= 2009 Safeway Championship =

Manitoba men's provincial curling championship

- Host city: Selkirk, Manitoba
- Arena: Selkirk Recreation Centre
- Dates: February 18–22
- Winner: Team Stoughton
- Curling club: Charleswood CC, Winnipeg
- Skip: Jeff Stoughton
- Third: Kevin Park
- Second: Rob Fowler
- Lead: Steve Gould
- Finalist: Kerry Burtnyk

The 2009 Safeway Championship, Manitoba's provincial men's curling championship, was held February 18 to 22 at the Selkirk Recreation Centre in Selkirk, Manitoba. The winning Jeff Stoughton rink represented Manitoba at the 2009 Tim Hortons Brier in Calgary, Alberta where they lost in the final to Alberta.

== Teams ==
The teams are listed as follows:

Skip	Third	Second	Lead	Alternate	Club
Farrol Asham	Wayne McLellan	Glen Ringrose	Stewart Holditch	Gord Holditch	Burntwood CC, Thompson
Dave Boehmer	Matt Lacriox	Kyle Einerson	Marc Lacriox		Petersfield CC, Petersfield
David Bohn	Dennis Bohn	Andrew Melnuk	David Hamblin	A.J. Girardin	Assiniboine Memorial CC, Winnipeg
Kerry Burtnyk	Don Walchuk	Richard Daneault	Garth Smith	Ken Tresoor	Assiniboine Memorial CC, Winnipeg
Reid Carruthers	Dan Kammerlock	Derek Samagalski	Shane Kilgallen		West Kildonan CC, Winnipeg
Rob Cosens	Jim Ireland	Todd Russell	Mike Trager		West St. Paul CC, Winnipeg
Darryl Friesen	Ernie Funk	Jamie Wall	Reg Funk		St. Vital CC, Winnipeg
Chris Galbraith	Adam Norget	Andrew Irving	Geoff Lang		Rosser CC, Rosser
Ryan Hyde	Hartley Vanstone	Jared Munro	Ashley Linden		Portage CC, Portage la Prairie
Brad Hyrich	Blaine Gogal	Doug Salahub	Ken Tetreault		Flin Flon CC, Flin Flon
Allan Lyburn	Scott Ramsay	Mark Taylor	Cory Barkley		Brandon CC, Brandon
William Lyburn	Geordie Hargreaves	Keith Marshall	Mike Marshall		Brandon CC, Brandon
Scott Madams	Gary Shibata	Terry Dreger	Tyler Specula		Pembina CC, Winnipeg
Shawn Magnusson	Kevin Vigfusson	Cory Mamchuk	Darcy Jacobs	Aaron Magnusson	Riverton CC, Riverton
Mike McEwen	B.J. Neufeld	Matt Wozniak	Denni Neufeld		Assiniboine Memorial CC, Winnipeg
Terry McNamee	Steve Irwin	Travis Taylor	Travis Saban		Brandon CC, Brandon
Richard Muntain	Kelly Marnoch	Cale Dunbar	Chris Cameron	Evan Reynolds	Carberry CC, Carberry
Randy Neufeld	Cory Anderson	Birk Cramer	Scott Podolski	Jeff Warkentin	La Salle CC, La Salle
Peter Nicholls	Dean Dunstone	James Kirkness	Wayne Sigurdson		Deer Lodge CC, Winnipeg
Steve Pauls	Clarence Reimer	Kevin Friesen	Don McLean		Manitou CC, Manitou
Daley Peters	Jason Gunnlaugson	Justin Richter	Tyler Forrest		Beausejour CC, Beausejour
Doug Riach	Kevin Thompson	Brent Baschuk	Greg Klassen	Mike Friesen	West Kildonan CC, Winnipeg
Kelly Robertson	Doug Armour	Trent Olmstead	Ace Ross		Neepawa CC, Neepawa
Brent Scales	Gord Hardy	Howie Scales	Kelly Tibble	Todd Trevellyan	Swan River CC, Swan River
Bob Sigurdson	Darren Oryniak	Alan Purdy	Cory Wolchuk		Granite CC, Winnipeg
Kelly Skinner	Allan Lawn	Darcy Hayward	Trevor Taylor		Hamiota CC, Hamiota
Dave Smith	Ron Gauthier	Dave Sitarik	Grant Mistelbacher		St. Vital CC, Winnipeg
Jeff Stoughton	Kevin Park	Rob Fowler	Steve Gould		Charleswood CC, Winnipeg
Brendan Taylor	Kyle Werenich	Taren Gesell	Cory Naharnie		West Kildonan CC, Winnipeg
Murray Warren	Lorne Sambrook	Terry Warren	Reg Warren	Don Williams	Deloraine CC, Deloraine
Murray Woodward	Ray Kujanpaa	Sean Nedohin	Justin Panagapko	Blain Funk	Rorketon CC, Rorketon
Braden Zawada	Ian Fordyce	Ray Fillion	Stephen Dash	Blake Zawada	Springfield CC, Dugald

== Knockout Brackets ==
32 team double knockout with playoff round
Four teams qualify each from A Event and B Event

=== A Event ===
First Knockout	Qualifier 1
Murray Woodward	6
Bob Sigurdson	5
Murray Woodward	4
Jeff Stoughton	8
Jeff Stoughton	9
Shawn Magnusson	1
Jeff Stoughton	8
Dave Boehmer	4
Darryl Friesen	10
Allan Lyburn	1
Darryl Friesen	3
Dave Boehmer	8
Dave Boehmer	6
Ryan Hyde	5

First Knockout	Qualifier 2
Scott Madams	2
Brendan Taylor	8
Brendan Taylor	7
David Bohn	3
David Bohn	7
Steve Pauls	3
Brendan Taylor	7
Mike McEwen	6
Farrol Asham	2
Mike McEwen	7
Mike McEwen	8
Doug Riach	3
Kelly Skinner	3
Doug Riach	4

First Knockout	Qualifier 3
Brent Scales	8
Chris Galbraith	11
Chris Galbraith	4
Peter Nicholls	6
Peter Nicholls	8
Rob Cosens	5
Peter Nicholls	9
Reid Carruthers	3
Dave Smith	2
Reid Carruthers	8
Reid Carruthers	8
Randy Neufeld	7
Randy Neufeld	7
Braden Zawada	4

First Knockout	Qualifier 4
William Lyburn	5
Kelly Robertson	7
Kelly Robertson	4
Kerry Burtnyk	8
Kerry Burtnyk	9
Brad Hyrich	1
Kerry Burtnyk	7
Daley Peters	5
Richard Muntain	7
Terry McNamee	2
Richard Muntain	5
Daley Peters	7
Daley Peters	8
Murray Warren	1

=== B Event ===
Second Knockout	Qualifier 5
Darryl Friesen	2
Bob Sigurdson	9	Bob Sigurdson	8	Dave Boehmer	1
Shawn Magnusson	7	Bob Sigurdson	6	Bob Sigurdson	8
Allan Lyburn	5
Murray Woodward	6
Allan Lyburn	9	Allan Lyburn	9
Ryan Hyde	3

Second Knockout	Qualifier 6
Doug Riach	7
Scott Madams	10	Scott Madams	4	Mike McEwen	5
Steve Pauls	7	Doug Riach	1	Kelly Skinner	2
Kelly Skinner	9
David Bohn	4
Farrol Asham	2	Kelly Skinner	8
Kelly Skinner	10

Second Knockout	Qualifier 7
Randy Neufeld	8
Brent Scales	8	Brent Scales	2	Reid Carruthers	6
Rob Cosens	5	Randy Neufeld	9	Randy Neufeld	2
Chris Galbraith	6
Chris Galbraith	7
Dave Smith	3	Braden Zawada	5
Braden Zawada	10

Second Knockout	Qualifier 8
Richard Muntain	5
William Lyburn	15	William Lyburn	8	Daley Peters	6
Brad Hyrich	6	William Lyburn	9	William Lyburn	4
Kelly Robertson	5
Kelly Robertson	7
Terry McNamee	7	Terry McNamee	5
Murray Warren	4

== Knockout Results ==
All draw times are listed in Central Standard Time (UTC−06:00).

=== Draw 1 ===
Wednesday, February 18, 8:30 am

Team	1	2	3	4	5	6	7	8	9	10	11	Final
Murray Woodward	0	1	0	2	0	1	1	0	0	0	1	6
Bob Sigurdson	0	0	0	0	1	0	0	1	2	1	0	5

Team	1	2	3	4	5	6	7	8	9	10	Final
Jeff Stoughton	2	3	2	0	1	1	X	X	X	X	9
Shawn Magnusson	0	0	0	1	0	0	X	X	X	X	1

Team	1	2	3	4	5	6	7	8	9	10	Final
Darryl Friesen	1	3	0	4	2	X	X	X	X	X	10
Allan Lyburn	0	0	1	0	0	X	X	X	X	X	1

Team	1	2	3	4	5	6	7	8	9	10	Final
Dave Boehmer	0	1	1	1	0	0	0	3	0	0	6
Ryan Hyde	0	0	0	0	0	2	1	0	1	1	5

Team	1	2	3	4	5	6	7	8	9	10	Final
Scott Madams	0	1	0	0	1	0	0	X	X	X	2
Brendan Taylor	1	0	2	3	0	0	2	X	X	X	8

=== Draw 2 ===
Wednesday, February 18, 12:15 pm

Team	1	2	3	4	5	6	7	8	9	10	Final
David Bohn	1	0	1	0	0	3	1	0	1	X	7
Steve Pauls	0	0	0	1	0	0	0	2	0	X	3

Team	1	2	3	4	5	6	7	8	9	10	Final
Farrol Asham	0	0	0	1	0	0	0	1	0	X	2
Mike McEwen	0	0	1	0	2	0	1	0	3	X	7

Team	1	2	3	4	5	6	7	8	9	10	Final
Kelly Skinner	0	0	0	0	1	0	1	1	0	0	3
Doug Riach	0	0	3	0	0	0	0	0	0	1	4

Team	1	2	3	4	5	6	7	8	9	10	11	Final
Brent Scales	2	0	1	0	0	0	0	2	0	3	0	8
Chris Galbraith	0	1	0	1	1	1	0	0	4	0	3	11

Team	1	2	3	4	5	6	7	8	9	10	Final
Peter Nicholls	0	2	0	1	3	0	2	0	0	X	8
Rob Cosens	1	0	1	0	0	2	0	0	1	X	5

=== Draw 3 ===
Wednesday, February 18, 4:00 pm

Team	1	2	3	4	5	6	7	8	9	10	Final
Dave Smith	0	0	0	0	1	0	1	0	X	X	2
Reid Carruthers	3	0	0	1	0	1	0	3	X	X	8

Team	1	2	3	4	5	6	7	8	9	10	Final
Randy Neufeld	0	1	0	2	1	0	0	2	0	1	7
Braden Zawada	2	0	1	0	0	0	0	0	1	0	4

Team	1	2	3	4	5	6	7	8	9	10	Final
William Lyburn	0	0	2	0	0	1	0	2	0	0	5
Kelly Robertson	1	0	0	2	1	0	1	0	1	1	7

Team	1	2	3	4	5	6	7	8	9	10	Final
Kerry Burtnyk	0	4	2	0	2	1	X	X	X	X	9
Brad Hyrich	1	0	0	0	0	0	X	X	X	X	1

Team	1	2	3	4	5	6	7	8	9	10	Final
Richard Muntain	0	2	1	0	1	2	0	1	X	X	7
Terry McNamee	0	0	0	1	0	0	1	0	X	X	2

=== Draw 4 ===
Wednesday, February 18, 8:15 pm

Team	1	2	3	4	5	6	7	8	9	10	Final
Daley Peters	2	0	1	2	1	2	X	X	X	X	8
Murray Warren	0	1	0	0	0	0	X	X	X	X	1

Team	1	2	3	4	5	6	7	8	9	10	11	Final
Bob Sigurdson	1	0	0	2	0	3	0	1	0	0	2	9
Shawn Magnusson	0	0	2	0	1	0	2	0	1	1	0	7

Team	1	2	3	4	5	6	7	8	9	10	Final
Allan Lyburn	1	1	1	1	0	0	2	0	3	X	9
Ryan Hyde	0	0	0	0	0	1	0	2	0	X	3

Team	1	2	3	4	5	6	7	8	9	10	Final
Scott Madams	0	1	0	2	1	0	2	0	3	1	10
Steve Pauls	2	0	1	0	0	3	0	1	0	0	7

Team	1	2	3	4	5	6	7	8	9	10	Final
Farrol Asham	0	0	0	1	0	0	1	0	X	X	2
Kelly Skinner	1	0	0	0	3	1	0	5	X	X	10

=== Draw 5 ===
Thursday, February 19, 8:30 am

Team	1	2	3	4	5	6	7	8	9	10	Final
Mike McEwen	0	0	1	0	0	2	1	0	4	X	8
Doug Riach	0	1	0	0	1	0	0	1	0	X	3

Team	1	2	3	4	5	6	7	8	9	10	Final
Chris Galbraith	0	0	0	0	0	2	1	0	1	0	4
Peter Nicholls	0	0	0	2	1	0	0	2	0	1	6

Team	1	2	3	4	5	6	7	8	9	10	11	Final
Reid Carruthers	2	0	1	0	2	0	1	1	0	0	1	8
Randy Neufeld	0	3	0	1	0	1	0	0	1	1	0	7

Team	1	2	3	4	5	6	7	8	9	10	Final
Brent Scales	2	0	0	2	0	2	0	1	1	X	8
Rob Cosens	0	1	2	0	2	0	0	0	0	X	5

Team	1	2	3	4	5	6	7	8	9	10	Final
Dave Smith	0	1	0	0	0	2	0	X	X	X	3
Braden Zawada	3	0	1	1	1	0	4	X	X	X	10

=== Draw 6 ===
Thursday, February 19, 12:15 pm

Team	1	2	3	4	5	6	7	8	9	10	Final
Murray Woodward	0	1	0	1	0	0	1	1	0	0	4
Jeff Stoughton	3	0	0	0	3	0	0	0	1	1	8

Team	1	2	3	4	5	6	7	8	9	10	Final
Darryl Friesen	0	1	0	1	0	0	1	0	X	X	3
Dave Boehmer	1	0	2	0	4	0	0	1	X	X	8

Team	1	2	3	4	5	6	7	8	9	10	Final
Brendan Taylor	0	1	0	2	1	1	0	1	1	X	7
David Bohn	1	0	1	0	0	0	1	0	0	X	3

Team	1	2	3	4	5	6	7	8	9	10	Final
Kelly Robertson	0	1	0	1	0	1	0	1	0	X	4
Kerry Burtnyk	2	0	2	0	2	0	0	0	2	X	8

Team	1	2	3	4	5	6	7	8	9	10	Final
Richard Muntain	1	0	0	1	0	1	0	0	2	0	5
Daley Peters	0	2	1	0	2	0	0	1	0	1	7

=== Draw 7 ===
Thursday, February 19, 4:00 pm

Team	1	2	3	4	5	6	7	8	9	10	Final
William Lyburn	4	0	4	0	2	0	1	4	X	X	15
Brad Hyrich	0	1	0	4	0	1	0	0	X	X	6

Team	1	2	3	4	5	6	7	8	9	10	Final
Terry McNamee	2	0	2	1	0	1	0	1	0	X	7
Murray Warren	0	1	0	0	2	0	0	0	1	X	4

Team	1	2	3	4	5	6	7	8	9	10	Final
Scott Madams	2	0	0	1	0	1	0	0	0	X	4
Doug Riach	0	1	1	0	2	0	0	2	1	X	7

Team	1	2	3	4	5	6	7	8	9	10	Final
Brent Scales	1	0	1	0	0	X	X	X	X	X	2
Randy Neufeld	0	4	0	1	3	X	X	X	X	X	8

Team	1	2	3	4	5	6	7	8	9	10	Final
Braden Zawada	0	0	2	0	1	0	1	0	1	0	5
Chris Galbraith	0	1	0	2	0	2	0	1	0	1	7

=== Draw 8 ===
Thursday, February 19, 7:45 pm

Team	1	2	3	4	5	6	7	8	9	10	Final
Bob Sigurdson	3	2	0	3	0	X	X	X	X	X	8
Darryl Friesen	0	0	1	0	1	X	X	X	X	X	2

Team	1	2	3	4	5	6	7	8	9	10	Final
Allan Lyburn	1	0	2	0	0	3	0	1	0	2	9
Murray Woodward	0	2	0	0	2	0	1	0	1	0	6

Team	1	2	3	4	5	6	7	8	9	10	Final
Kelly Skinner	1	0	0	0	3	2	0	0	2	X	8
David Bohn	0	1	1	0	0	0	0	2	0	X	4

Team	1	2	3	4	5	6	7	8	9	10	Final
William Lyburn	2	0	1	1	2	0	0	2	0	X	8
Richard Muntain	0	1	0	0	0	2	0	0	2	X	5

Team	1	2	3	4	5	6	7	8	9	10	Final
Terry McNamee	0	1	1	0	1	0	0	0	2	0	5
Kelly Robertson	1	0	0	1	0	1	2	1	0	1	7

=== Draw 9 ===
Friday, February 20, 8:30 am

Team	1	2	3	4	5	6	7	8	9	10	Final
Jeff Stoughton	1	0	0	1	1	0	3	2	X	X	8
Dave Boehmer	0	1	2	0	0	1	0	0	X	X	4

Team	1	2	3	4	5	6	7	8	9	10	11	Final
Brendan Taylor	0	1	0	3	0	0	0	2	0	0	1	7
Mike McEwen	1	0	1	0	0	0	2	0	1	1	0	6

Team	1	2	3	4	5	6	7	8	9	10	Final
Peter Nicholls	3	0	2	1	0	3	X	X	X	X	9
Reid Carruthers	0	1	0	0	2	0	X	X	X	X	3

Team	1	2	3	4	5	6	7	8	9	10	Final
Kerry Burtnyk	0	3	0	1	0	2	0	0	0	1	7
Daley Peters	1	0	2	0	1	0	0	1	0	0	5

=== Draw 10 ===
Friday, February 20, 12:15 pm

Team	1	2	3	4	5	6	7	8	9	10	11	Final
Bob Sigurdson	0	1	1	0	0	2	0	0	1	0	1	6
Allan Lyburn	2	0	0	1	1	0	0	0	0	1	0	5

Team	1	2	3	4	5	6	7	8	9	10	Final
Doug Riach	0	0	1	0	X	X	X	X	X	X	1
Kelly Skinner	3	0	0	6	X	X	X	X	X	X	9

Team	1	2	3	4	5	6	7	8	9	10	Final
Randy Neufeld	0	3	0	2	0	0	0	0	3	1	9
Chris Galbraith	1	0	2	0	0	0	2	1	0	0	6

Team	1	2	3	4	5	6	7	8	9	10	Final
William Lyburn	0	0	0	3	0	1	0	2	0	3	9
Kelly Robertson	0	1	0	0	1	0	1	0	2	0	5

=== Draw 11 ===
Friday, February 20, 4:00 pm

Team	1	2	3	4	5	6	7	8	9	10	Final
Bob Sigurdson	2	0	4	1	1	X	X	X	X	X	8
Dave Boehmer	0	1	0	0	0	X	X	X	X	X	1

Team	1	2	3	4	5	6	7	8	9	10	Final
Kelly Skinner	0	0	1	1	0	0	0	0	0	X	2
Mike McEwen	0	3	0	0	0	0	0	2	0	X	5

Team	1	2	3	4	5	6	7	8	9	10	Final
Randy Neufeld	0	0	0	0	1	0	0	1	X	X	2
Reid Carruthers	0	0	0	4	0	0	2	0	X	X	6

Team	1	2	3	4	5	6	7	8	9	10	Final
William Lyburn	1	1	0	1	0	0	0	0	1	0	4
Daley Peters	0	0	1	0	1	1	1	1	0	1	6

== Playoff Brackets ==
8 team double knockout
Four teams qualify into Championship round

=== A event ===
First Knockout
Q1	Jeff Stoughton	9
Q6	Mike McEwen	7
Q2	Brendan Taylor	10
Q5	Bob Sigurdson	8

Qualifier 1
Q1	Jeff Stoughton	7
Q2	Brendan Taylor	3

First Knockout
Q3	Peter Nicholls	7
Q8	Daley Peters	3
Q4	Kerry Burtnyk	7
Q7	Reid Carruthers	8

Qualifier 2
Q3	Peter Nicholls	5
Q7	Reid Carruthers	8

=== B event ===
Second Knockout			Qualifier 3
			Q3	Peter Nicholls	3
Q6	Mike McEwen	7	Q6	Mike McEwen	6
Q5	Bob Sigurdson	4

Second Knockout			Qualifier 4
			Q2	Brendan Taylor	3
Q8	Daley Peters	7	Q4	Kerry Burtnyk	10
Q4	Kerry Burtnyk	9

== Playoff Results ==
=== Draw 12 ===
Friday, February 20, 7:45 pm

Team	1	2	3	4	5	6	7	8	9	10	Final
Jeff Stoughton	1	0	2	2	0	2	0	1	0	1	9
Mike McEwen	0	1	0	0	2	0	1	0	3	0	7

Team	1	2	3	4	5	6	7	8	9	10	Final
Brendan Taylor	0	0	0	3	0	2	0	4	0	1	10
Bob Sigurdson	0	0	0	0	3	0	3	0	2	0	8

Team	1	2	3	4	5	6	7	8	9	10	Final
Peter Nicholls	0	0	2	0	2	2	0	0	0	1	7
Daley Peters	1	1	0	1	0	0	0	0	0	0	3

Team	1	2	3	4	5	6	7	8	9	10	Final
Kerry Burtnyk	0	0	0	2	0	2	0	2	1	0	7
Reid Carruthers	1	2	1	0	1	0	2	0	0	1	8

=== Draw 13 ===
Saturday, February 21, 9:00 am

Team	1	2	3	4	5	6	7	8	9	10	Final
Jeff Stoughton	0	1	0	3	0	1	0	2	X	X	7
Brendan Taylor	0	0	2	0	1	0	0	0	X	X	3

Team	1	2	3	4	5	6	7	8	9	10	Final
Peter Nicholls	1	0	1	0	1	0	2	0	0	X	5
Reid Carruthers	0	3	0	1	0	1	0	2	1	X	8

Team	1	2	3	4	5	6	7	8	9	10	Final
Mike McEwen	0	0	2	0	0	4	0	0	1	X	7
Bob Sigurdson	0	1	0	0	2	0	1	0	0	X	4

Team	1	2	3	4	5	6	7	8	9	10	11	Final
Daley Peters	1	0	0	2	0	1	0	1	0	2	0	7
Kerry Burtnyk	0	3	0	0	2	0	1	0	1	0	2	9

=== Draw 14 ===
Saturday February 21, 2:00 pm

Team	1	2	3	4	5	6	7	8	9	10	Final
Mike McEwen	0	1	0	1	0	0	1	1	0	2	6
Peter Nicholls	0	0	0	0	2	0	0	0	1	0	3

Team	1	2	3	4	5	6	7	8	9	10	Final
Kerry Burtnyk	2	0	0	3	0	1	1	3	X	X	10
Brendan Taylor	0	1	0	0	2	0	0	0	X	X	3

== Championship Round ==
Page playoff system
1	Jeff Stoughton	5
2	Reid Carruthers	3
3	Mike McEwen	3
4	Kerry Burtnyk	5

Semifinal
2	Reid Carruthers	4
4	Kerry Burtnyk	11

Final
1	Jeff Stoughton	7
4	Kerry Burtnyk	6

=== 1 vs. 2 ===
Saturday, February 21, 7:00 pm

Team	1	2	3	4	5	6	7	8	9	10	Final
Jeff Stoughton	0	0	0	0	1	0	1	0	3	X	5
Reid Carruthers	0	0	0	0	0	1	0	2	0	X	3

=== 3 vs. 4 ===
Saturday, February 21, 7:00 pm

Team	1	2	3	4	5	6	7	8	9	10	Final
Mike McEwen	0	0	2	0	0	0	1	0	0	X	3
Kerry Burtnyk	0	1	0	0	2	0	0	2	0	X	5

=== Semifinal ===
Sunday, February 22, 9:30 am

Team	1	2	3	4	5	6	7	8	9	10	Final
Kerry Burtnyk	2	0	2	0	0	5	0	2	X	X	11
Reid Carruthers	0	1	0	1	1	0	1	0	X	X	4

=== Final ===
Sunday, February 22, 2:00 pm

Team	1	2	3	4	5	6	7	8	9	10	Final
Jeff Stoughton	2	1	0	1	0	1	0	1	0	1	7
Kerry Burtnyk	0	0	2	0	1	0	1	0	2	0	6

2009 Safeway Championship

Jeff Stoughton
7th Manitoba Provincial Championship title
