= 2015 Safeway Championship =

- Host city: Brandon, Manitoba
- Arena: Keystone Centre
- Dates: February 4–8
- Winner: Team Carruthers
- Curling club: West St. Paul CC, West St. Paul
- Skip: Reid Carruthers
- Third: Braeden Moskowy
- Second: Derek Samagalski
- Lead: Colin Hodgson
- Finalist: Mike McEwen

The 2015 Safeway Championship, Manitoba's provincial men's curling championship, was held from February 4 to 8 at the Keystone Centre in Brandon, Manitoba. The winning Reid Carruthers team represented Manitoba at the 2015 Tim Hortons Brier in Calgary.

This was the last time where Safeway was the title sponsor for the Manitoba men's provincial championships, which they sponsored since 1995.

== Teams ==
Teams are as follows:

Skip	Third	Second	Lead	Alternate	Club
Daniel Birchard	Kelly Fordyce	Brody Moore	Andrew Peck	Neil Okumura	Pembina
David Bohn	Bryan Galbraith	Dennis Bohn	Larry Solomon	Shawn Magnusson	Assiniboine Memorial
Grant Brown	Jonathan Sawatzky	Tuff Seguin	Mike McGurk		Burntwood
Braden Calvert	Kyle Kurz	Lucas Van Den Bosch	Brendan Wilson	Trevor Calvert	Deer Lodge
Reid Carruthers	Braeden Moskowy	Derek Samagalski	Colin Hodgson		West St. Paul
Jerry Chudley	Kevin Cooley	Brent McKee	Paul Robertson	Jason Vinnell	Neepawa
Perry Fisher	Kevin Cullen	Brett McGregor	Sean Martin	Brett Hargreaves	Wawanesa
Kyle Foster	Andrew Wickman	Ryan Hlatkey	Chad Barkman	Adam Wickman	Fort Rouge
Sean Grassie	Corey Chambers	Kody Janzen	Stuart Shiells		Deer Lodge
Jason Gunnlaugson	Colton Lott	Kyle Doering	Rob Gordon	Matt Dunstone	Granite
Ryan Hyde	Kyle Einerson	Farrol Asham	Kenny Keeler	Travis Taylor	Portage
Jared Kolomaya	Neil Kitching	Kennedy Bird	Daniel Hunt		Stonewall
Bill Kuran	Taylor McIntyre	Riley Smith	Jared Hancox		Granite
Trevor Loreth	Brad Haight	Ryan Lowdon	Brett Cawson	Gerry Haight	Granite
Mark Lukowich	Stuart Gresham	Chris Chimuk	Kevin Wiebe	Steen Sigurdson	Granite
William Lyburn	Richard Daneault	Andrew Irving	Dan Gagne		Granite
Kelly Marnoch	Bart Witherspoon	Branden Jorgensen	Chris Cameron	Steve Irwin	Carberry
Evan Martin	Travis Bale	Ian Fordyce	Nigel Milnes	Scott Madams	East St. Paul
Curtis McCannell	Rob Van Deynze	Bill Thiessen	Jason Morrow	Kyle McCannell	Pilot Mound
Mike McEwen	B. J. Neufeld	Matt Wozniak	Denni Neufeld		Fort Rouge
Greg Mikolayek	Ian Harkness	Dean Nero	Clint Fuz	Pat Carson	Fort Rouge
Richard Muntain	Mike McCaughan	Curtis Atkins	Rodney Legault	Rob Atkins	Pinawa
Roger Parker	Jason Yates	Ian Ferley	Robbie Fisher	Marc Meyers	Dauphin
Steve Pauls	Clarence Reimer	Kevin Friesen	Tim Bridges	Eric Atkins	Manitou
Daley Peters	Brendan Taylor	Taren Gesell	Greg Melnichuk		West Kildonan
Scott Ramsay	Mark Taylor	Ross McFadyen	Kyle Werenich	Kevin Thompson	Granite
Kelly Robertson	Doug Armour	Peter Prokopowich	Bob Scales	Mark Robertson	Neepawa
Merv Satterthwaite	Brent Griffin	Heinz Warkentin	Mike Zwarycz	Ken Armstrong	St. Vital
Andy Stewart	Andrew Hunt	Sam Good	Trevor Blue	Myles MacMillan	Stonewall
Jeff Stoughton	Rob Fowler	Alex Forrest	Connor Njegovan		Charleswood
Glenn Toews	Bryan Preston	Dwayne Moffatt	Steve Procyshyn		Dauphin
Murray Warren	Brian Barker	Terry Warren	Reg Warren	Gary Barker	Deloraine

== Knockout Brackets ==
32 team double knockout with playoff round
Four teams qualify each from A Event and B Event

=== A Event ===
First Knockout	Qualifier 1
Mark Lukowich	7
Bill Kuran	5
Mark Lukowich	1
Jeff Stoughton	7
Jeff Stoughton	13
Roger Parker	2
Jeff Stoughton	8
Daley Peters	4
Steve Pauls	6
Daley Peters	10
Daley Peters	8
Daniel Birchard	6
Jason Gunnlaugson	2
Daniel Birchard	9

First Knockout	Qualifier 2
Andy Stewart	6
Trevor Loreth	9
Trevor Loreth	7
Scott Ramsay	8
Scott Ramsay	9
Merv Satterhwaite	6
Scott Ramsay	7
Kelly Marnoch	10
Glenn Toews	4
Reid Carruthers	11
Reid Carruthers	4
Kelly Marnoch	6
Kelly Marnoch	8
Ryan Hyde	2

First Knockout	Qualifier 3
Jerry Chudley	8
Richard Muntain	11
Richard Muntain	9
William Lyburn	4
William Lyburn	12
Grant Brown	3
Richard Muntain	6
Braden Calvert	9
Perry Fisher	2
Sean Grassie	5
Sean Grassie	3
Braden Calvert	7
Braden Calvert	9
Evan Martin	5

First Knockout	Qualifier 4
Kyle Foster	3
Kelly Robertson	8
Kelly Robertson	3
Mike McEwen	7
Mike McEwen	10
Greg Mikolajek	1
Mike McEwen	8
Jared Kolomaya	1
Curtis McCannell	10
David Bohn	6
Curtis McCannell	5
Jared Kolomaya	9
Jared Kolomaya	7
Murray Warren	3

=== B Event ===
Second Knockout	Qualifier 5
Daniel Birchard	9
Bill Kuran	9	Bill Kuran	6	Daley Peters	3
Roger Parker	1	Daniel Birchard	2	Jason Gunnlaugson	8
Jason Gunnlaugson	8
Mark Lukowich	5
Steve Pauls	1	Jason Gunnlaugson	7
Jason Gunnlaugson	8

Second Knockout	Qualifier 6
Reid Carruthers	10
Andy Stewart	8	Andy Stewart	1	Scott Ramsay	4
Merv Satterhwaite	6	Reid Carruthers	8	Reid Carruthers	8
Trevor Loreth	2
Trevor Loreth	9
Glenn Toews	7	Ryan Hyde	2
Ryan Hyde	11

Second Knockout	Qualifier 7
Sean Grassie	9
Jerry Chudley	4	Grant Brown	4	Richard Muntain	6
Grant Brown	6	Sean Grassie	8	Evan Martin	8
Evan Martin	9
William Lyburn	6
Perry Fisher	2	Evan Martin	7
Evan Martin	8

Second Knockout	Qualifier 8
Curtis McCannell	3
Kyle Foster	10	Kyle Foster	6	Jared Kolomaya	9
Greg Mikolajek	3	Kyle Foster	10	Kyle Foster	3
Kelly Robertson	6
Kelly Robertson	10
David Bohn	8	David Bohn	2
Murray Warren	5

== Playoff Brackets ==
8 team double knockout
Four teams qualify into Championship Round

=== A event ===
First Knockout
Q1	Jeff Stoughton	3
Q6	Reid Carruthers	9
Q2	Kelly Marnoch	4
Q5	Jason Gunnlaugson	6

Qualifier 1
Q6	Reid Carruthers	7
Q5	Jason Gunnlaugson	3

First Knockout
Q3	Braden Calvert	5
Q8	Jared Kolomaya	6
Q4	Mike McEwen	7
Q7	Evan Martin	1

Qualifier 2
Q8	Jared Kolomaya	5
Q4	Mike McEwen	8

=== B event ===
Second Knockout			Qualifier 3
			Q8	Jared Kolomaya	4
Q1	Jeff Stoughton	9	Q1	Jeff Stoughton	10
Q2	Kelly Marnoch	3

Second Knockout			Qualifier 4
			Q5	Jason Gunnlaugson	6
Q3	Braden Calvert	6	Q3	Braden Calvert	8
Q7	Evan Martin	5

== Championship Round ==
Page playoff system
1	Reid Carruthers	6
2	Mike McEwen	5
3	Jeff Stoughton	6
4	Braden Calvert	4

Semifinal
2	Mike McEwen	6
3	Jeff Stoughton	4

Final
1	Reid Carruthers	5
2	Mike McEwen	3

=== 1 vs. 2 ===
Saturday, February 7, 7:00 pm

Sheet C	1	2	3	4	5	6	7	8	9	10	11	Final
Reid Carruthers	0	0	1	0	0	0	2	2	0	0	1	6
Mike McEwen	2	0	0	1	1	0	0	0	0	1	0	5

=== 3 vs. 4 ===
Saturday, February 7, 7:00 pm

Sheet D	1	2	3	4	5	6	7	8	9	10	Final
Jeff Stoughton	0	0	2	0	0	1	0	3	0	X	6
Braden Calvert	2	0	0	0	1	0	1	0	0	X	4

=== Semifinal ===
Sunday, February 8, 9:00 am

Sheet C	1	2	3	4	5	6	7	8	9	10	Final
Mike McEwen	0	0	0	3	0	0	0	2	1	X	6
Jeff Stoughton	0	0	2	0	1	1	0	0	0	X	4

=== Final ===
Sunday, February 8, 2:30 pm

Sheet C	1	2	3	4	5	6	7	8	9	10	Final
Reid Carruthers	0	0	0	1	0	3	0	0	1	X	5
Mike McEwen	0	1	0	0	0	0	1	1	0	X	3

2015 Safeway Championship

Reid Carruthers
4th Manitoba Provincial Championship title
