= 2012 Safeway Championship =

- Host city: Dauphin, Manitoba
- Arena: Credit Union Place
- Dates: February 8–12
- Winner: Team Fowler
- Curling club: Brandon CC, Brandon
- Skip: Rob Fowler
- Third: Allan Lyburn
- Second: Richard Daneault
- Lead: Derek Samagalski
- Finalist: Mike McEwen

The 2012 Safeway Championship, Manitoba's men's provincial curling championship, was held from February 8 to 12 at the Credit Union Place in Dauphin, Manitoba. The winning team of Rob Fowler, represented Manitoba at the 2012 Tim Hortons Brier in Saskatoon, Saskatchewan.

== Teams ==
Thirty-two teams qualify for the men's provincial championship in Manitoba. Berths 1–14 represent the rural zones, and berths 15–21 represent the Winnipeg zones. There were two separate bonspiels played earlier in the year, the Northern and Southern Bonspiels, representing the north and south; these represent berths 22 and 23. Berth 24 goes to the winner of the Brandon Bonspiel played around the same time of fall as the Northern and Southern floating bonspiels. Berth 25 goes to the prior year's Manitoban champion, assuming the team meets the requirements to represent themselves. The same goes for berths 26 and 27, which go to the Manitoba Curling Tour champion and the top Manitoban team on the Canadian Team Ranking System, respectively. Berth 27 must be declared by November 1, 2010. Numbers 28–32 are qualifiers from the MCA Bonspiel, also subject to subset rules and requirements.

Once all 32 teams have been qualified, they will be seeded respectively and slotted into the draw format of 1 vs 32, 2 vs 31, and so on.

Skip	Third	Second	Lead	Club(s)	Berth Number	Seed	Notes
Rae Hainstock	Gerry Haight	Alex Sutherland	Al Meston	Burntwood CC	1	28	Norman Zone winner 1
Brad Hyrich	Jason Levers	Lyle Kennedy	Terry Boydell	Flin Flon CC	2	32	Norman Zone winner 2
Glenn Toews	Nick Ogryzlo	Mike Schott	Ken Levandoski	Dauphin CC	3	31	Parkland Zone winner 1
Rae Kujanpaa	Ray Baker	Bob Alm	Bob Scales	Dauphin CC	4	23	Parkland Zone winner 2
Jared Kolomaya	Neil Kitching	Kennedy Bird	Daniel Hunt	Stonewall CC	5		Interlake Zone winner 1
Rob Atkins	Clarence Kohut	Graham Grimes	Curtis Atkins	East St.Paul CC	6	26	Interlake Zone winner 2
David Hamblin	Kevin Hamblin	Kyle Einarson	Mike Neufeld	Morris CC	7		Central Zone winner 1
Dean North	Darcy Hayward	Bill North Jr.	Warren McCutcheon	Carmen CC	8		Central Zone winner 2
Richard Muntain	Mike McCaughan	Justin Reischek	Keith Doherty	Pinawa	9		Eastman Zone winner 1
Murray Woodward	William Kuran	Nathan Bodnarchuk	Terry Dreger	Ste.Anne CC	10		Eastman Zone winner 2
Kelly Skinner	Allan Lawn	Greg Rabe	Mike Marshall	Brandon CC	11		Westman Zone winner 1
Terry McNamee	Steve Irwin	Geordie Hargreaves	Travis Saban	Brandon CC	12	9	Westman Zone winner 2
Kelly Robertson	Doug Armour	Duane Lang	Ace Ross	Neepawa CC	13		Westman Zone winner 3
Vic Peters (Fourth)	Daley Peters (Skip)	Brendan Taylor	Kyle Werenich	West Kildonan CC	14	5	Winnipeg Zone winner 1
Jim Coleman	A.J. Girardin	Brad Van Walleghem	Shane Halliburton	Pembina CC	15		Winnipeg Zone winner 2
Scott Ramsay	Mark Taylor	Ross McFadyen	Ken Buchanan	Granite CC	16		Winnipeg Zone winner 3
Jason Gunnlaugson	Justin Richter	Jason Ackerman	David Kraichy	Assiniboine Memorial CC	17	8	Winnipeg Zone winner 4
Dave Elias	Kevin Thompson	Hubert Perrin	Chris Suchy	West Kildonan CC	18	10	Winnipeg Zone winner 5 Additional berth based on regional participation
Kyle Foster	Wes Jonasson	Shawn Magnusson	Darcy Jacobs	Arborg CC	19		Safeway Berth Bonspiel
Rob Van Kommer	Bart Witherspoon	Cale Dunbar	Ian Scott	Carberry CC	20		Safeway Berth Bonspiel
Jerry Chudley	Kevin Cooley	Kyle Csversko	Paul Robertson	Neepawa CC	21	24	Brandon Men's Berth Bonspiel
Dean Dunstone	Ken Tresoor	Taren Gesell	Greg Melnichuk	Rossmere CC	22	7	Manitoba Curling Tour event winner
Rob Fowler	Allan Lyburn	Richard Daneault	Derek Samagalski	Brandon CC	23	3	MCT Champion
Mike McEwen	B.J. Neufeld	Matt Wozniak	Denni Neufeld	Assiniboine Memorial CC	24	2	Manitoba's top team from the Canadian; Team Ranking System
William Lyburn	James Kirkness	Alex Forrest	Tyler Forrest	Deer Lodge CC	25	4	2 Highest ranked MCT teams at conclusion of MCT championship
Sean Grassie	Corey Chambers	Kody Janzen	Stuart Shiells	Deer Lodge CC	26	6	2 Highest ranked MCT teams at conclusion of MCT championship
Jeff Stoughton	Jon Mead	Reid Carruthers	Steve Gould	Charleswood CC	27	1	Defending Champion
Curtis McCannell	Don Vines	Bill Harding	Jason Morrow	Pilot Mound CC	28	29	MCA Bonspiel Asham Event qualifier
Dave Johnson	Robin Nelson	Craig Scott	David Bay	Pembina CC	29	27	MCA Bonspiel Safeway-Lucerne Event qualifier
Bruce Jones	Dave Lemoine	Ash Toews	Hank Lemoine	St. Vital CC	30	30	MCA Bonspiel Safeway-Lucerne Event qualifier
Trevor Loreth	Brad Haight	Ryan Lowdon	Brett Cawson	West Kildonan CC	31		MCA Bonspiel Winnipeg Free Press Event qualifier
Carl German	Brian Cox	Daniel Cox	Wayne Sobering	West St. Paul CC	32	25	MCA Bonspiel Winnipeg Free Press Event qualifier

== Knockout Brackets ==
32 team double knockout with playoff round
Four teams qualify each from A Event and B Event

=== A Event ===
First Knockout	Qualifier 1
Rob Van Kommer	5
Kelly Skinner	7
Kelly Skinner	2
Mike McEwen	7
Mike McEwen	7
Glenn Toews	6
Mike McEwen	8
Dean Dunstone	4
Rob Atkins	2
Dean Dunstone	8
Dean Dunstone	7
Dave Elias	4
Dave Elias	10
Rae Kujanpaa	9

First Knockout	Qualifier 2
Kyle Foster	8
David Hamblin	3
Kyle Foster	3
Sean Grassie	7
Sean Grassie	9
Dave Johnson	2
Sean Grassie	6
Rob Fowler	9
Bruce Jones	3
Rob Fowler	5
Rob Fowler	8
Richard Muntain	4
Jared Kolomaya	4
Richard Muntain	10

First Knockout	Qualifier 3
Dean North	3
Kelly Robertson	10
Kelly Robertson	1
William Lyburn	6
William Lyburn	7
Curtis McCannell	3
William Lyburn	8
Daley Peters	11
Rae Hainstock	5
Daley Peters	7
Daley Peters	7
Scott Ramsay	4
Scott Ramsay	11
Jim Coleman	6

First Knockout	Qualifier 4
Trevor Loreth	4
Murray Woodward	9
Murray Woodward	1
Jeff Stoughton	7
Jeff Stoughton	11
Brad Hyrich	2
Jeff Stoughton	8
Jerry Chudley	3
Carl German	2
Jason Gunnlaugson	9
Jason Gunnlaugson	5
Jerry Chudley	8
Terry McNamee	6
Jerry Chudley	11

=== B Event ===
Second Knockout	Qualifier 5
Dave Elias	9
Rob Van Kommer	3	Glenn Toews	3	Dean Dunstone	4
Glenn Toews	8	Dave Elias	10	Dave Elias	9
Kelly Skinner	8
Kelly Skinner	9
Rob Atkins	8	Rob Atkins	6
Rae Kujanpaa	2

Second Knockout	Qualifier 6
Richard Muntain	10
David Hamblin	6	David Hamblin	3	Sean Grassie	8
Dave Johnson	4	Richard Muntain	4	Kyle Foster	4
Kyle Foster	8
Kyle Foster	8
Bruce Jones	2	Jared Kolomaya	4
Jared Kolomaya	9

Second Knockout	Qualifier 7
Scott Ramsay	9
Dean North	9	Dean North	5	William Lyburn	8
Curtis McCannell	7	Scott Ramsay	7	Scott Ramsay	4
Jim Coleman	5
Kelly Robertson	3
Rae Hainstock	6	Jim Coleman	8
Jim Coleman	8

Second Knockout	Qualifier 8
Jason Gunnlaugson	3
Trevor Loreth	7	Trevor Loreth	7	Jerry Chudley	2
Brad Hyrich	2	Trevor Loreth	2	Terry McNamee	11
Terry McNamee	8
Murray Woodward	4
Carl German	3	Terry McNamee	7
Terry McNamee	8

== Knockout Results ==
All draw times are listed in Central Standard Time (UTC−06:00).

=== Draw 1 ===
Wednesday, February 8, 8:30 am

Sheet A	1	2	3	4	5	6	7	8	9	10	Final
Rob Van Kommer	0	0	1	0	2	0	0	0	2	0	5
Kelly Skinner	1	1	0	2	0	0	1	1	0	1	7

Sheet B	1	2	3	4	5	6	7	8	9	10	Final
Mike McEwen	0	2	1	1	0	1	0	1	0	1	7
Glenn Toews	1	0	0	0	3	0	1	0	1	0	6

Sheet C	1	2	3	4	5	6	7	8	9	10	Final
Rob Atkins	1	0	0	1	0	0	0	0	X	X	2
Dean Dunstone	0	2	0	0	2	1	2	1	X	X	8

Sheet D	1	2	3	4	5	6	7	8	9	10	11	Final
Dave Elias	0	2	1	0	0	2	2	1	0	1	1	10
Rae Kujanpaa	2	0	0	4	1	0	0	0	2	0	0	9

Sheet E	1	2	3	4	5	6	7	8	9	10	Final
Kyle Foster	0	2	1	0	1	1	2	1	X	X	8
David Hamblin	1	0	0	2	0	0	0	0	X	X	3

=== Draw 2 ===
Wednesday, February 8, 12:15 pm

Sheet A	1	2	3	4	5	6	7	8	9	10	Final
Sean Grassie	0	3	1	1	0	4	X	X	X	X	9
Dave Johnson	1	0	0	0	1	0	X	X	X	X	2

Sheet B	1	2	3	4	5	6	7	8	9	10	Final
Bruce Jones	0	0	1	1	0	0	1	0	0	X	3
Rob Fowler	0	0	0	0	3	1	0	1	0	X	5

Sheet C	1	2	3	4	5	6	7	8	9	10	Final
Jared Kolomaya	1	0	1	0	0	0	2	0	X	X	4
Richard Muntain	0	2	0	4	2	1	0	1	X	X	10

Sheet D	1	2	3	4	5	6	7	8	9	10	Final
Dean North	0	0	2	0	1	0	0	X	X	X	3
Kelly Robertson	1	0	0	3	0	2	4	X	X	X	10

Sheet E	1	2	3	4	5	6	7	8	9	10	Final
William Lyburn	2	0	0	0	2	0	3	0	X	X	7
Curtis McCannell	0	0	0	1	0	1	0	1	X	X	3

=== Draw 3 ===
Wednesday, February 8, 4:00 pm

Sheet A	1	2	3	4	5	6	7	8	9	10	Final
Rae Hainstock	0	3	0	0	0	0	2	0	0	X	5
Daley Peters	1	0	3	1	1	1	0	0	0	X	7

Sheet B	1	2	3	4	5	6	7	8	9	10	Final
Scott Ramsay	0	0	4	0	2	0	3	0	2	X	11
Jim Coleman	0	2	0	1	0	2	0	1	0	0	6

Sheet C	1	2	3	4	5	6	7	8	9	10	Final
Trevor Loreth	0	1	0	0	3	0	0	0	0	X	4
Murray Woodward	0	0	0	0	0	1	5	1	2	X	9

Sheet D	1	2	3	4	5	6	7	8	9	10	Final
Jeff Stoughton	4	0	0	4	3	0	0	X	X	X	11
Brad Hyrich	0	1	0	0	0	0	1	X	X	X	2

Sheet E	1	2	3	4	5	6	7	8	9	10	Final
Carl German	0	1	0	0	1	0	0	X	X	X	2
Jason Gunnlaugson	2	0	1	2	0	2	2	X	X	X	9

=== Draw 4 ===
Wednesday, February 8, 8:15 pm

Sheet A	1	2	3	4	5	6	7	8	9	10	Final
Terry McNamee	0	1	0	1	0	3	0	0	1	0	6
Jerry Chudley	1	0	3	0	1	0	2	1	0	3	11

Sheet B	1	2	3	4	5	6	7	8	9	10	Final
Rob Van Kommer	0	1	1	0	0	0	1	X	X	X	3
Glenn Toews	2	0	0	1	4	1	0	X	X	X	8

Sheet C	1	2	3	4	5	6	7	8	9	10	Final
Rob Atkins	0	0	1	1	0	4	2	X	X	X	8
Rae Kujanpaa	0	0	0	0	2	0	0	X	X	X	2

Sheet D	1	2	3	4	5	6	7	8	9	10	Final
David Hamblin	3	0	1	1	0	0	0	1	0	X	6
Dave Johnson	0	2	0	0	1	0	0	0	1	X	4

Sheet E	1	2	3	4	5	6	7	8	9	10	Final
Bruce Jones	0	0	1	0	0	1	0	X	X	X	2
Jared Kolomaya	2	0	0	0	1	0	6	X	X	X	9

=== Draw 5 ===
Thursday, February 9, 8:30 am

Sheet A	1	2	3	4	5	6	7	8	9	10	Final
Rob Fowler	0	2	0	2	1	2	0	0	1	X	8
Richard Muntain	1	0	1	0	0	0	2	0	0	X	4

Sheet B	1	2	3	4	5	6	7	8	9	10	Final
Kelly Robertson	0	0	0	0	0	0	1	X	X	X	1
William Lyburn	0	2	2	2	0	0	0	X	X	X	6

Sheet C	1	2	3	4	5	6	7	8	9	10	Final
Daley Peters	0	1	0	0	3	0	0	3	0	X	7
Scott Ramsay	1	0	0	1	0	0	1	0	1	X	4

Sheet D	1	2	3	4	5	6	7	8	9	10	Final
Dean North	2	0	0	3	0	2	0	1	0	1	9
Curtis McCannell	0	0	2	0	2	0	2	0	1	0	7

Sheet E	1	2	3	4	5	6	7	8	9	10	Final
Rae Hainstock	0	1	0	2	0	1	0	0	2	0	6
Jim Coleman	1	0	2	0	2	0	0	2	0	1	8

=== Draw 6 ===
Thursday, February 9, 12:15 pm

Sheet A	1	2	3	4	5	6	7	8	9	10	Final
Kelly Skinner	1	0	0	0	1	X	X	X	X	X	2
Mike McEwen	0	2	1	4	0	X	X	X	X	X	7

Sheet B	1	2	3	4	5	6	7	8	9	10	Final
Dean Dunstone	1	0	0	2	1	2	0	0	1	X	7
Dave Elias	0	3	1	0	0	0	0	0	0	X	4

Sheet C	1	2	3	4	5	6	7	8	9	10	Final
Kyle Foster	0	1	0	1	0	0	0	1	X	X	3
Sean Grassie	2	0	2	0	0	1	2	0	X	X	7

Sheet D	1	2	3	4	5	6	7	8	9	10	Final
Murray Woodward	0	0	0	0	1	0	X	X	X	X	1
Jeff Stoughton	1	1	1	2	0	2	X	X	X	X	7

Sheet E	1	2	3	4	5	6	7	8	9	10	Final
Jason Gunnlaugson	1	0	0	0	1	0	1	2	0	X	5
Jerry Chudley	0	1	2	3	0	1	0	0	1	X	8

=== Draw 7 ===
Thursday, February 9, 4:00 pm

Sheet A	1	2	3	4	5	6	7	8	9	10	Final
Trevor Loreth	1	0	0	0	6	0	X	X	X	X	7
Brad Hyrich	0	1	0	0	0	1	X	X	X	X	2

Sheet B	1	2	3	4	5	6	7	8	9	10	Final
Carl German	0	0	1	0	1	0	0	1	0	X	3
Terry McNamee	1	1	0	1	0	2	1	0	2	X	8

Sheet C	1	2	3	4	5	6	7	8	9	10	Final
Richard Muntain	1	0	2	0	2	0	4	1	X	X	10
David Hamblin	0	1	0	3	0	1	0	0	X	X	5

Sheet D	1	2	3	4	5	6	7	8	9	10	Final
Scott Ramsay	0	2	0	0	3	3	0	1	X	X	9
Dean North	2	0	2	0	0	0	1	0	X	X	5

Sheet E	1	2	3	4	5	6	7	8	9	10	Final
Kelly Robertson	1	0	0	1	0	0	1	0	X	X	3
Jim Coleman	0	1	0	0	3	2	0	2	X	X	8

=== Draw 8 ===
Thursday, February 9, 7:45 pm

Sheet A	1	2	3	4	5	6	7	8	9	10	Final
Dave Elias	1	2	0	0	2	0	4	X	X	X	9
Glenn Toews	0	0	2	0	0	1	0	X	X	X	3

Sheet B	1	2	3	4	5	6	7	8	9	10	Final
Kelly Skinner	0	0	3	2	0	2	0	2	0	X	9
Rob Atkins	2	1	0	0	1	0	1	0	1	X	6

Sheet C	1	2	3	4	5	6	7	8	9	10	Final
Kyle Foster	0	3	1	0	1	0	0	2	1	X	8
Jared Kolomaya	1	0	0	1	0	2	0	0	0	X	4

Sheet D	1	2	3	4	5	6	7	8	9	10	Final
Jason Gunnlaugson	0	0	0	1	0	1	0	1	X	X	3
Trevor Loreth	2	2	2	0	0	0	1	0	X	X	7

Sheet E	1	2	3	4	5	6	7	8	9	10	Final
Murray Woodward	0	0	2	0	0	1	1	0	0	X	4
Terry McNamee	0	1	0	3	0	0	0	2	1	X	7

=== Draw 9 ===
Friday, February 10, 8:30 am

Team	1	2	3	4	5	6	7	8	9	10	Final
Mike McEwen	0	2	0	2	0	0	0	3	1	X	8
Dean Dunstone	1	0	2	0	0	0	1	0	0	X	4

Team	1	2	3	4	5	6	7	8	9	10	Final
Sean Grassie	2	0	0	1	0	2	0	1	0	X	6
Rob Fowler	0	1	0	0	3	0	3	0	2	X	9

Team	1	2	3	4	5	6	7	8	9	10	Final
William Lyburn	0	1	0	2	1	1	1	0	2	0	8
Daley Peters	3	0	4	0	0	0	0	2	0	2	11

Team	1	2	3	4	5	6	7	8	9	10	Final
Jeff Stoughton	0	1	0	2	1	0	3	0	1	X	8
Jerry Chudley	0	0	2	0	0	1	0	0	0	X	3

=== Draw 10 ===
Friday, February 10, 12:15 pm

Team	1	2	3	4	5	6	7	8	9	10	Final
Dave Elias	0	1	0	4	0	2	0	1	2	0	10
Kelly Skinner	2	0	3	0	1	0	1	0	0	1	8

Team	1	2	3	4	5	6	7	8	9	10	Final
Richard Muntain	0	0	1	1	0	0	0	2	0	X	4
Kyle Foster	0	1	0	0	1	4	1	0	1	X	8

Team	1	2	3	4	5	6	7	8	9	10	Final
Scott Ramsay	1	2	0	2	0	0	2	0	0	X	7
Jim Coleman	0	0	1	0	1	1	0	0	2	X	5

Team	1	2	3	4	5	6	7	8	9	10	Final
Trevor Loreth	0	0	1	0	0	1	0	X	X	X	2
Terry McNamee	0	1	0	3	2	0	2	X	X	X	8

=== Draw 11 ===
Friday, February 10, 4:00 pm

Team	1	2	3	4	5	6	7	8	9	10	Final
Dave Elias	1	0	0	3	0	1	0	3	1	X	9
Dean Dunstone	0	1	1	0	1	0	1	0	0	X	4

Team	1	2	3	4	5	6	7	8	9	10	Final
Kyle Foster	0	1	0	2	0	0	1	0	0	X	4
Sean Grassie	1	0	2	0	1	2	0	1	1	X	8

Team	1	2	3	4	5	6	7	8	9	10	Final
Scott Ramsay	0	1	0	0	1	0	2	0	0	0	4
William Lyburn	0	0	1	1	0	1	0	2	1	2	8

Team	1	2	3	4	5	6	7	8	9	10	Final
Terry McNamee	2	0	2	1	2	0	4	X	X	X	11
Jerry Chudley	0	1	0	0	0	1	0	X	X	X	2

== Playoff Brackets ==
8 team double knockout
Four teams qualify into Championship Round

=== A event ===
First Knockout
Q1	Mike McEwen	10
Q6	Sean Grassie	4
Q2	Rob Fowler	7
Q5	Dave Elias	8

Qualifier 1
Q1	Mike McEwen	8
Q5	Dave Elias	4

First Knockout
Q3	Daley Peters	5
Q8	Terry McNamee	12
Q4	Jeff Stoughton	5
Q7	William Lyburn	8

Qualifier 2
Q8	Terry McNamee	3
Q7	William Lyburn	6

=== B event ===
Second Knockout			Qualifier 3
			Q8	Terry McNamee	5
Q6	Sean Grassie	5	Q2	Rob Fowler	6
Q2	Rob Fowler	7

Second Knockout			Qualifier 4
			Q5	Dave Elias	7
Q3	Daley Peters	5	Q4	Jeff Stoughton	9
Q4	Jeff Stoughton	7

== Playoff Results ==
=== Draw 12 ===
Friday, February 10, 7:45 pm

Team	1	2	3	4	5	6	7	8	9	10	Final
Mike McEwen	0	2	0	2	0	0	3	0	3	X	10
Sean Grassie	1	0	1	0	0	1	0	1	0	X	4

Team	1	2	3	4	5	6	7	8	9	10	Final
Rob Fowler	1	0	1	0	2	0	1	0	2	0	7
Dave Elias	0	2	0	1	0	2	0	1	0	2	8

Team	1	2	3	4	5	6	7	8	9	10	Final
Daley Peters	1	0	1	0	3	0	0	0	X	X	5
Terry McNamee	0	2	0	2	0	3	2	3	X	X	12

Team	1	2	3	4	5	6	7	8	9	10	Final
Jeff Stoughton	2	0	0	0	1	0	1	0	1	X	5
William Lyburn	0	1	2	1	0	3	0	1	0	X	8

=== Draw 13 ===
Saturday, February 11, 9:00 am

Team	1	2	3	4	5	6	7	8	9	10	Final
Mike McEwen	0	1	1	0	0	1	2	0	3	X	8
Dave Elias	1	0	0	1	1	0	0	1	0	X	4

Team	1	2	3	4	5	6	7	8	9	10	Final
Terry McNamee	0	0	0	1	0	0	0	2	0	0	3
William Lyburn	0	1	1	0	0	2	1	0	1	2	8

Team	1	2	3	4	5	6	7	8	9	10	Final
Sean Grassie	1	1	1	0	1	0	1	0	0	0	5
Rob Fowler	0	0	0	1	0	3	0	1	1	1	7

Team	1	2	3	4	5	6	7	8	9	10	Final
Daley Peters	0	1	0	0	0	0	2	0	2	X	5
Jeff Stoughton	1	0	2	1	0	1	0	2	0	X	7

=== Draw 14 ===
Saturday, February 11, 2:00 pm

Team	1	2	3	4	5	6	7	8	9	10	Final
Rob Fowler	1	0	2	0	0	0	1	1	0	1	6
Terry McNamee	0	2	0	1	0	1	0	0	1	0	5

Team	1	2	3	4	5	6	7	8	9	10	Final
Jeff Stoughton	2	0	2	0	0	1	0	1	0	3	9
Dave Elias	0	1	0	2	1	0	1	0	2	0	7

== Championship Round ==
Page playoff system
1	Mike McEwen	7
2	William Lyburn	5
3	Rob Fowler	8
4	Jeff Stoughton	7

Semifinal
2	William Lyburn	5
3	Rob Fowler	6

Final
1	Mike McEwen	6
3	Rob Fowler	10

=== 1 vs. 2 ===
Saturday, February 11, 6:30 pm

Team	1	2	3	4	5	6	7	8	9	10	Final
Mike McEwen	0	2	1	0	2	0	0	1	0	1	7
William Lyburn	0	0	0	3	0	1	0	0	1	0	5

=== 3 vs. 4 ===
Saturday, February 11, 6:30 pm

Team	1	2	3	4	5	6	7	8	9	10	Final
Rob Fowler	1	0	2	0	0	1	0	3	0	1	8
Jeff Stoughton	0	3	0	0	1	0	1	0	2	0	7

=== Semifinal ===
Sunday, February 12, 9:00 am

Team	1	2	3	4	5	6	7	8	9	10	Final
William Lyburn	0	1	0	0	2	0	0	1	0	1	5
Rob Fowler	1	0	0	2	0	1	1	0	1	0	6

=== Final ===
Sunday, February 12, 1:30 pm

Team	1	2	3	4	5	6	7	8	9	10	Final
Mike McEwen	2	0	0	0	2	0	0	2	0	0	6
Rob Fowler	0	1	1	2	0	0	2	0	2	2	10

2012 Safeway Championship

Rob Fowler
1st Manitoba Provincial Championship title
