= B. J. Neufeld =

Canadian curler (born 1986)

- Curler
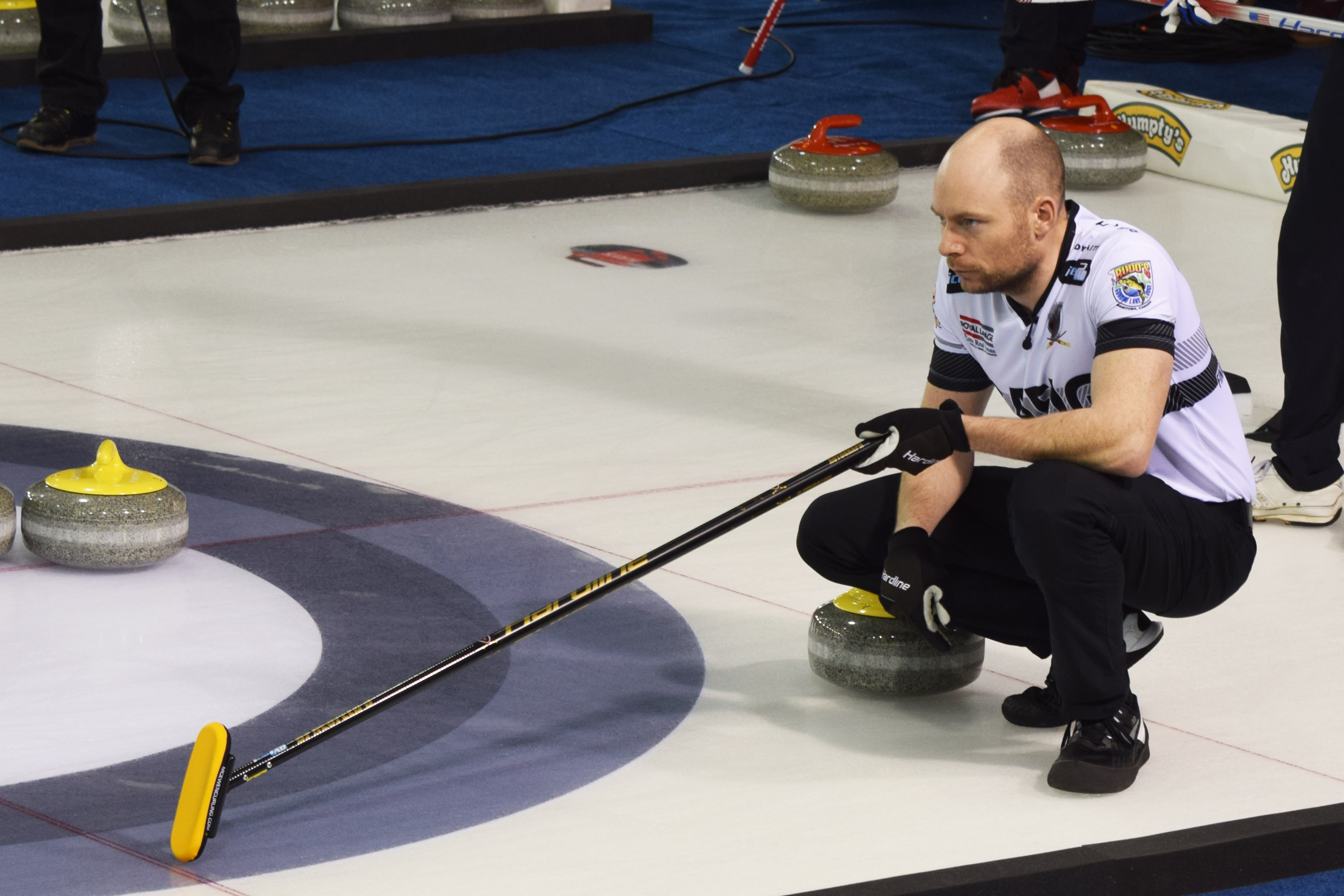
- Neufeld at the 2018 Elite 10
- Born: Brendan Neufeld; February 28, 1986 (age 40); Winnipeg, Manitoba, Canada

Team
- Curling club: Fort Rouge CC, Winnipeg, MB
- Skip: John Epping
- Third: B. J. Neufeld
- Second: Ryan Wiebe
- Lead: Ian McMillan

Curling career
- Member Association: Manitoba (2007-2018; 2022–present); Alberta (2018-2022)
- Brier: 10 (2016, 2017, 2018, 2019, 2020, 2021, 2022, 2023, 2024, 2025)
- World Championship: 1 (2019)
- Top CTRS ranking: 1st (2014–15)
- Grand Slam victories: 7 (2010 Masters, 2011 Canadian Open (Jan.), 2011 Canadian Open (Dec.), 2014 National (Nov.), 2015 Elite 10, 2015 Masters, 2018 Elite 10 (Mar.))
Medal record
Men's curling
Representing Canada
World Championships
Silver medal – second place	2019 Lethbridge
Representing Manitoba
Canadian Olympic Trials
Silver medal – second place	2017 Ottawa
The Brier
Silver medal – second place	2023 London
Bronze medal – third place	2017 St. John's
Representing Alberta
Canadian Olympic Trials
Bronze medal – third place	2021 Saskatoon
The Brier
Gold medal – first place	2019 Brandon
Silver medal – second place	2022 Lethbridge
Representing (Alberta) Wild Card
The Brier
Silver medal – second place	2021 Calgary

Brendan "B. J." Neufeld (born February 28, 1986) is a Canadian curler. He currently plays third on Team John Epping. He started curling around the age of ten and, like older brother Denni Neufeld, cites the achievements of his father as leading his interest into the game of curling. His father is Chris Neufeld who was a three-time Manitoba curling champion and one time Labatt Brier champion in 1992 as part of the Vic Peters team.

Neufeld previously coached the Briane Meilleur rink.

== Career ==
=== Juniors ===
As a junior curler, Neufeld was a three-time provincial junior champion of Manitoba in 2004, 2005, and 2007. He finished as a national junior semi-finalist at the 2004 Canadian Junior Curling Championships.

=== 2007–2010 ===
Neufeld joined the team of Mike McEwen and Matt Wozniak in 2007 with his brother Denni. In their first season together, they were a semi-finalist at the 2008 Safeway Championship, Manitoba's provincial championship. Their first Grand Slam event as a team was at the end season, at the 2008 Players' Championships. The team won two games, before being eliminated.

At the conclusion of the 2008–09 season the McEwen team was ranked 7th on the CCA rankings. They had made it to three Grand Slam playoffs, and finished 4th at the 2009 Safeway Championship.

During the 'Road to the Roar' 2009 Olympic Qualifier, the McEwen team just lost out to fellow Manitobans the Jason Gunnlaugson team in the semi-finals. Neufeld thus missed out on the 2009 Canadian Olympic Curling Trials final despite being the favourite in that particular matchup vs Gunnlaugson.

Neufeld made it to his first provincial final in 2010, when he lost to Jeff Stoughton in the 2010 Manitoba provincial final. The game was being played in Steinbach, Manitoba and as the Neufeld brothers and their father have roots in Steinbach, they were treated very much as the home team and crowd favourites.

=== 2010–2015: Grand Slam success and perennial provincial runner-up ===
The McEwen rink started the 2010–11 season off well by defeating provincial rival Jeff Stoughton to win the World Cup of Curling and his first ever Grand Slam title in November, 2010. In part of the teams runner-up result in the provincial finals of 2010 and in part because of his 4 victories and leading the overall money winnings in the World Curling Tour season as of November 2010, the McEwen team was named as a nominee for the provincial team of the year by the Manitoba Sportswriters and Sportscasters Association.

The team continued their strong season that year by defeating provincial rival Stoughton in the semi-final of the 2011 Canadian Open. They would then go on to beat the Glenn Howard team in the extra end of the final, thus winning their second career Grand Slam and their second of that season.

Neufeld's rink once again made it to the Manitoba provincial this time, being the top seed (also ranked 1st in Canada). However, once again lost to Stoughton in the final of the 2011 Safeway Championship, losing by one point in the final end. The McEwen team then lost their third straight provincial final game at the 2012 Safeway Championship, this time losing to Rob Fowler, thus tying a provincial record for consecutive final losses previous set by Kerry Burtnyk from 97 to 99. This dubious record was avoided in 2013, when the McEwen rink failed to reach the final, but again losing to the rival Stoughton rink in the 2013 Safeway Championship semi-final. Once again, at the 2014 Safeway Championship, the team lost the final to Stoughton.

Despite being ranked first in the world on both the World Curling Tour Order of Merit rankings and on the WCT money list, McEwen lost his fifth provincial final in six years in 2015, losing to Reid Carruthers.

=== Three Briers and team breakup ===
The McEwen rink would win their first provincial title in 2016, sending them to their first Brier. The team had already booked their place to the 2016 Tim Hortons Brier as their opponents, the Matt Dunstone rink had committed themselves to the 2016 World Junior Curling Championships which occurred at the same time as the Brier. When the Dunstone rink beat Reid Carruthers in the semi-final this meant that McEwen's team would go to the Brier, even if they had lost to Dunstone.

In 2017 the McEwen rink would defend their Manitoba Championship Title by beating Reid Carruthers in the final. He would then better his 2016 Brier showing, going 9–2 in the round robin to enter the playoffs in 1st place and with hammer and choice of rocks (Brad Gushue would also be 9-2 but would lose 1st place due to losing his round robin meeting). They would fall 7–5 to Brad Gushue in the 1–2 game however. In the semi-finals against reigning Brier and World Champion Kevin Koe, Manitoba was in control almost the whole way but up 5–3 with hammer in the 8th end Koe would make an incredible comeback with a steal in the 8th, a two in the 10th, and another steal in the extra end, dropping Manitoba to the bronze medal game. They would recover from this disappointment to win his first Brier medal, defeating Brad Jacobs in their rematch of the 2016 bronze medal game, 7–6 in an extra end.

While competing at the 2018 Viterra Championship, McEwen came down with chickenpox and was unable to play after the first game. Neufeld skipped the team, until a surprise appearance by McEwen in the final where they would lose to Carruthers. Despite the setback, his rink still had a chance to qualify for the 2018 Tim Hortons Brier through the wildcard game, which he won over Jason Gunnlaugson. The team had a difficult Brier and alongside Carruthers was unable to qualify for the playoffs. Following the disappointment at the Brier the McEwen team announced they would be breaking up at the end of the 2017–18 season. Just days after the announcement the McEwen team won the 2018 Elite 10 Grand Slam of Curling event, winning the top $28,000 prize money, and was the first team to go through the entire event undefeated. The Grand Slam victory was the team's seventh overall.

=== Joining Koe (2018–2022) ===
Neufeld joined the new Calgary-based team of Kevin Koe, Colton Flasch and Ben Hebert the following season. His new team began the 2018–19 season by winning the first leg of the Curling World Cup, defeating Norway's Steffen Walstad in the final. They also reached the final of the Canad Inns Men's Classic, but were beaten by the Bottcher rink. They also lost in the final of the 2018 Canada Cup to the Brad Jacobs rink 5–4. They had previously gone 4–2 in the round robin and won both the tiebreaker and semifinal games. In February, Team Koe finished runner-up to Team Bottcher at the 2019 TSN All-Star Curling Skins Game, earning $36,000 for their second-place finish. In provincial playdowns, the Koe rink lost two of their first three games at the 2019 Boston Pizza Cup, before winning five straight games to claim the Alberta provincial title. The team represented Alberta at the 2019 Tim Hortons Brier where they went undefeated throughout the entire tournament. After an 11–0 record through the round robin and championship pools, they beat Northern Ontario's Jacobs rink in the 1 vs. 2 game. They then faced the Bottcher rink in the final where, after a close game all the way through, Koe would execute a double takeout to score two in the tenth end and win the game 4–3 for the team. The win earned the team the right to represent Canada at the 2019 World Men's Curling Championship where they finished the round robin with a 9–3 record. They then won two playoff games to qualify for the final where they lost to Sweden's Niklas Edin rink 7–2, settling for silver. In Grand Slam play, the team failed to win any slams, but did make it to three finals at the 2018 Masters, the 2019 Players' Championship and the 2019 Champions Cup. They also reached the semifinals once and the quarterfinals in the three other events. Despite the lack of any event wins, their strong play was good enough to award them with the Pinty's Cup for the season's best Slam team. The team ended the season at the grand final of the Curling World Cup, where they beat the host Chinese team Zou Qiang in the final to secure another event title. Also during the 2018–19 season, the Koe rink along with five other teams represented North America at the 2019 Continental Cup where they lost by eight points.

Team Koe started their 2019–20 season at the 2019 AMJ Campbell Shorty Jenkins Classic and lost in the quarterfinal to Brad Jacobs. They lost the final of the Stu Sells Toronto Tankard to the Jacobs rink as well. In Grand Slam play, they made the semifinal of the 2019 Tour Challenge and the quarterfinals of the 2019 National. They then, however, missed the playoffs at both the 2019 Masters and the 2020 Canadian Open. At the 2019 Canada Cup, they finished the round robin with a 5–1 record, which qualified them directly for the final which they lost to the John Epping rink. To start 2020, Team Koe once again competed in the 2020 Continental Cup but were this time defeated by Team Europe by fifteen points. At the 2020 Tim Hortons Brier, representing Team Canada, they finished the championship pool with a 7–4 record, which was in a four-way tie for fourth. They faced Jacobs in the first round of tiebreakers where they lost 8–3 and were eliminated. It would be the team's last event of the season as both the Players' Championship and the Champions Cup Grand Slam events were cancelled due to the COVID-19 pandemic. On March 16, 2020, Team Koe announced they would be parting ways with second Colton Flasch. The following day, the team announced they would be adding John Morris to the team as their new second.

Team Koe began the 2020–21 season at the McKee Homes Fall Curling Classic where they lost in the quarterfinals. Their next three events included a semifinal finish at the Ashley HomeStore Curling Classic and two runner-up finishes at both the ATB Banff Classic and the ATB Okotoks Classic. Due to the COVID-19 pandemic in Alberta, the 2021 provincial championship was cancelled. As the reigning provincials champions, Team Brendan Bottcher was chosen to represent Alberta at the 2021 Tim Hortons Brier. However, due to many provinces cancelling their provincial championships due to the COVID-19 pandemic in Canada, Curling Canada added three Wild Card teams to the national championship, which were based on the CTRS standings from the 2019–20 season. Because Team Koe ranked 6th on the CTRS and kept at least three of their four players together for the 2020–21 season, they got the second Wild Card spot at the 2021 Brier in Calgary, Alberta. At the 2021 Tim Hortons Brier, the team finished with a 10–2 round robin record, in first place. This gave them a bye to the final, where they played Team Alberta, skipped by Brendan Bottcher in a re-match of the 2019 Brier final. This time Bottcher won, with the Koe rink taking home the silver medal. The team ended their season at the final two Slams of the season, the 2021 Champions Cup and the 2021 Players' Championship, reaching the semifinals of the Champions Cup.

The Koe rink won their first two events of the 2021–22 season, the ATB Okotoks Classic and the IG Wealth Management Western Showdown. At the first two Slams of the season, they reached the quarterfinals of the 2021 Masters and the semifinals of the 2021 National. They then competed in the 2021 Canadian Olympic Curling Trials, held November 20 to 28 in Saskatoon, Saskatchewan. Team Koe qualified for the Trials via their CTRS points as they finished in second place through the 2018–19 season. Through the round robin, Neufeld and teammates Kevin Koe, John Morris and Ben Hebert finished with a 6–2 record, only suffering losses to the Brad Gushue and Brad Jacobs rinks. This record earned them a place in the semifinal game where they faced the Jacobs' rink. Despite shooting a 96% game, the Koe rink lost the semifinal game 8–3 as Team Jacobs scored two four enders which ended the game early. In the new year, the team went undefeated to claim the 2022 Boston Pizza Cup. This earned them the right to represent Alberta at the 2022 Tim Hortons Brier where they finished with a 7–1 round robin record. They then won the seeding game against Saskatchewan's Colton Flasch and beat Team Canada's Brendan Bottcher in the 1 vs. 2 game to qualify directly for the final. There, they faced the Gushue rink. After a tight game all the way through, Team Gushue scored one in the extra end to win the game 9–8 and hand Team Koe their second consecutive Brier silver medal. They ended their season with two more playoff finishes at the 2022 Players' Championship and the 2022 Champions Cup, reaching the final of the latter.

=== Team Dunstone (2022–2024) ===
In March 2022, Team Koe announced that they would be disbanding. It was later announced that Neufeld would join the new Manitoba-based Matt Dunstone rink for the 2022–23 season. Dunstone would skip the team, with Neufeld playing third, Colton Lott at second and Ryan Harnden at lead.

With Team Dunstone, the rink were runners-up at the 2023 Tim Hortons Brier. Neufeld was dropped from the team in December 2024. as Colton Lott was moved up to his place and E. J. Harnden played second.

=== Team Carruthers (2025-2026) ===
In January 2025, he joined Team Carruthers as Third to play with Reid Carruthers, Catlin Schneider, and Connor Njegovan. He replaced Derek Samagalski. They played in the 2025 Brier as Team Manitoba.

=== Team Epping (2026-) ===
Following Carruthers's retirement, the team disbanded. He joined team John Epping for the 2026-27 curling season.

== Personal life ==
Neufeld was formerly employed as a PGA of Canada head golf professional at the Larters at St. Andrews Golf & Country Club. He is married to Sarah Neufeld and they have two daughters. He works as a real estate agent with Royal LePage Prime Real Estate - The Neufeld Group.

== Grand Slam record ==
Key
C	Champion
F	Lost in Final
SF	Lost in Semifinal
QF	Lost in Quarterfinals
R16	Lost in the round of 16
Q	Did not advance to playoffs
T2	Played in Tier 2 event
DNP	Did not participate in event
N/A	Not a Grand Slam event that season

Event	2005–06	2006–07	2007–08	2008–09	2009–10	2010–11	2011–12	2012–13	2013–14	2014–15	2015–16	2016–17	2017–18	2018–19	2019–20	2020–21	2021–22	2022–23	2023–24	2024–25	2025–26	2026–27
Invitational	N/A	N/A	N/A	N/A	N/A	N/A	N/A	N/A	N/A	N/A	SF	QF	DNP	QF	DNP	N/A	N/A	F	QF	SF	Q	QF
Masters	Q	DNP	DNP	Q	DNP	C	QF	QF	Q	F	C	QF	SF	F	Q	N/A	QF	Q	QF	DNP	T2	QF
National	DNP	DNP	DNP	QF	QF	QF	Q	F	QF	C	Q	Q	SF	SF	QF	N/A	SF	SF	Q	Q	DNP	Q
Open	DNP	DNP	DNP	SF	QF	C	C	SF	Q	QF	Q	QF	QF	QF	Q	N/A	N/A	QF	QF	QF	T2	
Players'	DNP	DNP	Q	SF	Q	QF	SF	F	SF	F	SF	F	SF	F	N/A	Q	QF	QF	Q	DNP	DNP	
Champions Cup	N/A	N/A	N/A	N/A	N/A	N/A	N/A	N/A	N/A	N/A	SF	QF	QF	F	N/A	SF	F	SF	N/A	N/A	N/A	N/A
Elite 10	N/A	N/A	N/A	N/A	N/A	N/A	N/A	N/A	N/A	C	QF	DNP	C	QF	N/A	N/A	N/A	N/A	N/A	N/A	N/A	N/A

== Teams ==
Season	Skip	Third	Second	Lead	Alternate
2003–04	Daley Peters	Matthew Lacroix	B. J. Neufeld	Marc Lacroix	
2004–05	Daley Peters	B. J. Neufeld	Doug Hamlin	Marc Lacroix	
2006–07	Andrew Irving	B. J. Neufeld	Travis Taylor	Marc Lacroix	
2007–08	Mike McEwen	Matt Wozniak	B. J. Neufeld	Denni Neufeld	
2008–09	Mike McEwen	B. J. Neufeld	Matt Wozniak	Denni Neufeld	
2009–10	Mike McEwen	B. J. Neufeld	Matt Wozniak	Denni Neufeld	
2010–11	Mike McEwen	B. J. Neufeld	Matt Wozniak	Denni Neufeld	
2011–12	Mike McEwen	B. J. Neufeld	Matt Wozniak	Denni Neufeld	
2012–13	Mike McEwen	B. J. Neufeld	Matt Wozniak	Denni Neufeld	
2013–14	Mike McEwen	B. J. Neufeld	Matt Wozniak	Denni Neufeld	
2014–15	Mike McEwen	B. J. Neufeld	Matt Wozniak	Denni Neufeld	
2015–16	Mike McEwen	B. J. Neufeld	Matt Wozniak	Denni Neufeld	
2016–17	Mike McEwen	B. J. Neufeld	Matt Wozniak	Denni Neufeld	
2017–18	Mike McEwen	B. J. Neufeld	Matt Wozniak	Denni Neufeld	
2018–19	Kevin Koe	B. J. Neufeld	Colton Flasch	Ben Hebert	
2019–20	Kevin Koe	B. J. Neufeld	Colton Flasch	Ben Hebert	
2020–21	Kevin Koe	B. J. Neufeld	John Morris	Ben Hebert	
2021–22	Kevin Koe	B. J. Neufeld	John Morris	Ben Hebert	
2022–23	Matt Dunstone	B. J. Neufeld	Colton Lott	Ryan Harnden	
2023–24	Matt Dunstone	B. J. Neufeld	Colton Lott	Ryan Harnden	
2024–25 (Sept.–Oct.)	Matt Dunstone	B. J. Neufeld	Colton Lott	Ryan Harnden	
2024–25 (Jan.–Apr.)	Reid Carruthers	B. J. Neufeld	Catlin Schneider	Connor Njegovan	Kyle Doering
2025–26	Reid Carruthers	B. J. Neufeld	Catlin Schneider	Connor Njegovan	Kyle Doering
2026–27	John Epping	B. J. Neufeld	Ryan Wiebe	Ian McMillan	
