= 2014 Canadian Senior Curling Championships – Men's tournament =

2014 Canadian Senior Curling Championships Men's tournament
- Host city: Yellowknife, Northwest Territories
- Arena: Yellowknife Community Arena; Yellowknife Curling Centre
- Dates: March 22–29
- Winner: Nova Scotia
- Curling club: Mayflower CC, Halifax
- Skip: Alan O'Leary
- Third: Andy Dauphinee
- Second: Danny Christianson
- Lead: Harold McCarthy
- Finalist: Manitoba (Kelly Robertson)

The men's tournament of the 2014 Canadian Senior Curling Championships was held from March 22 to 29 at the Yellowknife Community Arena and the Yellowknife Curling Centre in Yellowknife, Northwest Territories.

== Qualifying round ==
Four associations did not automatically qualify to the championships, and participated in a qualifying round. Two qualification spots were awarded to the winners of the double knockout round, Yukon and Northern Ontario.

=== Teams ===
The teams are listed as follows:

Province	Skip	Third	Second	Lead	Locale
Newfoundland and Labrador	Lorne Henderson	Paul Harvey	Peter Hollett	Wayne Young	Re/Max Centre, St. John's
Northern Ontario	Robbie Gordon	Ron Henderson	Dion Dumontelle	Doug Hong	Sudbury Curling Club, Sudbury
Nunavut	Ed Sattelberger	Dennis Masson	Lloyd Kendell	Murray Ball	Iqaluit Curling Club, Iqaluit
Yukon	George Hilderman	Doug Gee	Doug Hamilton	Dale Enzenauer	Whitehorse Curling Club, Whitehorse

=== Knockout Brackets ===
Semifinals			Qualifier 1
1	Newfoundland and Labrador	7
4	Nunavut	6	1	Newfoundland and Labrador	7
2	Northern Ontario	8	3	Yukon	9
3	Yukon	9

Semifinals			Qualifier 2
			1	Newfoundland and Labrador	3
2	Northern Ontario	7	2	Northern Ontario	9
4	Nunavut	1

== Teams ==
The teams are listed as follows:

Province	Skip	Third	Second	Lead	Locale(s)
Alberta	Mark Johnson	Kurt Balderston	Rob Bucholz	Del Shaughnessy	Grande Prairie Curling Club, Grande Prairie
British Columbia	Wes Craig	Blair Cusack	Tony Anslow	Kevin Britt	Victoria Curling Club, Victoria
Manitoba	Kelly Robertson	Doug Armour	Peter Prokopowich	Bob Scales	Neepawa Curling Club, Neepawa
New Brunswick	Mark Armstrong	Terry Roach	Jean Guy Boudreau	Bill Gates	Riverside Country Club, Rothesay
Northern Ontario	Robbie Gordon	Ron Henderson	Dion Dumontelle	Doug Hong	Sudbury Curling Club, Sudbury
Northwest Territories	Glen Hudy	Brian Kelln	Ben McDonald	Richard Klarowich	Yellowknife Curling Club, Yellowknife
Nova Scotia	Alan O'Leary	Andy Dauphinee	Danny Christianson	Harold McCarthy	Mayflower Curling Club, Halifax
Ontario	Peter Mellor	Jeff Thomson	Rob Saunders	Steve Foster	Kitchener-Waterloo Granite Curling Club, Waterloo
Prince Edward Island	Ted MacFadyen	Lou Nowlan	Pat Aylward	Earle Proude	Silver Fox Curling & Yacht Club, Summerside
Quebec	Denis Laflamme	Michel Lachance	Gaby Lanoue	Normand Bouchard	Club de curling Sept-Îles, Sept-Îles
Saskatchewan	Darrell McKee	Mark Lane	Rick Picard	Brad Gee	Nutana Curling Club, Saskatoon
Yukon	George Hilderman	Doug Gee	Doug Hamilton	Dale Enzenauer	Whitehorse Curling Club, Whitehorse

== Round-robin standings ==
Final round-robin standings

Key
Teams to Playoffs
Teams to Tiebreakers
Relegated to 2015 qualifying round

Province	Skip	W	L
Nova Scotia	Alan O'Leary	9	2
Manitoba	Kelly Robertson	9	2
Northern Ontario	Robbie Gordon	8	3
Alberta	Mark Johnson	8	3
Saskatchewan	Darrell McKee	5	6
Ontario	Peter Mellor	5	6
Yukon	George Hilderman	5	6
British Columbia	Wes Craig	5	6
Quebec	Denis Laflamme	4	7
New Brunswick	Mark Armstrong	3	8
Northwest Territories	Glen Hudy	3	8
Prince Edward Island	Ted MacFadyen	2	9

== Round-robin results ==
All times listed are in Mountain Standard Time (UTC−7).

=== Draw 2 ===
Saturday, March 22, 7:00 pm

Sheet A	1	2	3	4	5	6	7	8	9	10	Final
Northern Ontario (Gordon)	2	0	1	0	3	0	1	0	1	2	10
Northwest Territories (Hudy)	0	0	0	1	0	1	0	1	0	0	3

Sheet B	1	2	3	4	5	6	7	8	9	10	11	Final
Saskatchewan (McKee)	1	1	0	0	0	3	0	1	0	1	1	8
British Columbia (Craig)	0	0	1	1	2	0	0	0	3	0	0	7

Sheet C	1	2	3	4	5	6	7	8	9	10	Final
Nova Scotia (O'Leary)	2	0	0	3	0	1	2	1	X	X	9
Prince Edward Island (MacFadyen)	0	0	0	0	3	0	0	0	X	X	3

Sheet E	1	2	3	4	5	6	7	8	9	10	Final
Alberta (Johnson)	0	2	0	0	0	1	2	1	0	0	6
Yukon (Hilderman)	1	0	0	0	1	0	0	0	1	1	4

Sheet F	1	2	3	4	5	6	7	8	9	10	Final
New Brunswick (Armstrong)	0	1	0	0	2	0	1	1	X	X	5
Manitoba (Robertson)	2	0	3	3	0	4	0	0	X	X	12

Sheet H	1	2	3	4	5	6	7	8	9	10	11	Final
Quebec (Laflamme)	0	0	2	0	0	0	0	1	0	1	0	4
Ontario (Mellor)	0	1	0	2	0	0	0	0	1	0	2	6

=== Draw 3 ===
Sunday, March 23, 9:00 am

Sheet C	1	2	3	4	5	6	7	8	9	10	Final
New Brunswick (Armstrong)	1	0	0	2	0	2	1	0	0	2	8
Quebec (Laflamme)	0	1	0	0	3	0	0	1	1	0	6

Sheet E	1	2	3	4	5	6	7	8	9	10	Final
Saskatchewan (McKee)	1	0	0	1	0	2	0	0	2	0	6
Nova Scotia (O'Leary)	0	2	1	0	1	0	0	2	0	1	7

Sheet G	1	2	3	4	5	6	7	8	9	10	Final
Yukon (Hilderman)	3	0	1	2	2	1	0	2	X	X	11
Ontario (Mellor)	0	1	0	0	0	0	1	0	X	X	2

Sheet H	1	2	3	4	5	6	7	8	9	10	Final
Northwest Territories (Hudy)	0	0	1	2	0	0	2	0	1	1	7
Prince Edward Island (MacFadyen)	0	1	0	0	1	2	0	1	0	0	5

=== Draw 4 ===
Sunday, March 23, 2:00 pm

Sheet C	1	2	3	4	5	6	7	8	9	10	Final
Northern Ontario (Gordon)	1	2	2	0	0	0	1	0	1	X	7
Manitoba (Robertson)	0	0	0	1	2	0	0	1	0	X	4

Sheet E	1	2	3	4	5	6	7	8	9	10	11	Final
Prince Edward Island (MacFadyen)	2	0	0	3	0	1	1	1	0	2	0	10
Yukon (Hilderman)	0	2	4	0	2	0	0	0	2	0	1	11

Sheet G	1	2	3	4	5	6	7	8	9	10	Final
British Columbia (Craig)	0	1	2	2	0	0	0	2	1	X	8
New Brunswick (Armstrong)	1	0	0	0	1	0	2	0	0	X	4

Sheet H	1	2	3	4	5	6	7	8	9	10	Final
Alberta (Johnson)	1	3	0	0	1	1	0	4	X	X	10
Quebec (Laflamme)	0	0	0	2	0	0	0	0	X	X	2

=== Draw 5 ===
Sunday, March 23, 7:00 pm

Sheet C	1	2	3	4	5	6	7	8	9	10	Final
Ontario (Mellor)	3	0	2	0	2	3	0	0	2	X	12
Northwest Territories (Hudy)	0	2	0	2	0	0	2	1	0	X	7

Sheet E	1	2	3	4	5	6	7	8	9	10	11	Final
Alberta (Johnson)	1	1	0	0	2	0	4	0	1	0	0	9
British Columbia (Craig)	0	0	2	1	0	2	0	2	0	2	2	11

Sheet G	1	2	3	4	5	6	7	8	9	10	Final
Northern Ontario (Gordon)	1	0	1	1	0	1	0	1	0	0	5
Nova Scotia (O'Leary)	0	3	0	0	1	0	2	0	1	1	8

Sheet H	1	2	3	4	5	6	7	8	9	10	Final
Manitoba (Robertson)	1	0	1	0	2	0	1	3	1	X	9
Saskatchewan (McKee)	0	1	0	1	0	2	0	0	0	X	4

=== Draw 6 ===
Monday, March 24, 9:00 am

Sheet A	1	2	3	4	5	6	7	8	9	10	Final
Yukon (Hilderman)	0	1	0	1	0	1	1	2	0	0	6
Northern Ontario (Gordon)	2	0	2	0	2	0	0	0	2	3	11

Sheet B	1	2	3	4	5	6	7	8	9	10	Final
New Brunswick (Armstrong)	0	1	0	0	1	0	0	2	0	X	4
Alberta (Johnson)	1	0	2	2	0	2	1	0	1	X	9

Sheet D	1	2	3	4	5	6	7	8	9	10	Final
British Columbia (Craig)	0	0	2	0	0	2	0	3	2	0	9
Quebec (Laflamme)	1	1	0	1	1	0	1	0	0	2	7

Sheet F	1	2	3	4	5	6	7	8	9	10	Final
Manitoba (Robertson)	4	0	0	0	4	0	5	X	X	X	13
Prince Edward Island (MacFadyen)	0	1	1	0	0	2	0	X	X	X	4

=== Draw 7 ===
Monday, March 24, 2:00 pm

Sheet A	1	2	3	4	5	6	7	8	9	10	Final
Ontario (Mellor)	2	0	2	0	2	0	0	0	2	2	10
British Columbia (Craig)	0	1	0	1	0	2	1	0	0	0	5

Sheet B	1	2	3	4	5	6	7	8	9	10	11	Final
Northern Ontario (Gordon)	1	0	0	1	0	1	1	0	3	0	1	8
Saskatchewan (McKee)	0	1	1	0	2	0	0	1	0	2	0	7

Sheet D	1	2	3	4	5	6	7	8	9	10	Final
Manitoba (Robertson)	2	0	1	0	1	0	1	0	2	0	7
Nova Scotia (O'Leary)	0	2	0	2	0	1	0	1	0	3	9

Sheet F	1	2	3	4	5	6	7	8	9	10	Final
Northwest Territories (Hudy)	0	0	0	0	0	0	2	0	X	X	2
Alberta (Johnson)	2	0	3	1	1	2	0	2	X	X	11

=== Draw 8 ===
Monday, March 24, 7:00 pm

Sheet A	1	2	3	4	5	6	7	8	9	10	Final
Nova Scotia (O'Leary)	2	0	0	1	0	1	0	2	0	2	8
New Brunswick (Armstrong)	0	1	2	0	1	0	1	0	2	0	7

Sheet B	1	2	3	4	5	6	7	8	9	10	11	Final
Prince Edward Island (MacFadyen)	0	0	2	0	2	0	0	1	0	0	0	5
Ontario (Mellor)	0	1	0	1	0	2	0	0	0	1	1	6

Sheet D	1	2	3	4	5	6	7	8	9	10	Final
Yukon (Hilderman)	3	0	0	0	2	1	0	2	X	X	8
Northwest Territories (Hudy)	0	1	0	0	0	0	1	0	X	X	2

Sheet F	1	2	3	4	5	6	7	8	9	10	Final
Saskatchewan (McKee)	0	0	4	0	0	2	0	0	1	0	7
Quebec (Laflamme)	0	2	0	0	1	0	1	2	0	2	8

=== Draw 9 ===
Tuesday, March 25, 9:00 am

Sheet C	1	2	3	4	5	6	7	8	9	10	Final
Alberta (Johnson)	0	2	2	1	0	3	0	2	X	X	10
Nova Scotia (O'Leary)	2	0	0	0	1	0	1	0	X	X	4

Sheet E	1	2	3	4	5	6	7	8	9	10	Final
Ontario (Mellor)	0	0	0	0	2	0	0	X	X	X	2
Manitoba (Robertson)	1	1	2	1	0	1	3	X	X	X	9

Sheet G	1	2	3	4	5	6	7	8	9	10	Final
Saskatchewan (McKee)	1	0	1	0	0	3	0	1	0	X	6
Northwest Territories (Hudy)	0	2	0	1	3	0	3	0	1	X	10

Sheet H	1	2	3	4	5	6	7	8	9	10	Final
British Columbia (Craig)	1	0	2	0	1	0	1	1	1	0	7
Northern Ontario (Gordon)	0	1	0	3	0	2	0	0	0	2	8

=== Draw 10 ===
Tuesday, March 25, 2:00 pm

Sheet C	1	2	3	4	5	6	7	8	9	10	Final
Yukon (Hilderman)	0	2	0	0	0	1	0	2	1	0	6
Saskatchewan (McKee)	2	0	2	2	1	0	2	0	0	1	10

Sheet E	1	2	3	4	5	6	7	8	9	10	Final
Northwest Territories (Hudy)	0	1	1	0	0	2	0	2	1	X	7
New Brunswick (Armstrong)	3	0	0	3	2	0	1	0	0	X	9

Sheet G	1	2	3	4	5	6	7	8	9	10	Final
Quebec (Laflamme)	0	0	1	0	0	1	0	2	0	X	4
Prince Edward Island (MacFadyen)	0	2	0	0	1	0	1	0	3	X	7

Sheet H	1	2	3	4	5	6	7	8	9	10	11	Final
Nova Scotia (O'Leary)	0	3	0	0	1	0	0	2	0	0	2	8
Ontario (Mellor)	1	0	1	1	0	2	0	0	0	1	0	6

=== Draw 11 ===
Tuesday, March 25, 7:00 pm

Sheet C	1	2	3	4	5	6	7	8	9	10	Final
Prince Edward Island (MacFadyen)	2	0	0	0	0	0	2	0	0	1	5
British Columbia (Craig)	0	1	1	0	1	1	0	1	1	0	6

Sheet E	1	2	3	4	5	6	7	8	9	10	11	Final
Quebec (Laflamme)	0	0	0	2	0	1	0	4	0	0	2	9
Northern Ontario (Gordon)	1	1	0	0	2	0	0	0	2	1	0	7

Sheet G	1	2	3	4	5	6	7	8	9	10	Final
Alberta (Johnson)	0	0	0	0	2	1	0	2	X	X	5
Manitoba (Robertson)	2	2	3	2	0	0	1	0	X	X	10

Sheet H	1	2	3	4	5	6	7	8	9	10	Final
New Brunswick (Armstrong)	1	0	0	3	0	2	0	0	2	0	8
Yukon (Hilderman)	0	1	3	0	1	0	0	2	0	2	9

=== Draw 12 ===
Wednesday, March 26, 9:00 am

Sheet A	1	2	3	4	5	6	7	8	9	10	Final
Northwest Territories (Hudy)	1	2	0	1	0	1	0	0	1	0	6
Quebec (Laflamme)	0	0	2	0	1	0	0	2	0	4	9

Sheet B	1	2	3	4	5	6	7	8	9	10	Final
Nova Scotia (O'Leary)	0	2	0	2	1	0	2	0	1	2	10
Yukon (Hilderman)	1	0	2	0	0	2	0	2	0	0	7

Sheet D	1	2	3	4	5	6	7	8	9	10	Final
Saskatchewan (McKee)	0	0	0	1	0	2	0	2	X	X	5
Prince Edward Island (MacFadyen)	1	1	1	0	3	0	3	0	X	X	9

Sheet F	1	2	3	4	5	6	7	8	9	10	Final
Ontario (Mellor)	0	2	2	1	1	0	0	0	0	3	9
New Brunswick (Armstrong)	2	0	0	0	0	1	1	0	1	0	5

=== Draw 13 ===
Wednesday, March 26, 2:00 pm

Sheet A	1	2	3	4	5	6	7	8	9	10	Final
Prince Edward Island (MacFadyen)	0	1	0	0	0	1	0	X	X	X	2
Alberta (Johnson)	2	0	1	1	1	0	3	X	X	X	8

Sheet B	1	2	3	4	5	6	7	8	9	10	Final
Manitoba (Robertson)	1	0	0	2	0	3	0	1	0	1	8
Quebec (Laflamme)	0	1	0	0	1	0	2	0	2	0	6

Sheet D	1	2	3	4	5	6	7	8	9	10	Final
Northern Ontario (Gordon)	3	0	1	0	0	2	0	0	4	X	10
New Brunswick (Armstrong)	0	1	0	0	1	0	1	1	0	X	4

Sheet F	1	2	3	4	5	6	7	8	9	10	Final
Yukon (Hilderman)	0	0	3	1	0	4	0	1	0	0	9
British Columbia (Craig)	0	3	0	0	2	0	2	0	2	1	10

=== Draw 14 ===
Wednesday, March 26, 7:00 pm

Sheet A	1	2	3	4	5	6	7	8	9	10	Final
British Columbia (Craig)	0	1	0	0	0	2	2	0	1	0	6
Nova Scotia (O'Leary)	1	0	1	1	2	0	0	2	0	1	8

Sheet B	1	2	3	4	5	6	7	8	9	10	Final
Ontario (Mellor)	0	0	0	0	0	1	0	2	1	X	4
Northern Ontario (Gordon)	0	1	1	1	1	0	2	0	0	X	6

Sheet D	1	2	3	4	5	6	7	8	9	10	Final
Northwest Territories (Hudy)	0	2	0	2	0	2	0	0	X	X	6
Manitoba (Robertson)	2	0	1	0	4	0	3	1	X	X	11

Sheet F	1	2	3	4	5	6	7	8	9	10	Final
Alberta (Johnson)	0	1	0	0	1	0	1	1	1	0	5
Saskatchewan (McKee)	2	0	2	1	0	1	0	0	0	2	8

=== Draw 15 ===
Thursday, March 27, 9:00 am

Sheet C	1	2	3	4	5	6	7	8	9	10	Final
Quebec (Laflamme)	0	0	1	1	0	1	0	0	0	0	3
Yukon (Hilderman)	1	0	0	0	2	0	0	0	0	1	4

Sheet E	1	2	3	4	5	6	7	8	9	10	Final
New Brunswick (Armstrong)	0	1	0	4	0	0	2	0	3	X	10
Prince Edward Island (MacFadyen)	0	0	1	0	1	1	0	2	0	X	5

Sheet G	1	2	3	4	5	6	7	8	9	10	Final
Manitoba (Robertson)	0	2	1	4	0	0	1	2	X	X	10
British Columbia (Craig)	1	0	0	0	2	1	0	0	X	X	4

Sheet H	1	2	3	4	5	6	7	8	9	10	Final
Northern Ontario (Gordon)	1	0	0	1	0	1	0	1	X	X	4
Alberta (Johnson)	0	2	1	0	3	0	2	0	X	X	8

=== Draw 16 ===
Thursday, March 27, 2:00 pm

Sheet A	1	2	3	4	5	6	7	8	9	10	Final
New Brunswick (Armstrong)	0	1	0	0	2	0	0	0	0	X	3
Saskatchewan (McKee)	1	0	1	1	0	0	0	0	2	X	5

Sheet B	1	2	3	4	5	6	7	8	9	10	Final
British Columbia (Craig)	1	0	1	0	0	0	0	1	0	X	3
Northwest Territories (Hudy)	0	1	0	2	1	1	1	0	1	X	7

Sheet D	1	2	3	4	5	6	7	8	9	10	Final
Ontario (Mellor)	0	0	0	0	1	0	0	1	1	0	3
Alberta (Johnson)	0	0	1	0	0	1	0	0	0	4	6

Sheet F	1	2	3	4	5	6	7	8	9	10	11	Final
Quebec (Laflamme)	0	1	1	0	1	0	1	0	2	0	2	8
Nova Scotia (O'Leary)	0	0	0	1	0	1	0	3	0	1	0	6

=== Draw 17 ===
Thursday, March 27, 7:00 pm

Sheet A	1	2	3	4	5	6	7	8	9	10	Final
Manitoba (Robertson)	3	0	0	2	0	2	1	0	2	X	10
Yukon (Hilderman)	0	1	1	0	2	0	0	1	0	X	5

Sheet C	1	2	3	4	5	6	7	8	9	10	Final
Saskatchewan (McKee)	0	2	0	2	0	0	2	0	1	1	8
Ontario (Mellor)	1	0	1	0	1	4	0	0	0	0	7

Sheet E	1	2	3	4	5	6	7	8	9	10	Final
Nova Scotia (O'Leary)	0	3	0	1	0	0	2	3	0	X	9
Northwest Territories (Hudy)	1	0	1	0	2	1	0	0	1	X	6

Sheet F	1	2	3	4	5	6	7	8	9	10	Final
Prince Edward Island (MacFadyen)	0	1	1	0	0	0	0	X	X	X	2
Northern Ontario (Gordon)	1	0	0	1	3	0	3	X	X	X	8

== Tiebreaker ==
Friday, March 28, 1:30 pm

Sheet A	1	2	3	4	5	6	7	8	9	10	Final
Northern Ontario (Gordon)	0	2	0	3	0	1	0	2	0	1	9
Alberta (Johnson)	0	0	2	0	1	0	1	0	2	0	6

== Playoffs ==
Semifinal			Final
			1	Nova Scotia	9
2	Manitoba	10	2	Manitoba	8
3	Northern Ontario	8

=== Semifinal ===
Friday, March 28, 6:30 pm

Sheet D	1	2	3	4	5	6	7	8	9	10	Final
Manitoba (Robertson)	0	2	0	3	0	2	0	2	0	1	10
Northern Ontario (Gordon)	0	0	3	0	2	0	1	0	2	0	8

=== Final ===
Saturday, March 29, 2:30 pm

Sheet B	1	2	3	4	5	6	7	8	9	10	Final
Nova Scotia (O'Leary)	2	0	1	1	0	2	0	1	0	2	9
Manitoba (Robertson)	0	2	0	0	2	0	3	0	1	0	8
