= 2018 Viterra Championship =

- Host city: Winkler, Manitoba
- Arena: Winkler Centennial Arena
- Dates: January 31–February 4
- Winner: Team Carruthers
- Curling club: West St. Paul CC, West St. Paul
- Skip: Reid Carruthers
- Third: Braeden Moskowy
- Second: Derek Samagalski
- Lead: Colin Hodgson
- Finalist: Mike McEwen

The 2018 Viterra Championship, Manitoba's provincial men's curling championship, was held from January 31 to February 4 at the Winkler Centennial Arena in Winkler. The winning Reid Carruthers team represented Manitoba at the 2018 Tim Hortons Brier in Regina, Saskatchewan.

The semifinal and final games were broadcast on Sportsnet One.

== Teams ==
Teams are as follows:

Skip	Third	Second	Lead	Alternate	Club
Travis Bale	Andrew Irving	Geoff Lang	Brad Van Walleghem	Roy Janz	Fort Rouge
Daniel Birchard	Kelly Fordyce	Brody Moore	Andrew Peck		Pembina
David Bohn	Justin Richter	Tyler Forrest	Bryce McEwen		Assiniboine
Dennis Bohn	Neil Kitching	Kennedy Bird	Daniel Hunt		Assiniboine
Braden Calvert	Kyle Kurz	Lucas Van Den Bosch	Brendan Wilson		Deer Lodge
Reid Carruthers	Braeden Moskowy	Derek Samagalski	Colin Hodgson		West St Paul
Tyler Drews	Joshua Drews	Daryl Evans	Jake Zelenewich	Kyle Allenby	Fort Rouge
Cale Dunbar	Shayne MacGranachan	Cody Chatham	Kyle Sambrook		Riverview
Rob Fisher	Jason Yates	Mike Csversko	Lawson Yates	Darcy Todoruk	Dauphin
Kyle Foster	Shawn Magnusson	Kyle Einarson	Justin Reischek		Arborg
Graham Freeman	Brooks Freeman	Cory Barkley	Dwayne Barkley	Kevin Barkley	Virden
Darryl Friesen	Ernie Funk	Jamie Wall	Reg Funk	Greg Hrehirchuk	St Vital
Travis Graham	Grant Brown	Shaun Kennedy	Jeff Ziemanski		Burntwood
Sean Grassie	Ty Dilello	Devin McArthur	Chad Barkman		Deer Lodge
Jason Gunnlaugson	Alex Forrest	Ian McMillan	Connor Njegovan		Granite
Steve Irwin	Travis Taylor	Travis Brooks	Travis Saban	Rob Van Deynze	Brandon
Julien Leduc	Brett Moxham	Ben Woelk	Hugh McFarlane	Corey Chambers	Granite
Tanner Lott	Justin Reynolds	Wade Ford	Nick Weshnoweski	Dan Winters	Winnipeg Beach
William Lyburn	Richard Daneault	Jared Kolomaya	Braden Zawada	Jim Coleman	Assiniboine
Kelly Marnoch	Bart Witherspoon	Branden Jorgensen	Chris Cameron	Rob Van Kommer	Carberry
Mike McEwen (Note: McEwen was hospitalized from the second draw until the semifinals due to having chicken pox. Except for the first draw and the final, the team played with just three players, with B. J. Neufeld assuming skipping duties. McEwen skipped and threw third stones in the final.)	B. J. Neufeld	Matt Wozniak	Denni Neufeld		Fort Rouge
Terry McNamee	Brendan Taylor	Geordie Hargreaves	Trevor Calvert		Brandon
Richard Muntain	Mike McCaughan	Rylan Young	Stu Shiells	Curtis McCannell	Pinawa
Randy Neufeld	Peter Nicholls	Dean Dunstone	Dale Michie		La Salle
Brandon Radford	Brett MacDonald	Carter Watkins	Austin Pearson	Neal Watkins	Swan River
JT Ryan	Jacques Gauthier	Colin Kurz	Brendan Bilawka	Graham McFarlane	Assiniboine
Merv Satterthwaite	Brent Griffin	Ken Armstrong	Heinz Warkentin	Mike Zwarycz	St Vital
Pat Simmons	Colton Lott	Kyle Doering	Rob Gordon		Granite
Riley Smith	Nick Curtis	Jared Hancox	Trevor Grenkow	Colin Grenkow	Fort Rouge
Ryan Thomson	Kyle Peters	Mark Georges	Evan Gillis	Mitch Halstead	Morden
Brett Walter	Zachary Wasylik	Chase Dusessoy	Liam Tod	Thomas Dunlop	Elmwood
Andrew Wickman	Ryan Hlatkey	Justin Paddock	Rodney Legault		Fort Rouge

== Knockout Brackets ==
32 team double knockout with playoff round
Four teams qualify each from A Event and B Event

=== A Event ===
First Knockout	Qualifier 1
Riley Smith	2
Terry McNamee	6
Terry McNamee	1
Reid Carruthers	11
Reid Carruthers	8
Rob Fisher	1
Reid Carruthers	10
David Bohn	6
David Bohn	8
Cale Dunbar	6
David Bohn	7
Julien Leduc	3
Sean Grassie	4
Julien Leduc	5

First Knockout	Qualifier 2
Graham Freeman	5
Travis Bale	7
Travis Bale	9
Darryl Friesen	3
Braden Calvert	2
Darryl Friesen	9
Travis Bale	6
Daniel Birchard	2
Jason Gunnlaugson	11
Travis Graham	1
Jason Gunnlaugson	5
Daniel Birchard	8
Kelly Marnoch	6
Daniel Birchard	10

First Knockout	Qualifier 3
Andrew Wickman	7
Randy Neufeld	8
Randy Neufeld	3
Pat Simmons	6
Pat Simmons	10
Brandon Radford	2
Pat Simmons	6
William Lyburn	2
Brett Walter	7
William Lyburn	8
William Lyburn	10
Tyler Drews	4
Steve Irwin	1
Tyler Drews	8

First Knockout	Qualifier 4
Richard Muntain	7
Tanner Lott	6
Richard Muntain	6
Team McEwen	11
Merv Satterthwaite	2
Mike McEwen	9
Team McEwen	7
Dennis Bohn	5
Dennis Bohn	6
Ryan Thomson	3
Dennis Bohn	9
Kyle Foster	7
JT Ryan	4
Kyle Foster	6

=== B Event ===
Second Knockout	Qualifier 5
Julien Leduc	9
Riley Smith	4	Rob Fisher	7	David Bohn	8
Rob Fisher	12	Julien Leduc	2	Terry McNamee	3
Terry McNamee	7
Terry McNamee	9
Cale Dunbar	8	Cale Dunbar	2
Sean Grassie	5

Second Knockout	Qualifier 6
Jason Gunnlaugson	6
Graham Freeman	10	Graham Freeman	8	Daniel Birchard	7
Braden Calvert	3	Graham Freeman	11	Graham Freeman	3
Darryl Friesen	3
Darryl Friesen	10
Travis Graham	2	Kelly Marnoch	6
Kelly Marnoch	8

Second Knockout	Qualifier 7
Tyler Drews	9
Andrew Wickman	7	Andrew Wickman	6	William Lyburn	5
Brandon Radford	4	Tyler Drews	5	Steve Irwin	8
Steve Irwin	6
Randy Neufeld	3
Brett Walter	4	Steve Irwin	4
Steve Irwin	9

Second Knockout	Qualifier 8
Kyle Foster	7
Tanner Lott	7	Tanner Lott	1	Dennis Bohn	3
Merv Satterthwaite	1	Kyle Foster	6	JT Ryan	9
JT Ryan	7
Richard Muntain	6
Ryan Thomson	5	JT Ryan	8
JT Ryan	11

== Playoff Brackets ==
=== A event ===
8 team double knockout
Four teams qualify into Championship Round

First Knockout
Q1	Reid Carruthers	8
Q6	Daniel Birchard	0
Q2	Travis Bale	6
Q5	David Bohn	2

Qualifier 1
Q1	Reid Carruthers	8
Q2	Travis Bale	4

First Knockout
Q3	Pat Simmons	5
Q8	J.T. Ryan	9
Q4	Team McEwen	8
Q7	Steve Irwin	2

Qualifier 2
Q8	J.T. Ryan	3
Q4	Team McEwen	5

=== B event ===
Second Knockout			Qualifier 3
			Q8	J.T. Ryan	7
Q6	Daniel Birchard	6	Q6	Daniel Birchard	5
Q5	David Bohn	5

Second Knockout			Qualifier 4
			Q2	Travis Bale	5
Q3	Pat Simmons	8	Q7	Steve Irwin	8
Q7	Steve Irwin	9

== Championship round ==
Page playoff system
1	Reid Carruthers	7
2	Team McEwen	4
3	J.T. Ryan	5
4	Steve Irwin	3

Semifinal
2	Team McEwen	6
3	J.T. Ryan	2

Final
1	Reid Carruthers	7
2	Team McEwen	6

=== 1 vs. 2 ===
Saturday, February 3, 6:00 pm

Sheet D	1	2	3	4	5	6	7	8	9	10	Final
Reid Carruthers	0	2	0	2	0	0	2	1	0	X	7
Team McEwen 🔨	1	0	0	0	2	0	0	0	1	X	4

=== 3 vs. 4 ===
Saturday, February 3, 6:00 pm

Sheet C	1	2	3	4	5	6	7	8	9	10	Final
J.T. Ryan	0	0	0	1	0	0	2	0	1	1	5
Steve Irwin 🔨	0	0	1	0	1	0	0	1	0	0	3

=== Semifinal ===
Sunday, February 4, 8:30 am

Sheet C	1	2	3	4	5	6	7	8	9	10	Final
Team McEwen 🔨	2	2	0	0	1	0	1	0	X	X	6
J.T. Ryan	0	0	0	1	0	0	0	1	X	X	2

=== Final ===
Sunday, February 4, 3:00 pm

Sheet C	1	2	3	4	5	6	7	8	9	10	Final
Reid Carruthers 🔨	0	2	0	2	0	1	1	0	0	1	7
Mike McEwen	0	0	2	0	1	0	0	2	1	0	6

2018 Viterra Championship

Reid Carruthers
5th Manitoba Provincial Championship title
