= Doug Hamlin =

CEO of the National Rifle Association since 2024

Douglas Hamlin is an American publisher and businessman who has been chief executive officer (CEO) and executive vice president (EVP) of the National Rifle Association (NRA) since 2024.

Hamlin served the United States Marine Corps for six years before working in publishing. He worked for the Petersen Publishing Company, publishing Motor Trend and Guns & Ammo. He joined the NRA as executive director of publications in 2013, where the NRA credited him with saving the organization US$30 million by improving efficiency. He was appointed CEO and EVP in May 2024, marketed as a reformist against previous CEO Wayne LaPierre. After being appointed CEO, a case resurfaced where Hamlin and four Alpha Delta Phi fraternity members at the University of Michigan tortured and killed a cat in 1979, leading to calls to suspend Hamlin.

== Early life and career ==
Douglas Hamlin was raised in Michigan. He was an infantry weapons officer and recruiter for the United States Marine Corps for six years before working in publishing. He worked for the Petersen Publishing Company for 14 years and was the vice president and group publisher for Motor Trend and publisher of Guns & Ammo from 1991 to 1995. In the 1990s, he founded autoMedia Solutions, an automotive news company.

=== 1979 animal cruelty incident ===
While an undergraduate at the University of Michigan and president of the university's chapter of Alpha Delta Phi fraternity, Hamlin was implicated with four other members in the death of the fraternity cat, B.K., on December 6, 1979. According to local media, for failure to use a litter box, the cat's paws were cut off and it was hung on a tree and burned to death. While Hamlin's role in the killing is unclear, judge S.J. Elden later held him responsible for not using his power as president to prevent the killing. After the killing, other students and animal rights advocates wore armbands and buttons in memory of B.K. According to Earl Carl, who worked as a cook at the fraternity house, the fraternity attempted to cover up the killing, telling members not to cooperate with law enforcement or the media and threatening those who spoke out. Carl described Hamlin as "one of three people directly putting pressure on me to say nothing to the media or the police". The five, including Hamlin, were later expelled by the national fraternity. They were charged with misdemeanor animal cruelty, to which they pleaded no contest in March 1980. They were fined US$360, given one year deferred sentences, and sentenced to 200 hours of animal-related community service. The criminal records of the members were expunged after the community service.

The case resurfaced in a report by The Guardian after Hamlin became CEO of the NRA. Nick Suplina, senior vice president for law and policy for Everytown for Gun Safety, said that "[t]his revelation shows that the NRA has failed to turn the page on its scandal-plagued leaders and its doom spiral continues with Hamlin at the helm". In response to a request for comment from The Independent, Hamlin said:

I do not in any way condone the actions that took place more than 44 years ago. I took responsibility for this regrettable incident as chapter president although I wasn’t directly involved. Since that time I served my country, raised a family, volunteered in my community, started a business, worked with Gold Star families, and raised millions of dollars for charity. I’ve endeavored to live my life in a manner beyond reproach. My focus now is on protecting the Second Amendment rights of law-abiding citizens.

After the case resurfaced, anonymous employees sent a letter to the NRA board of directors asking them to suspend Hamlin, saying that "[i]f something is not done, Doug Hamlin will destroy any chances of a NRA comeback".

== National Rifle Association ==
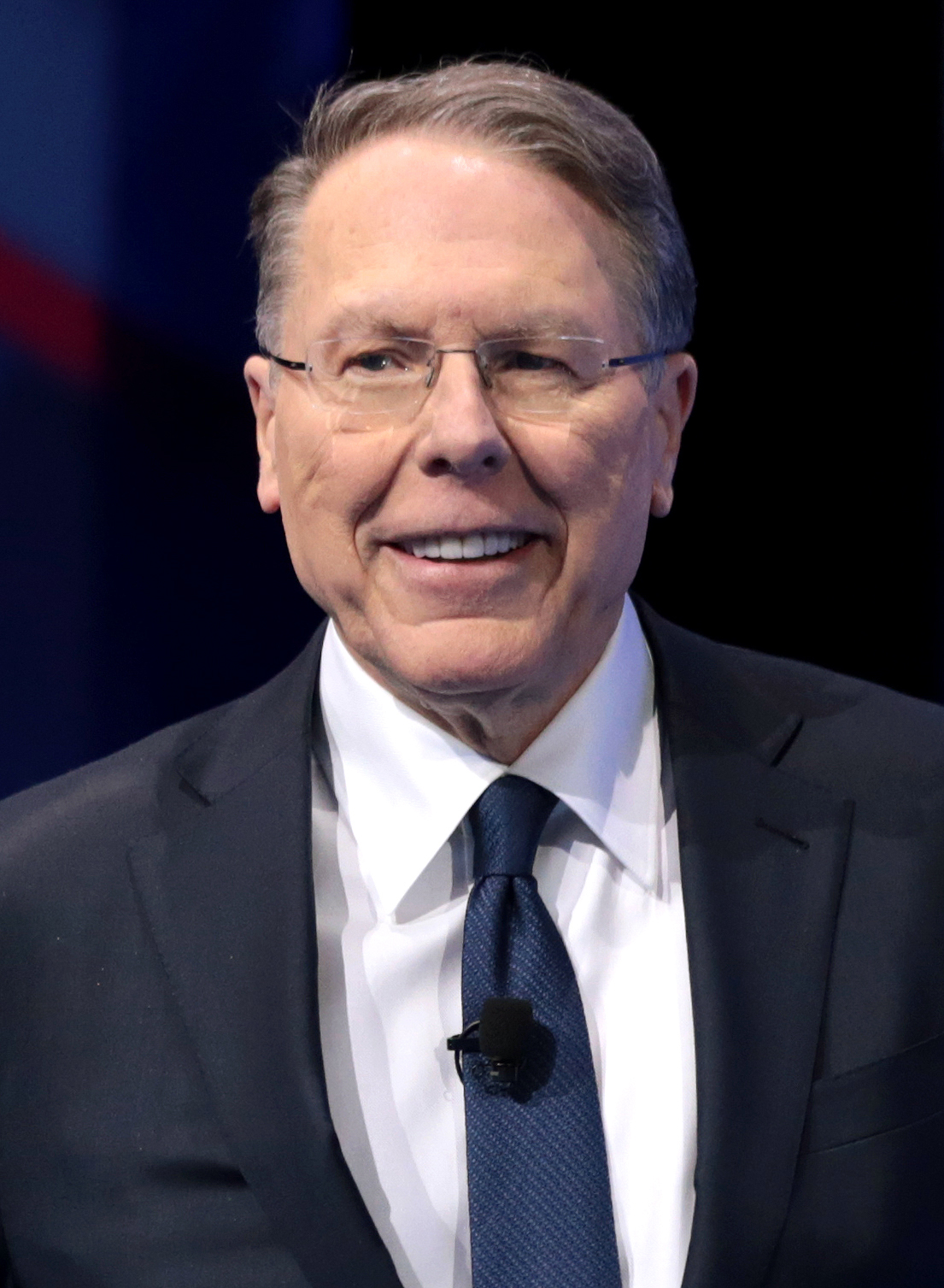
NRA CEO Wayne LaPierre named Hamlin as a potential successor of his in 2021.

Hamlin joined the NRA in 2014 and served as executive director of NRA Publications. According to the NRA, he saved the organization US$30 million as executive director of publications by increasing the efficiency of production and moving production of America's First Freedom in-house. In 2018, he was accused by a group of whistleblowers of receiving around US$25,000 in inappropriate reimbursements on living expenses from then-CEO Wayne LaPierre, which was used as evidence in a 2018 lawsuit between the state of New York and the NRA. LaPierre named Hamlin as a possible successor of his during the NRA's 2021 bankruptcy filing.

I am truly humbled to be elected by the NRA Board of Directors as the next Executive Vice President & CEO of the NRA. Our Association is at a decisive moment in our history, and the future of America and constitutional freedoms depends on the success of the NRA. I look forward to working with NRA staff to execute NRA’s gold standard programs and promote political and public policies that are in the best interest of our members and all gun owners.

— Hamlin on being elected CEO and EVP of the NRA

On May 20, 2024, the NRA board of directors elected Hamlin, who was described as a reformist against LaPierre loyalists, as chief executive officer and executive vice president, following the resignation of LaPierre amid corruption allegations. After his appointment, Hamlin appointed Randy Kozuch as executive director of the NRA Institute for Legislative Action and Joseph P. De Bergalis Jr. as executive director of NRA general operations. Before Hamlin's appointment, an open letter of anonymous NRA employees asked the board not to appoint Hamlin, saying he "operates entirely in the red and doesn’t know how to run an organization".

After he was appointed CEO, Hamlin vowed to rebuild the NRA, attempting to regain members lost under LaPierre, grow NRA training programs, and support the growing amount of women and minority groups using guns. He set a membership goal of 10 million, which would be a record high and 6 million more than the organization had when he was appointed CEO.

After his selection as CEO, Hamlin fought with president Bob Barr, a LaPierre loyalist, former U.S. Representative, and the Libertarian candidate in the 2008 United States presidential election, who was elected alongside Hamlin.

== Publications ==
- "Tim Walz, Second Amendment opportunist". The Washington Times. August 15, 2024.
