= Derek Samagalski =

Canadian curler (born 1984)

- Curler
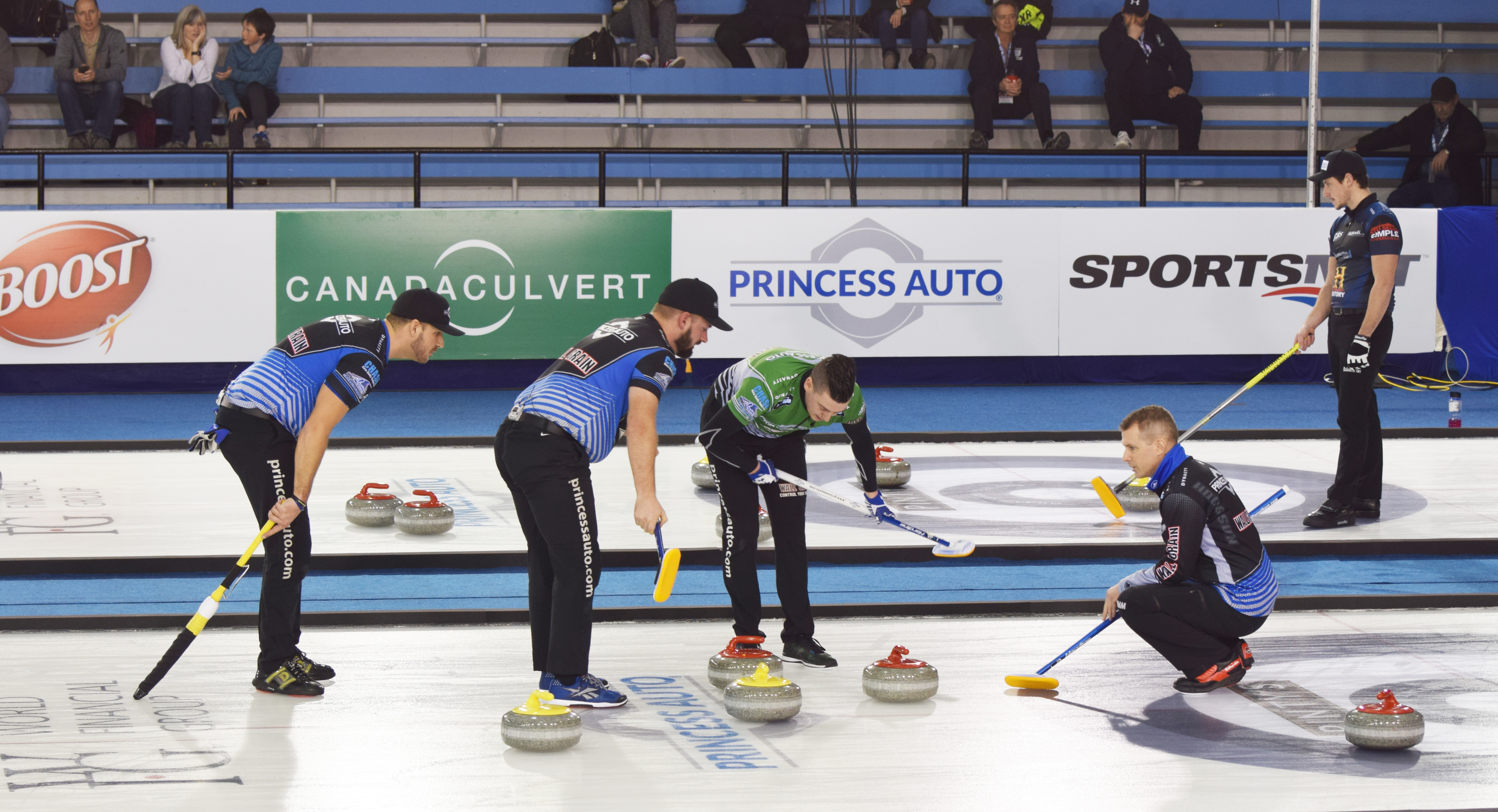
- Samagalski (far left) watches his shot at the 2018 Elite 10 event.
- Born: September 9, 1984 (age 42); Winnipeg, Manitoba, Canada

Team
- Curling club: West St. Paul CC, West St. Paul, MB
- Skip: Derek Samagalski
- Third: Sheldon Wettig
- Second: Christian Smitheran
- Lead: Justin McDonell
- Mixed doubles partner: Krysten Karwacki

Curling career
- Member Association: Manitoba (2011–2025); Nunavut (2025–present)
- Brier: 10 (2012, 2015, 2018, 2019, 2020, 2021, 2022, 2023, 2024, 2026)
- Top CTRS ranking: 2nd (2016–17)
- Grand Slam victories: 1 (2016 Champions Cup)
Medal record
Men's Curling
Representing Manitoba
Tim Hortons Brier
Bronze medal – third place	2012 Saskatoon

Derek Samagalski (born September 9, 1984) is a Canadian curler who currently resides in Carberry, Manitoba.

== Career ==
Samagalski gained notoriety when he won the 2012 Safeway Championship as a lead on the Rob Fowler team to represent Manitoba at the Tim Hortons Brier. Samagalski was named the first-team all star for lead at the Brier following their bronze medal victory.

Samagalski would then join the Reid Carruthers rink as second during the 2014–15 curling season, alongside Braeden Moskowy, and Colin Hodgson. The team would go on to win the 2015 Safeway Championship, earning the right to represent Manitoba at the 2015 Tim Hortons Brier. At the Brier, Carruthers led his team to a disappointing 4–7 finish.

The Carruthers rink in their second season together would have an excellent Grand Slam season in 2015-2016 reaching 3 finals, reaching the quarters or better in 6 of 7 Grand Slam events, and winning his first Grand Slam event at the Champions Cup by defeating John Epping of Ontario in the final. However, they were unable to defend their Manitoba title in 2016, losing in the semi-finals. In 2017, the Carruthers rink would lose 8–7 in the Manitoba final to Mike McEwen, losing out on a return to the Brier. However, in the Grand Slams that season, Carruthers would have another strong season, with a final, semi final, and quarter final in their 4 Grand Slam events of the year. That season, the Carruthers rink would also win the 2016 Canada Cup of Curling.

As winners of the 2016 Canada Cup of Curling, Carruthers qualified for the 2017 Canadian Olympic Curling Trials, where the team finished with a 4–4 record, missing the playoffs. The team would finally win another Manitoba championship in 2018, defeating Mike McEwen in the final. At the 2018 Tim Hortons Brier, the team missed the playoffs, going 5–6. After the Brier, Moskowy left the team and was later announced that McEwen would be joining the rink as the skip for the 2018-19 curling season.

With McEwen joining the team, they had a strong WCT tour season, winning the Stu Sells Toronto Tankard, Karuizawa International and the Ed Werenich Golden Wrench Classic. They also were successful at the 2019 Viterra Championship, defeating William Lyburn in the final. At the 2019 Tim Hortons Brier, they finished with a 6–5 record, just missing the playoffs. Team McEwen had a more successful following season. On the WCT tour, they never missed the playoffs and they won one event, the inaugural WCT Uiseong International Curling Cup. In Grand Slam play, they reached the quarterfinals of the Tour Challenge and the National and the semifinals of the Canadian Open. They would not defend their provincial title, losing the final of the 2020 Viterra Championship to Jason Gunnlaugson. They would still compete at the 2020 Tim Hortons Brier though, winning the Wild Card spot over Glenn Howard in the play-in game. Team McEwen finished the round robin and championship pool with a 7–4 record, which was a four-way tie for fourth. They faced John Epping in the first round of tiebreakers where they lost 8–5 and were eliminated. It would be the team's last event of the season as both the Players' Championship and the Champions Cup Grand Slam events were cancelled due to the COVID-19 pandemic.

In their lone tour event of the 2020–21 season, Team McEwen won the 2020 Ashley HomeStore Curling Classic. Due to the COVID-19 pandemic in Manitoba, the 2021 provincial championship was cancelled. As the reigning provincials champions, Team Jason Gunnlaugson was chosen to represent Manitoba at the 2021 Tim Hortons Brier. However, due to many provinces cancelling their provincial championships due to the COVID-19 pandemic in Canada, Curling Canada added three Wild Card teams to the national championship, which were based on the CTRS standings from the 2019–20 season. Because Team McEwen ranked 5th on the CTRS and kept at least three of their four players together for the 2020–21 season, they got the first Wild Card spot at the 2021 Brier in Calgary, Alberta. At the Brier, they finished with a 4–4 record, missing the championship pool.

During the 2021–22 season, the McEwen team was able to win another provincial title at the 2022 Viterra Championship, beating Colton Lott 8–3 in the final, qualifying them to represent Manitoba at the 2022 Tim Hortons Brier, where they finished 5–3 in the round robin, but lost to fellow Manitoba team Jason Gunnlaugson in the tie-breaker, eliminating them from contention. At the end of the season, McEwen announced he would be leaving the team to form a new rink out of Saskatchewan. However, Samagalski and Carruthers formed a new team with Connor Njegovan and old teammate Jason Gunnlaugson, with Carruthers moving back to the skip position. However, partway through the 2022–23 curling season, it was announced that Gunnlaugson had left the Carruthers rink. The new Carruthers team decided to play in the 2023 Viterra Championship with only three players, where they would finish second, losing to Matt Dunstone in the final. However, Carruthers would qualify for the 2023 Tim Hortons Brier as a Wild Card team, based on their CTRS ranking. The Carruthers team would add Rob Gordon to their team as lead for the event, where they finished with a 4–4 record.

For the 2023–24 curling season, Carruthers, Samagalski, and Njegovan would join with 2014 Olympic Gold Medalist Brad Jacobs, with Jacobs skipping the team. The new Jacobs team would have a strong showing at the 2024 Viterra Championship, winning the provincial championship, beating Braden Calvert 6–3 in the final. They would go on to represent Manitoba at the 2024 Montana's Brier, where they finished 7–1 in the round robin, qualifying for the playoff round. However, they would lose against Gushue and Dunstone in the playoffs. At the end of the season, Jacobs announced he would be moving to Alberta to create a new team. Samagalski would then join the newly formed Jacques Gauthier team out of Winnipeg in the middle of the 2024–25 curling season, where they qualified for the 2025 Viterra Championship. At their first provincials together, the Gauthier rink would go on to finish tied for fifth at the event, with a 4–3 record.

In 2025, it was announced Samagalski would be skipping a team out of Nunavut for the 2025–26 season, alongside Sheldon Wettig, Christian Smitheran, and Justin McDonell. Samagalski would go on to win his first Nunavut Territorial title at the 2026 Nunavut Men's Curling Championship, representing Nunavut at the 2026 Montana's Brier. There, they would finish the round robin winless with an 0–8 record.

== Personal life ==
Samagalski is married and has two daughters. He is employed as a superintendent for Carberry Sandhills Golf Course.

== Teams ==
Season	Skip	Third	Second	Lead
2005–06	Reid Carruthers	Jason Gunnlaugson	Derek Samagalski	Tyler Forrest
2008–09	Reid Carruthers	Dan Kammerlock	Derek Samagalski	Shane Kilgallen
2009–10	Reid Carruthers	Chris Galbraith	Derek Samagalski	Shane Kilgallen
2010–11	Rob Fowler	Allan Lyburn	Richard Daneault	Derek Samagalski
2011–12	Rob Fowler	Allan Lyburn	Richard Daneault	Derek Samagalski
2012–13	Rob Fowler	Allan Lyburn	Richard Daneault	Derek Samagalski
2013–14	Rob Fowler	Allan Lyburn	Brendan Talyor	Derek Samagalski
2014–15	Reid Carruthers	Braeden Moskowy	Derek Samagalski	Colin Hodgson
2015–16	Reid Carruthers	Braeden Moskowy	Derek Samagalski	Colin Hodgson
2016–17	Reid Carruthers	Braeden Moskowy	Derek Samagalski	Colin Hodgson
2017–18	Reid Carruthers	Braeden Moskowy	Derek Samagalski	Colin Hodgson
2018–19	Mike McEwen (Fourth)	Reid Carruthers (Skip)	Derek Samagalski	Colin Hodgson
2019–20	Mike McEwen	Reid Carruthers	Derek Samagalski	Colin Hodgson
2020–21	Mike McEwen	Reid Carruthers	Derek Samagalski	Colin Hodgson
2021–22	Mike McEwen	Reid Carruthers	Derek Samagalski	Colin Hodgson
2022–23	Reid Carruthers	Jason Gunnlaugson (Sept.-Dec.)	Derek Samagalski	Connor Njegovan
2022–23	Reid Carruthers	Derek Samagalski	Connor Njegovan	Rob Gordon (Brier)
2023–24	Brad Jacobs	Reid Carruthers	Derek Samagalski	Connor Njegovan
2024–25	Jacques Gauthier	Derek Samagalski	Tanner Lott	Ronald Gauthier
2025–26	Derek Samagalski	Sheldon Wettig	Christian Smitheran	Justin McDonell
