= Reid Carruthers =

Canadian curler (born 1984)

- Curler
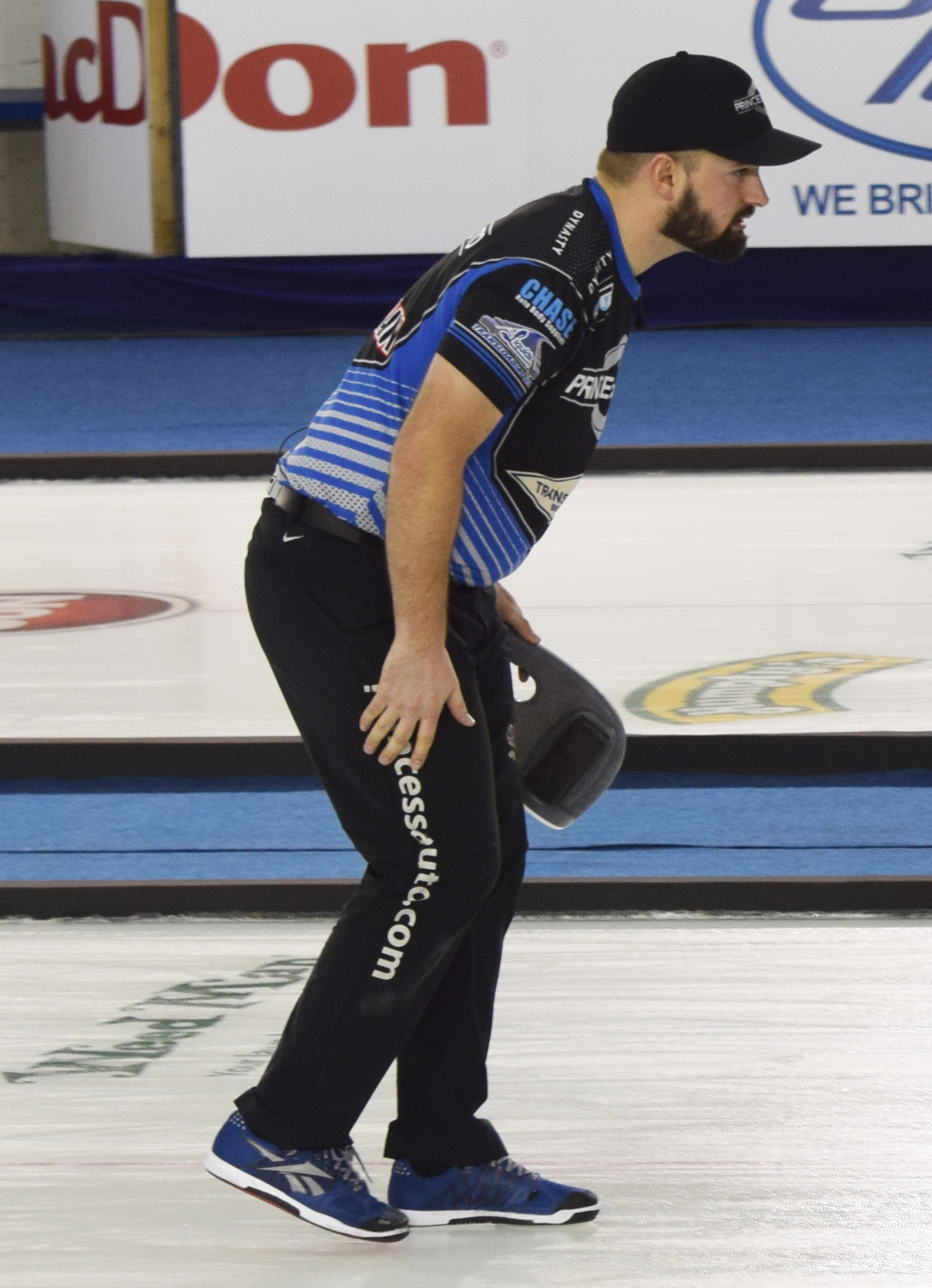
- Carruthers in 2018
- Born: December 30, 1984 (age 41); Winnipeg, Manitoba, Canada

Team
- Curling club: West St. Paul CC, West St. Paul, MB

Curling career
- Member Association: Manitoba
- Brier: 13 (2008, 2011, 2013, 2014, 2015, 2018, 2019, 2020, 2021, 2022, 2023, 2024, 2025)
- World Championship: 1 (2011)
- World Mixed Doubles Championship: 1 (2017)
- Top CTRS ranking: 1st (2012–13)
- Grand Slam victories: 2 (2013 National, 2016 Champions Cup)
Medal record
Curling
Representing Canada
World Championships
Gold medal – first place	2011 Regina
World Mixed Doubles Championship
Silver medal – second place	2017 Lethbridge
Representing Manitoba
Tim Hortons Brier
Gold medal – first place	2011 London
Silver medal – second place	2013 Edmonton
Bronze medal – third place	2014 Kamloops
Canadian Mixed Doubles Championship
Gold medal – first place	2017 Saskatoon
Bronze medal – third place	2018 Leduc

Reid Carruthers (born December 30, 1984) is a retired Canadian curler from Winnipeg, Manitoba. Carruthers was the 2011 world champion—winning gold as a second on Jeff Stoughton's team—as well as an eight-time provincial champion, the 2003 junior provincial champion, and the 2008 Manitoba provincial mixed champion. He coaches the Kerri Einarson women's team.

== Career ==
As a junior curler, Carruthers skipped Manitoba at the 2003 Canadian Junior Curling Championships. He would lead the team to a 4-8 round robin record.

After juniors, he skipped a team with Jason Gunnlaugson, Derek Samagalski and Tyler Forrest to a provincial final against Jeff Stoughton in 2006. In 2008, he played in his first Brier, playing as the alternate for the Kerry Burtnyk rink, finishing in 5th place.

Carruthers joined the Stoughton rink as his second, in 2010. He won his first Manitoba provincial title playing for Stoughton at the 2011 Safeway Championship. Carruthers went on to win his first Tim Hortons Brier at the 2011 event in London. The Stoughton team defeated the Glenn Howard team 8 - 6 in the final. The team went on to represent Canada at the 2011 Ford World Men's Curling Championship, which they would eventually win after only losing one game throughout the competition. Carruthers won two more provincial championships with Stoughton, in 2013 (making the Brier final that year but losing to Brad Jacobs) and 2014 (finishing third at the Brier).

In 2014, the Stoughton rink went its separate ways, with Jeff soon retiring, and Carruthers formed his own team with Braeden Moskowy, Derek Samagalski and Colin Hodgson. The team would go on to win the 2015 Safeway Championship, earning the right to represent Manitoba at the 2015 Tim Hortons Brier. At the Brier, Carruthers led his team to a disappointing 4-7 finish.

Gaining confidence as a skip after his 2015 Brier appearance, and his years of success as a young front end player for Stoughton, Reid had a notable Grand Slam season in 2015-2016 reaching 3 finals, the quarters or better in 6 of 7 Grand Slam events, and winning his first Grand Slam event at the Champions Cup by defeating John Epping of Ontario in the final. He was, however, unable to defend his Manitoba title in 2016, losing in the semi-finals. In 2017, he advanced to the final by defeating arch Manitoba rival Mike McEwen in the 1–2, but in a finals rematch, he lost 8–7, losing out on a return to the Brier. That season was seen as successful by many, with a final, semi-final, and quarter-final in his first 4 Grand Slam events of the year. That season Carruthers would also win the 2016 Canada Cup of Curling.

Carruthers played in the 2017 Canadian Olympic Curling Trials, leading his team to a 4–4 record, missing the playoffs. Carruthers would finally win another Manitoba championship in 2018, defeating a chicken-pox ridden Mike McEwen in the final. At the 2018 Tim Hortons Brier, the team missed the playoffs, going 5–6. After the Brier, Moskowy left the team and was replaced by spares for the remainder of the season. In March 2018, it was announced McEwen would be joining the rink for the 2018-19 curling season, and will throw last rocks with Carruthers throwing third and skipping.

With McEwen joining the team, they found quick success finishing runner-up at the 2018 Elite 10 (September) to Brad Gushue. That was the only Slam they would qualified in, missing the playoffs at the other six events. They also missed the playoffs at the 2018 Canada Cup, going 0–6. They had a better tour season, winning the Stu Sells Toronto Tankard, Karuizawa International and the Ed Werenich Golden Wrench Classic. They also were successful at the 2019 Viterra Championship, defeating William Lyburn in the final. At the 2019 Tim Hortons Brier, Team Carruthers led Manitoba to a 6–5 record, just missing the playoffs. McEwen was officially named the teams skip for the 2019–20 season.

Team McEwen had a more successful following season. On the tour, they never missed the playoffs and they won one event, the inaugural WCT Uiseong International Curling Cup. In Grand Slam play, they reached the quarterfinals of the Tour Challenge and the National and the semifinals of the Canadian Open. They did not defend their provincial title, losing the final of the 2020 Viterra Championship to Jason Gunnlaugson. They still competed at the 2020 Tim Hortons Brier though, winning the Wild Card spot over Glenn Howard in the play-in game. Team McEwen finished the round robin and championship pool with a 7–4 record, which was a four-way tie for fourth. They faced John Epping in the first round of tiebreakers where they lost 8–5 and were eliminated. It would be the team's last event of the season as both the Players' Championship and the Champions Cup Grand Slam events were cancelled due to the COVID-19 pandemic.

In their lone tour event of the 2020–21 season, Team McEwen won the 2020 Ashley HomeStore Curling Classic. Due to the COVID-19 pandemic in Manitoba, the 2021 provincial championship was cancelled. As the reigning provincials champions, Team Jason Gunnlaugson was chosen to represent Manitoba at the 2021 Tim Hortons Brier. However, due to many provinces cancelling their provincial championships due to the COVID-19 pandemic in Canada, Curling Canada added three Wild Card teams to the national championship, which were based on the CTRS standings from the 2019–20 season. Because Team McEwen ranked 5th on the CTRS and kept at least three of their four players together for the 2020–21 season, they got the first Wild Card spot at the 2021 Brier in Calgary, Alberta. At the Brier, they finished with a 4–4 record, missing the championship pool.

For the 2023–24 curling season, Carruthers, Samagalski, and Njegovan would join with 2014 Olympic Gold medallist Brad Jacobs, with Jacobs skipping the team. The new Jacobs team had a strong showing at the 2024 Viterra Championship, winning the provincial championship, beating Braden Calvert 6–3 in the final. They would go on to represent Manitoba at the 2024 Montana's Brier, where they finished 7–1 in the round robin, qualifying for the playoff round. However, they lost against Gushue and Dunstone in the playoffs. At the end of the season, Jacobs announced he would be moving to Alberta to create a new team.

He played with the same team in the 2025–26 curling season, but he declined to attend the 2025 Olympic trials to focus on coaching Team Einarson. They failed to qualify for the 2026 Montana's Brier, in the provincial chiampionship as Braden Calvert's team won. In February 2026, he announced he was retiring from competitive curling.

== Personal life ==
Carruthers was born in Winnipeg, Manitoba. There, he attended Glenlawn Collegiate, the University of Winnipeg, and Red River College, studying kinesiology and industrial arts.

He is a former substitute teacher with the Louis Riel School Division. He has one child.

== Grand Slam record ==
Key
C	Champion
F	Lost in Final
SF	Lost in Semifinal
QF	Lost in Quarterfinals
R16	Lost in the round of 16
Q	Did not advance to playoffs
T2	Played in Tier 2 event
DNP	Did not participate in event
N/A	Not a Grand Slam event that season

Event	2007–08	2008–09	2009–10	2010–11	2011–12	2012–13	2013–14	2014–15	2015–16	2016–17	2017–18	2018–19	2019–20	2020–21	2021–22	2022–23	2023–24	2024–25	2025–26
Masters	Q	QF	DNP	F	QF	QF	SF	DNP	QF	SF	QF	Q	Q	N/A	Q	Q	QF	DNP	T2
Tour Challenge	N/A	N/A	N/A	N/A	N/A	N/A	N/A	N/A	QF	QF	Q	Q	QF	N/A	N/A	QF	QF	Q	Q
The National	Q	DNP	DNP	F	QF	C	Q	QF	F	F	QF	Q	QF	N/A	Q	Q	Q	Q	DNP
Canadian Open	DNP	Q	Q	SF	F	QF	SF	QF	SF	Q	QF	Q	SF	N/A	N/A	Q	Q	Q	T2
Players'	Q	DNP	Q	QF	Q	SF	Q	Q	Q	QF	Q	Q	N/A	SF	QF	Q	Q	DNP	DNP
Champions Cup	N/A	N/A	N/A	N/A	N/A	N/A	N/A	N/A	C	DNP	Q	Q	N/A	Q	DNP	Q	N/A	N/A	N/A
Elite 10	N/A	N/A	N/A	N/A	N/A	N/A	N/A	QF	F	SF	Q	F	N/A	N/A	N/A	N/A	N/A	N/A	N/A

== Teams ==
Season	Skip	Third	Second	Lead
2005–06	Reid Carruthers	Jason Gunnlaugson	Derek Samagalski	Tyler Forrest
2006–07	Reid Carruthers	Jason Gunnlaugson	Justin Richter	Tyler Forrest
2007–08	Reid Carruthers	Jason Gunnlaugson	Justin Richter	Tyler Forrest
2008–09	Reid Carruthers	Dan Kammerlock	Derek Samagalski	Shane Kilgallen
2009–10	Reid Carruthers	Chris Galbraith	Derek Samagalski	Shane Kilgallen
2010–11	Jeff Stoughton	Jon Mead	Reid Carruthers	Steve Gould
2011–12	Jeff Stoughton	Jon Mead	Reid Carruthers	Steve Gould
2012–13	Jeff Stoughton	Jon Mead	Reid Carruthers	Mark Nichols
2013–14	Jeff Stoughton	Jon Mead	Reid Carruthers	Mark Nichols
2013–14	Jeff Stoughton	Jon Mead	Mark Nichols	Reid Carruthers
2014–15	Reid Carruthers	Braeden Moskowy	Derek Samagalski	Colin Hodgson
2015–16	Reid Carruthers	Braeden Moskowy	Derek Samagalski	Colin Hodgson
2016–17	Reid Carruthers	Braeden Moskowy	Derek Samagalski	Colin Hodgson
2017–18	Reid Carruthers	Braeden Moskowy	Derek Samagalski	Colin Hodgson
2018–19	Mike McEwen (Fourth)	Reid Carruthers (Skip)	Derek Samagalski	Colin Hodgson
2019–20	Mike McEwen	Reid Carruthers	Derek Samagalski	Colin Hodgson
2020–21	Mike McEwen	Reid Carruthers	Derek Samagalski	Colin Hodgson
2021–22	Mike McEwen	Reid Carruthers	Derek Samagalski	Colin Hodgson
2022–23	Reid Carruthers	Jason Gunnlaugson (2022); Brad Jacobs (2023)	Derek Samagalski	Connor Njegovan
2023–24	Brad Jacobs	Reid Carruthers	Derek Samagalski	Connor Njegovan
2024–25	Reid Carruthers	Catlin Schneider; B. J. Neufeld (from Jan. 2025)	Derek Samagalski (until Nov. 2024); Kyle Doering (from Nov. 2024); Catlin Schneider	Connor Njegovan
2025–26	Reid Carruthers	B. J. Neufeld	Catlin Schneider	Connor Njegovan
