= Kelly Robertson =

Canadian curler

Kelly Robertson (born c. 1956) is a Canadian curler and grain and cattle farmer from Neepawa, Manitoba.

At the age of 54, Robertson won his biggest event in his career by winning the 2011 Canadian Senior Curling Championships in his first try. Until winning the 2011 Manitoba Senior provincial, Robertson had not even won a provincial title of any sort. His only national experience was filled in as skip for an absent Mike McEwen at the 2003 Canadian Mixed Curling Championship, where he finished with a 6-5 record.

Robertson finished the 2011 Canadian Senior Curling Championships round robin with a 10-1 record and went on to beat Alberta's Brad Hannah in the final. Kelly and his third Doug Armour were named to the All Star Team. Kelly and his team of Doug Armour, Peter Prokopowich and Bob Scales represented Canada at the 2012 World Senior Curling Championships in Tårnby, Denmark, where they won the silver medal.

Robertson and his team defended their Manitoba Provincial Senior Men's title again in 2012 and competed in the 2012 Canadian Senior Curling Championships in Abbotsford, BC.

Robertson made the final of the 2013 Senior Men's Provincial, again. This time, they lost the final to Bob Sigurdson 7-6. Robertson had beaten Sigurdson in the 1 vs. 1 Page playoff. In 2014, Robertson and his team of Doug Armour, Peter Prokopowich and Bob Scales defeated Bob Sigurdson in the Manitoba final 7-3. They represented Manitoba at the Canadian Senior Men's Curling Championship in Yellowknife, NWT where they lost the final 9-8 to O'Leary of NS. Kelly was named skip of the second All-Star Team.

At the 2014 Safeway Championship Men's Provincial Curling, Kelly along with Allan Lyburn, were named the inaugural recipients of The Pat Spiring Memorial Award. This award is presented annually to a Safeway Championship competitor who, in the opinion of his fellow competitors, exemplifies excellence combined with competitive spirit, love of the game, and respect for the spirit and traditions of curling. The recipient is voted on by the competitors. Kelly was again selected as the recipient in 2015.
