= Richard Daneault =

Canadian curler

- Curler
- Born: December 24, 1976 (age 49); Winnipeg, Manitoba

Team
- Curling club: Granite CC, Winnipeg, MB
- Skip: Martin Ferland
- Fourth: Richard Daneault
- Second: Don Bowser
- Lead: Vincent Bourget

Curling career
- Brier: 2 (2008, 2012)
- Top CTRS ranking: 4th (2007-08)
- Grand Slam victories: 0
Medal record
Men's Curling
Representing Manitoba
Tim Hortons Brier
Bronze medal – third place	2012 Saskatoon

Richard "Richie" Daneault (born December 24, 1976, in Winnipeg, Manitoba) is a Canadian curler who resides in Quebec City, Quebec.

== Career ==
Daneault first went to the brier in 2008 as a second on the Kerry Burtnyk team. Daneault's next major victory came when he won the 2012 Safeway Championship again as a second, but this time on the Rob Fowler team to represent Manitoba for the second time at the Tim Hortons Brier.
