= 2017 Newfoundland and Labrador Tankard =

- Host city: St. John's, Newfoundland and Labrador
- Arena: Bally Haly Golf & Curling Club
- Dates: January 26–29
- Winner: Brad Gushue
- Curling club: St. John's Curling Club & Bally Haly Golf & Curling Club, St. John's
- Skip: Brad Gushue
- Third: Mark Nichols
- Second: Brett Gallant
- Lead: Geoff Walker
- Finalist: Adam Boland

The 2017 Newfoundland and Labrador Men's Curling Championship (also known as the Tankard), the men's provincial curling championship for Newfoundland and Labrador, was held from January 26 to 29 at the Bally Haly Golf & Curling Club in St. John's, Newfoundland and Labrador. The winning team represented Newfoundland and Labrador at the 2017 Tim Hortons Brier from the Mile One Centre in St. John's. This will be the second time the winner will be the hosting provincial team in the history of the Brier.

The event was being held in conjunction with the 2017 Newfoundland and Labrador Scotties Tournament of Hearts, the women's provincial championship, which will be held at the same time.

== Teams ==
Teams are as follows:

| Skip | Vice | Second | Lead | Club |
|---|---|---|---|---|
| Adam Boland | Stephen Trickett | Zach Young | Evan Kearley | St. John's Curling Club, St. John's |
| Brad Gushue | Mark Nichols | Brett Gallant | Geoff Walker | St. John's Curling Club & Bally Haly Golf & Curling Club, St. John's |
| Paul Harvey | Steve Bragg | Andrew Manuel | Mike Day | St. John's Curling Club, St. John's |
| Trent Skanes | Nick Lane | Jeff Rose | Mike Mosher | St. John's Curling Club, St. John's |
| Colin Thomas | Cory Schuh | Chris Ford | Spencer Wicks | St. John's Curling Club, St. John's |

== Round robin standings ==
Key
| Teams to Final |

| Skip | W | L |
|---|---|---|
| Gushue | 4 | 0 |
| Boland | 3 | 1 |
| Harvey | 2 | 2 |
| Thomas | 1 | 3 |
| Skanes | 0 | 4 |

== Round robin results ==
=== January 26 ===
Draw 1

- Thomas 5-8 Harvey
- Gushue 7-2 Boland

Draw 2

- Thomas 3-10 Boland
- Skanes 1-7 Gushue

=== January 27 ===
Draw 3

- Harvey 6-7 Boland
- Skanes 8-10 Thomas

Draw 4

- Skanes 4-6 Harvey
- Gushue 9-3 Thomas

=== January 28 ===
Draw 5

- Skanes 4-6 Boland
- Harvey 4-8 Gushue

== Final ==
- Gushue must be beaten twice

Saturday, January 28, 7:30pm NST

| Team | 1 | 2 | 3 | 4 | 5 | 6 | 7 | 8 | 9 | 10 | Final |
|---|---|---|---|---|---|---|---|---|---|---|---|
| Brad Gushue | 1 | 2 | 0 | 1 | 0 | 1 | 0 | 0 | 1 | X | 6 |
| Adam Boland | 0 | 0 | 0 | 0 | 1 | 0 | 1 | 0 | 0 | X | 2 |

2017 Newfoundland and Labrador Tankard

Brad Gushue
14th Newfoundland and Labrador Provincial Championship title
