= 2015 Newfoundland and Labrador Tankard =

- Host city: Labrador City, Newfoundland and Labrador
- Arena: Carol Curling Club
- Dates: February 6–8
- Winner: Brad Gushue
- Curling club: Bally Haly G&CC, St. John's
- Skip: Brad Gushue
- Third: Mark Nichols
- Second: Brett Gallant
- Lead: Geoff Walker
- Finalist: Gary Wensman

The 2015 Newfoundland and Labrador Tankard, the provincial men's curling championship of Newfoundland and Labrador, was held from February 6 to 8 at the Carol Curling Club in Labrador City. The winning Brad Gushue rink represented Newfoundland and Labrador at the 2015 Tim Hortons Brier in Calgary.

== Teams ==
Due to the cost of flying from Newfoundland to Labrador and the skill level of the perennial provincial champion Brad Gushue rink, only two teams entered the competition: Gushue and a local Labrador City team, the Gary Wensman rink.

Skip	Third	Second	Lead	Club(s)
Brad Gushue	Mark Nichols	Brett Gallant	Geoff Walker	Bally Haly Golf & Curling Club, St. John's
Gary Wensman	Mike Ryan	Mike Brown	Corey Hennessey	Carol Curling Club, Labrador City

== Results ==
Gushue and Wensman played a best of five series.

=== Draw 1 ===
Friday, February 6, 2:30 pm

Team	1	2	3	4	5	6	7	8	9	10	Final
Brad Gushue	2	2	3	2	0	1	X	X	X	X	10
Gary Wensman	0	0	0	0	1	0	X	X	X	X	1

=== Draw 2 ===
Friday, February 6, 7:30 pm

Team	1	2	3	4	5	6	7	8	9	10	Final
Brad Gushue	2	0	0	2	0	2	2	0	1	X	9
Gary Wensman	0	2	0	0	1	0	0	1	0	X	4

=== Draw 3 ===
Saturday, February 7, 9:30 am

Team	1	2	3	4	5	6	7	8	9	10	Final
Brad Gushue	1	0	0	2	0	2	1	2	0	X	8
Gary Wensman	0	1	2	0	2	0	0	0	1	X	6

2015 Newfoundland and Labrador Tankard

Brad Gushue
12th Newfoundland and Labrador Provincial Championship title
