= 2016 Newfoundland and Labrador Tankard =

- Host city: St. John's, Newfoundland and Labrador
- Arena: Re/Max Centre
- Dates: January 28–31
- Winner: Brad Gushue
- Curling club: Bally Haly Golf & Curling Club, St. John's
- Skip: Brad Gushue
- Third: Mark Nichols
- Second: Brett Gallant
- Lead: Geoff Walker
- Finalist: Colin Thomas

The 2016 Newfoundland and Labrador Men's Curling Championship (also known as the Tankard), the men's provincial curling championship for Newfoundland and Labrador, was held from January 28 to 31 at the Re/Max Centre (the St. John's Curling Club) in St. John's, Newfoundland and Labrador. The winning Brad Gushue team represented Newfoundland and Labrador at the 2016 Tim Hortons Brier in Ottawa.

== Teams ==
Teams are as follows:

Skip	Vice	Second	Lead	Club
Adam Boland	Ross Young	Zach Young	Andrew Taylor	St. John's Curling Club, St. John's
Brad Gushue	Mark Nichols	Brett Gallant	Geoff Walker	Bally Haly Golf & Curling Club, St. John's
Matthew Hunt	Mark Fajertag	Evan Kearley	Andrew Taylor	St. John's Curling Club, St. John's
Rick Rowsell	David Noftall	Craig Dowden	Ken Peddigrew	St. John's Curling Club, St. John's
Andrew Symonds	Mark Healy	Cory Ewart	Keith Jewer	St. John's Curling Club, St. John's
Colin Thomas	Cory Schuh	Chris Ford	Spencer Wicks	St. John's Curling Club, St. John's

== Round-robin standings ==
Key
Teams to Final
Teams to Tiebreakers

Skip	W	L
Gushue	5	0
Thomas	3	2
Rowsell	3	2
Symonds	3	2
Hunt	1	4
Boland	0	5

== Round-robin results ==
=== January 28 ===
Draw 1

- Thomas 7-6 Hunt
- Gushue 9-2 Boland
- Symonds 6-3 Rowsell

Draw 2

- Rowsell 8-5 Boland
- Thomas 8-2 Symonds
- Gushue 11-1 Hunt

=== January 29 ===
Draw 3

- Gushue 9-4 Symonds
- Hunt 6-5 Boland
- Rowsell 6-4 Thomas

Draw 4

- Gushue 8-1 Rowsell
- Symonds 9-4 Hunt
- Thomas 8-3 Boland

=== January 30 ===
Draw 5

- Rowsell 11-5 Hunt
- Symonds 8-3 Boland
- Gushue 8-5 Thomas

==== Tiebreakers ====
- Rowsell 9-8 Symonds
- Thomas 6-4 Rowsell

== Final ==
- Gushue must be beaten twice

Sunday, January 31, 10:00 am

Team	1	2	3	4	5	6	7	8	9	10	Final
Brad Gushue	0	2	1	0	1	2	2	X	X	X	8
Colin Thomas	0	0	0	1	0	0	0	X	X	X	1

2016 Newfoundland and Labrador Tankard

Brad Gushue
13th Newfoundland and Labrador Provincial Championship title
