= Newfoundland and Labrador Tankard =

- Established: 1951
- 2026 host city: St. John's, Newfoundland and Labrador
- 2026 arena: RE/MAX Centre
- 2026 champion: Nathan Young

Current edition
- 2026 Newfoundland and Labrador Tankard

The Newfoundland and Labrador Tankard is the Newfoundland and Labrador provincial championship for men's curling. The tournament is run by the Newfoundland and Labrador Curling Association. The winner represents Team Newfoundland and Labrador at the Brier, Canada's national men's curling championship.

== Champions ==
(National champions in bold)

Year	Team	Curling club
2026	Nathan Young, Colin Thomas, Nathan Locke, Ben Stringer	St. John's Curling Club
2025	Ty Dilello, Ryan McNeil Lamswood, Daniel Bruce, Aaron Feltham	St. John's Curling Club
2024	Andrew Symonds, Colin Thomas, Stephen Trickett, Alex Smith	St. John's Curling Club
2023	Nathan Young, Sam Follett, Nathan Locke, Ben Stringer	St. John's Curling Club
2022	Nathan Young, Sam Follett, Nathan Locke, Ben Stringer	St. John's Curling Club
2021	Greg Smith, Greg Blyde, Alex McDonah, Evan McDonah	St. John's Curling Club
**2020**	**Brad Gushue, Mark Nichols, Brett Gallant, Geoff Walker**	**St. John's Curling Club**
2019	Andrew Symonds, Chris Ford, Adam Boland, Keith Jewer	St. John's Curling Club
2018	Greg Smith, Matthew Hunt, Andrew Taylor, Ian Withycombe	St. John's Curling Club
**2017**	**Brad Gushue, Mark Nichols, Brett Gallant, Geoff Walker**	**Bally Haly Golf and Curling Club / St. John's Curling Club**
2016	Brad Gushue, Mark Nichols, Brett Gallant, Geoff Walker	Bally Haly Golf and Curling Club / St. John's Curling Club
2015	Brad Gushue, Mark Nichols, Brett Gallant, Geoff Walker	Bally Haly Golf and Curling Club / St. John's Curling Club
2014	Brad Gushue, Brett Gallant, Adam Casey, Geoff Walker	Bally Haly Golf and Curling Club
2013	Brad Gushue, Adam Casey, Brett Gallant, Geoff Walker	Bally Haly Golf and Curling Club
2012	Brad Gushue, Ryan Fry, Adam Casey, Geoff Walker	Bally Haly Golf and Curling Club
2011	Brad Gushue, Mark Nichols, Ryan Fry, Jamie Danbrook	Bally Haly Golf and Curling Club
2010	Brad Gushue, Mark Nichols, Ryan Fry, Jamie Korab	Bally Haly Golf and Curling Club
2009	Brad Gushue, Mark Nichols, Ryan Fry, Jamie Korab	Bally Haly Golf and Curling Club
2008	Brad Gushue, Mark Nichols, Chris Schille, Dave Noftall	Bally Haly Golf and Curling Club
2007	Brad Gushue, Mark Nichols, Chris Schille, Jamie Korab	Corner Brook Curling Club
2006	Ken Peddigrew, Ryan LeDrew, Jeff Rose, Keith Jewer	St. John's Curling Club
2005	Brad Gushue, Mark Nichols, Keith Ryan, Jamie Korab	St. John's Curling Club
2004	Brad Gushue, Mark Nichols, Jamie Korab, Mark Ward	Bally Haly Golf and Curling Club
2003	Brad Gushue, Mark Nichols, Jamie Korab, Mark Ward	St. John's Curling Club
2002	Mark Noseworthy, Bill Jenkins, Randy Turpin, Ian Kerr	St. John's Curling Club
2001	Keith Ryan, Garry Pinsent, Mike Ryan, Dennis Langdon	Carol Curling Club
2000	Rick Rowsell, Peter Hollett, Ken Ellis Jr., Craig Dowden	St. John's Curling Club
1999	Glenn Goss, Glenn Turpin, Ken Peddigrew, Brett Reynolds	St. John's Curling Club
1998	Toby McDonald, Wayne Hamilton, Lloyd Powell, Paul Withers	Bally Haly Golf and Curling Club
1997	Jeff Thomas, Lorne Henderson, Ken Ellis Jr., Ian Kerr	St. John's Curling Club
1996	Frank O'Driscoll, Rick Rowsell, Peter Hollett, Craig Dowden	St. John's Curling Club
1995	Bill Jenkins, Joe Power, Paul Harvey, Ken Peddigrew	St. John's Curling Club
1994	Mark Noseworthy, Frank O'Driscoll, Rob Thomas, Eugene Trickett	St. John's Curling Club
1993	Gary Oke, Don Ryan, Rob Thomas, Gary Rowe	Recplex
1992	Glenn Goss, Geoff Cunningham, John Allan, Neil Young	St. John's Curling Club
1991	John Boland, Phil Kieley, Bob Skanes, Dave Mayne	Gander Curling Club
1990	Glenn Goss, Geoff Cunningham, John Allan, Neil Young	St. John's Curling Club
1989	Lorne Henderson, Alex Smith, Peter Hollett, Marc Brophy	St. John's Curling Club
1988	Gary Oke, Ken Thomas, Marc Brophy, Gerry Collins	Recplex
1987	Mark Noseworthy, Randy Perry, Eugene Trickett, Rob Thomas	St. John's Curling Club
1986	Fred Durant, Chris Hamelmann, Blake Fizzard, Dave Warren	St. John's Curling Club
1985	Jeff Thomas, Geoff Cunningham, John Allan, Neil Young	St. John's Curling Club
1984	Jeff Thomas, Geoff Cunningham, John Allan, Neil Young	St. John's Curling Club
1983	Gary Oke, Don Ryan, Darrell Martin, Kevin Mitchell	Corner Brook Curling Club
1982	Mark Noseworthy, Randy Perry, Eugene Trickett, John Wheeler	St. John's Curling Club
1981	Toby McDonald, Jim Miller, John Allan, Neil Young	St. John's Curling Club
1980	Wayne Hamilton, Lewis Andrews, Paul Hamilton, Colin Janes	St. John's Curling Club
1979	Jeff Thomas, Toby McDonald, Peter Hollett, Ken Thomas	St. John's Curling Club
1978	Bob Rowe, Tom Melnyk, Tony Pilling, Charles Fennimore	Goose Bay Curling Club
1977	Wayne Hamilton, Joe Power Jr., Ken Thomas, Paul Hamilton	St. John's Curling Club
**1976**	**Jack MacDuff, Toby McDonald, Doug Hudson, Ken Templeton**	**St. John's Curling Club**
1975	Bob Cole, Joe Power, Lewis Andrews, Andy Baird	St. John's Curling Club
1974	Fred Wight, Damien Ryan, Doug Hudson, Keith Wight	St. John's Curling Club
1973	Jim Ward, Mike Brennan, Dick Narduzzi, Jim Noble	Carol Curling Club
1972	Fred Durant, Jack MacDuff, Bob Rowe, Carl Strong	St. John's Curling Club
1971	Bob Cole, Les Bowering, Ken Ellis, Alex Andrews	St. John's Curling Club
1970	Les Bowering, Frank Stent, Dan Herder, Roger Mabey	St. John's Curling Club
1969	Bill Piercey, Keith Lawes, Ken Ellis, Alex Andrews	St. John's Curling Club
1968	Bill Piercey, Frank Stent, Tom Warren, Bill Roy	St. John's Curling Club
1967	Leonard Kalchak, Doug Ellis, John Strugnel, Duane Olsen	RCAF Goose Bay Curling Club
1966	George MacCharles, Jack Taite, Ken Ellis, Alex Andrews	St. John's Curling Club
1965	George MacCharles, Jack Taite, Ken Ellis, Alex Andrews	St. John's Curling Club
1964	Ed Pedley, George Giannou, Jack Taite, Bill O'Reilly	St. John's Curling Club
1963	John Pike, Roy Baker, Denny Goodyear, Ron Hovey	Grand Falls Curling Club
1962	George Giannou, Fred Colbourne, George MacCharles, Jack Taite	St. John's Curling Club
1961	Alexander Fisher, Frank Stent, Sam Wiseman, Tom Moulton	Blomidon Curling Club
1960	John-David Lyon, Harry Stanley, Reg Goldburg, Jim Tulley	Goose Bay Curling Club
1959	Alexander Fisher, Bill Howell, John Gullage, Bill Piercey	Blomidon Curling Club
1958	Alexander Fisher, Bill Howell, John Gullage, Bill Piercey	Corner Brook Curling Club
1957	Alexander Fisher, Bill Howell, John Gullage, Bill Piercey	Corner Brook Curling Club
1956	Bob Goudey, Wes Hermanson, Norm Pounder, George Giannou	St. John's Curling Club
1955	Norm Rockwell, Len Oliver, Norm Pounder, Carm Rockwell	St. John's Curling Club
1954	Bob Kent, Jack Norris, Gordon Stirling, Gerry Hanley	St. John's Curling Club
1953	Norm Rockwell, Lewis Ayre, Johnny Stoneman, Bill Howell	St. John's Curling Club
1952	Tommy Tomelin, Norm Hood, Alexander Fisher, Austin Boyd	Corner Brook Curling Club
1951	Tom Hallett, Claude Hall, Fred Wylie, Ed Hiscock	St. John's Curling Club

== Other Newfoundland and Labrador teams at the Brier ==
Beginning in 2015, the defending Brier champion automatically earned a berth for the following years' national championship as "Team Canada". A Wildcard entry was added in 2018, which was expanded to three entries in 2021. Two of these entries became prequalifying entries in 2024.

Brier	Team name	Team	Club
2018	Team Canada	Brad Gushue, Mark Nichols, Brett Gallant, Geoff Walker	Bally Haly / St. John's
2019	Team Canada	Brad Gushue, Mark Nichols, Brett Gallant, Geoff Walker	Bally Haly / St. John's
2021	Team Canada	Brad Gushue, Mark Nichols, Brett Gallant, Geoff Walker	St. John's
2022	Wild Card #1	Brad Gushue, Mark Nichols, Brett Gallant, Geoff Walker	St. John's
2023	Team Canada	Brad Gushue, Mark Nichols, E. J. Harnden, Geoff Walker	St. John's
2024	Team Canada	Brad Gushue, Mark Nichols, E. J. Harnden, Geoff Walker	St. John's
2025	Team Canada	Brad Gushue, Mark Nichols, Brendan Bottcher, Geoff Walker	St. John's
