= 2010 Newfoundland and Labrador Tankard =

- Host city: St. John's
- Arena: Bally Haly Golf & Curling Club
- Dates: February 2–7
- Winner: Brad Gushue
- Curling club: Bally Haly G&CC, St. John's
- Skip: Brad Gushue
- Third: Mark Nichols
- Second: Ryan Fry
- Lead: Jamie Korab
- Finalist: Alex Smith

The 2010 Newfoundland and Labrador Tankard was the 2010 edition of the Newfoundland and Labrador Provincial Men's Curling Championship. It was held February 2–7 at the Bally Haly Golf & Curling Club in St. John's, Newfoundland and Labrador.

== Teams ==
Skip	Third	Second	Lead	Curling club
Matt Blandford	Trent Skanes	Jamie Danbrook	Brad MacInnes	St. John's Curling Club, St. John's
Dean Branton	Paul Steves	Gary Perry	Mike Murphy	Bally Haly Golf and Curling Club, St. John's
Brad Gushue	Mark Nichols	Ryan Fry	Jamie Korab	Bally Haly Golf and Curling Club, St. John's
Ken Peddigrew	Dave Noftall	Jeff Rose	Keith Jewer	Bally Haly Golf and Curling Club, St. John's
Keith Ryan	Barry Edwards	Mike Ryan	Dennis Langdon	Carol Curling Club, Labrador City
Alex Smith	Rick Rowsell	Randy Turpin	Craig Dowden	Bally Haly Golf and Curling Club, St. John's
Jeff Staples	Brian Mercer	Gary Furlong	Laurie Whidden	Carol Curling Club, Labrador City
Andrew Symonds	Ryan LeDrew	Mark Healy	Peter Hollett	St. John's Curling Club, St. John's
John Wheeler	Wilf Parsons	Roy Hodder	Carl Hynes	St. John's Curling Club, St. John's

== Standings ==
Skip	W	L
Gushue	7	1
Smith	6	2
Blandford	5	3
Symonds	5	3
Peddigrew	4	4
Ryan	4	4
Branton	2	6
Wheeler	2	6
Staples	1	7

== Results ==
=== February 2 ===
- Ryan 10-4 Symonds
- Branton 8-6 Staples (11)
- Peddigrew 6-3 Smith
- Gushue 7-3 Wheeler
- Gushue 8-4 Branton
- Blandford 8-4 Peddigrew
- Symonds 6-3 Wheeler
- Smith 7-5 Ryan

=== February 3 ===
- Blandford 9-3 Wheeler
- Smith 9-1 Symonds
- Peddigrew 7-6 Ryan
- Gushue 8-4 Staples
- Gushue 9-2 Ryan
- Blandford 7-4 Branton
- Wheeler 7-6 Staples
- Symonds 8-7 Peddigrew (11)

=== February 4 ===
- Smith 7-3 Staples
- Wheeler 7-5 Peddigrew
- Blandford 8-7 Gushue (11)
- Ryan 9-4 Branton
- Ryan 7-2 Wheeler
- Gushue 8-5 Symonds
- Smith 5-1 Branton
- Staples 6-5 Blandford

=== February 5 ===
- Peddigrew 10-3 Staples
- Smith 8-4 Wheeler
- Blandford 6-4 Ryan
- Symonds 8-3 Branton
- Branton 5-3 Wheeler
- Gushue 7-1 Peddigrew
- Symonds 9-2 Staples
- Smith 9-7 Blandford

=== February 6 ===
- Symonds 9-5 Blandford
- Ryan 8-3 Staples
- Gushue 6-1 Smith
- Peddigrew 4-1 Branton

=== Tie breaker ===
- Symonds 9-3 Blandford

== Playoffs ==
Semifinal			Final
			1	Brad Gushue	8
2	Alex Smith	10	3	Alex Smith	2
3	Andrew Symonds	5

=== Semi-final ===
February 7,

Team	1	2	3	4	5	6	7	8	9	10	Final
Andrew Symonds	0	1	0	1	1	0	0	2	0	X	5
Alex Smith	0	0	3	0	0	2	2	0	3	X	10

=== Final ===
February 7

Team	1	2	3	4	5	6	7	8	9	10	Final
Alex Smith	0	1	0	0	1	0	X	X	X	X	2
Brad Gushue	2	0	2	1	0	3	X	X	X	X	8
