= 2014 Newfoundland and Labrador Tankard =

- Host city: St. John's, Newfoundland and Labrador
- Arena: Bally Haly Golf & Curling Club
- Dates: January 29–February 2
- Winner: Brad Gushue
- Curling club: Bally Haly Golf & Curling Club
- Skip: Brad Gushue
- Third: Brett Gallant
- Second: Adam Casey
- Lead: Geoff Walker
- Finalist: Colin Thomas

The 2014 Newfoundland and Labrador Tankard, the men's provincial curling championship for Newfoundland and Labrador, was held from January 29 to February 2 at the Bally Haly Golf & Curling Club in St. John's, Newfoundland and Labrador. The winning team, skipped by Brad Gushue, represented Newfoundland and Labrador at the 2014 Tim Hortons Brier in Kamloops, British Columbia.

== Teams ==
Skip	Vice	Second	Lead	Club
Brad Gushue	Brett Gallant	Adam Casey	Geoff Walker	Bally Haly Golf & Curling Club, St. John's
Ken Peddigrew	David Noftall	Jeff Rose	Keith Jewer	St. John's Curling Club, St. John's
Rick Rowsell	Craig Dowden	John Sheppard	Matthew Hanlon	St. John's Curling Club, St. John's
Trent Skanes	Nick Lane	Steve Bragg	Mike Mosher	Bally Haly Golf & Curling Club, St. John's
Andrew Symonds	Mark Healy	Steve Ryan	Cory Ewart	St. John's Curling Club, St. John's
Colin Thomas	Cory Schuh	Chris Ford	Spencer Wicks	St. John's Curling Club, St. John's

== Round-robin standings ==
Final round-robin standings

Key
Teams to Playoffs
Teams to Tiebreakers

Skip (Club)	W	L	PF	PA
Brad Gushue (Bally Haly)	5	0	41	17
Colin Thomas (St. John's)	3	2	33	19
Ken Peddigrew (St. John's)	3	2	28	34
Trent Skanes (Bally Haly)	3	2	27	26
Andrew Symonds (St. John's)	1	4	39	34
Rick Rowsell (St. John's)	0	5	14	42

== Round-robin results ==
All draw times are listed in Newfoundland Standard Time (UTC−3:30).

=== Draw 1 ===
Wednesday, January 29, 7:30 pm

Team	1	2	3	4	5	6	7	8	9	10	11	Final
Rick Rowsell	1	0	1	2	0	0	2	0	0	0	0	6
Ken Peddigrew	0	0	0	0	1	2	0	1	1	1	1	7

Team	1	2	3	4	5	6	7	8	9	10	Final
Colin Thomas	0	1	0	0	0	0	2	0	0	X	3
Trent Skanes	0	0	2	0	1	2	0	0	1	X	6

Team	1	2	3	4	5	6	7	8	9	10	Final
Andrew Symonds	0	1	0	0	1	0	0	X	X	X	2
Brad Gushue	2	0	2	1	0	3	1	X	X	X	9

=== Draw 2 ===
Thursday, January 30, 2:00 pm

Team	1	2	3	4	5	6	7	8	9	10	Final
Andrew Symonds	1	0	0	1	0	1	0	0	2	0	5
Trent Skanes	0	2	0	0	1	0	0	1	0	2	6

Team	1	2	3	4	5	6	7	8	9	10	Final
Colin Thomas	0	0	4	3	1	X	X	X	X	X	8
Ken Peddigrew	0	0	0	0	0	X	X	X	X	X	0

Team	1	2	3	4	5	6	7	8	9	10	Final
Rick Rowsell	1	0	2	0	0	0	0	1	X	X	4
Brad Gushue	0	3	0	3	2	0	0	0	X	X	8

=== Draw 3 ===
Thursday, January 30, 7:30 pm

Team	1	2	3	4	5	6	7	8	9	10	Final
Brad Gushue	0	2	1	0	1	0	2	1	1	X	8
Colin Thomas	1	0	0	2	0	1	0	0	0	X	4

Team	1	2	3	4	5	6	7	8	9	10	Final
Andrew Symonds	1	0	3	2	0	4	X	X	X	X	10
Rick Rowsell	0	1	0	0	1	0	X	X	X	X	2

Team	1	2	3	4	5	6	7	8	9	10	Final
Trent Skanes	0	0	0	0	2	0	2	0	1	X	5
Ken Peddigrew	1	3	1	1	0	1	0	1	0	X	8

=== Draw 4 ===
Friday, January 31, 2:30 pm

Team	1	2	3	4	5	6	7	8	9	10	Final
Trent Skanes	0	0	0	1	1	0	0	0	X	X	2
Brad Gushue	2	1	3	0	0	0	2	1	X	X	9

Team	1	2	3	4	5	6	7	8	9	10	Final
Andrew Symonds	0	1	0	1	0	2	0	0	2	1	7
Ken Peddigrew	2	0	2	0	1	0	0	3	0	0	8

Team	1	2	3	4	5	6	7	8	9	10	Final
Colin Thomas	0	1	3	1	0	4	X	X	X	X	9
Rick Rowsell	0	0	0	0	1	0	X	X	X	X	1

=== Draw 5 ===
Friday, January 31, 8:00 pm

Team	1	2	3	4	5	6	7	8	9	10	Final
Rick Rowsell	0	0	0	1	0	X	X	X	X	X	1
Trent Skanes	2	2	2	0	2	X	X	X	X	X	8

Team	1	2	3	4	5	6	7	8	9	10	Final
Colin Thomas	1	0	0	1	0	0	2	0	5	X	9
Andrew Symonds	0	0	1	0	2	1	0	1	0	X	5

Team	1	2	3	4	5	6	7	8	9	10	Final
Brad Gushue	2	0	0	0	2	0	0	2	0	1	7
Ken Peddigrew	0	0	1	1	0	1	1	0	1	0	5

== Tiebreakers ==
Saturday, February 1, 9:00 am

Team	1	2	3	4	5	6	7	8	9	10	11	Final
Trent Skanes	0	0	0	1	1	0	1	0	1	0	1	5
Ken Peddigrew	0	0	0	0	0	2	0	1	0	1	0	4

Saturday, February 1, 2:00 pm

Team	1	2	3	4	5	6	7	8	9	10	Final
Colin Thomas	1	0	0	2	4	0	1	0	0	X	8
Trent Skanes	0	0	2	0	0	1	0	1	0	X	4

== Final ==
Saturday, February 1, 7:30 pm

Team	1	2	3	4	5	6	7	8	9	10	Final
Brad Gushue	0	1	0	0	5	0	X	X	X	X	6
Colin Thomas	0	0	0	1	0	1	X	X	X	X	2

2014 Newfoundland and Labrador Tankard

Brad Gushue
11th Newfoundland and Labrador Provincial Championship title
