= 2009 Newfoundland and Labrador Provincial Men's Curling Championship =

- Host city: Stephenville
- Arena: Caribou Curling Club
- Dates: February 3–8
- Winner: Brad Gushue
- Curling club: Bally Haly G&CC, St. John's
- Skip: Brad Gushue
- Third: Mark Nichols
- Second: Ryan Fry
- Lead: Jamie Korab
- Finalist: Keith Ryan

The 2009 Newfoundland and Labrador Provincial Men's Curling Championship (Newfoundland and Labrador's men's provincial curling championship) was held from February 3–8 at the Caribou Curling Club in Stephenville, Newfoundland and Labrador. The winning team (skipped by Brad Gushue) represented Newfoundland and Labrador at the 2009 Tim Hortons Brier in Calgary.

== Teams ==
Skip	Vice	Second	Lead	Alternate	Club
Dean Branton	Matthew Blandford	Andrew Mercer	Mike Murphy		The ReMax Centre, St. John's
Bas Buckle	Brian Bailey	Ken Thomas	Gary Alcock		Corner Brook Curling Club, Corner Brook
Geoff Cunningham	Rob Thomas	Gary Tiller	Steve Bragg		The ReMax Centre, St. John's
Brad Gushue	Mark Nichols	Ryan Fry	Jamie Korab		Bally Haly Golf & Curling Club, St. John's
Gary Oke	Bob Skanes	Terry Oke	Jim Goodyear		Corner Brook Curling Club, Corner Brook
Ken Peddigrew	Dave Noftall	Jeff Rose	Keith Jewer		The ReMax Centre, St. John's
Rick Rowsell	Trent Skanes	Craig Dowden	Paul Steeves		The ReMax Centre, St. John's
Keith Ryan	Barry Edwards	Mike Ryan	Dennis Langdon	Corey Hennessey	Carol Curling Club, Labrador City
Alex Smith	Andrew Symonds	Mark Healy	Peter Hollett		The ReMax Centre, St. John's
Jeff Staples	Barry McLean	Brian Mercer	Bill Biggin		Carol Curling Club, Labrador City

== Standings ==
Skip (Club)	W	L
Brad Gushue (Bally Haly)	9	0
Gary Oke (Corner Brook)	7	2
Keith Ryan (Carol)	5	4
Alex Smith (ReMax)	5	4
Rick Rowsell (ReMax)	5	4
Ken Peddigrew (ReMax)	3	6
Geoff Cunningham (ReMax)	3	6
Jeff Staples (Carol)	3	6
Dean Branton (ReMax)	3	6
Bas Buckle (Corner Brook)	2	7

== Results ==
=== Draw 1 ===
February 3, 1430

Sheet A	1	2	3	4	5	6	7	8	9	10	11	Final
Bas Buckle	0	0	1	0	0	1	0	1	0	3	0	6
Alex Smith	0	1	0	2	0	0	2	0	1	0	1	7

Sheet B	1	2	3	4	5	6	7	8	9	10	Final
Rick Rowsell	0	0	0	0	1	0	0	1	0	X	2
Brad Gushue	2	1	1	0	0	2	0	0	0	X	6

Sheet C	1	2	3	4	5	6	7	8	9	10	Final
Ken Peddigrew	0	0	1	0	1	0	2	0	1	0	5
Dean Branton	0	2	0	1	0	2	0	1	0	1	7

Sheet D	1	2	3	4	5	6	7	8	9	10	Final
Jeff Staples	0	1	0	0	2	0	0	0	2	2	7
Geoff Cunningham	2	0	0	1	0	1	1	3	0	0	8

=== Draw 2 ===
February 3, 2000

Sheet A	1	2	3	4	5	6	7	8	9	10	Final
Keith Ryan	0	2	0	2	0	0	1	2	0	1	8
Rick Rowsell	1	0	2	0	1	0	0	0	1	0	5

Sheet B	1	2	3	4	5	6	7	8	9	10	11	Final
Jeff Staples	1	0	0	1	0	1	1	0	1	0	1	6
Bas Buckle	0	1	0	0	2	0	0	1	0	1	0	5

Sheet C	1	2	3	4	5	6	7	8	9	10	Final
Geoff Cunningham	0	1	0	0	2	1	0	1	0	X	5
Alex Smith	2	0	2	1	0	0	3	0	2	X	10

Sheet D	1	2	3	4	5	6	7	8	9	10	Final
Gary Oke	0	0	1	0	0	0	2	1	2	2	8
Dean Branton	0	0	0	2	1	1	0	0	0	0	4

=== Draw 3 ===
February 4, 0930

Sheet A	1	2	3	4	5	6	7	8	9	10	Final
Ken Peddigrew	0	0	2	0	1	0	0	2	0	0	5
Gary Oke	0	1	0	1	0	1	2	0	1	1	7

Sheet B	1	2	3	4	5	6	7	8	9	10	Final
Alex Smith	0	0	0	0	2	0	2	3	0	X	7
Jeff Staples	0	1	1	1	0	1	0	0	1	X	5

Sheet C	1	2	3	4	5	6	7	8	9	10	Final
Brad Gushue	0	0	1	1	2	0	1	0	0	1	6
Keith Ryan	0	2	0	0	0	1	0	2	0	0	5

=== Draw 4 ===
February 4, 1430

Sheet A	1	2	3	4	5	6	7	8	9	10	Final
Dean Branton	0	0	3	0	0	0	0	2	0	X	5
Alex Smith	1	1	0	1	1	2	1	0	0	X	7

Sheet B	1	2	3	4	5	6	7	8	9	10	11	Final
Ken Peddigrew	0	1	0	0	1	0	1	0	0	1	1	5
Geoff Cunningham	0	0	2	0	0	1	0	1	0	0	0	4

Sheet C	1	2	3	4	5	6	7	8	9	10	Final
Rick Rowsell	1	0	3	0	2	0	1	0	0	1	8
Jeff Staples	0	1	0	2	0	2	0	1	1	0	7

Sheet D	1	2	3	4	5	6	7	8	9	10	Final
Bas Buckle	0	2	0	1	0	2	0	2	0	0	7
Brad Gushue	3	0	2	0	1	0	2	0	0	1	9

=== Draw 5 ===
February 4, 2000

Sheet A	1	2	3	4	5	6	7	8	9	10	Final
Brad Gushue	1	1	1	0	2	0	1	1	0	X	7
Jeff Staples	0	0	0	1	0	1	0	0	1	X	3

Sheet B	1	2	3	4	5	6	7	8	9	10	Final
Gary Oke	0	0	0	0	2	0	0	2	0	2	6
Rick Rowsell	1	0	0	0	0	2	1	0	1	0	5

Sheet C	1	2	3	4	5	6	7	8	9	10	Final
Alex Smith	0	1	1	0	1	0	2	1	0	0	6
Ken Peddigrew	2	0	0	2	0	1	0	0	1	2	8

Sheet D	1	2	3	4	5	6	7	8	9	10	Final
Dean Branton	0	0	0	0	1	0	0	X	X	X	1
Keith Ryan	0	1	3	1	0	1	1	X	X	X	7

=== Draw 6 ===
February 5, 0930

Sheet A	1	2	3	4	5	6	7	8	9	10	Final
Rick Rowsell	0	0	0	0	2	2	3	0	2	X	9
Geoff Cunningham	0	2	0	2	0	0	0	2	0	X	6

Sheet B	1	2	3	4	5	6	7	8	9	10	Final
Bas Buckle	0	1	3	0	0	1	1	0	1	0	7
Dean Branton	1	0	0	1	1	0	0	2	0	1	6

Sheet D	1	2	3	4	5	6	7	8	9	10	Final
Keith Ryan	0	0	0	0	0	1	2	2	1	X	6
Gary Oke	0	0	0	2	0	0	0	0	0	X	2

=== Draw 7 ===
February 5, 1430

Sheet A	1	2	3	4	5	6	7	8	9	10	Final
Ken Peddigrew	0	2	0	0	0	1	0	3	0	X	6
Bas Buckle	1	0	1	1	3	0	2	0	2	X	10

Sheet B	1	2	3	4	5	6	7	8	9	10	11	Final
Alex Smith	1	0	0	1	0	1	0	1	0	2	0	6
Gary Oke	0	1	1	0	2	0	1	0	1	0	1	7

Sheet C	1	2	3	4	5	6	7	8	9	10	Final
Keith Ryan	0	0	0	0	0	1	1	1	1	X	4
Jeff Staples	0	1	1	1	4	0	0	0	0	X	7

Sheet D	1	2	3	4	5	6	7	8	9	10	Final
Brad Gushue	0	0	0	2	0	0	3	0	2	X	7
Geoff Cunningham	1	0	0	0	2	1	0	1	0	X	5

=== Draw 8 ===
February 5, 2000

Sheet A	1	2	3	4	5	6	7	8	9	10	Final
Dean Branton	0	0	3	0	1	1	0	3	0	X	8
Brad Gushue	0	2	0	2	0	0	2	0	4	X	10

Sheet B	1	2	3	4	5	6	7	8	9	10	11	Final
Geoff Cunningham	0	2	0	0	0	1	1	0	0	1	1	6
Keith Ryan	1	0	1	1	1	0	0	1	0	0	0	5

Sheet C	1	2	3	4	5	6	7	8	9	10	Final
Bas Buckle	0	0	0	1	0	X	X	X	X	X	1
Gary Oke	2	3	1	0	1	X	X	X	X	X	7

Sheet D	1	2	3	4	5	6	7	8	9	10	Final
Ken Peddigrew	0	0	0	1	0	X	X	X	X	X	1
Rick Rowsell	0	3	1	0	4	X	X	X	X	X	8

=== Draw 9 ===
February 6, 0930

Sheet A	1	2	3	4	5	6	7	8	9	10	Final
Jeff Staples	0	1	0	0	1	X	X	X	X	X	2
Dean Branton	3	0	4	2	0	X	X	X	X	X	9

Sheet B	1	2	3	4	5	6	7	8	9	10	Final
Brad Gushue	0	2	0	0	3	1	3	X	X	X	9
Ken Peddigrew	1	0	1	0	0	0	0	X	X	X	2

Sheet C	1	2	3	4	5	6	7	8	9	10	Final
Rick Rowsell	0	1	0	2	1	1	0	1	0	X	6
Alex Smith	3	0	2	0	0	0	1	0	3	X	9

=== Draw 10 ===
February 6, 1430

Sheet A	1	2	3	4	5	6	7	8	9	10	Final
Alex Smith	0	2	1	1	0	0	1	0	0	X	5
Keith Ryan	2	0	0	0	2	1	0	0	3	X	8

Sheet B	1	2	3	4	5	6	7	8	9	10	11	Final
Bas Buckle	0	0	1	0	1	0	2	0	1	0	0	5
Rick Rowsell	1	0	0	1	0	1	0	1	0	1	1	6

Sheet C	1	2	3	4	5	6	7	8	9	10	Final
Dean Branton	0	1	2	1	0	1	0	3	0	X	8
Geoff Cunningham	3	0	0	0	1	0	0	0	2	X	6

Sheet D	1	2	3	4	5	6	7	8	9	10	Final
Gary Oke	0	3	3	4	0	X	X	X	X	X	10
Jeff Staples	1	0	0	0	2	X	X	X	X	X	3

=== Draw 11 ===
February 6, 2000

Sheet A	1	2	3	4	5	6	7	8	9	10	Final
Geoff Cunningham	0	0	3	1	0	2	0	2	X	X	8
Bas Buckle	2	2	0	0	1	0	2	0	X	X	7

Sheet B	1	2	3	4	5	6	7	8	9	10	11	Final
Keith Ryan	1	1	0	1	0	1	0	0	2	0	0	6
Ken Peddigrew	0	0	1	0	2	0	1	1	0	1	1	7

Sheet C	1	2	3	4	5	6	7	8	9	10	Final
Gary Oke	0	1	0	1	0	1	1	0	1	0	5
Brad Gushue	2	0	1	0	1	0	0	2	0	1	7

Sheet D	1	2	3	4	5	6	7	8	9	10	Final
Rick Rowsell	0	1	0	2	0	1	0	3	1	X	8
Dean Branton	0	0	2	0	2	0	2	0	0	X	6

=== Draw 12 ===
February 7, 0930

Sheet A	1	2	3	4	5	6	7	8	9	10	Final
Jeff Staples	0	1	2	2	0	0	0	4	X	X	9
Ken Peddigrew	2	0	0	0	3	0	1	0	X	X	6

Sheet B	1	2	3	4	5	6	7	8	9	10	Final
Geoff Cunningham	0	0	0	1	0	1	0	3	0	0	5
Gary Oke	0	1	0	0	1	0	3	0	0	2	7

Sheet C	1	2	3	4	5	6	7	8	9	10	Final
Keith Ryan	0	0	1	2	0	0	0	1	3	X	7
Bas Buckle	1	1	0	0	0	1	1	0	0	X	4

Sheet D	1	2	3	4	5	6	7	8	9	10	Final
Alex Smith	0	1	0	1	0	0	X	X	X	X	2
Brad Gushue	2	0	1	0	0	5	X	X	X	X	8

=== Tiebreakers ===
February 7, 2009

Team	1	2	3	4	5	6	7	8	9	10	Final
Rick Rowsell	0	2	1	2	0	0	0	0	X	X	5
Alex Smith	2	0	0	0	2	1	2	3	X	X	10

February 7, 2009

Team	1	2	3	4	5	6	7	8	9	10	Final
Alex Smith	0	1	0	2	0	0	1	0	0	X	4
Keith Ryan	2	0	1	0	0	3	0	1	1	X	8

== Playoffs ==
Semifinal			Final
			1	Brad Gushue	9
2	Gary Oke	3	3	Keith Ryan	2
3	Keith Ryan	7

Gushue must be defeated twice

=== Semi-final ===
February 8, 0930

Sheet 2	1	2	3	4	5	6	7	8	9	10	Final
Gary Oke	0	1	0	0	1	0	0	1	0	X	3
Keith Ryan	2	0	1	0	0	1	2	0	1	X	7

=== Final ===
February 8, 1430

Team	1	2	3	4	5	6	7	8	9	10	Final
Brad Gushue	3	0	2	2	0	2	X	X	X	X	9
Keith Ryan	0	1	0	0	1	0	X	X	X	X	2
