= 2002 Masters of Curling =

Grand Slam of Curling event

2002 KIA Masters of Curling
- Host city: Gander, Newfoundland and Labrador
- Dates: January 10 – 13
- Winner: (Saskatchewan) Bruce Korte
- Skip: Bruce Korte
- Third: Darrell McKee
- Second: Roger Korte
- Lead: Rory Golanowski
- Finalist: (Manitoba) Jeff Stoughton

The 2002 KIA Masters of Curling was held from January 10 to 13, 2002 in Gander, Newfoundland and Labrador. The event was one of the four men's Grand Slams of the 2001–02 curling season.

The total purse for the event was $100,000, with $30,000 going to the winning team. The format was a triple knockout.

Saskatchewan's Bruce Korte rink defeated Jeff Stoughton of Manitoba in the final, 7–4.

== Teams ==
The event included, one women's rink in Kelley Law, whose team was preparing to represent Canada at the 2002 Winter Olympics. The rink went 2–3.

The teams were as follows:

| Skip | Third | Second | Lead | Locale |
|---|---|---|---|---|
| Dave Boehmer | (?) | (?) | (?) | Winnipeg, Manitoba |
| John Boland | (?) | (?) | (?) | Gander, Newfoundland and Labrador |
| Kerry Burtnyk | (?) | (?) | (?) | Winnipeg, Manitoba |
| Pierre Charette | (?) | (?) | (?) | Buckingham, Quebec |
| Glen Despins | (?) | (?) | (?) | Strongfield, Saskatchewan |
| Glenn Goss | (?) | (?) | (?) | St. John's, Newfoundland and Labrador |
| Bert Gretzinger | (?) | (?) | (?) | Kelowna, British Columbia |
| Brad Gushue | Mark Nichols | Paul Harvey | Gene Trickett | St. John's, Newfoundland and Labrador |
| Glenn Howard | Richard Hart | Collin Mitchell | Jason Mitchell | Coldwater, Ontario |
| Bruce Korte | Art Paulsen | Roger Korte | Rory Golanowski | Saskatoon, Saskatchewan |
| Kelley Law | Julie Skinner | Georgina Wheatcroft | Diane Dezura | New Westminster, British Columbia |
| William Lyburn | (?) | (?) | (?) | Brandon, Manitoba |
| Kevin Martin | Don Walchuk | Carter Rycroft | Don Bartlett | Edmonton, Alberta |
| Pete Matthews | (?) | (?) | (?) | Gander, Newfoundland and Labrador |
| Greg McAulay | Brent Pierce | Bryan Miki | Jody Sveistrup | Richmond, British Columbia |
| Chad McMullan | (?) | (?) | (?) | Toronto, Ontario |
| Wayne Middaugh | Graeme McCarrel | Ian Tetley | Scott Bailey | Midland, Ontario |
| Mark Noseworthy | (?) | (?) | (?) | St. John's, Newfoundland and Labrador |
| Kevin Park | (?) | (?) | (?) | Edmonton, Alberta |
| Vic Peters | Mark Olson | Chris Neufeld | Steve Gould | Winnipeg, Manitoba |
| Neil Power | (?) | (?) | (?) | St. John's, Newfoundland and Labrador |
| Tony Power | (?) | (?) | (?) | Grand Falls, Newfoundland and Labrador |
| Bob Skanes | (?) | (?) | (?) | Gander, Newfoundland and Labrador |
| Jeff Stoughton | Jon Mead | Garry Van Den Berghe | Doug Armstrong | Winnipeg, Manitoba |

== Playoffs ==
Quarterfinals
(Ontario) Wayne Middaugh | 8
(Manitoba) Dave Boehmer | 6
(Manitoba) Jeff Stoughton | 8
(Ontario) Glenn Howard | 5
(Saskatchewan) Bruce Korte | 6
(Manitoba) Vic Peters | 3
(Alberta) Kevin Martin | 3
(Alberta) Kevin Park | 9

Semifinals
(Ontario) Wayne Middaugh | 5
(Manitoba) Jeff Stoughton | 6
(Saskatchewan) Bruce Korte | 6
(Alberta) Kevin Park | 3

Finals
(Manitoba) Jeff Stoughton | 4
(Saskatchewan) Bruce Korte | 7
