= 2010 The National (January) =

Grand Slam of Curling event

The Swiss Chalet National 2010
- Host city: Guelph, Ontario
- Arena: Sleeman Centre
- Dates: January 6–10
- Attendance: 28,431
- Winner: (Newfoundland and Labrador) Team Gushue
- Curling club: Bally Haly G&CC, St. John's, Newfoundland
- Skip: Brad Gushue
- Third: Mark Nichols
- Second: Ryan Fry
- Lead: Jamie Korab
- Finalist: (Alberta) Team Ferbey

The 2010 The National was the second Grand Slam event of the men's 2009-10 curling season. It was held January 6–10 at the Sleeman Centre in Guelph, Ontario.

The event featured just two international teams, gearing up for the upcoming 2010 Winter Olympics. John Shuster's Team USA failed to make the playoffs while Great Britain's David Murdoch lost in the quarter final. Also, Canada's Olympic representative, Kevin Martin failed to make the playoffs at a Slam for the first time since 2003.

The final game featured Brad Gushue's rink from St. John's, Newfoundland against Randy Ferbey's Edmonton rink. Gushue, who lost last year's event beat Ferbey, and with it won his first Grand Slam title.

Gushue's team won $24,000 out of a total purse of $100,000.

== Teams ==
Skip	Third	Second	Lead	Locale
Ted Appelman	Tom Appelman	Brandon Klassen	Brendan Melnyk	(Alberta) Edmonton
Kerry Burtnyk	Don Walchuk	Richard Daneault	Garth Smith	(Manitoba) Winnipeg
David Nedohin (fourth)	Randy Ferbey (skip)	Scott Pfeifer	Marcel Rocque	(Alberta) Edmonton
Sean Geall	Brent Pierce	Kevin Recksiedler	Mark Olson	(British Columbia) New Westminster
Jason Gunnlaugson	Justin Richter	Braden Zawada	Tyler Forrest	(Manitoba) Beausejour
Brad Gushue	Mark Nichols	Ryan Fry	Jamie Korab	(Newfoundland and Labrador) St. John's
Glenn Howard	Richard Hart	Brent Laing	Craig Savill	(Ontario) Coldwater
Brad Jacobs	E. J. Harnden	Ryan Harnden	Caleb Flaxey	(Ontario) Sault Ste. Marie
Kevin Koe	Blake MacDonald	Carter Rycroft	Nolan Thiessen	(Alberta) Edmonton
Kevin Martin	John Morris	Marc Kennedy	Ben Hebert	(Alberta) Edmonton
Dale Matchett	Ryan Werenich	Jeff Gorda	Shawn Kaufman	(Ontario) Bradford
Mike McEwen	B. J. Neufeld	Matt Wozniak	Denni Neufeld	(Manitoba) Winnipeg
Wayne Middaugh	Jon Mead	John Epping	Scott Bailey	(Ontario) Islington
David Murdoch	Ewan MacDonald	Peter Smith	Euan Byers	(Scotland) Lockerbie
John Shuster	Jason Smith	Jeff Isaacson	John Benton	(United States) Duluth
Pat Simmons	Gerry Adam	Jeff Sharp	Steve Laycock	(Saskatchewan) Davidson
Jeff Stoughton	Kevin Park	Rob Fowler	Steve Gould	(Manitoba) Winnipeg
Jim Cotter (fourth)	Bob Ursel (skip)	Kevin Folk	Rick Sawatsky	(British Columbia) Kelowna

== Standings ==
=== Pool A ===
Skip	W	L
(Manitoba) Stoughton	5	0
(Ontario) Middaugh	4	1
(Ontario) Howard	3	2
(United States) Shuster	2	3
(Alberta) Appelman	1	4
(Ontario) Matchett	0	5

Scores:

- Howard 5-2 Matchett
- Stoughton 6-3 Middaugh
- Shuster 8-3 Appelman
- Middaugh 6-5 Matchett
- Stoughton 7-4 Howard
- Stoughton 4-3 Appelman
- Shuster 5-4 Matchett
- Middaugh 6-4 Howard
- Stoughton 6-5 Shuster
- Appelman 8-3 Matchett
- Howard 7-1 Shuster
- Middaugh 8-3 Appelman
- Stoughton 8-4 Matchett
- Middaugh 4-3 Shuster
- Howard 9-4 Appelman

=== Pool B ===
Skip	W	L
(Alberta) Koe	5	0
(Manitoba) McEwen	4	1
(British Columbia) Ursel	3	2
(Saskatchewan) Simmons	2	3
(Alberta) Martin	1	4
(Ontario) Jacobs	0	5

- McEwen 8-3 Jacobs
- Koe 8-6 Ursel
- Simmons 6-4 Martin
- Ursel 10-5 Jacobs
- Koe 6-4 McEwen
- Martin 5-2 Jacobs
- McEwen 7-2 Simmons
- Ursel 7-3 Martin
- Ursel 10-6 Simmons
- Koe 10-5 Jacobs
- McEwen 8-5 Martin
- Koe 7-3 Simmons
- McEwen 8-4 Ursel
- Koe 7-4 Martin
- Simmons 7-5 Jacobs

=== Pool C ===
Skip	W	L
(Alberta) Ferbey	4	1
(Manitoba) Burtnyk	3	2
(Newfoundland and Labrador) Gushue	3	2
(Scotland) Murdoch	3	2
(British Columbia) Geall	1	4
(Manitoba) Gunnlaugson	1	4

- Burtnyk 6-5 Murdoch
- Gushue 7-4 Gunnlaugson
- Ferbey 8-3 Geall
- Burtnyk 7-2 Gunnlaugson
- Murdoch 4-3 Gushue
- Gunnlaugson 7-5 Geall
- Burtnyk 9-3 Ferbey
- Ferbey 7-2 Murdoch
- Gushue 7-1 Geall
- Murdoch 5-4 Geall
- Ferbey 6-1 Gunnlaugson
- Gushue 7-3 Burtnyk
- Geall 5-3 Burtnyk
- Murdoch 6-2 Gunnlaugson
- Ferbey 6-5 Gushue

== Tie breakers ==
- Murdoch 7-5 Burtnyk
- Howard 9-5 Ursel

== Playoffs ==
Quarter-Finals
(Alberta)	Koe	5
(Scotland)	Murdoch	3
(Alberta)	Ferbey	7
(Ontario)	Middaugh	5
(Manitoba)	McEwen	3
(Newfoundland and Labrador)	Gushue	6
(Manitoba)	Stoughton	4
(Ontario)	Howard	6

Semi-Finals
(Alberta)	Koe	5
(Alberta)	Ferbey	9
(Newfoundland and Labrador)	Gushue	6
(Ontario)	Howard	5

Final
(Alberta)	Ferbey	4
(Newfoundland and Labrador)	Gushue	6
