= 2012 Newfoundland and Labrador Tankard =

- Host city: Labrador City
- Arena: Carol Curling Club
- Dates: February 7–12
- Winner: Brad Gushue
- Curling club: Bally Haly G&CC, St. John's
- Skip: Brad Gushue
- Third: Ryan Fry
- Second: Adam Casey
- Lead: Geoff Walker
- Finalist: Ken Peddigrew

The 2012 Newfoundland and Labrador Tankard men's provincial curling championship, was held February 7–12 at the Carol Curling Club in Labrador City, Newfoundland and Labrador. The winning team of Brad Gushue, represented Newfoundland and Labrador at the 2012 Tim Hortons Brier in Saskatoon, Saskatchewan.

== Teams ==
| Skip | Vice | Second | Lead | Alternate | Club |
|---|---|---|---|---|---|
| Brad Gushue | Ryan Fry | Adam Casey | Geoff Walker | | Bally Haly Golf & Curling Club, St. John's |
| Brian Mercer | Kirk Foster | Jody Wentzell | Emile Gagnon | | Carol Curling Club, Labrador City |
| Ken Peddigrew | David Noftall | Jeff Rose | Keith Jewer | | St. John's Curling Club, St. John's |
| Keith Ryan | Barry Edwards | Mike Ryan | Dennis Langdon | Corey Hennessey | Carol Curling Club, Labrador City |
| Donnette Turpin | Barry McLean | Jonathan Branton | Gary Furlong | Bill Fitzgerald | Carol Curling Club, Labrador City |
| Gary Wensman | Jeff Staples | Ivan Davis | Neil Peckham | | Carol Curling Club, Labrador City |

== Standings ==
| Skip (Club) | W | L | PF | PA | Ends Won | Ends Lost | Blank Ends | Stolen Ends |
|---|---|---|---|---|---|---|---|---|
| Brad Gushue (Bally Haly) | 5 | 0 | 39 | 11 | 20 | 10 | 6 | 7 |
| Keith Ryan (Carol) | 4 | 1 | 40 | 17 | 25 | 12 | 2 | 12 |
| Ken Peddigrew (St. John's) | 3 | 2 | 30 | 22 | 15 | 17 | 3 | 4 |
| Donnette Turpin (Carol) | 2 | 3 | 28 | 39 | 18 | 23 | 0 | 3 |
| Brian Mercer (Carol) | 1 | 4 | 23 | 42 | 16 | 20 | 5 | 4 |
| Gary Wensman (Carol) | 0 | 5 | 18 | 47 | 13 | 25 | 0 | 1 |

== Results ==
- All Times Are Local (NT)

=== Draw 1 ===
February 8, 2:00 PM

| Sheet 1 | 1 | 2 | 3 | 4 | 5 | 6 | 7 | 8 | 9 | 10 | Final |
|---|---|---|---|---|---|---|---|---|---|---|---|
| Ken Peddigrew | 1 | 0 | 0 | 1 | 0 | 2 | 0 | 1 | 0 | 2 | 7 |
| Donnette Turpin | 0 | 1 | 0 | 0 | 1 | 0 | 1 | 0 | 1 | 0 | 4 |

| Sheet 2 | 1 | 2 | 3 | 4 | 5 | 6 | 7 | 8 | 9 | 10 | Final |
|---|---|---|---|---|---|---|---|---|---|---|---|
| Brad Gushue | 2 | 0 | 1 | 1 | 2 | 0 | 1 | 4 | X | X | 11 |
| Gary Wensman | 0 | 1 | 0 | 0 | 0 | 1 | 0 | 0 | X | X | 2 |

| Sheet 3 | 1 | 2 | 3 | 4 | 5 | 6 | 7 | 8 | 9 | 10 | Final |
|---|---|---|---|---|---|---|---|---|---|---|---|
| Brian Mercer | 0 | 0 | 1 | 0 | 2 | 0 | 0 | 0 | 0 | X | 3 |
| Keith Ryan | 1 | 1 | 0 | 2 | 0 | 2 | 0 | 1 | 2 | X | 9 |

=== Draw 2 ===
February 8, 7:30 PM

| Sheet 1 | 1 | 2 | 3 | 4 | 5 | 6 | 7 | 8 | 9 | 10 | Final |
|---|---|---|---|---|---|---|---|---|---|---|---|
| Ken Peddigrew | 0 | 2 | 0 | 0 | 0 | 0 | 0 | X | X | X | 2 |
| Keith Ryan | 1 | 0 | 2 | 2 | 1 | 1 | 1 | X | X | X | 8 |

| Sheet 2 | 1 | 2 | 3 | 4 | 5 | 6 | 7 | 8 | 9 | 10 | Final |
|---|---|---|---|---|---|---|---|---|---|---|---|
| Gary Wensman | 0 | 0 | 0 | 1 | 0 | 0 | 3 | 0 | X | X | 4 |
| Brian Mercer | 1 | 1 | 2 | 0 | 2 | 1 | 0 | 3 | X | X | 10 |

| Sheet 3 | 1 | 2 | 3 | 4 | 5 | 6 | 7 | 8 | 9 | 10 | Final |
|---|---|---|---|---|---|---|---|---|---|---|---|
| Brad Gushue | 1 | 0 | 1 | 3 | 0 | 4 | X | X | X | X | 9 |
| Donnette Turpin | 0 | 1 | 0 | 0 | 1 | 0 | X | X | X | X | 2 |

=== Draw 3 ===
February 9, 9:00 AM

| Sheet 1 | 1 | 2 | 3 | 4 | 5 | 6 | 7 | 8 | 9 | 10 | Final |
|---|---|---|---|---|---|---|---|---|---|---|---|
| Brad Gushue | 2 | 0 | 3 | 0 | 3 | 1 | 0 | X | X | X | 9 |
| Brian Mercer | 0 | 1 | 0 | 0 | 0 | 0 | 1 | X | X | X | 2 |

| Sheet 2 | 1 | 2 | 3 | 4 | 5 | 6 | 7 | 8 | 9 | 10 | Final |
|---|---|---|---|---|---|---|---|---|---|---|---|
| Gary Wensman | 0 | 0 | 0 | 1 | 0 | 1 | X | X | X | X | 2 |
| Ken Peddigrew | 1 | 2 | 1 | 0 | 4 | 0 | X | X | X | X | 8 |

| Sheet 3 | 1 | 2 | 3 | 4 | 5 | 6 | 7 | 8 | 9 | 10 | Final |
|---|---|---|---|---|---|---|---|---|---|---|---|
| Donnette Turpin | 2 | 0 | 1 | 0 | 0 | 1 | 0 | 0 | 0 | 0 | 4 |
| Keith Ryan | 0 | 1 | 0 | 0 | 2 | 0 | 1 | 1 | 1 | 5 | 11 |

=== Draw 4 ===
February 9, 3:00 PM

| Sheet 1 | 1 | 2 | 3 | 4 | 5 | 6 | 7 | 8 | 9 | 10 | Final |
|---|---|---|---|---|---|---|---|---|---|---|---|
| Gary Wensman | 3 | 0 | 2 | 0 | 0 | 1 | 0 | 0 | 1 | X | 7 |
| Donnette Turpin | 0 | 4 | 0 | 1 | 1 | 0 | 3 | 1 | 0 | X | 10 |

| Sheet 2 | 1 | 2 | 3 | 4 | 5 | 6 | 7 | 8 | 9 | 10 | Final |
|---|---|---|---|---|---|---|---|---|---|---|---|
| Brad Gushue | 3 | 0 | 1 | 0 | 0 | 0 | 0 | 0 | 0 | 1 | 5 |
| Keith Ryan | 0 | 1 | 0 | 2 | 0 | 0 | 1 | 0 | 0 | 0 | 4 |

| Sheet 3 | 1 | 2 | 3 | 4 | 5 | 6 | 7 | 8 | 9 | 10 | Final |
|---|---|---|---|---|---|---|---|---|---|---|---|
| Ken Peddigrew | 0 | 0 | 2 | 2 | 5 | 0 | 3 | X | X | X | 12 |
| Brian Mercer | 0 | 2 | 0 | 0 | 0 | 1 | 0 | X | X | X | 3 |

=== Draw 5 ===
February 10, 1:30PM

| Sheet 1 | 1 | 2 | 3 | 4 | 5 | 6 | 7 | 8 | 9 | 10 | Final |
|---|---|---|---|---|---|---|---|---|---|---|---|
| Donnette Turpin | 0 | 0 | 0 | 1 | 0 | 4 | 0 | 0 | 2 | 1 | 8 |
| Brian Mercer | 0 | 0 | 1 | 0 | 1 | 0 | 2 | 1 | 0 | 0 | 5 |

| Sheet 2 | 1 | 2 | 3 | 4 | 5 | 6 | 7 | 8 | 9 | 10 | Final |
|---|---|---|---|---|---|---|---|---|---|---|---|
| Brad Gushue | 0 | 2 | 0 | 0 | 0 | 0 | 2 | 1 | X | X | 5 |
| Ken Peddigrew | 0 | 0 | 0 | 0 | 1 | 0 | 0 | 0 | X | X | 1 |

| Sheet 3 | 1 | 2 | 3 | 4 | 5 | 6 | 7 | 8 | 9 | 10 | Final |
|---|---|---|---|---|---|---|---|---|---|---|---|
| Gary Wensman | 0 | 1 | 1 | 0 | 0 | 0 | 0 | 1 | X | X | 3 |
| Keith Ryan | 3 | 0 | 0 | 0 | 1 | 1 | 3 | 0 | X | X | 8 |

== Playoffs ==
| SemiFinal | | | Final 1 | | | Final 2 (if necessary) |
| | | | 1 | Brad Gushue | 9 |
| 2 | Keith Ryan | 3 | 3 | Ken Peddigrew | 3 |
| 3 | Ken Peddigrew | 5 | | | | 1 | Brad Gushue |
| | | | | | | 1 | Brad Gushue |

=== Semifinal ===
February 10, 7:30 PM

| Sheet 2 | 1 | 2 | 3 | 4 | 5 | 6 | 7 | 8 | 9 | 10 | Final |
|---|---|---|---|---|---|---|---|---|---|---|---|
| Keith Ryan | 1 | 0 | 1 | 0 | 0 | 0 | 1 | 0 | 0 | 0 | 3 |
| Ken Peddigrew | 0 | 1 | 0 | 1 | 0 | 1 | 0 | 1 | 0 | 1 | 5 |

=== Final 1 ===
February 11, 2:30 PM

| Sheet 2 | 1 | 2 | 3 | 4 | 5 | 6 | 7 | 8 | 9 | 10 | Final |
|---|---|---|---|---|---|---|---|---|---|---|---|
| Brad Gushue* | 2 | 0 | 2 | 0 | 0 | 0 | 0 | 2 | 3 | X | 9 |
| Ken Peddigrew | 0 | 2 | 0 | 0 | 0 | 1 | 0 | 0 | 0 | X | 3 |

=== Final 2 ===
February 11, 7:30 PM (If Necessary)

| Sheet 2 | 1 | 2 | 3 | 4 | 5 | 6 | 7 | 8 | 9 | 10 | Final |
|---|---|---|---|---|---|---|---|---|---|---|---|
| Brad Gushue | 0 | 0 | 0 | 0 | 0 | 0 | 0 | 0 | 0 | 0 | 0 |
| Brad Gushue | 0 | 0 | 0 | 0 | 0 | 0 | 0 | 0 | 0 | 0 | 0 |

* Gushue must be beaten twice

2012 Newfoundland and Labrador Tankard

Brad Gushue
Newfoundland and Labrador Provincial Championship title
