= Ryan LeDrew =

Canadian curler (born 1982)

Medal record

Curling

Representing (Newfoundland and Labrador) Newfoundland

Canada Winter Games
Bronze medal – third place	1999 Corner Brook	

Ryan LeDrew (born August 18, 1982 in Corner Brook, Newfoundland) is a Canadian curler from Sarnia, Ontario.

== Career ==
=== Juniors ===
Growing up in Newfoundland, LeDrew represented the province at the 1999 Canada Winter Games in his birthplace of Corner Brook. He won a bronze medal at the event. LeDrew participated in 8 provincial junior curling championships, finally winning in 2002. He skipped Newfoundland and Labrador at the 2002 Canadian Junior Curling Championships with teammates Mike Adam, Brent Hamilton and Nick Lane. He led the team to a 4–8 record, missing the playoffs.

=== 2006 Brier ===
When the perennial provincial champion Brad Gushue rink represented Canada at the 2006 Winter Olympics, they eschewed playing in the 2006 provincial playdowns, opening the door for other teams to represent the province at the Brier. LeDrew at the time was playing third for the Ken Peddigrew rink. The team won the Newfoundland and Labrador Tankard, earning the team the right to represent the province at the 2006 Tim Hortons Brier, where the team finished with a 2–9 record and missed the playoffs.

=== University career ===
LeDrew represented Memorial University at the 2008 and 2009 CIS/CCA Curling Championships. He won the fair play award in 2009.

== Personal life ==
LeDrew attended high school at Prince of Wales Collegiate in St. John's, Newfoundland and Labrador. He later moved to Sarnia, Ontario. His mother Diane Ryan-LeDrew was pregnant with him when she played for Newfoundland at the 1982 Scott Tournament of Hearts. His sister Stephanie, is another competitive curler.
