= Adam Casey (curler) =

Canadian curler (born 1989)

- Curler
- Born: August 28, 1989 (age 37); Seven Mile Bay, Prince Edward Island, Canada

Team
- Curling club: Silver Fox C&YC, Summerside, PEI

Curling career
- Member Association: Prince Edward Island (2006-2010; 2014-2016; 2022–present); Nova Scotia (2010-2011); Newfoundland and Labrador (2011-2014); Saskatchewan (2016-2018); Ontario (2018-2019); Manitoba (2019-2022)
- Brier: 11 (2012, 2013, 2014, 2015, 2016, 2017, 2020, 2021, 2022, 2025, 2026)
- Pan Continental Championship: 1 (2024)
- Top CTRS ranking: 5th (2021–22)
Medal record
Men's curling
Representing Canada
The Brier
Bronze medal – third place	2025 Kelowna
World Junior Curling Championships
Silver medal – second place	2009 Vancouver
Representing Prince Edward Island
Canada Games
Bronze medal – third place	2007 Whitehorse

Adam Adrian Casey (born August 28, 1989) is a Canadian curler originally from Charlottetown, Prince Edward Island.

== Career ==
As a junior, Casey played in Prince Edward Island as the third on the Brett Gallant junior men's team. As a member of the team, Casey won 5 straight provincial junior championships from 2006 to 2010 inclusively. In 2007, they won a bronze medal at the Canada Winter Games. The team won the 2009 Canadian Junior Curling Championships and won a silver medal at the 2009 World Junior Curling Championships.

After juniors in 2010, Casey moved to Nova Scotia to play third for the Chris Sutherland rink. The team made it to the 2011 Nova Scotia Men's Molson Provincial Championship, but they were eliminated before the playoffs.

After the season, it was announced that Casey would join the Newfoundland-based Brad Gushue rink, as the team's second. The team easily won the 2012 Newfoundland and Labrador Tankard, giving Casey the trip to his first Brier. While playing for Gushue in Newfoundland, Casey continued his Industrial Engineering studies at Dalhousie University in Halifax, completing his work by correspondence.

He left the Gushue rink in 2014 to form his own rink, consisting of third Josh Barry, second Anson Carmody, and lead Robbie Doherty.

In 2020 Casey joined Ryan Fry as the only curlers to represent four provinces at the Brier, playing second for Jason Gunnlaugson's Manitoba rink.

== Personal life ==
Casey currently serves as vice president, operations at MDS Coating. He is married and has a son and a daughter. He currently lives in Charlottetown.

== Grand Slam record ==
Key
C	Champion
F	Lost in Final
SF	Lost in Semifinal
QF	Lost in Quarterfinals
R16	Lost in the round of 16
Q	Did not advance to playoffs
T2	Played in Tier 2 event
DNP	Did not participate in event
N/A	Not a Grand Slam event that season

Event	2011–12	2012–13	2013–14	2014–15	2015–16	2016–17	2017–18	2018–19	2019–20	2020–21	2021–22
Elite 10	N/A	N/A	N/A	DNP	DNP	DNP	DNP	DNP	N/A	N/A	N/A
Masters	QF	Q	DNP	DNP	DNP	DNP	DNP	DNP	DNP	N/A	Q
Tour Challenge	N/A	N/A	N/A	N/A	Q	DNP	T2	T2	Q	N/A	N/A
The National	SF	QF	F	Q	DNP	DNP	DNP	DNP	DNP	N/A	Q
Canadian Open	Q	QF	F	Q	Q	DNP	DNP	DNP	Q	N/A	N/A
Players'	Q	QF	SF	DNP	DNP	DNP	DNP	DNP	N/A	Q	QF
Champions Cup	N/A	N/A	N/A	N/A	DNP	DNP	DNP	DNP	N/A	Q	DNP
