= Brad Gushue =

Canadian curler (born 1980)

- Curler
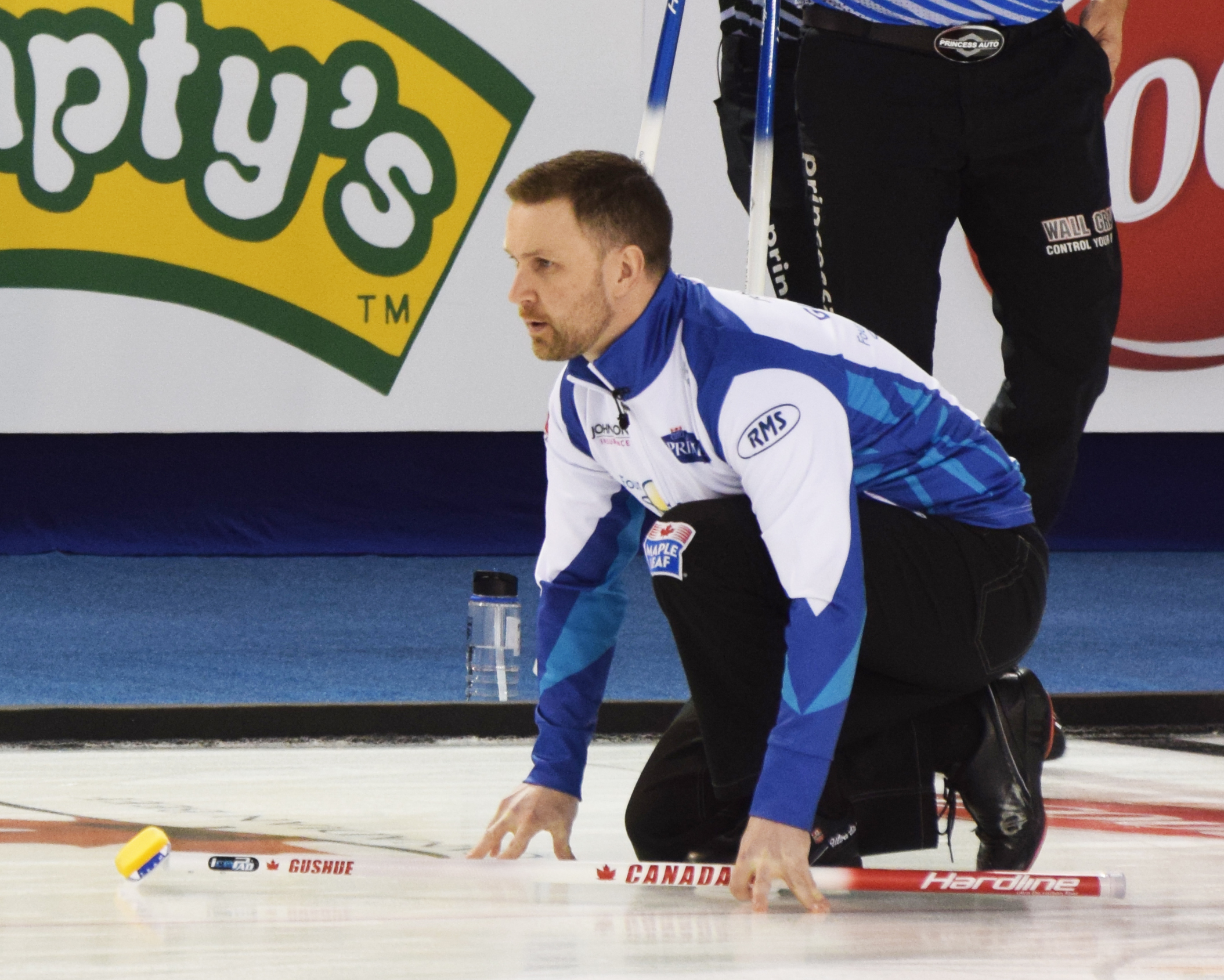
- Gushue watches his shot at the 2018 Elite 10 in Winnipeg, Manitoba.
- Born: Bradley Raymond Gushue; June 16, 1980 (age 46); St. John's, Newfoundland, Canada
- Height: 183 cm (6 ft 0 in)

Team
- Curling club: St. John's CC, St. John's, Newfoundland and Labrador

Curling career
- Member Association: Newfoundland and Labrador
- Brier: 23 (2003, 2004, 2005, 2007, 2008, 2009, 2010, 2011, 2012, 2013, 2014, 2015, 2016, 2017, 2018, 2019, 2020, 2021, 2022, 2023, 2024, 2025, 2026)
- World Championship: 5 (2017, 2018, 2022, 2023, 2024)
- World Mixed Doubles Championship: 1 (2021)
- Pan Continental Championship: 3 (2022, 2023, 2024)
- Olympic: 2 (2006, 2022)
- Top CTRS ranking: 1st (2016–17, 2017–18, 2021–22, 2022–23, 2023–24)
- Grand Slam victories: 15 (2010 National (Jan.), 2014 Masters, 2014 Canadian Open, 2015 National, 2016 Elite 10, 2016 Players', 2017 Canadian Open, 2017 Tour Challenge, 2017 Masters, 2018 Champions Cup, 2018 Elite 10 (Sept.), 2021 National, 2022 Champions Cup, 2022 National, 2024 Players')
Medal record
Men's curling
Representing Canada
Winter Olympics
Gold medal – first place	2006 Turin	Team
Bronze medal – third place	2022 Beijing	Team
World Championships
Gold medal – first place	2017 Edmonton
Silver medal – second place	2018 Las Vegas
Silver medal – second place	2022 Las Vegas
Silver medal – second place	2023 Ottawa
Silver medal – second place	2024 Schaffhausen
World Junior Championships
Gold medal – first place	1998 Thunder Bay
Gold medal – first place	2001 Ogden
Pan Continental Championships
Gold medal – first place	2022 Calgary
Gold medal – first place	2023 Kelowna
The Brier
Gold medal – first place	2018 Regina
Gold medal – first place	2023 London
Gold medal – first place	2024 Regina
Bronze medal – third place	2025 Kelowna
Representing Newfoundland and Labrador
Canadian Olympic Trials
Gold medal – first place	2005 Halifax
Gold medal – first place	2021 Saskatoon
Bronze medal – third place	2013 Winnipeg
Bronze medal – third place	2017 Ottawa
Canadian Olympic Mixed Doubles Trials
Silver medal – second place	2018 Portage la Prairie
The Brier
Gold medal – first place	2017 St. John's
Gold medal – first place	2020 Kingston
Silver medal – second place	2007 Hamilton
Silver medal – second place	2016 Ottawa
Bronze medal – third place	2011 London
Canadian Mixed Doubles Championships
Gold medal – first place	2021 Calgary
Representing (Newfoundland and Labrador) Wild Card
The Brier
Gold medal – first place	2022 Lethbridge

Bradley Raymond Gushue, ONL (/ˈɡʊʒu/ GUU-zhoo; born June 16, 1980) is a Canadian retired curler from St. John's, Newfoundland and Labrador. Gushue, along with teammates Russ Howard, Mark Nichols, Jamie Korab and Mike Adam, represented Canada in curling at the 2006 Winter Olympics, where they won the gold medal by defeating Finland 10–4. He also represented Canada at the 2022 Winter Olympics, where he won a bronze medal. In addition to the Olympics, Gushue won the 2017 World Men's Curling Championship with teammates Mark Nichols, Brett Gallant, and Geoff Walker.

Gushue played in 23 Briers, Canada's national men's curling championship, more than any other curler, and won the event a record six times, equalling the most ever with teammates Mark Nichols and Geoff Walker and Albertan Randy Ferbey. He was a Brier champion skip in 2017, 2018, 2020, 2022, 2023 and 2024 all with Nichols, Gallant and Walker, except for 2023 and 2024 with E. J. Harnden replacing Gallant. Their win in 2017 was Newfoundland and Labrador's first Brier title in 41 years. At the 2018 Tim Hortons Brier, Gushue set a new record for Brier game wins as a skip, breaking a three-way tie with previous record-holders Russ Howard and Kevin Martin. Gushue played in the Brier every year from 2003 to 2026, except in 2006, when he was unable to participate due to being at the Olympics in Italy. He represented his native Newfoundland and Labrador in each edition except in 2018, 2019, 2021, 2023, 2024 and 2025, where as defending champion, his rink was designated Team Canada, and at the 2022 Tim Hortons Brier, when he was the Wild Card 1 team, as the team missed the Newfoundland and Labrador playdowns as they were at the Olympics.

== Career ==
=== Junior ===
Gushue won his first provincial title of any kind in 1995, when he won that year's Men's Newfoundland and Labrador Junior Championship playing second for a team skipped by Ryan Davis. This qualified his rink to play at the 1995 Canadian Junior Curling Championships, where he was the youngest competitor in either the men's or women's fields, at the age of 14. There, the team finished in last place with 1–10 record. Gushue recalls "crying after just about every game because we got the (crap) kicked out of us". Gushue hated throwing second stones, and would only skip teams from that point on in his career.

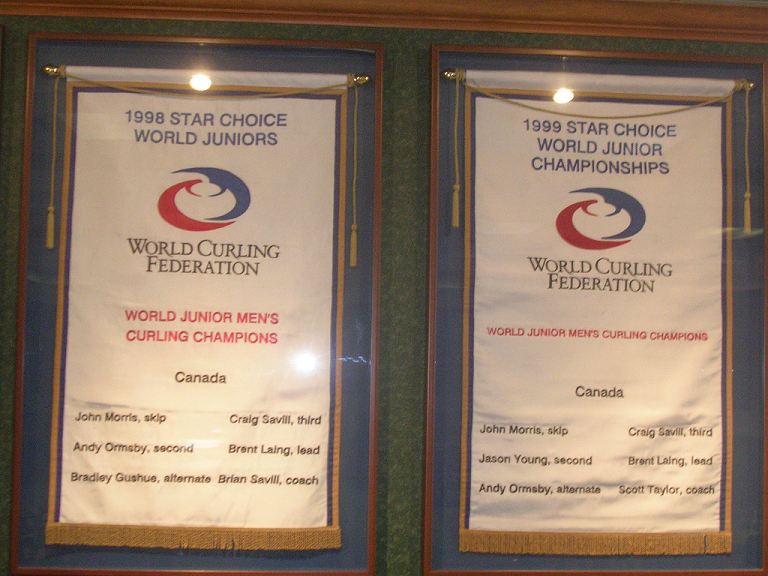
Banners for the 1998 and 1999 World Junior Men's Championship teams. Gushue was the alternate on the 1998 team

Gushue would go on to win five more provincial junior titles as a skip (1996, 1998, 1999, 2000, 2001). At the 1996 Canadian Junior Curling Championships, he led his team of Randy Turpin, Brett Reynolds and Colin Josephson to a 5–7 record. At the 1998 Canadian Junior Curling Championships, he led his team of Ryan Davis, Jason Davidge and Reynolds to a 4–8 record. Following the event, Gushue was named the alternate for the John Morris rink at the 1998 World Junior Curling Championships, which they won. Gushue played in one game at the event.

At the 1999 Canadian Junior Curling Championships, with a new team of Mark Nichols, Neal Blackmore and Steve Parsons, he improved significantly, finishing the event with an 8–4 record. This put them into the semifinal, where they lost to Ontario's John Morris rink, settling for bronze medals. At the 2000 Canadian Junior Curling Championships, with a new front end of Jamie Korab and Mike Adam, Gushue led Newfoundland to an even better 10–2 record. In the playoffs, they downed Saskatchewan's Brock Montgomery rink in the semis, before losing to British Columbia's Brad Kuhn rink in the final, settling for silver medals. The game was lost when Gushue came up short on a draw attempt in an extra end. Gushue was named the all-star skip at the tournament.

At the 2001 Canadian Juniors, the team, with new second Brent Hamilton, finished the round robin with a 9–3 record, tied for first place. The team earned a bye to the final against Manitoba's Mike McEwen team, which Gushue and company beat, winning the championship title. Gushue finished the tournament with a record 38 career victories, eclipsing Morris who had 33, and also held records for most appearances at six, and most as a skip at five. The team then went on to represent Canada at the 2001 World Junior Curling Championships, where he led the team to a 7–2 round robin record. The team then beat Scotland (skipped by David Edwards in the semifinal before beating Denmark (Casper Bossen) in the final to claim gold. Gushue made a successful takeout to break a 6–6 tie in the 10th end to win the game.

=== Men's ===
==== Early men's: 2002–2005 ====
After his outstanding career as a junior, Gushue made an impressive transition into men's curling, and his team quickly became a competitive force. Gushue, and his new men's team played in the first edition of the Masters Grand Slam event in 2002 at home in Newfoundland. The team managed two wins before being eliminated.

Gushue played in the Newfoundland and Labrador provincial men's championship for the first time in 2002 with teammates Mark Nichols, Mike Adam and Eugene Trickett. The team made it to the playoffs, before losing in the 3 vs. 4 page playoff game to Mark Noseworthy, who went on to win the event. Gushue would then win the provincial tankard the following year with teammates Nichols, Jamie Korab and Mark Ward, defeating Noseworthy in the final, 7–3. This qualified them for the 2003 Nokia Brier, Canada's national championship. In the meantime, Gushue, Nichols and different front end of Denni Neufeld and Mike Adam played in the 2003 Players' Championship Grand Slam held before the Brier. There, the team lost all three of their games. At the 2003 Brier, the team finished with a 6–5 record, just missing the playoffs. He was the youngest skip at the event.

Gushue won his first World Curling Tour event at the 2003 Coupe Saguenay de Curling event with teammates Craig Kochan, Ian Robertson and Ken McDermot. Gushue, Nichols, Korab and Ward won their second straight Newfoundland championship in 2004, defeating Mark Noseworthy again, 7–2 in a game that had to be postponed due to a power outage and freezing weather in Labrador City. This qualified the quartet for the 2004 Nokia Brier, where Gushue was the youngest player in the field. There, Gushue proved not only was he one of the best curlers in Newfoundland, but one of the best in Canada, when his team finished with an 8–3 round robin record, and placed fourth after losing the 3 vs. 4 page playoff game against British Columbia's Jay Peachey rink. Gushue was named the All Star skip at the Brier for the first time. The team wrapped up the season at the 2004 Players' Championship on home ice in St. John's, where they made it as far as a tiebreaker before losing to Guy Hemmings.

Team Gushue, now with Keith Ryan at second and Korab at lead had an even busier 2004–05 season. They played in the 2004 BDO Curling Classic Grand Slam, but did not make the playoffs. A month later, the team won the Canada Cup East event, qualifying the team for the 2005 Canadian Olympic Curling Trials, something they had just missed out on doing at the previous Brier. In the new year, the team played in the 2005 Canadian Open of Curling Grand Slam event, going 1–3 in pool play and missing the playoffs. The team then had to quickly head back to Newfoundland for the provincial championship, where they beat Mark Noseworthy again in the final, 5–4. At the 2005 Tim Hortons Brier, his team once again finished 6–5. Soon afterwards, the team played in the 2005 Canada Cup of Curling where they went 1–4 in pool place. The team wrapped up the season by making it to Gushue's first Slam final at the 2005 Players' Championship, when he finished second after losing to Kevin Martin in the final game.

==== Golden Gushue: 2005–06 ====
In April 2005, it was announced that Gushue brought in former world champion Russ Howard as fifth man on the team to bring experience and advice for the Canadian Olympic trials. Shortly afterwards, second Mike Adam (who had replaced Keith Ryan at second) volunteered to step aside for Howard, as the team felt that Howard's skills and experience gave them the best chance to make it to the Olympics. Howard, playing as second, was given the right to call the team's shots as a skip would but would defer to Gushue for the final word on calls. (Under international rules, Howard was nominally the skip, holding the broom in the house and sweeping opponents' stones behind the tee line.) The team first experimented with this lineup at the 2005 National Grand Slam, where they made it to the quarterfinals, before losing to Randy Ferbey.

While many critics didn't give the team a chance going into the 2005 Olympic Trials, the personnel change was a success, with the team finishing the round robin with an 8–1 record, good enough for first place, and a bye to the final on December 11, 2005, against Jeff Stoughton, who was one of those critics. Gushue, who was the youngest last-rock thrower at the event, defeated Stoughton 8–7. He made a runback on his last, taking out a Stoughton rock, convinced he had won. Stoughton, hoping that one of his rocks was biting then drew to the house, hoping to have tied the game at 8. However, a measurement determined that Stoughton had only scored one, thus losing the game. With the win, the team qualified for the 2006 Winter Olympics in Turin, Italy, making Gushue (with Nichols, Korab and Adams) only the second Newfoundlander to represent Canada at the Winter Olympics after Dwayne Norris.

Following the Trials, the team played in the 2006 BDO Classic Canadian Open Slam event as a tune-up for the Olympics. The team finished the event with a 2–2 record in pool play, and lost to Dave Boehmer in a tiebreaker. The team's final event before the Olympics was the 2006 Canada Cup of Curling, where they missed the playoffs after finishing with a 2–3 record.

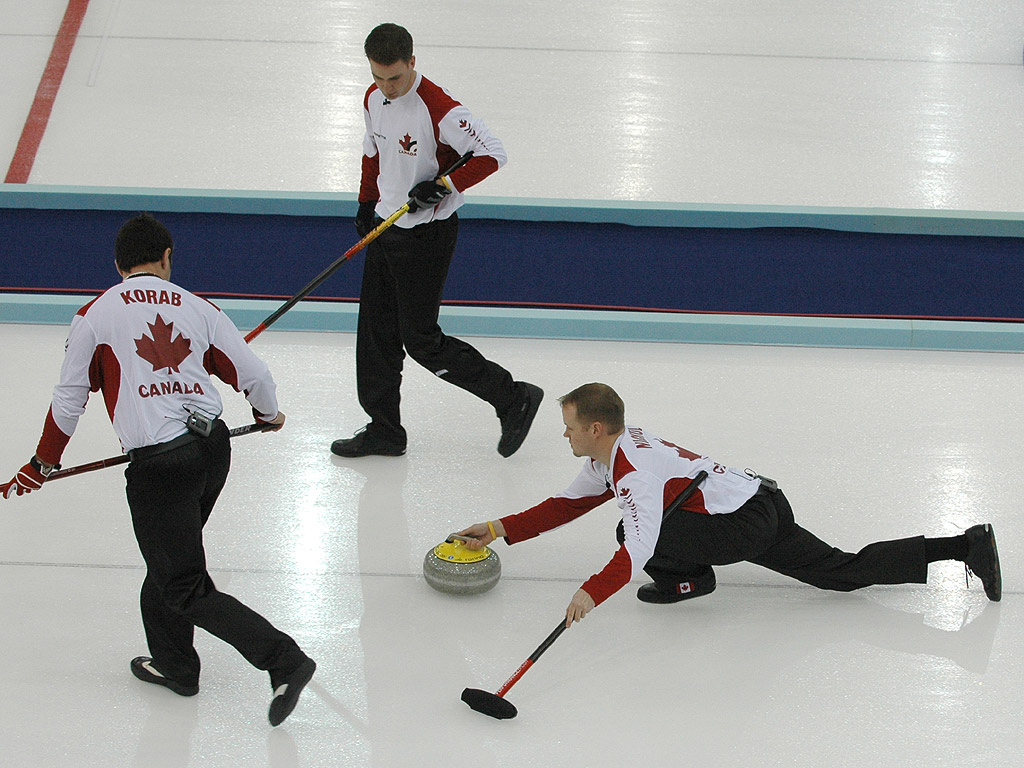
Gushue (middle) at the 2006 Olympics

At the Olympics, the World Curling Federation officially considered Russ Howard the team's skip, as he held the broom in the house, even though the team was still called "Team Gushue" in Canada. There, the team finished the round robin portion with a 6–3 record, including a loss to the host Italians, skipped by Joel Retornaz who became an "overnight celebrity" in the country which only had about 150 curlers at the time. The record was good enough to make the playoffs, where they first played the United States, skipped by Pete Fenson, in the semifinal. The team had their best game of the event up that point, beating the Americans 11–5. This put the team into the final against surprise finalist Finland's Markku Uusipaavalniemi. On February 24, the date of the final, a provincial order allowed for the closure of all schools across Newfoundland and Labrador at noon, one hour before local coverage of the event began to allow students to watch the game, with the province's education minister Joan Burke stating "[w]e want our students to remember exactly where they were when they saw the world recognize the talent in this province". The game started out close, with Canada up 4–3 after five, but Canada put the game away by scoring a six-ender in the sixth. Gushue actually had a draw for seven on his last, but adrenaline got the best of him, and his rock sailed through the house. The game went two more ends before Finland conceded, with Canada winning its first gold medal in men's curling, by a final score of 10–4. With his teammates, Gushue became the first Newfoundlander ever to win an Olympic gold medal. Following their victory, the team received honorary degrees from Memorial University and had a highway named after them.

The team wrapped up the season at the 2006 Players' Championship, where they were win-less, losing all four games in pool play.

==== Brier runners-up: 2006–07 ====
In June 2006, it was announced that Alberta curler Chris Schille was joining the team at second, with Adam initially planning on remaining the team's fifth player (neither Howard, who was 50, nor Adam could commit to another quadrennial. Adam would later leave the team to concentrate on his studies). Schille had been approached by the team at the Players' Championship, and was thought to be a good fit. The team started the season off strong, winning the 2006 Swiss Cup Basel on the World Curling Tour, their second event of the season. Howard played in one last event with the team at the 2006 Continental Cup of Curling, where they were part of the greater North American Team. Europe went on to defeat North America at the event. A week later, the team played in their first Slam of the year, the 2006 Masters of Curling, going 2–3 and missing the playoffs. The team went 2–3 again at the next Slam, the 2007 Canadian Open, at which Gushue complained about the Slam's decision to reduce games to 8 ends from 10, stating "I absolutely hate it...[w]hat you're going to see more of is a lot of blowouts... because all of a sudden halfway through the game is only four ends".

Gushue won the 2007 provincial championship, defeating Trent Skanes in the final, 8–4, sending his team to the 2007 Tim Hortons Brier. Gushue seemed ready to add a Brier title to his Olympic Gold, finishing the round robin with a strong 8–3 record, in a three-way tie for 2nd place. The rink earned itself a spot in the 1v2 Page Playoff game due to a shootout held earlier in the week. There, he beat Ontario's Glenn Howard (who he had lost to in the round robin), 7–6, earning the team the bye to the final. Earlier in the week, Russ Howard and Alberta skip Kevin Martin had questioned Gushue's ability to call the game without Russ holding the broom, but Gushue making the final put to bed those notions. After the game, icemaker Dave Merklinger complained about how many horsehairs the team left on the ice from their brooms, to which Gushue responded "[a]ll that talk about our equipment is a pile of garbage, [a]n excuse". In the final, the team faced a rematch with Glenn, and this time would lose, 10–6. The turning point in the game came in the 7th end, when the teams were tied 5-5 and with Gushue having hammer, rather throwing a routine hit for 1, he tried an extremely difficult double talkeout for 3 saying "[i]f we make this, we win the game". Gushue missed the shot, crashing on a guard, giving up a steal of 2, firmly handing the momentum over to the Howard side. Gushue blamed the miss on a pick, and "never had a chance". Immediately after the Brier, the team played in the 2007 Canada Cup of Curling, going 3–2 in pool play. They then won a tiebreaker against Mark Johnson, defeated Joel Jordison in the page A2 vs B2 game, then lost to Randy Ferbey in the semifinal.

A month following their runner-up finish at the 2007 Tim Hortons Brier in Hamilton, Gushue announced that longtime teammate Jamie Korab was cut from the team. Despite a strong Brier appearance and season, Gushue said that the team seemed to lack a needed chemistry and that Korab's departure was a group decision. The decision was very controversial at the time, especially in Newfoundland, where Gushue was "vilified" online and on radio call-in shows. Korab was replaced by Andrew Gibson in their final event of the season, the 2007 Players' Championship. At the Players', the team did not make the playoffs, winning just 2 games.

==== 2007–2010 ====
For the 2007–08 season, David Noftall assumed the lead position, but this did not prove to be a winning combination. The team played in all four Slams that season, beginning with the Canadian Open, where they went 2–3, followed up by The National a few weeks later, where they went 2–3 again, and the Masters in the New Year, where they went 3–2 before losing in a tiebreaker to Martin Ferland. The team played in the 2007 Casino Rama Curling Skins Game, losing in the semifinal to Kevin Martin when Martin won a draw to the button to claim the last skin. Gushue took home $6,000 in the game.

Gushue won his second straight provincial title, defeating Labrador City's Keith Ryan in final of the 2008 Newfoundland and Labrador Tankard. The team then played at the 2008 Canada Cup of Curling, going 4–1 in pool play. In the playoffs however, they lost both of their games, losing to Kevin Koe in the A1 vs B1 game, and Kevin Martin in the semifinal. At the 2008 Tim Hortons Brier, Gushue's team failed to make the playoffs, losing a tie-breaker to British Columbia's Bob Ursel after finishing the round robin with a 7–4 record. The team wrapped up the season by going 2–3 at the 2008 Players' Championship in April. Following the Players', it was announced that Gushue would be replacing his front-end for the sixth straight year. Korab rejoined the team as lead and Ryan Fry joined the team at second. Schille could no longer play on the team due to "revised residency restrictions" in Newfoundland.

The new-look Gushue rink began the season strongly, winning the 2008 Swiss Cup Basel tour event. The team then played in the Masters, where they topped their pool with a 4–1 record, and made it as far as the semifinal before losing to Kevin Koe. The following month, the team again went 4–1 at a Slam, this time the 2008 National. They did even better in the playoffs, making it to the final, where they lost to Wayne Middaugh. Gushue had a chance to win the game, as he had hammer in the last end, with the game tied at 3. He was heavy on his draw however, and rubbed off a Middaugh stone, giving up a steal of two, and losing the game. The team also had a strong showing at the 2009 Canadian Open, where they finished 4–1 in pool play before losing in the quarter final to Mike McEwen.

Team Gushue won the 2009 Newfoundland and Labrador Provincial Men's Curling Championship, defeating Keith Ryan again in the final. At the 2009 Tim Hortons Brier, Team Gushue performed strongly, ending the round robin in 3rd place with an 8–3 record. However, a loss in the 3v4 game to eventual runner-up Jeff Stoughton left him finishing the event in 4th place. Stoughton won the game on his last shot, a double-raise takeout and stick for two. Gushue came under controversy during the event when the Canadian Curling Association (CCA) attempted to fine Gushue for saying "God damn it, hit the guard" during their game against Ontario. However, the fine was rescinded when Gushue pointed out that the CCA had no list of unacceptable words. A week late, the team played in the 2009 Canada Cup of Curling, finishing with a 2–3 record in pool play. The team then finished the season at the 2009 Players' Championship, where they lost in the quarterfinal to Mike McEwen.

Team Gushue began the 2009–10 curling season by winning their first two tour events, the 2009 Baden Masters and the AMJ Campbell Shorty Jenkins Classic tour events. The following month, the team played in the 2009 World Cup of Curling, which was that season's iteration of the Masters Slam. The team went 3–3 in pool play, and lost to Kevin Koe in the semifinal. Despite the tour wins, Gushue said they got lucky", and did not think his team was playing well, as they hadn't been able to practice on good ice yet.

The Gushue rink was not one of the four teams to automatically qualify 2009 Canadian Olympic Curling Trials, as they weren't able to win the Brier, Canada Cup or Players' Championship in the previous season, or have a high enough ranking in the CTRS standings. This forced the team to play in the pre-trials event if they wanted to repeat the 2006 gold medal performance. The team failed to make it out of the 2009 Canadian Olympic Curling Trials pre-qualifying tournament, where they won just one game, losing three straight, and were eliminated by Jean-Michel Ménard.

After a disappointing pre-trials performance, the team started the New Year at The National Grand Slam event. There, the team squeaked into the playoffs with a 3–2 record in pool play. They then beat Mike McEwen and Glenn Howard in the playoffs before facing off against Randy Ferbey in the final. In the final, Gushue made a hit-and-stick for two on his last to claim a 6–4 win and his first ever Grand Slam title. Two weeks later, the team played in the 2010 Canadian Open Slam, but did not make the playoffs after posting a 1–4 record in pool play.

The team then set their sights at the 2010 Tim Hortons Brier. The team won the 2010 Newfoundland and Labrador Tankard, defeating Alex Smith 8–2 in the provincial final. A the Brier, they would again be a playoff team, ending the round robin in 4th place with an 8–3 record. However, he would lose to eventual winner Kevin Koe in the 3v4 game, for the 2nd straight year finishing in 4th place. The team finished the season at the 2010 Players' Championship, where they made it to their second Slam final that season. This time, they faced off against Kevin Martin who had just won the gold medal at the 2010 Winter Olympics. The final went into an extra end, but Martin had hammer and was able to keep the sheet open, and had a hit and stick for the win.

==== Ferbey experiment: 2010–11 ====
In April 2010, prior to the Players' Championship, it was announced that the "Ferbey Four" was breaking up, with Randy Ferbey joining Gushue's team, holding the broom but throwing third rocks, and Gushue continuing to throw last rocks. The two had been seen as rivals earlier in Gushue's career, sharing words at the 2003 Brier. Mark Nichols moved from third to second position and Ryan Fry would play lead. Jamie Korab decided to take a break from the game. The arrangement did not include a provision that Ferbey play provincials in Newfoundland. In their first event as a team, the rink lost to Thomas Lips in the final of the 2010 Baden Masters. The team's first Slam together was the 2010 World Cup of Curling held two months later. There, the team finished with a 3–2 record in pool play, won their tiebreaker against Pat Simmons, but lost to Jeff Stoughton in the quarterfinal. A few weeks later, the team played in the 2010 Canada Cup of Curling with Ferbey's former lead Marcel Rocque subbing for Fry who had work commitments. At the Canada Cup, they missed the playoffs after posting a 3–2 record. A couple weeks later, the team played in The National, missing the playoffs with a 2–3 pool record. The team then played one event in the New Year, the Canadian Open, where they went 1–4.

Gushue, with Nichols at third, Fry at second, and the team's alternate Jamie Danbrook playing lead won the 2011 Newfoundland and Labrador Tankard, defeating Alex Smith in the final for the second straight year. Ferbey went back to Alberta and played in the Alberta provincials. Just before provincials on February 9, Ferbey announced that he was no longer going to curl with the Gushue team, citing a clash of personalities. He stated, "I was done curling with them in Oshawa (at the Canadian Open Grand Slam Event). At the 2011 Tim Hortons Brier event in London, the Gushue Rink won the first-ever Brier bronze medal game, defeating Kevin Martin (Alberta) 10–5. He had a strong round robin, for the first time in his career, finishing the round robin tied in 1st place at 9–2 (Manitoba's Jeff Stoughton and Alberta's Kevin Martin were also 9–2 but had lost their round robin meetings with Gushue). He would lose both the 1v2 game to Stoughton and the semifinal to Ontario's Glenn Howard. Still, this would be his first podium finish at the Brier since his silver in 2007 and his second medal overall. The bronze game was an emotional one for Nichols, who had planned to take the next season off to concentrate on his family and a career as a personal trainer, announcing before the Brier that it would be his last event with the Gushue rink.

==== No Nichols: 2011–14 ====
For the 2011–12 season, Gushue added Geoff Walker of Alberta, and Adam Casey of PEI to the team, with Ryan throwing third stones. The two had joined the rink at the 2011 Victoria Curling Classic Invitational as a trial run at the end of the previous season.

The new Gushue rink saw some success early on in the season, winning the 2011 Swiss Cup Basel, beating Peter de Cruz in the final. A month later, the team played in their first Slam together, the 2011 World Cup of Curling. There, the team topped their pool with a 4–1 record, but lost in the quarterfinal to John Epping. Then it was off to the Canadian Open in December, where the team missed the playoffs with a 2–3 record. In the New Year, the team rebounded at the 2012 National, where they lost in the semis to Kevin Martin after going 3–2 in pool play.

Team Gushue won the 2012 Newfoundland and Labrador Tankard, defeating Ken Peddigrew 9–3 in the final. The team missed the playoffs at the 2012 Tim Hortons Brier, posting a 5–6 record. It was the first time Gushue had a losing record at a Brier. Following the Brier, Fry was cut from the team stating that he "never seemed to be on the same page" as the team. The team brought in Brett Gallant from Prince Edward Island to replace him for the season-ending 2012 Players' Championship. A the Players', the team finished out of the playoffs with a 3–4 record.

During the 2012 off-season, Gallant signed on with the team as their new player. In their first slam of the 2012–13 season, the team went 2–3 at the 2012 Masters, missing the playoffs. The team had a disastrous showing at the 2012 Canada Cup, losing all six of their games. They had more success at the 2012 Canadian Open of Curling, going 3–2 in pool play, but lost to Mark Kean in the quarters. At the 2013 National played in the New Year, the team went 3–2 again. They won their tiebreaker match against Steve Laycock, but lost to Kevin Martin in the quarterfinals.

Gushue won his 10th provincial championship at the 2013 Newfoundland and Labrador Tankard, defeating Colin Thomas in the final, 8–2. At the 2013 Tim Hortons Brier, his rink made the playoffs again after an 8-3 round robin record. However, the team would lose in the 3v4 Page Playoff game against Northern Ontario (Brad Jacobs), and then they would fall again in the bronze medal game to Ontario's Glenn Howard, settling for 4th place. The team finished the season at the 2013 Players' Championship, going 2–2 in pool play, and beat Kevin Koe in a tiebreaker before losing to Howard again in the quarterfinals.

The rink had a strong start to the 2013–14 curling season, winning the 2013 Baden Masters and the 2013 Challenge Chateau Cartier de Gatineau. The team then played in the 2013 Canadian Olympic Curling Trials – Road to the Roar and just missed out on advancing to the 2013 Canadian Olympic Curling Trials, losing to the eventual Olympic gold medallist Brad Jacobs rink in the final qualifying game. He would still be at the Olympic Trials as the alternate for Kevin Martin's team, winning a bronze medal as the alternate. Immediately after the Pre-Trials, Team Gushue played in the 2013 Canadian Open of Curling. The team went 3–2 in group play, and made it to the final before losing to Kevin Koe.

Gushue won the 2014 Newfoundland and Labrador Tankard again, defeating Colin Thomas in the final for the second straight year. At the 2014 Tim Hortons Brier, Gushue missed the playoffs for the 2nd time in 3 Briers, posting a 6–5 record. The team rebounded at The National which was held a week later. There, the team went 4–1 in pool play, and made it to the final where they lost to Glenn Howard. A month later, the team finished the season at the 2014 Players' Championship. They went 4–1 again in pool play, but lost in the semifinals to Brad Jacobs.

==== Nichols returns: 2014–2021 ====
In April 2014, it was announced that Mark Nichols would be returning to the team. He had been playing for Team Jeff Stoughton whose team broke up. Nichols replaced Casey on Team Gushue, with Casey returning to PEI to skip his own team.

In their first Slam with Nichols back, Team Gushue went 3–1 in pool play at the 2014 Masters, before downing Jeff Stoughton, John Epping and finally Mike McEwen in the final to claim his second career Slam title. In the final, Gushue and McEwen traded four-enders, but a draw for two in the seventh for Gushue was the turning point, as he ran McEwen out of stones in eighth to win the game, 8–6. The team missed the playoffs at The National that season (finishing 2–3), and missed the playoffs at the 2014 Canada Cup of Curling (going 3–3). The team then won the 2014 Canadian Open of Curling (over the hometown Steve Laycock rink in the final) to win 2 Grand Slam events in the same season for the first time of his career. In the game, Gushue had to come from behind three times to win the game after scoring two in the final end.

At the 2015 Tim Hortons Brier, Gushue would have a great round-robin, finishing 2nd at 9–2, including making the shot of the week to win in an extra end against Alberta. Said shot earned him an appearance on TSN SportsCentre's "1v1" segment and ultimately became the first athlete to retire as 1v1 Champion, winning the fan vote ten times in a row against other spectacular plays in the world of sports. In the playoffs, Gushue would lose both the 1v2 game to the 2014 Olympic and 2013 Brier Champion, Brad Jacobs, and the semifinal to eventual winner Pat Simmons. In the bronze medal game against Steve Laycock's Saskatchewan team, Gushue would lose in an extra end when he missed a difficult runback shot. At the 2015 GSOC Tour Challenge, the team turned heads when they debuted a new sweeping technique with just one sweeper, as opposed to the traditional two. This was a result of adopting new brush heads which could dramatically alter the trajectory of rocks. These innovations ultimately resulted in the "broomgate" scandal of the 2015–16 season.

Gushue won the Ford Hot Shots skills competition at the 2016 Tim Hortons Brier. He finally made his second Brier final nine years after his loss to Glenn Howard in the 2007 Brier final, advancing by defeating his longtime nemesis Brad Jacobs in the 1v2 game, but as the favourite would fall to Kevin Koe who had come all the way from the 3v4 game. Both teams curled strongly in the final, with Team Gushue at 91% and Team Koe at 94%, but the main difference was at skip position, where Brad was a disappointing 81% vs the near-perfect 96% of Kevin Koe.

Gushue would have another great season in 2015–2016, where he won The National over Reid Carruthers in the final, the Elite 10 also over Reid Carruthers in the final, and the Players Championships over Brad Jacobs in the final, both completing his career Grand Slam and being the first to win 3 Grand Slam events in the same season since Kevin Martin in the 2006–2007 season. This season featured 7 Grand Slam events for the first time in history, after having been 5 in 2014–2015 and 4 every other prior year in the history of the Grand Slam events.

In 2017 he played the Brier in his home province, and there was high hype for him to finally break the 41-year-old drought since the last Newfoundland Brier win and, at long last, win his first Brier after numerous near misses. The previous Brier winners, Jack MacDuff and his teammates from 1976, were in the crowd during the Opening Ceremonies. Starting in shaky form at 3–2 with losses to both Mike McEwen and shockingly, the Northwest Territories (whose win over Gushue would be their only win of the entire round robin), Gushue found his form thereafter and reeled off six consecutive wins to end up at a 9–2 record and 2nd place after the round robin. For the third time in his career, he would advance to the final by virtue of winning the 1v2 Page Playoff game, this time over Mike McEwen who had come into the playoffs as the No. 1 seed (with an identical 9–2 record, broken by virtue of his round robin win over Gushue). In a rematch of the 2016 final, he would face Kevin Koe (now representing Team Canada), who, just as in 2016, had come through the 3–4 game to the final and who had overcome a big deficit (5-3 without hammer) in beating Mike McEwen in the semifinals. In the final, starting with near-flawless play, Gushue would jump to a 5–1 lead. However, the team began to struggle slightly, compared to Team Canada, and with Team Koe curling better in the second half of the game, managing to tie the game in the 9th, at 6-6. On his final shot of the 10th end, Gushue nearly came up short in a draw shot, needing to hit the 8 foot to win, but his sweepers were able to get it there for him to finally win his first Brier with a 7–6 triumph. By winning the 2017 Tim Hortons Brier, Gushue also earned the right to represent Canada at the 2017 Ford World Men's Curling Championship. The team finished in first place by going undefeated in round robin play with an 11–0 record. They defeated team Sweden, skipped by Niklas Edin in the page playoff 1v2 game by a score of 7–4. Once again, they defeated Sweden, this time by a score of 4–2, in the gold medal game to claim the World title. Their performance at the World's earned them a spot in the 2017 Canadian Olympic Curling Trials.

Gushue won his 7th Grand Slam at the 2017 Meridian Canadian Open with an 8–3 win over the 2-time World Champion Niklas Edin of Sweden.

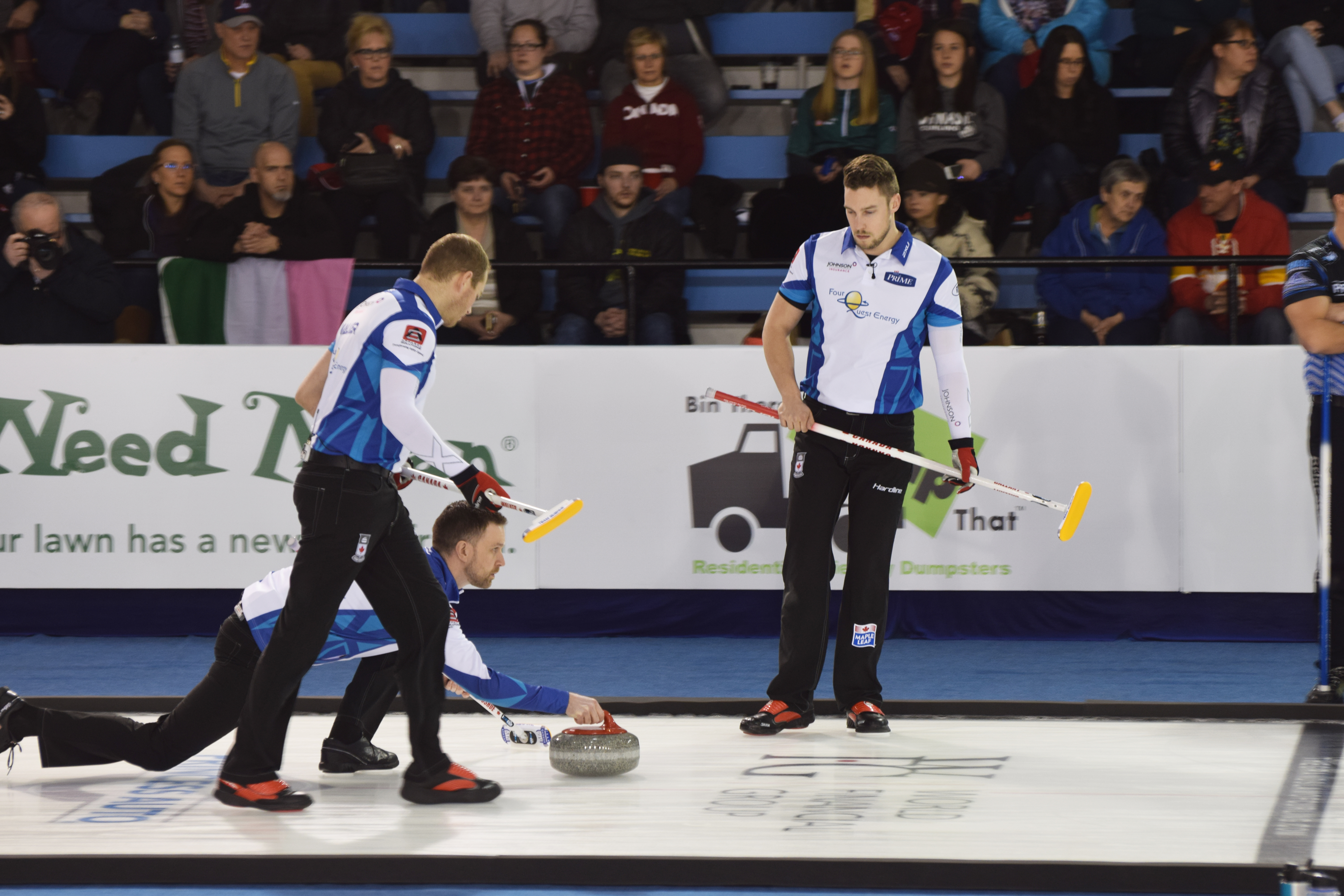
Brad Gushue makes a delivery at the 2018 Elite 10 event.

On March 5, 2018, early in the 2018 Tim Hortons Brier, Gushue skipped the 114th win of his Brier career, breaking a three-way tie for the most Brier game wins as a skip with previous record-holders Russ Howard and Kevin Martin. His first victory occurred on March 1, 2003, 15 years earlier. Gushue, who was skipping Team Canada as defending champions would go on to win the event, claiming his second straight Brier title.

He teamed up with Val Sweeting at the 2018 Canadian Mixed Doubles Curling Olympic Trials, finishing as runner-up.

Gushue once again represented Canada at the 2018 World Men's Curling Championship. They finished the round robin with a 9–3 record. In the playoffs, they knocked off the United States and Scotland to make it to the final, where they faced Sweden's Edin rink in a rematch of the 2017 final. This time, Edin got the better of Gushue, defeating Canada 7–3.

Gushue won his eighth career Slam by winning the 2017 GSOC Tour Challenge over Slam-newcomers Steffen Walstad's rink from Norway. He won the next event, the 2017 Masters of Curling, defeating Edin in the final. He won his 10th slam at the end of the season, defeating Glenn Howard at the 2018 Humpty's Champions Cup. The following season, he won the 2018 Elite 10, defeating Carruthers in the final.

Gushue represented Team Canada once again at the 2019 Tim Hortons Brier. After finishing the round robin with a 9–2 record, the team lost the 3v4 Page Playoff game to Team Wild Card, skipped by Brendan Bottcher. The loss forced Gushue to play in the Newfoundland and Labardor Tankard for the first time since 2017. He won the Tankard for the 15th time and represented his province at the 2020 Tim Hortons Brier. Gushue led his rink to an 8–3 record at the Brier. He won three straight games in the playoffs to claim his third Brier championship, defeating Bottcher (skipping Team Alberta) in the final. It would be Gushue's last game for nearly eight months, as the season was cut short due to the COVID-19 pandemic, forcing the 2020 World Men's Curling Championship (which he qualified for as Brier champion) to be cancelled.

In 2020, Gushue played with his eldest daughter Hayley at the Newfoundland and Labrador mixed doubles championship. The duo made it to the final, earning the silver medal. He would team up with his youngest daughter, Marissa, for the 2024 mixed doubles championship. They would also make the final, earning him another provincial silver medal.

Despite not being able to represent Canada at the World Men's Curling Championship in 2020 due to the COVID-19 pandemic, Team Gushue was designated as Team Canada at the 2021 Tim Hortons Brier, which was held Behind closed doors in a centralized "bubble" in Calgary, Alberta. After going 6–2 in the round robin, Team Gushue split their games in the championship pool, finishing with an 8–4 record and not advancing to the playoffs for the first time since 2014.

Gushue did not win another Slam until 2021, winning The National by defeating Scotland's Bruce Mouat in the final

==== 2022 Winter Olympics ====
Gushue's team qualified as the Canadian representatives for the 2022 Winter Olympics by winning the 2021 Canadian Olympic Curling Trials, defeating Brad Jacobs 4–3 in the final. The team would go onto win the bronze medal.

==== Gushue's Last Olympic Run: 2022–2026 ====
Due to having represented Canada at the 2022 Winter Olympics, Team Gushue got to bypass the Newfoundland and Labrador playdowns that year, and were allowed to play as the Wild Card #1 team at the 2022 Tim Hortons Brier. There, the team went through the pool play undefeated, but lost to Team Canada (skipped by Brendan Bottcher) in the championship round. This did not eliminate them however, and the team won all three of their games in the page playoffs, including winning the final against Alberta's Kevin Koe. This gave Gushue his fourth career Brier title, equalling the most ever for a skip with Ernie Richardson, Randy Ferbey, and Kevin Martin.

Gushue won his 13th Slam at the end of that season, defeating Koe in the final of the 2022 Champions Cup.

In 2022, Gushue announced that their second Brett Gallant would be departing the team due to him moving out of Newfoundland. Gushue won his 14th Slam at the 2022 National, defeating Niklas Edin in the final. As defending champions, Gushue represented Team Canada at the 2023 Tim Hortons Brier with new second E. J. Harnden replacing Brett Gallant. The team lost just one game in pool play, and then won all three of their playoff games to claim the championship, where they beat Manitoba, skipped by Matt Dunstone. It was Gushue's fifth Brier title, a record for skips.

Gushue and company again represented Canada at the 2024 Montana's Brier. The team had a shakier start than in previous years, going 6–2 in pool play, losing to the Northwest Territories (Jamie Koe) and the host Saskatchewan team, skipped by Mike McEwen. The team swept the playoffs however, including winning the final against Saskatchewan in a re-match. It was Gushue's sixth Brier title, tying a record held by Randy Ferbey and Gushue's teammates Mark Nichols and Geoff Walker. Gushue won his 15th Slam at the 2024 Players' Championship, beating Joel Retornaz of Italy in the final.

Prior to the 2025–26 curling season, Gushue shared via a post on Team Gushue's social media that the season would be his final year in competitive curling, focusing this season on the two major events held in his home region of Atlantic Canada; the Canadian Olympic Curling Trials in Halifax, and the Brier in St. John's. Gushue started the season at the 2025 Canadian Olympic Curling Trials, where Gushue would finish 4–3 after the round-robin, just missing out on the playoffs due to their head to head record against Matt Dunstone. Team Gushue would have a successful season on the Grand Slam of Curling tour as they prepared for Gushue's final Brier, finishing in the quarterfinals of the 2025 Tour Challenge and 2025 Canadian Open. At the 2026 Montana's Brier the event was billed as a "swan song" for Gushue, who would be playing in his final Brier on home ice, representing Newfoundland and Labrador. At the Brier, Gushue would finish the round robin with a perfect 8–0 record, qualifying for the Championship Round. However, Gushue's run would end in the 3v4 game, losing to reigning Olympic Gold Medalist Brad Jacobs 7–5, finishing 4th.

== Grand Slam record ==
Key
C	Champion
F	Lost in Final
SF	Lost in Semifinal
QF	Lost in Quarterfinals
R16	Lost in the round of 16
Q	Did not advance to playoffs
T2	Played in Tier 2 event
DNP	Did not participate in event
N/A	Not a Grand Slam event that season

Event	2001–02	2002–03	2003–04	2004–05	2005–06	2006–07	2007–08	2008–09	2009–10	2010–11	2011–12	2012–13	2013–14	2014–15	2015–16	2016–17	2017–18	2018–19	2019–20	2020–21	2021–22	2022–23	2023–24	2024–25	2025–26
Masters	Q	DNP	DNP	DNP	DNP	Q	Q	SF	SF	QF	QF	Q	DNP	C	QF	DNP	C	QF	F	N/A	SF	QF	QF	Q	Q
Tour Challenge	N/A	N/A	N/A	N/A	N/A	N/A	N/A	N/A	N/A	N/A	N/A	N/A	N/A	N/A	F	DNP	C	QF	F	N/A	N/A	SF	SF	F	QF
The National	DNP	DNP	DNP	Q	QF	QF	Q	F	C	Q	SF	QF	F	Q	C	SF	QF	QF	SF	N/A	C	C	Q	QF	DNP
Canadian Open	DNP	DNP	DNP	Q	Q	Q	Q	QF	Q	Q	Q	QF	F	C	F	C	Q	SF	SF	N/A	N/A	SF	SF	F	QF
Players'	DNP	Q	Q	F	Q	Q	Q	QF	F	DNP	Q	QF	SF	QF	C	SF	SF	QF	N/A	F	SF	SF	C	Q	DNP
Champions Cup	N/A	N/A	N/A	N/A	N/A	N/A	N/A	N/A	N/A	N/A	N/A	N/A	N/A	N/A	SF	QF	C	QF	N/A	SF	C	F	N/A	N/A	N/A
Elite 10	N/A	N/A	N/A	N/A	N/A	N/A	N/A	N/A	N/A	N/A	N/A	N/A	N/A	QF	C	Q	F	C	N/A	N/A	N/A	N/A	N/A	N/A	N/A

== Personal life ==
Gushue is the son of Ray and Maureen and began curling in 1993. In his youth, he also played golf, baseball and ice hockey. He was one of the province's top junior golfers, winning the Newfoundland and Labrador Junior Golf Championship from 1996 to 1999, two Newfoundland and Labrador School Championships with his school's golf team, and won the men's provincial amateur championship in 1999. Gushue is currently a business owner, co-owning an Orangetheory Fitness Studio in St. John's with teammate Mark Nichols. Gushue married Krista Tibbo on September 8, 2006. They have two children, Hayley and Marissa.

In 2006, Gushue co-authored a book with Alex J. Walling titled Golden Gushue: a Curling Story, which offers a behind-the-scenes look at the rise of his team to Olympic gold.

Gushue is ambidextrous — while he curls and golfs right-handed, he writes with his left hand.

Gushue attended O'Donel high school in Mount Pearl. He has a Bachelor of Business Administration from Memorial University and completed a Master of Business Administration from Queen's University in 2022. After his retirement from professional curling in 2026, Gushue now works as the high-performance director for USA Curling, providing administrative and coaching support of the American teams in international tournaments, and overseeing all high-profile American teams throughout the season.

== Teams ==
Season	Skip	Third	Second	Lead
1994–95	Ryan Davis	Brett Reynolds	Brad Gushue	Colin Josephson
1995–96	Brad Gushue	Randy Turpin	Brett Reynolds	Colin Josephson
1996–97	Brad Gushue	Randy Turpin	Jamie Korab	Brett Reynolds
1997–98	Brad Gushue	Ryan Davis	Jason Davidge	Brett Reynolds
1998–99	Brad Gushue	Mark Nichols	Neal Blackmore	Steve Parsons
1999–00	Brad Gushue	Mark Nichols	Jamie Korab	Mike Adam
2000–01	Brad Gushue	Mark Nichols	Brent Hamilton	Mike Adam
2001–02	Brad Gushue	Mark Nichols	Paul Harvey	Gene Trickett
2002–03	Brad Gushue	Mark Nichols	Jamie Korab	Mark Ward
2003–04	Brad Gushue	Mark Nichols	Jamie Korab	Mark Ward
2004–05	Brad Gushue	Mark Nichols	Keith Ryan	Jamie Korab
2005–06	Brad Gushue	Mark Nichols	Mike Adam; Russ Howard (skip)	Jamie Korab
2006–07	Brad Gushue	Mark Nichols	Chris Schille	Jamie Korab
2007–08	Brad Gushue	Mark Nichols	Chris Schille	David Noftall
2008–09	Brad Gushue	Mark Nichols	Ryan Fry	Jamie Korab
2009–10	Brad Gushue	Mark Nichols	Ryan Fry	Jamie Korab
2010–11 (Note: Ferbey left team mid-season)	Brad Gushue	Randy Ferbey (skip)	Mark Nichols	Ryan Fry
2011	Brad Gushue	Mark Nichols	Ryan Fry	Jamie Danbrook
2011–12	Brad Gushue	Ryan Fry	Geoff Walker	Adam Casey
2012	Brad Gushue	Ryan Fry	Adam Casey	Geoff Walker
2012–13	Brad Gushue	Brett Gallant	Adam Casey	Geoff Walker
2013–14	Brad Gushue	Brett Gallant	Adam Casey	Geoff Walker
2014–15	Brad Gushue	Mark Nichols	Brett Gallant	Geoff Walker
2015–16	Brad Gushue	Mark Nichols	Brett Gallant	Geoff Walker
2016–17	Brad Gushue	Mark Nichols	Brett Gallant	Geoff Walker
2017–18	Brad Gushue	Mark Nichols	Brett Gallant	Geoff Walker
2018–19	Brad Gushue	Mark Nichols	Brett Gallant	Geoff Walker
2019–20	Brad Gushue	Mark Nichols	Brett Gallant	Geoff Walker
2020–21	Brad Gushue	Mark Nichols	Brett Gallant	Joel Krats (Note: Krats replaced Walker in the 2020 Dave Jones Mayflower Cashspiel.); Ryan McNeil Lamswood (Note: McNeil Lamswood replaced Walker in the 2020 Stu Sells 1824 Halifax Classic.); Geoff Walker
2021–22	Brad Gushue	Mark Nichols	Brett Gallant	Geoff Walker
2022–23	Brad Gushue	Mark Nichols	E. J. Harnden	Geoff Walker
2023–24	Brad Gushue	Mark Nichols	E. J. Harnden	Geoff Walker
2024–25	Brad Gushue	Mark Nichols	E. J. Harnden (Sept.–Oct.); Brendan Bottcher (since Oct.)	Geoff Walker
2025–26	Brad Gushue	Mark Nichols	Brendan Bottcher	Geoff Walker

== Awards ==
- Canadian Junior Curling Championships: All-Star Skip - 2000 and 2001
- Brier: First Team All-Star, Skip - 2004, 2017, 2018, 2021 and 2022
- Brier: Second Team All-Star, Skip - 2010, 2013, 2015, 2016, 2019, 2023, 2024, 2025 and 2026
- Brier: Hec Gervais Most Valuable Player Award - 2017, 2018, 2020, 2022, 2023 and 2024
- World Men's Curling Championship: All-Star Skip - 2017, 2023 and 2024
