= Mark Nichols (curler) =

Canadian curler (born 1980)

- Curler
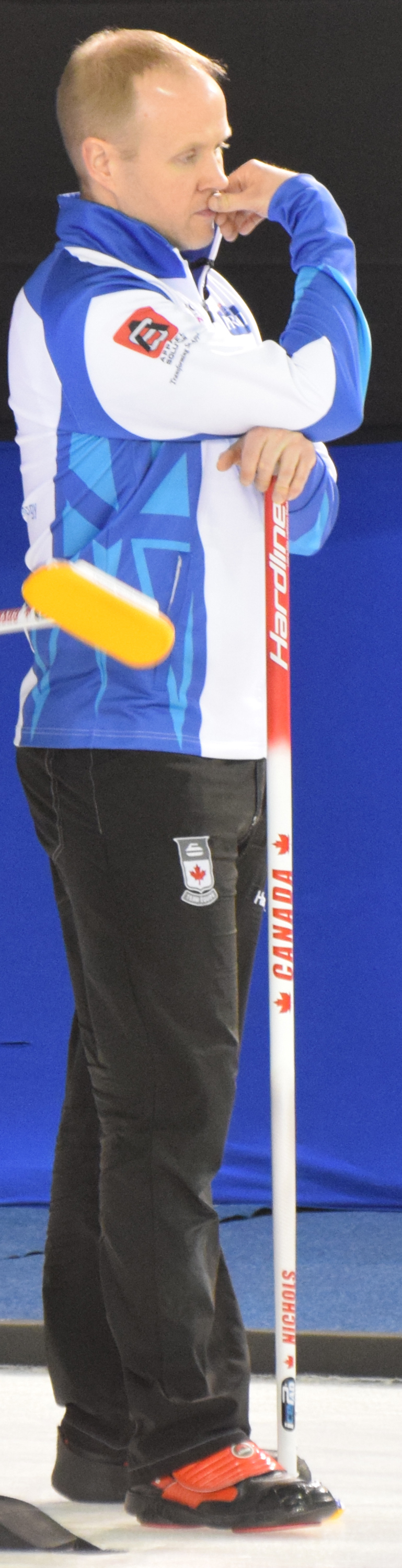
- Mark Nichols at the March 2018 Elite 10 in Winnipeg, Manitoba.
- Born: January 1, 1980 (age 46); Labrador City, Newfoundland, Canada
- Height: 177 cm (5 ft 10 in)

Team
- Curling club: St. John's CC, St. John's, NL
- Skip: Matt Dunstone
- Third: Colton Lott
- Second: Mark Nichols
- Lead: Ryan Harnden

Curling career
- Member Association: Newfoundland and Labrador (1995–2012; 2014–2026); Manitoba (2012–2014; 2026–present)
- Brier: 22 (2003, 2004, 2005, 2007, 2008, 2009, 2010, 2011, 2013, 2014, 2015, 2016, 2017, 2018, 2019, 2020, 2021, 2022, 2023, 2024, 2025, 2026)
- World Championship: 5 (2017, 2018, 2022, 2023, 2024)
- Pan Continental Championship: 3 (2022, 2023, 2024)
- Olympic: 2 (2006, 2022)
- Top CTRS ranking: 1st (2012–13, 2016–17, 2017–18, 2021–22, 2022–23, 2023–24)
- Grand Slam victories: 16 (2010 National (Jan.), 2013 National, 2014 Masters, 2014 Canadian Open, 2015 National, 2016 Elite 10, 2016 Players', 2017 Canadian Open, 2017 Tour Challenge, 2017 Masters, 2018 Champions Cup, 2018 Elite 10 (Sept.), 2021 National, 2022 Champions Cup, 2022 National, 2024 Players')
Medal record
Men's curling
Representing Canada
Winter Olympics
Gold medal – first place	2006 Turin	Team
Bronze medal – third place	2022 Beijing	Team
World Championships
Gold medal – first place	2017 Edmonton
Silver medal – second place	2018 Las Vegas
Silver medal – second place	2022 Las Vegas
Silver medal – second place	2023 Ottawa
Silver medal – second place	2024 Schaffhausen
World Junior Championships
Gold medal – first place	2001 Ogden
Pan Continental Championships
Gold medal – first place	2022 Calgary
Gold medal – first place	2023 Kelowna
The Brier
Gold medal – first place	2018 Regina
Gold medal – first place	2023 London
Gold medal – first place	2024 Regina
Bronze medal – third place	2025 Kelowna
Representing Newfoundland and Labrador
Canadian Olympic Trials
Gold medal – first place	2005 Halifax
Gold medal – first place	2021 Saskatoon
Bronze medal – third place	2017 Ottawa
The Brier
Gold medal – first place	2017 St. John's
Gold medal – first place	2020 Kingston
Silver medal – second place	2007 Hamilton
Silver medal – second place	2016 Ottawa
Bronze medal – third place	2011 London
Representing Manitoba
The Brier
Silver medal – second place	2013 Edmonton
Bronze medal – third place	2014 Kamloops
Representing (Newfoundland and Labrador) Wild Card
The Brier
Gold medal – first place	2022 Lethbridge

Mark Nichols, ONL (born January 1, 1980) is a Canadian curler from St. John's, Newfoundland and Labrador. He currently plays second on Team Matt Dunstone He was the longtime third for Brad Gushue. Nichols is a former Olympic champion curler, having played third for Team Canada at the 2006 Winter Olympics, where the team won a gold medal. He also won a World Championship with Gushue in 2017.

== Career ==
Nichols was born in Labrador City, Newfoundland, the son of Gerry and Helen Nichols. Nichols began curling at the age of 3 in Labrador City. In 1995, he played for Newfoundland at the Canada Games, placing eighth.

Between 1999 and 2011, Nichols lived in St. John's, Newfoundland and Labrador, where he played third for the Brad Gushue rink. It was with Gushue that he represented Canada at the 2006 Winter Olympics. With Gushue, Nichols has been to three Canadian Junior Curling Championships (1999, 2000, and winning in 2001) and nineteen Briers (2003–2005, 2007–2011, 2015–2025). He also qualified for the 2013 and 2014 Brier with Manitoba's Jeff Stoughton rink. He also won the World Junior Curling Championships in 2001 with Gushue. He also won Gold in the 2006 Winter Olympic Games in Turin, at which he threw a spectacular shot - running back a guard onto another stone which picked another rock that was sitting in a dead zone - in the 6th end of the final against Finland, helping Canada to score 6. Certainly, one thing to aid their victory was that Nichols shot a blistering 97 percent in the gold medal final. "When he’s playing that way, we don’t lose very much," said Gushue. He is also the 2017 Tim Hortons Brier Champion, again as third for Gushue, defeating Kevin Koe 7–6 in the final, helping Gushue to win the Brier in his 14th appearance. This was an especially sweet victory for Nichols, who had lost 3 Brier finals previously- with Gushue to Glenn Howard in 2007, with Stoughton to Brad Jacobs in 2013, with Gushue to Kevin Koe in 2016. The 2017 Brier was also in St. John's, where the Gushue team is from. The team went undefeated at the 2017 World Men's Curling Championship, defeating Niklas Edin in the final. At the 2018 Brier, he went back-to-back as brier champion, but this time he was a member of Team Canada, defeating Brendan Bottcher of Alberta 6–4 with fellow skip Brad Gushue. At the 2018 World Men's Curling Championship, they would lose the final in a rematch against Sweden's Edin. They couldn't win three Briers in a row, losing the 3 vs. 4 game of the 2019 Tim Hortons Brier to Brendan Bottcher.

Nichols has won a career total of twelve Grand Slam of Curling events, ten with Gushue and two with Stoughton. He won his first at the 2010 The National (January), defeating Randy Ferbey in the final. He also won the National in 2013 and 2015. He won two Masters (2014, 2017), two Canadian Open's (2014, 2017), two Elite 10's (2016, 2018 (Sept.)) and one Tour Challenge, Players' Championship and Champions Cup.

He briefly retired from curling after the 2011 Brier, although he always suggested he might return at some point, which he did for the 2012–2013 season as Jeff Stoughton's lead. He would play two whole seasons with Jeff, winning a silver at the 2013 Brier, and in the middle of the 2013–2014 season, moved to throwing second stones for Jeff, missing the playoffs at the Canadian Olympic Trials, but winning a bronze at the 2014 Brier. He left the Stoughton rink to reunite with Brad after the 2014 Brier.

He won the Ford Hot Shots shot-making competition at the 2005 Brier, winning a two-year lease on a new Ford vehicle.

Nichols also skipped team Newfoundland and Labrador with sister Shelley, Brent Hamilton and Jennifer Guzzwell to a Canadian Mixed Curling Championship in 2005.

=== 2022 Winter Olympics ===
Nichol's team, skipped by Brad Gushue, qualified as the Canadian representatives for the 2022 Winter Olympics by winning the 2021 Canadian Olympic Curling Trials, defeating Brad Jacobs 4–3 in the final. The team would go onto win the bronze medal.

== Personal life ==
In 2005, he graduated with a bachelor's degree in kinesiology from the Memorial University of Newfoundland. He also received an honorary Doctor of Laws degree in 2006 and received a certification of Mac-Nutrition in 2021.

With Gushue, Nichols is the co-owner and personal trainer with Orangetheory Fitness in St. John's. In the summer of 2011, Nichols married his longtime girlfriend and fellow curler Colette Lemon. They have two children. In August 2011, Nichols ran for the Progressive Conservative nomination in the district of Labrador West, losing to Nick McGrath. His mother, Helen, competed for Newfoundland at the 1992 Scott Tournament of Hearts.

== Teams ==
Season	Skip	Third	Second	Lead
1998–99	Brad Gushue	Mark Nichols	Neal Blackmore	Steve Parsons
1999–00	Brad Gushue	Mark Nichols	Jamie Korab	Mike Adam
2000–01	Brad Gushue	Mark Nichols	Brent Hamilton	Mike Adam
2001–02	Brad Gushue	Mark Nichols	Paul Harvey	Gene Trickett
2002–03	Brad Gushue	Mark Nichols	Jamie Korab	Mark Ward
2003–04	Brad Gushue	Mark Nichols	Jamie Korab	Mark Ward
2004–05	Brad Gushue	Mark Nichols	Keith Ryan	Jamie Korab
2005–06	Brad Gushue (Fourth)	Mark Nichols	Mike Adam; Russ Howard (Skip)	Jamie Korab
2006–07	Brad Gushue	Mark Nichols	Chris Schille	Jamie Korab
2007–08	Brad Gushue	Mark Nichols	Chris Schille	David Noftall
2008–09	Brad Gushue	Mark Nichols	Ryan Fry	Jamie Korab
2009–10	Brad Gushue	Mark Nichols	Ryan Fry	Jamie Korab
2010–11 (Note: Ferbey left team mid-season)	Brad Gushue (Fourth)	Randy Ferbey (Skip)	Mark Nichols	Ryan Fry
2011	Brad Gushue	Mark Nichols	Ryan Fry	Jamie Danbrook
2012–13	Jeff Stoughton	Jon Mead	Reid Carruthers	Mark Nichols
2013–14	Jeff Stoughton	Jon Mead	Reid Carruthers	Mark Nichols
2013–14	Jeff Stoughton	Jon Mead	Mark Nichols	Reid Carruthers
2014–15	Brad Gushue	Mark Nichols	Brett Gallant	Geoff Walker
2015–16	Brad Gushue	Mark Nichols	Brett Gallant	Geoff Walker
2016–17 (Note: Gushue was injured at the beginning of the 2016–17 curling season, so Nichols moved up to skip, with Thomas, Spencer, and Simmons sparing at third at different events.)	Brad Gushue; Mark Nichols	Mark Nichols; Charley Thomas; Adam Spencer; Pat Simmons	Brett Gallant	Geoff Walker
2017–18	Brad Gushue	Mark Nichols	Brett Gallant	Geoff Walker
2018–19	Brad Gushue	Mark Nichols	Brett Gallant	Geoff Walker
2019–20	Brad Gushue	Mark Nichols	Brett Gallant	Geoff Walker
2020–21	Brad Gushue	Mark Nichols	Brett Gallant	Geoff Walker
2021–22	Brad Gushue	Mark Nichols	Brett Gallant	Geoff Walker
2022–23	Brad Gushue	Mark Nichols	E. J. Harnden	Geoff Walker
2023–24	Brad Gushue	Mark Nichols	E. J. Harnden	Geoff Walker
2024–25	Brad Gushue	Mark Nichols	E. J. Harnden (Sept.–Oct.); Brendan Bottcher (since Oct.)	Geoff Walker
2025–26	Brad Gushue	Mark Nichols	Brendan Bottcher	Geoff Walker
2026–27	Matt Dunstone	Colton Lott	Mark Nichols	Ryan Harnden

== Awards ==
- World Junior Curling Championships: All-Star Third - 2001
- Brier: First Team All-Star, Lead - 2013
- Brier: First Team All-Star, Second - 2014
- Brier: First Team All-Star, Third - 2018 and 2025
- Brier: Second Team All-Star, Third - 2004, 2016, 2017, 2022 and 2024
- World Men's Curling Championship: All-Star Third - 2017, 2018 and 2024
