= Geoff Walker (curler) =

Canadian curler (born 1985)

- Curler
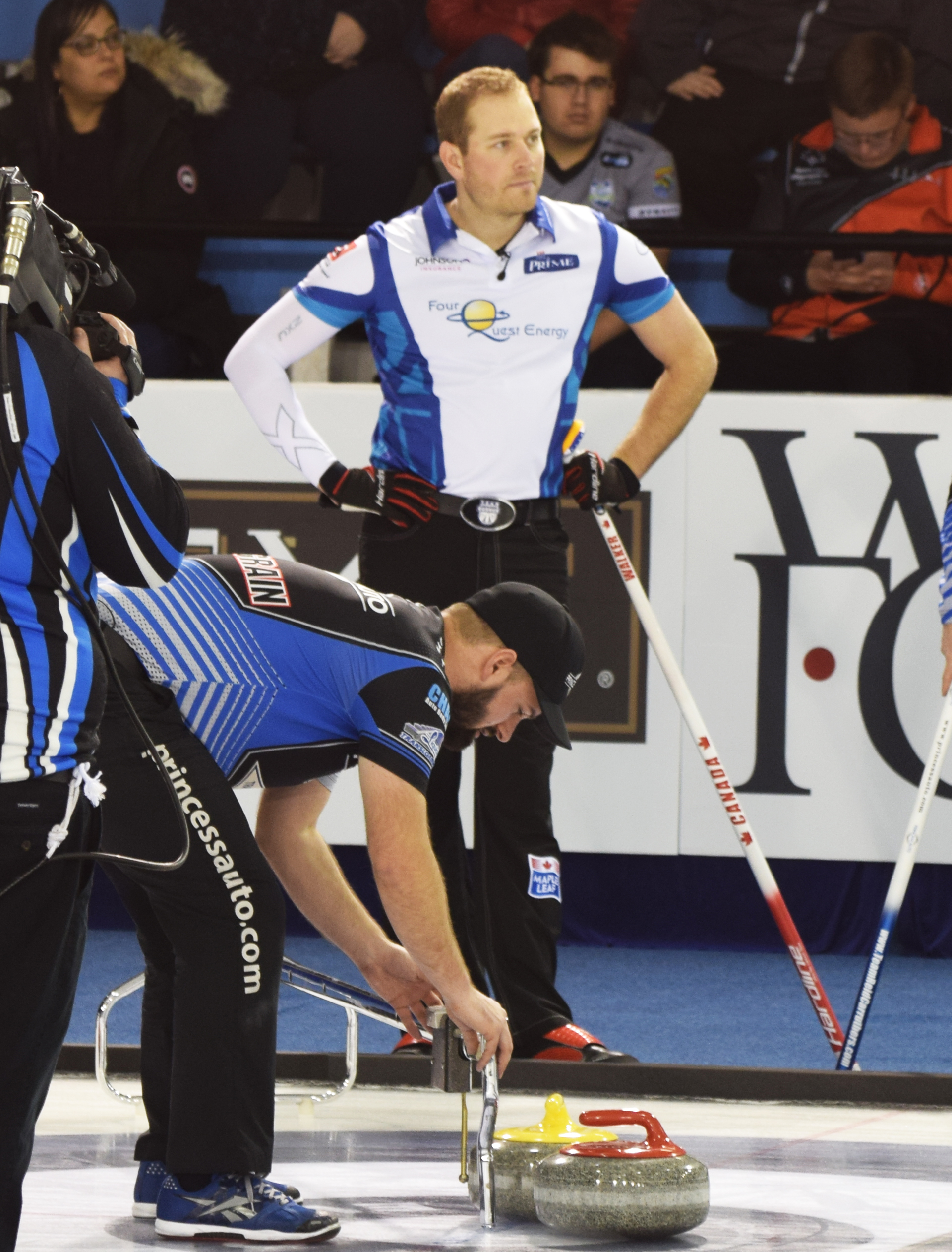
- Walker (rear) waits while Reid Carruthers measures a stone at the 2018 Elite 10.
- Born: November 28, 1985 (age 40); Beaverlodge, Alberta, Canada
- Height: 184 cm (6 ft 0 in)

Team
- Curling club: Saville Community SC, Edmonton, AB
- Skip: Brendan Bottcher
- Third: Jacob Horgan
- Second: Tanner Horgan
- Lead: Geoff Walker

Curling career
- Member Association: Alberta (2006–2011; 2026–present); Newfoundland and Labrador (2011–2026)
- Brier: 15 (2012, 2013, 2014, 2015, 2016, 2017, 2018, 2019, 2020, 2021, 2022, 2023, 2024, 2025, 2026)
- World Championship: 6 (2017, 2018, 2022, 2023, 2024, 2026)
- Pan Continental Championship: 3 (2022, 2023, 2024)
- Olympic: 1 (2022)
- Top CTRS ranking: 1st (2016–17, 2017–18, 2021–22, 2022–23, 2023–24)
- Grand Slam victories: 14 (2014 Masters, 2014 Canadian Open, 2015 National, 2016 Elite 10, 2016 Players', 2017 Canadian Open, 2017 Tour Challenge, 2017 Masters, 2018 Champions Cup, 2018 Elite 10 (Sept.), 2021 National, 2022 Champions Cup, 2022 National, 2024 Players')
Medal record
Men's curling
Representing Canada
Winter Olympics
Bronze medal – third place	2022 Beijing	Team
World Championships
Gold medal – first place	2017 Edmonton
Silver medal – second place	2018 Las Vegas
Silver medal – second place	2022 Las Vegas
Silver medal – second place	2023 Ottawa
Silver medal – second place	2024 Schaffhausen
Silver medal – second place	2026 Ogden
World Junior Championships
Gold medal – first place	2006 Jeonju
Gold medal – first place	2007 Eveleth
Pan Continental Championships
Gold medal – first place	2022 Calgary
Gold medal – first place	2023 Kelowna
The Brier
Gold medal – first place	2018 Regina
Gold medal – first place	2023 London
Gold medal – first place	2024 Regina
Bronze medal – third place	2025 Kelowna
Representing Newfoundland and Labrador
Canadian Olympic Trials
Gold medal – first place	2021 Saskatoon
Bronze medal – third place	2017 Ottawa
The Brier
Gold medal – first place	2017 St. John's
Gold medal – first place	2020 Kingston
Silver medal – second place	2016 Ottawa
Canadian Mixed Doubles Championships
Silver medal – second place	2016 Saskatoon
Representing (Newfoundland and Labrador) Wild Card
The Brier
Gold medal – first place	2022 Lethbridge

Geoff Walker (born November 28, 1985) is a Canadian curler, currently living in Edmonton, Alberta. He currently plays lead on Team Brendan Bottcher. He was the longtime lead for Brad Gushue. He was the 2022 Winter Olympics bronze medalist, 2017 World Champion and a six-time national champion (2017, 2018, 2020, 2022, 2023 and 2024). Walker was a two-time World Junior Champion when he won gold in 2006 and 2007.

== Career ==
Walker was born in Beaverlodge, Alberta, to Alan and Lorraine. He began curling at the age of 12. As a junior, Walker played for the Charley Thomas rink in Grande Prairie, Alberta. In 2006, the team won the Canadian and World Junior Curling Championships. Walker was too old to stay with the rink for the 2007 Canadian Junior Championships. He was invited to join the team after they won the event as their alternate for the 2007 World Junior Curling Championships. The World Juniors allows curlers to be one year older than the Canadian Juniors. As the alternate, Walker won his second straight World Junior Championship.

After Juniors, Walker joined the Kurt Balderston rink as his second. The team missed the playoffs at the 2008 Boston Pizza Cup (the Alberta provincial championship) but qualified for the playoffs at the 2009 Boston Pizza Cup, where they lost to James Pahl. After missing the playoffs again at the 2010 Boston Pizza Cup, Walker left the team to form his own rink. Walker would do well on his own and went all the way to the semifinal of the 2011 Boston Pizza Cup, where he lost to Kevin Koe.

After the 2010–11 season, Walker left Alberta to join the Brad Gushue rink in Newfoundland as his lead. The team won the 2012 Newfoundland and Labrador Tankard, earning the team a spot at the 2012 Tim Hortons Brier, Walker's first. The team finished in seventh with a 5–6 record. The team would win the provincial title the following year as well at the 2013 Newfoundland and Labrador Tankard. The team would make the playoffs at the 2013 Tim Hortons Brier with an 8–3 record. They would lose the 3 vs. 4 game to Northern Ontario's Brad Jacobs and the bronze medal game to Ontario's Glenn Howard. The Gushue rink failed to make the playoffs at the 2014 Tim Hortons Brier after going 6–5 in the round robin. They would improve on their best finish at the 2015 Tim Hortons Brier, where they lost in the semifinal to Team Canada, skipped by Pat Simmons. During the 2014–15 season, Walker would also win his first Grand Slam of Curling event, the 2014 Masters and the 2014 Canadian Open.

The Gushue rink would win three more slams during the 2015–16 season, the 2015 National, the 2016 Elite 10 and the 2016 Players' Championship. With their successful tour season, the team went into the 2016 Tim Hortons Brier as the number one seed. They led Newfoundland and Labrador to a 9–2 round robin record, earning them a spot in the 1 vs. 2 game. They would defeat Northern Ontario's Jacobs before losing to Alberta's Kevin Koe 9–5 in the final. The team finished second on the CTRS standings for the season, just behind the Koe rink.

Team Gushue added one more slam title during the 2016–17 season at the 2017 Canadian Open. The team would also have their most successful Brier to date at the 2017 Tim Hortons Brier, which was hosted in St. John's. They once again finished 9–2 in the round robin and would win the 1 vs. 2 game over Manitoba's Mike McEwen rink. Tied 6–6 in the final end of the final against Koe, Gushue needed to draw full eight foot to win the title. The team swept it all the way down the sheet, and the stone was just close enough for the win. It was Newfoundland's first Brier title since 1976. The team represented Canada at the 2017 World Men's Curling Championship, where they went undefeated en route to capturing the gold medal. The whole Canadian team was named the All-Star Team for the tournament. This would earn them first place on the CTRS standings for the season.

The team followed this successful season up with another great season for the 2017–18 season. It did come with a bit of heartbreak, though, as the team lost the semifinal of the 2017 Canadian Olympic Curling Trials. They shook this off, though, able to win three more slams, the 2017 Tour Challenge, the 2017 Masters, and the 2018 Humpty's Champions Cup. His rink would defend their title at the 2018 Tim Hortons Brier. Representing Team Canada, they went 10–1 through the round robin and championship pool and defeated Alberta's Brendan Bottcher 6–4 in the final. They would lose the final of the 2018 World Men's Curling Championship to Sweden's Niklas Edin team.

The team added a tenth slam title to their name at the 2018 Elite 10 (September) the following season. They would lose the 3 vs. 4 game of the 2019 Tim Hortons Brier to Bottcher's rink. On the tour, they lost in the finals of the China Open to Russia's Sergei Glukhov and the Stu Sells 1824 Halifax Classic to Scott Howard who was skipping the Glenn Howard team. They began their 2019–20 season at the 2019 AMJ Campbell Shorty Jenkins Classic, where they lost to eventual champions John Epping in the quarterfinals. They then lost in the semifinal of the Stu Sells Toronto Tankard to Brad Jacobs, who also went on to win the event. In Grand Slam play, the team didn't win any events but finished runner-up at both the 2019 Masters and the 2019 Tour Challenge and lost in the semifinals of the 2019 National and the 2020 Canadian Open. The team would win the 2020 Newfoundland and Labrador Tankard after not having to play in it for the previous two seasons. At the 2020 Tim Hortons Brier, the team finished 8–3, which qualified them for the 3 vs. 4 game. They would beat Brad Jacobs in the 3 vs. 4, Saskatchewan's Matt Dunstone in the semifinal, and Alberta's Bottcher rink in the final to win their third Brier title. The team was set to represent Canada once again at the 2020 World Men's Curling Championship before the event got cancelled due to the COVID-19 pandemic. The Brier would be their last event of the season as both the Players' Championship and the Champions Cup Grand Slam events were also cancelled due to the pandemic.

Team Gushue played in two events during the 2020–21 season, the Dave Jones Mayflower Cashspiel and the Stu Sells 1824 Halifax Classic, winning both. However, due to living in Alberta, Walker did not play in either event, as he was replaced by junior curlers Ryan McNeil Lamswood and Joel Krats. Representing Team Canada at the 2021 Tim Hortons Brier, they finished with an 8–4 record, not advancing to the playoffs for the first time since 2014.

=== 2022 Winter Olympics ===
Walker's team, skipped by Brad Gushue, qualified as the Canadian representatives by winning the 2021 Canadian Olympic Curling Trials, defeating Brad Jacobs 4–3 in the final. The team would go onto win the bronze medal.

== Personal life ==
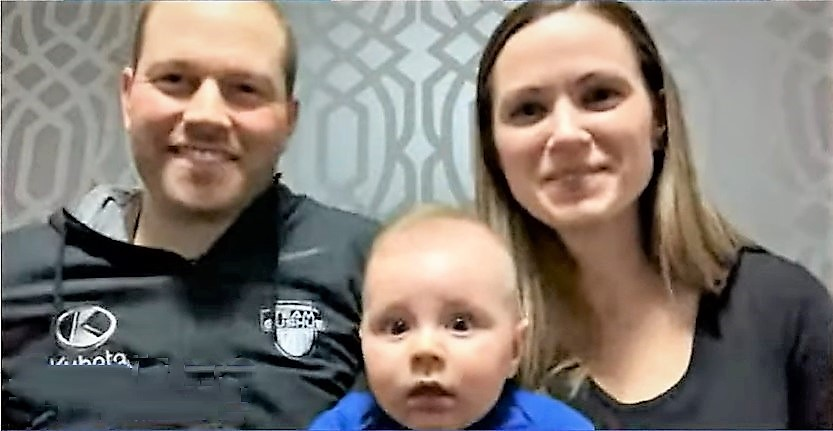
Geoff and Laura Walker with their son on CBC Sports "That Curling Show" in 2021

In his youth, Walker also played ice hockey and golf. Walker formerly worked for the turf team at The Derrick Golf & Winter Club in Edmonton. He is married to fellow curler Laura Walker, and they have two children. He attended Grande Prairie Regional College where he studied business administration for two years, before getting a job in insurance. Upon E. J. Harnden joining the team in 2022; it was announced that Walker would return to reside in Newfoundland and Labrador so that the team could continue to represent the province at the Brier. However, this did not ultimately happen and Curling Canada clarified its rules that as Team Canada, as long as the team had three returning players, they could still play in the 2023 Tim Hortons Brier regardless of residency.

His sister Stephanie Enright is also a curler. His cousins Matt, Darby and Greg Gatto are all professional ice hockey players.

== Awards ==
- Brier: First Team All-Star, Lead - 2026
- Brier: Second Team All-Star, Lead - 2017, 2018, 2023, 2024
- World Men's Curling Championship: All-Star Lead - 2017, 2018, 2023
