= Ontario Tankard =

Provincial men's curling championship

- Established: 1927
- 2027 host city: Cornwall, Ontario
- 2027 arena: Cornwall Civic Complex
- 2026 champion: Jayden King

Current edition
- 2026 Ontario Tankard

The Ontario Tankard, officially the Ontario Men's Provincial Championships, is the Southern Ontario provincial championship for men's curling. The winner represents Team Ontario at the Montana's Brier. The tournament is overseen by Curling Ontario (formerly the Ontario Curling Association).

Northern Ontario has its own provincial championship, known as the Northern Ontario Men's Provincial Curling Championship.

This championship is not to be confused with the Silver Tankard, historically also known as the Ontario Tankard (and until 1937 a Brier qualifier).

== Qualification ==
Since 2017, the qualification has varied from year to year:

- 2017: 10 teams total (Top two southern Ontario teams in the CTRS standings; Six teams from two regional qualifiers; Two teams from a challenge round).
- 2018: 12 teams total (Top two CTRS ranked teams; Six teams from two regional qualifiers; Three teams from a challenge round; And the Colts champion team).
- 2019: 10 teams total (Top three CTRS ranked teams; Five teams from three cash spiels; Two teams from an open qualifier).
- 2020: 9 teams total (Top three CTRS ranked teams; Four teams from two cash spiels; Two teams from an open qualifier).
- 2022: Originally 8 teams (Top two CTRS ranked teams; Top Trillium Tour series team; Two teams from a cash spiel; three from an open qualifier.) The open qualifier was cancelled due to the COVID-19 pandemic, so the top seven CTRS teams who had signed up for the qualifier were invited, expanding the number of entries in the tankard to 12.
- 2023: 12 teams total (Top 2 "Grand Slam series" teams; Top 2 "Trillium Tour '1,000' Series" teams; Top 3 "Trillium Tour '500' Series" teams; Top "Trillium Tour '250' Series (Under-25) team; Four teams from an open qualifier).
- 2024: 12 teams total (Top four CTRS ranked teams; Top four CTRS ranked teams from Ontario-only events; Four teams from an open qualifier).
- 2025–2026: 12 teams total (Top eight CTRS ranked teams; Four teams from an open qualifier).
- 2027: 8 teams total (Top 5 CTRS)

Between 1972 and 2016, the event usually had 10 teams: Two teams from each of the four OCA regions, and one winner each from an eastern and western challenge round. When Ontario won the previous Brier, that team would be added to the field for the following season. In 1999, when Ontario had not only won the previous Brier, but an Ontario team also won the 1997 Canadian Olympic Curling Trials, the field was expanded to 12 teams, giving them an automatic berth.

== Format ==
The event was separated from the Silver Tankard in 1938. From 1938 to 1953, the event was an eight team single elimination tournament, often held on a single day of competition. From 1954 to 1966, the event was an eight team round robin event, with the team having the best record qualifying for the Brier. In 1967, the event was expanded to a 16 team double knockout, further expanding to 18 teams in 1968.

In 1972, the event was reduced to 10 teams, and reverted to a round robin format, with the team with the best record being crowned champion (a tiebreaker would be held if necessary). This format lasted until 1981, when a three team playoff was added. In 2001, the playoff was replaced with a four team page playoff.

The format of the Tankard differed each year from 2018 to 2023:

- 2018: Triple knockout followed by a four team page playoff.
- 2019: Round robin followed by a four team page playoff.
- 2020: Round robin followed by a three-team playoff.
- 2022: Triple knockout followed by a four team page playoff.
- 2023: Round robin within two pools of six, followed by a four team championship round, followed by a three team playoff.

From 2024 to 2026, the event has been a triple knockout followed by a four team page playoff.

In 2027, the event will go to an eight-team round robin, with a three team playoff.

== Former Names ==
- Ontario Silver Tankard: 1927-1931
- 1932: Round robin playoff between the winners of the Ontario Tankard, Canada Life Trophy and the Toronto Bonspiel.
- 1933: Winner was decided between a playoff between the winners of the Ontario Tankard and the Toronto Bonspiel.
- Ontario Silver Tankard: 1934-1937
- British Consols: 1938-1979
- Labatt Tankard: 1980-1985
- Blue Light Tankard: 1986-1994
- Labatt Tankard: 1995
- Nokia Cup: 1996-2003
- Ontario Men's Curling Championship: 2004
- Kia Cup: 2005-2006
- TSC Stores Tankard: 2007-2009
- Ontario Men's Curling Championship: 2010
- The Dominion Tankard: 2011-2013
- Travelers Tankard: 2014
- Recharge with Milk Tankard: 2015-2017
- Dairy Farmers of Ontario Tankard: 2018
- Ontario Curling Championships: 2019–2020
- Port Elgin Chrysler Ontario Tankard: 2022–23
- Milk Every Moment Ontario Men's Curling Championship: 2024
- Men's Ontario Curling Championship: 2025
- Food & Farm Care Ontario Men's Provincial Championship: 2026

== Brier representatives ==
Listed below are the list of Ontario's representatives at the Brier that year. Brier champions indicated in bold. From 1927 to 1931, Toronto had a separate entry at the Brier.

=== 1927–1931 ===
From 1927 to 1931, teams representing Ontario at the Brier were selected from the winning club at the Ontario Silver Tankard, a double rink event which has taken place since 1875.

Brier	Brier representative team	Winning Club	City	Host site	Brier Rec.	Brier Finish
1927	Bob McKenzie, Bill Watson, Mel Hunt, Harry Watson	Sarnia Curling Club	Sarnia	Toronto	3-4	T4th
1928	Vic McWilliams, Ed Brower, John Brandon, Bob Hamilton	Granite Curling Club	Toronto	Toronto	6-3	4th
1929	Frank Carew, Walter Reesor, Frank Williams, Dick Butler	Lindsay Curling Club	Lindsay	Toronto	4-5	6th
1930	H.A. Bruce, Wesley Binkley, M.A. Humber, J.W. Lloyd	Stratford Curling Club	Stratford	Toronto	3-6	T9th
1931	Ed Brower, John Rennie, John Brower, Bob Hamilton	Granite Curling Club	Toronto	Toronto	7-3	2nd

=== 1932–1980 ===
There was no Brier from 1943 to 1945 due to World War II. Listed here for those years are the winners of the British Consols, the usual Brier qualifying event.

Brier	Champion team	Winning Club	City	Host site	Brier Rec.	Brier Finish
1932	Charles Bulley, John Brandon, Thomas Black, C.W. Defoe	Granite Curling Club	Toronto	Toronto	4-3	T3rd
1933	Gordon Campbell, Donnie Campbell, Gord Coates, Duncan Campbell	Thistle Curling Club	Hamilton	Toronto	6-2	2nd
1934	Gordon Campbell, Donnie Campbell, Gord Coates, Duncan Campbell	Thistle Curling Club	Hamilton	Toronto	5-2	2nd
**1935**	**Gordon Campbell, Donnie Campbell, Gord Coates, Duncan Campbell**	Thistle Curling Club	**Hamilton**	Toronto	**6-1**	**1st**
1936	Hector Cowan, William McCart, Alex Hayes, Murray Chilton	Sarnia Curling Club	Sarnia	Toronto	5-4	T5th
1937	Albert Dunker, Irwin Huntington, Arthur Lehnen, Fred Hasenflug	Granite Curling Club	Kitchener	Toronto	2-7	T7th
1938	Bert Hall, Percy Hall, Ernie Parkes, Campbell Seagram	Granite Curling Club	Kitchener	Toronto	4-5	T5th
**1939**	**Bert Hall, Percy Hall, Ernie Parkes, Campbell Seagram**	**Granite Curling Club**	**Kitchener**	Toronto	**9-1**	**1st**
1940	Bert Hall, Percy Hall, Ernie Parkes, Campbell Seagram	Granite Curling Club	Kitchener	Toronto	4-5	T5th
1941	Percy Hall, Jack Lucas, Arthur Lehnen, William Henderson, Jr.	Granite Curling Club	Kitchener	Toronto	7-2	2nd
1942	Gordon Campbell, Duncan Campbell, Bill Kennedy, Rufus Stone	Thistle Curling Club	Hamilton	Toronto	7-2	T2nd
1943	Ken Wadsworth, E. H. Pooler, C. H. Brereton, H. M. S. Parsons	Toronto Granite Club	Toronto	Toronto	cancelled	
1944	Percy Hall, Bert Hall, Arthur Lehnen, William Henderson, Jr.	Granite Curling Club	Kitchener	Toronto	cancelled	
1945	Percy Hall, Bert Hall, Arthur Lehnen, William Henderson, Jr.	Granite Curling Club	Kitchener	Toronto	cancelled	
1946	Percy Hall, Bert Hall, Arthur Lehnen, William Henderson, Jr.	Granite Curling Club	Kitchener	Toronto	5-4	T5th
1947	Nicol MacNicol, Edmond O'Donnell, Gordon Denison, Adam F. Spencer	Toronto Curling Club	Toronto	Toronto	3-6	8th
1948	Jack Patrick, Bill Meyer, Walter McGregor, Angus Oliver	Galt Curling Club	Galt	Hamilton	5-4	T4th
1949	Peter Gilbert, Gord Gilbert, Don Painter, John DeKoning	Chatham Granite Curling Club	Chatham	Toronto	5-4	4th
1950	Carl Asmussen, Larry Shantz, Cully Schmidt, Ed Shultz	Granite Curling Club	Kitchener	Kitchener	5-4	T4th
1951	Gordon Campbell, Stan Jones, Reg Mooney, Colin Campbell	Granite Curling Club	Toronto	Kingston	6-4	T5th
1952	Ralph Clark, Vic Brown, Ken Bissett, Burritt Harrison	Peterborough Curling Club	Peterborough	Toronto	6-4	T3rd
1953	Gord Gilbert, Bob Gilbert, Jim Harrington, Peter Gilbert (skip)	Chatham Granite Curling Club	Chatham	Toronto	4-6	8th
1954	Ross Tarleton, Bob Cross, Gord Wilson, Ernie Lock	Thistle Curling Club	Hamilton	Orillia	6-4	T3rd
1955	Andy Grant, Walter Derratt, Earl Hushagen, Ray Grant	Royal Canadian Curling Club	Toronto	Galt	7-3	3rd
1956	Alf Phillips, Sr., Reg Mooney, Stanley Jones, Bill Leak	Granite Curling Club	Toronto	Peterborough	8-3	2nd
1957	Stan Sarjeant, Roy Hewitt, Earl Lamb, Harry Tissington	Champlain Curling Club	Orillia	Kitchener	6-4	5th
1958	Murray Roberts, Andy Grant, Ray Grant, George Rumney	Unionville Curling Club	Unionville	Oshawa	7-3	3rd
1959	Ted Sellers, John Grant, Harold Lawrie, Carl Sellers	Unionville Curling Club	Unionville	Sarnia	6-4	T4th
1960	Jake Edwards, Bob Elliott, Joe Corkey, George Binnington	Kingston Curling Club	Kingston	Welland	7-3	4th
1961	Tom Caldwell, Ross Coward, Doc Behan, Frank Milligan	Champlain Curling Club	Orillia	Ottawa	5-5	T6th
1962	Bayne Secord, Vern Larsen, Russ Lindberg, Dave McDunough	Tam Heather Country Club	Agincourt	Owen Sound	6-4	5th
1963	Bob Mann, Ken Buchan, Keith Munro, Rich Palmer	Hanover Curling Club	Hanover	Hamilton	6-4	T4th
1964	Bob Mann, Ken Buchan, Keith Munro, Rich Palmer	Hanover Curling Club	Hanover	Niagara Falls	5-5	T5th
1965	Ray Grant, Keith Jewett, Ray McGee, Al Claney	Unionville Curling Club	Unionville	Cobourg	5-5	T5th
1966	Joe Gurowka, Tom Howat, Ken Ingo, Don Mackey	Dixie Curling Club	Cooksville	Brampton	8-3	2nd
**1967**	**Alf Phillips, Jr., John Ross, Ron Manning, Keith Reilly**	**Parkway Curling Club**	**Toronto**	Orillia	**9-1**	**1st**
1968	Don Gilbert, Al Zikman, Jimmy Waite, Dick Donald	St. Thomas Curling Club	St. Thomas	Kingston	6-4	T4th
1969	Ken Buchan, Garry Weisz, Mitch Czaja, Ross Guest	London Curling Club	London	London	2-8	T9th
1970	Paul Savage, Tom Cushing, Jerry Downer, Dave Phillips	Terrace Curling Club	Toronto	Oshawa	4-6	T6th
1971	Bob Charlebois, Rich Palmer, Ray Lilly, Jim McGrath	Avonlea Curling Club	Don Mills	Guelph	5-5	T4th
1972	Eldon Coombe, Keith Forgues, Jim Patrick, Barry Provost	Ottawa Curling Club	Ottawa	Gloucester	6-4	T3rd
1973	Paul Savage, Bob Thomson, Ed Werenich, Ron Green	Scarboro Golf & Country Club	Scarborough	Orillia	6-4	T2nd
1974	Paul Savage, Bob Thomson, Ed Werenich, Ron Green	Scarboro Golf & Country Club	Scarborough	East York	6-4	T3rd
1975	Alex Scott, Ted Brown, Mike Boyd, Tom Miller	Cataraqui Golf and Country Club	Kingston	Cambridge	6-5	T5th
1976	Joe Gurowka, Bob Charlebois, Ray Lilly, Jim McGrath	Dixie Curling Club	Mississauga	Peterborough	3-8	T10th
1977	Paul Savage, Ed Werenich, Ron Green, Reid Ferguson	Avonlea Curling Club	Don Mills	Brantford	8-3	T2nd
1978	Gerry Hodson, Barry Paterson, Glen Webster, Ross Guest	London Curling Club	London	St. Catharines	4-7	10th
1979	Bob Fedosa, Bob Turcotte, Craig Garratt, Doug Morrison	Annandale Country Club	Ajax	St. Thomas	6-5	T4th
1980	Russ Howard, Larry Merkley, Robert Ruston, Kent Carstairs	Penetanguishene Curling Club	Penetanguishene	Brampton	5-6	T6th

=== 1981–present ===
A playoff was added to the event in 1981. The 2021 Tankard was cancelled due to the COVID-19 pandemic in Ontario.

Brier	Champion team	Winning Club	City	Host site	Runner-up skip (club)	Brier Rec.	Brier Finish
1981	Ed Werenich, Bob Widdis, Neil Harrison, Jim McGrath	Avonlea Curling Club	Don Mills	Markham	Ron Manning (Keene)	7-5	4th
1982	Bruce Munro, Bob Laidlaw, Clive Bowden, Bruce Paterson	Forest City Curling Club	London	Brantford	Dave Walker (Avonlea)	5-6	T6th
**1983**	**Ed Werenich, Paul Savage, John Kawaja, Neil Harrison**	**Avonlea Curling Club**	**Don Mills**	Burlington	Bill Walsh (Navy)	**11-1**	**1st**
1984	Ed Werenich, Paul Savage, John Kawaja, Neil Harrison	Avonlea Curling Club	Don Mills	Peterborough	Bob Turcotte (Oshawa)	10-5	2nd
1985	Earle Morris, Lovel Lord, Dave Merklinger, Bill Fletcher	RCN (Navy) Curling Club	Ottawa	Kingston	Jim Sharples (Dixie)	5-6	T7th
1986	Russ Howard, Glenn Howard, Tim Belcourt, Kent Carstairs	Penetanguishene Curling Club	Penetanguishene	Richmond Hill	Wayne Tallon (Navy)	10-3	2nd
**1987**	**Russ Howard, Glenn Howard, Tim Belcourt, Kent Carstairs**	**Penetanguishene Curling Club**	**Penetanguishene**	Chatham	Ed Werenich (Avonlea)	**10-2**	**1st**
1988	Paul Savage, Ed Werenich, Graeme McCarrel, Neil Harrison	Avonlea Curling Club	Don Mills	Nepean	Russ Howard (Penetanguishene)	8-4	3rd
1989	Russ Howard, Glenn Howard, Tim Belcourt, Kent Carstairs	Penetanguishene Curling Club	Penetanguishene	Trenton	Ed Werenich (Avonlea)	8-4	3rd
**1990**	**Ed Werenich, John Kawaja, Ian Tetley, Pat Perroud**	**Avonlea Curling Club**	**Don Mills**	Chatham	Bob Fedosa (Brampton)	**11-1**	**1st**
1991	Russ Howard, Glenn Howard, Wayne Middaugh, Peter Corner	Penetanguishene Curling Club	Penetanguishene	Owen Sound	Kirk Ziola (Highland)	6-5	T5th
1992; Details	Russ Howard, Glenn Howard, Wayne Middaugh, Peter Corner	Penetanguishene Curling Club	Penetanguishene	Nepean	Mike Harris (Tam Heather)	9-4	2nd
**1993**; Details	**Russ Howard, Glenn Howard, Wayne Middaugh, Peter Corner**	**Penetanguishene Curling Club**	**Penetanguishene**	Trenton	Mike Harris (Tam Heather)	**11-3**	**1st**
1994; Details	Russ Howard, Glenn Howard, Wayne Middaugh, Peter Corner	Penetanguishene Curling Club	Penetanguishene	St. Thomas	Axel Larsen (Guelph)	9-4	2nd
1995; Details	Ed Werenich, John Kawaja, Pat Perroud, Neil Harrison	Avonlea Curling Club	Don Mills	Kingston	Russ Howard (Penetanguishene)	8-5	4th
1996; Details	Bob Ingram, Larry Smyth, Robert Rumfeldt, Jim Brackett	Ridgetown Curling Club	Ridgetown	Pickering	Russ Howard (MacTier)	4-7	T9th
1997; Details	Ed Werenich, John Kawaja, Pat Perroud, Neil Harrison	Churchill Curling Club	Churchill	Guelph	Wayne Middaugh (St. George's)	7-5	4th
**1998**; Details	**Wayne Middaugh, Graeme McCarrel, Ian Tetley, Scott Bailey**	**St. George's Golf & Country Club**	**Etobicoke**	Peterborough	Phil Daniel (Tilbury)	**12-1**	**1st**
1999; Details	Rich Moffatt, Howard Rajala, Chris Fulton, Paul Madden	Rideau Curling Club	Ottawa	Brantford	Phil Daniel (Tilbury)	6-5	6th
2000; Details	Peter Corner, Todd Brandwood, Drew Macklin, Dwayne Pyper	Glendale Golf & Country Club	Hamilton	Nepean	Wayne Middaugh (St. George's)	8-4	5th
2001; Details	Wayne Middaugh, Graeme McCarrel, Ian Tetley, Scott Bailey	St. George's Golf & Country Club	Islington	Woodstock	John Morris (Stayner)	9-4	3rd
2002; Details	John Morris, Joe Frans, Craig Savill, Brent Laing	Stayner Curling Club	Stayner	Belleville	Phil Daniel (Kingsville)	9-5	2nd
2003; Details	Bryan Cochrane, Bill Gamble, Ian MacAulay, John Steski	RCMP Curling Club	Ottawa	Mississauga	Peter Corner (Glendale)	5-6	T7th
2004; Details	Mike Harris, John Base, Phil Loevenmark, Trevor Wall	Oakville Curling Club	Oakville	Owen Sound	Glenn Howard (Coldwater)	6-5	6th
2005; Details	Wayne Middaugh, Graeme McCarrel, Joe Frans, Scott Bailey	St. George's Golf & Country Club	Islington	Whitby	Glenn Howard (Coldwater)	6-5	T5th
2006; Details	Glenn Howard, Richard Hart, Brent Laing, Craig Savill	Coldwater & District Curling Club	Coldwater	Guelph	Wayne Middaugh (St. George's)	11-2	2nd
**2007**; Details	**Glenn Howard, Richard Hart, Brent Laing, Craig Savill**	**Coldwater & District Curling Club**	**Coldwater**	Sarnia	Wayne Middaugh (St. George's)	**11-2**	**1st**
2008; Details	Glenn Howard, Richard Hart, Brent Laing, Craig Savill	Coldwater & District Curling Club	Coldwater	Waterloo	Peter Corner (Brampton)	11-3	2nd
2009; Details	Glenn Howard, Richard Hart, Brent Laing, Craig Savill	Coldwater & District Curling Club	Coldwater	Woodstock	Peter Corner (Brampton)	9-4	3rd
2010; Details	Glenn Howard, Richard Hart, Brent Laing, Craig Savill	Coldwater & District Curling Club	Coldwater	Napanee	Bryan Cochrane (Rideau)	12-1	2nd
2011; Details	Glenn Howard, Richard Hart, Brent Laing, Craig Savill	Coldwater & District Curling Club	Coldwater	Grimsby	Greg Balsdon (Loonie)	10-4	2nd
**2012**; Details	**Glenn Howard, Wayne Middaugh, Brent Laing, Craig Savill**	**Coldwater & District Curling Club**	**Coldwater**	Stratford	Peter Corner (Brampton)	**12-1**	**1st**
2013; Details	Glenn Howard, Wayne Middaugh, Brent Laing, Craig Savill	Coldwater & District Curling Club	Coldwater	Barrie	Joe Frans (Bradford)	11-3	3rd
2014; Details	Greg Balsdon, Mark Bice, Tyler Morgan, Jamie Farnell, Steve Bice	Glendale Golf & Country Club	Hamilton	Smiths Falls	Glenn Howard (Penetanguishene)	5-6	8th
2015; Details	Mark Kean, Mathew Camm, David Mathers, Scott Howard	Fenelon Falls Curling Club	Fenelon Falls	Dorchester	John Epping (Annandale)	5-6	8th
2016; Details	Glenn Howard, Richard Hart, Adam Spencer, Scott Howard	St. George's Golf & Country Club	Etobicoke	Brantford	John Epping (Donalda)	4-7	8th
2017; Details	Glenn Howard, Richard Hart, David Mathers, Scott Howard	St. George's Golf & Country Club	Etobicoke	Cobourg	Wayne Tuck Jr. (Brantford)	4-7	9th
2018; Details	John Epping, Mathew Camm, Patrick Janssen, Tim March	Leaside Curling Club	East York	Huntsville	Glenn Howard (St. George's)	9-4	3rd
2019; Details	Scott McDonald, Jonathan Beuk, Wesley Forget, Scott Chadwick	Cataraqui Golf & Country Club	Kingston	Elmira	John Epping (Leaside)	6-5	6th
2020; Details	John Epping, Ryan Fry, Mathew Camm, Brent Laing	Leaside Curling Club	East York	Cornwall	Glenn Howard (Penetanguishene)	8-5	5th
2021; Cancelled	John Epping, Ryan Fry, Mathew Camm, Brent Laing	Leaside Curling Club	East York	N/A	N/A	7–5	7th
2022; Details	Scott Howard, Adam Spencer, David Mathers, Tim March, Glenn Howard (DNP)	Penetanguishene Curling Club	Penetanguishene	Port Elgin	John Epping (Leaside)	4–4	9th
2023; Details	Mike McEwen, Ryan Fry, Brent Laing, Joey Hart	Royal Canadian Curling Club	Toronto	Port Elgin	Glenn Howard (Penetanguishene)	7–4	4th
2024; Details	Scott Howard, David Mathers, Tim March, Mathew Camm (added for Brier)	Penetanguishene Curling Club	Penetanguishene	Dorchester	Jayden King (London)	3–5	12th
2025; Details	Sam Mooibroek, Ryan Wiebe, Scott Mitchell, Nathan Steele	Whitby Curling Club	Whitby	Cobourg	Scott Howard (Navan)	4–4	8th
2026; Details	Jayden King, Dylan Niepage, Owen Henry, Victor Pietrangelo	Tillsonburg Curling Club	Tillsonburg	Elmira	Sam Mooibroek (Whitby)	5–4	6th
