= 2004 Ontario Men's Curling Championship =

- Host city: Owen Sound, Ontario
- Arena: Harry Lumley Bayshore Community Centre
- Dates: February 2–8
- Winner: Team Harris
- Curling club: Oakville CC, Oakville, Ontario
- Skip: Mike Harris
- Third: John Base
- Second: Phil Loevenmark
- Lead: Trevor Wall
- Finalist: Glenn Howard

The 2004 Ontario Men's Curling Championship was held February 2–8 at the Harry Lumley Bayshore Community Centre in Owen Sound.

1998 Olympic silver medallist Mike Harris and his team of John Base, Phil Loevenmark and Trevor Wall would go on to win his lone provincial championship of his career. They would go on to represent Ontario at the 2004 Nokia Brier in Saskatoon.

This would mark the final provincial championship for 2-time World champion and 56-year-old Ed Werenich who had come out of retirement for the season.

== Qualification ==
Qualification method	Berths	Qualifying team(s)
Region 1	2	Jim Guthmann; Bryan Cochrane
Region 2	2	Mike Harris; Peter Corner
Region 3	2	Al Hutchinson; Glenn Howard
Region 4	2	Brent Ross; Phil Daniel
Challenge Round East	1	Ed Werenich
Challenge Round West	1	Kirk Ziola

== Teams ==
Skip	Third	Second	Lead
Mike Harris	John Base	Phil Loevenmark	Trevor Wall
Glenn Howard	Richard Hart	Collin Mitchell	Jason Mitchell
Phil Daniel	Kevin Daniel	Rob Rumfeldt	Chris Lumbard
Peter Corner	Craig Kochan	Ian Robertson	Ken McDermot
Al Hutchinson	Daryl Shane	Bruce Cox	Peter Irwin
Bryan Cochrane	Bill Gamble	Brian Lewis	John Steski
Brent Ross	Doug Gibson	Wes Pike	Alex Faulkner
Jim Guthmann	Darryl Drumm	Graham Allan	Jim Collings
Ed Werenich	Neil Harrison	Ryan Werenich	Lino Di Iorio
Kirk Ziola	Wayne Tuck Jr.	Darcy Tomchick	Jake Higgs

== Standings ==
Skip	Club	Wins	Losses
Glenn Howard	Coldwater and District Curling Club	7	2
Mike Harris	Oakville Curling Club	7	2
Phil Daniel	Curling Club of Kingsville	5	4
Peter Corner	Thornhill Country Club	5	4
Kirk Ziola	Ilderton Curling Club	5	4
Bryan Cochrane	RCMP Curling Club	4	5
Al Hutchinson	Bluewater Curling Club	4	5
Ed Werenich	Avonlea Curling Club	4	5
Brent Ross	Harriston Curling Club	3	6
Jim Guthmann	Huntley Curling Club	1	8

== Tie-breaker ==
- Corner 6-4 Ziola

== Playoffs ==
Page playoff system
1	Glenn Howard	7
2	Mike Harris	3
3	Phil Daniel	7
4	Peter Corner	2

Semifinal
2	Mike Harris	8
3	Phil Daniel	7

Final
1	Glenn Howard	5
2	Mike Harris	9
