= 1995 Ontario Tankard =

- Host city: Kingston, Ontario
- Arena: Jock Harty Arena
- Dates: February 7-12
- Attendance: 18,500
- Winner: Team Werenich
- Curling club: Avonlea Curling Club, Don Mills, Ontario
- Skip: Ed Werenich
- Third: John Kawaja
- Second: Pat Perroud
- Lead: Neil Harrison
- Finalist: Russ Howard (Penetanguishene)

The 1995 Ontario Tankard, (known as the Labatt Tankard for sponsorship reasons) the southern Ontario men's provincial curling championship was held February 7-12 at the Jock Harty Arena in Kingston, Ontario. The winning rink of Ed Werenich, John Kawaja, Pat Perroud and Neil Harrison from the Avonlea Curling Club would go on to represent Ontario at the 1995 Labatt Brier in Halifax, Nova Scotia.

In the final, Ed Werenich's rink from the Avonlea Club in Metro Toronto defeated future Olympic gold medallist Russ Howard of Penetanguishene, 9–8, ending Howard's four straight Tankard winning streak. Howard had the advantage early in the game after scoring a four-ender in the fourth to lead 6–2. Team Wereinch rallied by getting two in the fifth, and stole one in the sixth, to trail 6–5. In the seventh, Werenich made a perfect freeze on his last, forcing Howard to a draw to the four foot to take a 7–5 lead. Werenich tied the game with a deuce in the eighth. In the ninth, Werenich made a crucial hit and roll behind cover against two Howard stones on his last rock. Howard then had to draw to the four foot, which he was heavy on, losing the point on a measurement, putting Werenich ahead 8–7. In the tenth, Howard drew to the four foot to score a single point with just 10 seconds left on his time clock, to put the game into an extra end. In the extra, the Werenich rink kept the free guard zone clear, thanks to a split by lead Neil Harrison. However, third John Kawaja missed his clearing attempt, allowing Howard a chance to go around a guard. Howard couldn't quite bury his rock though, allowing Werenich a hit and stay to win the game which he made. The game was played in front of 2,500 fans in attendance.

== Standings ==
Final standings

Key
Teams to Playoffs
Teams to Tiebreakers

Skip	Club	Wins	Losses
Russ Howard	Penetanguishene	7	2
Wayne Middaugh	St. George's	7	2
Mike Harris	Tam Heather	6	3
Ed Werenich	Avonlea	6	3
Kirk Ziola	London	4	5
Bob Ingram	Ridgetown	4	5
John Base	Oakville	4	5
Rich Moffatt	Rideau	3	6
Peter Mellor	Kitchener	2	7
John McCoppen	Royal Kingston	2	7

== Scores ==
=== February 7 ===
Draw 1

- Werenich 7, Ingram 4
- Harris 8, Ziola 4
- Howard 6, McCoppen 5
- Middaugh 3, Mellor 1
- Moffatt 9, Base 2

Draw 2

- Base 7, Ziola 6
- Werenich 8, McCoppen 4
- Middaugh 7, Ingram 4
- Harris 9, Moffatt 7
- Mellor 8, Howard 7

=== February 8 ===
Draw 3

- Howard 5, Harris 3
- Middaugh 9, Moffatt 7
- Werenich 11, Mellor 7
- Base 7, McCoppen 3
- Ziola 9, Ingram 8

Draw 4

- Middaugh 8, Werenich 1
- Howard 7, Ziola 5
- Base 8, Harris 4
- Ingram 5, Mellor 3
- McCoppen 9, Moffatt 3

=== February 9 ===
Draw 5

- Ingram 9, McCoppen 8
- Mellor 9, Base 7
- Moffatt 10, Ziola 5
- Harris 10, Werenich 8
- Howard 8, Middaugh 4

Draw 6

- Moffatt 5, Mellor 4
- Howard 8, Ingram 4
- Middaugh 8, Harris 6
- Ziola 10, McCoppen 9
- Werenich 8, Base 4

=== February 10 ===
Draw 7

- Ziola 8, Middaugh 7
- Werenich 6, Moffatt 4
- McCoppen 6, Mellor 5
- Base 8, Howard 0
- Harris 7, Ingram 4

Draw 8

- Harris 6, McCoppen 5
- Middaugh 5, Base 4
- Howard 8, Werenich 3
- Ingram 9, Moffatt 7
- Ziola 9, Mellor 8

=== February 11 ===
Draw 9

- Howard 8, Moffatt 3
- Harris 6, Mellor 4
- Ingram 7, Base 5
- Werenich 9, Ziola 8
- Middaugh 7, McCoppen 2

== Tiebreaker ==
Team	1	2	3	4	5	6	7	8	9	10	Final
Ed Werenich	0	2	2	0	2	0	1	0	0	2	9
Mike Harris	4	0	0	1	0	1	0	0	1	0	7

== Playoffs ==
Semifinal			Final
			1	Russ Howard	7
2	Wayne Middaugh	4	3	Ed Werenich	8
3	Ed Werenich	6

=== Semifinal ===
Team	1	2	3	4	5	6	7	8	9	10	Final
Ed Werenich	0	1	0	2	0	1	0	1	0	1	6
Wayne Middaugh	0	0	1	0	1	0	2	0	0	0	4

=== Final ===
Team	1	2	3	4	5	6	7	8	9	10	11	Final
Ed Werenich	0	0	2	0	2	1	0	2	1	0	1	9
Russ Howard	1	1	0	4	0	0	1	0	0	1	0	8
