= 1993 Ontario Tankard =

- Host city: Trenton, Ontario
- Arena: Duncan McDonald Memorial Community Gardens
- Dates: February 9–14
- Winner: Team Howard
- Curling club: Penetanguishene Curling Club, Penetanguishene, Ontario
- Skip: Russ Howard
- Third: Glenn Howard
- Second: Wayne Middaugh
- Lead: Peter Corner
- Finalist: Mike Harris (Tam Heather)

The 1993 Ontario Tankard, (known as the Blue Light Tankard for sponsorship reasons) the southern Ontario men's provincial curling championship was held February 9–14 at the Duncan McDonald Memorial Community Gardens in Trenton, Ontario. The winning rink of Russ Howard, Glenn Howard, Wayne Middaugh and Peter Corner from the Penetanguishene Curling Club would go on to represent Ontario at the 1993 Labatt Brier in Ottawa, which they went on to win. The team then went on to win the 1993 World Men's Curling Championship for Canada.

The final was a rematch of the 1992 Tankard between Howard and Mike Harris, and just like in 1992, Howard and his Penetanguishene rink of brother Glenn, Wayne Middaugh and Peter Corner were victorious over Harris and his rink of George Karrys, Collin Mitchell and Richard Hart of the Tam Heather Club in West Hill, Scarborough. It was Russ Howard's seventh provincial title. They won the game 7–6, thanks in part to a missed shot by Harris' second Collin Mitchell in the tenth end, which saw one of his stones pick, failing to make the hog line. Heading into the 10th, Howard led 6–5. After Mitchell's picked stone, Howard's second Wayne Middaugh capitalized by making a hit to sit two. Harris' third Richard Hart then hit a guard on his double takeout attempt. After Glenn Howard made a draw to the four-foot, the teams traded takeouts which resulted in Team Howard sitting three. On his first rock of the 10th, Mike Harris wrecked on a guard, which was replaced by Russ Howard. Harris then attempted to raise one his own stones, but only cut Howard down to two, thus losing the game. There were 1,500 spectators in attendance to see the final.

== Standings ==
Final standings

Key
Teams to Playoffs

Skip (club)	Wins	Losses
Mike Harris (Tam Heather)	8	1
Ed Werenich (Churchill)	7	2
Russ Howard (Penetanguishene)	7	2
Dave Merklinger (Ottawa Granite)	6	3
Ron Diguer (Ottawa Granite)	5	4
Bob Ingram (Ridgetown)	3	6
Rich Moffatt (Rideau)	3	6
Axel Larsen (Guelph)	2	7
Bob Turcotte (Annandale)	2	7
Nick Rizzo (Brantford)	2	7

== Scores ==
=== February 9 ===
Draw 1

- Harris 5, Ingram 4
- Diguer 7, Larsen 4
- Werenich 7, Turcotte 6
- Moffatt 6, Rizzo 5
- Howard 7, Merklinger 6

Draw 2

- Howard 8, Larsen 6
- Harris 6, Turcotte 4
- Moffatt 10, Ingram 4
- Diguer 5, Merklinger 4
- Werenich 8, Rizzo 7

=== February 10 ===
Draw 3

- Diguer 5, Werenich 4
- Merklinger 7, Moffatt 6
- Harris 6, Rizzo 5
- Howard 8, Turcotte 7
- Ingram 8, Larsen 4

Draw 4

- Harris 8, Moffatt 1
- Werenich 7, Larsen 4
- Howard 8, Diguer 3
- Ingram 7, Rizzo 6
- Merklinger 8, Turcotte 7

=== February 11 ===
Draw 5

- Ingram 8, Turcotte 5
- Howard 6, Rizzo 4
- Merklinger 9, Larsen 5
- Harris 8, Diguer 5
- Werenich 8, Moffatt 5

Draw 6

- Merklinger 8, Rizzo 1
- Werenich 8, Ingram 7
- Diguer 7, Moffatt 6
- Larsen 6, Turcotte 2
- Harris 7, Howard 4

=== February 12 ===
Draw 7

- Harris 7, Merklinger 6
- Werenich 7, Howard 6
- Larsen 11, Moffatt 6
- Diguer 5, Ingram 4
- Turcotte 9, Rizzo 3

Draw 8

- Werenich 7, Harris 1
- Rizzo 8, Larsen 7
- Turcotte 7, Diguer 5
- Howard 6, Moffatt 4
- Merklinger 10, Ingram 7

=== February 13 ===
Draw 9

- Merklinger 8, Werenich 7
- Rizzo 7, Diguer 2
- Howard 10, Ingram 5
- Harris 8, Larsen 6
- Moffatt 9, Turcotte 4

== Playoffs ==
Semifinal			Final
			1	Mike Harris	6
2	Ed Werenich	6	3	Russ Howard	7
3	Russ Howard	7

=== Final ===
February 14

Team	1	2	3	4	5	6	7	8	9	10	Final
Russ Howard	0	2	1	0	1	0	0	1	0	2	7
Mike Harris	1	0	0	2	0	1	1	0	1	0	6
