= Stu Sells Brantford Nissan Classic =

Stu Sells Brantford NISSAN Classic
- Established: 1988
- Host city: Brantford, Ontario
- Arena: Brant Curling Club
- Men's purse: $15,000
- Women's purse: $15,000

Current champions (2025)
- Men: (Ontario) Sam Mooibroek
- Women: (Quebec) Laurie St-Georges

Location in Canada

The Stu Sells Brantford NISSAN Classic is a curling tournament or bonspiel part of the men's and women's curling tour. The event existed exclusively on the Ontario Curling Tour until 2017, before it was added as a WCT event for 2018 and 2019. It was also a WCT event in 1996. The event is an annual event held at the end of November and the beginning of December. The event took place at the Brant Curling Club in Brantford, Ontario until 2017. It was moved to the Paris Curling Club in Paris, Ontario in 2018 and then the Brantford Golf & Country Club for 2022. Following the closure of curling operations and the Golf and Country Club, the event moved back to the Brant Curling Club in 2024.

A women's event was held in 2016 and did not return until 2022.

Previous names:

- 1988–1991: Saxon Classic
- 1992–1993: Brant Classic
- 1994–1996: Sobey's Classic
- 1997–1999: Doctor-Crete Curling Classic
- 2000–2016: Brantford NISSAN Classic
- 2017: Brantford NISSAN Men's Classic
- 2018: NISSAN Curling Classic
- 2019: Brantford NISSAN Classic
- 2021–present: Stu Sells Brantford NISSAN Classic

== Past Champions ==
Only skip's name is displayed.

=== Men ===
Year	Winning skip	Runner up skip	Purse (CAD)
1988	(Ontario) John Kawaja	(Ontario) Jim Sharples	$11,000
1989	(Ontario) Axel Larsen	(Ontario) Paul Savage	
1990	(Ontario) Ron Long	(Ontario) Kevin Breivik	$12,000
1991	(Ontario) Richard Hart	(Ontario) Peter Steski	$11,000
1992	(Ontario) Mike Colborne	(Ontario) Axel Larsen	$12,000
1993	(Ontario) Wyllie Allan	(Ontario) Dan Mustapic	$12,000
1994	(Ontario) Paul Savage	(Ontario) Rob Krepps	
1995			
1996	(Ontario) Bob Ingram	(Ontario) John Base	$16,000
1997	(Ontario) John Base	(Ontario) Heath McCormick	
1998	(Ontario) John Morris	(Ontario) Kevin Breivik	$15,000
1999	(Ontario) John Morris	(Ontario) Bob Ingram	
2000	(Ontario) Bob Turcotte	(Ontario) Phil Daniel	
2001	(Ontario) Brent Palmer	(Ontario) Gareth Parry	$16,000
2002	(Ontario) John Morris	(Ontario) Phil Daniel	$16,000
2003	(Ontario) Chad Allen	(Ontario) Scott Banner	$16,000
2004	(Ontario) Todd Brandwood	(Ontario) Phil Daniel	$20,400
2005	(Ontario) Peter Mellor	(Ontario) Phil Daniel	$20,400
2006	(Ontario) John Epping	(Ontario) Rob Lobel	$20,000
2007	(Ontario) Pat Ferris	(Ontario) Phil Daniel	$17,100
2008	(Ontario) Dale Matchett	(Ontario) Wayne Tuck Jr.	$22,000
2009	(Ontario) Glenn Howard	(Ontario) Mark Bice	$22,000
2010	(Ontario) Dale Matchett	(Ontario) Wayne Tuck, Jr.	$22,000
2011	(Ontario) Mark Bice	(Ontario) Joe Frans	$22,000
2012	(Ontario) Joe Frans	(Ontario) Bowie Abbis-Mills	$22,000
2013	(Ontario) Joe Frans	(Ontario) Greg Balsdon	$22,000
2014	(Ontario) Joe Frans	(Ontario) Jake Walker	$18,000
2015	(Ontario) Richard Krell	(Ontario) Greg Balsdon	$12,000
2016	(Ontario) Mark Bice	(Ontario) Codey Maus	$11,600
2017	(Ontario) Richard Krell	(Ontario) Mark Kean	$16,000
2018	(Ontario) Glenn Howard	(Ontario) Tanner Horgan	$16,000
2019	(Ontario) Wayne Tuck Jr.	(Ontario) Codey Maus	$16,000
2020	Cancelled		
2021	(Ontario) Sam Mooibroek	(Ontario) Paul Moffatt	$11,100
2022	(Ontario) Pat Ferris	(Quebec) Félix Asselin	$15,000
2023	(Quebec) Félix Asselin	(Ontario) Sam Mooibroek	$15,000
2024	(Ontario) Sam Mooibroek	(Ontario) Jonathan Beuk	$15,000
2025	(Ontario) Sam Mooibroek	(Ontario) Mark Kean	$15,000

=== Women ===
Year	Winning skip	Runner up skip	Purse (CAD)
2016	(Ontario) Jacqueline Harrison	(Ontario) Julie Tippin	$8,100
2022	(South Korea) Gim Eun-ji	(Ontario) Danielle Inglis	$15,000
2023	(Ontario) Courtney Auld	(Northwest Territories) Kerry Galusha	$15,000
2024	(Nova Scotia) Christina Black	(Ontario) Breanna Rozon	$15,000
2025	(Quebec) Laurie St-Georges	(United States) Elizabeth Cousins	$15,000
