= 1996 Ontario Nokia Cup =

- Host city: Pickering, Ontario
- Arena: Pickering Recreation Complex
- Dates: February 6-11
- Winner: Team Ingram
- Curling club: Ridgetown Curling Club, Ridgetown, Ontario
- Skip: Bob Ingram
- Third: Larry Smyth
- Second: Robert Rumfeldt
- Lead: Jim Brackett
- Finalist: Russ Howard (MacTier)

The 1996 Nokia Cup, southern Ontario men's provincial curling championship was held February 6-11 at the Pickering Recreation Complex in Pickering, Ontario. The winning rink of Bob Ingram, Larry Smyth, Robert Rumfeldt, Jim Brackett from the Ridgetown Curling Club would go on to represent Ontario at the 1996 Labatt Brier in Kamloops, British Columbia.

Ingram won his lone provincial championship, defeating future Olympic gold medallist Russ Howard in the final. Ingram scored a big four-ender in the first thanks to a Howard miss, and Howard missed a double attempt in the last end which gave the win to Ingram.

== Standings ==
Final standings

Key
Teams to Playoffs

Skip	Club	Wins	Losses
Russ Howard	MacTier	7	2
Ed Werenich	Avonlea	7	2
Bob Ingram	Ridgetown	6	3
Adam Spencer	Guelph	5	4
Brad Minogue	Highland	5	4
Alex Tosh	Royal Kingston	4	5
Ian Robertson	Thornhill	3	6
Dave Walker	Avonlea	3	6
Bruce Park	Brant	2	7
Brad Shinn	Ottawa	2	7

== Scores ==
=== February 6 ===
Draw 1

- Spencer 7, Minogue 6
- Werenich 10, Ingram 5
- Roberson 8, Park 0
- Tosh 8, Walker 6
- Shinn 8, Howard 5

Draw 2

- Werenich 10, Shinn 4
- Minogue 9, Park 3
- Walker 7, Spencer 4
- Howard 10, Ingram 8
- Tosh 8, Robertson 5

=== February 7 ===
Draw 3

- Ingram 9, Robertson 4
- Howard 9, Walker 7
- Minogue 6, Tosh 4
- Park 7, Shinn 5
- Spencer 9, Werenich 8

Draw 4

- Minogue 9, Walker 4
- Werenich 9, Robertson 6
- Ingram 9, Shinn 2
- Tosh 7, Spencer 2
- Howard 5, Park 4

=== February 8 ===
Draw 5

- Tosh 8, Shinn 4
- Spencer 8, Park 4
- Howard 10, Werenich 8
- Minogue 6, Ingram 5
- Robertson 8, Walker 5

Draw 6

- Howard 9, Tosh 6
- Spencer 7, Robertson 6
- Ingram 11, Walker 3
- Werenich 9, Park 2
- Minogue 9, Shinn 4

=== February 9 ===
Draw 7

- Tosh 8, Park 7
- Werenich 10, Walker 4
- Howard 10, Minogue 2
- Shinn 10, Robertson 8
- Ingram 8, Spencer 1

Draw 8

- Werenich 10, Tosh 3
- Ingram 6, Park 3
- Walker 9, Shinn 8
- Robertson 8, Minogue 4
- Howard 9, Spencer 3

=== February 10 ===
Draw 9

- Robertson 7, Howard 5
- Ingram 12, Tosh 3
- Spencer 11, Shinn 5
- Werenich 7, Minogue 2
- Walker 10, Park 6

== Playoffs ==
Semifinal			Final
			1	Russ Howard	5
2	Ed Werenich	5	3	Bob Ingram	7
3	Bob Ingram	8

=== Semifinal ===
February 10, 1996

Team	1	2	3	4	5	6	7	8	9	10	Final
Bob Ingram	0	1	0	0	2	0	0	1	2	1	8
Ed Werenich	1	0	0	1	0	2	1	0	0	0	5

=== Final ===
February 11, 1996

Team	1	2	3	4	5	6	7	8	9	10	Final
Bob Ingram	4	0	0	0	0	0	1	0	1	1	7
Russ Howard	0	2	0	0	1	1	0	1	0	0	5
