= 1997 Ontario Nokia Cup =

- Host city: Guelph, Ontario
- Arena: Guelph Memorial Gardens
- Dates: February 4–9
- Winner: Team Werenich
- Curling club: Churchill Curling Club, Churchill, Ontario
- Skip: Ed Werenich
- Third: John Kawaja
- Second: Pat Perroud
- Lead: Neil Harrison
- Finalist: Wayne Middaugh

The 1997 Nokia Cup, southern Ontario men's provincial curling championship was held February 4–9 at the Guelph Memorial Gardens in Guelph, Ontario. The winning rink of Ed Werenich, John Kawaja, Pat Perroud and Neil Harrison from the Churchill Curling Club would go on to represent Ontario at the 1997 Labatt Brier in Calgary, Alberta. It was Werenich's 10th and final provincial title of his career, which included World Championships in 1983 and 1990.

== Standings ==
Final standings

Key
Teams to Playoffs
Teams to Tie-Breakers

Skip	Club	Wins	Losses
Wayne Middaugh	St. George	8	1
Ed Werenich	Churchill	7	2
Russ Howard	MacTier	5	4
Peter Steski	City View	5	4
Peter Corner	Brant	4	5
Mike Harris	Tam Heather	4	5
Rich Moffatt	Rideau	4	5
John Base	Oakville	3	6
Kevin Breivik	London	3	6
Bill Walsh	Rideau	2	7

== Scores ==
=== February 4 ===
Draw 1

- Steski 9-7 Harris
- Base 9-8 Walsh
- Howard 9-4 Moffatt
- Middaugh 9-7 Corner
- Werenich 6-5 Breivik

Draw 2

- Werenich 8-6 Base
- Moffatt 8-2 Harris
- Corner 7-5 Steski
- Breivik 6-4 Walsh
- Middaugh 5-2 Howard

=== February 5 ===
Draw 3

- Walsh 8-4 Howard
- Breivik 7-4 Corner
- Middaugh 7-1 Harris
- Werenich 5-2 Moffatt
- Steski 7-6 Base

Draw 4

- Corner 5-4 Harris
- Base 8-6 Howard
- Werenich 8-5 Walsh
- Middaugh 5-2 Steski
- Breivik 6-4 Moffatt

=== February 6 ===
Draw 5

- Steski 8-4 Moffatt
- Werenich 11-10 Middaugh
- Base 6-5 Breivik
- Harris 8-7 Walsh
- Howard 7-5 Corner

Draw 6

- Middaugh 11-5 Breivik
- Howard 8-7 Steski
- Walsh 9-0 Corner
- Moffatt 8-2 Base
- Harris 7-4 Werenich

=== February 7 ===
Draw 7

- Corner 6-4 Base
- Harris 8-2 Breivik
- Middaugh 6-5 Moffatt
- Werenich 6-5 Howard
- Steski 9-6 Walsh

Draw 8

- Moffatt 7-5 Walsh
- Corner 8-3 Werenich
- Howard 6-5 Harris
- Steski 7-4 Breivik
- Middaugh 9-7 Base

Draw 9

- Howard 10-1 Breivik
- Middaugh 8-5 Walsh
- Werenich 9-4 Steski
- Harris 8-2 Base
- Moffatt 6-3 Corner

== Tie Breaker ==
Team	Final
Peter Steski	5
Russ Howard	7

== Playoffs ==
Semifinal			Final
			1	Wayne Middaugh	6
2	Russ Howard	4	3	Ed Werenich	7
3	Ed Werenich	8
