= 1998 Ontario Nokia Cup =

Curling championship

- Host city: Peterborough, Ontario
- Arena: Peterborough Memorial Centre
- Dates: February 10–15
- Winner: Team Middaugh
- Curling club: St. George's Golf and Country Club, Toronto, Ontario
- Skip: Wayne Middaugh
- Third: Graeme McCarrel
- Second: Ian Tetley
- Lead: Scott Bailey
- Finalist: Phil Daniel

The 1998 Nokia Cup, southern Ontario men's provincial curling championship was held February 10–15 at the Peterborough Memorial Centre in Peterborough, Ontario. The winning rink of Wayne Middaugh, Graeme McCarrel, Ian Tetley and Scott Bailey from Etobicoke would go on to represent Ontario at the 1998 Labatt Brier in Winnipeg, Manitoba.

== Teams ==
Skip	Third	Second	Lead	Club
Wayne Middaugh	Graeme McCarrel	Ian Tetley	Scott Bailey	St. George's Golf and Country Club, Etobicoke
Phil Daniel	Kevin Daniel	Pete Dekoning	Chris Lumbard	Tilbury Curling Club, Tilbury
Russ Howard	Glenn Howard	Noel Herron	Steve Small	MacTier Curling Club, MacTier
Al Hutchinson	Barry Middleton	Wyllie Allen	Darryl MacKenzie	Tara Curling Club, Tara
Bryan Cochrane	Bill Gamble	Ian MacAulay	Gord Schade	Ottawa Curling Club, Ottawa
Peter Corner	Nick Rizzo	David Carruthers	Brad Savage	Brant Curling Club, Brantford
Stu Garner	Jeff Channell	Ryan Lumbard	Bruce Scott	Weston Golf & Country Club, Weston
Rich Moffatt	Howard Rajala	Chris Fulton	Paul Madden	Rideau Curling Club, Ottawa
Dave Van Dine	J.P. Lachance	Dave Murphy	Scott Linseman	Rideau Curling Club, Ottawa
Peter Steski	Jason Mitchell	Jeff Steski	Shaun Harris	Hamilton Victoria Curling Club, Hamilton

== Standings ==
The final standings were as follows:

Key
Teams to Playoffs
Teams to Tiebreaker

Skip	Wins	Losses
Wayne Middaugh	8	1
Rich Moffatt	7	2
Russ Howard	5	4
Phil Daniel	5	4
Peter Steski	4	5
Stu Garner	4	5
Peter Corner	3	6
Bryan Cochrane	3	6
Dave Van Dine	3	6
Al Hutchinson	3	6

== Tiebreaker ==
- Daniel 8, Howard 6

== Playoffs ==
Semifinal			Final
			1	Wayne Middaugh	6
2	Rich Moffatt	4	3	Phil Daniel	4
3	Phil Daniel	6

=== Final ===
February 15, 2:00pm

Team	1	2	3	4	5	6	7	8	9	10	Final
Phil Daniel	0	0	2	0	1	0	0	0	1	0	4
Wayne Middaugh	1	0	0	2	0	1	0	1	0	1	6
