= 1997 Canadian Olympic Curling Trials =

- Host city: Brandon, Manitoba
- Arena: Keystone Centre
- Dates: November 22–30, 1997
- Men's winner: (Ontario) Mike Harris
- Skip: Mike Harris
- Third: Richard Hart
- Second: Collin Mitchell
- Lead: George Karrys
- Alternate: Paul Savage
- Finalist: (Alberta) Kevin Martin
- Women's winner: (Saskatchewan) Sandra Schmirler
- Skip: Sandra Schmirler
- Third: Jan Betker
- Second: Joan McCusker
- Lead: Marcia Gudereit
- Alternate: Atina Ford
- Finalist: (Alberta) Shannon Kleibrink

The 1997 Canadian Olympic Curling Trials were held from November 22 to 30, 1997 at the Keystone Centre in Brandon, Manitoba. They were held to determine the Canadian National men's and women's Teams for the 1998 Winter Olympics.

== Men ==
=== Qualification ===
Qualification method	Qualifying team
Dec. 1995 World Curling Tour Championship	Wayne Middaugh
Playoff between the 1994 Labatt Brier and 1995 Labatt Brier champions	Kerry Burtnyk
1996 Labatt Brier	Jeff Stoughton
Canadian Club Double Cashspiel	Dave Smith
Welton Beauchamp Classic	Mike Harris
MT&T Mobility Classic	Ed Werenich
Bessborough-SaskTel Curling Classic	~~Wayne Middaugh~~; Brad Hannah
1996–97 World Curling Tour money leaders	~~Wayne Middaugh~~; Doran Johnson (Note: Johnson was kicked off his team during the off season, and was replaced by last rock thrower Kevin Park as the team's skip.) (Kevin Park)
1997 Labatt Brier	Kevin Martin
1997 World Curling Tour Championship	Russ Howard

=== Teams ===
Skip	Third	Second	Lead	Alternate	Locale
Kerry Burtnyk	Jeff Ryan	Rob Meakin	Keith Fenton	Scott Grant	Assiniboine Memorial CC, Winnipeg, Manitoba
Mike Harris	Richard Hart	Collin Mitchell	George Karrys	Paul Savage	Tam Heather CC, Scarborough, Ontario
Russ Howard	Glenn Howard	Scott Patterson	Phil Loevenmark	Larry Merkley	MacTier CC, MacTier, Ontario
Brent MacDonald	Brad Hannah	Blake MacDonald	Wade Johnston	Mark Johnson	Ottewell CC, Edmonton, Alberta
Kevin Martin	Don Walchuk	Rudy Ramcharan	Don Bartlett	Jules Owchar	Ottewell CC, Edmonton, Alberta
Wayne Middaugh	Graeme McCarrel	Ian Tetley	Scott Bailey		St. George's G&CC, Etobicoke, Ontario
Kevin Park	Les Rogers	Jerry Semen	Kerry Park	Scott Park	Shamrock CC, Edmonton, Alberta
Dave Smith	Jon Mead	Peter Nicholls	Don Harvey	John Helston	St. Vital CC, Winnipeg, Manitoba
Jeff Stoughton	Ken Tresoor	Garry Vandenberghe	Steve Gould	Arnold Asham	Charleswood CC, Winnipeg, Manitoba
Ed Werenich	John Kawaja	Pat Perroud	Neil Harrison	Vic Peters	Churchill CC, Churchill, Ontario

=== Final standings ===
Skip	W	L
(Ontario) Mike Harris	7	2
(Ontario) Ed Werenich	6	3
(Alberta) Kevin Martin	6	3
(Manitoba) Jeff Stoughton	5	4
(Manitoba) Kerry Burtnyk	5	4
(Manitoba) Dave Smith	5	4
(Alberta) Brent MacDonald	4	5
(Ontario) Wayne Middaugh	3	6
(Ontario) Russ Howard	3	6
(Alberta) Kevin Park	1	8

=== Scores ===
==== Draw 1 ====
Sheet A	1	2	3	4	5	6	7	8	9	10	Final
(Ontario) Wayne Middaugh 🔨	0	0	1	0	0	1	0	2	0	X	4
(Ontario) Ed Werenich	0	0	0	1	1	0	3	0	2	X	7

Sheet B	1	2	3	4	5	6	7	8	9	10	11	Final
(Manitoba) Jeff Stoughton 🔨	0	1	0	2	0	2	0	1	0	1	0	7
(Alberta) Kevin Martin	0	0	2	0	1	0	3	0	1	0	1	8

Sheet C	1	2	3	4	5	6	7	8	9	10	Final
(Manitoba) Dave Smith	0	1	1	0	1	0	3	0	X	X	6
(Alberta) Brent MacDonald 🔨	2	0	0	3	0	3	0	3	X	X	11

Sheet D	1	2	3	4	5	6	7	8	9	10	Final
(Ontario) Russ Howard 🔨	2	1	6	0	0	1	0	X	X	X	10
(Alberta) Kevin Park	0	0	0	2	1	0	1	X	X	X	4

Sheet E	1	2	3	4	5	6	7	8	9	10	Final
(Ontario) Mike Harris 🔨	0	2	0	0	2	1	0	1	0	1	7
(Manitoba) Kerry Burtnyk	2	0	0	1	0	0	1	0	2	0	6

==== Draw 2 ====
Sheet A	1	2	3	4	5	6	7	8	9	10	11	Final
(Manitoba) Dave Smith 🔨	0	1	0	2	0	1	0	2	0	0	0	6
(Manitoba) Kerry Burtnyk	0	0	1	0	1	0	3	0	0	1	2	8

Sheet B	1	2	3	4	5	6	7	8	9	10	Final
(Ontario) Russ Howard 🔨	0	0	1	0	0	1	2	0	0	X	4
(Ontario) Mike Harris	1	2	0	1	1	0	0	1	1	X	7

Sheet C	1	2	3	4	5	6	7	8	9	10	Final
(Manitoba) Jeff Stoughton 🔨	1	0	1	0	3	1	0	1	0	X	7
(Ontario) Ed Werenich	0	1	0	1	0	0	1	0	1	X	4

Sheet D	1	2	3	4	5	6	7	8	9	10	Final
(Alberta) Kevin Martin 🔨	0	0	0	2	0	2	3	0	1	X	8
(Alberta) Brent MacDonald	0	0	0	0	3	0	0	1	0	X	4

Sheet E	1	2	3	4	5	6	7	8	9	10	Final
(Ontario) Wayne Middaugh 🔨	0	1	0	2	1	0	2	2	X	X	8
(Alberta) Kevin Park	1	0	1	0	0	1	0	0	X	X	3

==== Draw 3 ====
Sheet A	1	2	3	4	5	6	7	8	9	10	Final
(Alberta) Brent MacDonald 🔨	0	1	0	1	1	0	2	1	0	1	7
(Ontario) Wayne Middaugh	1	0	2	0	0	1	0	0	1	0	5

Sheet B	1	2	3	4	5	6	7	8	9	10	Final
(Alberta) Kevin Park 🔨	0	0	0	0	2	0	0	2	0	X	4
(Manitoba) Dave Smith	0	1	0	3	0	2	1	0	3	X	10

Sheet C	1	2	3	4	5	6	7	8	9	10	Final
(Manitoba) Kerry Burtnyk 🔨	1	0	1	1	0	2	0	2	0	1	8
(Ontario) Russ Howard	0	2	0	0	1	0	2	0	1	0	6

Sheet D	1	2	3	4	5	6	7	8	9	10	Final
(Ontario) Mike Harris 🔨	3	1	0	2	4	X	X	X	X	X	10
(Manitoba) Jeff Stoughton	0	0	1	0	0	X	X	X	X	X	1

Sheet E	1	2	3	4	5	6	7	8	9	10	Final
(Ontario) Ed Werenich 🔨	1	0	1	0	0	2	0	3	0	1	8
(Alberta) Kevin Martin	0	1	0	1	1	0	1	0	2	0	6

==== Draw 4 ====
Sheet A	1	2	3	4	5	6	7	8	9	10	Final
(Alberta) Kevin Park 🔨	2	0	1	0	1	0	0	1	0	2	7
(Alberta) Kevin Martin	0	1	0	2	0	1	0	0	1	0	5

Sheet B	1	2	3	4	5	6	7	8	9	10	Final
(Alberta) Brent MacDonald 🔨	0	0	0	0	1	0	0	2	1	X	4
(Ontario) Ed Werenich	0	1	0	1	0	3	1	0	0	X	6

Sheet C	1	2	3	4	5	6	7	8	9	10	Final
(Ontario) Mike Harris 🔨	1	0	1	0	0	0	2	0	1	1	6
(Manitoba) Dave Smith	0	3	0	1	1	0	0	2	0	0	7

Sheet D	1	2	3	4	5	6	7	8	9	10	Final
(Manitoba) Kerry Burtnyk 🔨	0	1	0	1	0	1	0	1	0	X	4
(Ontario) Wayne Middaugh	1	0	2	0	1	0	3	0	1	X	8

Sheet E	1	2	3	4	5	6	7	8	9	10	Final
(Ontario) Russ Howard 🔨	2	0	3	1	0	1	0	0	2	1	10
(Manitoba) Jeff Stoughton	0	2	0	0	3	0	2	0	0	0	7

==== Draw 5 ====
Sheet A	1	2	3	4	5	6	7	8	9	10	Final
(Manitoba) Dave Smith 🔨	1	2	0	2	0	3	X	X	X	X	8
(Ontario) Russ Howard	0	0	1	0	2	0	X	X	X	X	3

Sheet B	1	2	3	4	5	6	7	8	9	10	Final
(Alberta) Kevin Martin 🔨	0	0	1	0	0	0	X	X	X	X	1
(Manitoba) Kerry Burtnyk	2	3	0	0	2	1	X	X	X	X	8

Sheet C	1	2	3	4	5	6	7	8	9	10	11	Final
(Manitoba) Jeff Stoughton 🔨	2	0	1	0	0	1	0	1	0	0	0	5
(Alberta) Brent MacDonald	0	1	0	1	0	0	2	0	0	1	1	6

Sheet D	1	2	3	4	5	6	7	8	9	10	Final
(Ontario) Ed Werenich 🔨	1	0	1	0	0	2	0	0	0	X	4
(Alberta) Kevin Park	0	0	0	0	1	0	1	0	0	X	2

Sheet E	1	2	3	4	5	6	7	8	9	10	Final
(Ontario) Wayne Middaugh 🔨	0	1	0	2	0	2	0	0	2	X	7
(Ontario) Mike Harris	0	0	2	0	2	0	1	3	0	X	8

==== Draw 6 ====
Sheet A	1	2	3	4	5	6	7	8	9	10	Final
(Ontario) Ed Werenich 🔨	1	0	1	0	1	1	0	0	0	X	4
(Ontario) Mike Harris	0	1	0	2	0	0	1	1	1	X	6

Sheet B	1	2	3	4	5	6	7	8	9	10	Final
(Manitoba) Jeff Stoughton 🔨	0	1	0	2	0	0	2	0	1	2	8
(Alberta) Kevin Park	0	0	3	0	1	0	0	2	0	0	6

Sheet C	1	2	3	4	5	6	7	8	9	10	Final
(Alberta) Kevin Martin 🔨	1	0	1	0	0	2	0	3	0	X	7
(Ontario) Russ Howard	0	1	0	0	2	0	1	0	1	X	5

Sheet D	1	2	3	4	5	6	7	8	9	10	Final
(Ontario) Wayne Middaugh 🔨	0	0	0	0	0	X	X	X	X	X	0
(Manitoba) Dave Smith	4	0	1	1	2	X	X	X	X	X	8

Sheet E	1	2	3	4	5	6	7	8	9	10	Final
(Alberta) Brent MacDonald 🔨	0	1	0	2	0	1	0	0	X	X	4
(Manitoba) Kerry Burtnyk	0	0	3	0	3	0	0	3	X	X	9

==== Draw 7 ====
Sheet A	1	2	3	4	5	6	7	8	9	10	Final
(Alberta) Kevin Park 🔨	0	2	0	1	0	2	0	0	X	X	5
(Alberta) Brent MacDonald	1	0	2	0	2	0	2	4	X	X	11

Sheet B	1	2	3	4	5	6	7	8	9	10	Final
(Ontario) Russ Howard 🔨	0	1	0	0	1	0	2	1	1	0	6
(Ontario) Wayne Middaugh	1	0	2	1	0	2	0	0	0	1	7

Sheet C	1	2	3	4	5	6	7	8	9	10	11	Final
(Manitoba) Kerry Burtnyk 🔨	0	0	1	1	0	0	1	0	1	1	0	5
(Ontario) Ed Werenich	1	1	0	0	2	0	0	1	0	0	1	6

Sheet D	1	2	3	4	5	6	7	8	9	10	Final
(Ontario) Mike Harris 🔨	0	2	0	0	1	0	1	1	0	0	5
(Alberta) Kevin Martin	0	0	0	2	0	2	0	0	0	3	7

Sheet E	1	2	3	4	5	6	7	8	9	10	Final
(Manitoba) Dave Smith 🔨	1	0	0	1	0	0	X	X	X	X	2
(Manitoba) Jeff Stoughton	0	2	2	0	0	4	X	X	X	X	8

==== Draw 8 ====
Sheet A	1	2	3	4	5	6	7	8	9	10	Final
(Manitoba) Dave Smith 🔨	0	1	0	0	1	0	1	0	0	X	3
(Alberta) Kevin Martin	0	0	1	2	0	1	0	0	2	X	6

Sheet B	1	2	3	4	5	6	7	8	9	10	Final
(Manitoba) Kerry Burtnyk 🔨	2	0	0	1	0	0	2	0	0	X	5
(Alberta) Kevin Park	0	1	1	0	1	0	0	0	0	X	3

Sheet C	1	2	3	4	5	6	7	8	9	10	Final
(Ontario) Wayne Middaugh 🔨	1	0	1	0	1	0	0	1	2	0	6
(Manitoba) Jeff Stoughton	0	1	0	3	0	3	0	0	0	1	8

Sheet D	1	2	3	4	5	6	7	8	9	10	Final
(Ontario) Russ Howard 🔨	2	0	0	0	2	0	0	2	0	0	6
(Ontario) Ed Werenich	0	1	1	2	0	1	0	0	1	1	7

Sheet E	1	2	3	4	5	6	7	8	9	10	Final
(Ontario) Mike Harris 🔨	3	1	0	3	0	2	X	X	X	X	9
(Alberta) Brent MacDonald	0	0	1	0	2	0	X	X	X	X	3

==== Draw 9 ====
Sheet A	1	2	3	4	5	6	7	8	9	10	Final
(Manitoba) Jeff Stoughton 🔨	1	0	1	2	0	0	1	0	4	X	9
(Manitoba) Kerry Burtnyk	0	2	0	0	2	1	0	1	0	X	6

Sheet B	1	2	3	4	5	6	7	8	9	10	Final
(Alberta) Brent MacDonald 🔨	0	1	1	0	0	1	0	0	2	X	5
(Ontario) Russ Howard	1	0	0	1	1	0	2	2	0	X	7

Sheet C	1	2	3	4	5	6	7	8	9	10	11	Final
(Alberta) Kevin Park 🔨	0	1	0	2	0	0	1	0	0	2	0	6
(Ontario) Mike Harris	1	0	2	0	1	0	0	2	0	0	1	7

Sheet D	1	2	3	4	5	6	7	8	9	10	Final
(Alberta) Kevin Martin 🔨	2	0	0	1	1	0	0	2	0	1	7
(Ontario) Wayne Middaugh	0	0	1	0	0	1	1	0	2	0	5

Sheet E	1	2	3	4	5	6	7	8	9	10	Final
(Ontario) Ed Werenich 🔨	0	1	0	1	0	0	1	0	X	X	3
(Manitoba) Dave Smith	1	0	2	0	3	0	0	1	X	X	7

=== Playoffs ===
Semifinal		Final
		(Ontario) Mike Harris	6
(Alberta) Kevin Martin	9	(Alberta) Kevin Martin	5
(Ontario) Ed Werenich	6

==== Semi-final ====
Sheet B	1	2	3	4	5	6	7	8	9	10	Final
(Ontario) Ed Werenich 🔨	0	1	0	2	1	0	1	0	1	X	6
(Alberta) Kevin Martin	0	0	3	0	0	2	0	4	0	X	9

==== Final ====
Sheet B	1	2	3	4	5	6	7	8	9	10	Final
(Alberta) Kevin Martin	0	0	0	1	0	2	0	2	0	0	5
(Ontario) Mike Harris 🔨	0	1	2	0	1	0	1	0	0	1	6

== Women ==
=== Qualification ===
Qualification method	Qualifying team
Playoff between 1994 and 1995 Scott Tournament of Hearts champions	Sandra Schmirler
1996 Scott Tournament of Hearts champions	Marilyn Bodogh
Husky Classic winner	Shannon Kleibrink
Welton Beauchamp Classic winner	Sherry Sheirich
MT&T Mobility Classic winner	Mary Mattatall
SaskPower Classic winner	Anne Merklinger
Women's Curling Tour points	Kelley Owen (Law)
Women's Curling Tour points	Cathy Borst
1997 Scott Tournament of Hearts champions	~~Sandra Schmirler~~; Alison Goring (runner-up)
SaskPower Final Draw	Connie Laliberte

=== Teams ===
Skip	Third	Second	Lead	Alternate	Locale
Marilyn Bodogh	Kim Gellard	Corie Beveridge	Jane Hooper Perroud	Mary Gellard	St. Catharines CC, St. Catharines, Ontario
Cathy Borst	Heather Godberson	Brenda Bohmer	Kate Horne	Darrell Horne	Ottewell CC, Edmonton, Alberta
Alison Goring	Lori Eddy	Kim Moore	Mary Bowman	Yvonne Smith	Bayview G&CC, Thornhill, Ontario
Shannon Kleibrink	Glenys Bakker	Shannon Nimmo	Joanne Sipka	Sally Shigehiro	The Glencoe Club, Calgary, Alberta
Connie Laliberte	Cathy Overton-Clapham	Jill Staub	Janet Arnott	Maureen Bonar	Fort Rouge CC, Winnipeg, Manitoba
Kelley Law	Marla Geiger	Sherry Fraser	Christine Jurgenson	Lindsay Sparkes	Richmond WC, Richmond, British Columbia
Mary Mattatall	Angie Bryant	Lisa MacLeod	Heather Hopkins	Hayley Clarke	Mayflower CC, Halifax, Nova Scotia
Anne Merklinger	Theresa Breen	Patti McKnight	Audrey Frey	Christine McCrady	Rideau CC, Ottawa, Ontario
Sherry Scheirich	Colleen Zielke	Sandra Mulroney	Judy Leonard	Kimberly Ann Hodson	Granite CC, Saskatoon, Saskatchewan
Sandra Schmirler	Jan Betker	Joan McCusker	Marcia Gudereit	Atina Ford	Callie CC, Regina, Saskatchewan

=== Final standings ===
Skip	W	L
(Saskatchewan) Sandra Schmirler	7	2
(Alberta) Shannon Kleibrink	6	3
(British Columbia) Kelley Law	6	3
(Ontario) Anne Merklinger	5	4
(Alberta) Cathy Borst	5	4
(Ontario) Marilyn Bodogh	5	4
(Manitoba) Connie Laliberte	3	6
(Ontario) Alison Goring	3	6
(Saskatchewan) Sherry Scheirich	3	6
(Nova Scotia) Mary Mattatall	2	7

=== Scores ===
==== Draw 1 ====
Sheet A	1	2	3	4	5	6	7	8	9	10	Final
(British Columbia) Kelley Law 🔨	1	1	1	0	2	0	1	0	1	0	7
(Ontario) Alison Goring	0	0	0	2	0	1	0	1	0	0	4

Sheet B	1	2	3	4	5	6	7	8	9	10	Final
(Manitoba) Connie Laliberte 🔨	0	0	0	0	1	0	1	2	0	0	4
(Saskatchewan) Sandra Schmirler	1	0	0	0	0	2	0	0	2	1	6

Sheet C	1	2	3	4	5	6	7	8	9	10	Final
(Ontario) Marilyn Bodogh 🔨	0	1	0	1	0	0	2	0	1	0	5
(Alberta) Cathy Borst	1	0	1	0	2	0	0	4	0	0	8

Sheet D	1	2	3	4	5	6	7	8	9	10	Final
(Saskatchewan) Sherry Scheirich 🔨	0	0	1	0	0	0	0	0	X	X	1
(Alberta) Shannon Kleibrink	1	2	0	1	5	0	0	3	X	X	12

Sheet E	1	2	3	4	5	6	7	8	9	10	Final
(Nova Scotia) Mary Mattatall 🔨	1	0	0	1	0	0	0	1	0	X	3
(Ontario) Anne Merklinger	0	1	1	0	1	2	1	0	1	X	7

==== Draw 2 ====
Sheet A	1	2	3	4	5	6	7	8	9	10	Final
(Ontario) Marilyn Bodogh 🔨	1	0	0	0	0	2	0	1	0	X	4
(Ontario) Anne Merklinger	0	2	3	1	1	0	1	0	1	X	9

Sheet B	1	2	3	4	5	6	7	8	9	10	Final
(Saskatchewan) Sherry Scheirich 🔨	1	2	1	0	0	1	0	3	X	X	8
(Nova Scotia) Mary Mattatall	0	0	0	2	0	0	1	0	X	X	3

Sheet C	1	2	3	4	5	6	7	8	9	10	Final
(Manitoba) Connie Laliberte 🔨	1	0	1	0	0	0	0	2	0	X	4
(British Columbia) Kelley Law	0	1	0	2	0	1	3	0	1	X	8

Sheet D	1	2	3	4	5	6	7	8	9	10	Final
(Saskatchewan) Sandra Schmirler 🔨	0	2	0	0	0	1	0	1	0	X	4
(Alberta) Cathy Borst	1	0	0	1	1	0	2	0	2	X	7

Sheet E	1	2	3	4	5	6	7	8	9	10	Final
(Ontario) Alison Goring 🔨	0	0	1	0	0	0	0	1	1	X	3
(Alberta) Shannon Kleibrink	1	1	0	2	0	1	1	0	0	X	6

==== Draw 3 ====
Sheet A	1	2	3	4	5	6	7	8	9	10	Final
(Alberta) Cathy Borst 🔨	1	0	0	1	0	1	0	2	1	0	6
(Ontario) Alison Goring	0	1	1	0	2	0	1	0	0	2	7

Sheet B	1	2	3	4	5	6	7	8	9	10	Final
(Alberta) Shannon Kleibrink 🔨	0	1	0	1	0	1	0	0	X	X	3
(Ontario) Marilyn Bodogh	1	0	2	0	1	0	4	1	X	X	9

Sheet C	1	2	3	4	5	6	7	8	9	10	Final
(Ontario) Anne Merklinger 🔨	1	0	1	0	0	0	2	0	1	X	5
(Saskatchewan) Sherry Scheirich	0	3	0	2	1	1	0	1	0	X	8

Sheet D	1	2	3	4	5	6	7	8	9	10	Final
(Nova Scotia) Mary Mattatall 🔨	2	0	1	1	0	1	2	0	1	0	8
(Manitoba) Connie Laliberte	0	3	0	0	1	0	0	2	0	1	7

Sheet E	1	2	3	4	5	6	7	8	9	10	Final
(British Columbia) Kelley Law 🔨	1	0	0	1	0	0	1	0	2	X	5
(Saskatchewan) Sandra Schmirler	0	2	1	0	2	1	0	1	0	X	7

==== Draw 4 ====
Sheet A	1	2	3	4	5	6	7	8	9	10	Final
(Alberta) Shannon Kleibrink 🔨	0	1	0	1	0	2	0	0	1	0	5
(Saskatchewan) Sandra Schmirler	2	0	0	0	1	0	0	2	0	2	7

Sheet B	1	2	3	4	5	6	7	8	9	10	Final
(Alberta) Cathy Borst 🔨	2	0	0	1	0	1	1	0	2	0	7
(British Columbia) Kelley Law	0	3	3	0	0	0	0	1	0	3	10

Sheet C	1	2	3	4	5	6	7	8	9	10	Final
(Nova Scotia) Mary Mattatall 🔨	1	0	0	2	0	0	0	0	1	X	4
(Ontario) Marilyn Bodogh	0	1	2	0	1	0	3	1	0	X	8

Sheet D	1	2	3	4	5	6	7	8	9	10	Final
(Ontario) Anne Merklinger 🔨	0	1	0	1	1	1	0	0	1	X	5
(Ontario) Alison Goring	1	0	1	0	0	0	0	1	0	X	3

Sheet E	1	2	3	4	5	6	7	8	9	10	Final
(Saskatchewan) Sherry Scheirich 🔨	0	0	0	0	0	3	0	1	0	0	4
(Manitoba) Connie Laliberte	0	0	1	0	1	0	2	0	1	1	6

==== Draw 5 ====
Sheet A	1	2	3	4	5	6	7	8	9	10	Final
(Ontario) Marilyn Bodogh 🔨	1	0	1	0	0	2	0	1	1	0	6
(Saskatchewan) Sherry Scheirich	0	2	0	2	1	0	2	0	0	3	10

Sheet B	1	2	3	4	5	6	7	8	9	10	11	Final
(Saskatchewan) Sandra Schmirler 🔨	1	0	1	0	0	2	0	1	1	0	3	9
(Ontario) Anne Merklinger	0	2	0	1	1	0	1	0	0	1	0	6

Sheet C	1	2	3	4	5	6	7	8	9	10	Final
(Manitoba) Connie Laliberte 🔨	0	1	0	1	0	0	0	X	X	X	2
(Alberta) Cathy Borst	1	0	2	0	2	2	1	X	X	X	8

Sheet D	1	2	3	4	5	6	7	8	9	10	Final
(British Columbia) Kelley Law 🔨	1	0	0	0	0	5	0	0	1	0	7
(Alberta) Shannon Kleibrink	0	0	0	2	1	0	3	1	0	1	8

Sheet E	1	2	3	4	5	6	7	8	9	10	Final
(Ontario) Alison Goring 🔨	2	0	2	2	2	0	1	1	X	X	10
(Nova Scotia) Mary Mattatall	0	1	0	0	0	2	0	0	X	X	3

==== Draw 6 ====
Sheet A	1	2	3	4	5	6	7	8	9	10	Final
(British Columbia) Kelley Law 🔨	1	0	0	0	0	4	0	1	0	2	8
(Nova Scotia) Mary Mattatall	0	0	1	1	1	0	1	0	1	0	5

Sheet B	1	2	3	4	5	6	7	8	9	10	Final
(Manitoba) Connie Laliberte 🔨	1	0	2	0	1	0	1	0	0	X	5
(Alberta) Shannon Kleibrink	0	2	0	2	0	1	0	1	2	X	8

Sheet C	1	2	3	4	5	6	7	8	9	10	Final
(Saskatchewan) Sandra Schmirler 🔨	0	1	0	3	0	1	1	0	1	1	8
(Saskatchewan) Sherry Scheirich	0	0	2	0	2	0	0	1	0	0	5

Sheet D	1	2	3	4	5	6	7	8	9	10	Final
(Ontario) Alison Goring 🔨	1	0	0	2	0	0	1	1	0	0	5
(Ontario) Marilyn Bodogh	0	2	1	0	1	1	0	0	0	1	6

Sheet E	1	2	3	4	5	6	7	8	9	10	Final
(Alberta) Cathy Borst 🔨	1	0	0	1	0	2	0	1	1	2	8
(Ontario) Anne Merklinger	0	1	1	0	4	0	3	0	0	0	9

==== Draw 7 ====
Sheet A	1	2	3	4	5	6	7	8	9	10	Final
(Alberta) Shannon Kleibrink 🔨	1	0	0	1	0	1	0	1	0	0	4
(Alberta) Cathy Borst	0	0	1	0	1	0	1	0	0	2	5

Sheet B	1	2	3	4	5	6	7	8	9	10	Final
(Saskatchewan) Sherry Scheirich 🔨	0	1	0	0	0	1	0	2	X	X	4
(Ontario) Alison Goring	1	0	1	1	2	0	3	0	X	X	8

Sheet C	1	2	3	4	5	6	7	8	9	10	Final
(Ontario) Anne Merklinger 🔨	0	2	0	0	0	2	0	1	0	1	6
(British Columbia) Kelley Law	1	0	0	1	1	0	2	0	0	0	5

Sheet D	1	2	3	4	5	6	7	8	9	10	Final
(Nova Scotia) Mary Mattatall 🔨	1	0	1	0	1	0	0	1	0	0	4
(Saskatchewan) Sandra Schmirler	0	1	0	1	0	1	0	0	1	2	6

Sheet E	1	2	3	4	5	6	7	8	9	10	Final
(Ontario) Marilyn Bodogh 🔨	1	0	2	0	2	0	1	0	2	X	8
(Manitoba) Connie Laliberte	0	1	0	1	0	1	0	1	0	X	4

==== Draw 8 ====
Sheet A	1	2	3	4	5	6	7	8	9	10	Final
(Ontario) Marilyn Bodogh 🔨	1	0	0	0	1	1	0	3	2	X	8
(Saskatchewan) Sandra Schmirler	0	2	0	1	0	0	2	0	0	X	5

Sheet B	1	2	3	4	5	6	7	8	9	10	Final
(Ontario) Anne Merklinger 🔨	1	0	1	1	0	0	0	0	1	X	4
(Alberta) Shannon Kleibrink	0	1	0	0	1	2	0	4	0	X	8

Sheet C	1	2	3	4	5	6	7	8	9	10	Final
(Ontario) Alison Goring 🔨	0	0	1	0	0	0	1	2	1	0	5
(Manitoba) Connie Laliberte	1	1	0	0	1	4	0	0	0	1	8

Sheet D	1	2	3	4	5	6	7	8	9	10	Final
(Saskatchewan) Sherry Scheirich 🔨	0	0	1	1	0	1	0	1	0	1	5
(British Columbia) Kelley Law	0	4	0	0	1	0	1	0	1	0	7

Sheet E	1	2	3	4	5	6	7	8	9	10	Final
(Nova Scotia) Mary Mattatall 🔨	1	1	0	0	1	0	2	1	0	X	6
(Alberta) Cathy Borst	0	0	0	1	0	1	0	0	1	X	3

==== Draw 9 ====
Sheet A	1	2	3	4	5	6	7	8	9	10	Final
(Manitoba) Connie Laliberte 🔨	0	0	0	6	0	2	0	2	0	X	10
(Ontario) Anne Merklinger	0	1	3	0	1	0	2	0	1	X	8

Sheet B	1	2	3	4	5	6	7	8	9	10	Final
(Alberta) Cathy Borst 🔨	2	0	2	0	2	0	1	0	0	1	8
(Saskatchewan) Sherry Scheirich	0	1	0	1	0	2	0	1	1	0	6

Sheet C	1	2	3	4	5	6	7	8	9	10	Final
(Alberta) Shannon Kleibrink 🔨	0	0	1	0	1	0	1	3	0	1	7
(Nova Scotia) Mary Mattatall	0	1	0	1	0	2	0	0	1	0	5

Sheet D	1	2	3	4	5	6	7	8	9	10	Final
(Saskatchewan) Sandra Schmirler 🔨	1	0	4	2	0	4	X	X	X	X	11
(Ontario) Alison Goring	0	2	0	0	2	0	X	X	X	X	4

Sheet E	1	2	3	4	5	6	7	8	9	10	Final
(British Columbia) Kelley Law 🔨	0	0	0	1	0	1	2	1	0	1	6
(Ontario) Marilyn Bodogh	1	1	1	0	1	0	0	0	0	0	4

=== Playoffs ===
Semifinal		Final
		(Saskatchewan) Sandra Schmirler	9
(Alberta) Shannon Kleibrink	7	(Alberta) Shannon Kleibrink	6
(British Columbia) Kelley Law	4

==== Semi-final ====
Sheet C	1	2	3	4	5	6	7	8	9	10	Final
(Alberta) Shannon Kleibrink 🔨	1	0	0	0	1	0	0	4	0	1	7
(British Columbia) Kelley Law	0	0	1	0	0	0	2	0	1	0	4

==== Final ====
Sheet C	1	2	3	4	5	6	7	8	9	10	Final
(Alberta) Shannon Kleibrink	0	0	0	1	0	3	0	2	0	X	6
(Saskatchewan) Sandra Schmirler 🔨	0	0	2	0	1	0	3	0	3	X	9

== Sources ==
- 2017 Canadian Olympic Curling Trials Media Guide: 1997 Trials
