= 1994 Ontario Tankard =

- Host city: St. Thomas, Ontario
- Arena: St. Thomas-Elgin Memorial Arena
- Dates: February 8-13
- Winner: Team Howard
- Curling club: Penetanguishene Curling Club, Penetanguishene, Ontario
- Skip: Russ Howard
- Third: Glenn Howard
- Second: Wayne Middaugh
- Lead: Peter Corner
- Finalist: Axel Larsen (Guelph)

The 1994 Ontario Tankard, (known as the Blue Light Tankard for sponsorship reasons) the southern Ontario men's provincial curling championship was held February 8-13 at the St. Thomas-Elgin Memorial Arena in St. Thomas, Ontario. The winning rink of Russ Howard, Glenn Howard, Wayne Middaugh and Peter Corner from the Penetanguishene Curling Club would go on to represent Ontario at the 1994 Labatt Brier in Red Deer, Alberta.

Team Howard of Penetanguishene entered the event as the defending World Champions, having won the 1993 World Men's Curling Championship. They easily beat the Axel Larsen rink from Guelph in the final, 9–4, in front of 2,236 fans. The turning point in the game came in the fourth end, when Larsen accidentally bumped one of Howard's rocks into the rings on his first, which eventually resulted in a score of three for Howard in the end, taking a 5–1 lead. It was the eighth provincial championship for Howard.

There were rumours during the event that Howard would decline the opportunity to represent Ontario at the Brier due to a dispute over not being allowed to use their sponsors on their sweaters.

== Standings ==
Final standings

Key
Teams to Playoffs

Skip	Club	Wins	Losses
Russ Howard	Penetanguishene	8	2
Axel Larsen	Guelph	7	3
Doug Johnston	West Ottawa Granite	7	3
Ed Werenich	Churchill	6	4
Mike Altenhof	Chatham Granite	6	4
Ian Robertson	Thornhill	5	5
Peter Steski	Westmount	4	6
Ron Diguer	West Ottawa Granite	4	6
Bob Turcotte	Oshawa	3	7
John Base	Oakville	3	7
Bob Ray	Land O'Lakes	2	7

== Scores ==
=== February 8 ===
Draw 1

- Werenich 10, Altenhof 4
- Diguer 6, Turcotte 4
- Steski 7, Ray 3
- Base 9, Howard 6
- Robertson 7, Larsen 6

Draw 2

- Turcotte 10, Ray 3
- Larsen 8, Howard 5
- Werenich 7, Base 5
- Johnston 10, Altenhof 7
- Robertson 7, Diguer 4

=== February 9 ===
Draw 3

- Johnston 7, Base 6
- Howard 10, Diguer 1
- Ray 8, Robertson 4
- Steski 9, Turcotte 2
- Larsen 10, Werenich 8

Draw 4

- Robertson 9, Steski 8
- Werenich 7, Diguer 5
- Larsen 7, Johnston 5
- Altenhof 9, Base 2
- Howard 10, Ray 4

Draw 5

- Altenhof 7, Larsen 4
- Ray 9, Werenich 7
- Howard 6, Steski 2
- Turcotte 8, Robertson 6
- Johnston 9, Diguer 4

=== February 10 ===
Draw 6

- Howard 6, Turcotte 4
- Johnston 7, Ray 6
- Altenhof 7, Diguer 5
- Larsen 7, Base 4
- Werenich 7, Steski 5

Draw 7

- Diguer 10, Base 7
- Johnston 8, Steski 7
- Werenich 8, Turcotte 6
- Howard 9, Robertson 2
- Altenhof 7, Ray 4

=== February 11 ===
Draw 8

- Robertson 6, Werenich 5
- Steski 11, Altenhof 5
- Base 8, Ray 3
- Larsen 9, Diguer 6
- Johnston 10, Turcotte 5

Draw 9

- Larsen 8, Ray 6
- Altenhof 9, Turcotte 6
- Johnston 6, Robertson 3
- Howard 7, Werenich 4
- Base 9, Steski 7

Draw 10

- Howard 10, Johnston 6
- Turcotte 8, Base 5
- Steski 9, Larsen 8
- Diguer 9, Ray 4
- Altenhof 8, Robertson 5

=== February 11 ===
Draw 11

- Diguer 9, Steski 3
- Robertson 7, Base 2
- Howard 7, Altenhof 5
- Werenich 13, Johnston 8
- Larsen 13, Turcotte 6

== Playoffs ==
Semifinal			Final
			1	Russ Howard	9
2	Axel Larsen	9	2	Axel Larsen	4
3	Doug Johnston	3

=== Semifinal ===
February 12

Team	1	2	3	4	5	6	7	8	9	10	Final
Doug Johnston	0	0	1	0	1	0	1	0	X	X	3
Axel Larsen	0	1	0	2	0	3	0	3	X	X	9

=== Final ===
February 13

Team	1	2	3	4	5	6	7	8	9	10	Final
Axel Larsen	0	0	1	0	1	0	2	0	0	X	4
Russ Howard	2	0	0	3	0	1	0	2	1	X	9
