= Pat Perroud =

Canadian curler (born 1962)

- Curler ♂
- Born: December 31, 1962 (age 63); Thunder Bay, Ontario, Canada

Team
- Curling club: Fort William CC, Thunder Bay, ON, Avonlea CC, Toronto, ON, Churchill CC, Churchill, ON

Curling career
- Member Association: Northern Ontario, Ontario
- Brier: 4: (1985, 1990, 1995, 1997)
- World Championship: 2 (1985, 1990)
Medal record
Curling
Representing Canada
World Championships
| Gold medal – first place | 1985 Glasgow |
| Gold medal – first place | 1990 Västerås |
Labatt Brier
Representing Northern Ontario
| Gold medal – first place | 1985 Moncton |
Representing Ontario
| Gold medal – first place | 1990 Sault Ste. Marie |
Canadian Olympic Curling Trials
| Bronze medal – third place | 1997 Brandon |

Patrick C. Perroud (born December 31, 1962) is a Canadian curler, a two-time World Men's champion (1985, 1990) and a two-time Montana's Brier champion (1985, 1990).

He is one of the few curlers to win world titles with different skips: in 1985 with Al Hackner and in 1990 with Ed Werenich.

== Personal life ==
Perroud is married to Canadian and World curling champion Jane Hooper-Perroud. Originally from Thunder Bay, Perroud moved to Toronto after graduating from Lakehead University.

He started curling in 1973 when he was 11 years old.

== Awards ==
- Canadian Curling Hall of Fame: 1999

== Teams ==
| Season | Skip | Third | Second | Lead | Alternate | Events |
|---|---|---|---|---|---|---|
| 1984–85 | Al Hackner | Rick Lang | Ian Tetley | Pat Perroud | Bruce Kennedy (Brier) | Brier 1985 (gold); WCC 1985 (gold) |
| 1989–90 | Ed Werenich | John Kawaja | Ian Tetley | Pat Perroud | Neil Harrison | Brier 1990 (gold); WCC 1990 (gold) |
| 1994–95 | Ed Werenich | John Kawaja | Pat Perroud | Neil Harrison | Richard Hart | Brier 1995 (4th) |
| 1996–97 | Ed Werenich | John Kawaja | Pat Perroud | Neil Harrison | Peter Steski | Brier 1997 (4th) |
| 1997–98 | Ed Werenich | John Kawaja | Pat Perroud | Neil Harrison | Vic Peters | COCT 1997 (bronze) |
