= 1997 World Curling Tour Championship =

Curling world championship

1997 Apollo World Curling Tour Championship
- Host city: Winnipeg, Manitoba
- Arena: Granite Curling Club
- Dates: March 19–23
- Winner: (Ontario) Team Howard
- Curling club: MacTier CC, MacTier, Ontario
- Skip: Russ Howard
- Third: Glenn Howard
- Second: Scott Patterson
- Lead: Phil Loevenmark
- Finalist: (Saskatchewan) Randy Woytowich

The 1997 Apollo World Curling Tour Championship was held March 19–23, 1997 at the Granite Curling Club in Winnipeg, Manitoba. It was the 1997 edition of the Players' Championship, the championship of the men's World Curling Tour (WCT) for the 1996–97 curling season. The total purse for the event was $60,000, with the winning team receiving $14,000.

Russ Howard of Ontario defeated Saskatchewan's Randy Woytowich in the final, 9–5 to win the "Apollo Cup". Team Howard secured the victory by scoring a five-ender in the ninth, thanks to a couple of double takeouts by Russ' brother Glenn. With the victory, the team earned the last berth in the 1997 Canadian Olympic Curling Trials.

== Knockout rounds ==
The scores were as follows:

=== A event ===
First Knockout
(Manitoba) Vic Peters	6
(Saskatchewan) Brian Humble	7
(Manitoba) Dale Duguid	9
(Alberta) Darren Fish	4
(Saskatchewan) Brad Heidt	5
(Manitoba) Dave Boehmer	8
(Manitoba) John Bubbs	7
(British Columbia) Jay Peachey	2
(Saskatchewan) Doug Harcourt	6
(Saskatchewan) Eugene Hritzuk	5
(Manitoba) Brent Scales	8
(Manitoba) Dave Smith	9
(Ontario) Rich Moffatt	6
(Saskatchewan) Warren Hassall	1
(Manitoba) Kerry Burtnyk	8
(British Columbia) Brent Pierce	4

Quarterfinals
(Saskatchewan) Brian Humble	3
(Manitoba) Dale Duguid	5
(Manitoba) Dave Boehmer	6
(Manitoba) John Bubbs	4
(Saskatchewan) Doug Harcourt	4
(Manitoba) Dave Smith	8
(Ontario) Rich Moffatt	8
(Manitoba) Kerry Burtnyk	4

Semifinals
(Manitoba) Dale Duguid	5
(Manitoba) Dave Boehmer	7
(Manitoba) Dave Smith	6
(Ontario) Rich Moffatt	8

Qualifier 1
(Manitoba) Dave Boehmer	5
(Ontario) Rich Moffatt	6

First Knockout
(Manitoba) David Nedohin	6
(Ontario) Russ Howard	7
(Saskatchewan) Rod Montgomery	9
(Saskatchewan) Randy Woytowich	10
(Ontario) Bill Adams	8
(Ontario) Peter Corner	3
(British Columbia) Pat Ryan	2
(Saskatchewan) Jeff Hartung	9
(Alberta) Doran Johnson	9
(Alberta) Rob Bucholz	8
(Ontario) Al Hackner	7
(Alberta) Brent MacDonald	9
(United States) Pete Fenson	1
(Manitoba) Jeff Stoughton	11
(Saskatchewan) Rob Ewen	9
(Alberta) Shane Park	8

Quarterfinals
(Ontario) Russ Howard	10
(Saskatchewan) Randy Woytowich	2
(Ontario) Bill Adams	10
(Saskatchewan) Jeff Hartung	4
(Alberta) Doran Johnson	0
(Alberta) Brent MacDonald	6
(Manitoba) Jeff Stoughton	9
(Saskatchewan) Rob Ewen	5

Semifinals
(Ontario) Russ Howard	7
(Ontario) Bill Adams	8
(Alberta) Brent MacDonald	7
(Manitoba) Jeff Stoughton	6

Qualifier 2
(Ontario) Bill Adams	6
(Alberta) Brent MacDonald	7

=== B Event ===
Second Knockout
(Alberta) Rob Bucholz	3
(Ontario) Al Hackner	8
(United States) Pete Fenson	6
(Alberta) Shane Park	8
(Manitoba) David Nedohin	2
(Saskatchewan) Rod Montgomery	9
(British Columbia) Pat Ryan	8
(Ontario) Peter Corner	5

Round 2
(Saskatchewan) Jeff Hartung	4
(Ontario) Al Hackner	6
(Saskatchewan) Randy Woytowich	10
(Alberta) Shane Park	4
(Saskatchewan) Rob Ewen	6
(Saskatchewan) Rod Montgomery	2
(British Columbia) Pat Ryan	11
(Alberta) Doran Johnson	4

Quarterfinals
(Manitoba) Dale Duguid	8
(Ontario) Al Hackner	3
(Saskatchewan) Randy Woytowich	10
(Manitoba) Dave Smith	4
(Saskatchewan) Rob Ewen	3
(British Columbia) Pat Ryan	10

Semifinals
(Manitoba) Dale Duguid	7
(Saskatchewan) Randy Woytowich	3
(Ontario) Bill Adams	4
(British Columbia) Pat Ryan	8

Qualifier 3
(Manitoba) Dale Duguid	5
(British Columbia) Pat Ryan	2

Second Knockout
(British Columbia) Jay Peachey	8
(Saskatchewan) Brad Heidt	3
(Alberta) Darren Fish	3
(Manitoba) Vic Peters	6
(Manitoba) Brent Scales	W
(Saskatchewan) Eugene Hritzuk	L
(Saskatchewan) Warren Hassall	3
(British Columbia) Brent Pierce	5

Round 2
(British Columbia) Jay Peachey	3
(Manitoba) Kerry Burtnyk	10
(Saskatchewan) Doug Harcourt	8
(Manitoba) Vic Peters	6
(Manitoba) Brent Scales	5
(Saskatchewan) Brian Humble	4
(Manitoba) John Bubbs	4
(British Columbia) Brent Pierce	9

Quarterfinals
(Ontario) Russ Howard	5
(Manitoba) Kerry Burtnyk	7
(Saskatchewan) Doug Harcourt	6
(Manitoba) Jeff Stoughton	7
(Manitoba) Brent Scales	7
(British Columbia) Brent Pierce	3

Semifinals
(Manitoba) Kerry Burtnyk	3
(Manitoba) Jeff Stoughton	7
(Manitoba) Brent Scales	8
(Manitoba) Dave Boehmer	6

Qualifier 4
(Manitoba) Jeff Stoughton	7
(Manitoba) Brent Scales	1

=== C Event ===
Third Knockout
(Alberta) Rob Bucholz	3
(United States) Pete Fenson	8
(British Columbia) Jay Peachey	8
(Manitoba) Vic Peters	7

Quarterfinals
(Ontario) Russ Howard	8
(United States) Pete Fenson	3
(British Columbia) Jay Peachey	7
(British Columbia) Brent Pierce	5

Semifinals
(Ontario) Russ Howard	6
(British Columbia) Jay Peachey	4

Qualifier 5
(Ontario) Russ Howard	6
(British Columbia) Pat Ryan	4

Third Knockout
(Alberta) Darren Fish	1
(Saskatchewan) Brad Heidt	10

Quarterfinals
(Manitoba) Dave Smith	7
(Saskatchewan) Brad Heidt	2
(Manitoba) John Bubbs	9
(Saskatchewan) Brian Humble	8

Semifinals
(Manitoba) Dave Smith	8
(Manitoba) Dave Boehmer	2
(Manitoba) John Bubbs	5
(Manitoba) Kerry Burtnyk	6

Qualifier 6
(Manitoba) Dave Smith	5
(Manitoba) Kerry Burtnyk	7

Third Knockout
(Ontario) Peter Corner	7
(Manitoba) David Nedohin	2

Quarterfinals
(Ontario) Peter Corner	6
(Saskatchewan) Doug Harcourt	3
(Saskatchewan) Rod Montgomery	7
(Alberta) Doran Johnson	4

Semifinals
(Ontario) Peter Corner	7
(Saskatchewan) Randy Woytowich	8
(Saskatchewan) Rod Montgomery	5
(Ontario) Bill Adams	7

Qualifier 7
(Saskatchewan) Randy Woytowich	7
(Ontario) Bill Adams	5

Third Knockout
(Saskatchewan) Warren Hassall	7
(Saskatchewan) Eugene Hritzuk	2
(Saskatchewan) Jeff Hartung	W
(Alberta) Shane Park	3

Quarterfinals
(Saskatchewan) Warren Hassall	3
(Ontario) Al Hackner	8
(Saskatchewan) Jeff Hartung	4
(Saskatchewan) Rob Ewen	5

Semifinals
(Ontario) Al Hackner	6
(Saskatchewan) Rob Ewen	7

Qualifier 8
(Manitoba) Brent Scales	4
(Saskatchewan) Rob Ewen	3

== Playoffs ==
Quarterfinals
(Manitoba) Kerry Burtnyk	5
(Alberta) Brent MacDonald	7
(Manitoba) Dale Duguid	6
(Saskatchewan) Randy Woytowich	7
(Manitoba) Brent Scales	6
(Ontario) Russ Howard	7
(Ontario) Rich Moffatt	4
(Manitoba) Jeff Stoughton	5

Semifinals
(Alberta) Brent MacDonald	5
(Saskatchewan) Randy Woytowich	8
(Ontario) Russ Howard	7
(Manitoba) Jeff Stoughton	4

Finals
(Saskatchewan) Randy Woytowich	5
(Ontario) Russ Howard	9

=== Quarterfinals ===
Team	1	2	3	4	5	6	7	8	9	10	Final
(Manitoba) Kerry Burtnyk	0	1	0	1	0	2	1	0	0	X	5
(Alberta) Brent MacDonald	1	0	2	0	2	0	0	1	1	X	7

Team	1	2	3	4	5	6	7	8	9	10	Final
(Manitoba) Brent Scales	0	1	0	1	0	0	2	1	0	1	6
(Ontario) Russ Howard	1	0	1	0	3	1	0	0	1	0	7

Team	1	2	3	4	5	6	7	8	9	10	11	Final
(Ontario) Rich Moffatt	0	0	0	1	0	2	0	0	0	1	0	4
(Manitoba) Jeff Stoughton	0	1	1	0	1	0	0	1	0	0	1	5

Team	1	2	3	4	5	6	7	8	9	10	11	Final
(Manitoba) Dale Duguid	0	0	0	0	0	0	3	0	0	2	0	5
(Saskatchewan) Randy Woytowich	0	0	0	0	1	2	0	2	0	0	1	6

=== Semifinals ===
Team	1	2	3	4	5	6	7	8	9	10	Final
(Alberta) Brent MacDonald	0	0	2	2	0	1	0	0	0	0	5
(Saskatchewan) Randy Woytowich	1	1	0	0	1	0	1	1	1	2	8

Team	1	2	3	4	5	6	7	8	9	10	Final
(Ontario) Russ Howard	0	0	2	1	0	0	0	2	2	X	7
(Manitoba) Jeff Stoughton	0	3	0	0	0	1	0	0	0	X	4

=== Final ===
Team	1	2	3	4	5	6	7	8	9	10	Final
(Ontario) Russ Howard	0	3	0	0	0	0	1	0	5	X	9
(Saskatchewan) Randy Woytowich	1	0	0	1	0	1	0	2	0	X	5
