= Neil Harrison (curler) =

Canadian curler & coach (1949–2014)

- Curler
- Born: Neil Gordon Harrison; January 23, 1949; Peterborough, Ontario
- Died: February 24, 2014 (aged 65); Newmarket, Ontario

Curling career
- Member Association: Ontario
- Brier: 7 (1981, 1983, 1984, 1988, 1990, 1995, 1997)
- World Championship: 2 (1983, 1990)
Medal record
Representing Canada
World Curling Championships
Gold medal – first place	1983 Regina
Gold medal – first place	1990 Västerås
Representing Ontario
Labatt Brier
Gold medal – first place	1983 Sudbury
Gold medal – first place	1990 Sault Ste. Marie
Silver medal – second place	1984 Victoria
Bronze medal – third place	1988 Chicoutimi
Canadian Olympic Curling Trials
Bronze medal – third place	1987 Calgary
Bronze medal – third place	1997 Brandon

Neil Gordon "Harry" Harrison (January 23, 1949 – February 24, 2014) was a Canadian curler from Newmarket, Ontario. He was a six-time provincial champion, and two-time Canadian and World champion. He is considered to be one of the best leads of all time. He is recognized as having revolutionized the position with the use of the corner guard.

== Biography ==
Harrison was born in Peterborough, Ontario, on January 23, 1949 and began curling at age 12. Harrison's father Burritt was also a curler, having played lead for Ontario at the 1952 Macdonald Brier. Harrison also grew up in Peterborough.

Harrison was the long time lead for the Ed Werenich rink, but he played second for Werenich when they won their first provincial championship in 1981. The team, which also consisted of Bob Widdis at third and Jim McGrath at lead would represent Ontario at the 1981 Labatt Brier, where they finished 4th, following a tie breaker loss to Saskatchewan's Bob Ellert. The rink went 7–4 after the round robin. The following season however, the rink lost to Bruce Munro in the Ontario final. Following the loss, the Werenich rink brought on Ed's former skip Paul Savage to play third, and top junior John Kawaja to play second. Harrison would throw lead rocks. The new team would be nicknamed the "Dream Team" as the four were all skips. They were also known for their "insufferable ... beyond cocky [and] downright nasty" attitudes. However, the rink was very good, and they would end up not only winning the provincial championship, but also the 1983 Labatt Brier. They lost just one round robin game en route to winning the championship, defeating Alberta's Ed Lukowich in the final. The team represented Canada at the 1983 Air Canada Silver Broom, the world championship at the time. Again, the team lost just one match en route to winning the gold medal, defeating Germany's Keith Wendorf in the final. At the Worlds, Harrison became the first curler to play a perfect game. The team won their second straight provincial championship in 1984, and represented Ontario once again at the 1984 Labatt Brier. The team made it all the way to the Brier final, where they lost to Michael Riley of Manitoba in the final.

Following their success in the early 1980s, the team began to perform poorly. Kawaja was removed from the team, replaced by Graeme McCarrel, with Savage becoming skip, and Werenich throwing third. With Harrison, still playing lead, the team played in the 1987 Canadian Olympic Curling Trials, finishing third. The team went on to win the provincial championship again in 1988. At the 1988 Labatt Brier, the team finished third, after losing the semi-final to Saskatchewan's Eugene Hritzuk. Harrison would later become the team's alternate, when they won the 1990 Labatt Brier and 1990 World Men's Curling Championship. Harrison would only play in one game at the 1990 World Championship, in a match against the United States.

Into the early 1990s, Harrison once again played lead for the rink, with their 1990 lead Pat Perroud throwing second stones. With Savage now off the team, Kawaja was brought back to throw third stones. This new lineup won two provincial championships, in 1995 and 1997. At the 1995 Labatt Brier, the team made the playoffs after winning a tie breaker match against PEI's Robert Campbell. However, they were eliminated in their first playoff match against Alberta's Kevin Martin. The 1997 Labatt Brier would be Harrison's last. The team made it to the playoffs again, only to be eliminated in the playoffs, this time to New Brunswick's James Grattan.

Harrison was inducted into the Canadian Curling Hall of Fame in 1991. Outside of curling, Harrison was employed as a firefighter in Scarborough, Ontario, with the Toronto Fire Services. Harrison won numerous provincial firefighters curling championships, and won national firefighters curling championships in 1978, 1979, 1980, 1982, 1988, 1991, 1994, 2000, 2001 and 2007. Later in his life, he wrote for the Ontario Curling Report. He was named captain (not a playing position) of team North America at the 2011 Continental Cup. Harrison also coached the Scottish men's team at the 2004 World Championship and the U.S. women's team at the 2011 World Championship.

In 2009, Werenich, Savage, Kawaja and Harrison were inducted into the Ontario Sports Hall of Fame.

Harrison died from cancer at the age 65 on February 24, 2014, after having suffered from a series of strokes. He is survived by his wife Jane and two children, including Sean.
