= Scott Patterson (curler) =

Canadian curler (1969–2004)

- Curler
- Died: January 25, 2004 (aged 34); Sudbury, Ontario

Curling career
- Member Association: Northern Ontario; Ontario (1996–97)
- Brier: 2 (1994, 1999)

Scott C. Patterson (1969 – January 25, 2004) was a Canadian professional curler, from Pembroke, Ontario. Patterson was the only man to skip two North Bay rinks to the Brier - 1994 and '99. He also went was a member of the 1993 Northern Ontario mixed team, finishing third at the 1993 Canadian Mixed Curling Championship. Also, while attending university in Sudbury, at Laurentian University, he won the Ontario Universities' Championship. Scott Patterson was a longtime member of the North Bay Granite Club.

Scott had a wife, Tracy, and they had a daughter, Taylor, aged 5, and a son William, aged 2. Patterson was injured in a vehicle accident on January 23, 2004, while riding with Greg Cantin, John McClelland and Gerry Cantin, while on their way to attend the Northern Ontario Curling Association's challenge round. While the other passengers survived, Patterson died in Sudbury, Ontario, at St. Joseph's Health Care Centre at 10:30 AM Eastern Standard Time.

== Teams ==
Event	Skip	Third	Second	Lead	Alternate	Result
1994 Labatt Brier	Scott Patterson	Phil Loevenmark	John McClelland	Wayne Lowe	Rob Abrams	4th (7–4)
1997 Ontario Nokia Cup	Russ Howard	Glenn Howard	Scott Patterson	Phil Loevenmark		3rd (6–5)
1997 Canadian Olympic Curling Trials	Russ Howard	Glenn Howard	Scott Patterson	Phil Loevenmark	Larry Merkley	T8th (3–6)
1999 Labatt Brier	Scott Patterson	Phil Loevenmark	John McClelland	Wayne Lowe	Gilles Allaire	7th (6–5)
2000 Shorty Jenkins Classic	Scott Patterson	Greg Cantin	John McClelland	John Steski		1st
2003 Shorty Jenkins Classic	Scott Patterson	Greg Cantin	John McClelland	Gerry Cantin		2nd
