= George Karrys =

Canadian curler

- Curler
- Born: February 15, 1967 (age 59); Toronto, Ontario, Canada

Curling career
- Member Association: Ontario
- Olympic: 1 (1998)
Medal record
Men's curling
Representing Canada
Olympic Games
Silver medal – second place	1998 Nagano	Team
Representing Ontario
Canadian Olympic Curling Trials
Gold medal – first place	1997 Brandon

George Karrys (born February 15, 1967) is a Canadian retired curler and journalist. He won a silver medal at the 1998 Winter Olympics in Nagano with Mike Harris, Richard Hart, and Collin Mitchell.

Karrys is the former owner of and current Editor-In-Chief of The Curling News, now owned by Roustan Media in partnership with Sports Illustrated as well as the former World Curling Federation media relations officer. Karrys was also the technical consultant for the movie Men with Brooms and also played Barnhart in the movie.

== Career ==
Karrys played most of his career with skip Mike Harris. He won the Ontario provincial junior championship with Harris in 1986. Karrys, with Harris, recorded a surprise victory over Kevin Martin at the 1997 Canadian Olympic Curling Trials, and went on to represent Canada at the 1998 Winter Olympics. They went undefeated until the final, where they lost to Switzerland's Patrick Hürlimann.

Karrys also participated in five Ontario men's provincial championships with Harris, finishing twice as runner-up, and won various World Curling Tour events. The team disbanded in 2000. Karrys retired in about 2003.

=== Coaching career ===
Karrys served as the coach for the Andorran teams at the 2002 European Curling Championships skipped by Josep Duro and Ana Arce.
