= 1990 Labatt Brier =

- Host city: Sault Ste. Marie, Ontario
- Arena: Sault Memorial Gardens
- Dates: March 4–11
- Attendance: 76,878
- Winner: Ontario
- Curling club: Avonlea CC, Toronto
- Skip: Ed Werenich
- Third: John Kawaja
- Second: Ian Tetley
- Lead: Pat Perroud
- Alternate: Neil Harrison
- Finalist: New Brunswick (Jim Sullivan)

The 1990 Labatt Brier, the Canadian men's curling championship, was held from March 4 to 11 in Sault Ste. Marie, Ontario.

Ed Werenich of Ontario defeated Jim Sullivan of New Brunswick to win his second Brier.

The runner-up finish by New Brunswick was their best Brier finish since the inaugural Brier back in 1927 where they also finished runner-up.

== Teams ==
Alberta	British Columbia	Manitoba
North Hill CC, Calgary Skip: Harold Breckenridge; Third: Jim McDonald; Second: Ron Fulkerth; Lead: Dennis Balderston; Alternate: Stu Erickson	Vancouver CC, Vancouver Skip: Craig Lepine; Third: Ross Graham; Second: Mike Bradley; Lead: Glen McEachran; Alternate: Brent Giles	Deloraine CC Skip: Duane Edwards; Third: Kelly McMechan; Second: Don Williams; Lead: Jack Edwards; Alternate: Phil Edwards
New Brunswick	Newfoundland	Northern Ontario
Capital WC, Fredericton Skip: Jim Sullivan; Third: Charlie Sullivan; Second: Craig Burgess; Lead: Paul Power; Alternate: Dan Alderman	St. John's CC, St. John's Skip: Glenn Goss; Third: Geoff Cunningham; Second: John Allan; Lead: Neil Young; Alternate: Gary Tiller	Soo Curlers Association, Sault Ste. Marie Skip: Al Harnden; Third: Eric Harnden; Second: Rich Evoy; Lead: Frank Caputo; Alternate: Rollie Ralph
Nova Scotia	Ontario	Prince Edward Island
Dartmouth CC, Dartmouth Skip: Alan Darragh; Third: Peter MacPhee; Second: Dave Wallace; Lead: Brad McCaughan; Alternate: Steve Johnston	Avonlea CC, Toronto Skip: Ed Werenich; Third: John Kawaja; Second: Ian Tetley; Lead: Pat Perroud; Alternate: Neil Harrison	Crapaud CC, Crapaud Skip: Ted MacFadyen; Third: Bill MacFadyen; Second: Mike Coady; Lead: Sandy Foy; Alternate: Dave MacFadyen
Quebec	Saskatchewan	Yukon/Northwest Territories
Glenmore CC, Montréal Skip: Kevin Adams; Third: Rob MacLean; Second: Malcolm Turner; Lead: Don Reddick; Alternate: Andrew Carter	Kronau CC, Kronau Skip: Jamie Schneider; Third: Rick Schneider; Second: Mike Schneider; Lead: Larry Schneider; Alternate: Daryl Nixon	Yellowknife CC, Yellowknife Skip: Trevor Alexander; Third: Richard Robertson; Second: Brad Robertson; Lead: Clay Ravndal; Alternate: Bill Strain

== Map of teams ==
Provincial Winners

== Round robin standings ==
Key
Teams to Playoffs
Teams to Tiebreaker

Province	Skip	W	L	Shot %
Ontario	Ed Werenich	10	1	88
Northern Ontario	Al Harnden	8	3	81
New Brunswick	Jim Sullivan	6	5	83
Saskatchewan	Jamie Schneider	6	5	84
Nova Scotia	Alan Darragh	5	6	82
Prince Edward Island	Ted MacFadyen	5	6	81
British Columbia	Craig Lepine	5	6	79
Quebec	Kevin Adams	5	6	82
Newfoundland	Glenn Goss	5	6	80
Alberta	Harold Breckenridge	4	7	80
Manitoba	Duane Edwards	4	7	82
Yukon/Northwest Territories	Trevor Alexander	3	8	80

== Round robin results ==
=== Draw 1 ===
Sheet A	1	2	3	4	5	6	7	8	9	10	11	Final
British Columbia (Lepine) 🔨	2	0	0	0	0	2	0	1	0	2	0	7
Nova Scotia (Darragh)	0	1	1	1	1	0	1	0	2	0	1	8

Sheet B	1	2	3	4	5	6	7	8	9	10	Final
Quebec (Adams) 🔨	1	0	1	0	1	0	0	1	0	0	4
Prince Edward Island (MacFadyen)	0	0	0	1	0	2	0	0	2	1	6

Sheet C	1	2	3	4	5	6	7	8	9	10	Final
Saskatchewan (Schneider) 🔨	1	1	0	0	1	0	1	1	0	X	5
Northern Ontario (Harnden)	0	0	3	2	0	1	0	0	2	X	8

Sheet D	1	2	3	4	5	6	7	8	9	10	Final
Yukon/Northwest Territories (Alexander) 🔨	0	1	1	0	1	0	2	2	0	0	7
Manitoba (Edwards)	0	0	0	2	0	0	0	0	3	1	6

Sheet E	1	2	3	4	5	6	7	8	9	10	Final
New Brunswick (Sullivan) 🔨	0	0	0	1	0	1	0	1	0	X	3
Ontario (Werenich)	1	0	0	0	4	0	2	0	1	X	8

=== Draw 2 ===
Sheet A	1	2	3	4	5	6	7	8	9	10	Final
New Brunswick (Sullivan) 🔨	2	0	0	1	0	2	0	0	1	X	6
Manitoba (Edwards)	0	1	0	0	1	0	0	2	0	X	4

Sheet B	1	2	3	4	5	6	7	8	9	10	Final
Northern Ontario (Harnden) 🔨	1	0	0	0	2	1	0	2	0	2	8
Yukon/Northwest Territories (Alexander)	0	2	1	1	0	0	1	0	2	0	7

Sheet C	1	2	3	4	5	6	7	8	9	10	Final
Nova Scotia (Darragh) 🔨	1	0	0	0	1	0	0	2	0	0	4
Ontario (Werenich)	0	1	1	1	0	1	1	0	0	1	6

Sheet D	1	2	3	4	5	6	7	8	9	10	Final
British Columbia (Lepine) 🔨	1	0	0	0	2	0	0	0	1	0	4
Saskatchewan (Schneider)	0	0	1	1	0	0	2	1	0	1	6

Sheet E	1	2	3	4	5	6	7	8	9	10	Final
Newfoundland (Goss) 🔨	1	0	4	0	1	2	0	1	0	1	10
Alberta (Breckenridge)	0	2	0	1	0	0	3	0	2	0	8

=== Draw 3 ===
Sheet C	1	2	3	4	5	6	7	8	9	10	Final
Northern Ontario (Harnden) 🔨	2	0	2	0	2	0	3	0	1	X	10
British Columbia (Lepine)	0	1	0	2	0	0	0	2	0	X	5

Sheet D	1	2	3	4	5	6	7	8	9	10	Final
Saskatchewan (Schneider) 🔨	1	0	3	0	2	0	0	0	1	X	7
Nova Scotia (Darragh)	0	2	0	1	0	1	0	0	0	X	4

=== Draw 4 ===
Sheet A	1	2	3	4	5	6	7	8	9	10	Final
Saskatchewan (Schneider) 🔨	1	0	1	0	0	2	3	0	X	X	7
Yukon/Northwest Territories (Alexander)	0	1	0	0	1	0	0	0	X	X	2

Sheet B	1	2	3	4	5	6	7	8	9	10	Final
Ontario (Werenich) 🔨	0	1	1	0	0	2	0	0	3	X	7
Newfoundland (Goss)	0	0	0	0	1	0	1	0	0	X	2

Sheet C	1	2	3	4	5	6	7	8	9	10	Final
Manitoba (Edwards) 🔨	1	0	1	0	0	3	0	0	2	X	7
Prince Edward Island (MacFadyen)	0	1	0	1	1	0	1	0	0	X	4

Sheet D	1	2	3	4	5	6	7	8	9	10	11	Final
New Brunswick (Sullivan) 🔨	2	0	1	2	0	0	0	0	1	0	1	7
Alberta (Breckenridge)	0	2	0	0	1	0	1	1	0	1	0	6

Sheet E	1	2	3	4	5	6	7	8	9	10	Final
Northern Ontario (Harnden) 🔨	0	0	0	0	2	0	0	1	0	2	5
Quebec (Adams)	0	0	0	2	0	1	0	0	1	0	4

=== Draw 5 ===
Sheet A	1	2	3	4	5	6	7	8	9	10	11	Final
Prince Edward Island (MacFadyen) 🔨	1	0	0	0	2	0	0	1	0	2	0	6
Ontario (Werenich)	0	0	2	0	0	1	2	0	1	0	1	7

Sheet B	1	2	3	4	5	6	7	8	9	10	Final
Alberta (Breckenridge) 🔨	0	2	0	1	0	1	0	1	0	2	7
Manitoba (Edwards)	0	0	2	0	3	0	0	0	1	0	6

Sheet C	1	2	3	4	5	6	7	8	9	10	11	Final
Newfoundland (Goss) 🔨	1	0	0	2	1	1	0	0	1	0	1	7
New Brunswick (Sullivan)	0	1	0	0	0	0	2	1	0	2	0	6

Sheet D	1	2	3	4	5	6	7	8	9	10	Final
Nova Scotia (Darragh) 🔨	1	0	2	0	0	0	0	1	0	0	4
Quebec (Adams)	0	3	0	0	0	0	1	0	0	2	6

Sheet E	1	2	3	4	5	6	7	8	9	10	11	Final
Yukon/Northwest Territories (Alexander) 🔨	0	1	1	0	2	0	0	1	0	1	0	6
British Columbia (Lepine)	0	0	0	2	0	2	0	0	2	0	1	7

=== Draw 6 ===
Sheet B	1	2	3	4	5	6	7	8	9	10	11	Final
Yukon/Northwest Territories (Alexander) 🔨	0	2	0	0	1	1	0	1	0	1	0	6
New Brunswick (Sullivan)	1	0	1	1	0	0	1	0	2	0	1	7

Sheet C	1	2	3	4	5	6	7	8	9	10	Final
Ontario (Werenich) 🔨	1	0	3	0	0	0	0	0	1	X	5
Manitoba (Edwards)	0	1	0	1	0	0	0	0	0	X	2

=== Draw 7 ===
Sheet A	1	2	3	4	5	6	7	8	9	10	Final
Northern Ontario (Harnden) 🔨	0	1	0	2	2	2	0	3	X	X	10
Alberta (Breckenridge)	0	0	1	0	0	0	2	0	X	X	3

Sheet B	1	2	3	4	5	6	7	8	9	10	Final
Saskatchewan (Schneider) 🔨	1	0	0	1	0	0	0	2	0	X	4
Ontario (Werenich)	0	2	0	0	2	1	0	0	2	X	7

Sheet C	1	2	3	4	5	6	7	8	9	10	11	Final
Quebec (Adams) 🔨	1	1	0	0	1	0	1	0	0	1	0	5
Yukon/Northwest Territories (Alexander)	0	0	2	1	0	1	0	1	0	0	1	6

Sheet D	1	2	3	4	5	6	7	8	9	10	Final
Newfoundland (Goss) 🔨	1	0	0	0	0	1	0	1	0	X	3
British Columbia (Lepine)	0	0	0	2	2	0	2	0	1	X	7

Sheet E	1	2	3	4	5	6	7	8	9	10	Final
Prince Edward Island (MacFadyen) 🔨	1	2	0	0	0	0	0	1	0	0	4
Nova Scotia (Darragh)	0	0	3	0	0	1	1	0	0	1	6

=== Draw 8 ===
Sheet A	1	2	3	4	5	6	7	8	9	10	Final
Quebec (Adams) 🔨	1	0	0	0	0	3	0	1	0	1	6
Newfoundland (Goss)	0	1	0	2	0	0	0	0	2	0	5

Sheet B	1	2	3	4	5	6	7	8	9	10	Final
Nova Scotia (Darragh) 🔨	2	0	0	2	0	1	0	2	3	X	10
Alberta (Breckenridge)	0	0	1	0	1	0	1	0	0	X	3

Sheet C	1	2	3	4	5	6	7	8	9	10	Final
Prince Edward Island (MacFadyen) 🔨	0	0	0	3	3	1	0	1	X	X	8
British Columbia (Lepine)	0	0	1	0	0	0	1	0	X	X	2

Sheet D	1	2	3	4	5	6	7	8	9	10	Final
New Brunswick (Sullivan) 🔨	0	1	0	0	1	0	0	2	1	X	5
Northern Ontario (Harnden)	0	0	0	1	0	2	0	0	0	X	3

Sheet E	1	2	3	4	5	6	7	8	9	10	11	Final
Saskatchewan (Schneider) 🔨	1	0	0	2	0	2	0	0	2	1	0	8
Manitoba (Edwards)	0	1	1	0	4	0	2	0	0	0	1	9

=== Draw 9 ===
Sheet C	1	2	3	4	5	6	7	8	9	10	Final
Quebec (Adams) 🔨	1	0	1	1	0	1	0	0	0	1	5
Alberta (Breckenridge)	0	1	0	0	1	0	1	0	1	0	4

Sheet D	1	2	3	4	5	6	7	8	9	10	Final
Prince Edward Island (MacFadyen) 🔨	2	0	2	0	0	0	3	0	1	X	8
Newfoundland (Goss)	0	1	0	0	1	1	0	1	0	X	4

=== Draw 10 ===
Sheet A	1	2	3	4	5	6	7	8	9	10	Final
Nova Scotia (Darragh) 🔨	1	0	1	0	0	2	0	1	0	2	7
New Brunswick (Sullivan)	0	1	0	0	1	0	2	0	2	0	6

Sheet B	1	2	3	4	5	6	7	8	9	10	Final
Manitoba (Edwards) 🔨	0	1	2	0	2	1	0	0	0	X	6
British Columbia (Lepine)	0	0	0	1	0	0	0	1	1	X	3

Sheet C	1	2	3	4	5	6	7	8	9	10	11	Final
Yukon/Northwest Territories (Alexander) 🔨	1	0	0	1	2	0	0	1	0	1	0	6
Newfoundland (Goss)	0	1	1	0	0	2	0	0	2	0	1	7

Sheet D	1	2	3	4	5	6	7	8	9	10	Final
Saskatchewan (Schneider) 🔨	1	0	0	0	2	0	1	0	0	1	5
Alberta (Breckenridge)	0	0	0	1	0	2	0	1	0	0	4

Sheet E	1	2	3	4	5	6	7	8	9	10	11	Final
Ontario (Werenich) 🔨	1	0	1	0	1	0	1	1	0	0	1	6
Northern Ontario (Harnden)	0	1	0	1	0	1	0	0	0	2	0	5

=== Draw 11 ===
Sheet A	1	2	3	4	5	6	7	8	9	10	11	Final
Manitoba (Edwards) 🔨	0	1	0	0	0	1	0	0	1	1	0	4
Northern Ontario (Harnden)	0	0	2	0	0	0	2	0	0	0	1	5

Sheet B	1	2	3	4	5	6	7	8	9	10	Final
Prince Edward Island (MacFadyen) 🔨	0	0	0	1	1	0	1	0	0	2	5
Saskatchewan (Schneider)	0	0	0	0	0	2	0	2	0	0	4

Sheet C	1	2	3	4	5	6	7	8	9	10	Final
British Columbia (Lepine) 🔨	1	0	1	0	2	0	2	0	0	1	7
Ontario (Werenich)	0	1	0	2	0	1	0	0	1	0	5

Sheet D	1	2	3	4	5	6	7	8	9	10	Final
Quebec (Adams) 🔨	1	0	2	0	0	0	2	0	0	1	6
New Brunswick (Sullivan)	0	1	0	0	2	0	0	1	1	0	5

Sheet E	1	2	3	4	5	6	7	8	9	10	Final
Nova Scotia (Darragh) 🔨	1	0	0	0	0	1	0	2	1	0	5
Yukon/Northwest Territories (Alexander)	0	0	0	4	1	0	1	0	0	0	6

=== Draw 12 ===
Sheet A	1	2	3	4	5	6	7	8	9	10	Final
Yukon/Northwest Territories (Alexander) 🔨	0	1	0	1	0	1	0	0	0	X	3
Prince Edward Island (MacFadyen)	1	0	1	0	2	0	0	0	2	X	6

Sheet B	1	2	3	4	5	6	7	8	9	10	Final
Newfoundland (Goss) 🔨	0	1	0	1	0	1	0	0	1	0	4
Nova Scotia (Darragh)	2	0	1	0	1	0	1	0	0	0	5

Sheet C	1	2	3	4	5	6	7	8	9	10	11	Final
Manitoba (Edwards) 🔨	1	0	0	1	1	0	0	1	2	1	0	7
Quebec (Adams)	0	2	0	0	0	0	5	0	0	0	1	8

Sheet D	1	2	3	4	5	6	7	8	9	10	Final
Alberta (Breckenridge) 🔨	0	1	0	1	0	0	0	2	0	0	4
Ontario (Werenich)	0	0	3	0	0	1	1	0	0	3	8

Sheet E	1	2	3	4	5	6	7	8	9	10	Final
British Columbia (Lepine) 🔨	1	2	1	0	3	0	1	1	X	X	9
New Brunswick (Sullivan)	0	0	0	1	0	1	0	0	X	X	2

=== Draw 13 ===
Sheet A	1	2	3	4	5	6	7	8	9	10	11	Final
Ontario (Werenich) 🔨	0	0	0	2	0	0	2	0	0	0	1	5
Quebec (Adams)	0	0	1	0	0	1	0	0	0	2	0	4

Sheet B	1	2	3	4	5	6	7	8	9	10	Final
New Brunswick (Sullivan) 🔨	0	1	0	0	2	0	2	1	0	1	7
Saskatchewan (Schneider)	0	0	0	2	0	1	0	0	2	0	5

Sheet C	1	2	3	4	5	6	7	8	9	10	Final
Alberta (Breckenridge) 🔨	3	0	1	0	2	0	1	0	0	1	8
Yukon/Northwest Territories (Alexander)	0	1	0	2	0	2	0	1	1	0	7

Sheet D	1	2	3	4	5	6	7	8	9	10	Final
Northern Ontario (Harnden) 🔨	0	1	0	1	0	0	2	1	0	1	6
Prince Edward Island (MacFadyen)	1	0	2	0	1	0	0	0	1	0	5

Sheet E	1	2	3	4	5	6	7	8	9	10	Final
Manitoba (Edwards) 🔨	0	2	0	1	0	0	1	0	0	0	4
Newfoundland (Goss)	1	0	1	0	0	1	0	1	0	2	6

=== Draw 14 ===
Sheet A	1	2	3	4	5	6	7	8	9	10	Final
Alberta (Breckenridge) 🔨	1	1	0	0	1	0	0	1	0	1	5
British Columbia (Lepine)	0	0	1	0	0	1	0	0	1	0	3

Sheet B	1	2	3	4	5	6	7	8	9	10	Final
Newfoundland (Goss) 🔨	2	2	0	1	0	3	0	2	0	X	10
Northern Ontario (Harnden)	0	0	2	0	2	0	2	0	2	X	8

Sheet C	1	2	3	4	5	6	7	8	9	10	11	Final
New Brunswick (Sullivan) 🔨	0	1	0	0	0	0	0	0	0	0	1	2
Prince Edward Island (MacFadyen)	0	0	0	1	0	0	0	0	0	0	0	1

Sheet D	1	2	3	4	5	6	7	8	9	10	Final
Manitoba (Edwards) 🔨	2	1	0	1	0	0	3	1	0	X	8
Nova Scotia (Darragh)	0	0	1	0	2	1	0	0	1	X	5

Sheet E	1	2	3	4	5	6	7	8	9	10	Final
Quebec (Adams) 🔨	1	0	0	0	1	0	0	0	1	0	3
Saskatchewan (Schneider)	0	1	1	0	0	0	0	2	0	1	5

=== Draw 15 ===
Sheet A	1	2	3	4	5	6	7	8	9	10	Final
Newfoundland (Goss) 🔨	0	0	1	0	1	0	1	1	0	0	4
Saskatchewan (Schneider)	0	0	0	2	0	2	0	0	0	2	6

Sheet B	1	2	3	4	5	6	7	8	9	10	Final
British Columbia (Lepine) 🔨	0	0	0	2	1	1	1	0	1	X	6
Quebec (Adams)	0	2	0	0	0	0	0	0	0	X	3

Sheet C	1	2	3	4	5	6	7	8	9	10	Final
Northern Ontario (Harnden) 🔨	2	0	1	2	0	1	0	0	0	1	7
Nova Scotia (Darragh)	0	1	0	0	2	0	0	2	1	0	6

Sheet D	1	2	3	4	5	6	7	8	9	10	Final
Ontario (Werenich) 🔨	1	0	1	0	5	1	0	2	0	X	10
Yukon/Northwest Territories (Alexander)	0	2	0	1	0	0	3	0	1	X	7

Sheet E	1	2	3	4	5	6	7	8	9	10	Final
Alberta (Breckenridge) 🔨	3	1	0	1	0	2	0	1	0	X	8
Prince Edward Island (MacFadyen)	0	0	1	0	1	0	2	0	1	X	5

== Tiebreaker ==
Sheet C	1	2	3	4	5	6	7	8	9	10	Final
New Brunswick (Sullivan) 🔨	1	0	0	0	4	0	1	0	0	1	7
Saskatchewan (Schneider)	0	0	1	0	0	2	0	2	1	0	6

Player Percentages
New Brunswick		Saskatchewan	
Paul Power	72%	Larry Schneider	93%
Craig Burgess	88%	Mike Schneider	81%
Charlie Sullivan	80%	Rick Schneider	70%
Jim Sullivan	82%	Jamie Schneider	85%
Total	81%	Total	82%

== Playoffs ==
Semifinal			Final
			1	Ontario	5
2	Northern Ontario	4	3	New Brunswick	4
3	New Brunswick	5

=== Semifinal ===
Sheet C	1	2	3	4	5	6	7	8	9	10	Final
Northern Ontario (Harnden) 🔨	0	0	1	0	0	1	0	2	0	0	4
New Brunswick (Sullivan)	0	0	0	1	1	0	2	0	0	1	5

Player Percentages
Northern Ontario		New Brunswick	
Frank Caputo	84%	Paul Power	71%
Rich Evoy	70%	Craig Burgess	80%
Eric Harnden	73%	Charlie Sullivan	83%
Al Harnden	68%	Jim Sullivan	82%
Total	74%	Total	79%

=== Final ===
Sheet C	1	2	3	4	5	6	7	8	9	10	Final
Ontario (Werenich) 🔨	0	3	0	0	1	0	0	0	0	1	5
New Brunswick (Sullivan)	1	0	0	1	0	0	0	0	2	0	4

Player Percentages
Ontario		New Brunswick	
Pat Perroud	96%	Paul Power	83%
Ian Tetley	82%	Craig Burgess	86%
John Kawaja	86%	Jim Sullivan	68%
Ed Werenich	88%	Charlie Sullivan	94%
Total	88%	Total	83%

== Statistics ==
=== Top 5 player percentages ===
Round Robin only

Leads	%
(Ontario) Pat Perroud	88
(Quebec) Andrew Carter	87
(Manitoba) Jack Edwards	86
(British Columbia) Glen McEachran	85
(New Brunswick) Paul Power	85

Seconds	%
(Ontario) Ian Tetley	87
(Nova Scotia) Dave Wallace	87
(Saskatchewan) Mike Schneider	86
(New Brunswick) Craig Burgess	85
(Newfoundland and Labrador) John Allan	84

Thirds	%
(Ontario) John Kawaja	86
(Northern Ontario) Eric Harnden	85
(Saskatchewan) Rick Schneider	83
(Manitoba) Kelly McMechan	82
(New Brunswick) Charlie Sullivan	81

Skips	%
(Ontario) Ed Werenich	90
(Saskatchewan) Jamie Schneider	83
(Prince Edward Island) Ted MacFadyen	83
(Nova Scotia) Alan Darragh	82
(Manitoba) Duane Edwards	81

=== Team percentages ===
Round Robin only

Province	Skip	%
Ontario	Ed Werenich	88
Saskatchewan	Jamie Schneider	84
New Brunswick	Jim Sullivan	83
Manitoba	Duane Edwards	82
Nova Scotia	Alan Darragh	82
Quebec	Kevin Adams	82
Prince Edward Island	Ted MacFadyen	81
Northern Ontario	Al Harnden	81
Alberta	Harold Breckenridge	80
Yukon/Northwest Territories	Trevor Alexander	80
Newfoundland	Glenn Goss	80
British Columbia	Craig Lepine	79
