= Royal Kingston Curling Club =

Curling club in Kingston, Ontario, Canada

- Location: Kingston, Ontario
- Arena: 130 Days Road, Kingston, Ontario, Canada; 44.2°N,76.6°W

Information
- Established: 1820
- Sheets of ice: 6
- Rock colours: red and blue
- Website: www.royalkingston.com

Royal Kingston Curling Club is a curling club located in Kingston, Ontario, Canada. It was founded in 1820 and is recognized as one of the oldest curling clubs in Canada. The club received royal patronage in 1993.

The Royal Kingston Curling Club, or "RKCC", offers a wide variety of social, recreational, and competitive programs to its members. The club was located on Clergy Street, in central Kingston, close to Queen's University, for nearly a century, opening there in 1923.Moving in 2005, it moved to its current location on Days Road, just north of Front Road, in west-end Kingston, as part of a deal with the university, which was expanding and wanted the land occupied by KCC.

The 1960 Ontario British Consols provincial men's champion rink, skipped by Jake (J.F.) Edwards, with members Bob Elliott, Joe Corkey, and George Binnington, played out of KCC.

As part of its 200th anniversary celebrations, the RKCC will be assisting with hosting the 2020 Tim Hortons Brier. The Brier is the national men's curling championship, and an estimated 130,000 spectators are expected to attend the games.
