= Graeme McCarrel =

Canadian curler

- Curler

Team
- Curling club: Brampton CC, Brampton

Curling career
- Member Association: Ontario
- Brier: 4 (1988, 1998, 2001, 2005)
Medal record
Men's Curling
World Curling Championships
Gold medal – first place	1998 Kamloops

Graeme McCarrel (born November 27, 1960) is a Canadian curler from Brampton, Ontario. He is a former Brier and World Champion.

In 1980, as a junior, McCarrel played third for John Kawaja. They lost in the finals of the Canadian Junior Curling Championships that year. After juniors, McCarrel moved to play with veteran Paul Savage. McCarrel won his first provincial title in 1988, playing second for Savage.

McCarrel then moved to play third for Wayne Middaugh. With Middaugh, McCarrel won three more provincial championships, in 1998, 2001 and 2005. In 1998 the team won the Brier, and the World Curling Championships.

McCarrel would later leave the Middaugh rink. In 2008, he was picked up to play with Middaugh's cousin, Peter Corner to play as his third.
