= Ian Tetley =

Canadian curler & coach (born 1962)

- Curler
- Born: August 14, 1962 (age 64); Port Arthur, Ontario

Curling career
- Member Association: Northern Ontario (1984–1985); Ontario (1989–2013)
- Brier: 4 (1985, 1990, 1998, 2001)
- World Championship: 3 (1985, 1990, 1998)
Medal record
Men's curling
Representing Canada
World Curling Championships
| Gold medal – first place | 1985 Glasgow |
| Gold medal – first place | 1990 Västerås |
| Gold medal – first place | 1998 Kamloops |
Representing Ontario
Montana's Brier
| Gold medal – first place | 1985 Moncton |
| Gold medal – first place | 1990 Sault Ste. Marie |
| Gold medal – first place | 1998 Winnipeg |
| Bronze medal – third place | 2001 Ottawa |

Ian J. Tetley (born August 14, 1962) is a Canadian curler from Oakville, Ontario. He is a three-time Brier and World Champion.

== Career ==
Tetley is originally from Thunder Bay, in Northern Ontario, which gets a separate team at the Brier. In 1985, he played second for Al Hackner, for which they won he won his first Brier, and World Championships, that same season. Tetley later moved to southern Ontario to play for second Ed Werenich. In 1990, Tetley won his second Brier, this time representing (southern) Ontario with Werenich. That team also won the World Championships. In 1994, he joined Wayne Middaugh's new rink, to play as his second. They won the Brier in 1998, and later Tetley picked up his third World Championship. The team made it to the Brier again in 2001, placing third. It would be Tetley's only Brier run that did not result in a world championship. In, 2003 he left the team. After playing for Mike Harris for one season, he was brought back to play for Middaugh before leaving for good in 2008 to play second for Peter Corner. Tetley was named to Canadian Curling Hall of Fame in 1999.

== Personal life ==
Ian's father Bill is also a former Brier champion (1975). Growing up Tetley was also a top junior skier. He is married to seven-time U.S. Champion Erika Brown. He has three children. Originally from Thunder Bay, Tetley moved to Toronto after graduating from Lakehead University.
