= Paul Savage (curler) =

Canadian curler (born 1947)

- Curler
- Born: June 25, 1947 (age 79); Toronto, Ontario

Curling career
- Member Association: Ontario
- Brier: 7 (1970, 1973, 1974, 1977, 1983, 1984, 1988)
- World Championship: 1 (1983)
- Olympic: 1 (1998)
Medal record
Men's Curling
Representing Canada
Olympic Games
Silver medal – second place	1998 Nagano	Team
World Championships
Gold medal – first place	1983 Regina	Team
Representing Ontario
Labatt Brier
Gold medal – first place	1983 Sudbury
Silver medal – second place	1973 Edmonton
Silver medal – second place	1977 Montreal
Silver medal – second place	1984 Victoria
Bronze medal – third place	1974 London
Bronze medal – third place	1988 Chicoutimi

A. Paul "The Round Mound of Come Around" Savage (born June 25, 1947, in Toronto, Ontario) is a Canadian curler, world champion and Olympic medallist.

== Career ==
In 1983 he played third for Ed Werenich's team when they won the Labatt Brier and then won the 1983 World Men's Championship as Team Canada. He received a silver medal at the 1998 Winter Olympics in Nagano with the Mike Harris rink, where he was their alternate. He is considered to be one of the best left-handers to play the game.

Savage made seven appearances at the Brier, the Canadian men's national championship, between 1970 and 1988, five times as skip of the Ontario rink and twice as third. He was named to the Canadian Curling Hall of Fame in 1988.

In 2009, Savage and the rest of his 1983 world champion team, which included Werenich, John Kawaja and Neil Harrison were inducted into the Ontario Sports Hall of Fame.

== Personal life ==
He lives in Markham, Ontario.

Savage has a tattoo showing a curling stone nested inside the Canadian flag, which he got before the 1998 Nagano Olympics. In 2002 he made a cameo appearance in the curling comedy Men With Brooms, playing a television announcer.
