= John Kawaja =

Canadian curler (born 1961)

- Curler
- Born: April 27, 1961 (age 65); Chandler, Quebec

Curling career
- Member Association: Ontario
- Brier: 6 (1983, 1984, 1988, 1990, 1995, 1997)
- World Championship: 2 (1983, 1990)
Medal record
Men's curling
Representing Canada
World Curling Championships
Gold medal – first place	1983 Regina
Gold medal – first place	1990 Västerås
Representing Ontario
Labatt Brier
Gold medal – first place	1983 Sudbury
Gold medal – first place	1990 Sault Ste. Marie
Silver medal – second place	1984 Victoria
Bronze medal – third place	1988 Chicoutimi
Canadian Olympic Curling Trials
Bronze medal – third place	1987 Calgary
Bronze medal – third place	1997 Brandon

John W. Kawaja is a Canadian curler. He is a two-time Brier and World Champion.

== Career ==
Kawaja, nicknamed the "Lebanese Lion", moved to Ontario as a youth, and became a high-profile skip (he won the 1980 Ontario junior championship), but it was not until his move to the Ed Werenich rink that he finally started to win championships. In 1983, while attending York University as a political science student, Kawaja won his first provincial championship, playing second for Werenich. The team not only won the provincial championship, but they won the Brier and the World Curling Championship as well that year. Kawaja is the youngest player to have ever won the Brier (21 years old). In 1984, the team repeated their provincial championship, but lost in the Brier final to Michael Riley's Manitoba rink. Kawaja was promoted to the third position for Werenich, and in 1990 won his third provincial title. The team followed up with another Brier and World Championship. Kawaja won two more provincial titles with Werenich in 1995 and 1997. He and Ed Werenich formed the nucleus of teams that won more money than any curling team in the 1980s and 90s.

Kawaja was named to the Canadian Curling Hall of Fame in 1991. In 2009, Kawaja and his 1983 world champion team (Werenich, Paul Savage and John Kawaja) were inducted into the Ontario Sports Hall of Fame.

Kawaja retired from curling in 1997. After working with Bata Shoes to work on a curling shoe design, he moved on to work with Adidas after retiring from curling. He later became president of the Taylormade golf company. He resides in Encinitas, California.
