= Richard Hart (curler) =

Canadian curler and Olympic medalist

- Curler
- Born: October 14, 1968 (age 58); Toronto, Ontario, Canada

Team
- Curling club: St. George's G&CC; Etobicoke, Toronto, ON

Curling career
- Member Association: Ontario
- Brier: 9 (1995, 2006, 2007, 2008, 2009, 2010, 2011, 2016, 2017)
- World Championship: 1 (2007)
- Top CTRS ranking: 1st (2008–09)
- Grand Slam victories: 8: World Cup/Masters (Dec 2006, Jan 2008, Nov 2008, 2009); The National (2002, Jan 2004); Players (2008); Canadian Open (2009)
Medal record
Winter Olympics
Silver medal – second place	1998 Nagano
World Curling Championships
Gold medal – first place	2007 Edmonton
Canadian Olympic Curling Trials
Gold medal – first place	1997 Brandon
Silver medal – second place	2009 Edmonton
Tim Hortons Brier
Gold medal – first place	2007 Hamilton
Silver medal – second place	2006 Regina
Silver medal – second place	2008 Winnipeg
Silver medal – second place	2010 Halifax
Silver medal – second place	2011 London
Bronze medal – third place	2009 Calgary

Richard Hart (born October 14, 1968) is a Canadian curler from Pickering, Ontario. He is a Brier and world champion, as well as an Olympic silver medallist.

He currently coaches the Mike McEwen rink.

== Career ==
Hart attended his first Brier in 1995 as an alternate for Ed Werenich. It was his only major tournament experience before winning the 1997 Canadian Olympic trials as the third for the Mike Harris team. At the 1998 Winter Olympics, the team won a silver medal. He left the team in 2000, and joined up with Glenn Howard. Eventually with Howard, Hart would go to another Brier, in 2006 where they lost in the final. The following year, they won the 2007 Tim Hortons Brier and then the 2007 Ford World Men's Curling Championship. As vice with Glenn Howard he placed 2nd in the Olympic trials in Edmonton in 2009 and is a runner up for the past 3 Briers. He is nicknamed "the Hart Surgeon" for his ability to make difficult shots under pressure. He was the 2011 winner of the annual Ford Hot Shots skills and shot-making competition that precedes the start of play at the Brier.

After the 2010-11 curling season, Hart announced that he was going to retire from high-performance curling. He leaves the world of curling after spending his career playing as third under Mike Harris for ten years and under Glenn Howard for eleven years.

For the 2014-15 curling season, Hart announced that he was going to return from his retirement and continue to curl for the Glenn Howard rink.

== Personal life ==
Hart works as a Principal for Hart-Well Electrical Company Limited. His work and job influenced his decision to leave competitive curling the first time he retired. Hart is married and has three children, including Joseph (Joey), the alternate on his 2016 Brier team.

== Teams ==
Season	Skip	Third	Second	Lead
1992–93	Mike Harris	Richard Hart	Collin Mitchell	George Karrys
1994–95	Mike Harris	Richard Hart	George Karrys	
1996–97	Mike Harris	Richard Hart	Collin Mitchell	George Karrys
1998–99	Mike Harris	Richard Hart	Collin Mitchell	George Karrys
1999–00	Mike Harris	Richard Hart	Collin Mitchell	George Karrys
2000–01	Glenn Howard	Richard Hart	Collin Mitchell	Jason Mitchell
2001–02	Glenn Howard	Richard Hart	Collin Mitchell	Jason Mitchell
2002–03	Glenn Howard	Richard Hart	Collin Mitchell	Jason Mitchell
2003–04	Glenn Howard	Richard Hart	Collin Mitchell	Jason Mitchell
2004–05	Glenn Howard	Richard Hart	Brent Laing	Craig Savill
2005–06	Glenn Howard	Richard Hart	Brent Laing	Craig Savill
2006–07	Glenn Howard	Richard Hart	Brent Laing	Craig Savill
2007–08	Glenn Howard	Richard Hart	Brent Laing	Craig Savill
2008–09	Glenn Howard	Richard Hart	Brent Laing	Craig Savill
2009–10	Glenn Howard	Richard Hart	Brent Laing	Craig Savill
2010–11	Glenn Howard	Richard Hart	Brent Laing	Craig Savill
2014–15	Glenn Howard	Richard Hart	Jon Mead	Craig Savill
2015–16	Glenn Howard	Wayne Middaugh (Note: Wayne Middaugh was injured and unable to play in the 2016 Ontario Provincial Championships and Brier. He was replaced by Adam Spencer at second, moving Hart up to third.)	Richard Hart	Scott Howard
2016–17	Glenn Howard	Richard Hart	David Mathers	Scott Howard
