= Mike Harris (curler) =

Canadian curler (born 1967)

- Curler
- Born: June 9, 1967 (age 59); Georgetown, Ontario, Canada

Team
- Curling club: Brant CC, Brantford, ON
- Skip: Mike Harris
- Third: Scott Foster
- Second: Chad Allen
- Lead: Jay Allen
- Alternate: Richard Hart

Curling career
- Member Association: Ontario
- Brier: 1 (2004)
- Olympic: 1 (1998)
Medal record
Men's curling
Representing Canada
Olympic Games
Silver medal – second place	1998 Nagano	Team
Canadian Olympic Curling Trials
Gold medal – first place	1997 Brandon

Michael R. Harris (born June 9, 1967 in Georgetown, Ontario) is a Canadian curler and commentator. Harris led his team to win the silver medal at the 1998 Winter Olympics.

== Curling career ==
Relatively unknown due to the shadows cast out of Ontario in the form of superstars Russ Howard, Ed Werenich and Wayne Middaugh, and having not qualified to a Brier out of Ontario yet, Harris rose to stardom when he skipped his team of Richard Hart, Collin Mitchell and George Karrys to a win at the Canadian Olympic trials in 1997, qualifying the team for the 1998 Winter Olympics. They would defeat the favoured Kevin Martin 6-5 in the trials final, after a 7-2 round robin record had the team sole 1st and a direct bye to the final.

At the Olympics, Harris' team dominated throughout, while other pre-Olympic favourites such as reigning World Champions Sweden (skipped by Peja Lindholm) and reigning World silver medallist and European Champions Germany (skipped by Andy Kapp) struggled and were never in playoff contention. Harris lost only one game in the round-robin (his final game to three-time World Champion and 1988 Olympic Gold medallist Eigil Ramsfjell, skipping Norway). They would win their semi final over the U.S team skipped by Tim Somerville 7-1, in a game conceded after 8 ends, before losing in a major upset in the gold medal final against the surprise finalists, Team Switzerland skipped by Patrick Hürlimann, who they had easily beaten 8-3 in the round robin. Harris was ill during the final game, which many attribute to why they had lost. He shot at only 25% in the final, and even had to take several short breaks on the sideline throughout due to lack of physical energy. However, he was not the only one to struggle in the gold medal game, third Richard Hart shot only 58% and second Collin Mitchell an uncharacteristic 73% (though lead George Karrys was stellar at 98%).

Prior to the Olympics, Harris' only claim to fame on the national curling scene had been a 6-5 record at the 1986 Canadian Junior Men's Curling Championship and a 4-7 record at the 1989 Canadian Mixed Curling Championship. After the 1998 Olympics, Harris skipped a team to the 2004 Nokia Brier where they finished 6-5.

Harris continued to curl competitively into the 2010s. He became curling commentator for the CBC and Rogers Sportsnet and worked as a golf professional.

Harris currently coaches the John Epping rink.

== Personal life ==
Harris currently lives in Toronto. He is married and has three children. He was employed as the executive director of the Northern Ontario Curling Association, in addition to his commentary work on Rogers Sportsnet.

Preceded by Don Duguid	CBC Sports Lead Curling analyst (with Joan McCusker); 2001-2026	Succeeded by Present
