= Ed Werenich =

Canadian curler (born 1947)

Edward Werenich
- Curler
- Born: June 23, 1947 (age 79); Benito, Manitoba, Canada

Curling career
- Member Association: Ontario
- Brier: 10 (1973, 1974, 1977, 1981, 1983, 1984, 1988, 1990, 1995, 1997)
- World Championship: 2 (1983, 1990)
Medal record
Representing Canada
World Curling Championships
Gold medal – first place	1983 Regina
Gold medal – first place	1990 Västerås
Representing Ontario
Labatt Brier
Gold medal – first place	1983 Sudbury
Gold medal – first place	1990 Sault Ste. Marie
Silver medal – second place	1973 Edmonton
Silver medal – second place	1977 Montréal
Silver medal – second place	1984 Victoria
Bronze medal – third place	1988 Chicoutimi
Canadian Olympic Curling Trials
Bronze medal – third place	1987 Calgary
Bronze medal – third place	1997 Brandon

Edward Werenich (born June 23, 1947) is a Canadian curler from Holland Landing, Ontario. Nicknamed "the Wrench," Werenich has been known to be a colourful and outspoken character. Outside of curling, Werenich worked as a firefighter.

== Career ==
Werenich was born and raised in the town of Benito, Manitoba but moved to Toronto after finishing high school. He began curling at age ten.

In 1972, Werenich joined Paul Savage's team as his second. The following year they would play in their first Brier. They would return again in 1974 and then in 1977 with Werenich as Savage's third. Without a championship, Werenich skipped his own team to the Brier in 1981, but still could not win.

In 1983 Savage joined Werenich as his third and they would go on to win the Brier title that year over Ed Lukowich of Alberta. At the World Curling Championships of that year, Werenich defeated Keith Wendorf's team from Germany in the final. Werenich returned to the Brier in 1984 and again in 1988 before winning for the last time in 1990 this time without Savage- defeating Jim Sullivan's New Brunswick team.

During the 1987 Canadian Olympic Curling Trials, Werenich was "humiliated" by the Canadian Curling Association threatening to disqualify him if he didn't "shed a few pounds"

At the 1990 World Championships, Werenich defeated Scotland, skipped by David Smith. Werenich returned to the Brier in 1995 and then in 1997 before announcing his first retirement from curling in 2000. Werenich came out of retirement in 2004, and made it to the Ontario men's championship for one final time.

Werenich was named to the Canadian Curling Hall of Fame in 1988. The other three members of his 1983 world championship rink, Paul Savage, John Kawaja and Neil Harrison are also in the Hall of Fame.

In 2009, Werenich, Savage, Kawaja and Harrison were inducted into the Ontario Sports Hall of Fame.
