= 2004 The National =

Grand Slam of Curling event

- Host city: Prince Albert, Saskatchewan
- Arena: Prince Albert Communiplex
- Dates: January 22–25, 2004
- Winner: (Ontario) Team Howard
- Curling club: Coldwater & District CC, Coldwater
- Skip: Glenn Howard
- Third: Richard Hart
- Second: Collin Mitchell
- Lead: Jason Mitchell
- Finalist: (Manitoba) Jeff Stoughton

2004 The National, the third annual edition of The National Grand Slam curling event was held January 22–25, 2004 at the Prince Albert Communiplex in Prince Albert, Saskatchewan. The total purse of the event was $100,000. It was the third of four (men's) PharmAssist Grand Slam events of the 2003-04 curling season.

Glenn Howard, and his rink of Richard Hart, Collin Mitchell and Jason Mitchell from Coldwater, Ontario, won the event, defeating Jeff Stoughton from Winnipeg 5–3. With the win, Team Howard took home $30,000, while Stoughton won $18,000. Howard stole deuces in the first and fifth ends en route to the victory. Team Stoughton had been undefeated at the event up to that point, including defeating Howard 7–2 in the A final. Going into the event, Howard's foursome was ranked 10th on the World Curling Tour money standings, and Stoughton was ranked second. The number 1 ranked Wayne Middaugh rink lost in the third place game to Kerry Burtnyk.

Five of the top 13 teams (Kevin Martin, John Morris, Jamie King, Randy Ferbey and Jamie Koe) on the Tour opted to not play in the event, as it conflicted with the playdowns for the Alberta men's championships.

The event featured a special rule called the "Howard Rule", in which the first four rocks of each end could not be removed, even if they were in the rings.

== Teams ==
The teams were as follows:

Skip	Third	Second	Lead	Locale
Greg Balsdon	Adam Spencer	Don Bowser	Robert Dickson	(Ontario) Toronto
Dave Boehmer	Pat Spring	Richard Daneault	Don Harvey	Petersfield, Manitoba
Kerry Burtnyk	Ken Tresoor	Rob Fowler	Keith Fenton	(Manitoba) Winnipeg
Glen Despins	Rod Montgomery	Phillip Germain	Dwayne Mihalicz	(Saskatchewan) Regina
Brad Heidt	Arnie Geisler	Mike Jantzen	Steve Laycock	Kerrobert, Saskatchewan
Guy Hemmings	Martin Ferland	Dale Ness	Pierre Charette	Saint-Aimé, Quebec
Glenn Howard	Richard Hart	Collin Mitchell	Jason Mitchell	Coldwater, Ontario
Wes Johnson	Leon Romaniuk	Greg Romaniuk	Tom Violette	(United States) Seattle
Bruce Korte	Client Dieno	Roger Korte	Rory Golanowski	(Saskatchewan) Saskatoon
Lee Dong-keun	Park Jae-cheol	Ko Seung-wan	Choi Min-suk	Gyeongbuk, South Korea
Heath McCormick	Brent Laing	Craig Savill	Shaun Harris	Sarnia, Ontario
Wayne Middaugh	Graeme McCarrel	Joe Frans	Scott Bailey	Midland, Ontario
Kevin Park	Shane Park	Scott Park	Kerry Park	(Alberta) Edmonton
Vic Peters	Ryan Fry	Chris Neufeld	Denni Neufeld	(Manitoba) Winnipeg
Bryan Derbowka	Gerald Shymko (skip)	Gord Hardy	Steve Sobkow	Calder, Saskatchewan
Jeff Stoughton	Jon Mead	Garry Vandenberghe	Steve Gould	(Manitoba) Winnipeg

== Draw ==
The event was a triple knock out.

=== Playoffs ===
The playoff scores were as follows:

Quarterfinals
(Manitoba) Kerry Burtnyk	7
(Quebec) Guy Hemmings	1
(Ontario) Glenn Howard	10
(Saskatchewan) Brad Heidt	6
(Manitoba) Jeff Stoughton	5
(Alberta) Kevin Park	4
(Ontario) Wayne Middaugh	7
(Manitoba) Vic Peters	4

Semifinals
(Manitoba) Kerry Burtnyk	4
(Ontario) Glenn Howard	8
(Manitoba) Jeff Stoughton	7
(Ontario) Wayne Middaugh	4

Final
(Ontario) Glenn Howard	5
(Manitoba) Jeff Stoughton	3
Third place
(Manitoba) Kerry Burtnyk	6
(Ontario) Wayne Middaugh	3
