= 2003 Masters of Curling (January) =

Grand Slam of Curling event

2003 M&M Meat Shops Masters of Curling
- Host city: Sudbury, Ontario
- Dates: January 9 – 12
- Winner: (Alberta) Kevin Martin
- Skip: Kevin Martin
- Third: Don Walchuk
- Second: Carter Rycroft
- Lead: Don Bartlett
- Finalist: (Manitoba) Vic Peters

The 2003 M&M Meat Shops Masters of Curling was held from January 9 to 12, 2003 in Sudbury, Ontario. The event was one of the four men's Grand Slams of the 2002–03 curling season.

The total purse for the event was $100,000, with $25,000 going to the winning team. The format was a triple knockout.

Edmonton, Alberta's Kevin Martin rink defeated Vic Peters of Winnipeg, Manitoba in the final, 8–7. Peters played in the event with a broken foot. It was Martin's seventh straight event win on the World Curling Tour, and his second slam title of the season.

The semifinals and finals were shown on Sportsnet. The event was held on the same weekend as the 2003 Canada Cup of Curling, another major Canadian curling tournament. The Canada Cup, which was televised on CBC won the ratings battle with 350,000 viewers for the women's final on the Saturday and 435,000 for the men's final on Sunday, while 145,000 viewed the Masters semi (same time slot as the Canada Cup men's final) and 288,000 viewed the Masters final on Sunday night.

== Teams ==
The teams were as follows:

| Skip | Third | Second | Lead | Locale |
|---|---|---|---|---|
| Kerry Burtnyk | Jeff Ryan | Rob Fowler | Keith Fenton | Winnipeg, Manitoba |
| Martin Ferland | Pierre Charette (skip) | Michel Ferland | Marco Berthelot | Buckingham, Quebec |
| Glen Despins | Rod Montgomery | Phillip Germain | Dwayne Mihalicz | Strongfield, Saskatchewan |
| Dale Duguid (Note: Team as of Oct 2002) | Brad Hannah (?) | Ryan Fry (?) | Kyle Werenich (?) | Winnipeg, Manitoba |
| Glenn Howard | Richard Hart | Collin Mitchell | Jason Mitchell | Coldwater, Ontario |
| Bruce Korte | Art Paulsen | Roger Korte | Rory Golanowski | Saskatoon, Saskatchewan |
| Allan Lyburn | Mark Taylor | Mike Horn | Ross Granger | Brandon, Manitoba |
| William Lyburn | Brent Braemer | Dean Klippenstine | Mark Kennedy | Brandon, Manitoba |
| Kevin Martin | Don Walchuk | Carter Rycroft | Don Bartlett | Edmonton, Alberta |
| Greg McAulay | Grant Dezura | Mike Bradley | Jody Sveistrup | Richmond, British Columbia |
| Wayne Middaugh | Graeme McCarrel | Ian Tetley | Scott Bailey | Midland, Ontario |
| Kevin Park | Shane Park | Scott Park | Kerry Park | Edmonton, Alberta |
| Vic Peters | Mark Olson | Chris Neufeld | Steve Gould | Winnipeg, Manitoba |
| Brent Pierce | Bryan Miki | Dean Koyanagi | Ross Graham | New Westminster, British Columbia |
| Peter Steski | Chad McMullan | Jeff Steski | Andy Ormsby | Toronto, Ontario |
| Jeff Stoughton | Jon Mead | Garry Vandenberghe | Jim Spencer | Winnipeg, Manitoba |

== Playoffs ==
Quarterfinals
(Alberta) Kevin Martin | 6
(Quebec) Pierre Charette | 4
(Ontario) Wayne Middaugh | 8
(Manitoba) Kerry Burtnyk | 7
(Ontario) Glenn Howard | 10
(Saskatchewan) Glen Despins | 9
(Manitoba) Vic Peters | 8
(Manitoba) Allan Lyburn | 3

Semifinals
(Alberta) Kevin Martin | 8
(Ontario) Wayne Middaugh | 2
(Ontario) Glenn Howard | 4
(Manitoba) Vic Peters | 8

Finals
(Alberta) Kevin Martin | 8
(Manitoba) Vic Peters | 7
