= Martin Ferland =

Canadian curler

- Curler
- Born: November 8, 1970 (age 56); Drummondville, Quebec

Team
- Curling club: CC Grand-Mère, Grand-Mère, QC

Curling career
- Brier: 2 (2001, 2007)
- Top CTRS ranking: 14th (2005–06, 2006–07)
- Grand Slam victories: 1 (2003 National)

Martin Ferland (born November 8, 1970) is a Canadian curler from Trois-Rivières, Quebec.

== Career ==
Born in Drummondville, Quebec, Ferland was a member of the 2007 Quebec champion team, that was skipped by Pierre Charette. Ferland threw last stones for the team. At that first Brier, Ferland's team finished with a 4-7 record.

Ferland was also the 1989 provincial junior champion skip. He skipped Quebec at the 1989 Canadian Junior Curling Championships, but lost to Dean Joanisse of British Columbia in the final.

Ferland has been one of the more visible Quebec based teams on the World Curling Tour (WCT). During the 2010s, he regularly competed in World Curling Tour events, while other Quebec rinks were less visible. Despite this, Ferland had regularly played second-fiddle to Jean-Michel Ménard when it came to Quebec Brier playdowns. Since winning the 2007 provincial championship with Charette, Ferland lost three straight provincial finals frin 2008 to 2010, the first two were against Ménard. Following his 2010 defeat, Ferland would not make the playoffs at a Quebec championship until the 2014 Quebec Men's Provincial Curling Championship, where he finished 4th.

Ferland has won a total of four WCT events, including one Grand Slam event, The National in 2003. It remains the only Grand Slam victory for a Quebec-based team.

== Grand Slam record ==
Ferland has not competed in any Grand Slam events since the 2012–13 season.

Key
C	Champion
F	Lost in Final
SF	Lost in Semifinal
QF	Lost in Quarterfinals
R16	Lost in the round of 16
Q	Did not advance to playoffs
T2	Played in Tier 2 event
DNP	Did not participate in event
N/A	Not a Grand Slam event that season

Event	2002–03	2003–04	2004–05	2005–06	2006–07	2007–08	2008–09	2009–10	2010–11	2011–12	2012–13
Masters	QF	QF	Q	Q	Q	QF	DNP	DNP	DNP	DNP	Q
The National	C	Q	DNP	DNP	Q	DNP	QF	DNP	Q	DNP	DNP
Canadian Open	QF	Q	Q	QF	Q	SF	DNP	DNP	DNP	DNP	DNP
Players'	Q	DNP	DNP	SF	Q	Q	DNP	Q	DNP	DNP	DNP
