= 2006 Masters of Curling =

2006 Masters of Curling may refer to:

- 2006 Masters of Curling (February)
- 2006 Masters of Curling (December)
