= 2002 M&M Meat Shops National =

2002 The National
- Host city: Sault Ste. Marie, Ontario
- Arena: Sault Memorial Gardens; Soo Curlers Association
- Dates: January 31–February 3, 2002
- Winner: (Ontario) Team Howard
- Curling club: Coldwater & District CC, Coldwater, Ontario
- Skip: Glenn Howard
- Fourth: Richard Hart
- Second: Collin Mitchell
- Lead: Jason Mitchell
- Finalist: (British Columbia) Greg McAulay

The 2002 M&M Meat Shops National, the first annual edition of The National Grand Slam curling event was held January 31 to February 3, 2002 at the Sault Memorial Gardens and the Soo Curlers Association in Sault Ste. Marie, Ontario. The total purse of the event was $100,000. It was the third of four (men's) inaugural Grand Slam events of the 2001-02 curling season.

The semifinals and finals were televised on CTV Sportsnet.

In the final, Coldwater, Ontario's Glenn Howard rink won their first Slam title, defeating 2000 World Champion Greg McAulay and his rink of Brent Pierce, Bryan Miki and Jody Sveistrup from Richmond, British Columbia. With the win, the Howard foursome, which also included Richard Hart, Collin Mitchell and Jason Mitchell took home $30,000, while Team McCaulay won $18,000. McCaulay blamed his loss on not having draw weight. In the second end, he was heavy with his final draw, which resulted in a steal of one for Howard, going down 3–0 early. Another miss by McAulay in the sixth (an attempted hit which resulted in a tick), led to an open draw for two for Howard, to go up 6–3. A three-ender in the eighth all but ensured a victory for the Howard rink, which would go on to a 9–7 victory. The attendance for the final was 2,435.

== Format ==
The event was a 24-team triple-knockout competition.

== Knockout brackets ==
=== A Event ===
Scores:

A	Qualifier 1
(Saskatchewan) Bruce Korte	11
(Ontario) Ed Premo	4
(Saskatchewan) Bruce Korte	5
(Alberta) Kevin Park	8
(Alberta) Kevin Park	8
(Manitoba) William Lyburn	5
(Alberta) Kevin Park	7
(British Columbia) Greg McAulay	2
(British Columbia) Greg McAulay	8
(United States) Tim Somerville	6
(British Columbia) Greg McAulay	5
(Scotland) Tom Brewster	2
(Saskatchewan) Glen Despins	2
(Scotland) Tom Brewster	10

A
(Ontario) Wayne Middaugh	6
(Ontario) Rich Moffatt	10
(Manitoba) Allan Lyburn	5
(Quebec) Pierre Charette	10
(Ontario) Glenn Howard	8
(Norway) Pål Trulsen	7
(Ontario) Dan Lemieux	5
(British Columbia) Bert Gretzinger	8

Semifinals
(Ontario) Rich Moffatt	8
(Quebec) Pierre Charette	12
(Ontario) Glenn Howard	5
(British Columbia) Bert Gretzinger	1

Qualifier 2
(Quebec) Pierre Charette	4
(Ontario) Glenn Howard	8

A
(Manitoba) Jeff Stoughton	8
(Ontario) Al Harnden	2
(Manitoba) Dave Boehmer	9
(Alberta) Warren Hassall	6
(Manitoba) Kerry Burtnyk	9
(Scotland) David Mundell	4
(Manitoba) Vic Peters	10
(Ontario) Todd Malpass	1

Semifinals
(Manitoba) Jeff Stoughton	4
(Manitoba) Dave Boehmer	2
(Manitoba) Kerry Burtnyk	5
(Manitoba) Vic Peters	7

Qialifier 3
(Manitoba) Jeff Stoughton	1
(Manitoba) Vic Peters	7

=== B Event ===
Scores:

B	Qualifier 4
(Ontario) Ed Premo	6
(Manitoba) William Lyburn	9
(Manitoba) Dave Boehmer	4
(Manitoba) William Lyburn	5
(Manitoba) William Lyburn	7
(Manitoba) Kerry Burtnyk	3
(Manitoba) Kerry Burtnyk	8
(United States) Tim Somerville	5
(United States) Tim Somerville	4
(Saskatchewan) Glen Despins	2
(Manitoba) Kerry Burtnyk	4
(Quebec) Pierre Charette	9

B	Qualifier 5
(Ontario) Wayne Middaugh	6
(Manitoba) Allan Lyburn	5
(Saskatchewan) Bruce Korte	8
(Ontario) Wayne Middaugh	9
(Ontario) Wayne Middaugh	5
(Norway) Pål Trulsen	4
(Scotland) Tom Brewster	8
(Norway) Pål Trulsen	9
(Norway) Pål Trulsen	7
(Ontario) Dan Lemieux	3
(Ontario) Wayne Middaugh	5
(Manitoba) Jeff Stoughton	8

B	Qualifier 6
(Ontario) Al Harnden	6
(Alberta) Warren Hassall	7
(Ontario) Rich Moffatt	8
(Alberta) Warren Hassall	2
(Ontario) Rich Moffatt	8
(Scotland) David Mundell	3
(British Columbia) Bert Gretzinger	5
(Scotland) David Mundell	10
(Scotland) David Mundell	8
(Ontario) Todd Malpass	5
(Ontario) Rich Moffatt	5
(British Columbia) Greg McAulay	8

=== C Event ===
Scores:

C	Qualifier 7
(Manitoba) Dave Boehmer	10
(United States) Tim Somerville	7
(Manitoba) Dave Boehmer	7
(Scotland) David Mundell	8
(Ontario) Ed Premo	7
(Scotland) Tom Brewster	4
(Ontario) Ed Premo	5
(Scotland) David Mundell	6
(Scotland) David Mundell	8
(Ontario) Wayne Middaugh	3
(Manitoba) William Lyburn	6
(British Columbia) Bert Gretzinger	8
(Ontario) Allan Lyburn	3
(British Columbia) Bert Gretzinger	8
(British Columbia) Bert Gretzinger	4
(Ontario) Wayne Middaugh	6

C	Qualifier 8
(Ontario) Rich Moffatt	9
(Saskatchewan) Bruce Korte	4
(Saskatchewan) Glen Despins	9
(Saskatchewan) Bruce Korte	11
(Saskatchewan) Bruce Korte	9
(Norway) Pål Trulsen	2
(Ontario) Rich Moffatt	4
(Manitoba) Kerry Burtnyk	9
(Manitoba) Kerry Burtnyk	8
(Ontario) Al Harnden	6
(Alberta) Warren Hassall	10
(Ontario) Todd Malpass	0
(Alberta) Warren Hassall	5
(Ontario) Al Harnden	8
(Ontario) Al Harnden	7
(Ontario) Dan Lemieux	5

== Playoffs ==
The playoff bracket was as follows:

Quarterfinals
(Manitoba) Jeff Stoughton	6
(Scotland) David Mundell	7
(Manitoba) Vic Peters	4
(Ontario) Glenn Howard	6
(Manitoba) Kerry Burtnyk	9
(Alberta) Kevin Park	4
(Quebec) Pierre Charette	7
(British Columbia) Greg McAulay	8

Semifinals
(Scotland) David Mundell	1
(Ontario) Glenn Howard	7
(Manitoba) Kerry Burtnyk	5
(British Columbia) Greg McAulay	8

Final
(Ontario) Glenn Howard	9
(British Columbia) Greg McAulay	7

=== Final ===
Team	1	2	3	4	5	6	7	8	9	10	Final
(Ontario) Glenn Howard	2	1	0	1	0	2	0	3	0	X	9
(British Columbia) Greg McAulay	0	0	1	0	2	0	2	0	2	X	7
