= Rob Fowler (curler) =

Canadian curler

- Curler
- Born: June 25, 1975 (age 51); Brandon, Manitoba

Team
- Curling club: Charleswood CC, Winnipeg, MB

Curling career
- Brier: 4 (2007, 2009, 2010, 2012)
- Top CTRS ranking: 5th (2006-07, 2009-10)
- Grand Slam victories: 0
Medal record
Men's Curling
Representing Manitoba
Canadian Olympic Curling Trials
Bronze medal – third place	2009 Edmonton
Tim Hortons Brier
Silver medal – second place	2009 Calgary
Bronze medal – third place	2007 Hamilton
Bronze medal – third place	2012 Saskatoon

Robert Fowler (born June 25, 1975 in Brandon, Manitoba) is a Canadian curler.

== Career ==
Fowler was a member of the Jeff Stoughton rink from 2006 to 2010. He was a member of the team at the 2009 Tim Hortons Brier which lost in the final to Kevin Martin. Prior to playing with Stoughton, Fowler played for such skips as Allan Lyburn, Kerry Burtnyk and Brent Scales.

Fowler has played in four Briers. In addition to the 2009 Brier, he also played in the 2007 Tim Hortons Brier, 2010 Tim Hortons Brier and 2012 Tim Hortons Brier.

As a skip, he led his team into the 2012 Safeway Championship as the tenth ranked team in the World Curling Tour. Riding on this win Fowler and the team went on to upset first Stoughton and then the number one ranked Mike McEwen in the final game to win his first provincial championship as a skip. At the Brier he went 8-3 in the round robin to finish in the 1 vs 2 game and became just the second Manitoban team from outside Winnipeg to qualify for the Brier playoffs. At his first Brier as a skip, Fowler's rink won the bronze medal, defeating the Northwest Territories/Yukon, skipped by Jamie Koe in an extra end.

== Personal ==
Fowler owns his own Hyundai dealership. His mother is former Manitoba champion Lois Fowler and his father is also a former provincial champion Brian Fowler.

== Grand slam record ==
Key
C	Champion
F	Lost in Final
SF	Lost in Semifinal
QF	Lost in Quarterfinals
R16	Lost in the round of 16
Q	Did not advance to playoffs
T2	Played in Tier 2 event
DNP	Did not participate in event
N/A	Not a Grand Slam event that season

Event	2002–03	2003–04	2004–05	2005–06	2006–07	2007–08	2008–09	2009–10	2010–11	2011-12	2012-13	2013-14
Masters	QF	QF	QF	DNP	Q	Q	SF	DNP	SF	Q	Q	DNP
Canadian Open	QF	SF	QF	DNP	QF	QF	SF	QF	QF	QF	Q	Q
The National	Q	SF	QF	DNP	DNP	SF	QF	QF	DNP	Q	QF	DNP
Players' Championships	Q	Q	DNP	DNP	Q	Q	QF	SF	QF	DNP	DNP	DNP
