= 2003 National =

2003 The National
- Host city: Humboldt, Saskatchewan
- Arena: Humboldt Uniplex
- Dates: January 30–February 2, 2003
- Winner: (Quebec) Team Charette
- Curling club: Buckingham CC, Buckingham, Quebec
- Skip: Pierre Charette
- Fourth: Martin Ferland
- Second: Michel Ferland
- Lead: Marco Berthelot
- Finalist: (Ontario) Glenn Howard

The 2003 National, the second annual edition of The National Grand Slam curling event was held January 30 to February 2, 2003 at the Humboldt Uniplex in Humboldt, Saskatchewan. The total purse of the event was $100,000. It was the third of four (men's) Pharmassist Grand Slam events of the 2002-03 curling season.

The final featured Quebec's Pierre Charette rink against Team Glenn Howard from Ontario. The main turning point in the game came in the second end, when Howard jammed his last rock, giving up a steal of one to go down 3–0. After Howard was forced to a single in the fourth, Charette's fourth stone thrower Martin Ferland drew for three in the fourth to take a massive 6–1 lead. Team Howard didn't give up though, and chipped away at Charette's lead, and trailed 8–6 after nine ends. In the last end, Charette won the game after Ferland drew to the four foot, to cut Howard down to a single point. Team Charette took home $25,000 with the win, while Howard's rink took home $15,000. The final was aired on television on Rogers Sportsnet. As of 2023, it is the only time a team from Quebec has won a men's Grand Slam event.

== Teams ==
The teams were as follows:

Skip	Third	Second	Lead	Locale
Dave Boehmer	Pat Spring	Kerry Kunka	Richard Daneault	Petersfield, Manitoba
Kerry Burtnyk	Jeff Ryan	Rob Fowler	Keith Fenton	(Manitoba) Winnipeg
Martin Ferland (fourth)	Pierre Charette (skip)	Michel Ferland	Marco Berthelot	Buckingham, Quebec
Glen Despins	Rod Montgomery	Phillip Germain	Dwayne Mihalicz	Regina, Saskatchewan
Dale Duguid				(Manitoba) Winnipeg
Bert Gretzinger	Rob Koffski	Mark Whittle	Dave Mellof	Kelowna, British Columbia
Glenn Howard	Richard Hart	Collin Mitchell	Jason Mitchell	Coldwater, Ontario
Bruce Korte	Art Paulsen	Roger Korte	Rory Golanowski	(Saskatchewan) Saskatoon
Allan Lyburn	Mark Taylor	Mike Horn	Ross Granger	Brandon, Manitoba
William Lyburn	Brent Braemer	Dean Klippenstine	Mark Kennedy	Brandon, Manitoba
Kevin Martin	Don Walchuk	Carter Rycroft	Don Bartlett	(Alberta) Edmonton
Greg McAulay	Grant Dezura	Mike Bradley	Jody Sveistrup	Richmond, British Columbia
Wayne Middaugh	Graeme McCarrel	Ian Tetley	Scott Bailey	Midland, Ontario
Kevin Park	Shane Park	Scott Park	Kerry Park	(Alberta) Edmonton
Vic Peters	Mark Olson	Chris Neufeld	Steve Gould	(Manitoba) Winnipeg
Brent Pierce	Bryan Miki	Dean Koyanagi	Ross Graham	New Westminster, British Columbia
Peter Steski	Chad McMullan	Jeff Steski	Andy Ormsby	(Ontario) Toronto
Bryan Derbowka	Gerald Shymko (skip)	Gord Hardy	Steve Sobkow	Calder, Saskatchewan
Jeff Stoughton	Jon Mead	Garry Vandenberghe	Jim Spencer	(Manitoba) Winnipeg

== Draw ==
The event was held as a triple knockout tournament.

== Playoffs ==
The playoff scores were as follows:

Quarterfinals
(Manitoba) Vic Peters	8
(Saskatchewan) Glen Despins	3
(Ontario) Glenn Howard	5
(Manitoba) Jeff Stoughton	4
(Alberta) Kevin Martin	7
(British Columbia) Brent Pierce	5
(Quebec) Pierre Charette	7
(British Columbia) Bert Gretzinger	5

Semifinals
(Manitoba) Vic Peters	4
(Ontario) Glenn Howard	7
(Alberta) Kevin Martin	5
(Quebec) Pierre Charette	7

Final
(Ontario) Glenn Howard	7
(Quebec) Pierre Charette	8

=== Final ===
Team	1	2	3	4	5	6	7	8	9	10	Final
(Ontario) Glenn Howard	0	0	1	0	2	0	1	0	2	1	7
(Quebec) Pierre Charette	2	1	0	3	0	1	0	1	0	0	8
