= Glenn Howard =

Canadian curler (born 1962)

- Curler
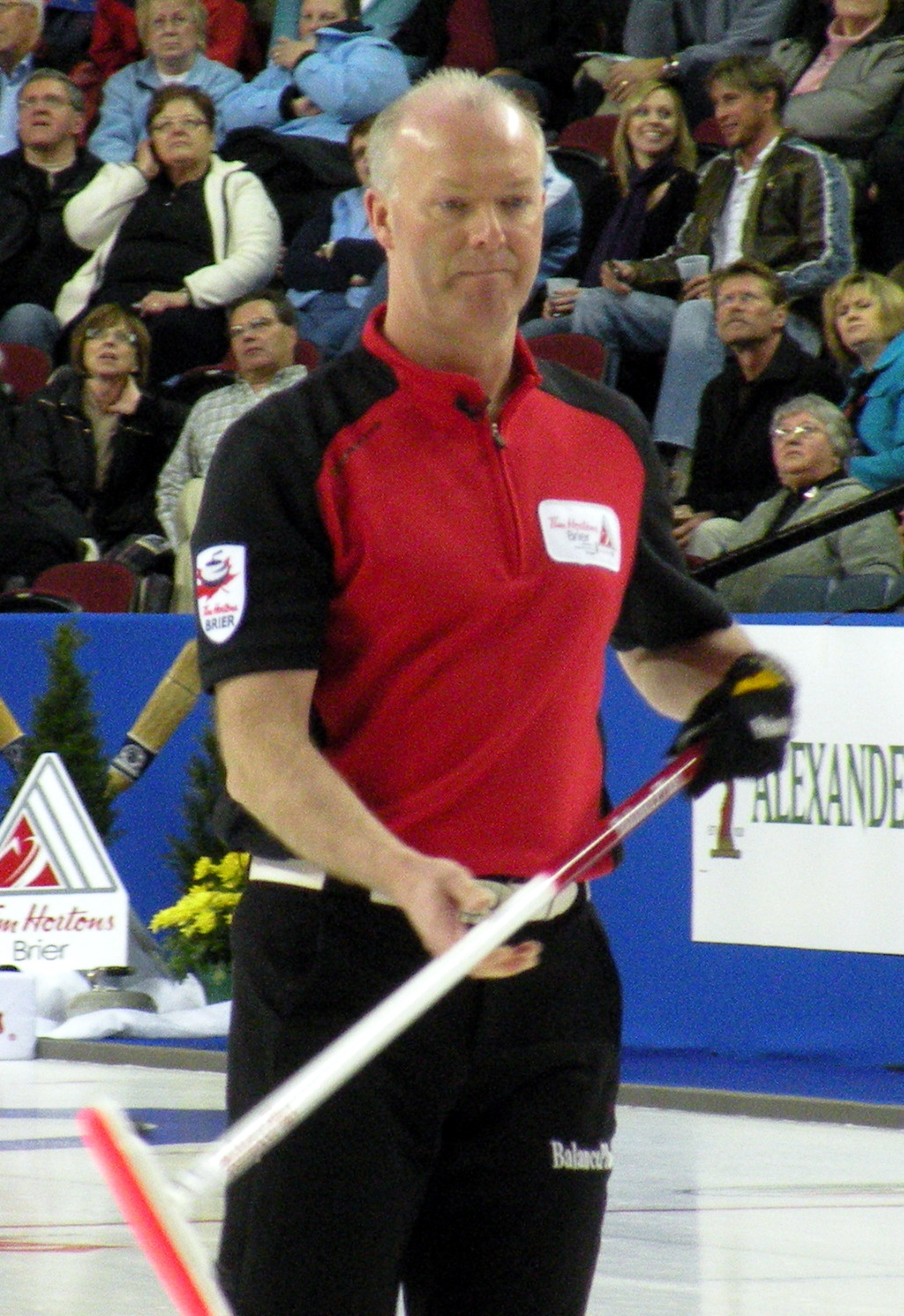
- Born: July 17, 1962 (age 64); Midland, Ontario, Canada

Curling career
- Member Association: Ontario
- Brier: 20 (1986, 1987, 1989, 1991, 1992, 1993, 1994, 2006, 2007, 2008, 2009, 2010, 2011, 2012, 2013, 2016, 2017, 2021, 2022, 2024)
- World Championship: 4 (1987, 1993, 2007, 2012)
- Top CTRS ranking: 1st (2008–09; 2011–12)
- Grand Slam victories: 14 (2002 National, 2004 National, 2006 Masters (Dec.), 2008 Masters (Jan.), 2008 Players', 2008 Masters (Nov.), 2009 Canadian Open, 2009 World Cup, 2011 World Cup, 2012 National, 2012 Canadian Open, 2013 Players', 2013 Masters, 2014 National)
Medal record
Men's curling
Representing Canada
World Championships
Gold medal – first place	1987 Vancouver
Gold medal – first place	1993 Geneva
Gold medal – first place	2007 Edmonton
Gold medal – first place	2012 Basel
Representing Ontario
Canadian Olympic Trials
Silver medal – second place	2009 Edmonton
Tim Hortons Brier
Gold medal – first place	1987 Edmonton
Gold medal – first place	1993 Ottawa
Gold medal – first place	2007 Hamilton
Gold medal – first place	2012 Saskatoon
Silver medal – second place	1986 Kitchener-Waterloo
Silver medal – second place	1992 Regina
Silver medal – second place	1994 Red Deer
Silver medal – second place	2006 Regina
Silver medal – second place	2008 Winnipeg
Silver medal – second place	2010 Halifax
Silver medal – second place	2011 London
Bronze medal – third place	1989 Saskatoon
Bronze medal – third place	2009 Calgary
Bronze medal – third place	2013 Edmonton

Glenn William Howard (born July 17, 1962) is a Canadian retired curler who is one of the most decorated curlers of all time. He has won four world championships, four Briers and 17 Ontario provincial championships, including a record eight straight, from 2006 to 2013. He has made 20 Brier appearances, playing in a total of 227 games, the third most of any curler. He has won a career 14 Grand Slams, won the 2001 TSN and 2013 Dominion All-Star Skin Games and the 2010 Canada Cup of Curling.

He currently coaches his son Scott Howard's Ontario rink.

== Career ==
=== Early career ===
Howard began curling at around the age of 10.

Howard lost two straight Ontario Junior Championship finals in 1980 and 1981, skipping a rink out of Midland, Ontario. In both events there were no playoffs, but a tie for first place after the round robin forced a tiebreaker. In 1980 he lost to John Kawaja and in 1981, he lost to John Base. In 1982, he finished third. Howard won the 1984 Ontario University Athletics Association title skipping the University of Waterloo curling team.

Howard played third for his older brother Russ for the first time at the 1983 Ontario Labatt Tankard provincial championship, representing the Bala Curling Club, due the club's small annual dues of $25 per player. The team never actually played at the club, not even in playdowns as no other team from the club challenged them. The team's second Larry Merkley held the broom for Russ instead of Glenn. The team would go on to finish with a 5–4 record, losing in a tiebreaker game to Bill Walsh of Ottawa's Navy Club.

=== 1985–1989 ===
After university, Howard joined back up with his brother Russ, playing third for the rink. Playing with his brother, he would go on to win two Briers and two World Championships.

The team, which also consisted of frontenders Tim Belcourt and Kent Carstairs, first found success at the 1986 Blue Light Tankard, the provincial championship, where they had to win two playoff games before beating Wayne Tallon of Ottawa in the final. The win earned the team the right to represent Ontario at the 1986 Labatt Brier. At the Brier, the team finished the round robin with a 9–2 record, tied for top spot. In the playoffs, they beat British Columbia (Barry McPhee) in the semifinal before losing to Alberta's Ed Lukowich rink in the final.

The Howard rink won their second straight provincial title in 1987, defeating Ed Werenich in the final after beating Paul Savage in the semifinal. At the 1987 Labatt Brier, the team finished atop the table with a 9–2 record. This put them directly into the final, where they British Columbia, skipped by Bernie Sparkes. The win earned the rink the right to represent Canada at the 1987 World Men's Curling Championship. There, they finished the round robin in second place with a 7–2 record, behind Norway's Eigil Ramsfjell team. In the playoffs, the team beat Denmark (skipped by Gert Larsen) in the semifinals, and then beat West Germany (Rodger Schmidt) in the final, after they had beaten Norway in their semifinal. The team wrapped up the season at the 1987 Canadian Olympic Curling Trials, which were held to determine Canada's Olympic team at the 1988 Winter Olympics where curling was a demonstration sport. Despite being World Champions, the rink did not fare as well there, finishing with a 4–3 record, and losing to their provincial rivals in Ed Werenich in a tiebreaker.

The Howard rink had their best ever round robin showing up to that point at the 1988 provincial championships, finishing in first with a 7–2 record, giving them a bye into the final. There, they faced off against Savage again, who had Werenich throwing third stones on the team. Both Howards missed some crucial shots in the final, and ended up losing to Savage. Glenn ended up sharing the all-star third award for the tournament.

The team won another provincial championship in 1989, defeating Werenich in the final. Glenn was named as the tournament's all-star third again. At the 1989 Labatt Brier, the team finished the round robin portion in a three-way tie for first at 8–3. In the playoffs, the rink were eliminated after losing to BC's Rick Folk team in the semifinal.

=== 1989–1994 ===
The team began the 1989–90 season with a new front end consisting of "a couple of former junior hotshots from Brampton" in cousins Wayne Middaugh and Peter Corner. Their first provincial championship was not a success however, as they ended up losing in the semifinal of the 1990 men's championship to Bob Fedosa of Brampton.

The Howard four with Middaugh and Corner playing front end won their first provincial championship at the 1991 Blue Light Tankard, defeating London's Kirk Ziola in the final. The team capitalized on a Ziola miss in the second, and then proceeded to hit everything in sight, to win the match 3–1, in an example of the low scoring defence oriented style in the pre free-guard zone era of curling. At the 1991 Labatt Brier, the team did not fare very well, finishing with a 6–5 record, missing the playoffs.

The team won their second straight provincial Tankard in 1992, defeating future Olympic silver medallist Mike Harris and his Toronto Tam Heather rink in the final. Harris was playing in his first provincial championship. Up to that point in the season, the rink had won over $100,000 in cashspiels and had lost just four games in 55 matches. The team had a better showing at the 1992 Labatt Brier, finishing the round robin with an 8–3 record, in second place. In the semifinal, the team downed Alberta's Kevin Martin rink, but they fell short in the final, losing to Vic Peters and Manitoba.

The team faced off against Harris again in the final of the 1993 Ontario championship, and once again prevailed, winning their third straight Ontario title. Glenn was once again named as the tournament's all-star third. A week later, the team played in the 1993 Seagram's VO Cup, the inaugural edition of the Players' Championship, the marquee event of the first World Curling Tour season. The team headed into the event ranked fourth on the tour, and ended up winning the event, defeating Paul Savage in the final. Two weeks later, the team represented Ontario at the 1993 Labatt Brier. There, the team finished the round in a four way tie for first with an 8–3 record. The necessitated a four-way tie breaker, in which the team won both games, giving them a bye to the final. In the final, they beat British Columbia's Rick Folk rink to win Howard's second Brier title. Representing Canada the 1993 World Men's Curling Championship, the team led the round robin table with a 7–2 record, tied with Scotland's David Smith rink. The team beat the United States (Scott Baird) in the semifinal, and then beat Scotland in the final, to win the World Championship, Howard's second.

The rink won a fourth straight provincial title at the 1994 Ontario Tankard, defeating an upstart Axel Larsen rink from Guelph in the final. Following their win, there were rumours during the event that the team would decline the opportunity to represent Ontario at the 1994 Labatt Brier due to a dispute over not being allowed to use their sponsors on their sweaters. The team did go on to play at the 1994 Brier, going 8–3 in round robin play. In the semifinal final, they beat Manitoba (Dave Smith), but were stymied in the final where Rick Folk's British Columbia rink finally got the better of them.

=== 1994–2000 ===
In 1994, Middaugh left the team to start his own rink. The team added Ken McDermot at lead position, with Corner moving to second. McDermot had previously played on the Bob Fedosa rink. The team tried to win a record fifth straight provincial championship at the 1995 Ontario Tankard. They finished the round robin tied for first with a 7–2 record, and earned a bye-to the final. However, they lost the final to Ed Werenich in a come-from behind extra end game. The team finished the season with over $100,000 in winnings on the tour.

In 1995, McDermot was replaced by Noel Herron of Guelph, who had previously played for Paul Savage. At the 1996 provincial championship, the team once again topped the table with a 7–2 record, tied for first, but with a bye-to the final. And, for the second year in a row, the team lost in the Ontario final, this time to Bob Ingram of Ridgetown.

The team continued to juggle its front end in an attempt to qualify for the 1998 Winter Olympics. In 1996, the Howards added 1994 Northern Ontario champions Scott Patterson and Phil Loevenmark to the team, replacing Corner and Herron. With the addition of the two Northerners, the rink considered curling out of Northern Ontario for the season. The team ultimately decided to continue to curl out of Southern Ontario for playdowns that season. At the 1997 provincial championship, the team did not fare as well as usual, finishing the round robin with a 5–4 record, tied with the Peter Steski rink from Ottawa City View. The team beat Steski in the tiebreaker, but ultimately lost in the semifinal to their rival Ed Werenich, in a game played just 90 minutes after tiebreaker. At the end of the season, the team won the 1997 World Curling Tour Championship (now called the Players' Championship), defeating Randy Woytowich of Saskatchewan in the final. It was the second title for the Howard brothers, after having won the inaugural event in 1993. The win earned the team a spot at the 1997 Canadian Olympic Curling Trials.

In 1997, the team again shuffled their front end, despite qualifying for the Olympic Trials, adding Herron back at second, and his junior teammate Steve Small from Toronto. Patterson and Loevenmark did not want to remain on the team due to new residency rules, which would have required the North Bay residents to take six months off of work to continue to play out of the south. Despite the change, the team had to play with Patterson and Loevenmark at the 1997 Olympic Trials which were held in November, as the Canadian Curling Association rules dictated that the team had to have at least three of the four players that had qualified for the event. At the Olympic trials, the team had a disappointing showing, finishing with a 3–6 record, thanks in part to a lingering knee injury for brother Russ. With Herron and Small playing front end, the team played in the 1998 Ontario Nokia Cup provincial championship. They again finished with a 5–4 record, this time tied with Phil Daniel of Tilbury. The team went on to lose to Daniel in a tiebreaker.

Russ Howard moved to Moncton, New Brunswick in September 1998 after joining a company that was building a housing development on a golf course. He continued to skip the team for the 1998–99 cashspiel circuit, along with a new front end of Peter Corner and Neil Harrison. The team won a couple of major bonspiels early in the season, before Russ and Glenn parted for the playdown season, with Russ forming a rink in New Brunswick, and Glenn skipping the team in the Ontario playdowns with Todd Tsukamoto playing lead. The team stuck together for the 1999–00 cashspiel season, but Russ played out of New Brunswick to go to the Brier, while second Corner formed his own team in Ontario, and won the provincial Tankard that season.

=== 2000–2004 ===
Howard formed his own Ontario-based team in 2000 with 1998 Olympic silver medallists Richard Hart and Collin Mitchell who had left the Mike Harris rink, plus Collin's brother Jason at lead. The team played in their first provincial championship, at the 2001 Ontario Nokia Cup, Howards's first as a skip. The team finished the round robin with a 7–2 record in a tie for first place. They lost both of their playoff games however, against Wayne Middaugh in the 1 vs. 2 game, and John Morris in the semifinal.

Earlier in the 2001–02 season, Team Howard won the TSN Skins Game, defeating Kevin Martin in the event's final, and taking home $77,200.

Howard spared for his brother's New Brunswick-based team at the 2001 Canadian Olympic Curling Trials, as the team's regular second, Rick Perron could not play due to a knee injury. Glenn played third on the team, with regular third James Grattan moving to second. At the Trials, the team finished with a 5–4 record, missing the playoffs.

Team Glenn Howard was one of 18 rinks in the country to boycott the Brier in 2002 and 2003 due to a lack of prize money and inability to have sponsors. The team opted to play in the new Grand Slam of Curling series instead. The Howard rink won their first Grand Slam event in its inaugural season at the 2002 M&M Meat Shops National, the third slam of the season, defeating Greg McAulay in the final, winning $30,000 in the process.

Howard won his second slam at the 2004 National, defeating Jeff Stoughton in the playoffs. A week later, the team played in the 2004 Ontario Men's Curling Championship, as the two-year boycott of many top curlers against the Brier had ended the previous fall. The team headed into the event as the number three team on the tour, and were the favourites. At the provincial championships, the team led the round robin with a 7–2 record, tied with Mike Harris. They beat Harris in the page playoff 1 vs. 2 game, but could not beat him in the final.

=== 2004–2011 ===
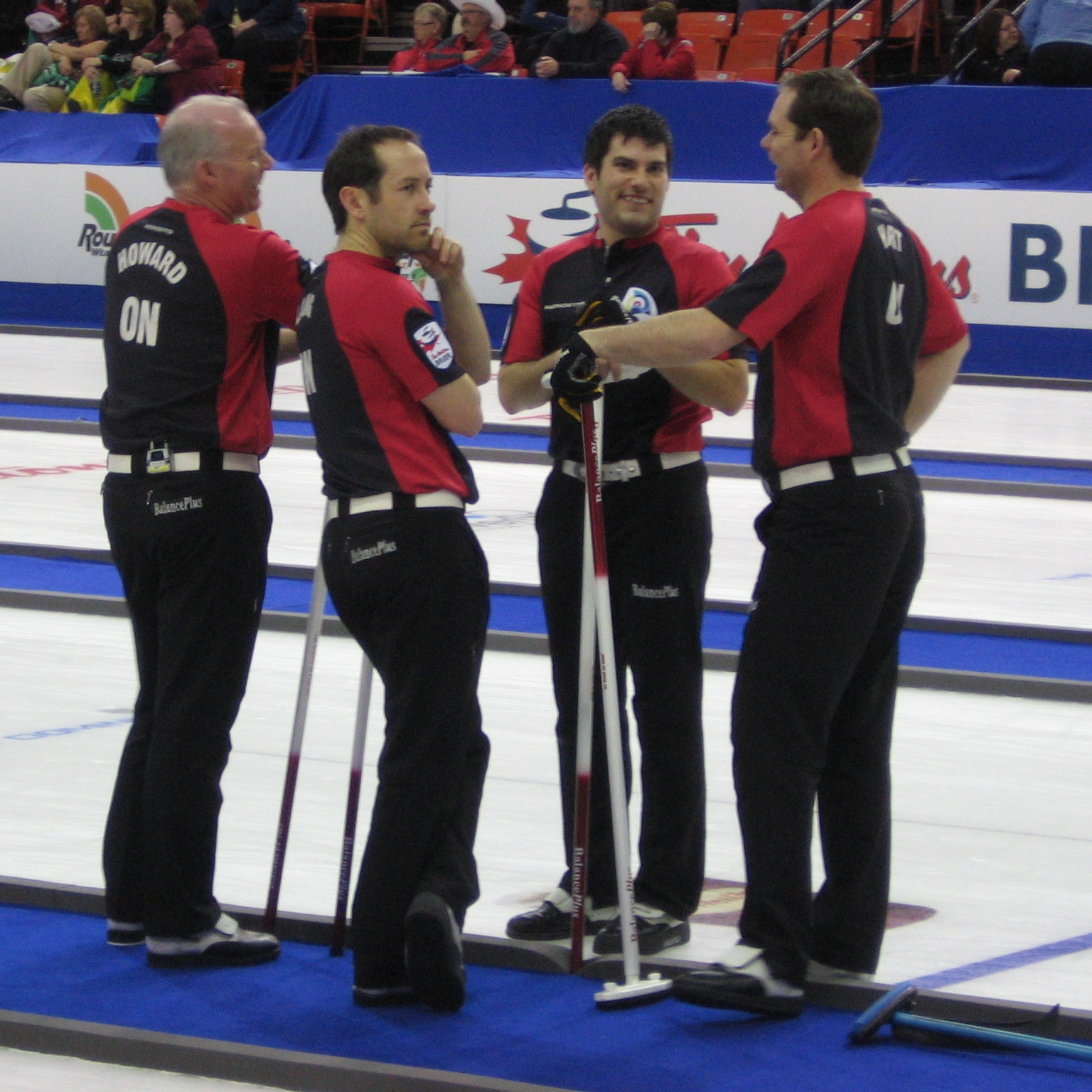
Howard (left) and his team (Brent Laing, Craig Savill and Richard Hart) at the 2010 Tim Hortons Brier. These four would constitute the Howard rink from 2004 to 2011.

Team Howard began the 2004–05 season with a new front end of Brent Laing and Craig Savill, and a new sponsor in Trojan Condoms, which drew quite a bit of attention to the team. The team played in the 2005 Ontario Kia Cup provincial championship, where they finished with 7–2 round robin record again. In the playoffs, they beat former teammate Wayne Middaugh in the 1 vs. 2 game, but could not beat him in the final.

The team qualified for the 2005 Canadian Olympic Curling Trials, thanks to a Kevin Martin win at the 2005 Canada Cup of Curling, an event Howard was not even in. At the Trials, the team finished 5–4, missing the playoffs. At the 2006 Ontario Kia Cup, the team went 7–2 once again, but this time won both their playoff games, including a triumph over Middaugh in the final, finally returning Howard to the Brier. At the 2006 Tim Hortons Brier, the team dominated, finishing the round robin with only one loss. However, the team was not successful in the final, losing to Quebec's Jean-Michel Ménard 8–7 in a surprise defeat.

Howard's team dominated the 2006–07 season. They won their first big event at the 2006 Masters of Curling, where Howard won his third career grand slam event, beating Randy Ferbey in the final. The team marched right through the 2007 provincial championships without losing a single game, and with none even going a complete ten ends. At the 2007 Tim Hortons Brier, the team lost just one round-robin game, and that was against Alberta's Kevin Martin. The team lost another game in the Page playoff 1 vs. 2 game to Olympic gold medallist Brad Gushue of Newfoundland and Labrador. However, in the re-match against Gushue in the final, Team Howard won 10–6. Howard's team continued its dominance at the 2007 Ford World Men's Curling Championship. The team lost just one game in the round-robin, that being Team USA (skipped by Todd Birr). However, they avenged this loss by beating the Americans 7–2 in the page playoff game and then winning the final over the Germans skipped by Andy Kapp, 8–3.

The team won another Masters in January 2008 against Kevin Koe, and then won the 2008 provincial championship two weeks later. The team lost just one game in the round robin, and lost to Peter Corner in the 1 vs.2 game. They rebounded in the semifinal against Mike Harris, and then beat Corner in the final. In their attempt to repeat at the 2008 Tim Hortons Brier, Team Howard lost 5–4 in the final to Alberta, skipped by Kevin Martin. Howard had gone 9–2 in round robin play, and won all of their playoff games before losing to Martin. The team finished the season by winning the 2008 Players' Championship in St. John's against Martin in the final. Howard finished the tournament with a perfect record. It was Howard's fifth career Slam event win, and with it came a berth at the 2009 Canadian Olympic Curling Trials.

Team Howard won their third straight Masters in November 2008, beating Koe again in the final. Howard became only the third skip to win a career Grand Slam, having won all four Grand Slam majors, when he won the 2009 Canadian Open. The team beat Kevin Martin in the final, one of the other two skips to have won a career Grand Slam (Wayne Middaugh also had won a career Grand Slam).

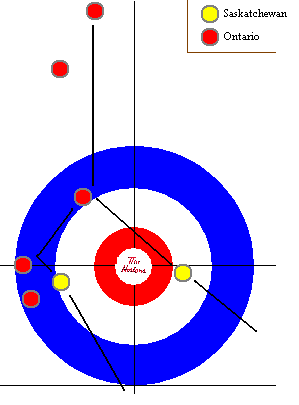
Howard's last shot in a round robin game against Saskatchewan at the 2009 Brier is considered to be one of the best curling shots ever.

Howard lost just one game en route to winning the 2009 provincial championship, including beating former teammate Peter Corner in the final. This qualified the rink for the 2009 Tim Hortons Brier in Calgary. Many were looking forward to Howard's performance at the Brier. Firstly, his older brother Russ was skipping the New Brunswick team, and secondly, a re-match with the rival Kevin Martin team. Howard's rink finished the round robin in second place with a 9–2 record. His last match of the round robin was against Martin, as was the first playoff match up. Howard lost both games, as well as his next playoff game against Jeff Stoughton's Manitoba rink. Despite this, Howard is probably most remembered at the 2009 Brier for a shot regarded as one of the greatest in curling history. In a round robin match against Saskatchewan, Howard was down by two with his last shot of the game. He only had one shot to win the game. Howard was facing two Saskatchewan stones, which were too far apart and too even to take out both. Howard had three rocks in the 12 foot. With his rock, Howard knocked one of his rocks onto another of his rocks, deflecting into one of the Saskatchewan stones, removing it while sticking, while his shooter rock had ricocheted off the first Ontario rock onto the other Saskatchewan stone, taking it out as well, while sticking too. With those two Ontario rocks, plus the other one that remained stationary, Ontario scored three to win the game. The shot was mentioned by Chris Plys on The Colbert Report during a curling segment.

Team Howard began the 2009–10 curling season, by winning their fourth straight Masters championship by winning the 2009 World Cup of Curling, (the event was called the World Cup for the next three seasons) defeating Kevin Koe in the final. A month and a half later, the team played in the 2009 Canadian Olympic Curling Trials for a chance to play at the 2010 Winter Olympics at home in Canada. The rink went 6–1 in the round robin, tied for first with rivals Kevin Martin. They beat Jeff Stoughton in the semifinal, but could not beat Martin, who went on to win the gold medal at the Vancouver Olympics. While Martin was off at the Olympics, Howard swept through the 2010 Ontario Men's Curling Championship, going undefeated, including beating Bryan Cochrane in the final. At the 2010 Tim Hortons Brier, Howard finished the round robin with an undefeated 11–0 record, but lost in the Final to Alberta's Kevin Koe.

Howard won his lone career Canada Cup championship in 2010, beating Kevin Martin in the final. Former teammate Wayne Middaugh replaced Richard Hart as the team's third for the event, as Hart wanted a reduced schedule for the 2010–11 season. At the 2011 provincial championship, the rink finished the round robin with an 8–2, tied for first place with Peter Corner. The team defeated Peter Corner in the playoffs, and Greg Balsdon in the final, sending the rink to the 2011 Tim Hortons Brier. There, the rink finished the round robin with an 8–3 record, in fourth place. In the playoffs, they beat Alberta (Kevin Martin) in the 3 vs. 4 game, then Newfoundland and Labrador (Brad Gushue) before losing to Manitoba (Jeff Stoughton) in the final. The rink finished the 2010–11 season with a semifinal loss to Niklas Edin at the 2011 Players' Championship. At the end of the season, longtime third Richard Hart announced that he would was retiring from competitive curling, and was replaced with Middaugh.

=== 2011–2014 ===
With Wayne Middaugh now throwing third stones on the team, the Howard rink won its fifth Masters at the 2011 World Cup of Curling, defeating John Epping in the final. They won their second slam of the season in January at the 2012 Pomeroy Inn & Suites National, beating Kevin Martin for the title. The team swept through the 2012 provincial championship, going undefeated, and beating Middaugh's cousin and former teammate Peter Corner in the final. At the 2012 Tim Hortons Brier, they continued their domination losing just on match, and beating Alberta's Kevin Koe rink in the final to win Howard's fourth Brier championship, and the final in his career. The rink represented Canada at the 2012 World Men's Curling Championship, where they again lost just one game. The team defeated Scotland (Tom Brewster) in the final to capture Howard's 4th world title.

Howard won his 11th Grand Slam title at the 2012 Canadian Open of Curling, defeating future Olympic gold medallist Brad Jacobs in the final. In January, Howard won the 2013 All-Star Skins Game, his second career TSN skins game as a skip. The event featured random teams, and Howard was teamed up with John Morris, Carter Rycroft and Steve Gould. This team won $51,000 at the event, and beat Kevin Koe for the title. Howard with his regular team won the 2013 provincial championship again. They finished the round robin with a 7–3 record, tied for second place. In the playoffs, they beat Joe Frans twice to win Howard's 15th provincial title, and eighth straight. At the 2013 Tim Hortons Brier, Howard would once again represent the province of Ontario. Howard and team would go 10–1 in the round robin, giving themselves a spot in the Page 1-2 game. Team Howard would go on to lose to Manitoba's Jeff Stoughton in the page playoff and to eventual Brier champion, Northern Ontario's Brad Jacobs in the semi-final. The rink finished the season by winning the 2013 Players' Championship, defeating Mike McEwen in the final.

The rink began the 2013–14 season by winning The Masters, beating Kevin Martin in the final. It was Howard's career sixth Masters title, and final Grand Slam win. By being the CTRS leader for the 2011-2012 season, Team Howard clinched a spot in 2013 Canadian Olympic Curling Trials. There, the team would end up missing the playoffs, finishing 2–5 and in a tie for 6th place with Kevin Koe. Team Howard would go on to play in the 2014 Ontario Provincials, where they went 7–3 in the round robin. In the 1 vs. 2 game, they beat Greg Balsdon, but lost to him in the final. Thus ending Howard's record eight-straight provincial championship run. Howard won his 14th career Slam at the March 2014 National, defeating Brad Gushue in the final. At the end of the 2013–2014 season, Glenn Howard announced that second Brent Laing would be leaving the team and going to Alberta to join with Kevin Koe's new rink. On April 13, the team announced the new team would consist of former third Richard Hart who was coming out of retirement, Jon Mead, who had left Team Jeff Stoughton, and maintaining lead Craig Savill. Wayne Middaugh wanted to take a break from the game.

=== 2014–2018 ===
Howard's new team would not have much success in their lone season together, failing to even qualify for the 2015 provincial championships. The team was eliminated in regionals by Aaron Squires, with some suggesting poor ice conditions at the Gravenhurst Curling Club were to blame. The team had a second chance to make it through the last chance challenge round, but lost both their games against Brent Ross and Scott McDonald, failing to advance.

For the 2015–16 curling season, Wayne Middaugh joined the team once again at third, as did Glenn's son, Scott at lead, with Savill leaving the team. Hart moved to second. Middaugh left the team mid-season following a skiing incident and was replaced by Adam Spencer, who played second on the team with Hart back at third. The team won the 2016 Ontario Tankard provincial championship, losing just the 1 vs. 2 game, where they were downed by John Epping. They beat Epping in the final, and went on to represent Ontario at the 2016 Tim Hortons Brier. At the Brier, Howard led the province to a 4–7 round robin record.

During the 2016 off season, David Mathers, a former teammate of son Scott, joined the team at second, with Middaugh unable to commit to the season following his injury. Hart moved back to third. The rink went 6–3 through the round robin at the 2017 Ontario Tankard, and then won both playoff games to win Howard's record 17th provincial championship. They beat Wayne Tuck Jr. in the final. At the 2017 Tim Hortons Brier, Howard led his Ontario foursome to a 4–7 record.

In 2017, Hart was not able to play for the team following a knee injury, and was replaced by Adam Spencer. The rink played in the 2017 Olympic Pre-Trials. They went 6–0 in round robin play, but were eliminated in the playoffs, making it as far as the "B" final, ending the team's Olympic qualifying run. At the 2018 Ontario Tankard, the team went undefeated until the final, where they lost to John Epping.

=== 2018–2024 ===
In 2018, Tim March who had been playing for Team John Epping, joined the team at lead, with son Scott replacing Spencer at third. The new lineup proved unsuccessful at their first Ontario Tankard in 2019. After going 7–2 in the round robin, and beating Alberta-transplant Charley Thomas in the 3 vs. 4 game, they lost to Epping in the semifinal. The next year, the team went 6–2 at the 2020 Ontario Tankard. They beat the defending champion Scott McDonald rink in the semifinal, but lost to Epping again in the final.

There was no provincial championship in 2021 due to the COVID-19 pandemic in Ontario. Team Epping were invited to represent the province at the 2021 Tim Hortons Brier. Due to the pandemic, the Brier was expanded by two teams, and the Howard rink qualified as Wild Card #3 based on their CTRS ranking. Unfortunately, Howard himself suffered a snowmobile accident that winter, breaking several ribs in the process, and so the team invited Wayne Middaugh to come out of retirement to skip the team. Howard still attended the event with the team, and used his role to voice his displeasure with the team not being notified that the rocks had been 'papered' during the event despite other rinks being aware. He also threw some stones for the team in their game against the Yukon. Middaugh led the rink to an 8–4 record, just missing the three-team playoff.

While it was thought that 2017 would be Howard's last Olympic run, the team attempted to qualify for the 2021 Canadian Olympic Curling Trials. Their first attempt to qualify came at the 2021 Canadian Curling Trials Direct-Entry Event, where they just missed out on the last spot after finishing with a 2–3 record. Next, the team played in the 2021 Canadian Olympic Curling Pre-Trials. There, the team went 5–1 in pool play, but were knocked out in their final playoff game against Tanner Horgan, who qualified for the Trials with the win. Despite the loss, Howard was invited to be the alternate for Team John Epping at the Trials. There, the Epping rink went 3–5.

Lingering knee pain kept Howard out of the 2022 Ontario Tankard playdowns. The team played with three players for much of the season, but brought back Adam Spencer to throw third stones, while Glenn's son Scott skipped at the Tankard. The Glenn-less team won the Tankard, qualifying the rink for the 2022 Tim Hortons Brier. Glenn's knee recovered in time for the Brier, where he led the team to a 4–4 record. At the event, he won a career 100th Brier game after the team beat the Yukon. In July 2022, Howard underwent surgery to fix meniscus and tendon issues in his knee.

At the 2023 Ontario Tankard, the Howard rink went undefeated in pool play and in the championship round, only to lose in the final to the Manitoban Mike McEwen, and his Toronto-based rink which consisted of former Team Howard member Brent Laing, and former teammate Richard Hart's son, Joey.

In December 2023, while playing in the Nufloors Penticton Curling Classic, Howard's knee "seized up" after playing in four games. His injury forced him to miss the rest of the tournament, in which son Scott led the shorthanded team to win the event. He would not play in any games for the rest of the season. Scott led the rest of the team to win the 2024 Ontario Tankard. At the 2024 Montana's Brier, the team brought in Mathew Camm to throw second stones, with Mathers throwing third stones. Scott led the team to a 3–5 record. Following the season, Howard retired from competitive curling. He will continue to coach the team, for the 2024–25 season, with Scott skipping a rink of Mathew Camm, Camm's brother Jason, and March continuing to throwing lead.

=== Coaching ===
In 2016, Howard was announced as the tactical coach of Team Eve Muirhead's Scottish rink. It was his first time coaching a top level curling team. Howard coached Muirhead rink at the 2018 Winter Olympics, where they were the Great Britain Women's Curling team. The team reached the semi-finals at the expense of their Canadian counterparts; Howard said, "Too bad Canada were knocked out, but we've got a job to do and I'm really proud of the girls".

After 2018, Howard did not coach until 2022, when it was announced that he would coach the Jennifer Jones women's curling team He remained as Jones' coach until her retirement in 2024. He continued to coach the team when Jones was replaced by Chelsea Carey, until the team disbanded in January 2025. In February, it was announced that Howard would coach the Kate Cameron rink at the 2025 Scotties Tournament of Hearts.

Later in his career while injured, Howard would often coach his team. When he announced his retirement from playing in 2024, he announced he would continue to coach the team, which would be skipped by son Scott.

In addition to coaching his son Scott's team, Glenn also coaches his daughter Carly's rink.

At the last minute, Howard was added as an assistant coach of the Swiss team at the 2025 World Men's Curling Championship.

== Personal life ==
Howard is the son of Bill Howard, a former grocery store manager, ice maker and curling club manager from Midland, Ontario and Barbara Howard of Penetanguishene.

Howard works for Brewers Retail Inc. as a consultant and spokesperson. He currently resides in Tiny, Ontario. He is married and has two children, who are both curlers themselves, Scott and Carly. Howard made a guest appearance on the CBC comedy Little Mosque on the Prairie on the season 2 episode titled "Jihad on Ice". In the Fall of 2013, he was inducted into the Penetanguishene Sports Hall of Fame.

== Career statistics ==
=== Grand Slam record ===
Key
C	Champion
F	Lost in Final
SF	Lost in Semifinal
QF	Lost in Quarterfinals
R16	Lost in the round of 16
Q	Did not advance to playoffs
T2	Played in Tier 2 event
DNP	Did not participate in event
N/A	Not a Grand Slam event that season

Event	2001–02	2002–03	2003–04	2004–05	2005–06	2006–07	2007–08	2008–09	2009–10	2010–11	2011–12	2012–13	2013–14	2014–15	2015–16	2016–17	2017–18	2018–19	2019–20	2020–21	2021–22	2022–23
Elite 10	N/A	N/A	N/A	N/A	N/A	N/A	N/A	N/A	N/A	N/A	N/A	N/A	N/A	Q	DNP	DNP	SF	QF	N/A	N/A	N/A	N/A
The National	C	F	C	SF	SF	QF	DNP	Q	SF	SF	C	Q	C	QF	SF	DNP	DNP	SF	Q	N/A	Q	Q
Tour Challenge	N/A	N/A	N/A	N/A	N/A	N/A	N/A	N/A	N/A	N/A	N/A	N/A	N/A	N/A	QF	T2	Q	SF	QF	N/A	N/A	DNP
Masters	QF	SF	DNP	DNP	SF	C	C	C	C	SF	C	Q	C	Q	Q	Q	DNP	Q	DNP	N/A	DNP	DNP
Canadian Open	SF	F	Q	SF	Q	SF	QF	C	F	F	SF	C	SF	Q	Q	DNP	DNP	QF	QF	N/A	N/A	DNP
Players'	QF	QF	Q	SF	QF	QF	C	F	QF	SF	F	C	Q	Q	QF	DNP	DNP	QF	N/A	DNP	DNP	DNP
Champions Cup	N/A	N/A	N/A	N/A	N/A	N/A	N/A	N/A	N/A	N/A	N/A	N/A	N/A	N/A	DNP	DNP	F	DNP	N/A	DNP	DNP	DNP

=== Teams ===
Season	Skip	Third	Second	Lead
1979–80	Glenn Howard	Paul Harbottle	Peter Mount	Tim Tully
1980–81	Glenn Howard	Paul Harbottle	Peter Mount	Tim Tully
1981–82	Glenn Howard	Craig Reed	Bruce Gall	Peter Osbourne
1982–83	Russ Howard	Glenn Howard	Larry Merkley	Kent Carstairs
1983–84	Glenn Howard	Paul Godward	Brad Watson	Tony Wagner
1985–86	Russ Howard	Glenn Howard	Tim Belcourt	Kent Carstairs
1986–87	Russ Howard	Glenn Howard	Tim Belcourt	Kent Carstairs
1987–88	Russ Howard	Glenn Howard	Tim Belcourt	Kent Carstairs
1988–89	Russ Howard	Glenn Howard	Tim Belcourt	Kent Carstairs
1989–90	Russ Howard	Glenn Howard	Wayne Middaugh	Peter Corner
1990–91	Russ Howard	Glenn Howard	Wayne Middaugh	Peter Corner
1991–92	Russ Howard	Glenn Howard	Wayne Middaugh	Peter Corner
1992–93	Russ Howard	Glenn Howard	Wayne Middaugh	Peter Corner
1993–94	Russ Howard	Glenn Howard	Wayne Middaugh	Peter Corner
1994–95	Russ Howard	Glenn Howard	Peter Corner	Ken McDermot
1995–96	Russ Howard	Glenn Howard	Peter Corner	Noel Herron
1996–97	Russ Howard	Glenn Howard	Scott Patterson	Phil Loevenmark
1997–98	Russ Howard	Glenn Howard	Noel Herron	Steve Small
1998–99	Russ Howard	Glenn Howard	Peter Corner	Neil Harrison
1999–00	Russ Howard	Glenn Howard	Peter Corner	Neil Harrison
2000–01	Glenn Howard	Richard Hart	Collin Mitchell	Jason Mitchell
2001–02	Glenn Howard	Richard Hart	Collin Mitchell	Jason Mitchell
2002–03	Glenn Howard	Richard Hart	Collin Mitchell	Jason Mitchell
2003–04	Glenn Howard	Richard Hart	Collin Mitchell	Jason Mitchell
2004–05	Glenn Howard	Richard Hart	Brent Laing	Craig Savill
2005–06	Glenn Howard	Richard Hart	Brent Laing	Craig Savill
2006–07	Glenn Howard	Richard Hart	Brent Laing	Craig Savill
2007–08	Glenn Howard	Richard Hart	Brent Laing	Craig Savill
2008–09	Glenn Howard	Richard Hart	Brent Laing	Craig Savill
2009–10	Glenn Howard	Richard Hart	Brent Laing	Craig Savill
2010–11	Glenn Howard	Richard Hart	Brent Laing	Craig Savill
2011–12	Glenn Howard	Wayne Middaugh	Brent Laing	Craig Savill
2012–13	Glenn Howard	Wayne Middaugh	Brent Laing	Craig Savill
2013–14	Glenn Howard	Wayne Middaugh	Brent Laing	Craig Savill
2014–15	Glenn Howard	Richard Hart	Jon Mead	Craig Savill
2015–16	Glenn Howard	Wayne Middaugh (Note: Wayne Middaugh was injured and unable to play in the 2016 Ontario Provincial Championships and Brier. He was replaced by Adam Spencer at second, moving Hart up to third.)	Richard Hart	Scott Howard
2016–17	Glenn Howard	Richard Hart	David Mathers	Scott Howard
2017–18	Glenn Howard	Adam Spencer	David Mathers	Scott Howard
2018–19	Glenn Howard	Scott Howard	David Mathers	Tim March
2019–20	Glenn Howard	Scott Howard	David Mathers	Tim March
2020–21	Glenn Howard	Scott Howard	David Mathers	Tim March
2021–22	Glenn Howard	Scott Howard	David Mathers	Tim March
2022–23	Glenn Howard	Scott Howard	David Mathers	Tim March
2023–24	Glenn Howard	Scott Howard	David Mathers	Tim March

== See also ==
- List of University of Waterloo people
