= 2008 The National =

Grand Slam of Curling event

The National 2008
- Host city: Quebec City, Quebec
- Arena: ExpoCité
- Dates: December 3–7, 2008
- Winner: (Ontario) Team Middaugh
- Curling club: St. George's G&CC, Toronto, ON
- Skip: Wayne Middaugh
- Third: Jon Mead
- Second: John Epping
- Lead: Scott Bailey
- Finalist: (Newfoundland and Labrador) Team Gushue

The 2008 edition of The National was held December 3–7, 2008 at the ExpoCité in Quebec City, Quebec. It was the second Grand Slam event of the men's 2008-09 World Curling Tour season.

== Teams ==
Skip	Third	Second	Lead	Locale
Shawn Adams	Paul Flemming	Craig Burgess	Kelly Mittelstadt	Halifax, Nova Scotia
Kerry Burtnyk	Don Walchuk	Richard Daneault	Garth Smith	Winnipeg, Manitoba
David Nedohin	Randy Ferbey (skip)	Scott Pfeifer	Marcel Rocque	Edmonton, Alberta
Martin Ferland	Philippe Lemay	Marco Berthelot	Christian Cantin	Trois-Rivières, Quebec
Brad Gushue	Mark Nichols	Ryan Fry	Jamie Korab	St. John's, Newfoundland and Labrador
Glenn Howard	Richard Hart	Brent Laing	Craig Savill	Coldwater, Ontario
Joel Jordison	Scott Bitz	Aryn Schmidt	Dean Hicke	Moose Jaw, Saskatchewan
Blake MacDonald	Kevin Koe (skip)	Carter Rycroft	Nolan Thiessen	Edmonton, Alberta
Jason Larway	Colin Hufman	Joel Larway	Bill Todhunter	(United States) Seattle, Washington
Kevin Martin	John Morris	Marc Kennedy	Ben Hebert	Edmonton, Alberta
Greg McAulay	Ken Maskiewich	Tyrel Griffith	Aaron Watson	Richmond, British Columbia
Mike McEwen	B. J. Neufeld	Matt Wozniak	Denni Neufeld	Winnipeg, Manitoba
Jean-Michel Ménard	Martin Crête	Éric Sylvain	Jean Gagnon	Quebec City, Quebec
Wayne Middaugh	Jon Mead	John Epping	Scott Bailey	Toronto, Ontario
Pat Simmons	Jeff Sharp	Gerry Adam	Steve Laycock	Davidson, Saskatchewan
Jeff Stoughton	Kevin Park	Rob Fowler	Steve Gould	Winnipeg, Manitoba
Jim Cotter	Bob Ursel (skip)	Kevin Folk	Rick Sawatsky	Kelowna, British Columbia
Wang Fengchun	Liu Rui	Xu Xiao Ming	Zang Jia Liang	Harbin, China

(Money ranking in parentheses)

== Pool A ==
Team	W	L
(Manitoba) Burtnyk (14)	4	1
(Manitoba) McEwen (27)	4	1
(Ontario) Middaugh (17)	4	1
(Nova Scotia) Adams (86)	2	3
(Ontario) Howard (1)	1	4
(United States) Larway (36)	0	5

- Howard 6-2 Larway
- Burtnyk 5-3 McEwen
- Middaugh 7-2 Adams
- Middaugh 5-3 Larway
- McEwen 5-4 Howard (9)
- Burtnyk 6-3 Adams
- McEwen 8-4 Middaugh
- Burtnyk 6-5 Howard (9)
- Adams 6-1 Larway
- Middaugh 6-3 Burtnyk
- Adams 6-0 Howard
- McEwen 6-3 Larway
- McEwen 4-3 Adams
- Burtnyk 7-3 Larway
- Middaugh 6-5 Howard

== Pool B ==
Team	W	L
(Alberta) Martin (2)	5	0
(Newfoundland and Labrador) Gushue (4)	4	1
(British Columbia) McAulay (24)	2	3
(Saskatchewan) Simmons (42)	2	3
(Quebec) Ménard (30)	2	3
(China) Wang (10)	0	5

- Ménard 7-6 Simmons
- McAulay 9-8 Wang (9)
- Martin 7-6 Gushue (9)
- Martin 6-3 McAulay
- Simmons 7-5 Wang
- Gushue 5-4 Ménard
- Gushue 6-3 McAulay
- Martin 5-3 Simmons
- Gushue 6-4 Wang
- Martin 6-4 Ménard
- Simmons 6-4 McAulay
- McAulay 7-6 Ménard
- Gushue 3-2 Simmons
- Martin 6-3 Wang
- Ménard 8-4 Wang

== Pool C ==
Team	W	L
(Manitoba) Stoughton (6)	5	0
(Alberta) Ferbey (3)	3	2
(Quebec) Ferland (137)	3	2
(Alberta) Koe (8)	2	3
(Saskatchewan) Jordison (9)	1	4
(British Columbia) Ursel (28)	1	4

- Ferland 5-2 Koe
- Stoughton 6-3 Ursel
- Ferbey 9-4 Jordison
- Ursel 6-4 Ferland
- Koe 12-5 Jordison
- Stoughton 7-5 Ferbey
- Jordison 5-4 Ursel
- Stoughton 6-5 Ferland (9)
- Ferbey 7-3 Ursel
- Stoughton 8-6 Koe
- Ferland 5-4 Jordison
- Koe 6-4 Ursel
- Ferland 6-3 Ferbey
- Stoughton 4-3 Jordison
- Ferbey 6-2 Koe

== Playoffs ==
Playoffs

Quarter-Finals
(Alberta) Martin	5
(Quebec) Ferland	4
(Manitoba) Burtnyk	5
(Ontario) Middaugh	6
(Manitoba) Stoughton	6
(Alberta) Ferbey	7
(Newfoundland and Labrador) Gushue (EE)	5
(Manitoba) McEwen	4

Semi-Finals
(Alberta) Martin	2
(Ontario) Middaugh	5
(Alberta) Ferbey	5
(Newfoundland and Labrador) Gushue	6

Final
(Ontario) Middaugh	5
(Newfoundland and Labrador) Gushue	3

Final

Sheet C	1	2	3	4	5	6	7	8	Final
(Ontario) Middaugh	0	0	0	1	0	0	1	2	5
(Newfoundland and Labrador) Gushue 🔨	0	1	1	0	1	0	0	0	3
