= 2011 World Cup of Curling =

Grand Slam of Curling event

2011 GP Car and Home World Cup of Curling
- Host city: Sault Ste. Marie, Ontario
- Arena: Essar Centre
- Dates: November 2–6
- Winner: (Ontario) Glenn Howard
- Curling club: Coldwater & District CC, Coldwater
- Skip: Glenn Howard
- Third: Wayne Middaugh
- Second: Brent Laing
- Lead: Craig Savill
- Finalist: (Ontario) John Epping

The 2011 GP Car and Home World Cup of Curling was held from November 2 to 6 at the Essar Centre in Sault Ste. Marie, Ontario. It was the first Grand Slam event of the 2011–12 curling season and the eleventh time the tournament has been held. The purse for the event was CAD$100,000. Glenn Howard won his fifth World Cup of Curling and his ninth Grand Slam title overall after he and his team defeated John Epping in the final with a score of 6–4.

== Teams ==
Skip	Third	Second	Lead	Locale
Greg Balsdon	Chris Ciasnocha	Tyler Morgan	Jamie Farnell	Kingston, Ontario
Jim Cotter	Kevin Folk	Tyrel Griffith	Rick Sawatsky	Kelowna/Vernon, British Columbia
Niklas Edin	Sebastian Kraupp	Fredrik Lindberg	Viktor Kjäll	Karlstad, Sweden
John Epping	Scott Bailey	Scott Howard	David Mathers	Toronto, Ontario
David Nedohin (fourth)	Randy Ferbey (skip)	Ted Appelman	Brendan Melnyk	Edmonton, Alberta
Rob Fowler	Allan Lyburn	Richard Daneault	Derek Samagalski	Brandon, Manitoba
Brad Gushue	Ryan Fry	Geoff Walker	Adam Casey	St. John's, Newfoundland and Labrador
Glenn Howard	Wayne Middaugh	Brent Laing	Craig Savill	Coldwater, Ontario
Brad Jacobs	E. J. Harnden	Ryan Harnden	Scott Seabrook	Sault Ste. Marie, Ontario
Mark Kean	Andrew Clayton	Patrick Janssen	Tim March	Toronto, Ontario
Kevin Koe	Pat Simmons	Carter Rycroft	Nolan Thiessen	Edmonton, Alberta
Steve Laycock	Joel Jordison	Brennen Jones	Dallan Muyres	Saskatoon, Saskatchewan
Kevin Martin	John Morris	Marc Kennedy	Ben Hebert	Edmonton, Alberta
Dale Matchett	Ryan Werenich	Jeff Gorda	Shawn Kaufman	Bradford, Ontario
Mike McEwen	B. J. Neufeld	Matt Wozniak	Denni Neufeld	Winnipeg, Manitoba
Robert Schlender	Chris Lemishka	Darcy Hafso	Don Bartlett	Edmonton, Alberta
Jeff Stoughton	Jon Mead	Reid Carruthers	Steve Gould	Winnipeg, Manitoba
Thomas Ulsrud	Torger Nergård	Christoffer Svae	Håvard Vad Petersson	Oslo, Norway

== Round robin standings ==
Final Round Robin Standings

Key
Teams to Playoffs
Teams to Tiebreakers

Pool A	W	L
(Alberta) Kevin Martin	4	1
(Ontario) Greg Balsdon	3	2
(Sweden) Niklas Edin	3	2
(Alberta) Randy Ferbey	3	2
(Ontario) Dale Matchett	1	4
(Norway) Thomas Ulsrud	1	4

Pool B	W	L
(Newfoundland and Labrador) Brad Gushue	4	1
(Manitoba) Mike McEwen	4	1
(Alberta) Kevin Koe	3	2
(Manitoba) Rob Fowler	2	3
(Saskatchewan) Steve Laycock	1	4
(Alberta) Robert Schlender	1	4

Pool C	W	L
(Manitoba) Jeff Stoughton	5	0
(Ontario) Glenn Howard	4	1
(Ontario) John Epping	3	2
(Ontario) Brad Jacobs	2	3
(British Columbia) Jim Cotter	1	4
(Ontario) Mark Kean	0	5

== Round robin results ==
=== Draw 1 ===
Wednesday, November 2, 7:30 pm

Sheet A	1	2	3	4	5	6	7	8	Final
(Norway) Thomas Ulsrud	1	1	0	2	0	0	2	0	6
(Alberta) Randy Ferbey 🔨	0	0	1	0	2	2	0	2	7

Sheet B	1	2	3	4	5	6	7	8	Final
(Manitoba) Jeff Stoughton 🔨	2	0	2	0	0	2	0	X	6
(Ontario) Brad Jacobs	0	2	0	0	2	0	1	X	5

Sheet C	1	2	3	4	5	6	7	8	Final
(Manitoba) Mike McEwen 🔨	2	0	0	4	0	3	X	X	9
(Manitoba) Rob Fowler	0	0	1	0	1	0	X	X	2

Sheet D	1	2	3	4	5	6	7	8	Final
(Ontario) Glenn Howard 🔨	0	3	0	0	0	2	0	X	5
(British Columbia) Jim Cotter	1	0	0	0	1	0	1	X	3

Sheet E	1	2	3	4	5	6	7	8	Final
(Alberta) Kevin Koe	0	1	0	2	0	0	2	0	5
(Newfoundland and Labrador) Brad Gushue 🔨	1	0	2	0	2	1	0	1	7

=== Draw 2 ===
Thursday, November 3, 9:00 am

Sheet A	1	2	3	4	5	6	7	8	9	Final
(Ontario) Mark Kean	0	1	0	1	1	0	1	0	0	4
(Ontario) Brad Jacobs 🔨	1	0	1	0	0	1	0	1	1	5

Sheet B	1	2	3	4	5	6	7	8	9	Final
(Ontario) John Epping	0	1	1	0	0	2	2	0	1	7
(British Columbia) Jim Cotter 🔨	3	0	0	0	1	0	0	2	0	6

Sheet C	1	2	3	4	5	6	7	8	Final
(Saskatchewan) Steve Laycock	2	0	1	0	3	0	2	X	8
(Alberta) Robert Schlender 🔨	0	1	0	1	0	1	0	X	3

Sheet D	1	2	3	4	5	6	7	8	Final
(Sweden) Niklas Edin 🔨	0	1	0	3	1	1	0	1	7
(Ontario) Dale Matchett	1	0	1	0	0	0	2	0	4

Sheet E	1	2	3	4	5	6	7	8	Final
(Alberta) Kevin Martin	0	1	1	0	1	0	4	X	7
(Ontario) Greg Balsdon 🔨	1	0	0	1	0	2	0	X	4

=== Draw 3 ===
Thursday, November 3, 12:30 pm

Sheet A	1	2	3	4	5	6	7	8	Final
(Saskatchewan) Steve Laycock 🔨	0	0	2	0	2	0	0	0	4
(Newfoundland and Labrador) Brad Gushue	0	0	0	1	0	2	1	1	5

Sheet B	1	2	3	4	5	6	7	8	Final
(Manitoba) Mike McEwen	0	0	2	0	0	1	2	1	6
(Alberta) Kevin Koe 🔨	1	1	0	2	0	0	0	0	4

Sheet C	1	2	3	4	5	6	7	8	9	Final
(Manitoba) Jeff Stoughton 🔨	1	0	1	0	2	0	0	0	1	5
(Ontario) Mark Kean	0	0	0	2	0	1	0	1	0	4

Sheet D	1	2	3	4	5	6	7	8	Final
(Manitoba) Rob Fowler 🔨	0	1	0	2	0	3	0	X	6
(Alberta) Robert Schlender	0	0	1	0	2	0	1	X	4

Sheet E	1	2	3	4	5	6	7	8	Final
(Ontario) Glenn Howard	0	0	2	1	0	2	0	2	7
(Ontario) John Epping 🔨	1	0	0	0	1	0	1	0	3

=== Draw 4 ===
Thursday, November 3, 4:00 pm

Sheet A	1	2	3	4	5	6	7	8	Final
(Alberta) Kevin Koe 🔨	2	0	1	0	2	0	1	X	6
(Manitoba) Rob Fowler	0	1	0	1	0	1	0	X	3

Sheet B	1	2	3	4	5	6	7	8	Final
(Alberta) Kevin Martin 🔨	0	2	0	2	0	3	0	X	7
(Alberta) Randy Ferbey	0	0	2	0	1	0	0	X	3

Sheet C	1	2	3	4	5	6	7	8	Final
(Sweden) Niklas Edin	1	0	1	0	0	2	0	X	4
(Ontario) Greg Balsdon 🔨	0	2	0	2	1	0	3	X	8

Sheet D	1	2	3	4	5	6	7	8	Final
(Manitoba) Mike McEwen 🔨	0	2	0	0	1	0	0	4	7
(Newfoundland and Labrador) Brad Gushue	1	0	0	1	0	2	0	0	4

Sheet E	1	2	3	4	5	6	7	8	9	Final
(Norway) Thomas Ulsrud 🔨	2	0	0	1	0	1	1	0	1	6
(Ontario) Dale Matchett	0	0	2	0	2	0	0	1	0	5

=== Draw 5 ===
Thursday, November 3, 7:30 pm

Sheet A	1	2	3	4	5	6	7	8	Final
(Alberta) Kevin Martin 🔨	2	0	1	1	0	2	0	X	6
(Norway) Thomas Ulsrud	0	1	0	0	0	0	1	X	2

Sheet B	1	2	3	4	5	6	7	8	Final
(Manitoba) Jeff Stoughton 🔨	0	3	0	2	2	0	1	X	8
(Ontario) Glenn Howard	2	0	2	0	0	1	0	X	5

Sheet C	1	2	3	4	5	6	7	8	9	Final
(Ontario) Brad Jacobs 🔨	0	0	1	0	1	0	3	0	1	6
(British Columbia) Jim Cotter	0	0	0	2	0	1	0	2	0	5

Sheet D	1	2	3	4	5	6	7	8	Final
(Ontario) John Epping 🔨	1	0	3	0	3	X	X	X	7
(Ontario) Mark Kean	0	1	0	1	0	X	X	X	2

Sheet E	1	2	3	4	5	6	7	8	Final
(Ontario) Greg Balsdon 🔨	1	0	3	0	1	0	1	0	6
(Alberta) Randy Ferbey	0	1	0	2	0	1	0	3	7

=== Draw 6 ===
Friday, November 4, 9:00 am

Sheet A	1	2	3	4	5	6	7	8	Final
(Newfoundland and Labrador) Brad Gushue 🔨	2	1	0	2	1	0	0	X	6
(Alberta) Robert Schlender	0	0	2	0	0	1	1	X	4

Sheet B	1	2	3	4	5	6	7	8	Final
(Ontario) Dale Matchett	0	0	0	1	0	2	0	X	3
(Ontario) Greg Balsdon 🔨	2	1	0	0	3	0	2	X	8

Sheet C	1	2	3	4	5	6	7	8	Final
(Manitoba) Jeff Stoughton 🔨	0	3	0	1	0	1	0	1	6
(Ontario) John Epping	1	0	0	0	1	0	1	0	3

Sheet D	1	2	3	4	5	6	7	8	Final
(Sweden) Niklas Edin	0	4	0	1	0	1	X	X	6
(Alberta) Randy Ferbey 🔨	2	0	2	0	5	0	X	X	9

Sheet E	1	2	3	4	5	6	7	8	9	Final
(Manitoba) Rob Fowler 🔨	1	0	0	1	1	0	2	0	1	6
(Saskatchewan) Steve Laycock	0	2	0	0	0	1	0	2	0	5

=== Draw 7 ===
Friday, November 4, 12:30 pm

Sheet A	1	2	3	4	5	6	7	8	Final
(Manitoba) Mike McEwen 🔨	2	2	0	2	0	1	X	X	7
(Saskatchewan) Steve Laycock	0	0	1	0	1	0	X	X	2

Sheet B	1	2	3	4	5	6	7	8	Final
(Sweden) Niklas Edin	1	0	1	0	0	2	1	2	7
(Norway) Thomas Ulsrud 🔨	0	2	0	0	2	0	0	0	4

Sheet C	1	2	3	4	5	6	7	8	Final
(Alberta) Kevin Koe	2	1	0	2	1	X	X	X	6
(Alberta) Robert Schlender 🔨	0	0	1	0	0	X	X	X	1

Sheet D	1	2	3	4	5	6	7	8	Final
(Alberta) Kevin Martin	0	2	0	0	0	0	2	X	4
(Ontario) Dale Matchett 🔨	0	0	0	0	1	0	0	X	1

Sheet E	1	2	3	4	5	6	7	8	Final
(British Columbia) Jim Cotter 🔨	1	0	3	0	2	0	0	0	6
(Ontario) Mark Kean	0	2	0	1	0	1	0	1	5

=== Draw 8 ===
Friday, November 4, 4:00 pm

Sheet A	1	2	3	4	5	6	7	8	Final
(Manitoba) Jeff Stoughton 🔨	1	0	0	2	2	0	1	X	6
(British Columbia) Jim Cotter	0	0	1	0	0	1	0	X	2

Sheet B	1	2	3	4	5	6	7	8	Final
(Manitoba) Rob Fowler 🔨	2	0	0	0	0	2	0	0	4
(Newfoundland and Labrador) Brad Gushue	0	2	1	0	1	0	0	1	5

Sheet C	1	2	3	4	5	6	7	8	Final
(Ontario) Glenn Howard	0	1	0	0	1	1	2	X	5
(Ontario) Mark Kean 🔨	0	0	0	1	0	0	0	X	1

Sheet D	1	2	3	4	5	6	7	8	Final
(Norway) Thomas Ulsrud 🔨	1	0	2	0	0	0	1	0	4
(Ontario) Greg Balsdon	0	3	0	2	1	0	0	1	7

Sheet E	1	2	3	4	5	6	7	8	Final
(Ontario) John Epping	0	0	2	0	2	0	1	X	5
(Ontario) Brad Jacobs 🔨	0	1	0	1	0	1	0	X	3

=== Draw 9 ===
Friday, November 4, 7:30 pm

Sheet A	1	2	3	4	5	6	7	8	9	Final
(Alberta) Kevin Martin 🔨	0	0	1	0	0	0	0	1	0	2
(Sweden) Niklas Edin	0	0	0	1	0	1	0	0	1	3

Sheet B	1	2	3	4	5	6	7	8	Final
(Ontario) Glenn Howard 🔨	1	0	0	0	1	0	0	1	3
(Ontario) Brad Jacobs	0	0	0	0	0	2	0	0	2

Sheet C	1	2	3	4	5	6	7	8	Final
(Ontario) Dale Matchett 🔨	2	1	0	1	0	0	0	1	5
(Alberta) Randy Ferbey	0	0	2	0	2	0	0	0	4

Sheet D	1	2	3	4	5	6	7	8	Final
(Alberta) Kevin Koe	0	2	0	0	3	0	1	X	6
(Saskatchewan) Steve Laycock 🔨	1	0	1	0	0	1	0	X	3

Sheet E	1	2	3	4	5	6	7	8	9	Final
(Manitoba) Mike McEwen	0	3	0	1	0	3	0	1	0	8
(Alberta) Robert Schlender 🔨	4	0	1	0	1	0	2	0	1	9

== Tiebreakers ==
Saturday, November 5, 8:30 am

Team	1	2	3	4	5	6	7	8	9	Final
(Alberta) Randy Ferbey 🔨	2	0	0	1	0	0	0	1	0	4
(Sweden) Niklas Edin	0	1	1	0	1	1	0	0	1	5

Team	1	2	3	4	5	6	7	8	Final
(Ontario) John Epping 🔨	1	0	0	2	0	0	2	1	6
(Ontario) Greg Balsdon	0	3	0	0	0	2	0	0	5

== Playoffs ==
Quarterfinals
(Manitoba) Jeff Stoughton	3
(Sweden) Niklas Edin	5
(Ontario) Glenn Howard	4
(Manitoba) Mike McEwen	2
(Newfoundland and Labrador) Brad Gushue	4
(Ontario) John Epping	7
(Alberta) Kevin Martin	8
(Alberta) Kevin Koe	3

Semifinals
(Sweden) Niklas Edin	2
(Ontario) Glenn Howard	5
(Ontario) John Epping	4
(Alberta) Kevin Martin	3

Final
(Ontario) Glenn Howard	6
(Ontario) John Epping	4

=== Quarterfinals ===
Saturday, November 5, 12:00 pm

Team	1	2	3	4	5	6	7	8	Final
(Manitoba) Jeff Stoughton 🔨	0	0	0	1	0	2	0	X	3
(Sweden) Niklas Edin	0	1	1	0	1	0	2	X	5

Team	1	2	3	4	5	6	7	8	Final
(Ontario) Glenn Howard 🔨	1	1	0	0	0	1	0	1	4
(Manitoba) Mike McEwen	0	0	1	1	0	0	0	0	2

Team	1	2	3	4	5	6	7	8	Final
(Newfoundland and Labrador) Brad Gushue 🔨	0	0	2	0	0	2	0	X	4
(Ontario) John Epping	0	1	0	2	1	0	3	X	7

Team	1	2	3	4	5	6	7	8	Final
(Alberta) Kevin Martin 🔨	2	0	1	0	4	1	X	X	8
(Alberta) Kevin Koe	0	2	0	1	0	0	X	X	3

=== Semifinals ===
Saturday, November 5, 7:00 pm

Team	1	2	3	4	5	6	7	8	Final
(Sweden) Niklas Edin 🔨	0	2	0	0	0	0	0	X	2
(Ontario) Glenn Howard	2	0	1	0	1	1	0	X	5

Team	1	2	3	4	5	6	7	8	Final
(Ontario) John Epping	0	2	0	0	2	0	0	0	4
(Alberta) Kevin Martin 🔨	1	0	1	0	0	1	0	0	3

=== Final ===
Sunday, November 6, 1:00 pm

Team	1	2	3	4	5	6	7	8	Final
(Ontario) Glenn Howard 🔨	2	0	0	3	0	0	1	X	6
(Ontario) John Epping	0	2	0	0	2	0	0	X	4
