= 2013 Canadian Open of Curling =

Grand Slam of Curling event

- Host city: Medicine Hat, Alberta
- Arena: Medicine Hat Arena
- Dates: November 13–17
- Winner: (Alberta) Kevin Koe
- Curling club: Glencoe CC, Calgary
- Skip: Kevin Koe
- Third: Pat Simmons
- Second: Carter Rycroft
- Lead: Nolan Thiessen
- Finalist: (Newfoundland and Labrador) Brad Gushue

The 2013 Canadian Open of Curling was held from November 13 to 17 at Medicine Hat Arena in Medicine Hat, Alberta as part of the 2013–14 World Curling Tour. The event was the second men's Grand Slam event of the season. The event was held in a round robin format, and the purse for the event was CAD$100,000.

== Teams ==
The teams are listed as follows:

| Skip | Third | Second | Lead | Locale |
|---|---|---|---|---|
| Brendan Bottcher | Micky Lizmore | Bradley Thiessen | Karrick Martin | Edmonton, Alberta |
| Benoît Schwarz (fourth) | Peter de Cruz (skip) | Dominik Märki | Valentin Tanner | Geneva, Switzerland |
| Niklas Edin | Sebastian Kraupp | Fredrik Lindberg | Viktor Kjäll | Karlstad, Sweden |
| John Epping | Scott Bailey | Collin Mitchell | David Mathers | Toronto, Ontario |
| Oskar Eriksson | Kristian Lindström | Markus Eriksson | Christoffer Sundgren | Lit, Sweden |
| Rob Fowler | Allan Lyburn | Brendan Taylor | Derek Samagalski | Brandon, Manitoba |
| Brad Gushue | Brett Gallant | Adam Casey | Geoff Walker | St. John's, Newfoundland and Labrador |
| Glenn Howard | Wayne Middaugh | Brent Laing | Craig Savill | Penetanguishene, Ontario |
| Mark Kean | Travis Fanset | Patrick Janssen | Tim March | Toronto, Ontario |
| Kevin Koe | Pat Simmons | Carter Rycroft | Nolan Thiessen | Calgary, Alberta |
| Steve Laycock | Kirk Muyres | Colton Flasch | Dallan Muyres | Saskatoon, Saskatchewan |
| William Lyburn | Alex Forrest | Connor Njegovan | Tyler Forrest | Winnipeg, Manitoba |
| Kevin Martin | David Nedohin | Marc Kennedy | Ben Hebert | Edmonton, Alberta |
| Mike McEwen | B. J. Neufeld | Matt Wozniak | Denni Neufeld | Winnipeg, Manitoba |
| Jim Cotter (fourth) | John Morris (skip) | Tyrel Griffith | Rick Sawatsky | Vernon, British Columbia |
| Rob Rumfeldt | Adam Spencer | Scott Howard | Colin Hodgson | Guelph, Ontario |
| Jeff Stoughton | Jon Mead | Reid Carruthers | Mark Nichols | Winnipeg, Manitoba |
| Thomas Ulsrud | Torger Nergård | Christoffer Svae | Håvard Vad Petersson | Oslo, Norway |

== Round-robin standings ==
Final round-robin standings

Key
| Teams to Playoffs |
| Teams to Tiebreakers |

| Pool A | W | L |
|---|---|---|
| (Alberta) Kevin Martin | 4 | 1 |
| (Newfoundland and Labrador) Brad Gushue | 3 | 2 |
| (Manitoba) Jeff Stoughton | 3 | 2 |
| (Switzerland) Peter de Cruz | 3 | 2 |
| (Saskatchewan) Steve Laycock | 1 | 4 |
| (Manitoba) William Lyburn | 1 | 4 |

| Pool B | W | L |
|---|---|---|
| (Alberta) Kevin Koe | 4 | 1 |
| (Ontario) John Epping | 3 | 2 |
| (Manitoba) Mike McEwen | 3 | 2 |
| (British Columbia) John Morris | 2 | 3 |
| (Manitoba) Rob Fowler | 2 | 3 |
| (Alberta) Brendan Bottcher | 1 | 4 |

| Pool C | W | L |
|---|---|---|
| (Ontario) Glenn Howard | 4 | 1 |
| (Ontario) Mark Kean | 4 | 1 |
| (Ontario) Rob Rumfeldt | 3 | 2 |
| (Sweden) Niklas Edin | 2 | 3 |
| (Norway) Thomas Ulsrud | 1 | 4 |
| (Sweden) Oskar Eriksson | 1 | 4 |

== Round-robin results ==
All draw times are listed in Mountain Standard Time (UTC−7).

=== Draw 1 ===
Wednesday, November 13, 7:00 pm

| Sheet A | 1 | 2 | 3 | 4 | 5 | 6 | 7 | 8 | Final |
| (Manitoba) Jeff Stoughton 🔨 | 2 | 0 | 1 | 0 | 0 | 4 | 1 | X | 8 |
| (Saskatchewan) Steve Laycock | 0 | 1 | 0 | 2 | 0 | 0 | 0 | X | 3 |

| Sheet B | 1 | 2 | 3 | 4 | 5 | 6 | 7 | 8 | Final |
| (Alberta) Kevin Martin 🔨 | 1 | 0 | 1 | 0 | 3 | 1 | 0 | X | 6 |
| (Switzerland) Peter de Cruz | 0 | 1 | 0 | 1 | 0 | 0 | 1 | X | 3 |

| Sheet C | 1 | 2 | 3 | 4 | 5 | 6 | 7 | 8 | Final |
| (Alberta) Kevin Koe 🔨 | 0 | 1 | 1 | 0 | 0 | 1 | 0 | 2 | 5 |
| (Ontario) John Epping | 0 | 0 | 0 | 0 | 1 | 0 | 1 | 0 | 2 |

| Sheet D | 1 | 2 | 3 | 4 | 5 | 6 | 7 | 8 | Final |
| (Ontario) Glenn Howard | 0 | 1 | 1 | 0 | 0 | 1 | 1 | 0 | 4 |
| (Sweden) Oskar Eriksson 🔨 | 2 | 0 | 0 | 1 | 1 | 0 | 0 | 1 | 5 |

| Sheet E | 1 | 2 | 3 | 4 | 5 | 6 | 7 | 8 | Final |
| (Ontario) Mark Kean | 2 | 0 | 1 | 1 | 0 | 2 | 0 | X | 6 |
| (Norway) Thomas Ulsrud 🔨 | 0 | 0 | 0 | 0 | 1 | 0 | 2 | X | 3 |

=== Draw 2 ===
Thursday, November 14, 10:00 am

| Sheet A | 1 | 2 | 3 | 4 | 5 | 6 | 7 | 8 | Final |
| (Ontario) Mark Kean 🔨 | 0 | 2 | 1 | 0 | 2 | 0 | 1 | 1 | 7 |
| (Sweden) Niklas Edin | 1 | 0 | 0 | 2 | 0 | 1 | 0 | 0 | 4 |

| Sheet B | 1 | 2 | 3 | 4 | 5 | 6 | 7 | 8 | Final |
| (Ontario) Rob Rumfeldt 🔨 | 2 | 0 | 1 | 2 | 1 | 1 | X | X | 7 |
| (Sweden) Oskar Eriksson | 0 | 1 | 0 | 0 | 0 | 0 | X | X | 1 |

| Sheet C | 1 | 2 | 3 | 4 | 5 | 6 | 7 | 8 | Final |
| (British Columbia) John Morris 🔨 | 0 | 3 | 0 | 0 | 4 | 0 | 0 | X | 7 |
| (Manitoba) Rob Fowler | 0 | 0 | 2 | 1 | 0 | 0 | 1 | X | 4 |

| Sheet D | 1 | 2 | 3 | 4 | 5 | 6 | 7 | 8 | Final |
| (Manitoba) Mike McEwen 🔨 | 1 | 0 | 2 | 0 | 0 | 1 | 0 | 2 | 6 |
| (Alberta) Brendan Bottcher | 0 | 1 | 0 | 0 | 1 | 0 | 3 | 0 | 5 |

| Sheet E | 1 | 2 | 3 | 4 | 5 | 6 | 7 | 8 | Final |
| (Newfoundland and Labrador) Brad Gushue 🔨 | 0 | 0 | 2 | 0 | 1 | 2 | 1 | X | 6 |
| (Manitoba) William Lyburn | 0 | 0 | 0 | 2 | 0 | 0 | 0 | X | 2 |

=== Draw 3 ===
Thursday, November 14, 1:30 pm

| Sheet A | 1 | 2 | 3 | 4 | 5 | 6 | 7 | 8 | Final |
| (Alberta) Kevin Koe 🔨 | 1 | 0 | 2 | 0 | 2 | 0 | 3 | X | 8 |
| (Alberta) Brendan Bottcher | 0 | 1 | 0 | 2 | 0 | 1 | 0 | X | 4 |

| Sheet B | 1 | 2 | 3 | 4 | 5 | 6 | 7 | 8 | Final |
| (Ontario) Glenn Howard 🔨 | 0 | 0 | 1 | 2 | 1 | 0 | 1 | X | 5 |
| (Sweden) Niklas Edin | 0 | 0 | 0 | 0 | 0 | 1 | 0 | X | 1 |

| Sheet C | 1 | 2 | 3 | 4 | 5 | 6 | 7 | 8 | Final |
| (Manitoba) Jeff Stoughton | 1 | 0 | 2 | 0 | 2 | 0 | 0 | 1 | 6 |
| (Newfoundland and Labrador) Brad Gushue 🔨 | 0 | 1 | 0 | 1 | 0 | 3 | 0 | 0 | 5 |

| Sheet D | 1 | 2 | 3 | 4 | 5 | 6 | 7 | 8 | Final |
| (Norway) Thomas Ulsrud | 2 | 0 | 0 | 0 | 1 | 1 | 0 | X | 4 |
| (Ontario) Rob Rumfeldt 🔨 | 0 | 0 | 2 | 4 | 0 | 0 | 3 | X | 9 |

| Sheet E | 1 | 2 | 3 | 4 | 5 | 6 | 7 | 8 | Final |
| (British Columbia) John Morris | 0 | 3 | 0 | 0 | 2 | 0 | 2 | 0 | 7 |
| (Ontario) John Epping 🔨 | 2 | 0 | 2 | 2 | 0 | 1 | 0 | 3 | 10 |

=== Draw 4 ===
Thursday, November 14, 5:30 pm

| Sheet A | 1 | 2 | 3 | 4 | 5 | 6 | 7 | 8 | Final |
| (Sweden) Oskar Eriksson | 0 | 1 | 0 | 0 | 1 | X | X | X | 2 |
| (Norway) Thomas Ulsrud 🔨 | 5 | 0 | 0 | 1 | 0 | X | X | X | 6 |

| Sheet B | 1 | 2 | 3 | 4 | 5 | 6 | 7 | 8 | Final |
| (Manitoba) Mike McEwen | 0 | 1 | 0 | 0 | 0 | X | X | X | 1 |
| (Ontario) John Epping 🔨 | 3 | 0 | 2 | 0 | 2 | X | X | X | 7 |

| Sheet C | 1 | 2 | 3 | 4 | 5 | 6 | 7 | 8 | Final |
| (Ontario) Glenn Howard 🔨 | 3 | 0 | 2 | 0 | 0 | 0 | 3 | X | 8 |
| (Ontario) Mark Kean | 0 | 2 | 0 | 2 | 0 | 0 | 0 | X | 4 |

| Sheet D | 1 | 2 | 3 | 4 | 5 | 6 | 7 | 8 | Final |
| (Alberta) Kevin Martin 🔨 | 2 | 0 | 2 | 0 | 1 | 0 | 1 | 0 | 6 |
| (Manitoba) William Lyburn | 0 | 1 | 0 | 1 | 0 | 2 | 0 | 1 | 5 |

| Sheet E | 1 | 2 | 3 | 4 | 5 | 6 | 7 | 8 | Final |
| (Switzerland) Peter de Cruz 🔨 | 1 | 1 | 0 | 2 | 1 | 1 | X | X | 6 |
| (Saskatchewan) Steve Laycock | 0 | 0 | 1 | 0 | 0 | 0 | X | X | 1 |

=== Draw 5 ===
Thursday, November 14, 8:30 pm

| Sheet A | 1 | 2 | 3 | 4 | 5 | 6 | 7 | 8 | Final |
| (Alberta) Kevin Martin | 0 | 2 | 0 | 0 | 2 | 0 | 4 | 0 | 8 |
| (Saskatchewan) Steve Laycock 🔨 | 1 | 0 | 1 | 1 | 0 | 2 | 0 | 1 | 6 |

| Sheet B | 1 | 2 | 3 | 4 | 5 | 6 | 7 | 8 | Final |
| (Manitoba) Jeff Stoughton 🔨 | 3 | 0 | 0 | 0 | 2 | 0 | 3 | X | 8 |
| (Manitoba) William Lyburn | 0 | 0 | 0 | 2 | 0 | 2 | 0 | X | 4 |

| Sheet C | 1 | 2 | 3 | 4 | 5 | 6 | 7 | 8 | 9 | Final |
| (Manitoba) Mike McEwen | 0 | 2 | 0 | 1 | 0 | 1 | 0 | 1 | 0 | 5 |
| (Alberta) Kevin Koe 🔨 | 2 | 0 | 0 | 0 | 1 | 0 | 2 | 0 | 1 | 6 |

| Sheet D | 1 | 2 | 3 | 4 | 5 | 6 | 7 | 8 | Final |
| (Newfoundland and Labrador) Brad Gushue | 0 | 2 | 0 | 0 | 0 | 3 | 0 | 0 | 5 |
| (Switzerland) Peter de Cruz 🔨 | 2 | 0 | 0 | 2 | 1 | 0 | 2 | 1 | 8 |

| Sheet E | 1 | 2 | 3 | 4 | 5 | 6 | 7 | 8 | Final |
| (Alberta) Brendan Bottcher | 0 | 0 | 0 | 2 | 0 | 0 | 0 | 1 | 3 |
| (Manitoba) Rob Fowler 🔨 | 0 | 0 | 1 | 0 | 1 | 1 | 2 | 0 | 5 |

=== Draw 6 ===
Friday, November 15, 10:00am

| Sheet A | 1 | 2 | 3 | 4 | 5 | 6 | 7 | 8 | 9 | Final |
| (Alberta) Brendan Bottcher | 0 | 0 | 1 | 0 | 0 | 2 | 0 | 0 | 1 | 4 |
| (British Columbia) John Morris 🔨 | 0 | 0 | 0 | 1 | 1 | 0 | 0 | 1 | 0 | 3 |

| Sheet B | 1 | 2 | 3 | 4 | 5 | 6 | 7 | 8 | Final |
| (Manitoba) Rob Fowler | 0 | 1 | 0 | 0 | 0 | X | X | X | 1 |
| (Alberta) Kevin Koe 🔨 | 4 | 0 | 2 | 0 | 1 | X | X | X | 7 |

| Sheet C | 1 | 2 | 3 | 4 | 5 | 6 | 7 | 8 | Final |
| (Saskatchewan) Steve Laycock 🔨 | 0 | 2 | 0 | 1 | 0 | 4 | X | X | 7 |
| (Manitoba) William Lyburn | 0 | 0 | 1 | 0 | 0 | 0 | X | X | 1 |

| Sheet D | 1 | 2 | 3 | 4 | 5 | 6 | 7 | 8 | Final |
| (Sweden) Niklas Edin | 0 | 1 | 0 | 2 | 1 | 0 | 3 | X | 7 |
| (Sweden) Oskar Eriksson 🔨 | 1 | 0 | 1 | 0 | 0 | 1 | 0 | X | 3 |

| Sheet E | 1 | 2 | 3 | 4 | 5 | 6 | 7 | 8 | Final |
| (Ontario) Glenn Howard 🔨 | 2 | 0 | 1 | 0 | 0 | 0 | 2 | X | 5 |
| (Ontario) Rob Rumfeldt | 0 | 0 | 0 | 0 | 1 | 1 | 0 | X | 2 |

=== Draw 7 ===
Friday, November 15, 1:30 pm

| Sheet A | 1 | 2 | 3 | 4 | 5 | 6 | 7 | 8 | Final |
| (Ontario) Mark Kean | 0 | 1 | 0 | 2 | 1 | 0 | 4 | X | 8 |
| (Ontario) Rob Rumfeldt 🔨 | 1 | 0 | 1 | 0 | 0 | 2 | 0 | X | 4 |

| Sheet B | 1 | 2 | 3 | 4 | 5 | 6 | 7 | 8 | Final |
| (Manitoba) Jeff Stoughton | 0 | 0 | 2 | 0 | 2 | 0 | 1 | 0 | 5 |
| (Switzerland) Peter de Cruz 🔨 | 0 | 1 | 0 | 1 | 0 | 3 | 0 | 2 | 7 |

| Sheet C | 1 | 2 | 3 | 4 | 5 | 6 | 7 | 8 | Final |
| (Ontario) Glenn Howard 🔨 | 0 | 0 | 1 | 4 | 0 | 0 | 0 | 2 | 7 |
| (Norway) Thomas Ulsrud | 1 | 0 | 0 | 0 | 0 | 2 | 2 | 0 | 5 |

| Sheet D | 1 | 2 | 3 | 4 | 5 | 6 | 7 | 8 | Final |
| (Manitoba) Mike McEwen 🔨 | 3 | 0 | 0 | 3 | 0 | 2 | 0 | 1 | 9 |
| (British Columbia) John Morris | 0 | 3 | 3 | 0 | 0 | 0 | 0 | 0 | 6 |

| Sheet E | 1 | 2 | 3 | 4 | 5 | 6 | 7 | 8 | Final |
| (Ontario) John Epping | 0 | 3 | 0 | 2 | 0 | 0 | 2 | X | 7 |
| (Alberta) Brendan Bottcher 🔨 | 2 | 0 | 1 | 0 | 1 | 0 | 0 | X | 4 |

=== Draw 8 ===
Friday, November 15, 5:00 pm

| Sheet A | 1 | 2 | 3 | 4 | 5 | 6 | 7 | 8 | Final |
| (Switzerland) Peter de Cruz | 1 | 0 | 1 | 0 | 1 | 0 | 0 | X | 3 |
| (Manitoba) William Lyburn 🔨 | 0 | 3 | 0 | 1 | 0 | 0 | 3 | X | 7 |

| Sheet B | 1 | 2 | 3 | 4 | 5 | 6 | 7 | 8 | 9 | Final |
| (Sweden) Niklas Edin | 0 | 1 | 1 | 0 | 0 | 1 | 0 | 0 | 1 | 4 |
| (Norway) Thomas Ulsrud 🔨 | 1 | 0 | 0 | 1 | 0 | 0 | 0 | 1 | 0 | 3 |

| Sheet C | 1 | 2 | 3 | 4 | 5 | 6 | 7 | 8 | 9 | Final |
| (Alberta) Kevin Martin 🔨 | 1 | 0 | 0 | 1 | 0 | 2 | 0 | 2 | 0 | 6 |
| (Newfoundland and Labrador) Brad Gushue | 0 | 1 | 1 | 0 | 2 | 0 | 2 | 0 | 1 | 7 |

| Sheet D | 1 | 2 | 3 | 4 | 5 | 6 | 7 | 8 | Final |
| (Manitoba) Rob Fowler 🔨 | 0 | 4 | 1 | 0 | 3 | X | X | X | 7 |
| (Ontario) John Epping | 1 | 0 | 0 | 2 | 0 | X | X | X | 3 |

| Sheet E | 1 | 2 | 3 | 4 | 5 | 6 | 7 | 8 | Final |
| (Sweden) Oskar Eriksson | 0 | 0 | 2 | 1 | 0 | 1 | 0 | X | 4 |
| (Ontario) Mark Kean 🔨 | 3 | 1 | 0 | 0 | 1 | 0 | 3 | X | 8 |

=== Draw 9 ===
Friday, November 15, 8:30 pm

| Sheet A | 1 | 2 | 3 | 4 | 5 | 6 | 7 | 8 | Final |
| (Manitoba) Rob Fowler | 0 | 1 | 0 | 0 | 0 | 1 | X | X | 2 |
| (Manitoba) Mike McEwen 🔨 | 3 | 0 | 3 | 0 | 0 | 0 | X | X | 6 |

| Sheet B | 1 | 2 | 3 | 4 | 5 | 6 | 7 | 8 | Final |
| (Newfoundland and Labrador) Brad Gushue | 0 | 2 | 0 | 2 | 0 | 3 | 2 | X | 9 |
| (Saskatchewan) Steve Laycock 🔨 | 1 | 0 | 1 | 0 | 2 | 0 | 0 | X | 4 |

| Sheet C | 1 | 2 | 3 | 4 | 5 | 6 | 7 | 8 | Final |
| (British Columbia) John Morris | 0 | 2 | 0 | 2 | 0 | 0 | 1 | X | 5 |
| (Alberta) Kevin Koe 🔨 | 1 | 0 | 2 | 0 | 0 | 0 | 0 | X | 3 |

| Sheet D | 1 | 2 | 3 | 4 | 5 | 6 | 7 | 8 | Final |
| (Manitoba) Jeff Stoughton 🔨 | 1 | 0 | 0 | 1 | 0 | X | X | X | 2 |
| (Alberta) Kevin Martin | 0 | 2 | 2 | 0 | 4 | X | X | X | 8 |

| Sheet E | 1 | 2 | 3 | 4 | 5 | 6 | 7 | 8 | Final |
| (Sweden) Niklas Edin | 0 | 0 | 0 | 1 | 0 | X | X | X | 1 |
| (Ontario) Rob Rumfeldt 🔨 | 1 | 1 | 4 | 0 | 2 | X | X | X | 8 |

== Tiebreakers ==
Saturday, November 16, 10:00 am

| Team | 1 | 2 | 3 | 4 | 5 | 6 | 7 | 8 | 9 | Final |
| (Manitoba) Jeff Stoughton | 0 | 2 | 0 | 0 | 1 | 0 | 1 | 0 | 2 | 6 |
| (Switzerland) Peter de Cruz 🔨 | 1 | 0 | 1 | 0 | 0 | 1 | 0 | 1 | 0 | 4 |

Player percentages
| (Manitoba) Jeff Stoughton | | (Switzerland) Peter de Cruz | |
|---|---|---|---|
| Mark Nichols | 91% | Valentin Tanner | 91% |
| Reid Carruthers | 89% | Dominik Märki | 86% |
| Jon Mead | 86% | Peter de Cruz | 85% |
| Jeff Stoughton | 92% | Benoît Schwarz | 83% |
| Total | 89% | Total | 86% |

| Team | 1 | 2 | 3 | 4 | 5 | 6 | 7 | 8 | 9 | Final |
| (Manitoba) Mike McEwen | 0 | 0 | 0 | 2 | 0 | 2 | 0 | 2 | 0 | 6 |
| (Ontario) Rob Rumfeldt 🔨 | 0 | 2 | 1 | 0 | 1 | 0 | 2 | 0 | 1 | 7 |

Player percentages
| (Manitoba) Mike McEwen | | (Ontario) Rob Rumfeldt | |
|---|---|---|---|
| Denni Neufeld | 84% | Colin Hodgson | 94% |
| Matt Wozniak | 94% | Scott Howard | 85% |
| B. J. Neufeld | 96% | Adam Spencer | 85% |
| Mike McEwen | 75% | Rob Rumfeldt | 80% |
| Total | 87% | Total | 86% |

== Playoffs ==
Quarterfinals
(Alberta) Kevin Koe | 7
(Ontario) Rob Rumfeldt | 4
(Ontario) Glenn Howard | 6
(Ontario) John Epping | 3
(Ontario) Mark Kean | 5
(Manitoba) Jeff Stoughton | 6
(Alberta) Kevin Martin | 4
(Newfoundland and Labrador) Brad Gushue | 7

Semifinals
(Alberta) Kevin Koe | 4
(Ontario) Glenn Howard | 3
(Manitoba) Jeff Stoughton | 2
(Newfoundland and Labrador) Brad Gushue | 4

Final
(Alberta) Kevin Koe | 5
(Newfoundland and Labrador) Brad Gushue | 4

=== Quarterfinals ===
Saturday, November 16, 10:00 am

| Team | 1 | 2 | 3 | 4 | 5 | 6 | 7 | 8 | Final |
| (Ontario) Glenn Howard 🔨 | 1 | 0 | 0 | 0 | 3 | 1 | 0 | 1 | 6 |
| (Ontario) John Epping | 0 | 1 | 0 | 0 | 0 | 0 | 2 | 0 | 3 |

Player percentages
| (Ontario) Glenn Howard | | (Ontario) John Epping | |
|---|---|---|---|
| Craig Savill | 85% | David Mathers | 96% |
| Brent Laing | 96% | Collin Mitchell | 86% |
| Wayne Middaugh | 95% | Scott Bailey | 97% |
| Glenn Howard | 95% | John Epping | 86% |
| Total | 93% | Total | 91% |

| Team | 1 | 2 | 3 | 4 | 5 | 6 | 7 | 8 | Final |
| (Alberta) Kevin Martin 🔨 | 1 | 0 | 1 | 0 | 0 | 2 | 0 | 0 | 4 |
| (Newfoundland and Labrador) Brad Gushue | 0 | 1 | 0 | 1 | 1 | 0 | 0 | 4 | 7 |

Player percentages
| (Alberta) Kevin Martin | | (Newfoundland and Labrador) Brad Gushue | |
|---|---|---|---|
| Ben Hebert | 86% | Geoff Walker | 90% |
| Marc Kennedy | 82% | Adam Casey | 82% |
| David Nedohin | 85% | Brett Gallant | 88% |
| Kevin Martin | 86% | Brad Gushue | 95% |
| Total | 85% | Total | 89% |

Saturday, November 16, 3:00 pm

| Team | 1 | 2 | 3 | 4 | 5 | 6 | 7 | 8 | Final |
| (Alberta) Kevin Koe 🔨 | 1 | 0 | 3 | 0 | 0 | 0 | 3 | X | 7 |
| (Ontario) Rob Rumfeldt | 0 | 1 | 0 | 1 | 1 | 1 | 0 | X | 4 |

Player percentages
| (Alberta) Kevin Koe | | (Ontario) Rob Rumfeldt | |
|---|---|---|---|
| Nolan Thiessen | 77% | Colin Hodgson | 94% |
| Carter Rycroft | 95% | Scott Howard | 81% |
| Pat Simmons | 89% | Adam Spencer | 85% |
| Kevin Koe | 80% | Rob Rumfeldt | 78% |
| Total | 86% | Total | 85% |

| Team | 1 | 2 | 3 | 4 | 5 | 6 | 7 | 8 | Final |
| (Ontario) Mark Kean 🔨 | 2 | 0 | 0 | 2 | 0 | 0 | 0 | 1 | 5 |
| (Manitoba) Jeff Stoughton | 0 | 2 | 0 | 0 | 2 | 1 | 1 | 0 | 6 |

Player percentages
| (Ontario) Mark Kean | | (Manitoba) Jeff Stoughton | |
|---|---|---|---|
| Tim March | 75% | Mark Nichols | 88% |
| Patrick Janssen | 78% | Reid Carruthers | 75% |
| Travis Fanset | 86% | Jon Mead | 96% |
| Mark Kean | 69% | Jeff Stoughton | 92% |
| Total | 77% | Total | 88% |

=== Semifinals ===
Saturday, November 16, 6:30pm

| Team | 1 | 2 | 3 | 4 | 5 | 6 | 7 | 8 | 9 | Final |
| (Alberta) Kevin Koe 🔨 | 2 | 0 | 0 | 0 | 0 | 1 | 0 | 0 | 1 | 4 |
| (Ontario) Glenn Howard | 0 | 0 | 0 | 0 | 1 | 0 | 0 | 2 | 0 | 3 |

Player percentages
| (Alberta) Kevin Koe | | (Ontario) Glenn Howard | |
|---|---|---|---|
| Nolan Thiessen | 83% | Craig Savill | 95% |
| Carter Rycroft | 80% | Brent Laing | 79% |
| Pat Simmons | 92% | Wayne Middaugh | 92% |
| Kevin Koe | 85% | Glenn Howard | 84% |
| Total | 85% | Total | 87% |

| Team | 1 | 2 | 3 | 4 | 5 | 6 | 7 | 8 | Final |
| (Manitoba) Jeff Stoughton 🔨 | 0 | 0 | 0 | 1 | 0 | 0 | 1 | 0 | 2 |
| (Newfoundland and Labrador) Brad Gushue | 1 | 0 | 1 | 0 | 1 | 0 | 0 | 1 | 4 |

Player percentages
| (Manitoba) Jeff Stoughton | | (Newfoundland and Labrador) Brad Gushue | |
|---|---|---|---|
| Mark Nichols | 85% | Geoff Walker | 92% |
| Reid Carruthers | 72% | Adam Casey | 97% |
| Jon Mead | 90% | Brett Gallant | 84% |
| Jeff Stoughton | 73% | Brad Gushue | 95% |
| Total | 80% | Total | 92% |

=== Final ===
Sunday, November 17, 11:00am

| Team | 1 | 2 | 3 | 4 | 5 | 6 | 7 | 8 | Final |
| (Alberta) Kevin Koe 🔨 | 2 | 0 | 0 | 0 | 0 | 2 | 0 | 1 | 5 |
| (Newfoundland and Labrador) Brad Gushue | 0 | 0 | 2 | 1 | 0 | 0 | 1 | 0 | 4 |

Player percentages
| (Alberta) Kevin Koe | | (Newfoundland and Labrador) Brad Gushue | |
|---|---|---|---|
| Nolan Thiessen | 92% | Geoff Walker | 93% |
| Carter Rycroft | 94% | Adam Casey | 96% |
| Pat Simmons | 91% | Brett Gallant | 84% |
| Kevin Koe | 85% | Brad Gushue | 79% |
| Total | 90% | Total | 88% |
