= 2009 World Cup of Curling =

Grand Slam of Curling event

2009 Grey Power World Cup of Curling
- Host city: Mississauga, Ontario
- Arena: Hershey Centre
- Dates: October 21–25
- Attendance: 41,701
- Winner: (Canada) Team Howard
- Curling club: Coldwater & District CC, Coldwater, Ontario
- Skip: Glenn Howard
- Third: Richard Hart
- Second: Brent Laing
- Lead: Craig Savill
- Finalist: (Canada) Team Koe

The 2009 Grey Power World Cup of Curling was held October 21–25 at the Hershey Centre in Mississauga, Ontario.

The 2009 World Cup was the first Grand Slam event of the 2009-10 curling season. It was the first Grand Slam to be held in the Greater Toronto Area.

This event is normally known as the Masters of Curling, but in 2009 it was changed to the World Cup of Curling . The 2009 event had a majority of its teams from outside of Canada. The event featured one team from every country that sent a team to the men's Olympic event, except Canada, which had five teams (the four teams that had already qualified for the 2009 Canadian Olympic Curling Trials plus defending Olympic champions, team Brad Gushue.

The total purse of the event was $100,000, with the Howard rink winning $24,000 of that.

For the third event in a row, Howard faced off against Koe in the final. Howard defended his previous three titles by winning his fourth straight event, and his eighth Grand Slam title. Koe has yet to win a title, having now lost six Grand Slam finals.

== Three Nations Cup ==
In addition to the World Cup, which is a men's event, a women's "Three Nations Cup" was held. This small event featured teams Shannon Kleibrink and Stefanie Lawton of Canada as well as Wang Bingyu of China and Eve Muirhead of Great Britain. Many of the top women's teams however could not participate, as they were playing in the 2009 Manitoba Lotteries Women's Curling Classic. The event was a round robin event, which was won by Great Britain's Eve Muirhead.

Team	W	L	PF	PA
(United Kingdom) Muirhead	3	1	25	14
(Canada) Lawton	2	2	23	23
(China) Wang	2	2	20	25
(Canada) Kleibrink	1	3	20	36

== World Cup teams ==
Skip	Third	Second	Lead	Home city
Thomas Dufour	Tony Angiboust	Richard Ducroz	Jan Henri Ducroz	(France) Chamonix
Niklas Edin	Sebastian Kraupp	Fredrik Lindberg	Viktor Kjäll	(Sweden) Karlstad
David Nedohin (fourth)	Randy Ferbey (skip)	Scott Pfeifer	Marcel Rocque	(Canada) Edmonton
Brad Gushue	Mark Nichols	Ryan Fry	Jamie Korab	(Canada) St. John's
Glenn Howard	Richard Hart	Brent Laing	Craig Savill	(Canada) Coldwater
Andy Kapp	Andreas Lang	Holger Höhne	Andreas Kempf	(Germany) Füssen
Kevin Koe	Blake MacDonald	Carter Rycroft	Nolan Thiessen	(Canada) Edmonton
Wang Fengchun (fourth)	Liu Rui (skip)	Xu Xiaoming	Li Hongchen	(China) Harbin
Kevin Martin	John Morris	Marc Kennedy	Ben Hebert	(Canada) Edmonton
David Murdoch	Ewan MacDonald	Peter Smith	Euan Byers	(United Kingdom) Lockerbie
Johnny Frederiksen (fourth)	Ulrik Schmidt (skip)	Bo Jensen	Lars Vilandt	(Denmark) Copenhagen
John Shuster	Jason Smith	Jeff Isaacson	John Benton	(United States) Duluth
Ralph Stöckli	Jan Hauser	Simon Strübin	Markus Eggler	(Switzerland) Basel
Thomas Ulsrud	Torger Nergård	Christoffer Svae	Havard Vad Petersson	(Norway) Oslo

== Draw ==
=== Pool A ===
Team	W	L	PF	PA
(Canada) Martin	6	0	43	20
(Norway) Ulsrud	4	2	33	22
(Canada) Koe	4	2	38	35
(Sweden) Edin	4	2	29	33
(Canada) Ferbey	2	4	26	34
(China) Wang	1	5	24	32
(France) Dufour	0	6	22	38

Scores:

- Martin 9-1 Edin
- Ferbey 4-2 Wang
- Koe 7-4 Dufour
- Martin 6-3 Dufour
- Ulsrud 8-2 Edin
- Koe 6-4 Ulsrud
- Edin 8-3 Ferbey
- Martin 8-4 Wang
- Wang 8-5 Dufour
- Koe 7-6 Ferbey (9)
- Edin 5-3 Dufour
- Martin 5-4 Ulsrud (9)
- Koe 6-4 Wang
- Ulsrud 7-4 Ferbey
- Martin 9-5 Koe
- Ferbey 6-4 Dufour
- Edin 5-4 Wang (9)
- Ulsrud 6-3 Dufour
- Martin 6-3 Ferbey
- Ulsrud 4-2 Wang
- Edin 8-6 Koe

=== Pool B ===
Team	W	L	PF	PA
(Canada) Howard	6	0	44	22
(Denmark) Schmidt	4	2	34	34
(Germany) Kapp	3	3	30	23
(Canada) Gushue	3	3	26	26
(United States) Shuster	2	4	21	31
(Switzerland) Stöckli	2	4	31	32
(United Kingdom) Murdoch	1	5	20	38

Scores:

- Howard 9-5 Kapp
- Shuster 4-3 Gushue
- Kapp 7–1 Gushue
- Stöckli 8-4 Murdoch
- Howard 9-3 Schmidt
- Kapp 8–0 Shuster
- Gushue 6-5 Stöckli (9)
- Schmidt 5-3 Shuster
- Howard 8-3 Murdoch
- Howard 4-1 Gushue
- Stöckli 4-1 Kapp
- Schmidt 8-3 Murdoch
- Schmidt 6-5 Kapp (9)
- Shuster 5-4 Stöckli
- Gushue 6-2 Murdoch
- Howard 6-5 Shuster (9)
- Howard 8-5 Stöckli
- Kapp 4–3 Murdoch
- Gushue 9-4 Schmidt
- Schmidt 8-5 Stöckli
- Murdoch 5-4 Shuster

=== Playoffs ===
Quarterfinals
(Canada) Martin	2
(Canada) Gushue	8
(Canada) Koe	7
(Sweden) Edin	2
(Canada) Howard	8
(Germany) Kapp	5
(Norway) Ulsrud	8
(Denmark) Schmidt	2

Semifinals
(Canada) Gushue	4
(Canada) Koe	6
(Canada) Howard	5
(Norway) Ulsrud	4

Finals
(Canada) Koe	4
(Canada) Howard	6
