= 2006 Masters of Curling (February) =

Grand Slam of Curling event

The February 2006 Masters of Curling men's Grand Slam curling tournament was held February 23 to 26, 2006 at the Mile One Centre in St. John's, Newfoundland and Labrador.

The total purse for the event was $100,000. The tournament format was a triple knock out with an 8 team playoff.

Randy Ferbey and his team of David Nedohin, Scott Pfeifer and Marcel Rocque of Edmonton defeated their same-city rivals Team Kevin Martin in the final to pick up the top prize of $30,000. It was Ferbey's first Slam win. Ferbey won the game 6–3. Martin blamed his team's loss as having too many of his rocks pick. Ferbey defeated Glenn Howard 9–6 and Martin defeated Shawn Adams 8–5 in the semifinals. In the quarterfinals, Ferbey beat Vic Peters 9–3 and Martin beat Wayne Middaugh 5–3.

Sportsnet carried the semifinals and finals on television.

The event was overshadowed by the final of curling event at the 2006 Winter Olympics, which was held on the same weekend, and featured the hometown Brad Gushue rink. That, and a snow storm in St. John's, kept many would-be spectators at home.

== Teams ==
The teams were as follows:

Skip	Third	Second	Lead	Locale
Shawn Adams	Paul Flemming	Craig Burgess	Kelly Mittelstadt	Halifax, Nova Scotia
Martin Ferland	Don Westphal	Philippe Lemay	Marco Berthelot	Buckingham, Quebec
Mark Dacey	Bruce Lohnes	Rob Harris	Andrew Gibson	Halifax, Nova Scotia
David Nedohin	Randy Ferbey (skip)	Scott Pfeifer	Marcel Rocque	Edmonton, Alberta
Graham Freeman	Scott Ramsay	Cory Barkley	Dwayne Barkley	Virden, Manitoba
Ryan Fry	Mike McEwen	Ross McFadyen	Cory Naharnie	Winnipeg, Manitoba
Sean Geall	Mark Olson	Chad Hofmann	Robert Hockley	White Rock, British Columbia
Glenn Howard	Richard Hart	Brent Laing	Craig Savill	Coldwater, Ontario
Steve Laycock	Darren Moulding	Mike Jantzen	Chris Schille	Saskatoon, Saskatchewan
Kevin Martin	Don Walchuk	Carter Rycroft	Don Bartlett	Edmonton, Alberta
Wayne Middaugh	Peter Corner	Phil Loevenmark	Scott Bailey	Toronto, Ontario
John Morris	Kevin Koe	Marc Kennedy	Paul Moffatt	Calgary, Alberta
Mark Noseworthy	Rick Rowsell	Brent Hamilton	David Noftall	St. John's, Newfoundland and Labrador
Vic Peters	Daley Peters	Chris Neufeld	Denni Neufeld	Winnipeg, Manitoba
Pat Simmons	Jeff Sharp	Chris Haichert	Ben Hebert	Saskatoon, Saskatchewan
Jeff Stoughton	Jon Mead	Garry Vandenberghe	Steve Gould	Winnipeg, Manitoba

== Prize money ==
Rank	Team	Prize (CA$)
1	(Alberta) Randy Ferbey	$30,000
2	(Alberta) Kevin Martin	$18,000
3	(Ontario) Glenn Howard	$12,000
3	(Nova Scotia) Shawn Adams	$12,000
5	(Manitoba) Jeff Stoughton	$7,000
5	(Alberta) John Morris	$7,000
5	(Ontario) Wayne Middaugh	$7,000
5	(Manitoba) Vic Peters	$7,000

== Playoffs ==
The playoff scores were as follows:

Quarterfinals
(Alberta) John Morris	5
(Ontario) Glenn Howard	6
(Alberta) Randy Ferbey	9
(Manitoba) Vic Peters	3
(Manitoba) Jeff Stoughton	6
(Nova Scotia) Shawn Adams	7
(Alberta) Kevin Martin	5
(Ontario) Wayne Middaugh	3

Semifinals
(Ontario) Glenn Howard	6
(Alberta) Randy Ferbey	9
(Nova Scotia) Shawn Adams	5
(Alberta) Kevin Martin	8

Finals
(Alberta) Randy Ferbey	6
(Alberta) Kevin Martin	3

== Final ==
Sheet C	1	2	3	4	5	6	7	8	9	10	Final
(Alberta) Randy Ferbey 🔨	2	1	0	0	2	0	0	0	1	X	6
(Alberta) Kevin Martin	0	0	0	1	0	2	0	0	0	X	3
