= 2006 Masters of Curling (December) =

Grand Slam of Curling event

2006 Home Hardware Masters of Curling
- Host city: Waterloo, Ontario
- Arena: Waterloo Memorial Recreation Complex
- Dates: November 29 – December 3
- Winner: (Ontario) Glenn Howard
- Curling club: Coldwater & District CC, Coldwater
- Skip: Glenn Howard
- Third: Richard Hart
- Second: Brent Laing
- Lead: Craig Savill
- Finalist: (Alberta) Randy Ferbey

The 2006 Home Hardware Masters of Curling was held from November 29 to December 3, 2006 at the Waterloo Memorial Recreation Complex in Waterloo, Ontario. The event is not to be confused with the February event that happened in the same year but in the previous season.

Glenn Howard's rink won their first of four straight Masters tournaments, defeating Randy Ferbey's rink in the final with a score of 5–4.

== Round robin standings ==
Key
| Teams to Playoffs |
| Teams to Tiebreaker |

| Pool A | W | L |
|---|---|---|
| (Alberta) Kevin Martin | 4 | 1 |
| (Ontario) John Base | 3 | 2 |
| (Saskatchewan) Pat Simmons | 3 | 2 |
| (Scotland) Tom Brewster | 2 | 3 |
| (Manitoba) Kerry Burtnyk | 2 | 3 |
| (Quebec) Jean-Michel Menard | 1 | 4 |

| Pool A | W | L |
|---|---|---|
| (Alberta) Don Walchuk | 4 | 1 |
| (Alberta) Randy Ferbey | 3 | 2 |
| (Alberta) Kevin Koe | 3 | 2 |
| (Manitoba) Jeff Stoughton | 2 | 3 |
| (Alberta) Mark Johnson | 2 | 3 |
| (United States) Pete Fenson | 1 | 4 |

| Pool A | W | L |
|---|---|---|
| (Ontario) Wayne Middaugh | 4 | 1 |
| (Ontario) Glenn Howard | 4 | 1 |
| (Nova Scotia) Shawn Adams | 3 | 2 |
| (Quebec) Pierre Charette | 2 | 3 |
| (Newfoundland and Labrador) Brad Gushue | 2 | 3 |
| (British Columbia) Bob Ursel | 0 | 5 |

== Playoffs ==
Tie breakers:

- Simmons 6, Adams 3

Quarterfinals
(Ontario) Base | 7
(Alberta) Walchuk | 4
(Ontario) Howard | 5
(Saskatchewan) Simmons | 2
(Alberta) Ferbey | 7
(Ontario) Middaugh | 6
(Alberta) Martin | 6
(Alberta) Koe | 4

Semifinals
(Ontario) Base | 1
(Ontario) Howard | 8
(Alberta) Ferbey | 8
(Alberta) Martin | 5

Finals
(Ontario) Howard | 5
(Alberta) Ferbey | 4
