= 2008 Masters of Curling (January) =

Grand Slam of Curling event

The 2008 Masters of Curling was held January 23–27, 2008 at the Credit Union Centre in Saskatoon, Saskatchewan. It was the third Grand Slam event of the 2007-08 curling season.

Glenn Howard's rink won their second straight Masters tournament, defeating Kevin Koe's rink in the final. Howard's rink won $C24,000 and the total purse of the event was $100,000.

The Masters would be held again in November 2008, in the following season in which the same two teams would play in the final.

== Draw ==
=== Pool A ===
Team	W	L
(Ontario) Glenn Howard	4	1
(Newfoundland and Labrador) Brad Gushue	3	2
(Quebec) Martin Ferland	3	2
(British Columbia) Greg McAulay	2	3
(Manitoba) Jeff Stoughton	2	3
(Ontario) Team Corner	1	4

=== Pool B ===
Team	W	L
(Ontario) Wayne Middaugh	4	1
(Alberta) Randy Ferbey	4	1
(Alberta) Kevin Koe	4	1
(Saskatchewan) Joel Jordison	1	4
(Manitoba) Reid Carruthers	1	4
(Alberta) Jamie King	1	4

=== Pool C ===
Team	W	L
(Manitoba) Kerry Burtnyk	5	0
(Saskatchewan) Pat Simmons	3	2
(Alberta) Kevin Martin	3	2
(Norway) Thomas Ulsrud	2	3
(Nova Scotia) Shawn Adams	1	4
(United States) Jason Larway	1	4

=== Playoffs ===
Tie breakers:

- Ferland 6-5 Gushue

Quarterfinals
(Manitoba) Burtnyk	9
(Quebec) Ferland	3
(Alberta) Ferbey	1
(Alberta) Koe	8
(Ontario) Howard	4
(Alberta) Martin	3
(Ontario) Middaugh	5
(Saskatchewan) Simmons	4

Semifinals
(Manitoba) Burtnyk	3
(Alberta) Koe	9
(Ontario) Howard	5
(Ontario) Middaugh	3

Finals
(Alberta) Koe	3
(Ontario) Howard	7
