= Vic Peters =

Canadian curler

- Curler
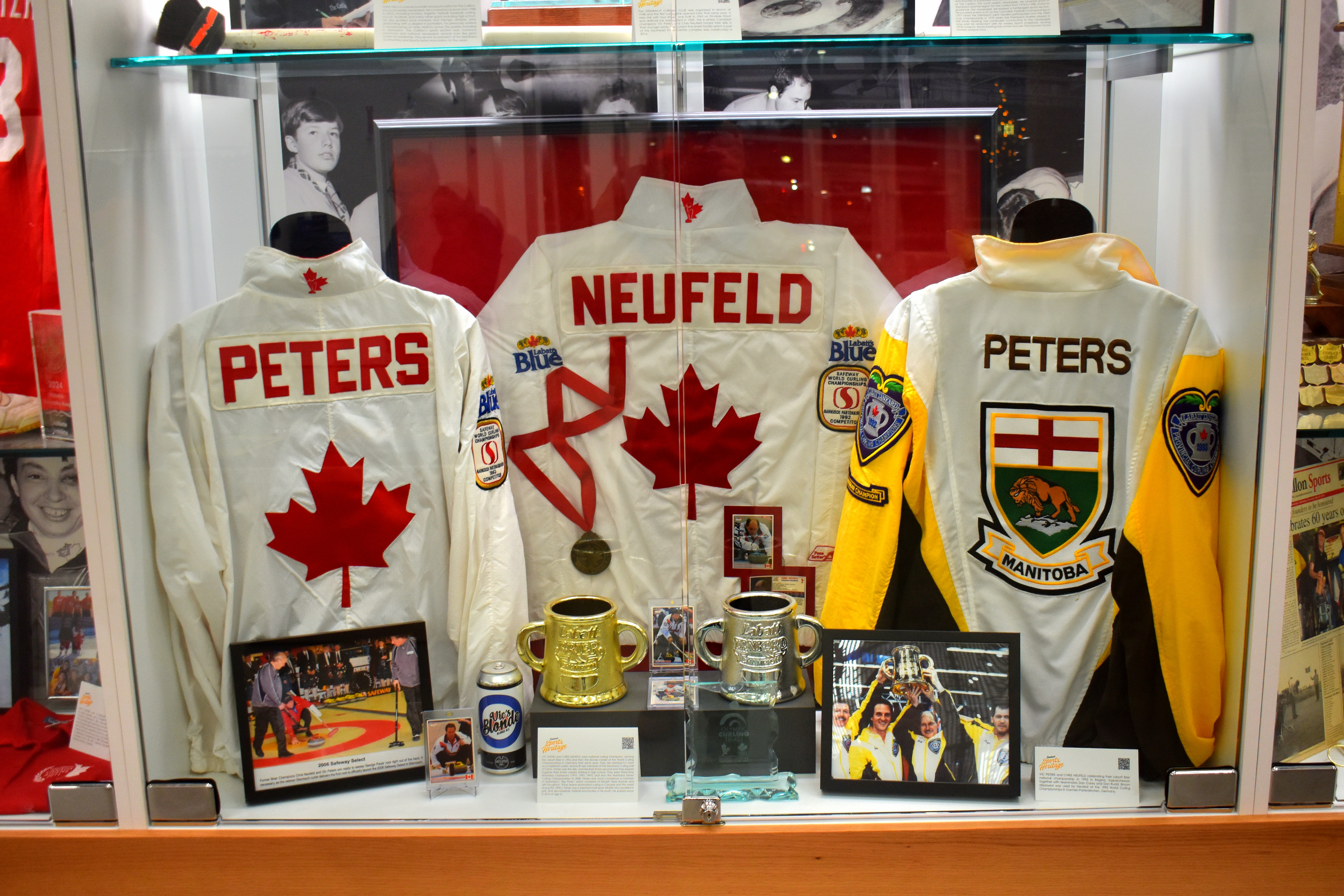
- Some of Vic Peters curling jackets and other sports memorabilia on exhibit in Steinbach.
- Born: March 24, 1955; Steinbach, Manitoba, Canada
- Died: March 27, 2016 (aged 61); Winnipeg, Manitoba, Canada

Curling career
- Brier: 3 (1992, 1993, 1997)
- Top CTRS ranking: 19th (2003–04)
Medal record
Curling
Representing Canada
World Championships
Bronze medal – third place	1992	Garmisch-Partenkirchen
Representing Manitoba
Labatt Brier
Gold medal – first place	1992	Regina
Silver medal – second place	1997	Calgary
Canadian Olympic Curling Trials
Bronze medal – third place	1997	Brandon

Victor Alvin Peters (March 24, 1955 – March 27, 2016) was a Canadian curler who was a three-time Manitoba curling champion, and one-time national champion as winner of the 1992 Labatt Brier.

Peters was once considered a member of Manitoba's "Big Three", which consisted of himself, Kerry Burtnyk and Jeff Stoughton. These teams dominated curling in Canada and the world during the 1990s, winning four Labatt Briers and two world championships. Peters was noted for his tuck delivery alongside Burtnyk and Stoughton.

== Career ==
Peters won his first and only national championship on his first visit to the Brier in 1992. This earned him a trip to the World Curling Championships in Germany where his team finished third. Peters team won the national championship under the traditional curling rules, but in Europe they played under the 4-rock free guard zone rule. As the Peters team (and many Canadian curlers) had not adapted to this new rule, they struggled in the World Championships. He returned to the Brier again the next year in 1993 but did not reach the final.

Peters team won the Safeway Select again returning to the 1997 Brier, where they had a successful week topping off the round robin as the leader, and reached the final to face Kevin Martin where they lost 10–8 in a thrilling final. Peters won the Ross Harstone Trophy in 1997 as the curler with who best represents sportsmanship, observance of the rules, exemplary conduct and curling ability.

This was Peters' last visit to the Brier. He went on to curl with his son Daley Peters and later in the senior division. He won the 2008 Manitoba Senior Curling Championships with Chris Neufeld and played in the Canadian Senior Curling Championships but did not win.

Peters again qualified for the Safeway Championship in 2011, this time skipping but throwing third stones while son Daley threw fourth. Peters surprised many by being one of four teams to qualify for the championship round, but they would lose in the 3 vs 4 game to Mike McEwen in an extra end. Peters was named as an all-star for the tournament in the third position.

Peters played his entire career with fellow hometown curler Chris Neufeld. The two curled together since their high school days at the Steinbach Regional Secondary School in Steinbach.

== Personal ==
Peters was the son of Jacob Peters, a school superintendent and Margaret Klassen, a seamstress. Both of his parents were Russian-born Mennonite refugees who fled to Canada in the 1920s after the Russian Revolution and settled in Steinbach, Manitoba. In his youth, Peters also played baseball, softball and ice hockey. He played for the Steinbach Millers junior hockey team until an eye injury ended his career at age 19. Peters' son Daley was back to back Manitoba junior champion in 2004 and 2005. His daughter Liz Fyfe is also a curler and won the 2008 Canadian Junior Curling Championships as a second on the Kaitlyn Lawes team. She would also make three Hearts appearances in 2016, 2018 and 2019.

== Death ==
Peters was diagnosed with cancer in his lymph nodes, also known as lymphoma in 2011. He had a node removed 30 years earlier before noticing the cancer again in his fifties. After the diagnosis Peters underwent chemotherapy and radiation treatments over the following years. He died of the cancer on March 27, 2016, at the age of 61 and three days after his birthday.

== Grand Slam Record ==
Key
C	Champion
F	Lost in Final
SF	Lost in Semifinal
QF	Lost in Quarterfinals
R16	Lost in the round of 16
Q	Did not advance to playoffs
T2	Played in Tier 2 event
DNP	Did not participate in event
N/A	Not a Grand Slam event that season

Event	2001–02	2002–03	2003–04	2004–05	2005–06
Canadian Open	QF	SF	Q	QF	DNP
Masters	QF	F	Q	Q	QF
The National	QF	SF	QF	Q	DNP
Players' Championships	F	QF	DNP	DNP	DNP
