= Steve Gould (curler) =

Canadian curler

- Curler
- Born: October 6, 1972 (age 54); Winnipeg, Manitoba

Curling career
- Brier: 8 (1996, 1999, 2006, 2007, 2009, 2010, 2011, 2015)
- World Championship: 3 (1996, 1999, 2011)
- Grand Slam victories: 2 World Cup: 1 (2004); Canadian Open: 1 (2006)
Medal record
Men's curling
Representing Canada
World Curling Championships
Gold medal – first place	2011 Regina
Gold medal – first place	1996 Hamilton
Silver medal – second place	1999 Saint John
Representing Manitoba
Tim Hortons Brier
Gold medal – first place	1996 Kamloops
Gold medal – first place	1999 Edmonton
Gold medal – first place	2011 London
Silver medal – second place	2009 Calgary
Bronze medal – third place	2007 Hamilton
Canadian Olympic Curling Trials
Silver medal – second place	2005 Halifax
Bronze medal – third place	2009 Edmonton

Stephen "Steve" Gould (born October 6, 1972, in Winnipeg, Manitoba) is a Canadian retired curler from Headingley, Manitoba. As a lead for Jeff Stoughton, he won 2 World Championships and 3 Briers. He is currently the coach of the Brent Pierce rink.

== Career ==
Gould played lead for Stoughton in two stints from 1995 to 1997 and 2003 to March 2012. Between those times he also played lead for Vic Peters, Dale Duguid, Barry Fry and also an alternate stint for Stoughton in 1999. With Stoughton, he won three Briers (1996, 1999, and 2011) a World Curling Championship in both 1996 and 2011, as well as a silver medal in 1999. He has also won six provincial championships with Stoughton. He is the only two-time winner (1999 and 2006) of the annual Ford Hot Shots skills and shot-making competition that precedes the start of play at the Brier.

Gould left the Stoughton rink in 2012, and did not play in competitive curling for the 2012-13 curling season except for the 2013 The Dominion All-Star Curling Skins Game. Fans voted Gould to play in the event, and he was selected to play lead with Carter Rycroft, John Morris and skip Glenn Howard. The team won the event, defeating the team skipped by Kevin Koe. During the event, Gould announced he would be retiring from curling.

Gould is nicknamed the "Tick Man" for being one of the first curlers to popularize the "tick shot" in curling. The defensive shot is usually only used by leads, and it involves moving opposing guards to the side of the sheet, without removing them, which would be a violation of the free guard rule.

== Personal life ==
Gould is the owner of Gould and Sons roofing. He has two children.
