= Pierre Charette =

Canadian curler (born 1955)

- Curler
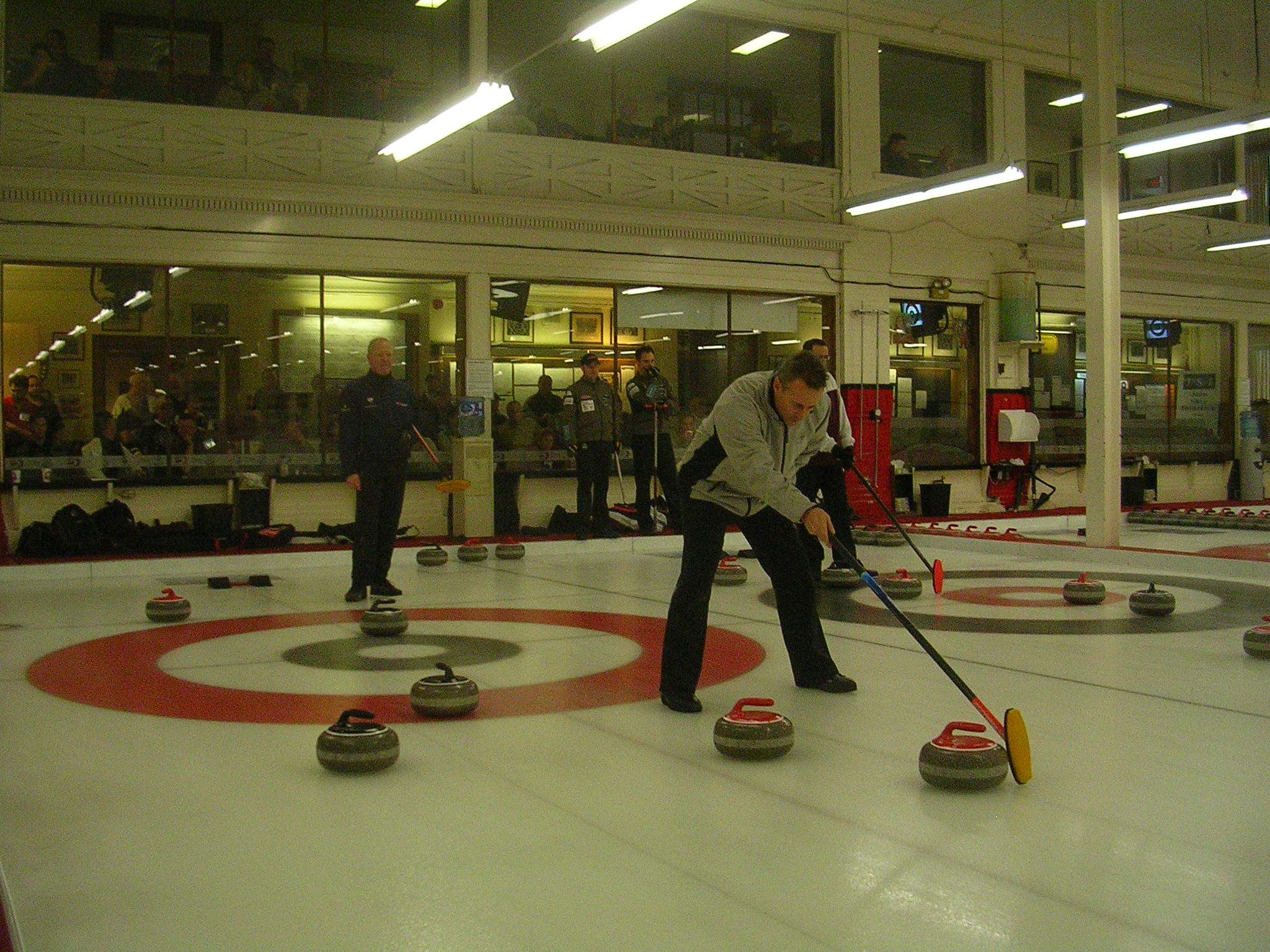
- Born: June 23, 1955 (age 71); Masson, Quebec, Canada

Team
- Curling club: CC Thurso, Thurso, QC

Curling career
- Member Association: Quebec (1989-2000; 2001-present); Ontario (2000-2001)
- Brier: 15 (1989, 1991, 1992, 1993, 1996, 1997, 1998, 1999, 2007, 2013, 2014, 2016, 2017, 2023)
- Top CTRS ranking: 14th (2005-06, 2006-07)
- Grand Slam victories: 1 (2003 National)
Medal record
Men's curling
Representing Quebec
Labatt Brier
Silver medal – second place	1998 Winnipeg
Silver medal – second place	1999 Edmonton
Bronze medal – third place	1996 Kamloops

Pierre G. "the Duffer" Charette (born June 23, 1955) is a Canadian curler from Gatineau, Quebec. He currently coaches the Silvana Tirinzoni rink and the Jean-Michel Ménard rink.

== Career ==
Born in Masson, Quebec, Charette has played in thirteen Briers, and was the first curler to have played every position (including alternate) at a Brier. He skipped teams in 1989, 1993 and 2007; played third for Guy Hemmings in 1998 and 1999, played second for Don Westphal in 1997, played lead for Westphal in 1996 and was the alternate for Kevin Adams in 1991, Ted Butler in 1992 and Jean-Michel Ménard in 2013, 2014, 2016 and 2017.

Charette's best performance at the Brier was the two years he played for Hemmings, where they lost in the Brier final on both occasions.

Charette had to qualify for the 2007 Tim Hortons Brier by defeating defending Brier champion Jean-Michel Ménard in the Quebec final 12–8.

In 2001, Charette played third for Peter Corner in the Ontario provincial championships, but they finished 3–6.

After the 2010-11 curling season ended, Serge Reid's team announced in a tweet that Charette would be joining their rink as skip and would throw lead stones. He played with them for one season before forming a new team with Richard Faguy, Louis Biron and Maurice Cayouette.

== Personal life ==
Charette is employed as the president of GolfXtra. He has two children.
