= Collin Mitchell =

Canadian curler (born 1969)

- Curler
- Born: September 23, 1969 (age 57); Freeport, Bahamas

Team
- Curling club: Whitby CC, Whitby, Ontario

Curling career
- Member Association: Ontario
Medal record
Representing Canada
Men's curling
Olympic Games
| Silver medal – second place | 1998 Nagano | Team |
Canadian Olympic Curling Trials
| Gold medal – first place | 1997 Brandon |

Collin Mitchell (born September 23, 1969 in Freeport, Bahamas) is a Canadian curler and coach from Brooklin, Ontario. He is an Olympic silver medallist. He received a silver medal with the Mike Harris curling team at the 1998 Winter Olympics in Nagano. At the time of the 1998 Olympics, he was a resident of Pickering, Ontario.

== Personal life ==
Mitchell is president of W. Mitchell & Son Mechanical Ltd. He is married and has three children.
