= 2016 Pinty's All-Star Curling Skins Game =

- Host city: Banff, Alberta
- Arena: The Fenlands Banff Recreation Centre
- Dates: January 8–10
- Men's winner: (Ontario) Team Jacobs
- Curling club: Soo CA, Sault Ste. Marie
- Skip: Brad Jacobs
- Third: Ryan Fry
- Second: E. J. Harnden
- Lead: Ryan Harnden
- Finalist: (Newfoundland and Labrador) Brad Gushue
- Women's winner: (Manitoba) Team Jones
- Curling club: St. Vital CC, Winnipeg
- Skip: Jennifer Jones
- Third: Kaitlyn Lawes
- Second: Jill Officer
- Lead: Dawn McEwen
- Finalist: (Alberta) Valerie Sweeting

The 2016 Pinty's All-Star Curling Skins Game was held from January 8 to 10 at The Fenlands Banff Recreation Centre in Banff, Alberta.

== Men ==
=== Teams ===
Team Gushue

Bally Haly Golf & Curling Club, St. John's, Newfoundland and Labrador

Skip: Brad Gushue
Third: Mark Nichols
Second: Brett Gallant
Lead: Geoff Walker

Team Jacobs

Soo Curlers Association, Sault Ste. Marie, Ontario

Skip: Brad Jacobs
Third: Ryan Fry
Second: E. J. Harnden
Lead: Ryan Harnden

Team McEwen

Fort Rouge Curling Club, Winnipeg, Manitoba

Skip: Mike McEwen
Third: B. J. Neufeld
Second: Matt Wozniak
Lead: Denni Neufeld

Team Simmons

Glencoe Curling Club, Calgary, Alberta

Skip: Pat Simmons
Third: John Morris
Second: Carter Rycroft
Lead: Nolan Thiessen

=== Results ===
All times listed in Eastern Standard Time.

==== Semifinals ====
Gushue vs. Simmons

Saturday, January 9, 11:00 am

Values (CAD)	$1000	$1000	$1500	$1500	$2000	$3000	$4500	$6500	$21,000
Team	1	2	3	4	5	6	7	8	Total
Brad Gushue	X		$	$		$		$	$19,000
Pat Simmons		X			$		X		$2,000

Jacobs vs. McEwen

Saturday, January 9, 9:00 pm

Values (CAD)	$1000	$1000	$1500	$1500	$2000	$3000	$4500	$6500	$21,000
Team	1	2	3	4	5	6	7	8	Total
Brad Jacobs			$	$		$		$	$17,000
Mike McEwen	$	$			$		X		$4,000

==== Final ====
Gushue vs. Jacobs

Sunday, January 10, 8:00 pm

Values (CAD)	$2000	$2000	$3000	$3000	$4000	$6000	$9000	$13000	$42000
Team	1	2	3	4	5	6	7	8	Total
Brad Gushue	X		$		X		X		$3,000
Brad Jacobs		$		$		X		$	$39,000

=== Winnings ===
The prize winnings for each team are listed below:

Skip	Semifinal	Final	Bonus	Total
Brad Jacobs	$17,000	$39,000	$15,000 (Note: Winner bonus)	$71,000
Brad Gushue	$19,000	$3,000		$22,000
Mike McEwen	$4,000		$1,000 (Note: The winner of the draw to the button challenge receives a bonus of $1,000.)	$5,000
Pat Simmons	$2,000			$2,000
Total prize money				$100,000

== Women ==
=== Teams ===
Team Homan

Ottawa Curling Club, Ottawa, Ontario

Skip: Rachel Homan
Third: Emma Miskew
Second: Joanne Courtney
Lead: Lisa Weagle

Team Jones

St. Vital Curling Club, Winnipeg, Manitoba

Skip: Jennifer Jones
Third: Kaitlyn Lawes
Second: Jill Officer
Lead: Dawn McEwen

Team Rocque

Saville Sports Centre, Edmonton, Alberta

Skip: Kelsey Rocque
Third: Laura Crocker
Second: Taylor McDonald
Lead: Jen Gates

Team Sweeting

Saville Sports Centre, Edmonton, Alberta

Skip: Val Sweeting
Third: Lori Olson-Johns
Second: Dana Ferguson
Lead: Rachelle Brown

=== Results ===
All times listed in Eastern Standard Time.

==== Semifinals ====
Homan vs. Sweeting

Friday, January 8, 8:00 pm

Values (CAD)	$1000	$1000	$1500	$1500	$2000	$3000	$4500	$6500		$21,000
Team	1	2	3	4	5	6	7	8	Button	Total
Rachel Homan	$		$			$		X		$6,500
Val Sweeting		X		$	$		$		$	$14,500

Jones vs. Rocque

Saturday, January 9, 4:00 pm

Values (CAD)	$1000	$1000	$1500	$1500	$2000	$3000	$4500	$6500		$21,000
Team	1	2	3	4	5	6	7	8	Button	Total
Jennifer Jones			$	$			$		$	$14,000
Kelsey Rocque	X	$			X	$		X		$7,000

==== Final ====
Sweeting vs. Jones

Sunday, January 10, 1:00 pm

Values (CAD)	$2000	$2000	$3000	$3000	$4000	$6000	$9000	$13000	
Team	1	2	3	4	5	6	7	8	Total
Valerie Sweeting	$	$		X		$			$17,000
Jennifer Jones			$		X		X	$	$25,000

=== Winnings ===
The prize winnings for each team are listed below:

Skip	Semifinal	Final	Bonus	Total
Jennifer Jones	$14,000	$25,000	$15,000	$54,000
Valerie Sweeting	$14,500	$17,000		$31,500
Rachel Homan	$6,500		$1,000	$7,500
Kelsey Rocque	$7,000			$7,000
Total prize money				$100,000

== Notes ==
Preceded by 2015	2016 Pinty's All-Star Curling Skins Game; January 8–10	Succeeded by 2017
