= TSN All-Star Curling Skins Game =

Annual curling bonspiel

- Established: 1986
- Host city: Banff, Alberta
- Arena: The Fenlands Banff Recreation Centre

Current champions (2019)
- Men: Team Brendan Bottcher
- Women: Team Jennifer Jones

Current edition
- 2019 TSN All-Star Curling Skins Game

The TSN All-Star Curling Skins Game is an annual curling bonspiel hosted by The Sports Network. "Skins" curling had been developed as a way to make curling more interesting on TV during the time before the free guard zone rule was implemented. The bonspiel was held annually from 1986 to 2004 before being revived as the Casino Rama Curling Skins Game in 2007. In 2013, Dominion of Canada took over naming rights to the event, which also shifted into an all-star format featuring teams of top Canadian curling players, but the format reverted to the original format in 2015, when Pinty's acquired the naming rights to the event.

In skins curling, teams compete for "skins" rather than points. A team can win a skin by stealing an end or scoring two or more points in an end while with the hammer.

== History ==
The first Skins Game was held in 1986 in Newmarket, Ontario.

=== McCain TSN Skins Game ===
In 1989, McCain Foods Limited teamed up with TSN, and the tournament became known as the "McCain TSN Skins Game." The tournament was held every year until 2004. The McCain skins event involved four teams: the defending champion, the defending Brier champion, and the winner of an east and west Superspiel.

A women's skins game was also held from 1996 to 2003 and was sponsored by JVC.

=== Casino Rama TSN Skins Game ===
After three years of the event's absence, TSN revived the event in December 2007, with Casino Rama as the main sponsor. It was held at the Casino Rama Entertainment Centre until 2013. From 2007 to 2011, it had a total cash purse of $100,000. It was reduced to $75,000 in 2012, but was increased back to $100,000 in 2013.

The 2007 event was held on December 8 and 9 and featured the teams of 2006 Olympic Champion Brad Gushue, 1987, 1993 & 2007 World Champion Glenn Howard, 2002 Olympic silver medalist Kevin Martin and 1993 & 1998 World Champion Wayne Middaugh. The second edition was held January 10 and 11, 2009 and featured defending champion (and 2008 World Champion) Kevin Martin, Howard, 1989, 2002, 2003 & 2005 World Champion Randy Ferbey, and for the first time, a women's team, skipped by 2008 World Women's Champion, Jennifer Jones. The 2010 event was notable for the victory of the World Champion David Murdoch rink, who became the first non-Canadian to skip the winning skins game team. The 2011 event included the Olympic women's silver medalist team Cheryl Bernard, the second women's team to appear at the Skins Game.

=== All-Star Curling Skins Game ===
In 2013, the Dominion of Canada General Insurance Company became the title sponsor of the event, and the name of the event was adjusted to The Dominion All-Star Curling Skins Game. The format of the event was preserved, but the new event established new qualification rules which would put together four all-star teams from the top ten teams in the Canadian Curling Association's rankings.

During the 2013 broadcast it was announced future Dominion All-Star Curling Skins Games would be held at a different location, to be announced.

The Travelers Companies took over sponsorship of the event for 2014 (which was held in Banff, Alberta) following its acquisition of The Dominion. Food brand Pinty's acquired title sponsorship for 2015.

The event was not held in 2018 due to the 2018 Winter Olympics, but returned in 2019 as the TSN All-Star Curling Skins Game.

== Competition format ==
The event consists of three games, two semifinals games and one final game. Each game consists of eight ends of play, and each end is worth a different amount of money. The winners of the two semifinals games will compete in the final.

From 2007 to 2012, the event consisted of four teams that were invited by the sponsors. They usually included the defending champion, the most recent Brier champion and/or the most recent World Champion. Occasionally a woman's team was invited.

In 2013 and 2014, the teams were selected based on fan voting on TSN's website, similar to All-Star games in other sports. The top ten teams on the CCA rankings system in the previous year were nominated, and the top four skip selections based on fan voting participated in a draw two days prior to the event. Each skip in turn chose players from the top four third, second and lead selections based on fan voting, and the four All-Star teams competed in the established format.

In 2015, the event reverted to the previous invite-based system, and a women's division was added to the event.

== Past champions ==
=== Men ===
McCain TSN Skins Game
| Event | Champion skip | Host | Winnings (CAD) |
|---|---|---|---|
| 1986 | Ed Werenich | Newmarket, Ontario | $16,000 |
| 1987 | Ed Lukowich | Thunder Bay, Ontario | $19,250 |
| 1988 | Ed Werenich | Brandon, Manitoba | $22,900 |
| 1989 | Mark Dacey | Winnipeg, Manitoba | $28,000 |
| 1990 | Ed Werenich | Charlottetown, Prince Edward Island | $38,750 |
| 1991 | Russ Howard | Calgary, Alberta | $42,250 |
| 1992 | Russ Howard | Quebec City, Quebec | $37,300 |
| 1993 | Russ Howard | Ottawa, Ontario | $37,000 |
| 1994 | Ed Werenich | Saskatoon, Saskatchewan | $45,750 |
| 1995 | Wayne Middaugh | Halifax, Nova Scotia | $45,750 |
| 1996 | Wayne Middaugh | Sault Ste. Marie, Ontario | $64,800 |
| 1997 | Kevin Martin | Cranbrook, British Columbia | $46,900 |
| 1998 | Kevin Martin | St. John's, Newfoundland | $50,450 |
| 1999 | Wayne Middaugh | Whitehorse, Yukon | $58,900 |
| 2000 | Greg McAulay | Fredericton, New Brunswick | $66,100 |
| 2001 | Glenn Howard | Barrie, Ontario | $77,200 |
| 2002 | Randy Ferbey | Grande Prairie, Alberta | $79,500 |
| 2003 | Wayne Middaugh | Gimli, Manitoba | $88,000 |
| 2004 | Kevin Martin | Bathurst, New Brunswick | $100,500 |

Casino Rama TSN Skins Game
| Event | Host | Champion team | Winnings (CAD) | Purse (CAD) |
|---|---|---|---|---|
| 2007 | Rama, Ontario | Kevin Martin, John Morris, Marc Kennedy, Ben Hebert | $61,000 | $100,000 |
| 2009 | Rama, Ontario | Randy Ferbey, David Nedohin, Scott Pfeifer, Marcel Rocque | $70,000 | $100,000 |
| 2010 | Rama, Ontario | David Murdoch, Ewan MacDonald, Peter Smith, Euan Byers | $70,500 | $100,000 |
| 2011 | Rama, Ontario | Kevin Martin, John Morris, Marc Kennedy, Ben Hebert | $57,000 | $100,000 |
| 2012 | Rama, Ontario | Kevin Koe, Pat Simmons, Carter Rycroft, Nolan Thiessen | $43,900 | $75,000 |
The Dominion All-Star Curling Skins Game
| Event | Host | Champion team | Winnings (CAD) | Purse (CAD) |
| 2013 | Rama, Ontario | Glenn Howard, John Morris, Carter Rycroft, Steve Gould | $51,500 | $100,000 |
Travelers All-Star Curling Skins Game
| Event | Host | Champion team | Winnings (CAD) | Purse (CAD) |
| 2014 | Banff, Alberta | Jeff Stoughton, David Nedohin, Brent Laing, Ryan Harnden | $70,500 | $100,000 |
Pinty's All-Star Curling Skins Game
| Event | Host | Champion team | Winnings (CAD) | Purse (CAD) |
| 2015 | Banff, Alberta | Brad Jacobs, Ryan Fry, E. J. Harnden, Ryan Harnden | $65,500 | $100,000 |
| 2016 | Banff, Alberta | Brad Jacobs, Ryan Fry, E. J. Harnden, Ryan Harnden | $71,000 | $100,000 |
| 2017 | Banff, Alberta | Kevin Koe, Marc Kennedy, Brent Laing, Ben Hebert | $75,500 | $100,000 |
TSN All-Star Curling Skins Game
| Event | Host | Champion team | Winnings (CAD) | Purse (CAD) |
| 2019 | Banff, Alberta | Brendan Bottcher, Darren Moulding, Bradley Thiessen, Karrick Martin | $54,500 | $100,000 |

=== Women ===
JVC TSN Women's Skin Game
| Year | Champion skip | Winnings (CAD) |
|---|---|---|
| 1996 | Heather Houston | $34,700 |
| 1997 | Shannon Kleibrink | $46,000 |
| 1998 | Sandra Schmirler | $46,500 |
| 1999 | Sherry Anderson | $64,250 |
| 2000 | Kelley Law | $51,700 |
| 2001 | Sherry Middaugh | $44,850 |
| 2002 | Kelley Law | $50,750 |
| 2003 | Sherry Middaugh | $65,000 |

Pinty's All-Star Curling Skins Game
| Event | Host | Champion team | Winnings (CAD) | Purse (CAD) |
|---|---|---|---|---|
| 2015 | Banff, Alberta | Rachel Homan, Emma Miskew, Joanne Courtney, Lisa Weagle | $52,000 | $100,000 |
| 2016 | Banff, Alberta | Jennifer Jones, Kaitlyn Lawes, Jill Officer, Dawn McEwen | $54,000 | $100,000 |
| 2017 | Banff, Alberta | Jennifer Jones, Kaitlyn Lawes, Jill Officer, Dawn McEwen | $53,000 | $100,000 |
TSN All-Star Curling Skins Game
| Event | Host | Champion team | Winnings (CAD) | Purse (CAD) |
| 2019 | Banff, Alberta | Jennifer Jones, Kaitlyn Lawes, Jocelyn Peterman, Dawn McEwen | $51,000 | $100,000 |
