= 2015 Pinty's All-Star Curling Skins Game =

- Host city: Banff, Alberta
- Arena: The Fenlands Banff Recreation Centre
- Dates: January 16–18
- Men's winner: Team Brad Jacobs
- Curling club: Soo CA, Sault Ste. Marie, Ontario
- Skip: Brad Jacobs
- Third: Ryan Fry
- Second: E. J. Harnden
- Lead: Ryan Harnden
- Finalist: Team John Morris
- Women's winner: Team Rachel Homan
- Curling club: Ottawa CC, Ottawa, Ontario
- Skip: Rachel Homan
- Third: Emma Miskew
- Second: Joanne Courtney
- Lead: Lisa Weagle
- Finalist: Team Jennifer Jones

The 2015 Pinty's All-Star Curling Skins Game was held from January 16 to 18 at The Fenlands Banff Recreation Centre in Banff, Alberta.

The competition format in this edition of the TSN Skins Game reverts to the format used prior to 2013, in which four teams will play a simple knockout bracket to determine the winner. In addition, a women's event was added to the TSN Skins Game for the first time since 2003.

== Men ==
Team Glenn Howard was originally invited, but opted to compete in the Challenge Round for the 2015 Ontario Tankard after failing to advance through the regional qualifier. Since the challenge round will be held on the same weekend as the TSN Skins game, Team McEwen replaced Team Howard.

=== Teams ===
Team Jacobs

Soo Curlers Association, Sault Ste. Marie, Ontario

Skip: Brad Jacobs
Third: Ryan Fry
Second: E. J. Harnden
Lead: Ryan Harnden

Team Koe

Glencoe Curling Club, Calgary, Alberta

Skip: Kevin Koe
Third: Marc Kennedy
Second: Brent Laing
Lead: Ben Hebert

Team McEwen

Fort Rouge Curling Club, Winnipeg, Manitoba

Skip: Mike McEwen
Third: B. J. Neufeld
Second: Matt Wozniak
Lead: Denni Neufeld

Team Morris

Glencoe Curling Club, Calgary, Alberta

Skip: John Morris
Third: Pat Simmons
Second: Carter Rycroft
Lead: Nolan Thiessen

=== Results ===
All times listed in Eastern Standard Time.

==== Semifinals ====
Morris vs. Koe

Saturday, January 17, 11:00 am

Values (CAD)	$1000	$1000	$1500	$1500	$2000	$3000	$4500	$6500	$21,000
Team	1	2	3	4	5	6	7	8	Total
John Morris 🔨	X		X		X		X	$	$19,000
Kevin Koe		$		X		X			$2,000

Jacobs vs. McEwen

Saturday, January 17, 9:00 pm

Values (CAD)	$1000	$1000	$1500	$1500	$2000	$3000	$4500	$6500	$21,000
Team	1	2	3	4	5	6	7	8	Total
Brad Jacobs 🔨	$				$	$		$	$12,500
Mike McEwen		X	$	$			$		$8,500

==== Final ====
Sunday, January 18, 8:00 pm

Values (CAD)	$2000	$2000	$3000	$3000	$4000	$6000	$9000	$13000		
Team	1	2	3	4	5	6	7	8	Button	Total
John Morris		$		X		X		X		$4,000
Brad Jacobs 🔨	X		$		X		$		$	$38,000

=== Winnings ===
The prize winnings for each team are listed below:

Skip	Semifinal	Final	Bonus	Total
Brad Jacobs	$12,500	$38,000	$15,000 (Note: Winner bonus)	$65,500
John Morris	$19,000	$4,000		$23,000
Mike McEwen	$8,500			$8,500
Kevin Koe	$2,000		$1,000 (Note: The winner of the draw to the button challenge receives a bonus of $1,000.)	$3,000
Total prize money				$100,000

== Women ==
=== Teams ===
Team Carey

Saville Sports Centre, Edmonton, Alberta

Skip: Chelsea Carey
Third: Laura Crocker
Second: Taylor McDonald
Lead: Jen Gates

Team Homan

Ottawa Curling Club, Ottawa, Ontario

Skip: Rachel Homan
Third: Emma Miskew
Second: Joanne Courtney
Lead: Lisa Weagle

Team Jones

St. Vital Curling Club, Winnipeg, Manitoba

Skip: Jennifer Jones
Third: Kaitlyn Lawes
Second: Jill Officer
Lead: Dawn McEwen

Team Sweeting

Saville Sports Centre, Edmonton, Alberta

Skip: Val Sweeting
Third: Lori Olson-Johns
Second: Dana Ferguson
Lead: Rachelle Brown

=== Results ===
All times listed in Eastern Standard Time.

==== Semifinals ====
Homan vs. Sweeting

Friday, January 16, 8:00 pm

Values (CAD)	$1000	$1000	$1500	$1500	$2000	$3000	$4500	$6500		$21,000
Team	1	2	3	4	5	6	7	8	Button	Total
Rachel Homan 🔨	X			$	$	$	$			$11,000
Val Sweeting		$	$					X	$	$10,000

Jones vs. Carey

Saturday, January 17, 4:00 pm

Values (CAD)	$1000	$1000	$1500	$1500	$2000	$3000	$4500	$6500	$21,000
Team	1	2	3	4	5	6	7	8	Total
Jennifer Jones				$			X	$	$12,500
Chelsea Carey 🔨	$	$	$		X	$			$8,500

==== Final ====
Sunday, January 18, 3:00 pm

Values (CAD)	$2000	$2000	$3000	$3000	$4000	$6000	$9000	$13000	
Team	1	2	3	4	5	6	7	8	Total
Rachel Homan 🔨	$	$		$		$		$	$26,000
Jennifer Jones			$		$		$		$16,000

=== Winnings ===
The prize winnings for each team are listed below:

Skip	Semifinal	Final	Bonus	Total
Rachel Homan	$11,000	$26,000	$15,000	$52,000
Jennifer Jones	$12,500	$16,000	$1,000	$29,500
Valerie Sweeting	$10,000			$10,000
Chelsea Carey	$8,500			$8,500
Total prize money				$100,000

== Notes ==
Preceded by 2014	2015 Pinty's All-Star Curling Skins Game; January 16–18	Succeeded by 2016
