= 2014 Canada Cup of Curling =

2014 Home Hardware Canada Cup of Curling
- Host city: Camrose, Alberta
- Arena: Encana Arena
- Dates: December 3–7
- Attendance: 9,847
- Men's winner: (Manitoba) Mike McEwen
- Curling club: Fort Rouge CC, Winnipeg
- Skip: Mike McEwen
- Third: B. J. Neufeld
- Second: Matt Wozniak
- Lead: Denni Neufeld
- Finalist: (Ontario) Brad Jacobs
- Women's winner: (Alberta) Val Sweeting
- Curling club: Saville SC, Edmonton
- Skip: Val Sweeting
- Third: Lori Olson-Johns
- Second: Dana Ferguson
- Lead: Rachelle Brown
- Finalist: (Ontario) Rachel Homan

The 2014 Home Hardware Canada Cup of Curling was held from December 3 to 7 at the Encana Arena in Camrose, Alberta. It was the first time that Camrose hosted the Canada Cup, and the second time that Alberta hosted the Canada Cup, which was also held in Medicine Hat in 2010.

== Men ==
=== Teams ===
The teams are listed as follows:

Skip	Third	Second	Lead	Locale
Jim Cotter	Ryan Kuhn	Tyrel Griffith	Rick Sawatsky	(British Columbia) Vernon CC, Vernon
Brad Gushue	Mark Nichols	Brett Gallant	Geoff Walker	(Newfoundland and Labrador) Bally Haly G&CC, St. John's
Glenn Howard	Richard Hart	Jon Mead	Craig Savill	(Ontario) Penetanguishene CC, Penetanguishene
Brad Jacobs	Ryan Fry	E. J. Harnden	Ryan Harnden	(Ontario) Soo CA, Sault Ste. Marie
Kevin Koe	Marc Kennedy	Brent Laing	Ben Hebert	(Alberta) Glencoe CC, Calgary
Mike McEwen	B. J. Neufeld	Matt Wozniak	Denni Neufeld	(Manitoba) Fort Rouge CC, Winnipeg
John Morris	Pat Simmons	Carter Rycroft	Nolan Thiessen	(Alberta) Glencoe CC, Calgary

=== Round Robin Standings ===
Final Round Robin Standings

Key
Teams to Playoffs

Skip	W	L
(Ontario) Brad Jacobs	4	2
(Ontario) Glenn Howard	4	2
(Manitoba) Mike McEwen	4	2
(Alberta) Kevin Koe	3	3
(Newfoundland and Labrador) Brad Gushue	3	3
(British Columbia) Jim Cotter	2	4
(Alberta) John Morris	1	5

=== Round Robin Results ===
The draw is listed as follows:

==== Draw 1 ====
Wednesday, December 3, 8:30 am

Sheet C	1	2	3	4	5	6	7	8	9	10	Final
(Alberta) Kevin Koe	3	0	0	0	1	0	0	3	1	X	8
(Ontario) Brad Jacobs	0	0	1	1	0	0	2	0	0	X	4

Sheet D	1	2	3	4	5	6	7	8	9	10	11	Final
(Ontario) Glenn Howard	0	1	1	0	0	3	0	1	0	0	1	7
(Alberta) John Morris	0	0	0	1	1	0	3	0	0	1	0	6

==== Draw 2 ====
Wednesday, December 3, 1:30 pm

Sheet A	1	2	3	4	5	6	7	8	9	10	Final
(British Columbia) Jim Cotter	0	2	0	0	0	1	1	0	0	0	4
(Alberta) John Morris	0	0	0	2	1	0	0	1	1	2	7

Sheet D	1	2	3	4	5	6	7	8	9	10	Final
(Newfoundland and Labrador) Brad Gushue	0	0	1	0	1	0	1	0	X	X	3
(Manitoba) Mike McEwen	0	2	0	3	0	3	0	1	X	X	9

==== Draw 3 ====
Wednesday, December 3, 6:30 pm

Sheet B	1	2	3	4	5	6	7	8	9	10	Final
(Alberta) Kevin Koe	0	0	0	1	0	0	0	1	X	X	2
(Manitoba) Mike McEwen	0	2	2	0	3	1	0	0	X	X	8

Sheet D	1	2	3	4	5	6	7	8	9	10	Final
(Ontario) Brad Jacobs	0	2	0	1	3	0	2	0	X	X	8
(British Columbia) Jim Cotter	0	0	1	0	0	1	0	2	X	X	4

Sheet E	1	2	3	4	5	6	7	8	9	10	Final
(Newfoundland and Labrador) Brad Gushue	1	0	0	0	2	0	1	0	0	X	4
(Ontario) Glenn Howard	0	1	0	0	0	3	0	2	4	X	10

==== Draw 4 ====
Thursday, December 4, 8:30 am

Sheet B	1	2	3	4	5	6	7	8	9	10	Final
(Alberta) John Morris	0	0	0	2	1	0	1	0	2	0	6
(Newfoundland and Labrador) Brad Gushue	0	4	1	0	0	1	0	1	0	1	8

Sheet C	1	2	3	4	5	6	7	8	9	10	Final
(British Columbia) Jim Cotter	0	0	0	2	0	1	0	1	X	X	4
(Manitoba) Mike McEwen	0	1	2	0	2	0	4	0	X	X	9

==== Draw 5 ====
Thursday, December 4, 1:30 pm

Sheet A	1	2	3	4	5	6	7	8	9	10	Final
(Manitoba) Mike McEwen	0	1	0	0	0	0	1	0	1	0	3
(Ontario) Glenn Howard	1	0	0	0	0	1	0	1	0	1	4

Sheet C	1	2	3	4	5	6	7	8	9	10	Final
(Ontario) Brad Jacobs	0	1	1	0	0	0	1	0	1	0	4
(Newfoundland and Labrador) Brad Gushue	0	0	0	0	0	1	0	2	0	2	5

Sheet D	1	2	3	4	5	6	7	8	9	10	Final
(British Columbia) Jim Cotter	0	2	0	0	2	1	0	1	1	X	7
(Alberta) Kevin Koe	0	0	2	0	0	0	0	0	0	X	2

==== Draw 6 ====
Thursday, December 4, 6:30 pm

Sheet B	1	2	3	4	5	6	7	8	9	10	Final
(Ontario) Brad Jacobs	0	2	0	1	0	2	1	1	0	X	7
(Ontario) Glenn Howard	0	0	2	0	1	0	0	0	1	X	4

Sheet E	1	2	3	4	5	6	7	8	9	10	11	Final
(Alberta) John Morris	2	0	1	0	0	2	0	1	0	1	0	7
(Alberta) Kevin Koe	0	1	0	2	1	0	1	0	2	0	1	8

==== Draw 7 ====
Friday, December 5, 8:30 am

Sheet B	1	2	3	4	5	6	7	8	9	10	Final
(Newfoundland and Labrador) Brad Gushue	0	0	0	0	1	0	0	3	0	1	5
(British Columbia) Jim Cotter	0	0	0	0	0	1	0	0	3	0	4

Sheet E	1	2	3	4	5	6	7	8	9	10	11	Final
(Manitoba) Mike McEwen	0	0	1	0	2	0	0	1	1	0	0	5
(Ontario) Brad Jacobs	0	1	0	1	0	0	2	0	0	1	2	7

==== Draw 8 ====
Friday, December 5, 1:30 pm

Sheet C	1	2	3	4	5	6	7	8	9	10	Final
(Ontario) Glenn Howard	0	0	0	1	0	0	1	0	0	2	4
(Alberta) Kevin Koe	0	0	0	0	0	1	0	2	0	0	3

Sheet D	1	2	3	4	5	6	7	8	9	10	Final
(Alberta) John Morris	0	0	2	0	0	2	0	2	0	0	6
(Ontario) Brad Jacobs	0	2	0	2	0	0	3	0	1	3	11

==== Draw 9 ====
Friday, December 5, 6:30 pm

Sheet A	1	2	3	4	5	6	7	8	9	10	Final
(Alberta) Kevin Koe	0	1	0	2	0	2	1	2	2	X	10
(Newfoundland and Labrador) Brad Gushue	1	0	1	0	2	0	0	0	0	X	4

Sheet B	1	2	3	4	5	6	7	8	9	10	Final
(Manitoba) Mike McEwen	2	0	2	0	0	0	2	0	1	X	7
(Alberta) John Morris	0	1	0	0	1	0	0	2	0	X	4

Sheet E	1	2	3	4	5	6	7	8	9	10	Final
(Ontario) Glenn Howard	2	0	0	1	0	0	1	0	0	0	4
(British Columbia) Jim Cotter	0	1	1	0	0	1	0	1	1	1	6

=== Playoffs ===
Semifinal			Final
			1	(Ontario) Brad Jacobs	3
2	(Ontario) Glenn Howard	4	3	(Manitoba) Mike McEwen	8
3	(Manitoba) Mike McEwen	5

==== Semifinal ====
Saturday, December 6, 6:30 pm

Sheet B	1	2	3	4	5	6	7	8	9	10	11	Final
(Ontario) Glenn Howard	0	0	0	0	1	0	0	1	0	2	0	4
(Manitoba) Mike McEwen	0	0	0	2	0	1	0	0	1	0	1	5

Player percentages
(Ontario) Team Howard		(Manitoba) Team McEwen	
Craig Savill	92%	Denni Neufeld	91%
Jon Mead	95%	Matt Wozniak	94%
Richard Hart	84%	B. J. Neufeld	90%
Glenn Howard	89%	Mike McEwen	89%
Total	90%	Total	91%

==== Final ====
Sunday, December 7, 5:00 pm

Sheet C	1	2	3	4	5	6	7	8	9	10	Final
(Ontario) Brad Jacobs	0	0	2	0	0	0	1	0	X	X	3
(Manitoba) Mike McEwen	2	3	0	2	0	0	0	1	X	X	8

Player percentages
(Ontario) Team Jacobs		(Manitoba) Team McEwen	
Ryan Harnden	94%	Denni Neufeld	88%
E. J. Harnden	80%	Matt Wozniak	89%
Ryan Fry	85%	B. J. Neufeld	100%
Brad Jacobs	72%	Mike McEwen	80%
Total	82%	Total	89%

== Women ==
=== Teams ===
The teams are listed as follows:

Skip	Third	Second	Lead	Alternate	Locale
Allison Flaxey	Katie Cottrill	Kristen Foster	Morgan Court		(Ontario) Listowel CC, Listowel
Rachel Homan	Emma Miskew	Joanne Courtney	Lisa Weagle		(Ontario) Ottawa CC, Ottawa
Jennifer Jones	Kaitlyn Lawes	Jill Officer	Dawn McEwen		(Manitoba) St. Vital CC, Winnipeg
Sherry Middaugh	Jo-Ann Rizzo	Lee Merklinger	Leigh Armstrong	Lori Eddy	(Ontario) Coldwater & District CC, Coldwater
Sherry Anderson	Sherri Singler	Marliese Kasner	Stephanie McVicar		(Saskatchewan) Nutana CC, Saskatoon
Heather Nedohin	Amy Nixon	Jocelyn Peterman	Laine Peters	Jessica Mair	(Alberta) Sherwood Park CC, Sherwood Park
Val Sweeting	Lori Olson-Johns	Dana Ferguson	Rachelle Brown		(Alberta) Saville SC, Edmonton

=== Round Robin Standings ===
Final Round Robin Standings

Key
Teams to Playoffs

Skip	W	L
(Ontario) Rachel Homan	5	1
(Alberta) Heather Nedohin	4	2
(Alberta) Val Sweeting	4	2
(Saskatchewan) Sherry Anderson	3	3
(Manitoba) Jennifer Jones	3	3
(Ontario) Sherry Middaugh	1	5
(Ontario) Allison Flaxey	1	5

=== Round Robin Results ===
The draw is listed as follows:

==== Draw 1 ====
Wednesday, December 3, 8:30 am

Sheet A	1	2	3	4	5	6	7	8	9	10	Final
(Alberta) Val Sweeting	0	0	3	0	0	1	0	2	0	0	6
(Alberta) Heather Nedohin	3	1	0	0	1	0	2	0	1	4	12

Sheet B	1	2	3	4	5	6	7	8	9	10	Final
(Ontario) Rachel Homan	1	1	0	1	0	2	0	2	0	X	7
(Ontario) Sherry Middaugh	0	0	1	0	1	0	1	0	1	X	4

==== Draw 2 ====
Wednesday, December 3, 1:30 pm

Sheet B	1	2	3	4	5	6	7	8	9	10	Final
(Alberta) Heather Nedohin	1	0	3	0	0	0	2	0	3	X	9
(Manitoba) Jennifer Jones	0	1	0	0	3	0	0	1	0	X	5

Sheet C	1	2	3	4	5	6	7	8	9	10	Final
(Ontario) Allison Flaxey	0	0	0	3	0	0	0	0	X	X	3
(Ontario) Rachel Homan	0	2	2	0	1	1	0	5	X	X	11

Sheet E	1	2	3	4	5	6	7	8	9	10	Final
(Saskatchewan) Sherry Anderson	2	1	1	0	0	2	1	1	X	X	8
(Ontario) Sherry Middaugh	0	0	0	2	1	0	0	0	X	X	3

==== Draw 3 ====
Wednesday, December 3, 6:30 pm

Sheet A	1	2	3	4	5	6	7	8	9	10	Final
(Manitoba) Jennifer Jones	3	0	1	1	0	1	0	2	0	1	9
(Ontario) Allison Flaxey	0	2	0	0	4	0	1	0	1	0	8

Sheet C	1	2	3	4	5	6	7	8	9	10	Final
(Alberta) Val Sweeting	0	0	0	2	0	2	1	0	3	X	8
(Saskatchewan) Sherry Anderson	0	0	1	0	0	0	0	1	0	X	2

==== Draw 4 ====
Thursday, December 4, 8:30 am

Sheet D	1	2	3	4	5	6	7	8	9	10	Final
(Ontario) Sherry Middaugh	0	1	2	0	1	1	0	2	0	X	7
(Manitoba) Jennifer Jones	2	0	0	3	0	0	2	0	5	X	12

Sheet E	1	2	3	4	5	6	7	8	9	10	Final
(Ontario) Rachel Homan	1	1	0	0	1	0	0	1	0	1	5
(Alberta) Heather Nedohin	0	0	2	0	0	1	0	0	1	0	4

==== Draw 5 ====
Thursday, December 4, 1:30 pm

Sheet B	1	2	3	4	5	6	7	8	9	10	Final
(Ontario) Allison Flaxey	0	0	1	0	0	2	0	0	2	0	5
(Saskatchewan) Sherry Anderson	0	2	0	1	1	0	0	2	0	1	7

Sheet E	1	2	3	4	5	6	7	8	9	10	11	Final
(Manitoba) Jennifer Jones	0	1	2	0	2	0	2	0	1	0	0	8
(Alberta) Val Sweeting	1	0	0	2	0	2	0	2	0	1	2	10

==== Draw 6 ====
Thursday, December 4, 6:30 pm

Sheet A	1	2	3	4	5	6	7	8	9	10	Final
(Ontario) Allison Flaxey	0	0	2	0	2	0	1	0	2	0	7
(Ontario) Sherry Middaugh	1	1	0	1	0	2	0	1	0	2	8

Sheet C	1	2	3	4	5	6	7	8	9	10	11	Final
(Ontario) Rachel Homan	1	0	2	0	1	1	0	0	1	0	1	7
(Alberta) Val Sweeting	0	1	0	1	0	0	0	2	0	2	0	6

Sheet D	1	2	3	4	5	6	7	8	9	10	Final
(Alberta) Heather Nedohin	0	0	1	0	0	0	4	0	2	X	7
(Saskatchewan) Sherry Anderson	0	1	0	2	0	0	0	1	0	X	4

==== Draw 7 ====
Friday, December 5, 8:30 am

Sheet C	1	2	3	4	5	6	7	8	9	10	11	Final
(Saskatchewan) Sherry Anderson	1	0	2	0	0	0	0	1	0	2	0	6
(Manitoba) Jennifer Jones	0	2	0	2	0	0	1	0	1	0	1	7

Sheet D	1	2	3	4	5	6	7	8	9	10	Final
(Alberta) Val Sweeting	0	1	1	1	0	2	0	1	0	2	8
(Ontario) Allison Flaxey	1	0	0	0	1	0	1	0	2	0	5

==== Draw 8 ====
Friday, December 5, 1:30 pm

Sheet A	1	2	3	4	5	6	7	8	9	10	Final
(Saskatchewan) Sherry Anderson	0	2	0	0	2	2	0	2	X	X	8
(Ontario) Rachel Homan	0	0	1	1	0	0	1	0	X	X	3

Sheet B	1	2	3	4	5	6	7	8	9	10	Final
(Ontario) Sherry Middaugh	0	1	0	2	0	0	0	1	0	0	4
(Alberta) Val Sweeting	0	0	1	0	2	0	1	0	0	1	5

Sheet E	1	2	3	4	5	6	7	8	9	10	Final
(Alberta) Heather Nedohin	0	1	0	1	0	0	1	0	1	0	4
(Ontario) Allison Flaxey	1	0	2	0	0	0	0	2	0	1	6

==== Draw 9 ====
Friday, December 5, 6:30 pm

Sheet C	1	2	3	4	5	6	7	8	9	10	Final
(Ontario) Sherry Middaugh	0	0	0	1	0	1	1	1	0	X	4
(Alberta) Heather Nedohin	0	3	2	0	1	0	0	0	1	X	7

Sheet D	1	2	3	4	5	6	7	8	9	10	Final
(Manitoba) Jennifer Jones	2	2	0	0	0	0	0	0	0	X	4
(Ontario) Rachel Homan	0	0	2	1	1	3	1	0	1	X	9

=== Playoffs ===
Semifinal			Final
			1	(Ontario) Rachel Homan	3
2	(Alberta) Heather Nedohin	6	3	(Alberta) Val Sweeting	6
3	(Alberta) Val Sweeting	7

==== Semifinal ====
Saturday, December 6, 1:30 pm

Sheet B	1	2	3	4	5	6	7	8	9	10	11	Final
(Alberta) Val Sweeting	0	0	1	0	2	0	0	2	1	0	1	7
(Alberta) Heather Nedohin	1	0	0	2	0	0	1	0	0	2	0	6

Player percentages
(Alberta) Team Sweeting		(Alberta) Team Nedohin	
Rachelle Brown	81%	Laine Peters	92%
Dana Ferguson	73%	Jocelyn Peterman	73%
Lori Olson-Johns	86%	Amy Nixon	76%
Val Sweeting	69%	Heather Nedohin	68%
Total	77%	Total	77%

==== Final ====
Sunday, December 7, 10:00 am

Sheet C	1	2	3	4	5	6	7	8	9	10	Final
(Ontario) Rachel Homan	0	0	1	0	0	1	0	1	0	0	3
(Alberta) Val Sweeting	0	0	0	1	1	0	1	0	2	1	6

Player percentages
(Ontario) Team Homan		(Alberta) Team Sweeting	
Lisa Weagle	95%	Rachelle Brown	96%
Joanne Courtney	69%	Dana Ferguson	81%
Emma Miskew	68%	Lori Olson-Johns	86%
Rachel Homan	74%	Val Sweeting	89%
Total	76%	Total	88%
