= 2016 Canada Cup of Curling =

2016 Home Hardware Canada Cup of Curling
- Host city: Brandon, Manitoba
- Arena: Westman Communications Group Place
- Dates: November 30 – December 4
- Attendance: 29,345
- Men's winner: (Manitoba) Team Carruthers
- Curling club: West St. Paul CC, West St. Paul, Manitoba
- Skip: Reid Carruthers
- Third: Braeden Moskowy
- Second: Derek Samagalski
- Lead: Colin Hodgson
- Coach: Dan Carey
- Finalist: (Newfoundland and Labrador) Team Gushue
- Women's winner: (Manitoba) Team Jones
- Curling club: St. Vital CC, Winnipeg, Manitoba
- Skip: Jennifer Jones
- Third: Kaitlyn Lawes
- Second: Jill Officer
- Lead: Dawn McEwen
- Coach: Wendy Morgan
- Finalist: (Ontario) Rachel Homan

The 2016 Home Hardware Canada Cup of Curling was held from November 30 to December 4 at Westman Communications Group Place in Brandon, Manitoba.

Reid Carruthers and his rink from Manitoba won the men's tournament, qualifying his team for the 2017 Canadian Olympic Curling Trials. Jennifer Jones, also from Manitoba and her team won the women's event, but had already previously qualified for the Olympic Trials.

== Men ==
=== Teams ===
The teams are listed as follows:

Skip	Third	Second	Lead	Locale
Reid Carruthers	Braeden Moskowy	Derek Samagalski	Colin Hodgson	(Manitoba) West St. Paul CC, West St. Paul
John Epping	Mat Camm	Pat Janssen	Tim March	(Ontario) Donalda CC, Toronto
Brad Jacobs	Ryan Fry	E. J. Harnden	Ryan Harnden	(Ontario) Community First CC, Sault Ste. Marie
Kevin Koe	Marc Kennedy	Brent Laing	Ben Hebert	(Alberta) The Glencoe, Calgary
Steve Laycock	Kirk Muyres	Colton Flasch	Dallan Muyres	(Saskatchewan) Nutana CC, Saskatoon
Mike McEwen	B. J. Neufeld	Matt Wozniak	Denni Neufeld	(Manitoba) Fort Rouge CC, Winnipeg
Mark Nichols	Charley Thomas	Brett Gallant	Geoff Walker	(Newfoundland and Labrador) Bally Haly G&CC, St. John's

=== Round-robin standings ===
Final round-robin standings

Key
Teams to Playoffs
Teams to Tiebreakers

Skip	W	L
(Newfoundland and Labrador) Team Gushue	4	2
(Manitoba) Reid Carruthers	4	2
(Ontario) John Epping	3	3
(Ontario) Brad Jacobs	3	3
(Saskatchewan) Steve Laycock	3	3
(Alberta) Kevin Koe	2	4
(Manitoba) Mike McEwen	2	4

=== Round-robin results ===
All times are listed in Central Daylight Time (UTC−05:00).

==== Draw 1 ====
Wednesday, November 30, 8:30 am

Sheet A	1	2	3	4	5	6	7	8	9	10	Final
(Manitoba) Reid Carruthers	0	0	2	1	0	0	4	1	X	X	8
(Ontario) John Epping 🔨	1	1	0	0	0	1	0	0	X	X	3

Sheet B	1	2	3	4	5	6	7	8	9	10	Final
(Manitoba) Mike McEwen	0	0	2	0	1	0	0	1	0	0	4
(Ontario) Brad Jacobs 🔨	0	1	0	1	0	0	1	0	0	2	5

==== Draw 2 ====
Wednesday, November 30, 1:30 pm

Sheet B	1	2	3	4	5	6	7	8	9	10	Final
(Ontario) John Epping	0	0	1	0	1	0	0	2	1	0	5
(Alberta) Kevin Koe 🔨	0	4	0	1	0	0	1	0	0	2	8

Sheet C	1	2	3	4	5	6	7	8	9	10	Final
(Saskatchewan) Steve Laycock	0	2	0	1	0	2	0	0	0	1	6
(Manitoba) Mike McEwen 🔨	2	0	1	0	1	0	0	0	1	0	5

Sheet E	1	2	3	4	5	6	7	8	9	10	Final
(Newfoundland and Labrador) Team Gushue 🔨	4	0	0	0	3	0	1	0	X	X	8
(Ontario) Brad Jacobs	0	1	0	0	0	1	0	1	X	X	3

==== Draw 3 ====
Wednesday, November 30, 6:30 pm

Sheet A	1	2	3	4	5	6	7	8	9	10	Final
(Alberta) Kevin Koe	0	0	0	1	0	2	0	2	0	X	5
(Saskatchewan) Steve Laycock 🔨	0	2	1	0	1	0	4	0	1	X	9

Sheet C	1	2	3	4	5	6	7	8	9	10	Final
(Manitoba) Reid Carruthers	0	0	0	2	0	0	2	0	2	0	6
(Newfoundland and Labrador) Team Gushue 🔨	0	0	2	0	2	1	0	1	0	1	7

==== Draw 4 ====
Thursday, December 1, 8:30 am

Sheet D	1	2	3	4	5	6	7	8	9	10	Final
(Ontario) Brad Jacobs 🔨	0	0	0	1	1	0	2	1	X	X	5
(Alberta) Kevin Koe	0	0	0	0	0	1	0	0	X	X	1

Sheet E	1	2	3	4	5	6	7	8	9	10	Final
(Manitoba) Mike McEwen 🔨	1	0	0	1	1	0	2	0	2	X	7
(Ontario) John Epping	0	0	1	0	0	1	0	1	0	X	3

==== Draw 5 ====
Thursday, December 1, 1:30 pm

Sheet B	1	2	3	4	5	6	7	8	9	10	Final
(Saskatchewan) Steve Laycock	0	0	0	3	0	1	0	2	0	0	6
(Newfoundland and Labrador) Team Gushue 🔨	0	1	0	0	2	0	2	0	1	1	7

Sheet E	1	2	3	4	5	6	7	8	9	10	Final
(Alberta) Kevin Koe	0	2	0	1	0	1	0	0	2	0	6
(Manitoba) Reid Carruthers 🔨	1	0	1	0	0	0	2	2	0	1	7

==== Draw 6 ====
Thursday, December 1, 6:30 pm

Sheet A	1	2	3	4	5	6	7	8	9	10	Final
(Saskatchewan) Steve Laycock	0	0	0	0	1	1	0	0	2	0	4
(Ontario) Brad Jacobs 🔨	0	0	0	2	0	0	0	3	0	1	6

Sheet C	1	2	3	4	5	6	7	8	9	10	Final
(Manitoba) Mike McEwen 🔨	0	1	0	0	1	1	0	0	0	0	3
(Manitoba) Reid Carruthers	0	0	2	1	0	0	0	0	0	1	4

Sheet D	1	2	3	4	5	6	7	8	9	10	Final
(Ontario) John Epping 🔨	1	2	0	0	0	2	0	3	X	X	8
(Newfoundland and Labrador) Team Gushue	0	0	0	2	0	0	2	0	X	X	4

==== Draw 7 ====
Friday, December 2, 8:30 am

Sheet C	1	2	3	4	5	6	7	8	9	10	Final
(Newfoundland and Labrador) Team Gushue 🔨	0	1	0	1	0	0	0	2	0	1	5
(Alberta) Kevin Koe	0	0	1	0	0	2	0	0	0	0	3

Sheet D	1	2	3	4	5	6	7	8	9	10	Final
(Manitoba) Reid Carruthers 🔨	0	0	1	0	0	2	0	0	0	0	3
(Saskatchewan) Steve Laycock	0	1	0	1	0	0	1	1	0	1	5

==== Draw 8 ====
Friday, December 2, 1:30 pm

Sheet A	1	2	3	4	5	6	7	8	9	10	11	Final
(Newfoundland and Labrador) Team Gushue 🔨	1	0	0	0	2	0	2	0	0	1	0	6
(Manitoba) Mike McEwen	0	2	0	1	0	1	0	1	1	0	2	8

Sheet B	1	2	3	4	5	6	7	8	9	10	Final
(Ontario) Brad Jacobs	0	0	0	0	0	1	0	0	0	X	1
(Manitoba) Reid Carruthers 🔨	0	1	0	0	0	0	0	2	2	X	5

Sheet E	1	2	3	4	5	6	7	8	9	10	Final
(Ontario) John Epping	0	2	0	1	0	1	0	2	2	0	8
(Saskatchewan) Steve Laycock 🔨	2	0	1	0	1	0	1	0	0	1	6

==== Draw 9 ====
Friday, December 2, 6:30 pm

Sheet C	1	2	3	4	5	6	7	8	9	10	Final
(Ontario) Brad Jacobs	0	1	1	1	0	1	0	0	1	1	6
(Ontario) John Epping 🔨	1	0	0	0	1	0	3	2	0	0	7

Sheet D	1	2	3	4	5	6	7	8	9	10	11	Final
(Alberta) Kevin Koe 🔨	0	1	0	3	0	1	0	0	1	0	1	7
(Manitoba) Mike McEwen	0	0	2	0	2	0	0	1	0	1	0	6

=== Tiebreakers ===
Saturday, December 3, 8:30 am

Sheet B	1	2	3	4	5	6	7	8	9	10	Final
(Ontario) Brad Jacobs 🔨	0	0	1	1	0	1	0	X	X	X	3
(Saskatchewan) Steve Laycock	0	1	0	0	5	0	3	X	X	X	9

Player percentages
(Ontario) Team Jacobs		(Saskatchewan) Team Laycock	
Ryan Harnden	84%	Dallan Muyres	86%
E. J. Harnden	91%	Colton Flasch	89%
Ryan Fry	77%	Kirk Muyres	80%
Brad Jacobs	73%	Steve Laycock	73%
Total	81%	Total	82%

Saturday, December 3, 1:30 pm

Sheet D	1	2	3	4	5	6	7	8	9	10	Final
(Ontario) John Epping 🔨	2	1	0	0	2	0	0	2	0	X	7
(Saskatchewan) Steve Laycock	0	0	0	2	0	2	0	0	1	X	5

Player percentages
(Ontario) Team Epping		(Saskatchewan) Team Laycock	
Tim March	83%	Dallan Muyres	95%
Pat Janssen	93%	Colton Flasch	78%
Mat Camm	84%	Kirk Muyres	81%
John Epping	90%	Steve Laycock	85%
Total	88%	Total	85%

=== Playoffs ===
Semifinal			Final
			1	(Newfoundland and Labrador) Team Gushue	6
2	(Manitoba) Reid Carruthers	6	2	(Manitoba) Reid Carruthers	8
3	(Ontario) John Epping	5

==== Semifinal ====
Saturday, December 3, 6:30 pm

Sheet C	1	2	3	4	5	6	7	8	9	10	11	Final
(Manitoba) Reid Carruthers 🔨	0	1	0	2	0	2	0	0	0	0	1	6
(Ontario) John Epping	0	0	0	0	1	0	2	1	0	1	0	5

Player percentages
(Manitoba) Team Carruthers		(Ontario) Team Epping	
Colin Hodgson	89%	Tim March	95%
Derek Samagalski	89%	Pat Janssen	77%
Braeden Moskowy	95%	Mat Camm	97%
Reid Carruthers	84%	John Epping	91%
Total	89%	Total	90%

==== Final ====
Sunday, December 4, 6:30 pm

Sheet C	1	2	3	4	5	6	7	8	9	10	Final
(Newfoundland and Labrador) Team Gushue 🔨	1	0	1	0	1	0	2	0	0	1	6
(Manitoba) Reid Carruthers	0	2	0	1	0	2	0	0	3	0	8

Player percentages
(Newfoundland and Labrador) Team Gushue		(Manitoba) Team Carruthers	
Geoff Walker	94%	Colin Hodgson	92%
Brett Gallant	89%	Derek Samagalski	88%
Charley Thomas	84%	Braeden Moskowy	86%
Mark Nichols	83%	Reid Carruthers	88%
Total	87%	Total	88%

=== Player percentages ===
After Round Robin Play

Leads	%	Seconds	%	Thirds	%	Skips	%
Colin Hodgson	89%	Derek Samagalski	86%	Braeden Moskowy	86%	Reid Carruthers	80%
Tim March	91%	Pat Janssen	78%	Mat Camm	79%	John Epping	78%
Geoff Walker	95%	Brett Gallant	88%	Charley Thomas	87%	Mark Nichols	83%
Ryan Harnden	84%	E. J. Harnden	86%	Ryan Fry	79%	Brad Jacobs	84%
Ben Hebert	90%	Brent Laing	90%	Marc Kennedy	89%	Kevin Koe	77%
Dallan Muyres	86%	Colton Flasch	88%	Kirk Muyres	83%	Steve Laycock	81%
Denni Neufeld	89%	Matt Wozniak	82%	B. J. Neufeld	88%	Mike McEwen	85%

== Women ==
=== Teams ===
The teams are listed as follows:

Skip	Third	Second	Lead	Alternate	Locale
Chelsea Carey	Amy Nixon	Jocelyn Peterman	Laine Peters		(Alberta) The Glencoe, Calgary
Kerri Einarson	Selena Kaatz	Liz Fyfe	Kristin MacCuish		(Manitoba) East St. Paul CC, East St. Paul
Tracy Fleury	Crystal Webster	Jenna Walsh	Amanda Gates	Jennifer Wylie	(Ontario) Idylwylde G&CC, Sudbury
Rachel Homan	Emma Miskew	Joanne Courtney	Lisa Weagle		(Ontario) Ottawa CC, Ottawa
Jennifer Jones	Kaitlyn Lawes	Jill Officer	Dawn McEwen		(Manitoba) St. Vital CC, Winnipeg
Kelsey Rocque	Laura Crocker	Taylor McDonald	Jen Gates		(Alberta) Saville Community SC, Edmonton
Val Sweeting	Lori Olson-Johns	Dana Ferguson	Rachelle Brown		(Alberta) Saville Community SC, Edmonton

=== Round-robin standings ===
Final round-robin standings

Key
Teams to Playoffs
Teams to Tiebreaker

Skip	W	L
(Manitoba) Jennifer Jones	5	1
(Ontario) Rachel Homan	4	2
(Manitoba) Kerri Einarson	3	3
(Alberta) Val Sweeting	3	3
(Alberta) Chelsea Carey	2	4
(Alberta) Kelsey Rocque	2	4
(Ontario) Tracy Fleury	2	4

=== Round-robin results ===
All times are listed in Central Daylight Time (UTC−05:00).

==== Draw 1 ====
Wednesday, November 30, 8:30 am

Sheet C	1	2	3	4	5	6	7	8	9	10	Final
(Manitoba) Kerri Einarson	1	1	1	0	0	1	0	2	1	1	8
(Alberta) Val Sweeting 🔨	0	0	0	2	1	0	2	0	0	0	5

Sheet D	1	2	3	4	5	6	7	8	9	10	Final
(Alberta) Kelsey Rocque	0	0	2	0	1	0	1	0	X	X	4
(Manitoba) Jennifer Jones 🔨	2	2	0	2	0	2	0	1	X	X	9

==== Draw 2 ====
Wednesday, November 30, 1:30 pm

Sheet A	1	2	3	4	5	6	7	8	9	10	Final
(Ontario) Tracy Fleury	0	0	1	1	0	0	1	0	1	X	4
(Manitoba) Jennifer Jones 🔨	1	2	0	0	0	1	0	2	0	X	6

Sheet D	1	2	3	4	5	6	7	8	9	10	Final
(Alberta) Chelsea Carey	0	1	0	1	0	1	0	0	1	0	4
(Ontario) Rachel Homan 🔨	0	0	1	0	1	0	1	1	0	2	6

==== Draw 3 ====
Wednesday, November 30, 6:30 pm

Sheet B	1	2	3	4	5	6	7	8	9	10	Final
(Manitoba) Kerri Einarson	0	2	1	0	1	0	2	0	0	2	8
(Ontario) Rachel Homan 🔨	0	0	0	3	0	0	0	0	2	0	5

Sheet D	1	2	3	4	5	6	7	8	9	10	11	Final
(Alberta) Val Sweeting 🔨	2	0	0	0	2	0	0	1	0	1	0	6
(Ontario) Tracy Fleury	0	0	2	1	0	0	1	0	2	0	1	7

Sheet E	1	2	3	4	5	6	7	8	9	10	Final
(Alberta) Chelsea Carey 🔨	4	0	3	0	3	0	0	1	X	X	11
(Alberta) Kelsey Rocque	0	1	0	1	0	2	1	0	X	X	5

==== Draw 4 ====
Thursday, December 1, 8:30 am

Sheet B	1	2	3	4	5	6	7	8	9	10	Final
(Manitoba) Jennifer Jones 🔨	4	1	0	0	1	0	3	0	3	X	12
(Alberta) Chelsea Carey	0	0	1	2	0	2	0	1	0	X	6

Sheet C	1	2	3	4	5	6	7	8	9	10	Final
(Ontario) Tracy Fleury	0	0	0	3	1	0	0	0	0	X	4
(Ontario) Rachel Homan 🔨	2	0	1	0	0	2	0	0	1	X	6

==== Draw 5 ====
Thursday, December 1, 1:30 pm

Sheet A	1	2	3	4	5	6	7	8	9	10	Final
(Ontario) Rachel Homan 🔨	2	1	0	3	0	1	0	1	0	0	8
(Alberta) Kelsey Rocque	0	0	2	0	1	0	1	0	2	1	7

Sheet C	1	2	3	4	5	6	7	8	9	10	Final
(Alberta) Val Sweeting	0	0	4	2	0	0	1	2	X	X	9
(Alberta) Chelsea Carey 🔨	0	1	0	0	2	1	0	0	X	X	4

Sheet D	1	2	3	4	5	6	7	8	9	10	Final
(Ontario) Tracy Fleury 🔨	0	2	0	0	2	0	0	2	1	1	8
(Manitoba) Kerri Einarson	1	0	0	1	0	2	3	0	0	0	7

==== Draw 6 ====
Thursday, December 1, 6:30 pm

Sheet B	1	2	3	4	5	6	7	8	9	10	Final
(Alberta) Val Sweeting 🔨	0	1	3	1	0	0	1	0	X	X	6
(Alberta) Kelsey Rocque	0	0	0	0	1	0	0	1	X	X	2

Sheet E	1	2	3	4	5	6	7	8	9	10	Final
(Manitoba) Jennifer Jones 🔨	2	0	2	0	2	2	1	0	X	X	9
(Manitoba) Kerri Einarson	0	1	0	2	0	0	0	1	X	X	4

==== Draw 7 ====
Friday, December 2, 8:30 am

Sheet B	1	2	3	4	5	6	7	8	9	10	Final
(Alberta) Chelsea Carey	0	0	0	0	3	0	2	0	2	X	7
(Ontario) Tracy Fleury 🔨	0	0	2	0	0	0	0	2	0	X	4

Sheet E	1	2	3	4	5	6	7	8	9	10	Final
(Ontario) Rachel Homan 🔨	2	0	2	0	1	1	1	0	X	X	7
(Alberta) Val Sweeting	0	1	0	1	0	0	0	1	X	X	3

==== Draw 8 ====
Friday, December 2, 1:30 pm

Sheet C	1	2	3	4	5	6	7	8	9	10	11	Final
(Alberta) Kelsey Rocque	1	0	0	1	0	2	0	0	1	0	1	6
(Manitoba) Kerri Einarson 🔨	0	1	0	0	1	0	0	1	0	2	0	5

Sheet D	1	2	3	4	5	6	7	8	9	10	Final
(Manitoba) Jennifer Jones 🔨	0	0	2	0	1	0	1	0	0	X	4
(Alberta) Val Sweeting	1	0	0	2	0	1	0	1	1	X	6

==== Draw 9 ====
Friday, December 2, 6:30 pm

Sheet A	1	2	3	4	5	6	7	8	9	10	Final
(Manitoba) Kerri Einarson 🔨	2	0	0	2	0	2	0	1	0	1	8
(Alberta) Chelsea Carey	0	1	1	0	1	0	1	0	2	0	6

Sheet B	1	2	3	4	5	6	7	8	9	10	Final
(Ontario) Rachel Homan	0	1	0	0	1	0	0	2	0	X	4
(Manitoba) Jennifer Jones 🔨	2	0	2	1	0	0	3	0	1	X	9

Sheet E	1	2	3	4	5	6	7	8	9	10	Final
(Alberta) Kelsey Rocque 🔨	0	0	1	0	2	0	2	0	1	0	6
(Ontario) Tracy Fleury	0	0	0	2	0	1	0	1	0	1	5

=== Tiebreaker ===
Saturday, December 3, 8:30 am

Sheet D	1	2	3	4	5	6	7	8	9	10	Final
(Manitoba) Kerri Einarson 🔨	1	0	2	0	0	1	0	1	0	3	8
(Alberta) Val Sweeting	0	1	0	1	1	0	2	0	1	0	6

Player percentages
(Manitoba) Team Einarson		(Alberta) Team Sweeting	
Kristin MacCuish	88%	Rachelle Brown	74%
Liz Fyfe	85%	Dana Ferguson	83%
Selena Njegovan	76%	Lori Olson-Johns	75%
Kerri Einarson	79%	Val Sweeting	84%
Total	82%	Total	79%

=== Playoffs ===
Semifinal			Final
			1	(Manitoba) Jennifer Jones	9
2	(Ontario) Rachel Homan	9	2	(Ontario) Rachel Homan	5
3	(Manitoba) Kerri Einarson	4

==== Semifinal ====
Saturday, December 3, 1:30 pm

Sheet C	1	2	3	4	5	6	7	8	9	10	Final
(Ontario) Rachel Homan 🔨	1	0	1	3	0	0	1	0	3	X	9
(Manitoba) Kerri Einarson	0	2	0	0	1	0	0	1	0	X	4

Player percentages
(Ontario) Team Homan		(Manitoba) Team Einarson	
Lisa Weagle	82%	Kristin MacCuish	90%
Joanne Courtney	92%	Liz Fyfe	81%
Emma Miskew	93%	Selena Njegovan	71%
Rachel Homan	90%	Kerri Einarson	81%
Total	89%	Total	81%

==== Final ====
Sunday, December 4, 1:30 pm

Sheet C	1	2	3	4	5	6	7	8	9	10	Final
(Manitoba) Jennifer Jones 🔨	0	1	4	0	2	0	1	0	1	X	9
(Ontario) Rachel Homan	0	0	0	1	0	2	0	2	0	X	5

Player percentages
(Manitoba) Team Jones		(Ontario) Team Homan	
Dawn McEwen	79%	Lisa Weagle	100%
Jill Officer	92%	Joanne Courtney	72%
Kaitlyn Lawes	89%	Emma Miskew	68%
Jennifer Jones	78%	Rachel Homan	83%
Total	84%	Total	81%

=== Player percentages ===
After Round Robin Play

Leads	%	Seconds	%	Thirds	%	Skips	%
Laine Peters	85%	Jocelyn Peterman	77%	Amy Nixon	76%	Chelsea Carey	79%
Kristin MacCuish	82%	Liz Fyfe	78%	Selena Kaatz	80%	Kerri Einarson	75%
Amanda Gates	76%	Jenna Walsh	71%	Crystal Webster	72%	Tracy Fleury	73%
Lisa Weagle	83%	Joanne Courtney	81%	Emma Miskew	79%	Rachel Homan	78%
Dawn McEwen	83%	Jill Officer	84%	Kaitlyn Lawes	83%	Jennifer Jones	79%
Jen Gates	86%	Taylor McDonald	72%	Laura Walker	73%	Kelsey Rocque	76%
Rachelle Brown	82%	Dana Ferguson	74%	Lori Olson-Johns	75%	Val Sweeting	72%
