= 2011 Casino Rama Curling Skins Game =

The 2011 Casino Rama Curling Skins Game on TSN was held on January 22 and 23 at the Casino Rama Entertainment Centre in Rama, Ontario. The total purse for the event was CAD$100,000.

Four teams were invited to participate. They played one semi-final each on January 22, and the winners played in the final on January 23. Kevin Martin's rink secured the win, taking home a total of $31,000 in a win over David Murdoch, plus a bonus of $15,000. The total winnings for the Martin rink is $57,000, while Murdoch won $25,000.

== Teams ==
Invited to the 2011 Skins game include the defending champion David Murdoch rink from Scotland, the Olympic champion Kevin Martin rink, the World champion Kevin Koe rink, and the Olympic women's silver medallist Cheryl Bernard rink. The invitation of Bernard is the second time a women's team has been invited, the first being Jennifer Jones in 2009. Bernard held her own against the heavily favoured Olympic men's champion Kevin Martin, losing by $1000 in the semi-final match, despite winning more skins.

The inclusion of Team Bernard had been controversial, and the Team was at first reluctant to play. Scott Howard, the second on the (excluded) Team Wayne Middaugh rink stated "I think it should be four men's teams... Last time there was a women's team... my dad (Glenn Howard) smoked [them]... I think the ladies are going to get smoked again this year. I just don't see the ladies being able to make those angle raises for two and other similar shots. The men's game is a whole different game and they're not used to playing it." Middaugh stated, "strength and power have a huge impact on the entire game".

=== Team Bernard ===
Calgary Curling Club, Calgary, Alberta

- Skip: Cheryl Bernard
- Third: Susan O'Connor
- Second: Carolyn Darbyshire
- Lead: Cori Morris

=== Team Koe ===
Saville Sports Centre, Edmonton, Alberta

- Skip: Kevin Koe
- Third: Blake MacDonald
- Second: Carter Rycroft
- Lead: Nolan Thiessen

=== Team Martin ===
Saville Sports Centre, Edmonton, Alberta

- Skip: Kevin Martin
- Third: John Morris
- Second: Marc Kennedy
- Lead: Ben Hebert

=== Team Murdoch ===
Lockerbie Curling Club, Lockerbie, Scotland

- Skip: David Murdoch
- Third: Warwick Smith
- Second: Glen Muirhead
- Lead: Ross Hepburn

== Draw to the button ==
Kevin Koe's team won the draw to the button contest and an additional $1,000. The total team distance from the button was 3.1 cm. Meanwhile, Team Murdoch was 39.8 cm, Team Martin 194.3 cm and Team Bernard at 463.4 cm.

== Games ==
Semi-final dollar amounts

- 1st & 2nd end: $1000
- 3rd & 4th end: $1500
- 5th end: $2000
- 6th end: $3000
- 7th end: $4500
- 8th end: $6500

=== Koe vs. Murdoch ===
January 22, 1:00pm EST

Team	1	2	3	4	5	6	7	8	Final
Koe	-	$	$	-	-	-	$	-	7,000
Murdoch 🔨	$	-	-	-	-	$	-	$	14,000

=== Martin vs. Bernard ===
January 22, 8:00pm EST

Team	1	2	3	4	5	6	7	8	Final
Martin	-	-	-	-	$	-	$	-	$11,000
Bernard 🔨	$	$	$	-	-	-	-	$	$10,000

=== Final ===
January 23, 1:00pm EST

Final game dollar amounts

- 1st & 2nd end: $2000
- 3rd & 4th end: $3000
- 5th end: $4000
- 6th end: $6000
- 7th end: $9000
- 8th end: $13000

+ $15000 bonus for the winner

Team	1	2	3	4	5	6	7	8	Final
Murdoch 🔨	-	$	$	-	$	-	-	-	$11,000
Martin	-	-	-	$	-	$	$	$	$46,000

Preceded by 2010	2011 Casino Rama Curling Skins Game; January 22–23	Succeeded by 2012
