= 2013 The Dominion All-Star Curling Skins Game =

- Host city: Rama, Ontario
- Arena: Casino Rama Entertainment Centre
- Dates: January 19–20
- Winner: Team Glenn Howard
- Skip: Glenn Howard
- Third: John Morris
- Second: Carter Rycroft
- Lead: Steve Gould
- Finalist: Team Kevin Koe

The 2013 Dominion All-Star Curling Skins Game was held from January 19 to 20 at the Casino Rama Entertainment Centre in Rama, Ontario. The total purse for the event was CAD$100,000.

== Competition format ==
As in previous years, four teams will play two semifinals games, and the winners of the semifinals games will meet in the final to determine the winner. However, the teams will be chosen by fan voting and by random draw, similar to All-Star games in other sports. The top ten teams in the Canadian Curling Association's rankings system in the previous year are nominated, and the top four fan voting selections for each position (skip, third, second, lead) will play in the competition. The skips will each randomly draw their third, second, and lead from the top four selections, and the four All-Star teams will compete against each other.

== Teams ==
The teams were determined by a random draw in Toronto on January 17. The players that competed are listed as follows, ordered by number of votes earned:

Position	Name	Votes Earned
Skip	Glenn Howard	24,284
Skip	Jeff Stoughton	23,684
Skip	Kevin Martin	22,596
Skip	Kevin Koe	19,181
Third	John Morris	29,677
Third	Jon Mead	28,436
Third	Pat Simmons	18,010
Third	B. J. Neufeld	13,993
Second	Marc Kennedy	29,482
Second	Carter Rycroft	21,672
Second	Brent Laing	21,032
Second	Reid Carruthers	19,665
Lead	Ben Hebert	28,751
Lead	Craig Savill	23,815
Lead	Steve Gould	20,005
Lead	Nolan Thiessen	18,555

=== Roster ===
The teams are listed in draft order by skip. Skips selected their teammates in a snake order, and were not allowed to choose their own teammates unless necessary.

A donation was made to the Sandra Schmirler Foundation on behalf of Pat Simmons, who was selected last among the players.

Skip	Third	Second	Lead
Kevin Martin	Jon Mead	Reid Carruthers	Craig Savill
Kevin Koe	B. J. Neufeld	Brent Laing	Ben Hebert
Glenn Howard	John Morris	Carter Rycroft	Steve Gould
Jeff Stoughton	Pat Simmons	Marc Kennedy	Nolan Thiessen

== Results ==
Jeff Stoughton, who had last pick in the draft, was given the choice of picking his opponent in the semifinal, and Stoughton chose to play Team Kevin Koe in the first semifinal.

All draw times are listed in Eastern Standard Time (UTC−5).

=== Semifinals ===
==== Team Stoughton vs. Team Koe ====
Saturday, January 19, 1:00 pm

Values	$1000	$1000	$1500	$1500	$2000	$3000	$4500	$6500	$21,000
Team	1	2	3	4	5	6	7	8	Total
Team Jeff Stoughton			$		$		X		$3,500
Team Kevin Koe	$	$		$		X		$	$17,500

==== Team Martin vs. Team Howard ====
Saturday, January 19, 9:00 pm

Values	$1000	$1000	$1500	$1500	$2000	$3000	$4500	$6500		$21,000
Team	1	2	3	4	5	6	7	8	Button	Total
Team Kevin Martin			X		$		$			$6,500
Team Glenn Howard	$	$		$		$		X	$	$14,500

=== Final ===
==== Team Koe vs. Team Howard ====
Sunday, January 20, 1:00 pm

Values	$2000	$2000	$3000	$3000	$4000	$6000	$9000	$13000		$42000
Team	1	2	3	4	5	6	7	8	Button	Total
Team Kevin Koe	$		$		X			X	$	$20,000
Team Glenn Howard		X		$		$	$			$22,000

=== Final winnings ===
The final prize winnings for each team are listed below:

Skip	Semifinal	Final	Bonus	Total
Team Glenn Howard	$14,500	$22,000	$15,000 (Note: As the winner of the final game, Team Howard received a winner's bonus of $15,000.)	$51,500
Team Kevin Koe	$17,500	$20,000	$1,000 (Note: As the winner of the draw to the button challenge, Team Koe received a bonus of $1,000.)	$38,500
Team Kevin Martin	$6,500			$6,500
Team Jeff Stoughton	$3,500			$3,500
Total prize money				$100,000

== Notes ==
Preceded by 2012	2013 The Dominion All-Star Curling Skins Game; January 19–20	Succeeded by 2014
