= 2012 Casino Rama Curling Skins Game =

- Host city: Rama, Ontario
- Arena: Casino Rama Entertainment Centre
- Dates: January 7–8
- Winner: (Alberta) Kevin Koe
- Curling club: Saville SC, Edmonton
- Skip: Kevin Koe
- Third: Pat Simmons
- Second: Carter Rycroft
- Lead: Nolan Thiessen
- Finalist: (Manitoba) Jeff Stoughton

The 2012 Casino Rama Curling Skins Game on TSN was held on January 7 and 8 at the Casino Rama Entertainment Centre in Rama, Ontario. The total purse for the event was CAD$75,000.

Four teams were invited to participate. The teams each played a semifinal match against another team, and the semifinal winners moved on to the final.

== Teams ==
The 2012 TSN Skins Game sees four world champions playing against each other. Kevin Martin and his rink, the reigning Olympic champions, Alberta provincial champions, and former world champions, will play against Kevin Koe and his rink, former world and Albertan provincial champions, in the afternoon semifinal. Reigning world and Manitoban provincial champions Jeff Stoughton and team will play against Glenn Howard and his rink, former world champions and reigning Ontario provincial champions, in a rematch of the 2011 Tim Hortons Brier final in the evening semifinal.

=== Team Howard ===
Coldwater & District Curling Club, Coldwater, Ontario

Skip: Glenn Howard
Third: Wayne Middaugh
Second: Brent Laing
Lead: Craig Savill

=== Team Koe ===
Saville Sports Centre, Edmonton, Alberta

Skip: Kevin Koe
Third: Pat Simmons
Second: Carter Rycroft
Lead: Nolan Thiessen

=== Team Martin ===
Saville Sports Centre, Edmonton, Alberta

Skip: Kevin Martin
Third: John Morris
Second: Marc Kennedy
Lead: Ben Hebert

=== Team Stoughton ===
Charleswood Curling Club, Winnipeg, Manitoba

Skip: Jeff Stoughton
Third: Jon Mead
Second: Reid Carruthers
Lead: Steve Gould

== Results ==
All times listed in Eastern Standard Time.

=== Draw to the button challenge ===
Kevin Martin's team won the draw to the button challenge, which gave them an additional CAD$1,000 winnings.

- Martin: 46.1 cm
- Koe: 162.4 cm
- Stoughton: 220.7 cm
- Howard: 260.7 cm

=== Semifinals ===
==== Martin vs. Koe ====
Saturday, January 7, 1:00 pm

Values (CAD)	$1000	$1000	$1200	$1300	$1500	$2000	$3000	$5000	$16000
Team	1	2	3	4	5	6	7	8	Total
Kevin Martin			$		$		$		$5700
Kevin Koe	$	$		$		$		$	$10300

==== Howard vs. Stoughton ====
Saturday, January 7, 8:00 pm

Values (CAD)	$1000	$1000	$1200	$1300	$1500	$2000	$3000	$5000	$16000
Sheet C	1	2	3	4	5	6	7	8	Total
Glenn Howard			$		-				$1200
Jeff Stoughton	-	$		$		$	$	$	$14800

=== Final ===
==== Koe vs. Stoughton ====
Sunday, January 8, 1:00 pm

Values (CAD)	$2000	$2000	$2400	$2600	$3000	$4000	$6000	$10000	$32000
Team	1	2	3	4	5	6	7	8	Total
Kevin Koe	$	$		-	$	$		$	$23600
Jeff Stoughton			$				$		$8400

A CAD$10,000 bonus was awarded to the winner, Kevin Koe.

=== Final winnings ===
The final prize winnings for each team are listed below:

Skip	Semifinal	Final	Bonus	Total
Kevin Koe	$10,300	$23,600	$10,000 (Note: As the winner of the final game, Koe received a winner's bonus of $10,000.)	$43,900
Jeff Stoughton	$14,800	$8,400		$23,200
Kevin Martin	$5,700		$1,000 (Note: As the winner of the draw to the button challenge, Martin received a bonus of $1,000.)	$6,700
Glenn Howard	$1,200			$1,200
Total prize money				$75,000

== Notes ==
Preceded by 2011	2012 Casino Rama Curling Skins Game; January 7–8	Succeeded by 2013
