= 2014 Travelers All-Star Curling Skins Game =

- Host city: Banff, Alberta
- Arena: The Fenlands Banff Recreation Centre
- Dates: January 11–12
- Winner: Team Jeff Stoughton
- Skip: Jeff Stoughton
- Third: David Nedohin
- Second: Brent Laing
- Lead: Ryan Harnden
- Finalist: Team Kevin Martin

The 2014 Travelers All-Star Curling Skins Game was held on January 11 and 12 at The Fenlands Banff Recreation Centre in Banff, Alberta. The event featured a total prize purse of CAD$100,000.

== Teams ==
The competition featured players selected based on fan voting from the top ten teams in the Canadian Curling Association's rankings system from the previous year. Fans voted for their favorite players in each position-skip, (third second and lead). The top four players in each category were chosen to compete in the event.

The selected players are listed below:

Position	Name
Skip	Brad Gushue
Skip	Brad Jacobs
Skip	Jeff Stoughton
Skip	Kevin Martin
Third	David Nedohin
Third	John Morris
Third	Jon Mead
Third	Ryan Fry
Second	Brent Laing
Second	Carter Rycroft
Second	E. J. Harnden
Second	Marc Kennedy
Lead	Ben Hebert
Lead	Craig Savill
Lead	Mark Nichols
Lead	Ryan Harnden

=== Roster ===
The teams are listed in draft order by skip. Skips selected their teammates in a snake order, and were not allowed to choose their own teammates unless necessary. The draft was conducted on January 10.

A donation was made to the Banff Community Foundation on behalf of E. J. Harnden, who was selected last among the players.

Skip	Third	Second	Lead
Kevin Martin	Ryan Fry	Carter Rycroft	Mark Nichols
Jeff Stoughton	David Nedohin	Brent Laing	Ryan Harnden
Brad Jacobs	Jon Mead	Marc Kennedy	Craig Savill
Brad Gushue	John Morris	E. J. Harnden	Ben Hebert

== Results ==
Brad Gushue, who had last pick in the draft, was given the choice of picking his opponent in the semifinal, and Gushue chose to play Team Jeff Stoughton in the first semifinal.

All draw times are listed in Mountain Standard Time (UTC−7).

=== Semifinals ===
==== Team Gushue vs. Team Stoughton ====
Saturday, January 11, 11:00 am

Values (CAD)	$1000	$1000	$1500	$1500	$2000	$3000	$4500	$6500	$21,000
Team	1	2	3	4	5	6	7	8	Total
Team Brad Gushue		$	$			X			$3,500
Team Jeff Stoughton	X			X	$		$	$	$17,500

==== Team Martin vs. Team Jacobs ====
Saturday, January 19, 7:30 pm

Values (CAD)	$1000	$1000	$1500	$1500	$2000	$3000	$4500	$6500	$21,000
Team	1	2	3	4	5	6	7	8	Total
Team Kevin Martin	$	$		$	$		$		$11,500
Team Brad Jacobs			X			$		$	$9,500

=== Final ===
Sunday, January 12, 11:00 am

Values (CAD)	$2000	$2000	$3000	$3000	$4000	$6000	$9000	$13000		$42,000
Team	1	2	3	4	5	6	7	8	Button	Total
Team Jeff Stoughton			$		X	$		X	$	$38,000
Team Kevin Martin	X	$		X			X			$4,000

=== Final winnings ===
The final prize winnings for each team are listed below:

Skip	Semifinal	Final	Bonus	Total
Team Jeff Stoughton	$17,500	$38,000	$15,000 (Note: As the winner of the final game, Team Stoughton received a winner's bonus of $15,000.)	$70,500
Team Kevin Martin	$11,500	$4,000		$15,500
Team Brad Jacobs	$9,500			$9,500
Team Brad Gushue	$3,500		$1,000 (Note: As the winner of the draw to the button challenge, Team Gushue received a bonus of $1,000.)	$4,500
Total prize money				$100,000

== Notes ==
Preceded by 2013	2014 Travelers All-Star Curling Skins Game; January 11–12	Succeeded by 2015
