= 2017 Pinty's All-Star Curling Skins Game =

- Host city: Banff, Alberta
- Arena: The Fenlands Banff Recreation Centre
- Dates: February 3–5
- Men's winner: Kevin Koe
- Curling club: The Glencoe Club, Calgary, Alberta
- Skip: Kevin Koe
- Third: Marc Kennedy
- Second: Brent Laing
- Lead: Ben Hebert
- Finalist: Brad Jacobs
- Women's winner: Jennifer Jones
- Curling club: St. Vital Curling Club, Winnipeg, Manitoba
- Skip: Jennifer Jones
- Third: Kaitlyn Lawes
- Second: Jill Officer
- Lead: Dawn McEwen
- Finalist: Val Sweeting

The 2017 Pinty's All-Star Curling Skins Game was held from February 3 to 5 at The Fenlands Banff Recreation Centre in Banff, Alberta.

== Men ==
=== Teams ===
Team Jacobs

Soo Curlers Association, Sault Ste. Marie, Ontario

Skip: Brad Jacobs
Third: Ryan Fry
Second: E. J. Harnden
Lead: Ryan Harnden

Team McEwen

Fort Rouge Curling Club, Winnipeg, Manitoba

Skip: Mike McEwen
Third: B. J. Neufeld
Second: Matt Wozniak
Lead: Denni Neufeld

Team Koe

The Glencoe Club, Calgary, Alberta

Skip: Kevin Koe
Third: Marc Kennedy
Second: Brent Laing
Lead: Ben Hebert

Team Edin

Karlstads Curlingklubb, Karlstad, Sweden

Skip Niklas Edin
Third Oskar Eriksson
Second Rasmus Wranå
Lead Christoffer Sundgren

=== Results ===
All times listed in Mountain Standard Time.

==== Semifinals ====
Edin vs. Koe

Saturday, February 4, 9:00 am

Values (CAD)	$1000	$1000	$1500	$1500	$2000	$3000	$4500	$6500	$21,000
Team	1	2	3	4	5	6	7	8	Total
Niklas Edin		$	$				X		$3,500
Kevin Koe 🔨	X			$	X	$		$	$17,500

Jacobs vs. McEwen

Saturday, February 4, 5:00 pm

Values (CAD)	$1000	$1000	$1500	$1500	$2000	$3000	$4500	$6500	$21,000
Team	1	2	3	4	5	6	7	8	Total
Brad Jacobs 🔨			$	$	$		$		$12,500
Mike McEwen	$	$				X		$	$8,500

==== Final ====
Sunday, February 5, 1:00 pm

Values (CAD)	$2000	$2000	$3000	$3000	$4000	$6000	$9000	$13000		$42000
Team	1	2	3	4	5	6	7	8	Button	Total
Kevin Koe	$		$	$		$		X	$	$42,000
Brad Jacobs 🔨		X			X		X			$0

=== Winnings ===
The prize winnings for each team are listed below:

Skip	Semifinal	Final	Bonus	Total
Kevin Koe	$17,500	$42,000	$16,000 (Note: Winner bonus) (Note: The winner of the draw to the button challenge receives a bonus of $1,000.)	$75,500
Brad Jacobs	$12,500	$0		$12,500
Mike McEwen	$8,500			$8,500
Niklas Edin	$3,500			$3,500
Total prize money				$100,000

== Women's ==
=== Teams ===
Team Carey

The Glencoe Club, Calgary, Alberta

Skip: Chelsea Carey
Third: Amy Nixon
Second: Jocelyn Peterman
Lead: Laine Peters

Team Jones

St. Vital Curling Club, Winnipeg, Manitoba

Skip: Jennifer Jones
Third: Kaitlyn Lawes
Second: Jill Officer
Lead: Dawn McEwen

Team Sweeting

Saville Sports Centre, Edmonton, Alberta

Skip: Val Sweeting
Third: Lori Olson-Johns
Second: Dana Ferguson
Lead: Rachelle Brown

Team Muirhead

Dunkeld Curling Club, Pitlochry, Scotland

Skip: Eve Muirhead
Third: Anna Sloan
Second: Vicki Adams
Lead: Lauren Gray

=== Results ===
All times listed in Mountain Standard Time

==== Semifinals ====
Carey vs. Jones

Friday, February 3, 6:00 pm

Values (CAD)	$1000	$1000	$1500	$1500	$2000	$3000	$4500	$6500		$21,000
Team	1	2	3	4	5	6	7	8	Button	Total
Jennifer Jones	$	$		$		X	$		$	$11,000
Chelsea Carey🔨			$		$			$		$10,000

Muirhead vs. Sweeting

Saturday, February 4, 1:00 pm

Values (CAD)	$1000	$1000	$1500	$1500	$2000	$3000	$4500	$6500		$21,000
Team	1	2	3	4	5	6	7	8	Button	Total
Eve Muirhead				$		X		X		$1,500
Val Sweeting 🔨	X	$	$		$		$		$	$19,500

==== Final ====
Jones vs Sweeting

Sunday, February 5, 9:00 am

Values (CAD)	$2000	$2000	$3000	$3000	$4000	$6000	$9000	$13000	$42,000
Team	1	2	3	4	5	6	7	8	Total
Jennifer Jones			$		X	$		$	$26,000
Val Sweeting 🔨	$	$		$			$		$16,000

=== Winnings ===
The prize winnings for each team are listed below:

Skip	Semifinal	Final	Bonus	Total
Jennifer Jones	$11,000	$26,000	$16,000	$53,000
Val Sweeting	$19,500	$16,000		$35,500
Chelsea Carey	$10,000			$10,000
Eve Muirhead	$1,500			$1,500
Total prize money				$100,000
