= 2019 TSN All-Star Curling Skins Game =

- Host city: Banff, Alberta
- Arena: The Fenlands Banff Recreation Centre
- Dates: February 1–3
- Men's winner: Team Bottcher
- Curling club: Saville Community Sports Centre
- Skip: Brendan Bottcher
- Third: Darren Moulding
- Second: Bradley Thiessen
- Lead: Karrick Martin
- Finalist: Kevin Koe
- Women's winner: Team Jones
- Curling club: St. Vital Curling Club
- Skip: Jennifer Jones
- Third: Kaitlyn Lawes
- Second: Jocelyn Peterman
- Lead: Dawn McEwen
- Finalist: Tracy Fleury

The 2019 TSN All-Star Curling Skins Game was held from February 1 to 3 at The Fenlands Banff Recreation Centre in Banff, Alberta. Brendan Bottcher defeated Kevin Koe in the men's final and Jennifer Jones defeated Tracy Fleury in the women's final.

== Men ==
=== Teams ===
Team Gushue

Skip: Brad Gushue
Third: Mark Nichols
Second: Brett Gallant
Lead: Geoff Walker

Team Koe

Skip: Kevin Koe
Third: B. J. Neufeld
Second: Colton Flasch
Lead: Ben Hebert

Team Carruthers

Fourth: Mike McEwen
Skip: Reid Carruthers
Second: Derek Samagalski
Lead: Colin Hodgson

Team Bottcher

Skip: Brendan Bottcher
Third: Darren Moulding
Second: Bradley Thiessen
Lead: Karrick Martin

=== Results ===
All times listed in Mountain Standard Time.

==== Semifinals ====
Gushue vs. Bottcher

Friday, February 1, 6:00 pm

Values (CAD)	$1000	$1000	$1500	$1500	$2000	$3000	$4500	$6500	$21,000
Team	1	2	3	4	5	6	7	8	Total
Brad Gushue			$	$		X		$	$9,500
Brendan Bottcher 🔨	X	$			$		$		$11,500

Koe vs. Carruthers

Saturday, February 2, 1:00 pm

Values (CAD)	$1000	$1000	$1500	$1500	$2000	$3000	$4500	$6500	$21,000
Team	1	2	3	4	5	6	7	8	Total
Kevin Koe 🔨	X		X		$	$		$	$21,000
Reid Carruthers		X		X			X		$0

==== Final ====
Sunday, February 3, 1:00 pm

Values (CAD)	$2000	$2000	$3000	$3000	$4000	$6000	$9000	$13000		$42,000
Team	1	2	3	4	5	6	7	8	Button	Total
Brendan Bottcher 🔨	X		X	$			$		$	$28,000
Kevin Koe		$			$	$		X		$14,000

=== Winnings ===
The prize winnings for each team are listed below:

Skip	Semifinal	Final	Bonus	Total
Brendan Bottcher	$11,500	$28,000	$15,000 (Note: Winner bonus)	$54,500
Kevin Koe	$21,000	14,000	$1,000 (Note: The winner of the draw to the button challenge receives a bonus of $1,000.)	$36,000
Brad Gushue	$9,500			$9,500
Reid Carruthers	$0			$0
Total prize money				$100,000

== Women ==
=== Teams ===
Team Jones

Skip: Jennifer Jones
Third: Kaitlyn Lawes
Second: Jocelyn Peterman
Lead: Dawn McEwen

Team Einarson

Skip: Kerri Einarson
Third: Val Sweeting
Second: Shannon Birchard
Lead: Briane Meilleur

Team Scheidegger

Skip: Casey Scheidegger
Third: Cary-Anne McTaggart
Second: Jessie Haughian
Lead: Kristie Moore

Team Fleury

Skip: Tracy Fleury
Third: Selena Njegovan
Second: Liz Fyfe
Lead: Kristin MacCuish

=== Results ===
All times listed in Mountain Standard Time.

==== Semifinals ====
Einarson vs. Fleury

Saturday, February 2, 9:00 am

Values (CAD)	$1000	$1000	$1500	$1500	$2000	$3000	$4500	$6500		$21,000
Team	1	2	3	4	5	6	7	8	Button	Total
Kerri Einarson 🔨	$			$		$		X		$7,500
Tracy Fleury		X	$		X		X		$	$13,500

Jones vs. Scheidegger

Saturday, February 2, 5:00 pm

Values (CAD)	$1000	$1000	$1500	$1500	$2000	$3000	$4500	$6500	$21,000
Team	1	2	3	4	5	6	7	8	Total
Jennifer Jones 🔨		X	$		X		$		$12,000
Casey Scheidegger	$			$		X		$	$9,000

==== Final ====
Sunday, February 3, 9:00 am

Values (CAD)	$2000	$2000	$3000	$3000	$4000	$6000	$9000	$13000	$42,000
Team	1	2	3	4	5	6	7	8	Total
Tracy Fleury			$	$	$		$		$19,000
Jennifer Jones 🔨	$	$				$		$	$23,000

=== Winnings ===
The prize winnings for each team are listed below:

Skip	Semifinal	Final	Bonus	Total
Jennifer Jones	$12,000	$23,000	$16,000	$51,000
Tracy Fleury	$13,500	$19,000		$32,500
Casey Scheidegger	$9,000			$9,000
Kerri Einarson	$7,500			$7,500
Total prize money				$100,000
