= 2010 Casino Rama Curling Skins Game =

The 2010 Casino Rama Curling Skins Game on TSN was held on January 16 and 17 at the Casino Rama Entertainment Centre in Rama, Ontario. The total purse for the event was CAD$100,000.

Four teams were invited to participate. They played one semi-final each on January 16, with the winners playing in the final on January 17.

== Teams ==
=== Team Ferbey ===
Saville Sports Centre, Edmonton, Alberta

- Fourth: Wayne Middaugh (in place for David Nedohin)
- Skip: Randy Ferbey
- Second: Scott Pfeifer
- Lead: Marcel Rocque

=== Team Howard ===
Coldwater and District Curling Club, Coldwater, Ontario

- Skip: Glenn Howard
- Third: Richard Hart
- Second: Brent Laing
- Lead: Craig Savill

=== Team Martin ===
Saville Sports Centre, Edmonton, Alberta

- Skip: Kevin Martin
- Third: John Morris
- Second: Marc Kennedy
- Lead: Ben Hebert

=== Team Murdoch ===
Lockerbie Curling Club, Lockerbie, Scotland

- Skip: David Murdoch
- Third: Ewan MacDonald
- Second: Pete Smith
- Lead: Euan Byers

== Draw to the button ==
Kevin Martin won the Draw Shot Challenge, receiving a bonus of $1,000.

== Games ==
Semi-final dollar amounts

- 1st & 2nd end: $1000
- 3rd & 4th end: $1500
- 5th end: $2000
- 6th end: $3000
- 7th end: $4500
- 8th end: $6500

=== Ferbey vs. Howard ===
January 16, 1:00pm EST

Team	1	2	3	4	5	6	7	8	Final
Howard	-	-	$	-	$	-	-	-	$7000
Ferbey	-	-	-	-	-	$	-	$	$14000

=== Martin vs. Murdoch ===
January 16, 8:00pm EST

Team	1	2	3	4	5	6	7	8	*	Final
Martin	$	-	-	-	$	-	$	-	-	$7500
Murdoch	-	$	$	$	-	$	-	-	$	$13500

=== Final ===
January 17, 1:00pm EST

Final game dollar amounts

- 1st & 2nd end: $2000
- 3rd & 4th end: $3000
- 5th end: $4000
- 6th end: $6000
- 7th end: $9000
- 8th end: $13000

+ $15000 bonus for the winner

Team	1	2	3	4	5	6	7	8	Final
Ferbey	-	-	-	-	-	-	-	-	$0
Murdoch	$	$	-	-	$	$	-	$	$57,000

Preceded by 2009	2010 Casino Rama Curling Skins Game; January 16–17	Succeeded by 2011
