= Dominion of Canada General Insurance Company =

Former Canadian insurance company

The Dominion of Canada General Insurance Company
- Industry: Insurance
- Founded: 1887
- Defunct: November 1, 2013
- Fate: Acquired by The Travelers Companies
- Successor: Travelers Canada

The Dominion of Canada General Insurance Company Crest

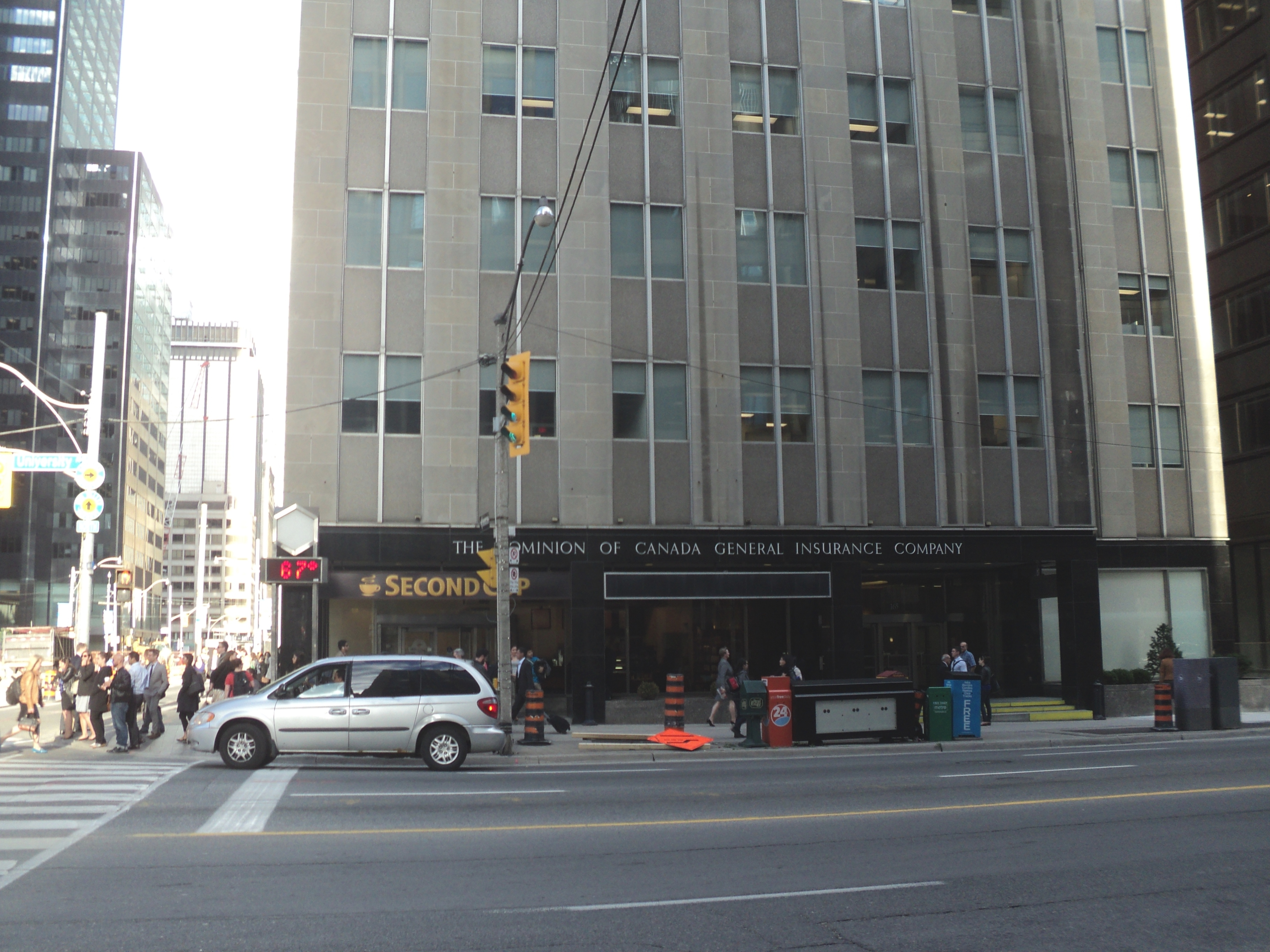
Dominion General Insurance building in Toronto.

The Dominion of Canada General Insurance Company, operating as The Dominion, was a Canadian general insurance company in operation from 1887 to 2013. The Dominion’s head office was in Toronto and the company had various offices across Canada.

The Dominion’s first president was Sir John A. Macdonald, Canada's first prime minister. In 2009, the company created the first championship for club curlers in Canada, known as The Dominion Curling Club Championship. In 2013, the Dominion was acquired by US insurer The Travelers Companies. Upon completion of the acquisition on November 1, it became part of Travelers' subsidiary Travelers Canada. The final Chief Executive Officer was Brigid Murphy, who then became President and CEO of the new Travelers Canada.

== See also ==
- John A. Macdonald
- The Dominion Curling Club Championship
