= Lisa Weagle =

Canadian curler (born 1985)

- Curler
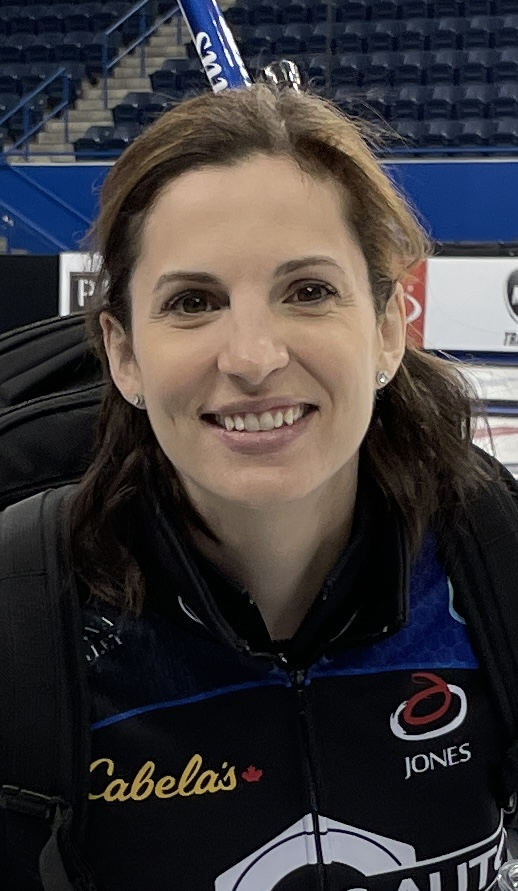
- Weagle at the 2022 Players' Championship
- Born: Lisa Colleen Weagle; March 24, 1985 (age 41); Ottawa, Ontario, Canada
- Height: 172 cm (5 ft 8 in)

Team
- Curling club: Ottawa CC; Ottawa, ON
- Mixed doubles partner: John Epping

Curling career
- Member Association: Ontario (1999–2020); Manitoba (2020–2022); Quebec (2024–present)
- Hearts: 9 (2011, 2013, 2014, 2015, 2017, 2019, 2020, 2021, 2025)
- World Championship: 3 (2013, 2014, 2017)
- Olympic: 2 (2018, 2022)
- Top CTRS ranking: 1st (2012–13, 2015–16, 2016–17, 2018–19)
- Grand Slam victories: 10 (2012 Masters, 2013 Masters, 2015 Masters, 2015 National, 2015 Canadian Open, 2017 Champions Cup, 2018 Champions Cup, 2018 Tour Challenge, 2018 National, 2019 Canadian Open)
Medal record
Women's curling
Representing Canada
World Curling Championships
Gold medal – first place	2017 Beijing
Silver medal – second place	2014 Saint John
Bronze medal – third place	2013 Riga
Scotties Tournament of Hearts
Gold medal – first place	2014 Montreal
Bronze medal – third place	2015 Moose Jaw
Representing Manitoba
Canadian Olympic Curling Trials
Gold medal – first place	2021 Saskatoon
Representing Ontario
Canadian Olympic Curling Trials
Gold medal – first place	2017 Ottawa
Bronze medal – third place	2013 Winnipeg
Canadian Mixed Doubles Olympic Trials
Bronze medal – third place	2025 Liverpool
Scotties Tournament of Hearts
Gold medal – first place	2013 Kingston
Gold medal – first place	2017 St Catharines
Silver medal – second place	2019 Sydney
Silver medal – second place	2020 Moose Jaw

Lisa Colleen Weagle OLY (born March 24, 1985) is a Canadian curler from Ottawa, Ontario. Weagle was the lead on the Rachel Homan team from 2010 until March 12, 2020, when the team announced they would be parting ways with her. She then joined Team Jennifer Jones for two seasons until the team disbanded on March 15, 2022. She then played lead for the 2024–25 season Team Laurie St-Georges from Quebec.

Weagle was known for her ability to make the eponymous "Weagle" shot (also known as a tick shot), which the Homan rink had used in high frequency while she was a member of the team.

In 2023, she coached the Kaitlyn Lawes rink.

== Career ==
Weagle began curling at the age of 8 at the Granite Curling Club of West Ottawa. In her youth, she won the 2000 Ontario bantam girls curling championship playing second for the Lee Merklinger rink.

=== Joining Homan (2010–2012) ===
In Weagle's first year with her new rink, the Homan team qualified and won the 2011 Ontario Scotties Tournament of Hearts. At the 2011 Scotties Tournament of Hearts, the Ontario team had a 4th-place finish. She finished the round robin in 3rd place and lost in the bronze medal game to Nova Scotia's Heather Smith-Dacey after previously beating her in the 3 vs. 4 game. A semi-final loss to Saskatchewan's Amber Holland eliminated her from the finals.

In April 2011, the team made it to their first Grand Slam final of their careers, when she lost to Jennifer Jones in the final of the 2011 Players' Championship. Later that year, she would play in her first Canada Cup, where her team finished with a 2–4 record.

Weagle again qualified for the provincial Scotties Tournament of Hearts in 2012. Her team went undefeated throughout the round robin. However, the team would be bested in the final by Tracy Horgan's rink from Sudbury. Homan, who was up one with hammer, missed a draw to the button to clinch the victory on her final rock. Instead, she gave up three and lost.

=== Scotties champions and world bronze medallists (2012–2013) ===
The 2012–13 curling season was Weagle's most successful to date on the World Curling Tour. In her first Grand Slam event of the season, the 2012 Curlers Corner Autumn Gold Curling Classic, her team lost to Sherry Middaugh in the final. In the second Grand Slam event of the season, the 2012 Manitoba Lotteries Women's Curling Classic, Homan's rink once again lost in the final, this time to Stefanie Lawton. The team lost in the semi-final of the third Slam, the 2012 Colonial Square Ladies Classic but followed it up with her first-ever Grand Slam victory at the 2012 Masters of Curling where she beat Chelsea Carey in the final. Outside of the Grand Slams, Weagle won her the Royal LePage OVCA Women's Fall Classic. Later in the season, she qualified for her second Scotties Tournament of Hearts by going undefeated at the 2013 Ontario Scotties Tournament of Hearts. The Homan rink tore through the competition representing Ontario at the 2013 Scotties Tournament of Hearts in Kingston, Ontario. The team lost just one game to Manitoba's Jennifer Jones. This gave the rink a 10–1 record, 2nd behind Manitoba, who went undefeated. However, in their first playoff game against Jones, the Homan rink made amends by defeating Jones 8–5. This put the Homan team in the final, where they faced Jones again, and this time would beat them again by a score of 9–6. With the win, the Homan rink becomes the first Ottawa-based team to win the Canadian women's curling championship. The win earned Weagle and her team the right to represent Canada at the 2013 World Women's Curling Championship in Riga, Latvia. At the World championships, the Homan rink led Canada to an 8–3 round robin finish, which put them in third place. In the playoffs, they beat the United States (skipped by Erika Brown) in the 3 vs. 4 game, but they then lost to Scotland (skipped by Eve Muirhead in the semi-final, after Homan missed her last shot of the game, jamming a double takeout. After the loss, Homan would beat the Americans again, this time in the bronze medal game. The Homan rink wrapped up the season by losing in the quarter-final of the 2013 Players' Championship.

=== Scotties repeat champions and world silver medallists (2013–14) ===
The defending Canadian champion Homan rink had a less successful start to their season in 2013–14. The team failed to win the World Curling Tour event until winning the 2013 Masters, where she beat Muirhead in the final. Until this point, Muirhead's rink had Homan's number, having also defeated her team in the semi-finals of the 2013 Curlers Corner Autumn Gold Curling Classic. Having made the playoffs in every Grand Slam event in 2012–13, the team failed to make the playoffs at the 2013 Colonial Square Ladies Classic.

Homan's success over the last couple of seasons qualified her team for an automatic entry at the 2013 Canadian Olympic Curling Trials. At the Trials, the team sneaked into the playoffs with a 4–3 round robin record, which was good enough for second place. However, in the event's semi-final, the team would be defeated by Sherry Middaugh, ending the team's 2014 Olympic hopes.

As defending Scotties champions from 2013, the Homan rink earned the right to represent Team Canada at the 2014 Scotties Tournament of Hearts in Montreal. The event was notable for the absence of the Jennifer Jones rink who was competing at the Olympics. Nevertheless, the Homan team went through the entire tournament without a single loss, defeating Alberta's Val Sweeting in the final.

Homan's 2014 Scotties win earned her team a berth at the 2014 Ford World Women's Curling Championship in Saint John, New Brunswick. The team had a better event than the previous worlds, as they only lost one round robin game to finish first place heading into the playoffs. The team defeated Switzerland's Binia Feltscher in the 1 vs. 2 Page playoff game but were unable to beat them again when they faced each other in the final match. Weagle and the rest of her Canadian team thus had to settle for a silver medal.

The Homan rink ended the season with a loss in the final of the 2014 Players' Championship against the Olympic gold medalist Jennifer Jones. The match marked the last game for second Alison Kreviazuk on the team, as she moved to Sweden to be with her boyfriend Fredrik Lindberg, who plays for Niklas Edin. Kreviazuk was replaced by Joanne Courtney from Edmonton.

=== Joanne Courtney joins the team (2014–2017) ===
The Homan rink found less success in the 2014–15 curling season after adding new second, Joanne Courtney, to the team. The team did not win any Slam events, losing in the finals of the 2014 Curlers Corner Autumn Gold Curling Classic (against Jennifer Jones) and the 2014 Canadian Open of Curling (against Eve Muirhead). The team also lost in the final of the 2014 Canada Cup of Curling against Val Sweeting. As defending champions, the team represented Team Canada at the 2015 Scotties Tournament of Hearts. The team nearly missed the playoffs but won their final round-robin game against Tracy Horgan to finish the round robin in 4th place with a 7–4 record. In the playoffs, they would lose to Saskatchewan's Stefanie Lawton in the 3 vs. 4 game but rebounded in the bronze medal game in a re-match against the Lawton rink, beating them 7–5. That season, the team would win one World Curling Tour event, the Pomeroy Inn & Suites Prairie Showdown held in March. That season, the team also won the inaugural 2016 Women's All-Star Curling Skins Game, taking home $52,000.

The team found much more success in the 2015–16 curling season but were still wrought with some disappointment. They began the season with a win in the Stu Sells Oakville Tankard, followed by a loss in the first Slam, the 2015 GSOC Tour Challenge against Switzerland's Silvana Tirinzoni. The team then went on to win six Tour events in a row, the Stockholm Ladies Cup, the Curlers Corner Autumn Gold Curling Classic (no longer a Slam), the 2015 Masters of Curling, the 2015 National, the 2015 Canada Cup of Curling and the 2015 Canadian Open of Curling, amassing a huge lead in both the World Curling Tour Order of Merit and Money standings in the process. After this impressive run, the team's success seemed to dry up. They were upset in the finals of the 2016 Ontario Scotties Tournament of Hearts against their club mates, the Jenn Hanna team, meaning the World #1 ranked Homan team would not be able to play in the national championships that year. The team was invited to play in the 2016 Elite 10 men's Grand Slam event, making history in the process. The team would only win one game in the event, though, beating Charley Thomas' team. The team ended the season losing against Jennifer Jones in the final of the 2016 Humpty's Champions Cup. The Homan rink's success over the course of the season meant the team would end the season ranked number one in the world in both the Women's money list and order of merit standings.

The 2016–17 curling season was one of Weagle's best seasons to date. Her team began the season winning their first event, the 2016 AMJ Campbell Shorty Jenkins Classic. They followed this up by winning the 2016 Canad Inns Women's Classic the following month. A week later, the team lost in the final of the 2016 Masters of Curling against the Allison Flaxey rink. A month later, they lost in the final of the 2016 Canada Cup of Curling. In playdown play, the rink struggled in the round robin of the 2017 Ontario Scotties Tournament of Hearts, losing two games, and finishing second behind Jacqueline Harrison. However, they won both their playoff matches, including defeating Harrison in the final, qualifying the team to represent Ontario at that year's Scotties. Team Homan defeated Manitoba's Michelle Englot to win the 2017 Scotties, her third Scotties title in four years. She won in an extra end in what many considered one of the most exciting Scotties finals ever. Both teams went 10–1 in the round robin, with Homan's lone loss coming at Englot's expense. Englot beat Homan once again in the 1 vs. 2 game, forcing Homan to beat Northern Ontario (Krista McCarville) in the semifinal to force the re-match against Englot. At the 2017 world championship in Beijing, Homan's rink became only the third in tournament history to go unbeaten in round-robin play, joining fellow Canadian Colleen Jones from 2003 and Sweden's Anette Norberg from 2005. She ended up going unbeaten right to the end, the only team to do so to date, winning the gold medal by beating Anna Sidorova (for the 3rd consecutive time with wins in the round robin, 1–2 playoff game, and final) 8–3 for the gold medal, her first world title and completing her medal set at worlds. The Homan rink finished the season by winning the 2017 Humpty's Champions Cup.

=== Olympic run (2017–2018) ===
Weagle began the 2017-18 curling season by winning the 2017 Prestige Hotels & Resorts Curling Classic and then the Curlers Corner Autumn Gold Curling Classic the following week. Weagle and her team won the 2017 Canadian Olympic Curling Trials in her hometown of Ottawa, defeating previously unbeaten Chelsea Carey. The Homan rink had lost just one game in the tournament against Carey in the round robin. After her Trials win, the Homan rink began to struggle. The team would then play at the 2018 Winter Olympics, where they started disastrously. Losing to the team from Denmark meant that Canada was 0-3 for the first time at an Olympics. The game against Denmark was marked with controversy when Denmark burned a rock as it was coming to a rest. Rather than letting the rock be adjusted, Weagle's skip Homan removed the stone. Joan McCusker commentating for CBC at the Olympics said of Homan's move that "I think that was a rash move to take it off. They should have left it in play. It doesn't look good on you." Weagle and team would win their next three to stay in the fight for the medals but would lose their next two, with their fifth loss against Eve Muirhead officially eliminating them from medal contention. This made Homan's team the first Canadian Olympic curlers not to play for or win a medal. They won the final event of the year, the 2018 Humpty's Champions Cup.

=== Post Olympics (2018–2020) ===
Team Homan's 2018-19 curling season began by winning the first leg of the Curling World Cup, defeating Sweden's Anna Hasselborg in the final. Hasselborg got the best of Homan the following month, beating her in the final of the 2018 Masters. Homan then went on to win the next grand slam event, the 2018 Tour Challenge, defeating Tracy Fleury in the final. The Homan rink struggled at the 2018 Canada Cup, going 5–2 in the round robin, and losing in the semifinal to Jennifer Jones. The team rebounded a week later to win the 2018 National, beating Kerri Einarson in the final. The following month, Homan won her third Grand Slam of the season, the 2019 Meridian Canadian Open, defeating Silvana Tirinzoni in the final. Weagle and her rink played in the 2019 Ontario Scotties Tournament of Hearts, having missed the previous year's event due to the Olympics and having won the 2017 Scotties). The team lost just one game en route to their fourth provincial title at the event. However, controversy brewed due to an incident of bullying aimed at Homan. A "number of curlers" at the event voted for her to win the tournament's sportsmanship award to protest the fact that the team had two members (Homan and Courtney) living in Alberta (teams are only allowed one "import" player from out of province, however, Homan maintains a residence in Ontario and is exempted from requirements as she is a full-time student at the University of Alberta). At the 2019 Scotties Tournament of Hearts her team finished the round robin at 5-2 as third seed. The team qualified for the final beating Northern Ontario's Krista McCarville and Saskatchewan's Robyn Silvernagle but eventually finished as runner-up, losing the final to Alberta's Chelsea Carey in an extra end despite leading 5–1 in the fourth end. At the 2019 Players' Championship, the team struggled and ended up missing the playoffs after posting a 2-3 round robin record and losing the tie-breaker to Satsuki Fujisawa. They finished the season with a semi-final finish at the 2019 Champions Cup.

In their first event of the 2019–20 season, Team Homan had a semi-final finish at the 2019 AMJ Campbell Shorty Jenkins Classic. They followed it up by winning the 2019 Colonial Square Ladies Classic. The team would appear in another final in mid-October at the 2019 Canad Inns Women's Classic, where they lost to Elena Stern. They missed the playoffs at all four Slams of the season as both the Players' Championship, and the Champions Cup were cancelled due to the COVID-19 pandemic. Team Homan would win the first spot in the 2021 Canadian Olympic Curling Trials by defeating Tracy Fleury in the final of the 2019 Canada Cup. The team went undefeated at the 2020 Ontario Scotties Tournament of Hearts, defeating Hollie Duncan in the final. At the 2020 Scotties Tournament of Hearts, they would win their second straight silver medal, losing the final this year to Manitoba's Kerri Einarson. Weagle was named the All-Star Lead for the tournament. It would be their last event of the season as both the Players' Championship and the Champions Cup Grand Slam events were also cancelled due to the COVID-19 pandemic. Team Homan announced on March 12, 2020, that the team was parting ways with Weagle.

=== Team Jones (2020–2022) ===
On March 18, 2020, Team Jennifer Jones announced that Weagle would join the team of Jones, Kaitlyn Lawes, Jocelyn Peterman, and Dawn McEwen in a five-player rotation. Weagle played for the team when they won their lone event of the abbreviated 2020–21 season at the 2020 Stu Sells Oakville Tankard. The 2021 Manitoba Scotties were cancelled due to the COVID-19 pandemic in Manitoba, so Curl Manitoba appointed the Jones rink to represent Manitoba at the 2021 Scotties Tournament of Hearts. A pregnant Dawn McEwen opted to stay at home, allowing Weagle to be the full-time lead on the team. At the 2021 Hearts, the team finished with a 9–3 record, putting them in a third place tiebreaker match against Alberta, skipped by Laura Walker. Alberta defeated Manitoba 9–8 to advance to the semifinal. Weagle shot 90% at the tournament (the highest out of all players) and was named to the first all-star team as a result. A month later, Weagle was back in the bubble to compete with her mixed doubles partner John Epping at the 2021 Canadian Mixed Doubles Curling Championship. The pair qualified for the playoffs with a 5–1 record and defeated Val Sweeting and Marc Kennedy in the round of 12. They then lost to Laura Walker and Kirk Muyres in the round of 8, eliminating them from contention. Weagle ended her season with Team Jones at the only two Grand Slam events of the abbreviated season, also held in the Calgary bubble. The team missed the playoffs at both the 2021 Champions Cup and the 2021 Players' Championship.

Team Jones qualified for the playoffs in each of their first four tour events; however, they were not able to qualify for any finals. At the first Grand Slam of the season, the 2021 Masters, the team was able to reach the final before losing to Tracy Fleury in a 9–7 match. They then missed the playoffs at the 2021 National two weeks later.

A month later, Team Jones competed in the 2021 Canadian Olympic Curling Trials. There, the team posted a 5–3 round robin record, earning a spot in the semifinal. They then defeated Krista McCarville to qualify for the final, where they would face Fleury again. After a tight game all the way through, Team Fleury stole one in the ninth end to take a single-point lead. In the tenth end, Jones had an open hit-and-stick to win the game; however, her shooter rolled too far, and she only got one. This sent the game to an extra end. On her final shot, Fleury attempted a soft-weight hit on a Jones stone partially buried behind a guard. Her rock, however, curled too much and hit the guard, giving up a steal of one and the game to Team Jones. After the game, Jones said that "We're there to pick each other up when you miss, not everybody can say that and that's really a big strength of our team." With the win, Team Jones travelled to Beijing, China to represent Canada at the 2022 Winter Olympics. Through the round robin, the Canadian team had mixed results, ultimately finishing tied for third with a 5–4 record. However, because of their draw shot challenge results, which were the lowest of the teams they were tied with, they ranked fifth overall, missing the playoffs.

On March 15, 2022, Team Jones announced they would be parting ways after the 2021–22 season. Weagle later announced that she would be focusing solely on mixed doubles for the 2022–23 season.

Team Jones still had two more events together before parting ways, the 2022 Players' Championship and 2022 Champions Cup Grand Slams. At the Players', the team went 1–3, missing the playoffs. They then missed the playoffs again at the Champions Cup with a 1–4 record, ending the team's run together.

=== Mixed doubles (2022–present) ===
Since 2022, Weagle has focused primarily on mixed doubles curling with partner John Epping. The pair lost in the quarterfinals of the 2023 Canadian Mixed Doubles Curling Championship to Jennifer Jones and Brent Laing. At the 2024 Canadian Mixed Doubles Curling Championship, she and Epping lost in the qualification playoff game to Nancy Martin and Steve Laycock. Weagle and Epping qualified for the 2025 Canadian Mixed Doubles Curling Olympic Trials, where they finished third, losing 8-6 in the semifinals to Rachel Homan and Brendan Bottcher.

== Personal life ==
Weagle formerly worked for the Department of Canadian Heritage in Hull, Quebec as a communications advisor for Sport Canada. She also worked as a director of communications for Syntax Strategic. Currently, she is the founder and head coach of the Lisa Weagle Curling Academy. Weagle graduated from the University of Ottawa in 2008 with a communications degree. She earned a Certificate in Business from the Smith School of Business at Queen's University, Kingston in 2020. Her sister is curler Julia Weagle, her mother is author Brenda Chapman, and her father is Ted. Weagle is married to Robin Guy.

In March 2023, Weagle was named as Canada's chef de mission at the 2024 Winter Youth Olympics.

In 2024, she was inducted into the Order of Ottawa.

== Teams ==
Season	Skip	Third	Second	Lead	Notes	Tour earnings (rank) (CAD)	Coach
1999–00	Lee Merklinger	Leslie Levere	Lisa Weagle	Breanne Merklinger			
2001–02	Lee Merklinger	Leslie Levere	Lisa Weagle	Breanne Merklinger			
2004–05	Lee Merklinger	Leslie Levere	Lisa Weagle	Breanne Merklinger		$1,150 (93rd)	
2008–09	Jenn Hanna	Steph Hanna	Lee Merklinger	Lisa Weagle			
2009–10	Robyn Mattie	Anna Piekarski	Lisa Weagle	Julia Weagle		$200 (T90th)	
2010–11	Rachel Homan	Emma Miskew	Alison Kreviazuk	Lisa Weagle	Alternate Sherry Middaugh for Scotties	$27,300 (8th)	Andrea Ronnebeck
2011–12	Rachel Homan	Emma Miskew	Alison Kreviazuk	Lisa Weagle		$8,800 (26th)	Andrea Ronnebeck
2012–13	Rachel Homan	Emma Miskew	Alison Kreviazuk	Lisa Weagle	Alternate Stephanie LeDrew for Scotties and Worlds	$60,800 (1st)	Earle Morris
2013–14	Rachel Homan	Emma Miskew	Alison Kreviazuk	Lisa Weagle	Alternate Heather Smith for Olympic Trials; Alternate Stephanie LeDrew for Scotties and Worlds	$51,900 (4th)	Earle Morris
2014–15	Rachel Homan	Emma Miskew	Joanne Courtney	Lisa Weagle	Alternate Cheryl Kreviazuk for Scotties	$91,608 (1st)	Richard Hart
2015–16	Rachel Homan	Emma Miskew	Joanne Courtney	Lisa Weagle		$183,754 (1st)	Marcel Rocque; Richard Hart
2016–17	Rachel Homan	Emma Miskew	Joanne Courtney	Lisa Weagle	Alternate Cheryl Kreviazuk for Scotties and Worlds; Sarah Wilkes in for Courtney at 2017 Humpty's Champions Cup	$132,500 (1st)	Adam Kingsbury
2017–18	Rachel Homan	Emma Miskew	Joanne Courtney	Lisa Weagle	Alternate Cheryl Kreviazuk for Olympic Trials; Alternate Cheryl Bernard for Olympics	$43,500 (13th)	Adam Kingsbury
2018–19	Rachel Homan	Emma Miskew	Joanne Courtney	Lisa Weagle	Alternate Cheryl Kreviazuk for Scotties; Substitute Laura Walker at the 2019 Players' Championship; Jolene Campbell in for Courtney at the 2019 Champions Cup	$181,848 (1st)	Marcel Rocque
2019–20	Rachel Homan	Emma Miskew	Joanne Courtney	Lisa Weagle	Alternate Cheryl Kreviazuk for Scotties	$35,300 (13th)	Marcel Rocque
2020–21	Jennifer Jones	Kaitlyn Lawes	Jocelyn Peterman	Dawn McEwen / Lisa Weagle	5 player team; Alternate Raunora Westcott for Hearts	$9,000 (NR) (Note: Due to the COVID-19 pandemic, there was no official money ranking for this season. Team Jones won $3,000 at the Champions Cup and $6,000 at the Players' Championship.)	Viktor Kjäll
2021–22	Jennifer Jones	Kaitlyn Lawes	Jocelyn Peterman	Dawn McEwen / Lisa Weagle			Viktor Kjäll
2024–25	Laurie St-Georges	Jamie Sinclair	Emily Riley	Lisa Weagle			François Roberge
