= Dawn McEwen =

Canadian curler

- Curler
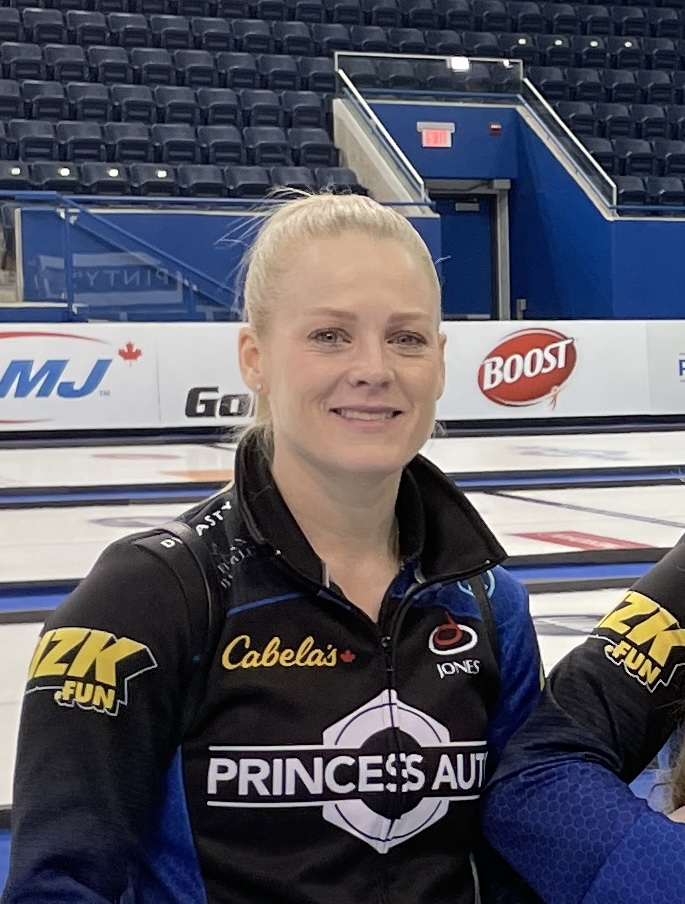
- McEwen at the 2022 Players' Championship
- Other names: Dawn Kathleen McEwen
- Born: Dawn Kathleen Askin; July 3, 1980 (age 46); Ottawa, Ontario, Canada
- Height: 162 cm (5 ft 4 in)

Team
- Curling club: Ottawa CC, Ottawa; St. Vital CC, Winnipeg, MB

Curling career
- Member Association: Ontario (2003–2007); Manitoba (2007–2022)
- Hearts: 12 (2005, 2008, 2009, 2010, 2011, 2012, 2013, 2015, 2016, 2018, 2019, 2020)
- World Championship: 5 (2008, 2009, 2010, 2015, 2018)
- Pan Continental Championship: 1 (2023)
- Olympic: 2 (2014, 2022)
- Top CTRS ranking: 1st (2007–08, 2009–10, 2010–11, 2011–12, 2013–14, 2014–15, 2017–18)
- Grand Slam victories: 16 (2007 Autumn Gold, 2007 Players', 2008 Wayden Transportation, 2009 Players', 2009 Autumn Gold, 2010 Sobeys Slam, 2011 Players', 2013 Manitoba Liquor & Lotteries, 2013 Colonial Square, 2014 Players', 2014 Autumn Gold, 2016 Champions Cup, 2017 Players', 2017 Masters, 2017 National, 2024 Tour Challenge)
Medal record
Women's curling
Representing Canada
Winter Olympics
Gold medal – first place	2014 Sochi
World Championships
Gold medal – first place	2008 Vernon
Gold medal – first place	2018 North Bay
Silver medal – second place	2015 Sapporo
Bronze medal – third place	2010 Swift Current
Representing Manitoba
Canadian Olympic Curling Trials
Gold medal – first place	2013 Winnipeg
Gold medal – first place	2021 Saskatoon
Bronze medal – third place	2017 Ottawa
Scotties Tournament of Hearts
Gold medal – first place	2008 Regina
Gold medal – first place	2009 Victoria
Gold medal – first place	2010 Sault Ste. Marie
Gold medal – first place	2015 Moose Jaw
Gold medal – first place	2018 Penticton
Silver medal – second place	2011 Charlottetown
Silver medal – second place	2013 Kingston
Bronze medal – third place	2012 Red Deer
Bronze medal – third place	2016 Grand Prairie
Representing Ontario
Scotties Tournament of Hearts
Silver medal – second place	2005 St. John's
Representing (Manitoba) Team Wild Card
Scotties Tournament of Hearts
Bronze medal – third place	2020 Moose Jaw

Dawn Kathleen McEwen (née Askin; born July 3, 1980) is a Canadian semi-retired curler from Winnipeg, Manitoba. She was the long-time lead for the Jennifer Jones rink, who became Olympic champions, winning gold for Canada at the 2014 Winter Olympics. McEwen is a two-time world champion in curling, having won with Jones at the 2008 World Championships and again at the 2018 World Championships. In 2019, McEwen was named the greatest Canadian female lead in history in a TSN poll of broadcasters, reporters and top curlers.

== Career ==
McEwen was born at the Riverside Hospital in Ottawa, the daughter of Wayne and Jane Askin (née Machin). She grew up in Ottawa, where she began curling at the RCMP Curling Club at age seven, before moving to the Rideau Curling Club for their junior program. After juniors, McEwen joined the Darcie Simpson rink, playing second on the team. The team made it to two straight Ontario women's finals, losing to Sherry Middaugh at the 2002 Ontario Scott Tournament of Hearts, and then to Anne Dunn in the 2003 Ontario Scott Tournament of Hearts. The next season, McEwen joined up with Jenn Hanna playing as her second, and lost in the semifinal of the 2004 Ontario Hearts. McEwen finally won the Ontario Scott Tournament of Hearts when the team won the event in 2005. At the national 2005 Scott Tournament of Hearts, the team made it to the final, where they lost to Jennifer Jones, after Jones made an in-off for the win.

In the 2006–07 season, McEwen was relegated to being the team's alternate so she could focus on her career. In 2007, she moved to Winnipeg and began playing for Jones. She won the Canada Cup with Jones in 2007. McEwen won her second provincial championship (first as a Manitoban) in 2008 and played in her second Tournament of Hearts with Jones, this time as a teammate, winning in the finals against Alberta. She would later win the 2008 World Women's Curling Championship that year with Jones, beating China in the final.

McEwen, together with the Jones team, would reach the final again in the 2009 Scotties Tournament of Hearts, this time as returning champions, and sealed their victory as repeating Canadian champions with a win. They would go to the 2009 World Women's Curling Championship in Korea but would suffer a defeat in the quarter-finals that put them out of the medal contention.

McEwen would continue as lead as the Jones team defended their title as Team Canada at the 2010 Scotties Tournament of Hearts. After tying for the lead in the round robin, the team would play PEI and go straight to the final, where they would have a rematch against PEI. After going down 6–3, the team would come from behind and win in extra ends; this was McEwen's third championship.

McEwen, with the Jones team, won at the 2013 Canadian Olympic Curling Trials, earning the right to represent Canada at the 2014 Winter Olympic Games in Sochi. They became the first and only women's team to go undefeated through the tournament, winning the gold medal.

The team's success continued, winning the 2015 Scotties Tournament of Hearts and winning a silver medal at the 2015 World Women's Curling Championship. In the 2017 Canadian Olympic Curling Trials, Team Jones lost in the semifinal to Rachel Homan, whose team would go on to represent Canada at the 2018 Winter Olympic Games. McEwen, along with her husband and fellow curler Mike McEwen, participated in the 2018 Canadian Mixed Doubles Curling Olympic Trials but did not qualify for playoffs with a 2–6 round robin record.

Following her fifth Scotties title at the 2018 Scotties Tournament of Hearts, McEwen and the Jones team went undefeated at the 2018 World Women's Curling Championship for her second world championship title.

With the addition of Jocelyn Peterman, who replaced Officer at second, the Jones team won the 2018 Canada Cup, defeating Kerri Einarson in the final. They also won the 2019 TSN All-Star Curling Skins Game over Tracy Fleury. At the 2019 Scotties Tournament of Hearts, the team represented Team Canada, but missed playoffs.

In their first event of the 2019-20 season, Team Jones won the 2019 AMJ Campbell Shorty Jenkins Classic, defeating Tracy Fleury in the final. Next, they played in the 2019 Colonial Square Ladies Classic, where Fleury would take them out in the semi-finals. They had two quarterfinal finishes at the first two Slams of the season, the Masters and the Tour Challenge. The team struggled at the Canada Cup, finishing with a 2–4 record. The team made the final at the Boost National, losing to Team Hasselborg, and the quarterfinals at the Canadian Open. The team made the final of the 2020 Manitoba Scotties Tournament of Hearts and lost to Team Einarson. By virtue of their CTRS ranking, the team had a second chance to qualify for the 2020 Scotties Tournament of Hearts through the wild card play-in game, where they defeated Team Fleury to become Team Wild Card. At the Scotties, they finished the round robin and championship pool with a 9–2 record as the second seed in playoffs but lost to Kerri Einarson (Team Manitoba) in the 1 vs. 2 playoff game and to Rachel Homan (Team Ontario) in the semifinal to finish in third place. It would be their last event of the season as both the Players' Championship and the Champions Cup Grand Slam events were also cancelled due to the COVID-19 pandemic. On March 18, 2020, the team announced that Lisa Weagle, after parting ways with Team Homan, would join the team in a 5-player rotation.

McEwen did not play in any events with Team Jones during the abbreviated 2020–21 season as she was expecting her second child in April 2021. Despite her absence, her team won the 2020 Stu Sells Oakville Tankard and finished runner-up at the 2020 Stu Sells Toronto Tankard on the tour. The 2021 Manitoba Scotties were cancelled due to the COVID-19 pandemic in Manitoba, so Curl Manitoba appointed the Jones rink to represent Manitoba at the 2021 Scotties Tournament of Hearts. At the 2021 Hearts, the team finished with a 9–3 record, putting them in a third-place tiebreaker match against Alberta, skipped by Laura Walker. Alberta defeated Manitoba 9–8 to advance to the semifinal. The team ended their season at the only two Grand Slam events of the abbreviated season. They missed the playoffs at both the 2021 Champions Cup and the 2021 Players' Championship.

Team Jones qualified for the playoffs in each of their first four tour events; however, they were not able to qualify for any finals. At the first Grand Slam of the season, the 2021 Masters, the team was able to reach the final before losing to Tracy Fleury in a 9–7 match. They then missed the playoffs at the 2021 National two weeks later.

A month later, Team Jones competed in the 2021 Canadian Olympic Curling Trials. There, the team posted a 5–3 round robin record, earning a spot in the semifinal. They then defeated Krista McCarville to qualify for the final, where they would face Fleury again. After a tight game all the way through, Team Fleury stole one in the ninth end to take a single-point lead. In the tenth end, Jones had an open hit-and-stick to win the game; however, her shooter rolled too far, and she only got one. This sent the game to an extra end. On her final shot, Fleury attempted a soft-weight hit on a Jones stone partially buried behind a guard. Her rock, however, curled too much and hit the guard, giving up a steal of one and the game to Team Jones. After the game, Jones said that "We're there to pick each other up when you miss, not everybody can say that and that's really a big strength of our team." With the win, Team Jones travelled to Beijing, China to represent Canada at the 2022 Winter Olympics. Through the round robin, the Canadian team had mixed results, ultimately finishing tied for third with a 5–4 record. However, because of their draw shot challenge results, which were the lowest of the teams they were tied with, they ranked fifth overall, missing the playoffs.

On March 15, 2022, Team Jones announced they would be parting ways after the 2021–22 season. McEwen also announced her retirement from competitive curling in March 2022.

Team Jones still had two more events together before parting ways, the 2022 Players' Championship and 2022 Champions Cup Grand Slams. At the Players', the team went 1–3, missing the playoffs. They then missed the playoffs again at the Champions Cup with a 1–4 record, ending the team's run together.

McEwen came out of retirement to play for Team Kerri Einarson at the 2024 Tour Challenge Grand Slam event. McEwen was sparing for second Shannon Birchard who was suffering from a knee injury. The team went on to win the Slam, capturing McEwen's 16th career slam title in the process.

== Personal life ==
McEwen married fellow curler Mike McEwen in 2013. They have two daughters, Vienna and Avalon. McEwen graduated with a Bachelor's degree in Communications from the University of Ottawa in 2004. She works as a case officer with the Government of Canada.

== Teams ==
Season	Skip	Third	Second	Lead
1999–00	Jenn Hanna	Dawn Askin	Stephanie Hanna	Melanie Robillard
2001–02	Darcie Simpson	Kellie Andrews	Dawn Askin	Linda Fulton
2002–03	Darcie Simpson	Jenn Hanna	Dawn Askin	Linda Fulton
2003–04	Jenn Hanna	Joëlle Sabourin	Dawn Askin	Stephanie Hanna
2004–05	Jenn Hanna	Pascale Letendre	Dawn Askin	Stephanie Hanna
2005–06	Jenn Hanna	Joëlle Sabourin	Dawn Askin	Stephanie Hanna
2007	Jennifer Jones	Cathy Overton-Clapham	Jill Officer	Dawn Askin
2007–08	Jennifer Jones	Cathy Overton-Clapham	Jill Officer	Dawn Askin
2008–09	Jennifer Jones	Cathy Overton-Clapham	Jill Officer	Dawn Askin
2009–10	Jennifer Jones	Cathy Overton-Clapham	Jill Officer	Dawn Askin
2010–11	Jennifer Jones	Kaitlyn Lawes	Jill Officer	Dawn Askin
2011–12	Jennifer Jones	Kaitlyn Lawes	Joëlle Sabourin (Sept–Dec); Jill Officer (Jan–April)	Dawn Askin
2012–13 (Note: Jones was on maternity leave for the beginning of the 2012–13 curling season and returned to her team in January 2013.)	Jennifer Jones	Kaitlyn Lawes	Jill Officer	Dawn Askin
2013–14	Jennifer Jones	Kaitlyn Lawes	Jill Officer	Dawn McEwen
2014–15	Jennifer Jones	Kaitlyn Lawes	Jill Officer	Dawn McEwen
2015–16	Jennifer Jones	Kaitlyn Lawes	Jill Officer	Dawn McEwen
2016–17	Jennifer Jones	Kaitlyn Lawes	Jill Officer	Dawn McEwen
2017–18	Jennifer Jones	Kaitlyn Lawes; Shannon Birchard (STOH only)	Jill Officer	Dawn McEwen
2018–19	Jennifer Jones	Kaitlyn Lawes	Jocelyn Peterman	Dawn McEwen
2019–20	Jennifer Jones	Kaitlyn Lawes	Jocelyn Peterman	Dawn McEwen
2020–21	Jennifer Jones	Kaitlyn Lawes	Jocelyn Peterman	Dawn McEwen / Lisa Weagle
2021–22	Jennifer Jones	Kaitlyn Lawes	Jocelyn Peterman	Dawn McEwen / Lisa Weagle
