= St. Vital Curling Club =

Sports club in Winnipeg, Manitoba

St Vital Curling Club
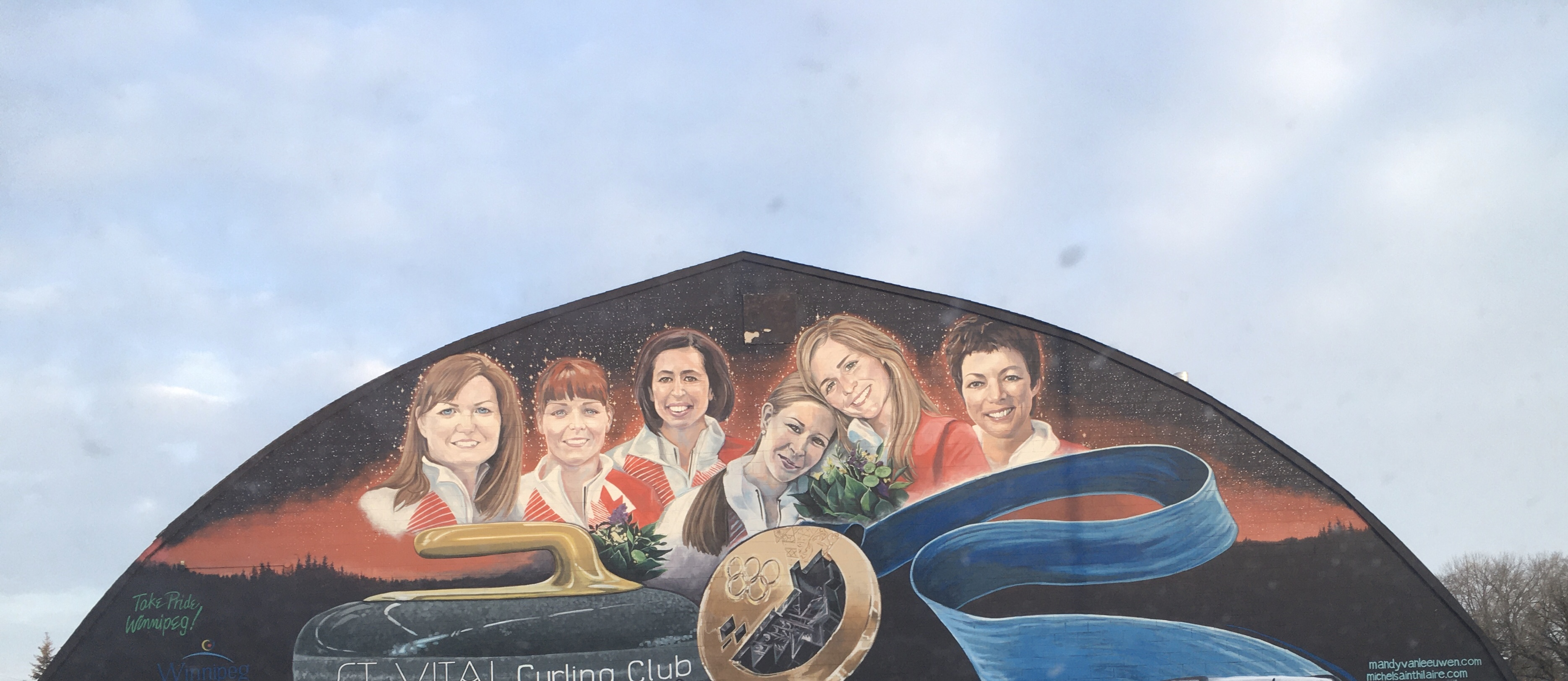
- Interactive map of St Vital Curling Club
- Location: 286 Regal Ave. St. Vital (Winnipeg), Manitoba R2M 0P5; Canada; 49°51′29″N 97°06′17″W

Information
- Established: 1933; 93 years ago
- Website: http://stvitalcurling.ca/

The St. Vital Curling Club, located in Winnipeg, Manitoba, is a curling club in Western Canada and was founded in 1933. It started curling events in December 1933 in a building that was owned by the St. Vital Agricultural Society which it purchased in 1950. It was then moved to its current location in 1954 on Regal Avenue in Winnipeg.

== History ==
In December of 1933, The first rocks that were thrown at the St. Vital Curling Club. Curling grew in popularity over the next two decades and by 1950 the St. Vital Curling Club purchased the building from the Agricultural Society and added another lean-to on the other side of the building. This lean increased the number of curling sheets to six. By 1955 further renovations and changes were completed to a new clubhouse consisting of a full basement with locker room facilities and a one storey viewing area where food and drinks are served. by 1972, Membership continued to grow and further expansion as needed, a second storey bar facility was installed complete with dance floor to host events. The club hosted it first Canadian Mixed Curling Championship in 1974.

In addition to state of good repair maintenance and general improvements, the latest upgrades to the club have included the purchase of new curling rocks in 2012, and a major paint job to update the interior of the club to match the club colours of blue and gold. In the 21st century, members of the club found international success at the Olympic Games. To honour this success, the club commissioned a mural depicting the gold medal winning women's team on its southern outer wall.

== Membership ==
2017-2018 President - Pam Kok

2018-2020 President - Ken Stevens

2020-2022 President - Jason Pruden

2022-2024 President - Kevin Blunden

2024-2026 President - Patti Ulrich

It is the home curling club of 2014 Olympic curling champions Jennifer Jones, Kaitlyn Lawes, Jill Officer and Dawn McEwen as well as 2018 Olympic Doubles curling champion Kaitlyn Lawes. The street the curling club is on was named Honorary Team Jones Way after their Olympic victory.
