= Carter Rycroft =

Canadian curler (born 1977)

- Curler
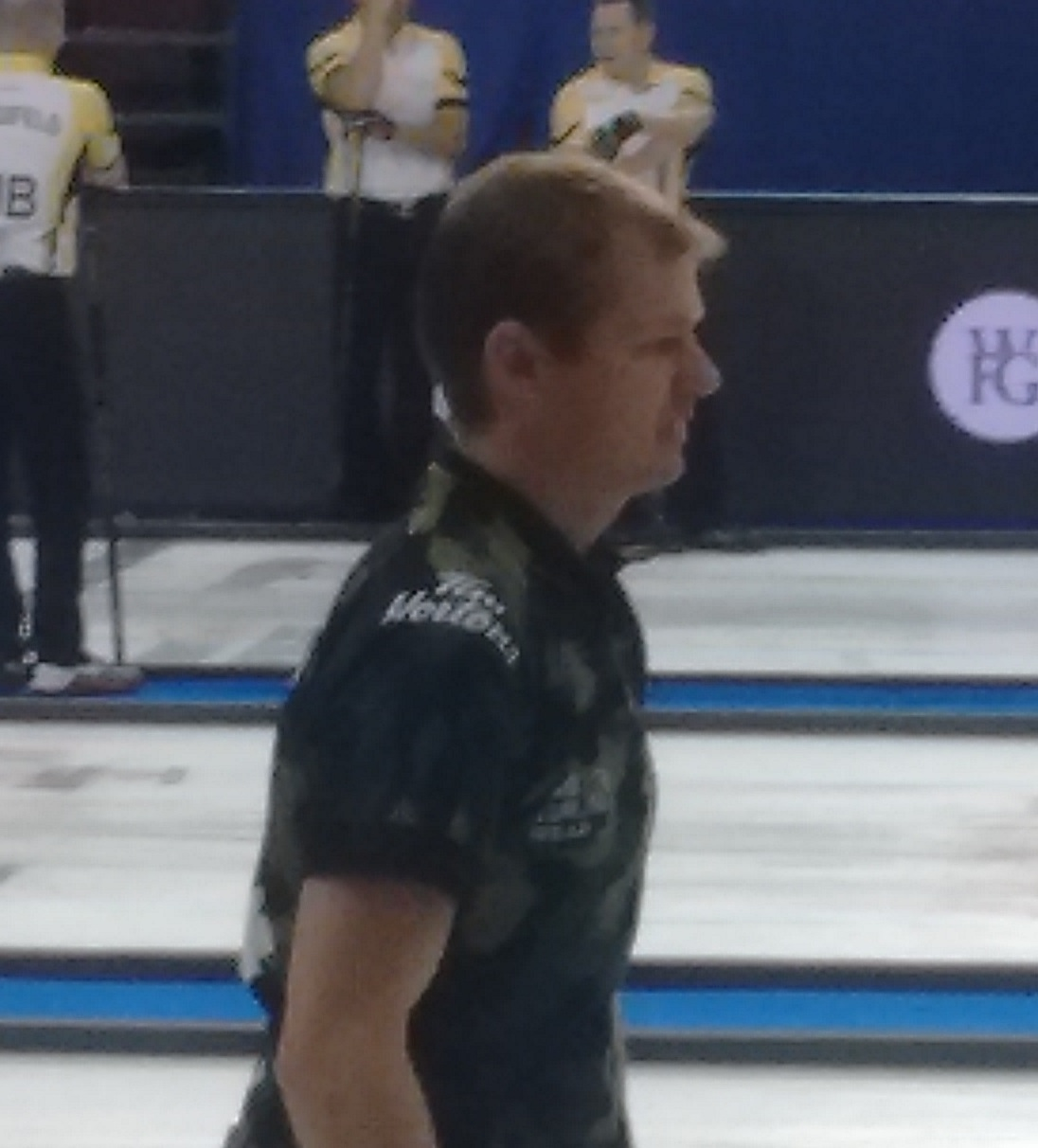
- Born: August 29, 1977 (age 49); Grande Prairie, Alberta, Canada

Team
- Curling club: Saville Community SC, Edmonton, AB

Curling career
- Member Association: Alberta
- Brier: 8 (2000, 2006, 2010, 2012, 2014, 2015, 2016, 2022)
- World Championship: 3 (2010, 2014, 2015)
- Olympic: 1 (2002)
- Top CTRS ranking: 2nd (2013–14)
- Grand Slam victories: 8 (Masters: Jan. 2003, 2012; The National: Nov. 2004; Canadian Open: 2002, 2005, 2013; Players' Championship: 2000, 2005)
Medal record
Men's curling
Representing Canada
Winter Olympics
Silver medal – second place	2002 Salt Lake City
World Curling Championships
Gold medal – first place	2010 Cortina d'Ampezzo
Bronze medal – third place	2015 Halifax
Representing Alberta
Canadian Olympic Curling Trials
Gold medal – first place	2001 Regina
Tim Hortons Brier
Gold medal – first place	2010 Halifax
Gold medal – first place	2014 Kamloops
Gold medal – first place	2015 Calgary
Silver medal – second place	2012 Saskatoon
Silver medal – second place	2022 Lethbridge

Carter Rycroft (born August 29, 1977) is a Canadian curler from Sherwood Park, Alberta. He was a member of the Canadian Olympic team, skipped by Kevin Martin, that won a silver medal at the 2002 Winter Olympics.

== Career ==
Rycroft joined the Martin rink in 1999 after skipping Team Alberta at the 1998 Canadian Junior Curling Championships and playing for Randy Ferbey. With Martin, he won two provincial championships (2000, 2006), two Canada Cups (2005, 2006) and the Olympic silver medal (2002). He left the Martin rink in 2006 and joined the Kevin Koe rink. Rycroft won another Canada Cup playing second with Koe, followed by his first Brier championship title at Halifax in 2010. The team beat Ontario's Glenn Howard 6-5 in the final. At the 2014 Kamloops Brier the Koe rink repeated as Canadian champions, defeating John Morris' B.C. rink 10-5 in the final. In 2014, Koe left the team, and was replaced by Morris as skip.

== Personal life ==
Rycroft is the owner of the Prairie West Ventures and Majestic Rentals. He is married to Sheila Rycroft and has three children. At the 2014 Brier Rycroft, whose wife was pregnant, said he planned to take a year off curling. However, since the team won the Brier in 2014, he continued to play in certain events.

== Teams ==
Season	Skip	Third	Second	Lead	Events
1996–97	David Nedohin (fourth)	Randy Ferbey (skip)	Carter Rycroft	Pat McCallum	WCT events
1997–98	Carter Rycroft	Glen Kennedy	Marc Kennedy	Jason Lesmeister	1998 Juniors
1998–99	David Nedohin (fourth)	Randy Ferbey (skip)	Scott Pfeifer	Carter Rycroft	
1999–00	Kevin Martin	Don Walchuk	Carter Rycroft	Don Bartlett	2000 Alta., Brier
2000–01	Kevin Martin	Don Walchuk	Carter Rycroft	Don Bartlett	2001 Alta.
2001–02	Kevin Martin	Don Walchuk	Carter Rycroft	Don Bartlett	2001 COCT, 2002 OG
2002–03	Kevin Martin	Don Walchuk	Carter Rycroft	Don Bartlett	
2003–04	Kevin Martin	Don Walchuk	Carter Rycroft	Don Bartlett	2004 Alta.
2004–05	Kevin Martin	Don Walchuk	Carter Rycroft	Don Bartlett	2005 CC
2005–06	Kevin Martin	Don Walchuk	Carter Rycroft	Don Bartlett	2005 COCT, 2006 Alta., CC, Brier
2006–07	Blake MacDonald (fourth)	Kevin Koe (skip)	Carter Rycroft	Nolan Thiessen	
2007–08	Blake MacDonald (fourth)	Kevin Koe (skip)	Carter Rycroft	Nolan Thiessen	Canada Cup
2008-09	Blake MacDonald (fourth)	Kevin Koe (skip)	Carter Rycroft	Nolan Thiessen	
2009–10	Kevin Koe	Blake MacDonald	Carter Rycroft	Nolan Thiessen	2009 COCT, 2010 Alta, Brier, WCC
2010–11	Kevin Koe	Blake MacDonald	Carter Rycroft	Nolan Thiessen	2011 Alta
2011–12	Kevin Koe	Pat Simmons	Carter Rycroft	Nolan Thiessen	2012 Alta, Brier
2012–13	Kevin Koe	Pat Simmons	Carter Rycroft	Nolan Thiessen	2013 Alta
2013–14	Kevin Koe	Pat Simmons	Carter Rycroft	Nolan Thiessen	2014 Alta, Brier, WCC
2014–15	John Morris	Pat Simmons	Carter Rycroft	Nolan Thiessen	2015 Brier, WCC
2015–16	Pat Simmons	John Morris	Carter Rycroft	Nolan Thiessen	2016 Brier
