= Nolan Thiessen =

Canadian curler (born 1980)

- Curler
- Born: November 6, 1980 (age 46); Pilot Mound, Manitoba, Canada

Curling career
- Brier: 5 (2010, 2012, 2014, 2015, 2016)
- World Championship: 3 (2010, 2014, 2015)
- Top CTRS ranking: 2nd (2013–14)
- Grand Slam victories: 2 (Masters, 2012; Canadian Open: 2013)
Medal record
Men's curling
Representing Canada
World Curling Championships
Gold medal – first place	2010 Cortina d'Ampezzo
Bronze medal – third place	2015 Halifax
Winter Universiade
Gold medal – first place	2003 Tarvisio
Representing Alberta
Tim Hortons Brier
Gold medal – first place	2010 Halifax
Gold medal – first place	2014 Kamloops
Gold medal – first place	2015 Calgary
Silver medal – second place	2012 Saskatoon
Representing Manitoba
Canadian Junior Curling Championships
Silver medal – second place	2001 St. Catharines

Nolan Thiessen (born November 6, 1980, in Pilot Mound, Manitoba) is a Canadian retired curler and sports executive. He is currently the CEO of Curling Canada.

== Career ==
Thiessen, in his debut at Canadian Juniors, lost the final of the 2001 Canadian Junior Curling Championships playing lead for Mike McEwen. Thiessen was a member of the 2003 Winter Universiade championship team. He represented Brandon University, playing lead for Mike McEwen. After university, he played lead for Sean Grassie before moving to play in Alberta as Mark Johnson's lead in 2004. In 2006, he moved to play for Kevin Koe. Thiessen won the 2008 Canada Cup of Curling with the team, and qualified for his first Brier in 2010 as Team Alberta. The team won the Brier after beating Ontario's Glenn Howard 6-5 in the final. They went on to win at that year's world championship, securing the gold medal in a win over Norway, skipped by Torger Nergård. After Pat Simmons signed on with the team, they went to their second Brier in 2012, but lost to Ontario, skipped by Glenn Howard, in the final. At the 2014 Brier the rink repeated as Canadian champions, defeating John Morris's B.C. rink 10-5 in the final. The team went on to finish in fourth place at the 2014 World Men's Curling Championship. After the season, Koe left the team and was replaced by John Morris. The team represented Team Canada at the 2015 Tim Hortons Brier as defending champions. They won the 2015 Brier and went on to win a bronze medal at the 2015 Ford World Men's Curling Championship. The team represented Team Canada at the 2016 Tim Hortons Brier for the final time, finishing in fifth place. They went their separate ways after the season, and Thiessen retired from competitive curling.

Thiessen was formally hired by Curling Canada in 2018, eventually becoming the Executive Director of Marketing and Fan Experience. He was appointed CEO of Curling Canada in January 2024.

== Personal life ==
Thiessen enjoyed playing baseball growing up. He played for the Claiborne Christian High School in Louisiana and played one year at Vernon College in Texas, which led to his participation in a regional tournament for the junior College World Series. He also played baseball at the 2001 Canada Summer Games for Team Manitoba.

After playing baseball in Texas, Thiessen returned to Manitoba and finished his education at the University of Manitoba, and worked as a self-employed chartered accountant. As of 2016, he is married to Christine Sinclair (not the soccer player) and has three children That year, he moved with his wife to McKinney, Texas, where she found work. They sold their home in Texas in 2018.
