= 2022 Canadian Mixed Doubles Curling Olympic Trials =

- Host city: Portage la Prairie, Manitoba
- Arena: Stride Place
- Dates: December 28, 2021 – January 2, 2022

The 2022 Canadian Mixed Doubles Curling Olympic Trials, also known as the Canad Inns Canadian Mixed Doubles Trials, was scheduled to be held from December 28, 2021, to January 2, 2022, at Stride Place in Portage la Prairie, Manitoba. The winners of this event were to represent Canada at the 2022 Winter Olympics. On December 26, 2021, it was announced that the event would be cancelled due to the spread of the COVID-19 pandemic in Canada.

On January 13, 2022, Curling Canada with consultation from the Canadian Olympic Committee and Own the Podium decided to pick the team of Rachel Homan and John Morris to represent Canada at the Olympics.

== Qualification process ==
Teams qualified for these Olympics Trials through one of the following qualification methods:

Qualification method	Berths	Qualifying team(s)
CMDR as of May 20, 2020	4	~~Jocelyn Peterman / Brett Gallant~~; Lauren Wasylkiw (Note: Lauren Wasylkiw and Shane Konings replaced Jocelyn Peterman and Brett Gallant as they already qualified for the Olympics in the team event.) / Shane Konings; ~~Jennifer Jones~~ (Note: Selena Njegovan replaced Jennifer Jones as Jones already qualified for the Olympics in the team event.) (Selena Njegovan) / Brent Laing; Nancy Martin / Tyrel Griffith; Rachel Homan / John Morris
2021 CMDCC	2	Kerri Einarson / ~~Brad Gushue~~ (Note: Brad Jacobs replaced Brad Gushue as Gushue already qualified for the Olympics in the team event.) (Brad Jacobs); Kadriana Sahaidak / Colton Lott
Berth Bonspiel #1	1	Lisa Weagle / John Epping
Berth Bonspiel #2	1	Bobbie Sauder / Brendan Bottcher (Note: Bobbie Sauder and Brendan Bottcher earned the second berth bonspiel qualification spot as no Canadian teams not already qualified for the Trials placed in the top four.)
Berth Bonspiel #3	2	Laurie St-Georges / Félix Asselin; Chelsea Carey / Colin Hodgson
CMDR as of Dec. 14, 2021	4	Shannon Birchard / Catlin Schneider; Val Sweeting / Marc Kennedy; Clancy Grandy / Pat Janssen; Laura Walker / Kirk Muyres
CMDR as of Dec. 14, 2021 excluding CTRS	2	Kim Tuck / Wayne Tuck (Note: The team been barred from participation as Wayne Tuck tested positive for COVID-19, prior to the cancellation of the event); Émilie Desjardins / Robert Desjardins

== Teams ==
The teams are listed as follows:

Female	Male	Province(s)
Shannon Birchard	Catlin Schneider	Manitoba / Saskatchewan
Chelsea Carey	Colin Hodgson	Alberta / Ontario
Émilie Desjardins	Robert Desjardins	Quebec
Kerri Einarson	Brad Jacobs	Manitoba / Ontario
Clancy Grandy	Pat Janssen	Ontario
Rachel Homan	John Morris	Alberta
Nancy Martin	Tyrel Griffith	Saskatchewan / British Columbia
Selena Njegovan	Brent Laing	Manitoba / Ontario
Kadriana Sahaidak	Colton Lott	Manitoba
Bobbie Sauder	Brendan Bottcher	Alberta
Laurie St-Georges	Félix Asselin	Quebec
Val Sweeting	Marc Kennedy	Alberta
Laura Walker	Kirk Muyres	Alberta / Saskatchewan
Lauren Wasylkiw	Shane Konings	Ontario
Lisa Weagle	John Epping	Ontario

== Round robin standings ==
Key
Teams to Championship Round

Pool A	W	L	S%
(Manitoba) (Saskatchewan) Birchard / Schneider	0	0	%
(Quebec) Desjardins / Desjardins	0	0	%
(Manitoba) (Ontario) Einarson / Jacobs	0	0	%
(Saskatchewan) (British Columbia) Martin / Griffith	0	0	%
(Manitoba) (Ontario) Njegovan / Laing	0	0	%
(Manitoba) Sahaidak / Lott	0	0	%
(Alberta) (Saskatchewan) Walker / Muyres	0	0	%
(Ontario) Wasylkiw / Konings	0	0	%

Pool B	W	L	S%
(Alberta) (Ontario) Carey / Hodgson	0	0	%
(Ontario) Grandy / Janssen	0	0	%
(Alberta) Homan / Morris	0	0	%
(Alberta) Sauder / Bottcher	0	0	%
(Quebec) St-Georges / Asselin	0	0	%
(Alberta) Sweeting / Kennedy	0	0	%
(Ontario) Weagle / Epping	0	0	%

== Round robin results ==
All draw times are listed in Central Time (UTC−06:00).

=== Draw 1 ===
Tuesday, December 28, 9:00 am

Sheet B	1	2	3	4	5	6	7	8	Final
(Alberta) Sweeting / Kennedy									0
(Quebec) St-Georges / Asselin									0

Sheet C	1	2	3	4	5	6	7	8	Final
(Alberta) Homan / Morris									0
(Alberta) (Ontario) Carey / Hodgson									0

Sheet D	1	2	3	4	5	6	7	8	Final
(Alberta) Sauder / Bottcher									0
(Ontario) Weagle / Epping									0

=== Draw 2 ===
Tuesday, December 28, 12:30 pm

Sheet A	1	2	3	4	5	6	7	8	Final
(Quebec) Desjardins / Desjardins									0
(Manitoba) Sahaidak / Lott									0

Sheet B	1	2	3	4	5	6	7	8	Final
(Manitoba) (Saskatchewan) Birchard / Schneider									0
(Manitoba) (Ontario) Njegovan / Laing									0

Sheet C	1	2	3	4	5	6	7	8	Final
(Manitoba) (Ontario) Einarson / Jacobs									0
(Saskatchewan) (British Columbia) Martin / Griffith									0

Sheet D	1	2	3	4	5	6	7	8	Final
(Ontario) Wasylkiw / Konings									0
(Alberta) (Saskatchewan) Walker / Muyres									0

=== Draw 3 ===
Tuesday, December 28, 4:00 pm

Sheet A	1	2	3	4	5	6	7	8	Final
(Alberta) Sweeting / Kennedy									0
(Alberta) (Ontario) Carey / Hodgson									0

Sheet C	1	2	3	4	5	6	7	8	Final
(Alberta) Sauder / Bottcher									0
(Ontario) Grandy / Janssen									0

Sheet D	1	2	3	4	5	6	7	8	Final
(Alberta) Homan / Morris									0
(Quebec) St-Georges / Asselin									0

=== Draw 4 ===
Tuesday, December 28, 7:30 pm

Sheet A	1	2	3	4	5	6	7	8	Final
(Manitoba) (Saskatchewan) Birchard / Schneider									0
(Saskatchewan) (British Columbia) Martin / Griffith									0

Sheet B	1	2	3	4	5	6	7	8	Final
(Quebec) Desjardins / Desjardins									0
(Alberta) (Saskatchewan) Walker / Muyres									0

Sheet C	1	2	3	4	5	6	7	8	Final
(Ontario) Wasylkiw / Konings									0
(Manitoba) Sahaidak / Lott									0

Sheet D	1	2	3	4	5	6	7	8	Final
(Manitoba) (Ontario) Einarson / Jacobs									0
(Manitoba) (Ontario) Njegovan / Laing									0

=== Draw 5 ===
Wednesday, December 29, 9:00 am

Sheet A	1	2	3	4	5	6	7	8	Final
(Alberta) Sauder / Bottcher									0
(Alberta) Homan / Morris									0

Sheet B	1	2	3	4	5	6	7	8	Final
(Ontario) Grandy / Janssen									0
(Alberta) (Ontario) Carey / Hodgson									0

Sheet C	1	2	3	4	5	6	7	8	Final
(Ontario) Weagle / Epping									0
(Quebec) St-Georges / Asselin									0

=== Draw 6 ===
Wednesday, December 29, 12:30 pm

Sheet A	1	2	3	4	5	6	7	8	Final
(Ontario) Wasylkiw / Konings									0
(Manitoba) (Ontario) Einarson / Jacobs									0

Sheet B	1	2	3	4	5	6	7	8	Final
(Manitoba) Sahaidak / Lott									0
(Saskatchewan) (British Columbia) Martin / Griffith									0

Sheet C	1	2	3	4	5	6	7	8	Final
(Alberta) (Saskatchewan) Walker / Muyres									0
(Manitoba) (Ontario) Njegovan / Laing									0

Sheet D	1	2	3	4	5	6	7	8	Final
(Quebec) Desjardins / Desjardins									0
(Manitoba) (Saskatchewan) Birchard / Schneider									0

=== Draw 7 ===
Wednesday, December 29, 4:00 pm

Sheet A	1	2	3	4	5	6	7	8	Final
(Alberta) (Ontario) Carey / Hodgson									0
(Quebec) St-Georges / Asselin									0

Sheet C	1	2	3	4	5	6	7	8	Final
(Alberta) Sweeting / Kennedy									0
(Alberta) Homan / Morris									0

Sheet D	1	2	3	4	5	6	7	8	Final
(Ontario) Weagle / Epping									0
(Ontario) Grandy / Janssen									0

=== Draw 8 ===
Wednesday, December 29, 7:30 pm

Sheet A	1	2	3	4	5	6	7	8	Final
(Saskatchewan) (British Columbia) Martin / Griffith									0
(Manitoba) (Ontario) Njegovan / Laing									0

Sheet B	1	2	3	4	5	6	7	8	Final
(Ontario) Wasylkiw / Konings									0
(Quebec) Desjardins / Desjardins									0

Sheet C	1	2	3	4	5	6	7	8	Final
(Manitoba) (Saskatchewan) Birchard / Schneider									0
(Manitoba) (Ontario) Einarson / Jacobs									0

Sheet D	1	2	3	4	5	6	7	8	Final
(Alberta) (Saskatchewan) Walker / Muyres									0
(Manitoba) Sahaidak / Lott									0

=== Draw 9 ===
Thursday, December 30, 9:00 am

Sheet A	1	2	3	4	5	6	7	8	Final
(Manitoba) (Ontario) Einarson / Jacobs									0
(Quebec) Desjardins / Desjardins									0

Sheet B	1	2	3	4	5	6	7	8	Final
(Manitoba) (Ontario) Njegovan / Laing									0
(Manitoba) Sahaidak / Lott									0

Sheet C	1	2	3	4	5	6	7	8	Final
(Saskatchewan) (British Columbia) Martin / Griffith									0
(Alberta) (Saskatchewan) Walker / Muyres									0

Sheet D	1	2	3	4	5	6	7	8	Final
(Manitoba) (Saskatchewan) Birchard / Schneider									0
(Ontario) Wasylkiw / Konings									0

=== Draw 10 ===
Thursday, December 30, 12:30 pm

Sheet B	1	2	3	4	5	6	7	8	Final
(Quebec) St-Georges / Asselin									0
(Ontario) Grandy / Janssen									0

Sheet C	1	2	3	4	5	6	7	8	Final
(Alberta) (Ontario) Carey / Hodgson									0
(Ontario) Weagle / Epping									0

Sheet D	1	2	3	4	5	6	7	8	Final
(Alberta) Sweeting / Kennedy									0
(Alberta) Sauder / Bottcher									0

=== Draw 11 ===
Thursday, December 30, 4:00 pm

Sheet A	1	2	3	4	5	6	7	8	Final
(Alberta) (Saskatchewan) Walker / Muyres									0
(Manitoba) (Saskatchewan) Birchard / Schneider									0

Sheet B	1	2	3	4	5	6	7	8	Final
(Saskatchewan) (British Columbia) Martin / Griffith									0
(Ontario) Wasylkiw / Konings									0

Sheet C	1	2	3	4	5	6	7	8	Final
(Manitoba) (Ontario) Njegovan / Laing									0
(Quebec) Desjardins / Desjardins									0

Sheet D	1	2	3	4	5	6	7	8	Final
(Manitoba) Sahaidak / Lott									0
(Manitoba) (Ontario) Einarson / Jacobs									0

=== Draw 12 ===
Thursday, December 30, 7:30 pm

Sheet A	1	2	3	4	5	6	7	8	Final
(Ontario) Weagle / Epping									0
(Alberta) Sweeting / Kennedy									0

Sheet B	1	2	3	4	5	6	7	8	Final
(Alberta) (Ontario) Carey / Hodgson									0
(Alberta) Sauder / Bottcher									0

Sheet D	1	2	3	4	5	6	7	8	Final
(Ontario) Grandy / Janssen									0
(Alberta) Homan / Morris									0

=== Draw 13 ===
Friday, December 31, 9:00 am

Sheet A	1	2	3	4	5	6	7	8	Final
(Manitoba) (Ontario) Njegovan / Laing									0
(Ontario) Wasylkiw / Konings									0

Sheet B	1	2	3	4	5	6	7	8	Final
(Alberta) (Saskatchewan) Walker / Muyres									0
(Manitoba) (Ontario) Einarson / Jacobs									0

Sheet C	1	2	3	4	5	6	7	8	Final
(Manitoba) Sahaidak / Lott									0
(Manitoba) (Saskatchewan) Birchard / Schneider									0

Sheet D	1	2	3	4	5	6	7	8	Final
(Saskatchewan) (British Columbia) Martin / Griffith									0
(Quebec) Desjardins / Desjardins									0

=== Draw 14 ===
Friday, December 31, 12:30 pm

Sheet A	1	2	3	4	5	6	7	8	Final
(Quebec) St-Georges / Asselin									0
(Alberta) Sauder / Bottcher									0

Sheet B	1	2	3	4	5	6	7	8	Final
(Ontario) Weagle / Epping									0
(Alberta) Homan / Morris									0

Sheet C	1	2	3	4	5	6	7	8	Final
(Ontario) Grandy / Janssen									0
(Alberta) Sweeting / Kennedy									0

== Championship round ==
Semifinals

To 1 vs. 2 Page Playoff

=== Semifinals ===
Friday, December 31, 4:00 pm

Team	1	2	3	4	5	6	7	8	Final
									0
									0

Team	1	2	3	4	5	6	7	8	Final
									0
									0

=== Finals ===
Saturday, January 1, 11:30 am

Team	1	2	3	4	5	6	7	8	Final
									0
									0

Team	1	2	3	4	5	6	7	8	Final
									0
									0

== Playoffs ==
Page playoff system
1
2
3
4

Semifinal

Final

=== 1 vs. 2 ===
Saturday, January 1, 4:30 pm

Team	1	2	3	4	5	6	7	8	Final
									0
									0

=== 3 vs. 4 ===
Saturday, January 1, 4:30 pm

Team	1	2	3	4	5	6	7	8	Final
									0
									0

=== Semifinal ===
Sunday, January 2, 9:30 am

Team	1	2	3	4	5	6	7	8	Final
									0
									0

=== Final ===
Sunday, January 2, 1:30 pm

Team	1	2	3	4	5	6	7	8	Final
									0
									0
