= Jocelyn Peterman =

Canadian curler (born 1993)

- Curler
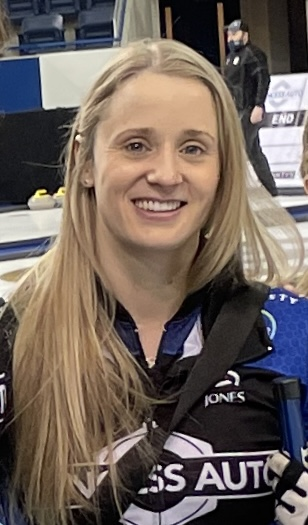
- Peterman at the 2022 Players' Championship
- Born: Jocelyn Andrea Peterman; September 23, 1993 (age 33); Red Deer, Alberta, Canada
- Height: 163 cm (5 ft 4 in)

Team
- Curling club: The Glencoe Club; Calgary, AB
- Skip: Kerri Einarson
- Third: Shannon Birchard
- Second: Karlee Burgess
- Lead: Jocelyn Peterman
- Mixed doubles partner: Brett Gallant

Curling career
- Member Association: Alberta (2011–2018); Manitoba (2018–present)
- Hearts: 8 (2016, 2017, 2019, 2020, 2021, 2023, 2024, 2025)
- World Championship: 1 (2016)
- World Mixed Doubles Championship: 3 (2019, 2022, 2025)
- Olympic: 2 (2022, 2026)
- Top CTRS ranking: 3rd (2017–18, 2018–19, 2019–20, 2021–22, 2025–26)
- Grand Slam victories: 2 (2018 Canadian Open, 2026 Invitational)
Medal record
Women's curling
Representing Canada
World Mixed Doubles Championship
Silver medal – second place	2019 Stavanger
Scotties Tournament of Hearts
Bronze medal – third place	2017 St. Catharines
Representing Alberta
Canadian Olympic Curling Trials
Silver medal – second place	2017 Ottawa
Canadian Mixed Doubles Olympic Trials
Gold medal – first place	2025 Liverpool
Bronze medal – third place	2018 Portage la Prairie
Scotties Tournament of Hearts
Gold medal – first place	2016 Grande Prairie
Canadian Mixed Doubles Championship
Gold medal – first place	2016 Saskatoon
Silver medal – second place	2023 Sudbury
Bronze medal – third place	2024 Fredericton
Canada Winter Games
Silver medal – second place	2011 Halifax
Representing Manitoba
Canadian Olympic Curling Trials
Gold medal – first place	2021 Saskatoon
Canadian Mixed Doubles Championship
Gold medal – first place	2019 Fredericton
Representing (Manitoba) Team Wild Card
Scotties Tournament of Hearts
Bronze medal – third place	2020 Moose Jaw

Jocelyn Andrea Peterman (born September 23, 1993) is a Canadian curler. She currently plays lead on Team Kerri Einarson and mixed doubles with her husband Brett Gallant. She was the second on the Canadian team, skipped by Jennifer Jones at the 2022 Winter Olympics, and played in the mixed doubles event at the 2026 Winter Olympics with Gallant.

== Career ==
=== Juniors ===
Peterman and her team of Brittany Tran, Becca Konschuh and Kristine Anderson won a silver medal skipping Alberta at the 2011 Canada Winter Games, losing to British Columbia's Corryn Brown in the final. The next season, the team represented Alberta at the 2012 Canadian Junior Curling Championships. They won the event, defeating Manitoba's Shannon Birchard rink in the national final. This qualified the team to represent Canada at the 2012 World Junior Curling Championships. After posting a 6–3 round robin record, the team lost to Russia's Anna Sidorova in a tie-breaker match, thus failing to make the playoffs. In 2013, her rink failed to even make the Canadian Juniors, having not even made the playoffs in the Alberta playdowns. In 2014, her last year of junior eligibility, Peterman's team lost in the Alberta junior final to Kelsey Rocque, who would go on to win that year's World Junior championships.

During her junior career, the Peterman team entered several World Curling Tour, including the Curlers Corner Autumn Gold Curling Classic twice, which was a Grand Slam event at the time. She would win just one match at the 2012 Curlers Corner Autumn Gold Curling Classic and was winless at the 2013 Curlers Corner Autumn Gold Curling Classic.

=== Women's ===
After juniors, Peterman joined the Heather Nedohin team in 2014 as their alternate, later becoming their second. On the World Curling Tour that season, the team entered four slams, making the playoffs in three. Their best result was a semi-final finish at the Canadian Open. They also played in the 2014 Canada Cup of Curling, finishing in third place. The team played in the 2015 Alberta Scotties Tournament of Hearts, the first provincial championship appearance for Peterman. There, the rink made it to the semi-final, where they lost to Chelsea Carey.

Nedohin retired from curling in 2015, and Chelsea Carey would take over the team as skip, with Peterman becoming the full-time second, replacing Jessica Mair. The team would fail to qualify for either Slam they entered that season. They did however win the 2016 Alberta Scotties Tournament of Hearts, defeating Edmonton's Val Sweeting in the final. The win sent Peterman to her first ever national women's championship, the 2016 Scotties Tournament of Hearts. At this event, her team of Carey, Amy Nixon, Laine Peters, alternate Susan O'Connor and coach Charley Thomas went 9–2 in the round robin, clinching the first place seed in the playoffs. The team defeated Jennifer Jones of Team Canada in the 1-vs-2 game and then Northern Ontario's Krista McCarville in the final. Peterman represented Canada at the 2016 Ford World Women's Curling Championship, in Swift Current, where the team went on to finish in fourth place.

Early in the 2016-17 curling season, the Carey rink played in the 2016 Canada Cup of Curling and finished with a 2–4 record. Later in the year, the Carey rink represented Team Canada (as defending champions) at the 2017 Scotties Tournament of Hearts, where they won a bronze medal.

Team Carey had a strong run at the 2017 Canadian Olympic Curling Trials, going undefeated until losing to the Rachel Homan rink in the final. The team continued on this roll into the new year, winning the 2018 Meridian Canadian Open. Their success stopped at the 2018 Alberta Scotties Tournament of Hearts, with the team losing both of their playoff games. They had a second chance at making that year's Scotties Tournament of Hearts, where they played Kerri Einarson in a wild-card game, but they would lose that event too. After the season, Peterman left the team, moving to Winnipeg to play for Jennifer Jones, replacing the retiring Jill Officer.

In her first season as a member of Team Jones, the team won the 2018 Canada Cup and the 2019 TSN All-Star Curling Skins Game, but failed to win any Grand Slam events. As Jones had won the 2018 Scotties Tournament of Hearts, the team represented Team Canada at the 2019 Scotties Tournament of Hearts. There the team failed to make the playoffs, finishing with a 6–5 record.

In their first event of the 2019-20 season, Team Jones won the 2019 AMJ Campbell Shorty Jenkins Classic, defeating Tracy Fleury in the final. Next they played in the 2019 Colonial Square Ladies Classic where Fleury would take them out in the semi-finals. They had two quarterfinal finishes at the first two Slams of the season, the Masters and the Tour Challenge. At the Canada Cup, the team struggled, finishing with a 2–4 record. The team made the final at the Boost National, losing to Team Hasselborg, and the quarterfinals at the Canadian Open. The team made the final of the 2020 Manitoba Scotties Tournament of Hearts and lost to Team Einarson. By virtue of their CTRS ranking, the team had a second chance to qualify for the 2020 Scotties Tournament of Hearts through the wild card play-in game, where they defeated Team Fleury to become Team Wild Card. At the Scotties, they finished the round robin and championship pool with a 9–2 record as the second seed in playoffs but lost to Kerri Einarson (Team Manitoba) in the 1 vs. 2 playoff game and to Rachel Homan (Team Ontario) in the semifinal to finish in third place. It would be their last event of the season as both the Players' Championship, and the Champions Cup Grand Slam events were also cancelled due to the COVID-19 pandemic. On March 18, 2020, the team announced that Lisa Weagle, after parting ways with Team Homan, would join the team in a 5-player rotation. Peterman curled 82% at the tournament and was named to the second all-star team as a result.

The Jones rink won their lone event of the abbreviated 2020–21 season at the 2020 Stu Sells Oakville Tankard. The 2021 Manitoba Scotties were cancelled due to the COVID-19 pandemic in Manitoba, so Curl Manitoba appointed the Jones rink to represent Manitoba at the 2021 Scotties Tournament of Hearts. At the 2021 Hearts, the team finished with a 9–3 record, putting them in a third place tiebreaker match against Alberta, skipped by Laura Walker. Alberta defeated Manitoba 9–8 to advance to the semifinal. Team Jones ended their season at the only two Grand Slam events of the abbreviated season, also held in the Calgary bubble. The team missed the playoffs at both the 2021 Champions Cup and the 2021 Players' Championship.

Team Jones qualified for the playoffs in each of their first four tour events, however, they were not able to qualify for any finals. At the first Grand Slam of the season, the 2021 Masters, the team was able to reach the final before losing to Tracy Fleury in a 9–7 match. They then missed the playoffs at the 2021 National two weeks later.

A month later, Team Jones competed in the 2021 Canadian Olympic Curling Trials. There, the team posted a 5–3 round robin record, earning a spot in the semifinal. They then defeated Krista McCarville to qualify for the final, where they would face Fleury again. After a tight game all the way through, Team Fleury stole one in the ninth end to take a single-point lead. In the tenth end, Jones had an open hit-and-stick to win the game; however, her shooter rolled too far, and she only got one. This sent the game to an extra end. On her final shot, Fleury attempted a soft-weight hit on a Jones stone partially buried behind a guard. Her rock, however, curled too much and hit the guard, giving up a steal of one and the game to Team Jones. After the game, Jones said that "We're there to pick each other up when you miss, not everybody can say that and that's really a big strength of our team." With the win, Team Jones travelled to Beijing, China to represent Canada at the 2022 Winter Olympics. Through the round robin, the Canadian team had mixed results, ultimately finishing tied for third with a 5–4 record. However, because of their draw shot challenge results, which were the lowest of the teams they were tied with, they ranked fifth overall, missing the playoffs.

On March 15, 2022, Team Jones announced they would be parting ways after the 2021–22 season. Peterman and third Kaitlyn Lawes then announced they would be joining Selena Njegovan and Kristin MacCuish of Team Fleury to form a new team for the 2022–23 season. Lawes would skip the team, with Njegovan playing third, Peterman at second and MacCuish at lead.

Team Jones still had two more events together before parting ways, the 2022 Players' Championship and 2022 Champions Cup Grand Slams. At the Players', the team went 1–3, missing the playoffs. They then missed the playoffs again at the Champions Cup with a 1–4 record, ending the team's run together.

The new Lawes rink began the 2022–23 season with a second-place finish at the 2022 Oslo Cup. After going undefeated in the round robin, they beat Marianne Rørvik in the semifinal before losing 5–3 to Anna Hasselborg in the final. They were able to pick up their first tour victory at the Mother Club Fall Curling Classic, winning 6–2 in the final over Sarah Anderson. At the 2022 PointsBet Invitational, Team Lawes lost in the semifinal to Team Scheidegger. In the first Slam of the season, the 2022 National, the team advanced to the semifinals where they were stopped by Silvana Tirinzoni 7–5. They also qualified for the playoffs at the 2022 Tour Challenge where they lost in the quarterfinals to Rachel Homan. Following a quarterfinal finish at the 2022 Curlers Corner Autumn Gold Curling Classic, Lawes went on maternity leave. During that time, Selena Njegovan took over skipping the team, leading them to a victory at the 2022 Stu Sells 1824 Halifax Classic and a quarterfinal finish at the 2022 Masters. Lawes returned for the 2023 Canadian Open where the team missed the playoffs with a 2–3 record. At the 2023 Manitoba Scotties Tournament of Hearts, the team was eliminated in the semifinal after losing 8–5 to Abby Ackland. Despite this, they still qualified for the 2023 Scotties Tournament of Hearts as a Wild Card team. After a 5–3 record, they lost in a tiebreaker to Nova Scotia, skipped by Christina Black. The team finished the season at the 2023 Players' Championship and the 2023 Champions Cup, missing the playoffs at both.

Back together for the 2023–24 season, Team Lawes had promising results to begin the season. In October, they had two straight semifinal finishes at the 2023 PointsBet Invitational and the 2023 Players Open, losing out to Kerri Einarson and Anna Hasselborg respectively. At the first Slam of the season, the 2023 Tour Challenge, the team began with two straight losses before rallying together four straight victories to reach their first Grand Slam final as a unit. There, they lost 7–4 to Team Jones. They would miss the playoffs at the other four Slams that season, however. In November, they made the semifinals at the Red Deer Curling Classic where they fell 5–3 to Team Homan. They followed this up with a third-place finish at the 2023 Karuizawa International Curling Championships in Japan. Entering the 2024 Manitoba Scotties Tournament of Hearts as the top seeded team, Team Lawes lost just one game en route to claiming the provincial title, defeating Beth Peterson 9–8 in the championship game. This qualified them for the 2024 Scotties Tournament of Hearts where they did not have a good start, losing three of their first four games. Sitting 3–4 heading into their last round robin game, they were able to beat Northern Ontario's Krista McCarville 6–5. This created a five-way tie for third with Northern Ontario, British Columbia, Quebec, and Saskatchewan. With tiebreaker games abolished and the first tiebreaker (which was head-to-head between all tied teams) tied as well at 2–2, cumulative last stone draw distance between all the teams was used to decide who would make the playoffs. The Lawes rink finished first with a 231.6 and thus earned a spot in the playoffs. Facing Alberta's Selena Sturmay in the 3 vs. 4 page qualifier, the team lost 8–5 and were eliminated. They finished their season with a 1–4 record at the 2024 Players' Championship.

The 2024–25 season saw Team Lawes have their least successful year of the quad as after starting strong, they ended up falling out of qualification for Grand Slam events. To begin, however, the team reached three straight semifinals at the 2024 Saville Shootout, 2024 PointsBet Invitational and the 2024 Tour Challenge, losing to Team Homan at the latter two. Lawes then went on maternity leave and Njegovan again took over the team as skip. During this time, the team played in three events and only qualified at one of them, losing in the semifinals of the Saville Grand Prix to Kerri Einarson. With Lawes back in the lineup, the team missed three more consecutive playoffs, losing in a tiebreaker at the 2025 Masters to Satsuki Fujisawa. Having pre-qualified for the 2025 Scotties Tournament of Hearts due to their CTRS ranking from the 2023–24 season, Team Lawes lost three of their first four games to start the event 1–3. They then decided to make a change with Njegovan taking over skipping duties while Lawes remained throwing fourth stones. This move proved successful as the team won their next three games to remain in contention. Facing Team Einarson in their final round robin game, Team Lawes lost 9–6 and were eliminated from the event at 4–4. They ended the season ranked 19th, just outside of Grand Slam qualification.

Looking to turn things around for the final year of the Olympic quadrennial, the Lawes rink had a strong start to the season by winning their second event, the Saville Grand Prix. In the playoffs, they beat Kate Cameron in the quarterfinals before knocking off Korea's Gim Eun-ji and Park You-been in the semifinals and final respectively. They then played in the Tier 2 side of the 2025 Masters where they lost in the quarterfinals to Madeleine Dupont. In their next three events, Team Lawes struggled to find consistency, missing the playoffs at all three. This led them into the 2025 Canadian Olympic Curling Trials, which they directly qualified for through CTRS points. There, the team continued to see mixed results, finishing the round robin at 4–3. This tied them for third place, however, they missed out on the playoffs due to a poor Draw Shot Challenge (last stone draw). To wrap up 2025, the team had a strong run at the 2025 Canadian Open Tier 2, advancing to the finals where they were defeated by Taylor Reese-Hansen. In the new year, the team continued the season at the 2026 RME Women of the Rings Manitoba women's provincial. After a previously undefeated 7–0 record, Team Lawes fell 9–7 in the final game to Beth Peterson after Lawes' final shot for the win wrecked on a guard. However, due to Rachel Homan having to withdraw from the 2026 Scotties Tournament of Hearts as the Scotties schedule conflicted with the Olympics, an additional spot was instead given to Lawes as the highest CTRS ranked non-qualified team following the completion of all provincial and territorial championships. Peterman did not compete at the Scotties though as it conflicted with the mixed doubles tournament at the Olympics. She was replaced by Laura Walker, and the team went on to finish with a silver medal. On March 26, 2026, Team Lawes announced their disbandment. Peterman would later announce that she would be joining Team Kerri Einarson as the new lead, alongside Karlee Burgess as second and Shannon Birchard as third.

=== Mixed doubles ===
In April 2016, Peterman and teammate Brett Gallant won the 2016 Canadian Mixed Doubles Curling Trials after battling to a 12–8 win over Laura Crocker and Geoff Walker at the Nutana Curling Club in Saskatoon, Sask. The new champions were playing in their first Mixed Doubles event together. The pair played in the 2018 Canadian Mixed Doubles Curling Olympic Trials, going undefeated in group play, but lost to the eventual champion John Morris / Kaitlyn Lawes pairing in the semifinal. Peterman and Gallant also won the 2019 Canadian Mixed Doubles Curling Championship, defeating Nancy Martin and Tyrel Griffith in the final. The pair represented Canada at the 2019 World Mixed Doubles Curling Championship, where they won the silver medal after losing 6–5 to Sweden's Anna Hasselborg and Oskar Eriksson on the last rock. The duo returned to defend their championship title at the 2021 Canadian Mixed Doubles Curling Championship, as the 2020 championship was cancelled due to the pandemic. After finishing 5–1 through the round robin, they lost to Kadriana Sahaidak and Colton Lott in the round of 8, eliminating them from contention.

On March 2, 2022, Curling Canada announced that Peterman and Gallant would represent Canada at the 2022 World Mixed Doubles Curling Championship after the Canadian Mixed Doubles Championship was cancelled due to COVID. At the championship, the pair finished second in their pool with an 8–1 record, only suffering one loss to Scotland's Eve Muirhead and Bobby Lammie. This earned them a spot in the qualification game against Norway's Maia and Magnus Ramsfjell. After a tight game all the way through, Norway scored two in the final end to win the game 6–5, eliminating the Canadians in fifth place.

Peterman and Gallant went undefeated through the round robin of the 2023 Canadian Mixed Doubles Curling Championship with a 7–0 record. They then won both their quarterfinal and semifinal game to reach the final where they faced Jennifer Jones and Brent Laing. After a tight game all the way through, Jones and Laing scored five in the eighth end to win the game 9–4. Peterman and Gallant also competed in the 2024 Canadian Mixed Doubles Curling Championship, where they finished in third place.

By virtue of their third-place finish at the 2024 Canadian Mixed Doubles Championships, Peterman and Gallant qualified for the 2025 Canadian Mixed Doubles Curling Olympic Trials, where the team went undefeated, beating the team of Rachel Homan and Brendan Bottcher 8–7 in the final, qualifying her and Gallant for the 2025 World Mixed Doubles Curling Championship. At the 2025 Worlds, Peterman and Gallant would finish in 6th place, earning enough points to directly qualify them to represent Canada at the 2026 Winter Olympics.

== Personal life ==
She was a competitive softball player, having competed at the 2013 Canada Summer Games. She is the daughter of Lowell and Nancy and began curling at age 5. Her brother, Joel Peterman, won Gold in curling at the 2007 Canada Winter Games and has won two Canada Summer Games silver medals in baseball. She is married to her doubles partner, Brett Gallant, and they have one child. She graduated from the University of Calgary in 2015 with a bachelor's degree in kinesiology, and she studied at the Smith School of Business at Queen's University at Kingston. She is currently self employed.

She currently lives in Chestermere, Alberta.

== Teams ==
Season	Skip	Third	Second	Lead	Events
2006–07	Jocelyn Peterman	Brittany Tran	Lindsey More	Sarah More	
2007–08	Jocelyn Peterman	Brittany Tran	Lindsey More	Sarah More	
2008–09	Jocelyn Peterman	Brittany Tran	Lindsey More	Sarah More	2009 AJCC, U18 Opt. Int'l
2009–10	Jocelyn Peterman	Brittany Tran	Rebecca Konschuh	Kristine Anderson / Sarah More	2010 AG
2010–11	Jocelyn Peterman	Brittany Tran	Rebecca Konschuh	Kristine Anderson	2011 CWG
2011–12	Jocelyn Peterman	Brittany Tran	Rebecca Konschuh	Kristine Anderson	2012 CJCC, WJCC
2012–13	Jocelyn Peterman	Brittany Tran	Rebecca Konschuh	Kristine Anderson	
2013–14	Jocelyn Peterman	Brittany Tran	Rebecca Konschuh	Kristine Anderson	
2014–15	Heather Nedohin	Amy Nixon	Jocelyn Peterman	Laine Peters	2014 CC, 2015 Alta.
2015–16	Chelsea Carey	Amy Nixon	Jocelyn Peterman	Laine Peters	2016 Alta., STOH, WCC
2016–17	Chelsea Carey	Amy Nixon	Jocelyn Peterman	Laine Peters	2016 CC, 2017 STOH
2017–18	Chelsea Carey	Cathy Overton-Clapham	Jocelyn Peterman	Laine Peters	2017 COCT, 2018 Alta.
2018–19	Jennifer Jones	Kaitlyn Lawes	Jocelyn Peterman	Dawn McEwen	2018 CC, 2019 STOH
2019–20	Jennifer Jones	Kaitlyn Lawes	Jocelyn Peterman	Dawn McEwen	2019 CC, 2020 MB STOH, STOH
2020–21	Jennifer Jones	Kaitlyn Lawes	Jocelyn Peterman	Dawn McEwen / Lisa Weagle	2021 STOH
2021–22	Jennifer Jones	Kaitlyn Lawes	Jocelyn Peterman	Dawn McEwen / Lisa Weagle	2021 COCT, 2022 OG
2022–23	Kaitlyn Lawes	Selena Njegovan	Jocelyn Peterman	Kristin MacCuish	2023 MB STOH, STOH
2023–24	Kaitlyn Lawes	Selena Njegovan	Jocelyn Peterman	Kristin MacCuish	2024 MB STOH, STOH
2024–25	Kaitlyn Lawes	Selena Njegovan	Jocelyn Peterman	Kristin Gordon	2025 STOH
2025–26	Kaitlyn Lawes (Fourth)	Selena Njegovan (Skip)	Jocelyn Peterman	Kristin Gordon	2025 COCT, 2026 MB STOH
2026–27	Kerri Einarson	Shannon Birchard	Karlee Burgess	Jocelyn Peterman	
