= 2021 Champions Cup (curling) =

Grand Slam of Curling event

- Host city: Calgary, Alberta
- Arena: Markin MacPhail Centre, Canada Olympic Park
- Dates: April 15–19, 2021
- Men's winner: (Scotland) Team Mouat
- Curling club: Gogar Park CC, Edinburgh
- Skip: Bruce Mouat
- Third: Grant Hardie
- Second: Bobby Lammie
- Lead: Hammy McMillan Jr.
- Coach: Alan Hannah
- Finalist: (Alberta) Brendan Bottcher
- Women's winner: (Ontario) Team Homan
- Curling club: Ottawa CC, Ottawa
- Skip: Rachel Homan
- Third: Emma Miskew
- Second: Sarah Wilkes
- Lead: Joanne Courtney
- Finalist: (Switzerland) Silvana Tirinzoni

The 2021 Humpty's Champions Cup, a curling Grand Slam event, was held April 15–19, 2021 at the Markin MacPhail Centre at Canada Olympic Park in Calgary, Alberta. Two days before the event was supposed to begin on Monday, April 12, the organizers delayed its start time by one day due to the (false) positive COVID-19 tests from the 2021 World Men's Curling Championship, which was held at the same site from April 2–11.

Due to the COVID-19 pandemic in Canada, it was announced that both the Champions Cup and the Players' Championship Grand Slam of Curling events would still be held in the 2020–21 curling season but would move to a centralized "bubble" (similar to that of the NHL as in Edmonton) at Canada Olympic Park alongside Curling Canada's national championships. All events will be held behind closed doors with no spectators. Due to the pandemic, it is the first Grand Slam event to be held since the 2020 Canadian Open held in January 2020.

The event utilized the "no tick rule", an experimental rule in which any guard rock touching the centre line may not be moved off of the centre line by an opposing stone until the sixth rock of the end.

On the men's side, Bruce Mouat of Scotland won his second career Grand Slam by defeating Team Brendan Bottcher 6–3 in the final. Mouat previously won the 2017 Boost National.

On the women's side, Rachel Homan of Ottawa also won 6–3 in the final, doubling up on Team Silvana Tirinzoni of Switzerland. It was Homan's eleventh Grand Slam title.

== Qualification ==
The top 12 ranked men's and women's teams on the World Curling Federation's world team rankings qualified for the event. In the event that a team declines their invitation, the next-ranked team on the world team ranking is invited until the field is complete.

=== Men ===
Top world team ranking men's teams:

1. (Ontario) Brad Jacobs
2. (Ontario) John Epping
3. (Newfoundland and Labrador) Brad Gushue
4. (Alberta) Brendan Bottcher
5. (Scotland) Bruce Mouat
6. (Switzerland) Yannick Schwaller
7. (Manitoba) Mike McEwen
8. (Sweden) Niklas Edin
9. (Switzerland) Peter de Cruz
10. (Alberta) Kevin Koe
11. (Saskatchewan) Matt Dunstone
12. (Scotland) ~~Ross Paterson~~
13. (Manitoba) Jason Gunnlaugson

=== Women ===
Top world team ranking women's teams:

1. (Sweden) Anna Hasselborg
2. (Manitoba) Kerri Einarson
3. (Manitoba) Tracy Fleury
4. (Japan) Satsuki Fujisawa
5. (Manitoba) Jennifer Jones
6. (Switzerland) Elena Stern
7. (Switzerland) Silvana Tirinzoni
8. (Ontario) Rachel Homan
9. (Scotland) Eve Muirhead
10. (United States) Tabitha Peterson
11. (South Korea) Kim Min-ji
12. (Russia) Alina Kovaleva

== Format ==
The 12 qualifying teams were divided into two pools of 6. Each team plays four games against teams in their pool. The top six teams overall make the playoffs.

== Men ==
=== Teams ===
The teams are listed as follows:

Skip	Third	Second	Lead	Locale
Brendan Bottcher	Darren Moulding	Brad Thiessen	Karrick Martin	Edmonton, Alberta
Benoît Schwarz (Fourth)	Sven Michel	Peter de Cruz (Skip)	Valentin Tanner	Geneva, Switzerland
Matt Dunstone	Braeden Moskowy	Kirk Muyres	Dustin Kidby	Wadena, Saskatchewan
Niklas Edin	Oskar Eriksson	Rasmus Wranå	Christoffer Sundgren	Karlstad, Sweden
John Epping	Colton Lott (Note: Colton Lott is playing third on Team Epping as Ryan Fry is staying home due to family commitments.)	Mat Camm	Brent Laing	Toronto, Ontario
Jason Gunnlaugson	Adam Casey	Matt Wozniak	Connor Njegovan	Morris, Manitoba
Brad Gushue	Mark Nichols	Brett Gallant	Geoff Walker	St. John's, Newfoundland and Labrador
Brad Jacobs	Marc Kennedy	E. J. Harnden	Ryan Harnden	Sault Ste. Marie, Ontario
Kevin Koe	John Morris	B. J. Neufeld	Ben Hebert	Calgary, Alberta
Reid Carruthers	Tyler Tardi (Note: Tyler Tardi is playing third and Carruthers is skipping Team McEwen as Mike McEwen is staying home due to family commitments.)	Derek Samagalski	– (Note: Team McEwen is playing with three players this week, with their lead Colin Hodgson staying home due to the COVID-19 pandemic.)	Winnipeg, Manitoba
Bruce Mouat	Grant Hardie	Bobby Lammie	Hammy McMillan Jr.	Edinburgh, Scotland
Yannick Schwaller	Michael Brunner	Romano Meier	Marcel Käufeler	Bern, Switzerland

=== Round-robin standings ===
Final round-robin standings

Key
Teams to Playoffs
Teams to Tiebreakers

Pool A	W	L	PF	PA
(Newfoundland and Labrador) Brad Gushue	4	0	26	12
(Scotland) Bruce Mouat	3	1	23	18
(Ontario) Brad Jacobs	2	2	18	19
(Saskatchewan) Matt Dunstone (Note: Only one tiebreaker match could be played, forcing Team Dunstone, who had the lowest draw shot challenge score to miss the playoffs.)	2	2	20	18
(Manitoba) Team McEwen	1	3	17	24
(Switzerland) Peter de Cruz	0	4	15	28

Pool B	W	L	PF	PA
(Alberta) Brendan Bottcher	3	1	20	16
(Alberta) Kevin Koe	3	1	24	14
(Sweden) Niklas Edin	3	1	20	12
(Switzerland) Yannick Schwaller	2	2	21	17
(Ontario) John Epping	1	3	16	25
(Manitoba) Jason Gunnlaugson	0	4	9	26

=== Round-robin results ===
All draw times are listed in Mountain Daylight Time (UTC−06:00).

==== Draw 1 ====
Thursday, April 15, 8:00 am

Sheet B	1	2	3	4	5	6	7	8	Final
(Manitoba) Jason Gunnlaugson 🔨	0	0	1	0	2	0	0	0	3
(Ontario) John Epping	0	0	0	3	0	1	1	3	8

Sheet C	1	2	3	4	5	6	7	8	Final
(Switzerland) Yannick Schwaller 🔨	1	0	0	0	2	0	1	0	4
(Alberta) Brendan Bottcher	0	1	0	1	0	2	0	2	6

Sheet D	1	2	3	4	5	6	7	8	Final
(Sweden) Niklas Edin	1	0	0	0	1	X	X	X	2
(Alberta) Kevin Koe 🔨	0	5	0	1	0	X	X	X	6

==== Draw 2 ====
Thursday, April 15, 12:00 pm

Sheet C	1	2	3	4	5	6	7	8	Final
(Scotland) Bruce Mouat 🔨	2	0	1	0	0	1	0	2	6
(Switzerland) Peter de Cruz	0	1	0	1	1	0	1	0	4

Sheet D	1	2	3	4	5	6	7	8	Final
(Newfoundland and Labrador) Brad Gushue 🔨	2	1	0	2	0	0	0	X	5
(Saskatchewan) Matt Dunstone	0	0	1	0	0	0	1	X	2

==== Draw 3 ====
Thursday, April 15, 4:00 pm

Sheet A	1	2	3	4	5	6	7	8	9	Final
(Manitoba) Team McEwen	0	1	1	0	0	0	0	1	0	3
(Ontario) Brad Jacobs 🔨	1	0	0	2	0	0	0	0	1	4

==== Draw 4 ====
Thursday, April 15, 8:00 pm

Sheet A	1	2	3	4	5	6	7	8	Final
(Alberta) Brendan Bottcher 🔨	2	3	1	0	3	X	X	X	9
(Ontario) John Epping	0	0	0	2	0	X	X	X	2

Sheet B	1	2	3	4	5	6	7	8	Final
(Switzerland) Yannick Schwaller 🔨	2	0	3	0	0	0	1	X	6
(Alberta) Kevin Koe	0	1	0	1	0	1	0	X	3

Sheet C	1	2	3	4	5	6	7	8	Final
(Manitoba) Jason Gunnlaugson	0	0	0	0	1	0	X	X	1
(Sweden) Niklas Edin 🔨	3	1	1	1	0	1	X	X	7

==== Draw 5 ====
Friday, April 16, 8:00 am

Sheet D	1	2	3	4	5	6	7	8	Final
(Manitoba) Team McEwen 🔨	1	0	0	2	0	1	0	0	4
(Scotland) Bruce Mouat	0	1	0	0	4	0	0	2	7

==== Draw 6 ====
Friday, April 16, 12:00 pm

Sheet D	1	2	3	4	5	6	7	8	Final
(Manitoba) Jason Gunnlaugson	0	1	0	0	2	0	X	X	3
(Switzerland) Yannick Schwaller 🔨	1	0	2	3	0	2	X	X	8

==== Draw 7 ====
Friday, April 16, 4:00 pm

Sheet A	1	2	3	4	5	6	7	8	Final
(Saskatchewan) Matt Dunstone	0	0	1	1	1	0	0	0	3
(Scotland) Bruce Mouat 🔨	2	1	0	0	0	1	1	1	6

Sheet B	1	2	3	4	5	6	7	8	Final
(Switzerland) Peter de Cruz 🔨	0	2	0	1	0	1	0	X	4
(Manitoba) Team McEwen	1	0	2	0	2	0	3	X	8

Sheet C	1	2	3	4	5	6	7	8	Final
(Ontario) Brad Jacobs	0	0	0	1	0	0	X	X	1
(Newfoundland and Labrador) Brad Gushue 🔨	0	3	2	0	2	1	X	X	8

Sheet D	1	2	3	4	5	6	7	8	Final
(Alberta) Brendan Bottcher 🔨	0	1	0	1	0	X	X	X	2
(Alberta) Kevin Koe	0	0	3	0	5	X	X	X	8

==== Draw 8 ====
Friday, April 16, 8:00 pm

Sheet B	1	2	3	4	5	6	7	8	Final
(Ontario) John Epping	0	0	0	2	0	0	0	X	2
(Sweden) Niklas Edin 🔨	2	2	0	0	0	1	1	X	6

==== Draw 9 ====
Saturday, April 17, 8:00 am

Sheet A	1	2	3	4	5	6	7	8	Final
(Newfoundland and Labrador) Brad Gushue 🔨	0	1	1	0	1	0	2	1	6
(Switzerland) Peter de Cruz	2	0	0	1	0	2	0	0	5

Sheet B	1	2	3	4	5	6	7	8	9	Final
(Saskatchewan) Matt Dunstone	0	3	1	0	1	0	0	0	1	6
(Ontario) Brad Jacobs 🔨	2	0	0	1	0	1	0	1	0	5

==== Draw 10 ====
Saturday, April 17, 12:00 pm

Sheet C	1	2	3	4	5	6	7	8	Final
(Ontario) John Epping	0	0	1	0	2	0	1	0	4
(Alberta) Kevin Koe 🔨	1	2	0	1	0	2	0	1	7

Sheet D	1	2	3	4	5	6	7	8	9	Final
(Manitoba) Jason Gunnlaugson	0	1	0	0	0	0	0	0	0	2
(Alberta) Brendan Bottcher 🔨	1	0	0	1	0	0	0	0	1	3

==== Draw 12 ====
Saturday, April 17, 8:00 pm

Sheet A	1	2	3	4	5	6	7	8	Final
(Switzerland) Yannick Schwaller	0	1	0	0	1	0	0	1	3
(Sweden) Niklas Edin 🔨	1	0	2	0	0	2	0	0	5

Sheet B	1	2	3	4	5	6	7	8	Final
(Newfoundland and Labrador) Brad Gushue 🔨	2	0	2	0	1	1	0	1	7
(Scotland) Bruce Mouat	0	1	0	2	0	0	1	0	4

Sheet C	1	2	3	4	5	6	7	8	Final
(Saskatchewan) Matt Dunstone	0	0	3	0	1	5	X	X	9
(Manitoba) Team McEwen 🔨	0	1	0	1	0	0	X	X	2

Sheet D	1	2	3	4	5	6	7	8	Final
(Ontario) Brad Jacobs 🔨	0	2	0	3	0	3	X	X	8
(Switzerland) Peter de Cruz	0	0	1	0	1	0	X	X	2

=== Tiebreaker ===
Sunday, April 18, 12:00 pm

Sheet D	1	2	3	4	5	6	7	8	Final
(Ontario) Brad Jacobs	1	0	2	1	0	2	0	X	6
(Switzerland) Yannick Schwaller 🔨	0	1	0	0	2	0	1	X	4

Player percentages
(Ontario) Team Jacobs		(Switzerland) Team Schwaller	
Ryan Harnden	94%	Marcel Käufeler	92%
E. J. Harnden	95%	Romano Meier	84%
Marc Kennedy	97%	Michael Brunner	95%
Brad Jacobs	98%	Yannick Schwaller	78%
Total	96%	Total	88%

=== Playoffs ===
Quarterfinals
4	(Sweden) Niklas Edin	5
5	(Scotland) Bruce Mouat	6
3	(Alberta) Kevin Koe	5
6	(Ontario) Brad Jacobs	3

Semifinals
1	(Newfoundland and Labrador) Brad Gushue	4
5	(Scotland) Bruce Mouat	5
2	(Alberta) Brendan Bottcher	6
3	(Alberta) Kevin Koe	2

Final
5	(Scotland) Bruce Mouat	6
2	(Alberta) Brendan Bottcher	3

==== Quarterfinals ====
Sunday, April 18, 4:00 pm

Sheet C	1	2	3	4	5	6	7	8	Final
(Alberta) Kevin Koe 🔨	0	3	0	0	1	0	0	1	5
(Ontario) Brad Jacobs	1	0	1	0	0	1	0	0	3

Player percentages
(Alberta) Team Koe		(Ontario) Team Jacobs	
Ben Hebert	88%	Ryan Harnden	92%
B. J. Neufeld	84%	E. J. Harnden	81%
John Morris	91%	Marc Kennedy	81%
Kevin Koe	78%	Brad Jacobs	84%
Total	85%	Total	85%

Sheet D	1	2	3	4	5	6	7	8	Final
(Sweden) Niklas Edin 🔨	2	0	2	0	1	0	0	0	5
(Scotland) Bruce Mouat	0	2	0	1	0	1	1	1	6

Player percentages
(Sweden) Team Edin		(Scotland) Team Mouat	
Christoffer Sundgren	94%	Hammy McMillan Jr.	94%
Rasmus Wranå	73%	Bobby Lammie	61%
Oskar Eriksson	73%	Grant Hardie	80%
Niklas Edin	84%	Bruce Mouat	94%
Total	81%	Total	82%

==== Semifinals ====
Sunday, April 18, 8:00 pm

Sheet A	1	2	3	4	5	6	7	8	Final
(Alberta) Brendan Bottcher	1	0	0	1	0	0	4	X	6
(Alberta) Kevin Koe 🔨	0	0	1	0	1	0	0	X	2

Player percentages
(Alberta) Team Bottcher		(Alberta) Team Koe	
Karrick Martin	95%	Ben Hebert	96%
Brad Thiessen	86%	B. J. Neufeld	75%
Darren Moulding	93%	John Morris	79%
Brendan Bottcher	91%	Kevin Koe	93%
Total	91%	Total	86%

Sheet B	1	2	3	4	5	6	7	8	Final
(Newfoundland and Labrador) Brad Gushue 🔨	1	1	0	0	1	0	1	0	4
(Scotland) Bruce Mouat	0	0	1	0	0	2	0	2	5

Player percentages
(Newfoundland and Labrador) Team Gushue		(Scotland) Team Mouat	
Geoff Walker	95%	Hammy McMillan Jr.	88%
Brett Gallant	91%	Bobby Lammie	70%
Mark Nichols	64%	Grant Hardie	73%
Brad Gushue	81%	Bruce Mouat	83%
Total	83%	Total	79%

==== Final ====
Monday, April 19, 12:00 pm

Sheet C	1	2	3	4	5	6	7	8	Final
(Scotland) Bruce Mouat	0	1	0	2	2	0	1	X	6
(Alberta) Brendan Bottcher 🔨	2	0	1	0	0	0	0	X	3

Player percentages
(Scotland) Team Mouat		(Alberta) Team Bottcher	
Hammy McMillan Jr.	91%	Karrick Martin	97%
Bobby Lammie	81%	Brad Thiessen	83%
Grant Hardie	81%	Darren Moulding	66%
Bruce Mouat	92%	Brendan Bottcher	67%
Total	86%	Total	79%

== Women ==
=== Teams ===
The teams are listed as follows:

Skip	Third	Second	Lead	Alternate	Locale
Kerri Einarson	Val Sweeting	Shannon Birchard	Briane Meilleur		Gimli, Manitoba
Tracy Fleury	Selena Njegovan	Liz Fyfe	Kristin MacCuish		East St. Paul, Manitoba
Satsuki Fujisawa	Chinami Yoshida	Yumi Suzuki	Yurika Yoshida		Kitami, Japan
Anna Hasselborg	Sara McManus	Agnes Knochenhauer	Sofia Mabergs		Sundbyberg, Sweden
Rachel Homan	Emma Miskew	Sarah Wilkes	Joanne Courtney	Laura Walker (Note: After originally announcing that Laura Walker would spare as third for Team Homan as Rachel Homan was expecting her second child, Homan returned to the team in time for the event, shifting Walker to alternate.)	Ottawa, Ontario
Jennifer Jones	Kaitlyn Lawes	Jocelyn Peterman	Lisa Weagle		Winnipeg, Manitoba
Kim Min-ji	Kim Hye-rin	Ha Seung-youn	Kim Su-jin	Yang Tae-i	Chuncheon, South Korea
Alina Kovaleva	Yulia Portunova (Note: Yulia Portunova is replacing Maria Komarova on Team Kovaleva, who is skipping the team at the Russian Curling Championships.)	Galina Arsenkina	Ekaterina Kuzmina		Saint Petersburg, Russia
Eve Muirhead	Vicky Wright	Jennifer Dodds	Lauren Gray		Stirling, Scotland
Tabitha Peterson	Nina Roth	Becca Hamilton	Tara Peterson	Aileen Geving	Chaska, United States
Briar Hürlimann (Fourth)	Elena Stern (Skip)	Lisa Gisler	Céline Koller		Brig, Switzerland
Alina Pätz (Fourth)	Silvana Tirinzoni (Skip)	Esther Neuenschwander	Melanie Barbezat		Aarau, Switzerland

=== Round-robin standings ===
Final round-robin standings

Key
Teams to Playoffs
Teams to Tiebreakers

Pool A	W	L	PF	PA
(Manitoba) Kerri Einarson	4	0	28	9
(Ontario) Rachel Homan	3	1	26	18
(Japan) Satsuki Fujisawa	2	2	17	22
(Russia) Alina Kovaleva	2	2	27	25
(United States) Tabitha Peterson	1	3	12	26
(Switzerland) Elena Stern	0	4	17	27

Pool B	W	L	PF	PA
(Manitoba) Tracy Fleury	4	0	29	22
(Switzerland) Silvana Tirinzoni	3	1	20	21
(South Korea) Kim Min-ji	2	2	25	26
(Scotland) Eve Muirhead	2	2	26	22
(Manitoba) Jennifer Jones	1	3	23	25
(Sweden) Anna Hasselborg	0	4	22	29

=== Round-robin results ===
All draw times are listed in Mountain Daylight Time (UTC−06:00).

==== Draw 1 ====
Thursday, April 15, 8:00 am

Sheet A	1	2	3	4	5	6	7	8	Final
(Manitoba) Kerri Einarson 🔨	0	0	1	0	1	0	0	4	6
(Ontario) Rachel Homan	0	0	0	1	0	1	1	0	3

==== Draw 2 ====
Thursday, April 15, 12:00 pm

Sheet A	1	2	3	4	5	6	7	8	Final
(Sweden) Anna Hasselborg	0	0	2	0	1	0	2	0	5
(Scotland) Eve Muirhead 🔨	0	1	0	2	0	2	0	1	6

Sheet B	1	2	3	4	5	6	7	8	Final
(Manitoba) Tracy Fleury	0	0	3	0	1	1	0	X	5
(South Korea) Kim Min-ji 🔨	0	0	0	1	0	0	2	X	3

==== Draw 3 ====
Thursday, April 15, 4:00 pm

Sheet B	1	2	3	4	5	6	7	8	Final
(Japan) Satsuki Fujisawa	0	3	0	0	1	1	0	X	5
(Russia) Alina Kovaleva 🔨	3	0	2	1	0	0	3	X	9

Sheet C	1	2	3	4	5	6	7	8	Final
(Ontario) Rachel Homan 🔨	1	0	3	0	1	1	1	X	7
(Switzerland) Elena Stern	0	2	0	1	0	0	0	X	3

Sheet D	1	2	3	4	5	6	7	8	Final
(Switzerland) Silvana Tirinzoni 🔨	1	0	1	0	0	0	3	X	5
(Manitoba) Jennifer Jones	0	1	0	1	0	1	0	X	3

==== Draw 4 ====
Thursday, April 15, 8:00 pm

Sheet D	1	2	3	4	5	6	7	8	Final
(Manitoba) Kerri Einarson 🔨	4	2	0	2	0	1	X	X	9
(United States) Tabitha Peterson	0	0	1	0	1	0	X	X	2

==== Draw 5 ====
Friday, April 16, 8:00 am

Sheet A	1	2	3	4	5	6	7	8	9	Final
(Manitoba) Tracy Fleury 🔨	2	0	2	0	1	0	1	0	1	7
(Manitoba) Jennifer Jones	0	3	0	1	0	1	0	1	0	6

Sheet B	1	2	3	4	5	6	7	8	Final
(Switzerland) Silvana Tirinzoni 🔨	0	3	0	0	0	0	0	X	3
(Scotland) Eve Muirhead	1	0	2	1	1	1	3	X	9

Sheet C	1	2	3	4	5	6	7	8	Final
(Sweden) Anna Hasselborg	0	1	0	2	1	0	3	0	7
(South Korea) Kim Min-ji 🔨	3	0	2	0	0	1	0	2	8

==== Draw 6 ====
Friday, April 16, 12:00 pm

Sheet A	1	2	3	4	5	6	7	8	Final
(Russia) Alina Kovaleva	0	0	2	0	0	3	0	2	7
(Ontario) Rachel Homan 🔨	2	3	0	0	1	0	2	0	8

Sheet B	1	2	3	4	5	6	7	8	Final
(United States) Tabitha Peterson 🔨	2	0	0	0	2	0	2	X	6
(Switzerland) Elena Stern	0	1	1	1	0	1	0	X	4

Sheet C	1	2	3	4	5	6	7	8	Final
(Manitoba) Kerri Einarson 🔨	2	0	3	0	1	2	X	X	8
(Japan) Satsuki Fujisawa	0	1	0	1	0	0	X	X	2

==== Draw 8 ====
Friday, April 16, 8:00 pm

Sheet A	1	2	3	4	5	6	7	8	Final
(Switzerland) Silvana Tirinzoni 🔨	1	2	2	0	0	1	0	1	7
(South Korea) Kim Min-ji	0	0	0	3	1	0	2	0	6

Sheet C	1	2	3	4	5	6	7	8	Final
(Scotland) Eve Muirhead	0	2	0	0	0	3	0	0	5
(Manitoba) Jennifer Jones 🔨	1	0	1	2	1	0	1	1	7

Sheet D	1	2	3	4	5	6	7	8	9	Final
(Sweden) Anna Hasselborg 🔨	2	0	0	1	0	2	0	2	0	7
(Manitoba) Tracy Fleury	0	3	1	0	1	0	2	0	3	10

==== Draw 9 ====
Saturday, April 17, 8:00 am

Sheet C	1	2	3	4	5	6	7	8	9	Final
(Russia) Alina Kovaleva	1	2	0	1	1	0	2	0	2	9
(Switzerland) Elena Stern 🔨	0	0	3	0	0	3	0	1	0	7

Sheet D	1	2	3	4	5	6	7	8	Final
(Japan) Satsuki Fujisawa	0	0	1	0	2	0	1	1	5
(United States) Tabitha Peterson 🔨	0	1	0	0	0	1	0	0	2

==== Draw 10 ====
Saturday, April 17, 12:00 pm

Sheet A	1	2	3	4	5	6	7	8	9	Final
(Scotland) Eve Muirhead	0	1	0	0	0	3	0	2	0	6
(Manitoba) Tracy Fleury 🔨	2	0	0	2	1	0	1	0	1	7

Sheet B	1	2	3	4	5	6	7	8	Final
(Sweden) Anna Hasselborg	0	0	0	0	1	0	2	X	3
(Switzerland) Silvana Tirinzoni 🔨	0	0	1	1	0	3	0	X	5

==== Draw 11 ====
Saturday, April 17, 4:00 pm

Sheet A	1	2	3	4	5	6	7	8	Final
(Japan) Satsuki Fujisawa	0	1	1	0	2	0	0	1	5
(Switzerland) Elena Stern 🔨	1	0	0	1	0	1	0	0	3

Sheet B	1	2	3	4	5	6	7	8	Final
(Manitoba) Kerri Einarson	1	1	0	0	3	0	0	X	5
(Russia) Alina Kovaleva 🔨	0	0	0	1	0	0	1	X	2

Sheet C	1	2	3	4	5	6	7	8	Final
(United States) Tabitha Peterson 🔨	0	0	1	0	1	X	X	X	2
(Ontario) Rachel Homan	1	3	0	4	0	X	X	X	8

Sheet D	1	2	3	4	5	6	7	8	9	Final
(Manitoba) Jennifer Jones	0	2	1	0	0	3	0	1	0	7
(South Korea) Kim Min-ji 🔨	2	0	0	2	1	0	2	0	1	8

=== Tiebreakers ===
Sunday, April 18, 12:00 pm

Sheet B	1	2	3	4	5	6	7	8	Final
(Scotland) Eve Muirhead	0	0	0	3	0	1	0	X	4
(Japan) Satsuki Fujisawa 🔨	0	2	1	0	1	0	3	X	7

Player percentages
(Scotland) Team Muirhead		(Japan) Team Fujisawa	
Lauren Gray	83%	Yurika Yoshida	83%
Jennifer Dodds	67%	Yumi Suzuki	73%
Vicky Wright	69%	Chinami Yoshida	67%
Eve Muirhead	61%	Satsuki Fujisawa	77%
Total	70%	Total	75%

Sheet C	1	2	3	4	5	6	7	8	Final
(South Korea) Kim Min-ji	0	1	0	0	1	0	0	X	2
(Russia) Alina Kovaleva 🔨	2	0	1	0	0	0	1	X	4

Player percentages
(South Korea) Team Kim		(Russia) Team Kovaleva	
Kim Su-jin	89%	Ekaterina Kuzmina	94%
Ha Seung-youn	72%	Galina Arsenkina	75%
Kim Hye-rin	72%	Yulia Portunova	70%
Kim Min-ji	78%	Alina Kovaleva	94%
Total	78%	Total	83%

=== Playoffs ===
Quarterfinals
4	(Ontario) Rachel Homan	5
5	(Japan) Satsuki Fujisawa	4
3	(Switzerland) Silvana Tirinzoni	8
6	(Russia) Alina Kovaleva	7

Semifinals
1	(Manitoba) Kerri Einarson	3
4	(Ontario) Rachel Homan	5
2	(Manitoba) Tracy Fleury	4
3	(Switzerland) Silvana Tirinzoni	7

Final
4	(Ontario) Rachel Homan	6
3	(Switzerland) Silvana Tirinzoni	3

==== Quarterfinals ====
Sunday, April 18, 4:00 pm

Sheet A	1	2	3	4	5	6	7	8	Final
(Ontario) Rachel Homan 🔨	0	2	0	0	2	0	0	1	5
(Japan) Satsuki Fujisawa	0	0	1	0	0	2	1	0	4

Player percentages
(Ontario) Team Homan		(Japan) Team Fujisawa	
Joanne Courtney	80%	Yurika Yoshida	88%
Sarah Wilkes	92%	Yumi Suzuki	81%
Emma Miskew	72%	Chinami Yoshida	86%
Rachel Homan	89%	Satsuki Fujisawa	84%
Total	83%	Total	85%

Sheet B	1	2	3	4	5	6	7	8	9	Final
(Switzerland) Silvana Tirinzoni 🔨	1	2	0	1	0	2	1	0	1	8
(Russia) Alina Kovaleva	0	0	2	0	3	0	0	2	0	7

Player percentages
(Switzerland) Team Tirinzoni		(Russia) Team Kovaleva	
Melanie Barbezat	94%	Ekaterina Kuzmina	90%
Esther Neuenschwander	83%	Galina Arsenkina	83%
Silvana Tirinzoni	78%	Yulia Portunova	81%
Alina Pätz	76%	Alina Kovaleva	78%
Total	83%	Total	83%

==== Semifinals ====
Sunday, April 18, 8:00 pm

Sheet C	1	2	3	4	5	6	7	8	Final
(Manitoba) Kerri Einarson 🔨	0	2	0	0	0	0	1	0	3
(Ontario) Rachel Homan	0	0	3	0	0	0	0	2	5

Player percentages
(Manitoba) Team Einarson		(Ontario) Team Homan	
Briane Meilleur	84%	Joanne Courtney	92%
Shannon Birchard	66%	Sarah Wilkes	75%
Val Sweeting	75%	Emma Miskew	80%
Kerri Einarson	77%	Rachel Homan	83%
Total	75%	Total	83%

Sheet D	1	2	3	4	5	6	7	8	Final
(Manitoba) Tracy Fleury 🔨	0	2	0	1	1	0	0	0	4
(Switzerland) Silvana Tirinzoni	0	0	2	0	0	2	2	1	7

Player percentages
(Manitoba) Team Fleury		(Switzerland) Team Tirinzoni	
Kristin MacCuish	78%	Melanie Barbezat	92%
Liz Fyfe	80%	Esther Neuenschwander	82%
Selena Njegovan	72%	Silvana Tirinzoni	67%
Tracy Fleury	73%	Alina Pätz	83%
Total	76%	Total	81%

==== Final ====
Monday, April 19, 4:00 pm

Sheet C	1	2	3	4	5	6	7	8	Final
(Ontario) Rachel Homan 🔨	1	0	2	0	1	0	1	1	6
(Switzerland) Silvana Tirinzoni	0	1	0	1	0	1	0	0	3

Player percentages
(Ontario) Team Homan		(Switzerland) Team Tirinzoni	
Joanne Courtney	84%	Melanie Barbezat	84%
Sarah Wilkes	84%	Esther Neuenschwander	70%
Emma Miskew	84%	Silvana Tirinzoni	70%
Rachel Homan	80%	Alina Pätz	72%
Total	83%	Total	74%
