= 2012 Canadian Junior Curling Championships =

Curling tournament in Ontario

2012 M&M Meat Shops Canadian Junior Curling Championships
- Host city: Napanee, Ontario
- Arena: Strathcona Paper Centre; Napanee & District Curling Club
- Dates: February 4–12
- Men's winner: Alberta
- Curling club: Saville Sports Centre, Edmonton
- Skip: Brendan Bottcher
- Third: Evan Asmussen
- Second: Landon Bucholz
- Lead: Bryce Bucholz
- Finalist: Northern Ontario (Brennan Wark)
- Women's winner: Alberta
- Curling club: Red Deer Curling Club, Red Deer
- Skip: Jocelyn Peterman
- Third: Brittany Tran
- Second: Rebecca Konschuh
- Lead: Kristine Anderson
- Finalist: Manitoba (Shannon Birchard)

The 2012 M&M Meat Shops Canadian Junior Curling Championships were held from February 4 to 12 at the Strathcona Paper Centre and the Napanee & District Curling Club in Napanee, Ontario. The winners, the Albertan teams skipped by Brendan Bottcher and Jocelyn Peterman, represented Canada at the 2012 World Junior Curling Championships in Östersund, Sweden.

In the women's final, Alberta's Peterman led her team to a win over Manitoba's Shannon Birchard in nine ends, winning with a score of 12–6 after a decisive shot in the fourth end and a critical steal in the fifth end gave Alberta a large lead. The men's final saw Alberta's Brendan Bottcher sealing off the game against Northern Ontario's Brennan Wark in the last end with two points, making the final score 9–6 and completing an Alberta sweep of the Canadian Juniors.

== Men ==
=== Teams ===
Teams are listed as follows:

Province	Skip	Third	Second	Lead	Locale
Alberta	Brendan Bottcher	Evan Asmussen	Landon Bucholz	Bryce Bucholz	Saville Sports Centre, Edmonton
British Columbia	Josh Hozack	Corey Chester	Nolan Reid	Zachary Capron	Victoria Curling Club, Victoria
Manitoba	Kyle Doering	Colton Lott	Derek Oryniak	Lucas Van Den Bosch	West Kildonan Curling Club, Winnipeg
New Brunswick	Josh Barry	Kerry MacLean	Chris MacRae	Andrew O'Dell	Capital Winter Club, Fredericton
Newfoundland and Labrador	Colin Thomas	Spencer Wicks	Stephen Trickett	Brendan Murphy	RE/MAX Centre, St. John's
Northern Ontario	Brennan Wark	Kristofer Leupen	Kyle Toset	Joel Adams	Port Arthur Curling Club, Thunder Bay
Northwest Territories	Daniel Murray	Matthew Miller	TC Ibey	Randy Hiebert	Yellowknife Curling Club, Yellowknife
Nova Scotia	Stuart Thompson	Scott Babin	Alex MacNeil	Paul Weingartshofer	Mayflower Curling Club, Halifax
Ontario	Brett DeKoning	Jason Whitehill	Scott Dow	Brett Spier	Omemee Curling Club, Omemee
Prince Edward Island	Chris Gallant (fourth)	Alex Matters (skip)	Kyle Holland	Andrew Cameron	Charlottetown Curling Club, Charlottetown
Quebec	Félix Asselin	Marc-Alexandre Charest-Dion	Lewis South	Sami Guimond-Jabert	Glenmore Curling Club, Dollard-des-Ormeaux
Saskatchewan	Brady Scharback	Quinn Hersikorn	Jacob Hersikorn	Brady Kendel	Saskatoon-Granite Curling Club, Saskatoon
Yukon	Thomas Scoffin	Mitchell Young	David Aho	Will Mahoney	Whitehorse Curling Club, Whitehorse

=== Round-robin standings ===
Final round-robin standings

Key
Teams to Playoffs
Teams to Tiebreaker

Province	Skip	W	L
Alberta	Brendan Bottcher	11	1
Northern Ontario	Brennan Wark	9	3
Manitoba	Kyle Doering	9	3
Nova Scotia	Stuart Thompson	9	3
Saskatchewan	Brady Scharback	7	5
Yukon	Thomas Scoffin	7	5
Quebec	Félix Asselin	7	5
Ontario	Brett DeKoning	6	6
New Brunswick	Josh Barry	5	7
Prince Edward Island	Alex Matters	3	9
Northwest Territories	Daniel Murray	2	10
Newfoundland and Labrador	Colin Thomas	2	10
British Columbia	Josh Hozack	1	11

=== Round-robin results ===
Sheets A through E are located at the Strathcona Paper Centre, and sheets F through H are located at the Napanee & District Curling Club. All times listed are in Eastern Standard Time.

==== Draw 1 ====
Saturday, February 4, 10:00 am

Sheet B	1	2	3	4	5	6	7	8	9	10	Final
British Columbia (Hozack)	0	0	0	1	0	0	0	1	X	X	2
Alberta (Bottcher) 🔨	2	0	0	0	2	0	3	0	X	X	7

Sheet C	1	2	3	4	5	6	7	8	9	10	Final
Quebec (Asselin)	0	2	0	0	1	1	0	0	0	1	5
Ontario (DeKoning) 🔨	0	0	0	0	0	0	1	0	1	0	2

Sheet H	1	2	3	4	5	6	7	8	9	10	Final
New Brunswick (Barry)	1	0	2	0	0	0	2	0	0	1	6
Newfoundland and Labrador (Thomas) 🔨	0	1	0	1	0	0	0	1	1	0	4

==== Draw 2 ====
Saturday, February 4, 2:30 pm

Sheet B	1	2	3	4	5	6	7	8	9	10	11	Final
Yukon (Scoffin)	0	3	0	0	1	0	1	0	0	2	0	7
Nova Scotia (Thompson) 🔨	0	0	1	1	0	2	0	3	0	0	1	8

Sheet D	1	2	3	4	5	6	7	8	9	10	Final
Manitoba (Doering)	0	0	1	0	1	0	0	0	1	0	3
Northern Ontario (Wark) 🔨	0	1	0	0	0	0	3	1	0	0	5

Sheet F	1	2	3	4	5	6	7	8	9	10	Final
Saskatchewan (Scharback)	0	0	0	2	0	2	0	0	X	X	4
Alberta (Bottcher) 🔨	1	0	3	0	2	0	3	1	X	X	10

Sheet G	1	2	3	4	5	6	7	8	9	10	Final
Northwest Territories (Murray)	0	0	1	0	0	0	1	0	X	X	2
Prince Edward Island (Matters) 🔨	2	1	0	4	2	1	0	1	X	X	11

==== Draw 3 ====
Saturday, February 4, 7:00 pm

Sheet B	1	2	3	4	5	6	7	8	9	10	11	Final
Newfoundland and Labrador (Thomas)	1	0	0	0	1	0	1	1	0	2	0	5
Ontario (DeKoning) 🔨	0	0	0	1	0	2	0	0	1	0	1	6

Sheet C	1	2	3	4	5	6	7	8	9	10	Final
New Brunswick (Barry)	0	0	0	0	2	0	1	0	0	0	3
Saskatchewan (Scharback) 🔨	0	0	0	1	0	1	0	1	0	2	5

Sheet H	1	2	3	4	5	6	7	8	9	10	11	Final
Quebec (Asselin)	1	2	0	0	0	1	0	1	0	0	1	6
British Columbia (Hozack) 🔨	0	0	0	0	2	0	1	0	1	1	0	5

==== Draw 4 ====
Sunday, February 5, 10:00 am

Sheet B	1	2	3	4	5	6	7	8	9	10	Final
Northwest Territories (Murray)	0	0	1	0	0	1	0	0	X	X	2
Manitoba (Doering) 🔨	0	6	0	5	1	0	0	1	X	X	13

Sheet D	1	2	3	4	5	6	7	8	9	10	Final
Alberta (Bottcher)	3	1	0	6	0	0	1	X	X	X	11
Prince Edward Island (Matters) 🔨	0	0	1	0	1	0	0	X	X	X	2

Sheet E	1	2	3	4	5	6	7	8	9	10	Final
Yukon (Scoffin)	0	0	0	4	0	2	4	X	X	X	10
British Columbia (Hozack) 🔨	0	1	2	0	1	0	0	X	X	X	4

Sheet H	1	2	3	4	5	6	7	8	9	10	Final
Northern Ontario (Wark) 🔨	1	0	1	0	2	0	1	0	1	1	7
Nova Scotia (Thompson)	0	1	0	1	0	1	0	1	0	0	4

==== Draw 5 ====
Sunday, February 5, 2:30 pm

Sheet A	1	2	3	4	5	6	7	8	9	10	Final
New Brunswick (Barry) 🔨	1	0	2	0	2	0	0	0	0	0	5
Quebec (Asselin)	0	2	0	2	0	1	0	1	0	1	7

Sheet D	1	2	3	4	5	6	7	8	9	10	Final
Newfoundland and Labrador (Thomas)	0	0	1	0	1	0	0	0	X	X	2
Nova Scotia (Thompson) 🔨	0	4	0	2	0	1	0	1	X	X	8

Sheet E	1	2	3	4	5	6	7	8	9	10	Final
Ontario (DeKoning) 🔨	1	0	0	0	0	0	1	0	0	X	2
Manitoba (Doering)	0	0	0	0	0	3	0	3	1	X	7

Sheet H	1	2	3	4	5	6	7	8	9	10	Final
Saskatchewan (Scharback) 🔨	2	0	1	1	0	2	0	0	1	X	7
Yukon (Scoffin)	0	1	0	0	1	0	0	0	0	X	2

==== Draw 6 ====
Sunday, February 5, 7:00 pm

Sheet A	1	2	3	4	5	6	7	8	9	10	Final
British Columbia (Hozack) 🔨	0	0	1	0	0	2	0	1	0	X	4
Northern Ontario (Wark)	0	0	0	2	2	0	1	0	4	X	9

Sheet D	1	2	3	4	5	6	7	8	9	10	Final
Quebec (Asselin) 🔨	2	2	1	0	2	0	0	0	3	X	10
Northwest Territories (Murray)	0	0	0	2	0	0	1	1	0	X	4

Sheet E	1	2	3	4	5	6	7	8	9	10	Final
Prince Edward Island (Matters) 🔨	0	1	0	0	0	2	0	X	X	X	3
Newfoundland and Labrador (Thomas)	0	0	2	4	1	0	2	X	X	X	9

Sheet H	1	2	3	4	5	6	7	8	9	10	Final
Ontario (DeKoning)	0	0	1	0	0	1	0	0	X	X	2
Alberta (Bottcher) 🔨	0	3	0	1	1	0	3	0	X	X	8

==== Draw 7 ====
Monday, February 6, 10:00 am

Sheet A	1	2	3	4	5	6	7	8	9	10	Final
Saskatchewan (Scharback) 🔨	1	0	0	1	0	4	0	0	0	X	6
Nova Scotia (Thompson)	0	1	0	0	1	0	2	2	4	X	10

Sheet C	1	2	3	4	5	6	7	8	9	10	Final
Northern Ontario (Wark) 🔨	0	0	2	0	1	1	0	1	0	0	5
Yukon (Scoffin)	0	1	0	1	0	0	1	0	0	4	7

Sheet F	1	2	3	4	5	6	7	8	9	10	11	Final
New Brunswick (Barry) 🔨	0	2	1	0	0	0	1	1	1	0	1	7
Northwest Territories (Murray)	0	0	0	1	3	1	0	0	0	1	0	6

Sheet H	1	2	3	4	5	6	7	8	9	10	Final
Manitoba (Doering)	0	0	2	0	0	1	0	2	0	3	8
Prince Edward Island (Matters) 🔨	0	1	0	1	1	0	0	0	2	0	5

==== Draw 8 ====
Monday, February 6, 2:30 pm

Sheet A	1	2	3	4	5	6	7	8	9	10	Final
Northwest Territories (Murray) 🔨	1	0	1	0	0	0	0	X	X	X	2
Ontario (DeKoning)	0	3	0	2	0	2	1	X	X	X	8

Sheet C	1	2	3	4	5	6	7	8	9	10	11	Final
Prince Edward Island (Matters) 🔨	0	1	0	0	3	1	0	2	0	0	1	8
British Columbia (Hozack)	1	0	0	2	0	0	3	0	0	1	0	7

Sheet E	1	2	3	4	5	6	7	8	9	10	Final
Alberta (Bottcher)	1	0	0	0	4	0	1	4	X	X	10
Northern Ontario (Wark) 🔨	0	0	1	0	0	2	0	0	X	X	3

Sheet G	1	2	3	4	5	6	7	8	9	10	Final
Newfoundland and Labrador (Thomas) 🔨	0	1	0	1	0	3	0	3	0	X	8
Quebec (Asselin)	0	0	2	0	1	0	1	0	1	X	5

==== Draw 9 ====
Monday, February 6, 7:00 pm

Sheet A	1	2	3	4	5	6	7	8	9	10	Final
Manitoba (Doering)	0	0	0	2	0	0	2	0	2	1	7
Newfoundland and Labrador (Thomas) 🔨	0	0	2	0	1	1	0	1	0	0	5

Sheet D	1	2	3	4	5	6	7	8	9	10	Final
Saskatchewan (Scharback) 🔨	2	0	0	0	2	0	0	1	1	1	7
Ontario (DeKoning)	0	0	1	1	0	1	1	0	0	0	4

Sheet F	1	2	3	4	5	6	7	8	9	10	Final
Yukon (Scoffin) 🔨	0	0	1	1	2	0	3	X	X	X	7
Quebec (Asselin)	0	0	0	0	0	1	0	X	X	X	1

Sheet G	1	2	3	4	5	6	7	8	9	10	Final
Nova Scotia (Thompson) 🔨	1	0	2	0	0	2	0	0	1	0	6
New Brunswick (Barry)	0	1	0	0	1	0	0	1	0	0	3

==== Draw 10 ====
Tuesday, February 7, 10:00 am

Sheet B	1	2	3	4	5	6	7	8	9	10	Final
Quebec (Asselin) 🔨	0	1	3	0	1	0	2	0	X	X	7
Northern Ontario (Wark)	0	0	0	0	0	2	0	1	X	X	3

Sheet C	1	2	3	4	5	6	7	8	9	10	Final
Newfoundland and Labrador (Thomas)	0	0	0	0	0	1	0	1	1	0	3
Alberta (Bottcher) 🔨	0	1	0	1	1	0	1	0	0	0	4

Sheet F	1	2	3	4	5	6	7	8	9	10	Final
Prince Edward Island (Matters)	0	0	0	2	0	1	0	0	1	0	4
Ontario (DeKoning) 🔨	0	0	1	0	1	0	2	0	0	1	5

Sheet G	1	2	3	4	5	6	7	8	9	10	Final
British Columbia (Hozack) 🔨	1	0	1	1	0	0	0	0	0	0	3
Northwest Territories (Murray)	0	1	0	0	0	0	1	1	0	1	4

==== Draw 11 ====
Tuesday, February 7, 3:30 pm

Sheet A	1	2	3	4	5	6	7	8	9	10	Final
Prince Edward Island (Matters) 🔨	0	1	0	1	0	0	0	2	0	0	4
Yukon (Scoffin)	0	0	2	0	2	0	0	0	3	0	7

Sheet C	1	2	3	4	5	6	7	8	9	10	Final
Manitoba (Doering)	0	1	1	0	2	1	2	0	1	0	8
New Brunswick (Barry) 🔨	2	0	0	1	0	0	0	2	0	2	7

Sheet E	1	2	3	4	5	6	7	8	9	10	Final
Northwest Territories (Murray)	0	0	0	0	0	1	1	0	X	X	2
Nova Scotia (Thompson) 🔨	1	3	1	0	1	0	0	3	X	X	9

Sheet G	1	2	3	4	5	6	7	8	9	10	Final
Saskatchewan (Scharback) 🔨	0	0	1	0	0	2	0	0	1	0	4
Northern Ontario (Wark)	0	1	0	2	1	0	1	1	0	0	6

==== Draw 12 ====
Tuesday, February 7, 7:00 pm

Sheet B	1	2	3	4	5	6	7	8	9	10	Final
Ontario (DeKoning) 🔨	3	0	2	2	0	1	0	3	0	X	11
New Brunswick (Barry)	0	2	0	0	2	0	2	0	3	X	9

Sheet C	1	2	3	4	5	6	7	8	9	10	Final
Nova Scotia (Thompson)	1	2	0	0	5	0	3	X	X	X	11
Quebec (Asselin) 🔨	0	0	1	0	0	1	0	X	X	X	2

Sheet F	1	2	3	4	5	6	7	8	9	10	Final
Newfoundland and Labrador (Thomas) 🔨	1	0	0	1	1	0	0	0	0	0	3
British Columbia (Hozack)	0	1	0	0	0	0	0	3	0	1	5

Sheet G	1	2	3	4	5	6	7	8	9	10	11	Final
Manitoba (Doering)	0	1	2	0	0	1	0	1	0	0	4	9
Alberta (Bottcher) 🔨	2	0	0	0	0	0	2	0	0	1	0	5

==== Draw 13 ====
Wednesday, February 8, 10:00 am

Sheet B	1	2	3	4	5	6	7	8	9	10	Final
Manitoba (Doering)	0	0	0	1	0	2	2	0	1	1	7
Saskatchewan (Scharback) 🔨	0	0	3	0	1	0	0	1	0	0	5

Sheet C	1	2	3	4	5	6	7	8	9	10	11	Final
Yukon (Scoffin) 🔨	0	2	0	0	1	0	1	0	2	0	1	7
Newfoundland and Labrador (Thomas)	2	0	1	0	0	1	0	1	0	1	0	6

Sheet F	1	2	3	4	5	6	7	8	9	10	Final
Alberta (Bottcher) 🔨	0	1	0	2	0	0	2	0	1	0	6
Nova Scotia (Thompson)	0	0	1	0	2	0	0	0	0	0	3

Sheet G	1	2	3	4	5	6	7	8	9	10	Final
New Brunswick (Barry)	2	1	0	0	0	2	0	0	0	2	7
British Columbia (Hozack) 🔨	0	0	0	2	1	0	1	1	0	0	5

==== Draw 14 ====
Wednesday, February 8, 2:30 pm

Sheet A	1	2	3	4	5	6	7	8	9	10	Final
Ontario (DeKoning)	0	0	3	0	1	0	0	4	X	X	8
British Columbia (Hozack) 🔨	0	1	0	1	0	0	1	0	X	X	3

Sheet D	1	2	3	4	5	6	7	8	9	10	Final
Northwest Territories (Murray) 🔨	0	0	0	0	2	1	0	2	4	X	9
Newfoundland and Labrador (Thomas)	0	1	0	1	0	0	2	0	0	X	4

Sheet E	1	2	3	4	5	6	7	8	9	10	Final
Northern Ontario (Wark) 🔨	0	1	1	0	3	0	0	4	X	X	9
Prince Edward Island (Matters)	0	0	0	1	0	1	1	0	X	X	3

Sheet H	1	2	3	4	5	6	7	8	9	10	Final
Alberta (Bottcher)	1	0	1	0	0	0	0	2	0	1	5
Quebec (Asselin) 🔨	0	1	0	0	1	1	0	0	1	0	4

==== Draw 15 ====
Wednesday, February 8, 7:00 pm

Sheet A	1	2	3	4	5	6	7	8	9	10	Final
Northern Ontario (Wark)	2	0	3	0	3	0	3	X	X	X	11
Northwest Territories (Murray) 🔨	0	1	0	1	0	1	0	X	X	X	3

Sheet C	1	2	3	4	5	6	7	8	9	10	Final
Saskatchewan (Scharback) 🔨	1	0	1	0	1	0	1	1	0	0	5
Prince Edward Island (Matters)	0	0	0	1	0	3	0	0	0	2	6

Sheet E	1	2	3	4	5	6	7	8	9	10	11	Final
New Brunswick (Barry)	0	0	2	0	1	0	1	0	2	0	2	8
Yukon (Scoffin) 🔨	1	0	0	1	0	2	0	1	0	1	0	6

Sheet H	1	2	3	4	5	6	7	8	9	10	11	Final
Nova Scotia (Thompson)	1	0	1	0	0	0	1	0	1	1	0	5
Manitoba (Doering) 🔨	0	2	0	1	1	1	0	0	0	0	1	6

==== Draw 16 ====
Thursday, February 9, 10:00 am

Sheet A	1	2	3	4	5	6	7	8	9	10	Final
Nova Scotia (Thompson)	0	1	0	3	1	1	0	2	0	X	8
Prince Edward Island (Matters) 🔨	2	0	2	0	0	0	1	0	1	X	6

Sheet C	1	2	3	4	5	6	7	8	9	10	11	Final
Ontario (DeKoning) 🔨	0	1	0	0	0	2	0	1	0	0	0	4
Northern Ontario (Wark)	0	0	1	1	0	0	1	0	0	1	2	6

Sheet F	1	2	3	4	5	6	7	8	9	10	Final
Quebec (Asselin) 🔨	1	0	2	0	1	0	2	0	0	1	7
Manitoba (Doering)	0	2	0	1	0	0	0	2	1	0	6

Sheet H	1	2	3	4	5	6	7	8	9	10	11	Final
Yukon (Scoffin) 🔨	0	1	0	0	1	0	3	0	3	0	2	10
Northwest Territories (Murray)	3	0	1	1	0	1	0	1	0	1	0	8

==== Draw 17 ====
Thursday, February 9, 3:30 pm

Sheet B	1	2	3	4	5	6	7	8	9	10	Final
Northern Ontario (Wark)	0	1	1	2	0	1	0	3	0	X	8
Newfoundland and Labrador (Thomas) 🔨	0	0	0	0	2	0	2	0	2	X	6

Sheet C	1	2	3	4	5	6	7	8	9	10	Final
Alberta (Bottcher)	0	0	4	0	0	2	0	3	X	X	9
Northwest Territories (Murray) 🔨	1	1	0	1	0	0	1	0	X	X	4

Sheet E	1	2	3	4	5	6	7	8	9	10	11	Final
British Columbia (Hozack)	0	0	0	2	0	1	0	2	0	0	0	5
Saskatchewan (Scharback) 🔨	0	1	1	0	1	0	1	0	0	1	1	6

Sheet H	1	2	3	4	5	6	7	8	9	10	Final
Prince Edward Island (Matters)	1	0	0	0	1	0	0	X	X	X	2
New Brunswick (Barry) 🔨	0	1	5	3	0	0	1	X	X	X	10

==== Draw 18 ====
Thursday, February 9, 7:00 pm

Sheet B	1	2	3	4	5	6	7	8	9	10	Final
Alberta (Bottcher)	0	0	1	1	2	0	3	0	0	X	7
Yukon (Scoffin) 🔨	0	1	0	0	0	1	0	0	1	X	3

Sheet C	1	2	3	4	5	6	7	8	9	10	Final
British Columbia (Hozack)	0	0	0	0	0	2	0	0	1	0	3
Manitoba (Doering) 🔨	0	0	0	0	1	0	2	1	0	1	5

Sheet E	1	2	3	4	5	6	7	8	9	10	Final
Nova Scotia (Thompson)	0	2	1	0	2	2	0	X	X	X	7
Ontario (DeKoning) 🔨	1	0	0	0	0	0	1	X	X	X	2

Sheet G	1	2	3	4	5	6	7	8	9	10	Final
Quebec (Asselin)	0	0	0	1	2	0	1	0	0	0	4
Saskatchewan (Scharback) 🔨	0	1	0	0	0	1	0	0	2	1	5

==== Draw 19 ====
Friday, February 10, 8:00 am

Sheet A	1	2	3	4	5	6	7	8	9	10	Final
Alberta (Bottcher)	1	0	1	0	3	1	0	2	0	X	8
New Brunswick (Barry) 🔨	0	0	0	1	0	0	3	0	1	X	5

Sheet D	1	2	3	4	5	6	7	8	9	10	11	Final
Nova Scotia (Thompson)	0	0	1	0	0	5	0	0	0	0	2	8
British Columbia (Hozack) 🔨	0	0	0	2	1	0	0	1	1	1	0	6

Sheet F	1	2	3	4	5	6	7	8	9	10	Final
Yukon (Scoffin)	0	0	1	0	0	1	0	2	0	X	4
Ontario (DeKoning) 🔨	3	0	0	1	1	0	2	0	2	X	9

Sheet G	1	2	3	4	5	6	7	8	9	10	Final
Northwest Territories (Murray)	0	1	0	1	2	1	0	0	1	X	6
Saskatchewan (Scharback) 🔨	3	0	3	0	0	0	0	3	0	X	9

==== Draw 20 ====
Friday, February 10, 1:00 pm

Sheet B	1	2	3	4	5	6	7	8	9	10	Final
Prince Edward Island (Matters) 🔨	0	0	1	0	0	2	0	3	0	X	6
Quebec (Asselin)	1	1	0	2	2	0	2	0	1	X	9

Sheet D	1	2	3	4	5	6	7	8	9	10	Final
Yukon (Scoffin) 🔨	0	0	2	1	0	0	0	2	0	0	5
Manitoba (Doering)	0	0	0	0	1	1	1	0	1	0	4

Sheet F	1	2	3	4	5	6	7	8	9	10	Final
Northern Ontario (Wark) 🔨	3	0	4	0	1	0	2	0	2	X	12
New Brunswick (Barry)	0	2	0	1	0	2	0	2	0	X	7

Sheet H	1	2	3	4	5	6	7	8	9	10	11	Final
Newfoundland and Labrador (Thomas)	0	0	1	1	1	0	1	1	0	1	0	6
Saskatchewan (Scharback) 🔨	0	1	0	0	0	3	0	0	2	0	1	7

=== Tiebreaker ===
Saturday, February 11, 2:00 pm

Sheet B	1	2	3	4	5	6	7	8	9	10	Final
Manitoba (Doering) 🔨	1	0	5	0	0	1	1	0	1	X	9
Nova Scotia (Thompson)	0	2	0	0	1	0	0	1	0	X	4

Player percentages
Manitoba		Nova Scotia	
Lucas Van Den Bosch	81%	Paul Weingartshofer	90%
Derek Oryniak	76%	Alex MacNeil	75%
Colton Lott	82%	Scott Babin	58%
Kyle Doering	79%	Stuart Thompson	71%
Total	80%	Total	74%

=== Playoffs ===
Semifinal			Final
			1	Alberta	9
2	Northern Ontario	7	2	Northern Ontario	6
3	Manitoba	3

==== Semifinal ====
Sunday, February 12, 1:00 pm

Sheet C	1	2	3	4	5	6	7	8	9	10	Final
Northern Ontario (Wark) 🔨	0	0	3	0	0	2	0	0	2	X	7
Manitoba (Doering)	0	0	0	1	1	0	0	1	0	X	3

Player percentages
Manitoba		Northern Ontario	
Lucas Van Den Bosch	79%	Joel Adams	71%
Derek Oryniak	75%	Kyle Toset	90%
Colton Lott	67%	Kristofer Leupen	68%
Kyle Doering	69%	Brennan Wark	69%
Total	73%	Total	75%

==== Final ====
Sunday, February 12, 7:00 pm

Sheet C	1	2	3	4	5	6	7	8	9	10	Final
Alberta (Bottcher) 🔨	2	1	0	0	2	0	2	0	0	2	9
Northern Ontario (Wark)	0	0	2	1	0	2	0	1	0	0	6

Player percentages
Alberta		Northern Ontario	
Bryce Bucholz	76%	Joel Adams	83%
Landon Bucholz	75%	Kyle Toset	69%
Evan Asmussen	75%	Kristofer Leupen	71%
Brendan Bottcher	89%	Brennan Wark	71%
Total	79%	Total	73%

== Women ==
=== Teams ===
Teams are listed as follows:

Province	Skip	Third	Second	Lead	Locale
Alberta	Jocelyn Peterman	Brittany Tran	Rebecca Konschuh	Kristine Anderson	Red Deer Curling Centre, Red Deer
British Columbia	Kesa Van Osch	Kalia Van Osch	Marika Van Osch	Brooklyn Leitch	Nanaimo Curling Centre, Nanaimo
Manitoba	Selena Kaatz (fourth)	Shannon Birchard (skip)	Kristin MacCuish	Mariah Mondor	St. Vital Curling Club Winnipeg
New Brunswick	Jennifer Armstrong	Marissa Gale	Jessica Moore	Shelby Wilson	Riverside Country Club, Rothesay
Newfoundland and Labrador	Erica Trickett	Carolyn Suley	Jessica Cunningham	Nicole Noseworthy	RE/MAX Centre, St. John's
Northern Ontario	Kendra Lilly	Crystal Lillico	Courtney Chenier	Avery Thomas	Idylwylde Golf and Curling Club, Sudbury
Northwest Territories	Taryn Williams	Janis O'Keefe	Paige Elkin	Katharine Thomas	Yellowknife Curling Club, Yellowknife
Nova Scotia	Emily Dwyer	Amanda Colter	Katrina MacKinnon	Laura Kennedy	Mayflower Curling Club, Halifax
Ontario	Jamie Sinclair	Holly Donaldson	Chantal Allan	Casandra Raganold	Manotick Curling Center, Manotick
Prince Edward Island	Sarah Fullerton	Michelle McQuaid	Sara MacRae	Hillary Thompson	Charlottetown Curling Club, Charlottetown; Cornwall Curling Club, Cornwall
Quebec	Roxane Perron	Mélanie Poirier	Roxane Poirier	Fanny Cantin	Club de curling Victoria; Club de curling Etchemin, Quebec City
Saskatchewan	Kristen Streifel	Elyse Lafrance	Brie Spilchen	Karlee Korchinski	Nutana Curling Club, Saskatoon
Yukon	Sarah Koltun	Chelsea Duncan	Linea Eby	Jenna Duncan	Whitehorse Curling Club, Whitehorse

=== Round-robin standings ===
Final round-robin standings

Key
Teams to Playoffs

Province	Skip	W	L
Manitoba	Shannon Birchard	10	2
Alberta	Jocelyn Peterman	10	2
British Columbia	Kesa Van Osch	8	4
Ontario	Jamie Sinclair	7	5
Nova Scotia	Emily Dwyer	7	5
Saskatchewan	Kristen Streifel	6	6
Northern Ontario	Kendra Lilly	6	6
Prince Edward Island	Sarah Fullerton	6	6
New Brunswick	Jennifer Armstrong	5	7
Quebec	Roxane Perron	4	8
Yukon	Sarah Koltun	4	8
Newfoundland and Labrador	Erica Trickett	3	9
Northwest Territories	Taryn Williams	2	10

=== Round-robin results ===
Sheets A through E are located at the Strathcona Paper Centre, and sheets F through H are located at the Napanee & District Curling Club. All times listed are in Eastern Standard Time.

==== Draw 1 ====
Saturday, February 4, 10:00 am

Sheet A	1	2	3	4	5	6	7	8	9	10	Final
British Columbia (Van Osch)	1	0	2	0	0	2	0	1	0	2	8
Alberta (Peterman) 🔨	0	1	0	1	1	0	2	0	4	0	9

Sheet D	1	2	3	4	5	6	7	8	9	10	Final
Quebec (Perron)	0	0	1	0	3	0	1	1	0	1	7
Ontario (Sinclair) 🔨	0	0	0	2	0	2	0	0	1	0	5

Sheet G	1	2	3	4	5	6	7	8	9	10	Final
New Brunswick (Armstrong)	0	0	3	0	0	0	0	0	1	0	4
Newfoundland and Labrador (Trickett) 🔨	2	0	0	0	0	0	1	1	0	2	6

==== Draw 2 ====
Saturday, February 4, 2:30 pm

Sheet A	1	2	3	4	5	6	7	8	9	10	Final
Yukon (Koltun)	0	1	0	2	0	0	1	4	0	X	8
Nova Scotia (Dwyer) 🔨	0	0	1	0	1	1	0	0	1	X	4

Sheet C	1	2	3	4	5	6	7	8	9	10	Final
Manitoba (Birchard)	1	0	1	1	0	0	1	0	0	2	6
Northern Ontario (Lilly) 🔨	0	1	0	0	1	2	0	0	1	0	5

Sheet E	1	2	3	4	5	6	7	8	9	10	Final
Saskatchewan (Streifel)	0	1	0	0	0	1	0	X	X	X	2
Alberta (Peterman) 🔨	4	0	3	1	1	0	2	X	X	X	11

Sheet H	1	2	3	4	5	6	7	8	9	10	Final
Northwest Territories (Williams)	0	0	2	0	2	0	0	0	0	X	4
Prince Edward Island (Fullerton) 🔨	2	2	0	2	0	2	1	1	1	X	11

==== Draw 3 ====
Saturday, February 4, 7:00 pm

Sheet A	1	2	3	4	5	6	7	8	9	10	Final
Newfoundland and Labrador (Trickett) 🔨	0	0	1	0	0	1	0	0	X	X	2
Ontario (Sinclair)	1	1	0	1	1	0	2	3	X	X	9

Sheet D	1	2	3	4	5	6	7	8	9	10	Final
New Brunswick (Armstrong)	0	2	1	0	0	0	0	3	0	1	7
Saskatchewan (Streifel) 🔨	0	0	0	1	1	1	1	0	1	0	5

Sheet G	1	2	3	4	5	6	7	8	9	10	Final
Quebec (Perron)	0	0	1	0	1	0	3	0	0	0	5
British Columbia (Van Osch) 🔨	2	0	0	0	0	1	0	3	1	3	10

==== Draw 4 ====
Sunday, February 5, 10:00 am

Sheet A	1	2	3	4	5	6	7	8	9	10	Final
Northwest Territories (Williams) 🔨	0	0	0	2	0	0	0	0	2	X	4
Manitoba (Birchard)	1	1	1	0	0	0	2	1	0	X	6

Sheet C	1	2	3	4	5	6	7	8	9	10	Final
Alberta (Peterman)	0	3	1	0	3	0	1	0	1	X	9
Prince Edward Island (Fullerton) 🔨	1	0	0	1	0	1	0	1	0	X	4

Sheet F	1	2	3	4	5	6	7	8	9	10	Final
Yukon (Koltun) 🔨	1	0	0	0	2	0	1	0	2	1	7
British Columbia (Van Osch)	0	0	1	0	0	2	0	5	0	0	8

Sheet G	1	2	3	4	5	6	7	8	9	10	Final
Northern Ontario (Lilly)	0	0	1	0	1	0	2	1	1	0	6
Nova Scotia (Dwyer) 🔨	2	1	0	1	0	3	0	0	0	2	9

==== Draw 5 ====
Sunday, February 5, 2:30 pm

Sheet B	1	2	3	4	5	6	7	8	9	10	Final
New Brunswick (Armstrong) 🔨	0	0	0	1	0	0	2	0	1	1	5
Quebec (Perron)	0	0	0	0	0	1	0	2	0	0	3

Sheet C	1	2	3	4	5	6	7	8	9	10	Final
Newfoundland and Labrador (Trickett)	0	0	1	1	1	0	1	0	1	0	5
Nova Scotia (Dwyer) 🔨	0	0	0	0	0	4	0	2	0	1	7

Sheet F	1	2	3	4	5	6	7	8	9	10	Final
Ontario (Sinclair)	1	0	1	0	0	3	1	0	0	1	7
Manitoba (Birchard)	0	1	0	1	0	0	0	2	1	0	5

Sheet G	1	2	3	4	5	6	7	8	9	10	Final
Saskatchewan (Streifel) 🔨	0	1	0	3	1	1	0	1	1	X	8
Yukon (Koltun)	1	0	0	0	0	0	1	0	0	X	2

==== Draw 6 ====
Sunday, February 5, 7:00 pm

Sheet B	1	2	3	4	5	6	7	8	9	10	Final
British Columbia (Van Osch) 🔨	0	0	1	0	0	4	0	2	0	1	8
Northern Ontario (Lilly)	0	0	0	0	1	0	3	0	2	0	6

Sheet C	1	2	3	4	5	6	7	8	9	10	Final
Quebec (Perron) 🔨	0	1	1	0	1	0	3	2	0	1	9
Northwest Territories (Williams)	0	0	0	2	0	2	0	0	1	0	5

Sheet F	1	2	3	4	5	6	7	8	9	10	11	Final
Prince Edward Island (Fullerton) 🔨	0	1	0	1	0	0	1	0	2	0	1	6
Newfoundland and Labrador (Trickett)	1	0	0	0	1	0	0	2	0	1	0	5

Sheet G	1	2	3	4	5	6	7	8	9	10	Final
Ontario (Sinclair) 🔨	1	2	0	0	1	0	0	2	0	X	6
Alberta (Peterman)	0	0	2	3	0	2	1	0	1	X	9

==== Draw 7 ====
Monday, February 6, 10:00 am

Sheet B	1	2	3	4	5	6	7	8	9	10	Final
Saskatchewan (Streifel)	0	0	1	1	0	0	0	0	X	X	2
Nova Scotia (Dwyer) 🔨	2	0	0	0	1	1	1	2	X	X	7

Sheet D	1	2	3	4	5	6	7	8	9	10	Final
Northern Ontario (Lilly) 🔨	0	0	4	0	0	1	0	0	0	0	5
Yukon (Koltun)	0	0	0	3	1	0	1	1	1	0	7

Sheet E	1	2	3	4	5	6	7	8	9	10	Final
New Brunswick (Armstrong) 🔨	2	0	0	1	3	0	4	0	3	X	13
Northwest Territories (Williams)	0	1	0	0	0	1	0	3	0	X	5

Sheet G	1	2	3	4	5	6	7	8	9	10	Final
Manitoba (Birchard)	0	0	0	1	0	1	0	1	1	1	5
Prince Edward Island (Fullerton) 🔨	0	1	0	0	1	0	1	0	0	0	3

==== Draw 8 ====
Monday, February 6, 2:30 pm

Sheet B	1	2	3	4	5	6	7	8	9	10	Final
Northwest Territories (Williams)	1	0	0	1	0	0	0	0	2	X	4
Ontario (Sinclair) 🔨	0	1	0	0	2	1	1	2	0	X	7

Sheet D	1	2	3	4	5	6	7	8	9	10	Final
Prince Edward Island (Fullerton)	2	0	0	0	2	0	0	0	0	X	4
British Columbia (Van Osch) 🔨	0	0	0	2	0	2	3	2	0	X	9

Sheet F	1	2	3	4	5	6	7	8	9	10	Final
Alberta (Peterman)	0	1	2	4	0	2	0	3	X	X	12
Northern Ontario (Lilly) 🔨	0	0	0	0	3	0	2	0	X	X	5

Sheet H	1	2	3	4	5	6	7	8	9	10	Final
Newfoundland and Labrador (Trickett)	0	0	3	0	0	3	0	0	1	2	9
Quebec (Perron) 🔨	0	1	0	0	1	0	3	0	0	0	5

==== Draw 9 ====
Monday, February 6, 7:00 pm

Sheet B	1	2	3	4	5	6	7	8	9	10	Final
Manitoba (Birchard)	0	0	1	0	3	0	0	1	0	4	9
Newfoundland and Labrador (Trickett) 🔨	1	0	0	1	0	0	3	0	1	0	6

Sheet C	1	2	3	4	5	6	7	8	9	10	Final
Saskatchewan (Streifel) 🔨	2	1	0	0	1	0	0	1	0	2	7
Ontario (Sinclair)	0	0	2	1	0	1	0	0	2	0	6

Sheet E	1	2	3	4	5	6	7	8	9	10	Final
Yukon (Koltun)	0	0	0	2	0	3	0	0	1	0	6
Quebec (Perron) 🔨	2	0	1	0	1	0	0	1	0	3	8

Sheet H	1	2	3	4	5	6	7	8	9	10	Final
Nova Scotia (Dwyer)	0	0	1	1	3	0	2	0	0	0	7
New Brunswick (Armstrong) 🔨	1	0	0	0	0	2	0	1	1	0	5

==== Draw 10 ====
Tuesday, February 7, 10:00 am

Sheet A	1	2	3	4	5	6	7	8	9	10	Final
Quebec (Perron) 🔨	1	1	0	0	0	1	0	2	1	0	6
Northern Ontario (Lilly)	0	0	1	2	1	0	1	0	0	2	7

Sheet D	1	2	3	4	5	6	7	8	9	10	11	Final
Newfoundland and Labrador (Trickett) 🔨	2	1	1	2	0	1	0	0	0	2	0	9
Alberta (Peterman)	0	0	0	0	2	0	3	1	3	0	1	10

Sheet E	1	2	3	4	5	6	7	8	9	10	Final
Prince Edward Island (Fullerton)	2	0	0	1	0	1	3	0	0	4	11
Ontario (Sinclair) 🔨	0	1	1	0	2	0	0	1	1	0	6

Sheet H	1	2	3	4	5	6	7	8	9	10	Final
British Columbia (Van Osch) 🔨	4	0	2	0	3	0	0	X	X	X	9
Northwest Territories (Williams)	0	1	0	1	0	1	0	X	X	X	3

==== Draw 11 ====
Tuesday, February 7, 2:30 pm

Sheet B	1	2	3	4	5	6	7	8	9	10	Final
Prince Edward Island (Fullerton) 🔨	1	0	1	0	1	0	0	2	0	0	5
Yukon (Koltun)	0	3	0	1	0	3	1	0	1	0	9

Sheet D	1	2	3	4	5	6	7	8	9	10	Final
Manitoba (Birchard)	0	1	0	1	0	1	0	1	0	X	4
New Brunswick (Armstrong) 🔨	2	0	1	0	2	0	2	0	1	X	8

Sheet F	1	2	3	4	5	6	7	8	9	10	Final
Northwest Territories (Williams) 🔨	1	0	2	1	0	1	0	3	1	1	10
Nova Scotia (Dwyer)	0	6	0	0	1	0	2	0	0	0	9

Sheet H	1	2	3	4	5	6	7	8	9	10	Final
Saskatchewan (Streifel) 🔨	0	0	0	1	1	0	0	1	0	1	4
Northern Ontario (Lilly)	0	0	1	0	0	1	1	0	0	0	3

==== Draw 12 ====
Tuesday, February 7, 7:00 pm

Sheet A	1	2	3	4	5	6	7	8	9	10	Final
Ontario (Sinclair) 🔨	1	0	0	2	2	0	0	1	0	3	9
New Brunswick (Armstrong)	0	0	2	0	0	0	1	0	2	0	5

Sheet D	1	2	3	4	5	6	7	8	9	10	Final
Nova Scotia (Dwyer) 🔨	3	0	1	1	0	2	0	3	1	X	11
Quebec (Perron)	0	1	0	0	5	0	1	0	0	X	7

Sheet E	1	2	3	4	5	6	7	8	9	10	Final
Newfoundland and Labrador (Trickett)	0	0	0	0	1	1	1	0	0	X	3
British Columbia (Van Osch) 🔨	2	0	1	2	0	0	0	3	4	X	12

Sheet H	1	2	3	4	5	6	7	8	9	10	Final
Manitoba (Birchard) 🔨	0	0	2	2	2	0	0	2	0	1	9
Alberta (Peterman)	1	1	0	0	0	1	1	0	1	0	5

==== Draw 13 ====
Wednesday, February 8, 10:00 am

Sheet A	1	2	3	4	5	6	7	8	9	10	Final
Manitoba (Birchard) 🔨	3	0	1	0	1	0	1	0	1	0	7
Saskatchewan (Streifel)	0	0	0	1	0	2	0	1	0	0	4

Sheet D	1	2	3	4	5	6	7	8	9	10	Final
Yukon (Koltun)	0	1	0	1	1	0	0	1	1	1	6
Newfoundland and Labrador (Trickett) 🔨	0	0	3	0	0	0	2	0	0	0	5

Sheet E	1	2	3	4	5	6	7	8	9	10	11	Final
Alberta (Peterman)	2	0	0	1	0	1	0	1	1	1	0	7
Nova Scotia (Dwyer) 🔨	0	2	0	0	2	0	3	0	0	0	1	8

Sheet H	1	2	3	4	5	6	7	8	9	10	Final
New Brunswick (Armstrong)	0	0	1	0	1	0	0	X	X	X	2
British Columbia (Van Osch) 🔨	2	1	0	2	0	3	2	X	X	X	10

==== Draw 14 ====
Wednesday, February 8, 2:30 pm

Sheet B	1	2	3	4	5	6	7	8	9	10	Final
Ontario (Sinclair) 🔨	0	2	0	0	1	0	0	1	2	0	6
British Columbia (Van Osch)	0	0	1	1	0	1	0	0	0	1	4

Sheet C	1	2	3	4	5	6	7	8	9	10	Final
Northwest Territories (Williams)	0	0	1	0	2	0	1	1	0	X	5
Newfoundland and Labrador (Trickett) 🔨	3	3	0	2	0	1	0	0	2	X	11

Sheet F	1	2	3	4	5	6	7	8	9	10	Final
Northern Ontario (Lilly)	1	1	1	0	2	0	1	0	0	1	7
Prince Edward Island (Fullerton) 🔨	0	0	0	1	0	1	0	2	1	0	5

Sheet G	1	2	3	4	5	6	7	8	9	10	Final
Alberta (Peterman) 🔨	2	3	0	1	0	2	0	1	0	X	9
Quebec (Perron)	0	0	1	0	2	0	1	0	0	X	4

==== Draw 15 ====
Wednesday, February 8, 7:00 pm

Sheet B	1	2	3	4	5	6	7	8	9	10	Final
Northern Ontario (Lilly) 🔨	1	0	2	3	0	2	3	0	X	X	11
Northwest Territories (Williams)	0	1	0	0	2	0	0	2	X	X	5

Sheet D	1	2	3	4	5	6	7	8	9	10	Final
Saskatchewan (Streifel)	0	3	0	0	0	2	0	0	X	X	5
Prince Edward Island (Fullerton) 🔨	0	0	4	2	1	0	3	2	X	X	12

Sheet F	1	2	3	4	5	6	7	8	9	10	Final
New Brunswick (Armstrong) 🔨	0	0	0	1	1	0	2	3	0	0	7
Yukon (Koltun)	1	0	0	0	0	2	0	0	2	0	5

Sheet G	1	2	3	4	5	6	7	8	9	10	Final
Nova Scotia (Dwyer)	0	2	0	1	0	0	0	2	0	X	5
Manitoba (Birchard) 🔨	0	0	3	0	2	1	2	0	2	X	10

==== Draw 16 ====
Thursday, February 9, 10:00 am

Sheet B	1	2	3	4	5	6	7	8	9	10	Final
Nova Scotia (Dwyer) 🔨	0	0	1	0	1	0	2	0	0	X	4
Prince Edward Island (Fullerton)	1	1	0	1	0	1	0	1	1	X	6

Sheet D	1	2	3	4	5	6	7	8	9	10	Final
Ontario (Sinclair) 🔨	1	0	3	2	0	0	0	1	1	X	8
Northern Ontario (Lilly)	0	2	0	0	3	3	2	0	0	X	10

Sheet E	1	2	3	4	5	6	7	8	9	10	Final
Quebec (Perron) 🔨	0	2	0	1	0	4	0	2	0	0	9
Manitoba (Birchard)	0	0	3	0	1	0	4	0	2	1	11

Sheet G	1	2	3	4	5	6	7	8	9	10	Final
Yukon (Koltun) 🔨	0	0	0	1	0	0	0	2	0	X	3
Northwest Territories (Williams)	0	2	2	0	1	1	1	0	1	X	8

==== Draw 17 ====
Thursday, February 9, 3:30 pm

Sheet A	1	2	3	4	5	6	7	8	9	10	Final
Northern Ontario (Lilly)	0	2	3	2	0	1	1	0	2	X	11
Newfoundland and Labrador (Trickett) 🔨	1	0	0	0	2	0	0	1	0	X	4

Sheet D	1	2	3	4	5	6	7	8	9	10	Final
Alberta (Peterman) 🔨	0	2	0	3	0	2	0	1	1	X	9
Northwest Territories (Williams)	0	0	2	0	1	0	1	0	0	X	4

Sheet F	1	2	3	4	5	6	7	8	9	10	Final
British Columbia (Van Osch)	0	2	0	1	0	2	0	3	0	1	9
Saskatchewan (Streifel) 🔨	1	0	0	0	2	0	1	0	3	0	7

Sheet G	1	2	3	4	5	6	7	8	9	10	Final
Prince Edward Island (Fullerton)	0	0	2	0	2	0	1	1	0	1	7
New Brunswick (Armstrong) 🔨	0	1	0	2	0	1	0	0	1	0	5

==== Draw 18 ====
Thursday, February 9, 7:00 pm

Sheet A	1	2	3	4	5	6	7	8	9	10	Final
Alberta (Peterman)	1	0	1	1	3	0	0	0	1	0	7
Yukon (Koltun) 🔨	0	1	0	0	0	1	2	1	0	1	6

Sheet D	1	2	3	4	5	6	7	8	9	10	Final
British Columbia (Van Osch)	0	0	0	0	0	1	0	0	2	2	5
Manitoba (Birchard) 🔨	0	0	2	1	0	0	2	1	0	0	6

Sheet F	1	2	3	4	5	6	7	8	9	10	Final
Nova Scotia (Dwyer)	0	0	0	1	0	1	0	X	X	X	2
Ontario (Sinclair) 🔨	1	1	1	0	5	0	1	X	X	X	9

Sheet H	1	2	3	4	5	6	7	8	9	10	Final
Quebec (Perron)	0	1	1	0	0	2	0	0	1	0	5
Saskatchewan (Streifel) 🔨	1	0	0	1	1	0	1	1	0	2	7

==== Draw 19 ====
Friday, February 10, 8:00 am

Sheet B	1	2	3	4	5	6	7	8	9	10	11	Final
Alberta (Peterman)	0	1	0	1	0	1	0	1	1	0	3	8
New Brunswick (Armstrong) 🔨	0	0	1	0	2	0	0	0	0	2	0	5

Sheet C	1	2	3	4	5	6	7	8	9	10	Final
Nova Scotia (Dwyer)	1	1	0	2	1	0	1	1	2	0	9
British Columbia (Van Osch) 🔨	0	0	2	0	0	3	0	0	0	0	5

Sheet E	1	2	3	4	5	6	7	8	9	10	Final
Northwest Territories (Williams)	0	0	1	1	0	1	0	2	X	X	5
Saskatchewan (Streifel) 🔨	2	1	0	0	2	0	1	0	X	X	6

Sheet H	1	2	3	4	5	6	7	8	9	10	Final
Ontario (Sinclair)	1	0	2	0	4	0	4	X	X	X	11
Yukon (Koltun) 🔨	0	1	0	2	0	1	0	X	X	X	4

==== Draw 20 ====
Friday, February 10, 1:00 pm

Sheet A	1	2	3	4	5	6	7	8	9	10	Final
Prince Edward Island (Fullerton)	0	0	3	0	0	3	0	0	0	0	6
Quebec (Perron) 🔨	0	1	0	1	2	0	3	1	1	0	9

Sheet C	1	2	3	4	5	6	7	8	9	10	Final
Yukon (Koltun)	0	0	2	0	0	2	0	3	0	0	7
Manitoba (Birchard) 🔨	2	0	0	1	2	0	1	0	1	1	8

Sheet E	1	2	3	4	5	6	7	8	9	10	Final
Northern Ontario (Lilly) 🔨	3	0	1	1	1	0	3	X	X	X	9
New Brunswick (Armstrong)	0	1	0	0	0	1	0	X	X	X	2

Sheet G	1	2	3	4	5	6	7	8	9	10	Final
Newfoundland and Labrador (Trickett) 🔨	0	0	0	0	0	1	0	1	X	X	2
Saskatchewan (Streifel)	0	0	2	2	1	0	2	0	X	X	7

=== Playoffs ===
Semifinal			Final
			1	Manitoba	6
2	Alberta	8	2	Alberta	12
3	British Columbia	7

==== Semifinal ====
Saturday, February 11, 2:00 pm

Sheet C	1	2	3	4	5	6	7	8	9	10	Final
Alberta (Peterman) 🔨	1	0	0	1	0	2	0	0	4	0	8
British Columbia (Van Osch)	0	0	1	0	3	0	0	2	0	1	7

Player percentages
Alberta		British Columbia	
Kristine Anderson	79%	Brooklyn Leitch	74%
Rebecca Konschuh	55%	Marika Van Osch	83%
Brittany Tran	64%	Kalia Van Osch	84%
Jocelyn Peterman	78%	Kesa Van Osch	69%
Total	69%	Total	77%

==== Final ====
Saturday, February 11, 7:00 pm

Sheet C	1	2	3	4	5	6	7	8	9	10	Final
Manitoba (Birchard) 🔨	0	0	1	0	0	2	0	3	0	X	6
Alberta (Peterman)	0	0	0	4	5	0	1	0	2	X	12

Player percentages
Alberta		Manitoba	
Kristine Anderson	88%	Mariah Mondor	82%
Rebecca Konschuh	85%	Kristin MacCuish	72%
Brittany Tran	75%	Shannon Birchard	79%
Jocelyn Peterman	85%	Selena Kaatz	62%
Total	83%	Total	74%

== Awards ==
The all-star teams and award winners are as follows:

=== All-Star teams ===
Women

First Team

- Skip: Selena Kaatz, Manitoba (fourth)
- Third: Kalia Van Osch, British Columbia
- Second: Kristin MacCuish, Manitoba
- Lead: Mariah Mondor, Manitoba

Second Team

- Skip: Kesa Van Osch, British Columbia
- Third: Shannon Birchard, Manitoba
- Second: Marika Van Osch, British Columbia
- Lead: Chantal Allan, Ontario

Men

First Team

- Skip: Brendan Bottcher, Alberta
- Third: Quinn Hersikorn, Saskatchewan
- Second: Landon Bucholz, Alberta
- Lead: Brady Kendel, Saskatchewan

Second Team

- Skip: Kyle Doering, Manitoba
- Third: Kristofer Leupen, Northern Ontario
- Second: Jacob Hersikorn, Saskatchewan
- Lead: Lucas Van Den Bosch, Manitoba

=== Ken Watson Sportsmanship Awards ===
Women

- Jess Cunningham, Newfoundland and Labrador second

Men

- Evan Asmussen, Alberta third

=== Fair Play Awards ===
Women

- Lead: Hillary Thompson, Prince Edward Island
- Second: Jess Cunningham, Newfoundland and Labrador
- Third: Marissa Gale, New Brunswick
- Skip: Emily Dwyer, Nova Scotia
- Coach: Angela Hodgson, Prince Edward Island

Men

- Lead: Brett Spier, Ontario
- Second: Landon Bucholz, Alberta
- Third: Chris MacRae, New Brunswick
- Skip: Daniel Murray, Northwest Territories
- Coach: Calvin Edie, Manitoba

=== ASHAM National Coaching Awards ===
Women

- Angela Hodgson, Prince Edward Island

Men

- Kevin Patterson, Nova Scotia

=== Joan Mead Legacy Awards ===
Women

- Nicole Noseworthy, Newfoundland and Labrador lead

Men

- Félix Asselin, Quebec skip

== Qualification ==
=== Ontario ===
The Pepsi Ontario Junior Curling Championships were held January 4–8 at the Russell Curling Club in Russell.

Results:

Men's	W	L
Brett DeKoning (Omemee)	5	2
Chris Lewis (Napanee)	5	2
Richard Krell (St. Thomas)	4	3
Brett Lyon-Hatcher (Huntley)	4	3
Scott Brandon (Chinguacousy)	4	3
Ben Bevan (Annandale)	2	5
Doug Kee (Sarnia)	2	5
Fraser Reid (Westmount)	2	5

Women's	W	L
Lauren Horton (Almonte)	5	2
Jamie Sinclair (Manotick)	5	2
Caitlin Romain (Guelph)	5	2
Chelsea Brandwood (Grimsby)	4	3
Stephanie Van Huyse (St. Thomas)	3	4
Shannon Kee (Tam Heather)	3	4
Kendall Haymes (Collingwood)	2	5
Kristina Adams (Peterborough)	1	6

Playoffs

- Men's tiebreakers: Brandon 8-5 Lyon-Hatcher; Krell 7-5 Brandon
- Men's semi final: Krell 7-5 Lewis
- Men's final: DeKoning 7-4 Krell
- Women's semi final: Sinclair 8, Romain 6
- Women's final: Sinclair 9, Horton 3
