= Canadian Mixed Doubles Curling Olympic Trials =

The Canadian Mixed Doubles Curling Olympic Trials, known until 2025 as the Canad Inns Canadian Mixed Doubles Trials for sponsorship reasons, occur every four years, in the year preceding the Winter Olympic Games. These trials have been used to determine the Canadian representatives in the year's Winter Olympic Games since mixed doubles curling was added to the Olympic program for the 2018 Winter Olympic games.

For the 2018 and 2022 Mixed Doubles Trials, members of Canada's Olympic four-player teams were are not eligible to compete or be named to both the four-player team and mixed doubles events because of the rigours of the Olympic curling schedule. If a player's teammate qualified for the Olympics as part of a four-player team, the player had to name a replacement to compete alongside them in the Trials. This however changed in 2025, where winners of the Mixed Doubles Trials will have the option of also competing for their four-player teams at the Olympics, should they qualify in both events.

== Champions ==
Trials	Winning Team	Runners Up	Location	Placing at Olympics
2018	(Manitoba) Kaitlyn Lawes / (Alberta) John Morris	(Alberta) Val Sweeting / (Newfoundland and Labrador) Brad Gushue	Portage la Prairie, Manitoba	(gold) Gold
2022	Cancelled due to the COVID-19 pandemic in Canada (Alberta) Rachel Homan and John Morris chosen for Olympics		Portage la Prairie, Manitoba	5th
2025	(Alberta) Jocelyn Peterman / Brett Gallant	(Alberta) Rachel Homan / Brendan Bottcher	Liverpool, Nova Scotia	5th
