= 2010 Alberta Winter Games =

Winter Games Season

- Host city: Bonnyville and Cold Lake, Alberta
- Country: Canada
- Dates: February 4–7, 2010
- Website: Alberta Winter Games

The 2010 Alberta Winter Games were held on February 4–7, 2010 in Bonnyville and Cold Lake, Alberta region to showcase Albertan winter athletes. Over 2,000 athletes, coaches, and officials participated in 24 sports at the event.
