= Softball at the 2013 Canada Summer Games =

Softball at the 2013 Canada Summer Games was held in Sherbrooke, Quebec at Parc Bureau and Parc Desranleau.

The events will be held during the first week between August 3 and 9, 2013.

== Medal table ==
The following is the medal table for cycling at the 2013 Canada Summer Games.

* Host nation (Quebec)

Rank	Nation	Gold	Silver	Bronze	Total
1	British Columbia	1	0	0	1
2	Manitoba	0	1	0	1
3	Quebec*	0	0	1	1
Totals (3 entries)		1	1	1	3

== Medalists ==
Event	Gold	Silver	Bronze
Women's	British Columbia	Manitoba	Quebec

== Results ==
=== Qualification ===
Team	W	L	Pts For	Pts Against
Manitoba	8	1	-	-
Quebec	8	1	-	-
Ontario	8	1	-	-
British Columbia	6	3	-	-
Saskatchewan	5	3	-	-
Alberta	4	5	-	-
Nova Scotia	3	6	-	-
Prince Edward Island	2	7	-	-
New Brunswick	1	8	-	-
Newfoundland and Labrador	0	9	-	-

=== Playoffs ===
Page playoff system
1	Manitoba	6
2	Quebec	5
3	Ontario	0
4	British Columbia	3

Semifinal
2	Quebec	1
4	British Columbia	2

Final
1	Manitoba	1
4	British Columbia	9
