= Shannon Birchard =

Canadian curler (born 1994)

- Curler
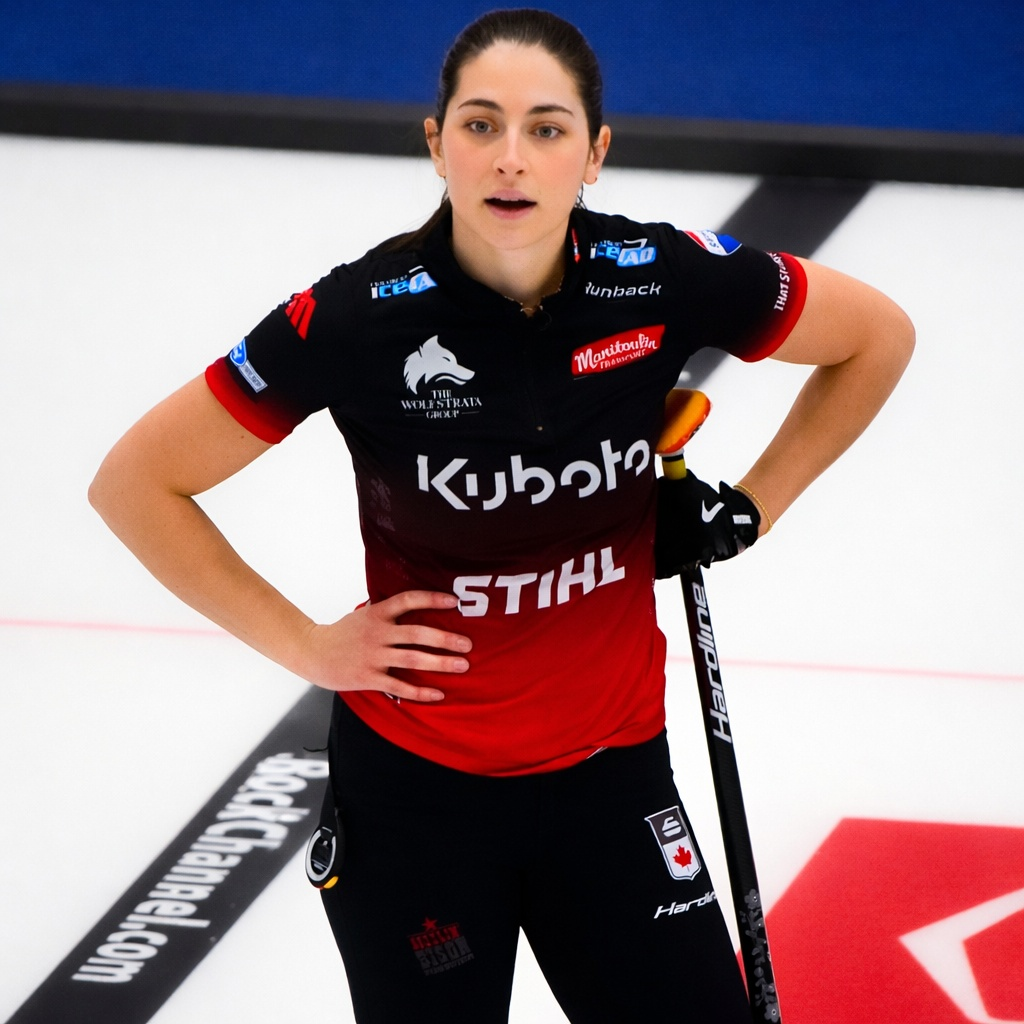
- Birchard at the 2026 Players' Championship
- Born: May 11, 1994 (age 32); Winnipeg, Manitoba

Team
- Curling club: Gimli CC, Gimli, MB; Charleswood CC; Winnipeg, MB
- Skip: Kerri Einarson
- Third: Shannon Birchard
- Second: Karlee Burgess
- Lead: Jocelyn Peterman

Curling career
- Member Association: Manitoba
- Hearts: 7 (2018, 2020, 2021, 2022, 2023, 2024, 2026)
- World Championship: 5 (2018, 2021, 2022, 2023, 2026)
- Pan Continental Championship: 2 (2022, 2023)
- Top CTRS ranking: 1st (2019–20, 2022–23)
- Grand Slam victories: 5 (2019 Players', 2021 Players', 2022 Champions Cup, 2022 Masters, 2026 Invitational)
Medal record
Women's curling
Representing Canada
World Championships
Gold medal – first place	2018 North Bay
Silver medal – second place	2026 Calgary
Bronze medal – third place	2022 Prince George
Bronze medal – third place	2023 Sandviken
Pan Continental Championships
Bronze medal – third place	2022 Calgary
Scotties Tournament of Hearts
Gold medal – first place	2021 Calgary
Gold medal – first place	2022 Thunder Bay
Gold medal – first place	2023 Kamloops
Gold medal – first place	2026 Mississauga
Representing Manitoba
Canadian Olympic Curling Trials
Bronze medal – third place	2025 Halifax
Scotties Tournament of Hearts
Gold medal – first place	2018 Penticton
Gold medal – first place	2020 Moose Jaw

Shannon Birchard (born May 11, 1994) is a Canadian curler from Winnipeg, Manitoba. She currently plays third on Team Kerri Einarson from Gimli, Manitoba. The Einarson team are five-time Scotties Tournament of Hearts champions, winning the title in 2020, 2021, 2022, 2023 and 2026. Birchard also won the 2018 Scotties Tournament of Hearts with Jennifer Jones when she filled for Kaitlyn Lawes who was competing at the PyeongChang Olympics. She won a world championship as the alternate member of the Jones team that same year when they won the event in North Bay in 2018. She has also won five Grand Slam of Curling events with the Einarson rink.

== Career ==
=== Juniors ===
Birchard won two provincial junior championships in her junior career, in 2012 and 2013 as a skip. At the 2012 Canadian Junior Curling Championships, Birchard led her team of Selena Kaatz, Kristin MacCuish and Mariah Mondor to a 10-2 round robin record, giving her rink a bye to the finals, where she lost to Alberta's Jocelyn Peterman. At the 2013 Canadian Junior Curling Championships, she led her team of Nicole Sigvaldason, Sheyna Andries and Mondor to a 9–1 record before the playoffs. There, she won the semifinal game against Ontario's Jamie Sinclair before losing in the final to Corryn Brown's British Columbia rink. She was not able to defend her Manitoba title in 2014 or in 2015, when she lost in the final.

=== Women's ===
After failing to win a third provincial junior title, Birchard played in her first women's provincial championship (the Manitoba Scotties) in 2014 with Nicole Sigvaldason, Kelsey Boettcher and Megan Sigvaldason. The team finished the tournament with a 1–6 record.

Birchard returned to the Manitoba Scotties in 2016 with her 2013 junior team. There, she found more success, making the playoffs after posting a 6–1 record. In the playoffs she beat Cathy Overton-Clapham, but then lost in the semifinal to Kerri Einarson.

Her team played in the 2017 Manitoba Scotties Tournament of Hearts, again making the playoffs after winning a tiebreaker game after a 4–3 record. However, she lost to Darcy Robertson in their only playoff game. Birchard won the Manitoba Mixed doubles title that year and played in the 2017 Canadian Mixed Doubles Curling Championship with partner Jason Gunnlaugson. They went 5–2 after group play, but were eliminated in the round of 12 against Marliese Kasner and Dustin Kalthoff.

Birchard and her team began the 2017–18 season by winning the 2017 Colonial Square Ladies Classic, after beating defending Olympic champion Jennifer Jones in the final. She played vice for Jones on Team Manitoba at the 2018 Scotties Tournament of Hearts, with Jones' regular vice Kaitlyn Lawes absent in preparation for the mixed doubles tournament of the 2018 Winter Olympics. They went on to win the Scotties after defeating fellow Manitoban, Kerri Einarson in the final. After the win Birchard said that "It's pretty unbelievable. I don't even have words right now, I'm speechless. I'm so overjoyed and so happy that they chose me to come along. This has been a dream of mine for a really long time." With Lawes returning to the team following the Olympics, Birchard became the alternate for Team Canada at the 2018 World Women's Curling Championship. In their matches against the Czech and Italian teams, Birchard had a chance to play in the second half, replacing Lawes and Jill Officer in each of their games well under control. She had a chance to play a full game, replacing Officer in their match against Japan. The team went undefeated through the whole tournament, winning the extra-end final against the reigning Olympic champions, Team Hasselborg of Sweden.

For the 2018–19 season, Birchard joined a new team with Kerri Einarson, Val Sweeting, and Briane Meilleur, all former skips. They began the season by winning three straight World Curling Tour events in three weeks: the 2018 Stu Sells Oakville Tankard, the inaugural Morris SunSpiel and then the Mother Club Fall Curling Classic with a fourth win at the Curlers Corner Autumn Gold Classic in October. In December, the team lost in the finals of the 2018 Canada Cup and 2018 National. Their strong play during the early part of the season earned them enough points to put team Einarson in the Wild Card game at the 2019 Scotties Tournament of Hearts. However the team lost to the lower ranked Casey Scheidegger rink. The team rebounded to have a strong finish at the end of the season, winning the 2019 Players' Championship and losing in the final of the 2019 Champions Cup.

Team Einarson had two playoff finishes at the first two Slams of the 2019–20 season, losing to Anna Hasselborg in the quarterfinal of the Masters and once again to Hasselborg in the final of the Tour Challenge. The team did not have the same success at the Canada Cup as they did in 2018, finishing with a 2–4 record. However, at the 2020 Manitoba Scotties Tournament of Hearts, her team succeeded. They finished the round robin and championship round with a 7–1 record which qualified them for the final. In the final, they defeated Jennifer Jones. It was Birchard's first Manitoba Scotties Tournament of Hearts provincial title. Team Einarson represented Manitoba at the 2020 Scotties Tournament of Hearts, where they continued their success. They finished first in the round robin with a 9–2 record and then won the 1 vs. 2 page playoff game, qualifying them for the final. Birchard won her second Canadian Championship when they defeated Rachel Homan 8–7 in an extra end. Birchard was named the All-Star Second for the tournament. The team was set to represent Canada at the 2020 World Women's Curling Championship before the event got cancelled due to the COVID-19 pandemic. The Scotties was their last event of the season as both the Players' Championship and the Champions Cup Grand Slam events were also cancelled due to the pandemic.

Team Einarson returned to the Scotties Tournament of Hearts in 2021 as Team Canada. They went 7–1 in the round robin, with their only loss coming against Ontario's Rachel Homan. This qualified them for the championship round. There, they won three games and lost one to Manitoba's Jennifer Jones. They advanced to the playoffs as the second seed, defeating Alberta's Laura Walker 9–3 in the semifinal. In the final, they defeated Homan to win their second consecutive Scotties gold. Birchard was named the First Team All-Star second for the second year in a row. A month later, Birchard was back in the Calgary bubble to compete with her mixed doubles partner Catlin Schneider at the 2021 Canadian Mixed Doubles Curling Championship. The pair qualified for the playoffs with a 4–2 record and defeated Emma Miskew and Ryan Fry in the round of 12. They then lost to Danielle Schmiemann and John Morris in the round of 8, eliminating them from contention. Birchard returned to the bubble for a third time in April 2021, along with her women's team to play in the two only Grand Slam events of the abbreviated season. The team made it to the semifinals of the 2021 Champions Cup where they lost to Team Homan, but got their revenge at the 2021 Players' Championship a week later, where they beat Homan in the final. The following week, Team Einarson represented Canada at the 2021 World Women's Curling Championship. The team had a slow start to the event, falling to 1–5 after their first six games. They turned things around, however, winning six of their seven remaining round robin games to qualifying for the playoffs. They then faced Sweden's Anna Hasselborg in the qualification game, which they lost 8–3.

The Einarson rink had a slow start to the 2021–22 season, failing to win any of their first five tour events. Their best finish came at the 2021 Sherwood Park Women's Curling Classic where they lost in the final to Tracy Fleury. The team reached the quarterfinals of the 2021 Masters, however, then missed the playoffs at the 2021 National. At the 2021 Canadian Olympic Curling Trials, the team went through the round robin with a 4–4 record. This earned them a spot in the first tiebreaker, where they defeated Casey Scheidegger 8–6. They then faced Krista McCarville in the second tiebreaker, where they lost 4–3 and were eliminated. The team's next event was the 2022 Scotties Tournament of Hearts in Thunder Bay, Ontario. Through the round robin, the defending Scotties champions posted a perfect 8–0 record, earning a spot in the playoffs. They then lost in the seeding round to New Brunswick's Andrea Crawford, meaning they would have to win three straight games to defend their championship title. In the playoffs, the team won the 3 vs. 4 page playoff against Team Fleury and then defeated New Brunswick's Crawford in the semifinal to reach the Scotties final where they faced Northern Ontario's McCarville rink. After controlling the entire game, Team Einarson sealed the victory with a steal of one in the tenth end. With the win, they became just the fourth team to win three consecutive Scotties titles. They then went on to represent Canada at the 2022 World Women's Curling Championship, where they fared much better than in 2021. The team finished the round robin tied for second place with a 9–3 record, however, due to their draw shot challenge, finished third overall. This placed them in the qualification game where they defeated Denmark's Madeleine Dupont to advance to the semifinal. There, they took on South Korea's Kim Eun-jung. After taking control in the seventh end, South Korea stole the ninth and tenth ends to hand the Canadian team a 9–6 loss. They were able to rebound in the bronze medal game with an 8–7 victory over Sweden's Anna Hasselborg. Team Einarson wrapped up their season at the final two Slams of the season. At the 2022 Players' Championship, they made it all the way to the final where they were defeated by the Hasselborg rink. At the 2022 Champions Cup, the team secured their third Grand Slam title as a foursome with a 10–6 victory over Gim Eun-ji.

The 2022–23 season began for Team Einarson at the 2022 PointsBet Invitational single elimination event where they entered as the top seeded team. After defeating Tracey Larocque and Kelsey Rocque, they lost 9–5 to the new Jennifer Jones rink in the semifinal. The team next played in the first Slam of the year, the 2022 National, where they lost 7–3 to Silvana Tirinzoni in the event final. They also reached the final of the 2022 Tour Challenge where they lost 8–4 to Rachel Homan. Team Einarson was chosen to represent Canada at the 2022 Pan Continental Curling Championships where they qualified for the playoffs as the second seeds with a 7–1 record. They then lost 6–5 to Japan in the semifinal but rebounded to beat the United States in the bronze medal game. The team won their fourth Grand Slam together by going undefeated to claim the 2022 Masters. In December, they travelled to Japan to compete in the 2022 Karuizawa International Curling Championships where they lost in the final to Kim Eun-jung. In the new year, Team Einarson made it to another Slam final where they lost 5–3 to Satsuki Fujisawa. Returning to the 2023 Scotties Tournament of Hearts as Team Canada, the team again went undefeated through the round robin but lost in the page seeding game to Manitoba's Jones. They then won both the 3 vs. 4 game and the semifinal over Nova Scotia and Northern Ontario respectively to reach another national final where they again faced Jones. After trading singles, Team Canada stole two in the fifth end to open a two-point lead. They secured their record tying fourth Scotties title with a score of five in the ninth end. The team then advanced to the 2023 World Women's Curling Championship where they reached the playoffs again with a 7–5 record. After defeating Japan in the qualification game, they lost in the semifinals for a second year in a row, 8–5 to Norway. They won another bronze medal after an 8–5 win over Sweden. Team Einarson reached the semifinals of the 2023 Players' Championship where they fell 10–3 to Isabella Wranå. They finished their season at the 2023 Champions Cup where they lost 6–5 to Team Homan in the championship game.

Team Einarson reached the quarterfinals in their first event of the 2023–24 season, falling to Serena Gray-Withers at the 2023 Saville Shootout. The team then played in the 2023 PointsBet Invitational where they lost in the final to Team Homan. For the second year in a row, they were chosen to represent Canada at the 2023 Pan Continental Curling Championships. The team did not have a great week, however, losing both the semifinal and bronze medal game to finish fourth. In Grand Slam play, Team Einarson failed to reach any finals for the first time since forming. They had three semifinal finishes and one quarterfinal appearance before missing the playoffs at the 2024 Players' Championship, breaking their streak of qualifying at the previous twelve Slams. A few hours prior to the first draw of the 2024 Scotties Tournament of Hearts, Curling Canada announced that the team's lead Briane Harris was deemed "ineligible" to play in the tournament without going into any more detail. She was replaced by alternate Krysten Karwacki. Despite the disturbance, Team Einarson managed a 7–1 record through the round robin to qualify for the championship round. Once there, however, they lost both their games to Team Homan and Manitoba's Kate Cameron, eliminating them from contention and ending their chance of a record setting fifth straight Scotties title. Following the event, in March, it was revealed that Harris had been provisionally suspended for up to four years for testing positive for Ligandrol, a banned substance. She will be appealing the decision to the Court of Arbitration for Sport. Harris was also replaced by Karwacki for the Players' Championship at the end of the season.

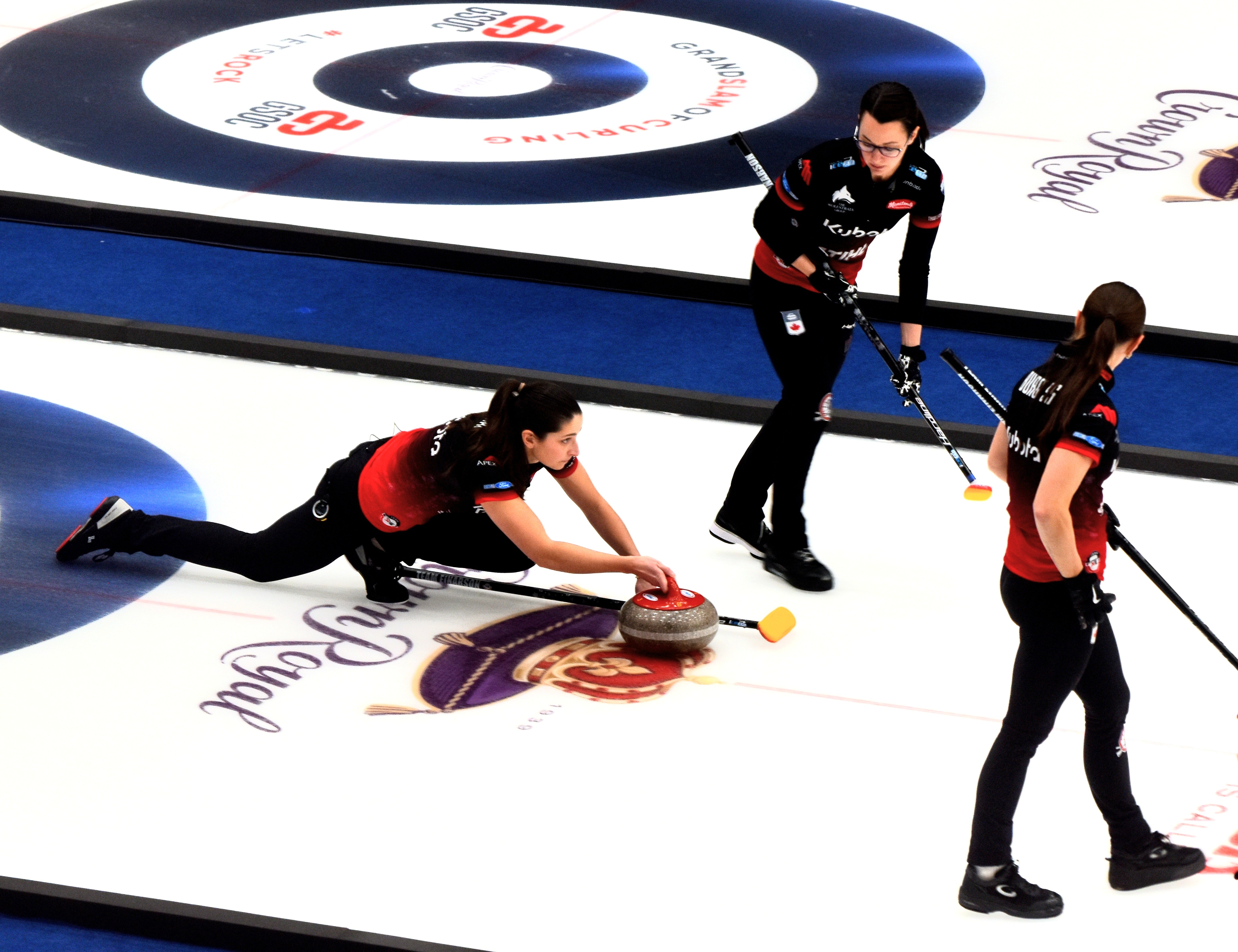
Birchard delivers a rock with her signature tuck slide at 2026 Players' Championship.

She was injured for most of the 2024-2025 season and replaced by Karlee Burgess. At the end of the season, after Birchard recovered from her injury, Einarson announced for the 2025-26 curling season that Birchard would remain as second, with Burgess throwing lead stones, and Karwacki being the alternate. In their first event of the season, Team Einarson won the 2025 Saville Shootout, beating Gim Eun-ji in the final. The team would fail to make the finals of the 2025 Canadian Olympic Curling Trials but the opportunity opened for them to go to the 2026 Scotties Tournament of Hearts as Team Canada. They would go on to win an all-Manitoba final, defeating Lawes' rink. Birchard helped Canada to a strong 3-0 start at the 2026 World Women's Curling Championship, curling 100 per cent in a 9-3 victory over China. They would go on to finish the round robin with a 10–2 record, qualifying for the semifinals where they would beat Japan, but lose to Switzerland's Xenia Schwaller 7–5 in the final, finishing with a silver medal. At the end of the season, Team Einarson announced that they had "parted ways" with third Sweeting, alternate Karwacki, and coach Reid Carruthers. They would later add two-time Olympian Jocelyn Peterman to the lineup as lead, with Burgess now as second and Birchard as third.

== Personal life ==
Birchard attended the University of Winnipeg. She is a self-employed bookkeeper. Birchard is married and has one daughter.

== Grand Slam record ==
Key
C	Champion
F	Lost in Final
SF	Lost in Semifinal
QF	Lost in Quarterfinals
R16	Lost in the round of 16
Q	Did not advance to playoffs
T2	Played in Tier 2 event
DNP	Did not participate in event
N/A	Not a Grand Slam event that season

Event	2017–18	2018–19	2019–20	2020–21	2021–22	2022–23	2023–24	2024–25	2025–26	2026–27
Invitational	DNP	SF	F	N/A	N/A	F	SF	DNP	QF	C
Masters	DNP	Q	QF	N/A	QF	C	SF	DNP	Q	Q
National	DNP	F	Q	N/A	Q	F	QF	DNP	Q	QF
Open	SF (Note: Birchard joined Team Jennifer Jones as their alternate, switching positions with third Kaitlyn Lawes.)	Q	QF	N/A	N/A	F	SF	DNP	QF	
Players'	DNP	C	N/A	C	F	SF	Q	DNP	F	
Champions Cup	DNP	F	N/A	SF	C	F	N/A	N/A	N/A	N/A

== Teams ==
Season	Skip	Third	Second	Lead
2010–11	Shannon Birchard	Heather Maxted	Kelsey Resler	Meagan Grenkow
2011–12	Shannon Birchard	Selena Kaatz	Kristin MacCuish	Mariah Mondor
2012–13	Shannon Birchard	Nicole Sigvaldason	Sheyna Andries	Mariah Mondor
2013–14	Shannon Birchard	Jenna Boisvert	Taylor Maida	Katrina Thiessen
2014–15	Shannon Birchard	Jenna Boisvert	Taylor Maida	Katrina Thiessen
2015–16	Shannon Birchard	Nicole Sigvaldason	Sheyna Andries	Mariah Mondor
2016–17	Shannon Birchard	Nicole Sigvaldason	Sheyna Andries	Mariah Mondor
2017–18	Shannon Birchard	Nicole Sigvaldason	Sheyna Andries	Mariah Mondor
2018–19	Kerri Einarson	Val Sweeting	Shannon Birchard	Briane Meilleur
2019–20	Kerri Einarson	Val Sweeting	Shannon Birchard	Briane Meilleur
2020–21	Kerri Einarson	Val Sweeting	Shannon Birchard	Briane Meilleur
2021–22	Kerri Einarson	Val Sweeting	Shannon Birchard	Briane Meilleur
2022–23	Kerri Einarson	Val Sweeting	Shannon Birchard	Briane Harris
2023–24	Kerri Einarson	Val Sweeting	Shannon Birchard	Briane Harris
2024–25	Kerri Einarson	Val Sweeting	Shannon Birchard (Note: replaced by Karlee Burgess mid-season due to injury.)	Krysten Karwacki
2025–26	Kerri Einarson	Val Sweeting	Shannon Birchard	Karlee Burgess
2026–27	Kerri Einarson	Shannon Birchard	Karlee Burgess	Jocelyn Peterman
