= 2009 SaskTel Tankard =

- Host city: Meadow Lake, Saskatchewan
- Arena: Meadow Lake Curling Club
- Dates: February 4–8
- Winner: Joel Jordison
- Curling club: Bushell Park CC, Moose Jaw, SK
- Skip: Joel Jordison
- Third: Scott Bitz
- Second: Aaron Schmidt
- Lead: Dean Hicke
- Finalist: Pat Simmons

The 2009 SaskTel Tankard (Saskatchewan's men's provincial curling championship) was held February 4 to 8 at the Meadow Lake Curling Club in Meadow Lake, Saskatchewan. The tournament concluded with Joel Jordison's team claiming victory, and they represented Saskatchewan at the 2009 Tim Hortons Brier in Calgary.

== Teams ==
Skip	Vice	Second	Lead	Club
Jason Ackerman	Andrew Foreman	Curtis Horwath	Ryan Sveinbjornson	Tartan Curling Club, Regina
Randy Bryden	Troy Robinson	Russ Bryden	Kerry Gudereit	Caledonian Curling Club, Regina
Glen Despins	Bryan Derbowka	Chris Haichert	Brock Montgomery	Yorkton Curling Club, Yorkton
Brent Gedak	Bob Doerr	Aaron Schell	Ken Wallewein	Estevan Curling Club, Estevan
Doug Harcourt	Gerald Shymko	Dean Klippenstine	Russel Kemper	Humboldt Curling Club, Humboldt
Warren Hassall	Scott Manners	Mike Jantzen	Chris Hassall	Turtleford Curling Club, Turtleford
Brad Heidt	Mitch Heidt	Brennen Jones	Dustin Kidby	Kerrobert Curling Club, Kerrobert
Mark Herbert	Robert Auckland	Kevin Braun	Bruce Schreiner	Bushell Park Curling Club, Moose Jaw
Brian Humble	Dean Kleiter	Terry Hersikorn	Kerry Tarasoff	Sutherland Curling Club, Saskatoon
Joel Jordison	Scott Bitz	Aaron Schmidt	Dean Hicke	Bushell Park Curling Club, Moose Jaw
Brad Law	Randy Semenchuck	Glen Hill	Chris Semenchuck	Tartan Curling Club, Regina
Corey Martens	Ted LaMotte	Les McDougal	Sean McAlupine	Rosthern Curling Club, Rosthern
Darrell McKee	Jason Jacobson	Tony Korol	Mark Lane	Nutana Curling Club, Saskatoon
Dean Moulding	Andrew Edgar	Scott Comfort	Darwin Williamson	Callie Curling Club, Regina
Al Schick	William Coutts	Stuart Coutts	Nathan Grudnizki	Highland Curling Club, Regina
Pat Simmons	Jeff Sharp	Gerry Adam	Steve Laycock	Davidson Curling Club, Davidson

== Draw Brackets ==
=== A Event ===
Round of 16
1	Joel Jordison	8
16	Corey Martens	4
8	Brian Humble	5
9	Warren Hassall	8
12	Dean Moulding	4
5	Al Schick	9
13	Jason Ackerman	6
4	Brad Heidt	8
3	Darrell McKee	7
14	Brent Gedak	9
6	Randy Bryden	6
11	Brad Law	5
7	Doug Harcourt	5
10	Glen Despins	6
15	Mark Herbert	4
2	Pat Simmons	8

Quarterfinals
1	Joel Jordison	8
9	Warren Hassall	7
5	Al Schick	9
4	Brad Heidt	7
14	Brent Gedak	4
6	Randy Bryden	9
10	Glen Despins	6
2	Pat Simmons	7

Semifinals
1	Joel Jordison	9
5	Al Schick	5
6	Randy Bryden	5
2	Pat Simmons	7

A Qualifier
1	Joel Jordison	6
2	Pat Simmons	7

=== B Event ===
Round of 16
Corey Martens	8
Brian Humble	5
Darrell McKee	8
Brad Law	10

Quarterfinals
Corey Martens	8
Brad Heidt	9
Brad Law	6
Glen Despins	4

Semifinals
Brad Heidt	8
Randy Bryden	7
Brad Law	5
Al Schick	9

Finals
Brad Heidt	6
Al Schick	10
B Qualifier Match
Al Schick	4
Joel Jordison	6

Round of 16
Dean Moulding	8
Jason Ackerman	3
Doug Harcourt	7
Mark Herbert	8

Quarterfinals
Dean Moulding	2
Warren Hassall	8
Mark Herbert	8
Brent Gedak	3

Semifinals
Warren Hassall	6
Mark Herbert	7

Finals
Mark Herbert	2
Joel Jordison	9

=== C Event ===
Round of 16
Brian Humble	1
Jason Ackerman	7
Corey Martens	5
Glen Despins	11

Quarterfinals
Jason Ackerman	8
Brad Law	7
Warren Hassall	0
Glen Despins	7

Semifinals
Mark Herbert	6
Jason Ackerman	8
Glen Despins	4
Brad Heidt	9

C Qualifier Match
Jason Ackerman	2
Brad Heidt	5

Round of 16
Darrell McKee	8
Doug Harcourt	5

Quarterfinals
Darrell McKee	10
Randy Bryden	3
Dean Moulding	5
Brent Gedak	7

Semifinals
Darrell McKee	7
Brent Gedak	9

C Qualifier Match
Brent Gedak	8
Al Schick	9

== Results ==
=== Draw 1 ===
February 4, 1500

Sheet 1	1	2	3	4	5	6	7	8	9	10	Final
Corey Martens 🔨	0	1	0	3	0	0	0	0	0	0	4
Joel Jordison	2	0	0	0	0	2	1	0	0	3	8

Sheet 2	1	2	3	4	5	6	7	8	9	10	Final
Warren Hassall 🔨	1	2	0	4	0	0	1	0	X	X	8
Brian Humble	0	0	1	0	2	1	0	1	X	X	5

Sheet 3	1	2	3	4	5	6	7	8	9	10	Final
Dean Moulding 🔨	0	0	0	2	0	2	0	0	X	X	4
Al Schick	0	2	1	0	2	0	2	2	X	X	9

Sheet 4	1	2	3	4	5	6	7	8	9	10	Final
Jason Ackerman	0	1	0	1	1	0	2	0	1	X	6
Brad Heidt 🔨	2	0	3	0	0	2	0	1	0	X	8

=== Draw 2 ===
February 4, 1900

Sheet 1	1	2	3	4	5	6	7	8	9	10	Final
Brent Gedak	1	4	0	0	2	0	0	0	0	2	9
Darrell McKee 🔨	0	0	1	2	0	3	0	1	0	0	7

Sheet 2	1	2	3	4	5	6	7	8	9	10	11	Final
Randy Bryden	2	0	0	0	0	1	0	0	2	0	1	6
Brad Law 🔨	0	0	1	1	0	0	1	0	0	2	0	5

Sheet 3	1	2	3	4	5	6	7	8	9	10	11	Final
Glen Despins 🔨	0	1	2	0	0	0	0	1	1	0	1	6
Doug Harcourt	0	0	0	1	1	1	0	0	0	2	0	5

Sheet 4	1	2	3	4	5	6	7	8	9	10	Final
Pat Simmons 🔨	1	0	0	0	1	0	3	0	3	X	8
Mark Herbert	0	1	0	1	0	1	0	1	0	X	4

=== Draw 3 ===
February 5, 0830

Sheet 1	1	2	3	4	5	6	7	8	9	10	Final
Glen Despins 🔨	0	1	0	1	0	3	0	0	1	0	6
Pat Simmons	0	0	1	0	2	0	1	2	0	1	7

Sheet 2	1	2	3	4	5	6	7	8	9	10	Final
Al Schick	0	1	0	2	3	0	0	3	0	X	9
Brad Heidt 🔨	1	0	2	0	0	2	0	0	2	X	7

Sheet 3	1	2	3	4	5	6	7	8	9	10	Final
Randy Bryden 🔨	2	0	2	1	0	2	0	2	X	X	9
Brent Gedak	0	2	0	0	1	0	1	0	X	X	4

Sheet 4	1	2	3	4	5	6	7	8	9	10	Final
Warren Hassall 🔨	0	0	0	1	0	1	3	0	2	0	7
Joel Jordison	0	1	0	0	3	0	0	3	0	1	8

=== Draw 4 ===
February 5, 1500

Sheet 1	1	2	3	4	5	6	7	8	9	10	Final
Jason Ackerman 🔨	2	0	1	0	0	0	0	X	X	X	3
Dean Moulding	0	2	0	1	0	3	2	X	X	X	8

Sheet 2	1	2	3	4	5	6	7	8	9	10	Final
Doug Harcourt 🔨	0	2	2	0	1	0	1	0	1	0	7
Mark Herbert	1	0	0	2	0	3	0	1	0	1	8

Sheet 3	1	2	3	4	5	6	7	8	9	10	Final
Corey Martens 🔨	1	0	3	0	2	0	1	0	1	X	8
Brian Humble	0	1	0	1	0	1	0	2	0	X	5

Sheet 4	1	2	3	4	5	6	7	8	9	10	Final
Brad Law 🔨	2	0	2	0	2	0	1	0	2	1	10
Darrell McKee	0	2	0	1	0	2	0	3	0	0	8

=== Draw 5 ===
February 5, 1900

Sheet 1	1	2	3	4	5	6	7	8	9	10	Final
Al Schick	0	0	2	0	2	0	0	1	0	X	5
Joel Jordison 🔨	0	1	0	1	0	1	1	0	5	X	9

Sheet 2	1	2	3	4	5	6	7	8	9	10	Final
Pat Simmons 🔨	2	0	0	1	0	2	0	1	0	1	7
Randy Bryden	0	1	0	0	1	0	2	0	1	0	5

Sheet 3	1	2	3	4	5	6	7	8	9	10	Final
Glen Despins	1	0	1	0	1	0	0	1	0	0	4
Brad Law 🔨	0	1	0	1	0	1	1	0	0	2	6

Sheet 4	1	2	3	4	5	6	7	8	9	10	11	Final
Corey Martens	3	0	1	0	1	0	0	3	0	0	0	8
Brad Heidt 🔨	0	2	0	2	0	1	2	0	0	1	1	9

=== Draw 6 ===
February 6, 0830

Sheet 1	1	2	3	4	5	6	7	8	9	10	Final
Brent Gedak	0	1	0	1	0	1	0	0	X	X	3
Mark Herbert 🔨	1	0	2	0	2	0	1	2	X	X	8

Sheet 2	1	2	3	4	5	6	7	8	9	10	Final
Warren Hassall 🔨	2	1	0	2	0	3	X	X	X	X	8
Dean Moulding	0	0	1	0	1	0	X	X	X	X	2

Sheet 3	1	2	3	4	5	6	7	8	9	10	Final
Darrell McKee 🔨	0	2	0	3	0	1	0	1	1	X	8
Doug Harcourt	0	0	2	0	1	0	2	0	0	X	5

Sheet 4	1	2	3	4	5	6	7	8	9	10	Final
Jason Ackerman	2	1	0	0	0	4	X	X	X	X	7
Brian Humble 🔨	0	0	1	0	0	0	X	X	X	X	1

=== Draw 7 ===
February 6, 1200

Sheet 1	1	2	3	4	5	6	7	8	9	10	Final
Randy Bryden	1	0	0	1	0	1	0	2	1	1	7
Brad Heidt 🔨	0	2	1	0	1	0	4	0	0	0	8

Sheet 2	1	2	3	4	5	6	7	8	9	10	Final
Glen Despins 🔨	2	0	1	0	3	0	2	3	X	X	11
Corey Martens	0	3	0	1	0	1	0	0	X	X	5

Sheet 3	1	2	3	4	5	6	7	8	9	10	11	Final
Pat Simmons	0	0	0	2	0	3	0	0	1	0	1	7
Joel Jordison 🔨	0	0	3	0	1	0	0	0	0	2	0	6

Sheet 4	1	2	3	4	5	6	7	8	9	10	Final
Brad Law	0	0	2	0	2	0	0	1	0	X	5
Al Schick 🔨	0	3	0	1	0	1	3	0	1	X	9

=== Draw 8 ===
February 6, 1600

Sheet 2	1	2	3	4	5	6	7	8	9	10	Final
Darrell McKee 🔨	1	0	5	0	4	X	X	X	X	X	10
Randy Bryden	0	1	0	2	0	X	X	X	X	X	3

Sheet 3	1	2	3	4	5	6	7	8	9	10	Final
Warren Hassall	0	0	1	2	0	1	0	0	2	0	6
Mark Herbert 🔨	0	2	0	0	2	0	2	0	0	1	7

Sheet 4	1	2	3	4	5	6	7	8	9	10	Final
Dean Moulding 🔨	0	1	0	1	0	2	1	0	0	0	5
Brent Gedak	1	0	1	0	2	0	0	1	1	1	7

=== Draw 9 ===
February 6, 2000

Sheet 1	1	2	3	4	5	6	7	8	9	10	Final
Mark Herbert 🔨	1	0	0	1	0	0	0	X	X	X	2
Joel Jordison	0	3	0	0	0	3	3	X	X	X	9

Sheet 2	1	2	3	4	5	6	7	8	9	10	11	Final
Jason Ackerman 🔨	1	2	0	2	0	0	0	0	2	0	1	8
Brad Law	0	0	2	0	1	2	1	0	0	1	0	7

Sheet 3	1	2	3	4	5	6	7	8	9	10	Final
Brad Heidt 🔨	1	0	2	0	2	0	0	1	0	0	6
Al Schick	0	2	0	1	0	2	2	0	1	2	10

Sheet 4	1	2	3	4	5	6	7	8	9	10	Final
Warren Hassall	0	0	0	0	0	X	X	X	X	X	0
Glen Despins 🔨	2	3	0	1	1	X	X	X	X	X	7

=== Draw 10 ===
February 7, 0900

Sheet 1	1	2	3	4	5	6	7	8	9	10	Final
Glen Despins	0	0	1	0	1	0	2	0	X	X	4
Brad Heidt 🔨	1	0	0	3	0	2	0	3	X	X	9

Sheet 2	1	2	3	4	5	6	7	8	9	10	Final
Joel Jordison	1	0	1	0	0	1	2	0	0	1	6
Al Schick 🔨	0	0	0	1	0	0	0	2	1	0	4

Sheet 3	1	2	3	4	5	6	7	8	9	10	Final
Darrell McKee	1	0	2	0	1	0	2	0	1	0	7
Brent Gedak 🔨	0	3	0	1	0	1	0	3	0	1	9

Sheet 4	1	2	3	4	5	6	7	8	9	10	Final
Jason Ackerman 🔨	0	3	0	1	0	3	0	0	0	1	8
Mark Herbert	0	0	2	0	1	0	1	1	1	0	6

=== Draw 11 ===
February 7, 1400

Sheet 2	1	2	3	4	5	6	7	8	9	10	Final
Jason Ackerman	0	0	0	1	0	1	0	0	0	X	2
Brad Heidt 🔨	0	0	1	0	1	0	0	1	2	X	5

Sheet 4	1	2	3	4	5	6	7	8	9	10	Final
Brent Gedak	0	1	0	2	0	1	2	0	2	0	8
Al Schick 🔨	2	0	2	0	2	0	0	1	0	2	9

== Playoffs ==
Page playoff system
A	Pat Simmons	8
B	Joel Jordison	6
C1	Brad Heidt	8
C2	Al Schick	7

Semifinal
B	Joel Jordison	7
C1	Brad Heidt	4

Final
A	Pat Simmons	4
B	Joel Jordison	6

=== C1 vs. C2 ===
February 7, 1900

Sheet 2	1	2	3	4	5	6	7	8	9	10	11	Final
Al Schick 🔨	1	0	2	0	0	2	0	0	0	2	0	7
Brad Heidt	0	2	0	1	1	0	2	1	0	0	1	8

=== A vs. B ===
February 7, 1900

Sheet 3	1	2	3	4	5	6	7	8	9	10	Final
Pat Simmons 🔨	2	0	1	1	1	0	2	0	1	X	8
Joel Jordison	0	2	0	0	0	1	0	3	0	X	6

=== Semi-final ===
February 8, 0930

Sheet 3	1	2	3	4	5	6	7	8	9	10	Final
Brad Heidt	1	0	0	0	0	1	0	2	0	X	4
Joel Jordison	0	0	1	2	1	0	2	0	1	X	7

=== Final ===
February 8, 1400

Sheet 3	1	2	3	4	5	6	7	8	9	10	Final
Pat Simmons 🔨	0	0	2	0	0	1	0	0	1	0	4
Joel Jordison	0	1	0	2	0	0	2	0	0	1	6
