= Ben Hebert =

Canadian curler (born 1983)

- Curler
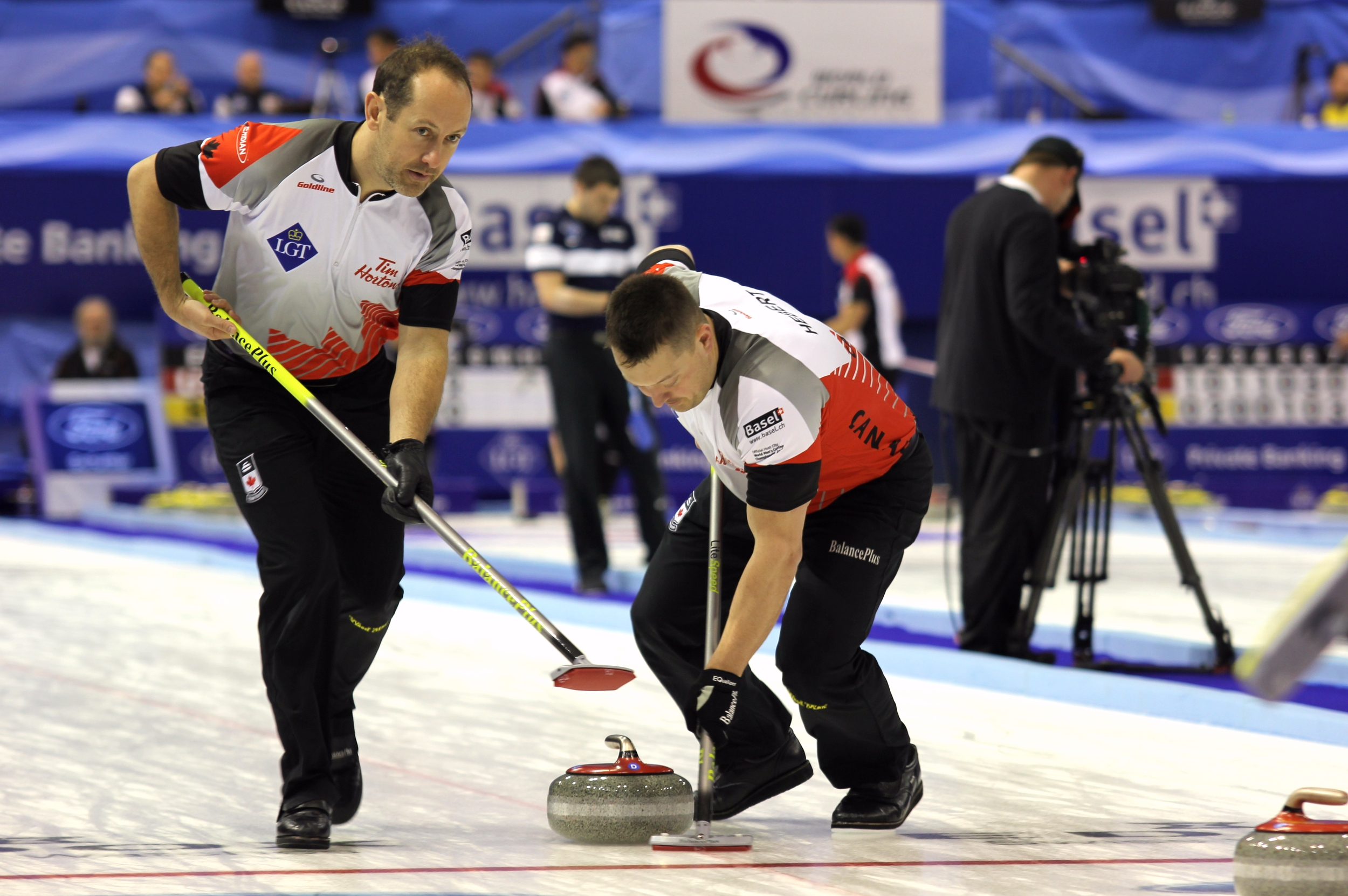
- Brent Laing and Hebert (right) at the 2016 World Men's Curling Championship
- Born: March 16, 1983 (age 43); Regina, Saskatchewan, Canada

Team
- Curling club: The Glencoe Club, Calgary, AB
- Skip: Brad Jacobs
- Third: Marc Kennedy
- Second: Brett Gallant
- Lead: Ben Hebert
- Alternate: Tyler Tardi

Curling career
- Member Association: Saskatchewan (1998–2006); Alberta (2006–present)
- Brier: 18 (2005, 2006, 2007, 2008, 2009, 2011, 2013, 2015, 2016, 2017, 2019, 2020, 2021, 2022, 2023, 2024, 2025, 2026)
- World Championship: 5 (2008, 2009, 2016, 2019, 2025)
- Pan Continental Championship: 1 (2025)
- Olympic: 3 (2010, 2018, 2026)
- Top CTRS ranking: 1st (2006–07, 2007–08, 2009-10, 2010-11, 2015-16, 2024–25, 2025–26)
- Grand Slam victories: 15 (2007 Canadian Open (Jan.), 2007 National (Mar.), 2007 Canadian Open (Dec.), 2007 Players', 2007 National (Dec.), 2010 Canadian Open, 2010 Players', 2010 National (Dec.), 2011 Players', 2014 Players', 2015 Tour Challenge, 2018 Players', 2023 Canadian Open, 2023 Champions Cup, 2026 National)
Medal record
Men's curling
Representing Canada
Olympic Games
Gold medal – first place	2010 Vancouver
Gold medal – first place	2026 Milano Cortina
World Curling Championships
Gold medal – first place	2008 Grand Forks
Gold medal – first place	2016 Basel
Silver medal – second place	2009 Moncton
Silver medal – second place	2019 Lethbridge
Bronze medal – third place	2025 Moose Jaw
Pan Continental Championships
Gold medal – first place	2025 Virginia
World Junior Curling Championships
Gold medal – first place	2003 Flims
The Brier
Silver medal – second place	2017 St. John's
Bronze medal – third place	2026 St. John's
Representing Alberta
Canadian Olympic Curling Trials
Gold medal – first place	2009 Edmonton
Gold medal – first place	2017 Ottawa
Gold medal – first place	2025 Halifax
Bronze medal – third place	2005 Halifax
Bronze medal – third place	2013 Winnipeg
Bronze medal – third place	2021 Saskatoon
The Brier
Gold medal – first place	2008 Winnipeg
Gold medal – first place	2009 Calgary
Gold medal – first place	2016 Ottawa
Gold medal – first place	2019 Brandon
Gold medal – first place	2025 Kelowna
Silver medal – second place	2022 Lethbridge
Bronze medal – third place	2024 Regina
Representing (Alberta) Wild Card
The Brier
Silver medal – second place	2021 Calgary
Bronze medal – third place	2023 London

Benjamin Hebert (born March 16, 1983) is a Canadian curler, 2010 Winter Olympics and 2026 Winter Olympics gold medallist, 2008 and 2016 World Champion, and Five time Brier Champion from Chestermere, Alberta. He currently plays lead on Team Brad Jacobs.

In 2019, Hebert was named the greatest Canadian male lead in history in a TSN poll of broadcasters, reporters and top curlers.

== Career ==
=== Juniors ===
Hebert, from Regina, Saskatchewan, began curling during his school years. In 1998, he led his high school team to compete in the finals for the city of Regina, ultimately losing to the group from Campbell Collegiate. Hebert was also the 5th player on Team Canada, skipped by Steve Laycock, which won the 2003 World Junior Curling Championships.

=== Mens ===
==== Team Simmons (2003–2006) ====
Hebert started his men's career in his home province of Saskatchewan, where he played lead for Pat Simmons. They would notably win 2 SaskTel Tankard titles and represented Saskatchewan in two Briers (2005 & 2006). The team finished 6–5 and 5–6 respectively.

==== Team Martin (2006–2014) ====
Hebert moved to Alberta, and joined up briefly with the John Morris team. He then went with Morris later on in the year to play for Kevin Martin. With his new team, he won the Canada Cup in 2007 and finished fourth place at the 2007 Tim Hortons Brier. In 2008, Hebert was a part of the Alberta team that won the 2008 Tim Hortons Brier, and a member of Team Canada that won the 2008 World Men's Curling Championship. In 2009, Hebert was again the Lead for Team Alberta that repeated as 2009 Tim Hortons Brier Champions as they went 13-0 for the second consecutive Brier, and in the process set a new Brier record with most consecutive wins at 26.

Scandal broke out in their final round robin game at the 2009 Canadian Olympic Curling Trials against the Glenn Howard rink. Howard's third, Richard Hart, accused Hebert of an illegal brushing move in the 9th end. Replays show Hebert illegally lifting his broom off the ice in a vertical direction, instead of lifting it off to the side. This tactic is sometimes made to slow down a rock by dropping debris in front of the rock. Indeed, the rock he was sweeping was heavy, and Hebert's tactic may have caused the rock to veer off course slightly. Whether or not the act was intentional was left undiscovered. Hebert and the rest of Team Martin went on to defeat Glenn Howard in the Final of the 2009 Canadian Olympic Curling Trials. Team Martin went on to represent Canada at the 2010 Winter Olympic Games in Vancouver, winning the gold medal after their 6-3 defeat of Thomas Ulsrud in the finals. Team Martin then capped an amazing 2009/2010 season by winning The Players Championship with an 8-7 extra end victory over Brad Gushue. Martin's team finished 2010 at the top of the WCT Money List with $139,750 and at the top of the WCT Order of Merit. Martin and co. capped the season with a 32-game winning streak.

Hebert and Team Martin won The National in December 2010. In January 2011, Team Martin won the TSN Skins Game defeating Scotland's David Murdoch in the Final and earning $57,000 in the process. They later defeated Kevin Koe in the Alberta Provincial Final and went on to finish 4th at the 2011 Tim Horton's Brier where Hebert was named a First Team All Star at Lead. They capped the season with a win at the Players Championship. With the win, Hebert and his team won the $25,000 first-place prize, plus took home a $50,000 bonus for winning the season-long Capital One Cup points race. The rink finished the season with $125,500 in prize money, second only to Winnipeg's Mike McEwen, who collected $127,490.

The Martin rink's first event of the 2011–12 World Curling Tour was the Point Optical Curling Classic, where they finished as a runner-up to Mike McEwen. The rink rebounded and won their first event of the season, the Westcoast Curling Classic, against McEwen. At the World Cup of Curling, the Martin rink finished the round robin with a 4–1 win–loss record, but missed a chance to win another Grand Slam title after he was edged past by John Epping, 3–4. He failed to make it into the playoffs at his next event, the Sun Life Classic. He and his team then competed in the Canada Cup of Curling, securing close wins over Glenn Howard and Jeff Stoughton in the round robin and finishing the round robin undefeated. He then played Howard in the final, and managed to defeat him with a score of 7–4. He and his team also earned berths into the 2012 Canada Cup, Continental Cup, and, most importantly, the 2013 Olympic Trials.

The Martin rink began their 2012–13 season at the Canada Cup of Curling, where they disappointingly finished the event with a 1–5 record, out of the playoffs. They then participated in the 2013 Continental Cup, where he assisted in leading Team North America to a fifth win over Team World. The team then competed in the Alberta provincials, where he clinched the first seed in the playoffs after edging provincial rival Kevin Koe. He defeated Aaron Sluchinski in the page playoff, and edged Koe in an extra end in the final to claim another provincial title. At the 2013 Brier, Martin and team began the round-robin with one win and four losses, including losses to Jeff Stoughton, Jean-Michel Ménard, and eventual champion Brad Jacobs, before winning their final six matches. Despite a 7–4 win–loss record, they did not qualify for the playoffs, placing fifth and becoming the first Alberta team since Kevin Martin's squad in 2000 to miss the playoffs. At the Players' Championship, Martin and team finished with a 2–2 win–loss record, and they advanced to a tiebreaker, where they lost to John Epping. A few days after the conclusion of the Players' Championship, Martin's longtime third, John Morris, announced that he and Martin were parting ways.

A few weeks after Morris announced his departure from the team, Martin announced that David Nedohin, the fourth player on his former provincial rival Randy Ferbey's team, would join Martin's team. Martin and team won their first event of the season at the Shoot-Out. They made the semifinals in their next event at the Point Optical Curling Classic, but Martin injured his back during the semifinal game. Jeff Sharp subbed in at lead, and Martin's team finished the event as runners-up to Jeff Stoughton. After winning the final of the Direct Horizontal Drilling Fall Classic over Brock Virtue and posting a semifinals finish at the Cactus Pheasant Classic, Martin played in the Masters Grand Slam, finishing the round robin with a 3–1 win–loss record. He proceeded to win his games over Kevin Koe and Liu Rui before reaching the final, where he played a close game with Glenn Howard until Howard pulled away with the win.

Martin attempted to qualify for his fourth Olympics appearance through the 2013 Canadian Olympic Curling Trials. In the round robin, he and his team played consistently and posted a 6–1 win–loss record, with their only loss coming to eventual champion Brad Jacobs. Their record qualified for the semifinal, where they lost a close game to John Morris's team.

After starting off the Canadian Open of Curling with a 4–1 win–loss record, Martin dropped his quarterfinals game against Brad Gushue in the final end of the game. Martin also posted a strong start at the next Grand Slam, The National, but lost to Glenn Howard in the quarterfinals. On April 18, 2014 Martin announced his retirement from curling following the conclusion of the 2014 Players' Championship. At their last tournament together, Martin posted a 3–2 win–loss record in the round robin, and advanced to the playoffs. He edged John Epping and Mike McEwen en route to the final, where he recorded a 4–3 win over Brad Jacobs. At the end of the season, Marc Kennedy and Hebert announced that they would be joining provincial rival Kevin Koe in the next season.

==== Team Koe (2014–2022) ====
Hebert joined Koe as lead alongside Kennedy at third, and second Brent Laing from Ontario who had left the Glenn Howard rink. With his new team, Koe successfully repeated as Albertan champion in the 2015 Boston Pizza Cup, which qualified them to represent Alberta at the 2015 Tim Hortons Brier. There, they finished with a 6–5 record, missing the playoffs. On the tour, his new team won the Direct Horizontal Drilling Fall Classic and the Karuizawa International Curling Championship.

The Koe rink found more success in the 2015–16 season. The team began the season by winning the inaugural GSOC Tour Challenge Grand Slam event. They would also win the 2015 Canada Cup of Curling and would go on to win the 2016 Boston Pizza Cup, sending their team to that year's Brier. After going 8–3 at the 2016 Tim Hortons Brier, Koe and his foursome railed off three straight victories in the playoffs (again having to come out of the 3 vs. 4 game), defeating Newfoundland and Labrador's Brad Gushue in the final. The team would represent Canada at the 2016 World Men's Curling Championship, losing just one game en route to winning the gold medal. Koe led Canada to a 5–3 win over Denmark, skipped by Rasmus Stjerne, in the final. On the tour, the team won the Direct Horizontal Drilling Fall Classic again and the Mercure Perth Masters. They would finish the season in first place on the World Curling Tour Order of Merit rankings and in the CTRS standings. Koe's win at the 2016 Brier qualified the team to represent Team Canada at the 2017 Tim Hortons Brier. Koe again led his team to an 8–3 round robin record, and again had to fight through the 3 vs. 4 game and the semifinals in the playoffs to make it to the final, where he faced Brad Gushue in a re-match of the 2016 Brier. However, Gushue and his Newfoundland rink would win the re-match in front of a partisan home crowd. Earlier in the year, Koe would win the 2017 Pinty's All-Star Curling Skins Game, winning $71,000 for his team. On the tour, the team would win the AMJ Campbell Shorty Jenkins Classic and the Red Deer Curling Classic.

Later in the year, Team Koe played in the 2017 Canadian Olympic Curling Trials, leading his team to a 7–1 round robin record, which put him in the final against Mike McEwen. Koe would get the better of McEwen, qualifying his rink to represent Canada at the 2018 Winter Olympics. At the Olympics, the team started off strong, winning their first four matches. However, in the seminfinal match, Koe's team lost to John Shuster of the United States, the first time a Canadian team had failed to make the finals at the Olympics. The team then lost again in the bronze medal match versus Switzerland, to place fourth overall. Koe was the first skip to fail to medal at the Olympics in Canadian history. The team was devastated by the upset loss, with their head coach John Dunn telling CBC News a year later that "The Olympics will scar all of us who went through that forever."On April 15, 2018, Koe won the Player's Championship Grand Slam of Curling event with a 6–2 victory over Niklas Edin of Sweden. After the season, Kennedy and Laing left the team and were replaced with B. J. Neufeld and Colton Flasch.

Koe and his new team began the 2018–19 season by winning the first leg of the Curling World Cup, defeating Norway's Steffen Walstad in the final. They also reached the final of the Canad Inns Men's Classic, but were beaten by the Bottcher rink. They also lost in the final of the 2018 Canada Cup to the Brad Jacobs rink 5–4. They had previously gone 4–2 in the round robin and won both the tiebreaker and semifinal games. In February, Team Koe finished runner-up to Team Bottcher at the 2019 TSN All-Star Curling Skins Game, earning $36,000 for their second place finish. In provincial playdowns, the Koe rink lost two of their first three games at the 2019 Boston Pizza Cup, before winning five straight games to claim the Alberta provincial title. The team represented Alberta at the 2019 Tim Hortons Brier where they went undefeated throughout the entire tournament. After an 11–0 record through the round robin and championship pools, they beat Northern Ontario's Jacobs rink in the 1 vs. 2 game. They then faced the Bottcher rink in the final where, after a close game all the way through, Koe would execute a double takeout to score two in the tenth end and win the game 4–3 for his team. The win earned the team the right to represent Canada at the 2019 World Men's Curling Championship where they finished the round robin with a 9–3 record. They then won two playoff games to qualify for the final where they lost to Sweden's Niklas Edin rink 7–2, settling for silver. In Grand Slam play, the team failed to win any slams, but did make it to three finals at the 2018 Masters, the 2019 Players' Championship and the 2019 Champions Cup. They also reached the semifinals once and the quarterfinals in the three other events. Despite the lack of any event wins, their strong play was good enough to award them with the Pinty's Cup for the season's best Slam team. The team ended the season at the grand final of the Curling World Cup, where they beat the host Chinese team Zou Qiang in the final to secure another event title. Also during the 2018–19 season, the Koe rink along with five other teams represented North America at the 2019 Continental Cup where they lost by eight points.

Team Koe started their 2019–20 season at the 2019 AMJ Campbell Shorty Jenkins Classic and lost in the quarterfinal to Brad Jacobs. They lost the final of the Stu Sells Toronto Tankard to the Jacobs rink as well. In Grand Slam play, they made the semifinal of the 2019 Tour Challenge and the quarterfinals of the 2019 National. They then, however, missed the playoffs at both the 2019 Masters and the 2020 Canadian Open. At the 2019 Canada Cup, they finished the round robin with a 5–1 record, which qualified them directly for the final which they lost to the John Epping rink. To start 2020, Team Koe once again competed in the 2020 Continental Cup but were this time defeated by Team Europe by fifteen points. At the 2020 Tim Hortons Brier, representing Team Canada, they finished the championship pool with a 7–4 record, which was in a four-way tie for fourth. They faced Jacobs in the first round of tiebreakers where they lost 8–3 and were eliminated. It would be the team's last event of the season as both the Players' Championship and the Champions Cup Grand Slam events were cancelled due to the COVID-19 pandemic. On March 16, 2020, Team Koe announced they would be parting ways with second Colton Flasch. The following day, the team announced they would be adding John Morris to the team as their new second.

Team Koe began the 2020–21 season at the McKee Homes Fall Curling Classic where they lost in the quarterfinals. Their next three events included a semifinal finish at the Ashley HomeStore Curling Classic and two runner-up finishes at both the ATB Banff Classic and the ATB Okotoks Classic. Due to the COVID-19 pandemic in Alberta, the 2021 provincial championship was cancelled. As the reigning provincials champions, Team Brendan Bottcher was chosen to represent Alberta at the 2021 Tim Hortons Brier. However, due to many provinces cancelling their provincial championships due to the COVID-19 pandemic in Canada, Curling Canada added three Wild Card teams to the national championship, which were chosen according to the CTRS standings from the 2019–20 season. Because Team Koe ranked 6th on the CTRS and kept at least three of their four players together for the 2020–21 season, they got the second Wild Card spot at the 2021 Brier in Calgary, Alberta. At the 2021 Tim Hortons Brier, Koe led his rink to a 10–2 round robin record, in first place. This gave them a bye to the final, where they played Team Alberta, skipped by Brendan Bottcher in a re-match of the 2019 Brier final. This time Bottcher won, with Koe and company taking home the silver medal. The team ended their season at the final two Slams of the season, the 2021 Champions Cup and the 2021 Players' Championship, reaching the semifinals of the Champions Cup.

The Koe rink won their first two events of the 2021–22 season, the ATB Okotoks Classic and the IG Wealth Management Western Showdown. At the first two Slams of the season, they reached the quarterfinals of the 2021 Masters and the semifinals of the 2021 National. They then competed in the 2021 Canadian Olympic Curling Trials, held November 20 to 28 in Saskatoon, Saskatchewan. Team Koe qualified for the Trials via their CTRS points as they finished in second place through the 2018–19 season. Through the round robin, Koe led his team of B. J. Neufeld, John Morris and Ben Hebert to a 6–2 record, only suffering losses to the Brad Gushue and Brad Jacobs rinks. This record earned them a place in the semifinal game where they faced the Jacobs' rink. Despite shooting a 96% game, the Koe rink lost the semifinal game 8–3 as Team Jacobs scored two four enders which ended the game early. After the game, Koe said that "It came to a quick thud out there, it sucks." In the new year, the team went undefeated to claim the 2022 Boston Pizza Cup. This earned them the right to represent Alberta at the 2022 Tim Hortons Brier where they finished with a 7–1 round robin record. They then won the seeding game against Saskatchewan's Colton Flasch and beat Team Canada's Brendan Bottcher in the 1 vs. 2 game to qualify directly for the final. There, they faced the Gushue rink. After a tight game all the way through, Team Gushue scored one in the extra end to win the game 9–8 and hand Team Koe their second consecutive Brier silver medal. They ended their season with two more playoff finishes at the 2022 Players' Championship and the 2022 Champions Cup, reaching the final of the latter.

In March 2022, Team Koe announced that they would be disbanding. Hebert would later announce that he would be joining a team skipped by provincial rival Brendan Bottcher as lead, alongside former teammate Kennedy as third, and Brett Gallant as second.

==== Team Bottcher (2022–2024) ====
Bottcher's new look foursome began their first season together by winning the 2022 ATB Okotoks Classic. A week later, they played in the inaugural PointsBet Invitational, making it to the semifinals before losing to Matt Dunstone. A few weeks later, the team played in their first Slam together at the 2022 National. After going 3–1 in pool play, they lost in the quarterfinals to Korey Dropkin. Then, they played in the 2022 Tour Challenge where they lost all of their games. They rebounded at the 2022 Masters winning all four of their pool games, and then made it as far as the semifinals where they lost to Joël Retornaz of Italy in a low scoring 3–1 affair. The team began the 2023 calendar year at the 2023 Canadian Open where they won all of their games to win their first Grand Slam title as a foursome. The following month, they played in the 2023 Boston Pizza Cup provincial championship. There, they won all of their games until the final, where they lost to their provincial rivals Kevin Koe who had inherited Bottcher's former front end of Martin and Thiessen. Due to their performance on the tour that season, they still qualified for the 2023 Tim Hortons Brier as the Wild Card #1 entry. At the Brier, Bottcher led the team to a 7–1 record in pool play. The team then made it into the 3 vs. 4 page playoff game after losing to Manitoba (Matt Dunstone) in the qualification final. In the 3 vs. 4 game, they beat Ontario (Mike McEwen), but then lost in the semifinal when they faced off against Dunstone again, settling for third place. At the final two slams of the year, the team missed the playoffs at the 2023 Players' Championship after going 2–3, but rebounded to go undefeated and win the 2023 Champions Cup. In a change in the qualification format, the Bottcher rink automatically pre-qualified for the 2024 Montana's Brier field based on their 2022–23 Canadian Team Ranking Standings, which meant they bypassed the provincial qualifiers. At the 2024 Brier, the team went 6–2 in their pool, then in the playoffs lost to Gushue in the 1v2 game, and finished 3rd after losing to McEwen in the semifinal. On April 16, 2024, Bottcher's teammates made an announcement that they would be "going in a new direction" at skip, resulting in Bottcher's departure after two seasons. Kennedy, Gallant, and Hebert later announced they would be adding Brad Jacobs as their new skip for the 2024–25 season.

==== Team Jacobs (2024–present) ====
In their first season together, the newly formed Jacobs team enjoyed plenty of success, finishing second at the 2024 National and the 2025 Masters grand slam events. Like the previous season, the Jacobs team pre-qualified for the 2025 Brier based on their CTRS ranking, which meant they bypassed the provincial qualifiers. At the 2025 Montana's Brier, the Jacobs rink would go on to win the national championship, beating Dunstone in the final and qualifying to represent Canada at the 2025 World Men's Curling Championship. At the 2025 World's, the Jacobs rink would go 11–1 in round robin play, but would lose to Scotland's Bruce Mouat in the semi-final. The team would rebound to win the bronze medal, beating China's Xu Xiaoming 11–2 in the bronze medal game.

Team Jacobs would start the 2025–26 curling season winning the 2025 Pan Continental Curling Championships, beating John Shuster of the United States 7–3 in the final. They would also have a strong year on the grand slam tour, finishing as semifinalists at the 2025 Masters and 2025 GSOC Tahoe. Team Jacobs would again try to return to the Olympics at the 2025 Canadian Olympic Curling Trials. There, they would finish the round robin in first place with a 6–1 record, and would then beat Matt Dunstone in both games of their best-of-three final to represent Canada at the 2026 Winter Olympics.

== Personal life ==
Hebert is married and has two children. He is a Business Development Manager with Caltech Surveys Ltd, primarily an oil and gas land surveying company servicing Western Canada (BC, AB, SK, and MB). His cousins DJ and Dustin Kidby are also curlers, as is his uncle Brad Hebert.

== Teams ==
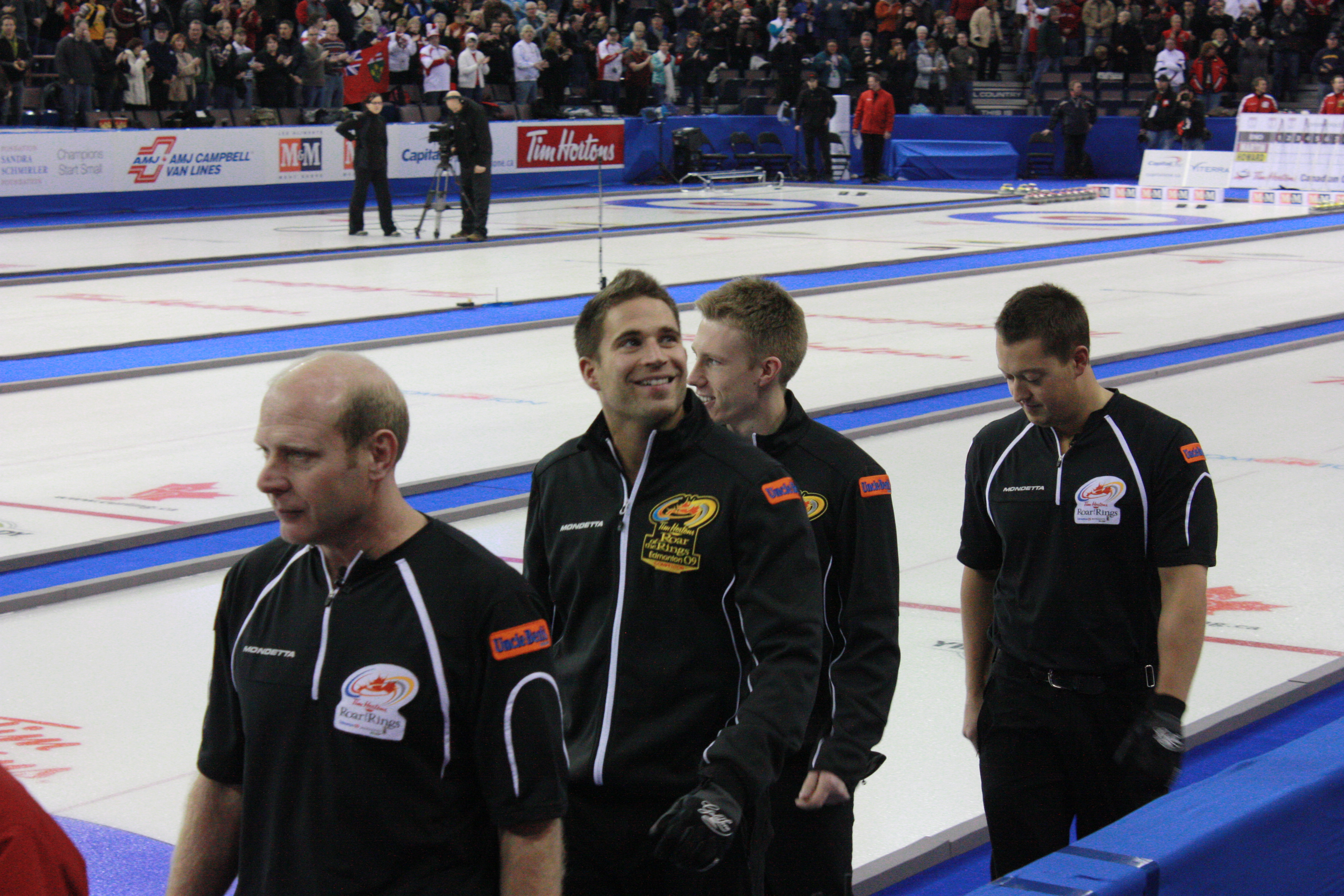
From left: Kevin Martin, John Morris, Marc Kennedy, Hebert

Season	Skip	Third	Second	Lead	Events
1998–99	Kyle George	Ben Hebert	Adan Veare	Dustin Kidby	
1999–00	Kyle George	Ben Hebert	Todd Montgomery	Dustin Kidby	
2000–01	Kyle George	Ben Hebert	Todd Montgomery	Dustin Kidby	
2001–02	Kyle George	Ben Hebert	Todd Montgomery	Dustin Kidby	2002 CJCC
2002–03	Kyle George	Ben Hebert	Todd Montgomery	Dustin Kidby	
2003–04	Pat Simmons	Jeff Sharp	Chris Haichert	Ben Hebert	2004 CC
2004–05	Pat Simmons	Jeff Sharp	Chris Haichert	Ben Hebert	2005 Sask., Brier
2005–06	Pat Simmons	Jeff Sharp	Chris Haichert	Ben Hebert	2006 Sask., Brier
2006–07	Kevin Martin	John Morris	Marc Kennedy	Ben Hebert	2007 Alta., CC, Brier
2007–08	Kevin Martin	John Morris	Marc Kennedy	Ben Hebert	2008 Alta., CC, Brier, WCC
2008–09	Kevin Martin	John Morris	Marc Kennedy	Ben Hebert	2009 Alta., CC, Brier, WCC
2009–10	Kevin Martin	John Morris	Marc Kennedy	Ben Hebert	2009 COCT, 2010 OG
2010–11	Kevin Martin	John Morris	Marc Kennedy	Ben Hebert	2010 CC, 2011 Alta., Brier
2011–12	Kevin Martin	John Morris	Marc Kennedy	Ben Hebert	2011 CC, 2012 Alta.
2012–13	Kevin Martin	John Morris	Marc Kennedy	Ben Hebert	2012 CC, 2013 Alta., Brier
2013–14	Kevin Martin	David Nedohin	Marc Kennedy	Ben Hebert	2013 COCT, 2014 Alta.
2014–15	Kevin Koe	Marc Kennedy	Brent Laing	Ben Hebert	2014 CC, 2015 Alta., Brier
2015–16	Kevin Koe	Marc Kennedy	Brent Laing	Ben Hebert	2015 CC, 2016 Alta., Brier, WCC
2016–17	Kevin Koe	Marc Kennedy	Brent Laing	Ben Hebert	2016 CC, 2017 Brier
2017–18	Kevin Koe	Marc Kennedy	Brent Laing	Ben Hebert	2017 COCT, 2018 OG
2018–19	Kevin Koe	B. J. Neufeld	Colton Flasch	Ben Hebert	2018 CC, 2019 Alta., Brier, WCC
2019–20	Kevin Koe	B. J. Neufeld	Colton Flasch	Ben Hebert	2019 CC, 2020 Brier
2020–21	Kevin Koe	B. J. Neufeld	John Morris	Ben Hebert	2021 Brier
2021–22	Kevin Koe	B. J. Neufeld	John Morris	Ben Hebert	2021 COCT, 2022 Alta., Brier
2022–23	Brendan Bottcher	Marc Kennedy	Brett Gallant	Ben Hebert	2023 Alta., Brier
2023–24	Brendan Bottcher	Marc Kennedy	Brett Gallant	Ben Hebert	2024 Brier
2024–25	Brad Jacobs	Marc Kennedy	Brett Gallant	Ben Hebert	2025 Brier, WCC
2025–26	Brad Jacobs	Marc Kennedy	Brett Gallant	Ben Hebert	2025 COCT, 2026 OG, Brier
2026–27	Brad Jacobs	Marc Kennedy	Brett Gallant	Ben Hebert	
