= 2009 Tim Hortons Brier =

- Host city: Calgary, Alberta
- Arena: Pengrowth Saddledome
- Dates: March 7–15
- Attendance: 246,126
- Winner: Alberta
- Curling club: Saville Sports Centre, Edmonton
- Skip: Kevin Martin
- Third: John Morris
- Second: Marc Kennedy
- Lead: Ben Hebert
- Alternate: Terry Meek
- Coach: Jules Owchar
- Finalist: Manitoba (Jeff Stoughton)

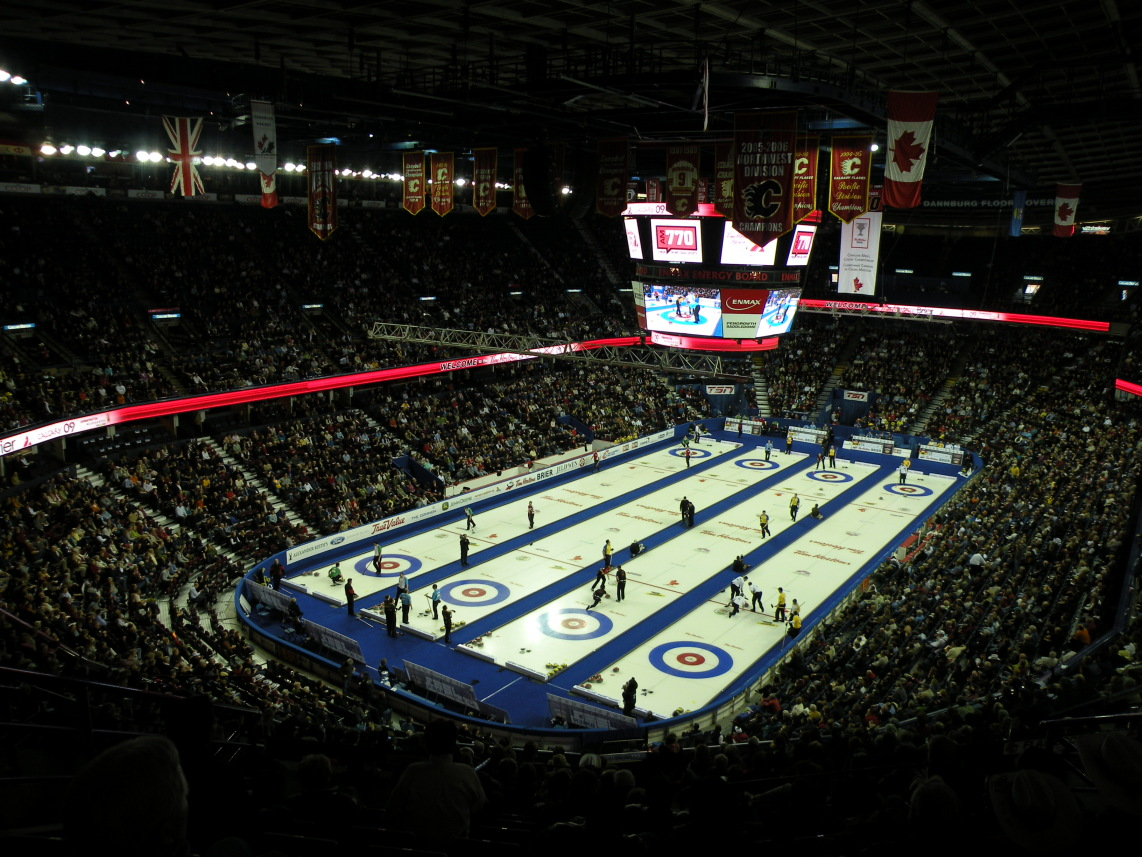
The Pengrowth Saddledome was the host arena of the Brier

The 2009 Tim Hortons Brier, the Canadian men's national curling championship, was held March 7–15 at the Pengrowth Saddledome in Calgary.

The Brier was billed as one of the best in history, as it included six former champion skips, as well as the defending Olympic champion Brad Gushue of Newfoundland and Labrador, who had yet to even win a Brier. The former champions included the defending champion Alberta rink, skipped by Kevin Martin, 2007 Brier champion Glenn Howard of Ontario, 2006 champion Jean-Michel Ménard of Quebec, 2004 champion Mark Dacey of Nova Scotia, 1996 & 1999 champion Jeff Stoughton of Manitoba, and 1987 & 1993 champion Russ Howard of New Brunswick (formerly from Ontario). Rounding out the field were Sean Geall of BC, Jamie Koe of the Territories, Joel Jordison of Saskatchewan, Mike Jakubo of Northern Ontario, and Rod MacDonald of PEI.

The Brier was also one of the most attended in history, with nearly 250,000 spectators.

The 2009 Brier featured one of the greatest Brier shots in history, when Glenn Howard made a seemingly impossible in-off "round the clock" double to score three to win his Draw 8 match against Saskatchewan. The Brier also featured one of the greatest games in history, between Ontario and Alberta in Draw 17. The Brier also included three "perfect" games where players scored 100%, including Kevin Martin in Draw 13.

Prior to the Brier, Sweep magazine gave both Alberta and Ontario 2:1 odds to win it. Many had expected a rematch of the 2008 Brier final between these two teams, and after the round robin, these teams finished first and second in the round robin. Alberta was undefeated while Ontario lost their final game to Alberta and an earlier match against Quebec. The two teams faced off in the 1 vs. 2 page playoff game, with Alberta's win putting them into the final, and sending Ontario to play Manitoba in the semi-final. Manitoba won this game in an upset, giving them the right to face the defending champions in the final.

== Teams ==
Alberta	British Columbia	Manitoba
Saville SC, Edmonton Skip: Kevin Martin; Third: John Morris; Second: Marc Kennedy; Lead: Ben Hebert; Alternate: Terry Meek	Royal City CC, New Westminster Skip: Sean Geall; Third: Brent Pierce; Second: Kevin Recksiedler; Lead: Mark Olson; Alternate: Tyler Klitch	Charleswood CC, Winnipeg Skip: Jeff Stoughton; Third: Kevin Park; Second: Rob Fowler; Lead: Steve Gould; Alternate: Randy Dutiaume
New Brunswick	Newfoundland and Labrador	Northern Ontario
Gage G&CC, Oromocto Skip: Russ Howard; Third: James Grattan; Second: Jason Vaughan; Lead: Peter Case; Alternate: Steve Howard	Bally Haly G&CC, St. John's Skip: Brad Gushue; Third: Mark Nichols; Second: Ryan Fry; Lead: Jamie Korab; Alternate: Glenn Goss	Copper Cliff CC, Copper Cliff Skip: Mike Jakubo; Third: Matt Seabrook; Second: Luc Ouimet; Lead: Lee Toner; Alternate: Scott Seabrook
Nova Scotia	Ontario	Prince Edward Island
Mayflower CC, Halifax Skip: Mark Dacey; Third: Bruce Lohnes; Second: Andrew Gibson; Lead: Kris Granchelli; Alternate: Mat Harris	Coldwater & District CC, Coldwater Skip: Glenn Howard; Third: Richard Hart; Second: Brent Laing; Lead: Craig Savill; Alternate: Steve Bice	Charlottetown CC, Charlottetown Skip: Rod MacDonald; Third: Kevin Champion; Second: Andrew Robinson; Lead: Mark O'Rourke; Alternate: Peter MacDonald
Quebec	Saskatchewan	Yukon/Northwest Territories
CC Victoria, Sainte-Foy; CC Etchemin, Saint-Romuald Skip: Jean-Michel Ménard; Third: Martin Crête; Second: Eric Sylvain; Lead: Jean Gagnon; Alternate: Philippe Ménard	Bushell Park CC, Moose Jaw Skip: Joel Jordison; Third: Scott Bitz; Second: Aryn Schmidt; Lead: Dean Hicke; Alternate: Rod Montgomery	Yellowknife CC, Yellowknife Skip: Jamie Koe; Third: Jon Solberg; Second: Brad Chorostkowski; Lead: Martin Gavin; Alternate: Tom Naugler

== Map of teams ==
Provincial Winners

== Round-robin standings ==
Final round-robin standings

Key
Teams to Playoffs
Teams to Tiebreaker

Locale	Skip	W	L	PF	PA	EW	EL	BE	SE	S%
Alberta	Kevin Martin	11	0	86	38	49	31	9	12	88%
Ontario	Glenn Howard	9	2	83	58	48	41	11	11	87%
Newfoundland and Labrador	Brad Gushue	8	3	81	55	49	39	5	13	83%
Manitoba	Jeff Stoughton	7	4	69	52	38	39	18	7	85%
Quebec	Jean-Michel Ménard	7	4	80	65	46	43	7	6	83%
British Columbia	Sean Geall	6	5	63	68	37	44	8	7	79%
New Brunswick	Russ Howard	6	5	69	66	46	38	10	11	82%
Saskatchewan	Joel Jordison	3	8	58	82	43	47	8	9	79%
Northwest Territories/Yukon	Jamie Koe	3	8	60	79	40	43	11	7	78%
Nova Scotia	Mark Dacey	2	9	58	87	40	51	5	10	76%
Northern Ontario	Mike Jakubo	2	9	52	82	40	49	10	4	77%
Prince Edward Island	Rod MacDonald	2	9	54	81	38	49	8	9	75%

== Results ==
All draw times are listed in Mountain Standard Time (UTC−7).

=== Draw 1 ===
Saturday, March 7, 13:00

Sheet A	1	2	3	4	5	6	7	8	9	10	Final
Saskatchewan (Jordison) 🔨	1	0	0	2	0	1	0	0	1	X	5
Quebec (Ménard)	0	3	1	0	1	0	0	2	0	X	7

Sheet B	1	2	3	4	5	6	7	8	9	10	Final
Nova Scotia (Dacey)	0	1	0	0	0	1	0	1	0	X	3
Manitoba (Stoughton) 🔨	1	0	0	2	2	0	1	0	2	X	8

Sheet C	1	2	3	4	5	6	7	8	9	10	Final
Northwest Territories/Yukon (Koe) 🔨	0	0	0	0	1	0	0	1	X	X	2
Prince Edward Island (MacDonald)	1	1	1	3	0	1	1	0	X	X	8

Sheet D	1	2	3	4	5	6	7	8	9	10	Final
Alberta (Martin) 🔨	3	0	2	0	1	0	0	0	1	X	7
New Brunswick (R. Howard)	0	1	0	2	0	1	0	0	0	X	4

=== Draw 2 ===
Saturday, March 7, 18:00

Sheet A	1	2	3	4	5	6	7	8	9	10	Final
Prince Edward Island (MacDonald) 🔨	0	1	2	0	0	0	1	1	0	X	5
Nova Scotia (Dacey)	1	0	0	2	1	2	0	0	2	X	8

Sheet B	1	2	3	4	5	6	7	8	9	10	Final
Ontario (G. Howard)	0	2	0	1	0	2	1	0	0	3	9
Newfoundland and Labrador (Gushue) 🔨	2	0	1	0	2	0	0	2	1	0	8

Sheet C	1	2	3	4	5	6	7	8	9	10	Final
British Columbia (Geall)	2	0	2	0	1	0	3	0	1	X	9
Northern Ontario (Jakubo) 🔨	0	1	0	1	0	1	0	1	0	X	4

Sheet D	1	2	3	4	5	6	7	8	9	10	Final
Northwest Territories/Yukon (Koe) 🔨	0	1	0	0	2	0	1	0	0	X	4
Manitoba (Stoughton)	0	0	0	3	0	2	0	3	1	X	9

=== Draw 3 ===
Sunday, March 8, 8:30

Sheet B	1	2	3	4	5	6	7	8	9	10	Final
New Brunswick (R. Howard) 🔨	1	0	1	2	0	3	0	1	1	X	9
Saskatchewan (Jordison)	0	2	0	0	1	0	1	0	0	X	4

Sheet C	1	2	3	4	5	6	7	8	9	10	Final
Alberta (Martin) 🔨	1	0	1	0	3	1	0	1	0	X	7
Quebec (Ménard)	0	2	0	1	0	0	1	0	1	X	5

=== Draw 4 ===
Sunday, March 8, 13:00

Sheet A	1	2	3	4	5	6	7	8	9	10	Final
Newfoundland and Labrador (Gushue)	0	1	0	1	1	0	5	0	2	X	10
British Columbia (Geall) 🔨	3	0	1	0	0	1	0	1	0	X	6

Sheet B	1	2	3	4	5	6	7	8	9	10	Final
Manitoba (Stoughton) 🔨	2	0	1	0	0	0	0	0	2	0	5
Prince Edward Island (MacDonald)	0	2	0	0	1	0	2	0	0	1	6

Sheet C	1	2	3	4	5	6	7	8	9	10	Final
Nova Scotia (Dacey)	2	0	1	0	0	0	0	1	0	X	4
Northwest Territories/Yukon (Koe) 🔨	0	2	0	2	1	0	1	0	2	X	8

Sheet D	1	2	3	4	5	6	7	8	9	10	Final
Ontario (G. Howard)	3	0	0	4	0	1	0	1	X	X	9
Northern Ontario (Jakubo) 🔨	0	2	0	0	0	0	0	0	X	X	2

=== Draw 5 ===
Sunday, March 8, 18:30

Sheet A	1	2	3	4	5	6	7	8	9	10	Final
Quebec (Ménard)	1	0	0	2	0	4	0	3	X	X	10
New Brunswick (R. Howard) 🔨	0	0	1	0	1	0	1	0	X	X	3

Sheet B	1	2	3	4	5	6	7	8	9	10	Final
British Columbia (Geall)	0	1	0	0	2	0	0	1	0	X	4
Ontario (G. Howard) 🔨	0	0	2	1	0	2	1	0	1	X	7

Sheet C	1	2	3	4	5	6	7	8	9	10	Final
Northern Ontario (Jakubo) 🔨	0	1	0	0	1	0	1	0	2	X	5
Newfoundland and Labrador (Gushue)	1	0	2	1	0	2	0	2	0	X	8

Sheet D	1	2	3	4	5	6	7	8	9	10	Final
Saskatchewan (Jordison)	0	0	1	0	0	1	1	0	X	X	3
Alberta (Martin) 🔨	1	3	0	2	4	0	0	1	X	X	11

=== Draw 6 ===
Monday, March 9, 8:30

Sheet A	1	2	3	4	5	6	7	8	9	10	Final
Alberta (Martin) 🔨	1	0	0	3	0	2	0	0	2	X	8
Northwest Territories/Yukon (Koe)	0	0	1	0	2	0	0	1	0	X	4

Sheet B	1	2	3	4	5	6	7	8	9	10	Final
New Brunswick (R. Howard)	0	2	1	2	0	1	1	0	3	X	10
Nova Scotia (Dacey) 🔨	2	0	0	0	2	0	0	3	0	X	7

Sheet C	1	2	3	4	5	6	7	8	9	10	11	Final
Saskatchewan (Jordison)	0	0	1	1	0	0	1	0	1	1	1	6
Prince Edward Island (MacDonald) 🔨	0	1	0	0	0	2	0	2	0	0	0	5

Sheet D	1	2	3	4	5	6	7	8	9	10	Final
Quebec (Ménard) 🔨	0	1	0	0	1	0	2	0	0	X	4
Manitoba (Stoughton)	3	0	0	0	0	3	0	1	0	X	7

=== Draw 7 ===
Monday, March 9, 13:00

Sheet A	1	2	3	4	5	6	7	8	9	10	Final
Nova Scotia (Dacey) 🔨	0	4	1	0	1	0	0	1	1	X	8
Northern Ontario (Jakubo)	1	0	0	0	0	1	1	0	0	X	3

Sheet B	1	2	3	4	5	6	7	8	9	10	Final
Northwest Territories/Yukon (Koe) 🔨	0	1	0	0	0	0	1	0	X	X	2
Newfoundland and Labrador (Gushue)	2	0	2	1	1	0	0	1	X	X	7

Sheet C	1	2	3	4	5	6	7	8	9	10	Final
Manitoba (Stoughton)	1	0	3	1	0	0	3	X	X	X	8
British Columbia (Geall) 🔨	0	1	0	0	0	1	0	X	X	X	2

Sheet D	1	2	3	4	5	6	7	8	9	10	Final
Prince Edward Island (MacDonald)	0	1	0	1	0	1	0	0	X	X	3
Ontario (G. Howard) 🔨	2	0	2	0	1	0	2	1	X	X	8

=== Draw 8 ===
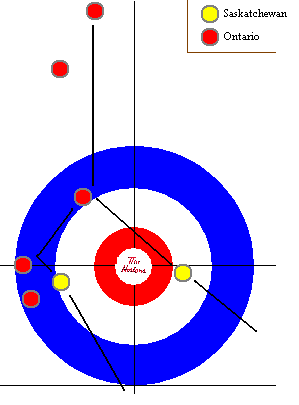
Howard's last shot in the Ontario vs. Saskatchewan game, considered to be one of the best curling shots in history.

Monday, March 9, 18:30

Sheet A	1	2	3	4	5	6	7	8	9	10	Final
Ontario (G. Howard) 🔨	0	0	2	0	1	0	0	1	0	3	7
Saskatchewan (Jordison)	0	2	0	1	0	1	1	0	1	0	6

Sheet B	1	2	3	4	5	6	7	8	9	10	Final
British Columbia (Geall)	0	2	1	2	0	0	1	1	X	X	7
Quebec (Ménard) 🔨	1	0	0	0	2	0	0	0	X	X	3

Sheet C	1	2	3	4	5	6	7	8	9	10	Final
Newfoundland and Labrador (Gushue)	0	1	1	0	0	1	0	1	0	0	4
Alberta (Martin) 🔨	1	0	0	1	0	0	1	0	0	2	5

Sheet D	1	2	3	4	5	6	7	8	9	10	Final
Northern Ontario (Jakubo)	0	2	0	2	0	1	0	1	0	X	6
New Brunswick (R. Howard) 🔨	2	0	2	0	1	0	2	0	2	X	9

=== Draw 9 ===
Tuesday, March 10, 8:30

Sheet A	1	2	3	4	5	6	7	8	9	10	Final
Newfoundland and Labrador (Gushue) 🔨	2	0	3	1	0	2	0	X	X	X	8
Quebec (Ménard)	0	2	0	0	1	0	1	X	X	X	4

Sheet B	1	2	3	4	5	6	7	8	9	10	Final
Northern Ontario (Jakubo) 🔨	0	1	0	2	0	2	0	1	0	1	7
Saskatchewan (Jordison)	0	0	2	0	0	0	2	0	1	0	5

Sheet C	1	2	3	4	5	6	7	8	9	10	Final
Ontario (G. Howard) 🔨	3	0	1	0	3	0	0	0	X	X	7
New Brunswick (R. Howard)	0	1	0	0	0	0	0	1	X	X	2

Sheet D	1	2	3	4	5	6	7	8	9	10	Final
British Columbia (Geall)	0	1	0	1	0	0	X	X	X	X	2
Alberta (Martin) 🔨	2	0	4	0	1	1	X	X	X	X	8

=== Draw 10 ===
Tuesday, March 10, 13:00

Sheet A	1	2	3	4	5	6	7	8	9	10	Final
New Brunswick (R. Howard)	1	0	2	0	1	0	1	0	0	X	5
Manitoba (Stoughton) 🔨	0	1	0	2	0	0	0	0	1	X	4

Sheet B	1	2	3	4	5	6	7	8	9	10	Final
Alberta (Martin) 🔨	5	1	0	3	0	2	X	X	X	X	11
Prince Edward Island (MacDonald)	0	0	2	0	2	0	X	X	X	X	4

Sheet C	1	2	3	4	5	6	7	8	9	10	Final
Quebec (Ménard) 🔨	1	0	2	1	0	5	0	3	X	X	12
Nova Scotia (Dacey)	0	3	0	0	1	0	1	0	X	X	5

Sheet D	1	2	3	4	5	6	7	8	9	10	Final
Saskatchewan (Jordison)	0	3	0	0	1	0	0	1	0	3	8
Northwest Territories/Yukon (Koe) 🔨	1	0	2	1	0	0	2	0	1	0	7

=== Draw 11 ===
Tuesday, March 10, 18:30

Sheet A	1	2	3	4	5	6	7	8	9	10	Final
Prince Edward Island (MacDonald) 🔨	0	0	0	0	1	0	1	0	1	X	3
British Columbia (Geall)	0	1	0	1	0	2	0	2	0	X	6

Sheet B	1	2	3	4	5	6	7	8	9	10	Final
Manitoba (Stoughton)	0	0	0	1	0	0	2	0	2	0	5
Ontario (G. Howard) 🔨	2	0	1	0	3	0	0	1	0	1	8

Sheet C	1	2	3	4	5	6	7	8	9	10	Final
Northwest Territories/Yukon (Koe) 🔨	0	2	0	3	1	0	0	1	0	X	7
Northern Ontario (Jakubo)	0	0	1	0	0	2	0	0	1	X	4

Sheet D	1	2	3	4	5	6	7	8	9	10	Final
Nova Scotia (Dacey) 🔨	0	1	0	2	0	2	0	1	0	X	6
Newfoundland and Labrador (Gushue)	1	0	1	0	2	0	2	0	3	X	9

=== Draw 12 ===
Wednesday, March 11, 8:30

Sheet A	1	2	3	4	5	6	7	8	9	10	Final
Northwest Territories/Yukon (Koe) 🔨	2	0	2	1	0	1	0	1	0	X	7
Ontario (G. Howard)	0	2	0	0	1	0	3	0	3	X	9

Sheet B	1	2	3	4	5	6	7	8	9	10	Final
Nova Scotia (Dacey)	0	1	0	1	0	1	1	0	X	X	4
British Columbia (Geall) 🔨	2	0	2	0	1	0	0	4	X	X	9

Sheet C	1	2	3	4	5	6	7	8	9	10	Final
Prince Edward Island (MacDonald)	0	1	0	0	1	0	X	X	X	X	2
Newfoundland and Labrador (Gushue) 🔨	1	0	2	1	0	4	X	X	X	X	8

Sheet D	1	2	3	4	5	6	7	8	9	10	Final
Manitoba (Stoughton)	2	0	2	0	1	0	0	1	0	X	6
Northern Ontario (Jakubo) 🔨	0	2	0	1	0	1	0	0	1	X	5

=== Draw 13 ===
Wednesday, March 11, 13:00

Sheet A	1	2	3	4	5	6	7	8	9	10	Final
Northern Ontario (Jakubo)	0	0	0	1	0	1	X	X	X	X	2
Alberta (Martin) 🔨	2	2	1	0	3	0	X	X	X	X	8

Sheet B	1	2	3	4	5	6	7	8	9	10	Final
Newfoundland and Labrador (Gushue)	0	2	1	0	2	0	1	0	2	X	8
New Brunswick (R. Howard) 🔨	1	0	0	1	0	2	0	1	0	X	5

Sheet C	1	2	3	4	5	6	7	8	9	10	Final
British Columbia (Geall)	0	3	0	5	0	2	0	X	X	X	10
Saskatchewan (Jordison) 🔨	1	0	1	0	2	0	2	X	X	X	6

Sheet D	1	2	3	4	5	6	7	8	9	10	Final
Ontario (G. Howard)	0	1	0	2	0	1	0	1	0	X	5
Quebec (Ménard) 🔨	2	0	1	0	3	0	1	0	1	X	8

=== Draw 14 ===
Wednesday, March 11, 18:30

Sheet A	1	2	3	4	5	6	7	8	9	10	Final
Saskatchewan (Jordison) 🔨	0	0	1	3	0	1	2	0	X	X	7
Nova Scotia (Dacey)	1	1	0	0	1	0	0	1	X	X	4

Sheet B	1	2	3	4	5	6	7	8	9	10	Final
Quebec (Ménard) 🔨	2	0	3	0	0	2	1	0	X	X	8
Northwest Territories/Yukon (Koe)	0	1	0	2	0	0	0	1	X	X	4

Sheet C	1	2	3	4	5	6	7	8	9	10	Final
Alberta (Martin) 🔨	2	0	1	1	0	2	1	X	X	X	7
Manitoba (Stoughton)	0	1	0	0	1	0	0	X	X	X	2

Sheet D	1	2	3	4	5	6	7	8	9	10	Final
New Brunswick (R. Howard) 🔨	0	2	1	2	0	1	1	0	X	X	7
Prince Edward Island (MacDonald)	2	0	0	0	1	0	0	1	X	X	4

=== Draw 15 ===
Thursday, March 12, 8:30

Sheet A	1	2	3	4	5	6	7	8	9	10	Final
Manitoba (Stoughton) 🔨	1	0	1	0	3	0	0	3	X	X	8
Newfoundland and Labrador (Gushue)	0	0	0	1	0	2	0	0	X	X	3

Sheet B	1	2	3	4	5	6	7	8	9	10	Final
Prince Edward Island (MacDonald) 🔨	1	0	2	0	1	0	0	2	0	0	6
Northern Ontario (Jakubo)	0	2	0	1	0	0	2	0	1	2	8

Sheet C	1	2	3	4	5	6	7	8	9	10	Final
Nova Scotia (Dacey) 🔨	2	0	1	0	1	0	2	0	0	X	6
Ontario (G. Howard)	0	2	0	1	0	2	0	1	3	X	9

Sheet D	1	2	3	4	5	6	7	8	9	10	Final
Northwest Territories/Yukon (Koe) 🔨	0	1	0	5	1	0	2	2	X	X	11
British Columbia (Geall)	0	0	2	0	0	1	0	0	X	X	3

=== Draw 16 ===
Thursday, March 12, 13:00

Sheet A	1	2	3	4	5	6	7	8	9	10	Final
Quebec (Ménard)	0	1	0	3	1	2	0	2	0	3	12
Prince Edward Island (MacDonald) 🔨	3	0	1	0	0	0	2	0	2	0	8

Sheet B	1	2	3	4	5	6	7	8	9	10	Final
Saskatchewan (Jordison)	1	0	1	0	0	1	0	2	X	X	5
Manitoba (Stoughton) 🔨	0	2	0	3	0	0	2	0	X	X	7

Sheet C	1	2	3	4	5	6	7	8	9	10	Final
New Brunswick (R. Howard)	0	4	0	2	0	2	3	X	X	X	11
Northwest Territories/Yukon (Koe) 🔨	1	0	1	0	2	0	0	X	X	X	4

Sheet D	1	2	3	4	5	6	7	8	9	10	Final
Alberta (Martin) 🔨	1	1	0	0	0	1	1	0	3	X	7
Nova Scotia (Dacey)	0	0	0	0	1	0	0	2	0	X	3

=== Draw 17 ===
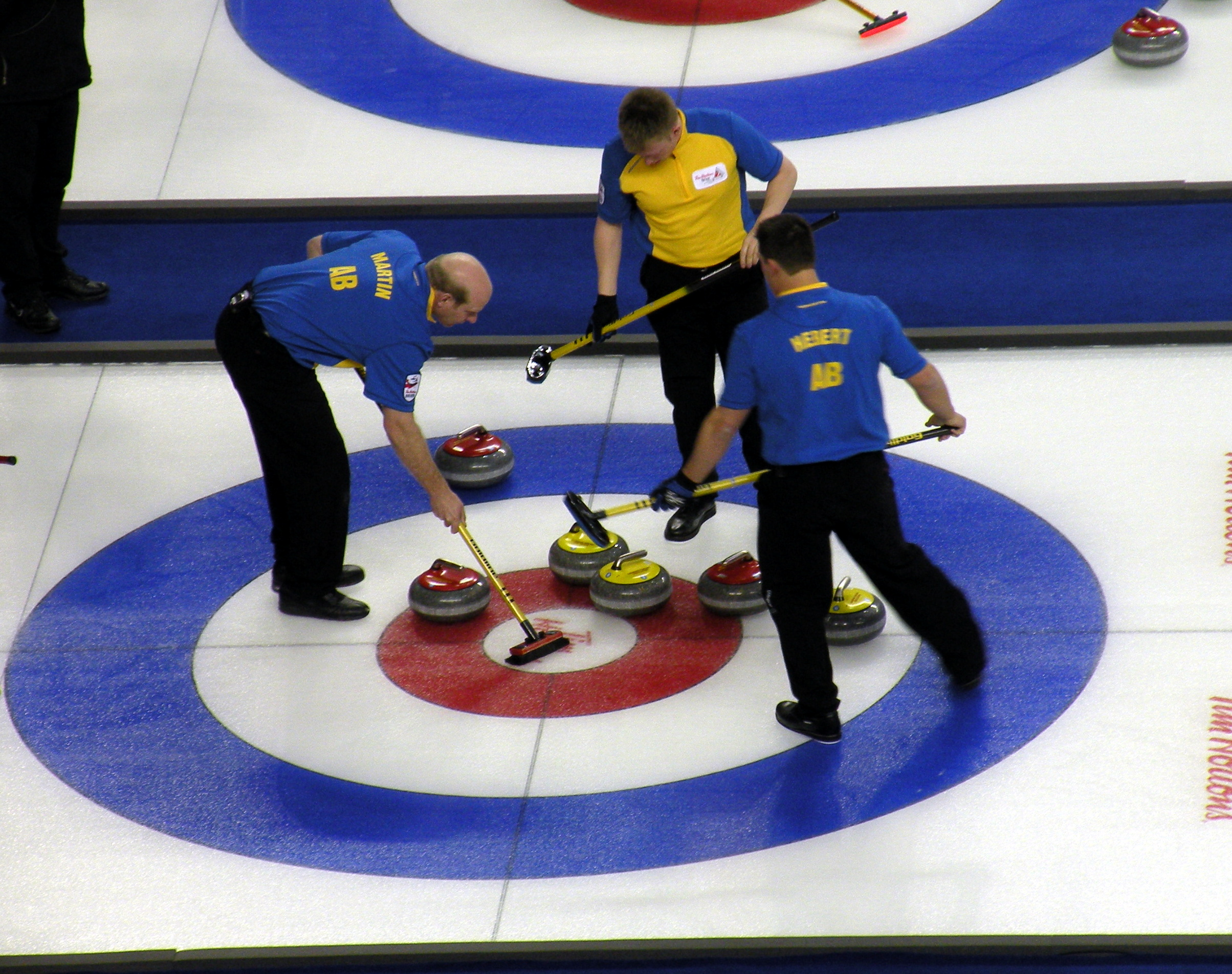
Team Alberta in action against Ontario

Thursday, March 12, 18:30

Sheet A	1	2	3	4	5	6	7	8	9	10	Final
British Columbia (Geall)	0	2	0	1	0	0	2	0	0	X	5
New Brunswick (R. Howard) 🔨	1	0	1	0	1	0	0	1	0	X	4

Sheet B	1	2	3	4	5	6	7	8	9	10	Final
Ontario (G. Howard)	1	0	1	0	0	1	0	2	0	0	5
Alberta (Martin) 🔨	0	1	0	0	2	0	1	0	2	1	7

Sheet C	1	2	3	4	5	6	7	8	9	10	11	Final
Northern Ontario (Jakubo)	0	1	0	1	0	1	0	2	0	1	0	6
Quebec (Ménard) 🔨	2	0	1	0	1	0	1	0	1	0	1	7

Sheet D	1	2	3	4	5	6	7	8	9	10	Final
Newfoundland and Labrador (Gushue) 🔨	2	2	0	1	0	2	0	1	X	X	8
Saskatchewan (Jordison)	0	0	1	0	1	0	1	0	X	X	3

== Tiebreaker ==
Friday, March 13, 13:00

Sheet C	1	2	3	4	5	6	7	8	9	10	Final
Manitoba (Stoughton) 🔨	1	0	2	0	0	2	0	0	0	1	6
Quebec (Ménard)	0	1	0	0	1	0	0	0	1	0	3

Player percentages
Manitoba		Quebec	
Steve Gould	91%	Jean Gagnon	84%
Rob Fowler	85%	Eric Sylvain	85%
Kevin Park	91%	Martin Crête	78%
Jeff Stoughton	91%	Jean-Michel Ménard	79%
Total	90%	Total	81%

== Playoffs ==
Page playoff system
1	Alberta	7
2	Ontario	6
3	Newfoundland and Labrador	7
4	Manitoba	8

Semifinal
2	Ontario	6
4	Manitoba	8

Final
1	Alberta	10
4	Manitoba	4

=== 1 vs. 2 ===
Friday, March 13, 18:00

Sheet C	1	2	3	4	5	6	7	8	9	10	11	Final
Alberta (Martin) 🔨	0	1	0	2	0	1	0	0	2	0	1	7
Ontario (G. Howard)	1	0	2	0	1	0	0	1	0	1	0	6

Player percentages
Alberta		Ontario	
Ben Hebert	85%	Craig Savill	91%
Marc Kennedy	92%	Brent Laing	81%
John Morris	83%	Richard Hart	85%
Kevin Martin	85%	Glenn Howard	85%
Total	86%	Total	85%

=== 3 vs. 4 ===
Saturday, March 14, 10:00

Sheet C	1	2	3	4	5	6	7	8	9	10	Final
Newfoundland and Labrador (Gushue) 🔨	1	0	1	0	1	0	2	1	1	0	7
Manitoba (Stoughton)	0	2	0	2	0	2	0	0	0	2	8

Player percentages
Newfoundland and Labrador		Manitoba	
Jamie Korab	94%	Steve Gould	91%
Ryan Fry	73%	Rob Fowler	88%
Mark Nichols	78%	Kevin Park	73%
Brad Gushue	88%	Jeff Stoughton	91%
Total	83%	Total	86%

=== Semifinal ===
Saturday, March 14, 18:00

Sheet C	1	2	3	4	5	6	7	8	9	10	Final
Ontario (G. Howard) 🔨	2	0	1	0	1	0	1	0	1	0	6
Manitoba (Stoughton)	0	4	0	1	0	1	0	1	0	1	8

Player percentages
Ontario		Manitoba	
Craig Savill	90%	Steve Gould	95%
Brent Laing	83%	Rob Fowler	83%
Richard Hart	83%	Kevin Park	88%
Glenn Howard	68%	Jeff Stoughton	80%
Total	81%	Total	86%

=== Final ===
Sunday, March 15, 18:00

Sheet C	1	2	3	4	5	6	7	8	9	10	Final
Alberta (Martin) 🔨	0	3	0	3	0	2	0	2	X	X	10
Manitoba (Stoughton)	0	0	1	0	2	0	1	0	X	X	4

Player percentages
Alberta		Manitoba	
Ben Hebert	86%	Steve Gould	100%
Marc Kennedy	93%	Rob Fowler	86%
John Morris	93%	Kevin Park	82%
Kevin Martin	97%	Jeff Stoughton	81%
Total	92%	Total	86%

== Statistics ==
=== Top 5 player percentages ===
Round Robin only

Leads	%
(Manitoba) Steve Gould	90
(Alberta) Ben Hebert	89
(Ontario) Craig Savill	88
(British Columbia) Mark Olson	87
(New Brunswick) Peter Case	87

Seconds	%
(Alberta) Marc Kennedy	91
(Quebec) Éric Sylvain	86
(Ontario) Brent Laing	85
(Manitoba) Rob Fowler	85
(New Brunswick) Jason Vaughan	81

Thirds	%
(Ontario) Richard Hart	88
(Alberta) John Morris	86
(Manitoba) Kevin Park	84
(New Brunswick) James Grattan	81
(Newfoundland and Labrador) Mark Nichols	81

Skips	%
(Alberta) Kevin Martin	89
(Ontario) Glenn Howard	88
(Newfoundland and Labrador) Brad Gushue	86
(Quebec) Jean-Michel Ménard	82
(New Brunswick) Russ Howard	80

== Awards and honours ==
All-Star Teams

First Team

- Skip: Kevin Martin (Alberta)
- Third: Richard Hart (Ontario)
- Second: Marc Kennedy (Alberta)
- Lead: Ben Hebert (Alberta)

Second Team

- Skip: Glenn Howard (Ontario)
- Third: John Morris (Alberta)
- Second: Eric Sylvain (Quebec)
- Lead: Steve Gould (Manitoba)

Hec Gervais Most Valuable Player Award

- Kevin Martin (Alberta)

Ross Harstone Award

- Dean Hicke (Saskatchewan)

Scotty Harper Award – Media Award

- Guy Scholz, Sweep Magazine – $500 award

Paul McLean Award

- Jeff Timson, Calgary Herald, Media Co-ordinator

== See also ==
- 2009 Scotties Tournament of Hearts
- 2009 Canadian Olympic Curling Trials
