= Marc Kennedy =

Canadian curler (born 1982)

- Curler
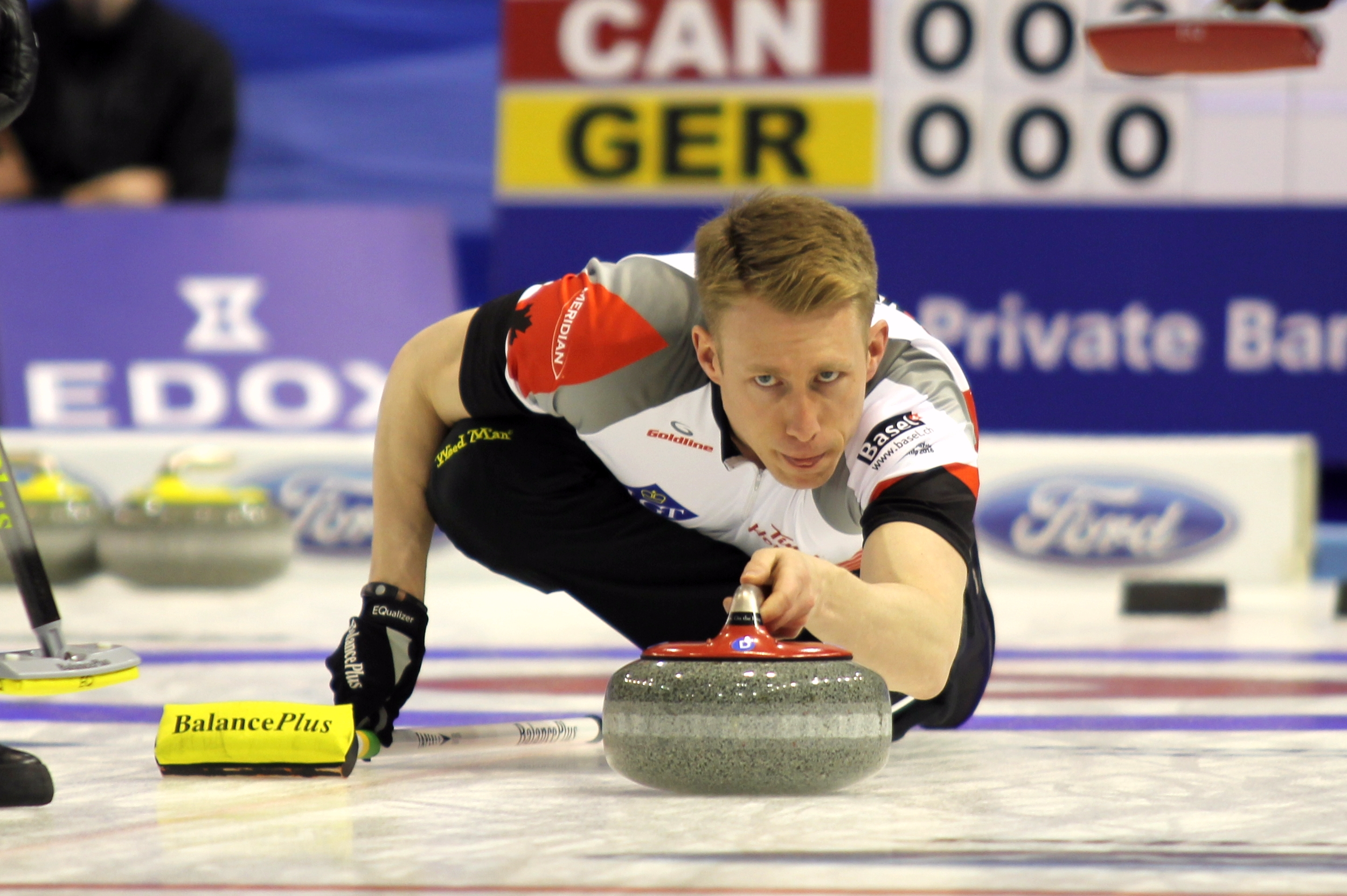
- Kennedy at the 2016 World Men's Curling Championship
- Born: February 5, 1982 (age 44); St. Albert, Alberta, Canada
- Height: 188 cm (6 ft 2 in)

Team
- Curling club: Saville Community SC; Edmonton, AB
- Skip: Brad Jacobs
- Third: Marc Kennedy
- Second: Brett Gallant
- Lead: Ben Hebert
- Alternate: Tyler Tardi

Curling career
- Member Association: Alberta (1998–2018, 2022–present); Northern Ontario (2019–2022)
- Brier: 15 (2007, 2008, 2009, 2011, 2013, 2015, 2016, 2017, 2020, 2021, 2022, 2023, 2024, 2025, 2026)
- World Championship: 5 (2008, 2009, 2016, 2021, 2025)
- Pan Continental Championship: 1 (2025)
- Olympic: 4 (2010, 2018, 2022, 2026)
- Top CTRS ranking: 1st (2006–07, 2007–08, 2009–10, 2010–11, 2015–16, 2019–20, 2024–25, 2025–26)
- Grand Slam victories: 18 (2004 Players', 2007 Canadian Open (Jan.), 2007 National (Mar.), 2007 Players', 2007 Canadian Open (Dec.), 2010 Canadian Open, 2010 Players', 2010 National (Dec.), 2011 Players', 2014 Players', 2015 Tour Challenge, 2018 Players', 2019 Tour Challenge, 2019 National, 2020 Canadian Open, 2023 Canadian Open, 2023 Champions Cup, 2026 National)
Medal record
Men's curling
Representing Canada
Olympic Games
Gold medal – first place	2010 Vancouver	Team
Gold medal – first place	2026 Milano Cortina	Team
Bronze medal – third place	2022 Beijing	Team
World Curling Championships
Gold medal – first place	2008 Grand Forks
Gold medal – first place	2016 Basel
Silver medal – second place	2009 Moncton
Bronze medal – third place	2025 Moose Jaw
Pan Continental Championships
Gold medal – first place	2025 Virginia
The Brier
Silver medal – second place	2017 St. John's
Bronze medal – third place	2026 St. John's
Universiade
Gold medal – first place	2003 Tarvisio
Representing Alberta
Canadian Olympic Curling Trials
Gold medal – first place	2009 Edmonton
Gold medal – first place	2017 Ottawa
Gold medal – first place	2025 Halifax
Bronze medal – third place	2005 Halifax
Bronze medal – third place	2013 Winnipeg
The Brier
Gold medal – first place	2008 Winnipeg
Gold medal – first place	2009 Calgary
Gold medal – first place	2016 Ottawa
Gold medal – first place	2025 Kelowna
Bronze medal – third place	2024 Regina
Canada Winter Games
Gold medal – first place	1999 Corner Brook
Representing Northern Ontario
Canadian Olympic Curling Trials
Silver medal – second place	2021 Saskatoon
Representing (Alberta) Wild Card
The Brier
Bronze medal – third place	2023 London

Marc Kennedy (born February 5, 1982) is a Canadian curler from St. Albert, Alberta. He currently plays third on Team Brad Jacobs. He is the gold medallist in 2010 Winter Olympics and 2026 Winter Olympics.

In 2019, Kennedy was named the greatest Canadian male second in history in a TSN poll of broadcasters, reporters, and top curlers.

== Career ==
Kennedy was born in St. Albert, Alberta, the son of Don and Connie. He started curling at age six. He is a Canadian Winter Games champion and three-time provincial junior champion. As a junior, he played second for Carter Rycroft at the 1998 Canadian Junior Curling Championships and played third for Jeff Erickson at the 1999 and 2001 Canadian Juniors. In 2003 Kennedy was an alternate for the 2003 Winter Universiade gold medal-winning team from Brandon University skipped by Mike McEwen.

=== 2003–2014: Early men's career and Team Martin ===
After 2-time World Junior Champion John Morris moved to Alberta in 2003, Kennedy joined his team at second position. In 2004, they lost the Canada Cup final to Randy Ferbey.

In 2006, both Morris and Kennedy joined 2-time Brier champion Kevin Martin on his new team. In 2008, Kennedy won the Brier and the World Championships as a member of the team. They repeated their Brier win in 2009, going undefeated for a second straight year and setting a record for consecutive Brier games won (26) previously held by the Ferbey foursome. In 2010, Kennedy won an Olympic Gold Medal in Vancouver with Kevin Martin, John Morris and Ben Hebert as Team Canada defeated Thomas Ulsrud of Norway 6-3 in the Gold Medal Game.

After a win at the Alberta provincials, Kennedy headed with Team Martin to the 2011 Tim Hortons Brier. They went through the round robin with a 9-2 win–loss record and lost the page 3 vs. 4 playoff game to Ontario and the bronze medal game to Newfoundland/Labrador. Kennedy left the Brier before the bronze medal game because he and his wife were expecting a new child.

In 2013, Kennedy and Team Martin won the Alberta provincials with a close win over Kevin Koe to earn a berth in the 2013 Tim Hortons Brier in their hometown Edmonton. On the first day, Kennedy won the Ford Hot Shots skills and shot-making competition that preceded the start of round-robin play. The team played in the 2013 Canadian Olympic Curling Trials, finishing third.

=== 2014–2019: Return to the Olympics, and stepping back ===
Following Kevin Martin's retirement from curling in 2014, Kennedy joined Team Kevin Koe at third. They played in their first Brier together in 2015, finishing with a 6-5 record, missing the playoffs. In December 2015, Kennedy, along with his teammates, claimed the first berth in the 2017 Canadian Olympic Curling Trials with their Canada Cup victory in Grande Prairie, AB. The team continued their winning ways that season by winning the 2016 Tim Hortons Brier and a gold medal at the 2016 World Men's Curling Championship. Representing Team Canada as defending champions, the team lost in the final of the 2017 Tim Hortons Brier. The team would go on to win the 2017 Canadian Olympic Curling Trials, and represented Canada at the 2018 Winter Olympics, finishing fourth.

Following the 2017-2018 season, Kennedy announced he would take a break from competitive curling to heal injuries and focus on family. He subsequently took a position as national team program performance consultant with Curling Canada. While still formally taking a break from competitive curling, he played third for team Brad Jacobs at the 2018 Canada Cup, to fill in for Ryan Fry, who took a couple of events off, following unsportsmanlike behaviour from an event he played in. Kennedy's addition to the team worked out, and they would win the event.

=== 2019–2022: Northern Ontario and Kennedy's third Olympics ===
Kennedy announced in March 2019 that he would join Team Jacobs to replace Fry for the next three curling seasons. In their first event, the 2019 AMJ Campbell Shorty Jenkins Classic, the team went undefeated up until the final where they would lose to Team Epping. Team Jacobs won three straight Grand Slam events at the Tour Challenge, National and the Canadian Open. They would unsurprisingly win the 2020 Northern Ontario Men's Provincial Curling Championship, going in as the number one seed. At the 2020 Tim Hortons Brier, they battled through two tiebreakers before losing to Newfoundland and Labrador's Brad Gushue in the 3 vs. 4 game, all within the same day. It would be the team's last event of the season as both the Players' Championship and the Champions Cup Grand Slam events were cancelled due to the COVID-19 pandemic.

Team Jacobs played in two tour events during the 2020–21 season, winning the Stu Sells Oakville Tankard and losing in the qualification game of the Ashley HomeStore Curling Classic. Due to the COVID-19 pandemic in Ontario, the 2021 provincial championship was cancelled. As the reigning provincial champions, Team Jacobs was chosen to represent Northern Ontario at the 2021 Tim Hortons Brier. At the Brier, they finished with a 7–5 record. Also during the 2020–21 season, Kennedy served as the alternate for the Brendan Bottcher rink at the 2021 World Men's Curling Championship. He was added to the team as a backup plan in case Bottcher's third Darren Moulding's back injury that he sustained during the 2021 Canadian Mixed Doubles Curling Championship re-emerged as an issue. Kennedy, however, did not have to play in any games for the team as Moulding's back held up for the tournament.

Kennedy and Team Jacobs would compete at the 2021 Canadian Olympic Curling Trials, where they would lose to Brad Gushue 4–3 in the final. However, Kennedy was named to a third Olympic team as Gushue selected him as the alternate for his rink for the Beijing 2022 Olympics. The team would go onto win the bronze medal with an 8-5 win over the United States.

=== 2022–2024: Return to Alberta and Team Bottcher ===
Kennedy would later announce that he would be returning to Alberta and joining a new team skipped by Brendan Bottcher, alongside former teammate Hebert as lead, and teammate from Gushue's Olympic team, Brett Gallant as second. The Bottcher rink began their first season together by winning the 2022 ATB Okotoks Classic. A week later, they played in the inaugural PointsBet Invitational, making it to the semifinals before losing to Matt Dunstone. A few weeks later, the team played in their first Slam together at the 2022 National. After going 3–1 in pool play, they lost in the quarterfinals to Korey Dropkin. Then, they played in the 2022 Tour Challenge where they lost all of their games. They rebounded at the 2022 Masters winning all four of their pool games, and then made it as far as the semifinals where they lost to Joël Retornaz of Italy in a low scoring 3–1 affair. The team began the 2023 calendar year at the 2023 Canadian Open where they won all of their games to win their first Grand Slam title as a foursome. The following month, they played in the 2023 Boston Pizza Cup provincial championship. There, they won all of their games until the final, where they lost to their provincial rivals Kevin Koe who had inherited Bottcher's former front end of Martin and Thiessen. Due to their performance on the tour that season, they still qualified for the 2023 Tim Hortons Brier as the Wild Card #1 entry. At the Brier, Bottcher led the team to a 7–1 record in pool play. The team then made it into the 3 vs. 4 page playoff game after losing to Manitoba (Matt Dunstone) in the qualification final. In the 3 vs. 4 game, they beat Ontario (Mike McEwen), but then lost in the semifinal when they faced off against Dunstone again, settling for third place. At the final two slams of the year, the team missed the playoffs at the 2023 Players' Championship after going 2–3, but rebounded to go undefeated and win the 2023 Champions Cup. In a change in the qualification format, the Bottcher rink automatically pre-qualified for the 2024 Montana's Brier field based on their 2022–23 Canadian Team Ranking Standings, which meant they bypassed the provincial qualifiers. At the 2024 Brier, the team went 6–2 in their pool, then in the playoffs lost to Gushue in the 1v2 game, and finished 3rd after losing to McEwen in the semifinal. On April 16, 2024, Bottcher's teammates made an announcement that they would be "going in a new direction" at skip, resulting in Bottcher's departure after two seasons. Kennedy, Gallant, and Hebert later announced they would be adding Brad Jacobs as their new skip for the 2024–25 season.

=== 2024–present: Team Jacobs and Kennedy's fourth Olympics ===
In their first season together, the Jacobs team enjoyed plenty of success, finishing second at the 2024 National and the 2025 Masters grand slam events. Like the previous season, the Jacobs team pre-qualified for the 2025 Brier based on their CTRS ranking, which meant they bypassed the provincial qualifiers. At the 2025 Montana's Brier, the Jacobs rink would go on to win the national championship, beating Dunstone in the final and qualifying to represent Canada at the 2025 World Men's Curling Championship. At the 2025 World's, the Jacobs rink would go 11–1 in round robin play, but would lose to Scotland's Bruce Mouat in the semi-final. The team would rebound to win the bronze medal, beating China's Xu Xiaoming 11–2 in the bronze medal game.

Team Jacobs would start the 2025–26 curling season winning the 2025 Pan Continental Curling Championships, beating John Shuster of the United States 7–3 in the final. They finished as semifinalists at the 2025 Masters and 2025 GSOC Tahoe. Team Jacobs would again try to return to the Olympics at the 2025 Canadian Olympic Curling Trials. There, they would finish the round robin in first place with a 6–1 record, and would then beat Matt Dunstone in both games of their best-of-three final to represent Canada at the 2026 Winter Olympics. This would be Kennedy's fourth Olympics, setting a record for the most Olympic appearances for a Canadian curler.

==== 2026 Olympics controversy ====
During the 2026 Olympic Games in Italy, a video showed Kennedy touching the granite part of the stone (which is against the rules), while throwing the rock, and subsequently being involved in a verbal altercation with Oskar Eriksson on team Sweden, in which Kennedy told him to "fuck off".

The confusion came from World Curling's official rules which allow for "double touches" of the stone's handle before the hog line, but that touching the granite part of the stone (not the handle) is not allowed. World Curling clarified these rules following the game, stating that "[d]uring forward motion, touching the granite of the stone is not allowed. This will result in the stone being removed from play."

Beyond the disputed play, some viewers and experts criticized what they perceived as unsportsmanlike conduct during the on-ice altercation between Kennedy and Eriksson, and after the game. World Curling issued a verbal warning to Canadian officials over inappropriate language used by Kennedy, stating that any further misconduct would lead to additional sanctions.

Following the Canada–Sweden match, Kennedy stated that his only regret was the language that he used. He felt that Sweden had "come up with a plan" to catch hog line violations, as they had used video footage that did not come from the official Olympic Broadcasting Services.

Kennedy was accused of the same offence by team Switzerland and reported to officials during Canada's next match on 14 February 2026, with Pablo Lachat-Couchepin commenting, "I saw [Kennedy do it] when the referee was next to me."

== Personal life ==
Kennedy is married to Nicole Kennedy (née MacDonald), and they have two daughters. His brother Glen is also a curler.

Kennedy has a marketing degree from the University of Alberta. He was a franchise owner for M&M Meat Shops until he sold his business in 2012 to focus more on curling. He also worked as a real estate agent for Sarasota Realty.

Kennedy is a Hec Gervais Scholarship winner, as well as a Can Fund recipient He is also currently an MBA Student at the University of Alberta.

Marc and Nicole began a youth bonspiel in 2016 called the Marc Kennedy Junior Classic, held in St. Albert and Edmonton. The bonspiel saw a spin-off program in 2018 (Over The Pond) introducing international teams selected through the Nordic Junior Curling Tour. Two Canadian teams are also selected and visit the year-end event in Sweden. Unofficially, the MKJC is the largest youth/junior bonspiel in the World.

In his youth, Kennedy also played Canadian football and played for the Edmonton Huskies.

== Teams ==
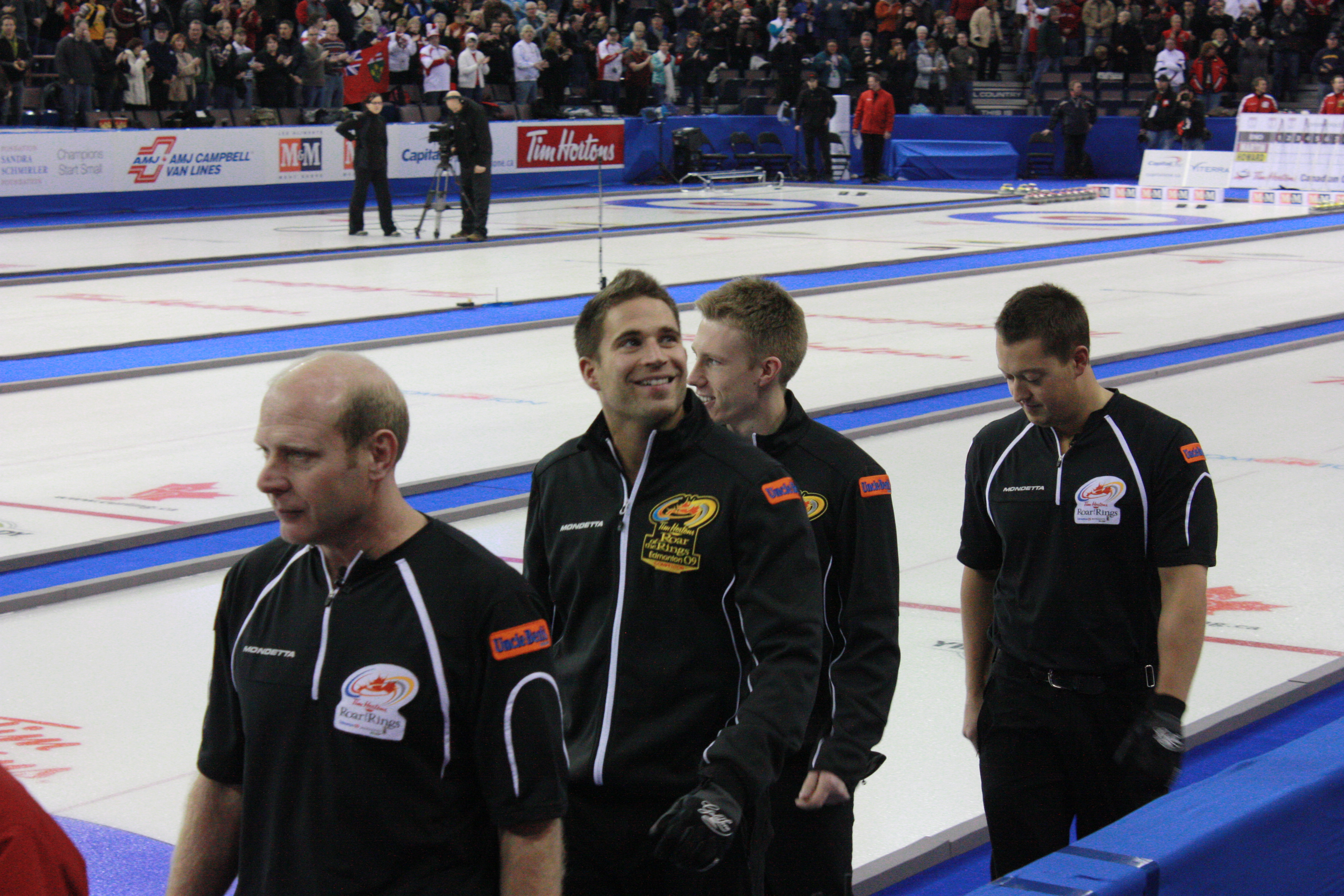
From left: Kevin Martin, John Morris, Kennedy, Ben Hebert, 2009

Season	Skip	Third	Second	Lead	Events
1996–97	Glen Kennedy	Gerald Pelletier	Marc Kennedy	Kevin Skarban	
1997–98	Carter Rycroft	Glen Kennedy	Marc Kennedy	Jason Lesmeister	1998 CJCC
1998–99	Jeff Erickson	Marc Kennedy	Kevin Skarban	Kevin McNee	1999 CJCC
1999–00	Jeff Erickson	Marc Kennedy	Kevin Skarban	Kevin McNee	
2000–01	Jeff Erickson	Marc Kennedy	Kevin Skarban	Aaron Sarafinchan	2001 CJCC
2001–02	Marc Kennedy	Chris Schille	Kevin Skarban	Aaron Sarafinchan	
2002–03	Chris Schille	Marc Kennedy	Steven Meadows	Stephen Jensen	
2003–04	John Morris	Kevin Koe	Marc Kennedy	Paul Moffatt	2004 Alta., CC
2004–05	John Morris	Kevin Koe	Marc Kennedy	Paul Moffatt	2005 Alta., CC
2005–06	John Morris	Kevin Koe	Marc Kennedy	Paul Moffatt	2005 COCT, 2006 Alta., CC
2006–07	Kevin Martin	John Morris	Marc Kennedy	Ben Hebert	2007 Alta., CC, Brier
2007–08	Kevin Martin	John Morris	Marc Kennedy	Ben Hebert	2008 Alta., CC, Brier, WCC
2008–09	Kevin Martin	John Morris	Marc Kennedy	Ben Hebert	2009 Alta., CC, Brier, WCC
2009–10	Kevin Martin	John Morris	Marc Kennedy	Ben Hebert	2009 COCT, 2010 OG
2010–11	Kevin Martin	John Morris	Marc Kennedy	Ben Hebert	2010 CC, 2011 Alta., Brier
2011–12	Kevin Martin	John Morris	Marc Kennedy	Ben Hebert	2011 CC, 2012 Alta.
2012–13	Kevin Martin	John Morris	Marc Kennedy	Ben Hebert	2012 CC, 2013 Alta., Brier
2013–14	Kevin Martin	David Nedohin	Marc Kennedy	Ben Hebert	2013 COCT, 2014 Alta.
2014–15	Kevin Koe	Marc Kennedy	Brent Laing	Ben Hebert	2014 CC, 2015 Alta., Brier
2015–16	Kevin Koe	Marc Kennedy	Brent Laing	Ben Hebert	2015 CC, 2016 Alta., Brier, WCC
2016–17	Kevin Koe	Marc Kennedy	Brent Laing	Ben Hebert	2016 CC, 2017 Brier
2017–18	Kevin Koe	Marc Kennedy	Brent Laing	Ben Hebert	2017 COCT, 2018 OG
2018	Brad Jacobs	Marc Kennedy	E. J. Harnden	Ryan Harnden	2018 CC (lone event)
2019–20	Brad Jacobs	Marc Kennedy	E. J. Harnden	Ryan Harnden	2019 CC, 2020 Northern Ont., Brier
2020–21	Brad Jacobs	Marc Kennedy	E. J. Harnden	Ryan Harnden	2021 Brier
2021–22	Brad Jacobs	Marc Kennedy	E. J. Harnden	Ryan Harnden	2021 COCT, 2022 Brier
2021–22	Brad Gushue	Mark Nichols	Brett Gallant	Geoff Walker alt.: Marc Kennedy	2022 OG
2022–23	Brendan Bottcher	Marc Kennedy	Brett Gallant	Ben Hebert	2023 Alta., Brier
2023–24	Brendan Bottcher	Marc Kennedy	Brett Gallant	Ben Hebert	2024 Brier
2024–25	Brad Jacobs	Marc Kennedy	Brett Gallant	Ben Hebert	2025 Brier, WCC
2025–26	Brad Jacobs	Marc Kennedy	Brett Gallant	Ben Hebert	2025 COCT, 2026 OG, Brier
2026–27	Brad Jacobs	Marc Kennedy	Brett Gallant	Ben Hebert	

== Awards and recognitions ==
- Brier: First Team All Star, Second - 2007, 2008, 2009 and 2011
- Brier: First Team All-Star, Third - 2022 and 2024
- Brier: Second Team All-Star, Second - 2013
- Brier: Second Team All-Star, Third - 2015, 2020, 2025 and 2026
- World Men's Curling Championship: All-Star Third - 2025
- World Curling Tour MVP 2008
- University Of Alberta Award of Excellence 2010
- TSN Top Male Second Of All Time 2019
- TSN #8 Top Male Player Of All Time 2019

== See also ==
- List of Canadian sports personalities
