= Joel Jordison =

Canadian curler

- Curler
- Born: March 11, 1978 (age 48); Moose Jaw, Saskatchewan, Canada

Team
- Curling club: Moose Jaw CC, Moose Jaw, Saskatchewan, Canada
- Skip: Joel Jordison
- Third: Jason Ackerman
- Second: Brent Goeres
- Lead: Curtis Horwath

Curling career
- Brier: 1 (2009)
- Top CTRS ranking: 9th (2006-07)

Joel Jordison (born March 11, 1978) is a Canadian curler from Moose Jaw, Saskatchewan. Jordison currently skips his own team from Moose Jaw.

== Career ==
Jordison is a former Saskatchewan junior curling champion, having won the title with current third Jason Ackerman.

With third Scott Bitz, second Aryn Schmidt, and lead Dean Hicke, Jordison became a men's provincial champion with a win at the 2009 SaskTel Tankard with a win over Pat Simmons, which broke Simmons' streak of four consecutive provincial titles. With this win, Jordison won the right to represent Saskatchewan at the Brier that same year, where they finished with a 3–8 win–loss record. Jordison and his team also played at the 2009 qualifier to the Canadian Olympic Curling Trials, but failed to win a game.

Jordison joined Steve Laycock in 2011 after a partnership with Jason Jacobson in the previous season to replace Simmons, who left Laycock's team to join Kevin Koe. After one year with Laycock, Jordison reunited with Ackerman to form a new team with Brent Goeres and Curtis Horwath.

On the World Curling Tour, Jordison has seen some success, with some Grand Slam appearances and runner-up finishes in World Curling Tour events. He has won one event to date, the 2007 Whites Drug Store Classic.

== Teams ==
Season	Skip	Third	Second	Lead	Events
1998–99	Dave Manser	Joel Jordison	Kevin Aberle	Aaron Geib	
1998–99	Delvin Moch	Blaine Kunz	Joel Jordison	Kevin Aberle	
1999–00	Rod Montgomery	Scott Montgomery	Joel Jordison	Brad Montgomery	
2002–03	Pat Simmons	Joel Jordison	Ryan Miller	Neil Cursons	
2009–10	Joel Jordison	Scott Bitz	Aryn Schmidt	Dean Hicke	2009 Sask., Brier
2010–11	Joel Jordison	Jason Jacobson	Josh Heidt	Brock Montgomery	
2011–12	Steve Laycock	Joel Jordison	Brennen Jones	Dallan Muyres	
2012–13	Joel Jordison	Jason Ackerman	Brent Goeres	Curtis Horwath	
