= 2009 Canadian Olympic Curling Trials =

- Host city: Edmonton, Alberta
- Arena: Rexall Place
- Dates: December 6–13
- Attendance: 175,852
- Men's winner: (Alberta) Team Martin
- Curling club: Saville Sports Centre, Edmonton
- Skip: Kevin Martin
- Third: John Morris
- Second: Marc Kennedy
- Lead: Ben Hebert
- Alternate: Adam Enright
- Coach: Jules Owchar
- Finalist: (Ontario) Glenn Howard
- Women's winner: (Alberta) Team Bernard
- Curling club: Calgary Winter Club, Calgary
- Skip: Cheryl Bernard
- Third: Susan O'Connor
- Second: Carolyn Darbyshire
- Lead: Cori Bartel
- Alternate: Kristie Moore
- Coach: Dennis Balderston
- Finalist: (Alberta) Shannon Kleibrink

The 2009 Canadian Olympic Curling Trials (branded as the 2009 Tim Hortons Roar of the Rings presented by Monsanto for sponsorship reasons) were held December 6–13, 2009 at Rexall Place in Edmonton. The event is also known and advertised as Roar of the Rings. The winner of the men's and women's events represented Canada at the 2010 Winter Olympics. Canada was guaranteed a team in each event as hosts.

== Canadian Olympic qualification process ==
For both men's and women's categories, a pool of sixteen teams is designated as eligible to be Canada's representative at the 2010 Olympics. From the pool of sixteen, four teams are selected to qualify directly for the 2009 Canadian Curling Trials, "The 2009 Roar of the Rings". The remaining twelve teams compete in a pre-trials tournament, which is a triple-knockout bonspiel, with four teams advancing to the eight-team trials. The winner of the trials represents Canada at the 2010 Olympics.

=== Pool of sixteen ===
For each of the three curling seasons from 2006–07 to 2008–09, four teams are named to the pool of sixteen, resulting in a total of twelve teams in the pool by the end of the 2008–09 season. The four teams are the following:

- winner of the Canadian Men's/Women's Curling Championships
- winner of the Canada Cup tournament
- winner of the Players' Championships
- leader in the Canadian Team Ranking System for that season

If a team qualifies under more than one criterion (for example, a team wins both the Canada Cup and is the leader in the CTRS standings) or has already qualified in a previous season, then the four spots for that season are rounded out by selecting the highest ranked teams in the season's CTRS standings that have not already qualified.

To select the remaining four teams for the pool of sixteen, after the 2008–2009 season, from the teams that have not already qualified, the highest ranked teams are chosen, based on three-season, two-season, and one-season rankings. The rankings are determined by adding up the CTRS points earned by each team in their best events in each season.

Seasons	Category	Qualifiers	Number of events included	Formula
2006–07 to 2008–09	Men	Top team not already qualified	best 8 events in 2006–07; best 10 events in each other season	70% of 2006–07 CTRS points + 85% of 2007–08 CTRS points + 100% of 2008–09 CTRS points
2006–07 to 2008–09	Women	Top team not already qualified	best 6 events in 2006–07; best 8 events in each other season	70% of 2006–07 CTRS points + 85% of 2007–08 CTRS points + 100% of 2008–09 CTRS points
2007–08 to 2008–09	Men	Top two teams not already qualified	best 10 events in each season	85% of 2007–08 CTRS points + 100% of 2008–09 CTRS points
2007–08 to 2008–09	Women	Top two teams not already qualified	best 8 events in each season	85% of 2007–08 CTRS points + 100% of 2008–09 CTRS points
2008–09	Men	Top team not already qualified	best 10 events	100% of 2008–09 CTRS points
2008–09	Women	Top team not already qualified	best 8 events	100% of 2008–09 CTRS points

If a team's membership changes from one season to another, the CTRS points earned by the team are divided amongst the individual players and allocated to their new teams.

=== Direct qualifiers to the Olympic Trials ===
From the pool of sixteen, the first four teams who meet any one of the following criteria (in order of priority) will be qualified directly for the Canadian Olympic Trials.

- team leads the CTRS standings in two of the three curling seasons from 2006–07 to 2008–09
- team wins three of the following events in the seasons from 2006–07 to 2008–09:
  - Canada Cup tournament
  - Players' Championships
  - Canadian Men's/Women's Curling Championships
  - World Curling Championships
- team not yet qualified for the Olympic Trials with the highest CTRS point total from 2006–07 to 2008–09, using the same formula used to qualify teams to the pool of sixteen
- team not yet qualified for the Olympic Trials with the highest CTRS point total from 2007–08 to 2008–09, using the same formula used to qualify teams to the pool of sixteen

== Pre-trials qualifier ==
The pre-trials tournament was held on November 10–15, 2009 at the CN Centre in Prince George, British Columbia. The twelve teams from the pool of sixteen that did not qualify directly for the Olympic trials participated in a triple-knockout competition that selected four additional teams to compete in the Olympic Trials.

=== Qualified teams ===
==== Men's ====
Skip	Third/Vice skip	Second	Lead	Alternate	City	Criteria met
Kerry Burtnyk	Don Walchuk	Richard Daneault	Garth Smith		Winnipeg	Highest CTRS point total in 2007–08 season of teams not already qualified
Pat Simmons	Gerry Adam	Jeff Sharp	Steve Laycock	Warren Jackson	Davidson	Highest CTRS point total in 2007–08 season of teams not already qualified
Jeff Stoughton	Kevin Park	Rob Fowler	Steve Gould		Winnipeg	Highest CTRS point total in 2007–08 season of teams not already qualified
Wayne Middaugh	Jon Mead	John Epping	Scott Bailey	Trevor Wall	Islington, Toronto	Highest CTRS point total in 2007–08 season of teams not already qualified
Brad Gushue	Mark Nichols	Ryan Fry	Jamie Korab		St. John's	Highest CTRS point total in 2008–09 season of teams not already qualified
Mike McEwen	B. J. Neufeld	Matt Wozniak	Denni Neufeld		Winnipeg	Highest CTRS point total in 2008–09 season of teams not already qualified
Joel Jordison	Scott Bitz	Aryn Schmidt	Dean Hicke		Moose Jaw	
Bob Ursel	Jim Cotter	Kevin Folk	Rick Sawatsky		Kelowna	
Jean-Michel Ménard	Martin Crête	Éric Sylvain	Jean Gagnon		Lévis	
Ted Appelman	Tom Appelman	Bradon Klassen	Brendan Melnyk		Edmonton	
Greg McAulay	Ken Maskiewich	Deane Horning	Aaron Watson		Richmond	
Jason Gunnlaugson	Justin Richter	Braden Zawada	Tyler Forrest		Beausejour	

==== Women's ====
Skip	Third	Second	Lead	Alternate	City	Criteria met
Kelly Scott	Jeanna Schraeder	Sasha Carter	Jacquie Armstrong	Michelle Allen	Kelowna	Winner of 2006–07 Canadian Women's Championship
Sherry Anderson	Kim Hodson	Heather Walsh	Donna Gignac		Delisle	Highest CTRS points total in 2006–07 season of teams not already qualified
Amber Holland	Kim Schneider	Tammy Schneider	Heather Seeley		Regina	Winner of 2007–08 Players' Championship
Sherry Middaugh	Kirsten Wall	Kim Moore	Andra Harmark		Coldwater	Highest CTRS points total in 2007–08 season of teams not already qualified
Marie-France Larouche	Nancy Bélanger	Annie Lemay	Joëlle Sabourin		Quebec City	Highest CTRS point total in 2008–09 season of teams not already qualified
Michelle Englot	Deanna Doig	Roberta Materi	Cindy Simmons		Regina	Highest CTRS point total in 2008–09 season of teams not already qualified
Heather Rankin	Lisa Eyamie	Heather Moulding	Kyla MacLachlan		Calgary	Highest CTRS point total in 2008–09 season of teams not already qualified
Rachel Homan	Emma Miskew	Alison Kreviazuk	Lynn Kreviazuk		Ottawa	Highest CTRS point total in 2008–09 season of teams not already qualified
Krista McCarville	Tara George	Kari MacLean-Kraft	Lorraine Lang		Thunder Bay	Highest three-season CTRS point total from 2006–07 to 2008–09 of teams not already qualified
Cathy King	Kaitlyn Lawes	Raylene Rocque	Tracy Bush		Edmonton	Highest two-season CTRS point total from 2007–08 to 2008–09 of teams not already qualified
Eve Belisle	Brenda Nicholls	Martine Comeau	Julie Rainville		Montreal	Highest two-season CTRS point total from 2007–08 to 2008–09 of teams not already qualified
Crystal Webster	Lori Olson-Johns	Samantha Preston	Stephanie Malekoff	Desiree Owen	Calgary	Highest CTRS point total in 2008–09 season of teams not already qualified

=== Men's Tournament Brackets ===
==== A Event ====
Round of 16
(Alberta) Ted Appelman	7
(British Columbia) Bob Ursel	11
(Manitoba) Kerry Burtnyk	8
(Manitoba) Jason Gunnlaugson	3
(Saskatchewan) Joel Jordison	4
(British Columbia) Greg McAulay	6
(Quebec) Jean-Michel Ménard	4
(Saskatchewan) Pat Simmons	7

Quarterfinals
(British Columbia) Bob Ursel	1
(Manitoba) Jeff Stoughton	7
(Manitoba) Kerry Burtnyk	2
(Manitoba) Mike McEwen	8
(British Columbia) Greg McAulay	5
(Newfoundland and Labrador) Brad Gushue	8
(Saskatchewan) Pat Simmons	9
(Ontario) Wayne Middaugh	6

Semifinals
(Manitoba) Jeff Stoughton	4
(Manitoba) Mike McEwen	2
(Newfoundland and Labrador) Brad Gushue	7
(Saskatchewan) Pat Simmons	12

A Qualifier
(Manitoba) Jeff Stoughton	8
(Saskatchewan) Pat Simmons	7

==== B Event ====
Round of 16
(Alberta) Ted Appelman	10
(Manitoba) Jason Gunnlaugson	8
(Saskatchewan) Joel Jordison	6
(Quebec) Jean-Michel Ménard	9
(British Columbia) Bob Ursel	8
(Manitoba) Kerry Burtnyk	3
(British Columbia) Greg McAulay	6
(Ontario) Wayne Middaugh	11

Quarterfinals
(Newfoundland and Labrador) Brad Gushue	6
(Alberta) Ted Appelman	7
(Manitoba) Mike McEwen	8
(Quebec) Jean-Michel Ménard	7
(British Columbia) Bob Ursel	4
(Ontario) Wayne Middaugh	6

Semifinals
(Alberta) Ted Appelman	4
(Manitoba) Mike McEwen	7
(Saskatchewan) Pat Simmons	7
(Ontario) Wayne Middaugh	6

B Qualifier
(Manitoba) Mike McEwen	5
(Saskatchewan) Pat Simmons	7

==== C Event ====
Quarterfinals		Semifinals		C Qualifier
(Manitoba) Jason Gunnlaugson	5
(Saskatchewan) Joel Jordison	3	(Manitoba) Jason Gunnlaugson	9
(Manitoba) Kerry Burtnyk	6	(Manitoba) Kerry Burtnyk	7
(British Columbia) Greg McAulay	5			(Manitoba) Jason Gunnlaugson	8
				(Manitoba) Mike McEwen	7

Quarterfinals
(Newfoundland and Labrador) Brad Gushue	5
(Quebec) Jean-Michel Ménard	7

Semifinals
(Quebec) Jean-Michel Ménard	7
(Ontario) Wayne Middaugh	8
(British Columbia) Bob Ursel	6
(Alberta) Ted Appelman	5

C Qualifier
(Ontario) Wayne Middaugh	7
(British Columbia) Bob Ursel	4

=== Women's Tournament Brackets ===
==== A Event ====
Round of 16
(Alberta) Cathy King	9
(Ontario) Krista McCarville	6
(Alberta) Heather Rankin	5
(Saskatchewan) Sherry Anderson	8
(Ontario) Rachel Homan	8
(Quebec) Eve Bélisle	6
(Alberta) Crystal Webster	11
(Saskatchewan) Amber Holland	9

Quarterfinals
(Alberta) Cathy King	7
(British Columbia) Kelly Scott	8
(Saskatchewan) Sherry Anderson	8
(Saskatchewan) Michelle Englot	7
(Ontario) Rachel Homan	7
(Quebec) Marie-France Larouche	4
(Alberta) Crystal Webster	7
(Ontario) Sherry Middaugh	5

Semifinals
(British Columbia) Kelly Scott	9
(Saskatchewan) Sherry Anderson	8
(Ontario) Rachel Homan	6
(Alberta) Crystal Webster	8

A Qualifier
(British Columbia) Kelly Scott	7
(Alberta) Crystal Webster	8

==== B Event ====
Round of 16
(Ontario) Krista McCarville	6
(Alberta) Heather Rankin	5
(Quebec) Eve Bélisle	5
(Saskatchewan) Amber Holland	8
(Alberta) Cathy King	6
(Saskatchewan) Michelle Englot	5
(Quebec) Marie-France Larouche	8
(Ontario) Sherry Middaugh	5

Quarterfinals
(Ontario) Rachel Homan	7
(Ontario) Krista McCarville	8
(Saskatchewan) Sherry Anderson	6
(Saskatchewan) Amber Holland	8
(Alberta) Cathy King	4
(Quebec) Marie-France Larouche	10

Semifinals
(Ontario) Krista McCarville	6
(Saskatchewan) Amber Holland	3
(British Columbia) Kelly Scott	8
(Quebec) Marie-France Larouche	2

B Qualifier
(Ontario) Krista McCarville	6
(British Columbia) Kelly Scott	3

==== C Event ====
Quarterfinals		Semifinals		C Qualifier
(Alberta) Heather Rankin	7
(Quebec) Eve Belisle	3	(Alberta) Heather Rankin	4
(Saskatchewan) Michelle Englot	4	(Ontario) Sherry Middaugh	7
(Ontario) Sherry Middaugh	10			(Ontario) Sherry Middaugh	4
				(British Columbia) Kelly Scott	9

Quarterfinals
(Ontario) Rachel Homan	8
(Saskatchewan) Sherry Anderson	2

Semifinals
(Ontario) Rachel Homan	7
(Quebec) Marie-France Larouche	9
(Alberta) Cathy King	4
(Saskatchewan) Amber Holland	10

C Qualifier
(Quebec) Marie-France Larouche	3
(Saskatchewan) Amber Holland	7

== Olympic Trials ==
=== Qualified teams ===
==== Men's ====
Skip	Third/Vice skip	Second	Lead	Alternate	City	Criteria met
Kevin Martin	John Morris	Marc Kennedy	Ben Hebert	Adam Enright	Edmonton	Winners of 2006–07 Players' Championship, 2007–08 Canadian Men's Championship, 2007–08 World Championship
Glenn Howard	Richard Hart	Brent Laing	Craig Savill	Steve Bice	Coldwater	Winners of 2006–07 Canadian Men's Championship, 2006–07 World Championship, 2007–08 Players' Championship
Kevin Koe	Blake MacDonald	Carter Rycroft	Nolan Thiessen	Jamie King	Edmonton	Highest three-season CTRS point total from 2006–07 to 2008–09 of teams not already qualified Qualified for pool of sixteen with highest CTRS point total in 2006–07 season of teams not already qualified
Randy Ferbey	David Nedohin	Scott Pfeifer	Marcel Rocque	Dan Holowaychuk	Edmonton	Highest two-season CTRS point total from 2007–08 to 2008-09 of teams not already qualified

==== Women's ====
Skip	Third	Second	Lead	Alternate	City	Criteria met
Jennifer Jones	Cathy Overton-Clapham	Jill Officer	Dawn Askin	Jennifer Clark-Rouire	Winnipeg	Winners of 2006–07 Players' Championship, 2006–07 Canada Cup, 2007–08 Canadian Women's Championship
Shannon Kleibrink	Amy Nixon	Bronwen Webster	Chelsey Bell	Heather Nedohin	Calgary	Highest three-season CTRS point total from 2006–07 to 2008–09 of teams not already qualified Qualified for pool of sixteen as winner of 2008–09 Canada Cup
Cheryl Bernard	Susan O'Connor	Carolyn Darbyshire	Cori Bartel	Kristie Moore	Calgary	Highest two-season CTRS points total from 2007–08 to 2008-09 of teams not already qualified
Stefanie Lawton	Marliese Kasner	Sherri Singler	Lana Vey	Beth Iskiw	Saskatoon	Highest two-season CTRS points total from 2007–08 to 2008-09 of teams not already qualified Qualified for pool of sixteen as winner of 2007–08 Canada Cup

=== Men's tournament ===
==== Standings ====
Province	Skip	W	L	PF	PA	Ends Won	Ends Lost	Blank Ends	Stolen Ends	Shot Pct.
Alberta	Kevin Martin	6	1	52	38	32	27	5	7	87
Ontario	Glenn Howard	6	1	45	37	33	26	5	7	88
Manitoba	Jeff Stoughton	5	2	46	40	29	26	8	6	86
Alberta	Kevin Koe	4	3	53	36	31	26	2	6	88
Alberta	Randy Ferbey	3	4	47	50	26	30	4	3	86
Ontario	Wayne Middaugh	2	5	43	49	30	32	2	8	85
Saskatchewan	Pat Simmons	2	5	39	46	28	29	1	6	84
Manitoba	Jason Gunnlaugson	0	7	25	52	19	32	6	3	82

==== Draw 1 ====
December 6, 6:00pm

Sheet A	1	2	3	4	5	6	7	8	9	10	Final
(Ontario) Glenn Howard 🔨	1	0	1	0	0	0	2	0	0	1	5
(Manitoba) Jeff Stoughton	0	1	0	0	3	0	0	0	0	0	4

Sheet B	1	2	3	4	5	6	7	8	9	10	Final
(Alberta) Kevin Martin	1	0	0	0	2	0	2	1	0	1	7
(Manitoba) Jason Gunnlaugson 🔨	0	1	2	0	0	1	0	0	1	0	5

Sheet C	1	2	3	4	5	6	7	8	9	10	Final
(Alberta) Kevin Koe 🔨	3	0	1	0	2	0	0	2	0	X	8
(Saskatchewan) Pat Simmons	0	1	0	2	0	1	0	0	1	X	5

Sheet D	1	2	3	4	5	6	7	8	9	10	Final
(Ontario) Wayne Middaugh	0	1	0	2	0	0	2	0	1	1	7
(Alberta) Randy Ferbey 🔨	2	0	3	0	3	0	0	1	0	0	9

==== Draw 2 ====
December 7, 1:00pm

Sheet A	1	2	3	4	5	6	7	8	9	10	Final
(Manitoba) Jason Gunnlaugson	0	0	0	0	0	2	0	0	x	x	2
(Alberta) Kevin Koe	1	0	0	1	1	0	2	2	x	x	7

Sheet B	1	2	3	4	5	6	7	8	9	10	Final
(Ontario) Glenn Howard	1	0	1	0	1	0	2	0	0	1	6
(Ontario) Wayne Middaugh	0	1	0	1	0	1	0	1	1	0	5

Sheet C	1	2	3	4	5	6	7	8	9	10	Final
(Alberta) Randy Ferbey	0	1	0	2	0	0	0	2	0	x	5
(Manitoba) Jeff Stoughton	2	0	2	0	3	1	0	0	1	x	9

Sheet D	1	2	3	4	5	6	7	8	9	10	Final
(Saskatchewan) Pat Simmons	0	0	2	0	1	1	1	0	1	2	8
(Alberta) Kevin Martin	0	1	0	1	0	0	0	3	0	0	5

==== Draw 3 ====
December 8, 8:30am

Sheet A	1	2	3	4	5	6	7	8	9	10	Final
(Alberta) Kevin Martin 🔨	0	1	2	0	1	1	0	2	X	X	7
(Ontario) Wayne Middaugh	1	0	0	1	0	0	1	0	X	X	3

Sheet B	1	2	3	4	5	6	7	8	9	10	Final
(Saskatchewan) Pat Simmons	0	1	0	2	0	0	0	1	0	X	4
(Alberta) Randy Ferbey 🔨	1	0	3	0	1	0	1	0	3	X	9

Sheet C	1	2	3	4	5	6	7	8	9	10	Final
(Manitoba) Jason Gunnlaugson	0	1	0	0	0	0	1	0	2	X	4
(Ontario) Glenn Howard 🔨	2	0	0	0	2	1	0	1	0	X	6

Sheet D	1	2	3	4	5	6	7	8	9	10	Final
(Alberta) Kevin Koe	0	1	0	2	0	1	0	0	1	0	5
(Manitoba) Jeff Stoughton 🔨	1	0	2	0	1	0	0	2	0	0	6

==== Draw 4 ====
December 8, 6:00pm

Sheet A	1	2	3	4	5	6	7	8	9	10	Final
(Alberta) Randy Ferbey	0	0	2	0	0	1	1	0	5	X	9
(Manitoba) Jason Gunnlaugson 🔨	2	1	0	0	0	0	0	1	0	X	4

Sheet B	1	2	3	4	5	6	7	8	9	10	Final
(Manitoba) Jeff Stoughton 🔨	0	0	2	0	0	2	0	0	0	X	4
(Alberta) Kevin Martin	0	0	0	3	1	0	0	3	1	X	8

Sheet C	1	2	3	4	5	6	7	8	9	10	Final
(Ontario) Wayne Middaugh	0	1	0	1	0	0	2	0	X	X	4
(Alberta) Kevin Koe 🔨	2	0	3	0	1	1	0	4	X	X	11

Sheet D	1	2	3	4	5	6	7	8	9	10	Final
(Ontario) Glenn Howard 🔨	2	0	2	0	0	1	1	0	1	X	7
(Saskatchewan) Pat Simmons	0	1	0	1	0	0	0	2	0	X	4

==== Draw 5 ====
December 9, 1:00pm

Sheet A	1	2	3	4	5	6	7	8	9	10	Final
(Ontario) Wayne Middaugh 🔨	2	1	1	0	0	1	0	2	0	X	7
(Saskatchewan) Pat Simmons	0	0	0	1	1	0	1	0	2	X	5

Sheet B	1	2	3	4	5	6	7	8	9	10	11	Final
(Alberta) Kevin Koe 🔨	0	0	1	0	2	0	1	0	0	2	0	6
(Ontario) Glenn Howard	0	1	0	2	0	1	0	1	1	0	1	7

Sheet C	1	2	3	4	5	6	7	8	9	10	Final
(Alberta) Kevin Martin 🔨	0	3	0	2	0	0	2	0	2	X	9
(Alberta) Randy Ferbey	0	0	1	0	1	1	0	2	0	X	5

Sheet D	1	2	3	4	5	6	7	8	9	10	Final
(Manitoba) Jeff Stoughton 🔨	0	1	2	3	0	1	0	1	X	X	8
(Manitoba) Jason Gunnlaugson	1	0	0	0	1	0	2	0	X	X	4

==== Draw 6 ====
December 10, 8:30am

Sheet A	1	2	3	4	5	6	7	8	9	10	11	Final
(Alberta) Kevin Koe	0	3	0	0	0	1	0	1	0	2	0	7
(Alberta) Kevin Martin 🔨	1	0	0	1	2	0	2	0	1	0	1	8

Sheet B	1	2	3	4	5	6	7	8	9	10	Final
(Manitoba) Jason Gunnlaugson	0	1	0	0	0	0	0	1	X	X	2
(Saskatchewan) Pat Simmons 🔨	2	0	1	2	0	1	0	0	X	X	6

Sheet C	1	2	3	4	5	6	7	8	9	10	11	Final
(Manitoba) Jeff Stoughton 🔨	0	1	0	0	2	1	0	0	1	1	1	7
(Ontario) Wayne Middaugh	1	0	2	2	0	0	0	1	0	0	0	6

Sheet D	1	2	3	4	5	6	7	8	9	10	Final
(Alberta) Randy Ferbey 🔨	2	0	0	2	0	0	1	0	0	1	6
(Ontario) Glenn Howard	0	2	0	0	1	1	0	2	2	0	8

==== Draw 7 ====
December 10, 6:00pm

Sheet A	1	2	3	4	5	6	7	8	9	10	Final
(Saskatchewan) Pat Simmons	0	1	0	2	0	2	0	0	2	0	7
(Manitoba) Jeff Stoughton 🔨	1	0	2	0	1	0	0	2	0	2	8

Sheet B	1	2	3	4	5	6	7	8	9	10	Final
(Alberta) Randy Ferbey	0	0	2	0	2	0	0	0	X	X	4
(Alberta) Kevin Koe 🔨	2	2	0	2	0	2	0	1	X	X	9

Sheet C	1	2	3	4	5	6	7	8	9	10	Final
(Ontario) Glenn Howard	0	1	0	3	0	1	0	1	0	X	6
(Alberta) Kevin Martin 🔨	1	0	1	0	2	0	1	0	3	X	8

Sheet D	1	2	3	4	5	6	7	8	9	10	Final
(Manitoba) Jason Gunnlaugson	0	2	0	1	0	1	0	0	X	X	4
(Ontario) Wayne Middaugh 🔨	1	0	2	0	3	0	2	1	X	X	9

==== Semifinal ====
December 12, 1:00pm

Sheet B	1	2	3	4	5	6	7	8	9	10	Final
(Ontario) Glenn Howard 🔨	2	0	2	0	0	2	0	1	0	4	11
(Manitoba) Jeff Stoughton	0	1	0	1	0	0	2	0	2	0	6

==== Final ====
December 13, 1:00pm

Sheet B	1	2	3	4	5	6	7	8	9	10	Final
(Alberta) Kevin Martin 🔨	0	2	1	0	2	0	0	1	1	X	7
(Ontario) Glenn Howard	0	0	0	1	0	0	2	0	0	X	3

=== Women's tournament ===
==== Standings ====
Province	Skip	W	L	PF	PA	Ends Won	Ends Lost	Blank Ends	Stolen Ends	Shot Pct.
Alberta	Cheryl Bernard	6	1	56	41	32	29	6	6	80
Alberta	Shannon Kleibrink	5	2	49	43	27	30	8	5	82
Ontario	Krista McCarville	4	3	44	39	29	24	2	7	78
Saskatchewan	Amber Holland	4	3	40	42	29	29	6	6	80
Saskatchewan	Stefanie Lawton	4	3	46	40	31	27	4	8	80
Manitoba	Jennifer Jones	2	5	45	53	29	29	3	4	80
Alberta	Crystal Webster	2	5	48	43	32	30	4	8	81
British Columbia	Kelly Scott	1	6	38	65	22	33	1	2	77

==== Draw 1 ====
December 6, 1:00pm

Sheet A	1	2	3	4	5	6	7	8	9	10	Final
(Alberta) Shannon Kleibrink	0	1	0	0	0	0	0	2	0	0	3
(Alberta) Crystal Webster 🔨	1	0	1	0	1	0	1	0	1	3	8

Sheet B	1	2	3	4	5	6	7	8	9	10	Final
(Manitoba) Jennifer Jones 🔨	1	0	0	0	2	0	0	2	0	X	5
(Saskatchewan) Amber Holland	0	2	1	1	0	0	2	0	2	X	8

Sheet C	1	2	3	4	5	6	7	8	9	10	Final
(Alberta) Cheryl Bernard 🔨	0	1	0	2	0	1	0	2	0	5	11
(Ontario) Krista McCarville	0	0	2	0	1	0	3	0	1	0	7

Sheet D	1	2	3	4	5	6	7	8	9	10	Final
(British Columbia) Kelly Scott	0	1	0	2	0	2	0	3	0	0	8
(Saskatchewan) Stefanie Lawton 🔨	2	0	0	0	1	0	1	0	2	1	7

==== Draw 2 ====
December 7, 8:30am

Sheet A	1	2	3	4	5	6	7	8	9	10	Final
(Saskatchewan) Amber Holland	1	0	1	0	0	0	1	1	1	0	5
(Alberta) Cheryl Bernard	0	2	0	1	1	1	0	0	0	1	6

Sheet B	1	2	3	4	5	6	7	8	9	10	Final
(Alberta) Shannon Kleibrink	0	3	0	0	3	0	2	1	0	X	9
(British Columbia) Kelly Scott	0	0	0	3	0	1	0	0	2	X	6

Sheet C	1	2	3	4	5	6	7	8	9	10	Final
(Saskatchewan) Stefanie Lawton	3	0	2	0	0	1	0	1	1	0	8
(Alberta) Crystal Webster	0	2	0	0	2	0	1	0	0	2	7

Sheet D	1	2	3	4	5	6	7	8	9	10	Final
(Ontario) Krista McCarville	0	2	1	0	4	0	0	2	X	X	9
(Manitoba) Jennifer Jones	1	0	0	1	0	0	1	0	X	X	3

==== Draw 3 ====
December 7, 6:00pm

Sheet A	1	2	3	4	5	6	7	8	9	10	Final
(Manitoba) Jennifer Jones 🔨	1	1	0	3	0	1	0	5	X	X	11
(British Columbia) Kelly Scott	0	0	1	0	2	0	2	0	X	X	5

Sheet B	1	2	3	4	5	6	7	8	9	10	Final
(Ontario) Krista McCarville	0	0	1	0	0	1	2	0	0	2	6
(Saskatchewan) Stefanie Lawton 🔨	1	0	0	0	2	0	0	1	1	0	5

Sheet C	1	2	3	4	5	6	7	8	9	10	Final
(Saskatchewan) Amber Holland	0	0	1	0	1	0	1	0	0	X	3
(Alberta) Shannon Kleibrink 🔨	1	1	0	2	0	0	0	2	3	X	9

Sheet D	1	2	3	4	5	6	7	8	9	10	Final
(Alberta) Cheryl Bernard 🔨	2	2	0	2	1	0	0	1	0	1	9
(Alberta) Crystal Webster	0	0	1	0	0	2	1	0	2	0	6

==== Draw 4 ====
December 8, 1:00pm

Sheet A	1	2	3	4	5	6	7	8	9	10	Final
(Saskatchewan) Stefanie Lawton	0	1	0	1	4	1	0	3	X	X	10
(Saskatchewan) Amber Holland 🔨	2	0	1	0	0	0	1	0	X	X	4

Sheet B	1	2	3	4	5	6	7	8	9	10	Final
(Alberta) Crystal Webster 🔨	0	2	0	2	0	1	0	1	0	1	7
(Manitoba) Jennifer Jones	0	0	3	0	2	0	2	0	1	0	8

Sheet C	1	2	3	4	5	6	7	8	9	10	Final
(British Columbia) Kelly Scott	0	0	1	0	2	0	3	0	1	0	7
(Alberta) Cheryl Bernard 🔨	0	2	0	1	0	1	0	1	0	4	9

Sheet D	1	2	3	4	5	6	7	8	9	10	Final
(Alberta) Shannon Kleibrink 🔨	0	3	0	0	1	0	0	3	0	X	7
(Ontario) Krista McCarville	0	0	1	0	0	1	1	0	1	X	4

==== Draw 5 ====
December 9, 8:30am

Sheet A	1	2	3	4	5	6	7	8	9	10	Final
(British Columbia) Kelly Scott	0	0	3	0	0	0	0	2	X	X	5
(Ontario) Krista McCarville 🔨	2	2	0	0	2	2	1	0	X	X	9

Sheet B	1	2	3	4	5	6	7	8	9	10	Final
(Alberta) Cheryl Bernard	0	0	0	2	0	1	0	2	0	3	8
(Alberta) Shannon Kleibrink 🔨	2	1	0	0	1	0	0	0	1	0	5

Sheet C	1	2	3	4	5	6	7	8	9	10	Final
(Manitoba) Jennifer Jones 🔨	1	0	0	0	1	1	0	0	0	1	4
(Saskatchewan) Stefanie Lawton	0	2	2	0	0	0	1	0	1	0	6

Sheet D	1	2	3	4	5	6	7	8	9	10	11	Final
(Alberta) Crystal Webster	0	0	1	0	0	1	1	1	0	1	0	5
(Saskatchewan) Amber Holland 🔨	0	1	0	1	1	0	0	0	2	0	1	6

==== Draw 6 ====
December 9, 7:30pm

Sheet A	1	2	3	4	5	6	7	8	9	10	Final
(Alberta) Cheryl Bernard	0	0	0	4	0	1	0	3	0	X	8
(Manitoba) Jennifer Jones 🔨	1	0	0	0	2	0	1	0	1	X	5

Sheet B	1	2	3	4	5	6	7	8	9	10	Final
(Saskatchewan) Amber Holland 🔨	1	0	0	0	0	1	0	0	0	2	4
(Ontario) Krista McCarville	0	1	0	0	0	0	1	1	0	0	3

Sheet C	1	2	3	4	5	6	7	8	9	10	Final
(Alberta) Crystal Webster 🔨	0	3	0	0	2	0	4	2	X	X	11
(British Columbia) Kelly Scott	0	0	1	1	0	1	0	0	X	X	3

Sheet D	1	2	3	4	5	6	7	8	9	10	Final
(Saskatchewan) Stefanie Lawton	0	1	0	0	1	0	1	0	2	X	5
(Alberta) Shannon Kleibrink 🔨	0	0	2	1	0	2	0	1	0	X	6

==== Draw 7 ====
December 10, 1:00pm

Sheet A	1	2	3	4	5	6	7	8	9	10	Final
(Ontario) Krista McCarville 🔨	1	0	1	0	2	0	0	1	0	1	6
(Alberta) Crystal Webster	0	1	0	1	0	0	1	0	1	0	4

Sheet B	1	2	3	4	5	6	7	8	9	10	Final
(Saskatchewan) Stefanie Lawton 🔨	1	0	0	0	1	0	2	0	0	2	6
(Alberta) Cheryl Bernard	0	0	2	1	0	1	0	1	0	0	5

Sheet C	1	2	3	4	5	6	7	8	9	10	11	Final
(Alberta) Shannon Kleibrink 🔨	0	2	0	2	0	4	0	0	1	0	1	10
(Manitoba) Jennifer Jones	1	0	2	0	1	0	2	1	0	2	0	9

Sheet D	1	2	3	4	5	6	7	8	9	10	Final
(Saskatchewan) Amber Holland 🔨	3	0	2	0	1	0	3	1	X	X	10
(British Columbia) Kelly Scott	0	1	0	2	0	1	0	0	X	X	4

==== Tiebreaker 1 ====
December 11, 8:30am

Sheet B	1	2	3	4	5	6	7	8	9	10	Final
(Ontario) Krista McCarville	0	1	0	0	4	0	1	0	1	X	7
(Saskatchewan) Stefanie Lawton 🔨	1	0	0	1	0	1	0	1	0	X	4

==== Tiebreaker 2 ====
December 11, 1:00pm

Sheet B	1	2	3	4	5	6	7	8	9	10	11	Final
(Saskatchewan) Amber Holland 🔨	0	0	1	0	1	0	1	0	2	1	0	6
(Ontario) Krista McCarville	0	0	0	1	0	4	0	1	0	0	1	7

==== Semifinal ====
December 11, 6:00pm

Sheet B	1	2	3	4	5	6	7	8	9	10	Final
(Alberta) Shannon Kleibrink 🔨	1	2	0	0	1	1	0	5	X	X	10
(Ontario) Krista McCarville	0	0	1	1	0	0	3	0	X	X	5

==== Final ====
December 12, 6:00pm

Sheet B	1	2	3	4	5	6	7	8	9	10	Final
(Alberta) Cheryl Bernard 🔨	1	1	0	1	0	1	0	2	0	1	7
(Alberta) Shannon Kleibrink	0	0	1	0	1	0	3	0	1	0	6
