= 2016 Continental Cup of Curling =

2016 World Financial Group Continental Cup of Curling
- Host city: Paradise, Nevada
- Arena: Orleans Arena
- Dates: January 14–17
- Winner: Team North America
Score Breakdown
Discipline	NA	World
Team Round 1	1.5	1.5
Mixed Doubles Round 1	1.5	1.5
Team Round 2	1	2
Team Round 3	3	0
Mixed Doubles Round 2	1	2
Team Round 4	0	3
Mixed Doubles Round 3	2	4
Team Round 5	2.5	0.5
Team Round 6	2	1
Skins Round 1	8	7
Skins Round 2	8	7
Total	30.5	29.5

The 2016 World Financial Group Continental Cup of Curling was held from January 14 to 17 at the Orleans Arena in Paradise, Nevada. This marked the second edition of the Continental Cup to be held outside of Canada. The Continental Cup featured team events, mixed doubles events, and skins competitions, with most points available in the skins competitions. TSN broadcast the event, as it had in previous years.

The total attendance for the event was 62,498, the highest in Cup history (as of 2017). Team North America collected CAD$52,000 winners cheque and CAD$13,000 skins bonus. Team World collected CAD$26,000 losers cheque.

== Competition format ==
This edition of the Continental Cup used a similar format as that of the previous year, with the main difference being the elimination of the singles event, which was replaced by an additional mixed doubles event. Out of the sixty total points available, a majority of points were needed to win the cup. The mixed doubles, and team games were worth one point each, with ties being worth one half point each to both teams. The skins games were worth a total of five points. Six mixed doubles and six singles games were played, along with eighteen team games and six skins games.

== Teams ==
The teams were selected from the top teams in each region. Six teams from each region competed against each other in the competition. Four teams from Canada earned the right to represent Team North America by virtue of winning certain events, namely the Canada Cup of Curling and the Canadian National Championships (the Brier and the Tournament of Hearts). Two teams from the United States, namely the winners of the United States National Championships, were chosen to represent North America, and the teams representing Team World were selected by the World Curling Federation.

The teams in the table below were announced as representatives of their respective regions. For Team North America, the teams participating included Canada Cup champions Kevin Koe and Rachel Homan, Tournament of Hearts champion Jennifer Jones, Brier champion Pat Simmons, and United States national champions Erika Brown and John Shuster. For Team World, the teams participating include reigning women's world champion Alina Pätz, Olympic bronze medallist Eve Muirhead, two-time world champion Niklas Edin, Japanese women's national champion Ayumi Ogasawara, Chinese men's national champion Zang Jialiang, and world champion Thomas Ulsrud.

Team	Skip	Third	Second	Lead	Locale
Team; North; America	Erika Brown	Allison Pottinger	Nicole Joraanstad	Natalie Nicholson	(United States) Madison, Wisconsin
Team; North; America	Jennifer Jones	Kaitlyn Lawes	Jill Officer	Dawn McEwen	(Canada) Winnipeg, Manitoba
Team; North; America	Rachel Homan	Emma Miskew	Joanne Courtney	Lisa Weagle	(Canada) Ottawa, Ontario
Team; North; America	Kevin Koe	Marc Kennedy	Brent Laing	Ben Hebert	(Canada) Calgary, Alberta
Team; North; America	Pat Simmons	John Morris	Carter Rycroft	Nolan Thiessen	(Canada) Calgary, Alberta
Team; North; America	John Shuster	Tyler George	Matt Hamilton	John Landsteiner	(United States) Duluth, Minnesota
Team; North; America	Coach: (Canada) Rick Lang, Captain: (United States) Ann Swisshelm				
Team; World	Alina Pätz	Nadine Lehmann	Marisa Winkelhausen	Nicole Schwägli	(Switzerland) Baden
Team; World	Eve Muirhead	Anna Sloan	Vicki Adams	Sarah Reid	(Scotland) Stirling
Team; World	Niklas Edin	Oskar Eriksson	Kristian Lindström	Christoffer Sundgren	(Sweden) Karlstad
Team; World	Ayumi Ogasawara	Sayaka Yoshimura	Kaho Onodera	Anna Ohmiya	(Japan) Sapporo
Team; World	Thomas Ulsrud	Torger Nergård	Christoffer Svae	Håvard Vad Petersson	(Norway) Oslo
Team; World	Zang Jialiang	Xu Xiaoming	Ba Dexin	Wang Jinbo	(China) Harbin
Team; World	Coach: (Norway) Pål Trulsen, Captain: (Germany) Andy Kapp				

== Events ==
All times listed are in Pacific Standard Time (UTC−8). The draws for Thursday, Friday, and Saturday were released on Wednesday night, and the draws for Sunday will be released on Saturday afternoon.

=== Thursday, January 14 ===
==== Draw 1 ====
Team 8:30 am

Sheet A	1	2	3	4	5	6	7	8	Final	Points
North America (Homan)	0	0	0	3	0	0	5	0	8	½
World (Muirhead) 🔨	1	2	1	0	1	1	0	2	8	½

Sheet B	1	2	3	4	5	6	7	8	Final	Points
North America (Koe)	0	3	0	5	0	1	0	X	9	1
World (Ulsrud) 🔨	1	0	1	0	1	0	2	X	5	0

Sheet C	1	2	3	4	5	6	7	8	Final	Points
North America (Brown)	0	0	0	1	0	1	0	X	2	0
World (Pätz) 🔨	0	3	2	0	2	0	1	X	8	1

==== Draw 2 ====
Mixed doubles 1:00 pm

Sheet A	1	2	3	4	5	6	7	8	Final	Points
North America (Hebert/Miskew)	0	0	2	0	1	0	3	0	6	0
World (Ulsrud/Adams)	1	1	0	1	0	4	0	1	8	1

Sheet B	1	2	3	4	5	6	7	8	Final	Points
North America (Kennedy/Lawes)	1	0	1	1	0	0	3	0	6	½
World (Nergård/Muirhead)	0	1	0	0	1	1	0	3	6	½

Sheet C	1	2	3	4	5	6	7	8	Final	Points
North America (Rycroft/Brown)	3	0	0	2	0	2	2	0	9	1
World (Svae/Sloan)	0	1	1	0	2	0	0	2	6	0

==== Draw 3 ====
Team 6:30 pm

Sheet A	1	2	3	4	5	6	7	8	Final	Points
North America (Simmons) 🔨	1	0	0	0	2	0	2	1	6	0
World (Zang)	0	0	2	4	0	1	0	0	7	1

Sheet B	1	2	3	4	5	6	7	8	Final	Points
North America (Jones)	2	0	2	2	1	0	1	X	8	1
World (Ogasawara) 🔨	0	2	0	0	0	1	0	X	3	0

Sheet C	1	2	3	4	5	6	7	8	Final	Points
North America (Shuster) 🔨	1	0	2	1	0	0	1	0	5	0
World (Edin)	0	2	0	0	2	2	0	1	7	1

=== Friday, January 15 ===
==== Draw 4 ====
Team 8:30 am

Sheet A	1	2	3	4	5	6	7	8	Final	Points
North America (Jones)	1	0	1	3	0	0	1	X	6	1
World (Pätz) 🔨	0	0	0	0	2	1	0	X	3	0

Sheet B	1	2	3	4	5	6	7	8	Final	Points
North America (Shuster)	0	1	0	1	0	3	0	1	6	1
World (Zang) 🔨	0	0	1	0	1	0	3	0	5	0

Sheet C	1	2	3	4	5	6	7	8	Final	Points
North America (Homan) 🔨	0	2	1	0	2	1	1	X	7	1
World (Ogasawara)	0	0	0	1	0	0	0	X	1	0

==== Draw 5 ====
Mixed doubles 1:00 pm

Sheet A	1	2	3	4	5	6	7	8	Final	Points
North America (Laing/Jones)	1	0	0	3	2	1	0	0	7	0
World (Sundgren/Pätz)	0	3	2	0	0	0	3	1	9	1

Sheet B	1	2	3	4	5	6	7	8	Final	Points
North America (George/Nicholson)	0	1	1	0	0	0	0	X	2	0
World (Xu/Winkelhausen)	2	0	0	1	1	2	2	X	8	1

Sheet C	1	2	3	4	5	6	7	8	Final	Points
North America (Morris/Homan)	2	0	4	2	1	0	1	0	10	1
World (Eriksson/Yoshimura)	0	1	0	0	0	4	0	1	6	0

==== Draw 6 ====
Team 6:30 pm

Sheet A	1	2	3	4	5	6	7	8	Final	Points
North America (Koe)	0	1	0	0	1	0	1	0	3	0
World (Edin) 🔨	1	0	0	2	0	0	0	1	4	1

Sheet B	1	2	3	4	5	6	7	8	Final	Points
North America (Brown)	0	0	0	1	0	0	1	X	2	0
World (Muirhead) 🔨	1	0	2	0	2	1	0	X	6	1

Sheet C	1	2	3	4	5	6	7	8	Final	Points
North America (Simmons)	0	0	0	2	0	2	0	1	5	0
World (Ulsrud) 🔨	0	4	0	0	2	0	1	0	7	1

=== Saturday, January 16 ===
==== Draw 7 ====
Mixed doubles 9:00 am

After the first four ends, the players on each team were replaced with new players.

Sheet A	1	2	3	4	5	6	7	8	Final	Points
North America (Weagle/Thiessen/Courtney/Koe)	0	2	0	0	0	1	1	X	4	0
World (Petersson/Reid/Ohmiya/Edin)	2	0	1	1	4	0	0	X	8	2

Sheet B	1	2	3	4	5	6	7	8	Final	Points
North America (Shuster/McEwen/Officer/Hamilton)	0	1	0	1	2	0	1	1	6	2
World (Lindström/Lehmann/Schwägli/Zang)	2	0	1	0	0	2	0	0	5	0

Sheet C	1	2	3	4	5	6	7	8	Final	Points
North America (Simmons/Joraanstad/Pottinger/Landsteiner)	0	0	1	0	0	2	0	X	3	0
World (Ba/Onodera/Ogasawara/Wang)	1	1	0	1	1	0	5	X	9	2

==== Draw 8 ====
Team 1:00 pm

Sheet A	1	2	3	4	5	6	7	8	Final	Points
North America (Brown) 🔨	0	1	1	3	0	1	1	X	7	1
World (Ogasawara)	1	0	0	0	1	0	0	X	2	0

Sheet B	1	2	3	4	5	6	7	8	Final	Points
North America (Simmons)	0	0	1	0	0	2	1	0	4	½
World (Edin) 🔨	0	2	0	0	1	0	0	1	4	½

Sheet C	1	2	3	4	5	6	7	8	Final	Points
North America (Jones) 🔨	0	2	0	0	2	0	1	1	6	1
World (Muirhead)	2	0	0	2	0	1	0	0	5	0

==== Draw 9 ====
Team 6:30 pm

Sheet A	1	2	3	4	5	6	7	8	Final	Points
North America (Shuster) 🔨	0	0	0	0	2	1	0	0	3	0
World (Ulsrud)	0	1	1	0	0	0	1	2	5	1

Sheet B	1	2	3	4	5	6	7	8	Final	Points
North America (Homan)	0	1	0	1	0	2	0	1	5	1
World (Pätz)	0	0	1	0	1	0	1	0	3	0

Sheet C	1	2	3	4	5	6	7	8	Final	Points
North America (Koe)	1	3	1	0	0	2	0	X	7	1
World (Zang) 🔨	0	0	0	0	1	0	1	X	2	0

=== Sunday, January 17 ===
==== Draw 10 ====
Skins 1:00 pm

Values (points)	½	½	½	½	½	½	1	1		5
Sheet A	1	2	3	4	5	6	7	8	Button	Total
North America (Shuster)		X	X	X		X		0		3
World (Zang) 🔨	0				0		0		X	2

Values (points)	½	½	½	½	½	½	1	1		5
Sheet B	1	2	3	4	5	6	7	8	Button	Total
North America (Simmons/Lawes/Rycroft/Officer)	X	X		X	X	X		0		2½
World (Ulsrud/Pätz/Svae/Schwägli) 🔨			X				X		X	2½

Values (points)	½	½	½	½	½	½	1	1	5
Sheet C	1	2	3	4	5	6	7	8	Total
North America (Brown)	X		0		0		X	X	2½
World (Ogasawara) 🔨		0		X		X			2½

==== Draw 11 ====
Skins 6:30 pm

Values (points)	½	½	½	½	½	½	1	1		5
Sheet A	1	2	3	4	5	6	7	8	Button	Total
North America (Koe)			X	X		0		0		1
World (Edin) 🔨	X	X			X		0		X	4

Values (points)	½	½	½	½	½	½	1	1	5
Sheet B	1	2	3	4	5	6	7	8	Total
North America (Morris/Pottinger/Thiessen/Nicholson)	X	X	X			X		X	3
World (Nergård/Lehmann/Petersson/Winkelhausen) 🔨				X	X		X		2

Values (points)	½	½	½	½	½	½	1	1	5
Sheet C	1	2	3	4	5	6	7	8	Total
North America (Jones) 🔨	0		0	X		0	X		4
World (Muirhead)		0			0			X	1
