= 2006 Players' Championship =

Grand Slam of Curling event

The 2006 Players' Championships Grand Slam of curling tournament, was held April 13–16 at the Stampede Corral in Calgary, Alberta. Following the merger of the World Curling Tour and the Women's World Curling Tour, it became the first Players' Championship to feature a women's event. It was the last event of the 2005-06 curling season. The men's event, sponsored by the Calgary Herald, featured a purse of $150,000, with the winning team receiving $50,000, while the women's event, called the BDO Classic Women's Players' Championship had a purse of $100,000 with the top team receiving $30,000.

The men's final was an all-Edmonton affair, with Randy Ferbey and his foursome defeating the rival Kevin Martin rink 8–5. It was Ferbey's first Players' title. The team had not played many Grand Slam events prior to the season, due to the prior conflict between the Tour and the Brier, which saw many of the top teams in the country boycott Canada's national men's championship. Ferbey, who was not part of the boycott had won four Briers during this period, but due to his lack of Tour success, his team had critics of their abilities. With the win, Ferbey said "the critics now can shove it you know where. There's not questioning anything now".

In the women's final, Jennifer Jones of Winnipeg defeated Cheryl Bernard of Calgary 10–8. The two finals were played at the same time in front of about 1,000 spectators.

The playoffs were shown television on Rogers Sportsnet.

== Format ==
For both the men's and women's events, there were 15 teams divided into three round-robin pools of five. The top two teams in each pool made the 8-team single-elimination playoff, plus two wild card teams.

== Men's ==
=== Round-robin standings ===
Key
| Teams to Playoffs |
| Teams to Tiebreakers |

| Kevin Albrecht Pool | W | L |
|---|---|---|
| (Saskatchewan) Pat Simmons | 4 | 0 |
| (Manitoba) Jeff Stoughton | 2 | 2 |
| (United States) Pete Fenson | 2 | 2 |
| (Ontario) Wayne Middaugh | 1 | 3 |
| (Alberta) Mark Johnson | 1 | 3 |

| Warren Hansen Pool | W | L |
|---|---|---|
| (Ontario) Glenn Howard | 4 | 0 |
| (Scotland) Tom Brewster | 2 | 2 |
| (Alberta) Randy Ferbey | 2 | 2 |
| (British Columbia) Jim Cotter | 2 | 2 |
| (Nova Scotia) Mark Dacey | 0 | 4 |

| Bruce Saville Pool | W | L |
|---|---|---|
| (Alberta) John Morris | 3 | 1 |
| (Alberta) Kevin Martin | 3 | 1 |
| (Quebec) Pierre Charette | 2 | 2 |
| (Saskatchewan) Bruce Korte | 2 | 2 |
| (Newfoundland and Labrador) Brad Gushue | 0 | 4 |

Tie breakers

- (Alberta) Randy Ferbey 7-6 (British Columbia) Jim Cotter
- (Quebec) Pierre Charette 7-6 (Manitoba) Jeff Stoughton
- (United States) Pete Fenson 6-4 (Saskatchewan) Bruce Korte

=== Playoffs ===
Quarterfinals
1 | (Ontario) Glenn Howard | 8
8 | (Quebec) Pierre Charette | 9
4 | (Alberta) Kevin Martin | 6
5 | (Scotland) Tom Brewster | 3
2 | (Saskatchewan) Pat Simmons | 7
7 | (United States) Pete Fenson | 6
3 | (Alberta) John Morris | 5
6 | (Alberta) Randy Ferbey | 6

Semifinals
8 | (Quebec) Pierre Charette | 5
4 | (Alberta) Kevin Martin | 7
2 | (Saskatchewan) Pat Simmons | 7
6 | (Alberta) Randy Ferbey | 8

Final
4 | (Alberta) Kevin Martin | 5
6 | (Alberta) Randy Ferbey | 8

Final

| Team | 1 | 2 | 3 | 4 | 5 | 6 | 7 | 8 | 9 | 10 | Final |
|---|---|---|---|---|---|---|---|---|---|---|---|
| (Alberta) Randy Ferbey | 0 | 1 | 0 | 2 | 2 | 0 | 0 | 2 | 1 | X | 8 |
| (Alberta) Kevin Martin | 2 | 0 | 1 | 0 | 0 | 1 | 1 | 0 | 0 | X | 5 |

== Women's ==
=== Round-robin standings ===
Key
| Teams to Playoffs |
| Teams to Tiebreakers |

| Anne Merklinger Pool | W | L |
|---|---|---|
| (Manitoba) Jennifer Jones | 3 | 1 |
| (Alberta) Heather Rankin | 2 | 2 |
| (Manitoba) Janet Harvey | 2 | 2 |
| (Ontario) Anne Merklinger | 2 | 2 |
| (Saskatchewan) Sherry Anderson | 1 | 3 |

| Robin Wilson Pool | W | L |
|---|---|---|
| (Alberta) Shannon Kleibrink | 3 | 1 |
| (Alberta) Renee Sonnenberg | 2 | 2 |
| (British Columbia) Kelly Scott | 2 | 2 |
| (Alberta) Cathy King | 2 | 2 |
| (Ontario) Jenn Hanna | 1 | 3 |

| Marilyn Bodogh Pool | W | L |
|---|---|---|
| (Saskatchewan) Jan Betker | 3 | 1 |
| (Alberta) Cheryl Bernard | 3 | 1 |
| (Saskatchewan) Amber Holland | 2 | 2 |
| (United States) Debbie McCormick | 2 | 2 |
| (Switzerland) Mirjam Ott | 0 | 4 |

Tie breakers

- (British Columbia) Kelly Scott 6-2 (Manitoba) Janet Harvey
- (Alberta) Renee Sonnenberg 7-6 (Saskatchewan) Amber Holland
- (Alberta) Cathy King 9-4 (Alberta) Heather Rankin
- (United States) Debbie McCormick 7-4 (Ontario) Anne Merklinger

=== Playoffs ===
Quarterfinals
1 | (Saskatchewan) Jan Betker | 5
8 | (Alberta) Cathy King | 7
4 | (Manitoba) Jennifer Jones | 9
5 | (United States) Debbie McCormick | 5
2 | (Alberta) Shannon Kleibrink | 8
7 | (British Columbia) Kelly Scott | 2
3 | (Alberta) Cheryl Bernard | 6
6 | (Alberta) Renee Sonnenberg | 5

Semifinals
8 | (Alberta) Cathy King | 2
4 | (Manitoba) Jennifer Jones | 8
2 | (Alberta) Shannon Kleibrink | 6
3 | (Alberta) Cheryl Bernard | 8

Final
4 | (Manitoba) Jennifer Jones | 10
3 | (Alberta) Cheryl Bernard | 8

Final

| Team | 1 | 2 | 3 | 4 | 5 | 6 | 7 | 8 | 9 | 10 | 11 | Final |
|---|---|---|---|---|---|---|---|---|---|---|---|---|
| (Alberta) Cheryl Bernard | 0 | 3 | 0 | 2 | 0 | 0 | 0 | 1 | 0 | 2 | 0 | 8 |
| (Manitoba) Jennifer Jones | 2 | 0 | 1 | 0 | 2 | 1 | 0 | 0 | 2 | 0 | 2 | 10 |
