= 2009 Casino Rama Curling Skins Game =

The 2009 Casino Rama Curling Skins Game on TSN was held on January 10 and 11 at the Casino Rama Entertainment Centre in Rama, Ontario. The total purse for the event was CAD$ 100,000.

Four teams were invited to participate. They played one semi-final each on January 10, and the winners played in the final on January 11.

For the first time ever, a women's team participated in this event. World Women's Champion Jennifer Jones and her team were invited. They joined defending men's world champion, Kevin Martin, four time world champion Randy Ferbey and 2007 World Champion Glenn Howard.

== Teams ==
=== Team Ferbey ===
Granite Curling Club, Edmonton, Alberta

- Fourth: David Nedohin
- Skip: Randy Ferbey
- Second: Scott Pfeifer
- Lead: Marcel Rocque

=== Team Howard ===
Coldwater and District Curling Club, Coldwater, Ontario

- Skip: Glenn Howard
- Third: Richard Hart
- Second: Brent Laing
- Lead: Craig Savill

=== Team Jones ===
St. Vital Curling Club, Winnipeg, Manitoba

- Skip: Jennifer Jones
- Third: Cathy Overton-Clapham
- Second: Jill Officer
- Lead: Dawn Askin

=== Team Martin ===
Saville Sports Centre, Edmonton, Alberta

- Skip: Kevin Martin
- Third: John Morris
- Second: Marc Kennedy
- Lead: Ben Hebert

== Draw to the button ==
Team Howard won the draw to the button contest to determine seeding. This awarded them an extra $1000.

== Games ==
Semi-final dollar amounts

- 1st & 2nd end: $1000
- 3rd & 4th end: $1500
- 5th end: $2000
- 6th end: $3000
- 7th end: $4500
- 8th end: $6500

=== Ferbey vs. Martin ===
January 10, 1:00 p.m. EST

| Team | 1 | 2 | 3 | 4 | 5 | 6 | 7 | 8 | Final |
| Martin | - | $ | - | - | - | - | - | - | $1000 |
| Ferbey 🔨 | $ | - | - | - | $ | $ | - | $ | $20000 |

=== Jones vs. Howard ===
January 10, 7:00 p.m. EST

| Team | 1 | 2 | 3 | 4 | 5 | 6 | 7 | 8 | Final |
| Jones 🔨 | - | - | $ | - | - | - | - | - | $1500 |
| Howard | $ | $ | - | - | $ | $ | $ | $ | $19500 |

=== Final ===
January 11, 1:00 p.m. EST

Final game dollar amounts

- 1st & 2nd end: $2000
- 3rd & 4th end: $3000
- 5th end: $4000
- 6th end: $6000
- 7th end: $9000
- 8th end: $13000

+ $15000 bonus for the winner

| Team | 1 | 2 | 3 | 4 | 5 | 6 | 7 | 8 | Final |
| Howard | - | $ | - | $ | - | - | - | - | $7000 |
| Ferbey 🔨 | - | - | $ | - | $ | - | - | $ | $50000 |

| Preceded by 2007 | 2009 Casino Rama Curling Skins Game; January 10–11 | Succeeded by 2010 |
