= 2019 Continental Cup (curling) =

2019 World Financial Group Continental Cup
- Host city: Paradise, Nevada
- Arena: Orleans Arena
- Dates: January 17–20
- Winner: Team World
Score Breakdown
Discipline	NA	World
Draw 1 – Mixed doubles	0	3
Draw 2 – Mixed doubles	0	3
Draw 3 – Women's team play	0	3
Draw 4 – Mixed doubles	1	2
Draw 5 – Mixed Doubles	3	0
Draw 6 – Men's team play	0.5	2.5
Draw 7 – Women’s scramble	0.5	2.5
Draw 8 – Men’s scramble	1.5	1.5
Draw 9 – Mixed scramble	6	0
Draw 10 – Skins	3.5	11.5
Draw 11 – Skins	10	5
Total	26	34

The 2019 World Financial Group Continental Cup was held from January 17 to 20 at the Orleans Arena in Paradise, Nevada. This was the fourth time the event is being held in Paradise and the fourth time outside Canada. The event featured new team scramble competitions, with players from different traditional teams competing together, along with the mixed doubles, team, and skins competitions seen in previous years.

Team World was in the lead for the entirety of the event. However, a strong performance from Team North America in the final skins draw, holding Team World to 0.5 points in the first seven ends of all three matches, led to the winner being decided in the eighth and final end. The cup was decided in the women's game when Eve Muirhead made a hit and stick to win a skin worth 2.5 points against Team Rachel Homan to clinch the title.

The final result was a 34–26 victory for Team World, their first win since 2012. Team World collected CAD$85,000; Team North America collected CAD$45,000.

== Competition format ==
This edition of the Continental Cup will use a new format. There will be sixty points available, distributed as follows:

Event	Games	Points	Total points
Teams	6	1	6
Mixed doubles	12	1	12
Team scramble	6	1	6
Mixed team scramble	3	2	6
Skins	6	5	30
Total	33	N/A	60

The number of traditional team games is reduced under this format, with each team now playing in only one traditional team game instead of three as in past years. There is one additional mixed doubles draw, eliminating the practice of having the third mixed doubles game consisting of two pairs of players who switch after four ends of play; this in turn ensures that all players are involved in one full mixed doubles game.

The two new events are the team scramble and mixed team scramble. The team scramble will be a mix of the traditional teams into same-gender lineups. Front-end or back-end teammates cannot stay together, but a back-end player may play with a front-end teammate. The mixed teams scramble will use mixed teams, with at least one team per side skipped by a female. There is one men's team scramble draw and one women's team scramble draw, with each game worth one point; each game in the single mixed scramble draw is worth two points.

== Teams ==
Team	Skip	Third	Second	Lead	Country
Team; North; America	Brad Gushue	Mark Nichols	Brett Gallant	Geoff Walker	Canada
Team; North; America	Rachel Homan	Emma Miskew	Joanne Courtney	Lisa Weagle	Canada
Team; North; America	Jennifer Jones	Kaitlyn Lawes	Jocelyn Peterman	Dawn McEwen	Canada
Team; North; America	Kevin Koe	B. J. Neufeld	Colton Flasch	Ben Hebert	Canada
Team; North; America	John Shuster	Christopher Plys	Matt Hamilton	John Landsteiner	United States
Team; North; America	Jamie Sinclair	Sarah Anderson	Taylor Anderson	Monica Walker	United States
Team; North; America	Coach: Jeff Stoughton, Assistant Coach: Jill Officer, Captain: Pete Fenson				
Team; World	Benoît Schwarz (fourth)	Sven Michel	Peter de Cruz (skip)	Valentin Tanner	Switzerland
Team; World	Niklas Edin	Oskar Eriksson	Rasmus Wranå	Christoffer Sundgren	Sweden
Team; World	Anna Hasselborg	Sara McManus	Agnes Knochenhauer	Sofia Mabergs	Sweden
Team; World	Bruce Mouat	Grant Hardie	Bobby Lammie	Hammy McMillan Jr.	Scotland
Team; World	Eve Muirhead	Jennifer Dodds	Vicki Chalmers	Lauren Gray	Scotland
Team; World	Alina Pätz (fourth)	Silvana Tirinzoni (skip)	Esther Neuenschwander	Melanie Barbezat	Switzerland
Team; World	Coach: Fredrik Lindberg, Assistant Coach: Christoffer Svae, Captain: David Murdoch				

== Events ==
All draw times are listed in Pacific Daylight Time (UTC−7:00).

=== Thursday, January 17 ===
==== Draw 1 ====
Mixed doubles 8:30 am

Sheet A	1	2	3	4	5	6	7	8	Final	Points
North America (Weagle/Gushue) 🔨	1	0	2	0	1	2	1	0	7	0
World (Neuenschwander/de Cruz)	0	3	0	4	0	0	0	3	10	1

Sheet B	1	2	3	4	5	6	7	8	Final	Points
North America (Homan/Koe)	0	1	0	2	0	0	X	X	3	0
World (Dodds/Mouat) 🔨	6	0	2	0	3	1	X	X	12	1

Sheet C	1	2	3	4	5	6	7	8	Final	Points
North America (Peterman/Gallant) 🔨	0	1	2	0	0	0	0	X	3	0
World (Chalmers/McMillan)	1	0	0	3	1	1	3	X	9	1

==== Draw 2 ====
Mixed doubles 1:30 pm

Sheet A	1	2	3	4	5	6	7	8	Final	Points
North America (Jones/Nichols)	0	2	0	1	0	1	0	0	4	0
World (Pätz/Michel) 🔨	1	0	3	0	1	0	2	1	8	1

Sheet B	1	2	3	4	5	6	7	8	Final	Points
North America (M. Walker/Shuster)	0	0	0	3	0	0	1	0	4	0
World (Hasselborg/Eriksson) 🔨	1	1	1	0	1	1	0	1	6	1

Sheet C	1	2	3	4	5	6	7	8	Final	Points
North America (Lawes/G. Walker)	0	0	2	0	1	0	0	X	3	0
World (Knochenhauer/Wranå) 🔨	2	1	0	1	0	3	1	X	8	1

==== Draw 3 ====
Women's team play 6:30 pm

Sheet A	1	2	3	4	5	6	7	8	Final	Points
North America (Jones)	0	2	0	0	0	0	1	0	3	0
World (Muirhead) 🔨	0	0	0	1	0	2	0	2	5	1

Sheet B	1	2	3	4	5	6	7	8	Final	Points
North America (Homan)	0	0	1	0	2	0	0	X	3	0
World (Hasselborg) 🔨	1	1	0	3	0	1	2	X	8	1

Sheet C	1	2	3	4	5	6	7	8	Final	Points
North America (Sinclair) 🔨	2	0	0	1	0	0	1	1	5	0
World (Tirinzoni)	0	2	2	0	1	1	0	0	6	1

=== Friday, January 18 ===
==== Draw 4 ====
Mixed doubles 8:30 am

Sheet A	1	2	3	4	5	6	7	8	Final	Points
North America (Courtney/Neufeld) 🔨	1	0	1	0	1	0	0	X	3	0
World (Tirinzoni/Schwarz)	0	2	0	1	0	5	1	X	9	1

Sheet B	1	2	3	4	5	6	7	8	Final	Points
North America (S. Anderson/Landsteiner)	0	1	0	0	1	1	1	0	4	0
World (Muirhead/Lammie) 🔨	3	0	3	1	0	0	0	1	8	1

Sheet C	1	2	3	4	5	6	7	8	Final	Points
North America (McEwen/Hebert)	2	0	2	0	1	1	0	X	6	1
World (Mabergs/Sundgren) 🔨	0	1	0	1	0	0	1	X	3	0

==== Draw 5 ====
Mixed doubles 1:30 pm

Sheet A	1	2	3	4	5	6	7	8	Final	Points
North America (Miskew/Hamilton) 🔨	2	1	2	1	0	2	0	X	8	1
World (Gray/Hardie)	0	0	0	0	3	0	1	X	4	0

Sheet B	1	2	3	4	5	6	7	8	Final	Points
North America (Sinclair/Plys) 🔨	2	0	2	0	1	0	2	1	8	1
World (McManus/Edin)	0	2	0	1	0	1	0	0	4	0

Sheet C	1	2	3	4	5	6	7	8	Final	Points
North America (T. Anderson/Flasch) 🔨	0	1	2	0	1	1	0	2	7	1
World (Barbezat/Tanner)	1	0	0	2	0	0	3	0	6	0

==== Draw 6 ====
Men's team play 6:30 pm

Sheet A	1	2	3	4	5	6	7	8	Final	Points
North America (Koe)	0	2	0	0	0	2	0	X	4	0
World (de Cruz) 🔨	2	0	0	3	1	0	2	X	8	1

Sheet B	1	2	3	4	5	6	7	8	Final	Points
North America (Shuster)	0	2	0	0	2	0	0	0	4	0
World (Edin) 🔨	2	0	0	2	0	0	0	3	7	1

Sheet C	1	2	3	4	5	6	7	8	Final	Points
North America (Gushue)	0	0	2	0	0	2	0	0	4	0.5
World (Mouat) 🔨	0	2	0	1	0	0	0	1	4	0.5

=== Saturday, January 19 ===
==== Draw 7 ====
Women's team scramble 8:30 am

Sheet A	1	2	3	4	5	6	7	8	Final	Points
North America (Jones/S. Anderson/Peterman/M. Walker) 🔨	0	0	1	0	1	1	0	3	6	0.5
World (Muirhead/Pätz/Chalmers/Barbezat)	1	0	0	3	0	0	2	0	6	0.5

Sheet B	1	2	3	4	5	6	7	8	Final	Points
North America (Homan/Lawes/Courtney/McEwen) 🔨	0	1	0	0	3	0	1	0	5	0
World (Hasselborg/Dodds/Knochenhauer/Gray)	0	0	2	3	0	1	0	0	6	1

Sheet C	1	2	3	4	5	6	7	8	Final	Points
North America (Sinclair/Miskew/T. Anderson/Weagle)	0	0	1	0	0	2	0	X	3	0
World (Tirinzoni/McManus/Neuenschwander/Mabergs) 🔨	2	1	0	3	1	0	1	X	8	1

==== Draw 8 ====
Men's team scramble 1:30 pm

Sheet A	1	2	3	4	5	6	7	8	Final	Points
North America (Koe/Plys/Gallant/Hebert) 🔨	1	0	0	0	3	0	3	X	7	1
World (Mouat/Michel/Lammie/Tanner)	0	1	1	0	0	1	0	X	3	0

Sheet B	1	2	3	4	5	6	7	8	Final	Points
North America (Gushue/Neufeld/Hamilton/G. Walker)	1	0	1	0	0	1	1	0	4	0.5
World (Edin/Hardie/Wranå/McMillan) 🔨	0	1	0	0	2	0	0	1	4	0.5

Sheet C	1	2	3	4	5	6	7	8	Final	Points
North America (Shuster/Nichols/Flasch/Landsteiner)	0	1	0	0	0	0	1	X	2	0
World (Schwarz/Eriksson/de Cruz/Sundgren) 🔨	0	0	2	1	2	1	0	X	6	1

==== Draw 9 ====
Mixed team scramble 6:30 pm

Sheet A	1	2	3	4	5	6	7	8	Final	Points
North America (Gushue/Lawes/Gallant/McEwen) 🔨	0	2	0	1	0	2	2	X	7	2
World (Mouat/Dodds/Lammie/Gray)	1	0	1	0	1	0	0	X	3	0

Sheet B	1	2	3	4	5	6	7	8	Final	Points
North America (Homan/Neufeld/Courtney/Hebert)	2	0	1	0	2	0	0	2	7	2
World (Hasselborg/Eriksson/Knochenhauer/Sundgren) 🔨	0	1	0	1	0	2	0	0	4	0

Sheet C	1	2	3	4	5	6	7	8	Final	Points
North America (Shuster/Sinclair/Hamilton/M. Walker) 🔨	0	1	1	1	2	0	1	0	6	2
World (Schwarz/Pätz/de Cruz/Barbezat)	1	0	0	0	0	2	0	1	4	0

=== Sunday, January 20 ===
==== Draw 10 ====
Skins 11:00 am

Values (points)	½	½	½	½	½	½	1	1		5
Sheet A	1	2	3	4	5	6	7	8	Button	Total
North America (Jones)			0	X	0	0	X			3
World (Tirinzoni) 🔨	0	X						0	X	2

Values (points)	½	½	½	½	½	½	1	1	5
Sheet B	1	2	3	4	5	6	7	8	Total
North America (Nichols/Sinclair/Gallant/T. Anderson)					X				0.5
World (Eriksson/Hasselborg/Sundgren/Mabergs) 🔨	X	X	0	X		X	X	X	4.5

Values (points)	½	½	½	½	½	½	1	1	5
Sheet C	1	2	3	4	5	6	7	8	Total
North America (Shuster)									0
World (de Cruz) 🔨	0	X	X	X	0	X	0	X	5

==== Draw 11 ====
Skins 4:00 pm

Values (points)	½	½	½	½	½	½	1	1	5
Sheet A	1	2	3	4	5	6	7	8	Total
North America (Homan)	0	0	X	X	X				2.5
World (Muirhead) 🔨						0	0	X	2.5

Values (points)	½	½	½	½	½	½	1	1	5
Sheet B	1	2	3	4	5	6	7	8	Total
North America (Gushue/S. Anderson/G. Walker/M. Walker)	X	X	0	0	0	0	X		4
World (Edin/McManus/Wranå/Knochenhauer) 🔨								X	1

Values (points)	½	½	½	½	½	½	1	1	5
Sheet C	1	2	3	4	5	6	7	8	Total
North America (Koe)	0	X	X	X	X		X		3.5
World (Mouat) 🔨						X		X	1.5
