= Jennifer Jones (curler) =

Canadian curler (born 1974)

- Curler
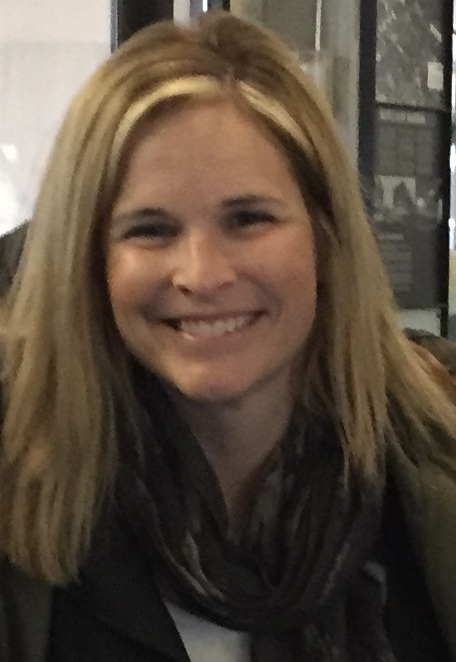
- Jones in 2019
- Born: July 7, 1974 (age 52); Winnipeg, Manitoba, Canada
- Height: 173 cm (5 ft 8 in)

Team
- Curling club: Barrie CC, Barrie, Ontario
- Mixed doubles partner: Brent Laing

Curling career
- Member Association: Manitoba (1990–2024); Ontario (c. 2016–present)
- Hearts: 18 (2002, 2005, 2006, 2007, 2008, 2009, 2010, 2011, 2012, 2013, 2015, 2016, 2018, 2019, 2020, 2021, 2023, 2024)
- World Championship: 6 (2005, 2008, 2009, 2010, 2015, 2018)
- World Mixed Doubles Championship: 1 (2023)
- Olympic: 2 (2014, 2022)
- Top CTRS ranking: 1st (2005–06, 2006–07, 2007–08, 2009–10, 2010–11, 2011–12, 2013–14, 2014–15, 2017–18)
- Grand Slam victories: 17 (2006 Players', 2007 Autumn Gold, 2007 Players', 2008 Wayden Transportation, 2009 Players', 2009 Autumn Gold, 2010 Sobeys Slam, 2011 Players', 2013 Manitoba Liquor & Lotteries, 2013 Colonial Square, 2014 Players', 2014 Autumn Gold, 2016 Champions Cup, 2017 Players', 2017 Masters, 2017 National, 2023 Tour Challenge)
Medal record
Women's curling
Representing Canada
Winter Olympics
Gold medal – first place	2014 Sochi	Team
World Championships
Gold medal – first place	2008 Vernon
Gold medal – first place	2018 North Bay
Silver medal – second place	2015 Sapporo
Bronze medal – third place	2010 Swift Current
Scotties Tournament of Hearts
Gold medal – first place	2009 Victoria
Gold medal – first place	2010 Sault Ste. Marie
Silver medal – second place	2006 London
Silver medal – second place	2011 Charlottetown
Bronze medal – third place	2016 Grande Prairie
Representing Manitoba
Canadian Olympic Curling Trials
Gold medal – first place	2013 Winnipeg
Gold medal – first place	2021 Saskatoon
Bronze medal – third place	2017 Ottawa
Scotties Tournament of Hearts
Gold medal – first place	2005 St. John's
Gold medal – first place	2008 Regina
Gold medal – first place	2015 Moose Jaw
Gold medal – first place	2018 Penticton
Silver medal – second place	2013 Kingston
Silver medal – second place	2023 Kamloops
Silver medal – second place	2024 Calgary
Bronze medal – third place	2007 Lethbridge
Bronze medal – third place	2012 Red Deer
Representing (Manitoba) Team Wild Card
Scotties Tournament of Hearts
Bronze medal – third place	2020 Moose Jaw
Representing Ontario
Canadian Mixed Doubles Championship
Gold medal – first place	2023 Sudbury
Bronze medal – third place	2017 Saskatoon

Jennifer Judith Jones OM (born July 7, 1974) is a Canadian curler. She was the Olympic champion in curling as skip of the Canadian team at the 2014 Sochi Games. Jones is the first female skip to go through the Games undefeated. The only male skip to achieve this was fellow Canadian Kevin Martin in 2010. Jones and her team were the first Manitoba-based curling team to win an Olympic gold medal. They won the 2008 World Women's Curling Championship and were the last Canadian women's team to do so until Rachel Homan in 2017. She won a second world championship in 2018. Jones also represented Canada at the 2022 Winter Olympics, where her team placed fifth.

Jones has won the Canadian women's curling championship a record-tying six times (in 2005, 2008, 2009, 2010, 2015, and 2018), equalling Colleen Jones for total Canadian women's championships. Along with her national championships, Jones has also won the Manitoba women's provincial championship nine times. In a total of eighteen Tournament of Hearts appearances, she has won 177 games, more than any other curler. In addition to her accomplishments internationally, nationally, and provincially, she has also won seventeen Grand Slam of Curling events on the World Curling Tour, ten of which are recognized as current Grand Slam victories. (Note: Some sources count this as Jones' seventeenth career Slam, as she has won seventeen Grand Slam events since the beginning of the Grand Slam of Curling. Other sources count this as her tenth career Slam, as they exclude events prior to Sportsnet's ownership of the Grand Slams.) In 2019, Jones was named the greatest Canadian curler in history by The Sports Network (TSN).

== Early and personal life ==
Jennifer Judith Jones was born in Winnipeg to Larry and Carol Jones, who were both curlers. She also has a sister, Heather, who is 18 months older. During her childhood, Jones was often described as shy. Her interest in curling began in a daycare at the St. Vital Curling Club, and Larry Jones started teaching her curling when she was 11. She attended General Vanier School in South Winnipeg from kindergarten to grade 8, after which she attended Windsor Park Collegiate. At that point, Jones was proficient at volleyball and curling. "When I was in high school, I really had to make a choice, and it was actually my volleyball coach who told me I had to choose either volleyball or curling, and I chose curling," she told the CBC. She attended the University of Manitoba from 1999 to 2001.

At the University of Manitoba, she earned a B.A. in psychology and economics and a LL.B. In 2008, she was an in-house counsel for Wellington West Capital. She later worked for National Bank Financial as a lawyer (as of 2013) and a senior legal advisor (as of 2018). As of 2019, in addition to being a lawyer, Jones is also a motivational speaker. Jones is married to former world champion curler Brent Laing from Ontario; their daughters were born on November 13, 2012, in Barrie, Ontario and on August 18, 2016. In late 2016, Jones moved to Horseshoe Valley, near Barrie, Ontario, with Laing and their daughters. A residency policy change adopted by Curling Canada in 2015 allowed one team member to live out-of-province and continue to represent the province, so Jones continued to represent Manitoba.

== Curling career ==
=== Juniors ===
Jones began curling at the age of 11. She won three provincial junior championships and a national junior championship as a junior curler. Her first provincial junior competition was in 1990, when she was 15. Jones' father coached the team, which included her sister Heather at second, Tracey Lavery at third, and Dana Malanchuk at lead. The team went 1–2 before being eliminated. After the tournament, Jones was recruited to play third for Jill Staub. In 1991, Jones won her first provincial junior title, playing third for Staub. The team, which also included Kristie Moroz at second and Kelly Scott (then Mackenzie) at lead, defeated Denise Blashko in the Manitoba final. The team represented Manitoba at the 1991 Canadian Junior Curling Championships in Leduc, Alberta. They finished the round-robin in first place with a 10–1 record. This gave them a bye to the final, which they lost to New Brunswick, skipped by Heather Smith.

After the loss, Jones set out to skip her own team. She approached Jill Officer, in whom she saw great potential at the Highlander Curling Club in Winnipeg. "We got together when we were quite young and had an instant connection on the ice and became really good friends." says Jones. Jones, Trisha Baldwin, Officer, and Malanchuk made it to the provincial junior final in 1992, which they lost, 10–6, to her former teammate and fellow club mate, Tracey Lavery. Jones won her second provincial junior title in 1993, this time as a skip. Her team, which consisted of Baldwin at third, Officer at second, and Malanchuk at lead, defeated the Erin Moffatt rink in the Manitoba final. At the 1993 Canadian Juniors, the team finished the round robin with an 8–3 record, tied for third with Nova Scotia and Quebec. The team lost against Quebec (skipped by Janique Berthelot) in their tie-breaker match, eliminating them from the tournament.

The following year, Jones's team won their second straight provincial junior title, beating Jones's former teammate Kelly Mackenzie in the Manitoba final, and went unbeaten in the provincial championship. At the 1994 Canadian Juniors, they once again finished the round robin in a three-way tie for third, this time with Ontario and Northern Ontario, and with a 7–4 record. In their first tie-breaker, they defeated Northern Ontario's Rhonda Halvorsen, 10–4. They then defeated Ontario's Dominique Lascelles 10–8 in the second tie-breaker. This put the team into the semifinal against British Columbia's Jeanna Richard (Schraeder), whom they beat 5–3. The win put them in the final against the first place Saskatchewan rink, skipped by Sherry Linton. The team beat Saskatchewan 8–5, claiming the 1994 Canadian Junior title. During the final, Jones suffered a black eye and bumped her head after tripping over her feet. Jones told the CBC, "[My eye] is really sore, and I've got the biggest headache of my life." Ordinarily, winning the Canadian Juniors would mean a berth in the following year's World Junior Curling Championships, but a change in the ruling by the Canadian Curling Association (CCA) forced the team to play in a playoff the following year at the 1995 Canadian Juniors for the right to attend. Since Jones' team lost the 1995 Manitoba junior final to Kelly Mackenzie's team, the CCA gave them another chance to qualify by placing them directly in the semifinals of the Canadian Juniors. There, Jones played against MacKenzie and lost again.

=== Early women's career ===
After juniors, Jones and Officer joined the Karen Porritt rink and attempted to qualify for the 1997 Canadian Olympic Curling Trials. Jones played third on the team, while Officer played second and later moved to lead. Jones replaced Northern Ontario import Kim Clark on the team. The team made it to the 1999 Manitoba Tournament of Hearts, the provincial women's championship, but were eliminated in a B-side qualifier to the Karen Young rink. The following season, Jones took over skipping the rink. That season, Jones failed to make it to the Manitoba Hearts, having lost in the final of the last qualifying berth to Lois Fowler.

In 2001, Jones and her rink of Porritt, Porritt's twin sister Lynn Fallis-Kurz, and Jones' junior lead, Dana Allerton qualified for the 2001 Manitoba Scott Tournament of Hearts, where they lost the final to Karen Young. The following year, the team won the Manitoba Hearts, defeating Linda Van Daele in the provincial final. The win earned the rink the right to represent the province at the 2002 Scott Tournament of Hearts, the Canadian national women's championship. At the 2002 Hearts, Jones led her Manitoba rink to an 8–3 round robin finish, which placed them in third place. This placement put them in the playoffs, where she lost to Ontario's Sherry Middaugh. The following season, Jones replaced Porritt with Kimberly Keizer at third. The team made it to the final of the 2003 Manitoba Scott Tournament of Hearts but lost to Barb Spencer in the final.

Porritt was brought back onto the team the following season, replacing Keizer, while Jones' junior teammate Jill Officer was also added at second with Fallis-Kurz moving to lead. The team had less success at the 2004 Manitoba Scott Tournament of Hearts, losing in the quarterfinal to Joelle Duguid.

=== 2005 and "The Shot" ===
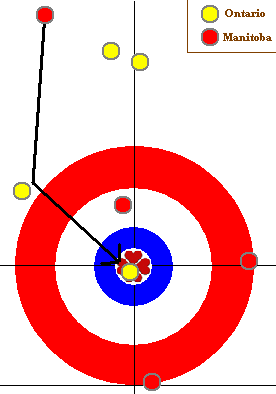
"The Shot": Jones had to make a difficult in-off to score four and win the 2005 Scott Tournament of Hearts.

Prior to the 2004–05 season, it was announced that Jones would be forming a new team with former Hearts champions Cathy Overton-Clapham at third and Cathy Gauthier at lead, with Officer remaining at second. It was the first time Jones had met Overton-Clapham. The team went on to win the 2005 Manitoba Hearts, defeating clubmate Kristy Jenion in the final. At the provincials, the team had to win five straight games in 28 hours in order to win the title.

Representing Manitoba at the 2005 Scott Tournament of Hearts, the team went on to win the national championship by defeating Team Ontario, skipped by Jenn Hanna, in the final. Ontario controlled most of the game until the final end, with Jones herself struggling, curling just 70 percent. She faced an extremely difficult shot to win, having to hit a rock outside of the house and roll to the button, taking out an Ontario rock. She would have lost both the game and the tournament if she had missed. The shot was perfect, scoring 4 points with her final stone and winning the game. CBC analyst Mike Harris described it as "the best shot I've ever seen to win a game". Revered by Canadian sports media and curling fans, Jones' accomplishment under pressure was quickly dubbed "The Shot". TSN has rated the shot as one of the best ever at the Tournament of Hearts, stating "[t]o this day, most will make the case this shot is the greatest in the history of the Scotties."

The team's win qualified them for the 2005 World Women's Curling Championship in Paisley, Scotland. There, they struggled with poor ice conditions and were knocked out of the playoffs in the 3 vs. 4 game against Dordi Nordby and her Norway rink.

=== Team changes ===
In the off-season, Jones replaced Gauthier at the lead position with 2002 Olympic bronze medallist Georgina Wheatcroft, who had also won the 2000 World Championship. This was done partly to boost the team's chances at the 2005 Canadian Olympic Curling Trials in December, the first time Jones had qualified for an Olympic Trial. However, the team finished 5–4 and failed to reach the playoffs. In the trials, Jones also experienced a case of kidney stones and was rushed to the hospital. She described it as "the worst pain I've ever had". Earlier in the season, the team had won two tour bonspiels, the Casinos of Winnipeg Curling Classic and the Labatt Cash Spiel.

Because Jones had won the 2005 Scott Tournament of Hearts, she returned to the 2006 Scott Tournament of Hearts in London, Ontario as Team Canada. At the Hearts that year, she defeated Colleen Jones's team from Nova Scotia in the semifinal before losing to her former teammate Kelly Scott of Kelowna, British Columbia in the final. At the end of the season, the team beat Cheryl Bernard to win the 2006 Players' Championship, the first time the event had a women's draw, following the merger of the World Curling Tour and the Women's Tour.

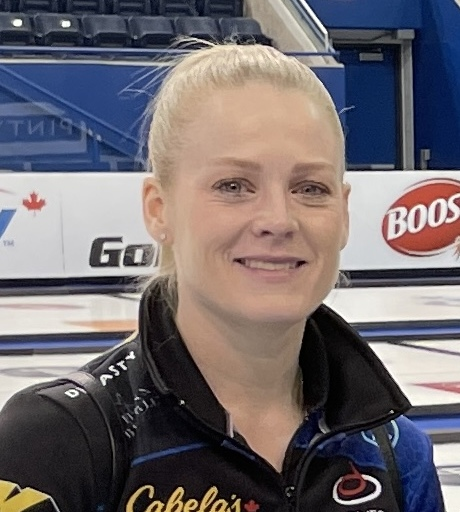
Dawn McEwen (formerly Askin), Jones' lead beginning in 2007

In 2006, Wheatcroft moved back to her home of Vancouver, British Columbia, to live with the rest of her family and to play with her former skip, Kelley Law. She was replaced by Dana Allerton. The team had a strong start to the 2006–07 season, winning the Colonial Square Ladies Classic, and the John Shea Insurance Canada Cup Qualifier. Just before the 2007 provincial playdowns, Jones dropped Allerton from the team in favour of the team's fifth player and coach Janet Arnott. Jones won another provincial championship in 2007 over Darcy Robertson, earning her a berth at the 2007 Scotties Tournament of Hearts. There, she made the playoffs, but lost to Kelly Scott again, this time in the semifinal. During the off-season, Jones switched leads again, gaining Dawn Askin from the Jenn Hanna rink. Askin had just moved from Ottawa. Jones won her first Canada Cup of Curling in March 2007, defeating Cathy King in the final. The team wrapped up the season by winning their second straight Players' title, defeating Kelly Scott in the final.

=== World Championship success ===
In the 2007–08 curling season, Jones had several successes, including winning the 2007 Autumn Gold Grand Slam over Shannon Kleibrink, the Oslo Cup, and the Red Deer Curling Classic. Later in the season, she also won the 2008 Manitoba Provincial Championship, defeating Barb Spencer in the final. This qualified her to represent the province at the 2008 Scotties Tournament of Hearts in Regina, Saskatchewan. Jones got off to a slow start, having just a 3–4 record to start the week, but then won four consecutive games for a 7–4 record, which earned a spot in the tiebreaker match. There, she defeated Heather Strong from Newfoundland and Labrador, 6–3. In the first playoff game, Jones defeated Quebec skip Marie-France Larouche, 6–5. She advanced to the semifinals, where she defeated Ontario's Sherry Middaugh 9–8 by stealing a point in the extra end. In the final, Jones faced Alberta's Shannon Kleibrink. In the final stone, Kleibrink had the opportunity to score a big end for the win but only managed to knock out one Manitoba stone, giving Jones' team a 6–4 victory and a second Canadian title.

After winning the Canadian Championships, Jones competed at the 2008 World Women's Curling Championship in Vernon, British Columbia. This time, the team had access to top coaches, athletic therapists and sports psychologists like Dr. Cal Botterill. During one game, they were down 6–1 after four ends to Debbie McCormick of America when coach Janet Arnott delivered a speech. TSN analyst Cathy Gauthier said, "I heard Janet say something once, and it really stuck in my head". The Canadians made a comeback, winning 10–9. After making another comeback in the semifinal, Jones qualified for the final and defeated China's Wang Bingyu to capture her first World Championship by a score of 7–4, finishing the week with an overall record of 11–3.

=== Repeat Hearts championships ===
Early on in the 2008–09 season, Jones' team won the Wayden Transportation Ladies Classic, a Grand Slam event at the time, defeating Stefanie Lawton in the final. The team also won the 2009 Glynhill Ladies International in Scotland. The team competed in a "battle of the sexes" in the semifinal of the 2009 Casino Rama Curling Skins Game against former world men's champion Glenn Howard. The Jones rink won just one skin against Howard's seven, and earned $1,500.

Jones and her team competed at the 2009 Tournament of Hearts as defending champions. They posted a round-robin record of 7–4, which led to a tiebreaker match against Rebecca Jean MacPhee of Prince Edward Island, which they won, 6–5. They beat Quebec's Marie-France Larouche 12–8 in the semifinals and beat British Columbia's Marla Mallett in the final to 8–5 to win their second consecutive title. The win at the Scotties sent the Jones rink back to the World Championship, where they lost in the bronze medal game to Angelina Jensen from Denmark. Jones ended the season by winning her third Players' Championship, beating Shannon Kleibrink in the final.

The rink started the 2009–10 season by winning the Oslo Cup, and winning their second Autumn Gold Grand Slam at the 2009 Trail Appliances Curling Classic, defeating Wang Bingyu of China in the final. A month later, they won the Red Deer Curling Classic. The team participated in the 2009 Canadian Olympic Curling Trials in mid-December. There the team failed to make the playoffs, finishing the round robin tied for sixth place with a 2–5 record. Jones later revealed that she was sick all week and unable to play well. "We worked really, really hard and wanted to excel at this event, but it just didn't work out," Jones told reporters.

Jones and her team again returned to the Scotties as defending champions, Team Canada, at the 2010 Scotties Tournament of Hearts. In the round robin, the team finished tied for first with an 8–3 record. The team was seeded second behind the upstart P.E.I. rink, skipped by Kathy O'Rourke, with Erin Carmody throwing last rocks. The page 1 vs 2 playoff featured the two teams, where Jones won and went through to the final. P.E.I. then beat Ontario in the semifinal to force a rematch of the page playoff. In the finals, P.E.I. led 6–3 after 6 ends. Jones stole a point in the eighth and two more in the ninth to make the score 7–6 for Team Canada. P.E.I. tied the game with a single point in the tenth, forcing an 11th end. Finally, Jones picked a P.E.I. stone out of the four-foot in the extra end to win the tournament, completing another Scotties comeback and securing her third consecutive Tournament of Hearts victory and fourth Hearts victory in total. "It's pretty incredible and the way we won, the way we came back," said Jones. Jones' third win in a row put her in the elite company of Vera Pezer and Colleen Jones as the only skips to have won three Tournament of Hearts in a row. As this was also her fourth win in total, she and second Jill Officer became part of a group of four curlers to have won four Scotties; they joined Vera Pezer and Lee Morrison of Saskatoon. The win was Cathy Overton-Clapham's fifth in total, one off of Colleen Jones' record.

At the 2010 Ford World Women's Curling Championship, after finishing the round robin with a 10–1 record, Jones lost all her playoff games except the bronze medal game against Sweden. Jones claimed her second world championship medal in four tries with that bronze. The team finished the season at the 2010 Players' Championships, where they lost in the quarterfinals. Following the season, the team replaced third Cathy Overton-Clapham with the younger Kaitlyn Lawes in time for the 2010–11 curling season.

=== 2010–13 ===
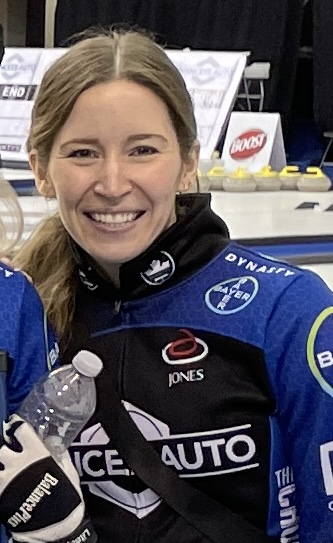
Kaitlyn Lawes, Jones' new third.

With new third Kaitlyn Lawes, Jones' team won the 2010 Sobeys Slam early in the 2010–11 season, beating Chelsea Carey for the title. A week later, they won the 2010 Sun Life Classic, and later won the 2011 Karuizawa International Curling Championship. They represented Team Canada at the 2011 Scotties Tournament of Hearts as defending champions. As Jones' former third Cathy Overton-Clapham was representing Manitoba there, their round-robin matchup was seen as a grudge match, with Overton-Clapham as the underdog and fan favourite. Overton-Clapham "curled her finest game of the tournament" and Jones "struggled mightily", resulting in Team Manitoba winning the game 8–5. Despite that loss, Jones had a successful round robin overall, leading her team to an 8–3 round robin record. In the playoffs, the team defeated Saskatchewan's Amber Holland in the 1 vs. 2 game, but lost to the Holland rink in the final. They wrapped up the season by winning the 2011 Players' Championship over Rachel Homan.

The next season, Jones won another Oslo Cup, and then won her second Canada Cup title in 2011, defeating Chelsea Carey in the final. Jones beat Carey again in the final of the 2012 Manitoba Scotties Tournament of Hearts, earning her the right to represent Manitoba at the 2012 Scotties Tournament of Hearts. There, the team was seeded first after the round robin with a 9–2 record. However, they lost both of their page playoff games, first against Jones' former teammate Kelly Scott skipping British Columbia, and then to Alberta's Heather Nedohin in the semifinal. The team rebounded to win the bronze medal game against Quebec's Marie-France Larouche.

Jones did not compete at the start of the 2012–13 curling season, following a knee surgery in June 2012 and giving birth in November. Rejoining her team at the beginning of 2013, Jones won another provincial title, defeating Barb Spencer in the Manitoba final. At the 2013 Tournament of Hearts, where her Manitoba rink finished second, Jones became the second Canadian woman to record 100 wins as a skip at the Canadian championships.

=== Olympic Gold ===
Team Jones had a strong tour season throughout the 2013–14 season, reaching the playoffs in every event they competed in. Beginning the season at the 2013 China Open, the team finished 5–2 through the round robin before two straight playoff loses to finish fourth. They then played in the 2013 Curlers Corner Autumn Gold Curling Classic Grand Slam where they lost in the quarterfinals to Eve Muirhead. At the 2013 Manitoba Liquor & Lotteries Women's Classic, the team recorded their first event win of the season, going undefeated before shutting out Jill Thurston 7–0 in the final. The following week, they again lost to Muirhead, this time in the semifinals of the 2013 Masters. In their next event, they won four straight sudden-death games to claim the 2013 Colonial Square Ladies Classic, winning 7–3 in the final against Switzerland's Michèle Jäggi. It was Jones' tenth Slam title.

Jones' rink entered the Olympic Trials in Winnipeg as the number one ranked team in the world. They began the tournament with a dominant 10–2 victory over Chelsea Carey followed by a stolen 9–7 extra end win against Sherry Middaugh. In their third game, they lost 9–6 to Val Sweeting before winning the rest of their games in the round robin. With wins over Renée Sonnenberg, Stefanie Lawton, Rachel Homan and Heather Nedohin, the team finished 6–1 and earned a direct bye to the championship game. There, they faced Team Middaugh, whom they had narrowly defeated in the round robin. Jones began the game with hammer and blanked the first end. In the second, Middaugh missed her final draw, allowing Jones to execute a double takeout for three points. From there, the Winnipeg squad led the rest of the game, scoring another three points in the seventh end to extend their lead to 7–3. After trading single points in the eighth and ninth ends, Jones ran Middaugh out of rocks in the tenth end for a decisive 8–4 win and the right to represent Team Canada at the 2014 Winter Olympics.

In February 2014, the team travelled to Sochi, Russia to represent Canada at the Olympic Games. In the round robin, the team was unstoppable, winning all nine of their matches by a combined score of 72–40. With their win over Korea's Kim Ji-sun in the final round robin draw, they became the first women's team to go through the round robin of an Olympic Games undefeated. They continued this momentum into the semifinal, winning 6–4 against Muirhead's British team to qualify for the gold medal game. There, they took on Sweden's Margaretha Sigfridsson. The final was a tight game, with Jones scoring one point in the eighth end to take a one-point lead. In the ninth end, Swedish fourth Maria Prytz made a big mistake as she rubbed her own stone and gave up a steal of two, allowing Canada to go up 6–3 with one end remaining. There, Jones ensured the gold medal with a takeout on her first stone to run the Swedes out of rocks. With the win, Jones made history, becoming the first-ever female skip in Olympic history to go undefeated through the tournament. The only male skip to achieve it was fellow Canadian Kevin Martin in 2010. After the win, she said that "We're Olympic gold medallists. It's something that you dream of for your entire life. It's what every athlete wants to do, and we did it today. And we did it in a way where we played so consistent all week. On the biggest stage for sport, we came out and played our best. And I'm so so proud of us." Two months later, the team played in the 2014 Players' Championship, where they asserted their status as the best team in the world, defeating Rachel Homan 5–2 to claim their third Slam title of the season.

=== Post-Olympics and fifth Hearts title ===
Team Jones began the new Olympic cycle by adding another Slam title, the 2014 Curlers Corner Autumn Gold Curling Classic. In the final, they beat defending Canadian champion Rachel Homan 6–5. The team won another event title two weeks later at the Canad Inns Women's Classic, downing Jill Thurston in the final. Next for the Jones rink was the 2014 Masters where they reached the semifinals before losing to Sweden's Margaretha Sigfridsson in a rematch of the Olympic gold medal game. At their next event, the DeKalb Superspiel, the team went undefeated until the final where they lost to Northern Ontario's Tracy Horgan. After competing at the 2014 Canada Cup, where they failed to qualify for the playoffs, Team Jones won their third title of the season at the Karuizawa International, defeating Korea's Kim Eun-jung 8–6 in the championship game. In the new year, they played in the 2015 Continental Cup of Curling where they helped Team Canada secure a third straight title. They also participated in the 2015 Pinty's All-Star Curling Skins Game where they finished runner-up to the Homan rink, earning $29,500 in the process.

At the 2015 Manitoba Scotties Tournament of Hearts, the Jones rink posted an undefeated record to secure the provincial title. After a 7–0 round robin record, they beat Kerri Einarson twice in the playoffs. This earned them a trip to the 2015 Scotties Tournament of Hearts where they had a near perfect run. The team finished first through the round robin, suffering just one loss to Nova Scotia's Mary-Anne Arsenault. In the playoffs, they beat Alberta's Val Sweeting 8–6 in the 1 vs. 2 game and faced them again in the final after Alberta beat Saskatchewan in the semifinal. In the final, the Manitoba rink never trailed, taking one in the tenth end to secure a 6–5 victory and giving Jones her fifth Hearts title.

The next month, Jones and her teammates represented Canada at the 2015 World Women's Curling Championship which took place in Sapporo, Japan. In the round robin, they suffered two losses to Sweden's Sigfridsson and Switzerland's Alina Pätz. Their 9–2 record earned them second place and a spot in the 1 vs. 2 game which they lost to Switzerland. They bounced back in the semifinal, however, defeating Russia's Anna Sidorova to set up a third rematch against the Swiss. After giving up two points in the first half, Jones made a costly mistake in the sixth end when her final draw sailed through the rings, giving up a steal of two. The team did not recover from this error, with Pätz drawing the button in the tenth end for a 5–3 victory, handing the Canadians the silver medal. They ended their season at the 2015 Players' Championship where they finished with a 1–4 record.

=== Scotties drought and road to 2018 ===
The Jones rink struggled to find consistency to begin the 2015–16 season, failing to qualify for the playoffs at the 2015 GSOC Tour Challenge Grand Slam and not making any tour finals. In October, they reached their first final at the 2015 Canad Inns Women's Classic where they lost 7–6 to Kim Eun-jung. After back-to-back quarterfinal finishes at the 2015 Masters and 2015 National, Team Jones claimed their first title of the season at the DeKalb Superspiel, going undefeated through the event and downing Erika Brown in the final. In December, they qualified for the playoffs of the 2015 Canada Cup but lost in the semifinal to Val Sweeting. The following week, they again had an undefeated record at the 2015 Canadian Open up until the final where they lost 8–7 to Team Homan. In January, the team played in the 2016 Continental Cup where the North American team defeated Team World by one point, giving Jones a record sixth Continental Cup victory. They also played in the 2016 Pinty's All-Star Curling Skins Game where they won the title, defeating Team Sweeting in the final to take home $54,000.

As defending champions, the Jones rink represented Team Canada at the 2016 Scotties Tournament of Hearts. After losing two of their first three games, the defending champions rattled off eight straight victories to finish the round robin with a 9–2 record and a spot in the 1 vs. 2 game. There, they lost 7–5 to Alberta's Chelsea Carey, dropping them into the semifinal game against Northern Ontario's Krista McCarville. Team Jones had early control of the game but gave up pivotal steals in the ninth and tenth ends, ultimately losing 7–5 and not succeeding in defending their title. They ended the week on a high note by defeating Manitoba's Kerri Einarson 8–7 to claim the bronze medal.

After their third-place finish at the Hearts, Team Jones turned things around at the last two events of the season, the 2016 Players' Championship and the 2016 Champions Cup Grand Slams. At the Players', they finished 4–1 through the round robin before wins in the quarter and semifinals to reach the final. There, they lost 9–6 to Scotland's Eve Muirhead, taking second place. Two weeks later, at the Champions Cup, they lost one game in the round robin before four straight victories to reach another final. This time, they successfully defeated Rachel Homan 7–5 to end the season on a high note with Jones claiming her twelfth Slam (sixth excluding defunct events).

Jones missed her team's first event of the 2016–17 season as she was on maternity leave. At the Colonial Square Ladies Classic, she was replaced by 2010 Olympic silver medallist Cheryl Bernard and the team made it to the semifinals. She also missed the team's second event, the Stockholm Ladies Curling Cup, as she was competing in the Canad Inns Mixed Doubles Championship with husband Brent Laing. Jones and Laing finished fourth at the event, losing in both the semifinal and bronze medal game. At the Stockholm Cup, former Scotties champion Alison Kreviazuk filled in at second while Officer and Lawes moved up to third and skip respectively. They lost in the quarterfinals to Anna Hasselborg. Back with her team for the first time in October, Jones led her rink to the finals of the Autumn Gold Curling Classic where they lost in an extra end to Casey Scheidegger. After a string of quarterfinal finishes, Team Jones ran the table at the DeKalb Superspiel to defend their title, defeating Michelle Englot 8–3 in the final. They carried this momentum into the 2016 Canada Cup where they were the class of the field, finishing the round robin with a 5–1 record. This qualified them directly for the final where they stole four in the third end to down Team Homan 9–5, giving Jones her third career Canada Cup title.

After helping North America secure another Continental Cup title the following month, Team Jones entered the 2017 Manitoba Scotties Tournament of Hearts attempting to make it back to the national championship. Through the round robin, the team were dominant front runners, winning all seven of their preliminary matches to reach the 1 vs. 1 game. There, they lost to Michelle Englot, knocking them into the semifinal which they also lost to Darcy Robertson. The loss marked the first time since 2004 that Jones did not win the event (having also participated). Despite the loss, her team bounced back quickly the next week at the 2017 Pinty's All-Star Curling Skins Game, winning the event for a second straight year and a first place cheque of $53,000. In April, Jones led her team to their sole Grand Slam title of the season, defeating Val Sweeting 8–4 to capture the 2017 Players' Championship, Jones' seventh title. They were not able to defend their Champions Cup title, however, losing out in the quarterfinals to Rachel Homan.

While failing to qualify for the Scotties, Jones and doubles partner Brent Laing made their debut at the 2017 Canadian Mixed Doubles Curling Championship, the first championship for the pair. Through the round robin, they finished first amongst their pool with a 6–1 record, qualifying directly for the quarterfinals. They then beat Janet and Hugh Murphy before losing in the semifinals to Rachel Homan and John Morris. Still, their performance was good enough to qualify them for the 2018 Canadian Mixed Doubles Curling Olympic Trials the following season.

=== Second World title ===
Team Jones began the 2017–18 season early at the 2017 CCT Arctic Cup in May. They went undefeated until the final, losing 5–3 to Anna Sidorova. They continued this strong play into the fall, reaching the semifinals of the 2017 GSOC Tour Challenge and the final of the 2017 Colonial Square Ladies Classic, losing out to Val Sweeting and Shannon Birchard respectively. At their next two events, the 2017 Masters and the 2017 National, the team was dominant, going an undefeated 14–0 to claim two consecutive Slam titles. At the Masters, they topped Kerri Einarson 6–5 while at the National, they edged Casey Scheidegger 8–7.

Entering the 2017 Canadian Olympic Curling Trials, Team Jones was the top ranked Canadian women's team and looked to defend their trials title from 2013. Jones, with teammates Lawes, Officer and McEwen had a perfect start to the week, winning their first five games to lead the round robin pool. In their sixth game, they faced co-leader Chelsea Carey and suffered their first loss 7–5. They also lost their next two games to Krista McCarville and Rachel Homan, finishing the round robin with a 5–3 record. This was good enough to advance to the semifinals where they again faced Team Homan. Chasing the entire game, the team suffered their fourth straight loss and were eliminated from the event in third place. Despite this, Jones had another chance to qualify for the Games through the 2018 Canadian Mixed Doubles Curling Olympic Trials. As her regular partner Brent Laing won the men's trials with Kevin Koe, Mark Nichols slotted in as Jones' partner for the Olympic run. The pair gelled well immediately, finishing 8–3 through the round robin and championship rounds to reach the final four. Ultimately, their run came to an end in the 3 vs. 4 page playoff game with a 5–4 loss to Jocelyn Peterman and Brett Gallant. In the final, Jones' third Kaitlyn Lawes won the event with partner John Morris.

Having not qualified for the Olympics, Jones shifted her focus to the 2018 Scotties Tournament of Hearts. In January, the team competed in the provincial championship where Jones won her eighth title. After a 6–1 round robin record, they beat Team Einarson in the 1 vs. 1 game to reach the final. There, they avenged their semifinal loss from 2017, taking two in the tenth end to defeat Darcy Robertson 7–6. This earned them the right to represent Manitoba at the national championship in Penticton, British Columbia, but Lawes was unavailable due to her participation in mixed doubles at the 2018 Winter Olympics. Because of this, the team added Shannon Birchard to the lineup at the third position while Lawes was named as the team's alternate, despite her presence in Korea. In preparation for the Scotties, Birchard joined the team as their alternate at the 2018 Canadian Open where they reached the semifinals, losing out to Michelle Englot. At the Hearts, Team Jones dominated the rest of the field, suffering just two round robin losses to Wild Card (Einarson) and Northern Ontario (Fleury). They then won four straight championship pool games and defeated Wild Card in the page 1 vs. 2 to qualify for the national final. Once again facing Einarson, the team scored two points in the tenth end for an 8–6 victory. With her sixth Scotties title, Jones tied Colleen Jones' record for most Scotties titles.

Following her return from South Korea, Lawes joined the Jones team and reprised her spot at third, moving Birchard to alternate. The team's victory in Penticton meant they won the right to wear the maple leaf at the 2018 World Women's Curling Championship taking place in North Bay, Ontario. There, they continued to thrive, going through the round robin undefeated. They then beat Jamie Sinclair and her American team in the semifinal, earning the right to face the Olympic champion, Anna Hasselborg of Sweden, in the final. Team Jones would have to take Hasselborg to an extra end but ultimately won the game without having to throw their last rock. The victory was Jones' second World Championship victory and would be the last for long-time second Jill Officer, as she announced she was stepping back from the game. Jones, with tears in her eyes, said of the final game with Officer that "I'm just so thrilled to be able to stand on top of the podium with these girls one more time." It had earlier been announced that Jocelyn Peterman would be joining the team the following season, coming over from Team Carey to replace Officer.

Still with two Slams to play before ending her run with Officer, Jones marched through the 2018 Players' Championship up until the final, losing a lopsided 7–2 game to Jamie Sinclair's American side. At the 2018 Champions Cup, they had a shaky start but defeated Val Sweeting in a tiebreaker to qualify. They then beat Silvana Tirinzoni in the quarterfinals before a semifinal loss to Team Einarson ended their season and Jones and Officer's run together, having first joined forces in 1992.

=== Jocelyn Peterman joins the team ===
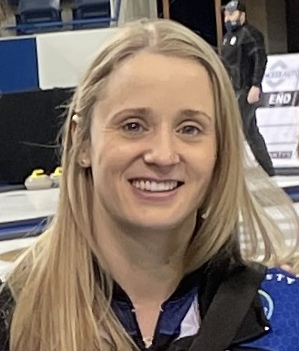
Jocelyn Peterman, Jones' new second following the retirement of longtime teammate Jill Officer.

With new second Jocelyn Peterman, Team Jones found quick success at the first Slam event of the season, the 2018 Elite 10. There, the squad won all four of their round robin matches before losing out in the semifinals to Silvana Tirinzoni. The next month, they made it to the final of the 2018 Curlers Corner Autumn Gold Curling Classic where they lost to the new Kerri Einarson team. Next, the team represented Canada at the 2018 China Open, finishing third. At both the 2018 Masters and the 2018 Tour Challenge, Team Jones lost in the quarterfinals to Anna Hasselborg and Nina Roth respectively.

In December 2018, the Jones rink competed in the 2018 Canada Cup, their first all-Canadian event as a new squad. In the round robin, they lost two games to Einarson and Laura Walker but won the rest to qualify for the semifinal. After downing Team Homan 8–4, Jones entered the final where she would again play Einarson. Tied in the ninth end, Jones made a long runback to count three, going on to run her opponents out of stones in the tenth end to win the game. This gave the team a berth in the 2021 Canadian Olympic Curling Pre-Trials, along with the $14,000 winner's prize. Back on the Slam tour, the team reached the semifinals of the 2018 National before missing the playoffs at the 2019 Canadian Open in the new year. This was a minor setback for the team, however, as the next month they defeated Tracy Fleury in the final of the 2019 TSN All-Star Curling Skins Game, taking home $51,000 in winnings and giving Jones her third straight Skins title.

As defending Canadian champions, Team Jones automatically qualified for the 2019 Scotties Tournament of Hearts as Team Canada. Despite entering as the second ranked team, they struggled to find consistency, losing to both Prince Edward Island and New Brunswick in the round robin and later Ontario and Northern Ontario in the championship pool. An additional loss to Wild Card's Casey Scheidegger put the team out of contention with a 6–5 record, the first time Jones had missed the playoffs at the Hearts in her fourteen appearances. To finish off the tour season, the team lost consecutive quarterfinals once again at the 2019 Players' Championship and 2019 Champions Cup. In May 2019, Jones was invited to represent Team Canada (in lieu of a pregnant Rachel Homan, who had previously qualified) in the Grand Final of the inaugural Curling World Cup. Jones and her composite rink of Kaitlyn Lawes, Shannon Birchard and Jill Officer won the event, defeating the World Champion Silvana Tirinzoni rink from Switzerland in the final.

In their first event of the 2019–20 season, Team Jones won the 2019 AMJ Campbell Shorty Jenkins Classic, defeating Tracy Fleury in the final. Next, they played in the 2019 Colonial Square Ladies Classic, where Fleury would take them out in the semifinals. To begin the Slam season, they had two quarterfinal finishes at the 2019 Masters and the 2019 Tour Challenge. The team struggled at the 2019 Canada Cup, finishing with a 2–4 record and failing to defend their title. In their last event before the new year, they made it to the final of the 2019 National where they lost to Anna Hasselborg.

At the 2020 Canadian Open, Team Jones lost twice to Russia's Alina Kovaleva, with the second loss knocking them out in the quarterfinals. Next was the 2020 Manitoba Scotties Tournament of Hearts where the team reached the final before losing 8–6 to Team Einarson. However, by virtue of their CTRS ranking, the team had a second chance to qualify for the 2020 Scotties Tournament of Hearts through the wild card play-in game, where they defeated Team Fleury to become Team Wild Card. At the Scotties, they finished the round robin and championship pool with a 9–2 record, qualifying for the playoffs. They then lost to Kerri Einarson (Team Manitoba) in the 1 vs. 2 playoff game and to Rachel Homan (Team Ontario) in the semifinal to finish in third place. It would be their last event of the season as both the Players' Championship and the Champions Cup Grand Slam events were cancelled due to the COVID-19 pandemic. On March 18, 2020, the team announced that Lisa Weagle, after parting ways with Team Homan, would join the team in a 5-player rotation.

=== 2020–21 ===
After losing in the semifinal of the 2020 Scotties, Jones did not "step foot [sic] on the ice" again until the 2020 Cameron's Brewing Mixed Doubles Cashspiel played in September 2020, due to the COVID pandemic. Jones and partner Brent Laing went undefeated at the event, defeating Maddy Warriner and Charlie Richard in the final. A week later, she won her first women's event of the season at the 2020 Stu Sells Oakville Tankard. The 2021 Manitoba Scotties were cancelled due to the COVID-19 pandemic in Manitoba, so Curl Manitoba appointed the Jones rink to represent Manitoba at the 2021 Scotties Tournament of Hearts. At the 2021 Hearts, Jones led Manitoba to a 9–3 record, putting them in a third place tiebreaker match against Alberta, skipped by Laura Walker. Walker defeated Jones 9–8 to advance to the semifinal. During the round robin of the tournament, Jones marked her 153rd career win at the Canadian women's curling championship, defeating Sarah Hill 6–5. This win set a record for the most career wins at the championship in history.

A month later, Jones was back in the bubble to compete with Brent Laing at the 2021 Canadian Mixed Doubles Curling Championship. After going through the round robin with a 5–1 record, the pair lost in the round of 8 to eventual champions Kerri Einarson and Brad Gushue, eliminating them from contention. Jones ended her season with her women's team at the only two Grand Slam events of the abbreviated season, also held in the Calgary bubble. Her team missed the playoffs at both the 2021 Champions Cup and the 2021 Players' Championship.

=== 2021–22 ===
Team Jones qualified for the playoffs in each of their first four tour events; however, they were not able to qualify for any finals. At the first Grand Slam of the season, the 2021 Masters, the team was able to reach the final before losing to Tracy Fleury in a 9–7 match. They then missed the playoffs at the 2021 National two weeks later.

A month later, Team Jones competed in the 2021 Canadian Olympic Curling Trials. There, the team posted a 5–3 round robin record, earning a spot in the semifinal. They then defeated Krista McCarville to qualify for the final, where they would face Fleury again. After a tight game all the way through, Team Fleury stole one in the ninth end to take a single-point lead. In the tenth end, Jones had an open hit-and-stick to win the game; however, her shooter rolled too far, and she only got one. This sent the game to an extra end. On her final shot, Fleury attempted a soft-weight hit on a Jones stone partially buried behind a guard. Her rock, however, curled too much and hit the guard, giving up a steal of one and the game to Team Jones. After the game, Jones said that "we're there to pick each other up when you miss, not everybody can say that and that's really a big strength of our team." With the win, Team Jones travelled to Beijing, China to represent Canada at the 2022 Winter Olympics. Jones, at 47, was the oldest Canadian athlete on the team for the Games. Through the round robin, the Canadian team had mixed results, ultimately finishing tied for third with a 5–4 record. However, because of their draw shot challenge results, which were the lowest of the teams they were tied with, they ranked fifth overall, missing the playoffs. After their final game, an emotional Jones said, "I can tell everybody at home that we tried our very best, we're really sorry we don't get to play again, but we tried our hardest."

On March 15, 2022, Team Jones announced they would be parting ways after the 2021–22 season. Lead Dawn McEwen announced she would be retiring from competitive curling, while third Kaitlyn Lawes and second Jocelyn Peterman announced they would be joining Selena Njegovan and Kristin MacCuish of Team Fleury to form a new team. Additionally, alternate Lisa Weagle stated she would focus solely on mixed doubles. A few days later, on March 17, 2022, Jones announced that she would be teaming up with Team Mackenzie Zacharias for the 2022–23 season. Jones would take over the team as skip, with the four Zacharias members each moving down one position in the lineup.

Team Jones still had two more events together before parting ways, the 2022 Players' Championship and 2022 Champions Cup Grand Slams. At the Players', the team went 1–3, missing the playoffs. They then missed the playoffs again at the Champions Cup with a 1–4 record, ending the team's run together.

=== 2022–23 ===
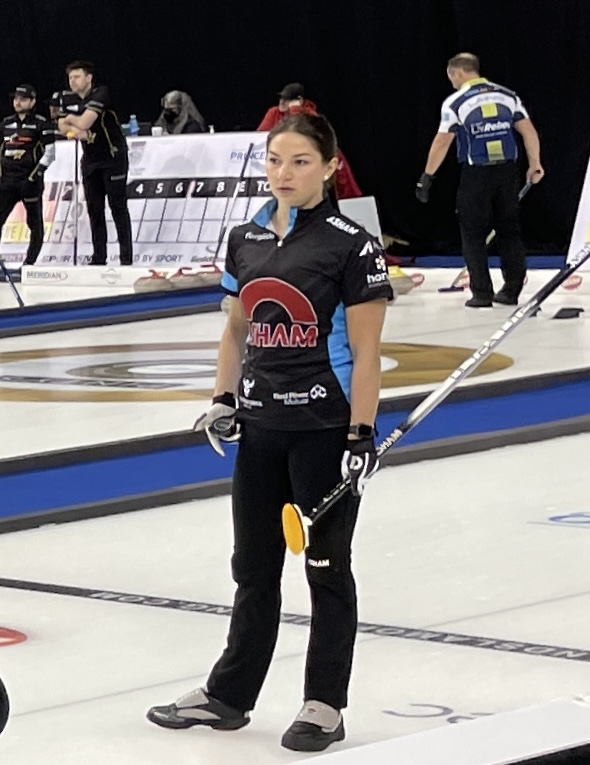
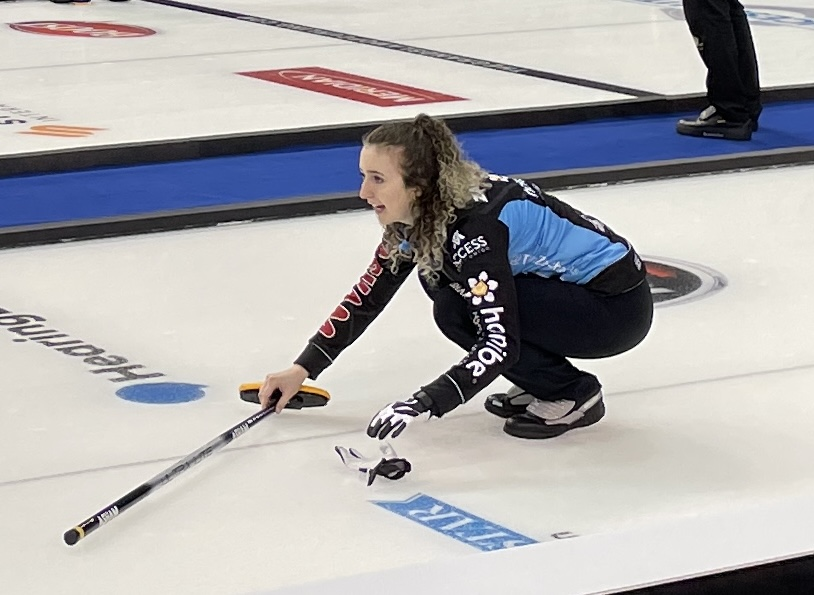
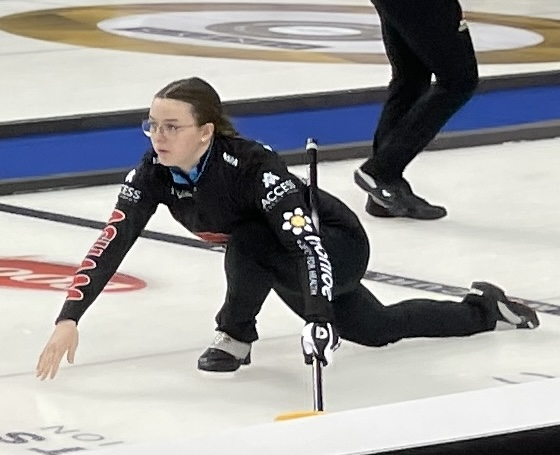
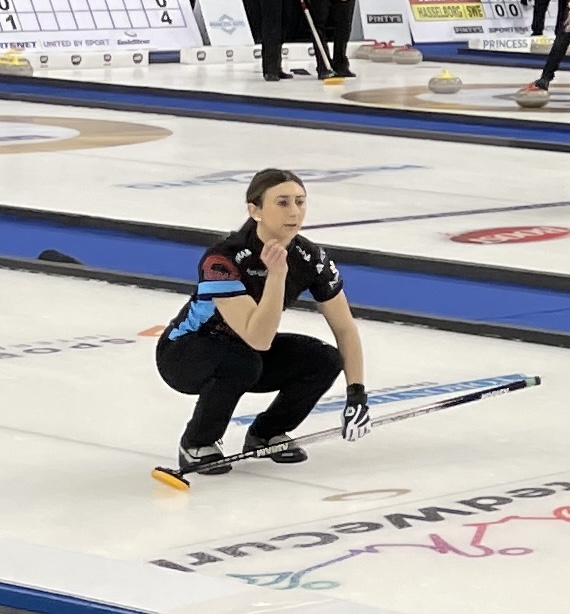
From left to right: Jones' new teammates Karlee Burgess, Mackenzie Zacharias, Lauren Lenentine, and Emily Zacharias.

The newly revised Jones lineup with third Karlee Burgess, second Mackenzie Zacharias, lead Lauren Lenentine and alternate Emily Zacharias found immediate success on tour, winning the 2022 Saville Shoot-Out after an undefeated run. The team then competed in the 2022 PointsBet Invitational single elimination event where they won all four of their games to claim the title. They had three semifinal finishes in a row at the 2022 Curlers Corner Autumn Gold Curling Classic, 2022 Stu Sells 1824 Halifax Classic and the DeKalb Superspiel, losing to Michèle Jäggi, Christina Black and Nancy Martin respectively. At the 2023 Manitoba Scotties Tournament of Hearts, Team Jones went undefeated to win their first provincial title as a new squad. This qualified the team for the 2023 Scotties Tournament of Hearts where after an opening draw loss, they went on a ten game winning streak to qualify for the final where they faced the three-time defending champions in Team Kerri Einarson. Tied 2–2 in the fifth, Jones pulled up light on her final draw which gave Team Canada a steal of two. In the ninth, she missed a pivotal freeze which left Einarson with an open hit to count five to secure the win. In Grand Slam play, Team Jones reached the playoffs in four of six events but never made it past the quarterfinal round.

On the mixed doubles tour, Jones and Laing went undefeated to win the Goldline Valleyfield Mixed Doubles event in Quebec. At the 2023 Canadian Mixed Doubles Curling Championship, the pair went undefeated through the round robin with a 7–0 record. They then defeated Lisa Weagle and John Epping in the quarterfinals and Rachel Homan and Tyler Tardi in the semifinals to qualify for the championship game. There, tied in the eighth end, they scored five to down Jocelyn Peterman and Brett Gallant 9–4, securing the national title. This qualified the pair for the 2023 World Mixed Doubles Curling Championship where they finished first through their pool with an 8–1 record, earning a bye to the semifinal. They then lost both the semifinal and bronze medal game to the United States and Norway respectively, finishing fourth.

=== 2023–24 ===
Team Jones had a strong start to the 2023–24 season, finishing second at the 2023 Saville Shootout after losing to Heather Nedohin (skipping Team Homan) in the final. Jones did not play with the team for the event, however, being replaced by Chelsea Carey. At the 2023 PointsBet Invitational, they could not defend their title, losing in the quarterfinal round to Christina Black. In October, the team played in the first Slam of the season, the 2023 Tour Challenge, where they qualified for the playoffs with a 2–2 record. They then upset the higher seeded Silvana Tirinzoni and Anna Hasselborg rinks in the quarters and semis to reach their first Slam final as a team. Facing Jones' former teammate Kaitlyn Lawes, the team won the game 7–4, giving Jones' her seventeenth career Slam. In their next event, Carey substituted for Jones again and led the team to another second-place finish at the Stu Sells 1824 Halifax Classic, losing to Tirinzoni in the final. At the next three Slams, the team had two semifinal finishes and one quarterfinal appearance.

New qualifying rules for the Scotties Tournament of Hearts allowed Team Jones a pre-qualifying spot at the 2024 Scotties Tournament of Hearts without having to play in the 2024 playdowns. Days before the event began, Jones announced that at the conclusion of the season she would be retiring from four person curling, marking the end of one of the most historic careers in Canadian women's curling. In her last Hearts, Jones led her team to a 6–2 round robin record, followed by a championship round victory over Alberta. After dropping the 1 vs. 2 game to Rachel Homan, they defeated Kate Cameron in the semifinal to advance to their second straight Scotties final. After Jones got two in the tenth to tie the game at four all, Homan counted one in an extra end for the 5–4 victory. In their final event, Team Jones went 1–4 at the 2024 Players' Championship. Chelsea Carey took over Jones' rink full-time for the 2024–25 season. In April 2024, it was announced that Jones, along with John Morris and Jared Allen, were part of a sports business venture, The Curling Group, which purchased ownership and operations of the Grand Slam of Curling from Sportsnet.

=== Coaching ===
In February 2025, it was announced that Jones would be coaching the Rachel Homan rink at the 2025 Scotties Tournament of Hearts.

== Year-by-year statistics ==
=== Team events ===
Year	Team	Position	Event	Finish	Record	Pct. (Note: Round robin only)
1990	Jones	Skip	Manitoba Juniors	DNQ	1–2	–
1991	Staub (CCC)	Third	Manitoba Juniors	1st		–
1991	Manitoba (Staub)	Third	Canadian Juniors	2nd	11–1	74
1992	Jones	Skip	Manitoba Juniors	2nd		–
1993	Jones	Skip	Manitoba Juniors	1st		–
1993	Manitoba (Jones)	Skip	Canadian Juniors	5th	8–4	68
1994	Jones	Skip	Manitoba Juniors	1st	6–0	–
1994	Manitoba (Jones)	Skip	Canadian Juniors	1st	11–4	70
1995	Jones (SVCC)	Skip	Manitoba Juniors	2nd		–
1995	Canada (Jones)	Skip	Canadian Juniors	T3rd	0–1	53 (Note: Percentage for semifinal only, as this is the only game that Team Canada played in.)
1999	Porritt (SVCC)	Third	Manitoba STOH	DNQ	3–2	–
2001	Jones (SVCC)	Skip	Manitoba STOH	2nd		–
2002	Jones (SVCC)	Skip	Manitoba STOH	1st		–
2002	Manitoba (Jones)	Skip	2002 STOH	4th	8–4	79
2003	Jones (SVCC)	Skip	Manitoba STOH	2nd	6–3	–
2004	Jones (SVCC)	Skip	Canada Cup	T8th	1–3	70
2004	Jones (SVCC)	Skip	Manitoba STOH	4th	6–2	–
2005	Jones (SVCC)	Skip	Manitoba STOH	1st	10–1	–
2005	Manitoba (Jones)	Skip	2005 STOH	1st	11–2	80
2005	Canada (Jones)	Skip	2005 WCC	4th	8–4	68
2005	Jones	Skip	2005 COCT	6th	5–4	73
2006	Jones (SVCC)	Skip	Canada Cup	2nd	6–3	75
2006	Team Canada (Jones)	Skip	2006 STOH	2nd	10–4	70
2007	Jones (SVCC)	Skip	Manitoba STOH	1st	9–2	–
2007	Manitoba (Jones)	Skip	2007 STOH	3rd	10–3	76
2007	Jones (SVCC)	Skip	Canada Cup	1st	6–2	73
2007	North America	Skip	Cont'l Cup	1st	1–1–0	
2008	Jones (SVCC)	Skip	Manitoba STOH	1st	8–2	–
2008	Manitoba (Jones)	Skip	2008 STOH	1st	11–4	76
2008	Jones (SVCC)	Skip	Canada Cup	4th	4–2	78
2008	Canada (Jones)	Skip	2008 WCC	1st	11–3	82
2008	North America	Skip	Cont'l Cup	2nd	0–2–1	
2009	Team Canada (Jones)	Skip	2009 STOH	1st	11–4	78
2009	Canada (Jones)	Skip	2009 WCC	4th	9–4	81
2009	Jones	Skip	2009 COCT	6th	2–5	76
2010	Team Canada (Jones)	Skip	2010 STOH	1st	10–3	76
2010	Canada (Jones)	Skip	2010 WCC	3rd	11–3	85
2010	Jones (SVCC)	Skip	Canada Cup	5th	3–2	75
2011	North America	Skip	Cont'l Cup	1st	3–0	73
2011	Team Canada (Jones)	Skip	2011 STOH	2nd	9–4	83
2011	Jones (SVCC)	Skip	Canada Cup	1st	5–3	75
2012	Jones (SVCC)	Skip	Manitoba STOH	1st	9–2	–
2012	Manitoba (Jones)	Skip	2012 STOH	3rd	10–4	83
2013	North America	Skip	Cont'l Cup	1st	3–0–1	78
2013	Jones (SVCC)	Skip	Manitoba STOH	1st	8–1	–
2013	Manitoba (Jones)	Skip	2013 STOH	2nd	12–2	86
2013	Jones	Skip	2013 COCT	1st	7–1	84
2014	North America	Skip	Cont'l Cup	1st	2–2	83
2014	Canada (Jones)	Skip	OG	1st	11–0	86
2014	Jones (SVCC)	Skip	Canada Cup	4th	3–3	74
2015	Canada	Skip	Cont'l Cup	1st	1–1–2	82
2015	Jones (SVCC)	Skip	Manitoba STOH	1st	9–0	–
2015	Manitoba (Jones)	Skip	2015 STOH	1st	12–1	81
2015	Canada (Jones)	Skip	2015 WCC	2nd	10–4	77
2015	Jones (SVCC)	Skip	Canada Cup	3rd	4–3	82
2016	North America	Skip	Cont'l Cup	1st	4–0–0	84
2016	Team Canada (Jones)	Skip	2016 STOH	3rd	10–4	85
2016	Jones (SVCC)	Skip	Canada Cup	1st	6–1	79
2017	North America	Skip	Cont'l Cup	1st	1–2–1	67
2017	Jones (SVCC)	Skip	Manitoba STOH	3rd	7–2	–
2017	Jones	Skip	2017 COCT	3rd	5–4	74
2018	Jones (SVCC)	Skip	Manitoba STOH	1st	8–1	–
2018	Manitoba (Jones)	Skip	2018 STOH	1st	11–2	84
2018	Canada (Jones)	Skip	2018 WCC	1st	14–0	80
2018	Jones (SVCC)	Skip	Canada Cup	1st	7–2	74
2019	North America	Skip	Cont'l Cup	2nd	1–1–1	
2019	Team Canada (Jones)	Skip	2019 STOH	7th	6–5	73
2019	Canada (Jones)	Skip	CWC	1st	5–2	–
2019	Jones (SVCC)	Skip	Canada Cup	6th	2–4	69
2020	Jones (SVCC)	Skip	Manitoba STOH	2nd	6–3	–
2020	Jones (SVCC)	Skip	STOH Wild Card	1st	1–0	74
2020	Wild Card (Jones)	Skip	2020 STOH	3rd	9–4	75
2021	Manitoba (Jones)	Skip	2021 STOH	4th	9–4	79
2021	Jones	Skip	2021 COCT	1st	7–3	75
2022	Canada (Jones)	Skip	OG	5th	5–4	74
2023	Jones (SVCC/ACC)	Skip	Manitoba STOH	1st	9–0	–
2023	Manitoba (Jones)	Skip	2023 STOH	2nd	10–2	81
2024	Manitoba (Jones)	Skip	2024 STOH	2nd	8–4	81
Scotties Tournament of Hearts Totals					177–60	79
World Championship Totals					63–18	79
Olympic Curling Trial Totals					26–17	77
Olympic Games Totals					16–4	81

=== Mixed doubles ===
Year	Partner	Event	Finish	Record	Pct.
2007	Bill Todhunter	Cont'l Cup	1st	1–0–0	91
2008	Marc Kennedy	Cont'l Cup	2nd	0–0–1	
2011	Carter Rycroft	Cont'l Cup	1st	1–0–0	
2013	Brent Laing	Cont'l Cup	1st	1–0–0	73
2014	Mark Nichols	Cont'l Cup	1st	1–0–0	71
2016	Brent Laing	Cont'l Cup	1st	0–1–0	67
2017	Brent Laing	Cont'l Cup	1st	0–1–0	59
2017	Brent Laing	CMDCC	T3rd	7–2	
2018	Mark Nichols	CMDCOT	4th	8–4	73
2018	Brent Laing	CMDCC	T5th	6–3	71
2019	Mark Nichols	Cont'l Cup	2nd	0–1–0	
2019	Brent Laing	CMDCC	T9th	5–3	71
2021	Brent Laing	CMDCC	T5th	5–2	
2023	Brent Laing	CMDCC	1st	10–0	
2023	Brent Laing	2023 WCC	4th	8–3	77
2024	Brent Laing	CMDCC	T18th	3–4	73
2025	Brent Laing	CMDCOT	T5th	4–4	79
World Championship Totals				8–3	77
Olympic Curling Trial Totals				8–4	73

== Grand Slam record ==
Jones has won a career 17 Grand Slam victories since the women's grand slam was introduced in 2006, though the Grand Slam of Curling only recognizes 10 victories of the current day events.

Key
C	Champion
F	Lost in Final
SF	Lost in Semifinal
QF	Lost in Quarterfinals
R16	Lost in the round of 16
Q	Did not advance to playoffs
T2	Played in Tier 2 event
DNP	Did not participate in event
N/A	Not a Grand Slam event that season

Event	2005–06	2006–07	2007–08	2008–09	2009–10	2010–11	2011–12	2012–13 (Note: Jones did not play at the beginning of the 2012–13 season due to her pregnancy. She returned to the team in January, in time for that year's Players' slam.)	2013–14	2014–15	2015–16	2016–17	2017–18	2018–19	2019–20	2020–21	2021–22	2022–23	2023–24
Tour Challenge	N/A	N/A	N/A	N/A	N/A	N/A	N/A	N/A	N/A	N/A	Q	QF	SF	QF	QF	N/A	N/A	Q	C
The National	N/A	N/A	N/A	N/A	N/A	N/A	N/A	N/A	N/A	N/A	QF	Q	C	SF	F	N/A	Q	QF	QF
Masters	N/A	N/A	N/A	N/A	N/A	N/A	N/A	DNP	SF	SF	QF	QF	C	QF	QF	N/A	F	QF	SF
Canadian Open	N/A	N/A	N/A	N/A	N/A	N/A	N/A	N/A	N/A	QF	F	QF	SF	Q	QF	N/A	N/A	QF	SF
Players'	C	C	Q	C	QF	C	SF	SF	C	Q	F	C	F	QF	N/A	Q	Q	Q	Q
Champions Cup	N/A	N/A	N/A	N/A	N/A	N/A	N/A	N/A	N/A	N/A	C	QF	SF	QF	N/A	Q	Q	QF	N/A

=== Former events ===
Event	2006–07	2007–08	2008–09	2009–10	2010–11	2011–12	2012–13	2013–14	2014–15	2015–16	2016–17	2017–18	2018–19
Elite 10	N/A	N/A	N/A	N/A	N/A	N/A	N/A	N/A	N/A	N/A	N/A	N/A	SF
Autumn Gold	Q	C	Q	C	SF	Q	DNP	QF	C	N/A	N/A	N/A	N/A
Colonial Square	N/A	N/A	N/A	N/A	N/A	N/A	DNP	C	DNP	N/A	N/A	N/A	N/A
Manitoba Liquor & Lotteries	F	F	QF	F	QF	QF	DNP	C	N/A	N/A	N/A	N/A	N/A
Sobeys Slam	N/A	Q	Q	N/A	C	N/A	N/A	N/A	N/A	N/A	N/A	N/A	N/A
Wayden Transportation	QF	Q	C	N/A	N/A	N/A	N/A	N/A	N/A	N/A	N/A	N/A	N/A

== Teams ==
Season	Skip	Third	Second	Lead
1989–90	Jennifer Jones	Heather Jones	Tracey Lavery	Dana Malanchuk
1990–91	Jill Staub	Jennifer Jones	Kristie Moroz	Kelly Mackenzie
1992–93	Jennifer Jones	Trisha Baldwin	Jill Officer	Dana Malanchuk
1993–94	Jennifer Jones	Trisha Baldwin	Jill Officer	Dana Malanchuk
1994–95	Jennifer Jones	Trisha Baldwin	Jill Officer	Dana Malanchuk
1996–97	Karen Porritt	Jennifer Jones	Jill Officer	Patti Burtnyk
1997–98	Karen Porritt	Jennifer Jones	Patti Burtnyk	Jill Officer
1998–99	Karen Porritt	Jennifer Jones	Patti Burtnyk	Jill Officer
2000–01	Jennifer Jones	Karen Porritt	Lynn Fallis-Kurz	Dana Allerton
2001–02	Jennifer Jones	Karen Porritt	Lynn Fallis-Kurz	Dana Allerton
2002–03	Jennifer Jones	Kimberly Keizer	Lynn Fallis-Kurz	Dana Allerton
2003–04	Jennifer Jones	Karen Porritt	Jill Officer	Lynn Fallis-Kurz
2004–05	Jennifer Jones	Cathy Overton-Clapham	Jill Officer	Cathy Gauthier
2005–06	Jennifer Jones	Cathy Overton-Clapham	Jill Officer	Georgina Wheatcroft
2006–07	Jennifer Jones	Cathy Overton-Clapham	Jill Officer	Dana Allerton / Janet Arnott / Dawn Askin
2007–08	Jennifer Jones	Cathy Overton-Clapham	Jill Officer	Dawn Askin
2008–09	Jennifer Jones	Cathy Overton-Clapham	Jill Officer	Dawn Askin
2009–10	Jennifer Jones	Cathy Overton-Clapham	Jill Officer	Dawn Askin
2010–11	Jennifer Jones	Kaitlyn Lawes	Jill Officer	Dawn Askin
2011–12	Jennifer Jones	Kaitlyn Lawes	Joëlle Sabourin (Sept–Dec); Jill Officer (Jan–April)	Dawn Askin
2013 (Note: Jones was on maternity leave for the beginning of the 2012–13 curling season and returned to her team in January 2013.)	Jennifer Jones	Kaitlyn Lawes	Jill Officer	Dawn Askin
2013–14	Jennifer Jones	Kaitlyn Lawes	Jill Officer	Dawn McEwen
2014–15	Jennifer Jones	Kaitlyn Lawes	Jill Officer	Dawn McEwen
2015–16	Jennifer Jones	Kaitlyn Lawes	Jill Officer	Jennifer Clark-Rouire (Note: McEwen was on maternity leave at the beginning of the 2015–16 curling season, and she returned to the team in November 2015.) / Dawn McEwen
2016–17	Jennifer Jones	Kaitlyn Lawes	Jill Officer	Dawn McEwen
2017–18	Jennifer Jones	Kaitlyn Lawes; Shannon Birchard (STOH only)	Jill Officer	Dawn McEwen
2018–19	Jennifer Jones	Kaitlyn Lawes	Jocelyn Peterman	Dawn McEwen
2019–20	Jennifer Jones	Kaitlyn Lawes	Jocelyn Peterman	Dawn McEwen
2020–21	Jennifer Jones	Kaitlyn Lawes	Jocelyn Peterman	Dawn McEwen / Lisa Weagle
2021–22	Jennifer Jones	Kaitlyn Lawes	Jocelyn Peterman	Dawn McEwen / Lisa Weagle
2022–23	Jennifer Jones	Karlee Burgess	Mackenzie Zacharias	Emily Zacharias / Lauren Lenentine
2023–24	Jennifer Jones	Karlee Burgess	Emily Zacharias	Lauren Lenentine

== Honours ==
In 2011, Jones was a finalist for the Future Leaders of Manitoba award in the business/professional category. Three years later, she was made a member of the Order of Manitoba. In 2019, Jones was named the greatest Canadian female skip and overall curler in history by The Sports Network (TSN), the main television broadcaster of major curling events, following a poll of broadcasters, reporters and top curlers.

== Memoirs ==
Jones published her autobiography "Rock Star" (Collins publishers), assisted by Bob Weeks, in October 2025.
