= 2015 Continental Cup of Curling =

European-American contest

2015 World Financial Group Continental Cup of Curling
- Host city: Calgary, Alberta
- Arena: Markin MacPhail Centre
- Dates: January 8–11
- Winner: Team Canada
Score Breakdown
Discipline	Canada	Europe
Team Round 1	2	1
Mixed Doubles Round 1	2.5	0.5
Team Round 2	2.5	0.5
Team Round 3	1.5	1.5
Singles	3.5	2.5
Team Round 4	3	0
Mixed Doubles Round 2	2	1
Team Round 5	3	0
Team Round 6	2	1
Skins Round 1	10.5	4.5
Skins Round 2	9.5	5.5
Total	42	18

The 2015 World Financial Group Continental Cup of Curling was held from January 8 to 11 at the Markin MacPhail Centre International Arena in Calgary, Alberta. The Continental Cup featured team events, mixed doubles events, singles competitions, and skins competitions, and the brunt of the points were in the skins competitions. TSN broadcast the event, as it has in previous years.

The total attendance for the event was 22,606. Team Canada collected CAD$52,000 winners cheque and CAD$13,000 skins bonus. Team Europe collected CAD$26,000 losers cheque.

== Competition background ==
In their 2013-2014 Annual Review, the World Curling Federation reported that they can no longer justify further involvement in the Continental Cup, and that the Canadian Curling Association will operate the event starting in 2015.

This edition of the Continental Cup would be the first in which the new system of competing teams would be implemented. It was intended that in this and future editions of the Continental Cup, Team North America would be replaced by an all-Canadian team entry, where team Canada would compete alternatively against Team Europe in odd years and Team World, made up of teams from the United States and non-European curling nations, in even years. However, this format would only last for the 2015 event. In this edition of the Continental Cup, six teams from Canada competed against six teams from Europe.

The same competition format as that of the previous year was used. Out of the sixty total points available, a majority of points would be needed to win the cup. The mixed doubles, singles, and team games were worth one point each, and ties were worth one half point each to both teams. The skins games were worth a total of five points. Six mixed doubles and six singles games were played, along with eighteen team games and six skins games.

== Teams ==
The teams will be selected from the top teams in each region. Six teams from each region will compete against each other in the competition. The teams from Canada earn the right to represent Team Canada by virtue of winning certain events, namely the Canada Cup of Curling and the Canadian National Championships (the Brier and the Tournament of Hearts). The final two teams are the teams who represented Canada at the 2014 Winter Olympics.

For Team Europe, the teams participating include Olympic bronze medallist Eve Muirhead, Olympic silver medallist Margaretha Sigfridsson, world bronze medallist Anna Sidorova, Olympic bronze medallist Niklas Edin, two-time world champion David Murdoch, and two-time European champion Thomas Ulsrud.

Team	Skip	Third	Second	Lead	Locale
Team; Canada	Rachel Homan	Emma Miskew	Joanne Courtney	Lisa Weagle	(Canada) Ottawa, Ontario
Team; Canada	Jennifer Jones	Kaitlyn Lawes	Jill Officer	Dawn McEwen	(Canada) Winnipeg, Manitoba
Team; Canada	Val Sweeting	Lori Olson-Johns	Dana Ferguson	Rachelle Brown	(Canada) Edmonton, Alberta
Team; Canada	Brad Jacobs	Ryan Fry	E. J. Harnden	Ryan Harnden	(Canada) Sault Ste. Marie, Ontario
Team; Canada	John Morris	Pat Simmons	Carter Rycroft	Nolan Thiessen	(Canada) Calgary, Alberta
Team; Canada	Mike McEwen	B. J. Neufeld	Matt Wozniak	Ben Hebert	(Canada) Winnipeg, Manitoba
Team; Canada	Coach: Rick Lang, Captain: Randy Ferbey				
Team; Europe (European Union)	Eve Muirhead	Anna Sloan	Vicki Adams (Note: Wennerström did not play for Sigfridsson in Draw 1, and was substituted by Adams.)	Sarah Reid	(Scotland) Stirling
Team; Europe (European Union)	Anna Sidorova	Margarita Fomina	Alexandra Saitova	Ekaterina Galkina (Note: Wennerström did not play for Sigfridsson in Draw 9 and Draw 10. Sigfridsson skipped at second, and Galkina played lead.)	(Russia) Moscow
Team; Europe (European Union)	Maria Prytz (fourth)	Christina Bertrup	Maria Wennerström	Margaretha Sigfridsson (skip)	(Sweden) Umeå
Team; Europe (European Union)	Niklas Edin	Oskar Eriksson	Kristian Lindström	Christoffer Sundgren	(Sweden) Karlstad
Team; Europe (European Union)	David Murdoch	Greg Drummond	Scott Andrews	Michael Goodfellow	(Scotland) Stirling
Team; Europe (European Union)	Thomas Ulsrud	Torger Nergård	Christoffer Svae	Håvard Vad Petersson	(Norway) Oslo
Team; Europe (European Union)	Coach: (Scotland) David Hay, Captain: (Sweden) Peja Lindholm				

== Events ==
All times listed are in Mountain Standard Time (UTC−7). The draws for Thursday, Friday, and Saturday were released on Wednesday night, and the draws for Sunday were released on Saturday afternoon.

=== Thursday, January 8 ===
==== Draw 1 ====
Team 8:30 am

Sheet A	1	2	3	4	5	6	7	8	Final	Points
Canada (Sweeting)	0	0	0	1	0	0	2	X	3	0
Europe (Sidorova) 🔨	1	1	2	0	2	1	0	X	7	1

Sheet B	1	2	3	4	5	6	7	8	Final	Points
Canada (Jacobs) 🔨	0	1	0	0	1	1	0	1	4	1
Europe (Edin)	0	0	1	0	0	0	0	0	1	0

Sheet C	1	2	3	4	5	6	7	8	Final	Points
Canada (Homan) 🔨	0	2	0	0	0	1	1	3	7	1
Europe (Sigfridsson)	0	0	0	1	1	0	0	0	2	0

==== Draw 2 ====
Mixed doubles 1:30 pm

Sheet A	1	2	3	4	5	6	7	8	Final	Points
Europe (Eriksson/Galkina)	0	1	0	0	0	1	1	0	3	0
Canada (Rycroft/Olson-Johns)	3	0	4	1	1	0	0	1	10	1

Sheet B	1	2	3	4	5	6	7	8	Final	Points
Europe (Edin/Sidorova)	0	0	0	3	0	1	0	2	6	0
Canada (Miskew/Fry)	1	2	1	0	2	0	3	0	9	1

Sheet C	1	2	3	4	5	6	7	8	Final	Points
Europe (Prytz/Nergård)	0	0	1	0	1	0	3	0	5	½
Canada (Homan/E. Harnden)	1	1	0	1	0	1	0	1	5	½

==== Draw 3 ====
Team 6:30 pm

Sheet A	1	2	3	4	5	6	7	8	Final	Points
Canada (Morris) 🔨	2	0	1	0	1	2	0	X	6	1
Europe (Ulsrud)	0	1	0	1	0	0	1	X	3	0

Sheet B	1	2	3	4	5	6	7	8	Final	Points
Canada (Jones) 🔨	1	0	2	0	0	1	0	0	4	½
Europe (Muirhead)	0	1	0	1	1	0	0	1	4	½

Sheet C	1	2	3	4	5	6	7	8	Final	Points
Canada (McEwen)	1	0	2	0	1	0	1	0	5	1
Europe (Murdoch) 🔨	0	1	0	1	0	1	0	1	4	0

=== Friday, January 9 ===
==== Draw 4 ====
Team 8:30 am

Sheet A	1	2	3	4	5	6	7	8	Final	Points
Canada (Jones)	0	2	0	1	0	1	0	X	4	0
Europe (Sigfridsson) 🔨	5	0	2	0	1	0	1	X	9	1

Sheet B	1	2	3	4	5	6	7	8	Final	Points
Canada (McEwen) 🔨	0	2	0	2	0	0	3	X	7	1
Europe (Ulsrud)	0	0	1	0	1	0	0	X	2	0

Sheet C	1	2	3	4	5	6	7	8	Final	Points
Canada (Sweeting)	0	0	2	0	0	1	0	1	4	½
Europe (Muirhead) 🔨	0	1	0	1	1	0	1	0	4	½

==== Draw 5 ====
Singles 1:30 pm

Sheet A	Runthrough	Button	Port	Raise	Hit-and-Roll	Double	Total	Points
Canada (Sweeting)	0	5	5	4	5	0	19	1
Europe (Sigfridsson)	0	5	3	5	2	1	16	0

Sheet B	Runthrough	Button	Port	Raise	Hit-and-Roll	Double	Total	Points
Canada (Homan)	0	5	5	5	1	4	20	1
Europe (Sidorova)	0	3	2	4	1	1	11	0

Sheet C	Runthrough	Button	Port	Raise	Hit-and-Roll	Double	Total	Points
Canada (Jones)	3	3	5	3	1	5	20	1
Europe (Muirhead)	0	4	4	3	0	3	14	0

Sheet A	Runthrough	Button	Port	Raise	Hit-and-Roll	Double	Total	Points
Canada (Morris)	0	3	0	5	5	0	13	0
Europe (Murdoch)	5	3	5	3	5	0	21	1

Sheet B	Runthrough	Button	Port	Raise	Hit-and-Roll	Double	Total	Points
Canada (McEwen)	0	5	5	5	4	3	22	0
Europe (Ulsrud)	5	4	4	5	5	0	23	1

Sheet C	Runthrough	Button	Port	Raise	Hit-and-Roll	Double	Total	Points
Canada (Jacobs)	0	3	5	4	1	3	16	0.5
Europe (Edin)	5	3	5	0	3	0	16	0.5

==== Draw 6 ====
Team 6:30 pm

Sheet A	1	2	3	4	5	6	7	8	Final	Points
Canada (Jacobs) 🔨	0	2	0	1	0	3	0	0	6	1
Europe (Murdoch)	0	0	0	0	1	0	2	2	5	0

Sheet B	1	2	3	4	5	6	7	8	Final	Points
Canada (Homan) 🔨	0	0	1	0	2	0	0	1	4	1
Europe (Sidorova)	0	1	0	1	0	1	0	0	3	0

Sheet C	1	2	3	4	5	6	7	8	Final	Points
Canada (Morris)	1	3	0	2	0	2	0	X	8	1
Europe (Edin) 🔨	0	0	1	0	1	0	1	X	3	0

=== Saturday, January 10 ===
==== Draw 7 ====
Mixed doubles 10:00 am

Sheet A	1	2	3	4	5	6	7	8	Final	Points
Europe (Andrews/Sigfridsson)	1	1	0	0	0	0	0	1	3	0
Canada (Wozniak/Sweeting)	0	0	4	1	1	1	1	0	8	1

Sheet B	1	2	3	4	5	6	7	8	Final	Points
Europe (Sloan/Svae)	0	0	2	4	0	0	0	1	7	1
Canada (D. McEwen/M. McEwen)	1	1	0	0	2	1	1	0	6	0

Sheet C	1	2	3	4	5	6	7	8	Final	Points
Europe (Muirhead/Murdoch)	0	0	0	3	1	0	1	0	5	0
Canada (Lawes/Morris)	1	2	2	0	0	1	0	2	8	1

==== Draw 8 ====
Team 2:00 pm

Sheet A	1	2	3	4	5	6	7	8	Final	Points
Canada (Homan) 🔨	0	1	3	0	1	0	0	1	6	1
Europe (Muirhead)	0	0	0	2	0	1	2	0	5	0

Sheet B	1	2	3	4	5	6	7	8	Final	Points
Canada (Morris) 🔨	2	0	0	0	2	1	2	X	7	1
Europe (Murdoch)	0	3	1	1	0	0	0	X	5	0

Sheet C	1	2	3	4	5	6	7	8	Final	Points
Canada (Jones)	0	1	2	1	0	1	1	1	7	1
Europe (Sidorova) 🔨	2	0	0	0	1	0	0	0	3	0

==== Draw 9 ====
Team 6:30 pm

Sheet A	1	2	3	4	5	6	7	8	Final	Points
Canada (McEwen)	0	2	0	2	2	1	0	X	7	1
Europe (Edin)🔨	1	0	1	0	0	0	2	X	4	0

Sheet B	1	2	3	4	5	6	7	8	Final	Points
Canada (Sweeting) 🔨	0	2	0	3	1	1	0	X	7	1
Europe (Sigfridsson)	0	0	1	0	0	0	1	X	2	0

Sheet C	1	2	3	4	5	6	7	8	Final	Points
Canada (Jacobs)	0	0	1	0	1	1	0	X	3	0
Europe (Ulsrud) 🔨	1	3	0	3	0	0	1	X	8	1

=== Sunday, January 11 ===
==== Draw 10 ====
Skins 11:30 am

Values (points)	½	½	½	½	½	½	1	1	5
Sheet A	1	2	3	4	5	6	7	8	Total
Europe (Sigfridsson)		0		0		X	X		1½
Canada (Homan) 🔨	X		0		X			X	3½

Values (points)	½	½	½	½	½	½	1	1		5
Sheet B	1	2	3	4	5	6	7	8	Button	Total
Europe (Nergård/Sidorova/Petersson/Saitova) 🔨	0		0			X		0	X	1½
Canada (Simmons/Olson-Johns/Rycroft/Brown)		X		X	X		X			3½

Values (points)	½	½	½	½	½	½	1	1	5
Sheet C	1	2	3	4	5	6	7	8	Total
Europe (Edin)	X			0				X	1½
Canada (McEwen) 🔨		X	X		X	X	X		3½

==== Draw 11 ====
Skins 6:30 pm

Values (points)	½	½	½	½	½	½	1	1	5
Sheet A	1	2	3	4	5	6	7	8	Total
Europe (Murdoch)			0	X		0			1
Canada (Jacobs) 🔨	X	X			0		X	X	4

Values (points)	½	½	½	½	½	½	1	1	5
Sheet B	1	2	3	4	5	6	7	8	Total
Europe (Ulsrud/Fomina/Svae/Galkina) 🔨	X	X					X		2
Canada (Morris/Sweeting/Thiessen/Ferguson)			X	X	X	X		X	3

Values (points)	½	½	½	½	½	½	1	1	5
Sheet C	1	2	3	4	5	6	7	8	Total
Europe (Muirhead) 🔨				X			X	X	2½
Canada (Jones)	X	X	X		X	X			2½

== Statistics ==
The statistics for team play, including team skins play, are listed below. The percentages are calculated for each player by rating their shots in each game. Each shot the player attempts is scored out of four based on how well the shot is made.

=== Player percentages ===
==== Men ====
Leads	%
(Scotland) Michael Goodfellow	88
(Canada) Ryan Harnden	86
(Sweden) Christoffer Sundgren	85
(Canada) Ben Hebert	85
(Canada) Nolan Thiessen	83
(Norway) Håvard Vad Petersson	76

Seconds	%
(Canada) E. J. Harnden	87
(Canada) Matt Wozniak	86
(Canada) Carter Rycroft	83
(Norway) Christoffer Svae	81
(Scotland) Scott Andrews	83
(Sweden) Kristian Lindström	78

Thirds	%
(Canada) B. J. Neufeld	85
(Sweden) Oskar Eriksson	85
(Scotland) Greg Drummond	84
(Canada) Ryan Fry	83
(Canada) Pat Simmons	81
(Norway) Torger Nergård	75

Skips	%
(Canada) Mike McEwen	84
(Canada) John Morris	82
(Norway) Thomas Ulsrud	80
(Canada) Brad Jacobs	78
(Scotland) David Murdoch	67
(Sweden) Niklas Edin	66

==== Women ====
Leads	%
(Canada) Dawn McEwen	90
(Russia) Ekaterina Galkina	85
(Canada) Rachelle Brown	81
(Scotland) Sarah Reid	80
(Canada) Lisa Weagle	77
(Sweden) Margaretha Sigfridsson	75

Seconds	%
(Canada) Joanne Courtney	88
(Russia) Alexandra Saitova	83
(Canada) Dana Ferguson	77
(Scotland) Vicki Adams	76
(Canada) Jill Officer	74
(Sweden) Maria Wennerström	68

Thirds	%
(Russia) Margarita Fomina	83
(Canada) Emma Miskew	83
(Canada) Lori Olson-Johns	80
(Sweden) Christina Bertrup	79
(Canada) Kaitlyn Lawes	75
(Scotland) Anna Sloan	71

Skips	%
(Canada) Jennifer Jones	82
(Canada) Rachel Homan	80
(Canada) Val Sweeting	80
(Russia) Anna Sidorova	77
(Sweden) Maria Prytz	76
(Scotland) Eve Muirhead	70

=== Team percentages ===
==== Men ====
Team	%
(Canada) Mike McEwen	85
(Canada) Brad Jacobs	84
(Canada) John Morris	82
(Scotland) David Murdoch	85
(Sweden) Niklas Edin	78
(Norway) Thomas Ulsrud	78

==== Women ====
Team	%
(Canada) Rachel Homan	82
(Russia) Anna Sidorova	81
(Canada) Jennifer Jones	80
(Canada) Val Sweeting	79
(Sweden) Margaretha Sigfridsson	78
(Scotland) Eve Muirhead	74
