= 2007 Casino Rama Curling Skins Game =

The 2007 Casino Rama Curling Skins Game on TSN was held on December 8 and 9 at the Casino Rama Entertainment Centre in Rama, Ontario. It was the first TSN Skins Game put on since it was put on hiatus in 2004. The total purse for the event was CAD$100,000.

Four teams were invited to participate. They played one semi-final each on December 8, and the winners played in the final on December 9. All three games were shown on TSN and TSN-HD. Kevin Martin's team was the big winner, taking home $61,000.

== Teams ==
=== Team Gushue ===
St. John's Curling Club, St. John's, Newfoundland and Labrador

- Skip: Brad Gushue
- Third: Mark Nichols
- Second: Chris Schille
- Lead: David Noftall

=== Team Howard ===
Coldwater and District Curling Club, Coldwater, Ontario

- Skip: Glenn Howard
- Third: Richard Hart
- Second: Brent Laing
- Lead: Craig Savill

=== Team Martin ===
Saville Sports Centre, Edmonton, Alberta

- Skip: Kevin Martin
- Third: John Morris
- Second: Marc Kennedy
- Lead: Ben Hebert

=== Team Middaugh ===
St. George's Golf and Country Club, Toronto, Ontario

- Skip: Wayne Middaugh
- Third: Jon Mead
- Second: Ian Tetley
- Lead: Scott Bailey

== Draw to the button ==
Team Martin won the draw to the button contest to determine seeding. This awarded them an extra $1000.

== Games ==
Semi-final dollar amounts

- 1st & 2nd end: $1000
- 3rd & 4th end: $1500
- 5th end: $2000
- 6th end: $3000
- 7th end: $4500
- 8th end: $6500

=== Middaugh vs. Howard ===
December 8, 1:00pm EST

Team	1	2	3	4	5	6	7	8	Final
Howard	$	-	$	$	-	-	-	-	$4000
Middaugh	-	$	-	-	-	$	$	$	$17000

=== Martin vs. Gushue ===
December 8, 7:00pm EST

Team	1	2	3	4	5	6	7	8	*	Final
Gushue	-	-	$	-	$	-	-	-	-	$6000
Martin	$	-	-	-	-	-	-	-	$	$15000

* - Draw to the button

=== Final ===
December 9, 1:00pm EST

Final game dollar amounts

- 1st & 2nd end: $2000
- 3rd & 4th end: $3000
- 5th end: $4000
- 6th end: $6000
- 7th end: $9000
- 8th end: $13000

+ $15000 bonus for the winner

Team	1	2	3	4	5	6	7	8	Final
Martin	$	-	-	-	-	$	$	$	$45000
Middaugh	-	$	$	$	$	-	-	-	$12000

== Total winnings ==
- Team Martin: $61,000
- Team Middaugh: $29,000
- Team Gushue: $6,000
- Team Howard: $4,000
- Total Purse: $100,000

Preceded by 2004	2007 Casino Rama Curling Skins Game; December 8–9	Succeeded by 2009
