= 2017 Continental Cup of Curling =

Winter sport event held in Nevada

2017 World Financial Group Continental Cup of Curling
- Host city: Paradise, Nevada
- Arena: Orleans Arena
- Dates: January 12–15
- Winner: Team North America
Score Breakdown
Discipline	NA	World
Team Round 1	0.5	2.5
Mixed Doubles Round 1	2	1
Team Round 2	2	1
Team Round 3	2	1
Mixed Doubles Round 2	2	1
Team Round 4	1.5	1.5
Mixed Doubles Round 3	4	2
Team Round 5	3	0
Team Round 6	2	1
Skins Round 1	8	7
Skins Round 2	10	5
Total	37	23

The 2017 World Financial Group Continental Cup of Curling was held from January 12 to 15 at the Orleans Arena in Paradise, Nevada. This marked the third edition of the Continental Cup held outside of Canada. The Continental Cup featured team events, mixed doubles events, and skins competitions, and the brunt of the points was in the skins competitions. TSN broadcast the event, as it had in previous years.

North America would go on to win the event 37 points to 23. The total attendance for the event was 57,753, the second highest in event history.

== Competition format ==
This edition of the Continental Cup used a similar format as that of the previous year, with the main difference being the elimination of the singles event, which was replaced by an additional mixed doubles event. Out of the sixty total points available, a majority of points was needed to win the cup. The mixed doubles, and team games were worth one point each, and ties were worth one half point each to both teams. The skins games were worth a total of five points. Nine mixed doubles were played, along with eighteen team games and six skins games.

== Teams ==
The teams were selected from the top teams in each region. Six teams from each region will compete against each other in the competition. Four teams from Canada earn the right to represent Team North America by virtue of winning certain events, namely the Canada Cup of Curling and the Canadian National Championships (the Brier and the Tournament of Hearts). Two teams from the United States, namely the top point-getters of American teams on the World Curling Tour, were chosen to represent North America, and the teams representing Team World were selected by the World Curling Federation.

The teams in the table below have been announced as representatives of their respective regions.

Team	Skip	Third	Second	Lead	Locale
Team; North; America	Jamie Sinclair	Alex Carlson	Vicky Persinger	Monica Walker	(United States) Blaine, Minnesota
Team; North; America	Jennifer Jones	Kaitlyn Lawes	Jill Officer	Dawn McEwen	(Canada) Winnipeg, Manitoba
Team; North; America	Chelsea Carey	Amy Nixon	Jocelyn Peterman	Laine Peters	(Canada) Calgary, Alberta
Team; North; America	Kevin Koe	Marc Kennedy	Brent Laing	Ben Hebert	(Canada) Calgary, Alberta
Team; North; America	Reid Carruthers	Braeden Moskowy	Derek Samagalski	Colin Hodgson	(Canada) Winnipeg, Manitoba
Team; North; America	Heath McCormick	Chris Plys	Korey Dropkin	Tom Howell	(United States) Blaine, Minnesota
Team; North; America	Coach: (Canada) Rick Lang, Captain: (United States) Debbie McCormick				
Team; World	Binia Feltscher	Irene Schori	Franziska Kaufmann	Christine Urech	(Switzerland) Flims
Team; World	Anna Hasselborg	Sara McManus	Agnes Knochenhauer	Sofia Mabergs	(Sweden) Sundbyberg
Team; World	Niklas Edin	Oskar Eriksson	Rasmus Wranå	Christoffer Sundgren	(Sweden) Karlstad
Team; World	Satsuki Fujisawa	Mari Motohashi	Chinami Yoshida	Yurika Yoshida	(Japan) Kitami
Team; World	Thomas Ulsrud	Torger Nergård	Christoffer Svae	Håvard Vad Petersson	(Norway) Oslo
Team; World	Rasmus Stjerne	Johnny Frederiksen	Oliver Dupont	Troels Harry	(Denmark) Hvidovre
Team; World	Coach: (Norway) Pål Trulsen, Captain: (Germany) Andy Kapp				

== Events ==
All times listed are in Pacific Standard Time (UTC−8).

=== Thursday, January 12 ===
==== Draw 1 ====
Team 9:00 am

Sheet A	1	2	3	4	5	6	7	8	Final	Points
North America (Sinclair)	0	0	2	0	1	0	1	0	4	0
World (Hasselborg) 🔨	0	3	0	0	0	2	0	1	6	1

Sheet B	1	2	3	4	5	6	7	8	Final	Points
North America (Koe) 🔨	0	2	0	0	0	1	0	2	5	0.5
World (Ulsrud)	1	0	1	1	1	0	1	0	5	0.5

Sheet C	1	2	3	4	5	6	7	8	Final	Points
North America (Jones) 🔨	0	2	0	0	0	1	0	X	3	0
World (Feltscher)	0	0	0	2	1	0	2	X	5	1

==== Draw 2 ====
Mixed doubles 1:30 pm

Sheet A	1	2	3	4	5	6	7	8	Final	Points
North America (Sinclair/Dropkin)	0	0	0	0	2	0	0	X	2	0
World (Hasselborg/Eriksson) 🔨	2	1	1	1	0	3	1	X	9	1

Sheet B	1	2	3	4	5	6	7	8	Final	Points
North America (McEwen/Hebert)	3	0	4	1	2	0	0	X	10	1
World (Y. Yoshida/Ulsrud) 🔨	0	1	0	0	0	3	1	X	5	0

Sheet C	1	2	3	4	5	6	7	8	Final	Points
North America (Lawes/Kennedy)	3	2	0	1	2	0	3	X	11	1
World (Urech/Stjerne) 🔨	0	0	1	0	0	3	0	X	4	0

==== Draw 3 ====
Team 6:30 pm

Sheet A	1	2	3	4	5	6	7	8	Final	Points
North America (McCormick)	0	0	1	1	0	0	1	0	3	0
World (Edin) 🔨	0	2	0	0	2	1	0	1	6	1

Sheet B	1	2	3	4	5	6	7	8	Final	Points
North America (Carey) 🔨	3	1	0	0	0	2	0	2	8	1
World (Fujisawa)	0	0	1	3	0	0	2	0	6	0

Sheet C	1	2	3	4	5	6	7	8	Final	Points
North America (Carruthers) 🔨	0	1	1	0	1	1	1	2	7	1
World (Stjerne)	1	0	0	2	0	0	0	0	3	0

=== Friday, January 13 ===
==== Draw 4 ====
Team 9:00 am

Sheet A	1	2	3	4	5	6	7	8	Final	Points
North America (Carey) 🔨	0	2	1	0	0	0	4	X	7	1
World (Feltscher)	1	0	0	2	0	0	0	X	3	0

Sheet B	1	2	3	4	5	6	7	8	Final	Points
North America (Carruthers) 🔨	0	3	0	2	0	2	0	X	7	1
World (Edin)	0	0	1	0	2	0	1	X	4	0

Sheet C	1	2	3	4	5	6	7	8	Final	Points
North America (Sinclair)	0	1	0	1	0	0	1	X	3	0
World (Fujisawa) 🔨	2	0	2	0	2	2	0	X	8	1

==== Draw 5 ====
Mixed doubles 1:30 pm

Sheet A	1	2	3	4	5	6	7	8	Final	Points
North America (Peterman/Plys)	1	0	3	0	2	0	0	1	7	1
World (Schori/Poulsen)	0	1	0	1	0	2	1	0	5	0

Sheet B	1	2	3	4	5	6	7	8	Final	Points
North America (Officer/Carruthers)	2	0	0	0	2	1	1	1	7	1
World (McManus/Sundgren)	0	2	1	1	0	0	0	0	4	0

Sheet C	1	2	3	4	5	6	7	8	Final	Points
North America (Jones/Laing)	0	3	0	1	0	0	1	0	5	0
World (Motohashi/Svae)	1	0	3	0	1	1	0	1	7	1

==== Draw 6 ====
Team 6:30 pm

Sheet A	1	2	3	4	5	6	7	8	Final	Points
North America (Koe)	0	2	1	0	2	1	0	X	6	1
World (Stjerne) 🔨	1	0	0	1	0	0	1	X	3	0

Sheet B	1	2	3	4	5	6	7	8	Final	Points
North America (Jones)	2	0	1	1	0	2	0	0	6	0.5
World (Hasselborg) 🔨	0	1	0	0	2	0	2	1	6	0.5

Sheet C	1	2	3	4	5	6	7	8	Final	Points
North America (McCormick) 🔨	2	0	0	0	0	1	0	X	3	0
World (Ulsrud)	0	1	1	0	3	0	2	X	7	1

=== Saturday, January 14 ===
==== Draw 7 ====
Mixed doubles 9:00 am

Sheet A	1	2	3	4	5	6	7	8	Final	Points
North America (Persinger/Koe)	4	0	5	0	4	0	1	X	14	2
World (Kaufmann/Frederiksen)	0	4	0	1	0	1	0	X	6	0

Sheet B	1	2	3	4	5	6	7	8	Final	Points
North America (Nixon/McCormick)	0	0	0	0	1	0	0	X	1	0
World (Knochenhauer/Wranå)	1	1	1	3	0	1	1	X	8	2

Sheet C	1	2	3	4	5	6	7	8	Final	Points
North America (Peters/Howell)	2	3	0	0	2	1	2	X	10	2
World (C. Yoshida/Vad Petersson)	0	0	1	1	0	0	0	X	2	0

==== Draw 8 ====
Team 1:30 pm

Sheet A B	1	2	3	4	5	6	7	8	Final	Points
North America (Jones) 🔨	1	2	0	2	0	2	1	X	8	1
World (Fujisawa)	0	0	1	0	1	0	0	X	2	0

Sheet B	1	2	3	4	5	6	7	8	Final	Points
North America (McCormick) 🔨	0	2	0	0	2	0	2	X	6	1
World (Stjerne)	0	0	2	0	0	2	0	X	4	0

Sheet C	1	2	3	4	5	6	7	8	Final	Points
North America (Carey)	0	0	2	0	2	0	2	0	6	1
World (Hasselborg) 🔨	0	2	0	1	0	1	0	1	5	0

==== Draw 9 ====
Team 6:30 pm

Sheet A	1	2	3	4	5	6	7	8	Final	Points
North America (Carruthers)	0	2	1	2	0	1	1	0	7	1
World (Ulsrud) 🔨	2	0	0	0	2	0	0	1	5	0

Sheet B	1	2	3	4	5	6	7	8	Final	Points
North America (Sinclair) 🔨	2	0	1	0	2	0	1	X	6	1
World (Feltscher)	0	0	0	1	0	1	0	X	2	0

Sheet C	1	2	3	4	5	6	7	8	Final	Points
North America (Koe)	0	0	1	1	0	0	0	0	2	0
World (Edin) 🔨	0	2	0	0	0	0	2	1	5	1

=== Sunday, January 15 ===
==== Draw 10 ====
Skins 1:30 pm

Values (points)	½	½	½	½	½	½	1	1	5
Sheet A	1	2	3	4	5	6	7	8	Total
North America (Walker/Hebert/Sinclair/Kennedy) 🔨			X		0	X	X		3
World (Urech/Vad Petersson/Schori/Nergård)	X	X		0				X	2

Values (points)	½	½	½	½	½	½	1	1	5
Sheet B	1	2	3	4	5	6	7	8	Total
North America (Carey) 🔨	X	X			X		0		1½
World (Fujisawa)			X	X		X		X	3½

Values (points)	½	½	½	½	½	½	1	1	5
Sheet C	1	2	3	4	5	6	7	8	Total
North America (McCormick)		0		X		X	X		3½
World (Stjerne) 🔨	X		0		0			X	1½

==== Draw 11 ====
Skins 6:30 pm

Values (points)	½	½	½	½	½	½	1	1	5
Sheet A	1	2	3	4	5	6	7	8	Total
North America (Jones) 🔨	X	X			0	X			2
World (Hasselborg)			0	X			X	X	3

Values (points)	½	½	½	½	½	½	1	1	5
Sheet B	1	2	3	4	5	6	7	8	Total
North America (Carruthers) 🔨		0		X			X	X	3½
World (Edin)	X		0		0	X			1½

Values (points)	½	½	½	½	½	½	1	1	5
Team	1	2	3	4	5	6	7	8	Total
North America (Persinger/Laing/Carlson/Koe)		X	X	X		0		X	4½
World (Kauffman/Svae/Feltscher/Ulsrud) 🔨	0				X		0		½
