= 2005 Canadian Olympic Curling Trials =

- Host city: Halifax, Nova Scotia
- Arena: Halifax Metro Centre
- Dates: December 3–11
- Attendance: 159,235
- Men's winner: (Newfoundland and Labrador) Brad Gushue
- Curling club: St. John's CC, St. John's
- Skip: Russ Howard
- Fourth: Brad Gushue
- Third: Mark Nichols
- Lead: Jamie Korab
- Alternate: Mike Adam
- Coach: Toby McDonald
- Finalist: (Manitoba) Jeff Stoughton
- Women's winner: (Alberta) Shannon Kleibrink
- Curling club: Calgary WC, Calgary
- Skip: Shannon Kleibrink
- Third: Amy Nixon
- Second: Glenys Bakker
- Lead: Christine Keshen
- Alternate: Sandra Jenkins
- Coach: Daryl Nixon
- Finalist: (British Columbia) Kelly Scott

The 2005 Canadian Olympic Curling Trials were held from December 3 to 11 at the Halifax Metro Centre in Halifax, Nova Scotia. The winning teams represented Canada at the 2006 Winter Olympics in Turin, Italy.

== Men ==
=== Teams ===
Skip	Third	Second	Lead	Alternate	Locale
Shawn Adams	Paul Flemming	Craig Burgess	Kelly Mittelstadt	Stuart MacLean	Mayflower CC, Halifax, Nova Scotia
Mark Dacey	Bruce Lohnes	Rob Harris	Andrew Gibson	Mathew Harris	Mayflower CC, Halifax, Nova Scotia
David Nedohin (fourth)	Randy Ferbey (skip)	Scott Pfeifer	Marcel Rocque	Dan Holowaychuk	Granite CC, Edmonton, Alberta
Brad Gushue (fourth)	Mark Nichols	Russ Howard (skip)	Jamie Korab	Mike Adam	St. John's CC, St. John's, Newfoundland and Labrador
Glenn Howard	Richard Hart	Brent Laing	Craig Savill	Wayne Middaugh	Coldwater & District CC, Coldwater, Ontario
Kevin Martin	Don Walchuk	Carter Rycroft	Don Bartlett	Scott Bailey	Saville SC, Edmonton, Alberta
John Morris	Kevin Koe	Marc Kennedy	Paul Moffatt	Ben Hebert	Calgary WC, Calgary, Alberta
Jay Peachey	Ron Leech	Kevin Recksiedler	Brad Fenton	Bryan Miki	Golden Ears WC, Maple Ridge, British Columbia
Jim Cotter (fourth)	Pat Ryan (skip)	Kevin MacKenzie	Rick Sawatsky	Bert Gretzinger	Kelowna CC, Kelowna, British Columbia
Jeff Stoughton	Jon Mead	Garry Van Den Berghe	Steve Gould	Don Harvey	Charleswood CC, Winnipeg, Manitoba

=== Round-robin standings ===
Final round-robin standings

Key
Teams to Playoffs

Skip	W	L
(Newfoundland and Labrador) Brad Gushue	8	1
(Manitoba) Jeff Stoughton	7	2
(Alberta) John Morris	6	3
(Ontario) Glenn Howard	5	4
(British Columbia) Pat Ryan	5	4
(Alberta) Kevin Martin	4	5
(Alberta) Randy Ferbey	4	5
(Nova Scotia) Shawn Adams	3	6
(Nova Scotia) Mark Dacey	3	6
(British Columbia) Jay Peachey	0	9

=== Round-robin results ===
==== Draw 2 ====
Sheet A	1	2	3	4	5	6	7	8	9	10	Final
(British Columbia) Jay Peachey 🔨	0	0	0	1	0	0	2	0	1	X	4
(British Columbia) Pat Ryan	0	1	2	0	2	1	0	1	0	X	7

Sheet B	1	2	3	4	5	6	7	8	9	10	Final
(Ontario) Glenn Howard 🔨	1	1	0	1	0	3	0	0	1	0	7
(Newfoundland and Labrador) Brad Gushue	0	0	3	0	1	0	2	2	0	1	9

Sheet C	1	2	3	4	5	6	7	8	9	10	Final
(Alberta) Randy Ferbey	0	0	1	2	0	1	0	1	0	X	5
(Alberta) Kevin Martin 🔨	1	1	0	0	1	0	4	0	1	X	8

Sheet D	1	2	3	4	5	6	7	8	9	10	Final
(Alberta) John Morris 🔨	0	2	2	0	2	0	1	0	1	X	8
(Manitoba) Jeff Stoughton	0	0	0	1	0	2	0	1	0	X	4

Sheet E	1	2	3	4	5	6	7	8	9	10	Final
(Nova Scotia) Mark Dacey	0	0	3	0	0	1	0	1	0	0	5
(Nova Scotia) Shawn Adams 🔨	2	1	0	0	2	0	1	0	1	1	8

==== Draw 4 ====
Sheet A	1	2	3	4	5	6	7	8	9	10	11	Final
(Ontario) Glenn Howard	1	0	1	0	2	0	1	0	0	1	0	6
(Nova Scotia) Mark Dacey 🔨	0	2	0	1	0	1	0	2	0	0	1	7

Sheet B	1	2	3	4	5	6	7	8	9	10	Final
(British Columbia) Pat Ryan 🔨	2	0	1	0	0	2	2	0	2	X	9
(Alberta) Kevin Martin	0	1	0	0	2	0	0	2	0	X	5

Sheet C	1	2	3	4	5	6	7	8	9	10	Final
(British Columbia) Jay Peachey 🔨	0	1	1	0	0	0	1	0	0	X	3
(Manitoba) Jeff Stoughton	1	0	0	1	1	1	0	2	2	X	8

Sheet D	1	2	3	4	5	6	7	8	9	10	Final
(Newfoundland and Labrador) Brad Gushue	0	1	0	2	0	2	0	3	0	2	10
(Nova Scotia) Shawn Adams 🔨	1	0	2	0	1	0	2	0	1	0	7

Sheet E	1	2	3	4	5	6	7	8	9	10	Final
(Alberta) Randy Ferbey 🔨	1	0	2	0	1	0	1	2	0	1	8
(Alberta) John Morris	0	1	0	2	0	3	0	0	1	0	7

==== Draw 6 ====
Sheet A	1	2	3	4	5	6	7	8	9	10	Final
(Alberta) Randy Ferbey	0	2	1	0	1	0	2	0	0	0	6
(Newfoundland and Labrador) Brad Gushue 🔨	2	0	0	1	0	2	0	2	0	2	9

Sheet B	1	2	3	4	5	6	7	8	9	10	11	Final
(Manitoba) Jeff Stoughton 🔨	1	0	1	0	0	1	0	0	1	0	1	5
(Nova Scotia) Shawn Adams	0	1	0	0	1	0	0	1	0	1	0	4

Sheet C	1	2	3	4	5	6	7	8	9	10	Final
(Alberta) John Morris 🔨	0	2	0	1	0	2	0	0	2	X	7
(British Columbia) Pat Ryan	0	0	1	0	1	0	0	1	0	X	3

Sheet D	1	2	3	4	5	6	7	8	9	10	Final
(Nova Scotia) Mark Dacey	0	1	0	2	0	1	0	X	X	X	4
(Alberta) Kevin Martin 🔨	3	0	2	0	2	0	3	X	X	X	10

Sheet E	1	2	3	4	5	6	7	8	9	10	Final
(Ontario) Glenn Howard 🔨	1	0	2	0	2	1	0	1	0	X	7
(British Columbia) Jay Peachey	0	1	0	1	0	0	0	0	1	X	3

==== Draw 8 ====
Sheet A	1	2	3	4	5	6	7	8	9	10	11	Final
(British Columbia) Pat Ryan 🔨	1	1	0	1	0	0	0	1	0	2	0	6
(Manitoba) Jeff Stoughton	0	0	1	0	1	1	1	0	2	0	1	7

Sheet B	1	2	3	4	5	6	7	8	9	10	Final
(Alberta) Randy Ferbey 🔨	1	1	0	1	0	0	0	1	0	X	4
(Ontario) Glenn Howard	0	0	2	0	0	1	2	0	2	X	7

Sheet C	1	2	3	4	5	6	7	8	9	10	Final
(Newfoundland and Labrador) Brad Gushue	3	0	2	3	0	0	2	X	X	X	10
(Nova Scotia) Mark Dacey 🔨	0	1	0	0	2	1	0	X	X	X	4

Sheet D	1	2	3	4	5	6	7	8	9	10	Final
(British Columbia) Jay Peachey 🔨	0	2	0	0	3	0	0	1	0	X	6
(Alberta) John Morris	2	0	0	2	0	2	1	0	2	X	9

Sheet E	1	2	3	4	5	6	7	8	9	10	Final
(Nova Scotia) Shawn Adams 🔨	1	0	2	0	1	0	1	0	0	X	5
(Alberta) Kevin Martin	0	1	0	1	0	2	0	2	1	X	7

==== Draw 10 ====
Sheet A	1	2	3	4	5	6	7	8	9	10	Final
(Alberta) Kevin Martin 🔨	0	1	0	0	2	0	0	2	0	2	7
(British Columbia) Jay Peachey	2	0	1	0	0	0	1	0	2	0	6

Sheet B	1	2	3	4	5	6	7	8	9	10	Final
(Alberta) John Morris 🔨	0	2	0	1	0	2	1	0	1	X	7
(Nova Scotia) Mark Dacey	0	0	2	0	1	0	0	1	0	X	4

Sheet C	1	2	3	4	5	6	7	8	9	10	11	Final
(Ontario) Glenn Howard 🔨	1	0	0	3	0	1	4	0	1	0	0	10
(Nova Scotia) Shawn Adams	0	2	0	0	4	0	0	2	0	2	1	11

Sheet D	1	2	3	4	5	6	7	8	9	10	Final
(British Columbia) Pat Ryan	0	2	0	2	1	0	0	2	2	X	9
(Newfoundland and Labrador) Brad Gushue 🔨	2	0	0	0	0	1	2	0	0	X	5

Sheet E	1	2	3	4	5	6	7	8	9	10	Final
(Manitoba) Jeff Stoughton 🔨	2	3	0	3	0	3	X	X	X	X	11
(Alberta) Randy Ferbey	0	0	1	0	1	0	X	X	X	X	2

==== Draw 12 ====
Sheet A	1	2	3	4	5	6	7	8	9	10	Final
(Alberta) John Morris	0	3	0	2	0	2	0	2	0	1	10
(Nova Scotia) Shawn Adams 🔨	1	0	2	0	2	0	1	0	1	0	7

Sheet B	1	2	3	4	5	6	7	8	9	10	Final
(British Columbia) Jay Peachey	0	1	0	1	0	0	2	0	X	X	4
(Alberta) Randy Ferbey 🔨	2	0	2	0	0	3	0	3	X	X	10

Sheet C	1	2	3	4	5	6	7	8	9	10	Final
(Manitoba) Jeff Stoughton 🔨	0	0	1	0	1	0	1	1	0	X	4
(Newfoundland and Labrador) Brad Gushue	0	0	0	2	0	1	0	0	4	X	7

Sheet D	1	2	3	4	5	6	7	8	9	10	Final
(Alberta) Kevin Martin 🔨	1	1	0	1	0	1	0	2	0	0	6
(Ontario) Glenn Howard	0	0	2	0	2	0	1	0	2	1	8

Sheet E	1	2	3	4	5	6	7	8	9	10	11	Final
(British Columbia) Pat Ryan 🔨	0	0	2	0	1	0	0	2	0	0	2	7
(Nova Scotia) Mark Dacey	0	0	0	0	0	2	1	0	0	2	0	6

==== Draw 14 ====
Sheet A	1	2	3	4	5	6	7	8	9	10	Final
(Manitoba) Jeff Stoughton	0	3	0	0	3	0	1	0	2	X	9
(Ontario) Glenn Howard 🔨	2	0	1	1	0	1	0	1	0	X	6

Sheet B	1	2	3	4	5	6	7	8	9	10	Final
(Nova Scotia) Shawn Adams	0	0	0	1	0	0	0	X	X	X	1
(British Columbia) Pat Ryan 🔨	2	1	1	0	1	2	1	X	X	X	8

Sheet C	1	2	3	4	5	6	7	8	9	10	Final
(Alberta) Kevin Martin	0	0	0	1	0	1	0	0	1	X	3
(Alberta) John Morris 🔨	0	0	1	0	2	0	2	1	0	X	6

Sheet D	1	2	3	4	5	6	7	8	9	10	Final
(Alberta) Randy Ferbey	1	0	0	0	2	0	1	0	X	X	4
(Nova Scotia) Mark Dacey 🔨	0	2	0	4	0	2	0	1	X	X	9

Sheet E	1	2	3	4	5	6	7	8	9	10	Final
(British Columbia) Jay Peachey 🔨	2	0	1	0	0	0	1	0	2	0	6
(Newfoundland and Labrador) Brad Gushue	0	2	0	2	1	0	0	1	0	1	7

==== Draw 16 ====
Sheet A	1	2	3	4	5	6	7	8	9	10	Final
(Newfoundland and Labrador) Brad Gushue 🔨	2	1	0	1	1	2	0	1	0	0	8
(Alberta) Kevin Martin	0	0	2	0	0	0	2	0	3	0	7

Sheet B	1	2	3	4	5	6	7	8	9	10	Final
(Nova Scotia) Mark Dacey	0	2	0	1	0	1	0	0	1	X	5
(Manitoba) Jeff Stoughton 🔨	2	0	2	0	2	0	2	0	0	X	8

Sheet C	1	2	3	4	5	6	7	8	9	10	Final
(British Columbia) Pat Ryan	2	0	1	0	0	0	2	0	0	0	5
(Alberta) Randy Ferbey 🔨	0	1	0	0	2	0	0	2	1	2	8

Sheet D	1	2	3	4	5	6	7	8	9	10	Final
(Nova Scotia) Shawn Adams	0	0	2	0	0	2	3	0	1	X	8
(British Columbia) Jay Peachey 🔨	0	1	0	0	1	0	0	1	0	X	3

Sheet E	1	2	3	4	5	6	7	8	9	10	11	Final
(Alberta) John Morris 🔨	0	2	1	0	2	0	0	1	0	0	0	6
(Ontario) Glenn Howard	1	0	0	1	0	2	0	0	1	1	2	8

==== Draw 18 ====
Sheet A	1	2	3	4	5	6	7	8	9	10	11	Final
(Nova Scotia) Shawn Adams 🔨	3	2	0	1	0	1	0	0	0	0	0	7
(Alberta) Randy Ferbey	0	0	1	0	3	0	0	0	2	1	1	8

Sheet B	1	2	3	4	5	6	7	8	9	10	Final
(Newfoundland and Labrador) Brad Gushue 🔨	2	0	1	1	1	0	2	0	0	X	7
(Alberta) John Morris	0	1	0	0	0	1	0	1	1	X	4

Sheet C	1	2	3	4	5	6	7	8	9	10	Final
(Nova Scotia) Mark Dacey 🔨	1	2	0	0	3	2	0	0	1	2	11
(British Columbia) Jay Peachey	0	0	2	0	0	0	2	2	0	0	6

Sheet D	1	2	3	4	5	6	7	8	9	10	Final
(Ontario) Glenn Howard 🔨	1	0	2	0	2	0	2	0	0	1	8
(British Columbia) Pat Ryan	0	2	0	1	0	2	0	2	0	0	7

Sheet E	1	2	3	4	5	6	7	8	9	10	Final
(Alberta) Kevin Martin 🔨	1	0	0	0	1	0	0	X	X	X	2
(Manitoba) Jeff Stoughton	0	0	5	0	0	2	1	X	X	X	8

=== Playoffs ===
Semifinal			Final
			1	(Newfoundland and Labrador) Brad Gushue	8
2	(Manitoba) Jeff Stoughton	8	2	(Manitoba) Jeff Stoughton	7
3	(Alberta) John Morris	6

==== Semifinal ====
Sheet C	1	2	3	4	5	6	7	8	9	10	Final
(Manitoba) Jeff Stoughton 🔨	0	0	2	3	1	0	1	0	0	1	8
(Alberta) John Morris	0	1	0	0	0	2	0	2	1	0	6

==== Final ====
Sheet C	1	2	3	4	5	6	7	8	9	10	Final
(Manitoba) Jeff Stoughton	0	2	0	0	2	0	0	2	0	1	7
(Newfoundland and Labrador) Brad Gushue 🔨	2	0	2	2	0	1	0	0	1	0	8

== Women ==
=== Teams ===
Skip	Third	Second	Lead	Alternate	Locale
Sherry Anderson	Kim Hodson	Heather Walsh	Donna Gignac	Amber Holland	Delisle CC, Delisle, Saskatchewan
Jan Betker	Sherry Linton	Joan McCusker	Marcia Gudereit	Nancy Inglis	Caledonian CC, Regina, Saskatchewan
Colleen Jones	Kim Kelly	Mary-Anne Arsenault	Nancy Delahunt	Mary Sue Radford	Mayflower CC, Halifax, Nova Scotia
Jennifer Jones	Cathy Overton-Clapham	Jill Officer	Georgina Wheatcroft	Janet Arnott	St. Vital CC, Winnipeg, Manitoba
Shannon Kleibrink	Amy Nixon	Glenys Bakker	Christine Keshen	Sandra Jenkins	Calgary WC, Calgary, Alberta
Marie-France Larouche	Karo Gagnon	Annie Lemay	Véronique Grégoire	Nancy Bélanger	(Quebec) CC Victoria, Sainte-Foy (Quebec) CC Etchemin, Saint-Romuald
Stefanie Lawton	Marliese Kasner	Sherri Singler	Chelsey Bell	Beth Iskiw	(Saskatchewan) CN CC, Saskatoon
Sherry Middaugh	Kirsten Wall	Andrea Lawes	Sheri Greenman	Cathy King	Coldwater & District CC, Coldwater, Ontario
Jo-Ann Rizzo	Cheryl McPherson	Kimberly Tuck	Sara Gatchell	Jayne Flinn-Burton	Brant CC, Brantford, Ontario
Kelly Scott	Jeanna Schraeder	Sasha Carter	Renee Simons	Michelle Allen	Kelowna CC, Kelowna, British Columbia

=== Round-robin standings ===
Final round-robin standings

Key
Teams to Playoffs

Skip	W	L
(British Columbia) Kelly Scott	7	2
(Alberta) Shannon Kleibrink (Note: Kleibrink claimed the second seed based on round-robin wins over Lawton and Middaugh.)	6	3
(Saskatchewan) Stefanie Lawton	6	3
(Ontario) Sherry Middaugh	6	3
(Saskatchewan) Sherry Anderson	5	4
(Manitoba) Jennifer Jones	5	4
(Saskatchewan) Jan Betker	4	5
(Nova Scotia) Colleen Jones	3	6
(Ontario) Jo-Ann Rizzo	2	7
(Quebec) Marie-France Larouche	1	8

=== Round-robin results ===
==== Draw 1 ====
Sheet A	1	2	3	4	5	6	7	8	9	10	Final
(Ontario) Jo-Ann Rizzo	0	2	0	0	1	0	0	2	0	0	5
(Ontario) Sherry Middaugh 🔨	2	0	0	1	0	0	2	0	2	2	9

Sheet B	1	2	3	4	5	6	7	8	9	10	Final
(Nova Scotia) Colleen Jones 🔨	0	2	0	1	2	0	1	0	0	0	6
(British Columbia) Kelly Scott	0	0	3	0	0	1	0	0	2	1	7

Sheet C	1	2	3	4	5	6	7	8	9	10	Final
(Saskatchewan) Stefanie Lawton 🔨	0	3	0	2	3	1	0	X	X	X	9
(Saskatchewan) Jan Betker	0	0	1	0	0	0	1	X	X	X	2

Sheet D	1	2	3	4	5	6	7	8	9	10	Final
(Saskatchewan) Sherry Anderson 🔨	1	0	2	0	0	2	0	3	0	X	8
(Manitoba) Jennifer Jones	0	1	0	1	0	0	2	0	1	X	5

Sheet E	1	2	3	4	5	6	7	8	9	10	Final
(Quebec) Marie-France Larouche	0	0	0	0	1	0	0	0	X	X	1
(Alberta) Shannon Kleibrink 🔨	0	0	3	3	0	1	1	1	X	X	9

==== Draw 3 ====
Sheet A	1	2	3	4	5	6	7	8	9	10	Final
(Nova Scotia) Colleen Jones	0	1	3	0	4	0	1	0	2	X	11
(Quebec) Marie-France Larouche 🔨	1	0	0	1	0	3	0	2	0	X	7

Sheet B	1	2	3	4	5	6	7	8	9	10	Final
(Ontario) Sherry Middaugh 🔨	3	0	3	1	0	0	4	X	X	X	11
(Saskatchewan) Jan Betker	0	1	0	0	2	1	0	X	X	X	4

Sheet C	1	2	3	4	5	6	7	8	9	10	Final
(Ontario) Jo-Ann Rizzo 🔨	0	1	0	0	1	0	2	0	0	X	4
(Manitoba) Jennifer Jones	1	0	1	1	0	1	0	1	1	X	6

Sheet D	1	2	3	4	5	6	7	8	9	10	11	Final
(British Columbia) Kelly Scott	0	1	1	0	1	0	0	2	0	3	1	9
(Alberta) Shannon Kleibrink 🔨	3	0	0	2	0	1	1	0	1	0	0	8

Sheet E	1	2	3	4	5	6	7	8	9	10	11	Final
(Saskatchewan) Stefanie Lawton 🔨	1	0	0	0	2	0	0	1	0	2	0	6
(Saskatchewan) Sherry Anderson	0	0	1	1	0	0	1	0	3	0	1	7

==== Draw 5 ====
Sheet A	1	2	3	4	5	6	7	8	9	10	11	Final
(Saskatchewan) Stefanie Lawton	0	0	1	1	0	1	2	0	2	0	1	8
(British Columbia) Kelly Scott 🔨	0	2	0	0	1	0	0	2	0	2	0	7

Sheet B	1	2	3	4	5	6	7	8	9	10	11	Final
(Manitoba) Jennifer Jones 🔨	1	0	2	0	1	0	2	0	1	0	1	8
(Alberta) Shannon Kleibrink	0	3	0	1	0	2	0	0	0	1	0	7

Sheet C	1	2	3	4	5	6	7	8	9	10	Final
(Saskatchewan) Sherry Anderson 🔨	0	0	0	0	0	1	0	4	0	X	5
(Ontario) Sherry Middaugh	1	1	0	1	3	0	1	0	1	X	8

Sheet D	1	2	3	4	5	6	7	8	9	10	Final
(Quebec) Marie-France Larouche	0	0	1	0	1	0	X	X	X	X	2
(Saskatchewan) Jan Betker 🔨	1	3	0	4	0	1	X	X	X	X	9

Sheet E	1	2	3	4	5	6	7	8	9	10	Final
(Nova Scotia) Colleen Jones 🔨	0	2	0	0	1	0	1	0	0	3	7
(Ontario) Jo-Ann Rizzo	0	0	0	1	0	1	0	1	1	0	4

==== Draw 7 ====
Sheet A	1	2	3	4	5	6	7	8	9	10	Final
(Ontario) Sherry Middaugh 🔨	2	0	1	0	1	0	2	0	2	X	8
(Manitoba) Jennifer Jones	0	2	0	2	0	2	0	5	0	X	11

Sheet B	1	2	3	4	5	6	7	8	9	10	Final
(Saskatchewan) Stefanie Lawton 🔨	1	0	2	1	0	3	0	3	X	X	10
(Nova Scotia) Colleen Jones	0	1	0	0	1	0	1	0	X	X	3

Sheet C	1	2	3	4	5	6	7	8	9	10	Final
(British Columbia) Kelly Scott	0	0	0	2	0	1	0	0	2	1	6
(Quebec) Marie-France Larouche 🔨	1	0	0	0	2	0	1	1	0	0	5

Sheet D	1	2	3	4	5	6	7	8	9	10	Final
(Ontario) Jo-Ann Rizzo 🔨	2	0	0	0	1	0	2	0	1	2	8
(Saskatchewan) Sherry Anderson	0	1	1	1	0	1	0	1	0	0	5

Sheet E	1	2	3	4	5	6	7	8	9	10	Final
(Alberta) Shannon Kleibrink 🔨	2	0	1	0	1	0	0	0	1	X	5
(Saskatchewan) Jan Betker	0	2	0	3	0	1	1	1	1	X	8

==== Draw 9 ====
Sheet A	1	2	3	4	5	6	7	8	9	10	Final
(Saskatchewan) Jan Betker 🔨	2	0	0	2	0	1	0	0	1	0	6
(Ontario) Jo-Ann Rizzo	0	1	1	0	2	0	0	1	0	2	7

Sheet B	1	2	3	4	5	6	7	8	9	10	Final
(Saskatchewan) Sherry Anderson 🔨	0	0	0	1	1	1	0	0	0	3	6
(Quebec) Marie-France Larouche	0	0	1	0	0	0	1	1	1	0	4

Sheet C	1	2	3	4	5	6	7	8	9	10	Final
(Nova Scotia) Colleen Jones 🔨	1	0	0	0	0	0	2	0	0	X	3
(Alberta) Shannon Kleibrink	0	0	0	2	0	1	0	3	1	X	7

Sheet D	1	2	3	4	5	6	7	8	9	10	Final
(Ontario) Sherry Middaugh	0	0	0	0	1	0	2	0	0	X	3
(British Columbia) Kelly Scott 🔨	1	0	0	1	0	1	0	4	1	X	8

Sheet E	1	2	3	4	5	6	7	8	9	10	Final
(Manitoba) Jennifer Jones	0	1	0	0	0	0	2	0	2	X	5
(Saskatchewan) Stefanie Lawton	2	0	0	1	1	1	0	3	0	X	8

==== Draw 11 ====
Sheet A	1	2	3	4	5	6	7	8	9	10	11	Final
(Saskatchewan) Sherry Anderson	0	0	1	0	0	2	0	1	0	2	0	6
(Alberta) Shannon Kleibrink 🔨	0	1	0	2	1	0	1	0	1	0	1	7

Sheet B	1	2	3	4	5	6	7	8	9	10	Final
(Ontario) Jo-Ann Rizzo	0	2	0	0	2	0	1	0	1	0	6
(Saskatchewan) Stefanie Lawton 🔨	2	0	1	1	0	1	0	2	0	1	8

Sheet C	1	2	3	4	5	6	7	8	9	10	Final
(Manitoba) Jennifer Jones 🔨	2	0	0	1	0	1	0	0	X	X	4
(British Columbia) Kelly Scott	0	2	1	0	3	0	1	2	X	X	9

Sheet D	1	2	3	4	5	6	7	8	9	10	Final
(Saskatchewan) Jan Betker 🔨	0	2	0	1	1	2	0	1	0	1	8
(Nova Scotia) Colleen Jones	0	0	3	0	0	0	2	0	2	0	7

Sheet E	1	2	3	4	5	6	7	8	9	10	Final
(Ontario) Sherry Middaugh 🔨	1	0	0	1	0	3	0	2	3	X	10
(Quebec) Marie-France Larouche	0	0	1	0	2	0	1	0	0	X	4

==== Draw 13 ====
Sheet A	1	2	3	4	5	6	7	8	9	10	Final
(Manitoba) Jennifer Jones	0	0	0	0	0	1	0	0	0	X	1
(Nova Scotia) Colleen Jones 🔨	1	0	0	1	1	0	1	1	2	X	7

Sheet B	1	2	3	4	5	6	7	8	9	10	11	Final
(Alberta) Shannon Kleibrink	1	0	0	1	0	1	0	2	1	0	1	7
(Ontario) Sherry Middaugh 🔨	0	1	0	0	2	0	2	0	0	1	0	6

Sheet C	1	2	3	4	5	6	7	8	9	10	Final
(Saskatchewan) Jan Betker	0	0	2	1	0	1	0	2	0	1	7
(Saskatchewan) Sherry Anderson 🔨	0	1	0	0	1	0	1	0	2	0	5

Sheet D	1	2	3	4	5	6	7	8	9	10	Final
(Saskatchewan) Stefanie Lawton	0	0	0	2	0	1	0	5	0	2	10
(Quebec) Marie-France Larouche 🔨	0	1	2	0	1	0	3	0	1	0	8

Sheet E	1	2	3	4	5	6	7	8	9	10	Final
(Ontario) Jo-Ann Rizzo	0	2	0	0	2	0	1	0	2	0	7
(British Columbia) Kelly Scott	1	0	1	0	0	3	0	1	0	2	8

==== Draw 15 ====
Sheet A	1	2	3	4	5	6	7	8	9	10	Final
(British Columbia) Kelly Scott 🔨	0	0	1	0	3	0	2	0	2	X	8
(Saskatchewan) Jan Betker	1	0	0	1	0	1	0	1	0	X	4

Sheet B	1	2	3	4	5	6	7	8	9	10	Final
(Quebec) Marie-France Larouche	1	0	1	1	0	0	1	0	1	0	5
(Manitoba) Jennifer Jones 🔨	0	1	0	0	2	1	0	2	0	1	7

Sheet C	1	2	3	4	5	6	7	8	9	10	Final
(Ontario) Sherry Middaugh	0	0	0	1	0	1	1	0	2	1	6
(Saskatchewan) Stefanie Lawton 🔨	0	2	0	0	1	0	0	2	0	0	5

Sheet D	1	2	3	4	5	6	7	8	9	10	Final
(Alberta) Shannon Kleibrink	0	0	2	0	2	0	0	1	1	1	7
(Ontario) Jo-Ann Rizzo 🔨	1	0	0	1	0	1	1	0	0	0	4

Sheet E	1	2	3	4	5	6	7	8	9	10	Final
(Saskatchewan) Sherry Anderson 🔨	0	2	0	1	1	0	0	3	0	0	7
(Nova Scotia) Colleen Jones	1	0	1	0	0	1	0	0	2	1	6

==== Draw 17 ====
Sheet A	1	2	3	4	5	6	7	8	9	10	Final
(Alberta) Shannon Kleibrink 🔨	0	0	3	0	0	0	3	0	1	X	7
(Saskatchewan) Stefanie Lawton	0	0	0	0	1	1	0	1	0	X	3

Sheet B	1	2	3	4	5	6	7	8	9	10	Final
(British Columbia) Kelly Scott 🔨	0	1	0	0	1	0	1	0	2	0	5
(Saskatchewan) Sherry Anderson	2	0	0	2	0	1	0	1	0	2	8

Sheet C	1	2	3	4	5	6	7	8	9	10	Final
(Quebec) Marie-France Larouche 🔨	2	0	1	0	0	1	1	1	0	1	7
(Ontario) Jo-Ann Rizzo	0	1	0	3	1	0	0	0	1	0	6

Sheet D	1	2	3	4	5	6	7	8	9	10	Final
(Nova Scotia) Colleen Jones 🔨	3	0	0	1	0	0	2	0	2	0	8
(Ontario) Sherry Middaugh	0	3	1	0	2	1	0	1	0	1	9

Sheet E	1	2	3	4	5	6	7	8	9	10	Final
(Saskatchewan) Jan Betker 🔨	0	0	2	0	2	0	2	0	1	X	7
(Manitoba) Jennifer Jones	0	3	0	1	0	3	0	1	0	X	8

=== Tiebreaker ===
Sheet B	1	2	3	4	5	6	7	8	9	10	Final
(Saskatchewan) Stefanie Lawton	0	1	0	2	0	2	0	4	X	X	9
(Ontario) Sherry Middaugh 🔨	1	0	1	0	1	0	1	0	X	X	4

=== Playoffs ===
Semifinal			Final
			1	(British Columbia) Kelly Scott	7
2	(Alberta) Shannon Kleibrink	5	2	(Alberta) Shannon Kleibrink	8
3	(Saskatchewan) Stefanie Lawton	4

==== Semifinal ====
Sheet C	1	2	3	4	5	6	7	8	9	10	Final
(Saskatchewan) Stefanie Lawton	0	0	1	0	1	0	1	0	1	0	4
(Alberta) Shannon Kleibrink 🔨	1	0	0	1	0	1	0	1	0	1	5

==== Final ====
Sheet C	1	2	3	4	5	6	7	8	9	10	Final
(British Columbia) Kelly Scott 🔨	1	0	1	0	1	0	2	1	1	0	7
(Alberta) Shannon Kleibrink	0	1	0	2	0	2	0	0	0	3	8
