= 2004 BDO Curling Classic =

Grand Slam of Curling event

- Host city: Hamilton, Ontario
- Arena: Glendale Golf & Country Club
- Dates: November 4–7, 2004
- Winner: (Alberta) Team Martin
- Skip: Kevin Martin
- Third: Don Walchuk
- Second: Carter Rycroft
- Lead: Don Bartlett
- Finalist: (Manitoba) Jeff Stoughton

2004 BDO Curling Classic was held November 4–7, 2004 at the Glendale Golf & Country Club in Hamilton, Ontario. The total purse of the event was $100,000. It was the first of four (men's) Grand Slam events of the 2004-05 curling season, and it is considered to be that season's version of The National event.

Edmonton's Kevin Martin rink overcame a 5–0 deficit to defeat Winnipeg's Jeff Stoughton team in the final, 10–9. Team Martin picked up $30,000 for the win.

Sportsnet covered the semifinal and final on television.

== Teams ==
The teams were as follows:

Skip	Third	Second	Lead	Locale
Chad Allen	Chad Simpson	Jay Allen	Lyndon Blaney	Brantford, Ontario
Dave Boehmer	Pat Spring	Richard Daneault	Don Harvey	Petersfield, Manitoba
Todd Brandwood	Scott Banner	Bill Buchanan	Brad Hiscock	Hamilton, Ontario
Tom Brewster	Graeme Connal	Ron Brewster	Colin Campbell	Glasgow, Scotland
Kerry Burtnyk	Ken Tresoor	Rob Fowler	Keith Fenton	Winnipeg, Manitoba
Peter Corner	Craig Kochan	Ian Robertson	Ken McDermot	Thornhill, Ontario
Mark Dacey	Bruce Lohnes	Rob Harris	Andrew Gibson	Halifax, Nova Scotia
Glen Despins	Rod Montgomery	Phillip Germain	Dwayne Mihalicz	Regina, Saskatchewan
Pat Duggan	Matt Weatherbie	Matthew Bulman	Jamie Wenske	Toronto, Ontario
David Nedohin	Randy Ferbey (skip)	Scott Pfeifer	Marcel Rocque	Edmonton, Alberta
Rick Folk	Kevin Folk	Jeff Richard	Gerry Richard	Kelowna, British Columbia
Chris Fulton	Jeff Henderson	Craig Cordiner	Nicolas Aubin	Ottawa, Ontario
Brad Gushue	Mark Nichols	Keith Ryan	Jamie Korab	St. John's, Newfoundland and Labrador
Mike Harris	John Base	Phil Loevenmark	Trevor Wall	Oakville, Ontario
Cory Heggestad	Mark Barran	?	Bob Drumond	Barrie, Ontario
Guy Hemmings	Martin Ferland	François Gagné	Dale Ness	Saint-Aimé, Quebec
Glenn Howard	Richard Hart	Brent Laing	Craig Savill	Coldwater, Ontario
Russ Howard	James Grattan	Grant Odishaw	Marc LeCocq	Moncton, New Brunswick
Al Hutchinson	Daryl Shane	Bruce Cox	Peter Irwin	Owen Sound, Ontario
Kevin Martin	Don Walchuk	Carter Rycroft	Don Bartlett	Edmonton, Alberta
Heath McCormick	Peter Steski	Jeff Steski	Shaun Harris	Oil City, Ontario
Wayne Middaugh	Graeme McCarrel	Joe Frans	Scott Bailey	Midland, Ontario
Garth Mitchell	Bill Mackay	Derek Dix	Jeff Corey	Oakville, Ontario
John Morris	Kevin Koe	Marc Kennedy	Paul Moffatt	Calgary, Alberta
Brent Palmer	Rob Nixon	Scott Simpson	Rob Gregg	Burlington, Ontario
Vic Peters	Mark Lukowich	Chris Neufeld	Denni Neufeld	Winnipeg, Manitoba
Nick Rizzo	John Epping	Scott Foster	Rob Brockbank	Brantford, Ontario
Andreas Schwaller	Christof Schwaller	Markus Eggler	Andreas Östreich	Basel, Switzerland
David Serwatuk	Doug Garritsen	Steve Goodger	Rob Watts	Hamilton, Ontario
Jeff Stoughton	Jon Mead	Garry Vandenberghe	Steve Gould	Winnipeg, Manitoba
Tim Morrison	Wayne Tuck Jr. (skip)	Jason Boyce	Jason Curtis	Brantford, Ontario
Ed Werenich	Neil Harrison	Ryan Werenich	Lino Di Iorio	Holland Landing, Ontario

== Draw ==
The event was a triple knock out.

== Playoffs ==
The playoff scores were as follows:

Quarter-Finals
(Alberta) Martin	7
(Manitoba) Boehmer	3
(New Brunswick) R. Howard	8
(Manitoba) Burtnyk	5
(Manitoba) Stoughton	8
(Scotland) Brewster	1
(Ontario) G. Howard	10
(Alberta) Morris	2

Semi-Finals
(Alberta) Martin	5
(New Brunswick) R. Howard	3
(Manitoba) Stoughton	8
(Ontario) G. Howard	5

Final
(Alberta) Martin	10
(Manitoba) Stoughton	9

=== Final ===
Team	1	2	3	4	5	6	7	8	9	10	Final
(Alberta) Kevin Martin	0	1	0	3	0	3	1	0	1	1	10
(Manitoba) Jeff Stoughton 🔨	5	0	1	0	1	0	0	2	0	0	9
