= 2003 Masters of Curling (December) =

Grand Slam of Curling event

2003 M&M Meat Shops Masters of Curling
- Host city: Sudbury, Ontario
- Arena: Garson Arena
- Dates: December 11 – 14
- Winner: (Ontario) Wayne Middaugh
- Curling club: St. George's G&CC, Etobicoke, Toronto
- Skip: Wayne Middaugh
- Third: Graeme McCarrel
- Second: Joe Frans
- Lead: Scott Bailey
- Finalist: (Manitoba) Jeff Stoughton

The 2003 M&M Meat Shops Masters of Curling was held from December 11 to 14, 2003 at the Garson Arena in Sudbury, Ontario. The event was one of the four men's Grand Slams of the 2003–04 curling season.

The total purse for the event was $100,000, with $30,000 going to the winning team. The format was a triple knockout. The semifinals and finals were aired on Sportsnet.

The event was the first Slam to feature the World champion Randy Ferbey rink, who had been banned from competition by the World Curling Players Association for refusing to boycott playing in the Brier due to a dispute between the Players Association and the Canadian Curling Association. There was much excitement for the potential of a match between Ferbey and their cross-town rivals, Team Kevin Martin who were on opposite sides of the dispute, meaning the two teams had not played since the final of the 2001 Alberta men's championship. The two teams did end up playing off in a C qualifying match, with Martin easily winning 7–1.

The final featured Wayne Middaugh of Ontario defeating Team Jeff Stoughton 5–2. Middaugh's rink won the $30,000 top prize, while Stoughton took home $18,000. There was also a third place match, which saw Team Martin defeat Nova Scotia's Mark Dacey 9–7. Team Martin earned $14,000 for third place, while Dacey won $10,000.

== Teams ==
The teams were as follows:

Skip	Third	Second	Lead	Locale	WCPA ranking
Kerry Burtnyk	Ken Tresoor	Rob Fowler	Keith Fenton	Winnipeg, Manitoba	8th
Mark Dacey	Bruce Lohnes	Rob Harris	Andrew Gibson	Halifax, Nova Scotia	24th
Glen Despins	Rod Montgomery	Phillip Germain	Dwayne Mihalicz	Regina, Saskatchewan	6th
Pete Fenson	Eric Fenson	Shawn Rojeski	John Shuster	(United States) Bemidji, Minnesota	NR
David Nedohin	Randy Ferbey (skip)	Scott Pfeifer	Jeff Erickson (Note: Erickson spared for regular lead Marcel Rocque, who could not take time off work)	Edmonton, Alberta	4th
Guy Hemmings	Martin Ferland	Pierre Charette	Dale Ness	Saint-Aimé, Quebec	15th
Andy Kapp	Uli Kapp	Oliver Axnick	Holger Höhne	Füssen, Germany	NR
Blake MacDonald	Jamie King (skip)	Aaron Skillen	Ryan Keane	Edmonton, Alberta	13th
Kevin Martin	Don Walchuk	Carter Rycroft	Don Bartlett	Edmonton, Alberta	1st
Greg McAulay	Brent Pierce	Dean Koyanagi	Ross Graham	Richmond, British Columbia	19th
Wayne Middaugh	Graeme McCarrel	Joe Frans	Scott Bailey	Midland, Ontario	2nd
John Morris	Kevin Koe	Marc Kennedy	Paul Moffatt	Calgary, Alberta	9th
Kevin Park	Shane Park	Scott Park	Kerry Park	Edmonton, Alberta	14th
Vic Peters	Ryan Fry	Chris Neufeld	Denni Neufeld	Winnipeg, Manitoba	10th
Keith Ryan	Mike Ryan	Mike Adam	Dennis Langdon	Labrador City, Newfoundland and Labrador	NR
Jeff Stoughton	Jon Mead	Garry Vandenberghe	Steve Gould	Winnipeg, Manitoba	3rd

== Playoffs ==
The playoff scores were as follows:

Quarterfinals
(Alberta) Kevin Martin	8
(Alberta) John Morris	7
(Ontario) Wayne Middaugh	8
(Alberta) Kevin Park	3
(Nova Scotia) Mark Dacey	7
(Manitoba) Kerry Burtnyk	6
(Manitoba) Jeff Stoughton	8
(Quebec) Guy Hemmings	6

Semifinals
(Alberta) Kevin Martin	6
(Ontario) Wayne Middaugh	9
(Nova Scotia) Mark Dacey	4
(Manitoba) Jeff Stoughton	6

Finals
(Ontario) Wayne Middaugh	5
(Manitoba) Jeff Stoughton	2
Third place
(Alberta) Kevin Martin	9
(Nova Scotia) Mark Dacey	7
