= 2004 Masters of Curling =

Grand Slam of Curling event

2004 M&M Meat Shops Masters of Curling
- Host city: Humboldt, Saskatchewan
- Arena: Elgar Petersen Arena
- Dates: December 9 – 12
- Winner: (Manitoba) Jeff Stoughton
- Curling club: Charleswood CC, Winnipeg
- Skip: Jeff Stoughton
- Third: Jon Mead
- Second: Garry Vandenberghe
- Lead: Steve Gould
- Finalist: (Saskatchewan) Pat Simmons

The 2004 M&M Meat Shops Masters of Curling was held from December 9 to 12, 2004 at the Elgar Petersen Arena in Humboldt, Saskatchewan. The event was one of the four men's Grand Slams of the 2004–05 curling season.

Winnipeg's Jeff Stoughton rink won the event, defeating Moose Jaw, Saskatchewan's Pat Simmons rink in the final, 5–4. Stoughton won the event by stealing a point in the 11th end, and took home $30,000 for the win. Simmons won $18,000. It was Stoughton's second career Grand Slam win.

The event had a triple knockout format. The top 12 teams (as of August 30) in the world qualified, plus the top 2 teams on the World Curling Tour money list (as of November 21), plus one European team and one sponsor exemption. The total purse for the event was $100,000. The WCT second ranked Glenn Howard rink and the fifth ranked Wayne Middaugh rink did not participate, as they were participating in the playdowns for the 2005 Ontario Kia Cup.

The semifinals and finals aired on Sportsnet.

== Teams ==
The teams were as follows:

Skip	Third	Second	Lead	Locale	WCT rank (earnings)
Dave Boehmer	Pat Spring	Richard Daneault	Don Harvey	Petersfield, Manitoba	6th ($30,200)
Kerry Burtnyk	Ken Tresoor	Rob Fowler	Keith Fenton	Winnipeg, Manitoba	37th ($12,000)
Mark Dacey	Bruce Lohnes	Rob Harris	Andrew Gibson	Halifax, Nova Scotia	101st ($3,287)
Glen Despins	Rod Montgomery	Phillip Germain	Dwayne Mihalicz	Regina, Saskatchewan	20th ($19,500)
David Nedohin	Randy Ferbey (skip)	Scott Pfeifer	Marcel Rocque	Edmonton, Alberta	3rd ($55,000)
Guy Hemmings	Martin Ferland	Francois Gagne	Dale Ness	Montreal, Quebec	41st ($10,488)
Russ Howard	James Grattan	Grant Odishaw	Marc LeCocq	Moncton, New Brunswick	7th ($30,000)
Bruce Korte	Clint Dieno	Roger Korte	Rory Golanowski	Muenster, Saskatchewan	87th ($4,000)
Kevin Martin	Don Walchuk	Carter Rycroft	Don Bartlett	Edmonton, Alberta	1st ($73,500)
John Morris	Kevin Koe	Marc Kennedy	Paul Moffatt	Calgary, Alberta	21st ($16,700)
Kevin Park	Shane Park	Kerry Park	Scott Park	Edmonton, Alberta	NR
Vic Peters	Mark Lukowich	Chris Neufeld	Denni Neufeld	Winnipeg, Manitoba	72nd ($5,200)
Pat Simmons	Jeff Sharp	Chris Haichert	Ben Hebert	Moose Jaw, Saskatchewan	4th ($43,500)
Ralph Stöckli	Claudio Pescia	Pascal Sieber	Simon Strübin	Neuenkirch, Switzerland	10th ($25,418)
Jeff Stoughton	Jon Mead	Garry Vandenberghe	Steve Gould	Winnipeg, Manitoba	8th ($28,250)
Bob Ursel	Trevor Perepolkin	Brendan Willis	Lance McGinn	Kelowna, British Columbia	11th ($24,000)

== Playoffs ==
The playoff scores were as follows:

Quarterfinals
(Saskatchewan) Pat Simmons	8
(Manitoba) Dave Boehmer	4
(Saskatchewan) Bruce Korte	11
(Alberta) Kevin Martin	6
(Manitoba) Jeff Stoughton	7
(Manitoba) Kerry Burtnyk	1
(Alberta) Kevin Park	6
(Alberta) Randy Ferbey	5

Semifinals
(Saskatchewan) Pat Simmons	9
(Saskatchewan) Bruce Korte	3
(Manitoba) Jeff Stoughton	9
(Alberta) Kevin Park	4

Finals
(Saskatchewan) Pat Simmons	4
(Manitoba) Jeff Stoughton	5
