= Mathew Harris =

Canadian curler

- Curler ♂
- Other names: Mat, Matt

Team
- Curling club: Mayflower CC, Halifax, NS

Curling career
- Member Association: Nova Scotia
- Brier: 3 (2001, 2004, 2006, 2009)
- World Championship: 1 (2004)
Medal record
Curling
Representing Canada
World Championships
Bronze medal – third place	2004 Gävle
Representing Nova Scotia
Tim Hortons Brier
Gold medal – first place	2004 Saskatoon
Bronze medal – third place	2006 Regina

Mathew "Mat" Harris is a Canadian curler.

He is a 2004 World Men's bronze medallist and a 2004 Nokia Brier champion as a member of Mark Dacey team.

== Teams ==
Season	Skip	Third	Second	Lead	Alternate	Coach	Events
1998–99	Mark Dacey	Rob Harris	Mathew Harris	Alan Cameron			
1999–00	Mark Dacey	Paul Flemming	Blayne Iskiw	Mathew Harris			
2000–01	Mark Dacey	Paul Flemming	Blayne Iskiw	Tom Fetterly	Mathew Harris		Brier 2001 (5th)
2003–04	Mark Dacey	Bruce Lohnes	Rob Harris	Andrew Gibson	Mathew Harris	Peter Corkum	Brier 2004 (gold); WCC 2004 (bronze)
2005–06	Mark Dacey	Bruce Lohnes	Rob Harris	Andrew Gibson	Mathew Harris	Peter Corkum	COCT 2005 (9th); Brier 2006 (bronze)
2008–09	Mark Dacey	Bruce Lohnes	Andrew Gibson	Kris Granchelli	Mat Harris	Peter Corkum	Brier 2009 (10th)
2013–14	Rob Harris	Ken Myers	Mathew Harris	Alan Cameron			

== Personal life ==
His brother Rob is a curler too, and played lead on the Mark Dacey Brier champion team (Mathew was many times the alternate on this team). Harris works as the Regional Managing Partner of Deloitte's Atlantic region. In 2015, he chaired the host committee at the 2015 World Men's Curling Championship.
