= Dan Holowaychuk =

Canadian curler

- Curler ♂
- Born: September 22, 1962 (age 64)

Team
- Curling club: Saville Community SC, Edmonton, AB

Curling career
- Member Association: Alberta
- Brier: 5: (2001, 2002, 2003, 2004, 2005)
- World Championship: 4 (2001, 2002, 2003, 2005)
- Other appearances: World Senior Championship: 2 (2018, 2022)
Medal record
Curling
Representing Canada
World Championships
Gold medal – first place	2002 Bismarck
Gold medal – first place	2003 Winnipeg
Gold medal – first place	2005 Victoria
World Senior Championships
Gold medal – first place	2018 Östersund
Gold medal – first place	2022 Geneva
Representing Alberta
Tim Hortons Brier
Gold medal – first place	2001 Ottawa
Gold medal – first place	2002 Calgary
Gold medal – first place	2003 Halifax
Gold medal – first place	2005 Edmonton
Silver medal – second place	2004 Saskatoon

Dan Holowaychuk (born September 22, 1962) is a Canadian curler from St. Albert, Alberta.

He is a three-time World Men's champion (2002, 2003, 2005) and a four-time Tim Hortons Brier champion (2001, 2002, 2003, 2005) as the alternate on the legendary "Ferbey Four" team.

As of 2002, he was employed as a business development manager. Earlier in his career he was a salesman for Catelli pasta.

== Teams ==
Season	Skip	Third	Second	Lead	Alternate	Coach	Events
1981–82	Bill Bruce	Dan Holowaychuk	Brian Mandrusiak	Michael Dunnigan			
1983–84	Len Erickson	Dan Holowaychuk	Jim Mudryk	Gordie Myagishima			
1986–87	Jim Laitt	Dan Holowaychuk	Gerry Paine	Kevin Pottruf			
1987–88	Jim Lait	Laurie Andrews	Dan Holowaychuk	Bob Cunningham			
1990–91	Dan Holowaychuk	Gerry Paine	Tom Silversides	Kevin Pettruff			
1992–93	Scott Park	Darren Fish	Dan Holowaychuk	Cliff Phillips			
1994–95	Dan Holowaychuk	Ken Tralnberg	Tom Silversides	George White			
1996–97	Les Rogers	Dan Holowaychuk	Dwight Alfrey	Jerry Semen			
1997–98	Mark Johnson	Ralph Brust	Dan Holowaychuk	Millard Evans			
1998–99	Mark Johnson	Scott Park	Dan Holowaychuk	Millard Evans			
1999–00	Mark Johnson	Marv Wirth	Dan Holowaychuk	Millard Evans			
2000–01	Rob Bucholz	Dan Holowaychuk	Jim Bucholz	Jim Wallbank			
2000–01	David Nedohin (fourth)	Randy Ferbey (skip)	Scott Pfeifer	Marcel Rocque	Dan Holowaychuk	Brian Moore	Brier 2001 (gold); WCC 2001 (4th)
2001–02	David Nedohin (fourth)	Randy Ferbey (skip)	Scott Pfeifer	Marcel Rocque	Dan Holowaychuk	Brian Moore	COCT 2001 (7th); Brier 2002 (gold); WCC 2002 (gold)
2002–03	Rob Bucholz	Dan Holowaychuk	Jim Bucholz	Jim Wallbank			
2002–03	David Nedohin (fourth)	Randy Ferbey (skip)	Scott Pfeifer	Marcel Rocque	Dan Holowaychuk	Brian Moore	Brier 2003 (gold); WCC 2003 (gold)
2003–04	David Nedohin (fourth)	Randy Ferbey (skip)	Scott Pfeifer	Marcel Rocque	Dan Holowaychuk	Brian Moore	Brier 2004 (silver)
2004–05	David Nedohin (fourth)	Randy Ferbey (skip)	Scott Pfeifer	Marcel Rocque	Dan Holowaychuk	Brian Moore	Brier 2005 (gold); WCC 2005 (gold)
2005–06	David Nedohin (fourth)	Randy Ferbey (skip)	Scott Pfeifer	Marcel Rocque	Dan Holowaychuk		COCT 2005 (7th)
2006–07	Wade White	Blayne Iskiw	Dan Holowaychuk	George White			
2007–08	Wade White	Blayne Iskiw	Dan Holowaychuk	George White			
2008–09	Wade White	Kevin Tym	Dan Holowaychuk	George White			
2009–10	David Nedohin (fourth)	Randy Ferbey (skip)	Scott Pfeifer	Marcel Rocque	Dan Holowaychuk		COCT 2009 (5th)
2010–11	Wade White	Kevin Tym	Dan Holowaychuk	George White			
2011–12	Wade White	Kevin Tym	Dan Holowaychuk	George White			
2012–13	Wade White	Kevin Tym	Dan Holowaychuk	George White			
2012–13	Wade White	Doug McLennan	Dan Holowaychuk	George Parsons			CSCC 2013 (bronze)
2013–14	Wade White	Kevin Tym	Dan Holowaychuk	George White			
2014–15	Wade White	Kevin Tym	Dan Holowaychuk	George Parsons	George White		
2015–16	Wade White	Kevin Tym	Dan Holowaychuk	George White			
2016–17	Wade White	Kevin Tym	Dan Holowaychuk	George White			
2017–18	Wade White	Kevin Tym	Dan Holowaychuk	George White			
2017–18	Wade White	Barry Chwedoruk	Dan Holowaychuk	George White		Bill Tschirhart (WSCC)	CSCC 2018 (6th); WSCC 2018 (gold)
2018–19	Wade White	Barry Chwedoruk	Dan Holowaychuk	George White			CSCC 2019 (bronze)
2019–20	Wade White	Barry Chwedoruk	Dan Holowaychuk	George White			
2021–22	Wade White	Barry Chwedoruk	Dan Holowaychuk	George White			CSCC 2021 (gold); WSCC 2022 (gold)
