= 2003 Nokia Brier =

- Host city: Halifax, Nova Scotia
- Arena: Halifax Metro Centre
- Dates: March 1–9
- Attendance: 158,414
- Winner: Alberta
- Curling club: Avonair CC, Edmonton
- Skip: Randy Ferbey
- Fourth: David Nedohin
- Second: Scott Pfeifer
- Lead: Marcel Rocque
- Alternate: Dan Holowaychuk
- Coach: Brian Moore
- Finalist: Nova Scotia (Mark Dacey)

The 2003 Nokia Brier, the Canadian men's curling championship, was held from March 1 to 9 at the Halifax Metro Centre in Halifax, Nova Scotia. The defending champion, Randy Ferbey and his team from Alberta were the winners, winning their third Brier in a row. At the Worlds they went on to represent Canada and win the gold medal.

The event was the second and final Brier to be boycotted by many of the top teams in the country, such as Kevin Martin, Glenn Howard, Wayne Middaugh and Jeff Stoughton, who were protesting a lack of prize money. The boycott ended in September.

== Teams ==
The teams were listed as follows:

Alberta	British Columbia	Manitoba	New Brunswick
Avonair CC, Edmonton Fourth: David Nedohin; Skip: Randy Ferbey; Second: Scott Pfeifer; Lead: Marcel Rocque (Note: Team Alberta alternate Dan Holowaychuk threw lead stones in Draw 16.); Alternate: Dan Holowaychuk	Kelowna CC, Kelowna Skip: Pat Ryan; Third: Bob Ursel; Second: Deane Horning; Lead: Kevin MacKenzie; Alternate: Rob Koffski	Granite CC, Winnipeg Skip: John Bubbs; Third: Bob Jenion; Second: Bob Scales; Lead: Dan Kelsch; Alternate: Ron Westcott	Beaver CC, Moncton Skip: Russ Howard; Third: James Grattan; Second: Marc LeCocq; Lead: Grant Odishaw; Alternate: Kevin Boyle
Newfoundland and Labrador	Northern Ontario	Nova Scotia	Ontario
St. John's CC, St. John's Skip: Brad Gushue; Third: Mark Nichols; Second: Jamie Korab; Lead: Mark Ward; Alternate: Mike Adam	Fort William CC, Thunder Bay Skip: Scott Henderson; Third: Art Lappalainen; Second: Mike Desilets; Lead: Tim Lindsay; Alternate: Rick Lang	Mayflower CC, Halifax Skip: Mark Dacey; Third: Bruce Lohnes; Second: Rob Harris; Lead: Andrew Gibson; Alternate: Steve Gibson	RCMP CC, Ottawa Skip: Bryan Cochrane; Third: Bill Gamble; Second: Ian MacAulay; Lead: John Steski; Alternate: Douglas Johnston
Prince Edward Island	Quebec	Saskatchewan	Yukon/Northwest Territories
Charlottetown CC, Charlottetown Skip: Robert Campbell; Third: Kevin Champion; Second: Philip Gorveatt; Lead: Mike Dillon; Alternate: David Campbell	St. Lambert CC, Saint-Lambert Skip: Guy Hemmings; Third: Don Westphal; Second: Jean-Michel Ménard; Lead: Dale Ness; Alternate: André Lafleur	Humboldt CC, Humboldt Skip: Doug Harcourt; Third: Kevin Kalthoff; Second: Greg Harcourt; Lead: Brian Wempe; Alternate: Dean Kleiter	Whitehorse CC, Whitehorse Skip: Chad Cowan; Third: Doug Bryant; Second: James Buyck; Lead: Ross Milward; Alternate: Bernie Adilman

== Map of teams ==
Provincial Winners

== Round robin standings ==
Final round robin standings

Key
Teams to Playoffs

Locale	Skip	W	L	W–L	PF	PA	EW	EL	BE	SE	S%
Alberta	Randy Ferbey	11	0	–	90	57	49	41	3	12	87%
British Columbia	Pat Ryan	7	4	2–0	69	58	46	40	8	14	84%
Nova Scotia	Mark Dacey	7	4	1–1	68	69	42	44	3	4	79%
New Brunswick	Russ Howard	7	4	0–2	78	61	45	43	6	8	87%
Newfoundland and Labrador	Brad Gushue	6	5	1–0	64	61	44	38	7	15	83%
Quebec	Guy Hemmings	6	5	0–1	70	59	46	41	3	14	83%
Northern Ontario	Scott Henderson	5	6	2–0	63	75	44	45	11	10	79%
Saskatchewan	Doug Harcourt	5	6	1–1	61	68	42	48	11	6	84%
Ontario	Bryan Cochrane	5	6	0–2	69	71	42	46	4	8	82%
Manitoba	John Bubbs	3	8	1–0	54	69	40	46	12	6	81%
Yukon/Northwest Territories	Chad Cowan	3	8	0–1	64	73	47	48	9	8	79%
Prince Edward Island	Robert Campbell	1	10	–	57	86	39	46	4	4	81%

== Round robin results ==
All draw times are listed in Atlantic Standard Time (UTC−4).

=== Draw 1 ===
Saturday, March 1, 3:00 pm

Sheet A	1	2	3	4	5	6	7	8	9	10	Final
Alberta (Ferbey)	1	0	2	0	2	0	0	5	X	X	10
Nova Scotia (Dacey) 🔨	0	1	0	1	0	1	1	0	X	X	4

Sheet B	1	2	3	4	5	6	7	8	9	10	11	Final
Yukon/Northwest Territories (Cowan)	0	0	1	1	1	0	1	0	0	1	0	5
Northern Ontario (Henderson) 🔨	2	0	0	0	0	2	0	1	0	0	1	6

Sheet C	1	2	3	4	5	6	7	8	9	10	Final
Saskatchewan (Harcourt)	0	0	0	0	2	0	0	3	0	0	5
Newfoundland and Labrador (Gushue) 🔨	1	0	0	1	0	0	1	0	2	1	6

Sheet D	1	2	3	4	5	6	7	8	9	10	Final
Manitoba (Bubbs)	0	1	0	0	1	0	0	2	0	X	4
New Brunswick (Howard) 🔨	2	0	2	0	0	0	1	0	1	X	6

=== Draw 2 ===
Saturday, March 1, 8:00 pm

Sheet A	1	2	3	4	5	6	7	8	9	10	Final
Newfoundland and Labrador (Gushue) 🔨	2	0	2	0	0	1	0	0	1	0	6
Yukon/Northwest Territories (Cowan)	0	1	0	2	0	0	1	2	0	1	7

Sheet B	1	2	3	4	5	6	7	8	9	10	Final
Quebec (Hemmings)	0	0	1	0	0	1	0	1	1	X	4
Prince Edward Island (Campbell) 🔨	0	1	0	3	1	0	1	0	0	X	6

Sheet C	1	2	3	4	5	6	7	8	9	10	Final
Ontario (Cochrane)	0	0	1	0	0	1	2	0	1	0	5
British Columbia (Ryan) 🔨	0	2	0	1	1	0	0	2	0	1	7

Sheet D	1	2	3	4	5	6	7	8	9	10	Final
Saskatchewan (Harcourt) 🔨	1	0	2	1	0	0	0	1	0	0	5
Northern Ontario (Henderson)	0	1	0	0	0	2	1	0	2	2	8

=== Draw 3 ===
Sunday, March 2, 9:00 am

Sheet B	1	2	3	4	5	6	7	8	9	10	Final
New Brunswick (Howard) 🔨	2	0	1	0	1	1	0	0	2	0	7
Alberta (Ferbey)	0	1	0	3	0	0	1	2	0	1	8

Sheet C	1	2	3	4	5	6	7	8	9	10	Final
Manitoba (Bubbs) 🔨	0	1	0	0	2	0	1	0	2	0	6
Nova Scotia (Dacey)	0	0	2	0	0	1	0	1	0	3	7

=== Draw 4 ===
Sunday, March 2, 3:00 pm

Sheet A	1	2	3	4	5	6	7	8	9	10	Final
Prince Edward Island (Campbell) 🔨	0	1	1	0	0	3	0	2	0	X	7
Ontario (Cochrane)	0	0	0	4	1	0	5	0	2	X	12

Sheet B	1	2	3	4	5	6	7	8	9	10	Final
Northern Ontario (Henderson) 🔨	1	0	2	0	0	0	1	0	0	0	4
Newfoundland and Labrador (Gushue)	0	1	0	2	1	1	0	0	0	1	6

Sheet C	1	2	3	4	5	6	7	8	9	10	Final
Yukon/Northwest Territories (Cowan) 🔨	0	2	0	1	0	1	0	1	1	X	6
Saskatchewan (Harcourt)	0	0	1	0	1	0	1	0	0	X	3

Sheet D	1	2	3	4	5	6	7	8	9	10	Final
Quebec (Hemmings) 🔨	0	1	0	2	2	1	0	1	1	X	8
British Columbia (Ryan)	1	0	1	0	0	0	1	0	0	X	3

=== Draw 5 ===
Sunday, March 2, 8:00 pm

Sheet A	1	2	3	4	5	6	7	8	9	10	Final
Nova Scotia (Dacey) 🔨	1	2	0	1	0	2	0	1	0	1	8
New Brunswick (Howard)	0	0	1	0	3	0	2	0	1	0	7

Sheet B	1	2	3	4	5	6	7	8	9	10	Final
Ontario (Cochrane) 🔨	1	0	1	0	4	0	1	0	X	X	7
Quebec (Hemmings)	0	0	0	1	0	1	0	1	X	X	3

Sheet C	1	2	3	4	5	6	7	8	9	10	Final
British Columbia (Ryan) 🔨	2	0	2	1	0	1	0	2	0	1	9
Prince Edward Island (Campbell)	0	1	0	0	3	0	2	0	2	0	8

Sheet D	1	2	3	4	5	6	7	8	9	10	Final
Alberta (Ferbey) 🔨	0	1	0	0	4	0	1	3	X	X	9
Manitoba (Bubbs)	1	0	0	1	0	1	0	0	X	X	3

=== Draw 6 ===
Monday, March 3, 9:00 am

Sheet A	1	2	3	4	5	6	7	8	9	10	Final
Manitoba (Bubbs) 🔨	1	0	0	1	0	1	0	1	0	0	4
Saskatchewan (Harcourt)	0	0	2	0	1	0	1	0	0	2	6

Sheet B	1	2	3	4	5	6	7	8	9	10	Final
New Brunswick (Howard) 🔨	0	3	0	2	0	2	0	2	0	X	9
Yukon/Northwest Territories (Cowan)	0	0	3	0	1	0	2	0	1	X	7

Sheet C	1	2	3	4	5	6	7	8	9	10	Final
Alberta (Ferbey) 🔨	0	0	0	1	1	1	0	0	2	X	5
Newfoundland and Labrador (Gushue)	0	1	1	0	0	0	0	1	0	X	3

Sheet D	1	2	3	4	5	6	7	8	9	10	Final
Nova Scotia (Dacey) 🔨	3	0	0	0	0	3	0	2	0	X	8
Northern Ontario (Henderson)	0	0	2	0	1	0	1	0	0	X	4

=== Draw 7 ===
Monday, March 3, 3:00 pm

Sheet A	1	2	3	4	5	6	7	8	9	10	Final
Yukon/Northwest Territories (Cowan) 🔨	1	0	1	0	2	0	0	0	0	X	4
British Columbia (Ryan)	0	1	0	3	0	1	1	0	1	X	7

Sheet B	1	2	3	4	5	6	7	8	9	10	Final
Saskatchewan (Harcourt) 🔨	0	0	2	0	1	0	2	0	0	1	6
Prince Edward Island (Campbell)	0	0	0	2	0	1	0	2	0	0	5

Sheet C	1	2	3	4	5	6	7	8	9	10	Final
Northern Ontario (Henderson) 🔨	0	0	3	0	0	3	0	1	0	1	8
Ontario (Cochrane)	0	1	0	1	2	0	1	0	1	0	6

Sheet D	1	2	3	4	5	6	7	8	9	10	Final
Newfoundland and Labrador (Gushue) 🔨	2	0	2	1	0	0	1	1	X	X	7
Quebec (Hemmings)	0	1	0	0	0	2	0	0	X	X	3

=== Draw 8 ===
Monday, March 3, 8:00 pm

Sheet A	1	2	3	4	5	6	7	8	9	10	Final
Quebec (Hemmings) 🔨	1	0	1	2	0	1	0	0	2	0	7
Alberta (Ferbey)	0	2	0	0	2	0	1	1	0	3	9

Sheet B	1	2	3	4	5	6	7	8	9	10	Final
Ontario (Cochrane) 🔨	3	0	2	0	0	2	0	2	0	X	9
Nova Scotia (Dacey)	0	1	0	2	0	0	2	0	2	X	7

Sheet C	1	2	3	4	5	6	7	8	9	10	Final
Prince Edward Island (Campbell) 🔨	1	0	0	0	0	1	0	0	1	0	3
Manitoba (Bubbs)	0	0	1	0	0	0	0	2	0	1	4

Sheet D	1	2	3	4	5	6	7	8	9	10	Final
British Columbia (Ryan) 🔨	0	0	2	0	1	0	2	1	X	X	6
New Brunswick (Howard)	0	0	0	1	0	1	0	0	X	X	2

=== Draw 9 ===
Tuesday, March 4, 9:00 am

Sheet A	1	2	3	4	5	6	7	8	9	10	Final
Prince Edward Island (Campbell) 🔨	1	0	1	0	1	0	1	0	X	X	4
Nova Scotia (Dacey)	0	2	0	3	0	1	0	3	X	X	9

Sheet B	1	2	3	4	5	6	7	8	9	10	Final
British Columbia (Ryan) 🔨	1	0	2	0	0	1	0	0	X	X	4
Alberta (Ferbey)	0	2	0	3	1	0	2	0	X	X	8

Sheet C	1	2	3	4	5	6	7	8	9	10	Final
Quebec (Hemmings) 🔨	1	2	0	0	1	0	3	0	0	X	7
New Brunswick (Howard)	0	0	1	1	0	1	0	0	1	X	4

Sheet D	1	2	3	4	5	6	7	8	9	10	Final
Ontario (Cochrane) 🔨	1	0	0	3	0	1	0	1	0	X	6
Manitoba (Bubbs)	0	0	1	0	1	0	1	0	0	X	3

=== Draw 10 ===
Tuesday, March 4, 3:00 pm

Sheet A	1	2	3	4	5	6	7	8	9	10	Final
New Brunswick (Howard) 🔨	3	0	0	2	0	2	0	2	X	X	9
Northern Ontario (Henderson)	0	0	1	0	1	0	1	0	X	X	3

Sheet B	1	2	3	4	5	6	7	8	9	10	Final
Manitoba (Bubbs) 🔨	0	0	3	1	0	0	1	0	0	X	5
Newfoundland and Labrador (Gushue)	1	2	0	0	1	1	0	2	0	X	7

Sheet C	1	2	3	4	5	6	7	8	9	10	11	Final
Nova Scotia (Dacey) 🔨	1	0	0	0	2	0	1	1	0	0	1	6
Yukon/Northwest Territories (Cowan)	0	0	1	1	0	1	0	0	1	1	0	5

Sheet D	1	2	3	4	5	6	7	8	9	10	Final
Alberta (Ferbey) 🔨	2	0	2	0	1	1	0	2	0	X	8
Saskatchewan (Harcourt)	0	2	0	1	0	0	1	0	2	X	6

=== Draw 11 ===
Tuesday, March 4, 8:00 pm

Sheet A	1	2	3	4	5	6	7	8	9	10	Final
Newfoundland and Labrador (Gushue) 🔨	1	0	1	0	2	1	0	2	0	X	7
Ontario (Cochrane)	0	1	0	1	0	0	2	0	0	X	4

Sheet B	1	2	3	4	5	6	7	8	9	10	Final
Northern Ontario (Henderson) 🔨	0	0	0	3	0	1	0	0	X	X	4
Quebec (Hemmings)	0	0	2	0	3	0	2	2	X	X	9

Sheet C	1	2	3	4	5	6	7	8	9	10	Final
Saskatchewan (Harcourt) 🔨	1	0	0	1	1	0	3	0	0	2	8
British Columbia (Ryan)	0	2	1	0	0	2	0	0	2	0	7

Sheet D	1	2	3	4	5	6	7	8	9	10	Final
Yukon/Northwest Territories (Cowan) 🔨	0	1	0	2	0	0	0	3	0	1	7
Prince Edward Island (Campbell)	0	0	1	0	1	0	01	0	1	0	4

=== Draw 12 ===
Wednesday, March 5, 9:00 am

Sheet A	1	2	3	4	5	6	7	8	9	10	Final
Saskatchewan (Harcourt) 🔨	0	1	1	0	0	0	1	0	0	2	5
Quebec (Hemmings)	0	0	0	1	1	1	0	1	0	0	4

Sheet B	1	2	3	4	5	6	7	8	9	10	Final
Yukon/Northwest Territories (Cowan) 🔨	0	2	0	0	1	2	0	0	1	0	6
Ontario (Cochrane)	0	0	1	1	0	0	2	1	0	2	7

Sheet C	1	2	3	4	5	6	7	8	9	10	Final
Newfoundland and Labrador (Gushue) 🔨	4	0	5	0	1	0	X	X	X	X	10
Prince Edward Island (Campbell)	0	1	0	1	0	1	X	X	X	X	3

Sheet D	1	2	3	4	5	6	7	8	9	10	Final
Northern Ontario (Henderson) 🔨	1	0	1	0	2	0	0	1	1	1	7
British Columbia (Ryan)	0	3	0	1	0	3	1	0	0	0	8

=== Draw 13 ===
Wednesday, March 5, 3:00 pm

Sheet A	1	2	3	4	5	6	7	8	9	10	Final
British Columbia (Ryan) 🔨	0	1	0	0	0	1	0	2	0	X	4
Manitoba (Bubbs)	1	0	0	0	1	0	2	0	2	X	6

Sheet B	1	2	3	4	5	6	7	8	9	10	Final
Prince Edward Island (Campbell) 🔨	2	0	0	0	0	1	X	X	X	X	3
New Brunswick (Howard)	0	1	1	2	5	0	X	X	X	X	9

Sheet C	1	2	3	4	5	6	7	8	9	10	Final
Ontario (Cochrane) 🔨	1	0	0	0	0	0	0	2	0	X	3
Alberta (Ferbey)	0	1	3	0	1	0	1	0	1	X	7

Sheet D	1	2	3	4	5	6	7	8	9	10	Final
Quebec (Hemmings) 🔨	3	1	0	2	0	0	2	X	X	X	8
Nova Scotia (Dacey)	0	0	2	0	1	0	0	X	X	X	3

=== Draw 14 ===
Wednesday, March 5, 8:00 pm

Sheet A	1	2	3	4	5	6	7	8	9	10	Final
Alberta (Ferbey) 🔨	2	0	3	0	2	0	0	1	0	1	9
Yukon/Northwest Territories (Cowan)	0	3	0	2	0	1	0	0	2	0	8

Sheet B	1	2	3	4	5	6	7	8	9	10	11	Final
Nova Scotia (Dacey) 🔨	1	0	0	1	0	2	0	2	0	0	1	7
Saskatchewan (Harcourt)	0	1	1	0	1	0	2	0	0	1	0	6

Sheet C	1	2	3	4	5	6	7	8	9	10	Final
Manitoba (Bubbs) 🔨	0	0	1	0	1	0	2	1	0	0	5
Northern Ontario (Henderson)	1	0	0	2	0	2	0	0	2	1	8

Sheet D	1	2	3	4	5	6	7	8	9	10	Final
New Brunswick (Howard) 🔨	3	0	0	1	0	0	1	0	0	3	8
Newfoundland and Labrador (Gushue)	0	1	0	0	2	1	0	1	1	0	6

=== Draw 15 ===
Thursday, March 6, 9:00 am

Sheet A	1	2	3	4	5	6	7	8	9	10	11	Final
Northern Ontario (Henderson) 🔨	1	1	1	0	0	0	2	0	1	0	1	7
Prince Edward Island (Campbell)	0	0	0	2	0	0	0	3	0	1	0	6

Sheet B	1	2	3	4	5	6	7	8	9	10	Final
Newfoundland and Labrador (Gushue) 🔨	0	0	1	0	0	0	X	X	X	X	1
British Columbia (Ryan)	2	1	0	2	2	2	X	X	X	X	9

Sheet C	1	2	3	4	5	6	7	8	9	10	Final
Yukon/Northwest Territories (Cowan) 🔨	1	0	0	1	0	2	0	0	1	X	5
Quebec (Hemmings)	0	3	1	0	3	0	1	0	0	X	8

Sheet D	1	2	3	4	5	6	7	8	9	10	Final
Saskatchewan (Harcourt) 🔨	0	0	2	0	2	1	0	3	X	X	8
Ontario (Cochrane)	0	2	0	1	0	0	1	0	X	X	4

=== Draw 16 ===
Thursday, March 6, 3:00 pm

Sheet A	1	2	3	4	5	6	7	8	9	10	Final
Nova Scotia (Dacey) 🔨	0	1	0	4	2	0	0	0	0	1	8
Newfoundland and Labrador (Gushue)	1	0	3	0	0	0	0	1	0	0	5

Sheet B	1	2	3	4	5	6	7	8	9	10	Final
Alberta (Ferbey) 🔨	0	3	0	2	1	0	0	0	2	X	8
Northern Ontario (Henderson)	1	0	2	0	0	0	0	1	0	X	4

Sheet C	1	2	3	4	5	6	7	8	9	10	Final
New Brunswick (Howard) 🔨	1	0	0	1	1	1	0	0	5	X	9
Saskatchewan (Harcourt)	0	1	1	0	0	0	1	0	0	X	3

Sheet D	1	2	3	4	5	6	7	8	9	10	Final
Manitoba (Bubbs) 🔨	1	0	1	0	0	1	2	0	3	X	8
Yukon/Northwest Territories (Cowan)	0	1	0	1	1	0	0	1	0	X	4

=== Draw 17 ===
Thursday, March 6, 8:00 pm

Sheet A	1	2	3	4	5	6	7	8	9	10	Final
Ontario (Cochrane) 🔨	1	0	0	0	1	0	3	0	1	0	6
New Brunswick (Howard)	0	0	1	1	0	3	0	2	0	1	8

Sheet B	1	2	3	4	5	6	7	8	9	10	Final
Quebec (Hemmings) 🔨	0	2	0	1	0	2	0	1	1	2	9
Manitoba (Bubbs)	1	0	2	0	1	0	2	0	0	0	6

Sheet C	1	2	3	4	5	6	7	8	9	10	Final
British Columbia (Ryan) 🔨	0	0	1	0	0	1	0	2	1	X	5
Nova Scotia (Dacey)	0	0	0	1	0	0	0	0	0	X	1

Sheet D	1	2	3	4	5	6	7	8	9	10	Final
Prince Edward Island (Campbell) 🔨	2	1	0	1	0	1	0	3	0	0	8
Alberta (Ferbey)	0	0	3	0	3	0	1	0	0	2	9

== Playoffs ==
Page playoff system
1	Alberta	8
2	British Columbia	2
3	Nova Scotia	6
4	New Brunswick	4

Semifinal
2	British Columbia	6
3	Nova Scotia	9

Final
1	Alberta	7
3	Nova Scotia	4

=== 3 vs. 4 ===
Friday, March 7, 3:00 pm

Sheet C	1	2	3	4	5	6	7	8	9	10	Final
Nova Scotia (Dacey) 🔨	0	0	1	0	3	0	1	0	1	X	6
New Brunswick (Howard)	0	1	0	1	0	1	0	1	0	X	4

Player percentages
Nova Scotia		New Brunswick	
Andrew Gibson	80%	Grant Odishaw	89%
Rob Harris	75%	Marc LeCocq	76%
Bruce Lohnes	81%	James Grattan	81%
Mark Dacey	75%	Russ Howard	75%
Total	78%	Total	80%

=== 1 vs. 2 ===
Friday, March 7, 8:00 pm

Sheet C	1	2	3	4	5	6	7	8	9	10	Final
Alberta (Ferbey) 🔨	1	1	0	3	2	1	0	X	X	X	8
British Columbia (Ryan)	0	0	1	0	0	0	1	X	X	X	2

Player percentages
Alberta		British Columbia	
Marcel Rocque	96%	Kevin MacKenzie	89%
Scott Pfeifer	92%	Deane Horning	96%
Randy Ferbey	84%	Bob Ursel	82%
David Nedohin	96%	Pat Ryan	64%
Total	92%	Total	83%

=== Semifinal ===
Saturday, March 8, 2:30 pm

Sheet C	1	2	3	4	5	6	7	8	9	10	Final
British Columbia (Ryan) 🔨	0	2	0	1	0	0	2	0	1	X	6
Nova Scotia (Dacey)	2	0	1	0	1	1	0	4	0	X	9

Player percentages
British Columbia		Nova Scotia	
Kevin MacKenzie	88%	Andrew Gibson	86%
Deane Horning	89%	Rob Harris	81%
Bob Ursel	78%	Bruce Lohnes	90%
Pat Ryan	78%	Mark Dacey	81%
Total	83%	Total	85%

=== Final ===
Sunday, March 9, 7:00 pm

Sheet C	1	2	3	4	5	6	7	8	9	10	Final
Alberta (Ferbey) 🔨	1	0	1	0	1	0	2	1	2	X	8
Nova Scotia (Dacey)	0	2	0	1	0	1	0	0	0	X	4

Player percentages
Alberta		Nova Scotia	
Marcel Rocque	88%	Andrew Gibson	85%
Scott Pfeifer	86%	Rob Harris	78%
Randy Ferbey	86%	Bruce Lohnes	83%
David Nedohin	96%	Mark Dacey	76%
Total	89%	Total	81%

== Statistics ==
=== Top 5 player percentages ===
Round Robin only

Key
First All-Star Team
Second All-Star Team

Leads	%
(Saskatchewan) Brian Wempe	91
(Alberta) Marcel Rocque	91
(New Brunswick) Grant Odishaw	90
(Newfoundland and Labrador) Mark Ward	90
(British Columbia) Kevin MacKenzie	89

Seconds	%
(Alberta) Scott Pfeifer	87
(Quebec) Jean-Michel Ménard	86
(New Brunswick) Marc LeCocq	86
(Saskatchewan) Greg Harcourt	84
(British Columbia) Dean Horning	84

Thirds	%
(Alberta) Randy Ferbey (Skip)	86
(New Brunswick) James Grattan	84
(Saskatchewan) Kevin Kalthoff	82
(British Columbia) Bob Ursel	82
(Manitoba) Bob Jenion	81
(Ontario) Bill Gamble	81

Skips	%
(New Brunswick) Russ Howard	85
(Alberta) David Nedohin	83
(Newfoundland and Labrador) Brad Gushue	82
(Prince Edward Island) Robert Campbell	81
(Quebec) Guy Hemmings	81
(British Columbia) Pat Ryan	81

== Awards ==
=== All-Star teams ===
The All-Star Teams were as follows:

First Team
Position	Name	Team
Skip	David Nedohin (Fourth) (2)	Alberta
Third	Randy Ferbey (Skip) (3)	Alberta
Second	Scott Pfeifer (2)	Alberta
Lead	Marcel Rocque	Alberta

Second Team
Position	Name	Team
Skip	Russ Howard	New Brunswick
Third	James Grattan (2)	New Brunswick
Second	Marc LeCocq	New Brunswick
Lead	Brian Wempe	Saskatchewan

=== Ross Harstone Sportsmanship Award ===
The Ross Harstone Sportsmanship Award is presented to the player chosen by their fellow peers as the curler who best represented Harstone's high ideals of good sportsmanship, observance of the rules, exemplary conduct and curling ability.

Name	Position	Team
Bob Jenion	Third	Manitoba

=== Hec Gervais Most Valuable Player Award ===
The Hec Gervais Most Valuable Player Award was awarded to the top player in the playoff round by members of the media.

Name	Position	Team
David Nedohin (3)	Fourth	Alberta
