= 2010 Canadian Mixed Curling Championship =

- Host city: Burlington, Ontario
- Arena: Burlington Golf and Country Club
- Dates: November 14–21, 2009
- Winner: Nova Scotia
- Curling club: Mayflower CC, Halifax
- Skip: Mark Dacey
- Third: Heather Smith-Dacey
- Second: Andrew Gibson
- Lead: Jill Mouzar
- Finalist: Ontario

The 2010 Canadian Mixed Curling Championship was held Nov. 14–21, 2009 at the Burlington Golf and Country Club in Burlington, Ontario. Nova Scotia won its seventh Mixed title, and skip Mark Dacey won his second title with then-wife, Heather Smith-Dacey as his mate who won her third. The team's front end of Andrew Gibson and Jill Mouzar won their first mixed title.

Dacey and Smith-Dacey were scheduled to represent Canada at the 2010 World Mixed Doubles Curling Championship, but were not able to make it to the event due to the 2010 eruptions of Eyjafjallajökull.

== Teams ==
Locale	Skip	Third	Second	Lead
Alberta	Graham Powell	Karen Powell	Todd Maxwell	Michelle Trarback
British Columbia	Jason Montgomery	Sarah Wark	Will Duggan	Nicole Montgomery
Manitoba	Dave Boehmer	Kerri Flett	Kyle Einarson	Tamara Bauknecht
New Brunswick	Mary Jane McGuire	Jeremy Mallais	Megan McGuire	Jared Bezanson
Newfoundland and Labrador	Matt Blandford	Stephanie LeDrew	Kelly Schuh	Jessica Mouland
Northern Ontario	Jordan Chandler	Tracy Horgan	Clint Cudmore	Lindsay Miners
Nova Scotia	Mark Dacey	Heather Smith-Dacey	Andrew Gibson	Jill Mouzar
Ontario	Mark Bice	Leslie Bishop	Codey Maus	Courtney Davies
Prince Edward Island	Kyle Stevenson	Donna Butler	Doug MacGregor	Tricia Affleck
Quebec	Simon Hébert	Noémie Verreault	William Dion	Vicky Tremblay
Saskatchewan	Jason Ackerman	Lana Vey	Andrew Foreman	Colleen Ackerman
Yukon/Northwest Territories	Wade Scoffin	Helen Strong	Steve Fecteau	Rhonda Horte

== Standings ==
Team	W	L
Nova Scotia	9	2
Ontario	9	2
British Columbia	8	3
Manitoba	8	3
Saskatchewan	5	6
Prince Edward Island	5	6
Newfoundland and Labrador	5	6
Alberta	5	6
Quebec	4	7
New Brunswick	4	7
Northern Ontario	3	8
Yukon/Northwest Territories	1	10

== Results ==
Draw 1

- Quebec 12-6 Saskatchewan
- New Brunswick 9-4 Yukon/Northwest Territories
- Prince Edward Island 8-5 Newfoundland and Labrador
- Manitoba 8-4 Ontario

Draw 2

- Northern Ontario 7-6 Alberta
- New Brunswick 9-4 Saskatchewan
- Prince Edward Island 8-5 Nova Scotia

Draw 3

- Nova Scotia 7-5 British Columbia
- Ontario 7-5 Quebec
- Alberta 7-6 Manitoba (11)
- Newfoundland and Labrador 10-4 Northern Ontario

Draw 4

- Prince Edward Island 6-5 New Brunswick (11)
- Ontario 10-4 British Columbia
- Yukon/Northwest Territories 7-2 Quebec

Draw 5

- Quebec 8-7 Newfoundland and Labrador (11)
- New Brunswick 4-3 Nova Scotia
- Northern Ontario 11-4 Prince Edward Island
- British Columbia 6-4 Manitoba

Draw 6

- Nova Scotia 6-3 Saskatchewan
- Ontario 8-6 Yukon/Northwest Territories
- Manitoba 8-3 Newfoundland and Labrador
- Alberta 7-3 New Brunswick

Draw 7

- Northern Ontario 6-1 Yukon/Northwest Territories
- British Columbia 8-6 Quebec (11)
- Saskatchewan 9-4 Alberta
- Ontario 7-4 Prince Edward Island

Draw 8

- Ontario 7-3 Saskatchewan
- Alberta 9-7 Yukon/Northwest Territories
- Manitoba 9-3 Quebec
- New Brunswick 8-7 Northern Ontario (11)

Draw 9

- British Columbia 10-7 Northern Ontario
- Prince Edward Island 9-2 Quebec
- Nova Scotia 7-4 Alberta
- Ontario 7-2 Newfoundland and Labrador

Draw 10

- Newfoundland and Labrador 7-6 New Brunswick
- Nova Scotia 5-2 Manitoba
- Prince Edward Island 8-2 Yukon/Northwest Territories
- British Columbia 7-5 Saskatchewan

Draw 11

- Manitoba 10-3 Yukon/Northwest Territories
- Newfoundland and Labrador 8-2 British Columbia
- Ontario 8-7 Northern Ontario (11)
- Alberta 7-6 Quebec

Draw 12

- Alberta 5-4 Prince Edward Island
- Saskatchewan 8-7 Northern Ontario (11)
- British Columbia 9-6 New Brunswick
- Nova Scotia 9-3 Yukon/Northwest Territories

Draw 13

- Nova Scotia 7-1 Quebec
- Ontario 7-2 New Brunswick
- Saskatchewan 8-4 Newfoundland and Labrador
- Manitoba 7-4 Prince Edward Island

Draw 14

- Ontario 9-8 Alberta
- Saskatchewan 6-4 Prince Edward Island
- British Columbia 11-2 Yukon/Northwest Territories
- Nova Scotia 6-3 Newfoundland and Labrador

Draw 15

- British Columbia 6-2 Prince Edward Island
- Manitoba 8-5 Northern Ontario
- Quebec 6-4 New Brunswick
- Saskatchewan 10-6 Yukon/Northwest Territories

Draw 16

- Manitoba 5-4 New Brunswick
- Newfoundland and Labrador 7-5 Alberta
- Quebec 8-7 Northern Ontario (11)
- Nova Scotia 8-7 Ontario (11)

Draw 17

- Newfoundland and Labrador 7-6 Yukon/Northwest Territories (11)
- Manitoba 7-6 Saskatchewan
- Nova Scotia 9-6 Northern Ontario
- British Columbia 6-4 Alberta

== Playoffs ==
Tie breaker		Semi final		Final
British Columbia	10
Manitoba	9	Ontario	12
		British Columbia	3
				Nova Scotia	7
				Ontario	5

== Sources ==
- Official site
