= 2004 Nokia Brier =

- Host city: Saskatoon, Saskatchewan
- Arena: Saskatchewan Place
- Dates: March 6–14
- Attendance: 238,129
- Winner: Nova Scotia
- Curling club: Mayflower CC, Halifax
- Skip: Mark Dacey
- Third: Bruce Lohnes
- Second: Rob Harris
- Lead: Andrew Gibson
- Alternate: Mathew Harris
- Coach: Peter Corkum
- Finalist: Alberta (Randy Ferbey)

The 2004 Nokia Brier, the Canadian men's curling championship was held from March 6 to 14, 2004 at Saskatchewan Place in Saskatoon, Saskatchewan. A total of 238,129 attended the event.

Team Nova Scotia, who was skipped by Mark Dacey defeated Team Alberta skipped by Randy Ferbey in dramatic fashion in the championship game and preventing the Ferbey rink for capturing their fourth consecutive Brier title. Nova Scotia's title was their third and to date most recent Brier Tankard title and first title since 1951.

== Teams ==
The teams were listed as follows:

Alberta	British Columbia	Manitoba	New Brunswick
Ottewell CC, Edmonton Fourth: David Nedohin; Skip: Randy Ferbey (Note: For the final four ends of Draw 16, Team Alberta's alternate Dan Holowaychuk threw second stones, second Scott Pfeifer threw third stones, while skip Randy Ferbey (who throws third stones) sat out.); Second: Scott Pfeifer; Lead: Marcel Rocque; Alternate: Dan Holowaychuk	Royal City CC, New Westminster Skip: Jay Peachey; Third: Ron Leech; Second: Kevin Recksiedler; Lead: Brad Fenton; Alternate: Jamie Smith	Swan River CC, Swan River Skip: Brent Scales; Third: Gord Hardy; Second: Grant Spicer (Note: Team Manitoba alternate Doug Harrison threw second stones in Draw 17.); Lead: Todd Trevellyan; Alternate: Doug Harrison	Beaver CC, Moncton Skip: Russ Howard; Third: James Grattan; Second: Marc LeCocq; Lead: Grant Odishaw; Alternate: Steve Howard
Newfoundland and Labrador	Northern Ontario	Nova Scotia	Ontario
St. John's CC, St. John's Skip: Brad Gushue; Third: Mark Nichols; Second: Jamie Korab; Lead: Mark Ward; Alternate: Mike Adam	Cobalt-Haileybury CC, Haileybury Skip: Rob Gordon; Third: Brian Fawcett; Second: Steve Burnett (Note: Team Northern Ontario alternate Larry Carr threw second stones in Draw 13.); Lead: Jeremy Landry; Alternate: Larry Carr	Mayflower CC, Halifax Skip: Mark Dacey; Third: Bruce Lohnes; Second: Rob Harris; Lead: Andrew Gibson; Alternate: Mat Harris	Oakville CC, Oakville Skip: Mike Harris; Third: John Base; Second: Phil Loevenmark; Lead: Trevor Wall; Alternate: Ross Scarrow
Prince Edward Island	Quebec	Saskatchewan	Yukon/Northwest Territories
Silver Fox C&YC, Summerside Skip: Mike Gaudet; Third: Evan Sullivan; Second: Craig Arsenault; Lead: Sean Ledgerwood; Alternate: Rod MacDonald	CC Rosemère, Rosemère Skip: Daniel Lafleur; Third: Steeve Gagnon; Second: Jean-Sébastien Roy; Lead: Maurice Cayouette (Note: Team Quebec alternate Serge Friolet threw lead stones in Draw 14.); Alternate: Serge Friolet	Muenster CC, Muenster Skip: Bruce Korte; Third: Clint Dieno; Second: Roger Korte; Lead: Roy Galonowski; Alternate: Darrell McKee	Whitehorse CC, Whitehorse Skip: Brian Wasnea; Third: Pat Molloy; Second: Bruce Hunt; Lead: Kevin Sumner (Note: Team Yukon/Northwest Territories alternate Clarence Jack threw lead stones in Draw 15.); Alternate: Clarence Jack

== Map of teams ==
Provincial Winners

== Round Robin standings ==
Final Round Robin standings

Key
Teams to Playoffs
Teams to Tiebreaker

Locale	Skip	W	L	W–L	PF	PA	EW	EL	BE	SE	S%
Nova Scotia	Mark Dacey	10	1	1–0	81	53	45	39	11	12	83%
Alberta	Randy Ferbey	10	1	0–1	89	53	46	42	6	11	88%
Newfoundland and Labrador	Brad Gushue	8	3	–	85	62	51	34	1	18	85%
British Columbia	Jay Peachey	7	4	1–0	67	64	43	44	11	13	81%
New Brunswick	Russ Howard	7	4	0–1	74	66	51	45	3	10	86%
Ontario	Mike Harris	6	5	–	84	58	48	45	2	10	83%
Saskatchewan	Bruce Korte	5	6	1–0	80	69	46	47	10	13	82%
Northern Ontario	Rob Gordon	5	6	0–1	61	87	40	46	4	9	74%
Manitoba	Brent Scales	3	8	1–0	58	81	36	48	3	6	79%
Quebec	Daniel Lafleur	3	8	0–1	64	81	42	43	6	8	79%
Prince Edward Island	Mike Gaudet	2	9	–	66	83	46	48	1	12	79%
Yukon/Northwest Territories	Brian Wasnea	0	11	–	51	103	37	50	2	5	71%

== Round-robin results ==
All draw times are listed in Central Standard Time (UTC−6).

=== Draw 1 ===
Saturday, March 6, 1:00 pm

Sheet A	1	2	3	4	5	6	7	8	9	10	Final
Northern Ontario (Gordon)	0	0	0	0	2	0	0	0	X	X	2
British Columbia (Peachey) 🔨	1	2	1	1	0	0	1	1	X	X	7

Sheet B	1	2	3	4	5	6	7	8	9	10	Final
Quebec (Lafleur) 🔨	0	0	0	3	0	2	0	2	2	X	9
Prince Edward Island (Gaudet)	0	1	0	0	2	0	1	0	0	X	4

Sheet C	1	2	3	4	5	6	7	8	9	10	11	Final
Ontario (Harris) 🔨	2	2	0	0	0	2	0	0	0	2	0	8
New Brunswick (Howard)	0	0	0	2	1	0	3	1	1	0	1	9

Sheet D	1	2	3	4	5	6	7	8	9	10	Final
Alberta (Ferbey) 🔨	2	0	3	1	0	0	0	1	0	1	8
Saskatchewan (Korte)	0	2	0	0	0	2	1	0	2	0	7

=== Draw 2 ===
Saturday, March 6, 6:00 pm

Sheet A	1	2	3	4	5	6	7	8	9	10	Final
New Brunswick (Howard) 🔨	2	0	2	0	2	0	1	0	0	1	8
Quebec (Lafleur)	0	2	0	1	0	2	0	1	1	0	7

Sheet B	1	2	3	4	5	6	7	8	9	10	Final
Newfoundland and Labrador (Gushue) 🔨	2	1	1	1	1	0	1	0	X	X	7
Manitoba (Scales)	0	0	0	0	0	1	0	1	X	X	2

Sheet C	1	2	3	4	5	6	7	8	9	10	Final
Yukon/Northwest Territories (Wasnea)	0	0	2	0	0	1	0	2	0	X	5
Nova Scotia (Dacey) 🔨	0	1	0	3	1	0	2	0	2	X	9

Sheet D	1	2	3	4	5	6	7	8	9	10	Final
Ontario (Harris) 🔨	0	1	0	1	1	1	0	1	0	1	6
Prince Edward Island (Gaudet)	1	0	1	0	0	0	1	0	1	0	4

=== Draw 3 ===
Sunday, March 7, 9:00 am

Sheet B	1	2	3	4	5	6	7	8	9	10	Final
Saskatchewan (Korte) 🔨	3	1	0	2	0	2	0	2	X	X	10
Northern Ontario (Gordon)	0	0	1	0	1	0	1	0	X	X	3

Sheet C	1	2	3	4	5	6	7	8	9	10	Final
Alberta (Ferbey) 🔨	0	2	0	0	0	2	0	3	0	1	8
British Columbia (Peachey)	1	0	1	1	1	0	1	0	2	0	7

=== Draw 4 ===
Sunday, March 7, 1:30 pm

Sheet A	1	2	3	4	5	6	7	8	9	10	Final
Manitoba (Scales) 🔨	2	0	3	3	0	2	X	X	X	X	10
Yukon/Northwest Territories (Wasnea)	0	2	0	0	1	0	X	X	X	X	3

Sheet B	1	2	3	4	5	6	7	8	9	10	Final
Prince Edward Island (Gaudet) 🔨	2	0	1	0	1	0	1	0	1	X	6
New Brunswick (Howard)	0	2	0	2	0	1	0	2	0	X	7

Sheet C	1	2	3	4	5	6	7	8	9	10	Final
Quebec (Lafleur) 🔨	0	0	1	0	1	0	X	X	X	X	2
Ontario (Harris)	2	1	0	2	0	3	X	X	X	X	8

Sheet D	1	2	3	4	5	6	7	8	9	10	Final
Newfoundland and Labrador (Gushue) 🔨	1	0	2	1	2	1	0	0	1	X	8
Nova Scotia (Dacey)	0	3	0	0	0	0	0	1	0	X	4

=== Draw 5 ===
Sunday, March 7, 6:30 pm

Sheet A	1	2	3	4	5	6	7	8	9	10	Final
British Columbia (Peachey) 🔨	0	0	0	1	0	0	0	1	X	X	2
Saskatchewan (Korte)	0	1	1	0	2	1	2	0	X	X	7

Sheet B	1	2	3	4	5	6	7	8	9	10	Final
Yukon/Northwest Territories (Wasnea) 🔨	1	0	0	0	0	1	0	X	X	X	2
Newfoundland and Labrador (Gushue)	0	3	3	2	0	0	1	X	X	X	9

Sheet C	1	2	3	4	5	6	7	8	9	10	Final
Nova Scotia (Dacey) 🔨	1	0	2	0	0	3	3	1	X	X	10
Manitoba (Scales)	0	2	0	1	1	0	0	0	X	X	4

Sheet D	1	2	3	4	5	6	7	8	9	10	Final
Northern Ontario (Gordon) 🔨	0	0	0	1	1	1	X	X	X	X	3
Alberta (Ferbey)	4	1	4	0	0	0	X	X	X	X	9

=== Draw 6 ===
Monday, March 8, 9:00 am

Sheet A	1	2	3	4	5	6	7	8	9	10	Final
Alberta (Ferbey) 🔨	2	0	1	0	2	0	0	1	0	1	7
Ontario (Harris)	0	1	0	2	0	1	0	0	1	0	5

Sheet B	1	2	3	4	5	6	7	8	9	10	11	Final
Saskatchewan (Korte) 🔨	0	0	2	0	1	0	0	0	2	1	0	6
Quebec (Lafleur)	1	0	0	2	0	2	0	1	0	0	1	7

Sheet C	1	2	3	4	5	6	7	8	9	10	11	Final
Northern Ontario (Gordon) 🔨	0	1	0	0	1	0	0	0	2	0	1	5
New Brunswick (Howard)	0	0	1	0	0	2	0	0	0	1	0	4

Sheet D	1	2	3	4	5	6	7	8	9	10	Final
British Columbia (Peachey) 🔨	0	0	0	0	3	0	1	2	0	X	6
Prince Edward Island (Gaudet)	0	0	0	0	0	1	0	0	1	X	2

=== Draw 7 ===
Monday, March 8, 1:30 pm

Sheet A	1	2	3	4	5	6	7	8	9	10	Final
Quebec (Lafleur) 🔨	0	0	1	0	0	1	1	0	0	X	3
Nova Scotia (Dacey)	0	0	0	0	2	0	0	3	4	X	9

Sheet B	1	2	3	4	5	6	7	8	9	10	Final
Ontario (Harris) 🔨	2	0	0	3	0	0	2	0	2	X	9
Manitoba (Scales)	0	1	1	0	1	1	0	1	0	X	5

Sheet C	1	2	3	4	5	6	7	8	9	10	Final
Prince Edward Island (Gaudet) 🔨	3	0	1	1	0	2	0	1	0	X	8
Yukon/Northwest Territories (Wasnea)	0	1	0	0	1	0	1	0	1	X	4

Sheet D	1	2	3	4	5	6	7	8	9	10	Final
New Brunswick (Howard) 🔨	2	0	2	0	2	0	1	0	1	X	8
Newfoundland and Labrador (Gushue)	0	1	0	1	0	1	0	2	0	X	5

=== Draw 8 ===
Monday, March 8, 6:30 pm

Sheet A	1	2	3	4	5	6	7	8	9	10	Final
Newfoundland and Labrador (Gushue) 🔨	4	0	1	0	4	0	2	X	X	X	11
Northern Ontario (Gordon)	0	1	0	1	0	1	0	X	X	X	3

Sheet B	1	2	3	4	5	6	7	8	9	10	Final
Yukon/Northwest Territories (Wasnea) 🔨	0	0	1	1	1	1	2	0	0	X	6
British Columbia (Peachey)	0	1	0	0	0	0	0	4	3	X	8

Sheet C	1	2	3	4	5	6	7	8	9	10	Final
Manitoba (Scales) 🔨	1	0	0	1	0	0	1	0	1	X	4
Alberta (Ferbey)	0	2	1	0	0	1	0	2	0	X	6

Sheet D	1	2	3	4	5	6	7	8	9	10	Final
Nova Scotia (Dacey) 🔨	1	1	0	0	0	0	1	3	0	1	7
Saskatchewan (Korte)	0	0	1	2	0	2	0	0	1	0	6

=== Draw 9 ===
Tuesday, March 9, 9:00 am

Sheet A	1	2	3	4	5	6	7	8	9	10	Final
Manitoba (Scales) 🔨	1	0	2	0	1	0	0	0	2	0	6
British Columbia (Peachey)	0	1	0	1	0	2	1	2	0	1	8

Sheet B	1	2	3	4	5	6	7	8	9	10	Final
Nova Scotia (Dacey) 🔨	2	0	0	1	0	2	0	4	X	X	9
Northern Ontario (Gordon)	0	1	0	0	1	0	1	0	X	X	3

Sheet C	1	2	3	4	5	6	7	8	9	10	11	Final
Newfoundland and Labrador (Gushue) 🔨	2	0	0	0	1	0	0	1	0	0	1	5
Saskatchewan (Korte)	0	0	0	0	0	2	0	0	0	2	0	4

Sheet D	1	2	3	4	5	6	7	8	9	10	Final
Yukon/Northwest Territories (Wasnea) 🔨	2	0	1	0	2	0	1	0	X	X	6
Alberta (Ferbey)	0	2	0	3	0	4	0	3	X	X	12

=== Draw 10 ===
Tuesday, March 9, 1:30 pm

Sheet A	1	2	3	4	5	6	7	8	9	10	Final
Saskatchewan (Korte) 🔨	0	3	0	1	0	3	0	2	0	X	9
Prince Edward Island (Gaudet)	1	0	1	0	1	0	1	0	1	X	5

Sheet B	1	2	3	4	5	6	7	8	9	10	Final
Alberta (Ferbey) 🔨	1	0	3	1	0	1	0	0	1	X	7
New Brunswick (Howard)	0	1	0	0	1	0	1	0	0	X	3

Sheet C	1	2	3	4	5	6	7	8	9	10	11	Final
British Columbia (Peachey) 🔨	0	2	0	2	0	2	0	1	0	0	2	9
Quebec (Lafleur)	0	0	1	0	1	0	2	0	2	1	0	7

Sheet D	1	2	3	4	5	6	7	8	9	10	Final
Northern Ontario (Gordon) 🔨	1	0	1	0	0	0	1	0	X	X	3
Ontario (Harris)	0	4	0	1	1	2	0	3	X	X	11

=== Draw 11 ===
Tuesday, March 9, 6:30 pm

Sheet A	1	2	3	4	5	6	7	8	9	10	Final
New Brunswick (Howard) 🔨	2	0	2	1	1	0	1	0	2	X	9
Yukon/Northwest Territories (Wasnea)	0	3	0	0	0	1	0	1	0	X	5

Sheet B	1	2	3	4	5	6	7	8	9	10	Final
Prince Edward Island (Gaudet) 🔨	4	0	0	2	1	0	3	0	0	X	10
Newfoundland and Labrador (Gushue)	0	4	1	0	0	2	0	3	4	X	14

Sheet C	1	2	3	4	5	6	7	8	9	10	Final
Ontario (Harris) 🔨	0	1	0	0	1	0	0	1	0	0	3
Nova Scotia (Dacey)	0	0	1	0	0	0	2	0	0	1	4

Sheet D	1	2	3	4	5	6	7	8	9	10	Final
Quebec (Lafleur) 🔨	0	1	0	0	1	0	1	1	0	0	4
Manitoba (Scales)	0	0	0	3	0	2	0	0	0	0	5

=== Draw 12 ===
Wednesday, March 10, 9:00 am

Sheet A	1	2	3	4	5	6	7	8	9	10	Final
Ontario (Harris) 🔨	1	0	2	0	2	0	2	0	3	X	10
Newfoundland and Labrador (Gushue)	0	2	0	1	0	1	0	1	0	X	5

Sheet B	1	2	3	4	5	6	7	8	9	10	Final
Quebec (Lafleur) 🔨	0	3	0	3	0	1	0	2	X	X	9
Yukon/Northwest Territories (Wasnea)	0	0	2	0	1	0	1	0	X	X	4

Sheet C	1	2	3	4	5	6	7	8	9	10	Final
New Brunswick (Howard) 🔨	1	0	2	0	1	1	0	0	3	X	8
Manitoba (Scales)	0	1	0	1	0	0	2	0	0	X	4

Sheet D	1	2	3	4	5	6	7	8	9	10	Final
Prince Edward Island (Gaudet) 🔨	0	1	0	0	1	0	0	2	0	X	4
Nova Scotia (Dacey)	1	0	3	1	0	1	2	0	1	X	9

=== Draw 13 ===
Wednesday, March 10, 1:30 pm

Sheet A	1	2	3	4	5	6	7	8	9	10	Final
Nova Scotia (Dacey) 🔨	1	0	0	0	2	0	0	3	0	2	8
Alberta (Ferbey)	0	0	1	1	0	3	1	0	1	0	7

Sheet B	1	2	3	4	5	6	7	8	9	10	Final
Manitoba (Scales) 🔨	2	0	5	1	2	0	0	1	X	X	11
Saskatchewan (Korte)	0	2	0	0	0	2	1	0	X	X	5

Sheet C	1	2	3	4	5	6	7	8	9	10	Final
Yukon/Northwest Territories (Wasnea) 🔨	1	0	2	0	1	0	2	1	0	0	7
Northern Ontario (Gordon)	0	2	0	1	0	2	0	0	1	2	8

Sheet D	1	2	3	4	5	6	7	8	9	10	Final
Newfoundland and Labrador (Gushue) 🔨	2	0	2	1	0	0	2	1	X	X	8
British Columbia (Peachey)	0	0	0	0	0	1	0	0	X	X	1

=== Draw 14 ===
Wednesday, March 10, 6:30 pm

Sheet A	1	2	3	4	5	6	7	8	9	10	Final
Northern Ontario (Gordon) 🔨	2	1	0	1	0	3	0	0	2	X	9
Quebec (Lafleur)	0	0	1	0	1	0	2	2	0	X	6

Sheet B	1	2	3	4	5	6	7	8	9	10	Final
British Columbia (Peachey) 🔨	1	1	0	0	0	3	0	1	0	X	6
Ontario (Harris)	0	0	1	1	0	0	1	0	2	X	5

Sheet C	1	2	3	4	5	6	7	8	9	10	Final
Alberta (Ferbey) 🔨	0	2	1	0	2	0	1	0	0	0	6
Prince Edward Island (Gaudet)	1	0	0	1	0	1	0	0	1	1	5

Sheet D	1	2	3	4	5	6	7	8	9	10	Final
Saskatchewan (Korte) 🔨	1	0	0	0	1	0	0	0	3	0	5
New Brunswick (Howard)	0	1	1	0	0	2	1	0	0	1	6

=== Draw 15 ===
Thursday, March 11, 9:00 am

Sheet A	1	2	3	4	5	6	7	8	9	10	Final
Prince Edward Island (Gaudet) 🔨	3	0	2	1	1	0	2	X	X	X	9
Manitoba (Scales)	0	1	0	0	0	2	0	X	X	X	3

Sheet B	1	2	3	4	5	6	7	8	9	10	Final
New Brunswick (Howard) 🔨	1	0	0	1	0	0	0	2	1	0	5
Nova Scotia (Dacey)	0	0	1	0	1	3	0	0	0	1	6

Sheet C	1	2	3	4	5	6	7	8	9	10	Final
Quebec (Lafleur) 🔨	1	0	0	2	0	3	0	0	2	0	8
Newfoundland and Labrador (Gushue)	0	2	1	0	2	0	2	1	0	2	10

Sheet D	1	2	3	4	5	6	7	8	9	10	Final
Ontario (Harris) 🔨	3	0	2	1	1	0	3	X	X	X	10
Yukon/Northwest Territories (Wasnea)	0	2	0	0	0	1	0	X	X	X	3

=== Draw 16 ===
Thursday, March 11, 1:30 pm

Sheet A	1	2	3	4	5	6	7	8	9	10	11	Final
British Columbia (Peachey) 🔨	1	0	1	0	0	0	3	0	2	0	1	8
New Brunswick (Howard)	0	1	0	1	1	0	0	2	0	2	0	7

Sheet B	1	2	3	4	5	6	7	8	9	10	11	Final
Northern Ontario (Gordon) 🔨	0	1	0	2	2	1	3	0	0	0	1	10
Prince Edward Island (Gaudet)	1	0	4	0	0	0	0	2	1	1	0	9

Sheet C	1	2	3	4	5	6	7	8	9	10	11	Final
Saskatchewan (Korte) 🔨	1	0	1	1	0	2	0	1	0	3	1	10
Ontario (Harris)	0	3	0	0	2	0	2	0	2	0	0	9

Sheet D	1	2	3	4	5	6	7	8	9	10	Final
Alberta (Ferbey) 🔨	6	0	1	0	0	2	X	X	X	X	9
Quebec (Lafleur)	0	1	0	1	0	0	X	X	X	X	2

=== Draw 17 ===
Thursday, March 11, 6:30 pm

Sheet A	1	2	3	4	5	6	7	8	9	10	Final
Yukon/Northwest Territories (Wasnea) 🔨	1	0	2	0	2	0	0	1	0	0	6
Saskatchewan (Korte)	0	2	0	2	0	2	1	0	0	4	11

Sheet B	1	2	3	4	5	6	7	8	9	10	Final
Newfoundland and Labrador (Gushue) 🔨	0	1	1	0	0	0	1	0	X	X	3
Alberta (Ferbey)	1	0	0	0	2	2	0	5	X	X	10

Sheet C	1	2	3	4	5	6	7	8	9	10	Final
Nova Scotia (Dacey) 🔨	0	0	2	1	1	0	2	0	0	X	6
British Columbia (Peachey)	0	0	0	0	0	3	0	2	0	X	5

Sheet D	1	2	3	4	5	6	7	8	9	10	Final
Manitoba (Scales) 🔨	0	3	0	0	1	0	X	X	X	X	4
Northern Ontario (Gordon)	4	0	4	2	0	2	X	X	X	X	12

== Tiebreaker ==
Friday, March 12, 9:00 am

Sheet B	1	2	3	4	5	6	7	8	9	10	Final
British Columbia (Peachey) 🔨	2	0	0	2	0	1	0	0	0	2	7
New Brunswick (Howard)	0	1	1	0	2	0	0	1	0	0	5

Player percentages
British Columbia		New Brunswick	
Brad Fenton	89%	Grant Odishaw	93%
Kevin Ricksiedler	94%	Marc LeCocq	81%
Ron Leech	83%	James Grattan	83%
Jay Peachey	80%	Russ Howard	83%
Total	86%	Total	85%

== Playoffs ==
Page playoff system
1	Nova Scotia	6
2	Alberta	10
3	Newfoundland and Labrador	5
4	British Columbia	7

Semifinal
1	Nova Scotia	7
4	British Columbia	4

Final
2	Alberta	9
1	Nova Scotia	10

=== 1 vs. 2 ===
Friday, March 12, 1:30 pm

Sheet B	1	2	3	4	5	6	7	8	9	10	Final
Nova Scotia (Dacey) 🔨	1	0	0	1	0	2	0	2	0	X	6
Alberta (Ferbey)	0	2	0	0	1	0	4	0	3	X	10

Player percentages
Nova Scotia		Alberta	
Andrew Gibson	92%	Marcel Rocque	97%
Rob Harris	89%	Scott Pfeifer	89%
Bruce Lohnes	81%	Randy Ferbey	90%
Mark Dacey	65%	David Nedohin	88%
Total	82%	Total	91%

=== 3 vs. 4 ===
Friday, March 12, 6:30 pm

Sheet B	1	2	3	4	5	6	7	8	9	10	Final
Newfoundland and Labrador (Gushue) 🔨	1	0	0	1	0	1	0	2	0	0	5
British Columbia (Peachey)	0	1	0	0	2	0	1	0	2	1	7

Player percentages
Newfoundland and Labrador		British Columbia	
Mark Ward	88%	Brad Fenton	85%
Jamie Korab	78%	Kevin Ricksiedler	74%
Mark Nichols	90%	Ron Leech	79%
Brad Gushue	84%	Jay Peachey	83%
Total	85%	Total	80%

=== Semifinal ===
Saturday, March 13, 1:00 pm

Sheet B	1	2	3	4	5	6	7	8	9	10	Final
Nova Scotia (Dacey) 🔨	0	2	0	1	0	1	0	3	0	X	7
British Columbia (Peachey)	0	0	1	0	1	0	1	0	1	X	4

Player percentages
Nova Scotia		British Columbia	
Andrew Gibson	85%	Brad Fenton	90%
Rob Harris	93%	Kevin Ricksiedler	80%
Bruce Lohnes	95%	Ron Leech	89%
Mark Dacey	94%	Jay Peachey	75%
Total	92%	Total	84%

=== Final ===
The final was played and televised on the CBC across Canada. Ferbey led 8–4 after the 7th end but Dacey's team put themselves back into the game with a big 3 point 8th end. Forcing Alberta to take a single in the 9th, Dacey was 2 down coming home but had last rock advantage. A couple of errors by Ferbey's team and some good shot making, gave Nova Scotia 3 points in the 10th end and the championship.

Sunday, March 14, 6:00 pm

Sheet B	1	2	3	4	5	6	7	8	9	10	Final
Nova Scotia (Dacey) 🔨	1	0	2	0	1	0	0	3	0	3	10
Alberta (Ferbey)	0	2	0	2	0	3	1	0	1	0	9

Player percentages
Alberta		Nova Scotia	
Marcel Rocque	95%	Andrew Gibson	90%
Scott Pfeifer	88%	Rob Harris	94%
Randy Ferbey	90%	Bruce Lohnes	88%
David Nedohin	84%	Mark Dacey	74%
Total	89%	Total	86%

== Statistics ==
=== Top 5 player percentages ===
Round Robin only

Key
First All-Star Team
Second All-Star Team

Leads	%
(Alberta) Marcel Rocque	93
(New Brunswick) Grant Odishaw	91
(Ontario) Trevor Wall	89
(British Columbia) Brad Fenton	88
(Manitoba) Todd Trevellyan	87

Seconds	%
(Alberta) Scott Pfeifer	89
(Newfoundland and Labrador) Jamie Korab	87
(New Brunswick) Marc LeCocq	85
(Ontario) Phil Loevenmark	84
(Nova Scotia) Rob Harris	83
(Manitoba) Grant Spicer	83

Thirds	%
(Alberta) Randy Ferbey	87
(New Brunswick) James Grattan	85
(Ontario) John Base	84
(Newfoundland and Labrador) Mark Nichols	84
(Saskatchewan) Clint Dieno	83

Skips	%
(New Brunswick) Russ Howard	84
(Newfoundland and Labrador) Brad Gushue	83
(Alberta) David Nedohin	82
(Nova Scotia) Mark Dacey	81
(Saskatchewan) Bruce Korte	79

=== Perfect Games ===
Round robin only; minimum 10 shots thrown

Player	Team	Position	Shots	Opponent
Trevor Wall	Ontario	Lead	20	Prince Edward Island
Phil Loevenmark	Ontario	Second	12	Quebec
Scott Pfeifer	Alberta	Second	12	Northern Ontario
Brad Fenton	British Columbia	Lead	20	Nova Scotia

== Awards ==
=== All-Star teams ===
The All-Star Teams were as follows:

First Team
Position	Name	Team
Skip	Brad Gushue	Newfoundland and Labrador
Third	Randy Ferbey (Skip) (4)	Alberta
Second	Scott Pfeifer (3)	Alberta
Lead	Marcel Rocque (2)	Alberta

Second Team
Position	Name	Team
Skip	Mark Dacey	Nova Scotia
Third	Mark Nichols	Newfoundland and Labrador
Second	Jamie Korab	Newfoundland and Labrador
Lead	Grant Odishaw	New Brunswick

=== Ross Harstone Sportsmanship Award ===
The Ross Harstone Sportsmanship Award is presented to the player chosen by their fellow peers as the curler who best represented Harstone's high ideals of good sportsmanship, observance of the rules, exemplary conduct and curling ability.

Name	Position	Team
Daniel Lafleur	Skip	Quebec

=== Hec Gervais Most Valuable Player Award ===
The Hec Gervais Most Valuable Player Award was awarded to the top player in the playoff round by members of the media.

Name	Position	Team
Mark Dacey	Skip	Nova Scotia

== Qualifying ==
=== Alberta ===
@ Hinton

1. Randy Ferbey
2. Kurt Balderston
3. Kevin Martin
4. John Morris
5. Rob Armitage

=== British Columbia ===
@ Nanaimo

1. Jay Peachey
2. Scott Decap
3. Brian Miki
4. Wes Craig

=== Manitoba ===
@ Brandon

1. Brent Scales
2. Jeff Stoughton
3. Murray Woodward
4. Dave Boehmer

=== New Brunswick ===
@ Fredericton

1. Russ Howard
2. Terry Odishaw
3. Mike Flannery
4. Mike Kennedy

=== Northern Ontario ===
@ Sault Ste. Marie

1. Rob Gordon
2. Jeff Currie
3. Denis Malette
4. Al Harnden

=== Ontario ===
@ Owen Sound

1. Mike Harris
2. Glenn Howard
3. Phil Daniel
4. Peter Corner

=== Nova Scotia ===
@ Kentville

1. Mark Dacey

=== Newfoundland and Labrador ===
@ Goose Bay

1. Brad Gushue
2. Mark Noseworthy
3. Keith Ryan
4. John Boland

=== Prince Edward Island ===
@ Summerside

1. Mike Gaudet
2. John Likely
3. Peter MacDonald
4. Andrew Robinson

=== Saskatchewan ===
@ Moose Jaw

1. Bruce Korte
2. Brad Heidt
3. Doug Harcourt
4. Joel Jordison

=== Yukon/Northwest Territories ===
@ Whitehorse

1. Brian Wasnea
2. Peter O'Driscoll
3. Chad Cowan
4. Paul Delorey
