= Denni Neufeld =

Canadian curler

- Curler
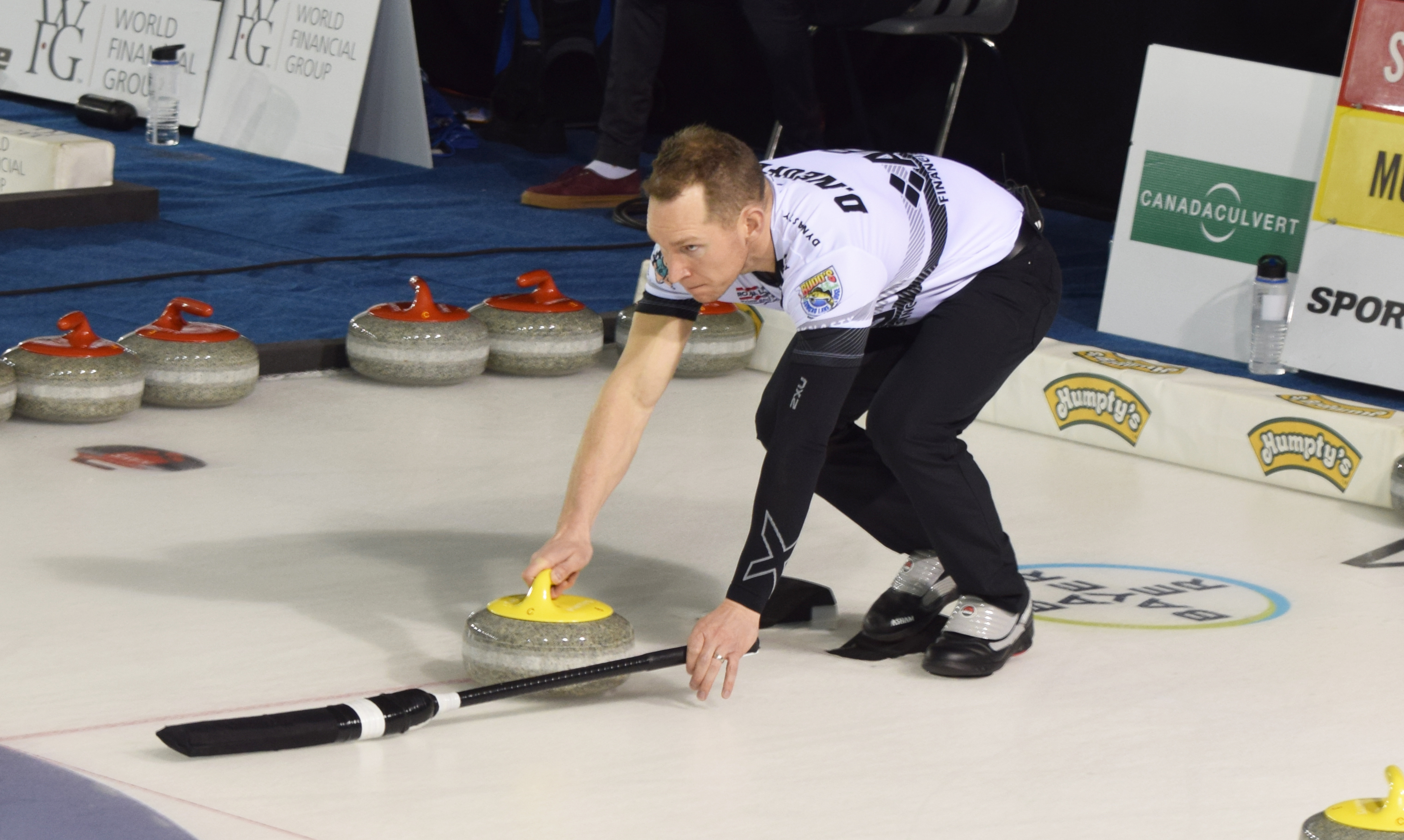
- Denni Neufeld delivers his rock at the 2018 Elite 10 Grand Slam event in Winnipeg, Manitoba.
- Born: January 25, 1981 (age 45); Steinbach, Manitoba, Canada

Team
- Curling club: Fort Rouge CC, Winnipeg, MB

Curling career
- Brier: 3 (2016, 2017, 2018)
- Top CTRS ranking: 1st (2014-15)
- Grand Slam victories: 7 (World Cup (2010, 2015); The National (Nov. 2014); Canadian Open (Jan. 2011, Dec. 2011); Elite 10 (2015, Mar. 2018)
Medal record
Men's Curling
Representing Canada
Winter Universiade
Gold medal – first place	2003 Tarvisio
Representing Manitoba
Canadian Olympic Curling Trials
Silver medal – second place	2017 Ottawa
Tim Hortons Brier
Bronze medal – third place	2017 St. John's
Representing Alberta
Canadian Olympic Curling Trials
Bronze medal – third place	2021 Saskatoon

Dennison "Denni" Neufeld (born January 25, 1981) is a Canadian curler from Winnipeg, Manitoba.

Born in Steinbach, Manitoba, Neufeld won a gold medal for Manitoba at the 1999 Canada Games. In 2001 he joined Mike McEwen's team. After a few years of curling on-and-off together, the team of McEwen, Neufeld, brother B. J. Neufeld, and Matt Wozniak was formed in 2007. Neufeld played lead stones for the team, which lasted for 11 years until the end of the 2017-18 curling season, when they disbanded. The following season, Neufeld played second for Team Jason Gunnlaugson. He announced that he would be stepping back from curling at the end of the season.

== Personal ==
Neufeld started curling around the age of ten and cites the achievements of his father as leading his interest into the game of curling. His father is Chris Neufeld who was a three time Manitoba curling champion and one time Labatt Brier champion in 1992 as part of the Vic Peters team. Neufeld is employed as a realtor for Royal LePage Prime Real Estate. He is married to Cheryl Neufeld and has two children.

Neufeld's younger brother, B.J. Neufeld, is also a curler.

== Grand Slam record ==
Key
C	Champion
F	Lost in Final
SF	Lost in Semifinal
QF	Lost in Quarterfinals
R16	Lost in the round of 16
Q	Did not advance to playoffs
T2	Played in Tier 2 event
DNP	Did not participate in event
N/A	Not a Grand Slam event that season

Event	2002–03	2003–04	2004–05	2005–06	2006–07	2007–08	2008–09	2009–10	2010–11	2011–12	2012–13	2013–14	2014–15	2015–16	2016–17	2017–18	2018–19
Tour Challenge	N/A	N/A	N/A	N/A	N/A	N/A	N/A	N/A	N/A	N/A	N/A	N/A	N/A	SF	QF	DNP	Q
Masters	DNP	Q	Q	Q	DNP	DNP	Q	DNP	C	QF	QF	Q	F	C	QF	SF	Q
The National	DNP	QF	Q	DNP	DNP	DNP	QF	QF	QF	Q	F	QF	C	Q	Q	SF	QF
Canadian Open	DNP	Q	QF	DNP	DNP	DNP	SF	QF	C	C	SF	Q	QF	Q	QF	QF	Q
Elite 10	N/A	N/A	N/A	N/A	N/A	N/A	N/A	N/A	N/A	N/A	N/A	N/A	C	QF	DNP	C	Q
Players'	Q	DNP	DNP	DNP	DNP	Q	SF	Q	QF	SF	F	SF	F	SF	F	SF	DNP
Champions Cup	N/A	N/A	N/A	N/A	N/A	N/A	N/A	N/A	N/A	N/A	N/A	N/A	N/A	SF	QF	QF	DNP
