= Mayflower Curling Club =

Curling club in Halifax, Nova Scotia

Coordinates: 44°39′25.7″N 63°36′12.4″W

- Location: Timberlea, Nova Scotia, Canada
- Arena: 82 Marketway Lane Timberlea, NS

Information
- Established: 1905
- Club type: Dedicated Ice
- Curling Canada region: Nova Scotia Curling Association
- Sheets of ice: eight
- Rock colours: Red and Yellow
- Website: https://mayflowercc.com/

The Mayflower Curling Club is a curling club in Timberlea, Nova Scotia. It was established in Halifax, Nova Scotia in 1905.

The club is one of the premier curling rinks in Nova Scotia, being home to teams headed by Colleen Jones, Mark Dacey, Shawn Adams, and Heather Smith-Dacey. The club was host for the curling events during the 2011 Canada Winter Games.

== History ==
In 1912 the club's then-premises on Agricola Street was used as a temporary morgue for the bodies of Titanic disaster victims recovered from the North Atlantic by the Halifax-based ship the CS Mackay-Bennett, as it was the only site in the city that was both sufficiently large and cold enough for the task. Following the 1917 Halifax Explosion, the devastated Agricola Street rinks were rebuilt.

In 2006, the Mayflower began hosting the Loose Ends Curling League, an LGBT league that is a member of the Canadian Pride Curling Association. In 2010, the league was hosting its Bluenose Bonspiel when Hurricane Earl hit the city—then-MP Justin Trudeau, whose regular events were cancelled, joined the bonspiel. Loose Ends and the Mayflower have twice hosted the Canadian Pride Curling Championships, most recently in 2023.

In 2022, members of the club voted to sell the property and build a new ice facility in Timberlea, Nova Scotia. The club moved to the new facility in 2025.

== National champions ==
- 2010 Canadian Mixed Curling Championship: Mark Dacey, Heather Smith-Dacey, Andrew Gibson, Jill Mouzar
- 2004 Nokia Brier: Mark Dacey, Bruce Lohnes, Rob Harris, Andrew Gibson
- 2004 Scott Tournament of Hearts: Colleen Jones, Kim Kelly, Mary-Anne Arsenault, Nancy Delahunt
- 2003 Scott Tournament of Hearts: Colleen Jones, Kim Kelly, Mary-Anne Waye, Nancy Delahunt
- 2003 Canadian Mixed Curling Championship: Paul Flemming, Kim Kelly, Tom Fetterly, Cathy Donald
- 2002 Scott Tournament of Hearts: Colleen Jones, Kim Kelly, Mary-Anne Waye, Nancy Delahunt
- 2002 Canadian Mixed Curling Championship: Mark Dacey, Heather Smith-Dacey, Rob Harris, Laine Peters
- 2001 Scott Tournament of Hearts: Colleen Jones, Kim Kelly, Mary-Anne Waye, Nancy Delahunt
- 1999 Scott Tournament of Hearts: Colleen Jones, Kim Kelly, Mary-Anne Waye, Nancy Delahunt
- 1999 Canadian Mixed Curling Championship: Paul Flemming, Colleen Jones, Tom Fetterly, Monica Moriarty
- 1998 Canadian Mixed Curling Championship: Steve Ogden, Mary Mattatall, Geoff Hopkins, Heather Hopkins
- 1995 Canadian Mixed Curling Championship: Steve Ogden, Mary Mattatall, Geoff Hopkins, Heather Hopkins
