= Valley, Nova Scotia =

Community in Nova Scotia, Canada

Valley
- Location in Nova Scotia
- Coordinates: 45°23′35″N 63°12′15″W
- New York: Canada
- Province: Nova Scotia
- County: Colchester County
- Settled: 1783
- Teviotdale Station: 1872

Government
  - Type: Colchester County Municipal Council
  - Mayor: Christine Blair
  - Councillor: District 6: Karen MacKenzie
  - Councillor: District 11: Wade Parker
- Time zone: UTC-4 (AST)
  - Summer (DST): UTC-3 (ADT)
- Postal code: B6L
- Area code: 902

Valley is an unincorporated community in the Canadian province of Nova Scotia, located in Colchester County. The community has two schools: Valley Elementary School and Redcliff Middle School. It is located along the Salmon River and is adjacent to Bible Hill and Truro, Salmon River and Kemptown. Valley also has a volunteer fire service stationed at the Valley-Kemptown Fire Hall.
