= Mark Dacey =

Canadian curler

- Curler
- Born: June 22, 1966 (age 60); Saskatoon, Saskatchewan, Canada

Team
- Curling club: Mayflower CC, Halifax, NS

Curling career
- Member Association: Saskatchewan (1981–1995; 1996–1997); New Brunswick (1995–1996); Nova Scotia (1997–present)
- Brier: 6 (1995, 2001, 2003, 2004, 2006, 2009)
- World Championship: 1 (2004)
- Top CTRS ranking: 7th (2003–04)
Medal record
Men's curling
Representing Canada
World Championships
Bronze medal – third place	2004 Gävle
Representing Nova Scotia
Tim Hortons Brier
Gold medal – first place	2004 Saskatoon
Silver medal – second place	2003 Halifax
Bronze medal – third place	2006 Regina
Canadian Mixed Doubles Championships
Bronze medal – third place	2013 Leduc
Representing Saskatchewan
Labatt Brier
Silver medal – second place	1995 Halifax

Mark Dacey (born June 22, 1966) is a Canadian curler originally from Saskatchewan. He was based at the Mayflower Curling Club in Halifax, Nova Scotia.

Dacey is a former Canadian men's curling champion skip, having won the 2004 Nokia Brier. He defeated Randy Ferbey's team, ending their 3-year Brier winning streak. Dacey went on to win a bronze medal at the 2004 Ford World Curling Championship.

== Competitive history ==
Mark Dacey was a runner-up in the 1995 Brier as the vice-skip for team Saskatchewan (skipped by Brad Heidt). After meeting at the 1995 Canadian Mixed Curling Championship, Dacey started dating 1991 Canadian Junior champion Heather Smith, and moved to New Brunswick to be with her for the 1995–96 season. While in New Brunswick, he skipped a team to the final of the 1996 provincial men's championship, where he lost to Mike Kennedy. After the season, Dacey returned to his hometown of Saskatoon to rejoin the Heidt rink while Smith went to school in Scotland. Dacey only played one season in Saskatchewan before he and Smith moved to Halifax, Nova Scotia, in 1997.

Representing Nova Scotia, he reached the 2001 Nokia Brier, finishing with a 6-5 record. He finished third during the round-robin at the 2003 Nokia Brier in Halifax, with a 7-4 record. They lost the final to Randy Ferbey.

Dacey also won the 2002 Canadian Mixed Curling Championship. In 2005, Dacey could not win the Nova Scotia men's championship, precluding him from defending his National title at the 2005 Tim Hortons Brier. In 2006, Dacey recaptured the provincial championship to return to the Brier. His team finished 7-4 in the round-robin and defeated Alberta's Kevin Martin in the first playoff game. In the semifinal, they lost to eventual champion Jean-Michel Ménard of Quebec, earning a third-place finish.

The Dacey team announced it was taking a year off as of Tuesday, April 9, 2007.

However, in the 2008 Nova Scotia provincials, the team was back minus Dacey. Bruce Lohnes (Third), Rob Harris (Second), and Andrew Gibson (Lead) curled in the provincial finals with Colleen Jones' husband Scott Saunders skipping them.

Dacey won his second mixed title in November 2009 at the 2010 Canadian Mixed Curling Championship. This qualified him and his wife, Heather, to represent Canada at the 2010 World Mixed Doubles Curling Championship. However, they had to pull out after being delayed by the air travel disruption after the 2010 Eyjafjallajökull eruption.

== Teams ==
Event	Skip	Third	Second	Lead	Alternate	Result
1995 Brier	Brad Heidt	Mark Dacey	Wayne Charteris	Dan Ormsby		2nd
2001 Brier	Mark Dacey	Paul Flemming	Blayne Iskiw	Tom Fetterly		T-5th
2003 Brier	Mark Dacey	Bruce Lohnes	Rob Harris	Andrew Gibson	Steve Ogden	2nd
2004 Brier	Mark Dacey	Bruce Lohnes	Rob Harris	Andrew Gibson	Mat Harris	1st
2004 WCC	Mark Dacey	Bruce Lohnes	Rob Harris	Andrew Gibson	Mat Harris	3rd
2006 Brier	Mark Dacey	Bruce Lohnes	Rob Harris	Andrew Gibson		3rd
2010 CM	Mark Dacey	Heather Smith-Dacey	Andrew Gibson	Jill Mouzar		1st

== Grand Slam record ==
Key
C	Champion
F	Lost in Final
SF	Lost in Semifinal
QF	Lost in Quarterfinals
R16	Lost in the round of 16
Q	Did not advance to playoffs
T2	Played in Tier 2 event
DNP	Did not participate in event
N/A	Not a Grand Slam event that season

Event	2003–04	2004–05	2005–06	2006–07	2007–08	2008–09	2009–10	2010–11	2011–12	2012–13	2013–14
Masters	SF	Q	Q	DNP	DNP	DNP	DNP	DNP	DNP	DNP	DNP
Canadian Open	DNP	DNP	DNP	DNP	DNP	DNP	DNP	DNP	DNP	DNP	DNP
The National	DNP	Q	DNP	DNP	DNP	DNP	DNP	DNP	DNP	DNP	Q
Players'	DNP	Q	Q	DNP	DNP	DNP	DNP	DNP	DNP	DNP	DNP

== Personal life ==
He was the husband of 2004 Nova Scotia women's curling champion Heather Smith; they separated in 2013.
