= Rob Harris (curler) =

Canadian curler

Medal record

Men's curling

World Curling Championships
Bronze medal – third place	2004 Gävle	

Tim Hortons Brier
Bronze medal – third place	2006 Regina	
Gold medal – first place	2004 Saskatoon	
Silver medal – second place	2003 Halifax	

Robert Harris (born September 26, 1963, in Halifax, Nova Scotia) is a Canadian curler.

Harris played second for Mark Dacey's men's team from 2002 to 2007 and from 1998 to 1999. Harris also played Mixed with Dacey around this time. Harris, Dacey, third Heather Smith-Dacey and lead Laine Peters won the Canadian Mixed Curling Championships in 2002 after having gone to the tournament the two previous years. Playing for Dacey's men's team which included Bruce Lohnes at third and Andrew Gibson at lead, Harris won three provincial championships (2003, 2004, 2006), a Brier in 2004 and a bronze medal at the World Curling Championships the same year.

Harris along with Dacey, Lohnes and Gibson also participated in two Continental Cups, in 2004 and 2005. They were on the losing side in 2004, but won the event as part of team North America in 2005.

Prior to playing for Dacey, Harris skipped his own rink, except for one season which he played third for Shawn Adams.

Harris is also a NCCP Level II Coach and has represented the Province of Nova Scotia, coaching Junior Men's Teams in 1990, 1991 and 2010.

Harris is a Project Manager at the I.T. consulting firm Keane Canada. Harris retired from competitive men's curling in 2007, but is active in senior's play.

== Grand Slam Record ==
Key
C	Champion
F	Lost in Final
SF	Lost in Semifinal
QF	Lost in Quarterfinals
R16	Lost in the round of 16
Q	Did not advance to playoffs
T2	Played in Tier 2 event
DNP	Did not participate in event
N/A	Not a Grand Slam event that season

Event	2003–04	2004–05	2005–06
Canadian Open	DNP	DNP	DNP
Masters	SF	Q	Q
The National	DNP	Q	DNP
Players' Championships	DNP	Q	Q
