= Mike Adam =

Canadian curler (born 1981)

Personal information
- Born: June 3, 1981 (age 45) Labrador City, Newfoundland and Labrador, Canada
- Height: 5 ft 8 1/2 in (174 cm)
- Weight: 209 lb (95 kg)
Medal record
Men's curling
Representing Canada
Olympic Games
| Gold medal – first place | 2006 Turin | Team |
Canadian Olympic Curling Trials
| Gold medal – first place | 2005 Halifax |
World Junior Curling Championships
| Gold medal – first place | 2001 Ogden |
Representing Newfoundland and Labrador
Canada Games
| Bronze medal – third place | 1999 Corner Brook |

Michael B. Adam, ONL (born June 3, 1981) is a Canadian curler who won gold at the 2006 Winter Olympics.

== Biography ==
Born in Labrador City, Newfoundland and Labrador, Adam won a bronze medal at the Canada Winter Games in 1999.

Adam was part of Gushue's 2001 Canadian Junior Curling Championships winning team, when he played lead. Adam returned the following year at the 2002 Canadian Juniors, but played third for Ryan Ledrew, and finished 4–8. He was still on Gushue's team as well, and played second at the provincials that year. In 2003, they won provincials, but by this time Adam was just the team's alternate. In 2004 Adam moved to Keith Ryan's team where he played second. Failing to win at the provincials with Ryan, Adam joined Gushue who had won provincials as his alternate at the 2004 Nokia Brier. In 2005 Adam was left off the team, but rejoined in 2006 as the alternate once again for the Olympics. He was replaced for the 2006–07 season.

Adam was the alternate for the Canadian 2006 Winter Olympics curling team skipped by Brad Gushue. As the team's alternate, he only played one game when lead Jamie Korab was ill.

== Awards ==
- World Junior Curling Championship: Sportsmanship Award - 2001
