= Marcel Rocque =

Canadian curler

- Curler

Curling career
- Brier: 5 (2001, 2002, 2003, 2004, 2005)
- World Championship: 4 (2001, 2002, 2003, 2005)
- Top CTRS ranking: 2nd (2004-05 & 2005-06)
- Grand Slam victories: 3: World Cup/Masters (Feb 2006); Players (2006, 2009)
Medal record
Curling
Representing Canada
World Championships
| Gold medal – first place | 2002 Bismarck |
| Gold medal – first place | 2003 Winnipeg |
| Gold medal – first place | 2005 Victoria |
Representing Alberta
Brier
| Gold medal – first place | 2005 Edmonton |
| Gold medal – first place | 2003 Halifax |
| Gold medal – first place | 2002 Calgary |
| Gold medal – first place | 2001 Ottawa |
| Silver medal – second place | 2004 Saskatoon |

Marcel Rocque (born June 22, 1971, in St. Paul, Alberta) is a Canadian curler from Edmonton, Alberta. He is a four-time winner of The Brier, the annual Canadian men's curling championship and a three-time World Champion as the lead for the Randy Ferbey team. Rocque would play in two Alberta provincial championships as a lead for Don Walchuk before joining the Ferbey team by 1999.

In 2019, Rocque finished second in a TSN poll of broadcasters, reporters and top curlers to name the greatest Canadian male lead in curling history.

In 2023 Rocque and his Team Ferbey rinkmates (Randy Ferbey, David Nedohin, and Scott Pfeifer) were inducted into Canada's Sports Hall of Fame.

== Coaching ==
Marcel Rocque began coaching the Chinese women's team in 2013 and was the coach for China's Men Curling team for the 2014 Winter Olympics held in Sochi, Russia. He helped the team reach the fourth position in final rankings. He was also the coach for China Mixed Doubles at the 2018 Winter Olympics. Starting in the 2018-19 curling season, he became the coach for Team Homan. He currently coaches the Clancy Grandy rink.

== Personal life ==
Rocque is a third cousin to curler Kelsey Rocque. His wife Raylene is also a curler, and until the end of the 2009/2010 Season played with Cathy King's team. Cathy and Raylene have now retired from the game. He has two daughters and is employed as a baking and culinary teacher.
