= Scott Pfeifer =

Canadian male curler and coach

- Curler
- Born: January 5, 1977 (age 49); St. Albert, Alberta, Canada

Team
- Curling club: St. Albert CC, St. Albert, AB

Curling career
- Member Association: Alberta
- Brier: 7 (2001, 2002, 2003, 2004, 2005, 2016, 2017)
- World Championship: 5 (2001, 2002, 2003, 2005, 2016)
- Olympic: 1 (2018)
- Top CTRS ranking: 2nd (2004–05 & 2005–06)
- Grand Slam victories: 3: World Cup/Masters (Feb 2006); Players (2006, 2009)
Medal record
Men's curling
Representing Canada
World Championships
Gold medal – first place	2002 Bismarck
Gold medal – first place	2003 Winnipeg
Gold medal – first place	2005 Victoria
Gold medal – first place	2016 Basel
World Junior Championships
Gold medal – first place	1994 Sofia
Bronze medal – third place	1997 Karuizawa
Brier
Silver medal – second place	2017 St. John's
Representing Alberta
Canadian Olympic Curling Trials
Gold medal – first place	2017 Ottawa
Brier
Gold medal – first place	2001 Ottawa
Gold medal – first place	2002 Calgary
Gold medal – first place	2003 Halifax
Gold medal – first place	2005 Edmonton
Gold medal – first place	2016 Ottawa
Silver medal – second place	2004 Saskatoon

Scott Pfeifer (born January 5, 1977, in St. Albert, Alberta) is a Canadian curler from Sherwood Park, Alberta, Canada who plays out of the St. Albert Curling Club in St. Albert. He was the long-time second for the Randy Ferbey rink from 1998 to 2010, winning four Briers and three World championships with the team. He later served as the alternate for the Kevin Koe rink with whom he won a Brier and world championship, and represented Canada at the 2018 Winter Olympics.

Pfeifer won the 1994 Canadian Junior Curling Championships and 1994 World Junior Curling Championships as a second for Colin Davison. At the 1997 Canadian Juniors Pfeifer threw fourth stones for Ryan Keane and would win his second national junior championship. He finished third at the '97 World Junior Curling Championships and became the '98 Shamrock Poor Boy champion. By 1999, he had joined the Randy Ferbey team, for whom he played second. As a member of Team Ferbey, Pfeifer won Briers in 2001, 2002, 2003 and 2005 and World championships in 2002, 2003 and 2005.

For the 2010–11 and 2011–12 curling season, Pfeifer's curling career was put on hiatus. Pfeifer returned to competitive curling for the 2012–13 season, playing second for Jamie King for two more seasons.

Pfeifer won the 2016 Tim Hortons Brier as the alternate for Team Alberta (skipped by Kevin Koe) and won the 2016 World Men's Curling Championship with the team. They also won the 2017 Canadian Olympic Curling Trials and represented Canada at the 2018 Winter Olympics where they lost the bronze medal game to Switzerland's Peter de Cruz.

Pfeifer is currently a performance consultant for Curling Canada

In 2023 Pfeifer and his Team Ferbey rinkmates (Randy Ferbey, David Nedohin and Marcel Rocque) were inducted into Canada's Sports Hall of Fame.

== Personal life ==
Pfeifer is married and has two children.
