= David Nedohin =

Canadian curler (born 1973)

- Curler ♂
- Nedohin (middle left) with the "Ferbey Four" in 2010
- Born: December 20, 1973 (age 52); Winnipeg, Manitoba, Canada

Team
- Curling club: Saville Sports Centre, Edmonton, AB
- Mixed doubles partner: Alyssa Nedohin

Curling career
- Member Association: Alberta
- Brier: 5 (2001, 2002, 2003, 2004, 2005)
- World Championship: 4 (2001, 2002, 2003, 2005)
- Top CTRS ranking: 2nd (2004-05 & 2005-06)
- Grand Slam victories: 4: World Cup/Masters (Feb 2006); Players (2006, 2009, 2014)
Medal record
Representing Canada
Men's curling
World Championships
Gold medal – first place	2002 Bismarck
Gold medal – first place	2003 Winnipeg
Gold medal – first place	2005 Victoria
Representing Alberta
Canadian Olympic Curling Trials
Bronze medal – third place	2013 Winnipeg
Brier
Gold medal – first place	2001 Ottawa
Gold medal – first place	2002 Calgary
Gold medal – first place	2003 Halifax
Gold medal – first place	2005 Edmonton
Silver medal – second place	2004 Saskatoon

David Nedohin (born December 20, 1973) is a Canadian curler. Nedohin was born in Winnipeg, Manitoba and now lives in Sherwood Park, Alberta. He is best known as the longtime fourth for Randy Ferbey. He currently coaches the Myla Plett rink.

== Curling career ==
Nedohin joined the Randy Ferbey rink in 1997 and was a part of that team's four Brier championships and three world championships. Nedohin is renowned for his shotmaking ability - especially for making difficult combination takeout shots. Nedohin had a shooting percentage of 96% in the final of the 2003 Nokia Brier, and 95% shooting percentage in the final of the 2005 Men's Ford World Curling Championships. The team, famously named The Ferbey Four, popularized the "fourth" shooting position. Because of Nedohin's shotmaking ability, he threw the last two stones in each end, or the skip rocks. This meant that Ferbey, the skip, threw third stones while the front end positions remained the same. Because Nedohin was not the skip, he was labeled as the "fourth".

In 2010, The Ferbey Four split up with Ferbey joining the Brad Gushue. However, when Ferbey was dropped by the Gushue rink near playdown time, Ferbey and Nedohin re-joined forces again. They made it to the 2011 Boston Pizza Cup.

The 2011/2012 season saw Nedohin and Ferbey try to repeat their previous success by bringing Ted Appelman and Brendan Melnyk to the new team. After a very successful World Curling Tour season in which they qualified for every event they played in except for the Grand Slams, the team failed to qualify for the Northern Alberta Regionals. They lost the Edmonton Zone to Kevin Park. The result saw the team disband as Ferbey retired from competition. Nedohin would announce shortly later that the 2012/2013 season would see him playing with Colin Hodgson, Tom Sallows and Mike Westlund. There were many comparisons made between the newly formed team and early days of 'The Ferbey Four' based on age and experience. Nedohin joined Kevin Martin's team in the 2013–14 curling season after the departure of John Morris, throwing third stones.

He has not officially announced retiring, but has curled very little since the 2014 season, focusing both on family life and curling commentary work.

In 2023 Nedohin and his Team Ferbey rinkmates (Randy Ferbey, Scott Pfeifer and Marcel Rocque) were inducted into Canada's Sports Hall of Fame.

== Personal ==
Nedohin is the founder and president of Scope AR, a developer of augmented reality solutions and products for field maintenance, manufacturing, and training. He is married to Heather Nedohin and has two daughters. He was also an analyst for CurlTV.com. He attended Oak Park High School in Winnipeg and the University of Manitoba.

== Teams ==
Season	Skip	Third	Second	Lead	Events
1995–96	Arnold Asham	David Nedohin	Sean Nedohin	Don Rudd	
1996–97	Dale Duguid	James Kirkness	David Nedohin	Doug Armstrong	
1997–98	David Nedohin (fourth)	Randy Ferbey (skip)	Carter Rycroft	Pat McCallum	
1998–99	David Nedohin (fourth)	Randy Ferbey (skip)	Scott Pfeifer	Carter Rycroft	
1999-00	David Nedohin (fourth)	Randy Ferbey (skip)	Scott Pfeifer	Marcel Rocque	
2000–01	David Nedohin (fourth)	Randy Ferbey (skip)	Scott Pfeifer	Marcel Rocque	2001 Alta., Brier, WCC
2001–02	David Nedohin (fourth)	Randy Ferbey (skip)	Scott Pfeifer	Marcel Rocque	2002 Alta., Brier, WCC
2002–03	David Nedohin (fourth)	Randy Ferbey (skip)	Scott Pfeifer	Marcel Rocque	2003 Alta., Brier, WCC
2003–04	David Nedohin (fourth)	Randy Ferbey (skip)	Scott Pfeifer	Marcel Rocque	2004 Alta., Brier
2004–05	David Nedohin (fourth)	Randy Ferbey (skip)	Scott Pfeifer	Marcel Rocque	2005 Alta., Brier, WCC
2007–08	David Nedohin (fourth)	Randy Ferbey (skip)	Scott Pfeifer	Marcel Rocque	2008 Alta.
2008–09	David Nedohin (fourth)	Randy Ferbey (skip)	Scott Pfeifer	Marcel Rocque	2009 Alta.
2009–10	David Nedohin (fourth)	Randy Ferbey (skip)	Scott Pfeifer	Marcel Rocque	2009 COCT, 2010 Alta.
2010–11	Randy Ferbey	David Nedohin	Blayne Iskiw	David Harper	2011 Alta.
2011–12	David Nedohin (fourth)	Randy Ferbey (skip)	Ted Appelman	Brendan Melnyk	
2012–13	David Nedohin	Colin Hodgson	Mike Westlund	Tom Sallows	
2013–14	Kevin Martin	David Nedohin	Marc Kennedy	Ben Hebert	2013 COCT, 2014 Alta.
