= Bruce Lohnes =

Canadian curler

- Curler
- Born: October 10, 1958 (age 68); Sydney, Nova Scotia

Curling career
- Brier: 7 (1989, 1992, 1995, 2003, 2004, 2006, 2009)
- World Championship: (2004)
- Top CTRS ranking: 7th (2003-04)
Medal record
Men's Curling
Representing Nova Scotia
Brier
Gold medal – first place	2004 Nokia Brier
Silver medal – second place	2003 Nokia Brier
Bronze medal – third place	2006 Tim Hortons Brier
World Curling Championships
Bronze medal – third place	2004 Gävle

Bruce D. Lohnes (born October 10, 1958) is a Canadian curler from Valley, Nova Scotia. Lohnes is a former Brier champion and World Championship bronze medallist. Lohnes is currently a high performance junior coach with the Nova Scotia Curling Association.

Lohnes joined the Mark Dacey rink prior to the 2002-03 season, playing third on the team. Representing Nova Scotia, they would go on to win the 2004 Nokia Brier and a bronze at the 2004 Ford World Curling Championships for Canada. The team had been to three Briers together, returning in 2006, winning a bronze medal and 2009, finishing 10th. Lohnes had also been to three other Briers, but with different teams. He played third for Ragnar Kamp in 1989, third for David Jones in 1992 and as a skip in 1995.

== Personal life ==
Lohnes is retired from the Nova Scotia Department of Natural Resources. He is married to Carolyn Stewart.
