= Andrew Gibson (curler) =

Canadian curler

- Curler
- Born: May 31, 1979 (age 47); Halifax, Nova Scotia

Team
- Curling club: Lakeshore CC, Sackville, NS
- Skip: Andrew Gibson
- Third: Mike Flemming
- Second: Kris Granchelli
- Lead: Jake Flemming

Curling career
- Brier: 5 (2003, 2004, 2006, 2009, 2011)
- World Championship: 1 (2004)
- Top CTRS ranking: 7th (2003–04)
Medal record
Men's curling
Representing Canada
World Championships
Bronze medal – third place	2004 Gävle
Representing Nova Scotia
Tim Hortons Brier
Gold medal – first place	2004 Saskatoon
Silver medal – second place	2003 Halifax
Bronze medal – third place	2006 Regina

Andrew Gibson (born May 31, 1979) is a Canadian curler from Bedford, Nova Scotia.

== Career ==
=== Career with Mark Dacey ===
Gibson was a member of Mark Dacey's rink from 2003 to 2010. He has been to the Brier three times with Dacey (2003, 2004, 2006) winning the Brier in 2004. In 2004 he won a bronze medal at the World Curling Championships. Before playing for Dacey, Gibson played for Peter Eddy and had played in two Canadian Junior Curling Championships. At the 2010 Canadian Mixed Curling Championship, Gibson played second for Dacey and won the event.

=== Transition to Shawn Adams and return to Mark Dacey ===
Gibson left Dacey's team in 2010 to play for Shawn Adams. He would return to the Brier in 2011. After the disbanding of the Adams team, Gibson would return to play second for Mark Dacey.
