= 2003 Canada Cup of Curling =

2003 Strauss Canada Cup of Curling
- Host city: Kamloops, British Columbia
- Arena: Sport Mart Place
- Dates: January 8–12, 2003
- Attendance: 25,430
- Men's winner: (Alberta) Randy Ferbey
- Skip: Randy Ferbey
- Fourth: David Nedohin
- Second: Scott Pfeifer
- Lead: Marcel Rocque
- Coach: Neill Nedohin
- Finalist: (Ontario) John Morris
- Women's winner: (Ontario) Sherry Middaugh
- Skip: Sherry Middaugh
- Third: Kirsten Wall
- Second: Andrea Lawes
- Lead: Sheri Cordina
- Coach: Pat Reid
- Finalist: (British Columbia) Kelley Law

The 2003 Strauss Canada Cup of Curling was held January 8–12, 2003, at Sport Mart Place in Kamloops, British Columbia. The winning teams received berths into the 2005 Canadian Olympic Curling Trials, the 2003 Continental Cup of Curling and the 2004 Canada Cup of Curling. It was the inaugural edition of this event.

The winners were Randy Ferbey, who pocketed $53,000 after defeating John Morris, 7-5 in the men’s final and Sherry Middaugh, who earned $52,250 after beating Kelley Law, 8-7 in the women’s final.

== Men's event ==
=== Teams ===
The men's teams were as follows:

Skip	Third	Second	Lead	Alternate	Coach	Locale
Shawn Adams	Craig Burgess	Jeff Hopkins	Ben Blanchard		Neil Powers	Nova Scotia
Greg Balsdon	Don Bowser	Darryl Prebble	Rob Dickson	Chris Marshall		Ontario
David Nedohin	Randy Ferbey (skip)	Scott Pfeifer	Marcel Rocque		Neill Nedohin	Alberta
Russ Howard	James Grattan	Marc LeCocq	Grant Odishaw			New Brunswick
Brian Humble	Dean Kleiter	Terry Hersikorn	Kerry Tarasoff	Jim Orr		Saskatchewan
Kevin Koe	Jamie Koe	Scott Cripps	Mike Westlund	Ryan Albizzati	Bill Tschirhart	Alberta
John Morris	Joe Frans	Brent Laing	Craig Savill	T. J. Connolly		Ontario
Pat Ryan	Bob Ursel	Deane Horning	Kevin MacKenzie	Rob Koffski	Terry Bublitz	British Columbia
Pat Simmons	Joel Jordison	Ryan Miller	Neil Cursons	Gary Ford	Aryn Schmidt	Saskatchewan
Murray Woodward	Eric Goodman	Hubert Perrin	Mike Pohl			Manitoba

=== Preliminary round ===
Final standings

Key
Teams to Playoffs
Teams to Tiebreaker

Group A	W	L
(Alberta) Randy Ferbey	4	0
(British Columbia) Pat Ryan	2	2
(Alberta) Kevin Koe	2	2
(Saskatchewan) Pat Simmons	2	2
(Ontario) Greg Balsdon	0	4

Group B	W	L
(Ontario) John Morris	4	0
(Nova Scotia) Shawn Adams	3	1
(Saskatchewan) Brian Humble	2	2
(New Brunswick) Russ Howard	1	3
(Manitoba) Murray Woodward	0	4

=== Tiebreaker ===
Round 1		Round 2
		(Saskatchewan) Pat Simmons	4
(Alberta) Kevin Koe	4	(British Columbia) Pat Ryan	7
(British Columbia) Pat Ryan	11

=== Playoffs ===
Page playoff system
A1	Randy Ferbey	9
B1	John Morris	6
A2	Pat Ryan	5
B2	Shawn Adams	9

Semifinal
B1	John Morris	8
B2	Shawn Adams	5

Final
A1	Randy Ferbey	7
B1	John Morris	5

== Women's event ==
=== Teams ===
The women's teams were as follows:

Skip	Third	Second	Lead	Alternate	Coach	Locale
Sherry Anderson	Kim Hodson	Sandra Mulroney	Donna Gignac			Saskatchewan
Marilyn Bodogh/ Penny Shantz	Theresa Breen	Susan Froud	Sara Gatchell	Penny Shantz		Ontario
Suzanne Gaudet	Jean MacPhee	Robyn MacPhee	Susan McInnis			Prince Edward Island
Colleen Jones	Kim Kelly	Mary-Anne Waye	Nancy Delahunt			Nova Scotia
Kelley Law	Georgina Wheatcroft	Julie Skinner	Diane Dezura			British Columbia
Sherry Middaugh	Kirsten Wall	Andrea Lawes	Sheri Cordina		Pat Reid	Ontario
Heather Nedohin	Atina Johnston	Lawnie MacDonald	Rona Pasika		Bill Tschirart	Alberta
Patty Rochelaeau	Brandee Borne	Sherri Singler	Angela Mossman		Terri Farough	Saskatchewan
Kelly Scott	Jeanna Richard	Sasha Bergner	Renee Simons			British Columbia
Barb Spencer	Darcy Robertson	Barb Enright	Faye Unrau	Tanya Craig		Manitoba

=== Preliminary round ===
Final standings

Key
Teams to Playoffs
Teams to Tiebreaker

Group A	W	L
(Ontario) Sherry Middaugh	3	1
(Prince Edward Island) Suzanne Gaudet	3	1
(Nova Scotia) Colleen Jones	2	2
(Alberta) Heather Nedohin	1	3
(Saskatchewan) Patty Rochelaeau	1	3

Group B	W	L
(British Columbia) Kelley Law	4	0
(British Columbia) Kelly Scott	2	2
(Saskatchewan) Sherry Anderson	2	2
(Manitoba) Barb Spencer	1	3
(Ontario) Bodogh/Shantz	1	3

=== Tie breaker ===
- Kelly Scott 6, Sherry Anderson 5

=== Playoffs ===
Page playoff system
A1	Sherry Middaugh	8
B1	Kelley Law	6
A2	Suzanne Gaudet	9
B2	Kelly Scott	6

Semifinal
B1	Kelley Law	10
A2	Suzanne Gaudet	4

Final
A1	Sherry Middaugh	8
B1	Kelley Law	7
