= 2004 Canada Cup of Curling =

2004 Strauss Canada Cup of Curling
- Host city: Kamloops, British Columbia
- Arena: Sport Mart Place
- Dates: January 6-11, 2004
- Attendance: 27,138
- Men's winner: (Alberta) Randy Ferbey
- Curling club: Avonair Curling Club, Edmonton
- Skip: Randy Ferbey
- Fourth: David Nedohin
- Second: Scott Pfeifer
- Lead: Marcel Rocque
- Finalist: (Alberta) John Morris
- Women's winner: (Nova Scotia) Colleen Jones
- Curling club: Mayflower Curling Club, Halifax
- Skip: Colleen Jones
- Third: Kim Kelly
- Second: Mary-Anne Arsenault
- Lead: Nancy Delahunt
- Finalist: (Saskatchewan) Sherry Anderson

The 2004 Strauss Canada Cup of Curling was held January 6–11, 2004, at Sport Mart Place in Kamloops, British Columbia. The winning teams received berths into the 2005 Canadian Olympic Curling Trials, the 2004 Continental Cup of Curling and the 2005 Canada Cup of Curling.

2001 World Champion Colleen Jones and her rink from Halifax won the women's event, defeating Saskatchewan's Sherry Anderson in the final. As Jones had already qualified for the 2005 Olympic Trials, Anderson earned a berth for her team.

Two-time World Champion Randy Ferbey and his rink from Edmonton won the men's event, defeating Calgary's John Morris in the final. As Ferbey had also already qualified for the Olympic Trials, Morris' team qualified as well.

The total purse for the event was $180,000, with both the men's and women's champions winning $33,000.

== Men's event ==
=== Teams ===
The men's teams were as follows:

Skip	Third	Second	Lead	Locale
Kerry Burtnyk	Ken Tresoor	Rob Fowler	Keith Fenton	(Manitoba) Assiniboine Memorial Curling Club, Winnipeg
Peter Corner	Craig Kochan	Ian Robertson	Ken McDermot	(Ontario) Thornhill Country Club, Thornhill
Mark Dacey	Bruce Lohnes	Rob Harris	Andrew Gibson	(Nova Scotia) Mayflower Curling Club, Halifax
David Nedohin	Randy Ferbey (skip)	Scott Pfeifer	Marcel Rocque	(Alberta) Avonair Curling Club, Edmonton
Russ Howard	James Grattan	Marc LeCocq	Grant Odishaw	(New Brunswick) Beaver Curling Club, Moncton
Wayne Middaugh	Graeme McCarrel	Joe Frans	Scott Bailey	(Ontario) St. George's Golf and Country Club, Etobicoke, Toronto
Jamie Koe	Dan Petryk	Scott Cripps	Mike Westlund	(Alberta) Calgary Curling Club, Calgary
John Morris	Kevin Koe	Marc Kennedy	Paul Moffatt	(Alberta) Calgary Winter Club, Calgary
Jeff Stoughton	Jon Mead	Garry VanDenBerghe	Steve Gould	(Manitoba) Charleswood Curling Club, Winnipeg
Pat Simmons	Blake MacDonald*	Chris Haichert	Ben Hebert	(Saskatchewan) Swift Current Curling Club, Swift Current

* MacDonald replaced regular third Jeff Sharp

=== Preliminary round ===
Final standings

Key
Teams to Playoffs
Teams to Tiebreaker

Group A	W	L
(Ontario) Wayne Middaugh	3	1
(Alberta) John Morris	2	2
(Nova Scotia) Mark Dacey	2	2
(Manitoba) Kerry Burtnyk	2	2
(Alberta) Jamie Koe	1	3

Group B	W	L
(Alberta) Randy Ferbey	3	1
(New Brunswick) Russ Howard	3	1
(Manitoba) Jeff Stoughton	3	1
(Saskatchewan) Pat Simmons	1	3
(Ontario) Peter Corner	0	4

=== Tiebreaker ===
- Burtnyk 6, Dacey 5

=== Playoffs ===
Cross-over
B2	(New Brunswick) Russ Howard	4
A3	(Manitoba) Kerry Burtnyk	6
A2	(Alberta) John Morris	6
B3	(Manitoba) Jeff Stoughton	4

Page playoffs
A1	(Ontario) Wayne Middaugh	3
B1	(Alberta) Randy Ferbey	11
A2	(Alberta) John Morris	7
A3	(Manitoba) Kerry Burtnyk	5

Semi-final
A1	(Ontario) Wayne Middaugh	6
A2	(Alberta) John Morris	7

Final
B1	(Alberta) Randy Ferbey	10
A2	(Alberta) John Morris	3

== Women's event ==
=== Teams ===
The women's teams were as follows:

Skip	Third	Second	Lead	Locale
Sherry Anderson	Kim Hodson	Sandra Mulroney	Donna Gignac	(Saskatchewan) Delisle Curling Club, Delisle
Renelle Bryden	Nancy Smith	Carolyn Darbyshire	Shannon Mattheis	(Alberta) Calgary Curling Club, Calgary
Cathy Cunningham	Peg Goss	Kathy Kerr	Heather Martin	(Newfoundland and Labrador) St. John's Curling Club, St. John's
Virginia Jackson	Melanie Comstock	Lisa MacLeod	Hayley Clarke	(Nova Scotia) Mayflower Curling Club, Halifax
Colleen Jones	Kim Kelly	Mary-Anne Arsenault	Nancy Delahunt	(Nova Scotia) Mayflower Curling Club, Halifax
Jennifer Jones	Karen Porritt	Jill Officer	Lynn Fallis-Kurz	(Manitoba) St. Vital Curling Club, Winnipeg
Shannon Kleibrink	Amy Nixon	Glenys Bakker	Stephanie Marchand	(Alberta) Calgary Winter Club, Calgary
Sherry Middaugh	Kirsten Wall	Andrea Lawes	Sheri Cordina	(Ontario) Coldwater & District Recreation Centre, Coldwater
Kelly Scott	Jeanna Schraeder	Sasha Bergner	Renee Simons	(British Columbia) Kelowna Curling Club, Kelowna
Renée Sonnenberg	Nikki Smith	Tina McDonald	Karen McNamee	(Alberta) Sexsmith Curling Club, Sexsmith

=== Preliminary round ===
Final standings

Key
Teams to Playoffs
Teams to Tiebreaker

Group A	W	L
(Nova Scotia) Colleen Jones	3	1
(Ontario) Sherry Middaugh	3	1
(Newfoundland and Labrador) Cathy Cunningham	2	2
(Manitoba) Jennifer Jones	1	3
(Alberta) Renée Sonnenberg	1	3

Group B	W	L
(Saskatchewan) Sherry Anderson	3	1
(British Columbia) Kelly Scott	2	2
(Alberta) Shannon Kleibrink	2	2
(Nova Scotia) Virginia Jackson	2	2
(Alberta) Renelle Bryden	1	3

=== Tie breaker ===
- Jackson 7, Kleibrink 6

=== Playoffs ===
Cross-over
B2	(British Columbia) Kelly Scott	9
A3	(Newfoundland and Labrador) Cathy Cunningham	6
A2	(Ontario) Sherry Middaugh	7
B3	(Nova Scotia) Virginia Jackson	5

Page playoffs
A1	(Nova Scotia) Colleen Jones	6
B1	(Saskatchewan) Sherry Anderson	7
B2	(British Columbia) Kelly Scott	10
A2	(Ontario) Sherry Middaugh	4

Semi-final
A1	(Nova Scotia) Colleen Jones	6
B2	(British Columbia) Kelly Scott	5

Final
B1	(Saskatchewan) Sherry Anderson	7
A1	(Nova Scotia) Colleen Jones	8
