= Canada Cup (curling) =

Curling championship in Canada

- Established: 2003
- Abolished: 2021
- 2019 host city: Leduc, Alberta
- 2019 arena: Sobeys Arena
- Purse: $265,000 (2019)

The Canada Cup (branded as the Home Hardware Canada Cup for sponsorship reasons, and also referred to as the Canada Cup of Curling) was a major men's and women's curling championship in Canada, held from 2003 to 2019. It was organized by Curling Canada and was one of its major events on its "Season of Champions". The event was frequently used as a qualifier for various other events, such as the Canadian Olympic Curling Trials, Pre-Trials and Continental Cup. The Canada Cup was not held in 2013 and 2017 to avoid conflict with the Winter Olympic Games.

== Competition history ==
The first event was held in 2003 at the Sport Mart Place in Kamloops, British Columbia, the Cup's home until 2008. During this time the event was sponsored by the Strauss Herb Company. The first event featured a total purse of $220,000, divided equally for the men's and women's events. Subsequent events however have seen smaller purses available.

In 2004, a second tier of competition, the qualification rounds Canada Cup East and Canada Cup West were added. In 2006, this had changed to men's and women's qualification rounds. The qualifying rounds were held every year with the John Shea Insurance Canada Cup Qualifier being held at the Ottawa and Rideau curling clubs in Ottawa, Ontario and the Diversified Transportation Canada Cup Qualifier being held at the Saville Sports Centre in Edmonton, Alberta. The men's and women's qualifiers alternated between the two cities.

On February 18, 2008, the Canadian Curling Association announced that the 2009 finals of the Canada Cup of Curling would be held at the Farrell Agencies Arena in Yorkton, Saskatchewan.

The 2009-10 season was without a Canada Cup, with the event returning in December 2010 rather in the Spring like it had been previously. The Canada Cup qualifiers were abolished for the 2010 event, using a number of smaller bonspiels to feed the event. The 2010 event was held at the Medicine Hat Arena in Medicine Hat, Alberta.

The 2011 event in Cranbrook, British Columbia hosted seven teams of each gender instead of ten. The teams played in a round robin as in previous years, with the top three advancing to the playoff round. The second and third-placed teams played in the semifinal, and the winner faced the first-placed team in the final. The 2012 event used the same format.

At present, there are no longer any qualifying tournaments. Teams qualify based on their World Curling Tour Order of Merit rankings, with one spot reserved for the top-ranking non-qualified team on the Canadian Team Ranking System closer to the event.

Due to the COVID-19 pandemic in Canada, Curling Canada stated that the 2020 Canada Cup would likely be postponed to an unspecified date in 2021, citing its role in qualification for trials for the 2022 Winter Olympics. The 2021 event ultimately did not go ahead, and there are no plans to hold the event in the near future. It was replaced on Curling Canada's Season of Champions calendar by the PointsBet Invitational.

== Winners ==
=== Men ===
Event	Host city	Champion team	Runner-up team
2003	Kamloops, British Columbia	(Alberta) David Nedohin (Fourth), Randy Ferbey (Skip), Scott Pfeifer, Marcel Rocque	(Ontario) John Morris, Joe Frans, Craig Savill, Brent Laing
2004	Kamloops, British Columbia	(Alberta) David Nedohin (Fourth), Randy Ferbey (Skip), Scott Pfeifer, Marcel Rocque	(Alberta) John Morris, Kevin Koe, Marc Kennedy, Paul Moffatt
2005	Kamloops, British Columbia	(Alberta) Kevin Martin, Don Walchuk, Carter Rycroft, Don Bartlett	(Alberta) David Nedohin (Fourth), Randy Ferbey (Skip), Scott Pfeifer, Marcel Rocque
2006	Kamloops, British Columbia	(Alberta) Kevin Martin, Don Walchuk, Carter Rycroft, Don Bartlett	(Ontario) Glenn Howard, Richard Hart, Brent Laing, Craig Savill
2007	Kamloops, British Columbia	(Alberta) David Nedohin (Fourth), Randy Ferbey (Skip), Scott Pfeifer, Marcel Rocque	(Alberta) Kevin Martin, John Morris, Marc Kennedy, Ben Hebert
2008	Kamloops, British Columbia	(Alberta) Blake MacDonald (Fourth), Kevin Koe (Skip), Carter Rycroft, Nolan Thiessen	(Alberta) Kevin Martin, Kevin Park, Marc Kennedy, Ben Hebert
2009	Yorkton, Saskatchewan	(Alberta) Kevin Martin, John Morris, Marc Kennedy, Ben Hebert	(Alberta) David Nedohin (Fourth), Randy Ferbey (Skip), Scott Pfeifer, Marcel Rocque
2010	Medicine Hat, Alberta	(Ontario) Glenn Howard, Wayne Middaugh, Brent Laing, Craig Savill	(Alberta) Kevin Martin, John Morris, Marc Kennedy, Ben Hebert
2011	Cranbrook, British Columbia	(Alberta) Kevin Martin, John Morris, Marc Kennedy, Ben Hebert	(Ontario) Glenn Howard, Wayne Middaugh, Brent Laing, Craig Savill
2012	Moose Jaw, Saskatchewan	(Manitoba) Jeff Stoughton, Jon Mead, Reid Carruthers, Mark Nichols	(Ontario) Glenn Howard, Wayne Middaugh, Brent Laing, Craig Savill
2014	Camrose, Alberta	(Manitoba) Mike McEwen, B. J. Neufeld, Matt Wozniak, Denni Neufeld	(Ontario) Brad Jacobs, Ryan Fry, E. J. Harnden, Ryan Harnden
2015	Grande Prairie, Alberta	(Alberta) Kevin Koe, Marc Kennedy, Brent Laing, Ben Hebert	(Manitoba) Mike McEwen, B. J. Neufeld, Matt Wozniak, Denni Neufeld
2016	Brandon, Manitoba	(Manitoba) Reid Carruthers, Braeden Moskowy, Derek Samagalski, Colin Hodgson	(Newfoundland and Labrador) Mark Nichols, Charley Thomas, Brett Gallant, Geoff Walker
2018	Estevan, Saskatchewan	(Ontario) Brad Jacobs, Marc Kennedy, E. J. Harnden, Ryan Harnden	(Alberta) Kevin Koe, B. J. Neufeld, Colton Flasch, Ben Hebert
2019	Leduc, Alberta	(Ontario) John Epping, Ryan Fry, Mat Camm, Brent Laing	(Alberta) Kevin Koe, B. J. Neufeld, Colton Flasch, Ben Hebert

=== Women ===
Event	Host city	Champion team	Runner-up team
2003	Kamloops, British Columbia	(Ontario) Sherry Middaugh, Kirsten Wall, Andrea Lawes, Sheri Cordina	(British Columbia) Kelley Law, Georgina Wheatcroft, Julie Skinner, Diane Dezura
2004	Kamloops, British Columbia	(Nova Scotia) Colleen Jones, Kim Kelly, Mary-Anne Waye, Nancy Delahunt	(Saskatchewan) Sherry Anderson, Kim Hodson, Sandra Mulroney, Donna Gignac
2005	Kamloops, British Columbia	(Alberta) Shannon Kleibrink, Amy Nixon, Glenys Bakker, Christine Keshen	(Saskatchewan) Jan Betker, Sherry Linton, Joan McCusker, Marcia Gudereit
2006	Kamloops, British Columbia	(Alberta) Cathy King, Lori Armistead, Raylene Rocque, Tracy Bush	(Manitoba) Jennifer Jones, Cathy Overton-Clapham, Jill Officer, Georgina Wheatcroft
2007	Kamloops, British Columbia	(Manitoba) Jennifer Jones, Cathy Overton-Clapham, Jill Officer, Dawn Askin	(Alberta) Cathy King, Lori Armistead, Raylene Rocque, Diane Dealy
2008	Kamloops, British Columbia	(Saskatchewan) Stefanie Lawton, Marliese Kasner, Sherri Singler, Lana Vey	(British Columbia) Kelly Scott, Jeanna Schraeder, Sasha Carter, Renee Simons
2009	Yorkton, Saskatchewan	(Alberta) Shannon Kleibrink, Amy Nixon, Bronwen Webster, Chelsey Bell	(Quebec) Marie-France Larouche, Annie Lemay, Joëlle Sabourin, Véronique Brassard
2010	Medicine Hat, Alberta	(Saskatchewan) Stefanie Lawton, Sherry Anderson, Sherri Singler, Marliese Kasner	(Alberta) Cheryl Bernard, Susan O'Connor, Carolyn Darbyshire, Cori Morris
2011	Cranbrook, British Columbia	(Manitoba) Jennifer Jones, Kaitlyn Lawes, Joëlle Sabourin, Dawn Askin	(Manitoba) Chelsea Carey, Kristy Jenion, Kristen Foster, Lindsay Titheridge
2012	Moose Jaw, Saskatchewan	(Saskatchewan) Stefanie Lawton, Sherry Anderson, Sherri Singler, Marliese Kasner	(Manitoba) Kaitlyn Lawes, Kirsten Wall, Jill Officer, Dawn Askin
2014	Camrose, Alberta	(Alberta) Val Sweeting, Lori Olson-Johns, Dana Ferguson, Rachelle Brown	(Ontario) Rachel Homan, Emma Miskew, Joanne Courtney, Lisa Weagle
2015	Grande Prairie, Alberta	(Ontario) Rachel Homan, Emma Miskew, Joanne Courtney, Lisa Weagle	(Alberta) Val Sweeting, Lori Olson-Johns, Dana Ferguson, Rachelle Brown
2016	Brandon, Manitoba	(Manitoba) Jennifer Jones, Kaitlyn Lawes, Jill Officer, Dawn McEwen	(Ontario) Rachel Homan, Emma Miskew, Joanne Courtney, Lisa Weagle
2018	Estevan, Saskatchewan	(Manitoba) Jennifer Jones, Kaitlyn Lawes, Jocelyn Peterman, Dawn McEwen	(Manitoba) Kerri Einarson, Val Sweeting, Shannon Birchard, Briane Meilleur
2019	Leduc, Alberta	(Ontario) Rachel Homan, Emma Miskew, Joanne Courtney, Lisa Weagle	(Manitoba) Tracy Fleury, Selena Njegovan, Liz Fyfe, Kristin MacCuish
