= 2001 Scott Tournament of Hearts =

- Host city: Sudbury, Ontario
- Arena: Sudbury Community Arena
- Dates: February 17–25
- Attendance: 60,480
- Winner: Nova Scotia
- Curling club: Mayflower CC, Halifax
- Skip: Colleen Jones
- Third: Kim Kelly
- Second: Mary-Anne Waye
- Lead: Nancy Delahunt
- Alternate: Laine Peters
- Coach: Ken Bagnall
- Finalist: Canada (Kelley Law)

The 2001 Scott Tournament of Hearts, the Canadian women's national curling championship, was held from February 17 to 25, 2001 at the Sudbury Community Arena in Sudbury, Ontario. The total attendance for the week was 60,480.

In one of the most exciting finishes in tournament history, the 1999 champions, Team Nova Scotia, who was skipped by Colleen Jones won the event as they beat defending champions Kelley Law and Team Canada in the final 7–6 in an extra end. Down to their last rock with Canada sitting one in the extra end, Jones would come off her own stone and her shot rolled into the eight foot close enough for a measurement, which Nova Scotia won to capture the title. Canada forced an extra end when Law made a raise and peel on the Nova Scotia shot rock to score one.

This was Nova Scotia's fourth title overall and the third title skipped by Jones. Jones became the fourth skip to win three titles joining Vera Pezer, Connie Laliberte, and Sandra Schmirler as the only skips at the time to accomplish that feat. Jones' rink would go onto represent Canada at the 2001 Ford World Women's Curling Championship in Lausanne, Switzerland, which they won. The national championship also qualified them for the 2001 Canadian Olympic Curling Trials in Regina, Saskatchewan.

== Teams ==
The teams were listed as follows:

| Team Canada | Alberta | British Columbia |
|---|---|---|
| Richmond CC, Richmond Skip: Kelley Law; Third: Julie Skinner; Second: Georgina Wheatcroft; Lead: Diane Nelson; Alternate: Cheryl Noble | Sexsmith CC, Sexsmith Skip: Renée Sonnenberg; Third: Marcy Balderston (Note: For the first six ends of Draw 17, Team Alberta alternate Melody Vavrek threw second stones, second Tina McDonald threw third stones, while third Marcy Balderston sat out. Balderston would throw third stones for the final four ends with McDonald moving back to second.); Second: Tina McDonald (Note: Team Alberta alternate Melody Vavrek threw second stones in Draw 12.); Lead: Karen McNamee; Alternate: Melody Vavrek | Richmond CC, Richmond Skip: Shelley MacDonald (Note: For Draw 17, Team British Columbia alternate Rene Duplisse threw third stones, third Lisa Whitaker threw skip stones, while skip Shelley MacDonald sat out due to illness.); Third: Lisa Whitaker; Second: Adina Tasaka; Lead: Jacalyn Brown; Alternate: Rene Duplisse |
| Manitoba | New Brunswick | Newfoundland |
| St. Vital CC, Winnipeg Skip: Karen Young; Third: Janice Sandison; Second: Tammy Radchenka; Lead: Alison Harvey; Alternate: Denise Podolski | Thistle St. Andrews CC, Saint John Skip: Kathy Floyd; Third: Marie-Anne Power; Second: Allison Franey; Lead: Jane Arseneau; Alternate: Mary Harding | St. John's CC, St. John's Skip: Heather Strong; Third: Laura Strong; Second: Susan O'Leary; Lead: Michelle Baker; Alternate: Marcie Brown |
| Nova Scotia | Ontario | Prince Edward Island |
| Mayflower CC, Halifax Skip: Colleen Jones; Third: Kim Kelly; Second: Mary-Anne Waye; Lead: Nancy Delahunt; Alternate: Laine Peters | Coldwater & District CC, Coldwater Skip: Sherry Middaugh; Third: Janet Brown; Second: Andrea Lawes; Lead: Sheri Cordina; Alternate: Kirsten Harmark | Charlottetown CC, Charlottetown Skip: Shelly Bradley; Third: Janice MacCallum (Note: Team Prince Edward Island third Janice MacCallum was ill throughout the tournament and would miss all of Draws 5, 9, and 10 along with leaving after the fifth end of Draw 8. Alternate Nancy Cameron threw third stones for the last three ends of Draw 8 and all the other three draws MacCallum missed.); Second: Leslie Allan (Note: Team Prince Edward Island second Leslie Allan left the game after the fourth end of Draw 12 due to illness. Alternate Nancy Cameron threw second stones for the remainder for Draw 12 and for all of Draw 13 as Allan was still ill and unable to play.); Lead: Tricia MacGregor; Alternate: Nancy Cameron |
| Quebec | Saskatchewan | Northwest Territories/Yukon |
| CC Etchemin, Saint-Romuald & CC Victoria, Sainte-Foy Skip: Marie-France Larouche; Third: Nancy Belanger; Second: Annie Lemay; Lead: Valérie Grenier; Alternate: Karo Gagnon | Caledonian CC, Regina Skip: Michelle Ridgway; Third: Lorie Kehler; Second: Roberta Materi; Lead: Joan Stricker; Alternate: Kristy Lewis | Yellowknife CC, Yellowknife Skip: Kerry Koe; Third: Ainsley Holowec; Second: Stacey Treptau; Lead: Heather McCagg-Nystrom; Alternate: Dawn Moses |

== Map of teams ==
Team Canada Provincial Winners

== Round Robin standings ==
Final Round Robin standings

Key
| Teams to Playoffs |
| Teams to Tiebreaker |

| Locale | Skip | W | L | W–L | PF | PA | EW | EL | BE | SE | S% |
|---|---|---|---|---|---|---|---|---|---|---|---|
| Canada | Kelley Law | 8 | 3 | – | 79 | 55 | 46 | 39 | 4 | 13 | 81% |
| Nova Scotia | Colleen Jones | 7 | 4 | 2–1; 1–0 | 74 | 72 | 49 | 43 | 8 | 14 | 81% |
| Quebec | Marie-France Larouche | 7 | 4 | 2–1; 0–1 | 71 | 63 | 49 | 41 | 9 | 17 | 77% |
| Ontario | Sherry Middaugh | 7 | 4 | 1–2; 1–0 | 75 | 59 | 47 | 44 | 6 | 11 | 78% |
| Prince Edward Island | Shelly Bradley | 7 | 4 | 1–2; 0–1 | 78 | 59 | 47 | 41 | 6 | 15 | 78% |
| Manitoba | Karen Young | 6 | 5 | 1–0 | 76 | 74 | 47 | 50 | 10 | 12 | 77% |
| New Brunswick | Kathy Floyd | 6 | 5 | 0–1 | 77 | 66 | 49 | 45 | 5 | 14 | 77% |
| Saskatchewan | Michelle Ridgway | 4 | 7 | 2–1; 1–0 | 56 | 81 | 38 | 53 | 8 | 7 | 74% |
| Alberta | Renée Sonnenberg | 4 | 7 | 2–1; 0–1 | 66 | 84 | 44 | 49 | 7 | 8 | 78% |
| Newfoundland | Heather Strong | 4 | 7 | 1–2; 1–0 | 58 | 60 | 42 | 42 | 14 | 9 | 78% |
| British Columbia | Shelley MacDonald | 4 | 7 | 1–2; 0–1 | 70 | 79 | 50 | 44 | 4 | 15 | 78% |
| Northwest Territories/Yukon | Kerry Koe | 2 | 9 | – | 56 | 84 | 39 | 56 | 7 | 8 | 74% |

== Round Robin results ==
All draw times are listed in Eastern Time (UTC−05:00).

=== Draw 1 ===
Saturday, February 17, 1:30 pm

| Sheet A | 1 | 2 | 3 | 4 | 5 | 6 | 7 | 8 | 9 | 10 | 11 | Final |
|---|---|---|---|---|---|---|---|---|---|---|---|---|
| Manitoba (Young) | 0 | 0 | 1 | 0 | 0 | 0 | 1 | 3 | 0 | 0 | 3 | 8 |
| Quebec (Larouche) 🔨 | 0 | 0 | 0 | 2 | 1 | 0 | 0 | 0 | 1 | 1 | 0 | 5 |

| Sheet B | 1 | 2 | 3 | 4 | 5 | 6 | 7 | 8 | 9 | 10 | Final |
|---|---|---|---|---|---|---|---|---|---|---|---|
| New Brunswick (Floyd) | 0 | 1 | 1 | 0 | 1 | 1 | 0 | 2 | 1 | 2 | 9 |
| Saskatchewan (Ridgway) 🔨 | 2 | 0 | 0 | 3 | 0 | 0 | 2 | 0 | 0 | 0 | 7 |

| Sheet C | 1 | 2 | 3 | 4 | 5 | 6 | 7 | 8 | 9 | 10 | Final |
|---|---|---|---|---|---|---|---|---|---|---|---|
| Canada (Law) 🔨 | 0 | 3 | 0 | 0 | 3 | 0 | 3 | 0 | 1 | X | 10 |
| Alberta (Sonnenberg) | 0 | 0 | 2 | 0 | 0 | 2 | 0 | 2 | 0 | X | 6 |

| Sheet D | 1 | 2 | 3 | 4 | 5 | 6 | 7 | 8 | 9 | 10 | 11 | Final |
|---|---|---|---|---|---|---|---|---|---|---|---|---|
| Nova Scotia (Jones) | 0 | 1 | 1 | 1 | 0 | 1 | 0 | 1 | 0 | 0 | 1 | 6 |
| Ontario (Middaugh) 🔨 | 0 | 0 | 0 | 0 | 3 | 0 | 1 | 0 | 0 | 1 | 0 | 5 |

=== Draw 2 ===
Saturday, February 17, 7:30 pm

| Sheet A | 1 | 2 | 3 | 4 | 5 | 6 | 7 | 8 | 9 | 10 | Final |
|---|---|---|---|---|---|---|---|---|---|---|---|
| Alberta (Sonnenberg) 🔨 | 0 | 2 | 0 | 0 | 0 | 2 | 1 | 0 | 0 | X | 5 |
| Nova Scotia (Jones) | 2 | 0 | 2 | 3 | 0 | 0 | 0 | 1 | 1 | X | 9 |

| Sheet B | 1 | 2 | 3 | 4 | 5 | 6 | 7 | 8 | 9 | 10 | Final |
|---|---|---|---|---|---|---|---|---|---|---|---|
| Northwest Territories/Yukon (Koe) 🔨 | 0 | 0 | 1 | 0 | 1 | 0 | 2 | 0 | 0 | 0 | 4 |
| Newfoundland (Strong) | 0 | 0 | 0 | 0 | 0 | 1 | 0 | 1 | 0 | 1 | 3 |

| Sheet C | 1 | 2 | 3 | 4 | 5 | 6 | 7 | 8 | 9 | 10 | Final |
|---|---|---|---|---|---|---|---|---|---|---|---|
| British Columbia (MacDonald) 🔨 | 1 | 0 | 1 | 0 | 1 | 0 | 0 | 2 | 1 | 0 | 6 |
| Prince Edward Island (Bradley) | 0 | 0 | 0 | 2 | 0 | 3 | 2 | 0 | 0 | 1 | 8 |

| Sheet D | 1 | 2 | 3 | 4 | 5 | 6 | 7 | 8 | 9 | 10 | Final |
|---|---|---|---|---|---|---|---|---|---|---|---|
| Manitoba (Young) 🔨 | 1 | 2 | 0 | 1 | 0 | 1 | 0 | 0 | 0 | 2 | 7 |
| Saskatchewan (Ridgway) | 0 | 0 | 3 | 0 | 1 | 0 | 1 | 0 | 0 | 0 | 5 |

=== Draw 3 ===
Sunday, February 18, 9:00 am

| Sheet B | 1 | 2 | 3 | 4 | 5 | 6 | 7 | 8 | 9 | 10 | Final |
|---|---|---|---|---|---|---|---|---|---|---|---|
| British Columbia (MacDonald) 🔨 | 0 | 0 | 1 | 0 | 3 | 0 | 0 | 0 | 1 | 0 | 5 |
| Canada (Law) | 0 | 3 | 0 | 1 | 0 | 1 | 1 | 1 | 0 | 1 | 8 |

| Sheet C | 1 | 2 | 3 | 4 | 5 | 6 | 7 | 8 | 9 | 10 | Final |
|---|---|---|---|---|---|---|---|---|---|---|---|
| Ontario (Middaugh) 🔨 | 2 | 0 | 1 | 0 | 2 | 0 | 1 | 0 | 1 | 0 | 7 |
| Manitoba (Young) | 0 | 0 | 0 | 3 | 0 | 1 | 0 | 4 | 0 | 1 | 9 |

=== Draw 4 ===
Sunday, February 18, 1:30 pm

| Sheet A | 1 | 2 | 3 | 4 | 5 | 6 | 7 | 8 | 9 | 10 | Final |
|---|---|---|---|---|---|---|---|---|---|---|---|
| Northwest Territories/Yukon (Koe) 🔨 | 0 | 2 | 0 | 0 | 0 | 1 | 0 | 0 | 0 | X | 3 |
| British Columbia (MacDonald) | 0 | 0 | 1 | 1 | 1 | 0 | 1 | 1 | 2 | X | 7 |

| Sheet B | 1 | 2 | 3 | 4 | 5 | 6 | 7 | 8 | 9 | 10 | Final |
|---|---|---|---|---|---|---|---|---|---|---|---|
| Prince Edward Island (Bradley) 🔨 | 1 | 0 | 1 | 2 | 4 | 0 | 0 | 3 | X | X | 11 |
| Alberta (Sonnenberg) | 0 | 1 | 0 | 0 | 0 | 3 | 2 | 0 | X | X | 6 |

| Sheet C | 1 | 2 | 3 | 4 | 5 | 6 | 7 | 8 | 9 | 10 | Final |
|---|---|---|---|---|---|---|---|---|---|---|---|
| Saskatchewan (Ridgway) 🔨 | 0 | 3 | 3 | 0 | 1 | 0 | 0 | 1 | 0 | 1 | 9 |
| Newfoundland (Strong) | 1 | 0 | 0 | 1 | 0 | 1 | 1 | 0 | 2 | 0 | 6 |

| Sheet D | 1 | 2 | 3 | 4 | 5 | 6 | 7 | 8 | 9 | 10 | Final |
|---|---|---|---|---|---|---|---|---|---|---|---|
| Quebec (Larouche) 🔨 | 0 | 2 | 1 | 0 | 0 | 1 | 0 | 0 | 0 | X | 4 |
| New Brunswick (Floyd) | 0 | 0 | 0 | 2 | 0 | 0 | 2 | 1 | 2 | X | 7 |

=== Draw 5 ===
Sunday, February 18, 7:30 pm

| Sheet A | 1 | 2 | 3 | 4 | 5 | 6 | 7 | 8 | 9 | 10 | Final |
|---|---|---|---|---|---|---|---|---|---|---|---|
| Canada (Law) 🔨 | 3 | 0 | 1 | 0 | 1 | 0 | 2 | 1 | X | X | 8 |
| Ontario (Middaugh) | 0 | 1 | 0 | 1 | 0 | 1 | 0 | 0 | X | X | 3 |

| Sheet B | 1 | 2 | 3 | 4 | 5 | 6 | 7 | 8 | 9 | 10 | Final |
|---|---|---|---|---|---|---|---|---|---|---|---|
| Nova Scotia (Jones) 🔨 | 1 | 0 | 2 | 0 | 0 | 4 | 0 | 2 | X | X | 9 |
| Quebec (Larouche) | 0 | 1 | 0 | 0 | 2 | 0 | 1 | 0 | X | X | 4 |

| Sheet C | 1 | 2 | 3 | 4 | 5 | 6 | 7 | 8 | 9 | 10 | Final |
|---|---|---|---|---|---|---|---|---|---|---|---|
| New Brunswick (Floyd) 🔨 | 1 | 0 | 2 | 0 | 1 | 0 | 1 | 2 | 4 | X | 11 |
| Northwest Territories/Yukon (Koe) | 0 | 2 | 0 | 1 | 0 | 2 | 0 | 0 | 0 | X | 5 |

| Sheet D | 1 | 2 | 3 | 4 | 5 | 6 | 7 | 8 | 9 | 10 | 11 | Final |
|---|---|---|---|---|---|---|---|---|---|---|---|---|
| Newfoundland (Strong) 🔨 | 0 | 0 | 1 | 0 | 1 | 0 | 2 | 1 | 0 | 1 | 0 | 6 |
| Prince Edward Island (Bradley) | 0 | 0 | 0 | 1 | 0 | 3 | 0 | 0 | 2 | 0 | 1 | 7 |

=== Draw 6 ===
Monday, February 19, 9:00 am

| Sheet A | 1 | 2 | 3 | 4 | 5 | 6 | 7 | 8 | 9 | 10 | 11 | Final |
|---|---|---|---|---|---|---|---|---|---|---|---|---|
| Quebec (Larouche) 🔨 | 1 | 0 | 2 | 0 | 2 | 0 | 1 | 0 | 1 | 0 | 2 | 9 |
| Alberta (Sonnenberg) | 0 | 1 | 0 | 1 | 0 | 1 | 0 | 2 | 0 | 2 | 0 | 7 |

| Sheet B | 1 | 2 | 3 | 4 | 5 | 6 | 7 | 8 | 9 | 10 | Final |
|---|---|---|---|---|---|---|---|---|---|---|---|
| Saskatchewan (Ridgway) 🔨 | 1 | 0 | 1 | 0 | 2 | 0 | 0 | 2 | 1 | 0 | 7 |
| Northwest Territories/Yukon (Koe) | 0 | 1 | 0 | 2 | 0 | 0 | 1 | 0 | 0 | 0 | 4 |

| Sheet C | 1 | 2 | 3 | 4 | 5 | 6 | 7 | 8 | 9 | 10 | Final |
|---|---|---|---|---|---|---|---|---|---|---|---|
| Prince Edward Island (Bradley) 🔨 | 1 | 0 | 0 | 1 | 0 | 2 | 0 | 0 | 3 | X | 7 |
| Canada (Law) | 0 | 1 | 0 | 0 | 1 | 0 | 1 | 0 | 0 | X | 3 |

| Sheet D | 1 | 2 | 3 | 4 | 5 | 6 | 7 | 8 | 9 | 10 | Final |
|---|---|---|---|---|---|---|---|---|---|---|---|
| Ontario (Middaugh) 🔨 | 2 | 0 | 3 | 0 | 4 | 0 | 1 | 0 | X | X | 10 |
| British Columbia (MacDonald) | 0 | 1 | 0 | 1 | 0 | 1 | 0 | 1 | X | X | 4 |

=== Draw 7 ===
Monday, February 19, 1:30 pm

| Sheet A | 1 | 2 | 3 | 4 | 5 | 6 | 7 | 8 | 9 | 10 | Final |
|---|---|---|---|---|---|---|---|---|---|---|---|
| British Columbia (MacDonald) 🔨 | 2 | 0 | 1 | 0 | 2 | 2 | 2 | 0 | 0 | 1 | 10 |
| Manitoba (Young) | 0 | 1 | 0 | 4 | 0 | 0 | 0 | 2 | 1 | 0 | 8 |

| Sheet B | 1 | 2 | 3 | 4 | 5 | 6 | 7 | 8 | 9 | 10 | Final |
|---|---|---|---|---|---|---|---|---|---|---|---|
| Newfoundland (Strong) 🔨 | 0 | 2 | 0 | 0 | 1 | 0 | 0 | 0 | 1 | 0 | 4 |
| Ontario (Middaugh) | 0 | 0 | 1 | 0 | 0 | 1 | 1 | 0 | 0 | 3 | 6 |

| Sheet C | 1 | 2 | 3 | 4 | 5 | 6 | 7 | 8 | 9 | 10 | Final |
|---|---|---|---|---|---|---|---|---|---|---|---|
| Alberta (Sonnenberg) 🔨 | 0 | 0 | 1 | 1 | 1 | 0 | 0 | 0 | 1 | 0 | 4 |
| Saskatchewan (Ridgway) | 1 | 1 | 0 | 0 | 0 | 0 | 2 | 0 | 0 | 2 | 6 |

| Sheet D | 1 | 2 | 3 | 4 | 5 | 6 | 7 | 8 | 9 | 10 | Final |
|---|---|---|---|---|---|---|---|---|---|---|---|
| New Brunswick (Floyd) 🔨 | 3 | 0 | 2 | 0 | 1 | 0 | 3 | 0 | 2 | X | 11 |
| Nova Scotia (Jones) | 0 | 2 | 0 | 1 | 0 | 1 | 0 | 1 | 0 | X | 5 |

=== Draw 8 ===
Monday, February 19, 7:30 pm

| Sheet A | 1 | 2 | 3 | 4 | 5 | 6 | 7 | 8 | 9 | 10 | Final |
|---|---|---|---|---|---|---|---|---|---|---|---|
| Nova Scotia (Jones) 🔨 | 0 | 0 | 0 | 2 | 0 | 0 | 1 | 0 | X | X | 3 |
| Prince Edward Island (Bradley) | 0 | 0 | 3 | 0 | 3 | 1 | 0 | 5 | X | X | 12 |

| Sheet B | 1 | 2 | 3 | 4 | 5 | 6 | 7 | 8 | 9 | 10 | Final |
|---|---|---|---|---|---|---|---|---|---|---|---|
| Canada (Law) 🔨 | 0 | 1 | 0 | 3 | 1 | 3 | X | X | X | X | 8 |
| New Brunswick (Floyd) | 1 | 0 | 0 | 0 | 0 | 0 | X | X | X | X | 1 |

| Sheet C | 1 | 2 | 3 | 4 | 5 | 6 | 7 | 8 | 9 | 10 | 11 | Final |
|---|---|---|---|---|---|---|---|---|---|---|---|---|
| Manitoba (Young) 🔨 | 0 | 0 | 1 | 1 | 0 | 0 | 1 | 1 | 0 | 1 | 0 | 5 |
| Newfoundland (Strong) | 0 | 1 | 0 | 0 | 1 | 0 | 0 | 0 | 3 | 0 | 2 | 7 |

| Sheet D | 1 | 2 | 3 | 4 | 5 | 6 | 7 | 8 | 9 | 10 | Final |
|---|---|---|---|---|---|---|---|---|---|---|---|
| Northwest Territories/Yukon (Koe) 🔨 | 1 | 0 | 2 | 0 | 0 | 0 | 0 | 1 | 0 | X | 4 |
| Quebec (Larouche) | 0 | 3 | 0 | 1 | 2 | 1 | 1 | 0 | 1 | X | 9 |

=== Draw 9 ===
Tuesday, February 20, 9:00 am

| Sheet A | 1 | 2 | 3 | 4 | 5 | 6 | 7 | 8 | 9 | 10 | Final |
|---|---|---|---|---|---|---|---|---|---|---|---|
| Manitoba (Young) 🔨 | 2 | 1 | 0 | 1 | 0 | 0 | 1 | 0 | 0 | 1 | 6 |
| New Brunswick (Floyd) | 0 | 0 | 1 | 0 | 2 | 1 | 0 | 1 | 0 | 0 | 5 |

| Sheet B | 1 | 2 | 3 | 4 | 5 | 6 | 7 | 8 | 9 | 10 | Final |
|---|---|---|---|---|---|---|---|---|---|---|---|
| Ontario (Middaugh) 🔨 | 0 | 3 | 0 | 1 | 0 | 1 | 0 | 0 | 0 | 1 | 6 |
| Prince Edward Island (Bradley) | 1 | 0 | 1 | 0 | 1 | 0 | 1 | 0 | 0 | 0 | 4 |

| Sheet C | 1 | 2 | 3 | 4 | 5 | 6 | 7 | 8 | 9 | 10 | 11 | Final |
|---|---|---|---|---|---|---|---|---|---|---|---|---|
| Saskatchewan (Ridgway) 🔨 | 0 | 1 | 0 | 2 | 1 | 0 | 1 | 0 | 0 | 1 | 1 | 7 |
| Quebec (Larouche) | 0 | 0 | 3 | 0 | 0 | 1 | 0 | 2 | 0 | 0 | 0 | 6 |

| Sheet D | 1 | 2 | 3 | 4 | 5 | 6 | 7 | 8 | 9 | 10 | Final |
|---|---|---|---|---|---|---|---|---|---|---|---|
| Nova Scotia (Jones) 🔨 | 1 | 0 | 1 | 0 | 0 | 1 | 0 | 0 | 0 | 0 | 3 |
| Newfoundland (Strong) | 0 | 1 | 0 | 1 | 0 | 0 | 2 | 0 | 0 | 1 | 5 |

=== Draw 10 ===
Tuesday, February 20, 1:30 pm

| Sheet A | 1 | 2 | 3 | 4 | 5 | 6 | 7 | 8 | 9 | 10 | 11 | Final |
|---|---|---|---|---|---|---|---|---|---|---|---|---|
| Prince Edward Island (Bradley) 🔨 | 0 | 0 | 1 | 1 | 0 | 0 | 0 | 2 | 0 | 1 | 2 | 7 |
| Northwest Territories/Yukon (Koe) | 0 | 0 | 0 | 0 | 1 | 2 | 1 | 0 | 1 | 0 | 0 | 5 |

| Sheet B | 1 | 2 | 3 | 4 | 5 | 6 | 7 | 8 | 9 | 10 | Final |
|---|---|---|---|---|---|---|---|---|---|---|---|
| New Brunswick (Floyd) 🔨 | 2 | 0 | 1 | 0 | 1 | 0 | 1 | 0 | 0 | 1 | 6 |
| Alberta (Sonnenberg) | 0 | 1 | 0 | 2 | 0 | 1 | 0 | 2 | 1 | 0 | 7 |

| Sheet C | 1 | 2 | 3 | 4 | 5 | 6 | 7 | 8 | 9 | 10 | Final |
|---|---|---|---|---|---|---|---|---|---|---|---|
| Newfoundland (Strong) 🔨 | 0 | 2 | 1 | 0 | 0 | 3 | 2 | 0 | X | X | 8 |
| British Columbia (MacDonald) | 0 | 0 | 0 | 0 | 1 | 0 | 0 | 1 | X | X | 2 |

| Sheet D | 1 | 2 | 3 | 4 | 5 | 6 | 7 | 8 | 9 | 10 | Final |
|---|---|---|---|---|---|---|---|---|---|---|---|
| Quebec (Larouche) 🔨 | 0 | 1 | 1 | 1 | 1 | 0 | 0 | 1 | 0 | 1 | 6 |
| Canada (Law) | 0 | 0 | 0 | 0 | 0 | 2 | 0 | 0 | 2 | 0 | 4 |

=== Draw 11 ===
Tuesday, February 20, 7:30 pm

| Sheet A | 1 | 2 | 3 | 4 | 5 | 6 | 7 | 8 | 9 | 10 | Final |
|---|---|---|---|---|---|---|---|---|---|---|---|
| Alberta (Sonnenberg) 🔨 | 0 | 0 | 1 | 0 | 1 | 0 | 1 | 0 | X | X | 3 |
| Ontario (Middaugh) | 0 | 1 | 0 | 2 | 0 | 2 | 0 | 3 | X | X | 8 |

| Sheet B | 1 | 2 | 3 | 4 | 5 | 6 | 7 | 8 | 9 | 10 | Final |
|---|---|---|---|---|---|---|---|---|---|---|---|
| Northwest Territories/Yukon (Koe) 🔨 | 1 | 0 | 0 | 1 | 3 | 2 | 0 | 0 | 1 | X | 8 |
| Manitoba (Young) | 0 | 2 | 0 | 0 | 0 | 0 | 1 | 2 | 0 | X | 5 |

| Sheet C | 1 | 2 | 3 | 4 | 5 | 6 | 7 | 8 | 9 | 10 | 11 | Final |
|---|---|---|---|---|---|---|---|---|---|---|---|---|
| Canada (Law) 🔨 | 1 | 0 | 0 | 0 | 0 | 1 | 0 | 2 | 0 | 3 | 1 | 8 |
| Nova Scotia (Jones) | 0 | 0 | 2 | 1 | 2 | 0 | 1 | 0 | 1 | 0 | 0 | 7 |

| Sheet D | 1 | 2 | 3 | 4 | 5 | 6 | 7 | 8 | 9 | 10 | Final |
|---|---|---|---|---|---|---|---|---|---|---|---|
| British Columbia (MacDonald) 🔨 | 0 | 1 | 1 | 1 | 1 | 0 | 5 | 0 | 1 | X | 10 |
| Saskatchewan (Ridgway) | 0 | 0 | 0 | 0 | 0 | 3 | 0 | 1 | 0 | X | 4 |

=== Draw 12 ===
Wednesday, February 21, 9:00 am

| Sheet A | 1 | 2 | 3 | 4 | 5 | 6 | 7 | 8 | 9 | 10 | Final |
|---|---|---|---|---|---|---|---|---|---|---|---|
| Saskatchewan (Ridgway) 🔨 | 0 | 1 | 1 | 0 | 1 | 0 | 0 | 0 | 0 | X | 3 |
| Nova Scotia (Jones) | 0 | 0 | 0 | 2 | 0 | 1 | 1 | 2 | 2 | X | 8 |

| Sheet B | 1 | 2 | 3 | 4 | 5 | 6 | 7 | 8 | 9 | 10 | Final |
|---|---|---|---|---|---|---|---|---|---|---|---|
| Quebec (Larouche) 🔨 | 1 | 0 | 0 | 0 | 2 | 0 | 2 | 2 | 0 | X | 7 |
| Newfoundland (Strong) | 0 | 0 | 1 | 0 | 0 | 1 | 0 | 0 | 1 | X | 3 |

| Sheet C | 1 | 2 | 3 | 4 | 5 | 6 | 7 | 8 | 9 | 10 | Final |
|---|---|---|---|---|---|---|---|---|---|---|---|
| New Brunswick (Floyd) 🔨 | 2 | 0 | 1 | 0 | 2 | 0 | 0 | 3 | 0 | X | 8 |
| Prince Edward Island (Bradley) | 0 | 1 | 0 | 1 | 0 | 1 | 0 | 0 | 1 | X | 4 |

| Sheet D | 1 | 2 | 3 | 4 | 5 | 6 | 7 | 8 | 9 | 10 | 11 | Final |
|---|---|---|---|---|---|---|---|---|---|---|---|---|
| Alberta (Sonnenberg) 🔨 | 0 | 0 | 2 | 2 | 0 | 2 | 0 | 1 | 0 | 0 | 2 | 9 |
| Northwest Territories/Yukon (Koe) | 0 | 1 | 0 | 0 | 2 | 0 | 1 | 0 | 2 | 1 | 0 | 7 |

=== Draw 13 ===
Wednesday, February 21, 1:30 pm

| Sheet A | 1 | 2 | 3 | 4 | 5 | 6 | 7 | 8 | 9 | 10 | Final |
|---|---|---|---|---|---|---|---|---|---|---|---|
| Newfoundland (Strong) 🔨 | 0 | 0 | 0 | 1 | 0 | 0 | 2 | 0 | 1 | 1 | 5 |
| Canada (Law) | 0 | 0 | 0 | 0 | 2 | 0 | 0 | 1 | 0 | 0 | 3 |

| Sheet B | 1 | 2 | 3 | 4 | 5 | 6 | 7 | 8 | 9 | 10 | 11 | Final |
|---|---|---|---|---|---|---|---|---|---|---|---|---|
| Nova Scotia (Jones) 🔨 | 0 | 0 | 0 | 2 | 0 | 0 | 1 | 0 | 3 | 0 | 2 | 8 |
| British Columbia (MacDonald) | 0 | 0 | 1 | 0 | 1 | 1 | 0 | 1 | 0 | 2 | 0 | 6 |

| Sheet C | 1 | 2 | 3 | 4 | 5 | 6 | 7 | 8 | 9 | 10 | Final |
|---|---|---|---|---|---|---|---|---|---|---|---|
| Northwest Territories/Yukon (Koe) 🔨 | 1 | 0 | 1 | 0 | 0 | 2 | 0 | 0 | 2 | 0 | 6 |
| Ontario (Middaugh) | 0 | 1 | 0 | 3 | 1 | 0 | 1 | 1 | 0 | 1 | 8 |

| Sheet D | 1 | 2 | 3 | 4 | 5 | 6 | 7 | 8 | 9 | 10 | Final |
|---|---|---|---|---|---|---|---|---|---|---|---|
| Prince Edward Island (Bradley) 🔨 | 1 | 0 | 0 | 1 | 2 | 1 | 0 | 2 | 0 | 0 | 7 |
| Manitoba (Young) | 0 | 1 | 2 | 0 | 0 | 0 | 1 | 0 | 3 | 1 | 8 |

=== Draw 14 ===
Wednesday, February 21, 7:30 pm

| Sheet A | 1 | 2 | 3 | 4 | 5 | 6 | 7 | 8 | 9 | 10 | Final |
|---|---|---|---|---|---|---|---|---|---|---|---|
| British Columbia (MacDonald) 🔨 | 0 | 1 | 0 | 0 | 2 | 0 | 2 | 1 | 0 | 0 | 6 |
| Quebec (Larouche) | 0 | 0 | 1 | 2 | 0 | 2 | 0 | 0 | 2 | 1 | 8 |

| Sheet B | 1 | 2 | 3 | 4 | 5 | 6 | 7 | 8 | 9 | 10 | Final |
|---|---|---|---|---|---|---|---|---|---|---|---|
| Canada (Law) 🔨 | 0 | 2 | 0 | 1 | 0 | 0 | 2 | 0 | 4 | X | 9 |
| Saskatchewan (Ridgway) | 0 | 0 | 2 | 0 | 0 | 1 | 0 | 1 | 0 | X | 4 |

| Sheet C | 1 | 2 | 3 | 4 | 5 | 6 | 7 | 8 | 9 | 10 | Final |
|---|---|---|---|---|---|---|---|---|---|---|---|
| Manitoba (Young) 🔨 | 0 | 1 | 0 | 2 | 0 | 0 | 1 | 0 | 0 | 2 | 6 |
| Alberta (Sonnenberg) | 0 | 0 | 1 | 0 | 0 | 1 | 0 | 0 | 2 | 0 | 4 |

| Sheet D | 1 | 2 | 3 | 4 | 5 | 6 | 7 | 8 | 9 | 10 | Final |
|---|---|---|---|---|---|---|---|---|---|---|---|
| Ontario (Middaugh) 🔨 | 2 | 0 | 0 | 0 | 1 | 1 | 0 | 1 | 0 | 2 | 7 |
| New Brunswick (Floyd) | 0 | 2 | 1 | 2 | 0 | 0 | 1 | 0 | 0 | 0 | 6 |

=== Draw 15 ===
Thursday, February 22, 9:00 am

| Sheet A | 1 | 2 | 3 | 4 | 5 | 6 | 7 | 8 | 9 | 10 | Final |
|---|---|---|---|---|---|---|---|---|---|---|---|
| New Brunswick (Floyd) 🔨 | 2 | 0 | 1 | 0 | 1 | 1 | 0 | 2 | 0 | 0 | 7 |
| Newfoundland (Strong) | 0 | 1 | 0 | 2 | 0 | 0 | 1 | 0 | 2 | 0 | 6 |

| Sheet B | 1 | 2 | 3 | 4 | 5 | 6 | 7 | 8 | 9 | 10 | Final |
|---|---|---|---|---|---|---|---|---|---|---|---|
| Alberta (Sonnenberg) 🔨 | 2 | 0 | 1 | 0 | 2 | 0 | 2 | 0 | 0 | 1 | 8 |
| British Columbia (MacDonald) | 0 | 1 | 0 | 3 | 0 | 1 | 0 | 2 | 0 | 0 | 7 |

| Sheet C | 1 | 2 | 3 | 4 | 5 | 6 | 7 | 8 | 9 | 10 | Final |
|---|---|---|---|---|---|---|---|---|---|---|---|
| Nova Scotia (Jones) 🔨 | 2 | 0 | 0 | 3 | 0 | 2 | 0 | 1 | 0 | 1 | 9 |
| Northwest Territories/Yukon (Koe) | 0 | 1 | 1 | 0 | 2 | 0 | 2 | 0 | 1 | 0 | 7 |

| Sheet D | 1 | 2 | 3 | 4 | 5 | 6 | 7 | 8 | 9 | 10 | 11 | Final |
|---|---|---|---|---|---|---|---|---|---|---|---|---|
| Canada (Law) 🔨 | 0 | 0 | 3 | 0 | 0 | 1 | 0 | 3 | 0 | 1 | 1 | 9 |
| Manitoba (Young) | 0 | 2 | 0 | 1 | 1 | 0 | 2 | 0 | 2 | 0 | 0 | 8 |

=== Draw 16 ===
Thursday, February 22, 1:30 pm

| Sheet A | 1 | 2 | 3 | 4 | 5 | 6 | 7 | 8 | 9 | 10 | Final |
|---|---|---|---|---|---|---|---|---|---|---|---|
| Northwest Territories/Yukon (Koe) 🔨 | 2 | 0 | 1 | 0 | 0 | 0 | 0 | 0 | X | X | 3 |
| Canada (Law) | 0 | 2 | 0 | 1 | 2 | 1 | 2 | 1 | X | X | 9 |

| Sheet B | 1 | 2 | 3 | 4 | 5 | 6 | 7 | 8 | 9 | 10 | 11 | Final |
|---|---|---|---|---|---|---|---|---|---|---|---|---|
| Manitoba (Young) 🔨 | 0 | 0 | 0 | 1 | 0 | 4 | 0 | 1 | 0 | 0 | 0 | 6 |
| Nova Scotia (Jones) | 1 | 0 | 0 | 0 | 2 | 0 | 1 | 0 | 1 | 1 | 1 | 7 |

| Sheet C | 1 | 2 | 3 | 4 | 5 | 6 | 7 | 8 | 9 | 10 | Final |
|---|---|---|---|---|---|---|---|---|---|---|---|
| Quebec (Larouche) 🔨 | 1 | 0 | 0 | 2 | 0 | 1 | 1 | 0 | 0 | 2 | 7 |
| Ontario (Middaugh) | 0 | 0 | 0 | 0 | 1 | 0 | 0 | 2 | 1 | 0 | 4 |

| Sheet D | 1 | 2 | 3 | 4 | 5 | 6 | 7 | 8 | 9 | 10 | Final |
|---|---|---|---|---|---|---|---|---|---|---|---|
| Saskatchewan (Ridgway) 🔨 | 0 | 1 | 0 | 0 | 1 | 0 | 0 | 0 | 0 | X | 2 |
| Prince Edward Island (Bradley) | 0 | 0 | 1 | 0 | 0 | 1 | 1 | 1 | 3 | X | 7 |

=== Draw 17 ===
Thursday, February 22, 7:30 pm

| Sheet A | 1 | 2 | 3 | 4 | 5 | 6 | 7 | 8 | 9 | 10 | Final |
|---|---|---|---|---|---|---|---|---|---|---|---|
| Ontario (Middaugh) 🔨 | 2 | 0 | 1 | 1 | 1 | 0 | 0 | 1 | 5 | X | 11 |
| Saskatchewan (Ridgway) | 0 | 1 | 0 | 0 | 0 | 0 | 1 | 0 | 0 | X | 2 |

| Sheet B | 1 | 2 | 3 | 4 | 5 | 6 | 7 | 8 | 9 | 10 | Final |
|---|---|---|---|---|---|---|---|---|---|---|---|
| Prince Edward Island (Bradley) 🔨 | 0 | 1 | 2 | 1 | 0 | 0 | 0 | 0 | 0 | X | 4 |
| Quebec (Larouche) | 0 | 0 | 0 | 0 | 0 | 1 | 2 | 1 | 2 | X | 6 |

| Sheet C | 1 | 2 | 3 | 4 | 5 | 6 | 7 | 8 | 9 | 10 | Final |
|---|---|---|---|---|---|---|---|---|---|---|---|
| British Columbia (MacDonald) 🔨 | 1 | 2 | 0 | 0 | 0 | 1 | 0 | 1 | 0 | 2 | 7 |
| New Brunswick (Floyd) | 0 | 0 | 0 | 1 | 1 | 0 | 1 | 0 | 3 | 0 | 6 |

| Sheet D | 1 | 2 | 3 | 4 | 5 | 6 | 7 | 8 | 9 | 10 | Final |
|---|---|---|---|---|---|---|---|---|---|---|---|
| Newfoundland (Strong) 🔨 | 1 | 0 | 0 | 2 | 0 | 2 | 0 | 0 | 0 | 0 | 5 |
| Alberta (Sonnenberg) | 0 | 1 | 0 | 0 | 3 | 0 | 1 | 0 | 1 | 1 | 7 |

== Tiebreaker ==
Friday, February 23, 9:00 am

| Sheet B | 1 | 2 | 3 | 4 | 5 | 6 | 7 | 8 | 9 | 10 | Final |
|---|---|---|---|---|---|---|---|---|---|---|---|
| Prince Edward Island (Bradley) | 0 | 0 | 1 | 0 | 1 | 0 | X | X | X | X | 2 |
| Ontario (Middaugh) 🔨 | 2 | 2 | 0 | 2 | 0 | 3 | X | X | X | X | 9 |

Player percentages
| Prince Edward Island | | Ontario | |
|---|---|---|---|
| Tricia MacGregor | 88% | Sheri Cordina | 94% |
| Leslie Allan | 67% | Andrea Lawes | 81% |
| Janice MacCallum | 67% | Janet Brown | 92% |
| Shelly Bradley | 52% | Sherry Middaugh | 73% |
| Total | 68% | Total | 85% |

== Playoffs ==
Page playoff system
1 | Canada | 4
2 | Nova Scotia | 7
3 | Quebec | 6
4 | Ontario | 7

Semifinal
1 | Canada | 7
4 | Ontario | 6

Final
2 | Nova Scotia | 7
1 | Canada | 6

=== 1 vs. 2 ===
Friday, February 23, 1:30 pm

| Sheet C | 1 | 2 | 3 | 4 | 5 | 6 | 7 | 8 | 9 | 10 | Final |
|---|---|---|---|---|---|---|---|---|---|---|---|
| Canada (Law) 🔨 | 0 | 1 | 0 | 0 | 2 | 0 | 0 | 0 | 1 | 0 | 4 |
| Nova Scotia (Jones) | 0 | 0 | 2 | 0 | 0 | 0 | 2 | 1 | 0 | 2 | 7 |

Player percentages
| Canada | | Nova Scotia | |
|---|---|---|---|
| Diane Nelson | 86% | Nancy Delahunt | 84% |
| Georgina Wheatcroft | 86% | Mary-Anne Waye | 85% |
| Julie Skinner | 84% | Kim Kelly | 69% |
| Kelley Law | 61% | Colleen Jones | 88% |
| Total | 79% | Total | 81% |

=== 3 vs. 4 ===
Friday, February 23, 7:30 pm

| Sheet C | 1 | 2 | 3 | 4 | 5 | 6 | 7 | 8 | 9 | 10 | Final |
|---|---|---|---|---|---|---|---|---|---|---|---|
| Quebec (Larouche) 🔨 | 0 | 1 | 0 | 2 | 0 | 1 | 0 | 1 | 0 | 1 | 6 |
| Ontario (Middaugh) | 1 | 0 | 2 | 0 | 1 | 0 | 1 | 0 | 2 | 0 | 7 |

Player percentages
| Quebec | | Ontario | |
|---|---|---|---|
| Valerie Grenier | 81% | Sheri Cordina | 94% |
| Annie Lemay | 73% | Andrea Lawes | 83% |
| Nancy Belanger | 74% | Janet Brown | 85% |
| Marie-France Larouche | 86% | Sherry Middaugh | 84% |
| Total | 78% | Total | 86% |

=== Semifinal ===
Saturday, February 24, 7:30 pm

| Sheet B | 1 | 2 | 3 | 4 | 5 | 6 | 7 | 8 | 9 | 10 | Final |
|---|---|---|---|---|---|---|---|---|---|---|---|
| Canada (Law) 🔨 | 0 | 2 | 0 | 2 | 0 | 1 | 2 | 0 | 0 | 0 | 7 |
| Ontario (Middaugh) | 0 | 0 | 1 | 0 | 1 | 0 | 0 | 2 | 1 | 1 | 6 |

Player percentages
| Canada | | Ontario | |
|---|---|---|---|
| Diane Nelson | 92% | Sheri Cordina | 98% |
| Georgina Wheatcroft | 95% | Andrea Lawes | 81% |
| Julie Skinner | 75% | Janet Brown | 73% |
| Kelley Law | 85% | Sherry Middaugh | 79% |
| Total | 87% | Total | 83% |

=== Final ===
Sunday, February 25, 1:30 pm

| Sheet B | 1 | 2 | 3 | 4 | 5 | 6 | 7 | 8 | 9 | 10 | 11 | Final |
|---|---|---|---|---|---|---|---|---|---|---|---|---|
| Canada (Law) 🔨 | 0 | 1 | 1 | 0 | 1 | 0 | 2 | 0 | 0 | 1 | 0 | 6 |
| Nova Scotia (Jones) | 0 | 0 | 0 | 1 | 0 | 1 | 0 | 3 | 1 | 0 | 1 | 7 |

Player percentages
| Canada | | Nova Scotia | |
|---|---|---|---|
| Diane Nelson | 81% | Nancy Delahunt | 85% |
| Georgina Wheatcroft | 67% | Mary-Anne Waye | 83% |
| Julie Skinner | 89% | Kim Kelly | 74% |
| Kelley Law | 78% | Colleen Jones | 77% |
| Total | 78% | Total | 80% |

== Statistics ==
=== Top 5 Player Percentages ===
Round robin only; minimum 6 games

Key
| First All-Star Team |
| Second All-Star Team |

| Leads | % |
|---|---|
| (Alberta) Karen McNamee | 86 |
| (Nova Scotia) Nancy Delahunt | 84 |
| (Ontario) Sheri Cordina | 84 |
| (Newfoundland and Labrador) Michelle Baker | 84 |
| (Canada) Diane Nelson | 84 |

| Seconds | % |
|---|---|
| (Canada) Georgina Wheatcroft | 84 |
| (Nova Scotia) Mary-Anne Waye | 81 |
| (British Columbia) Adina Tasaka | 80 |
| (Quebec) Annie Lemay | 80 |
| (Saskatchewan) Roberta Materi | 77 |

| Thirds | % |
|---|---|
| (Nova Scotia) Kim Kelly | 84 |
| (Alberta) Marcy Balderston | 80 |
| (British Columbia) Lisa Whitaker (Note: Whitaker's percentage includes the one game where she threw skip stones.) | 79 |
| (Canada) Julie Skinner | 79 |
| (Manitoba) Janice Sandison | 79 |

| Skips | % |
|---|---|
| (Canada) Kelley Law | 79 |
| (Quebec) Marie-France Larouche | 78 |
| (Newfoundland and Labrador) Heather Strong | 77 |
| (Ontario) Sherry Middaugh | 76 |
| (Prince Edward Island) Shelly Bradley | 75 |
| (Nova Scotia) Colleen Jones | 75 |

| Alternates | % |
|---|---|
| (Prince Edward Island) Nancy Cameron (Note: Cameron played four games at third and two games at second.) | 79 |

== Awards ==
=== All-Star teams ===
First Team
| Position | Name | Team |
|---|---|---|
| Skip | Marie-France Larouche | Quebec |
| Third | Kim Kelly (3) | Nova Scotia |
| Second | Georgina Wheatcroft (2) | Canada |
| Lead | Sheri Cordina | Ontario |

Second Team
| Position | Name | Team |
|---|---|---|
| Skip | Kelley Law | Canada |
| Third | Lisa Whitaker | British Columbia |
| Second | Roberta Materi | Saskatchewan |
| Lead | Karen McNamee | Alberta |

=== Marj Mitchell Sportsmanship Award ===
The Marj Mitchell Sportsmanship Award was presented to the player chosen by their fellow peers as the curler that most exemplified sportsmanship and dedication to curling during the annual Scotties Tournament of Hearts.

| Name | Position | Team |
|---|---|---|
| Jane Arseneau (2) | Lead | New Brunswick |

=== Sandra Schmirler Most Valuable Player Award ===
The Sandra Schmirler Most Valuable Player Award was awarded to the top player in the playoff round by members of the media in the Scotties Tournament of Hearts.

Beginning this year, the award was renamed in honour of the great Saskatchewan skip Sandra Schmirler, who died on March 2, 2000, after losing her battle with cancer at the age of 36. Schmirler won three Scotties and a gold medal at the 1998 Winter Olympics in Nagano, Japan.

| Name | Position | Team |
|---|---|---|
| Nancy Delahunt | Lead | Nova Scotia |

=== Joan Mead Builder Award ===
Beginning this year, the Joan Mead Builder Award would be presented to a builder in the sport of curling named in the honour of the late CBC curling producer Joan Mead, who died the year prior.

| Name | Contribution(s) |
|---|---|
| Lloyd Stansell | Ice maker |

=== Ford Hot Shots ===
The Ford Hot Shots was a skills competition preceding the round robin of the tournament. Each competitor had to perform a series of shots with each shot scoring between 0 and 5 points depending on where the stone came to rest. The winner of this edition of the event would win a two-year lease on a Ford Taurus SE.

| Winner | Runner-Up | Score |
|---|---|---|
| (Canada) Kelley Law | (Canada) Georgina Wheatcroft | 14–12 |

=== Shot of the Week Award ===
The Shot of the Week Award was awarded to the curler who had been determined with the most outstanding shot during the tournament as voted on by TSN commentators.

| Name | Position | Team |
|---|---|---|
| Marie-France Larouche | Skip | Quebec |
