= 2004 Scott Tournament of Hearts =

- Host city: Red Deer, Alberta
- Arena: ENMAX Centrium
- Dates: February 21–29
- Attendance: 112,886
- Winner: Canada
- Curling club: Mayflower CC, Halifax
- Skip: Colleen Jones
- Third: Kim Kelly
- Second: Mary-Anne Arsenault
- Lead: Nancy Delahunt
- Alternate: Mary Sue Radford
- Coach: Ken Bagnell
- Finalist: Quebec (Marie-France Larouche)

The 2004 Scott Tournament of Hearts was held at the ENMAX Centrium in Red Deer, Alberta from February 21 to 29 2004. The Colleen Jones rink returned as Team Canada, going on to win their fourth straight Hearts, then representing Canada at the 2004 World Women's Curling Championship where they won gold.

== Teams ==
The teams were listed as follows:

Team Canada	Alberta	British Columbia
Mayflower CC, Halifax Skip: Colleen Jones; Third: Kim Kelly; Second: Mary-Anne Arsenault; Lead: Nancy Delahunt; Alternate: Mary Sue Radford	Calgary WC, Calgary Skip: Shannon Kleibrink; Third: Amy Nixon; Second: Glenys Bakker; Lead: Stephanie Marchand; Alternate: Debby Pendergast	Royal City CC, New Westminster Skip: Georgina Wheatcroft; Third: Diane McLean; Second: Shellan Reed (Note: Team British Columbia alternate Julie Skinner threw second stones in Draw 15.); Lead: Diane Dezura; Alternate: Julie Skinner
Manitoba	New Brunswick	Newfoundland and Labrador
Wheat City CC, Brandon Skip: Lois Fowler; Third: Gerri Cooke; Second: Maureen Bonar; Lead: Lana Hunter; Alternate: Allyson Stewart	Thistle St. Andrews CC, Saint John Skip: Heidi Hanlon; Third: Sheri Stewart; Second: Jennifer Gogan (Note: Team New Brunswick alternate Susan Dobson threw lead stones in Draws 4 and 5 and second stones in Draw 12.); Lead: Judy Blanchard; Alternate: Susan Dobson	St. John's CC, St. John's Skip: Cathy Cunningham; Third: Peg Goss; Second: Kathy Kerr; Lead: Heather Martin; Alternate: Maria Thomas-French
Nova Scotia	Ontario	Prince Edward Island
Mayflower CC, Halifax Fourth: Meredith Doyle; Skip: Heather Smith-Dacey; Second: Laine Peters; Lead: Beth Iskiw; Alternate: Nancy MacDonald	Coldwater CC, Coldwater Skip: Sherry Middaugh; Third: Kirsten Wall; Second: Andrea Lawes; Lead: Sheri Cordina; Alternate: Jenn Hanna	Charlottetown CC, Charlottetown Skip: Suzanne Gaudet; Third: Susan McInnis; Second: Janice MacCallum; Lead: Tricia Affleck; Alternate: Nancy Cameron
Quebec	Saskatchewan	Northwest Territories/Yukon
CC Etchemin, Saint-Romuald Skip: Marie-France Larouche; Third: Karo Gagnon; Second: Annie Lemay; Lead: Véronique Grégoire; Alternate: Nancy Bélanger	Delisle CC, Delisle Skip: Sherry Anderson; Third: Kim Hodson; Second: Sandra Mulroney; Lead: Donna Gignac; Alternate: Heather Walsh	Yellowknife CC, Yellowknife Skip: Stacey Stabel; Third: Lisa Freeman; Second: Alana Fisher; Lead: Debbie Moss; Alternate: Wendy Ondrack

== Map of teams ==
Team Canada Provincial Winners

== Round robin standings ==
Final round robin standings

Key
Teams to Playoffs
Teams to Tiebreaker

Locale	Skip	W	L	W–L	PF	PA	EW	EL	BE	SE	S%
Canada	Colleen Jones	9	2	–	89	59	57	38	7	20	82%
Ontario	Sherry Middaugh	8	3	1–0	84	52	51	37	11	16	79%
Quebec	Marie-France Larouche	8	3	0–1	73	70	44	46	10	11	75%
Manitoba	Lois Fowler	7	4	1–0	78	73	44	45	16	9	80%
Saskatchewan	Sherry Anderson	7	4	0–1	77	52	45	37	15	16	80%
Alberta	Shannon Kleibrink	6	5	2–0	63	66	40	43	8	8	79%
Newfoundland and Labrador	Cathy Cunningham	6	5	1–1	79	71	48	43	8	14	78%
Nova Scotia	Heather Smith-Dacey	6	5	0–2	69	68	43	46	18	11	76%
British Columbia	Georgina Wheatcroft	4	7	–	69	74	49	47	5	15	78%
New Brunswick	Heidi Hanlon	2	9	1–0	58	82	40	55	5	6	71%
Prince Edward Island	Suzanne Gaudet	2	9	0–1	59	82	38	43	9	7	76%
Northwest Territories/Yukon	Stacey Stabel	1	10	–	49	91	34	55	9	3	71%

== Round Robin results ==
All draw times are listed in Mountain Time (UTC−07:00).

=== Draw 1 ===
Saturday, February 21, 2:00 pm

Sheet A	1	2	3	4	5	6	7	8	9	10	Final
Canada (Jones) 🔨	0	1	0	3	0	2	1	0	0	1	8
Newfoundland and Labrador (Cunningham)	0	0	0	0	2	0	0	2	1	0	5

Sheet B	1	2	3	4	5	6	7	8	9	10	Final
Saskatchewan (Anderson) 🔨	0	0	0	0	1	0	0	0	3	0	4
Manitoba (Fowler)	0	0	0	0	0	2	0	1	0	3	6

Sheet C	1	2	3	4	5	6	7	8	9	10	Final
Northwest Territories/Yukon (Stabel)	0	0	0	1	0	0	1	0	2	0	4
Nova Scotia (Smith-Dacey) 🔨	1	0	1	0	0	2	0	2	0	1	7

Sheet D	1	2	3	4	5	6	7	8	9	10	Final
Alberta (Kleibrink)	3	0	3	0	0	0	3	0	2	X	11
Prince Edward Island (Gaudet)	0	1	0	1	2	0	0	2	0	X	6

=== Draw 2 ===
Saturday, February 21, 6:30 pm

Sheet A	1	2	3	4	5	6	7	8	9	10	Final
Nova Scotia (Smith-Dacey) 🔨	0	0	0	2	0	0	2	2	1	X	7
Saskatchewan (Anderson)	0	1	0	0	2	1	0	0	0	X	4

Sheet B	1	2	3	4	5	6	7	8	9	10	Final
British Columbia (Wheatcroft)	0	0	1	0	2	0	1	0	1	X	5
Quebec (Larouche) 🔨	1	1	0	1	0	1	0	2	0	X	6

Sheet C	1	2	3	4	5	6	7	8	9	10	Final
New Brunswick (Hanlon)	0	0	1	0	0	0	1	0	0	X	2
Ontario (Middaugh) 🔨	0	1	0	1	1	3	0	1	1	X	8

Sheet D	1	2	3	4	5	6	7	8	9	10	Final
Northwest Territories/Yukon (Stabel) 🔨	0	0	1	0	0	1	0	0	1	X	3
Manitoba (Fowler)	0	1	0	2	0	0	3	2	0	X	8

=== Draw 3 ===
Sunday, February 22, 8:30 am

Sheet B	1	2	3	4	5	6	7	8	9	10	Final
Prince Edward Island (Gaudet) 🔨	1	0	0	0	1	0	X	X	X	X	2
Canada (Jones)	0	4	3	2	0	1	X	X	X	X	10

Sheet C	1	2	3	4	5	6	7	8	9	10	Final
Alberta (Kleibrink) 🔨	1	0	1	0	1	0	0	3	0	1	7
Newfoundland and Labrador (Cunningham)	0	2	0	1	0	1	1	0	1	0	6

=== Draw 4 ===
Sunday, February 22, 1:00 pm

Sheet A	1	2	3	4	5	6	7	8	9	10	Final
Quebec (Larouche) 🔨	1	0	2	0	0	1	1	1	0	1	7
New Brunswick (Hanlon)	0	1	0	1	3	0	0	0	1	0	6

Sheet B	1	2	3	4	5	6	7	8	9	10	Final
Manitoba (Fowler) 🔨	0	1	0	0	1	0	2	0	1	0	5
Nova Scotia (Smith-Dacey)	0	0	2	2	0	2	0	1	0	1	8

Sheet C	1	2	3	4	5	6	7	8	9	10	Final
Saskatchewan (Anderson) 🔨	1	0	2	1	2	2	X	X	X	X	8
Northwest Territories/Yukon (Stabel)	0	0	0	0	0	0	X	X	X	X	0

Sheet D	1	2	3	4	5	6	7	8	9	10	Final
British Columbia (Wheatcroft) 🔨	1	0	0	2	0	1	0	1	0	X	5
Ontario (Middaugh)	0	2	1	0	3	0	1	0	2	X	9

=== Draw 5 ===
Sunday, February 22, 6:00 pm

Sheet A	1	2	3	4	5	6	7	8	9	10	Final
Newfoundland and Labrador (Cunningham) 🔨	0	2	0	0	1	0	1	0	X	X	4
Prince Edward Island (Gaudet)	0	0	2	3	0	1	0	4	X	X	10

Sheet B	1	2	3	4	5	6	7	8	9	10	Final
New Brunswick (Hanlon) 🔨	1	0	0	0	0	0	1	0	0	X	2
British Columbia (Wheatcroft)	0	1	0	1	2	1	0	1	1	X	7

Sheet C	1	2	3	4	5	6	7	8	9	10	Final
Ontario (Middaugh) 🔨	2	1	1	1	0	2	1	X	X	X	8
Quebec (Larouche)	0	0	0	0	1	0	0	X	X	X	1

Sheet D	1	2	3	4	5	6	7	8	9	10	Final
Canada (Jones) 🔨	0	2	1	0	0	2	0	3	1	X	9
Alberta (Kleibrink)	1	0	0	2	0	0	1	0	0	X	4

=== Draw 6 ===
Monday, February 23, 8:30 am

Sheet A	1	2	3	4	5	6	7	8	9	10	Final
Alberta (Kleibrink) 🔨	3	1	2	3	0	2	X	X	X	X	11
Northwest Territories/Yukon (Stabel)	0	0	0	0	2	0	X	X	X	X	2

Sheet B	1	2	3	4	5	6	7	8	9	10	Final
Prince Edward Island (Gaudet) 🔨	0	0	1	0	2	0	X	X	X	X	3
Saskatchewan (Anderson)	0	3	0	5	0	2	X	X	X	X	10

Sheet C	1	2	3	4	5	6	7	8	9	10	Final
Canada (Jones) 🔨	0	1	1	0	0	1	0	0	1	1	5
Nova Scotia (Smith-Dacey)	0	0	0	0	2	0	2	2	0	0	6

Sheet D	1	2	3	4	5	6	7	8	9	10	Final
Newfoundland and Labrador (Cunningham) 🔨	0	2	0	3	0	2	2	0	X	X	9
Manitoba (Fowler)	0	0	2	0	1	0	0	1	X	X	4

=== Draw 7 ===
Monday, February 23, 1:00 pm

Sheet A	1	2	3	4	5	6	7	8	9	10	Final
Saskatchewan (Anderson) 🔨	0	0	2	0	2	0	1	0	1	2	8
Ontario (Middaugh)	0	0	0	1	0	1	0	2	0	0	4

Sheet B	1	2	3	4	5	6	7	8	9	10	Final
Northwest Territories/Yukon (Stabel) 🔨	1	0	1	0	0	2	0	2	0	X	6
Quebec (Larouche)	0	2	0	3	1	0	4	0	0	X	10

Sheet C	1	2	3	4	5	6	7	8	9	10	Final
Manitoba (Fowler) 🔨	1	0	1	0	1	1	0	0	X	X	4
New Brunswick (Hanlon)	0	1	0	4	0	0	4	1	X	X	10

Sheet D	1	2	3	4	5	6	7	8	9	10	Final
Nova Scotia (Smith-Dacey) 🔨	0	0	1	0	2	0	0	2	0	0	5
British Columbia (Wheatcroft)	1	0	0	1	0	3	1	0	1	1	8

=== Draw 8 ===
Monday, February 23, 6:00 pm

Sheet A	1	2	3	4	5	6	7	8	9	10	Final
British Columbia (Wheatcroft) 🔨	1	0	2	0	2	0	0	1	0	0	6
Canada (Jones)	0	1	0	1	0	1	1	0	2	2	8

Sheet B	1	2	3	4	5	6	7	8	9	10	Final
New Brunswick (Hanlon) 🔨	1	0	0	0	0	1	0	X	X	X	2
Newfoundland and Labrador (Cunningham)	0	3	2	1	2	0	3	X	X	X	11

Sheet C	1	2	3	4	5	6	7	8	9	10	Final
Quebec (Larouche) 🔨	0	2	0	1	0	1	0	0	2	2	8
Alberta (Kleibrink)	0	0	1	0	2	0	1	1	0	0	5

Sheet D	1	2	3	4	5	6	7	8	9	10	Final
Ontario (Middaugh) 🔨	0	0	2	0	2	0	0	2	0	2	8
Prince Edward Island (Gaudet)	0	1	0	2	0	0	2	0	1	0	6

=== Draw 9 ===
Tuesday, February 24, 8:30 am

Sheet A	1	2	3	4	5	6	7	8	9	10	Final
Quebec (Larouche) 🔨	1	1	0	3	0	2	0	1	0	X	8
Newfoundland and Labrador (Cunningham)	0	0	1	0	1	0	2	0	2	X	6

Sheet B	1	2	3	4	5	6	7	8	9	10	Final
Ontario (Middaugh) 🔨	0	1	1	0	4	0	1	0	0	0	7
Canada (Jones)	2	0	0	1	0	2	0	2	1	1	9

Sheet C	1	2	3	4	5	6	7	8	9	10	Final
British Columbia (Wheatcroft) 🔨	3	0	3	1	0	4	X	X	X	X	11
Prince Edward Island (Gaudet)	0	1	0	0	1	0	X	X	X	X	2

Sheet D	1	2	3	4	5	6	7	8	9	10	Final
New Brunswick (Hanlon) 🔨	1	0	1	0	2	0	0	1	1	0	6
Alberta (Kleibrink)	0	4	0	1	0	0	1	0	0	1	7

=== Draw 10 ===
Tuesday, February 24, 1:00 pm

Sheet A	1	2	3	4	5	6	7	8	9	10	Final
Prince Edward Island (Gaudet) 🔨	1	0	2	0	1	0	0	0	2	0	6
Manitoba (Fowler)	0	1	0	2	0	2	0	1	0	1	7

Sheet B	1	2	3	4	5	6	7	8	9	10	Final
Alberta (Kleibrink) 🔨	0	0	1	1	0	1	0	3	1	2	9
Nova Scotia (Smith-Dacey)	0	1	0	0	2	0	2	0	0	0	5

Sheet C	1	2	3	4	5	6	7	8	9	10	Final
Newfoundland and Labrador (Cunningham) 🔨	0	1	0	1	0	1	0	2	0	3	8
Saskatchewan (Anderson)	0	0	2	0	1	0	2	0	1	0	6

Sheet D	1	2	3	4	5	6	7	8	9	10	Final
Canada (Jones) 🔨	2	0	2	0	2	0	2	0	0	1	9
Northwest Territories/Yukon (Stabel)	0	2	0	2	0	1	0	1	1	0	7

=== Draw 11 ===
Tuesday, February 24, 6:00 pm

Sheet A	1	2	3	4	5	6	7	8	9	10	Final
Nova Scotia (Smith-Dacey) 🔨	1	0	0	3	0	0	1	1	0	2	8
New Brunswick (Hanlon)	0	0	1	0	2	2	0	0	2	0	7

Sheet B	1	2	3	4	5	6	7	8	9	10	Final
Manitoba (Fowler) 🔨	3	0	0	0	2	0	0	2	0	1	8
British Columbia (Wheatcroft)	0	2	1	1	0	0	1	0	1	0	6

Sheet C	1	2	3	4	5	6	7	8	9	10	Final
Northwest Territories/Yukon (Stabel) 🔨	1	0	0	0	1	0	2	0	0	X	4
Ontario (Middaugh)	0	0	2	0	0	2	0	2	1	X	7

Sheet D	1	2	3	4	5	6	7	8	9	10	Final
Saskatchewan (Anderson) 🔨	0	0	2	1	0	2	0	2	0	X	7
Quebec (Larouche)	1	0	0	0	1	0	2	0	1	X	5

=== Draw 12 ===
Wednesday, February 25, 8:30 am

Sheet A	1	2	3	4	5	6	7	8	9	10	Final
Northwest Territories/Yukon (Stabel) 🔨	0	2	0	1	0	0	0	0	2	0	5
British Columbia (Wheatcroft)	1	0	2	0	1	1	0	1	0	1	7

Sheet B	1	2	3	4	5	6	7	8	9	10	Final
Saskatchewan (Anderson) 🔨	0	0	2	0	1	3	0	1	2	X	9
New Brunswick (Hanlon)	0	1	0	1	0	0	2	0	0	X	4

Sheet C	1	2	3	4	5	6	7	8	9	10	Final
Nova Scotia (Smith-Dacey) 🔨	0	0	1	1	0	0	3	0	2	0	7
Quebec (Larouche)	0	0	0	0	2	1	0	3	0	2	8

Sheet D	1	2	3	4	5	6	7	8	9	10	Final
Manitoba (Fowler) 🔨	2	0	2	0	1	0	2	1	0	X	8
Ontario (Middaugh)	0	2	0	1	0	3	0	0	1	X	7

=== Draw 13 ===
Wednesday, February 25, 1:00 pm

Sheet A	1	2	3	4	5	6	7	8	9	10	Final
Ontario (Middaugh) 🔨	1	0	2	1	1	0	2	2	X	X	9
Alberta (Kleibrink)	0	1	0	0	0	0	0	0	X	X	1

Sheet B	1	2	3	4	5	6	7	8	9	10	Final
Quebec (Larouche) 🔨	2	0	0	1	2	1	0	0	0	0	6
Prince Edward Island (Gaudet)	0	1	0	0	0	0	1	1	1	1	5

Sheet C	1	2	3	4	5	6	7	8	9	10	Final
New Brunswick (Hanlon) 🔨	1	1	0	0	2	0	0	1	0	X	5
Canada (Jones)	0	0	3	2	0	1	1	0	2	X	9

Sheet D	1	2	3	4	5	6	7	8	9	10	Final
British Columbia (Wheatcroft) 🔨	2	0	0	2	0	0	0	0	X	X	4
Newfoundland and Labrador (Cunningham)	0	2	1	0	2	2	1	5	X	X	13

=== Draw 14 ===
Wednesday, February 25, 6:00 pm

Sheet A	1	2	3	4	5	6	7	8	9	10	Final
Canada (Jones) 🔨	1	0	1	1	1	0	1	0	0	1	6
Saskatchewan (Anderson)	0	2	0	0	0	1	0	1	1	0	5

Sheet B	1	2	3	4	5	6	7	8	9	10	Final
Newfoundland and Labrador (Cunningham) 🔨	0	1	0	1	1	0	0	1	2	1	7
Northwest Territories/Yukon (Stabel)	1	0	1	0	0	2	2	0	0	0	6

Sheet C	1	2	3	4	5	6	7	8	9	10	Final
Alberta (Kleibrink) 🔨	1	0	1	0	0	1	0	1	0	0	4
Manitoba (Fowler)	0	1	0	3	0	0	2	0	1	1	8

Sheet D	1	2	3	4	5	6	7	8	9	10	Final
Prince Edward Island (Gaudet) 🔨	1	0	0	3	0	0	1	0	0	X	5
Nova Scotia (Smith-Dacey)	0	2	0	0	2	0	0	2	1	X	7

=== Draw 15 ===
Thursday, February 26, 8:30 am

Sheet A	1	2	3	4	5	6	7	8	9	10	Final
Manitoba (Fowler) 🔨	0	0	0	1	0	5	0	0	2	0	8
Quebec (Larouche)	0	0	0	0	3	0	3	2	0	1	9

Sheet B	1	2	3	4	5	6	7	8	9	10	Final
Nova Scotia (Smith-Dacey) 🔨	0	1	0	0	0	2	0	1	0	X	4
Ontario (Middaugh)	0	0	1	0	1	0	1	0	4	X	7

Sheet C	1	2	3	4	5	6	7	8	9	10	Final
Saskatchewan (Anderson) 🔨	1	0	1	0	0	1	2	2	2	X	9
British Columbia (Wheatcroft)	0	1	0	2	1	0	0	0	0	X	4

Sheet D	1	2	3	4	5	6	7	8	9	10	Final
Northwest Territories/Yukon (Stabel) 🔨	2	0	2	2	0	1	0	1	0	0	8
New Brunswick (Hanlon)	0	2	0	0	1	0	1	0	2	1	7

=== Draw 16 ===
Thursday, February 26, 1:00 pm

Sheet A	1	2	3	4	5	6	7	8	9	10	Final
Newfoundland and Labrador (Cunningham) 🔨	0	2	0	0	1	1	0	0	0	3	7
Nova Scotia (Smith-Dacey)	0	0	0	2	0	0	1	1	1	0	5

Sheet B	1	2	3	4	5	6	7	8	9	10	11	Final
Canada (Jones) 🔨	0	1	1	0	1	0	3	1	0	1	0	8
Manitoba (Fowler)	0	0	0	3	0	2	0	0	3	0	1	9

Sheet C	1	2	3	4	5	6	7	8	9	10	Final
Prince Edward Island (Gaudet) 🔨	1	0	4	1	1	0	1	0	2	X	10
Northwest Territories/Yukon (Stabel)	0	1	0	0	0	1	0	2	0	X	4

Sheet D	1	2	3	4	5	6	7	8	9	10	Final
Alberta (Kleibrink) 🔨	0	1	0	1	0	1	0	0	2	X	5
Saskatchewan (Anderson)	0	0	2	0	2	0	1	2	0	X	7

=== Draw 17 ===
Thursday, February 26, 6:00 pm

Sheet A	1	2	3	4	5	6	7	8	9	10	Final
New Brunswick (Hanlon) 🔨	1	0	2	0	2	0	1	0	1	X	7
Prince Edward Island (Gaudet)	0	1	0	1	0	1	0	1	0	X	4

Sheet B	1	2	3	4	5	6	7	8	9	10	11	Final
British Columbia (Wheatcroft) 🔨	0	0	2	1	1	0	1	0	0	1	0	6
Alberta (Kleibrink)	0	1	0	0	0	2	0	2	1	0	1	7

Sheet C	1	2	3	4	5	6	7	8	9	10	Final
Ontario (Middaugh) 🔨	3	0	1	0	0	2	0	1	4	X	11
Newfoundland and Labrador (Cunningham)	0	2	0	1	0	0	1	0	0	X	4

Sheet D	1	2	3	4	5	6	7	8	9	10	Final
Quebec (Larouche) 🔨	1	0	0	0	2	0	0	X	X	X	3
Canada (Jones)	0	1	1	3	0	0	4	X	X	X	9

== Tiebreaker ==
Friday, February 27, 8:30 am

Sheet C	1	2	3	4	5	6	7	8	9	10	Final
Manitoba (Fowler) 🔨	0	0	2	1	0	2	0	4	0	1	10
Saskatchewan (Anderson)	0	2	0	0	4	0	3	0	0	0	9

Player percentages
Manitoba		Saskatchewan	
Lana Hunter	90%	Donna Gignac	82%
Maureen Bonar	83%	Sandra Mulroney	81%
Gerri Cooke	75%	Kim Hodson	85%
Lois Fowler	78%	Sherry Anderson	74%
Total	81%	Total	80%

== Playoffs ==
Page playoff system
1	Canada	9
2	Ontario	8
3	Quebec	9
4	Manitoba	4

Semifinal
2	Ontario	6
3	Quebec	7

Final
1	Canada	7
3	Quebec	4

=== 1 vs. 2 ===
Friday, February 27, 6:00 pm

Sheet C	1	2	3	4	5	6	7	8	9	10	Final
Canada (Jones) 🔨	0	2	0	3	0	1	0	2	0	1	9
Ontario (Middaugh)	0	0	4	0	3	0	1	0	0	0	8

Player percentages
Canada		Ontario	
Nancy Delahunt	99%	Sheri Cordina	80%
Mary-Anne Arsenault	85%	Andrea Lawes	71%
Kim Kelly	74%	Kirsten Wall	88%
Colleen Jones	86%	Sherry Middaugh	70%
Total	86%	Total	77%

=== 3 vs. 4 ===
Saturday, February 27, 1:00 pm

Sheet C	1	2	3	4	5	6	7	8	9	10	Final
Quebec (Larouche) 🔨	0	1	0	1	2	0	4	0	1	X	9
Manitoba (Fowler)	0	0	1	0	0	1	0	2	0	X	4

Player percentages
Quebec		Manitoba	
Véronique Grégoire	84%	Lana Hunter	85%
Annie Lemay	89%	Maureen Bonar	86%
Karo Gagnon	85%	Gerri Cooke	65%
Marie-France Larouche	85%	Lois Fowler	68%
Total	86%	Total	76%

=== Semifinal ===
Saturday, February 28, 6:00 pm

Sheet C	1	2	3	4	5	6	7	8	9	10	11	Final
Ontario (Middaugh) 🔨	0	0	2	0	2	0	1	1	0	0	0	6
Quebec (Larouche)	0	0	0	1	0	2	0	0	2	1	1	7

Player percentages
Ontario		Quebec	
Sheri Cordina	81%	Véronique Grégoire	86%
Andrea Lawes	88%	Annie Lemay	78%
Kirsten Wall	86%	Karo Gagnon	91%
Sherry Middaugh	77%	Marie-France Larouche	82%
Total	83%	Total	84%

=== Final ===
Sunday, February 29, 1:00 pm

Sheet C	1	2	3	4	5	6	7	8	9	10	Final
Canada (Jones) 🔨	0	1	1	0	2	0	1	0	2	X	7
Quebec (Larouche)	0	0	0	2	0	1	0	1	0	X	4

Player percentages
Canada		Quebec	
Nancy Delahunt	93%	Véronique Grégoire	86%
Mary-Anne Arsenault	79%	Annie Lemay	89%
Kim Kelly	85%	Karo Gagnon	79%
Colleen Jones	91%	Marie-France Larouche	79%
Total	87%	Total	83%

== Statistics ==
=== Top 5 Player Percentages ===
Round robin only; minimum 6 games

Key
First All-Star Team
Second All-Star Team

Leads	%
(Canada) Nancy Delahunt	86
(Newfoundland and Labrador) Heather Martin	85
(British Columbia) Diane Dezura	84
(Manitoba) Lana Hunter	83
(Prince Edward Island) Tricia Affleck	82

Seconds	%
(Manitoba) Maureen Bonar	84
(Canada) Mary-Anne Arsenault	82
(Alberta) Glenys Bakker	80
(Quebec) Annie Lemay	78
(Saskatchewan) Sandra Mulroney	78
(Ontario) Andrea Lawes	78

Thirds	%
(Alberta) Amy Nixon	81
(British Columbia) Diane McLean	81
(Canada) Kim Kelly	81
(Saskatchewan) Kim Hodson	81
(Ontario) Kirsten Wall	80
(Manitoba) Gerri Cooke	80

Skips	%
(Saskatchewan) Sherry Anderson	84
(Canada) Colleen Jones	80
(Newfoundland and Labrador) Cathy Cunningham	77
(Ontario) Sherry Middaugh	77
(Alberta) Shannon Kleibrink	75

=== Perfect games ===
Round robin only; minimum 10 shots thrown

Player	Team	Position	Shots	Opponent
Nancy Delahunt	Canada	Lead	12	Prince Edward Island
Lois Fowler	Manitoba	Skip	20	Alberta

== Awards ==
=== All-Star teams ===
First Team
Position	Name	Team
Skip	Colleen Jones	Canada
Third	Amy Nixon	Alberta
Second	Maureen Bonar	Manitoba
Lead	Nancy Delahunt	Canada

Second Team
Position	Name	Team
Skip	Lois Fowler	Manitoba
Third	Kim Kelly	Canada
Second	Mary-Anne Arsenault	Canada
Lead	Heather Martin	Newfoundland and Labrador

=== Marj Mitchell Sportsmanship Award ===
The Marj Mitchell Sportsmanship Award was presented to the player chosen by their fellow peers as the curler that most exemplified sportsmanship and dedication to curling during the annual Scotties Tournament of Hearts.

Name	Position	Team
Sherry Anderson	Skip	Saskatchewan

=== Sandra Schmirler Most Valuable Player Award ===
The Sandra Schmirler Most Valuable Player Award was awarded to the top player in the playoff round by members of the media in the Scotties Tournament of Hearts.

Name	Position	Team
Colleen Jones (3)	Skip	Canada

This was Jones' third straight MVP award, thus becoming the first curler to win the award three times. This would later be broken by Kerri Einarson when she won four straight MVP awards from 2020 to 2023.

=== Joan Mead Builder Award ===
The Joan Mead Builder Award recognizes a builder in the sport of curling named in the honour of the late CBC curling producer Joan Mead.

Name	Contribution(s)
Dr. Vera Pezer	Curler, coach, psychologist and author

=== Ford Hot Shots ===
The Ford Hot Shots was a skills competition preceding the round robin of the tournament. Each competitor had to perform a series of shots with each shot scoring between 0 and 5 points depending on where the stone came to rest. The winner of this edition of the event would win a two-year lease on a Ford Escape XLT FWD.

Winner	Runner-Up	Score
(Ontario) Andrea Lawes	(Alberta) Stephanie Marchand	20–13

=== Shot of the Week Award ===
The Shot of the Week Award was awarded to the curler who had been determined with the most outstanding shot during the tournament as voted on by TSN commentators.

Name	Position	Team
Lois Fowler	Skip	Manitoba
