= 2015 Canada Cup of Curling =

- Host city: Grande Prairie, Alberta
- Arena: Revolution Place
- Dates: December 2–6
- Attendance: 14,425
- Men's winner: (Alberta) Team Koe
- Curling club: Glencoe CC, Calgary
- Skip: Kevin Koe
- Third: Marc Kennedy
- Second: Brent Laing
- Lead: Ben Hebert
- Finalist: (Manitoba) Mike McEwen
- Women's winner: (Ontario) Team Homan
- Curling club: Ottawa CC, Ottawa
- Skip: Rachel Homan
- Third: Emma Miskew
- Second: Joanne Courtney
- Lead: Lisa Weagle
- Coach: Marcel Rocque
- Finalist: (Alberta) Val Sweeting

The 2015 Canada Cup of Curling was held from December 3 to 7 at Revolution Place in Grande Prairie, Alberta. This was the first time that Grande Prairie hosted the Canada Cup, and the third time that Alberta hosted the Canada Cup, which was also held in Medicine Hat in 2010 and in Camrose in 2014.

== Men ==
=== Teams ===
The teams are listed as follows: Due to a tie in CTRS points between the Reid Carruthers rink and the John Epping rink, both teams were invited to the event, expanding the field to eight teams.

Skip	Third	Second	Lead	Locale
Reid Carruthers	Braeden Moskowy	Derek Samagalski	Colin Hodgson	(Manitoba) West St. Paul CC, West St. Paul
John Epping	Mat Camm	Patrick Janssen	Tim March	(Ontario) Donalda CC, Toronto
Brad Gushue	Mark Nichols	Brett Gallant	Geoff Walker	(Newfoundland and Labrador) Bally Haly G&CC, St. John's
Steve Laycock	Kirk Muyres	Colton Flasch	Dallan Muyres	(Saskatchewan) Nutana CC, Saskatoon
Brad Jacobs	Ryan Fry	E. J. Harnden	Ryan Harnden	(Ontario) Soo CA, Sault Ste. Marie
Kevin Koe	Marc Kennedy	Brent Laing	Ben Hebert	(Alberta) Glencoe CC, Calgary
Mike McEwen	B. J. Neufeld	Matt Wozniak	Denni Neufeld	(Manitoba) Fort Rouge CC, Winnipeg
Pat Simmons	John Morris	Carter Rycroft	Nolan Thiessen	(Alberta) Glencoe CC, Calgary

=== Round-robin standings ===
Final round-robin standings

Key
Teams to Playoffs
Teams to Tiebreaker

Skip	W	L
(Manitoba) Mike McEwen	5	2
(Alberta) Kevin Koe	5	2
(Ontario) John Epping	4	3
(Alberta) Pat Simmons	4	3
(Newfoundland and Labrador) Brad Gushue	3	4
(Ontario) Brad Jacobs	3	4
(Manitoba) Reid Carruthers	2	5
(Saskatchewan) Steve Laycock	2	5

=== Round-robin results ===
All draw times listed are in Mountain Standard Time (UTC−7).

==== Draw 1 ====
Wednesday, December 2, 8:30 am

Sheet D	1	2	3	4	5	6	7	8	9	10	Final
(Manitoba) Mike McEwen	0	0	0	1	0	1	0	1	0	X	3
(Alberta) Pat Simmons	0	0	2	0	2	0	1	0	2	X	7

Sheet E	1	2	3	4	5	6	7	8	9	10	Final
(Ontario) John Epping	0	0	3	0	0	1	0	0	0	3	7
(Saskatchewan) Steve Laycock	0	1	0	0	1	0	1	1	1	0	5

==== Draw 2 ====
Wednesday, December 2, 1:30 pm

Sheet A	1	2	3	4	5	6	7	8	9	10	Final
(Alberta) Kevin Koe	0	0	2	0	2	0	1	0	3	X	8
(Newfoundland and Labrador) Brad Gushue	0	0	0	1	0	3	0	1	0	X	5

Sheet C	1	2	3	4	5	6	7	8	9	10	Final
(Saskatchewan) Steve Laycock	0	2	0	0	2	0	0	1	0	2	7
(Manitoba) Reid Carruthers	0	0	2	0	0	1	0	0	3	0	6

Sheet E	1	2	3	4	5	6	7	8	9	10	Final
(Alberta) Pat Simmons	1	1	0	1	0	0	2	0	1	0	6
(Ontario) Brad Jacobs	0	0	2	0	1	1	0	2	0	1	7

==== Draw 3 ====
Wednesday, December 2, 6:30 pm

Sheet B	1	2	3	4	5	6	7	8	9	10	Final
(Manitoba) Reid Carruthers	1	0	2	0	0	1	0	0	0	1	5
(Newfoundland and Labrador) Brad Gushue	0	2	0	1	0	0	1	0	0	0	4

Sheet C	1	2	3	4	5	6	7	8	9	10	Final
(Manitoba) Mike McEwen	0	3	2	0	1	1	1	0	0	1	9
(Ontario) John Epping	1	0	0	2	0	0	0	2	1	0	6

Sheet D	1	2	3	4	5	6	7	8	9	10	Final
(Alberta) Kevin Koe	0	0	2	0	2	2	0	1	0	X	7
(Ontario) Brad Jacobs	1	0	0	2	0	0	1	0	2	X	6

==== Draw 4 ====
Thursday, December 3, 8:30 am

Sheet B	1	2	3	4	5	6	7	8	9	10	Final
(Saskatchewan) Steve Laycock	0	0	2	0	1	0	1	0	2	X	6
(Alberta) Kevin Koe	0	1	0	2	0	1	0	4	0	X	8

Sheet E	1	2	3	4	5	6	7	8	9	10	Final
(Manitoba) Reid Carruthers	0	2	0	0	1	0	1	0	X	X	4
(Manitoba) Mike McEwen	2	0	1	0	0	2	0	4	X	X	9

==== Draw 5 ====
Thursday, December 3, 1:30 pm

Sheet A	1	2	3	4	5	6	7	8	9	10	Final
(Ontario) Brad Jacobs	2	1	0	0	0	2	1	1	X	X	7
(Saskatchewan) Steve Laycock	0	0	0	0	2	0	0	0	X	X	2

Sheet B	1	2	3	4	5	6	7	8	9	10	Final
(Alberta) Kevin Koe	1	0	2	0	1	0	0	1	0	0	5
(Ontario) John Epping	0	1	0	2	0	2	0	0	2	2	9

Sheet C	1	2	3	4	5	6	7	8	9	10	Final
(Manitoba) Reid Carruthers	0	2	0	0	0	1	0	1	0	0	4
(Alberta) Pat Simmons	0	0	0	2	0	0	1	0	0	2	5

Sheet D	1	2	3	4	5	6	7	8	9	10	Final
(Newfoundland and Labrador) Brad Gushue	0	1	0	2	0	0	0	2	0	1	6
(Manitoba) Mike McEwen	0	0	1	0	3	0	0	0	1	0	5

==== Draw 6 ====
Thursday, December 3, 6:30 pm

Sheet A	1	2	3	4	5	6	7	8	9	10	Final
(Newfoundland and Labrador) Brad Gushue	0	1	0	0	0	1	0	2	0	X	4
(Alberta) Pat Simmons	0	0	0	0	3	0	1	0	2	X	6

Sheet E	1	2	3	4	5	6	7	8	9	10	Final
(Ontario) Brad Jacobs	0	2	0	0	1	1	0	3	X	X	7
(Ontario) John Epping	0	0	0	1	0	0	2	0	X	X	3

==== Draw 7 ====
Friday, December 4, 8:30 am

Sheet D	1	2	3	4	5	6	7	8	9	10	Final
(Manitoba) Reid Carruthers	2	0	1	0	0	0	0	0	1	0	4
(Alberta) Kevin Koe	0	1	0	2	0	1	2	0	0	1	7

Sheet E	1	2	3	4	5	6	7	8	9	10	Final
(Saskatchewan) Steve Laycock	1	0	0	0	1	0	1	1	1	X	5
(Alberta) Pat Simmons	0	0	0	0	0	1	0	0	0	X	1

==== Draw 8 ====
Friday, December 4, 1:30 pm

Sheet A	1	2	3	4	5	6	7	8	9	10	Final
(Manitoba) Mike McEwen	0	1	0	0	2	0	1	0	0	1	5
(Alberta) Kevin Koe	1	0	1	0	0	1	0	1	0	0	4

Sheet B	1	2	3	4	5	6	7	8	9	10	Final
(Newfoundland and Labrador) Brad Gushue	0	1	0	2	2	0	0	4	X	X	9
(Saskatchewan) Steve Laycock	0	0	1	0	0	2	0	0	X	X	3

Sheet C	1	2	3	4	5	6	7	8	9	10	11	Final
(Ontario) Brad Jacobs	0	0	2	1	0	0	1	0	1	1	0	6
(Manitoba) Reid Carruthers	0	1	0	0	2	1	0	2	0	0	1	7

Sheet D	1	2	3	4	5	6	7	8	9	10	Final
(Alberta) Pat Simmons	1	0	1	2	2	0	0	1	1	X	8
(Ontario) John Epping	0	4	0	0	0	0	2	0	0	X	6

==== Draw 9 ====
Friday, December 4, 6:30 pm

Sheet B	1	2	3	4	5	6	7	8	9	10	Final
(Manitoba) Mike McEwen	2	0	1	0	0	0	0	2	0	3	8
(Ontario) Brad Jacobs	0	1	0	1	1	1	0	0	2	0	6

Sheet C	1	2	3	4	5	6	7	8	9	10	Final
(Ontario) John Epping	2	0	1	0	0	2	0	0	3	0	8
(Newfoundland and Labrador) Brad Gushue	0	1	0	2	1	0	0	1	0	1	6

==== Draw 10 ====
Saturday, December 5, 7:30 am

Sheet A	1	2	3	4	5	6	7	8	9	10	Final
(Ontario) John Epping	1	1	0	2	0	5	0	X	X	X	9
(Manitoba) Reid Carruthers	0	0	1	0	2	0	1	X	X	X	4

Sheet C	1	2	3	4	5	6	7	8	9	10	Final
(Alberta) Pat Simmons	0	1	1	1	0	0	0	1	0	0	4
(Alberta) Kevin Koe	0	0	0	0	1	0	3	0	2	1	7

Sheet D	1	2	3	4	5	6	7	8	9	10	Final
(Saskatchewan) Steve Laycock	1	0	1	0	0	2	0	0	X	X	4
(Manitoba) Mike McEwen	0	4	0	2	0	0	2	2	X	X	10

Sheet E	1	2	3	4	5	6	7	8	9	10	Final
(Newfoundland and Labrador) Brad Gushue	0	3	0	3	0	0	0	0	2	X	8
(Ontario) Brad Jacobs	1	0	1	0	1	1	0	1	0	X	5

=== Tiebreaker ===
Saturday, December 5, 12:30 pm

Sheet E	1	2	3	4	5	6	7	8	9	10	Final
(Ontario) John Epping	2	0	2	0	0	1	0	0	1	1	7
(Alberta) Pat Simmons	0	2	0	0	2	0	0	1	0	0	5

Player percentages
(Ontario) Team Epping		(Alberta) Team Simmons	
Tim March	86%	Nolan Thiessen	96%
Patrick Janssen	88%	Carter Rycroft	75%
Mathew Camm	80%	John Morris	90%
John Epping	88%	Pat Simmons	86%
Total	85%	Total	87%

=== Playoffs ===
Semifinal			Final
			1	(Manitoba) Mike McEwen	3
2	(Alberta) Kevin Koe	7	2	(Alberta) Kevin Koe	7
3	(Ontario) John Epping	6

==== Semifinal ====
Saturday, December 5, 6:30 pm

Sheet C	1	2	3	4	5	6	7	8	9	10	11	Final
(Alberta) Kevin Koe	2	0	0	1	0	0	2	0	1	0	1	7
(Ontario) John Epping	0	1	0	0	2	0	0	1	0	2	0	6

Player percentages
(Alberta) Team Koe		(Ontario) Team Epping	
Ben Hebert	99%	Tim March	97%
Brent Laing	90%	Patrick Janssen	89%
Marc Kennedy	90%	Mathew Camm	80%
Kevin Koe	85%	John Epping	84%
Total	91%	Total	87%

==== Final ====
Sunday, December 6, 5:00 pm

Team	1	2	3	4	5	6	7	8	9	10	Final
(Manitoba) Mike McEwen	0	0	0	1	0	1	0	1	0	X	3
(Alberta) Kevin Koe	1	0	0	0	2	0	1	0	3	X	7

Player percentages
(Manitoba) Team McEwen		(Alberta) Team Koe	
Denni Neufeld	82%	Ben Hebert	86%
Matt Wozniak	89%	Brent Laing	93%
B.J. Neufeld	83%	Marc Kennedy	90%
Mike McEwen	87%	Kevin Koe	92%
Total	85%	Total	90%

== Women ==
=== Teams ===
The teams are listed as follows:

Skip	Third	Second	Lead	Locale
Tracy Fleury	Crystal Webster	Amanda Gates	Jennifer Horgan	(Ontario) Idylwylde G&CC, Sudbury
Rachel Homan	Emma Miskew	Joanne Courtney	Lisa Weagle	(Ontario) Ottawa CC, Ottawa
Jennifer Jones	Kaitlyn Lawes	Jill Officer	Dawn McEwen	(Manitoba) St. Vital CC, Winnipeg
Kristy McDonald	Kate Cameron	Leslie Wilson	Raunora Westcott	(Manitoba) Granite CC, Winnipeg
Sherry Middaugh	Jo-Ann Rizzo	Lee Merklinger	Leigh Armstrong	(Ontario) Coldwater & District CC, Coldwater
Kelsey Rocque	Laura Crocker	Taylor McDonald	Jennifer Gates	(Alberta) Saville SC, Edmonton
Val Sweeting	Lori Olson-Johns	Dana Ferguson	Rachelle Brown	(Alberta) Saville SC, Edmonton

=== Round-robin standings ===
Final round-robin standings

Key
Teams to Playoffs
Teams to Tiebreaker

Skip	W	L
(Ontario) Rachel Homan	5	1
(Manitoba) Jennifer Jones	4	2
(Alberta) Val Sweeting	4	2
(Ontario) Sherry Middaugh	4	2
(Alberta) Kelsey Rocque	2	4
(Manitoba) Kristy McDonald	1	5
(Ontario) Tracy Fleury	1	5

=== Round-robin results ===
All draw times listed are in Mountain Standard Time (UTC−7).

==== Draw 1 ====
Wednesday, December 2, 8:30 am

Sheet A	1	2	3	4	5	6	7	8	9	10	Final
(Alberta) Kelsey Rocque	0	2	0	1	0	0	2	0	0	2	7
(Manitoba) Kristy McDonald	0	0	1	0	2	1	0	1	1	0	6

Sheet B	1	2	3	4	5	6	7	8	9	10	Final
(Ontario) Rachel Homan	4	1	0	0	1	2	0	0	X	X	8
(Alberta) Val Sweeting	0	0	2	0	0	0	1	0	X	X	3

Sheet C	1	2	3	4	5	6	7	8	9	10	Final
(Manitoba) Jennifer Jones	0	0	1	0	0	0	0	1	0	X	2
(Ontario) Sherry Middaugh	1	0	0	2	1	1	1	0	1	X	7

==== Draw 2 ====
Wednesday, December 2, 1:30 pm

Sheet B	1	2	3	4	5	6	7	8	9	10	Final
(Manitoba) Kristy McDonald	0	0	3	1	0	1	1	0	1	0	7
(Ontario) Tracy Fleury	1	0	0	0	1	0	0	1	0	0	3

Sheet D	1	2	3	4	5	6	7	8	9	10	Final
(Ontario) Sherry Middaugh	0	1	1	0	0	2	0	0	2	1	7
(Alberta) Kelsey Rocque	0	0	0	2	1	0	2	0	0	0	5

==== Draw 3 ====
Wednesday, December 2, 6:30 pm

Sheet A	1	2	3	4	5	6	7	8	9	10	Final
(Manitoba) Jennifer Jones	1	0	1	0	0	0	0	2	1	0	5
(Ontario) Rachel Homan	0	0	0	1	2	0	1	0	0	2	6

Sheet E	1	2	3	4	5	6	7	8	9	10	Final
(Alberta) Val Sweeting	2	0	0	4	0	1	0	0	1	X	8
(Ontario) Tracy Fleury	0	1	1	0	1	0	3	0	0	X	6

==== Draw 4 ====
Thursday, December 3, 8:30 am

Sheet A	1	2	3	4	5	6	7	8	9	10	Final
(Alberta) Val Sweeting	2	0	0	3	2	0	1	0	X	X	8
(Ontario) Sherry Middaugh	0	1	1	0	0	1	0	1	X	X	4

Sheet C	1	2	3	4	5	6	7	8	9	10	Final
(Manitoba) Kristy McDonald	0	0	0	3	0	0	0	1	0	X	4
(Ontario) Rachel Homan	0	2	1	0	0	2	1	0	2	X	8

Sheet D	1	2	3	4	5	6	7	8	9	10	Final
(Ontario) Tracy Fleury	0	2	0	0	1	0	1	0	X	X	4
(Manitoba) Jennifer Jones	0	0	2	4	0	3	0	0	X	X	9

==== Draw 5 ====
Thursday, December 3, 1:30 pm

Sheet E	1	2	3	4	5	6	7	8	9	10	Final
(Ontario) Rachel Homan	2	1	3	0	0	2	0	1	X	X	9
(Alberta) Kelsey Rocque	0	0	0	0	1	0	1	0	X	X	2

==== Draw 6 ====
Thursday, December 3, 6:30 pm

Sheet B	1	2	3	4	5	6	7	8	9	10	Final
(Alberta) Kelsey Rocque	0	2	1	0	1	0	0	0	1	0	5
(Manitoba) Jennifer Jones	1	0	0	2	0	1	2	1	0	1	8

Sheet C	1	2	3	4	5	6	7	8	9	10	Final
(Ontario) Sherry Middaugh	0	0	1	0	1	0	0	0	1	0	3
(Ontario) Tracy Fleury	0	2	0	0	0	0	0	1	0	1	4

Sheet D	1	2	3	4	5	6	7	8	9	10	Final
(Alberta) Val Sweeting	2	0	1	0	2	0	1	1	1	X	8
(Manitoba) Kristy McDonald	0	1	0	1	0	1	0	0	0	X	3

==== Draw 7 ====
Friday, December 4, 8:30 am

Sheet A	1	2	3	4	5	6	7	8	9	10	Final
(Manitoba) Kristy McDonald	0	1	0	1	0	1	0	1	X	X	4
(Manitoba) Jennifer Jones	3	0	1	0	3	0	4	0	X	X	11

Sheet B	1	2	3	4	5	6	7	8	9	10	Final
(Ontario) Tracy Fleury	1	0	0	1	0	0	2	0	1	X	5
(Ontario) Rachel Homan	0	1	1	0	1	1	0	3	0	X	7

Sheet C	1	2	3	4	5	6	7	8	9	10	Final
(Alberta) Kelsey Rocque	0	0	1	0	2	0	0	1	X	X	4
(Alberta) Val Sweeting	0	3	0	2	0	2	3	0	X	X	10

==== Draw 8 ====
Friday, December 4, 1:30 pm

Sheet E	1	2	3	4	5	6	7	8	9	10	Final
(Ontario) Sherry Middaugh	0	2	0	1	0	0	0	1	2	1	7
(Manitoba) Kristy McDonald	0	0	1	0	3	0	1	0	0	0	5

==== Draw 9 ====
Friday, December 4, 8:30 pm

Sheet A	1	2	3	4	5	6	7	8	9	10	Final
(Ontario) Tracy Fleury	0	1	0	4	0	0	1	0	2	0	8
(Alberta) Kelsey Rocque	1	0	2	0	1	2	0	3	0	2	11

Sheet D	1	2	3	4	5	6	7	8	9	10	Final
(Ontario) Rachel Homan	0	0	1	0	1	0	1	0	1	0	4
(Ontario) Sherry Middaugh	0	0	0	2	0	1	0	2	0	1	6

Sheet E	1	2	3	4	5	6	7	8	9	10	Final
(Manitoba) Jennifer Jones	2	0	3	0	1	2	1	0	X	X	9
(Alberta) Val Sweeting	0	1	0	1	0	0	0	1	X	X	3

==== Tiebreaker ====
Saturday, December 5, 11:30 am

Sheet B	1	2	3	4	5	6	7	8	9	10	Final
(Alberta) Val Sweeting	1	0	0	0	2	1	0	1	2	X	7
(Ontario) Sherry Middaugh	0	0	0	2	0	0	1	0	0	X	3

Player percentages
(Alberta) Team Sweeting		(Ontario) Team Middaugh	
Rachelle Brown	94%	Leigh Armstrong	90%
Dana Ferguson	89%	Lee Merklinger	85%
Lori Olson-Johns	92%	Jo-Ann Rizzo	85%
Val Sweeting	92%	Sherry Middaugh	76%
Total	92%	Total	84%

=== Playoffs ===
Semifinal			Final
			1	(Ontario) Rachel Homan	8
2	(Manitoba) Jennifer Jones	3	3	(Alberta) Val Sweeting	7
3	(Alberta) Val Sweeting	5

==== Semifinal ====
Saturday, December 5, 1:30 pm

Sheet C	1	2	3	4	5	6	7	8	9	10	Final
(Manitoba) Jennifer Jones	0	0	0	0	1	1	0	0	1	0	3
(Alberta) Val Sweeting	0	0	2	0	0	0	0	2	0	1	5

Player percentages
(Manitoba) Team Jones		(Alberta) Team Sweeting	
Dawn McEwen	98%	Rachelle Brown	86%
Jill Officer	89%	Dana Ferguson	94%
Kaitlyn Lawes	94%	Lori Olson-Johns	93%
Jennifer Jones	88%	Val Sweeting	99%
Total	92%	Total	93%

==== Final ====
Sunday, December 6, 11:00 am

Team	1	2	3	4	5	6	7	8	9	10	11	Final
(Ontario) Rachel Homan	0	2	0	1	0	1	0	2	1	0	1	8
(Alberta) Val Sweeting	0	0	3	0	2	0	1	0	0	1	0	7

Player percentages
(Ontario) Team Homan		(Alberta) Team Sweeting	
Lisa Weagle	92%	Rachelle Brown	85%
Joanne Courtney	75%	Dana Ferguson	70%
Emma Miskew	83%	Lori Olson-Johns	85%
Rachel Homan	85%	Val Sweeting	70%
Total	84%	Total	78%
