= Andrea Lawes =

Canadian curler and coach

- Curler
- Born: October 11, 1962 (age 64); Toronto, Ontario, Canada

Team
- Curling club: Bayview G&CC, Thornhill, ON, Rideau CC, Ottawa, Brantford G&CC, Brantford, Coldwater & District CC, Coldwater, ON

Curling career
- Member Association: Ontario
- Hearts: 5 (1990, 1991, 2001, 2002, 2004)
- World Championship: 1 (1990)
Medal record
Curling
Representing Canada
World Championships
Bronze medal – third place	1990 Västerås
Representing Ontario
Scotties Tournament of Hearts
Gold medal – first place	1990 Ottawa
Bronze medal – third place	2001 Sudbury
Bronze medal – third place	2002 Brandon
Bronze medal – third place	2004 Red Deer
Canada Cup
Gold medal – first place	2003 Kamloops

Andrea Lawes (born October 11, 1962) is a Canadian curler from Whitby, Ontario.

She is a 1990 World women's bronze medallist and 1990 Canadian women's champion.

== Awards ==
- STOH All-Star Team: 1990
- Ford Hot Shots: 2004
- Whitby Sports Hall of Fame: 2010

== Teams and events ==
=== Women's ===
Season	Skip	Third	Second	Lead	Alternate	Coach	Events
1989–90	Alison Goring	Kristin Turcotte	Andrea Lawes	Cheryl McPherson	Anne Merklinger		STOH 1990 (gold); WCC 1990 (bronze)
1990–91	Alison Goring	Kristin Turcotte	Andrea Lawes	Cheryl McPherson	Anne Merklinger		STOH 1991 (6th)
2000–01	Sherry Middaugh	Janet Brown	Andrea Lawes	Sheri Cordina	Kirsten Harmark		STOH 2001 (bronze)
2001–02	Sherry Middaugh	Janet Brown	Andrea Lawes	Sheri Cordina	Kirsten Harmark	Pat B Reid	COCT 2001 (5th); STOH 2002 (bronze)
2003–04	Sherry Middaugh	Kirsten Wall	Andrea Lawes	Sheri Cordina	Jenn Hanna (STOH)	Pat Reid	CC 2003 (gold); ContC 2003 (silver); STOH 2004 (bronze)
2004–05	Sherry Middaugh	Kirsten Wall	Andrea Lawes	Sheri Greenman			
2005–06	Sherry Middaugh	Kirsten Wall	Andrea Lawes	Sheri Greenman	Cathy King	Pat B Reid	COCT 2005 (4th)
2012–13	Mary Chilvers	Andrea Lawes	Debbie Thompson	Gloria Ryan			
2013–14	Mary Chilvers	Andrea Lawes	Kelly Evans	Debbie Thompson			

=== Mixed ===
Season	Skip	Third	Second	Lead	Events
1989–90	Bob Turcotte	Kristin Turcotte	Dick Howson	Andrea Lawes	
1998–99	Bob Turcotte	Kristin Turcotte	Roy Weigand	Andrea Lawes	CMxCC 1999 (bronze)
2007–08	Bob Turcotte	Kristin Turcotte	Roy Weigand	Andrea Lawes	CMxCC 2008 (silver)

== Private life ==
Her half sister is Kaitlyn Lawes, Olympic and World curling champion. Lawes attended Oak Park Public School in London, Ontario, Collingwood Senior Public School in Collingwood, Ontario, Henry Street High School in Whitby, Ontario and also Seneca College. She works for Ontario Power Generation in Pickering, Ontario. She moved to Whitby with her family in 1976.
