= Ford Hot Shots =

Former curling skills competition

The Ford Hot Shots was the annual skills competition preceding both the Scotties Tournament of Hearts and the Tim Hortons Brier, Canada's women's and men's national curling championships respectively. The competition has not been held since 2018.

== History ==
When Ford became a sponsor of the World Curling Championships in 1995, it also began a tradition of a skills competition preceding Canada's national championships.

The change in competition format for the 2018 Tournament of Hearts and 2018 Brier led to a change in format for the Hot Shots. Fifteen teams would compete instead of individual curlers, with the winning team being awarded a cheque for $15,000 and one of four Hot Shots spectators winning the two-year lease on the Ford vehicle. The three finalist spectators would each receive $500 to donate to the charities of their choice.

== Disciplines ==
There were six disciplines that each competitor (for 2018, each team) had to do:

- The "hit and stay" (they must hit a rock on the button and not roll out)
- The "draw to the button" (they must throw the rock as close as possible to the centre of the rings)
- The "draw through the port" (the must throw the rock as close as possible to the centre of the rings, but go between two guard rocks in the process.
- The "raise" (they must bump a guard rock into the rings as close as possible to the centre)
- The "hit and roll" (they must hit a rock at the edge of the rings and roll as close as possible to the centre of the rings)
- The "double" (they must remove two rocks with one stone, and end up as close as possible to the centre of the rings)

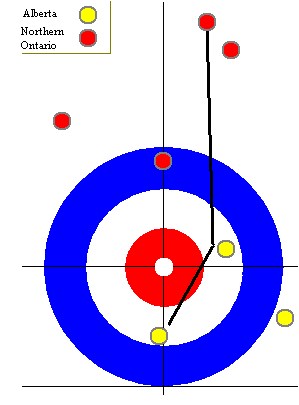
The "Hackner Double"

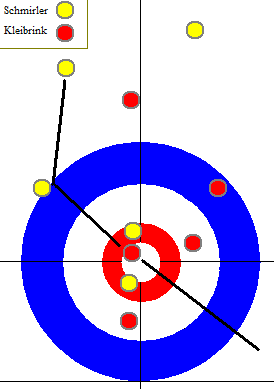
The "Schmirler in-off"

Since 2017, the event included five new disciplines:

- The "Hackner double", replicating Al Hackner's famous double takeout at the 1985 Labatt Brier.
- The "Schmirler shot", replicating Sandra Schmirler's in-off at the 1997 Canadian Olympic Curling Trials to send her team to the 1998 Winter Olympics.
- A "straight raise to the button"
- A "drag-effect double takeout"
- An "around the horn triple takeout for two".

== Scoring ==
For each shot, where the shooter rock came to rest determined how many points were earned. A rock that ended up on the button received 5 points. A rock that ended up in the 4 foot ring got 4 points. 8 foot ring, 3; 12 foot for 2; and one point if a "shot has been to have provided some sort of positive result."

== Prizes ==
Until 2018, the winner of the Hot Shots received a 2-year lease on a Ford vehicle. First and Second runners-up received cash ($2000 and $1000 respectively). In 2009, the women's winner received a lease on a 2009 Ford Flex SEL FWD and the men's winner received a lease on a 2009 Ford F-150 XLT 4x4. In 2013 the lease vehicle was a Ford Fusion SE.

Winning women's vehicles:

- 1995: Ford Contour GL
- 1996: Mercury Mystique
- 1997: Ford Contour
- 1998: Mercury Mystique LS
- 1999: Mercury Mystique LS
- 2000: Ford Taurus SE
- 2001: Ford Taurus SE
- 2002: Ford Focus SE Wagon
- 2003: Ford Focus ZX5
- 2004: Ford Escape XLT FWD
- 2005: Ford Freestyle SEL
- 2006: Ford Explorer XLT
- 2007: Ford Edge
- 2008: Ford Fusion SEL V6
- 2009: Ford Flex SEL FWD
- 2010: Ford Taurus SEL FWD
- 2011: Ford Edge FW
- 2012: Ford Focus Titanium
- 2013: Ford Fusion SE 2.0L
- 2014: Ford Fusion SE 2.0L AWD
- 2015: Ford F-150 XLT
- 2016: Ford Edge Sport EcoBoost
- 2017: Ford Escape SE
- 2018: Ford Escape SE

== Winners ==
Year	Women	Men
1995	(Saskatchewan) Kay Montgomery	(Ontario) Ed Werenich
1996	(Manitoba) Gerri Cooke	(New Brunswick) Rick Perron
1997	(British Columbia) Sherry Fraser	(Northern Ontario) Mike Coulter
1998	(New Brunswick) Allison Franey	(British Columbia) Greg McAulay
1999	(Alberta) Marcy Balderston	(Manitoba) Steve Gould
2000	(British Columbia) Kelley Law	(Alberta) Don Bartlett
2001	(Canada) Kelley Law	(New Brunswick) Jeff Lacey
2002	(British Columbia) Kristy Lewis	(British Columbia) Pat Ryan
2003	(Prince Edward Island) Suzanne Gaudet	(New Brunswick) Marc LeCocq
2004	(Ontario) Andrea Lawes	(Alberta) Randy Ferbey
2005	(Ontario) Jenn Hanna	(Newfoundland and Labrador) Mark Nichols
2006	(Nova Scotia) Colleen Jones	(Manitoba) Steve Gould
2007	(Northwest Territories) Kelli Turpin	(Alberta) John Morris
2008	(Manitoba) Jill Officer	(Saskatchewan) Steve Laycock
2009	(Alberta) Cheryl Bernard	(Ontario) Craig Savill
2010	(Saskatchewan) Amber Holland	(Ontario) Glenn Howard
2011	(Canada) Jennifer Jones	(Ontario) Richard Hart
2012	(Northwest Territories) Kerry Galusha	(Ontario) Wayne Middaugh
2013	(Ontario) Rachel Homan	(Alberta) Marc Kennedy
2014	(Newfoundland and Labrador) Heather Strong	(Saskatchewan) Kirk Muyres
2015	(Newfoundland and Labrador) Heather Strong	(Manitoba) Colin Hodgson
2016	(Canada) Jennifer Jones	(Newfoundland and Labrador) Brad Gushue
2017	(Ontario) Rachel Homan	(Northern Ontario) Brad Jacobs
2018	Manitoba (Team Jennifer Jones)	Northern Ontario (Team Brad Jacobs)
