= Diane Dezura =

Canadian curler and Olympic medalist

- Curler ♀
- Born: Diane Nelson; July 1, 1958 (age 68); Burnaby, British Columbia, Canada

Curling career
- Hearts: 5 (1988, 1989, 2000, 2001, 2004)
- World Championship: 1 (2000)
- Olympic: 1 (2002)
Medal record
Women's curling
Representing Canada
Olympic Games
Bronze medal – third place	2002 Salt Lake City
World Championships
Gold medal – first place	2000 Glasgow
Representing British Columbia
Scott Tournament of Hearts
Gold medal – first place	2000 Prince George
Silver medal – second place	2001 Sudbury
Canadian Olympic Curling Trials
Gold medal – first place	2001 Regina

Diane Dezura (born July 1, 1958 in Burnaby, British Columbia as Diane Nelson) is a Canadian retired curler and Olympic medallist. As Diane Nelson, she played lead on for the Kelley Law rink in the early 2000s, one of the best teams in the world at the time. While she was with the team, the Law rink won a world championship in 2000 and a bronze medal at the 2002 Winter Olympics in Salt Lake City.

In her career, Dezura played in five Scott Tournament of Hearts, in 1988, 1989, 2000, 2001 and in 2004, winning the event in 2000.

== Personal life ==
Dezura retired from curling in 2004. She is married to fellow curler Grant Dezura and they live in Maple Ridge, British Columbia with their two children, Ashley Ann and Wally.
