= Kim Kelly (curler) =

Canadian curler (born 1962)

- Curler
- Born: Kim Ackles; April 4, 1962 (age 64); Halifax, Nova Scotia

Team
- Curling club: Mayflower CC, Halifax, NS

Curling career
- Member Association: Nova Scotia
- Hearts: 18 (1989, 1991, 1992, 1994, 1996, 1997, 1999, 2000, 2001, 2002, 2003, 2004, 2005, 2006, 2008, 2013, 2019, 2021)
- World Championship: 5 (1999, 2001, 2002, 2003, 2004)
- Top CTRS ranking: 2nd (2003–04)
Medal record
Women's curling
Representing Canada
World Championships
Gold medal – first place	2001 Lausanne
Gold medal – first place	2004 Gävle
Silver medal – second place	2003 Winnipeg
Scotties Tournament of Hearts
Gold medal – first place	1999 Charlottetown
Gold medal – first place	2001 Sudbury
Gold medal – first place	2002 Brandon
Gold medal – first place	2003 Kitchener
Gold medal – first place	2004 Red Deer
Bronze medal – third place	2006 London
Canadian Olympic Trials
Bronze medal – third place	2001 Regina
World Senior Championships
Gold medal – first place	2017 Lethbridge
Canadian Senior Championships
Gold medal – first place	2016 Digby
Silver medal – second place	2015 Edmonton

Kim Kelly (born April 4, 1962, in Halifax, Nova Scotia as Kim Ackles) is a Canadian former curler from Dartmouth, Nova Scotia. She has won five national championships and two world championships.

In 2019, Kelly was named the eighth greatest Canadian curler in history in a TSN poll of broadcasters, reporters and top curlers.

Kelly had retired from competitive curling in 2006 but returned in 2010 playing third for Nancy Delahunt, failing to secure a spot in the provincial playdowns. She would then go on to join former teammate Mary-Anne Arsenault, playing the second position for the 2011–12 season.

For the 2012–2013 season Arsenault and Kelly reunited with former skip Colleen Jones, with the goal of reaching the 2014 Winter Olympics in Sochi, Russia. Jones played second, while Arsenault was skip. Jenn Baxter, played lead, while Stephanie McVicar, joined the team as the fifth. Nancy Delahunt was offered to join the team as coach or manager. Since this announcement McVicar left the team to play with Heather Smith-Dacey, and Delahunt joined the team as the fifth. Jones played second, and Kelly remained at third.

Kelly (as third) joined Jones, Mary Sue Radford and Delahunt to win the 2016 Canadian Senior Curling Championships, following that with an undefeated run to win the 2017 World Senior Curling Championships in Lethbridge, Alberta.

She currently coaches the Matthew Manuel rink.

== Personal life ==
Kelly is married and has two children. She is a retired pharmacist.
