= Nancy Delahunt =

Canadian curler (born 1959)

- Curler
- Other names: Nancy Dale Delahunt
- Born: January 5, 1959 (age 67); Montreal, Quebec, Canada

Team
- Curling club: Mayflower CC, Halifax, NS

Curling career
- Hearts: 13: (1991, 1996, 1997, 1999, 2000, 2001, 2002, 2003, 2004, 2005, 2006, 2008, 2013)
- World Championship: 5 (1999, 2001, 2002, 2003, 2004)
- Top CTRS ranking: 2nd (2003–04)
- Grand Slam victories: 0
Medal record
Women's curling
Representing Canada
World Championships
Gold medal – first place	2001 Lausanne
Gold medal – first place	2004 Gävle
Silver medal – second place	2003 Winnipeg
Scotties Tournament of Hearts
Gold medal – first place	1999 Charlottetown
Gold medal – first place	2001 Sudbury
Gold medal – first place	2002 Brandon
Gold medal – first place	2003 Kitchener
Gold medal – first place	2004 Red Deer
Bronze medal – third place	2006 London
Canadian Olympic Trials
Bronze medal – third place	2001 Regina
World Senior Championships
Gold medal – first place	2017 Lethbridge
Canadian Senior Championships
Gold medal – first place	2016 Digby
Silver medal – second place	2015 Edmonton
Bronze medal – third place	2012 Abbotsford

Nancy Dale Delahunt (born January 5, 1959) is a Canadian former curler from Halifax, Nova Scotia.

== Career ==
Delahunt was born in Montreal, Quebec. She was a member of the Colleen Jones team which won five Scott Tournament of Hearts (1999, 2001, 2002, 2003, 2004) and two World Curling Championships (2001, 2004). Delahunt was a rarity among leads, because she held the broom for when Jones threw. She rejoined Jones in 2011 participating in the Nova Scotia Senior Women's Championship, along with Marsha Sobey and Sally Saunders. The team won the provincial title and would represent Nova Scotia at the Canadian Senior Women's Curling Championships.

At the beginning of the 2011/2012 curling season Jones had formed a rink with three players, all of whom previously played with Theresa Breen. However Jones has modified her lineup adding Delahunt at third, Sobey at second and Mary Sue Radford (who began the season with Jones) at lead. The team has entered the qualifying round for the Nova Scotia Scotties with a goal of advancing to provincials and winning the title.

For the 2012/2013 season Jones reunited with Mary-Anne Arsenault and Kim Kelly, with the goal of reaching the 2014 Winter Olympics in Sochi, Russia. Jones will either play third or second position, while Arsenault will skip. Arsenault's current lead Jennifer Baxter, will play lead, while her third Stephanie McVicar, is expected to join the team as the fifth. Delahunt has offered to join the team as coach or manager. Since this announcement McVicar has left the team to play with Heather Smith-Dacey, and Delahunt has joined the team as the 5th. Jones will play third, and Kelly will remain at second.

Delahunt (as lead) joined Jones, Kelly, and Radford to win the 2016 Canadian Senior Curling Championships, following that with an undefeated run to win the 2017 World Senior Curling Championships in Lethbridge, Alberta.

She is currently president of the Clayton Park Chapter of the NCDC.
