= Kirsten Wall =

Canadian curler

- Curler
- Born: Kirsten Harmark; November 27, 1975 (age 50); Milton, Ontario, Canada

Team
- Curling club: Milton CC, Milton, ON

Curling career
- Member Association: Ontario
- Hearts: 4 (2001, 2002, 2004, 2008)
- Top CTRS ranking: 4th (2003–04)
- Grand Slam victories: 1 (Sobeys Slam: 2007)
Medal record
Curling
Representing Canada
Winter Olympics
Gold medal – first place	2014 Sochi
Representing Ontario
Scotties Tournament of Hearts
Bronze medal – third place	2004 Red Deer
Bronze medal – third place	2008 Regina
Representing Manitoba
Canadian Olympic Curling Trials
Gold medal – first place	2013 Winnipeg

Kirsten Wall (born November 27, 1975, as Kirsten Harmark) is a Canadian curler from Milton, Ontario. She was the alternate player on the Jennifer Jones rink which represented Canada at the 2014 Winter Olympics, receiving a gold medal.

== Curling career ==
In 1995 she, alongside teammates Nicole Pelligrin, Catherine Kemp and younger sister Andra Harmark, won the Ontario provincial junior curling championship as a skip, earning her team the right to represent Ontario at the 1995 Canadian Junior Curling Championships. She lost in the final that year to Kelly MacKenzie (Scott).

A number of years later, Wall joined the Sherry Middaugh team, first as her alternate, and then in 2002 as her third. In 2003, Wall won the Canada Cup of Curling as third for Middaugh. Wall played in her first Tournament of Hearts in 2004 after not having played in two previous trip as Middaugh's alternate. The team lost in the semi-final to Quebec's Marie-France Larouche. In 2008, the team went to the Hearts again, losing in the semi-final to Manitoba's Jennifer Jones.

Wall left the Middaugh team in 2010 to form her own rink with Hollie Nicol, Danielle Inglis and Jill Mouzar. The team lasted for two seasons.

Wall joined the Jennifer Jones team for the first half of the 2012/13 season playing third, as Jones was expecting her first child and sat out until January.

== Personal life ==
Wall studied Biology and Genetics at McMaster University and the Michener Institute for Applied Health Sciences. She is a senior genetic technologist at Credit Valley Hospital in Mississauga. She is married to Trevor Wall, who had competed at the 2004 Nokia Brier.

== Grand Slam record ==
Key
C	Champion
F	Lost in Final
SF	Lost in Semifinal
QF	Lost in Quarterfinals
R16	Lost in the round of 16
Q	Did not advance to playoffs
T2	Played in Tier 2 event
DNP	Did not participate in event
N/A	Not a Grand Slam event that season

Event	2007–08	2008–09	2009–10	2010–11	2011–12	2012–13
Autumn Gold	Q	SF	Q	DNP	DNP	Q
Manitoba Lotteries	DNP	Q	DNP	DNP	DNP	QF
Colonial Square Ladies Classic	N/A	N/A	N/A	N/A	N/A	R16
The Masters Grand Slam of Curling	N/A	N/A	N/A	N/A	N/A	Q
Players' Championships	QF	QF	DNP	DNP	DNP	DNP

=== Former events ===
Event	2007–08	2008–09	2009–10	2010–11
Wayden Transportation	Q	Q	N/A	N/A
Sobeys Slam	C	SF	N/A	Q
