= Sherry Middaugh =

Canadian curler (born 1966)

Sherry L. Middaugh
- Curler
- Other names: Sherry Scheirich
- Born: Sherry L. Hamel; October 11, 1966 (age 60); Rosetown, Saskatchewan, Canada

Team
- Curling club: Barrie CC, Barrie, ON
- Skip: Sherry Middaugh
- Third: Kelly Middaugh
- Second: Emily Middaugh
- Lead: Megan Smith

Curling career
- Member Association: Saskatchewan (1995–1998); Ontario (1998–present)
- Hearts: 7 (1996, 1999, 2001, 2002, 2004, 2008, 2011)
- Top CTRS ranking: 3rd (2011–12)
- Grand Slam victories: 2: (2007 Sobeys Slam, 2012 Autumn Gold)
Medal record
Women's curling
Representing Canada
World Senior Championships
Bronze medal – third place	2026 Geneva
Representing Ontario
Canadian Olympic Curling Trials
Silver medal – second place	2013 Winnipeg
Scotties Tournament of Hearts
Bronze medal – third place	2001 Sudbury
Bronze medal – third place	2002 Brandon
Bronze medal – third place	2004 Red Deer
Bronze medal – third place	2008 Regina

Sherry L. Middaugh (née Hamel, born October 11, 1966, in Rosetown, Saskatchewan) is a Canadian curler from Victoria Harbour, Ontario. Before marrying world champion curler Wayne Middaugh, she was known as Sherry Scheirich. She is a five-time Ontario champion and a one-time Saskatchewan curling champion. She is currently the coach of Team Hollie Duncan.

== Career ==
Middaugh, originally from Saskatchewan, won the 1986 Saskatchewan Junior Women's Championship. She represented Saskatchewan at the 1986 Canadian Junior Women's Curling Championship, where she tied for fourth with a 6–4 record.

Her lone Saskatchewan Hearts victory came in 1996, when she defeated Sandra Peterson (Schmirler) in the provincial final, 8–5. She represented Saskatchewan at her first Scott Tournament of Hearts in 1996, and finished with a 7–5 record. In her new province of Ontario at the 1999 Scott Tournament of Hearts, she played third for Kim Gellard, but finished 4–7. She played at the 2001 Scott Tournament of Hearts. Middaugh led her team to the semifinals where she lost to Kelley Law of British Columbia. At the 2002 Scott Tournament of Hearts, Middaugh was ousted once again in the semifinals, this time to defending champion Colleen Jones. Middaugh failed to make the Scotts in 2003, but instead won the Canada Cup of Curling beating Kelley Law in the final. Middaugh qualified for the 2004 Scott Tournament of Hearts, but she lost in the semi-final to Quebec's Marie-France Larouche. In 2007, Middaugh won her first Grand Slam event by winning the 2007 Sobeys Slam. At the 2008 Scotties Tournament of Hearts, Middaugh lost in the semifinal to Manitoba's Jennifer Jones, her fourth semifinal loss. Middaugh also participated as a third for Laurel Kostuk at the 1986 Canadian Junior Championships and she won the 2003 JCV Skins Game. At the 2008 Scotties Tournament of Hearts Middaugh also won the Shot of the Week Award and a Bronze medal via a 9–8 loss to Manitoba's Jennifer Jones, in an extra end semifinal. Jones would go on to win the 2009 Scotties Tournament of Hearts in Victoria, B.C. as Team Canada.

Middaugh attended the 2011 Scotties Tournament of Hearts as the alternate for the Rachel Homan team. In 2012, she won her second Grand Slam event of her career by winning the 2012 Curlers Corner Autumn Gold Curling Classic, defeating Homan in the final.

At the 2013 Canadian Olympic Curling Trials, the team started slowly with a 1–3 record. However, the team won three straight games to finish the round-robin tied for second at 4–3 with the Chelsea Carey and Rachel Homan rinks. Homan claimed second based on the draw shot challenge while Middaugh and Carey played a tiebreaker. The Middaugh rink found success defeating Carey in the tiebreaker and defeating Homan in the semifinals. Middaugh's rink was unable to defeat the Jennifer Jones rink in the final, therefore claiming the silver medal at the event.

In 2019, Middaugh made her Canadian Senior Curling Championships debut at the 2019 Canadian Senior Curling Championships and placed second, losing in an extra end to Sherry Anderson. She started coaching the Tracy Fleury rink for the 2020–21 season.

Middaugh, and her rink of Karri-Lee Grant, Melissa Foster and Jane Hooper Perroud won the 2025 Canadian Senior Curling Championships, going undefeated at the event. They defeated Saskatchewan's Amber Holland rink in the final. The win gave Middaugh the right to represent Canada for the first time in her career, as she will get to play in the 2026 World Senior Curling Championships.

== Personal life ==
Middaugh owns her own company 4M Home & Garden. At the time of the 2001 Hearts, she worked at the Midland, Ontario YMCA as a youth worker. She is married to Wayne Middaugh and has two children, Kelly and Emily.

== Grand Slam record ==
Key
C	Champion
F	Lost in Final
SF	Lost in Semifinal
QF	Lost in Quarterfinals
R16	Lost in the round of 16
Q	Did not advance to playoffs
T2	Played in Tier 2 event
DNP	Did not participate in event
N/A	Not a Grand Slam event that season

Event	2006–07	2007–08	2008–09	2009–10	2010–11	2011–12	2012–13	2013–14	2014–15	2015–16	2016–17	2017–18	2018–19	2019–20	2020–21	2021–22	2022–23
The National	N/A	N/A	N/A	N/A	N/A	N/A	N/A	N/A	N/A	QF	DNP	DNP	DNP	DNP	N/A	DNP	Q
Tour Challenge	N/A	N/A	N/A	N/A	N/A	N/A	N/A	N/A	N/A	QF	Q	Q	DNP	DNP	N/A	N/A	DNP
Masters	N/A	N/A	N/A	N/A	N/A	N/A	QF	Q	QF	Q	DNP	Q	DNP	DNP	N/A	DNP	DNP
Canadian Open	N/A	N/A	N/A	N/A	N/A	N/A	N/A	N/A	QF	Q	DNP	DNP	DNP	DNP	N/A	N/A	DNP
Players'	QF	QF	QF	DNP	Q	SF	Q	Q	Q	DNP	DNP	DNP	DNP	N/A	DNP	DNP	DNP

=== Former events ===
Event	2006–07	2007–08	2008–09	2009–10	2010–11	2011–12	2012–13	2013–14	2014–15
Autumn Gold	QF	Q	SF	Q	DNP	SF	C	Q	DNP
Colonial Square	N/A	N/A	N/A	N/A	N/A	N/A	DNP	DNP	F
Manitoba Lotteries	DNP	DNP	Q	DNP	QF	Q	Q	DNP	N/A
Sobeys Slam	N/A	C	SF	N/A	Q	N/A	N/A	N/A	N/A
Wayden Transportation	Q	Q	Q	N/A	N/A	N/A	N/A	N/A	N/A
