= 1994 Canadian Mixed Curling Championship =

- Host city: Leduc, Alberta
- Arena: Leduc Curling Club
- Dates: March 26–April 2, 1994
- Attendance: 3,255
- Winner: New Brunswick
- Curling club: Beaver Curling Club, Moncton
- Skip: Grant Odishaw
- Third: Heather Smith
- Second: Rick Perron
- Lead: Krista Smith
- Finalist: British Columbia

The 1994 Canadian Mixed Curling Championship was held March 26–April 2 at the Leduc Curling Club in Leduc, Alberta.

Team New Brunswick, skipped by Grant Odishaw won the event, defeating British Columbia (Eric Wiltzen) in the final, 9–5. Costly mistakes by British Columbia in the ninth end led to a score of two for New Brunswick. Wiltzen's wife Jan had a hog line violation, while Wiltzen himself was heavy on a draw attempt. Both teams curled 73 per cent in the final. It was the first mixed title for New Brunswick. It was also the first time the province won two national titles in the same year, with David Sullivan winning the 1994 Canadian Senior Curling Championships, only one week prior.

For New Brunswick's third, Heather Smith, it was her second national title played in Leduc. She had also won the 1991 Canadian Junior Curling Championships there. For Odishaw, it was his first national title in five trips to the Canadian mixed.

== Format ==
The event featured 14 teams, split into two pools of seven. It included teams from each of the country's 13 member associations plus a host team. The teams played a round robin within their pools, with the top two teams in each pool going to a preliminary playoff. The remaining 10 teams dropped to a wild-card playoff, with one team making the playoffs. The playoffs consisted of the pool winners playing second place in the opposite group, with the losers playing off and the winners each of the three games advancing to a page playoff. The loser of the game played between the losers of the first games then played the winner of wild-card playoff. The winner of that game then qualified as the fourth page playoff team.

The format was heavily criticized by competitors due to how complicated it was, and the fact that not every team got to play against each other.

== Round robin ==
=== Standings ===
Key
| Teams to tiebreakers |

| Pool A | Skip | Locale | W | L |
|---|---|---|---|---|
| Nova Scotia | Scott Saunders | Halifax | 4 | 2 |
| Manitoba | Jeff Stoughton | Winnipeg | 4 | 2 |
| Alberta | Ralph Brust | Grande Prairie | 4 | 2 |
| Newfoundland | Keith Renouf | St. John's | 4 | 2 |
| New Brunswick | Grant Odishaw | Moncton | 4 | 2 |
| Ontario | Bob Ingram | Ridgetown | 1 | 5 |
| Northwest Territories | Trevor Alexander | Yellowknife | 0 | 6 |

| Pool B | Skip | Locale | W | L |
|---|---|---|---|---|
| British Columbia | Eric Wiltzen | Cranbrook | 4 | 2 |
| Alberta (Host) | Les Rogers | Edmonton | 4 | 2 |
| Northern Ontario | Rick Stewart | Schumacher | 4 | 2 |
| Saskatchewan | Charles Haichert | Saskatoon | 4 | 2 |
| Prince Edward Island | John Likely | Charlottetown | 3 | 3 |
| Quebec | Guy Hemmings | Tracy | 2 | 4 |
| Yukon | Doug Hannah | Whitehorse | 0 | 6 |

=== Tiebreakers ===
- New Brunswick 11, Newfoundland 3
- Manitoba 6, Alberta 4
- New Brunswick 5, Nova Scotia 4
- British Columbia 6, Saskatchewan 1
- Alberta (Host) 9, Northern Ontario 1

== Playoffs ==
=== Wild Card ===
Quarterfinals | Semifinals | Final
Ontario | 11
Yukon | 1 | Ontario | 6
Nova Scotia | 5
Ontario | 2
Alberta | 3
Alberta | 6
Prince Edward Island | 2
Alberta | 2
Quebec | 8 | Northern Ontario | 3
Northwest Territories | 6 | Quebec | 4
Northern Ontario | 6
Northern Ontario | 8
Newfoundland | 3
Newfoundland | 8
Saskatchewan | 6

=== Preliminary round ===
By losing both of their games, Alberta (Host) did not advance to the page playoffs. All other teams did.

Upper round 1 | Upper final
Winners to page playoff
New Brunswick | 5
Alberta (Host) | 4
New Brunswick | 6
British Columbia | 5
British Columbia | 8
Manitoba | 4
To page playoff
Lower round 1 | Lower final
Loser eliminated
Winner to page playoff | Alberta (Host) | 8
Alberta (Host) | 7 | Northern Ontario | 9
Manitoba | 8

=== Page playoffs ===
Page playoff system
1 | New Brunswick | 7
2 | British Columbia | 6
3 | Manitoba | 5
4 | Northern Ontario | 7

Semifinal
2 | British Columbia | 8
4 | Northern Ontario | 4

Final
1 | New Brunswick | 9
2 | British Columbia | 5

==== Final ====
April 2

| Team | 1 | 2 | 3 | 4 | 5 | 6 | 7 | 8 | 9 | 10 | Final |
|---|---|---|---|---|---|---|---|---|---|---|---|
| New Brunswick (Odishaw) | 1 | 0 | 3 | 0 | 0 | 1 | 1 | 0 | 2 | 1 | 9 |
| British Columbia (Wiltzen) | 0 | 2 | 0 | 1 | 1 | 0 | 0 | 1 | 0 | 0 | 5 |
