= 2001 Canadian Mixed Curling Championship =

- Host city: Weyburn, Saskatchewan
- Arena: The Colosseum
- Dates: January 6–14
- Attendance: 20,340
- Winner: Quebec
- Curling club: Boucherville Curling Club, Boucherville, Quebec
- Skip: Jean-Michel Ménard
- Third: Jessica Marchand
- Second: Marco Berthelot
- Lead: Joëlle Sabourin
- Finalist: Nova Scotia (Mark Dacey)

The 2001 Canadian Mixed Curling Championship was held January 6–14 at The Colosseum in Weyburn, Saskatchewan.

== Teams ==
Province / Territory	Skip	Third	Second	Lead
Alberta	Kurt Balderston	Renee Sonnenberg	Les Sonnenberg	Karen McNamee
British Columbia	Wes Craig	Roselyn Craig	Randy Thiessen	Cheryl Noble
Manitoba	Brian Pallister	Chris Scalena	Dale Michie	Rose Neufeld
New Brunswick	Russ Howard	Nancy Toner	Wayne Tallon	Wendy Howard
Newfoundland	Tony Power	Thelma Stockley	Jerry Osmond	Shirley Down
Northern Ontario	Rick Stewart	Valerie MacInnes	Neil MacInnes	Marianne Kentish
Nova Scotia	Mark Dacey	Heather Smith-Dacey	Rob Harris	Laine Peters
Ontario	Howard Rajala	Darcie Simpson	Chris Fulton	Linda Fulton
Prince Edward Island	John Likely	Kathie Gallant	Mark Butler	Krista Cameron
Quebec	Jean-Michel Menard	Jessica Marchand	Marco Berthelot	Joelle Sabourin
Saskatchewan	Scott Coghlan	Kim Hodson	Murray Humble	Laurie Secord-Humble
Yukon/Northwest Territories	Orest Peech	Wendy Hales	Bob Chambers	Corinne Delaire

== Standings ==
Locale	Skip	W	L
Quebec	Jean-Michel Ménard	7	4
Prince Edward Island	John Likely	7	4
Nova Scotia	Mark Dacey	7	4
Alberta	Kurt Balderston	7	4
Ontario	Howard Rajala	7	4
British Columbia	Wes Craig	7	4
Saskatchewan	Scott Coghlan	7	4
Northern Ontario	Rick Stewart	5	6
New Brunswick	Russ Howard	5	6
Yukon/Northwest Territories	Orest Peech	4	7
Manitoba	Brian Pallister	3	8
Newfoundland	Tony Power	0	11

== Results ==
=== Draw 1 ===
Sheet A	1	2	3	4	5	6	7	8	9	10	Final
Nova Scotia (Dacey) 🔨	4	0	0	2	1	0	3	X	X	X	10
Newfoundland (Power)	0	1	0	0	0	0	0	X	X	X	1

Sheet B	1	2	3	4	5	6	7	8	9	10	Final
New Brunswick (Howard)	0	1	0	1	0	1	0	0	1	X	4
Saskatchewan (Coghlan) 🔨	1	0	2	0	0	0	1	2	0	X	6

Sheet C	1	2	3	4	5	6	7	8	9	10	Final
Prince Edward Island (Likely)	0	0	1	0	2	1	0	2	0	0	6
Quebec (Menard) 🔨	0	3	0	2	0	0	1	0	0	1	7

Sheet D	1	2	3	4	5	6	7	8	9	10	Final
Ontario (Rajala)	0	1	0	1	0	1	0	1	0	1	5
Alberta (Balderston) 🔨	1	0	4	0	0	0	1	0	0	0	6

=== Draw 2 ===
Sheet A	1	2	3	4	5	6	7	8	9	10	Final
Quebec (Menard) 🔨	4	0	1	5	0	2	X	X	X	X	12
Ontario (Rajala)	0	1	0	0	2	0	X	X	X	X	3

Sheet B	1	2	3	4	5	6	7	8	9	10	Final
Yukon/Northwest Territories (Peech) 🔨	1	0	2	0	2	0	0	2	5	X	12
Manitoba (Pallister)	0	1	0	4	0	0	0	0	0	X	5

Sheet C	1	2	3	4	5	6	7	8	9	10	Final
British Columbia (Craig) 🔨	0	2	0	1	0	3	0	1	0	X	7
Northern Ontario (Stewart)	0	0	0	0	2	0	1	0	1	X	4

Sheet D	1	2	3	4	5	6	7	8	9	10	Final
Nova Scotia (Dacey) 🔨	1	0	1	0	1	0	0	2	0	1	6
Saskatchewan (Coghlan)	0	1	0	0	0	2	1	0	1	0	5

=== Draw 3 ===
Sheet B	1	2	3	4	5	6	7	8	9	10	Final
British Columbia (Criag) 🔨	1	0	0	0	1	0	2	0	1	1	6
Prince Edward Island (Likely)	0	0	2	2	0	2	0	1	0	0	7

Sheet C	1	2	3	4	5	6	7	8	9	10	Final
Alberta (Balderston) 🔨	1	0	0	0	1	0	0	0	1	0	3
Nova Scotia (Dacey)	0	1	0	1	0	0	0	1	0	1	4

=== Draw 4 ===
Sheet A	1	2	3	4	5	6	7	8	9	10	Final
Yukon/Northwest Territories (Peech) 🔨	1	2	0	0	0	2	0	0	0	X	5
British Columbia (Craig)	0	0	2	1	2	0	0	2	2	X	9

Sheet B	1	2	3	4	5	6	7	8	9	10	Final
Northern Ontario (Stewart) 🔨	2	0	0	1	0	2	1	0	0	1	7
Quebec (Menard)	0	2	0	0	1	0	0	2	1	0	6

Sheet C	1	2	3	4	5	6	7	8	9	10	Final
Saskatchewan (Coghlan) 🔨	0	1	0	1	0	0	5	X	X	X	7
Manitoba (Pallister)	0	0	0	0	0	1	0	X	X	X	1

Sheet D	1	2	3	4	5	6	7	8	9	10	Final
Newfoundland (Power) 🔨	0	1	0	0	1	0	2	0	X	X	4
New Brunswick (Howard)	1	0	1	2	0	2	0	3	X	X	9

=== Draw 5 ===
Sheet A	1	2	3	4	5	6	7	8	9	10	Final
Prince Edward Island (Likely) 🔨	1	0	0	0	0	2	0	1	0	X	4
Alberta (Balderston)	0	1	0	0	2	0	1	0	3	X	7

Sheet B	1	2	3	4	5	6	7	8	9	10	Final
Ontario (Rajala) 🔨	1	2	0	0	4	0	0	4	X	X	11
Newfoundland (Power)	0	0	1	1	0	1	0	0	X	X	3

Sheet C	1	2	3	4	5	6	7	8	9	10	Final
New Brunswick (Howard) 🔨	3	4	0	1	1	2	X	X	X	X	11
Yukon/Northwest Territories (Peech)	0	0	1	0	0	0	X	X	X	X	1

Sheet D	1	2	3	4	5	6	7	8	9	10	Final
Manitoba (Pallister) 🔨	1	0	1	1	0	2	0	1	0	1	7
Northern Ontario (Stewart)	0	2	0	0	2	0	1	0	1	0	6

=== Draw 6 ===
Sheet A	1	2	3	4	5	6	7	8	9	10	Final
Newfoundland (Power) 🔨	1	0	0	1	1	2	0	0	0	0	5
Quebec (Menard)	0	1	0	0	0	0	1	2	2	3	9

Sheet B	1	2	3	4	5	6	7	8	9	10	Final
Saskatchewan (Coghlan) 🔨	1	0	1	0	3	0	1	0	0	1	7
Yukon/Northwest Territories (Peech)	0	1	0	1	0	1	0	1	1	0	5

Sheet C	1	2	3	4	5	6	7	8	9	10	Final
Northern Ontario (Stewart) 🔨	2	0	0	3	0	4	0	0	0	0	9
Prince Edward Island (Likely)	0	2	0	0	2	0	1	1	1	1	8

Sheet D	1	2	3	4	5	6	7	8	9	10	Final
Alberta (Balderston) 🔨	2	1	0	1	0	0	0	2	0	0	6
British Columbia (Craig)	0	0	1	0	2	0	0	0	2	2	7

=== Draw 7 ===
Sheet A	1	2	3	4	5	6	7	8	9	10	Final
British Columbia (Craig) 🔨	2	0	1	0	0	0	0	2	0	X	5
Nova Scotia (Dacey)	0	2	0	0	3	2	1	0	2	X	10

Sheet B	1	2	3	4	5	6	7	8	9	10	Final
Manitoba (Pallister) 🔨	1	0	0	0	3	0	0	4	0	0	8
Alberta (Balderston)	0	1	1	0	0	1	1	0	2	1	7

Sheet C	1	2	3	4	5	6	7	8	9	10	Final
Quebec (Menard) 🔨	0	3	0	1	0	0	0	2	0	1	7
Saskatchewan (Coghlan)	0	0	1	0	1	1	1	0	1	0	5

Sheet D	1	2	3	4	5	6	7	8	9	10	Final
New Brunswick (Howard) 🔨	0	0	0	0	X	X	X	X	X	X	0
Ontario (Rajala)	0	1	4	3	X	X	X	X	X	X	8

=== Draw 8 ===
Sheet A	1	2	3	4	5	6	7	8	9	10	Final
Ontario (Rajala) 🔨	2	0	0	3	0	4	0	1	1	X	11
Northern Ontario (Stewart)	0	0	1	0	2	0	2	0	0	X	5

Sheet B	1	2	3	4	5	6	7	8	9	10	Final
Prince Edward Island (Likely) 🔨	5	1	2	0	1	0	0	0	X	X	9
New Brunswick (Howard)	0	0	0	2	0	2	0	0	X	X	4

Sheet C	1	2	3	4	5	6	7	8	9	10	Final
Nova Scotia (Dacey) 🔨	1	2	3	0	0	0	3	X	X	X	9
Manitoba (Pallister)	0	0	0	2	0	1	0	X	X	X	3

Sheet D	1	2	3	4	5	6	7	8	9	10	Final
Yukon/Northwest Territories (Peech) 🔨	2	0	4	2	1	0	2	1	X	X	12
Newfoundland (Power)	0	3	0	0	0	3	0	0	X	X	6

=== Draw 9 ===
Sheet A	1	2	3	4	5	6	7	8	9	10	Final
Nova Scotia (Dacey) 🔨	0	1	0	1	0	3	1	0	0	1	7
New Brunswick (Howard)	1	0	1	0	1	0	0	3	0	0	6

Sheet B	1	2	3	4	5	6	7	8	9	10	Final
Alberta (Balderston) 🔨	3	1	0	1	1	0	3	X	X	X	9
Northern Ontario (Stewart)	0	0	0	0	0	3	0	X	X	X	3

Sheet C	1	2	3	4	5	6	7	8	9	10	Final
Saskatchewan (Coghlan) 🔨	4	1	1	1	1	X	X	X	X	X	8
Newfoundland (Power)	0	0	0	0	0	X	X	X	X	X	0

Sheet D	1	2	3	4	5	6	7	8	9	10	Final
Ontario (Rajala) 🔨	2	1	0	2	1	0	1	0	2	X	9
Manitoba (Pallister)	0	0	2	0	0	1	0	1	0	X	4

=== Draw 10 ===
Sheet A	1	2	3	4	5	6	7	8	9	10	11	Final
Northern Ontario (Stewart) 🔨	0	2	0	0	1	1	0	2	0	2	0	8
Yukon/Northwest Territories (Peech)	1	0	3	1	0	0	1	0	2	0	1	9

Sheet B	1	2	3	4	5	6	7	8	9	10	11	Final
New Brunswick (Howard) 🔨	1	0	0	0	0	1	0	2	0	1	1	6
Quebec (Menard)	0	0	1	1	1	0	2	0	0	0	0	5

Sheet C	1	2	3	4	5	6	7	8	9	10	11	Final
Manitoba (Pallister) 🔨	0	2	0	2	0	1	0	0	0	0	0	5
British Columbia (Craig)	0	0	1	0	1	0	0	2	0	1	1	6

Sheet D	1	2	3	4	5	6	7	8	9	10	Final
Newfoundland (Power) 🔨	1	1	0	3	0	0	2	0	1	X	8
Prince Edward Island (Likely)	0	0	3	0	2	2	0	3	0	X	10

=== Draw 11 ===
Sheet A	1	2	3	4	5	6	7	8	9	10	Final
Quebec (Menard) 🔨	1	0	1	0	0	1	1	0	0	0	4
Alberta (Balderston)	0	2	0	1	0	0	0	1	1	3	8

Sheet B	1	2	3	4	5	6	7	8	9	10	Final
Yukon/Northwest Territories (Peech) 🔨	0	2	0	1	0	0	1	0	1	0	5
Nova Scotia (Dacey)	0	0	3	0	1	1	0	1	0	2	8

Sheet C	1	2	3	4	5	6	7	8	9	10	Final
Prince Edward Island (Likely) 🔨	0	1	0	1	0	0	1	0	4	1	8
Ontario (Rajala)	0	0	1	0	0	2	0	2	0	0	5

Sheet D	1	2	3	4	5	6	7	8	9	10	Final
British Columbia (Craig) 🔨	2	0	0	0	1	0	1	0	0	1	5
Saskatchewan (Coghlan)	0	2	0	0	0	0	0	1	1	0	4

=== Draw 12 ===
Sheet A	1	2	3	4	5	6	7	8	9	10	Final
Saskatchewan (Coghlan) 🔨	2	0	0	0	0	0	1	0	0	X	3
Ontario (Rajala)	0	1	0	1	1	1	0	0	2	X	6

Sheet B	1	2	3	4	5	6	7	8	9	10	Final
Newfoundland (Power) 🔨	0	1	3	0	0	0	1	0	X	X	5
Manitoba (Pallister)	1	0	0	3	1	3	0	3	X	X	11

Sheet C	1	2	3	4	5	6	7	8	9	10	Final
New Brunswick (Howard) 🔨	2	0	0	1	0	0	1	0	1	0	5
Northern Ontario (Stewart)	0	2	0	0	1	1	0	1	0	1	6

Sheet D	1	2	3	4	5	6	7	8	9	10	Final
Quebec (Menard) 🔨	1	2	0	3	2	0	2	0	X	X	10
Yukon/Northwest Territories (Peech)	0	0	1	0	0	3	0	0	X	X	4

=== Draw 13 ===
Sheet A	1	2	3	4	5	6	7	8	9	10	Final
Manitoba (Pallister) 🔨	2	1	0	1	0	1	0	1	0	X	6
Prince Edward Island (Likely)	0	0	3	0	3	0	1	0	2	X	9

Sheet B	1	2	3	4	5	6	7	8	9	10	Final
Ontario (Rajala) 🔨	1	0	0	1	1	0	0	0	1	X	4
British Columbia (Craig)	0	0	0	0	0	1	0	1	0	X	2

Sheet C	1	2	3	4	5	6	7	8	9	10	Final
Yukon/Northwest Territories (Peech) 🔨	1	1	0	1	0	0	2	0	1	0	6
Alberta (Balderston)	0	0	1	0	2	1	0	3	0	0	7

Sheet D	1	2	3	4	5	6	7	8	9	10	Final
Northern Ontario (Stewart) 🔨	0	0	3	1	3	0	0	0	0	1	8
Nova Scotia (Dacey)	0	1	0	0	0	3	1	1	1	0	7

=== Draw 14 ===
Sheet A	1	2	3	4	5	6	7	8	9	10	Final
British Columbia (Craig) 🔨	2	0	1	3	1	3	X	X	X	X	10
Newfoundland (Power)	0	1	0	0	0	0	X	X	X	X	1

Sheet B	1	2	3	4	5	6	7	8	9	10	Final
Prince Edward Island (Likely) 🔨	2	0	0	1	1	0	0	1	0	X	5
Saskatchewan (Coghlan)	0	3	1	0	0	0	2	0	1	X	7

Sheet C	1	2	3	4	5	6	7	8	9	10	Final
Nova Scotia (Dacey) 🔨	0	0	0	2	0	0	1	0	X	X	3
Quebec (Menard)	1	0	0	0	1	2	0	4	X	X	8

Sheet D	1	2	3	4	5	6	7	8	9	10	Final
Alberta (Balderston) 🔨	0	2	0	0	0	2	0	0	3	X	7
New Brunswick (Howard)	1	0	2	0	1	0	0	0	0	X	4

=== Draw 15 ===
Sheet A	1	2	3	4	5	6	7	8	9	10	11	Final
New Brunswick (Howard) 🔨	2	0	1	0	3	0	0	3	0	0	3	12
Manitoba (Pallister)	0	1	0	2	0	1	2	0	2	1	0	9

Sheet B	1	2	3	4	5	6	7	8	9	10	Final
Quebec (Menard) 🔨	0	1	0	0	2	0	1	1	0	0	5
British Columbia (Craig)	1	0	0	3	0	1	0	0	2	2	9

Sheet C	1	2	3	4	5	6	7	8	9	10	Final
Ontario (Rajala) 🔨	0	1	0	2	1	0	2	0	0	X	6
Yukon/Northwest Territories (Peech)	1	0	2	0	0	2	0	4	1	X	10

Sheet D	1	2	3	4	5	6	7	8	9	10	Final
Prince Edward Island (Likely) 🔨	2	0	0	1	0	2	0	0	0	2	7
Nova Scotia (Dacey)	0	3	0	0	1	0	1	1	0	0	6

=== Draw 16 ===
Sheet A	1	2	3	4	5	6	7	8	9	10	11	Final
Yukon/Northwest Territories (Peech) 🔨	0	0	2	0	2	0	1	0	1	0	0	6
Prince Edward Island (Likely)	0	0	0	1	0	1	0	1	0	3	1	7

Sheet B	1	2	3	4	5	6	7	8	9	10	Final
Nova Scotia (Dacey) 🔨	0	2	0	1	0	2	0	3	0	0	8
Ontario (Rajala)	0	0	1	0	2	0	4	0	0	2	9

Sheet C	1	2	3	4	5	6	7	8	9	10	Final
Newfoundland (Power) 🔨	0	0	0	2	0	0	1	1	0	X	4
Alberta (Balderston)	0	1	1	0	4	1	0	0	1	X	8

Sheet D	1	2	3	4	5	6	7	8	9	10	Final
Saskatchewan (Coghlan) 🔨	2	0	2	0	1	1	1	0	1	X	8
Northern Ontario (Stewart)	0	1	0	1	0	0	0	1	0	X	3

=== Draw 17 ===
Sheet A	1	2	3	4	5	6	7	8	9	10	Final
Alberta (Balderston) 🔨	2	0	0	0	0	0	1	0	0	X	3
Saskatchewan (Coghlan)	0	2	0	0	1	1	0	0	3	X	7

Sheet B	1	2	3	4	5	6	7	8	9	10	Final
Northern Ontario (Stewart) 🔨	0	2	0	0	3	1	1	1	X	X	8
Newfoundland (Power)	0	0	1	0	0	0	0	0	X	X	1

Sheet C	1	2	3	4	5	6	7	8	9	10	Final
British Columbia (Craig) 🔨	0	1	0	0	0	1	0	2	0	X	4
New Brunswick (Howard)	1	0	1	1	0	0	3	0	1	X	7

Sheet D	1	2	3	4	5	6	7	8	9	10	Final
Manitoba (Pallister) 🔨	0	0	0	0	1	0	1	X	X	X	2
Quebec (Menard)	1	2	2	1	0	3	0	X	X	X	9

== Tiebreakers ==
=== Tiebreaker #1 ===
Sheet A	1	2	3	4	5	6	7	8	9	10	11	Final
Saskatchewan (Coghlan) 🔨	0	0	0	1	1	1	1	1	0	0	1	6
Alberta (Balderston)	0	0	1	0	0	0	0	0	3	1	0	5

Player percentages
Saskatchewan		Alberta	
Leah Birnie	81%	Karen McNamee	72%
Murray Humble	81%	Les Sonnenberg	80%
Laurie Secord-Humble	72%	Renee Sonnenberg	88%
Scott Coghlan	75%	Kurt Balderston	67%
Total	77%	Total	76%

Sheet D	1	2	3	4	5	6	7	8	9	10	Final
British Columbia (Craig) 🔨	0	0	0	0	1	0	X	X	X	X	1
Ontario (Rajala)	2	0	1	1	0	3	X	X	X	X	7

Player percentages
British Columbia		Ontario	
Cheryl Noble	69%	Linda Fulton	79%
Randy Thiessen	79%	Chris Fulton	71%
Roselyn Craig	67%	Darcie Simpson	83%
Wes Craig	56%	Howard Rajala	85%
Total	68%	Total	80%

=== Tiebreaker #2 ===
Sheet C	1	2	3	4	5	6	7	8	9	10	Final
Saskatchewan (Coghlan) 🔨	2	0	2	0	0	1	0	1	1	X	7
Ontario (Rajala)	0	2	0	1	0	0	1	0	0	X	4

Player percentages
Saskatchewan		Ontario	
Leah Birnie	46%	Linda Fulton	69%
Murray Humble	65%	Chris Fulton	76%
Laurie Secord-Humble	74%	Darcie Simpson	73%
Scott Coghlan	79%	Howard Rajala	58%
Total	66%	Total	69%

== Playoffs ==
Page playoff system
1	Prince Edward Island	3
2	Quebec	7
3	Saskatchewan	5
4	Nova Scotia	7

Semifinal
1	Prince Edward Island	4
4	Nova Scotia	6

Final
2	Quebec	5
4	Nova Scotia	4

=== 1 vs. 2 ===
Sheet C	1	2	3	4	5	6	7	8	9	10	Final
Prince Edward Island (Likely) 🔨	0	2	0	0	1	0	0	0	0	X	3
Quebec (Menard)	2	0	0	2	0	0	0	3	0	X	7

Player percentages
Prince Edward Island		Quebec	
Krista Cameron	74%	Joelle Sabourin	59%
Mark Butler	71%	Marco Berthelot	79%
Kathie Gallant	51%	Jessica Marchand	60%
John Likely	56%	Jean-Michel Menard	69%
Total	63%	Total	67%

=== 3 vs. 4 ===
Sheet C	1	2	3	4	5	6	7	8	9	10	Final
Saskatchewan (Coghlan) 🔨	0	1	0	0	2	0	0	0	2	0	5
Nova Scotia (Dacey)	1	0	0	2	0	1	0	1	0	2	7

Player percentages
Saskatchewan		Nova Scotia	
Leah Birnie	88%	Laine Peters	65%
Murray Humble	81%	Rob Harris	81%
Laurie Secord-Humble	76%	Heather Smith-Dacey	85%
Scott Coghlan	79%	Mark Dacey	75%
Total	81%	Total	77%

=== Semifinal ===
Sheet B	1	2	3	4	5	6	7	8	9	10	11	Final
Prince Edward Island (Likely) 🔨	0	1	0	1	0	1	0	0	0	1	0	4
Nova Scotia (Dacey)	0	0	2	0	1	0	0	1	0	0	2	6

Player percentages
Prince Edward Island		Nova Scotia	
Krista Cameron	84%	Laine Peters	89%
Mark Butler	76%	Rob Harris	88%
Kathie Gallant	84%	Heather Smith-Dacey	82%
John Likely	81%	Mark Dacey	85%
Total	81%	Total	86%

=== Final ===
Sheet B	1	2	3	4	5	6	7	8	9	10	Final
Quebec (Menard) 🔨	1	0	1	0	0	0	1	0	1	1	5
Nova Scotia (Dacey)	0	1	0	1	0	1	0	1	0	0	4

Player percentages
Quebec		Nova Scotia	
Joelle Sabourin	80%	Laine Peters	81%
Marco Berthelot	68%	Rob Harris	73%
Jessica Marchand	81%	Heather Smith-Dacey	71%
Jean-Michel Menard	84%	Mark Dacey	89%
Total	78%	Total	78%
