= 2000 Canadian Mixed Curling Championship =

- Host city: Lethbridge, Alberta
- Arena: Lethbridge Curling Club
- Dates: January 8–16
- Winner: Alberta
- Curling club: Calgary Curling Club, Calgary
- Skip: Kevin Koe
- Third: Susan O'Connor
- Second: Greg Northcott
- Lead: Lawnie Goodfellow
- Finalist: Saskatchewan (Jim Packet)

The 2000 Canadian Mixed Curling Championship was held January 8–16 at the Lethbridge Curling Club in Lethbridge, Alberta.

== Teams ==
Province / Territory	Skip	Third	Second	Lead
Alberta	Kevin Koe	Susan O'Connor	Greg Northcott	Lawnie Goodfellow
British Columbia	Craig Lepine	Karen Lepine	Tony Tuson	Jacalyn Brown
Manitoba	Doug Harrison	Lori Boudreau	Terry McRae	Allyson Stewart
New Brunswick	Russ Howard	Nancy Toner	Wayne Tallon	Wendy Howard
Newfoundland	Gary Rowe	Diane Ryan	Neal Blackmore	Jennifer Day
Northern Ontario	Tim Phillips	Dawn Schwar	Doug Hong	Margy Goldsborough
Nova Scotia	Mark Dacey	Heather Smith-Dacey	Rob Harris	Laine Peters
Ontario	Dale Kelly	Julie Kelly	Shawn Hartle	Becky Philpott
Prince Edward Island	John Likely	Susan McInnis	Mark Butler	Nancy Cameron
Quebec	Jean-Michel Menard	Stephanie Marchand	Marco Berthelot	Jessica Marchand
Saskatchewan	Jim Packet	Brenda Lee Malaryk	Dallas Duce	Audrey Dubiel
Yukon	Ron Cook	Terry Allen	Tim Garrett	Carol Bennett

== Standings ==
Locale	Skip	W	L
Alberta	Kevin Koe	8	3
Saskatchewan	Jim Packet	7	4
New Brunswick	Russ Howard	7	4
Quebec	Jean-Michel Menard	6	5
Ontario	Dale Kelly	6	5
British Columbia	Craig Lepine	6	5
Prince Edward Island	John Likely	6	5
Northern Ontario	Tim Phillips	6	5
Nova Scotia	Mark Dacey	5	6
Manitoba	Doug Harrison	4	7
Yukon/Northwest Territories	Ron Cook	3	8
Newfoundland	Gary Rowe	2	9

== Results ==
=== Draw 1 ===
Sheet A	1	2	3	4	5	6	7	8	9	10	Final
Yukon/Northwest Territories (Cook)	0	0	0	1	0	1	0	0	0	X	2
Saskatchewan (Packet) 🔨	0	0	2	0	1	0	2	1	1	X	7

Sheet B	1	2	3	4	5	6	7	8	9	10	Final
Ontario (Kelly)	0	0	0	2	0	1	0	2	0	2	7
Alberta (Koe) 🔨	1	1	1	0	1	0	1	0	0	0	5

Sheet C	1	2	3	4	5	6	7	8	9	10	Final
New Brunswick (Howard) 🔨	3	1	0	3	0	0	0	1	1	X	9
Nova Scotia (Dacey)	0	0	1	0	1	1	1	0	0	X	4

Sheet D	1	2	3	4	5	6	7	8	9	10	Final
Northern Ontario (Phillips) 🔨	2	0	0	1	0	0	1	0	0	2	6
Prince Edward Island (Likely)	0	0	2	0	1	0	0	0	1	0	4

=== Draw 2 ===
Sheet A	1	2	3	4	5	6	7	8	9	10	Final
Nova Scotia (Dacey) 🔨	1	0	1	3	0	0	3	0	3	X	11
Northern Ontario (Phillips)	0	2	0	0	0	1	0	2	0	X	5

Sheet B	1	2	3	4	5	6	7	8	9	10	Final
Newfoundland (Rowe) 🔨	0	0	2	1	1	1	0	1	0	X	6
Manitoba (Harrison)	0	0	0	0	0	0	2	0	2	X	4

Sheet C	1	2	3	4	5	6	7	8	9	10	Final
Quebec (Menard) 🔨	1	0	1	1	0	2	0	0	1	0	6
British Columbia (Lepine)	0	2	0	0	3	0	2	0	0	1	8

Sheet D	1	2	3	4	5	6	7	8	9	10	Final
Yukon//Northwest Territories (Cook) 🔨	0	1	0	1	0	2	0	1	0	X	5
Alberta (Koe)	2	0	2	0	3	0	2	0	0	X	9

=== Draw 3 ===
Sheet B	1	2	3	4	5	6	7	8	9	10	Final
Quebec (Menard) 🔨	3	0	0	0	1	0	1	0	0	X	5
New Brunswick (Howard)	0	2	1	1	0	2	0	1	1	X	8

Sheet C	1	2	3	4	5	6	7	8	9	10	Final
Prince Edward Island (Likely) 🔨	3	0	0	1	0	0	1	1	0	0	6
Yukon/Northwest Territories (Cook)	0	2	1	0	1	1	0	0	1	1	7

=== Draw 4 ===
Sheet A	1	2	3	4	5	6	7	8	9	10	Final
Newfoundland (Rowe) 🔨	0	0	1	1	0	0	0	X	X	X	2
Quebec (Menard)	1	1	0	0	1	1	5	X	X	X	9

Sheet B	1	2	3	4	5	6	7	8	9	10	11	Final
British Columbia (Lepine) 🔨	1	0	0	2	0	2	0	1	0	0	1	7
Nova Scotia (Dacey)	0	3	0	0	2	0	0	0	0	1	0	6

Sheet C	1	2	3	4	5	6	7	8	9	10	11	Final
Alberta (Koe) 🔨	0	0	0	2	1	0	0	1	1	0	1	6
Manitoba (Harrison)	0	0	1	0	0	2	1	0	0	1	0	5

Sheet D	1	2	3	4	5	6	7	8	9	10	Final
Saskatchewan (Packet) 🔨	1	0	0	1	0	0	1	1	1	0	5
Ontario (Kelly)	0	0	2	0	1	0	0	0	0	0	3

=== Draw 5 ===
Sheet A	1	2	3	4	5	6	7	8	9	10	Final
New Brunswick (Howard) 🔨	0	0	0	1	0	1	0	1	1	0	4
Prince Edward Island (Likely)	1	0	1	0	2	0	3	0	0	0	7

Sheet B	1	2	3	4	5	6	7	8	9	10	Final
Northern Ontario (Phillips) 🔨	1	0	0	0	3	1	0	0	0	1	6
Saskatchewan (Packet)	0	0	0	1	0	0	2	1	1	0	5

Sheet C	1	2	3	4	5	6	7	8	9	10	Final
Ontario (Kelly) 🔨	3	0	0	1	0	1	1	2	X	X	8
Newfoundland (Rowe)	0	1	1	0	1	0	0	0	X	X	3

Sheet D	1	2	3	4	5	6	7	8	9	10	Final
Manitoba (Harrison) 🔨	0	0	0	0	1	0	0	1	0	0	2
British Columbia (Lepine)	0	0	1	0	0	1	1	0	1	2	6

=== Draw 6 ===
Sheet A	1	2	3	4	5	6	7	8	9	10	Final
Saskatchewan (Packet) 🔨	0	1	0	1	0	1	0	0	0	X	3
Nova Scotia (Dacey)	1	0	1	0	1	0	2	1	2	X	8

Sheet B	1	2	3	4	5	6	7	8	9	10	Final
Alberta (Koe) 🔨	1	0	2	0	1	0	2	2	0	X	8
Newfoundland (Rowe)	0	1	0	2	0	1	0	0	0	X	4

Sheet C	1	2	3	4	5	6	7	8	9	10	Final
British Columbia (Lepine) 🔨	0	1	0	0	2	0	1	0	2	0	6
New Brunswick (Howard)	1	0	2	0	0	1	0	2	0	2	8

Sheet D	1	2	3	4	5	6	7	8	9	10	11	Final
Prince Edward Island (Likely) 🔨	0	2	0	1	0	2	0	0	2	0	1	8
Quebec (Menard)	0	0	1	0	2	0	3	0	0	1	0	7

=== Draw 7 ===
Sheet A	1	2	3	4	5	6	7	8	9	10	Final
Quebec (Menard) 🔨	0	0	1	0	3	0	0	2	0	0	6
Yukon/Northwest Territories (Cook)	0	0	0	1	0	1	0	0	2	1	5

Sheet B	1	2	3	4	5	6	7	8	9	10	11	Final
Manitoba (Harrison) 🔨	0	1	0	1	0	1	2	0	1	0	1	7
Prince Edward Island (Likely)	0	0	2	0	2	0	0	1	0	1	0	6

Sheet C	1	2	3	4	5	6	7	8	9	10	Final
Nova Scotia (Dacey) 🔨	0	1	0	0	2	0	0	0	1	0	4
Alberta (Koe)	0	0	0	1	0	2	0	1	0	1	5

Sheet D	1	2	3	4	5	6	7	8	9	10	11	Final
Ontario (Kelly) 🔨	0	0	1	0	3	0	1	1	0	0	1	7
Northern Ontario (Phillips)	1	0	0	1	0	2	0	0	0	2	0	6

=== Draw 8 ===
Sheet A	1	2	3	4	5	6	7	8	9	10	11	Final
Northern Ontario (Phillips) 🔨	1	0	2	1	0	0	0	3	0	0	1	8
British Columbia (Lepine)	0	1	0	0	2	0	0	0	0	4	0	7

Sheet B	1	2	3	4	5	6	7	8	9	10	Final
New Brunswick (Howard) 🔨	1	0	0	2	0	2	0	1	1	X	7
Ontario (Kelly)	0	0	0	0	3	0	1	0	0	X	4

Sheet C	1	2	3	4	5	6	7	8	9	10	Final
Yukon/Northwest Territories (Cook) 🔨	0	1	0	0	0	0	2	0	X	X	3
Manitoba (Harrison)	1	0	2	0	2	1	0	1	X	X	7

Sheet D	1	2	3	4	5	6	7	8	9	10	11	Final
Newfoundland (Rowe) 🔨	1	0	0	1	0	1	0	0	0	1	0	4
Saskatchewan (Packet)	0	1	0	0	1	0	2	0	0	0	1	5

=== Draw 9 ===
Sheet A	1	2	3	4	5	6	7	8	9	10	Final
Yukon/Northwest Territories (Cook) 🔨	0	0	2	0	1	1	0	0	0	0	4
Ontario (Kelly)	0	1	0	1	0	0	3	0	1	3	9

Sheet B	1	2	3	4	5	6	7	8	9	10	Final
Prince Edward Island (Likely) 🔨	1	1	1	0	1	0	0	1	0	0	5
British Columbia (Lepine)	0	0	0	1	0	1	2	0	1	1	6

Sheet C	1	2	3	4	5	6	7	8	9	10	Final
Alberta (Koe) 🔨	0	0	2	0	0	0	4	0	0	1	7
Saskatchewan (Packet)	1	0	0	0	1	1	0	2	0	0	5

Sheet D	1	2	3	4	5	6	7	8	9	10	11	Final
Northern Ontario (Phillips) 🔨	0	2	0	1	0	0	2	0	0	1	1	7
Manitoba (Harrison)	0	0	2	0	2	1	0	1	0	0	0	6

=== Draw 10 ===
Sheet A	1	2	3	4	5	6	7	8	9	10	Final
British Columbia (Kuhn) 🔨	0	2	0	0	2	0	2	0	2	X	8
Newfoundland (Rowe)	0	0	1	0	0	1	0	2	0	X	4

Sheet B	1	2	3	4	5	6	7	8	9	10	Final
Ontario (Kelly) 🔨	2	1	0	0	0	1	0	0	1	0	5
Nova Scotia (Dacey)	0	0	1	1	2	0	0	1	0	1	6

Sheet C	1	2	3	4	5	6	7	8	9	10	Final
Manitoba (Harrison) 🔨	2	0	1	2	2	3	X	X	X	X	10
Quebec (Menard)	0	2	0	0	0	0	X	X	X	X	2

Sheet D	1	2	3	4	5	6	7	8	9	10	Final
Saskatchewan (Packet) 🔨	0	0	2	0	2	2	3	X	X	X	9
New Brunswick (Howard)	0	0	0	2	0	0	0	X	X	X	2

=== Draw 11 ===
Sheet A	1	2	3	4	5	6	7	8	9	10	Final
Nova Scotia (Dacey) 🔨	0	0	0	2	0	0	2	0	0	0	4
Prince Edward Island (Likely)	0	0	1	0	1	2	0	1	0	2	7

Sheet B	1	2	3	4	5	6	7	8	9	10	Final
Newfoundland (Rowe) 🔨	0	1	0	0	1	0	0	1	0	X	3
Yukon/Northwest Territories (Cook)	1	0	0	1	0	1	2	0	3	X	8

Sheet C	1	2	3	4	5	6	7	8	9	10	Final
New Brunswick (Howard) 🔨	0	2	0	1	0	1	0	0	X	X	4
Northern Ontario (Phillips)	2	0	2	0	2	0	0	4	X	X	10

Sheet D	1	2	3	4	5	6	7	8	9	10	Final
Quebec (Menard) 🔨	2	1	0	1	0	3	0	1	0	X	8
Alberta (Koe)	0	0	2	0	1	0	0	0	2	X	5

=== Draw 12 ===
Sheet A	1	2	3	4	5	6	7	8	9	10	Final
Alberta (Koe) 🔨	4	0	2	0	0	7	X	X	X	X	13
Northern Ontario (Phillips)	0	2	0	1	2	0	X	X	X	X	5

Sheet B	1	2	3	4	5	6	7	8	9	10	11	Final
Saskatchewan (Packet) 🔨	0	0	2	0	2	0	1	0	1	0	1	7
Manitoba (Harrison)	1	0	0	3	0	0	0	1	0	1	0	6

Sheet C	1	2	3	4	5	6	7	8	9	10	Final
Ontario (Kelly) 🔨	0	2	0	0	1	0	0	2	0	1	6
British Columbia (Lepine)	0	0	0	1	0	2	0	0	2	0	5

Sheet D	1	2	3	4	5	6	7	8	9	10	Final
Nova Scotia (Dacey) 🔨	0	0	0	2	0	1	0	0	X	X	3
Newfoundland (Rowe)	1	0	2	0	2	0	4	0	X	X	9

=== Draw 13 ===
Sheet A	1	2	3	4	5	6	7	8	9	10	Final
Manitoba (Harrison) 🔨	2	0	1	1	0	1	1	0	1	0	7
New Brunswick (Howard)	0	3	0	0	3	0	0	3	0	1	10

Sheet B	1	2	3	4	5	6	7	8	9	10	Final
Northern Ontario (Phillips) 🔨	0	2	0	1	0	1	0	3	0	0	7
Quebec (Menard)	3	0	1	0	1	0	1	0	1	1	8

Sheet C	1	2	3	4	5	6	7	8	9	10	Final
Newfoundland (Rowe) 🔨	0	1	1	0	1	0	0	0	1	X	4
Prince Edward Island (Likely)	0	0	0	2	0	2	1	1	0	X	6

Sheet D	1	2	3	4	5	6	7	8	9	10	Final
British Columbia (Lepine) 🔨	0	0	3	0	2	1	1	0	X	X	7
Yukon/Northwest Territories (Cook)	0	0	0	1	0	0	0	1	X	X	2

=== Draw 14 ===
Sheet A	1	2	3	4	5	6	7	8	9	10	Final
Quebec (Menard) 🔨	1	0	0	0	0	1	0	4	0	0	6
Saskatchewan (Packet)	0	0	1	0	1	0	1	0	1	1	5

Sheet B	1	2	3	4	5	6	7	8	9	10	11	Final
New Brunswick (Howard) 🔨	2	0	1	0	2	1	0	0	1	0	0	7
Alberta (Koe)	0	1	0	2	0	0	1	1	0	2	1	8

Sheet C	1	2	3	4	5	6	7	8	9	10	Final
Yukon/Northwest Territories (Cook) 🔨	3	0	0	0	0	1	0	0	1	X	5
Nova Scotia (Dacey)	0	2	1	1	1	0	3	0	0	X	8

Sheet D	1	2	3	4	5	6	7	8	9	10	Final
Prince Edward Island (Likely) 🔨	0	1	1	0	0	2	0	1	0	0	5
Ontario (Kelly)	0	0	0	1	0	0	1	0	1	1	4

=== Draw 15 ===
Sheet A	1	2	3	4	5	6	7	8	9	10	Final
Ontario (Kelly) 🔨	0	2	0	0	0	0	1	0	3	X	6
Manitoba (Harrison)	0	0	1	1	0	0	0	2	0	X	4

Sheet B	1	2	3	4	5	6	7	8	9	10	Final
Nova Scotia (Dacey) 🔨	1	0	1	2	0	2	3	X	X	X	9
Quebec (Menard)	0	0	0	0	1	0	0	X	X	X	1

Sheet C	1	2	3	4	5	6	7	8	9	10	Final
Northern Ontario (Phillips) 🔨	2	4	0	0	3	0	2	0	1	X	12
Newfoundland (Rowe)	0	0	1	1	0	3	0	2	0	X	7

Sheet D	1	2	3	4	5	6	7	8	9	10	Final
New Brunswick (Howard) 🔨	2	0	1	1	1	0	2	0	1	X	8
Yukon/Northwest Territories (Cook)	0	1	0	0	0	1	0	1	0	X	3

=== Draw 16 ===
Sheet A	1	2	3	4	5	6	7	8	9	10	Final
Newfoundland (Rowe) 🔨	0	2	1	0	1	0	0	1	1	0	6
New Brunswick (Howard)	1	0	0	3	0	0	0	0	0	3	7

Sheet B	1	2	3	4	5	6	7	8	9	10	Final
Yukon/Northwest Territories (Cook) 🔨	2	1	0	2	0	0	0	0	0	1	6
Northern Ontario (Phillips)	0	0	2	0	2	1	0	0	0	0	5

Sheet C	1	2	3	4	5	6	7	8	9	10	Final
Saskatchewan (Packet) 🔨	0	1	0	2	0	2	0	1	0	2	8
Prince Edward Island (Likely)	0	0	1	0	2	0	1	0	2	0	6

Sheet D	1	2	3	4	5	6	7	8	9	10	Final
Alberta (Koe) 🔨	2	0	0	3	0	1	1	0	1	1	9
British Columbia (Lepine)	0	3	0	0	2	0	0	1	0	0	6

=== Draw 17 ===
Sheet A	1	2	3	4	5	6	7	8	9	10	Final
Prince Edward Island (Likely) 🔨	2	0	5	2	0	0	0	0	0	1	10
Alberta (Koe)	0	2	0	0	1	1	1	1	1	0	7

Sheet B	1	2	3	4	5	6	7	8	9	10	Final
British Columbia (Lepine) 🔨	0	0	0	0	1	0	3	0	X	X	4
Saskatchewan (Packet)	0	3	1	0	0	2	0	4	X	X	10

Sheet C	1	2	3	4	5	6	7	8	9	10	Final
Quebec (Menard) 🔨	0	0	1	0	1	1	0	0	3	X	6
Ontario (Kelly)	0	1	0	2	0	0	0	1	0	X	4

Sheet D	1	2	3	4	5	6	7	8	9	10	11	Final
Manitoba (Harrison) 🔨	1	0	2	0	0	2	0	3	0	0	3	11
Nova Scotia (Dacey)	0	2	0	3	1	0	1	0	0	1	0	8

== Tiebreakers ==
=== Tiebreaker #1 ===
Sheet C	1	2	3	4	5	6	7	8	9	10	Final
Northern Ontario (Phillips)	0	0	1	0	1	0	1	0	X	X	3
British Columbia (Lepine) 🔨	5	1	0	1	0	1	0	1	X	X	9

Player percentages
Northern Ontario		British Columbia	
Margy Goldsborough	80%	Jacalyn Brown	69%
Doug Hong	88%	Tony Tuson	92%
Dawn Schwar	83%	Karen Lepine	83%
Tim Phillips	78%	Craig Lepine	91%
Total	82%	Total	84%

=== Tiebreaker #2 ===
Sheet A	1	2	3	4	5	6	7	8	9	10	Final
British Columbia (Lepine)	0	1	0	0	0	1	0	0	2	X	4
Prince Edward Island (Likely) 🔨	1	0	1	0	0	0	3	1	0	X	6

Player percentages
British Columbia		Prince Edward Island	
Jacalyn Brown	90%	Nancy Cameron	89%
Tony Tuson	75%	Mark Butler	80%
Karen Lepine	80%	Susan McInnis	93%
Craig Lepine	82%	John Likely	93%
Total	82%	Total	89%

Sheet D	1	2	3	4	5	6	7	8	9	10	11	Final
Quebec (Menard) 🔨	1	0	2	1	0	1	0	0	0	0	0	5
Ontario (Kelly)	0	2	0	0	2	0	1	0	0	0	1	6

Player percentages
Quebec		Ontario	
Jessica Marchand	85%	Becky Philpott	88%
Marco Berthelot	76%	Shawn Hartle	78%
Stephanie Marchand	84%	Julie Kelly	81%
Jean-Michel Menard	74%	Dale Kelly	82%
Total	80%	Total	82%

=== Tiebreaker #3 ===
Sheet C	1	2	3	4	5	6	7	8	9	10	Final
Prince Edward Island (Likely) 🔨	2	0	0	0	3	0	1	0	2	X	8
Ontario (Kelly)	0	1	0	1	0	1	0	0	0	X	3

Player percentages
Prince Edward Island		Ontario	
Nancy Cameron	82%	Karen Bourassa	82%
Mark Butler	71%	Shawn Hartle	82%
Susan McInnis	65%	Julie Kelly	74%
John Likely	79%	Dale Kelly	65%
Total	74%	Total	76%

== Playoffs ==
Page playoff system
1	Alberta	6
2	Saskatchewan	4
3	New Brunswick	5
4	Prince Edward Island	6

Semifinal
2	Saskatchewan	10
4	Prince Edward Island	8

Final
1	Alberta	8
2	Saskatchewan	5

=== 1 vs. 2 ===
Sheet B	1	2	3	4	5	6	7	8	9	10	Final
Alberta (Koe) 🔨	0	0	2	0	0	3	0	0	0	1	6
Saskatchewan (Packet)	1	0	0	1	1	0	0	0	1	0	4

Player percentages
Alberta		Saskatchewan	
Lawnie Goodfellow	86%	Audrey Dubiel	95%
Greg Northcott	85%	Dallas Duce	88%
Susan O'Connor	81%	Brenda Lee Malaryk	81%
Kevin Koe	86%	Jim Packet	91%
Total	85%	Total	89%

=== 3 vs. 4 ===
Sheet B	1	2	3	4	5	6	7	8	9	10	Final
New Brunswick (Howard) 🔨	0	2	0	0	1	0	0	0	1	1	5
Prince Edward Island (Likely)	1	0	1	1	0	1	1	1	0	0	6

Player percentages
New Brunswick		Prince Edward Island	
Wendy Howard	84%	Nancy Cameron	83%
Wayne Tallon	88%	Mark Butler	96%
Nancy Toner	83%	Susan McInnis	86%
Russ Howard	71%	John Likely	85%
Total	81%	Total	88%

=== Semifinal ===
Sheet B	1	2	3	4	5	6	7	8	9	10	11	Final
Saskatchewan (Packet) 🔨	3	1	0	2	0	0	1	0	1	0	2	10
Prince Edward Island (Likely)	0	0	2	0	3	0	0	2	0	1	0	8

Player percentages
Saskatchewan		Prince Edward Island	
Audrey Dubiel	82%	Nancy Cameron	88%
Dallas Duce	76%	Mark Butler	84%
Brenda Lee Malaryk	78%	Susan McInnis	84%
Jim Packet	86%	John Likely	77%
Total	80%	Total	83%

=== Final ===
Sheet B	1	2	3	4	5	6	7	8	9	10	Final
Alberta (Koe) 🔨	2	0	0	0	4	0	0	2	0	X	8
Saskatchewan (Packet)	0	0	1	1	0	2	0	0	1	X	5

Player percentages
Alberta		Saskatchewan	
Lawnie Goodfellow	99%	Audrey Dubiel	88%
Greg Northcott	88%	Kory Kohuch	94%
Susan O'Connor	93%	Brenda Lee Malaryk	84%
Kevin Koe	82%	Jim Packet	65%
Total	90%	Total	83%
