= 1992 Canadian Junior Curling Championships =

The 1992 Pepsi Canadian Junior Curling Championships were held March 21 to 28, 1992 at the Vernon Curling Club in Vernon, British Columbia.

== Men's ==
=== Teams ===
Province / Territory	Skip	Third	Second	Lead	Club
British Columbia	Grant Dezura	Stewart Glynes	Scott Gregory	Andrew Paul	Golden Ears Winter Club, Haney
Yukon/Northwest Territories	Scott Odian	Robert Andrews	Clinton Abel	Alfred Feldman	Whitehorse Curling Club, Whitehorse
New Brunswick	Pat Lynch	Matt Goodine	Scott Stonehouse	Dallas Southcott	Capital Winter Club, Fredericton
Manitoba	Scott McFadyen	Kevin MacKenzie	Ross McFadyen	Chad McMullen	Assiniboine Curling Club, Winnipeg
Prince Edward Island	Mike Gaudet	Eddie MacKenzie	Tyler Harris	John Peters	Silver Fox Curling Club, Summerside
Alberta	Chris Hassall	Wade Johnston	Gregory Leggett	Michael Krinbill	Chauvin Curling Club, Chauvin
Nova Scotia	Shawn Adams	Benjamin Blanchard	Blake Brown	Robert MacArthur	Bridgewater Curling Club, Bridgewater
Ontario	Adam Spencer	Greg Robinson	Jeff Robinson	Nolan Sims	Guelph Curling Club, Guelph
Newfoundland	Trevor Miller	Todd Adams	Kenneth Langdon	Jason Nichols	Grand Falls Curling Club, Grand Falls
Quebec	Michel Ferland	Marco Berthelot	Steve Beaudry	Steve Guetre	Club de curling Laviolette, Trois-Rivières
Northern Ontario	Brad Minogue	Greg Cantin	Matthew Jessup	Tyler Lockhart	North Bay Granite Club, North Bay
Saskatchewan	Scott Bitz	Jeff Tait	Pat Simmons	Greg Burrows	Caledonian Curling Club, Regina

=== Standings ===
Locale	Skip	W	L
Quebec	Michel Ferland	9	2
Nova Scotia	Shawn Adams	8	3
Prince Edward Island	Mike Gaudet	6	5
Ontario	Adam Spencer	6	5
Saskatchewan	Scott Bitz	6	5
New Brunswick	Pat Lynch	5	6
Northern Ontario	Brad Minogue	5	6
Yukon/Northwest Territories	Scott Odian	5	6
Manitoba	Scott McFadyen	5	6
Newfoundland	Trevor Miller	4	7
British Columbia	Grant Dezura	4	7
Alberta	Chris Hassall	3	8

=== Results ===
==== Draw 1 ====
Sheet B	1	2	3	4	5	6	7	8	9	10	Final
Yukon/Northwest Territories (Odian)	2	0	2	2	2	2	1	X	X	X	11
Newfoundland (Miller)	0	1	0	0	0	0	0	X	X	X	1

Sheet C	1	2	3	4	5	6	7	8	9	10	Final
New Brunswick (Lynch)	1	0	0	0	0	0	0	1	0	X	2
Manitoba (McFadyen)	0	0	2	0	0	0	4	0	3	X	9

Sheet F	1	2	3	4	5	6	7	8	9	10	Final
Saskatchewan (Bitz)	0	0	0	0	0	0	0	0	1	0	1
Nova Scotia (Adams)	0	0	0	0	0	0	1	0	0	2	3

==== Draw 2 ====
Sheet A	1	2	3	4	5	6	7	8	9	10	Final
British Columbia (Dezura)	0	0	0	0	0	0	2	0	X	X	2
Quebec (Ferland)	1	0	0	0	3	1	0	2	X	X	7

Sheet D	1	2	3	4	5	6	7	8	9	10	11	Final
Prince Edward Island (Gaudet)	1	0	1	0	2	0	2	0	1	0	2	9
Northern Ontario (Minogue)	0	2	0	1	0	1	0	2	0	1	0	7

Sheet E	1	2	3	4	5	6	7	8	9	10	11	Final
Ontario (Spencer)	0	1	0	1	0	0	1	1	0	0	3	7
Alberta (Hassall)	1	0	1	0	1	1	0	0	0	0	0	4

==== Draw 3 ====
Sheet A	1	2	3	4	5	6	7	8	9	10	Final
Saskatchewan (Bitz)	0	0	2	0	0	0	1	1	0	X	4
Newfoundland (Miller)	0	0	0	0	1	0	0	0	1	X	2

Sheet D	1	2	3	4	5	6	7	8	9	10	11	Final
Nova Scotia (Adams)	0	2	0	0	1	1	1	0	1	0	2	8
Manitoba (McFadyen)	1	0	1	2	0	0	0	1	0	1	0	6

Sheet F	1	2	3	4	5	6	7	8	9	10	Final
Yukon/Northwest Territories (Odian)	0	0	2	0	1	0	2	0	1	0	6
New Brunswick (Lynch)	1	1	0	2	0	2	0	1	0	0	7

==== Draw 4 ====
Sheet B	1	2	3	4	5	6	7	8	9	10	Final
Quebec (Ferland)	0	0	1	0	2	1	0	0	1	0	5
Alberta (Hassall)	0	1	0	2	0	0	0	1	0	0	4

Sheet C	1	2	3	4	5	6	7	8	9	10	Final
Ontario (Spencer)	0	2	0	1	1	0	0	X	X	X	4
Prince Edward Island (Gaudet)	2	0	2	0	0	2	3	X	X	X	9

Sheet E	1	2	3	4	5	6	7	8	9	10	Final
British Columbia (Dezura)	1	0	2	0	2	3	2	X	X	X	10
Northern Ontario (Minogue)	0	2	0	2	0	0	0	X	X	X	4

==== Draw 5 ====
Sheet A	1	2	3	4	5	6	7	8	9	10	11	Final
New Brunswick (Lynch)	1	0	1	0	1	0	1	0	0	1	0	5
Nova Scotia (Adams)	0	0	0	1	0	2	0	0	2	0	1	6

Sheet C	1	2	3	4	5	6	7	8	9	10	11	Final
Saskatchewan (Bitz)	0	1	0	0	1	0	3	0	0	0	0	5
Yukon/Northwest Territories (Odian)	0	0	2	0	0	2	0	0	0	1	1	6

Sheet E	1	2	3	4	5	6	7	8	9	10	Final
Manitoba (McFadyen)	2	1	0	0	0	1	0	1	2	0	7
Newfoundland (Miller)	0	0	2	1	0	0	1	0	0	0	4

==== Draw 6 ====
Sheet B	1	2	3	4	5	6	7	8	9	10	Final
Northern Ontario (Minogue)	0	0	1	0	1	1	1	0	0	X	4
Ontario (Spencer)	1	2	0	2	0	0	0	0	2	X	7

Sheet D	1	2	3	4	5	6	7	8	9	10	Final
Alberta (Hassall)	0	1	0	1	0	1	0	0	0	X	3
British Columbia (Dezura)	0	0	1	0	3	0	2	1	1	X	8

Sheet F	1	2	3	4	5	6	7	8	9	10	Final
Prince Edward Island (Gaudet)	0	1	0	0	0	0	0	1	0	0	2
Quebec (Ferland)	1	0	0	0	0	0	1	0	0	1	3

==== Draw 7 ====
Sheet B	1	2	3	4	5	6	7	8	9	10	Final
Prince Edward Island (Gaudet)	1	1	2	0	2	0	1	1	X	X	8
British Columbia (Dezura)	0	0	0	1	0	2	0	0	X	X	3

Sheet D	1	2	3	4	5	6	7	8	9	10	Final
Quebec (Ferland)	0	2	0	0	0	1	0	2	0	1	6
Ontario (Spencer)	0	0	0	0	2	0	2	0	1	0	5

Sheet F	1	2	3	4	5	6	7	8	9	10	Final
Northern Ontario (Minogue)	0	0	2	1	1	0	2	0	0	X	6
Alberta (Hassall)	0	0	0	0	0	2	0	1	0	X	3

==== Draw 8 ====
Sheet A	1	2	3	4	5	6	7	8	9	10	11	Final
Yukon/Northwest Territories (Odian)	0	0	2	0	1	0	1	0	2	0	1	7
Manitoba (McFadyen)	0	0	0	0	0	0	0	4	0	2	0	6

Sheet C	1	2	3	4	5	6	7	8	9	10	Final
Newfoundland (Miller)	0	0	0	0	2	1	0	1	0	1	5
Nova Scotia (Adams)	0	0	0	0	0	0	1	0	2	0	3

Sheet E	1	2	3	4	5	6	7	8	9	10	Final
Saskatchewan (Bitz)	0	0	2	2	0	0	2	0	0	X	6
New Brunswick (Lynch)	0	1	0	0	1	0	0	1	0	X	3

==== Draw 9 ====
Sheet A	1	2	3	4	5	6	7	8	9	10	Final
Alberta (Hassall)	3	0	0	2	3	0	X	X	X	X	8
Prince Edward Island (Gaudet)	0	1	1	0	0	1	X	X	X	X	3

Sheet C	1	2	3	4	5	6	7	8	9	10	Final
Quebec (Ferland)	0	0	4	0	0	0	0	2	0	0	6
Northern Ontario (Minogue)	1	1	0	0	2	0	1	0	1	1	7

Sheet F	1	2	3	4	5	6	7	8	9	10	Final
British Columbia (Dezura)	0	0	0	0	2	0	2	0	X	X	4
Ontario (Spencer)	1	2	2	2	0	1	0	2	X	X	10

==== Draw 10 ====
Sheet B	1	2	3	4	5	6	7	8	9	10	Final
Manitoba (McFadyen)	0	0	1	0	1	0	0	0	1	X	3
Saskatchewan (Bitz)	1	1	0	1	0	0	1	1	0	X	5

Sheet D	1	2	3	4	5	6	7	8	9	10	11	Final
Newfoundland (Miller)	2	0	0	0	0	1	0	0	0	1	1	5
New Brunswick (Lynch)	0	1	0	1	0	0	0	1	1	0	0	4

Sheet E	1	2	3	4	5	6	7	8	9	10	Final
Yukon/Northwest Territories (Odian)	0	0	1	0	0	0	1	1	0	X	3
Nova Scotia (Adams)	0	0	0	1	1	0	0	0	4	X	6

==== Draw 11 ====
Sheet A	1	2	3	4	5	6	7	8	9	10	Final
Quebec (Ferland)	0	0	0	3	1	0	0	0	0	X	4
Nova Scotia (Adams)	0	0	0	0	0	0	0	0	0	X	0

Sheet B	1	2	3	4	5	6	7	8	9	10	Final
Ontario (Spencer)	0	2	1	1	0	0	2	0	1	X	7
New Brunswick (Lynch)	0	0	0	0	1	0	0	1	0	X	2

Sheet C	1	2	3	4	5	6	7	8	9	10	Final
Yukon/Northwest Territories (Odian)	1	0	1	0	0	1	0	2	0	1	6
British Columbia (Dezura)	0	1	0	0	2	0	1	0	1	0	5

Sheet D	1	2	3	4	5	6	7	8	9	10	11	Final
Northern Ontario (Minogue)	0	0	2	0	0	2	0	0	1	0	0	5
Saskatchewan (Bitz)	1	0	0	0	1	0	1	0	0	2	1	6

Sheet E	1	2	3	4	5	6	7	8	9	10	Final
Prince Edward Island (Gaudet)	0	0	1	1	1	0	0	0	0	0	3
Manitoba (McFadyen)	0	1	0	0	0	0	1	0	2	3	7

Sheet F	1	2	3	4	5	6	7	8	9	10	Final
Alberta (Hassall)	1	0	1	1	0	0	1	0	2	X	6
Newfoundland (Miller)	0	1	0	0	0	1	0	1	0	X	3

==== Draw 13 ====
Sheet A	1	2	3	4	5	6	7	8	9	10	Final
New Brunswick (Lynch)	1	0	0	2	0	1	0	1	0	1	6
Northern Ontario (Minogue)	0	1	0	0	1	0	2	0	1	0	5

Sheet B	1	2	3	4	5	6	7	8	9	10	11	Final
British Columbia (Dezura)	2	0	1	0	2	0	1	0	0	0	1	7
Manitoba (McFadyen)	0	0	0	3	0	2	0	0	0	1	0	6

Sheet C	1	2	3	4	5	6	7	8	9	10	Final
Nova Scotia (Adams)	1	0	0	1	0	3	0	0	0	1	6
Alberta (Hassall)	0	1	1	0	2	0	0	0	1	0	5

Sheet D	1	2	3	4	5	6	7	8	9	10	Final
Prince Edward Island (Gaudet)	0	1	0	0	1	0	1	1	1	0	5
Yukon/Northwest Territories (Odian)	0	0	2	2	0	1	0	0	0	3	8

Sheet E	1	2	3	4	5	6	7	8	9	10	Final
Newfoundland (Miller)	0	1	0	0	0	1	0	1	0	1	4
Quebec (Ferland)	1	0	2	0	1	0	1	0	1	0	6

Sheet F	1	2	3	4	5	6	7	8	9	10	Final
Ontario (Spencer)	0	1	0	0	2	1	0	1	0	0	5
Saskatchewan (Bitz)	0	0	1	1	0	0	1	0	1	0	4

==== Draw 16 ====
Sheet A	1	2	3	4	5	6	7	8	9	10	Final
Alberta (Hassall)	0	0	0	0	0	0	0	1	X	X	1
Manitoba (McFadyen)	0	0	1	0	2	0	2	0	X	X	5

Sheet B	1	2	3	4	5	6	7	8	9	10	Final
Nova Scotia (Adams)	0	2	1	0	2	0	0	0	3	X	8
Northern Ontario (Minogue)	0	0	0	2	0	0	1	1	0	X	4

Sheet C	1	2	3	4	5	6	7	8	9	10	Final
British Columbia (Dezura)	1	1	1	0	2	0	1	X	X	X	6
Saskatchewan (Bitz)	0	0	0	1	0	0	0	X	X	X	1

Sheet D	1	2	3	4	5	6	7	8	9	10	Final
Ontario (Spencer)	0	0	0	0	0	2	0	2	0	X	4
Newfoundland (Miller)	1	0	1	2	0	0	1	0	2	X	7

Sheet E	1	2	3	4	5	6	7	8	9	10	Final
New Brunswick (Lynch)	1	3	0	1	0	0	2	0	0	1	8
Prince Edward Island (Gaudet)	0	0	1	0	2	1	0	1	1	0	6

Sheet F	1	2	3	4	5	6	7	8	9	10	Final
Quebec (Ferland)	2	0	0	1	0	0	1	0	3	X	7
Yukon/Northwest Territories (Odian)	0	0	1	0	1	0	0	1	0	X	3

==== Draw 18 ====
Sheet A	1	2	3	4	5	6	7	8	9	10	Final
Newfoundland (Miller)	1	0	2	2	0	0	3	0	0	X	8
British Columbia (Dezura)	0	1	0	0	2	0	0	3	1	X	7

Sheet B	1	2	3	4	5	6	7	8	9	10	Final
New Brunswick (Lynch)	1	0	0	0	1	0	0	0	0	1	3
Quebec (Ferland)	0	2	0	0	0	0	0	0	2	0	4

Sheet C	1	2	3	4	5	6	7	8	9	10	Final
Manitoba (McFadyen)	0	0	2	1	0	0	4	X	X	X	7
Ontario (Spencer)	0	0	0	0	0	1	0	X	X	X	1

Sheet D	1	2	3	4	5	6	7	8	9	10	Final
Saskatchewan (Bitz)	2	1	1	1	0	2	0	2	X	X	9
Alberta (Hassall)	0	0	0	0	1	0	2	0	X	X	3

Sheet E	1	2	3	4	5	6	7	8	9	10	Final
Northern Ontario (Minogue)	2	2	1	2	0	0	0	4	X	X	11
Yukon/Northwest Territories (Odian)	0	0	0	0	0	1	2	0	X	X	3

Sheet F	1	2	3	4	5	6	7	8	9	10	Final
Nova Scotia (Adams)	0	0	0	3	1	0	0	3	0	0	7
Prince Edward Island (Gaudet)	1	1	3	0	0	1	1	0	1	2	10

==== Draw 19 ====
Sheet A	1	2	3	4	5	6	7	8	9	10	Final
Prince Edward Island (Gaudet)	0	2	1	0	0	2	0	0	0	1	6
Saskatchewan (Bitz)	0	0	0	2	1	0	1	0	1	0	5

Sheet B	1	2	3	4	5	6	7	8	9	10	Final
Alberta (Hassall)	2	0	1	0	0	0	3	0	1	X	7
Yukon/Northwest Territories (Odian)	0	2	0	0	0	2	0	1	0	X	5

Sheet C	1	2	3	4	5	6	7	8	9	10	11	Final
Northern Ontario (Minogue)	0	1	0	0	3	0	1	0	1	0	1	7
Newfoundland (Miller)	0	0	0	1	0	1	0	1	0	3	0	6

Sheet D	1	2	3	4	5	6	7	8	9	10	11	Final
Manitoba (McFadyen)	0	1	0	0	0	1	0	0	0	0	0	2
Quebec (Ferland)	0	0	1	0	0	0	0	0	0	1	1	3

Sheet E	1	2	3	4	5	6	7	8	9	10	Final
Nova Scotia (Adams)	0	5	0	2	1	0	2	X	X	X	10
Ontario (Spencer)	1	0	1	0	0	1	0	X	X	X	3

Sheet F	1	2	3	4	5	6	7	8	9	10	Final
New Brunswick (Lynch)	3	0	0	2	0	1	0	0	1	0	7
British Columbia (Dezura)	0	0	1	0	1	0	2	1	0	0	5

==== Draw 21 ====
Sheet A	1	2	3	4	5	6	7	8	9	10	Final
Ontario (Spencer)	1	1	1	0	0	1	0	0	3	X	7
Yukon/Northwest Territories (Odian)	0	0	0	1	0	0	1	2	0	X	4

Sheet B	1	2	3	4	5	6	7	8	9	10	Final
Newfoundland (Miller)	0	0	1	0	1	0	0	0	0	X	2
Prince Edward Island (Gaudet)	3	0	0	0	0	1	1	1	1	X	7

Sheet C	1	2	3	4	5	6	7	8	9	10	Final
Alberta (Hassall)	0	0	1	0	0	0	1	0	1	0	3
New Brunswick (Lynch)	1	0	0	0	2	0	0	1	0	1	5

Sheet D	1	2	3	4	5	6	7	8	9	10	Final
British Columbia (Dezura)	1	0	0	0	1	0	X	X	X	X	2
Nova Scotia (Adams)	0	2	1	5	0	2	X	X	X	X	10

Sheet E	1	2	3	4	5	6	7	8	9	10	Final
Quebec (Ferland)	1	0	0	2	0	0	1	0	0	0	4
Saskatchewan (Bitz)	0	2	2	0	0	1	0	0	0	3	8

Sheet F	1	2	3	4	5	6	7	8	9	10	Final
Manitoba (McFadyen)	1	0	0	1	0	1	0	X	X	X	3
Northern Ontario (Minogue)	0	4	0	0	3	0	2	X	X	X	9

=== Playoffs ===
Tiebreaker #1
Saskatchewan	5
Ontario	4

Tiebreaker #2
Saskatchewan	7
Prince Edward Island	8

Semifinal
Prince Edward Island	3
Nova Scotia	5

Final
Quebec	7
Nova Scotia	5

==== Tiebreaker #1 ====
Sheet D	1	2	3	4	5	6	7	8	9	10	Final
Saskatchewan (Bitz)	2	0	0	1	0	2	0	0	0	0	5
Ontario (Spencer)	0	0	1	0	1	0	0	1	0	1	4

Player percentages
Saskatchewan		Ontario	
Greg Burrows	83%	Nolan Sims	79%
Pat Simmons	89%	Jeff Robinson	83%
Jeff Tait	70%	Greg Robinson	80%
Scott Bitz	93%	Adam Spencer	76%
Total	84%	Total	79%

==== Tiebreaker #2 ====
Sheet C	1	2	3	4	5	6	7	8	9	10	Final
Saskatchewan (Bitz)	0	0	2	0	2	0	0	2	1	0	7
Prince Edward Island (Gaudet)	2	0	0	2	0	1	2	0	0	1	8

Player percentages
Saskatchewan		Prince Edward Island	
Greg Burrows	90%	John Peters	86%
Pat Simmons	83%	Tyler Harris	60%
Jeff Tait	80%	Eddie MacKenzie	68%
Scott Bitz	78%	Mike Gaudet	71%
Total	83%	Total	71%

==== Semifinal ====
Sheet D	1	2	3	4	5	6	7	8	9	10	Final
Prince Edward Island (Gaudet)	0	1	0	0	2	0	0	0	0	X	3
Nova Scotia (Adams)	2	0	0	1	0	2	0	0	0	X	5

Player percentages
Prince Edward Island		Nova Scotia	
John Peters	81%	Robert MacArthur	55%
Tyler Harris	70%	Blake Brown	85%
Eddie MacKenzie	69%	Benjamin Blanchard	81%
Mike Gaudet	68%	Shawn Adams	75%
Total	72%	Total	75%

==== Final ====
Sheet C	1	2	3	4	5	6	7	8	9	10	Final
Quebec (Ferland)	1	0	1	3	0	0	1	0	0	1	7
Nova Scotia (Adams)	0	1	0	0	2	0	0	2	0	0	5

Player percentages
Quebec		Nova Scotia	
Steve Guetre	76%	Robert MacArthur	90%
Steve Beaudry	64%	Blake Brown	83%
Marco Berthelot	83%	Benjamin Blanchard	75%
Michel Ferland	86%	Shawn Adams	80%
Total	77%	Total	82%

== Women's ==
=== Teams ===
Province / Territory	Skip	Third	Second	Lead
British Columbia	Allison MacInnes	Jo-Anne Wright	Heather Mockford	Erin Forrest
Northwest Territories/Yukon	Janet Sian	Coralee Hamer	Tara Hamer	Kim Barraclough
New Brunswick	Louise Firlotte	Angela MacPherson	Melanie Ellis	Carolyn Blanchard
Manitoba	Tracey Lavery	Diana Chamaziuk	Denise Genyk	Carlene Muth
Prince Edward Island	Rebecca MacPhee	Susie Roberts	Pam Sweetapple	Luanne Henry
Alberta	Rhonda Sinclair	Jody Lee	Lori Olson	KaryAnne Kjelshus
Nova Scotia	Jackie-Lee Myra	Melanie Comstock	Heidi Tanner	Sara Jane Rawding
Ontario	Heather Crockett	Kim Gellard	Johnalee Fraser	Corie Beveridge
Newfoundland	Cheryl Cofield	Susan Martin	Danette Kirby	Heather Strong
Quebec	Janique Berthelot	Jessica Marchand	Annie Cadorette	Carolyne Sanschagrin
Northern Ontario	Tara Coulterman	Melody Farkas	Amy Uhryn	Jennifer Smith
Saskatchewan	Amber Holland	Cindy Street	Tracy Beach	Angela Street

=== Standings ===
Locale	Skip	W	L
Saskatchewan	Amber Holland	9	2
Northern Ontario	Tara Coulterman	8	3
Prince Edward Island	Rebecca MacPhee	7	4
Quebec	Janique Berthelot	7	4
Alberta	Rhonda Sinclair	7	4
Ontario	Heather Crockett	7	4
Manitoba	Tracey Lavery	5	6
British Columbia	Allison MacInnes	5	6
Nova Scotia	Jackie-Lee Myra	4	7
Newfoundland	Cheryl Cofield	4	7
Northwest Territories/Yukon	Janet Sian	2	9
New Brunswick	Louise Firlotte	1	10

=== Results ===
==== Draw 1 ====
Sheet A	1	2	3	4	5	6	7	8	9	10	Final
British Columbia (MacInnes)	0	2	0	4	0	2	0	2	X	X	10
Quebec (Berthelot)	0	0	1	0	2	0	1	0	X	X	4

Sheet D	1	2	3	4	5	6	7	8	9	10	Final
Prince Edward Island (MacPhee)	1	0	1	0	1	0	0	1	0	X	4
Northern Ontario (Coulterman)	0	0	0	2	0	2	3	0	1	X	8

Sheet E	1	2	3	4	5	6	7	8	9	10	Final
Alberta (Sinclair)	2	0	0	0	0	2	0	1	0	1	6
Ontario (Crockett)	0	1	0	2	0	0	2	0	0	0	5

==== Draw 2 ====
Sheet B	1	2	3	4	5	6	7	8	9	10	Final
Northwest Territories/Yukon (Sian)	2	0	1	0	2	0	2	0	2	0	9
Newfoundland (Cofield)	0	2	0	2	0	2	0	4	0	1	11

Sheet C	1	2	3	4	5	6	7	8	9	10	Final
New Brunswick (Firlotte)	0	0	0	0	0	1	0	0	X	X	1
Manitoba (Lavery)	2	1	1	0	1	0	3	2	X	X	10

Sheet F	1	2	3	4	5	6	7	8	9	10	Final
Saskatchewan (Holland)	0	0	0	3	0	1	3	0	2	X	9
Nova Scotia (Myra)	0	1	1	0	0	0	0	1	0	X	3

==== Draw 3 ====
Sheet B	1	2	3	4	5	6	7	8	9	10	Final
Quebec (Berthelot)	3	1	0	3	0	3	0	0	0	X	10
Alberta (Sinclair)	0	0	2	0	1	0	2	2	0	X	7

Sheet C	1	2	3	4	5	6	7	8	9	10	Final
Ontario (Crockett)	0	1	0	3	0	1	0	2	0	X	7
Prince Edward Island (MacPhee)	2	0	2	0	1	0	0	0	1	X	6

Sheet E	1	2	3	4	5	6	7	8	9	10	11	Final
Northern Ontario (Coulterman)	0	0	2	0	3	0	1	0	1	0	2	9
British Columbia (MacInnes)	0	0	0	3	0	1	0	1	0	2	0	7

==== Draw 4 ====
Sheet A	1	2	3	4	5	6	7	8	9	10	Final
Newfoundland (Cofield)	0	0	0	0	0	1	0	0	X	X	1
Saskatchewan (Holland)	1	0	0	1	4	0	1	3	X	X	10

Sheet D	1	2	3	4	5	6	7	8	9	10	Final
Nova Scotia (Myra)	0	0	1	0	0	3	0	X	X	X	4
Manitoba (Lavery)	1	1	0	2	4	0	3	X	X	X	11

Sheet F	1	2	3	4	5	6	7	8	9	10	Final
Northwest Territories/Yukon (Sian)	2	0	0	3	1	1	3	1	X	X	11
New Brunswick (Firlotte)	0	3	2	0	0	0	0	0	X	X	5

==== Draw 5 ====
Sheet B	1	2	3	4	5	6	7	8	9	10	Final
Northern Ontario (Coulterman)	1	0	0	1	0	1	0	X	X	X	3
Ontario (Crockett)	0	1	2	0	2	0	3	X	X	X	8

Sheet D	1	2	3	4	5	6	7	8	9	10	Final
Alberta (Sinclair)	1	1	0	0	0	1	0	2	0	1	6
British Columbia (MacInnes)	0	0	1	1	0	0	1	0	1	0	4

Sheet F	1	2	3	4	5	6	7	8	9	10	Final
Prince Edward Island (MacPhee)	1	0	1	1	0	1	0	0	0	2	6
Quebec (Berthelot)	0	1	0	0	0	0	0	3	1	0	5

==== Draw 6 ====
Sheet A	1	2	3	4	5	6	7	8	9	10	Final
Nova Scotia (Myra)	1	2	0	0	0	0	1	0	3	4	11
New Brunswick (Firlotte)	0	0	2	1	0	2	0	1	0	0	6

Sheet C	1	2	3	4	5	6	7	8	9	10	Final
Saskatchewan (Holland)	3	0	4	0	1	0	2	X	X	X	10
Northwest Territories/Yukon (Sian)	0	1	0	1	0	1	0	X	X	X	3

Sheet E	1	2	3	4	5	6	7	8	9	10	Final
Manitoba (Lavery)	0	0	0	1	0	0	0	4	0	X	5
Newfoundland (Cofield)	1	2	1	0	2	0	1	0	1	X	8

==== Draw 7 ====
Sheet A	1	2	3	4	5	6	7	8	9	10	Final
Northwest Territories/Yukon (Sian)	2	0	3	0	0	0	0	3	0	X	8
Manitoba (Lavery)	0	1	0	3	0	2	3	0	1	X	10

Sheet C	1	2	3	4	5	6	7	8	9	10	Final
Newfoundland (Cofield)	1	0	0	0	0	0	0	X	X	X	1
Nova Scotia (Myra)	0	2	1	2	1	1	2	X	X	X	9

Sheet E	1	2	3	4	5	6	7	8	9	10	Final
Saskatchewan (Holland)	1	2	2	2	2	X	X	X	X	X	9
New Brunswick (Firlotte)	0	0	0	0	0	X	X	X	X	X	0

==== Draw 8 ====
Sheet B	1	2	3	4	5	6	7	8	9	10	11	Final
Prince Edward Island (MacPhee)	0	1	1	0	1	1	0	0	0	2	1	7
British Columbia (MacInnes)	0	0	0	1	0	0	2	3	0	0	0	6

Sheet D	1	2	3	4	5	6	7	8	9	10	11	Final
Ontario (Crockett)	1	0	0	1	0	0	1	0	2	1	0	6
Quebec (Berthelot)	0	1	1	0	0	1	0	3	0	0	1	7

Sheet F	1	2	3	4	5	6	7	8	9	10	Final
Northern Ontario (Coulterman)	1	0	0	0	1	1	2	1	0	X	6
Alberta (Sinclair)	0	1	0	0	0	0	0	0	1	X	2

==== Draw 9 ====
Sheet B	1	2	3	4	5	6	7	8	9	10	Final
Manitoba (Lavery)	1	2	0	1	0	0	1	0	1	0	6
Saskatchewan (Holland)	0	0	3	0	0	2	0	1	0	1	7

Sheet D	1	2	3	4	5	6	7	8	9	10	11	Final
New Brunswick (Firlotte)	1	0	2	0	0	2	0	4	0	0	3	12
Newfoundland (Cofield)	0	1	0	1	1	0	1	0	4	1	0	9

Sheet E	1	2	3	4	5	6	7	8	9	10	Final
Northwest Territories/Yukon (Sian)	0	0	0	0	1	0	X	X	X	X	1
Nova Scotia (Myra)	2	0	1	2	0	3	X	X	X	X	8

==== Draw 10 ====
Sheet A	1	2	3	4	5	6	7	8	9	10	Final
Alberta (Sinclair)	1	0	1	0	0	0	0	0	2	X	4
Prince Edward Island (MacPhee)	0	2	0	0	2	0	0	2	0	X	6

Sheet C	1	2	3	4	5	6	7	8	9	10	Final
Quebec (Berthelot)	0	0	2	0	2	0	0	0	0	1	5
Northern Ontario (Coulterman)	2	0	0	2	0	2	0	0	0	0	6

Sheet F	1	2	3	4	5	6	7	8	9	10	Final
British Columbia (MacInnes)	0	0	0	1	0	0	1	0	0	0	2
Ontario (Crockett)	1	1	0	0	1	0	0	1	0	1	5

==== Draw 12 ====
Sheet A	1	2	3	4	5	6	7	8	9	10	Final
Quebec (Berthelot)	0	0	0	1	2	3	1	0	1	X	8
Nova Scotia (Myra)	1	0	0	0	0	0	0	2	0	X	3

Sheet B	1	2	3	4	5	6	7	8	9	10	Final
Ontario (Crockett)	3	1	0	0	3	3	0	7	X	X	17
New Brunswick (Firlotte)	0	0	0	1	0	0	1	0	X	X	2

Sheet C	1	2	3	4	5	6	7	8	9	10	Final
British Columbia (MacInnes)	4	1	1	0	5	0	1	3	X	X	15
Northwest Territories/Yukon (Sian)	0	0	0	3	0	3	0	0	X	X	6

Sheet D	1	2	3	4	5	6	7	8	9	10	Final
Northern Ontario (Coulterman)	2	0	1	0	3	0	2	0	1	X	9
Saskatchewan (Holland)	0	2	0	2	0	2	0	4	0	X	10

Sheet E	1	2	3	4	5	6	7	8	9	10	11	Final
Prince Edward Island (MacPhee)	1	0	2	0	0	1	0	0	0	1	0	5
Manitoba (Lavery)	0	1	0	1	1	0	0	1	1	0	1	6

Sheet F	1	2	3	4	5	6	7	8	9	10	Final
Alberta (Sinclair)	1	2	1	1	0	0	0	0	3	X	8
Newfoundland (Cofield)	0	0	0	0	1	1	1	1	0	X	4

==== Draw 14 ====
Sheet A	1	2	3	4	5	6	7	8	9	10	Final
Northern Ontario (Coulterman)	3	0	1	2	1	1	0	2	0	X	10
New Brunswick (Firlotte)	0	2	0	0	0	0	1	0	1	X	4

Sheet B	1	2	3	4	5	6	7	8	9	10	Final
British Columbia (MacInnes)	1	0	1	0	0	0	0	0	X	X	2
Manitoba (Lavery)	0	2	0	0	0	1	2	3	X	X	8

Sheet C	1	2	3	4	5	6	7	8	9	10	Final
Quebec (Berthelot)	2	0	3	0	2	0	5	1	X	X	13
Newfoundland (Cofield)	0	1	0	2	0	1	0	0	X	X	4

Sheet D	1	2	3	4	5	6	7	8	9	10	Final
Northwest Territories/Yukon (Sian)	0	0	0	0	1	1	0	0	0	X	2
Prince Edward Island (MacPhee)	1	3	1	0	0	0	2	1	2	X	10

Sheet E	1	2	3	4	5	6	7	8	9	10	Final
Nova Scotia (Myra)	2	3	1	0	0	4	X	X	X	X	10
Alberta (Sinclair)	0	0	0	1	1	0	X	X	X	X	2

Sheet F	1	2	3	4	5	6	7	8	9	10	11	Final
Ontario (Crockett)	0	0	0	0	1	1	1	0	1	0	0	4
Saskatchewan (Holland)	0	1	1	0	0	0	0	1	0	1	1	5

==== Draw 15 ====
Sheet A	1	2	3	4	5	6	7	8	9	10	Final
Manitoba (Lavery)	2	0	0	1	0	0	0	0	0	X	3
Alberta (Sinclair)	0	2	1	0	0	0	1	1	1	X	6

Sheet B	1	2	3	4	5	6	7	8	9	10	Final
Nova Scotia (Myra)	1	0	1	0	1	0	0	2	0	0	5
Northern Ontario (Coulterman)	0	1	0	2	0	1	0	0	0	2	6

Sheet C	1	2	3	4	5	6	7	8	9	10	Final
British Columbia (MacInnes)	1	0	1	0	1	1	0	0	0	1	5
Saskatchewan (Holland)	0	1	0	0	0	0	1	0	0	0	2

Sheet D	1	2	3	4	5	6	7	8	9	10	Final
Ontario (Crockett)	0	0	2	0	2	0	4	0	X	X	8
Newfoundland (Cofield)	0	0	0	1	0	1	0	1	X	X	3

Sheet E	1	2	3	4	5	6	7	8	9	10	Final
New Brunswick (Firlotte)	0	2	1	0	2	0	0	1	0	X	6
Prince Edward Island (MacPhee)	1	0	0	3	0	4	0	0	1	X	9

Sheet F	1	2	3	4	5	6	7	8	9	10	Final
Quebec (Berthelot)	0	2	0	0	0	1	2	0	0	X	5
Northwest Territories/Yukon (Sian)	0	0	1	1	1	0	0	0	1	X	4

==== Draw 17 ====
Sheet A	1	2	3	4	5	6	7	8	9	10	Final
Newfoundland (Cofield)	0	2	0	1	0	1	1	0	0	1	6
British Columbia (MacInnes)	1	0	0	0	1	0	0	0	2	0	4

Sheet B	1	2	3	4	5	6	7	8	9	10	Final
New Brunswick (Firlotte)	0	0	0	0	0	0	X	X	X	X	0
Quebec (Berthelot)	1	1	1	2	1	2	X	X	X	X	8

Sheet C	1	2	3	4	5	6	7	8	9	10	Final
Manitoba (Lavery)	0	0	0	1	1	0	1	0	2	0	5
Ontario (Crockett)	1	0	1	0	0	1	0	3	0	0	6

Sheet D	1	2	3	4	5	6	7	8	9	10	11	Final
Saskatchewan (Holland)	0	1	0	0	0	2	0	0	0	3	0	6
Alberta (Sinclair)	1	0	0	1	1	0	1	1	1	0	1	7

Sheet E	1	2	3	4	5	6	7	8	9	10	Final
Northern Ontario (Coulterman)	2	0	2	0	1	0	1	0	0	2	8
Northwest Territories/Yukon (Sian)	0	1	0	2	0	1	0	0	0	0	4

Sheet F	1	2	3	4	5	6	7	8	9	10	Final
Prince Edward Island (MacPhee)	3	0	0	2	0	0	1	0	0	1	7
Nova Scotia (Myra)	0	2	1	0	1	0	0	1	1	0	6

==== Draw 20 ====
Sheet A	1	2	3	4	5	6	7	8	9	10	Final
Prince Edward Island (MacPhee)	1	0	1	1	0	0	0	1	1	0	5
Saskatchewan (Holland)	0	1	0	0	2	1	2	0	0	0	6

Sheet B	1	2	3	4	5	6	7	8	9	10	Final
Alberta (Sinclair)	0	0	3	1	1	0	0	0	2	X	7
Northwest Territories/Yukon (Sian)	0	2	0	0	0	1	1	1	0	X	5

Sheet C	1	2	3	4	5	6	7	8	9	10	Final
Newfoundland (Cofield)	1	1	1	2	0	0	0	0	0	1	6
Northern Ontario (Coulterman)	0	0	0	0	0	0	1	2	1	0	4

Sheet D	1	2	3	4	5	6	7	8	9	10	Final
Manitoba (Lavery)	2	0	0	1	0	0	0	X	X	X	3
Quebec (Berthelot)	0	1	2	0	1	2	4	X	X	X	10

Sheet E	1	2	3	4	5	6	7	8	9	10	Final
Nova Scotia (Myra)	1	0	2	1	0	0	1	0	0	0	5
Ontario (Crockett)	0	1	0	0	3	1	0	1	0	2	8

Sheet F	1	2	3	4	5	6	7	8	9	10	Final
New Brunswick (Firlotte)	0	0	1	0	0	0	X	X	X	X	1
British Columbia (MacInnes)	1	2	0	2	3	3	X	X	X	X	11

==== Draw 22 ====
Sheet A	1	2	3	4	5	6	7	8	9	10	Final
Ontario (Crockett)	2	0	1	0	2	0	0	2	0	0	7
Northwest Territories/Yukon (Sian)	0	1	0	1	0	2	1	0	0	3	8

Sheet B	1	2	3	4	5	6	7	8	9	10	Final
Newfoundland (Cofield)	1	0	0	0	0	1	0	0	X	X	2
Prince Edward Island (MacPhee)	0	1	0	0	2	0	5	3	X	X	11

Sheet C	1	2	3	4	5	6	7	8	9	10	Final
Alberta (Sinclair)	1	0	0	0	1	0	2	1	0	1	6
New Brunswick (Firlotte)	0	1	0	1	0	1	0	0	1	0	4

Sheet D	1	2	3	4	5	6	7	8	9	10	Final
British Columbia (MacInnes)	1	0	1	0	1	0	1	0	1	2	7
Nova Scotia (Myra)	0	2	0	1	0	1	0	0	0	0	4

Sheet E	1	2	3	4	5	6	7	8	9	10	Final
Saskatchewan (Holland)	0	4	0	1	0	0	2	2	2	X	11
Quebec (Berthelot)	0	0	2	0	2	1	0	0	0	X	5

Sheet F	1	2	3	4	5	6	7	8	9	10	Final
Manitoba (Lavery)	0	0	1	0	0	0	1	1	0	X	3
Northern Ontario (Coulterman)	0	2	0	1	1	1	0	0	1	X	6

=== Tiebreakers ===
==== Tiebreaker #1 ====
Sheet B	1	2	3	4	5	6	7	8	9	10	Final
Quebec (Berthelot)	1	0	0	0	0	0	0	2	1	3	7
Alberta (Sinclair)	0	0	1	1	0	1	1	0	0	0	4

Player percentages
Quebec		Alberta	
Carolyne Sanschagrin	66%	KaryAnne Kjelshus	73%
Annie Cadorette	63%	Lori Olson	61%
Jessica Marchand	74%	Jody Lee	66%
Janique Berthelot	63%	Rhonda Sinclair	59%
Total	66%	Total	65%

Sheet C	1	2	3	4	5	6	7	8	9	10	Final
Prince Edward Island (MacPhee)	1	0	2	0	0	2	0	1	0	X	6
Ontario (Crockett)	0	1	0	2	1	0	3	0	2	X	9

Player percentages
Prince Edward Island		Ontario	
Luanne Henry	73%	Corie Beveridge	83%
Pam Sweetapple	71%	Johnalee Fraser	74%
Susie Roberts	64%	Kim Gellard	69%
Rebecca MacPhee	66%	Heather Crockett	74%
Total	68%	Total	75%

==== Tiebreaker #2 ====
Sheet D	1	2	3	4	5	6	7	8	9	10	Final
Quebec (Berthelot)	1	0	0	0	0	1	0	1	0	X	3
Ontario (Crockett)	0	1	0	1	1	0	3	0	1	X	7

Player percentages
Quebec		Ontario	
Carolyne Sanschagrin	76%	Corie Beveridge	81%
Annie Cadorette	76%	Johnalee Fraser	57%
Jessica Marchand	40%	Kim Gellard	74%
Janique Berthelot	54%	Heather Crockett	69%
Total	62%	Total	70%

=== Playoffs ===
Semifinal		Final
Northern Ontario	8
Ontario	4	Saskatchewan	7
		Northern Ontario	4

==== Semifinal ====
Sheet C	1	2	3	4	5	6	7	8	9	10	Final
Northern Ontario (Coulterman)	3	0	1	1	0	1	0	0	2	X	8
Ontario (Crockett)	0	1	0	0	1	0	0	2	0	X	4

Player percentages
Northern Ontario		Ontario	
Jennifer Smith	63%	Corie Beveridge	85%
Amy Uhryn	65%	Johnalee Fraser	88%
Melody Farkas	69%	Kim Gellard	80%
Tara Coulterman	75%	Heather Crockett	53%
Total	68%	Total	77%

==== Final ====
Sheet D	1	2	3	4	5	6	7	8	9	10	Final
Saskatchewan (Holland)	0	1	0	1	2	1	0	2	0	X	7
Northern Ontario (Coulterman)	0	0	1	0	0	0	2	0	1	X	4

Player percentages
Saskatchewan		Northern Ontario	
Angela Street	73%	Jennifer Smith	84%
Tracy Beach	69%	Amy Uhryn	70%
Cindy Street	71%	Melody Farkas	53%
Amber Holland	69%	Tara Coulterman	56%
Total	71%	Total	66%
