= Marco Berthelot =

Canadian curler from Longueuil, Quebec

- Curler
- Born: December 11, 1972 (age 53); Murdochville, Quebec

Team
- Curling club: CC Cap-de-la-Madeleine, Cap-de-la-Madeleine, Quebec

Curling career
- Brier: 1 (2007)
- Grand Slam victories: 1 (2003 National)
Medal record
Curling
Representing Canada
World Junior Championships
| Silver medal – second place | 1993 Grindelwald |
Canadian Mixed Championship
| Gold medal – first place | 2001 Weyburn |

Marco Berthelot (born December 11, 1972, in Murdochville, Quebec) is a Canadian curler from Longueuil, Quebec.

After playing lead for Michel Ferland at the 1991 Canadian Junior Curling Championships, Berthelot would be bumped up to third on Ferland's team and they won the 1992 Canadian Juniors. This qualified them for the 1993 World Junior Curling Championships where they won a silver medal - losing to Scotland (skipped by Craig Wilson) in the final.

Berthelot played at the 2000 and 2001 Canadian Mixed Curling Championship at second position for Jean-Michel Ménard and won in 2001.

In 2006, Berthelot joined up with Pierre Charette and Berthelot won his first Quebec men's provincial championship in 2007. His last provincial championship appearance was in 2009 playing for Martin Ferland where they lost in the final.

Berthelot is currently the General Manager for Curling Quebec.
