= 1991 Canadian Junior Curling Championships =

The 1991 Pepsi Canadian Junior Curling Championships were held March 9 to 16, 1991 at the Leduc Curling Club in Leduc, Alberta.

== Men's ==
=== Teams ===
Province / Territory	Skip	Third	Second	Lead
Alberta	Rob Schlender	Jeff Wieschorster	Greg Lahti	Craig Waples
Yukon/Northwest Territories	Clinton Abel	Scott Odian	Robert Andrews	Alfred Feldman
New Brunswick	Brian Sullivan	James Grattan	Matthew Goodine	Darren Patterson
Manitoba	James Kirkness	Diane Grierson	Dale Goehring	Derek Jennings
Prince Edward Island	Sean Matheson	Brian Scales	Paul MacCormack	Robbie Newson
British Columbia	Grant Dezura	Stewart Glynes	Scott Gregory	Andrew Paul
Nova Scotia	Steven Eddy	Kris Granchelli	Brant Amos	George Kinsman
Ontario	Pete Steski	Brad Savage	Jason Boyce	Jeff Steski
Newfoundland	Ken Peddigrew	Terry Strickland	Jason Daly	John Green
Quebec	Michel Ferland	Daniel Caron	Steve Beaudry	Marco Berthelot
Northern Ontario	Jason Repay	Aaron Skillen	Scott McCallum	Trevor Clifford
Saskatchewan	Dwayne Metz	Lorin Werle	Craig Hall	Jessie Kendell

=== Standings ===
Locale	Skip	W	L
Alberta	Rob Schlender	8	3
Northern Ontario	Jason Repay	8	3
British Columbia	Grant Dezura	8	3
Ontario	Pete Steski	7	4
Prince Edward Island	Sean Matheson	7	4
Quebec	Michel Ferland	6	5
Nova Scotia	Steven Eddy	5	6
Manitoba	James Kirkness	5	6
New Brunswick	Brian Sullivan	4	7
Yukon/Northwest Territories	Clinton Abel	3	8
Newfoundland	Ken Peddigrew	3	8
Saskatchewan	Dwayne Metz	2	9

=== Results ===
==== Draw 1 ====
Sheet B	1	2	3	4	5	6	7	8	9	10	Final
Northern Ontario (Repay) 🔨	1	0	0	0	0	0	2	1	1	0	5
Yukon/Northwest Territories (Abel)	0	1	1	0	1	1	0	0	0	2	6

Sheet C	1	2	3	4	5	6	7	8	9	10	Final
New Brunswick (Sullivan) 🔨	0	0	2	0	0	2	0	0	0	1	5
Quebec (Ferland)	0	0	0	0	1	0	3	0	0	0	4

Sheet F	1	2	3	4	5	6	7	8	9	10	Final
British Columbia (Dezura) 🔨	0	2	0	1	0	1	3	1	0	X	8
Nova Scotia (Eddy)	0	0	1	0	0	0	0	0	1	X	2

==== Draw 2 ====
Sheet A	1	2	3	4	5	6	7	8	9	10	Final
Alberta (Schlender) 🔨	2	0	0	2	0	0	0	1	0	1	6
Saskatchewan (Metz)	0	1	0	0	0	2	0	0	1	0	4

Sheet D	1	2	3	4	5	6	7	8	9	10	Final
Manitoba (Kirkness) 🔨	0	2	0	0	2	1	2	0	1	X	8
Newfoundland (Peddigrew)	1	0	1	0	0	0	0	1	0	X	3

Sheet E	1	2	3	4	5	6	7	8	9	10	Final
Ontario (Steski) 🔨	2	1	0	1	0	3	0	1	1	X	9
Prince Edward Island (Matheson)	0	0	1	0	2	0	1	0	0	X	4

==== Draw 3 ====
Sheet A	1	2	3	4	5	6	7	8	9	10	Final
British Columbia (Dezura) 🔨	0	3	0	0	3	0	0	2	1	X	9
Yukon/Northwest Territories (Abel)	0	0	2	1	0	1	0	0	0	X	4

Sheet D	1	2	3	4	5	6	7	8	9	10	Final
Nova Scotia (Eddy) 🔨	1	0	1	0	2	0	0	1	0	0	5
Quebec (Ferland)	0	1	0	3	0	1	0	0	0	1	6

Sheet F	1	2	3	4	5	6	7	8	9	10	Final
Northern Ontario (Repay) 🔨	2	0	1	0	0	2	2	0	4	X	11
New Brunswick (Sullivan)	0	1	0	2	0	0	0	1	0	X	4

==== Draw 4 ====
Sheet B	1	2	3	4	5	6	7	8	9	10	Final
Saskatchewan (Metz) 🔨	0	0	2	0	1	1	0	0	0	0	4
Prince Edward Island (Matheson)	1	0	0	2	0	0	0	1	0	1	5

Sheet C	1	2	3	4	5	6	7	8	9	10	Final
Ontario (Steski) 🔨	2	1	0	3	0	2	0	X	X	X	8
Manitoba (Kirkness)	0	0	2	0	1	0	1	X	X	X	4

Sheet E	1	2	3	4	5	6	7	8	9	10	Final
Alberta (Schlender) 🔨	0	2	0	0	2	2	0	0	X	X	6
Newfoundland (Peddigrew)	0	0	0	1	0	0	0	1	X	X	2

==== Draw 5 ====
Sheet A	1	2	3	4	5	6	7	8	9	10	Final
New Brunswick (Sullivan) 🔨	0	2	0	1	0	0	1	0	1	X	5
Nova Scotia (Eddy)	2	0	1	0	2	1	0	1	0	X	7

Sheet C	1	2	3	4	5	6	7	8	9	10	Final
British Columbia (Dezura) 🔨	0	0	1	1	0	0	1	0	1	1	5
Northern Ontario (Repay)	1	2	0	0	1	1	0	1	0	0	6

Sheet E	1	2	3	4	5	6	7	8	9	10	Final
Quebec (Ferland) 🔨	1	0	0	0	1	0	0	0	1	1	4
Yukon/Northwest Territories (Abel)	0	1	0	0	0	1	0	0	0	0	2

==== Draw 6 ====
Sheet B	1	2	3	4	5	6	7	8	9	10	Final
Newfoundland (Peddigrew) 🔨	2	0	2	0	0	1	2	0	2	X	9
Ontario (Steski)	0	1	0	0	1	0	0	0	0	X	2

Sheet D	1	2	3	4	5	6	7	8	9	10	Final
Prince Edward Island (Matheson) 🔨	2	0	1	1	0	0	0	0	0	X	4
Alberta (Schlender)	0	0	0	0	0	0	1	0	0	X	1

Sheet F	1	2	3	4	5	6	7	8	9	10	Final
Manitoba (Kirkness) 🔨	0	2	0	0	1	0	0	1	2	1	7
Saskatchewan (Metz)	0	0	0	3	0	2	0	0	0	0	5

==== Draw 7 ====
Sheet B	1	2	3	4	5	6	7	8	9	10	Final
Manitoba (Kirkness) 🔨	0	1	0	0	1	0	0	2	0	X	4
Alberta (Schlender)	0	0	4	0	0	0	1	0	2	X	7

Sheet D	1	2	3	4	5	6	7	8	9	10	Final
Saskatchewan (Metz) 🔨	0	1	0	1	0	0	1	0	X	X	3
Ontario (Steski)	1	0	3	0	2	1	0	1	X	X	8

Sheet F	1	2	3	4	5	6	7	8	9	10	Final
Newfoundland (Peddigrew) 🔨	2	0	0	1	0	0	0	0	1	0	4
Prince Edward Island (Matheson)	0	1	0	0	2	0	1	0	0	1	5

==== Draw 8 ====
Sheet A	1	2	3	4	5	6	7	8	9	10	Final
Northern Ontario (Repay) 🔨	0	0	0	0	1	0	4	0	1	X	6
Quebec (Ferland)	0	0	1	0	0	1	0	2	0	X	4

Sheet C	1	2	3	4	5	6	7	8	9	10	Final
Yukon/Northwest Territories (Abel) 🔨	0	0	0	0	0	0	0	1	0	X	1
Nova Scotia (Eddy)	1	1	2	1	0	0	0	0	0	X	5

Sheet E	1	2	3	4	5	6	7	8	9	10	Final
British Columbia (Dezura) 🔨	2	0	0	0	1	0	2	1	0	X	6
New Brunswick (Sullivan)	0	0	1	0	0	1	0	0	0	X	2

==== Draw 9 ====
Sheet A	1	2	3	4	5	6	7	8	9	10	11	Final
Prince Edward Island (Matheson) 🔨	0	1	1	1	0	2	0	0	0	1	2	8
Manitoba (Kirkness)	2	0	0	0	2	0	0	0	2	0	0	6

Sheet C	1	2	3	4	5	6	7	8	9	10	Final
Saskatchewan (Metz) 🔨	1	1	0	0	0	0	0	1	0	X	3
Newfoundland (Peddigrew)	0	0	2	1	0	1	0	0	0	X	4

Sheet F	1	2	3	4	5	6	7	8	9	10	Final
Alberta (Schlender) 🔨	0	1	1	0	0	0	0	0	0	1	3
Ontario (Steski)	0	0	0	1	0	0	0	0	1	0	2

==== Draw 10 ====
Sheet B	1	2	3	4	5	6	7	8	9	10	Final
Quebec (Ferland) 🔨	0	0	2	0	0	2	0	0	0	0	4
British Columbia (Dezura)	0	1	0	0	1	0	3	0	0	2	7

Sheet D	1	2	3	4	5	6	7	8	9	10	Final
Yukon/Northwest Territories (Odian) 🔨	0	1	0	1	0	2	0	1	0	1	6
New Brunswick (Sullivan)	1	0	3	0	1	0	0	0	0	0	5

Sheet E	1	2	3	4	5	6	7	8	9	10	Final
Northern Ontario (Repay) 🔨	2	2	0	0	0	2	0	2	0	1	9
Nova Scotia (Eddy)	0	0	2	1	1	0	2	0	1	0	7

==== Draw 11 ====
Sheet A	1	2	3	4	5	6	7	8	9	10	Final
Saskatchewan (Metz) 🔨	0	0	1	0	0	0	0	X	X	X	1
Nova Scotia (Eddy)	1	1	0	2	1	1	3	X	X	X	9

Sheet B	1	2	3	4	5	6	7	8	9	10	Final
Ontario (Steski) 🔨	0	0	2	0	0	0	0	1	1	0	4
New Brunswick (Sullivan)	1	1	0	0	1	2	0	0	0	0	5

Sheet C	1	2	3	4	5	6	7	8	9	10	Final
Northern Ontario (Repay) 🔨	0	2	0	0	1	0	1	0	0	X	4
Alberta (Schlender)	1	0	0	2	0	1	0	0	2	X	6

Sheet D	1	2	3	4	5	6	7	8	9	10	Final
Newfoundland (Peddigrew) 🔨	0	1	0	0	0	0	1	0	X	X	2
British Columbia (Dezura)	1	0	2	1	1	1	0	2	X	X	8

Sheet E	1	2	3	4	5	6	7	8	9	10	11	Final
Manitoba (Kirkness) 🔨	0	2	0	0	1	1	0	1	0	1	1	7
Quebec (Ferland)	0	0	0	1	0	0	2	0	3	0	0	6

Sheet F	1	2	3	4	5	6	7	8	9	10	Final
Prince Edward Island (Matheson) 🔨	1	0	0	1	0	0	1	0	0	X	3
Yukon/Northwest Territories (Odian)	0	0	0	0	0	1	0	1	0	X	2

==== Draw 13 ====
Sheet A	1	2	3	4	5	6	7	8	9	10	Final
New Brunswick (Sullivan) 🔨	0	0	1	1	0	2	0	1	0	X	5
Newfoundland (Peddigrew)	0	2	0	0	2	0	2	0	3	X	9

Sheet B	1	2	3	4	5	6	7	8	9	10	Final
Alberta (Schlender) 🔨	0	0	0	0	0	2	1	0	0	0	3
Quebec (Ferland)	0	0	0	1	1	0	0	1	0	1	4

Sheet C	1	2	3	4	5	6	7	8	9	10	Final
Nova Scotia (Eddy) 🔨	0	1	0	1	0	1	0	1	0	X	4
Prince Edward Island (Matheson)	0	0	3	0	1	0	2	0	1	X	7

Sheet D	1	2	3	4	5	6	7	8	9	10	Final
Manitoba (Kirkness) 🔨	1	0	0	0	0	0	1	0	0	X	2
Northern Ontario (Repay)	0	0	0	0	0	2	0	2	0	X	4

Sheet E	1	2	3	4	5	6	7	8	9	10	Final
Yukon/Northwest Territories (Odian) 🔨	1	0	1	0	2	0	0	1	0	0	5
Saskatchewan (Metz)	0	2	0	1	0	2	1	0	0	1	7

Sheet F	1	2	3	4	5	6	7	8	9	10	Final
Ontario (Steski) 🔨	2	1	0	2	0	3	0	0	0	1	9
British Columbia (Dezura)	0	0	2	0	2	0	0	1	1	0	6

==== Draw 16 ====
Sheet A	1	2	3	4	5	6	7	8	9	10	11	Final
Prince Edward Island (Matheson) 🔨	1	1	0	0	1	0	0	0	0	0	3	6
Quebec (Ferland)	0	0	0	2	0	0	0	0	0	1	0	3

Sheet B	1	2	3	4	5	6	7	8	9	10	Final
Nova Scotia (Eddy) 🔨	1	2	0	0	0	2	2	0	X	X	7
Newfoundland (Peddigrew)	0	0	1	0	1	0	0	2	X	X	4

Sheet C	1	2	3	4	5	6	7	8	9	10	Final
Alberta (Schlender) 🔨	2	0	0	0	5	X	X	X	X	X	7
British Columbia (Dezura)	0	0	1	0	0	X	X	X	X	X	1

Sheet D	1	2	3	4	5	6	7	8	9	10	Final
Ontario (Steski) 🔨	1	0	0	2	0	0	0	0	1	1	5
Yukon/Northwest Territories (Odian)	0	0	1	0	0	1	0	0	0	0	2

Sheet E	1	2	3	4	5	6	7	8	9	10	Final
New Brunswick (Sullivan) 🔨	0	0	0	0	1	0	1	0	X	X	2
Manitoba (Kirkness)	0	1	1	2	0	1	0	2	X	X	7

Sheet F	1	2	3	4	5	6	7	8	9	10	Final
Saskatchewan (Metz) 🔨	0	2	0	0	1	1	0	0	1	0	5
Northern Ontario (Repay)	0	0	0	2	0	0	3	1	0	1	7

==== Draw 18 ====
Sheet A	1	2	3	4	5	6	7	8	9	10	Final
Yukon/Northwest Territories (Odian) 🔨	2	1	0	0	0	0	1	0	1	0	5
Alberta (Schlender)	0	0	1	0	1	1	0	3	0	1	7

Sheet B	1	2	3	4	5	6	7	8	9	10	Final
New Brunswick (Sullivan) 🔨	0	1	0	1	0	1	0	0	X	X	3
Saskatchewan (Metz)	1	0	2	0	3	0	0	2	X	X	8

Sheet C	1	2	3	4	5	6	7	8	9	10	Final
Quebec (Ferland) 🔨	1	0	1	0	2	0	3	0	2	0	9
Ontario (Steski)	0	2	0	1	0	1	0	2	0	0	6

Sheet D	1	2	3	4	5	6	7	8	9	10	11	Final
British Columbia (Dezura) 🔨	0	1	1	0	0	2	1	0	1	0	3	9
Prince Edward Island (Matheson)	0	0	0	1	1	0	0	2	0	2	0	6

Sheet E	1	2	3	4	5	6	7	8	9	10	11	Final
Newfoundland (Peddigrew) 🔨	0	0	0	0	2	2	0	0	0	1	0	5
Northern Ontario (Repay)	1	0	1	0	0	0	1	2	0	0	1	6

Sheet F	1	2	3	4	5	6	7	8	9	10	Final
Nova Scotia (Eddy) 🔨	0	0	1	0	2	0	2	0	0	1	6
Manitoba (Kirkness)	1	0	0	1	0	1	0	1	0	0	4

==== Draw 19 ====
Sheet A	1	2	3	4	5	6	7	8	9	10	Final
Manitoba (Kirkness) 🔨	0	1	0	1	0	1	0	X	X	X	3
British Columbia (Dezura)	3	0	2	0	2	0	1	X	X	X	8

Sheet B	1	2	3	4	5	6	7	8	9	10	Final
Prince Edward Island (Matheson) 🔨	0	0	1	1	0	1	0	1	0	0	4
Northern Ontario (Repay)	3	1	0	0	1	0	1	0	0	1	7

Sheet C	1	2	3	4	5	6	7	8	9	10	Final
Newfoundland (Peddigrew) 🔨	1	1	0	0	0	0	0	0	3	0	5
Yukon/Northwest Territories (Odian)	0	0	0	1	1	1	0	2	0	1	6

Sheet D	1	2	3	4	5	6	7	8	9	10	Final
Quebec (Ferland) 🔨	1	0	0	1	0	1	0	1	0	X	4
Saskatchewan (Metz)	0	0	0	0	1	0	0	0	0	X	1

Sheet E	1	2	3	4	5	6	7	8	9	10	Final
Nova Scotia (Eddy) 🔨	1	0	0	0	0	1	0	2	1	0	5
Ontario (Steski)	0	1	2	0	0	0	2	0	0	1	6

Sheet F	1	2	3	4	5	6	7	8	9	10	11	Final
New Brunswick (Sullivan) 🔨	0	2	0	1	0	0	1	0	1	0	1	6
Alberta (Schlender)	0	0	1	0	0	2	0	1	0	1	0	5

==== Draw 21 ====
Sheet A	1	2	3	4	5	6	7	8	9	10	Final
Ontario (Steski) 🔨	0	3	1	0	2	0	0	0	3	X	9
Northern Ontario (Repay)	0	0	0	1	0	0	0	1	0	X	2

Sheet B	1	2	3	4	5	6	7	8	9	10	Final
Yukon/Northwest Territories (Odian) 🔨	0	2	1	0	1	0	0	1	0	0	5
Manitoba (Kirkness)	1	0	0	2	0	1	0	0	0	4	8

Sheet C	1	2	3	4	5	6	7	8	9	10	Final
Prince Edward Island (Matheson) 🔨	1	0	0	0	1	0	1	0	1	0	4
New Brunswick (Sullivan)	0	0	1	0	0	2	0	2	0	0	5

Sheet D	1	2	3	4	5	6	7	8	9	10	11	Final
Alberta (Schlender) 🔨	1	0	0	0	2	1	2	1	0	0	1	8
Nova Scotia (Eddy)	0	0	5	1	0	0	0	0	0	1	0	7

Sheet E	1	2	3	4	5	6	7	8	9	10	Final
Saskatchewan (Metz) 🔨	0	1	0	1	0	0	0	1	0	X	3
British Columbia (Dezura)	1	0	1	0	2	0	2	0	3	X	9

Sheet F	1	2	3	4	5	6	7	8	9	10	Final
Quebec (Ferland) 🔨	1	0	1	1	0	1	0	4	0	X	8
Newfoundland (Peddigrew)	0	3	0	0	0	0	2	0	2	X	7

=== Playoffs ===
Semifinal		Final
Northern Ontario	7
British Columbia	4	Alberta	2
		Northern Ontario	4

==== Semifinal ====
Sheet D	1	2	3	4	5	6	7	8	9	10	11	Final
Northern Ontario (Repay) 🔨	1	0	0	0	1	1	0	0	0	1	3	7
British Columbia (Dezura)	0	2	1	0	0	0	0	0	1	0	0	4

Player percentages
Northern Ontario		British Columbia	
Trevor Clifford	74%	Andrew Paul	77%
Scott McCallum	84%	Scott Gregory	82%
Aaron Skillen	78%	Stewart Glynes	85%
Jason Repay	81%	Grant Dezura	70%
Total	79%	Total	79%

==== Final ====
Sheet C	1	2	3	4	5	6	7	8	9	10	Final
Alberta (Schlender) 🔨	0	0	0	0	0	0	1	0	1	0	2
Northern Ontario (Repay)	0	0	0	0	0	1	0	2	0	1	4

Player percentages
Alberta		Northern Ontario	
Craig Waples	88%	Trevor Clifford	86%
Greg Lahti	83%	Scott McCallum	83%
Jeff Wieschorster	73%	Aaron Skillen	81%
Rob Schlender	74%	Jason Repay	79%
Total	79%	Total	82%

== Women's ==
=== Teams ===
Province / Territory	Skip	Third	Second	Lead
Alberta	Tara Brandt	Nikki Handfield	Shannon Hall	Nikki Lamb
Northwest Territories/Yukon	Janet Sian	Samantha Bohnet	Coralee Hamer	Pamela Bohnet
New Brunswick	Heather Smith	Denise Cormier	Susanne LeBlanc	Lesley Hicks
Manitoba	Jill Staub	Jennifer Jones	Kristie Moroz	Kelly MacKenzie
Prince Edward Island	Lynn Ann Callaghan	Rebecca Jean MacPhee	Susie Roberts	Lou Ann Henry
British Columbia	Allison MacInnes	Renee Lemke	Sarah Eden	Jeanna Richard
Nova Scotia	Susan Lowther	Katherine Lowther	Marsha Wier (skip)	Sara Durling
Ontario	Deborah Green	Kim Gellard	Lisa Rowsell	Corrine Beveridge
Newfoundland	Sheila Ducey	Gina Stanley	Paula McLean	Rhonda Rogers
Quebec	Brenda Nicholls	Katie Arsenault (skip)	Melanie Filion	Genevieve le Sieur
Northern Ontario	Tara Coulterman	Melody Farkas	Amy Uhryn	Jennifer Smith
Saskatchewan	Shellan Baranieski	Shari Pagan	Melissa Haveroen	Patricia Walter

=== Standings ===
Locale	Skip	W	L
Manitoba	Jill Staub	10	1
Alberta	Tara Brandt	9	2
New Brunswick	Heather Smith	8	3
Saskatchewan	Shelan Baranieski	7	4
Quebec	Katie Arsenault	6	5
Ontario	Deborah Green	5	6
Northern Ontario	Tara Coulterman	5	6
Nova Scotia	Marsha Wier	5	6
Prince Edward Island	Lynn Ann Callaghan	4	7
British Columbia	Allison MacInnes	4	7
Newfoundland	Sheila Ducey	3	8
Northwest Territories/Yukon	Janet Sian	0	11

=== Results ===
==== Draw 1 ====
Sheet A	1	2	3	4	5	6	7	8	9	10	Final
Alberta (Brandt) 🔨	1	1	0	1	0	0	0	2	2	1	8
Saskatchewan (Baranieski)	0	0	0	0	1	1	4	0	0	0	6

Sheet D	1	2	3	4	5	6	7	8	9	10	Final
Manitoba (Staub) 🔨	2	1	0	1	0	4	0	1	1	X	10
Newfoundland (Ducey)	0	0	2	0	1	0	2	0	0	X	5

Sheet E	1	2	3	4	5	6	7	8	9	10	Final
Prince Edward Island (Callaghan) 🔨	0	0	1	0	1	2	0	0	2	0	6
Ontario (Green)	1	1	0	1	0	0	1	1	0	2	7

==== Draw 2 ====
Sheet B	1	2	3	4	5	6	7	8	9	10	Final
Northern Ontario (Coulterman) 🔨	0	1	2	3	0	1	0	2	2	X	11
Northwest Territories/Yukon (Sian)	1	0	0	0	0	0	1	0	0	X	2

Sheet C	1	2	3	4	5	6	7	8	9	10	Final
New Brunswick (Smith) 🔨	0	0	0	1	1	0	1	0	2	X	5
Quebec (Arsenault)	0	0	1	0	0	1	0	1	0	X	3

Sheet F	1	2	3	4	5	6	7	8	9	10	Final
British Columbia (MacInnes) 🔨	1	0	0	2	1	0	2	1	1	X	8
Nova Scotia (Wier)	0	0	1	0	0	1	0	0	0	X	2

==== Draw 3 ====
Sheet B	1	2	3	4	5	6	7	8	9	10	Final
Saskatchewan (Baranieski) 🔨	0	0	1	0	1	1	0	0	0	2	5
Prince Edward Island (Callaghan)	0	0	0	1	0	0	2	1	0	0	4

Sheet C	1	2	3	4	5	6	7	8	9	10	Final
Ontario (Green) 🔨	0	1	0	2	0	2	0	0	0	X	5
Manitoba (Staub)	0	0	2	0	1	0	1	2	1	X	7

Sheet E	1	2	3	4	5	6	7	8	9	10	Final
Newfoundland (Ducey) 🔨	0	2	0	2	0	1	0	2	0	X	7
Alberta (Brandt)	1	0	1	0	0	0	3	0	1	X	6

==== Draw 4 ====
Sheet A	1	2	3	4	5	6	7	8	9	10	Final
Northwest Territories/Yukon (Sian) 🔨	1	0	0	0	0	1	0	0	1	X	3
British Columbia (MacInnes)	0	2	1	0	0	0	1	1	0	X	5

Sheet D	1	2	3	4	5	6	7	8	9	10	11	Final
Nova Scotia (Wier) 🔨	0	0	0	1	0	1	0	0	1	0	1	4
Quebec (Arsenault)	0	0	1	0	0	0	1	0	0	1	0	3

Sheet F	1	2	3	4	5	6	7	8	9	10	Final
Northern Ontario (Coulterman) 🔨	0	0	2	0	1	0	0	1	0	X	4
New Brunswick (Smith)	1	0	0	3	0	1	0	0	5	X	10

==== Draw 5 ====
Sheet B	1	2	3	4	5	6	7	8	9	10	Final
Newfoundland (Ducey) 🔨	1	0	0	1	0	1	0	1	0	X	4
Ontario (Green)	0	2	1	0	1	0	1	0	0	X	5

Sheet D	1	2	3	4	5	6	7	8	9	10	Final
Prince Edward Island (Callaghan) 🔨	1	0	1	1	0	2	0	1	1	0	7
Alberta (Brandt)	0	4	0	0	1	0	2	0	0	1	8

Sheet F	1	2	3	4	5	6	7	8	9	10	Final
Manitoba (Staub) 🔨	0	1	0	2	0	1	0	0	2	X	6
Saskatchewan (Baranieski)	0	0	0	0	1	0	1	0	0	X	2

==== Draw 6 ====
Sheet A	1	2	3	4	5	6	7	8	9	10	Final
Nova Scotia (Wier) 🔨	0	2	0	0	0	2	0	1	0	X	5
New Brunswick (Smith)	0	0	0	2	1	0	2	0	2	X	7

Sheet C	1	2	3	4	5	6	7	8	9	10	11	Final
British Columbia (MacInnes) 🔨	0	0	0	0	2	0	0	2	1	1	0	6
Northern Ontario (Coulterman)	1	1	0	1	0	0	3	0	0	0	1	7

Sheet E	1	2	3	4	5	6	7	8	9	10	Final
Quebec (Arsenault) 🔨	1	1	1	0	0	2	1	1	1	X	8
Northwest Territories/Yukon (Sian)	0	0	0	0	0	0	0	0	0	X	0

==== Draw 7 ====
Sheet A	1	2	3	4	5	6	7	8	9	10	Final
Northern Ontario (Coulterman) 🔨	0	0	2	0	0	1	1	0	1	0	5
Quebec (Arsenault)	0	0	0	2	2	0	0	1	0	3	8

Sheet C	1	2	3	4	5	6	7	8	9	10	Final
Northwest Territories/Yukon (Sian) 🔨	0	0	1	0	0	0	0	X	X	X	1
Nova Scotia (Wier)	1	1	0	2	2	2	1	X	X	X	9

Sheet E	1	2	3	4	5	6	7	8	9	10	Final
British Columbia (MacInnes) 🔨	1	0	2	0	0	2	1	0	2	0	8
New Brunswick (Smith)	0	1	0	4	1	0	0	2	0	1	9

==== Draw 8 ====
Sheet B	1	2	3	4	5	6	7	8	9	10	Final
Manitoba (Staub) 🔨	1	0	0	1	1	0	1	0	0	X	4
Alberta (Brandt)	0	0	2	0	0	2	0	0	2	X	6

Sheet D	1	2	3	4	5	6	7	8	9	10	Final
Ontario (Green) 🔨	1	0	0	0	1	0	1	0	0	X	3
Saskatchewan (Baranieski)	0	2	1	0	0	2	0	3	1	X	9

Sheet F	1	2	3	4	5	6	7	8	9	10	Final
Newfoundland (Ducey) 🔨	0	1	2	4	0	2	X	X	X	X	9
Prince Edward Island (Callaghan)	1	0	0	0	1	0	X	X	X	X	2

==== Draw 9 ====
Sheet B	1	2	3	4	5	6	7	8	9	10	11	Final
Quebec (Arsenault) 🔨	2	0	1	1	1	0	0	0	1	0	1	7
British Columbia (MacInnes)	0	0	0	0	0	2	1	1	0	2	0	6

Sheet D	1	2	3	4	5	6	7	8	9	10	Final
New Brunswick (Smith) 🔨	2	0	3	0	1	0	3	1	X	X	10
Northwest Territories/Yukon (Sian)	0	1	0	1	0	1	0	0	X	X	3

Sheet E	1	2	3	4	5	6	7	8	9	10	Final
Northern Ontario (Coulterman) 🔨	1	0	2	1	0	0	2	0	0	1	7
Nova Scotia (Wier)	0	2	0	0	0	1	0	1	1	0	5

==== Draw 10 ====
Sheet A	1	2	3	4	5	6	7	8	9	10	Final
Prince Edward Island (Callaghan) 🔨	0	1	0	0	0	0	X	X	X	X	1
Manitoba (Staub)	1	0	2	3	2	3	X	X	X	X	11

Sheet C	1	2	3	4	5	6	7	8	9	10	Final
Saskatchewan (Baranieski) 🔨	0	2	0	0	0	1	1	1	1	X	6
Newfoundland (Ducey)	0	0	1	1	0	0	0	0	0	X	2

Sheet F	1	2	3	4	5	6	7	8	9	10	11	Final
Alberta (Brandt) 🔨	0	2	0	2	1	0	1	0	3	0	2	11
Ontario (Green)	1	0	2	0	0	2	0	3	0	1	0	9

==== Draw 12 ====
Sheet A	1	2	3	4	5	6	7	8	9	10	Final
Saskatchewan (Baranieski) 🔨	0	3	2	1	0	1	1	0	1	X	9
Nova Scotia (Wier)	2	0	0	0	1	0	0	1	0	X	4

Sheet B	1	2	3	4	5	6	7	8	9	10	Final
Ontario (Green) 🔨	1	0	0	2	0	0	0	0	0	X	3
New Brunswick (Smith)	0	1	0	0	0	1	1	1	4	X	8

Sheet C	1	2	3	4	5	6	7	8	9	10	Final
Alberta (Brandt) 🔨	1	2	0	0	0	1	0	2	0	X	6
Northern Ontario (Coulterman)	0	0	2	1	0	0	1	0	1	X	5

Sheet D	1	2	3	4	5	6	7	8	9	10	Final
Newfoundland (Ducey) 🔨	0	0	1	0	1	0	0	X	X	X	2
British Columbia (MacInnes)	0	1	0	1	0	4	4	X	X	X	10

Sheet E	1	2	3	4	5	6	7	8	9	10	Final
Manitoba (Staub) 🔨	1	0	1	0	2	0	1	1	0	X	6
Quebec (Arsenault)	0	2	0	1	0	1	0	0	1	X	5

Sheet F	1	2	3	4	5	6	7	8	9	10	Final
Prince Edward Island (Callaghan) 🔨	2	0	0	0	1	0	1	3	0	X	7
Northwest Territories/Yukon (Sian)	0	0	0	0	0	2	0	0	1	X	3

==== Draw 14 ====
Sheet A	1	2	3	4	5	6	7	8	9	10	Final
Newfoundland (Ducey) 🔨	0	2	0	1	0	1	0	0	1	X	5
New Brunswick (Smith)	0	0	2	0	2	0	3	0	0	X	7

Sheet B	1	2	3	4	5	6	7	8	9	10	Final
Alberta (Brandt) 🔨	0	2	0	3	5	X	X	X	X	X	10
Quebec (Arsenault)	0	0	1	0	0	X	X	X	X	X	1

Sheet C	1	2	3	4	5	6	7	8	9	10	11	Final
Saskatchewan (Baranieski) 🔨	1	0	1	0	1	1	0	0	1	0	1	6
Northwest Territories/Yukon (Sian)	0	1	0	3	0	0	0	0	0	1	0	5

Sheet D	1	2	3	4	5	6	7	8	9	10	Final
Northern Ontario (Coulterman) 🔨	0	0	1	1	0	1	0	2	1	0	6
Manitoba (Staub)	2	1	0	0	2	0	2	0	0	1	8

Sheet E	1	2	3	4	5	6	7	8	9	10	Final
Nova Scotia (Wier) 🔨	0	1	0	2	0	0	3	0	0	1	7
Prince Edward Island (Callaghan)	2	0	1	0	0	1	0	0	2	0	6

Sheet F	1	2	3	4	5	6	7	8	9	10	Final
Ontario (Green) 🔨	1	0	0	0	2	0	0	2	0	X	5
British Columbia (MacInnes)	0	2	1	0	0	2	2	0	1	X	8

==== Draw 15 ====
Sheet A	1	2	3	4	5	6	7	8	9	10	Final
Quebec (Arsenault) 🔨	0	0	0	1	1	1	0	0	1	X	4
Prince Edward Island (Callaghan)	1	2	0	0	0	0	0	2	0	X	5

Sheet B	1	2	3	4	5	6	7	8	9	10	Final
Nova Scotia (Wier) 🔨	1	0	0	1	0	1	0	0	3	X	6
Newfoundland (Ducey)	0	0	1	0	0	0	0	1	0	X	2

Sheet C	1	2	3	4	5	6	7	8	9	10	Final
Alberta (Brandt) 🔨	0	0	1	0	2	1	2	0	1	X	7
British Columbia (MacInnes)	0	0	0	1	0	0	0	1	0	X	2

Sheet D	1	2	3	4	5	6	7	8	9	10	Final
Ontario (Green) 🔨	0	1	0	0	1	0	1	0	0	2	5
Northwest Territories/Yukon (Sian)	1	0	0	1	0	2	0	0	0	0	4

Sheet E	1	2	3	4	5	6	7	8	9	10	11	Final
New Brunswick (Smith) 🔨	2	0	1	0	2	0	0	3	0	1	0	9
Manitoba (Staub)	0	1	0	2	0	2	2	0	2	0	2	11

Sheet F	1	2	3	4	5	6	7	8	9	10	Final
Saskatchewan (Baranieski) 🔨	0	2	0	1	0	0	0	2	0	0	5
Northern Ontario (Coulterman)	1	0	0	0	0	1	0	0	1	0	3

==== Draw 17 ====
Sheet A	1	2	3	4	5	6	7	8	9	10	Final
Northwest Territories/Yukon (Sian) 🔨	0	1	0	0	2	0	1	0	1	0	5
Alberta (Brandt)	0	0	2	1	0	1	0	1	0	2	7

Sheet B	1	2	3	4	5	6	7	8	9	10	Final
New Brunswick (Smith) 🔨	0	1	2	0	1	1	1	1	X	X	7
Saskatchewan (Baranieski)	0	0	0	1	0	0	0	0	X	X	1

Sheet C	1	2	3	4	5	6	7	8	9	10	Final
Quebec (Arsenault) 🔨	2	1	0	0	1	0	0	1	0	0	5
Ontario (Green)	0	0	1	0	0	1	0	0	1	1	4

Sheet D	1	2	3	4	5	6	7	8	9	10	Final
British Columbia (MacInnes) 🔨	0	0	0	0	2	1	0	1	1	0	5
Prince Edward Island (Callaghan)	1	1	0	1	0	0	1	0	0	2	6

Sheet E	1	2	3	4	5	6	7	8	9	10	11	Final
Newfoundland (Ducey) 🔨	0	1	0	0	2	0	0	0	0	2	0	5
Northern Ontario (Coulterman)	1	0	1	1	0	1	1	0	0	0	1	6

Sheet F	1	2	3	4	5	6	7	8	9	10	Final
Manitoba (Staub) 🔨	3	2	1	0	2	0	X	X	X	X	8
Nova Scotia (Wier)	0	0	0	0	0	1	X	X	X	X	1

==== Draw 20 ====
Sheet A	1	2	3	4	5	6	7	8	9	10	11	Final
Manitoba (Staub) 🔨	2	0	1	0	3	0	1	0	0	0	1	8
British Columbia (MacInnes)	0	0	0	3	0	2	0	2	0	0	0	7

Sheet B	1	2	3	4	5	6	7	8	9	10	Final
Prince Edward Island (Callaghan) 🔨	2	0	0	1	0	0	1	0	1	0	5
Northern Ontario (Coulterman)	0	0	1	0	4	1	0	1	0	1	8

Sheet C	1	2	3	4	5	6	7	8	9	10	Final
Northwest Territories/Yukon (Sian) 🔨	0	2	0	0	1	0	1	0	2	X	6
Newfoundland (Ducey)	1	0	1	1	0	4	0	2	0	X	9

Sheet D	1	2	3	4	5	6	7	8	9	10	11	Final
Quebec (Arsenault) 🔨	0	1	0	0	1	0	1	0	1	0	2	6
Saskatchewan (Baranieski)	0	0	0	0	0	2	0	0	0	2	0	4

Sheet E	1	2	3	4	5	6	7	8	9	10	Final
Nova Scotia (Wier) 🔨	0	0	0	1	0	0	0	0	1	X	2
Ontario (Green)	1	0	0	0	2	0	1	1	0	X	5

Sheet F	1	2	3	4	5	6	7	8	9	10	Final
New Brunswick (Smith) 🔨	2	1	0	0	0	2	0	0	1	1	7
Alberta (Brandt)	0	0	2	0	1	0	2	3	0	0	8

==== Draw 22 ====
Sheet A	1	2	3	4	5	6	7	8	9	10	Final
Ontario (Green) 🔨	0	4	1	3	0	1	X	X	X	X	9
Northern Ontario (Coulterman)	0	0	0	0	1	0	X	X	X	X	1

Sheet B	1	2	3	4	5	6	7	8	9	10	Final
Northwest Territories/Yukon (Sian) 🔨	0	0	2	0	0	0	0	1	0	X	3
Manitoba (Staub)	1	0	0	1	1	1	4	0	1	X	9

Sheet C	1	2	3	4	5	6	7	8	9	10	Final
Prince Edward Island (Callaghan) 🔨	0	0	2	0	3	0	0	0	0	2	7
New Brunswick (Smith)	2	1	0	1	0	1	0	1	0	0	6

Sheet D	1	2	3	4	5	6	7	8	9	10	Final
Alberta (Brandt) 🔨	0	0	0	0	0	0	1	0	1	0	2
Nova Scotia (Wier)	1	0	0	0	0	1	0	1	0	0	3

Sheet E	1	2	3	4	5	6	7	8	9	10	Final
British Columbia (MacInnes) 🔨	0	0	0	1	0	2	0	0	0	X	3
Saskatchewan (Baranieski)	0	1	0	0	2	0	0	0	2	X	5

Sheet F	1	2	3	4	5	6	7	8	9	10	Final
Quebec (Arsenault) 🔨	0	1	0	0	0	0	2	2	2	X	7
Newfoundland (Ducey)	1	0	1	1	2	0	0	0	0	X	5

=== Playoffs ===
Semifinal		Final
Alberta	3
New Brunswick	4	Manitoba	4
		New Brunswick	5

==== Semifinal ====
Sheet C	1	2	3	4	5	6	7	8	9	10	Final
Alberta (Brandt) 🔨	0	0	1	0	2	0	0	0	0	0	3
New Brunswick (Smith)	0	1	0	1	0	0	1	0	0	1	4

Player percentages
Alberta		New Brunswick	
Nikki Lamb	76%	Lesley Hicks	71%
Shannon Hall	74%	Susanne LeBlanc	68%
Nikki Handfield	75%	Denise Cormier	66%
Tara Brandt	68%	Heather Smith	78%
Total	73%	Total	71%

==== Final ====
Sheet D	1	2	3	4	5	6	7	8	9	10	11	Final
Manitoba (Staub)	2	0	0	1	0	1	0	0	0	0	0	4
New Brunswick (Smith) 🔨	0	0	1	0	1	0	1	1	0	0	1	5

Player percentages
Manitoba		New Brunswick	
Kelly MacKenzie	77%	Lesley Hicks	86%
Kristie Moroz	65%	Susanne LeBlanc	85%
Jennifer Jones	81%	Denise Cormier	81%
Jill Staub	76%	Heather Smith	75%
Total	75%	Total	82%
