= Heather Smith (curler) =

Canadian curler

- Curler
- Born: Heather Smith; September 21, 1972 (age 54); Sackville, New Brunswick, Canada

Team
- Curling club: Mayflower CC, Halifax, NS

Curling career
- Member Association: New Brunswick (1990–2000; 2023); Nova Scotia (2000–present); Ontario (2013)
- Hearts: 7 (2000, 2004, 2011, 2012, 2014, 2023, 2024)
- Top CTRS ranking: 18th (2003–04, 2013–14)
Medal record
Women's curling
Representing Nova Scotia
Scotties Tournament of Hearts
| Bronze medal – third place | 2011 Charlottetown |
Canadian Mixed Doubles Championships
| Bronze medal – third place | 2013 Leduc |
| Bronze medal – third place | 2014 Ottawa |
Representing Ontario
Canadian Olympic Trials
| Bronze medal – third place | 2013 Winnipeg |

Heather Smith (born September 21, 1972 in Sackville, New Brunswick) is a Canadian curler from Fall River, Nova Scotia. While married to Brier champion Mark Dacey, she was known as Heather Smith-Dacey.

== Career ==
=== 1990–2000 ===
Smith grew up in Sackville, New Brunswick. She won two provincial junior championships, in 1990 as a third for Krista Smith and in 1991 as a skip. At the 1990 Canadian Junior Curling Championships, the team finished with a 5-5 record in 5th place. However, Smith won the 1991 Canadian Junior Curling Championships. After the round robin, the team finished third with an 8-3 record. However, the team won both the semifinal match against Alberta's Tara Brandt and then in the final against Manitoba's Jill Staub. It would be the first Women's junior title for New Brunswick. Smith and her team of Denise Cormier, Susanne LeBlanc and Lesley Hicks were off the 1992 World Junior Curling Championships in Oberstdorf, Germany. At the World Juniors, the team finished in 5th place with a 5-4 record.

Smith also played for New Brunswick at the 1991 Canada Games, finishing fifth.

From 1993 to 1996, Smith won four straight provincial mixed titles as the third for Grant Odishaw. The team won the 1994 Canadian Mixed Curling Championship, the first mixed title for New Brunswick.

=== 2000–2010 ===
Smith then moved to Halifax, Nova Scotia and began competing there. In the meantime, she met and married Saskatchewan curler Mark Dacey, who would move to Halifax to live with her. She would win five provincial mixed titles playing third for her then-husband, Mark (2000, 2001, 2002, 2008, 2009). She won the Canadian Mixed Curling Championship in 2002 and in 2010. She and Dacey were selected to represent Canada at the 2010 World Mixed Doubles Curling Championship, but could not go due to the air travel disruption after the 2010 Eyjafjallajökull eruption. Smith has also won three provincial women's titles: in 2000 playing third for Kay Zinck and as skip in 2004 and 2011. At the 2000 Scott Tournament of Hearts, her team lost in a tie breaker to the eventual winner Kelley Law of British Columbia, after posting a 7-4 record. At the 2004 Scott Tournament of Hearts, she finished with a 6-5 record.

=== 2011–current ===
For the 2010/2011 season, Smith and her team of Blisse Comstock and Teri Lake asked Colleen Jones to replace their former skip Jill Mouzar, who had moved to Ontario. Days before the qualification round for the 2011 Nova Scotia Scotties Tournament of Hearts began, Jones fell ill to meningitis. The team made the decision to move Smith to the skip position, and added Danielle Parsons to the team at third. They would win the provincial title and go on to the 2011 Scotties Tournament of Hearts, where they finished with a 7-4 record. This was enough to secure a place in a tie breaker against Kelly Scott of British Columbia. The Nova Scotian team won the tiebreaker and moved on to face Ontario's Rachel Homan in the 3-4 game. They lost the game to Homan, but met them again in the Bronze medal game, after Homan lost the semi-final. In the bronze medal game, Smith and her team defeated Homan and placed third overall at the tournament.

After a successful year together, the team decided to continue without Jones for the 2011/2012 season. Smith and team participated in the 2012 Nova Scotia Scotties Tournament of Hearts where once again they won the right to represent Nova Scotia at the 2012 Scotties Tournament of Hearts. At the event, Smith and team found themselves struggling to succeed in comparison to the year prior, and finished round robin with a disappointing 4-7 record.

At the end of the 2011-12 curling season, Parsons left the team. Smith added Stephanie McVicar, to the team playing third for the 2012-13 season.

For the 2013 Canadian Olympic Curling Trials, The Rachel Homan team asked Smith to be the alternate for them during that tournament. The team finished third after losing to Sherry Middaugh in the semi-finals.

== Personal life ==
Smith separated from Dacey in 2013. She has two children. She currently works as an account manager for Benjamin Bridge Winery and is a business owner for Arbonne International and Live More Lifestyle.

== Grand Slam record ==
Key
| C | Champion |
| F | Lost in Final |
| SF | Lost in Semifinal |
| QF | Lost in Quarterfinals |
| R16 | Lost in the round of 16 |
| Q | Did not advance to playoffs |
| T2 | Played in Tier 2 event |
| DNP | Did not participate in event |
| N/A | Not a Grand Slam event that season |

| Event | 2008–09 | 2009–10 | 2010–11 | 2011–12 | 2012–13 |
|---|---|---|---|---|---|
| Autumn Gold | Q | Q | DNP | DNP | Q |
| Manitoba Lotteries | DNP | DNP | Q | Q | Q |
| Masters | N/A | N/A | N/A | N/A | T2 |
| Sobeys Slam | Q | N/A | Q | N/A | N/A |
