= 2004 Canadian Mixed Curling Championship =

- Host city: Schumacher, Timmins, Ontario
- Arena: McIntyre Curling Club
- Dates: January 10–18, 2004
- Winner: Alberta
- Curling club: Calgary Winter Club
- Skip: Shannon Kleibrink
- Third: Richard Kleibrink
- Second: Judy Pendergast
- Lead: Kevin Pendergast
- Finalist: Ontario (Heath McCormick)

The 2004 Canadian Mixed Curling Championship was held January 10–18, 2004 at the McIntyre Curling Club in Timmins, Ontario.

The 2004 Mixed was the last Canadian Mixed Championship to be held in the same calendar year as it was billed as, until 2021. The 2005 Canadian Mixed Curling Championship would be held in November 2004.

Shannon Kleibrink, skip of the Alberta team became the first (and to date only) woman to skip a team to national mixed title, when her foursome defeated Ontario's Heath McCormick in the final.

== Teams ==
Locale	Skip	Third	Second	Lead
Alberta	Shannon Kleibrink	Richard Kleibrink	Judy Pendergast	Kevin Pendergast
British Columbia	Fred Thomson	Heather Griffiths	Brent Pihowich	Allison Hurley
Manitoba	Terry McNamee	Jill Officer	Brendan Taylor	Tanya Robins
New Brunswick	Charlie Sullivan, Jr.	Sandy Comeau	Paul Nason	Stacey Leger
Newfoundland and Labrador	Gary Oke	Anna Mae Holden	Scott Davidge	Sandra Sparrow
Northern Ontario	Tim Phillips	Dawn Schwar	Gilles Allaire	Janice Vettoretti
Nova Scotia	Steve Ogden	Monica Moriarty	Jack Robar	Marg Cutcliffe
Ontario	Heath McCormick	Denna Schell	Jason Young	Julie Promoli
Prince Edward Island	John Likely	Janice MacCallum	Mark Butler	Nancy Cameron
Quebec	Steven Munroe	Nancy Dore	Philippe Brassard	Judy Dore
Saskatchewan	Randy Gilewich	Michelle Englot	Pat Simmons	Cindy Simmons
Northwest Territories/Yukon	Kevin Whitehead	Stacey Stabel	Brad Whitehead	Alana Fisher

== Standings ==
Province	Skip	Wins	Losses
Alberta	Shannon Kleibrink	9	2
Ontario	Heath McCormick	7	4
Manitoba	Terry McNamee	7	4
Quebec	Steven Munroe	7	4
New Brunswick	Charlie Sullivan, Jr.	6	5
Nova Scotia	Steve Ogden	6	5
Newfoundland and Labrador	Gary Oke	6	5
Northern Ontario	Tim Phillips	5	6
Saskatchewan	Randy Gilewich	5	6
British Columbia	Fred Thomson	5	6
Prince Edward Island	John Likely	3	8
Northwest Territories/Yukon	Kevin Whitehead	0	11

== Results ==
=== Draw 1 ===
Sheet A	1	2	3	4	5	6	7	8	9	10	Final
British Columbia (Thomson)	0	1	0	0	2	1	0	X	X	X	4
Quebec (Munroe) 🔨	3	0	4	2	0	0	4	X	X	X	13

Sheet B	1	2	3	4	5	6	7	8	9	10	Final
Northwest Territories/Yukon (Whitehead) 🔨	0	1	0	0	0	0	0	X	X	X	1
Manitoba (McNamee)	2	0	3	3	1	3	1	X	X	X	13

Sheet C	1	2	3	4	5	6	7	8	9	10	Final
Northern Ontario (Phillips) 🔨	0	1	0	1	1	0	1	0	0	0	4
New Brunswick (Sullivan)	0	0	2	0	0	2	0	1	0	1	6

Sheet D	1	2	3	4	5	6	7	8	9	10	Final
Ontario (McCormick)	0	0	0	3	0	1	1	2	1	X	8
Nova Scotia (Ogden) 🔨	1	1	1	0	1	0	0	0	0	X	4

Sheet E	1	2	3	4	5	6	7	8	9	10	11	Final
Saskatchewan (Gilewich) 🔨	1	0	1	1	0	2	0	0	0	0	3	8
Newfoundland and Labrador (Oke)	0	1	0	0	1	0	1	1	0	1	0	5

Sheet F	1	2	3	4	5	6	7	8	9	10	Final
Alberta (Kleibrink)	0	2	0	1	0	2	0	0	2	1	8
Prince Edward Island (Likely) 🔨	1	0	2	0	1	0	0	1	0	0	5

=== Draw 2 ===
Sheet A	1	2	3	4	5	6	7	8	9	10	Final
Prince Edward Island (Likely) 🔨	0	1	2	0	1	0	1	1	0	0	6
Saskatchewan (Gilewich)	0	0	0	2	0	2	0	0	4	2	10

Sheet B	1	2	3	4	5	6	7	8	9	10	Final
Newfoundland and Labrador (Oke) 🔨	2	2	0	1	0	2	0	0	1	1	9
Ontario (McCormick)	0	0	2	0	2	0	1	2	0	0	7

Sheet C	1	2	3	4	5	6	7	8	9	10	Final
Nova Scotia (Ogden) 🔨	0	1	0	0	0	2	0	2	0	5	10
Northern Ontario (Phillips)	1	0	0	1	0	0	2	0	2	0	6

Sheet D	1	2	3	4	5	6	7	8	9	10	Final
New Brunswick (Sullivan) 🔨	3	0	1	4	0	1	0	1	X	X	10
Northwest Territories/Yukon (Whitehead)	0	0	0	0	1	0	2	0	X	X	3

Sheet E	1	2	3	4	5	6	7	8	9	10	Final
Alberta (Kleibrink) 🔨	1	0	0	1	0	2	0	3	0	1	8
British Columbia (Thomson)	0	1	1	0	1	0	1	0	2	0	6

Sheet F	1	2	3	4	5	6	7	8	9	10	Final
Manitoba (McNamee) 🔨	1	0	4	0	3	0	0	0	X	X	8
Quebec (Munroe)	0	1	0	1	0	0	1	0	X	X	3

=== Draw 3 ===
Sheet A	1	2	3	4	5	6	7	8	9	10	Final
Quebec (Munroe) 🔨	0	0	0	1	0	3	0	3	0	X	7
New Brunswick (Sullivan)	0	0	0	0	0	0	1	0	0	X	1

Sheet B	1	2	3	4	5	6	7	8	9	10	Final
British Columbia (Thomson) 🔨	0	1	0	0	1	0	1	0	1	X	4
Manitoba (McNamee)	0	0	3	1	0	2	0	2	0	X	8

Sheet C	1	2	3	4	5	6	7	8	9	10	Final
Northwest Territories/Yukon (Whitehead) 🔨	0	2	0	0	0	0	2	0	2	0	6
Nova Scotia (Ogden)	1	0	1	1	1	2	0	1	0	1	8

Sheet D	1	2	3	4	5	6	7	8	9	10	Final
Northern Ontario (Phillips) 🔨	3	0	2	0	2	1	0	0	0	1	9
Newfoundland and Labrador (Oke)	0	2	0	3	0	0	1	2	0	0	8

Sheet E	1	2	3	4	5	6	7	8	9	10	Final
Ontario (McCormick) 🔨	1	0	3	0	1	0	4	0	0	0	9
Prince Edward Island (Likely)	0	1	0	3	0	2	0	1	0	1	8

Sheet F	1	2	3	4	5	6	7	8	9	10	11	Final
Saskatchewan (Gilewich) 🔨	2	0	0	2	2	0	0	0	1	1	0	8
Alberta (Kleibrink)	0	3	1	0	0	1	2	1	0	0	1	9

=== Draw 4 ===
Sheet A	1	2	3	4	5	6	7	8	9	10	Final
Alberta (Kleibrink) 🔨	1	0	0	0	4	0	1	0	1	1	8
Ontario (McCormick)	0	2	1	0	0	2	0	1	0	0	6

Sheet B	1	2	3	4	5	6	7	8	9	10	Final
Prince Edward Island (Likely) 🔨	1	0	2	0	1	0	2	2	0	1	9
Northern Ontario (Phillips)	0	2	0	0	0	3	0	0	1	0	6

Sheet C	1	2	3	4	5	6	7	8	9	10	Final
Newfoundland and Labrador (Oke) 🔨	2	0	1	0	0	2	5	0	X	X	10
Northwest Territories/Yukon (Whitehead)	0	2	0	0	1	0	0	1	X	X	4

Sheet D	1	2	3	4	5	6	7	8	9	10	Final
Saskatchewan (Gilewich) 🔨	0	2	0	3	1	1	0	0	1	0	8
British Columbia (Thomson)	3	0	2	0	0	0	2	1	0	1	9

Sheet E	1	2	3	4	5	6	7	8	9	10	Final
Nova Scotia (Ogden) 🔨	1	0	2	0	1	0	0	1	0	0	5
Quebec (Munroe)	0	2	0	1	0	0	1	0	0	2	6

Sheet F	1	2	3	4	5	6	7	8	9	10	Final
New Brunswick (Sullivan) 🔨	1	1	1	1	2	0	0	0	2	X	8
Manitoba (McNamee)	0	0	0	0	0	2	1	1	0	X	4

=== Draw 5 ===
Sheet A	1	2	3	4	5	6	7	8	9	10	Final
Manitoba (McNamee) 🔨	2	0	0	1	0	1	0	1	0	1	6
Nova Scotia (Ogden)	0	1	1	0	1	0	1	0	1	0	5

Sheet B	1	2	3	4	5	6	7	8	9	10	Final
Quebec (Munroe) 🔨	0	0	2	0	2	0	0	1	0	X	5
Newfoundland and Labrador (Oke)	1	1	0	1	0	3	0	0	2	X	8

Sheet C	1	2	3	4	5	6	7	8	9	10	Final
British Columbia (Thomson) 🔨	0	1	0	0	0	2	0	1	0	X	4
New Brunswick (Sullivan)	1	0	2	0	0	0	4	0	3	X	10

Sheet D	1	2	3	4	5	6	7	8	9	10	Final
Northwest Territories/Yukon (Whitehead) 🔨	1	1	0	0	1	0	0	1	1	0	5
Prince Edward Island (Likely)	0	0	2	1	0	1	0	0	0	2	6

Sheet E	1	2	3	4	5	6	7	8	9	10	Final
Northern Ontario (Phillips) 🔨	0	1	0	1	1	0	2	1	0	1	7
Alberta (Kleibrink)	0	0	1	0	0	1	0	0	2	0	4

Sheet F	1	2	3	4	5	6	7	8	9	10	Final
Ontario (McCormick) 🔨	2	0	0	1	0	1	0	3	2	X	9
Saskatchewan (Gilewich)	0	2	0	0	1	0	2	0	0	X	5

=== Draw 6 ===
Sheet A	1	2	3	4	5	6	7	8	9	10	Final
Saskatchewan (Gilewich) 🔨	2	0	2	0	0	2	1	0	1	X	8
Northern Ontario (Phillips)	0	2	0	1	0	0	0	1	0	X	4

Sheet B	1	2	3	4	5	6	7	8	9	10	Final
Alberta (Kleibrink) 🔨	0	0	1	3	2	0	2	0	0	X	8
Northwest Territories/Yukon (Whitehead)	1	2	0	0	0	1	0	1	1	X	6

Sheet C	1	2	3	4	5	6	7	8	9	10	Final
Ontario (McCormick) 🔨	2	0	0	1	0	0	3	1	0	0	7
British Columbia (Thomson)	0	1	2	0	2	1	0	0	1	1	8

Sheet D	1	2	3	4	5	6	7	8	9	10	Final
Prince Edward Island (Likely) 🔨	0	0	0	0	2	0	2	1	0	X	5
Quebec (Munroe)	1	1	1	1	0	2	0	0	3	X	9

Sheet E	1	2	3	4	5	6	7	8	9	10	Final
Newfoundland and Labrador (Oke) 🔨	3	0	1	1	0	0	1	0	2	X	8
Manitoba (McNamee)	0	1	0	0	1	1	0	1	0	X	4

Sheet F	1	2	3	4	5	6	7	8	9	10	Final
Nova Scotia (Ogden) 🔨	2	0	1	0	2	0	1	X	X	X	6
New Brunswick (Sullivan)	0	1	0	5	0	4	0	X	X	X	10

=== Draw 7 ===
Sheet A	1	2	3	4	5	6	7	8	9	10	Final
New Brunswick (Sullivan) 🔨	2	0	2	0	0	5	X	X	X	X	9
Newfoundland and Labrador (Oke)	0	1	0	2	0	0	X	X	X	X	3

Sheet B	1	2	3	4	5	6	7	8	9	10	Final
Manitoba (McNamee) 🔨	2	1	1	0	2	0	3	X	X	X	9
Prince Edward Island (Likely)	0	0	0	1	0	2	0	X	X	X	3

Sheet C	1	2	3	4	5	6	7	8	9	10	Final
Quebec (Munroe) 🔨	1	0	2	0	0	0	2	0	0	0	5
Alberta (Kleibrink)	0	2	0	2	0	1	0	0	0	2	7

Sheet D	1	2	3	4	5	6	7	8	9	10	Final
British Columbia (Thomson) 🔨	0	0	0	0	2	1	0	0	2	2	7
Nova Scotia (Ogden)	0	1	0	1	0	0	1	3	0	0	6

Sheet E	1	2	3	4	5	6	7	8	9	10	Final
Northwest Territories/Yukon (Whitehead) 🔨	1	0	0	0	1	0	0	2	0	X	4
Saskatchewan (Gilewich)	0	0	2	3	0	1	1	0	2	X	9

Sheet F	1	2	3	4	5	6	7	8	9	10	Final
Northern Ontario (Phillips) 🔨	0	2	0	1	0	1	1	0	1	1	7
Ontario (McCormick)	2	0	1	0	1	0	0	2	0	0	6

=== Draw 8 ===
Sheet A	1	2	3	4	5	6	7	8	9	10	Final
Ontario (McCormick) 🔨	0	2	2	0	3	0	6	X	X	X	13
Northwest Territories/Yukon (Whitehead)	1	0	0	1	0	2	0	X	X	X	4

Sheet B	1	2	3	4	5	6	7	8	9	10	Final
Northern Ontario (Phillips) 🔨	0	0	2	0	0	1	0	2	1	1	7
British Columbia (Thomson)	0	0	0	1	1	0	1	0	0	0	3

Sheet C	1	2	3	4	5	6	7	8	9	10	Final
Saskatchewan (Gilewich) 🔨	1	0	0	0	2	1	0	0	2	0	6
Quebec (Munroe)	0	0	2	1	0	0	0	1	0	3	7

Sheet D	1	2	3	4	5	6	7	8	9	10	Final
Alberta (Kleibrink) 🔨	2	0	1	0	1	1	0	4	X	X	9
Manitoba (McNamee)	0	1	0	1	0	0	1	0	X	X	3

Sheet E	1	2	3	4	5	6	7	8	9	10	Final
Prince Edward Island (Likely) 🔨	1	0	0	0	2	1	0	2	0	1	7
New Brunswick (Sullivan)	0	0	1	1	0	0	1	0	1	0	4

Sheet F	1	2	3	4	5	6	7	8	9	10	11	Final
Newfoundland and Labrador (Oke) 🔨	0	2	0	2	0	2	0	0	1	0	0	7
Nova Scotia (Ogden)	1	0	2	0	1	0	1	0	0	2	1	8

=== Draw 9 ===
Sheet A	1	2	3	4	5	6	7	8	9	10	Final
Nova Scotia (Ogden) 🔨	1	0	1	0	3	0	3	X	X	X	8
Prince Edward Island (Likely)	0	1	0	1	0	1	0	X	X	X	3

Sheet B	1	2	3	4	5	6	7	8	9	10	Final
New Brunswick (Sullivan) 🔨	1	0	3	0	0	1	0	0	2	0	7
Alberta (Kleibrink)	0	2	0	0	2	0	2	3	0	1	10

Sheet C	1	2	3	4	5	6	7	8	9	10	Final
Manitoba (McNamee) 🔨	2	0	3	0	1	1	0	1	0	X	8
Saskatchewan (Gilewich)	0	1	0	1	0	0	1	0	1	X	4

Sheet D	1	2	3	4	5	6	7	8	9	10	Final
Quebec (Munroe) 🔨	1	0	0	0	2	1	0	1	0	X	5
Ontario (McCormick)	0	2	3	1	0	0	1	0	2	X	9

Sheet E	1	2	3	4	5	6	7	8	9	10	Final
British Columbia (Thomson) 🔨	0	2	0	1	0	0	1	0	1	X	5
Newfoundland and Labrador (Oke)	1	0	1	0	0	3	0	3	0	X	8

Sheet F	1	2	3	4	5	6	7	8	9	10	11	Final
Northwest Territories/Yukon (Whitehead) 🔨	0	0	0	2	0	0	1	0	3	0	0	6
Northern Ontario (Phillips)	0	1	1	0	1	1	0	1	0	1	1	7

=== Draw 10 ===
Sheet A	1	2	3	4	5	6	7	8	9	10	Final
Northwest Territories/Yukon (Whitehead) 🔨	1	0	0	0	2	0	1	0	2	0	6
British Columbia (Thomson)	0	3	0	1	0	2	0	1	0	1	8

Sheet B	1	2	3	4	5	6	7	8	9	10	Final
Northern Ontario (Phillips) 🔨	0	0	2	0	2	0	1	0	2	0	7
Quebec (Munroe)	1	1	0	3	0	2	0	1	0	1	9

Sheet C	1	2	3	4	5	6	7	8	9	10	Final
Prince Edward Island (Likely) 🔨	0	0	2	0	1	0	0	2	1	0	6
Newfoundland and Labrador (Oke)	1	1	0	3	0	1	1	0	0	0	7

Sheet D	1	2	3	4	5	6	7	8	9	10	Final
Saskatchewan (Gilewich) 🔨	0	1	0	0	2	1	0	0	1	1	6
New Brunswick (Sullivan)	0	0	0	1	0	0	2	0	0	0	3

Sheet E	1	2	3	4	5	6	7	8	9	10	Final
Ontario (McCormick) 🔨	2	3	0	0	2	0	0	1	0	X	8
Manitoba (McNamee)	0	0	1	2	0	1	1	0	1	X	6

Sheet F	1	2	3	4	5	6	7	8	9	10	Final
Alberta (Kleibrink) 🔨	1	0	0	0	1	0	2	0	1	0	5
Nova Scotia (Ogden)	0	1	0	0	0	3	0	1	0	2	7

=== Draw 11 ===
Sheet A	1	2	3	4	5	6	7	8	9	10	11	Final
Newfoundland and Labrador (Oke) 🔨	0	0	1	0	0	1	0	2	0	1	0	5
Alberta (Kleibrink)	0	0	0	1	1	0	1	0	2	0	3	8

Sheet B	1	2	3	4	5	6	7	8	9	10	Final
Nova Scotia (Ogden) 🔨	1	0	2	0	2	1	1	1	X	X	8
Saskatchewan (Gilewich)	0	0	0	2	0	0	0	0	X	X	2

Sheet C	1	2	3	4	5	6	7	8	9	10	Final
New Brunswick (Sullivan) 🔨	0	0	0	1	0	2	0	0	X	X	3
Ontario (McCormick)	0	0	1	0	1	0	3	3	X	X	8

Sheet D	1	2	3	4	5	6	7	8	9	10	Final
Manitoba (McNamee) 🔨	1	0	4	2	0	0	1	0	X	X	8
Northern Ontario (Phillips)	0	1	0	0	1	1	0	0	X	X	3

Sheet E	1	2	3	4	5	6	7	8	9	10	Final
Quebec (Munroe) 🔨	1	0	1	0	0	3	1	2	0	4	12
Northwest Territories/Yukon (Whitehead)	0	1	0	3	4	0	0	0	1	0	9

Sheet F	1	2	3	4	5	6	7	8	9	10	Final
British Columbia (Thomson) 🔨	0	3	0	2	0	1	0	2	2	X	10
Prince Edward Island (Likely)	3	0	2	0	1	0	1	0	0	X	7

== Playoffs ==
Page playoff system
1	Alberta	6
2	Ontario	5
3	Manitoba	10
4	Quebec	6

Semifinal
2	Ontario	6
3	Manitoba	5

Final
1	Alberta	9
2	Ontario	5

=== 1 vs. 2 ===
Sheet D	1	2	3	4	5	6	7	8	9	10	Final
Alberta (Kleibrink) 🔨	0	1	0	0	2	0	0	1	2	0	6
Ontario (McCormick)	1	0	0	2	0	0	1	0	0	1	5

Player percentages
Alberta		Ontario	
Kevin Pendergast	78%	Julie Promoli	93%
Judy Pendergast	88%	Jason Young	85%
Richard Kleibrink	88%	Denna Schell	90%
Shannon Kleibrink	84%	Heath McCormick	89%
Total	84%	Total	89%

=== 3 vs. 4 ===
Sheet D	1	2	3	4	5	6	7	8	9	10	Final
Quebec (Munroe) 🔨	0	3	0	0	2	0	1	0	0	X	6
Manitoba (McNamee)	1	0	3	0	0	1	0	2	3	X	10

Player percentages
Quebec		Manitoba	
Judy Dore	81%	Tanya Robins	75%
Philippe Brassard	66%	Brendan Taylor	86%
Nancy Dore	69%	Jill Officer	71%
Steven Munroe	66%	Terry McNamee	74%
Total	71%	Total	77%

=== Semifinal ===
Sheet D	1	2	3	4	5	6	7	8	9	10	Final
Ontario (McCormick) 🔨	0	2	1	0	0	2	0	1	0	X	6
Manitoba (McNamee)	0	0	0	1	2	0	1	0	1	X	5

Player percentages
Ontario		Manitoba	
Julie Promoli	86%	Tanya Robins	89%
Jason Young	83%	Brendan Taylor	88%
Denna Schell	81%	Jill Officer	84%
Heath McCormick	70%	Terry McNamee	65%
Total	80%	Total	81%

=== Final ===
Sheet D	1	2	3	4	5	6	7	8	9	10	Final
Alberta (Kleibrink) 🔨	1	0	2	0	1	0	1	0	4	X	9
Ontario (McCormick)	0	1	0	1	0	2	0	1	0	X	5

Player percentages
Alberta		Ontario	
Kevin Pendergast	96%	Julie Promoli	91%
Judy Pendergast	84%	Jason Young	69%
Richard Kleibrink	86%	Denna Schell	71%
Shannon Kleibrink	71%	Heath McCormick	74%
Total	84%	Total	76%
