= 2024 Canadian Mixed Curling Championship =

- Host city: St. Catharines, Ontario
- Arena: St. Catharines Golf & Country Club
- Dates: November 3–9
- Winner: Nova Scotia
- Curling club: Halifax CC, Halifax
- Skip: Owen Purcell
- Third: Christina Black
- Second: Adam McEachren
- Lead: Jenn Baxter
- Finalist: Saskatchewan (Ackerman)

The 2024 Canadian Mixed Curling Championship was held from November 3 to 9 at the St. Catharines Golf & Country Club in St. Catharines, Ontario.

== Teams ==
The teams are listed as follows:

Team	Skip	Third	Second	Lead	Locale
Alberta	Kurt Balderston	Janais DeJong	Daylan Vavrek	Stephanie Malekoff	Sexsmith CC, Sexsmith & Grande Prairie CC, Grande Prairie
British Columbia	Cody Tanaka	Sarah Wong	Joshua Miki	Amanda Wong	Richmond CC, Richmond & Royal City CC, New Westminster
Manitoba	Ryan Wiebe	Shaela Hayward	Ty Dilello	Jennifer Clark-Rouire	Fort Rouge CC, Winnipeg
New Brunswick	Charlie Sullivan	Leah Thompson	Josh Vaughan	Carol Webb	Thistle-St. Andrews CC, Saint John
Newfoundland and Labrador	Trent Skanes	Brooke Godsland	Scott Eaton	Sarah McNeil Lamswood	RE/MAX Centre, St. John's
Northern Ontario	Dylan Johnston	Samantha Morris	Chris Briand	Marcy Barry	Fort William CC, Thunder Bay
Northwest Territories	Jamie Koe	Sarah Koltun	David Aho	Kerry Galusha	Yellowknife CC, Yellowknife
Nova Scotia	Owen Purcell	Christina Black	Adam McEachren	Jenn Baxter	Halifax CC, Halifax
Nunavut	Peter Mackey	Geneva Chislett	Jeff Nadeau	Robyn Mackey	Iqaluit CC, Iqaluit
Ontario	Jayden King	Grace Cave	Daniel Del Conte	Jillian Uniacke	Tillsonburg CC, Tillsonburg
Prince Edward Island	Tyler Smith	Jenny White	Ed White	Lauren MacFadyen	Crapaud Community CC, Crapaud
Quebec	Don Bowser	Brenda Nicholls	Dan deWaard	Pamela Nugent	Curling des Collines, Chelsea, CC Etchemin, Saint-Romuald, CC Victoria, Sainte-Foy, Buckingham CC, Buckingham, Glenmore CC, Dollard-des-Ormeaux
Saskatchewan	Jason Ackerman	Amber Holland	Sam Wills	Colleen Ackerman	Highland CC, Regina
Yukon	Robert Smallwood	Jody Smallwood	Scott Odian	Shannon Hall	Atlin CC, Atlin, British Columbia (Note: While Atlin CC is located in BC, it is officially recognized as a curling club within the Yukon Curling Association.)

== Round robin standings ==
Final Round Robin Standings

Key
Teams to Championship Pool

Pool A	Skip	W	L	W-L	LSD
Saskatchewan	Jason Ackerman	6	0	–	344.1
Nova Scotia	Owen Purcell	5	1	–	213.6
Newfoundland and Labrador	Trent Skanes	3	3	1–0	317.8
British Columbia	Cody Tanaka	3	3	0–1	619.6
Northern Ontario	Dylan Johnston	2	4	1–0	364.9
Ontario	Jayden King	2	4	0–1	289.1
Yukon	Robert Smallwood	0	6	–	954.8

Pool B	Skip	W	L	W-L	LSD
Manitoba	Ryan Wiebe	5	1	–	381.4
Quebec	Don Bowser	4	2	1–0	350.2
Alberta	Kurt Balderston	4	2	0–1	331.9
Prince Edward Island	Tyler Smith	3	3	1–0	436.8
Northwest Territories	Jamie Koe	3	3	0–1	549.8
New Brunswick	Charlie Sullivan	2	4	–	256.2
Nunavut	Peter Mackey	0	6	–	1273.1

== Round robin results ==
All draws are listed in Eastern Time (UTC−04:00).

=== Draw 1 ===
Sunday, November 3, 12:30 pm

Sheet A	1	2	3	4	5	6	7	8	Final
Ontario (King) 🔨	2	0	0	0	1	2	0	0	5
Saskatchewan (Ackerman)	0	2	0	0	0	0	4	1	7

Sheet B	1	2	3	4	5	6	7	8	Final
Northern Ontario (Johnston)	0	0	1	0	0	0	X	X	1
Nova Scotia (Purcell) 🔨	3	2	0	2	1	3	X	X	11

Sheet C	1	2	3	4	5	6	7	8	Final
Northwest Territories (Koe)	0	1	0	2	0	1	0	0	4
Quebec (Bowser) 🔨	1	0	2	0	0	0	1	1	5

Sheet D	1	2	3	4	5	6	7	8	Final
Manitoba (Wiebe)	0	0	1	0	2	1	1	1	6
New Brunswick (Sullivan) 🔨	3	0	0	2	0	0	0	0	5

=== Draw 2 ===
Sunday, November 3, 5:30 pm

Sheet A	1	2	3	4	5	6	7	8	Final
British Columbia (Tanaka) 🔨	0	0	0	1	0	1	1	0	3
Nova Scotia (Purcell)	1	1	1	0	1	0	0	2	6

Sheet B	1	2	3	4	5	6	7	8	Final
Newfoundland and Labrador (Skanes) 🔨	3	5	0	0	4	2	X	X	14
Yukon (Smallwood)	0	0	3	1	0	0	X	X	4

Sheet C	1	2	3	4	5	6	7	8	Final
Alberta (Balderston)	0	3	0	4	0	1	0	2	10
Prince Edward Island (Smith) 🔨	1	0	2	0	3	0	1	0	7

Sheet D	1	2	3	4	5	6	7	8	Final
Nunavut (Mackey) 🔨	1	0	0	0	0	0	X	X	1
Quebec (Bowser)	0	2	1	1	2	2	X	X	8

=== Draw 3 ===
Monday, November 4, 10:00 am

Sheet B	1	2	3	4	5	6	7	8	Final
Manitoba (Wiebe) 🔨	0	1	0	1	0	2	0	0	4
Northwest Territories (Koe)	0	0	2	0	1	0	1	1	5

Sheet C	1	2	3	4	5	6	7	8	Final
Ontario (King) 🔨	0	2	2	0	0	0	1	0	5
Northern Ontario (Johnston)	0	0	0	2	1	2	0	1	6

=== Draw 4 ===
Monday, November 4, 2:00 pm

Sheet A	1	2	3	4	5	6	7	8	Final
Alberta (Balderston)	0	2	0	1	0	0	X	X	3
Quebec (Bowser) 🔨	3	0	1	0	1	3	X	X	8

Sheet B	1	2	3	4	5	6	7	8	Final
New Brunswick (Sullivan)	0	1	0	1	2	1	0	3	8
Prince Edward Island (Smith) 🔨	2	0	1	0	0	0	2	0	5

Sheet C	1	2	3	4	5	6	7	8	Final
Saskatchewan (Ackerman) 🔨	0	1	0	2	1	1	0	1	6
Yukon (Smallwood)	2	0	2	0	0	0	1	0	5

Sheet D	1	2	3	4	5	6	7	8	Final
Newfoundland and Labrador (Skanes)	0	0	1	1	0	2	0	0	4
Nova Scotia (Purcell) 🔨	0	1	0	0	2	0	1	1	5

=== Draw 5 ===
Monday, November 4, 6:00 pm

Sheet A	1	2	3	4	5	6	7	8	Final
Northwest Territories (Koe)	2	0	2	0	0	3	0	X	7
New Brunswick (Sullivan) 🔨	0	1	0	1	0	0	1	X	3

Sheet B	1	2	3	4	5	6	7	8	Final
British Columbia (Tanaka)	2	0	0	1	2	2	0	X	7
Ontario (King) 🔨	0	0	1	0	0	0	1	X	2

Sheet C	1	2	3	4	5	6	7	8	Final
Nunavut (Mackey)	0	0	0	0	1	0	X	X	1
Manitoba (Wiebe) 🔨	1	1	0	4	0	3	X	X	9

Sheet D	1	2	3	4	5	6	7	8	Final
Northern Ontario (Johnston) 🔨	0	0	0	1	0	1	0	X	2
Saskatchewan (Ackerman)	0	0	1	0	2	0	2	X	5

=== Draw 6 ===
Tuesday, November 5, 10:00 am

Sheet A	1	2	3	4	5	6	7	8	Final
Prince Edward Island (Smith) 🔨	0	0	0	2	0	2	0	X	4
Manitoba (Wiebe)	3	1	0	0	2	0	3	X	9

Sheet B	1	2	3	4	5	6	7	8	Final
Nunavut (Mackey)	0	0	0	0	1	0	1	X	2
Alberta (Balderston) 🔨	1	1	1	1	0	2	0	X	6

Sheet C	1	2	3	4	5	6	7	8	Final
British Columbia (Tanaka)	0	0	0	1	0	0	X	X	1
Newfoundland and Labrador (Skanes) 🔨	1	1	1	0	3	2	X	X	8

Sheet D	1	2	3	4	5	6	7	8	Final
Yukon (Smallwood)	0	0	0	2	0	1	1	0	4
Ontario (King) 🔨	2	1	2	0	1	0	0	2	8

=== Draw 7 ===
Tuesday, November 5, 2:00 pm

Sheet A	1	2	3	4	5	6	7	8	9	Final
Newfoundland and Labrador (Skanes)	0	2	0	2	0	0	3	0	2	9
Northern Ontario (Johnston) 🔨	1	0	3	0	1	1	0	1	0	7

Sheet B	1	2	3	4	5	6	7	8	Final
Nova Scotia (Purcell)	0	2	0	0	0	0	1	0	3
Saskatchewan (Ackerman) 🔨	1	0	0	1	0	1	0	3	6

Sheet C	1	2	3	4	5	6	7	8	Final
Quebec (Bowser)	1	0	0	4	0	3	0	X	8
New Brunswick (Sullivan) 🔨	0	1	0	0	1	0	1	X	3

Sheet D	1	2	3	4	5	6	7	8	Final
Alberta (Balderston) 🔨	5	0	0	2	0	3	X	X	10
Northwest Territories (Koe)	0	1	1	0	1	0	X	X	3

=== Draw 8 ===
Tuesday, November 5, 6:00 pm

Sheet A	1	2	3	4	5	6	7	8	Final
Yukon (Smallwood)	0	5	0	0	1	0	1	X	7
British Columbia (Tanaka) 🔨	1	0	2	4	0	3	0	X	10

Sheet B	1	2	3	4	5	6	7	8	Final
Quebec (Bowser)	1	0	0	1	0	0	2	0	4
Manitoba (Wiebe) 🔨	0	2	0	0	1	1	0	1	5

Sheet C	1	2	3	4	5	6	7	8	Final
Nova Scotia (Purcell) 🔨	1	0	1	1	0	4	0	X	7
Ontario (King)	0	1	0	0	1	0	1	X	3

Sheet D	1	2	3	4	5	6	7	8	Final
Prince Edward Island (Smith)	4	3	1	0	2	0	X	X	10
Nunavut (Mackey) 🔨	0	0	0	1	0	1	X	X	2

=== Draw 9 ===
Wednesday, November 6, 10:00 am

Sheet A	1	2	3	4	5	6	7	8	Final
New Brunswick (Sullivan) 🔨	4	0	0	1	2	3	X	X	10
Nunavut (Mackey)	0	1	0	0	0	0	X	X	1

Sheet B	1	2	3	4	5	6	7	8	Final
Yukon (Smallwood) 🔨	1	0	0	1	0	2	1	1	6
Northern Ontario (Johnston)	0	2	3	0	2	0	0	0	7

Sheet C	1	2	3	4	5	6	7	8	Final
Prince Edward Island (Smith)	1	0	2	0	2	2	0	1	8
Northwest Territories (Koe) 🔨	0	1	0	2	0	0	4	0	7

Sheet D	1	2	3	4	5	6	7	8	Final
Saskatchewan (Ackerman) 🔨	1	0	1	3	0	1	0	1	7
British Columbia (Tanaka)	0	3	0	0	1	0	0	0	4

=== Draw 10 ===
Wednesday, November 6, 2:00 pm

Sheet A	1	2	3	4	5	6	7	8	Final
Quebec (Bowser) 🔨	2	0	1	0	2	0	1	0	6
Prince Edward Island (Smith)	0	1	0	3	0	1	0	2	7

Sheet B	1	2	3	4	5	6	7	8	Final
Ontario (King) 🔨	0	2	0	0	2	0	1	2	7
Newfoundland and Labrador (Skanes)	0	0	1	1	0	0	0	0	2

Sheet C	1	2	3	4	5	6	7	8	Final
Manitoba (Wiebe)	0	0	0	0	2	0	3	1	6
Alberta (Balderston) 🔨	0	1	1	2	0	1	0	0	5

Sheet D	1	2	3	4	5	6	7	8	Final
Nova Scotia (Purcell) 🔨	3	1	0	2	1	0	3	X	10
Yukon (Smallwood)	0	0	2	0	0	2	0	X	4

=== Draw 11 ===
Wednesday, November 6, 6:00 pm

Sheet A	1	2	3	4	5	6	7	8	Final
Saskatchewan (Ackerman)	0	0	1	0	2	0	3	1	7
Newfoundland and Labrador (Skanes) 🔨	2	0	0	1	0	1	0	0	4

Sheet B	1	2	3	4	5	6	7	8	Final
Northwest Territories (Koe) 🔨	3	1	1	1	1	0	0	X	7
Nunavut (Mackey)	0	0	0	0	0	1	2	X	3

Sheet C	1	2	3	4	5	6	7	8	9	Final
Northern Ontario (Johnston) 🔨	0	0	0	1	0	0	0	1	0	2
British Columbia (Tanaka)	1	0	0	0	0	0	1	0	2	4

Sheet D	1	2	3	4	5	6	7	8	Final
New Brunswick (Sullivan) 🔨	0	1	0	1	0	0	0	X	2
Alberta (Balderston)	2	0	2	0	0	1	4	X	9

== Seeding pool ==
=== Standings ===
Final Seeding Pool Standings

Team	Skip	W	L	W-L	LSD
Northern Ontario	Dylan Johnston	5	4	1–0	529.2
Northwest Territories	Jamie Koe	5	4	0–1	740.4
New Brunswick	Charlie Sullivan	4	5	–	446.5
Ontario	Jayden King	3	6	–	498.2
Nunavut	Peter Mackey	1	8	–	1982.3
Yukon	Robert Smallwood	0	9	–	1358.1

=== Results ===
==== Draw 12 ====
Thursday, November 7, 9:00 am

Sheet A	1	2	3	4	5	6	7	8	Final
Yukon (Smallwood)	0	1	0	0	0	1	0	X	2
Northwest Territories (Koe) 🔨	2	0	1	1	1	0	2	X	7

Sheet B	1	2	3	4	5	6	7	8	Final
Ontario (King)	0	1	0	0	1	0	X	X	2
New Brunswick (Sullivan) 🔨	1	0	4	2	0	2	X	X	9

Sheet C	1	2	3	4	5	6	7	8	Final
Nunavut (Mackey) 🔨	1	0	0	0	0	1	0	X	2
Northern Ontario (Johnston)	0	4	1	3	0	0	2	X	10

==== Draw 14 ====
Thursday, November 7, 4:00 pm

Sheet B	1	2	3	4	5	6	7	8	Final
Northern Ontario (Johnston) 🔨	4	2	0	0	0	3	0	1	10
Northwest Territories (Koe)	0	0	2	2	1	0	1	0	6

Sheet C	1	2	3	4	5	6	7	8	Final
Yukon (Smallwood)	0	0	0	0	3	1	0	X	4
New Brunswick (Sullivan) 🔨	1	1	2	3	0	0	2	X	9

Sheet D	1	2	3	4	5	6	7	8	Final
Nunavut (Mackey)	0	0	0	2	0	0	1	X	3
Ontario (King) 🔨	3	1	1	0	2	1	0	X	8

==== Draw 17 ====
Friday, November 8, 2:00 pm

Sheet A	1	2	3	4	5	6	7	8	Final
New Brunswick (Sullivan) 🔨	1	1	0	0	2	0	0	0	4
Northern Ontario (Johnston)	0	0	2	1	0	3	0	1	7

Sheet B	1	2	3	4	5	6	7	8	Final
Yukon (Smallwood) 🔨	0	5	0	1	0	0	0	0	6
Nunavut (Mackey)	0	0	3	0	0	1	1	4	9

Sheet C	1	2	3	4	5	6	7	8	Final
Northwest Territories (Koe)	0	0	1	0	1	0	3	1	6
Ontario (King) 🔨	0	2	0	1	0	1	0	0	4

== Championship pool ==
=== Standings ===
Final Championship Pool Standings

Key
Teams to Playoffs

Team	Skip	W	L	W-L	LSD
Saskatchewan	Jason Ackerman	9	1	1–0	773.9
Nova Scotia	Owen Purcell	9	1	0–1	358.6
Manitoba	Ryan Wiebe	7	3	1–0	892.9
Alberta	Kurt Balderston	7	3	0–1	478.8
British Columbia	Cody Tanaka	5	5	1–0	752.4
Quebec	Don Bowser	5	5	0–1	499.7
Prince Edward Island	Tyler Smith	4	6	–	639.1
Newfoundland and Labrador	Trent Skanes	3	7	–	683.8

=== Results ===
==== Draw 13 ====
Thursday, November 7, 12:30 pm

Sheet A	1	2	3	4	5	6	7	8	Final
Prince Edward Island (Smith) 🔨	2	0	1	0	1	0	1	0	6
Saskatchewan (Ackerman)	0	2	0	2	0	2	0	2	8

Sheet B	1	2	3	4	5	6	7	8	Final
Nova Scotia (Purcell) 🔨	1	1	0	0	0	3	0	2	7
Alberta (Balderston)	0	0	2	1	0	0	1	0	4

Sheet C	1	2	3	4	5	6	7	8	Final
Manitoba (Wiebe)	0	0	0	2	0	0	0	2	4
British Columbia (Tanaka) 🔨	0	1	0	0	1	0	1	0	3

Sheet D	1	2	3	4	5	6	7	8	Final
Newfoundland and Labrador (Skanes)	0	0	0	0	0	1	0	X	1
Quebec (Bowser) 🔨	2	1	0	1	3	0	0	X	7

==== Draw 15 ====
Thursday, November 7, 7:30 pm

Sheet A	1	2	3	4	5	6	7	8	Final
British Columbia (Tanaka)	0	2	0	2	0	2	0	X	6
Quebec (Bowser) 🔨	0	0	1	0	1	0	1	X	3

Sheet B	1	2	3	4	5	6	7	8	Final
Manitoba (Wiebe)	0	0	2	1	0	2	0	3	8
Newfoundland and Labrador (Skanes) 🔨	1	2	0	0	1	0	2	0	6

Sheet C	1	2	3	4	5	6	7	8	Final
Saskatchewan (Ackerman)	1	0	0	0	1	0	1	0	3
Alberta (Balderston) 🔨	0	1	0	3	0	1	0	2	7

Sheet D	1	2	3	4	5	6	7	8	Final
Prince Edward Island (Smith) 🔨	0	2	0	0	0	1	0	X	3
Nova Scotia (Purcell)	1	0	2	2	1	0	5	X	11

==== Draw 16 ====
Friday, November 8, 10:00 am

Sheet A	1	2	3	4	5	6	7	8	Final
Nova Scotia (Purcell) 🔨	3	1	0	3	0	2	X	X	9
Manitoba (Wiebe)	0	0	1	0	1	0	X	X	2

Sheet B	1	2	3	4	5	6	7	8	Final
Quebec (Bowser) 🔨	0	0	0	0	0	1	X	X	1
Saskatchewan (Ackerman)	1	2	1	3	1	0	X	X	8

Sheet C	1	2	3	4	5	6	7	8	Final
Newfoundland and Labrador (Skanes)	1	2	0	0	2	0	2	0	7
Prince Edward Island (Smith) 🔨	0	0	2	2	0	2	0	2	8

Sheet D	1	2	3	4	5	6	7	8	Final
Alberta (Balderston)	0	1	1	2	0	1	3	X	8
British Columbia (Tanaka) 🔨	0	0	0	0	2	0	0	X	2

==== Draw 18 ====
Friday, November 8, 6:00 pm

Sheet A	1	2	3	4	5	6	7	8	Final
Alberta (Balderston) 🔨	3	1	0	1	0	0	0	1	6
Newfoundland and Labrador (Skanes)	0	0	1	0	1	1	1	0	4

Sheet B	1	2	3	4	5	6	7	8	Final
British Columbia (Tanaka) 🔨	1	0	1	0	3	0	2	2	9
Prince Edward Island (Smith)	0	2	0	1	0	2	0	0	5

Sheet C	1	2	3	4	5	6	7	8	Final
Quebec (Bowser)	0	1	0	0	1	0	X	X	2
Nova Scotia (Purcell) 🔨	1	0	2	4	0	2	X	X	9

Sheet D	1	2	3	4	5	6	7	8	Final
Saskatchewan (Ackerman)	0	0	0	2	0	2	0	2	6
Manitoba (Wiebe) 🔨	1	0	2	0	1	0	1	0	5

== Playoffs ==
Semifinals
1	Saskatchewan	7
4	Alberta	1
2	Nova Scotia	7
3	Manitoba	4

Final
1	Saskatchewan	4
2	Nova Scotia	5
Third place
4	Alberta	9
3	Manitoba	4

=== Semifinals ===
Saturday, November 9, 10:00 am

Sheet B	1	2	3	4	5	6	7	8	Final
Saskatchewan (Ackerman) 🔨	0	2	1	1	0	3	0	X	7
Alberta (Balderston)	0	0	0	0	1	0	0	X	1

Sheet C	1	2	3	4	5	6	7	8	Final
Nova Scotia (Purcell) 🔨	2	1	0	3	0	1	0	X	7
Manitoba (Wiebe)	0	0	1	0	2	0	1	X	4

=== Bronze medal game ===
Saturday, November 9, 2:30 pm

Sheet C	1	2	3	4	5	6	7	8	Final
Alberta (Balderston)	2	1	0	3	0	1	2	X	9
Manitoba (Wiebe) 🔨	0	0	2	0	2	0	0	X	4

=== Final ===
Saturday, November 9, 2:30 pm

Sheet B	1	2	3	4	5	6	7	8	Final
Saskatchewan (Ackerman) 🔨	0	1	0	0	2	0	1	0	4
Nova Scotia (Purcell)	1	0	1	1	0	1	0	1	5

== Final standings ==
Place	Team
1st place, gold medalist(s)	Nova Scotia
2nd place, silver medalist(s)	Saskatchewan
3rd place, bronze medalist(s)	Alberta
4	Manitoba
5	British Columbia
6	Quebec
7	Prince Edward Island
8	Newfoundland and Labrador

Place	Team
9	Northern Ontario
10	Northwest Territories
11	New Brunswick
12	Ontario
13	Nunavut
14	Yukon
