= 2012 Canadian Mixed Curling Championship =

- Host city: Sudbury, Ontario
- Arena: Sudbury Curling Club
- Dates: November 12–19, 2011
- Winner: Saskatchewan
- Curling club: Tartan CC, Regina
- Skip: Jason Ackerman
- Third: Chantelle Eberle
- Second: Dean Hicke
- Lead: Colleen Ackerman
- Finalist: Alberta (Kurt Balderston)

The 2012 Canadian Mixed Curling Championship was held from November 12 to 19, 2011, at the Sudbury Curling Club in Sudbury, Ontario.

== Teams ==
The teams are as follows:

Team	Skip	Third	Second	Lead	Locale
Alberta	Kurt Balderston	Desirée Owen	Del Shaughnessy	Stephanie Malekoff	Sexsmith CC, Sexsmith
British Columbia	Doug Marshall	Lisa Deputan	Darren Jarvis	Janet Nicholles	Chilliwack CC, Chilliwack
Manitoba	Sean Grassie	Tracey Lavery	Scott McCamis	Calleen Neufeld	Deer Lodge CC, Winnipeg
New Brunswick	Sylvie Robichaud	Marcel Robichaud	Marie Richard	Andre Boudreau	Beausejour CC, Moncton
Newfoundland and Labrador	Gary Alcock	Susan Curtis	Brian Bailey	Ashley Rumboldt	Caribou CC, Stephenville
Northern Ontario	Mike Assad	Alissa Begin	Andrew Nerpin	Jann Constante	Fort William CC, Thunder Bay
Northwest Territories	Steve Moss	Kalie Dobson	Robert Borden	Debbie Moss	Yellowknife CC, Yellowknife
Nova Scotia	Chris Sutherland	Kelly MacIntosh	Glen MacLeod	Jen Crouse	Mayflower CC, Halifax
Nunavut	Ed Sattelberger	Kristy Hewitt	Dennis Masson	Kim Masson	Iqaluit CC, Iqaluit
Ontario	Mark Homan	Rachel Homan	Brian Fleischhaker	Alison Kreviazuk	Rideau CC, Ottawa
Prince Edward Island	Brett Gallant	Erin Carmody	Anson Carmody	Michelle Mackie	Charlottetown CC, Charlottetown
Quebec	Martin Ferland	Virginie Lassard	Frédéric Marchand	Anik Brascoup	CC Laviolette, Trois-Rivières
Saskatchewan	Jason Ackerman	Chantelle Eberle	Dean Hicke	Colleen Ackerman	Tartan CC, Regina
Yukon	Scott Hamilton	Darlene Hutton	Herb Balsam	Corinne Delaire	Whitehorse CC, Whitehorse

== Round-robin standings ==
Final round-robin standings

Key
Teams to Playoffs
Relegated to 2013 qualifying round

Team	Skip	W	L
Alberta	Kurt Balderston	11	2
Saskatchewan	Jason Ackerman	9	4
New Brunswick	Sylvie Robichaud	9	4
British Columbia	Doug Marshall	8	5
Prince Edward Island	Brett Gallant	8	5
Ontario	Mark Homan	8	5
Manitoba	Sean Grassie	8	5
Quebec	Martin Ferland	8	5
Northern Ontario	Mike Assad	7	6
Northwest Territories	Steve Moss	6	7
Newfoundland and Labrador	Gary Alcock	4	9
Nova Scotia	Chris Sutherland	4	9
Nunavut	Ed Sattelberger	1	12
Yukon	Scott Hamilton	0	13

== Round-robin results ==
All draw times are listed in Eastern Standard Time (UTC-05).

=== Draw 1 ===
Saturday, November 12, 10:00

Sheet A	1	2	3	4	5	6	7	8	9	10	Final
Northern Ontario (Assad)	3	2	0	2	1	0	5	X	X	X	14
Nunavut (Sattelberger)	0	0	1	0	0	2	0	X	X	X	3

Sheet B	1	2	3	4	5	6	7	8	9	10	Final
Quebec (Ferland)	2	0	0	0	0	2	3	2	X	X	9
Yukon (Hamilton)	0	0	1	1	1	0	0	0	X	X	3

Sheet C	1	2	3	4	5	6	7	8	9	10	Final
Manitoba (Grassie)	1	0	2	0	1	0	1	0	1	0	6
Prince Edward Island (Gallant)	0	1	0	2	0	2	0	2	0	1	8

Sheet D	1	2	3	4	5	6	7	8	9	10	Final
British Columbia (Marshall)	0	1	0	1	0	0	1	0	0	X	3
New Brunswick (Robichaud)	1	0	2	0	2	0	0	1	1	X	7

Sheet E	1	2	3	4	5	6	7	8	9	10	Final
Northwest Territories (Moss)	0	1	0	2	0	1	0	1	1	0	6
Ontario (Homan)	4	0	1	0	1	0	2	0	0	1	9

=== Draw 2 ===
Saturday, November 12, 14:30

Sheet A	1	2	3	4	5	6	7	8	9	10	Final
Saskatchewan (Ackerman)	0	2	0	1	2	0	1	0	1	X	7
Newfoundland and Labrador (Alcock)	1	0	0	0	0	1	0	3	0	X	5

Sheet B	1	2	3	4	5	6	7	8	9	10	Final
Ontario (Homan)	0	1	0	0	3	0	1	2	X	X	7
Prince Edward Island (Gallant)	0	0	1	0	0	1	0	0	X	X	2

Sheet C	1	2	3	4	5	6	7	8	9	10	Final
New Brunswick (Robichaud)	0	1	0	1	1	0	0	1	0	2	6
Northwest Territories (Moss)	1	0	1	0	0	1	0	0	1	0	4

Sheet D	1	2	3	4	5	6	7	8	9	10	Final
Nunavut (Sattelberger)	0	0	2	0	1	0	2	1	0	X	6
Quebec (Ferland)	2	1	0	5	0	2	0	0	2	X	12

Sheet E	1	2	3	4	5	6	7	8	9	10	Final
Nova Scotia (Sutherland)	1	0	0	0	0	0	2	X	X	X	3
Alberta (Balderston)	0	2	1	4	3	0	0	X	X	X	10

=== Draw 3 ===
Saturday, November 12, 19:00

Sheet A	1	2	3	4	5	6	7	8	9	10	Final
Alberta (Balderston)	1	0	0	1	0	1	0	0	0	X	3
Prince Edward Island (Gallant)	0	1	1	0	1	0	2	1	1	X	7

Sheet B	1	2	3	4	5	6	7	8	9	10	Final
British Columbia (Marshall)	0	1	0	1	0	0	0	X	X	X	2
Northern Ontario (Assad)	2	0	3	0	1	1	3	X	X	X	10

Sheet C	1	2	3	4	5	6	7	8	9	10	Final
Nova Scotia (Sutherland)	0	0	1	0	0	1	0	X	X	X	2
Saskatchewan (Ackerman)	1	1	0	1	4	0	2	X	X	X	9

Sheet D	1	2	3	4	5	6	7	8	9	10	Final
Manitoba (Grassie)	0	1	2	1	1	0	2	2	X	X	9
Newfoundland and Labrador (Alcock)	2	0	0	0	0	1	0	0	X	X	3

Sheet E	1	2	3	4	5	6	7	8	9	10	Final
Yukon (Hamilton)	0	1	1	0	1	0	0	X	X	X	3
New Brunswick (Robichaud)	3	0	0	1	0	5	2	X	X	X	11

=== Draw 4 ===
Sunday, November 13, 10:00

Sheet A	1	2	3	4	5	6	7	8	9	10	Final
Manitoba (Grassie)	0	1	1	0	0	0	2	1	0	4	9
Quebec (Ferland)	2	0	0	1	2	1	0	0	2	0	8

Sheet B	1	2	3	4	5	6	7	8	9	10	Final
Alberta (Balderston)	1	2	2	0	0	0	0	1	0	0	6
Newfoundland and Labrador (Alcock)	0	0	0	1	0	0	1	0	2	1	5

Sheet C	1	2	3	4	5	6	7	8	9	10	Final
Nunavut (Sattelberger)	0	0	0	0	0	1	0	2	0	X	3
Ontario (Homan)	2	2	1	1	0	0	2	0	1	X	9

Sheet D	1	2	3	4	5	6	7	8	9	10	Final
Nova Scotia (Sutherland)	0	1	0	4	0	1	1	1	0	X	8
Northwest Territories (Moss)	1	0	1	0	2	0	0	0	1	X	5

Sheet E	1	2	3	4	5	6	7	8	9	10	11	Final
Northern Ontario (Assad)	1	0	0	1	0	0	2	0	0	0	0	4
Saskatchewan (Ackerman)	0	0	0	0	1	0	0	0	2	1	1	5

=== Draw 5 ===
Sunday, November 13, 14:30

Sheet A	1	2	3	4	5	6	7	8	9	10	11	Final
Ontario (Homan)	1	1	0	0	1	0	0	2	0	2	0	7
New Brunswick (Robichaud)	0	0	2	1	0	1	1	0	2	0	2	9

Sheet B	1	2	3	4	5	6	7	8	9	10	Final
Nova Scotia (Sutherland)	0	1	1	1	0	2	0	0	1	0	6
Manitoba (Grassie)	1	0	0	0	1	0	1	3	0	1	7

Sheet C	1	2	3	4	5	6	7	8	9	10	Final
Yukon (Hamilton)	0	0	2	0	0	0	2	X	X	X	4
British Columbia (Marshall)	3	3	0	5	1	1	0	X	X	X	13

Sheet D	1	2	3	4	5	6	7	8	9	10	Final
Prince Edward Island (Gallant)	1	0	1	3	0	2	0	2	0	X	9
Northern Ontario (Assad)	0	2	0	0	1	0	2	0	2	X	7

Sheet E	1	2	3	4	5	6	7	8	9	10	Final
Quebec (Ferland)	3	3	0	0	0	4	3	X	X	X	13
Newfoundland and Labrador (Alcock)	0	0	2	0	1	0	0	X	X	X	3

=== Draw 6 ===
Sunday, November 13, 19:00

Sheet A	1	2	3	4	5	6	7	8	9	10	Final
Northwest Territories (Moss)	0	2	0	2	3	0	2	0	X	X	9
Yukon (Hamilton)	1	0	1	0	0	1	0	1	X	X	4

Sheet B	1	2	3	4	5	6	7	8	9	10	Final
Nunavut (Sattelberger)	0	0	0	1	0	1	0	X	X	X	3
New Brunswick (Robichaud)	2	1	1	0	3	0	3	X	X	X	10

Sheet C	1	2	3	4	5	6	7	8	9	10	Final
Quebec (Ferland)	0	1	0	3	0	0	1	0	2	0	7
Alberta (Balderston)	3	0	1	0	2	1	0	1	0	2	10

Sheet D	1	2	3	4	5	6	7	8	9	10	Final
Saskatchewan (Ackerman)	0	0	2	2	0	2	0	1	0	0	7
Ontario (Homan)	1	0	0	0	3	0	1	0	1	0	6

Sheet E	1	2	3	4	5	6	7	8	9	10	Final
British Columbia (Marshall)	0	1	0	0	0	1	3	1	1	X	7
Prince Edward Island (Gallant)	1	0	1	1	0	0	0	0	0	X	3

=== Draw 7 ===
Monday, November 14, 10:00

Sheet A	1	2	3	4	5	6	7	8	9	10	11	Final
Nova Scotia (Sutherland)	0	2	0	0	0	2	1	0	0	1	0	6
British Columbia (Marshall)	1	0	2	1	1	0	0	1	0	0	2	8

Sheet B	1	2	3	4	5	6	7	8	9	10	Final
Prince Edward Island (Gallant)	0	2	0	0	1	0	1	0	1	2	7
Saskatchewan (Ackerman)	0	0	1	1	0	1	0	1	0	0	4

Sheet C	1	2	3	4	5	6	7	8	9	10	Final
Northern Ontario (Assad)	0	2	0	1	0	2	0	3	1	X	9
Newfoundland and Labrador (Alcock)	2	0	1	0	2	0	1	0	0	X	6

Sheet D	1	2	3	4	5	6	7	8	9	10	Final
Yukon (Hamilton)	0	0	0	0	0	2	0	X	X	X	2
Alberta (Balderston)	3	2	4	5	0	0	3	X	X	X	17

Sheet E	1	2	3	4	5	6	7	8	9	10	Final
New Brunswick (Robichaud)	0	2	0	0	2	0	0	1	0	X	5
Manitoba (Grassie)	2	0	1	1	0	2	3	0	2	X	11

=== Draw 8 ===
Monday, November 14, 14:30

Sheet A	1	2	3	4	5	6	7	8	9	10	Final
Quebec (Ferland)	0	2	0	1	0	1	0	0	1	1	6
Northern Ontario (Assad)	1	0	1	0	2	0	1	0	0	0	5

Sheet B	1	2	3	4	5	6	7	8	9	10	Final
Northwest Territories (Moss)	1	0	0	0	0	0	1	0	X	X	2
Alberta (Balderston)	0	2	0	0	1	1	0	3	X	X	7

Sheet C	1	2	3	4	5	6	7	8	9	10	Final
Ontario (Homan)	0	1	0	1	0	1	0	1	0	X	4
Manitoba (Grassie)	0	0	1	0	2	0	2	0	4	X	9

Sheet D	1	2	3	4	5	6	7	8	9	10	Final
New Brunswick (Robichaud)	0	0	2	1	0	0	3	4	X	X	10
Prince Edward Island (Gallant)	1	0	0	0	2	0	0	0	X	X	3

Sheet E	1	2	3	4	5	6	7	8	9	10	Final
Saskatchewan (Ackerman)	1	0	2	1	1	0	0	1	1	X	7
Nunavut (Sattelberger)	0	1	0	0	0	1	1	0	0	X	3

=== Draw 9 ===
Monday, November 14, 19:00

Sheet A	1	2	3	4	5	6	7	8	9	10	Final
Newfoundland and Labrador (Alcock)	1	0	0	1	0	1	0	1	0	X	4
Ontario (Homan)	0	1	3	0	1	0	0	0	3	X	8

Sheet B	1	2	3	4	5	6	7	8	9	10	11	Final
Manitoba (Grassie)	1	1	1	1	0	0	0	1	0	1	0	6
British Columbia (Marshall)	0	0	0	0	2	1	1	0	2	0	1	7

Sheet C	1	2	3	4	5	6	7	8	9	10	Final
Northwest Territories (Moss)	5	0	1	1	1	0	2	0	X	X	10
Nunavut (Sattelberger)	0	1	0	0	0	1	0	2	X	X	4

Sheet D	1	2	3	4	5	6	7	8	9	10	Final
Quebec (Ferland)	1	1	0	2	2	4	0	1	X	X	11
Nova Scotia (Sutherland)	0	0	1	0	0	0	3	0	X	X	4

Sheet E	1	2	3	4	5	6	7	8	9	10	11	Final
Yukon (Hamilton)	0	1	0	1	2	2	0	0	0	2	0	8
Northern Ontario (Assad)	2	0	3	0	0	0	0	1	2	0	2	10

=== Draw 10 ===
Tuesday, November 15, 10:00

Sheet A	1	2	3	4	5	6	7	8	9	10	Final
Yukon (Hamilton)	0	2	0	1	0	2	0	0	0	X	5
Saskatchewan (Ackerman)	1	0	1	0	1	0	2	3	1	X	9

Sheet B	1	2	3	4	5	6	7	8	9	10	Final
Ontario (Homan)	1	0	3	0	0	2	0	3	X	X	9
Quebec (Ferland)	0	1	0	1	0	0	1	0	X	X	3

Sheet C	1	2	3	4	5	6	7	8	9	10	Final
Alberta (Balderston)	0	4	0	0	0	0	3	0	2	X	9
New Brunswick (Robichaud)	1	0	3	0	0	0	0	1	0	X	5

Sheet D	1	2	3	4	5	6	7	8	9	10	Final
British Columbia (Marshall)	4	1	0	3	2	0	1	0	X	X	11
Nunavut (Sattelberger)	0	0	1	0	0	0	0	1	X	X	2

Sheet E	1	2	3	4	5	6	7	8	9	10	11	Final
Prince Edward Island (Gallant)	1	0	2	0	2	0	1	0	0	1	0	7
Northwest Territories (Moss)	0	1	0	3	0	1	0	0	2	0	1	8

=== Draw 11 ===
Tuesday, November 15, 14:30

Sheet A	1	2	3	4	5	6	7	8	9	10	Final
Manitoba (Grassie)	0	0	0	0	3	1	0	1	0	1	6
Alberta (Balderston)	0	0	2	1	0	0	2	0	2	0	7

Sheet B	1	2	3	4	5	6	7	8	9	10	Final
Northern Ontario (Assad)	0	0	3	0	0	1	0	2	1	1	8
Nova Scotia (Sutherland)	1	2	0	1	1	0	1	0	0	0	6

Sheet C	1	2	3	4	5	6	7	8	9	10	Final
Saskatchewan (Ackerman)	1	0	1	0	0	0	1	X	X	X	3
Quebec (Ferland)	0	2	0	0	3	4	0	X	X	X	9

Sheet D	1	2	3	4	5	6	7	8	9	10	Final
Ontario (Homan)	0	4	0	0	2	0	0	2	X	X	8
Yukon (Hamilton)	0	0	1	0	0	1	0	0	X	X	2

Sheet E	1	2	3	4	5	6	7	8	9	10	Final
Newfoundland and Labrador (Alcock)	3	0	0	1	0	0	0	1	0	1	6
British Columbia (Marshall)	0	0	0	0	1	1	0	0	1	0	3

=== Draw 12 ===
Tuesday, November 15, 19:00

Sheet A	1	2	3	4	5	6	7	8	9	10	Final
Northern Ontario (Assad)	0	2	0	2	0	0	1	1	0	X	6
Northwest Territories (Moss)	2	0	1	0	1	1	0	0	4	X	9

Sheet B	1	2	3	4	5	6	7	8	9	10	Final
New Brunswick (Robichaud)	1	1	0	2	0	2	0	0	1	X	7
Newfoundland and Labrador (Alcock)	0	0	1	0	2	0	0	1	0	X	4

Sheet C	1	2	3	4	5	6	7	8	9	10	Final
Prince Edward Island (Gallant)	0	2	0	0	1	0	0	X	X	X	3
Nova Scotia (Sutherland)	1	0	2	3	0	2	1	X	X	X	9

Sheet D	1	2	3	4	5	6	7	8	9	10	Final
Saskatchewan (Ackerman)	0	3	0	2	0	1	0	1	0	0	7
Manitoba (Grassie)	1	0	2	0	1	0	1	0	2	1	8

Sheet E	1	2	3	4	5	6	7	8	9	10	Final
Nunavut (Sattelberger)	0	0	1	0	0	1	0	2	0	X	4
Alberta (Balderston)	5	0	0	0	0	0	2	0	4	X	11

=== Draw 13 ===
Wednesday, November 16, 10:00

Sheet A	1	2	3	4	5	6	7	8	9	10	Final
British Columbia (Marshall)	1	0	0	1	0	0	0	X	X	X	2
Quebec (Ferland)	0	3	1	0	2	2	3	X	X	X	11

Sheet B	1	2	3	4	5	6	7	8	9	10	Final
Yukon (Hamilton)	0	0	2	0	2	0	0	0	1	0	5
Nunavut (Sattelberger)	2	1	0	1	0	0	1	1	0	3	9

Sheet C	1	2	3	4	5	6	7	8	9	10	Final
Manitoba (Grassie)	0	0	1	0	2	0	1	0	2	X	6
Northern Ontario (Assad)	1	0	0	2	0	2	0	4	0	X	9

Sheet D	1	2	3	4	5	6	7	8	9	10	Final
Newfoundland and Labrador (Alcock)	1	1	0	1	0	2	1	0	0	0	6
Northwest Territories (Moss)	0	0	2	0	1	0	0	3	1	1	8

Sheet E	1	2	3	4	5	6	7	8	9	10	Final
Ontario (Homan)	0	1	1	1	0	2	0	0	2	X	7
Nova Scotia (Sutherland)	1	0	0	0	1	0	0	1	0	X	3

=== Draw 14 ===
Wednesday, November 16, 14:30

Sheet A	1	2	3	4	5	6	7	8	9	10	Final
Nunavut (Sattelberger)	0	1	0	0	0	1	0	X	X	X	2
Prince Edward Island (Gallant)	2	0	4	0	1	0	2	X	X	X	9

Sheet B	1	2	3	4	5	6	7	8	9	10	Final
Saskatchewan (Ackerman)	1	4	1	2	0	1	0	1	X	X	10
Northwest Territories (Moss)	0	0	0	0	2	0	2	0	X	X	4

Sheet C	1	2	3	4	5	6	7	8	9	10	Final
British Columbia (Marshall)	1	0	1	0	0	0	0	1	X	X	3
Alberta (Balderston)	0	2	0	1	2	3	0	0	X	X	8

Sheet D	1	2	3	4	5	6	7	8	9	10	Final
Northern Ontario (Assad)	1	0	0	1	0	0	2	2	0	1	7
New Brunswick (Robichaud)	0	0	2	0	0	1	0	0	2	0	5

Sheet E	1	2	3	4	5	6	7	8	9	10	Final
Manitoba (Grassie)	1	1	1	0	0	2	0	3	0	X	8
Yukon (Hamilton)	0	0	0	0	1	0	3	0	1	X	5

=== Draw 15 ===
Wednesday, November 16, 19:00

Sheet A	1	2	3	4	5	6	7	8	9	10	Final
New Brunswick (Robichaud)	0	0	2	1	1	1	0	0	1	X	6
Nova Scotia (Sutherland)	0	1	0	0	0	0	2	0	0	X	3

Sheet B	1	2	3	4	5	6	7	8	9	10	Final
Alberta (Balderston)	0	0	0	3	0	1	1	0	0	3	8
Ontario (Homan)	0	1	0	0	2	0	0	1	1	0	5

Sheet C	1	2	3	4	5	6	7	8	9	10	Final
Newfoundland and Labrador (Alcock)	2	0	3	3	0	0	6	X	X	X	14
Yukon (Hamilton)	0	2	0	0	1	1	0	X	X	X	4

Sheet D	1	2	3	4	5	6	7	8	9	10	Final
Prince Edward Island (Gallant)	0	0	3	0	3	0	0	0	1	1	8
Quebec (Ferland)	1	0	0	2	0	1	0	1	0	0	5

Sheet E	1	2	3	4	5	6	7	8	9	10	Final
British Columbia (Marshall)	1	1	0	3	0	0	4	2	X	X	11
Saskatchewan (Ackerman)	0	0	2	0	1	1	0	0	X	X	4

=== Draw 16 ===
Thursday, November 17, 10:00

Sheet A	1	2	3	4	5	6	7	8	9	10	Final
Northwest Territories (Moss)	1	0	0	0	0	1	0	1	0	2	5
Manitoba (Grassie)	0	1	0	0	1	0	1	0	1	0	4

Sheet B	1	2	3	4	5	6	7	8	9	10	11	Final
Newfoundland and Labrador (Alcock)	0	1	0	2	0	1	1	0	0	2	0	7
Prince Edward Island (Gallant)	0	0	1	0	3	0	0	2	1	0	1	8

Sheet C	1	2	3	4	5	6	7	8	9	10	Final
New Brunswick (Robichaud)	0	0	0	1	0	1	0	0	X	X	2
Saskatchewan (Ackerman)	0	0	1	0	3	0	0	4	X	X	8

Sheet D	1	2	3	4	5	6	7	8	9	10	Final
Nunavut (Sattelberger)	0	0	1	0	2	1	0	0	1	X	5
Nova Scotia (Sutherland)	0	3	0	3	0	0	1	2	0	X	9

Sheet E	1	2	3	4	5	6	7	8	9	10	Final
Alberta (Balderston)	1	0	2	0	1	1	0	0	2	X	7
Northern Ontario (Assad)	0	1	0	1	0	0	0	2	0	X	4

=== Draw 17 ===
Thursday, November 17, 14:30

Sheet A	1	2	3	4	5	6	7	8	9	10	Final
Ontario (Homan)	1	0	2	0	1	0	0	X	X	X	4
British Columbia (Marshall)	0	4	0	1	0	4	3	X	X	X	12

Sheet C	1	2	3	4	5	6	7	8	9	10	Final
Quebec (Ferland)	0	1	2	0	3	0	0	3	X	X	9
Northwest Territories (Moss)	1	0	0	1	0	1	0	0	X	X	3

Sheet D	1	2	3	4	5	6	7	8	9	10	Final
Alberta (Balderston)	0	0	2	0	0	0	1	0	0	X	3
Saskatchewan (Ackerman)	1	1	0	1	0	0	0	1	1	X	5

Sheet E	1	2	3	4	5	6	7	8	9	10	Final
Newfoundland and Labrador (Alcock)	1	0	2	3	0	2	0	2	X	X	10
Nunavut (Sattelberger)	0	1	0	0	1	0	1	0	X	X	3

=== Draw 18 ===
Thursday, November 17, 19:00

Sheet B	1	2	3	4	5	6	7	8	9	10	Final
Nova Scotia (Sutherland)	1	1	0	3	0	0	0	2	0	X	7
Yukon (Hamilton)	0	0	1	0	0	1	1	0	1	X	4

Sheet C	1	2	3	4	5	6	7	8	9	10	Final
Northern Ontario (Assad)	0	0	1	0	2	0	2	0	2	1	8
Ontario (Homan)	1	2	0	1	0	4	0	1	0	0	9

Sheet D	1	2	3	4	5	6	7	8	9	10	Final
Northwest Territories (Moss)	2	0	1	0	0	0	1	1	0	X	5
British Columbia (Marshall)	0	4	0	1	1	1	0	0	1	X	8

Sheet E	1	2	3	4	5	6	7	8	9	10	Final
New Brunswick (Robichaud)	2	0	3	0	0	0	1	0	2	X	8
Quebec (Ferland)	0	1	0	1	1	1	0	2	0	X	6

=== Draw 19 ===
Friday, November 18, 9:00

Sheet A	1	2	3	4	5	6	7	8	9	10	Final
Prince Edward Island (Gallant)	2	1	4	0	1	0	2	X	X	X	10
Yukon (Hamilton)	0	0	0	1	0	1	0	X	X	X	2

Sheet B	1	2	3	4	5	6	7	8	9	10	Final
Nunavut (Sattelberger)	1	0	0	1	1	0	2	0	0	X	5
Manitoba (Grassie)	0	3	2	0	0	1	0	0	4	X	10

Sheet C	1	2	3	4	5	6	7	8	9	10	Final
Nova Scotia (Sutherland)	0	1	0	1	0	0	2	1	1	0	6
Newfoundland and Labrador (Alcock)	1	0	1	0	3	1	0	0	0	2	8

== Playoffs ==
Semifinal			Final
			1	Alberta	7
2	New Brunswick	3	3	Saskatchewan	8
3	Saskatchewan	8

=== Semifinal ===
Friday, November 18, 19:00

Team	1	2	3	4	5	6	7	8	9	10	Final
New Brunswick (Robichaud)	0	0	1	0	1	0	0	1	X	X	3
Saskatchewan (Ackerman)	0	1	0	1	0	2	4	0	X	X	8

Player Percentages
New Brunswick		Saskatchewan	
Andre Boudreau	94%	Colleen Ackerman	79%
Marie Richard	73%	Dean Hicke	72%
Marcel Robichaud	81%	Chantelle Eberle	72%
Sylvie Robichaud	66%	Jason Ackerman	84%
Total	79%	Total	77%

=== Final ===
Saturday, November 19, 13:30

Sheet D	1	2	3	4	5	6	7	8	9	10	11	Final
Alberta (Balderston)	3	0	0	0	1	0	0	3	0	0	0	7
Saskatchewan (Ackerman)	0	1	0	1	0	1	1	0	2	1	1	8

Player Percentages
Alberta		Saskatchewan	
Stephanie Malekoff	86%	Colleen Ackerman	88%
Del Shaughnessy	92%	Dean Hicke	77%
Desirée Owen	68%	Chantelle Eberle	75%
Kurt Balderston	61%	Jason Ackerman	81%
Total	77%	Total	80%

2011 Canadian Mixed Curling Championship
(Saskatchewan)
Saskatchewan
7th title
