= Canadian Mixed Curling Championship =

National curling championship

- Established: 1964
- 2026 host city: Woodstock, PEI
- 2026 arena: West Prince Curling Club
- 2026 champion: Nova Scotia

Current edition
- 2026 Canadian Mixed Curling Championship

The Canadian Mixed Curling Championship is the national curling championship for mixed curling in Canada. The winners of the tournament represent Canada at the World Mixed Curling Championship.

In mixed curling, the positions on a team must alternate between men and women. If a man throws last rocks, which is usually the case, the women must throw lead rocks and third rocks, while the other male member of the team throws second rocks. In 2004, Shannon Kleibrink became the only woman to skip a team and win a Canadian Mixed championship.

== History ==
The Canadian Mixed Curling Championship was established in 1964, with Canadian Breweries as the event's sponsor and Frank Sargent as its committee chairman. For the first two years it was held at the Royal Canadian Curling Club in Toronto. The first championship was won by Ernie Boushy of Winnipeg with a record of 9–1.

In 1973, Seagram Distillers became the new official sponsor, until 1983.

Up until 1995, the event was typically held in March, but was bumped up to January that year when Unitel became a sponsor. That was also the year that the "Season of Champions" event series was implemented, and the Page playoffs began to be used.

Unitel's parent company AT&T became the sponsor in 1997, a partnership that only lasted until 1998. The event was dropped as a Season of Champions event in 2004, and was no longer shown on television. In 2005, the page playoff system was dropped and replaced by a 3-team playoff. The 2005 event was bumped up to November of the previous year, and the event has been held in November ever since, and is why the event was not held in the year it was billed as until the COVID-19 pandemic cancelled the November 2020 event.

Starting with the 2008 Championships (held in November 2007), the Canadian Curling Association picked two curlers from the winning team to represent Canada at the World Mixed Doubles Curling Championship. This ended with the 2012 Mixed Championship, with the creation of the Canadian Mixed Doubles Curling Trials.

== Champions ==
The past champions of the event are listed as follows:

=== 1964–1979 ===
Year	Winning Locale	Winning Team	Host
1964	Manitoba	Ernie Boushy, Ina Light, Garry DeBlonde, Bea McKenzie	Toronto, Ontario
1965	Alberta	Lee Green, Kay Berreth, Shirley Salt, Vi Salt	Toronto, Ontario
1966	Manitoba	Ernie Boushy, Ina Light, Garry DeBlonde, Betty Hird	Fort William, Ontario
1967	Saskatchewan	Larry McGrath, Darlene Hill, Peter Gunn, Marlene Dorsett	Québec City, Quebec
1968	Saskatchewan	Larry McGrath, Darlene Hill, Peter Gunn, Marlene Dorsett	Saint Boniface, Manitoba
1969	Alberta	Don Anderson, Bernie Hunter, Bill Tarnish, Connie Reeve	Kitchener, Ontario
1970	Alberta	Bill Mitchell, Hadie Manley, Bill Tarnish, Connie Reeve	Vancouver, British Columbia
1971	Saskatchewan	Larry McGrath, Darlene Hill, John Gunn, Audrey St. John	Saint John, New Brunswick
1972	British Columbia	Trev Fisher, Gail Wren, Bryan Bettesworth, Louise Fisher	Thunder Bay, Ontario
1973	Manitoba	Barry Fry, Peggy Casselman, Stephen Decter, Susan Lynch	Charlottetown, Prince Edward Island
1974	Saskatchewan	Rick Folk, Cheryl Stirton, Tom Wilson, Bonnie Orchard	Winnipeg, Manitoba
1975	Alberta	Les Rowland, Aurdrey Rowland, Dan Schmaltz, Betty Schmaltz	Kitchener, Ontario
1976	British Columbia	Tony Eberts, Elizabeth Short, Clark Glanville, Eleanor Short	Lethbridge, Alberta
1977	Manitoba	Harold Tanasichuk, Rose Tanasichuk, Jim Kirkness, Debbie Orr	Halifax, Nova Scotia
1978	Saskatchewan	Bernie Yuzdepski, Marnie McNiven, Roy Uchman, Joan Bjerke	Saskatoon, Saskatchewan
1979	Northern Ontario	Roy Lund, Nancy Lund, Ron Apland, Marsha Kerr	Prince George, British Columbia

=== 1980–present ===
A playoff was added in 1980.

Year	Winning Locale	Winning Team	Runner up (skip)	Host
1980	Manitoba	Jim Dunstone, Carol Dunstone, Del Stitt, Elaine Jones	Prince Edward Island (John Fortier)	St. John's, Newfoundland and Labrador
1981	Northern Ontario	Rick Lang, Anne Provo, Bert Provo, Lorraine Edwards	Saskatchewan (Rick Folk)	Winnipeg, Manitoba
1982	British Columbia	Glen Pierce, Marlene Neubauer, Fuji Miki, Sharon Bradley	Saskatchewan (Rick Folk)	Timmins, Ontario
1983	Saskatchewan	Rick Folk, Dorenda Schoenhals, Tom Wilson, Elizabeth Folk	Northern Ontario (Scott Hamilton)	Saint John, New Brunswick
1984	Saskatchewan	Randy Woytowich, Kathy Fahlman, Brian McCusker, Jan Betker	Quebec (Kevin Adams)	Prince Albert, Saskatchewan
1985	British Columbia	Steve Skillings, Pat Sanders, Al Carlson, Louise Herlinveaux	Nova Scotia (Dave Jones)	Toronto, Ontario
1986	Ontario	Dave Van Dine, Dawn Ventura, Hugh Millikin, Cindy Wiggins	Alberta (Randy Ferbey)	Kamloops, British Columbia
1987	Prince Edward Island	Peter Gallant, Kathy Gallant, Phil Gorveatt, Simone MacKenzie	Northern Ontario (Gord Tokaryk)	Summerside, Prince Edward Island
1988	Manitoba	Jeff Stoughton, Karen Fallis, Rob Meakin, Lynn Morrow	Alberta (Ken Ursuliak)	North Bay, Ontario
1989	Prince Edward Island	Robert Campbell, Angela Roberts, Mark O'Rourke, Kathy O'Rourke	Manitoba (Jeff Stoughton)	Brandon, Manitoba
1990	Alberta	Marvin Wirth, Glenna Rubin, Millard Evans, Robin Pettit	Manitoba (Howard Restall)	Rimouski, Quebec
1991	Manitoba	Jeff Stoughton, Karen Fallis, Scott Morrow, Lynn Morrow	New Brunswick (Grant Odishaw)	Thunder Bay, Ontario
1992	Alberta	Kurt Balderston, Marcy Balderston, Rod Kramer, Joanne Morrison	Northern Ontario (Jim Adams)	Grande Prairie, Alberta
1993	Nova Scotia	Scott Saunders, Colleen Jones, Tom Fetterly, Helen Radford	Alberta (Terry Meek)	Swift Current, Saskatchewan
1994	New Brunswick	Grant Odishaw, Heather Smith, Rick Perron, Krista Smith	British Columbia (Eric Wiltzen)	Leduc, Alberta
1995	Nova Scotia	Steve Ogden, Mary Mattatall, Jeff Hopkins, Heather Hopkins	Prince Edward Island (Peter MacDonald)	Point Edward, Ontario
1996	Saskatchewan	Randy Bryden, Cathy Trowell, Russ Bryden, Karen Inglis	Ontario (Rich Moffatt)	Charlottetown, Prince Edward Island
1997	Northern Ontario	Chris Johnson, Barb McKinty, Drew Eloranta, Lisa Gauvreau	British Columbia (Eric Wiltzen)	Kindersley, Saskatchewan
1998	Nova Scotia	Steve Ogden, Mary Mattatall, Jeff Hopkins, Heather Hopkins	Ontario (Dean Wadland)	Owen Sound, Ontario
1999	Nova Scotia	Paul Flemming, Colleen Jones, Tom Fetterly, Monica Moriarty	Prince Edward Island (Peter MacDonald)	Victoria, British Columbia
2000	Alberta	Kevin Koe, Susan O'Connor, Greg Northcott, Lawnie Goodfellow	Saskatchewan (Jim Packet)	Lethbridge, Alberta
2001	Quebec	Jean-Michel Ménard, Jessica Marchand, Marco Berthelot, Joëlle Sabourin	Nova Scotia (Mark Dacey)	Weyburn, Saskatchewan
2002	Nova Scotia	Mark Dacey, Heather Smith-Dacey, Rob Harris, Laine Peters	Prince Edward Island (John Likely)	Halifax, Nova Scotia
2003	Nova Scotia	Paul Flemming, Kim Kelly, Tom Fetterly, Cathy Donald	Alberta (Shannon Kleibrink)	Abbotsford, British Columbia
2004	Alberta	Shannon Kleibrink, Richard Kleibrink, Judy Pendergast, Kevin Pendergast	Ontario (Heath McCormick)	Timmins, Ontario
2005	Newfoundland and Labrador	Mark Nichols, Shelley Nichols, Brent Hamilton, Jennifer Guzzwell	Saskatchewan (Kyle George)	Prince Albert, Saskatchewan
2006	Ontario	John Epping, Julie Reddick, Scott Foster, Leigh Armstrong	Manitoba (David Hamblin)	Whitehorse, Yukon
2007	New Brunswick	Terry Odishaw, Becky Atkinson, Kevin Boyle, Jane Boyle	Quebec (Ève Bélisle)	Kitchener, Ontario
2008	Alberta	Dean Ross, Susan O'Connor, Tim Krassman, Susan Wright	Ontario (Bob Turcotte)	Calgary, Alberta
2009	Manitoba	Sean Grassie, Allison Nimik, Ross Derksen, Kendra Green	Ontario (Wayne Tuck Jr.)	Iqaluit, Nunavut
2010	Nova Scotia	Mark Dacey, Heather Smith-Dacey, Andrew Gibson, Jill Mouzar	Ontario (Mark Bice)	Burlington, Ontario
2011	Prince Edward Island	Robert Campbell, Rebecca Jean MacPhee, Robbie Doherty, Jackie Reid	Manitoba (Terry McNamee)	Morris, Manitoba
2012	Saskatchewan	Jason Ackerman, Chantelle Eberle, Dean Hicke, Colleen Ackerman	Alberta (Kurt Balderston)	Sudbury, Ontario
2013	Ontario	Cory Heggestad, Heather Graham, Greg Balsdon, Amy Mackay	Nova Scotia (Brent MacDougall)	Mount Royal, Quebec
2014	Alberta	Darren Moulding, Heather Jensen, Brent Hamilton, Anna-Marie Moulding	Ontario (Cory Heggestad)	Ottawa, Ontario
2015	Saskatchewan	Max Kirkpatrick, Jolene Campbell, Chris Haichert, Teejay Haichert	Northwest Territories (Jamie Koe)	North Bay, Ontario
2016	Alberta	Mick Lizmore, Sarah Wilkes, Brad Thiessen, Alison Kotylak	Saskatchewan (Bruce Korte)	Toronto, Ontario
2017	Northern Ontario	Trevor Bonot, Jackie McCormick, Kory Carr, Megan Carr	Manitoba (Braden Calvert)	Yarmouth, Nova Scotia
2018	Ontario	Mike Anderson, Danielle Inglis, Sean Harrison, Lauren Harrison	Quebec (Robert Desjardins)	Swan River, Manitoba
2019	Manitoba	Colin Kurz, Meghan Walter, Brendan Bilawka, Sara Oliver	Nova Scotia (Kendal Thompson)	Winnipeg, Manitoba
2020	Quebec	Jean-Sébastien Roy, Amélie Blais, Dan deWaard, Brenda Nicholls	New Brunswick (Grant Odishaw)	Saguenay, Quebec
2021 (Note: The original 2021 event, scheduled for November 2020 was cancelled due to COVID-19)	Quebec	Jean-Michel Ménard, Marie-France Larouche, Ian Belleau, Annie Lemay	Ontario (Mike McLean)	Canmore, Alberta
2022	Quebec	Félix Asselin, Laurie St-Georges, Émile Asselin, Emily Riley	Northern Ontario (Trevor Bonot)	Prince Albert, Saskatchewan
2023	Saskatchewan	Shaun Meachem, Kelly Schafer, Chris Haichert, Teejay Haichert	Manitoba (Kyle Kurz)	Swift Current, Saskatchewan
2024	Nova Scotia	Owen Purcell, Christina Black, Adam McEachren, Jenn Baxter	Saskatchewan (Jason Ackerman)	St. Catharines, Ontario
2025	New Brunswick	Rene Comeau, Jennifer Fenwick, Alex Robichaud, Katie Vandenborre	Ontario (Sam Mooibroek)	Assiniboia, Saskatchewan
2026	Nova Scotia	Brent MacDougall, Erin Carmody, Scott Weagle, Marie Christianson	New Brunswick (Sylvie Quillian)	Woodstock, Prince Edward Island
2027				Moncton, New Brunswick

== Championships by province ==
As of 2026

Province	Titles by province
Alberta	11
Saskatchewan	11
Manitoba	9
Nova Scotia	9
British Columbia	4
Northern Ontario	4
Ontario	4
Quebec	4
New Brunswick	3
Prince Edward Island	3
Newfoundland and Labrador	1
