= 1998 Canadian Mixed Curling Championship =

1998 AT&T Canada Canadian Mixed Curling Championship
- Host city: Owen Sound, Ontario
- Arena: Harry Lumley Bayshore Community Centre
- Dates: January 10–18, 1998
- Attendance: 22,147
- Winner: Nova Scotia
- Curling club: Mayflower Curling Club, Halifax, Nova Scotia
- Skip: Steve Ogden
- Third: Mary Mattatall
- Second: Jeff Hopkins
- Lead: Heather Hopkins
- Finalist: Ontario

The 1998 AT&T Canada Canadian Mixed Curling Championship was held January 10–18 at the Harry Lumley Bayshore Community Centre in Owen Sound, Ontario.

Nova Scotia won its third national mixed championship, after skip Steve Ogden made a tap back for two points in the last end to defeat Ontario, 8-7. Ogden had previously won a mixed title in 1995.

The semifinals and finals were televised on TSN.

The total attendance for the event was 22,147 which was a record at the time. Saskatchewan's Warren Betker won the sportsmanship award.

== Teams ==
Teams were as follows:

| Locale | Skip | Third | Second | Lead | Club |
|---|---|---|---|---|---|
| Alberta | Kurt Balderston | Marcy Balderston | Les Sonnenberg | Karen McNamee | Sexsmith |
| British Columbia | Grant Dezura | Diane Nelson | Bill Fisher | Susan Allen | Golden Ears |
| Manitoba | Rob Fowler | Lois Fowler | Mark Taylor | Sharon Fowler | Brandon |
| New Brunswick | Vance LeCocq | Karen McDermott | Marc LeCocq | Cindy LeCocq | Bathurst |
| Newfoundland | Garry Pinsent | Barbara Ann Pinsent | Dennis Langdon | Kathy Langdon | Carol |
| Northern Ontario | Rick Stewart | Valerie MacInnes | Neil MacInnes | Marianne Kentish | McIntyre |
| Nova Scotia | Steve Ogden | Mary Mattatall | Jeff Hopkins | Heather Hopkins | Mayflower |
| Ontario | Dean Wadland | Cheryl McPherson | Paul Wadland | Marian Arai | Bayview |
| Prince Edward Island | Mike Gaudet | Leslie Allan | Brian Scales | Lori Robinson | Silver Fox |
| Quebec | Claude Brazeau | Cheryl Morgan | François Gagné | Josée Friolet | Longue Pointe |
| Saskatchewan | Warren Betker | Deanne Miller-Jones | Jaime Miller | Sloane Girardin | Weyburn |
| Northwest Territories/Yukon | Gerry Menard | Twyla Tincher | Lloyd Stang | Ann Lange | Yellowknife |

== Standings ==
Final standings

Key
| Teams to Playoffs |
| Teams to Tiebreaker |

| Province | Skip | Wins | Losses |
|---|---|---|---|
| Alberta | Kurt Balderston | 10 | 1 |
| Nova Scotia | Steve Ogden | 8 | 3 |
| Northern Ontario | Rick Stewart | 7 | 4 |
| Ontario | Dean Wadland | 6 | 5 |
| Manitoba | Rob Fowler | 6 | 5 |
| British Columbia | Grant Dezura | 6 | 5 |
| Saskatchewan | Warren Betker | 6 | 5 |
| Quebec | Claude Brazeau | 6 | 5 |
| New Brunswick | Vance LeCocq | 4 | 7 |
| Northwest Territories / Yukon | Gerry Menard | 3 | 8 |
| Prince Edward Island | Mike Gaudet | 2 | 9 |
| Newfoundland | Garry Pinsent | 2 | 9 |

== Tiebreakers ==
- Saskatchewan 8-4 Manitoba
- Ontario 5-3 Saskatchewan
- Quebec 10-5 British Columbia
- Ontario 11-2 Quebec

== Playoffs ==
Page playoff system
1 | Alberta | 4
2 | Nova Scotia | 7
3 | Northern Ontario | 5
4 | Ontario | 6

Semifinal
1 | Alberta | 6
4 | Ontario | 9

Final
2 | Nova Scotia | 8
4 | Ontario | 7
