= 2008 Canadian Mixed Curling Championship =

- Host city: Calgary, Alberta
- Arena: Calgary Curling Club
- Dates: November 10–16, 2007
- Winner: Alberta
- Curling club: Calgary Curling Club & North Hill Curling Club, Calgary
- Skip: Dean Ross
- Third: Susan O'Connor
- Second: Tim Krassman
- Lead: Susan Wright
- Finalist: Ontario (Bob Turcotte)

The 2008 Canadian Mixed Curling Championship was held from 10–16 November 2007, at the Calgary Curling Club in Calgary, Alberta. Two members of the winning team represented Canada at the 2008 World Mixed Doubles Curling Championship.

== Teams ==
Locale	Skip	Third	Second	Lead
Alberta	Dean Ross	Susan O'Connor	Tim Krassman	Susan Wright
British Columbia	Bryan Miki	Adina Tasaka	Jay Batch	Jacalyn Brown
Manitoba	Reid Carruthers	Theresa Cannon	Jason Gunnlaugson	Sarah Wazney
New Brunswick	Jamie Brannen	Heather Munn	Nick Munn	Lesley Hicks Brannen
Newfoundland and Labrador	Brian Bailey	Susan Curtis	Gary Alcock	Diane Keating
Northern Ontario	Mike Assad	Ashley Miharija	Mike McCarville	Larissa Stevens
Nova Scotia	Peter Burgess	Colleen Pinkney	Chuck Patriquin	Shelley MacNutt
Ontario	Bob Turcotte	Kristin Turcotte	Roy Weigand	Andrea Lawes
Prince Edward Island	Kyle Stevenson	Tammi Lowther	Doug MacGregor	Tricia Affleck
Quebec	Simon Dupuis	Isabelle Néron	Jean-François Charest	Marie-Josee Precourt
Saskatchewan	Ian Mayoh	Susan Altman	Neil Vaughan	Marcia Indzeoski
Yukon/Northwest Territories	Wade Scoffin	Nicole Baldwin	James Buyck	Helen Strong

== Standings ==
Province	Skip	Wins	Losses
Alberta	Dean Ross	10	1
Ontario	Bob Turcotte	8	3
Nova Scotia	Peter Burgess	7	4
Quebec	Simon Dupuis	7	4
British Columbia	Bryan Miki	6	5
Northern Ontario	Mike Assad	6	5
Manitoba	Reid Carruthers	5	6
New Brunswick	Jamie Brannen	4	7
Prince Edward Island	Kyle Stevenson	4	7
Saskatchewan	Ian Mayoh	3	8
Newfoundland and Labrador	Brian Bailey	3	8
Yukon/Northwest Territories	Wade Scoffin	3	8

== Playoffs ==
- Tie-breaker: Nova Scotia 8-5 Quebec
- Semi-final: Ontario 11-5 Nova Scotia
- Final: Alberta 5-4 Ontario
