= 2003 Canadian Mixed Curling Championship =

- Host city: Abbotsford, British Columbia
- Arena: Abbotsford Recreation Centre
- Dates: January 11–19, 2003
- Winner: Nova Scotia
- Curling club: Halifax CC, Halifax, Nova Scotia
- Skip: Paul Flemming
- Third: Kim Kelly
- Second: Tom Fetterly
- Lead: Cathy Donald
- Finalist: Alberta (Shannon Kleibrink)

The 2003 Canadian Mixed Curling Championship was held January 11–19 at the Abbotsford Recreation Centre in Abbotsford, British Columbia.

Nova Scotia's Paul Flemming rink beat Alberta's Shannon Kleibrink in the final. Kleibrink was the first woman to ever skip a team at the Mixed. She would go on to win the event in 2004.

== Teams ==
Province / Territory	Skip	Third	Second	Lead
Alberta	Shannon Kleibrink	Richard Kleibrink	Amy Nixon	Mike Westlund
British Columbia	Fred Thomson	Heather Griffiths	Brent Pihowich	Allison Hurley
Manitoba	Kelly Robertson	Amber Dawson	Geordie Hargreaves	Kristen Williamson
New Brunswick	Wayne Tallon	Sandy Comeau	Kevin Keefe	Stacey Leger
Newfoundland and Labrador	Garry Pinsent	Barbara Pinsent	Gerry Nichols	Joyce Nichols
Northern Ontario	David MacInnes	Valerie MacInnes	Neil MacInnes	Judy MacInnes
Nova Scotia	Paul Flemming	Kim Kelly	Tom Fetterly	Cathy Donald
Ontario	Nick Rizzo	Jo-Ann Rizzo	Gareth Parry	Vicki Advent
Prince Edward Island	Andrew Robinson	Pamela Jay	Tyler Harris	Paula Creamer
Quebec	Jean-Pierre Venne	Tracey Knox	Daniel Lafleur	Carole Moreau
Saskatchewan	Bryan Derbowka	Cathy Trowell	Gerry Adam	Karen Cottenie
Yukon/Northwest Territories	Chad Cowan	Donna Scott	Bernie Adilman	Dawn Cowan

== Standings ==
Locale	Skip	W	L
Nova Scotia	Paul Flemming	10	1
Saskatchewan	Bryan Derbowka	10	1
Alberta	Shannon Kleibrink	9	2
Manitoba	Kelly Robertson	6	5
Ontario	Nick Rizzo	6	5
New Brunswick	Wayne Tallon	6	5
British Columbia	Fred Thomson	5	6
Northern Ontario	David MacInnes	4	7
Quebec	Jean-Pierre Venne	4	7
Prince Edward Island	Andrew Robinson	3	8
Yukon/Northwest Territories	Chad Cowan	2	9
Newfoundland and Labrador	Garry Pinsent	1	10

== Results ==
=== Draw 1 ===
Sheet A	1	2	3	4	5	6	7	8	9	10	Final
New Brunswick (Tallon)	0	1	0	2	0	0	0	0	0	X	3
Nova Scotia (Flemming) 🔨	1	0	1	0	0	1	1	3	2	X	9

Sheet B	1	2	3	4	5	6	7	8	9	10	Final
British Columbia (Thomson) 🔨	1	0	0	0	0	2	0	1	0	0	4
Ontario (Rizzo)	0	0	1	1	1	0	1	0	2	3	9

Sheet C	1	2	3	4	5	6	7	8	9	10	Final
Yukon/Northwest Territories (Cowan) 🔨	1	0	0	0	1	0	0	0	0	X	2
Alberta (Kleibrink)	0	0	2	1	0	0	0	2	6	X	11

Sheet D	1	2	3	4	5	6	7	8	9	10	Final
Manitoba (Robertson) 🔨	0	0	0	0	2	0	0	0	3	X	5
Prince Edward Island (Robinson)	0	0	0	0	0	1	1	0	0	X	2

Sheet E	1	2	3	4	5	6	7	8	9	10	Final
Quebec (Venne) 🔨	0	0	0	1	0	1	0	1	0	X	3
Saskatchewan (Derbowka)	0	1	1	0	1	0	2	0	1	X	6

Sheet F	1	2	3	4	5	6	7	8	9	10	Final
Newfoundland and Labrador (Pinsent)	0	0	1	0	0	0	0	1	2	0	4
Northern Ontario (MacInnes) 🔨	0	1	0	0	2	0	0	0	0	2	5

=== Draw 2 ===
Sheet A	1	2	3	4	5	6	7	8	9	10	Final
Northern Ontario (MacInnes) 🔨	2	0	1	1	0	1	0	1	1	X	7
Quebec (Venne)	0	1	0	0	2	0	1	0	0	X	4

Sheet B	1	2	3	4	5	6	7	8	9	10	Final
Saskatchewan (Derbowka) 🔨	0	2	0	0	0	2	2	0	2	X	8
Manitoba (Robertson)	0	0	0	1	2	0	0	1	0	X	4

Sheet C	1	2	3	4	5	6	7	8	9	10	Final
Prince Edward Island (Robinson) 🔨	1	0	0	4	0	3	0	1	0	X	9
Yukon/Northwest Territories (Cowan)	0	0	1	0	2	0	1	0	1	X	5

Sheet D	1	2	3	4	5	6	7	8	9	10	Final
Alberta (Kleibrink) 🔨	0	0	0	0	2	0	2	0	1	0	5
British Columbia (Thomson)	0	1	1	1	0	1	0	2	0	1	7

Sheet E	1	2	3	4	5	6	7	8	9	10	Final
Newfoundland and Labrador (Pinsent) 🔨	0	0	0	0	0	1	0	X	X	X	1
New Brunswick (Tallon)	1	0	0	0	3	0	4	X	X	X	8

Sheet F	1	2	3	4	5	6	7	8	9	10	Final
Ontario (Rizzo) 🔨	1	1	0	1	0	0	0	1	1	0	5
Nova Scotia (Flemming)	0	0	1	0	0	1	3	0	0	1	6

=== Draw 3 ===
Sheet A	1	2	3	4	5	6	7	8	9	10	Final
Nova Scotia (Flemming) 🔨	0	1	0	1	1	0	0	1	0	X	4
Alberta (Kleibrink)	2	0	1	0	0	0	2	0	2	X	7

Sheet B	1	2	3	4	5	6	7	8	9	10	Final
New Brunswick (Tallon) 🔨	3	0	0	2	1	0	3	X	X	X	9
Ontario (Rizzo)	0	1	1	0	0	2	0	X	X	X	4

Sheet C	1	2	3	4	5	6	7	8	9	10	Final
British Columbia (Thomson) 🔨	1	0	1	0	1	0	1	1	0	2	7
Prince Edward Island (Robinson)	0	2	0	2	0	0	0	0	2	0	6

Sheet D	1	2	3	4	5	6	7	8	9	10	Final
Yukon/Northwest Territories (Cowan) 🔨	2	0	0	0	2	0	0	1	0	0	5
Saskatchewan (Derbowka)	0	2	1	1	0	0	2	0	0	1	7

Sheet E	1	2	3	4	5	6	7	8	9	10	Final
Manitoba (Robertson) 🔨	0	2	0	0	1	0	1	0	1	X	5
Northern Ontario (MacInnes)	0	0	0	1	0	1	0	1	0	X	3

Sheet F	1	2	3	4	5	6	7	8	9	10	Final
Quebec (Venne) 🔨	3	0	1	0	3	2	0	0	1	X	10
Newfoundland and Labrador (Pinsent)	0	2	0	2	0	0	0	1	0	X	5

=== Draw 4 ===
Sheet A	1	2	3	4	5	6	7	8	9	10	Final
Newfoundland and Labrador (Pinsent) 🔨	1	0	2	0	1	0	1	0	1	X	6
Manitoba (Robertson)	0	2	0	2	0	2	0	1	0	X	7

Sheet B	1	2	3	4	5	6	7	8	9	10	Final
Northern Ontario (MacInnes) 🔨	2	0	2	1	0	2	0	3	X	X	10
Yukon/Northwest Territories (Cowan)	0	1	0	0	1	0	3	0	X	X	5

Sheet C	1	2	3	4	5	6	7	8	9	10	Final
Saskatchewan (Derbowka) 🔨	0	1	0	1	0	1	0	3	0	X	6
British Columbia (Thomson)	0	0	1	0	2	0	0	0	1	X	4

Sheet D	1	2	3	4	5	6	7	8	9	10	Final
Quebec (Venne) 🔨	0	0	2	0	1	0	0	0	1	X	4
New Brunswick (Tallon)	1	0	0	1	0	0	2	3	0	X	7

Sheet E	1	2	3	4	5	6	7	8	9	10	Final
Prince Edward Island (Robinson) 🔨	0	0	0	1	0	0	1	0	X	X	2
Nova Scotia (Flemming)	1	1	1	0	1	1	0	2	X	X	7

Sheet F	1	2	3	4	5	6	7	8	9	10	Final
Alberta (Kleibrink) 🔨	0	1	0	2	0	2	0	2	0	X	7
Ontario (Rizzo)	0	0	1	0	2	0	2	0	1	X	6

=== Draw 5 ===
Sheet A	1	2	3	4	5	6	7	8	9	10	Final
Ontario (Rizzo) 🔨	0	0	5	0	2	0	3	X	X	X	10
Prince Edward Island (Robinson)	1	0	0	1	0	1	0	X	X	X	3

Sheet B	1	2	3	4	5	6	7	8	9	10	Final
Nova Scotia (Flemming) 🔨	2	0	1	0	0	1	3	0	0	X	7
Saskatchewan (Derbowka)	0	1	0	1	0	0	0	2	1	X	5

Sheet C	1	2	3	4	5	6	7	8	9	10	Final
New Brunswick (Tallon) 🔨	2	0	0	0	1	0	0	0	1	X	4
Alberta (Kleibrink)	0	0	3	2	0	1	0	1	0	X	7

Sheet D	1	2	3	4	5	6	7	8	9	10	Final
British Columbia (Thomson) 🔨	0	0	1	0	0	2	0	1	0	X	4
Northern Ontario (MacInnes)	1	0	0	1	1	0	2	0	1	X	6

Sheet E	1	2	3	4	5	6	7	8	9	10	Final
Yukon/Northwest Territories (Cowan) 🔨	2	0	0	0	0	0	2	0	0	X	4
Newfoundland and Labrador (Pinsent)	0	0	0	0	1	0	0	0	1	X	2

Sheet F	1	2	3	4	5	6	7	8	9	10	11	Final
Manitoba (Robertson) 🔨	1	0	0	0	1	0	2	0	1	0	0	5
Quebec (Venne)	0	0	1	0	0	1	0	1	0	2	1	6

=== Draw 6 ===
Sheet A	1	2	3	4	5	6	7	8	9	10	Final
Quebec (Venne) 🔨	1	0	1	0	0	0	0	3	0	3	8
Yukon/Northwest Territories (Cowan)	0	1	0	2	0	1	2	0	0	0	6

Sheet B	1	2	3	4	5	6	7	8	9	10	Final
Newfoundland and Labrador (Pinsent) 🔨	1	0	0	1	0	0	0	2	0	X	4
British Columbia (Thomson)	0	1	2	0	0	0	3	0	2	X	8

Sheet C	1	2	3	4	5	6	7	8	9	10	Final
Manitoba (Robertson) 🔨	1	0	3	3	0	1	1	0	X	X	9
New Brunswick (Tallon)	0	2	0	0	2	0	0	1	X	X	5

Sheet D	1	2	3	4	5	6	7	8	9	10	Final
Northern Ontario (MacInnes) 🔨	0	2	0	0	1	0	1	0	0	X	4
Nova Scotia (Flemming)	0	0	2	1	0	1	0	1	1	X	6

Sheet E	1	2	3	4	5	6	7	8	9	10	Final
Saskatchewan (Derbowka) 🔨	1	0	0	3	0	0	3	0	1	X	8
Ontario (Rizzo)	0	0	2	0	2	0	0	1	0	X	5

Sheet F	1	2	3	4	5	6	7	8	9	10	Final
Prince Edward Island (Robinson) 🔨	1	0	0	1	0	1	0	0	0	X	3
Alberta (Kleibrink)	0	0	2	0	2	0	0	0	3	X	7

=== Draw 7 ===
Sheet A	1	2	3	4	5	6	7	8	9	10	Final
Alberta (Kleibrink) 🔨	2	0	0	2	0	1	0	0	2	0	7
Saskatchewan (Derbowka)	0	1	1	0	1	0	0	3	0	2	8

Sheet B	1	2	3	4	5	6	7	8	9	10	Final
Ontario (Rizzo) 🔨	1	2	0	2	1	1	X	X	X	X	7
Northern Ontario (MacInnes)	0	0	1	0	0	0	X	X	X	X	1

Sheet C	1	2	3	4	5	6	7	8	9	10	Final
Nova Scotia (Flemming) 🔨	2	0	0	1	0	3	0	0	0	X	6
Newfoundland and Labrador (Pinsent)	0	2	0	0	1	0	1	0	0	X	4

Sheet D	1	2	3	4	5	6	7	8	9	10	Final
New Brunswick (Tallon) 🔨	1	0	0	2	1	0	2	0	2	X	8
Prince Edward Island (Robinson)	0	0	2	0	0	2	0	1	0	X	5

Sheet E	1	2	3	4	5	6	7	8	9	10	11	Final
British Columbia (Thomson) 🔨	1	0	2	0	0	0	2	0	3	0	1	9
Quebec (Venne)	0	0	0	0	3	3	0	1	0	1	0	8

Sheet F	1	2	3	4	5	6	7	8	9	10	Final
Yukon/Northwest Territories (Cowan) 🔨	0	1	0	0	1	0	1	0	X	X	3
Manitoba (Robertson)	1	0	1	1	0	2	0	2	X	X	7

=== Draw 8 ===
Sheet A	1	2	3	4	5	6	7	8	9	10	Final
Manitoba (Robertson) 🔨	0	0	0	2	0	0	1	0	4	X	7
British Columbia (Thomson)	0	1	0	0	1	0	0	1	0	X	3

Sheet B	1	2	3	4	5	6	7	8	9	10	Final
Yukon/Northwest Territories (Cowan) 🔨	1	0	0	0	1	0	3	0	1	X	6
New Brunswick (Tallon)	0	0	0	3	0	4	0	2	0	X	9

Sheet C	1	2	3	4	5	6	7	8	9	10	Final
Quebec (Venne) 🔨	0	1	4	0	1	0	0	1	0	0	7
Nova Scotia (Flemming)	2	0	0	2	0	3	0	0	0	2	9

Sheet D	1	2	3	4	5	6	7	8	9	10	Final
Newfoundland and Labrador (Pinsent) 🔨	0	1	0	1	0	1	0	1	0	X	4
Ontario (Rizzo)	0	0	1	0	1	0	3	0	1	X	6

Sheet E	1	2	3	4	5	6	7	8	9	10	Final
Northern Ontario (MacInnes) 🔨	1	1	0	0	1	0	1	0	0	X	4
Alberta (Kleibrink)	0	0	2	1	0	1	0	2	0	X	6

Sheet F	1	2	3	4	5	6	7	8	9	10	Final
Saskatchewan (Derbowka) 🔨	1	1	0	4	0	0	2	0	1	X	9
Prince Edward Island (Robinson)	0	0	1	0	1	1	0	1	0	X	4

=== Draw 9 ===
Sheet A	1	2	3	4	5	6	7	8	9	10	Final
Prince Edward Island (Robinson) 🔨	4	0	3	0	1	1	0	X	X	X	9
Northern Ontario (MacInnes)	0	1	0	2	0	0	1	X	X	X	4

Sheet B	1	2	3	4	5	6	7	8	9	10	Final
Alberta (Kleibrink) 🔨	1	0	3	0	0	0	0	1	0	1	6
Newfoundland and Labrador (Pinsent)	0	2	0	0	0	0	1	0	1	0	4

Sheet C	1	2	3	4	5	6	7	8	9	10	Final
Ontario (Rizzo) 🔨	1	0	0	0	0	0	1	1	0	X	3
Quebec (Venne)	0	0	0	0	1	3	0	0	1	X	5

Sheet D	1	2	3	4	5	6	7	8	9	10	11	Final
Nova Scotia (Flemming) 🔨	1	0	0	1	0	0	1	0	2	0	1	6
Manitoba (Robertson)	0	1	0	0	1	0	0	2	0	1	0	5

Sheet E	1	2	3	4	5	6	7	8	9	10	Final
New Brunswick (Tallon) 🔨	1	0	0	0	0	0	0	X	X	X	1
Saskatchewan (Derbowka)	0	0	3	0	1	2	1	X	X	X	7

Sheet F	1	2	3	4	5	6	7	8	9	10	Final
British Columbia (Thomson) 🔨	1	0	1	0	0	1	0	1	0	X	4
Yukon/Northwest Territories (Cowan)	0	2	0	0	2	0	2	0	1	X	7

=== Draw 10 ===
Sheet A	1	2	3	4	5	6	7	8	9	10	Final
British Columbia (Thomson) 🔨	0	1	0	2	0	0	2	0	2	X	7
New Brunswick (Tallon)	0	0	1	0	0	2	0	2	0	X	5

Sheet B	1	2	3	4	5	6	7	8	9	10	Final
Yukon/Northwest Territories (Cowan) 🔨	0	1	0	0	2	0	0	1	0	0	4
Nova Scotia (Flemming)	0	0	1	1	0	0	1	0	0	4	7

Sheet C	1	2	3	4	5	6	7	8	9	10	Final
Northern Ontario (MacInnes) 🔨	1	0	0	1	0	0	2	0	0	1	5
Saskatchewan (Derbowka)	0	0	0	0	2	1	0	2	1	0	6

Sheet D	1	2	3	4	5	6	7	8	9	10	Final
Quebec (Venne) 🔨	1	0	0	0	2	0	1	0	1	X	5
Alberta (Kleibrink)	0	1	1	1	0	3	0	2	0	X	8

Sheet E	1	2	3	4	5	6	7	8	9	10	Final
Manitoba (Robertson) 🔨	0	1	0	2	0	1	0	0	1	0	5
Ontario (Rizzo)	0	0	2	0	3	0	0	1	0	0	6

Sheet F	1	2	3	4	5	6	7	8	9	10	Final
Newfoundland and Labrador (Pinsent) 🔨	0	2	0	2	0	0	2	0	1	0	7
Prince Edward Island (Robinson)	0	0	2	0	1	1	0	1	0	1	6

=== Draw 11 ===
Sheet A	1	2	3	4	5	6	7	8	9	10	Final
Saskatchewan (Derbowka) 🔨	3	0	3	0	0	0	1	X	X	X	7
Newfoundland and Labrador (Pinsent)	0	1	0	1	0	0	0	X	X	X	2

Sheet B	1	2	3	4	5	6	7	8	9	10	Final
Prince Edward Island (Robinson) 🔨	4	0	3	1	0	2	X	X	X	X	10
Quebec (Venne)	0	1	0	0	1	0	X	X	X	X	2

Sheet C	1	2	3	4	5	6	7	8	9	10	Final
Alberta (Kleibrink) 🔨	1	0	1	0	0	1	3	0	1	X	7
Manitoba (Robertson)	0	0	0	1	0	0	0	2	0	X	3

Sheet D	1	2	3	4	5	6	7	8	9	10	Final
Ontario (Rizzo) 🔨	1	3	0	2	0	0	0	5	X	X	11
Yukon/Northwest Territories (Cowan)	0	0	2	0	0	0	2	0	X	X	4

Sheet E	1	2	3	4	5	6	7	8	9	10	Final
Nova Scotia (Flemming) 🔨	2	0	0	3	1	4	0	1	X	X	11
British Columbia (Thomson)	0	0	2	0	0	0	3	0	X	X	5

Sheet F	1	2	3	4	5	6	7	8	9	10	Final
New Brunswick (Tallon) 🔨	2	2	0	0	1	0	1	0	3	X	9
Northern Ontario (MacInnes)	0	0	1	1	0	1	0	2	0	X	5

== Tiebreakers ==
=== Tiebreaker #1 ===
Sheet E	1	2	3	4	5	6	7	8	9	10	Final
New Brunswick (Tallon)	0	1	0	1	0	2	0	1	0	X	5
Ontario (Rizzo) 🔨	2	0	2	0	1	0	2	0	0	X	7

Player percentages
New Brunswick		Ontario	
Stacey Leger	78%	Vicki Advent	80%
Kevin Keefe	71%	Gareth Parry	85%
Sandy Comeau	78%	Jo-Ann Rizzo	84%
Wayne Tallon	83%	Nick Rizzo	91%
Total	77%	Total	85%

=== Tiebreaker #2 ===
Sheet D	1	2	3	4	5	6	7	8	9	10	Final
Ontario (Rizzo)	0	2	1	0	1	0	0	1	0	3	8
Manitoba (Robertson) 🔨	0	0	0	1	0	1	3	0	2	0	7

Player percentages
Ontario		Manitoba	
Vicki Advent	85%	Kristen Williamson	85%
Gareth Parry	85%	Geordie Hargreaves	79%
Jo-Ann Rizzo	94%	Amber Dawson	86%
Nick Rizzo	74%	Kelly Robertson	75%
Total	84%	Total	81%

== Playoffs ==
Page playoff system
1	Nova Scotia	4
2	Saskatchewan	3
3	Alberta	8
4	Ontario	7

Semifinal
2	Saskatchewan	5
3	Alberta	6

Final
1	Nova Scotia	12
3	Alberta	11

=== 1 vs. 2 ===
Sheet E	1	2	3	4	5	6	7	8	9	10	Final
Nova Scotia (Flemming) 🔨	1	0	0	2	0	0	0	0	0	1	4
Saskatchewan (Derbowka)	0	0	1	0	0	1	1	0	0	0	3

Player percentages
Nova Scotia		Saskatchewan	
Cathy Donald	93%	Karen Cottenie	86%
Tom Fetterly	86%	Gerry Adam	89%
Kim Kelly	84%	Cathy Trowell	83%
Paul Flemming	93%	Bryan Derbowka	96%
Total	89%	Total	88%

=== 3 vs. 4 ===
Sheet E	1	2	3	4	5	6	7	8	9	10	Final
Alberta (Kleibrink) 🔨	2	1	1	0	0	1	0	1	0	2	8
Ontario (Rizzo)	0	0	0	3	1	0	2	0	1	0	7

Player percentages
Alberta		Ontario	
Mike Westlund	93%	Vicki Advent	85%
Amy Nixon	81%	Gareth Parry	95%
Richard Kleibrink	78%	Jo-Ann Rizzo	80%
Shannon Kleibrink	69%	Nick Rizzo	73%
Total	80%	Total	83%

=== Semifinal ===
Sheet E	1	2	3	4	5	6	7	8	9	10	Final
Saskatchewan (Derbowka) 🔨	0	1	0	0	1	0	2	0	1	0	5
Alberta (Kleibrink)	0	0	1	1	0	2	0	0	0	2	6

Player percentages
Saskatchewan		Alberta	
Karen Cottenie	93%	Mike Westlund	89%
Gerry Adam	86%	Amy Nixon	81%
Cathy Trowell	85%	Richard Kleibrink	74%
Bryan Derbowka	84%	Shannon Kleibrink	87%
Total	87%	Total	83%

=== Final ===
Sheet E	1	2	3	4	5	6	7	8	9	10	11	Final
Nova Scotia (Flemming) 🔨	2	0	3	0	1	0	2	0	3	0	1	12
Alberta (Kleibrink)	0	3	0	2	0	3	0	2	0	1	0	11

Player percentages
Nova Scotia		Alberta	
Cathy Donald	90%	Mike Westlund	95%
Tom Fetterly	83%	Amy Nixon	89%
Kim Kelly	78%	Richard Kleibrink	76%
Paul Flemming	86%	Shannon Kleibrink	76%
Total	84%	Total	84%
