= 1995 Canadian Mixed Curling Championship =

1995 Unitel Canadian Mixed Curling Championship
- Host city: Point Edward, Ontario
- Arena: Sarnia Golf & Curling Club
- Dates: January 7–15, 1995
- Winner: Nova Scotia
- Curling club: Mayflower Curling Club, Halifax, Nova Scotia
- Skip: Steve Ogden
- Third: Mary Mattatall
- Second: Jeff Hopkins
- Lead: Heather Hopkins
- Finalist: Prince Edward Island

The 1995 Unitel Canadian Mixed Curling Championship was held January 7-15 at the Sarnia Golf & Curling Club in Point Edward, Ontario.

Nova Scotia, skipped by Steve Ogden defeated Prince Edward Island, skipped by Peter MacDonald in the final. It was the province's second national mixed championship in three years. Ogden had to raise a rock to the four foot in the 10th and final end to claim a 6-5 victory. Ogden's rink also consisted of Mary Mattatall, Jeff Hopkins and Heather Hopkins.

For the first time, the final was televised nationally on TSN. After inking a 5-year agreement worth over $1,000,000, the tournament was sponsored by Unitel for the first time, was the first event of the new "Season of Champions" group of televised curling tournaments put on by the Canadian Curling Association. The event was also moved up the calendar year from March.

== Format ==
Fourteen teams played a round robin tournament, with the top four making the playoffs. The playoffs were held using the page playoff system for the first time (The Brier and Tournament of Hearts also adopted this system in 1995). The previous tournament had the 14 teams divided into two pools.

== Teams ==
Teams were as follows:

Locale	Skip	Third	Second	Lead	City
Alberta	Mike Sali	Donna Choptuik	Richard Kleibrink	Karin Fletcher	Airdrie
British Columbia	Alan Roemer	Lynda Roemer	Mark Futcher	Susan Allen	Vancouver
Manitoba	Scott Brown	Lori Zeller	Tom McGimpsey	Lori Lang	Winnipeg
New Brunswick	Grant Odishaw	Heather Smith	Rick Perron	Krista Smith	Moncton
Newfoundland	Roger Mabay	Cynthia Young	Fred Starkes	Ruby Starkes	St. John's
Northern Ontario	Jeffrey Henderson	Valerie MacInnes	Marc Butler	Wendy Fenerty	Timmins
Northwest Territories	Jack MacKinnon	Juanita Case	Darren Murdock	Maureen Brockman	Yellowknife
Nova Scotia	Steve Ogden	Mary Mattatall	Jeff Hopkins	Heather Hopkins	Halifax
Ontario	Jim Marshall	Betty Kirouac	Paul MacDonald	Wendy Marshall	Trenton
Ontario (Host)	Ed Werenich	Jane Hooper	Pat Perroud	Linda Werenich	Toronto
Prince Edward Island	Peter MacDonald	Karen A. MacDonald	Rod MacDonald	Karen E. MacDonald	Summerside
Quebec	Guy Hemmings	Nathalie Audet	Guy Thibaudeau	Josee Beaudet	Tracy
Saskatchewan	Grant McGrath	Kim Hodson	Mark Dacey	Linda Horley	Saskatoon
Yukon	Orest Peech	Mardy Derby	Pat Paslawski	Wendy Halea	Whitehorse

== Standings ==
Final standings

Key
Teams to Playoffs
Teams to Tiebreaker

Province	Skip	Wins	Losses
Nova Scotia	Steve Ogden	11	2
Prince Edward Island	Peter MacDonald	9	4
Alberta	Mike Sali	9	4
Ontario (Host)	Ed Werenich	8	5
British Columbia	Alan Roemer	8	5
Manitoba	Scott Brown	7	6
New Brunswick	Grant Odishaw	7	6
Quebec	Guy Hemmings	7	6
Saskatchewan	Grant McGrath	7	6
Northern Ontario	Jeffrey Henderson	7	6
Yukon	Orest Peech	4	9
Ontario	James Marshall	4	9
Newfoundland	Roger Mabey	3	10
Northwest Territories	Jack MacKinnon	0	13

== Tiebreakers ==
- Ontario (Host) 7, British Columbia 6
- Prince Edward Island 8, Alberta 6 (for second place)

== Playoffs ==
Page playoff system
1	Nova Scotia	3
2	Prince Edward Island	4
3	Alberta	4
4	Ontario (Host)	2

Semifinal
1	Nova Scotia	10
3	Alberta	5

Final
2	Prince Edward Island	5
1	Nova Scotia	6

== Final ==
January 15, 3pm

Sheet	1	2	3	4	5	6	7	8	9	10	Final
Prince Edward Island (MacDonald)	0	0	0	1	1	0	2	0	1	0	5
Nova Scotia (Ogden) 🔨	2	0	1	0	0	1	0	1	0	1	6
