= Mary Mattatall =

Canadian curler

Mary Mattatall (born April 22, 1960, in Halifax, Nova Scotia) is a Canadian curler and coach from Dartmouth, Nova Scotia.

== Career ==
=== Juniors ===
Mattatall won the 1979 Nova Scotia junior women's title with teammates Faith Tregunno, Susan McCurdy and Debbie Jennex.

=== Mixed ===
Mattatall has found the most success in her curling career representing Nova Scotia at the Canadian Mixed Curling Championship. She won the event twice, in 1995 and 1998, both times throwing third stones for skip Steve Ogden. She also placed second at the 1985 Canadian Mixed, throwing third for Dave Jones. She last played in the mixed at the 2014 Canadian Mixed Curling Championship playing third for Rob Harris, finishing in sixth place.

=== Women's ===
Mattatall won her first Nova Scotia Tournament of Hearts in 1989, playing third for Colleen Jones. At the 1989 Scott Tournament of Hearts, the Canadian national women's championship, the team would finish the round robin with a 7–4 record, and lost in a tiebreaker match. Mattatall returned to the national Tournament of Hearts in 1990 as an alternate for Heather Rankin, though she did not play in any games. The Jones rink would win the Nova Scotia Hearts in 1991 and would play at the 1991 Scott Tournament of Hearts, where they finished with a 5–6 record in 7th place. They won again in 1992 and finished with a 6–5 record (6th place) at the 1992 Scott Tournament of Hearts. Mattatall was invited to join the Jones rink as an alternate at the 1997 Scott Tournament of Hearts, the team finished with a 4–7 record, tied for 9th. Mattatall would play in one match.

Mattatall skipped a team at the 1997 Canadian Olympic Curling Trials, but finished in last place with a 2–7 record. Her new rink of Angie Bryant, Lisa MacLeod and Heather Hopkins won the 1998 Nova Scotia Tournament of Hearts. The team represented Nova Scotia at the 1998 Scott Tournament of Hearts. They would finish with a 4–7 record, good enough for 10th place.

Mattatall later joined the Kay Zinck team as third, winning another provincial title in 2005. The team would finish with a 5–6 record, in 8th place. Mattatall would be invited to be the alternate player for Nova Scotia (skipped by Jill Mouzar) at the 2007 Scotties Tournament of Hearts. She would play in two matches. The team finished in 10th.

In 2015, Mattatall would switch to skipping again, and at the age of 56, her seniors team of Margaret Cutcliffe, Jill Alcoe-Holland and Andrea Saulnier won a surprise victory at the 2017 Nova Scotia Scotties Tournament of Hearts, sending them to the 2017 Scotties Tournament of Hearts. That same year, Mattatall and her team would win the provincial women's seniors title, and will represent Nova Scotia at the 2017 Canadian Senior Curling Championships.

On the World Curling Tour, Mattatall has won two tour events, the 2004 Sobeys Curling Classic (playing third for Zinck) and the 2015 Lady Monctonian Invitational Spiel.

=== Coaching ===
Mattatall has coached the Nova Scotia junior women's curling team skipped by Taylour Stevens since 2019. The team represented Canada at the World Junior Curling Championship 2023 in Fussen Germany.

== Personal life ==
As of 2017, she worked as a manager with Public Services and Procurement Canada. She has since retired.
