= 1992 Canadian Mixed Curling Championship =

- Host city: Grande Prairie Alberta
- Arena: Grande Prairie Curling Club
- Dates: March 14–21, 1992
- Attendance: 5,300
- Winner: Alberta
- Curling club: Grande Prairie Curling Club
- Skip: Kurt Balderston
- Third: Marcy Balderston
- Second: Rod Kramer
- Lead: Joanne Morrison
- Alternate: Susan Morrison
- Finalist: Northern Ontario

The 1992 Canadian Mixed Curling Championship was held March 14 to 21, 1992 at the Grande Prairie Curling Club in Grande Prairie, Alberta.

Alberta, represented by the hometown Grande Prairie rink of Kurt Balderston, his wife Marcy, and front end of Rod Kramer and sister Joanne Morrison won the event, defeating Team Northern Ontario, skipped by Jim Adams in the final, 4–3 in an extra end. For Balderston, it was a weight off his shoulders, as he had lost ten provincial finals in the previous ten years (excluding the provincial mixed championship he won to qualify). Both women on the team were pregnant, Marcy seven months, and Morrison four.

In the final, Northern Ontario began the scoring by stealing a point in the second end. Alberta tied the game in the third, and stole a point of their own in the fourth to take a 2–1 lead. After the two teams exchanged points in the sixth and seventh ends, Adams had a chance to win the game in the tenth after Balderston missed a takeout. Adams needed a draw to the four-foot to score two, but came up a foot short. He did score one to tie the game, sending it to an extra end. In the extra, Adams' last shot sailed through the house, allowing Balderston an easy draw for one to win the game. Balderston drew to the button, claiming the championship in front of 702 fans. Both teams curled 74 per cent. For Marcy Balderston, who was also suffering from a sore back the whole week, it was her second national curling championship, after having won the 1987 Scott Tournament of Hearts.

== Standings ==
Final standings

Key
Teams to Playoffs
Teams to Tiebreaker

Province	Skip	Wins	Losses
Alberta	Kurt Balderston	8	3
Northern Ontario	Jim Adams	7	4
British Columbia	Alan Roemer	7	4
Nova Scotia	Alan Darragh	7	4
Saskatchewan	Brian McCusker	6	5
Prince Edward Island	John Likely	6	5
Manitoba	Bill North	6	5
Newfoundland	Frank O'Driscoll	5	6
Ontario	Bob Turcotte	5	6
New Brunswick	Jim Sullivan	4	7
Quebec	Pierre Charette	3	8
Northwest Territories/Yukon	Klaus Schoenne	2	7

== Tiebreaker ==
March 20, 1:00pm

Team	1	2	3	4	5	6	7	8	9	10	Final
British Columbia (Roemer)	0	3	0	1	0	2	0	2	0	X	8
Nova Scotia (Darragh)	0	0	2	0	1	0	1	0	1	X	5

== Playoffs ==
Semifinal			Final
			1	Alberta	4
2	Northern Ontario	7	2	Northern Ontario	3
3	British Columbia	6

=== Semifinal ===
March 20, 8:00pm

Team	1	2	3	4	5	6	7	8	9	10	11	Final
Northern Ontario (Adams)	0	0	1	0	0	1	0	4	0	0	1	7
British Columbia (Roemer)	0	0	0	1	0	0	2	0	0	3	0	6

=== Final ===
March 21, 2:00pm

Team	1	2	3	4	5	6	7	8	9	10	11	Final
Northern Ontario (Adams)	0	1	0	0	0	1	0	0	0	1	0	3
Alberta (Balderston) 🔨	0	0	1	1	0	0	1	0	0	0	1	4

== Awards ==
=== All-star team ===
The event's all-star team was as follows:

- Skip: (Alberta) Kurt Balderston
- Third: (Northern Ontario) Diane Adams
- Second: (British Columbia) Mark Knutson
- Lead: (Northern Ontario) Diane Hogue

=== Sportsmanship ===
Ontario second Dick Howson won the sportsmanship award.
