= 2005 Canadian Mixed Curling Championship =

- Host city: Prince Albert, Saskatchewan
- Arena: Prince Albert Golf and Country Club
- Dates: November 21–28, 2004
- Winner: Newfoundland and Labrador
- Curling club: St. John's CC, St. John's, Newfoundland and Labrador
- Skip: Mark Nichols
- Third: Shelley Nichols
- Second: Brent Hamilton
- Lead: Jennifer Guzzwell
- Finalist: Saskatchewan (Kyle George)

The 2005 Canadian Mixed Curling Championship was held November 21–28, 2004 at the Prince Albert Golf and Country Club in Prince Albert, Saskatchewan.

The 2005 Mixed was the 2nd Canadian Mixed Championship to be held in the 2004 calendar year, as the Canadian Curling Association moved the event from the Spring to the Fall. The Mixed has been held in the Fall ever since, and has been referred to the following calendar year ever since. The event also changed playoff formats, moving from the page playoff system to a 3-team playoff.

Newfoundland and Labrador won its first ever Mixed championship, as Mark Nichols, sister Shelley Nichols, Brent Hamilton and Jennifer Guzzwell from the St. John's Curling Club won the championship, defeating Saskatchewan in the final.

== Teams ==
Locale	Skip	Third	Second	Lead
Alberta	Ralph Brust	Karen Powell (skip)	Ken Powell	Tina McDonald
British Columbia	Scott DeCap	Kristen Windsor	Brian Windsor	Lanette Nordick
Manitoba	Terry McNamee	Tasha Hunter	Brendan Taylor	Tanya Robins
New Brunswick	Terry Odishaw	Becky Atkinson	Kevin Boyle	Jane Boyle
Newfoundland and Labrador	Mark Nichols	Shelley Nichols	Brent Hamilton	Jennifer Guzzwell
Northern Ontario	Joe Scharf	Krista Scharf	Mike McCarville	Amy Stachiw
Nova Scotia	Paul Flemming	Melanie Comstock	Alan Cameron	Hayley Clarke
Ontario	Phil Daniel	Kerry Lackie	Spencer Townley	Kim Ambrose
Prince Edward Island	Kim Dolan	Kevin Champion	Marion MacAulay	Mike Dillon
Quebec	Ève Bélisle	Mark McClory	Martine Comeau	Christian Bouchard
Saskatchewan	Kyle George	Jolene McIvor	Ben Hebert	Maegan Strueby
Northwest Territories/Yukon	Jamie Koe	Monique Gagnier	Brad Chorostkowski	Kelly Kaylo

== Standings ==
Province	Skip	Wins	Losses
Saskatchewan	Kyle George	8	3
Newfoundland and Labrador	Mark Nichols	8	3
British Columbia	Scott DeCap	7	4
Nova Scotia	Paul Flemming	7	4
New Brunswick	Terry Odishaw	6	5
Manitoba	Terry McNamee	6	5
Ontario	Phil Daniel	6	5
Northern Ontario	Joe Scharf	5	6
Quebec	Ève Bélisle	4	7
Northwest Territories/Yukon	Jamie Koe	3	8
Alberta	Ralph Brust	3	8
Prince Edward Island	Kim Dolan	3	8

== Tiebreaker ==
- Nova Scotia 8-4 British Columbia

== Playoffs ==
Semifinal			Final
			1	Saskatchewan	5
2	Newfoundland and Labrador	9	2	Newfoundland and Labrador	7
3	Nova Scotia	7
