= Kurt Balderston =

Canadian curler

Personal information
- Born: Grande Prairie, Alberta, Canada

Kurt Balderston (born c. 1963) is a Canadian curler from Sexsmith, Alberta.

== Career ==
Balderston is a former Canadian Mixed champion, having won the 1992 Canadian Mixed Curling Championship. Since then he has played in four national mixed championships, in 1998, 2001, 2012 and 2013. He finished as the runner-up in 2012 and in sixth place in 2013, when Cheryl Bernard replaced his regular third Desirée Owen. Balderston won a sixth provincial mixed title in 2018 and will represent Alberta at the 2019 Canadian Mixed Curling Championship.

Balderston has also competed in the Alberta curling provincials multiple times. His best finishes were as the runner-up in 1991, 1992, 2002, and 2004. He was third for Mike Vavrek in 1991 and 1992, when he lost both finals to Kevin Martin, and skipped his own team in 2004 when he lost to Randy Ferbey. He made his final appearance at the Alberta provincials as a skip in 2013. He returned in 2014, playing third for Mark Johnson. That same year, the Johnson rink (with Balderston throwing third) won the Alberta Senior Curling Championship. The team represented Alberta at the 2014 Canadian Senior Curling Championships, where they finished fourth.

Balderston played in his first career Grand Slam event at the 2018 Humpty's Champions Cup, which he qualified for by winning the Original 16 WCT Bonspiel.

== Personal life ==
As of 2004, he was employed as a farmer.
