= Kevin Pendergast =

American football and soccer player

No. 12
- Position: Kicker

Career information
- High school: Simsbury High School
- College: University of Notre Dame (1991–1994)

Kevin Pendergast is an American former football and soccer player. He was the most valuable player for the Notre Dame soccer team before Coach Lou Holtz recruited him to play for the football team as a placekicker. In 1998, he pleaded guilty to conspiring with players from Northwestern University's basketball team to engage in point shaving in three games.

== College career ==
He was a star soccer player at Simsbury High School in Simsbury, Connecticut and Notre Dame recruited him for its soccer program. In 1989 and 1990, he was the team's leading scorer. In 1991, the football team's starting placekicker, Craig Hentrich, sprained his knee and Head Coach Lou Holtz looked to the soccer team for a kicker to handle kickoffs. Pendergast has never played organized football, but joined the team as a walk-on.

In the 1992 Sugar Bowl against Florida, Hentrich again suffered an injury forcing Pendergast to attempt his first field goal in a competitive game. He made the field goal, and later kicked three extra points and another field goal as Notre Dame won 39–28.

With Hentrich healthy, returned to kickoff duty in the 1992–1993 season, but had his opportunity to start the following year. He was the team's leading scorer, converting 14 of 19 field goal attempts and kicked the go-ahead field goal in the 1994 Cotton Bowl Classic as Notre Dame defeated Texas A&M 24–21.

== Gambling involvement ==
In college, Pendergast began betting on sports, sometimes wagering $500 to $1,000 over a weekend. He also began gambling at a nearby riverboat casino, betting $25 to $50 a hand. After he graduated, he turned down opportunities to try out for professional football and moved to Chicago to try and start a rock band. There, he accumulated $20,000 in gambling debt, financing his gambling with credit cards.

In 1995, he learned that Kenneth Dion Lee, a Northwestern basketball player who had been the team's best three-point shooter, had received threats from a bookmaker over his own gambling debts. He convinced Lee, Dewey Williams and Matt Purdy to shave points in upcoming Wildcats games. Lee served a six-game suspension for betting on college sports, while Purdy, also a Northwestern football player, was accused of intentionally fumbling the football as a result of his own gambling debts. Pendergast agreed to pay Lee $4,000 for their successful bet in one game and doubled his offer to $8,000 for the following game.

The players were to ensure that the team failed to cover the point spread in several upcoming games. Because Northwestern would not be favored by oddsmakers, the team would have to lose by a larger margin than the posted spread. Pendergast would bet against Northwestern in the games. The scheme was only successful once, with Northwestern equaling the spread against Wisconsin resulting in little to no payout and unexpectedly covering the spread against Michigan costing him $20,150 and ending the scheme. His one successful wager was against Penn State, where he won $10,000. The game against Michigan was particularly tough as he had bet that Northwestern would fail to cover a 25 1/2-point spread and ended up losing by only 17 points. In total, via an associate, he made bets of $40,000 to $70,000.

The Federal government began an investigation of Lee and Purdy after Northwestern suspended him for his prior gambling and forwarded the results to the US Attorney. In 1998, the government charged five people, including Pendergast, Lee and Williams over their activities. Pendergast pleaded guilty to the charges and was sentenced to two months in prison while Lee and Williams received one-month sentences. The judge considered that Pendergast and Lee cooperated and were already giving speeches to student-athletes over the dangers of gambling.

== Personal ==
After his release from prison, former Notre Dame player Peter Schivarelli, who was a manager for the band Chicago offered Pendergast a job as assistant manager for the band. As of 2018, Pendergast is a registered nurse and continues to speak about his activities and his recovery from gambling addiction.
