= 2002 Ontario Nokia Cup =

- Host city: Belleville, Ontario
- Arena: Quinte Sports Centre
- Dates: January 28-February 3
- Winner: Team Morris
- Curling club: Stayner Granite Club, Clearview, Ontario
- Skip: John Morris
- Third: Joe Frans
- Second: Craig Savill
- Lead: Brent Laing
- Finalist: Phil Daniel

The 2002 Nokia Cup, southern Ontario men's provincial curling championship was held January 28-February 3 at the Quinte Sports Centre in Belleville, Ontario. The winning John Morris from Stayner would represent Ontario at the 2002 Nokia Brier in Calgary, Alberta.

Top teams in the province such as Wayne Middaugh, Glenn Howard and Rich Moffatt did not attempt to qualify for the event, after having signed a deal with the Grand Slam of Curling promising not to enter non-World Curling Tour events.

== Teams ==
| Skip | Third | Second | Lead |
|---|---|---|---|
| Greg Balsdon | Don Bowser | Darryl Prebble | Robert Dickson |
| John Base | Jason Boyce | Andy Ormsby | Trevor Wall |
| Richard Chorkawy | Gary Stanhope | Rob Gregg | Rob Biehler |
| Bryan Cochrane | Doug Johnston | Ian MacAulay | John Steski |
| Phil Daniel | Kevin Daniel | Pete Dekoning | Chris Lumbard |
| Bill Hope | Jason Hope | Scott Buckley | Tom Allore |
| Craig Kochan | Ian Robertson | Bob Leclair | Ken McDermot |
| Heath McCormick | Pat Ferris | Shaun Harris | Jake Higgs |
| Mark McDonald | Louis Phillips | Lloyd Emmerson | Cory Westwood |
| John Morris | Joe Frans | Craig Savill | Brent Laing |

== Standings ==
| Skip | Club | Wins | Losses |
|---|---|---|---|
| John Morris | Stayner Granite Club | 8 | 1 |
| Phil Daniel | Curling Club of Kingsville | 6 | 3 |
| Craig Kochan | Thornhill Country Club | 6 | 3 |
| Greg Balsdon | Weston Golf and Country Club | 5 | 4 |
| John Base | Meaford Curling Club | 4 | 5 |
| Richard Chorkawy | Burlington Curling Club | 4 | 5 |
| Heath McCormick | Exeter Curling Club | 4 | 5 |
| Bryan Cochrane | Ottawa Curling Club | 3 | 6 |
| Bill Hope | Trenton Curling Club | 3 | 6 |
| Mark McDonald | Gananoque Curling Club | 2 | 7 |

== Playoffs ==
Page playoff system
1 | John Morris | 6
2 | Phil Daniel | 4
3 | Craig Kochan | 9
4 | Greg Balsdon | 4

Semifinal
2 | Phil Daniel | 8
3 | Craig Kochan | 7

Final
1 | John Morris | 7
2 | Phil Daniel | 4

== Sources ==
- Nokia Cup - Coverage on curlingzone.com
- Ontario Curling Association: 2002 Nokia Cup - Internet Archive
