= 2007 TSC Stores Tankard =

- Host city: Sarnia, Ontario
- Arena: Sarnia Sports and Entertainment Centre
- Dates: February 12-18
- Winner: Team Howard
- Curling club: Coldwater & District CC, Coldwater
- Skip: Glenn Howard
- Third: Richard Hart
- Second: Brent Laing
- Lead: Craig Savill
- Finalist: Wayne Middaugh

The 2007 TSC Stores Tankard was held February 12–18 at the Sarnia Sports and Entertainment Centre in Sarnia.

== Qualification ==
Qualification method	Berths	Qualifying team(s)
Region 1	2	Bryan Cochrane; Damien Villard
Region 2	2	Wayne Middaugh; Wayne Warren
Region 3	2	Glenn Howard; Greg Balsdon
Region 4	2	Jim Lyle; Bob Stafford
Challenge Round East	1	John Epping
Challenge Round West	1	Heath McCormick

== Teams ==
Skip	Third	Second	Lead
Greg Balsdon	Adam Spencer	Don Bowser	Jason Boyce
Bryan Cochrane	Chris Fulton	Jeff Henderson	John Steski
John Epping	Nick Rizzo	Scott Foster	Ken McDermott
Glenn Howard	Richard Hart	Brent Laing	Craig Savill
Jim Lyle	Kevin Breivik	Ken Baute	Ted Smith
Heath McCormick	Jason Young	Shaun Harris	Mark Bice
Wayne Middaugh	Peter Corner	Ian Tetley	Scott Bailey
Robert Stafford	Ben Curtis	Mark Patterson	Scott Thompson
Damien Villard	Brian Chick	Derek Visutski	Scott Drinkwater
Wayne Warren	Jason March	Scott Borland	Mike Aprile

== Standings ==
Skip	Club	Wins	Losses
Glenn Howard	Coldwater and District Curling Club	9	0
Wayne Middaugh	St. George's Golf and Country Club	7	2
Greg Balsdon	Guelph Curling Club	6	3
John Epping	Omemee Curling Club	6	3
Heath McCormick	Sarnia Golf and Curling Club	5	4
Damien Villard	Renfrew Curling Club	4	5
Jim Lyle	St. Thomas Curling Club	4	5
Bryan Cochrane	RCMP Curling Club	2	7
Robert Stafford	Chatham Granite Club	1	8
Wayne Warren	Cannington Curling Club	1	8

== Playoffs ==
Page playoff system
1	Glenn Howard	9
2	Wayne Middaugh	2
3	Greg Balsdon	8
4	John Epping	12

Semifinal
2	Wayne Middaugh	9
4	John Epping	5

Final
1	Glenn Howard	9
2	Wayne Middaugh	5

== Sources ==
- 2007 TSC Stores Tankard Coverage on CurlingZone.com
