= 2005 Ontario Kia Cup =

- Host city: Whitby, Ontario
- Arena: Iroquois Park Sports Centre
- Dates: February 6-13
- Winner: Team Middaugh
- Curling club: St. George's Golf and Country Club, Toronto, Ontario
- Skip: Wayne Middaugh
- Third: Graeme McCarrel
- Second: Joe Frans
- Lead: Scott Bailey
- Finalist: Glenn Howard

The 2005 Kia Cup, southern Ontario men's provincial curling championship was held February 6–13 at the Iroquois Park Sports Centre in Whitby, Ontario. The winning team of Wayne Middaugh would represent Ontario at the 2005 Tim Hortons Brier in Edmonton, Alberta.

== Qualification ==
Qualification method	Berths	Qualifying team(s)
Region 1	2	Brian Lewis; Josh Adams
Region 2	2	Wayne Middaugh; Nick Rizzo
Region 3	2	Glenn Howard; Andrew Fairfull
Region 4	2	Kirk Ziola; Peter Corner
Challenge Round East	1	Bryan Cochrane
Challenge Round West	1	Greg Balsdon

== Teams ==
Skip	Third	Second	Lead
Josh Adams	Spencer Cooper	Brian Vance	Paul Wood
Greg Balsdon	Adam Spencer	Don Bowser	Robert Dickson
Bryan Cochrane	Bill Gamble	Ian MacAulay	John Steski
Peter Corner	Craig Kochan	Ian Robertson	Ken McDermot
Andrew Fairfull	Scott Hodgson	Eric Gibson	Mark Gamble
Glenn Howard	Richard Hart	Brent Laing	Craig Savill
Brian Lewis	Willie Jeffries	Mark Rodgers	Jeff Norman
Wayne Middaugh	Graeme McCarrel	Joe Frans	Scott Bailey
Nick Rizzo	John Epping	Scott Foster	Rob Brockbank
Kirk Ziola	Darcy Tomchick	Mark Koivula	Steve Lodge

== Standings ==
Skip	Club	Wins	Losses
Wayne Middaugh	St. George's Golf and Country Club	8	1
Glenn Howard	Coldwater and District Curling Club	7	2
Peter Corner	Glanford Curling Club	6	3
Greg Balsdon	Guelph Country Club	6	3
Nick Rizzo	Omemee Curling Club	5	4
Brian Lewis	Huntley Curling Club	4	5
Bryan Cochrane	RCMP Curling Club	4	5
Kirk Ziola	Ilderton Curling Club	3	6
Josh Adams	Granite Curling Club of West Ottawa	1	8
Andrew Fairfull	Guelph Curling Club	1	8

== Playoffs ==
Page playoff system
1	Wayne Middaugh	5
2	Glenn Howard	6
3	Peter Corner	8
4	Greg Balsdon	4

Semifinal
1	Wayne Middaugh	9
3	Peter Corner	4

Final
2	Glenn Howard	7
1	Wayne Middaugh	8

== Sources ==
- Kia Cup - Coverage on curlingzone.com
