= Brent Laing =

Canadian curler (born 1978)

- Curler
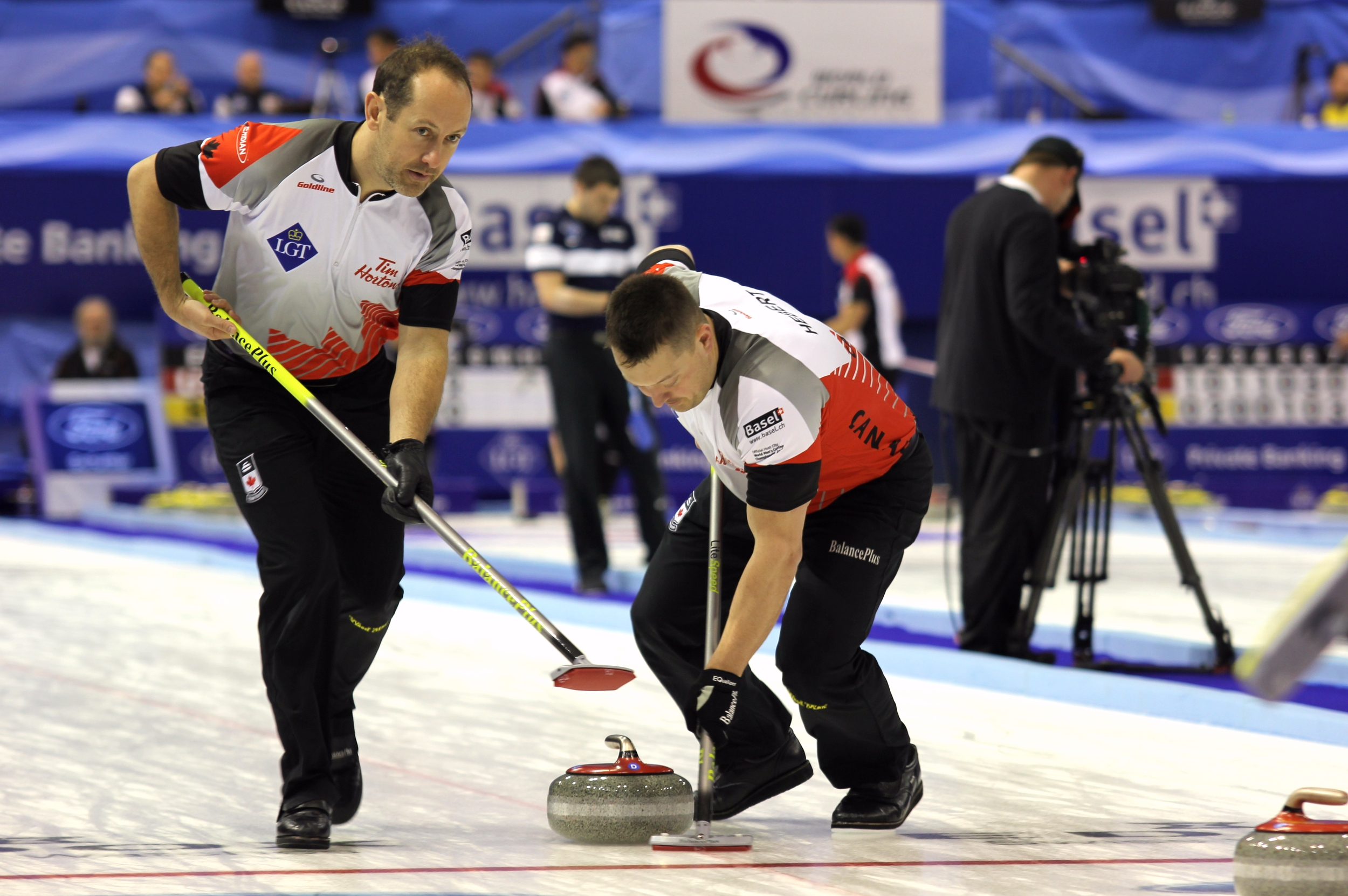
- Laing (left) and Ben Hebert at the 2016 World Men's Curling Championship
- Born: December 10, 1978 (age 47); Meaford, Ontario, Canada

Team
- Curling club: Royals, Toronto, ON; Barrie CC; Barrie, ON
- Mixed doubles partner: Jennifer Jones

Curling career
- Member Association: Ontario (1997–2014; 2018–present); Alberta (2014–2018); Saskatchewan (2025)
- Brier: 17 (2002, 2006, 2007, 2008, 2009, 2010, 2011, 2012, 2013, 2015, 2016, 2017, 2020, 2021, 2023, 2025, 2026)
- World Championship: 3 (2007, 2012, 2016)
- World Mixed Doubles Championship: 1 (2023)
- Olympic: 1 (2018)
- Top CTRS ranking: 1st (2008–09, 2015–16)
- Grand Slam victories: 16: World Cup/Masters (Dec 2006, Jan 2008, Nov 2008, 2009, 2011, 2013, 2018); Players (2008, 2013, 2018); Canadian Open (2009, 2012); The National (Dec. 2007, 2012, 2014); Tour Challenge (2015)
Medal record
World Curling Championships
Gold medal – first place	2007 Edmonton
Gold medal – first place	2012 Basel
Gold medal – first place	2016 Basel
Canadian Olympic Curling Trials
Gold medal – first place	2017 Ottawa
Silver medal – second place	2009 Edmonton
Bronze medal – third place	2025 Halifax
Tim Hortons Brier
Gold medal – first place	2007 Hamilton
Gold medal – first place	2012 Saskatoon
Gold medal – first place	2016 Ottawa
Silver medal – second place	2002 Calgary
Silver medal – second place	2006 Regina
Silver medal – second place	2008 Winnipeg
Silver medal – second place	2010 Halifax
Silver medal – second place	2011 London
Silver medal – second place	2017 St. John's
Bronze medal – third place	2009 Calgary
Bronze medal – third place	2013 Edmonton
Canadian Mixed Doubles Championship
Gold medal – first place	2023 Sudbury
Bronze medal – third place	2017 Saskatoon
World Junior Curling Championships
Gold medal – first place	1998 Thunder Bay
Gold medal – first place	1999 Östersund

Brent George Laing (born December 10, 1978) is a Canadian curler from Barrie, Ontario. He grew up in Meaford, Ontario.

== Career ==
Curling out of the Ottawa Curling Club (in Ottawa) and later the Stayner Curling Club (in Stayner, Ontario), Laing played lead for John Morris until Morris left for Alberta in 2003. With Morris, Laing won the 1998 and 1999 Canadian Junior Curling Championships as well as the 1998 and 1999 World Junior Curling Championships. The team played in the 2001 Canadian Olympic Curling Trials, but missed the playoffs after finishing with a 5-4 record. In 2002, they made it all the way to the Brier final, losing to Alberta's Randy Ferbey.

In 2004, Laing joined the Glenn Howard rink, playing second for the team. The team played in the 2005 Canadian Olympic Curling Trials, but missed the playoffs, finishing with a 5-4 record. Later that season, they lost in the final of the 2006 Tim Hortons Brier to Jean-Michel Ménard from Quebec. The following year, they won the 2007 Tim Hortons Brier (defeating Newfoundland and Labrador's Brad Gushue rink in the final) and then the 2007 Ford World Men's Curling Championship, where they defeated Germany's Andy Kapp rink in the final. The team lost in the 2008 Tim Hortons Brier final to Kevin Martin of Alberta, and at the 2009 Tim Hortons Brier, they lost in the semifinal Jeff Stoughton's Manitoba rink. The next season, the team would make it all the way to the finals of the 2009 Canadian Olympic Curling Trials, where they lost to Kevin Martin. At the 2010 Tim Hortons Brier, the team lost in the final once again, this time to Kevin Koe of Alberta. The team lost their second straight Brier final in 2011, losing to Stoughton again. The team won the 2012 Tim Hortons Brier, defeating Koe in the final. The team won the 2012 World Men's Curling Championship as Team Canada, claiming the gold medal, after defeating Scotland's Tom Brewster in the final. The team won the bronze medal at the 2013 Tim Hortons Brier, defeating Brad Gushue of Newfoundland and Labrador in the bronze medal game. The team played in the 2013 Canadian Olympic Curling Trials, but missed the playoffs, finishing with a 2-5 record. The team did not make it to the 2014 Brier, losing in the Ontario final to Greg Balsdon. At the end of the season, Laing left the rink to join Koe's Alberta team as his second.

The new Koe team represented Alberta at the 2015 Tim Hortons Brier, but missed the playoffs, going 6-5 in the round robin. The team had more success at the 2016 Tim Hortons Brier, which they won, by defeating Newfoundland and Labrador (Gushue) in the final. The team represented Canada at the 2016 World Men's Curling Championship, where they won the gold medal, defeating Denmark's Rasmus Stjerne in the final. The team represented Team Canada at the 2017 Tim Hortons Brier, but lost to Gushue in the final in a re-match of the previous Brier. The following season, the team won the 2017 Canadian Olympic Curling Trials, and represented Canada at the 2018 Winter Olympics, but fell short of the podium after losing in the bronze medal game to Switzerland's Peter de Cruz rink. Later that season, it was announced that Laing would return to playing out of his home province of Ontario, and would join the John Epping rink as his second. In his first season as a member of the Epping rink, the team lost in the 2019 Tim Hortons Brier Wild Card game.

Ryan Fry joined the Epping team at third for the 2019–20 season, with Camm and Laing moving to second and lead and Savill leaving the team. They had a strong start to the year, winning both the Stu Sells Oakville Tankard and the 2019 AMJ Campbell Shorty Jenkins Classic. They had a semifinal finish at the Masters, the first Grand Slam of the season. They missed the playoffs at the next two slams, the Tour Challenge and the National after going 1–3 at both. Team Epping posted a 6–2 record en route to winning the 2019 Canada Cup in Leduc, Alberta. This win qualified them to represent Team Canada along with five other Canadian teams at the 2020 Continental Cup where they lost 22.5–37.5 to the Europeans. They had a strong showing at the Canadian Open where they made it all the way to the final where they lost to the Brad Jacobs rink. At the 2020 Ontario Tankard, they completed their undefeated run throughout the week with an 8–3 win over Glenn Howard. Representing Ontario at the 2020 Tim Hortons Brier, they finished the championship pool with a 7–4 record and in a four way tie for fourth place. They defeated Team Wild Card (Mike McEwen) in the first tiebreaker before losing to Northern Ontario (Brad Jacobs) in the second and being eliminated from contention. It would be the team's last event of the season as both the Players' Championship and the Champions Cup Grand Slam events were cancelled due to the COVID-19 pandemic.

Team Epping began the 2020–21 season with a win at the 2020 Stu Sells Toronto Tankard. The 2021 Ontario provincial playdowns were cancelled due to the COVID-19 pandemic in Ontario. As the 2020 provincial champions, Team Epping was chosen to represent Ontario at the 2021 Tim Hortons Brier in Calgary. At the Brier, they finished with a 7–5 record.

The following season, Team Epping played in the 2021 Canadian Olympic Curling Trials, where they missed the playoffs with a 3–5 record. The team re-bounded a month later by winning the ATB Banff Classic. The team played in the 2022 Ontario Tankard, but lost in the final to Team Howard, skipped by Scott Howard. Following the season, the Epping rink broke up with Laing and Fry joining a new team led by Mike McEwen.

Laing played one season with the McEwen rink. The team managed to win the 2023 Ontario Tankard, and represented Ontario at the 2023 Tim Hortons Brier, where they lost in the 3 vs. 4 page playoff game. The team would only play one season together, with McEwen forming a new team out of Saskatchewan. In mixed doubles curling, Laing and wife Jennifer Jones won the 2023 Canadian Mixed Doubles Curling Championship. The pair went on to represent Canada at the 2023 World Mixed Doubles Curling Championship, where they placed fourth, after losing the bronze medal game to Norway.

On the World Curling Tour, Laing has won a career 16 Grand Slams, 13 with the Howard rink. He won the 2015 GSOC Tour Challenge and the 2018 Players' Championship with Koe, and the 2018 Masters with Epping.

== Personal life ==
On June 1, 2015, Laing married another champion curler, Jennifer Jones from Manitoba. They have two children together, Isabella and Skyla. Laing also has a son, Wil, from a previous relationship. Laing took over his family’s business, a Weedman franchise in Barrie and Collingwood, Ontario.

== Teams ==
Season	Skip	Third	Second	Lead	Events
1996–97	Andy Ormsby	Brent Laing	Wade Walsh	Jeff Gorda	
1997–98	John Morris	Craig Savill	Andy Ormsby	Brent Laing	1998 CJC, WJC
1998–99	John Morris	Craig Savill	Jason Young	Brent Laing	1999 CJC, WJC
1999–00	John Morris	Craig Savill	Andy Ormsby	Brent Laing	
2000–01	John Morris	Joe Frans	Craig Savill	Brent Laing	2001 Ont.
2001–02	John Morris	Joe Frans	Craig Savill	Brent Laing	2001 COCT, 2002 Ont., Brier
2002–03	John Morris	Joe Frans	Craig Savill	Brent Laing	2003 Ont., CC
2003–04	Heath McCormick	Brent Laing	Jason Young	Shaun Harris	
2004–05	Glenn Howard	Richard Hart	Brent Laing	Craig Savill	2005 Ont.
2005–06	Glenn Howard	Richard Hart	Brent Laing	Craig Savill	2005 COCT, 2006 CC, Ont., Brier
2006–07	Glenn Howard	Richard Hart	Brent Laing	Craig Savill	2007 Ont., Brier, WCC
2007–08	Glenn Howard	Richard Hart	Brent Laing	Craig Savill	2008 Ont., CC, Brier
2008–09	Glenn Howard	Richard Hart	Brent Laing	Craig Savill	2009 Ont., Brier
2009–10	Glenn Howard	Richard Hart	Brent Laing	Craig Savill	2009 COCT, 2010 Ont., Brier
2010–11	Glenn Howard	Richard Hart	Brent Laing	Craig Savill	2010 CC, 2011 2011, Brier
2011–12	Glenn Howard	Wayne Middaugh	Brent Laing	Craig Savill	2011 CC, 2012 Ont., Brier, WCC
2012–13	Glenn Howard	Wayne Middaugh	Brent Laing	Craig Savill	2012 CC, 2013 Ont., Brier
2013–14	Glenn Howard	Wayne Middaugh	Brent Laing	Craig Savill	2013 COCT, 2014 Ont.
2014–15	Kevin Koe	Marc Kennedy	Brent Laing	Ben Hebert	2014 CC, 2015 Alta., Brier
2015–16	Kevin Koe	Marc Kennedy	Brent Laing	Ben Hebert	2015 CC, 2016 Alta., Brier, WCC
2016–17	Kevin Koe	Marc Kennedy	Brent Laing	Ben Hebert	2016 CC, 2017 Brier
2017–18	Kevin Koe	Marc Kennedy	Brent Laing	Ben Hebert	2017 COCT, 2018 2018 OG
2018–19	John Epping	Mat Camm	Brent Laing	Craig Savill	2018 CC, 2019 Ont., Brier WC
2019–20	John Epping	Ryan Fry	Mat Camm	Brent Laing	2019 CC, 2020 Ont., Brier
2020–21	John Epping	Ryan Fry	Mat Camm	Brent Laing	2021 Brier
2021–22	John Epping	Ryan Fry	Mat Camm	Brent Laing	2021 COCT, 2022 Ont.
2022–23	Mike McEwen	Ryan Fry	Jonathan Beuk; Joey Hart	Brent Laing	2022 PBI, 2023 Ont., Brier
