= Adam Spencer (curler) =

Canadian curler (born 1972)

- Curler
- Born: July 11, 1972 (age 54); Guelph, Ontario

Team
- Curling club: Guelph CC, Guelph, ON

Curling career
- Member Association: Ontario
- Brier: 3 (2016, 2017, 2022)

Adam Spencer, nicknamed "Crusher" (born July 11, 1972) is a Canadian curler from Guelph, Ontario.

== Career ==
=== Juniors ===
In 1992, Spencer skipped a team consisting of Greg Robinson, Jeff Robinson and Nolan Sims to a provincial junior title. This qualified the rink to represent Ontario at the 1992 Canadian Junior Curling Championships. There, he led his Ontario rink to a 6-5 round robin record. This put them in a three-way tie for third place. They would go on to lose their tie breaker match against Saskatchewan's Scott Bitz.

=== Men's ===
After juniors, Spencer won a provincial Colts championship in 1994. He would be a skip for much of his early men's career, including going to his first Provincial championship in 1996, where he led his team to a 5–4 record and his second in 2003, where he led his team to a 1-8 record. The next season, he joined the Greg Balsdon rink playing third for the team. They would play in two provincial championships together: 2005 (6-3; lost in 3 vs. 4 game) and 2007 (6-3; lost in 3 vs. 4 game).

Spencer left the Balsdon rink in 2009, joining up with Joe Frans as his third. The team played in the 2010 Ontario Men's Curling Championship, where they went 6-4, missing the playoffs. After the season, the team added Wayne Middaugh as skip, with Spencer becoming the alternate. Spencer played in one event with the team, playing in his first Grand Slam, the 2011 BDO Canadian Open, missing the playoffs. After the season, Spencer joined the Robert Rumfeldt rink, as his third.

In the 2012-13 season, the team would play in three Grand Slam events, missing the playoffs in each event. The team qualified for the 2013 provincial championship, finishing the round robin with a 7-3 record. However in the 3 vs. 4 game, they would lose to John Epping. The next season they played in just one Grand Slam event, the 2013 Canadian Open of Curling, where they would lose in the quarter finals. They would also play in the 2013 Olympic Curling Trials Qualifying Tournament, where they lost all three matches. The team played in the 2014 provincial championship, going 5-5. The 2014-15 season would be the last for Spencer with the Rumfeldt rink. The team played in just one Slam, missing the playoffs. Playing in the 2015 Ontario Tankard, the team missed the playoffs for the second straight year, going 4-6.

In 2015, Spencer joined the Brent Ross rink as his third, and spared for Glenn Howard at the beginning of the season. He played with the Howard rink at the 2015 GSOC Tour Challenge, where they would lose in the quarterfinals. After the Ross team failed to make the 2016 Ontario Tankard, Spencer was added as a spare to Team Howard after their third, Wayne Middaugh suffered a skiing accident prior to the event. With Spencer, the Howard rink would go on to win the Tankard, qualifying the team to represent Ontario at the 2016 Tim Hortons Brier.

== Personal life ==
Spencer is a graduate of the Guelph Collegiate Vocational Institute and went to George Brown College. He is currently employed as a production manager with The Farley Group. He is married to Jen Spencer and has two children.

His great uncle Adam F. Spencer was lead for the 1947 Ontario Brier team.
