= Craig Savill =

Canadian curler

- Curler
- Born: October 25, 1978 (age 48); Lahr, West Germany

Team
- Curling club: Ottawa CC, Ottawa, ON
- Skip: Adam Casey
- Third: Craig Savill
- Second: Steve Burgess
- Lead: Robbie Doherty

Curling career
- Member Association: Ontario (1993–2016; 2018–2022); Alberta (2016–2017); Prince Edward Island (2022–present)
- Brier: 10 (2002, 2006, 2007, 2008, 2009, 2010, 2011, 2012, 2013, 2016)
- Top CTRS ranking: 1st (2008–09)
- Grand Slam victories: 13: World Cup/Masters (Dec 2006, Jan 2008, Nov 2008, 2009, 2011, 2013, 2018); Players (2008, 2013); Canadian Open (2009, 2012); The National (2012, 2014)
Medal record
Men's curling
Representing Canada
World Curling Championships
Gold medal – first place	2007 Edmonton
Gold medal – first place	2012 Basel
Canadian Olympic Curling Trials
Silver medal – second place	2009 Edmonton
Tim Hortons Brier
Gold medal – first place	2007 Hamilton
Gold medal – first place	2012 Saskatoon
Silver medal – second place	2002 Calgary
Silver medal – second place	2006 Regina
Silver medal – second place	2008 Winnipeg
Silver medal – second place	2010 Halifax
Silver medal – second place	2011 London
Bronze medal – third place	2009 Calgary
Bronze medal – third place	2013 Edmonton
World Junior Curling Championships
Gold medal – first place	1998 Thunder Bay
Gold medal – first place	1999 Östersund

Craig Edward Savill (born October 25, 1978) is a Canadian curler, originally from Manotick, Ontario, Canada. He currently plays third on Team Adam Casey. He also coaches the Czech men's national team.

== Career ==
Savill's father was stationed at CFB Lahr in Germany, and Savill was born there. However, Savill grew up in Ottawa. He curls out of the Ottawa Curling Club in club play. Before playing with Howard, Savill won two Canadian Junior Curling Championships and two World Junior Curling Championships (1998, 1999) as John Morris's third. In 2001, he moved to the position of second, still with John Morris. The team went to the 2002 Nokia Brier and lost in the final to Alberta, skipped by Randy Ferbey. A couple of years later, Morris moved to Alberta, and Savill joined Howard's team. With Howard, Savill, second Brent Laing, and third Richard Hart lost in the 2006 Tim Hortons Brier to Quebec, skipped by fellow Ottawa Curling Club member Jean-Michel Ménard. The following year, at the 2007 Tim Hortons Brier, they would finally be victorious, defeating 2006 Olympic gold medallist Brad Gushue in the Brier final. They then went on to win the 2007 Ford World Men's Curling Championship, defeating Germany in the final.

== Personal life ==
Savill is a financial advisor with Sun Life financial. He is married to Karen Cumberland and has two children. He was diagnosed with Hodgkin's lymphoma in late 2015, and as a result, he was forced to take a hiatus from curling. As a special tribute, Savill was allowed to throw two rocks in a game for former teammate Glenn Howard's Ontario rink at the 2016 Tim Hortons Brier in his hometown of Ottawa. He would make both shots perfectly.

He currently lives in Kensington, Prince Edward Island.

== Teams ==
Season	Skip	Third	Second	Lead	Alternate	Events
1993–94	John Morris	Mark Homan	Mike Lilly	Craig Savill	Damien Boland	
1996-97	John Morris	Craig Savill	Matt St. Louis	Mark Homan		1997 CJC
1997-98	John Morris	Craig Savill	Andy Ormsby	Brent Laing	Brad Gushue	1998 CJC, 1998 WJC
1998-99	John Morris	Craig Savill	Jason Young	Brent Laing	Andy Ormsby	1999 CJC, 1999 WJC
1999-00	John Morris	Craig Savill	Andy Ormsby	Brent Laing		
2000-01	John Morris	Joe Frans	Craig Savill	Brent Laing		2001 Ont.
2001-02	John Morris	Joe Frans	Craig Savill	Brent Laing	Chris Fulton & Jason Young	2001 COCT, 2002 Ont., 2002 Brier
2002-03	John Morris	Joe Frans	Craig Savill	Brent Laing		2003 Ont., 2003 CC
2003–04	Craig Savill	Josh Adams	Spencer Cooper	T.J. Connolly	Stephen Watson	
2004–05	Glenn Howard	Richard Hart	Brent Laing	Craig Savill		2005 Ont.
2005–06	Glenn Howard	Richard Hart	Brent Laing	Craig Savill	Wayne Middaugh & Scott Taylor	2005 COCT, 2006 CC, 2006 Ont., 2006 Brier
2006–07	Glenn Howard	Richard Hart	Brent Laing	Craig Savill	Steve Bice	2007 Ont., 2007 Brier, 2007 WCC
2007–08	Glenn Howard	Richard Hart	Brent Laing	Craig Savill	Steve Bice	2008 Ont., 2008 CC, 2008 Brier
2008–09	Glenn Howard	Richard Hart	Brent Laing	Craig Savill	Steve Bice	2009 Ont., 2009 Brier
2009–10	Glenn Howard	Richard Hart	Brent Laing	Craig Savill	Steve Bice	2009 COCT, 2010 Ont., 2010 Brier
2010–11	Glenn Howard	Richard Hart	Brent Laing	Craig Savill	Scott Howard	2010 CC, 2011 Ont., 2011 Brier
2011–12	Glenn Howard	Wayne Middaugh	Brent Laing	Craig Savill	Scott Howard	2011 CC, 2012 Ont., 2012 Brier, 2012 WCC
2012–13	Glenn Howard	Wayne Middaugh	Brent Laing	Craig Savill	Scott Howard	2012 CC, 2013 Ont., 2013 Brier
2013–14	Glenn Howard	Wayne Middaugh	Brent Laing	Craig Savill	Scott Howard	2013 COCT, 2014 Ont.
2014–15	Glenn Howard	Richard Hart	Jon Mead	Craig Savill		2014 CC
2015	Shawn Adams	Mark Dacey	Craig Savill	Andrew Gibson		2016 Brier (Note: As a special tribute, Savill was permitted to throw two rocks in Team Ontario's (skipped by Glenn Howard) final game. Savill had been forced to take time off from curling due to being diagnosed with cancer, but was allowed to play in the game.)
2016–17	Charley Thomas	Nathan Connolly	Brandon Klassen	Craig Savill		2017 Alta.
2017	Reid Carruthers	Braeden Moskowy	Derek Samagalski	Colin Hodgson	Craig Savill	2017 COCT
2018–19	John Epping	Mathew Camm	Brent Laing	Craig Savill		2018 CC, 2019 Ont., 2019 Brier WC
