= 2003 Ontario Nokia Cup =

- Host city: Mississauga, Ontario
- Arena: Hershey Centre
- Dates: January 25-February 2
- Winner: Team Cochrane
- Curling club: RCMP CC, Ottawa, Ontario
- Skip: Bryan Cochrane
- Third: Bill Gamble
- Second: Ian MacAulay
- Lead: John Steski
- Finalist: Peter Corner

The 2003 Ontario Nokia Cup, Southern Ontario's men's provincial curling championship, was held January 25-February 2 at the Hershey Centre in Mississauga.

Ottawa's Bryan Cochrane won his lone provincial championship of his career. His rink of Bill Gamble, Ian MacAulay, and John Steski would represent Ontario at the 2003 Nokia Brier.

The event was boycotted by the Wayne Middaugh and Glenn Howard rinks, who were still in a dispute with the Canadian Curling Association over receiving a share of Brier revenues.

== Teams ==
Skip	Third	Second	Lead
Bryan Cochrane	Bill Gamble	Ian MacAulay	John Steski
Peter Corner	Heath McCormick	Todd Brandwood	Shaun Harris
Phil Daniel	Kevin Daniel	Pete Dekoning	Chris Lumbard
Gary Grant	Scott Foster	Dan Balachorek	Jim Chilvers
Mike Harris	John Base	Phil Loevenmark	Trevor Wall
John Morris	Joe Frans	Craig Savill	Brent Laing
Howard Rajala	Paul Madden	Chris Fulton	Jeff Henderson
Brent Ross	Doug Gibson	Alex Faulkner	Wes Pike
Adam Spencer	Rob Rumfeldt	Greg Robinson	Tom Rudland
Greg Timbers	Barry Acton	Randy Grant	Chris David

== Standings ==
Skip	Club	Wins	Losses
Bryan Cochrane	RCMP Curling Club	8	1
John Morris	Stayner Granite Club	7	2
Mike Harris	Oakville Curling Club	6	3
Peter Corner	Glendale Golf and Country Club	5	4
Gary Grant	Uxbridge and District Curling Club	5	4
Phil Daniel	Curling Club of Kingsville	4	5
Howard Rajala	Rideau Curling Club	4	5
Greg Timbers	Uxbridge and District Curling Club	3	6
Brent Ross	Harriston Curling Club	2	7
Adam Spencer	Guelph Curling Club	1	8

== Tie-breaker ==
- Corner 9-3 Grant

== Playoffs ==
Page playoff system
1	Bryan Cochrane	6
2	John Morris	5
3	Mike Harris	5
4	Peter Corner	6

Semifinal
2	John Morris	5
4	Peter Corner	8

Final
1	Bryan Cochrane	11
4	Peter Corner	8
