= 1998 Canadian Junior Curling Championships =

The 1998 Kärcher Canadian Junior Curling Championships were held January 24-February 1 at the Calgary Curling Club and the North Hill Curling Club in Calgary, Alberta.

== Men's ==
=== Teams ===
| Province / Territory | Skip | Third | Second | Lead |
|---|---|---|---|---|
| Alberta | Carter Rycroft | Glen Kennedy | Marc Kennedy | Jason Lesmeister |
| British Columbia | Kevin Dey | Chris Morrison | Robert Gallaugher | Chris Cowan |
| Manitoba | Mike McEwen | David Chalmers | Bryce Granger | Kevin Schmidt |
| New Brunswick | Rob Heffernan | Patrice Robichaud | Ryan Cain | Kevin Tippett |
| Newfoundland | Brad Gushue | Ryan Davis | Jason Davidge | Brett Reynolds |
| Northern Ontario | Andrew Mikkelsen | Mark Koivula | Ben Mikkelsen | Brian Adams |
| Northwest Territories | Jamie Koe | Kevin Whitehead | Matt St. Louis | Kevin Cymbalisty |
| Nova Scotia | Peter Eddy | Hugh Fidler | John Friel | Andrew Gibson |
| Ontario | John Morris | Craig Savill | Andy Ormsby | Brent Laing |
| Prince Edward Island | Kyle Stevenson | Robbie Gauthier | Rodney Hood | Terry Hood |
| Quebec | Nicolas Menard | Benoit Veronneau | Jonathan Hubert | Martin Menard |
| Saskatchewan | Ryan Miller | Carmen Koch | Kevin Ackerman | Stuart Person |
| Yukon | Jason Nolan | Jessi Birnie | Bryan Kowalyshen | Joshua Clark |

=== Standings ===
| Locale | Skip | W | L |
|---|---|---|---|
| Alberta | Carter Rycroft | 9 | 3 |
| Manitoba | Mike McEwen | 9 | 3 |
| Ontario | John Morris | 9 | 3 |
| New Brunswick | Rob Heffernan | 9 | 3 |
| Saskatchewan | Ryan Miller | 8 | 4 |
| Nova Scotia | Peter Eddy | 7 | 5 |
| Quebec | Nicolas Menard | 6 | 6 |
| Northern Ontario | Andrew Mikkelsen | 5 | 7 |
| Northwest Territories | Jamie Koe | 5 | 7 |
| Newfoundland | Brad Gushue | 4 | 8 |
| British Columbia | Kevin Dey | 4 | 8 |
| Prince Edward Island | Kyle Stevenson | 2 | 10 |
| Yukon | Jason Nolan | 1 | 11 |

=== Results ===
==== Draw 1 ====
| Sheet A | 1 | 2 | 3 | 4 | 5 | 6 | 7 | 8 | 9 | 10 | 11 | 12 | Final |
| Manitoba (McEwen) 🔨 | 0 | 1 | 0 | 0 | 3 | 0 | 0 | 0 | 1 | 0 | 0 | 1 | 6 |
| Quebec (Menard) | 1 | 0 | 0 | 1 | 0 | 0 | 1 | 0 | 0 | 2 | 0 | 0 | 5 |

| Sheet C | 1 | 2 | 3 | 4 | 5 | 6 | 7 | 8 | 9 | 10 | Final |
|---|---|---|---|---|---|---|---|---|---|---|---|
| Newfoundland (Gushue) 🔨 | 1 | 0 | 0 | 0 | 4 | 1 | 1 | 4 | X | X | 11 |
| British Columbia (Dey) | 0 | 0 | 2 | 1 | 0 | 0 | 0 | 0 | X | X | 3 |

| Sheet E | 1 | 2 | 3 | 4 | 5 | 6 | 7 | 8 | 9 | 10 | Final |
|---|---|---|---|---|---|---|---|---|---|---|---|
| Prince Edward Island (Stevenson) 🔨 | 0 | 2 | 0 | 0 | 1 | 0 | 0 | 2 | 1 | X | 6 |
| Yukon (Nolan) | 0 | 0 | 0 | 1 | 0 | 0 | 1 | 0 | 0 | X | 2 |

| Sheet G | 1 | 2 | 3 | 4 | 5 | 6 | 7 | 8 | 9 | 10 | Final |
|---|---|---|---|---|---|---|---|---|---|---|---|
| Nova Scotia (Eddy) 🔨 | 0 | 0 | 1 | 0 | 1 | 0 | 1 | 0 | 0 | X | 3 |
| New Brunswick (Heffernan) | 1 | 0 | 0 | 1 | 0 | 2 | 0 | 0 | 2 | X | 6 |

| Sheet I | 1 | 2 | 3 | 4 | 5 | 6 | 7 | 8 | 9 | 10 | 11 | Final |
|---|---|---|---|---|---|---|---|---|---|---|---|---|
| Northwest Territories (Koe) 🔨 | 0 | 0 | 0 | 3 | 0 | 0 | 0 | 0 | 1 | 0 | 1 | 5 |
| Saskatchewan (Miller) | 0 | 0 | 0 | 0 | 1 | 0 | 1 | 1 | 0 | 1 | 0 | 4 |

| Sheet K | 1 | 2 | 3 | 4 | 5 | 6 | 7 | 8 | 9 | 10 | Final |
|---|---|---|---|---|---|---|---|---|---|---|---|
| Northern Ontario (Mikkelsen) 🔨 | 0 | 0 | 3 | 0 | 0 | 1 | 1 | 0 | 0 | X | 5 |
| Alberta (Rycroft) | 0 | 0 | 0 | 0 | 0 | 0 | 0 | 0 | 2 | X | 2 |

==== Draw 2 ====
| Sheet B | 1 | 2 | 3 | 4 | 5 | 6 | 7 | 8 | 9 | 10 | Final |
|---|---|---|---|---|---|---|---|---|---|---|---|
| Alberta (Rycroft) 🔨 | 1 | 0 | 0 | 0 | 3 | 1 | 0 | 0 | 0 | X | 5 |
| Yukon (Nolan) | 0 | 0 | 0 | 1 | 0 | 0 | 0 | 2 | 0 | X | 3 |

| Sheet D | 1 | 2 | 3 | 4 | 5 | 6 | 7 | 8 | 9 | 10 | Final |
|---|---|---|---|---|---|---|---|---|---|---|---|
| Saskatchewan (Miller) 🔨 | 0 | 0 | 2 | 0 | 0 | 3 | 0 | 0 | 3 | X | 8 |
| New Brunswick (Heffernan) | 0 | 0 | 0 | 0 | 1 | 0 | 2 | 1 | 0 | X | 4 |

| Sheet F | 1 | 2 | 3 | 4 | 5 | 6 | 7 | 8 | 9 | 10 | Final |
|---|---|---|---|---|---|---|---|---|---|---|---|
| Newfoundland (Gushue) 🔨 | 0 | 0 | 2 | 0 | 2 | 0 | 0 | 1 | 0 | 0 | 5 |
| Nova Scotia (Eddy) | 0 | 0 | 0 | 1 | 0 | 1 | 2 | 0 | 0 | 3 | 7 |

| Sheet H | 1 | 2 | 3 | 4 | 5 | 6 | 7 | 8 | 9 | 10 | Final |
|---|---|---|---|---|---|---|---|---|---|---|---|
| Northwest Territories (Koe) 🔨 | 2 | 0 | 2 | 0 | 1 | 0 | 2 | 0 | 1 | X | 8 |
| Quebec (Menard) | 0 | 1 | 0 | 1 | 0 | 1 | 0 | 0 | 0 | X | 3 |

| Sheet J | 1 | 2 | 3 | 4 | 5 | 6 | 7 | 8 | 9 | 10 | Final |
|---|---|---|---|---|---|---|---|---|---|---|---|
| Manitoba (McEwen) 🔨 | 0 | 0 | 0 | 1 | 0 | 1 | 0 | 2 | 0 | 1 | 5 |
| Ontario (Morris) | 0 | 0 | 0 | 0 | 0 | 0 | 2 | 0 | 1 | 0 | 3 |

| Sheet L | 1 | 2 | 3 | 4 | 5 | 6 | 7 | 8 | 9 | 10 | 11 | Final |
|---|---|---|---|---|---|---|---|---|---|---|---|---|
| British Columbia (Dey) 🔨 | 0 | 0 | 0 | 3 | 0 | 0 | 1 | 0 | 1 | 0 | 1 | 6 |
| Prince Edward Island (Stevenson) | 0 | 0 | 0 | 0 | 2 | 1 | 0 | 1 | 0 | 1 | 0 | 5 |

==== Draw 3 ====
| Sheet A | 1 | 2 | 3 | 4 | 5 | 6 | 7 | 8 | 9 | 10 | 11 | Final |
|---|---|---|---|---|---|---|---|---|---|---|---|---|
| New Brunswick (Heffernan) 🔨 | 0 | 1 | 0 | 0 | 4 | 0 | 3 | 0 | 1 | 0 | 1 | 10 |
| British Columbia (Dey) | 0 | 0 | 1 | 3 | 0 | 2 | 0 | 2 | 0 | 1 | 0 | 9 |

| Sheet C | 1 | 2 | 3 | 4 | 5 | 6 | 7 | 8 | 9 | 10 | Final |
|---|---|---|---|---|---|---|---|---|---|---|---|
| Nova Scotia (Eddy) 🔨 | 0 | 0 | 0 | 0 | 0 | 0 | 1 | X | X | X | 1 |
| Alberta (Rycroft) | 1 | 0 | 2 | 1 | 1 | 3 | 0 | X | X | X | 8 |

| Sheet E | 1 | 2 | 3 | 4 | 5 | 6 | 7 | 8 | 9 | 10 | Final |
|---|---|---|---|---|---|---|---|---|---|---|---|
| Saskatchewan (Miller) 🔨 | 0 | 0 | 1 | 0 | 0 | 1 | 1 | 0 | 1 | 0 | 4 |
| Manitoba (McEwen) | 0 | 0 | 0 | 3 | 1 | 0 | 0 | 1 | 0 | 1 | 6 |

| Sheet G | 1 | 2 | 3 | 4 | 5 | 6 | 7 | 8 | 9 | 10 | Final |
|---|---|---|---|---|---|---|---|---|---|---|---|
| Yukon (Nolan) 🔨 | 0 | 2 | 0 | 0 | 0 | 2 | 0 | 0 | 0 | X | 4 |
| Ontario (Morris) | 0 | 0 | 2 | 0 | 2 | 0 | 2 | 0 | 1 | X | 7 |

| Sheet I | 1 | 2 | 3 | 4 | 5 | 6 | 7 | 8 | 9 | 10 | Final |
|---|---|---|---|---|---|---|---|---|---|---|---|
| Quebec (Menard) 🔨 | 0 | 0 | 4 | 0 | 2 | 0 | 2 | 1 | 0 | X | 9 |
| Northern Ontario (Mikkelsen) | 0 | 0 | 0 | 2 | 0 | 3 | 0 | 0 | 1 | X | 6 |

| Sheet K | 1 | 2 | 3 | 4 | 5 | 6 | 7 | 8 | 9 | 10 | Final |
|---|---|---|---|---|---|---|---|---|---|---|---|
| Northwest Territories (Koe) 🔨 | 0 | 2 | 0 | 1 | 0 | 1 | 0 | 0 | 0 | 1 | 5 |
| Newfoundland (Gushue) | 1 | 0 | 1 | 0 | 1 | 0 | 0 | 1 | 0 | 0 | 4 |

==== Draw 4 ====
| Sheet B | 1 | 2 | 3 | 4 | 5 | 6 | 7 | 8 | 9 | 10 | Final |
|---|---|---|---|---|---|---|---|---|---|---|---|
| Manitoba (McEwen) 🔨 | 1 | 0 | 1 | 0 | 2 | 0 | 1 | 1 | 0 | 1 | 7 |
| Northwest Territories (Koe) | 0 | 1 | 0 | 1 | 0 | 2 | 0 | 0 | 1 | 0 | 5 |

| Sheet D | 1 | 2 | 3 | 4 | 5 | 6 | 7 | 8 | 9 | 10 | Final |
|---|---|---|---|---|---|---|---|---|---|---|---|
| Northern Ontario (Mikkelsen) 🔨 | 1 | 0 | 1 | 0 | 0 | 0 | 2 | 0 | 0 | 1 | 5 |
| Yukon (Nolan) | 0 | 1 | 0 | 1 | 0 | 0 | 0 | 1 | 1 | 0 | 4 |

| Sheet E | 1 | 2 | 3 | 4 | 5 | 6 | 7 | 8 | 9 | 10 | Final |
|---|---|---|---|---|---|---|---|---|---|---|---|
| Ontario (Morris) 🔨 | 0 | 0 | 0 | 0 | 0 | 0 | 3 | 0 | 0 | X | 3 |
| Newfoundland (Gushue) | 0 | 0 | 0 | 0 | 0 | 0 | 0 | 1 | 0 | X | 1 |

| Sheet H | 1 | 2 | 3 | 4 | 5 | 6 | 7 | 8 | 9 | 10 | 11 | Final |
|---|---|---|---|---|---|---|---|---|---|---|---|---|
| British Columbia (Dey) 🔨 | 0 | 1 | 0 | 0 | 1 | 0 | 0 | 0 | 0 | 1 | 0 | 3 |
| Alberta (Rycroft) | 1 | 0 | 1 | 0 | 0 | 0 | 0 | 1 | 0 | 0 | 2 | 5 |

| Sheet I | 1 | 2 | 3 | 4 | 5 | 6 | 7 | 8 | 9 | 10 | Final |
|---|---|---|---|---|---|---|---|---|---|---|---|
| Prince Edward Island (Stevenson) 🔨 | 0 | 1 | 0 | 0 | 0 | 0 | 2 | 0 | 0 | X | 3 |
| New Brunswick (Heffernan) | 1 | 0 | 0 | 0 | 2 | 1 | 0 | 2 | 1 | X | 7 |

| Sheet K | 1 | 2 | 3 | 4 | 5 | 6 | 7 | 8 | 9 | 10 | Final |
|---|---|---|---|---|---|---|---|---|---|---|---|
| Quebec (Menard) 🔨 | 0 | 2 | 1 | 0 | 2 | 1 | 0 | 2 | 0 | X | 8 |
| Nova Scotia (Eddy) | 0 | 0 | 0 | 1 | 0 | 0 | 2 | 0 | 1 | X | 4 |

==== Draw 5 ====
| Sheet A | 1 | 2 | 3 | 4 | 5 | 6 | 7 | 8 | 9 | 10 | Final |
|---|---|---|---|---|---|---|---|---|---|---|---|
| Yukon (Nolan) 🔨 | 1 | 0 | 0 | 0 | 0 | 2 | 0 | X | X | X | 3 |
| Nova Scotia (Eddy) | 0 | 3 | 1 | 3 | 1 | 0 | 2 | X | X | X | 10 |

| Sheet C | 1 | 2 | 3 | 4 | 5 | 6 | 7 | 8 | 9 | 10 | Final |
|---|---|---|---|---|---|---|---|---|---|---|---|
| Saskatchewan (Miller) 🔨 | 0 | 2 | 0 | 0 | 0 | 0 | 1 | 0 | 0 | 1 | 4 |
| Quebec (Menard) | 0 | 0 | 0 | 0 | 0 | 1 | 0 | 2 | 0 | 0 | 3 |

| Sheet F | 1 | 2 | 3 | 4 | 5 | 6 | 7 | 8 | 9 | 10 | Final |
|---|---|---|---|---|---|---|---|---|---|---|---|
| Prince Edward Island (Stevenson) 🔨 | 0 | 2 | 2 | 0 | 0 | 1 | 0 | 0 | 3 | X | 8 |
| Northwest Territories (Koe) | 1 | 0 | 0 | 2 | 1 | 0 | 2 | 0 | 0 | X | 6 |

| Sheet G | 1 | 2 | 3 | 4 | 5 | 6 | 7 | 8 | 9 | 10 | Final |
|---|---|---|---|---|---|---|---|---|---|---|---|
| Northern Ontario (Mikkelsen) 🔨 | 0 | 2 | 0 | 0 | 2 | 0 | 0 | 0 | 0 | X | 4 |
| Manitoba (McEwen) | 0 | 0 | 0 | 1 | 0 | 3 | 1 | 2 | 1 | X | 8 |

| Sheet I | 1 | 2 | 3 | 4 | 5 | 6 | 7 | 8 | 9 | 10 | Final |
|---|---|---|---|---|---|---|---|---|---|---|---|
| Newfoundland (Gushue) 🔨 | 1 | 1 | 0 | 0 | 0 | 1 | 0 | 0 | 0 | 0 | 3 |
| Alberta (Rycroft) | 0 | 0 | 0 | 1 | 2 | 0 | 0 | 0 | 1 | 1 | 5 |

| Sheet K | 1 | 2 | 3 | 4 | 5 | 6 | 7 | 8 | 9 | 10 | Final |
|---|---|---|---|---|---|---|---|---|---|---|---|
| New Brunswick (Heffernan) 🔨 | 1 | 0 | 0 | 0 | 1 | 0 | 0 | 0 | 0 | X | 2 |
| Ontario (Morris) | 0 | 0 | 1 | 0 | 0 | 2 | 0 | 1 | 2 | X | 6 |

==== Draw 6 ====
| Sheet B | 1 | 2 | 3 | 4 | 5 | 6 | 7 | 8 | 9 | 10 | Final |
|---|---|---|---|---|---|---|---|---|---|---|---|
| Ontario (Morris) 🔨 | 1 | 0 | 1 | 1 | 3 | 1 | 0 | X | X | X | 7 |
| British Columbia (Dey) | 0 | 0 | 0 | 0 | 0 | 0 | 1 | X | X | X | 1 |

| Sheet C | 1 | 2 | 3 | 4 | 5 | 6 | 7 | 8 | 9 | 10 | Final |
|---|---|---|---|---|---|---|---|---|---|---|---|
| Northwest Territories (Koe) 🔨 | 2 | 0 | 0 | 0 | 2 | 1 | 0 | 1 | 0 | 1 | 7 |
| Northern Ontario (Mikkelsen) | 0 | 4 | 1 | 1 | 0 | 0 | 2 | 0 | 0 | 0 | 8 |

| Sheet F | 1 | 2 | 3 | 4 | 5 | 6 | 7 | 8 | 9 | 10 | Final |
|---|---|---|---|---|---|---|---|---|---|---|---|
| Manitoba (McEwen) 🔨 | 0 | 0 | 0 | 1 | 0 | 2 | 0 | 0 | 3 | X | 6 |
| New Brunswick (Heffernan) | 0 | 0 | 0 | 0 | 1 | 0 | 0 | 2 | 0 | X | 3 |

| Sheet H | 1 | 2 | 3 | 4 | 5 | 6 | 7 | 8 | 9 | 10 | Final |
|---|---|---|---|---|---|---|---|---|---|---|---|
| Newfoundland (Gushue) 🔨 | 1 | 1 | 3 | 0 | 3 | 0 | 3 | X | X | X | 11 |
| Yukon (Nolan) | 0 | 0 | 0 | 1 | 0 | 1 | 0 | X | X | X | 2 |

| Sheet J | 1 | 2 | 3 | 4 | 5 | 6 | 7 | 8 | 9 | 10 | Final |
|---|---|---|---|---|---|---|---|---|---|---|---|
| Nova Scotia (Eddy) 🔨 | 1 | 0 | 1 | 0 | 3 | 0 | 1 | 0 | 2 | X | 8 |
| Saskatchewan (Miller) | 0 | 2 | 0 | 1 | 0 | 1 | 0 | 2 | 0 | X | 6 |

| Sheet K | 1 | 2 | 3 | 4 | 5 | 6 | 7 | 8 | 9 | 10 | Final |
|---|---|---|---|---|---|---|---|---|---|---|---|
| Alberta (Rycroft) 🔨 | 1 | 2 | 0 | 0 | 0 | 0 | 0 | 0 | 0 | X | 3 |
| Prince Edward Island (Stevenson) | 0 | 0 | 0 | 2 | 0 | 0 | 0 | 0 | 0 | X | 2 |

==== Draw 7 ====
| Sheet A | 1 | 2 | 3 | 4 | 5 | 6 | 7 | 8 | 9 | 10 | Final |
|---|---|---|---|---|---|---|---|---|---|---|---|
| Saskatchewan (Miller) 🔨 | 0 | 0 | 1 | 0 | 4 | 0 | 0 | 4 | X | X | 9 |
| Alberta (Rycroft) | 0 | 0 | 0 | 1 | 0 | 1 | 1 | 0 | X | X | 3 |

| Sheet C | 1 | 2 | 3 | 4 | 5 | 6 | 7 | 8 | 9 | 10 | Final |
|---|---|---|---|---|---|---|---|---|---|---|---|
| Ontario (Morris) 🔨 | 0 | 2 | 1 | 1 | 3 | X | X | X | X | X | 7 |
| Prince Edward Island (Stevenson) | 0 | 0 | 0 | 0 | 0 | X | X | X | X | X | 0 |

| Sheet F | 1 | 2 | 3 | 4 | 5 | 6 | 7 | 8 | 9 | 10 | Final |
|---|---|---|---|---|---|---|---|---|---|---|---|
| Yukon (Nolan) 🔨 | 0 | 1 | 0 | 3 | 0 | 1 | 0 | 0 | 0 | 1 | 6 |
| Quebec (Menard) | 2 | 0 | 1 | 0 | 1 | 0 | 1 | 1 | 1 | 0 | 7 |

| Sheet G | 1 | 2 | 3 | 4 | 5 | 6 | 7 | 8 | 9 | 10 | Final |
|---|---|---|---|---|---|---|---|---|---|---|---|
| Nova Scotia (Eddy) 🔨 | 1 | 0 | 0 | 1 | 1 | 1 | 0 | 0 | 1 | 0 | 5 |
| Northwest Territories (Koe) | 0 | 1 | 2 | 0 | 0 | 0 | 1 | 1 | 0 | 1 | 6 |

| Sheet J | 1 | 2 | 3 | 4 | 5 | 6 | 7 | 8 | 9 | 10 | Final |
|---|---|---|---|---|---|---|---|---|---|---|---|
| New Brunswick (Heffernan) 🔨 | 0 | 1 | 0 | 0 | 0 | 0 | 2 | 3 | X | X | 6 |
| Northern Ontario (Mikkelsen) | 0 | 0 | 1 | 0 | 0 | 0 | 0 | 0 | X | X | 1 |

| Sheet K | 1 | 2 | 3 | 4 | 5 | 6 | 7 | 8 | 9 | 10 | Final |
|---|---|---|---|---|---|---|---|---|---|---|---|
| British Columbia (Dey) 🔨 | 0 | 2 | 1 | 0 | 0 | 0 | 5 | X | X | X | 8 |
| Manitoba (McEwen) | 0 | 0 | 0 | 2 | 0 | 0 | 0 | X | X | X | 2 |

==== Draw 8 ====
| Sheet B | 1 | 2 | 3 | 4 | 5 | 6 | 7 | 8 | 9 | 10 | Final |
|---|---|---|---|---|---|---|---|---|---|---|---|
| Prince Edward Island (Stevenson) 🔨 | 2 | 0 | 1 | 0 | 1 | 0 | 1 | 0 | 0 | X | 5 |
| Newfoundland (Gushue) | 0 | 2 | 0 | 1 | 0 | 3 | 0 | 1 | 2 | X | 9 |

| Sheet D | 1 | 2 | 3 | 4 | 5 | 6 | 7 | 8 | 9 | 10 | 11 | Final |
|---|---|---|---|---|---|---|---|---|---|---|---|---|
| Quebec (Menard) 🔨 | 1 | 0 | 0 | 0 | 3 | 0 | 0 | 0 | 0 | 0 | 1 | 5 |
| British Columbia (Dey) | 0 | 0 | 0 | 2 | 0 | 0 | 1 | 0 | 0 | 1 | 0 | 4 |

| Sheet F | 1 | 2 | 3 | 4 | 5 | 6 | 7 | 8 | 9 | 10 | Final |
|---|---|---|---|---|---|---|---|---|---|---|---|
| Northern Ontario (Mikkelsen) 🔨 | 0 | 0 | 1 | 0 | 0 | 0 | 0 | X | X | X | 1 |
| Saskatchewan (Miller) | 0 | 0 | 0 | 2 | 2 | 3 | 0 | X | X | X | 7 |

| Sheet H | 1 | 2 | 3 | 4 | 5 | 6 | 7 | 8 | 9 | 10 | Final |
|---|---|---|---|---|---|---|---|---|---|---|---|
| Alberta (Rycroft) 🔨 | 1 | 1 | 1 | 0 | 0 | 1 | 0 | 0 | 1 | 0 | 5 |
| Ontario (Morris) | 0 | 0 | 0 | 1 | 1 | 0 | 0 | 1 | 0 | 1 | 4 |

| Sheet I | 1 | 2 | 3 | 4 | 5 | 6 | 7 | 8 | 9 | 10 | Final |
|---|---|---|---|---|---|---|---|---|---|---|---|
| Yukon (Nolan) 🔨 | 0 | 0 | 1 | 0 | 2 | 0 | X | X | X | X | 3 |
| Manitoba (McEwen) | 2 | 2 | 0 | 6 | 0 | 3 | X | X | X | X | 13 |

| Sheet L | 1 | 2 | 3 | 4 | 5 | 6 | 7 | 8 | 9 | 10 | Final |
|---|---|---|---|---|---|---|---|---|---|---|---|
| New Brunswick (Heffernan) 🔨 | 0 | 1 | 0 | 2 | 0 | 2 | 1 | 0 | 1 | X | 7 |
| Northwest Territories (Koe) | 0 | 0 | 1 | 0 | 2 | 0 | 0 | 2 | 0 | X | 5 |

==== Draw 9 ====
| Sheet B | 1 | 2 | 3 | 4 | 5 | 6 | 7 | 8 | 9 | 10 | Final |
|---|---|---|---|---|---|---|---|---|---|---|---|
| Quebec (Menard) 🔨 | 0 | 0 | 0 | 1 | 0 | 0 | 1 | 0 | 0 | X | 2 |
| New Brunswick (Heffernan) | 0 | 0 | 0 | 0 | 1 | 1 | 0 | 1 | 1 | X | 4 |

| Sheet D | 1 | 2 | 3 | 4 | 5 | 6 | 7 | 8 | 9 | 10 | Final |
|---|---|---|---|---|---|---|---|---|---|---|---|
| Manitoba (McEwen) 🔨 | 0 | 1 | 1 | 0 | 0 | 2 | 0 | 1 | 0 | X | 5 |
| Newfoundland (Gushue) | 0 | 0 | 0 | 0 | 0 | 0 | 2 | 0 | 1 | X | 3 |

| Sheet E | 1 | 2 | 3 | 4 | 5 | 6 | 7 | 8 | 9 | 10 | Final |
|---|---|---|---|---|---|---|---|---|---|---|---|
| Prince Edward Island (Stevenson) 🔨 | 1 | 2 | 0 | 1 | 0 | 0 | 0 | 0 | 1 | 0 | 5 |
| Nova Scotia (Eddy) | 0 | 0 | 2 | 0 | 1 | 2 | 0 | 1 | 0 | 1 | 7 |

| Sheet G | 1 | 2 | 3 | 4 | 5 | 6 | 7 | 8 | 9 | 10 | Final |
|---|---|---|---|---|---|---|---|---|---|---|---|
| British Columbia (Dey) 🔨 | 0 | 0 | 0 | 0 | 1 | 0 | 0 | 2 | 0 | 0 | 3 |
| Saskatchewan (Miller) | 0 | 1 | 0 | 0 | 0 | 1 | 1 | 0 | 0 | 1 | 4 |

| Sheet J | 1 | 2 | 3 | 4 | 5 | 6 | 7 | 8 | 9 | 10 | Final |
|---|---|---|---|---|---|---|---|---|---|---|---|
| Alberta (Rycroft) 🔨 | 0 | 0 | 0 | 2 | 0 | 0 | 4 | X | X | X | 6 |
| Northwest Territories (Koe) | 0 | 0 | 0 | 0 | 1 | 0 | 0 | X | X | X | 1 |

| Sheet L | 1 | 2 | 3 | 4 | 5 | 6 | 7 | 8 | 9 | 10 | Final |
|---|---|---|---|---|---|---|---|---|---|---|---|
| Ontario (Morris) 🔨 | 0 | 0 | 0 | 2 | 0 | 2 | 1 | 0 | 0 | X | 5 |
| Northern Ontario (Mikkelsen) | 0 | 0 | 0 | 0 | 1 | 0 | 0 | 1 | 0 | X | 2 |

==== Draw 10 ====
| Sheet A | 1 | 2 | 3 | 4 | 5 | 6 | 7 | 8 | 9 | 10 | Final |
|---|---|---|---|---|---|---|---|---|---|---|---|
| Nova Scotia (Eddy) 🔨 | 0 | 0 | 2 | 1 | 0 | 0 | 1 | 0 | 2 | X | 6 |
| British Columbia (Dey) | 0 | 1 | 0 | 0 | 1 | 1 | 0 | 1 | 0 | X | 4 |

| Sheet D | 1 | 2 | 3 | 4 | 5 | 6 | 7 | 8 | 9 | 10 | Final |
|---|---|---|---|---|---|---|---|---|---|---|---|
| New Brunswick (Heffernan) 🔨 | 2 | 0 | 1 | 0 | 0 | 0 | 0 | 1 | 2 | X | 6 |
| Alberta (Rycroft) | 0 | 1 | 0 | 1 | 0 | 0 | 0 | 0 | 0 | X | 2 |

| Sheet E | 1 | 2 | 3 | 4 | 5 | 6 | 7 | 8 | 9 | 10 | Final |
|---|---|---|---|---|---|---|---|---|---|---|---|
| Northwest Territories (Koe) 🔨 | 0 | 0 | 1 | 0 | 0 | 0 | 1 | 0 | X | X | 2 |
| Yukon (Nolan) | 0 | 1 | 0 | 1 | 1 | 1 | 0 | 2 | X | X | 6 |

| Sheet G | 1 | 2 | 3 | 4 | 5 | 6 | 7 | 8 | 9 | 10 | Final |
|---|---|---|---|---|---|---|---|---|---|---|---|
| Newfoundland (Gushue) 🔨 | 0 | 1 | 0 | 2 | 1 | 1 | 1 | 0 | X | X | 6 |
| Northern Ontario (Mikkelsen) | 0 | 0 | 1 | 0 | 0 | 0 | 0 | 1 | X | X | 2 |

| Sheet J | 1 | 2 | 3 | 4 | 5 | 6 | 7 | 8 | 9 | 10 | Final |
|---|---|---|---|---|---|---|---|---|---|---|---|
| Ontario (Morris) 🔨 | 2 | 0 | 2 | 1 | 3 | X | X | X | X | X | 8 |
| Quebec (Menard) | 0 | 1 | 0 | 0 | 0 | X | X | X | X | X | 1 |

| Sheet L | 1 | 2 | 3 | 4 | 5 | 6 | 7 | 8 | 9 | 10 | Final |
|---|---|---|---|---|---|---|---|---|---|---|---|
| Saskatchewan (Miller) 🔨 | 0 | 2 | 3 | 0 | 0 | 0 | 0 | 0 | 0 | 1 | 6 |
| Prince Edward Island (Stevenson) | 0 | 0 | 0 | 3 | 0 | 0 | 1 | 0 | 0 | 0 | 4 |

==== Draw 11 ====
| Sheet A | 1 | 2 | 3 | 4 | 5 | 6 | 7 | 8 | 9 | 10 | Final |
|---|---|---|---|---|---|---|---|---|---|---|---|
| Prince Edward Island (Stevenson) 🔨 | 0 | 0 | 1 | 0 | 0 | 0 | 1 | 0 | 1 | 0 | 3 |
| Manitoba (McEwen) | 0 | 0 | 0 | 1 | 0 | 0 | 0 | 2 | 0 | 2 | 5 |

| Sheet D | 1 | 2 | 3 | 4 | 5 | 6 | 7 | 8 | 9 | 10 | Final |
|---|---|---|---|---|---|---|---|---|---|---|---|
| Northwest Territories (Koe) 🔨 | 1 | 0 | 1 | 0 | 1 | 0 | 0 | 1 | 0 | X | 4 |
| Ontario (Morris) | 0 | 1 | 0 | 2 | 0 | 3 | 0 | 0 | 0 | X | 6 |

| Sheet E | 1 | 2 | 3 | 4 | 5 | 6 | 7 | 8 | 9 | 10 | Final |
|---|---|---|---|---|---|---|---|---|---|---|---|
| Newfoundland (Gushue) 🔨 | 0 | 0 | 0 | 1 | 0 | 1 | 0 | 2 | 0 | 0 | 4 |
| Saskatchewan (Miller) | 0 | 0 | 0 | 0 | 2 | 0 | 1 | 0 | 0 | 2 | 5 |

| Sheet G | 1 | 2 | 3 | 4 | 5 | 6 | 7 | 8 | 9 | 10 | Final |
|---|---|---|---|---|---|---|---|---|---|---|---|
| Alberta (Rycroft) 🔨 | 1 | 0 | 0 | 1 | 0 | 2 | 0 | 1 | 0 | 2 | 7 |
| Quebec (Menard) | 0 | 0 | 2 | 0 | 2 | 0 | 2 | 0 | 0 | 0 | 6 |

| Sheet I | 1 | 2 | 3 | 4 | 5 | 6 | 7 | 8 | 9 | 10 | Final |
|---|---|---|---|---|---|---|---|---|---|---|---|
| Northern Ontario (Mikkelsen) 🔨 | 0 | 0 | 3 | 0 | 4 | 0 | 0 | X | X | X | 7 |
| Nova Scotia (Eddy) | 0 | 1 | 0 | 1 | 0 | 1 | 1 | X | X | X | 4 |

| Sheet L | 1 | 2 | 3 | 4 | 5 | 6 | 7 | 8 | 9 | 10 | Final |
|---|---|---|---|---|---|---|---|---|---|---|---|
| Yukon (Nolan) 🔨 | 1 | 0 | 0 | 1 | 0 | 0 | 0 | 2 | 1 | 1 | 6 |
| British Columbia (Dey) | 0 | 3 | 0 | 0 | 1 | 0 | 3 | 0 | 0 | 0 | 7 |

==== Draw 12 ====
| Sheet A | 1 | 2 | 3 | 4 | 5 | 6 | 7 | 8 | 9 | 10 | Final |
|---|---|---|---|---|---|---|---|---|---|---|---|
| New Brunswick (Heffernan) 🔨 | 2 | 1 | 0 | 0 | 2 | 2 | X | X | X | X | 7 |
| Newfoundland (Gushue) | 0 | 0 | 1 | 0 | 0 | 0 | X | X | X | X | 1 |

| Sheet C | 1 | 2 | 3 | 4 | 5 | 6 | 7 | 8 | 9 | 10 | Final |
|---|---|---|---|---|---|---|---|---|---|---|---|
| Quebec (Menard) 🔨 | 0 | 2 | 0 | 3 | 2 | 2 | X | X | X | X | 9 |
| Prince Edward Island (Stevenson) | 0 | 0 | 1 | 0 | 0 | 0 | X | X | X | X | 1 |

| Sheet E | 1 | 2 | 3 | 4 | 5 | 6 | 7 | 8 | 9 | 10 | Final |
|---|---|---|---|---|---|---|---|---|---|---|---|
| British Columbia (Dey) 🔨 | 0 | 5 | 2 | 0 | 3 | X | X | X | X | X | 10 |
| Northern Ontario (Mikkelsen) | 0 | 0 | 0 | 1 | 0 | X | X | X | X | X | 1 |

| Sheet H | 1 | 2 | 3 | 4 | 5 | 6 | 7 | 8 | 9 | 10 | Final |
|---|---|---|---|---|---|---|---|---|---|---|---|
| Nova Scotia (Eddy) 🔨 | 0 | 1 | 1 | 1 | 0 | 0 | 2 | 0 | 0 | 2 | 7 |
| Ontario (Morris) | 0 | 0 | 0 | 0 | 1 | 1 | 0 | 1 | 0 | 0 | 3 |

| Sheet I | 1 | 2 | 3 | 4 | 5 | 6 | 7 | 8 | 9 | 10 | Final |
|---|---|---|---|---|---|---|---|---|---|---|---|
| Saskatchewan (Miller) 🔨 | 0 | 1 | 0 | 0 | 2 | 0 | 3 | 0 | 4 | X | 10 |
| Yukon (Nolan) | 0 | 0 | 1 | 0 | 0 | 1 | 0 | 1 | 0 | X | 3 |

| Sheet L | 1 | 2 | 3 | 4 | 5 | 6 | 7 | 8 | 9 | 10 | Final |
|---|---|---|---|---|---|---|---|---|---|---|---|
| Alberta (Rycroft) 🔨 | 1 | 0 | 0 | 0 | 1 | 0 | 1 | 0 | 3 | X | 6 |
| Manitoba (McEwen) | 0 | 0 | 0 | 0 | 0 | 1 | 0 | 0 | 0 | X | 1 |

==== Draw 13 ====
| Sheet B | 1 | 2 | 3 | 4 | 5 | 6 | 7 | 8 | 9 | 10 | Final |
|---|---|---|---|---|---|---|---|---|---|---|---|
| Ontario (Morris) 🔨 | 1 | 0 | 0 | 0 | 1 | 0 | 2 | 1 | 0 | X | 5 |
| Saskatchewan (Miller) | 0 | 0 | 0 | 2 | 0 | 1 | 0 | 0 | 0 | X | 3 |

| Sheet C | 1 | 2 | 3 | 4 | 5 | 6 | 7 | 8 | 9 | 10 | Final |
|---|---|---|---|---|---|---|---|---|---|---|---|
| Yukon (Nolan) 🔨 | 0 | 2 | 0 | 0 | 0 | 1 | 0 | 1 | 0 | 0 | 4 |
| New Brunswick (Heffernan) | 0 | 0 | 0 | 0 | 1 | 0 | 1 | 0 | 2 | 3 | 7 |

| Sheet F | 1 | 2 | 3 | 4 | 5 | 6 | 7 | 8 | 9 | 10 | Final |
|---|---|---|---|---|---|---|---|---|---|---|---|
| Manitoba (McEwen) 🔨 | 0 | 0 | 1 | 1 | 0 | 1 | 0 | 1 | 0 | X | 4 |
| Nova Scotia (Eddy) | 0 | 1 | 0 | 0 | 2 | 0 | 0 | 0 | 3 | X | 6 |

| Sheet H | 1 | 2 | 3 | 4 | 5 | 6 | 7 | 8 | 9 | 10 | Final |
|---|---|---|---|---|---|---|---|---|---|---|---|
| Northern Ontario (Mikkelsen) 🔨 | 0 | 0 | 1 | 0 | 1 | 1 | 0 | 2 | 0 | 2 | 7 |
| Prince Edward Island (Stevenson) | 0 | 1 | 0 | 2 | 0 | 0 | 2 | 0 | 1 | 0 | 6 |

| Sheet I | 1 | 2 | 3 | 4 | 5 | 6 | 7 | 8 | 9 | 10 | Final |
|---|---|---|---|---|---|---|---|---|---|---|---|
| British Columbia (Dey) 🔨 | 0 | 1 | 0 | 0 | 1 | 0 | 0 | 0 | 0 | X | 2 |
| Northwest Territories (Koe) | 0 | 0 | 2 | 0 | 0 | 1 | 0 | 0 | 3 | X | 6 |

| Sheet L | 1 | 2 | 3 | 4 | 5 | 6 | 7 | 8 | 9 | 10 | 11 | Final |
|---|---|---|---|---|---|---|---|---|---|---|---|---|
| Quebec (Menard) 🔨 | 0 | 0 | 0 | 0 | 0 | 2 | 0 | 2 | 1 | 0 | 1 | 6 |
| Newfoundland (Gushue) | 0 | 2 | 0 | 0 | 1 | 0 | 1 | 0 | 0 | 1 | 0 | 5 |

=== Playoffs ===
| Tiebreaker | | Semifinal | | Final |
| Ontario | 8 |
| New Brunswick | 3 | Ontario | 8 |
| | | Manitoba | 4 |
| | | | | Ontario | 5 |
| | | | | Alberta | 3 |

==== Tiebreaker ====
| Sheet I | 1 | 2 | 3 | 4 | 5 | 6 | 7 | 8 | 9 | 10 | Final |
|---|---|---|---|---|---|---|---|---|---|---|---|
| Ontario (Morris) 🔨 | 3 | 2 | 0 | 1 | 0 | 2 | 0 | X | X | X | 8 |
| New Brunswick (Heffernan) | 0 | 0 | 1 | 0 | 1 | 0 | 1 | X | X | X | 3 |

Player percentages
| Ontario | | New Brunswick | |
|---|---|---|---|
| Brent Laing | 77% | Kevin Tippett | 82% |
| Andy Ormsby | 89% | Ryan Cain | 77% |
| Craig Savill | 88% | Patrice Robichaud | 63% |
| John Morris | 93% | Rob Heffernan | 68% |
| Total | 87% | Total | 72% |

==== Semifinal ====
| Sheet J | 1 | 2 | 3 | 4 | 5 | 6 | 7 | 8 | 9 | 10 | Final |
|---|---|---|---|---|---|---|---|---|---|---|---|
| Ontario (Morris) | 0 | 3 | 0 | 0 | 1 | 0 | 2 | 0 | 2 | X | 8 |
| Manitoba (McEwen) 🔨 | 0 | 0 | 2 | 0 | 0 | 1 | 0 | 1 | 0 | X | 4 |

Player percentages
| Ontario | | Manitoba | |
|---|---|---|---|
| Brent Laing | 81% | Kevin Schmidt | 66% |
| Andy Ormsby | 79% | Bryce Granger | 88% |
| Craig Savill | 84% | David Chalmers | 80% |
| John Morris | 88% | Mike McEwen | 63% |
| Total | 83% | Total | 74% |

==== Final ====
| Sheet F | 1 | 2 | 3 | 4 | 5 | 6 | 7 | 8 | 9 | 10 | Final |
|---|---|---|---|---|---|---|---|---|---|---|---|
| Ontario (Morris) | 0 | 0 | 0 | 1 | 0 | 2 | 0 | 1 | 0 | 1 | 5 |
| Alberta (Rycroft) 🔨 | 0 | 0 | 0 | 0 | 2 | 0 | 0 | 0 | 1 | 0 | 3 |

Player percentages
| Ontario | | Alberta | |
|---|---|---|---|
| Brent Laing | 76% | Jason Lesmeister | 81% |
| Andy Ormsby | 80% | Marc Kennedy | 73% |
| Craig Savill | 80% | Glen Kennedy | 68% |
| John Morris | 78% | Carter Rycroft | 69% |
| Total | 78% | Total | 73% |

== Women's ==
=== Teams ===
| Province / Territory | Skip | Third | Second | Lead |
|---|---|---|---|---|
| Alberta | Bronwen Saunders | Jennifer Vejprava | Tara Runquist | Erika Hildebrand |
| British Columbia | Melody Chilibeck | Pauline Levasseur | Victoria Cannon | Denise Levasseur |
| Manitoba | Lisa Roy | Amy Rafnkelsson | Kerry Maynes | Jaimie Coxworth |
| New Brunswick | Melissa McClure | Nancy Toner | Brigitte McClure | Bethany Toner |
| Newfoundland | Cindy Miller | Kim Conway | Stephanie LeDrew | Laura Strong |
| Northern Ontario | Elaine Uhryn | Kari MacLean | Krista Scharf | Amy Stachiw |
| Northwest Territories | Kerry Koe | Shona Barbour | Stacey Treptau | Meagan Crawley |
| Nova Scotia | Meredith Doyle | Beth Roach | Krista Normore | Candice MacLean |
| Ontario | Jenn Hanna | Amanda Vanderspank | Julie Colquhoun | Leesa Broder |
| Prince Edward Island | Suzanne Gaudet | Stefanie Richard | Stephanie Pickett | Kelly Higgins |
| Quebec | Marie-France Larouche | Nancy Belanger | Marie-Eve Letourneau | Valérie Grenier |
| Saskatchewan | Shannon Farough | Rachel Scholz | Jill Bacon | Amanda MacDonald |
| Yukon | Nicole Baldwin | Jaime Milward | Hailey Birnie | Jaime Hewitt |

=== Standings ===
| Locale | Skip | W | L |
|---|---|---|---|
| Ontario | Jenn Hanna | 10 | 2 |
| New Brunswick | Melissa McClure | 10 | 2 |
| Prince Edward Island | Suzanne Gaudet | 9 | 3 |
| Nova Scotia | Meredith Doyle | 8 | 4 |
| Saskatchewan | Shannon Farough | 8 | 4 |
| Northern Ontario | Elaine Uhryn | 7 | 5 |
| Yukon | Nicole Baldwin | 6 | 6 |
| Alberta | Bronwen Saunders | 5 | 7 |
| Quebec | Marie-France Larouche | 5 | 7 |
| Manitoba | Lisa Roy | 5 | 7 |
| Northwest Territories | Kerry Koe | 2 | 10 |
| Newfoundland | Cindy Miller | 2 | 10 |
| British Columbia | Melody Chilibeck | 1 | 11 |

=== Results ===
==== Draw 1 ====
| Sheet B | 1 | 2 | 3 | 4 | 5 | 6 | 7 | 8 | 9 | 10 | Final |
|---|---|---|---|---|---|---|---|---|---|---|---|
| Manitoba (Roy) 🔨 | 0 | 1 | 0 | 1 | 0 | 1 | 0 | 0 | 2 | X | 5 |
| Quebec (Larouche) | 0 | 0 | 3 | 0 | 3 | 0 | 1 | 1 | 0 | X | 8 |

| Sheet D | 1 | 2 | 3 | 4 | 5 | 6 | 7 | 8 | 9 | 10 | Final |
|---|---|---|---|---|---|---|---|---|---|---|---|
| Newfoundland (Miller) 🔨 | 1 | 0 | 0 | 0 | 1 | 0 | 1 | 0 | 2 | 0 | 5 |
| British Columbia (Chilibeck) | 0 | 1 | 0 | 1 | 0 | 0 | 0 | 1 | 0 | 1 | 4 |

| Sheet F | 1 | 2 | 3 | 4 | 5 | 6 | 7 | 8 | 9 | 10 | Final |
|---|---|---|---|---|---|---|---|---|---|---|---|
| Prince Edward Island (Gaudet) 🔨 | 1 | 0 | 1 | 0 | 2 | 0 | 1 | 1 | 2 | X | 8 |
| Yukon (Baldwin) | 0 | 1 | 0 | 1 | 0 | 1 | 0 | 0 | 0 | X | 3 |

| Sheet H | 1 | 2 | 3 | 4 | 5 | 6 | 7 | 8 | 9 | 10 | Final |
|---|---|---|---|---|---|---|---|---|---|---|---|
| Nova Scotia (Doyle) 🔨 | 1 | 0 | 0 | 0 | 0 | 0 | 1 | 0 | X | X | 2 |
| New Brunswick (McClure) | 0 | 1 | 1 | 2 | 2 | 1 | 0 | 3 | X | X | 10 |

| Sheet J | 1 | 2 | 3 | 4 | 5 | 6 | 7 | 8 | 9 | 10 | Final |
|---|---|---|---|---|---|---|---|---|---|---|---|
| Northwest Territories (Koe) 🔨 | 0 | 0 | 0 | 1 | 0 | 0 | 0 | X | X | X | 1 |
| Saskatchewan (Farough) | 1 | 2 | 1 | 0 | 1 | 2 | 3 | X | X | X | 10 |

| Sheet L | 1 | 2 | 3 | 4 | 5 | 6 | 7 | 8 | 9 | 10 | Final |
|---|---|---|---|---|---|---|---|---|---|---|---|
| Northern Ontario (Uhryn) 🔨 | 2 | 0 | 0 | 0 | 2 | 0 | 1 | 0 | 1 | 1 | 7 |
| Alberta (Saunders) | 0 | 1 | 0 | 1 | 0 | 1 | 0 | 2 | 0 | 0 | 5 |

==== Draw 2 ====
| Sheet A | 1 | 2 | 3 | 4 | 5 | 6 | 7 | 8 | 9 | 10 | Final |
|---|---|---|---|---|---|---|---|---|---|---|---|
| Alberta (Saunders) 🔨 | 2 | 0 | 0 | 1 | 0 | 2 | 0 | 1 | 1 | 0 | 7 |
| Yukon (Baldwin) | 0 | 1 | 1 | 0 | 3 | 0 | 1 | 0 | 0 | 2 | 8 |

| Sheet C | 1 | 2 | 3 | 4 | 5 | 6 | 7 | 8 | 9 | 10 | Final |
|---|---|---|---|---|---|---|---|---|---|---|---|
| Saskatchewan (Farough) 🔨 | 0 | 2 | 0 | 0 | 1 | 3 | 0 | 2 | 0 | X | 8 |
| New Brunswick (McClure) | 0 | 0 | 1 | 2 | 0 | 0 | 1 | 0 | 1 | X | 5 |

| Sheet E | 1 | 2 | 3 | 4 | 5 | 6 | 7 | 8 | 9 | 10 | Final |
|---|---|---|---|---|---|---|---|---|---|---|---|
| Newfoundland (Miller) 🔨 | 2 | 0 | 0 | 1 | 0 | 1 | 0 | 1 | 0 | X | 5 |
| Nova Scotia (Doyle) | 0 | 2 | 1 | 0 | 2 | 0 | 2 | 0 | 1 | X | 8 |

| Sheet G | 1 | 2 | 3 | 4 | 5 | 6 | 7 | 8 | 9 | 10 | Final |
|---|---|---|---|---|---|---|---|---|---|---|---|
| Northwest Territories (Koe) 🔨 | 0 | 0 | 0 | 1 | 0 | 0 | 0 | 0 | X | X | 1 |
| Quebec (Larouche) | 0 | 0 | 1 | 0 | 2 | 1 | 3 | 2 | X | X | 9 |

| Sheet I | 1 | 2 | 3 | 4 | 5 | 6 | 7 | 8 | 9 | 10 | Final |
|---|---|---|---|---|---|---|---|---|---|---|---|
| Manitoba (Roy) 🔨 | 0 | 0 | 3 | 2 | 0 | 0 | 0 | 0 | 0 | 0 | 5 |
| Ontario (Hanna) | 0 | 1 | 0 | 0 | 2 | 0 | 0 | 0 | 1 | 0 | 4 |

| Sheet K | 1 | 2 | 3 | 4 | 5 | 6 | 7 | 8 | 9 | 10 | 11 | Final |
|---|---|---|---|---|---|---|---|---|---|---|---|---|
| British Columbia (Chilibeck) 🔨 | 1 | 0 | 0 | 0 | 1 | 1 | 0 | 1 | 0 | 1 | 0 | 5 |
| Prince Edward Island (Gaudet) | 0 | 0 | 2 | 0 | 0 | 0 | 1 | 0 | 2 | 0 | 1 | 6 |

==== Draw 3 ====
| Sheet B | 1 | 2 | 3 | 4 | 5 | 6 | 7 | 8 | 9 | 10 | Final |
|---|---|---|---|---|---|---|---|---|---|---|---|
| New Brunswick (McClure) 🔨 | 0 | 2 | 2 | 0 | 2 | 2 | X | X | X | X | 8 |
| British Columbia (Chilibeck) | 0 | 0 | 0 | 1 | 0 | 0 | X | X | X | X | 1 |

| Sheet D | 1 | 2 | 3 | 4 | 5 | 6 | 7 | 8 | 9 | 10 | Final |
|---|---|---|---|---|---|---|---|---|---|---|---|
| Nova Scotia (Doyle) 🔨 | 0 | 0 | 2 | 0 | 1 | 1 | 0 | 2 | 2 | X | 8 |
| Alberta (Saunders) | 0 | 1 | 0 | 1 | 0 | 0 | 1 | 0 | 0 | X | 3 |

| Sheet F | 1 | 2 | 3 | 4 | 5 | 6 | 7 | 8 | 9 | 10 | Final |
|---|---|---|---|---|---|---|---|---|---|---|---|
| Saskatchewan (Farough) 🔨 | 0 | 0 | 0 | 1 | 1 | 0 | 0 | 2 | 1 | 0 | 5 |
| Manitoba (Roy) | 0 | 0 | 1 | 0 | 0 | 1 | 0 | 0 | 0 | 0 | 2 |

| Sheet H | 1 | 2 | 3 | 4 | 5 | 6 | 7 | 8 | 9 | 10 | Final |
|---|---|---|---|---|---|---|---|---|---|---|---|
| Yukon (Baldwin) 🔨 | 1 | 0 | 0 | 0 | 2 | 2 | 0 | 0 | 2 | 0 | 7 |
| Ontario (Hanna) | 0 | 0 | 1 | 2 | 0 | 0 | 3 | 2 | 0 | 1 | 9 |

| Sheet J | 1 | 2 | 3 | 4 | 5 | 6 | 7 | 8 | 9 | 10 | Final |
|---|---|---|---|---|---|---|---|---|---|---|---|
| Quebec (Larouche) 🔨 | 0 | 0 | 1 | 0 | 0 | 1 | 0 | 0 | X | X | 2 |
| Northern Ontario (Uhryn) | 0 | 0 | 0 | 3 | 1 | 0 | 2 | 1 | X | X | 7 |

| Sheet L | 1 | 2 | 3 | 4 | 5 | 6 | 7 | 8 | 9 | 10 | Final |
|---|---|---|---|---|---|---|---|---|---|---|---|
| Northwest Territories (Koe) 🔨 | 0 | 0 | 2 | 2 | 0 | 2 | 1 | 2 | X | X | 9 |
| Newfoundland (Miller) | 0 | 1 | 0 | 0 | 2 | 0 | 0 | 0 | X | X | 3 |

==== Draw 4 ====
| Sheet A | 1 | 2 | 3 | 4 | 5 | 6 | 7 | 8 | 9 | 10 | Final |
|---|---|---|---|---|---|---|---|---|---|---|---|
| Manitoba (Roy) 🔨 | 3 | 3 | 0 | 3 | 1 | X | X | X | X | X | 10 |
| Northwest Territories (Koe) | 0 | 0 | 1 | 0 | 0 | X | X | X | X | X | 1 |

| Sheet C | 1 | 2 | 3 | 4 | 5 | 6 | 7 | 8 | 9 | 10 | 11 | 12 | Final |
| Northern Ontario (Uhryn) 🔨 | 2 | 0 | 0 | 0 | 1 | 0 | 0 | 1 | 0 | 2 | 0 | 0 | 6 |
| Yukon (Baldwin) | 0 | 0 | 0 | 3 | 0 | 1 | 1 | 0 | 1 | 0 | 0 | 1 | 7 |

| Sheet F | 1 | 2 | 3 | 4 | 5 | 6 | 7 | 8 | 9 | 10 | Final |
|---|---|---|---|---|---|---|---|---|---|---|---|
| Ontario (Hanna) 🔨 | 0 | 2 | 1 | 3 | 0 | 2 | X | X | X | X | 8 |
| Newfoundland (Miller) | 0 | 0 | 0 | 0 | 1 | 0 | X | X | X | X | 1 |

| Sheet G | 1 | 2 | 3 | 4 | 5 | 6 | 7 | 8 | 9 | 10 | Final |
|---|---|---|---|---|---|---|---|---|---|---|---|
| British Columbia (Chilibeck) 🔨 | 1 | 0 | 0 | 1 | 0 | 1 | 0 | 1 | 0 | X | 4 |
| Alberta (Saunders) | 0 | 0 | 1 | 0 | 3 | 0 | 3 | 0 | 6 | X | 13 |

| Sheet J | 1 | 2 | 3 | 4 | 5 | 6 | 7 | 8 | 9 | 10 | Final |
|---|---|---|---|---|---|---|---|---|---|---|---|
| Prince Edward Island (Gaudet) 🔨 | 0 | 0 | 1 | 0 | 0 | 1 | 0 | 0 | 2 | 0 | 4 |
| New Brunswick (McClure) | 0 | 0 | 0 | 2 | 1 | 0 | 0 | 2 | 0 | 0 | 5 |

| Sheet L | 1 | 2 | 3 | 4 | 5 | 6 | 7 | 8 | 9 | 10 | Final |
|---|---|---|---|---|---|---|---|---|---|---|---|
| Quebec (Larouche) 🔨 | 1 | 0 | 0 | 2 | 0 | 1 | 0 | 0 | 2 | 0 | 6 |
| Nova Scotia (Doyle) | 0 | 0 | 1 | 0 | 1 | 0 | 3 | 2 | 0 | 2 | 9 |

==== Draw 5 ====
| Sheet B | 1 | 2 | 3 | 4 | 5 | 6 | 7 | 8 | 9 | 10 | Final |
|---|---|---|---|---|---|---|---|---|---|---|---|
| Yukon (Baldwin) 🔨 | 1 | 0 | 1 | 3 | 1 | 2 | 0 | 1 | X | X | 9 |
| Nova Scotia (Doyle) | 0 | 1 | 0 | 0 | 0 | 0 | 2 | 0 | X | X | 3 |

| Sheet D | 1 | 2 | 3 | 4 | 5 | 6 | 7 | 8 | 9 | 10 | Final |
|---|---|---|---|---|---|---|---|---|---|---|---|
| Saskatchewan (Farough) 🔨 | 1 | 1 | 0 | 1 | 2 | 0 | 0 | 1 | 0 | 1 | 7 |
| Quebec (Larouche) | 0 | 0 | 2 | 0 | 0 | 1 | 1 | 0 | 2 | 0 | 6 |

| Sheet E | 1 | 2 | 3 | 4 | 5 | 6 | 7 | 8 | 9 | 10 | 11 | Final |
|---|---|---|---|---|---|---|---|---|---|---|---|---|
| Prince Edward Island (Gaudet) 🔨 | 0 | 1 | 0 | 0 | 0 | 0 | 1 | 2 | 0 | 1 | 0 | 5 |
| Northwest Territories (Koe) | 0 | 0 | 0 | 0 | 1 | 1 | 0 | 0 | 3 | 0 | 1 | 6 |

| Sheet H | 1 | 2 | 3 | 4 | 5 | 6 | 7 | 8 | 9 | 10 | Final |
|---|---|---|---|---|---|---|---|---|---|---|---|
| Northern Ontario (Uhryn) 🔨 | 1 | 1 | 1 | 0 | 0 | 1 | 0 | 1 | 1 | 1 | 7 |
| Manitoba (Roy) | 0 | 0 | 0 | 3 | 1 | 0 | 1 | 0 | 0 | 0 | 5 |

| Sheet J | 1 | 2 | 3 | 4 | 5 | 6 | 7 | 8 | 9 | 10 | Final |
|---|---|---|---|---|---|---|---|---|---|---|---|
| Newfoundland (Miller) 🔨 | 0 | 1 | 0 | 1 | 0 | 2 | 0 | 0 | 1 | X | 5 |
| Alberta (Saunders) | 0 | 0 | 1 | 0 | 3 | 0 | 1 | 2 | 0 | X | 7 |

| Sheet L | 1 | 2 | 3 | 4 | 5 | 6 | 7 | 8 | 9 | 10 | 11 | Final |
|---|---|---|---|---|---|---|---|---|---|---|---|---|
| New Brunswick (McClure) 🔨 | 1 | 0 | 0 | 1 | 0 | 0 | 0 | 0 | 0 | 2 | 0 | 4 |
| Ontario (Hanna) | 0 | 1 | 0 | 0 | 0 | 0 | 1 | 2 | 0 | 0 | 1 | 5 |

==== Draw 6 ====
| Sheet A | 1 | 2 | 3 | 4 | 5 | 6 | 7 | 8 | 9 | 10 | Final |
|---|---|---|---|---|---|---|---|---|---|---|---|
| Ontario (Hanna) 🔨 | 1 | 0 | 2 | 0 | 0 | 1 | 3 | 0 | 2 | X | 9 |
| British Columbia (Chilibeck) | 0 | 2 | 0 | 1 | 2 | 0 | 0 | 2 | 0 | X | 7 |

| Sheet D | 1 | 2 | 3 | 4 | 5 | 6 | 7 | 8 | 9 | 10 | Final |
|---|---|---|---|---|---|---|---|---|---|---|---|
| Northwest Territories (Koe) 🔨 | 1 | 0 | 1 | 0 | 1 | 0 | 0 | 2 | 0 | 0 | 5 |
| Northern Ontario (Uhryn) | 0 | 1 | 0 | 2 | 0 | 1 | 0 | 0 | 1 | 2 | 7 |

| Sheet E | 1 | 2 | 3 | 4 | 5 | 6 | 7 | 8 | 9 | 10 | Final |
|---|---|---|---|---|---|---|---|---|---|---|---|
| Manitoba (Roy) 🔨 | 1 | 0 | 2 | 0 | 0 | 0 | 0 | X | X | X | 3 |
| New Brunswick (McClure) | 0 | 2 | 0 | 2 | 2 | 2 | 1 | X | X | X | 9 |

| Sheet G | 1 | 2 | 3 | 4 | 5 | 6 | 7 | 8 | 9 | 10 | Final |
|---|---|---|---|---|---|---|---|---|---|---|---|
| Newfoundland (Miller) 🔨 | 0 | 0 | 2 | 0 | 2 | 0 | 0 | 2 | 0 | 2 | 8 |
| Yukon (Baldwin) | 0 | 0 | 0 | 0 | 0 | 1 | 2 | 0 | 2 | 0 | 5 |

| Sheet I | 1 | 2 | 3 | 4 | 5 | 6 | 7 | 8 | 9 | 10 | Final |
|---|---|---|---|---|---|---|---|---|---|---|---|
| Nova Scotia (Doyle) 🔨 | 1 | 1 | 0 | 2 | 1 | 0 | 2 | 1 | 0 | X | 8 |
| Saskatchewan (Farough) | 0 | 0 | 2 | 0 | 0 | 2 | 0 | 0 | 1 | X | 5 |

| Sheet L | 1 | 2 | 3 | 4 | 5 | 6 | 7 | 8 | 9 | 10 | 11 | Final |
|---|---|---|---|---|---|---|---|---|---|---|---|---|
| Alberta (Saunders) 🔨 | 1 | 0 | 3 | 0 | 0 | 0 | 3 | 0 | 1 | 0 | 0 | 8 |
| Prince Edward Island (Gaudet) | 0 | 2 | 0 | 0 | 2 | 2 | 0 | 1 | 0 | 1 | 1 | 9 |

==== Draw 7 ====
| Sheet B | 1 | 2 | 3 | 4 | 5 | 6 | 7 | 8 | 9 | 10 | Final |
|---|---|---|---|---|---|---|---|---|---|---|---|
| Saskatchewan (Farough) 🔨 | 0 | 1 | 0 | 3 | 0 | 0 | 0 | 1 | 0 | 3 | 8 |
| Alberta (Saunders) | 0 | 0 | 2 | 0 | 0 | 2 | 2 | 0 | 1 | 0 | 7 |

| Sheet D | 1 | 2 | 3 | 4 | 5 | 6 | 7 | 8 | 9 | 10 | Final |
|---|---|---|---|---|---|---|---|---|---|---|---|
| Ontario (Hanna) 🔨 | 1 | 0 | 0 | 0 | 0 | 1 | 0 | 2 | 0 | X | 4 |
| Prince Edward Island (Gaudet) | 0 | 0 | 3 | 0 | 0 | 0 | 1 | 0 | 2 | X | 6 |

| Sheet E | 1 | 2 | 3 | 4 | 5 | 6 | 7 | 8 | 9 | 10 | Final |
|---|---|---|---|---|---|---|---|---|---|---|---|
| Yukon (Baldwin) 🔨 | 0 | 0 | 0 | 2 | 0 | 1 | 0 | 0 | X | X | 3 |
| Quebec (Larouche) | 1 | 4 | 2 | 0 | 2 | 0 | 1 | 3 | X | X | 13 |

| Sheet H | 1 | 2 | 3 | 4 | 5 | 6 | 7 | 8 | 9 | 10 | Final |
|---|---|---|---|---|---|---|---|---|---|---|---|
| Nova Scotia (Doyle) 🔨 | 1 | 1 | 1 | 0 | 3 | 0 | 2 | 0 | 1 | X | 9 |
| Northwest Territories (Koe) | 0 | 0 | 0 | 1 | 0 | 2 | 0 | 1 | 0 | X | 4 |

| Sheet I | 1 | 2 | 3 | 4 | 5 | 6 | 7 | 8 | 9 | 10 | Final |
|---|---|---|---|---|---|---|---|---|---|---|---|
| New Brunswick (McClure) 🔨 | 2 | 0 | 0 | 1 | 0 | 3 | 0 | 0 | 0 | 1 | 7 |
| Northern Ontario (Uhryn) | 0 | 0 | 2 | 0 | 2 | 0 | 1 | 0 | 0 | 0 | 5 |

| Sheet L | 1 | 2 | 3 | 4 | 5 | 6 | 7 | 8 | 9 | 10 | Final |
|---|---|---|---|---|---|---|---|---|---|---|---|
| British Columbia (Chilibeck) 🔨 | 1 | 0 | 1 | 0 | 2 | 0 | 0 | 1 | 0 | 0 | 5 |
| Manitoba (Roy) | 0 | 0 | 0 | 2 | 0 | 2 | 1 | 0 | 0 | 1 | 6 |

==== Draw 8 ====
| Sheet A | 1 | 2 | 3 | 4 | 5 | 6 | 7 | 8 | 9 | 10 | Final |
|---|---|---|---|---|---|---|---|---|---|---|---|
| Prince Edward Island (Gaudet) 🔨 | 2 | 0 | 0 | 3 | 3 | 0 | 0 | 2 | 0 | X | 10 |
| Newfoundland (Miller) | 0 | 0 | 1 | 0 | 0 | 5 | 1 | 0 | 2 | X | 9 |

| Sheet C | 1 | 2 | 3 | 4 | 5 | 6 | 7 | 8 | 9 | 10 | Final |
|---|---|---|---|---|---|---|---|---|---|---|---|
| Quebec (Larouche) 🔨 | 0 | 1 | 3 | 0 | 4 | X | X | X | X | X | 8 |
| British Columbia (Chilibeck) | 0 | 0 | 0 | 1 | 0 | X | X | X | X | X | 1 |

| Sheet E | 1 | 2 | 3 | 4 | 5 | 6 | 7 | 8 | 9 | 10 | Final |
|---|---|---|---|---|---|---|---|---|---|---|---|
| Northern Ontario (Uhryn) 🔨 | 1 | 0 | 0 | 2 | 0 | 1 | 0 | 1 | 0 | 1 | 6 |
| Saskatchewan (Farough) | 0 | 0 | 2 | 0 | 1 | 0 | 0 | 0 | 2 | 0 | 5 |

| Sheet G | 1 | 2 | 3 | 4 | 5 | 6 | 7 | 8 | 9 | 10 | Final |
|---|---|---|---|---|---|---|---|---|---|---|---|
| Alberta (Saunders) 🔨 | 0 | 2 | 1 | 0 | 1 | 0 | 0 | 0 | 0 | 0 | 4 |
| Ontario (Hanna) | 1 | 0 | 0 | 1 | 0 | 1 | 1 | 1 | 0 | 1 | 6 |

| Sheet J | 1 | 2 | 3 | 4 | 5 | 6 | 7 | 8 | 9 | 10 | Final |
|---|---|---|---|---|---|---|---|---|---|---|---|
| Yukon (Baldwin) 🔨 | 0 | 3 | 0 | 2 | 3 | X | X | X | X | X | 8 |
| Manitoba (Roy) | 0 | 0 | 1 | 0 | 0 | X | X | X | X | X | 1 |

| Sheet K | 1 | 2 | 3 | 4 | 5 | 6 | 7 | 8 | 9 | 10 | Final |
|---|---|---|---|---|---|---|---|---|---|---|---|
| New Brunswick (McClure) 🔨 | 1 | 0 | 2 | 1 | 0 | 2 | 1 | 1 | X | X | 8 |
| Northwest Territories (Koe) | 0 | 1 | 0 | 0 | 1 | 0 | 0 | 0 | X | X | 2 |

==== Draw 9 ====
| Sheet A | 1 | 2 | 3 | 4 | 5 | 6 | 7 | 8 | 9 | 10 | Final |
|---|---|---|---|---|---|---|---|---|---|---|---|
| Quebec (Larouche) 🔨 | 1 | 0 | 0 | 0 | 0 | 0 | 0 | 1 | X | X | 2 |
| New Brunswick (McClure) | 0 | 0 | 2 | 0 | 1 | 2 | 2 | 0 | X | X | 7 |

| Sheet C | 1 | 2 | 3 | 4 | 5 | 6 | 7 | 8 | 9 | 10 | Final |
|---|---|---|---|---|---|---|---|---|---|---|---|
| Manitoba (Roy) 🔨 | 0 | 0 | 1 | 3 | 2 | 0 | 1 | 4 | X | X | 11 |
| Newfoundland (Miller) | 0 | 0 | 0 | 0 | 0 | 2 | 0 | 0 | X | X | 2 |

| Sheet F | 1 | 2 | 3 | 4 | 5 | 6 | 7 | 8 | 9 | 10 | Final |
|---|---|---|---|---|---|---|---|---|---|---|---|
| Prince Edward Island (Gaudet) 🔨 | 0 | 0 | 2 | 0 | 0 | 1 | 0 | 1 | 0 | 2 | 6 |
| Nova Scotia (Doyle) | 0 | 1 | 0 | 0 | 2 | 0 | 1 | 0 | 1 | 0 | 5 |

| Sheet H | 1 | 2 | 3 | 4 | 5 | 6 | 7 | 8 | 9 | 10 | 11 | Final |
|---|---|---|---|---|---|---|---|---|---|---|---|---|
| British Columbia (Chilibeck) 🔨 | 0 | 0 | 0 | 0 | 0 | 3 | 0 | 1 | 0 | 2 | 0 | 6 |
| Saskatchewan (Farough) | 0 | 1 | 1 | 0 | 1 | 0 | 2 | 0 | 1 | 0 | 1 | 7 |

| Sheet I | 1 | 2 | 3 | 4 | 5 | 6 | 7 | 8 | 9 | 10 | Final |
|---|---|---|---|---|---|---|---|---|---|---|---|
| Alberta (Saunders) 🔨 | 0 | 0 | 0 | 1 | 2 | 1 | 0 | 3 | X | X | 7 |
| Northwest Territories (Koe) | 0 | 0 | 0 | 0 | 0 | 0 | 1 | 0 | X | X | 1 |

| Sheet K | 1 | 2 | 3 | 4 | 5 | 6 | 7 | 8 | 9 | 10 | Final |
|---|---|---|---|---|---|---|---|---|---|---|---|
| Ontario (Hanna) 🔨 | 1 | 1 | 0 | 0 | 2 | 0 | 0 | 1 | 0 | 2 | 7 |
| Northern Ontario (Uhryn) | 0 | 0 | 1 | 1 | 0 | 2 | 1 | 0 | 0 | 0 | 5 |

==== Draw 10 ====
| Sheet B | 1 | 2 | 3 | 4 | 5 | 6 | 7 | 8 | 9 | 10 | Final |
|---|---|---|---|---|---|---|---|---|---|---|---|
| Nova Scotia (Doyle) 🔨 | 2 | 0 | 0 | 1 | 1 | 0 | 2 | 0 | 1 | X | 7 |
| British Columbia (Chilibeck) | 0 | 1 | 0 | 0 | 0 | 2 | 0 | 2 | 0 | X | 5 |

| Sheet C | 1 | 2 | 3 | 4 | 5 | 6 | 7 | 8 | 9 | 10 | Final |
|---|---|---|---|---|---|---|---|---|---|---|---|
| New Brunswick (McClure) 🔨 | 3 | 0 | 1 | 2 | 2 | 0 | 1 | X | X | X | 9 |
| Alberta (Saunders) | 0 | 1 | 0 | 0 | 0 | 1 | 0 | X | X | X | 2 |

| Sheet F | 1 | 2 | 3 | 4 | 5 | 6 | 7 | 8 | 9 | 10 | 11 | Final |
|---|---|---|---|---|---|---|---|---|---|---|---|---|
| Northwest Territories (Koe) 🔨 | 1 | 0 | 0 | 2 | 0 | 0 | 0 | 1 | 0 | 1 | 0 | 5 |
| Yukon (Baldwin) | 0 | 0 | 2 | 0 | 0 | 0 | 2 | 0 | 1 | 0 | 1 | 6 |

| Sheet H | 1 | 2 | 3 | 4 | 5 | 6 | 7 | 8 | 9 | 10 | Final |
|---|---|---|---|---|---|---|---|---|---|---|---|
| Newfoundland (Miller) 🔨 | 1 | 0 | 0 | 0 | 0 | 0 | 0 | X | X | X | 1 |
| Northern Ontario (Uhryn) | 0 | 0 | 0 | 3 | 2 | 2 | 1 | X | X | X | 8 |

| Sheet I | 1 | 2 | 3 | 4 | 5 | 6 | 7 | 8 | 9 | 10 | Final |
|---|---|---|---|---|---|---|---|---|---|---|---|
| Ontario (Hanna) 🔨 | 1 | 0 | 1 | 2 | 2 | X | X | X | X | X | 6 |
| Quebec (Larouche) | 0 | 0 | 0 | 0 | 0 | X | X | X | X | X | 0 |

| Sheet K | 1 | 2 | 3 | 4 | 5 | 6 | 7 | 8 | 9 | 10 | 11 | Final |
|---|---|---|---|---|---|---|---|---|---|---|---|---|
| Saskatchewan (Farough) 🔨 | 0 | 1 | 0 | 0 | 0 | 1 | 0 | 1 | 0 | 1 | 0 | 4 |
| Prince Edward Island (Gaudet) | 0 | 0 | 1 | 0 | 0 | 0 | 0 | 0 | 3 | 0 | 1 | 5 |

==== Draw 11 ====
| Sheet B | 1 | 2 | 3 | 4 | 5 | 6 | 7 | 8 | 9 | 10 | Final |
|---|---|---|---|---|---|---|---|---|---|---|---|
| Prince Edward Island (Gaudet) 🔨 | 1 | 1 | 0 | 0 | 1 | 0 | 1 | 0 | 0 | 0 | 4 |
| Manitoba (Roy) | 0 | 0 | 0 | 1 | 0 | 2 | 0 | 0 | 0 | 2 | 5 |

| Sheet C | 1 | 2 | 3 | 4 | 5 | 6 | 7 | 8 | 9 | 10 | 11 | Final |
|---|---|---|---|---|---|---|---|---|---|---|---|---|
| Northwest Territories (Koe) 🔨 | 0 | 0 | 0 | 0 | 0 | 1 | 0 | 1 | 0 | 1 | 0 | 3 |
| Ontario (Hanna) | 0 | 0 | 0 | 0 | 1 | 0 | 1 | 0 | 1 | 0 | 2 | 5 |

| Sheet F | 1 | 2 | 3 | 4 | 5 | 6 | 7 | 8 | 9 | 10 | Final |
|---|---|---|---|---|---|---|---|---|---|---|---|
| Newfoundland (Miller) 🔨 | 1 | 0 | 2 | 0 | 1 | 0 | 1 | 0 | 1 | X | 6 |
| Saskatchewan (Farough) | 0 | 0 | 0 | 2 | 0 | 3 | 0 | 3 | 0 | X | 8 |

| Sheet H | 1 | 2 | 3 | 4 | 5 | 6 | 7 | 8 | 9 | 10 | Final |
|---|---|---|---|---|---|---|---|---|---|---|---|
| Alberta (Saunders) 🔨 | 1 | 1 | 1 | 0 | 2 | 1 | 2 | X | X | X | 8 |
| Quebec (Larouche) | 0 | 0 | 0 | 2 | 0 | 0 | 0 | X | X | X | 2 |

| Sheet J | 1 | 2 | 3 | 4 | 5 | 6 | 7 | 8 | 9 | 10 | 11 | Final |
|---|---|---|---|---|---|---|---|---|---|---|---|---|
| Northern Ontario (Uhryn) 🔨 | 0 | 0 | 2 | 0 | 0 | 1 | 1 | 0 | 0 | 1 | 0 | 5 |
| Nova Scotia (Doyle) | 1 | 2 | 0 | 2 | 0 | 0 | 0 | 0 | 0 | 0 | 1 | 6 |

| Sheet K | 1 | 2 | 3 | 4 | 5 | 6 | 7 | 8 | 9 | 10 | Final |
|---|---|---|---|---|---|---|---|---|---|---|---|
| Yukon (Baldwin) 🔨 | 0 | 2 | 0 | 0 | 0 | 1 | 0 | 1 | 1 | 1 | 6 |
| British Columbia (Chilibeck) | 0 | 0 | 0 | 1 | 1 | 0 | 2 | 0 | 0 | 0 | 4 |

==== Draw 12 ====
| Sheet B | 1 | 2 | 3 | 4 | 5 | 6 | 7 | 8 | 9 | 10 | Final |
|---|---|---|---|---|---|---|---|---|---|---|---|
| New Brunswick (McClure) 🔨 | 1 | 0 | 3 | 1 | 0 | 2 | 4 | X | X | X | 11 |
| Newfoundland (Miller) | 0 | 1 | 0 | 0 | 1 | 0 | 0 | X | X | X | 2 |

| Sheet D | 1 | 2 | 3 | 4 | 5 | 6 | 7 | 8 | 9 | 10 | Final |
|---|---|---|---|---|---|---|---|---|---|---|---|
| Quebec (Larouche) 🔨 | 0 | 0 | 0 | 0 | 0 | 1 | 0 | 0 | 0 | X | 1 |
| Prince Edward Island (Gaudet) | 0 | 0 | 0 | 1 | 1 | 0 | 2 | 2 | 1 | X | 7 |

| Sheet F | 1 | 2 | 3 | 4 | 5 | 6 | 7 | 8 | 9 | 10 | Final |
|---|---|---|---|---|---|---|---|---|---|---|---|
| British Columbia (Chilibeck) 🔨 | 0 | 2 | 0 | 1 | 1 | 0 | 0 | 3 | 0 | 0 | 7 |
| Northern Ontario (Uhryn) | 0 | 0 | 1 | 0 | 0 | 3 | 1 | 0 | 2 | 1 | 8 |

| Sheet G | 1 | 2 | 3 | 4 | 5 | 6 | 7 | 8 | 9 | 10 | Final |
|---|---|---|---|---|---|---|---|---|---|---|---|
| Nova Scotia (Doyle) 🔨 | 0 | 0 | 2 | 0 | 0 | 0 | 2 | 1 | 0 | X | 5 |
| Ontario (Hanna) | 1 | 1 | 0 | 1 | 1 | 2 | 0 | 0 | 1 | X | 7 |

| Sheet J | 1 | 2 | 3 | 4 | 5 | 6 | 7 | 8 | 9 | 10 | Final |
|---|---|---|---|---|---|---|---|---|---|---|---|
| Saskatchewan (Farough) 🔨 | 1 | 1 | 1 | 0 | 3 | 0 | 3 | X | X | X | 9 |
| Yukon (Baldwin) | 0 | 0 | 0 | 1 | 0 | 1 | 0 | X | X | X | 2 |

| Sheet K | 1 | 2 | 3 | 4 | 5 | 6 | 7 | 8 | 9 | 10 | Final |
|---|---|---|---|---|---|---|---|---|---|---|---|
| Alberta (Saunders) 🔨 | 0 | 0 | 1 | 0 | 0 | 0 | 3 | 2 | 0 | X | 6 |
| Manitoba (Roy) | 0 | 0 | 0 | 1 | 1 | 0 | 0 | 0 | 0 | X | 2 |

==== Draw 13 ====
| Sheet A | 1 | 2 | 3 | 4 | 5 | 6 | 7 | 8 | 9 | 10 | 11 | Final |
|---|---|---|---|---|---|---|---|---|---|---|---|---|
| Ontario (Hanna) 🔨 | 3 | 0 | 1 | 0 | 0 | 1 | 0 | 0 | 1 | 0 | 1 | 7 |
| Saskatchewan (Farough) | 0 | 1 | 0 | 1 | 1 | 0 | 1 | 1 | 0 | 1 | 0 | 6 |

| Sheet D | 1 | 2 | 3 | 4 | 5 | 6 | 7 | 8 | 9 | 10 | Final |
|---|---|---|---|---|---|---|---|---|---|---|---|
| Yukon (Baldwin) 🔨 | 0 | 1 | 3 | 0 | 0 | 0 | 1 | 1 | 0 | 0 | 6 |
| New Brunswick (McClure) | 1 | 0 | 0 | 3 | 2 | 1 | 0 | 0 | 0 | 0 | 7 |

| Sheet E | 1 | 2 | 3 | 4 | 5 | 6 | 7 | 8 | 9 | 10 | Final |
|---|---|---|---|---|---|---|---|---|---|---|---|
| Manitoba (Roy) 🔨 | 1 | 0 | 1 | 0 | 2 | 1 | 0 | 0 | 0 | 0 | 5 |
| Nova Scotia (Doyle) | 0 | 1 | 0 | 1 | 0 | 0 | 3 | 0 | 0 | 1 | 6 |

| Sheet G | 1 | 2 | 3 | 4 | 5 | 6 | 7 | 8 | 9 | 10 | Final |
|---|---|---|---|---|---|---|---|---|---|---|---|
| Northern Ontario (Uhryn) 🔨 | 0 | 0 | 1 | 0 | 3 | 0 | 1 | 0 | 0 | 0 | 5 |
| Prince Edward Island (Gaudet) | 0 | 2 | 0 | 1 | 0 | 1 | 0 | 1 | 0 | 2 | 7 |

| Sheet J | 1 | 2 | 3 | 4 | 5 | 6 | 7 | 8 | 9 | 10 | Final |
|---|---|---|---|---|---|---|---|---|---|---|---|
| British Columbia (Chilibeck) 🔨 | 1 | 0 | 2 | 0 | 0 | 0 | 2 | 0 | 2 | 1 | 8 |
| Northwest Territories (Koe) | 0 | 2 | 0 | 2 | 1 | 0 | 0 | 1 | 0 | 0 | 6 |

| Sheet K | 1 | 2 | 3 | 4 | 5 | 6 | 7 | 8 | 9 | 10 | Final |
|---|---|---|---|---|---|---|---|---|---|---|---|
| Quebec (Larouche) 🔨 | 0 | 2 | 2 | 1 | 0 | 1 | 0 | 4 | X | X | 10 |
| Newfoundland and Labrador (Miller) | 0 | 0 | 0 | 0 | 1 | 0 | 1 | 0 | X | X | 2 |

=== Playoffs ===
| Semifinal | | Final |
| New Brunswick | 6 |
| Prince Edward Island | 4 | New Brunswick | 8 |
| | | Ontario | 4 |

==== Semifinal ====
| Sheet I | 1 | 2 | 3 | 4 | 5 | 6 | 7 | 8 | 9 | 10 | Final |
|---|---|---|---|---|---|---|---|---|---|---|---|
| New Brunswick (McClure) 🔨 | 0 | 1 | 1 | 0 | 0 | 0 | 1 | 0 | 0 | 3 | 6 |
| Prince Edward Island (Gaudet) | 1 | 0 | 0 | 2 | 0 | 0 | 0 | 0 | 1 | 0 | 4 |

Player percentages
| New Brunswick | | Prince Edward Island | |
|---|---|---|---|
| Bethany Toner | 73% | Jillian Waite | 71% |
| Brigitte McClure | 75% | Stephanie Pickett | 73% |
| Nancy Toner | 76% | Stefanie Richard | 60% |
| Melissa McClure | 78% | Suzanne Gaudet | 76% |
| Total | 75% | Total | 70% |

==== Final ====
| Sheet F | 1 | 2 | 3 | 4 | 5 | 6 | 7 | 8 | 9 | 10 | Final |
|---|---|---|---|---|---|---|---|---|---|---|---|
| New Brunswick (McClure) | 0 | 0 | 0 | 0 | 1 | 0 | 2 | 0 | 3 | 2 | 8 |
| Ontario (Hanna) 🔨 | 0 | 0 | 0 | 1 | 0 | 2 | 0 | 1 | 0 | 0 | 4 |

Player percentages
| New Brunswick | | Ontario | |
|---|---|---|---|
| Bethany Toner | 72% | Leesa Broder | 88% |
| Brigitte McClure | 84% | Julie Colquhoun | 75% |
| Nancy Toner | 78% | Amanda Vanderspank | 66% |
| Melissa McClure | 73% | Jenn Hanna | 67% |
| Total | 77% | Total | 74% |

== Qualification ==
=== Ontario ===
The Ontario Junior Curling Championships were held in Oshawa, with the finals on January 11.

After posting a 7-0 round robin record, the Ottawa Curling Club's Jenn Hanna rink had to be beaten twice by the Bluewater club's Susan Keeling for the women's championship. Hanna won the first game 11-2, clinching the championship.

In the men's final, John Morris (also of the Ottawa Curling Club) defeated Sarnia's Jason Young in the final. Morris had to win a tiebreaker match against Barrie's Ryan Werenich, before beating St. Catharines' Greg Balsdon in the semifinal to get there.
