= 2008 TSC Stores Tankard =

- Host city: Waterloo, Ontario
- Arena: Waterloo Memorial Recreation Complex
- Dates: February 4–10
- Winner: Team Howard
- Curling club: Coldwater & District CC, Coldwater
- Skip: Glenn Howard
- Third: Richard Hart
- Second: Brent Laing
- Lead: Craig Savill
- Finalist: Peter Corner

The 2008 TSC Stores Tankard, the Ontario men's curling championship, was held February 4–10 at the Waterloo Memorial Recreation Complex in Waterloo.

The event featured 11 teams, instead of the usual 10, since the Glenn Howard team was granted an automatic bye for having won the Brier the previous year.

Team Glenn Howard would repeat their third straight provincial championship, defeating 2000 champion Peter Corner in the final.

== Qualification ==
Qualification method	Berths	Qualifying team(s)
Brier champion	1	Glenn Howard
Region 1	2	Howard Rajala; Rob Dickson
Region 2	2	Bob Turcotte; Wayne Middaugh
Region 3	2	Peter Corner; Rob Lobel
Region 4	2	Rob Todd; Wayne Tuck Jr.
Challenge Round East	1	Mike Harris
Challenge Round West	1	Daryl Shane

== Teams ==
Skip	Third	Second	Lead
Peter Corner	John Base	Phil Loevenmark	Paul Moffatt
Rob Dickson	Ryan Rowe	Kyle Martin	Scott Dickson
John Epping	Mike Harris*	Collin Mitchell	Trevor Wall
Glenn Howard	Richard Hart	Brent Laing	Craig Savill
Rob Lobel	Steve Lobel	Scott Foster	Ken McDermott
Wayne Middaugh	Graeme McCarrel	Ian Tetley	Scott Bailey
Howard Rajala	Chris Fulton	Jeff Henderson	Craig Cordiner
Wayne Tuck, Jr.	Nick Rizzo*	Codey Maus	Jeff Wilson
Daryl Shane	Kevin Fanjoy	Dylan Tippin	Aaron Johnson
Rob Todd	Scott Banner	Chris De Cloet	Kevin Ackerman
Bob Turcotte	Dennis Noakes	Kevin Noakes	Kent Cochrane

* Skips, throws third rocks

== Standings ==
Skip	Club	Wins	Losses
Glenn Howard	Coldwater and District Curling Club	9	1
Peter Corner	Brampton Curling Club	8	2
Mike Harris	Tam Heather Curling Club	8	2
Rob Lobel	Brampton Curling Club	5	5
Wayne Middaugh	St. George's Golf and Country Club	5	5
Wayne Tuck, Jr.	Brantford Golf and Country Club	5	5
Howard Rajala	Rideau Curling Club	4	6
Bob Turcotte	Oshawa Golf and Country Club	4	6
Daryl Shane	Kitchener-Waterloo Granite Club	3	7
Rob Dickson	Land O'Lakes Curling Club	2	8
Rob Todd	Brant Curling Club	2	8

== Tie breakers ==
- Tuck 9-4 Middaugh
- Lobel 9-8 Tuck

== Playoffs ==
Page playoff system
1	Glenn Howard	4
2	Peter Corner	6
3	Mike Harris	8
4	Rob Lobel	7

Semifinal
1	Glenn Howard	7
3	Mike Harris	2

Final
2	Peter Corner	4
1	Glenn Howard	9

1 vs. 2

Team	1	2	3	4	5	6	7	8	9	10	Final
Glenn Howard (Coldwater & District) 🔨	1	0	0	0	1	0	0	2	0	0	4
Peter Corner (Brampton)	0	1	0	2	0	2	0	0	1	0	6

3 vs. 4

Team	1	2	3	4	5	6	7	8	9	10	Final
Rob Lobel (Brampton)	0	0	1	1	0	2	0	3	0	0	7
Mike Harris (Tam Heather) 🔨	2	1	0	0	1	0	0	0	2	2	8

Semifinal

Team	1	2	3	4	5	6	7	8	9	10	Final
Mike Harris (Tam Heather)	0	0	0	0	1	0	1	0	X	X	2
Glenn Howard (Coldwater & District) 🔨	3	0	0	1	0	2	0	1	X	X	7

Final

Team	1	2	3	4	5	6	7	8	9	10	Final
Peter Corner (Brampton)	0	2	0	1	0	1	X	X	X	X	4
Glenn Howard (Coldwater & District) 🔨	4	0	1	0	4	0	X	X	X	X	9
