= Ron Collins (curler) =

Canadian curler (1956–2016)

Ronald Stewart Collins, Jr. (May 4, 1956 – January 21, 2016) was a Canadian curler.

Collins represented Northern Ontario at the 1974 Canadian Junior Curling Championships and again at the 2002 Nokia Brier. At the Brier, he threw third stones for the Tim Phillips rink. There, the Northern Ontario team finished with a 5-6 round robin record, missing the playoffs. Collins curled 79% over the week, which was 7th among curlers at the third position.

== Personal life ==
Collins was a businessman by trade, founding and operating a number of bars in Sudbury, Ontario and also owned an Auto Outlet. Collins died at Health Sciences North in Sudbury at the age of 59. He had one child.
