= 2002 Nokia Brier =

- Host city: Calgary, Alberta
- Arena: Pengrowth Saddledome
- Dates: March 9–17
- Attendance: 245,296
- Winner: Alberta
- Curling club: Ottewell CC, Edmonton
- Skip: Randy Ferbey
- Fourth: David Nedohin
- Second: Scott Pfeifer
- Lead: Marcel Rocque
- Alternate: Dan Holowaychuk
- Coach: Brian Moore
- Finalist: Ontario (John Morris)

The 2002 Nokia Brier, the Canadian men's curling championship, was held from March 9 to 17 at the Pengrowth Saddledome in Calgary, Alberta. It was won by the Albertan foursome headed by Randy Ferbey. Ferbey threw third stones throughout the tournament while his mate (third) David Nedohin threw skip (or fourth) stones. The other two members of the team were second Scott Pfeifer and lead Marcel Rocque.

The Ferbey team beat the young Ontario foursome of John Morris, Joe Frans, Craig Savill, and Brent Laing by a score of 9–4. The game's pivotal moment came when Ferbey scored four points in the fifth end to break open an otherwise even and low-scoring game.

Third place in the tournament went to the team skipped by New Brunswick's Russ Howard, while fourth place was taken by Saskatchewan's Scott Bitz.

Absent from the event were many of the top teams in the country who had boycotted the Brier in favour of the Grand Slam of Curling series, protesting the lack of prize money.

== Teams ==
The teams were listed as follows:

Alberta	British Columbia	Manitoba	New Brunswick
Ottewell CC, Edmonton Fourth: David Nedohin; Skip: Randy Ferbey; Second: Scott Pfeifer; Lead: Marcel Rocque; Alternate: Dan Holowaychuk	Kelowna CC, Kelowna Skip: Pat Ryan; Third: Deane Horning; Second: Kevin MacKenzie; Lead: Rob Koffski; Alternate: Gerry Richard	Valour Road CC, Winnipeg Skip: Mark Lukowich; Third: Chris Suchy; Second: Dave Elias; Lead: Shane Kilgallen; Alternate: Greg McGibbon	Beaver CC, Moncton Skip: Russ Howard; Third: James Grattan; Second: Marc LeCocq; Lead: Grant Odishaw; Alternate: Terry Odishaw
Newfoundland and Labrador	Northern Ontario	Nova Scotia	Ontario
St. John's CC, St. John's Skip: Mark Noseworthy; Third: Bill Jenkins (Note: Team Newfoundland and Labrador alternate Toby McDonald threw third stones for the final two ends of Draw 15.); Second: Randy Turpin; Lead: Ian Kerr; Alternate: Toby McDonald	Sudbury CC, Sudbury Skip: Tim Phillips; Third: Ron Collins; Second: Drew Eloranta; Lead: Doug Hong; Alternate: Thomas Leonard	Bridgewater CC, Bridgewater Skip: Shawn Adams; Third: Craig Burgess; Second: Jeff Hopkins; Lead: Ben Blanchard; Alternate: Jason Blanchard	Stayner GC, Stayner Skip: John Morris; Third: Joe Frans; Second: Craig Savill; Lead: Brent Laing; Alternate: Jason Young
Prince Edward Island	Quebec	Saskatchewan	Yukon/Northwest Territories
Charlottetown CC, Charlottetown Skip: John Likely; Third: Robert Campbell; Second: Erik Brodersen; Lead: Jeff Smith (Note: Team Prince Edward Island alternate Mark Butler threw lead stones for the last end of Draw 13 and all of Draws 15 and 16.); Alternate: Mark Butler	CC Victoria, Sainte-Foy Skip: François Roberge; Third: Maxime Elmaleh; Second: Éric Sylvain (Note: Team Quebec alternate Jean-Michel Ménard threw second stones in Draw 15.); Lead: Jean Gagnon; Alternate: Jean-Michel Ménard	Caledonian CC, Regina Skip: Scott Bitz; Third: Mark Lang; Second: Brian McCusker; Lead: Kelly Moskowy; Alternate: Ron Pugsley	Whitehorse CC, Whitehorse Skip: Jonathan Solberg; Third: Wade Scoffin; Second: Ray Mikkelsen; Lead: Darol Stuart; Alternate: Curtis Prosko

== Map of teams ==
Provincial Winners

== Round Robin standings ==
Final Round Robin standings

Key
Teams to Playoffs

Locale	Skip	W	L	W–L	PF	PA	EW	EL	BE	SE	S%
Alberta	Randy Ferbey	9	2	–	82	53	43	36	3	8	84%
Ontario	John Morris	8	3	–	80	63	44	43	7	8	85%
Saskatchewan	Scott Bitz	7	4	1–0	68	63	48	45	6	13	83%
New Brunswick	Russ Howard	7	4	0–1	77	65	44	46	9	7	83%
British Columbia	Pat Ryan	6	5	1–1	69	64	46	39	9	13	81%
Manitoba	Mark Lukowich	6	5	1–1	74	79	47	48	5	10	79%
Nova Scotia	Shawn Adams	6	5	1–1	66	69	36	36	10	5	84%
Northern Ontario	Tim Phillips	5	6	–	57	70	43	44	13	9	78%
Newfoundland and Labrador	Mark Noseworthy	4	7	–	63	71	41	42	1	14	78%
Yukon/Northwest Territories	Jonathan Solberg	3	8	1–0	61	75	45	46	8	10	75%
Quebec	François Roberge	3	8	0–1	62	70	48	45	5	12	81%
Prince Edward Island	Jon Likely	2	9	–	55	72	42	47	0	7	77%

== Round robin results ==
All draw times are listed in Mountain Standard Time (UTC−7).

=== Draw 1 ===
Saturday, March 9, 1:00 pm

Sheet A	1	2	3	4	5	6	7	8	9	10	Final
New Brunswick (Howard)	0	0	0	2	4	0	4	X	X	X	10
Alberta (Ferbey) 🔨	1	0	0	0	0	1	0	X	X	X	2

Sheet B	1	2	3	4	5	6	7	8	9	10	11	Final
Manitoba (Lukowich) 🔨	2	0	3	0	0	2	0	2	0	0	1	10
Quebec (Roberge)	0	1	0	2	2	0	3	0	0	1	0	9

Sheet C	1	2	3	4	5	6	7	8	9	10	Final
Ontario (Morris) 🔨	0	2	0	2	2	0	0	1	0	1	8
British Columbia (Ryan)	0	0	2	0	0	0	1	0	1	0	4

Sheet D	1	2	3	4	5	6	7	8	9	10	Final
Nova Scotia (Adams) 🔨	1	0	0	2	0	1	0	0	4	X	8
Saskatchewan (Bitz)	0	1	0	0	1	0	1	1	0	X	4

=== Draw 2 ===
Saturday, March 9, 6:00 pm

Sheet A	1	2	3	4	5	6	7	8	9	10	Final
British Columbia (Ryan) 🔨	0	2	0	1	1	0	2	1	0	X	7
Manitoba (Lukowich)	2	0	1	0	0	1	0	0	0	X	4

Sheet B	1	2	3	4	5	6	7	8	9	10	Final
Prince Edward Island (Likely) 🔨	0	1	0	1	0	1	0	1	0	1	5
Yukon/Northwest Territories (Solberg)	1	0	1	0	1	0	2	0	1	0	6

Sheet C	1	2	3	4	5	6	7	8	9	10	Final
Northern Ontario (Phillips) 🔨	1	0	1	0	0	2	0	3	1	1	9
Newfoundland and Labrador (Noseworthy)	0	2	0	1	0	0	3	0	0	0	6

Sheet D	1	2	3	4	5	6	7	8	9	10	Final
Ontario (Morris) 🔨	0	1	0	3	0	0	0	4	0	X	8
Quebec (Roberge)	0	0	2	0	1	1	1	0	1	X	6

=== Draw 3 ===
Sunday, March 10, 8:30 am

Sheet B	1	2	3	4	5	6	7	8	9	10	Final
Saskatchewan (Bitz) 🔨	0	4	0	0	2	0	1	1	1	X	9
New Brunswick (Howard)	0	0	2	1	0	1	0	0	0	X	4

Sheet C	1	2	3	4	5	6	7	8	9	10	Final
Nova Scotia (Adams) 🔨	0	2	0	0	1	0	X	X	X	X	3
Alberta (Ferbey)	0	0	3	3	0	4	X	X	X	X	10

=== Draw 4 ===
Sunday, March 10, 1:00 pm

Sheet A	1	2	3	4	5	6	7	8	9	10	Final
Yukon/Northwest Territories (Solberg) 🔨	1	0	0	0	3	0	2	0	1	0	7
Northern Ontario (Phillips)	0	0	0	3	0	2	0	1	0	3	9

Sheet B	1	2	3	4	5	6	7	8	9	10	Final
Quebec (Roberge) 🔨	0	2	0	2	0	1	1	0	1	X	7
British Columbia (Ryan)	0	0	1	0	2	0	0	1	0	X	4

Sheet C	1	2	3	4	5	6	7	8	9	10	Final
Manitoba (Lukowich) 🔨	1	0	0	2	0	2	0	3	1	1	10
Ontario (Morris)	0	2	2	0	3	0	1	0	0	0	8

Sheet D	1	2	3	4	5	6	7	8	9	10	Final
Prince Edward Island (Likely) 🔨	2	0	1	0	1	0	1	0	2	1	8
Newfoundland and Labrador (Noseworthy)	0	1	0	1	0	2	0	1	0	0	5

=== Draw 5 ===
Sunday, March 10, 6:00 pm

Sheet A	1	2	3	4	5	6	7	8	9	10	Final
Alberta (Ferbey) 🔨	3	1	0	2	0	3	X	X	X	X	9
Saskatchewan (Bitz)	0	0	1	0	1	0	X	X	X	X	2

Sheet B	1	2	3	4	5	6	7	8	9	10	Final
Northern Ontario (Phillips) 🔨	0	0	2	0	0	1	1	1	0	1	6
Prince Edward Island (Likely)	0	0	0	3	0	0	0	0	2	0	5

Sheet C	1	2	3	4	5	6	7	8	9	10	Final
Newfoundland and Labrador (Noseworthy) 🔨	2	0	0	1	0	2	1	1	X	X	7
Yukon/Northwest Territories (Solberg)	0	0	1	0	0	0	0	0	X	X	1

Sheet D	1	2	3	4	5	6	7	8	9	10	11	Final
New Brunswick (Howard) 🔨	2	1	0	2	0	1	0	0	1	0	1	8
Nova Scotia (Adams)	0	0	1	0	2	0	2	0	0	2	0	7

=== Draw 6 ===
Monday, March 11, 8:30 am

Sheet A	1	2	3	4	5	6	7	8	9	10	Final
Nova Scotia (Adams) 🔨	1	0	1	0	0	0	1	1	0	X	4
Ontario (Morris)	0	2	0	2	2	0	0	0	2	X	8

Sheet B	1	2	3	4	5	6	7	8	9	10	Final
Saskatchewan (Bitz) 🔨	2	0	0	2	0	0	2	0	1	0	7
Manitoba (Lukowich)	0	2	1	0	1	1	0	1	0	2	8

Sheet C	1	2	3	4	5	6	7	8	9	10	Final
New Brunswick (Howard) 🔨	2	0	0	2	0	0	1	0	1	0	6
British Columbia (Ryan)	0	0	1	0	2	0	0	2	0	2	7

Sheet D	1	2	3	4	5	6	7	8	9	10	Final
Alberta (Ferbey) 🔨	2	0	0	1	1	0	2	0	0	1	7
Quebec (Roberge)	0	2	0	0	0	1	0	0	2	0	5

=== Draw 7 ===
Monday, March 11, 1:00 pm

Sheet A	1	2	3	4	5	6	7	8	9	10	Final
Manitoba (Lukowich) 🔨	0	0	0	0	1	2	0	2	0	X	5
Newfoundland and Labrador (Noseworthy)	0	1	2	4	0	0	1	0	2	X	10

Sheet B	1	2	3	4	5	6	7	8	9	10	Final
Ontario (Morris) 🔨	2	0	0	0	1	0	3	0	0	1	7
Yukon/Northwest Territories (Solberg)	0	0	0	1	0	3	0	0	1	0	5

Sheet C	1	2	3	4	5	6	7	8	9	10	Final
Quebec (Roberge) 🔨	0	1	0	0	1	0	0	0	1	1	4
Northern Ontario (Phillips)	2	0	0	1	0	0	0	2	0	0	5

Sheet D	1	2	3	4	5	6	7	8	9	10	Final
British Columbia (Ryan) 🔨	1	1	1	0	0	1	0	1	1	X	6
Prince Edward Island (Likely)	0	0	0	3	0	0	1	0	0	X	4

=== Draw 8 ===
Monday, March 11, 6:00 pm

Sheet A	1	2	3	4	5	6	7	8	9	10	Final
Prince Edward Island (Likely) 🔨	1	1	0	1	0	0	1	1	0	X	5
New Brunswick (Howard)	0	0	2	0	0	2	0	0	4	X	8

Sheet B	1	2	3	4	5	6	7	8	9	10	Final
Northern Ontario (Phillips) 🔨	1	0	1	0	0	1	0	2	0	X	5
Alberta (Ferbey)	0	2	0	2	0	0	1	0	2	X	7

Sheet C	1	2	3	4	5	6	7	8	9	10	Final
Yukon/Northwest Territories (Solberg) 🔨	1	0	2	1	0	1	0	1	0	X	6
Nova Scotia (Adams)	0	3	0	0	3	0	1	0	0	X	7

Sheet D	1	2	3	4	5	6	7	8	9	10	Final
Newfoundland and Labrador (Noseworthy) 🔨	0	2	0	0	1	0	1	0	X	X	4
Saskatchewan (Bitz)	1	0	2	1	0	3	0	2	X	X	9

=== Draw 9 ===
Tuesday, March 12, 8:30 am

Sheet A	1	2	3	4	5	6	7	8	9	10	Final
Yukon/Northwest Territories (Solberg) 🔨	1	1	0	1	0	0	1	0	0	X	4
Alberta (Ferbey)	0	0	1	0	2	1	0	2	2	X	8

Sheet B	1	2	3	4	5	6	7	8	9	10	Final
Newfoundland and Labrador (Noseworthy) 🔨	0	0	1	0	3	1	0	0	X	X	5
New Brunswick (Howard)	1	2	0	4	0	0	0	3	X	X	10

Sheet C	1	2	3	4	5	6	7	8	9	10	Final
Prince Edward Island (Likely) 🔨	1	0	1	0	1	0	1	0	1	X	5
Saskatchewan (Bitz)	0	2	0	0	0	0	0	1	0	X	3

Sheet D	1	2	3	4	5	6	7	8	9	10	Final
Northern Ontario (Phillips) 🔨	0	1	0	1	0	0	0	0	1	X	3
Nova Scotia (Adams)	0	0	0	0	2	0	1	2	0	X	5

=== Draw 10 ===
Tuesday, March 12, 1:00 pm

Sheet A	1	2	3	4	5	6	7	8	9	10	Final
Saskatchewan (Bitz) 🔨	0	1	0	1	1	0	1	1	1	X	6
Quebec (Roberge)	0	0	2	0	0	1	0	0	0	X	3

Sheet B	1	2	3	4	5	6	7	8	9	10	Final
Nova Scotia (Adams) 🔨	2	0	0	2	0	0	4	0	2	X	10
British Columbia (Ryan)	0	1	1	0	0	2	0	2	0	X	6

Sheet C	1	2	3	4	5	6	7	8	9	10	Final
Alberta (Ferbey) 🔨	0	1	0	2	0	3	0	3	X	X	9
Manitoba (Lukowich)	0	0	1	0	1	0	2	0	X	X	4

Sheet D	1	2	3	4	5	6	7	8	9	10	Final
New Brunswick (Howard) 🔨	1	0	2	0	1	0	1	0	1	0	6
Ontario (Morris)	0	3	0	1	0	2	0	0	0	1	7

=== Draw 11 ===
Tuesday, March 12, 6:00 pm

Sheet A	1	2	3	4	5	6	7	8	9	10	Final
British Columbia (Ryan) 🔨	1	0	0	2	3	1	1	X	X	X	8
Northern Ontario (Phillips)	0	1	0	0	0	0	0	X	X	X	1

Sheet B	1	2	3	4	5	6	7	8	9	10	Final
Quebec (Roberge) 🔨	2	0	1	0	1	1	0	1	1	1	8
Prince Edward Island (Likely)	0	3	0	1	0	0	3	0	0	0	7

Sheet C	1	2	3	4	5	6	7	8	9	10	Final
Ontario (Morris) 🔨	0	0	2	0	3	0	0	1	0	1	7
Newfoundland and Labrador (Noseworthy)	0	0	0	1	0	1	1	0	2	0	5

Sheet D	1	2	3	4	5	6	7	8	9	10	Final
Manitoba (Lukowich) 🔨	0	0	3	0	0	4	1	0	2	0	10
Yukon/Northwest Territories (Solberg)	2	4	0	1	1	0	0	2	0	1	11

=== Draw 12 ===
Wednesday, March 13, 8:30 am

Sheet A	1	2	3	4	5	6	7	8	9	10	Final
Ontario (Morris) 🔨	3	0	0	3	2	0	X	X	X	X	8
Prince Edward Island (Likely)	0	1	0	0	0	1	X	X	X	X	2

Sheet B	1	2	3	4	5	6	7	8	9	10	Final
Manitoba (Lukowich) 🔨	0	0	1	0	2	0	1	0	1	0	5
Northern Ontario (Phillips)	0	2	0	1	0	1	0	1	0	1	6

Sheet C	1	2	3	4	5	6	7	8	9	10	Final
British Columbia (Ryan) 🔨	0	0	1	0	3	0	0	1	0	0	5
Yukon/Northwest Territories (Solberg)	0	0	0	1	0	2	0	0	1	0	4

Sheet D	1	2	3	4	5	6	7	8	9	10	Final
Quebec (Roberge) 🔨	1	0	1	1	1	0	2	1	X	X	7
Newfoundland and Labrador (Noseworthy)	0	1	0	0	0	1	0	0	X	X	2

=== Draw 13 ===
Wednesday, March 13, 1:00 pm

Sheet A	1	2	3	4	5	6	7	8	9	10	Final
Newfoundland and Labrador (Noseworthy) 🔨	0	2	1	1	2	0	2	X	X	X	8
Nova Scotia (Adams)	2	0	0	0	0	0	0	X	X	X	2

Sheet B	1	2	3	4	5	6	7	8	9	10	Final
Yukon/Northwest Territories (Solberg) 🔨	0	1	0	0	0	2	0	0	1	0	4
Saskatchewan (Bitz)	0	0	0	1	1	0	1	1	0	1	5

Sheet C	1	2	3	4	5	6	7	8	9	10	Final
Northern Ontario (Phillips) 🔨	1	0	1	0	1	0	1	0	1	0	5
New Brunswick (Howard)	0	1	0	1	0	2	0	3	0	1	8

Sheet D	1	2	3	4	5	6	7	8	9	10	Final
Prince Edward Island (Likely) 🔨	0	1	0	0	1	0	1	0	X	X	3
Alberta (Ferbey)	1	0	2	3	0	1	0	2	X	X	9

=== Draw 14 ===
Wednesday, March 13, 6:00 pm

Sheet A	1	2	3	4	5	6	7	8	9	10	Final
New Brunswick (Howard) 🔨	0	0	0	0	0	1	0	1	0	X	2
Manitoba (Lukowich)	0	0	0	2	1	0	1	0	1	X	5

Sheet B	1	2	3	4	5	6	7	8	9	10	Final
Alberta (Ferbey) 🔨	0	2	0	0	0	2	0	5	X	X	9
Ontario (Morris)	0	0	0	1	1	0	1	0	X	X	3

Sheet C	1	2	3	4	5	6	7	8	9	10	Final
Nova Scotia (Adams) 🔨	4	0	0	1	0	0	2	1	X	X	8
Quebec (Roberge)	0	2	0	0	0	1	0	0	X	X	3

Sheet D	1	2	3	4	5	6	7	8	9	10	11	Final
Saskatchewan (Bitz) 🔨	0	0	0	2	0	2	0	1	0	1	2	8
British Columbia (Ryan)	1	1	1	0	1	0	1	0	1	0	0	6

=== Draw 15 ===
Thursday, March 14, 8:30 am

Sheet A	1	2	3	4	5	6	7	8	9	10	Final
Quebec (Roberge) 🔨	1	0	0	0	1	0	1	0	1	0	4
Yukon/Northwest Territories (Solberg)	0	1	1	1	0	1	0	1	0	1	6

Sheet B	1	2	3	4	5	6	7	8	9	10	Final
British Columbia (Ryan) 🔨	4	0	3	3	0	0	X	X	X	X	10
Newfoundland and Labrador (Noseworthy)	0	1	0	0	0	2	X	X	X	X	3

Sheet C	1	2	3	4	5	6	7	8	9	10	Final
Manitoba (Lukowich) 🔨	0	1	0	1	0	0	2	0	0	2	6
Prince Edward Island (Likely)	0	0	2	0	1	1	0	1	0	0	5

Sheet D	1	2	3	4	5	6	7	8	9	10	Final
Ontario (Morris) 🔨	1	1	1	1	0	2	0	3	X	X	9
Northern Ontario (Phillips)	0	0	0	0	2	0	1	0	X	X	3

=== Draw 16 ===
Thursday, March 14, 1:00 pm

Sheet A	1	2	3	4	5	6	7	8	9	10	11	Final
Northern Ontario (Phillips) 🔨	0	1	1	0	1	1	0	0	0	1	0	5
Saskatchewan (Bitz)	1	0	0	3	0	0	0	1	0	0	1	6

Sheet B	1	2	3	4	5	6	7	8	9	10	Final
Prince Edward Island (Likely) 🔨	1	0	1	0	2	0	0	1	0	1	6
Nova Scotia (Adams)	0	3	0	2	0	0	2	0	0	0	7

Sheet C	1	2	3	4	5	6	7	8	9	10	Final
Newfoundland and Labrador (Noseworthy) 🔨	0	1	1	0	2	0	1	3	X	X	8
Alberta (Ferbey)	1	0	0	1	0	1	0	0	X	X	3

Sheet D	1	2	3	4	5	6	7	8	9	10	11	Final
Yukon/Northwest Territories (Solberg) 🔨	2	0	0	2	1	0	0	1	1	0	0	7
New Brunswick (Howard)	0	4	0	0	0	2	0	0	0	1	1	8

=== Draw 17 ===
Thursday, March 14, 6:00 pm

Sheet A	1	2	3	4	5	6	7	8	9	10	Final
Alberta (Ferbey) 🔨	1	0	2	0	1	0	2	0	3	X	9
British Columbia (Ryan)	0	1	0	2	0	1	0	2	0	X	6

Sheet B	1	2	3	4	5	6	7	8	9	10	11	Final
New Brunswick (Howard) 🔨	1	0	1	0	2	0	0	2	0	0	1	7
Quebec (Roberge)	0	1	0	2	0	0	1	0	1	1	0	6

Sheet C	1	2	3	4	5	6	7	8	9	10	Final
Saskatchewan (Bitz) 🔨	1	1	0	2	0	3	0	1	0	1	9
Ontario (Morris)	0	0	2	0	2	0	2	0	1	0	7

Sheet D	1	2	3	4	5	6	7	8	9	10	Final
Nova Scotia (Adams) 🔨	0	1	0	0	2	0	1	0	1	0	5
Manitoba (Lukowich)	0	0	1	1	0	2	0	2	0	1	7

== Playoffs ==
Page playoffs
1	Alberta	7
2	Ontario	3
3	Saskatchewan	5
4	New Brunswick	7

Semifinal
2	Ontario	9
4	New Brunswick	5

Final
1	Alberta	9
2	Ontario	4

=== 3 vs. 4 ===
Friday, March 15, 1:00 pm

Sheet C	1	2	3	4	5	6	7	8	9	10	Final
Saskatchewan (Bitz) 🔨	1	0	1	0	1	0	1	0	1	0	5
New Brunswick (Howard)	0	2	0	1	0	2	0	1	0	1	7

Player percentages
Saskatchewan		New Brunswick	
Kelly Moskowy	88%	Grant Odishaw	83%
Brian McCusker	75%	Marc LeCocq	93%
Mark Lang	81%	James Grattan	88%
Scott Bitz	84%	Russ Howard	96%
Total	82%	Total	90%

=== 1 vs. 2 ===
Friday, March 15, 6:00 pm

Sheet C	1	2	3	4	5	6	7	8	9	10	Final
Alberta (Ferbey) 🔨	2	1	0	0	1	0	0	2	1	X	7
Ontario (Morris)	0	0	1	0	0	0	2	0	0	X	3

Player percentages
Alberta		Ontario	
Marcel Rocque	92%	Brent Laing	88%
Scott Pfeifer	93%	Craig Savill	81%
Randy Ferbey	88%	Joe Frans	81%
David Nedohin	92%	John Morris	69%
Total	91%	Total	80%

=== Semifinal ===
Saturday, March 16, 11:30 am

Sheet C	1	2	3	4	5	6	7	8	9	10	Final
Ontario (Morris) 🔨	2	0	3	0	0	2	0	1	1	X	9
New Brunswick (Howard)	0	1	0	2	0	0	2	0	0	X	5

Player percentages
Ontario		New Brunswick	
Brent Laing	87%	Grant Odishaw	81%
Craig Savill	93%	Marc LeCocq	81%
Joe Frans	88%	James Grattan	75%
John Morris	85%	Russ Howard	86%
Total	88%	Total	81%

=== Final ===
Sunday, March 17, 11:30 am

Sheet C	1	2	3	4	5	6	7	8	9	10	Final
Alberta (Ferbey) 🔨	2	0	1	0	4	1	0	0	1	X	9
Ontario (Morris)	0	1	0	1	0	0	1	1	0	X	4

Player percentages
Alberta		Ontario	
Marcel Rocque	94%	Brent Laing	89%
Scott Pfeifer	83%	Craig Savill	92%
Randy Ferbey	94%	Joe Frans	88%
David Nedohin	89%	John Morris	82%
Total	90%	Total	88%

== Statistics ==
=== Top 5 player percentages ===
Round robin only

Key
First All-Star Team
Second All-Star Team

Leads	%
(Saskatchewan) Kelly Moskowy	90
(New Brunswick) Grant Odishaw	89
(Alberta) Marcel Rocque	88
(Nova Scotia) Ben Blanchard	87
(Quebec) Jean Gagnon	87

Seconds	%
(Alberta) Scott Pfeifer	86
(Ontario) Craig Savill	85
(New Brunswick) Marc LeCocq	85
(Saskatchewan) Brian McCusker	84
(Nova Scotia) Jeff Hopkins	84
(Manitoba) Dave Elias	84

Thirds	%
(Ontario) Joe Frans	86
(Nova Scotia) Craig Burgess	84
(Alberta) Randy Ferbey	83
(British Columbia) Deane Horning	82
(Saskatchewan) Mark Lang	81

Skips	%
(Ontario) John Morris	85
(Alberta) David Nedohin	81
(New Brunswick) Russ Howard	80
(British Columbia) Pat Ryan	80
(Nova Scotia) Shawn Adams	79

== Awards ==
=== All-Star teams ===
The All-Star Teams were as follows:

First Team
Position	Name	Team
Skip	David Nedohin (Fourth)	Alberta
Third	Joe Frans	Ontario
Second	Scott Pfeifer	Alberta
Lead	Kelly Moskowy	Saskatchewan

Second Team
Position	Name	Team
Skip	John Morris	Ontario
Third	Randy Ferbey (Skip)	Alberta
Second	Craig Savill	Ontario
Lead	Marcel Rocque	Alberta

=== Ross Harstone Sportsmanship Award ===
The Ross Harstone Sportsmanship Award is presented to the player chosen by their fellow peers as the curler who best represented Harstone's high ideals of good sportsmanship, observance of the rules, exemplary conduct and curling ability.

Name	Position	Team
Mark Lang	Third	Saskatchewan

=== Hec Gervais Most Valuable Player Award ===
The Hec Gervais Most Valuable Player Award was awarded to the top player in the playoff round by members of the media.

Name	Position	Team
David Nedohin (2)	Fourth	Alberta
