= 2013 Boston Pizza Cup =

- Host city: Leduc, Alberta
- Arena: Leduc Recreation Centre
- Dates: February 6–10
- Winner: Kevin Martin
- Curling club: Saville SC, Edmonton
- Skip: Kevin Martin
- Third: John Morris
- Second: Marc Kennedy
- Lead: Ben Hebert
- Finalist: Kevin Koe

The 2013 Alberta Boston Pizza Cup, the men's provincial curling championship for Alberta, was held from February 6 to 10 at the Leduc Recreation Centre in Leduc, Alberta. The winner of the Boston Pizza Cup represented Alberta at the 2013 Tim Hortons Brier in Edmonton.

== Qualification process ==
Twelve teams qualified for the provincial tournament through several methods. The qualification process is as follows:

Qualification method	Berths	Qualifying team
Defending champion from previous year	1	Kevin Koe
Highest-ranked team on CTRS not already qualified	1	Kevin Martin
Alberta Curling Federation bonspiel points	2	Brendan Bottcher; Jamie King
Peace Curling Association qualifier (Jan. 4–6)	2	Kurt Balderston; Graham Powell
Northern Alberta Curling Association qualifier (Jan. 17–20)	3	Tom Appelman; Wade White; James Pahl
Southern Alberta Curling Association qualifier (Jan. 18–21)	3	Charley Thomas; Matthew Blandford; Aaron Sluchinski

== Teams ==
The teams are listed as follows:

Skip	Third	Second	Lead	Alternate	Locale(s)
Brendan Bottcher	Micky Lizmore	Bradley Thiessen	Karrick Martin		Saville Sports Centre, Edmonton
Jamie King	Blake MacDonald	Scott Pfeifer	Jeff Erickson		St. Albert Curling Club, St. Albert
Kevin Koe	Pat Simmons	Carter Rycroft	Nolan Thiessen		Glencoe Curling Club, Calgary
Kevin Martin	John Morris	Marc Kennedy	Ben Hebert		Saville Sports Centre, Edmonton
Kurt Balderston	Adam Enright	Rob Maksymetz	Del Shaughnessy		Sexsmith Curling Club, Sexsmith
Graham Powell	Kelsey Dusseault	Ken Powell	Alain Blanchette		Sexsmith Curling Club, Sexsmith
Brent Bawel	Tom Appelman	Ted Appelman	Brendan Melnyk		Saville Sports Centre, Edmonton
Wade White	Kevin Tym	Dan Holowaychuk	George White	Brian McPherson	Saville Sports Centre, Edmonton
James Pahl	Mark Klinck	Kevin McGregor	Kelly Mauthe		Strathcona Curling Club, Sherwood Park
Charley Thomas	J. D. Lind	Dominic Daeman	Matt Ng		Calgary Curling Club, Calgary; Glencoe Curling Club, Calgary
Matthew Blandford	Evan Assmussen	Brent Hamilton	Bradley Chyz	Greg Hill	Inglewood Curling Club, Calgary
Aaron Sluchinski	Justin Sluchinski	Dylan Webster	Craig Bourgonje	Steve Petryk	Airdrie Curling Club, Airdrie

== Knockout Draw Brackets ==
The draw is listed as follows:

=== A event ===
First Knockout
Wade White	5
Matthew Blandford	8
Brent Bawel	8
Graham Powell	4
Charley Thomas	9
Aaron Sluchinski	3
Kurt Balderston	5
James Pahl	7

Quarterfinals
Kevin Koe	14
Matthew Blandford	0
Brent Bawel	10
Brendan Bottcher	8
Jamie King	7
Charley Thomas	4
James Pahl	4
Kevin Martin	8

Semifinals
Kevin Koe	5
Brent Bawel	2
Jamie King	6
Kevin Martin	7

Qualifier 1
Kevin Koe	5
Kevin Martin	6

=== B event ===
Second Knockout
Brendan Bottcher	3
Wade White	12
Charley Thomas	11
Graham Powell	1
Aaron Sluchinski	6
James Pahl	4
Kurt Balderston	9
Matthew Blandford	3

Quarterfinals
Wade White	4
Jamie King	9
Charley Thomas	8
Brent Bawel	6
Aaron Sluchinski	8
Kurt Balderston	5

Semifinals
Jamie King	7
Charley Thomas	9
Aaron Sluchinski	10
Kevin Koe	7

Qualifier 2
Charley Thomas	5
Aaron Sluchinski	6

=== C event ===
Third Knockout		Semifinals		Qualifier 3
		Kevin Koe	9
Brendan Bottcher	7	Brendan Bottcher	3
Graham Powell	4			Kevin Koe	8
				Jamie King	7
		Kurt Balderston	3
		Jamie King	8

Third Knockout		Semifinals		Qualifier 4
Wade White	5
James Pahl	8	James Pahl	2
Brent Bawel	9	Brent Bawel	7
Matthew Blandford	8			Brent Bawel	1
				Charley Thomas	6

== Knockout results ==
All draws are listed in Mountain Standard Time (UTC−7).

=== Draw 1 ===
Wednesday, February 6, 9:30 am

Sheet A	1	2	3	4	5	6	7	8	9	10	Final
Charley Thomas 🔨	3	1	1	0	0	4	X	X	X	X	9
Aaron Sluchinski	0	0	0	1	2	0	X	X	X	X	3

Sheet B	1	2	3	4	5	6	7	8	9	10	Final
Brent Bawel 🔨	3	1	0	1	0	1	0	0	2	X	8
Graham Powell	0	0	1	0	1	0	1	1	0	X	4

Sheet C	1	2	3	4	5	6	7	8	9	10	Final
Wade White 🔨	0	1	0	1	0	1	1	0	1	X	5
Matthew Blandford	1	0	2	0	2	0	0	3	0	X	8

Sheet D	1	2	3	4	5	6	7	8	9	10	Final
Kurt Balderston	0	2	0	2	0	1	0	0	0	X	5
James Pahl 🔨	2	0	1	0	0	0	0	0	4	X	7

=== Draw 2 ===
Wednesday, February 6, 6:30 pm

Sheet A	1	2	3	4	5	6	7	8	9	10	11	Final
Brent Bawel 🔨	0	1	2	0	1	0	0	2	1	1	2	10
Brendan Bottcher	2	0	0	3	0	1	2	0	0	0	0	8

Sheet B	1	2	3	4	5	6	7	8	9	10	Final
Kevin Koe 🔨	3	3	4	1	2	1	X	X	X	X	14
Matthew Blandford	0	0	0	0	0	0	X	X	X	X	0

Sheet C	1	2	3	4	5	6	7	8	9	10	Final
James Pahl 🔨	0	1	0	1	0	0	0	2	0	X	4
Kevin Martin	2	0	1	0	1	1	0	0	3	X	8

Sheet D	1	2	3	4	5	6	7	8	9	10	Final
Jamie King	1	0	2	0	1	0	1	0	2	X	7
Charley Thomas 🔨	0	1	0	1	0	1	0	1	0	X	4

=== Draw 3 ===
Thursday, February 7, 9:00 am

Sheet B	1	2	3	4	5	6	7	8	9	10	11	Final
Jamie King 🔨	1	1	0	1	1	0	1	0	1	0	0	6
Kevin Martin	0	0	1	0	0	2	0	2	0	1	1	7

Sheet D	1	2	3	4	5	6	7	8	9	10	Final
Kevin Koe 🔨	1	1	0	1	0	0	2	0	X	X	5
Brent Bawel	0	0	0	0	0	1	0	1	X	X	2

=== Draw 4 ===
Thursday, February 7, 2:00 pm

Sheet A	1	2	3	4	5	6	7	8	9	10	Final
Kurt Balderston 🔨	0	1	0	4	0	2	2	X	X	X	9
Matthew Blandford	0	0	2	0	1	0	0	X	X	X	3

Sheet B	1	2	3	4	5	6	7	8	9	10	Final
Aaron Sluchinski	0	0	0	0	2	0	1	0	1	2	6
James Pahl 🔨	0	0	0	2	0	1	0	1	0	0	4

Sheet C	1	2	3	4	5	6	7	8	9	10	Final
Charley Thomas	3	3	2	3	0	0	X	X	X	X	11
Graham Powell 🔨	0	0	0	0	0	1	X	X	X	X	1

Sheet D	1	2	3	4	5	6	7	8	9	10	Final
Wade White 🔨	2	0	4	6	0	0	X	X	X	X	12
Brendan Bottcher	0	1	0	0	1	1	X	X	X	X	3

=== Draw 5 ===
Thursday, February 7, 6:30 pm

Sheet A	1	2	3	4	5	6	7	8	9	10	Final
Kevin Koe 🔨	0	1	1	0	1	0	0	0	2	0	5
Kevin Martin	0	0	0	2	0	1	1	1	0	1	6

Sheet B	1	2	3	4	5	6	7	8	9	10	Final
Brent Bawel 🔨	1	0	0	2	0	2	0	0	1	0	6
Charley Thomas	0	0	2	0	2	0	2	1	0	1	8

Sheet C	1	2	3	4	5	6	7	8	9	10	Final
Jamie King 🔨	3	1	1	0	4	0	X	X	X	X	9
Wade White	0	0	0	2	0	2	X	X	X	X	4

Sheet D	1	2	3	4	5	6	7	8	9	10	Final
Kurt Balderston	1	0	2	2	0	0	0	0	0	0	5
Aaron Sluchinski 🔨	0	1	0	0	2	2	1	0	1	1	8

=== Draw 6 ===
Friday, February 8, 9:00 am

Sheet A	1	2	3	4	5	6	7	8	9	10	Final
Graham Powell	0	0	0	2	0	1	0	0	1	0	4
Brendan Bottcher 🔨	2	0	1	0	1	0	1	1	0	1	7

Sheet C	1	2	3	4	5	6	7	8	9	10	Final
Matthew Blandford	0	1	0	3	0	2	0	0	2	0	8
Brent Bawel 🔨	1	0	2	0	3	0	0	2	0	1	9

Sheet D	1	2	3	4	5	6	7	8	9	10	Final
James Pahl	0	2	1	1	0	1	1	0	2	X	8
Wade White 🔨	2	0	0	0	2	0	0	1	0	X	5

=== Draw 7 ===
Friday, February 8, 2:00 pm

Sheet B	1	2	3	4	5	6	7	8	9	10	Final
Aaron Sluchinski 🔨	4	0	2	0	0	0	1	0	3	X	10
Kevin Koe	0	2	0	1	1	2	0	1	0	X	7

Sheet D	1	2	3	4	5	6	7	8	9	10	Final
Jamie King 🔨	0	2	0	1	0	3	0	0	1	0	7
Charley Thomas	2	0	1	0	2	0	2	1	0	1	9

=== Draw 8 ===
Friday, February 8, 6:30 pm

Sheet A	1	2	3	4	5	6	7	8	9	10	Final
Kurt Balderston	0	1	0	1	0	0	1	0	X	X	3
Jamie King 🔨	1	0	1	0	2	3	0	1	X	X	8

Sheet B	1	2	3	4	5	6	7	8	9	10	Final
Brendan Bottcher	0	2	0	0	0	1	0	0	X	X	3
Kevin Koe 🔨	3	0	0	0	2	0	3	1	X	X	9

Sheet C	1	2	3	4	5	6	7	8	9	10	Final
James Pahl	0	1	0	0	1	0	X	X	X	X	2
Brent Bawel 🔨	2	0	2	1	0	2	X	X	X	X	7

Sheet D	1	2	3	4	5	6	7	8	9	10	11	Final
Charley Thomas 🔨	0	1	0	0	0	2	0	1	0	1	0	5
Aaron Sluchinski	0	0	1	1	0	0	1	0	2	0	1	6

=== Draw 9 ===
Saturday, February 9, 1:00 pm

Sheet C	1	2	3	4	5	6	7	8	9	10	Final
Kevin Koe 🔨	2	2	0	0	2	0	0	1	0	1	8
Jamie King	0	0	1	1	0	2	0	0	3	0	7

Sheet D	1	2	3	4	5	6	7	8	9	10	Final
Brent Bawel 🔨	0	0	0	1	0	0	0	0	X	X	1
Charley Thomas	1	1	0	0	1	2	0	1	X	X	6

== Playoffs ==
Page playoff system
1	Kevin Martin	7
2	Aaron Sluchinski	3
3	Kevin Koe	11
4	Charley Thomas	3

Semifinal
2	Aaron Sluchinski	2
3	Kevin Koe	6

Final
1	Kevin Martin	5
3	Kevin Koe	4

=== 1 vs. 2 ===
Saturday, February 9, 6:30 pm

Sheet C	1	2	3	4	5	6	7	8	9	10	Final
Kevin Martin 🔨	2	0	1	0	2	2	0	0	X	X	7
Aaron Sluchinski	0	1	0	2	0	0	0	0	X	X	3

=== 3 vs. 4 ===
Saturday, February 9, 6:30 pm

Sheet A	1	2	3	4	5	6	7	8	9	10	Final
Kevin Koe 🔨	1	2	0	5	0	3	X	X	X	X	11
Charley Thomas	0	0	1	0	2	0	X	X	X	X	3

=== Semifinal ===
Sunday, February 10, 9:30 am

Sheet B	1	2	3	4	5	6	7	8	9	10	Final
Aaron Sluchinski 🔨	0	0	1	1	0	0	0	0	X	X	2
Kevin Koe	1	2	0	0	1	1	0	1	X	X	6

=== Final ===
Sunday, February 10, 2:00 pm

Sheet C	1	2	3	4	5	6	7	8	9	10	11	Final
Kevin Martin 🔨	0	1	0	1	0	0	1	1	0	0	1	5
Kevin Koe	0	0	1	0	1	1	0	0	0	1	0	4
