= 2012 Boston Pizza Cup =

- Host city: Camrose, Alberta
- Arena: Encana Arena
- Dates: February 8–12
- Winner: Kevin Koe
- Curling club: Glencoe Curling Club, Calgary
- Skip: Kevin Koe
- Third: Pat Simmons
- Second: Carter Rycroft
- Lead: Nolan Thiessen
- Finalist: Brock Virtue

The 2012 Boston Pizza Cup was held from February 8 to 12 at the Encana Arena in the Edgeworth Centre in Camrose, Alberta. The winning team of Kevin Koe represented Alberta at the 2012 Tim Hortons Brier in Saskatoon, Saskatchewan.

== Teams ==
Skip	Third	Second	Lead	Alternate	Club(s)	Qualification method
Warren Hassall (fourth)	Jamie King (skip)	Todd Brick	Sean Morris		Saville Sports Centre; Calgary Curling Club	Alberta Curling Federation bonspiel points
Kevin Koe	Pat Simmons	Carter Rycroft	Nolan Thiessen	Blake MacDonald	Glencoe Curling Club	Alberta's highest ranked team from the Canadian Team Ranking System
Kevin Martin	John Morris	Marc Kennedy	Ben Hebert		Saville Sports Centre	Defending champion
Brock Virtue	J. D. Lind	Dominic Daemen	Matthew Ng		Calgary Curling Club	Alberta Curling Federation bonspiel points
Kurt Balderston	Les Sonnenberg	Rob Maksymetz	Del Shaughnessy		Sexsmith Curling Club	A Qualifier - Peace Curling Association
Tom Sallows (fourth)	Stacy Coomber	Brent Hamilton	Greg Hill (skip)	Steve Petryk	Grande Prairie Curling Club	B Qualifier - Peace Curling Association
Robert Schlender	Colin Hodgson	Justin Sluchinski	Chris Lemishka		Saville Sports Centre	A Qualifier - Northern Alberta Curling Association
Tom Appelman	Adam Enright	Brandon Klassen	Nathan Connolly	Ted Appelman	Saville Sports Centre	B Qualifier - Northern Alberta Curling Association
Kevin Park	Shane Park	Aaron Sluchinski	Eric Richard	Kerry Park	Shamrock Curling Club	C Qualifier - Northern Alberta Curling Association
Dean Ross	Don DeLair	Chris Blackwell	Stephen Jensen		North Hill Curling Club; Airdrie Curling Club; Calgary Curling Club	A Qualifier - Southern Alberta Curling Association
Matthew Blandford	Mike Libbus	Brad MacInnis	Peter Keenan	Mickey Pendergast	Oilfields Curling Club	B Qualifier - Southern Alberta Curling Association
Lloyd Hill	Scott Egger	Steve Thomas	Ed Chow		Brooks Curling Club; Calgary Curling Club	C Qualifier - Southern Alberta Curling Association

== Draw Brackets ==
=== A Event ===
Round of 16
Kurt Balderston	8
Dean Ross	6
Robert Schlender	7
Greg Hill	5
6	Kevin Park	8
11	Lloyd Hill	3
7	Tom Appelman	6
10	Matthew Blandford	5

Quarterfinals
1	Kevin Martin	4
8	Kurt Balderston	2
4	Brock Virtue	8
5	Robert Schlender	1
3	Jamie King	8
6	Kevin Park	7
2	Kevin Koe	9
7	Tom Appelman	3

Semifinals
1	Kevin Martin	8
4	Brock Virtue	2
3	Jamie King	4
2	Kevin Koe	7

A Qualifier
1	Kevin Martin	5
2	Kevin Koe	6

=== B Event ===
Round of 16
Dean Ross	3
Robert Schlender	8
Kevin Park	7
Greg Hill	8
11	Lloyd Hill	7
7	Tom Appelman	10
10	Matthew Blandford	2
8	Kurt Balderston	8

Quarterfinals
5	Robert Schlender	8
3	Jamie King	7
12	Greg Hill	3
4	Brock Virtue	6
7	Tom Appelman	5
8	Kurt Balderston	4

Semifinals
5	Robert Schlender	5
4	Brock Virtue	12
7	Tom Appelman	2
1	Kevin Martin	7

B Qualifier
4	Brock Virtue	7
1	Kevin Martin	4

=== C Event ===
Quarterfinals			Semifinals			C Qualifier 1
			7	Tom Appelman	4
9	Dean Ross	2	6	Kevin Park	7
6	Kevin Park	8				6	Kevin Park	5
						5	Robert Schlender	8
			8	Kurt Balderston	5
			5	Robert Schlender	9

Quarterfinals			Semifinals			C Qualifier 2
11	Lloyd Hill	8
3	Jamie King	4	11	Lloyd Hill	5
10	Matthew Blandford	5	12	Greg Hill	6
12	Greg Hill	7				12	Greg Hill	2
						1	Kevin Martin	6

== Results ==
All times listed in Mountain Standard Time.

=== Draw 1 ===
Wednesday, February 8, 9:30am

Sheet A	1	2	3	4	5	6	7	8	9	10	Final
Kevin Park	2	0	0	1	1	0	3	0	1	X	8
Lloyd Hill	0	1	0	0	0	1	0	1	0	X	3

Sheet B	1	2	3	4	5	6	7	8	9	10	Final
Robert Schlender	0	2	0	2	1	0	1	0	1	X	7
Greg Hill	2	0	2	0	0	1	0	0	0	X	5

Sheet C	1	2	3	4	5	6	7	8	9	10	Final
Kurt Balderston	0	3	0	0	2	2	0	1	0	X	8
Dean Ross	0	0	1	1	0	0	2	0	2	X	6

Sheet D	1	2	3	4	5	6	7	8	9	10	Final
Tom Appelman	1	0	0	0	2	0	0	1	2	0	6
Matthew Blandford	0	3	1	0	0	0	0	0	0	1	5

=== Draw 2 ===
Wednesday, February 8, 6:30pm

Sheet A	1	2	3	4	5	6	7	8	9	10	Final
Brock Virtue	0	1	2	1	3	1	X	X	X	X	8
Robert Schlender	1	0	0	0	0	0	X	X	X	X	1

Sheet B	1	2	3	4	5	6	7	8	9	10	Final
Kevin Martin	0	2	0	1	0	0	0	0	0	1	4
Kurt Balderston	1	0	0	0	0	0	0	0	1	0	2

Sheet C	1	2	3	4	5	6	7	8	9	10	Final
Kevin Koe	2	0	1	0	0	3	0	3	X	X	9
Tom Appelman	0	0	0	0	1	0	2	0	X	X	3

Sheet D	1	2	3	4	5	6	7	8	9	10	11	Final
Jamie King	0	2	0	1	1	0	2	0	1	0	1	8
Kevin Park	2	0	1	0	0	2	0	1	0	1	0	7

=== Draw 3 ===
Thursday, February 9, 9:00am

Sheet B	1	2	3	4	5	6	7	8	9	10	Final
Jamie King	0	0	1	1	0	0	1	0	1	X	4
Kevin Koe	0	1	0	0	2	1	0	3	0	X	7

Sheet D	1	2	3	4	5	6	7	8	9	10	Final
Kevin Martin	1	0	1	1	1	1	0	3	X	X	8
Brock Virtue	0	0	0	0	0	0	2	0	X	X	2

=== Draw 4 ===
Thursday, February 9, 2:00pm

Sheet A	1	2	3	4	5	6	7	8	9	10	Final
Matthew Blandford	0	0	1	0	1	0	0	X	X	X	2
Kurt Balderston	0	2	0	4	0	1	1	X	X	X	8

Sheet B	1	2	3	4	5	6	7	8	9	10	Final
Lloyd Hill	3	1	0	0	0	1	0	1	1	0	7
Tom Appelman	0	0	1	2	3	0	2	0	0	2	10

Sheet C	1	2	3	4	5	6	7	8	9	10	Final
Kevin Park	0	1	0	1	0	2	1	0	2	0	7
Greg Hill	1	0	1	0	3	0	0	2	0	1	8

Sheet D	1	2	3	4	5	6	7	8	9	10	Final
Dean Ross	0	1	0	0	0	0	1	1	0	X	3
Robert Schlender	0	0	2	2	3	0	0	0	1	X	8

=== Draw 5 ===
Thursday, February 9, 6:30pm

Sheet A	1	2	3	4	5	6	7	8	9	10	11	Final
Robert Schlender	1	0	1	0	2	1	1	0	1	0	1	8
Jamie King	0	2	0	1	0	0	0	2	0	2	0	7

Sheet B	1	2	3	4	5	6	7	8	9	10	Final
Greg Hill	0	1	0	0	0	0	2	0	0	X	3
Brock Virtue	1	0	0	1	1	0	0	2	1	X	6

A Qualifier Match

Sheet C	1	2	3	4	5	6	7	8	9	10	Final
Kevin Martin	0	0	2	0	1	0	0	1	0	1	5
Kevin Koe	1	1	0	1	0	1	0	0	2	0	6

Sheet D	1	2	3	4	5	6	7	8	9	10	Final
Tom Appelman	0	0	0	0	0	3	0	0	1	1	5
Kurt Balderston	0	0	1	0	1	0	0	2	0	0	4

=== Draw 6 ===
Friday, February 10, 9:00am

Sheet A	1	2	3	4	5	6	7	8	9	10	Final
Dean Ross	0	2	0	0	0	0	X	X	X	X	2
Kevin Park	3	0	3	1	0	1	X	X	X	X	8

Sheet C	1	2	3	4	5	6	7	8	9	10	Final
Matthew Blandford	0	2	0	2	0	0	0	0	1	0	5
Greg Hill	2	0	1	0	2	1	1	0	0	0	7

Sheet D	1	2	3	4	5	6	7	8	9	10	Final
Lloyd Hill	0	1	0	1	1	0	0	4	1	X	8
Jamie King	1	0	2	0	0	0	1	0	0	X	4

=== Draw 7 ===
Friday, February 10, 2:00pm

Sheet B	1	2	3	4	5	6	7	8	9	10	Final
Tom Appelman	0	0	0	1	0	1	0	0	X	X	2
Kevin Martin	0	2	2	0	1	0	1	1	X	X	7

Sheet D	1	2	3	4	5	6	7	8	9	10	Final
Robert Schlender	0	0	1	0	2	0	2	0	X	X	5
Brock Virtue	3	1	0	1	0	2	0	5	X	X	12

=== Draw 8 ===
Friday, February 10, 6:30pm

Sheet A	1	2	3	4	5	6	7	8	9	10	Final
Kurt Balderston	1	0	3	0	0	1	0	0	0	0	5
Robert Schlender	0	2	0	1	1	0	0	2	1	2	9

Sheet B	1	2	3	4	5	6	7	8	9	10	Final
Lloyd Hill	1	0	1	0	0	1	1	0	1	0	5
Greg Hill	0	1	0	0	2	0	0	2	0	1	6

B Qualifier Match

Sheet C	1	2	3	4	5	6	7	8	9	10	Final
Brock Virtue	0	0	2	1	1	0	2	0	1	0	7
Kevin Martin	0	1	0	0	0	1	0	2	0	0	4

Sheet D	1	2	3	4	5	6	7	8	9	10	11	Final
Tom Appelman	0	2	0	0	1	0	0	0	0	1	0	4
Kevin Park	1	0	1	0	0	0	0	2	0	0	3	7

=== Draw 9 ===
Saturday, February 11, 1:00pm

C Qualifier Matches

Sheet C	1	2	3	4	5	6	7	8	9	10	Final
Kevin Park	0	0	0	2	0	0	1	0	2	0	5
Robert Schlender	0	3	0	0	2	1	0	1	0	1	8

Sheet D	1	2	3	4	5	6	7	8	9	10	Final
Greg Hill	0	1	0	0	0	1	X	X	X	X	2
Kevin Martin	2	0	1	1	2	0	X	X	X	X	6

== Playoffs ==
Page playoff system
A	Kevin Koe	9
B	Brock Virtue	2
C1	Robert Schlender	4
C2	Kevin Martin	5

Semifinal
B	Brock Virtue	8
C2	Kevin Martin	7

Final
A	Kevin Koe	6
B	Brock Virtue	3

=== A vs. B ===
Saturday, February 11, 6:30pm

Sheet C	1	2	3	4	5	6	7	8	9	10	Final
Kevin Koe	0	4	0	2	0	0	0	3	X	X	9
Brock Virtue	0	0	1	0	1	0	0	0	X	X	2

=== C1 vs. C2 ===
Saturday, February 11, 6:30pm

Sheet A	1	2	3	4	5	6	7	8	9	10	Final
Robert Schlender	0	2	0	0	0	0	1	0	0	1	4
Kevin Martin	2	0	1	0	1	1	0	0	0	0	5

=== Semifinal ===
Sunday, February 12, 9:30am

Sheet B	1	2	3	4	5	6	7	8	9	10	Final
Brock Virtue	2	0	1	2	0	2	0	0	0	1	8
Kevin Martin	0	1	0	0	2	0	2	1	1	0	7

=== Final ===
Sunday, February 12, 3:00pm

Sheet C	1	2	3	4	5	6	7	8	9	10	Final
Kevin Koe	2	1	0	0	0	1	0	2	0	X	6
Brock Virtue	0	0	0	0	1	0	1	0	1	X	3

2012 Boston Pizza Cup

Kevin Koe
Alberta Provincial Championship title
