= 1998 World Curling Tour Championship =

Curling world championship

1998 Apollo World Curling Tour Championship
- Host city: Fort McMurray, Alberta
- Arena: C.A. Knight Recreation Centre
- Dates: March 26–29
- Winner: (Alberta) Team Martin
- Curling club: Ottewell CC, Edmonton
- Skip: Kevin Martin
- Third: Don Walchuk
- Second: Rudy Ramcharan
- Lead: Marcel Rocque
- Finalist: (Manitoba) Vic Peters

The 1998 Apollo World Curling Tour Championship was held March 26–29, 1998 at the C.A. Knight Recreation Centre in Fort McMurray, Alberta. It was the 1998 edition of the Players' Championship, the championship of the men's World Curling Tour (WCT) for the 1997–98 curling season. The total purse for the event was $60,000, with the winning team receiving $12,000.

Edmonton's Kevin Martin rink easily defeated Winnipeg's Vic Peters in the final, 9–3. In the first end of the game, Martin got off to a good start by making a two-and-a-half foot split for two to take the lead, following a heavy draw by Peters. After Peters drew to the button for a single in the second, Martin made a double takeout for three in the third to take a 5–1 lead. In the sixth end, Peters attempted a freeze, but was heavy. This allowed Martin to make a tap back for four, after which Peters conceded. It was the second tour championship for Martin, after having won the 1994 event.

== Round-robin standings ==
The top two teams in each pool advanced to the playoffs.

Final round-robin standings

Key
Teams to Playoffs
Teams to Tiebreakers

Division 1	Locale	W	L
(British Columbia) Bert Gretzinger	Kelowna, British Columbia	4	1
(Manitoba) Vic Peters	Winnipeg, Manitoba	4	1
(Alberta) Mike Sali	Calgary, Alberta	3	2
(Alberta) Brent MacDonald	Edmonton, Alberta	2	3
(Manitoba) Jeff Stoughton	Winnipeg, Manitoba	1	4
(Alberta) Rob Schlender	Edmonton, Alberta	1	4

Division 2	Locale	W	L
(Alberta) Kevin Martin	Edmonton, Alberta	4	1
(Saskatchewan) Randy Woytowich	Regina, Saskatchewan	3	2
(Alberta) Lowell Peterman	Red Deer, Alberta	3	2
(Saskatchewan) Gerald Shymko	Yorkton, Saskatchewan	2	3
(Ontario) Rich Moffatt	Ottawa, Ontario	2	3
(Ontario) Al Hackner	Thunder Bay, Ontario	1	4

Division 3	Locale	W	L
(Alberta) Mickey Pendergast	Calgary, Alberta	4	1
(Ontario) Mike Harris	Toronto, Ontario	3	2
(Saskatchewan) Brad Heidt	Kerrobert, Saskatchewan	2	3
(Saskatchewan) Brian Humble	Swift Current, Saskatchewan	2	3
(Manitoba) Dale Duguid	Winnipeg, Manitoba	2	3
(Sweden) Peja Lindholm	Östersund, Sweden	2	3

Division 4	Locale	W	L
(Alberta) Randy Ferbey	Edmonton, Alberta	5	0
(Quebec) Guy Hemmings	Montreal, Quebec	3	2
(Manitoba) Kerry Burtnyk	Winnipeg, Manitoba	2	3
(Saskatchewan) Doran Johnson	Saskatoon, Saskatchewan	2	3
(Alberta) Doug Walker	Beaumont, Alberta	2	3
(Alberta) Kevin Park	Edmonton, Alberta	1	4

== Scores ==
Scores were as follows:

=== Draw 1 ===
- Woytowich 8, Moffatt 6
- Martin 9, Peterman 6
- Hackner 9, Shymko 6
- Walker 9, Hemmings 1
- Burtnyk 10, Park 7
- Ferbey 8, Johnson 4

=== Draw 2 ===
- Peters 10, Sali 6
- Gretzinger 9, Stoughton 2
- Schlender 8, MacDonald 7
- Pendergast 6, Duguid 5
- Humble 8, Harris 3
- Heidt 8, Lindholm 4

=== Draw 3 ===
- Ferbey 8, Burtnyk 4
- Hemmings 7, Johnson 4
- Woytowich 10, Peterman 8
- Moffatt 10, Hackner 5
- Shymko 7, Martin 5
- Walker 8, Park 4

=== Draw 4 ===
- Heidt 9, Duguid 6
- Humble 8, Pendergast 6
- Gretzinger 7, Sali 6
- Lindholm 8, Harris 6
- Stoughton 9, Schlender 4
- Peters 8, MacDonald 1

=== Draw 5 ===
- Ferbey 8, Walker 3
- Johnson 7, Burtnyk 2
- Martin 8, Hackner 7
- Peterman 10, Moffatt 8,
- Hemmings 8, Park 7
- Woytowich 7, Shymko 6

=== Draw 6 ===
- Harris 6, Hedit 3
- Gretzinger 8, Peters 2
- Sali 7, Schlender 5
- Pendergast 7, Lindholm 6
- MacDonald 7, Stoughton 5
- Duguid 7, Humble 6

=== Draw 7 ===
- Johnson 8, Park 2
- Burtnyk 7, Walker 0
- Peterman 9, Hacker 4
- Martin 8, Woytowich 3
- Ferbey 7, Hemmings 6
- Moffatt 8, Shymko 6

=== Draw 8 ===
- Harris 7, Pendergast 6
- Humble 7, Heidt 2
- Duguid 10, Lindholm 2
- MacDonald 7, Gretzinger 1
- Sali 9, Stoughton 5
- Peters 7, Schlender 2

=== Draw 9 ===
- Peters 6, Stoughton 1
- Pendergast 8, Hedit 2
- Lindholm 6, Humble 4
- Sali 6, MacDonald 4
- Harris 7, Duguid 4
- Gretzinger 6, Schlender 4

=== Draw 10 ===
- Ferbey 6, Park 2
- Walker 6, Johnston 5
- Hemmings 9, Burtnyk 5
- Woytowich 8, Hackner 7
- Peterman 10, Shymko 9
- Martin 7, Moffatt 6

=== Tiebreaker ===
- Woytowich 9, Peterman 8

== Playoffs ==
Quarterfinals
(Alberta) Randy Ferbey	8
(Ontario) Mike Harris	3
(British Columbia) Bert Gretzinger	6
(Manitoba) Vic Peters	8
(Alberta) Mickey Pendergast	4
(Quebec) Guy Hemmings	7
(Alberta) Kevin Martin	9
(Saskatchewan) Randy Woytowich	1

Semifinals
(Alberta) Randy Ferbey	7
(Manitoba) Vic Peters	8
(Quebec) Guy Hemmings	5
(Alberta) Kevin Martin	6

Finals
(Manitoba) Vic Peters	3
(Alberta) Kevin Martin	9

=== Quarterfinals ===
Team	1	2	3	4	5	6	7	8	9	10	Final
(Alberta) Kevin Martin	2	2	0	2	3	X	X	X	X	X	9
(Saskatchewan) Randy Woytowich	0	0	1	0	0	X	X	X	X	X	1

Team	1	2	3	4	5	6	7	8	9	10	Final
(Alberta) Randy Ferbey	0	2	0	2	0	1	0	0	3	X	8
(Ontario) Mike Harris	1	0	1	0	0	0	0	1	0	X	3

Team	1	2	3	4	5	6	7	8	9	10	Final
(British Columbia) Bert Gretzinger	0	1	0	0	2	0	3	0	0	X	6
(Manitoba) Vic Peters	0	0	1	2	0	3	0	1	1	X	8

Team	1	2	3	4	5	6	7	8	9	10	Final
(Quebec) Guy Hemmings	1	0	2	0	0	1	0	1	0	2	7
(Alberta) Mickey Pendergast	0	1	0	0	2	0	1	0	0	0	4

=== Semifinals ===
Team	1	2	3	4	5	6	7	8	9	10	Final
(Alberta) Randy Ferbey	0	0	1	0	3	0	1	0	2	0	7
(Manitoba) Vic Peters	1	1	0	2	0	1	0	2	0	1	8

Team	1	2	3	4	5	6	7	8	9	10	Final
(Alberta) Kevin Martin	1	0	0	0	2	0	2	0	0	1	6
(Quebec) Guy Hemmings	0	0	0	2	0	2	0	0	1	0	5

=== Final ===
Team	1	2	3	4	5	6	7	8	9	10	Final
(Manitoba) Vic Peters	0	1	0	0	2	0	X	X	X	X	3
(Alberta) Kevin Martin	2	0	3	0	0	4	X	X	X	X	9
