= 2011 Canada Cup of Curling =

2011 Capital One Canada Cup of Curling
- Host city: Cranbrook, British Columbia
- Arena: Cranbrook Recreational Complex
- Dates: November 30 – December 4
- Attendance: 21,589
- Men's winner: (Alberta) Kevin Martin
- Curling club: Saville SC, Edmonton
- Skip: Kevin Martin
- Third: John Morris
- Second: Marc Kennedy
- Lead: Ben Hebert
- Finalist: (Ontario) Glenn Howard
- Women's winner: (Manitoba) Jennifer Jones
- Curling club: St. Vital CC, Winnipeg
- Skip: Jennifer Jones
- Third: Kaitlyn Lawes
- Second: Joëlle Sabourin
- Lead: Dawn Askin
- Finalist: (Manitoba) Chelsea Carey

The 2011 Capital One Canada Cup of Curling was held from November 30 to December 4 at the Cranbrook Recreational Complex in Cranbrook, British Columbia. The format for this year's competition was changed from the previous year. Instead of 10 men's and 10 women's teams in two pools of five each, there were seven teams of each gender competing in a round robin. The first place teams advanced to their respective finals, while the second and third place teams met in the semifinals. Capital One became the sponsor of the Canada Cup of Curling after a deal with the Canadian Curling Association to become the sponsor of the Canada Cup and the Pre-Trials Road to the Roar.

In the women's final, Jennifer Jones picked up her second Canada Cup after winning a one-sided affair against fellow Manitoban Chelsea Carey, winning in eight ends with a score of 9–4. In the men's final, Kevin Martin won his record fourth Canada Cup as skip and avenged a loss to Glenn Howard at last year's Cup, winning with a score of 7–4.

The winners, Kevin Martin and Jennifer Jones, became the first teams to qualify for the 2013 Canadian Olympic Curling Trials in Winnipeg, Manitoba, which will determine Canada's representatives for the 2014 Winter Olympic Games in Sochi, Russia. The total prize money was CAD$70,000 each for the men's and women's events, and the winning teams each received CAD$26,000. In addition to berths into the 2013 Trials, the winners also received invitations to the 2012 Canada Cup of Curling in Moose Jaw, Saskatchewan and the 2013 Continental Cup of Curling at Penticton, British Columbia.

== Team entries ==
=== Women ===
- Defending champion: Stefanie Lawton
- 2011 Scotties Tournament of Hearts champion: Amber Holland
- 2010–11 CTRS team: Jennifer Jones
- 2010–11 CTRS team: Shannon Kleibrink
- 2010–11 CTRS team: Heather Nedohin
- 2010–11 CTRS team: Chelsea Carey
- 2010–11 CTRS team: Rachel Homan

=== Men ===
- Defending champion: Glenn Howard
- 2011 Tim Hortons Brier champion: Jeff Stoughton
- 2010–11 CTRS team: Kevin Martin
- 2010–11 CTRS team: Mike McEwen
- 2010–11 CTRS team: Kevin Koe
- 2010–11 CTRS team: Steve Laycock
- 2010–11 CTRS team: Brad Jacobs

== Men ==
=== Teams ===
Skip	Third	Second	Lead	Locale
Glenn Howard	Wayne Middaugh	Brent Laing	Craig Savill	Coldwater, Ontario
Brad Jacobs	E. J. Harnden	Ryan Harnden	Scott Seabrook	Sault Ste. Marie, Ontario
Kevin Koe	Pat Simmons	Carter Rycroft	Nolan Thiessen	Edmonton, Alberta
Steve Laycock	Joel Jordison	Brennen Jones	Dallan Muyres	Regina, Saskatchewan
Kevin Martin	John Morris	Marc Kennedy	Ben Hebert	Edmonton, Alberta
Mike McEwen	B. J. Neufeld	Matt Wozniak	Denni Neufeld	Winnipeg, Manitoba
Jeff Stoughton	Jon Mead	Reid Carruthers	Steve Gould	Winnipeg, Manitoba

=== Round-robin standings ===
Key
Teams to Playoffs

Skip	W	L
(Alberta) Kevin Martin	6	0
(Ontario) Glenn Howard	4	2
(Manitoba) Jeff Stoughton	4	2
(Alberta) Kevin Koe	3	3
(Manitoba) Mike McEwen	2	4
(Saskatchewan) Steve Laycock	1	5
(Ontario) Brad Jacobs	1	5

=== Round-robin results ===
==== Draw 1 ====
Wednesday, November 30, 9:00 am

Sheet B	1	2	3	4	5	6	7	8	9	10	Final
(Ontario) Glenn Howard	0	1	0	2	0	0	0	1	2	X	6
(Ontario) Brad Jacobs 🔨	0	0	2	0	0	1	0	0	0	X	3

Sheet C	1	2	3	4	5	6	7	8	9	10	Final
(Manitoba) Mike McEwen	0	1	0	1	0	1	0	1	0	X	4
(Alberta) Kevin Koe 🔨	0	0	2	0	2	0	2	0	1	X	7

==== Draw 2 ====
Wednesday, November 30, 2:00 pm

Sheet B	1	2	3	4	5	6	7	8	9	10	Final
(Saskatchewan) Steve Laycock	0	1	0	0	2	0	1	0	X	X	4
(Alberta) Kevin Martin 🔨	2	0	0	3	0	1	0	3	X	X	9

Sheet C	1	2	3	4	5	6	7	8	9	10	Final
(Manitoba) Jeff Stoughton	2	1	0	0	0	2	0	0	1	X	7
(Ontario) Brad Jacobs	0	0	3	1	0	0	0	0	0	X	4

==== Draw 3 ====
Wednesday, November 30, 7:00 pm

Sheet B	1	2	3	4	5	6	7	8	9	10	Final
(Manitoba) Mike McEwen	0	0	0	2	0	0	0	X	X	X	2
(Manitoba) Jeff Stoughton 🔨	2	0	1	0	1	1	2	X	X	X	7

Sheet C	1	2	3	4	5	6	7	8	9	10	Final
(Ontario) Glenn Howard	1	0	1	0	0	3	0	0	2	0	7
(Saskatchewan) Steve Laycock 🔨	0	2	0	2	1	0	0	3	0	1	9

Sheet D	1	2	3	4	5	6	7	8	9	10	Final
(Alberta) Kevin Koe	0	2	0	2	0	1	0	0	1	1	7
(Alberta) Kevin Martin 🔨	1	0	2	0	2	0	2	1	0	0	8

==== Draw 4 ====
Thursday, December 1, 9:00 am

Sheet A	1	2	3	4	5	6	7	8	9	10	Final
(Ontario) Brad Jacobs	0	0	0	1	1	0	1	1	0	X	4
(Alberta) Kevin Martin 🔨	1	1	0	0	0	4	0	0	2	X	8

Sheet E	1	2	3	4	5	6	7	8	9	10	Final
(Manitoba) Jeff Stoughton	1	0	4	0	2	0	2	0	0	X	9
(Saskatchewan) Steve Laycock 🔨	0	1	0	1	0	2	0	0	2	X	6

==== Draw 5 ====
Thursday, December 1, 2:00 pm

Sheet D	1	2	3	4	5	6	7	8	9	10	Final
(Manitoba) Mike McEwen	0	1	0	1	0	0	2	0	X	X	4
(Ontario) Glenn Howard 🔨	0	0	2	0	1	2	0	3	X	X	8

Sheet E	1	2	3	4	5	6	7	8	9	10	Final
(Ontario) Brad Jacobs 🔨	0	1	0	0	1	0	2	0	2	0	6
(Alberta) Kevin Koe	1	0	1	1	0	2	0	2	0	2	9

==== Draw 6 ====
Thursday, December 1, 7:00 pm

Sheet A	1	2	3	4	5	6	7	8	9	10	Final
(Saskatchewan) Steve Laycock 🔨	0	0	1	1	0	0	0	X	X	X	2
(Manitoba) Mike McEwen	1	0	0	0	4	1	2	X	X	X	8

Sheet D	1	2	3	4	5	6	7	8	9	10	Final
(Manitoba) Jeff Stoughton	0	4	0	2	0	0	3	0	0	1	10
(Alberta) Kevin Koe 🔨	2	0	2	0	0	1	0	1	2	0	8

Sheet E	1	2	3	4	5	6	7	8	9	10	Final
(Alberta) Kevin Martin 🔨	2	0	1	0	2	1	0	1	0	3	10
(Ontario) Glenn Howard	0	2	0	2	0	0	2	0	2	0	8

==== Draw 7 ====
Friday, December 2, 9:00 am

Sheet B	1	2	3	4	5	6	7	8	9	10	Final
(Ontario) Brad Jacobs 🔨	0	0	1	0	1	0	2	0	0	X	4
(Manitoba) Mike McEwen	0	1	0	1	0	2	0	1	1	X	6

Sheet C	1	2	3	4	5	6	7	8	9	10	Final
(Alberta) Kevin Koe 🔨	0	1	0	0	0	1	0	3	0	0	5
(Ontario) Glenn Howard	0	0	0	0	2	0	3	0	1	1	7

==== Draw 8 ====
Friday, December 2, 2:00 pm

Sheet C	1	2	3	4	5	6	7	8	9	10	11	Final
(Alberta) Kevin Martin 🔨	0	1	0	2	0	0	0	1	0	2	1	7
(Manitoba) Jeff Stoughton	1	0	2	0	0	0	2	0	1	0	0	6

Sheet D	1	2	3	4	5	6	7	8	9	10	Final
(Saskatchewan) Steve Laycock	0	0	1	0	2	0	1	0	X	X	4
(Ontario) Brad Jacobs 🔨	2	3	0	2	0	2	0	2	X	X	11

==== Draw 9 ====
Friday, December 2, 7:00 pm

Sheet A	1	2	3	4	5	6	7	8	9	10	Final
(Ontario) Glenn Howard 🔨	1	0	0	2	0	0	0	1	0	X	4
(Manitoba) Jeff Stoughton	0	0	1	0	1	1	0	0	0	X	3

Sheet B	1	2	3	4	5	6	7	8	9	10	Final
(Alberta) Kevin Koe 🔨	2	0	2	0	0	1	0	2	0	X	7
(Saskatchewan) Steve Laycock	0	1	0	1	0	0	0	0	2	X	4

Sheet D	1	2	3	4	5	6	7	8	9	10	Final
(Alberta) Kevin Martin 🔨	0	2	1	0	2	0	0	1	0	1	7
(Manitoba) Mike McEwen	0	0	0	2	0	1	1	0	1	0	5

=== Playoffs ===
Semifinal			Final
			1	(Alberta) Kevin Martin	7
2	(Ontario) Glenn Howard	9	2	(Ontario) Glenn Howard	4
3	(Manitoba) Jeff Stoughton	5

==== Semifinal ====
Saturday, December 3, 6:00 pm

Team	1	2	3	4	5	6	7	8	9	10	Final
(Ontario) Glenn Howard 🔨	2	0	1	0	1	0	3	0	2	X	9
(Manitoba) Jeff Stoughton	0	1	0	1	0	1	0	2	0	X	5

Player Percentages
(Ontario) Team Howard		(Manitoba) Team Stoughton	
Craig Savill	93%	Steve Gould	94%
Brent Laing	83%	Reid Carruthers	86%
Wayne Middaugh	90%	Jon Mead	92%
Glenn Howard	100%	Jeff Stoughton	87%
Total	92%	Total	90%

==== Final ====
Sunday, December 4, 1:30 pm

Team	1	2	3	4	5	6	7	8	9	10	Final
(Alberta) Kevin Martin 🔨	0	0	2	0	2	0	1	0	1	1	7
(Ontario) Glenn Howard	0	1	0	1	0	1	0	1	0	0	4

Player Percentages
(Alberta) Team Martin		(Ontario) Team Howard	
Ben Hebert	98%	Craig Savill	99%
Marc Kennedy	83%	Brent Laing	96%
John Morris	90%	Wayne Middaugh	89%
Kevin Martin	83%	Glenn Howard	81%
Total	88%	Total	91%

== Women ==
=== Teams ===
Skip	Third	Second	Lead	Locale
Chelsea Carey	Kristy Jenion	Kristen Foster	Lindsay Titheridge	Morden, Manitoba
Amber Holland	Kim Schneider	Tammy Schneider	Heather Kalenchuk	Kronau, Saskatchewan
Rachel Homan	Emma Miskew	Alison Kreviazuk	Lisa Weagle	Ottawa, Ontario
Jennifer Jones	Kaitlyn Lawes	Joëlle Sabourin	Dawn Askin	Winnipeg, Manitoba
Shannon Kleibrink	Amy Nixon	Bronwen Webster	Carolyn Darbyshire (Note: Darbyshire filled in for Chelsey Matson)	Calgary, Alberta
Stefanie Lawton	Sherry Anderson	Sherri Singler	Marliese Kasner	Saskatoon, Saskatchewan
Heather Nedohin	Beth Iskiw	Jessica Mair	Laine Peters	Edmonton, Alberta

=== Round-robin standings ===
Key
Teams to Playoffs

Skip	W	L
(Manitoba) Chelsea Carey	5	1
(Alberta) Shannon Kleibrink	5	1
(Manitoba) Jennifer Jones	3	3
(Ontario) Rachel Homan	2	4
(Saskatchewan) Amber Holland	2	4
(Alberta) Heather Nedohin	2	4
(Saskatchewan) Stefanie Lawton	2	4

=== Round-robin results ===
==== Draw 1 ====
Wednesday, November 30, 9:00 am

Sheet A	1	2	3	4	5	6	7	8	9	10	11	Final
(Saskatchewan) Stefanie Lawton	1	0	1	0	2	0	0	0	2	0	0	6
(Alberta) Heather Nedohin 🔨	0	1	0	1	0	2	0	1	0	1	1	7

Sheet E	1	2	3	4	5	6	7	8	9	10	Final
(Ontario) Rachel Homan	0	0	1	0	1	1	0	X	X	X	3
(Manitoba) Chelsea Carey 🔨	0	2	0	3	0	0	4	X	X	X	9

==== Draw 2 ====
Wednesday, November 30, 2:00 pm

Sheet A	1	2	3	4	5	6	7	8	9	10	11	Final
(Manitoba) Chelsea Carey 🔨	1	0	0	0	2	0	2	0	1	0	1	7
(Alberta) Shannon Kleibrink	0	0	0	1	0	2	0	2	0	1	0	6

Sheet D	1	2	3	4	5	6	7	8	9	10	Final
(Alberta) Heather Nedohin 🔨	0	1	0	0	0	2	0	3	0	X	6
(Manitoba) Jennifer Jones	0	0	2	1	0	0	4	0	2	X	9

Sheet E	1	2	3	4	5	6	7	8	9	10	Final
(Saskatchewan) Stefanie Lawton 🔨	0	2	0	0	2	0	1	0	0	X	5
(Saskatchewan) Amber Holland	1	0	2	0	0	1	0	1	2	X	7

==== Draw 3 ====
Wednesday, November 30, 7:00 pm

Sheet A	1	2	3	4	5	6	7	8	9	10	11	Final
(Saskatchewan) Amber Holland	0	1	0	2	0	1	0	1	0	2	0	7
(Ontario) Rachel Homan 🔨	1	0	1	0	2	0	2	0	1	0	3	10

Sheet E	1	2	3	4	5	6	7	8	9	10	Final
(Manitoba) Jennifer Jones 🔨	0	3	0	0	0	0	2	0	2	0	7
(Alberta) Shannon Kleibrink	1	0	2	1	1	1	0	2	0	1	9

==== Draw 4 ====
Thursday, December 1, 9:00 am

Sheet B	1	2	3	4	5	6	7	8	9	10	11	Final
(Alberta) Shannon Kleibrink 🔨	2	0	0	0	2	0	2	0	2	0	1	9
(Alberta) Heather Nedohin	0	0	3	0	0	3	0	1	0	1	0	8

Sheet C	1	2	3	4	5	6	7	8	9	10	Final
(Manitoba) Jennifer Jones 🔨	1	0	2	0	1	0	1	0	1	0	6
(Saskatchewan) Stefanie Lawton	0	2	0	2	0	1	0	1	0	1	7

Sheet D	1	2	3	4	5	6	7	8	9	10	Final
(Saskatchewan) Amber Holland 🔨	0	2	0	0	1	0	0	X	X	X	3
(Manitoba) Chelsea Carey	3	0	0	3	0	2	1	X	X	X	9

==== Draw 5 ====
Thursday, December 1, 2:00 pm

Sheet B	1	2	3	4	5	6	7	8	9	10	11	Final
(Manitoba) Chelsea Carey 🔨	0	0	0	1	0	1	0	2	0	0	1	5
(Saskatchewan) Stefanie Lawton	0	0	0	0	1	0	2	0	0	1	0	4

Sheet C	1	2	3	4	5	6	7	8	9	10	Final
(Alberta) Heather Nedohin	0	1	0	2	0	0	1	0	2	0	6
(Ontario) Rachel Homan 🔨	2	0	1	0	2	0	0	2	0	2	9

==== Draw 6 ====
Thursday, December 1, 7:00 pm

Sheet B	1	2	3	4	5	6	7	8	9	10	Final
(Ontario) Rachel Homan	1	0	1	0	2	0	1	0	1	X	6
(Manitoba) Jennifer Jones 🔨	0	2	0	4	0	2	0	1	0	X	9

Sheet C	1	2	3	4	5	6	7	8	9	10	Final
(Alberta) Shannon Kleibrink	0	0	3	0	1	0	0	2	0	1	7
(Saskatchewan) Amber Holland 🔨	1	1	0	1	0	1	1	0	1	0	6

==== Draw 7 ====
Friday, December 2, 9:00 am

Sheet D	1	2	3	4	5	6	7	8	9	10	11	Final
(Saskatchewan) Stefanie Lawton 🔨	2	0	2	0	2	0	1	0	1	0	1	9
(Ontario) Rachel Homan	0	2	0	2	0	2	0	1	0	1	0	8

Sheet E	1	2	3	4	5	6	7	8	9	10	11	Final
(Manitoba) Chelsea Carey 🔨	0	2	0	1	1	0	0	1	0	2	0	7
(Alberta) Heather Nedohin	1	0	2	0	0	0	2	0	2	0	1	8

==== Draw 8 ====
Friday, December 2, 2:00 pm

Sheet A	1	2	3	4	5	6	7	8	9	10	Final
(Manitoba) Jennifer Jones 🔨	2	1	0	0	1	1	1	0	1	0	7
(Manitoba) Chelsea Carey	0	0	2	2	0	0	0	2	0	2	8

Sheet B	1	2	3	4	5	6	7	8	9	10	11	Final
(Alberta) Heather Nedohin	0	0	2	0	3	0	1	0	1	0	0	7
(Saskatchewan) Amber Holland 🔨	0	1	0	1	0	2	0	2	0	1	1	8

Sheet E	1	2	3	4	5	6	7	8	9	10	Final
(Alberta) Shannon Kleibrink 🔨	0	1	0	0	3	1	0	0	3	X	8
(Saskatchewan) Stefanie Lawton	1	0	0	1	0	0	1	1	0	X	4

==== Draw 9 ====
Friday, December 2, 7:00 pm

Sheet C	1	2	3	4	5	6	7	8	9	10	Final
(Ontario) Rachel Homan	0	1	0	1	0	2	0	1	0	0	5
(Alberta) Shannon Kleibrink 🔨	2	0	0	0	1	0	0	0	0	3	6

Sheet E	1	2	3	4	5	6	7	8	9	10	Final
(Saskatchewan) Amber Holland	0	2	1	2	0	1	0	1	0	0	7
(Manitoba) Jennifer Jones 🔨	2	0	0	0	2	0	2	0	0	2	8

=== Playoffs ===
Semifinal			Final
			1	(Manitoba) Chelsea Carey	4
2	(Alberta) Shannon Kleibrink	3	3	(Manitoba) Jennifer Jones	9
3	(Manitoba) Jennifer Jones	6

==== Semifinal ====
Saturday, December 3, 1:00 pm

Team	1	2	3	4	5	6	7	8	9	10	Final
(Alberta) Shannon Kleibrink 🔨	0	1	0	0	0	0	1	0	0	1	3
(Manitoba) Jennifer Jones	2	0	0	0	1	1	0	1	1	0	6

Player Percentages
(Alberta) Team Kleibrink		(Manitoba) Team Jones	
Carolyn Darbyshire	78%	Dawn Askin	94%
Bronwen Webster	85%	Joëlle Sabourin	89%
Amy Nixon	96%	Kaitlyn Lawes	74%
Shannon Kleibrink	83%	Jennifer Jones	90%
Total	85%	Total	86%

==== Final ====
Sunday, December 4, 9:00 am

Team	1	2	3	4	5	6	7	8	9	10	Final
(Manitoba) Chelsea Carey 🔨	0	0	1	0	0	1	0	2	X	X	4
(Manitoba) Jennifer Jones	1	1	0	3	1	0	3	0	X	X	9

Player Percentages
(Manitoba) Team Carey		(Manitoba) Team Jones	
Lindsay Titheridge	81%	Dawn Askin	95%
Kristen Foster	66%	Joëlle Sabourin	92%
Kristy Jenion	77%	Kaitlyn Lawes	94%
Chelsea Carey	63%	Jennifer Jones	94%
Total	71%	Total	94%
