= 2011 Boston Pizza Cup =

- Host city: High River, Alberta
- Arena: High River Arena
- Dates: February 9–13
- Winner: Kevin Martin
- Curling club: Saville Sports Centre, Edmonton
- Skip: Kevin Martin
- Third: John Morris
- Second: Marc Kennedy
- Lead: Ben Hebert
- Finalist: Kevin Koe

The 2011 Boston Pizza Cup was held February 9–13 at the High River Arena in High River, Alberta. The winning team of Kevin Martin represented Alberta at the 2011 Tim Hortons Brier in London, Ontario.

== Teams ==
Skip	Third	Second	Lead	Club(s)	Qualification
Tom Appelman	Ted Appelman	Adam Enright	Brandon Klassen	Saville Sports Centre	A Qualifier - Northern Alberta Curling Association
Randy Ferbey	David Nedohin	Blayne Iskiw	David Harper	Saville Sports Centre	B Qualifier - Northern Alberta Curling Association
Glen Kennedy	Dustin Eckstrand	Steven Meadows	Kris Meadows	Saville Sports Centre	C Qualifier - Northern Alberta Curling Association
Kevin Koe	Blake MacDonald	Carter Rycroft	Nolan Thiessen	Saville Sports Centre	Returning champions
Kevin Martin	John Morris	Marc Kennedy	Ben Hebert	Saville Sports Centre	Canadian Team Ranking System points
Terry Meek	Dean Mamer	Greg Northcott	Eugene Doherty	Calgary CC	B Qualifier - Southern Alberta Curling Association
Dan Petryk	Steve Petryk*	Kevin Yablonski	Brad Chyz	Calgary Winter Club	A Qualifier - Southern Alberta Curling Association
Graham Powell	Ken Powell	Todd Maxwell	Darrell Veiner	Sexsmith CC	A Qualifier - Peace Curling Association
Robert Schlender	Chris Lemishka	Jessi Wilkinson	Darcy Hafso	Calmar CC	Alberta Curling Federation Bonspiel points
Brock Virtue	J. D. Lind	Dominic Daemen	Matthew Ng	Calgary CC	C Qualifier - Southern Alberta Curling Association
Don Walchuk	Chris Schille	D.J. Kidby	Don Bartlett	Saville Sports Centre	Alberta Curling Federation Bonspiel points
Geoff Walker	Tom Sallows	Mike Westlund	Adam Lamers	Grande Prairie CC	B Qualifier - Peace Curling Association

(*Skips and throws third stones)

== Draw Brackets ==
=== A Event ===
Round of 16
Terry Meek	8
Brock Virtue	12
Randy Ferbey	6
Graham Powell	8
A3	Tom Appelman	3
A3	Geoff Walker	10
A4	Steve Petryk	4
A4	Glen Kennedy	7

Quarterfinals
A5	Kevin Martin	10
A1	Brock Virtue	7
A6	Robert Schlender	10
A2	Graham Powell	4
A7	Don Walchuk	7
A3	Geoff Walker	5
A8	Kevin Koe	8
A4	Glen Kennedy	7

Semifinals
A5	Kevin Martin	7
A6	Robert Schlender	3
A7	Don Walchuk	5
A8	Kevin Koe	8

A Qualifier
A9	Kevin Martin	7
A10	Kevin Koe	6

=== B Event ===
Round of 16
Terry Meek	6
Graham Powell	2
Geoff Walker	6
Randy Ferbey	4
A3	Tom Appelman	9
A4	Glen Kennedy	1
A4	Steve Petryk	7
A5	Brock Virtue	9

Quarterfinals
B1	Terry Meek	7
A7	Don Walchuk	8
B2	Geoff Walker	7
A6	Robert Schlender	5
B3	Tom Appelman	9
B4	Brock Virtue	4

Semifinals
B5	Don Walchuk	7
B6	Geoff Walker	9
B7	Tom Appelman	2
A11	Kevin Koe	9

B Qualifier
B8	Geoff Walker	7
B9	Kevin Koe	6

=== C Event ===
Quarterfinals			Semifinals			C Qualifier
			B9	Tom Appelman	10
B1	Graham Powell	1	C1	Randy Ferbey	8
B2	Randy Ferbey	10				C4	Tom Appelman	2
						C5	Brock Virtue	8
			B7	Brock Virtue	10
			B8	Don Walchuk	4

Quarterfinals			Semifinals			C Qualifier
B3	Glen Kennedy	7
B5	Terry Meek	1	C2	Glen Kennedy	5
B4	Steve Petryk	8	C3	Steve Petryk	10
B6	Robert Schlender	4				C6	Steve Petryk	5
						B10	Kevin Koe	6

== Results ==
- All times local (Mountain Standard Time)

=== Draw 1 ===
February 9, 9:30am

Sheet A	1	2	3	4	5	6	7	8	9	10	Final
Tom Appelman	0	0	1	0	0	2	0	X	X	X	3
Geoff Walker	2	1	0	2	3	0	2	X	X	X	10

Sheet B	1	2	3	4	5	6	7	8	9	10	Final
Randy Ferbey	3	0	0	0	0	0	1	0	2	0	6
Graham Powell	0	2	0	1	0	3	0	1	0	1	8

Sheet C	1	2	3	4	5	6	7	8	9	10	Final
Terry Meek	0	3	0	0	0	1	3	0	1	X	8
Brock Virtue	2	0	2	2	3	0	0	3	0	X	12

Sheet D	1	2	3	4	5	6	7	8	9	10	Final
Steve Petryk	1	0	1	0	1	0	0	0	1	0	4
Glen Kennedy	0	2	0	3	0	0	0	1	0	1	7

=== Draw 2 ===
February 9, 6:30pm

Sheet A	1	2	3	4	5	6	7	8	9	10	Final
Graham Powell	0	2	1	0	0	1	0	X	X	X	4
Robert Schlender	2	0	0	3	2	0	3	X	X	X	10

Sheet B	1	2	3	4	5	6	7	8	9	10	Final
Kevin Martin	0	2	0	1	0	2	2	0	3	X	10
Brock Virtue	1	0	2	0	2	0	0	2	0	X	7

Sheet C	1	2	3	4	5	6	7	8	9	10	Final
Glen Kennedy	1	0	0	3	0	2	0	1	0	0	7
Kevin Koe	0	0	2	0	3	0	2	0	0	1	8

Sheet D	1	2	3	4	5	6	7	8	9	10	Final
Don Walchuk	0	2	0	1	0	1	0	2	0	1	7
Geoff Walker	0	0	2	0	1	0	1	0	1	0	5

=== Draw 3 ===
February 10, 9:00am

Sheet B	1	2	3	4	5	6	7	8	9	10	Final
Don Walchuk	0	1	1	0	2	0	0	1	0	X	5
Kevin Koe	0	0	0	5	0	1	0	0	2	X	8

Sheet D	1	2	3	4	5	6	7	8	9	10	Final
Kevin Martin	3	0	0	0	0	0	2	0	2	X	7
Robert Schlender	0	1	0	0	1	0	0	1	0	X	3

=== Draw 4 ===
February 10, 2:00pm

Sheet A	1	2	3	4	5	6	7	8	9	10	11	Final
Steve Petryk	0	1	0	1	0	2	0	0	1	2	0	7
Brock Virtue	2	0	1	0	2	0	0	2	0	0	2	9

Sheet B	1	2	3	4	5	6	7	8	9	10	Final
Tom Appelman	1	3	1	2	0	1	1	X	X	X	9
Glen Kennedy	0	0	0	0	1	0	0	X	X	X	1

Sheet C	1	2	3	4	5	6	7	8	9	10	Final
Geoff Walker	1	0	1	0	2	0	0	1	0	1	6
Randy Ferbey	0	0	0	1	0	1	1	0	1	0	4

Sheet D	1	2	3	4	5	6	7	8	9	10	Final
Terry Meek	1	1	0	4	0	X	X	X	X	X	6
Graham Powell	0	0	1	0	1	X	X	X	X	X	2

=== Draw 5 ===
February 10, 6:30pm

Sheet A	1	2	3	4	5	6	7	8	9	10	Final
Terry Meek	1	0	2	1	0	1	1	0	1	0	7
Don Walchuk	0	4	0	0	2	0	0	1	0	1	8

Sheet B	1	2	3	4	5	6	7	8	9	10	Final
Geoff Walker	1	2	1	0	0	1	1	0	1	X	7
Robert Schlender	0	0	0	2	1	0	0	2	0	X	5

Sheet D	1	2	3	4	5	6	7	8	9	10	Final
Tom Appleman	0	1	0	2	2	2	0	2	X	X	9
Brock Virtue	1	0	1	0	0	0	2	0	X	X	4

=== A Final ===
February 10, 6:30pm

Sheet C	1	2	3	4	5	6	7	8	9	10	11	Final
Kevin Martin	0	0	2	0	2	0	2	0	0	0	1	7
Kevin Koe	0	1	0	1	0	3	0	0	0	1	0	6

=== Draw 6 ===
February 11, 9:00am

Sheet A	1	2	3	4	5	6	7	8	9	10	Final
Graham Powell	0	0	0	1	0	0	X	X	X	X	1
Randy Ferbey	0	2	4	0	3	1	X	X	X	X	10

Sheet C	1	2	3	4	5	6	7	8	9	10	Final
Steve Petryk	2	1	0	1	0	0	2	0	2	X	8
Robert Schlender	0	0	1	0	1	0	0	2	0	X	4

Sheet D	1	2	3	4	5	6	7	8	9	10	Final
Glen Kennedy	0	2	1	0	0	1	2	1	X	X	7
Terry Meek	0	0	0	1	0	0	0	0	X	X	1

=== Draw 7 ===
February 11, 2:00pm

Sheet B	1	2	3	4	5	6	7	8	9	10	Final
Tom Appelman	0	0	0	2	0	0	X	X	X	X	2
Kevin Koe	2	2	1	0	2	2	X	X	X	X	9

Sheet D	1	2	3	4	5	6	7	8	9	10	Final
Don Walchuk	0	2	0	0	1	0	2	0	2	0	7
Geoff Walker	2	0	2	2	0	1	0	1	0	1	9

=== Draw 8 ===
February 11, 6:30pm

Sheet A	1	2	3	4	5	6	7	8	9	10	Final
Brock Virtue	0	3	0	4	0	3	X	X	X	X	10
Don Walchuk	2	0	1	0	1	0	X	X	X	X	4

Sheet B	1	2	3	4	5	6	7	8	9	10	Final
Glen Kennedy	0	0	2	0	1	0	2	0	X	X	5
Steve Petryk	0	4	0	1	0	1	0	4	X	X	10

Sheet D	1	2	3	4	5	6	7	8	9	10	11	Final
Tom Appelman	2	0	2	0	0	2	2	0	0	0	2	10
Randy Ferbey	0	2	0	3	2	0	0	0	0	1	0	8

=== B Final ===
February 11, 6:30pm

Sheet C	1	2	3	4	5	6	7	8	9	10	Final
Geoff Walker	3	0	2	1	0	0	1	0	0	X	7
Kevin Koe	0	1	0	0	1	2	0	1	1	X	6

=== C Final 1 ===
February 12, 1:00pm

Team	1	2	3	4	5	6	7	8	9	10	Final
Brock Virtue	0	1	0	3	0	1	1	0	2	x	8
Tom Appelman	0	0	0	0	1	0	0	1	0	x	2

=== C Final 2 ===
February 12, 1:00pm

Team	1	2	3	4	5	6	7	8	9	10	Final
Steve Petryk	0	0	1	0	0	0	2	0	2	0	5
Kevin Koe	2	0	0	1	1	0	0	1	0	1	6

== Playoffs ==
Page playoff system
A	Kevin Martin	10
B	Geoff Walker	5
C1	Brock Virtue	3
C2	Kevin Koe	6

Semifinal
B	Geoff Walker	7
C2	Kevin Koe	8

Final
A	Kevin Martin	6
C2	Kevin Koe	4

=== C1 vs. C2 ===
February 12, 6:30pm

Team	1	2	3	4	5	6	7	8	9	10	Final
Brock Virtue	0	0	0	0	1	0	1	1	0	X	3
Kevin Koe	2	0	0	1	0	2	0	0	1	X	6

=== A vs. B ===
February 12, 6:30pm

Team	1	2	3	4	5	6	7	8	9	10	Final
Kevin Martin	2	0	1	1	0	3	0	3	X	X	10
Geoff Walker	0	1	0	0	2	0	2	0	X	X	5

=== Semi-final ===
February 13, 9:30am

Team	1	2	3	4	5	6	7	8	9	10	Final
Geoff Walker	1	0	1	0	1	0	2	0	2	0	7
Kevin Koe	0	3	0	1	0	1	0	2	0	1	8

=== Final ===
February 13, 2:00pm

Team	1	2	3	4	5	6	7	8	9	10	Final
Kevin Martin	2	0	0	0	2	1	0	0	0	1	6
Kevin Koe	0	2	0	0	0	0	2	0	0	0	4
