= 2012 Canada Cup of Curling =

2012 Capital One Canada Cup of Curling
- Host city: Moose Jaw, Saskatchewan
- Arena: Mosaic Place
- Dates: November 28 – December 2
- Attendance: 33,160
- Men's winner: (Manitoba) Jeff Stoughton
- Curling club: Charleswood CC, Winnipeg
- Skip: Jeff Stoughton
- Third: Jon Mead
- Second: Reid Carruthers
- Lead: Mark Nichols
- Finalist: (Ontario) Glenn Howard
- Women's winner: (Saskatchewan) Stefanie Lawton
- Curling club: Nutana CC, Saskatoon
- Skip: Stefanie Lawton
- Third: Sherry Anderson
- Second: Sherri Singler
- Lead: Marliese Kasner
- Finalist: (Manitoba) Team Jones

The 2012 Capital One Canada Cup of Curling was held from November 28 to December 2 at Mosaic Place in Moose Jaw, Saskatchewan. This was Moose Jaw's first time hosting the Canada Cup, and Saskatchewan's second time hosting the Canada Cup, which was held in Yorkton in 2009. TSN broadcast the tenth edition of the Canada Cup.

In the women's final, Stefanie Lawton won her third Canada Cup title with a win over Jennifer Jones's rink, skipped by Kaitlyn Lawes. Lawton secured the win with a draw to get one point, winning the game with a score of 6–4. In the men's final, Jeff Stoughton won his first Canada Cup title with a win over last year's runner-up Glenn Howard, drawing for one point in the final end to win the game with a score of 4–3.

The winners, Jeff Stoughton and Stefanie Lawton, qualified for the 2013 Canadian Olympic Curling Trials in Winnipeg, Manitoba, which will determine Canada's representatives for the 2014 Winter Olympic Games in Sochi, Russia. The winners will also be selected by the Canadian Curling Association to represent Team North America at the 2014 Continental Cup of Curling in Las Vegas, Nevada.

== Qualification ==
A total of fourteen teams, seven men's and seven women's teams, have qualified for the Canada Cup through various means:

=== Men ===
- Defending champion: Kevin Martin
- 2012 Tim Hortons Brier champion: Glenn Howard
- 2011–12 CTRS team: Mike McEwen
- 2011–12 CTRS team: Kevin Koe
- 2011–12 CTRS team: John Epping
- 2011–12 CTRS team: Jeff Stoughton
- 2011–12 CTRS team: Brad Gushue

=== Women ===
- Defending champion: Jennifer Jones
- 2012 Scotties Tournament of Hearts champion: Heather Nedohin
- 2011–12 CTRS team: Sherry Middaugh
- 2011–12 CTRS team: Cathy Overton-Clapham
- 2011–12 CTRS team: Stefanie Lawton
- 2011–12 CTRS team: Chelsea Carey
- 2011–12 CTRS team: Crystal Webster

== Men ==
=== Teams ===
The teams are listed as follows:

Skip	Third	Second	Lead	Locale
John Epping	Scott Bailey	Scott Howard	David Mathers	Toronto, Ontario
Brad Gushue	Adam Casey	Brett Gallant	Geoff Walker	St. John's, Newfoundland and Labrador
Glenn Howard	Wayne Middaugh	Brent Laing	Craig Savill	Coldwater, Ontario
Kevin Koe	Pat Simmons	Carter Rycroft	Nolan Thiessen	Edmonton, Alberta
Kevin Martin	John Morris	Marc Kennedy	Ben Hebert	Edmonton, Alberta
Mike McEwen	B. J. Neufeld	Matt Wozniak	Denni Neufeld	Winnipeg, Manitoba
Jeff Stoughton	Jon Mead	Reid Carruthers	Mark Nichols	Winnipeg, Manitoba

=== Round-robin standings ===
Final round-robin standings

Key
Teams to Playoffs
Teams to Tiebreaker

Skip	W	L
(Manitoba) Jeff Stoughton	5	1
(Ontario) Glenn Howard	4	2
(Alberta) Kevin Koe	4	2
(Manitoba) Mike McEwen	4	2
(Ontario) John Epping	3	3
(Alberta) Kevin Martin	1	5
(Newfoundland and Labrador) Brad Gushue	0	6

=== Round-robin results ===
All times listed in Central Time Zone (UTC-6).

==== Draw 1 ====
Wednesday, November 28, 9:00 am

Sheet B	1	2	3	4	5	6	7	8	9	10	Final
(Alberta) Kevin Martin 🔨	0	1	0	1	1	0	1	0	2	0	6
(Ontario) John Epping	0	0	4	0	0	1	0	1	0	1	7

Sheet C	1	2	3	4	5	6	7	8	9	10	Final
(Manitoba) Jeff Stoughton 🔨	2	0	1	0	1	0	1	0	2	2	9
(Ontario) Glenn Howard	0	2	0	1	0	1	0	1	0	0	5

==== Draw 2 ====
Wednesday, November 28, 2:00 pm

Sheet B	1	2	3	4	5	6	7	8	9	10	Final
(Newfoundland and Labrador) Brad Gushue	0	1	0	0	1	0	0	0	X	X	2
(Manitoba) Mike McEwen 🔨	1	0	0	1	0	3	2	1	X	X	8

Sheet C	1	2	3	4	5	6	7	8	9	10	Final
(Alberta) Kevin Koe 🔨	1	0	2	0	0	0	2	0	0	X	5
(Ontario) John Epping	0	1	0	0	1	1	0	0	0	X	3

==== Draw 3 ====
Wednesday, November 28, 7:00 pm

Sheet B	1	2	3	4	5	6	7	8	9	10	Final
(Manitoba) Jeff Stoughton	0	1	1	0	0	1	1	0	2	1	7
(Alberta) Kevin Koe 🔨	1	0	0	1	1	0	0	2	0	0	5

Sheet C	1	2	3	4	5	6	7	8	9	10	Final
(Alberta) Kevin Martin 🔨	3	0	0	1	0	2	0	2	0	2	10
(Newfoundland and Labrador) Brad Gushue	0	0	1	0	2	0	2	0	2	0	7

Sheet D	1	2	3	4	5	6	7	8	9	10	Final
(Ontario) Glenn Howard	0	1	0	0	1	0	1	0	2	1	6
(Manitoba) Mike McEwen 🔨	2	0	2	0	0	2	0	1	0	0	7

==== Draw 4 ====
Thursday, November 29, 9:00 am

Sheet A	1	2	3	4	5	6	7	8	9	10	11	Final
(Ontario) John Epping 🔨	2	0	0	2	0	1	0	1	0	2	0	8
(Manitoba) Mike McEwen	0	1	1	0	3	0	1	0	2	0	1	9

Sheet E	1	2	3	4	5	6	7	8	9	10	Final
(Alberta) Kevin Koe 🔨	0	1	0	2	1	0	1	1	2	0	8
(Newfoundland and Labrador) Brad Gushue	3	0	1	0	0	2	0	0	0	1	7

==== Draw 5 ====
Thursday, November 29, 2:00 pm

Sheet D	1	2	3	4	5	6	7	8	9	10	Final
(Manitoba) Jeff Stoughton	0	1	3	1	1	0	0	1	3	X	10
(Alberta) Kevin Martin 🔨	1	0	0	0	0	2	1	0	0	X	4

Sheet E	1	2	3	4	5	6	7	8	9	10	Final
(Ontario) John Epping	0	0	1	0	2	1	0	X	X	X	4
(Ontario) Glenn Howard 🔨	3	2	0	1	0	0	4	X	X	X	10

==== Draw 6 ====
Thursday, November 29, 7:00 pm

Sheet A	1	2	3	4	5	6	7	8	9	10	Final
(Newfoundland and Labrador) Brad Gushue 🔨	0	1	0	0	2	0	2	0	0	X	5
(Manitoba) Jeff Stoughton	0	0	5	1	0	1	0	1	1	X	9

Sheet D	1	2	3	4	5	6	7	8	9	10	Final
(Alberta) Kevin Koe	0	0	2	0	0	1	1	0	0	X	4
(Ontario) Glenn Howard 🔨	0	3	0	2	1	0	0	0	6	X	12

Sheet E	1	2	3	4	5	6	7	8	9	10	Final
(Manitoba) Mike McEwen	0	0	2	2	1	0	2	0	1	0	8
(Alberta) Kevin Martin 🔨	1	1	0	0	0	1	0	2	0	1	6

==== Draw 7 ====
Friday, November 30, 9:00 am

Sheet B	1	2	3	4	5	6	7	8	9	10	Final
(Ontario) John Epping 🔨	1	2	0	0	2	0	0	1	0	2	8
(Manitoba) Jeff Stoughton	0	0	2	1	0	0	2	0	2	0	7

Sheet C	1	2	3	4	5	6	7	8	9	10	11	Final
(Ontario) Glenn Howard 🔨	1	0	1	0	2	0	1	0	1	0	1	7
(Alberta) Kevin Martin	0	1	0	2	0	1	0	1	0	1	0	6

==== Draw 8 ====
Friday, November 30, 2:00 pm

Sheet C	1	2	3	4	5	6	7	8	9	10	Final
(Manitoba) Mike McEwen 🔨	0	0	0	1	0	0	0	3	0	0	4
(Alberta) Kevin Koe	0	1	1	0	1	1	1	0	1	1	7

Sheet D	1	2	3	4	5	6	7	8	9	10	Final
(Newfoundland and Labrador) Brad Gushue 🔨	1	0	0	1	0	1	0	1	0	X	4
(Ontario) John Epping	0	1	0	0	1	0	2	0	2	X	6

==== Draw 9 ====
Friday, November 30, 7:00 pm

Sheet A	1	2	3	4	5	6	7	8	9	10	Final
(Alberta) Kevin Martin	0	0	0	1	0	1	0	1	X	X	3
(Alberta) Kevin Koe 🔨	0	2	1	0	2	0	1	0	X	X	6

Sheet B	1	2	3	4	5	6	7	8	9	10	Final
(Ontario) Glenn Howard	0	1	0	2	0	2	0	2	X	X	7
(Newfoundland and Labrador) Brad Gushue 🔨	0	0	0	0	2	0	1	0	X	X	3

Sheet D	1	2	3	4	5	6	7	8	9	10	Final
(Manitoba) Mike McEwen	0	0	1	0	0	2	0	0	2	0	5
(Manitoba) Jeff Stoughton 🔨	2	0	0	1	2	0	1	0	0	1	7

=== Tiebreaker ===
Saturday, December 1, 8:00 am

Team	1	2	3	4	5	6	7	8	9	10	Final
(Alberta) Kevin Koe 🔨	1	0	1	0	1	0	2	0	2	0	7
(Manitoba) Mike McEwen	0	2	0	1	0	2	0	3	0	1	9

Player percentages
(Alberta) Kevin Koe		(Manitoba) Mike McEwen	
Nolan Thiessen	88%	Denni Neufeld	89%
Carter Rycroft	73%	Matt Wozniak	83%
Pat Simmons	78%	B. J. Neufeld	96%
Kevin Koe	81%	Mike McEwen	85%
Total	80%	Total	88%

=== Playoffs ===
Semifinal			Final
			1	(Manitoba) Jeff Stoughton	4
2	(Ontario) Glenn Howard	9	2	(Ontario) Glenn Howard	3
3	(Manitoba) Mike McEwen	6

==== Semifinal ====
Saturday, December 1, 6:30 pm

Team	1	2	3	4	5	6	7	8	9	10	Final
(Ontario) Glenn Howard 🔨	3	0	0	3	0	1	0	2	0	X	9
(Manitoba) Mike McEwen	0	0	1	0	2	0	2	0	1	X	6

Player percentages
(Ontario) Glenn Howard		(Manitoba) Mike McEwen	
Craig Savill	90%	Denni Neufeld	94%
Brent Laing	94%	Matt Wozniak	92%
Wayne Middaugh	93%	B. J. Neufeld	67%
Glenn Howard	92%	Mike McEwen	82%
Total	92%	Total	84%

==== Final ====
Sunday, December 2, 2:30 pm

Team	1	2	3	4	5	6	7	8	9	10	Final
(Manitoba) Jeff Stoughton 🔨	1	1	0	0	0	1	0	0	0	1	4
(Ontario) Glenn Howard	0	0	1	0	0	0	2	0	0	0	3

Player percentages
(Manitoba) Jeff Stoughton		(Ontario) Glenn Howard	
Mark Nichols	88%	Craig Savill	91%
Reid Carruthers	80%	Brent Laing	85%
Jon Mead	91%	Wayne Middaugh	81%
Jeff Stoughton	89%	Glenn Howard	93%
Total	87%	Total	88%

== Women ==
=== Teams ===
The teams are listed as follows:

Skip	Third	Second	Lead	Locale
Chelsea Carey	Kristy Jenion	Kristen Foster	Lindsay Titheridge	Morden, Manitoba
Kaitlyn Lawes	Kirsten Wall (Note: Kirsten Wall replaced Jennifer Jones, who was recovering from knee surgery and had recently given birth. The team competed as "Team Jones".)	Jill Officer	Dawn Askin	Winnipeg, Manitoba
Stefanie Lawton	Sherry Anderson	Sherri Singler	Marliese Kasner	Saskatoon, Saskatchewan
Sherry Middaugh	Jo-Ann Rizzo	Lee Merklinger	Leigh Armstrong	Coldwater, Ontario
Heather Nedohin	Beth Iskiw	Jessica Mair	Laine Peters	Edmonton, Alberta
Cathy Overton-Clapham	Jenna Loder	Ashley Howard	Breanne Meakin	Winnipeg, Manitoba
Crystal Webster	Erin Carmody	Geri-Lynn Ramsay	Samantha Preston	Calgary, Alberta

=== Round-robin standings ===
Final round-robin standings

Key
Teams to Playoffs

Skip	W	L
(Saskatchewan) Stefanie Lawton	5	1
(Manitoba) Team Jones	4	2
(Alberta) Heather Nedohin	4	2
(Alberta) Crystal Webster	3	3
(Manitoba) Chelsea Carey	2	4
(Ontario) Sherry Middaugh	2	4
(Manitoba) Cathy Overton-Clapham	1	5

=== Round-robin results ===
All times listed in Central Time Zone (UTC-6).

==== Draw 1 ====
Wednesday, November 28, 9:00 am

Sheet A	1	2	3	4	5	6	7	8	9	10	Final
(Ontario) Sherry Middaugh 🔨	1	0	0	0	2	0	1	0	X	X	4
(Saskatchewan) Stefanie Lawton	0	2	2	3	0	1	0	2	X	X	10

Sheet E	1	2	3	4	5	6	7	8	9	10	Final
(Manitoba) Team Jones 🔨	1	2	0	4	0	0	0	1	0	1	9
(Alberta) Crystal Webster	0	0	2	0	2	0	1	0	2	0	7

==== Draw 2 ====
Wednesday, November 28, 2:00 pm

Sheet A	1	2	3	4	5	6	7	8	9	10	Final
(Alberta) Crystal Webster 🔨	2	1	1	0	0	1	1	1	0	X	7
(Manitoba) Chelsea Carey	0	0	0	0	2	0	0	0	2	X	4

Sheet D	1	2	3	4	5	6	7	8	9	10	Final
(Saskatchewan) Stefanie Lawton 🔨	1	0	0	0	4	0	1	1	0	1	8
(Alberta) Heather Nedohin	0	0	0	1	0	2	0	0	2	0	5

Sheet E	1	2	3	4	5	6	7	8	9	10	Final
(Ontario) Sherry Middaugh 🔨	3	2	0	1	0	0	0	2	0	X	8
(Manitoba) Cathy Overton-Clapham	0	0	1	0	1	1	1	0	1	X	5

==== Draw 3 ====
Wednesday, November 28, 7:00 pm

Sheet A	1	2	3	4	5	6	7	8	9	10	Final
(Manitoba) Cathy Overton-Clapham 🔨	0	1	0	2	0	1	1	0	1	0	6
(Manitoba) Team Jones	1	0	2	0	4	0	0	1	0	1	9

Sheet E	1	2	3	4	5	6	7	8	9	10	Final
(Alberta) Heather Nedohin 🔨	2	1	0	3	1	0	1	0	0	1	9
(Manitoba) Chelsea Carey	0	0	1	0	0	2	0	2	2	0	7

==== Draw 4 ====
Thursday, November 29, 9:00 am

Sheet B	1	2	3	4	5	6	7	8	9	10	11	Final
(Manitoba) Chelsea Carey	0	1	0	1	0	2	0	0	0	1	0	5
(Saskatchewan) Stefanie Lawton 🔨	1	0	1	0	1	0	2	0	0	0	1	6

Sheet C	1	2	3	4	5	6	7	8	9	10	Final
(Alberta) Heather Nedohin	0	0	1	3	1	0	1	1	0	1	8
(Ontario) Sherry Middaugh 🔨	0	3	0	0	0	1	0	0	2	0	6

Sheet D	1	2	3	4	5	6	7	8	9	10	Final
(Manitoba) Cathy Overton-Clapham 🔨	0	0	2	0	0	2	0	0	0	0	4
(Alberta) Crystal Webster	0	1	0	1	1	0	0	2	1	2	8

==== Draw 5 ====
Thursday, November 29, 2:00 pm

Sheet B	1	2	3	4	5	6	7	8	9	10	Final
(Alberta) Crystal Webster	0	2	0	0	1	0	2	0	2	0	7
(Ontario) Sherry Middaugh 🔨	1	0	0	1	0	2	0	2	0	2	8

Sheet C	1	2	3	4	5	6	7	8	9	10	Final
(Saskatchewan) Stefanie Lawton	0	2	0	0	0	2	0	2	0	1	7
(Manitoba) Team Jones 🔨	1	0	0	2	0	0	1	0	1	0	5

==== Draw 6 ====
Thursday, November 29, 7:00 pm

Sheet B	1	2	3	4	5	6	7	8	9	10	Final
(Manitoba) Team Jones	0	1	0	0	1	0	0	1	0	X	3
(Alberta) Heather Nedohin 🔨	2	0	1	2	0	1	1	0	1	X	8

Sheet C	1	2	3	4	5	6	7	8	9	10	Final
(Manitoba) Chelsea Carey 🔨	1	0	1	0	2	0	0	2	0	1	7
(Manitoba) Cathy Overton-Clapham	0	1	0	2	0	0	1	0	0	0	4

==== Draw 7 ====
Friday, November 30, 9:00 am

Sheet D	1	2	3	4	5	6	7	8	9	10	Final
(Ontario) Sherry Middaugh	0	0	4	0	1	0	2	0	1	0	8
(Manitoba) Team Jones 🔨	2	1	0	1	0	2	0	1	0	2	9

Sheet E	1	2	3	4	5	6	7	8	9	10	Final
(Alberta) Crystal Webster	0	1	0	1	0	0	0	2	0	X	4
(Saskatchewan) Stefanie Lawton 🔨	2	0	1	0	0	2	2	0	1	X	8

==== Draw 8 ====
Friday, November 30, 2:00 pm

Sheet A	1	2	3	4	5	6	7	8	9	10	11	Final
(Alberta) Heather Nedohin 🔨	0	1	0	0	0	1	1	0	0	3	0	6
(Alberta) Crystal Webster	1	0	1	1	0	0	0	2	1	0	3	9

Sheet B	1	2	3	4	5	6	7	8	9	10	Final
(Saskatchewan) Stefanie Lawton	0	0	1	0	0	0	0	2	0	0	3
(Manitoba) Cathy Overton-Clapham 🔨	1	0	0	1	0	0	0	0	0	2	4

Sheet E	1	2	3	4	5	6	7	8	9	10	Final
(Manitoba) Chelsea Carey	0	1	0	2	0	2	0	3	0	1	9
(Ontario) Sherry Middaugh 🔨	2	0	1	0	1	0	1	0	2	0	7

==== Draw 9 ====
Friday, November 30, 7:00 pm

Sheet C	1	2	3	4	5	6	7	8	9	10	Final
(Manitoba) Team Jones	0	2	0	1	1	0	1	0	1	1	7
(Manitoba) Chelsea Carey 🔨	1	0	1	0	0	1	0	2	0	0	5

Sheet E	1	2	3	4	5	6	7	8	9	10	11	Final
(Manitoba) Cathy Overton-Clapham	0	1	0	3	0	0	1	0	3	0	0	8
(Alberta) Heather Nedohin 🔨	1	0	0	0	2	1	0	2	0	2	2	10

=== Playoffs ===
Semifinal			Final
			1	(Saskatchewan) Stefanie Lawton	6
2	(Alberta) Heather Nedohin	5	3	(Manitoba) Team Jones	4
3	(Manitoba) Team Jones	9

==== Semifinal ====
Saturday, December 1, 12:30 pm

Team	1	2	3	4	5	6	7	8	9	10	Final
(Alberta) Heather Nedohin 🔨	0	2	0	1	0	1	0	1	0	0	5
(Manitoba) Team Jones	0	0	1	0	3	0	2	0	1	2	9

Player percentages
(Alberta) Heather Nedohin		(Manitoba) Team Jones	
Laine Peters	86%	Dawn Askin	85%
Jessica Mair	90%	Jill Officer	78%
Beth Iskiw	73%	Kirsten Wall	69%
Heather Nedohin	83%	Kaitlyn Lawes	94%
Total	80%	Total	81%

==== Final ====
Sunday, December 2, 9:30 am

Team	1	2	3	4	5	6	7	8	9	10	Final
(Saskatchewan) Stefanie Lawton 🔨	1	0	2	0	1	0	1	0	0	1	6
(Manitoba) Team Jones	0	1	0	1	0	1	0	1	0	0	4

Player percentages
(Saskatchewan) Stefanie Lawton		(Manitoba) Team Jones	
Marliese Kasner	83%	Dawn Askin	85%
Sherri Singler	81%	Jill Officer	76%
Sherry Anderson	76%	Kirsten Wall	78%
Stefanie Lawton	74%	Kaitlyn Lawes	80%
Total	78%	Total	80%
