= 2011 Point Optical Curling Classic =

- Host city: Saskatoon, Saskatchewan
- Arena: Nutana Curling Club
- Dates: September 23–26
- Winner: (Manitoba) Mike McEwen
- Curling club: Assiniboine Memorial CC; Winnipeg, Manitoba
- Skip: Mike McEwen
- Third: B.J. Neufeld
- Second: Matt Wozniak
- Lead: Denni Neufeld
- Finalist: (Alberta) Kevin Martin

The 2011 Point Optical Curling Classic was held from September 23 to 26 at the Nutana Curling Club in Saskatoon, Saskatchewan as part of the 2011–12 World Curling Tour. The purse for the event was CAD$60,000, and the winner, Mike McEwen, received CAD$15,000. McEwen defeated Alberta's Kevin Martin in a tight final, winning 6–5 in the extra end.

== Teams ==
Skip	Third	Second	Lead	Locale
Gerry Adam	Warren Jackson	Dustin Kalthoff	Lyndon Holm	Yorkton, Saskatchewan
Brent Bawel	Mike Jantzen	Sean O'Connor	Hardi Sulimma	Calgary, Alberta
Randy Bryden	Troy Robinson	Trent Knapp	Kelly Knapp	Regina, Saskatchewan
Dale Craig	Jeremy Chevrier	Cory Fleming	Chad Petracek	Saskatoon, Saskatchewan
Carl deConinck Smith	Jeff Sharp	Chris Haichert	Jesse St. John	Rosetown, Saskatchewan
David Nedohin (fourth)	Randy Ferbey (skip)	Ted Appelman	Brendan Melnyk	Edmonton, Alberta
Rob Fowler	Allan Lyburn	Richard Daneault	Derek Samagalski	Brandon, Manitoba
Chris Galbraith	Travis Bale	Bryan Galbraith	Rodney Legault	Winnipeg, Manitoba
James Gordon	Geoff McBain	Adam Knutson	Cliff Walker	Saskatoon, Saskatchewan
Jason Gunnlaugson	Justin Richter	Jason Ackerman	David Kraichy	Beausejour, Manitoba
Jeff Hartung	Kody Hartung	Craig Kaeding	Shayne Hannon	Langenburg, Saskatchewan
Shawn Joyce	Gary Scheirich	Dustin Phillips	Jeremy Tipper	Saskatoon, Saskatchewan
Warren Hassall (fourth)	Jamie King (skip)	Todd Brick	Sean Morris	Edmonton/Calgary, Alberta
Kevin Koe	Pat Simmons	Carter Rycroft	Nolan Thiessen	Edmonton, Alberta
Bruce Korte	Dean Kleiter	Roger Korte	Rob Markowsky	Saskatoon, Saskatchewan
Matt Lang	Colton Flasch	Tyler Hartung	Jayden Shwaga	Saskatoon, Saskatchewan
Steve Laycock	Joel Jordison	Brennen Jones	Dallan Muyres	Saskatoon, Saskatchewan
Kevin Marsh	Matt Ryback	Daniel Marsh	Aaron Shutra	Saskatoon, Saskatchewan
Kevin Martin	John Morris	Marc Kennedy	Ben Hebert	Edmonton, Alberta
Mike McEwen	B. J. Neufeld	Matt Wozniak	Denni Neufeld	Winnipeg, Manitoba
Darrell McKee	Clint Dieno	Jason Jacobson	Brock Montgomery	Saskatoon, Saskatchewan
Sven Michel	Claudio Pätz	Sandro Trolliet	Simon Gempeler	Adelboden, Switzerland
Braeden Moskowy	Kirk Muyres	D.J. Kidby	Dustin Kidby	Regina, Saskatchewan
David Murdoch	Glen Muirhead	Ross Paterson	Richard Woods	Lockerbie, Scotland
Dan Petryk (fourth)	Steve Petryk (skip)	Colin Hodgson	Brad Chyz	Calgary, Alberta
Brady Scharback	Quinn Hersikorn	Jake Hersikorn	Brady Kendel	Saskatoon, Saskatchewan
Robert Schlender	Chris Lemishka	Darcy Hafso	Don Bartlett	Edmonton, Alberta
Daniel Selke	Mat Ring	Spencer Rowe	Brandon Leippi	Regina, Saskatchewan
Jeff Stoughton	Jon Mead	Reid Carruthers	Steve Gould	Winnipeg, Manitoba
Alexey Tselousov	Andrey Drozdov	Alexey Stukalsky	Aleksey Kamnev	Moscow, Russia
Wayne Tuck, Jr.	Craig Kochan	Scott McDonald	Paul Moffatt	Toronto, Ontario
Brock Virtue	J. D. Lind	Dominic Daemen	Matthew Ng	Calgary, Alberta

== Knockout results ==
=== A event ===
First Knockout
(Alberta) Kevin Martin	6
(Saskatchewan) Matt Lang	2
(Scotland) David Murdoch	5
(Russia) Alexey Tselousov	6
(Alberta) Randy Ferbey	7
(Saskatchewan) Gerry Adam	4
(Alberta) Brock Virtue	7
(Saskatchewan) Daniel Selke	3
(Manitoba) Rob Fowler	6
(Saskatchewan) James Gordon	4
(Saskatchewan) Randy Bryden	6
(Saskatchewan) Bruce Korte	5
(Alberta) Steve Petryk	5
(Saskatchewan) Darrell McKee	3
(Saskatchewan) Brady Scharback	3
(Alberta) Kevin Koe	4

Quarterfinals
(Alberta) Kevin Martin	5
(Russia) Alexey Tselousov	1
(Alberta) Randy Ferbey	1
(Alberta) Brock Virtue	5
(Manitoba) Rob Fowler	7
(Saskatchewan) Randy Bryden	2
(Alberta) Steve Petryk	2
(Alberta) Kevin Koe	4

Semifinals
(Alberta) Kevin Martin	5
(Alberta) Brock Virtue	4
(Manitoba) Rob Fowler	3
(Alberta) Kevin Koe	2

Qualifier 1
(Alberta) Kevin Martin	3
(Manitoba) Rob Fowler	4

First Knockout
(Manitoba) Jeff Stoughton	9
(Saskatchewan) Dale Craig	6
(Saskatchewan) Braeden Moskowy	8
(Alberta) Jamie King	0
(Manitoba) Chris Galbraith	8
(Ontario) Wayne Tuck, Jr.	1
(Saskatchewan) Kevin Marsh	0
(Saskatchewan) Steve Laycock	7
(Alberta) Robert Schlender	6
(Saskatchewan) Jeff Hartung	0
(Manitoba) Jason Gunnlaugson	3
(Alberta) Brent Bawel	5
(Switzerland) Sven Michel	8
(Saskatchewan) Carl deConinck Smith	4
(Saskatchewan) Shawn Joyce	4
(Manitoba) Mike McEwen	8

Quarterfinals
(Manitoba) Jeff Stoughton	5
(Saskatchewan) Braeden Moskowy	4
(Manitoba) Chris Galbraith	6
(Saskatchewan) Steve Laycock	3
(Alberta) Robert Schlender	8
(Alberta) Brent Bawel	4
(Switzerland) Sven Michel	4
(Manitoba) Mike McEwen	6

Semifinals
(Manitoba) Jeff Stoughton	4
(Manitoba) Chris Galbraith	2
(Alberta) Robert Schlender	2
(Manitoba) Mike McEwen	5

Qualifier 2
(Manitoba) Jeff Stoughton	3
(Manitoba) Mike McEwen	7

=== B event ===
Round of 16
(Saskatchewan) Matt Lang	4
(Scotland) David Murdoch	6
(Saskatchewan) Daniel Selke	2
(Saskatchewan) Gerry Adam	7

Quarterfinals
(Saskatchewan) Randy Bryden	3
(Scotland) David Murdoch	4
(Alberta) Steve Petryk	6
(Saskatchewan) Gerry Adam	4

Semifinals
(Scotland) David Murdoch	6
(Manitoba) Chris Galbraith	9
(Alberta) Steve Petryk	5
(Alberta) Robert Schlender	1

To Qualifier 3
(Manitoba) Chris Galbraith	3
(Alberta) Steve Petryk	6

Round of 16
(Saskatchewan) James Gordon	4
(Saskatchewan) Bruce Korte	7
(Saskatchewan) Darrell McKee	5
(Saskatchewan) Brady Scharback	4

Quarterfinals
(Russia) Alexey Tselousov	5
(Saskatchewan) Bruce Korte	7
(Alberta) Randy Ferbey	7
(Saskatchewan) Darrell McKee	1

Semifinals
(Saskatchewan) Bruce Korte	5
(Alberta) Randy Ferbey	6

To Qualifier 3
(Alberta) Randy Ferbey	7
(Manitoba) Jeff Stoughton	1
Qualifier 3
(Alberta) Steve Petryk	6
(Alberta) Randy Ferbey	8

Round of 16
(Saskatchewan) Dale Craig	7
(Alberta) Jamie King	4
(Ontario) Wayne Tuck, Jr.	6
(Saskatchewan) Kevin Marsh	5

Quarterfinals
(Alberta) Brent Bawel	5
(Saskatchewan) Dale Craig	4
(Switzerland) Sven Michel	2
(Ontario) Wayne Tuck, Jr.	9

Semifinals
(Alberta) Brent Bawel	5
(Alberta) Brock Virtue	2
(Ontario) Wayne Tuck, Jr.	0
(Alberta) Kevin Koe	8

To Qualifier 4
(Alberta) Brent Bawel	7
(Alberta) Kevin Koe	5

Round of 16
(Saskatchewan) Jeff Hartung	4
(Manitoba) Jason Gunnlaugson	6
(Saskatchewan) Carl deConinck Smith	4
(Saskatchewan) Shawn Joyce	5

Quarterfinals
(Saskatchewan) Braeden Moskowy	7
(Manitoba) Jason Gunnlaugson	3
(Saskatchewan) Steve Laycock	6
(Saskatchewan) Shawn Joyce	5

Semifinals
(Saskatchewan) Braeden Moskowy	6
(Saskatchewan) Steve Laycock	7

To Qualifier 4
(Saskatchewan) Steve Laycock	6
(Alberta) Kevin Martin	7
Qualifier 4
(Alberta) Brent Bawel	1
(Alberta) Kevin Martin	6

=== C event ===
Round of 16
(Saskatchewan) Matt Lang	9
(Saskatchewan) Daniel Selke	1
(Saskatchewan) Dale Craig	3
(Switzerland) Sven Michel	5

Quarterfinals
(Alberta) Brock Virtue	8
(Saskatchewan) Matt Lang	5
(Saskatchewan) Braeden Moskowy	7
(Switzerland) Sven Michel	2

Semifinals
(Alberta) Brock Virtue	5
(Saskatchewan) Braeden Moskowy	6

Qualifier 5
(Saskatchewan) Braeden Moskowy	5
(Alberta) Steve Petryk	6

Round of 16
(Saskatchewan) James Gordon	3
(Saskatchewan) Brady Scharback	8

Quarterfinals
(Manitoba) Jason Gunnlaugson	7
(Saskatchewan) Shawn Joyce	8
(Ontario) Wayne Tuck, Jr.	4
(Saskatchewan) Brady Scharback	8

Semifinals
(Saskatchewan) Shawn Joyce	1
(Manitoba) Jeff Stoughton	6
(Saskatchewan) Brady Scharback	4
(Manitoba) Chris Galbraith	2

Qualifier 6
(Manitoba) Jeff Stoughton	8
(Saskatchewan) Brady Scharback	1

Round of 16
(Alberta) Jamie King	4
(Saskatchewan) Kevin Marsh	5

Quarterfinals
(Alberta) Robert Schlender	4
(Saskatchewan) Kevin Marsh	6
(Russia) Alexey Tselousov	5
(Saskatchewan) Darrell McKee	3

Semifinals
(Saskatchewan) Kevin Marsh	7
(Saskatchewan) Steve Laycock	8
(Russia) Alexey Tselousov	4
(Alberta) Kevin Koe	5

Qualifier 7
(Saskatchewan) Steve Laycock	7
(Alberta) Kevin Koe	2

Round of 16
(Saskatchewan) Randy Bryden	7
(Saskatchewan) Gerry Adam	2
(Saskatchewan) Jeff Hartung	3
(Saskatchewan) Carl deConinck Smith	5

Quarterfinals
(Saskatchewan) Bruce Korte	5
(Saskatchewan) Randy Bryden	7
(Scotland) David Murdoch	9
(Saskatchewan) Carl deConinck Smith	4

Semifinals
(Saskatchewan) Randy Bryden	3
(Scotland) David Murdoch	9

Qualifier 8
(Scotland) David Murdoch	6
(Alberta) Brent Bawel	5

== Playoffs ==
Quarterfinals
(Manitoba) Rob Fowler	7
(Alberta) Steve Petryk	8
(Alberta) Kevin Martin	4
(Manitoba) Jeff Stoughton	3
(Manitoba) Mike McEwen	5
(Saskatchewan) Steve Laycock	4
(Alberta) Randy Ferbey	7
(Scotland) David Murdoch	6

Semifinals
(Alberta) Steve Petryk	4
(Alberta) Kevin Martin	7
(Manitoba) Mike McEwen	9
(Alberta) Randy Ferbey	8

Final
(Alberta) Kevin Martin	5
(Manitoba) Mike McEwen	6
