= Adam Enright =

Canadian curler (born 1983)

- Curler
- Born: November 16, 1983 (age 42); Rosalind, Alberta

Team
- Curling club: Avonair CC, Edmonton, AB
- Skip: Ted Appelman
- Third: Nathan Connolly
- Second: Shawn Donnelly
- Lead: Adam Enright

Curling career
- Brier: 1 (2008)
- Top CTRS ranking: 11th (2006-07)
Medal record
Curling
Representing Canada
Olympic Games
| Gold medal – first place | 2010 Vancouver | Men's |
World Curling Championships
| Gold medal – first place | 2008 Grand Forks | Men's |
Tim Hortons Brier
| Gold medal – first place | 2008 Winnipeg | Men's |
Canadian Olympic Curling Trials
| Gold medal – first place | 2009 Edmonton | Men's |

Adam Enright (born November 16, 1983, in Rosalind, Alberta) is a Canadian curler from Edmonton, Alberta. He is a former alternate for Kevin Martin's rink with whom he won a gold medal at the 2010 Winter Olympics as well as wins at the 2008 Tim Hortons Brier and the 2008 World Men's Curling Championship. Currently, Enright plays third for Kurt Balderston's rink.

== Career ==
In 2002, Enright won the Alberta Junior Championship as the third for Justin Jacobsen. The team finished with a 6–6 record at the 2002 Canadian Junior Curling Championships. Since juniors, Enright has played for such skips as Chris Schille, Charley Thomas and Mark Johnson. In 2006, he played at the Players' Championships as the lead for the Kevin Martin team. They brought him back in 2008 to be their alternate for the Brier and World Championships. They brought him back once again for the 2009 Canadian Olympic Curling Trials. The Martin team won that, giving them (and Enright) the opportunity to play at the 2010 Winter Olympics, where they won the gold medal after defeating Norway in the final. Enright played third for Tom Appelman before playing for Balderston, with whom he qualified for the Alberta provincials.

== Personal life ==
Enright is married to fellow curler Stephanie Enright.
