= Kevin Martin (curler) =

Canadian curler and Olympic champion (born 1966)

Kevin Martin CM
- Curler
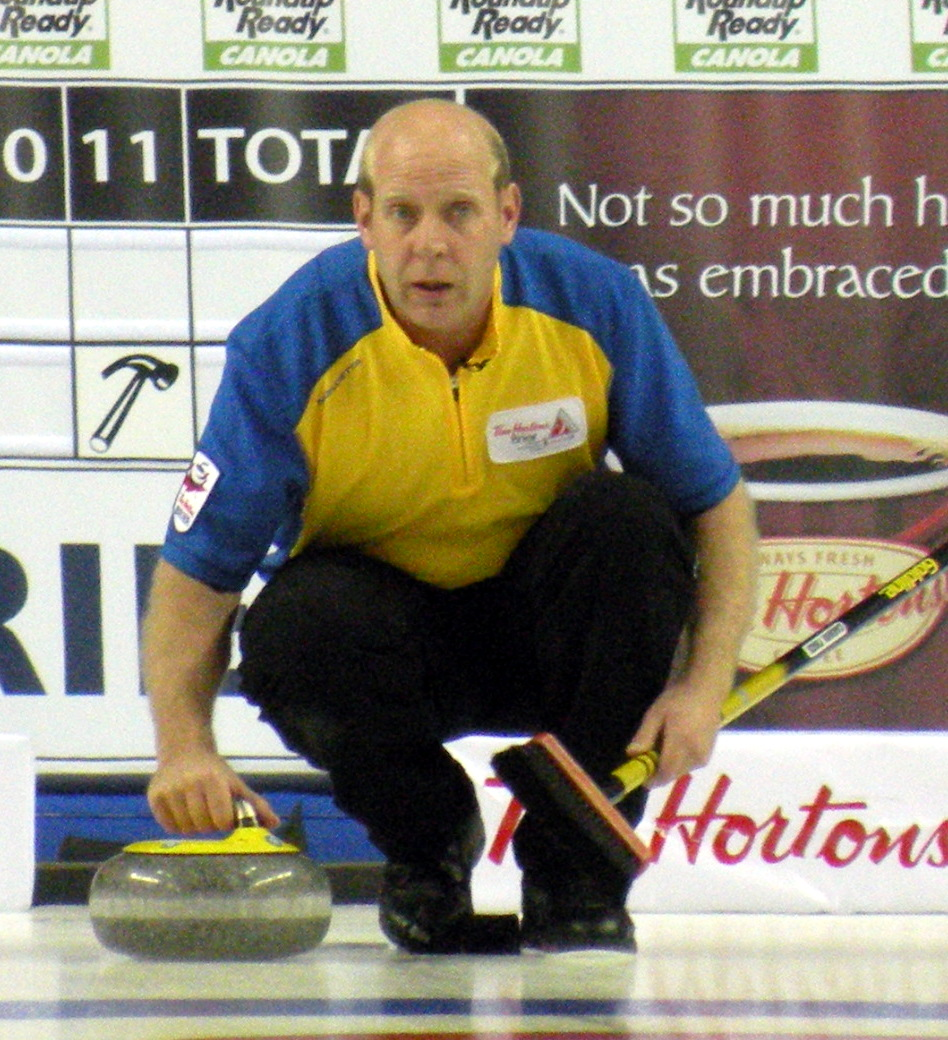
- Martin at the 2009 Tim Hortons Brier
- Born: July 31, 1966 (age 60); Killam, Alberta, Canada

Curling career
- Brier: 12 (1991, 1992, 1995, 1996, 1997, 2000, 2006, 2007, 2008, 2009, 2011, 2013)
- World Championship: 4 (1991, 1997, 2008, 2009)
- Olympic: 3 (1992 (demonstration), 2002, 2010)
- Top CTRS ranking: 1st (2004–05, 2005–06, 2006–07, 2007–08, 2009–10, 2010–11)
- Grand Slam victories: 15; World Cup: 1 (Jan 2003); The National: 4 (Nov. 2004, Mar 2007, Dec 2007, Dec 2010); Canadian Open: 5 (2002, 2005, Jan 2007, Dec 2007, 2010); Players' Championships: 5 (2005, 2007, 2010, 2011, 2014)
Medal record
Men's curling
Representing Canada
Olympic Games
Gold medal – first place	2010 Vancouver	Men's
Silver medal – second place	2002 Salt Lake City	Men's
World Championships
Gold medal – first place	2008 Grand Forks	Men's
Silver medal – second place	1991 Winnipeg	Men's
Silver medal – second place	2009 Moncton	Men's
World Junior Championships
Silver medal – second place	1986 Dartmouth	Men's
Representing Alberta
Tim Hortons Brier
Gold medal – first place	1991 Hamilton	Men's
Gold medal – first place	1997 Calgary	Men's
Gold medal – first place	2008 Winnipeg	Men's
Gold medal – first place	2009 Calgary	Men's
Silver medal – second place	1996 Kamloops	Men's
Bronze medal – third place	1992 Regina	Men's
Bronze medal – third place	1995 Halifax	Men's
Canadian Olympic Trials
Gold medal – first place	2001 Regina	Men's
Gold medal – first place	2009 Edmonton	Men's
Silver medal – second place	1997 Brandon	Men's
Bronze medal – third place	2013 Winnipeg	Men's

Kevin Ray Martin (born July 31, 1966), nicknamed "the Old Bear" and "K-Mart", is a Canadian retired curler originally from Lougheed, Alberta and residing in Edmonton. He is an Olympic, World and four-time Canadian champion and a member of the World Curling Hall of Fame. He is considered by many commentators and former and current curlers to be the greatest curler of all time. He is also known for his rivalries with Randy Ferbey/David Nedohin, the best Alberta provincial rivalry ever as the two teams were generally regarded the best in the world from 2002 to 2006; his rivalry with Jeff Stoughton, perhaps the most famous all prairies rivalry ever which spanned over 2 decades from 1991 to 2014; with Glenn Howard from 2007 to 2014, perhaps the best two team rivalry in Canadian curling history, and his rivalry with Sweden's Peja Lindholm from 1997 to 2006, perhaps the best ever men's Canada-Europe rivalry.

Over his 30-year curling career, he won four Briers, a gold medal at the 2010 Winter Olympics, and one world championship. He went to a total of three Winter Olympics and four World Championships, and won a total of two Olympic medals and three World Championship medals. He won 15 Grand Slam titles on the World Curling Tour (the media count 18, including three Players' Championships won prior to its inclusion as a Grand Slam event), which includes a record eight Players' Championship titles. Over the course of his career, his teams won around $2 million. He was the first skip to win a "career Grand Slam," winning a title in each Grand Slam event, after he won the Players' Championship Grand Slam event in April 2005. Martin also holds the record for the most Olympic victories, with 20 total wins at the Olympics.

During his career, Martin also served as a major influence in the development of the sport of curling, establishing the competitive tier in the sport and setting the groundwork for the management of curling teams and the creation of high-level competitive curling events. He is also known for contributing to the growth of curling, long known as a recreational and participant-based sport, as a spectator sport. Martin retired from competitive curling in 2014. In 2019, Martin was named the greatest Canadian male skip in history in a TSN poll of broadcasters, reporters and top curlers.

In 2024, he was named as a member of the Order of Canada.

== Career ==
=== Junior career ===
Martin began curling when he was six years old. He took up the sport because his father was the vice president of his local curling club. Martin first came on the curling scene in 1985 when his Alberta team of Richard Feeney, Dan Petryk and Michael Berger won the 1985 Canadian Junior Championship in their first year together as a team. The rink (a group of players) finished the round robin in second place, with a win–loss record of 7–4, behind Prince Edward Island's Kent Scales. This forced them into a semifinal against the third place Quebec rink, skipped by Steve Gagnon. They beat Quebec 5–4, earning a spot in the final against Prince Edward Island which they won with a score of 6–3. After winning the championship, he accompanied the Canadian team as an alternate at the 1985 World Junior Curling Championships.

By winning the 1985 Canadian junior championship, the team qualified for the following season's (1986) World Juniors. The team went undefeated through the round robin and won their semifinal match against Sweden. However, in the final, they came up short, losing 7–6 to the Scottish team skipped by David Aitken.

=== Early career ===
Five years out of the World Junior Championships, Martin had formed a new team and won his first provincial championship. This qualified him and his team of Kevin Park, Dan Petryk and Don Bartlett for the 1991 Labatt Brier. At the 1991 Brier, Martin finished the round robin with an 8–3 win–loss record, tying Saskatchewan for first place. Martin knocked off British Columbia in the semifinal, and then beat Saskatchewan (skipped by Randy Woytowich) with a score of 8–4 in the final. The rink was then off to the 1991 Canada Safeway World Curling Championships in Winnipeg. Martin turned the tables, going undefeated through the round robin. After beating Norway's Eigil Ramsfjell in the semifinal, Martin's team lost in the final, losing to Scotland's David Smith with a score of 2–7.

His 1991 Brier victory also earned him a spot at the 1992 Winter Olympics, where curling was just a demonstration sport at the time. Martin won all three of his round robin games before losing the semifinal to Switzerland with a score of 4–8 and losing to the United States with a score of 2–9 in the bronze medal match.

In 1992, Martin won his second provincial championship. His team went 8–3 once again at the 1992 Labatt Brier, tying them in second place with Ontario. However, in the semifinal, the Ontario rink, skipped by Russ Howard, defeated Martin's team by 7–4.

Martin's first World Curling Tour event was the 1993 Players' Championship, then known as the "Seagrams VO Cup". His first WCT event win came the following season at the 1993 Kelowna Cashspiel. Later that season he won the 1994 Players' Championship, which has been retroactively considered his first Slam win, even through the event occurred long before the Grand Slam series began.

=== 1995–1999 ===
After his two Brier seasons, Martin did not win the provincial title again until 1995. In the meantime, he had made some line-up changes in his team, and by the 1995 Labatt Brier, he had settled on James Pahl as his second, retaining Park and Bartlett as his third and lead, respectively. At the 1995 Brier, he placed in third after the round robin with a 7–4 win–loss record, tied with Ontario and Prince Edward Island. Martin knocked off Ontario's Ed Werenich in the page playoffs 3 vs. 4 match, but lost to Kerry Burtnyk's Manitoba rink in the semifinal with a score of 9–3.

In 1995, Martin replaced Park and Pahl with Don Walchuk and Shawn Broda, respectively. Martin won his fourth provincial title, sending him to the 1996 Labatt Brier. The team placed first after the round robin, finishing with a 10–1 win–loss record. However, in the page playoff 1 vs. 2 game, he lost to Manitoba's Jeff Stoughton. In the semifinal, Martin rebounded with a win over Quebec, but the rematch against Stoughton in the final resulted in a loss in an extra end, which Stoughton stole after a light draw by Martin to win the game 8–7.

In 1996, Broda was replaced by Rudy Ramcharan on the team. With his new team, Martin won another provincial title, and at the 1997 Labatt Brier, he once again finished the round robin with a 10–1 win–loss record. His only loss came to the undefeated Vic Peters rink of Manitoba. However, Martin met and defeated Peters twice in the playoffs, including winning the final with a score of 10–8. With this win, Martin won his second Brier and the right to go to the 1997 Ford World Men's Curling Championship. Martin topped the round robin at the Worlds, with a 7–2 win–loss record, but lost to Sweden in the semifinal with a score of 6–4 and then to Scotland in the bronze medal match with a score of 8–4.

In 1997, Martin looked to represent Canada at the Olympics once again. The 1998 Winter Olympics would mark the first time curling would be an official medal sport at the games. At the 1997 Canadian Olympic Curling Trials, Martin's rink finished with a 6–3 win–loss record, tied in second place with Ed Werenich. Martin knocked off Werenich in the semifinal but lost to the then little known Mike Harris in the final with a score of 6–5. For the next few years, Martin would fail to make it back to the Brier. In 1998, Martin won his second Players' Championship of his career, then known as the "Apollo World Curling Tour Championship".

=== 1999–2006 ===
In 1999, Martin dropped Ramcharan, who was embroiled by a scandal where he botched organizing a bonspiel, and replaced him with Carter Rycroft, an upstart junior curler. In 2000, Martin won his sixth provincial title, defeating Frank Morissette 4–2 in the final. However, the 2000 Labatt Brier would be a flop for the team, which finished with a 6–5 win–loss record out of the playoffs. A week later, Martin capped the season off by winning his third Players' Championship.

Following a failed bid to win the 2001 Alberta championship, the team then boycotted the Brier, as prominent curling teams of the day wanted to focus more on the World Curling Tour, while the Canadian Curling Association scheduled events conflicting with major WCT events. In the meantime, however, Martin still had his sights set on an Olympic championship. The team went to the 2001 Canadian Olympic Curling Trials and finished first after the round robin with a 7–2 win–loss record. That gave the team a bye to the finals, which Martin won by defeating Kerry Burtnyk with a score of 8–7.

At the 2002 Winter Olympics, Martin lost just one round robin matchup and qualified for the playoffs. In the semifinal, Martin knocked off Sweden's Peja Lindholm by a score of 6–4, breaking a long losing streak to his main nemesis. In the final, Martin faced Norway, skipped by Pål Trulsen. Early on Martin fell behind 3–0 with Trulsen's team taking steals of 1 and 2, forcing Kevin into extremely difficult final shots due to their dominant and aggressive front end play. Team Martin steadied themselves and climbed to 5–5 with hammer going into the final end however. In the final end, Martin had a simple draw against one Norway rock to win, identical to his successful draw in the Olympic Trials final vs Kerry Burtnyk, which he missed, giving Trulsen the win with a score of 6–5. As a result, Norway clinched the gold medal, and Martin, representing Canada, won his third international silver.

Due to the boycott, Martin's rink would not win another provincial title until 2006. In the meantime, the team had amassed five Grand Slam titles and won the 2005 Canada Cup of Curling.

Martin played in his third Canadian Olympic Trials in 2005. The event was a disappointment for the team, which finished with a 4–5 record. However, later in the season, the team won the 2006 Alberta provincials, defeating Mark Johnson in the final. This put the team in to the 2006 Tim Hortons Brier, Martin's first Brier appearance in six years. The team finished the round robin tied in second place with an 8–3 record. However, in the page playoff 3 vs. 4 game, Martin's rink was edged by Nova Scotia's Mark Dacey 8–7. The team would later win the 2006 Canada Cup of Curling.

=== 2006–2013 ===
On April 26, 2006 Martin announced the breakup of his long-time, Olympic silver medallist team of lead Don Bartlett, second Carter Rycroft and third Don Walchuk. The team had disappointed at the 2005 Trials, had not won a single Grand Slam title in the 2005–06 season, and topped it off by finishing fourth at the Brier. Martin replaced Walchuk, Rycroft and Bartlett with World Junior Champion skip John Morris at third, Marc Kennedy at second and Ben Hebert at lead. His new team won the 2007 Alberta provincials, defeating Team Kevin Koe in the final, 9–7 after Team Koe fourth Blake MacDonald missed two draws to win. This sent the team to their first Brier, where they finished the round robin with an 8–3 win–loss record in second place, tied with Manitoba and Newfoundland and Labrador. The new team struggled at the 2007 Brier in Hamilton, and lost in the 3 vs. 4 game to Jeff Stoughton, 6–3. Despite their Brier failure, however, the season was a success on the World Curling Tour, where they won three of the four Grand Slams. During the 2006–07 and 2007–08 curling seasons, Martin and his team won an unprecedented five consecutive Grand Slams, three in the 2006–07 season and two in the 2007–08 season.

The team won their second straight provincials in 2008, sending them to the 2008 Tim Hortons Brier. On March 13, 2008, Martin's team from Alberta became the first team since 2003 to go through the round robin at the Tim Hortons Brier undefeated. They finished the round robin with a perfect 11–0 win–loss record. They knocked off Saskatchewan 8–7 in the 1 vs. 2 game, and then beat rival and defending champion Glenn Howard of Ontario 5–4 in the final. With that perfect finish, Martin won his third Brier title. Martin finally won his first World Championship at the 2008 World Men's Curling Championship in Grand Forks, North Dakota. After finishing the round robin with a 10–1 win–loss record, he lost to Scotland, skipped by David Murdoch, in the 1 vs. 2 game, only to beat them in a rematch in the final 6–3. This was the first time Kevin Martin won a gold medal at an international curling event. The Martin rink finished the 2007–08 season with two more Grand Slam titles. Due to his Brier and World Championship successes in 2008, the Canadian Curling Association selected Kevin Martin's team (along with Jennifer Jones, Kevin Koe and Stefanie Lawton) to be Canada's representatives on "Team North America" at the 2008 Continental Cup of Curling.

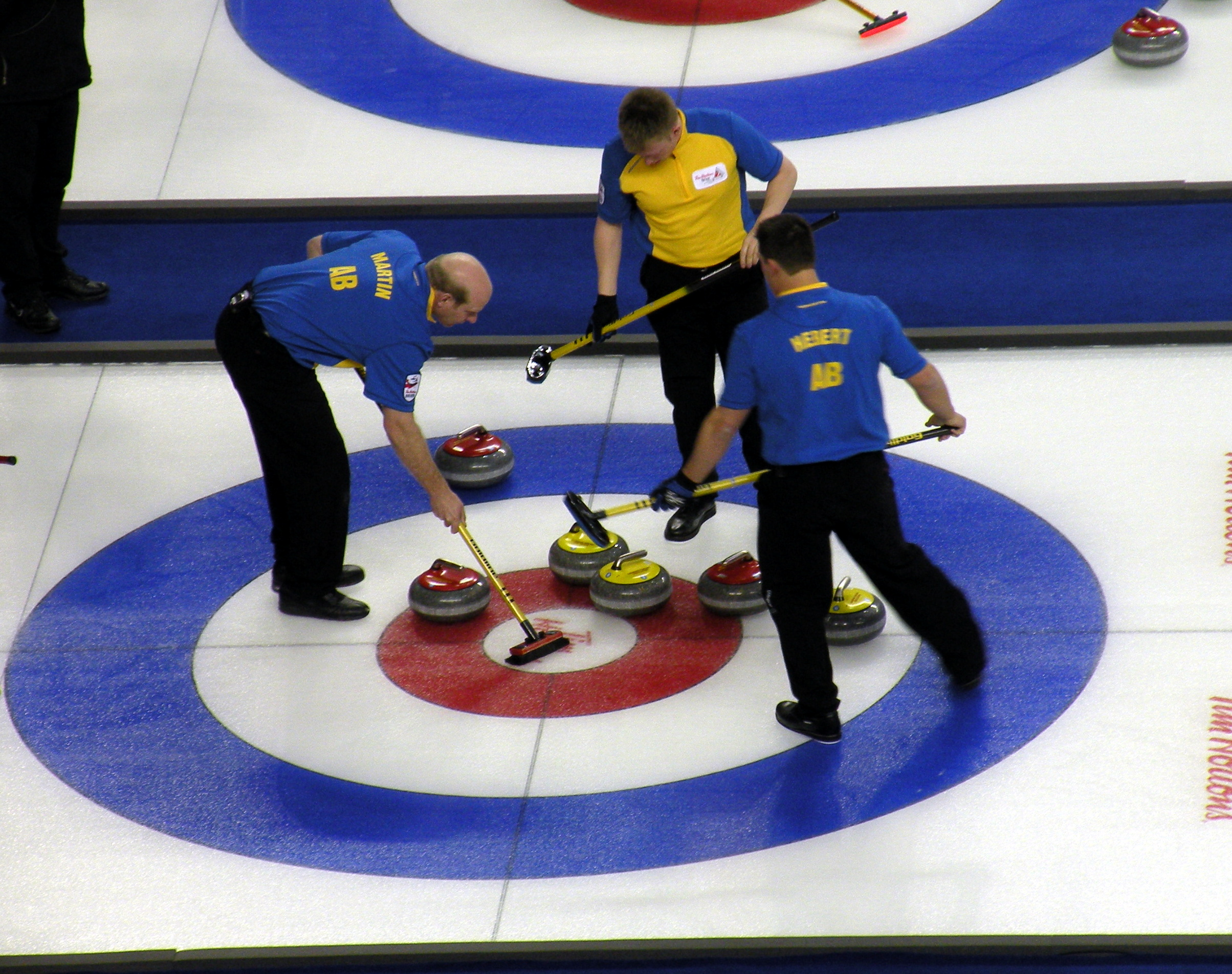
Martin sweeps a stone in the house at the 2009 Tim Hortons Brier

The 2008–09 season would be almost as successful for Martin. He once again qualified for the Brier, winning the Alberta provincial championship, and then once again went 13–0 in the 2009 Tim Hortons Brier. He knocked off Glenn Howard 7–6 followed by Jeff Stoughton in the final by a 7–4 result. A week later, at the 2009 Canada Cup of Curling, Martin won his third title, defeating fellow Edmonton rink Randy Ferbey in the final. At the 2009 Ford World Men's Curling Championship, Martin won 10 straight games until he met Scotland in the final round robin game. Martin lost to Scotland and then lost to them again in the 1–2 page playoff game. Martin rebounded with a tight semifinal victory over Switzerland, but had to face Scotland in a third matchup in the final. The game was tied going into the last end with Martin having the last rock advantage. Before his first rock, Martin was lying one in a complicated setup. After spending about six minutes trying to decide which shot to try, he went against the wishes of his teammates and threw away his shot, forcing Scotland's David Murdoch to make a double-tap to sit shot. Murdoch made his shot, leaving Martin with a short-raise double, which he missed, losing the championship to Scotland, 7–6.

Martin's team directly qualified for the 2009 Canadian Olympic Curling Trials in his hometown of Edmonton. In his fourth Trials, Martin lost just one round robin game. After defeating the previously undefeated Glenn Howard rink in his final round robin game, Martin got a bye to the final, which was against Howard, whom he defeated 7–3. With the win, Martin earned the right to represent Canada for the second time at the Olympics. After the Olympic Trials, Martin's rink failed to qualify for the playoffs at the 2010 Swiss Chalet National. This would mark the first time Martin failed to make the playoffs at a Grand Slam since 2003. However, they proved they were worthy to represent Canada at the Olympics by winning the 2010 BDO Classic Canadian Open two weeks later.

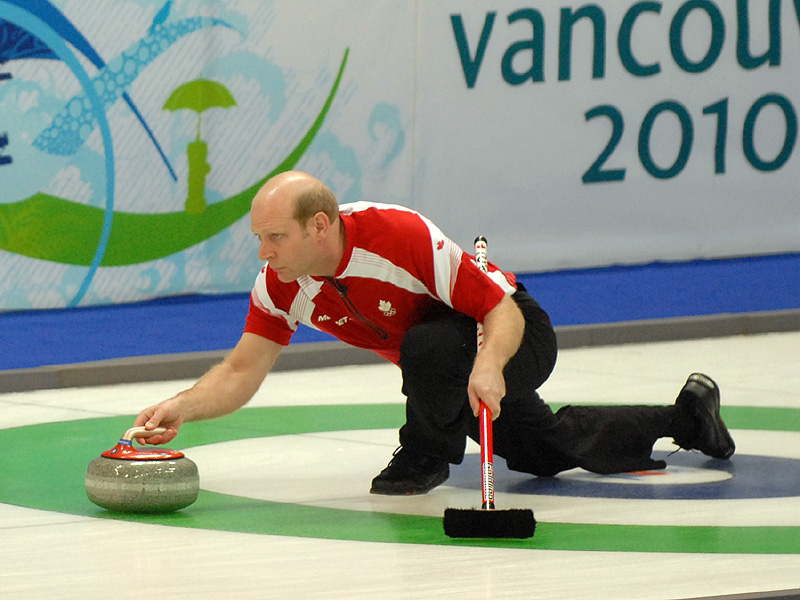
Martin throws a stone during round robin play at the 2010 Winter Olympics.

At the 2010 Winter Olympics, Martin's team went undefeated (9–0) during the round-robin phase, becoming the first team to achieve this feat since the British curling team at the 1924 Chamonix Olympics. After winning the semifinal against Sweden's Niklas Edin, Martin went on to win the gold medal, defeating Norway's Thomas Ulsrud 6–3, in a rematch of Martin's only previous Olympic final. Martin wrapped up his Olympic season by winning the 2010 Players' Championships, his second Grand Slam win of the year. He beat Brad Gushue in the final in an extra end.

It took the Martin rink until December 2010 to win another major bonspiel. Martin claimed another Slam by winning the National again over Jeff Stoughton. However, he was defeated by Stoughton in the quarterfinal of the Canadian Open.

Martin made his eleventh appearance at the Brier playing for Alberta, after defeating Kevin Koe in the final of the provincials. He went through the round robin with a 9–2 win–loss record, and had some trouble during the round robin after losing crucial games to Manitoba and Newfoundland/Labrador in less than 10 ends. After a close win over Glenn Howard in the round robin, Martin dropped a 4–5 decision to Howard after he missed a crucial shot in the 3 vs. 4 game of the playoffs, and he lost the bronze medal game to Brad Gushue 10–5, playing without second Marc Kennedy, because Kennedy and his wife were expecting a child. Martin finished the 2010–11 season by winning his record 7th Players' Championship.

Martin's first event of the 2011–12 World Curling Tour was the Point Optical Curling Classic, where he finished as a runner-up to Mike McEwen. He then won his first event of the season, the Westcoast Curling Classic, against McEwen. He next participated in the Cactus Pheasant Classic as the defending champion, but lost to Randy Ferbey in the semifinals. At the World Cup of Curling, Martin finished the round robin with a 4–1 win–loss record, but missed a chance to win another Grand Slam title after he was edged past by John Epping, 3–4. He failed to make it into the playoffs at his next event, the Sun Life Classic. He and his team then competed in the Canada Cup of Curling, securing close wins over Glenn Howard and Jeff Stoughton in the round robin and finishing the round robin undefeated. He then played Howard in the final, and managed to defeat him with a score of 7–4, winning his record 4th Canada Cup title as skip. He and his team also earned berths into the 2012 Canada Cup, Continental Cup, and, most importantly, the 2013 Olympic Trials.

Martin then went to Dawson Creek, British Columbia for a shot at an eighteenth Grand Slam title at the National. He went undefeated through the round robin and made it to the final, where he lost a close game 6–5 to Glenn Howard. In February, Martin and team went to Camrose, Alberta for the 2012 Boston Pizza Cup to play for a chance to represent Alberta at the 2012 Brier. They barely qualified for the playoffs after Martin broke his 22-game win streak at the provincials in losing their first qualifier game to Kevin Koe and then lost another qualifier game to Brock Virtue. They then defeated Robert Schlender in the bottom page playoff game and advanced to the semifinal against Virtue, where they lost a tight game in the tenth end. Martin's loss meant that he will not be able to represent Alberta at the Brier for the first time since 2010. It also marked the first time since 2005 that he has not won a provincial championship in which he participated. Martin then won the 2012 Pomeroy Inn & Suites Prairie Showdown final against Liu Rui, and then won the 2012 Victoria Curling Classic Invitational final against Mike McEwen. Martin wrapped up the season by participating in the 2012 Players' Championship, finishing the round robin with a 5–2 win–loss record. However, he was upset in the semifinals by John Epping, who went on to win the title.

Martin began his 2012–13 season with the Point Optical Curling Classic, where he was the runner-up the previous year. He lost a close match in the semifinals to provincial rival Kevin Koe. He next played at the Westcoast Curling Classic, and won his third straight title and his seventh title overall with a win in the final over Andrew Bilesky. Martin participated at the Whites Drug Store Classic, but lost to Randy Bryden in the quarterfinals in an extra end. Martin then competed in the Masters Grand Slam of Curling, where he lost in the semifinals after a close loss to Koe in an extra end. Martin then participated in the Canada Cup of Curling, but was unable to match strong play from his opponents, and finished the event with a 1–5 win–loss record, out of the playoffs. Martin was scheduled to play at the Canadian Open of Curling, but had to withdraw due to a hernia. He was replaced by Joe Frans, and the team finished outside of the playoffs. After recovering, Martin participated in the Continental Cup, where he assisted in leading Team North America to a fifth win over Team World. Martin also participated in the All-Star Curling Skins Game, where his all-star team lost in the semifinal against Glenn Howard's all-star team. Martin then competed in the Alberta provincials, where he clinched the first seed in the playoffs after edging provincial rival Kevin Koe. He defeated Aaron Sluchinski in the page playoff, and edged Koe in an extra end in the final to claim his twelfth provincial title.

At the 2013 Brier, Martin and team began the round-robin with one win and four losses, including losses to Jeff Stoughton, Jean-Michel Ménard, and eventual champion Brad Jacobs, before winning their final six matches. Despite a 7–4 win–loss record, they did not qualify for the playoffs, placing fifth and becoming the first Alberta team since Martin's squad in 2000 to miss the playoffs. At the Players' Championship, Martin and team finished with a 2–2 win–loss record, and they advanced to a tiebreaker, where they lost to John Epping. A few days after the conclusion of the Players' Championship, Martin's longtime third, John Morris, announced that he and Martin were parting ways.

=== 2013–2014 ===
A few weeks after Morris announced his departure from the team, Martin announced that David Nedohin, the fourth player on his former provincial rival Randy Ferbey's team, would join Martin's team. Martin and team won their first event of the season at the Shoot-Out. They made the semifinals in their next event at the Point Optical Curling Classic, but Martin injured his back during the semifinal game. Jeff Sharp subbed in at lead, and Martin's team finished the event as runners-up to Jeff Stoughton. After winning the final of the Direct Horizontal Drilling Fall Classic over Brock Virtue and posting a semifinals finish at the Cactus Pheasant Classic, Martin played in the Masters Grand Slam, finishing the round robin with a 3–1 win–loss record. He proceeded to win his games over Kevin Koe and Liu Rui before reaching the final, where he played a close game with Glenn Howard until Howard pulled away with the win.

Martin attempted to qualify for his fourth Olympics appearance through the 2013 Canadian Olympic Curling Trials. In the round robin, he and his team played consistently and posted a 6–1 win–loss record, with their only loss coming to eventual champion Brad Jacobs. Their record qualified for the semifinal, where they lost a close game to John Morris's team. Martin was hired by NBC Sports to work as a curling analyst during the 2014 Winter Olympics, a role that he would fill again at the 2018 Winter Olympics.

After starting off the Canadian Open of Curling with a 4–1 win–loss record, Martin dropped his quarterfinals game against Brad Gushue in the final end of the game. Martin also posted a strong start at the next Grand Slam, The National, but lost to Glenn Howard in the quarterfinals. On April 18, 2014, amidst rumours of his front end, Marc Kennedy and Ben Hebert, joining provincial rival Kevin Koe in the next season, Martin announced his retirement from curling following the conclusion of the 2014 Players' Championship. At the last tournament of his career, Martin posted a 3–2 win–loss record in the round robin, and advanced to the playoffs. He edged John Epping and Mike McEwen en route to the final, where he recorded a 4–3 win over Brad Jacobs while curling at 98%. He capped his career with an eighteenth Grand Slam title, his eighth at the Players' Championship.

=== Post retirement ===
Following his retirement, Martin became a curling analyst for Sportsnet. Following the end of the season, it was announced that Martin had been inducted into the Canadian Curling Hall of Fame. He was inducted into the World Curling Hall of Fame at the 2018 World Men's Curling Championship.

Martin announced his departure from being part of the Grand Slam broadcast team in 2026.

=== Legacy ===
During his playing career, Martin greatly influenced the evolution of the sport of curling into a competitive sport. He was an instrumental part of the group that brought about the Grand Slam of Curling. In the early 2000s, he became the spokesperson for the promotion of the financial growth of curling, represented largely by the World Curling Tour, which was growing in popularity due to the benefits afforded by corporate sponsorship opportunities and cash prizes at tournaments. The Martin-led boycott of the Canadian Curling Association for its refusal to allow the developments in the World Curling Tour to be mirrored in the Brier catalyzed not only the transformation of the Brier, but also the growth of the Grand Slam, and in doing so, ultimately allowed the sport of curling to become a legitimate spectator sport. The development of the competitive tier of the sport also marked a change in both the players of the sport and the sport itself, as evidenced by improvements in the development and training of curlers as athletes and improvements in the quality of curling games due to better ice conditions and precision-based gameplay.

== Career statistics ==
=== Grand Slam record ===
Key
C	Champion
F	Lost in Final
SF	Lost in Semifinal
QF	Lost in Quarterfinals
R16	Lost in the round of 16
Q	Did not advance to playoffs
T2	Played in Tier 2 event
DNP	Did not participate in event
N/A	Not a Grand Slam event that season

Event	2001–02	2002–03	2003–04	2004–05	2005–06	2006–07	2007–08	2008–09	2009–10	2010–11	2011–12	2012–13	2013–14
Masters	QF	C	SF	QF	F	SF	QF	QF	QF	QF	SF	SF	F
Canadian Open	SF	C	SF	C	SF	C	C	F	C	QF	QF	DNP	QF
The National	DNP	SF	DNP	C	QF	C	C	SF	Q	C	F	SF	QF
Players'	SF	Q	F	C	F	C	F	SF	C	C	SF	Q	C

=== Teams ===
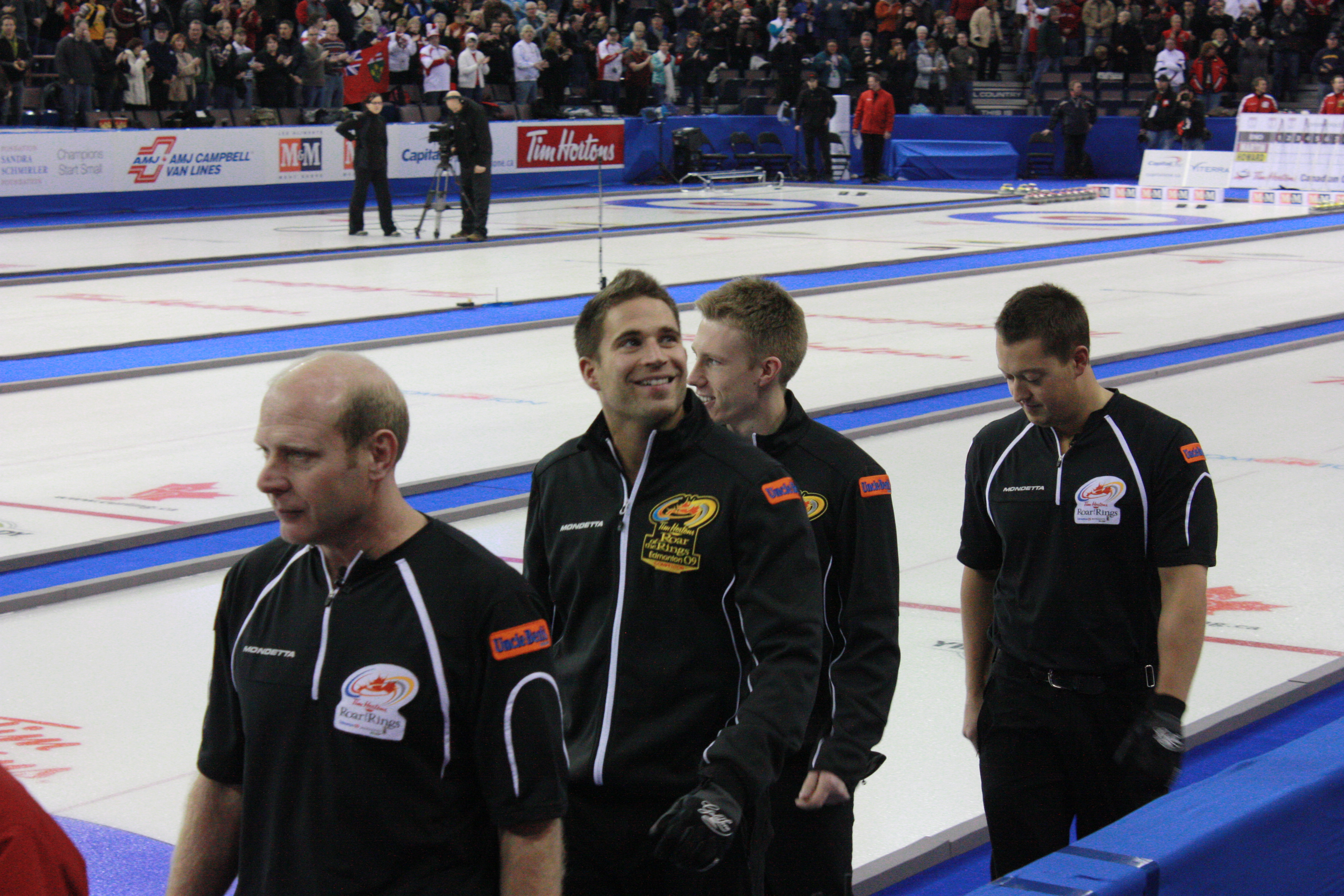
From left: Martin, John Morris, Marc Kennedy, Ben Hebert at the 2009 Canadian Olympic Curling Trials

Season	Skip	Third	Second	Lead	Events
1984–85	Kevin Martin	Richard Feeney	Dan Petryk	Michael Berger	1985 CJCC
1985–86	Kevin Martin	Richard Feeney	Dan Petryk	Michael Berger	1986 WJCC
1988–87	Kevin Martin	Rob Sand	Lyle Horneland	Ken Harke	1987 CCAA
1987–88	Kevin Martin	Richard Feeney	Dan Petryk	Ralph Brust	
1989–90	Kevin Martin	Kevin Park	Dan Petryk	Brian Nolin	
1990–91	Kevin Martin	Kevin Park	Dan Petryk	Don Bartlett	1991 Alta., Brier, WCC
1991–92	Kevin Martin	Kevin Park	Dan Petryk	Don Bartlett	1992 OG, Alta., Brier
1992–93	Kevin Martin	Brad Hannah	Dan Petryk	Ken Tralnberg	
1993–94	Kevin Martin	Kevin Park	Ken Tralnberg	Don Bartlett	1994 Alta.
1994–95	Kevin Martin	Kevin Park	James Pahl	Don Bartlett	1995 Alta., Brier
1995–96	Kevin Martin	Randy Ferbey (Note: Ferbey left the team in December and was replaced by Broda, who threw second stones. Walchuk was promoted to third.); Don Walchuk	Don Walchuk; Shawn Broda	Don Bartlett	1996 Alta., Brier
1996–97	Kevin Martin	Don Walchuk	Rudy Ramcharan	Don Bartlett	1997 Alta., Brier, WCC
1997–98	Kevin Martin	Don Walchuk	Rudy Ramcharan	Don Bartlett	1997 COCT
1998–99	Kevin Martin	Don Walchuk	Rudy Ramcharan	Don Bartlett	
1999–00	Kevin Martin	Don Walchuk	Carter Rycroft	Don Bartlett	2000 Alta., Brier
2000–01	Kevin Martin	Don Walchuk	Carter Rycroft	Don Bartlett	2001 Alta.
2001–02	Kevin Martin	Don Walchuk	Carter Rycroft	Don Bartlett	2001 COCT, 2002 OG
2002–03	Kevin Martin	Don Walchuk	Carter Rycroft	Don Bartlett	
2003–04	Kevin Martin	Don Walchuk	Carter Rycroft	Don Bartlett	2004 Alta.
2004–05	Kevin Martin	Don Walchuk	Carter Rycroft	Don Bartlett	2005 CC
2005–06	Kevin Martin	Don Walchuk	Carter Rycroft	Don Bartlett	2005 COCT, 2006 Alta., CC, Brier
2006–07	Kevin Martin	John Morris	Marc Kennedy	Ben Hebert	2007 Alta., CC, Brier
2007–08	Kevin Martin	John Morris	Marc Kennedy	Ben Hebert	2008 Alta., CC, Brier, WCC
2008–09	Kevin Martin	John Morris	Marc Kennedy	Ben Hebert	2009 Alta., CC, Brier, WCC
2009–10	Kevin Martin	John Morris	Marc Kennedy	Ben Hebert	2009 COCT, 2010 OG
2010–11	Kevin Martin	John Morris	Marc Kennedy	Ben Hebert	2010 CC, 2011 Alta., Brier
2011–12	Kevin Martin	John Morris	Marc Kennedy	Ben Hebert	2011 CC, 2012 Alta.
2012–13	Kevin Martin	John Morris	Marc Kennedy	Ben Hebert	2012 CC, 2013 Alta., Brier
2013–14	Kevin Martin	David Nedohin	Marc Kennedy	Ben Hebert	2013 COCT, 2014 Alta.
2013–14	Kevin Martin	Marc Kennedy	David Nedohin	Ben Hebert	

=== Awards ===
- World Junior Curling Championships All-Star skip: 1986
- Hec Gervais Award (Brier MVP): 1997, 2009
- Brier Shot of the Week Award: 1997
- Brier first all-star team skip: 1996, 2008, 2009
- Brier second all-star team skip: 2006, 2007
- World Curling Tour (WCT) MVP: 2008–09
- WCT Team of the Year: 2008–09
- WCT MVP: 2009–10

== Personal life ==
Martin is married to Shauna Martin and has three children, Karrick, Kalycia, and Mykaela. Karrick curls competitively, most recently as the alternate for his father at the 2013 Tim Hortons Brier, and as the lead for Brendan Bottcher, winner of the 2017 Alberta men's championship to represent the province at the 2017 Tim Hortons Brier, with Kevin as coach.

Martin is the owner and operator of Kevin's Rocks-n-Racquets, a curling supply shop located at the Saville Sports Centre. He has owned his own business since 1991. Prior to that, he was an ice maker.

Martin has a degree in petroleum engineering technology from the Northern Alberta Institute of Technology (NAIT), which he earned upon graduating in 1987. He also curled at NAIT under the tutelage of coach Jules Owchar, who has coached Martin since they met at NAIT. Martin also received an honorary bachelor's degree in technology management in 2010, and received the Alumni Award of Distinction in 2011 for his achievements in curling.

Martin is very invested in building the future of the game of curling. He regularly runs curling academies at the Saville Sports Centre. Each summer he organizes a curling camp for junior players called the "Kevin Martin Summer Curling Academy". The Academy is targeted at elite junior players looking to take their game to a higher level. Martin has also created a mobile app with purchasable content, which includes drills and tips aimed at helping curlers improve their game.
