= John Morris (curler) =

Canadian curler and Olympic gold medallist

- Curler
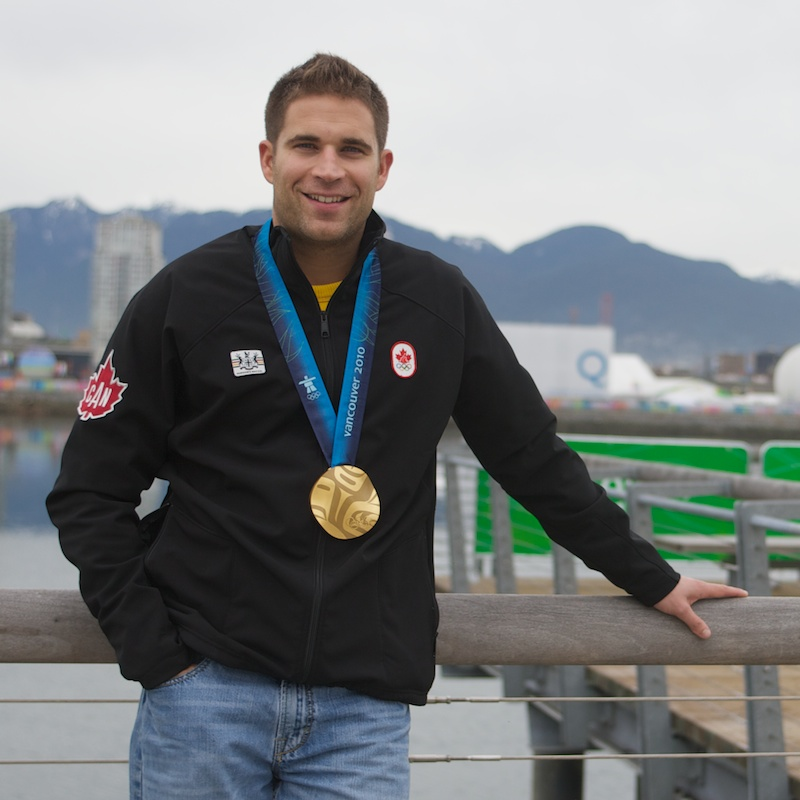
- Born: December 16, 1978 (age 47); Winnipeg, Manitoba, Canada
- Height: 188 cm (6 ft 2 in)

Team
- Curling club: The Glencoe Club, Calgary, AB; Canmore G&CC; Canmore, AB

Curling career
- Member Association: Ontario (1993-2003; 2020); Alberta (2003-2013; 2014-2016; 2020-present); British Columbia (2013-2014; 2016-2018)
- Brier: 13 (2002, 2007, 2008, 2009, 2011, 2013, 2014, 2015, 2016, 2017, 2020, 2021, 2022)
- World Championship: 3 (2008, 2009, 2015)
- Olympic: 3 (2010, 2018, 2022)
- Top CTRS ranking: 1st (2006–07, 2007–08, 2009–10, 2010–11)
- Grand Slam victories: 11 (2004 Players', 2007 Canadian Open (Jan.), 2007 National (Mar.), 2007 Players', 2007 Canadian Open (Dec.), 2007 National (Dec.), 2010 Canadian Open, 2010 Players', 2010 National (Dec.), 2011 Players', 2017 Elite 10)
Medal record
Men's Curling
Representing Canada
Olympic Games
Gold medal – first place	2010 Vancouver	Men's
Gold medal – first place	2018 Pyeongchang	Mixed doubles
World Championships
Gold medal – first place	2008 Grand Forks	Men's
Silver medal – second place	2009 Moncton	Men's
Bronze medal – third place	2015 Halifax	Men's
Tim Hortons Brier
Gold medal – first place	2015 Calgary	Men's
World Junior Championships
Gold medal – first place	1998 Thunder Bay	Men's
Gold medal – first place	1999 Östersund	Men's
Representing Ontario
Nokia Brier
Silver medal – second place	2002 Calgary	Men's
Representing Alberta
Canadian Olympic Trials
Gold medal – first place	2009 Edmonton	Men's
Bronze medal – third place	2005 Halifax	Men's
Bronze medal – third place	2021 Saskatoon	Men's
Canadian Mixed Doubles Olympic Trials
Gold medal – first place	2018 Portage la Prairie	Mixed doubles
Tim Hortons Brier
Gold medal – first place	2008 Winnipeg	Men's
Gold medal – first place	2009 Calgary	Men's
Silver medal – second place	2022 Lethbridge	Men's
Canadian Mixed Doubles Championships
Silver medal – second place	2017 Saskatoon
Bronze medal – third place	2014 Ottawa
Bronze medal – third place	2021 Calgary
Representing British Columbia
Canadian Olympic Trials
Silver medal – second place	2013 Winnipeg	Men's
Tim Hortons Brier
Silver medal – second place	2014 Kamloops	Men's
Representing (Alberta) Wild Card
Tim Hortons Brier
Silver medal – second place	2021 Calgary

John C. Morris (born December 16, 1978; nicknamed "Johnny Mo") is a Canadian curler, and two-time Olympic gold medallist from Canmore, Alberta. Morris played third for the Kevin Martin team until April 24, 2013. Morris, author of the book Fit to Curl, is the son of Maureen and Earle Morris, inventor of the "Stabilizer" curling broom. Morris grew up in Gloucester, Ontario (now part of Ottawa) and at the age of five began curling at the Navy Curling Club.

== Career ==
=== Junior career ===
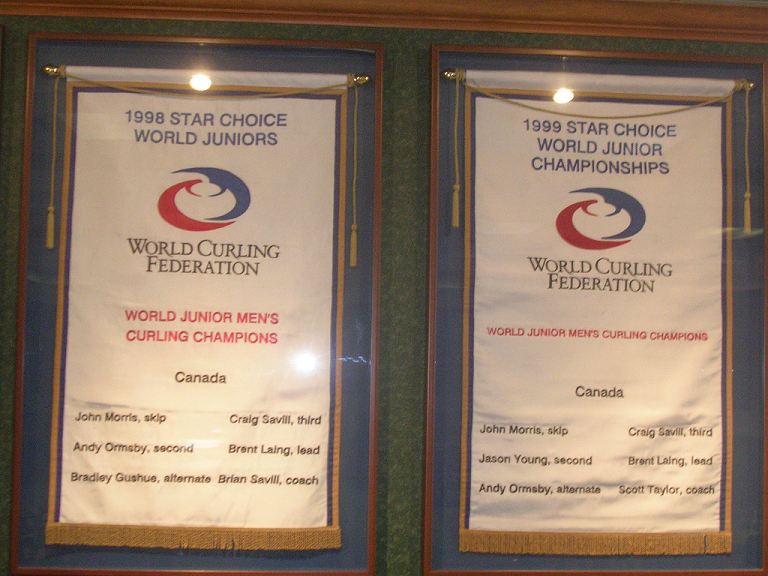
Morris' 1998 and 1999 World Junior Championship banners at the Ottawa Curling Club

As a junior curler, Morris skipped his Ottawa Curling Club rink to three-straight Ontario provincial junior Men's titles from 1997 to 1999, and won the 1998 and 1999 Canadian and World Junior Championships, setting records for most wins by a skip along the way.

Morris and his rink of Craig Savill, Matt St. Louis and Mark Homan would represent Ontario at the 1997 Canadian Junior Curling Championships. His team would finish the round robin with a 7–5 record, in a five-way tie for third place. He would go on to beat British Columbia's T. J. Perepolkin, New Brunswick's Tommy Sullivan in tiebreakers, the Northwest Territories' Jamie Koe in the semifinal before losing to Alberta's Ryan Keane in the final.

The following season, Morris brought in a new front end for his junior team, adding Andy Ormsby and Brent Laing to replace St. Louis and Homan. At the 1998 Canadian Junior Curling Championships, he led his Ontario Team to a 9–3 round robin record in a 4-way tie for first place. The team beat New Brunswick's Rob Heffernan in a tiebreaker before beating Manitoba's Mike McEwen in the semifinal and then Alberta's Carter Rycroft in the final. Their win qualified the team to represent Canada at the 1998 World Junior Curling Championships. There, the team would go 9–0 in the round robin before defeating Switzerland's Ralph Stöckli in the semifinal and Garry MacKay of Scotland in the final to win the gold medal.

For their third championship run, Team Morris replaced Ormsby with Jason Young at second. At the 1999 Canadian Junior Curling Championships, Morris led the team to an 8–4 round robin record in a three-way tie for second. He again had to fight through a tiebreaker to win the championship, downing Alberta's Jeff Erickson before defeating Newfoundland's Brad Gushue in the semifinal and British Columbia's Jeff Richard in the final. At the 1999 World Junior Curling Championships, he led Canada to an 8–1 round robin record (first place) and beat Sweden's Patric Håkansson in the semifinal and Christian Haller of Switzerland in the final to win the gold medal.

In addition to his provincial junior titles, Morris won a provincial junior mixed title in 1999 with Jacqueline Smith, Brent Laing and Chrissy Cadorin.

=== Early men's career in Ontario (1999–2003) ===
After living in Ottawa, Morris moved to Southwestern Ontario to attend Wilfrid Laurier University and curled out of the Stayner Granite Club in Stayner, Ontario. Despite the move, his team remained nearly intact, with Young being replaced by Andy Ormsby. In their first season after juniors, the team entered the playdowns for the 2000 Ontario Nokia Cup, the provincial men's championship, but lost in regionals.

In 2000 Ormsby left the team and was replaced by Joe Frans, who would become the team's third, moving Savill to play second. The team won a couple of tour events and made it to their first provincial championship, the 2001 Ontario Nokia Cup. After finishing the round robin with a 6–3 record, Morris defeated Team Glenn Howard in the semifinal before losing to Team Wayne Middaugh in the final.

The team qualified for the 2001 Canadian Olympic Curling Trials, where Morris garnered national attention after a difficult loss to Russ Howard. His team would finish the event with a 5–4 record, missing the playoffs. With many of the province's top teams ignoring the Brier playdowns in 2002 to focus on the new Grand Slam of Curling, Morris and his team had an easy path at the 2002 Ontario provincial championships. The team went 8–1 after the round robin and beat Team Phil Daniel twice to win his first provincial title, qualifying him for the 2002 Nokia Brier. At the diluted Brier, Morris led his rink to an 8–3 round robin record, in second place. In the playoffs, they lost to Alberta's Randy Ferbey in the 1 vs. 2 game but rebounded to defeat New Brunswick's Russ Howard in the semifinal. In the final, the team lost to Alberta in a rematch.

In 2003, the Morris rink would make it to the finals at the inaugural Canada Cup of Curling, where they lost to Randy Ferbey. The team played in another diluted provincial championship that year, the 2003 Ontario Nokia Cup. There, his rink finished the round robin in 2nd place with a 7–2 record. In the playoffs, they lost to the first-place Bryan Cochrane rink and then to Peter Corner in the semifinal. The team finished the season at the 2003 Players' Championship Grand Slam, where they lost to Jeff Stoughton in the final. After the season, Morris moved to Calgary, where he played out of the Calgary Winter Club.

=== Move to Calgary (2003–2006) ===
After moving to Calgary, Morris assembled a new team, which would consist of Kevin Koe, Marc Kennedy and Paul Moffatt. The team had some success on the Tour, winning a few events, including the 2004 Players' Championship Grand Slam. The team would play three seasons together, never winning a provincial championship, having to compete against teams like Randy Ferbey and Kevin Martin. The team would play in the 2005 Canadian Olympic Curling Trials, where they would finish the round robin with a 6–3 record before losing to Jeff Stoughton in the semifinal.

=== Joining forces with "K-Mart" (2006–2013) ===
In 2006, Morris joined forces with veteran skip Kevin Martin on a four-year plan aimed at winning a gold medal at the 2010 Winter Olympics. The team won the 2007 Kia Cup, the provincial championship, defeating Morris' former teammate, Kevin Koe in the final. On February 27, 2007, just four days before the 2007 Tim Hortons Brier, Morris was hit by a car. He was knocked unconscious but went on to compete at the 2007 Tim Hortons Brier, where Alberta placed fourth after losing to Jeff Stoughton in the 3–4 page playoff. Morris later recovered by winning all-star third in the tournament. In their first season together on the tour, the team dominated, winning three of the four Grand Slam events, the Canadian Open, The National and the Players' Championship.

After winning the 2008 Boston Pizza Cup provincial championship, Morris and the Kevin Martin (Alberta) rink returned to the 2008 Brier in Winnipeg. Roughly a week before the Brier, Morris broke his right hand and subsequently had to wear a special brace while sweeping. The event sidelined Morris from playing in the 2008 Canada Cup of Curling, where he was replaced by Kevin Park. At the Brier, the Martin team went 11–0 in the round robin, and won their 1–2 playoff game to make the finals. In a game marred by tricky ice and missed opportunities, Alberta won by a score of 5–4. Morris was named MVP of the finals after curling 90%. At the following 2008 World Men's Curling Championship, Morris led all players with a round robin percentage of 90% and helped team Canada to a World Championship crown, the first for any player on the team. On the tour that season, the team won two Grand Slams, the Canadian Open and the National.

The following season, the team won the 2009 Boston Pizza Cup and represented Alberta at the 2009 Tim Hortons Brier, where the team won their second straight title. At the 2009 Ford World Men's Curling Championship, the team would lose in the final to Scotland's David Murdoch. Also, that season, the team would win the 2009 Canada Cup of Curling.

The team qualified for the 2009 Canadian Olympic Curling Trials, where Morris and Team Martin would win the right to represent Canada at the 2010 Winter Olympic Games. On February 27 at the Vancouver Olympics, Team Martin won the gold medal with a score of 6–3 in the final against Thomas Ulsrud of Norway. On the tour that season, the team would win the 2010 BDO Classic Canadian Open and the 2010 Players' Championship.

Morris represented Alberta at the 2011 Tim Hortons Brier with Team Martin after winning the provincials. They finished with a 9–2 win–loss record but dropped their page playoff game against Ontario's Glenn Howard and lost the bronze medal game against Brad Gushue of Newfoundland and Labrador. In Grand Slam play, the team would win the December 2010 National and the 2011 Players' Championship.

In the 2011–12 curling season, Morris and the rest of the team won the Canada Cup of Curling over Glenn Howard, giving them a berth into the 2013 Canadian Olympic Curling Trials. They participated in the 2012 Alberta provincials but struggled against Kevin Koe and Brock Virtue, eventually losing the semifinal to Virtue.

Team Martin was unable to defend their Canada Cup title in 2012, finishing outside of the playoffs. Morris subbed in as skip for an injured Martin at the Canadian Open of Curling and played with former teammate Joe Frans, finishing with a 2–3 win–loss record. After Martin recovered, the team went to the 2013 provincials, where a close win over Kevin Koe in the final gave them the right to represent the home team Alberta at the 2013 Tim Hortons Brier. The team went to the Players' Championship, where they finished with a 2–2 win–loss record, and they advanced to a tiebreaker, where they lost to John Epping. A few days after the conclusion of the Players' Championship, on 24 April 2013, Morris announced that he and Martin were parting ways. One week later, it was announced that Morris would join Jim Cotter and his team for the 2013–14 season.

=== Team changes and another Olympics (2013–2018) ===
Morris found immediate success with the Cotter rink, skipping the team (which also consisted of Tyrel Griffith and Rick Sawatsky) out of the Kelowna Curling Club, and throwing third rocks. The team qualified for the 2013 Canadian Olympic Curling Trials through the pre-trials event, only to lose in the final to the Brad Jacobs team that would go on to win the Olympic gold medal. Following that, the team went undefeated en route to winning the 2014 British Columbia provincial championship and the right to represent the province at the 2014 Tim Hortons Brier. This made Morris one of only three curlers to have played for three different provinces at the Brier, joining his father Earle and Ryan Fry. After posting a 9–2 round robin record, Morris' B.C. rink defeated Alberta (skipped by former teammate Kevin Koe) in the 1 vs. 2 game, before losing to Alberta in a rematch final, 10–5.

Rule changes implemented for the 2015 Tim Hortons Brier meant that for the first time defending Brier champions will be afforded an automatic entry in the following year's Brier. For the 2015 Brier, this entry would normally have gone to Koe; however, in the 2014 off-season, Koe announced he was leaving his team to form a new team. Under CCA rules, this left Koe's former teammates (Pat Simmons, Carter Rycroft and Nolan Thiessen) with the automatic entry for the 2015 Brier. Koe's former teammates subsequently recruited Morris to skip them, thus ensuring that Morris, despite being the 2014 Brier runner-up, would skip the first-ever Team Canada entry in a Brier.

After Team Canada started off 2–3, Morris approached third Pat Simmons with the idea that Simmons skip and Morris move to vice. The move paid off as the rink went on to win the Canadian championship; they won the bronze (third place) medal at the 2015 world championships in Halifax.

The Brier win in 2015 meant the team would return for the 2016 Tim Hortons Brier to represent Team Canada. The team would struggle at the event, missing the playoffs with a 6–5 record. They would disband after the season.

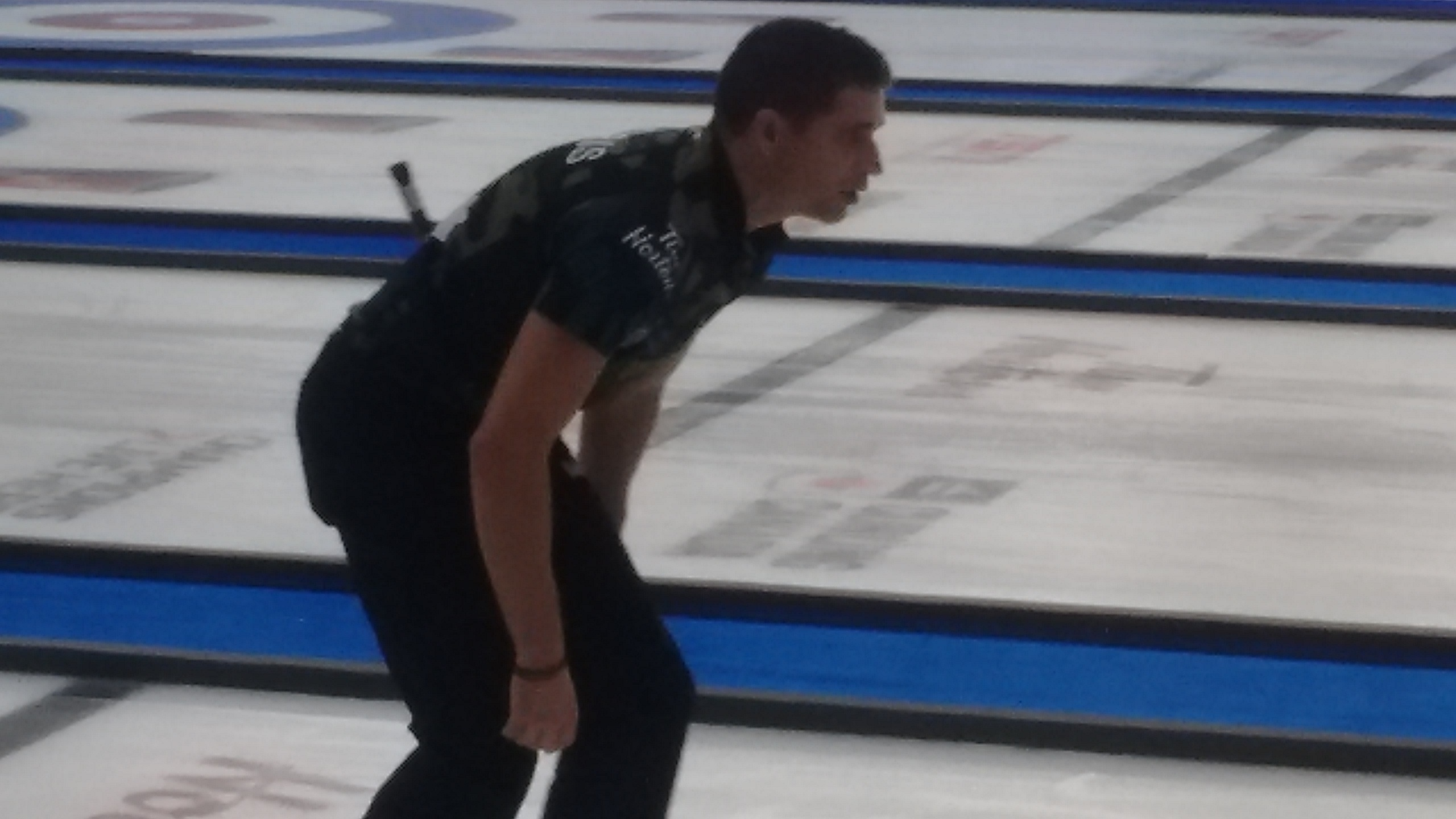
Morris at the 2016 Tim Hortons Brier in Ottawa.

In 2016, Morris returned to play with Jim Cotter's British Columbia-based team, skipping the rink while Cotter threw fourth stones. The team would win the 2017 belairdirect BC Men's Curling Championship, giving the team the right to represent British Columbia at the 2017 Tim Hortons Brier. Morris led the team to a 7–4 record, missing the playoffs. On the tour, the team won one Grand Slam event, the 2017 Elite 10.

The team began the 2017–18 season with Morris throwing last rocks and skipping and Cotter at third. The team qualified for the 2017 Olympic Pre-Trials, which the team qualified out of despite a 3–3 pool record. This put the team into the 2017 Canadian Olympic Curling Trials, where the team would struggle. The team experimented with Morris throwing third again, but it was to no avail, and the team finished with a 3–5 round robin record.

In 2018 Morris joined up with Kaitlyn Lawes to win the 2018 Canadian Mixed Doubles Curling Olympic Trials to return to the Winter Olympics, this time in Pyeongchang, South Korea, where the mixed doubles made its debut. Morris had been playing with Rachel Homan in pre-trials events but had to find a new partner after Homan became ineligible when her women's team won the right to represent Canada in the Olympic women's event. Morris and Lawes won the gold, defeating Switzerland in the final.

=== Post Olympics (2018–2020) ===
After the Olympics, Morris said he planned to focus on the mixed doubles discipline rather than the team event. He and Lawes committed to playing for at least two more seasons together. However, the two only competed together for one season in 2018–19, winning the Canad Inns Mixed Doubles Classic and making the quarterfinals in the Qualico Mixed Doubles Classic. They were unable to compete at the 2019 Canadian Mixed Doubles Curling Championship, as Lawes had sustained an injury at the 2019 Scotties Tournament of Hearts. During the 2019–20 curling season, Morris played with several different mixed doubles partners, placing 2nd in the Colorado Curling Cup with Kira Brunton, placing 3rd in the MadTown DoubleDown and 5th in the Canad Inns Mixed Doubles Championship with Jolene Campbell, placing 3rd in the Brantford Mixed Doubles Cashspiel with Sarah Anderson, and winning the Qualico Mixed Doubles Classic with Rachel Homan.

After John Epping and his rink won the 2020 Ontario Tankard, they announced they would be taking Morris as their alternate to the 2020 Tim Hortons Brier. At the Brier, the team finished the championship pool with a 7–4 record and in a four-way tie for fourth place. They defeated Team Wild Card (Mike McEwen) in the first tiebreaker before losing to Northern Ontario (Brad Jacobs) in the second and being eliminated from contention. Morris got to play in the last two ends of the second tiebreaker against Jacobs, replacing Fry as they were already down 6–3 without the hammer.

=== Joining Koe (2020–2022) ===
On March 16, 2020, Team Kevin Koe announced they would be parting ways with their second Colton Flasch. The following day, the team announced they would be adding Morris to their lineup as their new second. Morris spared for the team at the 2019 Tour Challenge Grand Slam event, where they made it to the semifinals. Team Koe began the 2020–21 season at the McKee Homes Fall Curling Classic, where they lost in the quarterfinals. Their next three events included a semifinal finish at the Ashley HomeStore Curling Classic and two runner-up finishes at both the ATB Banff Classic and the ATB Okotoks Classic. Due to the COVID-19 pandemic in Alberta, the 2021 provincial championship was cancelled. As the reigning provincials champions, Team Brendan Bottcher was chosen to represent Alberta at the 2021 Tim Hortons Brier. However, due to many provinces cancelling their provincial championships due to the COVID-19 pandemic in Canada, Curling Canada added three Wild Card teams to the national championship, which were based on the CTRS standings from the 2019–20 season. Because Team Koe ranked 6th on the CTRS and kept at least three of their four players together for the 2020–21 season, they got the second Wild Card spot at the 2021 Brier in Calgary, Alberta. At the 2021 Tim Hortons Brier, the team finished with a 10–2 round robin record in first place. This gave them a bye to the final, where they played Team Alberta, skipped by Brendan Bottcher in a re-match of the 2019 Brier final. This time Bottcher won, with the Koe rink taking home the silver medal. The team ended their season at the final two Slams of the season, the 2021 Champions Cup and the 2021 Players' Championship, reaching the semifinals of the Champions Cup.

The Koe rink won their first two events of the 2021–22 season, the ATB Okotoks Classic and the IG Wealth Management Western Showdown. At the first two Slams of the season, they reached the quarterfinals of the 2021 Masters and the semifinals of the 2021 National. They then competed in the 2021 Canadian Olympic Curling Trials, held November 20 to 28 in Saskatoon, Saskatchewan. Team Koe qualified for the Trials via their CTRS points as they finished in second place through the 2018–19 season. Through the round robin, Morris and teammates Kevin Koe, B. J. Neufeld and Ben Hebert finished with a 6–2 record, only suffering losses to the Brad Gushue and Brad Jacobs rinks. This record earned them a place in the semifinal game, where they faced the Jacobs' rink. Despite shooting a 96% game, the Koe rink lost the semifinal game 8–3 as Team Jacobs scored two four enders, ending the game early. In the new year, the team went undefeated to claim the 2022 Boston Pizza Cup. This earned them the right to represent Alberta at the 2022 Tim Hortons Brier where they finished with a 7–1 round robin record. They then won the seeding game against Saskatchewan's Colton Flasch and beat Team Canada's Brendan Bottcher in the 1 vs. 2 game to qualify directly for the final. There, they faced the Gushue rink. After a tight game all the way through, Team Gushue scored one in the extra end to win the game 9–8 and hand Team Koe their second consecutive Brier silver medal. They ended their season with two more playoff finishes at the 2022 Players' Championship and the 2022 Champions Cup, reaching the final of the latter.

In March 2022, Team Koe announced that they would be disbanding. With the announcement, Morris also stated that he would be retiring from competitive men's curling.

=== Retirement and Coaching ===
Morris made his international coaching debut at the 2021 Olympic Qualification Event, coaching the Australian mixed doubles team where they qualified for the 2022 Winter Olympics, the first an Australian Curling Team has ever done so.

In April 2024 it was announced that Morris, fellow Canadian Olympic Curler Jennifer Jones, and Pro Football Hall of Famer Jared Allen were associated with the sports business venture The Curling Group, which purchased ownership and operations of the Grand Slam of Curling series from Sportsnet.

=== Grand Slam record ===
Key
C	Champion
F	Lost in Final
SF	Lost in Semifinal
QF	Lost in Quarterfinals
R16	Lost in the round of 16
Q	Did not advance to playoffs
T2	Played in Tier 2 event
DNP	Did not participate in event
N/A	Not a Grand Slam event that season

Event	2002–03	2003–04	2004–05	2005–06	2006–07	2007–08	2008–09	2009–10	2010–11	2011–12	2012–13	2013–14	2014–15	2015–16	2016–17	2017–18	2018–19	2019–20	2020–21	2021–22	2022–23	2023–24	2024–25	2025–26
Elite 10	N/A	N/A	N/A	N/A	N/A	N/A	N/A	N/A	N/A	N/A	N/A	N/A	DNP	DNP	C	DNP	DNP	N/A	N/A	N/A	N/A	N/A	N/A	N/A
Masters	DNP	QF	Q	QF	SF	QF	QF	QF	QF	SF	SF	DNP	Q	Q	Q	Q	DNP	DNP	N/A	QF	DNP	DNP	DNP	DNP
Tour Challenge	N/A	N/A	N/A	N/A	N/A	N/A	N/A	N/A	N/A	N/A	N/A	N/A	N/A	DNP	QF	Q	DNP	SF (Note: Morris spared for B. J. Neufeld, who was on paternity leave.)	N/A	N/A	DNP	DNP	DNP	DNP
The National	DNP	DNP	QF	Q	C	C	SF	Q	C	F	SF	DNP	QF	QF	QF	Q	DNP	DNP	N/A	SF	DNP	DNP	DNP	Q
Canadian Open	DNP	DNP	SF	F	C	C	F	C	QF	QF	DNP	Q	Q	Q	SF	Q	DNP	DNP	N/A	N/A	DNP	DNP	DNP	DNP
Players'	F	C	Q	QF	C	F	SF	C	C	SF	Q	DNP	DNP	DNP	Q	DNP	DNP	N/A	Q	QF	DNP	DNP	DNP	DNP
Champions Cup	N/A	N/A	N/A	N/A	N/A	N/A	N/A	N/A	N/A	N/A	N/A	N/A	N/A	DNP	QF	Q	QF (Note: Morris spared for John Shuster, who was competing at the 2019 World Mixed Doubles Curling Championship.)	N/A	SF	F	DNP	N/A	N/A	N/A

== Personal life ==
Morris, a certified personal trainer, currently serves as a full-time firefighter for the Chestermere & Rocky View Fire County Service, living in Canmore, Alberta. Drawing on his degree in Kinesiology from Wilfrid Laurier University, in 2009 Morris co-authored the book Fit to Curl, a sport-specific training manual. As of 2016, Morris is a Certified Holistic Nutritionist. Morris attended high school at Colonel By Secondary School in Gloucester, Ontario and played hockey, softball, volleyball, soccer and little league baseball in his youth. In 2016, he graduated from the Chef's Training Program at the Natural Gourmet Institute in New York City. Morris has been a 'big brother' with Calgary and the area BBBS since 2011.

Morris was also an ambassador at the 2020 Youth Olympic Games in Lausanne, Switzerland, where he helped lead and inspire the next generation of young athletes. Morris is the third generation of his family to compete in the Brier. As well as his father Earle, his great-grandfather Cliff McLachlan skipped Saskatchewan in the 1933 Macdonald Brier.

In 2010, Morris was featured by ET Canada in a Valentine's special as one of Canada's most eligible bachelors. However, he proposed to his girlfriend Maggie and the two had a son together in 2018. They had another child in 2019.

In his youth, Morris also played baseball and was on the team that lost the 1993 Canadian junior final.

== Teams ==
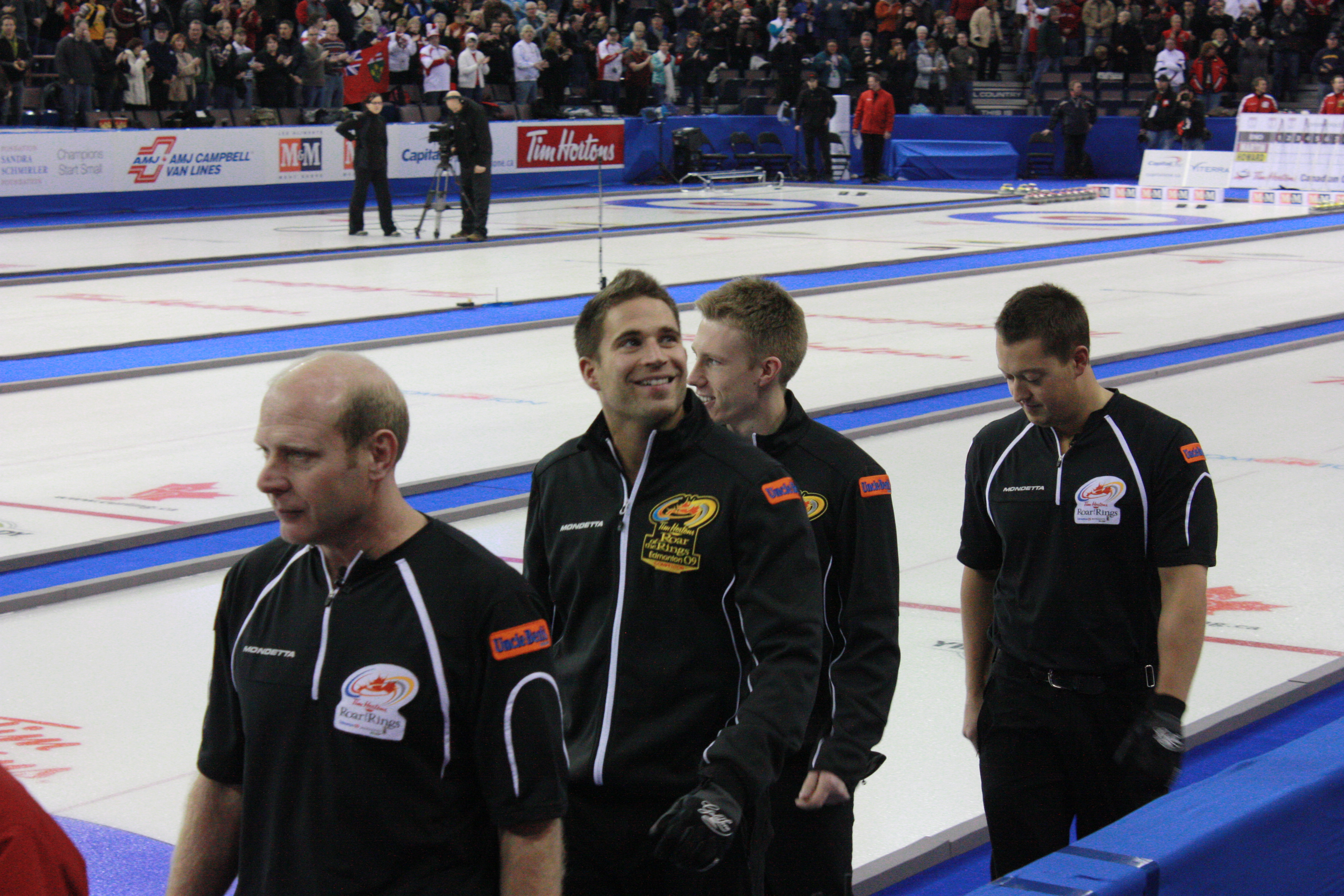
From left: Kevin Martin, Morris, Marc Kennedy, Ben Hebert

Season	Skip	Third	Second	Lead	Events
1993–94	John Morris	Mark Homan	Mike Lilly	Craig Savill / Damien Boland	
1996–97	John Morris	Craig Savill	Matt St. Louis	Mark Homan	1997 CJCC
1997–98	John Morris	Craig Savill	Andy Ormsby	Brent Laing	1998 CJC, WJCC
1998–99	John Morris	Craig Savill	Jason Young	Brent Laing	1999 CJCC, WJCC
1999-00	John Morris	Craig Savill	Andy Ormsby	Brent Laing	
2000–01	John Morris	Joe Frans	Craig Savill	Brent Laing	2001 Ont.
2001–02	John Morris	Joe Frans	Craig Savill	Brent Laing	2001 COCT, 2002 Ont., Brier
2002–03	John Morris	Joe Frans	Craig Savill	Brent Laing	2003 Ont., CC
2003–04	John Morris	Kevin Koe	Marc Kennedy	Paul Moffatt	2004 Alta., CC
2004–05	John Morris	Kevin Koe	Marc Kennedy	Paul Moffatt	2005 Alta., CC
2005–06	John Morris	Kevin Koe	Marc Kennedy	Paul Moffatt	2005 COCT, 2006 Alta., CC
2006–07	Kevin Martin	John Morris	Marc Kennedy	Ben Hebert	2007 Alta., CC, Brier
2007–08	Kevin Martin	John Morris	Marc Kennedy	Ben Hebert	2008 Alta., Brier, WCC
2008–09	Kevin Martin	John Morris	Marc Kennedy	Ben Hebert	2009 Alta., CC, Brier, WCC
2009–10	Kevin Martin	John Morris	Marc Kennedy	Ben Hebert	2009 COCT, 2010 OG
2010–11	Kevin Martin	John Morris	Marc Kennedy	Ben Hebert	2010 CC, 2011 Alta., Brier
2011–12	Kevin Martin	John Morris	Marc Kennedy	Ben Hebert	2011 CC
2012–13	Kevin Martin	John Morris	Marc Kennedy	Ben Hebert	2012 CC, 2013 Alta., Brier
2013–14	Jim Cotter (fourth)	John Morris (skip)	Tyrel Griffith	Rick Sawatsky	2013 RTTR, COCT, 2014 BC, Brier
2014–15	John Morris / Pat Simmons	Pat Simmons / John Morris	Carter Rycroft; Scott Bailey	Nolan Thiessen	2014 CC, 2015 Brier, WCC
2015–16	Pat Simmons	John Morris	Carter Rycroft	Nolan Thiessen	2015 CC, 2016 Brier
2016–17	Jim Cotter (fourth)	John Morris (skip)	Tyrel Griffith	Rick Sawatsky	2017 BC, Brier
2017–18	Jim Cotter (fourth) / John Morris	John Morris (skip) / Jim Cotter	Catlin Schneider	Tyrel Griffith	2017 RTTR, COCT
2020–21	Kevin Koe	B. J. Neufeld	John Morris	Ben Hebert	2021 Brier
2021–22	Kevin Koe	B. J. Neufeld	John Morris	Ben Hebert	2021 COCT, 2022 Alta., Brier
2023-24	John Morris	Braeden Moskowy	Dustin Kidby	DJ Kidby	

== Awards ==
- Canadian Junior Curling Championships: All-Star Skip - 1998 and 1999
- World Junior Curling Championships: All-Star Skip - 1999
- Canadian Citizenship Award - 1999
- Brier: First Team All-Star, Third - 2007, 2008, 2014
- Brier: Second Team All-Star, Skip - 2002
- Brier: Second Team All-Star, Third - 2009
- Brier: Second Team All-Star, Second - 2022
- Brier: Hec Gervais Most Valuable Player Award - 2008
