= 2010 BDO Classic Canadian Open =

Grand Slam of Curling event

The 2010 BDO Classic Canadian Open was the third Grand Slam of Curling tournament of the 2009-10 curling season. It was held January 20-24 at the MTS Centre in Winnipeg, Manitoba.

Kevin Martin was the winning skip.

== Teams ==
Skip	Third	Second	Lead	Locale
Ted Appelman	Tom Appelman	Brandon Klassen	Brendan Melnyk	(Alberta) Edmonton
Kerry Burtnyk	Don Walchuk	Richard Daneault	Garth Smith	(Manitoba) Winnipeg
David Nedohin (fourth)	Randy Ferbey (skip)	Scott Pfeifer	Marcel Rocque	(Alberta) Edmonton
Jason Gunnlaugson	Justin Richter	Braden Zawada	Tyler Forrest	(Manitoba) Beausejour
Brad Gushue	Mark Nichols	Ryan Fry	Jamie Korab	(Newfoundland and Labrador) St. John's
Glenn Howard	Richard Hart	Brent Laing	Craig Savill	(Ontario) Coldwater
Kevin Koe	Blake MacDonald	Carter Rycroft	Nolan Thiessen	(Alberta) Edmonton
Kevin Martin	John Morris	Marc Kennedy	Ben Hebert	(Alberta) Edmonton
Dale Matchett	Ryan Werenich	Jeff Gorda	Shawn Kaufman	(Ontario) Bradford
Mike McEwen	B. J. Neufeld	Matt Wozniak	Denni Neufeld	(Manitoba) Winnipeg
Jean-Michel Ménard	Martin Crête	Éric Sylvain	Jean Gagnon	(Quebec) Gatineau
Wayne Middaugh	Jon Mead	John Epping	Scott Bailey	(Ontario) Islington
Chris Schille	Jeff Erickson	Reid Carruthers	D. J. Kidby	(Alberta) Edmonton
John Shuster	Jason Smith	Jeff Isaacson	John Benton	(United States) Duluth
Pat Simmons	Gerry Adam	Jeff Sharp	Steve Laycock	(Saskatchewan) Davidson
Jeff Stoughton	Kevin Park	Rob Fowler	Steve Gould	(Manitoba) Winnipeg
Thomas Ulsrud	Torger Nergård	Christoffer Svae	Håvard Vad Petersson	(Norway) Oslo
Jim Cotter (fourth)	Bob Ursel (skip)	Kevin Folk	Rick Sawatsky	(British Columbia) Kelowna

== Draws ==
Group A	W	L
(Ontario) Howard	5	0
(Manitoba) McEwen	3	2
(Manitoba) Stoughton	3	2
(Saskatchewan) Simmons	2	3
(Ontario) Matchett	1	4
(United States) Shuster	1	4

Group B	W	L
(Alberta) Martin	5	0
(Ontario) Middaugh	4	1
(British Columbia) Ursel	3	2
(Quebec) Ménard	2	3
(Newfoundland and Labrador) Gushue	1	4
(Alberta) Schille	0	5

Group C	W	L
(Norway) Ulsrud	4	1
(Alberta) Ferbey	3	2
(Alberta) Appelman	2	3
(Manitoba) Burtnyk	2	3
(Manitoba) Gunnlaugson	2	3
(Alberta) Koe	2	3

== Playoffs ==
Quarter-Finals
(Ontario)	Glenn Howard	7
(British Columbia)	Bob Ursel	3
(Manitoba)	Jeff Stoughton	5
(Ontario)	Wayne Middaugh	6
(Alberta)	Kevin Martin	9
(Manitoba)	Mike McEwen	5
(Alberta)	Randy Ferbey	5
(Norway)	Thomas Ulsrud	6

Semi-Finals
(Ontario)	Glenn Howard	7
(Ontario)	Wayne Middaugh	2
(Alberta)	Kevin Martin	6
(Norway)	Thomas Ulsrud	3

Final
(Ontario)	Glenn Howard	4
(Alberta)	Kevin Martin	6
