= National (curling) =

Annual Grand Slam of Curling event

KIOTI GSOC Tahoe
- Established: 2002
- 2026 host city: Stateline, Nevada
- 2026 arena: Tahoe Blue Event Center
- Men's purse: CAD$200,000
- Women's purse: CAD$200,000

Current champions (2026)
- Men: (Alberta) Brad Jacobs
- Women: (Switzerland) Alina Pätz

Current edition
- 2026 GSOC National

The National is a curling tournament that is one of the five events that are part of the Grand Slam of Curling tour, and one of its four "majors".

The event was re-branded in 2025 to the KIOTI GSOC Tahoe to reflect the event being held outside of Canada. The 2004–05 event was also re-branded as the BDO Curling Classic.

== Format ==
Beginning in 2022, the event features 16 men's and 16 women's teams. The top 16 (or 15 if there's a sponsors exemption) teams on the World Curling Federation's Order of Merit qualify. In some cases a "sponsors exemption" is permitted, in which a local team is picked to compete. The 16 teams are divided into four groups of four teams, and the top eight teams overall advance to a single elimination playoff. In 2021, the event was a 16 team triple knockout event before the 8 team playoff. From 2015 to 2019, the event had 15 teams divided into three groups of five teams. From 2007 to 2014, the event had three pools of six teams each.

== Past champions ==
=== Men ===
Year	Winning team	Runner-up team	Location	Purse (CAD)
2002 M&M Meat Shops National	(Ontario) Glenn Howard, Richard Hart, Collin Mitchell, Jason Mitchell	(British Columbia) Greg McAulay, Brent Pierce, Bryan Miki, Jody Sveistrup	Sault Ste. Marie, Ontario	$100,000
2003 National	(Quebec) Martin Ferland, Pierre Charette (skip), Michel Ferland, Marco Berthelot	(Ontario) Glenn Howard, Richard Hart, Collin Mitchell, Jason Mitchell	Humboldt, Saskatchewan	$100,000
2004 National (Jan.)	(Ontario) Glenn Howard, Richard Hart, Collin Mitchell, Jason Mitchell	(Manitoba) Jeff Stoughton, Jon Mead, Garry Van Den Berghe, Steve Gould	Prince Albert, Saskatchewan	$100,000
2004 BDO Curling Classic (Nov.)	(Alberta) Kevin Martin, Don Walchuk, Carter Rycroft, Don Bartlett	(Manitoba) Jeff Stoughton, Jon Mead, Garry Van Den Berghe, Steve Gould	Hamilton, Ontario	$100,000
2005 National	(Ontario) Wayne Middaugh, Peter Corner, Phil Loevenmark, Scott Bailey	(Saskatchewan) Pat Simmons, Jeff Sharp, Ben Hebert, Steve Laycock	Port Hawkesbury, Nova Scotia	$100,000
2007 National (Mar.)	(Alberta) Kevin Martin, John Morris, Marc Kennedy, Ben Hebert	(Alberta) Blake MacDonald, Kevin Koe (skip), Carter Rycroft, Nolan Thiessen	Port Hawkesbury, Nova Scotia	$100,000
2007 National (Dec.)	(Alberta) Kevin Martin, John Morris, Brent Laing, Ben Hebert	(Alberta) Blake MacDonald, Kevin Koe (skip), Carter Rycroft, Nolan Thiessen	Port Hawkesbury, Nova Scotia	$100,000
2008 National	(Ontario) Wayne Middaugh, Jon Mead, John Epping, Scott Bailey*	(Newfoundland and Labrador) Brad Gushue, Mark Nichols, Ryan Fry, Jamie Korab	Quebec City, Quebec	$100,000
2010 National (Jan.)	(Newfoundland and Labrador) Brad Gushue, Mark Nichols, Ryan Fry, Jamie Korab	(Alberta) David Nedohin, Randy Ferbey (skip), Scott Pfeifer, Marcel Rocque	Guelph, Ontario	$100,000
2010 Swiss Chalet National (Dec.)	(Alberta) Kevin Martin, John Morris, Marc Kennedy, Ben Hebert	(Manitoba) Jeff Stoughton, Jon Mead, Reid Carruthers, Steve Gould	Vernon, British Columbia	$100,000
2012 Pomeroy Inn & Suites National	(Ontario) Glenn Howard, Wayne Middaugh, Brent Laing, Craig Savill	(Alberta) Kevin Martin, John Morris, Marc Kennedy, Ben Hebert	Dawson Creek, British Columbia	$100,000
2013 National	(Manitoba) Jeff Stoughton, Jon Mead, Reid Carruthers, Mark Nichols	(Manitoba) Mike McEwen, B. J. Neufeld, Matt Wozniak, Denni Neufeld	Port Hawkesbury, Nova Scotia	$100,000
2014 Syncrude National (Mar.)	(Ontario) Glenn Howard, Wayne Middaugh, Brent Laing, Craig Savill	(Newfoundland and Labrador) Brad Gushue, Brett Gallant, Adam Casey, Geoff Walker	Fort McMurray, Alberta	$100,000
2014 Syncrude National (Nov.)	(Manitoba) Mike McEwen, B. J. Neufeld, Matt Wozniak, Denni Neufeld	(Ontario) Brad Jacobs, Ryan Fry, E. J. Harnden, Ryan Harnden	Sault Ste. Marie, Ontario	$100,000
2015 National	(Newfoundland and Labrador) Brad Gushue, Mark Nichols, Brett Gallant, Geoff Walker	(Manitoba) Reid Carruthers, Braeden Moskowy, Derek Samagalski, Colin Hodgson	Oshawa, Ontario	$100,000
2016 Boost National	(Ontario) Brad Jacobs, Ryan Fry, E. J. Harnden, Ryan Harnden	(Manitoba) Reid Carruthers, Braeden Moskowy, Derek Samagalski, Colin Hodgson	Sault Ste. Marie, Ontario	$125,000
2017 Boost National	(Scotland) Bruce Mouat, Grant Hardie, Bobby Lammie, Hammy McMillan Jr.	(South Korea) Kim Chang-min, Seong Se-hyeon, Oh Eun-soo, Lee Ki-bok	Sault Ste. Marie, Ontario	$125,000
2018 Boost National	(Scotland) Ross Paterson, Kyle Waddell, Duncan Menzies, Michael Goodfellow	(Scotland) Bruce Mouat, Grant Hardie, Bobby Lammie, Hammy McMillan Jr.	Conception Bay South, Newfoundland and Labrador	$125,000
2019 Boost National	(Ontario) Brad Jacobs, Marc Kennedy, E. J. Harnden, Ryan Harnden	(Sweden) Niklas Edin, Oskar Eriksson, Rasmus Wranå, Christoffer Sundgren	Conception Bay South, Newfoundland and Labrador	$150,000
2021 Boost National	(Newfoundland and Labrador) Brad Gushue, Mark Nichols, Brett Gallant, Geoff Walker	(Scotland) Bruce Mouat, Grant Hardie, Bobby Lammie, Hammy McMillan Jr.	Chestermere, Alberta	$150,000
2022 Boost National	(Newfoundland and Labrador) Brad Gushue, Mark Nichols, E. J. Harnden, Geoff Walker	(Sweden) Niklas Edin, Oskar Eriksson, Rasmus Wranå, Christoffer Sundgren	North Bay, Ontario	$150,000
2023 KIOTI National	(Italy) Joël Retornaz, Amos Mosaner, Sebastiano Arman, Mattia Giovanella	(Sweden) Niklas Edin, Oskar Eriksson, Rasmus Wranå, Christoffer Sundgren	Westville Road, Nova Scotia	$200,000
2024 KIOTI National	(Scotland) Bruce Mouat, Grant Hardie, Bobby Lammie, Hammy McMillan Jr.	(Alberta) Brad Jacobs, Marc Kennedy, Brett Gallant, Ben Hebert	St. John's, Newfoundland and Labrador	$200,000
2025 KIOTI GSOC Tahoe	(Scotland) Bruce Mouat, Grant Hardie, Bobby Lammie, Hammy McMillan Jr.	(Manitoba) Matt Dunstone, Colton Lott, E. J. Harnden, Ryan Harnden	Stateline, Nevada	$200,000
2026 HearingLife National	(Alberta) Brad Jacobs, Marc Kennedy, Brett Gallant, Ben Hebert	(Switzerland) Benoît Schwarz-van Berkel, Yannick Schwaller (skip), Sven Michel, Pablo Lachat-Couchepin	Sydney, Nova Scotia	$200,000

*Maxime Elmaleh curled for the team in the final.

=== Women ===
Year	Winning team	Runner-up team	Location	Purse (CAD)
2015	(Ontario) Rachel Homan, Emma Miskew, Joanne Courtney, Lisa Weagle	(Ontario) Tracy Fleury, Crystal Webster, Jenna Walsh, Jenn Horgan	Oshawa, Ontario	$100,000
2016	(Manitoba) Kerri Einarson, Selena Kaatz, Liz Fyfe, Kristin MacCuish	(Switzerland) Silvana Tirinzoni, Cathy Overton-Clapham, Esther Neuenschwander, Marlene Albrecht	Sault Ste. Marie, Ontario	$100,000
2017	(Manitoba) Jennifer Jones, Kaitlyn Lawes, Jill Officer, Dawn McEwen	(Alberta) Casey Scheidegger, Cary-Anne McTaggart, Jessie Scheidegger, Kristie Moore	Sault Ste. Marie, Ontario	$125,000
2018	(Ontario) Rachel Homan, Emma Miskew, Joanne Courtney, Lisa Weagle	(Manitoba) Kerri Einarson, Val Sweeting, Shannon Birchard, Briane Meilleur	Conception Bay South, Newfoundland and Labrador	$100,000
2019	(Sweden) Anna Hasselborg, Sara McManus, Agnes Knochenhauer, Sofia Mabergs	(Manitoba) Jennifer Jones, Kaitlyn Lawes, Jocelyn Peterman, Laura Walker	Conception Bay South, Newfoundland and Labrador	$150,000
2021	(Sweden) Anna Hasselborg, Sara McManus, Agnes Knochenhauer, Sofia Mabergs	(Manitoba) Tracy Fleury, Selena Njegovan, Liz Fyfe, Kristin MacCuish	Chestermere, Alberta	$150,000
2022	(Switzerland) Alina Pätz, Silvana Tirinzoni (skip), Carole Howald, Briar Schwaller-Hürlimann	(Manitoba) Kerri Einarson, Val Sweeting, Shannon Birchard, Briane Harris	North Bay, Ontario	$150,000
2023	(South Korea) Gim Eun-ji, Kim Min-ji, Kim Su-ji, Seol Ye-eun, Seol Ye-ji	(Ontario) Rachel Homan, Tracy Fleury, Emma Miskew, Sarah Wilkes	Westville Road, Nova Scotia	$200,000
2024	(Ontario) Rachel Homan, Tracy Fleury, Emma Miskew, Sarah Wilkes	(Sweden) Anna Hasselborg, Sara McManus, Agnes Knochenhauer, Sofia Mabergs	St. John's, Newfoundland and Labrador	$200,000
2025	(Ontario) Rachel Homan, Tracy Fleury, Emma Miskew, Sarah Wilkes	(Switzerland) Alina Pätz, Silvana Tirinzoni (skip), Carole Howald, Selina Witschonke	Stateline, Nevada	$200,000
2026	(Switzerland) Alina Pätz, Selina Witschonke, Stefanie Berset, Renée Frigo	(Japan) Miku Nihira, Momoha Tabata, Sae Yamamoto, Mikoto Nakajima	Sydney, Nova Scotia	$200,000
