= Pat Simmons (curler) =

Canadian curler

- Curler
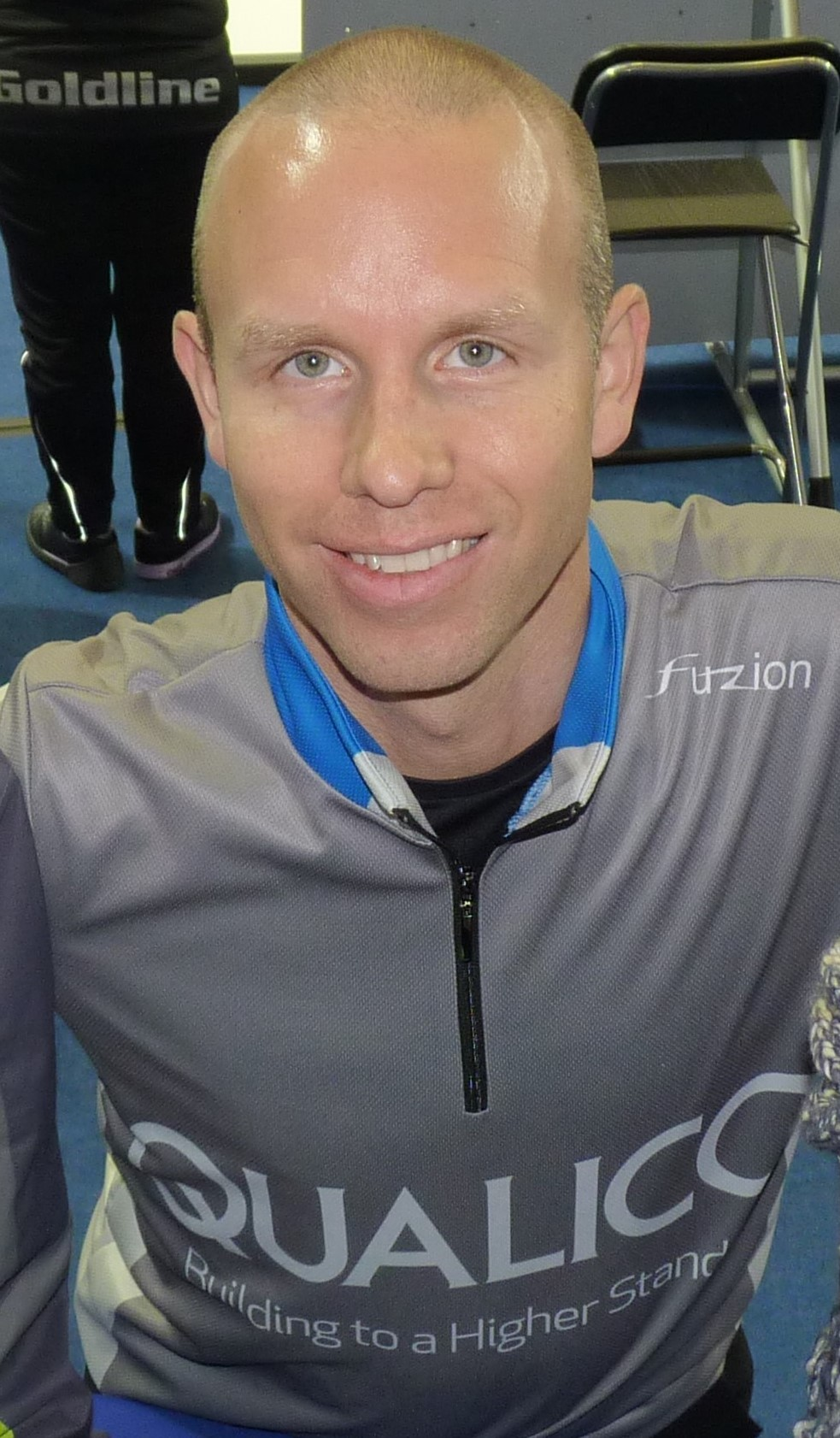
- Simmons at the 2015 Masters
- Born: November 21, 1974 (age 51); Moose Jaw, Saskatchewan, Canada

Team
- Curling club: Moose Jaw Ford CC; Moose Jaw, SK

Curling career
- Member Association: Saskatchewan (2003–2011); Alberta (2012–2017); Manitoba (2017–18; 2021–present)
- Brier: 11 (2005, 2006, 2007, 2008, 2011, 2012, 2014, 2015, 2016, 2022, 2024)
- World Championship: 2 (2014, 2015)
- Top CTRS ranking: 2nd (2013–14)
- Grand Slam victories: 2 (2012 Masters, 2013 Canadian Open)
Medal record
Men's curling
Representing Canada
World Championships
Bronze medal – third place	2015 Halifax
The Brier
Gold medal – first place	2015 Calgary
Representing Alberta
The Brier
Gold medal – first place	2014 Kamloops
Silver medal – second place	2012 Saskatoon
Representing Saskatchewan
The Brier
Silver medal – second place	2024 Regina
Bronze medal – third place	2008 Winnipeg

Patrick "Simms" Simmons (born November 21, 1974, in Moose Jaw, Saskatchewan) is a Canadian curler. Simmons played on the 2014 and 2015 Canadian champion rink, the latter year as skip. As a skip, he has also represented Saskatchewan in four straight Briers from 2005 to 2008 and again in 2011. He has also represented Alberta twice at the Brier.

He currently coaches the Mike McEwen rink.

== Career ==
Simmons made it to his first Brier in 2005 after winning his first provincial championship, defeating Daryl Williamson in that year's Saskatchewan final with teammates Jeff Sharp, Chris Haichert and Ben Hebert. At the Brier, he skipped Saskatchewan to a 6–5 finish, in a four-way tie for fifth place, out of the playoffs.

Simmons was the Saskatchewan provincial championship for the second time in a row in 2006, defeating Bruce Korte in the final. At the 2006 Tim Hortons Brier, Simmons skipped Saskatchewan to a 5–6 finish at the Brier, tied for eighth place and out of the playoffs.

Simmons won his third straight provincial title in 2007, defeating Eugene Hritzuk in the provincial final with new teammates Gerry Adam and Steve Laycock playing front end. Simmons had a much better record at the 2007 Tim Hortons Brier, finishing 7–4, but narrowly missed the playoffs once again, finishing in fifth place.

Simmons won his fourth straight provincial title in 2008, defeating Darrell McKee in the Saskatchewan final. At the 2008 Tim Hortons Brier, Simmons finally skipped Saskatchewan to a playoff spot at the Brier, finishing the round robin in second place with a 9–2 record. However, he lost in the semifinal in an extra end to Ontario, skipped by Glenn Howard.

Simmons' rink qualified for the 2009 Canadian Olympic Curling Trials, but finished the round robin with a 2–5 record, in seventh place.

Simmons would return to the Brier in 2011, throwing fourth stones for Steve Laycock. The team finished with a 4–7 record.

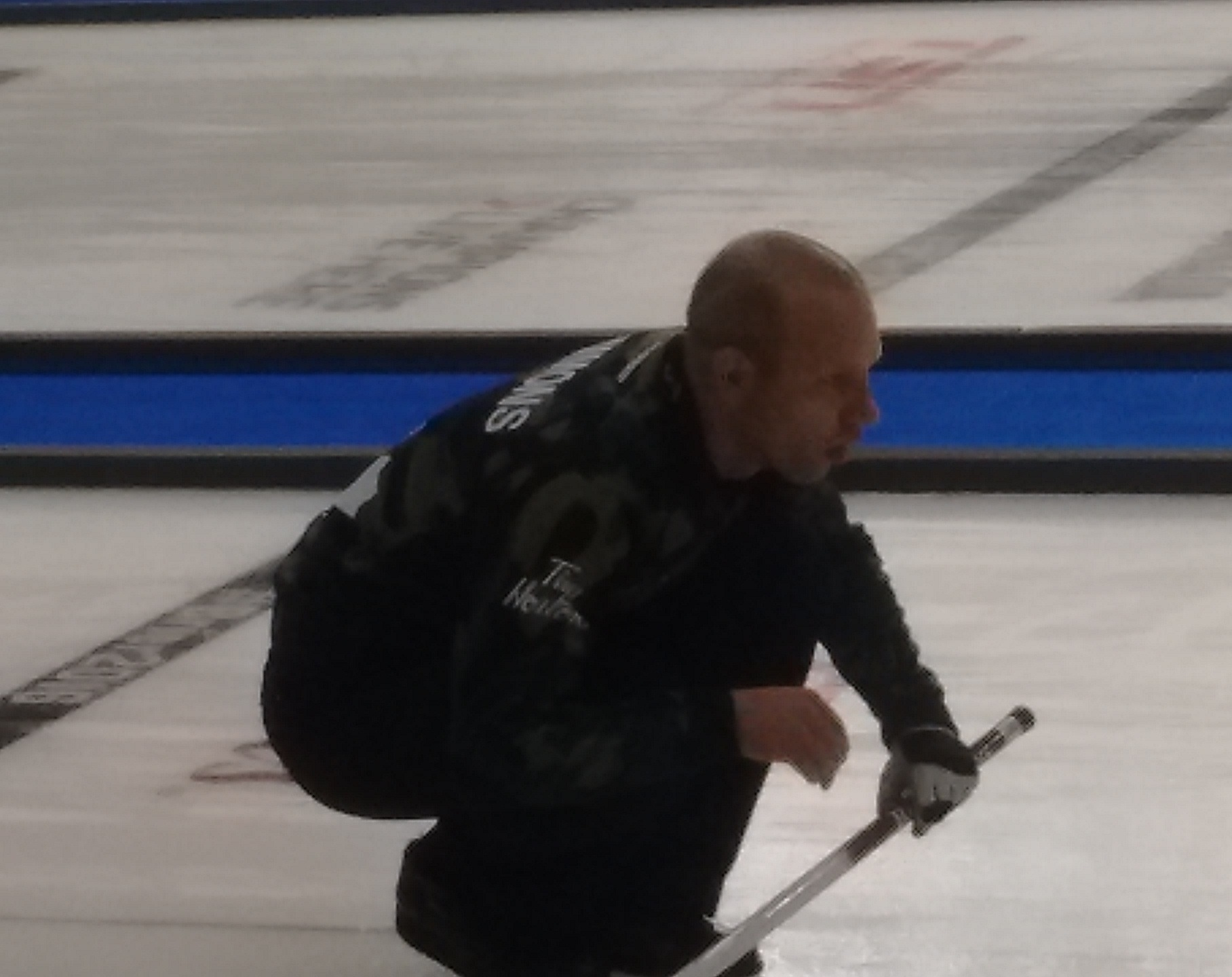
Simmons at the 2016 Tim Hortons Brier.

The next season, Simmons joined the Kevin Koe rink out of Calgary, Alberta replacing Blake MacDonald. The team represented Alberta in the 2012 Brier, where they finished second. They played in the 2013 Canadian Olympic Curling Trials, going 2–5. The team made won another provincial championship in 2014. At the 2014 Brier the Koe rink defeated John Morris' B.C. rink 10–5 in the final, giving Simmons his first Brier title. The team finished fourth at the 2014 World Men's Curling Championship. It was the first time Simmons represented Canada internationally.

Koe left the team in 2014; the rest of the rink decided to stick together to compete as Team Canada at the 2015 Tim Hortons Brier, drafting John Morris to replace Koe as skip.

During the 2015 Brier after Morris's Team Canada started off 2–3 Morris approached Simmons with an idea that Simmons skip and Morris move to vice. The move paid off as the rink went on to win the competition. They won the bronze medal at the 2015 World Championships in Halifax.

== Personal life ==
Simmons is a chiropractor by trade, but currently works as the Director of High Performance for Curlsask. He is formerly married to Cindy Simmons, and has two children. He resides in Moose Jaw.

== Teams ==
Season	Skip	Third	Second	Lead
1991–92	Scott Bitz	Jeff Tait	Pat Simmons	Greg Burrows
1993–94	Neil Cursons	Pat Simmons	Rob Nixon	Jamie Burrows
1994–95	Neil Cursons	Pat Simmons	Rob Nixon	Jamie Burrows
1999–00	Pat Simmons	Scott Bitz	Brian McCusker	Ron Pugsley
2000–01	Rod Montgomery	Pat Simmons	Joel Jordison	Scott McGrath
2001–02	Rod Montgomery	Pat Simmons	Joel Jordison	Brock Montgomery
2002–03	Pat Simmons	Joel Jordison	Ryan Miller	Neil Cursons
2003–04	Pat Simmons	Jeff Sharp	Chris Haichert	Ben Hebert
2004–05	Pat Simmons	Jeff Sharp	Chris Haichert	Ben Hebert
2005–06	Pat Simmons	Jeff Sharp	Chris Haichert	Ben Hebert
2006–07	Pat Simmons	Jeff Sharp	Gerry Adam	Steve Laycock
2007–08	Pat Simmons	Jeff Sharp	Gerry Adam	Steve Laycock
2008–09	Pat Simmons	Jeff Sharp	Gerry Adam	Steve Laycock
2009–10	Pat Simmons	Gerry Adam	Jeff Sharp	Steve Laycock
2010–11	Pat Simmons	Steve Laycock	Brennen Jones	Dallan Muyres
2011–12	Kevin Koe	Pat Simmons	Carter Rycroft	Nolan Thiessen
2012–13	Kevin Koe	Pat Simmons	Carter Rycroft	Nolan Thiessen
2013–14	Kevin Koe	Pat Simmons	Carter Rycroft	Nolan Thiessen
2014–15	John Morris; Pat Simmons	Pat Simmons; John Morris	Carter Rycroft; Scott Bailey	Nolan Thiessen
2015–16	Pat Simmons	John Morris	Carter Rycroft	Nolan Thiessen
2016–17	Brendan Bottcher	Pat Simmons	Bradley Thiessen	Karrick Martin
2017–18	Pat Simmons	Colton Lott	Kyle Doering	Rob Gordon
2021–22 (Sept.–Nov.)	Pat Simmons	Colton Lott	Kyle Doering	Tanner Lott

== Grand Slam record ==
Key
C	Champion
F	Lost in Final
SF	Lost in Semifinal
QF	Lost in Quarterfinals
R16	Lost in the round of 16
Q	Did not advance to playoffs
T2	Played in Tier 2 event
DNP	Did not participate in event
N/A	Not a Grand Slam event that season

Event	2003–04	2004–05	2005–06	2006–07	2007–08	2008–09	2009–10	2010–11	2011–12	2012–13	2013–14	2014–15	2015–16	2016–17	2017–18
Tour Challenge	N/A	N/A	N/A	N/A	N/A	N/A	N/A	N/A	N/A	N/A	N/A	N/A	DNP	Q	QF
Masters	DNP	F	Q	QF	QF	Q	DNP	Q	QF	C	QF	Q	Q	Q	Q
The National	DNP	DNP	F	Q	QF	Q	Q	Q	QF	SF	QF	QF	QF	Q	Q
Canadian Open	DNP	DNP	DNP	QF	Q	Q	Q	QF	Q	SF	C	Q	Q	DNP	DNP
Players'	QF	Q	SF	SF	SF	Q	QF	Q	Q	Q	QF	DNP	DNP	DNP	DNP
Champions Cup	N/A	N/A	N/A	N/A	N/A	N/A	N/A	N/A	N/A	N/A	N/A	N/A	QF	DNP	DNP
