= 2007 The National (December) =

Grand Slam of Curling event

The National 2007
- Host city: Port Hawkesbury, Nova Scotia
- Dates: December 20–23, 2007
- Winner: (Alberta) Team Martin
- Skip: Kevin Martin
- Third: John Morris
- Second: Brent Laing
- Lead: Ben Hebert
- Finalist: (Alberta) Team Koe

The 2007–08 The National was held December 20-23, 2007 at Port Hawkesbury, Nova Scotia. The total purse of the event was $100,000.

Kevin Martin defeated Kevin Koe in an all-Edmonton final, claiming a total of $25,000 for his team. It would be Martin's third victory in this Grand Slam event.

== Teams ==
Skip	Third	Second	Lead	Locale
Shawn Adams	Paul Flemming	Craig Burgess	Kelly Mittelstadt	Halifax, Nova Scotia
Tom Brewster	Hammy McMillan	Ron Brewster	Colin Campbell	Aberdeen, Scotland
Kerry Burtnyk	Dan Kammerlock	Richard Daneault	Garth Smith	Winnipeg, Manitoba
Reid Carruthers	Jason Gunnlaugson	Justin Richter	Tyler Forrest	Beausejour, Manitoba
John Epping (Note: Skipping in place of Peter Corner.)	John Base	Phil Loevenmark	Pierre Charette	Brampton, Ontario
Pete Fenson	Shawn Rojeski	Joe Polo	Tom O'Connor	(United States) Bemidji, Minnesota
Brad Gushue	Mark Nichols	Chris Schille	David Noftall	St. John's, Newfoundland and Labrador
Russ Howard	Steven Howard	Terry Odishaw	Grant Odishaw	Moncton, New Brunswick
Joel Jordison	Scott Bitz	Derek Owens	Dean Hicke	Moose Jaw, Saskatchewan
Mark Kehoe	Kevin Saccary	Scott Saccary	Donnie Smith	Falmouth, Nova Scotia
Ted Appelman	Jamie King (skip)	Tom Appelman	Todd Brick	Edmonton, Alberta
Blake MacDonald	Kevin Koe (skip)	Carter Rycroft	Nolan Thiessen	Edmonton, Alberta
Charley Thomas	Brent MacDonald (skip)	Warren Hassall	Brendan Melnyk	Edmonton, Alberta
Kevin Martin	John Morris	Brent Laing	Ben Hebert	Edmonton, Alberta
Greg McAulay	Ken Maskiewich	Bill Fisher	Aaron Watson	Richmond, British Columbia
Wayne Middaugh	Jon Mead	Scott Bailey	Craig Savill	Toronto, Ontario
Pat Simmons	Jeff Sharp	Gerry Adam	Steve Laycock	Davidson, Saskatchewan
Jeff Stoughton	Ryan Fry	Rob Fowler	Steve Gould	Winnipeg, Manitoba

== Draw ==
=== Group A ===
Skip	W	L
(Alberta) Kevin Martin	4	1
(Saskatchewan) Pat Simmons	4	1
(British Columbia) Greg McAulay	3	2
(Nova Scotia) Shawn Adams	2	3
(Saskatchewan) Joel Jordison	1	4
(Nova Scotia) Mark Kehoe	1	4

=== Group B ===
Skip	W	L
(Alberta) Kevin Koe	5	0
(Ontario) Wayne Middaugh	4	1
(Manitoba) Kerry Burtnyk	3	2
(Manitoba) Reid Carruthers	2	3
(Alberta) Jamie King	1	4
(United States) Pete Fenson	0	5

=== Group C ===
Skip	W	L
(Ontario) Team Corner	4	1
(Manitoba) Jeff Stoughton	4	1
(Newfoundland and Labrador) Brad Gushue	2	3
(Scotland) Tom Brewster	2	3
(Alberta) Brent MacDonald	2	3
(New Brunswick) Russ Howard	1	4

== Playoffs ==
Quarter-Finals
(Alberta)	Koe	6
(Manitoba)	Burtnyk	4
(Ontario)	Corner	5
(Ontario)	Middaugh	6
(Saskatchewan)	Simmons	4
(Manitoba)	Stoughton	9
(Alberta)	Martin	6
(British Columbia)	McAulay	5

Semi-Finals
(Alberta)	Koe	6
(Ontario)	Middaugh	5
(Manitoba)	Stoughton	5
(Alberta)	Martin	6

Final
(Alberta)	Koe	2
(Alberta)	Martin	5
