= 2007 The National (March) =

Grand Slam of Curling event

The National 2007
- Host city: Port Hawkesbury, Nova Scotia
- Arena: Port Hawkesbury Civic Centre
- Dates: March 22–25, 2007
- Winner: (Alberta) Team Martin
- Skip: Kevin Martin
- Third: John Morris
- Second: Marc Kennedy
- Lead: Ben Hebert
- Finalist: (Alberta) Team Koe

2007 The National was held March 22–25, 2007, at Port Hawkesbury, Nova Scotia. The total purse of the event was $100,000.

Kevin Martin defeated Kevin Koe in an all-Edmonton final. It was Martin's second victory in this Grand Slam event, the first with his new team.

== Teams ==
Skip	Third	Second	Lead	Locale
Shawn Adams	Paul Flemming	Craig Burgess	Kelly Mittelstadt	Halifax, Nova Scotia
John Base	Phil Loevenmark	John Epping	Paul Moffatt	Oakville, Ontario
Todd Birr	Bill Todhunter	Greg Johnson	Kevin Birr	(United States) Mankato, Minnesota
Tom Brewster	Hammy McMillan	Ron Brewster	Colin Campbell	Aberdeen, Scotland
Kerry Burtnyk	Dan Kammerlock	Richard Daneault	Cory Naharnie	Winnipeg, Manitoba
Martin Ferland	Pierre Charette (skip)	Philippe Lemay	Marco Berthelot	Trois-Rivières, Quebec
Robert Desjardins	Jean-Sébastien Roy	Jean-François Charest	Maurice Cayouette	Chicoutimi, Quebec
Pete Fenson	Shawn Rojeski	Joe Polo	Doug Pottinger	(United States) Bemidji, Minnesota
David Nedohin	Randy Ferbey (skip)	Scott Pfeifer	Marcel Rocque	Edmonton, Alberta
Brad Gushue	Mark Nichols	Chris Schille	Jamie Korab	St. John's, Newfoundland and Labrador
Glenn Howard	Richard Hart	Brent Laing	Craig Savill	Coldwater, Ontario
Mark Johnson	Blayne Iskiw	Glen Kennedy	Adam Enright	Edmonton, Alberta
Blake MacDonald	Kevin Koe (skip)	Carter Rycroft	Nolan Thiessen	Edmonton, Alberta
Kevin Martin	John Morris	Marc Kennedy	Ben Hebert	Edmonton, Alberta
Brent Pierce (Note: Skipping in place of Don Walchuk.)	Brent MacDonald	Warren Hassall	Brendan Melnyk	Edmonton, Alberta
Andreas Schwaller	Jan Hauser	Markus Eggler	Simon Strübin	Baden, Switzerland
Pat Simmons	Jeff Sharp	Chris Haichert	Steve Laycock	Davidson, Saskatchewan
Thomas Ulsrud	Torger Nergård	Thomas Due	Jan Thoresen	Oslo, Norway

== Draw ==
Group A	W	L
(Alberta) Kevin Martin	5	0
(Newfoundland and Labrador) Brad Gushue	4	1
(Nova Scotia) Shawn Adams	3	2
(Manitoba) Kerry Burtnyk	2	3
(United States) Todd Birr	1	4
(United States) Pete Fenson	0	5

Group B	W	L
(Alberta) Team Walchuk	4	1
(Ontario) Glenn Howard	4	1
(Scotland) Tom Brewster, Jr.	3	2
(Quebec) Pierre Charette	2	3
(Switzerland) Andreas Schwaller	1	4
(Saskatchewan) Pat Simmons	1	4

Group C	W	L
(Alberta) Randy Ferbey	4	1
(Norway) Thomas Ulsrud	3	2
(Alberta) Kevin Koe	3	2
(Alberta) Mark Johnson	3	2
(Quebec) Robert Desjardins	1	4
(Ontario) John Base	1	4

== Tie breakers ==
- Adams 4–3 Ulsrud
- Brewster 7–2 Johnson

== Playoffs ==
Quarter-Finals
(Alberta)	Martin	6
(Nova Scotia)	Adams	2
(Ontario)	Howard	2
(Alberta)	Walchuk	5
(Alberta)	Ferbey	6
(Scotland)	Brewster	2
(Newfoundland and Labrador)	Gushue	6
(Alberta)	Koe	7

Semi-Finals
(Alberta)	Martin	5
(Alberta)	Walchuk	3
(Alberta)	Ferbey	3
(Alberta)	Koe	7

Final
(Alberta)	Martin	6
(Alberta)	Koe	5
