= 2017 belairdirect BC Men's Curling Championship =

- Host city: Abbotsford, British Columbia
- Arena: Abbotsford Curling Club
- Dates: February 8–12
- Winner: John Morris
- Curling club: Vernon Curling Club, Vernon; Kelowna Curling Club, Kelowna
- Skip: John Morris
- Fourth: Jim Cotter
- Second: Tyrel Griffith
- Lead: Rick Sawatsky
- Finalist: Dean Joanisse

The 2017 belairdirect BC Men's Curling Championship was held from February 8 to 12 at the Abbotsford Curling Club in Abbotsford, British Columbia.

== Qualification process ==
Sixteen teams qualified for the provincial tournament through several methods. The qualification process is as follows:

Qualification method	Berths	Qualifying team
Defending champion from previous year	1	John Morris
CTRS points leaders (December 1, 2015 – December 1, 2016)	2	Dean Joanisse; Sean Geall
Island Playdown qualifier (Dec. 11–13)	2	Wes Craig; Glen Jackson
Lower Mainland Playdown qualifier (Dec. 11–13)	4	Tyler Tardi; Andrew Bilesky; Jeff Guignard; Mike Moss
Okanagan Playdown qualifier (Dec. 12–13)	1	Mark Longworth
Kootenay Playdown qualifier (Dec. 12–13)	1	Tom Buchy
Open Qualification Round (Jan. 8–10)	1	Ken McArdle

== Teams ==
The teams are listed as follows:

Skip	Third	Second	Lead	Alternate	Locale(s)
Andrew Bilesky	Steve Kopf	Daniel Wenzek	Cameron Watt	Derek Erington	Royal City Curling Club, New Westminster
Tom Buchy	Dean Horning	Dave Toffolo	Darren Will		Kimberley Curling Club, Kimberley
Wes Craig	Miles Craig	Cameron de Jong	Dave McGarry		Victoria Curling Club, Victoria
Sean Geall	Jeff Richard	Brendan Willis	David Harper	Grant Olson	Kelowna Curling Club, Kelowna
Jeff Guignard	Chris Faa	Jeff Sargent	Nick Kuit		Vancouver Curling Club, Vancouver
Glen Jackson	Andrew Komlodi	Corey Chester	Joel Cave		Victoria Curling Club, Victoria
Dean Joanisse	Paul Cseke	Jay Wakefield	John Cullen	Steve Petryk	Golden Ears Curling Club, Maple Ridge
Mark Longworth	Michael Longworth	Aron Herrick	John Slattery		Vernon Curling Club, Vernon
Ken McArdle	Denis Sutton	Darren Boden	Glen Allen	Neil Dangerfield	Royal City Curling Club, New Westminster; Victoria Curling Club, Victoria
John Morris	Jim Cotter	Tyrel Griffith	Rick Sawatsky		Vernon Curling Club, Vernon; Kelowna Curling Club, Kelowna
Richard Brower	Jan Bos	Mike Moss (skip)	Deryk Brower		Richmond Curling Club, Richmond
Tyler Tardi	Sterling Middleton	Jordan Tardi	Nicholas Meister		Langley Curling Club, Langley; Royal City Curling Club, New Westminster

== Knockout Draw Brackets ==
The draw is listed as follows:

=== A Event ===
First Knockout
Tom Buchy	8
Jeff Guignard	2
Andrew Bilesky	7
Mike Moss	6
Glen Jackson	4
Mark Longworth	1
Ken McArdle	9
Wes Craig	6

Quarterfinals
John Morris	9
Tom Buchy	2
Andrew Bilesky	6
Tyler Tardi	4
Sean Geall	7
Glen Jackson	6
Ken McArdle	7
Dean Joanisse	2

Semifinals
John Morris	8
Andrew Bilesky	6
Sean Geall	8
Ken McArdle	7

Qualifier 1
John Morris	9
Sean Geall	0

=== B Event ===
Second Knockout
Jeff Guignard	8
Tyler Tardi	9
Glen Jackson	5
Mike Moss	4
Mark Longworth	1
Dean Joanisse	12
Wes Craig	9
Tom Buchy	10

Quarterfinals
Tyler Tardi	10
Ken McArdle	9
Glen Jackson	8
Andrew Bilesky	5
Dean Joanisse	8
Tom Buchy	3

Semifinals
Tyler Tardi	10
Glen Jackson	4
Dean Joanisse	6
Sean Geall	4

Qualifier 2
Tyler Tardi	4
Dean Joanisse	5

=== C Event ===
C1 knockout		Semifinals		Finals
		Sean Geall	6
Jeff Guignard	4	Mike Moss	7
Mike Moss	6			Mike Moss	3
				Glen Jackson	7
		Tom Buchy	2
		Glen Jackson	4

C2 knockout		Semifinals		Finals
Mark Longworth	8
Wes Craig	9	Wes Craig	5
Ken McArdle	7	Ken McArdle	8
Andrew Bilesky	5			Ken McArdle	8
				Tyler Tardi	2

== Playoffs ==
Page playoff system
A	John Morris	11
B	Dean Joanisse	6
C1	Glen Jackson	6
C2	Ken McArdle	3

Semifinal
B	Dean Joanisse	11
C1	Glen Jackson	7

Final
A	John Morris	6
B	Dean Joanisse	3

=== A vs. B ===
Saturday, February 13, 2:00 pm

Team	1	2	3	4	5	6	7	8	9	10	Final
John Morris	2	1	1	0	3	0	2	0	2	X	11
Dean Joanisse	0	0	0	2	0	2	0	2	0	X	6

=== C1 vs. C2 ===
Saturday, February 11, 7:00 pm

Team	1	2	3	4	5	6	7	8	9	10	Final
Glen Jackson	0	0	1	1	0	0	1	2	1	X	6
Ken McArdle	0	1	0	0	2	0	0	0	0	X	3

=== Semifinal ===
Sunday, February 14, 11:00 am

Team	1	2	3	4	5	6	7	8	9	10	11	Final
Dean Joanisse	0	1	0	1	0	2	0	2	0	1	4	11
Glen Jackson	0	0	1	0	3	0	2	0	1	0	0	7

=== Final ===
Sunday, February 14, 4:00 pm

Team	1	2	3	4	5	6	7	8	9	10	Final
John Morris	0	1	1	0	1	2	1	0	0	X	6
Dean Joanisse	0	0	0	2	0	0	0	1	0	X	3

2017 BelairDirect BC Men's Championship

John Morris
2nd British Columbia Provincial Championship title
