= 2007 Players' Championship =

Grand Slam of Curling event

The 2007 Tylenol Players' Championships was held at the Stampede Corral in Calgary, Alberta. April 10-15, 2007. It was the last event of the 2006-07 curling season

Rankings are the CCA rankings.

== Men's ==
=== A event ===
Quarterfinals
1	(Alberta) Kevin Martin	6
17	(Saskatchewan) Bruce Korte	3
6	(Alberta) Kevin Koe	5
10	(Ontario) Wayne Middaugh	6
5	(Newfoundland and Labrador) Brad Gushue	8
14	(Ontario) John Base	4
8	(Saskatchewan) Pat Simmons	8
13	(Quebec) Pierre Charette	3

Semifinals
1	(Alberta) Kevin Martin	3
10	(Ontario) Wayne Middaugh	5
5	(Newfoundland and Labrador) Brad Gushue	6
8	(Saskatchewan) Pat Simmons	7

Qualifier 1
10	(Ontario) Wayne Middaugh	3
8	(Saskatchewan) Pat Simmons	6

Quarterfinals
2	(Ontario) Glenn Howard	4
16	(Alberta) Jamie King	2
4	(Manitoba) Jeff Stoughton	4
9	(Alberta) Mark Johnson	7
3	(Alberta) Randy Ferbey	6
12	(Alberta) Don Walchuk	3
7	(Manitoba) Kerry Burtnyk	4
11	(Saskatchewan) Joel Jordison	7

Semifinals
2	(Ontario) Glenn Howard	8
9	(Alberta) Mark Johnson	6
3	(Alberta) Randy Ferbey	7
11	(Saskatchewan) Joel Jordison	1

Qualifier 2
2	(Ontario) Glenn Howard	3
3	(Alberta) Randy Ferbey	5

=== B Event ===
Semifinals
17	(Saskatchewan) Bruce Korte	3
6	(Alberta) Kevin Koe	6
14	(Ontario) John Base	6
13	(Quebec) Pierre Charette	3

Finals
6	(Alberta) Kevin Koe	5
14	(Ontario) John Base	2

Qualifier 3
6	(Alberta) Kevin Koe	7
2	(Ontario) Glenn Howard	4

Semifinals
16	(Alberta) Jamie King	9
4	(Manitoba) Jeff Stoughton	2
12	(Alberta) Don Walchuk	7
7	(Manitoba) Kerry Burtnyk	6

Finals
16	(Alberta) Jamie King	6
12	(Alberta) Don Walchuk	1

Qualifier 4
16	(Alberta) Jamie King	9
10	(Ontario) Wayne Middaugh	4

Semifinals
1	(Alberta) Kevin Martin	5
5	(Newfoundland and Labrador) Brad Gushue	4
9	(Alberta) Mark Johnson	5
11	(Saskatchewan) Joel Jordison	8

Qualifier 5
1	(Alberta) Kevin Martin	6
11	(Saskatchewan) Joel Jordison	5

=== C Event ===
Semifinals			Finals
			9	(Alberta) Mark Johnson	3
17	(Saskatchewan) Bruce Korte	6	17	(Saskatchewan) Bruce Korte	5
13	(Quebec) Pierre Charette	2

Qualifier 6
17	(Saskatchewan) Bruce Korte	5
10	(Ontario) Wayne Middaugh	3

Semifinals			Finals
			5	(Newfoundland and Labrador) Brad Gushue	9
4	(Manitoba) Jeff Stoughton	0	7	(Manitoba) Kerry Burtnyk	6
7	(Manitoba) Kerry Burtnyk	8

Qualifier 7
5	(Newfoundland and Labrador) Brad Gushue	2
2	(Ontario) Glenn Howard	6

Semifinals			Qualifier 8
			11	(Saskatchewan) Joel Jordison	6
14	(Ontario) John Base	10	14	(Ontario) John Base	5
12	(Alberta) Don Walchuk	5

=== Championship ===
Quarterfinals
Q2	(Alberta) Randy Ferbey	10
Q6	(Saskatchewan) Bruce Korte	2
Q3	(Alberta) Kevin Koe	5
Q4	(Alberta) Jamie King	3
Q1	(Saskatchewan) Pat Simmons	5
Q8	(Saskatchewan) Joel Jordison	2
Q5	(Alberta) Kevin Martin	7
Q7	(Ontario) Glenn Howard	6

Semifinals
Q2	(Alberta) Randy Ferbey	4
Q3	(Alberta) Kevin Koe	7
Q1	(Saskatchewan) Pat Simmons	3
Q5	(Alberta) Kevin Martin	5

Finals
Q3	(Alberta) Kevin Koe	4
Q5	(Alberta) Kevin Martin	6

== Women's ==
=== A event ===
Quarterfinals
3	(Saskatchewan) Sherry Anderson	5
19	(Manitoba) Darcy Robertson	11
7	(Saskatchewan) Stefanie Lawton	10
10	(Alberta) Deb Santos	9
4	(Alberta) Shannon Kleibrink	8
17	(Alberta) Heather Rankin	2
6	(Alberta) Cathy King	5
12	(British Columbia) Team Law	4

Semifinals
19	(Manitoba) Darcy Robertson	3
7	(Saskatchewan) Stefanie Lawton	7
4	(Alberta) Shannon Kleibrink	2
6	(Alberta) Cathy King	5

Qualifier 1
7	(Saskatchewan) Stefanie Lawton	7
6	(Alberta) Cathy King	4

Quarterfinals
1	(Manitoba) Jennifer Jones	1
21	(Ontario) Colleen Madonia	8
8	(Alberta) Crystal Webster	4
9	(Ontario) Sherry Middaugh	9
5	(Alberta) Cheryl Bernard	11
15	(Alberta) Renelle Bryden	3
2	(British Columbia) Kelly Scott	6
13	(Manitoba) Karen Porritt	2

Semifinals
21	(Ontario) Colleen Madonia	3
9	(Ontario) Sherry Middaugh	7
5	(Alberta) Cheryl Bernard	5
2	(British Columbia) Kelly Scott	6

Qualifier 2
9	(Ontario) Sherry Middaugh	3
2	(British Columbia) Kelly Scott	4

=== B Event ===
Semifinals
3	(Saskatchewan) Sherry Anderson	6
10	(Alberta) Deb Santos	4
17	(Alberta) Heather Rankin	6
12	(British Columbia) Team Law	7

Finals
3	(Saskatchewan) Sherry Anderson	6
12	(British Columbia) Team Law	5

Qualifier 3
3	(Saskatchewan) Sherry Anderson	3
9	(Ontario) Sherry Middaugh	6

Semifinals
1	(Manitoba) Jennifer Jones	5
8	(Alberta) Crystal Webster	2
15	(Alberta) Renelle Bryden	7
13	(Manitoba) Karen Porritt	6

Finals
1	(Manitoba) Jennifer Jones	6
15	(Alberta) Renelle Bryden	2

Qualifier 4
1	(Manitoba) Jennifer Jones	8
6	(Alberta) Cathy King	2

Semifinals
19	(Manitoba) Darcy Robertson	7
4	(Alberta) Shannon Kleibrink	9
21	(Ontario) Colleen Madonia	5
5	(Alberta) Cheryl Bernard	6

Qualifier 5
4	(Alberta) Shannon Kleibrink	7
5	(Alberta) Cheryl Bernard	8

=== C Event ===
Semifinals			Finals
			21	(Ontario) Colleen Madonia	4
10	(Alberta) Deb Santos	6	10	(Alberta) Deb Santos	7
17	(Alberta) Heather Rankin	4

Qualifier 6
10	(Alberta) Deb Santos	4
6	(Alberta) Cathy King	8

Semifinals			Finals
			19	(Manitoba) Darcy Robertson	4
8	(Alberta) Crystal Webster	2	13	(Manitoba) Karen Porritt	7
13	(Manitoba) Karen Porritt	9

Qualifier 7
13	(Manitoba) Karen Porritt	4
3	(Saskatchewan) Sherry Anderson	2

Semifinals			Qualifier 8
			4	(Alberta) Shannon Kleibrink	5
12	(British Columbia) Team Law	6	12	(British Columbia) Team Law	6
15	(Alberta) Renelle Bryden	3

=== Championship ===
Quarterfinals
Q2	(British Columbia) Kelly Scott	6
Q7	(Manitoba) Karen Porritt	4
Q5	(Alberta) Cheryl Bernard	5
Q3	(Ontario) Sherry Middaugh	3
Q1	(Saskatchewan) Stefanie Lawton	5
Q8	(British Columbia) Team Law	6
Q4	(Manitoba) Jennifer Jones	7
Q6	(Alberta) Cathy King	2

Semifinals
Q2	(British Columbia) Kelly Scott	7
Q5	(Alberta) Cheryl Bernard	2
Q8	(British Columbia) Team Law	4
Q4	(Manitoba) Jennifer Jones	5

Finals
Q2	(British Columbia) Kelly Scott	6
Q4	(Manitoba) Jennifer Jones	8
