= Thomas Ulsrud =

Norwegian curler and Olympic medalist (1971–2022)

- Curler
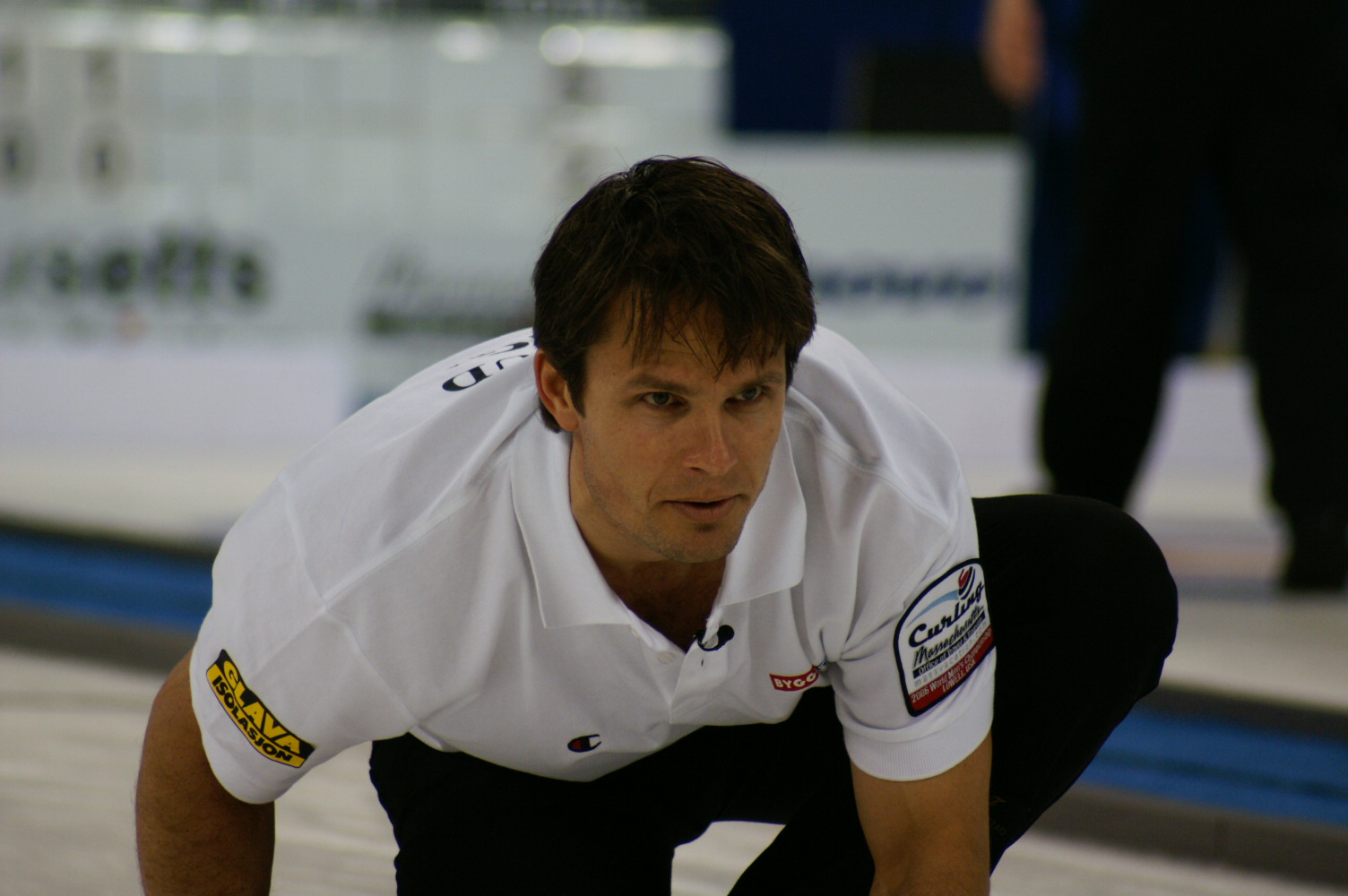
- Born: 21 October 1971; Oslo, Norway
- Died: 24 May 2022 (aged 50); Oslo, Norway

Team
- Curling club: Snarøen CC, Oslo, NOR

Curling career
- World Championship: 12 (1998, 1999, 2006, 2007, 2008, 2009, 2011, 2012, 2013, 2014, 2015, 2016)
- European Championship: 17 (1997, 2000, 2002, 2003, 2006, 2007, 2008, 2009, 2010, 2011, 2012, 2013, 2014, 2015, 2016, 2017, 2019)
- Olympic: 3 (2010, 2014, 2018)
Medal record
Curling
Representing Norway
Winter Olympics
Silver medal – second place	2010 Vancouver
World Championships
Gold medal – first place	2014 Beijing
Silver medal – second place	2015 Halifax
Bronze medal – third place	2006 Lowell
Bronze medal – third place	2008 Grand Forks
Bronze medal – third place	2009 Moncton
European Championships
Gold medal – first place	2010 Champéry
Gold medal – first place	2011 Moscow
Silver medal – second place	2007 Füssen
Silver medal – second place	2008 Örnsköldsvik
Silver medal – second place	2012 Karlstad
Silver medal – second place	2013 Stavanger
Silver medal – second place	2014 Champéry
Silver medal – second place	2016 Renfrewshire
Bronze medal – third place	2002 Grindelwald
Bronze medal – third place	2009 Aberdeen
Bronze medal – third place	2015 Esbjerg
World Junior Championships
Bronze medal – third place	1988 Füssen

Thomas Ulsrud (21 October 1971 – 24 May 2022) was a Norwegian curler from Oslo. He won a silver medal at the 2010 Winter Olympics, one World Curling Championship, two European Curling Championships, and fourteen Norwegian titles (Norwegian Men's Curling Championship and Oslo Cup). He was also known for being the skip of the team that competed while wearing colourful harlequin trousers at the Vancouver 2010 Winter Olympics. Team Ulsrud's combined showmanship and sportsmanship became iconic and contributed to reviving worldwide interest in curling since then. In 2024, he was posthumously inducted into the World Curling Hall of Fame.

== Career ==
=== Early career ===
Ulsrud began competing from 1983. In his second World Junior Curling Championship in 1988, Ulsrud skipped Norway to a bronze medal.

In 1997, he skipped in his first European Curling Championships, finishing in seventh place. Team Ulsrud competed again in 2000–2003, 2006–2009, winning bronze in 2002, silver in 2007, and bronze in 2009.

In his first World Curling Championship in 1998, Ulsrud skipped Norway to fifth place. After serving as the alternate for Pål Trulsen's team in 1999, he returned again as skip in 2006–2009, making the playoffs for the first time in 2006 and then defeated USA's Team Pete Fenson to win the bronze medal. Two more bronze medals followed in 2008 and 2009.

Between 2007 and 2010, Team Ulsrud won six World Curling Tour events, namely, the 2007 and 2009 Lucerne Curling Trophies, 2008 Baden Masters, 2008 Radisson SAS Oslo Cup, 2009 Swiss Cup Basel, and 2009 Bern Open.

=== 2010–2015 ===
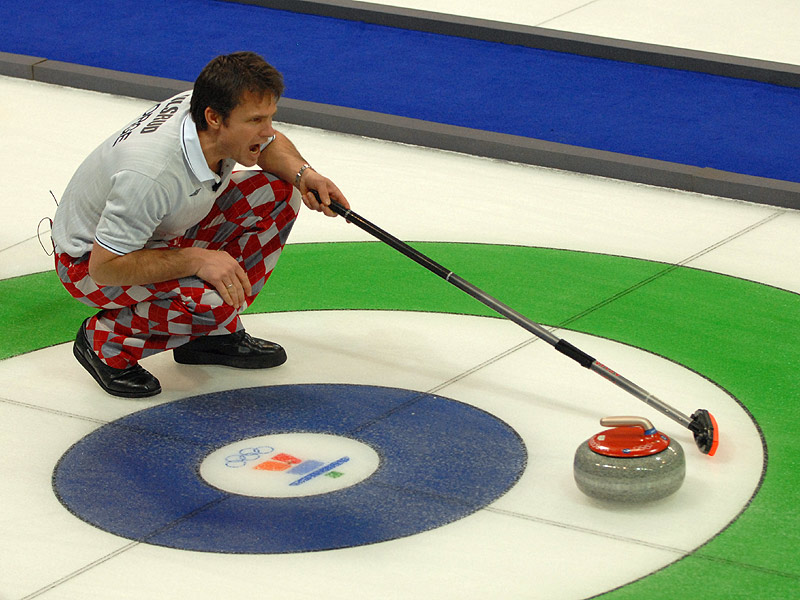
Ulsrud calling line at the 2010 Winter Olympics

At the 2010 Vancouver Winter Olympics, Team Ulsrud attracted worldwide attention, not only for introducing Loudmouth Golf's colourful harlequin pants to the arena, but also for winning the silver medal after the final game against Canada's Team Kevin Martin.

Immediately at the start of the 2010 World Curling Championship in Cortina d'Ampezzo, Italy, Ulsrud had to return home for family reasons. With Torger Nergård acting as skip, Ulsrud's teammates took first place at the end of round-robin games (10–1 score) and won the silver medal.

Team Ulsrud began the 2010-11 curling season by winning their first European Curling Championship gold medal in Champéry, Switzerland. The team topped the season off by finishing fourth at the 2011 Ford World Men's Curling Championship.

The rink won a second straight European Championships by winning the gold medal at the 2011 European Curling Championships. Later that season they would once again finish 4th at the 2012 World Men's Curling Championship. That season, the team won one WCT event, the 2012 European Masters.

The Ulsrud rink would continue their domination at the European championship by winning the silver medal at both the 2012 and 2013 events. They were less successful at the 2013 Ford World Men's Curling Championship, finishing in 5th place. The rink represented Norway once again at the 2014 Winter Olympics, where they finished 5th, with a 5-5 record. They lost in a tie-breaker match to Great Britain, skipped by David Murdoch. On the World Curling Tour, the team won one event in 2013-14, the 2013 Swiss Cup Basel. The team capped off their season by winning a gold medal at the 2014 World Men's Curling Championship.

The World champion Ulsrud rink began the 2014–15 curling season by winning the first WCT event of the year, the 2014 Baden Masters. That season, he won another silver medal at the 2014 European Curling Championships and won a silver medal at the 2015 World Men's Curling Championship, losing to Sweden's Niklas Edin rink in the final. The next season, Ulsrud led his team to a silver medal at the 2015 European Curling Championships and a disappointing sixth place finish at the 2016 World Men's Curling Championship.

=== 2016–2020 ===
In 2016, Ulsrud won another silver medal at the European Curling Championships, which he followed up by winning the Qinghai China Men's International on the tour the next month. Later in the season, he lost in a best-of-five challenge against Steffen Walstad which would have qualified his team for the 2017 World Championships. Team Ulsrud did get to represent Norway one last time at the 2017 European Curling Championships, where they finished in fourth place.

In 2018, Ulsrud and his team represented Norway at the PyeongChang Winter Olympics, placing sixth. They began the 2018–19 curling season by winning the Baden Masters for the third time in their career. Ulsrud paired up with Kristin Skaslien at the third leg of the 2018–19 Curling World Cup in the mixed doubles event. The pair made it to the final, losing to Canada's Kadriana Sahaidak and Colton Lott. It was Ulsrud's first experience in mixed doubles.

In 2019, after a light curling season where they did not play in any Grand Slam events, Team Ulsrud announced that they would be disbanding at the end of the season. In their farewell message, they humorously thanked "Team Niklas Edin, Team David Murdoch, Team Kevin Martin, Team Kevin Koe and Team Sven Michel for turning those nine potential golds into beautiful silver medals". Afterwards, Ulsrud formed a new team with Steffen Walstad, Markus Høiberg and Magnus Vågberg, and they represented Norway at the 2019 European Curling Championships, holding a 5–4 record and missing the playoffs. It was Ulsrud's final European Championship appearance. Later in the season, the team finished second at the Norwegian Men's Curling Championship, which was Ulsrud's fifth straight second place finish.

His team were set to represent Norway at the 2020 World Men's Curling Championship but it was cancelled due to the COVID-19 pandemic. Torger Nergård rejoined with Ulsrud as third, replacing Walstad, and the team played in only three domestic events because of continuing COVID-19 restrictions. It would be Ulsrud's final season, as he was diagnosed with cancer in December 2020.

== Personal life ==
Ulsrud became interested in curling at age 10 when his stepfather introduced him to the sport. When not being an athlete, Ulsrud was self-employed. He was married to Elin Grødal, and they had one son, Jesper.

Ulsrud died on 24 May 2022 from cancer, aged 50. A memorial service was held on 3 June 2022 at Ullern Church, Oslo. His former teammates remembered him for his friendship and his "inclusiveness" during their years of travelling and competing together. Tributes also came from the World Curling Federation, notably, President and Scottish curler, Kate Caithness, who praised Ulsrud and Team Norway for raising the status and popularity of curling, "They were huge ambassadors for the sport".

== Teams ==
Season	Skip	Third	Second	Lead	Alternate	Events
1984–85	Bjørn Ulshagen	Bjarte Nilsen	Terje Strand	Thomas Ulsrud		1985 WJCC
1987–88	Thomas Ulsrud	Thomas Due	Krister Aanesen	Mads Rygg		1988 WJCC
1988–89	Thomas Ulsrud	Bent Ånund Ramsfjell	Krister Aanesen	Mads Rygg		1989 WJCC
1991–92	Thomas Due	Torger Nergård	Mads Rygg	Johan Høstmælingen	Thomas Ulsrud	1992 WJCC
1997–98	Thomas Ulsrud	Johan Høstmælingen	Thomas Due	Torger Nergård	Rolf Andreas Lauten	1997 ECC
2000–01	Thomas Ulsrud	Torger Nergård	Thomas Due	Johan Høstmælingen	Flemming Davanger	2000 ECC
2002–03	Thomas Ulsrud	Torger Nergård	Thomas Due	Johan Høstmælingen	Thomas Løvold	2002 ECC
2003–04	Thomas Ulsrud	Torger Nergård	Thomas Due	Jan Thoresen	Thomas Løvold	2003 ECC
2005–06	Thomas Ulsrud	Torger Nergård	Thomas Due	Jan Thoresen	Christoffer Svae	2006 WCC
2006–07	Thomas Ulsrud	Torger Nergård	Thomas Due	Jan Thoresen	Christoffer Svae; Petter Moe; Thomas Løvold	2006 ECC, 2007 WCC
2007–08	Thomas Ulsrud	Torger Nergård	Christoffer Svae	Håvard Vad Petersson	Thomas Due	2007 ECC, 2008 WCC
2008–09	Thomas Ulsrud	Torger Nergård	Christoffer Svae	Håvard Vad Petersson	Thomas Due; Thomas Løvold	2008 ECC, 2009 WCC
2009–10	Thomas Ulsrud	Torger Nergård	Christoffer Svae	Håvard Vad Petersson	Thomas Løvold	2009 ECC, 2010 OG
2010–11	Thomas Ulsrud	Torger Nergård	Christoffer Svae	Håvard Vad Petersson	Markus Høiberg	2010 ECC, 2011 WCC
2011–12	Thomas Ulsrud	Torger Nergård	Christoffer Svae	Håvard Vad Petersson	Markus Høiberg	2011 ECC, 2012 WCC
2012–13	Thomas Ulsrud	Torger Nergård	Christoffer Svae	Håvard Vad Petersson	Thomas Løvold; Markus Høiberg	2012 ECC, 2013 WCC
2013–14	Thomas Ulsrud	Torger Nergård	Christoffer Svae	Håvard Vad Petersson	Markus Høiberg	2013 ECC, 2014 OG, 2014 WCC
2014–15	Thomas Ulsrud	Torger Nergård	Christoffer Svae	Håvard Vad Petersson	Sander Rølvåg; Markus Høiberg	2014 ECC, 2015 WCC
2015–16	Thomas Ulsrud	Torger Nergård	Christoffer Svae	Håvard Vad Petersson	Sander Rølvåg; Markus Høiberg	2015 ECC, 2016 WCC
2016–17	Thomas Ulsrud	Torger Nergård	Christoffer Svae	Håvard Vad Petersson	Sander Rølvåg	2016 ECC
2017–18	Thomas Ulsrud	Torger Nergård	Christoffer Svae	Håvard Vad Petersson	Sander Rølvåg; Markus Høiberg	2017 ECC, 2018 OG
2018–19	Thomas Ulsrud	Torger Nergård	Christoffer Svae	Håvard Vad Petersson		
2019–20	Thomas Ulsrud	Steffen Walstad	Markus Høiberg	Magnus Vågberg	Magnus Nedregotten	2019 ECC
2020–21	Thomas Ulsrud	Torger Nergård	Markus Høiberg	Magnus Vågberg		

== Grand Slam record ==
Key
C	Champion
F	Lost in Final
SF	Lost in Semifinal
QF	Lost in Quarterfinals
R16	Lost in the round of 16
Q	Did not advance to playoffs
T2	Played in Tier 2 event
DNP	Did not participate in event
N/A	Not a Grand Slam event that season

Event	2006–07	2007–08	2008–09	2009–10	2010–11	2011–12	2012–13	2013–14	2014–15	2015–16	2016–17	2017–18
Tour Challenge	N/A	N/A	N/A	N/A	N/A	N/A	N/A	N/A	N/A	DNP	SF	DNP
Masters	DNP	DNP	Q	SF	Q	Q	Q	Q	Q	Q	DNP	Q
The National	Q	DNP	DNP	DNP	DNP	QF	Q	DNP	DNP	QF	DNP	DNP
Canadian Open	Q	DNP	QF	SF	Q	DNP	DNP	Q	DNP	DNP	DNP	Q
Players' Championships	DNP	DNP	DNP	DNP	DNP	DNP	QF	DNP	DNP	DNP	DNP	DNP
