= 2007 BDO Classic Canadian Open of Curling (January) =

Grand Slam of Curling event

The 2006-07 BDO Classic Canadian Open of Curling was held January 24–28, 2007 at the MTS Centre in Winnipeg, Manitoba.

== Standings ==
=== Group A ===
Skip	W	L
(Manitoba) Jeff Stoughton	5	0
(Alberta) Kevin Martin	4	1
(Alberta) Don Walchuk	2	3
(Newfoundland and Labrador) Brad Gushue	2	3
(Quebec) Pierre Charette	1	4
(Sweden) Nils Carlsén	1	4

=== Group B ===
Skip	W	L
(Alberta) Randy Ferbey	4	1
(Ontario) Wayne Middaugh	4	1
(Saskatchewan) Pat Simmons	3	2
(Alberta) Mark Johnson	3	2
(Quebec) Jean-Michel Ménard	1	4
(Norway) Thomas Ulsrud	0	5

=== Group C ===
Skip	W	L
(Ontario) Glenn Howard	5	0
(Alberta) Kevin Koe	3	2
(Manitoba) Kerry Burtnyk	3	2
(United States) Craig Disher	2	3
(Ontario) John Base	2	3
(Norway) Pål Trulsen	1	4

== Play-offs ==
Quarter-Finals
(Ontario)	Glenn Howard	6
(Saskatchewan)	Pat Simmons	5
(Alberta)	Kevin Martin	5
(Ontario)	Wayne Middaugh	3
(Manitoba)	Jeff Stoughton	3
(Alberta)	Kevin Koe	5
(Alberta)	Randy Ferbey	5
(Alberta)	Mark Johnson	4

Semi-Finals
(Ontario)	Glenn Howard	3
(Alberta)	Kevin Martin	5
(Alberta)	Kevin Koe	5
(Alberta)	Randy Ferbey	7

Final
(Alberta)	Kevin Martin	7
(Alberta)	Randy Ferbey	4
