= Kevin Koe =

Canadian curler (born 1975)

- Curler
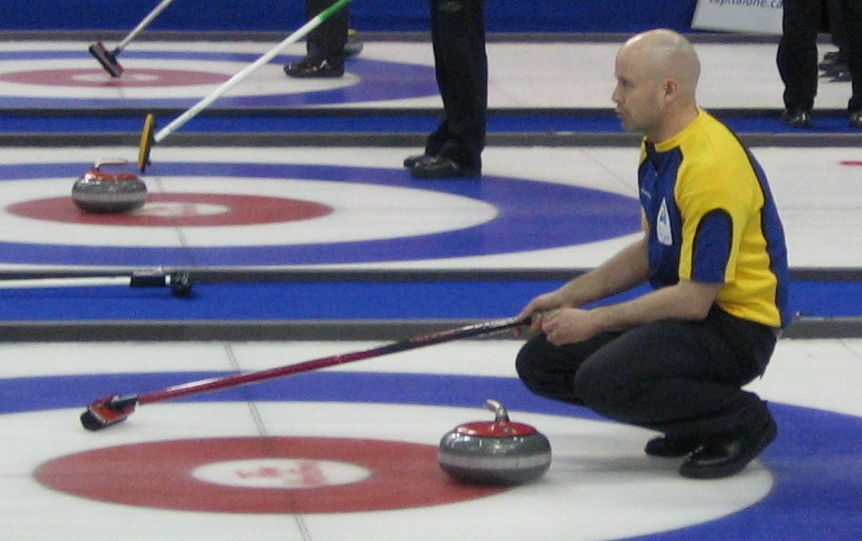
- Koe in 2010
- Born: January 11, 1975 (age 51); Edmonton, Alberta, Canada

Team
- Curling club: The Glencoe Club, Calgary, AB
- Skip: Kevin Koe
- Third: Johnson Tao
- Second: Aaron Sluchinski
- Lead: Karrick Martin

Curling career
- Member Association: Northwest Territories (1989–1994; 1998–1999); Alberta (1994–1998; 1999–present)
- Brier: 14 (2010, 2012, 2014, 2015, 2016, 2017, 2019, 2020, 2021, 2022, 2023, 2024, 2025, 2026)
- World Championship: 4 (2010, 2014, 2016, 2019)
- Olympic: 1 (2018)
- Top CTRS ranking: 1st (2015–16)
- Grand Slam victories: 6 (2004 Players', 2012 Masters, 2013 Canadian Open, 2015 Tour Challenge, 2018 Players', 2023 Players')
Medal record
Representing Canada
Men's curling
World Curling Championships
Gold medal – first place	2010 Cortina d'Ampezzo
Gold medal – first place	2016 Basel
Silver medal – second place	2019 Lethbridge
Tim Hortons Brier
Silver medal – second place	2017 St. John's
Representing Alberta
Tim Hortons Brier
Gold medal – first place	2010 Halifax
Gold medal – first place	2014 Kamloops
Gold medal – first place	2016 Ottawa
Gold medal – first place	2019 Brandon
Silver medal – second place	2012 Saskatoon
Silver medal – second place	2022 Lethbridge
Silver medal – second place	2026 St. John's
Canadian Olympic Curling Trials
Gold medal – first place	2017 Ottawa
Bronze medal – third place	2005 Halifax
Bronze medal – third place	2021 Saskatoon
Representing Northwest Territories
Arctic Winter Games
Silver medal – second place	1994 Slave Lake
Representing (Alberta) Wild Card
Tim Hortons Brier
Silver medal – second place	2021 Calgary

Kevin Koe (/ˈkuːiː/ KOO-ee; born January 11, 1975) is a Canadian curler. Koe is a two-time World champion and four-time Canadian champion. He was the skip of the Canadian men's team at the 2018 Winter Olympics in Pyeongchang.

Originally from Yellowknife, Northwest Territories, Koe now resides in Calgary, Alberta and curls out of The Glencoe Club. He learned to curl at the age of six in Inuvik, Northwest Territories.

== Career ==
=== Junior career ===
After several trips to the territorial junior men's curling championships, Koe finally won in 1994. This earned him the right to skip the Northwest Territories/Yukon team at the 1994 Canadian Junior Curling Championships. He led the team, which consisted of his brother Jamie at third, second Mark Whitehead and lead Kevin Whitehead to an 8–3 round robin record, in a three-way tie for first. This gave them a direct spot into the final against Alberta's Colin Davison, to whom they lost 6–5 amidst a controversy involving a burnt rock. The following year, he moved to Alberta for school, and made it to the finals of the 1995 Alberta Junior championships, where he lost to Cameron Dechant. It was his team's only loss in the tournament.

=== Early men's career in Edmonton ===
After university, Koe stayed in the more competitive province of Alberta, first settling in Edmonton.

Koe's early career included skipping Team Alberta at the 2000 Canadian Mixed Curling Championship, with teammates Susan O'Connor, Greg Northcott and Lawnie Goodfellow. He led the team to an 8–3 round robin record, and won both of their playoff games to claim the Canadian Mixed title. His early career on the World Curling Tour included winning the 1999 Dunlop Ford Cash Classic and the 2002 Pointoptical Curling Classic.

From 2003 to 2006 he played third for John Morris, with whom Koe would win his first Grand Slam event, the 2004 Players' Championship. The team played in the 2005 Canadian Olympic Curling Trials, going 6–3 in the round robin, and losing in the semifinal. During this time, the team would also win the 2005 Meyers Norris Penny Charity Classic. In 2006, Koe left the Morris rink and formed his own team with Blake MacDonald throwing fourth stones, Koe skipping at third, Carter Rycroft at second and Nolan Thiessen at lead. In their first season together, Koe would win the 2006 Roaming Buffalo Classic.

Up until 2010, Koe had little success in his attempts to win a provincial title on the men's stage, as he and his rink were in the shadows of fellow Edmontonian Kevin Martin, widely considered to be one of the best curlers of all time. In 2007, he almost went to the Brier, but lost in the provincial finals to Kevin Martin. In both the 10th and 11th ends, his team's then-fourth player, Blake MacDonald (Koe skipped and threw third stones) had a draw to the eight-foot to win, but missed on both opportunities. The next season, the team would win the 2007 John Shea Insurance Canada Cup Qualifier.

Two months after winning the Twin Anchors Invitational, the team played in the 2009 Canadian Olympic Curling Trials, finishing the round robin with a 4–3 record, missing the playoffs. Later that season, Koe finally won a provincial championship, benefiting from an absent Martin who would be preparing for the 2010 Winter Olympics. Koe went on to win the 2010 Brier, beating Ontario's Glenn Howard in the final. Koe's rink became the first team to come out of the 3 vs. 4 page playoff game to win the Brier, and he became the first rookie skip to win the Brier since Vic Peters in 1992. Koe finished with a 9–2 round robin record at the 2010 Capital One World Men's Curling Championship, finishing second behind Norway. However, in the playoffs, Koe beat Norway twice to claim his first world title.

The season following their World championship, the Koe rink would win three World Curling Tour events, the 2010 Twin Anchors Invitational, the Skookum WCT Cash Spiel and the March 2011 DeKalb Superspiel. They would not repeat their World title however, as they would lose in the final of the 2011 Boston Pizza Cup to Kevin Martin.

=== Move to Calgary (2011–2014) ===
Koe moved to Calgary in 2011. At the same time, his long-time fourth, Blake MacDonald, retired, and was replaced by Pat Simmons. Koe returned to the Brier in 2012, for the second time in his career. In doing so, he broke an 18-year drought for the city of Calgary in winning the Alberta provincial championship, representing the city's Glencoe Club. He was helped by the fact that the Olympic champion Kevin Martin rink lost in the semifinal, avoiding a final match-up of province's top two ranked teams. At the 2012 Tim Hortons Brier, Koe led Team Alberta to an 8–3 record. In the playoffs he had to face off against his brother Jamie's team from the Northwest Territories in the 3 vs. 4 game, which he won. He then won the semifinal, before losing to Ontario (skipped by Glenn Howard) in the final. Also that season, Koe won the TSN Skins Game event, pocketing $43,900 for his team.

Koe finally won his first Grand Slam title as a skip at the 2012 Masters. After going 3–2 in the group stage, he led his team to three straight playoff wins to claim the title. Also that season, he won the 2012 Canad Inns Prairie Classic and the 2012 Cactus Pheasant Classic. The next season, Koe won another slam title at the 2013 Canadian Open of Curling, losing just one game in the process. The next month, Team Koe played in the 2013 Canadian Olympic Curling Trials, but finished with a 2–5 record, missing the playoffs. On the tour, the team won the 2013 Prestige Hotels & Resorts Curling Classic.

Koe's rink won their second provincial title in 2014, finally defeating Kevin Martin in the final. At the 2014 Brier Koe's rink won their second Canadian championship, defeating John Morris' British Columbia rink 10–5 in the final. Koe's rink then went on to represent Canada at the 2014 World Men's Curling Championship. After finishing the round robin in 2nd place with an 8–3 record, the team collapsed in the playoffs, losing all three of their games, including the bronze medal game, settling for fourth place.

=== A new team (2014–2018) ===
Koe's win at the 2014 Brier gave his team an automatic bye (as Team Canada) at the 2015 Tim Hortons Brier, following a rule change by the Canadian Curling Association. However, Koe announced that he was leaving his team to form a new team to prepare for the 2018 Olympics in South Korea, leaving him ineligible to represent Team Canada at the 2015 Brier. Somewhat ironically, Koe's former teammates recruited 2014 runner-up Morris to skip Team Canada for the 2015 Brier. Koe's new team consisted of lead Ben Hebert and third Marc Kennedy who had previously played on the 2010 Olympic champion Kevin Martin rink and second Brent Laing from Ontario who had left the Glenn Howard rink. With his new team, Koe successfully repeated as Albertan champion in the 2015 Boston Pizza Cup, which qualified him to represent Alberta at the 2015 Tim Hortons Brier. There, he led his new team to a 6–5 record, missing the playoffs. On the tour, his new team won the Direct Horizontal Drilling Fall Classic and the Karuizawa International Curling Championship.

Koe and his new rink found more success in the 2015–16 season. The team began the season by winning the inaugural GSOC Tour Challenge Grand Slam event. They would also win the 2015 Canada Cup of Curling and would go on to win the 2016 Boston Pizza Cup, sending their team to that year's Brier. After going 8–3 at the 2016 Tim Hortons Brier, Koe and his foursome railed off three straight victories in the playoffs (again having to come out of the 3 vs. 4 game), defeating Newfoundland and Labrador's Brad Gushue in the final. The team would represent Canada at the 2016 World Men's Curling Championship, losing just one game en route to winning the gold medal. Koe led Canada to a 5–3 win over Denmark, skipped by Rasmus Stjerne, in the final. On the tour, the team won the Direct Horizontal Drilling Fall Classic again and the Mercure Perth Masters. They would finish the season in first place on the World Curling Tour Order of Merit rankings and in the CTRS standings.

Koe's win at the 2016 Brier qualified the team to represent Team Canada at the 2017 Tim Hortons Brier. Koe again led his team to an 8–3 round robin record, and again had to fight through the 3 vs. 4 game and the semifinals in the playoffs to make it to the final, where he faced Brad Gushue in a re-match of the 2016 Brier. However, Gushue and his Newfoundland rink would win the re-match in front of a partisan home crowd. Earlier in the year, Koe would win the 2017 Pinty's All-Star Curling Skins Game, winning $71,000 for his team. On the tour, the team would win the AMJ Campbell Shorty Jenkins Classic and the Red Deer Curling Classic.

==== 2018 Winter Olympics ====
Later in the year, Team Koe played in the 2017 Canadian Olympic Curling Trials, leading his team to a 7–1 round robin record, which put him in the final against Mike McEwen. Koe would get the better of McEwen, qualifying his rink to represent Canada at the 2018 Winter Olympics. At the Olympics, the team started off strong, winning their first four matches. In the semifinal match, Koe's team lost to John Shuster of the United States, the first time a Canadian team had failed to make the finals at the Olympics. The team then lost again in the bronze medal match versus Switzerland, to place fourth overall. Koe was the first skip to fail to medal at the Olympics in Canadian history. The team was devastated by the upset loss, with their head coach John Dunn telling CBC News a year later that "The Olympics will scar all of us who went through that forever."

On April 15, 2018, Koe won the Player's Championship Grand Slam of Curling event with a 6–2 victory over Niklas Edin of Sweden.

After the season, Kennedy and Laing left the team and were replaced with B. J. Neufeld and Colton Flasch.

=== Post Olympics (2018–2020) ===
Koe and his new team began the 2018–19 season by winning the first leg of the Curling World Cup, defeating Norway's Steffen Walstad in the final. They also reached the final of the Canad Inns Men's Classic, but were beaten by the Bottcher rink. They also lost in the final of the 2018 Canada Cup to the Brad Jacobs rink 5–4. They had previously gone 4–2 in the round robin and won both the tiebreaker and semifinal games. In February, Team Koe finished runner-up to Team Bottcher at the 2019 TSN All-Star Curling Skins Game, earning $36,000 for their second place finish. In provincial playdowns, the Koe rink lost two of their first three games at the 2019 Boston Pizza Cup, before winning five straight games to claim the Alberta provincial title. The team represented Alberta at the 2019 Tim Hortons Brier where they went undefeated throughout the entire tournament. After an 11–0 record through the round robin and championship pools, they beat Northern Ontario's Jacobs rink in the 1 vs. 2 game. They then faced the Bottcher rink in the final where, after a close game all the way through, Koe would execute a double takeout to score two in the tenth end and win the game 4–3 for his team. The win earned the team the right to represent Canada at the 2019 World Men's Curling Championship where they finished the round robin with a 9–3 record. They then won two playoff games to qualify for the final where they lost to Sweden's Niklas Edin rink 7–2, settling for silver. In Grand Slam play, the team failed to win any slams, but did make it to three finals at the 2018 Masters, the 2019 Players' Championship and the 2019 Champions Cup. They also reached the semifinals once and the quarterfinals in the three other events. Despite the lack of any event wins, their strong play was good enough to award them with the Pinty's Cup for the season's best Slam team. The team ended the season at the grand final of the Curling World Cup, where they beat the host Chinese team Zou Qiang in the final to secure another event title. Also during the 2018–19 season, the Koe rink along with five other teams represented North America at the 2019 Continental Cup where they lost by eight points.

Team Koe started their 2019–20 season at the 2019 AMJ Campbell Shorty Jenkins Classic and lost in the quarterfinal to Brad Jacobs. They lost the final of the Stu Sells Toronto Tankard to the Jacobs rink as well. In Grand Slam play, they made the semifinal of the 2019 Tour Challenge and the quarterfinals of the 2019 National. They then, however, missed the playoffs at both the 2019 Masters and the 2020 Canadian Open. At the 2019 Canada Cup, they finished the round robin with a 5–1 record, which qualified them directly for the final which they lost to the John Epping rink. To start 2020, Team Koe once again competed in the 2020 Continental Cup but were this time defeated by Team Europe by fifteen points. At the 2020 Tim Hortons Brier, representing Team Canada, they finished the championship pool with a 7–4 record, which was in a four-way tie for fourth. They faced Jacobs in the first round of tiebreakers where they lost 8–3 and were eliminated. It would be the team's last event of the season as both the Players' Championship and the Champions Cup Grand Slam events were cancelled due to the COVID-19 pandemic. On March 16, 2020, Team Koe announced they would be parting ways with second Colton Flasch. The following day, the team announced they would be adding John Morris to the team as their new second.

=== Morris joins the team (2020–2022) ===
Team Koe began the 2020–21 season at the McKee Homes Fall Curling Classic where they lost in the quarterfinals. Their next three events included a semifinal finish at the Ashley HomeStore Curling Classic and two runner-up finishes at both the ATB Banff Classic and the ATB Okotoks Classic. Due to the COVID-19 pandemic in Alberta, the 2021 provincial championship was cancelled. As the reigning provincials champions, Team Brendan Bottcher was chosen to represent Alberta at the 2021 Tim Hortons Brier. However, due to many provinces cancelling their provincial championships due to the COVID-19 pandemic in Canada, Curling Canada added three Wild Card teams to the national championship, which were chosen according to the CTRS standings from the 2019–20 season. Because Team Koe ranked 6th on the CTRS and kept at least three of their four players together for the 2020–21 season, they got the second Wild Card spot at the 2021 Brier in Calgary, Alberta. At the 2021 Tim Hortons Brier, Koe led his rink to a 10–2 round robin record, in first place. This gave them a bye to the final, where they played Team Alberta, skipped by Brendan Bottcher in a re-match of the 2019 Brier final. This time Bottcher won, with Koe and company taking home the silver medal. The team ended their season at the final two Slams of the season, the 2021 Champions Cup and the 2021 Players' Championship, reaching the semifinals of the Champions Cup.

The Koe rink won their first two events of the 2021–22 season, the ATB Okotoks Classic and the IG Wealth Management Western Showdown. At the first two Slams of the season, they reached the quarterfinals of the 2021 Masters and the semifinals of the 2021 National. They then competed in the 2021 Canadian Olympic Curling Trials, held November 20 to 28 in Saskatoon, Saskatchewan. Team Koe qualified for the Trials via their CTRS points as they finished in second place through the 2018–19 season. Through the round robin, Koe led his team of B. J. Neufeld, John Morris and Ben Hebert to a 6–2 record, only suffering losses to the Brad Gushue and Brad Jacobs rinks. This record earned them a place in the semifinal game where they faced the Jacobs' rink. Despite shooting a 96% game, the Koe rink lost the semifinal game 8–3 as Team Jacobs scored two four enders which ended the game early. After the game, Koe said that "It came to a quick thud out there, it sucks." In the new year, the team went undefeated to claim the 2022 Boston Pizza Cup. This earned them the right to represent Alberta at the 2022 Tim Hortons Brier where they finished with a 7–1 round robin record. They then won the seeding game against Saskatchewan's Colton Flasch and beat Team Canada's Brendan Bottcher in the 1 vs. 2 game to qualify directly for the final. There, they faced the Gushue rink. After a tight game all the way through, Team Gushue scored one in the extra end to win the game 9–8 and hand Team Koe their second consecutive Brier silver medal. They ended their season with two more playoff finishes at the 2022 Players' Championship and the 2022 Champions Cup, reaching the final of the latter.

In March 2022, Team Koe announced that they would be disbanding. It was later announced that Koe would skip a new team consisting of Tyler Tardi, Brad Thiessen and Karrick Martin for the 2022–23 season. Thiessen and Martin, formally members of Team Bottcher, would play front end while Tardi would play third.

=== New team (2022–present) ===
The new-look Koe foursome began the 2022–23 curling season playing in the inaugural 2022 PointsBet Invitational, and were knocked out in the quarterfinals to Reid Carruthers and his new-look team. The next month, the team played in their first Slam of the season, the 2022 National. After going 3–1 in pool play, the team lost in the quarters to Matt Dunstone, another new team. A couple of weeks later, the team played in the 2022 Tour Challenge, going 2–2 in pool play. This put them in a tiebreaker against John Epping, which they won. They then beat Joël Retornaz in the quarters before losing to Dunstone again in the semifinal. In December, the team played in their third slam of the season, the 2022 Masters. They failed to make the playoffs after posting a 1–3 record in pool play. The following month, the team again failed to make the playoffs at the 2023 Canadian Open. Koe won his eighth career provincial title in February at the 2023 Boston Pizza Cup. The team lost just two games en route to defeating the Brendan Bottcher rink in the Alberta final. They represented Alberta at the 2023 Tim Hortons Brier, where Koe led the rink to a 7–1 record in pool play. They would be eliminated in their first playoff game, however, losing to Ontario (skipped by Mike McEwen). The team wrapped up their season at the 2023 Players' Championship. There, the team went 4–1 in pool play, and then won all three of their playoff games, including defeating Switzerland's Yannick Schwaller rink in the final. To win, Koe had to make a triple takeout to score three with just seconds on his game clock. It would be the final event for Bradley Thiessen who is stepping away from the game. Thiessen will be replaced on the team by Jacques Gauthier for the 2023–24 curling season. During their first season together, the new Koe rink lost the final of the 2024 Boston Pizza Cup to Aaron Sluchinski. However, the rink still participated in the 2024 Montana's Brier as the top non-qualified team on the 2023–24 CTRS standings following provincial and territorial playdowns. At the Brier, the Koe rink, who was at the time the third ranked team in the country, finished pool play with a 2–6 record, failing to qualify for the playoffs. Koe called the feeling "about rock bottom" and blamed the team's failure on their draw weight during key moments.

After a poor showing during the 2023-24 season, the Kevin Koe rink announced at the beginning of the 2024-25 curling season that they would be parting ways with second Jacques Gauthier, and that Aaron Sluchinski will be joining the team at third, with Tardi moving to second. The team qualified for two Grand slam events, the 2024 Tour Challenge and 2024 Canadian Open where they went 2–3 and 1–3 respectively, failing to make the playoffs. The team however won the Alberta provincial men's championship, the 2025 Boston Pizza Cup, qualifying them to represent Alberta at the 2025 Montana's Brier. At the Brier, the team finished with a 4–4 record, missing the playoffs.

== Personal life ==
His brother, Jamie Koe, has represented the Territories in four of the last five Briers, while his sister Kerry has represented the Territories in five of the last six Scotties Tournament of Hearts. As of 2024, Koe has been coaching his sister's team. Chief Jim Koe of Aklavik, Kevin's grandfather, was the pioneer behind the family's involvement in curling. Kevin's father, Fred, a politician and former skip, participated at the 1999 Canadian Mixed Curling Championship alongside Jamie and Kerry. Fred is part of the Gwich'in First Nations tribe, which connects Kevin to the Indigenous community in the Northwest Territories. The Koe family received a recognition award at the Aboriginal Sports Circle of Northwest Territories awards dinner for their years of service in the curling community.

Koe, who was born in Edmonton, Alberta, attended École Sir John Franklin High School in Yellowknife, where he was later inducted into the Falcons Hall of Fame, before moving to Alberta to attend the University of Calgary. Koe was the recipient of the 2016 Scott-Mamini Memorial Award, for Male Athlete of the Year, given by the Calgary Booster Club. Koe works as a land and stakeholder coordinator with TransAlta Corporation. He is married and has two children.

== Grand Slam record ==
Key
C	Champion
F	Lost in Final
SF	Lost in Semifinal
QF	Lost in Quarterfinals
R16	Lost in the round of 16
Q	Did not advance to playoffs
T2	Played in Tier 2 event
DNP	Did not participate in event
N/A	Not a Grand Slam event that season

Event	2002–03	2003–04	2004–05	2005–06	2006–07	2007–08	2008–09	2009–10	2010–11	2011–12	2012–13	2013–14	2014–15	2015–16	2016–17	2017–18	2018–19	2019–20	2020–21	2021–22	2022–23	2023–24	2024–25	2025–26	2026–27
Invitational	N/A	N/A	N/A	N/A	N/A	N/A	N/A	N/A	N/A	N/A	N/A	N/A	N/A	C	Q	Q	QF	SF	N/A	N/A	SF	Q	Q	Q	Q
Masters	DNP	QF	Q	QF	QF	F	F	F	QF	QF	C	QF	QF	SF	Q	SF	F	Q	N/A	QF	Q	Q	DNP	T2	Q
National	DNP	DNP	QF	Q	F	F	Q	SF	Q	QF	SF	QF	Q	QF	QF	QF	SF	QF	N/A	SF	QF	Q	DNP	DNP	DNP
Open	DNP	DNP	SF	F	SF	Q	Q	Q	SF	Q	QF	C	SF	SF	Q	SF	QF	Q	N/A	N/A	Q	Q	Q	T2	DNP
Players'	Q	C	Q	QF	DNP	SF	QF	SF	SF	Q	Q	QF	QF	QF	QF	C	F	N/A	Q	QF	C	Q	DNP	DNP	
Champions Cup	N/A	N/A	N/A	N/A	N/A	N/A	N/A	N/A	N/A	N/A	N/A	N/A	N/A	QF	F	SF	F	N/A	SF	F	DNP	N/A	N/A	N/A	N/A
Elite 10	N/A	N/A	N/A	N/A	N/A	N/A	N/A	N/A	N/A	N/A	N/A	N/A	SF	SF	SF	SF	QF	N/A	N/A	N/A	N/A	N/A	N/A	N/A	N/A

== Teams ==
Season	Skip	Third	Second	Lead	Events
1989–90	Kevin Koe	Conan Donahue	Gordon McDermid	Brad Chorostkowski	
1990–91	Kevin Koe				
1991–92	Kevin Koe	Darcy Moshenko	Jaret Moshenko	Brad Chorostkowski	
1992–93	Kevin Koe	Jamie Koe	Mark Whitehead	Brad Chorostkowski	
1993–94	Kevin Koe	Jamie Koe	Mark Whitehead	Kevin Whitehead	1994 CJCC
1994–95	Kevin Koe	Dean Mamer	Bryce Weber	Rob Nobert	
1995–96	Mickey Pendergast	Kevin Koe	Kevin Pendergast	Doug Marks	1996 Alta.
1996–97	Mickey Pendergast	Kevin Koe	Kevin Pendergast	Bryan Blaylock	
1997–98	Mickey Pendergast	Kevin Koe	Kevin Pendergast	Eugene Doherty	
1998–99	Kevin Koe				1999 Terr.
1999–00	Kevin Koe	John Ferguson; Adrian Bakker	Scott Cripps	Jamie Koe	
2000–01	Kevin Koe	Jamie Koe	Scott Cripps	Mike Westlund	2001 Alta.
2001–02	Kevin Koe				
2002–03	Kevin Koe	Jamie Koe	Scott Cripps	Mike Westlund	2003 CC
2003–04	John Morris	Kevin Koe	Marc Kennedy	Paul Moffatt	2004 CC, 2004 Alta.
2004–05	John Morris	Kevin Koe	Marc Kennedy	Paul Moffatt	2005 CC, 2005 Alta.
2005–06	John Morris	Kevin Koe	Marc Kennedy	Paul Moffatt	2005 COCT, 2006 CC, 2006 Alta.
2006–07	Blake MacDonald (Fourth)	Kevin Koe (Skip)	Carter Rycroft	Nolan Thiessen	2007 Alta.
2007–08	Blake MacDonald (Fourth)	Kevin Koe (Skip)	Carter Rycroft	Nolan Thiessen	2008 CC, 2008 Alta.
2008–09	Blake MacDonald (Fourth)	Kevin Koe (Skip)	Carter Rycroft	Nolan Thiessen	2009 CC, 2009 Alta.
2009–10	Kevin Koe	Blake MacDonald	Carter Rycroft	Nolan Thiessen	2009 COCT, 2010 Alta., 2010 Brier, 2010 WCC
2010–11	Kevin Koe	Blake MacDonald	Carter Rycroft	Nolan Thiessen	2010 CC, 2011 Alta.
2011–12	Kevin Koe	Pat Simmons	Carter Rycroft	Nolan Thiessen	2011 CC, 2012 Alta., 2012 Brier
2012–13	Kevin Koe	Pat Simmons	Carter Rycroft	Nolan Thiessen	2012 CC, 2013 Alta.
2013–14	Kevin Koe	Pat Simmons	Carter Rycroft	Nolan Thiessen	2013 COCT, 2014 Alta., 2014 Brier, 2014 WCC
2014–15	Kevin Koe	Marc Kennedy	Brent Laing	Ben Hebert	2014 CC, 2015 Alta., 2015 Brier
2015–16	Kevin Koe	Marc Kennedy	Brent Laing	Ben Hebert	2015 CC, 2016 Alta., 2016 Brier, 2016 WCC
2016–17	Kevin Koe	Marc Kennedy	Brent Laing	Ben Hebert	2016 CC, 2017 Brier
2017–18	Kevin Koe	Marc Kennedy	Brent Laing	Ben Hebert	2017 COCT, 2018 OG
2018–19	Kevin Koe	B. J. Neufeld	Colton Flasch	Ben Hebert	2018 CWC/1st leg, 2018 CC, 2019 Alta., 2019 Brier, 2019 WCC, 2019 CWC/Final
2019–20	Kevin Koe	B. J. Neufeld	Colton Flasch	Ben Hebert	2019 CC, 2020 Brier
2020–21	Kevin Koe	B. J. Neufeld	John Morris	Ben Hebert	2021 Brier
2021–22	Kevin Koe	B. J. Neufeld	John Morris	Ben Hebert	2021 COCT, 2022 Alta., 2022 Brier
2022–23	Kevin Koe	Tyler Tardi	Bradley Thiessen	Karrick Martin	2023 Alta., 2023 Brier
2023–24	Kevin Koe	Tyler Tardi	Jacques Gauthier	Karrick Martin	2024 Alta., 2024 Brier
2024–25	Kevin Koe	Tyler Tardi	Jacques Gauthier (September)	Karrick Martin	
2024–25	Kevin Koe	Aaron Sluchinski	Tyler Tardi	Karrick Martin	2025 Alta., 2025 Brier
2025–26	Kevin Koe	Tyler Tardi	Aaron Sluchinski	Karrick Martin	2026 Alta., 2026 Brier
2026–27	Kevin Koe	Johnson Tao	Aaron Sluchinski	Karrick Martin	
