= 2009 BDO Canadian Open of Curling =

Grand Slam of Curling event

The 2009 BDO Canadian Open of Curling was held January 22-25 at the MTS Centre in Winnipeg, Manitoba.

Team Glenn Howard won the event, giving Howard a career grand slam.

== Preliminary round Standings ==
=== Pool A ===
Skip ($ rank)	W	L
(Alberta) Kevin Martin (1)	5	0
(Newfoundland and Labrador) Brad Gushue (4)	4	1
(Norway) Thomas Ulsrud (12)	3	2
(British Columbia) Bob Ursel (15)	1	4
(British Columbia) Greg McAulay (27)	1	4
(Scotland) Tom Brewster (114)	1	4

=== Pool B ===
Skip ($ rank)	W	L
(Manitoba) Kerry Burtnyk (10)	5	0
(Manitoba) Mike McEwen (13)	4	1
(Ontario) Glenn Howard (2)	3	2
(Ontario) Wayne Middaugh (5)	2	3
(Quebec) Jean-Michel Ménard (30)	1	4
(United States) Pete Fenson (35)	0	5

=== Pool C ===
Skip ($ rank)	W	L
(Manitoba) Jeff Stoughton (7)	5	0
(Saskatchewan) Joel Jordison (11)	3	2
(Alberta) Kevin Koe (6)	2	3
(Alberta) Randy Ferbey (3)	2	3
(Manitoba) Reid Carruthers (55)	2	3
(Saskatchewan) Pat Simmons (45)	1	4

== Playoffs ==
Quarter-Finals
(Alberta)	Kevin Martin	6
(Saskatchewan)	Joel Jordison	3
(Newfoundland and Labrador)	Brad Gushue	4
(Manitoba)	Mike McEwen	7
(Manitoba)	Jeff Stoughton	5
(Norway)	Thomas Ulsrud	3
(Manitoba)	Kerry Burtnyk	4
(Ontario)	Glenn Howard	6

Semi-Finals
(Alberta)	Kevin Martin	7
(Manitoba)	Mike McEwen	2
(Manitoba)	Jeff Stoughton	3
(Ontario)	Glenn Howard	5

Final
(Alberta)	Kevin Martin	4
(Ontario)	Glenn Howard	8
