= 2008 Masters of Curling (November) =

Grand Slam of Curling event

The 2008 Masters of Curling was held November 12–16, 2008 at the Waterloo Memorial Recreation Complex in Waterloo, Ontario.

Glenn Howard's rink won their third straight Masters tournament, defeating Kevin Koe's rink in the final. The event is not to be confused with the January event that happened in the same year, but the previous season. Both events featured Howard defeating Koe in the final.

== Draw ==
=== Pool A ===
Team	W	L
(Alberta) Randy Ferbey	5	0
(Ontario) Glenn Howard	4	1
(Manitoba) Kerry Burtnyk	3	2
(British Columbia) Greg McAulay	1	4
(Manitoba) Mike McEwen	1	4
(United States) Craig Brown	1	4

=== Pool B ===
Team	W	L
(Alberta) Kevin Martin	5	0
(Saskatchewan) Joel Jordison	3	2
(Norway) Thomas Ulsrud	3	2
(British Columbia) Bob Ursel	2	3
(Ontario) Wayne Middaugh	1	4
(Nova Scotia) Shawn Adams	1	4

=== Pool C ===
Team	W	L
(Newfoundland and Labrador) Brad Gushue	4	1
(Manitoba) Reid Carruthers	3	2
(Manitoba) Jeff Stoughton	3	2
(Alberta) Kevin Koe	3	2
(Switzerland) Ralph Stöckli	2	3
(Saskatchewan) Pat Simmons	0	5

=== Playoffs ===
Tie breakers:

- Stoughton 7-6 Burtnyk
- Koe 5-4 Ulsrud

Quarterfinals
(Alberta) Martin	5
(Alberta) Koe	6
(Newfoundland and Labrador) Gushue	4
(Saskatchewan) Jordison	3
(Alberta) Ferbey	2
(Manitoba) Stoughton	5
(Ontario) Howard	6
(Manitoba) Carruthers	4

Semifinals
(Alberta) Koe	3
(Newfoundland and Labrador) Gushue	2
(Manitoba) Stoughton	4
(Ontario) Howard	6

Finals
(Alberta) Koe	3
(Ontario) Howard	4
