= Blake MacDonald =

Canadian curler

- Curler
- Born: April 10, 1976 (age 50); Cold Lake, Alberta, Canada

Team
- Curling club: Saville Sports Centre, Edmonton, AB

Curling career
- Brier: 3 (1999, 2010, 2012)
- World Championship: 1 (2010)
- Top CTRS ranking: 3rd (2007-08)
- Grand Slam victories: 0
Medal record
Representing Canada
Men's Curling
World Curling Championships
Gold medal – first place	Cortina d'Ampezzo 2010
Tim Hortons Brier
Gold medal – first place	Halifax 2010
Silver medal – second place	Saskatoon 2012

Blake "Mac" MacDonald (born April 10, 1976) is a Canadian curler from St. Albert, Alberta.

== Career ==
For much of his career MacDonald played on Kevin Koe's team. Originally, MacDonald threw last rocks for the team while Koe threw third and skipped, but in 2009 the two switched throwing order and MacDonald moved to third. MacDonald has been playing with Koe since 2006. Prior to that, he threw fourth rocks for Jamie King. MacDonald has also skipped, and was also a member of the Ken Hunka and Brent MacDonald teams in the past.

Early on the Koe rink came up short in major competitions. The team did however win the Canada Cup of Curling in 2008. They won their first Brier in 2010, beating Ontario's Glenn Howard in the final, 6–5. MacDonald also played in the 1999 Labatt Brier, playing second for Hunka. The team finished 5–6.

MacDonald left Kevin Koe's team at the end of the 2010–2011 season and retired from professional curling. MacDonald returned as alternate for Koe during the 2012 Boston Pizza Cup and the 2012 Tim Hortons Brier.

MacDonald returned to competitive curling for the 2012–2013 season playing third for Jamie King, along with Scott Pfeifer and Jeff Erickson.
