= 2010 Cactus Pheasant Classic =

- Host city: Brooks, Alberta
- Arena: Brooks Curling Club
- Dates: Oct. 28-31
- Winner: Kevin Martin
- Curling club: Edmonton, Alberta
- Skip: Kevin Martin
- Third: John Morris
- Second: Marc Kennedy
- Lead: Ben Hebert
- Finalist: Wayne Middaugh

The 2010 Cactus Pheasant Classic was held October 28–31 in Brooks, Alberta, Canada. It was the only event taking place in Week 8 of the Men's World Curling Tour for the 2010-11 curling season. The total purse for the event was $70,000 Canadian dollars (CAD). The event format was a 24-team triple knockout, with eight teams qualifying into a single-elimination playoff round to determine the champion. The winner, was to qualify for the 2010 Canada Cup of Curling, but the winning rink (Kevin Martin) had already qualified.

== Participating teams ==
Skip	Third	Second	Lead	Locale
Ted Appelman	Tom Appelman	Brandon Klassen	Brendan Melnyk	(Alberta) Edmonton
Brent Bawel	Sean O'Connor	Mike Jantzen	Hardi Sulimma	(Alberta) Calgary
Craig Brown	John Shuster	Greg Johnson	Derrick Casper	(United States) Wisconsin
Carl deConinck Smith	Jeff Sharp	Chris Haichert	Jesse St. John	Saskatchewan
Niklas Edin	Sebastian Kraupp	Fredrik Lindberg	Viktor Kjäll	(Sweden) Karlstad
Scott Egger	Albert Gerdung	Terry Morishita	Robin Niebergall	(Alberta) Brooks
Sean Geall	Grant Dezura	Kevin Recksiedler	Kevin MacKenzie	(British Columbia) New Westminster
Warren Hassall	Jamie King	Scott Manners	Chris Hassall	Alberta
Glenn Howard	Richard Hart	Brent Laing	Craig Savill	(Ontario) Coldwater
Kevin Koe	Blake MacDonald	Carter Rycroft	Nolan Thiessen	(Alberta) Edmonton
Kevin Martin	John Morris	Marc Kennedy	Ben Hebert	(Alberta) Edmonton
Mike McEwen	B.J. Neufeld	Matt Wozniak	Denni Neufeld	(Manitoba) Winnipeg
Terry Meek	Dean Mamer	Greg Northcott	Eugene Doherty	(Alberta) Calgary
Wayne Middaugh	Joe Frans	Scott Howard	Scott Foster	(Ontario) Toronto
Yusuke Morozumi	Tsuyoshi Yamagushi	Tetsuro Shimizu	Kosuke Morozumi	(Japan) Karuizawa
Kevin Park	Chris Galbraith	Taren Gesell	Pat McCallum	(Manitoba) Winnipeg
Steve Petryk	Dan Petryk	Kevin Yablonski	Brad Chyz	(Alberta) Calgary
Paul Czeke	Brent Pierce (skip)	Jay Wakefield	John Cullen	British Columbia
Dean Ross	Don DeLair	Chris Blackwell	Sean Morris	(Alberta) Calgary
Robert Schlender	Chris Lemishka	Jessi Wilkinson	Darcy Hafso	(Alberta) Edmonton
Pat Simmons	Steve Laycock	Brennen Jones	Dallan Muyres	(Saskatchewan) Regina
Brock Virtue	JD Lind	Dominic Daemen	Matthew Ng	(Alberta) Calgary
Don Walchuk	Chris Schille	DJ Kidby	Don Bartlett	(Alberta) Edmonton
Xu Xiaoming	Zang Jialiang	Zhang Zhipeng	Ba Dexin	China

== Draw ==
=== A Event ===
Quarterfinals
(Manitoba) Kevin Park	4
(Alberta) Brent Bawel	5
(Sweden) Niklas Edin	4
(Alberta) Dean Ross	5
(Alberta) Don Walchuk	3
(Japan) Yusuke Morozumi	6
(Alberta) Kevin Koe	6
(United States) Craig Brown	3

Semifinals
(Alberta) Bawel	8
(Alberta) Ross	4
(Japan) Morozumi	4
(Alberta) Koe	7

Qualifier 1
(Alberta) Bawel	4
(Alberta) Koe	5

Quarterfinals
(Ontario) Wayne Middaugh	6
(China) Xu Xiaoming	3
(Manitoba) Mike McEwen	5
(Alberta) Steve Petryk	4
(Saskatchewan) C. deConinck Smith	5
(Alberta) Brock Virtue	6
(Ontario) Glenn Howard	7
(Alberta) Terry Meek	4

Semifinals
(Ontario) Middaugh	7
(Manitoba) McEwen	3
(Alberta) Virtue	3
(Ontario) Howard	6

Qualifier 2
(Ontario) Middaugh	7
(Ontario) Howard	3

Quarterfinals
(Saskatchewan) Pat Simmons	4
(Alberta) Warren Hassall	5
(Alberta) Ted Appelman	8
(British Columbia) Brent Pierce	2
(British Columbia) Sean Geall	5
(Alberta) Robert Schlender	6
(Alberta) Kevin Martin	7
(Alberta) Scott Egger	2

Semifinals
(Alberta) Hassall	4
(Alberta) Appelman	5
(Alberta) Schlender	1
(Alberta) Martin	7

Qualifier 3
(Alberta) Appelman	4
(Alberta) Martin	5

=== B Event ===
Round of 16
(Manitoba) Kevin Park	1
(Sweden) Niklas Edin	5
(Alberta) Don Walchuk	6
(United States) Craig Brown	3

Quarterfinals
(Alberta) Warren Hassall	7
(Sweden) Edin	6
(Alberta) Walchuk	6
(Alberta) Robert Schlender	7

Semifinals
(Alberta) Hassall	3
(Alberta) Schlender	4

Qualifier 4
(Alberta) Schlender	4
(Ontario) Glenn Howard	6

Round of 16
(China) Xu Xiaoming	2
(Alberta) Steve Petryk	5
(Saskatchewan) C. deConinck Smith	6
(Alberta) Terry Meek	4

Quarterfinals
(Alberta) Dean Ross	6
(Alberta) Petryk	8
(Japan) Yusuke Morozumi	1
(Saskatchewan) Smith	7

Semifinals
(Alberta) Petryk	5
(Saskatchewan) Smith	3

Qualifier 5
(Alberta) Petryk	6
(Alberta) Ted Appelman	3

Round of 16
(Saskatchewan) Pat Simmons	3
(British Columbia) Brent Pierce	6
(British Columbia) Sean Geall	7
(Alberta) Scott Egger	5

Quarterfinals
(Manitoba) Mike McEwen	6
(British Columbia) Pierce	5
(Alberta) Brock Virtue	2
(British Columbia) Geall	8

Semifinals
(Manitoba) McEwen	4
(British Columbia) Geall	7

Qualifier 6
(British Columbia) Geall	5
(Alberta) Brent Bawel	7

=== C Event ===
Round of 16
(Alberta) Dean Ross	4
(Japan) Yusuke Moroyumi	5
(British Columbia) Brent Pierce	3
(Alberta) Brock Virtue	5

Quarterfinals
(Sweden) Niklas Edin	4
(Alberta) Don Walchuk	3
(Japan) Moroyumi	2
(Manitoba) Mike McEwen	5
(Alberta) Warren Hassall	7
(Alberta) Virtue	3

Semifinals
(Sweden) Edin	5
(Manitoba) McEwen	2
(Alberta) Hassall	7
(Alberta) Ted Appelman	3

Qualifier 7
(Sweden) Edin	3
(Alberta) Hassall	6

Round of 16
(Manitoba) Kevin Park	6
(United States) Craig Brown	4
(China) Xu Xiaoming	3
(Alberta) Terry Meek	5
(Saskatchewan) Pat Simmons	8
(Alberta) Scott Egger	5

Quarterfinals
(Manitoba) Park	5
(Saskatchewan) C. deConinck Smith	3
(Alberta) Meek	6
(Saskatchewan) Simmons	5

Semifinals
(British Columbia) Sean Geall	5
(Manitoba) Park	4
(Alberta) Robert Schlender	7
(Alberta) Meek	5

Qualifier 8
(British Columbia) Geall	6
(Alberta) Schlender	4

=== Playoffs ===
Quarterfinals
(Alberta) Kevin Martin	4
(British Columbia) Sean Geall	1
(Ontario) Glenn Howard	8
(Alberta) Steve Petryk	2
(Ontario) Wayne Middaugh	5
(Alberta) Warren Hassall	3
(Alberta) Kevin Koe	7
(Alberta) Brent Bawel	2

Semifinals
(Alberta) Martin	6
(Ontario) Howard	3
(Ontario) Middaugh	7
(Alberta) Koe	3

Finals
(Alberta) Martin	5
(Ontario) Middaugh	4

== Payout ==
Place	Winnings
Champion	$22,000
Runner-up	$14,000
Semifinalist	$7,000
Quarterfinalist	$5,000
