= 2008 Boston Pizza Cup =

- Host city: Spruce Grove, Alberta
- Arena: Grant Fuhr Arena
- Dates: February 12–17
- Winner: Team Martin
- Curling club: Saville SC, Edmonton
- Skip: Kevin Martin
- Third: John Morris
- Second: Marc Kennedy
- Lead: Ben Hebert
- Finalist: Randy Ferbey

The 2008 Boston Pizza Cup, the men's curling championships for Alberta, was held from February 12 to 17 at the Grant Fuhr Arena in Spruce Grove, Alberta. The Kevin Martin rink won the final over Randy Ferbey's team and represented Alberta at the 2008 Tim Hortons Brier, which they also won.

This was the first Alberta provincial championship under the sponsorship of Boston Pizza, following the departure of Kia. Additionally, the format of the event was changed from a round robin to a triple-knockout.

== Qualification process ==
Qualification method	Berths	Qualifying team(s)
Defending Champion	1	Kevin Martin
CTRS Ranking	1	Randy Ferbey
ACF Bonspiel Points	2	Kurt Balderston; James Pahl
Peace Curling Association Playdown	2	Ron Chrenek; Jeff Ginter
Northern Alberta Curling Association Playdown	3	Kevin Koe; Shane Park; David Stewart
Southern Alberta Curling Association Playdown	3	Terry Meek; Darren Moulding; Steve Petryk

== Teams ==
The teams are listed as follows:

Skip	Third	Second	Lead
Kurt Balderston	Les Sonnenberg	Geoff Walker	Del Shaughnessy
Ron Chrenek	Kevin Chrenek	Tom Sallows	Dan Lemieux
David Nedohin (Fourth)	Randy Ferbey (Skip)	Scott Pfeifer	Marcel Rocque
Jeff Ginter	Len Holland	Kevin Turner	Larry Ziprick
Blake MacDonald (Fourth)	Kevin Koe (Skip)	Carter Rycroft	Nolan Thiessen
Kevin Martin	John Morris	Marc Kennedy	Ben Hebert
Terry Meek	Dean Mamer	Jason Stannard	Ryan Keirstead
Darren Moulding	Brock Virtue	Josh Lambden	Eugene Doherty
James Pahl	Mark Klinck	Brandon Klassen	Roland Robinson
Shane Park	Tony Germsheid	Matt Wood	Darcy Hafso
Steve Petryk	Kevin Park	Rob Schlender	David Harper
David Stewart	Bob Mitchell	Erik Brodersen	Kyle Dorchester

== Knockout brackets ==
=== A event ===
First Knockout	Qualifier 1
Kevin Martin	4
Shane Park	4	Shane Park	3
Terry Meek	3	Kevin Martin	5
James Pahl	4
Kurt Balderston	7
James Pahl	7	James Pahl	9
Ron Chrenek	5	Kevin Martin	6
Randy Ferbey	4
Randy Ferbey	5
Steve Petryk	9	Steve Petryk	3
David Stewart	4	Randy Ferbey	5
Kevin Koe	4
Kevin Koe	6
Darren Moulding	7	Darren Moulding	3
Jeff Ginter	6

=== B event ===
Second Knockout	Qualifier 2
Terry Meek	2
Kurt Balderston	8	Kurt Balderston	4
Kevin Koe	7
Kevin Koe	10
Ron Chrenek	4	James Pahl	8
Steve Petryk	8	Steve Petryk	6
James Pahl	7
Kevin Koe	4
David Stewart	7	Randy Ferbey	7
Darren Moulding	6	David Stewart	7
Jeff Ginter	1	Shane Park	4
Shane Park	10	David Stewart	2
Randy Ferbey	7

=== C event ===
Third Knockout	Qualifier 3
David Stewart	7
Terry Meek	10
Terry Meek	7
Ron Chrenek	3
Terry Meek	2
James Pahl	7
James Pahl	6
Shane Park	5

Third Knockout	Qualifier 4
Darren Moulding	4
Kevin Koe	8
Kurt Balderston	8
Kurt Balderston	7	Kurt Balderston	4
Jeff Ginter	5
Jeff Ginter	9
Steve Petryk	8

== Knockout results ==
All draw times are listed in Mountain Time (UTC-07:00).

=== Draw 1 ===
Tuesday, February 12, 7:30 pm

Sheet A	1	2	3	4	5	6	7	8	9	10	Final
Shane Park	1	0	0	0	1	1	0	0	0	1	4
Terry Meek	0	1	0	0	0	0	2	0	0	0	3

Sheet B	1	2	3	4	5	6	7	8	9	10	Final
Steve Petryk	2	2	0	3	0	1	0	1	X	X	9
David Stewart	0	0	1	0	1	0	2	0	X	X	4

Sheet C	1	2	3	4	5	6	7	8	9	10	Final
Darren Moulding	0	1	0	1	0	3	1	0	0	1	7
Jeff Ginter	3	0	0	0	1	0	0	0	2	0	6

Sheet D	1	2	3	4	5	6	7	8	9	10	Final
James Pahl	1	0	0	0	2	0	0	0	1	3	7
Ron Chrenek	0	0	0	2	0	0	1	2	0	0	5

=== Draw 2 ===
Wednesday, February 13, 9:00 am

Sheet A	1	2	3	4	5	6	7	8	9	10	Final
James Pahl	0	4	1	1	0	0	2	0	0	1	9
Kurt Balderston	2	0	0	0	0	2	0	2	1	0	7

Sheet B	1	2	3	4	5	6	7	8	9	10	Final
Darren Moulding	0	0	0	0	0	1	0	2	0	X	3
Kevin Koe	0	0	0	2	1	0	2	0	1	X	6

Sheet C	1	2	3	4	5	6	7	8	9	10	Final
Kevin Martin	0	2	0	0	0	1	0	0	0	1	4
Shane Park	0	0	0	0	2	0	0	0	1	0	3

Sheet D	1	2	3	4	5	6	7	8	9	10	Final
Randy Ferbey	1	2	0	0	1	0	0	0	1	X	5
Steve Petryk	0	0	0	0	0	0	2	1	0	X	3

=== Draw 3 ===
Wednesday, February 13, 2:00 pm

Sheet A	1	2	3	4	5	6	7	8	9	10	Final
Steve Petryk	0	0	1	0	2	0	1	1	1	2	8
Ron Chrenek	0	1	0	2	0	1	0	0	0	0	4

Sheet B	1	2	3	4	5	6	7	8	9	10	Final
Jeff Ginter	0	0	1	0	0	0	X	X	X	X	1
Shane Park	0	1	0	4	2	3	X	X	X	X	10

Sheet C	1	2	3	4	5	6	7	8	9	10	Final
David Stewart	0	1	1	0	1	3	0	0	0	1	7
Darren Moulding	1	0	0	3	0	0	0	1	1	0	6

Sheet D	1	2	3	4	5	6	7	8	9	10	Final
Terry Meek	0	0	1	0	1	0	0	0	X	X	2
Kurt Balderston	1	2	0	2	0	1	1	1	X	X	8

=== Draw 4 ===
Wednesday, February 13, 7:00 pm

Sheet A	1	2	3	4	5	6	7	8	9	10	Final
Randy Ferbey	0	0	0	1	0	1	0	1	0	2	5
Kevin Koe	0	0	0	0	2	0	1	0	1	0	4

Sheet B	1	2	3	4	5	6	7	8	9	10	Final
Kevin Martin	0	2	0	0	0	0	2	0	0	1	5
James Pahl	1	0	0	1	0	0	0	0	2	0	4

=== Draw 5 ===
Thursday, February 14, 2:00 pm

Sheet A	1	2	3	4	5	6	7	8	9	10	Final
David Stewart	0	0	1	0	0	2	1	0	3	X	7
Shane Park	0	2	0	0	1	0	0	1	0	X	4

Sheet C	1	2	3	4	5	6	7	8	9	10	Final
Kurt Balderston	0	2	0	1	0	0	0	1	0	0	4
Kevin Koe	1	0	2	0	0	1	0	0	0	3	7

Sheet D	1	2	3	4	5	6	7	8	9	10	11	Final
Steve Petryk	0	2	0	0	0	0	0	3	0	1	0	6
James Pahl	1	0	2	2	0	0	0	0	1	0	1	7

=== Draw 6 ===
Thursday, February 14, 7:00 pm

Sheet A	1	2	3	4	5	6	7	8	9	10	11	Final
Jeff Ginter	4	0	1	0	1	0	0	0	2	0	1	9
Steve Petryk	0	2	0	2	0	1	1	1	0	2	0	8

Sheet B	1	2	3	4	5	6	7	8	9	10	Final
Terry Meek	0	1	0	2	0	2	0	2	X	X	7
Ron Chrenek	0	0	1	0	1	0	1	0	X	X	3

Sheet C	1	2	3	4	5	6	7	8	9	10	Final
Kevin Martin	0	0	2	0	1	0	0	0	0	3	6
Randy Ferbey	1	0	0	1	0	1	0	0	1	0	4

Sheet D	1	2	3	4	5	6	7	8	9	10	Final
Darren Moulding	0	2	0	1	0	0	0	1	0	X	4
Kurt Balderston	1	0	3	0	1	1	1	0	1	X	8

=== Draw 7 ===
Friday, February 15, 2:00 pm

Sheet A	1	2	3	4	5	6	7	8	9	10	11	Final
Kevin Koe	2	0	2	0	1	0	0	0	3	0	2	10
James Pahl	0	1	0	2	0	0	0	2	0	3	0	8

Sheet D	1	2	3	4	5	6	7	8	9	10	Final
David Stewart	0	0	0	0	0	0	2	0	X	X	2
Randy Ferbey	0	1	0	0	1	1	0	4	X	X	7

=== Draw 8 ===
Friday, February 15, 7:00 pm

Sheet A	1	2	3	4	5	6	7	8	9	10	Final
David Stewart	1	0	2	0	1	0	2	0	1	X	7
Terry Meek	0	1	0	3	0	3	0	3	0	X	10

Sheet B	1	2	3	4	5	6	7	8	9	10	Final
Kurt Balderston	2	0	0	2	1	0	0	2	0	X	7
Jeff Ginter	0	1	0	0	0	1	1	0	2	X	5

Sheet C	1	2	3	4	5	6	7	8	9	10	Final
Kevin Koe	0	0	1	1	0	1	0	0	1	X	4
Randy Ferbey	2	1	0	0	3	0	1	0	0	X	7

Sheet D	1	2	3	4	5	6	7	8	9	10	Final
Shane Park	1	0	0	2	0	1	1	0	0	0	5
James Pahl	0	1	2	0	0	0	0	1	1	1	6

=== Draw 9 ===
Saturday, February 16, 2:00 pm

Sheet C	1	2	3	4	5	6	7	8	9	10	Final
Terry Meek	1	0	0	1	0	0	0	X	X	X	2
James Pahl	0	0	2	0	2	1	2	X	X	X	7

Sheet D	1	2	3	4	5	6	7	8	9	10	Final
Kurt Balderston	1	0	1	0	1	0	0	1	X	X	4
Kevin Koe	0	3	0	1	0	2	2	0	X	X	8

== Playoffs ==
Page playoff system
A	Kevin Martin	7
B	Randy Ferbey	6
C1	James Pahl	3
C2	Kevin Koe	6

Semifinal
B	Randy Ferbey	11
C2	Kevin Koe	7

Final
A	Kevin Martin	6
B	Randy Ferbey	3

=== A vs. B ===
Saturday, February 16, 7:00 pm

Sheet C	1	2	3	4	5	6	7	8	9	10	Final
Kevin Martin	1	0	0	1	0	3	0	1	0	1	7
Randy Ferbey	0	1	1	0	2	0	1	0	1	0	6

=== C1 vs. C2 ===
Saturday, February 16, 7:00 pm

Sheet A	1	2	3	4	5	6	7	8	9	10	Final
James Pahl	0	1	0	0	0	1	0	1	0	X	3
Kevin Koe	0	0	3	1	0	0	1	0	1	X	6

=== Semifinal ===
Sunday, February 17, 9:30 am

Team	1	2	3	4	5	6	7	8	9	10	Final
Randy Ferbey	2	0	2	0	2	0	2	0	3	X	11
Kevin Koe	0	2	0	1	0	2	0	2	0	X	7

=== Final ===
Sunday, February 17, 2:00 pm

Sheet C	1	2	3	4	5	6	7	8	9	10	Final
Kevin Martin	1	0	2	0	0	2	0	2	0	X	7
Randy Ferbey	0	2	0	1	0	0	1	0	0	X	4

2008 Boston Pizza Cup

Kevin Martin
9th Alberta Provincial Championship title
