= 2010 The National =

2010 The National can mean:

- 2010 The National (January)
- 2010 The National (December)
