= 2000 Players' Championship =

2000 GMC WCT Players' Championship
- Host city: Winnipeg, Manitoba
- Arena: Max Bell Centre
- Dates: March 14–19
- Winner: (Alberta) Kevin Martin
- Curling club: Ottewell CC, Edmonton
- Skip: Kevin Martin
- Third: Don Walchuk
- Second: Carter Rycroft
- Lead: Don Bartlett
- Finalist: (Ontario) Wayne Middaugh

The 2000 GMC WCT Players' Championship, the championship of the men's World Curling Tour for the 1999-00 curling season was held March 14–19, 2000 at the Max Bell Centre in Winnipeg, Manitoba. The total purse for the event was $150,000 with $42,400 going to the winning team.

Alberta's Kevin Martin defeated Ontario's Wayne Middaugh in the final, 6–4 in front of a "sparse crowd". It was Martin's third career Player's Championship title. Middaugh missed a draw for two in the seventh which would've tied the game. Martin made a double in the tenth to win the game. Team Martin third Don Walchuk struggled throughout the game with back pain, but persevered. With the win, the Martin rink earned a berth in the 2001 Canadian Olympic Curling Trials, which he would go on to win, and then went on to win the silver medal at the 2002 Winter Olympics.

Only two rinks in the top 20 tour money rankings did not participate, Team Greg McAulay and Team Russ Howard, who were coming off playing in the 2000 Labatt Brier final held on March 12. They were replaced by the Brad Hannah and Howard Restall.

The semifinals and finals were aired on television on CTV.

== Teams ==
The teams were as follows:

Skip	Third	Second	Lead	Locale	Season earnings to date ($CA)
Kerry Burtnyk	Jeff Ryan	Rob Meakin	Keith Fenton	Winnipeg, Manitoba	$48,500
Glen Despins	Art Paulsen	Dwayne Mihalicz	Phillip Germain	Strongfield, Saskatchewan	$42,000
David Nedohin	Randy Ferbey (skip)	Scott Pfeifer	Marcel Rocque	Edmonton, Alberta	$46,700
Paul Flemming	Mark Dacey	Blayne Iskiw	Tom Fetterly	Halifax, Nova Scotia	$20,000
Brad Hannah	Warren Hassall	Bryan Blaylock	Chris Hassall	Edmonton, Alberta	$18,500
Mike Harris	Richard Hart	Collin Mitchell	George Karrys	Toronto, Ontario	$23,500
Guy Hemmings	Don Westphal	Guy Thibaudeau	Dale Ness	Saint-Aimé, Quebec	$23,000
Bruce Korte	Darrell McKee	Roger Korte	Rory Golanowski	Saskatoon, Saskatchewan	$33,000
Peja Lindholm	Tomas Nordin	Magnus Swartling	Peter Narup	Östersund, Sweden	N/A
Kevin Martin	Don Walchuk	Carter Rycroft	Don Bartlett	Edmonton, Alberta	$41,980
Hammy McMillan	Warwick Smith	Ewan MacDonald	Peter Loudon	Inverness, Scotland	N/A
Chad McMullan	Travis Graham	Ross McFadyen	Jeff Steski	Winnipeg, Manitoba	$19,825
Wayne Middaugh	Graeme McCarrel	Ian Tetley	Scott Bailey	Midland, Ontario	$50,400
Rich Moffatt	Howard Rajala	Chris Fulton	Paul Madden	Ottawa, Ontario	$27,500
Dale Duguid (Note: Team Olson lead Charlie Salina could not play, so Duguid spared and skipped the team.)	Mark Olson	Peter Nicholls	Dean Dunstone	Winnipeg, Manitoba	N/A
Shane Park	Scott Park (skip)	Kerry Park	Pat McCallum (Note: Regular skip Kevin Park left the team, so McCallum was recruited to play lead, with the rest of the line-up being re-arranged.)	Edmonton, Alberta	$21,375
Lowell Peterman	Rob Armitage	Keith Glover	Steve Matejka	Red Deer, Alberta	N/A
Vic Peters	Dave Smith	Chris Neufeld	Don Harvey	Winnipeg, Manitoba	$46,800
Howard Restall	Stan Walker	Dave Kristy	Andy Hick	Winnipeg, Manitoba	$18,350
Ulrik Schmidt	Lasse Lavrsen	Brian Hansen	Carsten Svensgaard	Holte, Denmark	$22,896
Kelly Skinner	Kerry Hunka	William Lyburn	Gary Poole	Brandon, Manitoba	$20,125
Adam Spencer	Brad Savage	Jason Boyce	Trevor Wall	Guelph, Ontario	$20,300
Pat Spiring	Ken Tresoor	Jim Spencer	Scott Grant	Winnipeg, Manitoba	$19,500
Jeff Stoughton	Jon Mead	Garry Vandenberghe; Bob Jenion (Note: Jenion spared for Vandenberghe who had to go to Kelowna for a job interview, missing the first couple of days of competition.)	Doug Armstrong	Winnipeg, Manitoba	$47,000

=== Round-robin standings ===
The top two teams in each pool advanced to the playoffs.

Final round-robin standings

Key
Teams to Playoffs
Teams to Tiebreakers

Pool A	W	L
(Saskatchewan) Bruce Korte	4	1
(Ontario) Wayne Middaugh	3	2
(Manitoba) Kelly Skinner	3	2
(Scotland) Hammy McMillan	2	3
(Manitoba) Team Olson	2	3
(Nova Scotia) Paul Flemming	1	4

Pool B	W	L
(Alberta) Kevin Martin	3	2
(Manitoba) Chad McMullan	3	2
(Ontario) Rich Moffatt	3	2
(Ontario) Adam Spencer	3	2
(Manitoba) Kerry Burtnyk	2	3
(Alberta) Lowell Peterman	1	4

Pool C	W	L
(Saskatchewan) Glen Despins	4	1
(Alberta) Team Park	4	1
(Sweden) Peja Lindholm	3	2
(Ontario) Mike Harris	2	3
(Manitoba) Jeff Stoughton	2	3
(Manitoba) Pat Spiring	0	5

Pool D	W	L
(Alberta) Brad Hannah	4	1
(Quebec) Guy Hemmings	4	1
(Manitoba) Vic Peters	3	2
(Denmark) Ulrik Schmidt	2	3
(Alberta) Team Nedohin	1	4
(Manitoba) Howard Restall	1	4

== Scores ==
Scores were as follows:

=== Draw 1 ===
- Middaugh 8, McMillan 2
- Team Olson 6, Skinner 5
- Korte 8, Flemming 4
- Harris 7, Spiring 3
- Peters 10, Schmidt 2

=== Draw 2 ===
- Martin 7, McMullan 3
- Despins 10, Lindholm 5
- Team Park 10, Stoughton 7
- Moffatt 8, Peterman 4
- Spencer 6, Burtnyk 3

=== Draw 3 ===
- Hannah 10, Team Nedohin 6
- Hemmings 9, Restall 2
- Skinner 4, McMillan 3
- Korte 8, Team Olson 2
- Flemming 10, Middaugh 6

=== Draw 4 ===
- Moffatt 5, Burtnyk 4
- Spencer 7, Martin 6
- Peterman 8, McMullan 5
- Team Park 10, Despins 4
- Stoughton 9, Spiring 7

=== Draw 5 ===
- Lindholm 9, Harris 3
- Hannah 7, Peters 6
- Team Nedohin 8, Restall 7
- Hemmings 8, Schmidt 6
- Korte 4, McMillan 3

=== Draw 6 ===
- Team Olson 7, Flemming 4
- Skinner 8, Middaugh 5
- Martin 7, Moffatt 6
- McMullan 8, Spencer 5
- Burtnyk 9, Peterman 2

=== Draw 7 ===
- Despins 7, Spiring 5
- Harris 8, Stoughton 7
- Lindholm 5, Team Park 4
- Peters 6, Restall 5
- Hemmings 8, Team Nedohin 2

=== Draw 8 ===
- Schmidt 9, Hannah 1
- McMillan 10, Flemming 2
- Middaugh 8, Team Olson 3
- Korte 4, Skinner 3
- McMullan 8, Moffatt 3

=== Draw 9 ===
- Spencer 9, Peterman 7
- Burtnyk 6, Martin 5
- Despins 10, Harris 1
- Stoughton 8, Lindholm 1
- Team Park 11, Spiring 8

=== Draw 10 ===
- Hemmings 8, Peters 6
- Schmidt 7, Team Nedohin 4
- Hannah 7, Restall 3
- McMillan 11, Team Olson 4
- Skinner 9, Flemming 6

=== Draw 11 ===
- Team Park 8, Harris 5
- Lindholm 7, Spiring 5
- Moffatt 7, Spencer 6
- Martin 8, Peterman 5
- Despins 7, Stoughton 6

=== Draw 12 ===
- Middaugh 8, Korte 3
- Hannah 10, Hemmings 5
- McMullan 6, Burtnyk 5
- Peters 9, Team Nedohin 4
- Restall 6, Schmidt 3

=== Tiebreakers ===
- Martin 5, Spencer 4
- Middaugh 7, Skinner 6
- McMullan 10, Moffatt 5

== Playoffs ==
Quarterfinals
(Alberta) Brad Hannah	3
(Ontario) Wayne Middaugh	5
(Saskatchewan) Bruce Korte	7
(Quebec) Guy Hemmings	6
(Alberta) Kevin Martin	7
(Alberta) Team Park	6
(Saskatchewan) Glen Despins	7
(Manitoba) Chad McMullan	1

Semifinals
(Ontario) Wayne Middaugh	6
(Saskatchewan) Bruce Korte	5
(Alberta) Kevin Martin	6
(Saskatchewan) Glen Despins	5

Finals
(Ontario) Wayne Middaugh	4
(Alberta) Kevin Martin	6

=== Final ===
March 19, 11:30am

Team	1	2	3	4	5	6	7	8	9	10	Final
(Ontario) Wayne Middaugh	0	0	0	2	1	0	1	0	0	X	4
(Alberta) Kevin Martin 🔨	1	2	0	0	0	2	0	0	1	X	6
