= 2010 Canada Cup of Curling =

2010 Canadian event

2010 Canada Cup
- Host city: Medicine Hat, Alberta
- Arena: Medicine Hat Arena
- Dates: December 1–5
- Attendance: 29,126
- Men's winner: (Ontario) Glenn Howard
- Curling club: Coldwater & District CC; Coldwater, Ontario
- Skip: Glenn Howard
- Third: Wayne Middaugh
- Second: Brent Laing
- Lead: Craig Savill
- Finalist: (Alberta) Kevin Martin
- Women's winner: (Saskatchewan) Stefanie Lawton
- Curling club: Nutana CC; Saskatoon, Saskatchewan
- Skip: Stefanie Lawton
- Third: Sherry Anderson
- Second: Sherri Singler
- Lead: Marliese Kasner
- Finalist: (Alberta) Cheryl Bernard

The 2010 Canada Cup of Curling was held December 1–5, 2010 at the Medicine Hat Arena in Medicine Hat, Alberta.

The Glenn Howard rink won their first Canada Cup on the men's side, defeating Olympic gold medallist Kevin Martin in the final, 10–7. It had been 15 years since Howard and third Wayne Middaugh played together in a major curling final, with Middaugh subbing in for regular third Richard Hart. The team took home $25,000 for the win in addition to $4,000 won from wins in the round robin. Glenn Howard's win marks the first time that a non-Alberta men's team won a Canada Cup.

In the women's final, Stefanie Lawton won her second cup, defeating Olympic silver medallist Cheryl Bernard, 7–3. Her team also took home $25,000 plus $3,200 for her round robin wins. The win qualified the team for the 2011 Canada Cup of Curling and the 2012 Continental Cup of Curling.

== Qualification ==
=== Women's ===
- Defending champion: Shannon Kleibrink
- 2010 Scotties Tournament of Hearts champion: Jennifer Jones
- Canadian Olympic Team: Cheryl Bernard
- 2010 Players' Champion: Cheryl Bernard (replaced by next best team on the 2009-10 CTRS ranking list, Kelly Scott)
- 2010 Curlers Corner Autumn Gold Curling Classic winner: Bingyu Wang (ineligible; replaced by next best team on the CTRS, Heather Nedohin)
- 2010 Manitoba Lotteries Women's Curling Classic winner: Chelsea Carey
- 2010 Southwestern Ontario Women's Charity Cashspiel winner: Shelley Nichols
- 2009-10 CTRS team: Amber Holland
- 2009-10 CTRS team: Stefanie Lawton
- 2009-10 CTRS team: Krista McCarville

=== Men's ===
- Defending champion: Kevin Martin
- 2010 Tim Hortons Brier champion: Kevin Koe
- Canadian Olympic Team: Kevin Martin (replaced by next best team on the 2009-10 CTRS ranking list, Glenn Howard)
- 2010 Players' Champion: Brad Gushue
- 2010 Westcoast Curling Classic winner: Kevin Martin (replaced by Mathew Camm)
- 2010 Cactus Pheasant Classic winner: Kevin Martin (replaced by Brent Bawel)
- 2010 Challenge Casino Lac Leamy winner: Serge Reid
- 2009-10 CTRS team: Jeff Stoughton
- 2009-10 CTRS team: Randy Ferbey (replaced by Rob Fowler)
- 2009-10 CTRS team: Mike McEwen

== Men's ==
=== Teams ===
| Skip | Third | Second | Lead | Locale |
|---|---|---|---|---|
| Brent Bawel | Sean O'Connor | Mike Jantzen | Hardi Sulimma | (Alberta) Edmonton |
| Mathew Camm | Scott Howard | David Mathers | Andrew Hamilton | (Ontario) Ottawa |
| Brad Gushue | Randy Ferbey (skip) | Mark Nichols | Marcel Rocque | (Newfoundland and Labrador) / (Alberta) St. John's / Edmonton |
| Rob Fowler | Allan Lyburn | Richard Daneault | Derek Samagalski | (Manitoba) Winnipeg |
| Glenn Howard | Wayne Middaugh | Brent Laing | Craig Savill | (Ontario) Coldwater |
| Kevin Koe | Blake MacDonald | Carter Rycroft | Nolan Thiessen | (Alberta) Edmonton |
| Kevin Martin | John Morris | Marc Kennedy | Ben Hebert | (Alberta) Edmonton |
| Mike McEwen | B. J. Neufeld | Matt Wozniak | Denni Neufeld | (Manitoba) Winnipeg |
| Serge Reid | François Gionest | Simon Collin | Steeve Villeneuve | (Quebec) Jonquière |
| Jeff Stoughton | Jon Mead | Reid Carruthers | Steve Gould | (Manitoba) Winnipeg |

=== Round-robin standings ===
Key
| Teams to Playoffs |
| Teams to Tiebreaker |

| Group A | W | L |
|---|---|---|
| (Alberta) Kevin Martin | 5 | 0 |
| (Manitoba) Mike McEwen | 4 | 1 |
| (Alberta) Randy Ferbey | 3 | 2 |
| (Quebec) Serge Reid | 1 | 4 |
| (Ontario) Mathew Camm | 0 | 5 |

| Group B | W | L |
|---|---|---|
| (Ontario) Glenn Howard | 5 | 0 |
| (Alberta) Kevin Koe | 3 | 2 |
| (Manitoba) Jeff Stoughton | 3 | 2 |
| (Alberta) Brent Bawel | 1 | 4 |
| (Manitoba) Rob Fowler | 0 | 5 |

=== Round-robin results ===
==== Draw 2 ====
Wednesday, December 1, 12:30 pm

| Sheet A | 1 | 2 | 3 | 4 | 5 | 6 | 7 | 8 | 9 | 10 | Final |
|---|---|---|---|---|---|---|---|---|---|---|---|
| (Alberta) Randy Ferbey 🔨 | 2 | 0 | 1 | 0 | 0 | 1 | 1 | 2 | 0 | 0 | 7 |
| (Manitoba) Rob Fowler | 0 | 2 | 0 | 0 | 2 | 0 | 0 | 0 | 1 | 0 | 5 |

| Sheet B | 1 | 2 | 3 | 4 | 5 | 6 | 7 | 8 | 9 | 10 | Final |
|---|---|---|---|---|---|---|---|---|---|---|---|
| (Alberta) Kevin Martin 🔨 | 2 | 0 | 1 | 1 | 0 | 4 | X | X | X | X | 8 |
| (Quebec) Serge Reid | 0 | 1 | 0 | 0 | 1 | 0 | X | X | X | X | 2 |

| Sheet C | 1 | 2 | 3 | 4 | 5 | 6 | 7 | 8 | 9 | 10 | Final |
|---|---|---|---|---|---|---|---|---|---|---|---|
| (Manitoba) Mike McEwen | 1 | 0 | 1 | 0 | 1 | 0 | 0 | 2 | 1 | X | 6 |
| (Ontario) Mathew Camm 🔨 | 0 | 1 | 0 | 1 | 0 | 1 | 0 | 0 | 0 | X | 3 |

| Sheet D | 1 | 2 | 3 | 4 | 5 | 6 | 7 | 8 | 9 | 10 | Final |
|---|---|---|---|---|---|---|---|---|---|---|---|
| (Ontario) Glenn Howard 🔨 | 2 | 0 | 1 | 0 | 3 | 0 | 0 | 2 | 0 | X | 8 |
| (Manitoba) Jeff Stoughton | 0 | 1 | 0 | 0 | 0 | 2 | 1 | 0 | 1 | X | 5 |

| Sheet E | 1 | 2 | 3 | 4 | 5 | 6 | 7 | 8 | 9 | 10 | Final |
|---|---|---|---|---|---|---|---|---|---|---|---|
| (Alberta) Kevin Koe | 0 | 2 | 0 | 2 | 2 | 0 | 1 | 0 | 1 | 0 | 8 |
| (Alberta) Brent Bawel 🔨 | 1 | 0 | 2 | 0 | 0 | 1 | 0 | 1 | 0 | 1 | 6 |

==== Draw 4 ====
Wednesday, December 1, 8:30 pm

| Sheet A | 1 | 2 | 3 | 4 | 5 | 6 | 7 | 8 | 9 | 10 | Final |
|---|---|---|---|---|---|---|---|---|---|---|---|
| (Manitoba) Jeff Stoughton 🔨 | 0 | 0 | 4 | 0 | 1 | 0 | 0 | 0 | X | X | 5 |
| (Manitoba) Mike McEwen | 1 | 3 | 0 | 2 | 0 | 2 | 0 | 3 | X | X | 11 |

| Sheet B | 1 | 2 | 3 | 4 | 5 | 6 | 7 | 8 | 9 | 10 | 11 | Final |
|---|---|---|---|---|---|---|---|---|---|---|---|---|
| (Alberta) Brent Bawel 🔨 | 1 | 0 | 1 | 0 | 2 | 0 | 1 | 1 | 0 | 1 | 0 | 7 |
| (Ontario) Glenn Howard | 0 | 4 | 0 | 1 | 0 | 0 | 0 | 0 | 2 | 0 | 1 | 8 |

| Sheet C | 1 | 2 | 3 | 4 | 5 | 6 | 7 | 8 | 9 | 10 | 11 | Final |
|---|---|---|---|---|---|---|---|---|---|---|---|---|
| (Manitoba) Rob Fowler 🔨 | 1 | 0 | 1 | 0 | 2 | 0 | 1 | 0 | 0 | 1 | 0 | 6 |
| (Alberta) Kevin Koe | 0 | 1 | 0 | 0 | 0 | 3 | 0 | 1 | 1 | 0 | 1 | 7 |

| Sheet D | 1 | 2 | 3 | 4 | 5 | 6 | 7 | 8 | 9 | 10 | Final |
|---|---|---|---|---|---|---|---|---|---|---|---|
| (Ontario) Mathew Camm | 0 | 1 | 1 | 0 | 0 | 0 | X | X | X | X | 2 |
| (Alberta) Kevin Martin 🔨 | 3 | 0 | 0 | 2 | 1 | 1 | X | X | X | X | 7 |

| Sheet E | 1 | 2 | 3 | 4 | 5 | 6 | 7 | 8 | 9 | 10 | Final |
|---|---|---|---|---|---|---|---|---|---|---|---|
| (Quebec) Serge Reid 🔨 | 0 | 1 | 0 | 1 | 0 | 1 | 0 | X | X | X | 3 |
| (Alberta) Randy Ferbey | 4 | 0 | 1 | 0 | 1 | 0 | 2 | X | X | X | 8 |

==== Draw 5 ====
Thursday, December 2, 9:00 am

| Sheet A | 1 | 2 | 3 | 4 | 5 | 6 | 7 | 8 | 9 | 10 | Final |
|---|---|---|---|---|---|---|---|---|---|---|---|
| (Alberta) Kevin Koe 🔨 | 2 | 0 | 2 | 0 | 3 | 0 | 0 | 0 | 1 | X | 8 |
| (Quebec) Serge Reid | 0 | 2 | 0 | 2 | 0 | 0 | 0 | 1 | 0 | X | 5 |

| Sheet B | 1 | 2 | 3 | 4 | 5 | 6 | 7 | 8 | 9 | 10 | Final |
|---|---|---|---|---|---|---|---|---|---|---|---|
| (Alberta) Randy Ferbey 🔨 | 2 | 1 | 0 | 0 | 0 | 2 | 0 | 2 | X | X | 7 |
| (Ontario) Mathew Camm | 0 | 0 | 1 | 0 | 0 | 0 | 1 | 0 | X | X | 2 |

==== Draw 6 ====
Thursday, December 2, 1:30 pm

| Sheet B | 1 | 2 | 3 | 4 | 5 | 6 | 7 | 8 | 9 | 10 | Final |
|---|---|---|---|---|---|---|---|---|---|---|---|
| (Manitoba) Jeff Stoughton 🔨 | 0 | 1 | 0 | 1 | 0 | 1 | 0 | 1 | 0 | 1 | 5 |
| (Alberta) Kevin Koe | 0 | 0 | 0 | 0 | 1 | 0 | 0 | 0 | 2 | 0 | 3 |

| Sheet D | 1 | 2 | 3 | 4 | 5 | 6 | 7 | 8 | 9 | 10 | Final |
|---|---|---|---|---|---|---|---|---|---|---|---|
| (Manitoba) Rob Fowler | 1 | 0 | 4 | 1 | 1 | 2 | X | X | X | X | 9 |
| (Alberta) Brent Bawel 🔨 | 0 | 1 | 0 | 0 | 0 | 0 | X | X | X | X | 1 |

| Sheet E | 1 | 2 | 3 | 4 | 5 | 6 | 7 | 8 | 9 | 10 | Final |
|---|---|---|---|---|---|---|---|---|---|---|---|
| (Alberta) Kevin Martin 🔨 | 2 | 0 | 1 | 0 | 0 | 2 | 0 | 3 | X | X | 8 |
| (Manitoba) Mike McEwen | 0 | 2 | 0 | 1 | 0 | 0 | 1 | 0 | X | X | 4 |

==== Draw 7 ====
Thursday, December 2, 6:00 pm

| Sheet C | 1 | 2 | 3 | 4 | 5 | 6 | 7 | 8 | 9 | 10 | Final |
|---|---|---|---|---|---|---|---|---|---|---|---|
| (Alberta) Brent Bawel | 0 | 0 | 1 | 0 | 0 | 0 | 1 | 0 | X | X | 2 |
| (Manitoba) Jeff Stoughton 🔨 | 3 | 1 | 0 | 2 | 0 | 0 | 0 | 1 | X | X | 7 |

| Sheet D | 1 | 2 | 3 | 4 | 5 | 6 | 7 | 8 | 9 | 10 | Final |
|---|---|---|---|---|---|---|---|---|---|---|---|
| (Quebec) Serge Reid | 0 | 0 | 2 | 1 | 1 | 4 | X | X | X | X | 8 |
| (Ontario) Mathew Camm 🔨 | 1 | 1 | 0 | 0 | 0 | 0 | X | X | X | X | 2 |

| Sheet E | 1 | 2 | 3 | 4 | 5 | 6 | 7 | 8 | 9 | 10 | Final |
|---|---|---|---|---|---|---|---|---|---|---|---|
| (Manitoba) Rob Fowler | 1 | 0 | 0 | 1 | 1 | 0 | X | X | X | X | 3 |
| (Ontario) Glenn Howard 🔨 | 0 | 3 | 2 | 0 | 0 | 5 | X | X | X | X | 10 |

==== Draw 8 ====
Friday, December 3, 9:00 am

| Sheet A | 1 | 2 | 3 | 4 | 5 | 6 | 7 | 8 | 9 | 10 | Final |
|---|---|---|---|---|---|---|---|---|---|---|---|
| (Ontario) Mathew Camm | 0 | 0 | 1 | 0 | 0 | 0 | 2 | 0 | 1 | X | 4 |
| (Ontario) Glenn Howard 🔨 | 1 | 0 | 0 | 0 | 3 | 1 | 0 | 1 | 0 | X | 6 |

| Sheet B | 1 | 2 | 3 | 4 | 5 | 6 | 7 | 8 | 9 | 10 | Final |
|---|---|---|---|---|---|---|---|---|---|---|---|
| (Manitoba) Mike McEwen | 0 | 0 | 2 | 0 | 1 | 4 | 0 | 1 | X | X | 8 |
| (Alberta) Randy Ferbey 🔨 | 0 | 1 | 0 | 1 | 0 | 0 | 1 | 0 | X | X | 3 |

==== Draw 9 ====
Friday, December 3, 1:30 pm

| Sheet A | 1 | 2 | 3 | 4 | 5 | 6 | 7 | 8 | 9 | 10 | Final |
|---|---|---|---|---|---|---|---|---|---|---|---|
| (Alberta) Brent Bawel | 1 | 0 | 0 | 0 | 0 | 1 | X | X | X | X | 2 |
| (Alberta) Kevin Martin 🔨 | 0 | 2 | 1 | 2 | 3 | 0 | X | X | X | X | 8 |

| Sheet C | 1 | 2 | 3 | 4 | 5 | 6 | 7 | 8 | 9 | 10 | Final |
|---|---|---|---|---|---|---|---|---|---|---|---|
| (Quebec) Serge Reid | 0 | 1 | 0 | 1 | 0 | 0 | 1 | 0 | X | X | 3 |
| (Manitoba) Mike McEwen 🔨 | 0 | 0 | 1 | 0 | 1 | 2 | 0 | 3 | X | X | 7 |

| Sheet E | 1 | 2 | 3 | 4 | 5 | 6 | 7 | 8 | 9 | 10 | Final |
|---|---|---|---|---|---|---|---|---|---|---|---|
| (Manitoba) Jeff Stoughton | 0 | 1 | 1 | 0 | 4 | 0 | 0 | 0 | 3 | X | 9 |
| (Manitoba) Rob Fowler 🔨 | 2 | 0 | 0 | 1 | 0 | 0 | 2 | 0 | 0 | X | 3 |

==== Draw 10 ====
Friday, December 3, 6:00 pm

| Sheet C | 1 | 2 | 3 | 4 | 5 | 6 | 7 | 8 | 9 | 10 | Final |
|---|---|---|---|---|---|---|---|---|---|---|---|
| (Alberta) Kevin Martin | 2 | 0 | 2 | 0 | 2 | 0 | 3 | 0 | 2 | X | 11 |
| (Alberta) Randy Ferbey 🔨 | 0 | 2 | 0 | 3 | 0 | 1 | 0 | 2 | 0 | X | 8 |

| Sheet E | 1 | 2 | 3 | 4 | 5 | 6 | 7 | 8 | 9 | 10 | Final |
|---|---|---|---|---|---|---|---|---|---|---|---|
| (Ontario) Glenn Howard 🔨 | 1 | 0 | 2 | 0 | 1 | 0 | 0 | 1 | 1 | 2 | 8 |
| (Alberta) Kevin Koe | 0 | 1 | 0 | 3 | 0 | 2 | 0 | 0 | 0 | 0 | 6 |

=== Tiebreaker ===
Friday, December 3, 9:30 pm

| Team | 1 | 2 | 3 | 4 | 5 | 6 | 7 | 8 | 9 | 10 | Final |
|---|---|---|---|---|---|---|---|---|---|---|---|
| (Manitoba) Jeff Stoughton | 0 | 2 | 0 | 2 | 0 | 0 | X | X | X | X | 4 |
| (Alberta) Kevin Koe | 2 | 0 | 4 | 0 | 2 | 3 | X | X | X | X | 11 |

=== Playoffs ===
Page playoff system
A1 | (Alberta) Kevin Martin | 7
B1 | (Ontario) Glenn Howard | 4
A2 | (Manitoba) Mike McEwen | 7
B2 | (Alberta) Kevin Koe | 10

Semifinal
B1 | (Ontario) Glenn Howard | 10
B2 | (Alberta) Kevin Koe | 7

Final
A1 | (Alberta) Kevin Martin | 7
B1 | (Ontario) Glenn Howard | 10

==== 1 vs. 2 ====
Saturday, December 4, 8:30 am

| Sheet D | 1 | 2 | 3 | 4 | 5 | 6 | 7 | 8 | 9 | 10 | Final |
|---|---|---|---|---|---|---|---|---|---|---|---|
| (Alberta) Kevin Martin 🔨 | 2 | 1 | 0 | 0 | 0 | 1 | 0 | 1 | 1 | 1 | 7 |
| (Ontario) Glenn Howard | 0 | 0 | 0 | 0 | 2 | 0 | 2 | 0 | 0 | 0 | 4 |

==== 3 vs. 4 ====
Saturday, December 4, 8:30 am

| Sheet B | 1 | 2 | 3 | 4 | 5 | 6 | 7 | 8 | 9 | 10 | Final |
|---|---|---|---|---|---|---|---|---|---|---|---|
| (Manitoba) Mike McEwen 🔨 | 1 | 0 | 3 | 0 | 1 | 0 | 1 | 0 | 1 | X | 7 |
| (Alberta) Kevin Koe | 0 | 2 | 0 | 3 | 0 | 3 | 0 | 2 | 0 | X | 10 |

==== Semifinal ====
Saturday, December 4, 6:30 pm

| Sheet C | 1 | 2 | 3 | 4 | 5 | 6 | 7 | 8 | 9 | 10 | Final |
|---|---|---|---|---|---|---|---|---|---|---|---|
| (Ontario) Glenn Howard 🔨 | 2 | 0 | 0 | 4 | 0 | 1 | 0 | 2 | 0 | 0 | 9 |
| (Alberta) Kevin Koe | 0 | 1 | 2 | 0 | 1 | 0 | 1 | 0 | 0 | 2 | 7 |

==== Final ====
Sunday, December 5, 12:30 pm

| Sheet C | 1 | 2 | 3 | 4 | 5 | 6 | 7 | 8 | 9 | 10 | Final |
|---|---|---|---|---|---|---|---|---|---|---|---|
| (Alberta) Kevin Martin | 1 | 0 | 0 | 1 | 0 | 2 | 1 | 0 | 2 | 0 | 7 |
| (Ontario) Glenn Howard 🔨 | 0 | 3 | 0 | 0 | 2 | 0 | 0 | 2 | 0 | 3 | 10 |

== Women's ==
=== Teams ===
| Skip | Third | Second | Lead | Locale |
|---|---|---|---|---|
| Cheryl Bernard | Susan O'Connor | Carolyn Darbyshire | Cori Morris | (Alberta) Calgary |
| Chelsea Carey | Kristy Jenion | Kristen Foster | Lindsay Titheridge | (Manitoba) Morden |
| Amber Holland | Kim Schneider | Tammy Schneider | Heather Kalenchuk | (Saskatchewan) Kronau |
| Jennifer Jones | Kaitlyn Lawes | Jill Officer | Dawn Askin | (Manitoba) Winnipeg |
| Shannon Kleibrink | Amy Nixon | Bronwen Webster | Chelsey Bell | (Alberta) Calgary |
| Stefanie Lawton | Sherry Anderson | Sherri Singler | Marliese Kasner | (Saskatchewan) Saskatoon |
| Krista McCarville | Ashley Miharija | Kari MacLean | Sarah Lang | (Ontario) Thunder Bay |
| Heather Nedohin | Beth Iskiw | Jessica Mair | Laine Peters | (Alberta) Edmonton |
| Shelley Nichols | Stephanie LeDrew | Rhonda Rogers | Colette Lemon | (Newfoundland and Labrador) St. John's |
| Kelly Scott | Jeanna Schraeder | Sasha Carter | Jacquie Armstrong | (British Columbia) Kelowna |

=== Round-robin standings ===
Key
| Teams to Playoffs |

| Group A | W | L |
|---|---|---|
| (Alberta) Shannon Kleibrink | 5 | 0 |
| (Saskatchewan) Stefanie Lawton | 4 | 1 |
| (Manitoba) Jennifer Jones | 3 | 2 |
| (Manitoba) Chelsea Carey | 2 | 3 |
| (Newfoundland and Labrador) Shelley Nichols | 0 | 5 |

| Group B | W | L |
|---|---|---|
| (Alberta) Cheryl Bernard | 4 | 1 |
| (Ontario) Krista McCarville | 3 | 2 |
| (Saskatchewan) Amber Holland | 2 | 3 |
| (Alberta) Heather Nedohin | 2 | 3 |
| (British Columbia) Kelly Scott | 0 | 5 |

=== Round-robin results ===
==== Draw 1 ====
Wednesday, December 1, 8:30 am

| Sheet A | 1 | 2 | 3 | 4 | 5 | 6 | 7 | 8 | 9 | 10 | Final |
|---|---|---|---|---|---|---|---|---|---|---|---|
| (Alberta) Heather Nedohin 🔨 | 1 | 0 | 0 | 0 | 1 | 1 | 0 | 1 | 0 | 0 | 4 |
| (Alberta) Shannon Kleibrink | 0 | 2 | 1 | 0 | 0 | 0 | 2 | 0 | 2 | 1 | 8 |

| Sheet B | 1 | 2 | 3 | 4 | 5 | 6 | 7 | 8 | 9 | 10 | Final |
|---|---|---|---|---|---|---|---|---|---|---|---|
| (Saskatchewan) Stefanie Lawton 🔨 | 1 | 0 | 2 | 2 | 0 | 3 | 0 | 1 | 0 | 0 | 9 |
| (Newfoundland and Labrador) Shelley Nichols | 0 | 1 | 0 | 0 | 1 | 0 | 2 | 0 | 2 | 0 | 6 |

| Sheet C | 1 | 2 | 3 | 4 | 5 | 6 | 7 | 8 | 9 | 10 | Final |
|---|---|---|---|---|---|---|---|---|---|---|---|
| (Manitoba) Jennifer Jones 🔨 | 4 | 0 | 1 | 0 | 1 | 1 | 0 | 1 | 0 | X | 8 |
| (Manitoba) Chelsea Carey | 0 | 2 | 0 | 2 | 0 | 0 | 1 | 0 | 1 | X | 6 |

| Sheet D | 1 | 2 | 3 | 4 | 5 | 6 | 7 | 8 | 9 | 10 | Final |
|---|---|---|---|---|---|---|---|---|---|---|---|
| (Alberta) Cheryl Bernard | 0 | 2 | 1 | 0 | 0 | 0 | 1 | 0 | 1 | 1 | 6 |
| (British Columbia) Kelly Scott 🔨 | 1 | 0 | 0 | 1 | 0 | 0 | 0 | 1 | 0 | 0 | 3 |

| Sheet E | 1 | 2 | 3 | 4 | 5 | 6 | 7 | 8 | 9 | 10 | 11 | Final |
|---|---|---|---|---|---|---|---|---|---|---|---|---|
| (Saskatchewan) Amber Holland 🔨 | 0 | 1 | 0 | 1 | 0 | 1 | 0 | 1 | 0 | 2 | 0 | 6 |
| (Ontario) Krista McCarville | 0 | 0 | 1 | 0 | 1 | 0 | 3 | 0 | 1 | 0 | 1 | 7 |

==== Draw 3 ====
Wednesday, December 1, 4:30 pm

| Sheet A | 1 | 2 | 3 | 4 | 5 | 6 | 7 | 8 | 9 | 10 | Final |
|---|---|---|---|---|---|---|---|---|---|---|---|
| (Saskatchewan) Stefanie Lawton 🔨 | 0 | 1 | 4 | 2 | 2 | 0 | 0 | 4 | X | X | 13 |
| (British Columbia) Kelly Scott | 1 | 0 | 0 | 0 | 0 | 2 | 0 | 0 | X | X | 3 |

| Sheet B | 1 | 2 | 3 | 4 | 5 | 6 | 7 | 8 | 9 | 10 | Final |
|---|---|---|---|---|---|---|---|---|---|---|---|
| (Ontario) Krista McCarville | 0 | 1 | 1 | 0 | 1 | 0 | 0 | 2 | 0 | 3 | 8 |
| (Alberta) Cheryl Bernard 🔨 | 2 | 0 | 0 | 3 | 0 | 1 | 0 | 0 | 1 | 0 | 7 |

| Sheet C | 1 | 2 | 3 | 4 | 5 | 6 | 7 | 8 | 9 | 10 | Final |
|---|---|---|---|---|---|---|---|---|---|---|---|
| (Alberta) Heather Nedohin | 0 | 3 | 0 | 1 | 0 | 0 | 2 | 0 | 0 | 0 | 6 |
| (Saskatchewan) Amber Holland 🔨 | 1 | 0 | 0 | 0 | 2 | 0 | 0 | 1 | 2 | 1 | 7 |

| Sheet D | 1 | 2 | 3 | 4 | 5 | 6 | 7 | 8 | 9 | 10 | Final |
|---|---|---|---|---|---|---|---|---|---|---|---|
| (Newfoundland and Labrador) Shelley Nichols | 0 | 0 | 0 | 1 | 0 | 0 | 2 | 0 | X | X | 3 |
| (Manitoba) Jennifer Jones 🔨 | 3 | 0 | 0 | 0 | 3 | 2 | 0 | 2 | X | X | 10 |

| Sheet E | 1 | 2 | 3 | 4 | 5 | 6 | 7 | 8 | 9 | 10 | Final |
|---|---|---|---|---|---|---|---|---|---|---|---|
| (Manitoba) Chelsea Carey 🔨 | 0 | 0 | 1 | 0 | 1 | 0 | 0 | 2 | 0 | X | 4 |
| (Alberta) Shannon Kleibrink | 0 | 0 | 0 | 1 | 0 | 4 | 1 | 0 | 2 | X | 8 |

==== Draw 5 ====
Thursday, December 2, 9:00 am

| Sheet C | 1 | 2 | 3 | 4 | 5 | 6 | 7 | 8 | 9 | 10 | Final |
|---|---|---|---|---|---|---|---|---|---|---|---|
| (Manitoba) Chelsea Carey 🔨 | 2 | 0 | 1 | 0 | 0 | 3 | 0 | 2 | 0 | X | 8 |
| (Newfoundland and Labrador) Shelley Nichols | 0 | 1 | 0 | 0 | 1 | 0 | 1 | 0 | 2 | X | 5 |

| Sheet D | 1 | 2 | 3 | 4 | 5 | 6 | 7 | 8 | 9 | 10 | Final |
|---|---|---|---|---|---|---|---|---|---|---|---|
| (British Columbia) Kelly Scott | 1 | 0 | 0 | 0 | 1 | 1 | 0 | 2 | 0 | 0 | 5 |
| (Saskatchewan) Amber Holland 🔨 | 0 | 1 | 1 | 1 | 0 | 0 | 1 | 0 | 2 | 2 | 8 |

| Sheet E | 1 | 2 | 3 | 4 | 5 | 6 | 7 | 8 | 9 | 10 | Final |
|---|---|---|---|---|---|---|---|---|---|---|---|
| (Manitoba) Jennifer Jones | 0 | 0 | 1 | 0 | 0 | 1 | 0 | 0 | 0 | X | 2 |
| (Saskatchewan) Stefanie Lawton 🔨 | 0 | 2 | 0 | 2 | 0 | 0 | 1 | 1 | 1 | X | 7 |

==== Draw 6 ====
Thursday, December 2, 1:30 pm

| Sheet A | 1 | 2 | 3 | 4 | 5 | 6 | 7 | 8 | 9 | 10 | Final |
|---|---|---|---|---|---|---|---|---|---|---|---|
| (Newfoundland and Labrador) Shelley Nichols 🔨 | 1 | 0 | 1 | 0 | 0 | 1 | 0 | 1 | 0 | 0 | 4 |
| (Alberta) Cheryl Bernard | 0 | 2 | 0 | 0 | 1 | 0 | 1 | 0 | 2 | 1 | 7 |

| Sheet C | 1 | 2 | 3 | 4 | 5 | 6 | 7 | 8 | 9 | 10 | Final |
|---|---|---|---|---|---|---|---|---|---|---|---|
| (Alberta) Shannon Kleibrink 🔨 | 1 | 1 | 0 | 3 | 1 | 0 | 1 | 0 | 4 | X | 11 |
| (Saskatchewan) Stefanie Lawton | 0 | 0 | 2 | 0 | 0 | 2 | 0 | 1 | 0 | X | 5 |

==== Draw 7 ====
Thursday, December 2, 6:00 pm

| Sheet A | 1 | 2 | 3 | 4 | 5 | 6 | 7 | 8 | 9 | 10 | Final |
|---|---|---|---|---|---|---|---|---|---|---|---|
| (Manitoba) Jennifer Jones 🔨 | 4 | 0 | 1 | 0 | 0 | 6 | X | X | X | X | 11 |
| (Ontario) Krista McCarville | 0 | 2 | 0 | 1 | 0 | 0 | X | X | X | X | 3 |

| Sheet B | 1 | 2 | 3 | 4 | 5 | 6 | 7 | 8 | 9 | 10 | Final |
|---|---|---|---|---|---|---|---|---|---|---|---|
| (British Columbia) Kelly Scott 🔨 | 0 | 1 | 0 | 2 | 0 | 1 | 0 | 1 | 0 | 0 | 5 |
| (Alberta) Heather Nedohin | 0 | 0 | 2 | 0 | 1 | 0 | 1 | 0 | 0 | 2 | 6 |

==== Draw 8 ====
Friday, December 3, 9:00 am

| Sheet C | 1 | 2 | 3 | 4 | 5 | 6 | 7 | 8 | 9 | 10 | Final |
|---|---|---|---|---|---|---|---|---|---|---|---|
| (British Columbia) Kelly Scott 🔨 | 0 | 1 | 0 | 1 | 0 | 1 | 0 | 0 | 0 | 0 | 3 |
| (Ontario) Krista McCarville | 1 | 0 | 1 | 0 | 0 | 0 | 0 | 1 | 1 | 1 | 5 |

| Sheet D | 1 | 2 | 3 | 4 | 5 | 6 | 7 | 8 | 9 | 10 | Final |
|---|---|---|---|---|---|---|---|---|---|---|---|
| (Alberta) Shannon Kleibrink | 1 | 0 | 4 | 0 | 0 | 3 | 1 | 0 | 1 | X | 10 |
| (Newfoundland and Labrador) Shelley Nichols 🔨 | 0 | 1 | 0 | 1 | 1 | 0 | 0 | 3 | 0 | X | 6 |

| Sheet E | 1 | 2 | 3 | 4 | 5 | 6 | 7 | 8 | 9 | 10 | Final |
|---|---|---|---|---|---|---|---|---|---|---|---|
| (Alberta) Cheryl Bernard 🔨 | 0 | 1 | 3 | 0 | 2 | 0 | 2 | 0 | 1 | X | 9 |
| (Alberta) Heather Nedohin | 0 | 0 | 0 | 2 | 0 | 1 | 0 | 1 | 0 | X | 4 |

==== Draw 9 ====
Friday, December 3, 1:30 pm

| Sheet B | 1 | 2 | 3 | 4 | 5 | 6 | 7 | 8 | 9 | 10 | Final |
|---|---|---|---|---|---|---|---|---|---|---|---|
| (Alberta) Cheryl Bernard 🔨 | 0 | 2 | 1 | 1 | 0 | 3 | X | X | X | X | 7 |
| (Saskatchewan) Amber Holland | 0 | 0 | 0 | 0 | 1 | 0 | X | X | X | X | 1 |

| Sheet D | 1 | 2 | 3 | 4 | 5 | 6 | 7 | 8 | 9 | 10 | 11 | Final |
|---|---|---|---|---|---|---|---|---|---|---|---|---|
| (Saskatchewan) Stefanie Lawton 🔨 | 1 | 0 | 1 | 0 | 0 | 1 | 0 | 1 | 1 | 0 | 3 | 8 |
| (Manitoba) Chelsea Carey | 0 | 1 | 0 | 1 | 1 | 0 | 1 | 0 | 0 | 1 | 0 | 5 |

==== Draw 10 ====
Friday, December 3, 6:00 pm

| Sheet A | 1 | 2 | 3 | 4 | 5 | 6 | 7 | 8 | 9 | 10 | Final |
|---|---|---|---|---|---|---|---|---|---|---|---|
| (Saskatchewan) Amber Holland | 0 | 2 | 3 | 0 | 2 | 0 | 2 | 1 | 0 | 0 | 10 |
| (Manitoba) Chelsea Carey 🔨 | 4 | 0 | 0 | 2 | 0 | 3 | 0 | 0 | 1 | 1 | 11 |

| Sheet B | 1 | 2 | 3 | 4 | 5 | 6 | 7 | 8 | 9 | 10 | Final |
|---|---|---|---|---|---|---|---|---|---|---|---|
| (Alberta) Shannon Kleibrink 🔨 | 1 | 0 | 0 | 2 | 1 | 2 | 0 | 0 | 2 | 0 | 8 |
| (Manitoba) Jennifer Jones | 0 | 0 | 3 | 0 | 0 | 0 | 1 | 1 | 0 | 1 | 6 |

| Sheet D | 1 | 2 | 3 | 4 | 5 | 6 | 7 | 8 | 9 | 10 | Final |
|---|---|---|---|---|---|---|---|---|---|---|---|
| (Ontario) Krista McCarville | 1 | 0 | 1 | 0 | 2 | 0 | 0 | 3 | 0 | 0 | 7 |
| (Alberta) Heather Nedohin 🔨 | 0 | 1 | 0 | 1 | 0 | 1 | 2 | 0 | 2 | 3 | 10 |

=== Playoffs ===
Page playoff system
A1 | (Alberta) Shannon Kleibrink | 4
B1 | (Alberta) Cheryl Bernard | 6
A2 | (Saskatchewan) Stefanie Lawton | 9
B2 | (Ontario) Krista McCarville | 2

Semifinal
A1 | (Alberta) Shannon Kleibrink | 4
A2 | (Saskatchewan) Stefanie Lawton | 8

Final
B1 | (Alberta) Cheryl Bernard | 3
A2 | (Saskatchewan) Stefanie Lawton | 7

==== 1 vs. 2 ====
Saturday, December 4, 8:30 am

| Sheet A | 1 | 2 | 3 | 4 | 5 | 6 | 7 | 8 | 9 | 10 | Final |
|---|---|---|---|---|---|---|---|---|---|---|---|
| (Alberta) Cheryl Bernard | 1 | 0 | 2 | 0 | 1 | 1 | 0 | 0 | 0 | 1 | 6 |
| (Alberta) Shannon Kleibrink 🔨 | 0 | 3 | 0 | 0 | 0 | 0 | 0 | 1 | 0 | 0 | 4 |

==== 3 vs. 4 ====
Saturday, December 4, 8:30 am

| Sheet E | 1 | 2 | 3 | 4 | 5 | 6 | 7 | 8 | 9 | 10 | Final |
|---|---|---|---|---|---|---|---|---|---|---|---|
| (Ontario) Krista McCarville | 0 | 0 | 0 | 0 | 1 | 0 | 1 | 0 | X | X | 2 |
| (Saskatchewan) Stefanie Lawton 🔨 | 1 | 1 | 1 | 1 | 0 | 2 | 0 | 3 | X | X | 9 |

==== Semifinal ====
Saturday, December 4, 1:30 pm

| Sheet C | 1 | 2 | 3 | 4 | 5 | 6 | 7 | 8 | 9 | 10 | Final |
|---|---|---|---|---|---|---|---|---|---|---|---|
| (Alberta) Shannon Kleibrink 🔨 | 0 | 0 | 2 | 0 | 1 | 0 | 0 | 1 | 0 | X | 4 |
| (Saskatchewan) Stefanie Lawton | 1 | 2 | 0 | 2 | 0 | 2 | 1 | 0 | 0 | X | 8 |

==== Final ====
Sunday, December 5, 11:00 am

| Sheet D | 1 | 2 | 3 | 4 | 5 | 6 | 7 | 8 | 9 | 10 | Final |
|---|---|---|---|---|---|---|---|---|---|---|---|
| (Alberta) Cheryl Bernard 🔨 | 0 | 1 | 0 | 0 | 1 | 0 | 0 | 1 | 0 | X | 3 |
| (Saskatchewan) Stefanie Lawton | 0 | 0 | 1 | 1 | 0 | 1 | 3 | 0 | 1 | X | 7 |
