= 2009 Boston Pizza Cup =

Men's curling championship in Alberta, Canada

- Host city: Wainwright, Alberta
- Arena: Wainwright Arena
- Dates: February 11-15
- Winner: Kevin Martin
- Curling club: Saville Sports Centre, Edmonton
- Skip: Kevin Martin
- Third: John Morris
- Second: Marc Kennedy
- Lead: Ben Hebert
- Finalist: Randy Ferbey

The 2009 Boston Pizza Cup (the Alberta men's curling championship) was held February 11-15 at the Wainwright Arena in Wainwright. Defending champion Kevin Martin won again. As winner, Martin represented Alberta and won the 2009 Tim Hortons Brier.

== Teams ==
Skip	Third	Second	Lead	Club
Ted Appelman	Tom Appelman	Brandon Klassen	Brendan Melnyk	Saville Sports Centre, Edmonton
Rob Armitage	Shaun Meachem	Trevor Sparks	Steven Matejka	Red Deer Curling Club, Red Deer
Kurt Balderston	Rob Bucholz	Geoff Walker	Del Shaughnessy	Sexsmith Curling Club, Sexsmith
Randy Ferbey*	Dave Nedohin	Scott Pfeifer	Marcel Rocque	Saville Sports Centre, Edmonton
Jeff Ginter	Len Holland	Kevin Turner	Mark Heartt	Dawson Creek Curling Club, Dawson Creek
Mike Hutchings	Kevin Skarban	Brian McPherson	Derek Skarban	Saville Sports Centre, Edmonton
Jamie King	Blayne Iskiw	Glen Kennedy	Todd Brick	Saville Sports Centre, Edmonton
Kevin Koe*	Blake MacDonald	Carter Rycroft	Nolan Thiessen	Saville Sports Centre, Edmonton
Kevin Martin	John Morris	Marc Kennedy	Ben Hebert	Saville Sports Centre, Edmonton
James Pahl	Mark Klinck	Roland Robinson	Don Bartlett	Sherwood Park Curling Club, Sherwood Park
Steve Petryk	Rob Schlendek	Brent Bawel	Sean O'Connor	Calgary Curling Club, Calgary
Dean Ross	Greg Northcott	Chris Blackwell	Aaron Westgard	Calgary Curling Club, Calgary

* Throws third rocks; thirds throw skip rocks

== Draw Brackets ==
=== A Event ===
Round of 16
James Pahl	6
Dean Ross	7
Jamie King	8
Mike Hutchings	6
Steve Petryk	5
Jeff Ginter	4
Kurt Balderston	6
Rob Armitage	3

Quarterfinals
Kevin Martin	4
Dean Ross	2
Ted Appelman	4
Jamie King	7
Kevin Koe	9
Steve Petryk	3
Randy Ferbey	7
Kurt Balderston	4

Semifinals
Kevin Martin	8
Jamie King	2
Kevin Koe	2
Randy Ferbey	6

A Qualifier
Kevin Martin	8
Randy Ferbey	5

=== B Event ===
Round of 16
James Pahl	8
Ted Appelman	6
Steve Petryk	7
Mike Hutchings	13
Jeff Ginter	2
Kurt Balderston	6
Rob Armitage	5
Dean Ross	7

Quarterfinals
James Pahl	5
Kevin Koe	6
Mike Hutchings	8
Jamie King	9
Kurt Balderston	5
Dean Ross	9

Semifinals
Kevin Koe	8
Jamie King	5
Dean Ross	3
Randy Ferbey	10

B Qualifier
Kevin Koe	5
Randy Ferbey	9

=== C Event ===
Quarterfinals		Semifinals		C Qualifier
		Dean Ross	3
Ted Appelman	8	Ted Appelman	10
Steve Petryk	5			Ted Appelman	5
				Kurt Balderston	8
		Kurt Balderston	9
		Jamie King	6

Quarterfinals		Semifinals		C Qualifier
Jeff Ginter	2
James Pahl	9	James Pahl	9
Rob Armitage	9	Rob Armitage	3
Mike Hutchings	4			James Pahl	9
				Kevin Koe	7

== Results ==
=== Draw 1 ===
February 11, 1300

Team	1	2	3	4	5	6	7	8	9	10	Final
Dean Ross	0	0	1	2	0	2	0	2	0	0	7
James Pahl	0	1	0	0	1	0	2	0	1	1	6

Team	1	2	3	4	5	6	7	8	9	10	Final
Jamie King	1	0	2	1	0	0	3	0	1	X	8
Mike Hutchings	0	3	0	0	1	0	0	2	0	X	6

Team	1	2	3	4	5	6	7	8	9	10	Final
Steve Petryk	0	1	1	0	0	0	0	0	3	0	5
Jeff Ginter	0	0	0	2	1	0	0	0	0	1	4

Team	1	2	3	4	5	6	7	8	9	10	Final
Kurt Balderston	1	0	0	0	2	0	0	0	3	X	6
Rob Armitage	0	0	1	1	0	0	0	1	0	X	3

=== Draw 2 ===
February 11, 1830

Team	1	2	3	4	5	6	7	8	9	10	Final
Dean Ross	0	0	0	0	1	0	0	1	0	0	2
Kevin Martin	0	2	0	0	0	1	0	0	0	1	4

Team	1	2	3	4	5	6	7	8	9	10	Final
Ted Appelman	0	0	1	0	1	1	0	1	0	X	4
Jamie King	0	1	0	4	0	0	1	0	1	X	7

Team	1	2	3	4	5	6	7	8	9	10	Final
Steve Petryk	0	2	0	0	1	0	0	0	X	X	3
Kevin Koe	2	0	2	0	0	1	1	3	X	X	9

Team	1	2	3	4	5	6	7	8	9	10	Final
Randy Ferbey	0	0	0	0	2	1	2	1	0	1	7
Kurt Balderston	1	2	0	0	0	0	0	0	1	0	4

=== Draw 3 ===
February 12, 0830

Team	1	2	3	4	5	6	7	8	9	10	Final
Kevin Martin	3	0	2	0	0	2	0	1	X	X	8
Jamie King	0	0	0	0	2	0	0	0	X	X	2

Team	1	2	3	4	5	6	7	8	9	10	Final
Kevin Koe	0	0	0	0	0	2	X	X	X	X	2
Randy Ferbey	1	1	3	1	0	0	X	X	X	X	6

=== Draw 4 ===
February 12, 1330

Team	1	2	3	4	5	6	7	8	9	10	Final
Ted Appelman	0	2	0	1	0	0	2	0	1	0	6
James Pahl	2	0	1	0	2	0	0	1	0	2	8

Team	1	2	3	4	5	6	7	8	9	10	Final
Steve Petryk	0	1	0	3	0	0	3	0	0	X	7
Mike Hutchings	1	0	2	0	1	5	0	1	3	X	13

Team	1	2	3	4	5	6	7	8	9	10	Final
Kurt Balderston	0	0	2	1	0	0	0	3	X	X	6
Jeff Ginter	0	0	0	0	0	1	1	0	X	X	2

Team	1	2	3	4	5	6	7	8	9	10	Final
Rob Armitage	3	0	0	1	0	0	0	1	0	0	5
Dean Ross	0	1	1	0	1	0	2	0	1	1	7

=== Draw 5 ===
February 12, 1830

Team	1	2	3	4	5	6	7	8	9	10	Final
Kevin Martin	0	0	2	0	1	0	2	2	1	X	8
Randy Ferbey	2	0	0	2	0	1	0	0	0	X	5

Team	1	2	3	4	5	6	7	8	9	10	Final
James Pahl	1	0	2	0	1	0	0	0	1	0	5
Kevin Koe	0	1	0	2	0	2	0	0	0	1	6

Team	1	2	3	4	5	6	7	8	9	10	Final
Jamie King	1	0	1	0	2	0	1	3	0	1	9
Mike Hutchings	0	2	0	2	0	2	0	0	2	0	8

Team	1	2	3	4	5	6	7	8	9	10	Final
Dean Ross	0	0	0	2	1	0	5	0	1	X	9
Kurt Balderston	1	0	0	0	0	2	0	2	0	X	5

=== Draw 6 ===
February 13, 0830

Team	1	2	3	4	5	6	7	8	9	10	Final
Steve Petryk	0	1	0	1	1	0	0	0	2	0	5
Ted Appelman	1	0	1	0	0	2	0	3	0	1	8

Team	1	2	3	4	5	6	7	8	9	10	Final
Jeff Ginter	0	0	1	0	0	1	0	X	X	X	2
James Pahl	0	1	0	3	2	0	3	X	X	X	9

Team	1	2	3	4	5	6	7	8	9	10	Final
Rob Armitage	0	0	5	0	0	3	1	X	X	X	9
Mike Hutchings	0	1	0	3	0	0	0	X	X	X	4

=== Draw 7 ===
February 13, 1330

Team	1	2	3	4	5	6	7	8	9	10	Final
Jamie King	0	1	0	0	3	0	0	1	0	X	5
Kevin Koe	1	0	0	2	0	0	2	0	3	X	8

Team	1	2	3	4	5	6	7	8	9	10	Final
Dean Ross	0	1	0	0	1	1	0	0	X	X	3
Randy Ferbey	2	0	0	2	0	0	4	2	X	X	10

=== Draw 8 ===
February 13, 1830

Team	1	2	3	4	5	6	7	8	9	10	Final
Kevin Koe	0	1	0	0	0	2	0	2	0	X	5
Randy Ferbey	1	0	2	1	1	0	2	0	2	X	9

Team	1	2	3	4	5	6	7	8	9	10	Final
Ted Appelman	1	0	0	4	0	3	2	X	X	X	10
Dean Ross	0	0	1	0	2	0	0	X	X	X	3

Team	1	2	3	4	5	6	7	8	9	10	Final
Kurt Balderston	0	2	0	1	0	4	0	1	0	1	9
Jamie King	0	0	1	0	1	0	2	0	2	0	6

Team	1	2	3	4	5	6	7	8	9	10	Final
Rob Armitage	1	0	0	0	2	0	X	X	X	X	3
James Pahl	0	0	3	2	0	4	X	X	X	X	9

=== Draw 9 ===
February 14, 1300

Team	1	2	3	4	5	6	7	8	9	10	Final
Kurt Balderston	0	1	0	0	3	2	0	0	0	2	8
Ted Appelman	2	0	1	1	0	0	1	0	0	0	5

Team	1	2	3	4	5	6	7	8	9	10	11	Final
James Pahl	0	1	1	0	1	0	2	0	2	0	2	9
Kevin Koe	2	0	0	1	0	1	0	2	0	1	0	7

== Playoffs ==
Page playoff system
A	Kevin Martin	6
B	Randy Ferbey	5
C1	Kurt Balderston	4
C2	James Pahl	5

Semifinal
B	Randy Ferbey	7
C2	James Pahl	6

Final
A	Kevin Martin	7
B	Randy Ferbey	3

=== C1 vs. C2 ===
February 14, 1830

Team	1	2	3	4	5	6	7	8	9	10	Final
James Pahl	0	0	1	0	1	1	0	0	0	2	5
Kurt Balderston	1	0	0	0	0	0	1	1	1	0	4

=== A vs. B ===
February 14, 1830

Team	1	2	3	4	5	6	7	8	9	10	Final
Kevin Martin	0	0	2	0	1	0	1	2	0	X	6
Randy Ferbey	0	1	0	2	0	1	0	0	1	X	5

=== Semi-final ===
February 15, 0930

Team	1	2	3	4	5	6	7	8	9	10	Final
James Pahl	0	1	0	2	0	0	1	0	2	0	6
Randy Ferbey	1	0	1	0	0	1	0	3	0	1	7

=== Final ===
February 15, 1400

Team	1	2	3	4	5	6	7	8	9	10	Final
Kevin Martin	2	0	2	0	0	2	1	0	X	X	7
Randy Ferbey	0	0	0	0	1	0	0	2	X	X	3

== Qualification ==
Three teams qualify from Southern Alberta, three from Northern Alberta and two from the Peace Region. In addition, four teams have automatically qualified based on other reasons. Defending World Champion Kevin Martin qualifies as defending champion, plus Kevin Koe as the top remaining Albertan team in the CCA rankings from last season. In addition the top two teams remaining teams on the Alberta Curling Tour receive spots, that being Ted Appelman's team and Randy Ferbey's team.
