= 2012 Cactus Pheasant Classic =

- Host city: Brooks, Alberta
- Arena: Brooks Curling Club
- Dates: October 25–28
- Winner: (Alberta) Kevin Koe
- Curling club: Glencoe CC, Calgary
- Skip: Kevin Koe
- Third: Pat Simmons
- Second: Carter Rycroft
- Lead: Nolan Thiessen
- Finalist: (Manitoba) Mike McEwen

The 2012 Cactus Pheasant Classic was held from October 25 to 28 at the Brooks Curling Club in Brooks, Alberta as part of the 2012–13 World Curling Tour. The event was held in a triple knockout format, and the purse for the event was CAD$70,000. In the final, Kevin Koe defeated Mike McEwen with a score of 6–5.

== Teams ==
The teams are listed as follows:

Skip	Third	Second	Lead	Locale
Tom Appelman	Brent Bawel	Ted Appelman	Brendan Melnyk	Edmonton, Alberta
Scott Bitz	Jeff Sharp	Aryn Schmidt	Dean Hicke	Regina, Saskatchewan
Tom Brewster	Greg Drummond	Scott Andrews	Michael Goodfellow	Aberdeen, Scotland
Jim Cotter	Jason Gunnlaugson	Tyrel Griffith	Rick Sawatsky	Kelowna/Vernon, British Columbia
Niklas Edin	Sebastian Kraupp	Fredrik Lindberg	Viktor Kjäll	Karlstad, Sweden
Scott Egger	Albert Gerdung	Darren Grierson	Robin Niebergall	Brooks, Alberta
Rob Fowler	Allan Lyburn	Richard Daneault	Derek Samagalski	Brandon, Manitoba
Glenn Howard	Wayne Middaugh	Brent Laing	Craig Savill	Coldwater, Ontario
Glen Kennedy	Nathan Connolly	Brandon Klassen	Parker Konschuh	Edmonton, Alberta
Kim Chang-min	Kim Min-chan	Seong Se-hyeon	Seon Se-young	Uiseong, Gyeongbuk, South Korea
Steve Laycock	Kirk Muyres	Colton Flasch	Dallan Muyres	Saskatoon, Saskatchewan
Liu Rui	Xu Xiaoming	Zang Jialiang	Ba Dexin	Harbin, China
William Lyburn	James Kirkness	Alex Forrest	Tyler Forrest	Winnipeg, Manitoba
Kevin Martin	John Morris	Marc Kennedy	Ben Hebert	Edmonton, Alberta
Mike McEwen	B.J. Neufeld	Matt Wozniak	Denni Neufeld	Winnipeg, Manitoba
David Nedohin	Colin Hodgson	Tom Sallows	Mike Westlund	Edmonton, Alberta
Dan Petryk (fourth)	Steve Petryk (skip)	Roland Robinson	Thomas Usselman	Calgary, Alberta
Brent Pierce	Jeff Richard	Kevin Recksiedler	Grant Dezura	New Westminster, British Columbia
Robert Schlender	Dean Ross	Don Bartlett	Chris Lemishka	Edmonton, Alberta
Jeff Stoughton	Jon Mead	Reid Carruthers	Mark Nichols	Winnipeg, Manitoba
Charley Thomas	J. D. Lind	Dominic Daemen	Matthew Ng	Calgary, Alberta
Thomas Ulsrud	Torger Nergård	Christoffer Svae	Håvard Vad Petersson	Oslo, Norway
Brock Virtue	Braeden Moskowy	Chris Schille	D. J Kidby	Regina, Saskatchewan

== Knockout results ==
The draw is listed as follows:

=== A event ===
First Knockout		Semifinals		Qualifier 1
(Ontario) Glenn Howard	6
(Alberta) Scott Egger	3	(Ontario) Glenn Howard	6
(Manitoba) William Lyburn	3	(China) Liu Rui	5
(China) Liu Rui	4			(Ontario) Glenn Howard	6
(Manitoba) Jeff Stoughton	6			(Manitoba) Jeff Stoughton	5
(Alberta) David Nedohin	1	(Manitoba) Jeff Stoughton	8
(Norway) Thomas Ulsrud	7	(Norway) Thomas Ulsrud	2
(Alberta) Robert Schlender	2

First Knockout		Semifinals		Qualifier 2
(Manitoba) Mike McEwen	6
(South Korea) Kim Chang-min	1	(Manitoba) Mike McEwen	8
(Alberta) Charley Thomas	7	(Alberta) Charley Thomas	1
(Saskatchewan) Steve Laycock	5			(Manitoba) Mike McEwen	3
(Alberta) Kevin Koe	5			(Alberta) Kevin Koe	7
(Saskatchewan) Scott Bitz	3	(Alberta) Kevin Koe	7
(Scotland) Tom Brewster	2	(Alberta) Tom Appelman	1
(Alberta) Tom Appelman	8

First Knockout		Semifinals		Qualifier 3
(Alberta) Kevin Martin	8
(Alberta) Glen Kennedy	5	(Alberta) Kevin Martin	6
(British Columbia) Jim Cotter	6	(British Columbia) Jim Cotter	5
(British Columbia) Brent Pierce	1			(Alberta) Kevin Martin	6
(Sweden) Niklas Edin	7			(Manitoba) Rob Fowler	1
(Saskatchewan) Brock Virtue	2	(Sweden) Niklas Edin	5
(Manitoba) Rob Fowler	5	(Manitoba) Rob Fowler	6
(Alberta) Steve Petryk	4

=== B event ===
Second Knockout
(Alberta) Scott Egger	8
(Manitoba) William Lyburn	6
(Alberta) David Nedohin	6
(Alberta) Robert Schlender	7

Quarterfinals
(British Columbia) Jim Cotter	7
(Alberta) Scott Egger	6
(Sweden) Niklas Edin	7
(Alberta) Robert Schlender	2

Semifinals
(British Columbia) Jim Cotter	4
(Sweden) Niklas Edin	6

Qualifier 4
(Sweden) Niklas Edin	4
(Manitoba) Mike McEwen	6

Second Knockout
(South Korea) Kim Chang-min	3
(Saskatchewan) Steve Laycock	7
(Saskatchewan) Scott Bitz	7
(Scotland) Tom Brewster	8

Quarterfinals
(China) Liu Rui	5
(Saskatchewan) Steve Laycock	6
(Norway) Thomas Ulsrud	6
(Scotland) Tom Brewster	5

Semifinals
(Saskatchewan) Steve Laycock	7
(Norway) Thomas Ulsrud	3

Qualifier 5
(Saskatchewan) Steve Laycock	2
(Manitoba) Rob Fowler	8

Second Knockout
(Alberta) Glen Kennedy	7
(British Columbia) Brent Pierce	10
(Saskatchewan) Brock Virtue	5
(Alberta) Steve Petryk	6

Quarterfinals
(Alberta) Charley Thomas	6
(British Columbia) Brent Pierce	7
(Alberta) Tom Appelman	7
(Alberta) Steve Petryk	3

Semifinals
(British Columbia) Brent Pierce	6
(Alberta) Tom Appelman	4

Qualifier 6
(British Columbia) Brent Pierce	6
(Manitoba) Jeff Stoughton	9

=== C event ===
Third Knockout
(China) Liu Rui	6
(Scotland) Tom Brewster	5
(Alberta) Charley Thomas	4
(Alberta) Steve Petryk	5

Quarterfinals
(Alberta) Scott Egger	7
(Alberta) Robert Schlender	5
(China) Liu Rui	6
(Alberta) Tom Appelman	2
(British Columbia) Jim Cotter	5
(Alberta) Steve Petryk	4

Semifinals
(Alberta) Scott Egger	6
(China) Liu Rui	5
(British Columbia) Jim Cotter	4
(Saskatchewan) Steve Laycock	8

Qualifier 7
(Alberta) Scott Egger	4
(Saskatchewan) Steve Laycock	7

Third Knockout
(Manitoba) William Lyburn	6
(Alberta) David Nedohin	4
(South Korea) Kim Chang-min	5
(Saskatchewan) Scott Bitz	6
(Alberta) Glen Kennedy	2
(Saskatchewan) Brock Virtue	6

Quarterfinals
(Manitoba) William Lyburn	5
(Norway) Thomas Ulsrud	6
(Saskatchewan) Scott Bitz	6
(Saskatchewan) Brock Virtue	5

Semifinals
(British Columbia) Brent Pierce	6
(Norway) Thomas Ulsrud	4
(Sweden) Niklas Edin	5
(Saskatchewan) Scott Bitz	4

Qualifier 8
(British Columbia) Brent Pierce	6
(Sweden) Niklas Edin	5

== Playoffs ==
The playoffs draw is listed as follows:

Quarterfinals
(Ontario) Glenn Howard	4
(British Columbia) Brent Pierce	3
(Manitoba) Mike McEwen	5
(Manitoba) Rob Fowler	2
(Alberta) Kevin Koe	5
(Saskatchewan) Steve Laycock	3
(Alberta) Kevin Martin	8
(Manitoba) Jeff Stoughton	1

Semifinals
(Ontario) Glenn Howard	2
(Manitoba) Mike McEwen	6
(Alberta) Kevin Koe	5
(Alberta) Kevin Martin	4

Final
(Manitoba) Mike McEwen	5
(Alberta) Kevin Koe	6
