= Cactus Pheasant Classic =

Former World Curling Tour event in Canada

The Cactus Pheasant Classic was an annual curling tournament, held in late October in Brooks, Alberta. It was part of the World Curling Tour. The purse for the event was $70,000 Cdn. It has not been held since 2013.

== Past champions ==
Only skip's name is displayed.

Year	Winning skip	Runner-up skip	Purse (CAD)
2007	(Alberta) Kevin Martin	(Ontario) Wayne Middaugh	$70,000
2008	(Ontario) Glenn Howard	(Alberta) Kevin Martin	$70,000
2009	(Ontario) Glenn Howard	(Alberta) Kevin Martin	$70,000
2010	(Alberta) Kevin Martin	(Ontario) Wayne Middaugh	$70,000
2011	(Manitoba) Mike McEwen	(Alberta) Randy Ferbey	$70,000
2012	(Alberta) Kevin Koe	(Manitoba) Mike McEwen	$70,000
2013	(Manitoba) Mike McEwen	(Switzerland) Sven Michel	$70,000
