= 1982 Canadian Junior Men's Curling Championship =

- Host city: Swift Current, Saskatchewan
- Arena: Stockade
- Dates: February 21–27
- Winner: Ontario
- Curling club: Mississaugua Golf & Country Club, Mississauga
- Skip: John Base
- Third: Bruce Webster
- Second: Dave McAnerney
- Lead: Jim Donahoe
- Finalist: British Columbia (Todd Gray)

The 1982 Pepsi Canadian Junior Men's Curling Championship was held February 21 to 27 at the Stockade in Swift Current, Saskatchewan.

In the final, Ontario's John Base defeated British Columbia's Todd Gray rink, 4–3. BC was in the driver's seat having taken a 3–1 lead after eight, thanks to a two great shots by Gray, a hit and roll behind a guard on hist first, and a draw on his last. In the ninth end however, Gray was narrow on his last rock, allowing Base to draw through a port to score two, and tie the game in the third. In the tenth, Base drew to the four foot behind cover to sit one. Gray responded by throwing his draw through the house, giving up the steal and handing the Canadian Junior crown to Base and his Ontario team. Both Ontario and BC had identical 9–2 records after the round robin, but Ontario earned a bye to the final thanks to defeating BC in their round robin match.

== Teams ==
The teams were as follows:

Province / Territory	Skip	Third	Second	Lead	Locale
Alberta	Steve Petryk	David Zabolotniuk	Lyle Horneland	Denis Krysalka	Edmonton
British Columbia	Todd Gray	Mike Slattery	Greg Kastes	Doug Portfors (Note: Portfors was replaced by Swift Current resident Kelly Fortman for the remainder of the tournament when Portfors was rushed to the hospital on February 23 due to a surprise diabetes diagnosis.)	North Vancouver
Manitoba	Eric Montford	Alan Kinnaird	Mike Friesen	Milhau Gagne	Winnipeg
New Brunswick	Mark Gaudet	Roger Nason	Ken Cripps	Jerome Bear	Fredericton
Newfoundland	Lorne Henderson	Paul Harvey	Marc Brophy	Jeff Hodder	St. John's
Northern Ontario	Bill Adams	Scott Henderson (skip)	Jim Adams	Brad Coulson	Thunder Bay
Nova Scotia	Kent Saunders	Michael Myra	Todd Mayo	Stephen Rhodenizer	Lunenburg
Ontario	John Base	Bruce Webster	Dave McAnerney	Jim Donahoe	Mississauga
Prince Edward Island	Wade MacRae	Paul Dillon	Mike Dillon	Roy Whitlock	Charlottetown
Quebec	Larry Phillips	Francois Thibault	Jean-Marc Beaudet	Luc Boisvert	Trois-Rivières
Saskatchewan	Doug Marks	Craig Koch	Tracy Leader	Scott Mazinke	Regina
Northwest Territories/Yukon	Trev McIlwaine	Dave Pearson	Wayne Zigarlick	Don Costucci	Pine Point

== Round robin standings ==
Final standings

Key
Teams to Playoffs

Team	Skip	W	L
Ontario	John Base	9	2
British Columbia	Todd Gray	9	2
Manitoba	Eric Montford	8	3
Northern Ontario	Bill Adams	7	4
Newfoundland	Lorne Henderson	7	4
Quebec	Larry Phillips	5	6
Saskatchewan	Doug Marks	5	6
Nova Scotia	Kent Saunders	4	7
Alberta	Steve Petryk	4	7
Prince Edward Island	Wade MacRae	4	7
New Brunswick	Mark Gaudet	3	8
Northwest Territories/Yukon	Trev McIlwaine	1	10

== Playoffs ==
Semifinal			Final
			1	Ontario	4
2	British Columbia	6	2	British Columbia	3
3	Manitoba	3

=== Semifinal ===
February 26

Team	1	2	3	4	5	6	7	8	9	10	Final
British Columbia (Gray)	0	1	0	0	1	0	3	0	1	X	6
Manitoba (Montford)	0	0	1	0	0	2	0	0	0	X	3

=== Final ===
February 27

Team	1	2	3	4	5	6	7	8	9	10	Final
British Columbia (Gray)	0	0	0	0	1	0	0	2	0	0	3
Ontario (Base)	0	0	0	0	0	1	0	0	2	1	4
