= 2013 Cactus Pheasant Classic =

World Curling Tour event

- Host city: Brooks, Alberta
- Arena: Brooks Curling Club
- Dates: October 24–27
- Winner: (Manitoba) Mike McEwen
- Curling club: Fort Rouge Curling Club, Winnipeg, Manitoba
- Skip: Mike McEwen
- Third: B. J. Neufeld
- Second: Matt Wozniak
- Lead: Denni Neufeld
- Finalist: (Switzerland) Sven Michel

The 2013 Cactus Pheasant Classic was held from October 24 to 27 at the Brooks Curling Club in Brooks, Alberta as part of the 2013–14 World Curling Tour. The event was in a triple knockout format, and the purse for the event was CAD$70,000.

Winnipeg's Mike McEwen defeated Switzerland's Sven Michel in the final.

== Teams ==
The teams are listed as follows:

Skip	Third	Second	Lead	Locale
Tom Appelman	Nathan Connolly	Brandon Klassen	Parker Konschuh	Edmonton, Alberta
Andrew Bilesky	Stephen Kopf	Derek Errington	Aaron Watson	New Westminster, British Columbia
Brendan Bottcher	Micky Lizmore	Bradley Thiessen	Karrick Martin	Edmonton, Alberta
Brady Clark	Sean Beighton	Darren Lehto	Phil Tilker	(Washington (state)) Lynnwood, Washington
Niklas Edin	Sebastian Kraupp	Fredrik Lindberg	Viktor Kjäll	Karlstad, Sweden
Oskar Eriksson	Kristian Lindström	Markus Eriksson	Christoffer Sundgren	Lit, Sweden
Patric Mabergs (fourth)	Gustav Eskilsson (skip)	Jesper Johansson	Johannes Patz	Skellefteå, Sweden
Lloyd Hill	Scott Egger	Greg Hill	Maurice Sonier	Calgary, Alberta
Kim Chang-min	Kim Min-chan	Seong Se-hyeon	Seo Young-seon	Uiseong, South Korea
Kevin Koe	Pat Simmons	Carter Rycroft	Nolan Thiessen	Calgary, Alberta
Steve Laycock	Kirk Muyres	Colton Flasch	Dallan Muyres	Saskatoon, Saskatchewan
Liu Rui	Zang Jialiang	Xu Xiaoming	Ba Dexin	Harbin, China
Kevin Martin	David Nedohin	Marc Kennedy	Ben Hebert	Edmonton, Alberta
Mike McEwen	B. J. Neufeld	Matt Wozniak	Denni Neufeld	Winnipeg, Manitoba
Sven Michel	Claudio Pätz	Sandro Trolliet	Simon Gempeler	Adelboden, Switzerland
Jim Cotter (fourth)	John Morris (skip)	Tyrel Griffith	Rick Sawatsky	Vernon, British Columbia
David Murdoch	Tom Brewster	Greg Drummond	Michael Goodfellow	Stirling, Scotland
Shane Park	Tony Germsheid	Aaron Sarafinchan	Phil Hemming	Edmonton, Alberta
Sean Geall (fourth)	Brent Pierce (skip)	Sebastien Robillard	Mark Olson	New Westminster, British Columbia
Robert Schlender	Aaron Sluchinski	Justin Sluchinski	Dylan Webster	Airdrie, Alberta
Thomas Ulsrud	Torger Nergård	Christoffer Svae	Håvard Vad Petersson	Oslo, Norway

== Playoffs ==
Quarterfinals
(Switzerland) Sven Michel	6
(Alberta) Kevin Koe	4
(Sweden) Niklas Edin	1
(Norway) Thomas Ulsrud	7
(Saskatchewan) Steve Laycock	6
(Alberta) Kevin Martin	8
(Manitoba) Mike McEwen	5
(Manitoba) Rob Fowler	3

Semifinals
(Switzerland) Sven Michel	5
(Norway) Thomas Ulsrud	3
(Alberta) Kevin Martin	1
(Manitoba) Mike McEwen	8

Final
(Switzerland) Sven Michel	0
(Manitoba) Mike McEwen	8
