= 2010 The National (December) =

Grand Slam of Curling event

The Swiss Chalet National 2010
- Host city: Vernon, British Columbia
- Arena: Wesbild Centre
- Dates: December 15–19
- Winner: (Alberta) Team Martin
- Curling club: Saville Sports Centre, Edmonton
- Skip: Kevin Martin
- Third: John Morris
- Second: Marc Kennedy
- Lead: Ben Hebert
- Finalist: (Manitoba) Team Stoughton

The Swiss Chalet National was held from December 15 to 19, 2010 at the Wesbild Centre in Vernon, British Columbia. 18 men's teams were playing for 8 quarterfinal spots in a round-robin format. The purse for this event was CAD$100,000.

The event was the second men's Grand Slam event of the 2010-11 curling season.

== Teams ==
Skip	Third	Second	Lead	Locale
Ted Appelman	Tom Appelman	Brandon Klassen	Brendan Melnyk	(Alberta) Edmonton
Brent Bawel	Sean O'Connor	Mike Jantzen	Hardi Sulimma	(Alberta) Calgary
Niklas Edin	Sebastian Kraupp	Fredrik Lindberg	Viktor Kjäll	(Sweden) Karlstad
John Epping	Scott Bailey	Darryl Prebble	Trevor Wall	(Ontario) Toronto
Brad Gushue	Randy Ferbey (skip)	Mark Nichols	Ryan Fry	(Newfoundland and Labrador) St. John's
Martin Ferland	François Roberge	Shawn Fowler	Maxime Elmaleh	(Quebec) Trois-Rivières
Sean Geall	Grant Dezura	Kevin Recksiedler	Kevin MacKenzie	(British Columbia) New Westminster
Glenn Howard	Richard Hart	Brent Laing	Craig Savill	(Ontario) Coldwater
Kevin Koe	Blake MacDonald	Carter Rycroft	Nolan Thiessen	(Alberta) Edmonton
Kevin Martin	John Morris	Marc Kennedy	Ben Hebert	(Alberta) Edmonton
Mike McEwen	B. J. Neufeld	Matt Wozniak	Denni Neufeld	(Manitoba) Winnipeg
Wayne Middaugh	Joe Frans	Scott Howard	Scott Foster	(Ontario) Toronto
Jason Montgomery	Mike Wood	Miles Craig	William Duggan	(British Columbia) Duncan
Kevin Park	Chris Galbraith	Taren Gesell	Pat McCallum	(Manitoba) Winnipeg
Pat Simmons	Steve Laycock	Brennen Jones	Dallan Muyres	(Saskatchewan) Regina
Jeff Stoughton	Jon Mead	Reid Carruthers	Steve Gould	(Manitoba) Winnipeg
Jim Cotter (Note: Skip Bob Ursel was injured, but the team was still referred to as Team Bob Ursel.)	Ken Maskiewich	Kevin Folk	Rick Sawatsky	(British Columbia) Kelowna
Don Walchuk	Chris Schille	D. J. Kidby	Don Bartlett	(Alberta) Edmonton

== Round robin ==
=== Standings ===
Key
Teams to Playoffs

Pool A	W	L	PF	PA
(Sweden) Niklas Edin	5	0	35	12
(Manitoba) Jeff Stoughton	4	1	25	18
(Alberta) Kevin Martin	3	2	22	20
(British Columbia) Jason Montgomery	2	3	20	21
(Alberta) Ted Appelman	1	4	17	29
(Manitoba) Kevin Park	0	5	16	24

Pool B	W	L	PF	PA
(Manitoba) Mike McEwen	5	0	34	22
(Ontario) Glenn Howard	3	2	28	22
(British Columbia) Bob Ursel	3	2	29	21
(British Columbia) Sean Geall	2	3	19	27
(Ontario) John Epping	2	3	28	31
(Quebec) Martin Ferland	0	5	21	36

Pool C	W	L	PF	PA
(Ontario) Wayne Middaugh	4	1	27	22
(Alberta) Don Walchuk	4	1	36	18
(Newfoundland and Labrador) Randy Ferbey	2	3	24	25
(Alberta) Kevin Koe	2	3	21	26
(Saskatchewan) Pat Simmons	2	3	19	23
(Alberta) Brent Bawel	1	4	22	31

=== Results ===
==== Draw 1 ====
Wednesday, December 15, 7:30 pm

Sheet A	1	2	3	4	5	6	7	8	9	Final
(Alberta) Kevin Martin	1	1	0	2	0	0	0	0	1	5
(Alberta) Ted Appelman	0	0	1	0	1	0	1	1	0	4

Sheet B	1	2	3	4	5	6	7	8	Final
(Saskatchewan) Pat Simmons	0	1	0	0	1	0	X	X	2
(Newfoundland and Labrador) Randy Ferbey	3	0	2	1	0	1	X	X	7

Sheet C	1	2	3	4	5	6	7	8	Final
(Sweden) Niklas Edin	2	0	2	3	0	1	1	X	7
(Manitoba) Kevin Park	0	1	0	0	2	0	0	X	3

Sheet D	1	2	3	4	5	6	7	8	Final
(Manitoba) Mike McEwen	1	0	1	0	3	0	0	1	6
(British Columbia) Bob Ursel	0	1	0	1	0	2	1	0	5

Sheet E	1	2	3	4	5	6	7	8	Final
(Alberta) Kevin Koe	0	0	1	2	0	1	1	0	5
(Alberta) Brent Bawel	2	1	0	0	3	0	0	1	7

==== Draw 2 ====
Thursday, December 16, 10:00 am

Sheet A	1	2	3	4	5	6	7	8	Final
(Quebec) Martin Ferland	0	2	0	1	0	2	0	X	5
(Ontario) John Epping	1	0	2	0	5	0	1	X	9

Sheet B	1	2	3	4	5	6	7	8	Final
(Ontario) Wayne Middaugh	0	0	1	0	1	0	X	X	2
(Alberta) Don Walchuk	2	1	0	3	0	2	X	X	8

Sheet C	1	2	3	4	5	6	7	8	Final
(Newfoundland and Labrador) Randy Ferbey	1	0	1	0	0	1	0	2	5
(Alberta) Brent Bawel	0	1	0	0	1	0	1	0	3

Sheet D	1	2	3	4	5	6	7	8	Final
(Manitoba) Jeff Stoughton	0	1	0	0	4	0	2	X	7
(British Columbia) Jason Montgomery	0	0	0	1	0	1	0	X	2

Sheet E	1	2	3	4	5	6	7	8	Final
(Ontario) Glenn Howard	0	0	1	0	0	0	1	0	2
(British Columbia) Sean Geall	1	0	0	0	1	1	0	0	3

==== Draw 3 ====
Thursday, December 16, 1:30 pm

Sheet A	1	2	3	4	5	6	7	8	Final
(Alberta) Kevin Koe	2	0	0	0	1	0	0	1	4
(Saskatchewan) Pat Simmons	0	0	1	0	0	1	1	0	3

Sheet B	1	2	3	4	5	6	7	8	Final
(Ontario) John Epping	1	0	0	0	1	0	2	0	4
(British Columbia) Bob Ursel	0	1	1	1	0	3	0	1	7

Sheet C	1	2	3	4	5	6	7	8	Final
(Manitoba) Mike McEwen	3	0	0	2	0	1	0	X	6
(Quebec) Martin Ferland	0	1	1	0	1	0	1	X	4

Sheet D	1	2	3	4	5	6	7	8	Final
(Alberta) Ted Appelman	0	1	0	0	0	0	X	X	1
(Sweden) Niklas Edin	1	0	1	1	3	2	X	X	8

Sheet E	1	2	3	4	5	6	7	8	Final
(Alberta) Kevin Martin	0	1	1	2	1	0	X	X	5
(Manitoba) Kevin Park	0	0	0	0	0	1	X	X	1

==== Draw 4 ====
Thursday, December 16, 5:00 pm

Sheet A	1	2	3	4	5	6	7	8	Final
(Alberta) Don Walchuk	1	0	2	0	0	4	1	X	8
(Alberta) Brent Bawel	0	1	0	1	1	0	0	X	3

Sheet B	1	2	3	4	5	6	7	8	Final
(Manitoba) Kevin Park	1	0	0	0	1	1	0	0	3
(Manitoba) Jeff Stoughton	0	0	1	0	0	0	2	1	4

Sheet C	1	2	3	4	5	6	7	8	Final
(Ontario) Glenn Howard	0	0	2	0	3	0	2	X	7
(British Columbia) Bob Ursel	0	1	0	1	0	2	0	X	4

Sheet D	1	2	3	4	5	6	7	8	Final
(Newfoundland and Labrador) Randy Ferbey	0	2	0	1	0	X	X	X	3
(Ontario) Wayne Middaugh	4	0	1	0	3	X	X	X	8

Sheet E	1	2	3	4	5	6	7	8	Final
(Alberta) Ted Appelman	0	0	1	0	3	0	0	X	4
(British Columbia) Jason Montgomery	1	2	0	3	0	1	1	X	8

==== Draw 5 ====
Thursday, December 16, 8:30 pm

Sheet A	1	2	3	4	5	6	7	8	Final
(Manitoba) Mike McEwen	1	1	0	1	0	0	2	X	5
(British Columbia) Sean Geall	0	0	1	0	2	0	0	X	3

Sheet B	1	2	3	4	5	6	7	8	Final
(Alberta) Kevin Martin	0	0	1	0	2	0	0	0	3
(Sweden) Niklas Edin	1	0	0	2	0	1	0	1	5

Sheet C	1	2	3	4	5	6	7	8	Final
(Alberta) Don Walchuk	1	0	4	0	1	0	2	X	8
(Alberta) Kevin Koe	0	2	0	1	0	2	0	X	5

Sheet D	1	2	3	4	5	6	7	8	Final
(Ontario) John Epping	0	0	1	0	1	X	X	X	2
(Ontario) Glenn Howard	2	1	0	4	0	X	X	X	7

Sheet E	1	2	3	4	5	6	7	8	Final
(Ontario) Wayne Middaugh	4	0	0	0	2	0	0	X	6
(Saskatchewan) Pat Simmons	0	1	1	0	0	1	0	X	3

==== Draw 6 ====
Friday, December 17, 10:00 am

Sheet A	1	2	3	4	5	6	7	8	9	Final
(Manitoba) Kevin Park	0	0	0	1	0	1	0	2	0	4
(British Columbia) Jason Montgomery	0	1	2	0	1	0	0	0	1	5

Sheet B	1	2	3	4	5	6	7	8	Final
(Ontario) John Epping	2	0	0	1	0	3	2	X	8
(British Columbia) Sean Geall	0	1	1	0	1	0	0	X	3

Sheet C	1	2	3	4	5	6	7	8	Final
(Manitoba) Jeff Stoughton	0	1	1	0	1	0	1	1	5
(Alberta) Ted Appelman	1	0	0	1	0	1	0	0	3

Sheet D	1	2	3	4	5	6	7	8	Final
(Alberta) Don Walchuk	0	0	1	1	0	1	0	X	3
(Saskatchewan) Pat Simmons	1	0	0	0	2	0	2	X	5

Sheet E	1	2	3	4	5	6	7	8	Final
(Quebec) Martin Ferland	0	0	0	1	0	X	X	X	1
(British Columbia) Bob Ursel	0	3	1	0	3	X	X	X	7

==== Draw 7 ====
Friday, December 17, 1:30 pm

Sheet A	1	2	3	4	5	6	7	8	Final
(Alberta) Brent Bawel	0	1	0	2	0	1	2	0	6
(Ontario) Wayne Middaugh	2	0	2	0	2	0	0	1	7

Sheet B	1	2	3	4	5	6	7	8	Final
(Ontario) Glenn Howard	0	2	0	0	1	0	2	0	5
(Manitoba) Mike McEwen	1	0	0	3	0	3	0	1	8

Sheet C	1	2	3	4	5	6	7	8	Final
(Alberta) Kevin Martin	2	1	0	2	0	1	0	X	6
(British Columbia) Jason Montgomery	0	0	2	0	2	0	1	X	5

Sheet D	1	2	3	4	5	6	7	8	Final
(Alberta) Kevin Koe	0	0	1	0	2	0	2	0	5
(Newfoundland and Labrador) Randy Ferbey	0	1	0	1	0	1	0	1	4

Sheet E	1	2	3	4	5	6	7	8	Final
(Manitoba) Jeff Stoughton	0	0	2	0	2	0	0	0	4
(Sweden) Niklas Edin	0	2	0	2	0	2	0	1	7

==== Draw 8 ====
Friday, December 17, 5:00 pm

Sheet A	1	2	3	4	5	6	7	8	Final
(Alberta) Don Walchuk	0	0	3	1	0	3	0	X	7
(Newfoundland and Labrador) Randy Ferbey	2	1	0	0	1	0	1	X	5

Sheet B	1	2	3	4	5	6	7	8	Final
(Alberta) Ted Appelman	0	1	0	1	0	2	0	0	4
(Manitoba) Kevin Park	0	0	2	0	1	0	0	2	5

Sheet C	1	2	3	4	5	6	7	8	Final
(Saskatchewan) Pat Simmons	0	1	1	1	2	0	1	X	6
(Alberta) Brent Bawel	2	0	0	0	0	1	0	X	3

Sheet D	1	2	3	4	5	6	7	8	Final
(British Columbia) Sean Geall	0	2	1	0	2	0	0	2	7
(Quebec) Martin Ferland	2	0	0	1	0	3	0	0	6

Sheet E	1	2	3	4	5	6	7	8	9	Final
(Ontario) John Epping	2	0	0	1	0	0	1	1	0	5
(Manitoba) Mike McEwen	0	2	0	0	0	3	0	0	4	9

==== Draw 9 ====
Friday, December 17, 8:30 pm

Sheet A	1	2	3	4	5	6	7	8	Final
(Sweden) Niklas Edin	1	1	0	3	3	X	X	X	8
(British Columbia) Jason Montgomery	0	0	1	0	0	X	X	X	1

Sheet B	1	2	3	4	5	6	7	8	Final
(Alberta) Kevin Koe	0	0	0	1	1	0	0	X	2
(Ontario) Wayne Middaugh	0	0	3	0	0	0	1	X	4

Sheet C	1	2	3	4	5	6	7	8	Final
(Quebec) Martin Ferland	1	0	1	0	1	0	2	0	5
(Ontario) Glenn Howard	0	1	0	1	0	4	0	1	7

Sheet D	1	2	3	4	5	6	7	8	Final
(Alberta) Kevin Martin	0	2	0	1	0	0	0	X	3
(Manitoba) Jeff Stoughton	2	0	2	0	0	1	0	X	5

Sheet E	1	2	3	4	5	6	7	8	Final
(British Columbia) Bob Ursel	1	0	0	2	0	1	0	2	6
(British Columbia) Sean Geall	0	1	0	0	1	0	1	0	3

== Playoffs ==
Quarterfinals; Saturday, 12:00 pm
(Sweden) Niklas Edin	6
(Alberta) Kevin Martin	9
(Alberta) Don Walchuk	5
(Ontario) Wayne Middaugh	6
(Manitoba) Mike McEwen	3
(Ontario) Glenn Howard	4
(Manitoba) Jeff Stoughton	6
(British Columbia) Bob Ursel	4

Semifinals; Saturday, 6:00 pm
(Alberta) Kevin Martin	6
(Ontario) Wayne Middaugh	5
(Ontario) Glenn Howard	5
(Manitoba) Jeff Stoughton	8

Finals; Sunday, 10:00 am
(Alberta) Kevin Martin	5
(Manitoba) Jeff Stoughton	3

=== Quarterfinals ===
Saturday, December 18, 12:00 pm

Sheet A	1	2	3	4	5	6	7	8	Final
(Sweden) Niklas Edin	2	0	0	2	0	2	0	X	6
(Alberta) Kevin Martin	0	2	1	0	4	0	2	X	9

Sheet B	1	2	3	4	5	6	7	8	Final
(Alberta) Don Walchuk	0	0	1	0	1	0	2	1	5
(Ontario) Wayne Middaugh	2	2	0	1	0	1	0	0	6

Sheet D	1	2	3	4	5	6	7	8	Final
(Manitoba) Mike McEwen	0	0	0	1	1	0	1	0	3
(Ontario) Glenn Howard	0	1	0	0	0	2	0	1	4

Sheet E	1	2	3	4	5	6	7	8	9	Final
(Manitoba) Jeff Stoughton	0	2	1	0	0	0	1	0	2	6
(British Columbia) Bob Ursel	0	0	0	2	0	0	0	2	0	4

=== Semifinals ===
Saturday, December 18, 6:00 pm

Sheet B	1	2	3	4	5	6	7	8	Final
(Alberta) Kevin Martin	0	0	2	0	0	2	0	2	6
(Ontario) Wayne Middaugh	0	2	0	0	2	0	1	0	5

Sheet D	1	2	3	4	5	6	7	8	Final
(Ontario) Glenn Howard	0	0	2	0	1	0	2	0	5
(Manitoba) Jeff Stoughton	0	2	0	2	0	3	0	1	8

=== Final ===
Sunday, December 19, 10:00 am

Sheet C	1	2	3	4	5	6	7	8	Final
(Alberta) Kevin Martin	0	0	0	2	1	0	1	1	5
(Manitoba) Jeff Stoughton	0	0	1	0	0	2	0	0	3
