= Pat McCallum =

Canadian curler (born 1969)

- Curler
- Born: September 6, 1969 (age 57); Edmonton, Alberta

Team
- Curling club: Calgary CC; Calgary, AB

Curling career
- Brier: 0

Patrick McCallum (born September 6, 1969, in Edmonton, Alberta) is a Canadian curler.

== Record ==
He was Alberta's Junior Runner-Up in 1988, losing out to Mike Sali, of Calgary. In 1989, he was NACA (Northern Alberta Curling Association) Bonspiel champion, with skip Randy Ferbey, third Don Walchuk, and lead, Greg Muzechka. McCallum played second.

In 1990 he was NACA Northern A Winner with skip Randy Ferbey, giving him an appearance at the Alberta Provincial Men's Curling championship.

In 1992 he played with Arnold Asham and won the Kenora, Ontario "Lake of the Woods" Cashspiel on the WCT. His teammates were: third, Don Harvey, himself at second, and lead Sean Nedohin.

In 1994 he was Kelowna, British Columbia Spiel Runner-Up and Kamloops Crown of Curling Champion with skip Al Hackner, third Randy Ferbey, and lead Richie Yurko. McCallum played second. They defeated 1994 World Champion Rick Folk in the semi-finals of the Kelowna spiel.

In 1995 in Hay River, Northwest Territories he was Arctic Brier Champion with skip Kevin Park. In Smithers, British Columbia he was Merchant Spiel Champion also with skip Kevin Park, they defeated 1995 World Champion, Kerry Burtnyk in the final.

He was 1995 World Curling Tour Championship Quarter-Finalist in Jasper, Alberta with Skip Kevin Park, Third Les Rogers, Second Pat McCallum, Lead Ken Tralnberg.

He is an eight-time Men's Zone winner in Northern Alberta.

He qualified for the 1997 Canadian Olympic Curling Trials with skip Kevin Park. He was second on the official WCT (World Curling Tour) money list in 1997 with skip Kevin Park, third Doran Johnson, lead Kerry Park and McCallum at second.

Also in 1997, he was Edmonton Superleague Champion with skip Kevin Park, third Doran Johnson, lead Kerry Park and himself at second.

In 1998 he was again Edmonton Superleague Champion with skip Randy Ferbey, third Dave Nedohin, second Aaron Skillen, and himself at lead.

In 1998 he was the WCT Championship semi-finalist (at Fort McMurray, Alberta) with skip Randy Ferbey, third David Nedohin, second Carter Rycroft, and himself as lead. They defeated 1998 Olympic Silver medallist Mike Harris in the quarter-finals.

In 2000 he was the Viking Fridge Spiel Champion with skip Randy Ferbey, third Ken Hunka, second Scott Pfiefer, and himself as lead.

In 2000 he was Quarter-Finalist in 2000 Players' Championship in Winnipeg, Manitoba at the Max Bell Centre. Skip Shane Park, Third Scott Park, Lead Kerry Park, and himself at second, losing an extra end game to eventual winner and 2002 Olympics Silver Medallist Kevin Martin. Kevin Martin drew the button to knock the team out.

In 2002 at the Grand Slam of Curling Kia Masters he was a semi-finalist (at Gander, Newfoundland and Labrador), and at the 2002 Canadian Open Grand Slam of Curling he was a quarter-finalist (at Sault Ste. Marie, Ontario).

In 2002 he was the Meyers, Norris, Penny "Roaming Buffalo" Champion (at Wainwright, Alberta) with skip Mark Johnson, third Kevin Park, second Shane Park, and himself as lead.

In 2003 at the Grand Slam of Curling, he was the Canadian Open quarter-finalist (at Brandon, Manitoba) with skip Dale Duguid, third Kevin Park, second Scott Park, and himself at lead.

In 2004 and 2005 he was the alternate for the Jeff Stoughton team in Winnipeg, Manitoba.

He was the 2006/2007 Winnipeg/Asham Superleague Champion. The team was composed of Skip Sean Grassie, Third Dave Boehmer, Second Pat McCallum, and lead Tyler Specula.

2010-2011 Will begin the Season playing lead with former Brier Champion Kevin Park, who is also the current two time reigning Manitoba Provincial Champion as third for Jeff Stoughton. At third will be Chris Galbraith and at second will be Taren Gesell.
