= Randy Ferbey =

Canadian curler (born 1959)

- Curler
- Team Ferbey in 2010
- Born: May 30, 1959 (age 67); Edmonton, Alberta, Canada

Curling career
- Brier: 8 (1987, 1988, 1989, 2001, 2002, 2003, 2004, 2005)
- World Championship: 6 (1988, 1989, 2001, 2002, 2003, 2005)
- Top CTRS ranking: 2nd (2004–05 & 2005–06)
- Grand Slam victories: 3: World Cup/Masters (Feb 2006); Players (2006, 2009)
Medal record
Men's curling
Representing Canada
World Championships
Gold medal – first place	1989 Milwaukee	Team
Gold medal – first place	2002 Bismarck	Team
Gold medal – first place	2003 Winnipeg	Team
Gold medal – first place	2005 Victoria	Team
Silver medal – second place	1988 Lausanne	Team
Representing Alberta
Brier
Gold medal – first place	1988 Chicoutimi-Jonquière
Gold medal – first place	1989 Regina
Gold medal – first place	2001 Ottawa
Gold medal – first place	2002 Calgary
Gold medal – first place	2003 Halifax
Gold medal – first place	2005 Edmonton
Silver medal – second place	2004 Saskatoon
Canadian Olympic Trials
Silver medal – second place	1987 Calgary

Randy S. Ferbey (born May 30, 1959) is a Canadian retired curler from Sherwood Park, Alberta. Ferbey is a six-time Canadian champion and a four-time World Champion. He recently coached the Rachel Homan women's team.

Born in Edmonton, Alberta, Ferbey notably popularized the system of having the skip throw third rocks, when he skipped the team nicknamed "the Ferbey Four", a team that he won four Briers (2001, 2002, 2003, 2005) and narrowly missed winning the 2004 final after giving up an 8-4 lead to Mark Dacey. Others teams in both men's and women's curling have adopted the system of not having the skip throw last stones, such as the Margaretha Sigfridsson rink, who would win an Olympic Silver medal and numerous World silver medals and European gold medals by skipping while throwing lead stones, and Jim Cotter throwing last rocks for John Morris who would together reach the finals of both 2014 Olympic Curling Trials and 2014 Brier. The Ferbey Four also popularized the "numbered zones", when calling out the weight of various draw shots. Many consider the quartet together at its peak from 2002–2006 to be either the best team or very near to the best team in curling history. Nedohin's often near perfect shotmaking (regularly having games in the high 90s), Ferbey's extremely aggressive shot calling, and the stellar brushing and front end stones of Marcel Rocque and Scott Pfeifer (nicknamed Huff and Puff for their tireless work on the broom) made them an incredibly difficult challenge for every opponent.

All together, he has played in eight Briers, six World Championships, four Continental Cups, skipped in two Canadian Mixed Curling Championships, won three Canada Cups, and two TSN Skins Games. In In 2019, Ferbey was named the greatest Canadian male third in history in a TSN poll of broadcasters, reporters and top curlers. As he threw third stones for most of his career, Ferbey was considered a third rather than a skip as his position.

== Career ==
=== Early years with Pat Ryan ===
Ferbey participated in his first Brier in 1987 as a third for Pat Ryan. His first Brier would be a disappointment, as they finished with a 6–5 record. The next year however, Ferbey, Ryan and their team Alberta mates Don Walchuk and Don McKenzie won the Brier, and were thus crowned Canadian champions defeating Eugene Hritzuk of Saskatchewan 8–7 in the final. At the 1988 Worlds, Team Ryan won the silver medal, losing in the finals to Eigil Ramsfjell of Norway 5–4. As defending champions at the 1989 Brier, Team Ryan would not disappoint, capturing their 2nd Canadian championship defeating Rick Folk of British Columbia in a non-eventful 3–2 victory. It was low scoring games like this one, and by teams like Ryan's dubbed the "Ryan Express" that forced the Canadian Curling Association and World Curling Federation to implement the 3-rock rule, and later the 4-rock rule to force more offense. At the 1989 Worlds, Ferbey and Team Ryan won their first World Championships, beating Switzerland's Patrick Hürlimann in the finals. In 1990, Ferbey left the team, and was unsuccessful at attempting to make it to the Brier with his new team of Don Walchuk, Pat McCallum, and Greg Muzechka. Although they did make it to the final four teams at the 1990 Alberta Championships, failing to make the 1990 Labatt Brier in Sault Ste. Marie, Ontario.

=== The "Ferbey Four" ===
After playing his last season with Ryan in 1997 where he played in the British Columbia playdowns, Ferbey teamed up with a young David Nedohin in 1997 with Carter Rycroft and Pat McCallum. After a reasonably successful season, reaching the Semi-Finals of the 1998 World Curling Tour Championship, and winning the Edmonton Superleague, Ferbey picked up Scott Pfeifer, bumping Rycroft to lead.

In 1999, Rycroft left the team to play with Ferbey's main rival, Kevin Martin. Rycroft was replaced by Marcel Rocque. The Ferbey Four that would dominate the Brier for the next few years was complete. Ferbey made his return to the Alberta provincials in 1999. While they didn't win, they did return in 2001 with a bang. They would win the Alberta final against Kevin Martin, 6–4, and then won the 2001 Nokia Brier as well beating Kerry Burtnyk of Manitoba 8–4 in the final. This sent the team to the 2001 Worlds where they lost both their semi-final game and the bronze medal game, which they gave up to Pål Trulsen of Norway. In 2002, Team Ferbey won their second straight provincial final, defeating Mike Vavrek 6–5. Ferbey then went on to win his fourth Brier, the 2002 Nokia Brier, which was his team's 2nd. They beat John Morris 9–4 in the final. This time, at the 2002 Worlds in Bismarck, North Dakota his team won the championship, beating the same Pål Trulsen, 10–5. After defeating Jamie King 10–3 in the 2003 Alberta final, Ferbey and his team would return to the Brier, in 2003 in Halifax, Nova Scotia. In the finals, they beat the home-town favourites Mark Dacey 8–4 in the finals. At the 2003 Ford World Curling Championship, his team won their 2nd world title, beating Ralph Stöckli of Switzerland 10–6 in the finals. The team won their fourth provincial title in 2004, defeating the Kurt Balderston rink in the final, 8–5. The 2004 Nokia Brier was a blip on his team's record. After returning to the Brier for the fourth straight year, an unprecedented feat especially considering the great number of good teams in Alberta, his team would bow out in the final. After a 10–1 round-robin record, Ferbey and his team lost out to the same team they beat the previous year, Mark Dacey of Nova Scotia, in a 10–9 game where Ferbey's team surrendered a lead. However, Team Ferbey did not give up, and their reign would not be over. In 2005, they once again won the Alberta championships, for a record fifth time, defeating the Jamie King rink 8–6 in an extra end. The team once again won the 2005 Canadian championships, setting a record, as his team became the first to win four championships as a team. The final was against Nova Scotia again, albeit a different team, that of Shawn Adams. In another close game, team Ferbey pulled it out and won 5–4 in the final. His trip to the 2005 Men's Ford World Curling Championships were marked with struggles, as the team finished the round-robin with three losses – tied for first with five other teams. After having a 4–3 record, Ferbey mounted eight straight wins for the championship over David Murdoch of Scotland in a convincing 11–4 victory. Additionally, the Ferbey rink was the first team in history to score five on any single end in the world finals – and they managed this feat twice at the 2005 Ford World Curling Championships.

Many attribute Ferbey's success during this time to the boycott that other major teams of the early 2000s had of the Brier, to play in Grand Slam events. Ferbey did not boycott the Brier, and as a result, played in very few Grand Slam events. This however could only possibly be applied to his 2002 and 2003 Brier wins, as his first Brier title in 2001 was before the emergence of the official Grand Slam circuit with all top teams involved in provincial playdowns, and his final Brier title in 2005 was after the conflict had been resolved and player's boycott lifted with all now participating in provincial playdowns. After Ferbey's run of 4 Brier wins from 2001–2005, Ferbey rink failed to win another provincial title, as Kevin Martin's rink would win the 2006, 2007, 2008 and 2009 provincial tournaments; from 2007 onwards with a new team with young guns Ben Hebert and Marc Kennedy as his front end, and former rival John Morris as his third. The Ferbey four would still remain one of the top teams in the country however, as they would win three Grand Slam events in their career, but Kevin Martin and Glenn Howard would supplant Team Ferbey as the two dominant teams in the country over this quadrennial. David Nedohin would lose his edge as the games top shooter over this period as well.

One of the big disappoints for the team was their failure to qualify for the Olympics. After winning their first Brier, the team went 5–4 at the 2001 Canadian Olympic Curling Trials, missing out on the playoffs or a tiebreaker by just 1 game. In 2005 after winning their final Brier, they finished just 4–5 at the Trials that year. In 2009, the team had another disappointing Olympic Trials, finishing 3–4.

=== Teaming up with Brad Gushue ===
In April 2010, Randy Ferbey announced he would be joining Brad Gushue's team effective for the 2010–11 curling season. Ferbey will skip the team, but throw third rocks like he had been with his former team. Previous third, Mark Nichols, will be bumped up to the second position and Ryan Fry will play lead. Jamie Korab, the past lead on Team Gushue, decided to take a year or two off. In an ironic twist, the final game played by the Ferbey four would be against Gushue in the quarterfinals of the 2010 Players' Championships. Ferbey lost to Gushue 8–3. In their first event as a team, the rink lost to Thomas Lips in the final of the 2010 Baden Masters.

In December 2010, Randy Ferbey and David Nedohin announced they would team up once again in an attempt to play in the 2011 Boston Pizza Cup for a chance to represent Alberta at the 2011 Tim Hortons Brier.

On February 9, 2011, Randy Ferbey announced his time curling with Brad Gushue had come to an end. He stated he knew after the Canadian Open Grand Slam Event, he was done curling with them.

=== The final season and retirement ===
In the 2011–12 curling season, Ferbey teamed up with longtime teammate David Nedohin, who threw fourth stones. Ferbey skipped at third position, and Ted Appelman and Brendan Melnyk played as second and lead, respectively. They fared rather well on the World Curling tour, winning The Shoot-Out and finishing second at the Cactus Pheasant Classic. However, they failed to qualify for the playoffs at the 2011 World Cup of Curling and the 2011 BDO Canadian Open of Curling.

Ferbey decided to retire from competitive curling after attempting to construct a team that might be able to qualify for the 2013 Olympic Trials, a plan which ultimately failed when Nedohin decided to form his own team. He was inducted into the WCF Hall of Fame in 2014.

In 2023 Ferbey and his Team Ferbey rinkmates (David Nedohin, Scott Pfeifer and Marcel Rocque) were inducted into Canada's Sports Hall of Fame.

== Personal life ==
Ferbey is a representative for Everest Funeral Concierge Service. He is married and has three children.

== Teams ==
Season	Skip	Third	Second	Lead	Events
1986–87	Pat Ryan	Randy Ferbey	Don Walchuk	Roy Hebert	1987 Brier
1987–88	Pat Ryan	Randy Ferbey	Don Walchuk	Don McKenzie	1988 Brier, WCC
1988–89	Pat Ryan	Randy Ferbey	Don Walchuk	Don McKenzie	1989 Brier, WCC
1994–95	Brad Hannah	Randy Ferbey	Pat McCallum	Rich Vurko	
1995	Kevin Martin	Randy Ferbey	Don Walchuk	Don Bartlett	
1996–97	Pat Ryan	Ed Lukowich	Randy Ferbey	Merv Bodnarchuk	
1997–98	David Nedohin (fourth)	Randy Ferbey (skip)	Carter Rycroft	Pat McCallum	
1998–99	David Nedohin (fourth)	Randy Ferbey (skip)	Scott Pfeifer	Carter Rycroft	
1999–00	David Nedohin (fourth)	Randy Ferbey (skip)	Scott Pfeifer	Marcel Rocque	
2000–01	David Nedohin (fourth)	Randy Ferbey (skip)	Scott Pfeifer	Marcel Rocque	2001 Alta., Brier, WCC
2001–02	David Nedohin (fourth)	Randy Ferbey (skip)	Scott Pfeifer	Marcel Rocque	2002 Alta., Brier, WCC
2002–03	David Nedohin (fourth)	Randy Ferbey (skip)	Scott Pfeifer	Marcel Rocque	2003 Alta., Brier, WCC
2003–04	David Nedohin (fourth)	Randy Ferbey (skip)	Scott Pfeifer	Marcel Rocque	2004 Alta., Brier
2004–05	David Nedohin (fourth)	Randy Ferbey (skip)	Scott Pfeifer	Marcel Rocque	2005 Alta., Brier, WCC
2007–08	David Nedohin (fourth)	Randy Ferbey (skip)	Scott Pfeifer	Marcel Rocque	2008 Alta.
2008–09	David Nedohin (fourth)	Randy Ferbey (skip)	Scott Pfeifer	Marcel Rocque	2009 Alta.
2009–10	David Nedohin (fourth)	Randy Ferbey (skip)	Scott Pfeifer	Marcel Rocque	2009 COCT, 2010 Alta.
2010–11	Brad Gushue (fourth)	Randy Ferbey (skip)	Mark Nichols	Ryan Fry	
2010–11	Randy Ferbey	David Nedohin	Blayne Iskiw	David Harper	2011 Alta.
2011–12	David Nedohin (fourth)	Randy Ferbey (skip)	Ted Appelman	Brendan Melnyk	

== Grand Slam record ==
Key
C	Champion
F	Lost in Final
SF	Lost in Semifinal
QF	Lost in Quarterfinals
R16	Lost in the round of 16
Q	Did not advance to playoffs
T2	Played in Tier 2 event
DNP	Did not participate in event
N/A	Not a Grand Slam event that season

Event	2003–04	2004–05	2005–06	2006–07	2007–08	2008–09	2009–10	2010–11	2011–12
World Cup/Masters	Q	QF	C	F	QF	QF	Q	QF	Q
The National	DNP	Q	SF	SF	DNP	SF	F	Q	DNP
Canadian Open	DNP	F	SF	F	QF	Q	QF	Q	Q
Players'	DNP	DNP	C	SF	QF	C	QF	DNP	DNP
