= Steve Petryk =

Canadian curler

- Curler
- Born: July 10, 1963 (age 63); Edmonton, Alberta, Canada

Team
- Curling club: Calgary Winter Club, Calgary

Curling career
- Brier: 1 (1994)
- Top CTRS ranking: 18 (2011-12)

Steven H. Petryk (born July 10, 1963 in Edmonton, Alberta) is a Canadian curler from Calgary, Alberta. He is a former provincial men's and junior champion, and has played in one Brier.

== Curling career ==
Petryk's junior men's curling team which included Dave Zabolotniuk, Lyle Horneland and Denis Krysalka won the Alberta provincial junior title in 1982. The rink would represent Alberta at the 1982 Canadian Junior Men's Curling Championship where the rink finished with a 4-7 record, missing the playoffs. Ottawa Citizen; February 27 1982

After juniors, Petryk would find himself playing for former world champion Ed Lukowich. In 1994, Dr. Petryk won the Alberta provincial championship playing lead for the rink which also included Fred Maxie playing third and younger brother Dan at second. Until Kevin Koe won in 2012, that rink would be the last Calgary-based team to win the provincial title. They would go on to represent Alberta at the 1994 Labatt Brier in Red Deer. The team went 5-6, missing the playoffs.

Petryk would soon leave the Lukowich rink, and after playing for his brother Dan for a few years, began to skip his own team in 2001. He still plays with his brother though, who throws last rocks for the team.

== Personal life ==
Petryk is a dentist with Solara Dental Care in Calgary.
