= 2010 Quebec Men's Provincial Curling Championship =

- Host city: Grand-Mère, Quebec
- Arena: Aréna de Grand-Mère
- Dates: February 7–14
- Winner: Team Gagné
- Curling club: CC Kénogami, Jonquière, Quebec
- Skip: Serge Reid
- Third: François Gionest
- Second: Simon Collin
- Lead: Steeve Villeneuve
- Finalist: Martin Ferland

The 2010 Quebec Men's Provincial Curling Championship was held February 7–14 in at the Aréna de Grand-Mère in Grand-Mère, Quebec. The winning team, skipped by Serge Reid represented Quebec at the 2010 Tim Hortons Brier in Halifax, Nova Scotia.

== Teams ==
Skip	Third	Second	Lead	Curling Club(s)
René Bouffard	Pierre Bleaudoin (skip)	Yvan Trépanier	Jacques Peterson	Club de curling Trois-Rivières, Trois-Rivières
Daniel Bédard	Simon Lejour	Sylvain Lejour	Yannik Lejour	Club de curling de Lacolle, Lacolle
Michel Briand	Daniel Grégoire	Yves Lanthier	Yves Patenaude	Club de curling Longue-Pointe, Montreal/Glenmore Curling Club, Dollard-des-Ormeaux
Ted Butler	Richard Faguy	Dany Beauliu	Michel Laroche	Buckingham Curling Club, Buckingham
Pierre Charette	Ghyslain Richard	Christian Bouchard	Philippe Ménard	Club de curling Thurso, Thurso/Buckingham Curling Club, Buckingham
Marc-André Chartrand	Gabriel Saindon	Sébastian Gilbert	Daniel Bilodeau	Club de curling Noranda, Rouyn-Noranda
Thomas Côté	Mathieu Leprohon	Marc-André Larouche	Antoine Bédard	Club de curling Riverbend, Alma
Robert Desjardins	Philippe Brassard	Yannick Martel	Frédéric Boulanger	Club de curling Chicoutimi, Chicoutimi
Simon Dupuis	Daniel Lemery	Mathieu Beaufort	Louis Biron	Club de curling Thurso, Thurso
Martin Ferland	François Roberge	Shawn Fowler	Maxime Elmaleh	Club de curling Etchemin, Saint-Romuald/Club de curling Laviolette, Trois-Rivières
Mike Fournier	Dwayne Fowler	Derek Lockwood	Mike Kennedy	Glenmore Curling Club, Dollard-des-Ormeaux
Simon Hébert	Claude Arsenault	David Thibeault	Alexandre Butland	Club de curling Baie-Comeau, Baie-Comeau
Olivier Laurin	Raphaël Gendron	Jean-Olivier Hay	Jean-Guy Desjardins	TMR Curling Club, Mount Royal
Paul Lodge	Bruce Radey	Jamie Retchless	Richard Webb	Club de curling Danville, Danville/Club de curling Magog, Magog
Marcel Marchand	Normand Bornais	Pierre Perron	André Beaufort	Club de curling Laviolette, Trois-Rivières/Club de curling Trois-Rivières, Trois-Rivières/Club de curling Aurėle-Racine, Sorel-Tracy
Jean-Michel Ménard	Martin Crête	Éric Sylvain	Jean Gagnon	Club de curling Etchemin, Saint-Romuald/Club de curling Victoria, Sainte-Foy
Steven Munroe	Martin Roy	Jean-Michel Arsenault	Erik Lachance	Club de curling Etchemin, Saint Romuald
Serge Reid	François Gionest	Simon Collin	Steeve Villeneuve	Club de curling Kénogami, Jonquière
Georges Tardif	Alain Leblond	Bernard St-Laurent	Yves Gagnon	Club de curling Rimouski, Rimouski
Tom Wharry	Éric Gravel	Benoit Gagné	Stéphane Lamy	Glenmore Curling Club, Dollard-des-Ormeaux

== Pool A ==
=== Standings ===
Skip	W	L
Reid	8	1
Dupuis	7	2
Ménard	7	2
Fournier	5	4
Bédard	5	4
Tardif	4	5
Briand	2	7
Hébert	2	7
Côté	1	8

=== Results ===
==== February 8 ====
- Ménard 10-4 Briand
- Fournier 11-4 Côté
- Dupuis 12-3 Marchand
- Reid 8-6 Tardif
- Bédard 8-1 Hébert
- Marchand 6-5 Bédard (11)
- Ménard 7-4 Hébert
- Tardif 10-2 Briand
- Dupuis 10-2 Côté
- Reid 8-7 Fournier

==== February 9 ====
- Ménard 10-4 Tardif
- Reid 9-3 Côté
- Briand 9-1 Marchanrd
- Fournier 8-3 Bédard
- Dupuis 6-5 Hébert
- Dupuis 6-5 Fournier
- Bédard 10-4 Briand
- Ménard 9-2 Côté
- Tardif 7-6 Hébert
- Reid 8-4 Marchand

==== February 10 ====
- Bédard 7-6 Tardif (11)
- Reid 7-4 Dupuis
- Hébert 7-6 Fournier
- Ménard 8-5 Marchand
- Côté 11-9 Briand (11)
- Marchand 8-6 Côté
- Briand 6-5 Hébert
- Ménard 7-1 Reid
- Bédard 9-4 Dupuis
- Fournier 7-3 Tardif

==== February 11 ====
- Hébert 11-3 Côté
- Marchand 9-5 Fournier
- Dupuis 13-8 Tardif
- Reid 8-2 Briand
- Ménard 8-3 Bédard
- Fournier 7-4 Briand
- Dupuis 10-7 Ménard
- Reid 11-7 Bédard (11)
- Marchand 8-7 Hébert (11)
- Tardif 9-5 Côté

==== February 12 ====
- Reid 8-6 Hébert
- Tardif 7-6 Marchand (11)
- Bédard 8-7 Côté(11)
- Fournier 10-7 Ménard
- Dupuis 11-8 Briand

== Pool B ==
=== Standings ===
Skip	W	L
Ferland	9	0
Butler	7	2
Charette	6	3
Desjardins	5	4
Beaudoin	4	5
Lodge	4	5
Laurin	3	6
Wharry	3	6
Munroe	2	7
Chartrand	2	7

=== Results ===
==== February 8 ====
- Ferland 7-4 Munroe
- Wharry 8-1 Chartrand
- Lodge 8-6 Desjardins
- Butler 10-6 Laurin
- Charette 11-4 Beaudoin
- Charette 8-5 Lodge
- Ferland 8-4 Beaudoin
- Laurin 11-9 Munroe
- Desjardins 8-3 Chartrand
- Butler 8-5 Wharry

==== February 9 ====
- Ferland 7-3 Laurin
- Butler 7-4 Chartrand
- Lodge 8-7 Munroe
- Wharry 9-5 Charette
- Desjardins 7-6 Beaudoin
- Desjardins 9-3 Wharry
- Munroe 7-6 Charette
- Ferland 7-3 Chartrand
- Beaudoin 11-4 Laurin
- Butler 10-8 Lodge (11)

==== February 10 ====
- Butler 9-6 Beaudoin
- Laurin 6-5 Lodge
- Charette 11-2 Chartrand
- Ferland 8-6 Wharry
- Desjardins 6-5 Munroe (11)
- Lodge 8-4 Chartrand
- Beaudoin 6-2 Munroe
- Ferland 9-7 Butler
- Charette 9-5 Desjardins
- Laurin 6-5 Wharry

==== February 11 ====
- Charette 8-3 Laurin
- Butler 8-5 Desjardins
- Beaudoin 11-5 Wharry
- Ferland 8-7 Lodge
- Munroe 8-3 Chartrand
- Chartrand 8-5 Beaudoin
- Lodge 12-6 Whrry
- Desjardins 8-1 Laurin
- Butler 6-4 Munroe
- Ferland 9-4 Charette

==== February 12 ====
- Munroe 7-6 Wharry
- Ferland 6-4 Desjardins
- Charette 7-6 Butler
- Beaudoin 9-7 Lodge
- Chartrand 10-2 Laurin

== Playoffs ==
=== Quarter final play-ins ===
February 13

==== A2 vs B3 ====
Team	1	2	3	4	5	6	7	8	9	10	Final
Simon Dupuis	0	1	0	0	3	0	0	0	1	0	5
Pierre Charette	0	0	0	2	0	1	1	2	0	1	7

==== B2 vs A3 ====
Team	1	2	3	4	5	6	7	8	9	10	Final
Jean-Michel Ménard	0	2	0	0	2	0	1	0	4	X	9
Ted Butler	0	0	1	1	0	1	0	1	0	X	4

=== Page playoffs ===
Page playoff system
A1	Serge Reid	5
B1	Martin Ferland	3
B3	Pierre Charette	5
A3	Jean-Michel Ménard	10

Semifinal
B1	Martin Ferland	8
A3	Jean-Michel Ménard	3

Final
A1	Serge Reid	8
B2	Martin Ferland	7

==== A1 vs B1 ====
Team	1	2	3	4	5	6	7	8	9	10	Final
Serge Reid	0	0	1	0	1	0	1	0	2	X	5
Martin Ferland	0	0	0	1	0	1	0	1	0	X	3

==== A3 vs B3 ====
Team	1	2	3	4	5	6	7	8	9	10	Final
Pierre Charette	0	1	0	1	0	2	0	1	0	X	5
Jean-Michel Ménard	2	0	3	0	1	0	1	0	3	X	10

==== Semi-final ====
Team	1	2	3	4	5	6	7	8	9	10	Final
Martin Ferland	1	1	0	1	0	0	3	1	1	X	8
Jean-Michel Ménard	0	0	2	0	1	0	0	0	0	X	3

==== Final ====
Team	1	2	3	4	5	6	7	8	9	10	11	Final
Serge Reid	0	2	0	2	0	2	0	1	0	0	1	8
Martin Ferland	0	0	2	0	2	0	2	0	0	1	0	7
