= 2008 Tim Hortons Brier =

Canadian men's curling championship

- Host city: Winnipeg, Manitoba
- Arena: MTS Centre
- Dates: March 8–16
- Attendance: 165,075
- Winner: Alberta
- Curling club: Saville Sports Centre, Edmonton
- Skip: Kevin Martin
- Third: John Morris
- Second: Marc Kennedy
- Lead: Ben Hebert
- Alternate: Adam Enright
- Coach: Jules Owchar
- Finalist: Ontario (Glenn Howard)

The 2008 Tim Hortons Brier, Canada's men's curling championship, was held from March 8 to 16 at the MTS Centre in Winnipeg, Manitoba. Skipped by Kevin Martin, Alberta defeated the defending champion, and reigning World Champion Glenn Howard and Team Ontario. The final pitted arguably the top 2 teams in the world, at least the top 2 teams in the World Curling Tour. The final, while close, failed to live up to expectations, and was widely considered boring, and was full of mistakes due to ice problems. Martin had a draw to the button in the tenth end to win the game.

== Teams ==
Alberta	British Columbia	Manitoba
Saville SC, Edmonton Skip: Kevin Martin; Third: John Morris; Second: Marc Kennedy; Lead: Ben Hebert; Alternate: Adam Enright	Kelowna CC, Kelowna Fourth: Jim Cotter; Skip: Bob Ursel; Second: Kevin Folk; Lead: Rick Sawatsky; Alternate: Tom Buchy	Assiniboine Memorial CC, Winnipeg Skip: Kerry Burtnyk; Third: Dan Kammerlock; Second: Richard Daneault; Lead: Garth Smith; Alternate: Reid Carruthers
New Brunswick	Newfoundland and Labrador	Northern Ontario
Gage G&CC, Oromocto Skip: James Grattan; Third: Mike Kennedy; Second: Jason Vaughan; Lead: Peter Case; Alternate: Andy McCann	Bally Haly G&CC, St. John's Skip: Brad Gushue; Third: Mark Nichols; Second: Chris Schille; Lead: Dave Noftall; Alternate: Glenn Goss	Soo CA, Sault Ste. Marie Skip: Eric Harnden; Third: E. J. Harnden; Second: Ryan Harnden; Lead: Caleb Flaxey; Alternate: Brad Jacobs
Nova Scotia	Ontario	Prince Edward Island
Bridgewater CC, Bridgewater Skip: Brian Rafuse; Third: Curt Palmer; Second: Alan Darragh; Lead: Dave Slauenwhite; Alternate: Glenn Josephson	Coldwater & District CC, Coldwater Skip: Glenn Howard; Third: Richard Hart; Second: Brent Laing; Lead: Craig Savill; Alternate: Steve Bice	Charlottetown CC, Charlottetown Skip: Peter Gallant; Third: Kevin Champion; Second: Mark O'Rourke; Lead: John Desrosiers; Alternate: Mark Butler
Quebec	Saskatchewan	Yukon/Northwest Territories
CC Victoria, Sainte-Foy; CC Etchemin, Saint-Romuald Skip: Jean-Michel Ménard; Third: Martin Crête; Second: Éric Sylvain; Lead: Jean Gagnon; Alternate: Philippe Ménard	Davidson CC, Davidson Skip: Pat Simmons; Third: Jeff Sharp; Second: Gerry Adam; Lead: Steve Laycock; Alternate: Warren Jackson	Whitehorse CC, Whitehorse Skip: Chad Cowan; Third: Wade Scoffin; Second: James Buyck; Lead: Clint Ireland; Alternate: Doug Gee

== Map of teams ==
Provincial Winners

== Round-robin standings ==
Final round-robin standings

Key
Teams to Playoffs
Teams to Tiebreaker

Locale	Skip	W	L	PF	PA	EW	EL	BE	SE	S%
Alberta	Kevin Martin	11	0	86	52	50	40	11	11	89%
Saskatchewan	Pat Simmons	9	2	80	58	50	45	9	12	84%
Ontario	Glenn Howard	9	2	85	50	54	33	11	22	88%
British Columbia	Bob Ursel	7	4	72	66	45	47	15	11	84%
Newfoundland and Labrador	Brad Gushue	7	4	77	69	51	44	13	14	82%
Manitoba	Kerry Burtnyk	6	5	59	66	47	40	2	19	79%
Quebec	Jean-Michel Ménard	4	7	76	69	48	48	11	15	80%
Northern Ontario	Eric Harnden	3	8	65	80	43	53	6	6	79%
Prince Edward Island	Peter Gallant	3	8	61	78	40	50	6	7	77%
Nova Scotia	Brian Rafuse	3	8	60	92	42	56	8	3	77%
New Brunswick	James Grattan	2	9	71	86	46	54	7	5	79%
Yukon/Northwest Territories	Chad Cowan	2	9	57	83	44	50	11	9	79%

== Round-robin results ==
All draw times are listed in Central Standard Time (UTC−6).

=== Draw 1 ===
Saturday, March 8, 14:00

Sheet A	1	2	3	4	5	6	7	8	9	10	Final
Prince Edward Island (Gallant) 🔨	1	0	2	0	1	0	0	1	0	X	5
Northern Ontario (Harnden)	0	1	0	2	0	2	2	0	1	X	8

Sheet B	1	2	3	4	5	6	7	8	9	10	Final
Yukon/Northwest Territories (Cowan)	0	1	0	0	1	0	0	0	2	1	5
Manitoba (Burtnyk) 🔨	2	0	1	1	0	0	1	1	0	0	6

Sheet C	1	2	3	4	5	6	7	8	9	10	Final
British Columbia (Ursel) 🔨	1	0	0	2	0	0	0	0	1	X	4
Ontario (Howard)	0	0	1	0	1	1	2	3	0	X	8

Sheet D	1	2	3	4	5	6	7	8	9	10	Final
Newfoundland and Labrador (Gushue)	0	0	0	2	0	2	0	1	0	1	6
Saskatchewan (Simmons) 🔨	0	0	1	0	4	0	0	0	2	0	7

=== Draw 2 ===
Saturday, March 8, 19:00

Sheet A	1	2	3	4	5	6	7	8	9	10	Final
Newfoundland and Labrador (Gushue)	0	0	0	1	0	0	0	0	X	X	1
Ontario (Howard) 🔨	0	1	2	0	2	0	1	2	X	X	8

Sheet B	1	2	3	4	5	6	7	8	9	10	Final
New Brunswick (Grattan)	0	0	1	0	2	0	1	0	2	1	7
Nova Scotia (Rafuse) 🔨	1	1	0	3	0	2	0	1	0	0	8

Sheet C	1	2	3	4	5	6	7	8	9	10	Final
Alberta (Martin) 🔨	2	1	0	2	0	0	0	1	0	0	6
Quebec (Ménard)	0	0	1	0	0	1	1	0	1	1	5

Sheet D	1	2	3	4	5	6	7	8	9	10	Final
Prince Edward Island (Gallant) 🔨	0	0	0	1	0	0	1	0	1	X	3
Manitoba (Burtnyk)	1	1	1	0	1	1	0	1	0	X	6

=== Draw 3 ===
Sunday, March 9, 8:30

Sheet B	1	2	3	4	5	6	7	8	9	10	Final
Alberta (Martin) 🔨	3	0	0	2	0	0	0	0	1	2	8
British Columbia (Ursel)	0	0	2	0	0	1	0	1	0	0	4

Sheet C	1	2	3	4	5	6	7	8	9	10	Final
Saskatchewan (Simmons) 🔨	0	0	0	2	0	1	1	0	2	2	8
Prince Edward Island (Gallant)	0	1	0	0	2	0	0	2	0	0	5

=== Draw 4 ===
Sunday, March 9, 14:00

Sheet A	1	2	3	4	5	6	7	8	9	10	Final
New Brunswick (Grattan) 🔨	1	0	1	0	2	0	0	0	2	1	7
Alberta (Martin)	0	3	0	2	0	0	0	3	0	0	8

Sheet B	1	2	3	4	5	6	7	8	9	10	11	Final
Quebec (Ménard) 🔨	0	0	3	1	0	1	0	0	0	2	0	7
Ontario (Howard)	0	3	0	0	2	0	0	1	1	0	1	8

Sheet C	1	2	3	4	5	6	7	8	9	10	11	Final
Manitoba (Burtnyk) 🔨	1	0	2	0	2	0	1	1	0	0	1	8
Nova Scotia (Rafuse)	0	2	0	2	0	2	0	0	0	1	0	7

Sheet D	1	2	3	4	5	6	7	8	9	10	Final
Northern Ontario (Harnden) 🔨	1	0	2	0	2	0	0	0	1	0	6
Yukon/Northwest Territories (Cowan)	0	1	0	2	0	1	1	2	0	1	8

=== Draw 5 ===
Sunday, March 9, 19:00

Sheet A	1	2	3	4	5	6	7	8	9	10	Final
British Columbia (Ursel) 🔨	0	1	1	0	0	1	0	1	0	0	4
Saskatchewan (Simmons)	2	0	0	1	1	0	2	0	1	1	8

Sheet B	1	2	3	4	5	6	7	8	9	10	Final
Newfoundland and Labrador (Gushue) 🔨	1	0	0	1	0	2	1	0	2	X	7
Northern Ontario (Harnden)	0	2	0	0	2	0	0	1	0	X	5

Sheet C	1	2	3	4	5	6	7	8	9	10	Final
Yukon/Northwest Territories (Cowan) 🔨	0	1	0	1	0	1	0	1	0	X	4
New Brunswick (Grattan)	0	0	1	0	2	0	2	0	4	X	9

Sheet D	1	2	3	4	5	6	7	8	9	10	Final
Nova Scotia (Rafuse) 🔨	0	0	1	0	1	0	X	X	X	X	2
Quebec (Ménard)	5	3	0	4	0	1	X	X	X	X	13

=== Draw 6 ===
Monday, March 10, 9:30

Sheet A	1	2	3	4	5	6	7	8	9	10	Final
Northern Ontario (Harnden) 🔨	0	2	0	1	0	1	0	0	X	X	4
Ontario (Howard)	1	0	2	0	3	0	2	1	X	X	9

Sheet B	1	2	3	4	5	6	7	8	9	10	Final
Manitoba (Burtnyk) 🔨	2	0	1	1	1	0	2	1	X	X	8
New Brunswick (Grattan)	0	1	0	0	0	2	0	0	X	X	3

Sheet C	1	2	3	4	5	6	7	8	9	10	Final
Quebec (Ménard) 🔨	0	1	1	0	0	1	1	0	1	0	5
British Columbia (Ursel)	1	0	0	2	1	0	0	1	0	1	6

Sheet D	1	2	3	4	5	6	7	8	9	10	Final
Saskatchewan (Simmons) 🔨	0	0	1	0	0	1	0	2	0	X	4
Alberta (Martin)	1	1	0	1	2	0	1	0	1	X	7

=== Draw 7 ===
Monday, March 10, 14:00

Sheet A	1	2	3	4	5	6	7	8	9	10	Final
Alberta (Martin) 🔨	2	0	4	0	2	0	1	X	X	X	9
Prince Edward Island (Gallant)	0	1	0	1	0	2	0	X	X	X	4

Sheet B	1	2	3	4	5	6	7	8	9	10	Final
Nova Scotia (Rafuse) 🔨	0	1	0	1	0	1	0	2	0	X	5
Saskatchewan (Simmons)	1	0	2	0	2	0	1	0	2	X	8

Sheet C	1	2	3	4	5	6	7	8	9	10	Final
Ontario (Howard) 🔨	1	1	1	0	1	0	1	0	2	X	7
Manitoba (Burtnyk)	0	0	0	1	0	1	0	0	0	X	2

Sheet D	1	2	3	4	5	6	7	8	9	10	Final
Yukon/Northwest Territories (Cowan) 🔨	3	0	0	0	0	1	0	1	0	X	5
Newfoundland and Labrador (Gushue)	0	2	1	2	1	0	1	0	2	X	9

=== Draw 8 ===
Monday, March 10, 19:00

Sheet A	1	2	3	4	5	6	7	8	9	10	11	Final
Newfoundland and Labrador (Gushue) 🔨	1	0	0	1	0	2	0	1	0	2	3	10
Quebec (Menard)	0	1	2	0	2	0	0	0	2	0	0	7

Sheet B	1	2	3	4	5	6	7	8	9	10	Final
British Columbia (Ursel) 🔨	2	0	2	0	4	0	0	2	X	X	10
Yukon/Northwest Territories (Cowan)	0	1	0	1	0	2	1	0	X	X	5

Sheet C	1	2	3	4	5	6	7	8	9	10	Final
Prince Edward Island (Gallant) 🔨	1	0	1	0	2	3	0	6	X	X	13
Nova Scotia (Rafuse)	0	1	0	1	0	0	1	0	X	X	3

Sheet D	1	2	3	4	5	6	7	8	9	10	Final
New Brunswick (Grattan) 🔨	2	0	1	0	2	0	3	0	0	1	9
Northern Ontario (Harnden)	0	2	0	1	0	3	0	1	1	0	8

=== Draw 9 ===
Tuesday, March 11, 9:30

Sheet A	1	2	3	4	5	6	7	8	9	10	Final
Prince Edward Island (Gallant) 🔨	3	0	0	1	1	0	0	1	0	1	7
Yukon/Northwest Territories (Cowan)	0	2	1	0	0	1	1	0	1	0	6

Sheet B	1	2	3	4	5	6	7	8	9	10	11	Final
Saskatchewan (Simmons) 🔨	0	1	0	2	0	1	0	1	0	3	1	9
Quebec (Menard)	2	0	1	0	2	0	1	0	2	0	0	8

Sheet C	1	2	3	4	5	6	7	8	9	10	Final
Manitoba (Burtnyk) 🔨	2	1	3	0	1	0	0	2	X	X	9
Northern Ontario (Harnden)	0	0	0	1	0	1	1	0	X	X	3

Sheet D	1	2	3	4	5	6	7	8	9	10	11	Final
Newfoundland and Labrador (Gushue) 🔨	1	0	0	0	1	1	0	0	1	1	0	5
Nova Scotia (Rafuse)	0	0	1	1	0	0	0	3	0	0	1	6

=== Draw 10 ===
Tuesday, March 11, 14:00

Sheet A	1	2	3	4	5	6	7	8	9	10	Final
Quebec (Menard) 🔨	2	0	0	1	0	2	0	0	1	1	7
New Brunswick (Grattan)	0	0	2	0	2	0	1	1	0	0	6

Sheet B	1	2	3	4	5	6	7	8	9	10	Final
Yukon/Northwest Territories (Cowan) 🔨	0	2	0	0	0	0	2	0	0	X	4
Ontario (Howard)	1	0	2	1	2	0	0	0	4	X	10

Sheet C	1	2	3	4	5	6	7	8	9	10	Final
Nova Scotia (Rafuse) 🔨	2	0	1	0	2	0	0	1	0	0	6
Alberta (Martin)	0	2	0	1	0	2	1	0	0	2	8

Sheet D	1	2	3	4	5	6	7	8	9	10	Final
Northern Ontario (Harnden) 🔨	0	0	1	1	2	0	0	1	0	0	5
British Columbia (Ursel)	0	0	0	0	0	3	1	0	2	2	8

=== Draw 11 ===
Tuesday, March 11, 19:00

Sheet A	1	2	3	4	5	6	7	8	9	10	Final
Ontario (Howard) 🔨	0	1	0	1	0	2	0	1	0	X	5
Saskatchewan (Simmons)	1	0	2	0	1	0	2	0	1	X	7

Sheet B	1	2	3	4	5	6	7	8	9	10	Final
New Brunswick (Grattan) 🔨	0	1	0	3	0	1	0	2	0	0	7
Prince Edward Island (Gallant)	1	0	2	0	2	0	1	0	3	1	10

Sheet C	1	2	3	4	5	6	7	8	9	10	11	Final
British Columbia (Ursel) 🔨	0	0	2	0	0	2	0	0	1	1	0	6
Newfoundland and Labrador (Gushue)	0	0	0	2	0	0	2	2	0	0	1	7

Sheet D	1	2	3	4	5	6	7	8	9	10	Final
Alberta (Martin) 🔨	2	0	0	2	4	0	2	X	X	X	10
Manitoba (Burtnyk)	0	2	0	0	0	1	0	X	X	X	3

=== Draw 12 ===
Wednesday, March 12, 9:30

Sheet A	1	2	3	4	5	6	7	8	9	10	Final
Manitoba (Burtnyk) 🔨	0	1	0	1	1	0	1	0	X	X	4
Newfoundland and Labrador (Gushue)	1	0	4	0	0	2	0	2	X	X	9

Sheet B	1	2	3	4	5	6	7	8	9	10	Final
Northern Ontario (Harnden) 🔨	0	0	1	1	0	0	2	0	3	X	7
Nova Scotia (Rafuse)	0	0	0	0	1	0	0	1	0	X	2

Sheet C	1	2	3	4	5	6	7	8	9	10	Final
Yukon/Northwest Territories (Cowan) 🔨	1	0	0	2	0	1	0	0	0	1	5
Quebec (Menard)	0	0	2	0	2	0	0	0	0	0	4

Sheet D	1	2	3	4	5	6	7	8	9	10	Final
Ontario (Howard) 🔨	1	0	1	1	0	3	0	0	0	2	8
New Brunswick (Grattan)	0	2	0	0	2	0	1	0	0	0	5

=== Draw 13 ===
Wednesday, March 12, 14:00

Sheet A	1	2	3	4	5	6	7	8	9	10	11	Final
Nova Scotia (Rafuse) 🔨	0	2	1	0	1	0	0	1	0	2	0	7
British Columbia (Ursel)	0	0	0	1	0	1	3	0	2	0	1	8

Sheet B	1	2	3	4	5	6	7	8	9	10	Final
Newfoundland and Labrador (Gushue) 🔨	1	0	1	0	2	0	1	0	2	0	7
Alberta (Martin)	0	2	0	2	0	2	0	1	0	1	8

Sheet C	1	2	3	4	5	6	7	8	9	10	Final
New Brunswick (Grattan) 🔨	1	0	0	1	0	1	1	0	1	0	5
Saskatchewan (Simmons)	0	2	3	0	1	0	0	1	0	1	8

Sheet D	1	2	3	4	5	6	7	8	9	10	Final
Quebec (Menard) 🔨	1	1	1	0	1	0	4	X	X	X	8
Prince Edward Island (Gallant)	0	0	0	1	0	1	0	X	X	X	2

=== Draw 14 ===
Wednesday, March 12, 19:00

Sheet A	1	2	3	4	5	6	7	8	9	10	Final
Alberta (Martin) 🔨	1	1	0	2	2	0	1	0	1	X	8
Northern Ontario (Harnden)	0	0	1	0	0	2	0	1	0	X	4

Sheet B	1	2	3	4	5	6	7	8	9	10	Final
British Columbia (Ursel) 🔨	2	0	0	3	1	0	0	1	1	X	8
Manitoba (Burtnyk)	0	1	0	0	0	2	1	0	0	X	4

Sheet C	1	2	3	4	5	6	7	8	9	10	Final
Prince Edward Island (Gallant) 🔨	0	1	0	0	2	0	X	X	X	X	3
Ontario (Howard)	2	0	4	1	0	3	X	X	X	X	10

Sheet D	1	2	3	4	5	6	7	8	9	10	Final
Saskatchewan (Simmons) 🔨	0	0	2	0	2	1	0	1	1	X	7
Yukon/Northwest Territories (Cowan)	0	1	0	2	0	0	1	0	0	X	4

=== Draw 15 ===
Thursday, March 13, 9:30

Sheet A	1	2	3	4	5	6	7	8	9	10	11	Final
Yukon/Northwest Territories (Cowan) 🔨	1	0	1	0	2	1	0	1	0	1	0	7
Nova Scotia (Rafuse)	0	1	0	2	0	0	2	0	2	0	1	8

Sheet B	1	2	3	4	5	6	7	8	9	10	Final
Ontario (Howard) 🔨	1	1	0	0	1	0	1	0	0	X	4
Alberta (Martin)	0	0	0	1	0	2	0	3	1	X	7

Sheet C	1	2	3	4	5	6	7	8	9	10	Final
Newfoundland and Labrador (Gushue) 🔨	2	0	2	0	0	2	0	2	0	1	9
New Brunswick (Grattan)	0	3	0	1	1	0	1	0	1	0	7

Sheet D	1	2	3	4	5	6	7	8	9	10	Final
British Columbia (Ursel) 🔨	2	0	0	0	0	0	2	0	2	X	6
Prince Edward Island (Gallant)	0	1	1	0	0	0	0	1	0	X	3

=== Draw 16 ===
Thursday, March 13, 14:00

Sheet A	1	2	3	4	5	6	7	8	9	10	Final
New Brunswick (Grattan) 🔨	2	0	1	0	2	0	1	0	0	0	6
British Columbia (Ursel)	0	1	0	3	0	1	0	2	0	1	8

Sheet B	1	2	3	4	5	6	7	8	9	10	11	Final
Prince Edward Island (Gallant) 🔨	3	1	0	0	1	0	0	0	0	1	0	6
Newfoundland and Labrador (Gushue)	0	0	1	1	0	1	2	0	1	0	1	7

Sheet C	1	2	3	4	5	6	7	8	9	10	Final
Northern Ontario (Harnden) 🔨	0	2	0	1	0	1	0	2	0	1	7
Saskatchewan (Simmons)	0	0	2	0	1	0	1	0	2	0	6

Sheet D	1	2	3	4	5	6	7	8	9	10	Final
Manitoba (Burtnyk) 🔨	0	1	0	1	0	2	1	1	1	X	7
Quebec (Menard)	2	0	0	0	1	0	0	0	0	X	3

=== Draw 17 ===
Thursday, March 13, 19:00

The Quebec vs. Northern Ontario match was the most recent Brier match that went to a second extra end.

Sheet A	1	2	3	4	5	6	7	8	9	10	Final
Saskatchewan (Simmons) 🔨	0	0	0	3	4	0	1	X	X	X	8
Manitoba (Burtnyk)	0	1	0	0	0	1	0	X	X	X	2

Sheet B	1	2	3	4	5	6	7	8	9	10	11	12	Final
Quebec (Menard) 🔨	2	1	0	2	1	0	1	0	1	0	0	1	9
Northern Ontario (Harnden)	0	0	2	0	0	2	0	2	0	2	0	0	8

Sheet C	1	2	3	4	5	6	7	8	9	10	Final
Alberta (Martin) 🔨	0	2	1	0	2	0	1	0	0	1	7
Yukon/Northwest Territories (Cowan)	0	0	0	2	0	1	0	0	1	0	4

Sheet D	1	2	3	4	5	6	7	8	9	10	Final
Nova Scotia (Rafuse) 🔨	1	0	1	0	0	2	0	0	2	0	6
Ontario (Howard)	0	2	0	1	1	0	2	1	0	1	8

== Tiebreaker ==
Friday, March 14, 19:30

Sheet B	1	2	3	4	5	6	7	8	9	10	Final
Newfoundland and Labrador (Gushue) 🔨	0	2	0	1	0	1	0	2	0	X	6
British Columbia (Ursel)	3	0	2	0	1	0	1	0	1	X	8

Player percentages
Newfoundland and Labrador		British Columbia	
David Noftall	89%	Rick Sawatsky	90%
Chris Schille	85%	Kevin Folk	96%
Mark Nichols	86%	Bob Ursel	94%
Brad Gushue	86%	Jim Cotter	86%
Total	86%	Total	91%

== Playoffs ==
Page playoff system
1	Alberta	8
2	Saskatchewan	7
3	Ontario	9
4	British Columbia	7

Semifinal
2	Saskatchewan	7
3	Ontario	8

Final
1	Alberta	5
3	Ontario	4

=== 3 vs. 4 ===
Friday, March 14, 15:00

Sheet C	1	2	3	4	5	6	7	8	9	10	Final
Ontario (Howard) 🔨	2	0	2	0	1	1	0	3	0	X	9
British Columbia (Ursel)	0	2	0	2	0	0	1	0	2	X	7

Player percentages
British Columbia		Ontario	
Rick Sawatsky	98%	Craig Savill	88%
Kevin Folk	89%	Brent Laing	83%
Bob Ursel	74%	Richard Hart	86%
Jim Cotter	75%	Glenn Howard	88%
Total	84%	Total	86%

=== 1 vs. 2 ===
Friday, March 14, 20:00

Sheet C	1	2	3	4	5	6	7	8	9	10	Final
Alberta (Martin) 🔨	0	2	1	0	0	1	0	2	1	1	8
Saskatchewan (Simmons)	2	0	0	2	2	0	1	0	0	0	7

Player percentages
Alberta		Saskatchewan	
Ben Hebert	91%	Steve Laycock	91%
Marc Kennedy	90%	Gerry Adam	86%
John Morris	80%	Jeff Sharp	89%
Kevin Martin	78%	Pat Simmons	74%
Total	85%	Total	85%

=== Semifinal ===
Saturday, March 15, 13:30

Sheet C	1	2	3	4	5	6	7	8	9	10	11	Final
Saskatchewan (Simmons) 🔨	0	1	0	1	0	1	0	3	0	1	0	7
Ontario (Howard)	0	0	2	0	2	0	2	0	1	0	1	8

Player percentages
Saskatchewan		Ontario	
Steve Laycock	84%	Craig Savill	90%
Gerry Adam	76%	Brent Laing	77%
Jeff Sharp	77%	Richard Hart	95%
Pat Simmons	80%	Glenn Howard	89%
Total	79%	Total	88%

=== Final ===
Sunday, March 16, 17:30

Sheet C	1	2	3	4	5	6	7	8	9	10	Final
Alberta (Martin) 🔨	0	1	0	2	0	1	0	0	0	1	5
Ontario (Howard)	0	0	1	0	1	0	0	0	2	0	4

Player percentages
Alberta		Ontario	
Ben Hebert	78%	Craig Savill	89%
Marc Kennedy	84%	Brent Laing	80%
John Morris	90%	Richard Hart	80%
Kevin Martin	79%	Glenn Howard	83%
Total	83%	Total	83%

== Statistics ==
=== Top 5 player percentages ===
Round Robin only

Leads	%
(British Columbia) Rick Sawatsky	91
(Ontario) Craig Savill	91
(Saskatchewan) Steve Laycock	88
(Alberta) Ben Hebert	87
(Ontario) Caleb Flaxey (N. Ont.)	86

Seconds	%
(Alberta) Marc Kennedy	93
(Ontario) Brent Laing	89
(Saskatchewan) Gerry Adam	84
(Newfoundland and Labrador) Chris Schille	83
(Manitoba) Richard Daneault	82

Thirds	%
(Alberta) John Morris	89
(British Columbia) Bob Ursel	85
(Saskatchewan) Jeff Sharp	86
(Ontario) Richard Hart	82
(Quebec) Martin Crête	81

Skips	%
(Alberta) Kevin Martin	88
(Ontario) Glenn Howard	88
(Newfoundland and Labrador) Brad Gushue	81
(Saskatchewan) Pat Simmons	81
(Quebec) Jean-Michel Ménard	79

== Awards and honours ==
All-Star Teams

First Team

- Skip: Kevin Martin (Alberta)
- Third: John Morris (Alberta)
- Second: Marc Kennedy (Alberta)
- Lead: Craig Savill (Ontario)

Second Team

- Skip: Glenn Howard (Ontario)
- Third: Bob Ursel (British Columbia)
- Second: Brent Laing (Ontario)
- Lead: Rick Sawatsky (British Columbia)

Hec Gervais Most Valuable Player Award

- John Morris (Alberta)

Ross Harstone Award

- Gerry Adam (Saskatchewan)

Scotty Harper Award – Media Award

- Jim Henderson, SWEEP Magazine (second win) – $500 award

Paul McLean Award

- Denis Lavoie, CBC-TV Sports, Associate Director

== Playdowns ==
Defending provincial champions in italics

=== Alberta ===
The 2008 Boston Pizza Cup February 12–17, Grant Fuhr Arena, Spruce Grove

Triple knock out format.

Skip	Wins	Losses
Kevin Martin	3	0
Randy Ferbey	4	1
Kevin Koe	4	2
James Pahl	5	2
Kurt Balderston	3	3
Terry Meek	3	3
Shane Park	2	3
David Stewart	2	3
Steve Petryk	2	3
Jeff Ginter	1	3
Darren Moulding	1	3
Ron Chrenek	0	3

Playoffs

- 1 vs. 2: Martin 7-6 Ferbey
- 3 vs. 4: Pahl 3-6 Koe
- Semifinal: Ferbey 11-7 Koe
- Final: Martin 7-4 Ferbey

=== British Columbia ===
February 4–10, Penticton Curling Club, Penticton

Skip	Wins	Losses
Tom Buchy	7	2
Bob Ursel	6	3
Greg McAulay	6	3
Deane Horning	5	4
Dean Joanisse	5	4
Ken McArdle	5	4
Sean Geall	4	5
Steve Waatainen	4	5
Wes Craig	3	6
Michael Dahms	0	9

Tie-breakers

- Joanisse 10-5 McArdle
- Horning 11-6 Joanisse

Page Playoffs

- Buchy 2-8 Ursel
- McAulay 8-1 Horning

Semifinal

- McAulay 7-3 Buchy

Final

- McAulay 7-8 Ursel

=== Manitoba ===
February 13–17, Brandon Keystone Centre, Brandon

Double knock out format with a playoff round and then a page playoff championship. After Saturday afternoon draws.

Skip	Wins	Losses
David Bohn	5	0
Kerry Burtnyk	5	0
Vic Peters	5	1
Mike McEwen	6	2
Jeff Stoughton	4	2
Allan Lyburn	4	3
Peter Nicholls	3	3
Don Spriggs	3	3
Chris Galbraith	3	2
Kelly Robertson	3	2
Kelly Skinner	3	2
Reid Carruthers	2	2
Scott Madams	2	2
Bob Sigurdson	2	2
Terry McNamee	2	2
Rae Hainstock	2	2
William Lyburn	1	2
Brendan Taylor	1	2
Daley Peters	1	2
James Kirkness	1	2
Murray Woodward	1	2
Randy Neufeld	1	2
Arnold Asham	1	2
Glenn Parrott	1	2
Lorne Hamblin	0	2
Richard Muntain	0	2
Lionel Walz	0	2
Russell Shackel	0	2
Sam Antila	0	2
Blair Goethals	0	2
Dave Wallace	0	2
Rob Fleming	0	2

Playoffs

- 1 vs. 2: Burtnyk 5-8 Bohn
- 3 vs. 4: Peters 3-5 McEwen
- Semifinal: McEwen 5-7 Burtnyk
- Final: Bohn 5-11 Burtnyk

=== New Brunswick ===
February 13–17, Capital Winter Club, Fredericton

Skip	Wins	Losses
James Grattan	5	2
Jeremy Mallais	4	3
Russ Howard	4	3
Jamie Brannen	4	3
Ryan Sherrard	4	3
Charlie Sullivan	4	3
Marc Lecocq	3	4
David Konefal	0	7

Tie breakers

- Sherrard 9-1 Brannen
- Sullivan 7-3 Howard
- Sullivan 7-6 Sherrard

Semifinal

- Sullivan 5-6 Mallais

Final

- Mallais 2-9 Grattan

Defending champion Paul Dobson did not qualify/participate

=== Newfoundland and Labrador ===
February 5–10, Carol Curling Club, Labrador City

Skip	Wins	Losses
Keith Ryan	8	1
Brad Gushue	7	2
Mark Noseworthy	6	3
Alex Smith	6	3
Bob Skanes	5	4
Gary Wensman	4	5
Rick Roswell	4	5
Dean Branton	3	6
Jeff Staples	2	7
Bruce Adam	0	9

Tiebreaker

- Noseworthy 10-11 Smith

Semifinal

- Gushue 8-4 Smith

Final

- Ryan 3-7 Gushue

=== Northern Ontario ===
February 4–9, Englehart & Area Community Complex, Englehart

Group A

Skip	Wins	Losses
Trevor Clifford	5	2
Claude Lapointe	4	3
Brian Adams Jr.	4	3
Matt Dumontelle	4	3
Scott Henderson	4	3
Al Belec	3	4
Al Harnden	3	4
Chris Milks	1	6

Group B

Skip	Wins	Losses
Jeff Currie	6	1
Rob Gordon	5	2
Eric Harnden	5	2
Tim Phillips	4	3
John Salo	4	3
Kevin Rutledge	2	5
Gary Graham	2	5
Bud O'Donnell	0	7

Tie breakers

- Dumontelle 6-4 Henderson
- Dumontelle 5-3 Adams

Playoffs

- A2 vs. B3: E. Harnden 9-5 Lapointe
- B2 vs. A3: Dumontelle 8-7 Gordon
- B1 vs. A1: Currie 7-3 Clifford
- Quarter final: E. Harnden 11-10 Dumontelle
- Semifinal: E. Harnden 7-3 Clifford
- Final: Currie 3-7 E. Harnden

=== Nova Scotia ===
February 6–10, Wolfville Curling Club, Wolfville
Triple knock-out format.

Skip	Wins	Losses
Scott Saunders	5	0
Brian Rafuse	5	1
Shawn Adams	5	2
Doug MacKenzie	5	2
Mark Kehoe	4	3
Chris Sutherland	4	3
Brent MacDougall	3	3
Steve Ogden	2	3
Jeff Hopkins	2	3
Kent Smith	2	3
Ian Fitzner-LeBlanc	2	3
Dave LeBlanc	1	3
Lowell Goulden	1	3
Don MacIntosh	1	3
Chad Stevens	0	3
Mike Robinson	0	3

Playoffs

- 1 vs. 2: Saunders 3-4 Rafuse
- 3 vs. 4: MacKenzie 5-10 Adams
- Semifinal: Saunders 6-7 Adams
- Final: Rafuse 4-3 Adams

=== Ontario ===
The 2008 TSC Stores Tankard, February 4–10, Waterloo Memorial Recreation Complex, Waterloo

Skip	Wins	Losses
Glenn Howard	9	1
Peter Corner	8	2
Mike Harris	8	2
Rob Lobel	5	5
Wayne Middaugh	5	5
Wayne Tuck Jr.	5	5
Howard Rajala	4	6
Bob Turcotte	4	6
Daryl Shane	3	7
Rob Dickson	2	8
Rob Todd	2	8

Tie breakers

- Tuck 9-4 Middaugh
- Lobel 9-8 Tuck

Page Playoffs

- Howard 4-6 Corner
- Lobel 7-8 Harris

Semifinal

- Harris 2-7 Howard

Final

- Corner 4-9 Howard

=== Prince Edward Island ===
February 5–10, Crapaud Community Curling Club, Crapaud

Skip	Wins	Losses
John Likely	5	2
Peter Gallant	5	2
Rod MacDonald	5	2
Robert Shaw	4	3
Kyle Stevenson	4	3
Tim Cullen	3	4
Ted MacFadyen	2	5
Eddie MacKenzie	0	7

Tiebreaker

- Stevenson 9-6 Shaw

Playoffs

- 1 vs. 2: Likely 5-6 Gallant
- 3 vs. 4: Stevenson 10-3 MacDonald
- Semifinal: Likely 10-5 Stevenson
- Final: Likely 7-8 Gallant

=== Quebec ===
February 5–12, Colisée de Trois-Rivières, Trois-Rivières

Group A

Skip	Wins	Losses
Martin Ferland	9	0
Ted Butler	6	3
François Roberge	5	4
Georges Tardif	5	4
Serge Reid	5	4
Simon Dupuis	5	4
Shawn Fowler	4	5
Marcel Marchand	3	6
Jeff Cheal	3	6
Ian Belleau	0	9

Group B

Skip	Wins	Losses
Jean-Michel Ménard	9	0
Daniel Bédard	8	1
Robert Desjardins	5	4
Jean-Pierre Venne	4	5
Dwayne Fowler	4	5
René Bouffard	4	5
René Lanteigne	4	5
Pierre Blanchard	3	6
Guy Hemmings	3	6
Michael Raby	1	8

Defending champion Pierre Charette is playing third for Hemmings.

Tie breakers

- Tardif 10-4 Reid
- Roberge 7-3 Dupuis
- Roberge 10-2 Tardif

Playoffs

- A2 vs. B3: Desjardins 5-4 Butler
- B2 vs. A3: Roberge 9-4 Bédard
- A1 vs. B1: Ménard 7-5 Ferland
- Quarter-final: Roberge 7-4 Desjardins
- Semi-final: Ferland 7-5 Roberge
- Final: Ménard 7-5 Ferland

=== Saskatchewan ===
February 6–10, Balgonie Arena, Balgonie.
Triple elimination until playoff round.

Skip	Wins	Losses
Randy Bryden	4	0
Pat Simmons	5	1
Darrell McKee	5	2
Joel Jordison	5	2
Monte Armstrong	4	3
Eugene Hritzuk	3	3
Glen Despins	3	3
Brian Humble	3	3
Al Schick	3	3
Mark Herbert	2	3
Carl deConinck Smith	1	3
Gerald Shymko	1	3
Chris Busby	1	3
Derek Boe	1	3
Brent Gedak	0	3
Jamie Schneider	0	3

Playoffs

- 1 vs. 2: Bryden 4-6 Simmons
- 3 vs. 4: Jordison 4-10 McKee
- Semifinal: Bryden 4-6 McKee
- Final: Simmons 10-5 McKee

=== Yukon/Northwest Territories ===
February 14–17, Whitehorse Curling Club, Whitehorse.
Double round robin. Through five draws.

Skip	Wins	Losses
Chad Cowan	4	2
John Solberg	4	2
Steve Moss	4	2
D'arcy Delorey	0	5

Tiebreakers

- Solberg d. Moss
- Cowan 9-8 Solberg

Defending champion Jamie Koe was eliminated in the N.W.T. playdowns.

== See also ==
- 2008 World Men's Curling Championship
- 2008 World Junior Curling Championships
- 2008 World Mixed Doubles Curling Championship
- 2008 Ford World Women's Curling Championship
- 2008 Scotties Tournament of Hearts
