= 2007 Canada Cup of Curling =

2007 Strauss Canada Cup of Curling
- Host city: Kamloops, British Columbia
- Arena: Interior Savings Centre
- Dates: March 13-18, 2007
- Attendance: 30,034
- Men's winner: (Alberta) Randy Ferbey
- Curling club: Granite Curling Club, Edmonton
- Skip: Randy Ferbey
- Fourth: David Nedohin
- Second: Scott Pfeifer
- Lead: Marcel Rocque
- Finalist: (Alberta) Kevin Martin
- Women's winner: (Manitoba) Jennifer Jones
- Curling club: St. Vital Curling Club, Winnipeg
- Skip: Jennifer Jones
- Third: Cathy Overton-Clapham
- Second: Jill Officer
- Lead: Dawn Askin
- Finalist: (Alberta) Cathy King

The 2007 Strauss Canada Cup of Curling was held March 13-18, 2007 at the Interior Savings Centre in Kamloops, British Columbia. The Randy Ferbey rink won their third title and Jennifer Jones won her first title on the women's side.

== Men's event ==
=== Teams ===
Skip	Third	Second	Lead	Locale
John Base	Phil Loevenmark	Collin Mitchell	Paul Moffatt	(Ontario) Oakville Curling Club, Oakville
Kerry Burtnyk	Dan Kammerlock	Richard Daneault	Cory Naharnie	(Manitoba) Assiniboine Memorial Curling Club, Winnipeg
David Nedohin	Randy Ferbey (skip)	Scott Pfeifer	Marcel Rocque	(Alberta) Granite Curling Club, Edmonton
Brad Gushue	Mark Nichols	Chris Schille	Jamie Korab	(Newfoundland and Labrador) Corner Brook Curling Club, Corner Brook
Mark Johnson	Bob Bucholz	Glen Kennedy	Adam Enright	(Alberta) Saville Sports Centre, Edmonton
Joel Jordison	Scott Bitz	Derek Owens	Dean Hicke	(Saskatchewan) Bushell Park Curling Club, Moose Jaw
Blake MacDonald	Kevin Koe (skip)	Carter Rycroft	Nolan Thiessen	(Alberta) Saville Sports Centre, Edmonton
Kevin Martin	John Morris	Marc Kennedy	Ben Hebert	(Alberta) Saville Sports Centre, Edmonton
Jean-Michel Ménard	François Roberge	Éric Sylvain	Maxime Elmaleh	(Quebec) Club de curling Victoria, Sainte-Foy & Clib de curling Etchemin, Saint-Romuald
Jeff Stoughton	Ryan Fry	Rob Fowler	Steve Gould	(Manitoba) Charleswood Curling Club, Winnipeg

=== Preliminary round ===
Key
Teams to Playoffs
Teams to Tiebreaker

Group A	W	L
(Alberta) Kevin Martin	4	1
(Saskatchewan) Joel Jordison	4	1
(Alberta) Kevin Koe	4	1
(Manitoba) Jeff Stoughton	2	3
(Quebec) Jean-Michel Ménard	0	5

Group B	W	L
(Alberta) Randy Ferbey	4	1
(Alberta) Mark Johnson	3	2
(Newfoundland and Labrador) Brad Gushue	3	2
(Ontario) John Base	1	4
(Manitoba) Kerry Burtnyk	0	5

Tie breakers

- Jordison 7-5 Koe
- Gushue 7-6 Johnson

=== Playoffs ===
Page playoff system
A1	Martin	8
B1	Ferbey	4
A2	Jordison	4
B2	Gushue	6

Semifinal
B1	Ferbey	8
B2	Gushue	5

Final
A1	Martin	8
B1	Ferbey	9

== Women's event ==
=== Teams ===
Skip	Third	Second	Lead	Locale
Sherry Anderson	Kim Hodson	Heather Walsh	Donna Gignac	(Saskatchewan) Delisle Curling Club, Delisle
Cheryl Bernard	Susan O'Connor	Carolyn Darbyshire	Cori Bartel	(Alberta) Calgary Winter Club, Calgary
Jennifer Jones	Cathy Overton-Clapham	Jill Officer	Dawn Askin	(Manitoba) St. Vital Curling Club, Winnipeg
Cathy King	Lori Olson	Raylene Rocque	Diane Dealy	(Alberta) Saville Sports Centre, Edmonton
Shannon Kleibrink	Amy Nixon	Bronwen Saunders	Christine Keshen	(Alberta) Calgary Winter Club, Calgary
Stefanie Lawton	Marliese Kasner	Sherri Singler	Chelsey Bell	(Saskatchewan) CN Curling Club, Saskatoon
Sherry Middaugh	Kim Moore	Kate Hamer	Andra Harmark	(Ontario) Coldwater & District Curling Club, Coldwater
Karen Porritt	Janice Blair	Susan Baleja	Alison Harvey	(Manitoba) Asham Arena, Winnipeg
Heather Nedohin	Deb Santos (skip)	Kristie Moore	Kate Horne	(Alberta) Saville Sports Centre, Edmonton
Crystal Webster	Desirée Robertson	Samantha Preston	Stephanie Jordan	(Alberta) Grande Prairie Curling Club, Grande Prairie

Key
Teams to Playoffs

=== Preliminary round ===
Group A	W	L
(Alberta) Cathy King	4	1
(Manitoba) Jennifer Jones	3	2
(Manitoba) Karen Porritt	2	3
(Alberta) Deb Santos	2	3
(Alberta) Cheryl Bernard	1	4

Group B	W	L
(Saskatchewan) Sherry Anderson	4	1
(Alberta) Shannon Kleibrink	4	1
(Saskatchewan) Stefanie Lawton	3	2
(Alberta) Crystal Webster	2	3
(Ontario) Sherry Middaugh	0	5

=== Playoffs ===
Page playoff system
A1	King	6
B1	Anderson	4
A2	Jones	7
B2	Kleibrink	4

Semifinal
B1	Anderson	5
A2	Jones	9

Final
A1	King	7
A2	Jones	10
