= 2000 Labatt Brier =

- Host city: Saskatoon, Saskatchewan
- Arena: Saskatchewan Place
- Dates: March 4–12
- Attendance: 248,793
- Winner: British Columbia
- Curling club: Royal City CC, New Westminster
- Skip: Greg McAulay
- Third: Brent Pierce
- Second: Bryan Miki
- Lead: Jody Sveistrup
- Alternate: Darin Fenton
- Finalist: New Brunswick (Russ Howard)

The 2000 Labatt Brier, the Canadian men's curling championship, was held from March 4 to 12 at Saskatchewan Place in Saskatoon, Saskatchewan. This was the last Brier sponsored by Labatt.

Team British Columbia, who was skipped by Greg McAulay beat out notable teams such as Kevin Martin and Jeff Stoughton, and went on to defeat Russ Howard with a score of 9–5 in the final. As of 2025, this remains British Columbia's most recent Brier title.

A total of 248,793 fans attended the Brier, which broke the record set the year before. This record wouldn't be broken until 2005 and to date remains the second most attended Brier ever.

== Teams ==
The teams are listed as follows:

Alberta	British Columbia	Manitoba
Ottewell CC, Edmonton Skip: Kevin Martin; Third: Don Walchuk; Second: Carter Rycroft; Lead: Don Bartlett; Alternate: Jules Owchar	Royal City CC, New Westminster Skip: Greg McAulay; Third: Brent Pierce; Second: Bryan Miki; Lead: Jody Sveistrup; Alternate: Darin Fenton	Charleswood CC, Winnipeg Skip: Jeff Stoughton; Third: Jon Mead; Second: Garry Van Den Berghe; Lead: Doug Armstrong; Alternate: Darryl Gunnlaugson
New Brunswick	Newfoundland	Northern Ontario
Beaver CC, Moncton Skip: Russ Howard; Third: Wayne Tallon; Second: Rick Perron; Lead: Grant Odishaw; Alternate: Terry Odishaw	St. John's CC, St. John's Skip: Rick Rowsell; Third: Peter Hollett; Second: Ken Ellis; Lead: Craig Dowden (Note: Team Newfoundland alternate Wayne Young threw lead stones in Draw 15.); Alternate: Wayne Young	Idylwylde CC, Sudbury Skip: Tim Phillips; Third: Roger Sauvé; Second: Ron Henderson; Lead: Dan Sauvé (Note: Team Northern Ontario alternate Paul Sauvé threw lead stones in the last end of Draw 6.); Alternate: Paul Sauvé
Nova Scotia	Ontario	Prince Edward Island
Bridgewater CC, Bridgewater Skip: Shawn Adams; Third: Jeff Hopkins; Second: Ben Blanchard; Lead: Jason Blanchard (Note: Team Nova Scotia alternate Robert MacArthur threw lead stones in Draws 10 and 16.); Alternate: Robert MacArthur	Glendale G&CC, Hamilton Skip: Peter Corner; Third: Todd Brandwood; Second: Drew Macklin; Lead: Dwayne Pyper; Alternate: Bill Mackay	Charlottetown CC, Charlottetown Skip: Andrew Robinson; Third: Evan Sullivan; Second: Brian Scales; Lead: Bob Pritchett; Alternate: Kevin Champion
Quebec	Saskatchewan	Yukon/Northwest Territories
CC Victoria, Sainte-Foy Skip: François Roberge; Third: Maxime Elmaleh; Second: Éric Sylvain; Lead: Jean Gagnon; Alternate: Michel St-Onge	Granite CC, Saskatoon Skip: Bruce Korte; Third: Darrell McKee; Second: Roger Korte; Lead: Rory Golanowski; Alternate: Neil Cursons	Whitehorse CC, Whitehorse Skip: Chad Cowan; Third: Doug Bryant; Second: Jason Nolan; Lead: Ross Milward; Alternate: Paul Cowan

== Map of teams ==
Provincial Winners

== Round Robin standings ==
Final Round Robin standings

Key
Teams to Playoffs
Teams to Tiebreaker

Locale	Skip	W	L	W–L	PF	PA	EW	EL	BE	SE	S%
British Columbia	Greg McAulay	9	2	–	76	52	44	40	8	12	85%
New Brunswick	Russ Howard	8	3	2–1, 1–0	88	69	45	44	3	10	83%
Quebec	François Roberge	8	3	2–1, 0–1	71	61	44	38	12	14	86%
Ontario	Peter Corner	8	3	1–2, 1–0	80	62	51	41	5	17	86%
Manitoba	Jeff Stoughton	8	3	1–2, 0–1	72	47	47	38	7	12	87%
Alberta	Kevin Martin	6	5	–	71	66	43	44	5	8	85%
Saskatchewan	Bruce Korte	5	6	–	68	68	48	41	3	11	84%
Prince Edward Island	Andrew Robinson	4	7	–	59	65	38	39	11	9	77%
Yukon/Northwest Territories	Chad Cowan	3	8	1–0	59	73	46	46	6	11	80%
Nova Scotia	Shawn Adams	3	8	0–1	51	80	38	51	7	7	77%
Newfoundland	Rick Rowsell	2	9	1–0	56	84	39	48	7	9	79%
Northern Ontario	Tim Phillips	2	9	0–1	52	76	39	52	2	9	76%

== Round robin results ==
All draw times are listed in Central Time (UTC−6).

=== Draw 1 ===
Saturday, March 4, 2:30 pm

Sheet A	1	2	3	4	5	6	7	8	9	10	Final
Newfoundland (Rowsell)	1	0	0	0	0	2	0	0	0	X	3
British Columbia (McAulay) 🔨	0	1	2	0	1	0	0	2	1	X	7

Sheet B	1	2	3	4	5	6	7	8	9	10	Final
Saskatchewan (Korte)	0	0	1	0	2	0	1	0	1	X	5
Quebec (Roberge) 🔨	0	0	0	2	0	1	0	3	0	X	6

Sheet C	1	2	3	4	5	6	7	8	9	10	Final
New Brunswick (Howard)	0	1	0	3	0	0	1	0	0	X	5
Alberta (Martin) 🔨	1	0	1	0	3	1	0	0	2	X	8

Sheet D	1	2	3	4	5	6	7	8	9	10	Final
Ontario (Corner)	1	0	2	0	1	0	3	0	1	0	8
Manitoba (Stoughton) 🔨	0	1	0	2	0	1	0	1	0	1	6

=== Draw 2 ===
Saturday, March 4, 8:00 pm

Sheet A	1	2	3	4	5	6	7	8	9	10	Final
Alberta (Martin) 🔨	1	0	0	0	0	2	0	0	X	X	3
Ontario (Corner)	0	2	1	1	1	0	2	1	X	X	8

Sheet B	1	2	3	4	5	6	7	8	9	10	Final
Yukon/Northwest Territories (Cowan) 🔨	2	0	2	0	0	1	0	0	0	1	6
Prince Edward Island (Robinson)	0	1	0	2	1	0	0	1	0	0	5

Sheet C	1	2	3	4	5	6	7	8	9	10	11	Final
Northern Ontario (Phillips)	0	1	1	0	1	0	0	1	1	0	2	7
Nova Scotia (Adams) 🔨	1	0	0	2	0	1	1	0	0	0	0	5

Sheet D	1	2	3	4	5	6	7	8	9	10	Final
Newfoundland (Rowsell) 🔨	1	0	0	2	0	2	0	1	0	X	6
Quebec (Roberge)	0	0	2	0	2	0	5	0	2	X	11

=== Draw 3 ===
Sunday, March 5, 10:00 am

Sheet B	1	2	3	4	5	6	7	8	9	10	Final
Northern Ontario (Phillips) 🔨	0	2	1	0	2	0	1	0	1	1	8
New Brunswick (Howard)	3	0	0	3	0	2	0	1	0	0	9

Sheet C	1	2	3	4	5	6	7	8	9	10	Final
Manitoba (Stoughton) 🔨	1	1	0	2	0	2	1	0	X	X	7
Newfoundland (Rowsell)	0	0	1	0	0	0	0	1	X	X	2

=== Draw 4 ===
Sunday, March 5, 2:30 pm

Sheet A	1	2	3	4	5	6	7	8	9	10	Final
Yukon/Northwest Territories (Cowan) 🔨	1	0	2	0	0	0	0	1	0	X	4
Northern Ontario (Phillips)	0	1	0	1	0	1	3	0	2	X	8

Sheet B	1	2	3	4	5	6	7	8	9	10	Final
Nova Scotia (Adams) 🔨	1	3	0	0	0	1	0	1	0	1	7
Alberta (Martin)	0	0	1	1	1	0	1	0	2	0	6

Sheet C	1	2	3	4	5	6	7	8	9	10	Final
Quebec (Roberge) 🔨	0	0	2	0	3	1	1	1	0	X	8
Prince Edward Island (Robinson)	0	0	0	3	0	0	0	0	1	X	4

Sheet D	1	2	3	4	5	6	7	8	9	10	Final
British Columbia (McAulay) 🔨	1	0	0	5	0	2	0	0	2	X	10
Saskatchewan (Korte)	0	1	1	0	2	0	1	1	0	X	6

=== Draw 5 ===
Sunday, March 5, 8:00 pm

Sheet A	1	2	3	4	5	6	7	8	9	10	Final
New Brunswick (Howard) 🔨	1	0	3	0	0	1	0	0	X	X	4
Manitoba (Stoughton)	0	2	0	2	1	0	0	4	X	X	9

Sheet B	1	2	3	4	5	6	7	8	9	10	Final
Ontario (Corner) 🔨	2	0	3	0	2	2	X	X	X	X	9
British Columbia (McAulay)	0	0	0	2	0	0	X	X	X	X	2

Sheet C	1	2	3	4	5	6	7	8	9	10	Final
Saskatchewan (Korte) 🔨	1	1	0	2	0	0	0	2	0	1	7
Yukon/Northwest Territories (Cowan)	0	0	1	0	0	2	1	0	2	0	6

Sheet D	1	2	3	4	5	6	7	8	9	10	Final
Prince Edward Island (Robinson) 🔨	1	0	1	3	7	X	X	X	X	X	12
Nova Scotia (Adams)	0	2	0	0	0	X	X	X	X	X	2

=== Draw 6 ===
Monday, March 6, 10:00 am

Sheet A	1	2	3	4	5	6	7	8	9	10	Final
British Columbia (McAulay) 🔨	0	1	2	0	2	0	0	3	X	X	8
Alberta (Martin)	0	0	0	2	0	1	0	0	X	X	3

Sheet B	1	2	3	4	5	6	7	8	9	10	Final
Quebec (Roberge) 🔨	2	0	0	2	2	0	0	0	1	X	7
Yukon/Northwest Territories (Cowan)	0	1	0	0	0	1	1	0	0	X	3

Sheet C	1	2	3	4	5	6	7	8	9	10	Final
Nova Scotia (Adams) 🔨	0	2	0	0	1	1	0	0	X	X	4
New Brunswick (Howard)	3	0	2	3	0	0	1	2	X	X	11

Sheet D	1	2	3	4	5	6	7	8	9	10	Final
Manitoba (Stoughton) 🔨	0	0	2	0	0	2	1	1	0	X	6
Northern Ontario (Phillips)	0	0	0	1	0	0	0	0	1	X	2

=== Draw 7 ===
Monday, March 6, 2:30 pm

Sheet A	1	2	3	4	5	6	7	8	9	10	Final
Northern Ontario (Phillips) 🔨	0	1	0	0	2	0	2	0	0	X	5
Newfoundland (Rowsell)	1	0	2	2	0	2	0	2	0	X	9

Sheet B	1	2	3	4	5	6	7	8	9	10	Final
Prince Edward Island (Robinson) 🔨	0	0	0	0	0	0	0	1	0	X	1
Manitoba (Stoughton)	0	0	1	0	0	0	1	0	0	X	2

Sheet C	1	2	3	4	5	6	7	8	9	10	Final
Alberta (Martin) 🔨	0	4	2	0	0	4	X	X	X	X	10
Quebec (Roberge)	1	0	0	1	1	0	X	X	X	X	3

Sheet D	1	2	3	4	5	6	7	8	9	10	Final
Saskatchewan (Korte) 🔨	1	0	0	2	0	3	0	1	0	X	7
Ontario (Corner)	0	1	0	0	1	0	1	0	1	X	4

=== Draw 8 ===
Monday, March 6, 8:00 pm

Sheet A	1	2	3	4	5	6	7	8	9	10	Final
Ontario (Corner) 🔨	1	0	2	1	0	0	1	1	0	0	6
Nova Scotia (Adams)	0	2	0	0	1	0	0	0	1	1	5

Sheet B	1	2	3	4	5	6	7	8	9	10	Final
New Brunswick (Howard) 🔨	2	0	0	3	0	0	1	0	3	X	9
Saskatchewan (Korte)	0	1	1	0	2	0	0	2	0	X	6

Sheet C	1	2	3	4	5	6	7	8	9	10	Final
Newfoundland (Rowsell) 🔨	1	0	0	0	0	2	0	1	1	0	5
Prince Edward Island (Robinson)	0	2	0	1	0	0	2	0	0	2	7

Sheet D	1	2	3	4	5	6	7	8	9	10	Final
Yukon/Northwest Territories (Cowan) 🔨	1	1	0	0	0	1	0	1	0	X	4
British Columbia (McAulay)	0	0	1	3	0	0	3	0	1	X	8

=== Draw 9 ===
Tuesday, March 7, 10:00 am

Sheet A	1	2	3	4	5	6	7	8	9	10	Final
Newfoundland (Rowsell) 🔨	0	2	0	0	2	0	1	0	0	X	5
Saskatchewan (Korte)	1	0	3	1	0	1	0	2	2	X	10

Sheet B	1	2	3	4	5	6	7	8	9	10	Final
Manitoba (Stoughton) 🔨	1	0	0	2	0	3	0	1	0	X	7
Nova Scotia (Adams)	0	0	1	0	2	0	1	0	0	X	4

Sheet C	1	2	3	4	5	6	7	8	9	10	Final
Quebec (Roberge) 🔨	0	1	1	0	1	0	2	0	0	0	5
British Columbia (McAulay)	0	0	0	2	0	0	0	2	1	1	6

Sheet D	1	2	3	4	5	6	7	8	9	10	Final
Ontario (Corner) 🔨	1	0	3	0	2	0	0	4	1	X	11
Prince Edward Island (Robinson)	0	2	0	1	0	0	3	0	0	X	6

=== Draw 10 ===
Tuesday, March 7, 2:30 pm

Sheet A	1	2	3	4	5	6	7	8	9	10	Final
Nova Scotia (Adams) 🔨	1	0	0	0	0	1	0	1	0	X	3
Yukon/Northwest Territories (Cowan)	0	1	2	0	1	0	1	0	1	X	6

Sheet B	1	2	3	4	5	6	7	8	9	10	Final
Saskatchewan (Korte) 🔨	1	0	1	0	0	2	0	0	2	0	6
Alberta (Martin)	0	1	0	0	1	0	2	1	0	2	7

Sheet C	1	2	3	4	5	6	7	8	9	10	Final
Prince Edward Island (Robinson) 🔨	1	0	2	1	0	0	1	1	2	X	8
Northern Ontario (Phillips)	0	2	0	0	1	0	0	0	0	X	3

Sheet D	1	2	3	4	5	6	7	8	9	10	Final
British Columbia (McAulay) 🔨	2	0	1	0	0	1	0	0	2	0	6
New Brunswick (Howard)	0	1	0	2	1	0	1	2	0	1	8

=== Draw 11 ===
Tuesday, March 7, 8:00 pm

Sheet A	1	2	3	4	5	6	7	8	9	10	Final
Alberta (Martin) 🔨	1	0	1	0	0	1	1	0	X	X	4
Manitoba (Stoughton)	0	2	0	3	1	0	0	4	X	X	10

Sheet B	1	2	3	4	5	6	7	8	9	10	Final
Yukon/Northwest Territories (Cowan) 🔨	3	1	0	0	0	0	1	0	1	0	6
Newfoundland (Rowsell)	0	0	3	0	1	1	0	1	0	1	7

Sheet C	1	2	3	4	5	6	7	8	9	10	Final
New Brunswick (Howard) 🔨	1	0	0	2	0	3	0	0	0	2	8
Ontario (Corner)	0	0	2	0	3	0	0	1	1	0	7

Sheet D	1	2	3	4	5	6	7	8	9	10	Final
Northern Ontario (Phillips) 🔨	1	0	1	0	0	0	0	0	0	X	2
Quebec (Roberge)	0	1	0	0	1	2	1	1	0	X	6

=== Draw 12 ===
Wednesday, March 8, 10:00 am

Sheet A	1	2	3	4	5	6	7	8	9	10	Final
Quebec (Roberge) 🔨	0	0	3	0	0	1	0	0	3	1	8
Ontario (Corner)	0	1	0	2	0	0	2	1	0	0	6

Sheet B	1	2	3	4	5	6	7	8	9	10	Final
British Columbia (McAulay) 🔨	0	0	3	0	0	2	0	0	1	X	6
Prince Edward Island (Robinson)	0	0	0	1	0	0	0	1	0	X	2

Sheet C	1	2	3	4	5	6	7	8	9	10	Final
Saskatchewan (Korte) 🔨	0	1	0	2	0	1	0	1	0	0	5
Nova Scotia (Adams)	0	0	2	0	2	0	0	0	0	3	7

Sheet D	1	2	3	4	5	6	7	8	9	10	Final
Alberta (Martin) 🔨	1	0	0	1	0	3	0	3	X	X	8
Yukon/Northwest Territories (Cowan)	0	1	0	0	1	0	1	0	X	X	3

=== Draw 13 ===
Wednesday, March 8, 2:30 pm

Sheet A	1	2	3	4	5	6	7	8	9	10	Final
Prince Edward Island (Robinson) 🔨	1	0	0	0	1	1	0	0	0	X	3
New Brunswick (Howard)	0	3	1	1	0	0	3	0	1	X	9

Sheet B	1	2	3	4	5	6	7	8	9	10	Final
Ontario (Corner) 🔨	0	0	1	0	1	0	2	1	0	1	6
Northern Ontario (Phillips)	0	1	0	2	0	1	0	0	1	0	5

Sheet C	1	2	3	4	5	6	7	8	9	10	Final
Yukon/Northwest Territories (Cowan) 🔨	1	0	1	1	0	2	0	0	1	0	6
Manitoba (Stoughton)	0	2	0	0	1	0	3	1	0	1	8

Sheet D	1	2	3	4	5	6	7	8	9	10	Final
Nova Scotia (Adams) 🔨	0	0	1	1	0	2	0	1	0	1	6
Newfoundland (Rowsell)	0	1	0	0	1	0	2	0	0	0	4

=== Draw 14 ===
Wednesday, March 8, 8:00 pm

Sheet A	1	2	3	4	5	6	7	8	9	10	Final
Northern Ontario (Phillips) 🔨	1	0	0	0	0	1	0	X	X	X	2
British Columbia (McAulay)	0	2	1	2	1	0	2	X	X	X	8

Sheet B	1	2	3	4	5	6	7	8	9	10	Final
New Brunswick (Howard) 🔨	1	0	5	0	0	3	1	X	X	X	10
Quebec (Roberge)	0	2	0	1	0	0	0	X	X	X	3

Sheet C	1	2	3	4	5	6	7	8	9	10	Final
Newfoundland (Rowsell) 🔨	0	1	0	1	0	1	0	0	0	X	3
Alberta (Martin)	0	0	3	0	2	0	0	2	0	X	7

Sheet D	1	2	3	4	5	6	7	8	9	10	Final
Manitoba (Stoughton) 🔨	2	0	1	0	2	0	0	0	1	X	6
Saskatchewan (Korte)	0	1	0	1	0	1	0	0	0	X	3

=== Draw 15 ===
Thursday, March 9, 10:00 am

Sheet A	1	2	3	4	5	6	7	8	9	10	Final
Saskatchewan (Korte) 🔨	2	0	2	0	1	0	0	1	0	X	6
Prince Edward Island (Robinson)	0	1	0	1	0	1	0	0	0	X	3

Sheet B	1	2	3	4	5	6	7	8	9	10	Final
Alberta (Martin) 🔨	1	0	1	2	0	0	1	2	0	1	8
Northern Ontario (Phillips)	0	1	0	0	2	0	0	0	2	0	5

Sheet C	1	2	3	4	5	6	7	8	9	10	Final
Ontario (Corner) 🔨	0	2	0	2	0	1	2	0	0	0	7
Yukon/Northwest Territories (Cowan)	1	0	1	0	1	0	0	1	1	1	6

Sheet D	1	2	3	4	5	6	7	8	9	10	Final
New Brunswick (Howard) 🔨	2	0	0	0	3	0	2	0	3	X	10
Newfoundland (Rowsell)	0	2	1	0	0	2	0	1	0	X	6

=== Draw 16 ===
Thursday, March 9, 2:30 pm

Sheet A	1	2	3	4	5	6	7	8	9	10	Final
Yukon/Northwest Territories (Cowan) 🔨	0	2	1	0	3	0	2	0	1	X	9
New Brunswick (Howard)	0	0	0	1	0	2	0	2	0	X	5

Sheet B	1	2	3	4	5	6	7	8	9	10	Final
Newfoundland (Rowsell) 🔨	1	0	0	3	0	1	0	1	0	0	6
Ontario (Corner)	0	1	1	0	4	0	0	0	1	1	8

Sheet C	1	2	3	4	5	6	7	8	9	10	Final
British Columbia (McAulay) 🔨	1	0	1	0	2	0	0	1	0	2	7
Manitoba (Stoughton)	0	1	0	1	0	1	2	0	1	0	6

Sheet D	1	2	3	4	5	6	7	8	9	10	Final
Quebec (Roberge) 🔨	1	0	2	0	0	2	0	2	1	X	8
Nova Scotia (Adams)	0	2	0	1	0	0	1	0	0	X	4

=== Draw 17 ===
Thursday, March 9, 8:00 pm

Sheet A	1	2	3	4	5	6	7	8	9	10	Final
Manitoba (Stoughton) 🔨	0	1	0	1	0	1	1	0	1	0	5
Quebec (Roberge)	1	0	2	0	1	0	0	1	0	1	6

Sheet B	1	2	3	4	5	6	7	8	9	10	Final
Nova Scotia (Adams) 🔨	1	0	1	0	0	0	1	1	0	X	4
British Columbia (McAulay)	0	2	0	1	1	2	0	0	2	X	8

Sheet C	1	2	3	4	5	6	7	8	9	10	Final
Northern Ontario (Phillips) 🔨	0	0	1	0	1	1	0	2	0	X	5
Saskatchewan (Korte)	1	1	0	2	0	0	2	0	1	X	7

Sheet D	1	2	3	4	5	6	7	8	9	10	Final
Prince Edward Island (Robinson) 🔨	1	0	1	1	0	1	0	1	0	3	8
Alberta (Martin)	0	2	0	0	2	0	2	0	1	0	7

== Tiebreaker ==
Friday, March 10, 10:00 am

Sheet B	1	2	3	4	5	6	7	8	9	10	Final
Ontario (Corner) 🔨	1	0	1	1	0	1	0	0	1	0	5
Manitoba (Stoughton)	0	3	0	0	1	0	1	1	0	1	7

Player percentages
Ontario		Manitoba	
Dwayne Pyper	95%	Doug Armstrong	85%
Drew Macklin	81%	Garry Van Den Berghe	93%
Todd Brandwood	80%	Jon Mead	95%
Peter Corner	84%	Jeff Stoughton	91%
Total	85%	Total	91%

== Playoffs ==
Page playoff system
1	British Columbia	5
2	New Brunswick	3
3	Quebec	7
4	Manitoba	5

Semifinal
2	New Brunswick	8
3	Quebec	5

Final
1	British Columbia	9
2	New Brunswick	5

=== 1 vs. 2 ===
Friday, March 10, 8:00 pm

Sheet B	1	2	3	4	5	6	7	8	9	10	Final
British Columbia (McAulay) 🔨	1	0	1	1	0	0	1	1	0	X	5
New Brunswick (Howard)	0	1	0	0	1	0	0	0	1	X	3

Player percentages
British Columbia		New Brunswick	
Jody Sveistrup	88%	Grant Odishaw	93%
Bryan Miki	88%	Rick Perron	91%
Brent Pierce	91%	Wayne Tallon	73%
Greg McAulay	89%	Russ Howard	80%
Total	89%	Total	84%

=== 3 vs. 4 ===
Friday, March 10, 2:30 pm

Sheet B	1	2	3	4	5	6	7	8	9	10	Final
Quebec (Roberge) 🔨	1	0	3	0	2	0	0	0	1	X	7
Manitoba (Stoughton)	0	2	0	2	0	0	1	0	0	X	5

Player percentages
Quebec		Manitoba	
Jean Gagnon	89%	Doug Armstrong	91%
Éric Sylvain	80%	Garry Van Den Berghe	94%
Maxime Elmaleh	91%	Jon Mead	86%
François Roberge	93%	Jeff Stoughton	74%
Total	88%	Total	86%

=== Semifinal ===
Saturday, March 11, 1:30 pm

Sheet B	1	2	3	4	5	6	7	8	9	10	Final
New Brunswick (Howard) 🔨	0	3	0	1	0	1	1	0	2	X	8
Quebec (Roberge)	1	0	1	0	2	0	0	1	0	X	5

Player percentages
New Brunswick		Quebec	
Grant Odishaw	86%	Jean Gagnon	96%
Rick Perron	88%	Éric Sylvain	79%
Wayne Tallon	79%	Maxime Elmaleh	85%
Russ Howard	88%	François Roberge	80%
Total	85%	Total	85%

=== Final ===
Sunday, March 12, 1:30 pm

Sheet B	1	2	3	4	5	6	7	8	9	10	Final
British Columbia (McAulay) 🔨	0	2	0	1	1	0	0	2	3	X	9
New Brunswick (Howard)	0	0	2	0	0	2	1	0	0	X	5

Player percentages
British Columbia		New Brunswick	
Jody Sveistrup	83%	Grant Odishaw	90%
Bryan Miki	98%	Rick Perron	84%
Brent Pierce	91%	Wayne Tallon	74%
Greg McAulay	75%	Russ Howard	76%
Total	87%	Total	81%

== Statistics ==
=== Top 5 player percentages ===
Round Robin only

Key
First All-Star Team
Second All-Star Team

Leads	%
(Saskatchewan) Rory Golanowski	90
(Alberta) Don Bartlett	89
(Ontario) Dwayne Pyper	89
(Quebec) Jean Gagnon	89
(Manitoba) Doug Armstrong	89

Seconds	%
(Quebec) Éric Sylvain	91
(Alberta) Carter Rycroft	86
(British Columbia) Bryan Miki	86
(Ontario) Drew Macklin	85
(Newfoundland and Labrador) Ken Ellis	84
(Manitoba) Garry Van Den Berghe	84

Thirds	%
(Alberta) Don Walchuk	89
(Manitoba) Jon Mead	86
(British Columbia) Brent Pierce	86
(Ontario) Todd Brandwood	85
(Yukon) Doug Bryant	83

Skips	%
(Manitoba) Jeff Stoughton	88
(Ontario) Peter Corner	86
(New Brunswick) Russ Howard	86
(Saskatchewan) Bruce Korte	84
(Quebec) François Roberge	82

=== Perfect games ===
Round robin only; minimum 10 shots thrown

Player	Team	Position	Shots	Opponent
Grant Odishaw	New Brunswick	Lead	14	Nova Scotia
Don Walchuk	Alberta	Third	16	British Columbia
Grant Odishaw	New Brunswick	Lead	20	Ontario

== Awards ==
=== All-Star teams ===
The All-Star Teams were as follows:

First Team
Position	Name	Team
Skip	Jeff Stoughton	Manitoba
Third	Jon Mead	Manitoba
Second	Éric Sylvain	Quebec
Lead	Rory Golanowski	Saskatchewan

Second Team
Position	Name	Team
Skip	Russ Howard	New Brunswick
Third	Don Walchuk	Alberta
Second	Bryan Miki	British Columbia
Lead	Dwayne Pyper	Ontario

=== Ross Harstone Sportsmanship Award ===
The Ross Harstone Sportsmanship Award is presented to the player chosen by their fellow peers as the curler who best represented Harstone's high ideals of good sportsmanship, observance of the rules, exemplary conduct and curling ability.

Name	Position	Team
Bryan Miki	Second	British Columbia

=== Hec Gervais Most Valuable Player Award ===
The Hec Gervais Most Valuable Player Award was awarded to the top player in the playoff round by members of the media.

Name	Position	Team
Bryan Miki	Second	British Columbia
