= Paul Sauvé (curler) =

Canadian curler (1939–2020)

- Born: June 25, 1939; Sudbury, Ontario, Canada
- Died: April 2, 2020 (aged 80)
- Occupations: Curler, teacher, principal
- Known for: First curler to use a stick at the Brier
- Spouse(s): Claire Villeneuve (deceased), Lillian Thibaudeau
- Children: 7 (including Roger and Dan Sauvé)
- Awards: CCA Award of Achievement (1993)

Paul J. Sauvé (June 25, 1939 – April 2, 2020) was a Canadian curler from Sudbury, Ontario.

Sauvé started curling in 1953. Earlier in his career he curled with his brother Yvon, who died of a heart attack at the age of 36.

Sauvé was the coach and fifth man for Team Northern Ontario at the 2000 Labatt Brier, Canada's national men's curling championship. The team, which was skipped by Tim Phillips and included Sauvé's sons Roger and Dan finished with a 2–9 record. Sauvé threw just two stones at the event, in a game against Manitoba. He threw both rocks with a "stick", a device that allows curlers to push the rock from a standing position, rather than sliding. The device had just been legalized by the Canadian Curling Association (CCA) for use in play at the Brier, making Sauvé the first curler to use it at the Brier.

== Personal life ==
Sauvé was married to Claire Villeneuve (before she died) and Lillian Thibaudeau, and had seven children. He attended teachers college in North Bay and worked as a school bus driver, teacher and principal at Long Lake Public School. He also served as president of the Sudbury Manitoulin Children's Aid Society and the Northern Ontario Curling Association. In 1993, he was presented with the CCA's Award of Achievement, and also served on the board of the CCA.
