= 2005 Tim Hortons Brier =

- Host city: Edmonton, Alberta
- Arena: Rexall Place
- Dates: March 5–13
- Attendance: 281,985
- Winner: Alberta
- Curling club: Granite CC, Edmonton
- Skip: Randy Ferbey
- Fourth: David Nedohin
- Second: Scott Pfeifer
- Lead: Marcel Rocque
- Alternate: Dan Holowaychuk
- Coach: Brian Moore
- Finalist: Nova Scotia (Shawn Adams)

The 2005 Tim Hortons Brier, the Canadian men's curling championship, was held at Rexall Place in Edmonton, Alberta from March 5 to 13. The tournament consisted of 12 teams, one from each province, plus a team representing the Yukon and Northwest Territories, plus a team representing Northern Ontario. The defending champion, Mark Dacey, did not participate, as he was knocked out in the Nova Scotia final by Shawn Adams' team. The tournament featured 3-time Brier champion (2001, 2002, 2003) Randy Ferbey of Alberta, 1998 Champion Wayne Middaugh of Ontario, 2003 and 2004 Newfoundland and Labrador champion Brad Gushue, 2000 and 2002 Nova Scotia champion Shawn Adams, 1992 and 2001 Yukon/Northwest Territories champion skip Steve Moss, 1986 New Brunswick champion Wade Blanchard, 2002 and 2003 British Columbia champion (third and second respectively for Pat Ryan), Deane Horning, 1981 and 1996 Prince Edward Island champion lead for Peter MacDonald, Rod MacDonald; 2003 Quebec champion second for Guy Hemmings, Jean-Michel Ménard as well as three new teams: Randy Dutiaume of Manitoba, Mike Jakubo of Northern Ontario and Pat Simmons of Saskatchewan.

The event was a success, with the total attendance of 281,985 setting a Brier record. In the end, the home town team of Randy Ferbey and company won. This was the fourth win in 5 years for the team in their fifth final appearance in a row. They would set a record for the most Brier wins as a complete team. The final, against Shawn Adams' Nova Scotia rink, marked the third year in a row Nova Scotia and Alberta met in the final.

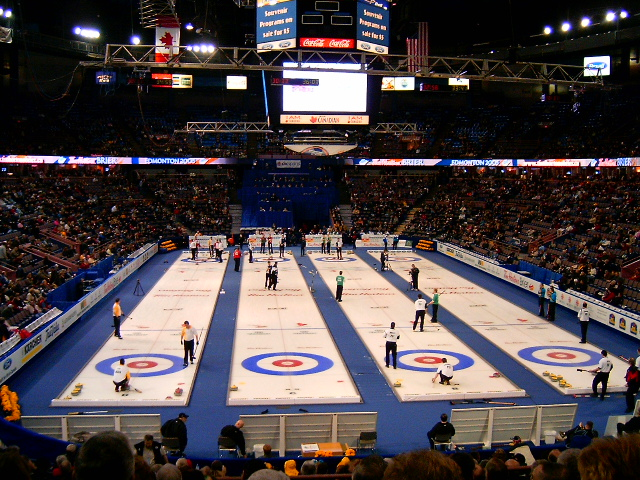
Teams competing during a draw of the 2005 Tim Hortons Brier

== Teams ==
Alberta	British Columbia	Manitoba	New Brunswick
Granite CC, Edmonton Fourth: David Nedohin; Skip: Randy Ferbey; Second: Scott Pfeifer; Lead: Marcel Rocque; Alternate: Dan Holowaychuk	Trail CC, Trail Skip: Deane Horning; Third: Fred Thomson; Second: Don Freschi; Lead: Rob Nobert; Alternate: Grant Fines	Valour Road CC, Winnipeg Skip: Randy Dutiaume; Third: Dave Elias; Second: Greg Melnichuk; Lead: Shane Kilgallen; Alternate: Chris Suchy	Thistle St. Andrews CC, Saint John Skip: Wade Blanchard; Third: Mark Dobson; Second: Paul Dobson; Lead: Geoff Porter; Alternate: Brian Dobson
Newfoundland and Labrador	Northern Ontario	Nova Scotia	Ontario
St. John's CC, St. John's Skip: Brad Gushue; Third: Mark Nichols; Second: Keith Ryan; Lead: Jamie Korab; Alternate: Mike Adam	Copper Cliff CC, Copper Cliff Skip: Mike Jakubo; Third: Jon Solberg; Second: Luc Ouimet; Lead: Lee Toner; Alternate: Rob Ouimet	Bridgewater CC, Bridgewater Skip: Shawn Adams; Third: Paul Flemming; Second: Craig Burgess; Lead: Kelly Mittelstadt; Alternate: Stuart MacLean	St. George's G&CC, Etobicoke Skip: Wayne Middaugh; Third: Graeme McCarrel; Second: Joe Frans; Lead: Scott Bailey; Alternate: David Carruthers
Prince Edward Island	Quebec	Saskatchewan	Northwest Territories/Yukon
Charlottetown CC, Charlottetown Skip: Rod MacDonald; Third: Kevin Champion; Second: Phil Gorveatt; Lead: Mike Dillon; Alternate: Peter MacDonald	CC Victoria, Sainte-Foy Skip: Jean-Michel Ménard; Third: François Roberge; Second: Éric Sylvain; Lead: Maxime Elmaleh; Alternate: Jean Gagnon	Davidson CC, Davidson Skip: Pat Simmons; Third: Jeff Sharp; Second: Chris Haichert; Lead: Ben Hebert; Alternate: Jason Ackerman	Yellowknife CC, Yellowknife Skip: Steve Moss; Third: Darcy Moshenko; Second: Rod Pielak; Lead: Jim Sosiak; Alternate: Mark Whitehead

== Map of teams ==
Provincial Winners

== Round-robin standings ==
Final round-robin standings

Key
Teams to Playoffs

Locale	Skip	W	L	PF	PA	EW	EL	BE	SE	S%
Alberta	Randy Ferbey	9	2	90	58	48	43	7	9	86%
Manitoba	Randy Dutiaume	8	3	77	69	47	44	10	13	79%
Nova Scotia	Shawn Adams	8	3	80	60	47	41	16	13	83%
Quebec	Jean-Michel Ménard	7	4	77	69	54	40	8	15	80%
British Columbia	Deane Horning	6	5	72	65	47	45	18	12	80%
Ontario	Wayne Middaugh	6	5	75	62	42	46	10	7	82%
Newfoundland and Labrador	Brad Gushue	6	5	76	69	48	45	13	10	79%
Saskatchewan	Pat Simmons	6	5	66	61	43	45	12	9	80%
Prince Edward Island	Rod MacDonald	4	7	67	85	41	51	12	5	79%
Northern Ontario	Mike Jakubo	3	8	64	86	41	48	9	6	79%
New Brunswick	Wade Blanchard	3	8	56	83	41	45	17	8	78%
Yukon/Northwest Territories	Steve Moss	0	11	52	85	41	46	14	5	74%

== Round-robin results ==
All draw times are listed in Eastern Standard Time (UTC−5).

=== Draw 1 ===
Saturday, March 5, 16:00

Sheet A	1	2	3	4	5	6	7	8	9	10	Final
Alberta (Ferbey) 🔨	1	1	1	0	4	1	0	3	X	X	11
New Brunswick (Blanchard)	0	0	0	1	0	0	1	0	X	X	2

Sheet B	1	2	3	4	5	6	7	8	9	10	Final
Yukon/Northwest Territories (Moss)	0	2	0	1	0	0	2	0	0	X	5
British Columbia (Horning) 🔨	3	0	3	0	0	2	0	2	0	X	10

Sheet C	1	2	3	4	5	6	7	8	9	10	Final
Manitoba (Dutiaume) 🔨	0	2	0	1	0	2	0	0	1	X	6
Saskatchewan (Simmons)	0	0	0	0	1	0	1	1	0	X	3

Sheet D	1	2	3	4	5	6	7	8	9	10	Final
Northern Ontario (Jakubo) 🔨	2	0	2	1	0	0	3	0	2	0	10
Newfoundland and Labrador (Gushue)	0	2	0	0	1	2	0	4	0	2	11

=== Draw 2 ===
Saturday, March 5, 20:30

Sheet A	1	2	3	4	5	6	7	8	9	10	Final
Saskatchewan (Simmons) 🔨	2	1	0	2	0	3	0	0	X	X	8
Yukon/Northwest Territories (Moss)	0	0	1	0	1	0	0	1	X	X	3

Sheet B	1	2	3	4	5	6	7	8	9	10	11	Final
Nova Scotia (Adams)	0	2	0	2	0	3	0	0	1	0	0	8
Quebec (Ménard) 🔨	0	0	2	0	2	0	1	1	0	2	1	9

Sheet C	1	2	3	4	5	6	7	8	9	10	Final
Ontario (Middaugh)	0	1	3	0	1	1	0	1	0	X	7
Prince Edward Island (MacDonald) 🔨	2	0	0	2	0	0	0	0	1	X	5

Sheet D	1	2	3	4	5	6	7	8	9	10	Final
Manitoba (Dutiaume) 🔨	3	0	0	2	1	0	0	0	0	0	6
British Columbia (Horning)	0	1	0	0	0	1	1	0	1	0	4

=== Draw 3 ===
Sunday, March 6, 11:30

Sheet B	1	2	3	4	5	6	7	8	9	10	Final
Newfoundland and Labrador (Gushue) 🔨	3	0	1	0	0	0	1	0	1	0	6
Alberta (Ferbey)	0	2	0	2	0	1	0	4	0	1	10

Sheet C	1	2	3	4	5	6	7	8	9	10	Final
Northern Ontario (Jakubo) 🔨	0	2	0	0	1	0	0	4	0	X	7
New Brunswick (Blanchard)	0	0	0	0	0	1	1	0	1	X	3

=== Draw 4 ===
Sunday, March 6, 16:00

Sheet A	1	2	3	4	5	6	7	8	9	10	Final
Quebec (Ménard) 🔨	2	0	1	0	2	0	X	X	X	X	5
Ontario (Middaugh)	0	3	0	5	0	3	X	X	X	X	11

Sheet B	1	2	3	4	5	6	7	8	9	10	Final
British Columbia (Horning) 🔨	1	0	1	1	0	0	1	0	1	1	6
Saskatchewan (Simmons)	0	1	0	0	0	2	0	1	0	0	4

Sheet C	1	2	3	4	5	6	7	8	9	10	Final
Yukon/Northwest Territories (Moss) 🔨	1	1	1	0	0	1	0	1	0	1	6
Manitoba (Dutiaume)	0	0	0	3	1	0	2	0	1	0	7

Sheet D	1	2	3	4	5	6	7	8	9	10	Final
Nova Scotia (Adams) 🔨	1	2	0	0	1	0	5	2	X	X	11
Prince Edward Island (MacDonald)	0	0	2	0	0	2	0	0	X	X	4

=== Draw 5 ===
Sunday, March 6, 20:30

Sheet A	1	2	3	4	5	6	7	8	9	10	Final
New Brunswick (Blanchard) 🔨	1	0	1	1	0	0	1	0	X	X	4
Newfoundland and Labrador (Gushue)	0	4	0	0	4	1	0	1	X	X	10

Sheet B	1	2	3	4	5	6	7	8	9	10	Final
Ontario (Middaugh) 🔨	0	1	0	1	0	1	0	2	2	0	7
Nova Scotia (Adams)	1	0	2	0	1	0	1	0	0	3	8

Sheet C	1	2	3	4	5	6	7	8	9	10	Final
Prince Edward Island (MacDonald) 🔨	2	1	0	5	0	0	1	0	0	0	9
Quebec (Ménard)	0	0	1	0	2	1	0	1	1	2	8

Sheet D	1	2	3	4	5	6	7	8	9	10	Final
Alberta (Ferbey) 🔨	4	0	5	0	0	2	X	X	X	X	11
Northern Ontario (Jakubo)	0	1	0	1	1	0	X	X	X	X	3

=== Draw 6 ===
Monday, March 7, 11:30

Sheet A	1	2	3	4	5	6	7	8	9	10	Final
Northern Ontario (Jakubo) 🔨	3	0	0	1	0	1	0	2	0	X	7
Manitoba (Dutiaume)	0	1	0	0	1	0	2	0	2	X	6

Sheet B	1	2	3	4	5	6	7	8	9	10	Final
Newfoundland and Labrador (Gushue) 🔨	0	2	0	2	0	2	0	1	0	2	9
Yukon/Northwest Territories (Moss)	0	0	1	0	2	0	1	0	2	0	6

Sheet C	1	2	3	4	5	6	7	8	9	10	11	Final
Alberta (Ferbey) 🔨	0	2	0	0	2	0	2	0	2	0	1	9
Saskatchewan (Simmons)	2	0	1	1	0	1	0	2	0	1	0	8

Sheet D	1	2	3	4	5	6	7	8	9	10	11	Final
New Brunswick (Blanchard) 🔨	2	1	0	3	0	1	0	0	1	0	2	10
British Columbia (Horning)	0	0	2	0	1	0	2	2	0	1	0	8

=== Draw 7 ===
Monday, March 7, 16:00

Sheet A	1	2	3	4	5	6	7	8	9	10	Final
Yukon/Northwest Territories (Moss) 🔨	0	0	1	0	1	1	0	0	1	0	4
Prince Edward Island (MacDonald)	2	0	0	0	0	0	0	1	0	2	5

Sheet B	1	2	3	4	5	6	7	8	9	10	Final
Manitoba (Dutiaume) 🔨	1	0	2	0	0	3	0	3	0	1	10
Quebec (Ménard)	0	4	0	1	0	0	3	0	1	0	9

Sheet C	1	2	3	4	5	6	7	8	9	10	Final
British Columbia (Horning) 🔨	2	1	0	1	1	0	1	0	1	X	7
Ontario (Middaugh)	0	0	2	0	0	2	0	1	0	X	5

Sheet D	1	2	3	4	5	6	7	8	9	10	Final
Saskatchewan (Simmons) 🔨	0	2	0	0	2	0	2	0	2	X	8
Nova Scotia (Adams)	0	0	2	1	0	1	0	1	0	X	5

=== Draw 8 ===
Monday, March 7, 20:30

Sheet A	1	2	3	4	5	6	7	8	9	10	Final
Nova Scotia (Adams) 🔨	1	0	0	3	0	2	0	1	0	1	8
Alberta (Ferbey)	0	1	0	0	0	0	2	0	1	0	4

Sheet B	1	2	3	4	5	6	7	8	9	10	Final
Ontario (Middaugh) 🔨	3	0	0	2	0	0	0	0	0	0	5
New Brunswick (Blanchard)	0	2	0	0	1	2	0	0	0	1	6

Sheet C	1	2	3	4	5	6	7	8	9	10	Final
Quebec (Ménard) 🔨	1	1	0	2	0	1	2	1	X	X	8
Northern Ontario (Jakubo)	0	0	1	0	1	0	0	0	X	X	2

Sheet D	1	2	3	4	5	6	7	8	9	10	11	Final
Prince Edward Island (MacDonald) 🔨	0	0	2	1	0	1	0	0	2	0	0	6
Newfoundland and Labrador (Gushue)	0	1	0	0	2	0	0	1	0	2	2	8

=== Draw 9 ===
Tuesday, March 8, 11:30

Sheet A	1	2	3	4	5	6	7	8	9	10	Final
Quebec (Ménard) 🔨	1	0	0	2	0	0	1	1	0	1	6
New Brunswick (Blanchard)	0	0	2	0	0	1	0	0	1	0	4

Sheet B	1	2	3	4	5	6	7	8	9	10	Final
Prince Edward Island (MacDonald) 🔨	1	0	1	0	1	0	0	0	1	X	4
Alberta (Ferbey)	0	1	0	1	0	2	1	1	0	X	6

Sheet C	1	2	3	4	5	6	7	8	9	10	Final
Nova Scotia (Adams) 🔨	0	1	0	0	0	2	0	2	0	0	5
Newfoundland and Labrador (Gushue)	1	0	0	0	1	0	1	0	0	1	4

Sheet D	1	2	3	4	5	6	7	8	9	10	Final
Ontario (Middaugh) 🔨	4	0	1	0	2	0	2	0	X	X	9
Northern Ontario (Jakubo)	0	1	0	1	0	2	0	1	X	X	5

=== Draw 10 ===
Tuesday, March 8, 16:00

Sheet A	1	2	3	4	5	6	7	8	9	10	Final
Newfoundland and Labrador (Gushue) 🔨	0	2	0	1	0	1	0	2	0	0	6
British Columbia (Horning)	1	0	1	0	1	0	1	0	0	3	7

Sheet B	1	2	3	4	5	6	7	8	9	10	Final
Northern Ontario (Jakubo) 🔨	1	0	0	2	0	0	1	0	2	0	6
Saskatchewan (Simmons)	0	1	1	0	3	0	0	2	0	1	8

Sheet C	1	2	3	4	5	6	7	8	9	10	Final
New Brunswick (Blanchard) 🔨	2	0	0	1	2	1	0	1	0	1	8
Yukon/Northwest Territories (Moss)	0	3	0	0	0	0	1	0	2	0	6

Sheet D	1	2	3	4	5	6	7	8	9	10	Final
Alberta (Ferbey) 🔨	0	4	3	0	2	0	X	X	X	X	9
Manitoba (Dutiaume)	1	0	0	2	0	2	X	X	X	X	5

=== Draw 11 ===
Tuesday, March 8, 20:30

Sheet A	1	2	3	4	5	6	7	8	9	10	Final
Saskatchewan (Simmons) 🔨	0	2	0	1	0	0	1	0	X	X	4
Ontario (Middaugh)	1	0	1	0	1	1	0	5	X	X	9

Sheet B	1	2	3	4	5	6	7	8	9	10	Final
British Columbia (Horning) 🔨	0	0	0	1	1	0	0	0	0	0	2
Nova Scotia (Adams)	0	0	0	0	0	0	1	1	1	1	4

Sheet C	1	2	3	4	5	6	7	8	9	10	Final
Manitoba (Dutiaume) 🔨	3	0	3	0	1	1	0	1	0	0	9
Prince Edward Island (MacDonald)	0	3	0	1	0	0	2	0	0	1	7

Sheet D	1	2	3	4	5	6	7	8	9	10	Final
Yukon/Northwest Territories (Moss) 🔨	0	2	0	1	0	0	1	0	1	X	5
Quebec (Ménard)	1	0	2	0	2	1	0	2	0	X	8

=== Draw 12 ===
Wednesday, March 9, 11:30

Sheet A	1	2	3	4	5	6	7	8	9	10	Final
Manitoba (Dutiaume) 🔨	3	4	1	0	2	0	0	0	0	X	10
Nova Scotia (Adams)	0	0	0	2	0	2	1	1	2	X	8

Sheet B	1	2	3	4	5	6	7	8	9	10	Final
Yukon/Northwest Territories (Moss) 🔨	1	0	0	0	0	1	0	2	0	X	4
Ontario (Middaugh)	0	0	1	0	1	0	3	0	1	X	6

Sheet C	1	2	3	4	5	6	7	8	9	10	Final
Saskatchewan (Simmons) 🔨	0	0	1	0	2	1	0	1	0	X	5
Quebec (Ménard)	0	1	0	1	0	0	1	0	1	X	4

Sheet D	1	2	3	4	5	6	7	8	9	10	Final
British Columbia (Horning) 🔨	0	3	0	0	0	1	0	5	0	0	9
Prince Edward Island (MacDonald)	0	0	2	0	2	0	1	0	1	1	7

=== Draw 13 ===
Wednesday, March 9, 16:00

Sheet A	1	2	3	4	5	6	7	8	9	10	Final
Prince Edward Island (MacDonald) 🔨	2	0	0	1	0	2	0	4	0	X	9
Northern Ontario (Jakubo)	0	2	0	0	2	0	1	0	2	X	7

Sheet B	1	2	3	4	5	6	7	8	9	10	Final
Quebec (Ménard) 🔨	3	0	0	0	1	0	1	0	1	X	6
Newfoundland and Labrador (Gushue)	0	0	0	1	0	1	0	1	0	X	3

Sheet C	1	2	3	4	5	6	7	8	9	10	Final
Ontario (Middaugh) 🔨	2	0	1	0	1	0	0	0	1	0	5
Alberta (Ferbey)	0	1	0	1	0	3	0	0	0	1	6

Sheet D	1	2	3	4	5	6	7	8	9	10	Final
Nova Scotia (Adams) 🔨	3	0	3	0	0	0	1	1	X	X	8
New Brunswick (Blanchard)	0	1	0	0	0	1	0	0	X	X	2

=== Draw 14 ===
Wednesday, March 9, 20:30

Sheet A	1	2	3	4	5	6	7	8	9	10	Final
Alberta (Ferbey) 🔨	4	0	0	4	0	1	0	1	X	X	10
Yukon/Northwest Territories (Moss)	0	2	0	0	0	0	1	0	X	X	3

Sheet B	1	2	3	4	5	6	7	8	9	10	Final
New Brunswick (Blanchard) 🔨	2	0	0	0	0	1	0	0	1	X	4
Manitoba (Dutiaume)	0	2	1	0	1	0	1	0	0	X	5

Sheet C	1	2	3	4	5	6	7	8	9	10	Final
Northern Ontario (Jakubo) 🔨	0	0	1	1	0	0	1	0	0	0	3
British Columbia (Horning)	0	0	0	0	2	1	0	0	2	1	6

Sheet D	1	2	3	4	5	6	7	8	9	10	Final
Newfoundland and Labrador (Gushue) 🔨	2	0	1	1	2	0	0	0	X	X	6
Saskatchewan (Simmons)	0	1	0	0	0	0	1	0	X	X	2

=== Draw 15 ===
Thursday, March 10, 11:30

Sheet A	1	2	3	4	5	6	7	8	9	10	Final
British Columbia (Horning) 🔨	0	0	2	0	2	0	0	1	1	0	6
Quebec (Ménard)	0	1	0	1	0	2	1	0	0	2	7

Sheet B	1	2	3	4	5	6	7	8	9	10	Final
Saskatchewan (Simmons) 🔨	0	1	0	2	1	2	0	2	X	X	8
Prince Edward Island (MacDonald)	0	0	1	0	0	0	1	0	X	X	2

Sheet C	1	2	3	4	5	6	7	8	9	10	Final
Yukon/Northwest Territories (Moss) 🔨	1	0	1	0	1	0	0	1	0	0	4
Nova Scotia (Adams)	0	1	0	2	0	1	0	0	0	2	6

Sheet D	1	2	3	4	5	6	7	8	9	10	Final
Manitoba (Dutiaume) 🔨	1	2	0	1	1	0	1	0	1	X	7
Ontario (Middaugh)	0	0	1	0	0	1	0	2	0	X	4

=== Draw 16 ===
Thursday, March 10, 16:00

Sheet A	1	2	3	4	5	6	7	8	9	10	Final
New Brunswick (Blanchard) 🔨	0	2	0	0	1	1	0	0	1	0	5
Saskatchewan (Simmons)	0	0	2	2	0	0	0	2	0	2	8

Sheet B	1	2	3	4	5	6	7	8	9	10	11	Final
Alberta (Ferbey) 🔨	1	0	1	0	0	1	0	2	0	2	1	8
British Columbia (Horning)	0	1	0	1	0	0	3	0	2	0	0	7

Sheet C	1	2	3	4	5	6	7	8	9	10	Final
Newfoundland and Labrador (Gushue) 🔨	0	1	0	1	1	0	3	0	0	2	8
Manitoba (Dutiaume)	1	0	2	0	0	1	0	1	1	0	6

Sheet D	1	2	3	4	5	6	7	8	9	10	Final
Northern Ontario (Jakubo) 🔨	1	0	2	0	2	0	3	0	0	X	8
Yukon/Northwest Territories (Moss)	0	2	0	1	0	1	0	1	1	X	6

=== Draw 17 ===
Thursday, March 10, 20:30

Sheet A	1	2	3	4	5	6	7	8	9	10	Final
Ontario (Middaugh) 🔨	1	0	1	0	0	0	4	0	0	1	7
Newfoundland and Labrador (Gushue)	0	1	0	0	1	1	0	1	1	0	5

Sheet B	1	2	3	4	5	6	7	8	9	10	Final
Nova Scotia (Adams) 🔨	3	0	3	0	1	0	0	1	0	1	9
Northern Ontario (Jakubo)	0	2	0	1	0	1	1	0	1	0	6

Sheet C	1	2	3	4	5	6	7	8	9	10	Final
Prince Edward Island (MacDonald) 🔨	1	0	1	0	3	0	0	2	0	2	9
New Brunswick (Blanchard)	0	3	0	3	0	0	1	0	1	0	8

Sheet D	1	2	3	4	5	6	7	8	9	10	Final
Quebec (Ménard) 🔨	1	0	1	0	2	0	1	0	1	1	7
Alberta (Ferbey)	0	2	0	1	0	2	0	1	0	0	6

== Playoffs ==
The Tim Hortons Brier uses the page playoff system where the top four teams with the best records at the end of round-robin play meet in the playoff rounds. The first and second place teams play each other, with the winner advancing directly to the final. The winner of the other page playoff game between the third and fourth place teams plays the loser of the first/second playoff game in the semi-final. The winner of the semi-final moves on to the final.

Page playoffs
1	Alberta	7
2	Manitoba	4
3	Nova Scotia	6
4	Quebec	4

Semifinal
2	Manitoba	7
3	Nova Scotia	8

Final
1	Alberta	5
3	Nova Scotia	4

=== 1 vs. 2 game ===
Friday, March 11, 20:30

Alberta advanced to the 2005 Brier Final with a 7-4 win over Manitoba. The 7th end proved to be pivotal, as Alberta stole it to take a 5-3 lead. Manitoba played Nova Scotia in the semifinal.

Sheet C	1	2	3	4	5	6	7	8	9	10	Final
Alberta (Ferbey) 🔨	2	0	1	0	0	1	1	0	2	X	7
Manitoba (Dutiaume)	0	1	0	1	1	0	0	1	0	X	4

Player percentages
Alberta		Manitoba	
Marcel Rocque	96%	Shane Kilgallen	94%
Scott Pfeifer	85%	Greg Melnichuk	75%
Randy Ferbey	86%	Dave Elias	71%
David Nedohin	95%	Randy Dutiaume	79%
Total	91%	Total	76%

=== 3 vs. 4 game ===
Friday, March 11, 13:00

Nova Scotia eliminated Quebec, giving them a berth in the semifinal. Nova Scotia skip Shawn Adams clinched the game with a draw to the 4-foot to beat two Quebec stones on his last shot of the 10th end.

Sheet C	1	2	3	4	5	6	7	8	9	10	Final
Nova Scotia (Adams) 🔨	1	0	2	0	0	1	0	1	0	1	6
Quebec (Ménard)	0	1	0	2	0	0	0	0	1	0	4

Player percentages
Nova Scotia		Quebec	
Kelly Mittelstadt	75%	Maxime Elmaleh	86%
Craig Burgess	79%	Éric Sylvain	75%
Paul Flemming	86%	François Roberge	93%
Shawn Adams	74%	Jean-Michel Ménard	62%
Total	78%	Total	79%

=== Semifinal ===
Saturday, March 12, 14:00

A mistake by Manitoba's Randy Dutiaume on his final shot in the third end allowed Shawn Adams' Nova Scotia rink to pick up 4 points, and they never looked back despite a late come-back by Manitoba. Nova Scotia would advance to the 2005 Brier Final.

Sheet C	1	2	3	4	5	6	7	8	9	10	Final
Manitoba (Dutiaume) 🔨	0	2	0	1	1	0	1	0	1	1	7
Nova Scotia (Adams)	1	0	4	0	0	2	0	1	0	0	8

Player percentages
Manitoba		Nova Scotia	
Shane Kilgallen	84%	Kelly Mittelstadt	74%
Greg Melnichuk	60%	Craig Burgess	88%
Dave Elias	70%	Paul Flemming	83%
Randy Dutiaume	73%	Shawn Adams	84%
Total	72%	Total	82%

=== Final ===
Sunday, March 13, 19:00

Nova Scotia and Alberta would meet in the Brier Final for the third year in a row, except this time with a different Nova Scotia team. Ferbey and his Alberta foursome were making their fifth straight final appearance. In a close game, Alberta's questionable calls proved to be anything but costly. In the 9th end, Alberta's fourth David Nedohin on his first shot took out his own rock which would end up forcing a blank to keep hammer in the 10th. In the 10th end, Nedohin made another controversial shot, drawing to the 4-foot instead of peeling the corner guard. This forced Nova Scotia's Shawn Adams to make a difficult draw to keep hope alive. Adams' shot sat at the back of the 4-foot, and all Nedohin had to do to win was draw again for the win, which he did. It was their fourth Brier win in the last 5 years.

Sheet C	1	2	3	4	5	6	7	8	9	10	Final
Alberta (Ferbey) 🔨	1	0	1	0	1	1	0	0	0	1	5
Nova Scotia (Adams)	0	2	0	1	0	0	0	1	0	0	4

Player percentages
Alberta		Nova Scotia	
Marcel Rocque	84%	Kelly Mittelstadt	88%
Scott Pfeifer	88%	Paul Flemming	80%
Randy Ferbey	93%	Craig Burgess	90%
David Nedohin	88%	Shawn Adams	81%
Total	88%	Total	85%

== Awards and honours ==
All-Star Teams

First Team

- Skip: David Nedohin (Alberta)
- Third: Randy Ferbey (Alberta)
- Second: Scott Pfeifer (Alberta)
- Lead: Marcel Rocque (Alberta)

Second Team

- Skip: Shawn Adams (Nova Scotia)
- Third: Paul Flemming (Nova Scotia)
- Second: Greg Melnichuk (Manitoba)
- Lead: Kelly Mittelstadt (Nova Scotia)

Hec Gervais Most Valuable Player Award

- David Nedohin (Alberta)

Ross Harstone Award

- Randy Dutiaume (Manitoba)

Scotty Harper Award – Media Award

- Paul Wiecek, Winnipeg Free Press – $500 award

== Statistics ==
=== Top 5 player percentages ===
Round Robin only, minimum 8 games

Leads	%
(Alberta) Marcel Rocque	90
(Nova Scotia) Kelly Mittelstadt	87
(Ontario) Scott Bailey	85
(Saskatchewan) Ben Hebert	85
(New Brunswick) Geoff Porter	85

Seconds	%
(Alberta) Scott Pfeifer	88
(Nova Scotia) Craig Burgess	83
(Manitoba) Greg Melnichuk	82
(Ontario) Joe Frans	81
(Saskatchewan) Chris Haichert	81

Thirds	%
(Alberta) Randy Ferbey	86
(Nova Scotia) Paul Flemming	84
(Prince Edward Island) Kevin Champion	83
(Ontario) Graeme McCarrel	81
(Northern Ontario) Jonathon Solberg	80

Skips	%
(Alberta) David Nedohin	83
(Nova Scotia) Shawn Adams	81
(Ontario) Wayne Middaugh	81
(Quebec) Jean-Michel Ménard	79
(Newfoundland and Labrador) Brad Gushue	78

== Provincial playdowns ==
Defending provincial champions indicated in bold.

=== Alberta ===
@ the Innisfail Arena in Innisfail. Randy Ferbey defeated Jamie King 8-6 in the finals on February 13.
Standings

Pool A

- **Randy Ferbey**, Granite CC, Edmonton (5-0) (won "A1-B1" game; won final)
- Mark Johnson, Saville Centre, Edmonton (4-1) (lost "A2-B3" game)
- Terry Meek, Calgary CC (3-2) (lost "B2-A3" game)
- Kurt Balderston, Sexsmith CC (2-3)
- John Climenhaga, Saville Centre, Edmonton (1-4)
- James Knievel, Manning CC (0-5)

Pool B

- Jamie King, Saville Centre, Edmonton (5-0) (lost "A1-B1" game; won-semi-final; lost final)
- Rob Armitage, Red Deer CC (3-2) (won "A2-B3" game; won quarter-final; lost semi-final)
- John Morris, Innisfail CC (4-1) (won "B2-A3" game; lost quarter-final)
- Dean Davidson, Vermilion CC (2-3)
- Frank Morissette, Calgary CC (1-4)
- Adrian Bakker, Calgary Winter Club (0-5)

=== British Columbia ===
@ the Smithers Curling Club in Smithers. Deane Horning defeated Bob Ursel 7-5 in the finals on February 6.
Standings

- Deane Horning, Trail CC (5-2) (won semi-final, won final)
- Bob Ursel, Kelowna CC (6-1) (lost final)
- Greg McAulay, Richmond CC (5-2) (lost semi-final)
- Brent Pierce, Royal City CC, New Westminster (4-3)
- Bert Gretzinger, Kelowna CC (3-4)
- Wes Craig, Kerry Park CC, Mill Bay (2-5)
- Dean Joanisse, Victoria CC (2-5)
- Tom Buchy, Kimberley (1-6)

Jay Peachey, the defending champion did not qualify

=== Manitoba ===
@ the Selkirk Memorial Arena in Selkirk. Randy Dutiaume defeated Ryan Fry 8-5 in the finals on February 13.
Standings (Double knock-out format until championship round)

- Randy Dutiaume, Valour Road CC, Winnipeg (7-1)
- Ryan Fry, St. Vital CC, Winnipeg (7-3)
- Kerry Burtnyk, Assiniboine Memorial CC, Winnipeg (6-2)
- Jeff Stoughton, Charleswood CC, Winnipeg (5-2)
- **Brent Scales**, Swan River CC (4-2)
- Peter Nicholls, Elmwood CC, Winnipeg (4-2)
- Kelly Robertson, Neepawa CC (4-3)
- Terry McNamee, Brandon CC (3-3)
- Chris Galbraith, Stonewall CC (3-2)
- Don Spriggs, Portage CC, Portage la Prairie (3-2)
- James Kirkness, Ft. Rouge CC, Winnipeg (2-2)
- Blaine Gogal, Flin Flon CC (2-2)
- Doug Riach, St. Vital CC, Winnipeg (2-2)
- Peter Pruden, Petersfield CC (2-2)
- Bob Sigurdson, Granite CC, Winnipeg (2-2)
- Peter Prokopowich, Dauphin CC (1-2)
- Doug Harrison, St. Vital CC, Winnipeg (1-2)
- Brad Wainikka, Morden CC (1-2)
- Dave Boehmer, Grain Ex CC, Winnipeg (1-2)
- Scott Ramsay, Virden CC (1-2)
- Brent Braemer, Assiniboine Memorial CC, Winnipeg (1-2)
- Richard Muntain, St. Vital CC, Winnipeg (1-2)
- Randy Neufeld, LaSalle CC, Sanford (1-2)
- Murray Warren, Deloraine CC (1-2)
- Dave Tibbatts, Binscarth CC (0-2)
- Troy Hamilton, Granite CC, Winnipeg (0-2)
- Kevin Larson, Springfield CC, Dugald (0-2)
- Gerry Janz, Baldur CC (0-2)
- Don Holmes, Flin Flon CC (0-2)
- Doug Gade, Benito CC (0-2)
- Dean Steski, Grain Ex CC, Winnipeg (0-2)
- Rae Hainstock, Thompson CC (0-2)

=== New Brunswick ===
@ the Moncton Curling Association in Moncton. Wade Blanchard defeated Russ Howard 9-4 in the finals on February 6.
Standings

- Wade Blanchard, Thistle St. Andrews, Saint John (5-2) (Won Semi-final; won final)
- **Russ Howard**, Curling Beausejour, Moncton (6-1) (lost final)
- Brian Dobson, Thistle St. Andrews, Saint John (5-2) (lost semi-final)
- Mike Kennedy, Thistle St. Andrews, Saint John (4-3)
- Jim Sullivan, Thistle St. Andrews, Saint John (3-4)
- Trevor Hanson, Capital Winter Club, Fredericton (2-5)
- Wayne Aubie, Bathurst CC (2-5)
- Tim Comeau, Capital Winter Club, Fredericton (1-6)

=== Newfoundland and Labrador ===
@ the Corner Brook Recreation Complex in Corner Brook. Brad Gushue defeated Mark Noseworthy 5-4 in the finals on February 6.
Standings

- **Brad Gushue**, St. John's CC (7-2) (won semi-final, won final)
- Mark Noseworthy, St. John's CC (7-2) (lost final)
- Ken Pedigrew, St. John's CC (6-3) (won tie-breaker; lost semi-final)
- Bas Buckle, Corner Brook CC (6-3) (lost tie-breaker)
- Rick Rowsell, St. John's CC (5-4)
- Gary Oke, Gander CC (5-4)
- Bob Skanes, Gander CC (4-5)
- Bob Dillon, Goose Bay CC, Happy Valley – Goose Bay (3-6)
- Mike Ryan, Carol CC, Labrador City (1-8)
- Tom Byrne, Caribou CC, Stephenville (1-8)

=== Northern Ontario ===
@ the Cobalt-Haileybury Curling Club in Haileybury. Mike Jakubo defeated Tim Phillips 8-7 in the final on February 13.
Staindings

- Mike Jakubo, Copper Cliff CC (6-2) (lost "1-2" game, won semi-final, won final)
- Tim Phillips, Sudbury CC (7-1) (won "1-2" game, lost final)
- Bryan Burgess, Fort William CC, Thunder Bay (4-4) (won tie-braker #1, won tie-breaker #2, won quarter-final, lost semi-final)
- John Salo, Port Arthur CC, Thunder Bay (5-3)
- Daryl Rowlandson, Englehart CC (4-4) (lost tie-breker #2)
- Al Harnden, Soo Curlers Association, Sault Ste. Marie (4-4) (lost tie-breaker #1)
- **Rob Gordon**, Cobalt-Haileybury CC, Haileybury (3-5)
- Dave MacInnes, McIntyre CC, Schumacher (3-5)
- Brent Taylor, Kenora CC (0-8)

=== Nova Scotia ===
@ the Bridgewater Curling Club in Bridgewater. Shawn Adams clinched the championship with a 9-6 win over Mark Dacey on February 8.
Standings (triple knock-out)

- Shawn Adams, Mayflower CC, Halifax (7-1)
- **Mark Dacey**, Mayflower CC, Halifax (6-3)
- Mark Kehoe, Mayflower CC, Halifax (5-3)
- Brian Rafuse, Bridgewater CC (5-3)
- Graham Breckon, Chester CC (4-3)
- Scott Saunders, Mayflower CC, Halifax (4-3)
- Peter Eddy, Mayflower CC, Halifax (3-3)
- Steve Ogden, Mayflower CC, Halifax (3-3)
- Kevin White, Bluenose CC, New Glasgow (3-3)
- Jamie Murphy, Mayflower CC, Halifax (2-3)
- Arnold Burnard, Halifax CC (1-3)
- Don MacIntosh, Truro CC (1-3)
- Doug MacKenzie, Mayflower CC, Halifax (1-3)
- Chad Stevens, Chester CC (1-3)
- Andrew Corkum, Mayflower CC, Halifax (0-3)
- Kevin Ouelette, Lakeshore CC, Lower Sackville (0-3)

=== Ontario ===
The 2005 Ontario Kia Cup was held @ the Iroquois Park Sports Centre in Whitby. Wayne Middaugh defeated Glenn Howard 8-7 in the final on February 13.
Standings

- Wayne Middaugh, St. George's Golf & CC, Etobicoke (8-1) (loses "1-2" game, wins semi-final, wins final)
- Glenn Howard, Coldwater & District CC (7-2) (wins "1-2" game, loses final)
- Peter Corner, Glanford CC, Mount Hope (6-3) (wins quarter-final, loses semi-final)
- Greg Balsdon, Guelph Ctry. Club (6-3) (loses quarter-final)
- Nick Rizzo, Omemee CC (5-4)
- Brian Lewis, Huntley CC, Ottawa (4-5)
- Bryan Cochrane, RCMP CC, Ottawa (4-5)
- Kirk Ziola, Ilderton CC (3-6)
- Josh Adams, Granite CC of West Ottawa (1-8)
- Andrew Fairfull, Guelph CC (1-8)

Mike Harris, the defending champion did not qualify

=== Prince Edward Island ===
@ the Maple Leaf Curling Club in O'Leary Rod MacDonald defeated John Likely 7-6 in the final on February 13.
Standings

- Rod MacDonald, Charlottetown CC (5-2) (won final)
- John Likely (4-3), Charlottetown CC (wins tie-breaker, wins semi-final, lost final)
- Robert Shaw (4-3), Silver Fox, Summerside (wins tie-breaker, loses semi-final)
- Kyle Stevenson (4-3), Charlottetown CC (loses tie-breaker)
- Andrew Robinson (4-3), Charlottetown CC (loses tie-breaker)
- Robert Campbell (3-4), Charlottetown CC
- Mark Minney (3-4), Charlottetown CC
- Kevin Ellsworth Western CCC, Alberton (1-6)

Mike Gaudet, the defending champion did not qualify

=== Quebec ===
@ the Aréna de Grand-Mère in Shawinigan. Jean-Michel Ménard defeated Robert Desjardins 8-4 in the final on February 13.
Standings
A

- Jean-Michel Ménard, CC Etchemin, Saint-Romuald & CC Victoria, Sainte-Foy (7-0) (won "A1-B1" game, win final)
- Robert Desjardins, CC Chicoutimi / CC Kénogami, Jonquière (5-2) (won quarter-final, won semi-final, lost final)
- Denis Roberge, CC Ethemin, Saint-Romuald (4-3)
- Ted Butler, CC Buckingham (4-3)
- **Daniel Lafleur** CC Rosemère, Montreal (3-4)
- Karl Dubé, CC Rimouski (2-5)
- Alain Guy, CC Trois-Rivières & CC Laviolette, Trois-Rivières (2-5)
- Joël Valiquette, CC Vallée de l'or, Sullivan (1-6)

B

- Claude Brazeau, Jr., CC Longue-Pointe, Montreal (7-0) (lost "A1-B1" game, lost semi-final)
- Simon Hébert, CC Baie-Comeau & CC Port-Cartier (5-2) (lost quarter-final)
- Guy Hemmings, CC Longue-Pointe, Montreal (4-3)
- Don Westphal, CC Boucherville (4-3)
- Laurent Lapierre, CC Mont-Bruno, Saint-Bruno (3-4)
- Ghislain Thivierge, CC Riverbend, Alma / CC Kénogami, Jonquière (2-5)
- Tom Wharry, CC Windsor (2-5)
- Stéphane Larouche, CC Lacolle (1-6)

=== Saskatchewan ===
@ the Melfort Curling Club in Melfort. Pat Simmons defeated Daryl Williamson 7-5 in the final on February 13.
Standings:

- Pat Simmons, Davidson CC (5-3) (wins tie-breaker, wins semi-final, wins final)
- Daryl Williamson, Rocanville CC (5-3) (loses final)
- Joel Jordison, Bushell Park CC, Moose Jaw (5-3) (loses semi-final)
- Dale Craig, Nutana CC, Saskatoon (5-3) (loses tie-breaker)
- Doug Harcourt, Humboldt (4-4)
- Jamie Schneider, Tartan CC, Regina (4-4)
- Brian Humble, Sutherland CC, Saskatoon (3-5)
- Scott Bitz, Caledonian CC, Regina (3-5)
- Steve Laycock, Radisson CC (2-6)

Bruce Korte, the defending champion did not qualify

=== Yukon/Northwest Territories ===
@ the Yellowknife Curling Club in Yellowknife, Northwest Territories. Steve Moss clinched the tournament on February 13 with a 6-5 win over Doug Gee.
Standings:

- Steve Moss, Northwest Territories (4-1)
- Peter O'Driscol, Northwest Territories (3-2)
- Chad Cowan, Yukon (3-2)
- Doug Gee, Yukon (0-5)

Brian Wasnea, the defending champion did not qualify
