= Jody Sveistrup =

Canadian male curler

- Curler ♂

Team
- Curling club: Royal City CC, New Westminster, BC

Curling career
- Member Association: British Columbia
- Brier: 1 (2000)
- World Championship: 1 (2000)
Medal record
Curling
Representing Canada
World Championships
Gold medal – first place	2000 Glasgow
Representing British Columbia
Labatt Brier
Gold medal – first place	2000 Saskatoon

Jody Sveistrup (born 1969) is a Canadian curler.

He is a 2000 World Men's champion and a 2000 Labatt Brier champion.

== Awards ==
- British Columbia Sports Hall of Fame: inducted in 2002 with all of 2000 Greg McAulay team, Canadian and World champions

== Teams ==
Season	Skip	Third	Second	Lead	Alternate	Coach	Events
1994–95	Greg McAulay	Brian Gessner	Cary Sakiyama	Jody Sveistrup			
1999–00	Greg McAulay	Brent Pierce	Bryan Miki	Jody Sveistrup	Darin Fenton	Glen Pierce	Brier 2000 (gold); WCC 2000 (gold)
2000–01	Greg McAulay	Brent Pierce	Bryan Miki	Jody Sveistrup			
2001–02	Greg McAulay	Brent Pierce	Bryan Miki	Jody Sveistrup	Darin Fenton		COCT 2001 (7th)
2002–03	Greg McAulay	Grant Dezura	Mike Bradley	Jody Sveistrup			
