= Maxime Elmaleh =

Canadian curler (born 1969)

- Curler ♂
- Born: May 5, 1969 (age 57); Quebec City, Quebec

Team
- Curling club: CC Etchemin, Saint-Romuald, QC

Curling career
- Member Association: Quebec
- Brier: 4: (2000, 2002, 2005, 2006)
- World Championship: 1 (2006)
Medal record
Curling
Representing Canada
World Championships
Silver medal – second place	2006 Lowell
Representing Quebec
Tim Hortons Brier
Gold medal – first place	2006 Regina
Bronze medal – third place	2000 Saskatoon

Maxime Elmaleh (born May 5, 1969) is a Canadian curler and politician.

He is a 2006 World Men's silver medallist and a 2006 Tim Hortons Brier champion.

Elmaleh was elected to Quebec City Council in the 2025 Quebec City municipal election, representing Neufchâtel—Lebourgneuf District.

== Personal life ==
Maxime Elmaleh attended Cégep de Lévis-Lauzon and has a degree in business administration from Université Laval. He worked as accounting supervisor at CDPQ Inc.

At the time of the 2006 Brier, Elmaleh was living in Saint-Étienne-de-Lauzon, Quebec. He later moved to Quebec City's Lebourgneuf neighbourhood.

== Teams ==
=== Men's ===
Season	Skip	Third	Second	Lead	Alternate	Coach	Events
1998–99	Éric Sylvain	Maxime Elmaleh	François Roberge	Jean Gagnon			
1999–00	Éric Sylvain	Maxime Elmaleh	François Roberge	Jean Gagnon			
1999–00	François Roberge	Maxime Elmaleh	Éric Sylvain	Jean Gagnon	Michel St-Onge		Brier 2000 (bronze)
2000–01	François Roberge	Maxime Elmaleh	Éric Sylvain	Jean Gagnon			
2001–02	François Roberge	Maxime Elmaleh	Éric Sylvain	Jean Gagnon	Jean-Michel Ménard	Michel St-Onge	Brier 2002 (11th)
2003–04	Jean-Michel Ménard	François Roberge	Éric Sylvain	Maxime Elmaleh	Jean Gagnon		
2004–05	Jean-Michel Ménard	François Roberge	Éric Sylvain	Maxime Elmaleh	Jean Gagnon	Michel St-Onge	Brier 2005 (4th)
2005–06	Jean-Michel Ménard	François Roberge	Éric Sylvain	Maxime Elmaleh	Jean Gagnon	Michel St-Onge	Brier 2006 (gold); WCC 2006 (silver)
2006–07	Jean-Michel Ménard	François Roberge	Éric Sylvain	Maxime Elmaleh	Jean Gagnon (excluding CCC)		CCC 2006 (silver); CCup 2007 (9th)
2007–08	Francois Gagne	François Roberge	Maxime Elmaleh	Christian Bouchard			
2008–09	Guy Hemmings	Dwayne Fowler	Shawn Fowler	Maxime Elmaleh	François Roberge		
2009–10	Martin Ferland	François Roberge	Shawn Fowler	Maxime Elmaleh	Philippe Lemay		
2010–11	Martin Ferland	François Roberge	Shawn Fowler	Maxime Elmaleh			
2011–12	Martin Ferland	François Roberge	Shawn Fowler	Maxime Elmaleh			
2012–13	Martin Ferland	François Roberge	Shawn Fowler	Maxime Elmaleh			
2013–14	Martin Ferland	François Roberge	Shawn Fowler	Maxime Elmaleh			
2014–15	Ghyslain Richard	Maxime Elmaleh	William Dion	Miguel Bernard			
2016–17	Martin Ferland	François Roberge	Maxime Elmaleh	Jean Gagnon			
2017–18	Martin Ferland	François Roberge	Maxime Elmaleh	Jean Gagnon			
2018–19	François Roberge	Serge Reid	Maxime Elmaleh	Daniel Bédard			CSCC 2019 (5th)
2018–19	Steven Munroe	Maxime Elmaleh	Jasmin Gibeau	Philippe Brassard			
2019–20	Steven Munroe	Maxime Elmaleh	Philippe Brassard	Jean Gagnon			

=== Mixed ===
Season	Skip	Third	Second	Lead	Events
2015–16	Maxime Elmaleh	Roxane Perron	Jean Gagnon	Sonia Delisle	CMxCC 2016 (6th)
