= Jean Gagnon (curler) =

Canadian curler

- Curler ♂
- Born: October 22, 1970 (age 56); Gagnon, Quebec

Team
- Curling club: CC Etchemin, Saint-Romuald, QC
- Skip: Martin Ferland
- Third: Éric Sylvain
- Second: Jean Gagnon
- Lead: Maurice Cayouette

Curling career
- Member Association: Quebec
- Brier: 6 (2000, 2002, 2005, 2006, 2008, 2009)
- World Championship: 1 (2006)
Medal record
Men's curling
Representing Canada
World Championships
Silver medal – second place	2006 Lowell
Representing Quebec
Tim Hortons Brier
Gold medal – first place	2006 Regina
Bronze medal – third place	2000 Saskatoon

Jean Gagnon (born October 22, 1970, in Gagnon, Quebec) is a Canadian curler from Saint-Étienne, Quebec.

He is a 2006 World Men's silver medallist and a 2006 Tim Hortons Brier champion.

== Teams ==
=== Men's ===
Season	Skip	Third	Second	Lead	Alternate	Coach	Events
1998–99	Éric Sylvain	Maxime Elmaleh	François Roberge	Jean Gagnon			
1999–00	Éric Sylvain	Maxime Elmaleh	François Roberge	Jean Gagnon			
1999–00	François Roberge	Maxime Elmaleh	Éric Sylvain	Jean Gagnon	Michel St-Onge		Brier 2000 (bronze)
2000–01	François Roberge	Maxime Elmaleh	Éric Sylvain	Jean Gagnon			
2001–02	François Roberge	Maxime Elmaleh	Éric Sylvain	Jean Gagnon	Jean-Michel Ménard	Michel St-Onge	Brier 2002 (11th)
2003–04	Jean-Michel Ménard	François Roberge	Éric Sylvain	Maxime Elmaleh	Jean Gagnon		
2004–05	Jean-Michel Ménard	François Roberge	Éric Sylvain	Maxime Elmaleh	Jean Gagnon	Michel St-Onge	Brier 2005 (4th)
2005–06	Jean-Michel Ménard	François Roberge	Éric Sylvain	Maxime Elmaleh	Jean Gagnon	Michel St-Onge	Brier 2006 (gold); WCC 2006 (silver)
2006–07	Jean-Michel Ménard	François Roberge	Éric Sylvain	Maxime Elmaleh	Jean Gagnon		
2007–08	Jean-Michel Ménard	Martin Crête	Éric Sylvain	Jean Gagnon	Philippe Ménard	Michel St-Onge	Brier 2008 (7th)
2008–09	Jean-Michel Ménard	Martin Crête	Éric Sylvain	Jean Gagnon	Philippe Ménard	Michel St-Onge	Brier 2009 (5th)
2009–10	Jean-Michel Ménard	Martin Crête	Éric Sylvain	Jean Gagnon	Jean-Sébastien Roy		
2010–11	Jean-Michel Ménard	Martin Crête	Éric Sylvain	Jean Gagnon			
2016–17	Martin Ferland	François Roberge	Maxime Elmaleh	Jean Gagnon			
2017–18	Martin Ferland	François Roberge	Maxime Elmaleh	Jean Gagnon			
2019–20	Steven Munroe	Maxime Elmaleh	Philippe Brassard	Jean Gagnon			
2020–21	Martin Ferland	Éric Sylvain	Jean Gagnon	Maurice Cayouette			

=== Mixed ===
Season	Skip	Third	Second	Lead	Events
2015–16	Maxime Elmaleh	Roxane Perron	Jean Gagnon	Sonia Delisle	CMxCC 2016 (6th)

== Personal life ==
Jean Gagnon works as head of Technical Services, CDRI Lévis.
