= François Roberge =

Canadian curler (born 1968)

- Curler ♂
- Born: June 18, 1968 (age 58); Lévis, Quebec, Canada

Team
- Curling club: CC Etchemin, Saint-Romuald, QC

Curling career
- Member Association: Quebec
- Brier: 4: (2000, 2002, 2005, 2006)
- World Championship: 1 (2006)
Medal record
Curling
Representing Canada
World Championships
Silver medal – second place	2006 Lowell
Representing Quebec
Tim Hortons Brier
Gold medal – first place	2006 Regina
Bronze medal – third place	2000 Saskatoon

François Roberge (born June 18, 1968 in Saint-Romuald, Quebec) is a Canadian curler from Breakeyville, Quebec. He currently coaches the Laurie St-Georges rink.

He is a 2006 World Men's silver medallist and a 2006 Tim Hortons Brier champion.

== Personal life ==
Roberge is employed as a high performance consultant with Curling Québec and as an IT Director for Beneva Insurance. He is in a relationship with Isabelle Gagné, and has three children. Roberge attended Université Laval.

== Teams ==
Season	Skip	Third	Second	Lead	Alternate	Coach	Events
1998–99	Éric Sylvain	Maxime Elmaleh	François Roberge	Jean Gagnon			
1999–00	Éric Sylvain	Maxime Elmaleh	François Roberge	Jean Gagnon			
1999–00	François Roberge	Maxime Elmaleh	Éric Sylvain	Jean Gagnon	Michel St-Onge		Brier 2000 (bronze)
2000–01	François Roberge	Maxime Elmaleh	Éric Sylvain	Jean Gagnon			
2001–02	François Roberge	Maxime Elmaleh	Éric Sylvain	Jean Gagnon	Jean-Michel Ménard	Michel St-Onge	Brier 2002 (11th)
2003–04	Jean-Michel Ménard	François Roberge	Éric Sylvain	Maxime Elmaleh	Jean Gagnon		
2004–05	Jean-Michel Ménard	François Roberge	Éric Sylvain	Maxime Elmaleh	Jean Gagnon	Michel St-Onge	Brier 2005 (4th)
2005–06	Jean-Michel Ménard	François Roberge	Éric Sylvain	Maxime Elmaleh	Jean Gagnon	Michel St-Onge	Brier 2006 (gold); WCC 2006 (silver)
2006–07	Jean-Michel Ménard	François Roberge	Éric Sylvain	Maxime Elmaleh	Jean Gagnon (excluding CCC)		CCC 2006 (silver); CCup 2007 (9th)
2007–08	Francois Gagne	François Roberge	Maxime Elmaleh	Christian Bouchard			
2008–09	Guy Hemmings	Dwayne Fowler	Shawn Fowler	Maxime Elmaleh	François Roberge		
2009–10	Martin Ferland	François Roberge	Shawn Fowler	Maxime Elmaleh	Philippe Lemay		
2010–11	Martin Ferland	François Roberge	Shawn Fowler	Maxime Elmaleh			
2011–12	Martin Ferland	François Roberge	Shawn Fowler	Maxime Elmaleh			
2012–13	Martin Ferland	François Roberge	Shawn Fowler	Maxime Elmaleh			
2013–14	Martin Ferland	François Roberge	Shawn Fowler	Maxime Elmaleh			
2016–17	Martin Ferland	François Roberge	Maxime Elmaleh	Jean Gagnon			
2017–18	Martin Ferland	François Roberge	Maxime Elmaleh	Jean Gagnon			
2018–19	François Roberge	Serge Reid	Maxime Elmaleh	Daniel Bédard			CSCC 2019 (5th)
