= Jean-Michel Ménard =

Canadian curler (born 1976)

- Curler
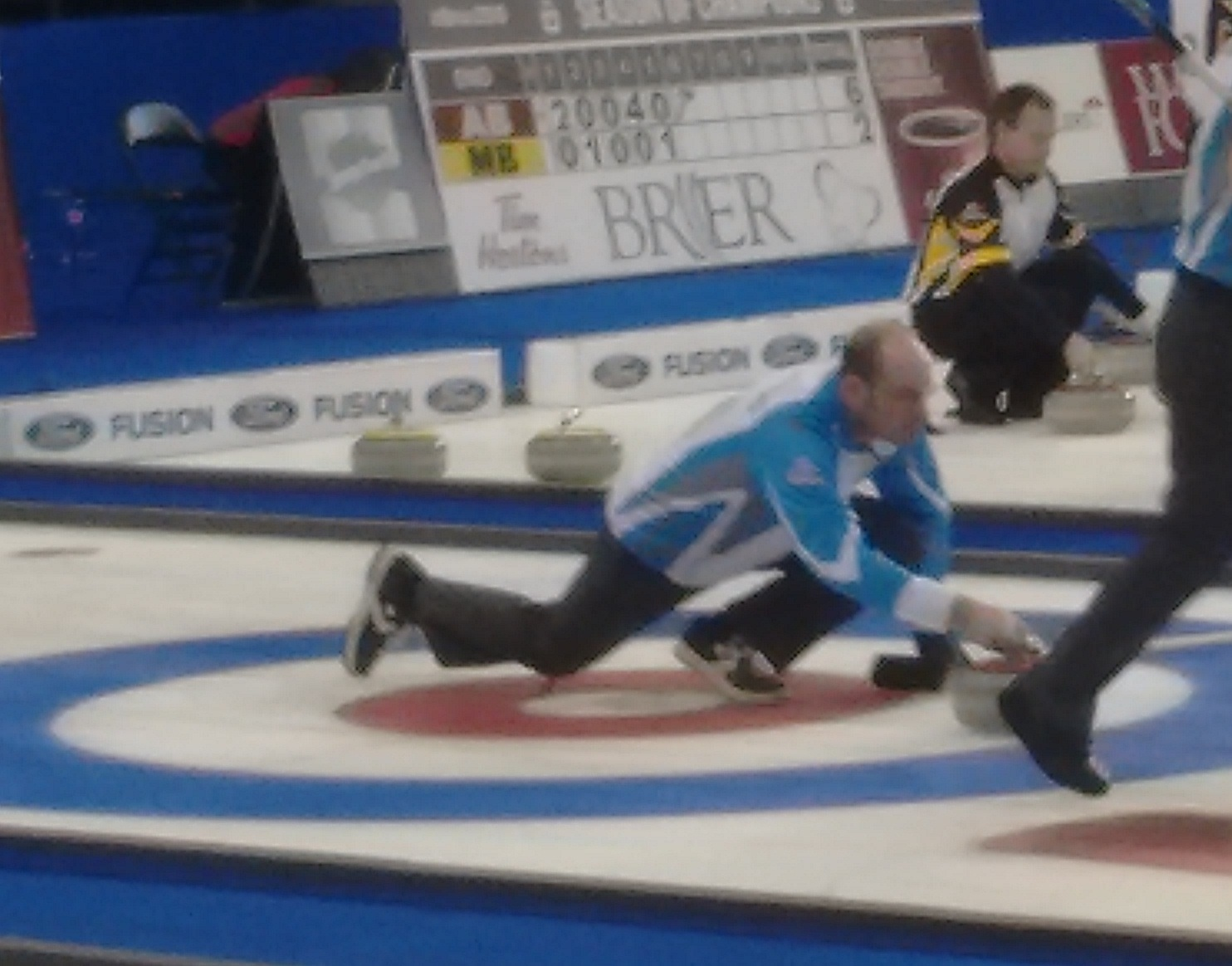
- Born: January 19, 1976 (age 50); Amos, Quebec, Canada

Team
- Curling club: Curling des Collines; Chelsea, QC

Curling career
- Member Association: Quebec
- Brier: 13 (2002, 2003, 2005, 2006, 2008, 2009, 2013, 2014, 2015, 2016, 2017, 2025, 2026)
- World Championship: 1 (2006)
- World Mixed Championship: 1 (2022)
- Top CTRS ranking: 8th (2004–05)
Medal record
Men's curling
Representing Canada
World Championships
Silver medal – second place	2006 Lowell
World Mixed Championship
Gold medal – first place	2022 Aberdeen
Representing Quebec
Tim Hortons Brier
Gold medal – first place	2006 Regina

Jean-Michel Ménard (born January 19, 1976) is a retired Canadian curler from Aylmer, Quebec. Ménard is notable for being the first Francophone skip from Quebec to win the Brier - Canada's national curling championship- which he did in 2006. In 2022 he won the World Mixed Curling Championship.

== Career ==
Ménard had a 5-7 record at the 1996 Canadian Junior Curling Championships, and would return to a national championships at the 2000 Canadian Mixed Curling Championship. He would return to the mixed in 2001, winning the tournament. Ménard found himself on the team of Guy Hemmings as his second in 2003, which they won the Quebec championships sending them to the 2003 Nokia Brier. At the Brier, they finished 6-5, just out of the playoffs.

In 2003, Ménard teamed up with François Roberge, Éric Sylvain and Maxime Elmaleh as skip. Roberge and Elmaleh had been teammates for 18 years before Ménard joined with them. The team won the Quebec championship that season, returning Ménard to the 2005 Tim Hortons Brier. There, he finished the round-robin with a 7-4 record, sending him to the playoffs. However, he lost in the 3-4 game to Nova Scotia's Shawn Adams.

Ménard returned once again to the Brier in 2006. His team finished the round robin in second place and an 8-3 record. In the playoffs they lost the 1-2 game, but went on to win the semi-final against Team Nova Scotia skipped by Mark Dacey in a lacklustre game. In the final, against Ontario's Glenn Howard team, Ménard and his Quebec foursome played a much better game, claiming victory- the first ever for a full Francophone born team and the second ever for a Quebec team.

Ménard's victory at the Brier qualified him for the 2006 World Men's Curling Championship in Lowell, Massachusetts. At the Worlds, Ménard's team went all the way to the finals, but lost to Team Scotland (skipped by David Murdoch) in the final.

In 2007, Ménard lost the provincial championship to Pierre Charette, ending his bid to repeat as defending Brier champions. Following the season, the team broke up with Roberge being replaced at third with Martin Crête and Elmaleh being replaced at lead by Jean Gagnon.

In 2008, Ménard and his new team returned to the Brier, where he finished with a disappointing 4-7 record. He returned again in 2009 where he finished with a 7-4 record, but lost to Manitoba's Jeff Stoughton in a tie-breaker. Ménard failed to qualify for the 2010 Brier, losing out in the semi-final of the 2010 Quebec Men's Provincial Curling Championship to Martin Ferland. He missed out on the Brier again in 2011, losing in the 2011 Quebec Men's Provincial Curling Championship final to François Gagné. Ménard missed out on the Brier for the third straight year when he lost in the semi-final of the 2012 Quebec Men's Provincial Curling Championship to Robert Desjardins. Ménard finally returned to the Brier when he won the 2013 Quebec Men's Provincial Curling Championship. At the 2013 Tim Hortons Brier, he had an average week, finishing the event with a 6-5 record. Ménard won another provincial title in 2014, sending his rink to the 2014 Tim Hortons Brier. He led his team to a strong 4th-place performance, losing to Manitoba's Jeff Stoughton in the bronze medal game.

Ménard won the 2015 Quebec Men's Provincial Curling Championship, but had less success at the 2015 Tim Hortons Brier, going 6–5. He won another Quebec championship in 2016, and led Quebec to a 4–7 record at the 2016 Tim Hortons Brier. He won a final Quebec championship in 2017, and led his province to a 7–4 record at the 2017 Tim Hortons Brier.

Ménard stepped away from competitive curling in 2017, but returned in 2021 to win his second Canadian Mixed Championship, with teammates Marie-France Larouche, Ian Belleau and wife Annie Lemay. In 2022 he won the World Mixed Curling Championship for Canada, defeating host Scotland 7-4 in Aberdeen, Scotland.

In 2024, it was announced that Ménard would be returning to competitive curling for the 2024–25 season as the third for Team Félix Asselin. Ménard, halfway through the season would begin skipping the team, with Asselin continuing to throw fourth stones. Ménard would win the 2025 Quebec Tankard, qualifying them to represent Quebec at the 2025 Montana's Brier. At the Brier, the team finished 4–4, missing out on the playoffs.

Team Ménard would start the 2025–26 curling season at the 2025 Canadian Olympic Curling Pre-Trials, where they would finish with a 4–3 record, narrowly missing out on the playoffs. Ménard would again win the 2026 Quebec Tankard and represent Quebec at the 2026 Montana's Brier. Prior to the Brier, Ménard announced that he would be retiring at the end of the season. At his final Brier, Team Ménard finished 5–3, missing out on the playoffs due to the last-stone-draw tiebreaker.

== Personal life ==
Ménard grew up in Amos, Quebec and was introduced to curling by his parents, Robert Ménard and Lucie Gagné. His siblings all curled as well, including teammate Philippe. He moved to Gatineau, Quebec in 2001. While living in the Gatineau suburb of Aylmer and playing in leagues across the river in Ottawa, Ontario at the Ottawa Curling Club and the Rideau Curling Club, he also represented the Victoria Curling Club in Sainte-Foy, Quebec and later in his career, the Club de Curling Etchemin in Saint-Romuald, Quebec.

Ménard is married to eight-time (as of 2016) provincial women's curling champion Annie Lemay, and they have two children. He works as a human resources manager for the Government of Canada. At the time of the 2006 Brier, he was working as a human resources consultant for Bowater Produits Forestiers du Canada.
