= Greg McAulay =

Canadian curler

- Curler
- Born: January 2, 1960 (age 66); Winnipeg, Manitoba, Canada

Curling career
- Brier: 2 (1998, 2000)
- World Championship: 1 (2000)
Medal record
Men's curling
Representing British Columbia
Labatt Brier
Gold medal – first place	2000 Saskatoon
Representing Canada
World Curling Championships
Gold medal – first place	2000 Glasgow

Gregory McAulay (born January 2, 1960) is a Canadian World champion curler from Richmond, British Columbia.

== Career ==
McAulay has been to two Briers in his career. At the 1998 Labatt Brier, he skipped his British Columbia team to a 7-4 record in the round robin before losing to Saskatchewan (skipped by Rod Montgomery) in a tie-breaker.

In the 2000 Labatt Brier, his team of himself, Brent Pierce, Bryan Miki and Jody Sveistrup finished with an impressive 9-2 record to finish in first place after the round robin. In the playoffs, he defeated Russ Howard's New Brunswick rink twice to capture his only Brier title.

This Brier win qualified McAulay for the 2000 Ford World Curling Championships, where he would skip the Canadian team. At the Worlds, he finished with an 8-1 record. He defeated Craig Brown's American rink in the semi-final, then Peja Lindholm's Swedish rink in the final.

== Awards ==
- British Columbia Sports Hall of Fame: inducted in 2002 with all of 2000 Greg McAulay team, Canadian and World champions

== Personal life ==
McAulay's niece is Manitoba curler Kerri Einarson.
