= Shawn Adams =

Canadian curler

- Curler
- Born: April 4, 1974 (age 52); Bridgewater, Nova Scotia, Canada

Curling career
- Brier: 4 (2000, 2002, 2005, 2011)
Medal record
Men's curling
Representing Nova Scotia
Tim Hortons Brier
Silver medal – second place	2005 Edmonton

Shawn Adams (born April 4, 1974, in Bridgewater, Nova Scotia) is a Canadian curler from Upper Tantallon, Nova Scotia.

== Career ==
Adams rose to curling prominence being runner-up at the 1992 Canadian Junior Curling Championships, and then the next year, won the 1993 Canadian Junior Curling Championships, however he was stripped of the championship because of alcohol violations after the victory.

7 years later Adams came back to the scene winning the Nova Scotia championships for the right to go to the 2000 Labatt Brier, where he finished 3–8. Two years later, at the 2002 Nokia Brier he improved on that record with a 6–5 record. Finally, at the 2005 Tim Hortons Brier, Adams would finish the round-robin with an 8–3 record earning him a berth in the playoffs. In the playoffs, Adams defeated Quebec's Jean-Michel Menard in the 3–4 game, then he defeated Manitoba's Randy Dutiaume in the semi-final before losing to Randy Ferbey and Alberta in the final. Adams won his final Nova Scotia championship in 2011, and went 5–6 at the 2011 Tim Hortons Brier.

In 2011, Adams moved to Newfoundland and Labrador. In 2013, he played in his only provincial championship in the province. He would later move back to Nova Scotia.

== Grand Slam record ==
Key
C	Champion
F	Lost in Final
SF	Lost in Semifinal
QF	Lost in Quarterfinals
R16	Lost in the round of 16
Q	Did not advance to playoffs
T2	Played in Tier 2 event
DNP	Did not participate in event
N/A	Not a Grand Slam event that season

Event	2005–06	2006–07	2007–08	2008–09	2009–10	2010–11	2011–12	2012–13	2013–14	2014–15	2015–16
Masters	SF	Q	Q	Q	DNP	DNP	DNP	DNP	DNP	DNP	Q
Canadian Open	DNP	DNP	F	DNP	DNP	DNP	DNP	DNP	DNP	DNP	DNP
The National	Q	QF	Q	Q	DNP	DNP	DNP	DNP	DNP	DNP	DNP
Players'	DNP	DNP	Q	DNP	DNP	DNP	DNP	DNP	DNP	DNP	DNP
