= Éric Sylvain =

Canadian curler

- Curler
- Born: June 16, 1971 (age 55); Thetford Mines, Quebec, Canada

Team
- Curling club: CC Etchemin, Saint-Romuald CC
- Skip: Martin Ferland
- Third: Éric Sylvain
- Second: Jean Gagnon
- Lead: Maurice Cayouette

Curling career
- Member Association: Quebec
- Brier: 12 (2000, 2002, 2005, 2006, 2008, 2009, 2013, 2014, 2015, 2016, 2017, 2019)
- Top CTRS ranking: 8th (2004–05)
Medal record
Men's curling
Representing Canada
World Curling Championships
Silver medal – second place	2006 Lowell
Representing Quebec
Tim Hortons Brier
Gold medal – first place	2006 Regina
Bronze medal – third place	2000 Saskatoon

Éric Sylvain (born June 16, 1971) is a Canadian curler from Lévis, Quebec. He was the long time second for Jean-Michel Ménard from 2003 to 2018.

Sylvain joined up with Ménard in 2003, and qualified for his first Brier in 2005 as a member of Team Quebec. They lost in the 3-4 game to Nova Scotia (Shawn Adams, skip).

In 2006, they qualified for the Brier, this time winning the title when they defeated Ontario (Glenn Howard) in the final. The team became the first francophone team from Quebec to win the Brier. This qualified them to represent Team Canada at the 2006 World Men's Curling Championship. The lost in the final to Scotland (David Murdoch).

The team failed to qualify for the 2007 Brier- losing to Pierre Charette in the provincial final. The team broke up that year, but Sylvain stuck with Ménard. They won the 2008 provincial final, qualifying them for the 2008 Tim Hortons Brier, but the new team failed to make the playoffs.

== Personal life ==
Sylvain works as a general manager at the Saint-Michel Golf Club. He is married to fellow curler Julie Rainville. He currently coaches the Julien Tremblay rink.
