= Bruce Korte =

Canadian curler (born 1967)

- Curler
- Born: July 22, 1967 (age 59); Muenster, Saskatchewan, Canada

Curling career
- Brier: 3 (2000, 2004, 2010)
- Top CTRS ranking: 15th (2005–06)
- Grand Slam victories: 1 (2002 The National)
Medal record
Men's curling
Representing Canada
World Senior Championships
Bronze medal – third place	2026 Geneva

Bruce Korte (born July 22, 1967 in Muenster, Saskatchewan) is a Canadian curler from Saskatoon. He is a three-time SaskTel Tankard provincial champion.

As a junior, Korte's top accomplishment was losing the 1984 men's provincial junior final.

Korte has won three provincial championships, in 2000, 2004 and 2010. At the 2000 Labatt Brier, Korte's Saskatchewan rink finished 5–6. In 2004, Korte downed Brad Heidt in the Saskatchewan final. At the 2004 Nokia Brier, his rink finished 5-6 once again. At the 2010 Tim Hortons Brier, he played third for his long-time third Darrell McKee and the team finished the event with a 4–7 record.

In 2002, Korte skipped his rink to his first and only Grand Slam of Curling title, winning the Masters of Curling over Jeff Stoughton. Korte has been a skip for almost his entire career except for the period between 2009 and 2011 when he threw third stones for McKee. McKee left the team in 2011.

Korte skipped team Saskatchewan at the 2016 Canadian Mixed Curling Championship, making it all the way to the final before losing to Alberta. He skipped Saskatchewan again at the 2018 Canadian Mixed Curling Championship, but missed qualifying for the championship pool.

Korte has also won two Canadian Senior Championships, skipping Saskatchewan to wins at the 2019 and 2025 Canadian Senior Curling Championships.

== Personal life ==
Korte is married to Marje and has three daughters. He worked as CurlSask's event manager.

== Grand Slam record ==
Key
C	Champion
F	Lost in Final
SF	Lost in Semifinal
QF	Lost in Quarterfinals
R16	Lost in the round of 16
Q	Did not advance to playoffs
T2	Played in Tier 2 event
DNP	Did not participate in event
N/A	Not a Grand Slam event that season

Event	2001–02	2002–03	2003–04	2004–05	2005–06	2006–07	2007–08	2008–09	2009–10	2010–11	2011–12	2012–13	2013–14	2014–15	2015–16	2016–17
Masters / World Cup	C	Q	DNP	SF	DNP	DNP	DNP	DNP	DNP	DNP	DNP	DNP	DNP	DNP	DNP	DNP
Tour Challenge	—N/a														DNP	DNP
The National	Q	Q	Q	DNP	DNP	DNP	DNP	DNP	DNP	DNP	DNP	DNP	DNP	DNP	DNP	DNP
Canadian Open	Q	Q	Q	DNP	QF	DNP	DNP	DNP	DNP	DNP	DNP	DNP	DNP	DNP	DNP	Q
Elite 10	—N/a													DNP	DNP	DNP
Players'	Q	Q	DNP	DNP	Q	QF	DNP	DNP	DNP	DNP	DNP	DNP	DNP	DNP	DNP	DNP
Champions Cup	—N/a														DNP	DNP
