= 2003 Canadian Open (curling) =

Grand Slam of Curling event

The 2003 Canadian Open curling men's Grand Slam tournament was held November 6–9, 2003 at the Keystone Centre in Brandon, Manitoba.

The total purse for the event was $100,000. The tournament format was a triple knock out with an 8 team playoff. The playoffs were televised on Rogers Sportsnet.

Glen Despins of Regina, Saskatchewan won his lone career grand slam event, earning $30,000 for his team.

== Teams ==
The teams were as follows:

Skip	Third	Second	Lead	Locale
Dave Boehmer	Pat Spiring	Richard Daneault	Don Harvey	Petersfield, Manitoba
Tom Brewster	Graeme Connal	Ron Brewster	Colin Campbell	Glasgow, Scotland
Kerry Burtnyk	Ken Tresoor	Rob Fowler	Keith Fenton	Winnipeg, Manitoba
Glen Despins	Rod Montgomery	Phillip Germain	Dwayne Mihalicz	Regina, Saskatchewan
Brad Heidt	Jason Jacobson	Mike Jantzen	Steve Laycock	Kerrobert, Saskatchewan
Guy Hemmings	Martin Ferland	Pierre Charette	Dale Ness	Saint-Aime, Quebec
Glenn Howard	Richard Hart	Collin Mitchell	Jason Mitchell	Coldwater, Ontario
Bruce Korte	Clint Dieno	Roger Korte	Rory Golanowski	Saskatoon, Saskatchewan
Kevin Martin	Don Walchuk	Carter Rycroft	Don Bartlett	Edmonton, Alberta
Heath McCormick	Brent Laing	Craig Savill	Shawn Harris	Sarnia, Ontario
Wayne Middaugh	Graeme McCarrel	Joe Frans	Scott Bailey	Midland, Ontario
Kevin Park	Dale Duguid	Scott Park	Patrick McCallum	Edmonton, Alberta
Vic Peters	Ryan Fry	Chris Neufeld	Denni Neufeld	Winnipeg, Manitoba
Paul Pustovar	Mike Fraboni	Geoff Goodland	Richard Maskel	(United States) Hibbing, Minnesota
Ralph Stöckli	Claudio Pescia	Pascal Sieber	Simon Strübin	Neuenkirch, Switzerland
Jeff Stoughton	Jon Mead	Garry Vandenberghe	Steve Gould	Winnipeg, Manitoba

== Knockout brackets ==
=== A Event ===
Scores:

A Event		Semifinals		Qualifier 1
(Alberta) Kevin Martin	8
(United States) Paul Pustovar	4	(Alberta) Kevin Martin	7
(Saskatchewan) Glen Despins	8	(Saskatchewan) Glen Despins	4
(Ontario) Heath McCormick	2			(Alberta) Kevin Martin	5
(Manitoba) Dave Boehmer	11			(Manitoba) Dave Boehmer	6
(Manitoba) Vic Peters	7	(Manitoba) Dave Boehmer	6
(Ontario) Glenn Howard	5	(Saskatchewan) Brad Heidt	0
(Saskatchewan) Brad Heidt	6

A Event		Semifinals		Qualifier 2
(Manitoba) Jeff Stoughton	7
(Switzerland) Ralph Stöckli	5	(Manitoba) Jeff Stoughton	9
(Quebec) Guy Hemmings	4	(Alberta) Kevin Park	7
(Alberta) Kevin Park	6			(Manitoba) Jeff Stoughton	5
(Manitoba) Kerry Burtnyk	8			(Scotland) Tom Brewster	4
(Saskatchewan) Bruce Korte	7	(Manitoba) Kerry Burtnyk	2
(Ontario) Wayne Middaugh	3	(Scotland) Tom Brewster	7
(Scotland) Tom Brewster	4

=== B Event ===
Scores:

B Event		Semifinals		Qualifier 3
(United States) Paul Pustovar	4
(Ontario) Heath McCormick	10	(Saskatchewan) Brad Heidt	5
		(Ontario) Heath McCormick	3
				(Saskatchewan) Brad Heidt	6
				(Scotland) Tom Brewster	7

B Event
(Manitoba) Vic Peters	2
(Ontario) Glenn Howard	8
(Switzerland) Ralph Stöckli	8
(Quebec) Guy Hemmings	4

Semifinals
(Saskatchewan) Glen Despins	4
(Ontario) Glenn Howard	10
(Switzerland) Ralph Stöckli	0
(Manitoba) Kerry Burtnyk	9

Qualifier 4
(Ontario) Glenn Howard	4
(Manitoba) Kerry Burtnyk	7

B Event		Semifinals		Qualifier 5
(Saskatchewan) Bruce Korte	6
(Ontario) Wayne Middaugh	9	(Ontario) Wayne Middaugh	6
		(Alberta) Kevin Park	4
				(Alberta) Kevin Martin	7
				(Ontario) Wayne Middaugh	8

=== C Event ===
Scores:

C Event		Semifinals		Qualifier 6
(United States) Paul Pustovar	5
(Manitoba) Vic Peters	8	(Switzerland) Ralph Stöckli	5
		(Manitoba) Vic Peters	8
				(Manitoba) Vic Peters	3
				(Alberta) Kevin Martin	7

C Event		Semifinals		Qualifier 7
(Quebec) Guy Hemmings	7
(Saskatchewan) Bruce Korte	8	(Saskatchewan) Bruce Korte	4
		(Saskatchewan) Glen Despins	8
				(Saskatchewan) Brad Heidt	5
				(Saskatchewan) Glen Despins	8

C Event		Qualifier 8
(Ontario) Heath McCormick	2
(Alberta) Kevin Park	8	(Ontario) Glenn Howard	9
		(Alberta) Kevin Park	10

== Playoffs ==
The playoff bracket was as follows:

Quarterfinals
(Saskatchewan) Glen Despins	7
(Ontario) Wayne Middaugh	4
(Alberta) Kevin Martin	6
(Manitoba) Jeff Stoughton	4
(Manitoba) Dave Boehmer	6
(Alberta) Kevin Park	3
(Manitoba) Kerry Burtnyk	8
(Scotland) Tom Brewster	7

Semifinals
(Saskatchewan) Glen Despins	12
(Alberta) Kevin Martin	5
(Manitoba) Dave Boehmer	10
(Manitoba) Kerry Burtnyk	4

Gold Medal Game
(Saskatchewan) Glen Despins	8
(Manitoba) Dave Boehmer	7

Third Place Game
(Alberta) Kevin Martin	7
(Manitoba) Kerry Burtnyk	4
