= Kevin Park =

Canadian curler

- Curler
- Born: September 2, 1964 (age 62); Hythe, Alberta

Team
- Curling club: Strathmore CC, Strathmore, AB
- Skip: Kevin Park
- Third: Robert Collins
- Second: Scott Garnett
- Lead: Ben Savage

Curling career
- Brier: 5 (1991, 1992, 1995, 2009, 2010)
- World Championship: 1 (1991)
- Olympic: 1 (1992 (demonstration))
- Top CTRS ranking: 5th (2009–10)
Medal record
Men's curling
Representing Canada
World Curling Championships
| Silver medal – second place | 1991 Winnipeg |
Representing Alberta
Tim Hortons Brier
| Gold medal – first place | 1991 Hamilton |
| Bronze medal – third place | 1992 Regina |
| Bronze medal – third place | 1995 Halifax |
Representing Manitoba
Tim Hortons Brier
| Silver medal – second place | 2009 Calgary |
Canadian Olympic Curling Trials
| Bronze medal – third place | 2009 Edmonton |

Kevin Park (born September 2, 1964, in Hythe, Alberta) is a Canadian curler from Edmonton, Alberta.

== Career ==
=== Early career ===
Park was a two time provincial junior champion in his native Alberta, winning in 1983 and 1984. He led Alberta to an 8–5 finish at the 1983 Canadian Junior Men's Curling Championship, and a 6–5 record at the 1984 Canadian Junior Men's Curling Championship.

Park played third for Kevin Martin from 1990 to 1995. During this time, he won the Brier in 1991 and a silver medal at the World Curling Championships. He also played for Canada at the 1992 Winter Olympics where curling was a demonstration sport - the team finished fourth. Park would also play in the 1992 and 1995 Briers with Martin.

=== 1995-2008 ===
After playing for Martin, Park formed his own team, which had some success on the World Curling Tour, and involved trips to the 1997 Canadian Olympic Curling Trials, and 2001 Olympic Trials. He placed second on the World Curling Tour money list in 1996 and placed third in 1997. The 1995–96 season included victories at the Merchant Cash Spiel and the Canadian North Arctic Briar. As a skip, Park wouldn't win another major bonspiel until the Pointoptical Curling Classic in 2000. In 2002 he won the Wheat City Curling Classic and the Norris Bros. Roaming Buffalo Classic. In 2003 he won the Whites Drug Store Classic, playing third for Doran Johnson. In 2007, he won the John Shea Insurance Canada Cup Qualifier, subbing in for Blake MacDonald as third for Kevin Koe's rink. Park played at the subsequent 2008 Canada Cup of Curling, playing third for Kevin Martin instead (subbing for an injured John Morris).

=== 2008-2011 ===
Park would then join with Jeff Stoughton's Winnipeg rink in 2008. He made it to his fourth Brier, in 2009 playing for Stoughton. He came under controversy from curling traditionalists for not actually living in Manitoba, the province he represented at the 2009 and 2010 Tim Hortons Brier. However, to meet residence requirements, Park would share an apartment in Winnipeg with Pat McCallum where he resides September through March, which allowed him to participate. In April 2010, Park left the team. It was announced later in the month that he has decided to remain curling in Manitoba for the 2010–11 season, except this time, forming his own team. Park skipped his own team, consisting of Pat McCallum at lead, Taren Gesell at second, and Chris Galbraith at third. His new team had a decent season, reaching the semi-finals of two World Curling Tour events.

=== 2011-present ===
Park returned to Edmonton in 2011 to form a new team, consisting of Shane Park, Aaron Sluchinski and Justin Sluchinski. He joined the Robert Schlender rink in 2014.

== Personal life ==
Park is a website database manager for Delvi Data.

His daughter is a curler and coach Kalynn Park, 2015 Canadian mixed doubles curling champion curler.

== Grand Slam record ==
Key
| C | Champion |
| F | Lost in Final |
| SF | Lost in Semifinal |
| QF | Lost in Quarterfinals |
| R16 | Lost in the round of 16 |
| Q | Did not advance to playoffs |
| T2 | Played in Tier 2 event |
| DNP | Did not participate in event |
| N/A | Not a Grand Slam event that season |

| Event | 2001–02 | 2002–03 | 2003–04 | 2004–05 | 2005–06 | 2006–07 | 2007–08 | 2008–09 | 2009–10 | 2010–11 |
|---|---|---|---|---|---|---|---|---|---|---|
| Masters | Q | Q | QF | SF | DNP | DNP | DNP | SF | DNP | Q |
| The National | QF | Q | QF | DNP | DNP | DNP | DNP | QF | QF | Q |
| Canadian Open | Q | Q | QF | DNP | DNP | DNP | DNP | SF | QF | DNP |
| Players' Championships | Q | SF | Q | DNP | DNP | F | DNP | QF | SF | DNP |
