= 2002 Players' Championship =

Grand Slam of Curling event

2002 WCT Players' Championship
- Host city: Strathroy, Ontario
- Arena: Strathroy Gemini Sportsplex
- Dates: February 27–March 3, 2002
- Winner: (Ontario) Team Middaugh
- Curling club: St. George's G&CC
- Skip: Wayne Middaugh
- Third: Graeme McCarrel
- Second: Ian Tetley
- Lead: Scott Bailey
- Finalist: (Manitoba) Vic Peters

The 2002 WCT Players' Championship was held February 27 to March 3 at the Strathroy Gemini Sportsplex in Strathroy, Ontario. It was the final Grand Slam event of the 2001-02 World Curling Tour season.

The total purse for the event was $150,000. The winning rink would be the Wayne Middaugh team from Midland, Ontario which beat Winnipeg's Vic Peters in the final.

== Teams entered ==
- (Manitoba) Dave Boehmer
- (Manitoba) Kerry Burtnyk
- (Quebec) Pierre Charette
- (Saskatchewan) Glen Despins
- (British Columbia) Bert Gretzinger
- (Alberta) Warren Hassall
- (Ontario) Glenn Howard
- (Switzerland) Stefan Karnusian
- (Saskatchewan) Bruce Korte
- (Manitoba) Allan Lyburn
- (Manitoba) William Lyburn
- (Alberta) Kevin Martin
- (British Columbia) Greg McAulay
- (Ontario) Chad McMullan
- (Ontario) Wayne Middaugh
- (Ontario) Rich Moffatt
- (Scotland) David Mundell
- (Alberta) Kevin Park
- (Manitoba) Vic Peters
- (Switzerland) Ralph Stöckli
- (Manitoba) Jeff Stoughton

== Playoffs ==
Quarterfinals
(Manitoba) Jeff Stoughton	7
(Manitoba) Kerry Burtnyk	6
(Manitoba) Vic Peters	6
(Ontario) Glenn Howard	5
(Alberta) Kevin Martin	9
(British Columbia) Greg McAulay	3
(Saskatchewan) Glen Despins	2
(Ontario) Wayne Middaugh	4

Semifinals
(Manitoba) Jeff Stoughton	7
(Manitoba) Vic Peters	8
(Alberta) Kevin Martin	8
(Ontario) Wayne Middaugh	9

Finals
(Manitoba) Vic Peters	4
(Ontario) Wayne Middaugh	6
