= Wayne Middaugh =

Canadian curler

- Curler
- Born: September 20, 1967 (age 59); Brampton, Ontario, Canada

Curling career
- Member Association: Ontario
- Brier: 10 (1991, 1992, 1993, 1994, 1998, 2001, 2005, 2012, 2013, 2021)
- Top CTRS ranking: 2nd (2003–04)
- Grand Slam victories: 11: Masters/World Cup (Dec 2003, 2011, 2013); Canadian Open (2001, 2012); The National (2005, 2008, 2012, 2014); Players (2002, 2013)
Medal record
Men's curling
Representing Canada
World Curling Championships
Gold medal – first place	1993 Geneva
Gold medal – first place	1998 Kamloops
Gold medal – first place	2012 Basel
Representing Ontario
Tim Hortons Brier
Gold medal – first place	1993 Ottawa
Gold medal – first place	1998 Winnipeg
Gold medal – first place	2012 Saskatoon
Silver medal – second place	1992 Regina
Silver medal – second place	1994 Red Deer
Bronze medal – third place	2001 Ottawa
Bronze medal – third place	2013 Edmonton

Robert Wayne Middaugh (born September 20, 1967) is a Canadian curler. Born in Brampton, Ontario, Middaugh resides in Victoria Harbour, Ontario. He is the only player to have won the Canadian Men's Curling Championship (known as the Brier) at three different positions: skip (1998), third (2012), and second (1993). He was inducted into the Canadian Curling Hall of Fame in 2020. He currently coaches the Anna Hasselborg rink from Sweden.

== Career ==
Middaugh is a three-time world champion, once as second for Russ Howard in 1993, as a skip in 1998, and as third for Glenn Howard in 2012. He has competed in ten Briers — in 1991, 1992, 1993, and 1994 as Russ Howard's second, in 1998, 2001, 2005 and 2021 as a skip, and in 2012 and 2013 as third on the Glenn Howard rink — winning the title in 1993, 1998 and 2012. On top of this, Middaugh has won seven TSN Skins Games, was the World Curling Tour Money leader for three seasons and has won five World Curling Tour Players' Championships (1995, 1999, 2001, 2002 and 2013).

In March 2007, Jon Mead was announced as the Middaugh team's replacement for Wayne's cousin Peter Corner at the third position. He left the team in April 2010 to rejoin with his former skip Jeff Stoughton.

Following the retirement of Richard Hart from the Glenn Howard rink, Howard announced that Middaugh would replace Hart as his third. Middaugh would have immediate success with his new team, qualifying for the 2012 Tim Hortons Brier where the rink lost only one game during the event, and defeated Alberta's Kevin Koe in the final. Middaugh became the first curler to win the Brier at three different positions. In addition to the 2012 title, Middaugh was the winner of the annual Ford Hot Shots skills and shot-making competition that precedes the start of round-robin play. The team represented Ontario again at the 2013 Tim Hortons Brier, where they won a bronze medal.

Middaugh left the Howard rink in 2014, and announced his retirement from competitive curling. However he returned in time to play in the Challenge Round to qualify for the 2015 Ontario Tankard, being added as skip to Peter Corner's rink. He returned to the Howard rink for the 2015–16 curling season before breaking his leg in a skiing accident partway though the season. The team qualified for the 2016 Tim Hortons Brier, but due to the injury Middaugh was relegated to coaching the team.

Middaugh's accident resulted in his leg being broken in 11 places, two years of recovery, and multiple surgeries. It also resulted in him getting a "titanium leg". This forced him to cut his curling career short, and he moved to the world of coaching, joining the 2018 Olympic gold medallist Anna Hasselborg rink as their coach. During the 2020–21 curling season, Middaugh's former skip Glenn Howard got into an accident of his own, while snowmobiling. Due to the accident, Middaugh joined the team to play in the 2021 Tim Hortons Brier, replacing Howard as skip. Despite his prior injury and time away from the game, Middaugh led the team to an 8–4 record, finishing in 5th place overall. After the event, Middaugh called it a "one off", stating that he could not "play a long event again".

== Personal life ==
Middaugh works as the general manager at the Port Carling Golf & Country Club and is also the PGA of Canada golf pro. He is married to former Ontario women's champion Sherry Middaugh, and has two children.

== Career statistics ==
=== Grand Slam record ===
Key
C	Champion
F	Lost in Final
SF	Lost in Semifinal
QF	Lost in Quarterfinals
R16	Lost in the round of 16
Q	Did not advance to playoffs
T2	Played in Tier 2 event
DNP	Did not participate in event
N/A	Not a Grand Slam event that season

Event	2001–02	2002–03	2003–04	2004–05	2005–06	2006–07	2007–08	2008–09	2009–10	2010–11	2011–12	2012–13	2013–14	2014–15	2015–16	2016–17	2017–18	2018–19	2019–20	2020–21	2021–22	2022–23	2023–24	2024–25	2025–26
Masters	SF	SF	C	DNP	QF	QF	SF	Q	DNP	Q	C	Q	C	DNP	Q	DNP	DNP	DNP	DNP	N/A	DNP	DNP	DNP	DNP	DNP
The National	Q	Q	SF	Q	C	DNP	SF	C	QF	SF	C	Q	C	DNP	SF	DNP	DNP	DNP	DNP	N/A	DNP	DNP	DNP	DNP	Q
Canadian Open	C	QF	QF	Q	DNP	QF	SF	Q	Q	Q	SF	C	SF	DNP	Q	DNP	DNP	DNP	DNP	N/A	DNP	DNP	DNP	DNP	DNP
Players'	C	Q	Q	Q	Q	Q	QF	Q	DNP	DNP	F	C	Q	SF (Note: Middaugh spared in the playoffs for the Brendan Bottcher rink, as Bottcher had to take an exam.)	DNP	DNP	DNP	DNP	N/A	DNP	Q (Note: Middaugh spared for Glenn Howard as Howard sustained a knee injury.)	DNP	DNP	DNP	DNP

=== Teams ===
Season	Skip	Third	Second	Lead
1986–87	Wayne Middaugh	Peter Corner	Dave Hannon	Todd Macklin
1989–90	Russ Howard	Glenn Howard	Wayne Middaugh	Peter Corner
1990–91	Russ Howard	Glenn Howard	Wayne Middaugh	Peter Corner
1991–92	Russ Howard	Glenn Howard	Wayne Middaugh	Peter Corner
1992–93	Russ Howard	Glenn Howard	Wayne Middaugh	Peter Corner
1993–94	Russ Howard	Glenn Howard	Wayne Middaugh	Peter Corner
1994–95	Wayne Middaugh	Graeme McCarrel	Ian Tetley	Scott Bailey
1995–96	Wayne Middaugh	Graeme McCarrel	Ian Tetley	Scott Bailey
1996–97	Wayne Middaugh	Graeme McCarrel	Ian Tetley	Scott Bailey
1997–98	Wayne Middaugh	Graeme McCarrel	Ian Tetley	Scott Bailey
1998–99	Wayne Middaugh	Graeme McCarrel	Ian Tetley	Scott Bailey
1999–00	Wayne Middaugh	Graeme McCarrel	Ian Tetley	Scott Bailey
2000–01	Wayne Middaugh	Graeme McCarrel	Ian Tetley	Scott Bailey
2001–02	Wayne Middaugh	Graeme McCarrel	Ian Tetley	Scott Bailey
2002–03	Wayne Middaugh	Graeme McCarrel	Ian Tetley	Scott Bailey
2003–04	Wayne Middaugh	Graeme McCarrel	Joe Frans	Scott Bailey
2004–05	Wayne Middaugh	Graeme McCarrel	Joe Frans	Scott Bailey
2005–06	Wayne Middaugh	Peter Corner	Phil Loevenmark	Scott Bailey
2006–07	Wayne Middaugh	Peter Corner	Ian Tetley	Scott Bailey
2007–08	Wayne Middaugh	Jon Mead	John Epping	Scott Bailey
2008–09	Wayne Middaugh	Jon Mead	John Epping	Scott Bailey
2009–10	Wayne Middaugh	Jon Mead	John Epping	Scott Bailey
2010–11	Wayne Middaugh	Joe Frans	Scott Howard	Scott Foster
2011–12	Glenn Howard	Wayne Middaugh	Brent Laing	Craig Savill
2012–13	Glenn Howard	Wayne Middaugh	Brent Laing	Craig Savill
2013–14	Glenn Howard	Wayne Middaugh	Brent Laing	Craig Savill
2014-15	Glenn Howard	Wayne Middaugh	Jon Mead	Craig Savill
2015–16	Glenn Howard	Wayne Middaugh	Richard Hart	Scott Howard
2021	Wayne Middaugh	Scott Howard	David Mathers	Tim March
