= 2002 M&M Meat Shops Canadian Open =

Grand Slam of Curling event

The 2002 M&M Meat Shops Canadian Open curling men's Grand Slam tournament was held December 12–15, 2002 at the Fort William Gardens in Thunder Bay, Ontario.

Edmonton's Kevin Martin rink won the event, defeating Ontario's Glenn Howard in the final, 8–4. Team Martin picked up $25,000 for the win. Martin's steal of one in the fourth proved to be a crucial turnout point, following two misses from Howard's third Richard Hart. Team Howard won $15,000. The total purse for the event was $100,000.

== Teams ==
The teams were as follows:

Skip	Third	Second	Lead	Locale
Dave Boehmer	Pat Spiring	Kerry Kunka	Richard Daneault	Petersfield, Manitoba
Kerry Burtnyk	Jeff Ryan	Rob Fowler	Keith Fenton	Winnipeg, Manitoba
Martin Ferland	Pierre Charette (skip)	Michel Ferland	Marco Berthelot	Buckingham, Quebec
Glen Despins	Rod Montgomery	Phillip Germain	Dwayne Mihalicz	Strongfield, Saskatchewan
Dale Duguid (Note: Team as of Oct 2002)	Brad Hannah (?)	Ryan Fry (?)	Kyle Werenich (?)	Winnipeg, Manitoba
Bert Gretzinger	Rob Koffski	Mark Whittle	Dave Mellof	Kelowna, British Columbia
Glenn Howard	Richard Hart	Collin Mitchell	Jason Mitchell	Coldwater, Ontario
Bruce Korte	Art Paulsen	Roger Korte	Rory Golanowski	Saskatoon, Saskatchewan
Allan Lyburn	Mark Taylor	Mike Horn	Ross Granger	Brandon, Manitoba
William Lyburn	Brent Braemer	Dean Klippenstine	Mark Kennedy	Brandon, Manitoba
Kevin Martin	Don Walchuk	Carter Rycroft	Don Bartlett	Edmonton, Alberta
Greg McAulay	Grant Dezura	Mike Bradley	Jody Sveistrup	Richmond, British Columbia
Wayne Middaugh	Graeme McCarrel	Scott Bailey	Doug Armstrong	Midland, Ontario
Kevin Park	Shane Park	Scott Park	Kerry Park	Edmonton, Alberta
Vic Peters	Mark Olson	Chris Neufeld	Steve Gould	Winnipeg, Manitoba
Brent Pierce	Bryan Miki	Dean Koyanagi	Ross Graham	New Westminster, British Columbia
Peter Steski	Chad McMullan	Jeff Steski	Andy Ormsby	Toronto, Ontario
Jeff Stoughton	Jon Mead	Garry Vandenberghe	Jim Spencer	Winnipeg, Manitoba

== Knockout brackets ==
=== A Event ===
Scores:

A	Qualifier 1
(Alberta) Kevin Park	1
(Manitoba) William Lyburn	7
(Manitoba) William Lyburn	2
(Quebec) Pierre Charette	7
(Quebec) Pierre Charette	8
(Ontario) Peter Steski	5
(Quebec) Pierre Charette	7
(Ontario) Wayne Middaugh	9
(British Columbia) Brent Pierce	2
(Ontario) Wayne Middaugh	13
(Ontario) Wayne Middaugh	5
(Manitoba) Jeff Stoughton	8
(British Columbia) Greg McAulay	10
(Saskatchewan) Glen Despins	9
(British Columbia) Greg McAulay	2
(Manitoba) Jeff Stoughton	7
(Manitoba) Allan Lyburn	6
(Manitoba) Jeff Stoughton	9

Quarterfinals
(Saskatchewan) Bruce Korte	6
(Manitoba) Dave Boehmer	7
(British Columbia) Bert Gretzinger	4
(Ontario) Glenn Howard	3
(Manitoba) Kerry Burtnyk	7
(Manitoba) Vic Peters	8
(Manitoba) Dale Duguid	4
(Alberta) Kevin Martin	8

Semifinals
(Manitoba) Dave Boehmer	7
(British Columbia) Bert Gretzinger	3
(Manitoba) Vic Peters	5
(Alberta) Kevin Martin	10

Final
(Manitoba) Dave Boehmer	7
(Alberta) Kevin Martin	2

=== B Event ===
Scores:

B	Qualifier 3
(Saskatchewan) Bruce Korte	6
(Ontario) Glenn Howard	7
(Ontario) Glenn Howard	8
(Manitoba) Kerry Burtnyk	1
(Manitoba) Kerry Burtnyk	8
(Manitoba) Dale Duguid	6
(Ontario) Glenn Howard	8
(British Columbia) Greg McAulay	6
(Ontario) Glenn Howard	7
(British Columbia) Bert Gretzinger	4
(Manitoba) William Lyburn	5
(British Columbia) Brent Pierce	4
(Manitoba) William Lyburn	2
(British Columbia) Bert Gretzinger	7

B
(Saskatchewan) Glen Despins	3
(Manitoba) Allan Lyburn	9

Semifinals
(Manitoba) Allan Lyburn	2
(Quebec) Pierre Charette	8

Qualifier 4
(Quebec) Pierre Charette	7
(Alberta) Kevin Martin	6

B
(Alberta) Kevin Park	7
(Ontario) Peter Steski	6

Semifinals
(Alberta) Kevin Park	7
(Manitoba) Vic Peters	5

Qualifier 5
(Alberta) Kevin Park	1
(Ontario) Wayne Middaugh	6

=== C Event ===
Scores:

C	Qualifier 6
(British Columbia) Brent Pierce	4
(Manitoba) Dale Duguid	6
(Saskatchewan) Bruce Korte	6
(Manitoba) Dale Duguid	10
(Manitoba) Dale Duguid	7
(British Columbia) Greg McAulay	2
(Manitoba) Dale Duguid	3
(Alberta) Kevin Martin	6

C	Qualifier 7
(Manitoba) Kerry Burtnyk	9
(Ontario) Peter Steski	4
(Saskatchewan) Glen Despins	7
(Ontario) Peter Steski	9
(Manitoba) Kerry Burtnyk	7
(Manitoba) William Lyburn	6
(Manitoba) Kerry Burtnyk	8
(Alberta) Kevin Park	5

C		Qualifier 8
(Manitoba) Allan Lyburn	1
(Manitoba) Vic Peters	7
(Manitoba) Vic Peters	7	(Manitoba) Vic Peters	6
		(British Columbia) Bert Gretzinger	4

== Playoffs ==
The playoff bracket was as follows:

Quarterfinals
(Manitoba) Vic Peters	10
(Manitoba) Jeff Stoughton	8
(Ontario) Glenn Howard	7
(Quebec) Pierre Charette	3
(Alberta) Kevin Martin	7
(Ontario) Wayne Middaugh	3
(Manitoba) Dave Boehmer	9
(Manitoba) Kerry Burtnyk	6

Semifinals
(Manitoba) Vic Peters	3
(Ontario) Glenn Howard	11
(Alberta) Kevin Martin	9
(Manitoba) Dave Boehmer	3

Final
(Ontario) Glenn Howard	4
(Alberta) Kevin Martin	8
