= CTRS standings =

Curling ranking system in Canada

The Canadian Team Ranking System (CTRS) is a point system used by Curling Canada to rank men's and women's curling teams across Canada. They are determined through points earned in various curling bonspiels held worldwide throughout the season.

CTRS points are the basis of the World Curling Tour's Order of Merit and are also used as criteria in identifying teams that qualify for the Canadian Olympic Curling Trials. Beginning in 2018, the top two CTRS teams that do not otherwise qualify for the Scotties Tournament of Hearts or Montana's Brier will earn the right to compete in a play-in game for a wildcard berth in those tournaments.

The following lists the top 25 teams in the CTRS standings for each curling season beginning in 2003–04.

== Records ==
=== 2003–04 ===
Rank	Men		Women	
Rank	Province	Skip	Province	Skip
1	Manitoba	Jeff Stoughton	Saskatchewan	Sherry Anderson
2	Ontario	Wayne Middaugh	Nova Scotia	Colleen Jones
3	Alberta	John Morris	Alberta	Shannon Kleibrink
4	Alberta	Randy Ferbey	Ontario	Sherry Middaugh (tie)
4	Alberta	Randy Ferbey	Quebec	Marie-France Larouche (tie)
5	Alberta	Kevin Martin		
6	Ontario	Glenn Howard	British Columbia	Kelly Scott
7	Nova Scotia	Mark Dacey	Alberta	Renelle Bryden
8	Saskatchewan	Brad Heidt	Manitoba	Jennifer Jones
9	Manitoba	Kerry Burtnyk	Quebec	Brenda Nicholls
10	Saskatchewan	Glen Despins	Manitoba	Lois Fowler
11	Saskatchewan	Pat Simmons	Alberta	Renee Sonnenberg
12	Newfoundland and Labrador	Brad Gushue (tie)	Saskatchewan	Amber Holland
12	Manitoba	Dave Boehmer (tie)	Saskatchewan	Amber Holland
13			Saskatchewan	Cathy Trowell
14	British Columbia	Jay Peachey	Alberta	Atina Johnston
15	Alberta	Jamie King	British Columbia	Georgina Wheatcroft
16	Saskatchewan	Bruce Korte	Newfoundland and Labrador	Cathy Cunningham
17	Alberta	Jamie Koe	Quebec	Chantal Osborne
18	New Brunswick	Russ Howard	Nova Scotia	Heather Smith-Dacey
19	Manitoba	Vic Peters	Ontario	Marilyn Bodogh
20	Quebec	Guy Hemmings	Manitoba	Cathy Overton-Clapham
21	Ontario	Mike Harris	Alberta	Cathy King
22	Alberta	Kevin Park	Saskatchewan	June Campbell
23	Manitoba	Brent Scales (tie)	Ontario	Anne Merklinger
23	Saskatchewan	Troy Robinson (tie)	Ontario	Anne Merklinger
23	Ontario	Rob Gordon (tie)	Ontario	Anne Merklinger
23	Saskatchewan	Scott Coghlan (tie)	Ontario	Anne Merklinger
24			Saskatchewan	Jan Betker (tie)
24			Ontario	Janet McGhee (tie)
24			Newfoundland and Labrador	Laura Phillips (tie)
24			Newfoundland and Labrador	Heather Strong (tie)

=== 2004–05 ===
Rank	Men		Women	
Rank	Province	Skip	Province	Skip
1	Alberta	Kevin Martin	Alberta	Shannon Kleibrink
2	Alberta	Randy Ferbey	British Columbia	Kelly Scott
3	Ontario	Glenn Howard	Saskatchewan	Stefanie Lawton
4	Manitoba	Jeff Stoughton	Alberta	Cathy King
5	Newfoundland and Labrador	Brad Gushue	Alberta	Renelle Bryden
6	Saskatchewan	Pat Simmons	Alberta	Cheryl Bernard
7	Ontario	Wayne Middaugh	Manitoba	Jennifer Jones
8	Quebec	Jean-Michel Ménard	Saskatchewan	Jan Betker
9	Manitoba	Kerry Burtnyk	Ontario	Jenn Hanna
10	Manitoba	Dave Boehmer	Alberta	Renee Sonnenberg
11	Alberta	John Morris	Saskatchewan	Michelle Englot
12	New Brunswick	Russ Howard	Ontario	Sherry Middaugh
13	Nova Scotia	Shawn Adams	Ontario	Anne Merklinger
14	British Columbia	Pat Ryan	Ontario	Jo-Ann Rizzo
15	Saskatchewan	Glen Despins	Saskatchewan	Sherry Anderson
16	Manitoba	Randy Dutiaume	Quebec	Marie-France Larouche
17	Alberta	Jamie King	Ontario	Christina Cadorin
18	British Columbia	Bob Ursel	Quebec	Brenda Nicholls
19	Alberta	Allan Lyburn	Nova Scotia	Kay Zinck
20	Saskatchewan	Bruce Korte	New Brunswick	Sandy Comeau
21	Ontario	Peter Corner	Nova Scotia	Colleen Jones
22	Ontario	Mike Harris	Ontario	Janet McGhee
23	Saskatchewan	Steve Laycock	Alberta	Atina Johnston/Heather Nedohin
24	British Columbia	Deane Horning	Prince Edward Island	Rebecca Jean MacPhee
25	Prince Edward Island	Roddy MacDonald	Nova Scotia	Heather Smith-Dacey

=== 2005–06 ===
Rank	Men		Women	
Rank	Province	Skip	Province	Skip
1	Alberta	Kevin Martin	Manitoba	Jennifer Jones
2	Alberta	Randy Ferbey	British Columbia	Kelly Scott
3	Ontario	Glenn Howard	Alberta	Shannon Kleibrink
4	Alberta	John Morris	Alberta	Cathy King
5	Manitoba	Jeff Stoughton	Saskatchewan	Stefanie Lawton
6	Newfoundland and Labrador	Brad Gushue	Saskatchewan	Jan Betker
7	Ontario	Wayne Middaugh	Manitoba	Janet Harvey
8	Nova Scotia	Mark Dacey	Alberta	Renee Sonnenberg
9	Quebec	Jean-Michel Ménard	Ontario	Jenn Hanna
10	Saskatchewan	Pat Simmons	Ontario	Sherry Middaugh
11	British Columbia	Bob Ursel	Saskatchewan	Sherry Anderson
12	British Columbia	Pat Ryan	Newfoundland and Labrador	Heather Strong
13	Alberta	Mark Johnson	Alberta	Cheryl Bernard
14	Quebec	Pierre Charette	Alberta	Heather Rankin
15	Saskatchewan	Bruce Korte	Quebec	Ève Bélisle
16	Nova Scotia	Shawn Adams	Saskatchewan	Amber Holland
17	Ontario	Mike Harris	Ontario	Janet McGhee
18	Manitoba	Dave Boehmer	Ontario	Anne Merklinger
19	Manitoba	Graham Feeman	New Brunswick	Andrea Kelly
20	Saskatchewan	Brad Heidt	Saskatchewan	Candace Chisholm
21	Manitoba	Vic Peters	Prince Edward Island	Suzanne Gaudet
22	Northwest Territories	Jamie Koe	New Brunswick	Sandy Comeau
23	Manitoba	Ryan Fry	Alberta	Renelle Bryden
24	Saskatchewan	Glen Despins	Saskatchewan	Karen Purdy
25	British Columbia	Sean Geall	Saskatchewan	Tracy Streifel

=== 2006–07 ===
Rank	Men		Women	
Rank	Province	Skip	Province	Skip
1	Alberta	Kevin Martin	Manitoba	Jennifer Jones
2	Ontario	Glenn Howard	British Columbia	Kelly Scott
3	Alberta	Randy Ferbey	Saskatchewan	Sherry Anderson
4	Alberta	Kevin Koe	Alberta	Cheryl Bernard
5	Manitoba	Jeff Stoughton	Alberta	Shannon Kleibrink
6	Saskatchewan	Pat Simmons	Alberta	Cathy King
7	Newfoundland and Labrador	Brad Gushue	Saskatchewan	Stefanie Lawton
8	Manitoba	Kerry Burtnyk	Ontario	Sherry Middaugh
9	Saskatchewan	Joel Jordison	British Columbia	Kelley Law
10	Ontario	Wayne Middaugh	Manitoba	Karen Porritt
11	Alberta	Mark Johnson	Alberta	Crystal Webster
12	Alberta	Don Walchuk	Alberta	Deb Santos
13	Ontario	John Base	Saskatchewan	Jan Betker
14	Quebec	Pierre Charette	Prince Edward Island	Suzanne Gaudet
15	Alberta	Jamie King	Alberta	Renelle Bryden
16	Saskatchewan	Bruce Korte	Newfoundland and Labrador	Heather Strong
17	Nova Scotia	Shawn Adams	Manitoba	Darcy Robertson
18	Quebec	Robert Desjardins	Alberta	Heather Rankin
19	Manitoba	Reid Carruthers	Ontario	Krista Scharf
20	Manitoba	Vic Peters	Ontario	Jenn Hanna
21	Quebec	Jean-Michel Ménard	Ontario	Colleen Madonia
22	British Columbia	Brent Pierce	Ontario	Carrie Lindner
23	Ontario	John Epping	Quebec	Chantal Osborne
24	Alberta	Kurt Balderston	Ontario	Janet McGhee
25	Ontario	Bryan Cochrane	Nova Scotia	Kay Zinck

=== 2007–08 ===
Rank	Men		Women	
Rank	Province	Skip	Province	Skip
1	Ontario	Glenn Howard	Manitoba	Jennifer Jones
2	Alberta	Kevin Martin	Alberta	Shannon Kleibrink
3	Alberta	Kevin Koe	British Columbia	Kelly Scott
4	Manitoba	Kerry Burtnyk	Saskatchewan	Stefanie Lawton
5	Saskatchewan	Pat Simmons	Ontario	Sherry Middaugh
6	Manitoba	Jeff Stoughton	Alberta	Cheryl Bernard
7	Ontario	Wayne Middaugh	Saskatchewan	Michelle Englot
8	Alberta	Randy Ferbey	Saskatchewan	Sherry Anderson
9	Newfoundland and Labrador	Brad Gushue	Alberta	Cathy King
10	British Columbia	Bob Ursel	Ontario	Krista McCarville
11	British Columbia	Greg McAulay	Saskatchewan	Amber Holland
12	Manitoba	Mike McEwen	Quebec	Ève Bélisle
13	Nova Scotia	Shawn Adams	Alberta	Heather Rankin
14	Ontario	Peter Corner	Alberta	Kristie Moore
15	Saskatchewan	Joel Jordison	Quebec	Marie-France Larouche
16	Manitoba	Reid Carruthers	Newfoundland and Labrador	Heather Strong
17	Quebec	Jean-Michel Ménard	Ontario	Julie Reddick
18	Quebec	Martin Ferland	Prince Edward Island	Suzanne Gaudet
19	New Brunswick	Russ Howard	Ontario	Alison Goring
20	Alberta	Jamie King	Alberta	Renee Sonnenberg
21	Manitoba	Vic Peters	Saskatchewan	Chantelle Eberle
22	Quebec	Robert Desjardins	Saskatchewan	Jolene McIvor
23	Ontario	Kirk Ziola	Manitoba	Janet Harvey (tie)
23	Ontario	Kirk Ziola	Alberta	Deb Santos (tie)
24	Alberta	Charley Thomas	–	
25	Quebec	François Gagné	Ontario	Rachel Homan

=== 2008–09 ===
Rank	Men			Women		
Rank	Province	Skip	Points	Province	Skip	Points
1	Ontario	Glenn Howard	312.15	Alberta	Shannon Kleibrink	239.75
2	Alberta	Kevin Martin	307.25	Manitoba	Jennifer Jones	203.40
3	Alberta	Randy Ferbey	207.80	Quebec	Marie-France Larouche	183.30
4	Newfoundland and Labrador	Brad Gushue	205.15	Alberta	Cheryl Bernard	181.00
5	Ontario	Wayne Middaugh	195.15	Saskatchewan	Stefanie Lawton	150.00
6	Manitoba	Jeff Stoughton	193.70	British Columbia	Kelly Scott	114.45
7	Manitoba	Mike McEwen	178.95	Ontario	Sherry Middaugh	112.25
8	Manitoba	Kerry Burtnyk	167.00	Saskatchewan	Michelle Englot	100.25
9	Alberta	Kevin Koe	165.25	Alberta	Heather Rankin	92.80
10	Saskatchewan	Joel Jordison	105.60	Ontario	Rachel Homan	89.90
11	Quebec	Jean-Michel Ménard	99.50	Alberta	Crystal Webster	83.45
12	Alberta	Ted Appelman	98.15	British Columbia	Marla Mallett	81.60
13	British Columbia	Sean Geall	89.15	Alberta	Cathy King	81.35
14	Alberta	Chris Schille	79.05	Ontario	Krista McCarville	81.10
15	Ontario	Dale Matchett	78.85	Manitoba	Barb Spencer	75.15
16	British Columbia	Bob Ursel	77.30	Saskatchewan	Amber Holland	67.95
17	Ontario	Brad Jacobs	70.00	Quebec	Eve Bélisle	60.40
18	Saskatchewan	Brad Heidt	64.05	Nova Scotia	Mary-Anne Arsenault	54.70
19	Saskatchewan	Pat Simmons	61.75	British Columbia	Allison MacInnes	49.40
20	Manitoba	Reid Carruthers	58.60	Alberta	Renee Sonnenberg	45.35
21	Alberta	Steve Petryk	54.60	Newfoundland and Labrador	Heather Strong	44.40
22	New Brunswick	Russ Howard	53.80	Ontario	Julie Reddick	44.35
23	Quebec	Guy Hemmings	51.05	Saskatchewan	Chantelle Eberle	43.10
24	British Columbia	Greg McAulay	45.60	Saskatchewan	Sherry Anderson	42.60
25	Saskatchewan	Warren Hassall	45.30	Alberta	Kristie Moore	39.80

=== 2009–10 ===
Rank	Men			Women		
Rank	Province	Skip	Points	Province	Skip	Points
1	Alberta	Kevin Martin	255.85	Manitoba	Jennifer Jones	239.48
2	Ontario	Glenn Howard	235.60	Alberta	Cheryl Bernard	208.82
3	Newfoundland and Labrador	Brad Gushue	187.02	British Columbia	Kelly Scott	156.88
4	Alberta	Kevin Koe	172.71	Saskatchewan	Amber Holland	154.08
5	Manitoba	Jeff Stoughton	167.12	Alberta	Shannon Kleibrink	118.68
6	Alberta	Randy Ferbey	154.11	Saskatchewan	Stefanie Lawton	111.36
7	Manitoba	Mike McEwen	149.71	Ontario	Krista McCarville	107.40
8	Ontario	Wayne Middaugh	138.07	Alberta	Crystal Webster	105.94
9	British Columbia	Bob Ursel	122.55	Ontario	Jo-Ann Rizzo	86.43
10	Saskatchewan	Pat Simmons	113.88	Alberta	Cathy King	85.26
11	Ontario	Dale Matchett	96.26	Quebec	Ève Bélisle	77.99
12	Quebec	Jean-Michel Ménard	94.81	Alberta	Heather Nedohin	70.26
13	Manitoba	Jason Gunnlaugson	93.04	Alberta	Val Sweeting	58.28
14	Manitoba	Kerry Burtnyk	83.25	Ontario	Rachel Homan	56.63
15	Ontario	Peter Corner	80.08	Ontario	Cathy Auld	47.04
16	Alberta	Ted Appelman	78.35	Manitoba	Kerri Flett	43.32
17	Quebec	Martin Ferland	73.04	Manitoba	Janet Harvey	41.70
18	Ontario	Brad Jacobs	70.315	Ontario	Jacqueline Harrison	40.12
19	Manitoba	Reid Carruthers	67.10	Ontario	Julie Hastings	39.50
20	Ontario	Greg Balsdon	66.46	Quebec	Marie-France Larouche	35.78
21	British Columbia	Sean Geall	62.17	Manitoba	Chelsea Carey	32.96
22	Ontario	Jake Higgs	57.30	Alberta	Heather Rankin	30.50
23	Alberta	Chris Schille	45.83	Ontario	Sherry Middaugh	29.65
24	Manitoba	David Bohn	44.05	Manitoba	Jill Thurston	28.00
25	Quebec	Simon Dupuis	41.71	Manitoba	Kristy Jenion	27.71

=== 2010–11 ===
Rank	Men			Women		
Rank	Province	Skip	Points	Province	Skip	Points
1	Alberta	Kevin Martin	256.04	Manitoba	Jennifer Jones	214.90
2	Manitoba	Mike McEwen	238.32	Saskatchewan	Amber Holland	171.92
3	Manitoba	Jeff Stoughton	226.21	Alberta	Shannon Kleibrink	169.84
4	Ontario	Glenn Howard	222.52	Alberta	Heather Nedohin	154.10
5	Alberta	Kevin Koe	172.36	Manitoba	Chelsea Carey	149.27
6	Newfoundland and Labrador	Brad Gushue	136.26	Saskatchewan	Stefanie Lawton	145.89
7	Saskatchewan	Pat Simmons	114.58	Ontario	Rachel Homan	145.89
8	Ontario	Wayne Middaugh	113.29	Alberta	Cheryl Bernard	105.24
9	Manitoba	Rob Fowler	107.46	Manitoba	Cathy Overton-Clapham	95.76
10	Ontario	John Epping	100.58	Alberta	Jessie Kaufman	79.56
11	Ontario	Brad Jacobs	91.11	Alberta	Desiree Owen	70.69
12	British Columbia	Bob Ursel	89.78	Ontario	Sherry Middaugh	70.29
13	Quebec	Jean-Michel Menard	84.21	British Columbia	Kelly Scott	69.73
14	Ontario	Dale Matchett	82.92	Manitoba	Jill Thurston	63.48
15	Alberta	Don Walchuk	68.04	Ontario	Krista McCarville	57.05
16	Ontario	Mark Kean	63.21	Alberta	Val Sweeting	41.04
17	Alberta	Robert Schlender	61.44	Ontario	Kirsten Wall	38.75
18	Quebec	Serge Reid	60.79	Ontario	Tracy Horgan	38.44
19	Ontario	Mark Bice	60.73	Alberta	Heather Rankin	37.35
20	Alberta	Brock Virtue	56.28	Prince Edward Island	Kathy O'Rourke	37.12
21	Ontario	Mathew Camm	54.66	Ontario	Alison Goring	34.51
22	Alberta	Brent Bawel	49.59	Saskatchewan	Chantelle Eberle	31.35
23	Ontario	Greg Balsdon	48.74	Quebec	Marie-France Larouche	30.14
24	Quebec	Martin Ferland	46.62	Alberta	Renee Sonnenberg	29.13
25	Ontario	Jake Higgs	43.58	Nova Scotia	Colleen Jones	29.00

=== 2011–12 ===
Men
Province	Skip	Points
Ontario	Glenn Howard	268.520
Manitoba	Mike McEwen	237.810
Alberta	Kevin Martin	212.470
Alberta	Kevin Koe	158.960
Ontario	John Epping	155.950
Manitoba	Jeff Stoughton	142.455
Newfoundland and Labrador	Brad Gushue	124.655
Manitoba	Rob Fowler	112.395
Alberta	Randy Ferbey	91.700
Ontario	Brad Jacobs	87.220
Ontario	Rob Rumfeldt	84.285
British Columbia	Jim Cotter	81.150
Saskatchewan	Steve Laycock	80.475
Quebec	Jean-Michel Menard	70.970
Alberta	Brock Virtue	64.595
Ontario	Mark Kean	56.334
Ontario	Jake Higgs	50.805
Alberta	Steve Petryk	44.749
Ontario	Greg Balsdon	44.025
Alberta	Jamie King	41.770
Quebec	Robert Desjardins	41.571
Ontario	Chris Gardner	39.615
British Columbia	Brent Pierce	38.260
Alberta	Robert Schlender	37.385
Prince Edward Island	Brett Gallant	32.900

Women
Province	Skip	Points
Manitoba	Jennifer Jones	199.350
Alberta	Heather Nedohin	154.615
Ontario	Sherry Middaugh	137.575
Manitoba	Cathy Overton-Clapham	135.900
Saskatchewan	Stefanie Lawton	133.335
Manitoba	Chelsea Carey	95.700
Alberta	Crystal Webster	87.750
Alberta	Cheryl Bernard	81.715
Alberta	Renee Sonnenberg	76.965
British Columbia	Kelly Scott	70.414
Alberta	Shannon Kleibrink	64.750
Alberta	Val Sweeting	48.320
Ontario	Rachel Homan	43.195
Alberta	Jessie Kaufman	42.950
Alberta	Dana Ferguson	42.600
Ontario	Krista McCarville	38.750
Saskatchewan	Amber Holland	38.589
Manitoba	Barb Spencer	36.839
Ontario	Laura Crocker	36.425
British Columbia	Kelley Law	35.530
Saskatchewan	Michelle Englot	34.612
Ontario	Tracy Horgan	32.555
Prince Edward Island	Suzanne Birt	32.360
Nova Scotia	Heather Smith-Dacey	32.000
Ontario	Allison Nimik	29.785

=== 2012–13 ===
Men
Province	Skip	Points
Manitoba	Jeff Stoughton	243.500
Ontario	Glenn Howard	234.020
Alberta	Kevin Koe	218.240
Ontario	Brad Jacobs	204.800
Manitoba	Mike McEwen	198.175
Alberta	Kevin Martin	160.460
Newfoundland and Labrador	Brad Gushue	148.655
Ontario	John Epping	140.120
Ontario	Mark Kean	111.050
British Columbia	Jim Cotter	102.605
Saskatchewan	Steve Laycock	89.489
Ontario	Joe Frans	76.520
Quebec	Jean-Michel Ménard	76.255
Ontario	Greg Balsdon	72.815
Manitoba	Rob Fowler	68.000
Ontario	Bryan Cochrane	67.165
Nova Scotia	Mark Dacey	54.910
Manitoba	William Lyburn	54.025
British Columbia	Brent Pierce	51.625
Alberta	Brendan Bottcher	44.625
Ontario	Jake Higgs	43.195
Ontario	Rob Rumfeldt	36.940
Alberta	Jamie King	34.630
Saskatchewan	Randy Bryden	31.160
Quebec	Martin Ferland	30.820

Women
Province	Skip	Points
Ontario	Rachel Homan	225.400
Manitoba	Jennifer Jones	202.800
Saskatchewan	Stefanie Lawton	201.450
Alberta	Heather Nedohin	144.050
Manitoba	Chelsea Carey	136.000
Alberta	Shannon Kleibrink	121.125
Ontario	Sherry Middaugh	112.910
Alberta	Laura Crocker	99.330
Alberta	Renée Sonnenberg	96.850
Alberta	Cheryl Bernard	83.745
Alberta	Crystal Webster	75.000
Saskatchewan	Amber Holland	67.330
Alberta	Val Sweeting	67.180
British Columbia	Kelly Scott	67.000
Ontario	Cathy Auld	57.020
Ontario	Tracy Horgan	53.335
Manitoba	Barb Spencer	38.350
Saskatchewan	Chantelle Eberle	35.675
Nova Scotia	Mary-Anne Arsenault	32.685
Manitoba	Cathy Overton-Clapham	31.000
Alberta	Casey Scheidegger	30.155
Saskatchewan	Jill Shumay	28.510
Alberta	Lisa Eyamie	20.665
Prince Edward Island	Suzanne Birt	19.300
Ontario	Allison Nimik	18.725

=== 2013–14 ===
Men
Province	Skip	Points
Ontario	Brad Jacobs	264.000
Alberta	Kevin Koe	208.000
Alberta	Kevin Martin	200.250
Ontario	Glenn Howard	195.000
Manitoba	Mike McEwen	183.910
Manitoba	Jeff Stoughton	183.000
Newfoundland and Labrador	Brad Gushue	181.980
British Columbia	John Morris	148.780
Saskatchewan	Steve Laycock	99.150
Ontario	Mark Kean	82.425
Quebec	Jean-Michel Ménard	69.240
Saskatchewan	Brock Virtue	65.860
Ontario	Greg Balsdon	61.650
Ontario	Bryan Cochrane	59.500
Ontario	John Epping	48.000
Manitoba	Rob Fowler	41.175
Ontario	Robert Rumfeldt	41.215
Ontario	Joe Frans	41.500
Alberta	Brendan Bottcher	38.860
New Brunswick	James Grattan	38.260
Ontario	Jake Higgs	34.790
Ontario	Wayne Tuck, Jr.	30.410
Alberta	Matthew Blandford	35.490
Saskatchewan	Scott Bitz	24.815
Ontario	Mike Anderson	24.220

Women
Province	Skip	Points
Manitoba	Jennifer Jones	265.000
Ontario	Rachel Homan	216.420
Alberta	Val Sweeting	149.390
Saskatchewan	Stefanie Lawton	134.360
Manitoba	Chelsea Carey	108.520
Alberta	Heather Nedohin	93.470
Ontario	Sherry Middaugh	90.050
Alberta	Renée Sonnenberg	77.250
Alberta	Crystal Webster	62.000
Ontario	Allison Flaxey	50.175
Alberta	Cheryl Bernard	46.300
Ontario	Julie Hastings	41.635
Manitoba	Barb Spencer	36.260
British Columbia	Kelly Scott	33.500
Manitoba	Jill Thurston	32.950
Saskatchewan	Chantelle Eberle	31.835
Ontario	Cathy Auld	29.670
Nova Scotia	Heather Smith	27.850
Alberta	Laura Crocker	27.000
Saskatchewan	Amber Holland	25.500
Alberta	Casey Scheidegger	22.630
Alberta	Kelsey Rocque	21.250
Manitoba	Janet Harvey	20.000
Saskatchewan	Penny Barker	19.625
Saskatchewan	Michelle Englot	18.600

=== 2014–15 ===
Men
Member Association	Skip	Points
Manitoba	Mike McEwen	287.000
Northern Ontario	Brad Jacobs	244.000
Newfoundland and Labrador	Brad Gushue	190.950
Saskatchewan	Steve Laycock	152.615
Alberta	Kevin Koe	147.730
Manitoba	Reid Carruthers	142.230
Ontario	John Epping	141.500
Ontario	Glenn Howard	124.000
Alberta	Brendan Bottcher	122.275
Alberta	John Morris	108.000
Manitoba	Jeff Stoughton	93.015
Prince Edward Island	Adam Casey	88.530
Quebec	Jean-Michel Ménard	67.720
Ontario	Don Bowser	61.595
Ontario	Mark Kean	58.000
British Columbia	Jim Cotter	46.975
Alberta	Mick Lizmore	43.545
Saskatchewan	Jason Jacobson	32.575
Ontario	Robert Rumfeldt	29.100
Nova Scotia	Chad Stevens	29.020
Ontario	Peter Corner	26.990
British Columbia	Brent Pierce	26.615
Ontario	Pat Ferris	26.600
Manitoba	William Lyburn	26.475
Ontario	Joe Frans	23.885

Women
Member Association	Skip	Points
Manitoba	Jennifer Jones	226.400
Alberta	Val Sweeting	211.970
Ontario	Rachel Homan	202.080
Ontario	Sherry Middaugh	118.960
Alberta	Heather Nedohin	113.620
Manitoba	Jill Thurston	85.751
Manitoba	Kristy McDonald	81.175
Alberta	Chelsea Carey	74.180
Northern Ontario	Tracy Fleury	72.360
Ontario	Julie Hastings	62.205
Saskatchewan	Sherry Anderson	49.520
Manitoba	Barb Spencer	43.395
Saskatchewan	Michelle Englot	40.091
Manitoba	Michelle Montford	32.275
Manitoba	Kerri Einarson	29.150
Saskatchewan	Chantelle Eberle	27.900
Alberta	Kelsey Rocque	25.470
Alberta	Casey Scheidegger	25.340
Ontario	Breanne Meakin	24.105
Quebec	Lauren Mann	23.783
Ontario	Erin Morrissey	23.295
British Columbia	Kelly Scott	22.481
Ontario	Jacqueline Harrison	21.650
Saskatchewan	Trish Paulsen	20.480
Ontario	Danielle Inglis	18.570

=== 2015–16 ===
Men
Member Association	Skip	Points
Alberta	Kevin Koe	531.160
Newfoundland and Labrador	Brad Gushue	527.643
Manitoba	Mike McEwen	457.921
Manitoba	Reid Carruthers	397.844
Ontario	John Epping	369.167
Northern Ontario	Brad Jacobs	345.129
Saskatchewan	Steve Laycock	324.012
Ontario	Glenn Howard	268.134
Alberta	Charley Thomas	224.781
British Columbia	Jim Cotter	222.416
Alberta	Brendan Bottcher	220.357
Alberta	Pat Simmons	200.611
Manitoba	William Lyburn	160.289
Saskatchewan	Shaun Meachem	135.862
Quebec	Jean-Michel Ménard	135.366
Ontario	Mark Bice	117.373
Manitoba	Matt Dunstone	115.401
Nova Scotia	Jamie Murphy	109.776
Ontario	Scott Bailey	100.421
Ontario	Mark Kean	99.958
Manitoba	Alex Forrest	98.188
Ontario	Greg Balsdon	97.861
British Columbia	Dean Joanisse	97.629
Saskatchewan	Bruce Korte	96.609
Alberta	Mick Lizmore	93.886

Women
Member Association	Skip	Points
Ontario	Rachel Homan	583.708
Manitoba	Jennifer Jones	425.936
Alberta	Val Sweeting	347.276
Alberta	Chelsea Carey	308.311
Manitoba	Kerri Einarson	289.274
Alberta	Kelsey Rocque	263.221
Northern Ontario	Tracy Fleury	239.879
Saskatchewan	Stefanie Lawton	212.449
Northern Ontario	Krista McCarville	187.920
Manitoba	Kristy McDonald	183.786
Ontario	Allison Flaxey	175.063
Ontario	Sherry Middaugh	153.789
Ontario	Jacqueline Harrison	145.379
Saskatchewan	Michelle Englot	125.749
Ontario	Julie Tippin	118.627
Alberta	Shannon Kleibrink	107.388
Manitoba	Barb Spencer	105.799
Manitoba	Darcy Robertson	103.154
Manitoba	Joelle Brown	93.499
Prince Edward Island	Suzanne Birt	93.495
Nova Scotia	Theresa Breen	91.326
Alberta	Casey Scheidegger	87.259
Manitoba	Michelle Montford	86.648
Nova Scotia	Jill Brothers	86.426
Ontario	Cathy Auld	85.814

=== 2016–17 ===
Men
Member Association	Skip	Points
Newfoundland and Labrador	Brad Gushue	520.532
Manitoba	Reid Carruthers	404.461
Northern Ontario	Brad Jacobs	393.266
Manitoba	Mike McEwen	340.698
Ontario	John Epping	331.505
Alberta	Kevin Koe	330.395
Saskatchewan	Steve Laycock	299.038
British Columbia	John Morris	275.034
Alberta	Brendan Bottcher	205.833
Alberta	Charley Thomas	199.584
Ontario	Glenn Howard	185.301
Manitoba	Matt Dunstone	173.781
Manitoba	Jason Gunnlaugson	166.260
Ontario	Greg Balsdon	165.608
Saskatchewan	Adam Casey	165.408
Saskatchewan	Bruce Korte	149.584
Ontario	Dayna Deruelle	139.730
Manitoba	William Lyburn	129.666
Ontario	Mark Bice	124.506
Manitoba	Dennis Bohn	111.476
Nova Scotia	Stuart Thompson	103.758
Quebec	Jean-Michel Ménard	103.134
Nova Scotia	Jamie Murphy	102.068
Saskatchewan	Kody Hartung	92.983
Manitoba	Braden Calvert	92.683

Women
Member Association	Skip	Points
Ontario	Rachel Homan	455.229
Manitoba	Jennifer Jones	397.079
Ontario	Allison Flaxey	341.057
Alberta	Val Sweeting	325.544
Alberta	Casey Scheidegger	303.570
Manitoba	Michelle Englot	264.412
Northern Ontario	Tracy Fleury	224.897
Ontario	Sherry Middaugh	192.222
Alberta	Chelsea Carey	189.416
Ontario	Jacqueline Harrison	184.335
Ontario	Julie Tippin	181.782
Alberta	Kelsey Rocque	169.835
Manitoba	Kerri Einarson	160.943
Northern Ontario	Krista McCarville	158.340
Alberta	Shannon Kleibrink	157.554
Alberta	Nadine Chyz	154.747
British Columbia	Karla Thompson	138.616
Manitoba	Briane Meilleur	134.790
Manitoba	Shannon Birchard	109.329
Manitoba	Darcy Robertson	104.364
Ontario	Cathy Auld	93.548
Ontario	Heather Heggestad	93.218
Saskatchewan	Chantelle Eberle	92.713
Nova Scotia	Jill Brothers	92.165
British Columbia	Diane Gushulak	91.853

=== 2017–18 ===
Men
Member Association	Skip	Points
Newfoundland and Labrador	Brad Gushue	521.230
Alberta	Kevin Koe	457.629
Manitoba	Mike McEwen	378.888
Northern Ontario	Brad Jacobs	289.034
Alberta	Brendan Bottcher	283.098
Manitoba	Jason Gunnlaugson	276.286
Manitoba	Reid Carruthers	270.599
Ontario	John Epping	260.527
Ontario	Glenn Howard	229.770
Manitoba	Pat Simmons	164.408
Saskatchewan	Steve Laycock	151.647
Saskatchewan	Colton Flasch	146.269
Ontario	Codey Maus	143.417
Ontario	Greg Balsdon	133.531
Manitoba	William Lyburn	132.245
Northern Ontario	Tanner Horgan	120.528
British Columbia	John Morris	116.886
Saskatchewan	Adam Casey	114.362
Manitoba	JT Ryan	111.672
Ontario	Mark Kean	110.680
Quebec	Jean-Michel Ménard	106.926
Manitoba	Braden Calvert	106.053
Nova Scotia	Jamie Murphy	98.695
Quebec	Jean-Sébastien Roy	97.600
Quebec	Martin Ferland	94.367

Women
Member Association	Skip	Points
Manitoba	Jennifer Jones	498.079
Ontario	Rachel Homan	372.294
Alberta	Chelsea Carey	367.848
Manitoba	Kerri Einarson	357.686
Alberta	Kelsey Rocque	232.502
Alberta	Val Sweeting	201.288
Alberta	Casey Scheidegger	194.359
Manitoba	Darcy Robertson	190.691
Manitoba	Michelle Englot	182.728
Northern Ontario	Tracy Fleury	140.539
Ontario	Julie Tippin	130.737
Northern Ontario	Krista McCarville	121.016
Manitoba	Shannon Birchard	116.257
Ontario	Sherry Middaugh	114.680
Ontario	Jacqueline Harrison	112.482
Ontario	Allison Flaxey	104.036
Manitoba	Briane Meilleur	101.914
Saskatchewan	Penny Barker	97.133
Ontario	Susan Froud	97.113
Ontario	Hollie Duncan	96.539
Alberta	Shannon Kleibrink	95.446
Nova Scotia	Mary-Anne Arsenault	91.387
Ontario	Chrissy Cadorin	84.898
Ontario	Cathy Auld	83.915
Saskatchewan	Chantelle Eberle	78.403

=== 2018–19 ===
Men
Member Association	Skip	Points
Alberta	Brendan Bottcher	494.058
Alberta	Kevin Koe	485.595
Ontario	John Epping	362.112
Northern Ontario	Brad Jacobs	353.420
Newfoundland and Labrador	Brad Gushue	317.812
Ontario	Glenn Howard	294.349
Saskatchewan	Matt Dunstone	286.121
Manitoba	Reid Carruthers	257.434
Ontario	Scott McDonald	228.957
Manitoba	Jason Gunnlaugson	208.432
Saskatchewan	Kirk Muyres	195.148
Manitoba	Braden Calvert	179.398
Alberta	Karsten Sturmay	154.450
Ontario	Charley Thomas	148.854
Saskatchewan	Kody Hartung	127.267
Manitoba	Tanner Lott	125.304
Ontario	John Willsey	124.672
Northern Ontario	Tanner Horgan	110.469
British Columbia	Jim Cotter	103.202
Quebec	Mike Fournier	102.237
Ontario	Pat Ferris	102.022
Nova Scotia	Stuart Thompson	102.001
Manitoba	Dennis Bohn	101.561
Manitoba	Ty Dilello	100.518
Ontario	Wayne Tuck Jr.	98.745

Women
Member Association	Skip	Points
Ontario	Rachel Homan	529.715
Manitoba	Kerri Einarson	496.955
Manitoba	Jennifer Jones	362.646
Alberta	Chelsea Carey	323.572
Alberta	Casey Scheidegger	276.421
Saskatchewan	Robyn Silvernagle	274.663
Manitoba	Tracy Fleury	259.809
Manitoba	Darcy Robertson	200.181
Alberta	Laura Walker	178.703
Manitoba	Allison Flaxey	154.618
Ontario	Jestyn Murphy	151.581
Alberta	Kelsey Rocque	150.399
Ontario	Jacqueline Harrison	149.774
Ontario	Hollie Duncan	132.513
British Columbia	Corryn Brown	128.842
Ontario	Julie Tippin	128.504
British Columbia	Sarah Wark	118.928
Prince Edward Island	Suzanne Birt	116.730
Manitoba	Beth Peterson	115.831
Manitoba	Jennifer Clark-Rouire	114.815
Ontario	Cathy Auld	112.037
Saskatchewan	Amber Holland	109.709
Saskatchewan	Kristen Streifel	108.615
Saskatchewan	Sherry Anderson	108.094
Northern Ontario	Krista McCarville	104.675

=== 2019–20 ===
Men
Member Association	Skip	Points
Northern Ontario	Brad Jacobs	482.483
Ontario	John Epping	444.189
Newfoundland and Labrador	Brad Gushue	392.540
Alberta	Brendan Bottcher	345.626
Manitoba	Mike McEwen	316.594
Alberta	Kevin Koe	276.488
Saskatchewan	Matt Dunstone	252.894
Manitoba	Jason Gunnlaugson	236.086
Ontario	Glenn Howard	184.546
Manitoba	Tanner Horgan	176.554
Ontario	Scott McDonald	173.166
Manitoba	Braden Calvert	172.027
Saskatchewan	Kirk Muyres	171.250
British Columbia	Tyler Tardi	150.325
Alberta	Jeremy Harty	141.724
Alberta	Karsten Sturmay	129.996
Ontario	Pat Ferris	126.750
Nova Scotia	Jamie Murphy	120.803
Quebec	Mike Fournier	118.324
Manitoba	Corey Chambers	116.764
Quebec	Vincent Roberge	112.591
Manitoba	Sean Grassie	99.641
British Columbia	Jim Cotter	96.552
Saskatchewan	Jason Jacobson	96.154
Ontario	Mark Kean	96.149

Women
Member Association	Skip	Points
Manitoba	Kerri Einarson	420.069
Manitoba	Tracy Fleury	404.325
Manitoba	Jennifer Jones	341.765
Ontario	Rachel Homan	325.931
Alberta	Chelsea Carey	230.255
Alberta	Kelsey Rocque	198.056
Alberta	Laura Walker	172.405
British Columbia	Corryn Brown	168.227
Prince Edward Island	Suzanne Birt	144.430
Saskatchewan	Robyn Silvernagle	135.855
Manitoba	Mackenzie Zacharias	134.874
Manitoba	Beth Peterson	134.291
Ontario	Jestyn Murphy	123.123
Saskatchewan	Sherry Anderson	122.015
Ontario	Megan Balsdon	117.872
Northern Ontario	Krista McCarville	108.345
Manitoba	Theresa Cannon	107.376
Saskatchewan	Penny Barker	105.994
Alberta	Casey Scheidegger	104.307
Ontario	Hollie Duncan	99.961
Manitoba	Darcy Robertson	94.604
Ontario	Lauren Horton	92.000
Ontario	Danielle Inglis	90.257
Ontario	Kaitlyn Jones	84.048
Manitoba	Abby Ackland	82.197

=== 2021–22 ===
No ranking was calculated for the 2020–21 curling season due to the COVID-19 pandemic in Canada

Men
Member Association	Skip	Points
Newfoundland and Labrador	Brad Gushue	553.867
Alberta	Kevin Koe	408.072
Northern Ontario	Brad Jacobs	360.807
Alberta	Brendan Bottcher	288.696
Manitoba	Jason Gunnlaugson	244.641
Ontario	Glenn Howard	215.093
Manitoba	Mike McEwen	214.113
Saskatchewan	Matt Dunstone	206.531
Saskatchewan	Colton Flasch	202.668
Ontario	John Epping	159.966
Manitoba	Pat Simmons	141.378
Ontario	Tanner Horgan	136.863
Saskatchewan	Kody Hartung	135.079
Alberta	Karsten Sturmay	133.079
British Columbia	Tyler Tardi	115.331
Quebec	Mike Fournier	112.677
Nova Scotia	Paul Flemming	97.577
Saskatchewan	Jason Jacobson	94.747
Manitoba	Braden Calvert	94.061
Ontario	Scott Mitchell	91.727
Saskatchewan	Ryan Deis	89.517
Saskatchewan	Daymond Bernath	86.781
Manitoba	Riley Smith	80.194
Alberta	Jeremy Harty	79.057
Alberta	Ryan Jacques	72.175

Women
Member Association	Skip	Points
Manitoba	Tracy Fleury	425.626
Manitoba	Kerri Einarson	390.033
Manitoba	Jennifer Jones	267.229
Ontario	Rachel Homan	237.375
Alberta	Laura Walker	183.644
Alberta	Chelsea Carey	171.371
Manitoba	Mackenzie Zacharias	165.854
Northern Ontario	Krista McCarville	165.080
Ontario	Hollie Duncan	155.281
Alberta	Kelsey Rocque	139.973
Nova Scotia	Christina Black	134.517
Saskatchewan	Penny Barker	134.152
Alberta	Casey Scheidegger	130.544
Northwest Territories	Kerry Galusha	125.798
New Brunswick	Andrea Crawford	122.848
Alberta	Selena Sturmay	113.910
Manitoba	Kristy Watling	105.740
Saskatchewan	Amber Holland	102.829
British Columbia	Corryn Brown	98.669
Saskatchewan	Robyn Silvernagle	92.442
Saskatchewan	Michelle Englot	83.304
Manitoba	Kaitlyn Jones	80.792
Alberta	Kayla Skrlik	78.005
Ontario	Jestyn Murphy	77.337
Prince Edward Island	Suzanne Birt	76.858

=== 2022–23 ===
Men
Member Association	Skip	Points
Newfoundland and Labrador	Brad Gushue	417.000
Alberta	Brendan Bottcher	362.000
Manitoba	Matt Dunstone	341.000
Alberta	Kevin Koe	306.250
Manitoba	Reid Carruthers	201.500
Alberta	Karsten Sturmay	168.250
Alberta	Aaron Sluchinski	152.125
Ontario	Mike McEwen	149.875
Ontario	John Epping	144.625
Northern Ontario	Tanner Horgan	140.000
Manitoba	Ryan Wiebe	135.375
Saskatchewan	Colton Flasch	132.500
Saskatchewan	Kelly Knapp	131.375
Quebec	Félix Asselin	123.688
British Columbia	Jacques Gauthier	113.938
Ontario	Pat Ferris	112.625
Ontario	Sam Mooibroek	108.750
Saskatchewan	Rylan Kleiter	96.500
Nova Scotia	Owen Purcell	91.500
Saskatchewan	Kody Hartung	88.750
Ontario	Glenn Howard	79.000
Manitoba	Braden Calvert	78.063
Saskatchewan	Michael Carss	76.313
Ontario	Landan Rooney	74.375
British Columbia	Brent Pierce	73.375

Women
Member Association	Skip	Points
Manitoba	Kerri Einarson	451.000
Ontario	Rachel Homan	368.250
Manitoba	Jennifer Jones	288.000
Manitoba	Kaitlyn Lawes	225.500
British Columbia	Clancy Grandy	217.875
Alberta	Casey Scheidegger	194.750
Manitoba	Meghan Walter	177.250
Nova Scotia	Christina Black	167.250
Ontario	Isabelle Ladouceur	146.438
Alberta	Kayla Skrlik	134.250
Ontario	Danielle Inglis	111.250
New Brunswick	Andrea Kelly	106.000
Alberta	Serena Gray-Withers	104.250
Saskatchewan	Nancy Martin	103.938
Saskatchewan	Penny Barker	100.500
Alberta	Jessie Hunkin	98.438
British Columbia	Corryn Brown	97.750
Saskatchewan	Skylar Ackerman	96.875
Northwest Territories	Kerry Galusha	95.500
Manitoba	Beth Peterson	98.813
Ontario	Carly Howard	84.250
Alberta	Kelsey Rocque	73.875
Alberta	Selena Sturmay	72.813
Northern Ontario	Krista McCarville	70.875
Ontario	Lauren Mann	69.250

=== 2023–24 ===
Men
Member Association	Skip	Points
Newfoundland and Labrador	Brad Gushue	381.750
Alberta	Brendan Bottcher	366.750
Saskatchewan	Mike McEwen	236.875
Manitoba	Matt Dunstone	224.250
Alberta	Kevin Koe	209.500
Manitoba	Reid Carruthers	208.000
Alberta	Aaron Sluchinski	167.250
Saskatchewan	Rylan Kleiter	139.625
Alberta	Karsten Sturmay	134.000
Ontario	John Epping	123.250
Ontario	Sam Mooibroek	120.875
Ontario	Glenn Howard	115.750
Nova Scotia	Owen Purcell	101.813
Manitoba	Ryan Wiebe	100.125
British Columbia	Catlin Schneider	100.000
Quebec	Félix Asselin	91.063
Ontario	Pat Ferris	86.000
Saskatchewan	Kelly Knapp	83.125
Ontario	Jayden King	80.000
Northern Ontario	Tanner Horgan	75.063
Ontario	Mark Kean	72.375
Manitoba	Jordon McDonald	72.188
Ontario	Mike Fournier	71.875
Manitoba	Braden Calvert	70.875
Saskatchewan	Steve Laycock	66.375

Women
Member Association	Skip	Points
Ontario	Rachel Homan	498.750
Manitoba	Jennifer Jones	316.125
Manitoba	Kerri Einarson	251.250
Manitoba	Kaitlyn Lawes	207.375
Alberta	Selena Sturmay	180.125
Manitoba	Kate Cameron	167.000
Ontario	Danielle Inglis	145.438
British Columbia	Corryn Brown	136.625
Alberta	Serena Gray-Withers	128.625
Alberta	Kayla Skrlik	125.313
Manitoba	Jolene Campbell	122.938
Saskatchewan	Skylar Ackerman	119.313
British Columbia	Clancy Grandy	111.563
Nova Scotia	Christina Black	105.875
Manitoba	Beth Peterson	102.625
Saskatchewan	Nancy Martin	97.063
Alberta	Abby Marks	92.313
Alberta	Jessie Hunkin	84.000
Northwest Territories	Kerry Galusha	71.625
Quebec	Laurie St-Georges	69.813
Northern Ontario	Krista McCarville	69.563
Manitoba	Kristy Watling	64.688
Saskatchewan	Michelle Englot	60.625
Ontario	Isabelle Ladouceur	57.063
Ontario	Chelsea Brandwood	52.375

=== 2024–25 ===
Men
Member Association	Skip	Points
Alberta	Brad Jacobs	380.250
Manitoba	Matt Dunstone	353.250
Saskatchewan	Mike McEwen	292.000
Newfoundland and Labrador	Brad Gushue	274.250
Northern Ontario	John Epping	238.750
Saskatchewan	Rylan Kleiter	186.625
Manitoba	Jordon McDonald	162.000
Manitoba	Reid Carruthers	145.375
Ontario	Sam Mooibroek	136.750
Alberta	Kevin Koe	127.125
Ontario	Scott Howard	121.750
Manitoba	Braden Calvert	109.500
Ontario	Mark Kean	95.500
Nova Scotia	Owen Purcell	92.625
Saskatchewan	Dustin Kalthoff	91.625
Quebec	Félix Asselin	83.000
Ontario	Jayden King	82.250
Alberta	Evan Van Amsterdam	81.125
British Columbia	Brent Pierce	78.750
Saskatchewan	Kelly Knapp	71.813
Ontario	Jonathan Beuk	70.750
Manitoba	Brett Walter	64.375
Ontario	Alex Champ	60.063
Saskatchewan	Steve Laycock	55.938
Ontario	Landan Rooney	54.938

Women
Member Association	Skip	Points
Ontario	Rachel Homan	510.000
Manitoba	Kerri Einarson	303.750
Alberta	Kayla Skrlik	200.625
Nova Scotia	Christina Black	184.000
Manitoba	Kaitlyn Lawes	149.500
British Columbia	Corryn Brown	135.938
Manitoba	Kate Cameron	127.875
Manitoba	Beth Peterson	121.875
British Columbia	Kayla MacMillan	118.563
Ontario	Danielle Inglis	102.563
Alberta	Selena Sturmay	85.375
Quebec	Laurie St-Georges	84.938
Saskatchewan	Ashley Thevenot	83.750
Northern Ontario	Krista McCarville	82.750
Alberta	Myla Plett	79.625
Saskatchewan	Nancy Martin	76.375
Saskatchewan	Michelle Englot	73.813
British Columbia	Taylor Reese-Hansen	72.063
Manitoba	Chelsea Carey	71.813
Ontario	Chelsea Brandwood	69.625
Saskatchewan	Penny Barker	68.875
Alberta	Nicky Kaufman	68.688
Manitoba	Kristy Watling	59.813
Northern Ontario	Emma Artichuk	59.250
Alberta	Serena Gray-Withers	57.313

=== 2025–26 ===
Men
Member Association	Skip	Points
Alberta	Brad Jacobs	444.850
Manitoba	Matt Dunstone	422.000
Northern Ontario	John Epping	249.900
Saskatchewan	Mike McEwen	182.775
Alberta	Evan van Amsterdam	176.500
Alberta	Kevin Koe	169.800
Ontario	Jayden King	158.250
Manitoba	Braden Calvert	144.000
Newfoundland and Labrador	Brad Gushue	143.000
Ontario	Sam Mooibroek	139.025
Manitoba	Jordon McDonald	138.975
Saskatchewan	Rylan Kleiter	123.900
Ontario	Mark Kean	122.963
Manitoba	Reid Carruthers	120.413
Saskatchewan	Kelly Knapp	107.950
British Columbia	Matthew Blandford	99.413
Ontario	Scott Howard	98.125
British Columbia	Cameron de Jong	97.100
Alberta	Johnson Tao	93.638
Quebec	Jean-Michel Ménard	92.475
Saskatchewan	Dustin Kalthoff	73.000
New Brunswick	James Grattan	68.875
Manitoba	Tanner Lott	66.025
Manitoba	Brett Walter	64.025
Ontario	Michael Fournier	62.463

Women
Member Association	Skip	Points
Ontario	Rachel Homan	499.550
Manitoba	Kerri Einarson	339.850
Manitoba	Kaitlyn Lawes	191.050
British Columbia	Taylor Reese-Hansen	172.050
Alberta	Serena Gray-Withers	167.725
Nova Scotia	Christina Black	156.888
British Columbia	Kayla MacMillan	134.738
Alberta	Selena Sturmay	130.050
British Columbia	Corryn Brown	119.275
Manitoba	Beth Peterson	117.738
Ontario	Hailey Armstrong	102.813
Ontario	Hollie Duncan	96.863
Manitoba	Kate Cameron	96.563
Ontario	Chelsea Principi	85.688
Saskatchewan	Jolene Campbell	78.450
Alberta	Gracelyn Richards	77.038
Ontario	Emma Artichuk	74.850
Ontario	Danielle Inglis	74.038
Quebec	Laurie St-Georges	72.138
Northern Ontario	Krista Scharf	71.775
Saskatchewan	Ashley Thevenot	71.275
Saskatchewan	Sara Miller	67.350
Saskatchewan	Nancy Martin	66.688
Saskatchewan	Penny Barker	66.400
Manitoba	Lisa McLeod	65.075

== See also ==
- The Brier
- Tournament of Hearts
- World Curling Tour
