= 2003 Players' Championship =

Grand Slam of Curling event

The 2003 Pharmassist Players' Championship was held February 8–23 at the Black Gold Centre in Leduc, Alberta. It was the final Grand Slam event of the 2002-03 World Curling Tour.

The total purse for the event was $150,000 with $50,000 going to the winning team, which would be Jeff Stoughton's Winnipeg rink. He defeated John Morris' Stayner, Ontario rink in the final.

The event format was a triple knock out followed by an 8-team playoff.

The event was televised on Rogers Sportsnet.

== Teams entered ==
- (Alberta) Adrian Bakker
- (Manitoba) Dave Boehmer
- (Manitoba) David Bohn
- (Scotland) Tom Brewster
- (United States) Craig Brown
- (Manitoba) Kerry Burtnyk
- (Quebec) Martin Ferland
- (Saskatchewan) Glen Despins
- (Manitoba) Dale Duguid
- (British Columbia) Bert Gretzinger
- (Newfoundland and Labrador) Brad Gushue
- (Manitoba) Al Hackner
- (Saskatchewan) Jeff Hartung
- (Ontario) Glenn Howard
- (Alberta) Jamie King
- (Alberta) Kevin Koe
- (Saskatchewan) Bruce Korte
- (Manitoba) Allan Lyburn
- (Manitoba) William Lyburn
- (Alberta) Kevin Martin
- (British Columbia) Greg McAulay
- (Ontario) Wayne Middaugh
- (Ontario) John Morris
- (Alberta) Kevin Park
- (British Columbia) Jay Peachey
- (Manitoba) Vic Peters
- (British Columbia) Brent Pierce
- (Switzerland) Andreas Schwaller
- (Saskatchewan) Jeff Sharp
- (Ontario) Peter Steski
- (Manitoba) Jeff Stoughton
- (Norway) Pal Trulsen

== Playoffs ==
Quarterfinals
(Ontario) Glenn Howard	5
(Ontario) John Morris	9
(Saskatchewan) Glen Despins	9
(Manitoba) Dave Boehmer	4
(Manitoba) Jeff Stoughton	7
(Manitoba) Vic Peters	6
(British Columbia) Bert Gretzinger	4
(Alberta) Kevin Park	6

Semifinals
(Ontario) John Morris	9
(Saskatchewan) Glen Despins	5
(Manitoba) Jeff Stoughton	8
(Alberta) Kevin Park	1

Finals
(Ontario) John Morris	3
(Manitoba) Jeff Stoughton	8
