= 2004 Players' Championship =

Grand Slam of Curling event

The 2004 PharmAssist Players' Championship was held March 31 – April 4 at the Mile One Stadium in St. John's, Newfoundland and Labrador.

The total purse for the event was $150,000 with $43,000 going to the winning team, which would be John Morris' Calgary rink. He defeated his cross-provincial counterparts from Edmonton, the Kevin Martin rink, whose team earned $24,000.

== Draw ==
=== Pool A ===
Skip	Wins	Losses
(Alberta) Kevin Martin	4	1
(Newfoundland and Labrador) Mark Noseworthy	3	2
(Saskatchewan) Pat Simmons	3	2
(Scotland) Tom Brewster	2	3
(Alberta) Kevin Park	2	3
(Ontario) Wayne Middaugh	1	4

=== Pool B ===
Skip	Wins	Losses
(Manitoba) Jeff Stoughton	5	0
(Newfoundland and Labrador) Brad Gushue	3	2
(Alberta) John Morris	3	2
(Manitoba) Dave Boehmer	2	3
(Alberta) Jamie King	1	4
(Switzerland) Ralph Stöckli	1	4

=== Pool C ===
Skip	Wins	Losses
(Saskatchewan) Brad Heidt	4	1
(Saskatchewan) Glen Despins	3	2
(Quebec) Guy Hemmings	3	2
(Manitoba) Kerry Burtnyk	2	3
(Ontario) Glenn Howard	2	3
(United States) Craig Brown	1	4

== Tie breakers ==
- (Quebec) Guy Hemmings 5-0 (Newfoundland and Labrador) Brad Gushue

== Playoffs ==
Quarterfinals
(Manitoba) Jeff Stoughton	9
(Newfoundland and Labrador) Mark Noseworthy	1
(Alberta) John Morris	8
(Saskatchewan) Pat Simmons	5
(Saskatchewan) Brad Heidt
(Saskatchewan) Glen Despins
(Alberta) Kevin Martin	5
(Quebec) Guy Hemmings	2

Semifinals
(Manitoba) Jeff Stoughton	6
(Alberta) John Morris	7
(Saskatchewan) Brad Heidt	7
(Alberta) Kevin Martin	10

Final
(Alberta) John Morris	7
(Alberta) Kevin Martin	6
Third place
(Manitoba) Jeff Stoughton	6
(Saskatchewan) Brad Heidt	4
