= 2005 Players' Championship =

Grand Slam of Curling event

The 2005 PharmAssist Players' Championship was held March 23–27 at the Mile One Centre in St. John's, Newfoundland and Labrador. It would be the final Championship featuring just a men's event.

The total purse for the event was $150,000 with $50,000 going to the winning team, which would be Kevin Martin's Edmonton rink. He defeated the hometown rink of Brad Gushue, whose team earned $30,000.

== Draw ==
=== Pool A ===
Skip	Wins	Losses
(Alberta) Kevin Martin	5	0
(Saskatchewan) Glen Despins	4	1
(British Columbia) Pat Ryan	3	2
(Ontario) Wayne Middaugh	2	3
(Norway) Pal Trulsen	1	4
(Nova Scotia) Mark Dacey	0	5

=== Pool B ===
Skip	Wins	Losses
(Scotland) Tom Brewster	4	1
(Ontario) Glenn Howard	4	1
(Switzerland) Ralph Stöckli	3	2
(Manitoba) Dave Boehmer	2	3
(New Brunswick) Russ Howard	1	4
(Newfoundland and Labrador) Mark Noseworthy	1	4

=== Pool C ===
Skip	Wins	Losses
(Newfoundland and Labrador) Brad Gushue	4	1
(United States) Pete Fenson	3	2
(Manitoba) Jeff Stoughton	3	2
(Alberta) John Morris	2	3
(Saskatchewan) Pat Simmons	2	3
(Sweden) Peja Lindholm	1	4

== Tie breakers ==
- (Switzerland) Ralph Stöckli 6-5 (British Columbia) Pat Ryan
- (United States) Pete Fenson 7-6 (Manitoba) Jeff Stoughton
- (Manitoba) Jeff Stoughton 6-2 (British Columbia) Pat Ryan

== Playoffs ==
Quarterfinals
(Alberta) Kevin Martin	9
(Manitoba) Jeff Stoughton	8
(Saskatchewan) Glen Despins	6
(Scotland) Tom Brewster	5
(Newfoundland and Labrador) Brad Gushue	9
(Switzerland) Ralph Stöckli	8
(Ontario) Glenn Howard	9
(United States) Pete Fenson	7

Semifinals
(Alberta) Kevin Martin	8
(Saskatchewan) Glen Despins	5
(Newfoundland and Labrador) Brad Gushue	7
(Ontario) Glenn Howard	6

Final
(Alberta) Kevin Martin	6
(Newfoundland and Labrador) Brad Gushue	2
