= 2001 Telus Canadian Open =

Grand Slam of Curling event

The 2001 Telus Canadian Open curling men's Grand Slam tournament was held December 13–16, 2001 at the Peace Memorial Multiplex in Wainwright, Alberta.

It was the very first Grand Slam event ever, with the Slam series beginning that season. The event featured a purse of $100,000 with the winning team receiving $30,000.

Telus was brought on as a sponsor in late November. It was originally planned to feature 32 teams, but was reduced to 24 due to the reluctance of some tour teams to boycott playdowns for the Brier, due to an ongoing dispute between the World Curling Players Association and the Canadian Curling Association. Local teams were added to the event at the last minute with the promise of not having to boycott playdowns.

The semifinals and final were televised on Sportsnet.

The final pitted Wayne Middaugh of Midland, Ontario against Jeff Stoughton from Winnipeg. Middaugh won the match 8–7.

The event was seen as a success for the fledgling tour. World Curling Tour executive director Chad McMullan (who also competed in event) indicated that the event had near-sellout crowds. It also saw a television audience of 250,000, more than twice the average for 10 events Sportsnet aired the previous season, and not far behind the 369,000 average viewership of the 2001 Nokia Brier which aired on rival TSN.

== Teams ==
Teams included 13 of the top 25 teams on the World Curling Players Association ranking system, as well as five local teams. Notable absences were Russ Howard (due to family health problems), Bert Gretzinger and Greg McAulay. Teams that did not boycott the Brier (Randy Ferbey, John Morris and Guy Hemmings) were deemed ineligible.

== Format ==
The event was a 24-team triple-knockout competition.

== Knockout brackets ==
=== A Event ===
Scores:

A	Qualifier 1
(Ontario) Wayne Middaugh	7
(Quebec) Pierre Charette	6
(Ontario) Wayne Middaugh	8
(Alberta) Kevin Park	4
(Manitoba) Dave Boehmer	6
(Alberta) Kevin Park	8
(Ontario) Wayne Middaugh	6
(Manitoba) William Lyburn	1
(Manitoba) Kerry Burtnyk	6
(Manitoba) William Lyburn	9
(Manitoba) William Lyburn	6
(Saskatchewan) Glen Despins	1
(Saskatchewan) Glen Despins	9
(Manitoba) Mert Thompsett	2

Quarterfinals
(Alberta) Mell Wells	5
(Alberta) Ken Berg	4
(Manitoba) Allan Lyburn	7
(Alberta) Brad Hannah	5
(Manitoba) Jeff Stoughton	2
(Manitoba) Dale Duguid	8
(Ontario) Glenn Howard	6
(Alberta) Dean Olson	4

Semifinals
(Alberta) Mell Wells	4
(Manitoba) Allan Lyburn	9
(Manitoba) Dale Duguid	3
(Ontario) Glenn Howard	4

Qualifier 2
(Manitoba) Allan Lyburn	3
(Ontario) Glenn Howard	5

Quarterfinals
(Alberta) Kevin Martin	10
(Alberta) Rick Snethum	3
(Ontario) Chad McMullan	9
(Ontario) Scott Patterson	2
(Saskatchewan) Bruce Korte	7
(Alberta) Tim Schneider	6
(Manitoba) Vic Peters	7
(Ontario) Rich Moffatt	6

Semifinals
(Alberta) Kevin Martin	10
(Ontario) Chad McMullan	7
(Saskatchewan) Bruce Korte	6
(Manitoba) Vic Peters	8

Qialifier 3
(Alberta) Kevin Martin	7
(Manitoba) Vic Peters	1

=== B Event ===
Scores:

B	Qualifier 4
(Quebec) Pierre Charette	4
(Manitoba) Dave Boehmer	8
(Ontario) Chad McMullan	4
(Manitoba) Dave Boehmer	5
(Manitoba) Dave Boehmer	7
(Manitoba) Kerry Burtnyk	6
(Saskatchewan) Bruce Korte	6
(Manitoba) Kerry Burtnyk	7
(Manitoba) Kerry Burtnyk	6
(Manitoba) Mert Thompsett	4
(Manitoba) Dave Boehmer	10
(Manitoba) Allan Lyburn	6

B	Qualifier 5
(Alberta) Ken Berg	8
(Alberta) Brad Hannah	7
(Alberta) Kevin Park	9
(Alberta) Ken Berg	8
(Alberta) Kevin Park	5
(Manitoba) Jeff Stoughton	8
(Saskatchewan) Glen Despins	6
(Manitoba) Jeff Stoughton	7
(Manitoba) Jeff Stoughton	8
(Alberta) Dean Olson	4
(Manitoba) Jeff Stoughton	4
(Manitoba) Vic Peters	6

B	Qualifier 6
(Alberta) Rick Snethum	7
(Ontario) Scott Patterson	6
(Alberta) Mell Wells	9
(Alberta) Rick Snethum	1
(Alberta) Mell Wells	2
(Ontario) Rich Moffatt	8
(Manitoba) Dale Duguid	5
(Ontario) Rich Moffatt	10
(Alberta) Tim Schneider	4
(Ontario) Rich Moffatt	10
(Ontario) Rich Moffatt	4
(Manitoba) William Lyburn	11

=== C Event ===
Scores:

C	Qualifier 7
(Ontario) Chad McMullan	2
(Saskatchewan) Bruce Korte	10
(Saskatchewan) Bruce Korte	7
(Saskatchewan) Glen Despins	6
(Alberta) Ken Berg	4
(Saskatchewan) Glen Despins	9
(Saskatchewan) Glen Despins	10
(Alberta) Mell Wells	6
(Saskatchewan) Bruce Korte	1
(Manitoba) Jeff Stoughton	2
(Manitoba) Kerry Burtnyk	8
(Manitoba) Dale Duguid	4
(Alberta) Rick Snethum	6
(Manitoba) Dale Duguid	8
(Manitoba) Kerry Burtnyk	6
(Manitoba) Jeff Stoughton	7

C	Qualifier 8
(Ontario) Rich Moffatt	8
(Manitoba) Mert Thompsett	10
(Manitoba) Mert Thompsett	11
(Quebec) Pierre Charette	6
(Manitoba) Mert Thompsett	8
(Alberta) Kevin Park	2
(Manitoba) Mert Thompsett	1
(Alberta) Brad Hannah	6
(Manitoba) Allan Lyburn	5
(Alberta) Brad Hannah	7
(Alberta) Brad Hannah	8
(Alberta) Dean Olson	3
(Alberta) Brad Hannah	7
(Ontario) Scott Patterson	3
(Ontario) Scott Patterson	8
(Alberta) Tim Schneider	2

== Playoffs ==
The playoff bracket was as follows:

Quarterfinals
(Ontario) Wayne Middaugh	6
(Manitoba) William Lyburn	4
(Ontario) Glenn Howard	7
(Manitoba) Vic Peters	2
(Manitoba) Jeff Stoughton	5
(Manitoba) Dave Boehmer	4
(Alberta) Brad Hannah	5
(Alberta) Kevin Martin	7

Semifinals
(Ontario) Wayne Middaugh	7
(Ontario) Glenn Howard	6
(Manitoba) Jeff Stoughton	9
(Alberta) Kevin Martin	8

Final
(Ontario) Wayne Middaugh	8
(Manitoba) Jeff Stoughton	7

=== Final ===
Team	1	2	3	4	5	6	7	8	9	10	Final
(Ontario) Wayne Middaugh	0	1	0	2	0	2	0	2	0	1	8
(Manitoba) Jeff Stoughton 🔨	3	0	1	0	1	0	2	0	0	0	7
