= 2006 BDO Classic Canadian Open =

Grand Slam of Curling event

The 2006 BDO Classic Canadian Open curling Grand Slam tournament was held January 5–8, 2006 at the MTS Centre in Winnipeg, Manitoba.

Jeff Stoughton and his hometown Winnipeg rink of Jon Mead, Garry Vandenberghe and Steve Gould won his third career Grand Slam event, defeating Calgary's John Morris rink in the final.

== Round-robin standings ==
Final round-robin standings

Key
Teams to Playoffs
Teams to Tiebreakers

Pool A	W	L
(Alberta) Randy Ferbey	4	0
(Alberta) John Morris	3	1
(Newfoundland and Labrador) Brad Gushue	2	2
(United States) Pete Fenson	1	3
(Manitoba) Ryan Fry	0	4

Pool B	W	L
(Alberta) Kevin Martin	4	0
(British Columbia) Pat Ryan	3	1
(Manitoba) Jeff Stoughton	2	2
(Norway) Pål Trulsen	1	3
(Alberta) Mark Johnson	0	4

Pool C	W	L
(Saskatchewan) Bruce Korte	4	0
(Quebec) Pierre Charette	2	2
(Manitoba) Dave Boehmer	2	2
(Manitoba) Randy Dutiaume	1	3
(Ontario) Glenn Howard	1	3

== Tie breaker ==
- (Manitoba) Dave Boehmer 5-2 (Newfoundland and Labrador) Brad Gushue

== Playoffs ==
Quarterfinals
(Alberta)	Randy Ferbey	10
(Quebec)	Pierre Charette	4
(Alberta)	John Morris	10
(British Columbia)	Pat Ryan	7
(Alberta)	Kevin Martin	7
(Manitoba)	Dave Boehmer	6
(Saskatchewan)	Bruce Korte	3
(Manitoba)	Jeff Stoughton	10

Semifinals
(Alberta)	Randy Ferbey	5
(Alberta)	John Morris	7
(Alberta)	Kevin Martin	5
(Manitoba)	Jeff Stoughton	6

Final
(Alberta)	John Morris	6
(Manitoba)	Jeff Stoughton	7
