= Glen Despins =

Canadian curler (1964–2020)

Glen Despins (April 19, 1964 – October 1, 2020) was a Canadian curler from Regina, Saskatchewan. Despins was a two-time Saskatchewan men's champion, representing his province at the 1996 and 1998 Labatt Briers, Canada's national men's curling championship. He was also the winner of 2003 Canadian Open Grand Slam event.

== Career ==
Despins joined team Rod Montgomery in 1995, playing third for the rink. The team won two Pool Tankards (the Saskatchewan men's curling championship) together. The team first won in 1996 in their first season together. Representing Saskatchewan at the 1996 Labatt Brier, the team finished the round robin with a 5–6 record. The team won the Pool Tankard again in 1998, and represented Saskatchewan at the 1998 Labatt Brier. There, they had more success, finishing the round robin with a 7–4 record. They won their tiebreaker match against British Columbia's Greg McAulay rink to get into the playoffs, where they lost to Manitoba's Dale Duguid team in the 3 vs. 4 game.

Despins would eventually take over as skip in the 1999, and was active on the World Curling Tour. He was one of the "original 18" skips of the Grand Slam series that boycotted the Brier in the early 2000s. At the time, he was the president of the Saskatchewan Curling Players Association. His lone Grand Slam title came at the 2003 Canadian Open with teammates Montgomery, Phillip Germain and Dwayne Mihalicz. Among his wins on the tour include the 1999 DirectWest Charity Superspiel, the 1999 Point Optical Charity Classic, the 2002 Best Western Wayside Inn Classic, the 2004 SGI Canada Charity Classic and the 2005 Point Optical Charity Classic.

Later on in his career, Despins won the 2015 Saskatchewan Senior men's championship. Skipping a team of Brad Law, Mihalicz and Peter Thiele, he led Saskatchewan to an eighth-place finish at the 2015 Canadian Senior Curling Championships.

== Personal life ==
Despins was born in Prince Albert, Saskatchewan. He was married and had two children. He was employed as a health and safety officer with Saskatchewan Property Management. He died in a car accident south of Osler, Saskatchewan in 2020.

== Grand Slam Record ==
Key
C	Champion
F	Lost in Final
SF	Lost in Semifinal
QF	Lost in Quarterfinals
R16	Lost in the round of 16
Q	Did not advance to playoffs
T2	Played in Tier 2 event
DNP	Did not participate in event
N/A	Not a Grand Slam event that season

Event	2001–02	2002–03	2003–04	2004–05
Canadian Open	Q	Q	C	DNP
Masters	Q	QF	Q	Q
The National	Q	QF	Q	Q
Players' Championships	QF	SF	QF	SF
