= Jeff Stoughton =

Canadian curler (born 1963)

- Curler
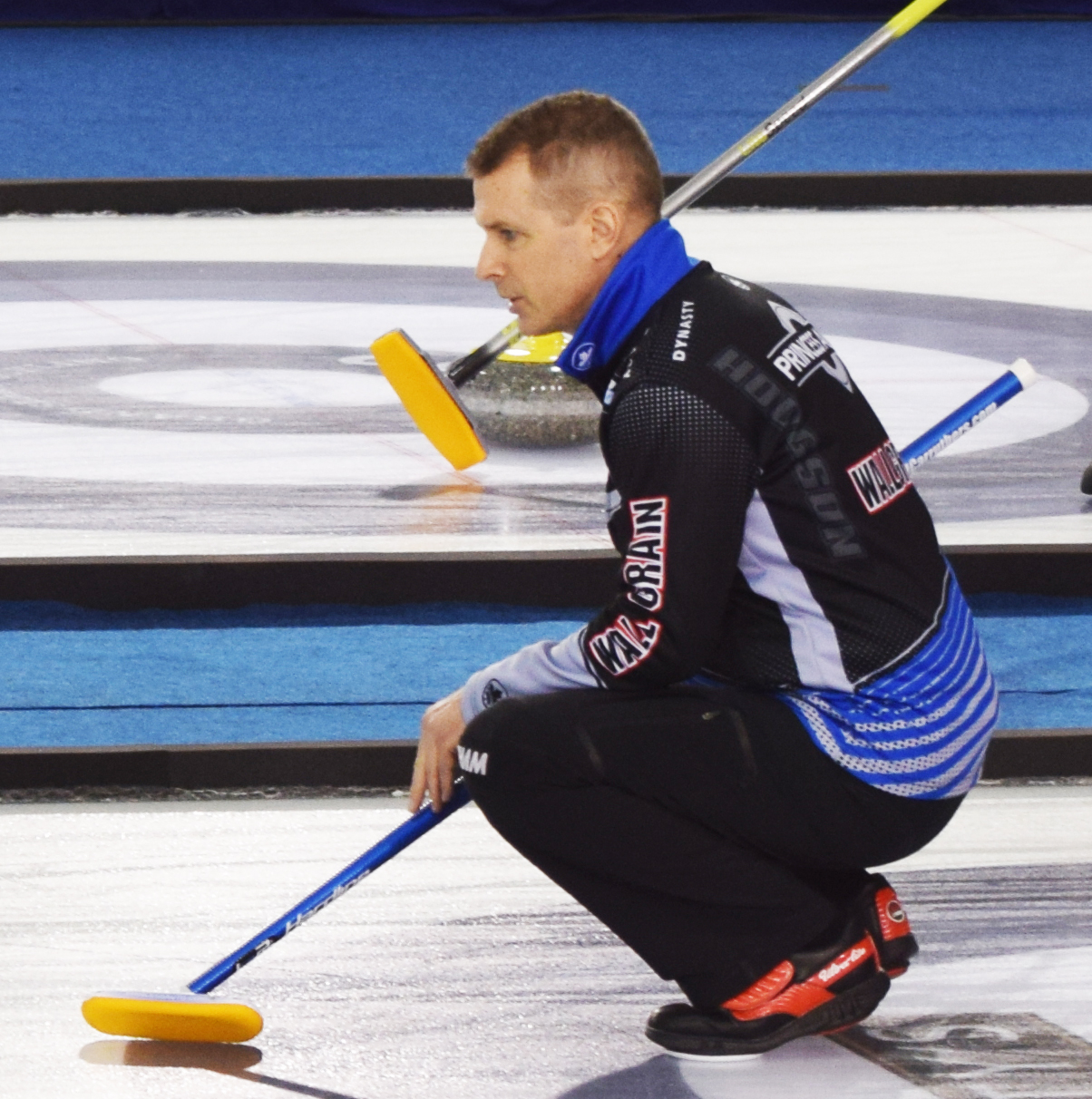
- Stoughton in 2018
- Born: July 26, 1963 (age 63); Winnipeg, Manitoba, Canada

Curling career
- Brier: 11 (1991, 1996, 1999, 2000, 2006, 2007, 2009, 2010, 2011, 2013, 2014)
- Top CTRS ranking: 1st (2003-04, 2012-13)
- Grand Slam victories: 4: Masters (2004); Canadian Open (2006); Player's (2003); The National (2013)
Medal record
Men's curling
Representing Canada
World Championships
Gold medal – first place	1996 Hamilton
Gold medal – first place	2011 Regina
Silver medal – second place	1999 Saint John
Representing Manitoba
Canadian Olympic Trials
Silver medal – second place	2005 Halifax
Bronze medal – third place	2009 Edmonton
Tim Hortons Brier
Gold medal – first place	1996 Kamloops
Gold medal – first place	1999 Edmonton
Gold medal – first place	2011 London
Silver medal – second place	2009 Calgary
Silver medal – second place	2013 Edmonton
Bronze medal – third place	2007 Hamilton
Bronze medal – third place	2014 Kamloops

Jeffrey R. Stoughton (born July 26, 1963) is a Canadian retired curler. He is a three-time Brier champion and two-time World champion as skip. Curling throughout his career out of the Charleswood Curling Club, Stoughton retired from competitive curling in 2015. Following his career, he served the National Men's Coach and Program Manager for Curling Canada, as well as being the head coach of the Canadian Mixed Doubles National Team.

== Career ==
Stoughton's first national championship came in 1988 when he won the Canadian Mixed Curling Championship. He won the mixed once again in 1991. 1991 was the same year Stoughton attended his first Brier. His team of Dave Iverson, Ken Tresoor and Garry VanDenBerghe finished 6-5. Five years later, at the 1996 Labatt Brier, Stoughton and his team of Tresoor, VanDenBerghe, and Steve Gould went all the way, losing only two games en route to the championship, defeating Kevin Martin of Alberta in the final. At the subsequent World Championship, Stoughton went on to lose just one game, winning the Championship against Warwick Smith of Scotland. At the 1997 Olympic Curling Trials, Jeff and his play played well, but narrowly missed the playoffs at 5-4.

Stoughton would return to the 1999 Labatt Brier with 2 new players, Jon Mead and Doug Armstrong replacing Tresoor and Gould. The team went 10-3 winning in the final against Guy Hemmings of Quebec. However, at the 1999 Worlds, Stoughton's team would not be as successful as they were in 1996. The team went 9-2, but one of their losses was in the final against Hammy McMillan of Scotland. Stoughton and his Manitoba four-some returned to the 2000 Labatt Brier. The team, who had an excellent round robin, would bow out in the first game of the playoffs, and finish with a 9-4 record. At the 2001 Olympic Curling Trials, the team would for the second straight time miss the playoffs by just 1 game, going 5-4.

At the 2005 Olympic Curling Trials, Stoughton would come the closest he ever would to reaching the Olympics. He finished the round robin in 2nd place behind the Brad Gushue rink (skipped for this event by Russ Howard throwing second stones), and defeated then John Morris in the semifinal. In the final, Gushue made a steal of two in the 4th end which put Stoughton in a 6-2 hole, which proved to be costly. Stoughton was unable to score the needed second point in the 10th end to tie the match, leading him to lose by a final score of 8-7. Following this loss, Stoughton's third, Jon Mead took a four year break from curling (after the upcoming 2006 Brier).

After a long break between Briers, in large part due to the conflict between the new Grand Slam of Curling and the Canadian Curling Association, which made Grand Slam participants ineligible for the Brier playdowns for several years, Stoughton reached the 2006 Tim Hortons Brier with Mead, Van Den Berghe, and Gould by winning the 2006 Manitoba championship, beating Reid Carruthers in the final. At the Brier however, the team finished in sixth place with a record of 6-5, missing the playoffs. This would be the final competitive event for longtime Stoughton second Van Den Berghe who retired. Stoughton would win the 2007 Manitoba Championship with a new lineup of Ryan Fry, Rob Fowler, and Gould, defeating Peter Nicholls in the final. The team would go on to win a bronze medal at the 2007 Brier. He fared better than the previous year, but fell in the semifinal to eventual world champion Glenn Howard of Ontario, eliminating Kevin Martin in the 3-4 game; Howard held a four-point lead after nine ends, and Stoughton was ready to concede the game; however, CBC, who was broadcasting the game, requested that the tenth end be played for airtime reasons; the two teams ended up throwing all the stones through the house in the tenth end.

Following the 2007-08 season, Ryan Fry left Team Stoughton to join Brad Gushue's rink. Fry was replaced with Kevin Park for the 2008-09 season. The move proved to be fairly successful, as Stoughton led his new team to the final of the 2009 Tim Hortons Brier in which they lost to Kevin Martin.

Stoughton's rink qualified for the 2009 Canadian Olympic Curling Trials. The team finished third, after losing to Glenn Howard's rink in the semi-final. In February 2010 Jeff Stoughton won his 8th Manitoba provincial championship, a record for that province. At the 2010 Tim Hortons Brier, Stoughton finished out of the playoffs despite a 7-4 record.

In April 2010 Rob Fowler and Kevin Park quit the team and both decided to skip their own teams for 2010-2011. Jeff brought back his past longtime third Jon Mead, while also acquiring Reid Carruthers to play at second.

With a new team of Jon Mead and Reid Carruthers, Stoughton won the 2011 Safeway Championship in Manitoba to qualify for the 2011 Tim Hortons Brier. There in London, Ontario, the team finished second in the round robin and went on to defeat Glenn Howard in the final 8-6, capturing Stoughton's third Brier championship. Stoughton and his team also did well at the world championships, finishing first in the round robin and defeating Scotland's Tom Brewster a total of three times to win his second world title. After was the second World title for both Stoughton and Gould, but after many years the first World title for Jon Mead.

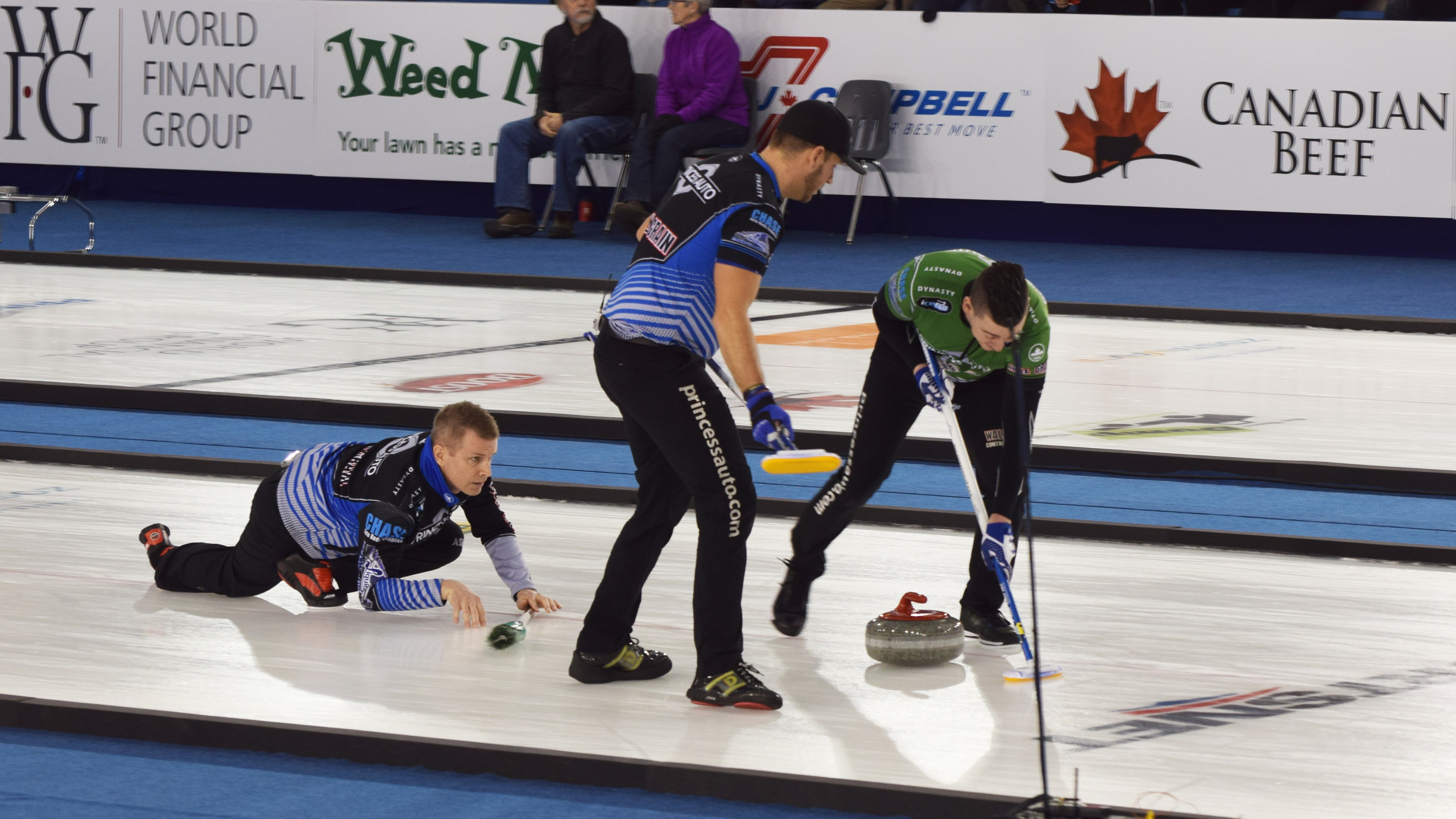
Stoughton throwing a rock at the 2018 Elite 10 Grand Slam curling event in Winnipeg, Manitoba.

Stoughton failed to reach the 2012 Tim Hortons Brier after losing to eventual provincial champion Rob Fowler in the quarterfinals of the 2012 Safeway Championship. A few weeks later, Stoughton dropped lead Steve Gould from his team. It was then announced in May 2012 that Mark Nichols would join the team for the next season as lead.

Stoughton won his first Canada Cup in 2012, defeating Glenn Howard's rink in the final. This gave his team a berth in the 2013 Canadian Olympic Curling Trials in his hometown of Winnipeg. Later in the season, Stoughton won the 2013 The National, completing a career Grand Slam. He qualified for his 10th Brier of his career by winning the 2013 Safeway Championship. At the 2013 Tim Hortons Brier, Stoughton led his Manitoba rink to an 8-3 round robin record. The team managed to make it to the final against Northern Ontario's Brad Jacobs whom they lost to.

At the 2013 Olympic Trials, Stoughton's team finished the round robin with a 3-4 record, missing the playoffs. The team would win another Manitoba championship in 2014, earning the rink a trip to the 2014 Tim Hortons Brier. At the Brier, the team finished the round robin in a three-way time for first place with a 9-2 record. After losing to Quebec in the 3 vs. 4 match, they beat them in a re-match to claim the bronze medal.

Despite retiring in 2015, Stoughton has made occasional returns to professional events in cameo roles. He participated in the 2017 Elite 10 Grand Slam event and returned to play the March 2018 Elite 10 curling event with Carruthers. There he skipped the team while throwing third stones, though the team failed to qualify for the playoffs.

=== Coaching ===
Following his retirement in 2015 as a professional curler, Stoughton served as a coach for Team Canada's mixed doubles at the 2018 Winter Olympics in Pyeongchang, Korea. He would serve as coach for Kaitlyn Lawes and John Morris as they won the Olympic gold medal. As of 2026, he served as Curling Canada's men's and mixed doubles national coach and program manager.

== Career statistics ==
=== Grand Slam record ===
Key
C	Champion
F	Lost in Final
SF	Lost in Semifinal
QF	Lost in Quarterfinals
R16	Lost in the round of 16
Q	Did not advance to playoffs
T2	Played in Tier 2 event
DNP	Did not participate in event
N/A	Not a Grand Slam event that season

Event	2001–02	2002–03	2003–04	2004–05	2005–06	2006–07	2007–08	2008–09	2009–10	2010–11	2011–12	2012–13	2013–14	2014–15	2015–16	2016–17	2017–18
Masters	Q	Q	F	C	QF	Q	Q	SF	DNP	F	QF	QF	SF	QF	DNP	DNP	DNP
The National	QF	QF	F	F	QF	DNP	SF	QF	QF	F	QF	C	Q	Q	DNP	DNP	DNP
Canadian Open	Q	QF	QF	Q	C	QF	QF	SF	QF	SF	F	QF	SF	Q	DNP	DNP	DNP
Elite 10	N/A	N/A	N/A	N/A	N/A	N/A	N/A	N/A	N/A	N/A	N/A	N/A	N/A	DNP	DNP	QF (Note: Stoughton was invited to skip a select team of inactive/retired curlers in this event.)	Q (Note: Stoughton threw third stones and skipped the Reid Carruthers rink.)
Players'	Q	C	SF	QF	Q	Q	Q	QF	SF	QF	Q	SF	Q	Q	DNP	DNP	Q

=== Teams ===
Season	Skip	Third	Second	Lead
1990–91	Jeff Stoughton	Dave Iverson	Ken Tresoor	Garry Vandenberghe
1994–95	Jeff Stoughton	Jeff Ryan	Garry Vandenberghe	Darryl Gunnlaugson
1995–96	Jeff Stoughton	Ken Tresoor	Garry Vandenberghe	Steve Gould
1996–97	Jeff Stoughton	Ken Tresoor	Garry Vandenberghe	Steve Gould
1998–99	Jeff Stoughton	Jon Mead	Garry Vandenberghe	Doug Armstrong
1999–00	Jeff Stoughton	Jon Mead	Garry Vandenberghe	Doug Armstrong
2000–01	Jeff Stoughton	Jon Mead	Garry Vandenberghe	Doug Armstrong
2001–02	Jeff Stoughton	Jon Mead	Garry Vandenberghe	Doug Armstrong
2002–03	Jeff Stoughton	Jon Mead	Garry Vandenberghe	Jim Spencer
2003–04	Jeff Stoughton	Jon Mead	Garry Vandenberghe	Steve Gould
2004–05	Jeff Stoughton	Jon Mead	Garry Vandenberghe	Steve Gould
2005–06	Jeff Stoughton	Jon Mead	Garry Vandenberghe	Steve Gould
2006–07	Jeff Stoughton	Ryan Fry	Rob Fowler	Steve Gould
2007–08	Jeff Stoughton	Ryan Fry	Rob Fowler	Steve Gould
2008–09	Jeff Stoughton	Kevin Park	Rob Fowler	Steve Gould
2009–10	Jeff Stoughton	Kevin Park	Rob Fowler	Steve Gould
2010–11	Jeff Stoughton	Jon Mead	Reid Carruthers	Steve Gould
2011–12	Jeff Stoughton	Jon Mead	Reid Carruthers	Steve Gould
2012–13	Jeff Stoughton	Jon Mead	Reid Carruthers	Mark Nichols
2013–14	Jeff Stoughton	Jon Mead	Reid Carruthers	Mark Nichols
2013–14	Jeff Stoughton	Jon Mead	Mark Nichols	Reid Carruthers
2014–15	Jeff Stoughton	Rob Fowler	Alex Forrest	Connor Njegovan

== Personal life ==
Stoughton was a financial systems manager for Air Canada, he has since retired. He is married to Hali Weiss, and they have a daughter, Elizabeth and two sons, Riley and Cole. Stoughton was known for his 360° "spin-o-rama" delivery, where he comes out of the hack, spins around and then throws the rock. Stoughton does this to entertain fans, but does not usually do it during games, except for meaningless shots. He also performed the move in a cameo appearance in the 2002 film Men With Brooms.

== Honours ==
Stoughton was inducted into the Manitoba Sports Hall of Fame in June 2018.
