= Open (curling) =

Annual curling tournament held in Canada

GSOC Open
- Established: 2001
- 2026 host city: Thunder Bay, Ontario
- 2026 arena: Fort William Gardens
- Men's purse: CAD $200,000
- Women's purse: CAD $200,000

Current champions (2025)
- Men: (Switzerland) Yannick Schwaller
- Women: (Switzerland) Silvana Tirinzoni

Current edition
- 2026 GSOC Open

The Open, previously known as the Canadian Open until 2026, is an annual bonspiel, or curling tournament. It is one of the five Grand Slams and four "majors" on the men's and women's curling tours. A women's event was introduced in the 2014–15 curling season.

In 2021, when it was supposed to be held outside of Canada for the first time, it was going to just be called the Open. However, the event was not held in 2021 and 2022 due to the COVID-19 pandemic. In 2023, the event was named the Co-op Canadian open for sponsorship reasons.

The event features 16 men's and women's teams. The top 16 teams on the World Curling team ranking system qualify.

Since 2024, the event features four groups of four teams each. Each team plays everyone in their pool once, plus a crossover game against a team in another pool.

In 2025, a Tier 2 event was added.

== Event names ==
- Telus Canadian Open: 2001
- M&M Meat Shops Canadian Open: 2002
- Canadian Open: 2003, 2005
- BDO Classic Canadian Open: 2006, 2007 (Dec)
- BDO Classic Canadian Open of Curling: 2007 (Jan)
- BDO Canadian Open of Curling: 2009–2011
- Canadian Open of Curling: 2012
- Canadian Open: 2013–2014
- Meridian Canadian Open: 2015-2020
- Meridian Open: 2021
- Co-op Canadian Open: 2023–2024
- HearlingLife Canadian Open: 2025
- GSOC Open: 2026

== Past champions ==
=== Men ===
==== Tier 1 ====
Year	Winning team	Runner-up team	Location	Purse
2001	(Ontario) Wayne Middaugh, Graeme McCarrel, Ian Tetley, Scott Bailey	(Manitoba) Jeff Stoughton, Jon Mead, Garry Van Den Berghe, Doug Armstrong	Wainwright, Alberta	$100,000
2002	(Alberta) Kevin Martin, Don Walchuk, Carter Rycroft, Don Bartlett	(Ontario) Glenn Howard, Richard Hart, Collin Mitchell, Jason Mitchell	Thunder Bay, Ontario	$100,000
2003	(Saskatchewan) Glen Despins, Rod Montgomery, Phillip Germain, Dwayne Mihalicz	(Manitoba) Dave Boehmer, Pat Spring, Richard Daneault, Don Harvey	Brandon, Manitoba	$100,000
2005	(Alberta) Kevin Martin, Don Walchuk, Carter Rycroft, Don Bartlett	(Alberta) David Nedohin, Randy Ferbey (skip), Scott Pfeifer, Marcel Rocque	Winnipeg, Manitoba	$100,000
2006	(Manitoba) Jeff Stoughton, Jon Mead, Garry Van Den Berghe, Steve Gould	(Alberta) John Morris, Kevin Koe, Marc Kennedy, Paul Moffatt	Winnipeg, Manitoba	$100,000
2007 (Jan.)	(Alberta) Kevin Martin, John Morris, Marc Kennedy, Ben Hebert	(Alberta) David Nedohin, Randy Ferbey (skip), Scott Pfeifer, Marcel Rocque	Winnipeg, Manitoba	$100,000
2007 (Dec.)	(Alberta) Kevin Martin, John Morris, Marc Kennedy, Ben Hebert	(Nova Scotia) Shawn Adams, Paul Flemming, Craig Burgess, Kelly Mittelstadt	Quebec City, Quebec	$100,000
2009	(Ontario) Glenn Howard, Richard Hart, Brent Laing, Craig Savill	(Alberta) Kevin Martin, John Morris, Marc Kennedy, Ben Hebert	Winnipeg, Manitoba	$100,000
2010	(Alberta) Kevin Martin, John Morris, Marc Kennedy, Ben Hebert	(Ontario) Glenn Howard, Richard Hart, Brent Laing, Craig Savill	Winnipeg, Manitoba	$100,000
2011 (Jan.)	(Manitoba) Mike McEwen, B. J. Neufeld, Matt Wozniak, Denni Neufeld	(Ontario) Glenn Howard, Richard Hart, Brent Laing, Craig Savill	Oshawa, Ontario	$100,000
2011 (Dec.)	(Manitoba) Mike McEwen, B. J. Neufeld, Matt Wozniak, Denni Neufeld	(Manitoba) Jeff Stoughton, Jon Mead, Reid Carruthers, Steve Gould	Kingston, Ontario	$100,000
2012	(Ontario) Glenn Howard, Wayne Middaugh, Brent Laing, Craig Savill	(Ontario) Brad Jacobs, Ryan Fry, E. J. Harnden, Ryan Harnden	Kelowna, British Columbia	$100,000
2013	(Alberta) Kevin Koe, Pat Simmons, Carter Rycroft, Nolan Thiessen	(Newfoundland and Labrador) Brad Gushue, Brett Gallant, Adam Casey, Geoff Walker	Medicine Hat, Alberta	$100,000
2014	(Newfoundland and Labrador) Brad Gushue, Mark Nichols, Brett Gallant, Geoff Walker	(Saskatchewan) Steve Laycock, Kirk Muyres, Colton Flasch, Dallan Muyres	Yorkton, Saskatchewan	$100,000
2015	(Ontario) John Epping, Mat Camm, Patrick Janssen, Tim March	(Newfoundland and Labrador) Brad Gushue, Mark Nichols, Brett Gallant, Geoff Walker	Yorkton, Saskatchewan	$100,000
2017	(Newfoundland and Labrador) Brad Gushue, Mark Nichols, Brett Gallant, Geoff Walker	(Sweden) Niklas Edin, Oskar Eriksson, Rasmus Wranå, Christoffer Sundgren	North Battleford, Saskatchewan	$100,000
2018	(Switzerland) Benoît Schwarz, Claudio Pätz, Peter de Cruz (skip), Valentin Tanner	(Sweden) Niklas Edin, Oskar Eriksson, Rasmus Wranå, Christoffer Sundgren	Camrose, Alberta	$100,000
2019	(Alberta) Brendan Bottcher, Darren Moulding, Bradley Thiessen, Karrick Martin	(Ontario) John Epping, Mat Camm, Brent Laing, Craig Savill	North Battleford, Saskatchewan	$100,000
2020	(Ontario) Brad Jacobs, Marc Kennedy, E. J. Harnden, Ryan Harnden	(Ontario) John Epping, Ryan Fry, Mat Camm, Brent Laing	Yorkton, Saskatchewan	$150,000
2021	Cancelled			
2022	Cancelled			
2023	(Alberta) Brendan Bottcher, Marc Kennedy, Brett Gallant, Ben Hebert	(Sweden) Niklas Edin, Oskar Eriksson, Rasmus Wranå, Christoffer Sundgren	Camrose, Alberta	$150,000
2024 (Jan.)	(Scotland) Bruce Mouat, Grant Hardie, Bobby Lammie, Hammy McMillan Jr.	(Alberta) Brendan Bottcher, Marc Kennedy, Brett Gallant, Ben Hebert	Red Deer, Alberta	$200,000
2024 (Nov.)	(Scotland) Bruce Mouat, Grant Hardie, Bobby Lammie, Hammy McMillan Jr.	(Newfoundland and Labrador) Brad Gushue, Mark Nichols, Brendan Bottcher, Geoff Walker	Nisku, Alberta	$200,000
2025	(Switzerland) Benoît Schwarz-van Berkel, Yannick Schwaller (skip), Sven Michel, Pablo Lachat-Couchepin	(Scotland) Ross Whyte, Robin Brydone, Craig Waddell, Euan Kyle	Saskatoon, Saskatchewan	$200,000
2026			Thunder Bay, Ontario	$

==== Tier 2 ====
Year	Winning team	Runner-up team	Location	Purse
2025	(Norway) Magnus Ramsfjell, Martin Sesaker, Bendik Ramsfjell, Gaute Nepstad	(Switzerland) Michael Brunner, Anthony Petoud, Romano Meier, Andreas Gerlach	Martensville, Saskatchewan	$60,000

=== Women ===
==== Tier 1 ====
Year	Winning team	Runner-up team	Location	Purse
2014	(Scotland) Eve Muirhead, Anna Sloan, Vicki Adams, Sarah Reid	(Ontario) Rachel Homan, Emma Miskew, Joanne Courtney, Lisa Weagle	Yorkton, Saskatchewan	$100,000
2015	(Ontario) Rachel Homan, Emma Miskew, Joanne Courtney, Lisa Weagle	(Manitoba) Jennifer Jones, Kaitlyn Lawes, Jill Officer, Dawn McEwen	Yorkton, Saskatchewan	$100,000
2017	(Alberta) Casey Scheidegger, Cary-Anne McTaggart, Jessie Scheidegger, Stephanie Enright	(Switzerland) Silvana Tirinzoni, Cathy Overton-Clapham, Esther Neuenschwander, Marlene Albrecht	North Battleford, Saskatchewan	$100,000
2018	(Alberta) Chelsea Carey, Cathy Overton-Clapham, Jocelyn Peterman, Laine Peters	(Manitoba) Michelle Englot, Kate Cameron, Leslie Wilson-Westcott, Raunora Westcott	Camrose, Alberta	$100,000
2019	(Ontario) Rachel Homan, Emma Miskew, Joanne Courtney, Lisa Weagle	(Switzerland) Alina Pätz, Silvana Tirinzoni (skip), Esther Neuenschwander, Melanie Barbezat	North Battleford, Saskatchewan	$100,000
2020	(Sweden) Anna Hasselborg, Sara McManus, Agnes Knochenhauer, Sofia Mabergs	(South Korea) Kim Min-ji, Ha Seung-youn, Kim Hye-rin, Kim Su-jin, Yang Tae-i	Yorkton, Saskatchewan	$150,000
2021	Cancelled			
2022	Cancelled			
2023	(Japan) Satsuki Fujisawa, Chinami Yoshida, Yumi Suzuki, Yurika Yoshida	(Manitoba) Kerri Einarson, Val Sweeting, Shannon Birchard, Briane Harris	Camrose, Alberta	$150,000
2024 (Jan.)	(Ontario) Rachel Homan, Tracy Fleury, Emma Miskew, Sarah Wilkes	(Switzerland) Alina Pätz, Silvana Tirinzoni (skip), Selina Witschonke, Carole Howald	Red Deer, Alberta	$200,000
2024 (Nov.)	(Ontario) Rachel Homan, Tracy Fleury, Emma Miskew, Sarah Wilkes	(Switzerland) Alina Pätz, Silvana Tirinzoni (skip), Carole Howald, Selina Witschonke	Nisku, Alberta	$200,000
2025	(Switzerland) Alina Pätz, Silvana Tirinzoni (skip), Carole Howald, Selina Witschonke	(Japan) Satsuki Fujisawa, Chinami Yoshida, Yumi Suzuki, Yurika Yoshida	Saskatoon, Saskatchewan	$200,000
2026			Thunder Bay, Ontario	$

==== Tier 2 ====
Year	Winning team	Runner-up team	Location	Purse
2025	(British Columbia) Taylor Reese-Hansen, Megan McGillivray, Kim Bonneau, Julianna Mackenzie	(Manitoba) Kaitlyn Lawes, Selena Njegovan (Skip), Jocelyn Peterman, Kristin Gordon	Martensville, Saskatchewan	$60,000
