= Players' Cup =

Annual Grand Slam of Curling event

Players' Championship
- Established: 1993
- 2026 host city: Steinbach, Manitoba
- 2026 arena: Southeast Event Centre
- Purse: CAD $175,000

Current champions (2026)
- Men: (Scotland) Ross Whyte
- Women: (Switzerland) Silvana Tirinzoni

Current edition
- 2026 Players' Championship (January)

The Players' Cup, previously known as the Players' Championship, is the final event of the Grand Slam of Curling tour, and is formerly the championship of the World Curling Tour season.

From 2016 to 2019, it was the penultimate slam of the curling season, and the last of the four "majors". The event was one of the original Grand Slam events when they were instituted in the 2001–02 season for men and for the 2005–06 season for women.

== History ==
The event began as the "VO Cup" before the Grand Slam era in 1993, as part of the very first World Curling Tour season. The event was known as the VO Cup for two seasons before title sponsor Seagram's Distillery pulled out. With no sponsor, the 1995 event was saved at the last minute, and continued the next season thanks to a TV deal with TSN.

A women's event was introduced in 2006.

From 2007 to 2009, it was a qualifying tournament for the Canadian Olympic Curling Trials, and had barred foreign teams from entering (unlike the other Slams). Scotland's Eve Muirhead became the first non-Canadian skip to win the event in 2013, while Sweden's Niklas Edin became the first non Canadian skip to win the men's event in 2017.

To date, Edmonton's Kevin Martin has won the most Players' Championships with 8. On the women's side, Winnipeg's Jennifer Jones (and her long-time second, Jill Officer) have won the most championships with 6.

Due to the COVID-19 pandemic, both the 2020 Players' Championship and the 2020 Champions Cup were cancelled.

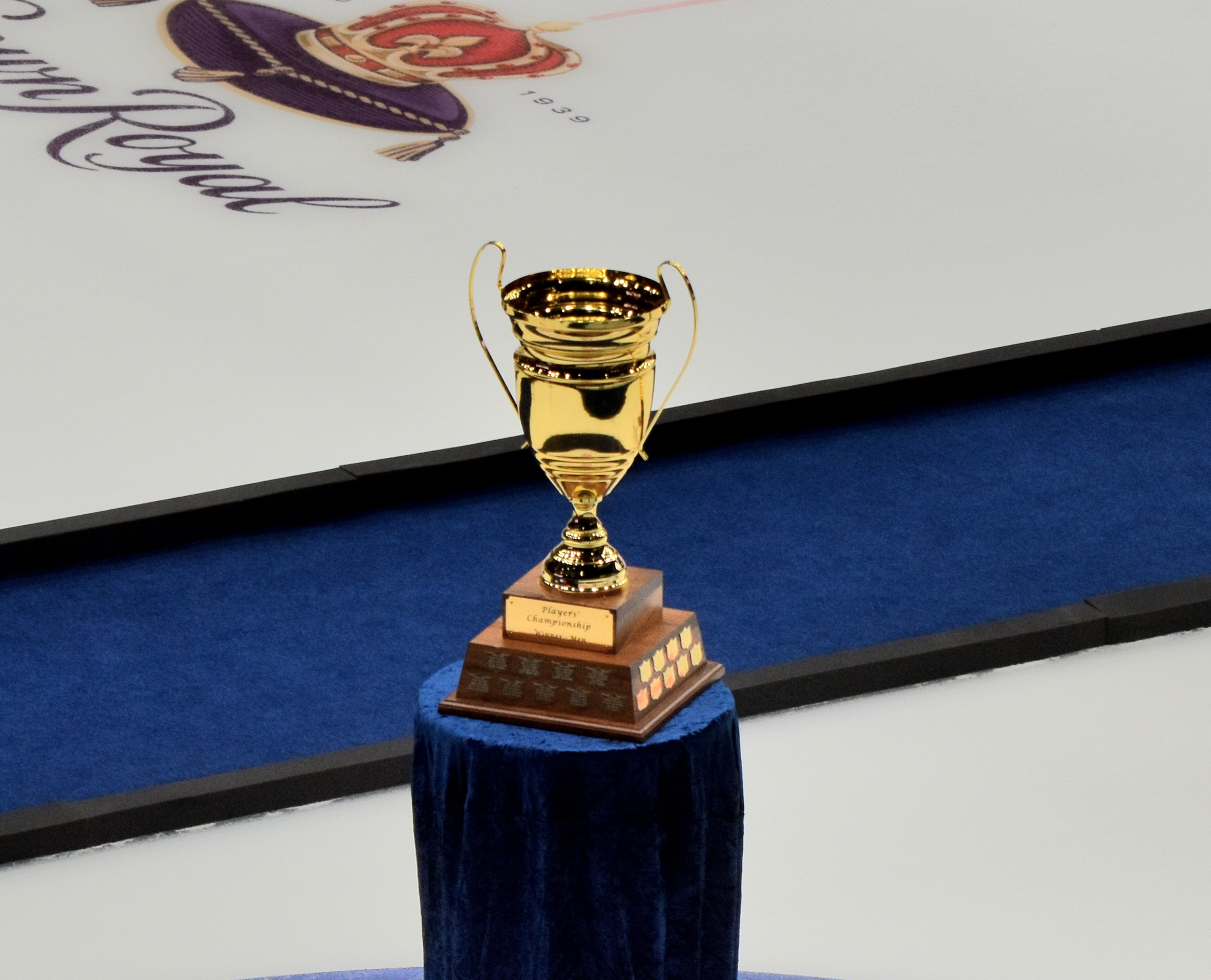
Players' Championship Trophy

== Qualification ==
The top 12 teams on the men's and women's WCT year-to-date rankings respectively qualify for the event. Teams that decline their invitations are replaced by the next highest ranked team.

== Format ==
Since 2023, and from 2014 to 2021, the event featured 12 teams split into two pools of six which compete in a round robin, with the top six teams advancing to a single game elimination playoff. In 2021, the number of teams earning playoff berths was reduced from eight. The 2022 event was a triple knockout.

== Past champions ==
=== Men ===
Year	Winning team	Runner-up team	Location	Purse
1993	(Ontario) Russ Howard, Glenn Howard, Wayne Middaugh, Peter Corner	(Ontario) Paul Savage, Graeme McCarrel, Ian Tetley, Todd Tsukamoto	Calgary, Alberta	$120,000
1994	(Alberta) Kevin Martin, Kevin Park, James Pahl, Don Bartlett	(Ontario) Ed Werenich, John Kawaja, Pat Perroud, Neil Harrison	Calgary, Alberta	$100,000
1995 (Apr.)	(Saskatchewan) Murray McEachern, Rick Schneider, Daryl Nixon, Larry Schneider	(Saskatchewan) Brad Heidt, Mark Dacey, Wayne Charteris, Dan Ormsby	Selkirk, Manitoba	$75,000
1995 (Dec.)	(Ontario) Wayne Middaugh, Graeme McCarrel, Ian Tetley, Scott Bailey	(Manitoba) Dale Duguid, Dan Carey, Russ Hayes, Doug Armstrong	Jasper, Alberta	$106,000
1997	(Ontario) Russ Howard, Glenn Howard, Scott Patterson, Phil Loevenmark	(Saskatchewan) Randy Woytowich, Rick Schneider, Brian McCusker, John Grundy	Winnipeg, Manitoba	$60,000
1998	(Alberta) Kevin Martin, Don Walchuk, Rudy Ramcharan, Marcel Rocque	(Manitoba) Vic Peters, Dave Smith, Chris Neufeld, Don Harvey	Fort McMurray, Alberta	$60,000
1999	(Ontario) Wayne Middaugh, Graeme McCarrel, Ian Tetley, Scott Bailey	(Ontario) Russ Howard, Glenn Howard, Peter Corner, Neil Harrison	Winnipeg, Manitoba	$150,000
2000	(Alberta) Kevin Martin, Don Walchuk, Carter Rycroft, Don Bartlett	(Ontario) Wayne Middaugh, Graeme McCarrel, Ian Tetley, Scott Bailey	Winnipeg, Manitoba	$150,000
2001	(Ontario) Wayne Middaugh, Graeme McCarrel, Ian Tetley, Scott Bailey	(Alberta) Kevin Martin, Don Walchuk, Carter Rycroft, Don Bartlett	Calgary, Alberta	$150,000
2002	(Ontario) Wayne Middaugh, Graeme McCarrel, Ian Tetley, Scott Bailey	(Manitoba) Vic Peters, Mark Olson, Chris Neufeld, Steve Gould	Strathroy, Ontario	$150,000
2003	(Manitoba) Jeff Stoughton, Jon Mead, Garry Van Den Berghe, Jim Spencer	(Ontario) John Morris, Joe Frans, Brent Laing, Craig Savill	Leduc, Alberta	$150,000
2004	(Alberta) John Morris, Kevin Koe, Marc Kennedy, Paul Moffatt	(Alberta) Kevin Martin, Don Walchuk, Carter Rycroft, Don Bartlett	St. John's, Newfoundland and Labrador	$150,000
2005	(Alberta) Kevin Martin, Don Walchuk, Carter Rycroft, Don Bartlett	(Newfoundland and Labrador) Brad Gushue, Mark Nichols, Mike Adam, Jamie Korab	St. John's, Newfoundland and Labrador	$150,000
2006	(Alberta) David Nedohin, Randy Ferbey (skip), Scott Pfeifer, Marcel Rocque	(Alberta) Kevin Martin, Don Walchuk, Carter Rycroft, Adam Enright	Calgary, Alberta	$150,000
2007	(Alberta) Kevin Martin, John Morris, Marc Kennedy, Ben Hebert	(Alberta) Blake MacDonald, Kevin Park, Carter Rycroft, Nolan Thiessen	Calgary, Alberta	$100,000
2008	(Ontario) Glenn Howard, Richard Hart, Brent Laing, Craig Savill	(Alberta) Kevin Martin, John Morris, Marc Kennedy, Ben Hebert	St. John's, Newfoundland	$100,000
2009	(Alberta) David Nedohin, Randy Ferbey (skip), Scott Pfeifer, Marcel Rocque	(Ontario) Glenn Howard, Richard Hart, Brent Laing, Craig Savill	Grande Prairie, Alberta	$100,000
2010	(Alberta) Kevin Martin, John Morris, Marc Kennedy, Ben Hebert	(Newfoundland and Labrador) Brad Gushue, Mark Nichols, Ryan Fry, Jamie Korab	Dawson Creek, British Columbia	$100,000
2011	(Alberta) Kevin Martin, John Morris, Marc Kennedy, Ben Hebert	(Sweden) Niklas Edin, Sebastian Kraupp, Fredrik Lindberg, Viktor Kjäll	Grande Prairie, Alberta	$100,000
2012	(Ontario) John Epping, Scott Bailey, Scott Howard, David Mathers	(Ontario) Glenn Howard, Wayne Middaugh, Brent Laing, Craig Savill	Summerside, Prince Edward Island	$100,000
2013	(Ontario) Glenn Howard, Wayne Middaugh, Brent Laing, Craig Savill	(Manitoba) Mike McEwen, B. J. Neufeld, Matt Wozniak, Denni Neufeld	Toronto, Ontario	$100,000
2014	(Alberta) Kevin Martin, Marc Kennedy, David Nedohin, Ben Hebert	(Ontario) Brad Jacobs, Ryan Fry, E. J. Harnden, Ryan Harnden	Summerside, Prince Edward Island	$100,000
2015	(Ontario) Brad Jacobs, Ryan Fry, E. J. Harnden, Ryan Harnden	(Manitoba) Mike McEwen, B. J. Neufeld, Matt Wozniak, Denni Neufeld	Toronto, Ontario	$100,000
2016	(Newfoundland and Labrador) Brad Gushue, Mark Nichols, Brett Gallant, Geoff Walker	(Ontario) Brad Jacobs, Ryan Fry, E. J. Harnden, Ryan Harnden	Toronto, Ontario	$100,000
2017	(Sweden) Niklas Edin, Oskar Eriksson, Rasmus Wranå, Christoffer Sundgren	(Manitoba) Mike McEwen, B. J. Neufeld, Matt Wozniak, Denni Neufeld	Toronto, Ontario	$150,000
2018	(Alberta) Kevin Koe, Marc Kennedy, Brent Laing, Ben Hebert	(Sweden) Niklas Edin, Oskar Eriksson, Rasmus Wranå, Christoffer Sundgren	Toronto, Ontario	$150,000
2019	(Alberta) Brendan Bottcher, Darren Moulding, Brad Thiessen, Karrick Martin	(Alberta) Kevin Koe, B. J. Neufeld, Colton Flasch, Ben Hebert	Toronto, Ontario	$150,000
2020	Cancelled			
2021	(Scotland) Bruce Mouat, Grant Hardie, Bobby Lammie, Hammy McMillan Jr.	(Newfoundland and Labrador) Brad Gushue, Mark Nichols, Brett Gallant, Geoff Walker	Calgary, Alberta	$175,000
2022	(Scotland) Bruce Mouat, Grant Hardie, Bobby Lammie, Hammy McMillan Jr.	(Sweden) Niklas Edin, Oskar Eriksson, Rasmus Wranå (3 player team)	Toronto, Ontario	$175,000
2023	(Alberta) Kevin Koe, Tyler Tardi, Brad Thiessen, Karrick Martin	(Switzerland) Benoît Schwarz, Yannick Schwaller (skip), Sven Michel, Pablo Lachat	Toronto, Ontario	$175,000
2024	(Newfoundland and Labrador) Brad Gushue, Mark Nichols, E. J. Harnden, Geoff Walker	(Italy) Joël Retornaz, Amos Mosaner, Sebastiano Arman, Mattia Giovanella	Toronto, Ontario	$175,000
2025	(Scotland) Bruce Mouat, Grant Hardie, Bobby Lammie, Hammy McMillan Jr.	(Switzerland) Benoît Schwarz-van Berkel, Yannick Schwaller (skip), Sven Michel, Pablo Lachat	Toronto, Ontario	$175,000
2026 (Jan.)	(Scotland) Ross Whyte, Robin Brydone, Craig Waddell, Euan Kyle	(Scotland) Kyle Waddell, Mark Watt, Angus Bryce, Blair Haswell	Steinbach, Manitoba	$175,000

=== Women ===
Year	Winning team	Runner-up team	Location	Purse
2006	(Manitoba) Jennifer Jones, Cathy Overton-Clapham, Jill Officer, Georgina Wheatcroft	(Alberta) Cheryl Bernard, Susan O'Connor, Carolyn Darbyshire, Cori Bartel	Calgary, Alberta	$100,000
2007	(Manitoba) Jennifer Jones, Cathy Overton-Clapham, Jill Officer, Dawn Askin	(British Columbia) Kelly Scott, Jeanna Schraeder, Sasha Carter, Renee Simons	Calgary, Alberta	$100,000
2008	(Saskatchewan) Amber Holland, Kim Schneider, Tammy Schneider, Heather Seeley	(Ontario) Krista McCarville, Tara George, Kari MacLean-Kraft, Lorraine Lang	St. John's, Newfoundland	$100,000
2009	(Manitoba) Jennifer Jones, Cathy Overton-Clapham, Jill Officer, Dawn Askin	(Alberta) Shannon Kleibrink, Amy Nixon, Bronwen Webster, Chelsey Bell	Grande Prairie, Alberta	$100,000
2010	(Alberta) Cheryl Bernard, Susan O'Connor, Carolyn Darbyshire, Cori Bartel	(Alberta) Crystal Webster, Lori Olson-Johns, Samantha Preston, Stephanie Malekoff	Dawson Creek, British Columbia	$100,000
2011	(Manitoba) Jennifer Jones, Kaitlyn Lawes, Jill Officer, Dawn Askin	(Ontario) Rachel Homan, Emma Miskew, Alison Kreviazuk, Lisa Weagle	Grande Prairie, Alberta	$100,000
2012	(Saskatchewan) Stefanie Lawton, Sherry Anderson, Sherri Singler, Marliese Kasner	(Manitoba) Cathy Overton-Clapham, Jenna Loder, Ashley Howard, Breanne Meakin	Summerside, Prince Edward Island	$100,000
2013	(Scotland) Eve Muirhead, Anna Sloan, Vicki Adams, Claire Hamilton	(Sweden) Maria Prytz, Christina Bertrup, Maria Wennerström, Margaretha Sigfridsson (skip)	Toronto, Ontario	$100,000
2014	(Manitoba) Jennifer Jones, Kaitlyn Lawes, Jill Officer, Dawn McEwen	(Ontario) Rachel Homan, Emma Miskew, Alison Kreviazuk, Lisa Weagle	Summerside, Prince Edward Island	$100,000
2015	(Scotland) Eve Muirhead, Anna Sloan, Vicki Adams, Sarah Reid	(Russia) Anna Sidorova, Margarita Fomina, Alexandra Saitova, Ekaterina Galkina	Toronto, Ontario	$100,000
2016	(Scotland) Eve Muirhead, Cathy Overton-Clapham, Vicki Adams, Sarah Reid	(Manitoba) Jennifer Jones, Kaitlyn Lawes, Jill Officer, Dawn McEwen	Toronto, Ontario	$100,000
2017	(Manitoba) Jennifer Jones, Kaitlyn Lawes, Jill Officer, Dawn McEwen	(Alberta) Val Sweeting, Lori Olson-Johns, Dana Ferguson, Rachelle Brown	Toronto, Ontario	$150,000
2018	(United States) Jamie Sinclair, Alex Carlson, Vicky Persinger, Monica Walker	(Manitoba) Jennifer Jones, Kaitlyn Lawes, Jill Officer, Dawn McEwen	Toronto, Ontario	$150,000
2019	(Manitoba) Kerri Einarson, Val Sweeting, Shannon Birchard, Briane Meilleur	(Sweden) Anna Hasselborg, Sara McManus, Agnes Knochenhauer, Sofia Mabergs	Toronto, Ontario	$150,000
2020	Cancelled			
2021	(Manitoba) Kerri Einarson, Val Sweeting, Shannon Birchard, Briane Meilleur	(Ontario) Rachel Homan, Emma Miskew, Sarah Wilkes, Joanne Courtney	Calgary, Alberta	$175,000
2022	(Sweden) Anna Hasselborg, Sara McManus, Agnes Knochenhauer, Sofia Mabergs	(Manitoba) Kerri Einarson, Val Sweeting, Shannon Birchard, Briane Meilleur	Toronto, Ontario	$175,000
2023	(Sweden) Isabella Wranå, Almida de Val, Maria Larsson, Linda Stenlund	(Switzerland) Alina Pätz, Silvana Tirinzoni (skip), Carole Howald, Briar Schwaller-Hürlimann	Toronto, Ontario	$175,000
2024	(Switzerland) Alina Pätz, Silvana Tirinzoni (skip), Selina Witschonke, Carole Howald	(Sweden) Isabella Wranå, Almida de Val, Maria Larsson, Linda Stenlund	Toronto, Ontario	$175,000
2025	(Switzerland) Alina Pätz, Silvana Tirinzoni (skip), Carole Howald, Selina Witschonke	(Ontario) Rachel Homan, Tracy Fleury, Emma Miskew, Sarah Wilkes	Toronto, Ontario	$175,000
2026 (Jan.)	(Switzerland) Alina Pätz, Silvana Tirinzoni (skip), Carole Howald, Selina Witschonke	(Manitoba) Kerri Einarson, Val Sweeting, Shannon Birchard, Karlee Burgess	Steinbach, Manitoba	$175,000
