= Scott Bailey (curler) =

Canadian curler

- Curler
- Born: March 12, 1970 (age 56); Brampton, Ontario, Canada

Team
- Curling club: Dundas Granite CC, Dundas, ON

Curling career
- Member Association: Ontario
- Brier: 3 (1998, 2001, 2005)
- Top CTRS ranking: 2nd (2003–04)
- Grand Slam victories: 6: Masters (Dec 2003); Canadian Open (2001); The National (2005, 2008); Players (2002, 2012)
Medal record
Men's Curling
World Curling Championships
Gold medal – first place	1998 Kamloops
Montana's Brier
Gold medal – first place	1998 Winnipeg
Bronze medal – third place	2001 Ottawa

Scott Bailey (born March 12, 1970) is a Canadian curler. He is best known however for being the long-time lead for Wayne Middaugh. It was with Middaugh that Bailey won the 1998 Ford World Curling Championships.

Bailey was a member of the Middaugh rink from 1994 to 2010, when Middaugh left the Russ Howard rink. During this period, the Middaugh rink won three provincial championships (1998, 2001 and 2005), in addition to winning the 1998 Labatt Brier and 1998 World Championships.

Bailey played for the John Epping rink from 2010 to 2014. He currently skips his own rink, reaching the Ontario Tankard provincials in 2016 and 2017.

== Personal life ==
Outside of curling, Bailey owns Bailey Contracting. He is married and has three children and resides in Brampton.
