= Rudy Ramcharan =

Canadian curler

Rudy Ramcharan (born 1964) is a Canadian curler from Edmonton, Alberta. He played second for three seasons for Kevin Martin from 1996–97 to 1998–99. He won a Brier as a member of the team in 1997.

Ramcharan joined the team in 1996, and became the first visible minority to win the Brier, being of West Indies descent. The team won the 1997 Labatt Brier and then finished fourth at 1997 Ford World Curling Championships. Ramcharan is one of only two visible minorities to have won the Brier, the other being Bryan Miki, who won the Brier in 2000 with Greg McAulay.

Ramcharan was replaced by Carter Rycroft on the team in 1999, and has since all but disappeared from the curling world. Much of this has to do with a bonspiel he organized in 1999, known as the "World Open Classic". It was originally going to have a purse of $250,000, but due to lack of sponsorships, it was reduced to just $25,000, and many top teams pulled out, embarrassing Ramcharan.

== Teams ==
Season	Skip	Third	Second	Lead	Alternate	Coach	Events
1994–95	Ken Hunka	Rudy Ramcharan	Glen Hunka	Doug Ganske			
1996–97	Kevin Martin	Don Walchuk	Rudy Ramcharan	Don Bartlett	Jules Owchar	Jules Owchar	Brier 1997 (gold); WCC 1997 (4th)
1997–98	Kevin Martin	Don Walchuk	Rudy Ramcharan	Don Bartlett		Jules Owchar	COCT 1997 (silver)
1998–99	Kevin Martin	Don Walchuk	Rudy Ramcharan	Don Bartlett			
1999–00	Rudy Ramcharan	Jerry Semen	Ken McLean	Randy Rogers			
2006–07	Tony Germsheid	Rudy Ramcharan	Matt Wood	John Boucher			

== Personal life ==
Ramcharan moved to Alberta at the age of 5 and grew up in Alliance, Alberta, where he also golfed. He began curling at the age of 12 or 13. At the time of the 1997 Brier, he was employed as a computer consultant.
