= 1985 Canadian Junior Men's Curling Championship =

The 1985 Pepsi Canadian Junior Men's Curling Championship was held February 17–24 in St. John's, Newfoundland. Team Alberta, skipped by 2010 Olympic champion skip Kevin Martin won the event, defeating Prince Edward Island (skipped by Kent Scales) in the finals. It was the first major championship win for Martin, one of the most decorated curlers in history. His win earned Martin a spot as the alternate for Canada at the 1985 World Junior Curling Championships, and his team (which also included Mike Berger, Dan Petryk and Rick Feeny) a spot representing Canada at the 1986 World Junior Curling Championships, where they would win a silver medal.

Martin was a petroleum technologies student at the Northern Alberta Institute of Technology at the time.

== Round-robin standings ==
Key
Teams to Playoffs
Teams to Tiebreakers

Team	Skip	Locale	W	L
Prince Edward Island	Kent Scales	Charlottetown	10	1
Alberta	Kevin Martin	Edmonton	7	4
Newfoundland	Alex Smith	St. John's	6	5
Ontario	Fred Hackel	London	6	5
Quebec	Steve Gagnon	Jonquière	6	5
Saskatchewan	Steven Leippi	Kronau	6	5
Manitoba	Larry Knowles	Winnipeg	5	6
British Columbia	Dean Mackney	Kelowna	4	7
New Brunswick	Gilles Verret	Moncton	4	7
Northern Ontario	Curtis Cassidy	Nipigon	4	7
Northwest Territories / Yukon	Richard Robertson	Yellowknife	4	7
Nova Scotia	Danny Bentley	Truro	4	7

== Playoffs ==
Semifinal			Final
			1	Prince Edward Island	3
2	Alberta	5	2	Alberta	6
3	Quebec	4

=== Semifinal ===
Team	1	2	3	4	5	6	7	8	9	10	11	Final
Alberta (Martin)	2	0	1	0	0	0	0	0	1	0	1	5
Quebec (Gagnon)	0	1	0	0	0	2	0	0	0	1	0	4

=== Final ===
Team	1	2	3	4	5	6	7	8	9	10	Final
Alberta (Martin)	1	1	1	0	0	2	0	0	1	X	6
Prince Edward Island (Scales)	0	0	0	1	0	0	1	1	0	X	3
