= 1997 Labatt Brier =

- Host city: Calgary, Alberta
- Arena: Canadian Airlines Saddledome
- Dates: March 8–15
- Attendance: 223,322
- Winner: Alberta
- Curling club: Ottewell CC, Edmonton
- Skip: Kevin Martin
- Third: Don Walchuk
- Second: Rudy Ramcharan
- Lead: Don Bartlett
- Alternate: Jules Owchar
- Finalist: Manitoba (Vic Peters)

The 1997 Labatt Brier was held from March 8 to 15 at the Canadian Airlines Saddledome in Calgary, Alberta. Kevin Martin of Alberta defeated Vic Peters of Manitoba in the final in front of a sell-out crowd of 17,024. It was the largest one-day attendance at any curling event in history up to that point and the Brier's total attendance of 223,322 was a record. In the tenth end of the final, Alberta led 9–8, without hammer. Team Martin played for the steal, throwing up numerous guards. On his last stone, Peters missed a six-foot angle raise double takeout, giving Alberta the steal, and losing the game. It was the first Brier Alberta won on home ice since 1961. The win qualified the Martin rink to represent Canada at the 1997 World Men's Curling Championship as well as a spot in the 1997 Canadian Olympic Curling Trials.

== Teams ==
Alberta	British Columbia	Manitoba
Ottewell CC, Edmonton Skip: Kevin Martin; Third: Don Walchuk; Second: Rudy Ramcharan; Lead: Don Bartlett; Fifth: Jules Owchar	Kamloops CC, Kamloops Skip: Barry McPhee; Third: Dave Schleppe; Second: Ken Brown; Lead: Bert Hinch; Fifth: John Pisarczyk	Granite CC, Winnipeg Skip: Vic Peters; Third: Dan Carey; Second: Chris Neufeld; Lead: Scott Grant; Fifth: Don Rudd
New Brunswick	Newfoundland and Labrador	Northern Ontario
Thistle-St. Andrews CC, Saint John Skip: James Grattan; Third: Charles Sullivan; Second: Daryell Nowlan; Lead: Jeff Lacey; Fifth: David Nowlan	St. John's CC, St. John's Skip: Jeff Thomas; Third: Lorne Henderson; Second: Ken Ellis; Lead: Ian Kerr; Fifth: Peter Hollett	Soo CA, Sault Ste. Marie Fourth: Chris Buchan; Skip: Mike Coulter; Second: Dusty Jakomait; Lead: Mark Maki; Fifth: Rollie Ralph
Nova Scotia	Ontario	Prince Edward Island
Dartmouth CC, Dartmouth Skip: Lowell Goulden; Third: Bill Robinson; Second: Georg Ernst; Lead: Kris MacLeod; Fifth: Ron Robinson	Churchill CC, Churchill Skip: Ed Werenich; Third: John Kawaja; Second: Pat Perroud; Lead: Neil Harrison; Fifth: Peter Steski	Charlottetown CC, Charlottetown Skip: Robert Campbell; Third: Peter Gallant; Second: Mark O'Rourke; Lead: Mark Butler; Fifth: David Campbell
Quebec	Saskatchewan	Yukon/Northwest Territories
Buckingham CC, Buckingham Skip: Don Westphal; Third: Dan Lemery; Second: Pierre Charette; Lead: Louis Biron; Fifth: Daniel Lafleur	Estevan CC, Estevan Skip: Jim Packet; Third: Jeff Mosley; Second: Dallas Duce; Lead: Ken Loeffler; Fifth: Bob Doerr	Whitehorse CC, Whitehorse Skip: Lonnie Kofoed; Third: Nolin McGowan; Second: Humphrey Power; Lead: Darol Stuart; Fifth: Wade Scoffin

== Map of teams ==
Provincial Winners

== Round-robin standings ==
Key
Teams to Playoffs

Province	Skip	W	L
Manitoba	Vic Peters	11	0
Alberta	Kevin Martin	10	1
New Brunswick	James Grattan	8	3
Ontario	Ed Werenich	7	4
Quebec	Don Westphal	5	6
Newfoundland	Jeff Thomas	5	6
British Columbia	Barry McPhee	5	6
Nova Scotia	Lowell Goulden	4	7
Yukon/Northwest Territories	Lonnie Kofoed	4	7
Northern Ontario	Mike Coulter	3	8
Prince Edward Island	Robert Campbell	3	8
Saskatchewan	Jim Packet	1	10

== Round-robin results ==
=== Draw 1 ===
Sheet A	1	2	3	4	5	6	7	8	9	10	Final
British Columbia (McPhee) 🔨	1	0	1	1	0	0	1	0	0	0	4
Manitoba (Peters)	0	0	0	0	1	1	0	1	2	3	8

Sheet B	1	2	3	4	5	6	7	8	9	10	Final
Quebec (Westphal)	0	0	0	1	0	1	0	0	2	0	4
Alberta (Martin) 🔨	1	0	0	0	1	0	1	1	0	1	5

Sheet C	1	2	3	4	5	6	7	8	9	10	Final
Prince Edward Island (Campbell)	1	0	0	0	1	0	0	0	2	0	4
Newfoundland (Thomas) 🔨	0	0	0	2	0	0	0	3	0	1	6

Sheet D	1	2	3	4	5	6	7	8	9	10	Final
Nova Scotia (Goulden)	0	0	0	1	0	0	0	0	X	X	1
New Brunswick (Grattan) 🔨	0	1	1	0	3	0	2	0	X	X	7

=== Draw 2 ===
Sheet A	1	2	3	4	5	6	7	8	9	10	Final
Newfoundland (Thomas) 🔨	1	0	0	1	0	2	0	1	X	X	5
Quebec (Westphal)	0	1	0	0	5	0	3	0	X	X	9

Sheet B	1	2	3	4	5	6	7	8	9	10	Final
Ontario (Werenich) 🔨	0	2	0	3	0	1	3	0	X	X	9
Yukon/Northwest Territories (Kofoed)	0	0	2	0	0	0	0	1	X	X	3

Sheet C	1	2	3	4	5	6	7	8	9	10	Final
Saskatchewan (Packet)	0	1	0	0	1	0	0	2	1	1	6
Northern Ontario (Coulter) 🔨	1	0	1	2	0	1	0	0	0	0	5

Sheet D	1	2	3	4	5	6	7	8	9	10	Final
Alberta (Martin) 🔨	3	0	2	0	1	0	1	0	2	X	9
British Columbia (McPhee)	0	2	0	1	0	2	0	2	0	X	7

=== Draw 3 ===
Sheet B	1	2	3	4	5	6	7	8	9	10	Final
British Columbia (McPhee) 🔨	1	0	2	0	1	0	2	0	4	X	10
Saskatchewan (Packet)	0	1	0	1	0	1	0	1	0	X	4

Sheet C	1	2	3	4	5	6	7	8	9	10	Final
Yukon/Northwest Territories (Kofoed) 🔨	0	0	2	0	0	1	0	0	1	X	4
Nova Scotia (Goulden)	0	0	0	1	3	0	2	0	0	X	6

=== Draw 4 ===
Sheet A	1	2	3	4	5	6	7	8	9	10	11	Final
New Brunswick (Grattan) 🔨	0	1	0	0	3	0	0	1	1	0	1	7
Prince Edward Island (Campbell)	0	0	1	0	0	2	0	0	0	3	0	6

Sheet B	1	2	3	4	5	6	7	8	9	10	Final
Northern Ontario (Coulter) 🔨	0	1	0	1	0	2	0	2	0	X	6
Ontario (Werenich)	1	0	4	0	2	0	2	0	1	X	10

Sheet C	1	2	3	4	5	6	7	8	9	10	Final
Quebec (Westphal) 🔨	0	2	0	0	0	0	0	X	X	X	2
Manitoba (Peters)	1	0	1	0	2	2	1	X	X	X	7

Sheet D	1	2	3	4	5	6	7	8	9	10	Final
Saskatchewan (Packet) 🔨	0	0	0	1	0	1	0	2	0	X	4
Yukon/Northwest Territories (Kofoed)	0	0	0	0	1	0	3	0	4	X	8

=== Draw 5 ===
Sheet A	1	2	3	4	5	6	7	8	9	10	Final
Manitoba (Peters) 🔨	2	0	3	0	0	2	1	0	2	X	10
Northern Ontario (Coulter)	0	2	0	1	0	0	0	2	0	X	5

Sheet B	1	2	3	4	5	6	7	8	9	10	11	Final
Nova Scotia (Goulden) 🔨	1	0	0	1	1	0	0	1	0	1	0	5
Newfoundland (Thomas)	0	1	0	0	0	2	1	0	1	0	1	6

Sheet C	1	2	3	4	5	6	7	8	9	10	Final
Ontario (Werenich) 🔨	1	0	2	0	0	0	1	0	0	2	6
New Brunswick (Grattan)	0	1	0	0	1	0	0	0	2	0	4

Sheet D	1	2	3	4	5	6	7	8	9	10	Final
Prince Edward Island (Campbell) 🔨	0	2	0	2	0	0	0	1	0	X	5
Alberta (Martin)	1	0	2	0	1	0	1	0	5	X	10

=== Draw 6 ===
Sheet A	1	2	3	4	5	6	7	8	9	10	Final
Ontario (Werenich) 🔨	0	0	0	0	1	0	2	0	1	0	4
Newfoundland (Thomas)	0	1	0	0	0	2	0	2	0	1	6

Sheet B	1	2	3	4	5	6	7	8	9	10	Final
Prince Edward Island (Campbell) 🔨	0	1	0	2	0	0	0	0	2	0	5
Manitoba (Peters)	0	0	3	0	1	0	0	2	0	1	7

Sheet C	1	2	3	4	5	6	7	8	9	10	Final
Alberta (Martin) 🔨	3	0	3	1	2	0	X	X	X	X	9
Northern Ontario (Coulter)	0	1	0	0	0	1	X	X	X	X	2

Sheet D	1	2	3	4	5	6	7	8	9	10	Final
New Brunswick (Grattan) 🔨	1	0	1	1	0	0	2	0	0	1	6
Quebec (Westphal)	0	2	0	0	1	0	0	0	2	0	5

=== Draw 7 ===
Sheet A	1	2	3	4	5	6	7	8	9	10	Final
Quebec (Westphal) 🔨	1	0	0	2	2	1	0	2	X	X	8
Saskatchewan (Packet)	0	0	2	0	0	0	1	0	X	X	3

Sheet B	1	2	3	4	5	6	7	8	9	10	Final
Manitoba (Peters) 🔨	1	0	2	0	1	0	0	0	1	X	5
Yukon/Northwest Territories (Kofoed)	0	0	0	2	0	0	0	1	0	X	3

Sheet C	1	2	3	4	5	6	7	8	9	10	Final
Nova Scotia (Goulden) 🔨	0	1	0	1	0	0	1	0	X	X	3
Alberta (Martin)	1	0	3	0	3	1	0	2	X	X	10

Sheet D	1	2	3	4	5	6	7	8	9	10	Final
Newfoundland (Thomas) 🔨	2	0	2	0	2	0	4	0	X	X	10
British Columbia (McPhee)	0	1	0	1	0	1	0	1	X	X	4

=== Draw 8 ===
Sheet A	1	2	3	4	5	6	7	8	9	10	Final
Northern Ontario (Coulter) 🔨	1	0	0	2	0	0	1	0	2	0	6
Nova Scotia (Goulden)	0	0	3	0	2	0	0	2	0	1	8

Sheet B	1	2	3	4	5	6	7	8	9	10	Final
Saskatchewan (Packet) 🔨	0	0	0	1	0	0	1	0	0	X	2
New Brunswick (Grattan)	0	0	0	0	0	2	0	3	0	X	5

Sheet C	1	2	3	4	5	6	7	8	9	10	Final
Yukon/Northwest Territories (Kofoed) 🔨	1	0	2	0	0	1	0	0	X	X	4
Prince Edward Island (Campbell)	0	1	0	2	2	0	2	4	X	X	11

Sheet D	1	2	3	4	5	6	7	8	9	10	Final
British Columbia (McPhee) 🔨	0	1	0	0	2	0	3	0	0	1	7
Ontario (Werenich)	0	0	1	1	0	2	0	1	1	0	6

=== Draw 9 ===
Sheet A	1	2	3	4	5	6	7	8	9	10	Final
Alberta (Martin) 🔨	0	3	1	0	2	0	1	X	X	X	7
Yukon/Northwest Territories (Kofoed)	0	0	0	0	0	1	0	X	X	X	1

Sheet B	1	2	3	4	5	6	7	8	9	10	Final
Nova Scotia (Goulden) 🔨	1	0	0	1	0	0	1	0	2	X	5
Manitoba (Peters)	0	1	0	0	2	2	0	2	0	X	7

Sheet C	1	2	3	4	5	6	7	8	9	10	Final
Saskatchewan (Packet) 🔨	0	0	1	0	0	1	0	2	0	X	4
Newfoundland (Thomas)	0	1	0	3	1	0	1	0	1	X	7

Sheet D	1	2	3	4	5	6	7	8	9	10	11	Final
Northern Ontario (Coulter) 🔨	0	3	0	0	0	0	2	0	1	0	1	7
Prince Edward Island (Campbell)	0	0	0	2	0	1	0	1	0	2	0	6

=== Draw 10 ===
Sheet A	1	2	3	4	5	6	7	8	9	10	Final
Prince Edward Island (Campbell) 🔨	4	0	0	2	1	0	1	0	2	X	10
Saskatchewan (Packet)	0	3	1	0	0	2	0	2	0	X	8

Sheet B	1	2	3	4	5	6	7	8	9	10	Final
Newfoundland (Thomas) 🔨	0	1	0	0	2	0	0	1	0	0	4
Northern Ontario (Coulter)	0	0	0	2	0	2	1	0	1	1	7

Sheet C	1	2	3	4	5	6	7	8	9	10	Final
New Brunswick (Grattan) 🔨	0	3	0	2	0	0	1	0	0	2	8
British Columbia (McPhee)	1	0	1	0	1	1	0	1	0	0	5

Sheet D	1	2	3	4	5	6	7	8	9	10	Final
Quebec (Westphal) 🔨	0	0	1	0	0	0	1	X	X	X	2
Ontario (Werenich)	1	2	0	2	1	1	0	X	X	X	7

=== Draw 11 ===
Sheet A	1	2	3	4	5	6	7	8	9	10	Final
Ontario (Werenich) 🔨	0	1	0	0	1	0	0	0	1	0	3
Alberta (Martin)	0	0	1	1	0	0	0	3	0	1	6

Sheet B	1	2	3	4	5	6	7	8	9	10	Final
Yukon/Northwest Territories (Kofoed) 🔨	1	1	0	0	1	0	2	0	1	1	7
Quebec (Westphal)	0	0	2	0	0	1	0	2	0	0	5

Sheet C	1	2	3	4	5	6	7	8	9	10	Final
Manitoba (Peters) 🔨	1	0	0	2	2	0	1	1	0	0	7
New Brunswick (Grattan)	0	3	0	0	0	1	0	0	2	0	6

Sheet D	1	2	3	4	5	6	7	8	9	10	11	Final
British Columbia (McPhee) 🔨	1	0	3	1	0	0	0	0	1	0	1	7
Nova Scotia (Goulden)	0	1	0	0	1	0	2	1	0	1	0	6

=== Draw 12 ===
Sheet A	1	2	3	4	5	6	7	8	9	10	Final
Yukon/Northwest Territories (Kofoed) 🔨	1	0	1	0	0	2	0	0	0	X	4
British Columbia (McPhee)	0	2	0	0	2	0	3	1	0	X	8

Sheet B	1	2	3	4	5	6	7	8	9	10	Final
Alberta (Martin) 🔨	2	0	1	0	2	0	0	0	0	1	6
New Brunswick (Grattan)	0	2	0	1	0	0	1	0	0	0	4

Sheet C	1	2	3	4	5	6	7	8	9	10	Final
Northern Ontario (Coulter) 🔨	1	0	2	0	1	0	2	0	X	X	6
Quebec (Westphal)	0	4	0	1	0	4	0	2	X	X	11

Sheet D	1	2	3	4	5	6	7	8	9	10	Final
Ontario (Werenich) 🔨	0	2	0	2	0	1	0	0	0	X	5
Manitoba (Peters)	0	0	2	0	2	0	2	2	1	X	9

=== Draw 13 ===
Sheet A	1	2	3	4	5	6	7	8	9	10	Final
Nova Scotia (Goulden) 🔨	0	1	0	0	0	2	0	0	3	X	6
Saskatchewan (Packet)	0	0	2	0	0	0	0	1	0	X	3

Sheet B	1	2	3	4	5	6	7	8	9	10	Final
Prince Edward Island (Campbell) 🔨	0	0	0	0	0	3	0	X	X	X	3
Ontario (Werenich)	0	1	2	2	1	0	4	X	X	X	10

Sheet C	1	2	3	4	5	6	7	8	9	10	Final
Newfoundland (Thomas) 🔨	1	1	0	0	0	1	0	0	0	X	3
Yukon/Northwest Territories (Kofoed)	0	0	2	0	2	0	0	1	1	X	6

Sheet D	1	2	3	4	5	6	7	8	9	10	11	Final
New Brunswick (Grattan) 🔨	0	1	0	0	1	0	1	0	3	0	1	7
Northern Ontario (Coulter)	0	0	2	0	0	1	0	2	0	1	0	6

=== Draw 14 ===
Sheet A	1	2	3	4	5	6	7	8	9	10	Final
Quebec (Westphal) 🔨	1	0	2	1	0	4	0	0	1	X	9
Nova Scotia (Goulden)	0	2	0	0	1	0	1	1	0	X	5

Sheet B	1	2	3	4	5	6	7	8	9	10	Final
Saskatchewan (Packet) 🔨	0	2	1	1	0	0	0	1	0	0	5
Alberta (Martin)	0	0	0	0	2	1	1	0	0	2	6

Sheet C	1	2	3	4	5	6	7	8	9	10	Final
British Columbia (McPhee) 🔨	1	0	2	0	3	0	2	0	1	X	9
Prince Edward Island (Campbell)	0	2	0	2	0	1	0	2	0	X	7

Sheet D	1	2	3	4	5	6	7	8	9	10	Final
Manitoba (Peters) 🔨	0	2	0	2	0	0	1	4	1	X	10
Newfoundland (Thomas)	0	0	2	0	2	1	0	0	0	X	5

=== Draw 15 ===
Sheet A	1	2	3	4	5	6	7	8	9	10	Final
Newfoundland (Thomas) 🔨	0	1	0	1	0	0	0	1	0	0	3
New Brunswick (Grattan)	0	0	0	0	2	0	0	0	2	1	5

Sheet B	1	2	3	4	5	6	7	8	9	10	Final
British Columbia (McPhee) 🔨	0	2	0	0	1	0	0	2	1	0	6
Quebec (Westphal)	0	0	2	0	0	2	2	0	0	1	7

Sheet C	1	2	3	4	5	6	7	8	9	10	Final
Ontario (Werenich) 🔨	1	1	0	0	0	2	0	2	2	X	8
Saskatchewan (Packet)	0	0	0	0	1	0	1	0	0	X	2

Sheet D	1	2	3	4	5	6	7	8	9	10	Final
Prince Edward Island (Campbell) 🔨	0	1	0	0	0	2	0	1	0	X	4
Nova Scotia (Goulden)	0	0	0	2	0	0	2	0	4	X	8

=== Draw 16 ===
Sheet A	1	2	3	4	5	6	7	8	9	10	Final
Manitoba (Peters) 🔨	0	1	2	1	0	0	0	3	0	X	7
Alberta (Martin)	0	0	0	0	1	1	1	0	1	X	4

Sheet B	1	2	3	4	5	6	7	8	9	10	Final
Northern Ontario (Coulter) 🔨	0	0	2	1	0	3	1	1	X	X	8
British Columbia (McPhee)	0	0	0	0	2	0	0	0	X	X	2

Sheet C	1	2	3	4	5	6	7	8	9	10	Final
Nova Scotia (Goulden) 🔨	2	2	0	1	0	0	0	3	0	X	8
Ontario (Werenich)	0	0	3	0	3	4	0	0	2	X	12

Sheet D	1	2	3	4	5	6	7	8	9	10	Final
New Brunswick (Grattan) 🔨	0	1	0	0	0	0	2	0	0	1	4
Yukon/Northwest Territories (Kofoed)	0	0	1	0	0	0	0	1	0	0	2

=== Draw 17 ===
Sheet A	1	2	3	4	5	6	7	8	9	10	Final
Yukon/Northwest Territories (Kofoed) 🔨	1	0	0	2	1	1	1	0	1	X	7
Northern Ontario (Coulter)	0	0	1	0	0	0	0	1	0	X	2

Sheet B	1	2	3	4	5	6	7	8	9	10	Final
Quebec (Westphal) 🔨	0	1	3	0	0	0	0	1	0	0	5
Prince Edward Island (Campbell)	0	0	0	1	1	1	2	0	2	1	8

Sheet C	1	2	3	4	5	6	7	8	9	10	Final
Alberta (Martin) 🔨	2	0	0	2	0	1	0	1	0	1	7
Newfoundland (Thomas)	0	2	1	0	1	0	1	0	1	0	6

Sheet D	1	2	3	4	5	6	7	8	9	10	11	Final
Saskatchewan (Packet) 🔨	1	0	1	0	0	0	0	0	0	1	0	3
Manitoba (Peters)	0	1	0	1	0	0	1	0	0	0	1	4

== Playoffs ==
Page playoffs
1	Manitoba	5
2	Alberta	6
3	New Brunswick	6
4	Ontario	4

Semifinal
1	Manitoba	6
3	New Brunswick	5

Final
2	Alberta	10
1	Manitoba	8

=== 3 vs. 4 ===
Sheet B	1	2	3	4	5	6	7	8	9	10	Final
New Brunswick (Grattan) 🔨	0	0	1	0	1	0	2	0	1	1	6
Ontario (Werenich)	0	1	0	2	0	1	0	0	0	0	4

Player percentages
New Brunswick		Ontario	
Jeff Lacey	76%	Neil Harrison	89%
Daryell Nowlan	69%	Pat Perroud	85%
Charles Sullivan	71%	John Kawaja	85%
James Grattan	79%	Ed Werenich	74%
Total	74%	Total	83%

=== 1 vs. 2 ===
Sheet B	1	2	3	4	5	6	7	8	9	10	11	Final
Manitoba (Peters) 🔨	1	0	1	0	0	0	0	1	0	2	0	5
Alberta (Martin)	0	2	0	2	0	0	0	0	1	0	1	6

Player percentages
Manitoba		Alberta	
Scott Grant	93%	Don Bartlett	83%
Chris Neufeld	86%	Rudy Ramcharan	83%
Dan Carey	75%	Don Walchuk	88%
Vic Peters	81%	Kevin Martin	89%
Total	84%	Total	86%

=== Semifinal ===
Sheet C	1	2	3	4	5	6	7	8	9	10	11	Final
Manitoba (Peters) 🔨	1	0	0	2	1	0	0	0	1	0	1	6
New Brunswick (Grattan)	0	0	1	0	0	1	0	1	0	2	0	5

Player percentages
Manitoba		New Brunswick	
Scott Grant	99%	Jeff Lacey	77%
Chris Neufeld	95%	Daryell Nowlan	89%
Dan Carey	83%	Charles Sullivan	80%
Vic Peters	80%	James Grattan	75%
Total	89%	Total	80%

=== Final ===
Sheet C	1	2	3	4	5	6	7	8	9	10	Final
Alberta (Martin)	0	0	0	2	0	4	0	0	3	1	10
Manitoba (Peters) 🔨	0	0	3	0	1	0	2	2	0	0	8

Player percentages
Alberta		Manitoba	
Don Bartlett	81%	Scott Grant	84%
Rudy Ramcharan	84%	Chris Neufeld	88%
Don Walchuk	75%	Dan Carey	85%
Kevin Martin	74%	Vic Peters	71%
Total	78%	Total	82%

== Statistics ==
=== Top 5 player percentages ===
Round Robin only

Leads	%
(Ontario) Neil Harrison	87
(Northern Ontario) Mark Maki	85
(Prince Edward Island) Mark Butler	85
(Yukon) Darol Stuart	84
(New Brunswick) Jeff Lacey	84

Seconds	%
(Ontario) Pat Perroud	85
(Manitoba) Chris Neufeld	83
(New Brunswick) Daryell Nowlan	82
(Quebec) Pierre Charette	81
(Alberta) Rudy Ramcharan	80

Thirds	%
(Alberta) Don Walchuk	84
(New Brunswick) Charles Sullivan	83
(Ontario) John Kawaja	82
(Prince Edward Island) Peter Gallant	79
(Northern Ontario) Mike Coulter	79

Skips	%
(New Brunswick) James Grattan	85
(Manitoba) Vic Peters	81
(Ontario) Ed Werenich	80
(Alberta) Kevin Martin	78
(Quebec) Don Westphal	76

=== Team percentages ===
Round Robin only

Province	Skip	%
Ontario	Ed Werenich	83
New Brunswick	James Grattan	83
Manitoba	Vic Peters	81
Alberta	Kevin Martin	81
Prince Edward Island	Robert Campbell	78
Newfoundland	Jeff Thomas	78
Northern Ontario	Mike Coulter	78
Quebec	Don Westphal	78
Yukon/Northwest Territories	Lonnie Kofoed	77
British Columbia	Barry McPhee	77
Nova Scotia	Lowell Goulden	76
Saskatchewan	Jim Packet	75
