= Dan Petryk =

Canadian curler

- Curler ♂
- Born: October 5, 1965 (age 61); Edmonton, Alberta, Canada

Team
- Curling club: Avonair CC, Edmonton, AB, Glencoe CC, Calgary, AB

Curling career
- Member Association: Alberta
- Brier: 3: (1991, 1992, 1994)
- World Championship: 1 (1991)
- Olympic: 1 (1992) (demo)
- Other appearances: World Junior Championships: 1 (1986)
Medal record
Curling
Representing Canada
World Championships
Silver medal – second place	1991 Winnipeg
World Junior Championships
Silver medal – second place	1986 Dartmouth
Representing Alberta
Tim Hortons Brier
Gold medal – first place	1991 Hamilton
Bronze medal – third place	1992 Regina

Daniel P. Petryk (born October 5, 1965) is a Canadian curler.

He is a 1991 World Men's silver medallist and a 1991 Labatt Brier champion.

He played at the 1992 Winter Olympics when curling was a demonstration sport, Canadian men's team finished at fourth place.

== Teams ==
Season	Skip	Third	Second	Lead	Alternate	Events
1984–85	Kevin Martin	Mike Berger	Dan Petryk	Rick Feeny		CJCC 1985 (gold)
1985–86	Kevin Martin	Mike Berger	Dan Petryk	Rick Feeny		WJCC 1986 (silver)
1990–91	Kevin Martin	Kevin Park	Dan Petryk	Don Bartlett	Jules Owchar	Brier 1991 (gold); WCC 1991 (silver)
1991–92	Kevin Martin	Kevin Park	Dan Petryk	Don Bartlett	Jules Owchar	WOG 1992 (4th); Brier 1992 (bronze)
1993–94	Ed Lukowich	Fred Maxie	Dan Petryk	Steve Petryk	John Ferguson	Brier 1994 (6th)
1994–95	Ed Lukowich	John Ferguson	Dan Petryk	Steve Petryk		
1996–97	Mike Sali	Dan Petryk	Brian Rumberg	Steve Petryk		
1998–99	Dan Petryk	Steve Petryk	Don DeLair	Tim Kysak		
1999–00	Dan Petryk	Steve Petryk	Don DeLair	Tim Kysak		
2000–01	Dan Petryk	Shane Sparks	Steve Petryk	Jeff Brockoff		
2001–02	Dan Petryk	?	?	?		
2002–03	Dan Petryk	Brian Fowlie	Steve Petryk	Jeff Brockoff		
2003–04	Dan Petryk (fourth)	Jamie Koe (skip)	Scott Cripps	Mike Westlund		CC 2004 (9th)
2004–05	Dan Petryk (fourth)	Terry Meek (skip)	Josh Lambden	Eugene Doherty		
2005–06	Dan Petryk (fourth)	Terry Meek (skip)	Josh Lambden	Eugene Doherty		
2006–07	Dan Petryk (fourth)	Steve Petryk (skip)	Josh Lambden	Eugene Doherty		
2007–08	Dan Petryk	Jason Backman	Dan Mick	Jason Lesmeister		
2008–09	Dan Petryk	Scott Cripps	Mike Westlund	JD Lind		
2009–10	Dan Petryk (fourth)	Brent Bawel (skip)	Sean O'Connor	Jason Lesmeister		
2010–11	Dan Petryk (fourth)	Steve Petryk (skip)	Kevin Yablonski	Brad Chyz		
2011–12	Dan Petryk (fourth)	Steve Petryk (skip)	Colin Hodgson	Brad Chyz		
2012–13	Dan Petryk (fourth)	Steve Petryk (skip)	Roland Robinson	Thomas Usselman		
2014–15	Mike Libbus	Dan Petryk	Jamie Chisholm	Brad MacInnis		
2015–16	Mike Libbus	Dan Petryk	Brad MacInnis	Peter Keenan		
2016–17	Sean O'Connor (fourth)	Mike Jantzen (skip)	Dan Petryk	Byron Wickerson		

== Personal life ==
His older brother Steve is a curler too. The brothers played together on the Ed Lukowich team at 1994 Labatt Brier and some years after it.

Dan Petryk graduated from University of Alberta.

He started curling in 1976 when he was 11 years old.
