= 2006 Tim Hortons Brier =

- Host city: Regina, Saskatchewan
- Arena: Brandt Centre
- Dates: March 11–19
- Attendance: 125,971
- Winner: Quebec
- Curling club: CC Victoria, Sainte-Foy; CC Etchemin Saint-Romuald
- Skip: Jean-Michel Ménard
- Third: François Roberge
- Second: Éric Sylvain
- Lead: Maxime Elmaleh
- Alternate: Jean Gagnon
- Coach: Michel St-Onge
- Finalist: Ontario (Glenn Howard)

The 2006 Tim Hortons Brier, the Canadian men's national curling championship, was held from March 11 to 19 at the Brandt Centre in Regina, Saskatchewan.

In the final, Quebec's Jean-Michel Ménard rink became only the second Quebec team to win the Brier, the first since Jim Ursel won in 1977, defeating Ontario's Glenn Howard 8–7. Quebec started the game with a commanding lead, stealing one in the first, and three more in the second to take a 4–0 lead. Ahead 5–4, Ménard had a chance to score four and take a five-point lead in the sixth, but missed a tap back, taking two instead. The teams traded singles until the 10th end. With Quebec up by two, Ontario needed a steal of two to tie the game in the last end. On his final shot, Ménard took out two Ontario stones in the eight-foot to win the championship. The Ménard rink became the first francophone team to win the Brier. Quebec was considered a longshot to win the Brier against teams like Howard, Kevin Martin (Alberta), Jeff Stoughton (Manitoba) and Mark Dacey (Nova Scotia). The team had won $28,000 on tour by that point, but only played in events they could reach by car, due to a lack of sponsors.

== Teams ==
Alberta	British Columbia	Manitoba
Saville SC, Edmonton Skip: Kevin Martin; Third: Don Walchuk; Second: Carter Rycroft; Lead: Don Bartlett; Alternate: Mark Johnson	Kamloops CC, Kamloops Skip: Brian Windsor; Third: Dennis Graber; Second: Randy Nelson; Lead: Bill Johnson; Alternate: Aron Herick	Charleswood CC, Winnipeg Skip: Jeff Stoughton; Third: Jon Mead; Second: Garry Van Den Berghe; Lead: Steve Gould; Alternate: Don Harvey
New Brunswick	Newfoundland and Labrador	Northern Ontario
Gage G&CC, Oromocto Skip: James Grattan; Third: Wayne Tallon; Second: Jason Vaughan; Lead: Jeff Lacey; Alternate: Mark Dobson	St. John's CC, St. John's Skip: Ken Peddigrew; Third: Ryan LeDrew; Second: Jeff Rose; Lead: Keith Jewer; Alternate: David Noftall	Cobalt-Haileybury CC, Haileybury Skip: Rob Gordon; Third: David MacInnes; Second: Steve Burnett; Lead: Jeremy Landry; Alternate: Larry Carr
Nova Scotia	Ontario	Prince Edward Island
Mayflower CC, Halifax Skip: Mark Dacey; Third: Bruce Lohnes; Second: Rob Harris; Lead: Andrew Gibson; Alternate: Mathew Harris	Coldwater & District CC, Coldwater Skip: Glenn Howard; Third: Richard Hart; Second: Brent Laing; Lead: Craig Savill; Alternate: Scott Taylor	Charlottetown CC, Charlottetown Skip: Rod MacDonald; Third: Kevin Champion; Second: Phil Gorveatt; Lead: Mike Dillon; Alternate: Mark O'Rourke
Quebec	Saskatchewan	Yukon/Northwest Territories
CC Victoria, Sainte-Foy; CC Etchemin, Saint-Romuald Skip: Jean-Michel Ménard; Third: François Roberge; Second: Éric Sylvain; Lead: Maxime Elmaleh; Alternate: Jean Gagnon	Davidson CC, Davidson Skip: Pat Simmons; Third: Jeff Sharp; Second: Chris Haichert; Lead: Ben Hebert; Alternate: Brian McCusker	Yellowknife CC, Yellowknife Skip: Jamie Koe; Third: Kevin Whitehead; Second: Mark Whitehead; Lead: Brad Chorostkowski; Alternate: Richard Robertson

== Map of teams ==
Provincial Winners

== Round-robin standings ==
Final round-robin standings

Key
Teams to Playoffs

Locale	Skip	W	L	PF	PA	EW	EL	BE	SE	S%
Ontario	Glenn Howard	10	1	91	54	51	36	10	15	86%
Quebec	Jean-Michel Ménard	8	3	90	63	49	41	6	14	79%
Alberta	Kevin Martin	8	3	76	51	47	39	11	13	85%
Nova Scotia	Mark Dacey	7	4	76	59	41	41	14	7	83%
Northwest Territories/Yukon	Jamie Koe	6	5	66	69	46	44	13	9	79%
Manitoba	Jeff Stoughton	6	5	62	72	47	43	12	11	82%
British Columbia	Brian Windsor	6	5	61	71	43	47	13	9	78%
Saskatchewan	Pat Simmons	5	6	68	70	43	39	15	10	83%
New Brunswick	James Grattan	5	6	69	68	40	40	8	10	77%
Prince Edward Island	Rod MacDonald	3	8	61	79	43	51	12	8	76%
Newfoundland and Labrador	Ken Peddigrew	2	9	52	79	39	53	10	10	76%
Northern Ontario	Rob Gordon	0	11	58	95	40	55	8	5	73%

== Round-robin results ==
All draw times are listed in Eastern Standard Time (UTC−5).

=== Draw 1 ===
Saturday, March 11, 15:00

Sheet A	1	2	3	4	5	6	7	8	9	10	Final
Saskatchewan (Simmons) 🔨	0	0	1	0	1	0	0	1	X	X	3
Nova Scotia (Dacey)	0	0	0	3	0	2	2	0	X	X	7

Sheet B	1	2	3	4	5	6	7	8	9	10	Final
Prince Edward Island (MacDonald) 🔨	3	0	0	1	0	1	0	3	0	X	8
Northwest Territories/Yukon (Koe)	0	0	1	0	2	0	1	0	2	X	6

Sheet C	1	2	3	4	5	6	7	8	9	10	Final
New Brunswick (Grattan)	0	1	0	0	1	0	1	0	X	X	3
Alberta (Martin) 🔨	1	0	2	0	0	2	0	3	X	X	8

Sheet D	1	2	3	4	5	6	7	8	9	10	Final
Ontario (Howard)	0	4	1	0	1	0	3	0	3	X	12
Quebec (Ménard) 🔨	2	0	0	2	0	2	0	0	0	X	6

=== Draw 2 ===
Saturday, March 11, 20:00

Sheet A	1	2	3	4	5	6	7	8	9	10	Final
Alberta (Martin) 🔨	2	0	1	0	0	4	0	2	X	X	9
Prince Edward Island (MacDonald)	0	0	0	0	2	0	1	0	X	X	3

Sheet B	1	2	3	4	5	6	7	8	9	10	Final
Manitoba (Stoughton) 🔨	2	0	0	1	1	0	0	2	0	X	6
British Columbia (Windsor)	0	1	0	0	0	1	0	0	1	X	3

Sheet C	1	2	3	4	5	6	7	8	9	10	Final
Newfoundland and Labrador (Peddigrew)	1	1	0	2	3	0	1	0	3	X	11
Northern Ontario (Gordon) 🔨	0	0	1	0	0	3	0	2	0	X	6

Sheet D	1	2	3	4	5	6	7	8	9	10	Final
New Brunswick (Grattan) 🔨	2	0	0	3	0	0	0	1	0	0	6
Northwest Territories/Yukon (Koe)	0	1	0	0	2	2	0	0	1	2	8

=== Draw 3 ===
Sunday, March 12, 10:00

Sheet B	1	2	3	4	5	6	7	8	9	10	Final
Quebec (Ménard) 🔨	4	0	0	1	2	0	3	X	X	X	10
Saskatchewan (Simmons)	0	0	1	0	0	1	0	X	X	X	2

Sheet C	1	2	3	4	5	6	7	8	9	10	Final
Ontario (Howard) 🔨	2	1	0	2	0	1	0	3	X	X	9
Nova Scotia (Dacey)	0	0	1	0	1	0	2	0	X	X	4

=== Draw 4 ===
Sunday, March 12, 15:00

Sheet A	1	2	3	4	5	6	7	8	9	10	11	Final
British Columbia (Windsor) 🔨	2	0	1	1	0	3	0	1	0	0	1	9
Newfoundland and Labrador (Peddigrew)	0	1	0	0	1	0	3	0	2	1	0	8

Sheet B	1	2	3	4	5	6	7	8	9	10	Final
Northwest Territories/Yukon (Koe) 🔨	0	1	0	0	1	0	1	0	1	0	4
Alberta (Martin)	1	0	1	1	0	1	0	1	0	1	6

Sheet C	1	2	3	4	5	6	7	8	9	10	11	Final
Prince Edward Island (MacDonald) 🔨	0	2	0	0	1	1	0	2	0	0	0	6
New Brunswick (Grattan)	2	0	1	1	0	0	1	0	0	1	2	8

Sheet D	1	2	3	4	5	6	7	8	9	10	11	Final
Manitoba (Stoughton) 🔨	1	2	0	0	1	0	0	1	0	0	2	7
Northern Ontario (Gordon)	0	0	1	1	0	0	1	0	0	2	0	5

=== Draw 5 ===
Sunday, March 12, 20:00

Sheet A	1	2	3	4	5	6	7	8	9	10	Final
Nova Scotia (Dacey) 🔨	2	0	1	0	0	1	0	2	0	0	6
Quebec (Ménard)	0	2	0	0	2	0	1	0	2	4	11

Sheet B	1	2	3	4	5	6	7	8	9	10	Final
Newfoundland and Labrador (Peddigrew) 🔨	0	1	0	0	1	0	2	0	0	0	4
Manitoba (Stoughton)	1	0	1	1	0	1	0	0	0	2	6

Sheet C	1	2	3	4	5	6	7	8	9	10	Final
Northern Ontario (Gordon) 🔨	1	1	0	1	0	2	0	0	0	0	5
British Columbia (Windsor)	0	0	1	0	3	0	0	1	1	1	7

Sheet D	1	2	3	4	5	6	7	8	9	10	Final
Saskatchewan (Simmons) 🔨	0	4	0	0	0	1	0	0	X	X	5
Ontario (Howard)	0	0	3	2	0	0	0	5	X	X	10

=== Draw 6 ===
Monday, March 13, 10:00

Sheet A	1	2	3	4	5	6	7	8	9	10	Final
Ontario (Howard) 🔨	1	0	2	0	3	0	1	0	1	X	8
New Brunswick (Grattan)	0	2	0	0	0	2	0	1	0	X	5

Sheet B	1	2	3	4	5	6	7	8	9	10	Final
Quebec (Ménard) 🔨	0	0	2	0	0	2	0	2	2	0	8
Prince Edward Island (MacDonald)	1	3	0	1	1	0	3	0	0	1	10

Sheet C	1	2	3	4	5	6	7	8	9	10	Final
Saskatchewan (Simmons) 🔨	0	1	0	2	0	1	0	1	X	X	5
Alberta (Martin)	1	0	3	0	2	0	3	0	X	X	9

Sheet D	1	2	3	4	5	6	7	8	9	10	Final
Nova Scotia (Dacey) 🔨	0	3	0	3	0	0	0	3	X	X	9
Northwest Territories/Yukon (Koe)	0	0	1	0	0	2	1	0	X	X	4

=== Draw 7 ===
Monday, March 13, 15:00

Sheet A	1	2	3	4	5	6	7	8	9	10	Final
Prince Edward Island (MacDonald) 🔨	1	0	0	1	1	0	0	2	0	2	7
Northern Ontario (Gordon)	0	1	1	0	0	1	0	0	1	0	4

Sheet B	1	2	3	4	5	6	7	8	9	10	Final
New Brunswick (Grattan) 🔨	2	2	1	2	0	1	0	2	X	X	10
British Columbia (Windsor)	0	0	0	0	2	0	2	0	X	X	4

Sheet C	1	2	3	4	5	6	7	8	9	10	Final
Northwest Territories/Yukon (Koe) 🔨	2	1	1	1	0	0	2	0	2	X	9
Newfoundland and Labrador (Peddigrew)	0	0	0	0	3	1	0	1	0	X	5

Sheet D	1	2	3	4	5	6	7	8	9	10	11	Final
Alberta (Martin) 🔨	0	2	0	0	2	0	0	0	1	1	0	6
Manitoba (Stoughton)	1	0	1	1	0	1	1	1	0	0	1	7

=== Draw 8 ===
Monday, March 13, 20:00

Sheet A	1	2	3	4	5	6	7	8	9	10	Final
Manitoba (Stoughton) 🔨	0	0	0	1	0	1	1	0	X	X	3
Saskatchewan (Simmons)	2	3	1	0	1	0	0	1	X	X	8

Sheet B	1	2	3	4	5	6	7	8	9	10	Final
Newfoundland and Labrador (Peddigrew) 🔨	1	0	1	0	0	0	1	0	1	0	4
Nova Scotia (Dacey)	0	2	0	2	0	0	0	1	0	1	6

Sheet C	1	2	3	4	5	6	7	8	9	10	Final
British Columbia (Windsor) 🔨	2	0	0	0	1	0	0	2	0	X	5
Ontario (Howard)	0	2	3	1	0	1	1	0	1	X	9

Sheet D	1	2	3	4	5	6	7	8	9	10	Final
Northern Ontario (Gordon) 🔨	2	0	0	1	0	1	0	1	0	X	5
Quebec (Ménard)	0	3	2	0	2	0	1	0	2	X	10

=== Draw 9 ===
Tuesday, March 14, 10:00

Sheet A	1	2	3	4	5	6	7	8	9	10	Final
British Columbia (Windsor) 🔨	1	0	1	0	0	0	1	0	2	1	6
Nova Scotia (Dacey)	0	1	0	0	2	0	0	1	0	0	4

Sheet B	1	2	3	4	5	6	7	8	9	10	Final
Northern Ontario (Gordon) 🔨	2	0	1	0	2	0	1	0	1	0	7
Saskatchewan (Simmons)	0	1	0	2	0	3	0	1	0	1	8

Sheet C	1	2	3	4	5	6	7	8	9	10	Final
Manitoba (Stoughton) 🔨	2	0	1	0	1	0	2	0	2	X	8
Quebec (Ménard)	0	2	0	3	0	1	0	4	0	X	10

Sheet D	1	2	3	4	5	6	7	8	9	10	Final
Newfoundland and Labrador (Peddigrew) 🔨	0	1	0	0	1	0	1	0	1	X	4
Ontario (Howard)	1	0	2	1	0	2	0	1	0	X	7

=== Draw 10 ===
Tuesday, March 14, 15:00

Sheet A	1	2	3	4	5	6	7	8	9	10	Final
Quebec (Ménard) 🔨	1	0	0	1	1	0	1	0	1	X	5
Northwest Territories/Yukon (Koe)	0	1	0	0	0	1	0	1	0	X	3

Sheet B	1	2	3	4	5	6	7	8	9	10	Final
Ontario (Howard) 🔨	1	0	1	0	0	1	0	0	1	0	4
Alberta (Martin)	0	3	0	2	0	0	0	1	0	1	7

Sheet C	1	2	3	4	5	6	7	8	9	10	11	Final
Nova Scotia (Dacey) 🔨	0	3	0	1	0	0	1	0	1	0	1	7
Prince Edward Island (MacDonald)	1	0	2	0	1	0	0	1	0	1	0	6

Sheet D	1	2	3	4	5	6	7	8	9	10	Final
Saskatchewan (Simmons) 🔨	1	0	1	0	1	0	1	0	3	1	8
New Brunswick (Grattan)	0	1	0	2	0	0	0	2	0	0	5

=== Draw 11 ===
Tuesday, March 14, 20:00

Sheet A	1	2	3	4	5	6	7	8	9	10	Final
Alberta (Martin) 🔨	0	2	0	2	1	1	0	2	X	X	8
Newfoundland and Labrador (Peddigrew)	0	0	1	0	0	0	0	0	X	X	1

Sheet B	1	2	3	4	5	6	7	8	9	10	Final
Northwest Territories/Yukon (Koe) 🔨	1	0	1	0	2	0	1	0	0	2	7
Manitoba (Stoughton)	0	1	0	2	0	2	0	0	1	0	6

Sheet C	1	2	3	4	5	6	7	8	9	10	Final
New Brunswick (Grattan) 🔨	2	0	0	2	4	1	X	X	X	X	9
Northern Ontario (Gordon)	0	2	0	0	0	0	X	X	X	X	2

Sheet D	1	2	3	4	5	6	7	8	9	10	Final
Prince Edward Island (MacDonald) 🔨	0	2	0	0	2	0	0	1	0	0	5
British Columbia (Windsor)	1	0	2	1	0	0	2	0	2	0	8

=== Draw 12 ===
Wednesday, March 15, 10:00

Sheet A	1	2	3	4	5	6	7	8	9	10	Final
New Brunswick (Grattan) 🔨	1	0	0	5	0	3	X	X	X	X	9
Manitoba (Stoughton)	0	0	2	0	1	0	X	X	X	X	3

Sheet B	1	2	3	4	5	6	7	8	9	10	Final
Prince Edward Island (MacDonald) 🔨	1	1	0	0	2	0	0	1	0	0	5
Newfoundland and Labrador (Peddigrew)	0	0	1	1	0	2	0	0	1	1	6

Sheet C	1	2	3	4	5	6	7	8	9	10	Final
Alberta (Martin) 🔨	1	1	1	0	1	0	3	X	X	X	7
British Columbia (Windsor)	0	0	0	0	0	1	0	X	X	X	1

Sheet D	1	2	3	4	5	6	7	8	9	10	Final
Northwest Territories/Yukon (Koe) 🔨	2	0	0	3	0	3	0	1	0	X	9
Northern Ontario (Gordon)	0	1	2	0	2	0	2	0	1	X	8

=== Draw 13 ===
Wednesday, March 15, 15:00

Sheet A	1	2	3	4	5	6	7	8	9	10	Final
Northern Ontario (Gordon) 🔨	0	1	0	1	2	0	0	0	0	X	4
Ontario (Howard)	0	0	2	0	0	2	1	1	1	X	7

Sheet B	1	2	3	4	5	6	7	8	9	10	Final
British Columbia (Windsor) 🔨	0	1	0	1	1	0	0	2	2	X	7
Quebec (Ménard)	0	0	2	0	0	2	1	0	0	X	5

Sheet C	1	2	3	4	5	6	7	8	9	10	Final
Newfoundland and Labrador (Peddigrew) 🔨	1	1	0	0	0	0	0	1	1	0	4
Saskatchewan (Simmons)	0	0	1	3	1	0	0	0	0	2	7

Sheet D	1	2	3	4	5	6	7	8	9	10	Final
Manitoba (Stoughton) 🔨	0	0	1	0	2	0	2	1	0	2	8
Nova Scotia (Dacey)	1	0	0	2	0	2	0	0	2	0	7

=== Draw 14 ===
Wednesday, March 15, 20:00

Sheet A	1	2	3	4	5	6	7	8	9	10	Final
Saskatchewan (Simmons) 🔨	0	0	3	2	0	2	3	X	X	X	10
Prince Edward Island (MacDonald)	0	0	0	0	1	0	0	X	X	X	1

Sheet B	1	2	3	4	5	6	7	8	9	10	Final
Nova Scotia (Dacey) 🔨	2	2	0	2	0	3	X	X	X	X	9
New Brunswick (Grattan)	0	0	1	0	1	0	X	X	X	X	2

Sheet C	1	2	3	4	5	6	7	8	9	10	Final
Ontario (Howard) 🔨	1	0	2	0	3	0	0	2	0	2	10
Northwest Territories/Yukon (Koe)	0	2	0	1	0	1	2	0	1	0	7

Sheet D	1	2	3	4	5	6	7	8	9	10	Final
Quebec (Ménard) 🔨	1	0	2	0	1	0	0	2	2	1	9
Alberta (Martin)	0	1	0	1	0	2	1	0	0	0	5

=== Draw 15 ===
Thursday, March 16, 9:30

Sheet A	1	2	3	4	5	6	7	8	9	10	Final
Northwest Territories/Yukon (Koe) 🔨	1	0	0	0	1	0	1	1	0	X	4
British Columbia (Windsor)	0	0	1	0	0	0	0	0	1	X	2

Sheet B	1	2	3	4	5	6	7	8	9	10	11	Final
Alberta (Martin) 🔨	1	0	2	0	0	1	0	1	0	2	3	10
Northern Ontario (Gordon)	0	1	0	0	2	0	2	0	2	0	0	7

Sheet C	1	2	3	4	5	6	7	8	9	10	11	Final
Prince Edward Island (MacDonald) 🔨	1	0	0	1	1	0	1	0	0	1	0	5
Manitoba (Stoughton)	0	0	1	0	0	1	0	2	1	0	1	6

Sheet D	1	2	3	4	5	6	7	8	9	10	Final
New Brunswick (Grattan) 🔨	0	2	0	2	1	1	0	3	X	X	9
Newfoundland and Labrador (Peddigrew)	1	0	1	0	0	0	1	0	X	X	3

=== Draw 16 ===
Thursday, March 16, 14:00

Sheet A	1	2	3	4	5	6	7	8	9	10	Final
Nova Scotia (Dacey) 🔨	1	2	0	0	4	0	X	X	X	X	7
Alberta (Martin)	0	0	0	0	0	1	X	X	X	X	1

Sheet B	1	2	3	4	5	6	7	8	9	10	Final
Saskatchewan (Simmons) 🔨	0	0	1	0	0	1	1	0	1	0	4
Northwest Territories/Yukon (Koe)	0	0	0	0	1	0	0	2	0	2	5

Sheet C	1	2	3	4	5	6	7	8	9	10	Final
Quebec (Ménard) 🔨	3	0	2	0	3	1	X	X	X	X	9
New Brunswick (Grattan)	0	1	0	2	0	0	X	X	X	X	3

Sheet D	1	2	3	4	5	6	7	8	9	10	Final
Ontario (Howard) 🔨	2	0	2	0	1	1	0	1	0	X	7
Prince Edward Island (MacDonald)	0	1	0	1	0	0	1	0	2	X	5

=== Draw 17 ===
Thursday, March 16, 20:00

Sheet A	1	2	3	4	5	6	7	8	9	10	Final
Newfoundland and Labrador (Peddigrew) 🔨	0	0	0	0	2	0	0	0	X	X	2
Quebec (Ménard)	2	1	1	1	0	0	1	1	X	X	7

Sheet B	1	2	3	4	5	6	7	8	9	10	Final
Manitoba (Stoughton) 🔨	1	0	0	1	0	0	0	X	X	X	2
Ontario (Howard)	0	2	0	0	5	1	0	X	X	X	8

Sheet C	1	2	3	4	5	6	7	8	9	10	Final
Northern Ontario (Gordon) 🔨	0	2	0	0	0	1	0	2	0	X	5
Nova Scotia (Dacey)	3	0	2	0	1	0	1	0	3	X	10

Sheet D	1	2	3	4	5	6	7	8	9	10	11	Final
British Columbia (Windsor) 🔨	3	0	0	1	0	2	1	0	1	0	1	9
Saskatchewan (Simmons)	0	2	0	0	3	0	0	1	0	2	0	8

== Playoffs ==
The Tim Hortons Brier uses the page playoff system where the top four teams with the best records at the end of round-robin play meet in the playoff rounds. The first and second place teams play each other, with the winner advancing directly to the final. The winner of the other page playoff game between the third and fourth place teams plays the loser of the first/second playoff game in the semi-final. The winner of the semi-final moves on to the final.

Page playoffs
1	Ontario	9
2	Quebec	6
3	Alberta	5
4	Nova Scotia	6

Semifinal
2	Quebec	7
4	Nova Scotia	6

Final
1	Ontario	7
2	Quebec	8

=== 1 vs. 2 game ===
Friday, March 17, 20:00

Sheet B	1	2	3	4	5	6	7	8	9	10	Final
Ontario (Howard) 🔨	1	0	2	0	2	0	2	0	2	X	9
Quebec (Ménard)	0	1	0	1	0	2	0	2	0	X	6

Player percentages
Ontario		Quebec	
Craig Savill	85%	Maxime Elmaleh	84%
Brent Laing	68%	Éric Sylvain	69%
Richard Hart	73%	François Roberge	88%
Glenn Howard	88%	Jean-Michel Ménard	70%
Total	78%	Total	78%

=== 3 vs. 4 game ===
Friday, March 17, 13:00

Sheet B	1	2	3	4	5	6	7	8	9	10	Final
Nova Scotia (Dacey)	0	0	2	0	0	1	0	1	0	2	6
Alberta (Martin) 🔨	0	1	0	1	0	0	1	0	2	0	5

Player percentages
Nova Scotia		Alberta	
Andrew Gibson	88%	Don Bartlett	93%
Rob Harris	85%	Carter Rycroft	73%
Bruce Lohnes	75%	Don Walchuk	79%
Mark Dacey	84%	Kevin Martin	82%
Total	83%	Total	81%

=== Semifinal ===
Saturday, March 18, 13:00

Sheet B	1	2	3	4	5	6	7	8	9	10	Final
Quebec (Ménard) 🔨	2	0	3	0	0	1	0	1	0	0	7
Nova Scotia (Dacey)	0	1	0	1	1	0	1	0	1	1	6

Player percentages
Quebec		Nova Scotia	
Maxime Elmaleh	83%	Andrew Gibson	91%
Éric Sylvain	83%	Rob Harris	81%
François Roberge	85%	Bruce Lohnes	66%
Jean-Michel Ménard	74%	Mark Dacey	74%
Total	81%	Total	78%

=== Final ===
Sunday, March 19, 19:00

Sheet B	1	2	3	4	5	6	7	8	9	10	Final
Ontario (Howard) 🔨	0	0	2	0	2	0	1	0	1	1	7
Quebec (Ménard)	1	3	0	1	0	2	0	1	0	0	8

Player percentages
Ontario		Quebec	
Craig Savill	90%	Maxime Elmaleh	90%
Brent Laing	81%	Éric Sylvain	70%
Richard Hart	80%	François Roberge	83%
Glenn Howard	80%	Jean-Michel Ménard	85%
Total	83%	Total	82%

== Statistics ==
=== Top 5 player percentages ===
Round Robin only

Leads	%
(Manitoba) Steve Gould	89
(Alberta) Don Bartlett	87
(Ontario) Craig Savill	87
(Saskatchewan) Ben Hebert	86
(Nova Scotia) Andrew Gibson	86

Seconds	%
(Saskatchewan) Chris Haichert	87
(Alberta) Carter Rycroft	86
(Ontario) Brent Laing	86
(Nova Scotia) Rob Harris	84
(Manitoba) Greg Melnichuk	79

Thirds	%
(Ontario) Richard Hart	85
(Alberta) Don Walchuk	84
(Prince Edward Island) Jeff Sharp	82
(Nova Scotia) Bruce Lohnes	82
(Quebec) François Roberge	81

Skips	%
(Ontario) Glenn Howard	88
(Alberta) Kevin Martin	81
(Manitoba) Jeff Stoughton	80
(Nova Scotia) Mark Dacey	79
(Saskatchewan) Pat Simmons	76

== Awards and honours ==
All-Star Teams

First Team

- Skip: Glenn Howard (Ontario)
- Third: Richard Hart (Ontario)
- Second: Brent Laing (Ontario)
- Lead: Steve Gould (Manitoba)

Second Team

- Skip: Kevin Martin (Alberta)
- Third: François Roberge (Quebec)
- Second: Chris Haichert (Saskatchewan)
- Lead: Craig Savill (Ontario)

Hec Gervais Most Valuable Player Award

- Jean-Michel Ménard (Quebec)

Ross Harstone Award

- Jean-Michel Ménard (Quebec)

Scotty Harper Award – Media Award

- Allen Cameron, Calgary Herald – $500 award

== Provincial playdowns ==
Bold indicates winner. Italics indicated defending provincial champion

=== Alberta ===
February 8–12 at the Saville Centre in Edmonton, Alberta

Pool A
Skip	Club	W	L
Mark Johnson	Saville Sports Centre	4	1
Randy Ferbey	Granite Curling Club	3	2
Steve Petryk	Calgary Curling Club	3	2
Ryan Keane	Saville Sports Centre	2	3
Rob Maksymetz	Sexsmith Curling Club	2	3
Jamie King	Saville Sports Centre	1	4

Pool B
Skip	Club	W	L
**Kevin Martin**	Saville Sports Centre	4	1
John Morris	Calgary Winter Club	3	2
Brent MacDonald	Lac La Biche Curling Club	2	3
Kurt Balderston	Sexsmith Curling Club	2	3
Chris Schille	Crestwood Curling Club	2	3
Dean Ross	Calgary Curling Club	2	3

Playoffs

- Morris 8–3 Petryk (2B vs 3B)
- Ferbey 8–2 MacDonald (2A vs 3A)
- Morris 6–5 Ferbey (Quarter-final)
- Johnson 5–3 Martin (A1 vs. B1)
- Martin 8–4 Morris (Semi-final)
- Martin 7–5 Johnson (Final)

=== British Columbia ===
February 15–19 at the Chilliwack Curling Club, Chilliwack, British Columbia

Skip	Club	W	L
**Brian Windsor**	Kamloops Curling Club	5	2
Bob Ursel	Kelowna Curling Club	5	2
Bert Gretzinger	Kelowna Curling Club	4	3
Mark Longworth	Vernon Curling Club	3	4
Greg McAulay	Richmond Curling Club	3	4
Jay Peachey	Golden Ears Winter Club	3	4
Brent Pierce	Royal City Curling Club	3	4
Brian Gessner	Richmond Curling Club	2	5

Playoffs

- Ursel 7–1 Gretzinger (Semi-final)
- Windsor 7–6 Ursel (Final)

The defending champion, Deane Horning did not qualify.

=== Manitoba ===
February 8–12, T.G. Smith Centre, Steinbach, Manitoba

Skip	Club	W	L
**Jeff Stoughton**	Charleswood Curling Club	7	0
Reid Carruthers	Valour Road Curling Club	7	2
Chris Galbraith	Rosser Curling Club	5	3
Randy Neufeld	La Salle Curling Club	5	3
Allan Lyburn	Wheat City Curling Club	4	3
Dave Smith	Valour Road Curling Club	4	3
Ian Beavis	Morden Curling Club	3	2
Kelly Robertson	Neepawa Curling Club	3	2
Mike McEwen	Valour Road Curling Club	3	2
Brent Scales	Swan River Curling Club	3	2
Graham Freemen	Virden Curling Club	3	2
Peter Nicholls	Elmwood Curling Club	3	2
Dave Boehmer	Valour Road Curling Club	2	2
Terry McNamee	Wheat City Curling Club	2	2
Randy Dutiaume	Valour Road Curling Club	2	2
Doug Riach	St. Vital Curling Club	2	2
Wayne Ewasko	Selkirk Curling Club	1	2
Brent Strachan	Hamiota Curling Club	1	2
Bryan Preston	Warren Curling Club	1	2
David Bohn	Valour Road Curling Club	1	2
Grant Brown	Burntwood Curling Club	1	2
Rae Kujanpaa	Rorketown Curling Club	1	2
Pete Pruden	Petersfield Curling Club	1	2
Mark Lukowich	Valour Road Curling Club	1	2
Howard Restall	Granite Curling Club	0	2
Mike Johnson	Baldur Curling Club	0	2
Rob Fleming	The Pas Curling Club	0	2
Ryan Fry	Valour Road Curling Club	0	2
Ryan Hyde	Portage Curling Club	0	2
Renaud Gagne	Valour Road Curling Club	0	2
Barry Fry	Lac du Bonnet Curling Club	0	2
Rob Van Kommer	Carberry Curling Club	0	2

=== New Brunswick ===
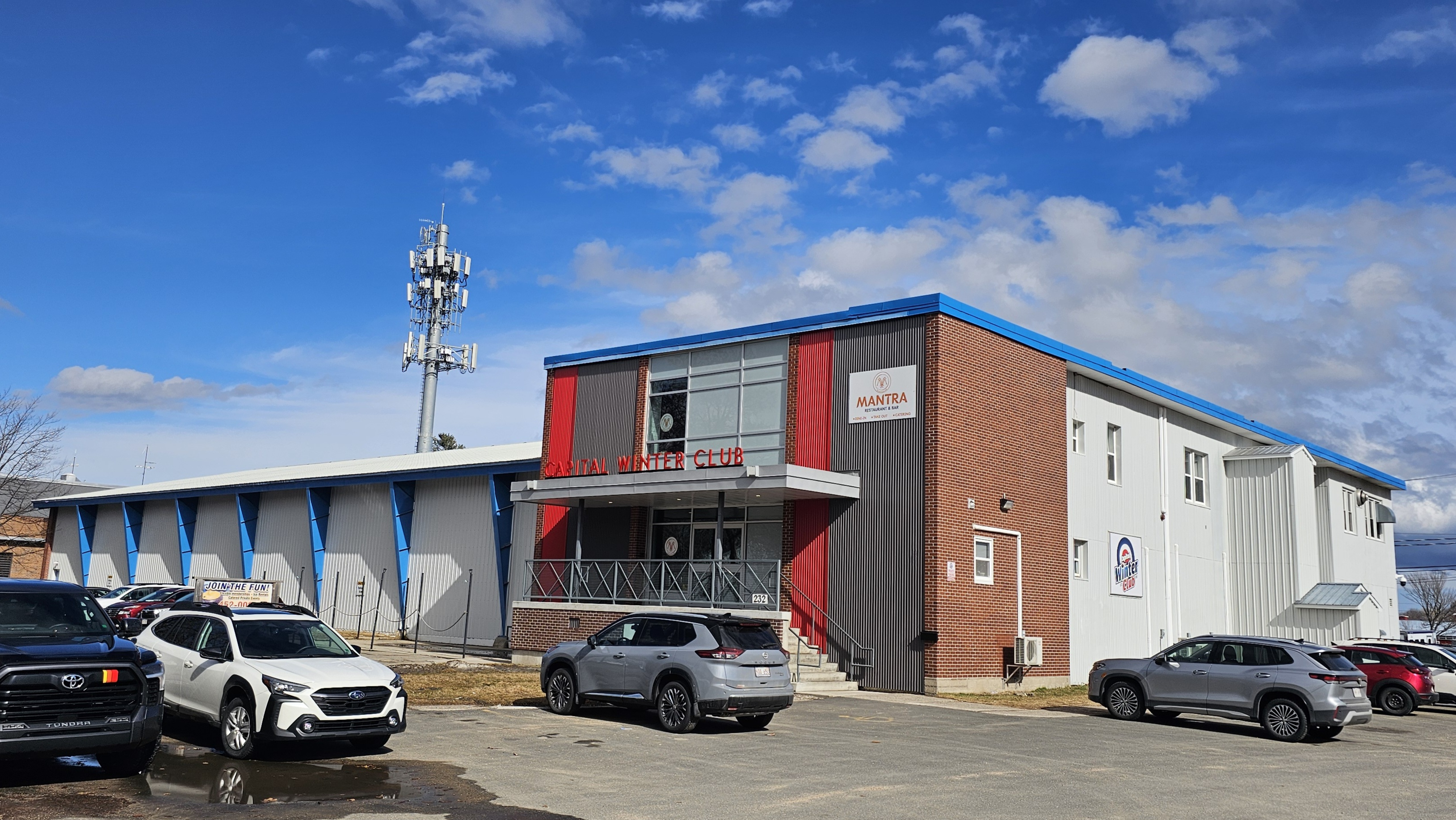
The Capital Winter Club in 2026

February 8–12 at the Capital Winter Club, Fredericton, New Brunswick

Skip	Club	W	L
**James Grattan**	Gage Golf & Curling Club	6	1
Mike Kennedy	Gladstone Curling Club	6	1
Dan Sherrard	Riverside Curling Club	6	1
Charlie Sullivan	Thistle St. Andrews Curling Club	3	4
Dave Nowlan	Capital Winter Club	3	4
Roger Oakes	Campbellton Curling Club	2	6
Paul Dobson	Thistle St. Andrews Curling Club	2	6
Dan Philip	Capital Winter Club	0	8

Playoffs

- Sherrard 5–3 Kennedy (Semi-final)
- Grattan 9–6 Sherrard (Final)

Defending champion Wade Blanchard played third for Charlie Sullivan

=== Newfoundland and Labrador ===
February 7–12, St. John's Curling Club, St. John's, Newfoundland and Labrador

Skip	Club	W	L
**Ken Peddigrew**	St. John's Curling Club	7	2
Mark Noseworthy	St. John's Curling Club	6	3
Gary Oke	Gander Curling Club	5	4
Jeff Thomas	St. John's Curling Club	5	4
Trent Skanes	St. John's Curling Club	5	4
Andrew Symonds	St. John's Curling Club	5	4
Scott Davidge	Gander Curling Club	5	4
Mike Mullins	Corner Brook Curling Association	3	6
Keith Ryan	Carol Curling Club	2	7
Bob Nugent	Bally Hally Golf & Country Club	2	7

Tie-breakers

- Skanes 12–11 Davidge
- Oke 7–5 Symonds
- Thomas 11–7 Skanes
- Oke 9–8 Thomas

Playoffs

- Noseworthy 7–4 Oke
- Peddigrew 6–5 Noseworthy

Defending champion Brad Gushue did not participate, as at the time he was representing Canada at the 2006 Winter Olympics in Turin, Italy.

=== Northern Ontario ===
February 6–12, Nipigon Curling Club, Nipigon, Ontario

Skip	Club	W	L
**Rob Gordon**	Cobalt-Hailebury Curling Club	6	2
Joe Scharf	Port Arthur Curling Club	5	3
Al Harnden	Soo Curlers Association	5	3
Al Belec	Soo Curlers Association	5	3
Bryan Burgess	Port Arthur Curling Club	5	3
John Salo	Port Arthur Curling Club	5	3
Dan Lemieux	Soo Curlers Association	4	4
Brian Fawcett	Englehart Curling Club	1	7
Kirk Van Os	Cobalt-Haileybury Curling Club	0	8

Tie-breakers

- Harnden 8–6 Salo
- Belec 8–6 Burgess
- Scharf 9–6 Harnden
- Harnden 8–2 Burgess
- Scharf 4–3 Belec

Playoffs

- Scharf 5–3 Gordon (1 vs. 2)
- Harnden 9–1 Belec (3 vs. 4)
- Gordon 6–4 Harnden (Semi-final)
- Gordon 7–6 Scharf (Final)

Defending champion Mike Jakubo did not qualify.

=== Nova Scotia ===
February 10–15, Liverpool Curling Club, Liverpool, Nova Scotia

Skip	Club	W	L
**Mark Dacey**	Mayflower Curling Club	7	1
Don MacIntosh	Truro Curling Club	6	2
Shawn Adams	Mayflower Curling Club	5	3
Chad Stevens	Chester Curling Club	4	3
Brian Rafuse	Bridgewater Curling Club	4	3
Mike Robinson	Lakeshore Curling Club	3	3
Ian Fitzner-LeBlanc	Mayflower Curling Club	3	3
Doug MacKenzie	Mayflower Curling Club	3	3
Brian Gibson	Dartmouth Curling Club	3	3
Mark Kehoe	Windsor Curling Club	2	3
Kevin White	Highlander Curling Club	2	3
Mike Flemming	Mayflower Curling Club	1	3
Peter Eddy	Mayflower Curling Club	1	3
Jeff Hopkins	Bridgewater Curling Club	1	3
Brent MacDougall	Mayflower Curling Club	0	3
Graham Breckon	Chester Curling Club	0	3

=== Ontario ===
The 2006 Ontario Kia Cup was held February 6–12, Guelph Sports Centre, Guelph, Ontario

Skip	Club	W	L
Wayne Middaugh	St. George's Golf & Country Club	7	2
**Glenn Howard**	Coldwater & District Curling Club	7	2
Mike Harris	Oakville Curling Club	7	2
Dale Matchett	Churchill Curling Club	4	5
John Epping	Omemee Curling Club	4	5
Willie Jeffries	Huntley Curling Club	4	5
Rob Todd	Brant Curling Club	3	6
Bryan Cochrane	Ottawa Curling Club	3	6
Todd Brandwood	Glendale Golf & Country Club	3	6
Pat Ferris	Grey Granite Club	3	6

Tie-breakers

- Matchett 11–9 Jeffries
- Matchett 7–5 Epping

Playoffs

- Howard 8–7 Middaugh (1 vs. 2)
- Harris 8–3 Matchett (3 vs. 4)
- Middaugh 9–5 Harris (Semi-final)
- Howard 9–6 Middaugh (Final)

=== Prince Edward Island ===
February 8–12, Charlottetown Curling Club, Charlottetown, Prince Edward Island

Skip	Club	W	L
**Rod MacDonald**	Charlottetown Curling Club	7	0
Peter Gallant	Charlottetown Curling Club	4	3
Andrew Robinson	Charlottetown Curling Club	3	3
Kyle Stevenson	Charlottetown Curling Club	2	3
Robert Shaw	Charlottetown Curling Club	2	3
Robert Campbell	Charlottetown Curling Club	2	3
Mark Kinney	Charlottetown Curling Club	0	3
Kevin Ellsworth	Silver Fox Curling and Yacht Club	0	3

=== Quebec ===
February 6–12, Arena Conrad-Parent, Sept-Îles, Quebec

Section A
Skip	Club	W	L
**Jean-Michel Ménard**	Club de curling Victoria	7	2
Martin Crête	Club de curling Jacques-Cartier	7	2
Mike Kennedy	Club de curling Baie-d'Urfé	4	5
François Gagné	Club de curling Longue-Pointe	4	5
George Tardif	Club de curling Rimouski	4	5
Steve Allen	Club de curling Shawville	4	5
Denis Laflamme	Club de curling Sept-Îles	4	5
Serge Reid	Club de curling Kénogami	4	5
René Bouffard	Club de curling Trois-Rivières	4	5
Jeff Cheal	Club de curling Lennoxville/ Club de curling North Hatley	3	6

Section B
Skip	Club	W	L
Daniel Lafleur	Club de curling Rosemère	7	2
Robert Desjardins	Club de curling Chicoutimi/ Club de curling Kénogami	7	2
Pierre Charette	Club de curling Thurso	7	2
Claude Brazeau Jr.	Club de curling Longue-Pointe	6	3
Mike Fournier	Club de curling Lachine/ Club de curling Longue-Pointe	5	4
René Lanteigne	Club de curling Kénogami	5	4
Maxime Dufresne	Club de curling Vallée de l'or	3	6
Jean-Paul Arvisais	Club de curling Sept-Îles	2	7
Simon Lejour	Club de Lacolle	2	7
Stéphane Morand	Club de curling Aurèle-Racine	1	8

Playoffs

- Charette 10–4 Crête (A2 vs B3)
- Desjardins 8–5 Kennedy (A3 vs B2)
- Ménard 6–4 Lafleur (A1 vs B1)
- Charette 8–7 Desjardins (Quarter-final)
- Charette 7–6 Lafleur (Semi-final)
- Ménard 10–5 Charette (Final)

=== Saskatchewan ===
February 8–12, Weyburn Curlin Club, Weyburn, Saskatchewan

Skip	Club	W	L
**Pat Simmons**	Davidson Curling Club	7	1
Bruce Korte	Saskatoon Granite Curling Club	7	3
Al Schick	Highland Curling Club	4	2
Gerald Shymko	Yorkton Curling Club	5	3
Brad Heidt	Kerrobert Curling Club	4	3
Doug Harcourt	Humboldt Curling Club	4	3
Randy Gilewich	Caledonian Curling Club	3	3
Darren Engel	Nutana Curling Club	3	3
Scott Bitz	Caledonian Curling Club	2	3
Steve Laycock	Saskatoon Granite Curling Club	2	3
Gerry Adam	Yorkton Curling Club	1	3
Brad Kowalski	Tartan Curling Club	1	3
Glen Despins	Strongfield Curling Club	1	3
Randy Bryden	Caledonian Curling Club	1	3
Carl deConinck-Smith	Eston Curling Club	0	3
Robert Keating	Benson Curling Club	0	3

=== Yukon/Northwest Territories ===
February 16–19, Whitehorse Curling Club, Whitehorse, Yukon

Skip	Club	W	L
**Jamie Koe**	Yellowknife Curling Club	6	0
Stephen Moss	Yellowknife Curling Club	3	3
Pat Paslawski	Whitehorse Curling Club	2	4
Chad Cowan	Whitehorse Curling Club	1	5
