= Tobias Treyer =

Swiss curler

- Curler ♂

Team
- Curling club: Basel-Ysfäger CC, Basel

Curling career
- Member Association: Switzerland
- World Championship: 1 (1997)
Medal record
Curling
Swiss Men's Championship
Gold medal – first place	1997 Bern

Tobias Treyer is a Swiss curler.

At the national level, he is a 1997 Swiss men's champion curler.

== Teams ==
Season	Skip	Third	Second	Lead	Alternate	Events
1996–97	Patrick Netzer	Markus Widmer	Damian Grichting	Fabian Burckhardt	Tobias Treyer	SMCC 1997 (gold); WCC 1997 (7th)
