= European Curling Federation =

International sports governing body

The European Curling Federation (ECF) was the governing body responsible for promoting and organizing the sport of curling throughout Europe. Founded in 1975, the federation coordinated European curling championships and represented the interests of member associations until it merged with the World Curling Federation in 2015.

== Events ==
- European Curling Championship
- European Mixed Curling Championship
- European Junior Curling Challenge
- World Curling Tour
- World Qualification Event
- Euro Super Series

== Office bearers of the European Curling Federation ==
=== Presidents ===
- 1975–1977: Jean Schild, Switzerland
- 1977–1979: Bob Grierson, Scotland
- 1979–1983: Birger Mortensen, Norway
- 1983–1988: Eric Harmsen, Netherlands
- 1988–1992: Sten Willer-Andersen, Denmark
- 1992–2000: Roy Sinclair, Scotland
- 2000–2008: Malcolm Richardson, Scotland
- 2008–2011: Andrew Ferguson Smith, Andorra
- 2011– : Olli Rissanen, Finland

=== Vice presidents ===
- 2000–2006: Dieter Kolb, Germany
- 2006– Andrew Ferguson Smith, Andorra

=== Secretaries ===
- 1975–1977: André Viscolo, Switzerland
- 1977–1980: Robin Welsh, Scotland
- 1980–1983: Stanley Flostrand, Norway
- 1983–1996: Annemie de Jongh, Netherlands
- 1996–2000: Marc Lüthi, Switzerland
- 2000– Saskia Krügl, Austria
