= 1991 Labatt Brier =

- Host city: Hamilton, Ontario
- Arena: Copps Coliseum
- Dates: March 3–10
- Attendance: 88,894
- Winner: Alberta
- Curling club: Avonair CC, Edmonton
- Skip: Kevin Martin
- Third: Kevin Park
- Second: Dan Petryk
- Lead: Don Bartlett
- Alternate: Jules Owchar
- Finalist: Saskatchewan (Randy Woytowich)

The 1991 Labatt Brier, the Canadian men's curling championship, was held from March 3 to 10 in Hamilton, Ontario. The 1991 Brier also constituted the trials that decided the Canadian men's representatives for the curling tournament at the 1992 Winter Olympics.

In the final, Kevin Martin of Alberta defeated Randy Woytowich of Saskatchewan to win his first Brier.

== Teams ==
Alberta	British Columbia	Manitoba
Avonair CC, Edmonton Skip: Kevin Martin; Third: Kevin Park; Second: Dan Petryk; Lead: Don Bartlett; Alternate: Jules Owchar	Cranbrook CC, Cranbrook Skip: Gerry Kent; Third: Brian Collison; Second: Tom Shypitka; Lead: Ken McHargue; Alternate: Lorne Qually	Wildewood CC, Winnipeg Skip: Jeff Stoughton; Third: Dave Iverson; Second: Ken Tresoor; Lead: Garry Vandenberghe; Alternate: Howard Restall
New Brunswick	Newfoundland	Northern Ontario
Beaver CC, Moncton Skip: Gary Mitchell; Third: Grant Odishaw; Second: Rick Perron; Lead: Mike Butler; Alternate: Terry Odishaw	Gander CC, Gander Skip: John Boland; Third: Phil Kieley; Second: Robert Skanes; Lead: Dave Mayne; Alternate: Gerry Parrott	Fort William CC, Thunder Bay Skip: Rick Lang; Third: Scott Henderson; Second: Ross Tetley; Lead: Art Lappalainen; Alternate: Jack Kallos Jr.
Nova Scotia	Ontario	Prince Edward Island
Halifax CC, Halifax Skip: Dan Bentley; Third: Jim Walsh; Second: Darren Bentley; Lead: George Xidos; Alternate: Trevor Bagnell	Penetanguishene CC, Penetanguishene Skip: Russ Howard; Third: Glenn Howard; Second: Wayne Middaugh; Lead: Peter Corner; Alternate: Larry Merkley	Charlottetown CC, Charlottetown Skip: Robert Campbell; Third: Peter Gallant; Second: Mark O'Rourke; Lead: Mark Butler; Alternate: Peter MacDonald
Quebec	Saskatchewan	Yukon/Northwest Territories
Glenmore CC, Montreal Skip: Kevin Adams; Third: Rob MacLean; Second: Don Reddick; Lead: Andrew Carter; Alternate: Pierre Charette	Tartan CC, Regina Skip: Randy Woytowich; Third: Brian McCusker; Second: Wyatt Buck; Lead: John Grundy; Alternate: Jim Packet	Whitehorse CC, Whitehorse Skip: Chuck Haines; Third: Malcolm Florence; Second: Craig Tuton; Lead: Doug Bryant; Alternate: Lionel Stokes

== Map of teams ==
Provincial Winners

== Round robin standings ==
Key
Teams to Playoffs
Teams to Tiebreaker

Province	Skip	W	L
Saskatchewan	Randy Woytowich	8	3
Alberta	Kevin Martin	8	3
British Columbia	Gerry Kent	7	4
Northern Ontario	Rick Lang	7	4
Manitoba	Jeff Stoughton	6	5
Prince Edward Island	Robert Campbell	6	5
Ontario	Russ Howard	6	5
Nova Scotia	Dan Bentley	5	6
Newfoundland	John Boland	4	7
New Brunswick	Gary Mitchell	4	7
Yukon/Northwest Territories	Chuck Haines	3	8
Quebec	Kevin Adams	2	9

== Round robin results ==
=== Draw 1 ===
Sheet A	1	2	3	4	5	6	7	8	9	10	11	Final
New Brunswick (Mitchell) 🔨	1	1	0	1	0	1	0	0	0	0	0	4
Nova Scotia (Bentley)	0	0	1	0	0	0	1	1	1	0	1	5

Sheet B	1	2	3	4	5	6	7	8	9	10	Final
British Columbia (Kent)	0	1	0	0	0	0	0	2	X	X	3
Ontario (Howard) 🔨	2	0	0	2	2	0	2	0	X	X	8

Sheet C	1	2	3	4	5	6	7	8	9	10	Final
Yukon/Northwest Territories (Haines) 🔨	0	0	0	0	0	0	1	0	X	X	1
Alberta (Martin)	0	1	2	1	1	1	0	3	X	X	9

Sheet D	1	2	3	4	5	6	7	8	9	10	Final
Manitoba (Stoughton) 🔨	2	0	3	0	0	0	0	1	0	2	8
Prince Edward Island (Campbell)	0	1	0	0	1	1	2	0	1	0	6

Sheet E	1	2	3	4	5	6	7	8	9	10	Final
Quebec (Adams)	0	0	0	0	2	1	0	0	0	1	4
Saskatchewan (Woytowich) 🔨	0	0	1	1	0	0	1	0	0	0	3

Sheet F	1	2	3	4	5	6	7	8	9	10	Final
Newfoundland (Boland)	0	0	0	2	0	0	0	0	1	X	3
Northern Ontario (Lang) 🔨	0	1	0	0	1	1	2	1	0	X	6

=== Draw 2 ===
Sheet A	1	2	3	4	5	6	7	8	9	10	Final
Northern Ontario (Lang) 🔨	0	1	0	0	2	1	2	1	X	X	7
Quebec (Adams)	0	0	0	2	0	0	0	0	X	X	2

Sheet B	1	2	3	4	5	6	7	8	9	10	Final
Saskatchewan (Woytowich) 🔨	2	0	0	2	0	0	3	0	0	X	7
Manitoba (Stoughton)	0	0	1	0	0	1	0	2	0	X	4

Sheet C	1	2	3	4	5	6	7	8	9	10	Final
Prince Edward Island (Campbell) 🔨	1	0	0	0	2	0	0	2	1	0	6
Yukon/Northwest Territories (Haines)	0	1	2	1	0	2	1	0	0	1	8

Sheet D	1	2	3	4	5	6	7	8	9	10	Final
Alberta (Martin) 🔨	0	0	0	0	0	1	0	0	X	X	1
British Columbia (Kent)	1	0	1	1	2	0	0	2	X	X	7

Sheet E	1	2	3	4	5	6	7	8	9	10	Final
Newfoundland (Boland) 🔨	1	0	2	1	1	1	1	1	X	X	8
New Brunswick (Mitchell)	0	1	0	0	0	0	0	0	X	X	1

Sheet F	1	2	3	4	5	6	7	8	9	10	Final
Ontario (Howard) 🔨	3	0	1	0	1	0	0	0	2	X	7
Nova Scotia (Bentley)	0	1	0	1	0	2	0	0	0	X	4

=== Draw 3 ===
Sheet A	1	2	3	4	5	6	7	8	9	10	11	12	Final
Nova Scotia (Bentley) 🔨	1	0	0	0	0	0	2	0	0	1	0	0	4
Alberta (Martin)	0	1	1	0	0	0	0	2	0	0	0	1	5

Sheet B	1	2	3	4	5	6	7	8	9	10	Final
New Brunswick (Mitchell) 🔨	0	2	0	1	0	0	0	1	0	X	4
Ontario (Howard)	0	0	2	0	2	2	0	0	2	X	8

Sheet C	1	2	3	4	5	6	7	8	9	10	Final
British Columbia (Kent) 🔨	0	4	1	1	0	3	X	X	X	X	9
Prince Edward Island (Campbell)	0	0	0	0	1	0	X	X	X	X	1

Sheet D	1	2	3	4	5	6	7	8	9	10	Final
Yukon/Northwest Territories (Haines) 🔨	0	2	0	1	0	1	0	0	0	X	4
Saskatchewan (Woytowich)	2	0	3	0	1	0	0	2	1	X	9

Sheet E	1	2	3	4	5	6	7	8	9	10	Final
Manitoba (Stoughton) 🔨	1	1	0	0	2	0	2	0	1	X	7
Northern Ontario (Lang)	0	0	0	1	0	1	0	1	0	X	3

Sheet F	1	2	3	4	5	6	7	8	9	10	Final
Quebec (Adams) 🔨	1	0	1	0	1	0	1	0	0	1	5
Newfoundland (Boland)	0	1	0	1	0	1	0	3	0	0	6

=== Draw 4 ===
Sheet A	1	2	3	4	5	6	7	8	9	10	Final
Newfoundland (Boland) 🔨	1	0	2	0	0	0	1	1	1	X	6
Manitoba (Stoughton)	0	2	0	1	0	1	0	0	0	X	4

Sheet B	1	2	3	4	5	6	7	8	9	10	Final
Northern Ontario (Lang) 🔨	3	0	2	0	0	0	0	1	2	X	8
Yukon/Northwest Territories (Haines)	0	1	0	0	1	0	1	0	0	X	3

Sheet C	1	2	3	4	5	6	7	8	9	10	Final
Saskatchewan (Woytowich) 🔨	0	1	0	0	0	1	0	2	1	X	5
British Columbia (Kent)	0	0	1	0	0	0	0	0	0	X	1

Sheet D	1	2	3	4	5	6	7	8	9	10	Final
Quebec (Adams) 🔨	1	0	0	0	2	1	0	0	1	X	5
New Brunswick (Mitchell)	0	2	0	2	0	0	2	2	0	X	8

Sheet E	1	2	3	4	5	6	7	8	9	10	11	Final
Prince Edward Island (Campbell) 🔨	0	0	2	0	1	0	0	1	1	0	1	6
Nova Scotia (Bentley)	0	1	0	1	0	1	0	0	0	2	0	5

Sheet F	1	2	3	4	5	6	7	8	9	10	11	Final
Alberta (Martin) 🔨	1	0	0	0	1	0	1	1	0	0	2	6
Ontario (Howard)	0	0	2	0	0	1	0	0	1	0	0	4

=== Draw 5 ===
Sheet A	1	2	3	4	5	6	7	8	9	10	Final
Ontario (Howard) 🔨	0	0	2	0	0	1	0	0	1	0	4
Prince Edward Island (Campbell)	0	1	0	0	1	0	1	1	0	1	5

Sheet B	1	2	3	4	5	6	7	8	9	10	11	Final
Nova Scotia (Bentley) 🔨	0	1	0	1	0	0	0	1	0	2	0	5
Saskatchewan (Woytowich)	0	0	1	0	3	0	0	0	1	0	1	6

Sheet C	1	2	3	4	5	6	7	8	9	10	Final
New Brunswick (Mitchell) 🔨	0	0	1	0	1	0	0	1	X	X	3
Alberta (Martin)	0	2	0	3	0	2	0	0	X	X	7

Sheet D	1	2	3	4	5	6	7	8	9	10	Final
British Columbia (Kent) 🔨	2	0	1	0	1	0	2	0	0	1	7
Northern Ontario (Lang)	0	1	0	1	0	0	0	0	2	0	4

Sheet E	1	2	3	4	5	6	7	8	9	10	Final
Yukon/Northwest Territories (Haines) 🔨	1	0	0	1	0	0	3	0	0	X	5
Newfoundland (Boland)	0	0	1	0	0	1	0	0	0	X	2

Sheet F	1	2	3	4	5	6	7	8	9	10	Final
Manitoba (Stoughton) 🔨	0	3	2	0	2	0	1	X	X	X	8
Quebec (Adams)	0	0	0	2	0	0	0	X	X	X	2

=== Draw 6 ===
Sheet A	1	2	3	4	5	6	7	8	9	10	Final
Quebec (Adams) 🔨	0	0	1	0	0	2	0	0	1	0	4
Yukon/Northwest Territories (Haines)	1	1	0	0	2	0	1	1	0	2	8

Sheet B	1	2	3	4	5	6	7	8	9	10	Final
Newfoundland (Boland) 🔨	1	0	1	1	1	0	0	0	2	X	6
British Columbia (Kent)	0	0	0	0	0	0	2	1	0	X	3

Sheet C	1	2	3	4	5	6	7	8	9	10	Final
Manitoba (Stoughton) 🔨	2	0	2	0	0	0	0	1	0	0	5
New Brunswick (Mitchell)	0	2	0	0	2	0	1	0	0	1	6

Sheet D	1	2	3	4	5	6	7	8	9	10	Final
Northern Ontario (Lang) 🔨	1	1	0	1	0	1	2	3	X	X	9
Nova Scotia (Bentley)	0	0	2	0	1	0	0	0	X	X	3

Sheet E	1	2	3	4	5	6	7	8	9	10	11	Final
Saskatchewan (Woytowich) 🔨	1	0	1	0	1	0	1	0	0	0	1	5
Ontario (Howard)	0	0	0	0	0	3	0	0	1	0	0	4

Sheet F	1	2	3	4	5	6	7	8	9	10	Final
Prince Edward Island (Campbell) 🔨	1	0	0	0	2	0	1	0	0	0	4
Alberta (Martin)	0	0	2	0	0	1	0	2	0	1	6

=== Draw 7 ===
Sheet A	1	2	3	4	5	6	7	8	9	10	Final
Alberta (Martin) 🔨	0	1	0	1	0	0	2	0	X	X	4
Saskatchewan (Woytowich)	1	0	1	0	1	2	0	5	X	X	10

Sheet B	1	2	3	4	5	6	7	8	9	10	Final
Ontario (Howard) 🔨	0	1	0	1	0	1	0	0	1	X	4
Northern Ontario (Lang)	0	0	3	0	3	0	1	0	0	X	7

Sheet C	1	2	3	4	5	6	7	8	9	10	Final
Nova Scotia (Bentley) 🔨	4	0	1	1	0	0	0	0	1	X	7
Newfoundland (Boland)	0	1	0	0	2	0	0	0	0	X	3

Sheet D	1	2	3	4	5	6	7	8	9	10	Final
New Brunswick (Mitchell) 🔨	1	0	2	0	3	0	1	1	0	X	8
Prince Edward Island (Campbell)	0	2	0	1	0	2	0	0	0	X	5

Sheet E	1	2	3	4	5	6	7	8	9	10	Final
British Columbia (Kent) 🔨	1	0	2	1	1	1	0	0	0	X	6
Quebec (Adams)	0	1	0	0	0	0	0	0	1	X	2

Sheet F	1	2	3	4	5	6	7	8	9	10	Final
Yukon/Northwest Territories (Haines) 🔨	1	0	1	0	1	0	0	1	0	X	4
Manitoba (Stoughton)	0	1	0	3	0	2	1	0	2	X	9

=== Draw 8 ===
Sheet A	1	2	3	4	5	6	7	8	9	10	Final
Manitoba (Stoughton) 🔨	0	0	2	0	1	0	0	0	0	2	5
British Columbia (Kent)	0	2	0	0	0	0	1	0	0	0	3

Sheet B	1	2	3	4	5	6	7	8	9	10	Final
Yukon/Northwest Territories (Haines) 🔨	2	0	1	0	0	2	0	0	1	0	6
New Brunswick (Mitchell)	0	1	0	2	0	0	2	1	0	1	7

Sheet C	1	2	3	4	5	6	7	8	9	10	11	Final
Quebec (Adams) 🔨	0	1	0	1	0	1	0	1	0	1	0	5
Nova Scotia (Bentley)	0	0	2	0	2	0	0	0	1	0	1	6

Sheet D	1	2	3	4	5	6	7	8	9	10	Final
Newfoundland (Boland) 🔨	1	0	0	0	1	0	0	2	0	X	4
Ontario (Howard)	0	0	1	0	0	3	2	0	0	X	6

Sheet E	1	2	3	4	5	6	7	8	9	10	Final
Northern Ontario (Lang) 🔨	1	2	0	2	0	0	0	1	0	X	6
Alberta (Martin)	0	0	1	0	1	5	0	0	1	X	8

Sheet F	1	2	3	4	5	6	7	8	9	10	11	Final
Saskatchewan (Woytowich) 🔨	0	0	0	2	0	0	1	0	0	1	0	4
Prince Edward Island (Campbell)	0	0	0	0	2	1	0	1	0	0	1	5

=== Draw 9 ===
Sheet A	1	2	3	4	5	6	7	8	9	10	11	Final
Prince Edward Island (Campbell) 🔨	0	2	0	0	0	2	0	0	1	0	1	6
Northern Ontario (Lang)	1	0	0	0	1	0	1	1	0	1	0	5

Sheet B	1	2	3	4	5	6	7	8	9	10	11	Final
Alberta (Martin) 🔨	0	2	0	1	0	1	0	0	1	0	1	6
Newfoundland (Boland)	1	0	1	0	1	0	0	1	0	1	0	5

Sheet C	1	2	3	4	5	6	7	8	9	10	Final
Ontario (Howard) 🔨	4	0	2	0	1	0	1	0	0	1	9
Quebec (Adams)	0	2	0	1	0	1	0	0	2	0	6

Sheet D	1	2	3	4	5	6	7	8	9	10	Final
Nova Scotia (Bentley) 🔨	0	1	1	0	0	0	0	1	0	2	5
Manitoba (Stoughton)	2	0	0	0	0	1	0	0	1	0	4

Sheet E	1	2	3	4	5	6	7	8	9	10	Final
New Brunswick (Mitchell) 🔨	0	1	0	0	1	0	X	X	X	X	2
Saskatchewan (Woytowich)	0	0	2	3	0	3	X	X	X	X	8

Sheet F	1	2	3	4	5	6	7	8	9	10	Final
British Columbia (Kent) 🔨	0	2	2	2	0	4	X	X	X	X	10
Yukon/Northwest Territories (Haines)	0	0	0	0	2	0	X	X	X	X	2

=== Draw 10 ===
Sheet A	1	2	3	4	5	6	7	8	9	10	Final
British Columbia (Kent) 🔨	1	1	0	2	0	1	1	0	2	X	8
New Brunswick (Mitchell)	0	0	1	0	1	0	0	1	0	X	3

Sheet B	1	2	3	4	5	6	7	8	9	10	Final
Yukon/Northwest Territories (Haines) 🔨	1	0	2	0	0	0	1	0	0	X	4
Nova Scotia (Bentley)	0	2	0	1	1	1	0	1	0	X	6

Sheet C	1	2	3	4	5	6	7	8	9	10	Final
Northern Ontario (Lang) 🔨	0	0	1	0	2	1	0	2	0	X	6
Saskatchewan (Woytowich)	0	0	0	1	0	0	1	0	0	X	2

Sheet D	1	2	3	4	5	6	7	8	9	10	Final
Quebec (Adams) 🔨	1	0	0	0	0	1	1	2	0	X	5
Alberta (Martin)	0	0	0	1	1	0	0	0	1	X	3

Sheet E	1	2	3	4	5	6	7	8	9	10	Final
Manitoba (Stoughton) 🔨	3	2	0	0	0	1	0	X	X	X	6
Ontario (Howard)	0	0	1	0	0	0	0	X	X	X	1

Sheet F	1	2	3	4	5	6	7	8	9	10	Final
Newfoundland (Boland) 🔨	1	0	0	2	0	2	0	0	1	0	6
Prince Edward Island (Campbell)	0	2	1	0	1	0	0	2	0	1	7

=== Draw 11 ===
Sheet A	1	2	3	4	5	6	7	8	9	10	11	Final
Saskatchewan (Woytowich) 🔨	0	0	0	1	0	0	0	1	2	0	1	5
Newfoundland (Boland)	0	1	0	0	0	2	0	0	0	1	0	4

Sheet B	1	2	3	4	5	6	7	8	9	10	11	Final
Prince Edward Island (Campbell) 🔨	1	1	0	0	0	1	0	0	0	0	1	4
Quebec (Adams)	0	0	0	2	0	0	0	1	0	0	0	3

Sheet C	1	2	3	4	5	6	7	8	9	10	Final
Alberta (Martin) 🔨	2	0	0	0	0	0	0	1	0	0	3
Manitoba (Stoughton)	0	0	0	1	0	0	0	0	1	0	2

Sheet D	1	2	3	4	5	6	7	8	9	10	Final
Ontario (Howard) 🔨	0	2	1	0	1	1	1	0	1	X	7
Yukon/Northwest Territories (Haines)	1	0	0	2	0	0	0	2	0	X	5

Sheet E	1	2	3	4	5	6	7	8	9	10	Final
Nova Scotia (Bentley) 🔨	1	0	0	2	0	0	1	0	0	0	4
British Columbia (Kent)	0	1	0	0	2	1	0	0	0	1	5

Sheet F	1	2	3	4	5	6	7	8	9	10	11	Final
New Brunswick (Mitchell) 🔨	0	0	1	0	1	0	0	0	1	0	0	3
Northern Ontario (Lang)	0	1	0	0	0	0	1	0	0	1	2	5

== Tiebreaker ==
Sheet C	1	2	3	4	5	6	7	8	9	10	Final
Northern Ontario (Lang) 🔨	1	0	0	0	2	0	0	0	0	X	3
British Columbia (Kent)	0	0	0	1	0	1	1	1	2	X	6

Player Percentages
Northern Ontario		British Columbia	
Art Lappalainen	84%	Ken McHargue	80%
Ross Tetley	79%	Tom Shypitka	75%
Scott Henderson	80%	Brian Collison	70%
Rick Lang	70%	Gerry Kent	80%
Total	78%	Total	76%

== Playoffs ==
Semifinal			Final
			1	Saskatchewan	4
2	Alberta	4	2	Alberta	8
3	British Columbia	3

=== Semifinal ===
Sheet C	1	2	3	4	5	6	7	8	9	10	Final
Alberta (Martin) 🔨	0	1	0	2	0	0	0	0	0	1	4
British Columbia (Kent)	0	0	1	0	1	0	1	0	0	0	3

Player Percentages
Alberta		British Columbia	
Don Bartlett	89%	Ken McHargue	90%
Dan Petryk	81%	Tom Shypitka	84%
Kevin Park	73%	Brian Collison	75%
Kevin Martin	71%	Gerry Kent	69%
Total	79%	Total	79%

=== Final ===
Sheet C	1	2	3	4	5	6	7	8	9	10	Final
Saskatchewan (Woytowich) 🔨	2	0	1	0	0	0	0	1	0	X	4
Alberta (Martin)	0	2	0	0	0	4	2	0	0	X	8

Player Percentages
Saskatchewan		Alberta	
John Grundy	63%	Don Bartlett	92%
Wyatt Buck	86%	Dan Petryk	94%
Brian McCusker	71%	Kevin Park	95%
Randy Woytowich	60%	Kevin Martin	83%
Total	70%	Total	91%

== Statistics ==
=== Top 5 player percentages ===
Round Robin only

Leads	%
(Quebec) Andrew Carter	89
(Alberta) Don Bartlett	88
(Northern Ontario) Art Lappalainen	87
(Ontario) Peter Corner	86
(British Columbia) Ken McHargue	85

Seconds	%
(Quebec) Don Reddick	89
(Alberta) Dan Petryk	86
(Ontario) Wayne Middaugh	84
(Manitoba) Ken Tresoor	83
(British Columbia) Tom Shypitka	82

Thirds	%
(Alberta) Kevin Park	85
(Manitoba) Dave Iverson	82
(Saskatchewan) Brian McCusker	82
(Ontario) Glenn Howard	82
(Northern Ontario) Scott Henderson	79

Skips	%
(Saskatchewan) Randy Woytowich	85
(Manitoba) Jeff Stoughton	81
(Northern Ontario) Rick Lang	79
(Alberta) Kevin Martin	79
(Nova Scotia) Dan Bentley	76

=== Team percentages ===
Round Robin only

Province	Skip	%
Alberta	Kevin Martin	84
Saskatchewan	Randy Woytowich	83
Ontario	Russ Howard	82
Manitoba	Jeff Stoughton	82
Quebec	Kevin Adams	82
Northern Ontario	Rick Lang	82
British Columbia	Gerry Kent	79
Nova Scotia	Dan Bentley	79
Prince Edward Island	Robert Campbell	78
Newfoundland	John Boland	77
New Brunswick	Gary Mitchell	75
Yukon/Northwest Territories	Chuck Haines	75
