= Daryell Nowlan =

Canadian curler

- Curler
- Born: June 4, 1969 (age 57); Lahr, West Germany

Team
- Curling club: Curl Moncton, Moncton, NB

Curling career
- Member Association: Prince Edward Island (1986–1996); New Brunswick (1996–present)
- Brier: 2 (1994, 1997)
Medal record
Men's curling
Representing New Brunswick
Tim Hortons Brier
Bronze medal – third place	1997 Calgary

Daryell Nowlan (born June 4, 1969 in Lahr, West Germany) is a Canadian curler and curling coach from Moncton, New Brunswick. He is originally from Summerside, Prince Edward Island. He currently coaches the Sylvie Quillian rink.

== Career ==
In juniors, Nowlan represented Prince Edward Island three times at Canadian Junior Curling Championships from 1986–1988. He went 4–7 in 1986 as second for James McCarthy and 3–8 in both in 1987 and in 1988 as third for McCarthy.

Nowlan made his first Tim Hortons Brier appearance in 1994 at the 1994 Labatt Brier in Red Deer, Alberta. He was the alternate for the PEI rink skipped by Mike Gaudet. They finished last with a 2–9 record. Nowlan didn't play in any games. He would then move to New Brunswick and join the James Grattan rink as second. This team won the New Brunswick provincial championship in 1997 and represented NB at the 1997 Labatt Brier. They had a fast start, winning 5 out of their first 6 games eventually qualifying for the playoffs with an 8–3 record. They defeated Ontario's Ed Werenich 6–4 in the 3 vs 4 game before falling to Manitoba's Vic Peters in the semifinal, settling for bronze.

== Coaching ==
Nowlan has coached teams at the Scotties, Brier, Canadian Juniors, Under 18's and the World Juniors. Notable skips he has coached include Andrea Kelly, Russ Howard, Charley Thomas, James Grattan, Sylvie Quillian and Kim Dolan.

== Personal life ==
Nowlan is the Vice president at the Atlantic Canada Opportunities Agency. He has two sons, Josh and Jacob who he coached at the 2019 Canadian U18 Curling Championships.

== Teams ==
Season	Skip	Third	Second	Lead
1985–86	James McCarthy	Daryell Nowlan	Paul Snively	Paul Power
1986–87	James McCarthy	Daryell Nowlan	Paul Power	Ian Power
1987–88	James McCarthy	Daryell Nowlan	Paul Power	Ian Power
1996–97	James Grattan	Charlie Sullivan	Daryell Nowlan	Jeff Lacey
1998–99	James Grattan	Charlie Sullivan	Spencer Mawhinney	Daryell Nowlan
1999–00	Mike Kennedy	Terry Odishaw	Marc LeCocq	Daryell Nowlan
2000–01	Terry Odishaw	Dave Nowlan	Daryell Nowlan	Kevin Keefe
