= 2006 Ontario Kia Cup =

- Host city: Guelph, Ontario
- Arena: Guelph Sports Centre
- Dates: February 6-12
- Winner: Team Howard
- Curling club: Coldwater & District CC, Coldwater, Ontario
- Skip: Glenn Howard
- Third: Richard Hart
- Second: Brent Laing
- Lead: Craig Savill
- Finalist: Wayne Middaugh

The 2006 Kia Cup, southern Ontario men's provincial curling championship was held February 6–12 at the Guelph Sports Centre in Guelph, Ontario. The winning team of Glenn Howard would represent Ontario at the 2006 Tim Hortons Brier in Regina, Saskatchewan.

== Qualification ==
Qualification method	Berths	Qualifying team(s)
Region 1	2	Bryan Cochrane; Willie Jeffries
Region 2	2	Wayne Middaugh; Mike Harris
Region 3	2	Pat Ferris; Dale Matchett
Region 4	2	Todd Brandwood; Rob Todd
Challenge Round East	1	John Epping
Challenge Round West	1	Glenn Howard

== Teams ==
Skip	Third	Second	Lead
Todd Brandwood	Scott Banner	Bill Buchanan	Brad Hiscock
Bryan Cochrane	Chris Fulton	Jeff Henderson	John Steski
John Epping	Nick Rizzo	Scott Foster	Rob Brockbank
Pat Ferris	Dayna Deruelle	Derek Abbotts	Dwayne Pyper
Mike Harris	John Base	Ian Tetley	Trevor Wall
Glenn Howard	Richard Hart	Brent Laing	Craig Savill
Willie Jeffries	Spencer Cooper	Mark Rodgers	Nicolas Aubin
Dale Matchett	Ryan Werenich	Jeff Gorda	Shawn Kaufman
Wayne Middaugh	Peter Corner	Phil Loevenmark	Scott Bailey
Rob Todd	Chris DeCloet	Barry Campbell	Chris O'Neill

== Standings ==
Skip	Club	Wins	Losses
Wayne Middaugh	St. George's Golf & Country Club	7	2
Glenn Howard	Coldwater & District Curling Club	7	2
Mike Harris	Oakville Curling Club	7	2
Dale Matchett	Churchill Curling Club	4	5
John Epping	Omemee Curling Club	4	5
Willie Jeffries	Huntley Curling Club	4	5
Rob Todd	Brant Curling Club	3	6
Bryan Cochrane	Ottawa Curling Club	3	6
Todd Brandwood	Glendale Golf & Country Club	3	6
Pat Ferris	Grey Granite Club	3	6

Tie-breakers

- Matchett 11-9 Jeffries
- Matchett 7-5 Epping

== Playoffs ==
Page playoff system
1	Wayne Middaugh	7
2	Glenn Howard	8
3	Mike Harris	8
4	Dale Matchett	3

Semifinal
1	Wayne Middaugh	9
3	Mike Harris	5

Final
2	Glenn Howard	9
1	Wayne Middaugh	6

== Sources ==
- Webarchive - 2006 Kia Cup
