= Knut Ivar Moe =

Norwegian male curler and coach

- Curler ♂
- Born: 29 July 1960 (age 66); Lillehammer

Team
- Curling club: Stabekk CC, Oslo, Lillehammer Curlingklubb, Lillehammer

Curling career
- Member Association: Norway
- World Championship: 1 (1997)
Medal record
Curling
Norwegian Men's Championship
Gold medal – first place	1997

Knut Ivar Moe (born 29 July 1960 in Lillehammer) is a Norwegian curler and curling coach.

At the national level, he is a 1997 Norwegian men's champion curler.

== Teams ==
Season	Skip	Third	Second	Lead	Alternate	Events
1996–97	Pål Trulsen	Lars Vågberg	Bent Ånund Ramsfjell	Knut Ivar Moe	Morten Halsa	NMCC 1997 (gold); WCC 1997 (7th)
2006–07	Niklas Edin	Petter Moe	Christoffer Svae	Håvard Vad Petersson	Knut Ivar Moe	

== Record as a coach of national teams ==
Year	Tournament, event	National team	Place
1999	1999 World Junior Curling Championships	Norway (junior men)	7
2000	2000 World Junior Curling Championships	Norway (junior men)	9
2000	2000 World Junior Curling Championships	Norway (junior women)	8
2001	2001 World Junior B Curling Championships	Norway (junior men)	4
2003	2003 World Junior Curling Championships	Norway (junior men)	4
