= Dieter Kolb =

German curler and coach

- Curler ♂
- Born: c. 1967

Team
- Curling club: SC Riessersee, EC Oberstdorf, EV Füssen, Füssen

Curling career
- Member Association: Germany
- World Championship: 1 (1988)
- Olympic: 1 (1988 – demo)
- Other appearances: World Junior Championships: 1 (1986)
Medal record
Curling
German Men's Championship
Bronze medal – third place	1992

Dieter Kolb (born c. 1967) is a German curler, curling coach and sport manager.

He participated in the demonstration curling events at the 1988 Winter Olympics, where the German team finished in seventh place.

As a coach of German national women team he participated at the 2002 Winter Olympics.

From 2004 to 2015 he was a president of German Curling Association (Deutscher Curling Verband, DCV). From 2000 to 2006 he was a vice-president of European Curling Federation.

== Teams ==
Season	Skip	Third	Second	Lead	Alternate	Coach	Events
1985–86	Dieter Kolb	Oliver Schob	George Geiger	Oliver Kosbadt			WJCC 1986 (4th)
1987–88	Rainer Schöpp	Dieter Kolb	Norbert Petrasch	Reinhard Ernst			WCC 1988 (6th)
1987–88	Andy Kapp	Florian Zörgiebel	Cristopher Huber	Michael Schäffer	Dieter Kolb	Rodger Gustaf Schmidt	WOG 1988 (demo) (7th)
1991–92	Dieter Kolb	?	?	?			GMCC 1992 (bronze)

== Record as a coach of national teams ==
Year	Tournament, event	National team	Place
2000	2000 European Curling Championships	Germany (men)	6
2002	2002 Winter Olympics	Germany (women)	5
