= 1997 World Men's Curling Championship =

- Host city: Bern, Switzerland
- Arena: Allmend Stadium
- Dates: April 12–20, 1997
- Winner: Sweden
- Curling club: Östersunds CK, Östersund
- Skip: Peja Lindholm
- Third: Tomas Nordin
- Second: Magnus Swartling
- Lead: Peter Narup
- Alternate: Marcus Feldt
- Finalist: Germany (Andy Kapp)

The 1997 World Men's Curling Championship (branded as 1997 Ford World Men's Curling Championship for sponsorship reasons) was held at Allmend Stadium in Bern, Switzerland from April 12–20, 1997.

== Teams ==
Australia	Canada	Denmark	Finland
Sydney Harbour CC, Sydney Skip: Hugh Millikin; Third: Gerald Chick; Second: Stephen Johns; Lead: Stephen Hewitt; Alternate: Jonathan Wade	Ottewell CC, Edmonton, Alberta Skip: Kevin Martin; Third: Don Walchuk; Second: Rudy Ramcharan; Lead: Don Bartlett; Alternate: Jules Owchar	Hvidovre CC, Hvidovre Skip: Ulrik Schmidt; Third: Lasse Lavrsen; Second: Brian Hansen; Lead: Ulrik Damm; Alternate: Carsten Svensgaard	Hyvinkää CC, Hyvinkää Skip: Markku Uusipaavalniemi; Third: Wille Mäkelä; Second: Jussi Uusipaavalniemi; Lead: Tommi Häti; Alternate: Jouni Weckman
Germany	Norway	Scotland	Sweden
Füssen CC, Füssen Skip: Andy Kapp; Third: Uli Kapp; Second: Oliver Axnick; Lead: Holger Höhne; Alternate: Michael Schäffer	Stabekk CC, Oslo Skip: Pål Trulsen; Third: Lars Vågberg; Second: Bent Ånund Ramsfjell; Lead: Knut Ivar Moe; Alternate: Morten Halsa	Castle Kennedy CC, Stranraer Skip: Hammy McMillan; Third: Norman Brown; Second: Mike Hay; Lead: Brian Binnie; Alternate: Peter Loudon	Östersunds CK, Östersund Skip: Peja Lindholm; Third: Tomas Nordin; Second: Magnus Swartling; Lead: Peter Narup; Alternate: Marcus Feldt
Switzerland	United States		
Basel-Ysfäger CC, Basel Skip: Patrick Netzer; Third: Markus Widmer; Second: Damian Grichting; Lead: Fabian Burckhardt; Alternate: Tobias Treyer	Langdon CC, Langdon Skip: Craig Disher; Third: Kevin Kakela; Second: Joel Jacobson; Lead: Paul Peterson; Alternate: Randy Darling		

== Round robin standings ==
Key
Teams to playoffs

Country	Skip	W	L
Canada	Kevin Martin	7	2
Scotland	Hammy McMillan	7	2
Germany	Andy Kapp	6	3
Sweden	Peja Lindholm	6	3
Denmark	Ulrik Schmidt	5	4
United States	Craig Disher	4	5
Australia	Hugh Millikin	3	6
Norway	Pål Trulsen	3	6
Switzerland	Patrick Netzer	3	6
Finland	Markku Uusipaavalniemi	1	8

== Round robin results ==
=== Draw 1 ===
Sheet A	Final
Canada (Martin)	9
Sweden (Lindholm)	6

Sheet B	Final
Germany (Kapp)	7
Finland (Uusipaavalniemi)	6

Sheet C	Final
United States (Disher)	9
Australia (Millikin)	5

Sheet D	Final
Scotland (McMillan)	3
Switzerland (Netzer)	6

Sheet E	Final
Norway (Trulsen)	5
Denmark (Schmidt)	7

=== Draw 2 ===
Sheet A	Final
Norway (Trulsen)	7
Finland (Uusipaavalniemi)	5

Sheet B	Final
Denmark (Schmidt)	4
Australia (Millikin)	3

Sheet C	Final
Canada (Martin)	7
Scotland (McMillan)	6

Sheet D	Final
United States (Disher)	7
Sweden (Lindholm)	8

Sheet E	Final
Germany (Kapp)	5
Switzerland (Netzer)	4

=== Draw 3 ===
Sheet A	Final
Switzerland (Netzer)	3
Denmark (Schmidt)	8

Sheet B	Final
Scotland (McMillan)	8
Sweden (Lindholm)	3

Sheet C	Final
Germany (Kapp)	5
Norway (Trulsen)	4

Sheet D	Final
Australia (Millikin)	5
Canada (Martin)	8

Sheet E	Final
United States (Disher)	5
Finland (Uusipaavalniemi)	6

=== Draw 4 ===
Sheet A	Final
Sweden (Lindholm)	3
Germany (Kapp)	12

Sheet B	Final
Canada (Martin)	7
United States (Disher)	5

Sheet C	Final
Finland (Uusipaavalniemi)	4
Denmark (Schmidt)	7

Sheet D	Final
Switzerland (Netzer)	5
Norway (Trulsen)	7

Sheet E	Final
Scotland (McMillan)	9
Australia (Millikin)	5

=== Draw 5 ===
Sheet A	Final
United States (Disher)	6
Norway (Trulsen)	5

Sheet B	Final
Australia (Millikin)	8
Germany (Kapp)	6

Sheet C	Final
Switzerland (Netzer)	4
Sweden (Lindholm)	12

Sheet D	Final
Finland (Uusipaavalniemi)	1
Scotland (McMillan)	9

Sheet E	Final
Denmark (Schmidt)	8
Canada (Martin)	6

=== Draw 6 ===
Sheet A	Final
Denmark (Schmidt)	3
Scotland (McMillan)	5

Sheet B	Final
Switzerland (Netzer)	4
Canada (Martin)	7

Sheet C	Final
Australia (Millikin)	8
Finland (Uusipaavalniemi)	4

Sheet D	Final
Germany (Kapp)	6
United States (Disher)	8

Sheet E	Final
Sweden (Lindholm)	6
Norway (Trulsen)	4

=== Draw 7 ===
Sheet A	Final
Finland (Uusipaavalniemi)	2
Canada (Martin)	10

Sheet B	Final
Sweden (Lindholm)	6
Denmark (Schmidt)	4

Sheet C	Final
Scotland (McMillan)	5
Germany (Kapp)	2

Sheet D	Final
Norway (Trulsen)	7
Australia (Millikin)	6

Sheet E	Final
Switzerland (Netzer)	8
United States (Disher)	6

=== Draw 8 ===
Sheet A	Final
Australia (Millikin)	8
Switzerland (Netzer)	7

Sheet B	Final
Norway (Trulsen)	4
Scotland (McMillan)	5

Sheet C	Final
Denmark (Schmidt)	8
United States (Disher)	9

Sheet D	Final
Sweden (Lindholm)	8
Finland (Uusipaavalniemi)	7

Sheet E	Final
Canada (Martin)	6
Germany (Kapp)	7

=== Draw 9 ===
Sheet A	Final
Scotland (McMillan)	7
United States (Disher)	6

Sheet B	Final
Finland (Uusipaavalniemi)	7
Switzerland (Netzer)	9

Sheet C	Final
Norway (Trulsen)	6
Canada (Martin)	11

Sheet D	Final
Denmark (Schmidt)	6
Germany (Kapp)	7

Sheet E	Final
Australia (Millikin)	5
Sweden (Lindholm)	7

== Playoffs ==
Semi-final
1	Canada	4
4	Sweden	6
2	Scotland	3
3	Germany	6

Final
4	Sweden	6
3	Germany	3
Bronze medal
1	Canada	4
2	Scotland	8

=== Final ===
Sheet A	1	2	3	4	5	6	7	8	9	10	Final
Sweden (Lindholm)	0	0	1	0	0	0	4	0	1	X	6
Germany (Kapp)	0	1	0	0	1	0	0	1	0	X	3

1997 Ford World Curling Championship
(Sweden)
Sweden
3rd title
