= Spencer Mawhinney =

Canadian curler

- Curler
- Born: May 30, 1977 (age 49); Saint John, New Brunswick

Team
- Curling club: Thistle-St. Andrews CC, Saint John, NB
- Skip: Jason Roach
- Third: Darren Roach
- Second: Spencer Mawhinney
- Lead: Jared Bezanson

Curling career
- Member Association: New Brunswick
- Brier: 1 (2017)
- Top CTRS ranking: 137th (2015–16)

Spencer Mawhinney (born May 30, 1977) is a Canadian curler from Saint John, New Brunswick. He currently plays second on Team Jason Roach.

== Career ==
Mawhinney made the playoffs at the 2009 Alexander Keith's Tankard as lead for Charlie Sullivan. They lost in the semifinal to Rick Perron. He lost in the semifinal in 2011 as well, as lead for Paul Dobson.

In 2017, Mawhinney and his rink of Sullivan, Dobson and Mark Dobson made the final of the 2017 Pepsi Tankard. They had finished 4–3 in the round robin and defeated James Grattan in the semifinal. They took control of the game in the second end by stealing three after Mike Kennedy missed his last shot. The game was tied 4–4 in the ninth before Team Sullivan gave up a steal of three, ultimately losing the match 7–5. Mawhinney was invited to be Team Kennedy's fifth at the 2017 Tim Hortons Brier where he played in one game and the team finished with a 1–10 record. Mawhinney curled 96% in the game he played against Team Canada's Kevin Koe.

== Teams ==
Season	Skip	Third	Second	Lead
1998–99	James Grattan	Charlie Sullivan	Spencer Mawhinney	Daryell Nowlan
2003–04	James Grattan	Kevin Boyle	Spencer Mawhinney	Jeff Lacey
2004–05	Kevin Boyle (Fourth)	Mark Dobson	Spencer Mawhinney	Andy McCann (Skip)
2009–10	Jim Sullivan	Charlie Sullivan	Kevin Boyle	Spencer Mawhinney
2010–11	Paul Dobson	Kevin Boyle	Mark Dobson	Spencer Mawhinney
2011–12	Paul Dobson	Kevin Boyle	Mark Dobson	Spencer Mawhinney
2012–13	Paul Dobson	Peter Case	Mark Dobson	Spencer Mawhinney
2013–14	Paul Dobson	Kevin Boyle	Mark Dobson	Spencer Mawhinney
2014–15	Terry Odishaw	Paul Dobson	Mark Dobson	Spencer Mawhinney
2015–16	Peter Case	Paul Dobson	Mark Dobson	Spencer Mawhinney
2016–17	Paul Dobson	Charlie Sullivan	Mark Dobson	Spencer Mawhinney
2017–18	Paul Dobson	Charlie Sullivan	Mark Dobson	Spencer Mawhinney
2018–19	Paul Dobson	Spencer Watts	Mark Dobson	Spencer Mawhinney
2019–20	Jason Roach	Darren Roach	Spencer Mawhinney	Jared Bezanson
