= 2009 Alexander Keith's Tankard =

- Host city: Saint John, New Brunswick
- Arena: Thistle St. Andrews Curling Club
- Dates: February 11–15
- Winner: Team Howard
- Curling club: Gage G&CC, Oromocto
- Skip: Russ Howard
- Third: James Grattan
- Second: Steven Howard
- Lead: Peter Case
- Alternate: Jason Vaughan
- Finalist: Rick Perron

The 2009 Alexander Keith's Tankard, the provincial men's curling championship for New Brunswick, was held from February 11 to 15 at the Thistle St. Andrews Curling Club in Saint John, New Brunswick. The winning Russ Howard rink represented New Brunswick at the 2009 Tim Hortons Brier in Calgary, Alberta.

== Teams ==
The teams are listed as follows:

Skip	Vice	Second	Lead	Alternate	Club
Mark Armstrong	Terry Roach	Matt Hughes	Joe Vautour	Zack Smith	Riverside G&CC, Rothesay
Derek Ellard	David Nowlan	Shaun Mott	Nick McCann	Kendall McCann	Fredericton CC, Fredericton
Russ Howard	James Grattan	Steve Howard	Peter Case	Jason Vaughan	Gage G&CC, Oromocto
Mike Kennedy	Ryan Sherrard	Jeff Henderson	Adam Firth	Ron Burgess	Grand Falls CC, Grand Falls
Marc Lecocq	Jim Sullivan	Jason Roach	Andy McCann		Thistle St. Andrews CC, Saint John
Terry Odishaw	Jeremy Mallais	Grant Odishaw	Chris Jeffrey	Kevin Keefe	Curling Beauséjour, Moncton
Rick Perron	Scott Jones	Pierre Fraser	Jared Bezanson		Beaver CC, Moncton
Charlie Sullivan	Kevin Boyle	Paul Nason	Spencer Mawhinney		Thistle St. Andrews CC, Saint John

== Round robin standings ==
Final Round Robin standings

Key
Teams to Playoffs
Teams to Tiebreaker

Skip	W	L	W–L	PF	PA	EW	EL	BE	SE
Russ Howard	5	2	–	53	39	31	29	3	7
Charlie Sullivan	4	3	2–0	38	33	26	23	7	9
Terry Odishaw	4	3	1–1	43	41	26	26	6	6
Rick Perron	4	3	0–2	53	42	29	28	5	8
Mike Kennedy	3	4	2–0	50	48	31	27	3	10
Marc Lecocq	3	4	1–1	46	52	27	30	5	6
Mark Armstrong	3	4	0–2	36	43	25	25	8	7
Derek Ellard	2	5	–	32	51	23	28	7	6

== Round Robin results ==
All draw times listed in Atlantic Time (UTC−04:00).

=== Draw 1 ===
Wednesday, February 11, 7:00 pm

Sheet 5	1	2	3	4	5	6	7	8	9	10	Final
Russ Howard	0	2	0	0	2	1	0	1	0	1	7
Terry Odishaw 🔨	0	0	0	2	0	0	1	0	2	0	5

Sheet 6	1	2	3	4	5	6	7	8	9	10	Final
Rick Perron	1	0	0	4	0	0	1	0	2	3	11
Derek Ellard 🔨	0	0	4	0	0	1	0	2	0	0	7

Sheet 7	1	2	3	4	5	6	7	8	9	10	Final
Marc Lecocq 🔨	0	0	2	0	4	0	4	0	0	X	10
Mark Armstrong	0	2	0	2	0	3	0	0	1	X	8

Sheet 8	1	2	3	4	5	6	7	8	9	10	Final
Charlie Sullivan 🔨	2	0	0	1	0	3	0	1	1	0	8
Mike Kennedy	0	0	1	0	1	0	3	0	0	2	7

=== Draw 2 ===
Thursday, February 12, 9:00 am

Sheet 5	1	2	3	4	5	6	7	8	9	10	Final
Mark Armstrong	0	1	0	0	0	0	0	2	0	1	4
Charlie Sullivan 🔨	0	0	0	1	0	0	0	0	1	0	2

Sheet 6	1	2	3	4	5	6	7	8	9	10	11	Final
Mike Kennedy	0	0	3	0	1	0	1	0	0	1	1	7
Marc Lecocq 🔨	0	0	0	2	0	2	0	1	1	0	0	6

Sheet 7	1	2	3	4	5	6	7	8	9	10	Final
Terry Odishaw	0	1	1	0	3	0	0	0	1	1	7
Rick Perron 🔨	1	0	0	2	0	2	0	1	0	0	6

Sheet 8	1	2	3	4	5	6	7	8	9	10	Final
Derek Ellard 🔨	0	0	0	1	0	1	0	X	X	X	2
Russ Howard	2	0	1	0	2	0	4	X	X	X	9

=== Draw 3 ===
Thursday, February 12, 2:00 pm

Sheet 5	1	2	3	4	5	6	7	8	9	10	Final
Marc Lecocq 🔨	2	1	2	0	0	2	0	X	X	X	7
Derek Ellard	0	0	0	2	1	0	1	X	X	X	4

Sheet 6	1	2	3	4	5	6	7	8	9	10	Final
Charlie Sullivan	2	0	0	1	0	3	1	X	X	X	7
Terry Odishaw 🔨	0	1	0	0	0	0	0	X	X	X	1

Sheet 7	1	2	3	4	5	6	7	8	9	10	Final
Russ Howard 🔨	0	3	0	2	0	2	0	0	0	0	7
Mike Kennedy	0	0	3	0	1	0	3	0	1	1	9

Sheet 8	1	2	3	4	5	6	7	8	9	10	Final
Rick Perron	1	0	1	0	2	1	0	0	2	X	7
Mark Armstrong 🔨	0	1	0	1	0	0	1	1	0	X	4

=== Draw 4 ===
Thursday, February 12, 7:00 pm

Sheet 5	1	2	3	4	5	6	7	8	9	10	Final
Rick Perron 🔨	0	3	0	2	0	0	0	4	0	X	9
Mike Kennedy	1	0	1	0	2	1	0	0	2	X	7

Sheet 6	1	2	3	4	5	6	7	8	9	10	Final
Russ Howard	0	0	1	1	0	2	0	0	1	1	6
Mark Armstrong 🔨	1	1	0	0	2	0	2	1	0	0	7

Sheet 7	1	2	3	4	5	6	7	8	9	10	Final
Derek Ellard	0	0	1	0	0	2	0	0	1	1	5
Charlie Sullivan 🔨	0	0	0	1	0	0	0	2	0	0	3

Sheet 8	1	2	3	4	5	6	7	8	9	10	Final
Terry Odishaw 🔨	1	0	1	0	2	0	2	0	1	0	7
Marc Lecocq	0	3	0	2	0	1	0	0	0	2	8

=== Draw 5 ===
Friday, February 13, 2:00 pm

Sheet 5	1	2	3	4	5	6	7	8	9	10	Final
Mark Armstrong 🔨	0	1	0	0	0	0	1	0	X	X	2
Terry Odishaw	0	0	2	2	1	0	0	3	X	X	8

Sheet 6	1	2	3	4	5	6	7	8	9	10	Final
Charlie Sullivan	0	1	0	0	0	0	2	0	2	1	6
Rick Perron 🔨	0	0	0	0	0	3	0	1	0	0	4

Sheet 7	1	2	3	4	5	6	7	8	9	10	Final
Marc Lecocq 🔨	1	0	2	0	0	1	0	1	0	X	5
Russ Howard	0	1	0	2	0	0	1	0	5	X	9

Sheet 8	1	2	3	4	5	6	7	8	9	10	11	Final
Mike Kennedy	1	0	0	2	1	1	0	0	0	1	0	6
Derek Ellard 🔨	0	1	1	0	0	0	3	1	0	0	1	7

=== Draw 6 ===
Friday, February 13, 7:00 pm

Sheet 5	1	2	3	4	5	6	7	8	9	10	Final
Marc Lecocq 🔨	0	2	1	0	0	1	0	X	X	X	4
Rick Perron	1	0	0	3	3	0	3	X	X	X	10

Sheet 6	1	2	3	4	5	6	7	8	9	10	Final
Terry Odishaw	2	0	1	0	0	3	0	0	0	2	8
Mike Kennedy 🔨	0	2	0	2	0	0	0	3	0	0	7

Sheet 7	1	2	3	4	5	6	7	8	9	10	Final
Mark Armstrong	0	2	0	1	0	3	0	2	X	X	8
Derek Ellard 🔨	0	0	0	0	1	0	2	0	X	X	3

Sheet 8	1	2	3	4	5	6	7	8	9	10	Final
Russ Howard 🔨	0	1	3	0	0	2	0	2	0	X	8
Charlie Sullivan	0	0	0	1	1	0	1	0	2	X	5

=== Draw 7 ===
Saturday, February 14, 9:00 am

Sheet 5	1	2	3	4	5	6	7	8	9	10	Final
Mike Kennedy	0	0	2	0	2	0	2	0	1	X	7
Mark Armstrong 🔨	0	0	0	1	0	1	0	1	0	X	3

Sheet 6	1	2	3	4	5	6	7	8	9	10	Final
Rick Perron	1	0	1	0	1	0	1	0	1	1	6
Russ Howard 🔨	0	2	0	2	0	1	0	2	0	0	7

Sheet 7	1	2	3	4	5	6	7	8	9	10	11	Final
Charlie Sullivan	2	0	0	2	0	1	0	0	0	1	1	7
Marc Lecocq 🔨	0	1	1	0	2	0	1	0	1	0	0	6

Sheet 8	1	2	3	4	5	6	7	8	9	10	Final
Derek Ellard 🔨	1	0	0	1	0	1	0	1	0	X	4
Terry Odishaw	0	2	0	0	2	0	2	0	1	X	7

== Tiebreaker ==
Saturday February 14, 2:00 pm

Sheet 5	1	2	3	4	5	6	7	8	9	10	11	Final
Terry Odishaw	2	0	0	1	1	1	0	1	0	1	0	7
Rick Perron 🔨	0	2	1	0	0	0	2	0	2	0	2	9

== Playoffs ==
Semifinal			Final
			1	Russ Howard	9
2	Charlie Sullivan	7	3	Rick Perron	6
3	Rick Perron	8

=== Semifinal ===
Saturday, February 14, 7:00 pm

Sheet 5	1	2	3	4	5	6	7	8	9	10	11	Final
Rick Perron 🔨	1	0	0	2	0	2	0	2	0	0	1	8
Charlie Sullivan	0	0	1	0	3	0	1	0	0	2	0	7

=== Final ===
Sunday, February 15, 2:00 pm

Sheet 5	1	2	3	4	5	6	7	8	9	10	Final
Rick Perron 🔨	0	1	0	1	0	3	0	0	1	0	6
Russ Howard	0	0	2	0	2	0	1	2	0	2	9

2009 Alexander Keith's Tankard

Russ Howard
6th New Brunswick Provincial Championship title
