= Morten Halsa =

Norwegian male curler

- Curler ♂
- Born: 16 June 1965
- Died: 14 August 2009 (aged 44)

Team
- Curling club: Stabekk CC, Oslo, Lillehammer Curlingklubb Lillehammer

Curling career
- Member Association: Norway
- World Championship: 1 (1997)
- Other appearances: World Junior Championships: 1 (1986)
Medal record
Curling
Norwegian Men's Championship
Gold medal – first place	1997

Morten Halsa was a Norwegian curler.

At the national level, he was a 1997 Norwegian men's champion curler.

== Teams ==
Season	Skip	Third	Second	Lead	Alternate	Events
1985–86	Bjørn Ulshagen	Knut Johansen	Morten Halsa	Bjarte Pisani		WJCC 1986 (6th)
1996–97	Pål Trulsen	Lars Vågberg	Bent Ånund Ramsfjell	Knut Ivar Moe	Morten Halsa	NMCC 1997 (gold); WCC 1997 (7th)
