= Don Walchuk =

Canadian curler

Donald J. Walchuk
- Curler
- Born: March 6, 1963 (age 63); Melville, Saskatchewan

Curling career
- Brier: 8 (1985, 1987, 1988, 1989, 1996, 1997, 2000, 2006)
- World Championship: 3 (1988, 1989, 1997)
- Olympic: 1 (2002)
- Top CTRS ranking: 1st (2004–05, 2005–06)
- Grand Slam victories: 5: World Cup (Jan 2003); The National (Nov. 2004)); Players' (2005); Canadian Open (2002, 2005)
Medal record
Men's Curling
Representing Canada
Olympic Games
Silver medal – second place	2002 Salt Lake City
World Curling Championships
Gold medal – first place	1989 Milwaukee
Silver medal – second place	1988 Lausanne
Representing Alberta
Brier
Gold medal – first place	1988 Chicoutimi
Gold medal – first place	1989 Saskatoon
Gold medal – first place	1997 Calgary
Silver medal – second place	1985 Moncton
Silver medal – second place	1996 Kamloops
Canadian Olympic Curling Trials
Gold medal – first place	2001 Regina
Silver medal – second place	1987 Calgary
Silver medal – second place	1997 Brandon

Donald J. Walchuk (born March 6, 1963, in Melville, Saskatchewan) is a Canadian curler from Edmonton, Alberta. For many years Walchuk played third for Kevin Martin's team, winning a silver medal at the 2002 Winter Olympics. On Martin's rink, Walchuk was known especially for his "high heat" - his big-weight takeout shots.

== Curling career ==
Walchuk played for Pat Ryan as his lead (1985–1986) and his second (1987–1989). With Ryan, Walchuk won four provincial championships, two Briers (1988, 1989) and a World Championship (1989).

After playing with Ryan, he played for Randy Ferbey in 1990 as his third, then skipped his own team from 1992 to 1994.

Walchuk joined Kevin Martin's team as third prior to the 1996 season. With Martin, he won the Brier in 1997, an Olympic silver medal in 2002, Canada Cup's in 2005 and 2006 and four Alberta provincial championships.

On May 7, 2008, Walchuk officially joined Team Kerry Burtnyk. Burtnyk, a two time Brier winner and gold and bronze medal winner at the world championships, recruited Walchuk as third to replace Dan Kammerlock. The foursome was rounded out by Richard Daneault (second) and Garth Smith (lead).

In 2010, Walchuk left the Burtnyk rink to form his own team with Chris Schille, D. J. Kidby and Don Bartlett.

== Personal life ==
Walchuk is an investment advisor for Raymond James Ltd. He is married to Laurie Latter Walchuk. Together they have four children.
