= 1986 World Junior Curling Championships =

- Host city: Dartmouth, Nova Scotia, Canada
- Dates: March 16–22
- Men's winner: Scotland (3rd title)
- Curling club: Gogar Park CC, Edinburgh
- Skip: David Aitken
- Third: Robin Halliday
- Second: Peter Smith
- Lead: Harry Reilly
- Finalist: Canada (Kevin Martin)

The 1986 World Junior Curling Championships were held from March 16 to 22 at the Dartmouth Sportsplex in Dartmouth, Nova Scotia, Canada. The tournament only consisted of a men's event.

== Teams ==
Country	Skip	Third	Second	Lead	Curling club
Canada	Kevin Martin	Rick Feeney	Dan Petryk	Mike Berger	
Denmark	Jørgen Larsen	Michael Peterson	Carsten Nyboe	Brian Enggaard	
France	Lionel Tournier	Thierry Mercier	Jean-Francois Delavay	Pascal Coppel	
West Germany	Dieter Kolb	Oliver Schob	George Geiger	Oliver Kosbadt	
Italy	Stefano Ferronato	Gianluca Lorenzi	Elio Maran	Marco Alberti	
Norway	Bjørn Ulshagen	Knut Johansen	Morten Halsa	Bjarte Pisani	
Scotland	David Aitken	Robin Halliday	Peter Smith	Harry Reilly	Gogar Park CC, Edinburgh
Sweden	Örjan Erixon (fourth)	Peter Larsson (skip)	Krister Olsson	Mats Rosenhed	Örebro CK
Switzerland	Markus Eggler	Andreas Stubing	Daniel Bugmann	Pascal Jeanneret	
United States	Scott Brown	Darin Holt	Perry Hillman	Darren Kress	

== Round robin ==
Place	Team	1	2	3	4	5	6	7	8	9	10	Wins	Losses
1	Canada	*	8:3	12:2	8:5	4:2	7:5	11:5	11:2	10:3	10:3	9	0
2	Scotland	3:8	*	9:5	9:5	9:3	10:1	10:3	11:4	14:1	11:4	8	1
3	Germany	2:12	5:9	*	7:9	8:6	6:9	7:6	6:5	9:3	13:0	5	4
4	Sweden	5:8	5:9	9:7	*	5:6	3:7	9:6	7:5	10:8	12:2	5	4
3	Switzerland	2:4	3:9	6:8	6:5	*	7:6	3:5	6:3	13:5	13:4	5	4
4	Norway	5:7	1:10	9:6	7:3	6:7	*	7:5	7:8	11:3	10:8	5	4
7	Denmark	5:11	3:10	6:7	6:9	5:3	5:7	*	8:7	3:11	13:7	3	6
8	United States	2:11	4:11	5:6	5:7	3:6	8:7	7:8	*	7:2	10:4	3	6
9	France	3:10	1:14	3:9	8:10	5:13	3:11	11:3	2:7	*	10:9	2	7
10	Italy	3:10	4:11	0:13	2:12	4:13	8:10	7:13	4:10	9:10	*	0	9

Teams to playoffs
Teams to tiebreaker for 3rd place
Teams to tiebreaker for 4th place

=== Tiebreaker ===
For 3rd place

Team	Final
Germany	5
Switzerland	4

For 4th place

Team	Final
Sweden	9
Norway	5

== Playoffs ==
Semifinals
1	Canada	7
4	Sweden	6
2	Scotland	8
3	Germany	7

Gold Medal Game
1	Canada	6
2	Scotland	7
Bronze Medal Game
4	Sweden	12
3	Germany	7

== Final standings ==
Place	Team	Games played	Wins	Losses
1st place, gold medalist(s)	Scotland	11	10	1
2nd place, silver medalist(s)	Canada	11	10	1
3rd place, bronze medalist(s)	Sweden	12	7	5
4	Germany	12	6	6
5	Switzerland	10	5	5
6	Norway	10	5	5
7	Denmark	9	3	6
8	United States	9	3	6
9	France	9	2	7
10	Italy	9	0	9

== Awards ==
- WJCC Sportsmanship Award: (Scotland) David Aitken

All-Star Team:

- Skip: (Canada) Kevin Martin
- Third: (Canada) Rick Feeney
- Second: (Scotland) Peter Smith
- Lead: (Scotland) Harry Reilly
