= Jules Owchar =

Canadian curler, curling and golf coach

- Curler
- Born: October 12, 1944 (age 82); Lac La Biche, Alberta

Curling career
- Brier: 5 (1991, 1992, 1995, 1996, 1997)
- World Championship: 2 (1991, 1997)
Medal record
Men's curling
Representing Canada
World Curling Championships
Silver medal – second place	1991 Winnipeg
Representing Alberta
Tim Hortons Brier
Gold medal – first place	1991 Hamilton
Gold medal – first place	1997 Calgary
Silver medal – second place	1996 Kamloops
Bronze medal – third place	1992 Regina
Bronze medal – third place	1995 Halifax

Jules Owchar (born October 12, 1944, in Lac La Biche, Alberta) is a Canadian curler, curling coach, and golf coach from Edmonton, Alberta. Owchar is best known as the longtime coach of Kevin Martin, a retired Olympic champion, world champion, and Canadian champion. Owchar is also the curling coach of the Northern Alberta Institute of Technology curling teams. He previously coached Brad Gushue's Newfoundland and Labrador team. Teams coached by Owchar have won eight Briers, one Olympic gold, two silvers, and one bronze; two world championships, 24 Slam titles and 34 conference championship gold medals, as of March 2019 when he was named to Curling Canada's Hall of Fame.

== Career ==
=== Playing career ===
Owchar was officially listed as the alternate for the Kevin Martin team, which he coached, at the 1991, 1992, 1995, 1996, and 1997 Briers. As the alternate, he won various medals with the team, including two Brier titles and a silver medal at the 1991 World Men's Curling Championship.

=== Coaching career ===
Owchar is a Level 3 certified curling coach by the National Coaching Certification Program.

==== Northern Alberta Institute of Technology ====
Owchar began his career at the Northern Alberta Institute of Technology (NAIT) as a physical education instructor in 1969. Throughout his career, he has coached NAIT curling teams to 33 college championships. Along with the golf championships he has also coached his students to, he has over 40 provincial and national championships as a coach. Most recently, he coached the NAIT men's curling team to their first national college championship.

==== Coaching Kevin Martin ====
Owchar began coaching Kevin Martin when he enrolled at NAIT in 1984. Martin had enrolled at NAIT specifically to curl under Owchar, and he and Martin were together for thirty years. In their first few years together, Owchar coached Martin to a Canadian junior title and a silver medal at the World Junior Curling Championships. As they continued, Martin and Owchar made their first Brier appearance in 1991 representing Alberta, and won their first Brier title. Martin then lost the championship game in the world championship later that year. In the next six years, Martin and Owchar returned to the Brier four times, and finished within the top three all four times. However, Martin came up short at the world level, losing the semifinal at the world championship in 1997 and the gold medal game at the 2002 Winter Olympics, which had come down to a draw for the win. Martin also missed another opportunity to represent Canada at the Olympics in 2005.

Martin returned to the Brier in 2006, but failed to advance in the playoffs. However, with a new team and with Owchar continuing to coach, Martin made the playoffs at the 2007 Tim Hortons Brier, won the 2008 and 2009 Briers, and won a gold and silver medal at the 2008 and 2009 world championships, respectively. Then, the next year, Martin won the 2009 Canadian Olympic Curling Trials and the right to represent Canada at his third Olympics, and won his first gold medal at the 2010 Winter Olympics. More recently, Owchar coached Martin to a bronze medal finish at the 2011 Tim Hortons Brier.

Overall, Owchar has coached Martin to a total of ten provincial championships and four Canadian championships. As Martin's coach, he has also coached at three Winter Olympics and four world championships.

==== Heading East ====
After Martin's retirement at the end of the 2014 season, Owchar was recruited by 2006 Olympic gold medalist Brad Gushue to coach his Newfoundland and Labrador team. Since coming on board, the team has achieved much success under Owcher's tutelage, culminating in an emphatic win at the 2017 Tim Hortons Brier on home ground in St. John's and going undefeated to win the 2017 world championship in Edmonton. They repeated as Brier champions in 2018.

Owchar was named to Curling Canada's Hall of Fame at the 2019 Tim Hortons Brier.

== Awards and honours ==
- Petro-Canada Coaching Excellence Award: 2002, 2008, 2009
- NAIT Athletics Wall of Fame: 2003
- Canadian Curling Hall of Fame (2019)
