= Don Bartlett =

Canadian curler and Olympic medalist

- Curler
- Born: April 1, 1960 (age 66); Gander, Newfoundland, Canada

Curling career
- Brier: 8 (1985, 1991, 1992, 1995, 1996, 1997, 2000, 2006)
- World Championship: 2 (1991, 1997)
- Olympic: 1 (2002)
Medal record
Men's curling
Representing Canada
Winter Olympics
Silver medal – second place	2002 Salt Lake City	Team
World Curling Championships
Silver medal – second place	1991 Winnipeg	Team
Representing Alberta
Labatt Brier
Gold medal – first place	1991 Hamilton
Gold medal – first place	1997 Calgary
Silver medal – second place	1985 Moncton
Silver medal – second place	1996 Kamloops
Bronze medal – third place	1992 Regina
Bronze medal – third place	1995 Halifax
Canadian Olympic Curling Trials
Gold medal – first place	2001 Regina
Silver medal – second place	1997 Brandon

Donald Bartlett (born April 1, 1960) is a Canadian curler who lives in Edmonton, Alberta. Bartlett is best known for his many years playing lead for Kevin Martin, winning a silver medal at the 2002 Winter Olympics.

In 1999 Bartlett's home town became host the Don Bartlett Curling Classic. Now an annual curling bonspiel, the tournament attracts many teams from across Canada as well as a number of international competitors.

== Career ==
Don Bartlett played lead for Kevin Martin beginning in 1990. It was in 1991 that the team won the Brier that year. The team would win the 1997 Brier. Internationally, Bartlett has been to two World Curling Championships and two Winter Olympics. At the 1991 Worlds, Martin, third Kevin Park and second Dan Petryk won a silver medal. At the 1992 Winter Olympics (demonstration), the team finished in fourth place. In 1997, the team now consisting of Don Walchuk at third and Rudy Ramcharan at second placed fourth. At the 2002 Winter Olympics now with Carter Rycroft at second, the team won a silver medal. With Martin, Bartlett has been to seven Briers and has won two Canada Cups. Before Martin, Bartlett played with Pat Ryan. He went to the 1985 Brier as his alternate player.

Bartlett was also the coach of Team Rachel Homan until the end of the 2023-24 curling season, coaching the team into winning the 2024 World Women's Curling Championship.

== Personal life ==
Bartlett is retired and has two children.
