= 1999 Players' Championship =

Curling world championship

1999 GMC WCT Players' Championship
- Host city: Winnipeg, Manitoba
- Arena: Max Bell Centre
- Dates: March 17–21
- Attendance: 18,045
- Winner: (Ontario) Team Middaugh
- Curling club: St. George's G&CC, Etobicoke
- Skip: Wayne Middaugh
- Third: Graeme McCarrel
- Second: Ian Tetley
- Lead: Scott Bailey
- Finalist: (Ontario) Russ Howard

The 1999 GMC World Curling Tour Players' Championship, the championship of the men's World Curling Tour (WCT) for the 1998-99 curling season was held March 17–21, 1999 at the Max Bell Centre in Winnipeg, Manitoba. The total purse for the event was $150,000 with $20,000 going to the winning team, plus $1,000 per win and $250 per loss.

Ontario's Team Wayne Middaugh went undefeated en route to Middaugh's third tour championship title, and second as a skip. The team defeated the Russ Howard rink (also from Ontario, but with Howard living in New Brunswick) in the final, 9–5. The victory was helped by a three-ender in the third after Howard missed both of his draws, giving Middaugh an easy draw to take a 4–2 lead up to that point. In the fifth, Howard attempted to tie the game with a tap-back for two, but his rock hit a guard, resulting in a steal of one for Middaugh, who took a 5–2 lead. Middaugh did not look back from there. With the win, he took home $25,000 for the week, and Howard won $19,250.

The event was well attended, with over 18,000 spectators in total, a record for the WCT at that point. It was said more people were turned away from the sold-out final than had attended the entire event in 1997, which was held at Winnipeg's Granite Club.

Games were played in eight ends, instead of the usual ten so that all the games could fit into the schedule to accommodate the playoffs, which would be shown on television. This drew criticism from some of the teams, who preferred 10 ends. The semifinals were shown on CTV Sportsnet, and the final was shown on CTV. The semis and the final were played in 10 ends.

== Teams ==
The event included the top 20 teams in the world, plus three European teams. Sweden's Peja Lindholm rink was the sponsor's exemption, after Mike Harris turned it down. Another notable missing team was Ed Werenich.

The teams were as follows:

Skip	Third	Second	Lead	Locale
Kerry Burtnyk (Note: Team not listed in source. Roster as of Feb 1999.)	Jeff Ryan	Rob Meakin	Keith Fenton	Winnipeg, Manitoba
Dale Duguid	Doran Johnson	Shane Park	Merv Bodnarchuk	Vancouver, British Columbia
Markus Eggler	Andreas Schwaller	Andreas Östreich	Damian Grichting	Biel, Switzerland
David Nedohin	Randy Ferbey (skip)	Scott Pfeifer	Carter Rycroft	Edmonton, Alberta
Doug Harcourt	Kevin Kalthoff	Greg Harcourt	Brian Wempe	Quill Lake, Saskatchewan
Jeff Hartung	Dean Klippenstine	Marty Derbowka	Bob Hartung	Langenburg, Saskatchewan
Brad Heidt	Eugene Hritzuk	Wes Cowlishaw	Dale Hannon	Kerrobert, Saskatchewan
Guy Hemmings	Pierre Charette	Guy Thibaudeau	Dale Ness	Montreal, Quebec
Russ Howard	Glenn Howard	Peter Corner	Neil Harrison	Midland, Ontario
Bruce Korte	Darrell McKee	Roger Korte	Rory Golanowski	Saskatoon, Saskatchewan
Peja Lindholm (Note: Team not listed in source. Roster as of the 1998 European Curling Championships)	Tomas Nordin	Magnus Swartling	Peter Narup	Östersund, Sweden
Kevin Martin	Don Walchuk	Rudy Ramcharan	Don Bartlett	Edmonton, Alberta
Greg McAulay	Brent Pierce	Bryan Miki	Darin Fenton	Vancouver, British Columbia
Wayne Middaugh	Graeme McCarrel	Ian Tetley	Scott Bailey	Toronto, Ontario
Rich Moffatt	Howard Rajala	Chris Fulton	Paul Madden	Ottawa, Ontario
Frank Morissette	Mickey Pendergast	Kevin Pendergast	Eugene Doherty	Calgary, Alberta
Mark Olson	Neil Patterson	Dave Leclair	Paul Kelly	Winnipeg, Manitoba
Vic Peters	Dave Smith	Chris Neufeld	Don Harvey	Winnipeg, Manitoba
Pat Ryan	Jay Peachey	Jamie Smith	Kevin MacKenzie	Kelowna, British Columbia
Brent Scales	Ken Tresoor	Doug Harrison	Grant Spicer	Swan River, Manitoba
Gerald Shymko	Gerry Adam	Arnie Geisler	Neil Cursons	Yorkton, Saskatchewan
Warwick Smith	Hammy McMillan	Ewan MacDonald	Peter Loudon	Inverness, Scotland
Don Spriggs	Dean Moxham	Dale Michie	Rick Blight	Portage la Prairie, Manitoba
Jeff Stoughton	Jon Mead	Garry Vandenberghe	Doug Armstrong	Winnipeg, Manitoba

=== Round-robin standings ===
The top two teams in each pool advanced to the playoffs.

Final round-robin standings

Key
Teams to Playoffs
Teams to Tiebreakers

M&M Meat Shops Division	W	L
(Ontario) Russ Howard	4	1
(Manitoba) Mark Olson	4	1
(Saskatchewan) Bruce Korte	3	2
(Saskatchewan) Gerald Shymko	2	3
(Alberta) Kevin Martin	2	3
(Manitoba) Don Spriggs	0	5

Molson Division	W	L
(Ontario) Wayne Middaugh	5	0
(Ontario) Rich Moffatt	3	2
(Alberta) Team Nedohin	3	2
(Saskatchewan) Doug Harcourt	2	3
(Switzerland) Markus Eggler	1	4
(Saskatchewan) Jeff Hartung	1	4

Bell Express Vu Division	W	L
(Manitoba) Jeff Stoughton	4	1
(Quebec) Guy Hemmings	3	2
(Scotland) Team McMillan	3	2
(British Columbia) Pat Ryan	3	2
(Alberta) Frank Morissette	1	4
(Manitoba) Brent Scales	1	4

Canadian Airlines Division	W	L
(Manitoba) Kerry Burtnyk	4	1
(Manitoba) Vic Peters	4	1
(Manitoba) Dale Duguid	3	2
(Saskatchewan) Brad Heidt	3	2
(Sweden) Peja Lindholm	1	4
(British Columbia) Greg McAulay	0	5

== Scores ==
Scores were as follows:

=== Draw 1 ===
- Howard 6, Spriggs 3
- Shymko 5, Martin 4
- Olson 4, Korte 2
- Moffatt 3, Hartung 2
- Duguid 5, Peters 4

=== Draw 2 ===
- Hemmings 7, Scales 3
- Eggler 5, Harcourt 4
- Middaugh 5, Nedohin 4
- Morissette 8, McMillan 5
- Stoughton 6, Ryan 3

=== Draw 3 ===
- Burtnyk 5, Heidt 4
- Lindholm 8, McAulay 7
- Shymko 6, Spriggs 5
- Martin 6, Korte 4
- Howard 7, Olson 6

=== Draw 4 ===
- Stoughton 6, Morissette 4
- Hemmings 5, Ryan 4
- McMillan 4, Scales 1
- Nedohin 6, Harcourt 4
- Middaugh 7, Hartung 1

=== Draw 5 ===
- Moffatt 5, Eggler 4
- Peters 6, Heidt 5
- Burtnyk 6, Lindholm 3
- Duguid 6, McAulay 5
- Korte 6, Spriggs 2

=== Draw 6 ===
- Olson 6, Martin 4
- Howard 4, Shymko 1
- Hemmings 7, Morissette 5
- Ryan 6, Scales 1
- McMillan 6, Stoughton 2

=== Draw 7 ===
- Harcourt 5, Hartung 2
- Middaugh 6, Moffatt 5
- Nedohin 5, Eggler 3
- Peters 6, Lindholm 4
- Burtnyk 8, McAulay 4

=== Draw 8 ===
- Heidt 9, Duguid 4
- Olson 8, Spriggs 5
- Howard 6, Martin 4
- Korte 9, Shymko 5
- Scales 6, Morissette 4

=== Draw 9 ===
- Ryan 4, McMillan 3
- Stoughton 6, Hemmings 3
- Harcourt 5, Moffatt 4
- Middaugh 8, Eggler 2
- Nedohin 7, Hartung 2

=== Draw 10 ===
- Peters 6, McAulay 4
- Burtnyk 5, Duguid 3
- Heidt 8, Lindholm 3
- Martin 8, Spriggs 3
- Olson 5, Shymko 2

=== Draw 11 ===
- Moffatt 5, Nedohin 2
- Hartung 7, Eggler 3
- Ryan 7, Morissette 6
- McMillan 6, Hemmings 1
- Middaugh 6, Harcourt 2

=== Draw 12 ===
- Korte 6, Howard 5
- Heidt 7, McAulay 5
- Stoughton 7, Scales 1
- Peters 6, Burtnyk 5
- Duguid 7, Lindholm 5

=== Tiebreakers ===
Team	1	2	3	4	5	6	7	8	Final
(British Columbia) Pat Ryan	1	0	1	0	3	0	2	X	7
(Scotland) Hammy McMillan	0	1	0	2	0	1	0	X	4

Team	1	2	3	4	5	6	7	8	Final
(Ontario) Rich Moffatt	0	1	0	0	0	1	0	1	3
(Alberta) Team Nedohin	0	0	3	0	1	0	0	0	5

Team	1	2	3	4	5	6	7	8	Final
(Quebec) Guy Hemmings	1	0	0	0	1	0	2	1	5
(British Columbia) Pat Ryan	0	1	0	0	0	2	0	0	3

== Playoffs ==
Quarterfinals
(Ontario) Wayne Middaugh	9
(Quebec) Guy Hemmings	7
(Manitoba) Jeff Stoughton	8
(Alberta) Team Nedohin	4
(Manitoba) Vic Peters	8
(Manitoba) Kerry Burtnyk	5
(Ontario) Russ Howard	8
(Manitoba) Mark Olson	7

Semifinals
(Ontario) Wayne Middaugh	10
(Manitoba) Jeff Stoughton	5
(Manitoba) Vic Peters	4
(Ontario) Russ Howard	6

Finals
(Ontario) Wayne Middaugh	9
(Ontario) Russ Howard	5

=== Semifinals ===
March 20

Team	1	2	3	4	5	6	7	8	9	10	Final
(Ontario) Russ Howard	1	0	1	2	0	0	0	0	2	X	6
(Manitoba) Vic Peters	0	2	0	0	0	1	1	0	0	X	4

Team	1	2	3	4	5	6	7	8	9	10	Final
(Ontario) Wayne Middaugh	2	0	2	0	3	0	3	X	X	X	10
(Manitoba) Jeff Stoughton	0	2	0	1	0	2	0	X	X	X	5

=== Final ===
March 21

Team	1	2	3	4	5	6	7	8	9	10	Final
(Ontario) Russ Howard	0	2	0	0	0	1	0	2	0	X	5
(Ontario) Wayne Middaugh	1	0	3	0	1	0	2	0	2	X	9
