= 2001 New Brunswick Labatt Tankard =

- Host city: Moncton, New Brunswick
- Arena: Beausejour Curling Club
- Dates: February 7–11
- Winner: Team Sullivan
- Curling club: Beaver CC, Moncton
- Skip: Jim Sullivan
- Third: Charlie Sullivan Jr.
- Second: Dan Alderman
- Lead: Jeff Lacey
- Finalist: Russ Howard

The 2001 New Brunswick Labatt Tankard, the provincial men's curling championship for New Brunswick, was held from February 7 to 11 at Beausejour Curling Club in Moncton, New Brunswick. The winning Jim Sullivan rink represented New Brunswick at the 2001 Nokia Brier in Ottawa, Ontario.

== Teams ==
The teams are listed as follows:

Skip	Vice	Second	Lead	Club
Kevin Boyle	Brent Palmer	Spencer Mawhinney	Paul Dobson	Capital WC, Fredericton
Derek Ellard	Scott Jones	Shane Longley	Darryl Langdon	Beaver CC, Moncton
Mike Flannery	Jean Guy Boudreau	Mark Gaudet	Joe Carey	Capital WC, Fredericton
Russ Howard	James Grattan	Rick Perron	Grant Odishaw	Beaver CC, Moncton
Mike Kennedy	Tim Comeau	Louis McClure	Dave Konefal	Grand Falls CC, Grand Falls
Vance LeCocq	Marc LeCocq	Jon Estabrooks	Lloyd Morrison	Beaver CC, Moncton
Shawn Mott	Jerry McCann	Nick McCann	Greg McCann	Gladstone CC, Fredericton Junction
Jim Sullivan	Charlie Sullivan Jr.	Dan Alderman	Jeff Lacey	Thistle-St. Andrews CC, Saint John

== Round robin standings ==
Final Round Robin standings

Key
Teams to Playoffs

Skip	W	L	W–L	PF	PA	EW	EL	BE	SE
Jim Sullivan	5	2	2–0	33	29	22	22	14	3
Russ Howard	5	2	1–1	45	31	29	18	5	11
Derek Ellard	5	2	0–2	40	29	29	26	8	6
Shawn Mott	3	4	2–0	29	39	23	27	11	5
Mike Kennedy	3	4	1–1	37	43	25	31	4	6
Vance LeCocq	3	4	0–2	46	37	30	28	6	8
Mike Flannery	2	5	1–0	26	37	20	22	11	5
Kevin Boyle	2	5	0–1	29	42	21	25	8	5

== Round Robin results ==
All draw times listed in Atlantic Time (UTC−04:00).

=== Draw 1 ===
Wednesday, February 7, 8:00 pm

Sheet 1	1	2	3	4	5	6	7	8	9	10	Final
Vance LeCocq 🔨	0	1	1	0	0	0	2	0	1	0	5
Shawn Mott	0	0	0	1	1	0	0	3	0	1	6

Sheet 2	1	2	3	4	5	6	7	8	9	10	Final
Kevin Boyle 🔨	0	0	1	0	0	0	1	0	X	X	2
Russ Howard	1	0	0	0	2	0	0	5	X	X	8

Sheet 3	1	2	3	4	5	6	7	8	9	10	Final
Mike Kennedy 🔨	2	0	0	1	0	2	0	0	1	X	6
Jim Sullivan	0	0	0	0	1	0	2	1	0	X	4

Sheet 4	1	2	3	4	5	6	7	8	9	10	11	Final
Derek Ellard 🔨	1	0	0	0	0	0	1	0	1	0	1	4
Mike Flannery	0	0	0	0	1	0	0	1	0	1	0	3

=== Draw 2 ===
Thursday, February 8, 9:00 am

Sheet 1	1	2	3	4	5	6	7	8	9	10	11	Final
Jim Sullivan 🔨	1	0	0	0	0	2	0	1	0	0	1	5
Derek Ellard	0	0	0	1	0	0	2	0	0	1	0	4

Sheet 2	1	2	3	4	5	6	7	8	9	10	Final
Mike Kennedy 🔨	1	0	1	0	0	0	0	2	2	X	6
Mike Flannery	0	0	0	1	0	1	0	0	0	X	2

Sheet 3	1	2	3	4	5	6	7	8	9	10	Final
Vance LeCocq 🔨	1	1	0	2	2	0	0	2	X	X	8
Kevin Boyle	0	0	1	0	0	0	1	0	X	X	2

Sheet 4	1	2	3	4	5	6	7	8	9	10	Final
Russ Howard 🔨	0	0	3	0	1	0	0	2	1	X	7
Shawn Mott	0	1	0	1	0	0	1	0	0	X	3

=== Draw 3 ===
Thursday, February 8, 2:30 pm

Sheet 1	1	2	3	4	5	6	7	8	9	10	Final
Kevin Boyle 🔨	0	3	1	0	0	2	1	0	0	1	8
Mike Kennedy	3	0	0	0	1	0	0	2	0	0	6

Sheet 2	1	2	3	4	5	6	7	8	9	10	Final
Derek Ellard 🔨	2	0	0	0	2	0	1	1	1	X	7
Shawn Mott	0	0	1	1	0	1	0	0	0	X	3

Sheet 3	1	2	3	4	5	6	7	8	9	10	Final
Mike Flannery 🔨	0	0	0	0	1	0	0	0	3	0	4
Russ Howard	0	0	0	1	0	2	0	0	0	3	6

Sheet 4	1	2	3	4	5	6	7	8	9	10	Final
Vance LeCocq 🔨	0	4	1	0	1	0	1	0	1	X	8
Jim Sullivan	0	0	0	0	0	1	0	1	0	X	2

=== Draw 4 ===
Friday, February 9, 9:00 am

Sheet 1	1	2	3	4	5	6	7	8	9	10	Final
Russ Howard 🔨	0	1	0	0	0	1	0	2	0	0	4
Jim Sullivan	0	0	0	0	3	0	3	0	1	0	7

Sheet 2	1	2	3	4	5	6	7	8	9	10	Final
Mike Flannery 🔨	3	0	0	1	0	1	0	1	0	0	6
Vance LeCocq	0	0	2	0	2	0	0	0	0	1	5

Sheet 3	1	2	3	4	5	6	7	8	9	10	11	12	Final
Shawn Mott 🔨	0	1	1	0	0	0	1	0	2	0	0	1	6
Mike Kennedy	0	0	0	1	0	0	0	2	0	2	0	0	5

Sheet 4	1	2	3	4	5	6	7	8	9	10	Final
Kevin Boyle 🔨	1	0	0	0	2	0	1	0	1	0	5
Derek Ellard	0	1	0	1	0	1	0	3	0	1	7

=== Draw 5 ===
Friday, February 9, 2:30 pm

Sheet 1	1	2	3	4	5	6	7	8	9	10	Final
Shawn Mott 🔨	0	1	0	3	2	0	1	0	0	X	7
Mike Flannery	0	0	1	0	0	1	0	1	0	X	3

Sheet 2	1	2	3	4	5	6	7	8	9	10	Final
Jim Sullivan 🔨	0	3	0	0	0	0	1	0	1	X	5
Kevin Boyle	0	0	1	0	1	0	0	1	0	X	3

Sheet 3	1	2	3	4	5	6	7	8	9	10	Final
Derek Ellard 🔨	0	0	0	3	0	0	0	0	1	0	4
Russ Howard	0	0	1	0	1	0	1	1	0	1	5

Sheet 4	1	2	3	4	5	6	7	8	9	10	11	Final
Mike Kennedy 🔨	1	0	1	0	0	0	1	0	2	2	1	8
Vance LeCocq	0	2	0	1	2	1	0	1	0	0	0	7

=== Draw 6 ===
Friday, February 9, 8:00 pm

Sheet 1	1	2	3	4	5	6	7	8	9	10	Final
Vance LeCocq 🔨	0	2	0	2	0	1	0	0	0	3	8
Russ Howard	1	0	2	0	1	0	0	1	2	0	7

Sheet 2	1	2	3	4	5	6	7	8	9	10	Final
Mike Kennedy 🔨	1	0	0	0	1	0	1	0	0	X	3
Derek Ellard	0	1	2	0	0	3	0	1	1	X	8

Sheet 3	1	2	3	4	5	6	7	8	9	10	Final
Kevin Boyle 🔨	0	0	3	2	1	0	2	X	X	X	8
Shawn Mott	0	0	0	0	0	1	0	X	X	X	1

Sheet 4	1	2	3	4	5	6	7	8	9	10	Final
Jim Sullivan 🔨	0	0	2	0	0	0	0	0	1	3	6
Mike Flannery	0	0	0	0	0	1	0	0	0	0	1

=== Draw 7 ===
Saturday, February 10, 9:00 am

Sheet 1	1	2	3	4	5	6	7	8	9	10	Final
Mike Flannery 🔨	1	0	1	2	0	1	2	X	X	X	7
Kevin Boyle	0	0	0	0	1	0	0	X	X	X	1

Sheet 2	1	2	3	4	5	6	7	8	9	10	11	Final
Shawn Mott 🔨	0	0	1	0	1	0	0	0	0	1	0	3
Jim Sullivan	0	0	0	1	0	0	1	0	1	0	1	4

Sheet 3	1	2	3	4	5	6	7	8	9	10	Final
Derek Ellard 🔨	2	1	0	0	1	0	0	1	0	1	6
Vance LeCocq	0	0	1	0	0	1	1	0	2	0	5

Sheet 4	1	2	3	4	5	6	7	8	9	10	Final
Russ Howard 🔨	2	0	2	0	1	1	1	1	X	X	8
Mike Kennedy	0	2	0	1	0	0	0	0	X	X	3

== Playoffs ==
Semifinal			Final
			1	Jim Sullivan	6
2	Russ Howard	10	2	Russ Howard	5
3	Derek Ellard	3

=== Semifinal ===
Saturday, February 10, 8:00 pm

Sheet 3	1	2	3	4	5	6	7	8	9	10	Final
Derek Ellard	0	0	1	0	2	0	0	X	X	X	3
Russ Howard 🔨	2	1	0	2	0	3	2	X	X	X	10

=== Final ===
Sunday, February 11, 2:30 pm

Sheet 3	1	2	3	4	5	6	7	8	9	10	11	Final
Jim Sullivan 🔨	1	0	0	0	0	2	2	0	0	0	1	6
Russ Howard	0	0	0	2	1	0	0	0	0	2	0	5

2001 New Brunswick Labatt Tankard

Jim Sullivan
2nd New Brunswick Provincial Championship title
