= 2005 Canadian Open of Curling =

Grand Slam of Curling event

The 2005 Canadian Open curling Grand Slam tournament was held January 27–30, 2005 at the MTS Centre in Winnipeg, Manitoba.

The final was an all-Edmonton match between Kevin Martin's rink and his rivals, the Randy Ferbey rink. Martin won the game 8–7, taking home $30,000 for his team. Team Ferbey fourth David Nedohin had a shot to win the game, but came centimetres short on his last throw, a wick-draw attempt.

Following the game, Nedohin stated "It sucks. It's brutal... It's a bad loss. (Team Martin) never deserved to win, but whatever, it happens... (Martin) thinks he's god, he always will." Nedohin was referring to their rivalry, where he believed Martin undermined their team's successes at the Brier in the early 2000s because top teams in the country like Martin had boycotted the event. In response, Martin stated "I sure don't think I am (god)... Our rivalry's great... But this game was so important for us to try and get to the (2005 Canadian Olympic Curling Trials) so really, the rivalry had to take a backseat". With the win, Martin became the first team to earn over $1,000,000 in their career.

At the box office, the event was an "unprecedented" success, with a total paid attendance of 46,808.

== Teams ==
The teams were as follows:

| Skip | Third | Second | Lead | Locale |
|---|---|---|---|---|
| Dave Boehmer | Pat Spiring | Richard Daneault | Don Harvey | Petersfield, Manitoba |
| Kerry Burtnyk | Ken Tresoor | Rob Fowler | Keith Fenton | Winnipeg, Manitoba |
| David Nedohin | Randy Ferbey (skip) | Scott Pfeifer | Marcel Rocque | Edmonton, Alberta |
| Brad Gushue | Mark Nichols | Keith Ryan | Jamie Korab | St. John's, Newfoundland and Labrador |
| Guy Hemmings | Martin Ferland | François Gagné | Dale Ness | Montreal, Quebec |
| Glenn Howard | Richard Hart | Brent Laing | Craig Savill | Midland, Ontario |
| Blake MacDonald | Jamie King (skip) | Wade Johnston | Todd Brick | Edmonton, Alberta |
| Kevin Martin | Don Walchuk | Carter Rycroft | Don Bartlett | Edmonton, Alberta |
| Jean-Michel Ménard | François Roberge | Éric Sylvain | Maxime Elmaleh | Sainte-Foy, Quebec |
| Wayne Middaugh | Graeme McCarrel | Joe Frans | Scott Bailey | Midland, Ontario |
| John Morris | Kevin Koe | Marc Kennedy | Paul Moffatt | Calgary, Alberta |
| Vic Peters | Daley Peters | Chris Neufeld | Denni Neufeld | Winnipeg, Manitoba |
| Brent Scales | Gord Hardy | Grant Spicer | Todd Trevellyan | Swan River, Manitoba |
| Jeff Stoughton | Jon Mead | Garry Vandenberghe | Steve Gould | Winnipeg, Manitoba |
| Pål Trulsen | Lars Vågberg | Flemming Davanger | Bent Ånund Ramsfjell | Oslo, Norway |

== Round robin standings ==
Final Round Robin Standings

Key
| Teams to Playoffs |
| Teams to Tiebreakers |

| Pool A | W | L |
|---|---|---|
| (Quebec) Jean-Michel Ménard | 3 | 1 |
| (Manitoba) Dave Boehmer | 2 | 2 |
| (Ontario) Wayne Middaugh | 2 | 2 |
| (Norway) Pål Trulsen | 2 | 2 |
| (Manitoba) Jeff Stoughton | 1 | 3 |

| Pool B | W | L |
|---|---|---|
| (Alberta) John Morris | 3 | 1 |
| (Manitoba) Vic Peters | 3 | 1 |
| (Alberta) Randy Ferbey | 2 | 2 |
| (Manitoba) Kerry Burtnyk | 2 | 2 |
| (Quebec) Guy Hemmings | 0 | 4 |

| Pool C | W | L |
|---|---|---|
| (Alberta) Kevin Martin | 4 | 0 |
| (Ontario) Glenn Howard | 3 | 1 |
| (Newfoundland and Labrador) Brad Gushue | 1 | 3 |
| (Alberta) Jamie King | 1 | 3 |
| (Manitoba) Brent Scales | 1 | 3 |

== Tie breakers ==
The scores for the tie breaker matches were as follows:

- (Manitoba) Burtnyk 6-5 (Manitoba) Boehmer
- (Norway) Trulsen 9-5 (Ontario) Middaugh

== Playoffs ==
The playoff bracket was as follows:

Quarterfinals
(Alberta) Kevin Martin | 8
(Norway) Pål Trulsen | 6
(Ontario) Glenn Howard | 9
(Manitoba) Vic Peters | 4
(Quebec) Jean-Michel Ménard | 2
(Alberta) Randy Ferbey | 10
(Alberta) John Morris | 10
(Manitoba) Kerry Burtnyk | 6

Semifinals
(Alberta) Kevin Martin | 7
(Ontario) Glenn Howard | 6
(Alberta) Randy Ferbey | 7
(Alberta) John Morris | 6

Final
(Alberta) Kevin Martin | 8
(Alberta) Randy Ferbey | 7

=== Final ===
| Team | 1 | 2 | 3 | 4 | 5 | 6 | 7 | 8 | 9 | 10 | Final |
|---|---|---|---|---|---|---|---|---|---|---|---|
| (Alberta) Randy Ferbey | 0 | 3 | 0 | 1 | 0 | 1 | 0 | 2 | 0 | 0 | 7 |
| (Alberta) Kevin Martin | 1 | 0 | 0 | 0 | 2 | 0 | 3 | 0 | 1 | 1 | 8 |
