= Denis Fillion =

Canadian curler (1948–2016)

- Curler ♂
- Born: June 26, 1948; Winnipeg, Manitoba
- Died: February 27, 2016 (aged 67)

Team
- Curling club: Assiniboine Memorial CC, Winnipeg, MB

Curling career
- Member Association: Manitoba
- Brier: 1: (1995)
- World Championship: 1 (1995)
Medal record
Curling
Representing Canada
World Championships
Gold medal – first place	1995 Brandon
Representing Manitoba
Tim Hortons Brier
Gold medal – first place	1995 Halifax

Denis Fillion (June 26, 1948 – February 27, 2016) was a Canadian curler from Winnipeg, Manitoba.

He was a 1995 World Men's champion and a 1995 Labatt Brier champion.

== Awards ==
- Manitoba Sports Hall of Fame: inducted in 2002 with all of 1995 Kerry Burtnyk team, Canadian and World champions

== Personal life ==
Fillion grew up in Elie, Manitoba. His family moved to Gilbert Plains, Manitoba in 1967. He was married to Trudy Murray-Thomson, and lived in Winnipeg with her and their two children. He worked for Harvey's and as a car salesman. Fillion also played hockey, and was the goaltender for the Dauphin Kings of the Manitoba Junior Hockey League in 1967. He was also an avid golfer and coached his son's provincial champion baseball team.

== Teams ==
Season	Skip	Third	Second	Lead	Alternate	Events
1994–95	Kerry Burtnyk	Jeff Ryan	Rob Meakin	Keith Fenton	Denis Fillion	Brier 1995 (gold); WCC 1995 (gold)
