= Reto Ziegler (curler) =

Swiss curler

- Curler ♂

Team
- Curling club: St Moritz CC

Curling career
- Member Association: Switzerland
- World Championship: 2 (1995, 1998)
Medal record
Curling
Swiss Men's Championship
Gold medal – first place	1995 Arlesheim
Gold medal – first place	1998 Bern

Reto Ziegler is a Swiss curler.

At the national level, he is a two-time Swiss men's champion curler (1995, 1998).

== Teams ==
Season	Skip	Third	Second	Lead	Alternate	Coach	Events
1994–95	Andreas Schwaller	Christof Schwaller	Reto Ziegler	Peter Eggenschwiler	Rolf Iseli		SMCC 1995 (gold); WCC 1995 (6th)
1996–97	Andreas Schwaller	Christof Schwaller	Reto Ziegler	Rolf Iseh			
1997–98	Andreas Schwaller	Marc Haudenschild	Reto Ziegler	Rolf Iseli	Robert Hürlimann (WCC)	Frédéric Jean (WCC)	SMCC 1998 (gold); WCC 1998 (8th)
2003–04	Andre Flotron	Robert Hürlimann	Reto Ziegler	Rolf Iseli			
