= 1995 World Men's Curling Championship =

- Host city: Brandon, Manitoba, Canada
- Arena: Keystone Centre
- Dates: April 8–16, 1995
- Winner: Canada
- Curling club: Assiniboine Memorial CC, Winnipeg, Manitoba
- Skip: Kerry Burtnyk
- Third: Jeff Ryan
- Second: Rob Meakin
- Lead: Keith Fenton
- Alternate: Denis Fillion
- Finalist: Scotland (Gordon Muirhead)

The 1995 World Men's Curling Championship (branded as 1995 Ford World Men's Curling Championship for sponsorship reasons) was held at the Keystone Centre in Brandon, Manitoba, Canada from April 8–16, 1995.

== Teams ==
| Australia | Canada | England | Germany |
|---|---|---|---|
| New South Wales CC, Victoria Skip: Hugh Millikin; Third: Stephen Johns; Second: Gerald Chick; Lead: Stephen Hewitt; Alternate: Brian Johnson | Assiniboine Memorial CC, Winnipeg Skip: Kerry Burtnyk; Third: Jeff Ryan; Second: Rob Meakin; Lead: Keith Fenton; Alternate: Denis Fillion | Wigan CC, Wigan; Haigh CC, Wigan Skip: Alistair Burns; Third: Andrew Hemming; Second: Neil Hardie; Lead: Stephen Watt; Alternate Phil Atherton | Füssen CC Skip: Andy Kapp; Third: Uli Kapp; Second: Oliver Axnick; Lead: Holger Höhne; Alternate: Michael Schäffer |
| Norway | Scotland | Sweden | Switzerland |
| Snarøen CC, Oslo Skip: Eigil Ramsfjell; Third: Anthon Grimsmo; Second: Jan Thoresen; Lead: Tore Torvbråten; Alternate: Sjur Loen | Dunkeld CC, Pitlochry Skip: Gordon Muirhead; Third: Peter Loudon; Second: Robert Kelly; Lead: Russell Keiller; Alternate: Graeme Connal | Östersunds CK Skip: Peter Lindholm; Third: Tomas Nordin; Second: Magnus Swartling; Lead: Peter Narup; Alternate: Jan-Olov Nässén | St Moritz CC Skip: Andreas Schwaller; Third: Christof Schwaller; Second: Reto Ziegler; Lead: Peter Eggenschwiler; Alternate: Rolf Iseli |
| United States | Wales | | |
| Superior CC, Wisconsin Skip: Tim Somerville; Third: Mike Schneeberger; Second: Myles Brundidge; Lead: John Gordon; Alternate: Bud Somerville | Deeside CC Skip: John Hunt; Third: Jamie Meikle; Second: Adrian Meikle; Lead: Hugh Meikle; Alternate: Chris Wells | | |

== Round-robin standings ==
Key
| Teams to playoffs |
| Teams to tiebreakers |

| Country | Skip | W | L |
|---|---|---|---|
| Canada | Kerry Burtnyk | 9 | 0 |
| Germany | Andy Kapp | 6 | 3 |
| Scotland | Gordon Muirhead | 6 | 3 |
| Norway | Eigil Ramsfjell | 4 | 5 |
| United States | Tim Somerville | 4 | 5 |
| Switzerland | Andreas Schwaller | 4 | 5 |
| Sweden | Peja Lindholm | 4 | 5 |
| Australia | Hugh Millikin | 3 | 6 |
| England | Alistair Burns | 3 | 6 |
| Wales | John Hunt | 2 | 7 |

== Round-robin results ==
=== Draw 1 ===
| Sheet A | Final |
| Scotland (Muirhead) | 4 |
| Germany (Kapp) | 5 |

| Sheet B | Final |
| Canada (Burtnyk) | 5 |
| Switzerland (Schwaller) | 2 |

| Sheet C | Final |
| Norway (Ramsfjell) | 6 |
| Australia (Millikin) | 7 |

| Sheet D | Final |
| United States (Somerville) | 5 |
| Sweden (Lindholm) | 4 |

| Sheet E | Final |
| England (Burns) | 3 |
| Wales (Hunt) | 2 |

=== Draw 2 ===
| Sheet A | Final |
| England (Burns) | 4 |
| Canada (Burtnyk) | 7 |

| Sheet B | Final |
| Australia (Millikin) | 10 |
| Wales (Hunt) | 2 |

| Sheet C | Final |
| Scotland (Muirhead) | 8 |
| United States (Somerville) | 4 |

| Sheet D | Final |
| Norway (Ramsfjell) | 7 |
| Germany (Kapp) | 4 |

| Sheet E | Final |
| Switzerland (Schwaller) | 11 |
| Sweden (Lindholm) | 6 |

=== Draw 3 ===
| Sheet A | Final |
| Sweden (Lindholm) | 5 |
| Wales (Hunt) | 6 |

| Sheet B | Final |
| Germany (Kapp) | 8 |
| United States (Somerville) | 5 |

| Sheet C | Final |
| Switzerland (Schwaller) | 8 |
| England (Burns) | 4 |

| Sheet D | Final |
| Australia (Millikin) | 4 |
| Scotland (Muirhead) | 5 |

| Sheet E | Final |
| Norway (Ramsfjell) | 2 |
| Canada (Burtnyk) | 8 |

=== Draw 4 ===
| Sheet A | Final |
| Germany (Kapp) | 4 |
| Switzerland (Schwaller) | 3 |

| Sheet B | Final |
| Norway (Ramsfjell) | 3 |
| Scotland (Muirhead) | 9 |

| Sheet C | Final |
| Canada (Burtnyk) | 8 |
| Switzerland (Schwaller) | 2 |

| Sheet D | Final |
| Sweden (Lindholm) | 5 |
| England (Burns) | 2 |

| Sheet E | Final |
| United States (Somerville) | 9 |
| Australia (Millikin) | 6 |

=== Draw 5 ===
| Sheet A | Final |
| Norway (Ramsfjell) | 8 |
| England (Burns) | 7 |

| Sheet B | Final |
| Germany (Kapp) | 4 |
| Sweden (Lindholm) | 3 |

| Sheet C | Final |
| Canada (Burtnyk) | 5 |
| United States (Somerville) | 3 |

| Sheet D | Final |
| Canada (Burtnyk) | 7 |
| United States (Somerville) | 6 |

| Sheet E | Final |
| Wales (Hunt) | 3 |
| Scotland (Muirhead) | 5 |

=== Draw 6 ===
| Sheet A | Final |
| Wales (Hunt) | 5 |
| United States (Somerville) | 10 |

| Sheet B | Final |
| Scotland (Muirhead) | 5 |
| Sweden (Lindholm) | 8 |

| Sheet C | Final |
| Australia (Millikin) | 5 |
| Canada (Burtnyk) | 10 |

| Sheet D | Final |
| Switzerland (Schwaller) | 5 |
| Norway (Ramsfjell) | 9 |

| Sheet E | Final |
| Germany (Kapp) | 6 |
| England (Burns) | 9 |

=== Draw 7 ===
| Sheet A | Final |
| Canada (Burtnyk) | 8 |
| Scotland (Muirhead) | 3 |

| Sheet B | Final |
| Wales (Hunt) | 2 |
| Germany (Kapp) | 7 |

| Sheet C | Final |
| United States (Somerville) | 7 |
| Switzerland (Schwaller) | 3 |

| Sheet D | Final |
| England (Burns) | 4 |
| Australia (Millikin) | 6 |

| Sheet E | Final |
| Sweden (Lindholm) | 10 |
| Norway (Ramsfjell) | 3 |

=== Draw 8 ===
| Sheet A | Final |
| Australia (Millikin) | 5 |
| Sweden (Lindholm) | 11 |

| Sheet B | Final |
| United States (Somerville) | 3 |
| England (Burns) | 12 |

| Sheet C | Final |
| Wales (Hunt) | 6 |
| Norway (Ramsfjell) | 5 |

| Sheet D | Final |
| Germany (Kapp) | 1 |
| Canada (Burtnyk) | 8 |

| Sheet E | Final |
| Scotland (Muirhead) | 7 |
| Switzerland (Schwaller) | 6 |

=== Draw 9 ===
| Sheet A | Final |
| United States (Somerville) | 3 |
| Norway (Ramsfjell) | 5 |

| Sheet B | Final |
| Sweden (Lindholm) | 2 |
| Canada (Burtnyk) | 8 |

| Sheet C | Final |
| England (Burns) | 5 |
| Scotland (Muirhead) | 6 |

| Sheet D | Final |
| Wales (Hunt) | 5 |
| Switzerland (Schwaller) | 6 |

| Sheet E | Final |
| Australia (Millikin) | 3 |
| Germany (Kapp) | 5 |

== Tiebreakers ==
=== Round 1 ===
| Team | Final |
| Switzerland (Schwaller) | 3 |
| United States (Somerville) | 6 |

| Team | Final |
| Norway (Ramsfjell) | 5 |
| Sweden (Lindholm) | 4 |

=== Round 2 ===
| Team | Final |
| Norway (Ramsfjell) | 1 |
| United States (Somerville) | 10 |

== Playoffs ==
=== Brackets ===
Semi-final
1 | Canada | 10
4 | United States | 7
2 | Germany | 4
3 | Scotland | 6

Final
1 | Canada | 4
3 | Scotland | 2
Bronze medal
2 | Germany | 6
4 | United States | 5

=== Final ===
| Sheet A | 1 | 2 | 3 | 4 | 5 | 6 | 7 | 8 | 9 | 10 | Final |
|---|---|---|---|---|---|---|---|---|---|---|---|
| Scotland (Muirhead) | 0 | 0 | 0 | 0 | 1 | 1 | 0 | 0 | 0 | X | 2 |
| Canada (Burtnyk) | 0 | 1 | 1 | 0 | 0 | 0 | 0 | 1 | 1 | X | 4 |

1995 Ford World Curling Championship
(Canada)
Canada
23rd title
