= 1995 Labatt Brier =

- Host city: Halifax, Nova Scotia
- Arena: Halifax Metro Centre
- Dates: March 5–12
- Winner: Manitoba
- Curling club: Assiniboine CC, Winnipeg
- Skip: Kerry Burtnyk
- Third: Jeff Ryan
- Second: Rob Meakin
- Lead: Keith Fenton
- Alternate: Denis Fillion
- Finalist: Saskatchewan (Brad Heidt)

The 1995 Labatt Brier was held from March 5 to 12 at the Metro Centre in Halifax, Nova Scotia. Kerry Burtnyk of Manitoba defeated Brad Heidt of Saskatchewan in the final.

== Teams ==
Alberta	British Columbia	Manitoba
Ottewell CC, Edmonton Skip: Kevin Martin; Third: Kevin Park; Second: James Pahl; Lead: Don Bartlett; Alternate: Jules Owchar	Kelowna CC, Kelowna Skip: Rick Folk; Third: Pat Ryan; Second: Bert Gretzinger; Lead: Gerry Richard; Alternate: Ron Steinhauer	Assiniboine CC, Winnipeg Skip: Kerry Burtnyk; Third: Jeff Ryan; Second: Rob Meakin; Lead: Keith Fenton; Alternate: Denis Fillion
New Brunswick	Newfoundland	Northern Ontario
Riverside CC, Saint John Skip: Bryan MacPherson; Third: Mark Armstrong; Second: Joseph Vautour; Lead: Brad MacPherson; Alternate: Dave Ross	St. John's CC, St. John's Skip: Bill Jenkins; Third: Joe Power; Second: Paul Harvey; Lead: Ken Peddigrew; Alternate: Gerry Collins	Fort William CC, Thunder Bay Skip: Al Hackner; Third: Rick Lang; Second: Aaron Skillen; Lead: Art Lappalainen; Alternate: Bruce Kennedy
Nova Scotia	Ontario	Prince Edward Island
Truro CC, Truro Skip: Bruce Lohnes; Third: Craig Burgess; Second: Chuck Patriquin; Lead: Dave Clarke; Alternate: Jim Burgess	Avonlea CC, Toronto Skip: Ed Werenich; Third: John Kawaja; Second: Pat Perroud; Lead: Neil Harrison; Alternate: Richard Hart	Charlottetown CC, Charlottetown Skip: Robert Campbell; Third: Peter Gallant; Second: Mark O'Rourke; Lead: Mark Butler; Alternate: David Campbell
Quebec	Saskatchewan	Yukon/Northwest Territories
CC Kénogami, Jonquière Skip: Steeve Gagnon; Third: Greg Mimeault; Second: Bernard Mimeault; Lead: Rodrigue Tremblay; Alternate: Michel Roy	Kerrobert CC, Kerrobert Skip: Brad Heidt; Third: Mark Dacey; Second: Wayne Charteris; Lead: Dan Ormsby; Alternate: Bryan Derbowka	Atlin CC, Atlin Skip: Robert Andrews; Third: Clinton Abel; Second: Alfred Feldman; Lead: Scott Odian; Alternate: Gordon Moffatt

== Map of teams ==
Provincial Winners

== Round-robin standings ==
Key
Teams to Playoffs
Teams to Tiebreaker

Province	Skip	W	L
Manitoba	Kerry Burtnyk	10	1
Saskatchewan	Brad Heidt	8	3
Alberta	Kevin Martin	7	4
Ontario	Ed Werenich	7	4
Prince Edward Island	Robert Campbell	7	4
British Columbia	Rick Folk	6	5
Northern Ontario	Al Hackner	6	5
Nova Scotia	Bruce Lohnes	5	6
Quebec	Steeve Gagnon	5	6
Newfoundland	Bill Jenkins	2	9
Yukon/Northwest Territories	Robert Andrews	2	9
New Brunswick	Bryan MacPherson	1	10

== Round-robin results ==
=== Draw 1 ===
Sheet A	1	2	3	4	5	6	7	8	9	10	Final
Ontario (Werenich) 🔨	2	0	1	1	0	1	0	1	1	X	7
Prince Edward Island (Campbell)	0	2	0	0	1	0	1	0	0	X	4

Sheet B	1	2	3	4	5	6	7	8	9	10	Final
Manitoba (Burtnyk) 🔨	2	0	1	0	1	0	1	0	0	1	6
Nova Scotia (Lohnes)	0	1	0	1	0	1	0	1	0	0	4

Sheet C	1	2	3	4	5	6	7	8	9	10	Final
Northern Ontario (Hackner) 🔨	0	1	2	0	1	0	1	0	0	2	7
New Brunswick (MacPherson)	1	0	0	2	0	2	0	1	0	0	6

Sheet D	1	2	3	4	5	6	7	8	9	10	Final
Quebec (Gagnon) 🔨	0	1	0	0	0	3	0	0	0	1	5
Saskatchewan (Heidt)	0	0	2	0	1	0	0	0	1	0	4

=== Draw 2 ===
Sheet A	1	2	3	4	5	6	7	8	9	10	Final
New Brunswick (MacPherson) 🔨	0	0	2	2	0	0	1	0	1	X	6
Manitoba (Burtnyk)	0	1	0	0	4	2	0	2	0	X	9

Sheet B	1	2	3	4	5	6	7	8	9	10	Final
Newfoundland (Jenkins) 🔨	0	0	1	0	2	0	1	0	0	X	4
British Columbia (Folk)	0	2	0	2	0	1	0	1	3	X	9

Sheet C	1	2	3	4	5	6	7	8	9	10	Final
Yukon/Northwest Territories (Andrews) 🔨	1	0	2	0	1	1	2	0	0	X	7
Alberta (Martin)	0	1	0	1	0	0	0	1	2	X	5

Sheet D	1	2	3	4	5	6	7	8	9	10	Final
Nova Scotia (Lohnes) 🔨	0	1	0	0	2	1	1	2	0	1	8
Ontario (Werenich)	0	0	2	2	0	0	0	0	2	0	6

=== Draw 3 ===
Sheet B	1	2	3	4	5	6	7	8	9	10	Final
Ontario (Werenich) 🔨	0	0	2	0	0	1	1	1	0	3	8
Yukon/Northwest Territories (Andrews)	1	2	0	0	1	0	0	0	0	0	4

Sheet C	1	2	3	4	5	6	7	8	9	10	11	Final
British Columbia (Folk) 🔨	2	0	2	0	0	0	0	1	0	0	1	6
Quebec (Gagnon)	0	2	0	1	0	0	0	0	1	1	0	5

=== Draw 4 ===
Sheet A	1	2	3	4	5	6	7	8	9	10	Final
Saskatchewan (Heidt) 🔨	0	0	0	1	0	1	1	0	2	0	5
Northern Ontario (Hackner)	0	0	0	0	2	0	0	1	0	1	4

Sheet B	1	2	3	4	5	6	7	8	9	10	Final
Alberta (Martin) 🔨	2	0	0	0	3	0	4	2	X	X	11
Newfoundland (Jenkins)	0	0	1	2	0	1	0	0	X	X	4

Sheet C	1	2	3	4	5	6	7	8	9	10	Final
Manitoba (Burtnyk) 🔨	2	0	2	2	0	0	2	0	2	X	10
Prince Edward Island (Campbell)	0	1	0	0	1	1	0	1	0	X	4

Sheet D	1	2	3	4	5	6	7	8	9	10	Final
Yukon/Northwest Territories (Andrews) 🔨	2	0	2	0	0	0	0	2	0	X	6
British Columbia (Folk)	0	5	0	1	1	1	1	0	2	X	11

=== Draw 5 ===
Sheet A	1	2	3	4	5	6	7	8	9	10	Final
Prince Edward Island (Campbell) 🔨	0	2	0	0	1	0	0	0	1	0	4
Alberta (Martin)	0	0	2	1	0	0	2	2	0	1	8

Sheet B	1	2	3	4	5	6	7	8	9	10	Final
Quebec (Gagnon) 🔨	2	0	1	1	0	3	0	0	2	X	9
New Brunswick (MacPherson)	0	1	0	0	3	0	2	1	0	X	7

Sheet C	1	2	3	4	5	6	7	8	9	10	Final
Newfoundland (Jenkins) 🔨	0	3	0	1	0	0	0	1	0	X	5
Saskatchewan (Heidt)	4	0	1	0	0	0	2	0	3	X	10

Sheet D	1	2	3	4	5	6	7	8	9	10	Final
Northern Ontario (Hackner) 🔨	1	0	3	1	1	1	0	1	X	X	8
Nova Scotia (Lohnes)	0	1	0	0	0	0	2	0	X	X	3

=== Draw 6 ===
Sheet A	1	2	3	4	5	6	7	8	9	10	Final
Newfoundland (Jenkins) 🔨	0	3	2	0	0	0	3	0	0	1	9
New Brunswick (MacPherson)	1	0	0	1	1	2	0	2	1	0	8

Sheet B	1	2	3	4	5	6	7	8	9	10	11	Final
Northern Ontario (Hackner) 🔨	2	0	1	0	0	2	0	1	0	0	1	7
Prince Edward Island (Campbell)	0	1	0	0	1	0	2	0	1	1	0	6

Sheet C	1	2	3	4	5	6	7	8	9	10	Final
Nova Scotia (Lohnes) 🔨	2	1	1	0	1	0	4	0	2	X	11
Alberta (Martin)	0	0	0	3	0	1	0	2	0	X	6

Sheet D	1	2	3	4	5	6	7	8	9	10	Final
Saskatchewan (Heidt) 🔨	1	0	0	1	1	0	1	0	1	0	5
Manitoba (Burtnyk)	0	2	1	0	0	2	0	2	0	1	8

=== Draw 7 ===
Sheet A	1	2	3	4	5	6	7	8	9	10	Final
Manitoba (Burtnyk) 🔨	1	0	1	2	2	1	0	0	0	X	7
Yukon/Northwest Territories (Andrews)	0	1	0	0	0	0	0	2	1	X	4

Sheet B	1	2	3	4	5	6	7	8	9	10	Final
Prince Edward Island (Campbell) 🔨	1	0	1	0	2	0	2	0	1	X	7
British Columbia (Folk)	0	1	0	1	0	1	0	1	0	X	4

Sheet C	1	2	3	4	5	6	7	8	9	10	Final
Quebec (Gagnon) 🔨	0	0	1	0	2	0	1	0	0	X	4
Nova Scotia (Lohnes)	0	0	0	1	0	2	0	2	3	X	8

Sheet D	1	2	3	4	5	6	7	8	9	10	Final
New Brunswick (MacPherson) 🔨	2	0	0	1	0	1	0	1	0	X	5
Ontario (Werenich)	0	1	0	0	1	0	3	0	3	X	8

=== Draw 8 ===
Sheet A	1	2	3	4	5	6	7	8	9	10	Final
Alberta (Martin) 🔨	1	0	0	0	2	0	1	1	0	X	5
Quebec (Gagnon)	0	1	0	0	0	1	0	0	2	X	4

Sheet B	1	2	3	4	5	6	7	8	9	10	Final
Yukon/Northwest Territories (Andrews) 🔨	1	0	0	1	0	0	0	0	0	X	2
Saskatchewan (Heidt)	0	0	1	0	2	0	0	2	0	X	5

Sheet C	1	2	3	4	5	6	7	8	9	10	Final
British Columbia (Folk) 🔨	2	2	0	2	1	1	0	1	X	X	9
Northern Ontario (Hackner)	0	0	2	0	0	0	2	0	X	X	4

Sheet D	1	2	3	4	5	6	7	8	9	10	Final
Ontario (Werenich) 🔨	0	0	3	0	0	3	0	2	0	2	10
Newfoundland (Jenkins)	1	1	0	1	1	0	1	0	2	0	7

=== Draw 9 ===
Sheet A	1	2	3	4	5	6	7	8	9	10	11	Final
Nova Scotia (Lohnes) 🔨	2	0	1	0	0	1	0	0	0	1	0	5
British Columbia (Folk)	0	1	0	1	0	0	2	1	0	0	1	6

Sheet B	1	2	3	4	5	6	7	8	9	10	Final
Quebec (Gagnon) 🔨	0	0	0	0	0	0	0	0	1	X	1
Prince Edward Island (Campbell)	0	0	0	1	0	1	1	0	0	X	3

Sheet C	1	2	3	4	5	6	7	8	9	10	Final
Yukon/Northwest Territories (Andrews) 🔨	0	0	3	1	0	1	1	1	0	X	7
New Brunswick (MacPherson)	1	0	0	0	2	0	0	0	1	X	4

Sheet D	1	2	3	4	5	6	7	8	9	10	11	Final
Alberta (Martin) 🔨	0	0	0	3	0	1	0	2	0	0	0	6
Northern Ontario (Hackner)	1	0	0	0	2	0	1	0	0	2	1	7

=== Draw 10 ===
Sheet A	1	2	3	4	5	6	7	8	9	10	Final
Northern Ontario (Hackner) 🔨	0	2	0	0	3	0	0	0	0	1	6
Yukon/Northwest Territories (Andrews)	0	0	1	0	0	0	1	1	1	0	4

Sheet B	1	2	3	4	5	6	7	8	9	10	Final
New Brunswick (MacPherson) 🔨	0	2	0	1	0	1	0	X	X	X	4
Alberta (Martin)	2	0	2	0	4	0	3	X	X	X	11

Sheet C	1	2	3	4	5	6	7	8	9	10	Final
Saskatchewan (Heidt) 🔨	0	1	2	1	0	3	0	X	X	X	7
Ontario (Werenich)	0	0	0	0	1	0	1	X	X	X	3

Sheet D	1	2	3	4	5	6	7	8	9	10	Final
Manitoba (Burtnyk) 🔨	2	1	0	2	0	1	1	0	2	X	9
Newfoundland (Jenkins)	0	0	2	0	2	0	0	1	0	X	5

=== Draw 11 ===
Sheet A	1	2	3	4	5	6	7	8	9	10	Final
Newfoundland (Jenkins) 🔨	0	1	0	0	2	0	0	1	0	X	4
Nova Scotia (Lohnes)	1	0	1	1	0	0	2	0	1	X	6

Sheet B	1	2	3	4	5	6	7	8	9	10	11	Final
British Columbia (Folk) 🔨	0	1	0	0	3	0	0	0	0	2	0	6
Manitoba (Burtnyk)	0	0	2	2	0	0	0	0	2	0	1	7

Sheet C	1	2	3	4	5	6	7	8	9	10	Final
Prince Edward Island (Campbell) 🔨	2	0	1	0	2	0	0	1	1	0	7
Saskatchewan (Heidt)	0	1	0	1	0	1	2	0	0	0	5

Sheet D	1	2	3	4	5	6	7	8	9	10	Final
Ontario (Werenich) 🔨	0	2	0	0	0	2	0	0	2	1	7
Quebec (Gagnon)	1	0	1	1	0	0	2	1	0	0	6

=== Draw 12 ===
Sheet A	1	2	3	4	5	6	7	8	9	10	Final
British Columbia (Folk) 🔨	1	0	0	0	1	0	1	1	0	X	4
Ontario (Werenich)	0	2	0	0	0	3	0	0	3	X	8

Sheet B	1	2	3	4	5	6	7	8	9	10	11	Final
Nova Scotia (Lohnes) 🔨	0	0	0	2	0	0	0	0	0	1	0	3
Saskatchewan (Heidt)	0	0	0	0	1	0	2	0	0	0	1	4

Sheet C	1	2	3	4	5	6	7	8	9	10	Final
Alberta (Martin) 🔨	0	2	0	1	0	2	0	1	0	1	7
Manitoba (Burtnyk)	0	0	1	0	1	0	1	0	2	0	5

Sheet D	1	2	3	4	5	6	7	8	9	10	Final
Newfoundland (Jenkins) 🔨	2	0	1	0	2	0	0	0	X	X	5
Prince Edward Island (Campbell)	0	2	0	2	0	2	1	4	X	X	11

=== Draw 13 ===
Sheet A	1	2	3	4	5	6	7	8	9	10	Final
Quebec (Gagnon) 🔨	1	0	0	0	1	1	0	0	0	1	4
Yukon/Northwest Territories (Andrews)	0	0	1	1	0	0	1	0	0	0	3

Sheet B	1	2	3	4	5	6	7	8	9	10	Final
Northern Ontario (Hackner) 🔨	2	0	0	2	1	0	2	1	X	X	8
Newfoundland (Jenkins)	0	1	0	0	0	1	0	0	X	X	2

Sheet C	1	2	3	4	5	6	7	8	9	10	Final
New Brunswick (MacPherson) 🔨	0	2	0	1	0	0	1	0	1	X	5
British Columbia (Folk)	3	0	1	0	1	2	0	0	0	X	7

Sheet D	1	2	3	4	5	6	7	8	9	10	Final
Saskatchewan (Heidt) 🔨	0	2	0	1	0	0	0	0	0	1	4
Alberta (Martin)	1	0	0	0	1	0	0	1	0	0	3

=== Draw 14 ===
Sheet A	1	2	3	4	5	6	7	8	9	10	Final
Manitoba (Burtnyk) 🔨	1	0	0	3	0	0	2	0	2	1	9
Quebec (Gagnon)	0	0	2	0	2	1	0	2	0	0	7

Sheet B	1	2	3	4	5	6	7	8	9	10	Final
Yukon/Northwest Territories (Andrews) 🔨	1	1	0	1	0	0	0	0	X	X	3
Nova Scotia (Lohnes)	0	0	2	0	1	1	2	2	X	X	8

Sheet C	1	2	3	4	5	6	7	8	9	10	Final
Ontario (Werenich) 🔨	0	4	1	0	1	0	1	1	X	X	8
Northern Ontario (Hackner)	1	0	0	1	0	1	0	0	X	X	3

Sheet D	1	2	3	4	5	6	7	8	9	10	Final
Prince Edward Island (Campbell) 🔨	1	0	0	1	0	5	1	0	X	X	8
New Brunswick (MacPherson)	0	1	0	0	2	0	0	1	X	X	4

=== Draw 15 ===
Sheet A	1	2	3	4	5	6	7	8	9	10	Final
New Brunswick (MacPherson) 🔨	0	1	0	1	0	1	0	0	1	X	4
Saskatchewan (Heidt)	0	0	2	0	1	0	1	2	0	X	6

Sheet B	1	2	3	4	5	6	7	8	9	10	Final
Ontario (Werenich) 🔨	2	0	1	0	1	0	0	X	X	X	4
Manitoba (Burtnyk)	0	1	0	2	0	5	1	X	X	X	9

Sheet C	1	2	3	4	5	6	7	8	9	10	Final
Newfoundland (Jenkins) 🔨	0	1	0	0	2	0	1	0	0	2	6
Yukon/Northwest Territories (Andrews)	1	0	0	2	0	0	0	1	1	0	5

Sheet D	1	2	3	4	5	6	7	8	9	10	Final
Northern Ontario (Hackner) 🔨	1	0	2	1	0	1	0	3	0	0	8
Quebec (Gagnon)	0	1	0	0	2	0	3	0	3	1	10

=== Draw 16 ===
Sheet A	1	2	3	4	5	6	7	8	9	10	Final
Prince Edward Island (Campbell) 🔨	1	0	1	0	0	1	0	1	0	3	7
Nova Scotia (Lohnes)	0	1	0	0	1	0	0	0	3	0	5

Sheet B	1	2	3	4	5	6	7	8	9	10	Final
Alberta (Martin) 🔨	2	0	0	1	2	0	X	X	X	X	5
Ontario (Werenich)	0	1	1	0	0	1	X	X	X	X	3

Sheet C	1	2	3	4	5	6	7	8	9	10	Final
Quebec (Gagnon) 🔨	0	2	0	2	0	1	0	2	0	4	11
Newfoundland (Jenkins)	1	0	2	0	3	0	1	0	1	0	8

Sheet D	1	2	3	4	5	6	7	8	9	10	Final
Saskatchewan (Heidt) 🔨	0	1	0	3	0	1	0	2	1	X	8
British Columbia (Folk)	2	0	1	0	1	0	1	0	0	X	5

=== Draw 17 ===
Sheet A	1	2	3	4	5	6	7	8	9	10	Final
British Columbia (Folk) 🔨	1	0	0	1	0	1	0	0	X	X	3
Alberta (Martin)	0	0	2	0	5	0	1	1	X	X	9

Sheet B	1	2	3	4	5	6	7	8	9	10	Final
Manitoba (Burtnyk) 🔨	2	0	2	1	0	3	X	X	X	X	8
Northern Ontario (Hackner)	0	1	0	0	1	0	X	X	X	X	2

Sheet C	1	2	3	4	5	6	7	8	9	10	Final
Nova Scotia (Lohnes) 🔨	1	1	0	0	0	1	0	0	0	X	3
New Brunswick (MacPherson)	0	0	1	0	1	0	1	1	3	X	7

Sheet D	1	2	3	4	5	6	7	8	9	10	Final
Yukon/Northwest Territories (Andrews) 🔨	2	0	1	0	0	0	0	0	X	X	3
Prince Edward Island (Campbell)	0	1	0	3	0	2	1	1	X	X	8

== Tiebreaker ==
Sheet A	1	2	3	4	5	6	7	8	9	10	Final
Prince Edward Island (Campbell)	1	0	1	0	0	0	1	1	0	X	4
Ontario (Werenich)	0	3	0	1	1	1	0	0	1	X	7

Player percentages
Prince Edward Island		Ontario	
Mark Butler	80%	Neil Harrison	83%
Mark O'Rourke	85%	Pat Perroud	74%
Peter Gallant	78%	John Kawaja	85%
Robert Campbell	64%	Ed Werenich	88%
Total	77%	Total	85%

== Playoffs ==
Page playoffs
1	Manitoba	5
2	Saskatchewan	6
3	Alberta	8
4	Ontario	4

Semifinal
1	Manitoba	9
3	Alberta	3

Final
2	Saskatchewan	8
1	Manitoba	10

=== 3 vs. 4 ===
Sheet B	1	2	3	4	5	6	7	8	9	10	Final
Alberta (Martin) 🔨	1	1	2	1	0	2	1	0	X	X	8
Ontario (Werenich)	0	0	0	0	2	0	0	2	X	X	4

Player percentages
Alberta		Ontario	
Don Bartlett	78%	Neil Harrison	82%
James Pahl	78%	Pat Perroud	76%
Kevin Park	90%	John Kawaja	65%
Kevin Martin	89%	Ed Werenich	39%
Total	84%	Total	66%

=== 1 vs. 2 ===
Sheet B	1	2	3	4	5	6	7	8	9	10	11	Final
Manitoba (Burtnyk) 🔨	0	1	0	0	0	1	0	0	2	1	0	5
Saskatchewan (Heidt)	1	0	1	1	0	0	0	2	0	0	1	6

Player percentages
Manitoba		Saskatchewan	
Keith Fenton	81%	Dan Ormsby	69%
Rob Meakin	82%	Wayne Charteris	90%
Jeff Ryan	78%	Mark Dacey	85%
Kerry Burtnyk	71%	Brad Heidt	74%
Total	78%	Total	80%

=== Semifinal ===
Sheet B	1	2	3	4	5	6	7	8	9	10	Final
Manitoba (Burtnyk) 🔨	1	1	3	0	2	0	2	X	X	X	9
Alberta (Martin)	0	0	0	1	0	2	0	X	X	X	3

Player percentages
Manitoba		Alberta	
Keith Fenton	56%	Don Bartlett	64%
Rob Meakin	70%	James Pahl	57%
Jeff Ryan	70%	Kevin Park	64%
Kerry Burtnyk	82%	Kevin Martin	70%
Total	70%	Total	64%

=== Final ===
Sunday, March 12

Sheet B	1	2	3	4	5	6	7	8	9	10	Final
Saskatchewan (Heidt)	0	2	0	1	0	0	3	0	2	0	8
Manitoba (Burtnyk) 🔨	1	0	2	0	2	2	0	1	0	2	10

Player percentages
Saskatchewan		Manitoba	
Dan Ormsby	75%	Keith Fenton	74%
Wayne Charteris	70%	Rob Meakin	76%
Mark Dacey	74%	Jeff Ryan	56%
Brad Heidt	61%	Kerry Burtnyk	80%
Total	70%	Total	72%

== Statistics ==
=== Top 5 player percentages ===
Round Robin only

Leads	%
(British Columbia) Gerry Richard	86
(Ontario) Neil Harrison	84
(Prince Edward Island) Mark Butler	82
(New Brunswick) Brad MacPherson	79
(Alberta) Don Bartlett	79

Seconds	%
(Saskatchewan) Wayne Charteris	87
(Manitoba) Rob Meakin	82
(British Columbia) Bert Gretzinger	82
(Prince Edward Island) Mark O'Rourke	80
(New Brunswick) Joseph Vantour	78

Thirds	%
(Prince Edward Island) Peter Gallant	81
(Manitoba) Jeff Ryan	79
(British Columbia) Pat Ryan	78
(Alberta) Kevin Park	78
(Saskatchewan) Mark Dacey	77

Skips	%
(Manitoba) Kerry Burtnyk	81
(Nova Scotia) Bruce Lohnes	80
(Alberta) Kevin Martin	80
(British Columbia) Rick Folk	76
(Saskatchewan) Brad Heidt	75

=== Team percentages ===
Round Robin only

Province	Skip	%
British Columbia	Rick Folk	80
Manitoba	Kerry Burtnyk	80
Saskatchewan	Brad Heidt	80
Prince Edward Island	Robert Campbell	79
Alberta	Kevin Martin	79
Nova Scotia	Bruce Lohnes	77
Ontario	Ed Werenich	77
Northern Ontario	Al Hackner	74
New Brunswick	Bryan MacPherson	74
Quebec	Steeve Gagnon	73
Yukon/Northwest Territories	Robert Andrews	70
Newfoundland	Bill Jenkins	70
