= Rolf Iseli (curler) =

Swiss male curler and coach

- Curler

Team
- Curling club: St Moritz CC
- Skip: Christof Schwaller
- Third: Robert Hürlimann
- Second: Christoph Kaiser
- Lead: Rolf Iseli
- Alternate: Pierre Hug

Curling career
- Member Association: Switzerland
- World Championship: 3 (1995, 1998, 2010)
- European Championship: 1 (2008)
Medal record
Men's curling
Representing Switzerland
World Senior Championships
Bronze medal – third place	2023 Gangneung
Swiss Men's Championship
Gold medal – first place	1995
Gold medal – first place	1998
Gold medal – first place	2010
Gold medal – first place	2011 Gstaad

Rolf Iseli is a Swiss curler and curling coach.

At the national level, he is a four-time Swiss men's champion curler (1995, 1998, 2010, 2011).

== Teams ==
Season	Skip	Third	Second	Lead	Alternate	Coach	Events
1994–95	Andreas Schwaller	Christof Schwaller	Reto Ziegler	Peter Eggenschwiler	Rolf Iseli		SMCC 1995 (gold); WCC 1995 (6th)
1997–98	Andreas Schwaller	Marc Haudenschild	Reto Ziegler	Rolf Iseli	Robert Hürlimann (WCC)	Frédéric Jean (WCC)	SMCC 1998 (gold); WCC 1998 (8th)
2003–04	Andre Flotron	Robert Hürlimann	Reto Ziegler	Rolf Iseli			
2004–05	Andre Flotron	Robert Hürlimann	Dominic Andres	Rolf Iseli			
2006–07	Christof Schwaller	Robert Hürlimann	Pieter-Jan Witzig	Rolf Iseli			
2007–08	Stefan Karnusian	Christof Schwaller	Robert Hürlimann	Rolf Iseli			
2008–09	Stefan Karnusian	Christof Schwaller	Robert Hürlimann	Rolf Iseli	Dominic Andres	Christoph Zysset	ECC 2008 (4th)
2009–10	Stefan Karnusian	Christof Schwaller	Robert Hürlimann	Rolf Iseli	Andreas Schwaller (WCC)	Dominic Andres	SMCC 2010 (gold); WCC 2010 (6th)
2010–11	Christof Schwaller	Marco Ramstein	Robert Hürlimann	Urs Eichhorn	Rolf Iseli, Dominic Andres	Michael Reid	SMCC 2011 (gold)

== Record as a coach of national teams ==
Year	Tournament, event	National team	Place
2003	2003 Winter Universiade	Switzerland (junior women)	4
