= 2001 Canadian Olympic Curling Trials =

Curling competition

The 2001 Canadian Olympic Curling Trials were held from December 1 to 9 at the Agridome in Regina, Saskatchewan. They were held to determine the Canadian National men's and women's Teams for the 2002 Winter Olympics.

== Men ==
=== Teams ===
Skip	Third	Second	Lead	Alternate	Locale
Kerry Burtnyk	Jeff Ryan	Rob Meakin	Keith Fenton	Andy Hick	Assiniboine Memorial CC, Winnipeg, Manitoba
Randy Ferbey	David Nedohin (4th)	Scott Pfeifer	Marcel Rocque	Dan Holowaychuk	Ottewell CC, Edmonton, Alberta
Bert Gretzinger	Bob Ursel	Mark Whittle	David Mellof	Deane Horning	Kelowna CC, Kelowna, British Columbia
Russ Howard	Glenn Howard	James Grattan	Grant Odishaw	Terry Odishaw	Beaver CC, Moncton, New Brunswick
Kevin Martin	Don Walchuk	Carter Rycroft	Don Bartlett	Ken Tralnberg	Ottewell CC, Edmonton, Alberta
Greg McAulay	Brent Pierce	Bryan Miki	Jody Sveistrup	Darin Fenton	Royal City CC, New Westminster, British Columbia
Wayne Middaugh	Graeme McCarrel	Ian Tetley	Scott Bailey	David Carruthers	St. George's G&CC, Etobicoke, Toronto, Ontario
John Morris	Joe Frans	Craig Savill	Brent Laing	Chris Fulton	KW Granite Club, Waterloo & Stayner CC, Stayner, Ontario
Kevin Park	Tony Germsheid	Ron Engel	Doug Stambaugh	Shane Park	Ottewell CC, Edmonton, Alberta
Jeff Stoughton	Jon Mead	Garry Van Den Berghe	Doug Armstrong	Jim Spencer	Charleswood CC, Winnipeg, Manitoba

=== Final standings ===
Skip	W	L
(Alberta) Kevin Martin	7	2
(Manitoba) Kerry Burtnyk	6	3
(British Columbia) Bert Gretzinger	6	3
(Alberta) Randy Ferbey	5	4
(New Brunswick) Russ Howard	5	4
(Ontario) John Morris	5	4
(Manitoba) Jeff Stoughton	5	4
(Ontario) Wayne Middaugh	2	7
(Alberta) Kevin Park	2	7
(British Columbia) Greg McAulay	2	7

== Round-robin results ==
=== Draw 1 ===
December 1, 12:30pm

Sheet A	1	2	3	4	5	6	7	8	9	10	Final
(Manitoba) Burtnyk	0	1	1	0	0	2	0	1	0	1	6
(Ontario) Morris 🔨	2	0	0	1	1	0	0	0	3	0	7

Sheet B	1	2	3	4	5	6	7	8	9	10	Final
(Alberta) Martin	1	1	1	1	0	3	0	1	X	X	8
(Alberta) Park 🔨	0	0	0	0	1	0	1	0	X	X	2

Sheet C	1	2	3	4	5	6	7	8	9	10	Final
(Manitoba) Stoughton	0	0	1	0	0	1	0	1	0	X	3
(Alberta) Ferbey 🔨	2	1	0	1	0	0	1	0	1	X	6

Sheet D	1	2	3	4	5	6	7	8	9	10	Final
(British Columbia) McAulay	0	0	2	0	2	0	2	0	X	X	6
(New Brunswick) Howard 🔨	2	1	0	4	0	1	0	4	X	X	12

Sheet E	1	2	3	4	5	6	7	8	9	10	Final
(British Columbia) Gretzinger	0	2	0	2	1	0	2	0	2	X	9
(Ontario) Middaugh 🔨	1	0	1	0	0	2	0	1	0	X	5

=== Draw 2 ===
December 2, 9:00am

Sheet A	1	2	3	4	5	6	7	8	9	10	Final
(Alberta) Martin	0	0	2	0	0	0	1	1	0	X	4
(British Columbia) Gretzinger 🔨	1	0	0	2	1	3	0	0	2	X	9

Sheet B	1	2	3	4	5	6	7	8	9	10	Final
(Ontario) Morris 🔨	1	0	0	0	1	0	0	1	0	X	3
(Alberta) Ferbey	0	1	2	1	0	2	1	0	2	X	9

Sheet C	1	2	3	4	5	6	7	8	9	10	Final
(Manitoba) Burtnyk 🔨	1	0	0	0	0	1	1	0	1	0	4
(New Brunswick) Howard	0	1	0	0	1	0	0	2	0	2	6

Sheet D	1	2	3	4	5	6	7	8	9	10	Final
(Alberta) Park	0	0	0	0	1	0	0	0	1	0	2
(Ontario) Middaugh 🔨	0	0	0	1	0	0	1	0	0	1	3

Sheet E	1	2	3	4	5	6	7	8	9	10	Final
(Manitoba) Stoughton 🔨	0	4	0	1	0	0	3	0	1	X	9
(British Columbia) McAulay	0	0	1	0	2	0	0	2	0	X	5

=== Draw 3 ===
December 2, 6:30pm

Sheet A	1	2	3	4	5	6	7	8	9	10	Final
(Manitoba) Stoughton	0	0	1	0	3	0	2	0	1	0	7
(Alberta) Park 🔨	1	1	0	1	0	3	0	1	0	1	8

Sheet B	1	2	3	4	5	6	7	8	9	10	Final
(New Brunswick) Howard 🔨	0	2	0	2	0	3	0	0	3	X	10
(Ontario) Middaugh	2	0	1	0	1	0	1	0	0	X	5

Sheet C	1	2	3	4	5	6	7	8	9	10	Final
(British Columbia) McAulay 🔨	0	0	1	0	1	0	1	X	X	X	3
(Ontario) Morris	2	1	0	3	0	1	0	X	X	X	7

Sheet D	1	2	3	4	5	6	7	8	9	10	Final
(British Columbia) Gretzinger	0	0	0	1	3	2	0	3	0	1	10
(Alberta) Ferbey 🔨	0	2	2	0	0	0	1	0	1	0	6

Sheet E	1	2	3	4	5	6	7	8	9	10	Final
(Alberta) Martin 🔨	1	0	0	1	0	0	4	0	0	X	6
(Manitoba) Burtnyk	0	2	0	0	0	1	0	0	1	X	4

=== Draw 4 ===
December 3, 1:30pm

Sheet A	1	2	3	4	5	6	7	8	9	10	Final
(Ontario) Morris 🔨	1	0	2	0	0	2	0	0	1	0	6
(New Brunswick) Howard	0	1	0	0	1	0	0	1	0	4	7

Sheet B	1	2	3	4	5	6	7	8	9	10	Final
(Manitoba) Stoughton 🔨	1	0	0	3	0	0	3	0	1	X	8
(Alberta) Martin	0	1	0	0	0	1	0	1	0	X	3

Sheet C	1	2	3	4	5	6	7	8	9	10	Final
(Alberta) Park	0	0	0	0	0	1	0	X	X	X	1
(British Columbia) Gretzinger 🔨	0	1	2	1	1	0	4	X	X	X	9

Sheet D	1	2	3	4	5	6	7	8	9	10	Final
(Manitoba) Burtnyk 🔨	2	0	2	2	0	3	X	X	X	X	9
(British Columbia) McAulay	0	1	0	0	1	0	X	X	X	X	2

Sheet E	1	2	3	4	5	6	7	8	9	10	Final
(Ontario) Middaugh 🔨	0	0	2	0	3	0	2	0	0	X	7
(Alberta) Ferbey	2	1	0	2	0	2	0	4	1	X	12

=== Draw 5 ===
December 5, 9:00am

Sheet A	1	2	3	4	5	6	7	8	9	10	Final
(Alberta) Ferbey 🔨	1	0	1	0	0	2	1	0	0	X	5
(Manitoba) Burtnyk	0	1	0	3	1	0	0	4	0	X	9

Sheet B	1	2	3	4	5	6	7	8	9	10	Final
(British Columbia) McAulay 🔨	1	0	1	0	2	0	2	0	2	X	8
(British Columbia) Gretzinger	0	1	0	1	0	0	0	1	0	X	3

Sheet C	1	2	3	4	5	6	7	8	9	10	Final
(Alberta) Martin 🔨	2	0	2	0	1	3	0	0	1	X	9
(Ontario) Middaugh	0	1	0	3	0	0	1	1	0	X	6

Sheet D	1	2	3	4	5	6	7	8	9	10	Final
(Ontario) Morris	0	1	1	0	0	2	1	0	0	X	5
(Alberta) Park 🔨	0	0	0	2	0	0	0	0	0	X	2

Sheet E	1	2	3	4	5	6	7	8	9	10	Final
(New Brunswick) Howard 🔨	1	0	2	0	2	0	1	0	0	1	7
(Manitoba) Stoughton	0	1	0	1	0	2	0	4	0	0	8

=== Draw 6 ===
December 4, 6:30pm

Sheet A	1	2	3	4	5	6	7	8	9	10	Final
(British Columbia) McAulay	0	1	0	2	0	1	0	X	X	X	4
(Ontario) Middaugh 🔨	2	0	3	0	2	0	3	X	X	X	10

Sheet B	1	2	3	4	5	6	7	8	9	10	Final
(Manitoba) Burtnyk	0	1	0	2	0	0	2	0	1	1	7
(Manitoba) Stoughton 🔨	0	0	1	0	1	0	0	2	0	0	4

Sheet C	1	2	3	4	5	6	7	8	9	10	Final
(New Brunswick) Howard 🔨	2	2	1	0	1	0	0	0	0	3	9
(Alberta) Park	0	0	0	2	0	0	1	1	1	0	5

Sheet D	1	2	3	4	5	6	7	8	9	10	Final
(Alberta) Ferbey 🔨	1	1	0	1	0	0	1	0	2	0	6
(Alberta) Martin	0	0	1	0	3	2	0	1	0	0	7

Sheet E	1	2	3	4	5	6	7	8	9	10	Final
(Ontario) Morris 🔨	0	1	0	1	0	0	0	1	1	0	4
(British Columbia) Gretzinger	1	0	1	0	1	1	1	0	0	3	8

=== Draw 7 ===
December 5, 1:30pm

Sheet A	1	2	3	4	5	6	7	8	9	10	Final
(New Brunswick) Howard	0	0	0	0	1	0	2	0	0	0	3
(Alberta) Martin 🔨	0	0	0	0	0	1	0	2	2	2	7

Sheet B	1	2	3	4	5	6	7	8	9	10	Final
(Ontario) Middaugh	1	0	0	0	2	0	0	1	0	X	4
(Ontario) Morris 🔨	0	1	1	1	0	2	1	0	2	X	8

Sheet C	1	2	3	4	5	6	7	8	9	10	Final
(Alberta) Ferbey	0	4	0	1	0	2	0	0	0	0	7
(British Columbia) McAulay 🔨	1	0	1	0	2	0	2	2	0	1	9

Sheet D	1	2	3	4	5	6	7	8	9	10	Final
(Manitoba) Stoughton	1	0	0	1	0	0	0	4	0	X	6
(British Columbia) Gretzinger 🔨	0	1	0	0	1	0	0	0	1	X	3

Sheet E	1	2	3	4	5	6	7	8	9	10	Final
(Manitoba) Burtnyk 🔨	3	0	0	0	1	0	0	2	0	1	7
(Alberta) Park	0	2	1	0	0	0	1	0	2	0	6

=== Draw 8 ===
December 6, 9:00am

Sheet A	1	2	3	4	5	6	7	8	9	10	Final
(Alberta) Park 🔨	2	0	1	0	0	2	0	2	0	0	7
(Alberta) Ferbey	0	2	0	2	1	0	1	0	0	3	9

Sheet B	1	2	3	4	5	6	7	8	9	10	Final
(British Columbia) Gretzinger	0	1	1	0	0	2	0	1	0	2	7
(New Brunswick) Howard 🔨	2	0	0	0	1	0	1	0	2	0	6

Sheet C	1	2	3	4	5	6	7	8	9	10	Final
(Ontario) Morris	1	0	0	1	1	2	0	0	1	X	6
(Manitoba) Stoughton 🔨	0	0	1	0	0	0	0	1	0	X	2

Sheet D	1	2	3	4	5	6	7	8	9	10	Final
(Ontario) Middaugh	2	0	0	0	0	0	2	0	2	0	6
(Manitoba) Burtnyk 🔨	0	2	0	1	0	1	0	2	0	1	7

Sheet E	1	2	3	4	5	6	7	8	9	10	Final
(British Columbia) McAulay 🔨	0	0	1	2	0	0	0	0	0	X	3
(Alberta) Martin	0	1	0	0	2	0	0	1	1	X	5

=== Draw 9 ===
December 6, 6:30pm

Sheet A	1	2	3	4	5	6	7	8	9	10	Final
(Ontario) Middaugh 🔨	1	0	1	0	0	0	1	0	X	X	3
(Manitoba) Stoughton	0	3	0	0	0	3	0	2	X	X	8

Sheet B	1	2	3	4	5	6	7	8	9	10	Final
(Alberta) Park 🔨	0	3	1	2	0	1	0	4	X	X	11
(British Columbia) McAulay	0	0	0	0	2	0	1	0	X	X	3

Sheet C	1	2	3	4	5	6	7	8	9	10	Final
(British Columbia) Gretzinger 🔨	0	0	0	1	1	0	2	0	2	X	6
(Manitoba) Burtnyk	0	1	2	0	0	3	0	3	0	X	9

Sheet D	1	2	3	4	5	6	7	8	9	10	Final
(Alberta) Martin 🔨	2	0	2	0	3	0	0	2	0	0	9
(Ontario) Morris	0	2	0	1	0	0	2	0	2	1	8

Sheet E	1	2	3	4	5	6	7	8	9	10	Final
(Alberta) Ferbey 🔨	2	0	1	2	0	2	0	1	0	0	8
(New Brunswick) Howard	0	1	0	0	1	0	3	0	1	1	7

== Playoffs ==
Semifinal		Final
		(Alberta) Kevin Martin	8
(Manitoba) Kerry Burtnyk	8	(Manitoba) Kerry Burtnyk	7
(British Columbia) Bert Gretzinger	6

=== Semi-final ===
December 7, 6:30pm

Sheet C	1	2	3	4	5	6	7	8	9	10	Final
(Manitoba) Kerry Burtnyk 🔨	0	2	0	2	1	0	0	2	0	1	8
(British Columbia) Bert Gretzinger	0	0	3	0	0	2	0	0	1	0	6

=== Final ===
December 9, 12:30pm

Sheet C	1	2	3	4	5	6	7	8	9	10	Final
(Alberta) Kevin Martin 🔨	1	0	1	0	0	3	0	2	0	1	8
(Manitoba) Kerry Burtnyk	0	2	0	0	1	0	2	0	2	0	7

== Women ==
=== Teams ===
Skip	Third	Second	Lead	Alternate	Locale
Sherry Anderson	Kim Hodson	Sandra Mulroney	Donna Gignac	Heather Walsh	Delisle CC, Delisle, Saskatchewan
Heather Fowlie	Carolyn Darbyshire	Bronwen Saunders	Denise Martin	Helen Radford	Calgary CC, Calgary, Alberta
Sherry Fraser	Diane McLean	Corie Beveridge	Christine Jurgenson	Marla Mallett	Richmond CC, Richmond, British Columbia
Amber Holland	Kay Montgomery	Karen Purdy	Patty Bell	Jan Betker	Caledonian CC, Regina, Saskatchewan
Colleen Jones	Kim Kelly	Mary-Anne Waye	Nancy Delahunt	Laine Peters	Mayflower CC, Halifax, Nova Scotia
Cathy King	Lawnie MacDonald	Brenda Bohmer	Kate Horne	Marcy Balderston	Ottewell CC, Edmonton, Alberta
Marie-France Larouche	Nancy Bélanger	Annie Lemay	Valérie Grenier	Karo Gagnon	CC Victoria, Sainte-Foy & CC Etchemin, Saint-Romuald, Quebec
Kelley Law	Julie Skinner	Georgina Wheatcroft	Diane Nelson	Cheryl Noble	Royal City CC, New Westminster, British Columbia
Sherry Middaugh	Janet Brown	Andrea Lawes	Sheri Cordina	Kirsten Harmark	Coldwater Rec Centre, Coldwater, Ontario
Michelle Ridgway	Lorie Kehler	Roberta Materi	Joan Stricker	Kristy Lewis	Caledonian CC, Regina, Saskatchewan

=== Final standings ===
Skip	W	L
(British Columbia) Kelley Law	7	2
(Saskatchewan) Sherry Anderson	6	3
(Nova Scotia) Colleen Jones	6	3
(Ontario) Sherry Middaugh	5	4
(Saskatchewan) Michelle Ridgway	5	4
(Alberta) Cathy King	4	5
(Alberta) Heather Fowlie	4	5
(Saskatchewan) Amber Holland	4	5
(British Columbia) Sherry Fraser	2	7
(Quebec) Marie-France Larouche	2	7

== Round-robin results ==
=== Draw 1 ===
December 1, 8:30am

Sheet A	1	2	3	4	5	6	7	8	9	10	Final
(Saskatchewan) Ridgway 🔨	1	0	0	0	2	0	1	0	0	X	4
(Nova Scotia) Jones	0	2	0	0	0	3	0	1	1	X	7

Sheet B	1	2	3	4	5	6	7	8	9	10	Final
(Quebec) Larouche 🔨	1	0	0	1	0	1	2	0	1	X	6
(Alberta) Fowlie	0	2	0	0	2	0	0	4	0	X	8

Sheet C	1	2	3	4	5	6	7	8	9	10	Final
(British Columbia) Fraser	0	1	0	2	0	2	1	0	3	X	9
(Saskatchewan) Anderson 🔨	0	0	3	0	2	0	0	1	0	X	6

Sheet D	1	2	3	4	5	6	7	8	9	10	11	Final
(Saskatchewan) Holland	0	1	0	0	2	0	0	2	0	1	0	6
(Alberta) King 🔨	1	0	1	0	0	1	1	0	2	0	4	10

Sheet E	1	2	3	4	5	6	7	8	9	10	Final
(Ontario) Middaugh 🔨	0	0	1	0	1	0	1	0	0	X	3
(British Columbia) Law	0	0	0	2	0	1	0	1	2	X	6

=== Draw 2 ===
December 1, 7:30pm

Sheet A	1	2	3	4	5	6	7	8	9	10	Final
(Quebec) Larouche	0	3	0	0	1	0	1	0	1	X	6
(Ontario) Middaugh 🔨	2	0	1	1	0	1	0	4	0	X	9

Sheet B	1	2	3	4	5	6	7	8	9	10	Final
(Nova Scotia) Jones 🔨	1	0	0	0	2	0	0	2	1	0	6
(Saskatchewan) Anderson	0	2	2	0	0	0	2	0	0	2	8

Sheet C	1	2	3	4	5	6	7	8	9	10	Final
(Saskatchewan) Ridgway 🔨	0	0	2	0	1	1	0	3	4	X	11
(Alberta) King	1	1	0	1	0	0	1	0	0	X	4

Sheet D	1	2	3	4	5	6	7	8	9	10	Final
(Alberta) Fowlie	0	0	0	1	0	1	0	2	0	0	4
(British Columbia) Law 🔨	0	0	1	0	1	0	1	0	3	2	8

Sheet E	1	2	3	4	5	6	7	8	9	10	Final
(British Columbia) Fraser 🔨	1	0	0	2	0	1	1	0	0	1	6
(Saskatchewan) Holland	0	2	1	0	2	0	0	2	0	0	7

=== Draw 3 ===
December 2, 1:30pm

Sheet A	1	2	3	4	5	6	7	8	9	10	Final
(British Columbia) Fraser	0	0	3	0	1	1	0	2	0	X	7
(Alberta) Fowlie 🔨	1	2	0	2	0	0	2	0	2	X	9

Sheet B	1	2	3	4	5	6	7	8	9	10	Final
(Alberta) King 🔨	1	0	1	0	0	2	1	0	0	0	5
(British Columbia) Law	0	2	0	1	0	0	0	1	1	2	7

Sheet C	1	2	3	4	5	6	7	8	9	10	Final
(Saskatchewan) Holland 🔨	1	0	1	1	0	1	0	2	0	0	6
(Nova Scotia) Jones	0	2	0	0	2	0	2	0	1	1	8

Sheet D	1	2	3	4	5	6	7	8	9	10	Final
(Ontario) Middaugh	0	1	0	0	2	0	0	2	0	X	5
(Saskatchewan) Anderson 🔨	2	0	1	3	0	1	1	0	1	X	9

Sheet E	1	2	3	4	5	6	7	8	9	10	11	Final
(Quebec) Larouche 🔨	1	2	0	1	0	2	0	2	0	0	0	8
(Saskatchewan) Ridgway	0	0	1	0	1	0	2	0	2	2	1	9

=== Draw 4 ===
December 3, 9:00am

Sheet A	1	2	3	4	5	6	7	8	9	10	Final
(Nova Scotia) Jones 🔨	1	0	1	2	1	0	3	X	X	X	8
(Alberta) King	0	0	0	0	0	1	0	X	X	X	1

Sheet B	1	2	3	4	5	6	7	8	9	10	Final
(British Columbia) Fraser 🔨	0	0	1	3	0	1	0	3	0	X	8
(Quebec) Larouche	0	0	0	0	2	0	2	0	1	X	5

Sheet C	1	2	3	4	5	6	7	8	9	10	Final
(Alberta) Fowlie	0	0	1	0	2	0	X	X	X	X	3
(Ontario) Middaugh 🔨	2	2	0	2	0	4	X	X	X	X	10

Sheet D	1	2	3	4	5	6	7	8	9	10	Final
(Saskatchewan) Ridgway 🔨	0	1	0	0	2	0	2	0	0	1	6
(Saskatchewan) Holland	0	0	1	1	0	1	0	1	1	0	5

Sheet E	1	2	3	4	5	6	7	8	9	10	Final
(British Columbia) Law 🔨	1	1	0	1	0	0	0	0	2	X	5
(Saskatchewan) Anderson	0	0	2	0	1	1	0	2	0	X	6

=== Draw 5 ===
December 3, 6:30pm

Sheet A	1	2	3	4	5	6	7	8	9	10	Final
(Saskatchewan) Anderson 🔨	1	0	0	0	0	0	3	0	3	X	7
(Saskatchewan) Ridgway	0	0	0	1	0	0	0	1	0	X	2

Sheet B	1	2	3	4	5	6	7	8	9	10	11	Final
(Saskatchewan) Holland 🔨	1	0	2	0	4	0	1	0	0	1	0	9
(Ontario) Middaugh	0	2	0	1	0	2	0	2	2	0	1	10

Sheet C	1	2	3	4	5	6	7	8	9	10	Final
(Quebec) Larouche 🔨	0	0	1	2	0	1	0	0	1	0	5
(British Columbia) Law	0	1	0	0	2	0	1	1	0	1	6

Sheet D	1	2	3	4	5	6	7	8	9	10	Final
(Nova Scotia) Jones	0	1	0	1	0	1	0	1	0	X	4
(Alberta) Fowlie 🔨	0	0	3	0	1	0	1	0	1	X	6

Sheet E	1	2	3	4	5	6	7	8	9	10	Final
(Alberta) King 🔨	1	0	2	2	2	0	1	X	X	X	8
(British Columbia) Fraser	0	0	0	0	0	2	0	X	X	X	2

=== Draw 6 ===
December 4, 1:30pm

Sheet A	1	2	3	4	5	6	7	8	9	10	Final
(Saskatchewan) Holland	0	3	0	0	1	2	0	2	0	1	9
(British Columbia) Law 🔨	1	0	1	2	0	0	1	0	2	0	7

Sheet B	1	2	3	4	5	6	7	8	9	10	Final
(Saskatchewan) Ridgway	0	2	1	0	3	0	1	1	0	X	8
(British Columbia) Fraser 🔨	1	0	0	2	0	1	0	0	0	X	4

Sheet C	1	2	3	4	5	6	7	8	9	10	Final
(Alberta) King 🔨	1	0	1	0	0	0	1	0	X	X	3
(Alberta) Fowlie	0	3	0	1	1	2	0	1	X	X	8

Sheet D	1	2	3	4	5	6	7	8	9	10	Final
(Saskatchewan) Anderson 🔨	1	0	1	1	0	1	1	1	0	X	6
(Quebec) Larouche	0	2	0	0	1	0	0	0	1	X	4

Sheet E	1	2	3	4	5	6	7	8	9	10	Final
(Nova Scotia) Jones 🔨	2	2	1	0	1	0	2	X	X	X	8
(Ontario) Middaugh	0	0	0	1	0	1	0	X	X	X	2

=== Draw 7 ===
December 5, 9:00am

Sheet A	1	2	3	4	5	6	7	8	9	10	Final
(Alberta) King	0	1	1	0	2	0	1	0	0	X	5
(Quebec) Larouche 🔨	1	0	0	1	0	1	0	3	3	X	9

Sheet B	1	2	3	4	5	6	7	8	9	10	Final
(British Columbia) Law	0	0	1	0	3	0	0	0	0	1	5
(Nova Scotia) Jones 🔨	1	0	0	1	0	1	0	1	0	0	4

Sheet C	1	2	3	4	5	6	7	8	9	10	Final
(Saskatchewan) Anderson	0	1	0	2	1	0	1	0	0	0	5
(Saskatchewan) Holland 🔨	2	0	2	0	0	1	0	0	0	1	6

Sheet D	1	2	3	4	5	6	7	8	9	10	Final
(British Columbia) Fraser	0	0	2	1	0	1	0	2	0	X	6
(Ontario) Middaugh 🔨	1	3	0	0	2	0	2	0	2	X	10

Sheet E	1	2	3	4	5	6	7	8	9	10	Final
(Saskatchewan) Ridgway 🔨	0	1	0	0	1	3	0	1	0	2	8
(Alberta) Fowlie	0	0	2	0	0	0	3	0	1	0	6

=== Draw 8 ===
December 5, 6:30pm

Sheet A	1	2	3	4	5	6	7	8	9	10	Final
(Alberta) Fowlie 🔨	0	0	0	0	2	0	1	0	X	X	3
(Saskatchewan) Anderson	0	0	4	0	0	1	0	4	X	X	9

Sheet B	1	2	3	4	5	6	7	8	9	10	Final
(Ontario) Middaugh	0	1	0	1	0	1	1	0	2	X	6
(Alberta) King 🔨	2	0	1	0	5	0	0	1	0	X	9

Sheet C	1	2	3	4	5	6	7	8	9	10	Final
(Nova Scotia) Jones	0	1	0	1	0	0	2	2	1	X	7
(British Columbia) Fraser 🔨	0	0	1	0	2	0	0	0	0	X	3

Sheet D	1	2	3	4	5	6	7	8	9	10	Final
(British Columbia) Law	1	0	0	0	3	0	1	0	3	1	9
(Saskatchewan) Ridgway 🔨	0	1	4	1	0	1	0	1	0	0	8

Sheet E	1	2	3	4	5	6	7	8	9	10	Final
(Saskatchewan) Holland 🔨	1	0	0	0	0	0	1	0	0	X	2
(Quebec) Larouche	0	0	1	1	0	0	0	3	1	X	6

=== Draw 9 ===
December 6, 1:30pm

Sheet A	1	2	3	4	5	6	7	8	9	10	Final
(British Columbia) Law 🔨	2	0	3	0	1	0	1	1	X	X	8
(British Columbia) Fraser	0	1	0	1	0	1	0	0	X	X	3

Sheet B	1	2	3	4	5	6	7	8	9	10	Final
(Alberta) Fowlie 🔨	2	0	1	0	0	1	0	1	0	0	5
(Saskatchewan) Holland	0	1	0	1	1	0	2	0	0	1	6

Sheet C	1	2	3	4	5	6	7	8	9	10	Final
(Ontario) Middaugh 🔨	1	0	2	0	1	0	2	1	0	X	7
(Saskatchewan) Ridgway	0	1	0	2	0	1	0	0	2	X	6

Sheet D	1	2	3	4	5	6	7	8	9	10	Final
(Quebec) Larouche 🔨	0	1	0	1	0	1	0	0	1	0	4
(Nova Scotia) Jones	0	0	1	0	1	0	1	1	0	1	5

Sheet E	1	2	3	4	5	6	7	8	9	10	Final
(Saskatchewan) Anderson 🔨	1	0	2	0	0	0	1	0	1	0	5
(Alberta) King	0	1	0	2	1	1	0	1	0	1	7

== Playoffs ==
Semifinal		Final
		(British Columbia) Kelley Law	7
(Saskatchewan) Sherry Anderson	9	(Saskatchewan) Sherry Anderson	3
(Nova Scotia) Colleen Jones	5

=== Semi-final ===
December 7, 1:30pm

Sheet C	1	2	3	4	5	6	7	8	9	10	Final
(Saskatchewan) Sherry Anderson 🔨	2	3	0	2	0	1	0	1	0	X	9
(Nova Scotia) Colleen Jones	0	0	2	0	1	0	1	0	1	X	5

=== Final ===
December 8, 12:30

Sheet B	1	2	3	4	5	6	7	8	9	10	Final
(Saskatchewan) Sherry Anderson	0	1	0	1	0	0	0	1	0	X	3
(British Columbia) Kelley Law 🔨	0	0	1	0	2	1	2	0	1	X	7

== Sources ==
- "CBC Sports Online - 2002 Winter Olympics Curling Trials". Archived from the original on November 5, 2012.
