= David Carruthers (curler) =

Canadian male curler

- Curler ♂

Team
- Curling club: St. George's G&CC, Toronto, ON

Curling career
- Member Association: Ontario
- Brier: 3 (1998, 2001, 2005)
- World Championship: 1 (1998)
Medal record
Curling
Representing Canada
World Championships
Gold medal – first place	1998 Kamloops
Representing Ontario
Tim Hortons Brier
Gold medal – first place	1998 Winnipeg
Bronze medal – third place	2001 Ottawa

David Carruthers is a Canadian curler.

He is a 1998 World Men's champion and a 1998 Labatt Brier champion.

== Teams ==
Season	Skip	Third	Second	Lead	Alternate	Coach	Events
1994–95	Ian Robertson	David Carruthers	Gary Grant	Dan Balachorek			
1996–97	Brad Mitchell	David Carruthers	Rob Kavals	Brian Cooke	Nils Cornerman		
1997–98	Wayne Middaugh	Graeme McCarrel	Ian Tetley	Scott Bailey	David Carruthers	Jim Waite (WCC)	Brier 1998 (gold); WCC 1998 (gold)
2000–01	David Carruthers	Matt Hames	A.J. Hlady	Simon Hames			
2000–01	Wayne Middaugh	Graeme McCarrel	Ian Tetley	Scott Bailey	David Carruthers		Brier 2001 (bronze)
2001–02	David Carruthers	Matt Hames	A.J. Hlady	Simon Hames			
2001–02	Wayne Middaugh	Graeme McCarrel	Ian Tetley	Scott Bailey	David Carruthers		COCT 2001 (8th)
2004–05	Wayne Middaugh	Graeme McCarrel	Joe Frans	Scott Bailey	David Carruthers		Brier 2005 (6th)

== Personal life ==
In 2012, David Carruthers worked as an icemaker at both the Brampton and Chinguacousy curling clubs in Brampton, Ontario. He was retired in November 2017.

He is married to Gail Carruthers. He resides in Brampton, Ontario.
