= 2001 Nokia Brier =

- Host city: Ottawa, Ontario
- Arena: Ottawa Civic Centre
- Dates: March 3–11
- Attendance: 154,136
- Winner: Alberta
- Curling club: Ottewell CC, Edmonton
- Skip: Randy Ferbey
- Fourth: David Nedohin
- Second: Scott Pfeifer
- Lead: Marcel Rocque
- Alternate: Dan Holowaychuk
- Coach: Brian Moore
- Finalist: Manitoba (Kerry Burtnyk)

The 2001 Nokia Brier, Canada's national men's curling championship, was held March 3–11 at the Ottawa Civic Centre in Ottawa, Ontario. It was the very first Brier to be sponsored by Nokia. The theme of the event was the 2001: A Space Odyssey. In the finals, Team Alberta, consisting of skip Randy Ferbey, fourth David Nedohin, second Scott Pfeifer and lead Marcel Rocque would capture their first of four Brier wins as a team. They edged out Team Manitoba skipped by Kerry Burtnyk in the final, 8–4. While the Brier was not unsuccessful, it did end up losing money. The total attendance was 154,136.

== Teams ==
The 2001 Brier featured the 1981 and 1995 champion Kerry Burtnyk rink of Manitoba, 1982 and 1985 champion Al Hackner rink of Northern Ontario, 1998 champion Wayne Middaugh rink of Ontario, 1988 and 1989 champion third Randy Ferbey with his new Alberta rink, 1998 and 1999 runner-up Guy Hemmings rink of Quebec, 1990 runner-up Jim Sullivan rink of New Brunswick, 1999 Mixed champion Paul Flemming, 5-time PEI champion Peter MacDonald, 4-time territories champion Steve Moss, 2-time Saskatchewan champion Doug Harcourt along with newcomers 1989 Canadian Junior champion Dean Joanisse of BC, and Keith Ryan of Newfoundland.

Alberta	British Columbia	Manitoba
Ottewell CC, Edmonton Fourth: David Nedohin; Skip: Randy Ferbey; Second: Scott Pfeifer; Lead: Marcel Rocque; Alternate: Dan Holowaychuk	Victoria CC, Victoria Skip: Dean Joanisse; Third: Jay Tuson; Second: Glen Jackson (Note: Team British Columbia alternate Chris Atchison threw second stones in Draw 16.); Lead: Randy Tervo; Alternate: Chris Atchison	Assiniboine Memorial CC, Winnipeg Skip: Kerry Burtnyk; Third: Jeff Ryan; Second: Rob Meakin; Lead: Keith Fenton; Alternate: Andy Hick
New Brunswick	Newfoundland	Northern Ontario
Thistle St. Andrews CC, Saint John Skip: Jim Sullivan; Third: Charlie Sullivan, Jr. Second: Dan Alderman; Lead: Jeff Lacey; Alternate: Peter Case	Carol CC, Labrador City Skip: Keith Ryan; Third: Garry Pinsent; Second: Mike Ryan; Lead: Dennis Langdon; Alternate: Gary Wensman	Fort William CC, Thunder Bay Skip: Al Hackner; Third: Bryan Burgess; Second: Joe Scharf; Lead: Mike Assad; Alternate: Marshall Bagdon
Nova Scotia	Ontario	Prince Edward Island
Mayflower CC, Halifax Skip: Mark Dacey; Third: Paul Flemming; Second: Blayne Iskiw; Lead: Tom Fetterly; Alternate: Mathew Harris	St. George's G&CC, Toronto Skip: Wayne Middaugh; Third: Graeme McCarrel; Second: Ian Tetley; Lead: Scott Bailey; Alternate: David Carruthers	Silver Fox C&YC, Summerside; Charlottetown CC, Charlottetown Skip: Peter MacDonald; Third: Peter Gallant; Second: Mark O'Rourke; Lead: Mark Butler; Alternate: Robert Campbell
Quebec	Saskatchewan	Northwest Territories/Yukon
CC Saint-Lambert, Saint-Lambert Skip: Guy Hemmings; Third: Don Westphal; Second: Guy Thibaudeau; Lead: Dale Ness; Alternate: Michel Ferland	Humboldt CC, Humboldt Skip: Doug Harcourt; Third: Kevin Kalthoff; Second: Greg Harcourt; Lead: Brian Wempe; Alternate: Dean Kleiter	Yellowknife CC, Yellowknife Skip: Steve Moss; Third: Darcy Moshenko; Second: Brad Chorostkowski; Lead: Jaret Moshenko; Alternate: Brian Kelln

== Map of teams ==
Provincial Winners

== Round Robin standings ==
Final Round Robin standings

Key
Teams to Playoffs

Locale	Skip	W	L	W–L	PF	PA	EW	EL	BE	SE	S%
Alberta	Randy Ferbey	9	2	1–0	73	52	53	35	8	22	85%
Ontario	Wayne Middaugh	9	2	0–1	75	43	40	32	6	12	89%
Quebec	Guy Hemmings	8	3	–	78	54	46	31	9	16	84%
Manitoba	Kerry Burtnyk	7	4	–	71	63	43	43	8	8	85%
Nova Scotia	Mark Dacey	6	5	2–0	58	63	39	44	8	9	80%
New Brunswick	Jim Sullivan	6	5	1–1	61	53	40	39	5	6	85%
Saskatchewan	Doug Harcourt	6	5	0–2	63	60	43	42	6	9	83%
Prince Edward Island	Peter MacDonald	5	6	1–0	60	69	43	46	11	5	84%
Northern Ontario	Al Hackner	5	6	0–1	55	74	39	46	5	8	79%
British Columbia	Dean Joanisse	4	7	–	55	57	39	41	17	5	84%
Newfoundland	Keith Ryan	1	10	–	48	73	35	45	11	6	79%
Northwest Territories/Yukon	Steve Moss	0	11	–	42	78	34	50	6	3	74%

== Round Robin results ==
All draw times are listed in Eastern Standard Time (UTC−5).

=== Draw 1 ===
Saturday, March 3, 1:30 pm

Sheet A	1	2	3	4	5	6	7	8	9	10	Final
Quebec (Hemmings)	0	1	3	0	0	0	2	2	X	X	8
Saskatchewan (Harcourt) 🔨	2	0	0	0	1	0	0	0	X	X	3

Sheet B	1	2	3	4	5	6	7	8	9	10	Final
Nova Scotia (Dacey)	0	0	0	1	0	2	0	1	0	0	4
Ontario (Middaugh) 🔨	1	0	0	0	1	0	1	0	0	5	8

Sheet C	1	2	3	4	5	6	7	8	9	10	Final
British Columbia (Joanisse) 🔨	0	2	0	1	0	0	0	1	0	0	4
Alberta (Ferbey)	0	0	1	0	0	0	2	0	0	2	5

Sheet D	1	2	3	4	5	6	7	8	9	10	Final
New Brunswick (Sullivan) 🔨	1	0	2	0	2	0	0	2	0	X	7
Northwest Territories/Yukon (Moss)	0	0	0	1	0	1	0	0	1	X	3

=== Draw 2 ===
Saturday, March 3, 7:00 pm

Sheet A	1	2	3	4	5	6	7	8	9	10	Final
Alberta (Ferbey) 🔨	0	0	1	1	0	0	2	1	0	X	5
New Brunswick (Sullivan)	0	0	0	0	1	0	0	0	1	X	2

Sheet B	1	2	3	4	5	6	7	8	9	10	Final
Newfoundland (Ryan)	0	0	1	0	0	1	0	3	0	0	5
Manitoba (Burtnyk) 🔨	1	2	0	0	2	0	2	0	0	0	7

Sheet C	1	2	3	4	5	6	7	8	9	10	Final
Prince Edward Island (MacDonald) 🔨	0	2	0	1	0	2	0	1	0	1	7
Northern Ontario (Hackner)	0	0	2	0	1	0	1	0	2	0	6

Sheet D	1	2	3	4	5	6	7	8	9	10	Final
Quebec (Hemmings) 🔨	1	0	0	1	0	X	X	X	X	X	2
Ontario (Middaugh)	0	3	0	0	6	X	X	X	X	X	9

=== Draw 3 ===
Sunday, March 4, 9:00 am

Sheet B	1	2	3	4	5	6	7	8	9	10	Final
Prince Edward Island (MacDonald) 🔨	3	0	0	0	1	0	1	0	2	X	7
British Columbia (Joanisse)	0	0	1	0	0	2	0	1	0	X	4

Sheet C	1	2	3	4	5	6	7	8	9	10	Final
Northwest Territories/Yukon (Moss) 🔨	0	0	1	0	0	0	0	X	X	X	1
Quebec (Hemmings)	1	3	0	3	1	1	1	X	X	X	10

=== Draw 4 ===
Sunday, March 4, 1:30 pm

Sheet A	1	2	3	4	5	6	7	8	9	10	Final
Newfoundland (Ryan) 🔨	0	1	0	0	0	1	0	0	1	0	3
Prince Edward Island (MacDonald)	0	0	0	0	0	0	2	2	0	0	4

Sheet B	1	2	3	4	5	6	7	8	9	10	Final
Northern Ontario (Hackner) 🔨	1	0	3	0	1	0	0	0	0	X	5
Alberta (Ferbey)	0	1	0	3	0	1	1	1	2	X	9

Sheet C	1	2	3	4	5	6	7	8	9	10	Final
Ontario (Middaugh) 🔨	4	0	0	0	1	0	2	1	X	X	8
Manitoba (Burtnyk)	0	0	2	0	0	1	0	0	X	X	3

Sheet D	1	2	3	4	5	6	7	8	9	10	Final
Saskatchewan (Harcourt) 🔨	1	0	0	0	1	0	0	1	0	X	3
Nova Scotia (Dacey)	0	0	2	1	0	1	1	0	0	X	5

=== Draw 5 ===
Sunday, March 4, 7:30 pm

Sheet A	1	2	3	4	5	6	7	8	9	10	Final
British Columbia (Joanisse) 🔨	0	0	1	1	0	0	2	1	0	X	5
Northwest Territories/Yukon (Moss)	0	0	0	0	1	1	0	0	1	X	3

Sheet B	1	2	3	4	5	6	7	8	9	10	Final
New Brunswick (Sullivan) 🔨	1	1	0	2	0	1	0	2	0	X	7
Saskatchewan (Harcourt)	0	0	1	0	2	0	1	0	0	X	4

Sheet C	1	2	3	4	5	6	7	8	9	10	Final
Nova Scotia (Dacey) 🔨	0	0	3	1	0	0	0	2	0	0	6
Newfoundland (Ryan)	0	0	0	0	1	1	1	0	1	1	5

Sheet D	1	2	3	4	5	6	7	8	9	10	Final
Manitoba (Burtnyk) 🔨	0	2	0	0	0	1	1	0	0	0	4
Northern Ontario (Hackner)	0	0	2	0	1	0	0	0	3	1	7

=== Draw 6 ===
Monday, March 5, 9:00 am

Sheet A	1	2	3	4	5	6	7	8	9	10	Final
Saskatchewan (Harcourt) 🔨	0	2	0	2	1	0	2	0	X	X	7
Alberta (Ferbey)	0	0	1	0	0	1	0	1	X	X	3

Sheet B	1	2	3	4	5	6	7	8	9	10	Final
Ontario (Middaugh) 🔨	0	2	0	0	2	0	1	1	X	X	6
Newfoundland (Ryan)	0	0	0	1	0	0	0	0	X	X	1

Sheet C	1	2	3	4	5	6	7	8	9	10	Final
Northern Ontario (Hackner) 🔨	1	0	1	0	1	2	0	2	0	1	8
British Columbia (Joanisse)	0	1	0	1	0	0	1	0	4	0	7

Sheet D	1	2	3	4	5	6	7	8	9	10	Final
Northwest Territories/Yukon (Moss) 🔨	1	0	1	0	2	0	1	0	0	X	5
Prince Edward Island (MacDonald)	0	2	0	3	0	1	0	0	1	X	7

=== Draw 7 ===
Monday, March 5, 1:30 pm

Sheet A	1	2	3	4	5	6	7	8	9	10	11	Final
Prince Edward Island (MacDonald) 🔨	0	1	0	0	1	0	0	1	0	2	0	5
Quebec (Hemmings)	0	0	1	0	0	0	3	0	1	0	1	6

Sheet B	1	2	3	4	5	6	7	8	9	10	Final
Manitoba (Burtnyk) 🔨	3	0	0	2	0	1	0	0	1	X	7
Northwest Territories/Yukon (Moss)	0	1	0	0	1	0	0	1	0	X	3

Sheet C	1	2	3	4	5	6	7	8	9	10	Final
Alberta (Ferbey) 🔨	1	1	0	0	1	1	0	3	1	1	9
Ontario (Middaugh)	0	0	2	2	0	0	2	0	0	0	6

Sheet D	1	2	3	4	5	6	7	8	9	10	Final
Nova Scotia (Dacey) 🔨	2	0	2	2	0	2	0	1	0	X	9
New Brunswick (Sullivan)	0	2	0	0	1	0	2	0	0	X	5

=== Draw 8 ===
Monday, March 5, 7:30 pm

Sheet A	1	2	3	4	5	6	7	8	9	10	Final
New Brunswick (Sullivan) 🔨	0	2	0	5	0	4	X	X	X	X	11
Northern Ontario (Hackner)	1	0	1	0	1	0	X	X	X	X	3

Sheet B	1	2	3	4	5	6	7	8	9	10	Final
British Columbia (Joanisse) 🔨	0	1	0	1	0	0	1	0	0	X	3
Nova Scotia (Dacey)	0	0	1	0	1	0	0	2	3	X	7

Sheet C	1	2	3	4	5	6	7	8	9	10	Final
Quebec (Hemmings) 🔨	0	2	0	2	0	3	0	1	0	X	8
Manitoba (Burtnyk)	0	0	3	0	5	0	2	0	2	X	12

Sheet D	1	2	3	4	5	6	7	8	9	10	Final
Newfoundland (Ryan) 🔨	2	0	0	0	1	0	1	0	1	0	5
Saskatchewan (Harcourt)	0	1	0	0	0	3	0	2	0	1	7

=== Draw 9 ===
Tuesday, March 6, 9:00 am

Sheet A	1	2	3	4	5	6	7	8	9	10	Final
Quebec (Hemmings) 🔨	4	0	1	1	0	2	X	X	X	X	8
Nova Scotia (Dacey)	0	1	0	0	1	0	X	X	X	X	2

Sheet B	1	2	3	4	5	6	7	8	9	10	11	Final
Northwest Territories/Yukon (Moss) 🔨	1	0	0	0	1	0	2	0	1	0	0	5
Northern Ontario (Hackner)	0	0	1	0	0	1	0	2	0	1	1	6

Sheet C	1	2	3	4	5	6	7	8	9	10	Final
Ontario (Middaugh) 🔨	1	0	1	0	1	0	0	2	0	X	5
Saskatchewan (Harcourt)	0	2	0	1	0	2	2	0	2	X	9

Sheet D	1	2	3	4	5	6	7	8	9	10	Final
New Brunswick (Sullivan) 🔨	1	0	1	0	1	0	1	0	1	0	5
Manitoba (Burtnyk)	0	1	0	1	0	2	0	2	0	1	7

=== Draw 10 ===
Tuesday, March 6, 1:30 pm

Sheet A	1	2	3	4	5	6	7	8	9	10	Final
Northern Ontario (Hackner) 🔨	2	0	0	2	0	3	0	0	0	X	7
Newfoundland (Ryan)	0	0	1	0	1	0	2	1	0	X	5

Sheet B	1	2	3	4	5	6	7	8	9	10	Final
Nova Scotia (Dacey) 🔨	2	0	0	1	0	0	0	X	X	X	3
Alberta (Ferbey)	0	2	1	0	1	2	2	X	X	X	8

Sheet C	1	2	3	4	5	6	7	8	9	10	Final
Manitoba (Burtnyk) 🔨	2	0	1	0	2	0	2	0	1	X	8
Prince Edward Island (MacDonald)	0	1	0	1	0	1	0	1	0	X	4

Sheet D	1	2	3	4	5	6	7	8	9	10	Final
Saskatchewan (Harcourt) 🔨	1	0	0	2	0	0	1	0	0	1	5
British Columbia (Joanisse)	0	1	1	0	0	1	0	1	0	0	4

=== Draw 11 ===
Tuesday, March 6, 7:30 pm

Sheet A	1	2	3	4	5	6	7	8	9	10	Final
Alberta (Ferbey) 🔨	0	1	1	1	0	0	1	0	0	2	6
Northwest Territories/Yukon (Moss)	0	0	0	0	1	1	0	2	0	0	4

Sheet B	1	2	3	4	5	6	7	8	9	10	Final
Newfoundland (Ryan) 🔨	0	1	0	0	2	0	0	1	0	X	4
Quebec (Hemmings)	2	0	2	1	0	1	1	0	1	X	8

Sheet C	1	2	3	4	5	6	7	8	9	10	11	Final
British Columbia (Joanisse) 🔨	0	1	0	0	0	0	0	0	0	1	0	2
New Brunswick (Sullivan)	0	0	1	0	0	1	0	0	0	0	1	3

Sheet D	1	2	3	4	5	6	7	8	9	10	Final
Prince Edward Island (MacDonald) 🔨	1	0	0	0	0	1	1	1	0	X	4
Ontario (Middaugh)	0	0	3	1	2	0	0	0	2	X	8

=== Draw 12 ===
Wednesday, March 7, 9:00 am

Sheet A	1	2	3	4	5	6	7	8	9	10	Final
Ontario (Middaugh) 🔨	1	0	3	0	0	0	2	0	2	X	8
New Brunswick (Sullivan)	0	2	0	0	0	2	0	1	0	X	5

Sheet B	1	2	3	4	5	6	7	8	9	10	Final
Saskatchewan (Harcourt) 🔨	1	0	1	0	0	1	0	0	2	X	5
Manitoba (Burtnyk)	0	0	0	3	2	0	2	0	0	X	7

Sheet C	1	2	3	4	5	6	7	8	9	10	Final
Nova Scotia (Dacey) 🔨	2	0	0	1	1	0	1	0	2	X	7
Northern Ontario (Hackner)	0	0	1	0	0	1	0	2	0	X	4

Sheet D	1	2	3	4	5	6	7	8	9	10	Final
Alberta (Ferbey) 🔨	0	1	1	0	2	2	1	1	X	X	8
Newfoundland (Ryan)	1	0	0	1	0	0	0	0	X	X	2

=== Draw 13 ===
Wednesday, March 7, 1:30 pm

Sheet A	1	2	3	4	5	6	7	8	9	10	11	Final
Manitoba (Burtnyk) 🔨	1	0	1	0	1	0	0	2	0	1	0	6
British Columbia (Joanisse)	0	1	0	1	0	0	3	0	1	0	1	7

Sheet B	1	2	3	4	5	6	7	8	9	10	Final
New Brunswick (Sullivan) 🔨	0	2	0	1	0	1	0	0	3	X	7
Prince Edward Island (MacDonald)	0	0	1	0	1	0	0	1	0	X	3

Sheet C	1	2	3	4	5	6	7	8	9	10	Final
Newfoundland (Ryan) 🔨	3	0	2	0	3	0	2	0	X	X	10
Northwest Territories/Yukon (Moss)	0	2	0	2	0	1	0	1	X	X	6

Sheet D	1	2	3	4	5	6	7	8	9	10	Final
Northern Ontario (Hackner) 🔨	0	0	1	0	0	1	0	X	X	X	2
Quebec (Hemmings)	2	1	0	0	3	0	3	X	X	X	9

=== Draw 14 ===
Wednesday, March 7, 7:30 pm

Sheet A	1	2	3	4	5	6	7	8	9	10	Final
Prince Edward Island (MacDonald) 🔨	0	0	2	0	1	0	2	0	0	X	5
Saskatchewan (Harcourt)	0	1	0	1	0	3	0	1	3	X	9

Sheet B	1	2	3	4	5	6	7	8	9	10	Final
British Columbia (Joanisse) 🔨	1	0	0	0	0	0	0	0	2	0	3
Ontario (Middaugh)	0	0	0	2	1	0	0	0	0	1	4

Sheet C	1	2	3	4	5	6	7	8	9	10	Final
Quebec (Hemmings) 🔨	0	1	0	1	4	0	1	0	2	X	9
Alberta (Ferbey)	0	0	2	0	0	2	0	1	0	X	5

Sheet D	1	2	3	4	5	6	7	8	9	10	Final
Northwest Territories/Yukon (Moss) 🔨	1	1	0	0	1	0	0	2	0	0	5
Nova Scotia (Dacey)	0	0	1	1	0	1	0	0	2	1	6

=== Draw 15 ===
Thursday, March 8, 9:00 am

Sheet A	1	2	3	4	5	6	7	8	9	10	Final
Nova Scotia (Dacey) 🔨	0	2	0	0	2	0	0	0	0	X	4
Manitoba (Burtnyk)	1	0	1	2	0	2	0	1	0	X	7

Sheet B	1	2	3	4	5	6	7	8	9	10	11	Final
Alberta (Ferbey) 🔨	1	0	1	0	1	0	1	0	3	0	1	8
Prince Edward Island (MacDonald)	0	1	0	2	0	2	0	1	0	1	0	7

Sheet C	1	2	3	4	5	6	7	8	9	10	Final
New Brunswick (Sullivan) 🔨	2	0	0	1	1	0	1	0	0	1	6
Newfoundland (Ryan)	0	0	1	0	0	2	0	0	1	0	4

Sheet D	1	2	3	4	5	6	7	8	9	10	Final
British Columbia (Joanisse) 🔨	1	0	3	1	0	1	0	2	0	X	8
Quebec (Hemmings)	0	2	0	0	1	0	2	0	0	X	5

=== Draw 16 ===
Thursday, March 8, 1:30 pm

Sheet A	1	2	3	4	5	6	7	8	9	10	Final
Newfoundland (Ryan) 🔨	0	0	1	0	2	0	1	0	0	0	4
British Columbia (Joanisse)	0	0	0	1	0	2	0	2	0	3	8

Sheet B	1	2	3	4	5	6	7	8	9	10	Final
Quebec (Hemmings) 🔨	0	0	1	0	0	0	2	1	1	X	5
New Brunswick (Sullivan)	0	0	0	1	1	1	0	0	0	X	3

Sheet C	1	2	3	4	5	6	7	8	9	10	Final
Saskatchewan (Harcourt) 🔨	0	2	0	2	1	1	0	1	0	X	7
Northwest Territories/Yukon (Moss)	0	0	1	0	0	0	2	0	2	X	5

Sheet D	1	2	3	4	5	6	7	8	9	10	Final
Ontario (Middaugh) 🔨	1	2	1	2	0	0	X	X	X	X	6
Northern Ontario (Hackner)	0	0	0	0	0	1	X	X	X	X	1

=== Draw 17 ===
Thursday, March 8, 7:30 pm

Sheet A	1	2	3	4	5	6	7	8	9	10	Final
Northwest Territories/Yukon (Moss) 🔨	1	0	0	0	1	0	0	0	X	X	2
Ontario (Middaugh)	0	3	0	1	0	2	0	1	X	X	7

Sheet B	1	2	3	4	5	6	7	8	9	10	Final
Northern Ontario (Hackner) 🔨	1	1	0	1	2	1	0	0	0	X	6
Saskatchewan (Harcourt)	0	0	1	0	0	0	1	1	1	X	4

Sheet C	1	2	3	4	5	6	7	8	9	10	Final
Prince Edward Island (MacDonald) 🔨	1	1	0	3	0	0	1	1	0	X	7
Nova Scotia (Dacey)	0	0	1	0	2	1	0	0	1	X	5

Sheet D	1	2	3	4	5	6	7	8	9	10	Final
Manitoba (Burtnyk) 🔨	0	0	0	1	1	1	0	0	0	X	3
Alberta (Ferbey)	1	1	1	0	0	0	3	1	0	X	7

== Playoffs ==
Page playoffs
1	Alberta	8
2	Ontario	6
3	Quebec	7
4	Manitoba	9

Semifinal
2	Ontario	5
4	Manitoba	6

Final
1	Alberta	8
4	Manitoba	4

=== 1 vs. 2 ===
Friday, March 9, 7:30 pm

Sheet B	1	2	3	4	5	6	7	8	9	10	Final
Alberta (Ferbey) 🔨	1	0	1	0	3	0	1	0	0	2	8
Ontario (Middaugh)	0	1	0	2	0	2	0	1	0	0	6

=== 3 vs. 4 ===
Friday, March 9, 1:30 pm

Sheet B	1	2	3	4	5	6	7	8	9	10	Final
Quebec (Hemmings) 🔨	2	0	0	0	2	0	1	0	2	X	7
Manitoba (Burtnyk)	0	2	1	1	0	3	0	2	0	X	9

=== Semifinal ===
Saturday, March 10, 1:30 pm

Sheet B	1	2	3	4	5	6	7	8	9	10	Final
Manitoba (Burtnyk)	0	2	1	1	0	0	1	0	0	1	6
Ontario (Middaugh) 🔨	1	0	0	0	2	0	0	1	1	0	5

=== Final ===
Sunday, March 11, 1:30 pm

Sheet B	1	2	3	4	5	6	7	8	9	10	Final
Alberta (Ferbey) 🔨	1	0	0	1	0	2	0	2	2	X	8
Manitoba (Burtnyk)	0	1	1	0	1	0	1	0	0	X	4

== Statistics ==
=== Top 5 player percentages ===
Round robin only

Key
First All-Star Team
Second All-Star Team

Leads	%
(Quebec) Dale Ness	91
(New Brunswick) Jeff Lacey	90
(Ontario) Scott Bailey	90
(Alberta) Marcel Rocque	88
(Manitoba) Keith Fenton	87

Seconds	%
(Ontario) Ian Tetley	91
(Alberta) Scott Pfeifer	87
(Prince Edward Island) Mark O'Rourke	87
(Manitoba) Rob Meakin	86
(Saskatchewan) Greg Harcourt	86

Thirds	%
(Ontario) Graeme McCarrel	88
(New Brunswick) Charlie Sullivan Jr.	85
(British Columbia) Jay Tuson	83
(Manitoba) Jeff Ryan	83
(Quebec) Don Westphal	83

Skips	%
(Ontario) Wayne Middaugh	88
(Manitoba) Kerry Burtnyk	83
(Saskatchewan) Doug Harcourt	82
(British Columbia) Dean Joanisse	82
(Quebec) Guy Hemmings	82

=== Perfect games ===
Round robin only; minimum 10 shots thrown

Player	Team	Position	Shots	Opponent
Wayne Middaugh (1)	Ontario	Skip	10	Quebec
Ian Tetley	Ontario	Second	16	Manitoba
Wayne Middaugh (2)	Ontario	Skip	16	Manitoba

== Awards ==
=== All-Star teams ===
The All-Star Teams were as follows:

First Team
Position	Name	Team
Skip	Wayne Middaugh (5)	Ontario
Third	Graeme McCarrel (2)	Ontario
Second	Ian Tetley (3)	Ontario
Lead	Dale Ness (2)	Quebec

Second Team
Position	Name	Team
Skip	Kerry Burtnyk	Manitoba
Third	Charlie Sullivan Jr. (2)	New Brunswick
Second	Scott Pfeifer	Alberta
Lead	Scott Bailey	Ontario

=== Ross Harstone Sportsmanship Award ===
The Ross Harstone Sportsmanship Award is presented to the player chosen by their fellow peers as the curler who best represented Harstone's high ideals of good sportsmanship, observance of the rules, exemplary conduct and curling ability.

Name	Position	Team
Paul Flemming	Third	Nova Scotia

=== Hec Gervais Most Valuable Player Award ===
The Hec Gervais Most Valuable Player Award was awarded to the top player in the playoff round by members of the media.

Name	Position	Team
David Nedohin	Fourth	Alberta

== Playdowns ==
- Alberta: Team Nedohin, skipped by Randy Ferbey won the Alberta Safeway Select, defeating Kevin Martin 6–4 in the final at the Stettler Recreation Centre in Stettler on February 11.
- British Columbia: Dean Joanisse of Victoria won the Safeway Select B.C. men's curling championship, defeating defending Brier champion Greg McAulay of New Westminster, 5–4 in the final at the McArthur Island Sports Centre in Kamloops on February 11.
- Manitoba: Kerry Burtnyk (Assiniboine Memorial) won the Manitoba Safeway Select 10–7 over Dale Duguid (Granite) in the final at the Selkirk Recreation Complex in Selkirk on February 11. Duguid's last draw in the 10th came up short after picking on a piece of straw, giving the victory to Burtnyk.
- New Brunswick: Jim Sullivan of Saint John defeated Russ Howard of Moncton 6–5 in an extra end in the final of the 2001 New Brunswick Labatt Tankard played in Moncton.
- Newfoundland: Keith Ryan of Labrador City beat Ken Peddigrew of St. John's in the Newfoundland championship final, 5–4 in Stephenville.
- Northern Ontario: In an all-Thunder Bay final, the Al Hackner rink beat Team Bill Adams (skipped by Scott Henderson) 6–5 in an extra end at the Northern Ontario Labatt Tankard played at the North Bay Granite Club in North Bay on February 11. Hackner made a draw to the button for the win.
- Nova Scotia: Paul Flemming defeated Ken Myers (both of Halifax) 9–7 in final of the Nova Scotia championship played in Sydney.
- Ontario: Wayne Middaugh beat Stayner's John Morris, 4–3 in the final of the 2001 Ontario Nokia Cup played February 11 in Woodstock.
- Prince Edward Island: Peter MacDonald of Charlottetown won the Prince Edward Island Tankard on February 5.
- Quebec: Guy Hemmings downed François Roberge of Quebec City 7–2 in the Quebec final, played on February 10 in Chicoutimi.
- Saskatchewan Quill Lake's Doug Harcourt went 22–0 through playdown play, culminating in a 5–2 victory over Rocansville's Daryl Williamson in the final of the Pool Tankard played in Kindersley February 11.
- Northwest Territories/Yukon: Steve Moss of the Northwest Territories won the Yukon/NWT Men's Curling Championship played at the Mt. McIntyre Recreation Centre in Whitehorse, Yukon over the January 27–28 weekend. He posted a 5–1 record, two wins more than second place Jon Solberg of the Yukon.

== Sources ==
- CBC sports - 2001 Brier
- Soudog's curling history site - 2001 Brier
- Canadian Curling Association - 2001 Brier statistical summary
- Curlingzone.com - 2001 Nokia Brier
