= Peter Eggenschwiler =

Swiss curler

- Curler ♂

Team
- Curling club: St Moritz CC

Curling career
- Member Association: Switzerland
- World Championship: 1 (1995)
Medal record
Curling
Swiss Men's Championship
Gold medal – first place	1995 Arlesheim

Peter Eggenschwiler is a Swiss curler.

At the national level, he is a 1995 Swiss men's champion curler.

== Teams ==
Season	Skip	Third	Second	Lead	Alternate	Events
1994–95	Andreas Schwaller	Christof Schwaller	Reto Ziegler	Peter Eggenschwiler	Rolf Iseli	SMCC 1995 (gold); WCC 1995 (6th)
