= Jeff Ryan (curler) =

Canadian male curler

- Curler ♂

Team
- Curling club: Assiniboine Memorial CC, Winnipeg, MB

Curling career
- Member Association: Manitoba
- Brier: 3: (1988, 1995, 2001)
- World Championship: 1 (1995)
Medal record
Curling
Representing Canada
World Championships
Gold medal – first place	1995 Brandon
Representing Manitoba
The Brier
Gold medal – first place	1995 Halifax
Silver medal – second place	2001 Ottawa
Canadian Olympic Curling Trials
Silver medal – second place	2001 Regina

Jeffrey Ryan is a Canadian curler.

He is a 1995 World Men's champion and a 1995 Labatt Brier champion.

== Awards ==
- Manitoba Sports Hall of Fame: inducted in 2002 with all of 1995 Kerry Burtnyk team, Canadian and World champions

== Teams ==
Season	Skip	Third	Second	Lead	Alternate	Events
1987–88	Kerry Burtnyk	Jim Spencer	Ron Kammerlock	Don Harvey	Jeff Ryan	Brier 1988 (4th)
1993–94	Jeff Ryan	Dave Iverson	Keith Fenton	Terry Henry		
1994–95	Jeff Stoughton	Jeff Ryan	Garry Vandenberghe	Darryl Gunnlaugson		
1994–95	Kerry Burtnyk	Jeff Ryan	Rob Meakin	Keith Fenton	Denis Fillion	Brier 1995 (gold); WCC 1995 (gold)
1996–97	Kerry Burtnyk	Jeff Ryan	Rob Meakin	Keith Fenton		
1997–98	Kerry Burtnyk	Jeff Ryan	Rob Meakin	Keith Fenton	Scott Grant	COCT 1997 (4th)
1999–00	Kerry Burtnyk	Jeff Ryan	Rob Meakin	Keith Fenton		
2000–01	Kerry Burtnyk	Jeff Ryan	Rob Meakin	Keith Fenton	Andy Hick	Brier 2001 (silver)
2001–02	Kerry Burtnyk	Jeff Ryan	Rob Meakin	Keith Fenton	Andy Hick	COCT 2001 (silver)
2001–02	Kerry Burtnyk	Jeff Ryan	Rob Fowler	Keith Fenton		
2002–03	Kerry Burtnyk	Jeff Ryan	Rob Fowler	Keith Fenton		

== Personal life ==
Jeff Ryan is from family of curlers: his brother is Pat Ryan, a three-time Brier winner and two-time world champion; his daughter Hailey played third for Manitoba on 2017 Canadian Juniors and on 2019 Manitoba Scotties; his son JT skipped a team at the 2017 and 2018 provincial championships as well as the 2017, 2018 and 2019 Canadian Juniors.
