= Charlie Sullivan (curler) =

Canadian curler (born 1968)

Charles Sullivan, Jr.
- Curler
- Born: April 30, 1968 (age 58); Saint John, New Brunswick, Canada

Team
- Curling club: Thistle-St. Andrews CC, Saint John, NB
- Mixed doubles partner: Leah Thompson

Curling career
- Brier: 5 (1990, 1994, 1997, 2001, 2011)
Medal record
Men's curling
Representing Canada
World Junior Championships
Gold medal – first place	1988 Füssen
Representing New Brunswick
Tim Hortons Brier
Silver medal – second place	1990 Sault Ste. Marie
Bronze medal – third place	1997 Calgary

Charles A. Sullivan Jr. (born April 30, 1968) is a Canadian curler from Saint John, New Brunswick. He is a former World Junior curling champion.

== Career ==
In 1987, playing third for his cousin Jim's rink out of Fredericton, New Brunswick, Sullivan won the New Brunswick junior provincial title earning him a right to represent New Brunswick at the 1987 Canadian Junior Curling Championships. At the Canadian Juniors, the New Brunswick team defeated Ontario's Wayne Middaugh 8–6.. This qualified them to represent Canada at the 1988 World Junior Curling Championships, which they won. They beat Sweden's Peja Lindholm rink 4–2 in the final. The Jim Sullivan Rink was inducted into the NB Sports Hall of Fame in 1994. They were also inducted into the Fredericton sports Wall of Fame in 1992 and the NB Curling Hall of Fame in 2022. Charlie Jr was inducted into the Saint John Sports Hall of Fame in 2023.

In 1990, the team won their first provincial men's championship. At the 1990 Labatt Brier the team went 6–5 in the round robin, but won a tie-breaker and the semi-final before losing to Ontario's Ed Werenich in the final. In 1994, Sullivan won his second provincial title, this time playing third for Brian Dobson. At the 1994 Labatt Brier, New Brunswick finished 5–6, out of the playoffs. In 1997, Sullivan won his third provincial title, this time playing third for James Grattan. After finishing the round robin with an 8–3 record, they defeated Werenich in the 3 vs. 4 game, but lost to Manitoba's Vic Peters in an extra-end semi-final. In 2001, Sullivan won his fourth provincial title. This time, playing with Jim, the team finished with a 6–5 record at the 2001 Nokia Brier.

In 2010, Sullivan re-joined the James Grattan rink and won his fifth provincial title in 2011. He coached teams skipped by Sandy Comeau (2005 & 2007), Andrea Crawford (2013, 2014, 2019), Sylvie Robichaud (2016) at the Scotties. He coached teams at the Canadian Junior Championship in 1989, 1992, 1996, 2022 and coached NBIAA high school mixed champions in 95, 96, & 98. He attended the Canadian Mixed Curling Championship in 1990 (6–5), 2004 (6–5), 2011 (tie breaker), 2016 (Semi-finalist), 2017 (6–4), 2018 (semi-finalist), 2023 (Play-off round), 2024 (TBD). He has also won four New Brunswick Mixed Doubles titles with Leah Thompson (2017, 2019, 2021, 2023). Sullivan has coached Saint John High School's swim team since 1991, and has led them to claim 38 New Brunswick Interscholastic Athletic Association swimming championship banners.

== Personal life ==
Sullivan has six children and works as a teacher with the Anglophone School District South. His father, Charlie Sullivan Sr. played in six Briers for New Brunswick.
