= Brad Heidt =

Canadian curler

- Curler

Team
- Curling club: Kerrobert CC, Kerrobert, SK

Curling career
- Brier: 2 (1982, 1995)
Medal record
Men's curling
Representing Saskatchewan
Labatt Brier
Silver medal – second place	1995 Halifax

Bradley D. Heidt (born c. 1958) is a Canadian curler from Kerrobert, Saskatchewan. He is a two-time provincial champion.

== Career ==
In 1982, Heidt and his team of Wayne Charteris, John Whetter and Warren Rechenmacher finished 5-6 at the Labatt Brier. He won his second provincial championship 13 years later, sending him to the 1995 Labatt Brier. His team of Mark Dacey, Charteris and Dan Ormsby finished the round robin in second place with an 8-3 record. He then lost to Manitoba's Kerry Burtnyk in the final, to finish second.

Heidt remains skipping one of the top teams in Saskatchewan. He has won six World Curling Tour events in his career.

Heidt is also a former provincial mixed champion and in 2010, he won his first provincial seniors title (over 50).

== Personal life ==
As of the 1995 Brier, Heidt was employed as a farmer.
