= Rob Meakin =

Canadian curler (born 1964)

- Curler ♂
- Born: December 16, 1964 (age 61); Winnipeg, Manitoba, Canada

Team
- Curling club: Assiniboine Memorial CC, Winnipeg, MB

Curling career
- Member Association: Manitoba
- Brier: 2: (1995, 2001)
- World Championship: 1 (1995)
Medal record
Curling
Representing Canada
World Championships
| Gold medal – first place | 1995 Brandon |
Representing Manitoba
The Brier
| Gold medal – first place | 1995 Halifax |
| Silver medal – second place | 2001 Ottawa |
Canadian Olympic Curling Trials
| Silver medal – second place | 2001 Regina |

Robert Meakin (born December 16, 1964) is a Canadian curler and curling coach.

He is a 1995 World Men's champion and a 1995 Labatt Brier champion.

== Awards ==
- Manitoba Sports Hall of Fame:
  - inducted in 2002 with the 1995 Kerry Burtnyk team, Canadian and World champions
  - inducted in 2000 with the 1988 Jeff Stoughton’s mixed team, Canadian mixed champions

== Teams ==
=== Men's ===
| Season | Skip | Third | Second | Lead | Alternate | Events |
|---|---|---|---|---|---|---|
| 1994–95 | Kerry Burtnyk | Jeff Ryan | Rob Meakin | Keith Fenton | Denis Fillion | Brier 1995 (gold); WCC 1995 (gold) |
| 1996–97 | Kerry Burtnyk | Jeff Ryan | Rob Meakin | Keith Fenton | | |
| 1997–98 | Kerry Burtnyk | Jeff Ryan | Rob Meakin | Keith Fenton | Scott Grant | COCT 1997 (4th) |
| 1999–00 | Kerry Burtnyk | Jeff Ryan | Rob Meakin | Keith Fenton | | |
| 2000–01 | Kerry Burtnyk | Jeff Ryan | Rob Meakin | Keith Fenton | Andy Hick | Brier 2001 (silver) |
| 2001–02 | Kerry Burtnyk | Jeff Ryan | Rob Meakin | Keith Fenton | Andy Hick | COCT 2001 (silver) |
| 2007–08 | Kerry Burtnyk | Dan Kammerlock | Richard Daneault | Rob Meakin | | |

=== Mixed ===
| Season | Skip | Third | Second | Lead | Events |
|---|---|---|---|---|---|
| 1988 | Jeff Stoughton | Karen Fallis | Rob Meakin | Lynn Morrow | CMxCC 1988 (gold) |
| 1989 | Jeff Stoughton | Karen Fallis | Rob Meakin | Lynn Morrow | CMxCC 1989 (silver) |

== Record as a coach of national teams ==
| Year | Tournament, event | National team | Place |
|---|---|---|---|
| 2009 | 2009 World Junior Curling Championships | Canada (junior women) | 2nd place, silver medalist(s) |

== Personal life ==
His daughter is Breanne Knapp (née Meakin), Canadian female curler, 2014 Scotties bronze medallist and 2009 World Junior silver medallist. He is married and also has a son. He currently works as vice president, sales and marketing at Pride Electronics Inc.
