= Jim Sullivan (curler) =

Canadian curler

- Curler
- Born: January 6, 1968; Saint John, New Brunswick
- Died: November 12, 2011 (aged 43); Fredericton, New Brunswick

Curling career
- Brier: 2 (1990, 2001)
Medal record
Curling
Representing Canada
World Junior Championships
Gold medal – first place	1988 Füssen
Representing New Brunswick
Labatt Brier
Silver medal – second place	1990 Sault Ste. Marie

James David Sullivan (January 6, 1968 - November 12, 2011) was a Canadian curler from Saint John, New Brunswick. He was a renowned curler, being skip of the Jim Sullivan Rink which captured the 1987 Canadian Junior Curling Championships for New Brunswick, and the 1988 World Junior Curling Championships. In 1990, Sullivan and his team were the silver medallists at the Labatt Brier. Sullivan continued to be active in curling, being a member of Thistle St. Andrews Curling Club, and an Honorary Life Member of the Capital Winter Club in Fredericton.

Sullivan experienced depression and died by suicide in 2011.

Sullivan's cousin was another curler, Charlie Sullivan, as was his uncle, Charlie Sullivan, Sr.
