= Keith Fenton =

Canadian curler (born 1960)

- Curler ♂
- Born: June 19, 1960 (age 66)

Team
- Curling club: Deer Lodge CC, Assiniboine Memorial CC, Winnipeg, MB

Curling career
- Member Association: Manitoba
- Brier: 2: (1995, 2001)
- World Championship: 1 (1995)
Medal record
Curling
Representing Canada
World Championships
Gold medal – first place	1995 Brandon
Representing Manitoba
The Brier
Gold medal – first place	1995 Halifax
Silver medal – second place	2001 Ottawa
Canadian Olympic Curling Trials
Silver medal – second place	2001 Regina

Keith Fenton (born June 19, 1960) is a Canadian curler.

He is a 1995 World Men's champion and a 1995 Labatt Brier champion.

== Awards ==
- Manitoba Sports Hall of Fame: inducted in 2002 with all of 1995 Kerry Burtnyk team, Canadian and World champions

== Teams ==
Season	Skip	Third	Second	Lead	Alternate	Events
1985–86	Jeff Stoughton	Fred Cleutinx	Rob Meakin	Keith Fenton		
1993–94	Jeff Ryan	Dave Iverson	Keith Fenton	Terry Henry		
1994–95	Kerry Burtnyk	Jeff Ryan	Rob Meakin	Keith Fenton	Denis Fillion	Brier 1995 (gold); WCC 1995 (gold)
1996–97	Kerry Burtnyk	Jeff Ryan	Rob Meakin	Keith Fenton		
1997–98	Kerry Burtnyk	Jeff Ryan	Rob Meakin	Keith Fenton	Scott Grant	COCT 1997 (4th)
1999–00	Kerry Burtnyk	Jeff Ryan	Rob Meakin	Keith Fenton		
2000–01	Kerry Burtnyk	Jeff Ryan	Rob Meakin	Keith Fenton	Andy Hick	Brier 2001 (silver)
2001–02	Kerry Burtnyk	Jeff Ryan	Rob Meakin	Keith Fenton	Andy Hick	COCT 2001 (silver)
2001–02	Kerry Burtnyk	Jeff Ryan	Rob Fowler	Keith Fenton		
2002–03	Kerry Burtnyk	Jeff Ryan	Rob Fowler	Keith Fenton		
2003–04	Kerry Burtnyk	Ken Tresoor	Rob Fowler	Keith Fenton		CC 2004 (4th)
2004–05	Kerry Burtnyk	Ken Tresoor	Rob Fowler	Keith Fenton		CC 2005 (4th)
2005–06	Dave Boehmer	Ken Tresoor	Pat Spiring	Keith Fenton		
2007–08	Vic Peters	Ken Tresoor	Chris Neufeld	Keith Fenton		
2008–09	Vic Peters	Ken Tresoor	Chris Neufeld	Keith Fenton		
