= Kerry Burtnyk =

Canadian curler (born 1958)

- Curler
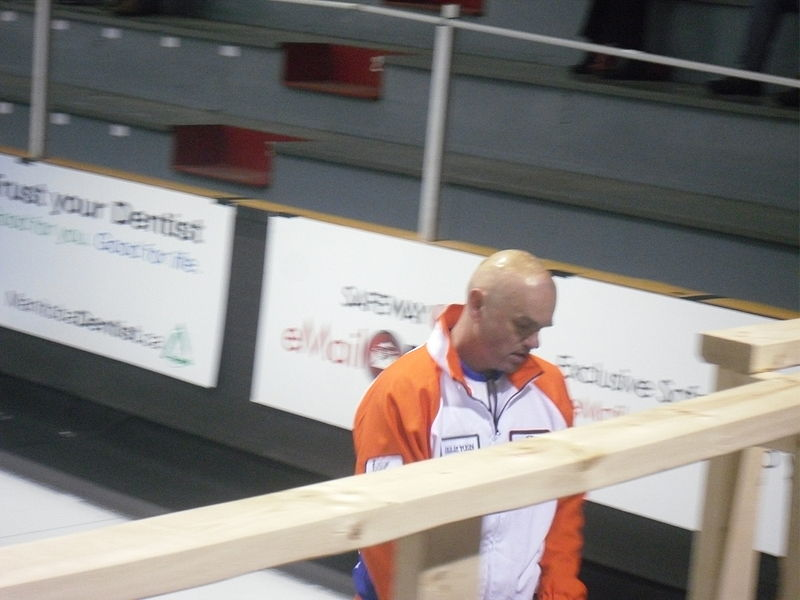
- Born: November 24, 1958 (age 67); Reston, Manitoba, Canada

Curling career
- Brier: 5 (1981, 1988, 1995, 2001, 2008
- Top CTRS ranking: 4th (2007–08)
Medal record
Representing Canada
World Curling Championships
Gold medal – first place	1995 Brandon
Bronze medal – third place	1981 London
Representing Manitoba
Labatt Brier
Gold medal – first place	1981 Halifax
Gold medal – first place	1995 Halifax
Silver medal – second place	2001 Ottawa
Canadian Olympic Curling Trials
Silver medal – second place	2001 Regina
Canada Winter Games
Gold medal – first place	1979 Brandon

Kerry Burtnyk (born November 24, 1958) is a Canadian curler from Winnipeg, Manitoba. He grew up in Reston, Manitoba. He is a two time Canadian champion skip, and the 1995 World Champion skip. He is currently the coach of the Darcy Robertson rink.

== Career ==
Burtnyk's first Brier in 1981 would be a success for him. His Manitoba team of Mark Olson, Jim Spencer and Ron Kammerlock defeated Northern Ontario, skipped by Al Hackner in the final. Burtnyk became the youngest skip to win the Brier in history, as he was 22 years and 4 months old at the time. At that year's World Championship, Burtnyk would have to settle for the bronze medal.

Burtnyk returned to the Brier in 1988, but he missed the playoffs despite a 7–4 record.

He returned to the Brier once again in 1995 where he would win his second Brier with teammates Jeff Ryan, Rob Meakin and Keith Fenton. In the final, Burtnyk defeated Saskatchewan, skipped by Brad Heidt. At the Worlds, Burtnyk and his team claimed gold, defeating Scotland and their skip Gordon Muirhead.

In the 2001 Nokia Brier Burtnyk skipped his Manitoba team to the final, but bowed out to the Randy Ferbey skipped-Alberta team. In December of that year, he lost to Kevin Martin in the final of the Canadian Olympic Trials, missing his chance to represent Canada at the 2002 Winter Olympics.

Burtnyk announced his retirement in 2005 from the game, but returned in 2006 with a new team, and would shortly after win the 2008 Manitoba championship over David Bohn. He represented Manitoba in the 2008 Tim Hortons Brier but ended up just outside the playoffs with a 6–5 record.

Burtnyk again announced his retirement following the 2009–10 season. However, he would play alternate for Garth Smith at the provincial 2011 Safeway Championships.

== Personal ==
Burtnyk is married to Patti Burtnyk and has two daughters. He is currently retired. Burtnyk previously worked as a sales investment advisor for Wellington West.

== Grand Slam Record ==
Key
C	Champion
F	Lost in Final
SF	Lost in Semifinal
QF	Lost in Quarterfinals
R16	Lost in the round of 16
Q	Did not advance to playoffs
T2	Played in Tier 2 event
DNP	Did not participate in event
N/A	Not a Grand Slam event that season

Event	2001–02	2002–03	2003–04	2004–05	2005–06	2006–07	2007–08	2008–09	2009-10
Canadian Open	Q	QF	SF	QF	DNP	Q	Q	QF	Q
Masters	Q	QF	QF	QF	DNP	Q	SF	Q	DNP
The National	SF	Q	SF	QF	DNP	Q	QF	QF	Q
Players' Championships	Q	Q	Q	DNP	DNP	Q	QF	Q	DNP
