= 2017 Pepsi Tankard =

Curling championship in New Brunswick, Canada

- Host city: Saint John, New Brunswick
- Dates: Feb 8-12
- Winner: Mike Kennedy
- Curling club: Capital Winter Club, Fredericton, NB
- Skip: Mike Kennedy
- Third: Scott Jones
- Second: Marc LeCocq
- Lead: Jamie Brannen
- Finalist: Charlie Sullivan

The 2017 Pepsi Tankard, the provincial men's curling championship of New Brunswick was held February 8 to 12 in Saint John, New Brunswick. The winning Mike Kennedy rink represented New Brunswick at the 2017 Tim Hortons Brier in St. John's, Newfoundland and Labrador.

== Teams ==
The teams are listed as follows:

Skip	Third	Second	Lead	Club(s)
Josh Barry	Rene Comeau	Andrew Burgess	Robert Daley	Capital Winter Club, Fredericton
Ryan Cain	Dmitri Makrides	Chris Jenkins	Mike Flannery Jr.	Capital Winter Club, Fredericton
James Grattan	Paul Flemming	Kevin Boyle	Peter Case	Gage Golf & Curling Club, Oromocto
Mike Kennedy	Scott Jones	Marc LeCocq	Jamie Brannen	Capital Winter Club, Fredericton
Jeremy Mallais	Jason Vaughan	Ryan Freeze	Jared Bezanson	Thistle-St. Andrew's Curling Club, Saint John
Terry Odishaw	Grant Odishaw	Chris Jeffrey	Mark Kehoe	Curl Moncton, Moncton
Jason Roach	Andy McCann	Darren Roach	Brian King	Thistle-St. Andrew's Curling Club, Saint John
Charlie Sullivan	Paul Dobson	Mark Dobson	Spencer Mawhinney	Thistle-St. Andrew's Curling Club, Saint John

== Round-robin standings ==
Key
Teams to Playoffs
Teams to Tiebreakers

Team	W	L
Kennedy	6	1
Sullivan	4	3
Grattan	4	3
Roach	4	3
Malliais	3	4
Odishaw	3	4
Barry	3	4
Cain	1	6

=== Scores ===
Draw 1

- Roach 6-5 Barry
- Kennedy 9-4 Cain
- Grattan 6-5 Mallais
- Odishaw 10-4 Sullivan

Draw 2

- Kennedy 8-5 Sullivan
- Mallais 8-3 Barry
- Odishaw 8-5 Cain
- Grattan 6-5 Roach

Draw 3

- Mallais 8-3 Cain
- Grattan 7-0 Odishaw
- Sullivan 8-6 Roach
- Barry 6-5 Kennedy

Draw 4

- Kennedy 6-4 Odishaw
- Sullivan 7-5 Cain
- Grattan 8-5 Barry
- Roach 7-5 Mallais

Draw 5

- Roach 8-4 Cain
- Kennedy 8-5 Grattan
- Sullivan 8-4 Mallais
- Odishaw 10-7 Barry

Draw 6

- Mallais 6-1 Odishaw
- Barry 8-6 Sullivan
- Kennedy 8-4 Roach
- Cain 7-6 Grattan

Draw 7

- Sullivan 9-6 Grattan
- Roach 10-6 Odishaw
- Barry 7-4 Cain
- Kennedy 6-3 Mallais

Tiebreaker

- Grattan 8-1 Roach

== Playoffs ==
Semifinal			Final
			1	Mike Kennedy	7
2	Charlie Sullivan	8	2	Charlie Sullivan	5
3	James Grattan	6

=== Semifinal ===
Saturday, February 11, 7:00 pm

Sheet 3	1	2	3	4	5	6	7	8	9	10	Final
Charlie Sullivan 🔨	2	0	0	0	4	0	1	0	1	X	8
James Grattan	0	2	0	1	0	1	0	2	0	X	6

=== Final ===
Sunday, February 12, 5:00 pm

Sheet 3	1	2	3	4	5	6	7	8	9	10	Final
Mike Kennedy 🔨	0	0	2	0	0	1	0	1	3	0	7
Charlie Sullivan	0	3	0	1	0	0	0	0	0	1	5

2017 Pepsi Tankard

Mike Kennedy
6th New Brunswick Provincial Championship title
