= 2020 New Brunswick Tankard =

- Host city: Fredericton, New Brunswick
- Arena: Capital Winter Club
- Dates: January 29 – February 2
- Winner: Team Grattan
- Curling club: Gage Golf & Curling Club, Oromocto
- Skip: James Grattan
- Third: Paul Dobson
- Second: Andy McCann
- Lead: Jamie Brannen
- Alternate: Chris Jeffrey
- Finalist: Jason Roach

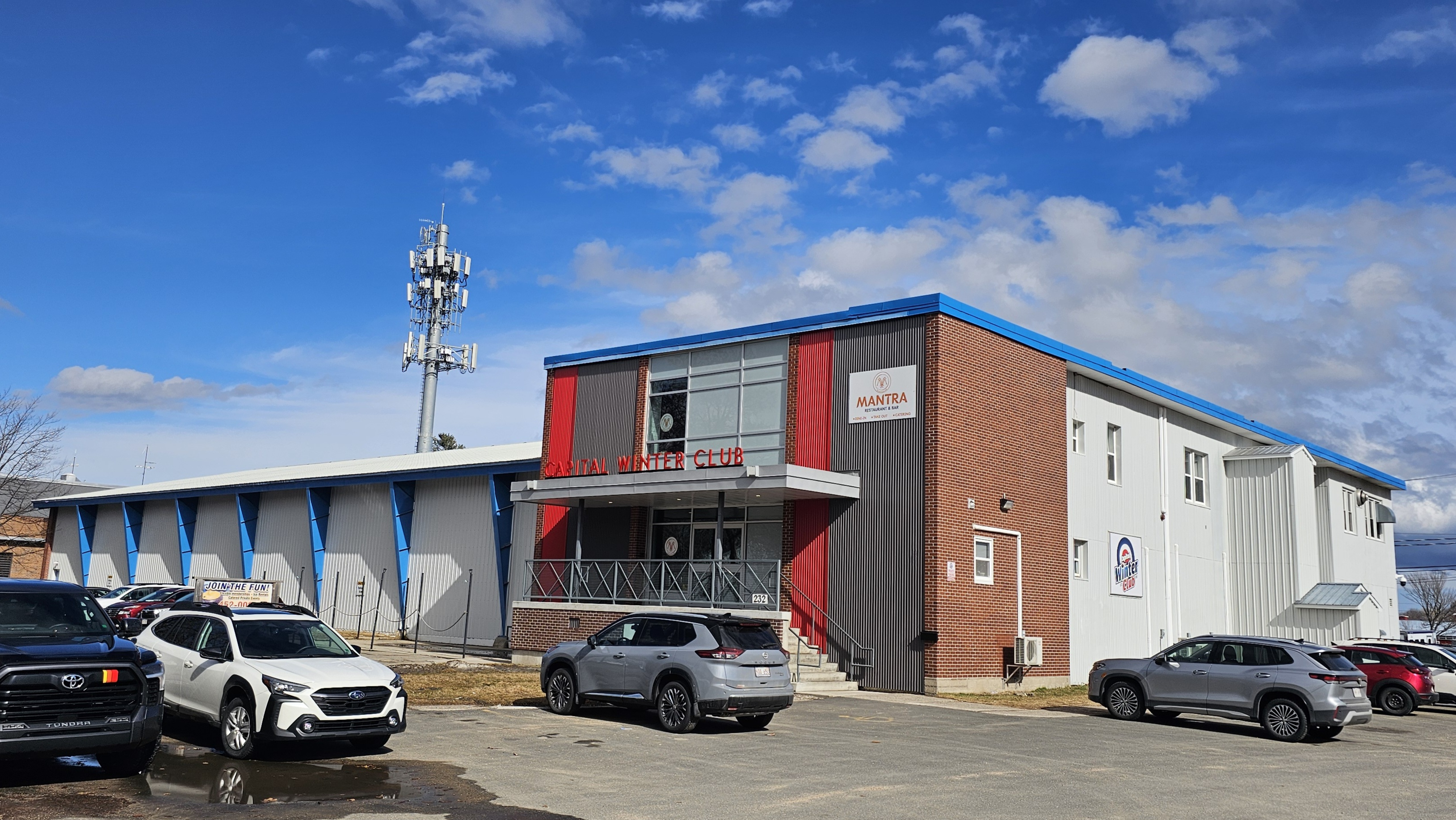
The Capital Winter Club in 2026

The 2020 New Brunswick Tankard, the provincial men's curling championship of New Brunswick was held January 29 to February 2 at the Capital Winter Club in Fredericton, New Brunswick. The winning James Grattan rink represented New Brunswick at the 2020 Tim Hortons Brier in Kingston, Ontario and finished with a 3–4 record.

James Grattan stole two in the tenth end of the final to defeat Jason Roach and win his thirteenth provincial title.

== Teams ==
The teams are listed as follows:

Skip	Third	Second	Lead	Alternate	Club
Ryan Cain	Scott Archibald	Kevin Keefe	Mike Flannery Jr.		Capital Winter Club
Rene Comeau	Ryan Freeze	Jordon Craft	Zac Blanchard		Thistle Saint Andrew Curling Club
Ed Cyr	Alex Robichaud	Chris Wagner	Alex Kyle		Capital Winter Club
James Grattan	Paul Dobson	Andy McCann	Jamie Brannen	Chris Jeffrey	Gage Golf & Curling Club
Trevor Hanson	Adam MacDonald	Chris Jenkins	Chris Cogswell		Gage Golf & Curling Club
Scott Jones	Jeremy Mallais	Brian King	Robert Daley		Curl Moncton
Terry Odishaw	Mike Kennedy	Marc LeCocq	Grant Odishaw		Curl Moncton
Jason Roach	Darren Roach	Spencer Mawhinney	Jared Bezanson		Thistle Saint Andrew Curling Club

== Round-robin standings ==
Final round-robin standings

Key
Teams to Playoffs
Teams to Tiebreakers

Skip	W	L
James Grattan	6	1
Jason Roach	5	2
Scott Jones	4	3
Terry Odishaw	4	3
Rene Comeau	3	4
Trevor Hanson	3	4
Ed Cyr	2	5
Ryan Cain	1	6

== Round-robin results ==
All draw times are listed in Atlantic Time (UTC-04:00).

=== Draw 1 ===
Wednesday, January 29, 1:30 pm

Sheet 1	1	2	3	4	5	6	7	8	9	10	Final
Scott Jones 🔨	2	2	0	3	0	2	X	X	X	X	9
Rene Comeau	0	0	2	0	1	0	X	X	X	X	3

Sheet 2	1	2	3	4	5	6	7	8	9	10	Final
James Grattan 🔨	0	0	2	0	0	0	2	0	0	2	6
Ed Cyr	0	0	0	0	2	0	0	1	0	0	3

Sheet 3	1	2	3	4	5	6	7	8	9	10	Final
Jason Roach	0	1	1	0	2	0	3	0	0	3	10
Ryan Cain 🔨	1	0	0	1	0	2	0	4	1	0	9

Sheet 4	1	2	3	4	5	6	7	8	9	10	Final
Terry Odishaw 🔨	0	1	1	0	4	0	1	0	0	3	10
Trevor Hanson	0	0	0	3	0	1	0	4	0	0	8

=== Draw 2 ===
Wednesday, January 29, 7:30 pm

Sheet 1	1	2	3	4	5	6	7	8	9	10	Final
Ryan Cain	0	0	0	2	1	1	1	0	1	X	6
Terry Odishaw 🔨	1	0	1	0	0	0	0	1	0	X	3

Sheet 2	1	2	3	4	5	6	7	8	9	10	Final
Jason Roach 🔨	0	1	0	0	1	0	0	0	1	0	3
Trevor Hanson	0	0	1	0	0	2	0	1	0	1	5

Sheet 3	1	2	3	4	5	6	7	8	9	10	Final
James Grattan 🔨	2	0	0	1	1	0	0	0	0	1	5
Rene Comeau	0	0	1	0	0	1	0	0	1	0	3

Sheet 4	1	2	3	4	5	6	7	8	9	10	Final
Ed Cyr	0	2	0	0	0	0	2	1	0	2	7
Scott Jones 🔨	1	0	1	1	1	1	0	0	1	0	6

=== Draw 3 ===
Thursday, January 30, 1:00 pm

Sheet 1	1	2	3	4	5	6	7	8	9	10	Final
James Grattan 🔨	0	0	0	1	0	2	0	1	0	0	4
Jason Roach	0	1	0	0	3	0	1	0	1	1	7

Sheet 2	1	2	3	4	5	6	7	8	9	10	Final
Ed Cyr	0	3	0	1	0	0	2	2	4	X	12
Ryan Cain 🔨	2	0	3	0	0	1	0	0	0	X	6

Sheet 3	1	2	3	4	5	6	7	8	9	10	Final
Scott Jones 🔨	0	0	0	2	0	2	0	4	0	X	8
Trevor Hanson	0	0	1	0	2	0	2	0	1	X	6

Sheet 4	1	2	3	4	5	6	7	8	9	10	Final
Rene Comeau	0	1	0	0	1	0	0	X	X	X	2
Terry Odishaw 🔨	1	0	4	1	0	1	1	X	X	X	8

=== Draw 4 ===
Thursday, January 30, 7:00 pm

Sheet 1	1	2	3	4	5	6	7	8	9	10	Final
Rene Comeau 🔨	0	1	1	0	0	1	0	2	2	X	7
Trevor Hanson	0	0	0	1	1	0	1	0	0	X	3

Sheet 2	1	2	3	4	5	6	7	8	9	10	Final
Scott Jones	0	0	0	0	1	0	1	0	X	X	2
Terry Odishaw 🔨	0	2	1	1	0	1	0	2	X	X	7

Sheet 3	1	2	3	4	5	6	7	8	9	10	Final
Ed Cyr	0	1	0	1	0	1	0	0	X	X	3
Jason Roach 🔨	1	0	0	0	3	0	0	5	X	X	9

Sheet 4	1	2	3	4	5	6	7	8	9	10	Final
James Grattan	0	0	4	0	3	0	1	0	0	X	8
Ryan Cain 🔨	2	0	0	1	0	1	0	1	1	X	6

=== Draw 5 ===
Friday, January 31, 1:00 pm

Sheet 1	1	2	3	4	5	6	7	8	9	10	Final
Terry Odishaw 🔨	2	0	0	1	0	1	0	0	2	2	8
Ed Cyr	0	1	0	0	1	0	0	1	0	0	3

Sheet 2	1	2	3	4	5	6	7	8	9	10	Final
Trevor Hanson 🔨	0	0	0	0	0	1	0	1	X	X	2
James Grattan	2	0	1	0	2	0	1	0	X	X	6

Sheet 3	1	2	3	4	5	6	7	8	9	10	Final
Ryan Cain 🔨	1	1	0	0	0	1	0	1	0	0	4
Scott Jones	0	0	0	1	1	0	3	0	1	1	7

Sheet 4	1	2	3	4	5	6	7	8	9	10	Final
Jason Roach 🔨	0	2	0	1	1	1	0	X	X	X	5
Rene Comeau	0	0	0	0	0	0	1	X	X	X	1

=== Draw 6 ===
Friday, January 31, 7:00 pm

Sheet 1	1	2	3	4	5	6	7	8	9	10	Final
Jason Roach	0	0	2	0	0	3	0	2	0	X	7
Scott Jones 🔨	1	2	0	1	1	0	1	0	3	X	9

Sheet 2	1	2	3	4	5	6	7	8	9	10	Final
Ryan Cain 🔨	0	2	0	0	0	1	0	1	0	X	4
Rene Comeau	1	0	2	1	1	0	1	0	1	X	7

Sheet 3	1	2	3	4	5	6	7	8	9	10	Final
Terry Odishaw	0	1	0	2	0	0	0	X	X	X	3
James Grattan 🔨	2	0	3	0	2	0	2	X	X	X	9

Sheet 4	1	2	3	4	5	6	7	8	9	10	Final
Trevor Hanson	1	2	1	0	0	1	0	1	1	X	7
Ed Cyr 🔨	0	0	0	2	0	0	1	0	0	X	3

=== Draw 7 ===
Saturday, February 1, 9:00 am

Sheet 1	1	2	3	4	5	6	7	8	9	10	Final
Trevor Hanson 🔨	0	4	4	3	0	X	X	X	X	X	11
Ryan Cain	1	0	0	0	2	X	X	X	X	X	3

Sheet 2	1	2	3	4	5	6	7	8	9	10	Final
Terry Odishaw	0	0	1	1	0	2	0	1	X	X	5
Jason Roach 🔨	0	3	0	0	2	0	3	0	X	X	8

Sheet 3	1	2	3	4	5	6	7	8	9	10	Final
Rene Comeau	1	0	1	2	0	0	0	0	1	X	5
Ed Cyr 🔨	0	2	0	0	0	1	0	1	0	X	4

Sheet 4	1	2	3	4	5	6	7	8	9	10	Final
Scott Jones	1	0	0	1	0	0	0	0	0	X	3
James Grattan 🔨	0	1	0	0	2	2	0	2	2	X	9

=== Tiebreaker ===
Saturday, February 1, 2:00 pm

Sheet 4	1	2	3	4	5	6	7	8	9	10	Final
Scott Jones	0	1	0	1	0	1	1	3	0	1	8
Terry Odishaw 🔨	1	0	1	0	3	0	0	0	0	0	5

== Playoffs ==
Semifinal			Final
			1	James Grattan	8
2	Jason Roach	8	2	Jason Roach	6
3	Scott Jones	5

=== Semifinal ===
Saturday, February 1, 7:00 pm

Sheet 3	1	2	3	4	5	6	7	8	9	10	Final
Jason Roach 🔨	2	0	1	2	0	0	2	1	0	X	8
Scott Jones	0	1	0	0	2	1	0	0	1	X	5

=== Final ===
Sunday, February 2, 2:00 pm

Sheet 4	1	2	3	4	5	6	7	8	9	10	Final
James Grattan 🔨	1	0	0	2	0	0	1	0	2	2	8
Jason Roach	0	3	0	0	1	1	0	1	0	0	6

2020 New Brunswick Tankard

James Grattan
13th New Brunswick Provincial Championship title
