= 2011 Molson Canadian Men's Provincial Curling Championship =

- Host city: Miramichi, New Brunswick
- Arena: Miramichi Curling Club
- Dates: February 2–6
- Winner: Team Grattan
- Curling club: Gage G&CC, Oromocto
- Skip: James Grattan
- Third: Charles Sullivan
- Second: Steven Howard
- Lead: Peter Case
- Finalist: Rick Perron

The 2011 Molson Canadian Men's Provincial Curling Championship, the provincial men's curling championship for New Brunswick was held from February 2 to 6 at the Miramichi Curling Club in Miramichi, New Brunswick. The winning James Grattan rink represented New Brunswick at the 2011 Tim Hortons Brier in London, Ontario.

== Teams ==
The teams are listed as follows:

Skip	Third	Second	Lead	Club(s)
Paul Dobson	Kevin Boyle	Mark Dobson	Spencer Mawhinney	Thistle St. Andrews CC, Saint John
Derek Ellard	David Nolan	Shaun Mott	Nick McCann	Gladstone CC, Fredericton Junction
James Grattan	Charles Sullivan	Steven Howard	Peter Case	Gage G&CC, Oromocto
Scott Jones	Andy McCann	Brian King	Ronnie Burgess	Beaver CC, Moncton
Jeremy Mallais	Jason Roach	Darren Roach	Jared Bezanson	Curling Beauséjour, Moncton
Terry Odishaw	Mike Flemming	Jason Vaughan	Paul Nason	Curling Beauséjour, Moncton
Rick Perron	Grant Odishaw	Marc LeCocq	Jeff Lacey	Curling Beauséjour, Moncton
Gary Sullivan	Chris Smith	Scott Kidd	Mark Hudson	Carleton CC, Saint John

== Round Robin standings ==
Final Round Robin standings

Key
Teams to Playoffs

Skip	W	L	W–L	PF	PA	EW	EL	BE	SE
Rick Perron	6	1	–	49	44	31	25	7	9
Paul Dobson	5	2	1–0	46	31	31	25	8	13
James Grattan	5	2	0–1	36	35	28	27	10	6
Terry Odishaw	4	3	–	39	34	28	24	9	8
Jeremy Mallais	3	4	1–0	48	36	25	25	8	8
Scott Jones	3	4	0–1	42	41	25	31	9	9
Derek Ellard	1	6	1–0	33	48	24	32	5	6
Gary Sullivan	1	6	0–1	33	57	23	31	4	7

== Round Robin results ==
All draw times listed in Atlantic Time (UTC−04:00).

=== Draw 1 ===
Wednesday, February 2, 6:30 pm

Sheet 2	1	2	3	4	5	6	7	8	9	10	Final
James Grattan	2	0	2	0	1	0	1	X	X	X	6
Terry Odishaw 🔨	0	0	0	1	0	1	0	X	X	X	2

Sheet 3	1	2	3	4	5	6	7	8	9	10	Final
Jeremy Mallais 🔨	0	2	1	0	0	3	0	4	X	X	10
Derek Ellard	3	0	0	1	0	0	2	0	X	X	6

Sheet 4	1	2	3	4	5	6	7	8	9	10	Final
Paul Dobson 🔨	0	0	1	0	0	1	1	1	0	0	4
Scott Jones	1	0	0	0	2	0	0	0	1	2	6

Sheet 5	1	2	3	4	5	6	7	8	9	10	Final
Rick Perron	2	3	0	1	2	0	0	0	1	X	9
Gary Sullivan 🔨	0	0	1	0	0	2	2	2	0	X	7

=== Draw 2 ===
Thursday, February 3, 9:00 am

Sheet 2	1	2	3	4	5	6	7	8	9	10	11	Final
Scott Jones	0	0	1	0	1	1	0	2	0	3	0	8
Rick Perron 🔨	0	3	0	3	0	0	1	0	1	0	2	10

Sheet 3	1	2	3	4	5	6	7	8	9	10	Final
Gary Sullivan 🔨	0	0	0	0	1	0	X	X	X	X	1
Paul Dobson	1	3	2	2	0	3	X	X	X	X	11

Sheet 4	1	2	3	4	5	6	7	8	9	10	Final
Jeremy Mallais	0	0	2	0	0	1	0	X	X	X	3
Terry Odishaw 🔨	1	1	0	2	1	0	3	X	X	X	9

Sheet 5	1	2	3	4	5	6	7	8	9	10	11	Final
James Grattan 🔨	0	1	0	1	0	1	0	1	1	0	1	6
Derek Ellard	1	0	1	0	1	0	1	0	0	1	0	5

=== Draw 3 ===
Thursday, February 3, 2:00 pm

Sheet 2	1	2	3	4	5	6	7	8	9	10	Final
Paul Dobson 🔨	0	0	1	1	0	1	1	0	X	X	4
Derek Ellard	0	1	0	0	1	0	0	1	X	X	3

Sheet 3	1	2	3	4	5	6	7	8	9	10	Final
Rick Perron	0	1	0	1	0	0	0	0	2	X	4
Terry Odishaw 🔨	1	0	2	0	1	0	0	1	0	X	5

Sheet 4	1	2	3	4	5	6	7	8	9	10	Final
James Grattan	0	0	2	0	2	0	1	0	1	1	7
Gary Sullivan 🔨	0	1	0	2	0	2	0	1	0	0	6

Sheet 5	1	2	3	4	5	6	7	8	9	10	Final
Jeremy Mallais	1	1	0	0	2	0	0	3	1	X	8
Scott Jones 🔨	0	0	1	1	0	2	0	0	0	X	4

=== Draw 4 ===
Thursday, February 3, 7:00 pm

Sheet 2	1	2	3	4	5	6	7	8	9	10	Final
Gary Sullivan 🔨	0	1	0	0	2	0	0	X	X	X	3
Jeremy Mallais	0	0	3	1	0	5	1	X	X	X	10

Sheet 3	1	2	3	4	5	6	7	8	9	10	Final
Scott Jones	0	2	0	0	1	0	0	1	1	0	5
James Grattan 🔨	0	0	1	0	0	3	0	0	0	3	7

Sheet 4	1	2	3	4	5	6	7	8	9	10	Final
Rick Perron	0	3	1	0	2	0	2	1	0	X	9
Derek Ellard 🔨	2	0	0	1	0	3	0	0	0	X	6

Sheet 5	1	2	3	4	5	6	7	8	9	10	Final
Paul Dobson 🔨	0	1	0	0	2	0	0	3	0	1	7
Terry Odishaw	1	0	0	1	0	0	2	0	1	0	5

=== Draw 5 ===
Friday, February 4, 1:00 pm

Sheet 2	1	2	3	4	5	6	7	8	9	10	Final
Terry Odishaw 🔨	0	2	0	0	2	0	0	1	0	X	5
Scott Jones	2	0	1	0	0	1	2	0	2	X	8

Sheet 3	1	2	3	4	5	6	7	8	9	10	Final
Jeremy Mallais 🔨	0	0	1	0	1	1	0	1	X	X	4
Rick Perron	0	3	0	2	0	0	3	0	X	X	8

Sheet 4	1	2	3	4	5	6	7	8	9	10	Final
James Grattan	0	1	0	0	1	1	0	0	1	0	4
Paul Dobson 🔨	1	0	0	2	0	0	1	1	0	1	6

Sheet 5	1	2	3	4	5	6	7	8	9	10	Final
Derek Ellard 🔨	1	1	2	0	3	0	1	0	1	X	9
Gary Sullivan	0	0	0	2	0	1	0	2	0	X	5

=== Draw 6 ===
Friday, February 4, 6:00 pm

Sheet 2	1	2	3	4	5	6	7	8	9	10	Final
Rick Perron 🔨	1	0	0	2	2	0	3	X	X	X	8
James Grattan	0	0	1	0	0	1	0	X	X	X	2

Sheet 3	1	2	3	4	5	6	7	8	9	10	Final
Derek Ellard	1	0	0	0	1	0	0	0	X	X	2
Scott Jones 🔨	0	1	1	1	0	0	1	4	X	X	8

Sheet 4	1	2	3	4	5	6	7	8	9	10	Final
Gary Sullivan	2	0	0	0	1	0	1	0	0	X	4
Terry Odishaw 🔨	0	1	3	1	0	3	0	0	0	X	8

Sheet 5	1	2	3	4	5	6	7	8	9	10	Final
Jeremy Mallais 🔨	0	2	0	2	1	0	0	0	0	X	5
Paul Dobson	3	0	2	0	0	0	1	1	1	X	8

=== Draw 7 ===
Saturday, February 5, 8:00 am

Sheet 2	1	2	3	4	5	6	7	8	9	10	Final
Scott Jones 🔨	0	0	0	1	0	2	0	0	X	X	3
Gary Sullivan	1	1	1	0	3	0	1	1	X	X	8

Sheet 3	1	2	3	4	5	6	7	8	9	10	Final
James Grattan 🔨	0	1	1	0	0	0	1	0	0	1	4
Jeremy Mallais	1	0	0	0	1	0	0	0	1	0	3

Sheet 4	1	2	3	4	5	6	7	8	9	10	11	Final
Paul Dobson 🔨	0	1	0	0	3	1	0	1	0	0	0	6
Rick Perron	0	0	1	1	0	0	1	0	2	1	1	7

Sheet 5	1	2	3	4	5	6	7	8	9	10	Final
Terry Odishaw	1	0	0	1	0	1	2	1	X	X	6
Derek Ellard	0	1	1	0	0	0	0	0	X	X	2

== Playoffs ==
Semifinal			Final
			1	Rick Perron	4
2	Paul Dobson	5	3	James Grattan	6
3	James Grattan	6

=== Semifinal ===
Saturday, February 5, 6:00 pm

Sheet 3	1	2	3	4	5	6	7	8	9	10	11	Final
Paul Dobson 🔨	0	2	1	0	0	1	0	0	1	0	0	5
James Grattan	0	0	0	3	0	0	0	1	0	1	1	6

=== Final ===
Sunday, February 6, 2:30 pm

Sheet 3	1	2	3	4	5	6	7	8	9	10	Final
Rick Perron 🔨	0	1	0	1	0	1	0	1	0	X	4
James Grattan	1	0	1	0	1	0	1	0	2	X	6

2011 Molson Canadian Men's Provincial Curling Championship

James Grattan
9th New Brunswick Provincial Championship title
