= 2018 Papa John's Pizza Tankard =

- Host city: Miramichi, New Brunswick
- Arena: Miramichi Curling Club
- Dates: Feb 7-11
- Winner: James Grattan
- Curling club: Gage Golf & Curling Club
- Skip: James Grattan
- Third: Chris Jeffrey
- Second: Andy McCann
- Lead: Peter Case
- Finalist: Terry Odishaw

The 2018 Papa John's Pizza Tankard, the provincial men's curling championship of New Brunswick was held February 7 to 11 in Miramichi, New Brunswick. The winning James Grattan rink represented New Brunswick at the 2018 Tim Hortons Brier in Regina.

== Teams ==
The teams are listed as follows:

Skip	Third	Second	Lead	Club(s)
Ryan Cain	Scott Archibald	Dmitri Makrides	Mike Flannery	Capital Winter Club, Fredericton
James Grattan	Chris Jeffrey	Andy McCann	Peter Case	Gage Golf & Curling Club, Oromocto
Scott Jones	Jamie Brannen	Brian King	Robert Daley	Curl Moncton, Moncton
Jeremy Mallais	Jason Vaughan	Darren Roach	Jared Bezanson	Thistle-St. Andrew's Curling Club, Saint John
Terry Odishaw	Mike Kennedy	Marc LeCocq	Grant Odishaw	Curl Moncton, Moncton
Marcel Robichaud	Damien Lahiton	Trevor Standen	Jesse Arseneau	Curl Moncton, Moncton
Paul Dobson	Charlie Sullivan (Skip)	Mark Dobson	Spencer Mawhinney	Thistle-St. Andrew's Curling Club, Saint John
Rene Comeau	Ed Cyr	Alex Kyle	Wayne Tallon (Skip)	Capital Winter Club, Fredericton

== Round robin standings ==
Key
Teams to Playoffs
Teams to Tiebreakers

Team	W	L
Odishaw	5	2
Grattan	4	3
Sullivan	4	3
Tallon	4	3
Mallais	4	3
Jones	3	4
Cain	2	5
Robichaud	2	5

== Scores ==
=== February 7 ===
Draw 1

- Cain 7-5 Sullivan
- Mallais 10-6 Odishaw
- Grattan 9-2 Robichaud
- Tallon 7-4 Jones

Draw 2

- Odishaw 8-3 Jones
- Grattan 11-7 Cain
- Mallais 8-3 Tallon
- Sullivan 10-2 Robichaud

=== February 8 ===
Draw 3

- Mallais 7-3 Grattan
- Tallon 9-4 Robichaud
- Sullivan 11-10 Jones
- Odishaw 6-4 Cain

Draw 4

- Odishaw 6-5 Tallon
- Jones 8-4 Mallais
- Cain 6-3 Robichaud
- Grattan 8-2 Sullivan

=== February 9 ===
Draw 5

- Sullivan 6-5 Mallais
- Robichaud 8-5 Odishaw
- Grattan 7-4 Jones
- Tallon 7-2 Cain

Draw 6

- Tallon 7-4 Grattan
- Jones 9-5 Cain
- Odishaw 8-6 Sullivan
- Robichaud 6-3 Mallais

=== February 10 ===
Draw 7

- Jones 8-6 Robichaud
- Sullivan 7-6 Tallon
- Mallais 9-7 Cain
- Odishaw 6-5 Grattan

=== Playoffs ===
Tiebreakers		Semifinal		Final
James Grattan	5
Charlie Sullivan	3	James Grattan	7
Wayne Tallon	2	Jeremy Mallais	2
Jeremy Mallais	7			Terry Odishaw	4
				James Grattan	10

==== Semifinal ====
February 10, 8:00

Team	1	2	3	4	5	6	7	8	9	10	Final
James Grattan	0	2	1	2	1	1	0	X	X	X	7
Jeremy Mallais 🔨	1	0	0	0	0	0	1	X	X	X	2

==== Final ====
February 11, 2:00pm

Team	1	2	3	4	5	6	7	8	9	10	Final
James Grattan	1	0	4	1	0	1	0	0	3	X	10
Terry Odishaw 🔨	0	0	0	0	2	0	0	2	0	X	4

2018 Papa John's Pizza Tankard

James Grattan
12th New Brunswick Provincial Championship title
