= 2022 Tim Hortons Brier =

Canadian men's curling championship

- Host city: Lethbridge, Alberta
- Arena: ENMAX Centre
- Dates: March 4–13
- Attendance: 74,238
- Winner: (Newfoundland and Labrador) Wild Card 1
- Curling club: St. John's CC, St. John's
- Skip: Brad Gushue
- Third: Mark Nichols
- Second: Brett Gallant
- Lead: Geoff Walker
- Coach: Jules Owchar
- Finalist: Alberta (Kevin Koe)

The 2022 Tim Hortons Brier, Canada's national men's curling championship, was held from March 4 to 13 at the ENMAX Centre in Lethbridge, Alberta. In the final, the defending Olympic bronze medallist Brad Gushue Wild Card #1 team, which also include Mark Nichols, Brett Gallant and Geoff Walker from Newfoundland and Labrador defeated Alberta, skipped by Kevin Koe. It was Gushue's fourth career Brier title, and the team did it shorthanded, as Nichols missed the playoffs due to testing positive for COVID-19. According to Curling Canada, it was the first time a three-player team won a Brier final. Gushue's four Brier wins ties the record with Ernie Richardson, Randy Ferbey, Kevin Martin and Koe for most Brier championships as a skip, and his rink tied the "Ferbey Four" for most Brier championships as a foursome with four titles. Gushue played as a Wild Card team as they missed the Newfoundland and Labrador provincials due to their participation in the Olympics, and were the first team to ever play at the Brier and the Olympics in the same year. They were also the first Wild Card team to win the Brier. The Gushue rink represented Canada at the 2022 World Men's Curling Championship at the Orleans Arena in Las Vegas, United States, where they won the silver medal.

== Summary ==
Prior to the event, four players tested positive for COVID-19, delaying their arrival to Lethbridge. Unlike the 2021 Brier, which was held in a centralized "bubble" behind closed doors to avoid the spread of COVID-19, testing was only done before the event, and not during the event. The event was also held after the lifting of many pandemic restrictions in Alberta, meaning not only were fans allowed to attend the Brier, they did not have to wear masks.

The event began with the playing of the Ukrainian national anthem before the first draw, as a tribute to the country that is currently being invaded by Russia. (Note: Ukraine is also the ancestral homeland of prominent Canadian championship winning curlers Ed Werenich and Sylvia Fedoruk, among others.)

Draw 3 saw 15 year old Nicholas Codner, the alternate on Newfoundland and Labrador, become the youngest ever curler in recorded Brier history when he was subbed in during their game against Alberta, breaking the record set by Manitoba's John Van Hellemond (brother of hockey referee Andy Van Hellemond) who was 16 at the 1958 Brier, and whose participation resulted in the ban of junior curlers at the Brier for nearly 60 years. Draw 3 also featured the "highly-anticipated" match between the defending champion Brendan Bottcher rink, representing Team Canada, and Team New Brunswick. Bottcher's former third, Darren Moulding, had been controversially kicked off the 2021 champion team, and had joined James Grattan, who won the New Brunswick berth. Despite Bottcher's team being from Alberta, fans were more supportive of New Brunswick, as Moulding is from the Lethbridge area. Team Canada ultimately won the game, 6–4.

Draw 10 saw brothers Marc and Glen Kennedy play against each other for the first time at the Brier, with the younger Marc playing for Northern Ontario making his 11th Brier appearance, and the older Glen, playing for the Northwest Territories, making his first appearance. Other family connections at the event include the Northern Ontario front end Harnden brothers E.J. and Ryan (playing for their cousin Brad Jacobs), Saskatchewan front end Marsh brothers Kevin and Daniel, the Koe brothers (Kevin, skip of Team Alberta and Jamie, skip of Northwest Territories), the Gallant brothers (Brett, second for Wild Card #1's Brad Gushue and Christopher, alternate for Prince Edward Island), and the father and son duo of Glenn and Scott Howard, the back end of team Ontario.

Draw 17 saw Ontario's Glenn Howard win his 100th career game as a skip with their win over the Yukon. He is ranked fifth all-time for wins among skips at the Brier.

Team Canada was the first team to secure a playoff spot for the six-team championship round, following their Draw 13 match against Wild Card #2 (skipped by Matt Dunstone). Brad Gushue's Wild Card #1 rink was the second team to secure a playoff spot after defeating Nova Scotia in Draw 14. Team Alberta, skipped by Kevin Koe, became the third team to secure a spot, following their win over Team Canada in Draw 15 in a "battle of Alberta". Following the final draws of pool play, Northern Ontario, skipped by Brad Jacobs clinched a spot in the playoffs after defeating Nova Scotia in their final round robin game. Tie breakers will be necessitated for the final playoff spots in both pools. Team Wild Card #2 lost their final game to Saskatchewan, skipped by Colton Flasch resulting in a re-match between those two teams for the pool A tiebreaker, and Manitoba, skipped by Mike McEwen was forced into a tiebreaker against Wild Card #3, skipped by Jason Gunnlaugson, after McEwen lost their final round robin game to Quebec.

In the Group A tiebreaker, Saskatchewan defeated Wild Card #2 (Dunstone), 9–5 in a re-match of their final round robin game, and the Saskatchewan provincial final, in which Flash won all three. In the Group B tiebreaker, Jason Gunnlaugson's Wild Card #3 team defeated their provincial rival Mike McEwen rink, representing Manitoba 9–3. With the win, Gunnlaugson advanced to the quarterfinal of the championship round to play Team Canada, while Saskatchewan advanced to play Northern Ontario. Both Alberta and Wild Card #1 (Gushue) advanced directly to the semifinals as a result of finishing first in their groups.

In the semifinals of the championship round, Saskatchewan routed Northern Ontario 10–3 and Team Canada beat Wild Card #3 (Gunnlaugson) 7–3, eliminating both Northern Ontario and Wild Card #3 from the playoffs. In the Saskatchewan–Northern Ontario game, Northern Ontario skip Brad Jacobs and his team conceded after just seven ends, and immediately left the ice in defeat. With the wins, Saskatchewan went on to play Alberta and Team Canada went on to play Wild Card #1 (Gushue) in the championship round finals. Prior to their game against Team Canada, Wild Card #1's third Mark Nichols tested positive for COVID-19, and announced he would not play for the rest of the tournament, leaving the team shorthanded with just three players, as they did not bring an alternate player to the event. Nichols began feeling unwell the night before, and continue to feel unwell the next day, experiencing "mild symptoms". The rest of the team tested negative. In the championship round finals, Team Canada beat Wild Card #1 4–3, while Alberta edged Saskatchewan 7–2. This sent Team Canada and Alberta to the 1 vs. 2 game in the page playoff round, and sent Saskatchewan and Wild Card #1 into the 3 vs. 4 game.

In the page playoff 3 vs. 4 game, Brad Gushue's shorthanded Wild Card #1 rink took on Saskatchewan, skipped by Colton Flasch. Gushue, who started the game with the hammer opened the scoring in the second end, by making a soft raise takeout for two. Flasch responded with a hit for two in the third to tie the game, and forced Gushue to one in the fourth, with Gushue drawing through a narrow port against three. In the fifth end, Saskatchewan took a 4–3 lead after Flasch made an in-off to score two. Gushue scored two in the sixth, and forced Flasch to one in the seventh. Back with the hammer, Gushue was forced to a single of his own in the eighth, after making an in-off to take a 6–5 lead. Flasch capitalized in the ninth end by scoring two more points after making a soft tap. In the final end, Gushue successfully made an angle-run back to score three points on his last rock, giving his Wild Card #1 team a 9–7 win. After the game, Gushue compared playing with just three players (third Nichols did not play due to testing positive for COVID-19) as "killing a penalty for 60 minutes (in a hockey game)". Flasch called the match a "great game" due to the shot making of both teams. The win put Gushue into the page playoff semifinal against the loser of the 1 vs. 2 game, and eliminated Saskatchewan from contention.

In the 1 vs. 2 page playoff game, Alberta, skipped by Kevin Koe, took on the defending champion Team Canada rink, skipped by Brendan Bottcher. Trailing 5–6 in the seventh end without the hammer, Bottcher missed a key triple takeout attempt, allowing Koe to score two, to go up 8–5. After the teams traded singles in the eighth and ninth ends, Koe ran Bottcher out of rocks in the 10th, giving Bottcher a single point, and beating him for a final score of 9–7. Compared to the 3 vs. 4 game, the 1 vs. 2 match was considered "definitely not a classic" by Koe, who stated the "ice got a little trickier". The win put Alberta directly in to the Brier final, and bumped Team Canada into a semifinal showdown against Brad Gushue's Wild Card #1 rink.

Brad Gushue's Wild Card #1 rink continued to roll in the semifinal, despite playing with just three players, beating Team Canada 9–3. Defence played a role early in the game, with both teams trading singles in the first two ends, and blanking the third. In the fourth, Gushue made a draw under a centre guard, forcing Bottcher to make a tap for a single to take a 2–1 lead. Bottcher was wide with a runback attempt in the fifth, allowing Gushue to draw for three. In the sixth, Bottcher was forced to take a single, after his first stone picked, but made a run back double-takeout to score one point. Bottcher came up light with his last shot in the seventh end, allowing Gushue to draw to score another three points. Gushue stole two more points in the eighth before Team Bottcher conceded the game. The win advanced Gushue to the final to play Alberta, skipped by Kevin Koe.

The final between Koe's Alberta rink and Gushue's Wild Card team started as a struggle for both teams. Gushue's normal second Brett Gallant, who was throwing stones four through six on the still shorthanded team, flashed a hit in the second end, leading to a score of two for Alberta. Alberta third B. J. Neufeld rubbed on guards on both of his shots, which led to a three-ender for Gushue in the third. After a blank end, Koe made a tap for two to take a 4–3 lead after five ends. In the sixth end, Koe missed on a triple takeout attempt, hitting just one rock, which led to a Gushue draw for three to take a 6–4 lead. In the seventh, Gushue failed to bury his rock on a hit-and-roll attempt, allowing Koe a hit for two to tie the game. Koe forced Gushue to a single in eight, but Gushue responded with a steal of one in the ninth after Koe came up short on a draw, to go up 8–6. In the tenth end, following a successful raise takeout by Gushue, Koe could only hit for two on his last shot to tie the game, forcing an extra end without hammer. In the extra end, Gushue had a hit and stay against two to win the game, and his fourth career Brier. It was the last Brier for the Koe rink, as they plan on breaking up after the season.

== Teams ==
Canada	Alberta	British Columbia
Saville SC, Edmonton Skip: Brendan Bottcher; Third: Pat Janssen; Second: Brad Thiessen; Lead: Karrick Martin (Note: Team Canada's alternate Aaron Sluchinski threw lead stones for the last end of Draw 7 and the last two ends of Draw 11.); Alternate: Aaron Sluchinski	The Glencoe Club, Calgary Skip: Kevin Koe; Third: B. J. Neufeld; Second: John Morris (Note: Team Alberta's alternate Carter Rycroft threw second stones for the last two ends of Draw 3 and lead stones for the last two ends of Draw 7.); Lead: Ben Hebert; Alternate: Carter Rycroft	Royal City CC, New Westminster Skip: Brent Pierce; Third: Jeff Richard (Note: Team British Columbia's alternate Corey Chester threw third stones for the last end of Draw 2 and second stones for the last end of Draw 4 and last four ends of Draw 16.); Second: Jared Kolomaya; Lead: Nicholas Meister; Alternate: Corey Chester
Manitoba	New Brunswick	Newfoundland and Labrador
West St. Paul CC, West St. Paul Skip: Mike McEwen; Third: Reid Carruthers; Second: Derek Samagalski (Note: Team Manitoba's alternate Kyle Doering threw second stones for the last end of Draw 2.) (Note: For the first four ends of Draw 8, Team Manitoba's alternate Kyle Doering threw lead stones, lead Colton Lott threw second stones and second Derek Samagalski sat out. For the last four ends, the team returned to their original lineup.); Lead: Colton Lott; Alternate: Kyle Doering	Gage G&CC, Oromocto Skip: James Grattan; Third: Darren Moulding; Second: Paul Dobson; Lead: Andy McCann (Note: Team New Brunswick's alternate Jamie Brannen threw lead stones for the last end of Draw 5 and during Draw 13.); Alternate: Jamie Brannen	RE/MAX Centre, St. John's Skip: Nathan Young; Third: Sam Follett; Second: Nathan Locke (Note: Team Newfoundland and Labrador's alternate Nicholas Codner threw second stones for the last two ends of Draw 3.); Lead: Ben Stringer; Alternate: Nicholas Codner
Northern Ontario	Nova Scotia	Ontario
Community First CC, Sault Ste. Marie Skip: Brad Jacobs (Note: Team Northern Ontario's alternate Jordan Chandler threw skip stones for the last end of Draw 4 and second stones for the last three ends of Draw 12.); Third: Marc Kennedy; Second: E. J. Harnden; Lead: Ryan Harnden; Alternate: Jordan Chandler	Halifax CC, Halifax Skip: Paul Flemming; Third: Scott Saccary; Second: Ryan Abraham (Note: Team Nova Scotia's alternate Kevin Ouellette threw second stones for the last three ends of Draw 16.); Lead: Phil Crowell; Alternate: Kevin Ouellette	Penetanguishene CC, Penetanguishene Skip: Glenn Howard; Third: Scott Howard; Second: David Mathers (Note: For the last end of Draw 13, Team Ontario's alternate Adam Spencer threw lead stones, lead Tim March threw second stones and second David Mathers sat out.) (Note: Team Ontario's alternate Adam Spencer threw second stones for the last three ends of Draw 17.); Lead: Tim March; Alternate: Adam Spencer
Prince Edward Island	Quebec	Saskatchewan
Crapaud Community CC, Crapaud Skip: Tyler Smith; Third: Adam Cocks (Note: Team Prince Edward Island's alternate Christopher Gallant threw lead stones for the last end of Draw 7 and third stones for the last end of Draw 17.); Second: Edward White; Lead: Ryan Lowery; Alternate: Christopher Gallant	Glenmore CC, Dollard-des-Ormeaux, CC Etchemin, Saint-Romuald & CC Valleyfield, Salaberry-de-Valleyfield Fourth: Félix Asselin; Third: Martin Crête; Skip: Mike Fournier; Lead: Jean-François Trépanier (Note: Team Quebec's alternate Steven Munroe threw lead stones for the last four ends of Draw 10.); Alternate: Steven Munroe	Nutana CC, Saskatoon Skip: Colton Flasch; Third: Catlin Schneider (Note: Team Saskatchewan's alternate Pat Simmons threw third stones for the last end of Draw 7 and second stones for the last two ends of Draw 13.); Second: Kevin Marsh; Lead: Dan Marsh; Alternate: Pat Simmons
Northwest Territories	Nunavut	Yukon
Yellowknife CC, Yellowknife Skip: Jamie Koe; Third: Glen Kennedy; Second: Cole Parsons (Note: Team Northwest Territories' alternate Tom Naugler threw second stones for the last three ends of Draw 10.); Lead: Robert Borden; Alternate: Tom Naugler	Iqaluit CC, Iqaluit Skip: Peter Mackey (Note: Team Nunavut's third Mark Pillsworth threw skip stones during Draw 16, with skip Peter Mackey throwing third.); Third: Mark Pillsworth; Second: Jeff Nadeau (Note: Team Nunavut's alternate Peter Van Strien threw lead stones for the last three ends of Draw 8 and second stones for the last three ends of Draw 12.); Lead: Greg Howard; Alternate: Peter Van Strien	Whitehorse CC, Whitehorse Skip: Thomas Scoffin; Third: Trygg Jensen; Second: Joe Wallingham; Lead: Evan Latos; Alternate: Wade Scoffin
(Newfoundland and Labrador) Wild Card #1	(Saskatchewan) Wild Card #2	(Manitoba) Wild Card #3
St. John's CC, St. John's Skip: Brad Gushue; ~~Third: Mark Nichols~~ (Note: Wild Card #1's third Mark Nichols tested positive for COVID-19 before the finals of Championship round against Team Canada, and announced he would not play for the rest of the tournament, leaving the team shorthanded with just three players, as they did not bring an alternate player to the event.); Second: Brett Gallant; Lead: Geoff Walker	Highland CC, Regina Skip: Matt Dunstone; Third: Braeden Moskowy; Second: Kirk Muyres; Lead: Dustin Kidby	Morris CC, Morris Skip: Jason Gunnlaugson; Third: Adam Casey; Second: Matt Wozniak (Note: For the last three ends of Draw 13, Team Wild Card #3's alternate Rob Gordon threw lead stones, lead Connor Njegovan threw second stones and second Matt Wozniak sat out.); Lead: Connor Njegovan; Alternate: Rob Gordon

=== CTRS ranking ===
Member Association (Skip)	Rank	Points
(Newfoundland and Labrador) Wild Card #1 (Gushue)	1	357.472
Alberta (K. Koe)	2	283.451
Northern Ontario (Jacobs)	3	250.833
Ontario (Howard)	4	188.084
(Saskatchewan) Wild Card #2 (Dunstone)	5	164.637
Manitoba (McEwen)	6	155.041
(Manitoba) Wild Card #3 (Gunnlaugson)	7	151.585
Saskatchewan (Flasch)	8	148.640
Canada (Bottcher)	9	148.332
Quebec (Fournier)	16	94.871
Nova Scotia (Flemming)	18	84.223
Newfoundland and Labrador (Young)	48	41.012
New Brunswick (Grattan)	51	39.800
British Columbia (Pierce)	53	39.145
Northwest Territories (J. Koe)	172	2.250
Prince Edward Island (Smith)	207	0.924
Nunavut (Mackey)	NR	0.000
Yukon (Scoffin)	NR	0.000

== Map of teams ==
Team Canada Provincial Winners Wild-Card Teams

== Wild card selection ==
Curling Canada included three wild card teams, continuing a process started with the 2021 Brier. The teams – skipped by Brad Gushue (Newfoundland and Labrador), Matt Dunstone (Saskatchewan) and Jason Gunnlaugson (Manitoba) – were the top three in the Canadian Team Ranking System standings who had not otherwise qualified by winning their provincial championship nor by being the reigning Team Canada champion.

CTRS standings for wild card selection
Rank	Team	Member Association	Eligibility
1	Brad Gushue	Newfoundland and Labrador	Played in Olympics (missed playdowns)
2	~~Kevin Koe~~	Alberta	Won Alberta provincials
3	~~Brad Jacobs~~	Northern Ontario	Won Northern Ontario provincials
4	~~Glenn Howard~~	Ontario	Won Ontario provincials
5	Matt Dunstone	Saskatchewan	Eliminated from provincials
6	~~Mike McEwen~~	Manitoba	Won Manitoba provincials
7	Jason Gunnlaugson	Manitoba	Eliminated from provincials

== Round robin standings ==
Final Round Robin Standings

Key
Teams to Championship Round
Teams to Tiebreakers

Pool A	Skip	W	L	PF	PA	EW	EL	BE	SE	S%	LSD
Alberta	Kevin Koe	7	1	63	36	34	26	9	10	88%	233.4
Canada	Brendan Bottcher	7	1	58	37	30	26	8	7	87%	327.5
Saskatchewan	Colton Flasch	6	2	66	41	40	26	5	12	86%	313.9
(Saskatchewan) Wild Card #2	Matt Dunstone	6	2	63	49	36	33	6	9	87%	240.9
Ontario	Glenn Howard	4	4	53	39	32	28	9	10	85%	277.5
New Brunswick	James Grattan	3	5	46	40	31	30	3	7	82%	481.6
Prince Edward Island	Tyler Smith	1	7	37	75	25	36	1	2	76%	773.1
Newfoundland and Labrador	Nathan Young	1	7	30	64	24	39	4	3	76%	815.7
Yukon	Thomas Scoffin	1	7	37	72	27	35	3	7	76%	1014.3

Pool B	Skip	W	L	PF	PA	EW	EL	BE	SE	S%	LSD
(Newfoundland and Labrador) Wild Card #1	Brad Gushue	8	0	66	36	38	27	3	10	88%	191.4
Northern Ontario	Brad Jacobs	6	2	65	31	36	23	6	11	90%	353.0
(Manitoba) Wild Card #3	Jason Gunnlaugson	5	3	58	39	34	27	7	9	85%	287.7
Manitoba	Mike McEwen	5	3	68	45	36	26	6	12	86%	489.5
British Columbia	Brent Pierce	4	4	56	55	32	33	1	7	82%	589.9
Quebec	Mike Fournier	4	4	57	55	29	36	1	4	81%	590.0
Nova Scotia	Paul Flemming	3	5	49	67	31	34	1	2	80%	567.2
Northwest Territories	Jamie Koe	1	7	35	60	26	36	4	3	77%	505.2
Nunavut	Peter Mackey	0	8	19	85	18	38	9	2	63%	1093.3

== Round robin results ==
All draw times are listed in Mountain Time (UTC−07:00).

=== Draw 1 ===
Friday, March 4, 6:30 pm

Sheet A	1	2	3	4	5	6	7	8	9	10	Final
New Brunswick (Grattan)	0	0	1	0	2	0	2	0	1	0	6
(Saskatchewan) Wild Card #2 (Dunstone) 🔨	0	1	0	1	0	3	0	0	0	2	7

Sheet B	1	2	3	4	5	6	7	8	9	10	Final
Ontario (Howard) 🔨	0	1	0	0	0	2	0	0	1	0	4
Canada (Bottcher)	0	0	2	0	1	0	0	0	0	2	5

Sheet C	1	2	3	4	5	6	7	8	9	10	11	Final
Alberta (K. Koe)	0	0	3	0	0	3	0	0	2	0	1	9
Saskatchewan (Flasch) 🔨	0	2	0	2	2	0	0	1	0	1	0	8

Sheet D	1	2	3	4	5	6	7	8	9	10	Final
Newfoundland and Labrador (Young) 🔨	1	1	0	3	0	0	0	0	2	0	7
Yukon (Scoffin)	0	0	1	0	1	1	0	1	0	1	5

=== Draw 2 ===
Saturday, March 5, 1:30 pm

Sheet A	1	2	3	4	5	6	7	8	9	10	Final
(Manitoba) Wild Card #3 (Gunnlaugson) 🔨	0	0	0	0	1	0	0	1	0	1	3
Northern Ontario (Jacobs)	0	1	0	1	0	0	1	0	2	0	5

Sheet B	1	2	3	4	5	6	7	8	9	10	Final
British Columbia (Pierce)	0	1	0	0	1	0	1	0	X	X	3
Manitoba (McEwen) 🔨	1	0	4	1	0	3	0	1	X	X	10

Sheet C	1	2	3	4	5	6	7	8	9	10	Final
Northwest Territories (J. Koe)	0	2	0	1	0	0	2	0	0	X	5
Nova Scotia (Flemming) 🔨	3	0	2	0	2	2	0	0	2	X	11

Sheet D	1	2	3	4	5	6	7	8	9	10	Final
Quebec (Fournier)	0	0	0	1	0	1	0	1	X	X	3
(Newfoundland and Labrador) Wild Card #1 (Gushue) 🔨	2	1	1	0	3	0	2	0	X	X	9

=== Draw 3 ===
Saturday, March 5, 6:30 pm

Sheet A	1	2	3	4	5	6	7	8	9	10	Final
Yukon (Scoffin)	0	4	2	2	4	0	1	0	X	X	13
Prince Edward Island (Smith) 🔨	3	0	0	0	0	2	0	2	X	X	7

Sheet B	1	2	3	4	5	6	7	8	9	10	Final
Alberta (K. Koe) 🔨	2	0	4	1	0	4	1	2	X	X	14
Newfoundland and Labrador (Young)	0	1	0	0	2	0	0	0	X	X	3

Sheet C	1	2	3	4	5	6	7	8	9	10	Final
Ontario (Howard) 🔨	0	1	0	2	0	0	2	1	0	0	6
(Saskatchewan) Wild Card #2 (Dunstone)	0	0	2	0	2	2	0	0	0	1	7

Sheet D	1	2	3	4	5	6	7	8	9	10	Final
Canada (Bottcher) 🔨	0	1	1	1	0	0	1	0	0	2	6
New Brunswick (Grattan)	0	0	0	0	2	0	0	1	1	0	4

=== Draw 4 ===
Sunday, March 6, 8:30 am

Sheet A	1	2	3	4	5	6	7	8	9	10	Final
(Newfoundland and Labrador) Wild Card #1 (Gushue) 🔨	2	3	2	0	1	0	0	0	X	X	8
Nunavut (Mackey)	0	0	0	0	0	0	0	1	X	X	1

Sheet B	1	2	3	4	5	6	7	8	9	10	Final
Northwest Territories (J. Koe) 🔨	1	0	1	0	0	1	0	1	0	X	4
Quebec (Fournier)	0	1	0	2	1	0	1	0	4	X	9

Sheet C	1	2	3	4	5	6	7	8	9	10	Final
British Columbia (Pierce)	0	2	0	1	0	0	1	0	X	X	4
Northern Ontario (Jacobs) 🔨	3	0	2	0	3	2	0	1	X	X	11

Sheet D	1	2	3	4	5	6	7	8	9	10	Final
Manitoba (McEwen) 🔨	0	2	0	2	0	0	0	2	0	X	6
(Manitoba) Wild Card #3 (Gunnlaugson)	0	0	3	0	3	1	0	0	3	X	10

=== Draw 5 ===
Sunday, March 6, 1:30 pm

Sheet A	1	2	3	4	5	6	7	8	9	10	Final
Ontario (Howard) 🔨	0	1	0	1	0	0	2	0	1	0	5
Alberta (K. Koe)	1	0	2	0	0	1	0	2	0	1	7

Sheet B	1	2	3	4	5	6	7	8	9	10	Final
(Saskatchewan) Wild Card #2 (Dunstone) 🔨	2	1	0	1	0	2	0	0	3	X	9
Yukon (Scoffin)	0	0	1	0	2	0	1	1	0	X	5

Sheet C	1	2	3	4	5	6	7	8	9	10	Final
Newfoundland and Labrador (Young)	0	2	0	1	0	1	0	0	0	X	4
New Brunswick (Grattan) 🔨	2	0	3	0	2	0	0	1	1	X	9

Sheet D	1	2	3	4	5	6	7	8	9	10	Final
Saskatchewan (Flasch) 🔨	0	2	0	2	0	0	2	3	X	X	9
Prince Edward Island (Smith)	0	0	2	0	1	0	0	0	X	X	3

=== Draw 6 ===
Sunday, March 6, 6:30 pm

Sheet A	1	2	3	4	5	6	7	8	9	10	Final
British Columbia (Pierce)	0	0	0	2	0	0	1	1	1	2	7
Northwest Territories (J. Koe) 🔨	0	1	1	0	0	1	0	0	0	0	3

Sheet B	1	2	3	4	5	6	7	8	9	10	Final
Northern Ontario (Jacobs)	0	0	2	0	1	0	1	0	2	1	7
(Newfoundland and Labrador) Wild Card #1 (Gushue) 🔨	0	1	0	3	0	3	0	1	0	0	8

Sheet C	1	2	3	4	5	6	7	8	9	10	Final
Quebec (Fournier) 🔨	1	0	0	1	0	3	0	2	0	0	7
(Manitoba) Wild Card #3 (Gunnlaugson)	0	0	2	0	2	0	2	0	2	1	9

Sheet D	1	2	3	4	5	6	7	8	9	10	Final
Nova Scotia (Flemming) 🔨	2	0	1	0	3	0	1	0	1	X	8
Nunavut (Mackey)	0	1	0	1	0	1	0	1	0	X	4

=== Draw 7 ===
Monday, March 7, 8:30 am

Sheet A	1	2	3	4	5	6	7	8	9	10	Final
(Saskatchewan) Wild Card #2 (Dunstone)	1	1	0	2	0	2	0	3	X	X	9
Newfoundland and Labrador (Young) 🔨	0	0	1	0	1	0	1	0	X	X	3

Sheet B	1	2	3	4	5	6	7	8	9	10	Final
New Brunswick (Grattan)	0	1	0	1	0	0	1	0	1	X	4
Saskatchewan (Flasch) 🔨	2	0	1	0	3	1	0	1	0	X	8

Sheet C	1	2	3	4	5	6	7	8	9	10	Final
Prince Edward Island (Smith)	1	0	0	1	0	1	0	1	X	X	4
Canada (Bottcher) 🔨	0	2	1	0	2	0	6	0	X	X	11

Sheet D	1	2	3	4	5	6	7	8	9	10	Final
Yukon (Scoffin)	0	1	0	0	1	0	0	1	X	X	3
Alberta (K. Koe) 🔨	1	0	2	1	0	4	1	0	X	X	9

=== Draw 8 ===
Monday, March 7, 1:30 pm

Sheet A	1	2	3	4	5	6	7	8	9	10	Final
Northern Ontario (Jacobs) 🔨	1	1	1	0	1	0	0	2	X	X	6
Quebec (Fournier)	0	0	0	0	0	1	0	0	X	X	1

Sheet B	1	2	3	4	5	6	7	8	9	10	11	Final
(Manitoba) Wild Card #3 (Gunnlaugson) 🔨	2	0	1	0	0	0	1	0	0	2	0	6
Nova Scotia (Flemming)	0	1	0	2	0	0	0	2	1	0	1	7

Sheet C	1	2	3	4	5	6	7	8	9	10	Final
Nunavut (Mackey)	0	0	0	0	0	0	1	0	X	X	1
Manitoba (McEwen) 🔨	2	4	1	3	2	1	0	5	X	X	18

Sheet D	1	2	3	4	5	6	7	8	9	10	Final
(Newfoundland and Labrador) Wild Card #1 (Gushue) 🔨	0	1	0	3	0	2	1	1	X	X	8
Northwest Territories (J. Koe)	0	0	1	0	2	0	0	0	X	X	3

=== Draw 9 ===
Monday, March 7, 6:30 pm

Sheet A	1	2	3	4	5	6	7	8	9	10	Final
Canada (Bottcher)	0	2	0	0	2	0	1	0	3	X	8
Saskatchewan (Flasch) 🔨	2	0	1	0	0	1	0	2	0	X	6

Sheet B	1	2	3	4	5	6	7	8	9	10	Final
Newfoundland and Labrador (Young) 🔨	1	0	1	1	0	0	0	1	0	X	4
Prince Edward Island (Smith)	0	2	0	0	2	0	1	0	1	X	6

Sheet C	1	2	3	4	5	6	7	8	9	10	Final
(Saskatchewan) Wild Card #2 (Dunstone)	1	0	0	2	0	3	0	1	1	X	8
Alberta (K. Koe) 🔨	0	2	0	0	2	0	2	0	0	X	6

Sheet D	1	2	3	4	5	6	7	8	9	10	Final
New Brunswick (Grattan) 🔨	2	0	0	1	0	0	1	0	0	0	4
Ontario (Howard)	0	2	1	0	0	0	0	1	1	0	5

=== Draw 10 ===
Tuesday, March 8, 8:30 am

Sheet A	1	2	3	4	5	6	7	8	9	10	Final
Manitoba (McEwen)	1	0	0	0	1	2	0	3	0	X	7
Nova Scotia (Flemming) 🔨	0	1	0	0	0	0	2	0	1	X	4

Sheet B	1	2	3	4	5	6	7	8	9	10	Final
Quebec (Fournier)	0	4	0	1	2	1	0	0	1	X	9
Nunavut (Mackey) 🔨	1	0	1	0	0	0	1	1	0	X	4

Sheet C	1	2	3	4	5	6	7	8	9	10	Final
Northern Ontario (Jacobs) 🔨	0	1	1	0	4	0	1	0	1	X	8
Northwest Territories (J. Koe)	0	0	0	1	0	1	0	1	0	X	3

Sheet D	1	2	3	4	5	6	7	8	9	10	Final
(Manitoba) Wild Card #3 (Gunnlaugson) 🔨	1	1	0	2	0	2	2	1	X	X	9
British Columbia (Pierce)	0	0	2	0	2	0	0	0	X	X	4

=== Draw 11 ===
Tuesday, March 8, 1:30 pm

Sheet A	1	2	3	4	5	6	7	8	9	10	Final
Alberta (K. Koe) 🔨	0	0	0	1	0	0	1	0	2	1	5
New Brunswick (Grattan)	0	0	0	0	0	1	0	1	0	0	2

Sheet B	1	2	3	4	5	6	7	8	9	10	Final
Saskatchewan (Flasch) 🔨	1	1	1	0	2	0	0	1	0	X	6
Ontario (Howard)	0	0	0	1	0	0	2	0	0	X	3

Sheet C	1	2	3	4	5	6	7	8	9	10	Final
Canada (Bottcher) 🔨	3	0	0	2	2	0	3	0	X	X	10
Yukon (Scoffin)	0	0	2	0	0	1	0	1	X	X	4

Sheet D	1	2	3	4	5	6	7	8	9	10	Final
Prince Edward Island (Smith)	0	0	1	0	4	0	0	0	1	X	6
(Saskatchewan) Wild Card #2 (Dunstone) 🔨	0	2	0	2	0	2	1	1	0	X	8

=== Draw 12 ===
Tuesday, March 8, 6:30 pm

Sheet A	1	2	3	4	5	6	7	8	9	10	Final
Northwest Territories (J. Koe)	0	0	1	0	0	1	0	0	1	X	3
(Manitoba) Wild Card #3 (Gunnlaugson) 🔨	0	1	0	2	1	0	2	0	0	X	6

Sheet B	1	2	3	4	5	6	7	8	9	10	Final
Nova Scotia (Flemming)	0	1	0	4	0	2	0	0	0	X	7
British Columbia (Pierce) 🔨	2	0	4	0	1	0	1	2	1	X	11

Sheet C	1	2	3	4	5	6	7	8	9	10	Final
Manitoba (McEwen)	0	2	0	2	0	0	1	0	1	X	6
(Newfoundland and Labrador) Wild Card #1 (Gushue) 🔨	2	0	2	0	2	1	0	2	0	X	9

Sheet D	1	2	3	4	5	6	7	8	9	10	Final
Nunavut (Mackey)	0	0	1	0	1	0	0	0	X	X	2
Northern Ontario (Jacobs) 🔨	4	3	0	4	0	0	1	0	X	X	12

=== Draw 13 ===
Wednesday, March 9, 8:30 am

Sheet A	1	2	3	4	5	6	7	8	9	10	Final
Saskatchewan (Flasch) 🔨	0	2	0	0	3	5	2	0	X	X	12
Yukon (Scoffin)	1	0	1	0	0	0	0	1	X	X	3

Sheet B	1	2	3	4	5	6	7	8	9	10	11	Final
Canada (Bottcher)	0	0	2	2	0	0	1	0	2	0	1	8
(Saskatchewan) Wild Card #2 (Dunstone) 🔨	0	2	0	0	2	0	0	2	0	1	0	7

Sheet C	1	2	3	4	5	6	7	8	9	10	Final
New Brunswick (Grattan) 🔨	2	0	2	0	3	0	1	1	X	X	9
Prince Edward Island (Smith)	0	1	0	1	0	1	0	0	X	X	3

Sheet D	1	2	3	4	5	6	7	8	9	10	Final
Ontario (Howard) 🔨	2	1	0	1	1	0	0	0	2	X	7
Newfoundland and Labrador (Young)	0	0	1	0	0	1	0	1	0	X	3

=== Draw 14 ===
Wednesday, March 9, 1:30 pm

Sheet A	1	2	3	4	5	6	7	8	9	10	Final
Nova Scotia (Flemming)	0	1	0	1	0	1	0	1	X	X	4
(Newfoundland and Labrador) Wild Card #1 (Gushue) 🔨	3	0	4	0	1	0	2	0	X	X	10

Sheet B	1	2	3	4	5	6	7	8	9	10	Final
Manitoba (McEwen) 🔨	1	0	1	0	0	2	0	3	0	1	8
Northern Ontario (Jacobs)	0	0	0	2	0	0	1	0	3	0	6

Sheet C	1	2	3	4	5	6	7	8	9	10	Final
(Manitoba) Wild Card #3 (Gunnlaugson)	3	0	0	2	1	0	0	4	X	X	10
Nunavut (Mackey) 🔨	0	0	0	0	0	0	1	0	X	X	1

Sheet D	1	2	3	4	5	6	7	8	9	10	Final
British Columbia (Pierce) 🔨	1	0	2	1	0	6	0	1	X	X	11
Quebec (Fournier)	0	2	0	0	2	0	1	0	X	X	5

=== Draw 15 ===
Wednesday, March 9, 6:30 pm

Sheet A	1	2	3	4	5	6	7	8	9	10	Final
Prince Edward Island (Smith) 🔨	2	0	0	1	0	2	0	0	X	X	5
Ontario (Howard)	0	4	2	0	3	0	1	3	X	X	13

Sheet B	1	2	3	4	5	6	7	8	9	10	Final
Yukon (Scoffin)	0	0	1	0	0	0	0	1	0	X	2
New Brunswick (Grattan) 🔨	1	0	0	1	1	2	0	0	3	X	8

Sheet C	1	2	3	4	5	6	7	8	9	10	Final
Saskatchewan (Flasch) 🔨	1	1	0	1	0	1	0	2	2	X	8
Newfoundland and Labrador (Young)	0	0	1	0	1	0	1	0	0	X	3

Sheet D	1	2	3	4	5	6	7	8	9	10	Final
Alberta (K. Koe) 🔨	2	1	0	0	0	0	0	0	0	2	5
Canada (Bottcher)	0	0	3	0	0	0	0	0	1	0	4

=== Draw 16 ===
Thursday, March 10, 8:30 am

Sheet A	1	2	3	4	5	6	7	8	9	10	Final
Nunavut (Mackey)	0	0	1	0	0	0	1	0	0	X	2
British Columbia (Pierce) 🔨	2	0	0	0	3	0	0	2	2	X	9

Sheet B	1	2	3	4	5	6	7	8	9	10	11	Final
(Newfoundland and Labrador) Wild Card #1 (Gushue)	1	0	0	1	0	0	1	0	2	0	1	6
(Manitoba) Wild Card #3 (Gunnlaugson) 🔨	0	2	0	0	0	1	0	1	0	1	0	5

Sheet C	1	2	3	4	5	6	7	8	9	10	Final
Nova Scotia (Flemming) 🔨	1	0	0	1	0	1	0	3	X	X	6
Quebec (Fournier)	0	5	4	0	2	0	3	0	X	X	14

Sheet D	1	2	3	4	5	6	7	8	9	10	Final
Northwest Territories (J. Koe) 🔨	0	0	0	1	0	1	0	1	X	X	3
Manitoba (McEwen)	1	2	0	0	1	0	3	0	X	X	7

=== Draw 17 ===
Thursday, March 10, 12:30 pm

Sheet A	1	2	3	4	5	6	7	8	9	10	Final
Newfoundland and Labrador (Young)	0	2	0	0	0	1	0	0	0	X	3
Canada (Bottcher) 🔨	3	0	2	0	0	0	0	0	1	X	6

Sheet B	1	2	3	4	5	6	7	8	9	10	Final
Prince Edward Island (Smith) 🔨	0	0	1	0	0	1	0	1	X	X	3
Alberta (K. Koe)	3	1	0	2	0	0	2	0	X	X	8

Sheet C	1	2	3	4	5	6	7	8	9	10	Final
Yukon (Scoffin)	0	1	0	0	0	1	0	0	X	X	2
Ontario (Howard) 🔨	2	0	1	4	2	0	0	1	X	X	10

Sheet D	1	2	3	4	5	6	7	8	9	10	11	Final
(Saskatchewan) Wild Card #2 (Dunstone)	0	0	0	3	0	2	1	0	0	2	0	8
Saskatchewan (Flasch) 🔨	2	1	2	0	1	0	0	1	1	0	1	9

=== Draw 18 ===
Thursday, March 10, 6:30 pm

Sheet A	1	2	3	4	5	6	7	8	9	10	Final
Quebec (Fournier) 🔨	1	0	2	0	0	0	2	0	4	X	9
Manitoba (McEwen)	0	1	0	0	2	2	0	1	0	X	6

Sheet B	1	2	3	4	5	6	7	8	9	10	Final
Nunavut (Mackey)	1	0	0	2	0	1	0	0	X	X	4
Northwest Territories (J. Koe) 🔨	0	3	1	0	1	0	2	4	X	X	11

Sheet C	1	2	3	4	5	6	7	8	9	10	Final
(Newfoundland and Labrador) Wild Card #1 (Gushue) 🔨	2	0	1	0	1	1	0	2	0	1	8
British Columbia (Pierce)	0	2	0	2	0	0	1	0	2	0	7

Sheet D	1	2	3	4	5	6	7	8	9	10	Final
Northern Ontario (Jacobs) 🔨	0	2	2	1	0	4	0	1	X	X	10
Nova Scotia (Flemming)	0	0	0	0	1	0	1	0	X	X	2

== Tiebreakers ==
Friday, March 11, 8:30 am

Sheet A	1	2	3	4	5	6	7	8	9	10	Final
Saskatchewan (Flasch) 🔨	0	2	0	2	0	1	2	0	2	X	9
(Saskatchewan) Wild Card #2 (Dunstone)	1	0	1	0	1	0	0	2	0	X	5

Player percentages
Saskatchewan		(Saskatchewan) Wild Card #2	
Dan Marsh	88%	Dustin Kidby	82%
Kevin Marsh	90%	Kirk Muyres	81%
Catlin Schneider	78%	Braeden Moskowy	81%
Colton Flasch	72%	Matt Dunstone	69%
Total	82%	Total	78%

Sheet C	1	2	3	4	5	6	7	8	9	10	Final
(Manitoba) Wild Card #3 (Gunnlaugson) 🔨	2	0	3	0	1	2	0	1	X	X	9
Manitoba (McEwen)	0	1	0	1	0	0	1	0	X	X	3

Player percentages
(Manitoba) Wild Card #3		Manitoba	
Connor Njegovan	98%	Colton Lott	92%
Matt Wozniak	86%	Derek Samagalski	84%
Adam Casey	88%	Reid Carruthers	90%
Jason Gunnlaugson	91%	Mike McEwen	63%
Total	91%	Total	82%

== Championship round ==
The winners of the Finals advance to the 1 vs. 2 game in the Page playoff, while the losers play in the 3 vs. 4 game.

Semifinals
B2	Northern Ontario	3
A3	Saskatchewan	10
A2	Canada	7
B3	(Manitoba) Wild Card #3	3

Finals
A1	Alberta	7
A3	Saskatchewan	2
B1	(Newfoundland and Labrador) Wild Card #1	3
A2	Canada	4

=== Semifinals ===
Friday, March 11, 12:30 pm

Sheet A	1	2	3	4	5	6	7	8	9	10	Final
Canada (Bottcher) 🔨	0	1	0	3	0	2	1	0	X	X	7
(Manitoba) Wild Card #3 (Gunnlaugson)	0	0	1	0	1	0	0	1	X	X	3

Player percentages
Canada		(Manitoba) Wild Card #3	
Karrick Martin	97%	Connor Njegovan	98%
Brad Thiessen	80%	Matt Wozniak	88%
Pat Janssen	95%	Adam Casey	81%
Brendan Bottcher	88%	Jason Gunnlaugson	69%
Total	90%	Total	84%

Sheet C	1	2	3	4	5	6	7	8	9	10	Final
Northern Ontario (Jacobs)	0	0	1	0	2	0	0	X	X	X	3
Saskatchewan (Flasch) 🔨	2	1	0	4	0	0	3	X	X	X	10

Player percentages
Northern Ontario		Saskatchewan	
Ryan Harnden	93%	Dan Marsh	93%
E. J. Harnden	95%	Kevin Marsh	82%
Marc Kennedy	66%	Catlin Schneider	84%
Brad Jacobs	59%	Colton Flasch	95%
Total	78%	Total	88%

=== Finals ===
Friday, March 11, 6:30 pm

Sheet C	1	2	3	4	5	6	7	8	9	10	Final
(Newfoundland and Labrador) Wild Card #1 (Gushue) 🔨	0	0	0	0	1	0	1	0	1	0	3
Canada (Bottcher)	0	0	0	0	0	1	0	2	0	1	4

Player percentages
(Newfoundland and Labrador) Wild Card #1		Canada	
Geoff Walker	91%	Karrick Martin	98%
Brett Gallant	87%	Brad Thiessen	89%
—		Pat Janssen	85%
Brad Gushue	79%	Brendan Bottcher	95%
Total	86%	Total	92%

Sheet D	1	2	3	4	5	6	7	8	9	10	Final
Alberta (K. Koe) 🔨	0	1	0	0	0	2	0	1	3	X	7
Saskatchewan (Flasch)	0	0	1	0	0	0	1	0	0	X	2

Player percentages
Alberta		Saskatchewan	
Ben Hebert	93%	Dan Marsh	90%
John Morris	88%	Kevin Marsh	60%
B. J. Neufeld	75%	Catlin Schneider	71%
Kevin Koe	96%	Colton Flasch	72%
Total	88%	Total	73%

== Playoffs ==
Page playoff system
1	Alberta	9
2	Canada	7
3	(Newfoundland and Labrador) Wild Card #1	9
4	Saskatchewan	7

Semifinal
2	Canada	3
3	(Newfoundland and Labrador) Wild Card #1	9

Final
1	Alberta	8
3	(Newfoundland and Labrador) Wild Card #1	9

=== 1 vs. 2 ===
Saturday, March 12, 6:30 pm

Sheet C	1	2	3	4	5	6	7	8	9	10	Final
Canada (Bottcher)	0	2	0	2	0	1	0	1	0	1	7
Alberta (K. Koe) 🔨	2	0	3	0	1	0	2	0	1	0	9

Player percentages
Canada		Alberta	
Karrick Martin	96%	Ben Hebert	79%
Brad Thiessen	61%	John Morris	80%
Pat Janssen	59%	B. J. Neufeld	79%
Brendan Bottcher	75%	Kevin Koe	86%
Total	73%	Total	81%

=== 3 vs. 4 ===
Saturday, March 12, 1:30 pm

Sheet B	1	2	3	4	5	6	7	8	9	10	Final
Saskatchewan (Flasch)	0	0	2	0	2	0	1	0	2	0	7
(Newfoundland and Labrador) Wild Card #1 (Gushue) 🔨	0	2	0	1	0	2	0	1	0	3	9

Player percentages
Saskatchewan		(Newfoundland and Labrador) Wild Card #1	
Dan Marsh	89%	Geoff Walker	88%
Kevin Marsh	71%	Brett Gallant	79%
Catlin Schneider	83%	—	
Colton Flasch	86%	Brad Gushue	80%
Total	82%	Total	83%

=== Semifinal ===
Sunday, March 13, 11:00 am

Sheet C	1	2	3	4	5	6	7	8	9	10	Final
Canada (Bottcher) 🔨	1	0	0	1	0	1	0	0	X	X	3
(Newfoundland and Labrador) Wild Card #1 (Gushue)	0	1	0	0	3	0	3	2	X	X	9

Player percentages
Canada		(Newfoundland and Labrador) Wild Card #1	
Karrick Martin	88%	Geoff Walker	94%
Brad Thiessen	86%	Brett Gallant	96%
Pat Janssen	73%	—	
Brendan Bottcher	69%	Brad Gushue	94%
Total	79%	Total	95%

=== Final ===
Sunday, March 13, 6:00 pm

Sheet C	1	2	3	4	5	6	7	8	9	10	11	Final
Alberta (K. Koe) 🔨	0	2	0	0	2	0	2	0	0	2	0	8
(Newfoundland and Labrador) Wild Card #1 (Gushue)	0	0	3	0	0	3	0	1	1	0	1	9

Player percentages
Alberta		(Newfoundland and Labrador) Wild Card #1	
Ben Hebert	90%	Geoff Walker	89%
John Morris	83%	Brett Gallant	82%
B. J. Neufeld	69%	—	
Kevin Koe	81%	Brad Gushue	93%
Total	81%	Total	87%

== Statistics ==
=== Top 5 player percentages ===
Final Round Robin Percentages; minimum 6 games

Key
First All-Star Team
Second All-Star Team

Leads	%
(Canada) Karrick Martin	94
(Quebec) Jean-François Trépanier	93
(Alberta) Ben Hebert	92
(Northern Ontario) Ryan Harnden	91
(Saskatchewan) Dan Marsh	91

Seconds	%
(Saskatchewan) Kevin Marsh	90
(Northern Ontario) E. J. Harnden	88
(Alberta) John Morris	88
(Canada) Brad Thiessen	87
(Manitoba) Derek Samagalski	85
WC1 Brett Gallant	85
WC3 Matt Wozniak	85
WC2 Kirk Muyres	85

Thirds	%
(Northern Ontario) Marc Kennedy	90
WC1 Mark Nichols	88
WC2 Braeden Moskowy	86
(Ontario) Scott Howard	85
(Canada) Pat Janssen	84
(Alberta) B. J. Neufeld	84
WC3 Adam Casey	84
(Saskatchewan) Catlin Schneider	84

Skips	%
WC1 Brad Gushue	90
(Northern Ontario) Brad Jacobs	90
WC2 Matt Dunstone	88
(Alberta) Kevin Koe	87
(Canada) Brendan Bottcher	85

=== Perfect games ===
Round robin and championship round only; minimum 10 shots thrown

Player	Team	Position	Shots	Opponent
Karrick Martin	Canada	Lead	20	Ontario
Mark Nichols	(Newfoundland and Labrador) Wild Card 1	Third	16	Nunavut
Dan Marsh	Saskatchewan	Lead	16	Yukon

== Awards ==
The awards and all-star teams are listed as follows:

All-Star Teams

First Team

- Skip: (Newfoundland and Labrador) Brad Gushue, Team Wild Card 1
- Third: Marc Kennedy, Northern Ontario
- Second: Kevin Marsh, Saskatchewan
- Lead: Karrick Martin, Team Canada

Second Team

- Skip: Kevin Koe, Alberta
- Third: (Newfoundland and Labrador) Mark Nichols, Team Wild Card 1
- Second: John Morris, Alberta
- Lead: Ben Hebert, Alberta

Ross Harstone Sportsmanship Award

- Scott Saccary, third, Nova Scotia

Paul McLean Award

- Phil LaPlante, TSN technical producer

Hec Gervais Most Valuable Player Award

- (Newfoundland and Labrador) Brad Gushue, skip, Team Wild Card 1

== Provincial and territorial playdowns ==
- 2022 Boston Pizza Cup (Alberta)
- (British Columbia) 2022 BC Men's Curling Championship
- 2022 Viterra Championship (Manitoba)
- 2022 New Brunswick Tankard
- 2022 Newfoundland and Labrador Tankard
- 2022 Northern Ontario Men's Provincial Curling Championship
- 2022 Deloitte Tankard (Nova Scotia) - cancelled
- 2022 Ontario Tankard
- (Prince Edward Island) 2022 PEI Tankard - cancelled
- 2022 Hardline Tankard (Quebec) - cancelled
- 2022 SaskTel Tankard (Saskatchewan)
- 2022 Northwest Territories Men's Curling Championship
- 2022 Yukon Men's Curling Championship
- 2022 Nunavut Brier Playdowns
