= Gage Golf and Curling Club =

Golf and Curling Club in Oromocto, New Brunswick

- Interactive map of Gage Golf and Curling Club
- Location: 55 Fraser Ave. Oromocto, New Brunswick, Canada; 45.8454°N 66.4943°W

Information
- Established: 1950 (golf)
- Club type: Dedicated Ice
- Curling Canada region: New Brunswick Curling Association
- Sheets of ice: 4
- Rock colours: Red and Blue
- Website: gagecurling.com

The Gage Golf and Curling Club (French: Club de Golf et Curling Gage) is a golf and curling club located at CFB Gagetown in Oromocto, New Brunswick.

== History ==
The golf club was built in 1950 and was designed by C. E. Robbie Robinson.

In 2016, the golf course was damaged when someone drove onto the course, leaving behind empty beer cans in the process.

== Provincial champions (curling) ==
The curling club made news in 2020 when it sent a team to the Brier, the Scotties Tournament of Hearts and a junior mixed doubles event in Sweden.

=== Men's ===
Winners of the New Brunswick Tankard:

Year	Team	Brier record
2006	James Grattan, Wayne Tallon, Jason Vaughan, Jeff Lacey	5–6
2008	James Grattan, Mike Kennedy, Jason Vaughan, Peter Case	2–9
2009	Russ Howard, James Grattan, Steven Howard, Peter Case, Jason Vaughan	6–5
2010	James Grattan, Steven Howard, Jason Vaughan, Peter Case	3–8
2011	James Grattan, Charlie Sullivan, Steven Howard, Peter Case	4–7
2013	James Grattan, Jason Roach, Darren Roach, Peter Case	5–6
2014	James Grattan, Jason Roach, Darren Roach, Josh Barry	6–5
2018	James Grattan, Chris Jeffrey, Andy McCann, Peter Case	3–5
2020	James Grattan, Paul Dobson, Andy McCann, Jamie Brannen, Chris Jeffrey	3–4
2021 (Note: No Tankard held that year due to the COVID-19 pandemic in New Brunswick. Team selected to represent New Brunswick at the Brier.)	James Grattan, Jonathan Beuk, Andy McCann, Jamie Brannen, Kevin Keefe	4–4
2022	James Grattan, Darren Moulding, Paul Dobson, Andy McCann, Jamie Brannen	3–5
2024	James Grattan, Joel Krats, Paul Dobson, Andy McCann	1–7
2025	James Grattan, Joel Krats, Paul Dobson, Andy McCann	3–5

=== Women's ===
Winners of the New Brunswick Scotties Tournament of Hearts:

Year	Team	Hearts record
2011	Andrea Kelly, Denise Nowlan, Jillian Babin, Lianne Sobey	3–8
2012	Andrea Kelly, Rebecca Atkinson (skip), Jillian Babin, Jodie deSolla	5–6
2013	Andrea Crawford, Rebecca Atkinson, Danielle Parsons, Jodie deSolla	6–5
2014	Andrea Crawford, Rebecca Atkinson, Danielle Parsons, Jodie deSolla	6–5
2020	Andrea Crawford, Jennifer Armstrong, Jillian Babin, Katie Forward	4–4

=== Mixed ===
Year	Team	Canadian Mixed record
2012	James Grattan, Rebecca Atkinson, Kevin Boyle, Jane Boyle	7–4 (2013)
2019	Chris Jeffrey, Jillian Keough, Brian King, Katie Forward	5–4

=== Junior men's ===
Year	Team	Canadian Juniors record
2025	Rajan Dalrymple, Noah Riggs, Drew Grattan, Cameron Sallaj	8–2

=== Junior women's ===
Year	Team	Canadian Juniors record
2022	Celia Evans, Brooke Tracy, Julia Evans, Sierra Tracy	5–4

=== Curling Club championships ===
The club won the Canadian Curling Club Championships in 2023, when Abby Burgess and her rink of Brooke Tracy, Samantha Crook and Hannah Williams won the women's event. The team went on to win the 2024 North American Curling Club Championship representing Canada. They defeated the United States team from the Madison Curling Club.

Year	Team	Canadian Club Championships record
2018 (men's)	Trevor Hanson, Chris Jenkins, Jeff Rankin, Chris Cogswell	2–4
2023 (women's)	Abby Burgess, Brooke Tracy, Samantha Crook, Hannah Williams	8–2
2026 (men's)	James Grattan, Matt Munro, Alex Peasley, Eric LeClair, Dean Grattan	
