= Kevin Keefe =

Canadian curler

- Curler
- Born: April 30, 1967 (age 59); Moncton, New Brunswick

Team
- Curling club: Capital Winter Club, Fredericton, NB

Curling career
- Member Association: New Brunswick
- Brier: 2 (1998, 2021)
- Top CTRS ranking: 233rd (2019–20)

Kevin Keefe (born April 30, 1967, in Moncton, New Brunswick) is a Canadian curler from Fredericton, New Brunswick. He represented New Brunswick at two Tim Hortons Brier's in 1998 and 2021.

== Career ==
Keefe won the 1998 New Brunswick Tankard as lead for Terry Odishaw. His team of Odishaw, Tommy Sullivan and Mark Dobson represented New Brunswick at the 1998 Labatt Brier in Winnipeg, Manitoba where they finished with a 4–7 record. Four years later, he played in the 2003 Canadian Mixed Curling Championship as second for Wayne Tallon, finishing with a 6–6 record.

Keefe was selected to be Team James Grattan's alternate at the 2021 Tim Hortons Brier in Calgary, Alberta. There, they finished with a 4–4 record.

== Personal life ==
Keefe works as a business development manager at Capital Foodservice. He has three children, Emma, Danielle and Katherine.

== Teams ==
Season	Skip	Third	Second	Lead
1997–98	Terry Odishaw	Tommy Sullivan	Mark Dobson	Kevin Keefe
1998–99	Terry Odishaw	Tommy Sullivan	Mark Dobson	Kevin Keefe
2000–01	Terry Odishaw	Dave Nowlan	Daryell Nowlan	Kevin Keefe
2010–11	Jamie Brannen	Geoff Porter	Ryan Porter	Kevin Keefe
2018–19	Kevin Keefe	Scott Archibald	Jared McGinn	Steve Christie
2019–20	Ryan Cain	Scott Archibald	Kevin Keefe	Mike Flannery Jr.
