= Jamie Brannen =

Canadian curler (1975–2022)

- Curler
- Born: September 2, 1975; Windsor, Nova Scotia, Canada
- Died: September 23, 2022 (aged 47); Upper Kingsclear, New Brunswick

Team
- Curling club: Capital Winter Club, Fredericton, NB

Curling career
- Member Association: New Brunswick
- Brier: 6 (2016, 2017, 2019, 2020, 2021, 2022)

Jamie Robert Alexander Brannen (September 2, 1975 – September 23, 2022) was a Canadian curler and a six-time New Brunswick Tankard champion.

== Early life ==
Brannen was born in Windsor, Nova Scotia, the son of Robert Brannen and Cindy Clark Murray. He grew up in Chipman, New Brunswick and graduated from the University of New Brunswick with a degree in Computer Science.

== Curling career ==
Brannen won the 2007 New Brunswick Mixed Championship with teammates Heather Munn, Nick Munn and wife Lesley Hicks. The team represented New Brunswick at the 2008 Canadian Mixed Curling Championship, where he skipped the team to a 4–7 record.

Brannen won his first New Brunswick Tankard in 2016 as lead for Mike Kennedy with teammates Scott Jones and Marc LeCocq where they went a perfect 8–0. At the 2016 Tim Hortons Brier in Ottawa, the team finished in tenth place with a 3–8 record. The next season the team defended their provincial title and finished 1–10 at the 2017 Tim Hortons Brier. The following season, Kennedy and LeCocq left the team and Jones moved up to skip with Brian King and Robert Daley joining the team at second and lead respectively. The team finished 3–4 at the 2018 Papa John's Pizza Tankard, failing to qualify for the playoffs. The team lost the semifinal the following season at the 2019 NB Tankard to James Grattan. He was the alternate for Terry Odishaw and Team New Brunswick at the 2019 Tim Hortons Brier and the team finished with a 3–4 record. Brannen left the Jones team and joined Grattan for the 2019–20 season. On the tour, they picked up a win at the Jim Sullivan Curling Classic and played in the 2019 Tour Challenge Tier 2, finishing 1–3. Later that season, the team won the 2020 New Brunswick Tankard and represented New Brunswick at the 2020 Tim Hortons Brier in Kingston, Ontario. After starting 1–2, they upset higher seeds Ontario's John Epping and British Columbia's Steve Laycock to sit in a good spot going into their final two games. Unfortunately, they would lose both of those games, finishing the round robin at 3–4, missing the playoffs.

Due to the COVID-19 pandemic in New Brunswick, the 2021 provincial championship was cancelled. As the reigning provincial champions, Team Grattan was invited to represent New Brunswick at the 2021 Tim Hortons Brier, which they accepted. One member of Team Grattan, Paul Dobson, opted not to attend the event due to travel restrictions. He was replaced by Jonathan Beuk of Ontario. At the Brier, the Grattan rink had a strong start, defeating higher seeds Mike McEwen and Brad Jacobs to sit at 4–1 with three games left. They then, however, lost their last three games, just failing to qualify for the championship pool, like in 2020.

Brannen was a member of the New Brunswick team at the 2021 Canadian Mixed Curling Championship, playing second on a team skipped by Grattan. The team went on to have a 7–3 record, but lost both their playoff games, including the bronze medal game against the Northwest Territories.

During the 2021–22 curling season, Team Grattan picked up Darren Moulding to play third for this team, after Moulding had been cut from the defending Brier champion Brendan Bottcher rink. This meant that the team would have five players. After winning the 2022 New Brunswick Tankard, the team represented the province at the 2022 Tim Hortons Brier. At the Brier, Brannen would be the team's alternate, and only played in two games. The team finished the Brier with a 3–5 record.

== Personal life ==
Brannen was married to Lesley Hicks Brannen and had two children. He was the executive director of Brannen Consulting.

On September 24, 2022 it was announced that Brannen, along with his father Bob, had died that weekend.

== Teams ==
Season	Skip	Third	Second	Lead
2009–10	Jamie Brannen	Zach Eldridge	Ronnie Burgess	Nicholas Dunn
2010–11	Jamie Brannen	Geoff Porter	Ryan Porter	Kevin Keefe
2011–12	Mike Kennedy (Fourth)	Marc LeCocq (Skip)	Jamie Brannen	Dave Konefal
2012–13	Mike Kennedy (Fourth)	Marc LeCocq (Skip)	Jamie Brannen	Dave Konefal
2013–14	Marc LeCocq	Andy McCann	Scott Jones	Jamie Brannen
2014–15	Andy McCann	Marc LeCocq	Scott Jones	Jamie Brannen
2015–16	Mike Kennedy	Scott Jones	Marc LeCocq	Jamie Brannen
2016–17	Mike Kennedy	Scott Jones	Marc LeCocq	Jamie Brannen
2017–18	Scott Jones	Jamie Brannen	Brian King	Robert Daley
2018–19	Scott Jones	Jamie Brannen	Brian King	Robert Daley
2019–20	James Grattan	Paul Dobson	Andy McCann	Jamie Brannen
2020–21	James Grattan	Paul Dobson	Andy McCann	Jamie Brannen
2021–22	James Grattan	Darren Moulding	Paul Dobson	Andy McCann / Jamie Brannen
