= 2021 Tim Hortons Brier =

2021 Canadian national men's curling championship

- Host city: Calgary, Alberta
- Arena: Markin MacPhail Centre, Canada Olympic Park
- Dates: March 5–14
- Attendance: 0 (behind closed doors)
- Winner: Alberta
- Curling club: Saville Community SC, Edmonton
- Skip: Brendan Bottcher
- Third: Darren Moulding
- Second: Brad Thiessen
- Lead: Karrick Martin
- Alternate: Pat Janssen
- Coach: Don Bartlett
- Finalist: (Alberta) Wild Card 2 (Kevin Koe)

The 2021 Tim Hortons Brier, Canada's national men's curling championship, was held from March 5 to 14 at the Markin MacPhail Centre at Canada Olympic Park in Calgary, Alberta.

In the final, Team Alberta, skipped by Brendan Bottcher defeated Team Wild Card 2, skipped by Kevin Koe in an all-Alberta final, and a re-match of the 2019 Brier final. It was Bottcher's first Brier championship after losing the previous three finals. The first six ends of the final were evenly matched with Koe leading 1–0 heading into the seventh end. In the seventh, Koe's first rock picked, and he missed a double on his second shot, allowing Bottcher a draw for three, to go up 3–1. The two teams exchanged singles in the 8th and 9th ends, and in the 10th end, with just 30 seconds left on their time clock, Koe conceded with one rock left, as his team had no possibilities to score two points to tie the game. As champions, Bottcher and his team went on to represent Canada at the 2021 World Men's Curling Championship, where they finished in sixth place.

The event was originally scheduled to be held in Kelowna, British Columbia. Due to the COVID-19 pandemic in Canada, it was announced that most Curling Canada championships still being held in the 2020–21 curling season (including the World Men's Curling Championship, which will be held at the same site) would be moved to a centralized "bubble" (similar to that of the NHL as in Edmonton) at Canada Olympic Park. All events will be held behind closed doors with no spectators admitted. In addition, due to COVID-19 restrictions and logistics, many provincial playdowns have been cancelled, with teams being selected by their respective member association instead.

When Ontario played Newfoundland and Labrador in Draw 11, it marked the first time that two openly LGBTQ skips (John Epping and Greg Smith respectively) played against each other at the Brier.

== Teams ==
Canada	Alberta	British Columbia
St. John's CC, St. John's Skip: Brad Gushue; Third: Mark Nichols (Note: For the last end of Draw 20, Team Canada's alternate Ryan McNeil Lamswood threw second stones, second Brett Gallant threw third stones and third Mark Nichols sat out.); Second: Brett Gallant (Note: Team Canada's alternate Ryan McNeil Lamswood threw second stones for the last two ends of Draw 15 and the last three ends of Draw 17.); Lead: Geoff Walker; Alternate: Ryan McNeil Lamswood	Saville SC, Edmonton Skip: Brendan Bottcher; Third: Darren Moulding; Second: Brad Thiessen; Lead: Karrick Martin (Note: Team Alberta's alternate Pat Janssen threw lead stones for the last three ends of Draw 4.); Alternate: Pat Janssen	Vernon CC, Vernon Skip: Jim Cotter (Note: Steve Laycock skipped Team British Columbia’s first two games, and Jim Cotter skipped the rest. Cotter threw fourth rocks for all games.); Third: Steve Laycock; Second: Andrew Nerpin (Note: Team British Columbia's alternate Tyler Tardi threw second stones for the last end of Draw 8 and lead stones during Draw 18.); Lead: Rick Sawatsky; Alternate: Tyler Tardi
Manitoba	New Brunswick	Newfoundland and Labrador
Morris CC, Morris Skip: Jason Gunnlaugson; Third: Adam Casey; Second: Matt Wozniak (Note: Team Manitoba's alternate Jacques Gauthier threw lead stones for the last end of Draw 4 and second stones for the last two ends of Draw 20.); Lead: Connor Njegovan; Alternate: Jacques Gauthier	Gage Golf & CC, Oromocto Skip: James Grattan; Third: Jonathan Beuk; Second: Andy McCann; Lead: Jamie Brannen (Note: Team New Brunswick's alternate Kevin Keefe threw lead stones for the last two ends of Draw 10.); Alternate: Kevin Keefe	St. John's CC, St. John's Skip: Greg Smith; Third: Greg Blyde (Note: Team Newfoundland and Labrador's alternate Adam Boland threw third stones for the last four ends of Draw 7 and lead stones for the last end of Draw 13.); Second: Alex McDonah; Lead: Evan McDonah; Alternate: Adam Boland
Northern Ontario	Nova Scotia	Ontario
Community First CC, Sault Ste. Marie Skip: Brad Jacobs; Third: Marc Kennedy; Second: E.J. Harnden; Lead: Ryan Harnden (Note: Team Northern Ontario's alternate Lee Toner threw lead stones for the last end of Draw 2.); Alternate: Lee Toner	Halifax CC, Halifax Skip: Scott McDonald (Note: Scott McDonald is skipping the Jamie Murphy rink, as Murphy has decided to stay home due to work and family priorities.); Third: Paul Flemming (Note: For the last four ends of Draw 15, Team Nova Scotia's alternate Kevin Ouellette threw second stones, second Scott Saccary threw third stones and third Paul Flemming sat out.); Second: Scott Saccary; Lead: Phil Crowell; Alternate: Kevin Ouellette	Leaside CC, Toronto Skip: John Epping; Third: Ryan Fry; Second: Mat Camm; Lead: Brent Laing
Prince Edward Island	Quebec	Saskatchewan
Crapaud Community CC, Crapaud & Montague CC, Montague Skip: Eddie MacKenzie (Note: For the last four ends of Draw 5, Team Prince Edward Island's alternate Aaron Bartling threw third stones, third Tyler Smith threw skip stones and skip Eddie MacKenzie sat out. They also used this lineup during Draw 13.); Third: Tyler Smith; Second: Sean Ledgerwood (Note: Team Prince Edward Island's alternate Aaron Bartling threw second stones during Draw 15.); Lead: Ryan Lowery; Alternate: Aaron Bartling	Glenmore CC, Dollard-des-Ormeaux, CC Etchemin, Saint-Romuald & CC Valleyfield, Salaberry-de-Valleyfield Skip: Mike Fournier; Third: Martin Crête; Second: Félix Asselin (Note: Team Quebec's alternate William Dion threw second stones for the last four ends of Draw 5.); Lead: Jean-François Trépanier; Alternate: William Dion	Wadena Re/Max CC, Wadena Skip: Matt Dunstone; Third: Braeden Moskowy; Second: Kirk Muyres; Lead: Dustin Kidby
Northwest Territories	Nunavut	Yukon
Yellowknife CC, Yellowknife (Note: For the last three ends of Draw 16, Team Northwest Territories's alternate David Aho threw second stones, second Brad Patzer threw third stones, third Tom Naugler threw skip stones and skip Greg Skauge sat out.) Skip: Greg Skauge; Third: Tom Naugler; Second: Brad Patzer; Lead: Robert Borden (Note: Team Northwest Territories's alternate David Aho threw lead stones for the last two ends of Draw 4.); Alternate: David Aho	Iqaluit CC, Iqaluit (Note: Team Nunavut used a five-player rotation between all positions.) Skip: Peter Mackey; Third: Jeff Nadeau; Second: Greg Howard; Lead: Jeff Chown; Alternate: Brady St. Louis	Whitehorse CC, Whitehorse Skip: Dustin Mikkelsen; Third: Alexx Peech (Note: Team Yukon's alternate Ray Mikkelsen threw third stones during Draw 10.); Second: Brandon Hagen; Lead: Robert Mckinnon; Alternate: Ray Mikkelsen
(Manitoba) Wild Card #1	(Alberta) Wild Card #2	(Ontario) Wild Card #3
West St. Paul CC, West St. Paul Skip: Mike McEwen; Third: Reid Carruthers; Second: Derek Samagalski; Lead: Colin Hodgson	The Glencoe Club, Calgary Skip: Kevin Koe; Third: B.J. Neufeld; Second: John Morris; Lead: Ben Hebert (Note: Wild Card #2 alternate Mike Caione threw lead stones for the last three ends of Draw 9.); Alternate: Mike Caione	Penetanguishene CC, Penetanguishene Skip: Glenn Howard (Note: Wild Card #3's alternate Wayne Middaugh threw skip stones for the tournament as Glenn Howard was injured.) (Note: Wild Card #3 regular skip Glenn Howard threw lead stones for the last two ends of Draw 6.) (injured); Third: Scott Howard; Second: David Mathers; Lead: Tim March; Alternate: Wayne Middaugh

=== CTRS ranking ===
As of the 2019–20 season, where at least three out of four players remained on the same team for the 2020–21 season.

Member Association (Skip)	Rank	Points
Northern Ontario (Jacobs)	1	483.766
Ontario (Epping)	2	445.311
Canada (Gushue)	3	395.747
Alberta (Bottcher)	4	347.977
(Manitoba) Wild Card #1 (McEwen)	5	317.716
(Alberta) Wild Card #2 (Koe)	6	277.610
Saskatchewan (Dunstone)	7	254.711
Manitoba (Gunnlaugson)	8	236.888
(Ontario) Wild Card #3 (Howard)	9	184.546
Nova Scotia (Murphy)	18	121.284
Quebec (Fournier)	19	118.324
British Columbia (Cotter)	22	101.956
New Brunswick (Grattan)	39	68.637
Newfoundland and Labrador (Smith)	162	7.470
Northwest Territories (Skauge)	NR	0.000
Nunavut (Mackey)	NR	0.000
Prince Edward Island (MacKenzie)	NR	0.000
Yukon (Mikkelsen)	NR	0.000

== Map of teams ==
Team Canada Provincial Winners Wild-Card Teams

== Wild card selection ==
In previous years, a wild card game was played between the top two teams on the Canadian Team Ranking System standings who did not win their provincial championship; the winner of this game was usually granted the final spot in the tournament. However, with many provinces cancelling their provincial championships due to the ongoing COVID-19 pandemic in Canada, thus not allowing many teams to compete for a chance to play at the Brier, Curling Canada opted to include three wild card teams instead of the usual one. These teams directly qualified and did not participate in a play-in game.

For selection, teams must have 3 of 4 returning players from the previous season.

CTRS standings for wild card selection
Rank	Team	Member Association	Eligibility
1	~~Brad Jacobs~~	Northern Ontario	Named provincial representative
2	~~John Epping~~	Ontario	Named provincial representative
3	~~Brad Gushue~~	Newfoundland and Labrador	Brier returning champion
4	~~Brendan Bottcher~~	Alberta	Named provincial representative
5	Mike McEwen	Manitoba	Was not named provincial representative
6	Kevin Koe	Alberta	Was not named provincial representative
7	~~Matt Dunstone~~	Saskatchewan	Named provincial representative
8	~~Jason Gunnlaugson~~	Manitoba	Named provincial representative
9	Glenn Howard	Ontario	Was not named provincial representative

== Round-robin standings ==
Final round-robin standings

Key
Teams to Championship pool

Pool A	Skip	W	L	PF	PA	EW	EL	BE	SE	S%
(Ontario) Wild Card #3	Wayne Middaugh	7	1	54	36	32	26	12	5	84%
Alberta	Brendan Bottcher	6	2	60	35	32	29	6	6	88%
Northern Ontario	Brad Jacobs	5	3	53	43	34	31	8	8	84%
Manitoba	Jason Gunnlaugson	5	3	45	37	26	28	12	6	85%
New Brunswick	James Grattan	4	4	49	48	35	36	2	9	80%
(Manitoba) Wild Card #1	Mike McEwen	4	4	60	46	37	28	1	14	84%
British Columbia	Jim Cotter	3	5	53	47	34	32	4	6	81%
Northwest Territories	Greg Skauge	2	6	46	69	31	37	2	7	77%
Yukon	Dustin Mikkelsen	0	8	24	83	22	36	4	3	67%

Pool B	Skip	W	L	PF	PA	EW	EL	BE	SE	S%
(Alberta) Wild Card #2	Kevin Koe	7	1	68	41	36	29	1	13	87%
Canada	Brad Gushue	6	2	65	39	38	26	7	10	88%
Ontario	John Epping	6	2	69	38	36	25	3	13	84%
Saskatchewan	Matt Dunstone	6	2	53	41	30	30	5	6	85%
Nova Scotia	Scott McDonald	4	4	67	49	36	30	3	14	82%
Quebec	Mike Fournier	4	4	66	57	39	31	2	18	83%
Newfoundland and Labrador	Greg Smith	2	6	46	60	30	36	2	6	72%
Prince Edward Island	Eddie MacKenzie	1	7	40	72	26	40	0	3	75%
Nunavut	Peter Mackey	0	8	16	89	15	39	11	1	62%

== Round-robin results ==
All draw times are listed in Mountain Standard Time (UTC−07:00).

=== Draw 1 ===
Friday, March 5, 6:30 pm

Sheet A	1	2	3	4	5	6	7	8	9	10	Final
Nunavut (Mackey)	0	1	0	0	0	0	0	1	X	X	2
Saskatchewan (Dunstone) 🔨	2	0	5	2	0	0	1	0	X	X	10

Sheet B	1	2	3	4	5	6	7	8	9	10	Final
(Alberta) Wild Card #2 (Koe) 🔨	2	1	0	1	1	0	2	0	0	X	7
Nova Scotia (Murphy)	0	0	1	0	0	2	0	0	1	X	4

Sheet C	1	2	3	4	5	6	7	8	9	10	Final
Quebec (Fournier) 🔨	0	2	1	0	1	0	2	0	1	0	7
Newfoundland and Labrador (Smith)	0	0	0	3	0	1	0	1	0	1	6

Sheet D	1	2	3	4	5	6	7	8	9	10	Final
Ontario (Epping)	0	0	0	0	1	0	0	1	0	X	2
Canada (Gushue) 🔨	0	0	0	2	0	2	1	0	1	X	6

=== Draw 2 ===
Saturday, March 6, 8:30 am

Sheet A	1	2	3	4	5	6	7	8	9	10	Final
(Ontario) Wild Card #3 (Howard) 🔨	0	3	0	2	0	1	0	0	3	X	9
Northwest Territories (Skauge)	0	0	2	0	1	0	0	2	0	X	5

Sheet B	1	2	3	4	5	6	7	8	9	10	Final
(Manitoba) Wild Card #1 (McEwen) 🔨	1	0	0	0	1	0	0	0	1	X	3
New Brunswick (Grattan)	0	0	1	1	0	2	1	1	0	X	6

Sheet C	1	2	3	4	5	6	7	8	9	10	Final
Yukon (Mikkelsen)	0	1	0	1	0	0	0	1	X	X	3
Northern Ontario (Jacobs) 🔨	4	0	3	0	3	1	0	0	X	X	11

Sheet D	1	2	3	4	5	6	7	8	9	10	Final
Alberta (Bottcher)	0	0	0	0	0	2	0	0	2	0	4
Manitoba (Gunnlaugson) 🔨	0	0	0	0	1	0	1	1	0	2	5

=== Draw 3 ===
Saturday, March 6, 1:30 pm

Sheet A	1	2	3	4	5	6	7	8	9	10	Final
(Alberta) Wild Card #2 (Koe)	0	2	1	1	0	0	2	0	0	1	7
Newfoundland and Labrador (Smith) 🔨	2	0	0	0	2	1	0	0	1	0	6

Sheet B	1	2	3	4	5	6	7	8	9	10	Final
Quebec (Fournier)	1	0	2	0	2	1	0	1	0	0	7
Canada (Gushue) 🔨	0	2	0	3	0	0	2	0	3	1	11

Sheet C	1	2	3	4	5	6	7	8	9	10	Final
Saskatchewan (Dunstone) 🔨	0	1	0	0	0	2	0	0	0	0	3
Ontario (Epping)	0	0	0	0	1	0	1	1	1	2	6

Sheet D	1	2	3	4	5	6	7	8	9	10	Final
Nova Scotia (Murphy) 🔨	2	0	2	1	4	0	2	0	X	X	11
Prince Edward Island (MacKenzie)	0	1	0	0	0	1	0	2	X	X	4

=== Draw 4 ===
Saturday, March 6, 6:30 pm

Sheet A	1	2	3	4	5	6	7	8	9	10	Final
(Manitoba) Wild Card #1 (McEwen)	0	1	0	1	1	0	2	2	0	1	8
Northern Ontario (Jacobs) 🔨	1	0	2	0	0	2	0	0	0	0	5

Sheet B	1	2	3	4	5	6	7	8	9	10	Final
Yukon (Mikkelsen)	0	0	2	1	0	1	0	1	X	X	5
Manitoba (Gunnlaugson) 🔨	0	2	0	0	4	0	3	0	X	X	9

Sheet C	1	2	3	4	5	6	7	8	9	10	Final
Northwest Territories (Skauge)	0	1	0	1	0	1	2	0	X	X	5
Alberta (Bottcher) 🔨	3	0	2	0	4	0	0	4	X	X	13

Sheet D	1	2	3	4	5	6	7	8	9	10	Final
New Brunswick (Grattan) 🔨	1	0	0	0	1	2	0	1	0	2	7
British Columbia (Laycock)	0	0	1	1	0	0	2	0	1	0	5

=== Draw 5 ===
Sunday, March 7, 8:30 am

Sheet A	1	2	3	4	5	6	7	8	9	10	Final
Ontario (Epping) 🔨	0	3	0	0	3	0	0	1	0	5	12
Nova Scotia (Murphy)	3	0	1	1	0	0	1	0	1	0	7

Sheet B	1	2	3	4	5	6	7	8	9	10	Final
Newfoundland and Labrador (Smith)	0	1	0	0	1	0	0	0	1	X	3
Saskatchewan (Dunstone) 🔨	2	0	2	0	0	0	0	2	0	X	6

Sheet C	1	2	3	4	5	6	7	8	9	10	Final
(Alberta) Wild Card #2 (Koe) 🔨	1	3	0	4	0	3	0	1	X	X	12
Prince Edward Island (MacKenzie)	0	0	1	0	2	0	2	0	X	X	5

Sheet D	1	2	3	4	5	6	7	8	9	10	Final
Nunavut (Mackey)	0	0	0	0	0	0	1	0	X	X	1
Quebec (Fournier) 🔨	3	2	2	2	2	2	0	2	X	X	15

=== Draw 6 ===
Sunday, March 7, 1:30 pm

Sheet A	1	2	3	4	5	6	7	8	9	10	11	Final
Alberta (Bottcher) 🔨	2	0	0	0	1	0	0	1	1	0	1	6
New Brunswick (Grattan)	0	1	0	0	0	1	1	0	0	2	0	5

Sheet B	1	2	3	4	5	6	7	8	9	10	Final
Northern Ontario (Jacobs)	0	0	1	1	0	2	0	2	1	X	7
Northwest Territories (Skauge) 🔨	1	1	0	0	2	0	1	0	0	X	5

Sheet C	1	2	3	4	5	6	7	8	9	10	Final
(Manitoba) Wild Card #1 (McEwen) 🔨	2	0	2	1	0	2	0	2	0	1	10
British Columbia (Laycock)	0	3	0	0	1	0	1	0	2	0	7

Sheet D	1	2	3	4	5	6	7	8	9	10	Final
(Ontario) Wild Card #3 (Howard) 🔨	3	0	2	1	0	4	2	0	X	X	12
Yukon (Mikkelsen)	0	0	0	0	1	0	0	1	X	X	2

=== Draw 7 ===
Sunday, March 7, 6:30 pm

Sheet A	1	2	3	4	5	6	7	8	9	10	Final
Prince Edward Island (MacKenzie)	0	1	0	3	0	0	0	0	X	X	4
Quebec (Fournier) 🔨	1	0	4	0	2	1	1	1	X	X	10

Sheet B	1	2	3	4	5	6	7	8	9	10	Final
Ontario (Epping) 🔨	2	2	3	3	0	2	0	4	X	X	16
Nunavut (Mackey)	0	0	0	0	0	0	1	0	X	X	1

Sheet C	1	2	3	4	5	6	7	8	9	10	Final
Newfoundland and Labrador (Smith) 🔨	1	0	0	0	0	2	1	0	0	X	4
Nova Scotia (Murphy)	0	2	1	2	2	0	0	2	2	X	11

Sheet D	1	2	3	4	5	6	7	8	9	10	Final
Canada (Gushue) 🔨	2	0	0	1	0	0	2	0	2	0	7
(Alberta) Wild Card #2 (Koe)	0	3	0	0	0	2	0	1	0	3	9

=== Draw 8 ===
Monday, March 8, 1:30 pm

Sheet A	1	2	3	4	5	6	7	8	9	10	Final
British Columbia (Cotter) 🔨	0	2	0	0	2	0	4	1	X	X	9
Yukon (Mikkelsen)	0	0	0	1	0	1	0	0	X	X	2

Sheet B	1	2	3	4	5	6	7	8	9	10	Final
Alberta (Bottcher) 🔨	0	0	1	0	2	0	1	1	0	X	5
(Ontario) Wild Card #3 (Howard)	0	0	0	1	0	1	0	0	1	X	3

Sheet C	1	2	3	4	5	6	7	8	9	10	11	Final
Northern Ontario (Jacobs) 🔨	2	0	0	0	1	0	1	0	1	1	0	6
New Brunswick (Grattan)	0	1	0	0	0	4	0	1	0	0	1	7

Sheet D	1	2	3	4	5	6	7	8	9	10	Final
Manitoba (Gunnlaugson)	0	1	0	0	2	0	0	4	1	X	8
(Manitoba) Wild Card #1 (McEwen) 🔨	1	0	2	0	0	0	2	0	0	X	5

=== Draw 9 ===
Monday, March 8, 6:30 pm

Sheet A	1	2	3	4	5	6	7	8	9	10	Final
Saskatchewan (Dunstone)	0	0	1	0	2	0	2	0	0	1	6
Canada (Gushue) 🔨	0	1	0	0	0	2	0	1	1	0	5

Sheet B	1	2	3	4	5	6	7	8	9	10	Final
Nova Scotia (Murphy) 🔨	0	2	0	1	0	0	4	0	1	1	9
Quebec (Fournier)	2	0	0	0	1	1	0	2	0	0	6

Sheet C	1	2	3	4	5	6	7	8	9	10	Final
Nunavut (Mackey)	0	1	0	0	0	1	0	1	X	X	3
(Alberta) Wild Card #2 (Koe) 🔨	6	0	3	1	0	0	1	0	X	X	11

Sheet D	1	2	3	4	5	6	7	8	9	10	Final
Prince Edward Island (MacKenzie)	0	2	0	0	1	0	1	1	2	0	7
Newfoundland and Labrador (Smith) 🔨	2	0	3	2	0	1	0	0	0	3	11

=== Draw 10 ===
Tuesday, March 9, 8:30 am

Sheet A	1	2	3	4	5	6	7	8	9	10	Final
Northwest Territories (Skauge) 🔨	1	0	1	0	0	1	0	0	1	0	4
Manitoba (Gunnlaugson)	0	2	0	1	1	0	0	2	0	1	7

Sheet B	1	2	3	4	5	6	7	8	9	10	Final
New Brunswick (Grattan)	1	0	2	0	2	1	1	0	1	X	8
Yukon (Mikkelsen) 🔨	0	1	0	1	0	0	0	1	0	X	3

Sheet C	1	2	3	4	5	6	7	8	9	10	Final
(Ontario) Wild Card #3 (Howard) 🔨	0	2	0	0	2	0	0	0	0	2	6
(Manitoba) Wild Card #1 (McEwen)	1	0	1	0	0	1	0	2	0	0	5

Sheet D	1	2	3	4	5	6	7	8	9	10	Final
British Columbia (Cotter) 🔨	2	0	1	0	1	0	0	2	1	0	7
Northern Ontario (Jacobs)	0	2	0	1	0	1	2	0	0	2	8

=== Draw 11 ===
Tuesday, March 9, 1:30 pm

Sheet A	1	2	3	4	5	6	7	8	9	10	Final
Newfoundland and Labrador (Smith)	0	1	0	1	0	1	0	1	X	X	4
Ontario (Epping) 🔨	1	0	5	0	1	0	2	0	X	X	9

Sheet B	1	2	3	4	5	6	7	8	9	10	Final
Nunavut (Mackey) 🔨	0	0	2	0	1	0	0	1	0	X	4
Prince Edward Island (MacKenzie)	0	0	0	1	0	2	1	0	3	X	7

Sheet C	1	2	3	4	5	6	7	8	9	10	Final
Nova Scotia (Murphy)	0	1	0	2	0	1	0	0	2	X	6
Canada (Gushue) 🔨	2	0	3	0	2	0	1	0	0	X	8

Sheet D	1	2	3	4	5	6	7	8	9	10	Final
Quebec (Fournier)	0	0	3	0	2	0	0	1	0	X	6
Saskatchewan (Dunstone) 🔨	0	1	0	4	0	2	1	0	1	X	9

=== Draw 12 ===
Tuesday, March 9, 6:30 pm

Sheet A	1	2	3	4	5	6	7	8	9	10	Final
Northern Ontario (Jacobs) 🔨	0	0	2	0	1	0	2	0	1	1	7
Alberta (Bottcher)	0	0	0	1	0	1	0	3	0	0	5

Sheet B	1	2	3	4	5	6	7	8	9	10	Final
(Ontario) Wild Card #3 (Howard)	0	2	0	0	0	0	0	0	0	2	4
British Columbia (Cotter) 🔨	1	0	1	0	0	0	0	1	0	0	3

Sheet C	1	2	3	4	5	6	7	8	9	10	Final
New Brunswick (Grattan) 🔨	0	1	0	0	2	0	0	1	X	X	4
Manitoba (Gunnlaugson)	1	0	2	2	0	2	1	0	X	X	8

Sheet D	1	2	3	4	5	6	7	8	9	10	Final
Yukon (Mikkelsen) 🔨	2	0	0	1	0	1	0	1	0	X	5
Northwest Territories (Skauge)	0	3	1	0	0	0	2	0	3	X	9

=== Draw 13 ===
Wednesday, March 10, 8:30 am

Sheet A	1	2	3	4	5	6	7	8	9	10	Final
Canada (Gushue)	1	0	0	1	0	2	0	1	1	2	8
Prince Edward Island (MacKenzie) 🔨	0	1	0	0	1	0	2	0	0	0	4

Sheet B	1	2	3	4	5	6	7	8	9	10	Final
Saskatchewan (Dunstone)	0	1	0	0	0	1	0	0	X	X	2
(Alberta) Wild Card #2 (Koe) 🔨	2	0	3	1	1	0	1	1	X	X	9

Sheet C	1	2	3	4	5	6	7	8	9	10	Final
Ontario (Epping) 🔨	2	0	0	1	2	0	0	2	0	X	7
Quebec (Fournier)	0	2	1	0	0	3	3	0	1	X	10

Sheet D	1	2	3	4	5	6	7	8	9	10	Final
Newfoundland and Labrador (Smith) 🔨	0	3	1	1	0	1	0	3	X	X	9
Nunavut (Mackey)	1	0	0	0	0	0	1	0	X	X	2

=== Draw 14 ===
Wednesday, March 10, 1:30 pm

Sheet A	1	2	3	4	5	6	7	8	9	10	11	Final
New Brunswick (Grattan)	0	1	0	1	0	0	0	1	0	3	0	6
(Ontario) Wild Card #3 (Howard) 🔨	1	0	1	0	0	2	0	0	2	0	1	7

Sheet B	1	2	3	4	5	6	7	8	9	10	Final
Manitoba (Gunnlaugson)	0	0	0	0	0	0	0	0	0	X	0
Northern Ontario (Jacobs) 🔨	0	0	0	1	0	0	0	1	1	X	3

Sheet C	1	2	3	4	5	6	7	8	9	10	Final
British Columbia (Cotter)	0	2	0	3	0	1	2	0	2	X	10
Northwest Territories (Skauge) 🔨	1	0	2	0	1	0	0	1	0	X	5

Sheet D	1	2	3	4	5	6	7	8	9	10	Final
(Manitoba) Wild Card #1 (McEwen) 🔨	1	0	1	0	1	0	0	0	X	X	3
Alberta (Bottcher)	0	3	0	2	0	2	1	1	X	X	9

=== Draw 15 ===
Wednesday, March 10, 6:30 pm

Sheet A	1	2	3	4	5	6	7	8	9	10	Final
Nova Scotia (Murphy) 🔨	5	4	2	1	0	0	2	0	X	X	14
Nunavut (St. Louis)	0	0	0	0	0	0	0	1	X	X	1

Sheet B	1	2	3	4	5	6	7	8	9	10	Final
Canada (Gushue) 🔨	2	1	0	2	2	3	0	1	X	X	11
Newfoundland and Labrador (Smith)	0	0	2	0	0	0	1	0	X	X	3

Sheet C	1	2	3	4	5	6	7	8	9	10	Final
Prince Edward Island (MacKenzie) 🔨	1	0	2	0	1	0	0	1	0	X	5
Saskatchewan (Dunstone)	0	3	0	2	0	1	1	0	3	X	10

Sheet D	1	2	3	4	5	6	7	8	9	10	Final
(Alberta) Wild Card #2 (Koe)	0	2	0	1	0	0	0	0	X	X	3
Ontario (Epping) 🔨	1	0	2	0	2	2	1	1	X	X	9

=== Draw 16 ===
Thursday, March 11, 8:30 am

Sheet A	1	2	3	4	5	6	7	8	9	10	Final
Manitoba (Gunnlaugson)	0	2	0	0	1	0	1	0	0	0	4
British Columbia (Cotter) 🔨	1	0	0	3	0	1	0	0	1	1	7

Sheet B	1	2	3	4	5	6	7	8	9	10	Final
Northwest Territories (Skauge)	0	0	1	0	0	0	0	2	X	X	3
(Manitoba) Wild Card #1 (McEwen) 🔨	1	2	0	4	3	1	1	0	X	X	12

Sheet C	1	2	3	4	5	6	7	8	9	10	Final
Alberta (Bottcher) 🔨	1	0	0	0	0	5	2	3	X	X	11
Yukon (Mikkelsen)	0	0	1	0	1	0	0	0	X	X	2

Sheet D	1	2	3	4	5	6	7	8	9	10	Final
Northern Ontario (Jacobs)	0	0	1	0	2	0	2	0	1	0	6
(Ontario) Wild Card #3 (Howard) 🔨	2	1	0	1	0	2	0	1	0	1	8

=== Draw 17 ===
Thursday, March 11, 1:30 pm

Sheet A	1	2	3	4	5	6	7	8	9	10	Final
Quebec (Fournier) 🔨	0	2	1	1	1	0	0	0	0	X	5
(Alberta) Wild Card #2 (Koe)	3	0	0	0	0	2	1	2	2	X	10

Sheet B	1	2	3	4	5	6	7	8	9	10	Final
Prince Edward Island (MacKenzie)	0	0	0	2	0	2	0	0	X	X	4
Ontario (Epping) 🔨	0	2	1	0	1	0	3	1	X	X	8

Sheet C	1	2	3	4	5	6	7	8	9	10	Final
Canada (Gushue) 🔨	3	3	0	0	0	2	0	1	X	X	9
Nunavut (Mackey)	0	0	0	0	1	0	1	0	X	X	2

Sheet D	1	2	3	4	5	6	7	8	9	10	Final
Saskatchewan (Dunstone) 🔨	0	3	1	0	1	0	1	0	1	X	7
Nova Scotia (Murphy)	0	0	0	1	0	1	0	3	0	X	5

=== Draw 18 ===
Thursday, March 11, 6:30 pm

Sheet A	1	2	3	4	5	6	7	8	9	10	Final
Yukon (Mikkelsen)	0	0	0	0	0	1	0	1	X	X	2
(Manitoba) Wild Card #1 (McEwen) 🔨	2	2	2	3	4	0	1	0	X	X	14

Sheet B	1	2	3	4	5	6	7	8	9	10	Final
British Columbia (Cotter)	0	0	1	0	2	0	1	0	1	0	5
Alberta (Bottcher) 🔨	0	1	0	1	0	1	0	1	0	3	7

Sheet C	1	2	3	4	5	6	7	8	9	10	Final
Manitoba (Gunnlaugson)	0	0	2	0	0	0	0	0	2	0	4
(Ontario) Wild Card #3 (Howard) 🔨	1	0	0	0	0	1	0	1	0	2	5

Sheet D	1	2	3	4	5	6	7	8	9	10	Final
Northwest Territories (Skauge)	1	0	1	0	3	2	1	0	0	2	10
New Brunswick (Grattan) 🔨	0	2	0	2	0	0	0	1	1	0	6

== Championship pool standings ==
The top four teams from each pool advance to the championship pool. All wins and losses earned in the round robin were carried forward into the championship pool.

Final Championship Pool Standings

Key
Teams to Playoffs

Team	Skip	W	L	PF	PA	EW	EL	BE	SE	S%
(Alberta) Wild Card #2	Kevin Koe	10	2	102	64	54	44	6	18	89%
Saskatchewan	Matt Dunstone	9	3	80	67	48	46	7	10	86%
Alberta	Brendan Bottcher	9	3	91	55	50	42	11	12	88%
Canada	Brad Gushue	8	4	87	59	52	39	9	15	86%
(Ontario) Wild Card #3	Wayne Middaugh	8	4	80	64	49	44	14	6	85%
Northern Ontario	Brad Jacobs	7	5	78	61	48	42	12	11	86%
Ontario	John Epping	7	5	91	70	47	43	4	13	84%
Manitoba	Jason Gunnlaugson	6	6	64	76	39	47	13	6	84%

== Championship pool results ==
=== Draw 19 ===
Friday, March 12, 12:30 pm

Sheet A	1	2	3	4	5	6	7	8	9	10	Final
Manitoba (Gunnlaugson) 🔨	2	0	0	2	0	1	0	2	0	X	7
Ontario (Epping)	0	1	0	0	2	0	2	0	1	X	6

Sheet B	1	2	3	4	5	6	7	8	9	10	11	Final
(Alberta) Wild Card #2 (Koe)	0	0	3	0	0	2	0	0	0	2	0	7
Alberta (Bottcher) 🔨	0	4	0	1	0	0	1	0	1	0	1	8

Sheet C	1	2	3	4	5	6	7	8	9	10	Final
(Ontario) Wild Card #3 (Howard)	0	0	4	0	1	0	1	0	1	2	9
Saskatchewan (Dunstone) 🔨	1	0	0	1	0	1	0	2	0	0	5

Sheet D	1	2	3	4	5	6	7	8	9	10	Final
Canada (Gushue)	0	0	1	0	0	1	0	0	X	X	2
Northern Ontario (Jacobs) 🔨	2	0	0	0	2	0	0	3	X	X	7

=== Draw 20 ===
Friday, March 12, 6:30 pm

Sheet A	1	2	3	4	5	6	7	8	9	10	Final
Northern Ontario (Jacobs)	0	0	0	2	0	1	0	0	2	0	5
(Alberta) Wild Card #2 (Koe) 🔨	0	0	1	0	2	0	0	1	0	4	8

Sheet B	1	2	3	4	5	6	7	8	9	10	Final
Ontario (Epping)	0	1	0	4	0	3	0	2	0	X	10
(Ontario) Wild Card #3 (Howard) 🔨	3	0	1	0	1	0	2	0	1	X	8

Sheet C	1	2	3	4	5	6	7	8	9	10	Final
Canada (Gushue) 🔨	3	1	0	1	2	2	3	0	X	X	12
Manitoba (Gunnlaugson)	0	0	1	0	0	0	0	1	X	X	2

Sheet D	1	2	3	4	5	6	7	8	9	10	Final
Alberta (Bottcher)	0	0	0	0	2	0	2	0	2	1	7
Saskatchewan (Dunstone) 🔨	1	1	1	2	0	1	0	2	0	0	8

=== Draw 21 ===
Saturday, March 13, 12:30 pm

Sheet A	1	2	3	4	5	6	7	8	9	10	Final
(Ontario) Wild Card #3 (Howard)	0	1	0	0	0	1	0	1	0	X	3
Canada (Gushue) 🔨	2	0	0	2	0	0	1	0	1	X	6

Sheet B	1	2	3	4	5	6	7	8	9	10	Final
Saskatchewan (Dunstone)	0	0	0	1	1	0	2	0	0	1	5
Northern Ontario (Jacobs) 🔨	0	1	0	0	0	1	0	2	0	0	4

Sheet C	1	2	3	4	5	6	7	8	9	10	Final
Ontario (Epping)	0	0	1	0	0	0	0	2	0	X	3
Alberta (Bottcher) 🔨	2	2	0	0	0	0	2	0	2	X	8

Sheet D	1	2	3	4	5	6	7	8	9	10	Final
Manitoba (Gunnlaugson) 🔨	1	0	0	2	0	1	0	0	X	X	4
(Alberta) Wild Card #2 (Koe)	0	3	3	0	3	0	1	2	X	X	12

=== Draw 22 ===
Saturday, March 13, 6:30 pm

Sheet A	1	2	3	4	5	6	7	8	9	10	Final
Saskatchewan (Dunstone) 🔨	2	0	3	0	3	0	1	0	X	X	9
Manitoba (Gunnlaugson)	0	1	0	2	0	2	0	1	X	X	6

Sheet B	1	2	3	4	5	6	7	8	9	10	Final
Alberta (Bottcher) 🔨	0	2	1	3	1	0	0	1	X	X	8
Canada (Gushue)	0	0	0	0	0	1	1	0	X	X	2

Sheet C	1	2	3	4	5	6	7	8	9	10	Final
(Alberta) Wild Card #2 (Koe)	0	1	0	2	0	1	1	1	1	0	7
(Ontario) Wild Card #3 (Howard) 🔨	1	0	2	0	1	0	0	0	0	2	6

Sheet D	1	2	3	4	5	6	7	8	9	10	Final
Northern Ontario (Jacobs) 🔨	0	1	1	2	0	3	2	0	X	X	9
Ontario (Epping)	0	0	0	0	3	0	0	0	X	X	3

== Playoffs ==
To offset for the extra pool stage games played due to the additional Wild Card teams admitted to the tournament, the playoffs reverted to the former system consisting of only a semi-final and final, with only top three teams qualifying. The "page playoff" 1-2 game and the "quarter-final" 3-4 game were not played.

Semifinal			Final
			1	(Alberta) Wild Card #2	2
2	Saskatchewan	5	3	Alberta	4
3	Alberta	6

=== Semifinal ===
Sunday, March 14, 12:30 pm

Sheet C	1	2	3	4	5	6	7	8	9	10	Final
Saskatchewan (Dunstone) 🔨	1	0	1	0	0	1	0	0	2	0	5
Alberta (Bottcher)	0	1	0	0	1	0	1	1	0	2	6

Player percentages
Saskatchewan		Alberta	
Dustin Kidby	94%	Karrick Martin	91%
Kirk Muyres	91%	Brad Thiessen	75%
Braeden Moskowy	85%	Darren Moulding	79%
Matt Dunstone	81%	Brendan Bottcher	83%
Total	88%	Total	82%

=== Final ===
Sunday, March 14, 6:30 pm

Sheet C	1	2	3	4	5	6	7	8	9	10	Final
(Alberta) Wild Card #2 (Koe) 🔨	0	0	1	0	0	0	0	1	0	X	2
Alberta (Bottcher)	0	0	0	0	0	0	3	0	1	X	4

Player percentages
(Alberta) Wild Card #2		Alberta	
Ben Hebert	85%	Karrick Martin	91%
John Morris	91%	Brad Thiessen	85%
B.J. Neufeld	85%	Darren Moulding	93%
Kevin Koe	74%	Brendan Bottcher	97%
Total	84%	Total	91%

== Statistics ==
=== Top 5 player percentages ===
After Championship Pool; minimum 6 games

Key
First All-Star Team
Second All-Star Team

Leads	%
(Quebec) Jean-François Trépanier	94
WC2 Ben Hebert	93
(Northern Ontario) Ryan Harnden	92
(Ontario) Brent Laing	92
(Manitoba) Connor Njegovan	91
WC1 Colin Hodgson	91

Seconds	%
(Alberta) Brad Thiessen	89
WC2 John Morris	87
WC3 David Mathers	86
(Northern Ontario) E.J. Harnden	85
(Canada) Brett Gallant	84
(Quebec) Félix Asselin	84
(Saskatchewan) Kirk Muyres	84

Thirds	%
(Saskatchewan) Braeden Moskowy	89
WC2 B.J. Neufeld	88
(Alberta) Darren Moulding	87
(Northern Ontario) Marc Kennedy	86
WC3 Scott Howard	86
(Canada) Mark Nichols	86

Skips	%
(Canada) Brad Gushue	88
WC2 Kevin Koe	87
(Alberta) Brendan Bottcher	85
(Saskatchewan) Matt Dunstone	85
WC3 Wayne Middaugh	83

=== Perfect games ===
Round robin and championship pool only; minimum 10 shots thrown

Player	Team	Position	Shots	Opponent
Brad Gushue	Canada	Skip	18	Ontario
John Epping	Ontario	Skip	16	Nunavut
Karrick Martin	Alberta	Lead	16	Yukon
Brad Gushue	Canada	Skip	16	Nunavut
Braeden Moskowy	Saskatchewan	Third	16	Manitoba

== Awards ==
The awards and all-star teams were as follows:

All-Star Teams

First Team

- Skip: Brad Gushue, Team Canada
- Third: Braeden Moskowy, Saskatchewan
- Second: Brad Thiessen, Alberta
- Lead: (Alberta) Ben Hebert, Team Wild Card 2

Second Team

- Skip: (Alberta) Kevin Koe, Team Wild Card 2
- Third: (Alberta) B.J. Neufeld, Team Wild Card 2
- Second: Brett Gallant, Team Canada
- Lead: Ryan Harnden, Northern Ontario

Ross Harstone Sportsmanship Award

- Brendan Bottcher, Alberta Skip

Hec Gervais Most Valuable Player Award

- Brendan Bottcher, Alberta Skip

== Final standings ==
Team	Rank
Alberta	1st place, gold medalist(s)
(Alberta) Wild Card #2	2nd place, silver medalist(s)
Saskatchewan	3rd place, bronze medalist(s)
Canada	4
(Ontario) Wild Card #3	5
Northern Ontario	6
Ontario	7
Manitoba	8
New Brunswick	T–9
Nova Scotia	T–9
Quebec	T–9
(Manitoba) Wild Card #1	T–9
British Columbia	13
Newfoundland and Labrador	T–14
Northwest Territories	T–14
Prince Edward Island	16
Nunavut	T–17
Yukon	T–17

== Provincial and territorial playdowns ==
Due to the COVID-19 pandemic, many provincial playdowns were cancelled, with member associations electing to send their 2020 champions to the Brier.

- Boston Pizza Cup (Alberta): Cancelled
- (British Columbia) BC Men's Curling Championship: Cancelled
- Viterra Championship (Manitoba): Cancelled
- New Brunswick Tankard: Cancelled
- The 2021 Newfoundland and Labrador Tankard was held January 27–31 in St. John's. In the final, Team Greg Smith defeated Team Colin Thomas 9–8 in a double extra end. The event was held in a round robin between eight teams.
- Northern Ontario Men's Provincial Curling Championship: Cancelled
- The 2021 Northwest Territories Men's Curling Championship was held January 30–31 in Yellowknife. Team Greg Skauge defeated Team Glen Hudy two games to one in the best of three series. They were the only teams to enter.
- Deloitte Tankard (Nova Scotia): Cancelled
- The Nunavut Brier Playdowns were played at the Iqaluit Curling Club in Iqaluit, January 8–10. Team MacKey (Peter Mackey, Jeff Nadeau, Greg Howard, Jeff Chown) defeated Team Kingdon (Wade Kingdon, Hunter Tootoo, Peter Van Strien, Cory Bell) 3 games to 2 in a best of five series. Team MacKey won three straight games after losing their first two.
- Ontario Tankard: Cancelled
- (Prince Edward Island) The 2021 PEI Tankard was held January 29–30 in O'Leary. Team Eddie MacKenzie defeated Team Blair Jay 3 games to 0 in the best of five series. They were the only two teams to enter the event.
- Quebec Tankard: Cancelled
- SaskTel Tankard (Saskatchewan): Cancelled
- The Yukon Men's Curling Championship was not held, as only one team (Dustin Mikkelsen) entered. The defending Thomas Scoffin rink had been deemed ineligible, as it could not field a full team for the championship due to COVID-19 travel restrictions.
