= Jonathan Beuk =

Canadian curler

- Curler
- Born: April 18, 1983 (age 43); Etobicoke, Ontario

Team
- Curling club: Cataraqui G&CC, Kingston, ON
- Skip: James Grattan
- Third: Jonathan Beuk
- Second: Andy McCann
- Lead: Noah Riggs

Curling career
- Member Association: Ontario (2010–2026); New Brunswick (2021; 2026–present)
- Brier: 2 (2019, 2021)
- Top CTRS ranking: 8th (2022–23)

Jonathan Beuk (born April 18, 1983) is a Canadian curler from Kingston, Ontario. He currently plays third on Team James Grattan.

== Career ==
While attending Queen's University, Beuk led his team of Andrew Inouye, Chadd Vandermade and Scott Chadwick to a gold medal at the 2010 CIS/CCA Curling Championships, Canada's University curling championship. The team represented Canada at the 2011 Winter Universiade, where they missed out on the playoffs, finishing with a 6–3 record.

After University, Beuk joined the Jake Higgs rink, throwing second stones for the team. It was as a member of this team that Beuk played in his first provincial men's championship, the 2012 Dominion Tankard. There, the team finished with a 3–7 record.

From 2012 to 2015, Beuk played third for the Ottawa-based Don Bowser rink. As a member of the Bowser rink, he won two provincial Silver Tankards, for the Rideau Curling Club in 2013 and the Ottawa Curling Club in 2014. During this time, Beuk also won the 2015 Ontario Mixed Curling Championship playing second for Chris Gardner. The team represented Ontario at the 2015 Canadian Mixed Curling Championship, where they won the bronze medal.

In 2015, Greg Balsdon took over as skip of the Bowser rink, with Bowser moving to third, and Beuk moving to second. In their first season together, the team won the 2015 Challenge Casino de Charlevoix World Curling Tour event. Later in the season, the team played in the 2016 Ontario Tankard provincial men's championship. There, Balsdon led the team to a fourth-place finish. The next season, the team won their second tour event, the 2016 GSOC Tour Challenge Tier 2 event, which qualified the team to play in two Grand Slams that season, the 2017 Meridian Canadian Open (1–3 record), and the 2017 Humpty's Champions Cup (1–3 record). The team also played in the 2017 Ontario Tankard, where they missed the playoffs after losing in a tiebreaker. In their third season together, the Balsdon rink qualified for the 2017 Canadian Olympic Curling Pre-Trials, where they lost in the B semi-final. A week later they played in the 2017 Boost National Grand Slam event, where they lost in a tiebreaker. At the 2018 Ontario Tankard, the team was eliminated after a 2–3 record.

In 2018, Beuk joined the Scott McDonald rink as McDonald's third. The team found quick success on the tour, winning the 2018 Challenge de Curling de Gatineau event. The team played in two Slams that season, going 1–3 both the 2018 National and the 2019 Canadian Open. The team then went on a surprise run at the 2019 Ontario Tankard, going undefeated at the event en route to their first provincial men's title. They represented Ontario at the 2019 Tim Hortons Brier, where they finished with a 6–5 round robin record. The next season, the team won the 2019 Challenge Casino de Charlevoix event, and played in three slams, the 2019 Masters (0–4 record), the 2019 Tour Challenge (0–4) and the 2019 National (1–3). At the 2020 Ontario Tankard, the team lost in the semifinal.

Due to the COVID-19 pandemic in Canada, many provinces had to cancel their provincial championships, with member associations selecting their representatives for the 2021 Tim Hortons Brier. As the reigning provincial champions in New Brunswick, Team James Grattan was invited to represent New Brunswick at the Brier, which they accepted. Grattan's third Paul Dobson opted not to attend the event due to travel restrictions. The team then invited Beuk to replace Dobson at the national championship in Calgary, Alberta. At the Brier, the team had a strong start, defeating higher seeds Mike McEwen and Brad Jacobs to sit at 4–1 with three games left. They then, however, lost their last three games, just failing to qualify for the championship pool.

== Personal life ==
Beuk works as a data monitor for the Canadian Consortium on Neurodegeneration in Aging. He has also worked as a psychometrist at Dr. Duncan Day & Associates. He is married to Sarah Simpson, and has one daughter. He grew up in Mississauga, Ontario. He graduated with a PhD in neuroscience from Queen's.
