= Scott Jones (curler) =

Canadian curler (born 1971)

- Curler
- Born: November 4, 1971 (age 55); Moncton, New Brunswick, Canada

Team
- Curling club: Curl Moncton, Moncton, NB
- Skip: Scott Jones
- Third: Brian King
- Second: Alex Peasley
- Lead: Sam Forestell

Curling career
- Member Association: New Brunswick
- Brier: 5 (2007, 2012, 2016, 2017, 2023)
- Top CTRS ranking: 44th (2011–12)

Scott Jones (born November 4, 1971) is a Canadian curler from Moncton, New Brunswick.

== Career ==
=== Juniors ===
Jones won the 1990 New Brunswick junior men's title, skipping a rink of Darrell Rice, Sean Hughson and Shane Longley. The team represented New Brunswick at the 1990 Canadian Junior Curling Championships, with Jones playing second on the team. There, the rink would finish with a 3–8 record, in 11th place.

=== Men's ===
Jones won his first provincial men's title in 2007, throwing third rocks for the Paul Dobson rink. At the 2007 Tim Hortons Brier, the rink would finish last, with a 1–10 record.

In 2008, Jones won the New Brunswick mixed title as a skip with teammates Sandy Comeau, Pierre Fraser and Stephanie Taylor. They would represent New Brunswick at the 2009 Canadian Mixed Curling Championship. There, he led the province to a 5–6 record.

Jones returned to the Brier in 2012 after winning his second provincial title. At the 2012 Tim Hortons Brier, Jones played second for the New Brunswick team, skipped by Terry Odishaw. At the Brier, the team would finish with a 5–6 round robin record.

Jones won another New Brunswick mixed title as skip in 2014. He and teammates Cathlia Ward, Chris Jeffrey and Kendra Lister represented New Brunswick at the 2015 Canadian Mixed Curling Championship, where they finished with a 4–5 record.

Jones, Marc LeCocq and Jamie Brannen, who have been teammates for a number of years added World Senior champion Mike Kennedy as their skip for the 2015–16 season. The team would go on to win the New Brunswick championship, and play in the 2016 Tim Hortons Brier where they would miss the playoffs with a 3–8 record. The team won the provincial title again the next season and played in the 2017 Tim Hortons Brier where they did not do very well, finishing with a 1–10 record.

The team parted ways after the 2016–17 season with Jones forming his own team with long-time teammate Jamie Brannen at third, Brian King at second and Robert Daley at lead. At the New Brunswick championship, the team went 3–4, missing the playoffs. The following season, they qualified for the playoffs at the 2019 NB Tankard after winning the tiebreaker. They then lost the semi-final to James Grattan. Brannen left the team following that season and they added 2015 provincial champion Jeremy Mallais at third. They would have a successful start as a team, winning both the Steele Cup Cash and the Atlantic Superstore Monctonian Challenge. Jones also got to play in his first Grand Slam of Curling event at the 2019 Tour Challenge Tier 2. After going 2–2 in the round robin, they lost the tiebreaker to Rich Ruohonen.

== Personal life ==
Jones is employed as the chief financial officer for Blue Line Innovations Inc and Moncton Magic. He has a partner, one child and two step-children.
