= James Grattan (curler) =

Canadian curler (born 1974)

- Curler
- Born: July 28, 1974 (age 52); Ottawa, Ontario, Canada

Team
- Curling club: Gage Golf & CC, Oromocto, New Brunswick
- Skip: James Grattan
- Third: Jonathan Beuk
- Second: Andy McCann
- Lead: Noah Riggs
- Alternate: Drew Grattan

Curling career
- Member Association: New Brunswick
- Brier: 18 (1997, 2002, 2003, 2004, 2006, 2008, 2009, 2010, 2011, 2013, 2014, 2018, 2020, 2021, 2022, 2024, 2025, 2026)
- Top CTRS ranking: 12th (2004–05)
Medal record
Men's curling
Representing New Brunswick
Tim Hortons Brier
Bronze medal – third place	1997 Calgary
Bronze medal – third place	2002 Calgary

James Grattan, nicknamed "Jimmy the Kid" (born July 28, 1974, in Ottawa, Ontario) is a Canadian curler from Oromocto, New Brunswick. He currently skips his own team.

== Career ==
Grattan's best personal result as a skip at the Brier is third place (1997). In 2002–2004 he played third for Russ Howard. He skipped again in 2006 (5–6 in Regina), after defeating Dan Sherrard in the New Brunswick Tankard final, and 2008 (2–9 Winnipeg), after defeating Jeremy Mallais in the provincial final. He played third for Howard again in 2009 (6–5 Calgary). He moved back to skip the following season and the team won the provincial championship. He skipped the team to a 3–8 record at the 2010 Tim Hortons Brier.

Grattan curled with Charlie Sullivan, Steven Howard and Pete Case for the 2010–11 season. The team won the 2011 Molson Canadian Men's Provincial Curling Championship, the New Brunswick provincial men's championship and finished 4–7 at the 2011 Tim Hortons Brier in London, Ontario.

For the 2012–13 season, Grattan joined 2005 Canadian junior champion brothers Jason and Darren Roach, as Steve Howard and Charlie Sullivan have moved on to other interests. Grattan qualified for his 10th Brier by winning the 2013 Molson Canadian Men's Provincial Curling Championship. He finished 5–6 at the 2013 Tim Hortons Brier in Edmonton. The team finished just outside of the playoffs at the 2014 Tim Hortons Brier with a 6–5 record.

In the 2014–2015 season, Grattan and company lost the Provincial Final to Jeremy Mallais. Grattan has been very outspoken on the new relegation format brought to the Brier in 2015. He made his 12th appearance when he won the 2018 Papa John's Pizza Tankard. The team finished 2–5 in the new pool play format which eliminated them from contention. They won their placement game against British Columbia 12–5 after scoring a seven-ender. Grattan finished runner-up at the 2019 NB Tankard the following season, falling short to Terry Odishaw in the final.

Grattan and his team of third Paul Dobson, second Andy McCann, lead Jamie Brannen and alternate Chris Jeffrey had a successful 2019–20 season. On the tour, they picked up a win at the Jim Sullivan Curling Classic and played in the 2019 Tour Challenge Tier 2, finishing 1–3. Later that season, the team won the 2020 New Brunswick Tankard and represented New Brunswick at the 2020 Tim Hortons Brier in Kingston, Ontario. After starting 1–2, they upset higher seeds Ontario's John Epping and British Columbia's Steve Laycock to sit in a good spot going into their final two games. Unfortunately, they would lose both of those games, finishing the round robin at 3–4, missing the playoffs.

Due to the COVID-19 pandemic in New Brunswick, the 2021 provincial championship was cancelled. As the reigning provincial champions, Team Grattan was invited to represent New Brunswick at the 2021 Tim Hortons Brier, which they accepted. One member of Grattan's team, Paul Dobson, opted not to attend the event due to travel restrictions. He was replaced by Jonathan Beuk of Ontario. At the Brier, Grattan and his New Brunswick rink had a strong start, defeating higher seeds Mike McEwen and Brad Jacobs to sit at 4–1 with three games left. They then, however, lost their last three games, just failing to qualify for the championship pool, like in 2020.

During the 2021–22 curling season, Grattan picked up Darren Moulding to play third for this team, after Moulding had been cut from the defending Brier champion Brendan Bottcher rink. After winning the 2022 New Brunswick Tankard, the team represented the province at the 2022 Tim Hortons Brier. The team was placed in the same pool as the Bottcher rink, who were representing Team Canada as defending champions. Their game was seen as "highly-anticipated". Despite Bottcher's team being from the host province of Alberta, fans were more supportive of New Brunswick, as Moulding is from the Lethbridge area. Team Canada ultimately won the game, 6–4. The team finished the Brier with a 3–5 record.

== Personal life ==
Grattan is married and has two children. He works as a customer service agent for Air Canada. His wife is from Carbonear, Newfoundland and Labrador.
