= Paul Dobson (curler) =

Canadian curler

- Curler
- Born: May 30, 1979 (age 47); Saint John, New Brunswick

Team
- Curling club: Thistle Saint Andrews CC, Saint John, NB
- Skip: James Grattan
- Third: Joel Krats
- Second: Paul Dobson
- Lead: Andy McCann
- Alternate: Drew Grattan

Curling career
- Member Association: New Brunswick
- Brier: 6 (2005, 2007, 2020, 2022, 2024, 2025)
- Top CTRS ranking: 31st (2023–24)

Paul Dobson (born May 30, 1979, in Saint John, New Brunswick) is a Canadian curler from Quispamsis, New Brunswick. He currently plays second on Team James Grattan.

== Career ==
Dobson won his first New Brunswick Tankard in 2005 as second for Wade Blanchard. They defeated Russ Howard in the final. They finished in eleventh place at the 2005 Tim Hortons Brier with a 3–8 record. The following season, he began skipping his own team with Scott Jones, Ryan Porter and Pierre Fraser. The team won the 2007 New Brunswick Labatt Tankard, defeating Howard in the provincial final, and finished last at the 2007 Tim Hortons Brier only able to win one of eleven games. Dobson continued to play in the provincial men's championship but failed to win from 2008 to 2019. He joined the James Grattan rink for the 2019–20 season. On the tour, they picked up a win at the Jim Sullivan Curling Classic and played in the 2019 Tour Challenge Tier 2, finishing 1–3. Later that season, the team won the 2020 New Brunswick Tankard and represented New Brunswick at the 2020 Tim Hortons Brier in Kingston, Ontario. After starting 1–2, they upset higher seeds Ontario's John Epping and British Columbia's Steve Laycock to sit in a good spot going into their final two games. Unfortunately, they would lose both of those games, finishing the round robin at 3–4, missing the playoffs.

Due to the COVID-19 pandemic in New Brunswick, the 2021 provincial championship was cancelled. As the reigning provincial champions, Team Grattan was invited to represent New Brunswick at the 2021 Tim Hortons Brier, which they accepted. Dobson, however, opted not to attend the event due to travel restrictions. He was replaced by Jonathan Beuk of Ontario. At the Brier, his team finished with a 4–4 record.

== Personal life ==
Dobson is married and has two children, Chloe and Elyse. He works in operations at Irving Paper.

== Teams ==
| Season | Skip | Third | Second | Lead | Alternate |
|---|---|---|---|---|---|
| 2004–05 | Wade Blanchard | Mark Dobson | Paul Dobson | Geoff Porter | Brian Dobson |
| 2006–07 | Paul Dobson | Scott Jones | Ryan Porter | Pierre Fraser | Mark Dobson |
| 2007–08 | Paul Dobson | Scott Jones | Ryan Porter | Pierre Fraser | Geoff Porter |
| 2009–10 | Paul Dobson | Geoff Porter | Ryan Porter | Mark Dobson | |
| 2010–11 | Paul Dobson | Kevin Boyle | Mark Dobson | Spencer Mawhinney | |
| 2011–12 | Paul Dobson | Kevin Boyle | Mark Dobson | Spencer Mawhinney | |
| 2012–13 | Paul Dobson | Kevin Boyle | Mark Dobson | Spencer Mawhinney | |
| 2013–14 | Paul Dobson | Kevin Boyle | Mark Dobson | Spencer Mawhinney | |
| 2014–15 | Terry Odishaw | Paul Dobson | Mark Dobson | Spencer Mawhinney | |
| 2015–16 | Peter Case | Paul Dobson | Mark Dobson | Spencer Mawhinney | |
| 2016–17 | Charlie Sullivan | Paul Dobson | Mark Dobson | Spencer Mawhinney | |
| 2017–18 | Paul Dobson (Fourth) | Charlie Sullivan (Skip) | Mark Dobson | Spencer Mawhinney | |
| 2018–19 | Paul Dobson | Spencer Watts | Mark Dobson | Spencer Mawhinney | |
| 2019–20 | James Grattan | Paul Dobson | Andy McCann | Jamie Brannen | Chris Jeffrey |
| 2020–21 | James Grattan | Paul Dobson | Andy McCann | Jamie Brannen | |
| 2021–22 | James Grattan | Darren Moulding | Paul Dobson | Andy McCann | Jamie Brannen |
| 2022–23 | James Grattan | Scott McDonald | Paul Dobson | Andy McCann | |
| 2023–24 | James Grattan | Joel Krats | Paul Dobson | Andy McCann | Drew Grattan |
| 2024–25 | James Grattan | Joel Krats | Paul Dobson | Andy McCann | Drew Grattan |
