= 2024 Ocean Contractors Tankard =

- Host city: Halifax, Nova Scotia
- Arena: Halifax Curling Club
- Dates: January 17–21
- Winner: Team Manuel
- Curling club: Halifax CC, Halifax
- Skip: Matthew Manuel
- Third: Luke Saunders
- Second: Jeffrey Meagher
- Lead: Nick Zachernuk
- Coach: Kim Kelly
- Finalist: Owen Purcell

The 2024 Ocean Contractors Tankard, the provincial men's curling championship for Nova Scotia, was held from January 17 to 21 at the Halifax Curling Club in Halifax, Nova Scotia. The winning Matthew Manuel rink represented Nova Scotia at the 2024 Montana's Brier in Regina, Saskatchewan. The event was held in conjunction with the 2024 Nova Scotia Scotties Tournament of Hearts, the women's provincial championship.

For the first time since 2020, there was an Open Qualifier playdown to determine the final field.

== Qualification process ==
Qualification method	Berths	Qualifying team(s)
2023 Nova Scotia Tankard finalists	2	Matthew Manuel; Owen Purcell
2023-24 CTRS leaders	2	Bryce Everist; Stuart Thompson
Open Qualifier	4	Paul Flemming; Brent MacDougall; Glen MacLeod; Colten Steele

== Teams ==
The teams are listed as follows:

Skip	Third	Second	Lead	Coach	Club
Bryce Everist	Paul Dexter	Chris MacRae	Taylor Ardiel		Halifax CC, Halifax
Paul Flemming	Peter Burgess	Ian Juurlink	Kelly Mittelstadt		Truro CC, Truro
Brent MacDougall	Martin Gavin	Neil Gallant	Kirk MacDiarmid		Mayflower CC, Halifax
Glen MacLeod	Craig Burgess	Kevin Ouellette	Peter Neily		Halifax CC, Halifax
Matthew Manuel	Luke Saunders	Jeffrey Meagher	Nick Zachernuk	Kim Kelly	Halifax CC, Halifax
Owen Purcell	Ryan Abraham	Scott Saccary	Adam McEachren	Mark Dacey	Halifax CC, Halifax
Colten Steele	Kerry MacLean	Nick Burdock	Robby McLean		Dartmouth CC, Dartmouth
Stuart Thompson	Cameron MacKenzie	Travis Colter	Phil Crowell		Halifax CC, Halifax

== Knockout brackets ==
=== A event ===
First Knockout	Qualifier 1
Owen Purcell	10
Glen MacLeod	5
Owen Purcell	6
Paul Flemming	5
Bryce Everist	7
Paul Flemming	10
Owen Purcell	5
Matthew Manuel	7
Matthew Manuel	7
Brent MacDougall	4
Matthew Manuel	7
Stuart Thompson	4
Stuart Thompson	8
Colten Steele	6

=== B event ===
Second Knockout	Qualifier 2
Stuart Thompson	9
Glen MacLeod	4	Bryce Everist	5	Owen Purcell	7
Bryce Everist	7	Stuart Thompson	7	Stuart Thompson	5
Paul Flemming	3
Paul Flemming	5
Brent MacDougall	5	Brent MacDougall	4
Colten Steele	2

=== C event ===
Third Knockout		Qualifier 3
		Stuart Thompson	5
Colten Steele	8	Colten Steele	7
Bryce Everist	6

Third Knockout		Qualifier 4
		Paul Flemming	9
Glen MacLeod	4	Brent MacDougall	2
Brent MacDougall	8

== Knockout results ==
All draw times listed in Atlantic Time (UTC−04:00).

=== Draw 1 ===
Wednesday, January 17, 2:00 pm

Sheet 1	1	2	3	4	5	6	7	8	9	10	Final
Bryce Everist	0	0	1	0	1	0	3	0	2	0	7
Paul Flemming 🔨	0	2	0	3	0	1	0	2	0	2	10

Sheet 8	1	2	3	4	5	6	7	8	9	10	Final
Owen Purcell 🔨	1	0	3	0	1	0	4	0	1	X	10
Glen MacLeod	0	1	0	1	0	2	0	1	0	X	5

=== Draw 2 ===
Wednesday, January 17, 7:00 pm

Sheet 8	1	2	3	4	5	6	7	8	9	10	Final
Stuart Thompson	2	0	0	0	1	1	1	1	0	2	8
Colten Steele 🔨	0	2	1	2	0	0	0	0	1	0	6

Sheet 4	1	2	3	4	5	6	7	8	9	10	Final
Matthew Manuel	0	0	2	1	0	2	0	0	2	X	7
Brent MacDougall 🔨	0	2	0	0	1	0	1	0	0	X	4

=== Draw 3 ===
Thursday, January 18, 9:00 am

Sheet 1	1	2	3	4	5	6	7	8	9	10	Final
Brent MacDougall	0	0	2	0	0	1	1	1	0	X	5
Colten Steele 🔨	0	0	0	1	0	0	0	0	1	X	2

Sheet 2	1	2	3	4	5	6	7	8	9	10	Final
Glen MacLeod	1	0	2	0	1	0	0	0	0	X	4
Bryce Everist 🔨	0	1	0	2	0	0	2	1	1	X	7

=== Draw 4 ===
Thursday, January 18, 2:00 pm

Sheet 2	1	2	3	4	5	6	7	8	9	10	Final
Matthew Manuel	0	0	1	1	0	0	2	0	2	1	7
Stuart Thompson 🔨	1	0	0	0	0	2	0	1	0	0	4

Sheet 4	1	2	3	4	5	6	7	8	9	10	Final
Owen Purcell 🔨	1	0	0	2	0	0	0	0	1	2	6
Paul Flemming	0	0	1	0	0	2	0	2	0	0	5

=== Draw 5 ===
Thursday, January 18, 7:00 pm

Sheet 1	1	2	3	4	5	6	7	8	9	10	Final
Stuart Thompson 🔨	2	2	0	2	0	2	1	0	X	X	9
Bryce Everist	0	0	2	0	2	0	0	1	X	X	5

Sheet 2	1	2	3	4	5	6	7	8	9	10	Final
Paul Flemming 🔨	2	0	0	0	2	0	0	1	0	0	5
Brent MacDougall	0	0	0	0	0	2	0	0	1	1	4

=== Draw 6 ===
Friday, January 19, 9:00 am

Sheet 1	1	2	3	4	5	6	7	8	9	10	Final
Glen MacLeod	0	1	0	0	2	0	0	0	1	X	4
Brent MacDougall 🔨	0	0	1	2	0	2	2	1	0	X	8

Sheet 8	1	2	3	4	5	6	7	8	9	10	Final
Stuart Thompson 🔨	0	0	1	0	1	0	3	0	2	X	7
Paul Flemming	0	0	0	1	0	1	0	1	0	X	3

=== Draw 7 ===
Friday, January 19, 2:00 pm

Sheet 8	1	2	3	4	5	6	7	8	9	10	Final
Owen Purcell	0	0	1	0	2	0	0	1	0	1	5
Matthew Manuel 🔨	0	2	0	2	0	1	1	0	1	0	7

Sheet 4	1	2	3	4	5	6	7	8	9	10	Final
Colten Steele 🔨	1	0	1	1	3	0	0	0	0	2	8
Bryce Everist	0	2	0	0	0	2	1	1	0	0	6

=== Draw 8 ===
Friday, January 19, 7:00 pm

Sheet 8	1	2	3	4	5	6	7	8	9	10	Final
Owen Purcell	1	0	2	0	1	1	2	0	0	X	7
Stuart Thompson 🔨	0	1	0	2	0	0	0	1	1	X	5

=== Draw 9 ===
Saturday, January 20, 9:00 am

Sheet 2	1	2	3	4	5	6	7	8	9	10	Final
Stuart Thompson	0	0	2	0	0	1	0	1	0	1	5
Colten Steele 🔨	1	1	0	1	1	0	1	0	2	0	7

Sheet 4	1	2	3	4	5	6	7	8	9	10	Final
Paul Flemming	1	1	0	1	0	3	0	3	X	X	9
Brent MacDougall 🔨	0	0	0	0	1	0	1	0	X	X	2

== Playoffs ==
Page playoff system
1	Matthew Manuel	11
2	Owen Purcell	7
3	Colten Steele	3
4	Paul Flemming	6

Semifinal
2	Owen Purcell	10
4	Paul Flemming	2

Final
1	Matthew Manuel	8
2	Owen Purcell	2

=== 1 vs. 2 ===
Saturday, January 20, 7:00 pm

Sheet 8	1	2	3	4	5	6	7	8	9	10	Final
Matthew Manuel 🔨	2	0	2	0	2	0	3	0	2	X	11
Owen Purcell	0	2	0	2	0	1	0	2	0	X	7

=== 3 vs. 4 ===
Saturday, January 20, 2:00 pm

Sheet 8	1	2	3	4	5	6	7	8	9	10	Final
Colten Steele 🔨	0	1	0	0	0	1	0	1	0	0	3
Paul Flemming	0	0	2	1	2	0	0	0	0	1	6

=== Semifinal ===
Sunday, January 21, 9:00 am

Sheet 8	1	2	3	4	5	6	7	8	9	10	Final
Owen Purcell 🔨	2	1	0	1	1	0	3	2	X	X	10
Paul Flemming	0	0	1	0	0	1	0	0	X	X	2

=== Final ===
Sunday, January 21, 6:00 pm

Sheet 8	1	2	3	4	5	6	7	8	9	10	Final
Matthew Manuel 🔨	1	2	0	1	1	0	2	1	X	X	8
Owen Purcell	0	0	1	0	0	1	0	0	X	X	2

2024 Ocean Contractors Tankard

Matthew Manuel
2nd Nova Scotia Provincial Championship title
