= 2025 Stu Sells Toronto Tankard =

- Host city: Toronto, Ontario
- Arena: High Park Club
- Dates: October 1–6
- Men's winner: (Ontario) Team Kean
- Curling club: Woodstock CC, Woodstock
- Skip: Mark Kean
- Third: Brady Lumley
- Second: Matthew Garner
- Lead: Spencer Dunlop
- Finalist: (Scotland) Kyle Waddell
- Women's winner: (South Korea) Team Ha
- Curling club: Chuncheon CC, Chuncheon
- Skip: Ha Seung-youn
- Third: Kim Hye-rin
- Second: Yang Tae-i
- Lead: Kim Su-jin
- Alternate: Park Seo-jin
- Finalist: (Switzerland) Silvana Tirinzoni

The 2025 Stu Sells Toronto Tankard was held from October 1 to 6 at the High Park Club in Toronto. The event was held in a round robin format with a modified qualifying round for the playoffs, with a purse of $40,000 on both the men's side and the women's side. It was the second Stu Sells sponsored event held as part of the 2025–26 season.

== Men ==
=== Teams ===
The teams are listed as follows:

Skip	Third	Second	Lead	Alternate	Locale
Tetsuro Shimizu (Fourth)	Shinya Abe (Skip)	Haruto Ouchi	Hayato Sato	Sota Tsuruga	Sapporo, Japan
Jonathan Beuk	Pat Janssen	David Staples	Sean Harrison		Kingston, Ontario
Alex Champ	Ben Bevan	Matt Pretty	Travis Ackroyd		Toronto, Ontario
Pat Ferris	Travis Fanset	Rob Ainsley	Scott Clinton		Grimsby, Ontario
Mike Fournier	Charlie Richard	Punit Sthankiya	Graeme Robson		Toronto, Ontario
Kohsuke Hirata	Shingo Usui	Koei Sato	Ryota Meguro	Hirofumi Kobayashi	Kitami, Japan
Daniel Hocevar	Zander Elmes	Joel Matthews	Daniel Del Conte		Toronto, Ontario
Mark Kean	Brady Lumley	Matthew Garner	Spencer Dunlop		Woodstock, Ontario
Kim Soo-hyuk	Kim Chang-min	Yoo Min-hyeon	Kim Hak-kyun	Jeon Jae-ik	Uiseong, South Korea
Jayden King	Dylan Niepage	Owen Henry	Victor Pietrangelo		London, Ontario
Lukáš Klíma	Marek Černovský	Martin Jurík	Lukáš Klípa	Radek Boháč	Prague, Czech Republic
Lee Jae-beom	Lee Ki-jeong	Kim Min-woo	Kim Jeong-min		Seoul, South Korea
Tyler MacTavish	Owen Nicholls	Nathan Kim	Nate Thomas		Waterloo, Ontario
Takumi Maeda	Hiroki Maeda	Uryu Kamikawa	Gakuto Tokoro		Kitami, Japan
Matthew Manuel	Cameron MacKenzie	Jeffrey Meagher	Nick Zachernuk		Halifax, Nova Scotia
Félix Asselin (Fourth)	Jean-Michel Ménard (Skip)	Martin Crête	Jean-François Trépanier		Gatineau, Quebec
Kibo Mulima	Wesley Forget	Ed Cyr	Josh Leung	Wyatt Wright	Waterloo, Ontario
Park Jong-duk	Jeong Yeong-seok	Oh Seung-hoon	Lee Ki-bok	Seong Ji-hoon	Gangwon, South Korea
Owen Purcell	Luke Saunders	Gavin Lydiate	Ryan Abraham		Halifax, Nova Scotia
Magnus Ramsfjell	Martin Sesaker	Bendik Ramsfjell	Gaute Nepstad		Trondheim, Norway
Graham Singer	Doug Wright	Rob Gray	William Wright		Toronto, Ontario
Greg Smith	Carter Small	Scott Saccary	Sean O'Leary		St. John's, Newfoundland and Labrador
Kyle Waddell	Mark Watt	Angus Bryce	Blair Haswell		Hamilton, Scotland
Riku Yanagisawa (Fourth)	Tsuyoshi Yamaguchi (Skip)	Takeru Yamamoto	Satoshi Koizumi		Karuizawa, Japan

=== Round-Robin Standings ===
Final Round Robin Standings

Key
Teams to Qualifying Round

Pool A	W	L
(Czech Republic) Lukáš Klíma	3	0
(South Korea) Kim Soo-hyuk	2	1
(Nova Scotia) Owen Purcell	1	2
(Ontario) Alex Champ	0	3

Pool B	W	L
(Norway) Magnus Ramsfjell	3	0
(South Korea) Lee Jae-beom	1	2
(Ontario) Jonathan Beuk	1	2
(Ontario) Graham Singer	1	2

Pool C	W	L
(Scotland) Kyle Waddell	3	0
(Ontario) Daniel Hocevar	2	1
(Ontario) Tyler MacTavish	1	2
(Japan) Kohsuke Hirata	0	3

Pool D	W	L
(Ontario) Jayden King	3	0
(Ontario) Kibo Mulima	2	1
(Japan) Tsuyoshi Yamaguchi	1	2
(South Korea) Park Jong-duk	0	3

Pool E	W	L
(Ontario) Mike Fournier	3	0
(Ontario) Mark Kean	2	1
(Japan) Takumi Maeda	1	2
(Ontario) Pat Ferris	0	3

Pool F	W	L
(Quebec) Jean-Michel Ménard	3	0
(Nova Scotia) Matthew Manuel	1	2
(Japan) Shinya Abe	1	2
(Newfoundland and Labrador) Greg Smith	1	2

=== Round Robin Results ===
All draw times are listed in Eastern Time (UTC−04:00).

==== Draw 1 ====
Wednesday, October 1, 11:00 am

Sheet 1	1	2	3	4	5	6	7	8	9	Final
(Czech Republic) Lukáš Klíma	0	2	1	0	1	0	0	1	1	6
(South Korea) Kim Soo-hyuk 🔨	1	0	0	1	0	3	0	0	0	5

Sheet 2	1	2	3	4	5	6	7	8	Final
(Norway) Magnus Ramsfjell 🔨	1	0	1	1	0	1	0	2	6
(South Korea) Lee Jae-beom	0	1	0	0	2	0	1	0	4

==== Draw 2 ====
Wednesday, October 1, 2:30 pm

Sheet 3	1	2	3	4	5	6	7	8	Final
(Scotland) Kyle Waddell 🔨	0	4	1	2	0	1	X	X	8
(Japan) Kohsuke Hirata	2	0	0	0	1	0	X	X	3

Sheet 4	1	2	3	4	5	6	7	8	Final
(Japan) Tsuyoshi Yamaguchi 🔨	0	3	0	1	1	2	X	X	7
(South Korea) Park Jong-duk	1	0	0	0	0	0	X	X	1

==== Draw 3 ====
Thursday, October 2, 8:00 am

Sheet 1	1	2	3	4	5	6	7	8	Final
(Japan) Shinya Abe	0	0	0	0	1	0	1	0	2
(Quebec) Jean-Michel Ménard 🔨	0	0	0	1	0	2	0	1	4

Sheet 3	1	2	3	4	5	6	7	8	Final
(Ontario) Mark Kean 🔨	1	0	0	0	2	1	1	X	5
(Japan) Takumi Maeda	0	1	1	0	0	0	0	X	2

==== Draw 4 ====
Thursday, October 2, 11:15 am

Sheet 1	1	2	3	4	5	6	7	8	Final
(Ontario) Jonathan Beuk	0	3	0	0	3	0	0	X	6
(Ontario) Graham Singer 🔨	3	0	2	1	0	2	1	X	9

Sheet 3	1	2	3	4	5	6	7	8	9	Final
(Ontario) Alex Champ	0	2	0	2	0	0	2	1	0	7
(Nova Scotia) Owen Purcell 🔨	1	0	2	0	3	1	0	0	1	8

Sheet 4	1	2	3	4	5	6	7	8	Final
(Ontario) Jayden King	1	1	0	2	0	2	1	X	7
(Ontario) Kibo Mulima 🔨	0	0	2	0	2	0	0	X	4

==== Draw 5 ====
Thursday, October 2, 2:30 pm

Sheet 1	1	2	3	4	5	6	7	8	Final
(Nova Scotia) Matthew Manuel 🔨	0	0	2	0	0	4	3	X	9
(Newfoundland and Labrador) Greg Smith	0	0	0	2	1	0	0	X	3

Sheet 2	1	2	3	4	5	6	7	8	Final
(Ontario) Tyler MacTavish	0	0	0	0	0	X	X	X	0
(Scotland) Kyle Waddell 🔨	0	2	4	2	1	X	X	X	9

==== Draw 6 ====
Thursday, October 2, 6:30 pm

Sheet 2	1	2	3	4	5	6	7	8	9	Final
(Nova Scotia) Owen Purcell	0	1	0	2	0	2	0	2	0	7
(Czech Republic) Lukáš Klíma 🔨	2	0	3	0	1	0	1	0	1	8

Sheet 4	1	2	3	4	5	6	7	8	Final
(Ontario) Pat Ferris	0	0	1	1	0	0	X	X	2
(Ontario) Mike Fournier 🔨	2	3	0	0	2	1	X	X	8

Sheet 5	1	2	3	4	5	6	7	8	Final
(Norway) Magnus Ramsfjell 🔨	0	3	0	2	1	X	X	X	6
(Ontario) Jonathan Beuk	0	0	2	0	0	X	X	X	2

==== Draw 7 ====
Thursday, October 2, 9:30 pm

Sheet 1	1	2	3	4	5	6	7	8	Final
(Ontario) Daniel Hocevar	0	0	2	2	0	0	2	4	10
(Japan) Kohsuke Hirata 🔨	0	1	0	0	2	1	0	0	4

Sheet 2	1	2	3	4	5	6	7	8	Final
(Japan) Tsuyoshi Yamaguchi	0	1	0	0	1	X	X	X	2
(Ontario) Jayden King 🔨	2	0	3	1	0	X	X	X	6

==== Draw 8 ====
Friday, October 3, 8:00 am

Sheet 3	1	2	3	4	5	6	7	8	9	Final
(Nova Scotia) Matthew Manuel	0	1	0	0	3	0	0	2	0	6
(Japan) Shinya Abe 🔨	2	0	1	1	0	1	1	0	1	7

Sheet 4	1	2	3	4	5	6	7	8	Final
(Newfoundland and Labrador) Greg Smith	0	1	0	0	2	0	0	X	3
(Quebec) Jean-Michel Ménard 🔨	2	0	0	2	0	2	3	X	9

Sheet 5	1	2	3	4	5	6	7	8	Final
(Ontario) Kibo Mulima 🔨	1	0	0	0	2	1	1	2	7
(South Korea) Park Jong-duk	0	3	0	0	0	0	0	0	3

==== Draw 9 ====
Friday, October 3, 11:15 am

Sheet 4	1	2	3	4	5	6	7	8	Final
(Ontario) Mike Fournier 🔨	3	0	3	0	1	2	X	X	9
(Japan) Takumi Maeda	0	1	0	1	0	0	X	X	2

Sheet 5	1	2	3	4	5	6	7	8	9	Final
(South Korea) Lee Jae-beom 🔨	2	0	0	1	0	2	0	0	1	6
(Ontario) Graham Singer	0	1	1	0	1	0	0	2	0	5

==== Draw 10 ====
Friday, October 3, 2:30 pm

Sheet 3	1	2	3	4	5	6	7	8	Final
(Ontario) Jayden King 🔨	0	2	0	0	1	1	0	1	5
(South Korea) Park Jong-duk	0	0	0	2	0	0	1	0	3

Sheet 4	1	2	3	4	5	6	7	8	Final
(Ontario) Daniel Hocevar 🔨	1	1	0	0	1	0	1	0	4
(Scotland) Kyle Waddell	0	0	2	0	0	2	0	2	6

Sheet 5	1	2	3	4	5	6	7	8	Final
(Ontario) Tyler MacTavish 🔨	3	0	0	1	0	2	1	1	8
(Japan) Kohsuke Hirata	0	2	0	0	2	0	0	0	4

==== Draw 11 ====
Friday, October 3, 6:00 pm

Sheet 1	1	2	3	4	5	6	7	8	Final
(South Korea) Kim Soo-hyuk 🔨	2	0	0	0	3	0	0	1	6
(Ontario) Alex Champ	0	1	0	1	0	0	3	0	5

Sheet 4	1	2	3	4	5	6	7	8	Final
(Norway) Magnus Ramsfjell	1	1	2	0	2	1	X	X	7
(Ontario) Graham Singer 🔨	0	0	0	1	0	0	X	X	1

==== Draw 12 ====
Friday, October 3, 9:30 pm

Sheet 1	1	2	3	4	5	6	7	8	Final
(Ontario) Pat Ferris 🔨	1	2	0	0	2	0	0	0	5
(Ontario) Mark Kean	0	0	2	1	0	2	1	1	7

Sheet 3	1	2	3	4	5	6	7	8	Final
(South Korea) Lee Jae-beom 🔨	0	0	2	0	X	X	X	X	2
(Ontario) Jonathan Beuk	1	5	0	2	X	X	X	X	8

Sheet 5	1	2	3	4	5	6	7	8	Final
(Japan) Shinya Abe 🔨	0	2	0	0	0	0	2	X	4
(Newfoundland and Labrador) Greg Smith	0	0	3	1	1	1	0	X	6

==== Draw 14 ====
Saturday, October 4, 11:15 am

Sheet 1	1	2	3	4	5	6	7	8	Final
(Ontario) Kibo Mulima	0	1	0	0	1	2	0	1	5
(Japan) Tsuyoshi Yamaguchi 🔨	0	0	1	1	0	0	2	0	4

Sheet 2	1	2	3	4	5	6	7	8	Final
(Nova Scotia) Matthew Manuel	0	0	0	2	0	0	1	1	4
(Quebec) Jean-Michel Ménard 🔨	0	3	0	0	2	0	0	0	5

Sheet 3	1	2	3	4	5	6	7	8	Final
(Ontario) Tyler MacTavish	0	1	0	0	0	2	0	1	4
(Ontario) Daniel Hocevar 🔨	2	0	2	1	1	0	1	0	7

==== Draw 15 ====
Saturday, October 4, 2:30 pm

Sheet 2	1	2	3	4	5	6	7	8	Final
(Ontario) Mike Fournier 🔨	1	1	1	0	3	1	X	X	7
(Ontario) Mark Kean	0	0	0	1	0	0	X	X	1

Sheet 3	1	2	3	4	5	6	7	8	Final
(Ontario) Alex Champ	0	1	0	1	0	0	X	X	2
(Czech Republic) Lukáš Klíma 🔨	3	0	1	0	1	2	X	X	7

Sheet 4	1	2	3	4	5	6	7	8	Final
(South Korea) Kim Soo-hyuk	0	0	0	0	1	2	0	1	4
(Nova Scotia) Owen Purcell 🔨	0	0	0	1	0	0	1	0	2

Sheet 5	1	2	3	4	5	6	7	8	Final
(Ontario) Pat Ferris 🔨	2	1	0	2	0	0	0	0	5
(Japan) Takumi Maeda	0	0	2	0	2	0	2	1	7

=== Qualification Round ===
Qualifier 1
1	(Ontario) Mike Fournier	8
8	(Ontario) Kibo Mulima	5

Qualifier 2
2	(Scotland) Kyle Waddell	9
7	(Ontario) Daniel Hocevar	1

Qualifier 3
3	(Czech Republic) Lukáš Klíma	4
6	(Quebec) Jean-Michel Ménard	5

Qualifier 4
4	(Norway) Magnus Ramsfjell	2
5	(Ontario) Jayden King	7

			Qualifier 5
			8	(Ontario) Kibo Mulima	5
9	(Ontario) Mark Kean	7	9	(Ontario) Mark Kean	8
16	(South Korea) Lee Jae-beom	0

			Qualifier 6
			3	(Czech Republic) Lukáš Klíma	7
12	(Nova Scotia) Matthew Manuel	7	12	(Nova Scotia) Matthew Manuel	5
13	(Nova Scotia) Owen Purcell	6

			Qualifier 7
			4	(Norway) Magnus Ramsfjell	7
11	(Japan) Tsuyoshi Yamaguchi	5	11	(Japan) Tsuyoshi Yamaguchi	4
14	(Ontario) Tyler MacTavish	2

			Qualifier 8
			7	(Ontario) Daniel Hocevar	6
10	(South Korea) Kim Soo-hyuk	8	10	(South Korea) Kim Soo-hyuk	3
15	(Japan) Takumi Maeda	7

==== Qualification Round 1 ====
Saturday, October 4, 9:30 pm

Sheet 1	1	2	3	4	5	6	7	8	Final
(Scotland) Kyle Waddell 🔨	3	0	1	0	5	X	X	X	9
(Ontario) Daniel Hocevar	0	0	0	1	0	X	X	X	1

Sheet 2	1	2	3	4	5	6	7	8	Final
(Norway) Magnus Ramsfjell 🔨	0	1	0	1	0	0	X	X	2
(Ontario) Jayden King	0	0	2	0	4	1	X	X	7

Sheet 3	1	2	3	4	5	6	7	8	Final
(Ontario) Mike Fournier 🔨	0	3	0	3	1	0	1	X	8
(Ontario) Kibo Mulima	0	0	2	0	0	3	0	X	5

Sheet 4	1	2	3	4	5	6	7	8	9	Final
(Czech Republic) Lukáš Klíma 🔨	0	1	0	2	0	0	0	1	0	4
(Quebec) Jean-Michel Ménard	0	0	2	0	0	2	0	0	1	5

==== Qualification Round 2 ====
Sunday, October 5, 11:15 am

Sheet 1	1	2	3	4	5	6	7	8	Final
(South Korea) Kim Soo-hyuk 🔨	0	3	0	0	2	0	3	0	8
(Japan) Takumi Maeda	0	0	0	2	0	4	0	1	7

Sheet 2	1	2	3	4	5	6	7	8	Final
(Japan) Tsuyoshi Yamaguchi 🔨	1	0	1	0	0	3	0	X	5
(Ontario) Tyler MacTavish	0	0	0	2	0	0	0	X	2

Sheet 3	1	2	3	4	5	6	7	8	9	Final
(Nova Scotia) Matthew Manuel 🔨	1	0	2	0	1	0	2	0	1	7
(Nova Scotia) Owen Purcell	0	1	0	1	0	2	0	2	0	6

Sheet 4	1	2	3	4	5	6	7	8	Final
(Ontario) Mark Kean 🔨	4	1	2	X	X	X	X	X	7
(South Korea) Lee Jae-beom	0	0	0	X	X	X	X	X	0

==== Qualification Round 3 ====
Sunday, October 5, 6:00 pm

Sheet 2	1	2	3	4	5	6	7	8	Final
(Ontario) Kibo Mulima	0	2	0	1	0	0	2	0	5
(Ontario) Mark Kean 🔨	1	0	2	0	1	2	0	2	8

Sheet 3	1	2	3	4	5	6	7	8	Final
(Norway) Magnus Ramsfjell 🔨	2	0	0	0	0	1	0	4	7
(Japan) Tsuyoshi Yamaguchi	0	1	0	0	1	0	2	0	4

Sheet 4	1	2	3	4	5	6	7	8	Final
(Ontario) Daniel Hocevar	0	0	1	0	2	2	0	1	6
(South Korea) Kim Soo-hyuk 🔨	0	1	0	1	0	0	1	0	3

Sheet 5	1	2	3	4	5	6	7	8	Final
(Czech Republic) Lukáš Klíma 🔨	2	1	0	1	0	1	0	2	7
(Nova Scotia) Matthew Manuel	0	0	1	0	3	0	1	0	5

=== Playoffs ===
Quarterfinals
1	(Ontario) Mike Fournier	5
8	(Ontario) Mark Kean	7
4	(Quebec) Jean-Michel Ménard	6
5	(Czech Republic) Lukáš Klíma	4
2	(Scotland) Kyle Waddell	5
7	(Ontario) Daniel Hocevar	2
3	(Ontario) Jayden King	2
6	(Norway) Magnus Ramsfjell	7

Semifinals
8	(Ontario) Mark Kean	7
4	(Quebec) Jean-Michel Ménard	1
2	(Scotland) Kyle Waddell	7
6	(Norway) Magnus Ramsfjell	3

Final
8	(Ontario) Mark Kean	7
2	(Scotland) Kyle Waddell	6

==== Quarterfinals ====
Sunday, October 5, 9:30 pm

Sheet 1	1	2	3	4	5	6	7	8	Final
(Ontario) Mike Fournier 🔨	2	0	1	0	2	0	0	0	5
(Ontario) Mark Kean	0	2	0	1	0	2	1	1	7

Monday, October 6, 8:30 am

Sheet 2	1	2	3	4	5	6	7	8	Final
(Ontario) Jayden King 🔨	0	1	0	0	1	0	X	X	2
(Norway) Magnus Ramsfjell	1	0	0	3	0	3	X	X	7

Sheet 4	1	2	3	4	5	6	7	8	Final
(Quebec) Jean-Michel Ménard 🔨	0	2	0	0	1	0	3	0	6
(Czech Republic) Lukáš Klíma	0	0	1	1	0	1	0	1	4

Sheet 5	1	2	3	4	5	6	7	8	Final
(Scotland) Kyle Waddell 🔨	1	0	1	0	1	0	0	2	5
(Ontario) Daniel Hocevar	0	1	0	1	0	0	0	0	2

==== Semifinals ====
Monday, October 6, 12:30 pm

Sheet 3	1	2	3	4	5	6	7	8	Final
(Ontario) Mark Kean	0	1	1	0	1	2	2	X	7
(Quebec) Jean-Michel Ménard 🔨	0	0	0	1	0	0	0	X	1

Sheet 4	1	2	3	4	5	6	7	8	Final
(Scotland) Kyle Waddell	0	2	0	2	3	0	X	X	7
(Norway) Magnus Ramsfjell 🔨	1	0	1	0	0	1	X	X	3

==== Final ====
Monday, October 6, 4:00 pm

Team	1	2	3	4	5	6	7	8	Final
(Ontario) Mark Kean	0	3	0	0	1	2	0	1	7
(Scotland) Kyle Waddell 🔨	1	0	2	1	0	0	2	0	6

== Women ==
=== Teams ===
The teams are listed as follows:

Skip	Third	Second	Lead	Alternate	Locale
Hailey Armstrong	Grace Lloyd	Michaela Robert	Rachel Steele	Grace Cave	Whitby, Ontario
Emma Artichuk	Jamie Smith	Evelyn Robert	Lauren Rajala		Waterloo, Ontario
Stefania Constantini	Giulia Zardini Lacedelli	Elena Mathis	Marta Lo Deserto (Note: Alternate Marta Lo Deserto played lead, replacing Angela Romei.)		Cortina d'Ampezzo, Italy
Jessica Corrado	Marteen Jones	Angela Burghout	Candice Johnston		Russell, Ontario
Kathleen Dubberstein	Leilani Dubberstein	Jessica Byers	Lindsey Schmalz		Manila, Philippines
Hollie Duncan	Megan Balsdon	Rachelle Strybosch	Tess Guyatt		Woodstock, Ontario
Madeleine Dupont	Mathilde Halse	Denise Dupont	My Larsen	Jasmin Holtermann	Hvidovre, Denmark
Mélodie Forsythe	Rebecca Watson	Carly Smith	Jenna Campbell		Fredericton, New Brunswick
Satsuki Fujisawa	Chinami Yoshida	Yumi Suzuki	Yurika Yoshida		Kitami, Japan
Ha Seung-youn	Kim Hye-rin	Yang Tae-i	Kim Su-jin	Park Seo-jin	Chuncheon, South Korea
Carly Howard	Katelyn Wasylkiw	Lynn Kreviazuk	Laura Hickey		Toronto, Ontario
Corrie Hürlimann	Marina Lörtscher	Stefanie Berset	Celine Schwizgebel		Zug, Switzerland
Kang Bo-bae	Shim Yu-jeong	Kim Min-seo	Kim Ji-soo	Lee Bo-young	Jeonbuk, South Korea
Kim Eun-jung	Kim Kyeong-ae	Kim Cho-hi	Kim Yeong-mi (Note: Alternate Kim Yeong-mi played lead, replacing Kim Seon-yeong who was competing on the Ontario mixed doubles tour.)		Gangneung, South Korea
Ikue Kitazawa	Seina Nakajima	Minori Suzuki	Hasumi Ishigooka		Nagano, Japan
Émilie Lovitt	Celeste Gauthier	Paige Bown	Sarah Leung		Navan, Ontario
Julia Markle	Scotia Maltman	Tori Zemmelink	Sadie McCutcheon		Toronto, Ontario
Chelsea Principi	Lauren Peskett	Brenda Chapman	Keira McLaughlin		Niagara Falls, Ontario
Breanna Rozon	Chrissy Cadorin	Stephanie Thompson	Leigh Armstrong		Oshawa, Ontario
Krista Scharf	Kendra Lilly	Ashley Sippala	Sarah Potts		Thunder Bay, Ontario
Xenia Schwaller	Selina Gafner	Fabienne Rieder	Selina Rychiger		Zurich, Switzerland
Momoha Tabata (Fourth)	Miku Nihira (Skip) (Note: Miku Nihira skipped Team Tabata.)	Sae Yamamoto	Mikoto Nakajima		Sapporo, Japan
Alina Pätz (Fourth)	Silvana Tirinzoni (Skip)	Carole Howald	Selina Witschonke		Aarau, Switzerland
Sayaka Yoshimura	Kaho Onodera	Yuna Kotani	Anna Ohmiya	Mina Kobayashi	Sapporo, Japan

=== Round-Robin Standings ===
Final Round Robin Standings

Key
Teams to Qualifying Round

Pool A	W	L
(South Korea) Kim Eun-jung	2	1
(Ontario) Chelsea Principi	2	1
(Ontario) Émilie Lovitt	1	2
(Denmark) Madeleine Dupont	1	2

Pool B	W	L
(Japan) Ikue Kitazawa	3	0
(Ontario) Hollie Duncan	1	2
(Japan) Sayaka Yoshimura	1	2
(Ontario) Jessica Corrado	1	2

Pool C	W	L
(Ontario) Emma Artichuk	2	1
(South Korea) Kang Bo-bae	2	1
(Japan) Satsuki Fujisawa	2	1
(Philippines) Kathleen Dubberstein	0	3

Pool D	W	L
(South Korea) Ha Seung-youn	3	0
(Italy) Stefania Constantini	2	1
(New Brunswick) Mélodie Forsythe	1	2
(Ontario) Breanna Rozon	0	3

Pool E	W	L
(Switzerland) Xenia Schwaller	3	0
(Ontario) Hailey Armstrong	2	1
(Ontario) Carly Howard	1	2
(Japan) Team Tabata	0	3

Pool F	W	L
(Switzerland) Silvana Tirinzoni	3	0
(Ontario) Krista Scharf	2	1
(Switzerland) Corrie Hürlimann	1	2
(Ontario) Julia Markle	0	3

=== Round Robin Results ===
All draw times are listed in Eastern Time (UTC−04:00).

==== Draw 1 ====
Wednesday, October 1, 12:00 pm

Sheet 3	1	2	3	4	5	6	7	8	Final
(Denmark) Madeleine Dupont	1	1	1	0	0	0	1	1	5
(South Korea) Kim Eun-jung 🔨	0	0	0	2	1	1	0	0	4

Sheet 4	1	2	3	4	5	6	7	8	9	Final
(Japan) Sayaka Yoshimura	0	0	1	1	0	1	0	1	0	4
(Japan) Ikue Kitazawa 🔨	0	2	0	0	2	0	0	0	1	5

==== Draw 2 ====
Wednesday, October 1, 2:30 pm

Sheet 1	1	2	3	4	5	6	7	8	Final
(Japan) Satsuki Fujisawa	0	1	1	0	0	0	X	X	2
(South Korea) Kang Bo-bae 🔨	2	0	0	1	4	1	X	X	8

Sheet 2	1	2	3	4	5	6	7	8	Final
(South Korea) Ha Seung-youn	0	2	0	4	0	2	X	X	8
(Italy) Stefania Constantini 🔨	0	0	1	0	1	0	X	X	2

==== Draw 3 ====
Thursday, October 2, 8:00 am

Sheet 2	1	2	3	4	5	6	7	8	9	Final
(Ontario) Hollie Duncan 🔨	1	0	2	0	0	0	1	1	0	5
(Ontario) Jessica Corrado	0	1	0	1	0	3	0	0	2	7

Sheet 4	1	2	3	4	5	6	7	8	Final
(Switzerland) Xenia Schwaller 🔨	2	0	2	0	2	0	1	X	7
(Japan) Team Tabata	0	1	0	1	0	1	0	X	3

Sheet 5	1	2	3	4	5	6	7	8	Final
(Switzerland) Silvana Tirinzoni 🔨	0	0	2	1	1	2	0	X	6
(Switzerland) Corrie Hürlimann	0	1	0	0	0	0	1	X	2

==== Draw 4 ====
Thursday, October 2, 11:15 am

Sheet 2	1	2	3	4	5	6	7	8	Final
(Philippines) Kathleen Dubberstein 🔨	1	0	1	0	0	0	X	X	2
(South Korea) Kang Bo-bae	0	2	0	4	2	2	X	X	10

Sheet 5	1	2	3	4	5	6	7	8	Final
(Ontario) Breanna Rozon	1	0	1	0	3	0	1	0	6
(New Brunswick) Mélodie Forsythe 🔨	0	3	0	1	0	1	0	4	9

==== Draw 5 ====
Thursday, October 2, 2:30 pm

Sheet 3	1	2	3	4	5	6	7	8	Final
(Japan) Team Tabata	0	0	1	0	1	0	1	1	4
(Ontario) Hailey Armstrong 🔨	2	1	0	0	0	2	0	0	5

Sheet 4	1	2	3	4	5	6	7	8	Final
(Switzerland) Silvana Tirinzoni 🔨	6	0	3	1	X	X	X	X	10
(Ontario) Julia Markle	0	1	0	0	X	X	X	X	1

Sheet 5	1	2	3	4	5	6	7	8	Final
(South Korea) Kim Eun-jung 🔨	4	0	0	3	0	0	1	X	8
(Ontario) Chelsea Principi	0	1	2	0	1	1	0	X	5

==== Draw 6 ====
Thursday, October 2, 6:30 pm

Sheet 1	1	2	3	4	5	6	7	8	Final
(Ontario) Émilie Lovitt 🔨	0	0	2	1	1	0	0	3	7
(Denmark) Madeleine Dupont	0	2	0	0	0	1	1	0	4

Sheet 3	1	2	3	4	5	6	7	8	Final
(Ontario) Carly Howard	0	0	1	1	0	0	X	X	2
(Switzerland) Xenia Schwaller 🔨	0	3	0	0	3	3	X	X	9

==== Draw 7 ====
Thursday, October 2, 9:30 pm

Sheet 3	1	2	3	4	5	6	7	8	9	Final
(Japan) Satsuki Fujisawa 🔨	2	0	1	0	0	2	0	0	2	7
(Ontario) Emma Artichuk	0	2	0	1	0	0	0	2	0	5

Sheet 4	1	2	3	4	5	6	7	8	Final
(South Korea) Ha Seung-youn 🔨	2	0	0	3	4	X	X	X	9
(Ontario) Breanna Rozon	0	1	0	0	0	X	X	X	1

Sheet 5	1	2	3	4	5	6	7	8	9	Final
(Japan) Sayaka Yoshimura	0	0	0	0	1	0	1	1	0	3
(Ontario) Hollie Duncan 🔨	0	0	1	1	0	1	0	0	2	5

==== Draw 8 ====
Friday, October 3, 8:00 am

Sheet 1	1	2	3	4	5	6	7	8	Final
(Ontario) Jessica Corrado	0	0	2	0	1	0	0	X	3
(Japan) Ikue Kitazawa 🔨	0	3	0	2	0	1	1	X	7

Sheet 2	1	2	3	4	5	6	7	8	Final
(Ontario) Chelsea Principi	0	2	0	0	2	1	2	X	7
(Ontario) Émilie Lovitt 🔨	1	0	2	0	0	0	0	X	3

==== Draw 9 ====
Friday, October 3, 11:15 am

Sheet 1	1	2	3	4	5	6	7	8	Final
(Ontario) Emma Artichuk	0	1	3	0	0	1	3	X	8
(Philippines) Kathleen Dubberstein 🔨	1	0	0	0	1	0	0	X	2

Sheet 2	1	2	3	4	5	6	7	8	Final
(New Brunswick) Mélodie Forsythe	0	0	1	0	1	0	X	X	2
(Italy) Stefania Constantini 🔨	2	1	0	4	0	2	X	X	9

Sheet 3	1	2	3	4	5	6	7	8	Final
(Ontario) Krista Scharf 🔨	0	1	0	4	0	0	3	X	8
(Ontario) Julia Markle	0	0	1	0	1	1	0	X	3

==== Draw 10 ====
Friday, October 3, 2:30 pm

Sheet 1	1	2	3	4	5	6	7	8	Final
(Ontario) Carly Howard	0	0	1	0	0	1	0	0	2
(Ontario) Hailey Armstrong 🔨	0	1	0	0	1	0	1	1	4

Sheet 2	1	2	3	4	5	6	7	8	Final
(Ontario) Julia Markle	0	1	0	1	0	0	X	X	2
(Switzerland) Corrie Hürlimann 🔨	1	0	3	0	2	1	X	X	7

==== Draw 11 ====
Friday, October 3, 6:00 pm

Sheet 2	1	2	3	4	5	6	7	8	Final
(Switzerland) Silvana Tirinzoni	0	5	0	0	4	X	X	X	9
(Ontario) Krista Scharf 🔨	1	0	1	1	0	X	X	X	3

Sheet 3	1	2	3	4	5	6	7	8	9	Final
(Ontario) Émilie Lovitt 🔨	4	0	1	0	0	1	0	1	0	7
(South Korea) Kim Eun-jung	0	4	0	1	1	0	1	0	1	8

Sheet 5	1	2	3	4	5	6	7	8	Final
(Denmark) Madeleine Dupont	0	1	0	0	X	X	X	X	1
(Ontario) Chelsea Principi 🔨	2	0	2	3	X	X	X	X	7

==== Draw 12 ====
Friday, October 3, 9:30 pm

Sheet 2	1	2	3	4	5	6	7	8	Final
(Ontario) Hollie Duncan 🔨	0	0	1	0	1	0	1	X	3
(Japan) Ikue Kitazawa	2	1	0	1	0	2	0	X	6

Sheet 4	1	2	3	4	5	6	7	8	Final
(Japan) Sayaka Yoshimura	3	2	0	0	1	0	1	X	7
(Ontario) Jessica Corrado 🔨	0	0	2	1	0	1	0	X	4

==== Draw 13 ====
Saturday, October 4, 8:00 am

Sheet 1	1	2	3	4	5	6	7	8	Final
(South Korea) Ha Seung-youn	2	2	3	1	X	X	X	X	8
(New Brunswick) Mélodie Forsythe 🔨	0	0	0	0	X	X	X	X	0

Sheet 2	1	2	3	4	5	6	7	8	9	Final
(Japan) Team Tabata	0	1	0	1	0	1	0	1	0	4
(Ontario) Carly Howard 🔨	2	0	1	0	0	0	1	0	2	6

Sheet 3	1	2	3	4	5	6	7	8	Final
(Switzerland) Corrie Hürlimann	0	0	1	0	1	0	2	X	4
(Ontario) Krista Scharf 🔨	1	1	0	2	0	2	0	X	6

Sheet 4	1	2	3	4	5	6	7	8	Final
(Japan) Satsuki Fujisawa	1	2	0	0	2	2	1	X	8
(Philippines) Kathleen Dubberstein 🔨	0	0	2	1	0	0	0	X	3

Sheet 5	1	2	3	4	5	6	7	8	Final
(Italy) Stefania Constantini 🔨	0	1	0	1	1	0	3	X	6
(Ontario) Breanna Rozon	0	0	1	0	0	0	0	X	1

==== Draw 14 ====
Saturday, October 4, 11:15 am

Sheet 4	1	2	3	4	5	6	7	8	Final
(Ontario) Emma Artichuk 🔨	1	0	3	0	0	1	0	2	7
(South Korea) Kang Bo-bae	0	3	0	1	1	0	1	0	6

Sheet 5	1	2	3	4	5	6	7	8	Final
(Switzerland) Xenia Schwaller	1	0	0	3	1	1	1	X	7
(Ontario) Hailey Armstrong 🔨	0	1	1	0	0	0	0	X	2

=== Qualification Round ===
Qualifier 1
1	(Japan) Ikue Kitazawa	5
8	(South Korea) Kim Eun-jung	6

Qualifier 2
2	(Switzerland) Xenia Schwaller	6
7	(Ontario) Emma Artichuk	9

Qualifier 3
3	(Switzerland) Silvana Tirinzoni	5
6	(Ontario) Krista Scharf	1

Qualifier 4
4	(South Korea) Ha Seung-youn	5
5	(Italy) Stefania Constantini	8

			Qualifier 5
			6	(Ontario) Krista Scharf	7
9	(Ontario) Hailey Armstrong	4	9	(Ontario) Hailey Armstrong	2
16	(Ontario) Émilie Lovitt	3

			Qualifier 6
			2	(Switzerland) Xenia Schwaller	8
12	(Japan) Satsuki Fujisawa	6	12	(Japan) Satsuki Fujisawa	3
13	(New Brunswick) Mélodie Forsythe	3

			Qualifier 7
			1	(Japan) Ikue Kitazawa	7
11	(Ontario) Chelsea Principi	4	14	(Ontario) Carly Howard	5
14	(Ontario) Carly Howard	6

			Qualifier 8
			4	(South Korea) Ha Seung-youn	6
10	(South Korea) Kang Bo-bae	7	10	(South Korea) Kang Bo-bae	5
15	(Ontario) Hollie Duncan	0

==== Qualification Round 1 ====
Saturday, October 4, 6:00 pm

Sheet 1	1	2	3	4	5	6	7	8	Final
(Switzerland) Silvana Tirinzoni 🔨	3	1	1	0	X	X	X	X	5
(Ontario) Krista Scharf	0	0	0	1	X	X	X	X	1

Sheet 2	1	2	3	4	5	6	7	8	9	Final
(Switzerland) Xenia Schwaller 🔨	0	1	0	2	0	2	0	1	0	6
(Ontario) Emma Artichuk	1	0	3	0	1	0	1	0	3	9

Sheet 3	1	2	3	4	5	6	7	8	9	Final
(Japan) Ikue Kitazawa 🔨	0	2	0	2	0	1	0	0	0	5
(South Korea) Kim Eun-jung	0	0	2	0	2	0	0	1	1	6

Sheet 4	1	2	3	4	5	6	7	8	Final
(South Korea) Ha Seung-youn 🔨	1	0	3	0	0	1	0	X	5
(Italy) Stefania Constantini	0	5	0	1	1	0	1	X	8

==== Qualification Round 2 ====
Sunday, October 5, 8:00 am

Team	1	2	3	4	5	6	7	8	Final
(South Korea) Kang Bo-bae 🔨	0	2	3	2	X	X	X	X	7
(Ontario) Hollie Duncan	0	0	0	0	X	X	X	X	0

Team	1	2	3	4	5	6	7	8	Final
(Japan) Satsuki Fujisawa 🔨	3	1	0	1	0	0	1	X	6
(New Brunswick) Mélodie Forsythe	0	0	1	0	1	1	0	X	3

Team	1	2	3	4	5	6	7	8	Final
(Ontario) Chelsea Principi 🔨	0	1	0	0	2	0	1	0	4
(Ontario) Carly Howard	2	0	0	1	0	1	0	2	6

Team	1	2	3	4	5	6	7	8	Final
(Ontario) Hailey Armstrong 🔨	1	0	1	2	0	0	0	0	4
(Ontario) Émilie Lovitt	0	1	0	0	0	1	0	1	3

==== Qualification Round 3 ====
Sunday, October 5, 2:30 pm

Sheet 2	1	2	3	4	5	6	7	8	Final
(Ontario) Krista Scharf 🔨	2	0	3	0	2	X	X	X	7
(Ontario) Hailey Armstrong	0	1	0	1	0	X	X	X	2

Sheet 3	1	2	3	4	5	6	7	8	Final
(Switzerland) Xenia Schwaller 🔨	0	2	0	1	2	2	1	X	8
(Japan) Satsuki Fujisawa	0	0	3	0	0	0	0	X	3

Sheet 4	1	2	3	4	5	6	7	8	Final
(South Korea) Ha Seung-youn 🔨	0	1	1	0	2	0	1	1	6
(South Korea) Kang Bo-bae	1	0	0	3	0	1	0	0	5

Sheet 5	1	2	3	4	5	6	7	8	Final
(Japan) Ikue Kitazawa 🔨	2	0	0	2	0	2	1	X	7
(Ontario) Carly Howard	0	3	0	0	2	0	0	X	5

=== Playoffs ===
Quarterfinals
1	(Switzerland) Silvana Tirinzoni	6
8	(Ontario) Krista Scharf	1
4	(South Korea) Kim Eun-jung	9
5	(Japan) Ikue Kitazawa	7
2	(Italy) Stefania Constantini	4
7	(South Korea) Ha Seung-youn	7
3	(Ontario) Emma Artichuk	9
6	(Switzerland) Xenia Schwaller	3

Semifinals
1	(Switzerland) Silvana Tirinzoni	8
4	(South Korea) Kim Eun-jung	4
7	(South Korea) Ha Seung-youn	9
3	(Ontario) Emma Artichuk	3

Final
1	(Switzerland) Silvana Tirinzoni	4
7	(South Korea) Ha Seung-youn	5

==== Quarterfinals ====
Sunday, October 5, 9:30 pm

Sheet 2	1	2	3	4	5	6	7	8	Final
(Ontario) Emma Artichuk 🔨	1	0	4	0	1	0	3	X	9
(Switzerland) Xenia Schwaller	0	0	0	1	0	2	0	X	3

Sheet 3	1	2	3	4	5	6	7	8	Final
(Switzerland) Silvana Tirinzoni 🔨	0	0	0	3	1	0	2	X	6
(Ontario) Krista Scharf	0	0	1	0	0	0	0	X	1

Sheet 4	1	2	3	4	5	6	7	8	Final
(South Korea) Kim Eun-jung 🔨	2	2	3	0	2	0	0	X	9
(Japan) Ikue Kitazawa	0	0	0	3	0	2	2	X	7

Sheet 5	1	2	3	4	5	6	7	8	Final
(Italy) Stefania Constantini 🔨	2	0	0	0	1	0	1	0	4
(South Korea) Ha Seung-youn	0	2	0	0	0	3	0	2	7

==== Semifinals ====
Monday, October 6, 8:30 am

Sheet 1	1	2	3	4	5	6	7	8	Final
(Switzerland) Silvana Tirinzoni 🔨	3	0	2	0	3	X	X	X	8
(South Korea) Kim Eun-jung	0	2	0	2	0	X	X	X	4

Sheet 3	1	2	3	4	5	6	7	8	Final
(South Korea) Ha Seung-youn	0	2	0	2	1	0	4	X	9
(Ontario) Emma Artichuk 🔨	0	0	1	0	0	2	0	X	3

==== Final ====
Monday, October 6, 12:30 pm

Sheet 2	1	2	3	4	5	6	7	8	Final
(Switzerland) Silvana Tirinzoni 🔨	2	0	2	0	0	0	0	0	4
(South Korea) Ha Seung-youn	0	1	0	1	0	1	1	1	5
