= 2023 Nova Scotia Tankard =

- Host city: New Glasgow, Nova Scotia
- Arena: Bluenose Curling Club
- Dates: January 25–30
- Winner: Team Manuel
- Curling club: Halifax CC, Halifax
- Skip: Matthew Manuel
- Third: Luke Saunders
- Second: Jeffrey Meagher
- Lead: Nick Zachernuk
- Coach: Kevin Patterson
- Finalist: Owen Purcell

The 2023 Nova Scotia Tankard, the provincial men's curling championship for Nova Scotia, was held from January 25 to 30 at the Bluenose Curling Club in New Glasgow, Nova Scotia. The event was held in conjunction with the 2023 Nova Scotia Scotties Tournament of Hearts, the women's provincial championship.

The winning Matthew Manuel rink represented Nova Scotia at the 2023 Tim Hortons Brier in London, Ontario where they finished sixth in Pool A with a 3–5 record.

This was the first time the event has been held since 2020 due to the COVID-19 pandemic.

Unlike previous tournaments, there was no preliminary round to qualify for the provincial championship. Any team was able to register to compete in the championship.

== Teams ==
The teams are listed as follows:

Skip	Third	Second	Lead	Alternate	Club
Peter Burgess	Andrew Burgess	Todd Burgess	Kelly Mittelstadt		Truro CC, Truro
Travis Colter	Cameron MacKenzie	Ian Juurlink	Robert McLean		Dartmouth CC, Dartmouth
Nick Deagle	Jason van Vonderen	Robert Phillips	Nick MacInnis	Ryan Sperry	Bridgewater CC, Bridgewater
Bryce Everist	Paul Dexter	Chris MacRae	Taylor Ardiel		Halifax CC, Halifax
Ian Fitzner-Leblanc	Christopher McDonah	Mark Robar	Alex McDonah		Unaffiliated
Paul Flemming	Scott Saccary	Ryan Abraham	Philip Crowell		Halifax CC, Halifax
Andrew Gibson	Mike Flemming	Mike Bardsley	Kris Granchelli		Mayflower CC, Halifax
Pete Heck	Josh Kroker	Simon Maltby	Simon Labine		Truro CC, Truro
Glen MacLeod	Craig Burgess	Kevin Ouellette	Peter Neily		Halifax CC, Halifax
Matthew Manuel	Luke Saunders	Jeffrey Meagher	Nick Zachernuk		Halifax CC, Halifax
Owen Purcell	Joel Krats	Adam McEachren	Scott Weagle		Halifax CC, Halifax
Tom Sullivan	Brent MacDougall	Kirk MacDiarmid	Martin Gavin		Halifax CC, Halifax; Mayflower CC, Halifax
Stuart Thompson	Kendal Thompson	Colten Steele	Michael Brophy		Dartmouth CC, Dartmouth

== Knockout brackets ==
=== A event ===
First Knockout	Qualifier 1
Travis Colter	2
Paul Flemming	10	Paul Flemming	9
Andrew Gibson	3	Paul Flemming	7
Stuart Thompson	6
Stuart Thompson	7
Tom Sullivan	6	Ian Fitzner-Leblanc	5
Ian Fitzner-Leblanc	7	Paul Flemming	4
Owen Purcell	5
Owen Purcell	9
Nick Deagle	9	Nick Deagle	2
Glen MacLeod	5	Owen Purcell	8
Bryce Everist	7	Peter Burgess	3
Pete Heck	5	Bryce Everist	9
Matthew Manuel	7	Peter Burgess	10
Peter Burgess	10

=== B event ===
Second Knockout	Qualifier 2
Paul Flemming	9
Matthew Manuel	10
Peter Burgess	3
Matthew Manuel	8
Matthew Manuel	8
Travis Colter	5
Matthew Manuel	10
Glen MacLeod	9
Ian Fitzner-Leblanc	6
Glen MacLeod	8	Glen MacLeod	7
Pete Heck	7	Matthew Manuel	6
Owen Purcell	3
Owen Purcell	6
Stuart Thompson	3
Stuart Thompson	10
Bryce Everist	3
Bryce Everist	8
Tom Sullivan	2
Nick Deagle	6
Andrew Gibson	1	Tom Sullivan	7
Tom Sullivan	9

=== C event ===
Third Knockout	To Qualifier 3
Matthew Manuel	10
Travis Colter	5
Stuart Thompson	6
Travis Colter	8
Peter Burgess	7
Travis Colter	9
Tom Sullivan	8
Travis Colter	6	Travis Colter	9
Ian Fitzner-Leblanc	3

Third Knockout	To Qualifier 3
Owen Purcell	7
Paul Flemming	8
Paul Flemming	5
Bryce Everist	2
Qualifier 3
Bryce Everist	12	Matthew Manuel	10
Glen MacLeod	6	Paul Flemming	5
Glen MacLeod	8
Andrew Gibson	1
Nick Deagle	5
Pete Heck	6	Andrew Gibson	9
Andrew Gibson	12

== Knockout results ==
All draw times listed in Atlantic Time (UTC−04:00).

=== Draw 1 ===
Wednesday, January 25, 12:00 pm

Sheet 1	1	2	3	4	5	6	7	8	9	10	Final
Paul Flemming	0	4	1	3	0	2	X	X	X	X	10
Andrew Gibson	1	0	0	0	2	0	X	X	X	X	3

Sheet 2	1	2	3	4	5	6	7	8	9	10	Final
Tom Sullivan	0	2	0	1	0	0	1	1	0	1	6
Ian Fitzner-Leblanc	1	0	1	0	2	1	0	0	2	0	7

Sheet 3	1	2	3	4	5	6	7	8	9	10	Final
Nick Deagle	1	0	2	0	2	0	3	0	1	X	9
Glen MacLeod	0	2	0	1	0	1	0	1	0	X	5

Sheet 4	1	2	3	4	5	6	7	8	9	10	Final
Bryce Everist	0	1	1	0	2	0	1	1	0	1	7
Pete Heck	0	0	0	2	0	1	0	0	2	0	5

=== Draw 2 ===
Wednesday, January 25, 4:00 pm

Sheet 1	1	2	3	4	5	6	7	8	9	10	Final
Stuart Thompson	0	3	0	0	0	1	0	2	1	0	7
Ian Fitzner-Leblanc	1	0	0	1	1	0	1	0	0	1	5

Sheet 2	1	2	3	4	5	6	7	8	9	10	Final
Travis Colter	0	0	1	0	0	1	X	X	X	X	2
Paul Flemming	1	3	0	3	2	0	X	X	X	X	9

Sheet 3	1	2	3	4	5	6	7	8	9	10	11	Final
Matthew Manuel	0	1	0	1	0	0	3	1	0	1	0	7
Peter Burgess	0	0	3	0	1	1	0	0	2	0	3	10

Sheet 4	1	2	3	4	5	6	7	8	9	10	Final
Owen Purcell	0	2	2	2	0	3	X	X	X	X	9
Nick Deagle	1	0	0	0	1	0	X	X	X	X	2

=== Draw 3 ===
Wednesday, January 25, 8:00 pm

Sheet 1	1	2	3	4	5	6	7	8	9	10	Final
Glen MacLeod	3	0	1	0	0	1	0	1	0	2	8
Pete Heck	0	1	0	1	1	0	3	0	1	0	7

Sheet 2	1	2	3	4	5	6	7	8	9	10	11	Final
Bryce Everist	0	0	2	0	2	1	1	1	2	0	0	9
Peter Burgess	3	0	0	5	0	0	0	0	0	1	1	10

Sheet 3	1	2	3	4	5	6	7	8	9	10	Final
Andrew Gibson	0	0	1	0	0	0	X	X	X	X	1
Tom Sullivan	0	3	0	3	1	2	X	X	X	X	9

=== Draw 4 ===
Thursday, January 26, 12:00 pm

Sheet 1	1	2	3	4	5	6	7	8	9	10	Final
Matthew Manuel	0	1	1	0	2	1	0	1	2	X	8
Travis Colter	1	0	0	2	0	0	2	0	0	X	5

Sheet 2	1	2	3	4	5	6	7	8	9	10	Final
Nick Deagle	1	0	1	0	3	0	0	1	0	0	6
Tom Sullivan	0	2	0	2	0	1	1	0	0	1	7

Sheet 3	1	2	3	4	5	6	7	8	9	10	Final
Ian Fitzner-Leblanc	1	0	1	0	2	0	0	2	0	0	6
Glen MacLeod	0	1	0	1	0	2	2	0	0	1	7

Sheet 4	1	2	3	4	5	6	7	8	9	10	Final
Pete Heck	0	1	0	0	4	0	1	0	0	X	6
Andrew Gibson	1	0	6	1	0	1	0	1	2	X	12

=== Draw 5 ===
Thursday, January 26, 8:00 pm

Sheet 1	1	2	3	4	5	6	7	8	9	10	Final
Owen Purcell	0	4	0	1	3	0	X	X	X	X	8
Peter Burgess	0	0	2	0	0	1	X	X	X	X	3

Sheet 2	1	2	3	4	5	6	7	8	9	10	11	Final
Matthew Manuel	3	0	4	0	1	0	0	1	0	0	1	10
Glen MacLeod	0	3	0	1	0	2	1	0	1	1	0	9

Sheet 3	1	2	3	4	5	6	7	8	9	10	11	Final
Paul Flemming	1	0	0	0	1	0	2	0	2	0	1	7
Stuart Thompson	0	1	0	1	0	1	0	1	0	2	0	6

Sheet 4	1	2	3	4	5	6	7	8	9	10	Final
Bryce Everist	0	0	0	3	0	2	3	X	X	X	8
Tom Sullivan	0	0	1	0	1	0	0	X	X	X	2

=== Draw 6 ===
Friday, January 27, 12:00 pm

Sheet 2	1	2	3	4	5	6	7	8	9	10	Final
Travis Colter	0	1	1	0	1	0	1	1	0	1	6
Ian Fitzner-Leblanc	0	0	0	1	0	1	0	0	1	0	3

Sheet 3	1	2	3	4	5	6	7	8	9	10	Final
Nick Deagle	2	0	1	0	1	0	0	1	0	X	5
Andrew Gibson	0	2	0	2	0	3	1	0	1	X	9

=== Draw 7 ===
Friday, January 27, 4:00 pm

Sheet 2	1	2	3	4	5	6	7	8	9	10	Final
Paul Flemming	0	0	0	0	0	1	0	2	0	1	4
Owen Purcell	0	0	0	0	4	0	0	0	1	0	5

=== Draw 8 ===
Friday, January 27, 8:00 pm

Sheet 1	1	2	3	4	5	6	7	8	9	10	Final
Glen MacLeod	2	0	0	4	1	1	X	X	X	X	8
Andrew Gibson	0	1	0	0	0	0	X	X	X	X	1

Sheet 2	1	2	3	4	5	6	7	8	9	10	Final
Stuart Thompson	4	1	0	2	0	1	2	X	X	X	10
Bryce Everist	0	0	1	0	2	0	0	X	X	X	3

Sheet 3	1	2	3	4	5	6	7	8	9	10	11	Final
Tom Sullivan	1	0	2	3	0	1	0	0	1	0	0	8
Travis Colter	0	2	0	0	1	0	2	2	0	1	1	9

Sheet 4	1	2	3	4	5	6	7	8	9	10	Final
Peter Burgess	1	0	0	2	0	0	0	0	X	X	3
Matthew Manuel	0	2	2	0	0	0	1	3	X	X	8

=== Draw 9 ===
Saturday, January 28, 12:00 pm

Sheet 1	1	2	3	4	5	6	7	8	9	10	Final
Paul Flemming	1	0	3	0	1	0	2	0	2	0	9
Matthew Manuel	0	2	0	2	0	2	0	3	0	1	10

Sheet 2	1	2	3	4	5	6	7	8	9	10	Final
Peter Burgess	1	0	0	2	0	1	0	2	1	X	7
Travis Colter	0	3	1	0	2	0	3	0	0	X	9

Sheet 3	1	2	3	4	5	6	7	8	9	10	Final
Bryce Everist	0	2	1	0	3	0	4	0	2	X	12
Glen MacLeod	2	0	0	1	0	1	0	2	0	X	6

Sheet 4	1	2	3	4	5	6	7	8	9	10	Final
Owen Purcell	2	1	0	0	0	0	0	0	2	1	6
Stuart Thompson	0	0	1	0	1	0	1	0	0	0	3

=== Draw 10 ===
Saturday, January 28, 8:00 pm

Sheet 1	1	2	3	4	5	6	7	8	9	10	Final
Stuart Thompson	0	1	0	0	0	4	0	0	1	X	6
Travis Colter	3	0	1	2	0	0	0	2	0	X	8

Sheet 2	1	2	3	4	5	6	7	8	9	10	Final
Paul Flemming	0	2	0	1	0	0	0	0	2	X	5
Bryce Everist	0	0	1	0	1	0	0	0	0	X	2

Sheet 3	1	2	3	4	5	6	7	8	9	10	Final
Matthew Manuel	0	0	0	1	0	2	0	2	0	1	6
Owen Purcell	0	2	0	0	0	0	0	0	1	0	3

=== Draw 11 ===
Sunday, January 29, 9:00 am

Sheet 1	1	2	3	4	5	6	7	8	9	10	Final
Matthew Manuel	2	0	3	0	0	2	0	2	1	X	10
Travis Colter	0	1	0	2	0	0	2	0	0	X	5

Sheet 2	1	2	3	4	5	6	7	8	9	10	11	Final
Owen Purcell	0	0	0	2	0	1	0	2	0	2	0	7
Paul Flemming	0	1	0	0	1	0	3	0	2	0	1	8

=== Draw 12 ===
Sunday, January 29, 2:00 pm

Sheet 3	1	2	3	4	5	6	7	8	9	10	Final
Matthew Manuel	0	0	0	0	4	0	4	0	2	X	10
Paul Flemming	0	1	1	0	0	1	0	2	0	X	5

== Playoffs ==
Semifinal			Final
			B	Matthew Manuel	5
A	Owen Purcell	8	A	Owen Purcell	4
C	Matthew Manuel	7

=== Semifinal ===
Sunday, January 29, 7:00 pm

Sheet 2	1	2	3	4	5	6	7	8	9	10	11	Final
Matthew Manuel	2	0	0	2	0	2	0	1	0	0	0	7
Owen Purcell	0	0	2	0	2	0	0	0	2	1	1	8

=== Final ===
Monday, January 30, 9:30 am

Sheet 3	1	2	3	4	5	6	7	8	9	10	Final
Matthew Manuel	0	1	0	1	0	0	1	0	1	1	5
Owen Purcell	0	0	1	0	1	0	0	2	0	0	4

2023 Nova Scotia Tankard

Matthew Manuel
1st Nova Scotia Provincial Championship title
