= Nick Zachernuk =

Canadian curler (born 1997)

- Curler
- Born: September 17, 1997 (age 29); Halifax, Nova Scotia

Team
- Curling club: Halifax CC, Halifax, NS
- Skip: Matthew Manuel
- Third: Cameron MacKenzie
- Second: Jeffrey Meagher
- Lead: Nick Zachernuk

Curling career
- Member Association: Nova Scotia
- Brier: 2 (2023, 2024)
- Top CTRS ranking: 27th (2023–24)

Nick Zachernuk (born September 17, 1997) is a Canadian curler from Halifax, Nova Scotia. He currently plays lead on Team Matthew Manuel. He is a two-time defending Nova Scotia Tankard champion and a four-time Nova Scotia junior champion.

== Career ==
=== Youth ===
In his junior career, Zachernuk won four straight Nova Scotia junior championships from 2015 to 2018 with skip Matthew Manuel. The duos first two titles came with teammates Ryan Abraham and Alec Cameron. At the 2015 Canadian Junior Curling Championships, the team lost in a tiebreaker 6–4 to Ontario's Mac Calwell, finishing tenth overall with a 4–5 record. The following year, they again finished in tenth at the 2016 Canadian Junior Curling Championships, this time with a 5–4 record. During their time together, the team also represented Nova Scotia at the 2015 Canada Winter Games. After a 4–1 round robin record, they lost in the quarterfinals 8–4 to Ontario's Matthew Hall.

Following the 2015–16 season, Abraham left the team and was replaced by Adam Cocks. The team continued to dominate provincially, securing the 2017 and 2018 Nova Scotia junior titles. At the 2017 Canadian Junior Curling Championships, they just missed the playoffs with a 5–4 record, settling for fifth. In 2018, the team had their best showing with a 6–4 record, finishing sixth and just missing the tiebreakers. In their last year of juniors, Team Manuel lost in the final of the provincial championship to Graeme Weagle.

In university curling, Zachernuk played for the Dalhousie Tigers at three straight U Sports curling championships from 2016 to 2018. As lead on the team skipped by Robert Mayhew, the team got better at each appearance but never managed to reach the playoffs. They finished with a 2–5 record in 2016, 3–4 record in 2017 and 4–3 record in 2018.

=== Men's ===
After juniors, Zachernuk took two seasons off before coming back to Team Manuel for the 2021–22 season. With third Luke Saunders and second Jeffrey Meagher, Team Manuel qualified in two of their five events. After a quarterfinal finish at the Dave Jones Mayflower Cashspiel, the team made it to the final of the Superstore Monctonian Challenge where they lost to James Grattan. Due to the COVID-19 pandemic in Nova Scotia, the 2022 provincial championship was cancelled. The Nova Scotia Curling Association then decided to appoint Team Paul Flemming to represent Nova Scotia at the 2022 Tim Hortons Brier. The following season, the Manuel rink continued to build on their success from the previous year, reaching the final of the New Scotland Brewing Men's Cash Spiel and the semifinals of the Stu Sells 1824 Halifax Classic and the Superstore Monctonian Challenge. At the 2023 Nova Scotia Tankard, the team lost their first game before rattling off seven straight victories to become both the B and C qualifiers. They then lost the first playoff game against Owen Purcell, forcing a sudden death final. Tied 4–4 in the tenth, Team Manuel stole a single point for the 5–4 victory and their first provincial men's title. This qualified the team of Manuel, Saunders, Meagher and Zachernuk for the 2023 Tim Hortons Brier where they finished with a 3–5 record, earning wins against the Northwest Territories, Nunavut and Saskatchewan.

Throughout the 2023–24 tour season, the Manuel rink only qualified in three of seven events and did not reach any finals. They had two semifinal finishes in Halifax and Moncton and a quarterfinal result at the Challenge de Curling Desjardins. Despite this, the team dominated at the 2024 Ocean Contractors Tankard, winning all five of their games. This included three victories against the Purcell rink who were ranked higher before the event began. This sent the team to the 2024 Montana's Brier in Regina, Saskatchewan. After struggling out of the gate with three consecutive losses, the team found their footing, rallying off wins against higher seeds Alberta's Aaron Sluchinski, Saskatchewan's Mike McEwen and Alberta's Kevin Koe. They then lost to Nunavut in their penultimate game, eliminating them from contention. They ended on a high note with a victory over Quebec to finish with an even 4–4 record.

== Personal life ==
Zachernuk is employed as an engineer at Lockheed Martin Canada. He is engaged.

== Teams ==
Season	Skip	Third	Second	Lead
2012–13	Matthew Manuel	Nick Zachernuk	Ryan Abraham	Alec Cameron
2013–14	Matthew Manuel	Nick Zachernuk	Ryan Abraham	Alec Cameron
2014–15	Matthew Manuel	Nick Zachernuk	Ryan Abraham	Alec Cameron
2015–16	Matthew Manuel	Nick Zachernuk	Ryan Abraham	Alec Cameron
2016–17	Matthew Manuel	Adam Cocks	Nick Zachernuk	Alec Cameron
2017–18	Matthew Manuel	Adam Cocks	Nick Zachernuk	Alec Cameron
2018–19	Matthew Manuel	Adam Cocks	Nick Zachernuk	Alec Cameron
2021–22	Matthew Manuel	Luke Saunders	Jeffrey Meagher	Nick Zachernuk
2022–23	Matthew Manuel	Luke Saunders	Jeffrey Meagher	Nick Zachernuk
2023–24	Matthew Manuel	Luke Saunders	Jeffrey Meagher	Nick Zachernuk
2024–25	Matthew Manuel	Cameron MacKenzie	Jeffrey Meagher	Nick Zachernuk
