= 2025 Canadian Mixed Doubles Curling Championship =

Curling tournament

- Host city: Summerside, Prince Edward Island
- Arena: Consolidated Credit Union Place & Silver Fox Entertainment Complex
- Dates: March 16–21
- Winner: (Manitoba) Lott / Lott
- Curling club: Gimli CC, Gimli
- Female: Kadriana Lott
- Male: Colton Lott
- Finalist: (Nova Scotia) Powers / Saunders

The 2025 Canadian Mixed Doubles Curling Championship was held from March 16 to 21 at the Consolidated Credit Union Place and the Silver Fox Entertainment Complex in Summerside, Prince Edward Island. The winning pair of Kadriana Lott and Colton Lott will represent Canada at the 2026 World Mixed Doubles Curling Championship. The event is being held in conjunction with the 2025 Canadian Under-21 World Mixed Doubles Qualifier.

The format of the championship sees thirty-two teams split into four pools, each playing a seven-game round-robin with 12 teams advancing to the single knockout playoffs. The four pool winners earn byes directly into the quarterfinals, while the teams with the following eight best records, regardless of the pool (ties of records between pools broken by Last Stone Draw), will compete in the qualification playoff games. The top four teams at this event also earned a berth into the 2026 Canadian Mixed Doubles Curling Championship.

== Qualification process ==
Many teams that had qualified through the original means of qualification later declined their invitation, giving the berth to the next highest-ranking team. Of note, number one ranked Rachel Homan and Brendan Bottcher did not compete as Homan was playing in the 2025 World Women's Curling Championship. Olympic Trials semifinalists Lisa Weagle and John Epping also declined their invitation while fourth-place finishers Brittany Tran and Rylan Kleiter did not play either.

Means of Qualification	Vacancies	Qualified
2024 CMDCC semifinalists	4	(Manitoba) Lott / Lott (Alberta) (Saskatchewan) Walker / Muyres (Alberta) Peterman / Gallant (Alberta) Papley / van Amsterdam
2025 MD Provincial/Territorial Champions	14	(Alberta) Sluchinski / Sluchinski (British Columbia) Jackson / McCrady (Manitoba) Henry / Gordon (New Brunswick) Adams / Robichaud (Newfoundland and Labrador) Wiseman / Smith (Northern Ontario) Westlund-Stewart / Stewart (Northwest Territories) King / King (Nova Scotia) Powers / Saunders (Nunavut) Pinksen / Aglukark (Ontario) Ford / Campbell (Prince Edward Island) White / White (Quebec) Riley / Mullen (Saskatchewan) Gamble / Lang (Yukon) Siciliano / Williams
2025 CMDCOT Top 4 placing teams	4	(Ontario) Jones / Laing (Ontario) Zheng / Pietrangelo (Saskatchewan) Martin / Laycock (Ontario) Sandham / Craig
2024/25 CMDR Top 10 non-qualified teams (Feb. 18, 2025)	10	(Quebec) Gionest / Desjardins (Ontario) Wasylkiw / Konings (Ontario) Neil / McDonald (Quebec) Tremblay / Lanoue (Northern Ontario) Brunton / Horgan (New Brunswick) Parmiter / Burgess (Ontario) Smith / Thomson (Quebec) Bouchard / Charest (Quebec) Gagné / Morissette (Ontario) Spruit / Spruit
TOTAL	32	

== Teams ==
The teams are listed as follows:

Female	Male	Province(s) / Territory	Club(s)
Melissa Adams	Alex Robichaud	New Brunswick	Capital WC, Fredericton
Véronique Bouchard	Jean-François Charest	Quebec	CC Chicoutimi, Chicoutimi
Kira Brunton	Jacob Horgan	Northern Ontario	Northern Credit Union CC, Sudbury
Katie Ford	Oliver Campbell	Ontario	KW Granite Club, Waterloo
Émilia Gagné	Pierre-Luc Morissette	Quebec	CC Jacques-Cartier, Sillery
Christie Gamble	Matthew Lang	Saskatchewan	Langenburg CC, Langenburg
Anne-Sophie Gionest	Robert Desjardins	Quebec	CC Riverbend, Alma & CC Chicoutimi, Chicoutimi
Robyn Henry	Rob Gordon	Manitoba	Deer Lodge CC, Winnipeg
C. J. Jackson	Matthew McCrady	British Columbia	Royal City CC, New Westminster
Jennifer Jones	Brent Laing	Ontario	Barrie CC, Barrie
Elizabeth King	Landon King	Northwest Territories	Yellowknife CC, Yellowknife
Kadriana Lott	Colton Lott	Manitoba	Gimli CC, Gimli
Nancy Martin	Steve Laycock	Saskatchewan	Nutana CC, Saskatoon
Laura Neil	Scott McDonald	Ontario	St. Thomas CC, St. Thomas
Paige Papley	Evan van Amsterdam	Alberta	Thistle CC, Edmonton
Tyler Parmiter	Ronnie Burgess	New Brunswick	Capital WC, Fredericton
Jocelyn Peterman	Brett Gallant	Alberta	The Glencoe Club, Calgary
Sadie Pinksen	David Aglukark	Nunavut	Iqaluit CC, Iqaluit
Marlee Powers	Luke Saunders	Nova Scotia	Halifax CC, Halifax
Emily Riley	Jesse Mullen	Quebec	Glenmore CC, Dollard-des-Ormeaux, CC Chicoutimi, Chicoutimi & CC Kénogami, Jonquière
Riley Sandham	Brendan Craig	Ontario	Guelph CC, Guelph
Ruth Siciliano	Tyler Williams	Yukon	Whitehorse CC, Whitehorse
Amanda Sluchinski	Aaron Sluchinski	Alberta	Airdrie CC, Airdrie
Megan Smith	Doug Thomson	Ontario	York CC, Newmarket
Casandra Spruit	Geoff Spruit	Ontario	Winchester CC, Winchester
Kelly Tremblay	Pierre Lanoue	Quebec	CC Boucherville, Boucherville & CC Nairn, Clermont
Laura Walker	Kirk Muyres	Alberta; Saskatchewan	Sherwood Park CC, Sherwood Park & Muenster CC, Muenster
Lauren Wasylkiw	Shane Konings	Ontario	Unionville CC, Unionville
Nicole Westlund-Stewart	Tyler Stewart	Northern Ontario	Fort William CC, Thunder Bay
Jenny White	Edward White	Prince Edward Island	Crapaud Community CC, Crapaud
Jessica Wiseman	Greg Smith	Newfoundland and Labrador	St. John's CC, St. John's
Jessica Zheng	Victor Pietrangelo	Ontario	Niagara Falls CC, Niagara Falls

== Round robin standings ==
Final Round Robin Standings

Key
Teams to Playoffs

Pool A	W	L	LSD
(Northern Ontario) Brunton / Horgan	7	0	327.1
(Alberta) Peterman / Gallant	5	2	171.3
(Quebec) Riley / Mullen	5	2	308.6
(Alberta) Sluchinski / Sluchinski	5	2	584.8
(Quebec) Gionest / Desjardins	3	4	618.5
(Saskatchewan) Gamble / Lang	2	5	430.2
(New Brunswick) Parmiter / Burgess	1	6	750.5
(Nunavut) Pinksen / Aglukark	0	7	1482.1

Pool B	W	L	LSD
(Saskatchewan) Martin / Laycock	5	2	564.1
(New Brunswick) Adams / Robichaud	4	3	347.8
(Ontario) Sandham / Craig	4	3	486.9
(Ontario) Smith / Thomson	4	3	610.1
(Quebec) Tremblay / Lanoue	4	3	460.0
(Newfoundland and Labrador) Wiseman / Smith	4	3	547.8
(Prince Edward Island) White / White	3	4	413.6
(Northwest Territories) King / King	0	7	1594.4

Pool C	W	L	LSD
(Alberta) (Saskatchewan) Walker / Muyres	7	0	581.5
(Ontario) Ford / Campbell	6	1	640.7
(Ontario) Zheng / Pietrangelo	4	3	430.1
(Ontario) Spruit / Spruit	3	4	347.5
(Manitoba) Henry / Gordon	3	4	523.0
(Ontario) Wasylkiw / Konings	3	4	696.2
(Ontario) Neil / McDonald	2	5	467.3
(Yukon) Siciliano / Williams	0	7	1010.8

Pool D	W	L	LSD
(Ontario) Jones / Laing	6	1	433.1
(Manitoba) Lott / Lott	6	1	344.8
(Nova Scotia) Powers / Saunders	5	2	696.7
(Alberta) Papley / van Amsterdam	4	3	421.1
(Quebec) Gagné / Morissette	3	4	398.2
(Northern Ontario) Westlund-Stewart / Stewart	2	5	401.1
(British Columbia) Jackson / McCrady	2	5	611.2
(Quebec) Bouchard / Charest	0	7	588.4

== Round robin results ==
All draws are listed in Atlantic Time (UTC−03:00).

=== Draw 1 ===
Sunday, March 16, 6:00 pm

Sheet A	1	2	3	4	5	6	7	8	Final
(Nunavut) Pinksen / Aglukark	0	0	0	0	0	0	X	X	0
(Northern Ontario) Brunton / Horgan	4	2	3	2	1	3	X	X	15

Sheet B	1	2	3	4	5	6	7	8	Final
(Saskatchewan) Gamble / Lang	0	1	1	1	0	2	0	0	5
(Alberta) Sluchinski / Sluchinski	2	0	0	0	1	0	2	1	6

Sheet C	1	2	3	4	5	6	7	8	Final
(Alberta) Peterman / Gallant	4	1	0	1	1	0	3	X	10
(New Brunswick) Parmiter / Burgess	0	0	2	0	0	1	0	X	3

Sheet D	1	2	3	4	5	6	7	8	Final
(Quebec) Gionest / Desjardins	0	4	2	0	0	0	3	0	9
(Quebec) Riley / Mullen	4	0	0	2	2	2	0	2	12

Sheet F	1	2	3	4	5	6	7	8	Final
(Northwest Territories) King / King	0	1	0	0	0	1	X	X	2
(Quebec) Tremblay / Lanoue	3	0	5	2	4	0	X	X	14

Sheet G	1	2	3	4	5	6	7	8	Final
(Prince Edward Island) White / White	0	0	3	0	1	0	1	X	5
(New Brunswick) Adams / Robichaud	3	1	0	2	0	2	0	X	8

Sheet H	1	2	3	4	5	6	7	8	Final
(Ontario) Sandham / Craig	0	1	0	3	0	2	0	X	6
(Ontario) Smith / Thomson	4	0	2	0	1	0	2	X	9

Sheet I	1	2	3	4	5	6	7	8	9	Final
(Saskatchewan) Martin / Laycock	0	0	2	1	1	0	1	0	2	7
(Newfoundland and Labrador) Wiseman / Smith	1	1	0	0	0	1	0	2	0	5

=== Draw 2 ===
Sunday, March 16, 9:00 pm

Sheet A	1	2	3	4	5	6	7	8	Final
(British Columbia) Jackson / McCrady	2	0	0	1	0	0	X	X	3
(Nova Scotia) Powers / Saunders	0	4	1	0	3	3	X	X	11

Sheet B	1	2	3	4	5	6	7	8	Final
(Northern Ontario) Westlund-Stewart / Stewart	0	1	0	2	0	0	X	X	3
(Alberta) Papley / van Amsterdam	2	0	5	0	3	3	X	X	13

Sheet C	1	2	3	4	5	6	7	8	Final
(Manitoba) Lott / Lott	2	0	2	2	0	5	X	X	11
(Quebec) Bouchard / Charest	0	1	0	0	1	0	X	X	2

Sheet D	1	2	3	4	5	6	7	8	Final
(Ontario) Jones / Laing	2	0	2	2	0	3	0	X	9
(Quebec) Gagné / Morissette	0	2	0	0	1	0	1	X	4

Sheet F	1	2	3	4	5	6	7	8	Final
(Yukon) Siciliano / Williams	1	0	0	1	0	0	0	X	2
(Ontario) Neil / McDonald	0	2	1	0	1	1	2	X	7

Sheet G	1	2	3	4	5	6	7	8	Final
(Manitoba) Henry / Gordon	1	0	1	0	1	0	1	0	4
(Ontario) Wasylkiw / Konings	0	1	0	1	0	1	0	2	5

Sheet H	1	2	3	4	5	6	7	8	Final
(Alberta) (Saskatchewan) Walker / Muyres	3	0	1	2	0	0	1	0	7
(Ontario) Ford / Campbell	0	1	0	0	1	2	0	1	5

Sheet I	1	2	3	4	5	6	7	8	Final
(Ontario) Zheng / Pietrangelo	1	0	3	2	2	0	2	0	10
(Ontario) Spruit / Spruit	0	3	0	0	0	4	0	4	11

=== Draw 3 ===
Monday, March 17, 10:00 am

Sheet A	1	2	3	4	5	6	7	8	Final
(Prince Edward Island) White / White	0	0	1	0	1	2	1	2	7
(Saskatchewan) Martin / Laycock	1	2	0	1	0	0	0	0	4

Sheet B	1	2	3	4	5	6	7	8	Final
(New Brunswick) Adams / Robichaud	2	0	0	1	1	0	0	2	6
(Newfoundland and Labrador) Wiseman / Smith	0	2	1	0	0	1	1	0	5

Sheet C	1	2	3	4	5	6	7	8	9	Final
(Ontario) Sandham / Craig	0	1	0	0	2	0	2	0	1	6
(Quebec) Tremblay / Lanoue	1	0	1	1	0	1	0	1	0	5

Sheet D	1	2	3	4	5	6	7	8	Final
(Ontario) Smith / Thomson	3	0	1	1	2	2	2	X	11
(Northwest Territories) King / King	0	2	0	0	0	0	0	X	2

Sheet F	1	2	3	4	5	6	7	8	Final
(Saskatchewan) Gamble / Lang	0	0	0	0	1	0	1	X	2
(Quebec) Gionest / Desjardins	0	1	1	1	0	3	0	X	6

Sheet G	1	2	3	4	5	6	7	8	Final
(Alberta) Sluchinski / Sluchinski	3	0	0	1	0	1	0	2	7
(Quebec) Riley / Mullen	0	1	1	0	2	0	2	0	6

Sheet H	1	2	3	4	5	6	7	8	9	Final
(Alberta) Peterman / Gallant	0	1	0	0	1	0	2	1	0	5
(Northern Ontario) Brunton / Horgan	2	0	1	1	0	1	0	0	1	6

Sheet I	1	2	3	4	5	6	7	8	Final
(New Brunswick) Parmiter / Burgess	3	2	0	0	1	1	2	X	9
(Nunavut) Pinksen / Aglukark	0	0	1	4	0	0	0	X	5

=== Draw 4 ===
Monday, March 17, 1:00 pm

Sheet A	1	2	3	4	5	6	7	8	Final
(Manitoba) Henry / Gordon	1	0	0	4	0	1	0	X	6
(Ontario) Zheng / Pietrangelo	0	3	2	0	2	0	3	X	10

Sheet B	1	2	3	4	5	6	7	8	Final
(Ontario) Wasylkiw / Konings	0	4	0	1	0	2	0	0	7
(Ontario) Spruit / Spruit	1	0	1	0	3	0	2	2	9

Sheet C	1	2	3	4	5	6	7	8	Final
(Alberta) (Saskatchewan) Walker / Muyres	1	0	1	0	3	0	2	2	9
(Ontario) Neil / McDonald	0	2	0	1	0	4	0	0	7

Sheet D	1	2	3	4	5	6	7	8	Final
(Ontario) Ford / Campbell	2	1	0	3	0	4	X	X	10
(Yukon) Siciliano / Williams	0	0	1	0	1	0	X	X	2

Sheet F	1	2	3	4	5	6	7	8	Final
(Northern Ontario) Westlund-Stewart / Stewart	0	0	0	0	0	0	X	X	0
(Ontario) Jones / Laing	1	1	2	3	1	1	X	X	9

Sheet G	1	2	3	4	5	6	7	8	9	Final
(Alberta) Papley / van Amsterdam	0	0	3	0	1	0	1	2	0	7
(Quebec) Gagné / Morissette	3	2	0	1	0	1	0	0	1	8

Sheet H	1	2	3	4	5	6	7	8	Final
(Manitoba) Lott / Lott	3	1	0	2	0	1	X	X	7
(Nova Scotia) Powers / Saunders	0	0	1	0	2	0	X	X	3

Sheet I	1	2	3	4	5	6	7	8	9	Final
(Quebec) Bouchard / Charest	0	1	2	0	2	0	2	0	0	7
(British Columbia) Jackson / McCrady	2	0	0	2	0	1	0	2	2	9

=== Draw 5 ===
Monday, March 17, 4:00 pm

Sheet A	1	2	3	4	5	6	7	8	Final
(Quebec) Riley / Mullen	2	0	3	0	2	0	0	1	8
(Alberta) Peterman / Gallant	0	1	0	1	0	3	1	0	6

Sheet B	1	2	3	4	5	6	7	8	Final
(New Brunswick) Parmiter / Burgess	1	0	0	1	0	0	0	X	2
(Quebec) Gionest / Desjardins	0	1	2	0	1	2	3	X	9

Sheet C	1	2	3	4	5	6	7	8	Final
(Nunavut) Pinksen / Aglukark	0	0	0	0	1	0	X	X	1
(Alberta) Sluchinski / Sluchinski	4	2	2	2	0	2	X	X	12

Sheet D	1	2	3	4	5	6	7	8	Final
(Northern Ontario) Brunton / Horgan	0	2	0	5	0	3	X	X	10
(Saskatchewan) Gamble / Lang	1	0	1	0	1	0	X	X	3

Sheet F	1	2	3	4	5	6	7	8	Final
(Newfoundland and Labrador) Wiseman / Smith	0	0	0	3	0	4	1	3	11
(Ontario) Sandham / Craig	2	1	2	0	1	0	0	0	6

Sheet G	1	2	3	4	5	6	7	8	9	Final
(Ontario) Smith / Thomson	1	0	2	0	2	0	4	0	1	10
(Saskatchewan) Martin / Laycock	0	3	0	1	0	1	0	4	0	9

Sheet H	1	2	3	4	5	6	7	8	Final
(Northwest Territories) King / King	0	0	1	0	0	0	X	X	1
(New Brunswick) Adams / Robichaud	5	2	0	3	4	1	X	X	15

Sheet I	1	2	3	4	5	6	7	8	Final
(Quebec) Tremblay / Lanoue	0	0	2	0	2	0	0	X	4
(Prince Edward Island) White / White	3	2	0	1	0	1	2	X	9

=== Draw 6 ===
Monday, March 17, 7:00 pm

Sheet A	1	2	3	4	5	6	7	8	Final
(Quebec) Gagné / Morissette	3	0	0	0	0	0	1	0	4
(Manitoba) Lott / Lott	0	1	1	1	1	1	0	2	7

Sheet B	1	2	3	4	5	6	7	8	Final
(Quebec) Bouchard / Charest	0	0	0	0	1	0	X	X	1
(Ontario) Jones / Laing	3	1	1	1	0	5	X	X	11

Sheet C	1	2	3	4	5	6	7	8	Final
(British Columbia) Jackson / McCrady	2	0	1	0	0	1	0	X	4
(Alberta) Papley / van Amsterdam	0	1	0	3	2	0	3	X	9

Sheet D	1	2	3	4	5	6	7	8	Final
(Nova Scotia) Powers / Saunders	4	0	2	1	0	3	0	X	10
(Northern Ontario) Westlund-Stewart / Stewart	0	4	0	0	1	0	1	X	6

Sheet F	1	2	3	4	5	6	7	8	Final
(Ontario) Spruit / Spruit	0	0	0	1	0	0	X	X	1
(Alberta) (Saskatchewan) Walker / Muyres	1	1	3	0	2	1	X	X	8

Sheet G	1	2	3	4	5	6	7	8	9	Final
(Ontario) Ford / Campbell	0	3	1	0	0	0	2	0	2	8
(Ontario) Zheng / Pietrangelo	1	0	0	1	1	1	0	2	0	6

Sheet H	1	2	3	4	5	6	7	8	Final
(Yukon) Siciliano / Williams	0	0	1	0	1	1	X	X	3
(Ontario) Wasylkiw / Konings	1	2	0	5	0	0	X	X	8

Sheet I	1	2	3	4	5	6	7	8	Final
(Ontario) Neil / McDonald	0	0	1	0	0	2	X	X	3
(Manitoba) Henry / Gordon	3	2	0	1	2	0	X	X	8

=== Draw 7 ===
Tuesday, March 18, 10:00 am

Sheet A	1	2	3	4	5	6	7	8	Final
(Ontario) Jones / Laing	1	3	0	4	1	5	X	X	14
(British Columbia) Jackson / McCrady	0	0	2	0	0	0	X	X	2

Sheet B	1	2	3	4	5	6	7	8	Final
(Quebec) Gagné / Morissette	0	1	0	0	3	0	X	X	4
(Nova Scotia) Powers / Saunders	1	0	2	3	0	4	X	X	10

Sheet C	1	2	3	4	5	6	7	8	Final
(Northern Ontario) Westlund-Stewart / Stewart	0	0	0	3	0	0	X	X	3
(Manitoba) Lott / Lott	4	2	3	0	2	1	X	X	12

Sheet D	1	2	3	4	5	6	7	8	Final
(Alberta) Papley / van Amsterdam	4	0	3	3	2	0	X	X	12
(Quebec) Bouchard / Charest	0	3	0	0	0	1	X	X	4

Sheet F	1	2	3	4	5	6	7	8	Final
(Ontario) Zheng / Pietrangelo	4	2	0	2	0	1	X	X	9
(Yukon) Siciliano / Williams	0	0	2	0	1	0	X	X	3

Sheet G	1	2	3	4	5	6	7	8	Final
(Ontario) Spruit / Spruit	1	0	0	1	1	0	3	0	6
(Ontario) Neil / McDonald	0	2	1	0	0	2	0	3	8

Sheet H	1	2	3	4	5	6	7	8	Final
(Manitoba) Henry / Gordon	0	0	1	0	1	0	X	X	2
(Alberta) (Saskatchewan) Walker / Muyres	2	4	0	1	0	1	X	X	8

Sheet I	1	2	3	4	5	6	7	8	Final
(Ontario) Wasylkiw / Konings	0	3	0	0	1	0	X	X	4
(Ontario) Ford / Campbell	4	0	2	3	0	3	X	X	12

=== Draw 8 ===
Tuesday, March 18, 1:00 pm

Sheet A	1	2	3	4	5	6	7	8	Final
(Quebec) Gionest / Desjardins	1	1	1	2	2	2	X	X	9
(Nunavut) Pinksen / Aglukark	0	0	0	0	0	0	X	X	0

Sheet B	1	2	3	4	5	6	7	8	Final
(Quebec) Riley / Mullen	0	0	0	0	0	0	X	X	0
(Northern Ontario) Brunton / Horgan	1	1	1	2	1	3	X	X	9

Sheet C	1	2	3	4	5	6	7	8	Final
(Saskatchewan) Gamble / Lang	0	1	0	0	3	0	0	X	4
(Alberta) Peterman / Gallant	3	0	1	2	0	3	2	X	11

Sheet D	1	2	3	4	5	6	7	8	Final
(Alberta) Sluchinski / Sluchinski	4	3	1	0	5	0	0	X	13
(New Brunswick) Parmiter / Burgess	0	0	0	2	0	4	1	X	7

Sheet F	1	2	3	4	5	6	7	8	Final
(Saskatchewan) Martin / Laycock	3	1	4	2	0	1	X	X	11
(Northwest Territories) King / King	0	0	0	0	2	0	X	X	2

Sheet G	1	2	3	4	5	6	7	8	Final
(Newfoundland and Labrador) Wiseman / Smith	0	2	0	0	1	0	X	X	3
(Quebec) Tremblay / Lanoue	4	0	1	2	0	3	X	X	10

Sheet H	1	2	3	4	5	6	7	8	Final
(Prince Edward Island) White / White	0	0	2	0	1	1	1	X	5
(Ontario) Sandham / Craig	3	2	0	3	0	0	0	X	8

Sheet I	1	2	3	4	5	6	7	8	Final
(New Brunswick) Adams / Robichaud	0	1	2	1	1	0	1	0	6
(Ontario) Smith / Thomson	2	0	0	0	0	2	0	1	5

=== Draw 9 ===
Tuesday, March 18, 4:00 pm

Sheet A	1	2	3	4	5	6	7	8	Final
(Ontario) Neil / McDonald	0	3	0	1	1	0	2	0	7
(Ontario) Ford / Campbell	2	0	2	0	0	4	0	1	9

Sheet B	1	2	3	4	5	6	7	8	Final
(Yukon) Siciliano / Williams	1	0	0	0	0	1	X	X	2
(Alberta) (Saskatchewan) Walker / Muyres	0	3	1	2	1	0	X	X	7

Sheet C	1	2	3	4	5	6	7	8	Final
(Ontario) Zheng / Pietrangelo	1	1	0	1	0	1	2	0	6
(Ontario) Wasylkiw / Konings	0	0	1	0	2	0	0	1	4

Sheet D	1	2	3	4	5	6	7	8	Final
(Ontario) Spruit / Spruit	0	3	0	0	0	2	0	X	5
(Manitoba) Henry / Gordon	1	0	2	1	4	0	1	X	9

Sheet F	1	2	3	4	5	6	7	8	Final
(Nova Scotia) Powers / Saunders	1	1	2	0	3	0	3	X	10
(Quebec) Bouchard / Charest	0	0	0	1	0	1	0	X	2

Sheet G	1	2	3	4	5	6	7	8	Final
(British Columbia) Jackson / McCrady	0	0	1	1	0	1	X	X	3
(Manitoba) Lott / Lott	1	5	0	0	5	0	X	X	11

Sheet H	1	2	3	4	5	6	7	8	Final
(Ontario) Jones / Laing	0	1	1	0	2	0	0	X	4
(Alberta) Papley / van Amsterdam	3	0	0	4	0	1	3	X	11

Sheet I	1	2	3	4	5	6	7	8	Final
(Quebec) Gagné / Morissette	1	2	0	2	0	3	0	X	8
(Northern Ontario) Westlund-Stewart / Stewart	0	0	1	0	1	0	2	X	4

=== Draw 10 ===
Tuesday, March 18, 7:00 pm

Sheet A	1	2	3	4	5	6	7	8	Final
(Quebec) Tremblay / Lanoue	0	1	1	0	4	4	1	X	11
(Ontario) Smith / Thomson	1	0	0	2	0	0	0	X	3

Sheet B	1	2	3	4	5	6	7	8	Final
(Northwest Territories) King / King	0	1	0	0	0	0	0	X	1
(Ontario) Sandham / Craig	2	0	2	1	1	1	1	X	8

Sheet C	1	2	3	4	5	6	7	8	Final
(Saskatchewan) Martin / Laycock	1	1	0	0	0	2	1	0	5
(New Brunswick) Adams / Robichaud	0	0	1	1	1	0	0	1	4

Sheet D	1	2	3	4	5	6	7	8	Final
(Newfoundland and Labrador) Wiseman / Smith	1	0	3	0	1	0	1	X	6
(Prince Edward Island) White / White	0	1	0	1	0	1	0	X	3

Sheet F	1	2	3	4	5	6	7	8	Final
(Northern Ontario) Brunton / Horgan	2	2	3	0	2	0	2	X	11
(New Brunswick) Parmiter / Burgess	0	0	0	3	0	1	0	X	4

Sheet G	1	2	3	4	5	6	7	8	Final
(Nunavut) Pinksen / Aglukark	0	1	0	1	0	0	X	X	2
(Alberta) Peterman / Gallant	2	0	2	0	3	3	X	X	10

Sheet H	1	2	3	4	5	6	7	8	Final
(Quebec) Gionest / Desjardins	2	0	0	2	0	1	0	X	5
(Alberta) Sluchinski / Sluchinski	0	3	2	0	4	0	1	X	10

Sheet I	1	2	3	4	5	6	7	8	Final
(Quebec) Riley / Mullen	0	2	0	2	0	1	0	4	9
(Saskatchewan) Gamble / Lang	2	0	2	0	2	0	1	0	7

=== Draw 11 ===
Wednesday, March 19, 10:00 am

Sheet A	1	2	3	4	5	6	7	8	Final
(Alberta) (Saskatchewan) Walker / Muyres	0	1	0	1	0	4	1	X	7
(Ontario) Wasylkiw / Konings	1	0	2	0	1	0	0	X	4

Sheet B	1	2	3	4	5	6	7	8	Final
(Ontario) Ford / Campbell	0	2	1	0	1	0	3	0	7
(Manitoba) Henry / Gordon	2	0	0	1	0	1	0	2	6

Sheet C	1	2	3	4	5	6	7	8	Final
(Yukon) Siciliano / Williams	0	0	2	0	3	1	0	X	6
(Ontario) Spruit / Spruit	4	2	0	2	0	0	1	X	9

Sheet D	1	2	3	4	5	6	7	8	Final
(Ontario) Neil / McDonald	2	0	0	0	3	0	1	X	6
(Ontario) Zheng / Pietrangelo	0	3	2	3	0	1	0	X	9

Sheet F	1	2	3	4	5	6	7	8	Final
(Manitoba) Lott / Lott	0	0	2	1	1	2	2	X	8
(Alberta) Papley / van Amsterdam	1	1	0	0	0	0	0	X	2

Sheet G	1	2	3	4	5	6	7	8	Final
(Quebec) Bouchard / Charest	1	0	0	1	0	0	2	0	4
(Northern Ontario) Westlund-Stewart / Stewart	0	2	1	0	1	1	0	1	6

Sheet H	1	2	3	4	5	6	7	8	Final
(British Columbia) Jackson / McCrady	0	1	1	0	2	0	2	2	8
(Quebec) Gagné / Morissette	1	0	0	1	0	2	0	0	4

Sheet I	1	2	3	4	5	6	7	8	Final
(Nova Scotia) Powers / Saunders	0	1	0	3	0	0	2	0	6
(Ontario) Jones / Laing	1	0	2	0	1	1	0	4	9

=== Draw 12 ===
Wednesday, March 19, 1:00 pm

Sheet A	1	2	3	4	5	6	7	8	Final
(Ontario) Sandham / Craig	1	1	0	0	0	2	0	1	5
(New Brunswick) Adams / Robichaud	0	0	1	1	1	0	1	0	4

Sheet B	1	2	3	4	5	6	7	8	Final
(Ontario) Smith / Thomson	1	1	1	0	1	0	3	1	8
(Prince Edward Island) White / White	0	0	0	1	0	3	0	0	4

Sheet C	1	2	3	4	5	6	7	8	Final
(Northwest Territories) King / King	0	1	0	0	0	1	0	X	2
(Newfoundland and Labrador) Wiseman / Smith	3	0	2	2	1	0	3	X	11

Sheet D	1	2	3	4	5	6	7	8	Final
(Quebec) Tremblay / Lanoue	1	0	0	0	0	1	X	X	2
(Saskatchewan) Martin / Laycock	0	2	1	2	2	0	X	X	7

Sheet F	1	2	3	4	5	6	7	8	Final
(Alberta) Peterman / Gallant	1	0	2	0	0	3	0	1	7
(Alberta) Sluchinski / Sluchinski	0	2	0	1	1	0	1	0	5

Sheet G	1	2	3	4	5	6	7	8	Final
(New Brunswick) Parmiter / Burgess	1	0	0	0	2	0	1	X	4
(Saskatchewan) Gamble / Lang	0	1	2	2	0	1	0	X	6

Sheet H	1	2	3	4	5	6	7	8	Final
(Nunavut) Pinksen / Aglukark	0	0	1	0	2	0	X	X	3
(Quebec) Riley / Mullen	6	2	0	5	0	2	X	X	15

Sheet I	1	2	3	4	5	6	7	8	Final
(Northern Ontario) Brunton / Horgan	0	1	3	2	0	2	1	X	9
(Quebec) Gionest / Desjardins	1	0	0	0	2	0	0	X	3

=== Draw 13 ===
Wednesday, March 19, 4:00 pm

Sheet A	1	2	3	4	5	6	7	8	Final
(Quebec) Bouchard / Charest	0	0	0	2	0	1	0	X	3
(Quebec) Gagné / Morissette	3	1	1	0	1	0	2	X	8

Sheet B	1	2	3	4	5	6	7	8	Final
(Manitoba) Lott / Lott	0	0	2	0	1	0	1	0	4
(Ontario) Jones / Laing	1	1	0	1	0	2	0	1	6

Sheet C	1	2	3	4	5	6	7	8	Final
(Alberta) Papley / van Amsterdam	0	0	0	0	0	0	X	X	0
(Nova Scotia) Powers / Saunders	2	2	1	1	2	1	X	X	9

Sheet D	1	2	3	4	5	6	7	8	Final
(Northern Ontario) Westlund-Stewart / Stewart	0	5	0	2	0	1	0	0	8
(British Columbia) Jackson / McCrady	1	0	3	0	1	0	1	1	7

Sheet F	1	2	3	4	5	6	7	8	Final
(Ontario) Ford / Campbell	1	0	1	0	4	1	0	1	8
(Ontario) Spruit / Spruit	0	2	0	3	0	0	2	0	7

Sheet G	1	2	3	4	5	6	7	8	Final
(Alberta) (Saskatchewan) Walker / Muyres	1	0	1	0	2	0	1	1	6
(Ontario) Zheng / Pietrangelo	0	2	0	1	0	1	0	0	4

Sheet H	1	2	3	4	5	6	7	8	Final
(Ontario) Wasylkiw / Konings	1	0	2	1	0	1	0	1	6
(Ontario) Neil / McDonald	0	1	0	0	1	0	3	0	5

Sheet I	1	2	3	4	5	6	7	8	Final
(Manitoba) Henry / Gordon	3	0	0	2	1	0	0	2	8
(Yukon) Siciliano / Williams	0	3	1	0	0	2	1	0	7

=== Draw 14 ===
Wednesday, March 19, 7:00 pm

Sheet A	1	2	3	4	5	6	7	8	Final
(New Brunswick) Parmiter / Burgess	0	1	0	3	0	2	0	X	6
(Quebec) Riley / Mullen	2	0	2	0	1	0	3	X	8

Sheet B	1	2	3	4	5	6	7	8	Final
(Alberta) Peterman / Gallant	2	1	1	1	0	2	1	X	8
(Quebec) Gionest / Desjardins	0	0	0	0	1	0	0	X	1

Sheet C	1	2	3	4	5	6	7	8	Final
(Alberta) Sluchinski / Sluchinski	1	0	1	1	0	0	0	X	3
(Northern Ontario) Brunton / Horgan	0	3	0	0	2	1	2	X	8

Sheet D	1	2	3	4	5	6	7	8	Final
(Saskatchewan) Gamble / Lang	1	1	0	1	2	0	1	1	7
(Nunavut) Pinksen / Aglukark	0	0	2	0	0	2	0	0	4

Sheet F	1	2	3	4	5	6	7	8	Final
(Ontario) Smith / Thomson	1	0	1	0	1	0	2	0	5
(Newfoundland and Labrador) Wiseman / Smith	0	1	0	1	0	2	0	3	7

Sheet G	1	2	3	4	5	6	7	8	Final
(Ontario) Sandham / Craig	1	0	3	0	0	1	0	0	5
(Saskatchewan) Martin / Laycock	0	2	0	2	2	0	2	1	9

Sheet H	1	2	3	4	5	6	7	8	Final
(New Brunswick) Adams / Robichaud	0	1	0	0	2	1	1	0	5
(Quebec) Tremblay / Lanoue	2	0	2	1	0	0	0	1	6

Sheet I	1	2	3	4	5	6	7	8	9	Final
(Prince Edward Island) White / White	4	0	0	0	0	3	0	1	1	9
(Northwest Territories) King / King	0	2	2	1	2	0	1	0	0	8

== Playoffs ==
Qualification Games
8	(Quebec) Riley / Mullen	7
9	(Alberta) Sluchinski / Sluchinski	6
5	(Manitoba) Lott / Lott	10
12	(Alberta) Papley / van Amsterdam	4
7	(Alberta) Peterman / Gallant	5
10	(Nova Scotia) Powers / Saunders	6
6	(Ontario) Ford / Campbell	4
11	(New Brunswick) Adams / Robichaud	11

Quarterfinals
1	(Northern Ontario) Brunton / Horgan	8
8	(Quebec) Riley / Mullen	2
4	(Saskatchewan) Martin / Laycock	4
5	(Manitoba) Lott / Lott	9
2	(Alberta) (Saskatchewan) Walker / Muyres	4
10	(Nova Scotia) Powers / Saunders	6
3	(Ontario) Jones / Laing	8
11	(New Brunswick) Adams / Robichaud	9

Semifinals
1	(Northern Ontario) Brunton / Horgan	5
5	(Manitoba) Lott / Lott	6
10	(Nova Scotia) Powers / Saunders	5
11	(New Brunswick) Adams / Robichaud	4

Final
5	(Manitoba) Lott / Lott	9
10	(Nova Scotia) Powers / Saunders	8

=== Qualification Games ===
Thursday, March 20, 3:00 pm

Sheet A	1	2	3	4	5	6	7	8	Final
(Quebec) Riley / Mullen	0	2	2	1	0	1	0	1	7
(Alberta) Sluchinski / Sluchinski	3	0	0	0	2	0	1	0	6

Sheet B	1	2	3	4	5	6	7	8	Final
(Ontario) Ford / Campbell	0	2	2	0	0	0	0	X	4
(New Brunswick) Adams / Robichaud	1	0	0	1	1	4	4	X	11

Sheet C	1	2	3	4	5	6	7	8	Final
(Alberta) Peterman / Gallant	0	2	0	0	1	1	0	1	5
(Nova Scotia) Powers / Saunders	3	0	1	1	0	0	1	0	6

Sheet D	1	2	3	4	5	6	7	8	Final
(Manitoba) Lott / Lott	3	0	0	2	2	0	3	X	10
(Alberta) Papley / van Amsterdam	0	1	1	0	0	2	0	X	4

=== Quarterfinals ===
Thursday, March 20, 7:00 pm

Sheet A	1	2	3	4	5	6	7	8	Final
(Saskatchewan) Martin / Laycock	0	1	0	2	0	1	0	X	4
(Manitoba) Lott / Lott	3	0	2	0	1	0	3	X	9

Sheet B	1	2	3	4	5	6	7	8	Final
(Alberta) (Saskatchewan) Walker / Muyres	1	0	1	1	0	1	0	0	4
(Nova Scotia) Powers / Saunders	0	1	0	0	2	0	2	1	6

Sheet C	1	2	3	4	5	6	7	8	Final
(Northern Ontario) Brunton / Horgan	4	2	0	1	0	1	X	X	8
(Quebec) Riley / Mullen	0	0	1	0	1	0	X	X	2

Sheet D	1	2	3	4	5	6	7	8	Final
(Ontario) Jones / Laing	1	0	2	1	0	4	0	0	8
(New Brunswick) Adams / Robichaud	0	3	0	0	2	0	2	2	9

=== Semifinals ===
Friday, March 21, 9:30 am

Sheet B	1	2	3	4	5	6	7	8	Final
(Northern Ontario) Brunton / Horgan	2	0	0	1	0	1	1	0	5
(Manitoba) Lott / Lott	0	1	1	0	1	0	0	3	6

Sheet C	1	2	3	4	5	6	7	8	Final
(Nova Scotia) Powers / Saunders	1	1	2	0	0	1	0	0	5
(New Brunswick) Adams / Robichaud	0	0	0	1	1	0	1	1	4

=== Final ===
Friday, March 21, 1:00 pm

Sheet C	1	2	3	4	5	6	7	8	9	Final
(Manitoba) Lott / Lott	3	0	2	0	1	0	2	0	1	9
(Nova Scotia) Powers / Saunders	0	2	0	2	0	2	0	2	0	8
