= List of curling clubs in Nova Scotia =

Curling Clubs in the Canadian province of Nova Scotia are organized by the Nova Scotia Curling Association. The following is a list of clubs in the province.

- 14 Wing Greenwood Curling Club - Greenwood
- Amherst Curling Club - Amherst
- Baddeck Curling Club - Baddeck
- Barrington Regional Curling Club - Barrington Passage
- Berwick Curling Club - Berwick
- Bluenose Curling Club - New Glasgow
- Bridgetown Curling Club - Bridgetown
- Bridgewater Curling Club - Bridgewater
- CFB Halifax Curling Club - Halifax
- Chedabucto Curling Club - Boylston
- Chester Curling Club - Chester
- Clare Curling Association - Meteghan
- Curl Kentville - Kentville
- Dartmouth Curling Club - Dartmouth
- Digby Curling Club - Digby
- Halifax Curling Club - Halifax
- Highlander Curling Club - St. Andrew's
- Lakeshore Curling Club - Lower Sackville
- Liverpool Curling Club - Liverpool
- Lunenburg Curling Club - Lunenburg
- Mayflower Curling Club - Timberlea
- Middleton Curling Club - Middleton
- New Caledonian Curling Club - Pictou
- Northumberland Community Curling Club - Pugwash
- Schooner Curling Club - Sydney
- Shelburne Curling Club - Shelburne
- Stellar Curling Club - Stellarton
- Strait Area Community Curling Club - Port Hawkesbury
- Sydney Curling Club - Sydney
- Truro Curling Club - Truro
- Westville Curling Club - Westville
- Windsor Curling Club - Windsor
- Wolfville Curling Club - Wolfville
- Yarmouth Curling Club - Yarmouth
