= Luke Saunders =

Canadian curler (born 1993)

- Curler
- Born: November 17, 1993 (age 33); Halifax, Nova Scotia, Canada

Team
- Curling club: Halifax CC, Halifax, NS
- Skip: Mark Kean
- Third: Luke Saunders
- Second: Nathan Gray
- Lead: Ryan Abraham
- Mixed doubles partner: Marlee Powers

Curling career
- Member Association: Nova Scotia
- Brier: 3 (2023, 2024, 2025)
- Top CTRS ranking: 14th (2024–25)
Medal record
Curling
Representing Nova Scotia
Canadian Mixed Doubles Championship
Silver medal – second place	2025 Summerside

Luke Malachi Saunders (born November 17, 1993) is a Canadian curler and tennis player from Halifax, Nova Scotia. He currently plays Third on Team Mark Kean. He is a three-time defending Nova Scotia Tankard champion and former NCAA Division I tennis player.

== Curling career ==
=== Juniors ===
Saunders qualified for one Canadian Junior Curling Championship in 2013, playing second for Stuart Thompson. At the provincial championship, the team of Thompson, Scott Babin, Saunders and Alex MacNeil went undefeated to claim the title. Representing Nova Scotia in Fort McMurray, Alberta, the team went through the round robin and championship pools with an 8–2 record, earning a spot in the playoffs. They then lost to Manitoba's Matt Dunstone 9–4 in the semifinal, earning the bronze medal.

=== Men's ===
After juniors, Saunders moved to Chattanooga, Tennessee, for university and did not curl competitively again until the 2017–18 season, joining the team of Mark Dacey, Andrew Gibson and Stephen Burgess. On tour, the team won the Dave Jones Mayflower Cashspiel, defeating Chad Stevens in the final. They also qualified for the playoffs at the Challenge de Curling de Gatineau and the Jim Sullivan Curling Classic before losing in the quarterfinals. After qualifying for the 2018 Deloitte Tankard through the last chance qualifier, Team Dacey finished 5–2 through the round robin and earned a playoff spot. They then beat Saunders' former skip Stuart Thompson in the semifinal before coming up short against Jamie Murphy in the final, finishing second. Team Dacey disbanded the following season after not qualifying for the 2019 Deloitte Tankard.

For the 2019–20 season, Saunders joined the newly formed Matthew Manuel rink at third with second Adam Cocks and lead Jeff Wilson. The team immediately found success with playoff appearances at The Curling Store Cashspiel and the Bud Light Men's Cash Spiel. They also qualified for the 2020 Deloitte Tankard. There, Team Manuel finished 4–3 through the round robin, qualifying for a tiebreaker. They then lost 9–6 to Chad Stevens to eliminate them in fifth place. Cocks and Wilson left the team after just one season and were replaced by Jeffrey Meagher and Ryan Abraham. In their three events played during the abbreviated 2020–21 season, the team had a notable second-place finish at the Stu Sells 1824 Halifax Classic where they lost to the Brad Gushue rink in the final. Abraham only stayed with the team for one season and was replaced by Nick Zachernuk.

During the 2021–22 season, Team Manuel qualified in two of their five events. After a quarterfinal finish at the Dave Jones Mayflower Cashspiel, the team made it to the final of the Superstore Monctonian Challenge where they lost to James Grattan. Due to the COVID-19 pandemic in Nova Scotia, the 2022 provincial championship was cancelled. The Nova Scotia Curling Association then decided to appoint Team Paul Flemming to represent Nova Scotia at the 2022 Tim Hortons Brier. The following season, the Manuel rink continued to build on their success from the previous year, reaching the final of the New Scotland Brewing Men's Cash Spiel and the semifinals of the Stu Sells 1824 Halifax Classic and the Superstore Monctonian Challenge. At the 2023 Nova Scotia Tankard, the team lost their first game before rattling off seven straight victories to become both the B and C qualifiers. They then lost the first playoff game against Owen Purcell, forcing a sudden death final. Tied 4–4 in the tenth, Team Manuel stole a single point for the 5–4 victory and their first provincial men's title. This qualified the team of Manuel, Saunders, Meagher and Zachernuk for the 2023 Tim Hortons Brier where they finished with a 3–5 record, earning wins against the Northwest Territories, Nunavut and Saskatchewan.

Throughout the 2023–24 tour season, the Manuel rink only qualified in three of seven events and did not reach any finals. They had two semifinal finishes in Halifax and Moncton and a quarterfinal result at the Challenge de Curling Desjardins. Despite this, the team dominated at the 2024 Ocean Contractors Tankard, winning all five of their games. This included three victories against the Purcell rink who were ranked higher before the event began. This sent the team to the 2024 Montana's Brier in Regina, Saskatchewan. After struggling out of the gate with three consecutive losses, the team found their footing, rallying off wins against higher seeds Alberta's Aaron Sluchinski, Saskatchewan's Mike McEwen and Alberta's Kevin Koe. They then lost to Nunavut in their penultimate game, eliminating them from contention. They ended on a high note with a victory over Quebec to finish with an even 4–4 record. At the end of the event, Saunders won the Ross Harstone Sportsmanship Award which is voted on by fellow peers as the curler who best represented Harstone's high ideals of good sportsmanship, observance of the rules, exemplary conduct and curling ability.

After five seasons with Team Manuel, Saunders left to team to join the Owen Purcell rink for the 2024–25 season. In their first season together, Team Purcell would win the 2025 Nova Scotia Tankard, qualifying for the 2025 Montana's Brier. At the Brier, the team would finish the round robin with a 5–3 record, qualifying for the playoffs. It was the first time Nova Scotia made the playoffs since 2006. However, Purcell would then lose to Brad Jacobs 10–6 in the Page 3/4 qualifying game. At the end of the season, the team announced that it would be parting ways with Saccary, with Gavin Lydiate replacing Saccary as second.

=== Mixed ===
In 2019, Saunders won the 2019 Nova Scotia mixed championship playing with his mother Colleen Jones, Peter Burgess and Lindsey Burgess. This qualified the foursome for the 2020 Canadian Mixed Curling Championship in Jonquière, Saguenay where they finished in tenth place with a 4–5 record. He qualified for his second mixed championship in 2023 with Jones, Paul Flemming and fiancé Marlee Powers. This squad had much more success, finishing 7–3 through the round robin and championship pools and qualifying for the playoffs. They then lost to Saskatchewan and Ontario in the semifinal and bronze medal game, respectively, finishing fourth.

=== Mixed doubles ===
Saunders began playing mixed doubles with his mother Colleen, but now plays with fiancé Marlee Powers. In 2024, Powers and Saunders won the Nova Scotia mixed doubles championship, qualifying for the 2024 Canadian Mixed Doubles Curling Championship in Fredericton. There, the pair had a strong start with wins in four of their first five games. They then lost both of their last two games on the final day of round robin, eliminating them with a 4–3 record. Powers and Saunders returned to the 2025 Canadian Mixed Doubles Curling Championship, where they would improve on their previous year's appearance, finishing second, losing to Kadriana Lott and Colton Lott 9–8 in the final.

== Personal life ==
Saunders is employed as a department manager at Waegwoltic Club. He is engaged to fellow curler Marlee Powers who he plays mixed doubles with. His mother is six-time Scotties champion and two-time World champion, Colleen Jones and his father is one-time Canadian mixed champion, Scott Saunders.

He attended the University of King's College until 2013 before moving to Tennessee to attend the University of Tennessee at Chattanooga.

== Teams ==
Season	Skip	Third	Second	Lead
2010–11	Michael Brophy	Luke Saunders	Jacob LeBlanc	Ben Creaser
2012–13	Stuart Thompson	Scott Babin	Luke Saunders	Alex MacNeil
2017–18	Mark Dacey	Andrew Gibson	Stephen Burgess	Luke Saunders
2018–19	Mark Dacey	Andrew Gibson	Luke Saunders	–
2019–20	Matthew Manuel	Luke Saunders	Adam Cocks	Jeff Wilson
2020–21	Matthew Manuel	Luke Saunders	Jeffrey Meagher	Ryan Abraham
2021–22	Matthew Manuel	Luke Saunders	Jeffrey Meagher	Nick Zachernuk
2022–23	Matthew Manuel	Luke Saunders	Jeffrey Meagher	Nick Zachernuk
2023–24	Matthew Manuel	Luke Saunders	Jeffrey Meagher	Nick Zachernuk
2024–25	Owen Purcell	Luke Saunders	Scott Saccary	Ryan Abraham
2025–26	Owen Purcell	Luke Saunders	Gavin Lydiate	Ryan Abraham
2026–27	Mark Kean	Luke Saunders	Nathan Gray	Ryan Abraham
