= Ryan Abraham =

Canadian curler (born 1999)

- Curler
- Born: July 15, 1999 (age 27); Halifax, Nova Scotia

Team
- Curling club: Halifax CC, Halifax, NS
- Skip: Mark Kean
- Third: Luke Saunders
- Second: Nathan Gray
- Lead: Ryan Abraham

Curling career
- Member Association: Nova Scotia (2005–2018; 2020–present); Prince Edward Island (2018–2020)
- Brier: 3 (2022, 2023, 2025)
- Top CTRS ranking: 13th (2023–24)

Ryan Abraham (born July 15, 1999) is a Canadian curler from Halifax, Nova Scotia. He currently plays Lead on Team Mark Kean.

== Career ==
=== Juniors ===
Abraham began his junior career as the second on the Matthew Manuel rink from Halifax. The team, with third Nick Zachernuk and lead Alec Cameron, won back-to-back Nova Scotia junior titles in 2015 and 2016. At the 2015 Canadian Junior Curling Championships, the team lost in a tiebreaker 6–4 to Ontario's Mac Calwell, finishing tenth overall with a 4–5 record. The following year, they again finished in tenth at the 2016 Canadian Junior Curling Championships, this time with a 5–4 record. During their time together, the team also represented Nova Scotia at the 2015 Canada Winter Games. After a 4–1 round robin record, they lost in the quarterfinal 8–4 to Ontario's Matthew Hall.

Abraham began skipping his own team of Mitchell Cortello, Jake Flemming and Thomas Mosher for the 2016–17 season. Despite not qualifying for the Canadian Junior championship, the team did win the Nova Scotia U18 championship and represented the province at the inaugural 2017 Canadian U18 Curling Championships. There, Abraham led his rink to a 5–3 record through the round robin and championship pools to qualify for the playoffs. The team then beat Saskatchewan's Rylan Kleiter in the semifinal before dropping the gold medal game 4–1 to Northern Ontario's Tanner Horgan, settling for silver. After failing to win the Nova Scotia junior championship again in 2018, Abraham moved to Prince Edward Island to join the Tyler Smith rink at third.

In their first season together, Team Smith went undefeated to win the PEI junior title, qualifying for the 2019 Canadian Junior Curling Championships. After a 2–4 round robin record, the team finished eleventh overall with a final record of 4–5. They won the provincial junior title again the following year to represent PEI at the 2020 Canadian Junior Curling Championships where the team fared much better. Team Smith finished second in their pool with a 5–1 record to qualify for the championship pool. There, they only won one of their four games, finishing just outside of the playoffs in fifth place with a 6–4 record. Also during his two seasons in Prince Edward Island, Abraham competed in the PEI Tankard for both the Smith and John Likely rinks, failing to qualify for the playoffs in both 2019 and 2020.

=== Men's ===
After returning to Nova Scotia, Abraham joined the Matt Manuel rink again at lead for the 2020–21 season. In their three events played during the abbreviated season, the team had a notable second-place finish at the Stu Sells 1824 Halifax Classic where they lost to the Brad Gushue rink in the final.

The following season, Abraham joined the defending provincial champion Paul Flemming rink at second, replacing Jamie Murphy. On tour, the team won their third event together, defeating Robert Desjardins 6–1 in the final of the Dave Jones Mayflower Cashspiel. Team Flemming had enough points to qualify for the 2021 Canadian Olympic Curling Pre-Trials. Despite entering the event as one of the lower seeded teams, the team went 4–2 in the round robin to qualify for the playoff round. They then lost back-to-back games in the playoffs to Tanner Horgan and Pat Simmons, eliminating them from contention. Back on tour, Team Flemming finished second at the Challenge Casino de Charlevoix, losing 6–5 in the final to Mike Fournier. Due to the COVID-19 pandemic in Nova Scotia, the 2022 provincial championship was cancelled. The Nova Scotia Curling Association decided to appoint Team Flemming to represent Nova Scotia at the 2022 Tim Hortons Brier in Lethbridge, Alberta. There, the team went 3–5 through the round robin.

Team Flemming played in three tour events during the 2022–23 season, reaching the quarterfinals at the Challenge de Curling Desjardins and the Curl Mesabi Classic. At the 2023 Nova Scotia Tankard, the team failed to qualify for the playoffs, losing both the A and C event finals. After the event, Abraham was chosen to be Team Manuel's alternate at the 2023 Tim Hortons Brier where they finished with a 3–5 record. He played in no games.

Abraham would later join Owen Purcell's rink, including Luke Saunders, and Scott Saccary, where they would win the 2025 Nova Scotia Tankard, qualifying for the 2025 Montana's Brier. At the Brier, the team would finish the round robin with a 5–3 record, qualifying for the playoffs. It was the first time Nova Scotia made the playoffs since 2006. However, Purcell would then lose to Brad Jacobs 10–6 in the Page 3/4 qualifying game. At the end of the season, the team announced that it would be parting ways with Saccary, with Gavin Lydiate replacing Saccary as second. At the 2026 Nova Scotia Tankard, Team Purcell would be unable to defend their NS championship, losing in the final 9–7 to Kendal Thompson.

== Personal life ==
Abraham is employed as an installation technician at Oakhill Outdoor Practice.

== Teams ==
Season	Skip	Third	Second	Lead
2012–13	Matthew Manuel	Nick Zachernuk	Ryan Abraham	Alec Cameron
2013–14	Matthew Manuel	Nick Zachernuk	Ryan Abraham	Alec Cameron
2014–15	Matthew Manuel	Nick Zachernuk	Ryan Abraham	Alec Cameron
2015–16	Matthew Manuel	Nick Zachernuk	Ryan Abraham	Alec Cameron
2016–17	Ryan Abraham	Mitchell Cortello	Jake Flemming	Thomas Mosher
2017–18	Ryan Abraham	Brooks Roche	Jake Flemming	Thomas Mosher
2018–19	Tyler Smith	Ryan Abraham	Alex MacFadyen	Ryan Lowery
2019–20	Tyler Smith	Ryan Abraham	Jake Flemming	Ryan Lowery
2020–21	Matthew Manuel	Luke Saunders	Jeffrey Meagher	Ryan Abraham
2021–22	Paul Flemming	Scott Saccary	Ryan Abraham	Phil Crowell
2022–23	Paul Flemming	Scott Saccary	Ryan Abraham	Phil Crowell
2023–24	Owen Purcell	Ryan Abraham	Scott Saccary	Adam McEachren
2024–25	Owen Purcell	Luke Saunders	Scott Saccary	Ryan Abraham
2025–26	Owen Purcell	Luke Saunders	Gavin Lydiate	Ryan Abraham
2026–27	Mark Kean	Luke Saunders	Nathan Gray	Ryan Abraham
