= 2020 Deloitte Tankard =

- Host city: Dartmouth, Nova Scotia
- Arena: Dartmouth Curling Club
- Dates: January 20–26
- Winner: Team Murphy
- Curling club: Halifax CC, Halifax
- Skip: Jamie Murphy
- Third: Paul Flemming
- Second: Scott Saccary
- Lead: Phil Crowell
- Alternate: Kevin Ouellette
- Coach: Bruce Lohnes
- Finalist: Kendal Thompson

The 2020 Deloitte Tankard, the provincial men's curling championship of Nova Scotia, was held from January 20 to 26 at the Dartmouth Curling Club in Dartmouth. The winning Jamie Murphy rink represented Nova Scotia at the 2020 Tim Hortons Brier in Kingston, Ontario and finished with a 3–4 record. The event was held in conjunction with the 2020 Nova Scotia Scotties Tournament of Hearts, the provincial women's curling championship.

Jamie Murphy won his sixth Nova Scotia Men's provincial title when he defeated Kendal Thompson's team 10-4 in the final.

== Qualification process ==
Qualification method	Berths	Qualifying team(s)
CTRS leaders	2	Jamie Murphy; Stuart Thompson
Qualifier	6	Chad Stevens; Brent MacDougall; Matthew Manuel; Andrew Gibson; Kendal Thompson; Alan O'Leary

== Teams ==
The teams are listed as follows:

Skip	Third	Second	Lead	Alternate	Club
Andrew Gibson	Mike Flemming	Mike Bardsley	Donald McDermaid		Lakeshore Curling Club
Brent MacDougall	Paul Dexter	Martin Gavin	Kirk MacDiarmid		Mayflower Curling Club
Matthew Manuel	Luke Saunders	Adam Cocks	Jeff Wilson	Taylor Ardiel	Halifax Curling Club
Jamie Murphy	Paul Flemming	Scott Saccary	Phil Crowell	Kevin Ouellette	Halifax Curling Club
Alan O'Leary	Stuart MacLean	Danny Christianson	Harold McCarthy		Dartmouth Curling Club
Chad Stevens	Peter Burgess	Graham Breckon	Kelly Mittelstadt		Truro Curling Club
Kendal Thompson	Bryce Everist	Chris MacRae	Michael Brophy		Halifax Curling Club
Stuart Thompson	Colten Steele	Cameron MacKenzie	Travis Colter		Dartmouth Curling Club

== Round-robin standings ==
Final round-robin standings

Key
Teams to Playoffs
Teams to Tiebreaker

Skip	W	L
Jamie Murphy	6	1
Kendal Thompson	5	2
Stuart Thompson	4	3
Chad Stevens	4	3
Matthew Manuel	4	3
Brent MacDougall	3	4
Alan O'Leary	1	6
Andrew Gibson	1	6

== Round-robin results ==
All draw times are listed in Atlantic Standard Time (UTC-04:00).

=== Draw 1 ===
Monday, January 20, 3:00 pm

Sheet B	1	2	3	4	5	6	7	8	9	10	Final
Stuart Thompson	0	3	2	0	2	0	0	0	1	X	8
Brent MacDougall	1	0	0	1	0	2	0	0	0	X	4

Sheet C	1	2	3	4	5	6	7	8	9	10	Final
Jamie Murphy	3	0	0	3	0	2	0	1	X	X	9
Alan O'Leary	0	0	2	0	1	0	1	0	X	X	4

Sheet D	1	2	3	4	5	6	7	8	9	10	Final
Chad Stevens	0	2	0	0	0	1	0	2	1	1	7
Matthew Manuel	2	0	0	2	1	0	1	0	0	0	6

Sheet E	1	2	3	4	5	6	7	8	9	10	Final
Kendal Thompson	3	0	2	0	0	0	1	0	0	0	6
Andrew Gibson	0	2	0	1	0	1	0	1	1	1	7

=== Draw 2 ===
Tuesday, January 21, 9:00 am

Sheet B	1	2	3	4	5	6	7	8	9	10	Final
Chad Stevens	0	0	1	0	3	0	2	1	2	X	9
Alan O'Leary	1	0	0	1	0	1	0	0	0	X	3

Sheet C	1	2	3	4	5	6	7	8	9	10	Final
Stuart Thompson	2	0	3	2	0	1	1	0	X	X	9
Andrew Gibson	0	3	0	0	1	0	0	1	X	X	5

Sheet D	1	2	3	4	5	6	7	8	9	10	Final
Kendal Thompson	2	1	0	0	0	0	2	0	0	2	7
Brent MacDougall	0	0	2	1	0	0	0	1	0	0	4

Sheet E	1	2	3	4	5	6	7	8	9	10	Final
Jamie Murphy	0	1	0	0	1	2	0	0	1	2	7
Matthew Manuel	0	0	0	1	0	0	1	1	0	0	3

=== Draw 3 ===
Tuesday, January 21, 7:00 pm

Sheet B	1	2	3	4	5	6	7	8	9	10	Final
Kendal Thompson	1	0	1	0	0	2	0	2	0	0	6
Matthew Manuel	0	3	0	1	1	0	2	0	1	2	10

Sheet C	1	2	3	4	5	6	7	8	9	10	Final
Chad Stevens	0	1	0	5	0	0	3	0	0	X	9
Brent MacDougall	1	0	1	0	3	1	0	1	0	X	7

Sheet D	1	2	3	4	5	6	7	8	9	10	Final
Jamie Murphy	2	0	1	1	5	X	X	X	X	X	9
Andrew Gibson	0	1	0	0	0	X	X	X	X	X	1

Sheet E	1	2	3	4	5	6	7	8	9	10	11	Final
Stuart Thompson	1	0	0	2	0	4	0	1	0	0	1	9
Alan O'Leary	0	0	2	0	2	0	1	0	2	1	0	8

=== Draw 4 ===
Wednesday, January 22, 2:00 pm

Sheet B	1	2	3	4	5	6	7	8	9	10	Final
Brent MacDougall	1	0	2	0	2	2	0	1	3	X	11
Andrew Gibson	0	1	0	2	0	0	1	0	0	X	4

Sheet C	1	2	3	4	5	6	7	8	9	10	Final
Matthew Manuel	0	0	2	0	2	2	1	0	X	X	7
Alan O'Leary	2	0	0	2	0	0	0	1	X	X	5

Sheet D	1	2	3	4	5	6	7	8	9	10	11	Final
Stuart Thompson	1	3	0	1	0	1	0	0	0	1	0	7
Kendal Thompson	0	0	2	0	1	0	1	2	1	0	1	8

Sheet E	1	2	3	4	5	6	7	8	9	10	Final
Jamie Murphy	0	2	0	0	0	3	1	0	2	X	8
Chad Stevens	1	0	0	1	1	0	0	1	0	X	4

=== Draw 5 ===
Thursday, January 23, 9:00 am

Sheet B	1	2	3	4	5	6	7	8	9	10	Final
Stuart Thompson	0	0	1	4	1	0	1	0	0	1	8
Matthew Manuel	3	2	0	0	0	2	0	1	1	0	9

Sheet C	1	2	3	4	5	6	7	8	9	10	Final
Jamie Murphy	0	2	0	2	2	0	1	0	2	0	9
Brent MacDougall	0	0	3	0	0	2	0	1	0	1	7

Sheet D	1	2	3	4	5	6	7	8	9	10	Final
Chad Stevens	4	1	0	0	2	1	X	X	X	X	8
Andrew Gibson	0	0	1	0	0	0	X	X	X	X	1

Sheet E	1	2	3	4	5	6	7	8	9	10	Final
Kendal Thompson	0	1	1	1	0	0	2	1	1	X	7
Alan O'Leary	0	0	0	0	2	1	0	0	0	X	3

=== Draw 6 ===
Thursday, January 23, 7:00 pm

Sheet B	1	2	3	4	5	6	7	8	9	10	Final
Jamie Murphy	1	0	1	0	1	0	1	0	1	0	5
Kendal Thompson	0	1	0	1	0	2	0	1	0	1	6

Sheet C	1	2	3	4	5	6	7	8	9	10	Final
Matthew Manuel	0	2	1	0	0	3	0	2	X	X	8
Andrew Gibson	1	0	0	0	1	0	1	0	X	X	3

Sheet D	1	2	3	4	5	6	7	8	9	10	Final
Brent MacDougall	1	0	2	0	2	2	X	X	X	X	7
Alan O'Leary	0	1	0	1	0	0	X	X	X	X	2

Sheet E	1	2	3	4	5	6	7	8	9	10	Final
Stuart Thompson	1	0	0	1	1	0	0	2	2	X	7
Chad Stevens	0	0	1	0	0	1	1	0	0	X	3

=== Draw 7 ===
Friday, January 24, 2:00 pm

Sheet B	1	2	3	4	5	6	7	8	9	10	Final
Andrew Gibson	1	0	0	0	0	0	0	2	0	X	3
Alan O'Leary	0	0	0	0	2	1	1	0	3	X	7

Sheet C	1	2	3	4	5	6	7	8	9	10	Final
Chad Stevens	1	1	0	0	1	0	1	0	0	0	4
Kendal Thompson	0	0	3	0	0	1	0	2	0	2	8

Sheet D	1	2	3	4	5	6	7	8	9	10	Final
Jamie Murphy	0	2	0	2	4	0	1	2	X	X	11
Stuart Thompson	1	0	1	0	0	2	0	0	X	X	4

Sheet E	1	2	3	4	5	6	7	8	9	10	Final
Brent MacDougall	3	1	0	0	0	1	2	2	X	X	9
Matthew Manuel	0	0	0	1	1	0	0	0	X	X	2

== Tiebreakers ==
Saturday, January 25, 9:00 am

Sheet D	1	2	3	4	5	6	7	8	9	10	Final
Chad Stevens	2	0	0	2	0	2	0	0	0	3	9
Matthew Manuel	0	0	1	0	2	0	0	2	1	0	6

Saturday, January 25, 2:00 pm

Sheet C	1	2	3	4	5	6	7	8	9	10	Final
Stuart Thompson	0	0	0	3	0	1	0	1	1	X	6
Chad Stevens	0	2	2	0	2	0	2	0	0	X	8

== Playoffs ==
Semifinal			Final
			1	Jamie Murphy	10
2	Kendal Thompson	7	2	Kendal Thompson	4
3	Chad Stevens	2

=== Semifinal ===
Saturday, January 25, 7:00 pm

Sheet D	1	2	3	4	5	6	7	8	9	10	Final
Kendal Thompson	1	1	2	0	1	0	1	1	X	X	7
Chad Stevens	0	0	0	1	0	1	0	0	X	X	2

=== Final ===
Sunday, January 26, 9:00 am

Sheet C	1	2	3	4	5	6	7	8	9	10	Final
Jamie Murphy	0	1	0	2	1	0	2	0	4	X	10
Kendal Thompson	0	0	1	0	0	2	0	1	0	X	4

2020 Nova Scotia Tankard

Jamie Murphy
6th Nova Scotia Provincial Championship title
