= Owen Purcell =

Canadian curler (born 2000)

- Curler
- Born: July 8, 2000 (age 26); Tantallon, Nova Scotia

Team
- Curling club: Halifax CC, Halifax, NS
- Skip: Sam Mooibroek
- Third: Owen Purcell
- Second: Scott Mitchell
- Lead: Gavin Lydiate

Curling career
- Member Association: Nova Scotia (2017–2026); Ontario (2026–present)
- Brier: 1 (2025)
- Top CTRS ranking: 13th (2023–24)
Medal record
Men's curling
Representing Canada
World Junior Championships
Bronze medal – third place	2022 Jönköping
World University Games
Bronze medal – third place	2023 Lake Placid

Owen Purcell (born July 8, 2000) is a Canadian curler from Upper Tantallon, Nova Scotia. He currently plays third on Team Sam Mooibroek. He is most notable for winning multiple Canadian junior titles and representing Canada at the 2022 World Junior Curling Championships.

== Career ==
In 2017, Purcell's rink out of CFB Halifax would start 2–1 at the 2017 Nova Scotia Junior Under 18 Men's Championship qualifying for the championship round in the B Event. Purcell lost in the championship round to Team Ryan Abraham 6–3 who would later go on to win the event. In 2018 Purcell would win the 2018 Nova Scotia Under 18 Men's Championship playing third for Graeme Weagle. They went on to win the 2018 Canadian U18 Curling Championships defeating Alberta's Ryan Jacques 10–6 in the final. In 2019, Purcell would win the 2019 Nova Scotia Under 18 Men's Championship playing third for Adam McEachren. They went 4–2 in round robin play at the 2019 Canadian U18 Curling Championships qualifying for the knockout round. They finished the tournament in 4th. Purcell also won the 2019 Nova Scotia Junior Championship playing fourth with Graeme Weagle. They would finish 8th at nationals. The Weagle rink would once again win the Nova Scotian Provincial Playdown representing Nova Scotia at the 2020 Canadian Junior Curling Championships. The team would finish 7th with a record of 5-5. In 2021, Purcell would skip his own team and be selected to represent Nova Scotia at the 2021 World Junior Qualification Event. The team went undefeated and would represent Canada at the 2022 World Junior Curling Championships. They would go on to win the bronze medal.

In 2020, Purcell and the Dalhousie Tigers skipped by Matthew Manuel would win the 2020 AUS Curling Championship and represent Dalhousie University at the 2020 U Sports/Curling Canada University Curling Championships. They would lose in the final to Wilfrid Laurier Golden Hawks in the final, 8–5. In 2022, Purcell would skip the Dalhousie Tigers to win the 2022 Atlantic University Sport Curling Championships. They would then go on to win the 2022 FISU World University Games Qualifier, defeating Wilfrid Laurier Golden Hawks in the final 8–5. The Dalhousie Tigers won bronze for Canada at the 2023 Winter World University Games.

Purcell would find success in Men's play during the 2024–25 season, where he skipped his team of Luke Saunders, Scott Saccary, and Ryan Abraham to win the 2025 Nova Scotia Tankard, qualifying for the 2025 Montana's Brier. At the Brier, the team would finish the round robin with a 5–3 record, qualifying for the playoffs. It was the first time Nova Scotia made the playoffs since 2006. However, Purcell would then lose to Brad Jacobs 10–6 in the Page 3/4 qualifying game. At the end of the season, the team announced that it would be parting ways with Saccary, with Gavin Lydiate replacing Saccary as second.

== Personal life ==
Purcell took computer science at Dalhousie University. He currently works as an ACP Pro and curling instructor.

== Grand Slam record ==
Key
C	Champion
F	Lost in Final
SF	Lost in Semifinal
QF	Lost in Quarterfinals
R16	Lost in the round of 16
Q	Did not advance to playoffs
T2	Played in Tier 2 event
DNP	Did not participate in event
N/A	Not a Grand Slam event that season

Event	2023–24	2024–25
Tour Challenge	DNP	T2
The National	Q	DNP
