= Nova Scotia Curling Association =

- Sport: Curling
- Jurisdiction: Provincial
- Membership: 33 curling clubs
- Affiliation: Curling Canada
- Headquarters: Halifax

Official website
- www.nscurl.com
- (Canada)

The Nova Scotia Curling Association (NSCA) is the regional governing body for the sport of curling in Nova Scotia. The organization is one of 14 regional associations within Curling Canada and as such determines who will represent the province in national championships.

== Provincial championships ==
Each year the NSCA hosts 16 provincial championships:

- Ocean Contractors Tankard (men's)
- Nova Scotia Scotties Tournament of Hearts (women's)
- U21 Women's
- U21 Men's
- Mixed
- Senior Women's
- Senior Men's
- U18 Women's
- U18 Men's
- Wheelchair
- Mixed Doubles
- Junior Mixed Doubles
- Junior Mixed
- Club Championship
- Masters
- Under-15

== See also ==
- List of curling clubs in Nova Scotia
