= Halifax Curling Club =

Curling club in Halifax, Nova Scotia

- Location: 948 South Bland Street, Halifax

Information
- Established: 1824
- Club type: Dedicated
- Curling Canada region: Nova Scotia Curling Association
- Sheets of ice: 4
- Rock colours: Red and Yellow
- Website: halifaxcurl.com

Halifax Curling Club established in 1824 is one of the oldest active curling clubs in Canada. It houses four sheets of dedicated ice and is located at 948 South Bland Street in Halifax's south end. In 1874, they were the first club to build an indoor facility in Nova Scotia. The facility was located on Tower Road but was later sold in 1892. A new facility was built on South Bland Street in 1899. This new facility was home to the first official game between Scotland and Canada; Scotland would take the victory 84–78. The club was rebuilt in 1974 due to fire damage. In 1928, Halifax Curling Club was the first facility in Nova Scotia to have artificial ice.

In February 2015, the club suffered a roof collapse following an ice storm. The club reopened January 30 the following year.

== National Champions ==
- 1927 Macdonald Brier: Murray MacNeill, J.A. MacInnes, Cliff Torey, Jim Donahue
- 1951 Macdonald Brier: Don Oyler, George Hanson, Fred Dyke, Wally Knock
- 1980 Canadian Junior Women's Championship: Kay Smith, Krista Gatchell, Cathy Caudle, Peggy Wilson
- 1982 Scott Tournament of Hearts: Colleen Jones, Kay Smith, Monica Jones, Barb Jones-Gordon
- 1993 Canadian Mixed Curling Championship: Scott Saunders, Colleen Jones, Tom Fetterly, Helen Radford
- 2003 Canadian Mixed Curling Championship: Paul Flemming, Kim Kelly, Tom Fetterly, Cathy Donald
- 2022 Canadian Junior Curling Championships: Taylour Stevens, Lauren Ferguson, Alison Umlah, Cate Fitzgerald
- 2023 Canadian Senior Curling Championships: Paul Flemming, Peter Burgess, Martin Gavin, Kris Granchelli
- 2024 Canadian Junior Curling Championships: Allyson MacNutt, Maria Fitzgerald, Alison Umlah, Grace McCusker
- 2026 Canadian Mixed Curling Championship: Brent MacDougall, Erin Carmody, Scott Weagle, Marie Christianson
