= 2013 Molson Coors Tankard =

2013 Nova Scotia Men's Provincial Championship
- Host city: Truro, Nova Scotia
- Arena: Truro Curling Club
- Dates: February 6–10
- Winner: Paul Flemming
- Curling club: Lakeshore CC, Lower Sackville
- Skip: Paul Flemming
- Fourth: Ian Fitzner-Leblanc
- Second: Graham Brekcon
- Lead: Kelly Mittelstadt
- Finalist: Jamie Murphy

The 2013 Molson Coors Tankard, the Nova Scotia men's provincial curling championship, was held from February 6 to 10 at the Truro Curling Club in Truro, Nova Scotia. The winning team of Paul Flemming represented Nova Scotia at the 2013 Tim Hortons Brier in Edmonton, Alberta.

== Teams ==
Skip	Third	Second	Lead	Alternate	Locale
Ian Fitzner-LeBlanc (fourth)	Paul Flemming (skip)	Graham Breckon	Kelly Mittelstadt		Lakeshore Curling Club, Lower Sackville
Ian Juurlink	Stuart MacLean	Chris MacRae	Kerry MacLean		Mayflower Curling Club, Halifax
Jamie Murphy	Jordan Pinder	Mike Bardsley	Donald McDermaid		Lakeshore Curling Club, Lower Sackville
Shea Steele	Dana Seward	Tyler Gamble	Tom Bragnalo		Mayflower Curling Club, Halifax
Chad Stevens	Doug MacKenzie	Scott Saccary	Phil Crowell		Mayflower Curling Club, Halifax
Mark Dacey	Tom Sullivan	Steve Burgess	Andrew Gibson		Mayflower Curling Club, Halifax
Peter Burgess	Craig Burgess	Jared Bent	Todd Burgess		Truro Curling Club, Truro
Alan O'Leary	Andrew Dauphinee	Danny Christianson	Harold McCarthy	Dillon O'Leary	CFB Halifax Curling Club, Halifax

== Round-robin standings ==
Key
Teams to Playoffs
Teams to Tiebreaker

Skip (Club)	W	L	PF	PA
Jamie Murphy (Lakeshore)	6	1	44	26
Paul Flemming (Lakeshore)	4	3	39	30
Peter Burgess (Truro)	4	3	40	38
Mark Dacey (Mayflower)	4	3	47	38
Alan O'Leary (CFB Halifax)	4	3	41	38
Chad Stevens (Mayflower)	2	5	28	48
Ian Juurlink (Mayflower)	2	5	38	45
Shea Steele (Mayflower)	2	5	30	44

== Round-robin results ==
=== Draw 1 ===
Wednesday, February 6, 1:00 pm

Sheet 1	1	2	3	4	5	6	7	8	9	10	Final
Chad Stevens	0	0	0	1	1	1	1	0	1	X	5
Ian Juurlink	0	0	2	0	0	0	0	1	0	X	3

Sheet 2	1	2	3	4	5	6	7	8	9	10	Final
Paul Flemming	0	0	0	1	0	0	2	X	X	X	3
Shea Steele	0	1	4	0	0	1	0	X	X	X	6

Sheet 3	1	2	3	4	5	6	7	8	9	10	Final
Alan O'Leary	0	2	0	0	1	1	0	0	2	2	8
Mark Dacey	3	0	0	2	0	0	2	0	0	0	7

Sheet 4	1	2	3	4	5	6	7	8	9	10	Final
Jamie Murphy	0	0	1	0	0	3	0	2	X	X	6
Peter Burgess	1	0	0	1	0	0	1	0	X	X	3

=== Draw 2 ===
Wednesday, February 6, 6:00 pm

Sheet 1	1	2	3	4	5	6	7	8	9	10	Final
Alan O'Leary	0	0	0	2	2	3	0	1	X	X	8
Shea Steele	1	0	0	0	0	0	2	0	X	X	3

Sheet 2	1	2	3	4	5	6	7	8	9	10	Final
Jamie Murphy	1	0	1	0	1	0	0	1	1	1	6
Chad Stevens	0	1	0	1	0	1	0	0	0	0	3

Sheet 3	1	2	3	4	5	6	7	8	9	10	11	Final
Peter Burgess	4	0	0	1	0	0	1	0	3	0	0	9
Ian Juurlink	0	1	1	0	2	3	0	1	0	1	1	10

Sheet 4	1	2	3	4	5	6	7	8	9	10	Final
Mark Dacey	4	0	2	0	0	4	X	X	X	X	10
Paul Flemming	0	2	0	1	1	0	X	X	X	X	4

=== Draw 3 ===
Thursday, February 7, 9:00 am

Sheet 1	1	2	3	4	5	6	7	8	9	10	Final
Ian Juurlink	2	0	1	0	3	1	0	1	X	X	8
Jamie Murphy	0	0	0	2	0	0	1	0	X	X	3

Sheet 2	1	2	3	4	5	6	7	8	9	10	Final
Shea Steele	0	0	0	0	1	0	1	0	2	0	4
Mark Dacey	0	2	1	0	0	2	0	1	0	1	7

Sheet 3	1	2	3	4	5	6	7	8	9	10	Final
Paul Flemming	0	2	0	1	0	0	2	0	1	X	6
Alan O'Leary	0	0	0	0	0	1	0	0	0	X	1

Sheet 4	1	2	3	4	5	6	7	8	9	10	Final
Peter Burgess	0	2	1	0	2	0	1	0	2	X	8
Chad Stevens	1	0	0	0	0	1	0	1	0	X	3

=== Draw 4 ===
Thursday, February 7, 2:00 pm

Sheet 1	1	2	3	4	5	6	7	8	9	10	Final
Peter Burgess	0	0	1	0	1	0	0	0	X	X	2
Paul Flemming	1	1	0	2	0	0	1	2	X	X	7

Sheet 2	1	2	3	4	5	6	7	8	9	10	Final
Chad Stevens	0	1	0	1	0	0	0	X	X	X	2
Alan O'Leary	0	0	0	0	2	4	2	X	X	X	8

Sheet 3	1	2	3	4	5	6	7	8	9	10	Final
Shea Steele	0	0	0	2	0	0	0	X	X	X	2
Jamie Murphy	0	0	4	0	1	1	4	X	X	X	10

Sheet 4	1	2	3	4	5	6	7	8	9	10	Final
Ian Juurlink	1	1	0	0	1	0	1	0	0	1	5
Mark Dacey	0	0	1	1	0	1	0	1	2	0	6

=== Draw 5 ===
Thursday, February 7, 7:00 pm

Sheet 1	1	2	3	4	5	6	7	8	9	10	Final
Jamie Murphy	2	0	0	2	0	2	0	0	1	X	7
Alan O'Leary	0	1	0	0	2	0	0	1	0	X	4

Sheet 2	1	2	3	4	5	6	7	8	9	10	Final
Ian Juurlink	0	0	1	0	0	0	X	X	X	X	1
Paul Flemming	0	1	0	2	1	4	X	X	X	X	8

Sheet 3	1	2	3	4	5	6	7	8	9	10	Final
Mark Dacey	0	0	1	0	0	1	0	0	2	0	4
Peter Burgess	1	0	0	0	2	0	1	1	0	1	6

Sheet 4	1	2	3	4	5	6	7	8	9	10	Final
Chad Stevens	1	0	0	0	2	0	0	1	0	2	6
Shea Steele	0	3	1	0	0	0	0	0	1	0	5

=== Draw 6 ===
Friday, February 8, 2:00 pm

Sheet 1	1	2	3	4	5	6	7	8	9	10	Final
Mark Dacey	1	0	0	2	1	0	5	0	X	X	9
Chad Stevens	0	1	2	0	0	2	0	1	X	X	6

Sheet 2	1	2	3	4	5	6	7	8	9	10	Final
Alan O'Leary	2	0	1	0	0	0	1	0	1	0	5
Peter Burgess	0	2	0	0	2	1	0	1	0	1	7

Sheet 3	1	2	3	4	5	6	7	8	9	10	Final
Ian Juurlink	1	0	1	2	1	0	0	0	0	X	5
Shea Steele	0	2	0	0	0	1	1	1	2	X	7

Sheet 4	1	2	3	4	5	6	7	8	9	10	Final
Paul Flemming	0	0	1	0	0	0	0	1	0	X	2
Jamie Murphy	0	0	0	2	0	1	1	0	3	X	7

=== Draw 7 ===
Friday, February 8, 7:00 pm

Sheet 1	1	2	3	4	5	6	7	8	9	10	Final
Shea Steele	0	0	0	0	1	0	2	0	0	0	3
Peter Burgess	0	1	0	0	0	0	0	2	0	2	5

Sheet 2	1	2	3	4	5	6	7	8	9	10	Final
Mark Dacey	0	0	2	0	0	2	0	0	0	0	4
Jamie Murphy	1	0	0	0	1	0	1	0	1	1	5

Sheet 3	1	2	3	4	5	6	7	8	9	10	Final
Chad Stevens	0	2	0	1	0	0	0	0	0	X	3
Paul Flemming	1	0	2	0	3	1	0	0	2	X	9

Sheet 4	1	2	3	4	5	6	7	8	9	10	Final
Alan O'Leary	2	0	1	0	2	0	0	0	0	2	7
Ian Juurlink	0	1	0	1	0	2	0	2	0	0	6

== Tiebreaker ==
Saturday, February 9, 9:00 am

Sheet 3	1	2	3	4	5	6	7	8	9	10	Final
Alan O'Leary	0	0	1	0	0	1	0	X	X	X	2
Mark Dacey	2	1	0	2	2	0	1	X	X	X	8

== Playoffs ==
Page playoff system
1	Jamie Murphy	6
2	Paul Flemming	8
3	Peter Burgess	5
4	Mark Dacey	8

Semifinal
1	Jamie Murphy	10
4	Mark Dacey	6

Final
2	Paul Flemming	8
1	Jamie Murphy	7

=== 1 vs. 2 ===
Saturday, February 9, 2:00 pm

Sheet 3	1	2	3	4	5	6	7	8	9	10	Final
Jamie Murphy	1	0	0	3	0	0	0	1	1	0	6
Paul Flemming	0	2	2	0	1	2	0	0	0	1	8

=== 3 vs. 4 ===
Saturday, February 9, 2:00 pm

Sheet 2	1	2	3	4	5	6	7	8	9	10	Final
Peter Burgess	0	0	2	0	1	0	2	0	0	X	5
Mark Dacey	1	0	0	2	0	1	0	2	2	X	8

=== Semifinal ===
Saturday, February 9, 7:00 pm

Sheet 3	1	2	3	4	5	6	7	8	9	10	Final
Jamie Murphy	0	0	4	0	0	4	0	0	2	X	10
Mark Dacey	0	1	0	2	1	0	1	1	0	X	6

=== Final ===
Sunday, February 10, 2:00 pm

Sheet 3	1	2	3	4	5	6	7	8	9	10	Final
Paul Flemming	3	0	0	3	0	0	1	0	0	1	8
Jamie Murphy	0	1	0	0	2	2	0	2	0	0	7

2013 Molson Coors Tankard

Paul Flemming
6th Nova Scotia Provincial Championship title

== Qualification rounds ==
=== Round 1 ===
The first qualification round for the 2013 Nova Scotties Men's Provincial Championship took place from January 10 to 13 at the Amherst Curling Club in Amherst. The event was held in an open-entry triple knockout format qualifying five teams to the provincial playoffs.

==== Teams ====
Skip	Third	Second	Lead	Alternate	Locale
Peter Burgess	Craig Burgess	Jared Bent	Todd Burgess		Truro Curling Club, Truro
James Christianson	Robby McLean	Kirk MacDiarmid	Todd Moors		CFB Halifax Curling Club, Halifax
Mark Dacey	Tom Sullivan	Steve Burgess	Andrew Gibson		Mayflower Curling Club, Halifax
Ian Fitzner-LeBlanc	Paul Flemming	Graham Breckon	Kelly Mittelstadt		Lakeshore Curling Club, Lower Sackville
Marty Gavin	Burnard Arnie	Granchelli Kris	Callaghan Mike		CFB Halifax Curling Club, Halifax
Rob Harris	Cameron MacKenzie	Kendal Thompson	Andrew Komlodi		Mayflower Curling Club, Halifax
Ian Juurlink	Stuart MacLean	Chris MacRae	Kerry MacLean		Mayflower Curling Club, Halifax
Mark Kehoe	Glen McLeod	Richard Barker	Jeremiah Anderson		CFB Halifax Curling Club, Halifax
John Luckhurst	Paul Dexter	Bryce Everist	Pete Ross		Mayflower Curling Club, Halifax
Brent MacDougall	Lee Bout	Sean Audas	Josh MacInnis		Mayflower Curling Club, Halifax
Jamie Murphy	Jordan Pinder	Mike Bardsley	Donald McDermaid		Lakeshore Curling Club, Lower Sackville
Steve Ogden	Paul Arbuckle	Peter Neily	James Barr		Mayflower Curling Club, Halifax
Anthony Purcell	Luke Evans	Neil Gallant	Tuan Bui		Mayflower Curling Club, Halifax
Mark Robar	David Backman	Chris Baltzer	Ryan Sperry		Mayflower Curling Club, Halifax
Kevin Saccary	Kevin Lonergan	Travis Colter	Donnie Smith		Dartmouth Curling Club, Dartmouth
Scott Saunders	Bruce Lohnes	Curt Palmer	Alan Darragh	Glenn Josephson	
Kent Smith	Kyle Schmeisser	Craig Messervey	Malcolm Darnley		Mayflower Curling Club, Halifax
Shea Steele	Dana Seward	Tyler Gamble	Tom Bragnalo		Mayflower Curling Club, Halifax
Chad Stevens	Doug MacKenzie	Scott Saccary	Phil Crowell		Mayflower Curling Club, Halifax
Chris Sutherland	Mike Flemming	Kevin Ouellette	Brad Montgomery		Mayflower Curling Club, Halifax
Kris Tynski	Kurt Roach	Travis Sutherland	Mark MacNamara		Sydney Curling Club, Sydney

==== Results ====
===== A Event =====
First Knockout
Chris Sutherland	6
James Christianson	4
John Luckhurst	10
Marty Gavin	8

Quarterfinals
Brent MacDougall	5
Anthony Purcell	3
Ian Fitzner-LeBlanc	8
Chris Sutherland	7
Scott Saunders	8
Kevin Saccary	1
Jamie Murphy	7
John Luckhurst	8

Semifinals
Brent MacDougall	2
Ian Fitzner-LeBlanc	5
Scott Saunders	11
John Luckhurst	6

To Qualifier 1
Ian Fitzner-LeBlanc	7
Scott Saunders	1
Qualifier 1
Ian Fitzner-LeBlanc	6
Chad Stevens	5

First Knockout
Kris Tynski	3
Shea Steele	7
Ian Juurlink	4
Steve Ogden	10
Mark Kehoe	10
Mark Robar	1

Quarterfinals
Chad Stevens	8
Kent Smith	5
Rob Harris	4
Peter Burgess	8
Mark Dacey	7
Shea Steele	3
Steve Ogden	6
Mark Kehoe	10

Semifinals
Chad Stevens	10
Peter Burgess	4
Mark Dacey	1
Mark Kehoe	7

To Qualifier 1
Chad Stevens	9
Mark Kehoe	1

===== B Event =====
Second Knockout
Kris Tynski	6
Ian Juurlink	7

Quarterfinals
Peter Burgess	9
Ian Juurlink	1

Semifinals
Brent MacDougall	3
Mark Dacey	6
John Luckhurst	8
Peter Burgess	2

To Qualifier 2
Mark Dacey	4
John Luckhurst	5
Qualifier 2
Chad Stevens	8
John Luckhurst	2

Second Knockout
James Christianson	5
Kent Smith	9

Quarterfinals
Kevin Saccary	2
Shea Steele	7
Steve Ogden	5
Kent Smith	8

Semifinals
Shea Steele	6
Kent Smith	5

To Qualifier 3
Scott Saunders	4
Shea Steele	6
Qualifier 3
Shea Steele	6
Jamie Murphy	5

Second Knockout
Marty Gavin	5
Anthony Purcell	10
Mark Robar	9
Rob Harris	4

Quarterfinals
Chris Sutherland	4
Jamie Murphy	9
Anthony Purcell	6
Mark Robar	3

Semifinals
Jamie Murphy	9
Anthony Purcell	7

To Qualifier 3
Mark Kehoe	5
Jamie Murphy	6

===== C Event =====
Third Knockout
Mark Robar	2
Ian Juurlink	10
Brent MacDougall	8
Peter Burgess	3

Quarterfinals
Scott Saunders	5
Ian Juurlink	10
Mark Kehoe	8
Brent MacDougall	1

Semifinals
Ian Juurlink	7
Mark Kehoe	1

Qualifier 4
John Luckhurst	5
Ian Juurlink	6

Third Knockout
Marty Gavin	6
Kevin Saccary	9
James Christianson	5
Kris Tynski	7
Rob Harris	8
Chris Sutherland	9

Quarterfinals
Steve Ogden	6
Kevin Saccary	7
Anthony Purcell	8
Kris Tynski	9
Kent Smith	5
Chris Sutherland	9

Semifinals
Mark Dacey	8
Kevin Saccary	3
Kris Tynski	8
Chris Sutherland	7

To Qualifier 5
Mark Dacey	7
Kris Tynski	1
Qualifier 5
Jamie Murphy	9
Mark Dacey	4

=== Round 2 ===
The second qualification round for the 2013 Nova Scotties Men's Provincial Championship will take place from January 17 to 20 at the Wolfville Curling Club in Wolfville. The event will be held in an open-entry triple knockout format qualifying three teams to the provincial playoffs.

==== Teams ====
Skip	Third	Second	Lead	Alternate	Locale
Trevor Archibald	David Lonergan	Joel Smith	Mike McGowan	Mike Larsen	Glooscap Curling Club, Kentville
Peter Burgess	Craig Burgess	Jared Bent	Todd Burgess		Truro Curling Club, Truro
Mark Dacey	Tom Sullivan	Steve Burgess	Andrew Gibson		Mayflower Curling Club, Halifax
Marty Gavin	Burnard Arnie	Kris Granchelli	Callaghan Mike		CFB Halifax Curling Club, Halifax
Rob Harris	Cameron MacKenzie	Kendal Thompson	Andrew Komlodi		Mayflower Curling Club, Halifax
Mark Kehoe	Glen McLeod	Richard Barker	Jeremiah Anderson		CFB Halifax Curling Club, Halifax
John Luckhurst	Paul Dexter	Bryce Everist	Pete Ross		Mayflower Curling Club, Halifax
Brent MacDougall	Lee Bout	Sean Audas	Josh MacInnis		Mayflower Curling Club, Halifax
Robert Mayhew	Mike Brophy	Alex Trites	Ben Creaser		Wolfville Curling Club, Wolfville
Alan O'Leary	Andrew Dauphinee	Danny Christianson	Harold McCarthy	Dillon O'Leary	CFB Halifax Curling Club, Halifax
Steve Ogden	Paul Arbuckle	Peter Neily	James Barr		Mayflower Curling Club, Halifax
Anthony Purcell	Luke Evans	Neil Gallant	Tuan Bui		Mayflower Curling Club, Halifax
Mark Robar	David Backman	Chris Baltzer	Ryan Sperry		Mayflower Curling Club, Halifax
Kevin Saccary	Kevin Lonergan	Travis Colter	Donnie Smith		Dartmouth Curling Club, Dartmouth
Scott Saunders	Bruce Lohnes	Curt Palmer	Alan Darragh	Glenn Josephson	
Kent Smith	Kyle Schmeisser	Craig Messervey	Malcolm Darnley		Mayflower Curling Club, Halifax
Chris Sutherland	Mike Flemming	Kevin Ouellette	Brad Montgomery		Mayflower Curling Club, Halifax

==== Results ====
===== A Event =====
First Knockout		Semifinals		To Qualifier 1
Peter Burgess	7
Chris Sutherland	1	Peter Burgess	9
Brent MacDougall	8	Brent MacDougall	4
Mark Robar	5			Peter Burgess	5
Kevin Saccary	5			Rob Harris	3
John Luckhurst	2	Kevin Saccary	4
Rob Harris	7	Rob Harris	6
Trevor Archibald	6

First Knockout
Steve Ogden	3
Robert Mayhew	7

Quarterfinals
Mark Kehoe	6
Marty Gavin	2
Scott Saunders	6
Alan O'Leary	7
Anthony Purcell	3
Kent Smith	8
Mark Dacey	6
Robert Mayhew	5

Semifinals
Mark Kehoe	4
Alan O'Leary	8
Kent Smith	5
Mark Dacey	7

To Qualifier 1
Alan O'Leary	0
Mark Dacey	8
Qualifier 1
Peter Burgess	1
Mark Dacey	8

===== B Event =====
Second Knockout		Semifinals		To Pre-qualifier 2
				Kent Smith	5
				Kevin Saccary	8
		Kevin Saccary	5
Scott Saunders	9	Scott Saunders	4
Anthony Purcell	5

Second Knockout		Semifinals		To Pre-qualifier 2
				Rob Harris	4
				Mark Kehoe	7
		Mark Kehoe	8
John Luckhurst	12	John Luckhurst	6
Trevor Archibald	10

Second Knockout
Steve Ogden	7
Marty Gavin	9
Chris Sutherland	10
Mark Robar	3

Quarterfinals
Brent MacDougall	7
Marty Gavin	5
Robert Mayhew	8
Chris Sutherland	7

Semifinals
Brent MacDougall	9
Robert Mayhew	6

To Pre-qualifier 2
Alan O'Leary	7
Brent MacDougall	5

Pre-qualifier 2
1	Peter Burgess	8
4	Kevin Saccary	2
3	Mark Kehoe	8
2	Alan O'Leary	3

Qualifier 2
Peter Burgess	7
Mark Kehoe	4

===== C Event =====
Third Knockout		Semifinals		To Pre-qualifier 3
				Kevin Saccary	4
				Marty Gavin	10
		Robert Mayhew	8
Marty Gavin	9	Marty Gavin	9
Chris Sutherland	7

Third Knockout
Steve Ogden	L
Mark Robar	W

Quarterfinals
Scott Saunders	8
Mark Robar	1

Semifinals
Kent Smith	6
Scott Saunders	7

To Pre-qualifier 3
Alan O'Leary	10
Scott Saunders	6

Third Knockout
Anthony Purcell	6
Trevor Archibald	5

Quarterfinals
John Luckhurst	6
Anthony Purcell	7

Semifinals
Rob Harris	9
Anthony Purcell	2

To Pre-qualifier 3
Brent MacDougall	7
Rob Harris	5

Pre-qualifier 3
1	Marty Gavin	4
4	Alan O'Leary	7
3	Brent MacDougall	6
2	Mark Kehoe	4

Qualifier 3
Alan O'Leary	10
Brent MacDougall	3
