= 2010 Nova Scotia Men's Molson Provincial Championship =

- Host city: Halifax, Nova Scotia
- Arena: Mayflower Curling Club
- Dates: February 3–7
- Winner: Team Fitzner-LeBlanc
- Curling club: Mayflower CC, Halifax
- Skip: Ian Fitzner-LeBlanc
- Third: Stuart MacLean
- Second: Kent Smith
- Lead: Phil Crowell
- Finalist: Doug MacKenzie

The 2010 Nova Scotia Men's Molson Provincial Championship was held February 3–7 at the Mayflower Curling Club in the Halifax Regional Municipality. The winning team, skipped by Ian Fitzner-LeBlanc represented Nova Scotia at the 2010 Tim Hortons Brier, also in Halifax.

== Teams ==
Skip	Third	Second	Lead	Curling club
Shawn Adams	Paul Flemming	Jeff Hopkins	Kelly Mittelstadt	Mayflower Curling Club, Halifax
Sean Audas	Tony Moore	Anthony Purcell	Rob Moore	CFB Halifax Curling Club, Halifax
Peter Burgess	Craig Burgess	Jared Brent	Todd Burgess	Truro Curling Club, Truro
Jamie Christianson	Dan Christianson	Todd Moors	Nelson Rice	CFB Halifax Curling Club, Halifax
Mark Dacey	Tom Sullivan	Andrew Gibson	Bruce Lohnes	Mayflower Curling Club, Halifax
Ian Fitzner-LeBlanc	Stuart MacLean	Kent Smith	Phil Crowell	Mayflower Curling Club, Halifax
Ryan Garven	Peter MacPhee	Brad Meisner	Rob MacArthur	Mayflower Curling Club, Halifax
Ian Juurlink	Paul Dexter	Jared Bowles	Trent Hilliard	Mayflower Curling Club, Halifax
Mark Kehoe	Curt Palmer	Kris Granchelli	Donnie Smith	Windsor Curling Club, Windsor
Brent MacDougall	Dave Stephenson	Kevin Lonergan	Jeremiah Anderson	Mayflower Curling Club, Halifax
Doug MacKenzie	Mike Bardsley	Dana Seward	Kyle Schmeisser	Mayflower Curling Club, Halifax
Jamie Murphy	Jordan Pinder	Jon Wamback	Donald McDermaid	Mayflower Curling Club, Halifax
Brian Rafuse	Ben Blanchard	Alan Darragh	Glen Josephson	Nova Scotia Curling Association
Mark Robar	Robby McLean	Kevin Patterson	Josh MacInnis	Nova Scotia Curling Association
Chad Stevens	Graham Breckon	Scott Saccary	Kevin Saccary	Chester Curling Club, Chester
Chris Sutherland	Glen MacLeod	Kevin Ouellette	Doug Bryant	Nova Scotia Curling Association

== Draw Brackets ==
=== A Event ===
Round of 16
Shawn Adams	5
Mark Robar	6
Doug MacKenzie	8
Peter Burgess	1
Jamie Murphy	8
Sean Audas	5
Mark Kehoe	8
Jamie Christianson	3
Ian Fitzner-LeBlanc	9
Ian Juurlink	6
Chad Stevens	2
Brent MacDougall	9
Chris Sutherland	10
Brian Rafuse	6
Mark Dacey	2
Ryan Garven	11

Quarter-finals
Mark Robar	4
Doug MacKenzie	10
Jamie Murphy	8
Mark Kehoe	4
Ian Fitzner-LeBlanc	8
Brent MacDougall	4
Chris Sutherland	9
Ryan Garven	6

Semi-finals
Doug MacKenzie	4
Jamie Murphy	9
Ian Fitzner-LeBlanc	9
Chris Sutherland	4

A Qualifier Match
Jamie Murphy	5
Ian Fitzner-LeBlanc	8

=== B Event ===
Round of 16
Sean Audas	12
Jamie Christianson	11
Ian Juurlink	7
Chad Stevens	6

Quarterfinals
Mark Robar	6
Sean Audas	7
Ryan Garven	4
Ian Juurlink	7

Semifinals
Chris Sutherland	9
Sean Audas	3
Doug MacKenzie	9
Ian Juurlink	5

Finals
Chris Sutherland	6
Doug MacKenzie	7
B Qualifier Match
Doug MacKenzie	7
Mark Kehoe	2

Round of 16
Shawn Adams	8
Peter Burgess	5
Brian Rafuse	7
Mark Dacey	4

Quarterfinals
Mark Kehoe	6
Shawn Adams	5
Brent MacDougall	5
Brian Rafuse	4

Semifinals
Mark Kehoe	7
Brent MacDougall	6

Finals
Jamie Murphy	10
Mark Kehoe	3

=== C Event ===
Quarterfinals
Mark Robar	9
Ryan Garven	2
Shawn Adams	6
Brian Rafuse	3

Semifinals
Jamie Murphy	7
Mark Robar	3
Chris Sutherland	5
Shawn Adams	8

C Qualifier Match
Jamie Murphy	9
Shawn Adams	8

Round of 16
Peter Burgess	11
Jamie Christianson	3
Chad Stevens	7
Mark Dacey	8

Quarterfinals
Peter Burgess	8
Mark Dacey	3

Semifinals
Shawn Audas	6
Ian Juurlink	8
Brent MacDougall	9
Peter Burgess	8

Finals
Ian Juurlink	10
Brent MacDougall	0
C Qualifier Match
Mark Kehoe	3
Ian Juurlink	4

== Playoffs ==
Page playoff system
A	Ian Fitzner-LeBlanc	8
B	Doug MacKenzie	7
C1	Jamie Murphy	6
C2	Ian Juurlink	3

Semifinal
B	Doug MacKenzie	6
C1	Jamie Murphy	4

Final
A	Ian Fitzner-LeBlanc	6
B	Doug MacKenzie	3

=== A vs. B ===
February 6

Sheet 3	1	2	3	4	5	6	7	8	9	10	Final
Ian Fitzner-LeBlanc	1	0	2	0	1	0	1	2	0	1	8
Doug MacKenzie	0	1	0	2	0	1	0	0	3	0	7

=== C1 vs. C2 ===
February 6

Sheet 4	1	2	3	4	5	6	7	8	9	10	Final
Jamie Murphy	2	1	0	0	0	2	0	1	0	X	6
Ian Juurlink	0	0	1	0	1	0	0	0	1	X	3

=== Semifinal ===
February 7

Sheet 3	1	2	3	4	5	6	7	8	9	10	Final
Jamie Murphy	0	0	1	0	0	1	1	1	0	X	4
Doug MacKenzie	1	1	0	1	1	0	0	0	2	X	6

=== Final ===
February 7

Sheet 3	1	2	3	4	5	6	7	8	9	10	Final
Ian Fitzner-LeBlanc	1	0	1	0	1	0	2	0	1	0	6
Doug MacKenzie	0	0	0	0	0	1	0	1	0	1	3
