= 2012 Nova Scotia Men's Molson Provincial Championship =

- Host city: Bridgewater, Nova Scotia
- Arena: Bridgewater Curling Club
- Dates: February 8–12
- Winner: Team Murphy
- Curling club: CFB Halifax CC, Halifax
- Skip: Jamie Murphy
- Third: Jordan Pinder
- Second: Mike Bardsley
- Lead: Donald McDermaid
- Finalist: Mark Dacey

The 2012 Nova Scotia Men's Molson Provincial Championship was held from February 8 to 12 at the Bridgewater Curling Club in Bridgewater, Nova Scotia. The winning team, skipped by Jamie Murphy, represented Nova Scotia at the 2012 Tim Hortons Brier in Saskatoon, Saskatchewan.

== Teams ==
| Skip | Third | Second | Lead | Club(s) |
|---|---|---|---|---|
| Peter Burgess | Jared Bent | Craig Burgess | Todd Burgess | Truro Curling Club, Truro |
| Mark Dacey | Tom Sullivan | Andrew Gibson | Travis Colter | Mayflower Curling Club, Halifax |
| Ian Fitzner-LeBlanc | Paul Flemming | Robbie Doherty | Kelly Mittelstadt | Mayflower Curling Club, Halifax |
| Ian Juurlink | Paul Dexter | Kendal Thompson | Tyler Gamble | Mayflower Curling Club, Halifax |
| Brent MacDougall | Lee Buott | Sean Audas | Neil Gallant | Mayflower Curling Club, Halifax |
| Jamie Murphy | Jordan Pinder | Mike Bardsley | Donald McDermaid | CFB Halifax Curling Club, Halifax |
| Kent Smith | Stuart MacLean | Mark Robar | Phil Crowell | Mayflower Curling Club, Halifax |
| Chad Stevens | Graham Breckon | Scott Saccary | Kevin Saccary | Chester Curling Club, Chester |

== Standings ==
| Skip (Club) | W | L | PF | PA | Ends Won | Ends Lost | Blank Ends | Stolen Ends |
|---|---|---|---|---|---|---|---|---|
| Jamie Murphy (CFB Halifax) | 5 | 2 | 48 | 34 | 32 | 24 | 5 | 12 |
| Mark Dacey (Mayflower) | 5 | 2 | 39 | 33 | 27 | 20 | 7 | 9 |
| Ian Fitzner-LeBlanc (Mayflower) | 5 | 2 | 43 | 37 | 28 | 24 | 9 | 10 |
| Kent Smith (Mayflower) | 4 | 3 | 40 | 41 | 28 | 27 | 5 | 8 |
| Peter Burgess (Truro) | 3 | 4 | 40 | 44 | 26 | 28 | 6 | 3 |
| Chad Stevens (Chester) | 3 | 4 | 46 | 31 | 25 | 28 | 9 | 9 |
| Brent MacDougall (Mayflower) | 2 | 5 | 28 | 40 | 21 | 33 | 8 | 2 |
| Ian Juurlink (Mayflower) | 1 | 6 | 28 | 45 | 22 | 28 | 12 | 5 |

== Results ==
=== Draw 1 ===
February 8, 9:00 AM

| Sheet A | 1 | 2 | 3 | 4 | 5 | 6 | 7 | 8 | 9 | 10 | Final |
|---|---|---|---|---|---|---|---|---|---|---|---|
| Burgess 🔨 | 1 | 0 | 2 | 0 | 3 | 0 | 1 | 0 | 1 | 0 | 8 |
| MacDougall | 0 | 2 | 0 | 1 | 0 | 2 | 0 | 3 | 0 | 1 | 9 |

| Sheet B | 1 | 2 | 3 | 4 | 5 | 6 | 7 | 8 | 9 | 10 | Final |
|---|---|---|---|---|---|---|---|---|---|---|---|
| Murphy 🔨 | 1 | 0 | 0 | 3 | 0 | 1 | 0 | 0 | 0 | X | 5 |
| Smith | 0 | 1 | 1 | 0 | 3 | 0 | 2 | 1 | 1 | X | 9 |

| Sheet C | 1 | 2 | 3 | 4 | 5 | 6 | 7 | 8 | 9 | 10 | Final |
|---|---|---|---|---|---|---|---|---|---|---|---|
| Juurlink | 0 | 1 | 0 | 0 | 1 | 0 | 1 | 1 | 0 | X | 4 |
| Dacey 🔨 | 3 | 0 | 0 | 1 | 0 | 2 | 0 | 0 | 2 | X | 8 |

| Sheet D | 1 | 2 | 3 | 4 | 5 | 6 | 7 | 8 | 9 | 10 | Final |
|---|---|---|---|---|---|---|---|---|---|---|---|
| Fitzner-LeBlanc | 3 | 0 | 1 | 0 | 2 | 0 | 0 | 0 | 0 | 1 | 7 |
| Stevens 🔨 | 0 | 0 | 0 | 2 | 0 | 2 | 1 | 0 | 1 | 0 | 6 |

=== Draw 2 ===
February 8, 2:00 PM

| Sheet A | 1 | 2 | 3 | 4 | 5 | 6 | 7 | 8 | 9 | 10 | Final |
|---|---|---|---|---|---|---|---|---|---|---|---|
| Juurlink | 0 | 0 | 0 | 0 | 2 | 0 | 1 | 0 | 2 | X | 5 |
| Smith 🔨 | 0 | 1 | 1 | 0 | 0 | 2 | 0 | 3 | 0 | X | 7 |

| Sheet B | 1 | 2 | 3 | 4 | 5 | 6 | 7 | 8 | 9 | 10 | Final |
|---|---|---|---|---|---|---|---|---|---|---|---|
| Fitzner-LeBlanc | 3 | 0 | 0 | 0 | 0 | 0 | 2 | 0 | 1 | 0 | 6 |
| Burgess 🔨 | 0 | 1 | 0 | 1 | 1 | 0 | 0 | 2 | 0 | 3 | 8 |

| Sheet C | 1 | 2 | 3 | 4 | 5 | 6 | 7 | 8 | 9 | 10 | Final |
|---|---|---|---|---|---|---|---|---|---|---|---|
| Stevens 🔨 | 0 | 1 | 0 | 1 | 1 | 0 | 2 | 1 | 0 | X | 6 |
| MacDougall | 0 | 0 | 0 | 0 | 0 | 1 | 0 | 0 | 1 | X | 2 |

| Sheet D | 1 | 2 | 3 | 4 | 5 | 6 | 7 | 8 | 9 | 10 | Final |
|---|---|---|---|---|---|---|---|---|---|---|---|
| Dacey | 0 | 0 | 0 | 2 | 0 | 2 | X | X | X | X | 4 |
| Murphy 🔨 | 4 | 1 | 1 | 0 | 3 | 0 | X | X | X | X | 9 |

=== Draw 3 ===
February 9, 9:00 AM

| Sheet A | 1 | 2 | 3 | 4 | 5 | 6 | 7 | 8 | 9 | 10 | Final |
|---|---|---|---|---|---|---|---|---|---|---|---|
| MacDougall 🔨 | 1 | 0 | 0 | 1 | 0 | 1 | 0 | 0 | 1 | X | 4 |
| Fitzner-LeBlanc | 0 | 1 | 1 | 0 | 1 | 0 | 2 | 1 | 0 | X | 6 |

| Sheet B | 1 | 2 | 3 | 4 | 5 | 6 | 7 | 8 | 9 | 10 | Final |
|---|---|---|---|---|---|---|---|---|---|---|---|
| Smith 🔨 | 0 | 0 | 0 | 0 | 1 | 0 | 1 | 0 | 1 | X | 3 |
| Dacey | 0 | 1 | 1 | 1 | 0 | 2 | 0 | 1 | 0 | X | 6 |

| Sheet C | 1 | 2 | 3 | 4 | 5 | 6 | 7 | 8 | 9 | 10 | Final |
|---|---|---|---|---|---|---|---|---|---|---|---|
| Murphy 🔨 | 0 | 1 | 1 | 0 | 0 | 0 | 1 | 0 | 2 | 1 | 6 |
| Juurlink | 0 | 0 | 0 | 1 | 2 | 1 | 0 | 1 | 0 | 0 | 5 |

| Sheet D | 1 | 2 | 3 | 4 | 5 | 6 | 7 | 8 | 9 | 10 | Final |
|---|---|---|---|---|---|---|---|---|---|---|---|
| Stevens | 0 | 1 | 3 | 0 | 2 | 0 | 0 | 2 | X | X | 8 |
| Burgess 🔨 | 0 | 0 | 0 | 1 | 0 | 1 | 1 | 0 | X | X | 3 |

=== Draw 4 ===
February 9, 2:00 PM

| Sheet A | 1 | 2 | 3 | 4 | 5 | 6 | 7 | 8 | 9 | 10 | Final |
|---|---|---|---|---|---|---|---|---|---|---|---|
| Stevens | 0 | 0 | 3 | 0 | 0 | 2 | 0 | 0 | 0 | X | 5 |
| Murphy 🔨 | 1 | 2 | 0 | 2 | 0 | 0 | 1 | 2 | 1 | X | 9 |

| Sheet B | 1 | 2 | 3 | 4 | 5 | 6 | 7 | 8 | 9 | 10 | Final |
|---|---|---|---|---|---|---|---|---|---|---|---|
| Burgess 🔨 | 1 | 0 | 0 | 0 | 1 | 0 | 1 | 1 | 0 | 4 | 8 |
| Juurlink | 0 | 1 | 2 | 1 | 0 | 0 | 0 | 0 | 1 | 0 | 5 |

| Sheet C | 1 | 2 | 3 | 4 | 5 | 6 | 7 | 8 | 9 | 10 | Final |
|---|---|---|---|---|---|---|---|---|---|---|---|
| Smith | 0 | 0 | 0 | 0 | 0 | 2 | X | X | X | X | 2 |
| Fitzner-LeBlanc 🔨 | 0 | 2 | 1 | 2 | 1 | 0 | X | X | X | X | 6 |

| Sheet D | 1 | 2 | 3 | 4 | 5 | 6 | 7 | 8 | 9 | 10 | Final |
|---|---|---|---|---|---|---|---|---|---|---|---|
| MacDougall | 0 | 0 | 0 | 0 | 2 | 0 | 0 | 0 | 1 | X | 3 |
| Dacey 🔨 | 0 | 1 | 1 | 0 | 0 | 1 | 1 | 1 | 0 | X | 5 |

=== Draw 5 ===
February 9, 7:00 PM

| Sheet A | 1 | 2 | 3 | 4 | 5 | 6 | 7 | 8 | 9 | 10 | Final |
|---|---|---|---|---|---|---|---|---|---|---|---|
| Fitzner- LeBlanc 🔨 | 3 | 0 | 0 | 0 | 0 | 2 | 1 | X | X | X | 6 |
| Juurlink | 0 | 0 | 0 | 0 | 1 | 0 | 0 | X | X | X | 1 |

| Sheet B | 1 | 2 | 3 | 4 | 5 | 6 | 7 | 8 | 9 | 10 | Final |
|---|---|---|---|---|---|---|---|---|---|---|---|
| MacDougall | 0 | 0 | 0 | 0 | 1 | 0 | 1 | 0 | X | X | 2 |
| Murphy 🔨 | 1 | 2 | 1 | 1 | 0 | 1 | 0 | 1 | X | X | 7 |

| Sheet C | 1 | 2 | 3 | 4 | 5 | 6 | 7 | 8 | 9 | 10 | Final |
|---|---|---|---|---|---|---|---|---|---|---|---|
| Dacey | 0 | 0 | 1 | 0 | 1 | 0 | X | X | X | X | 2 |
| Stevens 🔨 | 2 | 0 | 0 | 5 | 0 | 0 | X | X | X | X | 7 |

| Sheet D | 1 | 2 | 3 | 4 | 5 | 6 | 7 | 8 | 9 | 10 | Final |
|---|---|---|---|---|---|---|---|---|---|---|---|
| Burgess 🔨 | 2 | 0 | 4 | 0 | 2 | 0 | 1 | X | X | X | 9 |
| Smith | 0 | 2 | 0 | 1 | 0 | 1 | 0 | X | X | X | 4 |

=== Draw 6 ===
February 10, 2:00 PM

| Sheet A | 1 | 2 | 3 | 4 | 5 | 6 | 7 | 8 | 9 | 10 | Final |
|---|---|---|---|---|---|---|---|---|---|---|---|
| Dacey 🔨 | 2 | 0 | 1 | 1 | 1 | 0 | X | X | X | X | 5 |
| Burgess | 0 | 0 | 0 | 0 | 0 | 1 | X | X | X | X | 1 |

| Sheet B | 1 | 2 | 3 | 4 | 5 | 6 | 7 | 8 | 9 | 10 | Final |
|---|---|---|---|---|---|---|---|---|---|---|---|
| Juurlink | 0 | 0 | 2 | 0 | 1 | 0 | 2 | 1 | 1 | X | 7 |
| Stevens 🔨 | 1 | 0 | 0 | 2 | 0 | 2 | 0 | 0 | 0 | X | 5 |

| Sheet C | 1 | 2 | 3 | 4 | 5 | 6 | 7 | 8 | 9 | 10 | Final |
|---|---|---|---|---|---|---|---|---|---|---|---|
| MacDougall 🔨 | 0 | 1 | 0 | 0 | 0 | 0 | 0 | 2 | 0 | X | 3 |
| Smith | 0 | 0 | 1 | 1 | 1 | 1 | 1 | 0 | 2 | X | 7 |

| Sheet D | 1 | 2 | 3 | 4 | 5 | 6 | 7 | 8 | 9 | 10 | 11 | Final |
|---|---|---|---|---|---|---|---|---|---|---|---|---|
| Murphy 🔨 | 0 | 0 | 1 | 0 | 0 | 0 | 0 | 1 | 3 | 0 | 0 | 5 |
| Fitzner-LeBlanc | 0 | 0 | 0 | 0 | 1 | 1 | 1 | 0 | 0 | 2 | 1 | 6 |

=== Draw 7 ===
February 10, 7:00 PM

| Sheet A | 1 | 2 | 3 | 4 | 5 | 6 | 7 | 8 | 9 | 10 | 11 | Final |
|---|---|---|---|---|---|---|---|---|---|---|---|---|
| Smith 🔨 | 0 | 2 | 0 | 1 | 0 | 3 | 0 | 1 | 0 | 0 | 1 | 8 |
| Stevens | 1 | 0 | 1 | 0 | 1 | 0 | 2 | 0 | 1 | 1 | 0 | 7 |

| Sheet B | 1 | 2 | 3 | 4 | 5 | 6 | 7 | 8 | 9 | 10 | Final |
|---|---|---|---|---|---|---|---|---|---|---|---|
| Dacey 🔨 | 1 | 0 | 2 | 0 | 3 | 0 | 1 | 0 | 2 | X | 9 |
| Fitzner-LeBlanc | 0 | 2 | 0 | 1 | 0 | 2 | 0 | 1 | 0 | X | 6 |

| Sheet C | 1 | 2 | 3 | 4 | 5 | 6 | 7 | 8 | 9 | 10 | Final |
|---|---|---|---|---|---|---|---|---|---|---|---|
| Burgess | 0 | 0 | 0 | 1 | 0 | 1 | 0 | 1 | 0 | X | 3 |
| Murphy 🔨 | 0 | 2 | 2 | 0 | 1 | 0 | 1 | 0 | 1 | X | 7 |

| Sheet D | 1 | 2 | 3 | 4 | 5 | 6 | 7 | 8 | 9 | 10 | Final |
|---|---|---|---|---|---|---|---|---|---|---|---|
| Juurlink | 0 | 0 | 0 | 0 | 1 | 0 | 0 | 0 | X | X | 1 |
| MacDougall 🔨 | 1 | 0 | 0 | 0 | 0 | 2 | 1 | 1 | X | X | 5 |

== Playoffs ==
Page playoff system
1 | Jamie Murphy | 5
2 | Mark Dacey | 3
3 | Ian Fitzner-LeBlanc | 3
4 | Kent Smith | 8

Semifinal
2 | Mark Dacey | 7
4 | Kent Smith | 6

Final
1 | Jamie Murphy | 7
2 | Mark Dacey | 5

=== 1 vs. 2 ===
February 11, 2:00 PM

| Sheet A | 1 | 2 | 3 | 4 | 5 | 6 | 7 | 8 | 9 | 10 | Final |
|---|---|---|---|---|---|---|---|---|---|---|---|
| Murphy 🔨 | 1 | 0 | 0 | 2 | 0 | 0 | 1 | 0 | 1 | X | 5 |
| Dacey | 0 | 0 | 1 | 0 | 1 | 0 | 0 | 1 | 0 | X | 3 |

=== 3 vs. 4 ===
February 11, 2:00 PM

| Sheet A | 1 | 2 | 3 | 4 | 5 | 6 | 7 | 8 | 9 | 10 | Final |
|---|---|---|---|---|---|---|---|---|---|---|---|
| Fitzner-LeBlanc 🔨 | 1 | 0 | 1 | 0 | 0 | 1 | 0 | 0 | X | X | 3 |
| Smith | 0 | 1 | 0 | 1 | 0 | 0 | 4 | 2 | X | X | 8 |

=== Semifinal ===
February 11, 7:00 PM

| Sheet A | 1 | 2 | 3 | 4 | 5 | 6 | 7 | 8 | 9 | 10 | 11 | Final |
|---|---|---|---|---|---|---|---|---|---|---|---|---|
| Dacey 🔨 | 2 | 0 | 0 | 0 | 2 | 0 | 0 | 2 | 0 | 0 | 1 | 7 |
| Smith | 0 | 0 | 1 | 1 | 0 | 1 | 1 | 0 | 1 | 1 | 0 | 6 |

=== Final ===
February 12, 2:00 PM

| Sheet A | 1 | 2 | 3 | 4 | 5 | 6 | 7 | 8 | 9 | 10 | Final |
|---|---|---|---|---|---|---|---|---|---|---|---|
| Murphy 🔨 | 2 | 3 | 0 | 0 | 0 | 1 | 0 | 1 | 0 | X | 7 |
| Dacey | 0 | 0 | 1 | 0 | 1 | 0 | 2 | 0 | 1 | X | 5 |

2012 Nova Scotia Men's Molson Provincial Championship

Jamie Murphy
Nova Scotia Provincial Championship title
