= 2015 Clearwater Men's Provincial Championship =

- Host city: Halifax, Nova Scotia
- Arena: Halifax Curling Club
- Dates: February 4–8
- Winner: Glen MacLeod
- Curling club: Mayflower CC, Halifax
- Skip: Glen MacLeod
- Fourth: Peter Burgess
- Second: Colten Steele
- Lead: Rob McLean
- Finalist: Jamie Murphy

The 2015 Clearwater Men's Provincial Championship, the provincial men's curling championship of Nova Scotia, was held from February 4 to 8 at the Halifax Curling Club in Halifax. The winning Glen MacLeod team represented Nova Scotia at the 2015 Tim Hortons Brier in Calgary.

== Teams ==
Skip	Third	Second	Lead	Alternate	Club(s)
Mark Dacey	Stuart Thompson	Steve Burgess	Andrew Gibson	Shawn Adams	Mayflower Curling Club, Halifax
Paul Dexter	Mark Robar	Neil Gallant	Tommy Bragnalo	Kirk MacDiarmaid	Mayflower Curling Club, Halifax
Ian Fitzner-LeBlanc	Ian Juurrlink	Graham Breckon	Kelly Mittelstadt		Lakeshore Curling Club, Lower Sackville
Peter Burgess (fourth)	Glen MacLeod (skip)	Colten Steele	Rob McLean		Mayflower Curling Club, Halifax
Robert Mayhew	Michael Brophy	Nick Burdock	Ben Creaser		Mayflower Curling Club, Halifax
Jamie Murphy	Jordan Pinder	Scott Babin	Tyler Gamble	Mike Bardsley	Lakeshore Curling Club, Lower Sackville
Chad Stevens	Cameron MacKenzie	Scott Saccary	Philip Crowell		Mayflower Curling Club, Halifax
Tom Sullivan	Paul Flemming	Travis Colter	Donald McDermaid	Stuart MacLean	Mayflower Curling Club, Halifax

== Round robin standings ==
Final Round Robin Standings

Key
Teams to Playoffs
Teams to Tiebreaker

Skip	W	L
MacLeod	5	2
Murphy	5	2
Stevens	5	2
Dacey	4	3
Fitzner-Leblanc	4	3
Dexter	3	4
Sullivan	2	5
Mayhew	0	7

== Scores ==
=== February 4 ===
Draw 1

- Dacey 6-5 Fitzner-Leblanc
- Murphy 7-2 Mayhew
- Stevens 8-4 Dexter
- MacLeod 5-3 Sullivan

Draw 2

- Dexter 8-3 Mayhew
- Dacey 7-4 Sullivan
- Fitzner-Leblanc 7-6 MacLeod
- Murphy 7-5 Stevens

=== February 5 ===
Draw 3

- Fitzner-Leblanc 7-6 Sullivan
- Stevens 10-5 Mayhew
- Murphy 10-5 Dexter
- MacLeod 8-6 Dacey

Draw 4

- MacLeod 6-4 Murphy
- Dacey 8-4 Dexter
- Sullivan 6-4 Mayhew
- Stevens 8-6 Fitzner-Leblanc

Draw 5

- Dexter 8-4 Sullivan
- Fitzner-Leblanc 6-5 Murphy
- Stevens 5-3 MacLeod
- Dacey 10-6 Mayhew

=== February 6 ===
Draw 6

- Stevens 9–8 Dacey
- Dexter 5–6 MacLeod
- Fitzner-Leblanc 7–3 Mayhew
- Murphy 8–3 Sullivan

Draw 7

- Mayhew 5–6 MacLeod
- Stevens 5–6 Sullivan
- Dacey 1–6 Murphy
- Dexter 8–7 Fitzner-Leblanc

== Tiebreaker ==
Saturday, February 7, 8:00 am

Team	1	2	3	4	5	6	7	8	9	10	Final
Mark Dacey 🔨	4	0	1	0	1	0	1	0	0	1	8
Ian Fitzner-Leblanc	0	0	0	2	0	2	0	1	0	0	5

== Playoffs ==
Page playoff system
1	Glen MacLeod	4
2	Jamie Murphy	3
3	Chad Stevens	5
4	Mark Dacey	4

Semifinal
2	Jamie Murphy	9
3	Chad Stevens	4

Final
1	Glen MacLeod	8
2	Jamie Murphy	5

=== 1 vs. 2 ===
Saturday, February 7, 2:00 pm

Team	1	2	3	4	5	6	7	8	9	10	Final
Glen MacLeod 🔨	0	2	0	0	0	0	0	0	1	1	4
Jamie Murphy	0	0	1	1	0	0	0	1	0	0	3

=== 3 vs. 4 ===
Saturday, February 7, 2:00 pm

Team	1	2	3	4	5	6	7	8	9	10	Final
Chad Stevens 🔨	0	0	0	0	2	0	0	1	0	2	5
Mark Dacey	0	0	0	1	0	2	0	0	1	0	4

=== Semifinal ===
Saturday, February 7, 7:00 pm

Team	1	2	3	4	5	6	7	8	9	10	Final
Jamie Murphy 🔨	0	0	2	0	3	0	0	3	1	X	9
Chad Stevens	0	0	0	2	0	2	0	0	0	X	4

=== Final ===
Sunday, February 8, 2:00 pm

Team	1	2	3	4	5	6	7	8	9	10	Final
Glen MacLeod 🔨	0	3	0	0	2	0	3	0	0	X	8
Jamie Murphy	0	0	0	1	0	1	0	2	1	X	5

2015 Clearwater Men's Provincial Championship

Glen MacLeod
2nd Nova Scotia Provincial Championship title
