= 2018 Deloitte Tankard =

- Host city: Dartmouth, Nova Scotia
- Arena: Dartmouth Curling Club
- Dates: January 8–14
- Winner: Team Murphy
- Curling club: Halifax Curling Club
- Skip: Jamie Murphy
- Third: Paul Flemming
- Second: Scott Saccary
- Lead: Phil Crowell
- Finalist: Mark Dacey

The 2018 Deloitte Tankard, the provincial men's curling championship of Nova Scotia, was held from January 8 to 14 at the Dartmouth Curling Club in Dartmouth. The winning Jamie Murphy team represented Nova Scotia at the 2018 Tim Hortons Brier in Regina, Saskatchewan.

== Teams ==
Teams are as follows:

Skip	Third	Second	Lead	Alternate	Club(s)
Mark Dacey	Andrew Gibson	Stephen Burgess	Luke Saunders		Mayflower Curling Club, Halifax
Mike Flemming	Kevin Ouellette	Kris Granchelli	Donald McDermaid	Mike Bardsley	Mayflower Curling Club, Halifax
Brent MacDougall	Marty Gavin	Kirk MacDiarmid	Adam Berry		Mayflower Curling Club, Halifax
Jamie Murphy	Paul Flemming	Scott Saccary	Phil Crowell		Halifax Curling Club, Halifax
Greg Power	Alex Rafuse	Greg Rafuse	Scott Graham		Halifax Curling Club, Halifax
Chad Stevens	Cameron MacKenzie	Ian Juurlink	Kelly Mittelstadt	Graham Breckon	Mayflower Curling Club, Halifax
Kendal Thompson	Bryce Everist	Jamie Danbrook	Jared Brown		Mayflower Curling Club, Halifax
Stuart Thompson	Colten Steele	Travis Colter	Taylor Ardiel	Bill MacPhee	Dartmouth Curling Club, Dartmouth

== Round-robin standings ==
Key
Teams to Playoffs
Teams to Tiebreaker

Skip	W	L
Jamie Murphy	5	2
Mark Dacey	5	2
Kendal Thompson	4	3
Stuart Thompson	4	3
Chad Stevens	4	3
Mike Flemming	2	5
Brent MacDougall	2	5
Greg Power	2	5

== Scores ==
=== January 9 ===
Draw 1

- Stevens 9-4 Power
- Dacey 7-6 MacDougall
- Murphy 10-2 Flemming
- K. Thompson 10-9 S. Thompson

=== January 10 ===
Draw 2

- MacDougall 7-6 Murphy
- K. Thompson 6-5 Stevens
- S. Thompson 9-6 Power
- Dacey 8-2 Flemming

Draw 3

- S. Thompson 9-6 Flemming
- Murphy 8-2 Power
- Dacey 4-7 K. Thompson
- Stevens 6-5 MacDougall

=== January 11 ===
Draw 4

- Murphy 7-1 Dacey
- S. Thompson 4-5 Stevens
- MacDougall 8-9 Flemming
- K. Thompson 4-5 Power

Draw 5

- Stevens 8-4 Flemming
- Dacey 8-3 Power
- Murphy 12-6 K. Thompson
- S. Thompson 10-3 MacDougall

=== January 12 ===
Draw 6

- S. Thompson 6-8 Dacey
- K. Thompson 7-10 Flemming
- MacDougall 10-9 Power
- Murphy 8-3 Stevens

Draw 7

- K. Thompson 10-6 MacDougall
- Murphy 6-7 S. Thompson
- Dacey 7-6 Stevens
- Power 4-3 Flemming

=== January 13 ===
Tiebreaker 1

- Stevens 4-10 S. Thompson

Tiebreaker 2

- K. Thompson 5-7 S. Thompson

== Playoffs ==
Semifinal			Final
			1	Jamie Murphy	9
2	Mark Dacey	11	2	Mark Dacey	5
3	Stuart Thompson	5

=== Semifinal ===
Saturday, January 13, 1:00 pm

Sheet C	1	2	3	4	5	6	7	8	9	10	Final
Mark Dacey	1	0	1	0	1	0	4	0	4	X	11
Stuart Thompson	0	1	0	0	0	3	0	1	0	X	5

=== Final ===
Sunday, January 14, 9:00am

Sheet C	1	2	3	4	5	6	7	8	9	10	Final
Jamie Murphy	1	1	0	3	3	0	1	0	X	X	9
Mark Dacey	0	0	1	0	0	2	0	2	X	X	5

2018 Deloitte Tankard

Jamie Murphy
5th Nova Scotia Provincial Championship title
