= Nova Scotia Tankard =

Curling competition

Ocean Contractors Men's Curling Championship
- Established: 1927
- 2026 host city: Halifax, Nova Scotia
- 2026 arena: Halifax Curling Club
- 2026 champion: Kendal Thompson

Current edition
- 2026 Ocean Contractors Men's Curling Championship

The Ocean Contractors Men's Curling Championship is the Nova Scotia provincial championship for men's curling. The tournament is run by the Nova Scotia Curling Association. The winner represents Team Nova Scotia at the Montana's Brier.

Previously, it was known as the Johnson Cup (1927–1939); British Consols (1940–1979), the Labatt Tankard, Keith's Tankard, Molson Scotia Cup, Molson Coors Tankard (2013–2014), Clearwater Men's Provincial Championship (2015), the East Coast Credit Union Tankard (2016), the Deloitte Tankard (2017–2020), the Nova Scotia Tankard (2023), and the Ocean Contractors Tankard (2024).

== Winners ==
Year	Skip	Club
2026	Kendal Thompson, Stuart Thompson, Bryce Everist, Michael Brophy	Halifax Curling Club
2025	Owen Purcell, Luke Saunders, Scott Saccary, Ryan Abraham	Halifax Curling Club
2024	Matthew Manuel, Luke Saunders, Jeffrey Meagher, Nick Zachernuk	Halifax Curling Club
2023	Matthew Manuel, Luke Saunders, Jeffrey Meagher, Nick Zachernuk	Halifax Curling Club
2022	Cancelled due to the COVID-19 pandemic in Nova Scotia. Team Paul Flemming invited to represent Nova Scotia at Brier	
2021	Cancelled due to the COVID-19 pandemic in Nova Scotia. Scott McDonald, Paul Flemming, Scott Saccary and Philip Crowell invited to represent Nova Scotia at Brier	
2020	Jamie Murphy, Paul Flemming, Scott Saccary, Philip Crowell	Halifax Curling Club
2019	Stuart Thompson, Colten Steele, Travis Colter, Taylor Ardiel	Dartmouth Curling Club
2018	Jamie Murphy, Paul Flemming, Scott Saccary, Philip Crowell	Halifax Curling Club
2017	Jamie Murphy, Jordan Pinder, Scott Saccary, Philip Crowell	Halifax Curling Club
2016	Jamie Murphy, Jordan Pinder, Scott Saccary, Philip Crowell	Mayflower Curling Club
2015	Glen MacLeod, Peter Burgess, Colten Steele, Robby MacLean	Mayflower Curling Club
2014	Jamie Murphy, Jordan Pinder, Mike Bardsley, Donald MacDermaid	Lakeshore Curling Club
2013	Ian Fitzner-Leblanc, Paul Flemming (skip), Graham Breckon, Kelly Mittelstadt	Lakeshore Curling Club
2012	Jamie Murphy, Jordan Pinder, Mike Bardsley, Donald MacDermaid	CFB Halifax Curling Club
2011	Shawn Adams, Paul Flemming, Andrew Gibson, Kelly Mittelstadt	Mayflower Curling Club
2010	Ian Fitzner-Leblanc, Stuart MacLean, Kent Smith, Philip Crowell	Mayflower Curling Club
2009	Mark Dacey, Bruce Lohnes, Andrew Gibson, Kris Granchelli	Mayflower Curling Club
2008	Brian Rafuse, Curt Palmer, Alan Darragh, Dave Slauenwhite	Bridgewater Curling Club
2007	Mark Kehoe, Curt Palmer, Doug Bryant, Richard Barker	Windsor Curling Club
2006	Mark Dacey, Bruce Lohnes, Rob Harris, Andrew Gibson	Mayflower Curling Club
2005	Shawn Adams, Paul Flemming, Craig Burgess, Kelly Mittelstadt	Bridgewater Curling Club
2004	Mark Dacey, Bruce Lohnes, Rob Harris, Andrew Gibson	Mayflower Curling Club
2003	Mark Dacey, Bruce Lohnes, Rob Harris, Andrew Gibson	Mayflower Curling Club
2002	Shawn Adams, Craig Burgess, Jeff Hopkins, Ben Blanchard	Bridgewater Curling Club
2001	Mark Dacey, Paul Flemming, Blayne Iskiw, Tom Fetterly	Mayflower Curling Club
2000	Shawn Adams, Jeff Hopkins, Ben Blanchard, Jason Blanchard	Bridgewater Curling Club
1999	Paul Flemming, Blaine Iskew, Andy Dauphinee, Tom Fetterly	Mayflower Curling Club
1998	Paul Flemming, Glen MacLeod, Andy Dauphinee, Tom Fetterly	Mayflower Curling Club
1997	Lowell Goulden, Bill Robinson, Georg Ernst, Kris MacLeod	Dartmouth Curling Club
1996	Brian Rafuse, Curt Palmer, Dave Slauenwhite, Glenn Josephson	Bridgewater Curling Club
1995	Bruce Lohnes, Craig Burgess, Chuck Patriquin, Dave Clarke	Truro Curling Club
1994	Alan O'Leary, Jim Walsh, Steve Johnston, Steve Piggott	Dartmouth Curling Club
1993	Alan O'Leary, Bob LeClair, Steve Johnston, Steve Piggott	Dartmouth Curling Club
1992	Dave Jones, Bruce Lohnes, Jeff Henderson, Vance LeCocq	CFB Halifax Curling Club
1991	Dan Bentley, Jim Walsh, Darren Bentley, George Xidos	Halifax Curling Club
1990	Alan Darragh, Peter MacPhee, Dave Wallace, Brad McCaughan	Dartmouth Curling Club
1989	Ragnar Kamp, Bruce Lohnes, Rod McCarron, Peter Neily	Truro Curling Club
1988	Thomas Hakansson, Stuart MacLean, Bill Robinson, Dave Wallace	Dartmouth Curling Club
1987	Ted Hennigar, Max Rastelli, Chris Fulton, Greg Hilliard	Stellar Curling Club
1986	Bill Campbell, Guy LaRocque, Mike Wilson, Don Sweete	Mayflower Curling Club
1985	Tom Hakansson, Peter MacPhee, Stuart MacLean, Dave Wallace	Dartmouth Curling Club
1984	Ragnar Kamp, Vic Langille, Rod McCarron, Haylett Clarke	Bluenose Curling Club
1983	Steve Ogden, Jack Robar, Bob MacDonald, Andy Dauphinee	Mayflower Curling Club
1982	Lowell Goulden, Peter MacPhee, Bruce MacArthur, Dave Wallace	Dartmouth Curling Club
1981	Alan Darragh, Tom Fetterly, Mike Currie, Brent Cotter	Dartmouth Curling Club
1980	Peter Hope, Peter MacPhee, Gary Clarke, Don MacLeod	Dartmouth Curling Club
1979	Alan Darragh, Peter MacPhee, Mike Currie, Dave Durrant	Dartmouth Curling Club
1978	Alan Darragh, Peter MacPhee, Mike Currie, Lowell Goulden	Dartmouth Curling Club
1977	Bob Fitzner, Bruce MacArthur, John McBain, Terry Aho	CFB Halifax Curling Club
1976	Alf Romain, Doug Arnold, Stu Cameron, Guy LaRocque	Mayflower Curling Club
1975	Dick Boyce, Bob Margeson, Mike Currie, Peter Comstock	Dartmouth Curling Club
1974	Barry Sharer, Ken Langille, Tom Fetterly, Robert Little	Halifax Curling Club
1973	Peter Hope, Jim Florian, Eugene Mattatall, Bob Margeson	Dartmouth Curling Club
1972	Barry Shearer, Ken Langille, Ed Morgan, Robin Wilber	Halifax Curling Club
1971	Frank Hoar, Doug Carter, J. M. Sanford, Don Fulton	Truro Curling Club
1970	Ron Franklyn, Peter Corkum, Stu Cameron, Nick Oxner	Mayflower Curling Club
1969	Peter Hope, Eugene Mattatall, Bob Margeson, Reg Beaver	Dartmouth Curling Club
1968	Don Flemming, Charlie Piper Jr., Greg Jeans, Dave Conrad	Mayflower Curling Club
1967	Ron Franklyn, Peter Corkum, John Oyler, John Hawkins	Mayflower Curling Club
1966	Vic Snarr, Ken Bell, Don Green, Bob Cunningham	Halifax Curling Club
1965	Ron Franklyn, Peter Corkum, John Hawkins, Laddy Farquhar	Mayflower Curling Club
1964	Ian Baird, Don Campbell, J. Duncan Smith, Moe Kennie	Glooscap Curling Club
1963	Ian Baird, Don Campbell, J. Duncan Smith, Moe Kennie	Glooscap Curling Club
1962	Jim Florian, Peter Hope, Ken Bell, Don Stanhope	Dartmouth Curling Club
1961	Jim Florian, Peter Hope, Ken Bell, Don Stanhope	Dartmouth Curling Club
1960	Ian Baird, George Hanson, Robert A. Mann, J. Duncan Smith	Glooscap Curling Club
1959	Art Forbes, Morell Darragh, K. Lawrence Carter, Sidney Chabassol	Amherst Curling Club
1958	Don Bauld, H. E. Spencer, A. C. Cole, D'Arcy Sullivan	Halifax Curling Club
1957	Ralph Simmons, W. Pennell Richardson, R. H. Rafuse, I. W. Rhodenizer	Bridgewater Curling Club
1956	Gerry Glintz, Avard Mann, Frank Hoare, Ted Henry	Truro Curling Club
1955	Gerry Glintz, Avard Mann, Frank Hoare, Ted Henry	Truro Curling Club
1954	Reg Piercy, Wes Burge, Charlie Piper Sr., Bill Peters	Mayflower Curling Club
1953	Barney Haines, Ralph Simmons, W. Pennell Richardson, Lee Rhodenizer	Bridgewater Curling Club
1952	Henry Blanchard, Avard Mann, Ted Henry, Larry Hatfield	Truro Curling Club
1951	Don Oyler, George Hanson, Fred Dyke, Wally Knock	Glooscap Curling Club
1950	Barney Haines, Eric Joudrey, Ralph Simmons, Lee Rhodenizer	Bridgewater Curling Club
1949	Horace Webb, U. L. Harrington, W. S. Cleveland, E. J. Sievart	Halifax Curling Club
1948	Gerry Glintz, Mike Vallis, Parker Rudderham, Stewart MacVicar	Sydney Curling Club
1947	R. Jeffrey Flinn, Harold Lenaghan, Reg Piercy, W. L. Ward	Mayflower Curling Club
1946	George MacIntosh, J. A. Snow, W. S. Cleveland, H. A. Williams	Halifax Curling Club
1945	Gerry Glintz, G. K. MacIntosh, J. A. Snow, H. A. Williams	Halifax Curling Club
1944	Gerry Glintz, G. K. MacIntosh, J. A. Snow, H. A. Williams	Halifax Curling Club
1943	L. D. Hopkins, F. W. Heath, J. L. Boyer, R. G. Bond	Dartmouth Curling Club
1942	Irving Hebb, H. W. Rafuse, W. P. Bickle, Frank Cook	Bridgewater Curling Club
1941	Fred Heath, Duncan A. Campbell, L. M. Adamson, L. D. Hopkins	Dartmouth Curling Club
1940	Stanley Rafuse, J. I. Hebb, W. P. Bickle, Frank Cook	Bridgewater Curling Club
1939	Charles Durant, Frank Arthur, John Wood, L. H. Norman	Mayflower Curling Club
1938	Charles Durant, Frank Arthur, John Wood, Ned Sim	Mayflower Curling Club
1937	Hugh Ferguson, Vic Crowe, Charles Cox, George Thomas	Truro Curling Club
1936	Murray Macneill, J. R. Murphy, Charles Burchell, A. L. Harrington	Halifax Curling Club
1935	Charles Durant, H. M. MacLeod, Cyril Burke, Frank Arthur	Mayflower Curling Club
1934	Harold Anslow, Logan Smith, Everett Knowles, Karl Dimock	Windsor Curling Club
1933	J. A. Cunningham, Henry MacCulloch, J. R. Murray, Harry Sutherland	Bluenose Curling Club
1932	Murray Macneill, Cliff Torey, Jim Donahue, F. O. Robertson	Halifax Curling Club
1931	Henry McLeod, Charles Durant, J. R. Murray, H. W. Gates	Mayflower Curling Club
1930	Murray Macneill, J. A. MacInnes, Jim Donahue, J. M. Murphy	Halifax Curling Club
1929	H. St. Clair Silver, J. A. MacInnes, Jim Donahue, L. E. Sievert	Halifax Curling Club
1928	Henry Stevenson, Hugh Ross, W. D. MacKay, L. B. Lynch	Sydney Curling Club
1927	Murray Macneill, J. A. MacInnes, Cliff Torey, Jim Donahue	Halifax Curling Club
