= The Curling Store Cashspiel =

World Curling Tour event

- Established: 2004
- Host city: Lower Sackville, Nova Scotia
- Arena: Lakeshore Curling Club
- Purse: $5,800
- 2023 champion: (Nova Scotia) Jessica Daigle

The Curling Store Cashspiel is an annual bonspiel, or curling tournament, held at the Lakeshore Curling Club in Lower Sackville, Nova Scotia. It has been an on and off event of the Men's and Women's World Curling Tour since 2004 under many different names. The tournament is held in a round robin format. In 2004, it was held as an open event to both men's and women's teams.

== Previous names ==
- 2004: Lakeshore Curling Club Cashspiel
- 2014: Gibson's Cashspiel
- 2015: Appelton Rum Cashspiel
- 2016–2017: Lakeshore Curling Club Cashspiel
- 2018–present: The Curling Store Cashspiel

== Past Champions ==
=== Men ===
Year	Winner	Runner up	Purse (CDN)
2014	(Nova Scotia) Jamie Danbrook, Kendal Thompson, Bryce Everist, Brendan Lavell	(Nova Scotia) Chad Stevens, Cameron MacKenzie, Scott Saccary, Phil Crowell	$8,100
2015	(Nova Scotia) Brent MacDougall, Kevin Ouellette, Kris Granchelli, Rob Moore	(Nova Scotia) Jamie Danbrook, Kendal Thompson, Bryce Everist, Brendan Lavell	$7,800
2016	(Nova Scotia) Stuart Thompson, Colton Steele, Travis Colter, Alex MacNeil	(Nova Scotia) Chad Stevens, Cameron MacKenzie, Ian Juurlink, Kelly Mittelstadt	$5,250
2017	(Nova Scotia) Kendal Thompson, Bryce Everist, Jamie Danbrook, Jared Brown	(Nova Scotia) Stuart Thompson, Colton Steele, Travis Colter, Taylor Ardiel	$5,250
2018	(Nova Scotia) Stuart Thompson, Colton Steele, Travis Colter, Taylor Ardiel	(Nova Scotia) Ian Fitzer-LeBlanc, Cameron MacKenzie, Mark Robar, Jeff Wilson	$4,250
2019	(Nova Scotia) Stuart Thompson, Colton Steele, Cameron MacKenzie, Travis Colter	(Nova Scotia) Kendal Thompson, Bryce Everist, Chris MacRae, Michael Brophy	$7,200
2020	(Nova Scotia) Travis Colter, Cameron MacKenzie, Ian Juurlink, Robby McLean	(Nova Scotia) Chad Stevens, Peter Burgess, Graham Breckon, Kelly Mittelstadt	$5,250
2021	(Nova Scotia) Cameron MacKenzie (Fourth), Travis Colter (Skip), Ian Juurlink, Robby McLean	(Nova Scotia) Stuart Thompson, Kendal Thompson, Colten Steele, Michael Brophy	$5,800
2022–2023	Not held		

=== Women ===
Year	Winner	Runner up	Purse (CDN)
2014	(Nova Scotia) Mary-Anne Arsenault, Christina Black, Jane Snyder, Jenn Baxter	(Nova Scotia) Mary Fay, Jennifer Smith, Karlee Burgess, Janique LeBlanc	$3,800
2015	(Nova Scotia) Theresa Breen, Tanya Hilliard, Jocelyn Adams, Amanda Simpson	(New Brunswick) Shannon Tatlock, Abby Burgess, Emily MacRae, Shelby Wilson	$5,170
2016	(Nova Scotia) Nancy McConnery, Jocelyn Nix, MacKenzie Proctor, Shelley Barker	(Nova Scotia) Jill Brothers, Erin Carmody, Blisse Joyce, Jenn Brine	$5,350
2017	(Nova Scotia) Julie McEvoy, Danielle Parsons, Sheena Moore, Jill Thomas	(Nova Scotia) Theresa Breen, Marlee Powers, Jocelyn Adams, Amanda Simpson	$5,350
2018	(Nova Scotia) Tanya Hilliard, Taylor Clarke, MacKenzie Proctor, Heather MacPhee	(Nova Scotia) Kim Kelly (Fourth), Colleen Jones (Skip), Mary Sue Radford, Julia Colter	$4,250
2019	(Nova Scotia) Mary-Anne Arsenault, Christina Black, Jenn Baxter, Emma Logan	(Nova Scotia) Jill Brothers, Erin Carmody, Sarah Murphy, Jenn Brine	$8,000
2020	(Nova Scotia) Christina Black, Jenn Baxter, Karlee Jones, Shelley Barker	(Prince Edward Island) Suzanne Birt, Marie Christianson, Meaghan Hughes, Michelle McQuaid	$5,350
2021	(Nova Scotia) Christina Black, Jenn Baxter, Karlee Jones, Shelley Barker	(New Brunswick) Andrea Crawford, Sylvie Quillian, Jillian Babin, Katie Forward	$5,800
2022	Not held		
2023	(Nova Scotia) Jessica Daigle, Mary Myketyn-Driscoll, Marlee Powers, Lindsey Burgess	(Nova Scotia) Christina Black, Jenn Baxter, Karlee Jones, Shelley Barker	$5,800

=== Open ===
Year	Winner	Runner up	Purse (CDN)
2004	(Nova Scotia) Scott Saunders	(Nova Scotia) Shawn Adams	$11,100
