= Travis Colter =

Canadian curler

- Curler
- Born: October 15, 1991 (age 35); Halifax, Nova Scotia

Team
- Curling club: Curl Moncton, Moncton
- Skip: Travis Colter
- Fourth: Jack Smeltzer
- Second: Chris Jeffrey
- Lead: Michael Donovan

Curling career
- Member Association: Nova Scotia (2010–2024); New Brunswick (2025–present)
- Brier: 1 (2019)
- Top CTRS ranking: 21st (2016–17)

Travis Colter (born October 15, 1991) is a Canadian curler from Dartmouth, Nova Scotia. He currently skips his own team out of Moncton, New Brunswick. He was a member of the 2019 Nova Scotia men's championship rink that competed at the 2019 Tim Hortons Brier, Canada's national men's curling championship.

== Career ==
=== Men's ===
Colter began curling at around 2007. By 2010, he had already joined up with former Brier champion Mark Dacey, playing lead on his team. He played in his first provincial championship at the 2011 Nova Scotia Men's Molson Provincial Championship. There, the team lost in the C qualifier final. The next season, they lost in the final of the 2012 Nova Scotia Men's Molson Provincial Championship to the Jamie Murphy rink. In 2012, Colter joined the Kevin Saccary rink, and joined the Tommy Sullivan rink in 2014. The Sullivan rink went 2–5 at the 2015 provincial championship.

In 2015, Colter joined the Stuart Thompson rink as the team's second. Team found immediate success on the World Curling Tour, winning two events in 2015, the Bud Light Men's Cashspiel and the Spitfire Arms Cash Spiel. The team played in the 2016 provincial championships, finishing fourth with a 4–3 record.

Team Thompson began the 2016–17 season by winning the Lakeshore Curling Club Cashspiel. Two months later, the team won the Challenge Casino de Charlevoix event. At the 2017 Deloitte Tankard provincial championship, the rink finished the round robin with a 5–2 record, which put the team into the playoffs. They won their semifinal match, but lost in the final to Jamie Murphy. At the 2018 Deloitte Tankard, they went 4–3 in the round robin, putting them in a three-way tiebreaker. They won both their tiebreak matches, but lost in the semifinal to Colter's former skip, Mark Dacey.

The Thompson rink began the 2018–19 season by winning the 2018 Curling Store Cashspiel tour event. Later that season, the team won the 2019 Deloitte Tankard in Dartmouth, Nova Scotia qualifying them for the 2019 Tim Hortons Brier in Brandon, Manitoba for the first time. At the Brier, as Team Nova Scotia, the team finished with a 3–4 record in pool play. The next season, Colter moved to play lead on the team. The team won a second straight Curling Store Cashspiel in 2019 At the 2020 Deloitte Tankard, the team finished the round robin with a 4–3 record, and then lost in a tiebreaker match to Chad Stevens.

Colter formed his own rink in 2020 as a skip, but throwing third stones with teammates Robby McLean, Ian Juurlink and Cameron MacKenzie. The team won their first event together, the 2020 Curling Store Cashspiel, the third straight title for Colter.

=== Mixed doubles ===
Colter and partner Julia Williams won the 2014 provincial mixed doubles curling championship. The pair represented Nova Scotia at the 2014 Canadian Mixed Doubles Curling Trials where they finished with a 1–6 record.

== Personal life ==
As of 2019, Colter was employed as a project quotation specialist for Graybar Canada. He is married.

== Teams ==
Season	Skip	Third	Second	Lead
2010–11	Mark Dacey	Tommy Sullivan	Travis Colter	Lee Buott
2011–12	Mark Dacey	Tommy Sullivan	Andrew Gibson	Travis Colter
2012–13	Kevin Saccary	Travis Colter	Kevin Lonergan	Donnie Smith
2013–14	Kevin Saccary	Travis Colter	Kevin Lonergan	Donnie Smith
2014–15	Tommy Sullivan	Paul Flemming	Travis Colter	Don McDermaid
2015–16	Stuart Thompson	Colten Steele	Travis Colter	Alex MacNeil
2016–17	Stuart Thompson	Colten Steele	Travis Colter	Billy MacPhee
2017–18	Stuart Thompson	Colten Steele	Travis Colter	Taylor Ardiel
2018–19	Stuart Thompson	Colten Steele	Travis Colter	Taylor Ardiel
2019–20	Stuart Thompson	Colten Steele	Cameron MacKenzie	Travis Colter
2020–21	Travis Colter	Cameron MacKenzie (Fourth)	Ian Juurlink	Robby McLean
2021–22	Travis Colter	Cameron MacKenzie (Fourth)	Ian Juurlink	Robby McLean
2022–23	Travis Colter	Cameron MacKenzie (Fourth)	Ian Juurlink	Robby McLean
2023–24	Stuart Thompson	Cameron MacKenzie	Travis Colter	Phil Crowell
2025–26	Travis Colter	Jack Smeltzer	Alex Peasley	Michael Donovan
2026–27	Jack Smeltzer (Fourth)	Travis Colter (Skip)	Chris Jeffrey	Michael Donovan
