= Mittelstadt =

Mittelstadt or Mittelstädt may refer to:

- Mittelstadt (Link to the German language Wikipedia) is a mid-sized town in Germany
- Casey Mittelstadt (born 1998), American ice hockey player
- Hanka Mittelstädt (born 1987), German politician
- Kelly Mittelstadt (born 1975), Canadian curler
- Maximilian Mittelstädt (born 1997), German footballer
