= 2010 Tim Hortons Brier =

2010 edition of the Canadian men's national curling championship

- Host city: Halifax, Nova Scotia
- Arena: Halifax Metro Centre
- Dates: March 6–14
- Attendance: 107,242
- Winner: Alberta
- Curling club: Saville SC, Edmonton
- Skip: Kevin Koe
- Third: Blake MacDonald
- Second: Carter Rycroft
- Lead: Nolan Thiessen
- Alternate: Jamie King
- Coach: John Dunn
- Finalist: Ontario (Glenn Howard)

The 2010 Tim Hortons Brier, the Canadian men's national curling championship, was held between March 6 until March 14, 2010 in Halifax, Nova Scotia at the Halifax Metro Centre. It marked the sixth time the Brier had been to Halifax, and the second time in eight years, having previously hosted the 2003 Nokia Brier.

The 2010 Brier was without its two-time defending champions, the Kevin Martin Alberta rink, which did not participate in playdowns, instead focusing on the 2010 Winter Olympics. Alberta was represented for the first time by the former Canada Cup champion, Kevin Koe. Koe's brother, Jamie skipped the Northwest Territories/Yukon team for the fourth time. The 2010 was the second Brier in a row where two brothers skipped different teams (2009 was Glenn Howard vs. Russ Howard.) Glenn Howard represented Ontario once again, having won a record fifth straight provincial championship. However his brother Russ did not compete in the playdowns for New Brunswick. That province was represented by Russ' former third, James Grattan. The 1996 and 1999 Brier champion Jeff Stoughton skipped for Manitoba for the eighth time, a record for that province. Former Olympic gold medalist Brad Gushue skipped for Newfoundland and Labrador for the seventh time in eight years.

Rounding out the field were Darrell McKee of Saskatchewan in his third Brier, Rod MacDonald who skipped Prince Edward Island for the third time, Brad Jacobs of Northern Ontario playing in his third Brier, Jeff Richard of British Columbia, Serge Reid of Quebec and Ian Fitzner-LeBlanc who all played their first Briers.

Kevin Koe's Alberta rink defeated Glenn Howard of Ontario in the final with a score of 6–5 to win the 2010 Tim Hortons Brier.

== Teams ==
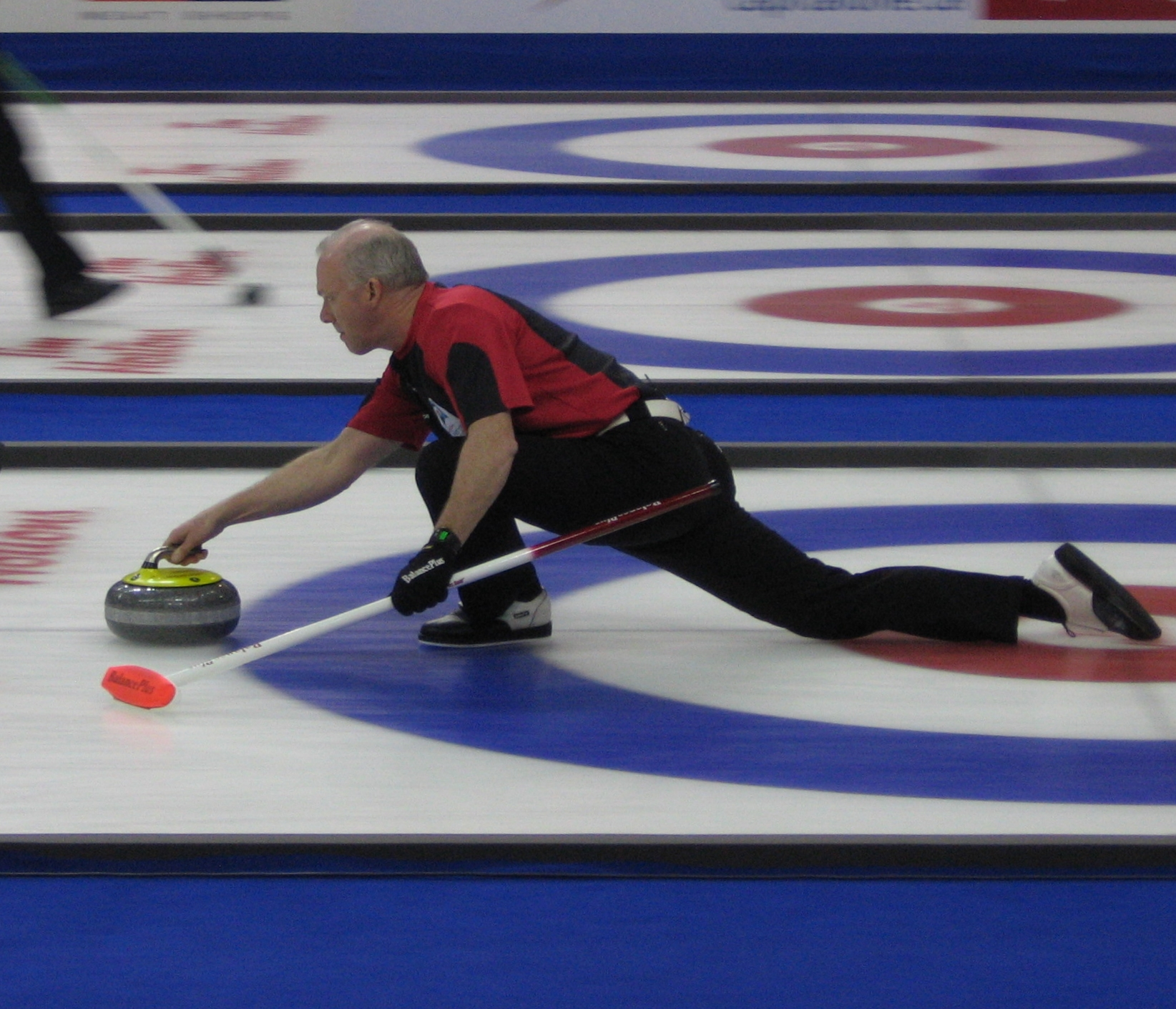
Glenn Howard at the 2010 Tim Hortons Brier

Alberta	British Columbia	Manitoba
Saville SC, Edmonton Skip: Kevin Koe; Third: Blake MacDonald; Second: Carter Rycroft; Lead: Nolan Thiessen; Alternate: Jamie King	Kelowna CC, Kelowna Skip: Jeff Richard; Third: Tom Shypitka; Second: Tyler Orme; Lead: Chris Anderson; Alternate: Kyle Anderson	Charleswood CC, Winnipeg Skip: Jeff Stoughton; Third: Kevin Park; Second: Rob Fowler; Lead: Steve Gould; Alternate: Randy Dutiaume
New Brunswick	Newfoundland and Labrador	Northern Ontario
Gage G&CC, Oromocto Skip: James Grattan; Third: Steve Howard; Second: Jason Vaughan; Lead: Peter Case; Alternate: Bobby Vaughan	Bally Haly G&CC, St. John's Skip: Brad Gushue; Third: Mark Nichols; Second: Ryan Fry; Lead: Jamie Korab; Alternate: Glenn Goss	Soo CA, Sault Ste. Marie Skip: Brad Jacobs; Third: E. J. Harnden; Second: Ryan Harnden; Lead: Caleb Flaxey; Alternate: Rob Thomas
Nova Scotia	Ontario	Prince Edward Island
Mayflower CC, Halifax Skip: Ian Fitzner-LeBlanc; Third: Stuart MacLean; Second: Kent Smith; Lead: Phil Crowell; Alternate: Mark Robar	Coldwater & District CC, Coldwater Skip: Glenn Howard; Third: Richard Hart; Second: Brent Laing; Lead: Craig Savill; Alternate: Steve Bice	Charlottetown CC, Charlottetown Skip: Rod MacDonald; Third: Kevin Champion; Second: Mark O'Rourke; Lead: Andrew Robinson; Alternate: Peter MacDonald
Quebec	Saskatchewan	Yukon/Northwest Territories
CC Kenogami, Jonquière Skip: Serge Reid; Third: François Gionest; Second: Simon Collin; Lead: Steeve Villeneuve; Alternate: Pierre Charette	Nutana CC, Saskatoon Skip: Darrell McKee; Third: Bruce Korte; Second: Roger Korte; Lead: Rob Markowsky; Alternate: Jason Jacobson	Yellowknife CC, Yellowknife Skip: Jamie Koe; Third: Kevin Whitehead; Second: Brad Chorostkowski; Lead: Martin Gavin; Alternate: Jon Solberg

== Map of teams ==
Provincial Winners

== Round-robin standings ==
Final round-robin standings

Key
Teams to Playoffs

Locale	Skip	W	L	PF	PA	EW	EL	BE	SE	S%
Ontario	Glenn Howard	11	0	90	45	50	35	8	15	88%
Northern Ontario	Brad Jacobs	9	2	80	54	49	39	6	17	84%
Alberta	Kevin Koe	8	3	81	62	45	42	9	11	85%
Newfoundland and Labrador	Brad Gushue	8	3	79	53	45	35	9	11	84%
Manitoba	Jeff Stoughton	7	4	71	58	45	41	9	12	83%
Quebec	Serge Reid	5	6	60	71	41	42	8	9	76%
Saskatchewan	Darrell McKee	4	7	70	79	44	44	5	7	80%
British Columbia	Jeff Richard	4	7	68	71	43	45	9	6	79%
New Brunswick	James Grattan	3	8	56	71	38	47	11	6	79%
Nova Scotia	Ian Fitzner-LeBlanc	3	8	62	90	38	54	2	5	76%
Prince Edward Island	Rod MacDonald	3	8	64	75	44	47	8	7	80%
Northwest Territories/Yukon	Jamie Koe	1	10	42	94	37	48	3	10	75%

== Round-robin results ==
All draw times are listed in Atlantic Standard Time (UTC−4).

=== Draw 1 ===
Saturday, March 6, 3:00 pm

Sheet A	1	2	3	4	5	6	7	8	9	10	11	Final
British Columbia (Richard) 🔨	1	0	2	0	1	2	0	0	0	1	0	7
Manitoba (Stoughton)	0	1	0	2	0	0	2	2	0	0	1	8

Sheet B	1	2	3	4	5	6	7	8	9	10	Final
New Brunswick (Grattan) 🔨	3	1	0	0	2	1	0	1	0	X	8
Nova Scotia (Fitzner-LeBlanc)	0	0	1	1	0	0	2	0	2	X	6

Sheet C	1	2	3	4	5	6	7	8	9	10	Final
Alberta (K. Koe) 🔨	2	0	0	1	0	2	2	0	2	X	9
Northern Ontario (Jacobs)	0	2	2	0	1	0	0	1	0	X	6

Sheet D	1	2	3	4	5	6	7	8	9	10	Final
Northwest Territories/Yukon (J. Koe)	0	0	1	0	2	1	0	1	0	X	5
Newfoundland and Labrador (Gushue) 🔨	0	3	0	1	0	0	1	0	3	X	8

=== Draw 2 ===
Saturday, March 6, 8:00 pm

Sheet A	1	2	3	4	5	6	7	8	9	10	Final
Northwest Territories/Yukon (J. Koe)	0	1	0	1	0	0	1	0	X	X	3
New Brunswick (Grattan) 🔨	3	0	1	0	2	1	0	3	X	X	10

Sheet B	1	2	3	4	5	6	7	8	9	10	Final
Quebec (Reid) 🔨	0	2	0	0	1	0	0	0	X	X	3
Ontario (Howard)	2	0	2	1	0	0	0	3	X	X	8

Sheet C	1	2	3	4	5	6	7	8	9	10	Final
Prince Edward Island (MacDonald) 🔨	1	0	1	0	1	0	1	0	1	1	6
Saskatchewan (McKee)	0	1	0	2	0	3	0	1	0	0	7

Sheet D	1	2	3	4	5	6	7	8	9	10	Final
Northern Ontario (Jacobs) 🔨	0	4	0	1	0	0	1	0	2	X	8
Manitoba (Stoughton)	0	0	1	0	1	1	0	2	0	X	5

=== Draw 3 ===
Sunday, March 7, 10:00 am

Sheet A	1	2	3	4	5	6	7	8	9	10	Final
Ontario (Howard) 🔨	1	0	2	1	1	1	0	1	2	X	9
Northern Ontario (Jacobs)	0	3	0	0	0	0	1	0	0	X	4

Sheet B	1	2	3	4	5	6	7	8	9	10	Final
Manitoba (Stoughton)	0	4	1	0	0	2	0	0	2	X	9
Prince Edward Island (MacDonald) 🔨	1	0	0	0	1	0	0	2	0	X	4

Sheet C	1	2	3	4	5	6	7	8	9	10	Final
Quebec (Reid) 🔨	1	1	1	2	2	0	0	0	X	X	7
Northwest Territories/Yukon (J. Koe)	0	0	0	0	0	1	1	1	X	X	3

Sheet D	1	2	3	4	5	6	7	8	9	10	Final
Saskatchewan (McKee)	0	1	0	0	1	0	1	1	0	3	7
New Brunswick (Grattan) 🔨	0	0	1	0	0	1	0	0	2	0	4

=== Draw 4 ===
Sunday, March 7, 3:00 pm

Sheet A	1	2	3	4	5	6	7	8	9	10	Final
Nova Scotia (Fitzner-LeBlanc)	0	2	0	2	1	0	1	0	1	0	7
Quebec (Reid) 🔨	1	0	1	0	0	2	0	2	0	2	8

Sheet B	1	2	3	4	5	6	7	8	9	10	Final
Newfoundland and Labrador (Gushue)	3	0	3	0	4	0	1	X	X	X	11
Saskatchewan (McKee) 🔨	0	1	0	3	0	1	0	X	X	X	5

Sheet C	1	2	3	4	5	6	7	8	9	10	Final
British Columbia (Richard) 🔨	1	0	1	0	1	0	2	0	1	0	6
Ontario (Howard)	0	1	0	2	0	2	0	1	0	1	7

Sheet D	1	2	3	4	5	6	7	8	9	10	Final
Prince Edward Island (MacDonald)	0	1	0	0	2	0	1	0	X	X	4
Alberta (K. Koe) 🔨	3	0	2	1	0	1	0	2	X	X	9

=== Draw 5 ===
Sunday, March 7, 8:00 pm

Sheet A	1	2	3	4	5	6	7	8	9	10	Final
Newfoundland and Labrador (Gushue)	0	1	0	2	0	1	1	0	1	X	6
Alberta (K. Koe) 🔨	2	0	0	0	2	0	0	3	0	X	7

Sheet B	1	2	3	4	5	6	7	8	9	10	Final
Northern Ontario (Jacobs) 🔨	0	1	0	1	0	2	0	2	3	X	9
Northwest Territories/Yukon (J. Koe)	1	0	1	0	1	0	2	0	0	X	5

Sheet C	1	2	3	4	5	6	7	8	9	10	Final
New Brunswick (Grattan) 🔨	0	0	1	0	2	0	0	1	0	X	4
Manitoba (Stoughton)	1	2	0	1	0	1	2	0	1	X	8

Sheet D	1	2	3	4	5	6	7	8	9	10	Final
Nova Scotia (Fitzner-LeBlanc)	0	0	0	1	0	2	0	2	0	X	5
British Columbia (Richard) 🔨	0	3	1	0	2	0	1	0	2	X	9

=== Draw 6 ===
Monday, March 8, 10:00 am

Sheet B	1	2	3	4	5	6	7	8	9	10	Final
British Columbia (Richard)	2	0	2	0	0	0	1	0	2	X	7
Alberta (K. Koe) 🔨	0	2	0	0	2	0	0	1	0	X	5

Sheet C	1	2	3	4	5	6	7	8	9	10	Final
Nova Scotia (Fitzner-LeBlanc)	0	1	0	2	0	0	0	X	X	X	3
Newfoundland and Labrador (Gushue) 🔨	2	0	2	0	2	1	3	X	X	X	10

=== Draw 7 ===
Monday, March 8, 3:00 pm

Sheet A	1	2	3	4	5	6	7	8	9	10	Final
Northern Ontario (Jacobs)	0	3	0	2	1	0	0	1	0	X	7
Saskatchewan (McKee) 🔨	1	0	2	0	0	2	0	0	1	X	6

Sheet B	1	2	3	4	5	6	7	8	9	10	Final
Ontario (Howard)	0	2	0	1	0	1	0	3	0	X	7
New Brunswick (Grattan) 🔨	1	0	0	0	1	0	1	0	1	X	4

Sheet C	1	2	3	4	5	6	7	8	9	10	Final
Northwest Territories/Yukon (J. Koe) 🔨	0	0	1	0	0	2	0	X	X	X	3
Prince Edward Island (MacDonald)	1	1	0	2	2	0	3	X	X	X	9

Sheet D	1	2	3	4	5	6	7	8	9	10	Final
Manitoba (Stoughton) 🔨	0	0	2	0	2	2	0	X	X	X	6
Quebec (Reid)	1	0	0	1	0	0	1	X	X	X	3

=== Draw 8 ===
Monday, March 8, 8:00 pm

Sheet A	1	2	3	4	5	6	7	8	9	10	Final
Ontario (Howard) 🔨	0	2	2	0	2	1	0	2	X	X	9
Nova Scotia (Fitzner-LeBlanc)	1	0	0	1	0	0	1	0	X	X	3

Sheet B	1	2	3	4	5	6	7	8	9	10	Final
Prince Edward Island (MacDonald)	0	1	0	0	1	0	1	0	0	X	3
Newfoundland and Labrador (Gushue) 🔨	1	0	0	1	0	2	0	2	1	X	7

Sheet C	1	2	3	4	5	6	7	8	9	10	Final
Quebec (Reid) 🔨	0	1	0	2	0	2	0	1	0	2	8
British Columbia (Richard)	0	0	2	0	1	0	2	0	2	0	7

Sheet D	1	2	3	4	5	6	7	8	9	10	Final
Alberta (K. Koe)	0	2	0	1	0	3	0	3	X	X	9
Saskatchewan (McKee) 🔨	2	0	1	0	1	0	1	0	X	X	5

=== Draw 9 ===
Tuesday, March 9, 10:00 am

Sheet A	1	2	3	4	5	6	7	8	9	10	Final
Northwest Territories/Yukon (J. Koe)	0	0	1	0	1	0	1	0	X	X	3
Manitoba (Stoughton) 🔨	2	1	0	2	0	1	0	4	X	X	10

Sheet B	1	2	3	4	5	6	7	8	9	10	Final
Saskatchewan (McKee) 🔨	1	0	0	0	1	0	0	X	X	X	2
Quebec (Reid)	0	2	1	0	0	2	5	X	X	X	10

Sheet C	1	2	3	4	5	6	7	8	9	10	Final
Northern Ontario (Jacobs) 🔨	0	2	0	3	0	1	0	1	X	X	7
New Brunswick (Grattan)	0	0	1	0	1	0	0	0	X	X	2

Sheet D	1	2	3	4	5	6	7	8	9	10	Final
Ontario (Howard) 🔨	3	2	2	0	0	1	0	X	X	X	8
Prince Edward Island (MacDonald)	0	0	0	0	1	0	1	X	X	X	2

=== Draw 10 ===
Tuesday, March 9, 3:00 pm

Sheet A	1	2	3	4	5	6	7	8	9	10	11	Final
Quebec (Reid) 🔨	1	0	2	0	1	0	1	0	2	0	1	8
Prince Edward Island (MacDonald)	0	1	0	3	0	0	0	1	0	2	0	7

Sheet B	1	2	3	4	5	6	7	8	9	10	Final
Alberta (K. Koe)	0	0	0	2	0	2	3	1	0	X	8
Nova Scotia (Fitzner-LeBlanc) 🔨	3	2	0	0	6	0	0	0	2	X	13

Sheet C	1	2	3	4	5	6	7	8	9	10	Final
Ontario (Howard)	0	2	3	0	1	0	0	3	X	X	9
Saskatchewan (McKee) 🔨	1	0	0	2	0	2	0	0	X	X	5

Sheet D	1	2	3	4	5	6	7	8	9	10	Final
British Columbia (Richard)	1	0	1	0	1	0	0	0	2	X	5
Newfoundland and Labrador (Gushue) 🔨	0	2	0	1	0	0	0	4	0	X	7

=== Draw 11 ===
Tuesday, March 9, 8:00 pm

Sheet A	1	2	3	4	5	6	7	8	9	10	Final
New Brunswick (Grattan) 🔨	0	0	2	0	0	0	1	0	X	X	3
Newfoundland and Labrador (Gushue)	0	1	0	1	5	0	0	1	X	X	8

Sheet B	1	2	3	4	5	6	7	8	9	10	Final
Northern Ontario (Jacobs) 🔨	1	0	2	1	1	0	0	1	1	X	7
British Columbia (Richard)	0	2	0	0	0	1	0	0	0	X	3

Sheet C	1	2	3	4	5	6	7	8	9	10	Final
Manitoba (Stoughton)	0	0	0	1	0	0	1	0	X	X	2
Alberta (K. Koe) 🔨	0	1	2	0	1	2	0	1	X	X	7

Sheet D	1	2	3	4	5	6	7	8	9	10	Final
Nova Scotia (Fitzner-LeBlanc) 🔨	0	1	0	0	0	0	1	0	X	X	2
Northwest Territories/Yukon (J. Koe)	1	0	1	1	1	1	0	2	X	X	7

=== Draw 12 ===
Wednesday, March 10, 10:00 am

Sheet A	1	2	3	4	5	6	7	8	9	10	Final
Saskatchewan (McKee) 🔨	2	1	2	0	2	0	X	X	X	X	7
British Columbia (Richard)	0	0	0	1	0	2	X	X	X	X	3

Sheet B	1	2	3	4	5	6	7	8	9	10	Final
Newfoundland and Labrador (Gushue) 🔨	0	1	0	2	0	1	0	1	0	X	5
Ontario (Howard)	0	0	1	0	3	0	3	0	2	X	9

Sheet C	1	2	3	4	5	6	7	8	9	10	Final
Prince Edward Island (MacDonald)	0	2	0	2	0	1	0	3	0	0	8
Nova Scotia (Fitzner-LeBlanc) 🔨	3	0	1	0	1	0	1	0	2	2	10

Sheet D	1	2	3	4	5	6	7	8	9	10	Final
Quebec (Reid) 🔨	1	0	0	1	0	2	0	0	1	1	6
Alberta (K. Koe)	0	2	1	0	1	0	1	2	0	0	7

=== Draw 13 ===
Wednesday, March 10, 3:00 pm

Sheet A	1	2	3	4	5	6	7	8	9	10	Final
Nova Scotia (Fitzner-LeBlanc)	0	0	0	0	1	0	1	X	X	X	2
Northern Ontario (Jacobs) 🔨	1	2	1	1	0	2	0	X	X	X	7

Sheet B	1	2	3	4	5	6	7	8	9	10	Final
New Brunswick (Grattan)	0	0	1	0	0	0	1	1	X	X	3
Alberta (K. Koe) 🔨	1	2	0	0	2	1	0	0	X	X	6

Sheet C	1	2	3	4	5	6	7	8	9	10	Final
British Columbia (Richard) 🔨	3	0	0	5	1	1	0	X	X	X	10
Northwest Territories/Yukon (J. Koe)	0	0	3	0	0	0	1	X	X	X	4

Sheet D	1	2	3	4	5	6	7	8	9	10	Final
Newfoundland and Labrador (Gushue) 🔨	2	0	0	1	1	0	0	1	0	X	5
Manitoba (Stoughton)	0	1	0	0	0	0	1	0	1	X	3

=== Draw 14 ===
Wednesday, March 10, 8:00 pm

Sheet A	1	2	3	4	5	6	7	8	9	10	Final
Manitoba (Stoughton)	0	1	1	1	0	1	0	X	X	X	4
Ontario (Howard) 🔨	4	0	0	0	2	0	2	X	X	X	8

Sheet B	1	2	3	4	5	6	7	8	9	10	Final
Northwest Territories/Yukon (J. Koe)	0	1	0	1	0	1	1	0	X	X	4
Saskatchewan (McKee) 🔨	4	0	3	0	1	0	0	5	X	X	13

Sheet C	1	2	3	4	5	6	7	8	9	10	Final
New Brunswick (Grattan) 🔨	4	0	0	2	0	1	0	X	X	X	7
Quebec (Reid)	0	0	1	0	0	0	1	X	X	X	2

Sheet D	1	2	3	4	5	6	7	8	9	10	Final
Prince Edward Island (MacDonald) 🔨	0	1	0	0	1	0	2	2	0	0	6
Northern Ontario (Jacobs)	1	0	1	1	0	2	0	0	0	2	7

=== Draw 15 ===
Thursday, March 11, 10:00 am

Sheet A	1	2	3	4	5	6	7	8	9	10	Final
Alberta (K. Koe) 🔨	3	0	0	2	0	2	0	1	X	X	8
Northwest Territories/Yukon (J. Koe)	0	1	1	0	1	0	0	0	X	X	3

Sheet B	1	2	3	4	5	6	7	8	9	10	Final
Nova Scotia (Fitzner-LeBlanc)	0	0	0	0	2	0	1	0	X	X	3
Manitoba (Stoughton) 🔨	1	0	2	1	0	3	0	2	X	X	9

Sheet C	1	2	3	4	5	6	7	8	9	10	Final
Newfoundland and Labrador (Gushue) 🔨	0	1	0	0	2	0	1	0	X	X	4
Northern Ontario (Jacobs)	1	0	1	1	0	3	0	2	X	X	8

Sheet D	1	2	3	4	5	6	7	8	9	10	11	Final
New Brunswick (Grattan)	0	2	0	1	0	1	0	0	2	1	0	7
British Columbia (Richard) 🔨	2	0	1	0	2	0	2	0	0	0	1	8

=== Draw 16 ===
Thursday, March 11, 3:00 pm

Sheet A	1	2	3	4	5	6	7	8	9	10	Final
Prince Edward Island (MacDonald) 🔨	1	1	0	2	0	1	2	0	2	X	9
New Brunswick (Grattan)	0	0	1	0	2	0	0	1	0	X	4

Sheet B	1	2	3	4	5	6	7	8	9	10	Final
Quebec (Reid) 🔨	0	1	0	0	0	2	0	X	X	X	3
Northern Ontario (Jacobs)	1	0	3	2	1	0	2	X	X	X	9

Sheet C	1	2	3	4	5	6	7	8	9	10	11	Final
Saskatchewan (McKee) 🔨	1	1	0	0	1	0	1	1	0	1	0	6
Manitoba (Stoughton)	0	0	0	2	0	1	0	0	3	0	1	7

Sheet D	1	2	3	4	5	6	7	8	9	10	Final
Northwest Territories/Yukon (J. Koe) 🔨	1	0	0	0	1	0	1	0	X	X	3
Ontario (Howard)	0	1	1	1	0	2	0	4	X	X	9

=== Draw 17 ===
Thursday, March 11, 8:00 pm

Sheet A	1	2	3	4	5	6	7	8	9	10	Final
Newfoundland and Labrador (Gushue) 🔨	2	0	3	1	2	0	0	X	X	X	8
Quebec (Reid)	0	1	0	0	0	0	1	X	X	X	2

Sheet B	1	2	3	4	5	6	7	8	9	10	Final
British Columbia (Richard)	0	0	1	0	0	1	0	1	0	X	3
Prince Edward Island (MacDonald) 🔨	1	0	0	0	2	0	1	0	2	X	6

Sheet C	1	2	3	4	5	6	7	8	9	10	Final
Alberta (K. Koe)	0	0	3	0	1	0	0	0	2	0	6
Ontario (Howard) 🔨	0	2	0	2	0	1	0	1	0	1	7

Sheet D	1	2	3	4	5	6	7	8	9	10	Final
Saskatchewan (McKee)	0	1	0	1	0	2	0	2	1	0	7
Nova Scotia (Fitzner-LeBlanc) 🔨	1	0	2	0	1	0	2	0	0	2	8

== Playoffs ==
Page playoff system
1	Ontario	8
2	Northern Ontario	6
3	Alberta	6
4	Newfoundland and Labrador	5

Semifinal
2	Northern Ontario	3
3	Alberta	10

Final
1	Ontario	5
3	Alberta	6

=== 1 vs. 2 ===
Friday, March 12, 8:00 pm

Sheet B	1	2	3	4	5	6	7	8	9	10	Final
Ontario (Howard) 🔨	0	2	0	0	1	0	0	3	0	2	8
Northern Ontario (Jacobs)	0	0	3	1	0	1	0	0	1	0	6

Player percentages
Ontario		Northern Ontario	
Craig Savill	99%	Caleb Flaxey	94%
Brent Laing	91%	Ryan Harnden	84%
Richard Hart	88%	E. J. Harnden	75%
Glenn Howard	79%	Brad Jacobs	73%
Total	89%	Total	81%

=== 3 vs. 4 ===
Saturday, March 13, 11:00 am

Sheet B	1	2	3	4	5	6	7	8	9	10	Final
Alberta (K. Koe) 🔨	2	0	2	0	0	0	0	1	0	1	6
Newfoundland and Labrador (Gushue)	0	1	0	0	0	1	1	0	2	0	5

Player percentages
Alberta		Newfoundland and Labrador	
Nolan Thiessen	81%	Jamie Korab	95%
Carter Rycroft	99%	Ryan Fry	88%
Blake MacDonald	88%	Mark Nichols	84%
Kevin Koe	81%	Brad Gushue	88%
Total	87%	Total	88%

=== Semifinal ===
Saturday, March 13, 8:00 pm

Sheet B	1	2	3	4	5	6	7	8	9	10	Final
Northern Ontario (Jacobs) 🔨	0	0	0	2	0	1	0	0	X	X	3
Alberta (K. Koe)	2	0	2	0	3	0	2	1	X	X	10

Player percentages
Northern Ontario		Alberta	
Caleb Flaxey	84%	Nolan Thiessen	83%
Ryan Harnden	81%	Carter Rycroft	86%
E. J. Harnden	84%	Blake MacDonald	94%
Brad Jacobs	61%	Kevin Koe	92%
Total	78%	Total	89%

=== Final ===
Sunday, March 14, 8:00 pm

Sheet B	1	2	3	4	5	6	7	8	9	10	11	Final
Ontario (Howard) 🔨	2	0	0	0	1	0	0	1	0	1	0	5
Alberta (K. Koe)	0	0	1	0	0	3	0	0	1	0	1	6

Player percentages
Ontario		Alberta	
Craig Savill	97%	Nolan Thiessen	88%
Brent Laing	90%	Carter Rycroft	84%
Richard Hart	83%	Blake MacDonald	91%
Glenn Howard	89%	Kevin Koe	86%
Total	89%	Total	87%

== Provincial and territorial playdowns ==
- 2010 Boston Pizza Cup (Alberta)
- (British Columbia) 2010 Canadian Direct Insurance BC Men's Curling Championship
- 2010 Safeway Championship (Manitoba)
- (New Brunswick) 2010 Alexander Keith's Tankard
- 2010 Newfoundland and Labrador Tankard
- The Dominion 2010 Northern Ontario Men's Curling Championship
- 2010 Nova Scotia Men's Molson Provincial Championship
- 2010 Ontario Men's Curling Championship (Ontario)
- (Prince Edward Island) 2010 PEI Labatt Tankard
- 2010 Quebec Men's Provincial Curling Championship
- 2010 SaskTel Tankard (Saskatchewan)
- (Northwest Territories) 2010 Yukon/NWT Men's Curling Championship

=== Top 5 player percentages ===
Round Robin only

Leads	%
(Alberta) Nolan Thiessen	89
(Ontario) Craig Savill	88
(Manitoba) Steve Gould	88
(Prince Edward Island) Andrew Robinson	88
(Newfoundland and Labrador) Jamie Korab	86

Seconds	%
(Ontario) Brent Laing	88
(Alberta) Carter Rycroft	86
(Newfoundland and Labrador) Ryan Fry	85
(Northern Ontario) Ryan Harnden	85
(Manitoba) Rob Fowler	84

Thirds	%
(Ontario) Richard Hart	88
(Northern Ontario) E. J. Harnden	85
(Alberta) Blake MacDonald	84
(Manitoba) Kevin Park	84
(Newfoundland and Labrador) Mark Nichols	82

Skips	%
(Ontario) Glenn Howard	88
(Newfoundland and Labrador) Brad Gushue	83
(Alberta) Kevin Koe	82
(Northern Ontario) Brad Jacobs	81
(British Columbia) Jeff Richard	78

== Awards and honours ==
All-Star Teams

First Team

- Skip: Glenn Howard (Ontario)
- Third: Richard Hart (Ontario)
- Second: Brent Laing (Ontario)
- Lead: Nolan Thiessen (Alberta)

Second Team

- Skip: Brad Gushue (Newfoundland and Labrador)
- Third: E.J Harnden (Northern Ontario)
- Second: Carter Rycroft (Alberta)
- Lead: Craig Savill (Ontario)

Hec Gervais Most Valuable Player Award

- Kevin Koe (Alberta)

Ross Harstone Award

- Ian Fitzner-LeBlanc (Nova Scotia)
