= Bridgewater Curling Club =

Curling club in Bridgewater, Nova Scotia

- Location: 90 Dominion St; Bridgewater, Nova Scotia, Canada

Information
- Established: 1907
- Club type: Dedicated Ice
- Curling Canada region: NSCA
- Sheets of ice: 4
- Rock colours: Blue and Yellow
- Website: bridgewatercurlingclub.com

Curl Bridgewater, better known as the Bridgewater Curling Club is a curling club and facility in Bridgewater, Nova Scotia.

== History ==
The club was founded in 1907, and female curlers were permitted to join in 1910.

== Provincial champions ==
=== Men's ===
Teams from the Bridgewater Curling Club have won the Nova Scotia Men's Championship nine times, earning the right to represent Nova Scotia at the Brier, Canada's national men's championship.

Year	Team	Brier record
1940	Stanley Rafuse Irving Hebb, Warner Bickle, Frank Cook	1–8
1942	Irving Hebb, Norman Rafuse, Warner Bickle, Frank Cook	1–8
1950	Bernard Haines, Eric Joudry, Ralph Simmons, Lee Rhodenizer	4–5
1953	Bernard Haines, Ralph Simmons, Pennell Richardson, Lee Rhodenizer	5–5
1957	Ralph Simmons, Pennell Richardson, Robert Rafuse, Lee Rhodenizer	3–7
1996	Brian Rafuse, Curt Palmer, David Slauenwhite, Glenn Josephson	5–6
2000	Shawn Adams, Jeff Hopkins, Ben Blanchard, Jason Blanchard	3–8
2002	Shawn Adams, Craig Burgess, Jeff Hopkins, Ben Blanchard	6–5
2008	Brian Rafuse, Curt Palmer, Alan Darragh, David Slauenwhite	3–8

=== Mixed ===
Teams from the Bridgewater Curling Club have won the provincial mixed championship three times, earning the right to represent Nova Scotia at the Canadian Mixed Curling Championship.

Year	Team	Canadian Mixed record
1976	Brian Rafuse, Faye Corkum, Glenn Josephson, Charmaine Murray	6–5
1989	Brian Rafuse, Fay Grace, Glenn Josephson, Cathy MacDonald	6–5
2005	Brian Rafuse, Laura Fultz, David Slauenwhite, Alexis Sinclair	5–6

=== Junior men's ===
Teams from the Bridgewater Curling Club have won the provincial men's junior championships 10 times, earning the right to represent Nova Scotia at the Canadian Junior Curling Championships. The 1993 champion team, skipped by Shawn Adams won the Canadian juniors that year, but could not represent Canada at the 1993 World Junior Championships due to alcohol violations.

Year	Team	Canadian Juniors record
1959	(Bridgewater HS) Wayne Rhodenizer, Sheldon Wambolt, George Hall, Kelvin Ogilvie	3–7
1962	Dick Rafuse, Barrie Simmons, John Drummond, Loran Seamone	5–5
1963	Dick Rafuse, Loran Seamone, Doug Harrington, John Reid	7–3
1965	Stuart Campbell, Loran Seamone, Bob Feindel, Brian Gibson	7–3
1967	Charles Rafuse, Richard Gow, Gary Rhodenizer, John Brady	7–3
1969	John Brady, Charles O'Neil, Chris Jones, Jim Richardson	4–6
1980	John Harlow, Bruce Saunders, Dwight Whynot, John Linehan	3–8
1986	Jeff Hopkins, Gordon Hopkins, Graham Hopkins, David Craft	4–7
1992	Shawn Adams, Ben Blanchard, Blake Brown, Robert MacArthur	9–4
1993	Shawn Adams, Ben Blanchard, Jon Philip, Robert MacArthur	9–4

=== Junior women's ===
Teams from the Bridgewater Curling Club have won the provincial women's junior championships once, earning the right to represent Nova Scotia at the Canadian Junior Curling Championships.

Year	Team	Canadian Juniors record
2010	Tara LeGay, Jane Snyder, Leah Squarey, Laura Murray	4–8

=== Senior men's ===
Teams from the Bridgewater Curling Club have won the provincial senior men's championship three times, earning the right to represent Nova Scotia at the Canadian Senior Curling Championships.

Year	Team	Canadian Seniors record
2007	Brian Rafuse, David Slauenwhite, Alan Darragh, Glenn Josephson	7–4
2008	Brian Rafuse, Curt Palmer, Alan Darragh, David Slauenwhite	9–3
2025	Alan O'Leary, Curt Palmer, Danny Christianson, Glenn Josephson, Steve Johnston	2–6

=== Senior women's ===
Teams from the Bridgewater Curling Club have won the provincial senior women's championship once, in 1970 prior to the creation of the women's Canadian Senior Curling Championship. The team consisted of Pauline Oickle, Esther Bond, Kate Turple and Gladys Conrad.

=== Men's Curling Club championships ===
Teams from the Bridgewater Curling Club have won the men's provincial curling club championships twice, earning the right to represent Nova Scotia at the Canadian Curling Club Championships. The 2021 championship team, skipped by Nick Deagle won the national championships as well.

Year	Team	Canadian Club Championships record
2017	Nick Deagle, Jason van Vonderen, Robert Phillips, Ryan Sperry	4–3
2021	Nick Deagle, Jason van Vonderen, Robert Phillips, Ryan Sperry	(gold) 7–4
