= Stuart Thompson (curler) =

Canadian curler (born 1992)

- Curler
- Born: September 26, 1992 (age 34); Halifax, Nova Scotia

Team
- Curling club: Dartmouth CC, Dartmouth, NS
- Skip: Kendal Thompson
- Third: Stuart Thompson
- Second: Bryce Everist
- Lead: Michael Brophy

Curling career
- Member Association: Nova Scotia
- Brier: 2 (2019, 2026)
- Top CTRS ranking: 21st (2016–17)

Stuart Thompson (born September 26, 1992, in Halifax, Nova Scotia) is a Canadian curler. He currently plays third on Team Kendal Thompson.

== Career ==
=== Juniors ===
As a junior curler, Thompson won three Nova Scotia provincial titles. The first came in 2011, playing second for his brother Kendal's team. The team represented Nova Scotia at the 2011 Canadian Junior Curling Championships, where the team would just miss the playoffs, finishing with a 7–5 record. With the elder Kendal graduating from the junior ranks, Stuart formed his own junior team for the next season with himself skipping, teammates Scott Babin, Alex MacNeil and Paul Weingartshofer. The team won the 2012 provincial junior title and represented Nova Scotia at the 2012 Canadian Junior Curling Championships. Thompson led his rink to a 9–3 round robin record, tied for third with Manitoba. This put the team in a tiebreaker game for the final playoff spot, which they would lose. For the next season, Thompson continued as skip for his team, adding Luke Saunders to the rink, replacing Weingartshofer. The team would win the 2013 provincial junior championship and again represented Nova Scotia at that year's Canadian Juniors. There, the team finished with an 8–2 round robin record, good enough for second place. However, the team would lose in the semifinal against Manitoba's Matt Dunstone, settling for a bronze medal.

Thompson also played with his brother on the Saint Mary's University curling team. The team would finish with a 3–4 record at the 2011 CIS/CCA Curling Championships.

=== Men's ===
After juniors, Thompson was picked up to play third for former Brier champion Mark Dacey. With Dacey, Thompson would play in his first provincial men's championship at the 2014 Molson Coors Tankard. There, Dacey led the team all the way to the final, losing to Jamie Murphy. The next month the team played in Thompson's first ever Grand Slam event, the 2014 Syncrude National, with the team going 2–3, failing to advance to the playoffs.

The next season, the team won the 2014 Atlantic Curling Tour Championship, Thompson's first World Curling Tour event title. Later in the season, the team again played in the Nova Scotia men's championship, the 2015 Clearwater Men's Provincial Championship. The team had less luck, placing fourth. After the season, Thompson left the Dacey rink to form his own team as skip, with teammates Colten Steele, Travis Colter, and Alex MacNeil.

Thompson and his new team found success on the World Curling Tour, winning two events in 2015, the Bud Light Men's Cashspiel and the Spitfire Arms Cash Spiel. The team played in the 2016 provincial championships, finishing fourth with a 4–3 record.

Thompson began the 2016–17 season by winning the Lakeshore Curling Club Cashspiel. Two months later, his team won the Challenge Casino de Charlevoix event. At the 2017 Deloitte Tankard provincial championship, he led his team to a 5–2 round robin record, which put the rink into the playoffs. They won their semifinal match, but lost in the final to Jamie Murphy. The next season, Taylor Ardiel joined the lineup, replacing MacNeil at lead. At the 2018 Deloitte Tankard, they went 4–3 in the round robin, putting them in a three-way tiebreaker. They won both their tiebreak matches, but lost in the semifinal to Team Mark Dacey.

Thompson began the 2018–19 season by winning The Curling Store Cashspiel tour event. At the 2019 Deloitte Tankard, Thompson had gone 5–2 in the round robin, and beat Team Murphy 6–4 to win his first provincial men's title, qualifying the team to represent Nova Scotia at the 2019 Tim Hortons Brier in Brandon, Manitoba. At the Brier, Thompson led Team Nova Scotia to a 3–4 record in pool play. The team started the following season by winning a second straight Curling Store Cashspiel. Looking to win their second straight provincial title at the 2020 Deloitte Tankard, the team finished the round robin with a 4–3 record, and then lost in a tiebreaker match to Chad Stevens.

Thompson would later join as the third on a team skipped by brother Kendal Thompson, alongside Bryce Everist and Michael Brophy. Thompson would win his second provincial title at the 2026 Ocean Contractors Men's Curling Championship, beating Owen Purcell 9–7 in the final and earning the right to represent Nova Scotia at the 2026 Montana's Brier. There, they would finish the round robin with a 2–6 record, finishing 15th.

== Personal life ==
Thompson works as a mechanical technologist with Geospectrum Technologies Inc.
