= Philip Crowell =

Canadian curler

- Curler
- Born: March 26, 1978 (age 48); Truro, Nova Scotia

Team
- Curling club: Halifax CC, Halifax, NS
- Skip: Stuart Thompson
- Third: Cameron MacKenzie
- Second: Travis Colter
- Lead: Phil Crowell

Curling career
- Member Association: Nova Scotia
- Brier: 7 (2010, 2016, 2017, 2018, 2020, 2021, 2022)
- Top CTRS ranking: 18th (2015–16; 2019-20, 2021–22)

Philip "Phil" Crowell (born March 26, 1978, in Truro, Nova Scotia) is a Canadian curler from Dartmouth, Nova Scotia. He currently plays lead on Team Stuart Thompson.

== Career ==
Crowell won his first Deloitte Tankard in 2010 with Ian Fitzner-LeBlanc. They went 3–8 at the 2010 Tim Hortons Brier. He won the provincial championship again in 2016 with Jamie Murphy. They failed to get out of the pre-qualifying tournament after losing the final to Northwest Territories' Jamie Koe. The team returned the following season after winning the Nova Scotia provincials once again and finished 4–7 in the main event. The team won their third consecutive Deloitte Tankard in 2018 and finished 5–6 at the 2018 Tim Hortons Brier. Also during the 2017–18 season, the team played in the 2017 Canadian Olympic Curling Trials Pre-Trials, losing the tiebreaker to Jason Gunnlaugson.

Team Murphy played in their first Grand Slam of Curling event the following season at the 2018 Masters. At the event, they defeated higher ranked Glenn Howard and Steffen Walstad to qualify for the tiebreakers. They defeated Reid Carruthers in the first round of tiebreakers before losing to Matt Dunstone in the second. They could not defend their title at the 2019 Deloitte Tankard, losing the final to the Stuart Thompson rink.

Team Murphy played in another Grand Slam the following season at the 2019 Tour Challenge Tier 2 event. There, they qualified for the tiebreakers with a 2–2 record. They beat Chad Stevens in the tiebreaker before losing to Michael Fournier in the quarterfinals. The team won the 2020 Deloitte Tankard in mid-January, 2020, and finished 3–4 at the 2020 Tim Hortons Brier.

Due to the COVID-19 pandemic in Nova Scotia, the 2021 provincial championship was cancelled. As the reigning provincial champions, Team Murphy was invited to represent Nova Scotia at the 2021 Tim Hortons Brier, which they accepted. Jamie Murphy opted not to attend the event due to travel restrictions. He was replaced by Scott McDonald of Ontario. At the Brier, they finished with a 4–4 record, failing to qualify for the championship pool.

== Personal life ==
Crowell works as a team lead for the Nova Scotia Health Authority. He is married to Stephanie Crowell and has two children, Nathan and Ryan. He attended the Nova Scotia Community College and the South Colchester Academy.

== Teams ==
Season	Skip	Third	Second	Lead
2006–07	Ian Fitzner-LeBlanc	Chris MacDonah	Kent Smith	Phil Crowell
2009–10	Ian Fitzner-LeBlanc	Stuart MacLean	Kent Smith	Phil Crowell
2010–11	Ian Fitzner-LeBlanc	Stuart MacLean	Kent Smith	Phil Crowell
2011–12	Kent Smith	Stuart MacLean	Mark Robar	Phil Crowell
2012–13	Doug MacKenzie (Fourth)	Chad Stevens	Scott Saccary	Phil Crowell
2013–14	Chad Stevens	Cameron MacKenzie	Scott Saccary	Phil Crowell
2014–15	Chad Stevens	Cameron MacKenzie	Scott Saccary	Phil Crowell
2015–16	Jamie Murphy	Jordan Pinder	Scott Saccary	Phil Crowell
2016–17	Jamie Murphy	Jordan Pinder	Scott Saccary	Phil Crowell
2017–18	Jamie Murphy	Paul Flemming	Scott Saccary	Phil Crowell
2018–19	Jamie Murphy	Paul Flemming	Scott Saccary	Phil Crowell
2019–20	Jamie Murphy	Paul Flemming	Scott Saccary	Phil Crowell
2020–21	Jamie Murphy	Paul Flemming	Scott Saccary	Phil Crowell
2021–22	Paul Flemming	Scott Saccary	Ryan Abraham	Phil Crowell
2022–23	Paul Flemming	Scott Saccary	Ryan Abraham	Phil Crowell
2023–24	Stuart Thompson	Cameron MacKenzie	Travis Colter	Phil Crowell
