= Alan O'Leary =

Canadian curler

Medal record

Curling

World Senior Curling Championships
Silver medal – second place	2015 Sochi	

Alan O'Leary (born February 4, 1962, in Winnipeg, Manitoba) is a Canadian curler from Dartmouth, Nova Scotia.

O'Leary won a provincial junior title in 1981 and represented Nova Scotia at the 1981 Canadian Junior Curling Championships. There, he led his team of Paul Dykeman, David Young and Scott Sutherland to a 5–6 record.

O'Leary has won two provincial championships as a skip winning in 1993 and 1994. He and his team of Bob LeClair, Steve Johnston and Steve Piggott represented Nova Scotia at the 1993 Labatt Brier, where he O'Leary led his team to a 2–9 record, in last place. The next season, Jim Walsh joined the team, replacing LeClair. At the 1994 Labatt Brier, the team improved their record to 3-8.

O'Leary has won four provincial senior men's titles, in 2013, 2014, 2016, 2017 and 2018. He and his rink of Andy Dauphinee, Danny Christianson and Harold McCarthy represented Nova Scotia at the 2013 Canadian Senior Curling Championships, where they just missed the playoffs with a 6–5 record. They again represented Nova Scotia at the 2014 Canadian Senior Curling Championships, where they topped the round robin table with a 9–2 record, giving them a bye to the final, where they beat Manitoba's Kelly Robertson rink to claim the championship. The team would then go on to represent Canada at the 2015 World Senior Curling Championships, where they went undefeated in the group stage (7-0), and then won two playoff games before losing to the United States (skipped by Lyle Sieg) in the final.

The team returned to the Canadian Seniors in 2016. The team finished with a 7–3 record before the playoffs where they lost to Manitoba's Randy Neufeld rink in the semifinal. The next season, Stuart MacLean joined the rink, replacing Dauphinee. At the 2017 Canadian Senior Curling Championships, the team would not make the championship round, and finished with a 6–3 record.
