= Scott Saccary =

Canadian curler

- Curler
- Born: March 26, 1985 (age 41); Halifax, Nova Scotia

Team
- Curling club: Halifax CC, Halifax, NS

Curling career
- Member Association: Nova Scotia (2002–2025); Newfoundland and Labrador (2025–2026)
- Brier: 7 (2016, 2017, 2018, 2020, 2021, 2022, 2025)
- Top CTRS ranking: 13th (2023–24)

Scott Saccary (born March 26, 1985, in Halifax, Nova Scotia) is a Canadian curler from Dartmouth, Nova Scotia.

== Career ==
Saccary represented Nova Scotia at the Canadian Junior Curling Championships in 2002 and 2003 finishing 5–7 in 2002 and 6–6 in 2003.

Saccary won his first Deloitte Tankard in 2016 with Jamie Murphy. They failed to get out of the pre-qualifying tournament after losing the final to Northwest Territories' Jamie Koe. The team returned the following season after winning the Nova Scotia provincials once again and finished 4–7 in the main event. The team won their third consecutive Deloitte Tankard in 2018 and finished 5–6 at the 2018 Tim Hortons Brier. Also during the 2017–18 season, the team played in the 2017 Canadian Olympic Curling Trials Pre-Trials, losing the tiebreaker to Jason Gunnlaugson.

Team Murphy played in their first Grand Slam of Curling event the following season at the 2018 Masters. At the event, they defeated higher ranked Glenn Howard and Steffen Walstad to qualify for the tiebreakers. They defeated Reid Carruthers in the first round of tiebreakers before losing to Matt Dunstone in the second. They could not defend their title at the 2019 Deloitte Tankard, losing the final to the Stuart Thompson rink.

Team Murphy played in another Grand Slam the following season at the 2019 Tour Challenge Tier 2 event. There, they qualified for the tiebreakers with a 2–2 record. They beat Chad Stevens in the tiebreaker before losing to Michael Fournier in the quarterfinals. The team won the 2020 Deloitte Tankard in mid-January, 2020, and finished 3–4 at the 2020 Tim Hortons Brier.

Due to the COVID-19 pandemic in Nova Scotia, the 2021 provincial championship was cancelled. As the reigning provincial champions, Team Murphy was invited to represent Nova Scotia at the 2021 Tim Hortons Brier, which they accepted. Jamie Murphy opted not to attend the event due to travel restrictions. He was replaced by Scott McDonald of Ontario. At the Brier, they finished with a 4–4 record, failing to qualify for the championship pool.

Saccary would curl with Owen Purcell starting in 2023–24, where in their first year together, would have a strong season on tour, finishing 13th on the CTRS rankings, and participating in the 2023 National Grand Slam of Curling event. At The National, the team would finish 1–3, failing to reach the playoffs. The following season, Team Purcell would win the 2025 Nova Scotia Tankard, qualifying for the 2025 Montana's Brier. At the Brier, the team would finish the round robin with a 5–3 record, qualifying for the playoffs. It was the first time Nova Scotia made the playoffs since 2006. However, Purcell would then lose to Brad Jacobs 10–6 in the Page 3/4 qualifying game. At the end of the season, the team announced that it would be parting ways with Saccary. Saccary would later announce that he would be joining Greg Smith's rink out of Newfoundland.

== Personal life ==
Saccary owns the New Scotland Clothing Co. & New Scotland Brewing Co. He is married to Gerri d’Entremont.

== Teams ==
Season	Skip	Third	Second	Lead
2001–02	Kevin Saccary	Corey Shortliffe	Scott Saccary	Donald Brooks
2002–03	Kevin Saccary	Scott Saccary	Jared Bent	Luke Johnson
2006–07	Kevin Saccary	Scott Saccary	Kevin Lonergan	Andrew McManus
2007–08	Kevin Kehoe	Kevin Saccary	Scott Saccary	Donnie Smith
2009–10	Chad Stevens	Graham Breckon	Scott Saccary	Kevin Saccary
2010–11	Chad Stevens	Graham Breckon	Scott Saccary	Kevin Saccary
2011–12	Chad Stevens	Graham Breckon	Scott Saccary	Kevin Saccary
2012–13	Doug MacKenzie (Fourth)	Chad Stevens	Scott Saccary	Phil Crowell
2013–14	Chad Stevens	Cameron MacKenzie	Scott Saccary	Phil Crowell
2014–15	Chad Stevens	Cameron MacKenzie	Scott Saccary	Phil Crowell
2015–16	Jamie Murphy	Jordan Pinder	Scott Saccary	Phil Crowell
2016–17	Jamie Murphy	Jordan Pinder	Scott Saccary	Phil Crowell
2017–18	Jamie Murphy	Paul Flemming	Scott Saccary	Phil Crowell
2018–19	Jamie Murphy	Paul Flemming	Scott Saccary	Phil Crowell
2019–20	Jamie Murphy	Paul Flemming	Scott Saccary	Phil Crowell
2020–21	Jamie Murphy	Paul Flemming	Scott Saccary	Phil Crowell
2021–22	Paul Flemming	Scott Saccary	Ryan Abraham	Phil Crowell
2022–23	Paul Flemming	Scott Saccary	Ryan Abraham	Phil Crowell
2023–24	Owen Purcell	Ryan Abraham	Scott Saccary	Adam McEachren
2024–25	Owen Purcell	Luke Saunders	Scott Saccary	Ryan Abraham
2025–26	Greg Smith	Carter Small	Scott Saccary	Sean O'Leary
