= Jamie Murphy (curler) =

Canadian curler

- Curler
- Born: April 13, 1981 (age 45); Saint John, New Brunswick

Team
- Curling club: Halifax CC, Halifax, NS

Curling career
- Member Association: Nova Scotia
- Brier: 6 (2012, 2014, 2016, 2017, 2018, 2020)
- Top CTRS ranking: 18th (2015–16; 2019-20)

Jamie Murphy (born 13 April 1981 in Saint John, New Brunswick) is a Canadian curler from Dartmouth, Nova Scotia. He is a former skip, and played at his first Brier in 2012.

== Career ==
Jamie Murphy, originally from Quispamsis, is a former junior curler, representing New Brunswick at the Canadian Junior Championships in 2001 and 2002.

Murphy's team had a notable 2010 season, losing in the semifinal of the Nova Scotia Men's Provincial Championship that year.

In 2012 the team captured their provincial championship, defeating former Brier champion Mark Dacey. This earned Murphy's team their first trip to the Brier.

== Teams ==
Season	Skip	Third	Second	Lead	Events
2009–10	Jamie Murphy	Jordan Pinder	Jon Wamback	Don McDermaid	2010 NS
2010–11	Jamie Murphy	Jordan Pinder	Kris Granchelli	Don McDermaid	2011 NS
2011–12	Jamie Murphy	Jordan Pinder	Mike Bardsley	Don McDermaid	2012 NS, Brier
2012–13	Jamie Murphy	Jordan Pinder	Mike Bardsley	Don McDermaid	2013 NS
2013–14	Jamie Murphy	Jordan Pinder	Mike Bardsley	Don McDermaid	2014 NS, Brier
2014–15	Jamie Murphy	Jordan Pinder	Scott Babin	Tyler Gamble	2015 NS
2015–16	Jamie Murphy	Jordan Pinder	Scott Saccary	Phil Crowell	2016 NS, Brier
2016–17	Jamie Murphy	Jordan Pinder	Scott Saccary	Phil Crowell	2017 NS, Brier
2017–18	Jamie Murphy	Paul Flemming	Scott Saccary	Phil Crowell	2018 NS, Brier
2018–19	Jamie Murphy	Paul Flemming	Scott Saccary	Phil Crowell	2019 NS
2019–20	Jamie Murphy	Paul Flemming	Scott Saccary	Phil Crowell	2020 NS, Brier
2020–21	Jamie Murphy	Paul Flemming	Scott Saccary	Phil Crowell	

== Personal life ==
Murphy's sister, Jeanette Murphy, is also a successful curler, listed as an alternate with Andrea Kelly's New Brunswick women's championship winning team. He works as a general manager with ADESA Halifax. He is married and has two children.
