= Tommy Sullivan (curler) =

Canadian curler

- Curler
- Born: November 23, 1977 (age 48)

Team
- Curling club: Mayflower CC, Halifax, NS
- Skip: Tommy Sullivan
- Third: Brent MacDougall
- Second: Kirk MacDiarmid
- Lead: Martin Gavin

Curling career
- Member Association: Nova Scotia

Thomas Sullivan (born November 23, 1977) is a Canadian curler from Halifax, Nova Scotia.

Sullivan was originally from New Brunswick. As a junior curler, he skipped the New Brunswick team at the 1997 Canadian Junior Curling Championships. At the juniors, he led his team to a 7–5 round robin record, which was good enough to be in a five-way tie for third place. In order to make the playoffs, they would have to win two tiebreaker matches. They won their first game against the Yukon's Wyatt Redlin, but lost their second match against Ontario, skipped by future Olympic gold medalist John Morris.

The next year, Sullivan won his one and only provincial championship, playing third for the Terry Odishaw rink. The team represented New Brunswick at the 1998 Labatt Brier, finishing the event with a 4–7 record.

Sullivan later moved to Nova Scotia, and joined the Mark Dacey rink in 2009 at third. Sullivan won one World Curling Tour event with Dacey, the 2012 Challenge Chateau Cartier de Gatineau. They also played in one Grand Slam event, the 2014 National, with Sullivan throwing lead rocks. They did not make the playoffs.

Sullivan left the Dacey rink in 2014 to form his own team.

In mixed curling, Sullivan teamed up with Mary-Anne Arsenault to play in the 2014 Canadian Mixed Doubles Curling Trials. They won one game.
