= Kelly Mittelstadt =

Canadian curler

- Curler
- Born: June 1, 1975 (age 51); Edmonton, Alberta

Team
- Curling club: Lakeshore CC; Lower Sackville, NS
- Skip: Paul Flemming
- Third: Peter Burgess
- Second: Ian Juurlink
- Lead: Kelly Mittelstadt

Curling career
- Brier: 3 (2005, 2011, 2013)
Medal record
Men's curling
Representing Canada
World Junior Curling Championships
Gold medal – first place	1994 Sofia
Representing Nova Scotia
Tim Hortons Brier
Silver medal – second place	2005 Edmonton

Kelly Mittelstadt (born June 1, 1975, in Edmonton, Alberta) is a Canadian curler from Elmsdale, Nova Scotia. He currently plays lead on Team Paul Flemming.

== Career ==
Mittelstadt grew up in Alberta where he played juniors. He played third for Colin Davison's rink that won the 1994 Canadian Junior Curling Championships that year for Alberta. The team had defeated the Northwest Territories/Yukon team skipped by Kevin Koe in the final. At the 1994 World Junior Curling Championships, the team won a gold medal for Canada, defeated Germany's Daniel Herberg in the final.

Mittelstadt later moved to Nova Scotia, and in 2004 joined the Shawn Adams rink as his lead. The team went to the 2005 Tim Hortons Brier where the lost in the final to Alberta's Randy Ferbey. They played in their second Brier in 2011 where they missed the playoffs. He joined Ian Fitzner-Leblanc's team after the season, and played in the 2012 Nova Scotia men's provincials, falling out in the page playoffs against Kent Smith's team. Mittelstadt played in the provincials next year, with Paul Flemming skipping and Fitzner-Leblanc throwing fourth stones, and won his third provincial title after defeating Jamie Murphy. They played at the 2013 Tim Hortons Brier, where they finished with a 1–10 win–loss record.

== Personal life ==
Mittelstadt has a bachelor's degree in commerce from the University of Alberta and a bachelor's degree in law from Dalhousie University. He currently works as a lawyer with Burchell MacDougall.
