= Ian Fitzner-Leblanc =

Canadian curler

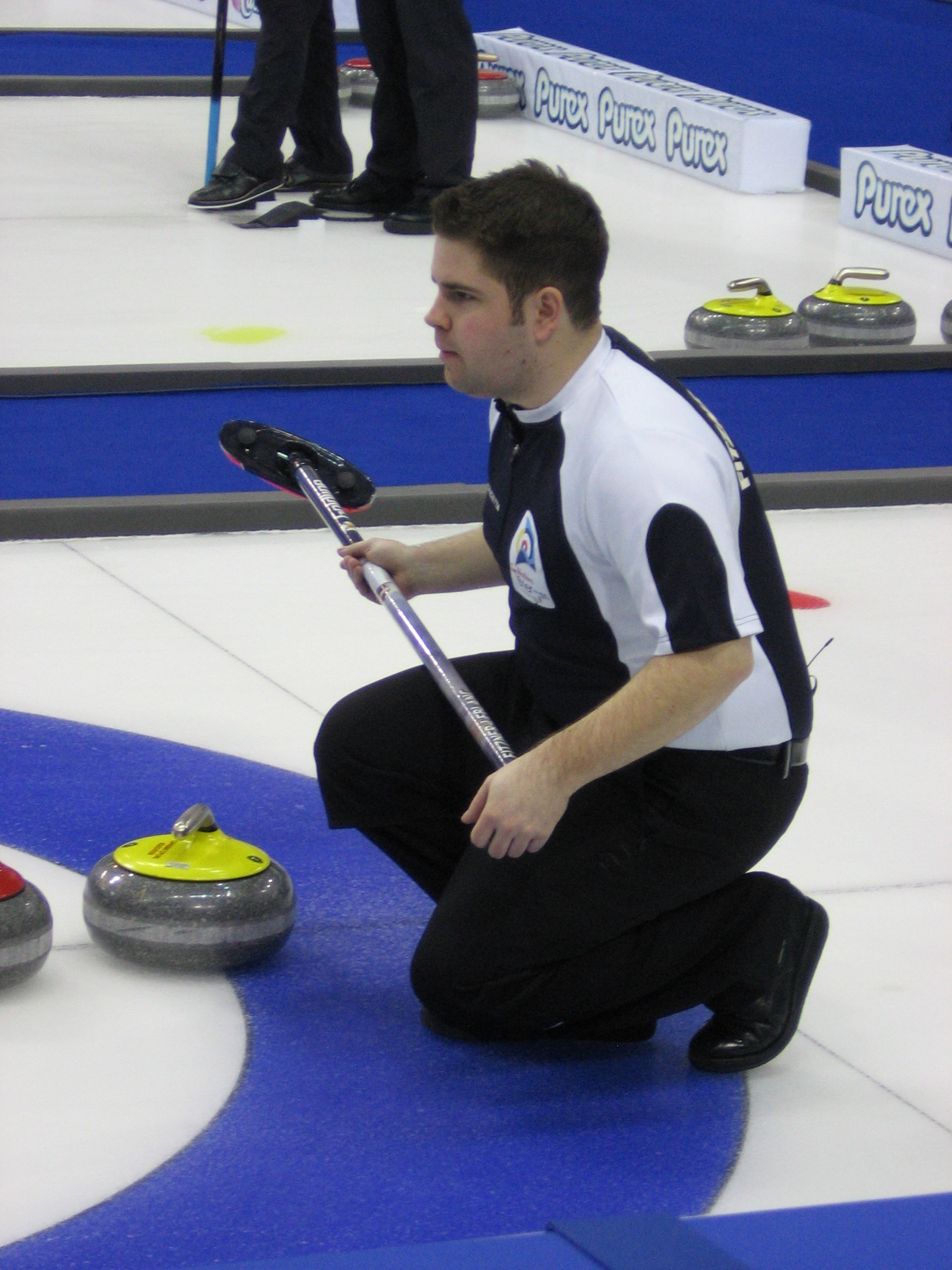
Fitzner-Leblanc in 2010

Ian Ryan Fitzner-Leblanc (born August 9, 1984, in Halifax, Nova Scotia) is a Canadian curler.

As a junior curler, Fitzner-Leblanc skipped the Nova Scotia team at the 2005 Canadian Junior Curling Championships. There, he led his team to a 9-3 record, good enough for third place. This qualified the rink for the semi-final, where they lost to Ontario, skipped by Mark Bice.

After juniors, Fitzner-Leblanc formed a men's team. He won his first provincial championship in 2010, sending him and his rink to the 2010 Tim Hortons Brier, held in his hometown of Halifax. He led the Nova Scotian team to a 3-8 record, missing the playoffs.

Fitzner-Leblanc joined the Paul Flemming rink for the 2012-13 season, throwing fourth stones for the team. That season, Fitzner-Leblanc would play in his first Grand Slam event, the 2012 ROGERS Masters of Curling. The team also won the Nova Scotia men's championship, sending Fitzner-Leblanc to his second Brier. At the 2013 Tim Hortons Brier, the team won just one game, finishing tied for last place. After the season, Flemming left the team, and Fitzner-Leblanc took over skipping duties.

== Personal life ==
He currently lives in Milton, Ontario.

His grandfather, Bob Fitzner, was the skip of team Nova Scotia at the 1977 Macdonald Brier.
