= Chad Stevens =

Canadian curler (born 1974)

- Curler
- Born: June 23, 1974 (age 52); Lunenburg, Nova Scotia, Canada

Team
- Curling club: Truro CC; Truro, NS
- Skip: Chad Stevens
- Third: Peter Burgess
- Second: Graham Breckon
- Lead: Kelly Mittelstadt

Curling career
- Top CTRS ranking: 20th (2014-15)

Chad Stevens (born June 23, 1974 in Lunenburg, Nova Scotia) is a Canadian curler from Chester, Nova Scotia. He skips on a rink on the World Curling Tour.

Stevens won the Curl Atlantic Championship in 2013 and 2014. He also won several provincial firefighter's championships, including 2001, 2009 and 2014.

On the World Curling Tour, Stevens has won one tour title, the 2013 Truro Cashspiel.
