= Paul Flemming =

Canadian curler

- Curler
- Born: October 8, 1968 (age 58); Halifax, Nova Scotia

Team
- Curling club: Halifax CC, Halifax, NS
- Skip: Paul Flemming
- Third: Peter Burgess
- Second: Ian Juurlink
- Lead: Kelly Mittelstadt

Curling career
- Member Association: Nova Scotia
- Brier: 11 (1998, 1999, 2001, 2005, 2011, 2013, 2015, 2018, 2020, 2021, 2022)
- Other appearances: World Senior Championship: 1 (2024)
- Top CTRS ranking: 13th (2004-05, 2007-08)
Medal record
Curling
Representing Canada
World Senior Curling Championships
Gold medal – first place	2024 Östersund
Representing Nova Scotia
Tim Hortons Brier
Silver medal – second place	2005 Edmonton
Canada Games
Silver medal – second place	1987 Sydney

Paul Flemming (born October 8, 1968, in Halifax, Nova Scotia) is a Canadian curler. In April 2024, Flemming's senior rink won the 2024 World Senior Curling Championships.

== Curling career ==
Flemming's junior team was successful in Atlantic Canada, however, the team was unable to ever win the Nova Scotia Junior Men's Championship, losing in the finals four times. Flemming's first nationals appearance was in 1987, where the team of Paul Flemming, Mike Mawhinney, Glen MacLeod, and Chris Oxner represented Nova Scotia at the Canada Winter Games in Sydney, Nova Scotia. The team earned an undefeated record in the round robin, including a victory over Ontario's Wayne Middaugh. In the semi-finals of the playoffs Flemming's team beat Saskatchewan to earn a spot in the gold medal match. The Flemming team played John Boswick of Manitoba in the final and they held a lead until Manitoba stole a point in the eighth and two in the tenth end for the win.

Flemming represented Nova Scotia at the Canadian Mixed Curling Championship in 1999 and 2003, winning the Championship both times. In 1999 the team consisted of Paul Flemming, Colleen Jones, Tom Fetterly, and Monica Moriarity. In 2003 the team consisted of Paul Flemming, Kim Kelly, Tom Fetterly, and Cathy Donald.

Flemming has competed for Team Nova Scotia at the Brier, Canada's national men's championship 11 times: 1998, 1999, 2013 and 2022 as skip, 2001 as third for Mark Dacey, in 2005 and 2011 as third for Shawn Adams, in 2018 and 2020 as third for Jamie Murphy, in 2021 as third for Scott McDonald and in 2015 as an alternate. In 2001 and 2013 he was awarded the event's Ross Harstone Trophy, which is a player-voted sportsmanship award.

Flemming, and his Nova Scotia rink of Peter Burgess, Martin Gavin and Kris Granchelli won the 2023 Canadian Senior Curling Championships, and represented Canada at the 2024 World Senior Curling Championships, where they went undefeated and won the gold medal, winning 4-3 in the final against Mike Farbelow of the United States.

== Personal life ==
Flemming is the younger brother of Canadian actor Peter Flemming. Flemming owns a restaurant called Harbour Fish N' Fries. He has two children. His father, Don represented Nova Scotia at the 1968 Macdonald Brier. He currently coaches the Tyler Smith rink.
