= 2014 Canadian Junior Curling Championships – Men's tournament =

2014 Canadian Junior Curling Championships Men's tournament
- Host city: Liverpool, Nova Scotia
- Arena: Queens Place Emera Centre; Liverpool Curling Club
- Dates: January 18–26
- Winner: Manitoba
- Curling club: Deer Lodge CC, Winnipeg
- Skip: Braden Calvert
- Third: Kyle Kruz
- Second: Lucas Van Den Bosch
- Lead: Brendan Wilson
- Finalist: New Brunswick (Rene Comeau)

The men's tournament of the 2014 M&M Meat Shops Canadian Junior Curling Championships was held from January 18 to 26 at the Queens Place Emera Centre and the Liverpool Curling Club.

== Teams ==
The teams are listed as follows:

Province	Skip	Third	Second	Lead	Club(s)
Alberta	Carter Lautner	Taylor Ardiel	David Aho	Kyle Morrison	Glencoe CC, Calgary
British Columbia	Cameron de Jong	Brook Calibaba	Ryan Cassidy	Alex Horvath	Juan De Fuca CC, Victoria; Victoria CC, Victoria
Manitoba	Braden Calvert	Kyle Kurz	Lucas Van Den Bosch	Brendan Wilson	Deer Lodge CC, Winnipeg
New Brunswick	Rene Comeau	Daniel Wenzek	Jordon Craft	Ryan Freeze	Capital WC, Fredericton
Newfoundland and Labrador	Stephen Trickett	Adam Boland	Evan Kearley	Zach Young	Re/Max Centre, St. John's
Northwest Territories	Matthew Miller	Randy Hiebert	Cody Snyder	Deklen Crocker	Inuvik CC, Inuvik
Northern Ontario	Tanner Horgan	Nicholas Servant	Jacob Horgan	Maxime Blais	Idylwylde G&CC, Sudbury
Nova Scotia	Robert Mayhew	Michael Brophy	Matt Jackson	Ben Creaser	Windsor CC, Windsor
Nunavut	Jamie Airut	Connor Faulkner	Arthur Siksik	Kane Komaksiutiksak	Qavik CC, Rankin Inlet
Ontario	Ryan McCrady	Doug Kee	Matt Haughn	Cole Lyon-Hatcher	Rideau CC, Ottawa
Prince Edward Island	Tony Nabuurs (fourth)	Kyle Holland (skip)	Alex Sutherland	Taylor McInnis	Charlottetown CC, Charlottetown
Saskatchewan	Tyler Hartung	Mat Ring	Brendan Ryan	Brandon Leippi	Langenburg CC, Langenburg
Quebec	Adam Freilich	Maxandre Caron	Alexandre Bergeron-Gallant	Jason Olsthoorn	Montréal-Ouest CC, Montreal; CC Boucherville, Boucherville; CC Victoria, Quebec City
Yukon	Joe Wallingham	Brayden Klassen	Spencer Wallace	Trygg Jensen	Whitehorse CC, Whitehorse

== Round-robin standings ==
Final Standings

Key
Teams to Championship Pool

Pool A	Skip	W	L
Manitoba	Braden Calvert	6	0
Saskatchewan	Tyler Hartung	4	2
Ontario	Ryan McCrady	4	2
Northern Ontario	Tanner Horgan	4	2
Quebec	Adam Freilich	2	4
Newfoundland and Labrador	Stephen Trickett	1	5
Nunavut	Jamie Airut	0	6

Pool B	Skip	W	L
New Brunswick	Rene Comeau	5	1
Alberta	Carter Lautner	5	1
Nova Scotia	Robert Mayhew	4	2
British Columbia	Cameron de Jong	3	3
Yukon	Joe Wallingham	2	4
Prince Edward Island	Kyle Holland	1	5
Northwest Territories	Matthew Miller	1	5

== Round-robin results ==
All draw times are listed in Atlantic Standard Time (UTC−4).

=== Pool A ===
==== Draw 1 ====
Saturday, January 18, 9:30 am

Sheet A	1	2	3	4	5	6	7	8	9	10	Final
Saskatchewan (Hartung) 🔨	2	0	2	0	0	1	0	0	X	X	5
Ontario (McCrady)	0	4	0	1	0	0	3	2	X	X	10

Sheet C	1	2	3	4	5	6	7	8	9	10	Final
Nunavut (Airut) 🔨	2	0	1	0	0	0	0	0	0	1	4
Manitoba (Calvert)	0	2	0	1	4	3	1	4	3	0	18

Sheet E	1	2	3	4	5	6	7	8	9	10	Final
Quebec (Freilich) 🔨	1	0	0	2	0	1	0	1	0	0	5
Northern Ontario (Horgan)	0	0	0	0	2	0	2	0	1	2	7

==== Draw 2 ====
Saturday, January 18, 2:00 pm

Sheet E	1	2	3	4	5	6	7	8	9	10	Final
Newfoundland and Labrador (Trickett) 🔨	0	1	0	1	0	1	0	1	0	1	5
Saskatchewan (Hartung)	2	0	0	0	1	0	2	0	1	0	6

Sheet G	1	2	3	4	5	6	7	8	9	10	Final
Quebec (Freilich)	0	0	2	0	0	0	1	0	0	X	3
Manitoba (Calvert) 🔨	0	1	0	0	2	0	0	1	2	X	6

==== Draw 3 ====
Saturday, January 18, 7:30 pm

Sheet E	1	2	3	4	5	6	7	8	9	10	Final
Ontario (McCrady) 🔨	2	2	1	3	0	1	1	1	X	X	10
Nunavut (Airut)	0	0	0	0	1	0	0	0	X	X	1

==== Draw 4 ====
Sunday, January 19, 9:30 am

Sheet A	1	2	3	4	5	6	7	8	9	10	Final
Newfoundland and Labrador (Trickett)	3	2	2	1	3	1	2	2	X	X	16
Nunavut (Airut) 🔨	0	0	0	0	0	0	0	0	X	X	0

Sheet C	1	2	3	4	5	6	7	8	9	10	Final
Northern Ontario (Horgan)	0	0	0	1	0	1	0	2	X	X	4
Manitoba (Calvert) 🔨	0	3	2	0	3	0	2	0	X	X	10

Sheet F	1	2	3	4	5	6	7	8	9	10	Final
Ontario (McCrady) 🔨	0	0	1	0	0	3	1	0	3	X	8
Quebec (Freilich)	0	0	0	2	0	0	0	1	0	X	3

==== Draw 5 ====
Sunday, January 19, 2:00 pm

Sheet F	1	2	3	4	5	6	7	8	9	10	Final
Newfoundland and Labrador (Trickett)	0	0	0	1	0	1	1	0	1	X	4
Ontario (McCrady) 🔨	1	0	1	0	3	0	0	2	0	X	7

Sheet H	1	2	3	4	5	6	7	8	9	10	Final
Manitoba (Calvert)	0	0	4	0	0	0	1	1	X	X	6
Saskatchewan (Hartung) 🔨	1	0	0	1	0	0	0	0	X	X	2

==== Draw 6 ====
Sunday, January 19, 6:30 pm

Sheet H	1	2	3	4	5	6	7	8	9	10	Final
Northern Ontario (Horgan)	1	3	1	2	1	0	2	0	X	X	10
Nunavut (Airut) 🔨	0	0	0	0	0	1	0	1	X	X	2

==== Draw 7 ====
Monday, January 20, 9:30 am

Sheet B	1	2	3	4	5	6	7	8	9	10	Final
Ontario (McCrady) 🔨	0	0	1	0	0	0	0	2	1	X	4
Northern Ontario (Horgan)	0	4	0	1	0	0	1	0	0	X	6

Sheet D	1	2	3	4	5	6	7	8	9	10	Final
Quebec (Freilich) 🔨	1	0	3	0	2	0	1	0	1	0	8
Newfoundland and Labrador (Trickett)	0	1	0	1	0	2	0	2	0	1	7

Sheet F	1	2	3	4	5	6	7	8	9	10	Final
Nunavut (Airut)	1	0	0	1	0	0	0	0	X	X	2
Saskatchewan (Hartung) 🔨	0	4	2	0	4	0	1	2	X	X	13

==== Draw 8 ====
Monday, January 20, 2:00 pm

Sheet E	1	2	3	4	5	6	7	8	9	10	Final
Nunavut (Airut)	0	0	1	0	0	1	0	0	X	X	2
Quebec (Freilich) 🔨	2	2	0	1	3	0	2	2	X	X	12

Sheet G	1	2	3	4	5	6	7	8	9	10	Final
Saskatchewan (Hartung) 🔨	0	0	2	1	0	1	0	0	0	1	5
Northern Ontario (Horgan)	1	0	0	0	0	0	1	1	0	0	3

==== Draw 9 ====
Monday, January 20, 6:30 pm

Sheet B	1	2	3	4	5	6	7	8	9	10	Final
Manitoba (Calvert)	0	2	0	2	1	0	2	3	X	X	10
Newfoundland and Labrador (Trickett) 🔨	1	0	2	0	0	2	0	0	X	X	5

==== Draw 10 ====
Tuesday, January 21, 9:30 am

Sheet B	1	2	3	4	5	6	7	8	9	10	Final
Saskatchewan (Hartung) 🔨	1	0	0	0	3	0	1	3	0	X	8
Quebec (Freilich)	0	1	2	2	0	0	0	0	1	X	6

Sheet C	1	2	3	4	5	6	7	8	9	10	Final
Northern Ontario (Horgan) 🔨	2	0	1	0	2	0	0	2	0	X	7
Newfoundland and Labrador (Trickett)	0	0	0	2	0	0	1	0	1	X	4

Sheet D	1	2	3	4	5	6	7	8	9	10	Final
Manitoba (Calvert)	0	2	0	1	0	0	4	0	0	X	7
Ontario (McCrady) 🔨	1	0	0	0	1	0	0	1	1	X	4

=== Pool B ===
==== Draw 1 ====
Saturday, January 18, 9:30 am

Sheet B	1	2	3	4	5	6	7	8	9	10	Final
New Brunswick (Comeau) 🔨	1	0	0	2	0	0	2	1	0	2	8
Nova Scotia (Mayhew)	0	0	2	0	0	4	0	0	1	0	7

Sheet D	1	2	3	4	5	6	7	8	9	10	Final
Northwest Territories (Miller) 🔨	0	0	1	0	0	0	0	1	X	X	2
Alberta (Lautner)	2	0	0	2	1	2	1	0	X	X	8

Sheet F	1	2	3	4	5	6	7	8	9	10	Final
British Columbia (de Jong) 🔨	0	0	1	0	2	0	1	0	0	X	4
Yukon (Wallingham)	0	1	0	1	0	2	0	1	1	X	6

==== Draw 2 ====
Saturday, January 18, 2:00 pm

Sheet F	1	2	3	4	5	6	7	8	9	10	Final
Prince Edward Island (Holland)	0	3	0	0	1	0	0	2	1	X	7
New Brunswick (Comeau) 🔨	1	0	5	2	0	3	1	0	0	X	12

Sheet H	1	2	3	4	5	6	7	8	9	10	Final
British Columbia (de Jong)	0	0	0	0	1	0	0	0	0	X	1
Alberta (Lautner) 🔨	0	0	1	0	0	0	1	1	2	X	5

==== Draw 3 ====
Saturday, January 18, 7:30 pm

Sheet F	1	2	3	4	5	6	7	8	9	10	Final
Nova Scotia (Mayhew)	0	0	2	0	2	3	3	0	X	X	10
Northwest Territories (Miller)	0	1	0	0	0	0	0	1	X	X	2

==== Draw 4 ====
Sunday, January 19, 9:30 am

Sheet B	1	2	3	4	5	6	7	8	9	10	Final
Prince Edward Island (Holland) 🔨	2	0	2	1	0	1	2	3	X	X	11
Northwest Territories (Miller)	0	2	0	0	1	0	0	0	X	X	3

Sheet D	1	2	3	4	5	6	7	8	9	10	Final
Nova Scotia (Mayhew)	1	0	1	1	1	3	2	0	X	X	9
British Columbia (de Jong) 🔨	0	0	0	0	0	0	0	2	X	X	2

Sheet E	1	2	3	4	5	6	7	8	9	10	Final
Yukon (Wallingham) 🔨	1	0	0	3	0	1	0	0	1	X	6
Alberta (Lautner)	0	0	2	0	2	0	0	4	0	X	8

==== Draw 5 ====
Sunday, January 19, 2:00 pm

Sheet E	1	2	3	4	5	6	7	8	9	10	Final
Prince Edward Island (Holland)	2	0	2	0	2	0	0	0	X	X	6
Nova Scotia (Mayhew) 🔨	0	2	0	1	0	6	0	3	X	X	12

Sheet G	1	2	3	4	5	6	7	8	9	10	Final
Alberta (Lautner)	0	0	4	1	0	2	0	0	0	0	7
New Brunswick (Comeau) 🔨	0	2	0	0	2	0	2	0	2	4	12

==== Draw 6 ====
Sunday, January 19, 6:30 pm

Sheet G	1	2	3	4	5	6	7	8	9	10	Final
Yukon (Wallingham) 🔨	2	1	1	0	0	0	0	0	0	0	4
Northwest Territories (Miller)	0	0	0	1	1	1	0	2	1	1	7

==== Draw 7 ====
Monday, January 20, 9:30 am

Sheet A	1	2	3	4	5	6	7	8	9	10	Final
Nova Scotia (Mayhew) 🔨	2	0	0	0	0	2	0	0	0	1	5
Yukon (Wallingham)	0	0	0	1	0	0	1	1	0	0	3

Sheet C	1	2	3	4	5	6	7	8	9	10	Final
Northwest Territories (Miller)	0	2	0	1	1	0	1	0	X	X	5
New Brunswick (Comeau)	6	0	3	0	0	2	0	0	X	X	11

Sheet H	1	2	3	4	5	6	7	8	9	10	Final
British Columbia (de Jong) 🔨	2	0	1	0	1	0	1	3	1	X	9
Prince Edward Island (Holland)	0	0	0	3	0	1	0	0	0	X	4

==== Draw 8 ====
Monday, January 20, 2:00 pm

Sheet C	1	2	3	4	5	6	7	8	9	10	Final
Alberta (Lautner)	3	0	0	5	2	0	1	0	X	X	11
Prince Edward Island (Holland) 🔨	0	1	1	0	0	1	0	1	X	X	4

Sheet D	1	2	3	4	5	6	7	8	9	10	Final
New Brunswick (Comeau) 🔨	1	0	2	0	2	0	2	1	X	X	8
Yukon (Wallingham)	0	0	0	1	0	1	0	0	X	X	2

==== Draw 9 ====
Monday, January 20, 6:30 pm

Sheet E	1	2	3	4	5	6	7	8	9	10	Final
Northwest Territories (Miller) 🔨	1	0	0	1	0	0	1	0	X	X	3
British Columbia (de Jong)	0	3	5	0	4	1	0	1	X	X	14

==== Draw 11 ====
Tuesday, January 21, 2:00 pm

Sheet B	1	2	3	4	5	6	7	8	9	10	Final
Yukon (Wallingham) 🔨	1	1	0	2	1	1	0	1	0	4	11
Prince Edward Island (Holland)	0	0	1	0	0	0	1	0	4	0	6

Sheet C	1	2	3	4	5	6	7	8	9	10	Final
New Brunswick (Comeau) 🔨	1	2	0	1	2	0	0	0	1	0	7
British Columbia (de Jong)	0	0	3	0	0	2	2	1	0	1	9

Sheet D	1	2	3	4	5	6	7	8	9	10	11	Final
Alberta (Lautner)	0	0	2	0	1	0	1	0	0	0	3	7
Nova Scotia (Mayhew) 🔨	1	0	0	2	0	0	0	0	0	1	0	4

== Placement Round ==
=== Seeding Pool ===
==== Standings ====
Final Standings

Province	Skip	W	L
Yukon	Joe Wallingham	5	4
Quebec	Adam Freilich	3	6
Newfoundland and Labrador	Stephen Trickett	3	6
Prince Edward Island	Kyle Holland	3	6
Northwest Territories	Matthew Miller	2	7
Nunavut	Jamie Airut	0	9

===== Draw 1 =====
Tuesday, January 21, 6:30 pm

Team	1	2	3	4	5	6	7	8	9	10	Final
Newfoundland and Labrador (Trickett)	2	0	0	3	1	0	3	0	0	1	10
Prince Edward Island (Holland) 🔨	0	2	1	0	0	2	0	2	1	0	8

Team	1	2	3	4	5	6	7	8	9	10	Final
Nunavut (Airut) 🔨	0	0	2	0	5	0	0	0	0	X	7
Northwest Territories (Miller)	1	1	0	2	0	2	5	1	1	X	13

===== Draw 2 =====
Wednesday, January 22, 9:30 am

Team	1	2	3	4	5	6	7	8	9	10	Final
Quebec (Freilich)	0	0	0	1	1	0	2	0	0	X	4
Yukon (Wallingham) 🔨	1	2	2	0	0	1	0	3	2	X	11

Team	1	2	3	4	5	6	7	8	9	10	Final
Northwest Territories (Miller)	1	0	2	1	0	0	0	0	0	X	4
Newfoundland and Labrador (Trickett) 🔨	0	1	0	0	3	0	2	0	1	X	7

===== Draw 3 =====
Thursday, January 23, 2:00 pm

Team	1	2	3	4	5	6	7	8	9	10	Final
Prince Edward Island (Holland) 🔨	1	0	2	2	2	0	5	0	X	X	12
Nunavut (Airut)	0	1	0	0	0	1	0	0	X	X	2

===== Draw 4 =====
Thursday, January 23, 6:30 pm

Team	1	2	3	4	5	6	7	8	9	10	Final
Newfoundland and Labrador (Trickett) 🔨	2	0	0	0	1	0	1	0	1	0	5
Yukon (Wallingham)	0	0	0	2	0	2	0	1	0	1	6

Team	1	2	3	4	5	6	7	8	9	10	Final
Quebec (Freilich) 🔨	3	0	2	1	3	0	0	1	X	X	10
Northwest Territories (Miller)	0	1	0	0	0	1	1	0	X	X	3

===== Draw 5 =====
Friday, January 24, 12:30 pm

Team	1	2	3	4	5	6	7	8	9	10	11	Final
Prince Edward Island (Holland)	0	0	0	3	0	0	1	1	1	2	1	9
Quebec (Freilich) 🔨	1	0	4	0	2	1	0	0	0	0	0	8

Team	1	2	3	4	5	6	7	8	9	10	Final
Yukon (Wallingham) 🔨	1	1	3	0	4	0	0	2	X	X	11
Nunavut (Airut)	0	0	0	1	0	0	2	0	X	X	3

=== Championship Pool ===
==== Standings ====
Final Standings

Key
Teams to Playoffs

Province	Skip	W	L
Manitoba	Braden Calvert	9	1
New Brunswick	Rene Comeau	7	3
Alberta	Carter Lautner	7	3
Ontario	Ryan McCrady	6	4
Nova Scotia	Robert Mayhew	6	4
Saskatchewan	Tyler Hartung	6	4
Northern Ontario	Tanner Horgan	5	5
British Columbia	Cameron de Jong	5	5

===== Draw 1 =====
Wednesday, January 22, 2:00 pm

Team	1	2	3	4	5	6	7	8	9	10	Final
Saskatchewan (Hartung)	0	2	0	0	1	1	0	1	0	1	6
Alberta (Lautner) 🔨	1	0	0	1	0	0	1	0	0	0	3

Team	1	2	3	4	5	6	7	8	9	10	Final
Manitoba (Calvert) 🔨	0	2	0	0	1	1	0	2	0	X	6
New Brunswick (Comeau)	0	0	1	1	0	0	1	0	1	X	4

Team	1	2	3	4	5	6	7	8	9	10	Final
Northern Ontario (Horgan) 🔨	2	0	1	0	0	3	0	1	3	X	10
British Columbia (de Jong)	0	2	0	1	1	0	1	0	0	X	5

Team	1	2	3	4	5	6	7	8	9	10	Final
Ontario (McCrady)	0	0	2	0	0	1	0	0	0	2	5
Nova Scotia (Mayhew) 🔨	0	1	0	1	0	0	0	2	0	0	4

===== Draw 2 =====
Wednesday, January 22, 6:30 pm

Team	1	2	3	4	5	6	7	8	9	10	Final
Saskatchewan (Hartung) 🔨	0	0	1	3	0	0	0	2	0	X	6
New Brunswick (Comeau)	1	2	0	0	2	1	2	0	1	X	9

Team	1	2	3	4	5	6	7	8	9	10	Final
Ontario (McCrady) 🔨	0	1	0	0	0	1	0	0	1	0	3
British Columbia (de Jong)	0	0	0	1	1	0	0	1	0	1	4

Team	1	2	3	4	5	6	7	8	9	10	Final
Manitoba (Calvert) 🔨	1	0	0	0	1	1	0	0	2	0	5
Alberta (Lautner)	0	1	1	0	0	0	1	0	0	1	4

Team	1	2	3	4	5	6	7	8	9	10	Final
Northern Ontario (Horgan)	0	1	0	2	0	0	2	0	X	X	5
Nova Scotia (Mayhew) 🔨	3	0	4	0	2	0	0	1	X	X	10

===== Draw 3 =====
Thursday, January 23, 9:30 am

Team	1	2	3	4	5	6	7	8	9	10	Final
British Columbia (de Jong) 🔨	1	0	0	3	0	1	0	0	2	1	8
Manitoba (Calvert)	0	1	1	0	1	0	1	2	0	0	6

Team	1	2	3	4	5	6	7	8	9	10	Final
New Brunswick (Comeau) 🔨	2	0	1	0	0	1	0	1	0	0	5
Northern Ontario (Horgan)	0	0	0	0	1	0	1	0	1	1	4

===== Draw 4 =====
Thursday, January 23, 2:00 pm

Team	1	2	3	4	5	6	7	8	9	10	Final
Nova Scotia (Mayhew)	0	0	0	1	0	0	1	0	X	X	2
Manitoba (Calvert) 🔨	0	2	1	0	1	1	0	3	X	X	8

Team	1	2	3	4	5	6	7	8	9	10	Final
British Columbia (de Jong)	0	1	0	0	2	0	1	0	X	X	4
Saskatchewan (Hartung) 🔨	2	0	1	3	0	2	0	3	X	X	11

Team	1	2	3	4	5	6	7	8	9	10	Final
Alberta (Lautner)	0	0	1	0	1	0	0	2	0	0	4
Ontario (McCrady)	0	0	0	0	0	0	1	0	1	0	2

===== Draw 5 =====
Friday, January 24, 8:00 am

Team	1	2	3	4	5	6	7	8	9	10	Final
New Brunswick (Comeau) 🔨	0	0	0	1	0	0	1	0	1	0	3
Ontario (McCrady)	0	0	1	0	0	1	0	0	0	2	4

Team	1	2	3	4	5	6	7	8	9	10	Final
Nova Scotia (Mayhew) 🔨	0	0	1	0	2	0	3	0	X	X	6
Saskatchewan (Hartung)	1	0	0	1	0	0	0	1	X	X	3

Team	1	2	3	4	5	6	7	8	9	10	Final
Alberta (Lautner)	0	0	0	4	1	1	0	1	X	X	7
Northern Ontario (Horgan) 🔨	0	0	2	0	0	0	0	0	X	X	2

== Playoffs ==
Semifinal			Final
			1	Manitoba	7
2	New Brunswick	9	2	New Brunswick	5
3	Alberta	4

=== Semifinal ===
Sunday, January 26, 9:30 am

Sheet B	1	2	3	4	5	6	7	8	9	10	Final
New Brunswick (Comeau) 🔨	0	2	2	3	0	1	0	0	1	X	9
Alberta (Lautner)	0	0	0	0	1	0	2	1	0	X	4

Player percentages
New Brunswick		Alberta	
Ryan Freeze	71%	Kyle Morrison	88%
Jordon Craft	84%	David Aho	75%
Daniel Wenzek	71%	Taylor Ardiel	67%
Rene Comeau	83%	Carter Lautner	78%
Total	77%	Total	77%

=== Final ===
Sunday, January 26, 4:00 pm

Team	1	2	3	4	5	6	7	8	9	10	Final
Manitoba (Calvert) 🔨	1	0	1	4	0	0	0	1	0	X	7
New Brunswick (Comeau)	0	2	0	0	2	0	1	0	0	X	5

Player percentages
Manitoba		New Brunswick	
Brendan Wilson	84%	Ryan Freeze	85%
Lucas Van Den Bosch	88%	Jordon Craft	90%
Kyle Kruz	81%	Daniel Wenzek	86%
Braden Calvert	85%	Rene Comeau	88%
Total	84%	Total	87%

2014 Canadian Junior Men's Curling Champions
(Manitoba)
Manitoba
8th Junior Men's National Championship title

== Awards ==
The all-star teams and award winners are as follows:

=== All-Star teams ===
Women

First Team

- Skip: Kelsey Rocque, Alberta 79%
- Third: Marika Van Osch, British Columbia 81%
- Second: Sarah Daniels, British Columbia 80%
- Lead: Karlee Korchinski, Saskatchewan 82%

Second Team

- Skip: Mary Fay, Nova Scotia 73%
- Third: Amy Heitzner, Ontario 77%
- Second: Karlee Burgess, Nova Scotia 76%
- Lead: Ashley Sanderson, British Columbia 80%

Men

First Team

- Skip: Carter Lautner, Alberta 80%
- Third: Michael Brophy, Nova Scotia 80%
- Second: Lucas Van Den Bosch, Manitoba 81%
- Lead: Jason Olsthoorn, Quebec 81%

Second Team

- Skip: (Ontario) Ryan McCrady, Manitoba 77%
- Third: Daniel Wenzek, New Brunswick 79%
- Second: David Aho, Alberta 79%
- Lead: Cole Lyon-Hatcher, Ontario 81%

=== Ken Watson Sportsmanship Awards ===
Women

- Patty Wallingham, Yukon second

Men

- Taylor Ardriel, Alberta third

=== Fair Play Awards ===
Women

- Lead: Hilary Charlie, Northwest Territories
- Second: Danielle Lafleur, Manitoba
- Third: Abby Ackland, Manitoba
- Skip: Carina McKay-Saturnino, Northwest Territories
- Coach: Dale McEwen, Manitoba

Men

- Lead: Deklen Crocker, Northwest Territories
- Second: Alex Sutherland, Prince Edward Island
- Third: Connor Faulkner, Nunavut
- Skip: Rene Comeau, New Brunswick
- Coach: Tom Clasper, Manitoba

=== ASHAM National Coaching Awards ===
Women

- Nick Saturnino, Northwest Territories

Men

- Tom Clasper, Manitoba

=== Joan Mead Legacy Awards ===
Women

- Cathlia Ward, New Brunswick Third

Men

- Cole Lyon-Hatcher, Ontario Lead
