= 2019 NB Tankard =

- Host city: Moncton, New Brunswick
- Arena: Curl Moncton
- Dates: Jan. 23-27
- Winner: Team Odishaw
- Curling club: Curl Moncton
- Skip: Terry Odishaw
- Third: Mike Kennedy
- Second: Marc LeCocq
- Lead: Grant Odishaw
- Alternate: Jordan Pinder
- Finalist: James Grattan

The 2019 NB Tankard, the provincial men's curling championship of New Brunswick was held January 23 to 27 at Curl Moncton in Moncton, New Brunswick. The winning Terry Odishaw team represented New Brunswick at the 2019 Tim Hortons Brier in Brandon, Manitoba.

The event was held in conjunction with the 2019 New Brunswick Scotties Tournament of Hearts, the provincial women's curling championship.

== Teams ==
The teams are listed as follows:

Skip	Third	Second	Lead	Alternate	Club(s)
Rene Comeau	Ryan Freeze	Jordon Craft	Zac Blanchard		Gage Golf & Curling Club, Oromocto
Dan Crouse	David DeAdder	Samuel Forestell	Matthew Magee		Curl Moncton, Moncton
Edward Cyr	Alex Robichaud	Chris Wagner	Alex Kyle		Capital Winter Club, Fredericton
Paul Dobson	Spencer Watts	Mark Dobson	Spencer Mawhinney		Thistle-St. Andrew's Curling Club, Saint John
James Grattan	Chris Jeffrey	Andy McCann	Peter Case		Gage Golf & Curling Club, Oromocto
Scott Jones	Jamie Brannen	Brian King	Robert Daley		Curl Moncton, Moncton
Terry Odishaw	Mike Kennedy	Marc LeCocq	Grant Odishaw	Jordan Pinder	Curl Moncton, Moncton
Jason Vaughan	Jeremy Mallais	Darren Roach	Jared Bezanson		Thistle-St. Andrew's Curling Club, Saint John

== Round robin standings ==
Key
Teams to Playoffs
Teams to Tiebreakers

Team	W	L
Grattan	6	1
Odishaw	6	1
Cyr	4	3
Jones	4	3
Dobson	3	4
Vaughan	3	4
Comeau	1	6
Crouse	1	6

== Scores ==
The schedule is as follows:

=== January 23 ===
Draw 1

- Crouse 8-4 Jones
- Grattan 5-4 Cyr
- Odishaw 8-1 Vaughan
- Dobson 10-4 Comeau

Draw 3

- Dobson 8-7 Vaughan
- Odishaw 7-5 Comeau
- Jones 7-5 Cyr
- Grattan 11-2 Crouse

=== January 24 ===
Draw 4

- Odishaw 10-4 Grattan
- Cyr 9-2 Vaughan

Draw 5

- Odishaw 6-4 Cyr
- Grattan 6-4 Vaughan
- Dobson 9-4 Crouse
- Jones 5-4 Comeau

Draw 6

- Comeau 10-4 Crouse
- Jones 9-3 Dobson

=== January 25 ===
Draw 7

- Vaughan 8-3 Jones
- Odishaw 7-3 Crouse

Draw 8

- Jones 9-2 Odishaw
- Vaughan 9-2 Crouse
- Grattan 9-4 Comeau
- Cyr 7-6 Dobson

Draw 9

- Grattan 10-0 Dobson
- Cyr 9-4 Comeau

=== January 26 ===
Draw 10

- Vaughan 4-3 Comeau
- Odishaw 8-3 Dobson
- Cyr 12-1 Crouse
- Grattan 7-3 Jones

Tiebreaker

- Jones 7-6 Cyr

== Playoffs ==
Semifinal			Final
			1	Terry Odishaw	7
2	James Grattan	7	2	James Grattan	4
3	Scott Jones	4

=== Semifinal ===
January 26, 8:00pm

Sheet 3	1	2	3	4	5	6	7	8	9	10	Final
James Grattan 🔨	2	0	0	1	0	1	0	3	0	X	7
Scott Jones	0	0	0	0	2	0	1	0	1	X	4

=== Final ===
January 27, 9:00am

Sheet 4	1	2	3	4	5	6	7	8	9	10	Final
Terry Odishaw 🔨	0	1	1	0	1	0	2	2	0	X	7
James Grattan	0	0	0	2	0	0	0	0	2	X	4

2019 NB Tankard
(New Brunswick)
Terry Odishaw
4th NB Provincial Championship title
