= Andrea Sinclair =

Canadian curler

- Curler
- Born: May 14, 1993 (age 33); Ottawa, Ontario, Canada

Team
- Curling club: Ottawa CC, Ottawa, ON

Curling career
- Member Association: Ontario (2009-2013); Yukon (2013-2014)
- Hearts: 1 (2014)
- World Championship: 0
Medal record
Women's Curling
Representing Ontario
Canada Winter Games
Bronze medal – third place	2011 Halifax

Andrea Sinclair (born May 14, 1993) is a Canadian curler from Ottawa, Ontario. In 2013, she relocated to Whitehorse, Yukon, and has since returned to Ottawa. She is one of the few players to participate in both the junior and adult national championships in a single year: the 2014 Canadian Junior Curling Championships and the 2014 Scotties Tournament of Hearts.

After winning the 2010 Ontario Winter Games, Sinclair made her first national appearance at the 2011 Canada Winter Games in Halifax, Nova Scotia, where she played third for team Ontario, skipped by Lauren Horton. Her rink, playing out of the Huntley Curling Club, won a bronze medal at the games.

In 2013, Sinclair relocated to Whitehorse to play with Sarah Koltun's team, which placed fifth at the 2011 Canada Winter Games and fourth at the 2013 Canadian Junior Curling Championships. Two of the members of that team, Koltun and second Patty Wallingham, were age-eligible for both junior and adult play in 2014, and with the addition of Sinclair they were able to field a team in both competitions.

At the 2014 Canadian Junior Curling Championships, Sinclair and the Yukon team lost a tie-breaker to enter the championship round, and finished tenth overall. After the main competition finished, the 88 players who did not qualify for the playoffs competed in a mixed doubles tournament, which Sinclair won with BC skip Cameron de Jong and Yukon men's coach Kevin Patterson.
