= 2017 Deloitte Tankard =

- Host city: Halifax, Nova Scotia
- Arena: Mayflower Curling Club
- Dates: January 23–29
- Winner: Jamie Murphy
- Curling club: Mayflower CC, Halifax
- Skip: Jamie Murphy
- Third: Jordan Pinder
- Second: Scott Saccary
- Lead: Phil Crowell
- Alternate: Allan Darraugh
- Finalist: Stuart Thompson

The 2017 Deloitte Tankard, the provincial men's curling championship of Nova Scotia, was held from January 19 to 24 at the Mayflower Curling Club in Halifax. The winning Jamie Murphy team represented Nova Scotia at the 2017 Tim Hortons Brier in St.John's, Newfoundland.

== Teams ==
Teams are as follows:

Skip	Third	Second	Lead	Alternate	Club(s)
Paul Dexter	Mark Robar	Michael Brophy	Taylor Ardiel		Mayflower Curling Club, Halifax
Mike Flemming	Kevin Ouellette	Kris Granchelli	Donald McDermaid		Mayflower Curling Club, Halifax
Kendal Thompson	Bryce Everist	Brendan Lavell	Jamie Danbrook	Luke Saunders	Nova Scotia Curling Association
Brent MacDougall	Shea Steele	Kirk MacDiarmid	Jared Brown	Paul Landry	Mayflower Curling Club, Halifax
Robert Mayhew	Chris MacRae	Neil Gallant	Nick Burdock		Lakeshore Curling Club, Lower Sackville
Jamie Murphy	Jordan Pinder	Scott Saccary	Phil Crowell	Alan Darragh	Halifax Curling Club, Halifax
Chad Stevens	Cameron MacKenzie	Ian Juurlink	Kelly Mittelstadt	Graham Breckon	Mayflower Curling Club, Halifax
Stuart Thompson	Colten Steele	Travis Colter	Alex MacNeil	Bill MacPhee	Dartmouth Curling Club, Dartmouth

== Round robin standings ==
Key
Teams to Playoffs
Teams to Tiebreaker

Skip	W	L
Murphy	6	1
S.Thompson	5	2
MacDougall	4	3
Stevens	3	4
Dexter	3	4
K.Thompson	3	4
Flemming	2	5
Mayhew	2	5

== Scores ==
Draw 2

- Dexter 8-6 Mayhew
- Murphy 9-1 Flemming
- S. Thompson 5-1 MacDougall
- Stevens 8-2 K. Thompson

Draw 4

- S. Thompson 12-6 Flemming
- Dexter 10-4 K. Thompson
- Mayhew 8-6 Stevens
- MacDougall 8-7 Murphy

Draw 6

- MacDougall 10-1 Stevens
- Mayhew 5-3 S. Thompson
- Murphy 8-1 K. Thompson
- Dexter 9-3 Flemming

Draw 8

- Murphy 8-2 S. Thompson
- Stevens 8-2 Dexter
- Flemming 5-4 MacDougall
- K. Thompson 8-4 Mayhew

Draw 10

- MacDougall 9-7 Dexter
- Murphy 7-4 Mayhew
- S. Thompson 9-8 K. Thompson
- Stevens 8-1 Flemming

Draw 12

- Murphy 8-3 Stevens
- K. Thompson 8-6 MacDougall
- Flemming 7-2 Mayhew
- S. Thompson 9-4 Dexter

Draw 14

- K. Thompson 9-8 Flemming
- S. Thompson 9-4 Stevens
- Murphy 4-3 Dexter
- MacDougall 8-6 Mayhew

== Playoffs ==
Semifinal			Final
			1	Jamie Murphy	9
2	Stuart Thompson	5	2	Stuart Thompson	7
3	Brent MacDougall	4

=== Semifinal ===
Saturday, January 28, 2:00 pm

Team	1	2	3	4	5	6	7	8	9	10	Final
Stuart Thompson	0	2	1	1	0	0	1	0	0	0	5
Brent MacDougall	1	0	0	0	0	1	0	0	1	1	4

=== Final ===
Sunday, January 29, 10:00am

Team	1	2	3	4	5	6	7	8	9	10	11	Final
Jamie Murphy	2	0	2	0	1	0	1	0	1	0	2	9
Stuart Thompson	0	2	0	1	0	2	0	1	0	1	0	7

2017 Deloitte Tankard

Jamie Murphy
4th Nova Scotia Provincial Championship title
