= 2014 Molson Coors Tankard =

2014 Nova Scotia Men's Molson Coors Tankard Provincial Championship
- Host city: Halifax, Nova Scotia
- Arena: Halifax Curling Club
- Dates: February 5–9
- Winner: Jamie Murphy
- Curling club: Lakeshore CC, Lower Sackville
- Skip: Jamie Murphy
- Third: Jordan Pinder
- Second: Mike Bardsley
- Lead: Donal McDermaid
- Alternate: Kyle Schmeisser
- Coach: Alan Darragh
- Finalist: Mark Dacey

The 2014 Molson Coors Tankard, the Nova Scotia men's provincial curling championship, was held from February 5 to 9 at the Halifax Curling Club in Halifax, Nova Scotia. The winning team of Jamie Murphy represented Nova Scotia at the 2014 Tim Hortons Brier in Kamloops, British Columbia.

== Teams ==
Skip	Third	Second	Lead	Alternate	Locale
Peter Burgess	Craig Burgess	Jared Bent	Todd Burgess		Truro Curling Club, Truro
Mark Dacey	Stuart Thompson	Stephen Burgess	Andrew Gibson		Mayflower Curling Club, Halifax
Ian Fitzner-LeBlanc	Ian Juurrlink	Graham Breckon	Kelly Mittelstadt		Lakeshore Curling Club, Lower Sackville
Mark Kehoe	Glen MacLeod	Tyler Gamble	Pierre Fraser		Mayflower Curling Club, Halifax
John Luckhurst	Bryce Everist	Brendan Lavell	Brad Montgomery		Mayflower Curling Club, Halifax
Jamie Murphy	Jordan Pinder	Mike Bardsley	Donald McDermaid	Kyle Schmeisser	Lakeshore Curling Club, Lower Sackville
Chad Stevens	Cameron MacKenzie	Scott Saccary	Philip Crowell		Mayflower Curling Club, Halifax
Tom Sullivan	Stuart MacLean	Chris MacRae	Kerry MacLean	Travis Colter	Mayflower Curling Club, Halifax

== Round-robin standings ==
Final round-robin standings

Skip (Club)	W	L
Jamie Murphy (Lakeshore)	6	1
Mark Dacey (Mayflower)	5	2
Chad Stevens (Mayflower)	4	3
Mark Kehoe (Mayflower)	4	3
Ian Fitzner-Leblanc (Lakeshore)	3	4
John Luckhurst (Mayflower)	3	4
Tom Sullivan (Mayflower)	3	4
Peter Burgess (Truro)	0	7

== Round-robin results ==
=== Draw 1 ===
Wednesday, February 5, 1:00 p.m.

Sheet A	1	2	3	4	5	6	7	8	9	10	11	Final
Tom Sullivan 🔨	0	0	1	1	0	2	0	1	0	0	1	6
Peter Burgess	0	0	0	0	2	0	0	0	2	1	0	5

Sheet B	1	2	3	4	5	6	7	8	9	10	Final
Mark Kehoe 🔨	1	0	2	0	0	0	1	0	0	2	6
Jamie Murphy	0	1	0	1	1	0	0	2	0	0	5

Sheet C	1	2	3	4	5	6	7	8	9	10	Final
John Luckhurst 🔨	0	2	1	0	0	4	0	0	0	3	10
Chad Stevens	1	0	0	2	0	0	1	1	1	0	6

Sheet D	1	2	3	4	5	6	7	8	9	10	Final
Ian Fitzner-Leblanc	0	1	0	0	0	1	X	X	X	X	2
Mark Dacey 🔨	2	0	4	0	2	0	X	X	X	X	8

=== Draw 2 ===
Wednesday, February 5, 6:00 p.m.

Sheet A	1	2	3	4	5	6	7	8	9	10	Final
John Luckhurst	0	0	1	0	0	1	0	1	0	X	3
Jamie Murphy 🔨	1	0	0	2	1	0	2	0	1	X	7

Sheet B	1	2	3	4	5	6	7	8	9	10	Final
Ian Fitzner-Leblanc	0	0	0	1	0	1	0	2	0	0	4
Tom Sullivan 🔨	1	0	0	0	1	0	1	0	1	2	6

Sheet C	1	2	3	4	5	6	7	8	9	10	Final
Mark Dacey 🔨	3	0	2	1	1	0	3	X	X	X	10
Peter Burgess	0	1	0	0	0	2	0	X	X	X	3

Sheet D	1	2	3	4	5	6	7	8	9	10	Final
Chad Stevens	0	2	1	0	6	0	X	X	X	X	9
Mark Kehoe 🔨	1	0	0	1	0	1	X	X	X	X	3

=== Draw 3 ===
Thursday, February 6, 9:00 a.m.

Sheet A	1	2	3	4	5	6	7	8	9	10	Final
Peter Burgess 🔨	0	0	0	0	1	1	0	2	0	X	4
Ian Fitzner-Leblanc	1	0	1	3	0	0	1	0	1	X	7

Sheet B	1	2	3	4	5	6	7	8	9	10	Final
Jamie Murphy	1	0	2	0	2	0	0	2	2	X	9
Chad Stevens 🔨	0	2	0	1	0	2	0	0	0	X	5

Sheet C	1	2	3	4	5	6	7	8	9	10	Final
Mark Kehoe 🔨	1	0	2	2	0	0	1	0	3	X	9
John Luckhurst	0	2	0	0	2	0	0	1	0	X	5

Sheet D	1	2	3	4	5	6	7	8	9	10	Final
Mark Dacey	0	0	1	1	0	0	0	2	1	1	6
Tom Sullivan 🔨	0	2	0	0	0	1	0	0	0	0	3

=== Draw 4 ===
Thursday, February 6, 2:00 p.m.

Sheet A	1	2	3	4	5	6	7	8	9	10	Final
Mark Dacey 🔨	3	3	0	0	1	0	2	X	X	X	9
Mark Kehoe	0	0	1	0	0	2	0	X	X	X	3

Sheet B	1	2	3	4	5	6	7	8	9	10	Final
Tom Sullivan 🔨	2	1	0	0	6	X	X	X	X	X	9
John Luckhurst	0	0	1	0	0	X	X	X	X	X	1

Sheet C	1	2	3	4	5	6	7	8	9	10	Final
Jamie Murphy	0	0	0	1	2	0	0	2	0	X	5
Ian Fitzner-Leblanc 🔨	0	0	3	0	0	0	0	0	1	X	4

Sheet D	1	2	3	4	5	6	7	8	9	10	Final
Peter Burgess 🔨	0	1	0	1	0	1	0	2	0	X	5
Chad Stevens	2	0	2	0	1	0	3	0	3	X	11

=== Draw 5 ===
Thursday, February 6, 7:00 p.m.

Sheet A	1	2	3	4	5	6	7	8	9	10	Final
Ian Fitzner-Leblanc	1	0	0	1	0	1	0	1	1	0	5
John Luckhurst 🔨	0	0	2	0	1	0	2	0	0	1	6

Sheet B	1	2	3	4	5	6	7	8	9	10	Final
Peter Burgess	1	0	1	0	2	0	3	0	0	0	7
Mark Kehoe 🔨	0	2	0	1	0	2	0	1	1	1	8

Sheet C	1	2	3	4	5	6	7	8	9	10	Final
Chad Stevens	0	1	3	0	0	2	2	0	2	X	10
Mark Dacey 🔨	0	0	0	2	2	0	0	2	0	X	6

Sheet D	1	2	3	4	5	6	7	8	9	10	Final
Tom Sullivan 🔨	0	1	0	1	0	X	X	X	X	X	2
Jamie Murphy	0	0	6	0	2	X	X	X	X	X	8

=== Draw 6 ===
Friday, February 7, 2:00 p.m.

Sheet A	1	2	3	4	5	6	7	8	9	10	11	Final
Chad Stevens	0	0	1	1	0	0	0	1	1	0	1	5
Tom Sullivan 🔨	0	1	0	0	1	0	0	0	0	2	0	4

Sheet B	1	2	3	4	5	6	7	8	9	10	Final
John Luckhurst	1	0	0	0	1	0	2	0	1	0	5
Mark Dacey 🔨	0	0	0	1	0	2	0	2	0	1	6

Sheet C	1	2	3	4	5	6	7	8	9	10	Final
Peter Burgess 🔨	0	2	0	1	0	1	0	2	1	0	7
Jamie Murphy	0	0	3	0	3	0	2	0	0	3	11

Sheet D	1	2	3	4	5	6	7	8	9	10	Final
Mark Kehoe 🔨	0	2	0	0	1	0	1	0	2	0	6
Ian Fitzner-Leblanc	1	0	1	0	0	2	0	1	0	2	7

=== Draw 7 ===
Friday, February 7, 7:00 p.m.

Sheet A	1	2	3	4	5	6	7	8	9	10	Final
Jamie Murphy 🔨	2	0	2	0	2	0	X	X	X	X	6
Mark Dacey	0	1	0	1	0	1	X	X	X	X	3

Sheet B	1	2	3	4	5	6	7	8	9	10	Final
Chad Stevens	1	0	0	1	1	0	0	2	3	0	8
Ian Fitzner-Leblanc 🔨	0	2	3	0	0	1	1	0	0	2	9

Sheet C	1	2	3	4	5	6	7	8	9	10	Final
Tom Sullivan	0	0	2	1	0	0	1	0	0	X	4
Mark Kehoe 🔨	2	2	0	0	0	1	0	0	1	X	6

Sheet D	1	2	3	4	5	6	7	8	9	10	Final
John Luckhurst 🔨	0	0	4	0	1	0	2	0	2	2	11
Peter Burgess	1	0	0	2	0	2	0	3	0	0	8

== Playoffs ==
Page playoff system
1	Jamie Murphy	7
2	Mark Dacey	5
3	Chad Stevens	7
4	Mark Kehoe	5

Semifinal
2	Mark Dacey	8
3	Chad Stevens	6

Final
1	Jamie Murphy	12
2	Mark Dacey	8

=== 1 vs. 2 ===
Saturday, February 08, 2:00 p.m.

Team	1	2	3	4	5	6	7	8	9	10	Final
Jamie Murphy 🔨	2	0	0	0	1	0	0	2	0	2	7
Mark Dacey	0	2	0	0	0	1	0	0	2	0	5

=== 3 vs. 4 ===
Saturday, February 08, 2:00 p.m.

Team	1	2	3	4	5	6	7	8	9	10	Final
Chad Stevens 🔨	2	0	0	0	2	0	0	2	0	1	7
Mark Kehoe	0	0	0	1	0	2	0	0	2	0	5

=== Semifinal ===
Saturday, February 08, 7:00 p.m.

Team	1	2	3	4	5	6	7	8	9	10	11	Final
Mark Dacey 🔨	2	0	0	2	0	0	0	2	0	0	2	8
Chad Stevens	0	1	0	0	1	3	0	0	0	1	0	6

=== Final ===
Sunday, February 09, 2:00 p.m.

Team	1	2	3	4	5	6	7	8	9	10	Final
Jamie Murphy 🔨	4	1	0	2	0	1	0	1	0	3	12
Mark Dacey	0	0	2	0	2	0	2	0	2	0	8

2014 Molson Coors Tankard

Jamie Murphy
2nd Nova Scotia Provincial Championship title
