= Jordan Pinder =

Canadian curler

- Curler
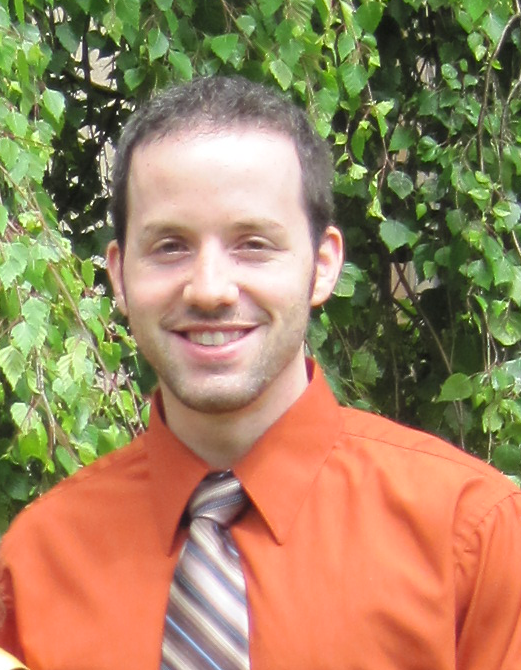
- Born: April 24, 1984 (age 42); Miramichi, New Brunswick

Curling career
- Member Association: Nova Scotia (2009–17); New Brunswick (2018–present)
- Brier: 5 (2012, 2014, 2016, 2017, 2019)

Jordan Pinder (born April 24, 1984) is a Canadian curler originally from New Brunswick. He now lives in Blockhouse, Nova Scotia.

== Career ==
Pinder's father encouraged him to start curling. He has been curling since the age of 14, starting in his hometown of Miramichi.

Pinder has been part of Jamie Murphy's team since 2009. Murphy's team had a notable 2010 season, losing in the semifinal of the Nova Scotia Men's Provincial Championship that year. In 2012 the team captured the provincial championship, defeating former Brier champion Mark Dacey. This earned Murphy's team their first trip to the Tim Horton's Brier. They would go on to win a total of 4 Nova Scotia Tankard titles in 2012, 2014, 2016, and 2017, before Pinder would move to New Brunswick in the 2018–19 curling season to join the Terry Odishaw rink.

In New Brunswick, Pinder and Team Odishaw would have a successful season, winning the 2019 NB Tankard and represent New Brunswick at the 2019 Tim Hortons Brier, Pinder's 5th appearance at the national championship. There they would finish with a 3–4 record, narrowly missing the championship round. Pinder would not return to the national level until the 2026 Canadian Mixed Curling Championship, where Pinder was the lead on a team skipped by Sylvie Quillian. They would make the final, but lose to Nova Scotia and finish in 2nd place.

== Personal life ==
Pinder is self employed as a photographer, and he is also a post-doctoral fellow at Dalhousie University in the Pathology department. He is married to Vanessa Surette and has two children.

== Teams ==
Season	Skip	Third	Second	Lead	Events
2009–10	Jamie Murphy	Jordan Pinder	Jon Wamback	Don McDermaid	2010 NS
2010–11	Jamie Murphy	Jordan Pinder	Kris Granchelli	Don McDermaid	2011 NS
2011–12	Jamie Murphy	Jordan Pinder	Mike Bardsley	Don McDermaid	2012 NS, Brier
2012–13	Jamie Murphy	Jordan Pinder	Mike Bardsley	Don McDermaid	2013 NS
2013–14	Jamie Murphy	Jordan Pinder	Mike Bardsley	Don McDermaid	2014 NS, Brier
2014–15	Jamie Murphy	Jordan Pinder	Scott Babin	Tyler Gamble	2015 NS
2015–16	Jamie Murphy	Jordan Pinder	Scott Saccary	Philip Crowell	2016 NS, Brier
2016–17	Jamie Murphy	Jordan Pinder	Scott Saccary	Philip Crowell	2017 NS, Brier
2018–19 (Note: Pinder was the alternate for Team Odishaw at the 2019 NB Tankard and played third at the 2019 Tim Hortons Brier, replacing Mike Kennedy.)	Terry Odishaw	Jordan Pinder	Marc LeCocq	Grant Odishaw	2019 NB, Brier
