= Curling at the 2011 Canada Winter Games =

2011 Canada Winter Games
- Host city: Halifax, Nova Scotia
- Arena: Mayflower Curling Club
- Dates: February 13–26
- Men's winner: Ontario
- Curling club: Annandale Country Club, Ajax, Ontario
- Skip: Ben Bevan
- Third: Carter Adair
- Second: Corey Gaudette
- Lead: Jake McGhee
- Finalist: Saskatchewan
- Women's winner: British Columbia
- Curling club: Kamloops CC, Kamloops, British Columbia
- Skip: Corryn Cecile Brown
- Third: Erin Pincott
- Second: Samantha Brianna Fisher
- Lead: Sydney Fraser
- Finalist: Alberta

Curling at the 2011 Canada Winter Games took place at the Mayflower Curling Club in Halifax, Nova Scotia.

The women's competition was held from February 13–18, ending with a win by British Columbia's Corryn Cecile Brown in a 3-1 victory over Alberta's Jocelyn Peterman. Ontario's Laura Horton won the bronze medal after defeating host Nova Scotia's Emily Dwyer. The men's competition, held from February 21–26, ended with a close 6-5 win by Ontario's Ben Bevan over Saskatchewan's Brady Scharback, while Manitoba's Kyle Doering secured a win over New Brunswick's Scott Babin.

== Medallists ==
Games	Gold	Silver	Bronze
Men	Ontario; Ben Bevan; Carter Adair; Corey Gaudette; Jake McGhee	Saskatchewan; Brady Scharback; Quinn Hersikorn; Jacob Hersikorn; Brady Kendel	Manitoba; Kyle Doering; Colton Lott; Derek Oryniak; Lucas Van Den Bosche
Women	British Columbia; Corryn Brown; Erin Pincott; Samantha Fisher; Sydney Fraser	Alberta; Jocelyn Peterman; Brittany Tran; Becca Konschuh; Kristine Anderson	Ontario; Lauren Horton; Andrea Sinclair; Cassandra Lewin; Jessica Armstrong

== Women ==
=== Teams ===
Pool	Province	Skip	Third	Second	Lead	Locale
A	Alberta	Jocelyn Peterman	Brittany Tran	Becca Konschuh	Kristine Anderson	Red Deer C.C., Red Deer
A	Newfoundland and Labrador	Carolyn Suley	Chloé Deaves	Charlotte Woolfrey	Heather Croke	Bally Haly G.&C.C., St. John's
A	Ontario	Lauren Horton	Andrea Sinclair	Cassandra Ashley Lewin	Jessica Armstrong	Huntley C.C., Carp, Ontario
A	Prince Edward Island	Amanda MacLean	Kassinda Bulger	Emily Gray	Aleya Quilty	Maple Leaf C.C., O'Leary
A	Quebec	Lisa Davies	Alison Davies	Meaghan Hamelin	Kelly Ryan	Glenmore C.C., Dollard-des-Ormeaux
A	Yukon	Sarah Koltun	Linea Eby	Jenna Duncan	Patty Wallingham	Whitehorse C.C., Whitehorse
B	British Columbia	Corryn Cecile Brown	Erin Pincott	Samantha Brianna Fisher	Sydney Fraser	Kamloops C.C., Kamloops
B	Manitoba	Beth Peterson	Robyn Njegovan	Melissa Gordon	Breanne Yozenko	Victoria C.C., Winnipeg
B	New Brunswick	Cathlia Ward	Jane DiCarlo	Katelyn Kelly	Katie Forward	Capital W.C., Fredericton
B	Northwest Territories	Taryn Williams	Janis O'Keefe	Paige Elkin	Katharine Cecelia Thomas	Yellowknife C.C., Yellowknife
B	Nova Scotia	Emily Dwyer	Amanda Colter	Katrina Mackinnon	Laura Kennedy	Mayflower C.C., Halifax
B	Saskatchewan	Rae-Ann Williamson	Callan Hamon	Amanda Kuzyk	Katherine Michaluk	Callie C.C., Regina

=== Standings ===
Pool A	W	L
Alberta	4	1
Ontario	4	1
Yukon	3	2
Prince Edward Island	2	3
Newfoundland and Labrador	1	4
Quebec	1	4

Pool B	W	L
British Columbia	4	1
Nova Scotia	4	1
Manitoba	2	3
New Brunswick	2	3
Northwest Territories	2	3
Saskatchewan	1	4

=== Round robin ===
==== Draw 1 ====
Sunday, February 13, 10:00

Sheet A	1	2	3	4	5	6	7	8	Final
Manitoba (Peterson)	0	0	0	1	1	0	1	0	3
New Brunswick (Ward)	2	1	1	0	0	2	0	2	8

Sheet B	1	2	3	4	5	6	7	8	Final
British Columbia (Brown)	1	1	1	0	2	1	0	X	6
Northwest Territories (Williams)	0	0	0	1	0	0	1	X	2

Sheet C	1	2	3	4	5	6	7	8	Final
Nova Scotia (Dwyer)	2	2	0	1	0	3	0	X	8
Saskatchewan (Williamson)	0	0	1	0	2	0	1	X	4

Sheet D	1	2	3	4	5	6	7	8	Final
Newfoundland and Labrador (Suley)	0	0	0	1	0	0	1	X	2
Ontario (Horton)	3	1	1	0	1	2	0	X	8

==== Draw 2 ====
Sunday, February 13, 14:30

Sheet A	1	2	3	4	5	6	7	8	Final
British Columbia (Brown)	2	0	0	2	1	0	0	1	6
Saskatchewan (Williamson)	0	3	0	0	0	1	1	0	5

Sheet B	1	2	3	4	5	6	7	8	Final
Alberta (Peterman)	1	1	0	4	0	4	0	X	10
Quebec (Davies)	0	0	2	0	2	0	1	X	5

Sheet C	1	2	3	4	5	6	7	8	9	Final
Prince Edward Island (MacLean)	0	2	1	0	2	0	0	0	0	5
Yukon (Koltun)	0	0	0	2	0	1	1	1	1	6

Sheet D	1	2	3	4	5	6	7	8	Final
New Brunswick (Ward)	1	0	0	0	1	0	2	0	4
Nova Scotia (Dwyer)	0	2	0	3	0	1	0	2	8

==== Draw 3 ====
Monday, February 14, 10:00

Sheet A	1	2	3	4	5	6	7	8	Final
Newfoundland and Labrador (Suley)	1	0	1	1	2	0	2	X	7
Quebec (Davies)	0	0	0	0	0	1	0	X	1

Sheet B	1	2	3	4	5	6	7	8	9	Final
Ontario (Horton)	2	0	1	0	0	0	2	0	1	6
Prince Edward Island (MacLean)	0	0	0	1	1	2	0	1	0	5

Sheet C	1	2	3	4	5	6	7	8	9	Final
Manitoba (Peterson)	2	0	0	2	0	1	0	1	0	6
Northwest Territories (Williams)	0	0	1	0	2	0	3	0	1	7

Sheet D	1	2	3	4	5	6	7	8	Final
Alberta (Peterman)	0	0	1	1	0	2	0	1	5
Yukon (Koltun)	0	0	0	0	1	0	2	0	3

==== Draw 4 ====
Monday, February 14, 14:30

Sheet A	1	2	3	4	5	6	7	8	Final
Northwest Territories (Williams)	0	1	0	0	2	0	0	X	3
Nova Scotia (Dwyer)	1	0	2	0	0	2	2	X	7

Sheet B	1	2	3	4	5	6	7	8	9	Final
New Brunswick (Ward)	0	0	1	1	2	0	0	2	0	6
Saskatchewan (Williamson)	3	1	0	0	0	1	1	0	1	7

Sheet D	1	2	3	4	5	6	7	8	Final
British Columbia (Brown)	1	0	2	0	1	1	0	1	6
Manitoba (Peterson)	0	1	0	1	0	0	2	0	4

==== Draw 5 ====
Tuesday, February 15, 10:00

Sheet B	1	2	3	4	5	6	7	8	Final
Manitoba (Peterson)	2	0	0	0	0	2	0	3	7
Nova Scotia (Dwyer)	0	0	0	1	1	0	1	0	3

Sheet C	1	2	3	4	5	6	7	8	9	Final
British Columbia (Brown)	3	0	0	0	1	0	0	0	2	6
New Brunswick (Ward)	0	0	0	1	0	1	1	1	0	4

Sheet D	1	2	3	4	5	6	7	8	Final
Northwest Territories (Williams)	0	0	3	0	0	1	0	4	8
Saskatchewan (Williamson)	1	1	0	2	1	0	2	0	7

==== Draw 6 ====
Tuesday, February 15, 14:30

Sheet A	1	2	3	4	5	6	7	8	Final
Alberta (Peterman)	1	0	2	0	0	4	1	X	8
Prince Edward Island (MacLean)	0	2	0	1	1	0	0	X	4

Sheet C	1	2	3	4	5	6	7	8	Final
Newfoundland and Labrador (Suley)	0	0	1	0	0	0	1	X	2
Yukon (Koltun)	0	2	0	1	1	1	0	X	5

Sheet D	1	2	3	4	5	6	7	8	Final
Ontario (Horton)	2	0	0	3	0	1	0	X	6
Quebec (Davies)	0	0	1	0	1	0	2	X	4

==== Draw 7 ====
Wednesday, February 16, 10:00

Sheet A	1	2	3	4	5	6	7	8	Final
Ontario (Horton)	1	0	0	0	0	0	1	0	2
Yukon (Koltun)	0	0	0	0	2	2	0	1	5

Sheet B	1	2	3	4	5	6	7	8	Final
Alberta (Peterman)	2	0	2	0	4	1	X	X	9
Newfoundland and Labrador (Suley)	0	1	0	1	0	0	X	X	2

Sheet C	1	2	3	4	5	6	7	8	9	Final
Prince Edward Island (MacLean)	2	0	1	1	0	1	1	0	2	8
Quebec (Davies)	0	2	0	0	3	0	0	1	0	6

==== Draw 8 ====
Wednesday, February 16, 14:30

Sheet A	1	2	3	4	5	6	7	8	Final
British Columbia (Brown)	1	0	0	1	0	0	0	2	4
Nova Scotia (Dwyer)	0	1	0	0	1	1	2	0	5

Sheet B	1	2	3	4	5	6	7	8	Final
New Brunswick (Ward)	0	3	0	3	0	2	1	X	9
Northwest Territories (Williams)	1	0	1	0	1	0	0	X	3

Sheet C	1	2	3	4	5	6	7	8	Final
Manitoba (Peterson)	0	3	0	0	2	0	0	2	7
Saskatchewan (Williamson)	2	0	1	1	0	0	1	0	5

==== Draw 9 ====
Wednesday, February 16, 19:30

Sheet B	1	2	3	4	5	6	7	8	9	Final
Quebec (Davies)	2	0	0	1	2	0	0	0	2	7
Yukon (Koltun)	0	0	1	0	0	1	1	2	0	5

Sheet C	1	2	3	4	5	6	7	8	Final
Alberta (Peterman)	0	0	0	2	0	1	0	X	3
Ontario (Horton)	0	0	2	0	2	0	1	X	5

Sheet D	1	2	3	4	5	6	7	8	Final
Newfoundland and Labrador (Suley)	0	0	1	2	0	2	0	0	5
Prince Edward Island (MacLean)	2	1	0	0	2	0	1	1	7

=== Crossover ===
Thursday, February 17, 19:30

Sheet A	1	2	3	4	5	6	7	8	Final
Manitoba (Peterson)	0	0	2	0	0	5	0	X	7
Newfoundland and Labrador (Suley)	0	0	0	2	0	0	1	X	3

Sheet B	1	2	3	4	5	6	7	8	Final
New Brunswick (Ward)	0	0	0	0	1	0	X	X	1
Yukon (Koltun)	0	2	1	1	0	2	X	X	6

Sheet C	1	2	3	4	5	6	7	8	Final
Northwest Territories (Williams)	0	1	0	0	1	0	0	X	2
Prince Edward Island (MacLean)	1	0	2	2	0	2	1	X	8

Sheet D	1	2	3	4	5	6	7	8	Final
Quebec (Davies)	0	0	2	0	1	0	1	X	4
Saskatchewan (Williamson)	3	1	0	2	0	1	0	X	7

=== Playoffs ===
Semifinal
A1	Alberta	8
B2	Nova Scotia	4
B1	British Columbia	4
A2	Ontario	1

Final
A1	Alberta	1
B1	British Columbia	3
Bronze Medal Game
B2	Nova Scotia	2
A2	Ontario	6

==== Semifinals ====
Friday, February 18, 10:00

Team	1	2	3	4	5	6	7	8	Final
Alberta (Peterman)	0	0	1	0	4	0	3	X	8
Nova Scotia (Dwyer)	1	0	0	2	0	1	0	X	4

Team	1	2	3	4	5	6	7	8	Final
British Columbia (Brown)	0	0	1	0	2	0	1	X	4
Ontario (Horton)	0	0	0	1	0	0	0	X	1

==== Bronze Medal Game ====
Friday, February 18, 14:30

Team	1	2	3	4	5	6	7	8	Final
Nova Scotia (Dwyer)	0	1	0	1	0	0	0	0	2
Ontario (Horton)	1	0	1	0	2	1	1	0	6

==== Gold Medal Game ====
Friday, February 18, 19:30

Team	1	2	3	4	5	6	7	8	Final
Alberta (Peterman)	0	0	0	0	0	1	0	X	1
British Columbia (Brown)	0	0	1	0	0	0	2	X	3

=== Final standings ===
Province	Rank
British Columbia	1st place, gold medalist(s)
Alberta	2nd place, silver medalist(s)
Ontario	3rd place, bronze medalist(s)
Nova Scotia	4
Yukon	5
New Brunswick	6
Prince Edward Island	7
Northwest Territories	8
Manitoba	9
Newfoundland and Labrador	10
Saskatchewan	11
Quebec	12

== Men ==
=== Teams ===
Pool	Province	Skip	Third	Second	Lead	Locale
A	New Brunswick	Scott Babin	Avery Hughson	Spencer Watts	Michael Prince	Dalhousie Legion C.C., Dalhousie
A	Northwest Territories	David Aho	Daniel Murray	Matt Miller	Kent Nilson	Yellowknife C.C., Yellowknife
A	Nova Scotia	Robert Mayhew	Nick Burdock	Dillon Michael O'Leary	Eric Sampson	Lakeshore C.C., Lower Sackville
A	Prince Edward Island	Tyler Smith	Parker O'Connor	Noah O'Connor	Shawn Pitre	Silver Fox C&YC, Summerside
A	Quebec	Chris Bushey	Maxime Charland	Gabriel Bélisle	Greg Bornais	C.C. Trois-Rivières / Danville C.C., Trois-Rivières & Danville
A	Saskatchewan	Brady Scharback	Quinn Hersikorn	Jacob Hersikorn	Brady Kendel	Granite C.C., Saskatoon
B	Alberta	Mike Roy	Taylor Ardiel	Geoff Nicholson	Mac Lenton	Calgary W.C., Calgary
B	British Columbia	Daniel Wenzek	Nolan Reid	Max Langlais	Calvin Arthur Heels	Victoria C.C., Victoria
B	Manitoba	Kyle Doering	Colton Lott	Derek Oryniak	Lucas Van Den Bosche	West Kildonan C.C., Winnipeg
B	Newfoundland and Labrador	Stephen Trickett	Adam Boland	Grant Maddigan	Zach Young	St. John's C.C., St. John's
B	Ontario	Ben Bevan	Carter Adair	Corey Gaudette	Jake McGhee	Annandale C.C., Ajax
B	Yukon	Thomas Scoffin	Andrew Scoffin	Kurtis Hills	Michael Hare	Whitehorse C.C., Whitehorse

=== Standings ===
Pool A	W	L
New Brunswick	4	1
Saskatchewan	4	1
Nova Scotia	3	2
Quebec	2	3
Northwest Territories	1	4
Prince Edward Island	1	4

Pool B	W	L
Manitoba	4	1
Ontario	4	1
Alberta	2	3
British Columbia	2	3
Newfoundland and Labrador	2	3
Yukon	1	4

=== Round robin ===
==== Draw 1 ====
Monday, February 21, 10:00

Sheet A	1	2	3	4	5	6	7	8	Final
Nova Scotia (Mayhew)	0	2	0	2	0	1	1	X	6
Prince Edward Island (Smith)	1	0	1	0	0	0	0	X	2

Sheet B	1	2	3	4	5	6	7	8	Final
Northwest Territories (Aho)	0	1	0	0	0	1	1	X	3
Quebec (Bushey)	2	0	2	2	2	0	0	X	8

Sheet C	1	2	3	4	5	6	7	8	Final
New Brunswick (Babin)	0	1	1	0	2	1	0	X	6
Saskatchewan (Scharback)	0	0	0	2	0	0	0	X	2

Sheet D	1	2	3	4	5	6	7	8	Final
British Columbia (Wenzek)	0	1	0	1	0	2	0	X	4
Ontario (Bevan)	2	0	1	0	4	0	1	X	8

==== Draw 2 ====
Monday, February 21, 14:30

Sheet A	1	2	3	4	5	6	7	8	Final
Quebec (Bushey)	0	1	0	0	0	2	0	X	3
Saskatchewan (Scharback)	3	0	2	0	2	0	1	X	8

Sheet B	1	2	3	4	5	6	7	8	Final
Alberta (Roy)	2	0	3	3	0	4	X	X	12
Newfoundland and Labrador (Trickett)	0	3	0	0	2	0	X	X	5

Sheet C	1	2	3	4	5	6	7	8	Final
Manitoba (Doering)	0	1	0	0	0	1	1	X	3
Yukon (Scoffin)	1	0	2	1	2	0	0	X	6

Sheet D	1	2	3	4	5	6	7	8	9	Final
New Brunswick (Babin)	0	0	0	2	0	2	1	0	1	6
Nova Scotia (Mayhew)	1	1	1	0	1	0	0	1	0	5

==== Draw 3 ====
Tuesday, February 22, 10:00

Sheet A	1	2	3	4	5	6	7	8	Final
British Columbia (Wenzek)	0	0	1	0	1	0	0	0	2
Newfoundland and Labrador (Trickett)	1	0	0	2	0	0	1	1	5

Sheet B	1	2	3	4	5	6	7	8	Final
Manitoba (Doering)	2	1	0	6	0	0	2	X	11
Ontario (Bevan)	0	0	1	0	3	1	0	X	5

Sheet C	1	2	3	4	5	6	7	8	Final
Northwest Territories (Aho)	1	0	1	0	1	2	0	X	5
Prince Edward Island (Smith)	0	0	0	1	0	0	1	X	2

Sheet D	1	2	3	4	5	6	7	8	Final
Alberta (Roy)	2	2	1	0	1	0	0	0	6
Yukon (Scoffin)	0	0	0	1	0	2	1	1	5

==== Draw 4 ====
Tuesday, February 22, 14:30

Sheet A	1	2	3	4	5	6	7	8	Final
New Brunswick (Babin)	1	0	1	0	1	0	0	3	6
Northwest Territories (Aho)	0	0	0	1	0	0	2	0	3

Sheet B	1	2	3	4	5	6	7	8	Final
Nova Scotia (Mayhew)	0	0	0	0	1	0	X	X	1
Saskatchewan (Scharback)	2	1	1	2	0	2	X	X	8

Sheet D	1	2	3	4	5	6	7	8	Final
Prince Edward Island (Smith)	0	0	0	3	3	4	X	X	10
Quebec (Bushey)	2	0	1	0	0	0	X	X	3

==== Draw 5 ====
Wednesday, February 23, 10:00

Sheet A	1	2	3	4	5	6	7	8	9	Final
Alberta (Roy)	1	0	0	2	0	1	0	2	0	6
Manitoba (Doering)	0	1	1	0	1	0	3	0	1	7

Sheet C	1	2	3	4	5	6	7	8	Final
British Columbia (Wenzek)	0	3	1	0	0	3	0	1	8
Yukon (Scoffin)	3	0	0	1	1	0	2	0	7

Sheet D	1	2	3	4	5	6	7	8	Final
Newfoundland and Labrador (Trickett)	0	0	0	1	0	1	0	X	2
Ontario (Bevan)	0	1	1	0	1	0	2	X	5

==== Draw 6 ====
Wednesday, February 23, 14:30

Sheet B	1	2	3	4	5	6	7	8	Final
New Brunswick (Babin)	2	0	3	0	2	1	X	X	8
Prince Edward Island (Smith)	0	1	0	1	0	0	X	X	2

Sheet C	1	2	3	4	5	6	7	8	Final
Nova Scotia (Mayhew)	1	0	1	0	0	0	1	1	4
Quebec (Bushey)	0	1	0	0	0	1	0	0	2

Sheet D	1	2	3	4	5	6	7	8	Final
Northwest Territories (Aho)	0	1	0	0	0	0	X	X	1
Saskatchewan (Scharback)	2	0	2	2	2	2	X	X	10

==== Draw 7 ====
Thursday, February 24, 10:00

Sheet A	1	2	3	4	5	6	7	8	Final
Ontario (Bevan)	0	1	1	1	2	4	X	X	9
Yukon (Scoffin)	0	0	0	0	0	0	X	X	0

Sheet B	1	2	3	4	5	6	7	8	9	Final
Alberta (Roy)	0	2	0	1	1	0	0	1	0	5
British Columbia (Wenzek)	0	0	2	0	0	2	1	0	2	7

Sheet C	1	2	3	4	5	6	7	8	Final
Manitoba (Doering)	0	1	1	0	0	2	0	X	4
Newfoundland and Labrador (Trickett)	1	0	0	1	0	0	1	X	3

==== Draw 8 ====
Thursday, February 24, 14:30

Sheet A	1	2	3	4	5	6	7	8	Final
New Brunswick (Babin)	1	0	0	0	2	0	2	0	5
Quebec (Bushey)	0	0	0	1	0	3	0	2	6

Sheet B	1	2	3	4	5	6	7	8	9	Final
Northwest Territories (Aho)	0	0	2	0	0	0	1	1	0	4
Nova Scotia (Mayhew)	0	2	0	1	0	1	0	0	1	5

Sheet C	1	2	3	4	5	6	7	8	Final
Prince Edward Island (Smith)	0	0	0	0	1	0	X	X	1
Saskatchewan (Scharback)	2	1	1	1	0	2	X	X	7

==== Draw 9 ====
Thursday, February 24, 19:30

Sheet B	1	2	3	4	5	6	7	8	Final
Newfoundland and Labrador (Trickett)	1	0	3	0	3	0	3	X	10
Yukon (Scoffin)	0	1	0	1	0	1	0	X	3

Sheet C	1	2	3	4	5	6	7	8	9	Final
Alberta (Roy)	0	0	0	1	1	0	1	1	0	4
Ontario (Bevan)	0	0	3	0	0	1	0	0	1	5

Sheet D	1	2	3	4	5	6	7	8	Final
British Columbia (Wenzek)	1	1	0	1	1	0	0	X	4
Manitoba (Doering)	0	0	2	0	0	1	5	X	8

=== Crossover ===
Friday, February 25, 19:30

Sheet A	1	2	3	4	5	6	7	8	9	Final
Newfoundland and Labrador (Trickett)	0	0	3	0	0	3	0	2	1	9
Northwest Territories (Aho)	1	2	0	0	2	0	3	0	0	8

Sheet B	1	2	3	4	5	6	7	8	Final
Alberta (Roy)	0	0	2	0	1	0	0	0	3
Nova Scotia (Mayhew)	0	1	0	2	0	0	0	1	4

Sheet C	1	2	3	4	5	6	7	8	9	Final
British Columbia (Wenzek)	2	0	0	2	0	0	0	1	0	5
Quebec (Bushey)	0	0	1	0	2	0	2	0	1	6

Sheet D	1	2	3	4	5	6	7	8	Final
Prince Edward Island (Smith)	0	0	0	0	0	7	X	X	7
Yukon (Scoffin)	0	0	0	1	0	0	X	X	1

=== Playoffs ===
Semifinal
A1	New Brunswick	2
B2	Ontario	5
B1	Manitoba	2
A2	Saskatchewan	9

Final
B2	Ontario	6
A2	Saskatchewan	5
Bronze Medal Game
A1	New Brunswick	3
B2	Manitoba	6

==== Semifinals ====
Saturday, February 26, 10:00

Sheet A	1	2	3	4	5	6	7	8	Final
New Brunswick (Babin)	0	0	1	0	0	0	1	0	2
Ontario (Bevan)	0	2	0	0	0	2	0	1	5

Sheet D	1	2	3	4	5	6	7	8	Final
Manitoba (Doering)	0	1	0	0	1	0	X	X	2
Saskatchewan (Scharback)	1	0	1	3	0	4	X	X	9

==== Bronze Medal Game ====
Saturday, February 26, 14:30

Team	1	2	3	4	5	6	7	8	Final
New Brunswick (Babin)	0	3	0	0	0	0	0	X	3
Manitoba (Doering)	1	0	2	1	0	1	1	X	6

==== Gold Medal Game ====
Saturday, February 26, 19:30

Team	1	2	3	4	5	6	7	8	Final
Ontario (Bevan)	1	0	2	0	1	0	0	2	6
Saskatchewan (Scharback)	0	2	0	1	0	2	0	0	5

=== Final standings ===
Province	Rank
Ontario	1st place, gold medalist(s)
Saskatchewan	2nd place, silver medalist(s)
Manitoba	3rd place, bronze medalist(s)
New Brunswick	4
Nova Scotia	5
Alberta	6
Quebec	7
British Columbia	8
Newfoundland and Labrador	9
Northwest Territories	10
Prince Edward Island	11
Yukon	12
