= 2011 Nova Scotia Men's Molson Provincial Championship =

- Host city: Dartmouth, Nova Scotia
- Arena: Dartmouth Curling Club
- Dates: February 1–6
- Winner: Team Adams
- Curling club: Mayflower CC, Halifax
- Skip: Shawn Adams
- Third: Paul Flemming
- Second: Andrew Gibson
- Lead: Kelly Mittelstadt
- Finalist: Steve Ogden

The 2011 Nova Scotia Men's Molson Provincial Championship was held February 1–6 at the Dartmouth Curling Club in Dartmouth, Nova Scotia. The winning team of Shawn Adams represented Nova Scotia at the 2011 Tim Hortons Brier in London, Ontario.

== Teams ==
Skip	Third	Second	Lead	Club(s)
Shawn Adams	Paul Flemming	Andrew Gibson	Kelly Mittelstadt	Mayflower Curling Club, Halifax
Peter Burgess	Craig Burgess	Jared Bent	Todd Burgess	Truro Curling Club, Truro
Mark Dacey	Tom Sullivan	Lee Buott	Travis Colter	Mayflower Curling Club, Halifax
Ian Fitzner-Leblanc	Stuart MacLean	Kent Smith	Paul Crowel	Mayflower Curling Club, Halifax
Mark Kehoe	Curt Palmer	Ian Juurlink	Richard Barker	Windsor Curling Club, Windsor
John Luckhurst	Luke Evans	Bryce Everist	Tuan Bui	Mayflower Curling Club, Halifax
Brent MacDougall	Paul Dexter	Chris Emeneau	Peter Ross	Mayflower Curling Club, Halifax
Doug MacKenzie	Mike Bardsley	Ryan Garven	Kyle Schmeisser	Mayflower Curling Club, Halifax
Jamie Murphy	Jordan Pinder	Kris Granchelli	Donald McDermaid	Mayflower Curling Club, Halifax
Ken Myers	Alan O'Leary	Kevin Lonergran	Harold McCarthy	Mayflower Curling Club, Halifax
Steve Ogden	Peter MacPhee	Paul Arbuckle	Tom Sephton	Mayflower Curling Club, Halifax
Mark Robar	Jeff Dawson	Dana Seward	Kirk MacDairmid	Mayflower Curling Club, Halifax
Mike Robinson	Alan Darragh	Dave Slauenwhite	Glenn Josephson	Dartmouth Curling Club, Dartmouth
Chad Stevens	Graham Brekon	Scott Saccary	Kevin Saccary	Dartmouth Curling Club, Dartmouth
Chris Sutherland	Adam Casey	Glen MacLeod	Kevin Ouellette	Mayflower Curling Club, Halifax
Aaron Sweeney	Colin Fraser	Doug Bryant	Cluny Nichols	Yarmouth Curling Club, Yarmouth

== Draw Brackets ==
=== A Event ===
Round of 16
Fitzner-Leblanc	7
Dacey	5
Kehoe	2
Burgess	8
Sutherland	8
Sweeney	5
Murphy	8
Robinson	6
Adams	5
Ogden	8
MacKenzie	5
Robar	6
MacDougall	5
Myers	6
Stevens	8
Luckhurst	1

Quarter-finals
Fitzner-Leblanc	9
Burgess	8
Sutherland	10
Murphy	4
Ogden	4
Robar	11
Myers	8
Stevens	7

Semi-finals
Fitzner-Leblanc	8
Sutherland	2
Robar	3
Myers	4

A Qualifier Match
Fitzner-Leblanc	6
Myers	3

=== B Event ===
Round of 16
Sweeney	5
Robinson	9
Adams	9
MacKenzie	3

Quarterfinals
Burgess	7
Robinson	6
Stevens	5
Adams	9

Semifinals
Robar	4
Burgess	7
Sutherland	6
Adams	9

Finals
Burgess	6
Adams	3

Round of 16
Dacey	7
Kehoe	5
MacDougall	8
Luckhurst	5

Quarterfinals
Murphy	7
Dacey	8
Ogden	6
MacDougall	4

Semifinals
Dacey	3
Ogden	5

Finals
Myers	3
Ogden	4
B Qualifier Match
Burgess	4
Ogden	9

=== C Event ===
Quarterfinals
Robinson	8
Stevens	4
Murphy	8
MacDougall	3

Semifinals
Myers	2
Robinson	9
Adams	8
Murphy	6

C Qualifier Match
Robinson	3
Adams	4

Round of 16
Sweeney	2
Kehoe	5
MacKenzie	8
Luckhurst	9

Quarterfinals
Kehoe	10
Luckhurst	5

Semifinals
Robar	6
Sutherland	5
Dacey	8
Kehoe	3

Finals
Robar	8
Dacey	11
C Qualifier Match
Burgess	9
Dacey	7

== Results ==
- All times AST

=== Draw 1 ===
February 2, 9:00am

Sheet B	1	2	3	4	5	6	7	8	9	10	Final
Mark Dacey	0	1	1	0	0	1	0	0	2	0	5
Ian Fitzner-Leblanc	1	0	0	0	2	0	2	1	0	1	7

Sheet C	1	2	3	4	5	6	7	8	9	10	Final
Mark Kehoe	0	0	1	0	1	0	0	X	X	X	2
Peter Burgess	1	1	0	3	0	1	2	X	X	X	8

Sheet D	1	2	3	4	5	6	7	8	9	10	Final
Chris Sutherland	0	3	1	0	0	3	0	1	0	X	8
Aaron Sweeney	1	0	0	1	0	0	2	0	1	X	5

Sheet E	1	2	3	4	5	6	7	8	9	10	Final
Jamie Murphy	0	2	2	0	2	0	0	0	2	X	8
Mike Robinson	1	0	0	3	0	1	0	1	0	X	6

=== Draw 2 ===
February 2, 2:00pm

Sheet B	1	2	3	4	5	6	7	8	9	10	Final
Shawn Adams	0	1	0	1	1	1	0	1	0	X	5
Steve Ogden	2	0	2	0	0	0	1	0	3	X	8

Sheet C	1	2	3	4	5	6	7	8	9	10	11	Final
Doug MacKenzie	1	0	0	0	2	1	0	0	0	1	0	5
Mark Robar	0	1	1	0	0	0	2	1	0	0	1	6

Sheet D	1	2	3	4	5	6	7	8	9	10	Final
Brent MacDougall	1	0	0	1	0	1	0	1	1	0	5
Ken Myers	0	0	0	0	3	0	2	0	0	1	6

Sheet E	1	2	3	4	5	6	7	8	9	10	Final
Chad Stevens	1	1	1	1	0	2	1	1	X	X	8
John Luckhurst	0	0	0	0	1	0	0	0	X	X	1

=== Draw 3 ===
February 3, 10:00am

Sheet B	1	2	3	4	5	6	7	8	9	10	Final
Ian Fitzner-Leblanc	1	0	2	0	2	3	0	1	0	0	9
Peter Burgess	0	2	0	1	0	0	2	0	2	1	8

Sheet C	1	2	3	4	5	6	7	8	9	10	Final
Aaron Sweeney	1	0	1	1	1	0	1	0	0	X	5
Mike Robinson	0	4	0	0	0	4	0	0	1	X	9

Sheet D	1	2	3	4	5	6	7	8	9	10	Final
Mark Dacey	1	0	3	0	2	0	1	0	0	X	7
Mark Kehoe	0	1	0	1	0	1	0	1	1	X	5

Sheet E	1	2	3	4	5	6	7	8	9	10	Final
Chris Sutherland	1	1	0	0	3	0	1	0	4	X	10
Jamie Murphy	0	0	2	0	0	1	0	1	0	X	4

=== Draw 4 ===
February 3, 3:00pm

Sheet B	1	2	3	4	5	6	7	8	9	10	11	Final
Ken Myers	0	0	1	1	0	0	3	2	0	0	1	8
Chad Stevens	0	3	0	0	1	0	0	0	2	1	0	7

Sheet C	1	2	3	4	5	6	7	8	9	10	Final
Brent MacDougall	4	0	0	1	0	1	0	1	1	X	8
John Luckhurst	0	2	2	0	0	0	1	0	0	X	5

Sheet D	1	2	3	4	5	6	7	8	9	10	Final
Shawn Adams	0	3	0	0	2	0	2	2	X	X	9
Doug MacKenzie	1	0	1	0	0	1	0	0	X	X	3

Sheet E	1	2	3	4	5	6	7	8	9	10	Final
Steve Ogden	0	0	2	0	0	2	0	0	X	X	4
Mark Robar	1	3	0	2	1	0	2	2	X	X	11

=== Draw 5 ===
February 3, 8:00pm

Sheet B	1	2	3	4	5	6	7	8	9	10	Final
Aaron Sweeney	1	0	0	1	X	X	X	X	X	X	2
Mark Kehoe	0	3	2	0	X	X	X	X	X	X	5

Sheet C	1	2	3	4	5	6	7	8	9	10	Final
Ian Fitzner-Leblanc	0	3	3	0	2	0	X	X	X	X	8
Chris Sutherland	0	0	0	1	0	1	X	X	X	X	2

Sheet D	1	2	3	4	5	6	7	8	9	10	11	Final
Peter Burgess	0	0	0	0	2	0	0	4	0	0	1	7
Mike Robinson	0	1	1	1	0	0	2	0	0	1	0	6

Sheet E	1	2	3	4	5	6	7	8	9	10	11	Final
Jamie Murphy	0	1	0	1	0	1	0	2	0	2	0	7
Mark Dacey	3	0	1	0	1	0	2	0	0	0	1	8

=== Draw 6 ===
February 4, 7:30am

Sheet B	1	2	3	4	5	6	7	8	9	10	11	Final
Doug MacKenzie	0	1	2	0	2	0	0	2	1	0	0	8
John Luckhurst	2	0	0	1	0	0	2	0	0	3	1	9

Sheet C	1	2	3	4	5	6	7	8	9	10	Final
Mark Robar	0	1	0	1	0	0	0	1	0	0	3
Ken Myers	0	0	0	0	2	1	1	0	0	0	4

Sheet D	1	2	3	4	5	6	7	8	9	10	Final
Steve Ogden	0	0	2	0	1	0	1	1	1	X	6
Brent MacDougall	1	1	0	1	0	1	0	0	0	X	4

Sheet E	1	2	3	4	5	6	7	8	9	10	Final
Chad Stevens	0	1	0	0	1	2	0	1	0	X	5
Shawn Adams	3	0	1	2	0	0	1	0	2	X	9

=== Draw 7 ===
February 4, 12:30pm

Sheet B	1	2	3	4	5	6	7	8	9	10	Final
Jamie Murphy	0	1	0	2	3	1	0	1	X	X	8
Brent MacDougall	1	0	1	0	0	0	1	0	X	X	3

Sheet C	1	2	3	4	5	6	7	8	9	10	Final
Mike Robinson	0	2	0	0	0	0	3	0	1	2	8
Chad Stevens	2	0	1	0	0	0	0	1	0	0	4

Sheet D	1	2	3	4	5	6	7	8	9	10	Final
Chris Sutherland	0	2	0	1	0	1	0	2	0	X	6
Shawn Adams	2	0	2	0	3	0	1	0	1	X	9

Sheet E	1	2	3	4	5	6	7	8	9	10	Final
Peter Burgess	2	3	0	0	0	2	0	X	X	X	7
Mark Robar	0	0	0	2	1	0	1	X	X	X	4

=== Draw 8 ===
February 4, 5:15pm

Sheet B	1	2	3	4	5	6	7	8	9	10	Final
Mark Dacey	2	0	0	0	0	0	1	0	0	0	3
Steve Ogden	0	1	0	0	1	1	0	1	0	1	5

Sheet C	1	2	3	4	5	6	7	8	9	10	Final
Mark Kehoe	0	2	0	0	1	1	0	3	3	X	10
John Luckhurst	1	0	2	0	0	0	2	0	0	X	5

Sheet D	1	2	3	4	5	6	7	8	9	10	Final
Ian Fitzner-Leblanc	2	0	0	0	1	0	1	1	1	X	6
Ken Myers	0	1	1	0	0	1	0	0	0	X	3

=== Draw 9 ===
February 4, 9:00pm

Sheet B	1	2	3	4	5	6	7	8	9	10	11	Final
Mark Robar	0	1	1	0	1	0	1	0	1	0	1	6
Chris Sutherland	1	0	0	1	0	1	0	1	0	1	0	5

Sheet C	1	2	3	4	5	6	7	8	9	10	Final
Peter Burgess	0	0	2	0	1	1	0	1	1	X	6
Shawn Adams	2	0	0	0	0	0	1	0	0	X	3

Sheet D	1	2	3	4	5	6	7	8	9	10	Final
Mark Kehoe	0	1	0	0	0	0	2	0	X	X	3
Mark Dacey	1	0	2	1	1	0	0	3	X	X	8

Sheet E	1	2	3	4	5	6	7	8	9	10	Final
Ken Myers	2	0	0	0	1	0	0	0	0	0	3
Steve Ogden	0	2	0	0	0	0	0	0	1	1	4

=== Draw 10 ===
February 5, 10:00am

Sheet B	1	2	3	4	5	6	7	8	9	10	Final
Mike Robinson	0	2	0	4	3	X	X	X	X	X	9
Ken Myers	1	0	1	0	0	X	X	X	X	X	2

Sheet C	1	2	3	4	5	6	7	8	9	10	Final
Mark Dacey	0	2	0	0	3	1	0	4	1	X	11
Mark Robar	1	0	2	3	0	0	2	0	0	X	8

Sheet D	1	2	3	4	5	6	7	8	9	10	Final
Peter Burgess	1	0	2	0	1	0	0	0	0	X	4
Steve Ogden	0	2	0	1	0	1	1	3	1	X	9

Sheet E	1	2	3	4	5	6	7	8	9	10	Final
Shawn Adams	1	0	2	0	1	0	0	3	0	1	8
Jamie Murphy	0	1	0	1	0	1	1	0	2	0	6

=== Draw 11 ===
February 5, 3:00pm

Sheet C	1	2	3	4	5	6	7	8	9	10	11	Final
Mike Robinson	1	0	0	1	0	0	0	0	0	1	0	3
Shawn Adams	0	2	0	0	0	0	0	1	0	0	1	4

Sheet E	1	2	3	4	5	6	7	8	9	10	Final
Peter Burgess	1	0	1	1	1	0	2	2	0	1	9
Mark Dacey	0	4	0	0	0	1	0	0	2	0	7

== Playoffs ==
Page playoff system
1	Ian Fitzner-Leblanc	5
2	Steve Ogden	10
3	Peter Burgess	5
4	Shawn Adams	6

Semifinal
1	Ian Fitzner-Leblanc	5
4	Shawn Adams	7

Final
2	Steve Ogden	5
4	Shawn Adams	7

=== 1 vs. 2 ===
February 5, 8:00pm

Sheet C	1	2	3	4	5	6	7	8	9	10	Final
Ian Fitzner-Leblanc	0	2	0	1	0	0	2	0	0	X	5
Steve Ogden	2	0	1	0	1	1	0	4	1	X	10

=== 3 vs. 4 ===
February 5, 8:00pm

Sheet D	1	2	3	4	5	6	7	8	9	10	Final
Peter Burgess	0	1	1	1	1	0	0	1	0	0	5
Shawn Adams	2	0	0	0	0	2	1	0	0	1	6

=== Semifinal ===
February 6, 9:00am

Sheet C	1	2	3	4	5	6	7	8	9	10	Final
Ian Fitzner-Leblanc	0	0	0	1	1	1	1	0	1	0	5
Shawn Adams	1	1	3	0	0	0	0	1	0	1	7

=== Final ===
February 6, 2:00pm

Sheet C	1	2	3	4	5	6	7	8	9	10	Final
Steve Ogden	0	1	0	1	0	2	0	0	1	0	5
Shawn Adams	0	0	2	0	2	0	0	2	0	1	7
