= 2016 East Coast Credit Union Tankard =

- Host city: Halifax, Nova Scotia
- Arena: Mayflower Curling Club
- Dates: January 19–24
- Winner: Jamie Murphy
- Curling club: Mayflower CC, Halifax
- Skip: Jamie Murphy
- Third: Jordan Pinder
- Second: Scott Saccary
- Lead: Phil Crowell
- Alternate: Bruce Lohnes
- Finalist: Chad Stevens

The 2016 East Coast Credit Union Tankard, the provincial men's curling championship of Nova Scotia, was held from January 19 to 24 at the Mayflower Curling Club in Halifax. The winning Jamie Murphy team represented Nova Scotia at the 2016 Tim Hortons Brier in Ottawa.

== Teams ==
Teams are as follows:

Skip	Third	Second	Lead	Alternate	Club(s)
Shawn Adams	Mark Dacey	Ian Fitzner-Leblanc	Andrew Gibson		Mayflower Curling Club, Halifax
Jamie Danbrook	Kendal Thompson	Bryce Everist	Brendan Lavell		Halifax Curling Club, Halifax
Paul Dexter	Paul Buott	Mark Robar	Tommy Bragnalo		Mayflower Curling Club, Halifax
Brent MacDougall	Kevin Ouellette	Kris Granchelli	Rob Moore		Mayflower Curling Club, Halifax
Peter Burgess	Glen MacLeod (skip)	Tyler Gamble	Robby McLean		Nova Scotia Curling Association
Jamie Murphy	Jordan Pinder	Scott Saccary	Phil Crowell	Bruce Lohnes	Mayflower Curling Club, Halifax
Chad Stevens	Paul Flemming	Cameron MacKenzie	Kelly Mittelstadt		Mayflower Curling Club, Halifax
Stuart Thompson	Colten Steele	Travis Colter	Alex MacNeil		Dartmouth Curling Club, Dartmouth

== Round-robin standings ==
Key
Teams to Playoffs
Teams to Tiebreaker

Skip	W	L
Stevens	7	0
Murphy	5	2
Adams	5	2
Thompson	4	3
Dexter	3	4
MacLeod	3	4
Danbrook	1	6
MacDougall	0	7

== Scores ==
=== January 19 ===
Draw 1

- Adams 6-5 MacLeod
- Murphy 8-2 Dexter
- Thompson 6-2 Danbrook
- Stevens 7-6 MacDougall

Draw 2

- Thompson 8-5 Dexter
- Adams 8-6 MacDougall
- Stevens 7-5 MacLeod
- Murphy 8-6 Danbrook

=== January 20 ===
Draw 3

- Stevens 8-1 Danbrook
- MacLeod 9-7 Thompson
- Murphy 10-9 MacDougall
- Adams 7-3 Dexter

Draw 4

- MacLeod 5-3 MacDougall
- Dexter 7-5 Danbrook
- Stevens 6-5 Adams
- Thompson 10-9 Murphy

=== January 21 ===
Draw 5

- Adams 6-4 Danbrook
- Murphy 6-5 MacLeod
- Thompson 8-5 MacDougall
- Stevens 6-2 Dexter

=== January 22 ===
Draw 6

- Stevens 6-5 Murphy
- Danbrook 12-7 MacDougall
- Dexter 7-5 MacLeod
- Adams 7-5 Thompson

Draw 7

- Dexter 6-4 MacDougall
- Stevens 6-5 Thompson
- Murphy 7-5 Adams
- MacLeod 8-5 Danbrook

== Playoffs ==
Semifinal			Final
			1	Chad Stevens	5
2	Jamie Murphy	5	2	Jamie Murphy	6
3	Shawn Adams	4

=== Semifinal ===
Saturday, January 23, 7:00 pm

Team	1	2	3	4	5	6	7	8	9	10	Final
Jamie Murphy	2	0	0	0	0	0	1	2	0	0	5
Shawn Adams	0	0	1	1	0	0	0	0	1	1	4

=== Final ===
Sunday, January 24, 3:00 pm

Team	1	2	3	4	5	6	7	8	9	10	11	Final
Chad Stevens	0	2	0	0	1	0	0	2	0	0	0	5
Jamie Murphy	0	0	0	1	0	2	1	0	0	1	1	6

2016 East Coast Credit Union Tankard

Jamie Murphy
3rd Nova Scotia Provincial Championship title
