= 2014 Canadian Junior Curling Championships =

Curling tournament

2014 M&M Meat Shops Canadian Junior Curling Championships
- Host city: Liverpool, Nova Scotia
- Arena: Queens Place Emera Centre; Liverpool Curling Club
- Dates: January 18–26
- Men's winner: Manitoba
- Curling club: Deer Lodge CC, Winnipeg
- Skip: Braden Calvert
- Third: Kyle Kurz
- Second: Lucas Van Den Bosch
- Lead: Brendan Wilson
- Finalist: New Brunswick (Rene Comeau)
- Women's winner: Alberta
- Curling club: Saville SC, Edmonton
- Skip: Kelsey Rocque
- Third: Keely Brown
- Second: Taylor McDonald
- Lead: Claire Tully
- Finalist: British Columbia (Kalia Van Osch)

The 2014 M&M Meat Shops Canadian Junior Curling Championships were held from January 18 to 26 at the Queens Place Emera Centre and the Liverpool Curling Club. The winners represented Canada at the 2014 World Junior Curling Championships in Flims, Switzerland.

== Men ==
=== Round Robin Standings ===
Final Round Robin Standings

Key
Teams to Championship Pool

Pool A	Skip	W	L
Manitoba	Braden Calvert	6	0
Saskatchewan	Tyler Hartung	4	2
Ontario	Ryan McCrady	4	2
Northern Ontario	Tanner Horgan	4	2
Quebec	Adam Freilich	2	4
Newfoundland and Labrador	Stephen Trickett	1	5
Nunavut	Jamie Airut	0	6

Pool B	Skip	W	L
New Brunswick	Rene Comeau	5	1
Alberta	Carter Lautner	5	1
Nova Scotia	Robert Mayhew	4	2
British Columbia	Cameron de Jong	3	3
Yukon	Joe Wallingham	2	4
Prince Edward Island	Kyle Holland	1	5
Northwest Territories	Matthew Miller	1	5

=== Championship Pool Standings ===
Final Standings

Key
Teams to Playoffs

Province	Skip	W	L
Manitoba	Braden Calvert	9	1
New Brunswick	Rene Comeau	7	3
Alberta	Carter Lautner	7	3
Ontario	Ryan McCrady	6	4
Nova Scotia	Robert Mayhew	6	4
Saskatchewan	Tyler Hartung	6	4
Northern Ontario	Tanner Horgan	5	5
British Columbia	Cameron de Jong	5	5

=== Playoffs ===
Semifinal			Final
			1	Manitoba	7
2	New Brunswick	9	2	New Brunswick	5
3	Alberta	4

==== Semifinal ====
Sunday, January 26, 9:30 am

Sheet B	1	2	3	4	5	6	7	8	9	10	Final
New Brunswick (Comeau)	0	2	2	3	0	1	0	0	1	X	9
Alberta (Lautner)	0	0	0	0	1	0	2	1	0	X	4

Player percentages
New Brunswick		Alberta	
Ryan Freeze	71%	Kyle Morrison	88%
Jordon Craft	84%	David Aho	75%
Daniel Wenzek	71%	Taylor Ardiel	67%
Rene Comeau	83%	Carter Lautner	78%
Total	77%	Total	77%

==== Final ====
Sunday, January 26, 4:00 pm

Team	1	2	3	4	5	6	7	8	9	10	Final
Manitoba (Calvert)	1	0	1	4	0	0	0	1	0	X	7
New Brunswick (Comeau)	0	2	0	0	2	0	1	0	0	X	5

Player percentages
Manitoba		New Brunswick	
Brendan Wilson	84%	Ryan Freeze	85%
Lucas Van Den Bosch	88%	Jordon Craft	90%
Kyle Kruz	81%	Daniel Wenzek	86%
Braden Calvert	85%	Rene Comeau	88%
Total	84%	Total	87%

== Women ==
=== Round Robin Standings ===
Final Round Robin Standings

Key
Teams to Championship Pool
Teams to Tiebreaker

Pool A	Skip	W	L
Alberta	Kelsey Rocque	6	0
British Columbia	Kalia Van Osch	4	2
Saskatchewan	Kristen Streifel	3	3
Quebec	Camille Boisvert	3	3
Yukon	Sarah Koltun	3	3
Northwest Territories	Carina McKay-Saturnino	2	4
Nunavut	Sadie Pinksen	0	6

Pool B	Skip	W	L
Ontario	Molly Greenwood	5	1
Nova Scotia	Mary Fay	5	1
New Brunswick	Jessica Daigle	3	3
Manitoba	Meaghan Brezden	3	3
Northern Ontario	Krysta Burns	2	4
Prince Edward Island	Veronica Smith	2	4
Newfoundland and Labrador	Sarah Hill	1	5

=== Championship Pool Standings ===
Final Standings

Key
Teams to Playoffs

Province	Skip	W	L
Alberta	Kelsey Rocque	9	1
British Columbia	Kalia Van Osch	8	2
Nova Scotia	Mary Fay	8	2
Ontario	Molly Greenwood	7	3
Manitoba	Meaghan Brezden	5	5
Saskatchewan	Kristen Streifel	4	6
New Brunswick	Jessica Daigle	4	6
Quebec	Camille Boisvert	3	7

=== Playoffs ===
Semifinal			Final
			1	Alberta	7
2	British Columbia	8	2	British Columbia	6
3	Nova Scotia	4

==== Semifinal ====
Saturday, January 25, 9:30 am

Team	1	2	3	4	5	6	7	8	9	10	11	Final
British Columbia (Van Osch)	2	0	0	1	0	0	0	1	0	0	4	8
Nova Scotia (Fay)	0	0	2	0	0	1	0	0	0	1	0	4

Player percentages
British Columbia		Nova Scotia	
Ashley Sanderson	73%	Janique LeBlanc	85%
Sarah Daniels	76%	Karlee Burgess	70%
Marika Van Osch	66%	Jenn Smith	70%
Kalia Van Osch	76%	Mary Fay	70%
Total	73%	Total	74%

==== Final ====
Saturday, January 25, 4:00 pm

Team	1	2	3	4	5	6	7	8	9	10	Final
Alberta (Rocque)	0	0	2	0	2	0	2	0	0	1	7
British Columbia (Van Osch)	0	0	0	1	0	3	0	2	0	0	6

Player percentages
Alberta		British Columbia	
Claire Tully	85%	Ashley Sanderson	86%
Taylor McDonald	88%	Sarah Daniels	70%
Keely Brown	93%	Marika Van Osch	85%
Kelsey Rocque	68%	Kalia Van Osch	70%
Total	84%	Total	78%

== Qualification ==
=== Newfoundland and Labrador ===
The Junior Provincials are being held December 27–30 at the Re/Max Centre in St. John's. Junior Women's will be a double round robin; Junior Men's will be a single round robin. For the playoffs, the Junior Women's division will have the top two teams advancing to the playoffs; Junior Men's division will have the top three teams advancing to the playoffs. If a team goes undefeated in the round robin, they must be beaten twice in the playoffs.

Results:

Men's	W	L
James Bryson (Re/Max)	4	0
Stephen Trickett (Re/Max)	3	1
Greg Blyde (Re/Max)	2	2
Kyle Barron (Caribou)	1	3
Andrew Taylor (Re/Max)	0	4

Women's	W	L
Sarah Hill (Re/Max)	6	0
Lauren Rolling (Re/Max)	3	3
Rebecca Roberts (Caribou)	2	4
Megan Kearley (Re/Max)	1	5

- Men's semi final: Trickett 9 - Blyde 4
- Men's final 1: Bryson 3 - Trickett 9
- Men's final 2: Bryson 6 - Trickett 7
- Women's final 1: Hill 6 - Rolling 7
- Women's final 2: Hill 10 - Rolling 5

=== Nova Scotia ===
The 2014 AMJ Campbell NS Junior Provincials are being held December 27–31 at the Lakeshore Curling Club in Lower Sackville. The event is a modified triple knock-out qualifying three teams in a modified playoff.

Pre-Playoff Results:

Men's	W	L
Robert Mayhew (Windsor)	6	1
Matthew Manuel (Mayflower)	4	2
Scott Babin (Truro)	4	3
Alex Rafuse (Halifax)	3	3
Trevor Crouse (Bridgewater)	2	3
Adam Cocks (Chester)	1	3
Kyle Meisner (Chester)	1	3
Mitchell Cortello (CFB Halifax)	0	3

Women's	W	L
Emily Dwyer (Mayflower)	5	2
Mary Fay (Chester)	4	2
Mary Myketyn-Driscoll (Truro)	3	2
Hayley McCabe (Lakeshore)	4	3
Emily Manuel (Mayflower)	3	3
Micayla Dorey (Wolfville)	2	3
Brooke DeMone (Lunenburg)	0	3
Hannah Stevens (Chester)	0	3

Playoff Results:

- Men's semi final: Mayhew 8 - Manuel 3
- Men's final (N/A): Mayhew vs Mayhew
- Women's semi final: Fay 9 - Dwyer 2
- Women's final: Myketyn-Driscoll 4 - Fay 9

=== Prince Edward Island ===
The Pepsi PEI Provincial Junior Curling Championships are being held December 19–23 at the Silver Fox Curling & Yacht Club in Summerside.

The junior men will play a triple-knockout format, which will qualify four teams for a Page championship round. The junior women will play a single-pool round robin, with the top three teams advancing to the championship round.

Pre-Playoff Results:

Men's	W	L
Kyle Holland (Charlottetown)	3	0
Matthew MacLean (Silver Fox)	3	1
Tyler Smith (Montague)	4	2
Alex MacFadyen (Silver Fox)	3	2
Justin Campbell (Silver Fox)	2	3
Leslie Noye (Western)	2	3
Donald DeWolfe (Cornwall)	0	3
Devin Schut (Cornwall)	0	3

Women's	W	L
Veronica Smith (Cornwall)	6	0
Amanda MacLean (Cornwall)	5	1
Emily Keen (Cornwall)	4	2
Kaleigh MacKay (Crapaud/Montague)	2	4
Lauren Moerike (Charlottetown)	2	4
Meghan Ching (Cornwall)	1	5
Jenny McLean (Silver Fox)	1	5

Playoff Results:

- Men's 1v2: Holland 8 - MacLean 0
- Men's 3v4: MacFadyen 4 - Smith 7
- Men's semi final: MacLean 4 - Smith 8
- Men's final: Holland 8 - Smith 5
- Women's semi final: MacLean 7 - Keen 6
- Women's final: Smith 6 - MacLean 4

=== New Brunswick ===
The O'Leary Junior Provincial Championships are being held December 27–30 at the Thistle St. Andrews Curling Club in Saint John. The event is a triple-knockout event. Due to power outages, the venue was changed from the Riverside Country Club in Rothesay to Thistle St. Andrews Curling Club and started on December 28. The Emily Wood team out of the Bathurst Curling Club also withdrew.

Results:

Men's	W	L
Rene Comeau (Capital Winter)	6	1
Spencer Watts (Gage)	5	2
Daniel Prest (Capital Winter)	3	3
Carter Small (Capital Winter)	2	3
Jack Smeltzer-McCausland (Capital Winter)	2	3
Liam Garcia (Thistle)	1	3
Kyle Hughes (Riverside)	1	3
Matt Nason (Thistle)	1	3

Women's	W	L
Samantha Crook (Gage)	4	2
Danielle Hubbard (Miramichi)	4	2
Jessica Daigle (Capital Winter)	3	2
Jamie Ward (Capital Winter)	4	3
Justine Comeau (Capital Winter)	2	3
Grace Standen (Moncton)	1	3
Amber Hicks (Sackville)	0	3

- Men's semi final: Comeau 11 - Watts 10
- Men's final (N/A): Comeau vs Comeau
- Women's semi final: Daigle 7 - Hubbard 3
- Women's final: Crook 5 - Daigle 7

=== Quebec ===
The Quebec Provincial Junior Championships are being held from December 26–31 at the Club de Curling Glenmore in Dollard-des-Ormeaux, Quebec.

The event is a round-robin with a modified playoff.

Men's	W	L
Mark Fajertag (Montréal-Ouest)	5	2
Gregory Bornais (Jacques-Cartier)	5	2
Adam Freilich (Boucherville)	5	2
Jeffery Stewart (Sherbrooke)	4	3
Scott MacDonald-Ducharme (Baie d'Urfé)	4	3
Félix Asselin (Trois-Rivières)	2	5
Louis Quevillon (Lacolle)	2	5
Gregory Raymond (Laval)	1	6

Women's	W	L
Sarah Dumais (Etchemin)	6	1
Laura Guénard (Dolbeau/Kénogami)	5	2
Lisa Davies (Glenmore)	5	2
Marianne Girard (Jacques-Cartier)	5	2
Émilia Gagné (Riverbend/Kénogami)	4	3
Marie-Pier Dicaire (Belvédère)	1	6
Gabrielle Lavoie (Victoria)	1	6
Taylor Mackay (St-Lambert)	1	6

- Men's semi final: Bornais 5 - Freilich 8
- Men's final: Fajertag 4 - Freilich 11
- Women's tie-breaker: Davies 7 - Girard 3
- Women's semi final: Guénard 5 - Davies 7
- Women's final: Dumais 6 - Davies 1

=== Ontario ===
The Pepsi Ontario Junior Curling Championships are being held January 2–6 at the Gananoque Curling Club in Gananoque, Ontario.

Results:

Men's	W	L
Ryan McCrady (Rideau)	6	1
Fraser Reid (Kitchener-Waterloo)	6	1
Ben Bevan (Annandale)	4	3
Matthew Hall (Stroud)	4	3
Colton Daly (London)	3	4
Conor Joudrey (Dixie)	3	4
Eric Bradey (Highland)	1	6
Pascal Michaud (Huntley)	1	6

Women's	W	L
Molly Greenwood (Kitchener-Waterloo)	6	1
Kendall Haymes (Listowel)	6	1
Chelsea Brandwood (St. Catharines)	5	2
Emma Wallingford (Carleton Heights)	4	3
Kaitlin Jewer (Annandale)	3	4
Kristina Adams (Peterborough)	2	5
Cassandra Lewin (RCMP)	2	5
Kirsten Marshall (Stroud)	0	7

- Men's tie-breaker: Bevan 9 - Hall 7
- Men's semi final: Reid 5 - Bevan 3
- Men's final: McCrady 9 - Reid 3
- Women's semi final: Haymes 8 - Brandwood 5
- Women's final: Greenwood 10 - Haymes 7

=== Northern Ontario ===
The Junior Provincial Championships are being held January 2–5 at the Longlac Curling Club in Longlac (men's) and the Fort William Curling Club in Thunder Bay (women's).

Results:

Men's	W	L
Jordan Potter (Porth Arthur)	6	1
Tanner Horgan (Idylwylde)	5	2
Cody Tetreault (Thessalon)	4	3
Sam Cull (Sudbury)	3	4
Nick Dawson (Soo CA)	3	4
Isaac Keffer (Port Arthur)	3	4
Matthew Smith (Port Arthur)	3	4
Cedric Lachance (Longlac)	1	6

Women's	W	L
Krysta Burns (Idylwylde)	7	0
Robin Beaudry (Idylwylde)	5	2
Megan Smith (Sudbury)	4	3
Tiana Gaudry (Port Arthur)	3	4
Jenna Poirier (Sioux Lookout)	3	4
Peyton St. Pierre (Copper Cliff)	3	4
Jennifer Keetch (Port Arthur)	2	5
Isabelle Ouellet (Longlac)	1	6

- Men's semi final: Horgan 8 - Tetreault 6
- Men's final: Potter 4 - Horgan 6
- Women's semi final: Beaudry 12 - Smith 3
- Women's final: Burns 5 - Beaudry 3

=== Manitoba ===
The Canola Junior Provincial Championships are being held December 26–31 at the Portage Curling Club in Portage la Prairie, Manitoba.

Results:

Men's	W	L
Asham Black Group
Matt Dunstone (West Kildonan)	7	0
Braden Calvert (Deer Lodge)	5	2
Sean Davidson (Portage)	4	3
Ty Dilello (Fort Rouge)	3	4
Tyler Grumpelt (Brandon)	3	4
Austin Mustard (Portage)	3	4
JT Ryan (Assiniboine Memorial)	3	4
Myles Hicks (The Pas)	0	7
Red Brick Red Group
Cole Peters (St. Vital)	6	1
Kyle Doering (West Kildonan)	6	1
Shayne Macgranachan (Brandon)	5	2
Jordan Smith (East St Paul)	5	2
Colin Kurz (Wildewood)	2	5
Steffan Adamchuk (Swan River)	2	5
Nathaniel Swanson (Heather)	1	6
Carter Watkins (Swan River)	1	6

Women's	W	L
Asham Black Group
Meaghan Brezden (Granite)	5	2
Rachel Burtnyk (Assiniboine Memorial)	5	2
Kristy Watling (Victoria)	5	2
Ashley Groff (Carman)	4	3
Beth Peterson (Victoria)	4	3
Heather Maxted (Teulon)	3	4
Kylee Calvert (Carberry)	2	5
Hanne Jensen (Dauphin)	0	7
Red Brick Red Group
Meagan Grenkow (Assiniboine Memorial)	6	1
Shannon Birchard (St. Vital)	6	1
Jennifer Curle (Victoria)	4	3
Rebecca Lamb (Stonewall)	4	3
Sara Oliver (Victoria)	4	3
Hannah Brown (Elmwood)	2	5
Lisa Reid (Victoria)	2	5
Allyson Spencer (Carman)	0	7

- Men's B1 vs R1: Dunstone 7 - Peters 6
- Men's B2 vs R2: Calvert 9 - Doering 2
- Men's semi final: Peters 4 - Calvert 6
- Men's final: Dunstone 1 - Calvert 6
- Women's Black Group tie-breaker: Burtnyk 4 - Watling 7
- Women's B1 vs R1: Brezden 10 - Grenkow 1
- Women's B2 vs R2: Watling 6 - Birchard 5
- Women's semi final: Grenkow 4 - Watling 7
- Women's final: Brezden 8 - Watling 2

=== Saskatchewan ===
The Junior Provincial Championships are being held December 27–31 at the Twin Rivers Curling Club in North Battleford.

Men's	W	L
Pool A
Brady Scharback (Sutherland)	5	0
Cole Tenetuik (Moose Jaw)	4	1
Jeremy Ven Der Buhs (Sutherland)	3	2
Austin Williamson (Callie)	2	3
Justin Anderson (Humboldt)	1	4
Kevin Haines (Callie)	0	5
Pool B
Tyler Hartung (Langenburg)	5	0
Chad Lang (Nutana)	4	1
Dean Jaeb (Humboldt)	3	2
Russell Green (Sutherland)	2	3
Brayden Stewart (Maryfield)	1	4
Judd Dlouhy (Assiniboia)	0	5

Women's	W	L
Pool A
Jessica Hanson (Granite)	5	0
Danielle Bertsch (Sutherland)	4	1
Brooke Tokarz (Nutana)	3	2
Kaitlin Corbin (Moose Jaw)	2	3
Courtney Orsen (Granite)	1	4
Allyson Grywacheski (Callie)	0	5
Pool B
Lorraine Schneider (Kronau)	5	0
Kristen Streifel (Nutana)	4	1
Katherine Michaluk (Callie)	2	3
Nicole Thompson (Callie)	2	3
Lisa Chambers (North Battleford)	1	4
Rachel Erickson (Maryfield)	1	4

- Men's A1 vs. B1: Scharback 3 - Hartung 6
- Men's A2 vs. B2: Tenetuik 4 - Lang 7
- Men's semi final: Scharback 7 - Lang 9
- Men's final: Hartung 9 – Lang 7
- Women's A1 vs. B1: Hanson 7 - Schneider 2
- Women's A2 vs. B2: Bertsch 2 - Streifel 7
- Women's semi final: Schneider 5 - Streifel 6
- Women's final: Hanson 7 – Streifel 8

=== Alberta ===
The Subway Junior Provincials are being held December 26–31 at the Leduc Curling Club in Leduc, Alberta.

Results:

Men's	W	L
Carter Lautner (Glencoe)	6	1
Thomas Scoffin (Saville)	5	2
Jeremy Harty (Calgary/Glencoe)	4	3
Kenton Maschmeyer (Saville)	4	3
Daylan Vavrek (Dawson Creek)	4	3
Scott Smith (Calgary)	3	4
Dustin Turcotte (Fahler)	2	5
Aiden Procter (Saville)	0	7

Women's	W	L
Kelsey Rocque (Saville)	6	1
Jocelyn Peterman (Glencoe)	6	1
Janais DeJong (Sexsmith)	4	3
Selena Sturmay (Airdrie)	4	3
Chantele Broderson (Lacombe)	3	4
Morgan Krassman (Medicine Hat)	2	5
Taylore Theroux (Saville)	2	5
Courtney Rossing (Grande Prairie)	1	6

- Men's tie-breaker 1: Maschmeyer 8 - Harty 5
- Men's tie-breaker 2: Vavrek 8 - Maschmeyer 2
- Men's semi final: Scoffin 8 - Vavrek 7
- Men's final: Lautner 7 - Scoffin 4
- Women's tie-breaker 1: DeJong 3 - Sturmay 4
- Women's semi final: Peterman 5 - Sturmay 4
- Women's final: Rocque 6 - Peterman 5

=== British Columbia ===
The Tim Horton's Junior Provincial Championships are being held December 26–31 at the Chilliwack Curling Club in Chilliwack, British Columbia.

Results:

Men's	W	L
Tyler Tardi (Langley)	7	0
Cameron de Jong (Juan De Fuca)	6	1
Nolan Reid (Victoria)	4	3
Kyle Habkirk (Coquitlam)	3	4
Cody Tanaka (Tunnel Town/Langley)	3	4
Nick Parker (Royal City)	2	5
Justin Umpherville (Beaver Valley)	2	5
Brendan Cliff (Vernon)	1	6

Women's	W	L
Corryn Brown (Kamloops)	6	1
Kalia Van Osch (Nanaimo/Delta)	6	1
Dezaray Hawes (Royal City)	4	3
Shawna Jensen (Victoria)	4	3
Amy Edwards (Vernon)	3	4
Brandi Tinkler (Juan de Fuca)	3	4
Mariah Coulombe (Juan De Fuca)	2	5
Briana Egan (Coquitlam)	0	7

- Men's semi final: de Jong 7 - Reid 2
- Men's final: Tardi 5 - de Jong 10
- Women's tie-breaker: Hawes 3 - Jensen 9
- Women's semi final: Van Osch 10 - Jensen 3
- Women's final: Brown 6 - Van Osch 7

=== Yukon ===
Hosted Dec. 21-22 at the Whitehorse Curling Club

- Men's Winners: Joe Wallingham defeated Christopher Nerysoo
- Women's Winners: Sarah Koltun defeated Bailey Horte

=== Northwest Territories ===
Hosted Dec. 19-22 at Hay River

Results:

Men's	W	L
Logan Gagnier (Hay River)	3	1
Matthew Miller (Inuvik)	3	1
Reid Tait (Yellowknife)	0	4

- Men's Tie-Breaker: Miller 9 - Gagnier 7
- Women's winner: Carina McKay-Saturnino (Inuvik) defeated Olivia Gibbons (Hay River)

=== Nunavut ===
- Women: Sadie Pinksen (Iqaluit CC)
- Men: Jamie Airut (Qavik CC)

== Awards ==
The all-star teams and award winners are as follows:

=== All-Star teams ===
Women

First Team

- Skip: Kelsey Rocque, Alberta 79%
- Third: Marika Van Osch, British Columbia 81%
- Second: Sarah Daniels, British Columbia 80%
- Lead: Karlee Korchinski, Saskatchewan 82%

Second Team

- Skip: Mary Fay, Nova Scotia 73%
- Third: Amy Heitzner, Ontario 77%
- Second: Karlee Burgess, Nova Scotia 76%
- Lead: Ashley Sanderson, British Columbia 80%

Men

First Team

- Skip: Carter Lautner, Alberta 80%
- Third: Michael Brophy, Nova Scotia 80%
- Second: Lucas Van Den Bosch, Manitoba 81%
- Lead: Jason Olsthoorn, Quebec 81%

Second Team

- Skip: Ryan McCrady, Ontario 77%
- Third: Daniel Wenzek, New Brunswick 79%
- Second: David Aho, Alberta 79%
- Lead: Cole Lyon-Hatcher, Ontario 81%

=== Ken Watson Sportsmanship Awards ===
Women

- Patty Wallingham, Yukon second

Men

- Taylor Ardriel, Alberta third

=== Fair Play Awards ===
Women

- Lead: Hilary Charlie, Northwest Territories
- Second: Danielle Lafleur, Manitoba
- Third: Abby Ackland, Manitoba
- Skip: Carina McKay-Saturnino, Northwest Territories
- Coach: Dale McEwen, Manitoba

Men

- Lead: Deklen Crocker, Northwest Territories
- Second: Alex Sutherland, Prince Edward Island
- Third: Connor Faulkner, Nunavut
- Skip: Rene Comeau, New Brunswick
- Coach: Tom Clasper, Manitoba

=== ASHAM National Coaching Awards ===
Women

- Nick Saturnino, Northwest Territories

Men

- Tom Clasper, Manitoba

=== Joan Mead Legacy Awards ===
Women

- Cathlia Ward, New Brunswick Third

Men

- Cole Lyon-Hatcher, Ontario Lead
