= Jordon Craft =

Canadian curler

- Curler
- Born: November 10, 1993 (age 33); Saint John, New Brunswick

Team
- Curling club: Curl Moncton, Moncton, NB

Curling career
- Member Association: New Brunswick
- Top CTRS ranking: 101st (2019–20)

Jordon Craft (born November 10, 1993) is a Canadian curler from Saint John, New Brunswick.

== Career ==
Craft won the 2014 New Brunswick Junior Curling Championship. He played with Rene Comeau, Daniel Wenzek and Ryan Freeze at the 2014 Canadian Junior Curling Championships. They finished the round robin with a 5–1 record and the championship pool with a 7–3 record, qualifying them for the semifinal. They breezed past Alberta to face Manitoba in the gold medal game. The teams were even in percentages however Manitoba had a key steal of four which was ultimately the difference in the game. New Brunswick earned the silver medal.

== Teams ==
Season	Skip	Third	Second	Lead
2013–14	Rene Comeau	Daniel Wenzek	Jordon Craft	Ryan Freeze
2017–18	Ryan Freeze	Paul Nason	Jordon Craft	Zac Blanchard
2018–19	Rene Comeau	Ryan Freeze	Jordon Craft	Zac Blanchard
2019–20	Rene Comeau	Ryan Freeze	Jordon Craft	Zac Blanchard
