= Robert Mayhew (curler) =

Canadian curler

Robert Mayhew (born October 8, 1993 in Halifax, Nova Scotia) is a Canadian curler. He is the son of 1977 World Junior champion lead Alan Mayhew. Robert Mayhew has represented the Nova Scotia at the 2011 Canada Winter Games and the 2014 Canadian Junior Curling Championships.

== Career ==
For the Under 15 Mayhew curled with teammates Alex Macneil, Joe Organ, and Ben Organ. Together they did not win any Nova Scotia Under 15 titles.

Mayhew left the team to join with Michael Brophy, Jacob LeBlanc and Eric Sampson. This team played together for one year with minimal success, after which, Brophy and LeBlanc left the team. Mayhew and Sampson joined forces with Nick Burdock and Dillon O'Leary to attempt to represent Nova Scotia at the Canada Winter Games in Halifax in 2011. The new team had a rough start in the 2010 season. The team did not place highly in any junior events in Nova Scotia. The team did not place well at the Under 18 Championships either. However, the team did capture the second spot available for the Nova Scotia Canada Winter Games playdowns held later that year.

In September 2010, the team won an Atlantic Invitational for all the Atlantic region's Canada Games teams and the four that were playing down in November for Nova Scotia. They went through the event undefeated. In November, the Canada Games Team selection occurred. The event was a four team Round Robin with a Page playoff system. Team Mayhew went undefeated in round robin play but lost in the 1v2 page playoff against former teammates Brophy and Leblanc. Mayhew played the third ranked team and won gaining a berth to the final. The final game came down to an extra end where team Mayhew did not have the last rock advantage. In the end, team Mayhew won after a missed tough shot by their opponents. In December, team Mayhew also tried to enter the Under 21 (Junior) provincials through the last chance. The team was successful and obtained the last available spot in the province and earned a berth to Junior provincials in Truro, Nova Scotia. At Junior provincials later that month, managed to get third place with a 3-3 record.

In February 2011, Team Mayhew played in the 2011 Canada Winter Games. The team had a record of 4 wins and 2 losses, beating PEI (6-2), Northwest Territories (5-4), Quebec (4-2), and Alberta in the crossover game (4-3); and losing to New Brunswick (5-6) and Saskatchewan (1-8).
