= Ryan Freeze =

Canadian curler

- Curler
- Born: May 19, 1995 (age 31); Saint John, New Brunswick

Team
- Curling club: Thistle-St. Andrews CC, Saint John, NB

Curling career
- Member Association: New Brunswick
- Top CTRS ranking: 76th (2014–15)

Ryan Freeze (born May 19, 1995) is a Canadian curler from Saint John, New Brunswick.

== Career ==
Freeze won the 2014 New Brunswick Junior Curling Championship. He played with Rene Comeau, Daniel Wenzek and Jordon Craft at the 2014 Canadian Junior Curling Championships. They finished the round robin with a 5–1 record and the championship pool with a 7–3 record, qualifying them for the semifinal. They breezed past Alberta to face Manitoba in the gold medal game. The teams were even in percentages however Manitoba had a key steal of four which was ultimately the difference in the game. New Brunswick earned the silver medal.

Freeze would win the provincial championship again in 2015 this time with a new set of players Andrew Burgess, Alex MacNeil and Comeau still skipping. The team had an identical start as Comeau and Freeze did in 2014, going 5–1 in the round robin but improving in the championship pool, finishing 8–2. The team would unfortunately not reach the final this year, losing to Saskatchewan 8–6 in the semifinal. The following season, Team Comeau played in the 2015 GSOC Tour Challenge Tier 2 event, where they finished 1–3.

== Teams ==
Season	Skip	Third	Second	Lead
2013–14	Rene Comeau	Daniel Wenzek	Jordon Craft	Ryan Freeze
2014–15	Rene Comeau	Andrew Burgess	Alex MacNeil	Ryan Freeze
2015–16	Rene Comeau	Andrew Burgess	Carter Small	Ryan Freeze
2016–17	Jeremy Mallais	Jason Vaughan	Mark Kehoe	Ryan Freeze
2017–18	Ryan Freeze	Paul Nason	Jordon Craft	Zac Blanchard
2018–19	Rene Comeau	Ryan Freeze	Jordon Craft	Zac Blanchard
2019–20	Rene Comeau	Ryan Freeze	Jordon Craft	Zac Blanchard
