= 2000 New Brunswick Labatt Tankard =

- Host city: Fredericton, New Brunswick
- Arena: Capital Winter Club
- Dates: February 2–6
- Winner: Team Howard
- Curling club: Beaver CC, Moncton
- Skip: Russ Howard
- Third: Wayne Tallon
- Second: Rick Perron
- Lead: Grant Odishaw
- Finalist: Jim Sullivan

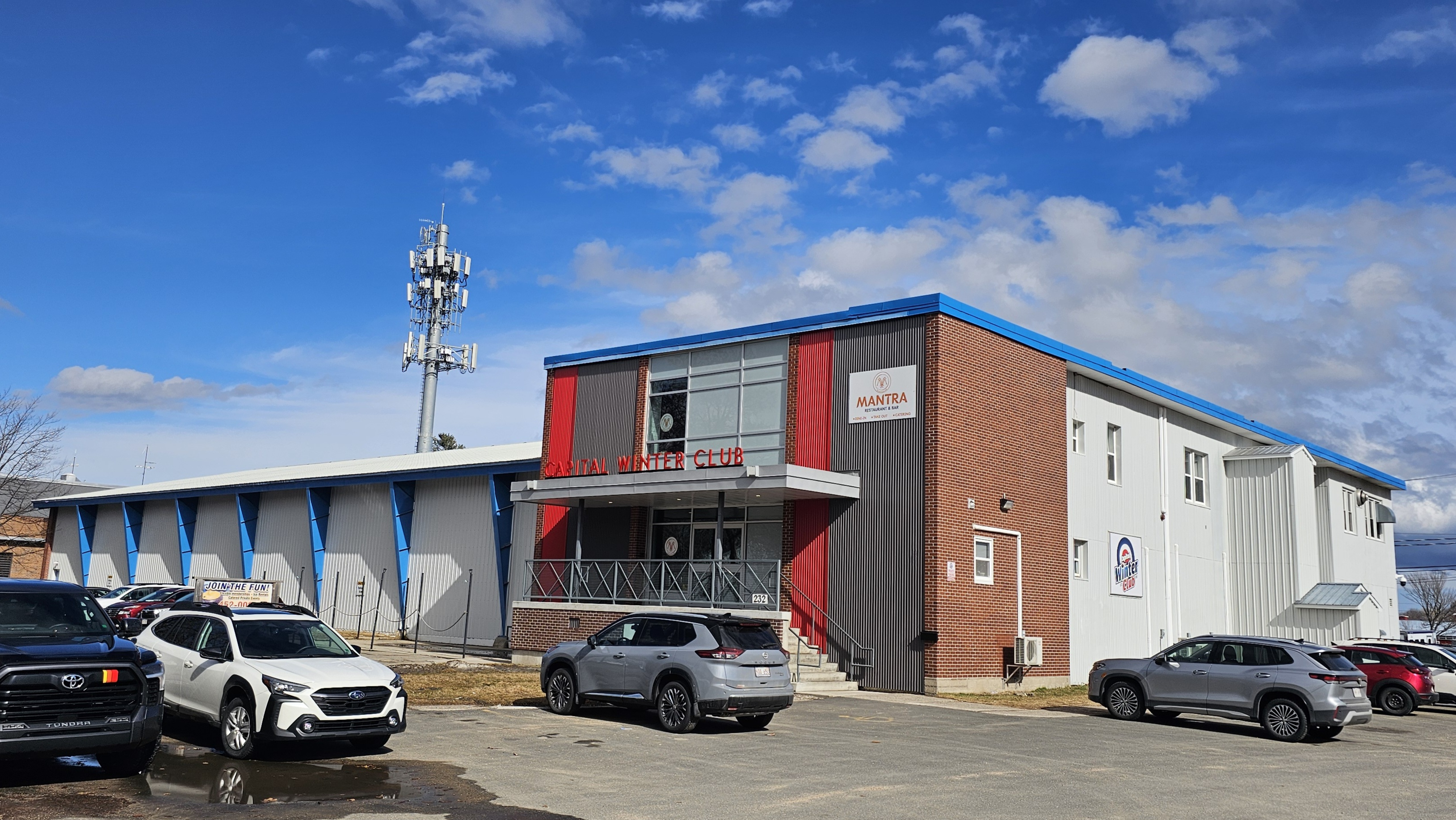
The Capital Winter Club in 2026

The 2000 New Brunswick Labatt Tankard, the provincial men's curling championship for New Brunswick, was held from February 2 to 6 at the Capital Winter Club in Fredericton, New Brunswick. The winning Russ Howard rink represented New Brunswick at the 2000 Labatt Brier in Saskatoon, Saskatchewan.

== Teams ==
The teams are listed as follows:

Skip	Vice	Second	Lead	Alternate	Club
Wade Blanchard	Charlie Sullivan Jr.	Mark Dobson	Jeff Lacey		Thistle-St. Andrews CC, Saint John
Peter Case	Mike Dobson	Paul Dobson	Scott Nealis (Note: Team Case alternate Geoff Porter threw lead stones in Draws 4 and 5.)	Geoff Porter	Thistle-St. Andrews CC, Saint John
Russ Howard	Wayne Tallon	Rick Perron	Grant Odishaw		Beaver CC, Moncton
Mike Kennedy	Terry Odishaw	Marc Lecocq	Daryell Nowlan		Grand Falls CC, Grand Falls
Barry Lewis	Serge Denis	Andre Boudreau	Darrel Rice		Beaver CC, Moncton
Bryan MacPherson	Mark Armstrong	Joe Vautour	Brad MacPherson (Note: Team MacPherson alternate Kevin Loughery threw lead stones in Draws 1 and 6.)	Kevin Loughery	Riverside G&CC, Rothesay
David Nowlan	Brent Palmer	Jamie Brennan	Kevin Keefe		Capital WC, Fredericton
Jim Sullivan	Brian Dobson	Jason Vaughan	Dan Alderman		Thistle-St. Andrews CC, Saint John

== Round robin standings ==
Final Round Robin standings

Key
Teams to Playoffs
Teams to Tiebreaker

Skip	W	L	W–L	PF	PA	EW	EL	BE	SE
Russ Howard	6	1	–	51	27	31	21	4	8
Jim Sullivan	5	2	–	40	33	25	24	2	5
Wade Blanchard	4	3	1–0	36	41	26	26	10	5
Mike Kennedy	4	3	0–1	46	44	28	30	3	3
Barry Lewis	3	4	–	41	40	27	27	10	6
Bryan MacPherson	2	5	2–0	43	51	26	31	2	4
Peter Case	2	5	1–1	37	48	24	27	7	3
David Nowlan	2	5	0–2	36	46	28	29	3	5

== Round Robin results ==
All draw times listed in Atlantic Time (UTC−04:00).

=== Draw 1 ===
Wednesday, February 2, 8:00 pm

Sheet 1	1	2	3	4	5	6	7	8	9	10	Final
Jim Sullivan	0	0	0	1	0	0	1	0	2	0	4
Peter Case 🔨	0	0	2	0	0	1	0	2	0	1	6

Sheet 2	1	2	3	4	5	6	7	8	9	10	11	Final
Bryan MacPherson	0	2	0	1	1	0	1	0	0	2	1	8
David Nowlan 🔨	1	0	2	0	0	1	0	2	1	0	0	7

Sheet 3	1	2	3	4	5	6	7	8	9	10	11	Final
Barry Lewis 🔨	0	0	0	2	0	1	0	1	0	2	0	6
Mike Kennedy	0	0	1	0	1	0	2	0	2	0	1	7

Sheet 4	1	2	3	4	5	6	7	8	9	10	Final
Russ Howard 🔨	2	1	0	4	1	0	2	X	X	X	10
Wade Blanchard	0	0	0	0	0	2	0	X	X	X	2

=== Draw 2 ===
Thursday, February 3, 9:00 am

Sheet 1	1	2	3	4	5	6	7	8	9	10	Final
Barry Lewis	1	0	0	1	0	0	1	0	X	X	3
Russ Howard 🔨	0	2	1	0	1	3	0	1	X	X	8

Sheet 2	1	2	3	4	5	6	7	8	9	10	Final
Mike Kennedy	0	1	0	1	0	1	0	2	0	0	5
Wade Blanchard 🔨	1	0	1	0	1	0	3	0	1	2	9

Sheet 3	1	2	3	4	5	6	7	8	9	10	Final
Peter Case	0	2	0	1	0	2	1	2	X	X	8
David Nowlan 🔨	1	0	0	0	1	0	0	0	X	X	2

Sheet 4	1	2	3	4	5	6	7	8	9	10	Final
Bryan MacPherson	0	0	1	0	2	0	X	X	X	X	3
Jim Sullivan 🔨	1	2	0	3	0	4	X	X	X	X	10

=== Draw 3 ===
Thursday, February 3, 2:30 pm

Sheet 1	1	2	3	4	5	6	7	8	9	10	Final
David Nowlan	0	2	0	1	1	1	1	0	1	X	7
Mike Kennedy 🔨	2	0	0	0	0	0	0	2	0	X	4

Sheet 2	1	2	3	4	5	6	7	8	9	10	Final
Russ Howard	0	1	0	2	0	1	0	0	1	X	5
Jim Sullivan 🔨	1	0	3	0	1	0	1	1	0	X	7

Sheet 3	1	2	3	4	5	6	7	8	9	10	Final
Wade Blanchard	0	0	2	0	0	1	0	0	2	1	6
Bryan MacPherson 🔨	1	0	0	2	0	0	0	2	0	0	5

Sheet 4	1	2	3	4	5	6	7	8	9	10	Final
Peter Case	0	0	1	0	0	1	0	2	0	X	4
Barry Lewis 🔨	0	2	0	0	1	0	3	0	2	X	8

=== Draw 4 ===
Friday, February 4, 9:00 am

Sheet 1	1	2	3	4	5	6	7	8	9	10	Final
Bryan MacPherson	4	0	0	0	1	0	0	1	0	X	6
Barry Lewis 🔨	0	1	1	1	0	1	1	0	3	X	8

Sheet 2	1	2	3	4	5	6	7	8	9	10	Final
Wade Blanchard	1	0	0	1	0	0	2	0	0	1	5
Peter Case 🔨	0	0	0	0	1	0	0	2	0	0	3

Sheet 3	1	2	3	4	5	6	7	8	9	10	Final
Jim Sullivan	0	1	0	0	0	0	1	0	X	X	2
Mike Kennedy 🔨	1	0	1	0	1	3	0	1	X	X	7

Sheet 4	1	2	3	4	5	6	7	8	9	10	Final
David Nowlan	0	1	0	1	0	2	0	1	0	X	5
Russ Howard 🔨	2	0	2	0	2	0	2	0	1	X	9

=== Draw 5 ===
Friday, February 4, 2:30 pm

Sheet 1	1	2	3	4	5	6	7	8	9	10	Final
Jim Sullivan	0	2	0	0	1	0	0	0	0	3	6
Wade Blanchard	1	0	0	1	0	0	0	1	2	0	5

Sheet 2	1	2	3	4	5	6	7	8	9	10	Final
Barry Lewis	0	1	0	0	0	1	0	3	0	X	5
David Nowlan	1	0	3	0	0	0	1	0	2	X	7

Sheet 3	1	2	3	4	5	6	7	8	9	10	Final
Russ Howard	0	0	1	0	1	0	2	0	0	1	6
Bryan MacPherson	1	0	0	1	0	2	0	1	0	0	5

Sheet 4	1	2	3	4	5	6	7	8	9	10	11	Final
Mike Kennedy	0	0	2	0	2	0	3	0	2	0	2	11
Peter Case	1	0	0	1	0	3	0	2	0	2	0	9

=== Draw 6 ===
Friday, February 4, 8:00 pm

Sheet 1	1	2	3	4	5	6	7	8	9	10	Final
Peter Case	0	1	0	2	0	0	2	0	X	X	5
Bryan MacPherson 🔨	2	0	2	0	2	1	0	4	X	X	11

Sheet 2	1	2	3	4	5	6	7	8	9	10	Final
Mike Kennedy	0	0	1	0	0	0	0	2	0	X	3
Russ Howard 🔨	0	2	0	0	2	0	1	0	1	X	6

Sheet 3	1	2	3	4	5	6	7	8	9	10	Final
David Nowlan	0	0	1	0	0	2	0	0	1	X	4
Jim Sullivan 🔨	1	0	0	2	2	0	0	2	0	X	7

Sheet 4	1	2	3	4	5	6	7	8	9	10	Final
Barry Lewis	1	0	0	2	0	2	1	0	2	X	8
Wade Blanchard 🔨	0	1	0	0	2	0	0	1	0	X	4

=== Draw 7 ===
Saturday, February 5, 9:00 am

Sheet 1	1	2	3	4	5	6	7	8	9	10	11	Final
Wade Blanchard	0	0	2	0	0	1	0	0	1	0	1	5
David Nowlan 🔨	0	1	0	1	0	0	1	0	0	1	0	4

Sheet 2	1	2	3	4	5	6	7	8	9	10	Final
Jim Sullivan	0	1	0	1	1	1	0	0	0	X	4
Barry Lewis 🔨	2	0	0	0	0	0	0	0	1	X	3

Sheet 3	1	2	3	4	5	6	7	8	9	10	Final
Russ Howard	1	0	0	2	0	1	0	3	X	X	7
Peter Case 🔨	0	0	1	0	0	0	1	0	X	X	2

Sheet 4	1	2	3	4	5	6	7	8	9	10	Final
Bryan MacPherson	0	2	0	1	0	0	0	2	0	X	5
Mike Kennedy 🔨	1	0	2	0	2	1	0	0	3	X	9

== Tiebreaker ==
Saturday February 5, 2:30 pm

Sheet 2	1	2	3	4	5	6	7	8	9	10	Final
Wade Blanchard	1	0	0	0	0	1	0	0	0	0	2
Mike Kennedy 🔨	0	2	0	0	0	0	0	0	2	0	4

== Playoffs ==
Semifinal			Final
			1	Russ Howard	8
2	Jim Sullivan	6	2	Jim Sullivan	4
3	Mike Kennedy	2

=== Semifinal ===
Saturday, February 5, 8:00 pm

Sheet 4	1	2	3	4	5	6	7	8	9	10	Final
Jim Sullivan 🔨	0	2	1	0	0	2	0	0	1	X	6
Mike Kennedy	0	0	0	1	0	0	1	0	0	X	2

=== Final ===
Sunday, February 6, 2:30 pm

Sheet 3	1	2	3	4	5	6	7	8	9	10	Final
Russ Howard 🔨	2	0	0	0	0	0	4	0	2	X	8
Jim Sullivan	0	1	0	0	1	0	0	2	0	X	4

2000 New Brunswick Labatt Tankard

Russ Howard
2nd New Brunswick Provincial Championship title
