= 2016 Pepsi Tankard =

- Host city: Rothesay, New Brunswick
- Arena: Riverside Country Club
- Dates: Feb 3-7
- Winner: Mike Kennedy
- Curling club: Curl Moncton, Moncton, NB
- Skip: Mike Kennedy
- Third: Scott Jones
- Second: Marc LeCocq
- Lead: Jamie Brannen
- Finalist: Terry Odishaw

The 2016 Pepsi Tankard, the provincial men's curling championship of New Brunswick was held February 3 to 7 at the Riverside Country Club in Rothesay, New Brunswick. The winning Mike Kennedy rink represented New Brunswick at the 2016 Tim Hortons Brier in Ottawa.

== Teams ==
The teams are listed as follows:

Skip	Third	Second	Lead	Club(s)
Rene Comeau	Andrew Burgess	Trevor Crouse	Ryan Freeze	Capital Winter Club, Fredericton
James Grattan	Tom Sullivan	Steve Burgess	Jamie Korab	Gage Golf & Curling Club, Oromocto
Mike Kennedy	Scott Jones	Marc LeCocq	Jamie Brannen	Curl Moncton, Moncton
Jeremy Mallais	Zach Eldridge	Chris Jeffrey	Jared Bezanson	Thistle-St. Andrew's Curling Club, Saint John
Terry Odishaw	Grant Odishaw	Mark Kehoe	Robert Daley	Curl Moncton, Moncton
Rick Perron	Marcel Robichaud	Marc Belliveau	Scott Nealis	Curl Moncton, Moncton
Jason Roach	Andy McCann	Darren Roach	Brian King	Thistle-St. Andrew's Curling Club, Saint John
Wayne Tallon	Spencer Watts	Chris Wagner	Alex Kyle	Capital Winter Club, Fredericton

== Round-robin standings ==
Key
Teams to Playoffs

Team	W	L
Kennedy	7	0
Odishaw	5	2
Perron	5	2
Roach	4	3
Grattan	3	4
Comeau	2	5
Mallais	1	6
Tallon	1	6

== Scores ==
=== February 3 ===
Draw 1

- Kennedy 9-7 Roach
- Comeau 10-9 Grattan
- Perron 7-5 Mallais
- Odishaw 6-2 Tallon

Draw 2

- Grattan 10-5 Odishaw
- Roach 7-2 Mallais
- Comeau 11-4 Tallon
- Kennedy 9-3 Perron

=== February 4 ===
Draw 3

- Mallais 8-5 Comeau
- Perron 8-4 Tallon
- Kennedy 7-5 Odishaw
- Roach 6-5 Grattan

Draw 4

- Grattan 9-2 Tallon
- Odishaw 7-5 Comeau
- Perron 5-4 Roach
- Kennedy 7-5 Mallais

=== February 5 ===
Draw 5

- Kennedy 6-4 Comeau
- Grattan 4-7 Perron
- Odishaw 7-4 Mallais
- Roach 9-3 Tallon

Draw 6

- Mallais 7-9 Tallon
- Roach 3-8 Odishaw
- Kennedy 7-3 Grattan
- Perron 8-2 Comeau

=== February 6 ===
Draw 7

- Odishaw 7-4 Perron
- Tallon 4-7 Kennedy
- Comeau 3-7 Roach
- Grattan 8-7 Mallais

== Playoffs ==
Semifinal			Final
			1	Mike Kennedy	9
2	Terry Odishaw	10	2	Terry Odishaw	3
3	Rick Perron	5

== Semifinal ==
Sheet A	1	2	3	4	5	6	7	8	9	10	Final
Terry Odishaw 🔨	1	0	0	1	0	2	0	0	6	X	10
Rick Perron	0	3	0	0	1	0	0	1	0	X	5

== Final ==
Sheet A	1	2	3	4	5	6	7	8	9	10	Final
Mike Kennedy 🔨	2	1	1	0	0	4	1	0	X	X	9
Terry Odishaw	0	0	0	1	0	0	0	2	X	X	3

2016 Pepsi Tankard

Mike Kennedy
5th New Brunswick Provincial Championship title
