= Wade Blanchard =

Canadian curler (1959–2025)

Medal record

Men's Curling

Representing Canada

World Senior Curling Championships
Gold medal – first place	2014 Dumfries	

Wade Michael Blanchard (March 3, 1959 – May 9, 2025) was a Canadian curler. He was a World Senior Curling champion. He is the only Saint John, New Brunswick-area curler to have played at the Brier, Canadian Mixed Curling Championship, Canadian Senior Curling Championships and the World Senior Curling Championships.

Blanchard was born to Mike and Bernice Blanchard in Windsor, Nova Scotia in 1959. He began curling in 1972–73. He moved to Rothesay, New Brunswick in 1978.

== Career ==
=== Men's and mixed ===
Blanchard joined the Richard Belyea rink for the 1979–80 season, playing second on the team. The rink won the 1980 Ganong Cup, the provincial men's championship for New Brunswick, defeating Belyea's former third Charlie Sullivan in the final. The team represented New Brunswick at the 1980 Labatt Brier, Canada's national men's curling championship, where they finished with a 3–8 record.

Blanchard would eventually form his own team of Norbert MacKinnon, Doug MacDonald and Bill Oliver. The rink won the 1986 New Brunswick championship, defeating Gary Mitchell in the final. After winning, the team added Blanchard's father Mike as their fifth man for the 1986 Labatt Brier. Representing New Brunswick at the Brier, Blanchard led his team to a 4–7 record.

Blanchard made it to the provincial final again in 1988, but with a different team. In the championship, he lost to the hometown Steve Adams from Newcastle.

In 2001, Blanchard, Heidi Hanlon, Greg Hanlon and wife Judy won the New Brunswick Mixed Curling Championship, defeating Derek Ellard in the final. This qualified the rink to represent the province at the 2002 Canadian Mixed Curling Championship. At the Canadian Mixed, the team finished in 11th place overall, with a 3–8 record.

In 1999, Blanchard made it to the final of that year's provincial championship where he faced off against former World Champion (and future Olympic gold medallist) Russ Howard who had just moved to the province. Blanchard had beaten Howard twice that season, handing Howard two of his three losses in playdown play, but couldn't beat him in the final, losing 6–5.

Blanchard would not win another provincial men's championship until 2005. Blanchard, and his new rink of Mark Dobson, Paul Dobson and Geoff Porter upset Russ Howard twice to win the 2005 Labatt Tankard provincial championship. Representing New Brunswick at the 2005 Tim Hortons Brier, Blanchard led his rink to a 3–8 record.

=== Seniors ===
In 2011, Blanchard and teammates Rick Perron, Alain Richard and Micky Mazerolle won the New Brunswick Senior Men's Championship over Wayne Tallon. The rink represented New Brunswick at the 2011 Canadian Senior Curling Championships, finishing with a 3–8 record.

In 2013, four skips – Wayne Tallon, Mike Kennedy, Mike Flannery and Blanchard got together to form a "dream team", entering New Brunswick's senior men's playdowns. After going down 1–2 in the preliminary playdowns, the team won the provincial championship, winning six straight games in the process, defeating Mark Armstrong in the final. This qualified the rink to represent New Brunswick at the 2013 Canadian Senior Curling Championships. There, the team went 10–1 in round robin play, and defeated Ontario, skipped by Howard Rajala in the final. The team then represented Canada at the 2014 World Senior Curling Championships. There, team went 8–0 in pool play, before downing Scotland in the quarters, the United States in the semifinals, then Sweden (skipped by Connie Östlund) in the final to win the gold medal.

The Tallon rink won the New Brunswick senior men's title again in 2015, defeating Robert MacDiarmid in the provincial final. At the 2015 Canadian Senior Curling Championships, the team won the bronze medal, defeating Quebec's Ted Butler in the third place game.

In 2019, Blanchard skipped his own senior team of Greg Hanlon, Jeff Freeze and Claude Moore. The team beat Mike Flannery in the provincial final, sending them to represent New Brunswick at the 2019 Canadian Senior Curling Championships. At the Canadian Seniors, the team went win-less, losing all six of their games.

== Personal life and death ==
Blanchard was married to Judy Blanchard (a World Senior Curling Champion in her own right) and had three children. He worked for Willett Foods, The Food Group, Pete's Frootique, and E&J Gallo Winery, retiring in 2024.

Blanchard died at the Saint John Regional Hospital in Saint John, New Brunswick, on May 9, 2025, at the age of 66.

== Honours ==
Blanchard was inducted into the New Brunswick Sports Hall of Fame in 2021 (as a member of Team Tallon), the Greater Saint John Sports Hall of Fame in 2015 and the New Brunswick Curling Hall of Fame.
