= 2011 Canadian Senior Curling Championships =

2011 World Financial Group Canadian Senior Curling Championships
- Host city: Digby, Nova Scotia
- Arena: Digby Arena and Digby Curling Club
- Dates: March 19–26
- Men's winner: Manitoba
- Curling club: Neepawa CC, Neepawa
- Skip: Kelly Robertson
- Third: Doug Armour
- Second: Peter Prokopowich
- Lead: Robert Scales
- Finalist: Alberta (Brad Hannah)
- Women's winner: New Brunswick
- Curling club: Thistle Saint Andrews CC, Saint John
- Skip: Heidi Hanlon
- Third: Kathy Floyd
- Second: Judy Blanchard
- Lead: Jane Arsenau
- Finalist: Ontario (Joyce Potter)

The 2011 Canadian Senior Curling Championships were held from March 19 to 26 at the Digby Arena and Digby Curling Club in Digby, Nova Scotia. The winning teams represented Canada at the 2012 World Senior Curling Championships in Tårnby, Denmark.

== Men's ==
=== Teams ===
Team	Skip	Third	Second	Lead	Locale
British Columbia	Greg McAulay	Ken Watson	Dale Hockley	Dale Reibin	Richmond CC, Richmond
Alberta	Brad Hannah	Gary Greening	Don McKenzie	Lance Dealy	Saville Sports Centre, Edmonton
Saskatchewan	Brad Heidt	Gerald Shymko	Dan Ormsby	Sandy Sutherland	Kerrobert CC, Kerrobert
Manitoba	Kelly Robertson	Doug Armour	Peter Prokopowich	Robert Scales	Neepawa CC, Neepawa
Northern Ontario	Eric Harnden	Dion Dumontelle	Doug Hong	Mark Borgogelli	Sudbury CC, Sudbury
Ontario	Guy Racette	Brian Roblin	Tom Roblin	Brian Bobbie	Royal Canadian CC, Toronto
Quebec	Robert Maclean	John Stewart	Lawren Steventon	Dan Belliveau	Hudson Legion & Glenmore CC, Montreal
New Brunswick	Wade Blanchard	Rick Perron	Alain Richard	Mickey Mazzerolle	Thistle Saint Andrews CC, Saint John
Nova Scotia	Scott Saunders	Curt Palmer	Dave Slauenwhite	Glenn Josephson	Mayflower CC, Halifax
Prince Edward Island	Bill Hope	Craig Mackie	David Murphy	John Mullin	Charlottetown & Cornwall CC, Charlottetown
Newfoundland and Labrador	Jeff Thomas	Mark Noseworthy	Peter Hollett	Ross Young	RE/MAX Centre, St. John's
Yukon/Northwest Territories	George Hilderman	Pat Molloy	Dale Enzenauer	Gord Zealand	Whitehorse CC, Whitehorse

=== Standings ===
Province	W	L
Manitoba	10	1
Alberta	7	4
Newfoundland and Labrador	7	4
Saskatchewan	7	4
Quebec	6	5
Ontario	5	6
Northern Ontario	5	6
Nova Scotia	5	6
British Columbia	4	7
Prince Edward Island	4	7
Yukon/Northwest Territories	3	8
New Brunswick	3	8

=== Results ===
==== Draw 1 ====
Sheet B	1	2	3	4	5	6	7	8	9	10	Final
Northwest Territories/Yukon (Hilderman)	0	1	0	0	0	3	1	1	2	X	8
British Columbia (McAulay)	1	0	2	0	0	0	0	0	0	X	3

Sheet C	1	2	3	4	5	6	7	8	9	10	Final
Nova Scotia (Saunders)	0	0	1	0	0	0	0	3	0	2	6
Prince Edward Island (Hope)	0	1	0	0	0	0	1	0	1	0	3

Sheet D	1	2	3	4	5	6	7	8	9	10	11	Final
Alberta (Hannah)	0	0	1	0	0	1	1	1	0	0	1	5
Newfoundland and Labrador (Thomas)	0	1	0	1	1	0	0	0	0	1	0	4

Sheet F	1	2	3	4	5	6	7	8	9	10	Final
New Brunswick (Blanchard)	0	0	0	2	0	0	1	0	0	X	3
Manitoba (Robertson)	0	0	2	0	1	1	0	2	1	X	7

Sheet G	1	2	3	4	5	6	7	8	9	10	Final
Saskatchewan (Heidt)	0	0	1	0	0	1	0	2	0	1	5
Northern Ontario (Harnden)	0	1	0	1	0	0	1	0	1	0	4

Sheet H	1	2	3	4	5	6	7	8	9	10	Final
Quebec (Maclean)	0	1	0	2	0	2	0	1	X	X	6
Ontario (Racette)	2	0	3	0	5	0	2	0	X	X	12

==== Draw 2 ====
Sheet C	1	2	3	4	5	6	7	8	9	10	Final
New Brunswick (Blanchard)	2	0	0	1	0	1	0	0	0	0	4
Quebec (Maclean)	0	0	1	0	1	0	1	1	1	1	6

Sheet E	1	2	3	4	5	6	7	8	9	10	Final
Northwest Territories/Yukon (Hilderman)	1	0	0	0	1	0	0	0	0	X	2
Nova Scotia (Saunders)	0	2	0	0	0	0	0	3	1	X	6

Sheet G	1	2	3	4	5	6	7	8	9	10	Final
Newfoundland and Labrador (Thomas)	0	1	0	3	0	1	0	2	0	X	7
Ontario (Racette)	0	0	1	0	1	0	1	0	1	X	4

Sheet H	1	2	3	4	5	6	7	8	9	10	Final
Saskatchewan (Heidt)	0	2	0	0	2	0	2	0	2	1	9
Prince Edward Island (Hope)	1	0	0	2	0	0	0	4	0	0	7

==== Draw 3 ====
Sheet C	1	2	3	4	5	6	7	8	9	10	Final
Northern Ontario (Harnden)	0	1	0	1	1	0	0	2	0	0	5
Manitoba (Robertson)	1	0	2	0	0	0	2	0	0	1	6

Sheet E	1	2	3	4	5	6	7	8	9	10	Final
Prince Edward Island (Hope)	0	0	1	0	2	0	1	1	0	0	5
Newfoundland and Labrador (Thomas)	0	1	0	1	0	1	0	0	2	1	6

Sheet G	1	2	3	4	5	6	7	8	9	10	Final
British Columbia (McAulay)	0	3	1	0	0	2	0	2	0	X	8
New Brunswick (Blanchard)	1	0	0	2	0	0	2	0	1	X	6

Sheet H	1	2	3	4	5	6	7	8	9	10	Final
Alberta (Hannah)	1	2	0	2	1	0	1	2	X	X	9
Quebec (Maclean)	0	0	2	0	0	1	0	0	X	X	3

==== Draw 4 ====
Sheet C	1	2	3	4	5	6	7	8	9	10	Final
Ontario (Racette)	0	1	1	0	1	0	0	0	1	X	4
Saskatchewan (Heidt)	1	0	0	3	0	0	0	3	0	X	7

Sheet E	1	2	3	4	5	6	7	8	9	10	Final
Alberta (Hannah)	2	0	2	0	0	0	2	0	3	X	9
British Columbia (MacAulay)	0	0	0	1	1	2	0	1	0	X	5

Sheet G	1	2	3	4	5	6	7	8	9	10	Final
Northern Ontario (Harnden)	0	0	0	0	0	1	0	1	1	X	3
Nova Scotia (Saunders)	0	0	0	0	0	0	0	0	0	X	0

Sheet H	1	2	3	4	5	6	7	8	9	10	Final
Manitoba (Robertson)	0	2	3	0	3	0	2	X	X	X	10
Northwest Territories/Yukon (Hilderman)	1	0	0	1	0	3	0	X	X	X	5

==== Draw 5 ====
Sheet A	1	2	3	4	5	6	7	8	9	10	Final
Newfoundland and Labrador (Thomas)	1	0	1	0	2	0	0	1	0	1	6
Northern Ontario (Harnden)	0	2	0	2	0	0	0	0	1	0	5

Sheet B	1	2	3	4	5	6	7	8	9	10	Final
New Brunswick (Blanchard)	1	0	0	2	0	0	1	1	0	3	8
Alberta (Hannah)	0	0	1	0	0	3	0	0	2	0	6

Sheet D	1	2	3	4	5	6	7	8	9	10	Final
British Columbia (McAulay)	0	1	0	2	0	0	0	0	1	0	4
Quebec (Maclean)	1	0	2	0	1	0	0	0	0	1	5

Sheet F	1	2	3	4	5	6	7	8	9	10	Final
Manitoba (Robertson)	1	1	1	1	0	2	0	0	0	1	7
Prince Edward Island (Hope)	0	0	0	0	1	0	1	1	1	0	4

==== Draw 6 ====
Sheet A	1	2	3	4	5	6	7	8	9	10	Final
Ontario (Racette)	0	1	0	0	2	0	3	0	0	1	7
British Columbia (McAulay)	1	0	1	0	0	2	0	1	1	0	6

Sheet B	1	2	3	4	5	6	7	8	9	10	Final
Northern Ontario (Harnden)	3	0	1	0	1	0	2	0	0	1	8
Northwest Territories/Yukon (Hilderman)	0	1	0	1	0	1	0	2	1	0	6

Sheet D	1	2	3	4	5	6	7	8	9	10	Final
Manitoba (Robertson)	0	0	0	2	0	0	0	1	0	2	5
Nova Scotia (Saunders)	0	0	1	0	1	1	0	0	1	0	4

Sheet F	1	2	3	4	5	6	7	8	9	10	Final
Saskatchewan (Heidt)	2	0	0	0	1	0	2	0	X	X	5
Alberta (Hannah)	0	1	2	2	0	2	0	3	X	X	10

==== Draw 7 ====
Sheet A	1	2	3	4	5	6	7	8	9	10	Final
Nova Scotia (Saunders)	2	0	1	0	2	0	0	1	0	X	6
New Brunswick (Blanchard)	0	1	0	3	0	1	1	0	2	X	8

Sheet B	1	2	3	4	5	6	7	8	9	10	11	Final
Prince Edward Island (Hope)	0	1	0	1	1	0	1	0	0	1	1	6
Ontario (Racette)	1	0	1	0	0	1	0	1	1	0	0	5

Sheet D	1	2	3	4	5	6	7	8	9	10	Final
Newfoundland and Labrador (Thomas)	1	0	1	0	3	1	0	1	0	1	8
Saskatchewan (Heidt)	0	2	0	2	0	0	1	0	2	0	7

Sheet F	1	2	3	4	5	6	7	8	9	10	Final
Northwest Territories/Yukon (Hilderman)	0	0	0	1	0	1	0	0	2	X	4
Quebec (Maclean)	0	0	2	0	3	0	1	1	0	X	7

==== Draw 8 ====
Sheet C	1	2	3	4	5	6	7	8	9	10	Final
Alberta (Hannah)	0	1	0	1	0	1	0	0	X	X	3
Nova Scotia (Saunders)	2	0	2	0	1	0	2	3	X	X	10

Sheet E	1	2	3	4	5	6	7	8	9	10	Final
Ontario (Racette)	3	0	1	0	0	2	0	2	0	0	8
Manitoba (Robertson)	0	3	0	1	0	0	2	0	2	3	11

Sheet G	1	2	3	4	5	6	7	8	9	10	Final
Northwest Territories/Yukon (Hilderman)	2	0	1	0	0	0	2	1	0	X	6
Saskatchewan (Heidt)	0	1	0	3	1	3	0	0	2	X	10

Sheet H	1	2	3	4	5	6	7	8	9	10	11	Final
British Columbia (McAulay)	0	1	0	2	0	1	1	1	0	1	2	9
Northern Ontario (Harnden)	1	0	2	0	2	0	0	0	2	0	0	7

==== Draw 9 ====
Sheet C	1	2	3	4	5	6	7	8	9	10	Final
Newfoundland and Labrador (Thomas)	2	0	0	6	0	3	0	X	X	X	11
Northwest Territories/Yukon (Hilderman)	0	0	1	0	2	0	2	X	X	X	5

Sheet E	1	2	3	4	5	6	7	8	9	10	Final
Saskatchewan (Heidt)	0	0	1	1	0	0	0	1	0	2	5
New Brunswick (Blanchard)	0	0	0	0	0	1	1	0	1	0	3

Sheet G	1	2	3	4	5	6	7	8	9	10	Final
Quebec (Maclean)	0	1	0	2	1	0	0	2	0	3	9
Prince Edward Island (Hope)	1	0	2	0	0	0	2	0	2	0	7

Sheet H	1	2	3	4	5	6	7	8	9	10	Final
Nova Scotia (Saunders)	0	0	1	0	1	0	1	0	1	0	4
Ontario (Racette)	1	0	0	2	0	1	0	1	0	1	6

==== Draw 10 ====
Sheet C	1	2	3	4	5	6	7	8	9	10	Final
Prince Edward Island (Hope)	0	0	0	1	0	2	1	X	X	X	4
British Columbia (McAulay)	5	2	0	0	3	0	0	X	X	X	10

Sheet E	1	2	3	4	5	6	7	8	9	10	Final
Quebec (Maclean)	0	0	1	0	2	0	1	0	X	X	4
Northern Ontario (Harnden)	1	2	0	2	0	2	0	2	X	X	9

Sheet G	1	2	3	4	5	6	7	8	9	10	Final
Alberta (Hannah)	2	1	0	1	0	1	0	2	0	X	7
Manitoba (Robertson)	0	0	1	0	1	0	2	0	1	X	5

Sheet H	1	2	3	4	5	6	7	8	9	10	Final
New Brunswick (Blanchard)	1	0	0	3	1	0	0	1	0	0	6
Newfoundland and Labrador (Thomas)	0	0	1	0	0	2	2	0	2	1	8

==== Draw 11 ====
Sheet A	1	2	3	4	5	6	7	8	9	10	Final
Saskatchewan (Heidt)	0	3	2	0	2	0	0	0	1	X	8
Quebec (Maclean)	1	0	0	1	0	0	1	1	0	X	4

Sheet B	1	2	3	4	5	6	7	8	9	10	Final
Nova Scotia (Saunders)	0	0	1	0	0	2	0	1	1	2	7
Newfoundland and Labrador (Thomas)	1	1	0	1	0	0	1	0	0	0	4

Sheet D	1	2	3	4	5	6	7	8	9	10	Final
Northwest Territories/Yukon (Hilderman)	0	0	1	0	0	0	0	1	0	1	3
Prince Edward Island (Hope)	0	0	0	1	1	1	0	0	1	0	4

Sheet F	1	2	3	4	5	6	7	8	9	10	Final
Ontario (Racette)	3	1	0	1	0	1	0	0	1	0	7
New Brunswick (Blanchard)	0	0	2	0	2	0	0	2	0	2	8

==== Draw 12 ====
Sheet A	1	2	3	4	5	6	7	8	9	10	Final
Prince Edward Island (Hope)	0	2	0	2	1	3	1	0	1	X	10
Alberta (Hannah)	1	0	3	0	0	0	0	2	0	X	6

Sheet B	1	2	3	4	5	6	7	8	9	10	Final
Manitoba (Robertson)	0	0	0	2	0	0	1	0	0	1	4
Quebec (Maclean)	1	0	0	0	0	1	0	0	0	0	2

Sheet D	1	2	3	4	5	6	7	8	9	10	Final
Northern Ontario (Harnden)	0	2	0	3	0	0	4	0	X	X	9
New Brunswick (Blanchard)	1	0	1	0	1	0	0	1	X	X	4

Sheet F	1	2	3	4	5	6	7	8	9	10	Final
Newfoundland and Labrador (Thomas)	1	0	1	0	1	0	0	0	3	2	8
British Columbia (McAulay)	0	1	0	1	0	2	0	0	0	0	4

==== Draw 13 ====
Sheet A	1	2	3	4	5	6	7	8	9	10	Final
British Columbia (McAulay)	0	0	0	1	0	0	1	0	3	0	5
Nova Scotia (Saunders)	0	0	0	0	2	2	0	1	0	1	6

Sheet B	1	2	3	4	5	6	7	8	9	10	Final
Ontario (Racette)	0	1	0	1	1	0	2	1	0	X	6
Northern Ontario (Harnden)	0	0	1	0	0	1	0	0	1	X	3

Sheet D	1	2	3	4	5	6	7	8	9	10	Final
Saskatchewan (Heidt)	0	1	0	0	0	2	1	0	2	0	6
Manitoba (Robertson)	3	0	0	2	1	0	0	1	0	1	8

Sheet F	1	2	3	4	5	6	7	8	9	10	Final
Alberta (Hannah)	1	0	1	0	2	0	1	0	0	0	5
Northwest Territories/Yukon (Hilderman)	0	1	0	0	0	2	0	3	1	1	8

==== Draw 14 ====
Sheet C	1	2	3	4	5	6	7	8	9	10	11	Final
Quebec (Maclean)	0	1	0	2	0	0	0	0	0	3	2	8
Newfoundland and Labrador (Thomas)	0	0	1	0	2	1	0	1	1	0	0	6

Sheet E	1	2	3	4	5	6	7	8	9	10	Final
New Brunswick (Blanchard)	0	1	0	2	0	1	0	0	3	0	7
Prince Edward Island (Hope)	1	0	1	0	1	0	0	3	0	3	9

Sheet G	1	2	3	4	5	6	7	8	9	10	Final
Manitoba (Robertson)	0	0	2	0	2	0	1	1	1	X	7
British Columbia (McAulay)	0	1	0	1	0	2	0	0	0	X	4

Sheet H	1	2	3	4	5	6	7	8	9	10	Final
Northern Ontario (Harnden)	2	0	1	0	0	2	0	0	2	0	7
Alberta (Hannah)	0	1	0	2	1	0	2	1	0	1	8

==== Draw 15 ====
Sheet A	1	2	3	4	5	6	7	8	9	10	Final
New Brunswick (Blanchard)	0	0	1	1	1	0	1	0	0	0	4
Northwest Territories/Yukon (Hilderman)	0	1	0	0	0	0	0	1	2	1	5

Sheet B	1	2	3	4	5	6	7	8	9	10	Final
British Columbia (McAulay)	1	0	1	0	1	0	0	2	0	2	7
Saskatchewan (Heidt)	0	1	0	2	0	0	1	0	2	0	6

Sheet D	1	2	3	4	5	6	7	8	9	10	Final
Ontario (Racette)	0	1	0	2	0	0	1	0	1	0	5
Alberta (Hannah)	2	0	1	0	1	1	0	1	0	3	9

Sheet F	1	2	3	4	5	6	7	8	9	10	Final
Quebec (Maclean)	2	1	0	1	1	0	4	X	X	X	9
Nova Scotia (Saunders)	0	0	2	0	0	1	0	X	X	X	3

==== Draw 16 ====
Sheet A	1	2	3	4	5	6	7	8	9	10	Final
Manitoba (Robertson)	0	3	0	0	2	1	0	3	0	X	9
Newfoundland and Labrador (Thomas)	0	0	1	2	0	0	2	0	1	X	6

Sheet C	1	2	3	4	5	6	7	8	9	10	Final
Northwest Territories/Yukon (Hilderman)	0	0	1	0	1	0	1	0	X	X	3
Ontario (Racette)	0	1	0	1	0	3	0	3	X	X	8

Sheet E	1	2	3	4	5	6	7	8	9	10	Final
Nova Scotia (Saunders)	0	0	0	1	0	2	0	1	0	X	4
Saskatchewan (Heidt)	1	2	1	0	1	0	2	0	1	X	8

Sheet F	1	2	3	4	5	6	7	8	9	10	Final
Prince Edward Island (Hope)	1	0	1	0	2	0	1	X	X	X	5
Northern Ontario (Harnden)	0	2	0	6	0	2	0	X	X	X	10

=== Playoffs ===
Tiebreaker		Semifinal		Final
Newfoundland and Labrador	8
Saskatchewan	5	Alberta	6
		Newfoundland and Labrador	5
				Manitoba	7
				Alberta	5

==== Tiebreaker ====
Sheet C	1	2	3	4	5	6	7	8	9	10	Final
Newfoundland and Labrador (Thomas)	1	0	1	1	2	1	0	2	0	X	8
Saskatchewan (Heidt)	0	2	0	0	0	0	1	0	2	X	5

Player percentages
Newfoundland and Labrador		Saskatchewan	
Ross Young	85%	Sandy Sutherland	84%
Peter Hollett	85%	Dan Ormbsby	75%
Mark Noseworthy	92%	Peter Thiele	83%
Jeff Thomas	82%	Brad Heidt	61%
Total	86%	Total	76%

==== Semifinal ====
Sheet D	1	2	3	4	5	6	7	8	9	10	Final
Newfoundland and Labrador (Thomas)	0	0	2	0	0	1	0	2	0	0	5
Alberta (Hannah)	1	1	0	0	1	0	1	0	0	2	6

Player percentages
Newfoundland and Labrador		Alberta	
Ross Young	81%	Lance Dealy	93%
Peter Hollett	88%	Don McKenzie	75%
Mark Noseworthy	85%	Brad Hannah	86%
Jeff Thomas	80%	Gary Greening	83%
Total	83%	Total	84%

==== Final ====
Sheet B	1	2	3	4	5	6	7	8	9	10	Final
Manitoba (Robertson)	1	0	2	0	1	0	2	0	1	0	7
Alberta (Hannah)	0	1	0	0	0	1	0	1	0	2	5

Player percentages
Manitoba		Alberta	
Bob Scales	90%	Lance Dealy	91%
Peter Prokopowich	91%	Don McKenzie	65%
Doug Armour	84%	Brad Hannah	80%
Kelly Robertson	84%	Gary Greening	70%
Total	87%	Total	77%

== Women's ==
=== Teams ===
Team	Skip	Third	Second	Lead	Locale
British Columbia	Lynne Noble	Lorraine Jeffries	Lorraine Gagnon	Kristin Nickells	Qualicum & District CC, Qualicum Beach
Alberta	Diane Foster	June Campbell	Karen Morrison	Glenna Rubin	Acadia Recreation Complex, Calgary
Saskatchewan	Delores Syrota	Beverly Krasowski	Gloria Leach	Sylvia Broad	Wadena CC, Wadena
Manitoba	Deborah Popovich	Brenda Robinson	Monica Noakes	Sherrell McColm	Fort Garry CC, Winnipeg
Northern Ontario	Barbara Ward	Janice Atkinson	Jan Alexander	Vicki Boland	Port Arthur CC, Thunder Bay
Ontario	Joyce Potter	Diana Favel	Jennifer Langley	Brenda Moffitt	Rideau CC, Ottawa
Quebec	Odette Trudel	Suzanne Godin	Lynn Montambeault	Lorraine Levasseur	Club de curling Trois-Rivieres, Trois-Rivières
New Brunswick	Heidi Hanlon	Kathy Floyd	Judy Blanchard	Jane Arsenau	Thistle Saint Andrews CC, Saint John
Nova Scotia	Colleen Jones	Nancy Delahunt	Marsha Sobey	Sally Saunders	Mayflower CC, Halifax
Prince Edward Island	June Moyaert	Sherren MacKinnon	Terri Thompson	Kathy Clarey	Montague CC, Montague
Newfoundland and Labrador	Laura Philips	Diane Ryan	Marian Dawe	Jeanette Hodder	RE/MAX Centre, St. John's
Yukon/Northwest Territories	Sandy Penkala	Ann McKellar-Gillis	Marie Coe	Louise Marcinkoski	Whitehorse CC, Whitehorse

=== Standings ===
Province	W	L
Ontario	9	2
New Brunswick	9	2
Saskatchewan	8	3
Alberta	7	4
Nova Scotia	6	5
Prince Edward Island	6	5
British Columbia	6	5
Northern Ontario	5	6
Newfoundland and Labrador	3	8
Yukon/Northwest Territories	3	7
Manitoba	3	8
Quebec	1	10

=== Results ===
==== Draw 1 ====
Sheet B	1	2	3	4	5	6	7	8	9	10	Final
Nova Scotia (Delahunt)	1	0	1	0	2	2	0	2	0	X	8
Prince Edward Island (Moyaert)	0	1	0	1	0	0	1	0	1	X	4

Sheet C	1	2	3	4	5	6	7	8	9	10	Final
Northwest Territories/Yukon (Penkala)	0	1	0	0	0	0	0	2	0	X	3
British Columbia (Noble)	1	0	0	2	0	1	1	0	1	X	6

Sheet D	1	2	3	4	5	6	7	8	9	10	Final
Newfoundland and Labrador (Phillips)	0	1	0	0	0	2	0	0	0	X	3
Alberta (Foster)	0	0	0	0	1	0	3	1	1	X	6

Sheet F	1	2	3	4	5	6	7	8	9	10	Final
Saskatchewan (Syrota)	0	0	2	0	0	0	0	3	0	X	5
Northern Ontario (Ward)	0	0	0	2	0	0	0	0	2	X	4

Sheet G	1	2	3	4	5	6	7	8	9	10	Final
New Brunswick (Hanlon)	0	0	0	3	0	1	0	1	0	0	5
Manitoba (Popovic)	0	0	1	0	1	0	1	0	2	1	6

Sheet H	1	2	3	4	5	6	7	8	9	10	Final
Quebec (Trudel)	0	1	0	0	1	1	0	0	1	X	4
Ontario (Potter)	0	0	1	2	0	0	2	1	0	X	6

==== Draw 2 ====
Sheet A	1	2	3	4	5	6	7	8	9	10	11	Final
Saskatchewan (Syrota)	0	0	3	0	1	0	2	0	0	1	0	7
Prince Edward Island (Moyaert)	0	1	0	2	0	2	0	1	1	0	1	8

Sheet B	1	2	3	4	5	6	7	8	9	10	Final
New Brunswick (Hanlon)	1	0	2	2	0	3	0	1	X	X	9
Quebec (Trudel)	0	1	0	0	0	0	2	0	X	X	3

Sheet D	1	2	3	4	5	6	7	8	9	10	Final
Northwest Territories/Yukon (Penkala)	0	0	0	0	1	0	1	0	2	1	5
Nova Scotia (Delahunt)	2	0	0	1	0	1	0	2	0	0	6

Sheet F	1	2	3	4	5	6	7	8	9	10	11	Final
Newfoundland and Labrador (Phillips)	0	0	2	1	0	0	3	0	1	1	0	8
Ontario (Potter)	1	2	0	0	1	2	0	2	0	0	1	9

==== Draw 3 ====
Sheet A	1	2	3	4	5	6	7	8	9	10	Final
Alberta (Foster)	2	0	0	2	0	3	0	1	X	X	8
Quebec (Trudel)	0	0	1	0	1	0	1	0	X	X	3

Sheet B	1	2	3	4	5	6	7	8	9	10	Final
Northern Ontario (Ward)	1	0	0	1	0	2	1	0	1	X	6
Manitoba (Popovic)	0	0	0	0	2	0	0	1	0	X	3

Sheet D	1	2	3	4	5	6	7	8	9	10	11	Final
Prince Edward Island (Moyaert)	0	2	1	1	0	0	1	0	0	3	1	9
Newfoundland and Labrador (Phillips)	1	0	0	0	2	2	0	1	2	0	0	8

Sheet F	1	2	3	4	5	6	7	8	9	10	Final
British Columbia (Noble)	0	2	0	0	0	2	0	0	3	X	7
New Brunswick (Hanlon)	1	0	2	1	1	0	2	2	0	X	9

==== Draw 4 ====
Sheet A	1	2	3	4	5	6	7	8	9	10	Final
Manitoba (Popovic)	1	0	0	1	1	0	0	1	0	X	4
Northwest Territories/Yukon (Penkala)	0	2	1	0	0	2	2	0	2	X	9

Sheet B	1	2	3	4	5	6	7	8	9	10	Final
Ontario (Potter)	0	2	0	0	2	0	1	0	1	0	6
Saskatchewan (Syrota)	2	0	0	1	0	1	0	1	0	3	8

Sheet D	1	2	3	4	5	6	7	8	9	10	Final
Alberta (Foster)	0	0	0	1	0	1	0	2	0	3	7
British Columbia (Noble)	0	1	0	0	1	0	1	0	2	0	5

Sheet F	1	2	3	4	5	6	7	8	9	10	Final
Northern Ontario (Ward)	0	2	1	0	2	3	0	0	0	1	9
Nova Scotia (Delahunt)	1	0	0	3	0	0	1	2	1	0	8

==== Draw 5 ====
Sheet C	1	2	3	4	5	6	7	8	9	10	Final
New Brunswick (Hanlon)	2	0	0	2	0	0	1	0	1	4	10
Alberta (Foster)	0	2	0	0	1	1	0	1	0	0	5

Sheet E	1	2	3	4	5	6	7	8	9	10	Final
British Columbia (Noble)	1	1	1	0	2	0	0	2	0	X	7
Quebec (Trudel)	0	0	0	1	0	1	1	0	2	X	5

Sheet G	1	2	3	4	5	6	7	8	9	10	Final
Manitoba (Popovic)	4	2	0	3	0	0	1	0	0	X	10
Prince Edward Island (Moyaert)	0	0	2	0	1	1	0	2	1	X	7

Sheet H	1	2	3	4	5	6	7	8	9	10	Final
Newfoundland and Labrador (Phillips)	0	2	0	1	0	2	0	0	X	X	5
Northern Ontario (Ward)	4	0	2	0	2	0	1	1	X	X	10

==== Draw 6 ====
Sheet C	1	2	3	4	5	6	7	8	9	10	Final
Northern Ontario (Ward)	0	0	0	0	1	0	1	2	0	1	5
Northwest Territories/Yukon (Penkala)	2	0	0	2	0	2	0	0	1	0	7

Sheet E	1	2	3	4	5	6	7	8	9	10	Final
Manitoba (Popovic)	0	1	0	0	2	0	0	X	X	X	3
Nova Scotia (Delahunt)	3	0	1	4	0	1	1	X	X	X	10

Sheet G	1	2	3	4	5	6	7	8	9	10	Final
Saskatchewan (Syrota)	0	2	2	0	3	0	0	1	0	X	8
Alberta (Foster)	0	0	0	1	0	1	1	0	2	X	5

Sheet H	1	2	3	4	5	6	7	8	9	10	11	Final
Ontario (Potter)	0	0	0	1	0	2	1	2	2	1	1	10
British Columbia (Noble)	1	4	1	0	3	0	0	0	0	0	0	9

==== Draw 7 ====
Sheet C	1	2	3	4	5	6	7	8	9	10	Final
Prince Edward Island (Moyaert)	0	0	1	0	1	0	0	1	X	X	3
Ontario (Potter)	2	3	0	1	0	2	1	0	X	X	9

Sheet E	1	2	3	4	5	6	7	8	9	10	Final
Newfoundland and Labrador (Phillips)	0	1	0	0	1	0	2	X	X	X	4
Saskatchewan (Syrota)	3	0	2	4	0	2	0	X	X	X	11

Sheet G	1	2	3	4	5	6	7	8	9	10	Final
Northwest Territories/Yukon (Penkala)	0	0	2	0	0	1	1	1	0	0	5
Quebec (Trudel)	0	1	0	2	1	0	0	0	2	1	7

Sheet H	1	2	3	4	5	6	7	8	9	10	Final
Nova Scotia (Delahunt)	1	0	2	0	1	0	1	0	1	0	6
New Brunswick (Hanlon)	0	1	0	2	0	1	0	2	0	2	8

==== Draw 8 ====
Sheet A	1	2	3	4	5	6	7	8	9	10	Final
British Columbia (Noble)	1	0	0	0	0	1	0	2	1	1	6
Northern Ontario (Ward)	0	1	1	0	1	0	1	0	0	0	4

Sheet B	1	2	3	4	5	6	7	8	9	10	Final
Alberta (Foster)	0	0	0	0	1	0	1	0	2	2	6
Nova Scotia (Delahunt)	0	0	0	0	0	1	0	1	0	0	2

Sheet D	1	2	3	4	5	6	7	8	9	10	Final
Ontario (Potter)	2	1	0	6	0	1	1	X	X	X	11
Manitoba (Popovic)	0	0	1	0	1	0	0	X	X	X	2

Sheet F	1	2	3	4	5	6	7	8	9	10	Final
Northwest Territories/Yukon (Penkala)	1	0	1	0	0	1	1	0	1	0	5
Saskatchewan (Syrota)	0	1	0	0	3	0	0	2	0	1	7

==== Draw 9 ====
Sheet A	1	2	3	4	5	6	7	8	9	10	Final
Nova Scotia (Delahunt)	0	0	1	0	0	2	0	0	1	0	4
Ontario (Potter)	1	0	0	0	1	0	0	1	0	2	5

Sheet B	1	2	3	4	5	6	7	8	9	10	Final
Newfoundland and Labrador (Phillips)	0	3	1	5	0	2	0	X	X	X	11
Northwest Territories/Yukon (Penkala)	0	0	0	0	1	0	2	X	X	X	3

Sheet D	1	2	3	4	5	6	7	8	9	10	Final
Saskatchewan (Syrota)	0	0	0	0	1	0	2	0	3	X	6
New Brunswick (Hanlon)	0	1	0	1	0	2	0	4	0	X	8

Sheet F	1	2	3	4	5	6	7	8	9	10	Final
Quebec (Trudel)	0	1	0	0	1	0	0	1	0	X	3
Prince Edward Island (Moyaert)	1	0	1	1	0	1	1	0	5	X	10

==== Draw 10 ====
Sheet A	1	2	3	4	5	6	7	8	9	10	Final
New Brunswick (Hanlon)	0	0	2	0	1	0	1	0	0	2	6
Newfoundland and Labrador (Phillips)	1	0	0	0	0	1	0	1	1	0	4

Sheet B	1	2	3	4	5	6	7	8	9	10	Final
Prince Edward Island (Moyaert)	3	0	1	0	0	1	0	2	0	1	8
British Columbia (Noble)	0	2	0	1	1	0	1	0	1	0	6

Sheet D	1	2	3	4	5	6	7	8	9	10	11	Final
Quebec (Trudel)	0	0	1	1	0	1	0	3	0	2	0	8
Northern Ontario (Ward)	1	1	0	0	1	0	2	0	3	0	1	9

Sheet F	1	2	3	4	5	6	7	8	9	10	Final
Alberta (Foster)	1	1	1	2	0	0	0	0	1	0	6
Manitoba (Popovic)	0	0	0	0	1	1	1	1	0	1	5

==== Draw 11 ====
Sheet C	1	2	3	4	5	6	7	8	9	10	Final
Nova Scotia (Delahunt)	0	0	2	1	0	0	1	2	0	1	7
Newfoundland and Labrador (Phillips)	2	0	0	0	1	1	0	0	2	0	6

Sheet E	1	2	3	4	5	6	7	8	9	10	Final
Northwest Territories/Yukon (Penkala)	0	0	2	2	0	0	0	3	0	1	8
Prince Edward Island (Moyaert)	0	2	0	0	0	2	1	0	2	0	7

Sheet G	1	2	3	4	5	6	7	8	9	10	Final
Ontario (Potter)	0	1	0	2	1	0	1	0	1	1	7
New Brunswick (Hanlon)	1	0	1	0	0	1	0	2	0	0	5

Sheet H	1	2	3	4	5	6	7	8	9	10	Final
Saskatchewan (Syrota)	1	3	0	0	0	2	0	4	X	X	10
Quebec (Trudel)	0	0	1	0	0	0	1	0	X	X	2

==== Draw 12 ====
Sheet C	1	2	3	4	5	6	7	8	9	10	Final
Manitoba (Popovic)	1	1	0	0	2	0	1	0	1	0	6
Quebec (Trudel)	0	0	0	1	0	2	0	0	0	1	4

Sheet E	1	2	3	4	5	6	7	8	9	10	Final
Northern Ontario (Ward)	0	1	1	0	1	0	1	0	1	X	5
New Brunswick (Hanlon)	2	0	0	1	0	3	0	2	0	X	8

Sheet G	1	2	3	4	5	6	7	8	9	10	Final
Newfoundland and Labrador (Phillips)	1	3	0	0	1	0	0	1	1	0	7
British Columbia (Noble)	0	0	3	2	0	1	2	0	0	1	9

Sheet H	1	2	3	4	5	6	7	8	9	10	Final
Prince Edward Island (Moyaert)	1	0	1	2	0	2	1	0	0	1	8
Alberta (Foster)	0	1	0	0	1	0	0	3	1	0	6

==== Draw 13 ====
Sheet C	1	2	3	4	5	6	7	8	9	10	11	Final
Ontario (Potter)	1	0	1	0	0	0	0	3	1	0	0	6
Northern Ontario (Ward)	0	1	0	1	0	1	1	0	0	2	1	7

Sheet E	1	2	3	4	5	6	7	8	9	10	Final
Saskatchewan (Syrota)	2	0	3	0	2	0	3	X	X	X	10
Manitoba (Popovic)	0	1	0	1	0	1	0	X	X	X	3

Sheet G	1	2	3	4	5	6	7	8	9	10	Final
Alberta (Foster)	2	0	0	1	1	1	0	2	1	X	8
Northwest Territories/Yukon (Penkala)	0	2	1	0	0	0	2	0	0	X	5

Sheet H	1	2	3	4	5	6	7	8	9	10	Final
British Columbia (Noble)	2	1	0	2	0	0	0	0	0	X	5
Nova Scotia (Delahunt)	0	0	2	0	1	2	1	0	2	X	8

==== Draw 14 ====
Sheet A	1	2	3	4	5	6	7	8	9	10	Final
Northern Ontario (Ward)	0	2	0	0	1	0	1	1	0	X	5
Alberta (Foster)	2	0	0	1	0	3	0	0	2	X	8

Sheet B	1	2	3	4	5	6	7	8	9	10	Final
Quebec (Trudel)	0	0	0	1	1	0	0	X	X	X	2
Newfoundland and Labrador (Phillips)	2	1	2	0	0	4	1	X	X	X	10

Sheet D	1	2	3	4	5	6	7	8	9	10	Final
New Brunswick (Hanlon)	0	0	1	0	2	0	1	1	0	X	5
Prince Edward Island (Moyaert)	0	1	0	0	0	1	0	0	1	X	3

Sheet F	1	2	3	4	5	6	7	8	9	10	Final
Manitoba (Popovic)	0	0	0	1	0	X	X	X	X	X	1
British Columbia (Noble)	7	1	1	0	2	X	X	X	X	X	11

==== Draw 15 ====
Sheet C	1	2	3	4	5	6	7	8	9	10	Final
British Columbia (Noble)	0	0	1	0	1	0	3	1	0	1	7
Saskatchewan (Syrota)	2	0	0	1	0	2	0	0	0	0	5

Sheet E	1	2	3	4	5	6	7	8	9	10	Final
Ontario (Potter)	0	2	1	0	2	0	1	0	0	2	8
Alberta (Foster)	1	0	0	1	0	1	0	2	0	0	5

Sheet G	1	2	3	4	5	6	7	8	9	10	Final
Quebec (Trudel)	1	0	0	1	0	0	0	X	X	X	2
Nova Scotia (Delahunt)	0	2	2	0	2	0	1	X	X	X	7

Sheet H	1	2	3	4	5	6	7	8	9	10	Final
New Brunswick (Hanlon)	2	1	2	0	1	2	3	X	X	X	11
Northwest Territories/Yukon (Penkala)	0	0	0	1	0	0	0	X	X	X	1

==== Draw 16 ====
Sheet B	1	2	3	4	5	6	7	8	9	10	Final
Northwest Territories/Yukon (Penkala)	0	0	1	2	0	0	1	0	0	0	4
Ontario (Potter)	0	3	0	0	1	0	0	1	1	1	7

Sheet D	1	2	3	4	5	6	7	8	9	10	Final
Nova Scotia (Delahunt)	0	0	0	0	2	0	1	0	1	0	4
Saskatchewan (Syrota)	0	0	0	1	0	1	0	1	0	2	5

Sheet G	1	2	3	4	5	6	7	8	9	10	Final
Prince Edward Island (Moyaert)	0	0	1	0	2	2	2	0	X	X	7
Northern Ontario (Ward)	1	0	0	1	0	0	0	1	X	X	3

Sheet H	1	2	3	4	5	6	7	8	9	10	Final
Manitoba (Popovic)	0	2	0	0	1	0	1	0	0	X	4
Newfoundland and Labrador (Phillips)	2	0	0	3	0	0	0	2	4	X	11

=== Playoffs ===
Semi final		Final
New Brunswick	8
Saskatchewan	5	Ontario	6
		New Brunswick	8

==== Semifinal ====
Sheet B	1	2	3	4	5	6	7	8	9	10	Final
New Brunswick (Hanlon)	2	0	2	0	2	1	0	1	0	X	8
Saskatchewan (Syrota)	0	1	0	1	0	0	2	0	1	X	5

Player percentages
New Brunswick		Saskatchewan	
Jane Arseneau	83%	Sylvia Broad	84%
Judy Blanchard	80%	Gloria Leach	71%
Kathy Floyd	68%	Beverly Krasowski	75%
Heidi Hanlon	84%	Delores Syrota	58%
Total	79%	Total	72%

==== Final ====
Sheet D	1	2	3	4	5	6	7	8	9	10	Final
Ontario (Potter)	1	0	0	2	0	0	2	0	1	0	6
New Brunswick (Hanlon)	0	1	1	0	1	0	0	4	0	1	8

Player percentages
Ontario		New Brunswick	
Brenda Moffitt	73%	Jane Arseneau	71%
Jennifer Langley	80%	Judy Blanchard	78%
Diana Favel	73%	Kathy Floyd	83%
Joyce Potter	68%	Heidi Hanlon	80%
Total	73%	Total	78%
