= 1999 Labatt Brier =

- Host city: Edmonton, Alberta
- Arena: Skyreach Centre
- Dates: March 6–14
- Attendance: 242,887
- Winner: Manitoba
- Curling club: Charleswood CC, Winnipeg
- Skip: Jeff Stoughton
- Third: Jon Mead
- Second: Garry Van Den Berghe
- Lead: Doug Armstrong
- Alternate: Steve Gould
- Finalist: Quebec (Guy Hemmings)

The 1999 Labatt Brier, the Canadian men's curling championship, was held from March 6 to 14 at Skyreach Centre in Edmonton, Alberta. A total of 247,887 fans attended the event, which broke the previous record set in 1997.

Team Manitoba, who was skipped by Jeff Stoughton won the event as they defeated Guy Hemmings of Quebec in the final 9–5.

== Teams ==
The teams are listed as follows:

| Alberta | British Columbia | Manitoba |
|---|---|---|
| Ottewell CC, Edmonton Skip: Ken Hunka; Third: Brent MacDonald; Second: Blake MacDonald; Lead: Wade Johnston; Alternate: Jules Owchar | Kelowna CC, Kelowna Skip: Bert Gretzinger; Third: Bob Ursel; Second: Mark Whittle; Lead: Dave Mellof; Alternate: David Stephenson | Charleswood CC, Winnipeg Skip: Jeff Stoughton; Third: Jon Mead; Second: Garry Van Den Berghe; Lead: Doug Armstrong; Alternate: Steve Gould |
| New Brunswick | Newfoundland and Labrador | Northern Ontario |
| Beaver CC, Moncton Skip: Russ Howard; Third: Wayne Tallon (Note: For Draws 6 and 13, Team New Brunswick lead Grant Odishaw threw third stones, alternate Jeff Lacey threw lead stones, while third Wayne Tallon sat out.); Second: Rick Perron (Note: For Draws 1, 8 and 17, Team New Brunswick lead Grant Odishaw threw second stones, alternate Jeff Lacey threw lead stones, while second Rick Perron sat out.); Lead: Grant Odishaw (Note: Team New Brunswick alternate Jeff Lacey threw lead stones in Draws 5, 10, 14, and the tiebreaker game.); Alternate: Jeff Lacey | St. John's CC, St. John's Skip: Glenn Goss; Third: Glenn Turpin; Second: Ken Peddigrew (Note: Team Newfoundland alternate Geoff Cunningham threw second stones for Draws 13–15.); Lead: Brett Reynolds; Alternate: Geoff Cunningham | North Bay Granite Club, North Bay Skip: Scott Patterson; Third: Phil Loevenmark; Second: John McClelland; Lead: Wayne Lowe (Note: Team Northern Ontario alternate Gilles Allaire threw lead stones in Draw 11.); Alternate: Gilles Allaire |
| Nova Scotia | Ontario | Prince Edward Island |
| Mayflower CC, Halifax Skip: Paul Flemming; Third: Blayne Iskiw; Second: Andrew Dauphinee; Lead: Tom Fetterly; Alternate: Peter Eddy | Rideau CC, Ottawa Skip: Rich Moffatt; Third: Howard Rajala; Second: Chris Fulton; Lead: Paul Madden; Alternate: Brian Lewis | Charlottetown CC, Charlottetown Skip: Robert Campbell; Third: Peter Gallant; Second: Mark O'Rourke; Lead: Mark Butler; Alternate: David Campbell |
| Quebec | Saskatchewan | Yukon/Northwest Territories |
| CC Saint-Lambert & Tracy, Saint-Lambert Skip: Guy Hemmings; Third: Pierre Charette; Second: Guy Thibaudeau; Lead: Dale Ness; Alternate: Dwayne Fowler | Yorkton CC, Yorkton Skip: Gerald Shymko; Third: Gerry Adam; Second: Arnie Geisler; Lead: Neil Cursons; Alternate: Steve Sobkow | Whitehorse CC, Whitehorse Skip: Orest Peech; Third: Pat Paslawski; Second: Brian Wasnea; Lead: Don Irwin; Alternate: Lonnie Kofoed |

== Map of teams ==
Provincial Winners

== Round Robin standings ==
Final Round Robin standings

Key
| Teams to Playoffs |
| Teams to Tiebreaker |

| Locale | Skip | W | L | W–L | PF | PA | EW | EL | BE | SE | S% |
|---|---|---|---|---|---|---|---|---|---|---|---|
| Manitoba | Jeff Stoughton | 8 | 3 | 1–0 | 72 | 57 | 44 | 41 | 13 | 9 | 83% |
| Quebec | Guy Hemmings | 8 | 3 | 0–1 | 77 | 53 | 47 | 39 | 10 | 15 | 82% |
| Saskatchewan | Gerald Shymko | 7 | 4 | 2–0 | 69 | 66 | 42 | 42 | 8 | 11 | 82% |
| Nova Scotia | Paul Flemming | 7 | 4 | 1–1 | 69 | 61 | 42 | 40 | 7 | 8 | 80% |
| New Brunswick | Russ Howard | 7 | 4 | 0–2 | 74 | 65 | 43 | 46 | 3 | 9 | 82% |
| Ontario | Rich Moffatt | 6 | 5 | 1–0 | 66 | 74 | 46 | 47 | 10 | 9 | 83% |
| Northern Ontario | Scott Patterson | 6 | 5 | 0–1 | 60 | 56 | 37 | 39 | 17 | 8 | 80% |
| British Columbia | Bert Gretzinger | 5 | 6 | 1–0 | 67 | 63 | 44 | 38 | 12 | 9 | 83% |
| Alberta | Ken Hunka | 5 | 6 | 0–1 | 75 | 69 | 45 | 43 | 8 | 8 | 82% |
| Prince Edward Island | Robert Campbell | 4 | 7 | – | 65 | 75 | 47 | 48 | 3 | 7 | 80% |
| Newfoundland | Glenn Goss | 3 | 8 | – | 67 | 77 | 42 | 47 | 3 | 9 | 75% |
| Yukon/Northwest Territories | Orest Peech | 0 | 11 | – | 52 | 97 | 40 | 49 | 4 | 7 | 74% |

== Round robin results ==
All draw times are listed in Mountain Time (UTC−07:00).

=== Draw 1 ===
Saturday, March 6, 1:00 pm

| Sheet A | 1 | 2 | 3 | 4 | 5 | 6 | 7 | 8 | 9 | 10 | Final |
|---|---|---|---|---|---|---|---|---|---|---|---|
| Manitoba (Stoughton) | 0 | 0 | 2 | 1 | 0 | 1 | 0 | 3 | X | X | 7 |
| Northern Ontario (Patterson) 🔨 | 0 | 1 | 0 | 0 | 0 | 0 | 1 | 0 | X | X | 2 |

| Sheet B | 1 | 2 | 3 | 4 | 5 | 6 | 7 | 8 | 9 | 10 | Final |
|---|---|---|---|---|---|---|---|---|---|---|---|
| Yukon (Peech) | 0 | 1 | 0 | 2 | 0 | 0 | 0 | 1 | 0 | X | 4 |
| Alberta (Hunka) 🔨 | 3 | 0 | 3 | 0 | 0 | 0 | 1 | 0 | 2 | X | 9 |

| Sheet C | 1 | 2 | 3 | 4 | 5 | 6 | 7 | 8 | 9 | 10 | Final |
|---|---|---|---|---|---|---|---|---|---|---|---|
| New Brunswick (Howard) | 0 | 1 | 0 | 1 | 0 | 3 | 1 | 0 | 0 | X | 6 |
| Nova Scotia (Flemming) 🔨 | 2 | 0 | 3 | 0 | 1 | 0 | 0 | 0 | 3 | X | 9 |

| Sheet D | 1 | 2 | 3 | 4 | 5 | 6 | 7 | 8 | 9 | 10 | Final |
|---|---|---|---|---|---|---|---|---|---|---|---|
| Quebec (Hemmings) 🔨 | 2 | 0 | 0 | 2 | 0 | 1 | 0 | 0 | 3 | X | 8 |
| British Columbia (Gretzinger) | 0 | 0 | 1 | 0 | 2 | 0 | 0 | 3 | 0 | X | 6 |

=== Draw 2 ===
Saturday, March 6, 6:30 pm

| Sheet A | 1 | 2 | 3 | 4 | 5 | 6 | 7 | 8 | 9 | 10 | Final |
|---|---|---|---|---|---|---|---|---|---|---|---|
| Nova Scotia (Flemming) 🔨 | 2 | 0 | 2 | 2 | 0 | 1 | 0 | 3 | X | X | 10 |
| Yukon (Peech) | 0 | 1 | 0 | 0 | 1 | 0 | 2 | 0 | X | X | 4 |

| Sheet B | 1 | 2 | 3 | 4 | 5 | 6 | 7 | 8 | 9 | 10 | 11 | Final |
|---|---|---|---|---|---|---|---|---|---|---|---|---|
| Ontario (Moffatt) 🔨 | 0 | 3 | 0 | 1 | 0 | 2 | 0 | 2 | 0 | 0 | 2 | 10 |
| Saskatchewan (Shymko) | 0 | 0 | 1 | 0 | 2 | 0 | 1 | 0 | 2 | 2 | 0 | 8 |

| Sheet C | 1 | 2 | 3 | 4 | 5 | 6 | 7 | 8 | 9 | 10 | Final |
|---|---|---|---|---|---|---|---|---|---|---|---|
| Newfoundland (Goss) | 0 | 0 | 0 | 1 | 0 | 3 | 0 | 0 | 0 | X | 4 |
| Prince Edward Island (Campbell) 🔨 | 0 | 1 | 2 | 0 | 1 | 0 | 1 | 1 | 1 | X | 7 |

| Sheet D | 1 | 2 | 3 | 4 | 5 | 6 | 7 | 8 | 9 | 10 | Final |
|---|---|---|---|---|---|---|---|---|---|---|---|
| Alberta (Hunka) 🔨 | 0 | 0 | 2 | 0 | 1 | 0 | 1 | 0 | 2 | X | 6 |
| Manitoba (Stoughton) | 1 | 0 | 0 | 1 | 0 | 0 | 0 | 2 | 0 | X | 4 |

=== Draw 3 ===
Sunday, March 7, 8:30 am

| Sheet B | 1 | 2 | 3 | 4 | 5 | 6 | 7 | 8 | 9 | 10 | Final |
|---|---|---|---|---|---|---|---|---|---|---|---|
| Manitoba (Stoughton) 🔨 | 0 | 0 | 0 | 0 | 2 | 0 | 0 | 2 | 0 | 1 | 5 |
| Newfoundland (Goss) | 0 | 0 | 0 | 1 | 0 | 1 | 0 | 0 | 1 | 0 | 3 |

| Sheet C | 1 | 2 | 3 | 4 | 5 | 6 | 7 | 8 | 9 | 10 | Final |
|---|---|---|---|---|---|---|---|---|---|---|---|
| Saskatchewan (Shymko) 🔨 | 0 | 0 | 1 | 1 | 0 | 1 | 0 | 0 | 0 | X | 3 |
| Quebec (Hemmings) | 1 | 0 | 0 | 0 | 3 | 0 | 1 | 2 | 1 | X | 8 |

=== Draw 4 ===
Sunday, March 7, 1:00 pm

| Sheet A | 1 | 2 | 3 | 4 | 5 | 6 | 7 | 8 | 9 | 10 | Final |
|---|---|---|---|---|---|---|---|---|---|---|---|
| British Columbia (Gretzinger) 🔨 | 0 | 1 | 0 | 2 | 0 | 2 | 0 | 0 | 1 | X | 6 |
| New Brunswick (Howard) | 0 | 0 | 3 | 0 | 2 | 0 | 2 | 1 | 0 | X | 8 |

| Sheet B | 1 | 2 | 3 | 4 | 5 | 6 | 7 | 8 | 9 | 10 | 11 | Final |
|---|---|---|---|---|---|---|---|---|---|---|---|---|
| Prince Edward Island (Campbell) 🔨 | 1 | 0 | 1 | 0 | 0 | 2 | 0 | 0 | 2 | 0 | 0 | 6 |
| Ontario (Moffatt) | 0 | 1 | 0 | 2 | 0 | 0 | 0 | 1 | 0 | 2 | 1 | 7 |

| Sheet C | 1 | 2 | 3 | 4 | 5 | 6 | 7 | 8 | 9 | 10 | Final |
|---|---|---|---|---|---|---|---|---|---|---|---|
| Yukon (Peech) 🔨 | 1 | 0 | 1 | 0 | 0 | 0 | 1 | 0 | X | X | 3 |
| Northern Ontario (Patterson) | 0 | 2 | 0 | 4 | 0 | 2 | 0 | 3 | X | X | 11 |

| Sheet D | 1 | 2 | 3 | 4 | 5 | 6 | 7 | 8 | 9 | 10 | Final |
|---|---|---|---|---|---|---|---|---|---|---|---|
| Newfoundland (Goss) 🔨 | 1 | 0 | 2 | 0 | 1 | 0 | 0 | 2 | 0 | 0 | 6 |
| Saskatchewan (Shymko) | 0 | 1 | 0 | 1 | 0 | 2 | 1 | 0 | 0 | 3 | 8 |

=== Draw 5 ===
Sunday, March 7, 6:30 pm

| Sheet A | 1 | 2 | 3 | 4 | 5 | 6 | 7 | 8 | 9 | 10 | Final |
|---|---|---|---|---|---|---|---|---|---|---|---|
| Northern Ontario (Patterson) 🔨 | 3 | 0 | 0 | 1 | 1 | 0 | 2 | 0 | 1 | X | 8 |
| Prince Edward Island (Campbell) | 0 | 1 | 0 | 0 | 0 | 1 | 0 | 2 | 0 | X | 4 |

| Sheet B | 1 | 2 | 3 | 4 | 5 | 6 | 7 | 8 | 9 | 10 | Final |
|---|---|---|---|---|---|---|---|---|---|---|---|
| Quebec (Hemmings) 🔨 | 0 | 0 | 1 | 0 | 0 | 1 | 0 | 1 | 0 | 2 | 5 |
| Nova Scotia (Flemming) | 0 | 0 | 0 | 2 | 0 | 0 | 1 | 0 | 1 | 0 | 4 |

| Sheet C | 1 | 2 | 3 | 4 | 5 | 6 | 7 | 8 | 9 | 10 | Final |
|---|---|---|---|---|---|---|---|---|---|---|---|
| Ontario (Moffatt) 🔨 | 0 | 1 | 0 | 1 | 0 | 0 | 0 | 1 | 0 | X | 3 |
| British Columbia (Gretzinger) | 0 | 0 | 2 | 0 | 0 | 1 | 1 | 0 | 4 | X | 8 |

| Sheet D | 1 | 2 | 3 | 4 | 5 | 6 | 7 | 8 | 9 | 10 | Final |
|---|---|---|---|---|---|---|---|---|---|---|---|
| New Brunswick (Howard) 🔨 | 2 | 0 | 4 | 0 | 2 | 0 | 0 | 1 | 0 | X | 9 |
| Alberta (Hunka) | 0 | 2 | 0 | 1 | 0 | 1 | 1 | 0 | 2 | X | 7 |

=== Draw 6 ===
Monday, March 8, 8:30 am

| Sheet A | 1 | 2 | 3 | 4 | 5 | 6 | 7 | 8 | 9 | 10 | 11 | Final |
|---|---|---|---|---|---|---|---|---|---|---|---|---|
| Ontario (Moffatt) 🔨 | 0 | 0 | 2 | 0 | 1 | 0 | 1 | 0 | 0 | 1 | 0 | 5 |
| Nova Scotia (Flemming) | 0 | 0 | 0 | 2 | 0 | 0 | 0 | 3 | 0 | 0 | 1 | 6 |

| Sheet B | 1 | 2 | 3 | 4 | 5 | 6 | 7 | 8 | 9 | 10 | Final |
|---|---|---|---|---|---|---|---|---|---|---|---|
| New Brunswick (Howard) 🔨 | 3 | 0 | 1 | 0 | 4 | X | X | X | X | X | 8 |
| Northern Ontario (Patterson) | 0 | 1 | 0 | 1 | 0 | X | X | X | X | X | 2 |

| Sheet C | 1 | 2 | 3 | 4 | 5 | 6 | 7 | 8 | 9 | 10 | Final |
|---|---|---|---|---|---|---|---|---|---|---|---|
| Alberta (Hunka) 🔨 | 0 | 2 | 0 | 1 | 0 | 2 | 0 | 5 | X | X | 10 |
| Prince Edward Island (Campbell) | 0 | 0 | 2 | 0 | 2 | 0 | 1 | 0 | X | X | 5 |

| Sheet D | 1 | 2 | 3 | 4 | 5 | 6 | 7 | 8 | 9 | 10 | Final |
|---|---|---|---|---|---|---|---|---|---|---|---|
| British Columbia (Gretzinger) 🔨 | 2 | 0 | 3 | 0 | 0 | 0 | 0 | 1 | 0 | 1 | 7 |
| Yukon (Peech) | 0 | 1 | 0 | 1 | 0 | 0 | 0 | 0 | 2 | 0 | 4 |

=== Draw 7 ===
Monday, March 8, 1:00 pm

| Sheet A | 1 | 2 | 3 | 4 | 5 | 6 | 7 | 8 | 9 | 10 | Final |
|---|---|---|---|---|---|---|---|---|---|---|---|
| Yukon (Peech) 🔨 | 1 | 0 | 0 | 1 | 0 | 2 | 0 | 2 | 0 | X | 6 |
| Newfoundland (Goss) | 0 | 4 | 0 | 0 | 3 | 0 | 2 | 0 | 1 | X | 10 |

| Sheet B | 1 | 2 | 3 | 4 | 5 | 6 | 7 | 8 | 9 | 10 | Final |
|---|---|---|---|---|---|---|---|---|---|---|---|
| Northern Ontario (Patterson) 🔨 | 0 | 0 | 0 | 0 | 0 | 0 | 0 | 2 | 0 | X | 2 |
| Saskatchewan (Shymko) | 0 | 0 | 0 | 0 | 2 | 0 | 2 | 0 | 1 | X | 5 |

| Sheet C | 1 | 2 | 3 | 4 | 5 | 6 | 7 | 8 | 9 | 10 | Final |
|---|---|---|---|---|---|---|---|---|---|---|---|
| Quebec (Hemmings) 🔨 | 0 | 1 | 0 | 0 | 0 | 1 | 2 | 0 | 4 | X | 8 |
| Alberta (Hunka) | 0 | 0 | 1 | 1 | 0 | 0 | 0 | 1 | 0 | X | 3 |

| Sheet D | 1 | 2 | 3 | 4 | 5 | 6 | 7 | 8 | 9 | 10 | Final |
|---|---|---|---|---|---|---|---|---|---|---|---|
| Nova Scotia (Flemming) 🔨 | 2 | 0 | 0 | 2 | 0 | 1 | 0 | 0 | 1 | 0 | 6 |
| Manitoba (Stoughton) | 0 | 0 | 3 | 0 | 2 | 0 | 1 | 1 | 0 | 2 | 9 |

=== Draw 8 ===
Monday, March 8, 6:30 pm

| Sheet A | 1 | 2 | 3 | 4 | 5 | 6 | 7 | 8 | 9 | 10 | Final |
|---|---|---|---|---|---|---|---|---|---|---|---|
| Prince Edward Island (Campbell) 🔨 | 1 | 0 | 1 | 0 | 2 | 0 | 0 | 0 | 1 | 0 | 5 |
| Quebec (Hemmings) | 0 | 1 | 0 | 1 | 0 | 1 | 1 | 1 | 0 | 1 | 6 |

| Sheet B | 1 | 2 | 3 | 4 | 5 | 6 | 7 | 8 | 9 | 10 | Final |
|---|---|---|---|---|---|---|---|---|---|---|---|
| Newfoundland (Goss) 🔨 | 1 | 0 | 0 | 0 | 2 | 0 | 2 | 0 | 2 | 0 | 7 |
| British Columbia (Gretzinger) | 0 | 0 | 1 | 1 | 0 | 3 | 0 | 2 | 0 | 1 | 8 |

| Sheet C | 1 | 2 | 3 | 4 | 5 | 6 | 7 | 8 | 9 | 10 | Final |
|---|---|---|---|---|---|---|---|---|---|---|---|
| Saskatchewan (Shymko) 🔨 | 0 | 2 | 0 | 1 | 0 | 0 | 1 | 0 | 1 | 2 | 7 |
| New Brunswick (Howard) | 0 | 0 | 2 | 0 | 0 | 3 | 0 | 0 | 0 | 0 | 5 |

| Sheet D | 1 | 2 | 3 | 4 | 5 | 6 | 7 | 8 | 9 | 10 | Final |
|---|---|---|---|---|---|---|---|---|---|---|---|
| Manitoba (Stoughton) 🔨 | 3 | 0 | 1 | 0 | 0 | 0 | 2 | 2 | X | X | 8 |
| Ontario (Moffatt) | 0 | 1 | 0 | 2 | 0 | 0 | 0 | 0 | X | X | 3 |

=== Draw 9 ===
Tuesday, March 9, 8:30 am

| Sheet A | 1 | 2 | 3 | 4 | 5 | 6 | 7 | 8 | 9 | 10 | Final |
|---|---|---|---|---|---|---|---|---|---|---|---|
| Alberta (Hunka) 🔨 | 0 | 0 | 2 | 2 | 0 | 2 | 0 | 0 | 2 | 1 | 9 |
| Saskatchewan (Shymko) | 0 | 0 | 0 | 0 | 3 | 0 | 4 | 0 | 0 | 0 | 7 |

| Sheet B | 1 | 2 | 3 | 4 | 5 | 6 | 7 | 8 | 9 | 10 | Final |
|---|---|---|---|---|---|---|---|---|---|---|---|
| Quebec (Hemmings) 🔨 | 0 | 1 | 0 | 2 | 1 | 0 | 1 | 0 | 1 | 1 | 7 |
| Northern Ontario (Patterson) | 2 | 0 | 2 | 0 | 0 | 2 | 0 | 2 | 0 | 0 | 8 |

| Sheet C | 1 | 2 | 3 | 4 | 5 | 6 | 7 | 8 | 9 | 10 | Final |
|---|---|---|---|---|---|---|---|---|---|---|---|
| Newfoundland (Goss) 🔨 | 0 | 1 | 0 | 0 | 2 | 1 | 0 | 0 | 1 | X | 5 |
| Nova Scotia (Flemming) | 1 | 0 | 2 | 0 | 0 | 0 | 2 | 2 | 0 | X | 7 |

| Sheet D | 1 | 2 | 3 | 4 | 5 | 6 | 7 | 8 | 9 | 10 | Final |
|---|---|---|---|---|---|---|---|---|---|---|---|
| Prince Edward Island (Campbell) 🔨 | 0 | 1 | 0 | 2 | 0 | 1 | 0 | 1 | 1 | X | 6 |
| New Brunswick (Howard) | 0 | 0 | 2 | 0 | 3 | 0 | 2 | 0 | 0 | X | 7 |

=== Draw 10 ===
Tuesday, March 9, 1:00 pm

| Sheet A | 1 | 2 | 3 | 4 | 5 | 6 | 7 | 8 | 9 | 10 | Final |
|---|---|---|---|---|---|---|---|---|---|---|---|
| New Brunswick (Howard) 🔨 | 3 | 0 | 1 | 1 | 1 | 0 | 3 | X | X | X | 9 |
| Newfoundland (Goss) | 0 | 1 | 0 | 0 | 0 | 2 | 0 | X | X | X | 3 |

| Sheet B | 1 | 2 | 3 | 4 | 5 | 6 | 7 | 8 | 9 | 10 | Final |
|---|---|---|---|---|---|---|---|---|---|---|---|
| Nova Scotia (Flemming) 🔨 | 1 | 1 | 0 | 2 | 1 | 2 | X | X | X | X | 7 |
| Prince Edward Island (Campbell) | 0 | 0 | 1 | 0 | 0 | 0 | X | X | X | X | 1 |

| Sheet C | 1 | 2 | 3 | 4 | 5 | 6 | 7 | 8 | 9 | 10 | Final |
|---|---|---|---|---|---|---|---|---|---|---|---|
| British Columbia (Gretzinger) 🔨 | 0 | 1 | 0 | 0 | 2 | 1 | 0 | 0 | 2 | 3 | 9 |
| Manitoba (Stoughton) | 1 | 0 | 0 | 3 | 0 | 0 | 1 | 0 | 0 | 0 | 5 |

| Sheet D | 1 | 2 | 3 | 4 | 5 | 6 | 7 | 8 | 9 | 10 | Final |
|---|---|---|---|---|---|---|---|---|---|---|---|
| Yukon (Peech) 🔨 | 1 | 0 | 0 | 2 | 0 | 2 | 0 | 0 | 1 | 1 | 7 |
| Ontario (Moffatt) | 0 | 2 | 1 | 0 | 3 | 0 | 2 | 0 | 0 | 0 | 8 |

=== Draw 11 ===
Tuesday, March 9, 6:30 pm

| Sheet A | 1 | 2 | 3 | 4 | 5 | 6 | 7 | 8 | 9 | 10 | Final |
|---|---|---|---|---|---|---|---|---|---|---|---|
| Ontario (Moffatt) 🔨 | 1 | 0 | 2 | 0 | 1 | 0 | 1 | 0 | 1 | 1 | 7 |
| Alberta (Hunka) | 0 | 1 | 0 | 2 | 0 | 2 | 0 | 1 | 0 | 0 | 6 |

| Sheet B | 1 | 2 | 3 | 4 | 5 | 6 | 7 | 8 | 9 | 10 | Final |
|---|---|---|---|---|---|---|---|---|---|---|---|
| Saskatchewan (Shymko) 🔨 | 0 | 0 | 1 | 0 | 2 | 1 | 0 | 2 | 0 | 1 | 7 |
| Yukon (Peech) | 1 | 2 | 0 | 1 | 0 | 0 | 0 | 0 | 1 | 0 | 5 |

| Sheet C | 1 | 2 | 3 | 4 | 5 | 6 | 7 | 8 | 9 | 10 | Final |
|---|---|---|---|---|---|---|---|---|---|---|---|
| Northern Ontario (Patterson) 🔨 | 0 | 0 | 0 | 0 | 0 | 2 | 0 | 0 | 2 | X | 4 |
| British Columbia (Gretzinger) | 0 | 0 | 0 | 0 | 0 | 0 | 1 | 0 | 0 | X | 1 |

| Sheet D | 1 | 2 | 3 | 4 | 5 | 6 | 7 | 8 | 9 | 10 | Final |
|---|---|---|---|---|---|---|---|---|---|---|---|
| Manitoba (Stoughton) 🔨 | 1 | 0 | 2 | 0 | 1 | 0 | 0 | 1 | 1 | 1 | 7 |
| Quebec (Hemmings) | 0 | 1 | 0 | 2 | 0 | 0 | 1 | 0 | 0 | 0 | 4 |

=== Draw 12 ===
Wednesday, March 10, 8:30 am

| Sheet A | 1 | 2 | 3 | 4 | 5 | 6 | 7 | 8 | 9 | 10 | Final |
|---|---|---|---|---|---|---|---|---|---|---|---|
| Saskatchewan (Shymko) 🔨 | 2 | 0 | 0 | 1 | 0 | 2 | 0 | 1 | 0 | 1 | 7 |
| Manitoba (Stoughton) | 0 | 1 | 0 | 0 | 1 | 0 | 2 | 0 | 2 | 0 | 6 |

| Sheet B | 1 | 2 | 3 | 4 | 5 | 6 | 7 | 8 | 9 | 10 | Final |
|---|---|---|---|---|---|---|---|---|---|---|---|
| Alberta (Hunka) 🔨 | 1 | 0 | 0 | 2 | 0 | 1 | 0 | 1 | 0 | X | 5 |
| British Columbia (Gretzinger) | 0 | 2 | 1 | 0 | 1 | 0 | 1 | 0 | 2 | X | 7 |

| Sheet C | 1 | 2 | 3 | 4 | 5 | 6 | 7 | 8 | 9 | 10 | 11 | Final |
|---|---|---|---|---|---|---|---|---|---|---|---|---|
| Prince Edward Island (Campbell) 🔨 | 1 | 0 | 2 | 0 | 2 | 0 | 2 | 0 | 1 | 0 | 1 | 9 |
| Yukon (Peech) | 0 | 2 | 0 | 2 | 0 | 2 | 0 | 1 | 0 | 1 | 0 | 8 |

| Sheet D | 1 | 2 | 3 | 4 | 5 | 6 | 7 | 8 | 9 | 10 | 11 | Final |
|---|---|---|---|---|---|---|---|---|---|---|---|---|
| Ontario (Moffatt) 🔨 | 2 | 0 | 1 | 1 | 0 | 0 | 0 | 1 | 0 | 0 | 1 | 6 |
| Northern Ontario (Patterson) | 0 | 1 | 0 | 0 | 1 | 1 | 0 | 0 | 1 | 1 | 0 | 5 |

=== Draw 13 ===
Wednesday, March 10, 1:00 pm

| Sheet A | 1 | 2 | 3 | 4 | 5 | 6 | 7 | 8 | 9 | 10 | Final |
|---|---|---|---|---|---|---|---|---|---|---|---|
| Quebec (Hemmings) 🔨 | 0 | 0 | 3 | 0 | 0 | 0 | 0 | 0 | 0 | X | 3 |
| Newfoundland (Goss) | 0 | 2 | 0 | 0 | 1 | 0 | 1 | 2 | 2 | X | 8 |

| Sheet B | 1 | 2 | 3 | 4 | 5 | 6 | 7 | 8 | 9 | 10 | Final |
|---|---|---|---|---|---|---|---|---|---|---|---|
| New Brunswick (Howard) 🔨 | 1 | 0 | 1 | 0 | 2 | 0 | 0 | 0 | 0 | 1 | 5 |
| Ontario (Moffatt) | 0 | 0 | 0 | 1 | 0 | 1 | 1 | 1 | 0 | 0 | 4 |

| Sheet C | 1 | 2 | 3 | 4 | 5 | 6 | 7 | 8 | 9 | 10 | Final |
|---|---|---|---|---|---|---|---|---|---|---|---|
| Nova Scotia (Flemming) 🔨 | 0 | 0 | 0 | 1 | 0 | 1 | 0 | 1 | X | X | 3 |
| Saskatchewan (Shymko) | 0 | 0 | 1 | 0 | 1 | 0 | 5 | 0 | X | X | 7 |

| Sheet D | 1 | 2 | 3 | 4 | 5 | 6 | 7 | 8 | 9 | 10 | Final |
|---|---|---|---|---|---|---|---|---|---|---|---|
| British Columbia (Gretzinger) 🔨 | 0 | 1 | 0 | 2 | 0 | 1 | 0 | 0 | 1 | 0 | 5 |
| Prince Edward Island (Campbell) | 0 | 0 | 2 | 0 | 1 | 0 | 1 | 1 | 0 | 2 | 7 |

=== Draw 14 ===
Wednesday, March 10, 6:30 pm

| Sheet A | 1 | 2 | 3 | 4 | 5 | 6 | 7 | 8 | 9 | 10 | Final |
|---|---|---|---|---|---|---|---|---|---|---|---|
| Yukon (Peech) 🔨 | 0 | 0 | 0 | 0 | 1 | 0 | X | X | X | X | 1 |
| Quebec (Hemmings) | 1 | 1 | 2 | 4 | 0 | 5 | X | X | X | X | 13 |

| Sheet B | 1 | 2 | 3 | 4 | 5 | 6 | 7 | 8 | 9 | 10 | Final |
|---|---|---|---|---|---|---|---|---|---|---|---|
| Newfoundland (Goss) 🔨 | 1 | 0 | 2 | 1 | 0 | 0 | 0 | 1 | 0 | 2 | 7 |
| Alberta (Hunka) | 0 | 2 | 0 | 0 | 1 | 0 | 1 | 0 | 2 | 0 | 6 |

| Sheet C | 1 | 2 | 3 | 4 | 5 | 6 | 7 | 8 | 9 | 10 | Final |
|---|---|---|---|---|---|---|---|---|---|---|---|
| Manitoba (Stoughton) 🔨 | 2 | 0 | 1 | 0 | 2 | 0 | 1 | 1 | 0 | 0 | 7 |
| New Brunswick (Howard) | 0 | 2 | 0 | 2 | 0 | 1 | 0 | 0 | 1 | 0 | 6 |

| Sheet D | 1 | 2 | 3 | 4 | 5 | 6 | 7 | 8 | 9 | 10 | Final |
|---|---|---|---|---|---|---|---|---|---|---|---|
| Northern Ontario (Patterson) 🔨 | 0 | 1 | 0 | 0 | 0 | 0 | 0 | 2 | 0 | 0 | 3 |
| Nova Scotia (Flemming) | 0 | 0 | 0 | 1 | 0 | 1 | 1 | 0 | 0 | 2 | 5 |

=== Draw 15 ===
Thursday, March 11, 8:30 am

| Sheet A | 1 | 2 | 3 | 4 | 5 | 6 | 7 | 8 | 9 | 10 | 11 | Final |
|---|---|---|---|---|---|---|---|---|---|---|---|---|
| Nova Scotia (Flemming) 🔨 | 0 | 3 | 0 | 0 | 2 | 0 | 0 | 1 | 0 | 0 | 1 | 7 |
| British Columbia (Gretzinger) | 0 | 0 | 0 | 2 | 0 | 1 | 1 | 0 | 1 | 1 | 0 | 6 |

| Sheet B | 1 | 2 | 3 | 4 | 5 | 6 | 7 | 8 | 9 | 10 | Final |
|---|---|---|---|---|---|---|---|---|---|---|---|
| Manitoba (Stoughton) 🔨 | 0 | 0 | 0 | 0 | 4 | 0 | 0 | 4 | 0 | X | 6 |
| Yukon (Peech) | 1 | 0 | 1 | 0 | 0 | 1 | 0 | 0 | 1 | X | 4 |

| Sheet C | 1 | 2 | 3 | 4 | 5 | 6 | 7 | 8 | 9 | 10 | 11 | Final |
|---|---|---|---|---|---|---|---|---|---|---|---|---|
| Ontario (Moffatt) 🔨 | 1 | 2 | 0 | 0 | 2 | 0 | 0 | 0 | 3 | 0 | 1 | 9 |
| Newfoundland (Goss) | 0 | 0 | 3 | 1 | 0 | 1 | 0 | 2 | 0 | 1 | 0 | 8 |

| Sheet D | 1 | 2 | 3 | 4 | 5 | 6 | 7 | 8 | 9 | 10 | Final |
|---|---|---|---|---|---|---|---|---|---|---|---|
| New Brunswick (Howard) 🔨 | 1 | 0 | 0 | 0 | 1 | 0 | 1 | 1 | 0 | X | 4 |
| Quebec (Hemmings) | 0 | 2 | 2 | 2 | 0 | 1 | 0 | 0 | 1 | X | 8 |

=== Draw 16 ===
Thursday, March 11, 1:00 pm

| Sheet A | 1 | 2 | 3 | 4 | 5 | 6 | 7 | 8 | 9 | 10 | Final |
|---|---|---|---|---|---|---|---|---|---|---|---|
| Northern Ontario (Patterson) 🔨 | 0 | 2 | 1 | 0 | 0 | 1 | 0 | 1 | 1 | X | 6 |
| Alberta (Hunka) | 0 | 0 | 0 | 2 | 1 | 0 | 1 | 0 | 0 | X | 4 |

| Sheet B | 1 | 2 | 3 | 4 | 5 | 6 | 7 | 8 | 9 | 10 | Final |
|---|---|---|---|---|---|---|---|---|---|---|---|
| Prince Edward Island (Campbell) 🔨 | 2 | 0 | 1 | 0 | 2 | 0 | 1 | 0 | 1 | 0 | 7 |
| Manitoba (Stoughton) | 0 | 2 | 0 | 2 | 0 | 1 | 0 | 2 | 0 | 1 | 8 |

| Sheet C | 1 | 2 | 3 | 4 | 5 | 6 | 7 | 8 | 9 | 10 | Final |
|---|---|---|---|---|---|---|---|---|---|---|---|
| Quebec (Hemmings) 🔨 | 0 | 0 | 0 | 2 | 0 | 0 | 3 | 0 | 1 | 1 | 7 |
| Ontario (Moffatt) | 0 | 0 | 1 | 0 | 0 | 1 | 0 | 2 | 0 | 0 | 4 |

| Sheet D | 1 | 2 | 3 | 4 | 5 | 6 | 7 | 8 | 9 | 10 | Final |
|---|---|---|---|---|---|---|---|---|---|---|---|
| British Columbia (Gretzinger) 🔨 | 0 | 1 | 0 | 1 | 0 | 1 | 0 | 1 | 0 | 0 | 4 |
| Saskatchewan (Shymko) | 0 | 0 | 3 | 0 | 0 | 0 | 0 | 0 | 0 | 2 | 5 |

=== Draw 17 ===
Thursday, March 11, 6:30 pm

| Sheet A | 1 | 2 | 3 | 4 | 5 | 6 | 7 | 8 | 9 | 10 | Final |
|---|---|---|---|---|---|---|---|---|---|---|---|
| Saskatchewan (Shymko) 🔨 | 2 | 0 | 0 | 0 | 1 | 1 | 0 | 0 | 1 | 0 | 5 |
| Prince Edward Island (Campbell) | 0 | 2 | 2 | 0 | 0 | 0 | 1 | 2 | 0 | 1 | 8 |

| Sheet B | 1 | 2 | 3 | 4 | 5 | 6 | 7 | 8 | 9 | 10 | 11 | Final |
|---|---|---|---|---|---|---|---|---|---|---|---|---|
| Yukon (Peech) 🔨 | 0 | 2 | 0 | 1 | 1 | 0 | 0 | 1 | 1 | 0 | 0 | 6 |
| New Brunswick (Howard) | 1 | 0 | 1 | 0 | 0 | 1 | 2 | 0 | 0 | 1 | 1 | 7 |

| Sheet C | 1 | 2 | 3 | 4 | 5 | 6 | 7 | 8 | 9 | 10 | Final |
|---|---|---|---|---|---|---|---|---|---|---|---|
| Alberta (Hunka) 🔨 | 0 | 3 | 0 | 2 | 0 | 1 | 0 | 2 | 2 | X | 10 |
| Nova Scotia (Flemming) | 0 | 0 | 2 | 0 | 2 | 0 | 1 | 0 | 0 | X | 5 |

| Sheet D | 1 | 2 | 3 | 4 | 5 | 6 | 7 | 8 | 9 | 10 | Final |
|---|---|---|---|---|---|---|---|---|---|---|---|
| Newfoundland (Goss) 🔨 | 2 | 0 | 0 | 1 | 0 | 1 | 0 | 2 | 0 | X | 6 |
| Northern Ontario (Patterson) | 0 | 3 | 1 | 0 | 2 | 0 | 2 | 0 | 1 | X | 9 |

== Tiebreaker ==
Friday, March 12, 8:30 am

| Sheet B | 1 | 2 | 3 | 4 | 5 | 6 | 7 | 8 | 9 | 10 | Final |
|---|---|---|---|---|---|---|---|---|---|---|---|
| New Brunswick (Howard) | 0 | 1 | 1 | 0 | 2 | 1 | 0 | 0 | 0 | 0 | 5 |
| Nova Scotia (Flemming) 🔨 | 1 | 0 | 0 | 1 | 0 | 0 | 0 | 0 | 1 | 1 | 4 |

Player percentages
| New Brunswick | | Nova Scotia | |
|---|---|---|---|
| Jeff Lacey | 73% | Tom Fetterly | 89% |
| Rick Perron | 89% | Andrew Dauphinee | 86% |
| Wayne Tallon | 94% | Blayne Iskiw | 79% |
| Russ Howard | 99% | Paul Flemming | 70% |
| Total | 90% | Total | 81% |

== Playoffs ==
Page playoff system
1 | Manitoba | 6
2 | Quebec | 4
3 | Saskatchewan | 6
4 | New Brunswick | 4

Semifinal
2 | Quebec | 6
3 | Saskatchewan | 5

Final
1 | Manitoba | 9
2 | Quebec | 5

=== 3 vs. 4 ===
Friday, March 12, 1:00 pm

| Sheet B | 1 | 2 | 3 | 4 | 5 | 6 | 7 | 8 | 9 | 10 | Final |
|---|---|---|---|---|---|---|---|---|---|---|---|
| Saskatchewan (Shymko) 🔨 | 0 | 1 | 0 | 0 | 2 | 0 | 2 | 0 | 1 | X | 6 |
| New Brunswick (Howard) | 0 | 0 | 0 | 1 | 0 | 2 | 0 | 1 | 0 | X | 4 |

Player percentages
| Saskatchewan | | New Brunswick | |
|---|---|---|---|
| Neil Cursons | 91% | Grant Odishaw | 90% |
| Arnie Geisler | 85% | Rick Perron | 78% |
| Gerry Adam | 90% | Wayne Tallon | 74% |
| Gerald Shymko | 91% | Russ Howard | 86% |
| Total | 89% | Total | 82% |

=== 1 vs. 2 ===
Friday, March 12, 6:30 pm

| Sheet B | 1 | 2 | 3 | 4 | 5 | 6 | 7 | 8 | 9 | 10 | Final |
|---|---|---|---|---|---|---|---|---|---|---|---|
| Manitoba (Stoughton) 🔨 | 2 | 0 | 0 | 0 | 0 | 1 | 0 | 2 | 0 | 1 | 6 |
| Quebec (Hemmings) | 0 | 2 | 0 | 0 | 0 | 0 | 1 | 0 | 1 | 0 | 4 |

Player percentages
| Manitoba | | Quebec | |
|---|---|---|---|
| Doug Armstrong | 75% | Dale Ness | 99% |
| Garry Van Den Berghe | 90% | Guy Thibaudeau | 84% |
| Jon Mead | 81% | Pierre Charette | 74% |
| Jeff Stoughton | 74% | Guy Hemmings | 81% |
| Total | 80% | Total | 84% |

=== Semifinal ===
Saturday, March 13, 12:30 pm

| Sheet B | 1 | 2 | 3 | 4 | 5 | 6 | 7 | 8 | 9 | 10 | 11 | Final |
|---|---|---|---|---|---|---|---|---|---|---|---|---|
| Quebec (Hemmings) 🔨 | 0 | 2 | 0 | 0 | 0 | 2 | 0 | 0 | 1 | 0 | 1 | 6 |
| Saskatchewan (Shymko) | 0 | 0 | 2 | 0 | 0 | 0 | 1 | 0 | 0 | 2 | 0 | 5 |

Player percentages
| Quebec | | Saskatchewan | |
|---|---|---|---|
| Dale Ness | 76% | Neil Cursons | 85% |
| Guy Thibaudeau | 78% | Arnie Geisler | 76% |
| Pierre Charette | 75% | Gerry Adam | 88% |
| Guy Hemmings | 86% | Gerald Shymko | 84% |
| Total | 79% | Total | 83% |

=== Final ===
Sunday, March 14, 11:30 am

| Sheet B | 1 | 2 | 3 | 4 | 5 | 6 | 7 | 8 | 9 | 10 | Final |
|---|---|---|---|---|---|---|---|---|---|---|---|
| Manitoba (Stoughton) 🔨 | 1 | 0 | 2 | 0 | 2 | 1 | 0 | 3 | 0 | X | 9 |
| Quebec (Hemmings) | 0 | 2 | 0 | 2 | 0 | 0 | 1 | 0 | 0 | X | 5 |

Player percentages
| Manitoba | | Quebec | |
|---|---|---|---|
| Doug Armstrong | 92% | Dale Ness | 94% |
| Garry Van Den Berghe | 83% | Guy Thibaudeau | 74% |
| Jon Mead | 86% | Pierre Charette | 80% |
| Jeff Stoughton | 92% | Guy Hemmings | 79% |
| Total | 88% | Total | 82% |

== Statistics ==
=== Top 5 player percentages ===
Round robin only

Key
| First All-Star Team |
| Second All-Star Team |

| Leads | % |
|---|---|
| (Quebec) Dale Ness | 89 |
| (Saskatchewan) Neil Cursons | 88 |
| (Ontario) Paul Madden | 87 |
| (Alberta) Wade Johnston | 86 |
| (Manitoba) Doug Armstrong | 85 |
| (British Columbia) Dave Mellof | 85 |

| Seconds | % |
|---|---|
| (Ontario) Chris Fulton | 85 |
| (New Brunswick) Rick Perron | 84 |
| (Alberta) Blake MacDonald | 83 |
| (Northern Ontario) John McClelland | 82 |
| (Manitoba) Garry Van Den Berghe | 81 |
| (Prince Edward Island) Mark O'Rourke | 81 |

| Thirds | % |
|---|---|
| (British Columbia) Bob Ursel | 83 |
| (Ontario) Howard Rajala | 83 |
| (Quebec) Pierre Charette | 82 |
| (Prince Edward Island) Peter Gallant | 82 |
| (Manitoba) Jon Mead | 81 |
| (Nova Scotia) Blayne Iskiw | 81 |
| (Saskatchewan) Gerry Adam | 81 |

| Skips | % |
|---|---|
| (Nova Scotia) Paul Flemming | 83 |
| (Manitoba) Jeff Stoughton | 83 |
| (British Columbia) Bert Gretzinger | 83 |
| (New Brunswick) Russ Howard | 81 |
| (Saskatchewan) Gerald Shymko | 80 |
| (Alberta) Ken Hunka | 80 |

=== Perfect games ===
Round robin only; minimum 10 shots thrown

| Player | Team | Position | Shots | Opponent |
|---|---|---|---|---|
| Grant Odishaw | New Brunswick | Third | 10 | Northern Ontario |
| Pierre Charette | Quebec | Third | 18 | New Brunswick |

== Awards ==
=== All-Star teams ===
The All-Star Teams were as follows:

First Team
| Position | Name | Team |
|---|---|---|
| Skip | Paul Flemming | Nova Scotia |
| Third | Pierre Charette | Quebec |
| Second | Chris Fulton | Ontario |
| Lead | Dale Ness | Quebec |

Second Team
| Position | Name | Team |
|---|---|---|
| Skip | Jeff Stoughton | Manitoba |
| Third | Bob Ursel | Alberta |
| Second | Rick Perron (2) | New Brunswick |
| Lead | Neil Cursons | Saskatchewan |

=== Ross Harstone Sportsmanship Award ===
The Ross Harstone Sportsmanship Award is presented to the player chosen by their fellow peers as the curler who best represented Harstone's high ideals of good sportsmanship, observance of the rules, exemplary conduct and curling ability.

| Name | Position | Team |
|---|---|---|
| Gerald Shymko | Skip | Saskatchewan |

=== Hec Gervais Most Valuable Player Award ===
The Hec Gervais Most Valuable Player Award was awarded to the top player in the playoff round by members of the media.

| Name | Position | Team |
|---|---|---|
| Jeff Stoughton | Skip | Manitoba |
