= 2026 New Brunswick Tankard =

Canadian provincial men's curling championship

- Host city: Oromocto, New Brunswick
- Arena: Gage Golf and Curling Club
- Dates: January 28 – February 1
- Winner: Team Grattan
- Curling club: Gage G&CC, Oromocto
- Skip: James Grattan
- Third: Joel Krats
- Second: Andy McCann
- Lead: Noah Riggs
- Coach: Dean Grattan
- Finalist: Jamie Stewart

The 2026 New Brunswick Tankard, the provincial men's curling championship for New Brunswick, was held from January 28 to February 1 at the Gage Golf and Curling Club in Oromocto, New Brunswick. The winning James Grattan rink represented New Brunswick at the 2026 Montana's Brier in St. John's, Newfoundland and Labrador.

== Teams ==
The teams are listed as follows:

| Skip | Third | Second | Lead | Alternate | Coach | Club |
|---|---|---|---|---|---|---|
| Ryan Cain | Chris McCann | Trevor Crouse | Mike Flannery Jr. | | | Capital WC, Fredericton |
| Travis Colter | Jack Smeltzer | Alex Peasley | Michael Donovan | Mitchell Small | | Curl Moncton, Moncton |
| James Grattan | Joel Krats | Andy McCann | Noah Riggs | | Dean Grattan | Gage G&CC, Oromocto |
| Rajan Dalrymple (Fourth) | Brody Hanson (Skip) | Drew Grattan | Shannon Fenelon | | | Capital WC, Fredericton |
| Trevor Hanson | Adam MacDonald | Scott Archibald | Joel Graham | Steve Christie | | Gage G&CC, Oromocto |
| Mark Harris | Brandon Harris | Jayme Shannon | Dan Mersereau | Jamie Bennett | | Gladstone CC, Fredericton Junction |
| Michael Hughes | Xander King | Sam Worden | Matt Hughes | | | Carleton CC, Carleton |
| Jeremy Mallais (Fourth) | Scott Jones (Skip) | Brian King | Jared Bezanson | Matt Stanley | | Curl Moncton, Moncton |
| Austen Matheson | Ron-Allen Elsinga | Dakari Rouselle | James Watson | | Colin Matheson | Woodstock G&CC, Woodstock |
| Matt Munro | Chris Cogswell | Adam Bowering | Kelly Harris | Chris Jenkins | | Gage G&CC, Oromocto |
| Grant Odishaw | Marc LeCocq | Sam Forestell | Vance LeCocq | | | Curl Moncton, Moncton |
| Colten Steele | Rene Comeau | Alex Robichaud | Cameron Sallaj | | | Capital WC, Fredericton |
| Jamie Stewart | Sean Beland | Aden Kavanaugh | James Carr | Luke Robichaud | Gary Wilson | Capital WC, Fredericton |
| Jason Vaughan | Spencer Mawhinney | Josh Vaughan | Paul Nason | Peter Case | | Thistle-St. Andrews CC, Saint John |

== Knockout Brackets ==
=== A Event ===
First Knockout | Qualifier 1
James Grattan | 9
Grant Odishaw | 8
Trevor Hanson | 1
Grant Odishaw | 10
James Grattan | 8
Colten Steele | 6
Travis Colter | 6
Matt Munro | 7
Matt Munro | 3
Colten Steele | 9
Colten Steele | 7
Michael Hughes | 2
James Grattan | 9
Scott Jones | 4
Jamie Stewart | 9
Mark Harris | 2
Jamie Stewart | 4
Brody Hanson | 10
Brody Hanson | 6
Ryan Cain | 4
Brody Hanson | 2
Scott Jones | 12
Austen Matheson | 10
Jason Vaughan | 3
Austen Matheson | 3
Scott Jones | 8

=== B Event ===
Second Knockout | Qualifier 2
Trevor Hanson | 7
Jamie Stewart | 6 | Trevor Hanson | 1
Colten Steele | 8 | Colten Steele | 10
Scott Jones | 7
Ryan Cain | 9 | Colten Steele | 3
Austen Matheson | 6 | James Grattan | 8
Ryan Cain | 9
Travis Colter | 8 | Brody Hanson | 5 | James Grattan | 8
Michael Hughes | 1 | Travis Colter | 1 | Ryan Cain | 10 | Ryan Cain | 0
Grant Odishaw | 8 | Jason Vaughan | 6
Grant Odishaw | 6
Mark Harris | 1 | Jason Vaughan | 7
Jason Vaughan | 15 | Jason Vaughan | 10
Matt Munro | 4

=== C Event ===
Third Knockout | Qualifier 3
Brody Hanson | 3 | Colten Steele | 4
Michael Hughes | 5 | Jamie Stewart | 10 | Ryan Cain | 6 | Jamie Stewart | 5
Jamie Stewart | 7 | Jamie Stewart | 8 | Jamie Stewart | 7
Trevor Hanson | 5 | Jamie Stewart | 3
Trevor Hanson | 9 | James Grattan | 9
Travis Colter | 6 | Travis Colter | 3
Matt Munro | 5 | James Grattan | 9
Scott Jones | 6 | Scott Jones | 3
Jason Vaughan | 5 | Grant Odishaw | 3
Grant Odishaw | 9 | Grant Odishaw | 11
Mark Harris | 4 | Austen Matheson | 6
Austen Matheson | 14

== Knockout Results ==
All draw times listed in Atlantic Time (UTC−04:00).

=== Draw 1 ===
Wednesday, January 28, 11:15 am

| Sheet 1 | 1 | 2 | 3 | 4 | 5 | 6 | 7 | 8 | 9 | 10 | Final |
|---|---|---|---|---|---|---|---|---|---|---|---|
| Trevor Hanson | 0 | 0 | 0 | 1 | 0 | 0 | 0 | X | X | X | 1 |
| Grant Odishaw 🔨 | 2 | 3 | 1 | 0 | 0 | 1 | 3 | X | X | X | 10 |

| Sheet 2 | 1 | 2 | 3 | 4 | 5 | 6 | 7 | 8 | 9 | 10 | Final |
|---|---|---|---|---|---|---|---|---|---|---|---|
| Brody Hanson 🔨 | 1 | 0 | 1 | 0 | 1 | 0 | 0 | 1 | 0 | 2 | 6 |
| Ryan Cain | 0 | 0 | 0 | 2 | 0 | 1 | 0 | 0 | 1 | 0 | 4 |

| Sheet 3 | 1 | 2 | 3 | 4 | 5 | 6 | 7 | 8 | 9 | 10 | Final |
|---|---|---|---|---|---|---|---|---|---|---|---|
| Austen Matheson | 0 | 0 | 2 | 2 | 1 | 0 | 4 | 1 | X | X | 10 |
| Jason Vaughan 🔨 | 2 | 0 | 0 | 0 | 0 | 1 | 0 | 0 | X | X | 3 |

| Sheet 4 | 1 | 2 | 3 | 4 | 5 | 6 | 7 | 8 | 9 | 10 | Final |
|---|---|---|---|---|---|---|---|---|---|---|---|
| Travis Colter 🔨 | 0 | 1 | 0 | 2 | 0 | 2 | 0 | 1 | 0 | 0 | 6 |
| Matt Munro | 0 | 0 | 0 | 0 | 3 | 0 | 3 | 0 | 0 | 1 | 7 |

=== Draw 2 ===
Wednesday, January 28, 4:15 pm

| Sheet 1 | 1 | 2 | 3 | 4 | 5 | 6 | 7 | 8 | 9 | 10 | Final |
|---|---|---|---|---|---|---|---|---|---|---|---|
| Austen Matheson | 0 | 1 | 0 | 0 | 1 | 0 | 1 | X | X | X | 3 |
| Scott Jones 🔨 | 2 | 0 | 2 | 2 | 0 | 2 | 0 | X | X | X | 8 |

| Sheet 2 | 1 | 2 | 3 | 4 | 5 | 6 | 7 | 8 | 9 | 10 | 11 | Final |
|---|---|---|---|---|---|---|---|---|---|---|---|---|
| James Grattan 🔨 | 1 | 0 | 5 | 0 | 1 | 0 | 1 | 0 | 0 | 0 | 1 | 9 |
| Grant Odishaw | 0 | 1 | 0 | 2 | 0 | 2 | 0 | 1 | 1 | 1 | 0 | 8 |

| Sheet 3 | 1 | 2 | 3 | 4 | 5 | 6 | 7 | 8 | 9 | 10 | Final |
|---|---|---|---|---|---|---|---|---|---|---|---|
| Jamie Stewart 🔨 | 3 | 0 | 3 | 1 | 1 | 0 | 1 | X | X | X | 9 |
| Mark Harris | 0 | 1 | 0 | 0 | 0 | 1 | 0 | X | X | X | 2 |

| Sheet 4 | 1 | 2 | 3 | 4 | 5 | 6 | 7 | 8 | 9 | 10 | Final |
|---|---|---|---|---|---|---|---|---|---|---|---|
| Colten Steele | 1 | 0 | 0 | 4 | 1 | 0 | 1 | 0 | X | X | 7 |
| Michael Hughes 🔨 | 0 | 1 | 0 | 0 | 0 | 0 | 0 | 1 | X | X | 2 |

=== Draw 3 ===
Wednesday, January 28, 9:15 pm

| Sheet 1 | 1 | 2 | 3 | 4 | 5 | 6 | 7 | 8 | 9 | 10 | Final |
|---|---|---|---|---|---|---|---|---|---|---|---|
| Travis Colter 🔨 | 2 | 1 | 1 | 0 | 1 | 2 | 1 | X | X | X | 8 |
| Michael Hughes | 0 | 0 | 0 | 1 | 0 | 0 | 0 | X | X | X | 1 |

| Sheet 2 | 1 | 2 | 3 | 4 | 5 | 6 | 7 | 8 | 9 | 10 | Final |
|---|---|---|---|---|---|---|---|---|---|---|---|
| Mark Harris | 0 | 0 | 0 | 0 | 1 | 0 | 0 | X | X | X | 1 |
| Jason Vaughan 🔨 | 1 | 2 | 2 | 3 | 0 | 6 | 1 | X | X | X | 15 |

| Sheet 3 | 1 | 2 | 3 | 4 | 5 | 6 | 7 | 8 | 9 | 10 | Final |
|---|---|---|---|---|---|---|---|---|---|---|---|
| Matt Munro | 0 | 0 | 0 | 1 | 1 | 0 | 1 | 0 | 0 | X | 3 |
| Colten Steele 🔨 | 0 | 0 | 3 | 0 | 0 | 3 | 0 | 1 | 2 | X | 9 |

| Sheet 4 | 1 | 2 | 3 | 4 | 5 | 6 | 7 | 8 | 9 | 10 | Final |
|---|---|---|---|---|---|---|---|---|---|---|---|
| Jamie Stewart | 0 | 0 | 1 | 0 | 1 | 0 | 2 | 0 | 0 | X | 4 |
| Brody Hanson 🔨 | 2 | 0 | 0 | 1 | 0 | 2 | 0 | 3 | 2 | X | 10 |

=== Draw 4.1 ===
Thursday, January 29, 9:30 am

| Sheet 4 | 1 | 2 | 3 | 4 | 5 | 6 | 7 | 8 | 9 | 10 | Final |
|---|---|---|---|---|---|---|---|---|---|---|---|
| Ryan Cain 🔨 | 2 | 1 | 0 | 2 | 2 | 0 | 0 | 2 | 0 | X | 9 |
| Austen Matheson | 0 | 0 | 2 | 0 | 0 | 2 | 1 | 0 | 1 | X | 6 |

=== Draw 4.2 ===
Thursday, January 29, 10:30 am

| Sheet 1 | 1 | 2 | 3 | 4 | 5 | 6 | 7 | 8 | 9 | 10 | Final |
|---|---|---|---|---|---|---|---|---|---|---|---|
| Jason Vaughan | 0 | 3 | 0 | 3 | 0 | 1 | 2 | 1 | X | X | 10 |
| Matt Munro 🔨 | 2 | 0 | 0 | 0 | 2 | 0 | 0 | 0 | X | X | 4 |

| Sheet 2 | 1 | 2 | 3 | 4 | 5 | 6 | 7 | 8 | 9 | 10 | 11 | Final |
|---|---|---|---|---|---|---|---|---|---|---|---|---|
| Trevor Hanson | 0 | 0 | 1 | 0 | 2 | 0 | 1 | 1 | 1 | 0 | 1 | 7 |
| Jamie Stewart 🔨 | 0 | 1 | 0 | 2 | 0 | 2 | 0 | 0 | 0 | 1 | 0 | 6 |

| Sheet 3 | 1 | 2 | 3 | 4 | 5 | 6 | 7 | 8 | 9 | 10 | Final |
|---|---|---|---|---|---|---|---|---|---|---|---|
| Travis Colter 🔨 | 1 | 0 | 0 | 0 | 0 | 0 | 0 | X | X | X | 1 |
| Grant Odishaw | 0 | 2 | 1 | 3 | 1 | 1 | 0 | X | X | X | 8 |

=== Draw 5 ===
Thursday, January 29, 2:45 pm

| Sheet 1 | 1 | 2 | 3 | 4 | 5 | 6 | 7 | 8 | 9 | 10 | Final |
|---|---|---|---|---|---|---|---|---|---|---|---|
| James Grattan 🔨 | 1 | 0 | 1 | 0 | 2 | 0 | 2 | 1 | 0 | 1 | 8 |
| Colten Steele | 0 | 3 | 0 | 1 | 0 | 1 | 0 | 0 | 1 | 0 | 6 |

| Sheet 2 | 1 | 2 | 3 | 4 | 5 | 6 | 7 | 8 | 9 | 10 | Final |
|---|---|---|---|---|---|---|---|---|---|---|---|
| Brody Hanson 🔨 | 0 | 0 | 0 | 0 | 0 | 2 | 0 | 0 | X | X | 2 |
| Scott Jones | 1 | 1 | 1 | 1 | 2 | 0 | 2 | 4 | X | X | 12 |

| Sheet 3 | 1 | 2 | 3 | 4 | 5 | 6 | 7 | 8 | 9 | 10 | Final |
|---|---|---|---|---|---|---|---|---|---|---|---|
| Mark Harris 🔨 | 3 | 0 | 0 | 0 | 1 | 0 | 0 | X | X | X | 4 |
| Austen Matheson | 0 | 3 | 3 | 1 | 0 | 4 | 3 | X | X | X | 14 |

| Sheet 4 | 1 | 2 | 3 | 4 | 5 | 6 | 7 | 8 | 9 | 10 | Final |
|---|---|---|---|---|---|---|---|---|---|---|---|
| Michael Hughes 🔨 | 0 | 1 | 0 | 0 | 0 | 1 | 0 | 2 | 0 | 1 | 5 |
| Jamie Stewart | 0 | 0 | 2 | 0 | 2 | 0 | 1 | 0 | 2 | 0 | 7 |

=== Draw 6 ===
Thursday, January 29, 7:45 pm

| Sheet 1 | 1 | 2 | 3 | 4 | 5 | 6 | 7 | 8 | 9 | 10 | Final |
|---|---|---|---|---|---|---|---|---|---|---|---|
| Ryan Cain 🔨 | 0 | 3 | 1 | 0 | 0 | 1 | 0 | 0 | 4 | X | 9 |
| Brody Hanson | 0 | 0 | 0 | 2 | 1 | 0 | 1 | 1 | 0 | X | 5 |

| Sheet 2 | 1 | 2 | 3 | 4 | 5 | 6 | 7 | 8 | 9 | 10 | 11 | Final |
|---|---|---|---|---|---|---|---|---|---|---|---|---|
| Grant Odishaw | 0 | 0 | 1 | 0 | 0 | 1 | 1 | 3 | 0 | 0 | 0 | 6 |
| Jason Vaughan 🔨 | 1 | 1 | 0 | 0 | 0 | 0 | 0 | 0 | 3 | 1 | 1 | 7 |

| Sheet 3 | 1 | 2 | 3 | 4 | 5 | 6 | 7 | 8 | 9 | 10 | Final |
|---|---|---|---|---|---|---|---|---|---|---|---|
| Trevor Hanson | 0 | 0 | 0 | 0 | 0 | 0 | 1 | 0 | X | X | 1 |
| Colten Steele 🔨 | 0 | 0 | 1 | 1 | 1 | 1 | 0 | 4 | X | X | 8 |

| Sheet 4 | 1 | 2 | 3 | 4 | 5 | 6 | 7 | 8 | 9 | 10 | Final |
|---|---|---|---|---|---|---|---|---|---|---|---|
| Travis Colter | 0 | 0 | 2 | 1 | 0 | 1 | 2 | 0 | 0 | X | 6 |
| Matt Munro 🔨 | 1 | 0 | 0 | 0 | 1 | 0 | 0 | 1 | 2 | X | 5 |

=== Draw 7 ===
Friday, January 30, 9:30 am

| Sheet 3 | 1 | 2 | 3 | 4 | 5 | 6 | 7 | 8 | 9 | 10 | Final |
|---|---|---|---|---|---|---|---|---|---|---|---|
| James Grattan 🔨 | 2 | 0 | 1 | 0 | 1 | 0 | 2 | 0 | 3 | X | 9 |
| Scott Jones | 0 | 1 | 0 | 1 | 0 | 1 | 0 | 1 | 0 | X | 4 |

| Sheet 4 | 1 | 2 | 3 | 4 | 5 | 6 | 7 | 8 | 9 | 10 | Final |
|---|---|---|---|---|---|---|---|---|---|---|---|
| Ryan Cain | 0 | 1 | 1 | 0 | 1 | 3 | 0 | 1 | 0 | 3 | 10 |
| Jason Vaughan 🔨 | 2 | 0 | 0 | 1 | 0 | 0 | 1 | 0 | 2 | 0 | 6 |

=== Draw 8 ===
Friday, January 30, 2:30 pm

| Sheet 1 | 1 | 2 | 3 | 4 | 5 | 6 | 7 | 8 | 9 | 10 | Final |
|---|---|---|---|---|---|---|---|---|---|---|---|
| Grant Odishaw 🔨 | 0 | 2 | 0 | 2 | 0 | 2 | 0 | 3 | 0 | X | 9 |
| Austen Matheson | 0 | 0 | 1 | 0 | 2 | 0 | 2 | 0 | 1 | X | 6 |

| Sheet 2 | 1 | 2 | 3 | 4 | 5 | 6 | 7 | 8 | 9 | 10 | Final |
|---|---|---|---|---|---|---|---|---|---|---|---|
| Trevor Hanson 🔨 | 0 | 2 | 1 | 0 | 1 | 1 | 0 | 0 | 4 | X | 9 |
| Travis Colter | 0 | 0 | 0 | 1 | 0 | 0 | 1 | 1 | 0 | X | 3 |

| Sheet 3 | 1 | 2 | 3 | 4 | 5 | 6 | 7 | 8 | 9 | 10 | Final |
|---|---|---|---|---|---|---|---|---|---|---|---|
| Brody Hanson | 0 | 0 | 0 | 1 | 0 | 2 | 0 | X | X | X | 3 |
| Jamie Stewart 🔨 | 3 | 2 | 1 | 0 | 2 | 0 | 2 | X | X | X | 10 |

| Sheet 4 | 1 | 2 | 3 | 4 | 5 | 6 | 7 | 8 | 9 | 10 | Final |
|---|---|---|---|---|---|---|---|---|---|---|---|
| Colten Steele 🔨 | 1 | 0 | 0 | 1 | 0 | 4 | 1 | 2 | 0 | 1 | 10 |
| Scott Jones | 0 | 2 | 0 | 0 | 3 | 0 | 0 | 0 | 2 | 0 | 7 |

=== Draw 9 ===
Friday, January 30, 7:30 pm

| Sheet 2 | 1 | 2 | 3 | 4 | 5 | 6 | 7 | 8 | 9 | 10 | Final |
|---|---|---|---|---|---|---|---|---|---|---|---|
| Jason Vaughan | 0 | 3 | 0 | 0 | 0 | 1 | 0 | 1 | 0 | X | 5 |
| Grant Odishaw 🔨 | 2 | 0 | 3 | 2 | 1 | 0 | 1 | 0 | 2 | X | 11 |

| Sheet 3 | 1 | 2 | 3 | 4 | 5 | 6 | 7 | 8 | 9 | 10 | Final |
|---|---|---|---|---|---|---|---|---|---|---|---|
| James Grattan | 0 | 1 | 2 | 1 | 1 | 2 | 1 | X | X | X | 8 |
| Ryan Cain 🔨 | 0 | 0 | 0 | 0 | 0 | 0 | 0 | X | X | X | 0 |

| Sheet 4 | 1 | 2 | 3 | 4 | 5 | 6 | 7 | 8 | 9 | 10 | Final |
|---|---|---|---|---|---|---|---|---|---|---|---|
| Jamie Stewart | 0 | 0 | 1 | 1 | 0 | 2 | 1 | 0 | 3 | X | 8 |
| Trevor Hanson 🔨 | 0 | 2 | 0 | 0 | 1 | 0 | 0 | 2 | 0 | X | 5 |

=== Draw 10 ===
Saturday, January 31, 2:00 pm

| Sheet 1 | 1 | 2 | 3 | 4 | 5 | 6 | 7 | 8 | 9 | 10 | Final |
|---|---|---|---|---|---|---|---|---|---|---|---|
| Colten Steele | 0 | 1 | 0 | 1 | 0 | 0 | 1 | X | X | X | 3 |
| James Grattan 🔨 | 1 | 0 | 4 | 0 | 2 | 1 | 0 | X | X | X | 8 |

| Sheet 2 | 1 | 2 | 3 | 4 | 5 | 6 | 7 | 8 | 9 | 10 | Final |
|---|---|---|---|---|---|---|---|---|---|---|---|
| Ryan Cain 🔨 | 1 | 0 | 0 | 3 | 0 | 0 | 1 | 0 | 1 | 0 | 6 |
| Jamie Stewart | 0 | 0 | 2 | 0 | 3 | 1 | 0 | 1 | 0 | 0 | 7 |

| Sheet 3 | 1 | 2 | 3 | 4 | 5 | 6 | 7 | 8 | 9 | 10 | Final |
|---|---|---|---|---|---|---|---|---|---|---|---|
| Scott Jones 🔨 | 0 | 0 | 1 | 0 | 0 | 1 | 1 | 0 | 2 | 1 | 6 |
| Grant Odishaw | 1 | 0 | 0 | 1 | 1 | 0 | 0 | 0 | 0 | 0 | 3 |

=== Draw 11 ===
Saturday, January 31, 7:00 pm

| Sheet 3 | 1 | 2 | 3 | 4 | 5 | 6 | 7 | 8 | 9 | 10 | Final |
|---|---|---|---|---|---|---|---|---|---|---|---|
| Colten Steele | 0 | 1 | 0 | 0 | 0 | 1 | 1 | 1 | 0 | 0 | 4 |
| Jamie Stewart 🔨 | 2 | 0 | 1 | 1 | 0 | 0 | 0 | 0 | 0 | 1 | 5 |

| Sheet 4 | 1 | 2 | 3 | 4 | 5 | 6 | 7 | 8 | 9 | 10 | Final |
|---|---|---|---|---|---|---|---|---|---|---|---|
| James Grattan 🔨 | 0 | 4 | 1 | 0 | 2 | 0 | 2 | X | X | X | 9 |
| Scott Jones | 0 | 0 | 0 | 2 | 0 | 1 | 0 | X | X | X | 3 |

=== Draw 12 ===
Sunday, February 1, 9:30 am

| Sheet 2 | 1 | 2 | 3 | 4 | 5 | 6 | 7 | 8 | 9 | 10 | Final |
|---|---|---|---|---|---|---|---|---|---|---|---|
| Jamie Stewart 🔨 | 0 | 0 | 1 | 0 | 1 | 0 | 1 | 0 | X | X | 3 |
| James Grattan | 0 | 0 | 0 | 2 | 0 | 3 | 0 | 4 | X | X | 9 |

== Playoffs ==
As Team Grattan won all 3 events, no playoff was required.

| Semifinal | | Final |
| | | A | James Grattan |
| B | James Grattan |
| C | James Grattan |

2026 New Brunswick Tankard

James Grattan
18th New Brunswick Provincial Championship title
