= Rick Perron =

Canadian curler

- Curler
- Born: June 12, 1957 (age 69); Moncton, New Brunswick

Curling career
- Member Association: New Brunswick
- Brier: 4 (1991, 1996 1999, 2000)
Medal record
Men's curling
Representing New Brunswick
Tim Hortons Brier
Silver medal – second place	2000 Saskatoon

Richard Perron (born June 12, 1957) is a Canadian curler from Moncton, New Brunswick. He won a silver medal at the 2000 Labatt Brier as second for Russ Howard.

== Career ==
Perron won his first New Brunswick Tankard in 1991. He was second on the team skipped by Gary Mitchell. They represented New Brunswick at the 1991 Labatt Brier in Hamilton, Ontario where they had a 4–7 record. He would win his second tankard in 1996 as lead for Mike Kennedy. He bettered his previous record by going 5–6 at the 1996 Labatt Brier in Kamloops, British Columbia. Perron finished second in the stats for leads.

Perron joined Russ Howard's team as second in 1998 with Wayne Tallon at third and Grant Odishaw as lead. They would win the provincial championship in back to back years in 1999 and 2000. At the 1999 Labatt Brier in Edmonton, they qualified for the playoffs with an 7–4 record before losing to Saskatchewan's Gerald Shymko in the 3 vs 4 game. He finished second in the stats for seconds as he did in 1996. Perron also won the Ford Hot Shots competition at this championship.

Team Howard started the 2000 Labatt Brier with a 1–2 record before quickly turning things around to finish the round robin in second with an 8–3 record. They lost the 1 vs 2 game to British Columbia but rebounded in the semifinal against Quebec to earn a spot in the final. They trailed 6–5 going into the ninth end but they missed their final shot of the end, giving up three and eventually losing the game by a final score of 9–5.

Aside from men's curling, Perron has represented New Brunswick seven times at the Canadian Mixed Curling Championships and won the event in 1994.

== Personal life ==
Perron was the head curling instructor at Curl Moncton in his hometown of Moncton.

== Teams ==
Season	Skip	Third	Second	Lead
1990–91	Gary Mitchell	Grant Odishaw	Rick Perron	Mike Butler
1995–96	Mike Kennedy	Grant Odishaw	Marc LeCocq	Rick Perron
1996–97	Mike Kennedy	Grant Odishaw	Marc LeCocq	Rick Perron
1998–99	Russ Howard	Wayne Tallon	Rick Perron	Grant Odishaw
1999–20	Russ Howard	Wayne Tallon	Rick Perron	Grant Odishaw
2000–01	Russ Howard	James Grattan	Rick Perron	Grant Odishaw
2008–09	Rick Perron	Scott Jones	Pierre Fraser	Jared Bezanson
2009–10	Marc LeCocq (Fourth)	Grant Odishaw (Skip)	Rick Perron	Jeff Lacey
2010–11	Rick Perron	Grant Odishaw	Marc LeCocq	Jeff Lacey
2013–14	Terry Odishaw	Grant Odishaw	Rick Perron	Dan Phillips
2014–15	Grant Odishaw	Rick Perron	Adam Firth	Robert Daley
2015–16	Rick Perron	Marcel Robichaud	Marc Belliveau	Scott Nealis
2016–17	Wayne Tallon	Rick Perron	Mike Flannery	Paul Nason
