= New Brunswick Tankard =

Annual curling tournament in Canada

- Established: 1927
- 2026 host city: Oromocto, New Brunswick
- 2026 arena: Gage Golf and Curling Club
- 2025 champion: James Grattan

Current edition
- 2026 New Brunswick Tankard

The New Brunswick Tankard is the New Brunswick provincial championship for men's curling. It was formerly called the Papa John's Pizza Tankard, Pepsi Tankard, Molson Canadian Men's Provincial Curling Championship, Alexander Keith's Tankard, the Labatt Tankard and Ganong Cup. The tournament is run by the New Brunswick Curling Association. The winner represents Team New Brunswick at The Brier.

== Winners ==
Year	Skip	Winning club
2026	James Grattan	Gage Golf and Curling Club
2025	James Grattan	Gage Golf and Curling Club
2024	James Grattan	Gage Golf and Curling Club
2023	Scott Jones	Curl Moncton
2022	James Grattan	Gage Golf and Curling Club
2021	Cancelled due to the COVID-19 pandemic in New Brunswick. Team James Grattan invited to represent New Brunswick at Brier	
2020	James Grattan	Gage Golf and Curling Club
2019	Terry Odishaw	Curl Moncton
2018	James Grattan	Gage Golf and Curling Club
2017	Mike Kennedy	Capital Winter Club
2016	Mike Kennedy	Grand Falls Curling Club
2015	Jeremy Mallais	Thistle-St. Andrew's Curling Club
2014	James Grattan	Gage Golf and Curling Club
2013	James Grattan	Gage Golf and Curling Club
2012	Terry Odishaw	Curl Moncton
2011	James Grattan	Gage Golf and Curling Club
2010	James Grattan	Gage Golf and Curling Club
2009	Russ Howard	Gage Golf and Curling Club
2008	James Grattan	Gage Golf and Curling Club
2007	Paul Dobson	Thistle-St. Andrew's Curling Club
2006	James Grattan	Gage Golf and Curling Club
2005	Wade Blanchard	Thistle St. Andrews
2004	Russ Howard	Beaver Curling Club
2003	Russ Howard	Beaver Curling Club
2002	Russ Howard	Beaver Curling Club
2001	Jim Sullivan	Thistle St. Andrews Curling Club
2000	Russ Howard	Beaver Curling Club
1999	Russ Howard	Beaver Curling Club
1998	Terry Odishaw	Moncton Curlers Association
1997	James Grattan	Thistle St. Andrews Curling Club
1996	Mike Kennedy	Beaver Curling Club
1995	Bryan MacPherson	Riverside Curling Club
1994	Brian Dobson	Thistle St. Andrews Curling Club
1993	Mike Kennedy	Edmundston Curling Club
1992	Mike Kennedy	Edmundston Curling Club
1991	Gary Mitchell	Beaver Curling Club
1990	Jim Sullivan	Capital Winter Club
1989	Gary Mitchell	Thistle St. Andrews Curling Club
1988	Steve Adams	Newcastle Curling Club
1987	Gary Mitchell	Thistle St. Andrews Curling Club
1986	Wade Blanchard	Thistle St. Andrews Curling Club
1985	Bryan Wight	Beaver Curling Club
1984	Arnie Dobson	Thistle St. Andrews Curling Club
1983	Charlie Sullivan, Sr.	Capital Winter Club
1982	Charlie Sullivan, Sr.	Capital Winter Club
1981	Don Mix	Beaver Curling Club
1980	Richard Belyea	Thistle St. Andrews Curling Club
1979	Richard Belyea	Thistle St. Andrews Curling Club
1978	Pete Murray	Thistle St. Andrews Curling Club
1977	Roly Mockler	Fredericton Curling Club
1976	Dave Sullivan	Capital Winter Club
1975	John Clark	Capital Winter Club
1974	John Clark	Capital Winter Club
1973	Louis Dugre	CFB Curtis Park Curling Club
1972	Dave Sullivan	Fredericton Curling Club
1971	Paul Bordage	Beausejour Curling Club
1970	Harold Mabey, Jr.	Moncton Curlers Association
1969	Harold Mabey, Jr.	Moncton Curlers Association
1968	Jim Ayer	Fredericton Curling Club
1967	Charlie Sullivan, Sr.	St. Andrews Curling Club
1966	Charlie Sullivan, Sr.	St. Andrews Curling Club
1965	Peter Lyons	Beausejour Curling Club
1964	Harold Mabey, Sr.	Moncton Curlers Association
1963	Don Mix	Beaver Curling Club
1962	Harold Mabey, Sr.	Moncton Curlers Association
1961	John McDonald	Campbellton Curling Club
1960	Harold Mabey, Sr.	Moncton Curlers Association
1959	Richard McCully	Beaver Curling Club
1958	Jim Vance	Beaver Curling Club
1957	Ken Everett	Carleton Curling Club
1956	Ralph Lister	Beaver Curling Club
1955	Edgar St. Pierre	Edmundston Curling Club
1954	Richard McCully	Beaver Curling Club
1953	Ralph Noble	Beaver Curling Club
1952	Vic Limerick	Fredericton Curling Club
1951	Nick Thobodeau	Bathurst Curling Club
1950	Jim Vance	Beaver Curling Club
1949	Rob Galloway	Newcastle Curling Club
1948	Henry Hollies	St. Andrews Curling Club
1947	Art Limerick	Fredericton Curling Club
1946	Fenwick McKelvey	St. Andrews Curling Club
1945	Not held	
1944	Dan Connolly	Bathurst Curling Club
1943	Not held	
1942	Dan Connolly	Bathurst Curling Club
1941	John Malcolm	Thistle Curling Club
1940	Nick Thibodeau	Bathurst Curling Club
1939	Judge Limerick	Fredericton Curling Club
1938	Dan Connolly	Bathurst Curling Club
1937	Charles Barry	Fredericton Curling Club
1936	Reginald Shives	Campbellton Curling Club
1935	Nick Thibodeau	Bathurst Curling Club
1934	Waldo Crocker	Newcastle Curling Club
1933	Johnny Malcolm	Thistle Curling Club
1932	Nick Thibodeau	Bathurst Curling Club
1931	Nick Thibodeau	Bathurst Curling Club
1930	Arthur McWha	St. Stephen Curling Club
1929	Wendell McDonald	Moncton Curlers Association
1928	Johnny Malcolm	Thistle Curling Club
1927	Johnny Malcolm	Saint John Composite Rink (assembled by the New Brunswick Curling Association)
