= Wayne Tallon =

Canadian curler

- Curler
- Born: May 22, 1956 (age 70); Rockland, Ontario, Canada

Team
- Skip: Wayne Tallon
- Third: Steve Soles
- Second: Dan Leblanc
- Lead: Dave McCafferty

Curling career
- Member Association: Ontario (1983-1987); New Brunswick (1998-2018)
- Brier: 3 (1999, 2000, 2006)
Medal record
Men's curling
Representing Canada
World Senior Curling Championships
Gold medal – first place	2014 Dumfries
Representing New Brunswick
Labatt Brier
Silver medal – second place	2000 Saskatoon

Wayne Tallon (born May 22, 1956) is a Canadian curler from Fredericton, New Brunswick. He is the 2013 Canadian Senior champion skip and 2014 World Senior champion skip.

== Career ==
=== Ontario ===
Tallon is originally from Ontario. Curling out of the Navy Curling Club in Ottawa, he won three Silver Regalia Tankards, in 1984, 1986 and 1987.

=== New Brunswick men's ===
Tallon would later move to New Brunswick, where he eventually teamed up with another ex-Ontarian in Russ Howard, who had beaten him in the 1986 Ontario championship finals. Tallon played third for the Howard rink that won the 1999 New Brunswick provincial men's championship. The team represented New Brunswick at the 1999 Labatt Brier where they finished in fourth place after losing to Saskatchewan's Gerald Shymko in the playoffs. The team won another provincial title in 2000, sending the team to the 2000 Labatt Brier. At the 2000 Brier, the team made it to the final, where they lost to British Columbia's Greg McAulay.

Tallon would later join the James Grattan rink at third. The team won a provincial title in 2006. At the 2006 Tim Hortons Brier, the team finished with a 5-6 record, tied for 8th.

=== Mixed ===
Tallon won the New Brunswick Mixed championship in 2000 and 2001 playing second for Russ Howard and won another title in 2003 as skip. These titles earned Tallon and his teams the right to represent New Brunswick at the Canadian Mixed Curling Championship for those years. In 2000, New Brunswick finished in fourth place after losing in the playoffs to Prince Edward Island. New Brunswick had less success in 2001, finishing 9th. In 2003, Tallon led New Brunswick to a tie-breaker loss against Ontario after posting a 6-5 round robin record.

=== Seniors ===
Tallon won New Brunswick Senior titles in 2008 and 2009 as third for Russ Howard and in 2013 as skip. Tallon thus played in the Canadian Senior Curling Championships those years. At the 2008 Canadian Senior Curling Championships, the team lost in the final to Saskatchewan's Eugene Hritzuk. The team lost in the final again at the 2009 Canadian Senior Curling Championships, this time losing to Ontario's Bruce Delaney, his former teammate. Tallon would find more success at the 2013 Canadian Senior Curling Championships when his team of Mike Kennedy, Mike Flannery, and Wade Blanchard won the event. The team lost just one game in the round robin, and then beat Ontario's Howard Rajala to capture the Canadian Senior championships. The team then went on to win the gold medal at the 2014 World Senior Curling Championships, defeating Sweden's Connie Östlund in the final.

== Personal life ==
Outside of curling, Tallon serves as the Director of Public Safety for the City of Fredericton.
