= Mike Kennedy (curler) =

Canadian curler (born 1962)

- Curler
- Born: August 6, 1962 (age 64); Edmundston, New Brunswick, Canada

Team
- Curling club: Grand Falls CC, Grand Falls, NB
- Skip: Mike Kennedy
- Third: Robert Desjardins
- Second: René Dubois
- Lead: Stewart Yaxley

Curling career
- Member Association: New Brunswick (1980–2025); Quebec (2026–present)
- Brier: 6 (1992, 1993, 1996, 2008, 2016, 2017)
- Top CTRS ranking: 52nd (2016–17)
Medal record
Men's Curling
Representing Canada
World Senior Curling Championships
Gold medal – first place	2014 Dumfries

Michael C. Kennedy (born August 6, 1962) is a Canadian curler from Edmundston, New Brunswick. He currently skips his own team out of Saguenay, Quebec.

== Curling career ==
=== Men's ===
As a junior curler, Kennedy won a provincial championship playing third for the Ron Healey rink in 1980.

Kennedy has been one of the perennial top skips in New Brunswick since the 1990s. Kennedy won his first provincial men's championship in 1992, earning the right to represent New Brunswick at the 1992 Labatt Brier. There, he led his team of Brad Fitzherbert, Tom Harris and Dave Coster to a 3-8 finish. The next year, Kennedy won another provincial title, this time with Mark LeCocq replacing Harris at second. The team improvinced on the 1992 performance, by finishing 5-6 at the 1993 Labatt Brier. Kennedy returned to the Brier in 1996 with new teammates Grant Odishaw and Rick Perron along with LeCocq. At the '96 Brier, Kennedy once again led New Brunswick to a 5-6 record.

Kennedy would not return to the Brier for another 12 years. This time Kennedy played third for the James Grattan rink. The team went 2-9 at the 2008 Tim Hortons Brier. Eight years later Kennedy would be back at the Brier, throwing skip rocks for New Brunswick at the 2016 Tim Hortons Brier with teammates Scott Jones, LeCocq and Jamie Brannen. There, they would finish with a 3-8 record. Kennedy would win back-to-back titles and return to represent New Brunswick at the 2017 Tim Hortons Brier, where they would finish a disappointing 1-10 record after round robin play.

=== Seniors ===
Kennedy is a former Canadian and World Senior Curling Champion. He won both the 2013 Canadian Senior Curling Championships and 2014 World Senior Curling Championships playing third for the Wayne Tallon rink. Kennedy has also won two provincial seniors titles, winning with Tallon in 2013 and playing third for Mark Armstrong in 2014.

== Personal life ==
Kennedy works as an IT Manager at Twin Rivers Paper Co. He is married and has three children.
