= 2012 Molson Canadian Men's Provincial Curling Championship =

- Host city: Saint John, New Brunswick
- Arena: Thistle St. Andrew Curling Club
- Dates: February 1–5
- Winner: Team Odishaw
- Curling club: Moncton CC, Moncton
- Skip: Terry Odishaw
- Third: Andy McCann
- Second: Scott Jones
- Lead: Grant Odishaw
- Finalist: James Grattan

The 2012 Molson Canadian Men's Provincial Curling Championship, the provincial men's curling championship for New Brunswick was held from February 1 to 5 at the Thistle St. Andrew Curling Club in Saint John, New Brunswick. The winning Terry Odishaw rink represented New Brunswick at the 2012 Tim Hortons Brier in Saskatoon, Saskatchewan.

== Teams ==
The teams are listed as follows:

Skip	Third	Second	Lead	Club(s)
Paul Dobson	Kevin Boyle	Mark Dobson	Spencer Mawhinney	Thistle St. Andrews CC, Saint John
Zach Eldridge	Chris Jeffrey	Adam Firth	Rob Daley	Campbellton CC, Campbellton
James Grattan	Charlie Sullivan	Steven Howard	Peter Case	Gage G&CC, Oromocto
Marc Lecocq	Mike Kennedy	Jamie Brannen	David Konefal	Nackawic CC, Nackawic
Jeremy Mallais	Jason Roach	Darren Roach	Jared Bezanson	Riverside CC, Rothesay
Terry Odishaw	Andy McCann	Scott Jones	Grant Odishaw	Moncton CC, Moncton
Gary Sullivan	Chris Smith	Kevin Loughery	Mark Hudson	Carleton CC, Saint John
Jason Vaughan	Mike Flemming	Stephen Burgess	Jeff Lacey	Thistle St. Andrews CC, Saint John

== Round Robin standings ==
Final Round Robin standings

Key
Teams to Playoffs
Teams to Tiebreakers

Skip	W	L	W–L	PF	PA	EW	EL	BE	SE
James Grattan	6	1	–	50	29	31	24	10	10
Terry Odishaw	4	3	2–1, 1-0	50	51	26	35	3	3
Marc Lecocq	4	3	2–1, 0-1	49	47	29	26	5	8
Jeremy Mallais	4	3	1–2, 1-0	44	34	26	22	10	9
Zach Eldridge	4	3	1–2, 0-1	43	41	29	23	4	13
Paul Dobson	3	4	–	53	46	30	33	3	5
Jason Vaughan	2	5	–	40	51	27	31	9	6
Gary Sullivan	1	6	–	30	58	24	24	2	6

== Round Robin results ==
All draw times listed in Atlantic Time (UTC−04:00).

=== Draw 1 ===
Wednesday, February 1, 2:00 pm

Sheet 4	1	2	3	4	5	6	7	8	9	10	Final
Marc Lecocq	0	0	1	0	3	0	2	0	X	X	6
Paul Dobson 🔨	2	1	0	1	0	5	0	4	X	X	13

Sheet 5	1	2	3	4	5	6	7	8	9	10	Final
Jason Vaughan 🔨	0	0	2	0	0	0	1	0	X	X	3
Jeremy Mallais	0	0	0	0	1	2	0	6	X	X	9

Sheet 6	1	2	3	4	5	6	7	8	9	10	Final
James Grattan	3	0	2	0	2	1	0	X	X	X	8
Gary Sullivan 🔨	0	1	0	1	0	0	1	X	X	X	3

Sheet 7	1	2	3	4	5	6	7	8	9	10	Final
Terry Odishaw	2	0	3	0	2	0	0	0	0	X	7
Zach Eldridge 🔨	0	2	0	2	0	1	1	3	2	X	11

=== Draw 2 ===
Wednesday, February 1, 7:00 pm

Sheet 4	1	2	3	4	5	6	7	8	9	10	Final
Gary Sullivan	0	1	2	1	0	1	X	X	X	X	5
Terry Odishaw 🔨	3	0	0	0	7	0	X	X	X	X	10

Sheet 5	1	2	3	4	5	6	7	8	9	10	Final
Zach Eldridge	0	0	1	0	1	0	0	1	1	0	4
James Grattan 🔨	0	0	0	1	0	2	1	0	0	3	7

Sheet 6	1	2	3	4	5	6	7	8	9	10	Final
Marc Lecocq	0	0	0	1	0	3	0	1	0	0	5
Jason Vaughan 🔨	0	0	0	0	2	0	2	0	3	2	9

Sheet 7	1	2	3	4	5	6	7	8	9	10	Final
Jeremy Mallais	0	0	1	1	0	1	1	0	0	X	4
Paul Dobson 🔨	2	0	0	0	2	0	0	3	1	X	8

=== Draw 3 ===
Thursday, February 2, 2:00 pm

Sheet 4	1	2	3	4	5	6	7	8	9	10	11	Final
James Grattan 🔨	1	0	2	0	0	0	0	0	0	1	0	4
Jeremy Mallais	0	1	0	0	1	0	1	0	1	0	1	5

Sheet 5	1	2	3	4	5	6	7	8	9	10	Final
Terry Odishaw	0	0	1	0	3	0	3	0	2	0	9
Marc Lecocq 🔨	2	1	0	2	0	3	0	1	0	1	10

Sheet 6	1	2	3	4	5	6	7	8	9	10	Final
Paul Dobson 🔨	1	0	2	0	1	0	0	0	1	0	5
Zach Eldridge	0	1	0	3	0	1	1	1	0	1	8

Sheet 7	1	2	3	4	5	6	7	8	9	10	Final
Jason Vaughan 🔨	1	2	0	2	0	1	1	0	0	X	7
Gary Sullivan	0	0	2	0	1	0	0	0	1	X	4

=== Draw 4 ===
Thursday, February 2, 7:00 pm

Sheet 4	1	2	3	4	5	6	7	8	9	10	Final
Zach Eldridge	0	1	0	0	2	1	1	0	1	1	7
Jason Vaughan 🔨	2	0	0	2	0	0	0	1	0	0	5

Sheet 5	1	2	3	4	5	6	7	8	9	10	Final
Gary Sullivan	0	1	0	1	0	1	1	0	0	1	5
Paul Dobson 🔨	1	0	1	0	1	0	0	0	1	0	4

Sheet 6	1	2	3	4	5	6	7	8	9	10	11	Final
Terry Odishaw	0	0	1	2	0	0	1	0	2	0	1	7
Jeremy Mallais 🔨	1	1	0	0	0	1	0	1	0	2	0	6

Sheet 7	1	2	3	4	5	6	7	8	9	10	Final
James Grattan	0	1	0	0	1	1	1	0	0	1	5
Marc Lecocq 🔨	1	0	1	0	0	0	0	1	1	0	4

=== Draw 5 ===
Friday, February 3, 2:00 pm

Sheet 4	1	2	3	4	5	6	7	8	9	10	11	Final
Marc Lecocq	1	0	1	1	0	0	0	4	1	0	1	9
Gary Sullivan 🔨	0	3	0	0	2	1	1	0	0	1	0	8

Sheet 5	1	2	3	4	5	6	7	8	9	10	Final
Jason Vaughan	0	2	0	1	1	0	1	0	1	0	6
Terry Odishaw 🔨	1	0	2	0	0	1	0	2	0	1	7

Sheet 6	1	2	3	4	5	6	7	8	9	10	Final
Paul Dobson	0	3	0	3	0	1	0	0	0	X	7
James Grattan 🔨	2	0	2	0	2	0	0	3	1	X	10

Sheet 7	1	2	3	4	5	6	7	8	9	10	Final
Jeremy Mallais 🔨	0	3	0	1	3	1	X	X	X	X	8
Zach Eldridge	1	0	0	0	0	0	X	X	X	X	1

=== Draw 6 ===
Friday, February 3, 7:00 pm

Sheet 4	1	2	3	4	5	6	7	8	9	10	Final
Terry Odishaw	0	3	0	1	0	1	0	1	1	X	7
Paul Dobson 🔨	2	0	2	0	1	0	1	0	0	X	6

Sheet 5	1	2	3	4	5	6	7	8	9	10	Final
Jeremy Mallais 🔨	0	3	0	3	0	4	X	X	X	X	10
Gary Sullivan	1	0	1	0	2	0	X	X	X	X	4

Sheet 6	1	2	3	4	5	6	7	8	9	10	Final
Zach Eldridge	0	1	0	1	0	0	X	X	X	X	2
Marc Lecocq 🔨	1	0	3	0	2	2	X	X	X	X	8

Sheet 7	1	2	3	4	5	6	7	8	9	10	Final
Jason Vaughan	0	0	1	0	0	1	0	1	0	X	3
James Grattan 🔨	0	1	0	2	1	0	1	0	4	X	9

=== Draw 7 ===
Saturday, February 4, 9:00 am

Sheet 4	1	2	3	4	5	6	7	8	9	10	Final
Gary Sullivan	0	1	0	0	0	X	X	X	X	X	1
Zach Eldridge 🔨	2	0	3	2	3	X	X	X	X	X	10

Sheet 5	1	2	3	4	5	6	7	8	9	10	11	Final
Paul Dobson	1	0	0	2	1	1	0	0	2	0	3	10
Jason Vaughan 🔨	0	1	1	0	0	0	3	1	0	1	0	7

Sheet 6	1	2	3	4	5	6	7	8	9	10	Final
James Grattan	0	1	1	0	1	0	2	0	2	X	7
Terry Odishaw 🔨	1	0	0	0	0	2	0	0	0	X	3

Sheet 7	1	2	3	4	5	6	7	8	9	10	Final
Marc Lecocq 🔨	0	1	0	3	2	0	1	X	X	X	7
Jeremy Mallais	0	0	1	0	0	1	0	X	X	X	2

== Tiebreakers ==
Saturday, February 4, 2:30 pm

Sheet 5	1	2	3	4	5	6	7	8	9	10	Final
Zach Eldridge 🔨	1	0	0	2	0	0	1	0	1	0	5
Terry Odishaw	0	2	0	0	0	1	0	1	0	2	6

Sheet 6	1	2	3	4	5	6	7	8	9	10	Final
Marc Lecocq 🔨	3	2	0	5	X	X	X	X	X	X	10
Jeremy Mallais	0	0	1	0	X	X	X	X	X	X	1

== Playoffs ==
Semifinal			Final
			1	James Grattan	3
2	Marc Lecocq	4	3	Terry Odishaw	10
3	Terry Odishaw	5

=== Semifinal ===
Saturday, February 4, 8:00 pm

Sheet 7	1	2	3	4	5	6	7	8	9	10	Final
Marc Lecocq 🔨	1	1	0	0	1	0	0	1	0	0	4
Terry Odishaw	0	0	1	0	0	1	2	0	0	1	5

=== Final ===
Sunday, February 5, 2:30 pm

Team	1	2	3	4	5	6	7	8	9	10	Final
James Grattan 🔨	1	0	0	1	0	0	1	0	X	X	3
Terry Odishaw	0	3	3	0	2	1	0	1	X	X	10

2012 Molson Canadian Men's Provincial Curling Championship

Terry Odishaw
New Brunswick Provincial Championship title
