= 2015 Pepsi Tankard =

Men's curling championship

- Host city: Fredericton Junction, New Brunswick
- Arena: Tri County Complex Arena
- Dates: January 28–February 1
- Winner: Team Mallais
- Curling club: Thistle-St. Andrews CC, Saint John
- Skip: Jeremy Mallais
- Third: Zach Eldridge
- Second: Chris Jeffrey
- Lead: Jared Bezanson
- Finalist: James Grattan

The 2015 Pepsi Tankard, the provincial men's curling championship of New Brunswick, was held January 28 to February 1 at the Tri County Complex Arena in Fredericton Junction, New Brunswick. The winning Jeremy Mallais rink represented New Brunswick at the 2015 Tim Hortons Brier in Calgary, Alberta.

== Teams ==
The teams are listed as follows:

Skip	Third	Second	Lead	Alternate	Club(s)
James Grattan	Jason Roach	Darren Roach	Peter Case		Thistle-St. Andrews CC, Saint John
Mike Kennedy	Brody Hanson	David Easter	Chris Smith		Grand Falls SC, Grand Falls
Jeremy Mallais	Zach Eldridge	Chris Jeffrey	Jared Bezanson		Thistle-St. Andrews CC, Saint John
Andy McCann	Marc Lecocq	Scott Jones	Jamie Brannen		Gladstone CC, Fredericton Junction
Grant Odishaw	Rick Perron	Adam Firth	Robert Daley		Curl Moncton, Moncton
Terry Odishaw	Paul Dobson	Mark Dobson	Spencer Mawhinney		Thistle-St. Andrews CC, Saint John
Wayne Tallon	Mike Flannery	Chris McCann	Mike Flannery Jr.	Chuck Kingston	Capital WC, Fredericton
Jason Vaughan	Charlie Sullivan	Brian King	Paul Nason		Thistle-St. Andrews CC, Saint John

== Round robin standings ==
Final Round Robin standings

Key
Teams to Playoffs

Skip	W	L	W–L	PF	PA
Jeremy Mallais	5	2	1–1	51	46
Jason Vaughan	5	2	1–1	39	33
James Grattan	5	2	1–1	47	35
Terry Odishaw	4	3	–	56	43
Andy McCann	2	4	1–0	29	40
Grant Odishaw	2	4	1–1	34	42
Wayne Tallon	2	4	0–1	40	47
Mike Kennedy	1	5	–	34	44

== Round Robin results ==
All draw times listed in Atlantic Time (UTC−04:00).

=== Draw 1 ===
Wednesday, January 28, 12:00 pm

Sheet 1	1	2	3	4	5	6	7	8	9	10	Final
Terry Odishaw	1	0	0	0	0	2	0	3	0	1	7
Mike Kennedy	0	2	0	0	0	0	1	0	1	0	4

Sheet 2	1	2	3	4	5	6	7	8	9	10	Final
Andy McCann	0	1	0	1	0	0	2	0	0	X	4
Jeremy Mallais	2	0	1	0	1	0	0	2	1	X	7

Sheet 3	1	2	3	4	5	6	7	8	9	10	Final
Jason Vaughan	3	0	0	2	0	0	0	1	0	0	6
Grant Odishaw	0	1	0	0	1	3	0	0	2	2	9

Sheet 4	1	2	3	4	5	6	7	8	9	10	Final
Wayne Tallon	2	0	1	0	1	0	1	0	1	0	6
James Grattan	0	2	0	2	0	2	0	1	0	2	9

=== Draw 2 ===
Wednesday, January 28, 7:00 pm

Sheet 1	1	2	3	4	5	6	7	8	9	10	Final
Jason Vaughan	1	0	2	1	0	1	0	0	1	X	6
Andy McCann	0	1	0	0	0	0	1	1	0	X	3

Sheet 2	1	2	3	4	5	6	7	8	9	10	Final
Wayne Tallon	2	0	3	0	2	0	3	0	X	X	10
Terry Odishaw	0	1	0	2	0	2	0	1	X	X	6

Sheet 3	1	2	3	4	5	6	7	8	9	10	Final
James Grattan	0	0	0	2	0	4	0	3	X	X	9
Mike Kennedy	0	2	0	0	1	0	1	0	X	X	4

Sheet 4	1	2	3	4	5	6	7	8	9	10	11	Final
Grant Odishaw	0	2	1	0	1	1	0	0	0	2	0	7
Jeremy Mallais	1	0	0	1	0	0	2	2	1	0	1	8

=== Draw 3 ===
Thursday, January 29, 8:00 am

Sheet 1	1	2	3	4	5	6	7	8	9	10	Final
Grant Odishaw	1	0	1	0	1	0	0	X	X	X	3
James Grattan	0	4	0	1	0	0	3	X	X	X	8

Sheet 2	1	2	3	4	5	6	7	8	9	10	Final
Jason Vaughan	0	2	0	0	1	1	0	0	1	1	6
Mike Kennedy	1	0	1	0	0	0	1	0	0	0	3

Sheet 3	1	2	3	4	5	6	7	8	9	10	11	Final
Wayne Tallon	2	0	0	1	0	3	0	1	0	0	1	8
Jeremy Mallais	0	0	2	0	2	0	1	0	1	1	0	7

Sheet 4	1	2	3	4	5	6	7	8	9	10	Final
Terry Odishaw	0	0	2	0	3	0	3	0	4	X	12
Andy McCann	1	0	0	2	0	1	0	1	0	X	5

=== Draw 4 ===
Thursday, January 29, 4:00 pm

Sheet 1	1	2	3	4	5	6	7	8	9	10	Final
Mike Kennedy	0	0	2	1	0	2	0	0	2	0	7
Jeremy Mallais	0	2	0	0	2	0	2	1	0	1	8

Sheet 2	1	2	3	4	5	6	7	8	9	10	Final
Terry Odishaw	0	1	3	0	5	X	X	X	X	X	9
Grant Odishaw	0	0	0	1	0	X	X	X	X	X	1

Sheet 3	1	2	3	4	5	6	7	8	9	10	Final
Andy McCann	0	0	1	1	0	0	0	2	0	0	4
James Grattan 🔨	2	0	0	0	0	0	0	0	2	1	5

Sheet 4	1	2	3	4	5	6	7	8	9	10	Final
Jason Vaughan	0	0	2	0	0	0	2	0	0	1	5
Wayne Tallon 🔨	0	1	0	0	2	0	0	1	0	0	4

=== Draw 5 ===
Friday, January 30, 8:00 am

Sheet 1	1	2	3	4	5	6	7	8	9	10	Final
Wayne Tallon	4	0	0	0	1	0	0	X	X	X	5
Grant Odishaw	0	0	4	2	0	0	4	X	X	X	10

Sheet 2	1	2	3	4	5	6	7	8	9	10	Final
Jeremy Mallais	0	1	2	0	0	1	0	0	0	0	4
James Grattan	0	0	0	2	0	0	2	0	2	1	7

Sheet 3	1	2	3	4	5	6	7	8	9	10	11	Final
Terry Odishaw	0	0	0	2	0	1	0	0	0	2	0	5
Jason Vaughan	0	0	1	0	1	0	2	0	1	0	1	6

Sheet 4	1	2	3	4	5	6	7	8	9	10	Final
Andy McCann	1	1	0	0	1	0	0	2	0	2	7
Mike Kennedy	0	0	2	1	0	0	2	0	1	0	6

=== Draw 6 ===
Friday, January 30, 4:00 pm

Sheet 1	1	2	3	4	5	6	7	8	9	10	Final
James Grattan 🔨	0	0	1	0	0	2	0	2	0	0	5
Terry Odishaw	1	1	0	1	0	0	1	0	2	2	8

Sheet 2	1	2	3	4	5	6	7	8	9	10	Final
Mike Kennedy 🔨	2	1	0	2	0	1	1	0	3	X	10
Wayne Tallon	0	0	3	0	3	0	0	1	0	X	7

Sheet 3	1	2	3	4	5	6	7	8	9	10	Final
Grant Odishaw	0	0	1	0	1	0	1	0	1	0	4
Andy McCann 🔨	0	2	0	1	0	1	0	1	0	1	6

Sheet 4	1	2	3	4	5	6	7	8	9	10	Final
Jeremy Mallais 🔨	0	0	1	0	0	1	0	2	0	1	5
Jason Vaughan	0	0	0	0	1	0	1	0	2	0	4

=== Draw 7 ===
Saturday, January 31, 8:00 am

Sheet 1	Final
Andy McCann	/
Wayne Tallon	/

Sheet 2	1	2	3	4	5	6	7	8	9	10	Final
James Grattan	2	0	0	1	0	0	0	1	0	X	4
Jason Vaughan	0	2	1	0	2	0	0	0	1	X	6

Sheet 3	1	2	3	4	5	6	7	8	9	10	11	Final
Jeremy Mallais	2	1	0	3	0	0	0	2	1	0	3	12
Terry Odishaw	0	0	5	0	1	0	2	0	0	1	0	9

Sheet 4	Final
Mike Kennedy	/
Grant Odishaw	/

The McCann vs. Tallon and Kennedy vs. G. Odishaw games were cancelled due to a snowfall warning along with all four teams being out of contention.

== Playoffs ==
Semifinal			Final
			1	Jeremy Mallais	5
2	Jason Vaughan	4	3	James Grattan	4
3	James Grattan	5

=== Semifinal ===
Saturday, January 31, 7:00 pm

Sheet 2	1	2	3	4	5	6	7	8	9	10	11	Final
Jason Vaughan 🔨	1	0	0	0	0	0	0	1	0	2	0	4
James Grattan	0	0	1	1	0	0	1	0	1	0	1	5

=== Final ===
Sunday, February 1, 11:00 am

Sheet 1	1	2	3	4	5	6	7	8	9	10	Final
Jeremy Mallais 🔨	0	0	1	0	1	0	1	0	0	2	5
James Grattan	0	0	0	2	0	0	0	2	0	0	4

2015 Pepsi Tankard

Jeremy Mallais
1st New Brunswick Provincial Championship title
