= 2013 Molson Canadian Men's Provincial Curling Championship =

- Host city: Fredericton Junction, New Brunswick
- Arena: Gladstone Curling Club
- Dates: January 30 – February 3
- Winner: Team Grattan
- Curling club: Gage G&CC, Oromocto
- Skip: James Grattan
- Third: Jason Roach
- Second: Darren Roach
- Lead: Peter Case
- Coach: Daryell Nowlan
- Finalist: Zach Eldridge

The 2013 Molson Canadian Men's Provincial Curling Championship, the provincial men's curling championship for New Brunswick was held from January 30 to February 3 at the Gladstone Curling Club in Fredericton Junction, New Brunswick. The winning James Grattan rink represented New Brunswick at the 2013 Tim Hortons Brier in Edmonton, Alberta.

== Teams ==
The teams are listed as follows:

Skip	Third	Second	Lead	Locale
Paul Dobson	Kevin Boyle	Mark Dobson	Spencer Mawhinney	Thistle St. Andrews CC, Saint John
Terry Odishaw	Andy McCann	Scott Jones	Grant Odishaw	Curl Moncton, Moncton
Marc Lecocq	Mike Kennedy	Jamie Brannen	Dave Konefal	Nackawic CC, Nackawic
Zach Eldridge	Chris Jeffrey	Brian King	Rob Daley	Gage G&CC, Oromocto
James Grattan	Jason Roach	Darren Roach	Peter Case	Gage G&CC, Oromocto
Jason Vaughan	Jeremy Mallais	Paul Nason	Jared Bezanson	Thistle St. Andrews CC, Saint John
Shaun Mott	Dave Nowlan	Derek Ellard	Nick McCann	Gladstone CC, Fredericton Junction
Adam MacDonald	Aaron Young	Tom Muise	Kyle Brown	Woodstock G&CC, Woodstock

== Round Robin standings ==
Final Round Robin standings

Key
Teams to Playoffs

Skip	W	L	W–L	PF	PA	EW	EL	BE	SE
Zach Eldridge	5	2	2–0	34	32	27	22	17	6
James Grattan	5	2	1–1	45	30	27	23	13	5
Jason Vaughan	5	2	0–2	44	36	25	25	15	4
Terry Odishaw	4	3	1–0	51	40	28	25	15	5
Marc Lecocq	4	3	0–1	53	43	30	29	7	7
Paul Dobson	3	4	–	45	44	29	26	11	6
Adam MacDonald	1	6	1–0	21	39	19	24	13	5
Shaun Mott	1	6	0–1	27	46	23	30	13	3

== Round Robin results ==
All draw times listed in Atlantic Time (UTC−04:00).

=== Draw 1 ===
Wednesday, January 30, 12:30 pm

Sheet 1	1	2	3	4	5	6	7	8	9	10	Final
James Grattan	0	0	0	1	0	1	0	0	2	0	4
Zach Eldridge 🔨	0	1	0	0	2	0	0	2	0	1	6

Sheet 2	1	2	3	4	5	6	7	8	9	10	Final
Adam MacDonald 🔨	0	0	2	0	2	0	1	0	X	X	5
Paul Dobson	1	0	0	2	0	3	0	4	X	X	10

Sheet 3	1	2	3	4	5	6	7	8	9	10	Final
Jason Vaughan	0	0	2	0	0	0	1	2	0	2	7
Marc Lecocq 🔨	0	1	0	2	0	1	0	0	2	0	6

Sheet 4	1	2	3	4	5	6	7	8	9	10	11	Final
Shaun Mott 🔨	1	0	0	0	2	0	0	0	2	0	1	6
Terry Odishaw	0	0	0	2	0	0	2	0	0	1	0	5

=== Draw 2 ===
Wednesday, January 30, 8:00 pm

Sheet 1	1	2	3	4	5	6	7	8	9	10	Final
Terry Odishaw 🔨	3	1	0	2	0	4	X	X	X	X	10
Adam MacDonald	0	0	0	0	0	0	X	X	X	X	0

Sheet 2	1	2	3	4	5	6	7	8	9	10	Final
Marc Lecocq	0	0	1	0	0	2	0	2	1	0	6
James Grattan 🔨	2	1	0	0	1	0	1	0	0	2	7

Sheet 3	1	2	3	4	5	6	7	8	9	10	Final
Paul Dobson 🔨	2	0	1	0	2	0	1	0	3	X	9
Shaun Mott	0	1	0	2	0	1	0	1	0	X	5

Sheet 4	1	2	3	4	5	6	7	8	9	10	Final
Zach Eldridge	0	2	1	0	0	0	0	1	1	X	5
Jason Vaughan	2	0	0	0	1	0	0	0	0	X	3

=== Draw 3 ===
Thursday, January 31, 12:30 pm

Sheet 1	1	2	3	4	5	6	7	8	9	10	Final
Shaun Mott 🔨	0	1	0	1	0	1	0	1	0	X	4
Marc Lecocq	1	0	4	0	0	0	2	0	2	X	9

Sheet 2	1	2	3	4	5	6	7	8	9	10	11	Final
Jason Vaughan 🔨	1	0	2	0	1	0	0	2	1	0	1	8
Terry Odishaw	0	1	0	2	0	2	0	0	0	2	0	7

Sheet 3	1	2	3	4	5	6	7	8	9	10	Final
Adam MacDonald	0	1	0	0	0	1	0	1	0	X	3
Zach Eldridge 🔨	1	0	1	1	1	0	0	0	1	X	5

Sheet 4	1	2	3	4	5	6	7	8	9	10	Final
James Grattan 🔨	0	1	0	3	0	0	0	0	0	2	6
Paul Dobson	0	0	1	0	0	0	1	1	1	0	4

=== Draw 4 ===
Thursday, January 31, 8:00 pm

Sheet 1	1	2	3	4	5	6	7	8	9	10	Final
Paul Dobson	0	0	1	0	0	1	0	1	0	X	3
Jason Vaughan 🔨	0	2	0	2	0	0	2	0	3	X	9

Sheet 2	1	2	3	4	5	6	7	8	9	10	Final
Shaun Mott	0	0	0	2	0	0	1	0	1	0	4
Zach Eldridge 🔨	2	0	1	0	0	1	0	1	0	1	6

Sheet 3	1	2	3	4	5	6	7	8	9	10	Final
Terry Odishaw 🔨	2	0	1	0	1	1	0	2	0	1	8
James Grattan	0	1	0	1	0	0	3	0	2	0	7

Sheet 4	1	2	3	4	5	6	7	8	9	10	Final
Adam MacDonald 🔨	0	0	0	1	1	0	0	1	0	X	3
Marc Lecocq	1	0	2	0	0	0	1	0	2	X	6

=== Draw 5 ===
Friday, February 1, 11:30 am

Sheet 1	1	2	3	4	5	6	7	8	9	10	Final
James Grattan 🔨	2	1	1	1	0	2	X	X	X	X	7
Shaun Mott	0	0	0	0	1	0	X	X	X	X	1

Sheet 2	1	2	3	4	5	6	7	8	9	10	Final
Jason Vaughan 🔨	2	1	0	0	3	0	0	3	X	X	9
Adam MacDonald	0	0	0	1	0	1	1	0	X	X	3

Sheet 3	1	2	3	4	5	6	7	8	9	10	Final
Marc Lecocq 🔨	1	0	1	0	0	4	0	1	0	1	8
Paul Dobson	0	1	0	1	1	0	3	0	1	0	7

Sheet 4	1	2	3	4	5	6	7	8	9	10	Final
Zach Eldridge 🔨	1	0	0	0	1	0	0	0	0	2	4
Terry Odishaw	0	0	0	1	0	0	2	0	0	0	3

=== Draw 6 ===
Friday, February 1, 7:00 pm

Sheet 1	1	2	3	4	5	6	7	8	9	10	Final
Zach Eldridge 🔨	0	0	0	0	1	0	0	0	2	0	3
Paul Dobson	0	0	0	2	0	1	1	1	0	1	6

Sheet 2	1	2	3	4	5	6	7	8	9	10	Final
Terry Odishaw 🔨	3	0	0	3	0	2	0	2	0	0	10
Marc Lecocq	0	0	2	0	2	0	2	0	2	1	9

Sheet 3	1	2	3	4	5	6	7	8	9	10	Final
Shaun Mott	0	0	1	0	1	0	0	1	0	0	3
Jason Vaughan 🔨	3	0	0	0	0	1	0	0	0	1	5

Sheet 4	1	2	3	4	5	6	7	8	9	10	Final
James Grattan 🔨	2	0	2	0	0	0	0	1	0	X	5
Adam MacDonald	0	1	0	0	1	0	0	0	0	X	2

=== Draw 7 ===
Saturday, February 2, 11:30 am

Sheet 1	1	2	3	4	5	6	7	8	9	10	Final
Jason Vaughan	0	2	0	0	1	0	0	0	X	X	3
James Grattan	1	0	1	0	0	0	4	3	X	X	9

Sheet 2	1	2	3	4	5	6	7	8	9	10	11	Final
Adam MacDonald	0	0	1	1	1	0	0	0	1	0	1	5
Shaun Mott	1	0	0	0	0	1	1	0	0	1	0	4

Sheet 3	1	2	3	4	5	6	7	8	9	10	Final
Paul Dobson	0	0	1	0	0	2	0	0	3	0	6
Terry Odishaw	0	1	0	4	1	0	1	0	0	1	8

Sheet 4	1	2	3	4	5	6	7	8	9	10	Final
Marc Lecocq	0	0	1	0	2	0	3	3	X	X	9
Zach Eldridge	1	1	0	1	0	2	0	0	X	X	5

== Playoffs ==
Semifinal			Final
			1	Zach Eldridge	6
2	James Grattan	8	2	James Grattan	7
3	Jason Vaughan	3

=== Semifinal ===
Saturday, February 2, 7:00 pm

Sheet 3	1	2	3	4	5	6	7	8	9	10	Final
James Grattan 🔨	3	0	0	0	3	1	0	1	X	X	8
Jason Vaughan	0	1	1	0	0	0	1	0	X	X	3

=== Final ===
Sunday, February 3, 2:00 pm

Sheet 4	1	2	3	4	5	6	7	8	9	10	Final
Zach Eldridge 🔨	1	1	0	1	1	0	1	0	1	0	6
James Grattan	0	0	2	0	0	2	0	1	0	2	7

2013 Molson Canadian Men's Provincial Curling Championship

James Grattan
10th New Brunswick Provincial Championship title

== Qualification events ==
=== Preliminary round ===
The preliminary round for the 2013 Molson Canadian Men's Provincial Curling Championship will take place from January 10 to 13 at Curl Moncton Beauséjour in Moncton. Four teams will qualify to the provincials from the preliminary round.

==== Teams ====
The teams are listed as follows:

Skip	Third	Second	Lead	Locale
Zac Blanchard	Jordon Craft	Blake Hunter	Alex Kyle	Thistle St. Andrews Curling Club, Saint John
Dan Crouse	Tim Forsythe	Andrew Friel	Morris LeBlanc	Curl Moncton, Moncton
Paul Dobson	Kevin Boyle	Mark Dobson	Spencer Mawhinney	Thistle St. Andrews Curling Club, Saint John
Zach Eldridge	Chris Jeffery	Brian King	Rob Daley	Gage Golf & Curling Club, Oromocto
Pierre Fraser	Marcel Robichaud	Shane Longley	Luc Savoie	Curl Moncton, Moncton
James Grattan	Jason Roach	Darren Roach	Peter Case	Gage Golf & Curling Club, Oromocto
Trevor Hanson	Brody Hanson	Chris McCann	Steve Mazerolle	Gage Golf & Curling Club, Oromocto
Damien Lahiton	Justin Smidt	Will Lautenschlager	Mike Hicks	Sackville Curling Club, Sackville
Marc Lecocq	Mike Kennedy	Jamie Brannen	Dave Konefal	Nackawic Curling Club, Nackawic
Shaun Mott	Dave Nowlan	Derek Ellard	Nick McCann	Gladstone Curling Club, Fredericton Junction
Terry Odishaw	Andy McCann	Scott Jones	Grant Odishaw	Curl Moncton, Moncton
Dan Philip	Mitchell Downey	Chris Smith	Nick Munn	Thistle St. Andrews Curling Club, Saint John
Wayne Tallon	Scott Archibald	Andrew Smith	James Adair	Capital Winter Club, Fredericton
Jason Vaughan	Jeremy Mallais	Paul Nason	Jared Bezanson	Thistle St. Andrews Curling Club, Saint John

==== Results ====
===== A Event =====
First Knockout
Zac Blanchard	7
Pierre Fraser	6
Zach Eldridge	9
Damien Lahiton	2
Jason Vaughan	10
Dan Crouse	3
Dan Philip	5
Trevor Hanson	3
Marc Lecocq	9
Shaun Mott	2
Paul Dobson	8
Wayne Tallon	6

Quarterfinals
James Grattan	9
Zac Blanchard	6
Zach Eldridge	8
Jason Vaughan	1
Terry Odishaw	9
Dan Philip	4
Marc Lecocq	4
Paul Dobson	10

Semifinals
James Grattan	2
Zach Eldridge	7
Terry Odishaw	1
Paul Dobson	6

Qualifier 1
Zach Eldridge	5
Paul Dobson	9

===== B Event =====
Second Knockout
Wayne Tallon	8
Dan Philip	9
Dan Crouse	10
Zac Blanchard	5

Semifinals
James Grattan	5
Dan Philip	6
Terry Odishaw	5
Dan Crouse	2

To Qualifier 2
Dan Philip	4
Terry Odishaw	8

Second Knockout
Pierre Fraser	7
Damien Lahiton	6
Trevor Hanson	2
Shaun Mott	8

Quarterfinals
Marc Lecocq	9
Pierre Fraser	5
Jason Vaughan	2
Shaun Mott	6

Semifinals
Marc Lecocq	7
Shaun Mott	5

To Qualifier 2
Zach Eldridge	6
Marc Lecocq	7
Qualifier 2
Terry Odishaw	8
Marc Lecocq	2

===== C Event =====
Third Knockout
Damien Lahiton	6
Trevor Hanson	5

Quarterfinals
Dan Crouse	4
Shaun Mott	8
James Grattan	8
Damien Lahiton	3

Semifinals
Shaun Mott	2
James Grattan	9

Qualifier 3
Marc Lecocq	6
James Grattan	5

Third Knockout
Wayne Tallon	1
Zac Blanchard	7
Pierre Fraser	5
Jason Vaughan	9

Semifinals
Zach Eldridge	9
Zac Blanchard	3
Dan Philip	5
Jason Vaughan	8

Qualifier 4
Zach Eldridge	7
Jason Vaughan	6

=== Wildcard round ===
The wildcard round for the 2013 Molson Canadian Men's Provincial Curling Championship will take place from January 18 to 20 at Gage Golf and Curling Club in Oromocto. Four teams will qualify to the provincials from the wildcard round.

==== Teams ====
The teams are listed as follows:

Skip	Third	Second	Lead	Locale
Zac Blanchard	Jordon Craft	Blake Hunter	Alex Kyle	Thistle St. Andrews Curling Club, Saint John
Dan Crouse	Tim Forsythe	Andrew Friel	Morris LeBlanc	Curl Moncton, Moncton
Pierre Fraser	Marcel Robichaud	Shane Longley	Luc Savoie	Curl Moncton, Moncton
James Grattan	Jason Roach	Darren Roach	Peter Case	Gage Golf & Curling Club, Oromocto
Trevor Hanson	Brody Hanson	Chris McCann	Steve Mazerolle	Gage Golf & Curling Club, Oromocto
Damien Lahiton	Justin Smidt	Will Lautenschlager	Mike Hicks	Sackville Curling Club, Sackville
Adam MacDonald	Aaron Young	Tom Muise	Kyle Brown	Woodstock Golf & Curling Club, Woodstock
Shaun Mott	Dave Nowlan	Derek Ellard	Nick McCann	Gladstone Curling Club, Fredericton Junction
Dan Philip	Mitchell Downey	Chris Smith	Nick Munn	Thistle St. Andrews Curling Club, Saint John
Wayne Tallon	Scott Archibald	Andrew Smith	James Adair	Capital Winter Club, Fredericton
Jason Vaughan	Jeremy Mallais	Paul Nason	Jared Bezanson	Thistle St. Andrews Curling Club, Saint John

==== Results ====
===== A Event =====
First Knockout
Zac Blanchard	2
Shaun Mott	7
Wayne Tallon	9
Dan Crouse	6
Adam MacDonald	2
Pierre Fraser	8

Quarterfinals
Dan Philip	4
Shaun Mott	6
Jason Vaughan	10
Wayne Tallon	0
Damien Lahiton	7
Trevor Hanson	8
James Grattan	8
Pierre Fraser	1

Semifinals
Shaun Mott	9
Jason Vaughan	6
Trevor Hanson	4
James Grattan	8

Qualifier 1
Shaun Mott	2
James Grattan	12

===== B Event =====
Second Knockout
Zac Blanchard	1
Dan Crouse	7
Adam MacDonald	3
Damien Lahiton	10
Dan Philip	8
Wayne Tallon	5

Quarterfinals
Pierre Fraser	9
Dan Crouse	10
Jason Vaughan	7
Damien Lahiton	4
Trevor Hanson	2
Dan Philip	10

Semifinals
Shaun Mott	7
Dan Crouse	4
Jason Vaughan	10
Dan Philip	5

Qualifier 2
Shaun Mott	1
Jason Vaughan	7

===== C Event =====
Third Knockout		Qualifier 3
		Shaun Mott	6
Damien Lahiton	4	Trevor Hanson	3
Trevor Hanson	7

Third Knockout
Zac Blanchard	5
Adam MacDonald	9
Wayne Tallon	5
Pierre Fraser	4

Semifinals
Dan Crouse	6
Adam MacDonald	9
Dan Philip	7
Wayne Tallon	4

Qualifier 4
Adam MacDonald	10
Dan Philip	9
