= Jeremy Mallais =

Canadian curler

- Curler
- Born: July 18, 1988 (age 38); Moncton, New Brunswick

Team
- Curling club: Curl Moncton, Moncton, NB

Curling career
- Member Association: New Brunswick
- Brier: 2 (2015, 2023)
- Top CTRS ranking: 48th (2019–20)

Jeremy Mallais (born July 18, 1988) is a Canadian curler from Moncton, New Brunswick.

== Career ==
Mallais finished second at the 2008 New Brunswick Tankard, losing the final to James Grattan 9–2. He also lost in the final in 2010 playing lead for Terry Odishaw and finished third in 2013 playing third for Jason Vaughan. He won his first Tankard title in 2015 at the 2015 Pepsi Tankard and went on to have a 2–9 record at the 2015 Tim Hortons Brier in Calgary.

He joined Team Scott Jones for the 2019–20 season. They won the Atlantic Superstore Monctonian Challenge and the Steele Cup Cash on the World Curling Tour and played in the 2019 Tour Challenge Tier 2 Grand Slam of Curling event. At provincials, they lost in the semifinal to Jason Roach.

== Personal life ==
Mallais is married to fellow curler Sarah Mallais and they have three children. He works as a CPA for Deloitte.

== Teams ==
Season	Skip	Third	Second	Lead
2008–09	Terry Odishaw	Jeremy Mallais	Grant Odishaw	Chris Jeffrey
2009–10	Terry Odishaw	Jeremy Mallais	Paul Nason	Roger Nason
2010–11	Jeremy Mallais	Jason Roach	Darren Roach	Jared Bezanson
2011–12	Jeremy Mallais	Jason Roach	Darren Roach	Jared Bezanson
2012–13	Jason Vaughan	Jeremy Mallais	Paul Nason	Jared Bezanson
2013–14	Jason Vaughan	Jeremy Mallais	Zac Blanchard	Jared Bezanson
2014–15	Jeremy Mallais	Zach Eldridge	Chris Jeffrey	Jared Bezanson
2015–16	Jeremy Mallais	Chris Jeffrey	Tyler Milligan	Jared Bezanson
2016–17	Jeremy Mallais	Jason Vaughan	Mark Kehoe	Ryan Freeze
2017–18	Jeremy Mallais	Jason Vaughan	Darren Roach	Jared Bezanson
2018–19	Jason Vaughan	Jeremy Mallais	Darren Roach	Jared Bezanson
2019–20	Scott Jones	Jeremy Mallais	Brian King	Robert Daley
2020–21	Jeremy Mallais (Fourth)	Chris Jeffrey	Brian King	Scott Jones (Skip)
2021–22	Jeremy Mallais (Fourth)	Scott Jones (Skip)	Brian King	Chris Medford
2022–23	Jeremy Mallais (Fourth)	Scott Jones (Skip)	Brian King	Jared Bezanson
2024–25	Jeremy Mallais (Fourth)	Scott Jones (Skip)	Brian King	Jared Bezanson
2025–26	Jeremy Mallais (Fourth)	Scott Jones (Skip)	Brian King	Jared Bezanson
