= Brian King (curler) =

Canadian curler (born 1981)

- Curler
- Born: January 2, 1981 (age 45); Ottawa, Ontario

Team
- Curling club: Gage G&CC, Oromocto, NB
- Skip: Scott Jones
- Third: Brian King
- Second: Alex Peasley
- Lead: Sam Forestell

Curling career
- Member Association: New Brunswick
- Brier: 1 (2023)
- Top CTRS ranking: 48th (2019–20)

Brian King (born January 2, 1981, in Ottawa, Ontario) is a Canadian curler from Burton, New Brunswick. He currently plays third on Team Scott Jones.

== Career ==
King competed in his first New Brunswick Tankard in 2010 as second for the Scott Jones. At the 2010 Alexander Keith's Tankard, the team finished with a 4–3 record, missing the playoffs. They returned to the provincial championship the following season where they finished sixth with a 3–4 record.

King joined the Zach Eldridge rink for the 2011–12 season. After failing to qualify in 2012, the team competed in the 2013 Molson Canadian Men's Provincial Curling Championship. There, they topped the round robin standings with a 5–2 record, earning an automatic bye to the championship game where they faced James Grattan. Leading 6–5 in the tenth end, they gave up two points to lose the game 7–6. The team failed to qualify for the provincial championship the following season.

After the 2013–14 season, King left the Eldridge rink and joined the Jason Vaughan team for the 2014–15 season. With Charlie Sullivan at third and Paul Nason at lead, the team qualified for the 2015 Pepsi Tankard where they finished second overall with a 5–2 record. Facing Team Grattan in the semifinal, Team Vaughan lost 5–4 in an extra end, ending their run. King only stayed with the team for one season as he joined the Jason Roach rink at lead for the 2015–16 season. For two years in a row, the team just missed out on the playoffs at the provincial championship, going 4–3 in both 2016 and 2017.

After playing for four different rinks, King returned to Team Scott Jones for the 2017–18 season. On tour, the team found success at the Dave Jones Mayflower Cashspiel and the Jim Sullivan Curling Classic, reaching the quarterfinals in both events. Despite their tour success, the team placed sixth at the 2018 Papa John's Pizza Tankard with a 3–4 record. The following season, Team Jones lost in the quarterfinals of both the Steele Cup Cash and the Jim Sullivan Curling Classic. They also reached the semifinals of the Stu Sells 1824 Halifax Classic where they lost to the Brad Gushue rink. At the 2019 NB Tankard, the team went 4–3 in the round robin and defeated Ed Cyr 7–6 in a tiebreaker. They then lost 7–4 to the Grattan rink in the semifinal.

The 2019–20 season was the best season yet for the Jones rink, beginning with back-to-back tour victories at the Steele Cup Cash and the Atlantic Superstore Monctonian Challenge. They competed in the 2019 Tour Challenge Tier 2 Grand Slam of Curling event, where after a 2–2 record, they lost to Rich Ruohonen in a tiebreaker. The team also reached the final of the Jim Sullivan Classic, losing to the Grattan rink. The team again finished third at the 2020 New Brunswick Tankard after losing 8–5 in the semifinal to Jason Roach.

Due to the COVID-19 pandemic in New Brunswick, the 2021 provincial championship was cancelled. As the reigning provincial champions, Team Grattan was invited to represent New Brunswick at the 2021 Tim Hortons Brier, which they accepted. Team Jones only played in one event during the 2020–21 season, the Stu Sells 1824 Halifax Classic, where they finished 1–3.

Team Jones began the 2021–22 season at the Superstore Monctonian Challenge, where after a 4–0 round robin record, they lost in the quarterfinals to the Matthew Manuel rink. The 2022 New Brunswick Tankard was held in a triple knockout format for the first time. Team Jones went 4–3 through the event, losing the C qualifier match to the Grattan rink. The next season, the team played in the PointsBet Capital Winter Club Repechage where they lost in the final to Karsten Sturmay. They did not reach the playoffs in any of their other events. Team Jones finished second through the round robin of the 2023 New Brunswick Tankard with a 5–2 record. They then beat Team Grattan 7–6 in the semifinal to face Team Roach in the championship game. After getting out to a 7–1 lead after five ends, the team stayed ahead to secure the provincial title by a final score of 8–7. It was King's first provincial title. This qualified the team to represent New Brunswick at the 2023 Tim Hortons Brier. There, they finished with a 1–7 record, only beating the Yukon's Thomas Scoffin.

== Personal life ==
King is employed as a pharmacist at Riverside Guardian. He has two children.

== Teams ==
Season	Skip	Third	Second	Lead
2009–10	Andy McCann (Fourth)	Scott Jones (Skip)	Brian King	Pierre Fraser
2010–11	Scott Jones	Andy McCann	Brian King	Ronnie Burgess
2011–12	Zach Eldridge	Chris Jeffrey	Brian King	Robert Daley
2012–13	Zach Eldridge	Chris Jeffrey	Brian King	Robert Daley
2013–14	Zach Eldridge	Chris Jeffrey	Brian King	Robert Daley
2014–15	Jason Vaughan	Charlie Sullivan	Brian King	Paul Nason
2015–16	Jason Roach	Andy McCann	Darren Roach	Brian King
2016–17	Jason Roach	Andy McCann	Darren Roach	Brian King
2017–18	Scott Jones	Jamie Brannen	Brian King	Robert Daley
2018–19	Scott Jones	Jamie Brannen	Brian King	Robert Daley
2019–20	Scott Jones	Jeremy Mallais	Brian King	Robert Daley
2020–21	Jeremy Mallais (Fourth)	Chris Jeffrey	Brian King	Scott Jones (Skip)
2021–22	Jeremy Mallais (Fourth)	Scott Jones (Skip)	Brian King	Chris Medford
2022–23	Jeremy Mallais (Fourth)	Scott Jones (Skip)	Brian King	Jared Bezanson
2023–24	Scott Jones	Brian King	Scott Weagle	Jared Bezanson
2024–25	Jeremy Mallais (Fourth)	Scott Jones (Skip)	Brian King	Jared Bezanson
2025–26	Jeremy Mallais (Fourth)	Scott Jones (Skip)	Brian King	Jared Bezanson
2026–27	Scott Jones	Brian King	Alex Peasley	Sam Forestell
