= Andy McCann =

Canadian curler

- Curler
- Born: April 26, 1982 (age 44); Oromocto, New Brunswick

Team
- Curling club: Gladstone Curling Club, Fredericton Junction
- Skip: James Grattan
- Third: Jonathan Beuk
- Second: Andy McCann
- Lead: Noah Riggs
- Alternate: Drew Grattan

Curling career
- Member Association: New Brunswick
- Brier: 10 (2008, 2012, 2014, 2018 2020, 2021, 2022, 2024, 2025, 2026)
- Top CTRS ranking: 22nd (2025–26)

Andrew McCann (born April 26, 1982 in Oromocto) is a Canadian curler from Fredericton Junction, New Brunswick. He currently plays second on Team James Grattan.

== Career ==
McCann was the alternate for Team New Brunswick skipped by James Grattan at the 2008 Tim Hortons Brier where they finished with a 2–9 record. He played in two games. He won his first provincial championship in 2012 at the 2012 Molson Canadian Men's Provincial Curling Championship as third for Terry Odishaw. At the 2012 Tim Hortons Brier, the team had a good showing, finishing the round robin in sixth with a 5–6 record. McCann would once again spare for Grattan at the 2014 Tim Hortons Brier. He played no games but the team finished with a respectable 6–5 record.

McCann joined the Grattan rink for the 2017–18 season. It was a good move for him as the team won the 2018 Papa John's Pizza Tankard, McCann's second provincial title. At the 2018 Tim Hortons Brier, they finished 2–5 in the new pool format, failing to qualify for the playoffs. They did manage to win their seeding game however, officially ending with a 3–5 record.

After a slow 2018–19 season, Team Grattan had a quick start to the 2019–20 season by winning the 2019 Jim Sullivan Curling Classic. McCann would win his third provincial title this season as well at the 2020 New Brunswick Tankard where Team Grattan stole two in the tenth end to defeat Jason Roach 8–6. They started out 1–2 at the 2020 Tim Hortons Brier but were able to upset higher seeds Ontario's John Epping and British Columbia's Steve Laycock to sit in a good spot going into their final two games. Unfortunately, they would lose both of those games, finishing the round robin at 3–4, missing the playoffs.

== Personal life ==
McCann is married and has three children. He is the regional vice-president of sales at Salesforce.

== Teams ==
Season	Skip	Third	Second	Lead
2004–05	Kevin Boyle	Mark Dobson	Spencer Mawhinney	Andy McCann
2006–07	Mike Kennedy	Marc LeCocq	Shaun Mott	Andy McCann
2007–08	Jim Sullivan	Marc LeCocq	Shaun Mott	Andy McCann
2008–09	Jim Sullivan	Marc LeCocq	Jason Roach	Andy McCann
2009–10	Andy McCann (Fourth)	Scott Jones	Brian King	Pierre Fraser
2010–11	Scott Jones	Andy McCann	Brian King	Ronnie Burgess
2011–12	Terry Odishaw	Andy McCann	Scott Jones	Grant Odishaw
2012–13	Terry Odishaw	Andy McCann	Scott Jones	Grant Odishaw
2013–14	Marc LeCocq	Andy McCann	Scott Jones	Jamie Brannen
2014–15	Andy McCann	Marc LeCocq	Scott Jones	Jamie Brannen
2015–16	Jason Roach	Andy McCann	Darren Roach	Brian King
2016–17	Jason Roach	Andy McCann	Darren Roach	Brian King
2017–18	James Grattan	Andy McCann	Chris Jeffrey	Peter Case
2018–19	James Grattan	Chris Jeffrey	Andy McCann	Peter Case
2019–20	James Grattan	Paul Dobson	Andy McCann	Jamie Brannen
2020–21	James Grattan	Paul Dobson	Andy McCann	Jamie Brannen
2021–22	James Grattan	Darren Moulding	Paul Dobson	Andy McCann / Jamie Brannen
2022–23	James Grattan	Scott McDonald	Paul Dobson	Andy McCann
2023–24	James Grattan	Joel Krats	Paul Dobson	Andy McCann
2024–25	James Grattan	Joel Krats	Paul Dobson	Andy McCann
2025–26	James Grattan	Joel Krats	Andy McCann	Noah Riggs
2026–27	James Grattan	Jonathan Beuk	Andy McCann	Noah Riggs
