= Chris Jeffrey =

Canadian curler

- Curler
- Born: November 19, 1988 (age 37); Moncton, New Brunswick

Team
- Curling club: Capital Winter Club, Fredericton, NB
- Skip: Travis Colter
- Fourth: Jack Smeltzer
- Second: Chris Jeffrey
- Lead: Michael Donovan

Curling career
- Member Association: New Brunswick
- Brier: 4 (2015, 2018, 2020, 2023)
- Top CTRS ranking: 39th (2019–20)

Christopher Jeffrey (born November 19, 1988) is a Canadian curler from Halifax, Nova Scotia. He currently plays second on Team Travis Colter.

== Career ==
=== Men's ===
In his junior career, Jeffrey played in the 2007 Canadian Junior Curling Championships, finishing with a 4–8 record.

Jeffrey made the provincial final in 2013 playing third for Zach Eldridge. They lost to James Grattan by one point. He won his first Tankard title in 2015 at the 2015 Pepsi Tankard as second for Jeremy Mallais and they went on to have a 2–9 record at the 2015 Tim Hortons Brier in Calgary. He joined the Grattan rink for the 2017–18 season and the move paid off for him as the team won the 2018 Papa John's Pizza Tankard. At the 2018 Tim Hortons Brier, they finished with a 3–5 record. They won the tankard once again in 2020 and finished with a 3–4 record at the 2020 Tim Hortons Brier.

=== Mixed doubles ===
Jeffrey teamed up with Jaclyn Tingley for the 2019 New Brunswick Mixed Doubles Championship. They made the semifinals where they lost to eventual winners Leah Thompson and Charlie Sullivan. They also competed at the 2020 championship but failed to qualify for the playoffs.

For the 2021 provincial championship, Jeffrey teamed up with Katie Forward. The team lost out in the qualification round.

== Personal life ==
Jeffrey is married and works as a senior engineer at Teck Resources Limited.

== Teams ==
Season	Skip	Third	Second	Lead	Alternate
2008–09	Terry Odishaw	Jeremy Mallais	Grant Odishaw	Chris Jeffrey	
2010–11	Mike Kennedy	Chris Jeffrey	Scot Fox	Dave Konefal	
2011–12	Zach Eldridge	Chris Jeffrey	Brian King	Robert Daley	
2012–13	Zach Eldridge	Chris Jeffrey	Brian King	Robert Daley	
2013–14	Zach Eldridge	Chris Jeffrey	Brian King	Robert Daley	
2014–15	Jeremy Mallais	Zach Eldridge	Chris Jeffrey	Jared Benzanson	
2015–16	Jeremy Mallais	Chris Jeffrey	Tyler Milligan	Jared Benzanson	
2016–17	Terry Odishaw	Grant Odishaw	Chris Jeffrey	Mark Ward	
2017–18	James Grattan	Andy McCann	Chris Jeffrey	Peter Case	
2018–19	James Grattan	Chris Jeffrey	Andy McCann	Peter Case	
2019–20	James Grattan	Paul Dobson	Andy McCann	Jamie Brannen	Chris Jeffrey
2020–21	Jeremy Mallais (Fourth)	Chris Jeffrey	Brian King	Scott Jones (Skip)	
2021–22	Zach Eldridge	Chris Jeffrey	Ronnie Burgess	Brody Hanson	
2022–23	Zach Eldridge	Chris Jeffrey	Ronnie Burgess	Brody Hanson	
2023–24	Zach Eldridge	Jack Smeltzer	Chris Jeffrey	Michael Donovan	
2026–27	Jack Smeltzer (Fourth)	Travis Colter (Skip)	Chris Jeffrey	Michael Donovan	
