= Zach Eldridge =

Canadian curler (born 1984)

- Curler
- Born: May 31, 1984 (age 42); Nackawic, New Brunswick

Team
- Curling club: Capital Winter Club, Fredericton, NB
- Skip: Zach Eldridge
- Third: Jack Smeltzer
- Second: Chris Jeffrey
- Lead: Michael Donovan

Curling career
- Member Association: New Brunswick
- Brier: 2 (2013, 2015)
- Top CTRS ranking: 88th (2023–24)

Zach Eldridge (born May 31, 1984) is a Canadian curler from Nackawic-Millville, New Brunswick.

== Career ==
Eldridge lost the final of the 2013 Molson Canadian Men's Provincial Curling Championship to James Grattan by a narrow score of 7–6. He did get to go to the 2013 Tim Hortons Brier with the team though as their alternate. There, New Brunswick they went 5–6. Eldridge didn't play in any games.

He joined the Jeremy Mallais rink for the 2014–15 season and it paid off as the team won the 2015 Pepsi Tankard. At the 2015 Tim Hortons Brier in Calgary, they finished 2–9.

== Personal life ==
Eldridge works as a realtor at Keller Williams Capital Realty, in Fredericton.

== Teams ==
| Season | Skip | Third | Second | Lead |
|---|---|---|---|---|
| 2009–10 | Jamie Brannen | Zach Eldridge | Ronnie Burgess | Nicholas Munn |
| 2011–12 | Zach Eldridge | Chris Jeffrey | Brian King | Robert Daley |
| 2012–13 | Zach Eldridge | Chris Jeffrey | Brian King | Robert Daley |
| 2013–14 | Zach Eldridge | Chris Jeffrey | Brian King | Robert Daley |
| 2014–15 | Jeremy Mallais | Zach Eldridge | Chris Jeffrey | Jared Bezanson |
| 2015–16 | Jeremy Mallais | Zach Eldridge | Chris Jeffrey | Jared Bezanson |
| 2018–19 | Ryan Cain | Zach Eldridge | Jesse Arseneau | Mike Flannery |
| 2019–20 | Dave Sullivan | Zach Eldridge | Jared McGinn | Bill Gaines |
| 2021–22 | Zach Eldridge | Chris Jeffrey | Ronnie Burgess | Brody Hanson |
| 2022–23 | Zach Eldridge | Chris Jeffrey | Ronnie Burgess | Brody Hanson |
| 2023–24 | Zach Eldridge | Jack Smeltzer | Chris Jeffrey | Michael Donovan |
