= 2013 Tim Hortons Brier =

National championship

- Host city: Edmonton, Alberta
- Arena: Rexall Place
- Dates: March 2–10
- Attendance: 190,113
- Winner: Northern Ontario
- Curling club: Soo CA, Sault Ste. Marie
- Skip: Brad Jacobs
- Third: Ryan Fry
- Second: E. J. Harnden
- Lead: Ryan Harnden
- Alternate: Matt Dumontelle
- Coach: Tom Coulterman
- Finalist: Manitoba (Jeff Stoughton)

The 2013 Tim Hortons Brier, the Canadian men's national curling championship, was held from March 2 to 10 at Rexall Place in Edmonton, Alberta. This edition of the Brier marked the thirteenth time that Alberta has hosted the Brier, and the sixth time that Edmonton has hosted the Brier.

In the final, Brad Jacobs of Northern Ontario defeated three-time Brier champion Jeff Stoughton of Manitoba with a score of 11–4 to win his first Brier title and Northern Ontario's first title since 1985. Jacobs and his team represented Canada at the 2013 Ford World Men's Curling Championship in Victoria, British Columbia.

== Event summary ==
The eighty-fourth edition of the Canadian Men's Curling Championship saw one of the strongest fields in the past few years assembled. Defending champion Glenn Howard of Ontario made his eighth consecutive and record fifteenth overall appearance at the Brier. Veterans Kevin Martin of Alberta, an Olympic gold medallist and former world champion, and Jeff Stoughton of Manitoba, a former world champion, made their twelfth and tenth appearances at the Brier, respectively.

Former bronze medallist and Olympic gold medallist Brad Gushue made his tenth appearance at the Brier representing Newfoundland and Labrador, while former Brier champion Jean-Michel Ménard returned to compete for a fifth time. Northern Ontario's Brad Jacobs, a former bronze medallist and perennial competitor, and Jamie Koe of the Northwest Territories and Yukon, who made a breakout playoffs finish last year, returned to the Brier once more. Brock Virtue of Saskatchewan and Andrew Bilesky of British Columbia made their first appearances at the Brier, while veterans James Grattan of New Brunswick, Eddie MacKenzie of Prince Edward Island, and Paul Flemming of Nova Scotia made repeat appearances at the Brier.

Manitoba, Newfoundland and Labrador, Northern Ontario, Ontario, and Quebec shot out to the top of the pack early on, while Alberta struggled to find its rhythm in the beginning draws, dropping four games out of the first five. As the tournament progressed, the top teams began to battle for rankings, and after the halfway point, only Ontario remained undefeated. Alberta began to string up a winning streak, and scored crucial victories as they moved up in the standings. At the end of the round-robin, Ontario had clinched the first seed in the standings, with only one loss to Alberta in the round robin. Newfoundland and Labrador and Northern Ontario secured spots in page 3 vs. 4 games with two wins on the last day, while Manitoba's win in the last draw propelled them to the page 1 vs. 2 games against Ontario, simultaneously dropping Alberta out of playoff contention.

In the page playoffs, Ontario's Glenn Howard and Manitoba's Jeff Stoughton faced off in a battle of veterans, which began as a close game and ended with a win for Manitoba after a missed shot by Howard gave Stoughton a shot for three and the win, making the final score 7–6. Brad Jacobs of Northern Ontario and Brad Gushue of Newfoundland and Labrador played to claim a spot in the semifinals. Jacobs held a slight advantage throughout the game, but Gushue made a comeback in the tenth to force an extra end, in which Jacobs drew for the 6–5 win.

Jacobs then played Howard in the semifinal for a spot in the final, and early on, both teams played a back-and-forth game. However, a steal of two for Northern Ontario in the fifth, along with more missed shots from Howard and strong play from Jacobs, led to an upset win by Jacobs with a score of 9–7. Howard and Gushue then played for the bronze in another tight game which ended in Howard making a draw for the win in an extra end, resulting in a score of 7–6. Jacobs and Stoughton then played for the championship, in what turned out to be a mostly one-sided affair after excellent shots by Jacobs led to steals and multi-point ends against a struggling Manitoba team. Jacobs and their team scored four straight points in the second half of the game, sealing it up in nine ends with a score of 11–4.

== Teams ==
Alberta	British Columbia	Manitoba	New Brunswick
Saville SC, Edmonton Skip: Kevin Martin; Third: John Morris; Second: Marc Kennedy; Lead: Ben Hebert; Alternate: Karrick Martin	Royal City CC, New Westminster Skip: Andrew Bilesky; Third: Steve Kopf; Second: Derek Errington; Lead: Aaron Watson; Alternate: Sean Geall	Charleswood CC, Winnipeg Skip: Jeff Stoughton; Third: Jon Mead; Second: Reid Carruthers; Lead: Mark Nichols; Alternate: Garth Smith	Gage G&CC, Oromocto Skip: James Grattan; Third: Jason Roach; Second: Darren Roach; Lead: Peter Case; Alternate: Zach Eldridge
Newfoundland and Labrador	Northern Ontario	Nova Scotia	Ontario
Bally Haly G&CC, St. John's Skip: Brad Gushue; Third: Brett Gallant; Second: Adam Casey; Lead: Geoff Walker; Alternate: Jamie Korab	Soo CA, Sault Ste. Marie Skip: Brad Jacobs; Third: Ryan Fry; Second: E. J. Harnden; Lead: Ryan Harnden; Alternate: Matt Dumontelle	Lakeshore CC, Lower Sackville Fourth: Ian Fitzner-Leblanc; Skip: Paul Flemming; Second: Graham Breckon; Lead: Kelly Mittelstadt; Alternate: Kent Smith	Coldwater & District CC, Coldwater Skip: Glenn Howard; Third: Wayne Middaugh; Second: Brent Laing; Lead: Craig Savill; Alternate: Scott Howard
Prince Edward Island	Quebec	Saskatchewan	Yukon/Northwest Territories
Charlottetown CC, Charlottetown Skip: Eddie MacKenzie; Third: Anson Carmody; Second: Alex MacFadyen; Lead: Sean Ledgerwood; Alternate: Phil Gorveatt	CC Etchemin, Saint-Romuald Skip: Jean-Michel Ménard; Third: Martin Crête; Second: Éric Sylvain; Lead: Philippe Ménard; Alternate: Pierre Charette	Callie CC, Regina Skip: Brock Virtue; Third: Braeden Moskowy; Second: Chris Schille; Lead: D. J. Kidby; Alternate: Brock Montgomery	Yellowknife CC, Yellowknife Skip: Jamie Koe; Third: Tom Naugler; Second: Brad Chorostkowski; Lead: Robert Borden; Alternate: Kevin Whitehead

=== Team rankings ===
Team	CTRS ranking (As of Feb 10)	WCT Order of Merit (As of Week 29)
Manitoba (Stoughton)	2	5
Ontario (Howard)	4	1
Alberta (Martin)	5	4
Northern Ontario (Jacobs)	6	8
Newfoundland and Labrador (Gushue)	9	9
Quebec (Ménard)	15	16
British Columbia (Bilesky)	29	59
Saskatchewan (Virtue)	46	51
New Brunswick (Grattan)	56	125
Nova Scotia (Flemming)	64	99
Prince Edward Island (MacKenzie)	82	58
Northwest Territories/Yukon (Koe)	NR	75

== Map of teams ==
Provincial Winners

== Round-robin standings ==
Final round-robin standings

Key
Teams to Playoffs

Locale	Skip	W	L	PF	PA	EW	EL	BE	SE	S%
Ontario	Glenn Howard	10	1	76	39	48	32	17	17	90%
Manitoba	Jeff Stoughton	8	3	72	61	47	45	11	10	89%
Newfoundland and Labrador	Brad Gushue	8	3	74	52	46	39	15	8	87%
Northern Ontario	Brad Jacobs	8	3	81	52	46	38	13	11	86%
Alberta	Kevin Martin	7	4	66	53	44	39	13	13	88%
Quebec	Jean-Michel Ménard	6	5	65	54	42	40	22	8	86%
New Brunswick	James Grattan	5	6	68	69	51	40	14	15	85%
Northwest Territories/Yukon	Jamie Koe	5	6	70	74	42	48	9	11	82%
Saskatchewan	Brock Virtue	5	6	62	63	45	44	16	12	85%
Prince Edward Island	Eddie MacKenzie	2	9	44	74	31	44	21	1	80%
Nova Scotia	Paul Flemming	1	10	43	86	30	48	18	2	82%
British Columbia	Andrew Bilesky	1	10	47	86	36	50	13	4	85%

== Round-robin results ==
All times listed in Mountain Standard Time (UTC−7).

=== Draw 1 ===
Saturday, March 2, 1:30 pm

Sheet A	1	2	3	4	5	6	7	8	9	10	Final
Northern Ontario (Jacobs)	0	2	1	0	1	0	3	0	4	X	11
Northwest Territories/Yukon (Koe) 🔨	1	0	0	2	0	1	0	2	0	X	6

Sheet B	1	2	3	4	5	6	7	8	9	10	Final
New Brunswick (Grattan)	0	0	0	0	1	0	0	1	2	0	4
Quebec (Ménard) 🔨	0	0	0	3	0	0	1	0	0	1	5

Sheet C	1	2	3	4	5	6	7	8	9	10	Final
Nova Scotia (Flemming) 🔨	1	0	0	1	0	0	0	X	X	X	2
Newfoundland and Labrador (Gushue)	0	0	2	0	0	5	3	X	X	X	10

Sheet D	1	2	3	4	5	6	7	8	9	10	11	Final
Saskatchewan (Virtue) 🔨	0	0	1	0	0	0	0	1	1	0	1	4
Prince Edward Island (MacKenzie)	0	0	0	0	0	0	1	0	0	2	0	3

=== Draw 2 ===
Saturday, March 2, 6:30 pm

Sheet A	1	2	3	4	5	6	7	8	9	10	Final
Newfoundland and Labrador (Gushue)	2	0	0	3	0	2	1	0	X	X	8
Prince Edward Island (MacKenzie) 🔨	0	1	0	0	1	0	0	1	X	X	3

Sheet B	1	2	3	4	5	6	7	8	9	10	11	Final
Alberta (Martin)	0	0	1	0	1	0	1	0	1	0	0	4
Manitoba (Stoughton) 🔨	0	1	0	1	0	1	0	0	0	1	1	5

Sheet C	1	2	3	4	5	6	7	8	9	10	Final
Northwest Territories/Yukon (Koe)	0	2	2	0	1	0	0	5	0	X	10
New Brunswick (Grattan) 🔨	1	0	0	1	0	1	3	0	1	X	7

Sheet D	1	2	3	4	5	6	7	8	9	10	Final
Ontario (Howard)	0	0	3	1	1	0	0	2	1	X	8
British Columbia (Bilesky) 🔨	2	1	0	0	0	1	0	0	0	X	4

=== Draw 3 ===
Sunday, March 3, 8:30 am

Sheet A	1	2	3	4	5	6	7	8	9	10	Final
Quebec (Ménard) 🔨	0	2	0	0	2	0	1	0	3	X	8
Alberta (Martin)	0	0	0	2	0	1	0	1	0	X	4

Sheet B	1	2	3	4	5	6	7	8	9	10	Final
British Columbia (Bilesky) 🔨	1	0	0	1	0	0	1	X	X	X	3
Northern Ontario (Jacobs)	0	1	3	0	2	3	0	X	X	X	9

Sheet C	1	2	3	4	5	6	7	8	9	10	Final
Saskatchewan (Virtue)	0	1	0	1	0	0	1	0	2	0	5
Ontario (Howard) 🔨	2	0	0	0	1	1	0	2	0	1	7

Sheet D	1	2	3	4	5	6	7	8	9	10	Final
Nova Scotia (Flemming)	0	0	1	0	0	1	2	0	X	X	4
Manitoba (Stoughton) 🔨	3	0	0	0	2	0	0	4	X	X	9

=== Draw 4 ===
Sunday, March 3, 1:30 pm

Sheet A	1	2	3	4	5	6	7	8	9	10	Final
New Brunswick (Grattan) 🔨	2	0	2	1	1	0	2	0	0	X	8
Nova Scotia (Flemming)	0	2	0	0	0	1	0	1	0	X	4

Sheet B	1	2	3	4	5	6	7	8	9	10	Final
Newfoundland and Labrador (Gushue)	1	0	2	1	2	0	1	X	X	X	7
Saskatchewan (Virtue) 🔨	0	1	0	0	0	1	0	X	X	X	2

Sheet C	1	2	3	4	5	6	7	8	9	10	Final
Northern Ontario (Jacobs) 🔨	1	0	2	0	3	1	0	3	X	X	10
Prince Edward Island (MacKenzie)	0	1	0	1	0	0	2	0	X	X	4

Sheet D	1	2	3	4	5	6	7	8	9	10	Final
Quebec (Ménard)	0	1	0	3	0	0	1	0	1	X	6
Northwest Territories/Yukon (Koe) 🔨	0	0	1	0	1	0	0	1	0	X	3

=== Draw 5 ===
Sunday, March 3, 6:30 pm

Sheet A	1	2	3	4	5	6	7	8	9	10	Final
Ontario (Howard) 🔨	1	0	1	1	0	2	0	2	0	1	8
Manitoba (Stoughton)	0	1	0	0	1	0	1	0	2	0	5

Sheet B	1	2	3	4	5	6	7	8	9	10	Final
Prince Edward Island (MacKenzie)	0	0	0	0	0	2	0	1	X	X	3
Northwest Territories/Yukon (Koe) 🔨	0	2	1	0	2	0	3	0	X	X	8

Sheet C	1	2	3	4	5	6	7	8	9	10	Final
British Columbia (Bilesky) 🔨	2	0	0	0	0	1	0	X	X	X	3
Alberta (Martin)	0	2	1	3	1	0	3	X	X	X	10

Sheet D	1	2	3	4	5	6	7	8	9	10	11	Final
Newfoundland and Labrador (Gushue) 🔨	1	0	1	0	0	1	0	2	0	1	1	7
New Brunswick (Grattan)	0	1	0	2	1	0	1	0	1	0	0	6

=== Draw 6 ===
Monday, March 4, 1:30 pm

Sheet A	1	2	3	4	5	6	7	8	9	10	Final
British Columbia (Bilesky)	0	0	0	1	0	0	0	0	0	X	1
Saskatchewan (Virtue) 🔨	0	2	1	0	0	0	1	0	0	X	4

Sheet B	1	2	3	4	5	6	7	8	9	10	Final
Nova Scotia (Flemming)	0	0	0	0	0	2	0	X	X	X	2
Ontario (Howard) 🔨	2	0	3	2	1	0	2	X	X	X	10

Sheet C	1	2	3	4	5	6	7	8	9	10	Final
Quebec (Ménard) 🔨	2	0	0	0	0	1	1	0	1	1	6
Manitoba (Stoughton)	0	1	1	2	2	0	0	1	0	0	7

Sheet D	1	2	3	4	5	6	7	8	9	10	Final
Alberta (Martin)	0	0	1	0	0	0	0	X	X	X	1
Northern Ontario (Jacobs) 🔨	3	1	0	0	3	0	1	X	X	X	8

=== Draw 7 ===
Monday, March 4, 6:30 pm

Sheet A	1	2	3	4	5	6	7	8	9	10	Final
Prince Edward Island (MacKenzie)	0	2	0	0	2	0	0	0	1	X	5
Quebec (Ménard) 🔨	3	0	1	1	0	0	3	0	0	X	8

Sheet B	1	2	3	4	5	6	7	8	9	10	11	Final
Saskatchewan (Virtue)	0	0	0	2	1	0	0	2	0	3	0	8
New Brunswick (Grattan) 🔨	2	1	2	0	0	1	1	0	1	0	1	9

Sheet C	1	2	3	4	5	6	7	8	9	10	11	Final
Newfoundland and Labrador (Gushue) 🔨	3	0	1	0	1	0	1	0	2	0	1	9
Northern Ontario (Jacobs)	0	1	0	1	0	2	0	2	0	2	0	8

Sheet D	1	2	3	4	5	6	7	8	9	10	Final
Northwest Territories/Yukon (Koe)	1	1	0	2	0	2	3	0	0	X	9
Nova Scotia (Flemming) 🔨	0	0	1	0	2	0	0	2	1	X	6

=== Draw 8 ===
Tuesday, March 5, 1:30 pm

Sheet A	1	2	3	4	5	6	7	8	9	10	Final
Alberta (Martin) 🔨	0	0	2	0	0	1	0	0	2	0	5
New Brunswick (Grattan)	1	1	0	1	0	0	0	2	0	1	6

Sheet B	1	2	3	4	5	6	7	8	9	10	Final
Manitoba (Stoughton) 🔨	1	0	3	2	1	0	2	X	X	X	9
Prince Edward Island (MacKenzie)	0	1	0	0	0	1	0	X	X	X	2

Sheet C	1	2	3	4	5	6	7	8	9	10	Final
Ontario (Howard)	0	0	0	1	2	2	0	2	0	X	7
Northwest Territories/Yukon (Koe) 🔨	1	0	1	0	0	0	1	0	1	X	4

Sheet D	1	2	3	4	5	6	7	8	9	10	Final
British Columbia (Bilesky) 🔨	1	0	1	0	0	0	1	0	0	X	3
Newfoundland and Labrador (Gushue)	0	2	0	0	0	2	0	1	1	X	6

=== Draw 9 ===
Tuesday, March 5, 6:30 pm

Sheet A	1	2	3	4	5	6	7	8	9	10	Final
Northern Ontario (Jacobs)	0	1	0	0	0	0	1	X	X	X	2
Ontario (Howard) 🔨	3	0	1	1	2	1	0	X	X	X	8

Sheet B	1	2	3	4	5	6	7	8	9	10	Final
Quebec (Ménard)	2	0	1	0	2	1	0	3	X	X	9
British Columbia (Bilesky) 🔨	0	1	0	1	0	0	1	0	X	X	3

Sheet C	1	2	3	4	5	6	7	8	9	10	Final
Alberta (Martin) 🔨	1	2	0	3	2	1	0	X	X	X	9
Nova Scotia (Flemming)	0	0	2	0	0	0	1	X	X	X	3

Sheet D	1	2	3	4	5	6	7	8	9	10	Final
Manitoba (Stoughton) 🔨	2	0	1	0	1	0	0	2	0	1	7
Saskatchewan (Virtue)	0	2	0	1	0	1	0	0	2	0	6

=== Draw 10 ===
Wednesday, March 6, 1:30 pm

Sheet A	1	2	3	4	5	6	7	8	9	10	Final
Saskatchewan (Virtue) 🔨	0	3	1	0	2	0	0	1	X	X	7
Nova Scotia (Flemming)	0	0	0	1	0	0	1	0	X	X	2

Sheet B	1	2	3	4	5	6	7	8	9	10	Final
Northwest Territories/Yukon (Koe)	0	1	0	0	1	0	1	0	0	X	3
Newfoundland and Labrador (Gushue) 🔨	2	0	0	1	0	2	0	0	2	X	7

Sheet C	1	2	3	4	5	6	7	8	9	10	Final
New Brunswick (Grattan)	0	0	2	0	0	1	0	2	0	3	8
Prince Edward Island (MacKenzie) 🔨	0	0	0	2	0	0	2	0	2	0	6

Sheet D	1	2	3	4	5	6	7	8	9	10	Final
Northern Ontario (Jacobs) 🔨	0	1	0	0	0	0	3	1	0	1	6
Quebec (Ménard)	0	0	1	0	2	0	0	0	1	0	4

=== Draw 11 ===
Wednesday, March 6, 8:00 pm

Sheet A	1	2	3	4	5	6	7	8	9	10	Final
Northwest Territories/Yukon (Koe)	1	1	0	0	1	0	0	0	X	X	3
Alberta (Martin) 🔨	0	0	4	1	0	1	1	1	X	X	8

Sheet B	1	2	3	4	5	6	7	8	9	10	Final
Ontario (Howard)	0	0	3	0	3	0	1	X	X	X	7
New Brunswick (Grattan) 🔨	0	1	0	1	0	1	0	X	X	X	3

Sheet C	1	2	3	4	5	6	7	8	9	10	Final
Manitoba (Stoughton) 🔨	2	0	2	0	0	1	0	4	X	X	9
Newfoundland and Labrador (Gushue)	0	1	0	0	2	0	2	0	X	X	5

Sheet D	1	2	3	4	5	6	7	8	9	10	Final
Prince Edward Island (MacKenzie) 🔨	0	3	0	2	0	2	0	2	0	1	10
British Columbia (Bilesky)	0	0	1	0	1	0	3	0	2	0	7

=== Draw 12 ===
Thursday, March 7, 8:30 am

Sheet B	1	2	3	4	5	6	7	8	9	10	11	Final
Northern Ontario (Jacobs)	0	1	0	2	1	0	0	1	1	0	0	6
Saskatchewan (Virtue) 🔨	2	0	2	0	0	1	0	0	0	1	1	7

Sheet C	1	2	3	4	5	6	7	8	9	10	Final
Nova Scotia (Flemming)	0	0	1	0	2	0	1	0	1	0	5
Quebec (Ménard) 🔨	2	1	0	2	0	1	0	1	0	1	8

=== Draw 13 ===
Thursday, March 7, 1:30 pm

Sheet A	1	2	3	4	5	6	7	8	9	10	Final
Ontario (Howard) 🔨	1	0	2	0	1	0	1	0	0	1	6
Newfoundland and Labrador (Gushue)	0	1	0	1	0	2	0	0	1	0	5

Sheet B	1	2	3	4	5	6	7	8	9	10	Final
Prince Edward Island (MacKenzie)	0	1	0	0	1	0	0	X	X	X	2
Alberta (Martin) 🔨	2	0	1	1	0	2	1	X	X	X	7

Sheet C	1	2	3	4	5	6	7	8	9	10	Final
Northwest Territories/Yukon (Koe)	0	2	0	3	0	0	1	0	1	0	7
British Columbia (Bilesky) 🔨	2	0	1	0	1	1	0	1	0	2	8

Sheet D	1	2	3	4	5	6	7	8	9	10	Final
New Brunswick (Grattan)	0	1	0	0	1	1	0	0	1	1	5
Manitoba (Stoughton) 🔨	1	0	2	1	0	0	0	2	0	0	6

=== Draw 14 ===
Thursday, March 7, 7:30 pm

Sheet A	1	2	3	4	5	6	7	8	9	10	Final
Manitoba (Stoughton)	0	2	0	1	0	0	1	0	X	X	4
Northern Ontario (Jacobs) 🔨	2	0	1	0	1	1	0	4	X	X	9

Sheet B	1	2	3	4	5	6	7	8	9	10	Final
British Columbia (Bilesky)	0	2	0	2	0	0	1	0	1	0	6
Nova Scotia (Flemming) 🔨	0	0	3	0	0	2	0	2	0	2	9

Sheet C	1	2	3	4	5	6	7	8	9	10	Final
Alberta (Martin) 🔨	1	0	1	0	0	1	0	3	0	0	6
Saskatchewan (Virtue)	0	1	0	0	1	0	1	0	1	1	5

Sheet D	1	2	3	4	5	6	7	8	9	10	Final
Quebec (Ménard) 🔨	0	0	0	0	0	0	2	0	0	0	2
Ontario (Howard)	0	1	0	0	1	0	0	1	0	1	4

=== Draw 15 ===
Friday, March 8, 8:30 am

Sheet A	1	2	3	4	5	6	7	8	9	10	Final
New Brunswick (Grattan)	1	1	0	1	0	2	0	2	1	X	8
British Columbia (Bilesky) 🔨	0	0	2	0	1	0	1	0	0	X	4

Sheet B	1	2	3	4	5	6	7	8	9	10	Final
Manitoba (Stoughton)	0	0	1	1	0	2	0	0	1	0	5
Northwest Territories/Yukon (Koe) 🔨	2	0	0	0	1	0	0	1	0	3	7

Sheet C	1	2	3	4	5	6	7	8	9	10	Final
Prince Edward Island (MacKenzie) 🔨	0	1	0	0	0	0	0	0	X	X	1
Ontario (Howard)	1	0	2	0	0	0	0	3	X	X	6

Sheet D	1	2	3	4	5	6	7	8	9	10	Final
Newfoundland and Labrador (Gushue) 🔨	0	2	0	1	0	1	0	0	1	0	5
Alberta (Martin)	0	0	1	0	1	0	2	0	0	2	6

=== Draw 16 ===
Friday, March 8, 1:30 pm

Sheet A	1	2	3	4	5	6	7	8	9	10	11	Final
Nova Scotia (Flemming)	0	0	1	0	0	0	2	0	0	1	0	4
Prince Edward Island (MacKenzie) 🔨	0	1	0	1	0	1	0	1	0	0	1	5

Sheet B	1	2	3	4	5	6	7	8	9	10	Final
Newfoundland and Labrador (Gushue)	0	0	2	0	0	0	0	2	0	1	5
Quebec (Ménard) 🔨	1	0	0	0	1	0	0	0	2	0	4

Sheet C	1	2	3	4	5	6	7	8	9	10	Final
Northern Ontario (Jacobs)	1	0	2	0	0	2	0	0	2	X	7
New Brunswick (Grattan) 🔨	0	1	0	2	0	0	1	0	0	X	4

Sheet D	1	2	3	4	5	6	7	8	9	10	Final
Saskatchewan (Virtue) 🔨	0	0	1	1	1	1	0	2	0	X	6
Northwest Territories/Yukon (Koe)	1	1	0	0	0	0	3	0	5	X	10

=== Draw 17 ===
Friday, March 8, 7:30 pm

Sheet A	1	2	3	4	5	6	7	8	9	10	Final
Quebec (Ménard)	0	0	0	2	1	0	1	0	1	X	5
Saskatchewan (Virtue) 🔨	3	1	1	0	0	1	0	2	0	X	8

Sheet B	1	2	3	4	5	6	7	8	9	10	Final
Alberta (Martin) 🔨	2	0	0	1	0	0	1	1	0	1	6
Ontario (Howard)	0	2	0	0	2	0	0	0	1	0	5

Sheet C	1	2	3	4	5	6	7	8	9	10	11	Final
British Columbia (Bilesky) 🔨	0	1	0	2	0	0	1	0	0	1	0	5
Manitoba (Stoughton)	1	0	2	0	1	1	0	0	0	0	1	6

Sheet D	1	2	3	4	5	6	7	8	9	10	Final
Nova Scotia (Flemming)	0	0	0	0	0	1	0	1	0	0	2
Northern Ontario (Jacobs) 🔨	1	0	0	0	0	0	1	0	0	3	5

== Playoffs ==
Page playoff system
1	Ontario	6
2	Manitoba	7
3	Newfoundland and Labrador	5
4	Northern Ontario	6

Semifinal
1	Ontario	7
4	Northern Ontario	9

Final
2	Manitoba	4
4	Northern Ontario	11

Bronze Medal Game
1	Ontario	7
3	Newfoundland and Labrador	6

=== 1 vs. 2 ===
Saturday, March 9, 1:30 pm

Sheet C	1	2	3	4	5	6	7	8	9	10	Final
Ontario (Howard) 🔨	0	2	0	0	2	0	0	1	1	0	6
Manitoba (Stoughton)	0	0	1	1	0	2	0	0	0	3	7

Player percentages
Ontario		Manitoba	
Craig Savill	96%	Mark Nichols	93%
Brent Laing	96%	Reid Carruthers	93%
Wayne Middaugh	83%	Jon Mead	88%
Glenn Howard	80%	Jeff Stoughton	86%
Total	89%	Total	90%

=== 3 vs. 4 ===
Saturday, March 9, 6:30 pm

Sheet C	1	2	3	4	5	6	7	8	9	10	11	Final
Newfoundland and Labrador (Gushue) 🔨	0	1	0	1	0	0	1	0	1	1	0	5
Northern Ontario (Jacobs)	0	0	2	0	2	0	0	1	0	0	1	6

Player percentages
Newfoundland and Labrador		Northern Ontario	
Geoff Walker	91%	Ryan Harnden	85%
Adam Casey	80%	E. J. Harnden	98%
Brett Gallant	90%	Ryan Fry	93%
Brad Gushue	89%	Brad Jacobs	90%
Total	87%	Total	91%

=== Semifinal ===
Sunday, March 10, 8:30 am

Sheet C	1	2	3	4	5	6	7	8	9	10	Final
Ontario (Howard) 🔨	2	0	2	0	0	1	0	0	2	0	7
Northern Ontario (Jacobs)	0	2	0	2	2	0	2	1	0	0	9

Player percentages
Ontario		Northern Ontario	
Craig Savill	96%	Ryan Harnden	89%
Brent Laing	93%	E. J. Harnden	96%
Wayne Middaugh	90%	Ryan Fry	94%
Glenn Howard	78%	Brad Jacobs	90%
Total	89%	Total	92%

=== Bronze medal game ===
Sunday, March 10, 1:30 pm

Sheet C	1	2	3	4	5	6	7	8	9	10	11	Final
Ontario (Howard) 🔨	2	0	2	0	0	0	1	0	1	0	1	7
Newfoundland and Labrador (Gushue)	0	2	0	1	1	0	0	1	0	1	0	6

Player percentages
Ontario		Newfoundland and Labrador	
Craig Savill	95%	Geoff Walker	94%
Brent Laing	83%	Adam Casey	85%
Wayne Middaugh	82%	Brett Gallant	91%
Glenn Howard	86%	Brad Gushue	93%
Total	87%	Total	91%

=== Final ===
Sunday, March 10, 6:30 pm

Sheet C	1	2	3	4	5	6	7	8	9	10	Final
Manitoba (Stoughton) 🔨	0	0	2	0	2	0	0	0	0	X	4
Northern Ontario (Jacobs)	2	1	0	3	0	2	0	1	2	X	11

Player percentages
Manitoba		Northern Ontario	
Mark Nichols	100%	Ryan Harnden	100%
Reid Carruthers	94%	E. J. Harnden	99%
Jon Mead	93%	Ryan Fry	94%
Jeff Stoughton	72%	Brad Jacobs	88%
Total	90%	Total	95%

2013 Tim Hortons Brier
(Ontario)
Northern Ontario
Fifth title

== Statistics ==
=== Top 5 player percentages ===
Round robin only

Leads	%
(British Columbia) Aaron Watson	93
(New Brunswick) Peter Case	93
(Manitoba) Mark Nichols	92
(Alberta) Ben Hebert	91
(Quebec) Philippe Ménard	91

Seconds	%
(Ontario) Brent Laing	93
(Alberta) Marc Kennedy	90
(Manitoba) Reid Carruthers	87
(British Columbia) Derek Errington	86
(Saskatchewan) Chris Schille	85

Thirds	%
(Manitoba) Jon Mead	90
(Ontario) Wayne Middaugh	90
(Northern Ontario) Ryan Fry	88
(Quebec) Martin Crête	87
(Alberta) John Morris	86

Skips	%
(Ontario) Glenn Howard	89
(Newfoundland and Labrador) Brad Gushue	89
(Manitoba) Jeff Stoughton	86
(Alberta) Kevin Martin	84
(Quebec) Jean-Michel Ménard	83

=== Team percentages ===
Round Robin only

Province	Skip	%
Ontario	Glenn Howard	90
Manitoba	Jeff Stoughton	89
Alberta	Kevin Martin	88
Newfoundland and Labrador	Brad Gushue	87
Quebec	Jean-Michel Ménard	86
Northern Ontario	Brad Jacobs	86
British Columbia	Andrew Bilesky	85
New Brunswick	James Grattan	85
Saskatchewan	Brock Virtue	85
Nova Scotia	Paul Flemming	82
Northwest Territories/Yukon	Jamie Koe	82
Prince Edward Island	Eddie MacKenzie	80

=== Perfect games ===
Player	Team	Position	Shots	Opponent
Mark Nichols	Manitoba	Lead	16	Nova Scotia
Ryan Harnden	Northern Ontario	Lead	14	Alberta
Brad Jacobs	Northern Ontario	Skip	14	Alberta
Ben Hebert	Alberta	Lead	10	Nova Scotia
Philippe Ménard	Quebec	Lead	16	British Columbia
Craig Savill	Ontario	Lead	14	Newfoundland and Labrador
Brent Laing	Ontario	Second	14	Newfoundland and Labrador
Marc Kennedy	Alberta	Second	14	Prince Edward Island
Mark Nichols	Manitoba	Lead	18	Northern Ontario
Ryan Harnden	Northern Ontario	Lead	17	Manitoba

== Awards ==
The awards and all-star teams are listed as follows:

All-Star Teams

First Team

- Skip: Glenn Howard, Ontario
- Third: Wayne Middaugh, Ontario
- Second: Brent Laing, Ontario
- Lead Mark Nichols, Manitoba

Second Team

- Skip: Brad Gushue, Newfoundland and Labrador
- Third: Jon Mead, Manitoba
- Second: Marc Kennedy, Alberta
- Lead: Craig Savill, Ontario

Ross Harstone Sportsmanship Award

- Paul Flemming, Nova Scotia skip

Scotty Harper Award

- Kevin Palmer, The Curling News, for the best curling story of 2012

Paul McLean Award

- Larry Wood, curling journalist, editor of The Tankard Times, Canadian Curling Hall of Fame inductee

Hec Gervais Most Valuable Player Award

- Brad Jacobs, Northern Ontario skip

== Provincial and territorial playdowns ==
- 2013 Boston Pizza Cup (Alberta)
- (British Columbia) 2013 Canadian Direct Insurance BC Men's Curling Championship
- 2013 Safeway Championship (Manitoba)
- (New Brunswick) 2013 Molson Canadian Men's Provincial Curling Championship
- 2013 Newfoundland and Labrador Tankard
- The Dominion 2013 Northern Ontario Men's Curling Championship
- 2013 Molson Coors Tankard (Nova Scotia)
- 2013 The Dominion Tankard (Ontario)
- (Prince Edward Island) 2013 PEI Tankard
- 2013 Quebec Men's Provincial Curling Championship
- 2013 SaskTel Tankard (Saskatchewan)
- (Northwest Territories) 2013 Yukon/NWT Men's Curling Championship
