= 2012 Curling Masters Champéry =

- Host city: Champéry, Switzerland
- Arena: Palladium de Champéry
- Dates: October 26–28
- Winner: (Sweden) Marcus Hasselborg
- Skip: Marcus Hasselborg
- Third: Peder Folke
- Second: Andreas Prytz
- Lead: Anton Sandström
- Finalist: (Switzerland) Peter de Cruz

The 2012 Curling Masters Champéry were held from October 26 to 28 at the Palladium de Champéry in Champéry, Switzerland as part of the 2012–13 World Curling Tour. The event was held in a round robin format, and the purse for the event was 40,000 CHF. Marcus Hasselborg defeated Peter de Cruz in the final with a score of 5–4.

== Teams ==
The teams are listed as follows:

| Skip | Third | Second | Lead | Locale |
|---|---|---|---|---|
| Alexander Baumann | Manuel Walter | Sebastian Schweizer | Jörg Engesser | Germany |
| Benoît Schwarz (fourth) | Peter de Cruz (skip) | Dominik Märki | Valentin Tanner | Switzerland |
| Tony Angiboust (fourth) | Thomas Dufour (skip) | Lionel Roux | Wilfrid Coulot | Chamonix, France |
| Kristian Lindström (fourth) | Oskar Eriksson (skip) | Markus Eriksson | Christoffer Sundgren | Karlstad, Sweden |
| Mario Freiberger | Sven Iten | Pascal Eicher | Rainer Kobler | Switzerland |
| James Grattan | Jason Roach | Darren Roach | Peter Case | (Canada) Oromocto, New Brunswick |
| Logan Gray | Ross Paterson | Alasdair Guthrie | Richard Woods | Stirling, Scotland |
| Ritvars Gulbis | Normunds Saršūns | Roberts Krusts | Aivars Avotiņš | Latvia |
| Mike Harris | Chris Ciasnocha | Scott Foster | Ken McDermott | Canada |
| Marcus Hasselborg | Peder Folke | Andreas Prytz | Anton Sandström | Sweden |
| Pascal Hess | Yves Hess | Florian Meister | Stefan Meienberg | Switzerland |
| Aku Kauste | Jani Sullanmaa | Pauli Jäämies | Janne Pitko | Hyvinkaa, Finland |
| Mikkel Krause | Oliver Dupont | Mads Norgaard | Dennis Hansen | Denmark |
| Steffen Mellemseter | Markus Høiberg | Steffen Walstad | Magnus Nedregotten | Norway |
| Sven Michel | Claudio Pätz | Sandro Trolliet | Simon Gempeler | Adelboden, Switzerland |
| Glen Muirhead | David Reid | Steven Mitchell | Kerr Drummond | Perth, Scotland |
| Krisztián Hall (fourth) | György Nagy (skip) | Gábor Ezsöl | Lajos Belleli | Hungary |
| Meico Öhninger | Andri Heimann | Kyrill Öhninger | Kevin Wunderlin | Switzerland |
| David Šik | Radek Boháč | Karel Uher | Milan Polívka | Czech Republic |
| Jiří Snítil | Martin Snítil | Jindřich Kitzberger | Marek Vydra | Brno, Czech Republic |
| Kyle Smith | Thomas Muirhead | Kyle Waddell | Cammy Smith | Perth, Scotland |
| Rasmus Stjerne | Johnny Frederiksen | Mikkel Poulsen | Troels Harry | Hvidovre, Denmark |
| Alexey Tselousov | Andrey Drozdov | Alexey Stukalsky | Artur Razhabov | Moscow, Russia |
| Bernhard Werthemann | Bastian Brun | Florian Zürrer | Päddy Käser | Switzerland |

== Round-robin standings ==
Final round-robin standings

Key
| Teams to Playoffs |

| Pool A | W | L |
|---|---|---|
| (Switzerland) Bernhard Werthemann | 5 | 0 |
| (Switzerland) Mario Freiberger | 4 | 1 |
| (Canada) Mike Harris | 2 | 3 |
| (Scotland) Kyle Smith | 2 | 3 |
| (Finland) Aku Kauste | 1 | 4 |
| (Denmark) Mikkel Krause | 1 | 4 |

| Pool B | W | L |
|---|---|---|
| (Switzerland) Peter de Cruz | 4 | 1 |
| (Czech Republic) David Šik | 3 | 2 |
| (France) Thomas Dufour | 3 | 2 |
| (Scotland) Glen Muirhead | 3 | 2 |
| (Norway) Steffen Mellemseter | 1 | 4 |
| (Hungary) György Nagy | 1 | 4 |

| Pool C | W | L |
|---|---|---|
| (Sweden) Marcus Hasselborg | 3 | 2 |
| (Denmark) Rasmus Stjerne | 3 | 2 |
| (Russia) Alexey Tselousov | 3 | 2 |
| (Switzerland) Pascal Hess | 3 | 2 |
| (Scotland) Logan Gray | 2 | 3 |
| (Latvia) Ritvars Gulbis | 1 | 4 |

| Pool D | W | L |
|---|---|---|
| (Germany) Alexander Baumann | 4 | 1 |
| (Sweden) Oskar Eriksson | 4 | 1 |
| (Switzerland) Sven Michel | 3 | 2 |
| (Canada) James Grattan | 3 | 2 |
| (Switzerland) Meico Öhninger | 1 | 4 |
| (Czech Republic) Jiří Snítil | 0 | 5 |

== Playoffs ==
The playoffs draw is listed as follows:

Quarterfinals
(Switzerland) Bernhard Werthemann | 6
(Czech Republic) David Šik | 5
(Sweden) Marcus Hasselborg | 5
(Sweden) Oskar Eriksson | 0
(Switzerland) Peter de Cruz | 5
(Switzerland) Mario Freiberger | 4
(Germany) Alexander Baumann | 3
(Denmark) Rasmus Stjerne | 6

Semifinals
(Switzerland) Bernhard Werthemann | 2
(Sweden) Marcus Hasselborg | 3
(Switzerland) Peter de Cruz | 3
(Denmark) Rasmus Stjerne | 2

Final
(Sweden) Marcus Hasselborg | 5
(Switzerland) Peter de Cruz | 4
