= 2015 Tim Hortons Brier =

- Host city: Calgary, Alberta
- Arena: Scotiabank Saddledome
- Dates: February 28 – March 8
- Attendance: 151,835
- Winner: Canada
- Curling club: Glencoe CC, Calgary
- Skip: Pat Simmons
- Third: John Morris
- Second: Carter Rycroft
- Lead: Nolan Thiessen
- Alternate: Tom Sallows
- Coach: Earle Morris
- Finalist: Northern Ontario (Brad Jacobs)

The 2015 Tim Hortons Brier was held from February 28 to March 8 at Scotiabank Saddledome in Calgary, Alberta, Canada.

In the final, the team of Pat Simmons, John Morris, Carter Rycroft and Nolan Thiessen, representing "Team Canada" as defending Brier champions defeated the reigning Olympic gold medallist Brad Jacobs rink, representing Northern Ontario. Simmons had to make a draw to the button in an extra end to win the championship. With the victory, the Simmons rink went on to represent Canada at the 2015 Ford World Men's Curling Championship in Halifax, where they won the bronze medal.

== Changes to competition format ==
For the first time, the event was expanded to include an entry from Nunavut, which has previously not participated in the Brier. Another notable change was having separate entries for the Yukon and Northwest Territories, which had historically competed as a single entry.

Starting with the 2015 tournament, the top ten teams automatically qualified to the main tournament, which was a competition between twelve teams as in years past. An eleventh team was the defending champions from the previous Brier who played as Team Canada. The four remaining unqualified teams played in a pre-qualifying tournament to determine the twelfth team to play in the main tournament.

It was the first time in the history of the Brier that a Team Canada partook, which essentially allowed the defending champions direct re-entry into the event. The skip of the previous year's winning team, Kevin Koe, formed a new team in the off-season and was not part of Team Canada. Koe won the 2015 Boston Pizza Cup with his new team and represented Alberta at the 2015 Brier. Koe's former teammates recruited John Morris to skip the first ever edition of Team Canada at the Brier. Morris was the runner-up from the previous year.

Similar changes were also implemented for the 2015 Scotties Tournament of Hearts, meaning that for the first time the Canadian men's and women's curling championships will be conducted using identical formats. Previous versions of the Scotties Tournament of Hearts differed from the Brier in that they included a Team Canada entry, but did not include a separate entry from Northern Ontario.

== Teams ==
The teams are listed as follows:

Canada	Alberta	British Columbia
The Glencoe Club, Calgary Skip: Pat Simmons (Note: Morris skipped the first five games, and Simmons skipped the remaining six games.); Third: John Morris; Second: Carter Rycroft; Lead: Nolan Thiessen; Alternate: Tom Sallows	The Glencoe Club, Calgary Skip: Kevin Koe; Third: Marc Kennedy; Second: Brent Laing; Lead: Ben Hebert; Alternate: Jamie King	Vernon CC, Vernon & Kelowna CC, Kelowna Skip: Jim Cotter; Third: Ryan Kuhn; Second: Tyrel Griffith; Lead: Rick Sawatsky; Alternate: Grant Olsen
Manitoba	New Brunswick	Newfoundland and Labrador
West St. Paul CC, West St. Paul Skip: Reid Carruthers; Third: Braeden Moskowy; Second: Derek Samagalski; Lead: Colin Hodgson; Alternate: Steve Gould	Thistle-St. Andrew's CC, Saint John Skip: Jeremy Mallais; Third: Zach Eldridge; Second: Chris Jeffrey; Lead: Jared Bezanson; Alternate: Jason Vaughan	Bally Haly G&CC, St. John's Skip: Brad Gushue; Third: Mark Nichols; Second: Brett Gallant; Lead: Geoff Walker
Northern Ontario	Nova Scotia	Ontario
Soo CA, Sault Ste. Marie Skip: Brad Jacobs; Third: Ryan Fry; Second: E. J. Harnden; Lead: Ryan Harnden; Alternate: Eric Harnden	Mayflower CC, Halifax Fourth: Peter Burgess; Skip: Glen MacLeod; Second: Colten Steele; Lead: Robbie McLean; Alternate: Paul Flemming	Fenelon Falls CC, Fenelon Falls Skip: Mark Kean; Third: Mathew Camm; Second: David Mathers; Lead: Scott Howard; Alternate: Bryan Cochrane
Prince Edward Island	Quebec	Saskatchewan
Silver Fox C&YC, Summerside; Charlottetown CC, Charlottetown Skip: Adam Casey; Third: Josh Barry; Second: Anson Carmody; Lead: Robbie Doherty; Alternate: Robert Campbell	CC Etchemin, Saint-Romuald Skip: Jean-Michel Ménard; Third: Martin Crête; Second: Éric Sylvain; Lead: Philippe Ménard; Alternate: Pierre Charette	Nutana CC, Saskatoon Skip: Steve Laycock; Third: Kirk Muyres; Second: Colton Flasch; Lead: Dallan Muyres; Alternate: Gerry Adam
Northwest Territories	Nunavut	Yukon
Yellowknife CC, Yellowknife Skip: Jamie Koe; Third: Mark Whitehead; Second: Brad Chorostkowski; Lead: Robert Borden; Alternate: Bill Merklinger	No team (declined invitation)	Whitehorse CC, Whitehorse Skip: Bob Smallwood; Third: Wade Scoffin; Second: Steve Fecteau; Lead: Clint Ireland; Alternate: Scott Odian

=== CTRS ranking ===
The #1 ranked Mike McEwen rink lost in the Manitoba final.

Member Association (Skip)	Rank	Points
Northern Ontario (Jacobs)	2	189.120
Newfoundland and Labrador (Gushue)	3	174.950
Manitoba (Carruthers)	4	138.430
Saskatchewan (Laycock)	5	132.315
Alberta (K. Koe)	6	126.730
Prince Edward Island (Casey)	11	78.555
Quebec (Ménard)	13	51.145
Ontario (Kean)	14	49.075
British Columbia (Cotter)	15	37.675
Canada (Morris)	17	33.000
New Brunswick (Mallais)	NR	0.000
Northwest Territories (J. Koe)	NR	0.000
Nova Scotia (MacLeod)	NR	0.000
Yukon (Smallwood)	NR	0.000

== Map of teams ==
Team Canada Provincial Winners

== Relegation playoff ==
=== Combined record of each province/territory from 2012 to 2014 ===
Key
Team directly qualifies to play in the tournament
Team must play in a pre-tournament round-robin to qualify

Locale	W	L	Locale	W	L
Manitoba	25	8	Northwest Territories	15	18
Ontario	25	8	British Columbia	14	19
Alberta	24	9	Saskatchewan	14	19
Newfoundland and Labrador	19	14	Prince Edward Island	9	24
Quebec	17	16	Nova Scotia	5	28
New Brunswick	16	17	Yukon	0	0
Northern Ontario	15	18	Nunavut (declined to play)	0	0

Nunavut declined to send a team while Prince Edward Island, Nova Scotia, and the Yukon played a single round-robin at the Scotiabank Saddledome in order to determine which one of the three teams would qualify for the tournament. The teams with the two best records were to advance to the play-in game which was contested Saturday, February 28, concurrent with the opening draw of the Brier round-robin. However, each team finished the round robin tied with a 1-1 record which saw Nova Scotia eliminated based on pregame draws to the button. Prince Edward Island then defeated the Yukon to advance to the main draw of the tournament.

=== Round-robin standings ===
Locale	Skip	W	L	PF	PA	EW	EL	BE	SE	S%
Yukon	Bob Smallwood	1	1	13	10	9	6	1	5	73%
Prince Edward Island	Adam Casey	1	1	12	11	6	9	0	1	79%
Nova Scotia	Glen MacLeod	1	1	12	16	8	8	0	2	75%

=== Round-robin results ===
All draw times are listed in Mountain Standard Time (UTC−7).

==== Draw 1 ====
Thursday, February 26, 7:00 pm

Sheet B	1	2	3	4	5	6	7	8	9	10	Final
Yukon (Smallwood) 🔨	2	2	0	1	1	1	1	X	X	X	8
Prince Edward Island (Casey)	0	0	1	0	0	0	0	X	X	X	1

==== Draw 2 ====
Friday, February 27, 8:00 am

Sheet B	1	2	3	4	5	6	7	8	9	10	Final
Nova Scotia (MacLeod) 🔨	2	0	3	0	0	1	0	1	2	X	9
Yukon (Smallwood)	0	2	0	2	1	0	0	0	0	X	5

==== Draw 3 ====
Friday, February 27, 3:30 pm

Sheet B	1	2	3	4	5	6	7	8	9	10	Final
Prince Edward Island (Casey) 🔨	2	0	1	4	0	2	0	2	X	X	11
Nova Scotia (MacLeod)	0	1	0	0	1	0	1	0	X	X	3

=== Pre-qualifying final ===
Saturday, February 28, 1:30 pm

Sheet D	1	2	3	4	5	6	7	8	9	10	11	Final
Yukon (Smallwood) 🔨	1	1	0	0	0	2	0	0	1	1	0	6
Prince Edward Island (Casey)	0	0	3	1	1	0	0	1	0	0	1	7

== Round-robin standings ==
Final round-robin standings

Key
Teams to Playoffs
Teams to 2016 Relegation Round

Locale	Skip	W	L	PF	PA	EW	EL	BE	SE	S%
Northern Ontario	Brad Jacobs	10	1	80	39	49	34	18	11	88%
Newfoundland and Labrador	Brad Gushue	9	2	80	61	51	42	12	11	85%
Saskatchewan	Steve Laycock	7	4	68	58	42	40	23	8	86%
Canada	Pat Simmons	7	4	64	61	44	43	17	9	87%
Alberta	Kevin Koe	6	5	72	63	49	42	13	14	89%
Quebec	Jean-Michel Ménard	6	5	70	67	45	50	11	4	85%
British Columbia	Jim Cotter	5	6	63	60	46	38	21	10	82%
Ontario	Mark Kean	5	6	64	79	41	49	14	6	83%
Prince Edward Island	Adam Casey	5	6	64	69	44	48	11	11	83%
Manitoba	Reid Carruthers	4	7	66	63	41	46	13	8	88%
New Brunswick	Jeremy Mallais	2	9	50	79	38	50	10	4	81%
Northwest Territories	Jamie Koe	0	11	46	88	37	47	12	4	79%

== Round-robin results ==
All draw times are listed in Mountain Standard Time (UTC−7).

=== Draw 1 ===
Saturday, February 28, 1:30 pm

Sheet A	1	2	3	4	5	6	7	8	9	10	Final
Northern Ontario (Jacobs) 🔨	0	2	0	1	0	1	0	2	0	1	7
Quebec (Ménard)	0	0	1	0	1	0	1	0	1	0	4

Sheet B	1	2	3	4	5	6	7	8	9	10	Final
Saskatchewan (Laycock)	0	0	0	1	0	1	0	3	0	0	5
Newfoundland and Labrador (Gushue) 🔨	0	1	0	0	2	0	1	0	0	3	7

Sheet C	1	2	3	4	5	6	7	8	9	10	Final
Canada (Morris) 🔨	0	1	0	0	0	2	1	1	0	1	6
Manitoba (Carruthers)	0	0	2	0	1	0	0	0	1	0	4

=== Draw 2 ===
Saturday, February 28, 6:30 pm

Sheet A	1	2	3	4	5	6	7	8	9	10	Final
Manitoba (Carruthers)	0	1	0	0	1	0	0	2	0	X	4
Saskatchewan (Laycock) 🔨	2	0	0	2	0	0	2	0	1	X	7

Sheet B	1	2	3	4	5	6	7	8	9	10	11	Final
Alberta (K. Koe)	0	1	0	2	0	1	1	0	0	2	0	7
British Columbia (Cotter) 🔨	1	0	2	0	2	0	0	0	2	0	1	8

Sheet C	1	2	3	4	5	6	7	8	9	10	Final
Ontario (Kean) 🔨	1	0	2	0	3	0	0	0	1	1	8
Prince Edward Island (Casey)	0	1	0	2	0	2	1	1	0	0	7

Sheet D	1	2	3	4	5	6	7	8	9	10	Final
Northwest Territories (J. Koe)	0	0	2	0	2	0	0	0	1	0	5
New Brunswick (Mallais) 🔨	1	0	0	1	0	0	1	1	0	2	6

=== Draw 3 ===
Sunday, March 1, 8:30 am

Sheet B	1	2	3	4	5	6	7	8	9	10	Final
Ontario (Kean) 🔨	2	0	3	0	2	0	1	0	1	0	9
Quebec (Ménard)	0	2	0	1	0	2	0	2	0	1	8

Sheet C	1	2	3	4	5	6	7	8	9	10	Final
Northern Ontario (Jacobs)🔨	0	2	0	0	2	0	2	0	3	X	9
Alberta (K. Koe)	0	0	2	1	0	1	0	1	0	X	5

Sheet D	1	2	3	4	5	6	7	8	9	10	11	Final
Newfoundland and Labrador (Gushue)🔨	0	3	0	2	0	1	0	1	0	0	2	9
Canada (Morris)	0	0	1	0	2	0	3	0	0	1	0	7

=== Draw 4 ===
Sunday, March 1, 1:30 pm

Sheet A	1	2	3	4	5	6	7	8	9	10	Final
Newfoundland and Labrador (Gushue)	1	0	3	0	0	1	0	3	0	X	8
Northwest Territories (J. Koe)🔨	0	1	0	1	1	0	1	0	1	X	5

Sheet B	1	2	3	4	5	6	7	8	9	10	Final
Prince Edward Island (Casey)	1	0	1	2	0	0	1	0	1	1	7
Canada (Morris)🔨	0	1	0	0	1	1	0	1	0	0	4

Sheet C	1	2	3	4	5	6	7	8	9	10	Final
New Brunswick (Mallais)🔨	1	0	1	1	0	1	0	1	0	X	5
Quebec (Ménard)	0	2	0	0	3	0	2	0	1	X	8

Sheet D	1	2	3	4	5	6	7	8	9	10	Final
Northern Ontario (Jacobs)🔨	2	0	1	0	1	0	0	1	2	0	7
British Columbia (Cotter)	0	2	0	1	0	1	0	0	0	1	5

=== Draw 5 ===
Sunday, March 1, 6:30 pm

Sheet A	1	2	3	4	5	6	7	8	9	10	Final
Prince Edward Island (Casey) 🔨	0	1	0	1	0	2	0	2	0	0	6
British Columbia (Cotter)	0	0	1	0	1	0	1	0	1	1	5

Sheet B	1	2	3	4	5	6	7	8	9	10	Final
New Brunswick (Mallais)	0	1	0	0	2	0	0	1	0	X	4
Manitoba (Carruthers) 🔨	1	0	2	1	0	2	1	0	2	X	9

Sheet C	1	2	3	4	5	6	7	8	9	10	Final
Northwest Territories (J. Koe)	0	1	0	0	2	1	0	2	X	X	6
Saskatchewan (Laycock) 🔨	2	0	0	4	0	0	4	0	X	X	10

Sheet D	1	2	3	4	5	6	7	8	9	10	Final
Ontario (Kean) 🔨	1	0	0	1	0	1	0	0	0	X	3
Alberta (K. Koe)	0	2	0	0	2	0	0	2	1	X	7

=== Draw 6 ===
Monday, March 2, 1:30 pm

Sheet A	1	2	3	4	5	6	7	8	9	10	Final
New Brunswick (Mallais)	0	2	0	1	0	0	2	0	0	0	5
Canada (Morris) 🔨	1	0	1	0	0	1	0	1	0	2	6

Sheet B	1	2	3	4	5	6	7	8	9	10	Final
Northwest Territories (J. Koe)	0	0	0	1	0	1	0	2	X	X	4
Northern Ontario (Jacobs) 🔨	0	2	1	0	4	0	2	0	X	X	9

Sheet C	1	2	3	4	5	6	7	8	9	10	Final
Newfoundland and Labrador (Gushue) 🔨	0	2	0	1	0	0	0	0	0	0	3
British Columbia (Cotter)	0	0	2	0	0	0	0	1	1	2	6

Sheet D	1	2	3	4	5	6	7	8	9	10	Final
Prince Edward Island (Casey)	0	0	2	0	2	0	0	0	1	0	5
Quebec (Ménard) 🔨	0	1	0	2	0	2	0	0	0	1	6

=== Draw 7 ===
Monday, March 2, 6:30 pm

Sheet A	1	2	3	4	5	6	7	8	9	10	Final
Alberta (K. Koe)	1	0	2	0	0	1	1	1	0	1	7
Quebec (Ménard) 🔨	0	2	0	1	0	0	0	0	2	0	5

Sheet B	1	2	3	4	5	6	7	8	9	10	Final
Saskatchewan (Laycock) 🔨	3	0	1	3	0	1	0	0	X	X	8
Canada (Morris)	0	0	0	0	2	0	1	1	X	X	4

Sheet C	1	2	3	4	5	6	7	8	9	10	Final
Northern Ontario (Jacobs) 🔨	0	0	3	1	0	0	2	0	1	X	7
Ontario (Kean)	0	0	0	0	0	1	0	2	0	X	3

Sheet D	1	2	3	4	5	6	7	8	9	10	Final
Manitoba (Carruthers) 🔨	2	0	0	0	2	0	3	0	1	X	8
Newfoundland and Labrador (Gushue)	0	0	1	1	0	1	0	2	0	X	5

=== Draw 8 ===
Tuesday, March 3, 8:30 am

Sheet A	1	2	3	4	5	6	7	8	9	10	Final
Manitoba (Carruthers)	1	2	0	5	0	2	0	1	X	X	11
Northwest Territories (J. Koe) 🔨	0	0	1	0	1	0	1	0	X	X	3

Sheet B	1	2	3	4	5	6	7	8	9	10	Final
Prince Edward Island (Casey)	0	1	0	2	0	0	0	1	X	X	4
Alberta (K. Koe) 🔨	2	0	3	0	2	0	1	0	X	X	8

Sheet C	1	2	3	4	5	6	7	8	9	10	Final
Saskatchewan (Laycock)	1	0	0	2	0	1	0	3	0	X	7
New Brunswick (Mallais) 🔨	0	0	1	0	2	0	0	0	1	X	4

Sheet D	1	2	3	4	5	6	7	8	9	10	Final
Ontario (Kean)	0	0	0	1	0	0	0	2	0	X	3
British Columbia (Cotter) 🔨	0	2	1	0	1	0	0	0	4	X	8

=== Draw 9 ===
Tuesday, March 3, 1:30 pm

Sheet A	1	2	3	4	5	6	7	8	9	10	Final
Northern Ontario (Jacobs) 🔨	1	1	2	2	3	1	0	1	X	X	11
Prince Edward Island (Casey)	0	0	0	0	0	0	1	0	X	X	1

Sheet B	1	2	3	4	5	6	7	8	9	10	Final
Newfoundland and Labrador (Gushue) 🔨	1	1	1	0	2	0	2	3	X	X	10
New Brunswick (Mallais)	0	0	0	1	0	1	0	0	X	X	2

Sheet C	1	2	3	4	5	6	7	8	9	10	Final
Quebec (Ménard)	0	0	2	0	2	0	0	0	4	0	8
British Columbia (Cotter) 🔨	0	1	0	1	0	1	1	1	0	1	6

Sheet D	1	2	3	4	5	6	7	8	9	10	Final
Northwest Territories (J. Koe)	0	0	0	1	0	0	1	0	1	0	3
Canada (Simmons) 🔨	0	0	1	0	1	2	0	1	0	1	6

=== Draw 10 ===
Tuesday, March 3, 6:30 pm

Sheet A	1	2	3	4	5	6	7	8	9	10	Final
Newfoundland and Labrador (Gushue) 🔨	2	0	0	2	0	0	1	1	0	2	8
Ontario (Kean)	0	2	1	0	1	1	0	0	1	0	6

Sheet B	1	2	3	4	5	6	7	8	9	10	Final
Manitoba (Carruthers)	0	0	0	0	1	0	1	0	X	X	2
Northern Ontario (Jacobs) 🔨	2	2	0	0	0	2	0	1	X	X	7

Sheet C	1	2	3	4	5	6	7	8	9	10	Final
Canada (Simmons)	0	2	0	1	0	0	0	0	2	1	6
Alberta (K. Koe) 🔨	1	0	1	0	0	1	0	0	0	0	3

Sheet D	1	2	3	4	5	6	7	8	9	10	Final
Quebec (Ménard) 🔨	2	0	2	0	0	0	1	0	0	2	7
Saskatchewan (Laycock)	0	1	0	2	0	0	0	1	1	0	5

=== Draw 11 ===
Wednesday, March 4, 8:30 am

Sheet A	1	2	3	4	5	6	7	8	9	10	Final
Canada (Simmons)	0	0	1	0	0	2	0	3	0	2	8
British Columbia (Cotter) 🔨	1	0	0	2	0	0	2	0	2	0	7

Sheet B	1	2	3	4	5	6	7	8	9	10	Final
Quebec (Ménard) 🔨	2	0	0	1	1	0	3	0	1	X	8
Northwest Territories (J. Koe)	0	1	0	0	0	2	0	2	0	X	5

Sheet C	1	2	3	4	5	6	7	8	9	10	Final
Newfoundland and Labrador (Gushue)	0	1	0	3	3	1	0	1	0	X	9
Prince Edward Island (Casey) 🔨	1	0	2	0	0	0	2	0	1	X	6

Sheet D	1	2	3	4	5	6	7	8	9	10	Final
New Brunswick (Mallais)	0	0	0	1	0	2	0	1	0	X	4
Northern Ontario (Jacobs) 🔨	0	3	0	0	2	0	1	0	1	X	7

=== Draw 12 ===
Wednesday, March 4, 1:30 pm

Sheet A	1	2	3	4	5	6	7	8	9	10	Final
Saskatchewan (Laycock)	0	1	0	1	0	0	0	0	1	0	3
Northern Ontario (Jacobs) 🔨	1	0	1	0	1	0	0	1	0	1	5

Sheet B	1	2	3	4	5	6	7	8	9	10	Final
Ontario (Kean)	0	0	0	1	0	1	0	2	0	0	4
Canada (Simmons) 🔨	1	0	1	0	0	0	2	0	2	1	7

Sheet C	1	2	3	4	5	6	7	8	9	10	Final
Manitoba (Carruthers)	0	1	1	0	0	1	0	1	0	X	4
Quebec (Ménard) 🔨	2	0	0	1	1	0	1	0	2	X	7

Sheet D	1	2	3	4	5	6	7	8	9	10	Final
Alberta (K. Koe)	0	1	0	2	1	0	1	0	2	0	7
Newfoundland and Labrador (Gushue) 🔨	2	0	2	0	0	1	0	2	0	1	8

=== Draw 13 ===
Wednesday, March 4, 6:30 pm

Sheet A	1	2	3	4	5	6	7	8	9	10	Final
Alberta (K. Koe)	0	0	2	0	2	1	0	0	2	X	7
Northwest Territories (J. Koe) 🔨	0	1	0	2	0	0	1	0	0	X	4

Sheet B	1	2	3	4	5	6	7	8	9	10	11	Final
Saskatchewan (Laycock)	0	0	0	2	0	2	0	1	1	0	1	7
Prince Edward Island (Casey) 🔨	0	0	1	0	3	0	1	0	0	1	0	6

Sheet C	1	2	3	4	5	6	7	8	9	10	Final
Ontario (Kean) 🔨	0	2	0	1	0	0	1	0	X	X	4
New Brunswick (Mallais)	2	0	1	0	2	3	0	1	X	X	9

Sheet D	1	2	3	4	5	6	7	8	9	10	Final
Manitoba (Carruthers) 🔨	0	2	0	0	2	1	0	3	X	X	8
British Columbia (Cotter)	1	0	0	1	0	0	1	0	X	X	3

=== Draw 14 ===
Thursday, March 5, 8:30 am

Sheet A	1	2	3	4	5	6	7	8	9	10	Final
Prince Edward Island (Casey)	0	4	1	0	1	1	0	0	1	X	8
New Brunswick (Mallais) 🔨	2	0	0	1	0	0	0	1	0	X	4

Sheet B	1	2	3	4	5	6	7	8	9	10	Final
Newfoundland and Labrador (Gushue) 🔨	0	1	1	1	0	1	0	1	0	1	6
Northern Ontario (Jacobs)	0	0	0	0	1	0	3	0	1	0	5

Sheet C	1	2	3	4	5	6	7	8	9	10	Final
British Columbia (Cotter) 🔨	0	2	0	0	1	1	0	0	2	X	6
Northwest Territories (J. Koe)	0	0	0	1	0	0	0	1	0	X	2

Sheet D	1	2	3	4	5	6	7	8	9	10	Final
Quebec (Ménard)	0	0	1	0	1	0	1	0	2	X	5
Canada (Simmons) 🔨	0	1	0	2	0	2	0	2	0	X	7

=== Draw 15 ===
Thursday, March 5, 1:30 pm

Sheet A	1	2	3	4	5	6	7	8	9	10	Final
Manitoba (Carruthers) 🔨	2	0	0	2	0	0	1	0	2	0	7
Ontario (Kean)	0	3	1	0	0	1	0	2	0	1	8

Sheet B	1	2	3	4	5	6	7	8	9	10	Final
New Brunswick (Mallais) 🔨	0	2	0	1	0	0	1	0	0	X	4
British Columbia (Cotter)	1	0	2	0	1	1	0	2	0	X	7

Sheet C	1	2	3	4	5	6	7	8	9	10	Final
Alberta (K. Koe) 🔨	1	0	2	0	1	0	0	1	0	0	5
Saskatchewan (Laycock)	0	1	0	1	0	1	1	0	0	2	6

Sheet D	1	2	3	4	5	6	7	8	9	10	Final
Northwest Territories (J. Koe)	0	1	0	1	1	0	0	2	X	X	5
Prince Edward Island (Casey) 🔨	2	0	2	0	0	4	1	0	X	X	9

=== Draw 16 ===
Thursday, March 5, 6:30 pm

Sheet A	1	2	3	4	5	6	7	8	9	10	Final
Quebec (Ménard)	0	0	1	0	0	1	0	2	0	0	4
Newfoundland and Labrador (Gushue) 🔨	0	1	0	2	0	0	2	0	1	1	7

Sheet B	1	2	3	4	5	6	7	8	9	10	Final
Alberta (K. Koe)	0	0	0	2	1	0	2	0	2	1	8
Manitoba (Carruthers) 🔨	1	0	1	0	0	3	0	2	0	0	7

Sheet C	1	2	3	4	5	6	7	8	9	10	Final
Northern Ontario (Jacobs) 🔨	1	0	0	0	0	1	0	2	0	2	6
Canada (Simmons)	0	1	0	0	0	0	1	0	1	0	3

Sheet D	1	2	3	4	5	6	7	8	9	10	11	Final
Ontario (Kean) 🔨	1	0	0	0	0	1	0	5	0	0	1	8
Saskatchewan (Laycock)	0	1	0	0	0	0	3	0	1	2	0	7

=== Draw 17 ===
Friday, March 6, 8:30 am

Sheet A	1	2	3	4	5	6	7	8	9	10	Final
British Columbia (Cotter)	0	0	0	0	0	1	0	1	0	X	2
Saskatchewan (Laycock) 🔨	0	1	0	0	1	0	1	0	1	X	4

Sheet B	1	2	3	4	5	6	7	8	9	10	Final
Ontario (Kean) 🔨	0	2	2	0	2	0	2	0	X	X	8
Northwest Territories (J. Koe)	1	0	0	1	0	1	0	1	X	X	4

Sheet C	1	2	3	4	5	6	7	8	9	10	Final
Prince Edward Island (Casey)	0	1	1	0	0	1	0	0	1	1	5
Manitoba (Carruthers) 🔨	0	0	0	1	0	0	0	1	0	0	2

Sheet D	1	2	3	4	5	6	7	8	9	10	Final
Alberta (K. Koe)	1	0	3	1	1	0	0	2	X	X	8
New Brunswick (Mallais) 🔨	0	1	0	0	0	1	1	0	X	X	3

== Playoffs ==
Page playoff system
1	Northern Ontario	7
2	Newfoundland and Labrador	5
3	Saskatchewan	7
4	Canada	8

Semifinal
2	Newfoundland and Labrador	6
4	Canada	8

Final
1	Northern Ontario	5
4	Canada	6

Bronze Medal Game
2	Newfoundland and Labrador	5
3	Saskatchewan	7

=== 1 vs. 2 ===
Friday, March 6, 6:30 pm

Sheet B	1	2	3	4	5	6	7	8	9	10	Final
Northern Ontario (Jacobs) 🔨	1	0	0	0	3	0	1	0	2	X	7
Newfoundland and Labrador (Gushue)	0	2	0	1	0	1	0	1	0	X	5

Player percentages
Northern Ontario		Newfoundland and Labrador	
Ryan Harnden	91%	Geoff Walker	94%
E. J. Harnden	88%	Brett Gallant	95%
Ryan Fry	84%	Mark Nichols	89%
Brad Jacobs	84%	Brad Gushue	82%
Total	87%	Total	90%

=== 3 vs. 4 ===
Saturday, March 7, 1:00 pm

Sheet B	1	2	3	4	5	6	7	8	9	10	11	Final
Saskatchewan (Laycock) 🔨	1	0	0	1	0	1	0	2	0	2	0	7
Canada (Simmons)	0	1	0	0	3	0	1	0	2	0	1	8

Player percentages
Saskatchewan		Canada	
Dallan Muyres	89%	Nolan Thiessen	93%
Colton Flasch	82%	Carter Rycroft	92%
Kirk Muyres	75%	John Morris	85%
Steve Laycock	78%	Pat Simmons	89%
Total	81%	Total	90%

=== Semifinal ===
Saturday, March 7, 6:00 pm

Sheet C	1	2	3	4	5	6	7	8	9	10	Final
Newfoundland and Labrador (Gushue) 🔨	1	0	1	0	0	2	0	0	2	0	6
Canada (Simmons)	0	2	0	1	0	0	0	2	0	3	8

Player percentages
Newfoundland and Labrador		Canada	
Geoff Walker	86%	Nolan Thiessen	95%
Brett Gallant	76%	Carter Rycroft	79%
Mark Nichols	86%	John Morris	78%
Brad Gushue	75%	Pat Simmons	79%
Total	81%	Total	83%

=== Bronze medal game ===
Sunday, March 8, 9:30 am

Team	1	2	3	4	5	6	7	8	9	10	11	Final
Newfoundland and Labrador (Gushue) 🔨	2	0	0	2	0	0	0	1	0	0	0	5
Saskatchewan (Laycock)	0	1	2	0	1	0	0	0	0	1	2	7

Player percentages
Newfoundland and Labrador		Saskatchewan	
Geoff Walker	92%	Dallan Muyres	75%
Brett Gallant	83%	Colton Flasch	78%
Mark Nichols	82%	Kirk Muyres	83%
Brad Gushue	74%	Steve Laycock	89%
Total	83%	Total	81%

=== Final ===
The 2015 Brier final was the first Brier final to start with four blanks. This game came down to the final stone of the eleventh end, where Pat Simmons had a draw to the pin for the win.

Sunday, March 8, 5:00 pm

Sheet C	1	2	3	4	5	6	7	8	9	10	11	Final
Northern Ontario (Jacobs) 🔨	0	0	0	0	2	0	0	1	0	2	0	5
Canada (Simmons)	0	0	0	0	0	0	2	0	3	0	1	6

Player percentages
Northern Ontario		Canada	
Ryan Harnden	93%	Nolan Thiessen	83%
E. J. Harnden	89%	Carter Rycroft	91%
Ryan Fry	88%	John Morris	86%
Brad Jacobs	85%	Pat Simmons	93%
Total	89%	Total	88%

== Statistics ==
=== Top 5 player percentages ===
Round Robin only

Leads	%
(Manitoba) Colin Hodgson	95
(Alberta) Ben Hebert	93
(Canada) Nolan Thiessen	91
(Newfoundland and Labrador) Geoff Walker	89
(New Brunswick) Jared Bezanson	89

Seconds	%
(Alberta) Brent Laing	91
(Canada) Carter Rycroft	90
(Manitoba) Derek Samagalski	88
(Northern Ontario) E. J. Harnden	87
(British Columbia) Tyrel Griffith	86

Thirds	%
(Northern Ontario) Ryan Fry	92
(Alberta) Marc Kennedy	91
(Manitoba) Braeden Moskowy	89
(Canada) John Morris	88
(Saskatchewan) Kirk Muyres	87

Fourths	%
(Northern Ontario) Brad Jacobs	86
(Saskatchewan) Steve Laycock	84
(Canada) Pat Simmons	84
(Newfoundland and Labrador) Brad Gushue	82
(Quebec) Jean-Michel Ménard	82

=== Perfect games ===
Player	Team	Position	Shots	Opponent
Brent Laing	Alberta	Second	18	Northern Ontario
Ryan Harnden	Northern Ontario	Lead	18	British Columbia
Ryan Fry	Northern Ontario	Third	18	Ontario
Colin Hodgson	Manitoba	Lead	16	Northern Ontario

== Awards ==
The awards and all-star teams are listed as follows:

All-Star Teams

First Team

- Skip: Brad Jacobs, Northern Ontario
- Third: Ryan Fry, Northern Ontario
- Second: Carter Rycroft, Team Canada
- Lead: Colin Hodgson, Manitoba

Second Team

- Skip: Brad Gushue, Newfoundland and Labrador
- Third: Marc Kennedy, Alberta
- Second: Brent Laing, Alberta
- Lead: Ben Hebert, Alberta

Ross Harstone Sportsmanship Award

- Jim Cotter, British Columbia skip

Paul McLean Award

- Jim Young, longtime camera man for TSN's curling broadcasts

Hec Gervais Most Valuable Player Award

- Pat Simmons, Team Canada skip

== Provincial and territorial playdowns ==
- 2015 Boston Pizza Cup (Alberta)
- (British Columbia) 2015 Canadian Direct Insurance BC Men's Curling Championship
- 2015 Safeway Championship (Manitoba)
- (New Brunswick) 2015 Pepsi Tankard
- 2015 Newfoundland and Labrador Tankard
- (Northern Ontario) 2015 Travelers Men's NOCA Provincials
- 2015 Clearwater Men's Provincial Championship (Nova Scotia)
- 2015 Ontario Tankard
- (Prince Edward Island) 2015 PEI Tankard
- 2015 Quebec Men's Provincial Curling Championship
- 2015 SaskTel Tankard (Saskatchewan)
- 2015 Northwest Territories Men's Curling Championship
- 2015 Yukon Men's Curling Championship
