= Marc LeCocq =

Canadian curler

- Curler
- Born: January 15, 1966 (age 60); Campbellton, New Brunswick

Team
- Curling club: Curl Moncton; Moncton, NB
- Skip: Terry Odishaw
- Third: Jordan Pinder
- Second: Marc LeCocq
- Lead: Grant Odishaw
- Alternate: Jamie Brannen

Curling career
- Brier: 8 (1993, 1996, 2002, 2003, 2004, 2016, 2017, 2019)
- Top CTRS ranking: 52nd (2016–17)
Medal record
Men's curling
Representing New Brunswick
Nokia Brier
Bronze medal – third place	2002 Calgary

Marc LeCocq (born January 15, 1966, in Campbellton, New Brunswick) is a Canadian curler from Riverview, New Brunswick. He currently throws second stones for the Mike Kennedy rink.

== Curling career ==
LeCocq made his Brier debut at the 1993 Labatt Brier, throwing second stones for Kennedy. Representing New Brunswick, the team finished the Brier with a 5–6 round robin record. LeCocq made it to the Brier again in 1996, again playing second for Kennedy. At the 1996 Labatt Brier, the team again finished with a 5–6 record.

Before returning to the Brier again, LeCocq won two provincial mixed titles, playing second for his brother Vance in 1998 and 1999. The team went 4–7 at the 1998 Canadian Mixed Curling Championship and 2-9 at the 1999 Canadian Mixed Curling Championship.

LeCocq joined the Russ Howard rink in 2001, playing second for the future Olympic champion skip. The team made it to the 2002 Nokia Brier, with Howard leading the team all the way to the semifinals, where they lost to Ontario's John Morris rink. The team would play in the next two Briers, finishing 4th at the 2003 Nokia Brier (LeCocq would go on to win the Ford Hot Shots that year), and 5th at the 2004 Nokia Brier. LeCocq would play one more season with the Howard rink, as the team's lead, playing in two Grand Slam events in the 2004-05 season, before leaving the team.

After leaving the Howard rink in 2005, LeCocq played for a number of teams, including for Kennedy again, Jim Sullivan, Andy McCann, and as a skip himself for two seasons. He re-joined the Kennedy rink in 2015. The team went on to win the 2016 New Brunswick championship, and represented New Brunswick at the 2016 Tim Hortons Brier.

== Personal life ==
LeCocq works as an air traffic controller with Nav Canada. He is married and has two children.
