= Jason Roach (curler) =

Canadian curler (born 1984)

- Curler
- Born: July 11, 1984 (age 42); Saint John, New Brunswick

Team
- Curling club: Thistle-St. Andrews CC, Saint John, NB
- Skip: Jason Roach
- Third: Darren Roach
- Second: Spencer Mawhinney
- Lead: Jared Bezanson

Curling career
- Member Association: New Brunswick
- Brier: 2 (2013, 2014)
- Top CTRS ranking: 20th (2013–14)

Jason Roach (born July 11, 1984, in Saint John, New Brunswick) is a Canadian curler.

Roach twice (2004 and 2005) won the New Brunswick men's junior championships playing third on a team skipped by Ryan Sherrard. The team won the Canadian Junior Curling Championships in their first attempt in 2004. They had finished the round-robin with a 9–3 record, in a three-way tie for first. The team would go on to win both of their playoff games, including the final against Manitoba's Daley Peters. The team then represented Canada at the 2004 World Junior Curling Championships. The team finished the round-robin with a 5–4 record, tied with Korea. However, they lost in the tie-breaker match against the Koreans. At the 2005 Canadian Junior Curling Championships they could not repeat their title, finishing with a 5–7 record.

After juniors, Roach would go on to play for a number of different teams. He joined up with Grattan in 2012. Roach has played just two seasons on the World Curling Tour. His first season was 2008-09 playing second for Jim Sullivan where they played in two events, the Diversified Transportation Canada Cup Qualifier and the Challenge Casino de Charlevoix. His second WCT season was with Grattan where they played in the 2012 Curling Masters Champéry.

Roach made his first Brier appearance when the Grattan rink won the 2013 Molson Canadian Men's Provincial Curling Championship, qualifying the team to represent New Brunswick at the 2013 Tim Hortons Brier. His brother, Darren Roach plays second for the team and was also a teammate on his Canadian junior championship team.
