= Darren Roach =

Canadian curler (born 1986)

- Curler
- Born: December 29, 1986 (age 39); Saint John, New Brunswick

Team
- Curling club: Thistle-St. Andrews CC, Saint John, NB
- Skip: Jason Roach
- Third: Darren Roach
- Second: Spencer Mawhinney
- Lead: Jared Bezanson

Curling career
- Member Association: New Brunswick
- Brier: 2 (2013, 2014)
- Top CTRS ranking: 20th (2013–14)

Darren Roach (born December 29, 1986, in Saint John, New Brunswick) is a Canadian curler. He currently throws third stones for the Jason Roach rink from Saint John, New Brunswick.

Roach twice (2004 and 2005) won the New Brunswick men's junior championships playing second on a team skipped by Ryan Sherrard. The team won the Canadian Junior Curling Championships in their first attempt in 2004. They had finished the round robin with a 9–3 record, in a three way tie for first. The team would go on to win both of their playoff games, including the final against Manitoba's Daley Peters. The team then represented Canada at the 2004 World Junior Curling Championships. The team finished the round robin with a 5–4 record, tied with Korea. However, they lost in the tie-breaker match against the Koreans. At the 2005 Canadian Junior Curling Championships they could not repeat their title, finishing with a 5–7 record.

After juniors, Roach would go on to play for a number of different teams. He joined up with Grattan in 2012. He played in his first and only World Curling Tour event with the Grattan team when they played in the 2012 Curling Masters Champéry. They finished 3–2 in pool play at the event, and did not make the playoffs. In 2013 Roach competed in his second Champery Masters this time going 8–0 with team Grattan and taking the title for his first WCT/CCT win.

Roach made his first Brier appearance when the Grattan rink won the 2013 Molson Canadian Men's Provincial Curling Championship, qualifying the team to represent New Brunswick at the 2013 Tim Hortons Brier. His brother, Jason plays third for the team and was also a teammate on his Canadian junior championship team.
