= Terry Odishaw =

Canadian curler (born 1966)

- Curler
- Born: June 17, 1966 (age 60); Saskatoon, Saskatchewan, Canada

Team
- Curling club: Curl Moncton, Moncton, NB
- Skip: Terry Odishaw
- Third: Jordan Pinder
- Second: Marc LeCocq
- Lead: Grant Odishaw
- Alternate: Jamie Brannen

Curling career
- Brier: 6 (1991, 1998, 2000, 2002, 2012, 2019)

Terrance "Terry" Odishaw (born June 17, 1966) is a Canadian curler from Moncton, New Brunswick. He is a four-time provincial men's champion and former Canadian mixed champion.

== Career ==
Odishaw has won the New Brunswick men's curling championship on four occasions. His first title came in 1991, playing third for Gary Mitchell. At the 1991 Labatt Brier, the rink went 4-7, out of the playoffs.

Odishaw won his second provincial title in 1998, this time as a skip. At the 1998 Labatt Brier, his rink went 4-7 once again, missing playoffs.

In 2007, Odishaw skipped New Brunswick to a Canadian Mixed Curling Championship, when he defeated Quebec's Ève Bélisle in the final, 6-4.

Except for being an alternate in 2000 and in 2002, Odishaw would not return to the Brier until 2012, when he won that year's New Brunswick Tankard. At the 2012 Brier, Odishaw led Team New Brunswick to a 5-6 record, missing the playoffs.

Odishaw won his fourth provincial tankard in 2019. Skipping Team New Brunswick at the 2019 Tim Hortons Brier, Odishaw led his team to a 3-4 record, failing to advance to the championship pool.

Odishaw has won four provincial mixed titles. His first was in 1986, playing second for his brother, Grant, and in 2004, 2005 & 2006, all as skip.

== Personal life ==
Odishaw has two children. He works as a realtor for Re/Max Avante.
