= Grant Odishaw =

Canadian curler (born 1964)

- Curler
- Born: July 21, 1964 (age 62); Vancouver, British Columbia

Team
- Curling club: Curl Moncton, Moncton, NB
- Skip: Terry Odishaw
- Third: Jordan Pinder
- Second: Marc LeCocq
- Lead: Grant Odishaw
- Alternate: Jamie Brannen

Curling career
- Brier: 9 (1991, 1996, 1999, 2000, 2002, 2003, 2004, 2012, 2019)
Medal record
Men's curling
Representing New Brunswick
Tim Hortons Brier
Silver medal – second place	2000 Saskatoon
Bronze medal – third place	2002 Calgary

Grant Odishaw (born July 21, 1964) is a Canadian curler from Moncton, New Brunswick. He is a nine time provincial men's champion and former Canadian Mixed champion. He currently throws lead rocks for his brother Terry's team.

== Career ==
=== Mixed ===
Odishaw is a veteran of New Brunswick curling circles. He won his first of ten mixed provincial titles in 1986, when he and his team of Anne-Marie Vautour, brother Terry and Denise Lavigne defeated Gary Mitchell in the New Brunswick final. At the Canadian Mixed Curling Championship that year, he led his team to a 5–6 record, missing the playoffs.

He won another mixed title in 1989, with a new team of Nancy Reid, Rick Perron and Lynn MacKenzie, defeating Bruce Forster in the provincial final. At the 1989 Canadian Mixed, he led the team to a 7–4 record, before losing in a tiebreaker match. He won a third mixed title in 1991 with Denise Bowser (Lavigne) rejoining the team at third, beating Mike Flannery for the provincial championship. The rink made it to the finals of the Canadian Mixed, where they lost to Manitoba, skipped by Jeff Stoughton.

Odishaw then went on to win five straight provincial mixed titles from 1993 to 1996, winning the 1994 Canadian Mixed Curling Championship along the way. He began the streak by winning the 1993 provincial championships, when he, Heather Smith, Perron and Heather's sister Krista beat Ken Smith in the New Brunswick final. At the 1993 Canadian Mixed Curling Championship, he led the team to a 5–6 record. The foursome won the 1994 provincial title beating Jean Guy Boudreau in the final. The team went on to win the Canadian Championship, defeating British Columbia, skipped by Eric Wiltzen in the final. The rink won their third straight provincial title in December 1994, defeating Barry Lewis in the final. At the 1995 Canadian Mixed Curling Championship, they missed the playoffs, going 7–6 in round robin play. The team won their fourth straight provincial title the same season, in March 1995, defeating Darryl Nowlan in the final. The team had to wait until January 1996 to represent their province at the 1996 Canadian Mixed Curling Championship, where they finished with a 5–6 record. A few months later, Odishaw won the provincial mixed title again, this time with Denise Bowser throwing third, and Perron's wife Leanne at lead. The rink beat Wade Blanchard for the New Brunswick championship. At the 1997 Canadian Mixed Curling Championship, the team went 6–5.

After over 20 years away from mixed curling, Odishaw would not win another provincial mixed titles until 2019, when he and his rink of Sylvie Robichaud, Marc LeCocq and Jane Boyle beat Ed Cyr in the New Brunswick final. The team represented the province at the 2020 Canadian Mixed Curling Championship (played in November 2019), where they made it to the final before losing to Quebec's Jean-Sébastien Roy rink.

Odishaw won another provincial mixed title in 2022 with teammates Shaelyn Park, Samuel Forestell and Krista Flanagan, defeating Charlie Sullivan in the final. At the 2022 Canadian Mixed Curling Championship, the team went 5–5.

=== Men's ===
Odishaw has won nine provincial men's championships in his career. The first was in 1991, where he played third for Gary Mitchell, defeating Mitchell's former third Brian Dobson in the Labatt Tankard final. The rink then went 4–7, missing the playoffs at the 1991 Labatt Brier.

Odishaw won his second provincial title in 1996 as the third for Mike Kennedy, when the team beat Saskatchewan-transplant Mark Dacey twice in the double knockout New Brunswick championship final. The rink then went 5–6 at the 1996 Labatt Brier.

When two-time World Champion Russ Howard moved to Moncton in 1998, Odishaw was asked to join him on a five-player rotation with the goal of winning that season's provincial championship. The team did win provincial title in 1999, Odishaw's third of his career, defeating Wade Blanchard in the final. It wasn't quite the cakewalk expected for a former World champion, as the team did lose a few games, going 29–3 during playdown play, and barely beat Blanchard 6–5 for the Tankard. At the Brier in 1999, with Odishaw throwing lead rocks, they made the playoffs, but lost to Saskatchewan's Gerald Shymko rink in the 3 vs. 4 game.

It was with Howard that Odishaw had his most success. The team won another provincial title in 2000, defeating Jim Sullivan in the New Brunswick final. At the 2000 Labatt Brier, they lost in the final to British Columbia's Greg McAulay. Odishaw was a member of the Howard rink at the 2001 Canadian Olympic Curling Trials, which finished in 4th.

The Howard won another provincial title in 2002, defeating Mike Kennedy to win the Tankard. They finished in third place at the 2002 Nokia Brier, after losing to Ontario's John Morris rink. They repeated as provincial champions in 2003, defeating Odishaw's brother Terry in the New Brunswick final, capping off a second straight unbeaten Tankard run. The team would go on to finish in 4th at the 2003 Nokia Brier, after losing to Mark Dacey, now representing Nova Scotia, in the 3 vs. 4 game. The team won a third straight provincial title in 2004, once again going undefeated and beat Terry Odishaw in the final. This time, at the 2004 Nokia Brier, the rink missed the playoffs after losing in a tiebreaker game to British Columbia's Jay Peachey.

After a 10 year partnership with Odishaw, Howard formed a new team in 2008.

Odishaw would not win another provincial title until 2012, playing lead on his brother Terry's rink. At the 2012 Molson Canadian Men's Provincial Curling Championship, the team defeated James Grattan in the final. The team would go on to finish with a 5–6 record at the 2012 Tim Hortons Brier. The team won another provincial title in 2019, beating Grattan again for the championship. They then went on to a 3–4 record at the 2019 Tim Hortons Brier.

=== Seniors ===
Odishaw has also won seven New New Brunswick Senior Championships (2016, 2017, 2018, 2021, 2022, 2023 and 2024), winning a bronze medal at the 2017 Canadian Senior Curling Championships, and a bronze medal at the 2018 Canadian Senior Curling Championships.

== Personal life ==
Odishaw is married and has two children. He is employed as a letter carrier for Canada Post.

Odishaw attended Harrison Trimble High School in Moncton, where he won a provincial mixed title in 1981.
