= Jared Bezanson =

Canadian curler

- Curler
- Born: May 11, 1986 (age 40); Kentville, Nova Scotia

Team
- Curling club: Thistle-St. Andrews CC, Saint John, NB

Curling career
- Member Association: New Brunswick
- Brier: 2 (2015, 2023)
- Top CTRS ranking: 73rd (2012–13)
Medal record
Men's curling
Representing New Brunswick
Canada Winter Games
Silver medal – second place	2003 Bathurst

Jared Bezanson (born May 11, 1986 in Kentville, Nova Scotia) is a Canadian curler from Quispamsis, New Brunswick.

As a junior curler, Bezanson won a silver medal at the 2003 Canada Winter Games. He won three straight New Brunswick junior titles from 2003 to 2005, throwing lead rocks for Daniel Sherrard (2003) and for Ryan Sherrard (2004 and 2005). At the 2003 Canadian Junior Curling Championships, the team finished the round robin with a 6-6 record. The team went on to win the gold medal at the 2004 Canadian Junior Curling Championships. They represented Canada at the 2004 World Junior Curling Championships, finishing in 5th place. Despite having the same lineup at the 2005 Canadian Junior Curling Championships, the Sherrard rink finished with a 5-7 record.

In 2009, Bezanson won the New Brunswick mixed championship, throwing lead rocks for Mary Jane McGuire. The team represented New Brunswick at the 2010 Canadian Mixed Curling Championship later that year. They would finish with a 4-7 record.

Bezanson won his first New Brunswick men's championship in 2015, playing lead for Jeremy Mallais. The team would go on to represent New Brunswick at the 2015 Tim Hortons Brier.

== Personal life ==
Bezanson is married and has one daughter. He is employed as an operations manager for Doiron Sports Excellence.
