= 2024 New Brunswick Tankard =

- Host city: Miramichi, New Brunswick
- Arena: Miramichi Curling Club
- Dates: January 31 – February 3
- Winner: Team Grattan
- Curling club: Gage G&CC, Oromocto
- Skip: James Grattan
- Third: Joel Krats
- Second: Paul Dobson
- Lead: Andy McCann
- Alternate: Drew Grattan
- Coach: Dean Grattan
- Finalist: Rene Comeau

The 2024 New Brunswick Tankard, the provincial men's curling championship for New Brunswick, was held from January 31 to February 3 at the Miramichi Curling Club in Miramichi, New Brunswick. The winning James Grattan rink represented New Brunswick at the 2024 Montana's Brier in Regina, Saskatchewan.

After returning to a round robin the previous year, the event format reverted back to a triple knockout that was used in 2022.

== Teams ==
The teams are listed as follows:

Skip	Third	Second	Lead	Alternate	Coach	Club
Rene Comeau	Alex Robichaud	Trevor Crouse	Alex Kyle	Chris Wagner		Capital WC, Fredericton
Zach Eldridge	Jack Smeltzer	Chris Jeffrey	Michael Donovan			Capital WC, Fredericton
James Grattan	Joel Krats	Paul Dobson	Andy McCann	Drew Grattan	Dean Grattan	Gage G&CC, Oromocto
Brody Hanson	Matt Stanley	Sam Forestell	Matt Magee			Curl Moncton, Moncton
Trevor Hanson	Adam MacDonald	Scott Archibald	Matt Munro	Shannon Fenelon		Woodstock G&CC, Woodstock
Scott Jones	Brian King	Scott Weagle	Jared Bezanson	Jeremy Mallais		Curl Moncton, Moncton
Grant Odishaw	Marc LeCocq	Vance LeCocq	Daryell Nowlan			Curl Moncton, Moncton
Jason Roach	Darren Roach	Spencer Mawhinney	Josh Vaughan			Thistle St. Andrews CC, Saint John
Carter Small	Alexander Gallant	Adam Tracy	Mitchell Small			Capital WC, Fredericton
Aaron Young	Daniel Lister	Kelly Harris	Joel Graham			Woodstock G&CC, Woodstock

== Knockout brackets ==
=== A Event ===
First Knockout	Qualifier 1
James Grattan	6
Grant Odishaw	6	Grant Odishaw	5
Trevor Hanson	4	James Grattan	8
Rene Comeau	5
Rene Comeau	10
Carter Small	7
James Grattan	6
Jason Roach	2
Scott Jones	6
Jason Roach	11	Jason Roach	8
Aaron Young	5	Jason Roach	6
Zach Eldridge	5
Zach Eldridge	6
Brody Hanson	4

=== B Event ===
Second Knockout	Qualifier 2
Jason Roach	6
Rene Comeau	9	Rene Comeau	8
Scott Jones	11	Scott Jones	3	Rene Comeau	6
Trevor Hanson	7	Brody Hanson	4	James Grattan	9
Brody Hanson	8	James Grattan	8
Zach Eldridge	2	Grant Odishaw	5
Grant Odishaw	9	Grant Odishaw	8
Aaron Young	4	Carter Small	3
Carter Small	10

=== C Event ===
Third Knockout	Qualifier 3
Rene Comeau	8
Grant Odishaw	4	Scott Jones	7
Scott Jones	6	Scott Jones	8	Rene Comeau	3
Trevor Hanson	3	Carter Small	5	James Grattan	10
Carter Small	11	James Grattan	7
Jason Roach	7	Jason Roach	4
Zach Eldridge	9	Zach Eldridge	4
Aaron Young	5	Brody Hanson	5
Brody Hanson	8

== Knockout results ==
All draw times listed in Atlantic Time (UTC−04:00).

=== Draw 1 ===
Wednesday, January 31, 2:00 pm

Sheet 2	1	2	3	4	5	6	7	8	9	10	Final
Grant Odishaw 🔨	1	0	1	1	0	0	0	0	1	2	6
Trevor Hanson	0	1	0	0	1	1	0	1	0	0	4

Sheet 3	1	2	3	4	5	6	7	8	9	10	Final
Jason Roach 🔨	3	0	3	0	2	0	0	3	X	X	11
Aaron Young	0	1	0	2	0	0	2	0	X	X	5

Sheet 4	1	2	3	4	5	6	7	8	9	10	Final
Rene Comeau 🔨	2	0	4	0	1	0	1	0	2	X	10
Carter Small	0	2	0	3	0	1	0	1	0	X	7

Sheet 5	1	2	3	4	5	6	7	8	9	10	Final
Zach Eldridge	1	0	1	0	2	0	0	0	1	1	6
Brody Hanson 🔨	0	1	0	1	0	0	0	2	0	0	4

=== Draw 2 ===
Wednesday, January 31, 7:30 pm

Sheet 2	1	2	3	4	5	6	7	8	9	10	Final
Aaron Young 🔨	0	0	1	0	2	0	1	0	X	X	4
Carter Small	1	2	0	2	0	3	0	2	X	X	10

Sheet 3	1	2	3	4	5	6	7	8	9	10	Final
Trevor Hanson	0	3	0	0	1	1	0	0	2	0	7
Brody Hanson 🔨	1	0	0	2	0	0	3	1	0	1	8

Sheet 4	1	2	3	4	5	6	7	8	9	10	Final
James Grattan 🔨	1	0	0	2	0	1	1	0	1	0	6
Grant Odishaw	0	2	0	0	1	0	0	1	0	1	5

Sheet 5	1	2	3	4	5	6	7	8	9	10	Final
Scott Jones 🔨	1	0	0	1	0	2	0	2	0	0	6
Jason Roach	0	2	2	0	1	0	2	0	0	1	8

=== Draw 3 ===
Thursday, February 1, 9:30 am

Sheet 2	1	2	3	4	5	6	7	8	9	10	Final
Scott Jones 🔨	2	0	2	1	0	3	3	X	X	X	11
Brody Hanson	0	3	0	0	1	0	0	X	X	X	4

Sheet 3	1	2	3	4	5	6	7	8	9	10	Final
Grant Odishaw 🔨	1	0	2	0	2	0	3	1	X	X	9
Carter Small	0	1	0	1	0	1	0	0	X	X	3

Sheet 4	1	2	3	4	5	6	7	8	9	10	Final
Jason Roach	0	0	1	1	0	1	0	1	1	1	6
Zach Eldridge 🔨	1	0	0	0	3	0	1	0	0	0	5

Sheet 5	1	2	3	4	5	6	7	8	9	10	Final
James Grattan 🔨	2	0	0	2	1	0	2	1	0	X	8
Rene Comeau	0	1	2	0	0	1	0	0	1	X	5

=== Draw 4 ===
Thursday, February 1, 2:30 pm

Sheet 3	1	2	3	4	5	6	7	8	9	10	Final
James Grattan 🔨	0	1	0	0	2	0	0	0	3	X	6
Jason Roach	0	0	0	1	0	0	0	1	0	X	2

Sheet 4	1	2	3	4	5	6	7	8	9	10	Final
Rene Comeau 🔨	2	1	0	5	0	1	X	X	X	X	9
Scott Jones	0	0	2	0	1	0	X	X	X	X	3

Sheet 5	1	2	3	4	5	6	7	8	9	10	Final
Zach Eldridge	0	0	1	0	1	0	0	X	X	X	2
Grant Odishaw 🔨	0	3	0	3	0	1	1	X	X	X	8

=== Draw 5 ===
Thursday, February 1, 7:30 pm

Sheet 2	1	2	3	4	5	6	7	8	9	10	Final
Trevor Hanson	0	0	0	2	0	1	X	X	X	X	3
Carter Small 🔨	2	1	2	0	6	0	X	X	X	X	11

Sheet 3	1	2	3	4	5	6	7	8	9	10	Final
Aaron Young	1	1	2	0	0	0	1	0	0	0	5
Brody Hanson 🔨	0	0	0	1	1	2	0	2	1	1	8

=== Draw 6 ===
Friday, February 2, 4:45 pm

Sheet 2	1	2	3	4	5	6	7	8	9	10	Final
James Grattan 🔨	0	1	0	1	1	0	2	0	2	1	8
Grant Odishaw	2	0	1	0	0	1	0	1	0	0	5

Sheet 3	1	2	3	4	5	6	7	8	9	10	Final
Scott Jones	1	2	0	0	1	1	0	1	0	0	6
Carter Small 🔨	0	0	1	1	0	0	1	0	1	1	5

Sheet 4	1	2	3	4	5	6	7	8	9	10	Final
Zach Eldridge 🔨	1	0	3	0	1	1	2	0	1	X	9
Brody Hanson	0	1	0	1	0	0	0	3	0	X	5

Sheet 5	1	2	3	4	5	6	7	8	9	10	Final
Jason Roach	0	1	0	2	1	0	2	0	0	0	6
Rene Comeau 🔨	1	0	1	0	0	2	0	2	0	2	8

=== Draw 7 ===
Saturday, February 3, 9:30 am

Sheet 2	1	2	3	4	5	6	7	8	9	10	Final
Jason Roach 🔨	3	0	0	1	1	0	0	1	1	X	7
Zach Eldridge	0	1	1	0	0	1	1	0	0	X	4

Sheet 3	1	2	3	4	5	6	7	8	9	10	Final
Rene Comeau 🔨	0	2	1	0	0	1	0	0	2	0	6
James Grattan	0	0	0	4	1	0	0	2	0	2	9

Sheet 4	1	2	3	4	5	6	7	8	9	10	Final
Grant Odishaw	0	1	0	0	0	1	0	2	0	0	4
Scott Jones 🔨	2	0	1	0	1	0	3	0	0	1	8

=== Draw 8 ===
Saturday, February 3, 2:30 pm

Sheet 2	1	2	3	4	5	6	7	8	9	10	Final
Rene Comeau 🔨	1	0	2	3	0	0	0	1	0	1	8
Scott Jones	0	1	0	0	2	1	1	0	2	0	7

Sheet 4	1	2	3	4	5	6	7	8	9	10	Final
James Grattan	0	1	1	0	0	2	2	1	0	X	7
Jason Roach 🔨	1	0	0	1	1	0	0	0	1	X	4

=== Draw 9 ===
Saturday, February 3, 7:30 pm

Sheet 3	1	2	3	4	5	6	7	8	9	10	Final
Rene Comeau 🔨	0	0	0	0	2	1	0	X	X	X	3
James Grattan	0	3	2	2	0	0	3	X	X	X	10

== Playoffs ==
No playoff was needed as Team Grattan won all three events.

Semifinal		Final
		A	James Grattan
B	James Grattan
C	James Grattan

2024 New Brunswick Tankard

James Grattan
15th New Brunswick Provincial Championship title
