= 2016 Canadian Junior Curling Championships – Men's tournament =

2016 Canadian Junior Curling Championships Men's tournament
- Host city: Stratford, Ontario
- Arena: Stratford Rotary Complex
- Dates: January 23–31
- Men's winner: Manitoba
- Curling club: Granite CC, Winnipeg
- Skip: Matt Dunstone
- Third: Colton Lott
- Second: Kyle Doering
- Lead: Rob Gordon
- Finalist: Northern Ontario (Tanner Horgan)

The men's tournament of the 2016 M&M Meat Shops Canadian Junior Curling Championships were held from January 23 to 31 at the Stratford Rotary Complex.

== Teams ==
The teams are listed as follows:

| Province | Skip | Third | Second | Lead | Club(s) |
|---|---|---|---|---|---|
| Alberta | Karsten Sturmay | Tristan Steinke | Chris Kennedy | Caleb Boorse | Saville SC, Edmonton |
| British Columbia | Tyler Tardi | Daniel Wenzek | Jordan Tardi | Nick Meister | Langley CC, Langley; Royal City CC, New Westminster |
| Manitoba | Matt Dunstone | Colton Lott | Kyle Doering | Rob Gordon | Granite CC, Winnipeg |
| New Brunswick | Alex Robichaud | Ian McKinley | Donovan Lanteigne | Peter Robichaud | Curl Moncton, Moncton |
| Newfoundland and Labrador | Greg Smith | Ryan McNeil Lamswood | Kyle Barron | Craig Laing | Caribou CC, Stephenville |
| Northwest Territories | Matthew Miller | Randy Hiebert | Logan Gagnier | Deklan Crocker | Inuvik CC, Inuvik |
| Northern Ontario | Tanner Horgan | Jacob Horgan | Nicholas Bissonnette | Maxime Blais | Copper Cliff CC, Copper Cliff |
| Nova Scotia | Matthew Manuel | Nick Zachernuk | Ryan Abraham | Alec Cameron | Mayflower CC, Halifax |
| Nunavut | Arthur Siksik | Tyson Komaksiutiksak | Javen Komaksiutiksak | Ryan Aggark | Qavik CC, Rankin Inlet |
| Ontario | Doug Kee | Jason Camm | Matthew Hall | Curtis Easter | Navan CC, Navan |
| Prince Edward Island | Matthew MacLean | Alan MacLean | Noah O'Connor | Jordan MacLean | Maple Leaf CC, O'Leary; Cornwall CC, Cornwall |
| Saskatchewan | Jacob Hersikorn | Brady Kendel | Andy Neufeld | Nicklas Neufeld | Sutherland CC, Saskatoon |
| Quebec | Félix Asselin | Nick Den Hartog | Maxence Martel | Émile Asselin | CC Glenmore, Dollard-des-Ormeaux |
| Yukon | Brayden Klassen | Spencer Wallace | Trygg Jensen | William Klassen | Whitehorse CC, Whitehorse |

== Round-robin standings ==
Final round-robin standings

Key
| Teams to Championship Pool |
| Teams to Tie-Breakers |

| Pool A | Skip | W | L |
|---|---|---|---|
| Manitoba | Matt Dunstone | 6 | 0 |
| Quebec | Félix Asselin | 4 | 2 |
| Ontario | Doug Kee | 4 | 2 |
| Alberta | Karsten Sturmay | 3 | 3 |
| Nova Scotia | Matthew Manuel | 2 | 4 |
| Newfoundland and Labrador | Greg Smith | 2 | 4 |
| Nunavut | Arthur Siksik | 0 | 6 |

| Pool B | Skip | W | L |
|---|---|---|---|
| British Columbia | Tyler Tardi | 6 | 0 |
| Northern Ontario | Tanner Horgan | 5 | 1 |
| New Brunswick | Alex Robichaud | 4 | 2 |
| Saskatchewan | Jacob Hersikorn | 3 | 3 |
| Prince Edward Island | Matthew MacLean | 2 | 4 |
| Northwest Territories | Matthew Miller | 1 | 5 |
| Yukon | Brayden Klassen | 0 | 6 |

== Round-robin results ==
All draw times are listed in Eastern Standard Time (UTC−5:00).

=== Pool A ===
==== Draw 1 ====
Saturday, January 23, 13:30

| Sheet C | 1 | 2 | 3 | 4 | 5 | 6 | 7 | 8 | 9 | 10 | Final |
|---|---|---|---|---|---|---|---|---|---|---|---|
| Manitoba (Dunstone) | 6 | 4 | 4 | 5 | 0 | 6 | 3 | 5 | X | X | 33 |
| Nunavut (Siksik) | 0 | 0 | 0 | 0 | 1 | 0 | 0 | 0 | X | X | 1 |

| Sheet G | 1 | 2 | 3 | 4 | 5 | 6 | 7 | 8 | 9 | 10 | Final |
|---|---|---|---|---|---|---|---|---|---|---|---|
| Ontario (Kee) | 2 | 0 | 0 | 2 | 0 | 5 | 0 | 1 | X | X | 10 |
| Alberta (Sturmay) | 0 | 1 | 0 | 0 | 2 | 0 | 1 | 0 | X | X | 4 |

==== Draw 2 ====
Saturday, January 24, 18:30

| Sheet B | 1 | 2 | 3 | 4 | 5 | 6 | 7 | 8 | 9 | 10 | Final |
|---|---|---|---|---|---|---|---|---|---|---|---|
| Quebec (Asselin) | 1 | 0 | 2 | 0 | 3 | 0 | 2 | 1 | 0 | X | 9 |
| Nova Scotia (Manuel) | 0 | 0 | 0 | 2 | 0 | 3 | 0 | 0 | 1 | X | 6 |

| Sheet F | 1 | 2 | 3 | 4 | 5 | 6 | 7 | 8 | 9 | 10 | Final |
|---|---|---|---|---|---|---|---|---|---|---|---|
| Nunavut (Siksik) | 0 | 1 | 0 | 1 | 0 | 0 | 0 | 0 | X | X | 2 |
| Ontario (Kee) | 2 | 0 | 1 | 0 | 4 | 2 | 0 | 1 | X | X | 10 |

| Sheet I | 1 | 2 | 3 | 4 | 5 | 6 | 7 | 8 | 9 | 10 | Final |
|---|---|---|---|---|---|---|---|---|---|---|---|
| Alberta (Sturmay) | 0 | 1 | 2 | 0 | 2 | 0 | 4 | 0 | X | X | 9 |
| Newfoundland and Labrador (Smith) | 1 | 0 | 0 | 1 | 0 | 1 | 0 | 1 | X | X | 4 |

==== Draw 3 ====
Sunday, January 24, 13:30

| Sheet B | 1 | 2 | 3 | 4 | 5 | 6 | 7 | 8 | 9 | 10 | Final |
|---|---|---|---|---|---|---|---|---|---|---|---|
| Ontario (Kee) | 0 | 1 | 0 | 1 | 0 | 1 | 0 | 0 | X | X | 3 |
| Manitoba (Dunstone) | 3 | 0 | 1 | 0 | 2 | 0 | 0 | 2 | X | X | 8 |

| Sheet D | 1 | 2 | 3 | 4 | 5 | 6 | 7 | 8 | 9 | 10 | Final |
|---|---|---|---|---|---|---|---|---|---|---|---|
| Nunavut (Siksik) | 0 | 0 | 0 | 0 | 0 | 0 | 1 | 0 | X | X | 1 |
| Nova Scotia (Manuel) | 5 | 2 | 3 | 3 | 1 | 2 | 0 | 2 | X | X | 18 |

==== Draw 4 ====
Sunday, January 24, 18:30

| Sheet E | 1 | 2 | 3 | 4 | 5 | 6 | 7 | 8 | 9 | 10 | Final |
|---|---|---|---|---|---|---|---|---|---|---|---|
| Ontario (Kee) | 0 | 2 | 0 | 0 | 3 | 0 | 1 | 0 | 0 | 0 | 6 |
| Quebec (Asselin) | 1 | 0 | 1 | 2 | 0 | 1 | 0 | 1 | 1 | 2 | 7 |

| Sheet H | 1 | 2 | 3 | 4 | 5 | 6 | 7 | 8 | 9 | 10 | Final |
|---|---|---|---|---|---|---|---|---|---|---|---|
| Alberta (Sturmay) | 7 | 3 | 2 | 0 | 7 | 1 | 3 | 0 | X | X | 23 |
| Nunavut (Siksik) | 0 | 0 | 0 | 1 | 0 | 0 | 0 | 1 | X | X | 2 |

| Sheet J | 1 | 2 | 3 | 4 | 5 | 6 | 7 | 8 | 9 | 10 | Final |
|---|---|---|---|---|---|---|---|---|---|---|---|
| Newfoundland and Labrador (Smith) | 0 | 1 | 0 | 0 | 2 | 0 | 2 | 0 | 1 | X | 6 |
| Manitoba (Dunstone) | 1 | 0 | 2 | 0 | 0 | 3 | 0 | 5 | 0 | X | 11 |

==== Draw 5 ====
Monday, January 25, 9:00

| Sheet G | 1 | 2 | 3 | 4 | 5 | 6 | 7 | 8 | 9 | 10 | Final |
|---|---|---|---|---|---|---|---|---|---|---|---|
| Manitoba (Dunstone) | 0 | 2 | 0 | 0 | 3 | 1 | 0 | 1 | X | X | 7 |
| Nova Scotia (Manuel) | 0 | 0 | 1 | 0 | 0 | 0 | 1 | 0 | X | X | 2 |

==== Draw 6 ====
Monday, January 25, 13:30

| Sheet E | 1 | 2 | 3 | 4 | 5 | 6 | 7 | 8 | 9 | 10 | Final |
|---|---|---|---|---|---|---|---|---|---|---|---|
| Manitoba (Dunstone) | 0 | 2 | 0 | 1 | 1 | 0 | 2 | 1 | 2 | X | 9 |
| Alberta (Sturmay) | 1 | 0 | 2 | 0 | 0 | 1 | 0 | 0 | 0 | X | 4 |

| Sheet G | 1 | 2 | 3 | 4 | 5 | 6 | 7 | 8 | 9 | 10 | Final |
|---|---|---|---|---|---|---|---|---|---|---|---|
| Newfoundland and Labrador (Smith) | 3 | 0 | 0 | 0 | 2 | 0 | 2 | 1 | 1 | 0 | 9 |
| Quebec (Asselin) | 0 | 2 | 1 | 0 | 0 | 3 | 0 | 0 | 0 | 2 | 8 |

==== Draw 7 ====
Monday, January 25, 18:30

| Sheet A | 1 | 2 | 3 | 4 | 5 | 6 | 7 | 8 | 9 | 10 | 11 | Final |
|---|---|---|---|---|---|---|---|---|---|---|---|---|
| Nova Scotia (Manuel) | 0 | 2 | 2 | 0 | 0 | 2 | 0 | 1 | 0 | 1 | 0 | 8 |
| Alberta (Sturmay) | 1 | 0 | 0 | 2 | 3 | 0 | 0 | 0 | 2 | 0 | 1 | 9 |

| Sheet D | 1 | 2 | 3 | 4 | 5 | 6 | 7 | 8 | 9 | 10 | Final |
|---|---|---|---|---|---|---|---|---|---|---|---|
| Newfoundland and Labrador (Smith) | 0 | 1 | 0 | 0 | 0 | 1 | 0 | 0 | 1 | X | 3 |
| Ontario (Kee) | 2 | 0 | 2 | 0 | 0 | 0 | 0 | 3 | 0 | X | 7 |

| Sheet J | 1 | 2 | 3 | 4 | 5 | 6 | 7 | 8 | 9 | 10 | Final |
|---|---|---|---|---|---|---|---|---|---|---|---|
| Quebec (Asselin) | 2 | 2 | 2 | 1 | 1 | 1 | 1 | 1 | X | X | 11 |
| Nunavut (Siksik) | 0 | 0 | 0 | 0 | 0 | 0 | 0 | 0 | X | X | 0 |

==== Draw 8 ====
Tuesday, January 26, 13:30

| Sheet D | 1 | 2 | 3 | 4 | 5 | 6 | 7 | 8 | 9 | 10 | Final |
|---|---|---|---|---|---|---|---|---|---|---|---|
| Alberta (Sturmay) | 1 | 0 | 0 | 1 | 0 | 1 | 0 | 1 | 0 | 0 | 4 |
| Quebec (Asselin) | 0 | 1 | 0 | 0 | 2 | 0 | 1 | 0 | 2 | 2 | 8 |

| Sheet E | 1 | 2 | 3 | 4 | 5 | 6 | 7 | 8 | 9 | 10 | Final |
|---|---|---|---|---|---|---|---|---|---|---|---|
| Nova Scotia (Manuel) | 0 | 0 | 3 | 2 | 0 | 0 | 1 | 0 | 3 | X | 9 |
| Newfoundland and Labrador (Smith) | 0 | 0 | 0 | 0 | 1 | 1 | 0 | 1 | 0 | X | 3 |

==== Draw 9 ====
Tuesday, January 26, 18:30

| Sheet B | 1 | 2 | 3 | 4 | 5 | 6 | 7 | 8 | 9 | 10 | Final |
|---|---|---|---|---|---|---|---|---|---|---|---|
| Nunavut (Siksik) | 0 | 0 | 0 | 0 | 0 | 0 | 0 | 0 | X | X | 0 |
| Newfoundland and Labrador (Smith) | 1 | 2 | 2 | 2 | 2 | 1 | 1 | 3 | X | X | 14 |

| Sheet H | 1 | 2 | 3 | 4 | 5 | 6 | 7 | 8 | 9 | 10 | Final |
|---|---|---|---|---|---|---|---|---|---|---|---|
| Quebec (Asselin) | 0 | 0 | 2 | 0 | 0 | 0 | 1 | 0 | X | X | 3 |
| Manitoba (Dunstone) | 4 | 0 | 0 | 2 | 1 | 1 | 0 | 1 | X | X | 9 |

| Sheet J | 1 | 2 | 3 | 4 | 5 | 6 | 7 | 8 | 9 | 10 | Final |
|---|---|---|---|---|---|---|---|---|---|---|---|
| Nova Scotia (Manuel) | 1 | 0 | 1 | 0 | 0 | 1 | 0 | 0 | 1 | X | 4 |
| Ontario (Kee) | 0 | 1 | 0 | 2 | 1 | 0 | 0 | 3 | 0 | X | 7 |

=== Pool B ===
==== Draw 1 ====
Saturday, January 23, 13:30

| Sheet B | 1 | 2 | 3 | 4 | 5 | 6 | 7 | 8 | 9 | 10 | Final |
|---|---|---|---|---|---|---|---|---|---|---|---|
| Saskatchewan (Hersikorn) | 4 | 0 | 3 | 0 | 0 | 0 | 3 | 2 | X | X | 12 |
| Northwest Territories (Miller) | 0 | 1 | 0 | 1 | 1 | 1 | 0 | 0 | X | X | 4 |

| Sheet F | 1 | 2 | 3 | 4 | 5 | 6 | 7 | 8 | 9 | 10 | Final |
|---|---|---|---|---|---|---|---|---|---|---|---|
| Northern Ontario (Horgan) | 0 | 2 | 0 | 2 | 0 | 4 | 0 | 1 | 0 | X | 9 |
| Yukon (Klassen) | 2 | 0 | 1 | 0 | 1 | 0 | 1 | 0 | 0 | X | 5 |

| Sheet J | 1 | 2 | 3 | 4 | 5 | 6 | 7 | 8 | 9 | 10 | Final |
|---|---|---|---|---|---|---|---|---|---|---|---|
| Prince Edward Island (MacLean) | 1 | 1 | 0 | 0 | 1 | 0 | 0 | 1 | 0 | X | 4 |
| British Columbia (Tardi) | 0 | 0 | 3 | 1 | 0 | 2 | 0 | 0 | 3 | X | 9 |

==== Draw 2 ====
Saturday, January 23, 18:30

| Sheet C | 1 | 2 | 3 | 4 | 5 | 6 | 7 | 8 | 9 | 10 | Final |
|---|---|---|---|---|---|---|---|---|---|---|---|
| New Brunswick (Robichaud) | 0 | 1 | 0 | 0 | 0 | 0 | 1 | 0 | 1 | X | 3 |
| Northern Ontario (Horgan) | 2 | 0 | 2 | 1 | 1 | 0 | 0 | 1 | 0 | X | 7 |

| Sheet G | 1 | 2 | 3 | 4 | 5 | 6 | 7 | 8 | 9 | 10 | Final |
|---|---|---|---|---|---|---|---|---|---|---|---|
| Northwest Territories (Miller) | 1 | 0 | 0 | 0 | 0 | 0 | 2 | 1 | X | X | 4 |
| British Columbia (Tardi) | 0 | 4 | 0 | 2 | 2 | 2 | 0 | 0 | X | X | 10 |

==== Draw 3 ====
Sunday, January 24, 13:30

| Sheet E | 1 | 2 | 3 | 4 | 5 | 6 | 7 | 8 | 9 | 10 | Final |
|---|---|---|---|---|---|---|---|---|---|---|---|
| British Columbia (Tardi) | 1 | 3 | 1 | 0 | 1 | 1 | 0 | 0 | 0 | 1 | 8 |
| Saskatchewan (Hersikorn) | 0 | 0 | 0 | 2 | 0 | 0 | 1 | 2 | 1 | 0 | 6 |

| Sheet H | 1 | 2 | 3 | 4 | 5 | 6 | 7 | 8 | 9 | 10 | Final |
|---|---|---|---|---|---|---|---|---|---|---|---|
| Prince Edward Island (MacLean) | 0 | 1 | 0 | 0 | 0 | 1 | 0 | 2 | 0 | 2 | 6 |
| Northern Ontario (Horgan) | 5 | 0 | 0 | 1 | 0 | 0 | 1 | 0 | 0 | 0 | 7 |

| Sheet I | 1 | 2 | 3 | 4 | 5 | 6 | 7 | 8 | 9 | 10 | Final |
|---|---|---|---|---|---|---|---|---|---|---|---|
| Yukon (Klassen) | 0 | 1 | 0 | 2 | 0 | 1 | 1 | 0 | X | X | 5 |
| New Brunswick (Robichaud) | 3 | 0 | 4 | 0 | 1 | 0 | 0 | 3 | X | X | 11 |

==== Draw 4 ====
Sunday, January 24, 18:30

| Sheet B | 1 | 2 | 3 | 4 | 5 | 6 | 7 | 8 | 9 | 10 | Final |
|---|---|---|---|---|---|---|---|---|---|---|---|
| Northern Ontario (Horgan) | 0 | 1 | 0 | 1 | 0 | 1 | 0 | 0 | X | X | 3 |
| British Columbia (Tardi) | 0 | 0 | 2 | 0 | 4 | 0 | 2 | 0 | X | X | 8 |

| Sheet D | 1 | 2 | 3 | 4 | 5 | 6 | 7 | 8 | 9 | 10 | Final |
|---|---|---|---|---|---|---|---|---|---|---|---|
| Northwest Territories (Miller) | 0 | 1 | 0 | 1 | 0 | 2 | 0 | 0 | X | X | 4 |
| Prince Edward Island (MacLean) | 2 | 0 | 1 | 0 | 2 | 0 | 2 | 1 | 2 | X | 10 |

==== Draw 5 ====
Monday, January 25, 9:00

| Sheet I | 1 | 2 | 3 | 4 | 5 | 6 | 7 | 8 | 9 | 10 | Final |
|---|---|---|---|---|---|---|---|---|---|---|---|
| Prince Edward Island (MacLean) | 0 | 0 | 1 | 0 | 0 | 1 | 0 | 1 | X | X | 3 |
| Saskatchewan (Hersikorn) | 3 | 2 | 0 | 2 | 2 | 0 | 1 | 0 | X | X | 10 |

==== Draw 6 ====
Monday, January 25, 13:30

| Sheet A | 1 | 2 | 3 | 4 | 5 | 6 | 7 | 8 | 9 | 10 | Final |
|---|---|---|---|---|---|---|---|---|---|---|---|
| New Brunswick (Robichaud) | 0 | 1 | 0 | 0 | 0 | 0 | 2 | 0 | 4 | X | 7 |
| Prince Edward Island (MacLean) | 0 | 0 | 0 | 1 | 0 | 1 | 0 | 2 | 0 | X | 4 |

| Sheet D | 1 | 2 | 3 | 4 | 5 | 6 | 7 | 8 | 9 | 10 | Final |
|---|---|---|---|---|---|---|---|---|---|---|---|
| British Columbia (Tardi) | 3 | 0 | 1 | 2 | 2 | 0 | 2 | 0 | X | X | 10 |
| Yukon (Klassen) | 0 | 1 | 0 | 0 | 0 | 1 | 0 | 0 | X | X | 2 |

| Sheet I | 1 | 2 | 3 | 4 | 5 | 6 | 7 | 8 | 9 | 10 | Final |
|---|---|---|---|---|---|---|---|---|---|---|---|
| Northern Ontario (Horgan) | 1 | 2 | 0 | 2 | 2 | 4 | 0 | 2 | X | X | 13 |
| Northwest Territories (Miller) | 0 | 0 | 1 | 0 | 0 | 0 | 2 | 0 | X | X | 3 |

==== Draw 7 ====
Monday, January 25, 18:30

| Sheet F | 1 | 2 | 3 | 4 | 5 | 6 | 7 | 8 | 9 | 10 | Final |
|---|---|---|---|---|---|---|---|---|---|---|---|
| New Brunswick (Robichaud) | 1 | 1 | 1 | 0 | 5 | 1 | 1 | 2 | X | X | 12 |
| Northwest Territories (Miller) | 0 | 0 | 0 | 1 | 0 | 0 | 0 | 0 | X | X | 1 |

| Sheet H | 1 | 2 | 3 | 4 | 5 | 6 | 7 | 8 | 9 | 10 | Final |
|---|---|---|---|---|---|---|---|---|---|---|---|
| Yukon (Klassen) | 0 | 0 | 1 | 1 | 0 | 0 | 0 | 1 | 0 | X | 3 |
| Saskatchewan (Hersikorn) | 1 | 1 | 0 | 0 | 1 | 0 | 1 | 0 | 4 | X | 8 |

==== Draw 8 ====
Tuesday, January 26, 13:30

| Sheet A | 1 | 2 | 3 | 4 | 5 | 6 | 7 | 8 | 9 | 10 | Final |
|---|---|---|---|---|---|---|---|---|---|---|---|
| Saskatchewan (Hersikorn) | 0 | 0 | 0 | 2 | 0 | 1 | 0 | 1 | 0 | X | 4 |
| Northern Ontario (Horgan) | 0 | 2 | 0 | 0 | 2 | 0 | 2 | 0 | 1 | X | 7 |

| Sheet C | 1 | 2 | 3 | 4 | 5 | 6 | 7 | 8 | 9 | 10 | Final |
|---|---|---|---|---|---|---|---|---|---|---|---|
| Northwest Territories (Miller) | 3 | 2 | 1 | 0 | 0 | 1 | 0 | 1 | 0 | X | 8 |
| Yukon (Klassen) | 0 | 0 | 0 | 1 | 1 | 0 | 1 | 0 | 1 | X | 4 |

| Sheet H | 1 | 2 | 3 | 4 | 5 | 6 | 7 | 8 | 9 | 10 | Final |
|---|---|---|---|---|---|---|---|---|---|---|---|
| British Columbia (Tardi) | 2 | 0 | 3 | 1 | 0 | 1 | 0 | 1 | X | X | 8 |
| New Brunswick (Robichaud) | 0 | 0 | 0 | 0 | 1 | 0 | 1 | 0 | X | X | 2 |

==== Draw 9 ====
Tuesday, January 26, 18:30

| Sheet D | 1 | 2 | 3 | 4 | 5 | 6 | 7 | 8 | 9 | 10 | 11 | Final |
|---|---|---|---|---|---|---|---|---|---|---|---|---|
| Saskatchewan (Hersikorn) | 0 | 1 | 0 | 2 | 0 | 1 | 0 | 0 | 1 | 1 | 0 | 6 |
| New Brunswick (Robichaud) | 1 | 0 | 1 | 0 | 2 | 0 | 1 | 1 | 0 | 0 | 4 | 10 |

| Sheet E | 1 | 2 | 3 | 4 | 5 | 6 | 7 | 8 | 9 | 10 | Final |
|---|---|---|---|---|---|---|---|---|---|---|---|
| Yukon (Klassen) | 0 | 0 | 1 | 0 | 3 | 0 | 0 | 0 | X | X | 4 |
| Prince Edward Island (MacLean) | 0 | 3 | 0 | 3 | 0 | 1 | 0 | 3 | X | X | 10 |

== Placement Round ==
=== Seeding Pool ===
==== Standings ====
After Round-robin standings

| Team | Skip | W | L |
|---|---|---|---|
| Newfoundland and Labrador | Greg Smith | 5 | 4 |
| Nova Scotia | Matthew Manuel | 5 | 4 |
| Prince Edward Island | Matthew MacLean | 3 | 6 |
| Yukon | Brayden Klassen | 1 | 8 |
| Nunavut | Arthur Siksik | 1 | 8 |
| Northwest Territories | Matthew Miller | 1 | 8 |

===== Draw 1 =====
Wednesday, January 27, 13:30

| Sheet B | 1 | 2 | 3 | 4 | 5 | 6 | 7 | 8 | 9 | 10 | Final |
|---|---|---|---|---|---|---|---|---|---|---|---|
| Northwest Territories (Miller) | 1 | 0 | 1 | 0 | 0 | 0 | 0 | 3 | 1 | X | 6 |
| Nunavut (Siksik) | 0 | 1 | 0 | 2 | 2 | 3 | 1 | 0 | 0 | X | 9 |

| Sheet I | 1 | 2 | 3 | 4 | 5 | 6 | 7 | 8 | 9 | 10 | Final |
|---|---|---|---|---|---|---|---|---|---|---|---|
| Yukon (Klassen) | 0 | 2 | 0 | 0 | 0 | 0 | 0 | 1 | X | X | 3 |
| Newfoundland and Labrador (Smith) | 1 | 0 | 3 | 2 | 2 | 1 | 0 | 0 | X | X | 9 |

===== Draw 2 =====
Wednesday, January 27, 18:30

| Sheet E | 1 | 2 | 3 | 4 | 5 | 6 | 7 | 8 | 9 | 10 | Final |
|---|---|---|---|---|---|---|---|---|---|---|---|
| Prince Edward Island (MacLean) | 0 | 4 | 1 | 3 | 2 | 0 | 0 | 1 | X | X | 11 |
| Nunavut (Siksik) | 0 | 0 | 0 | 0 | 0 | 0 | 1 | 0 | X | X | 1 |

| Sheet F | 1 | 2 | 3 | 4 | 5 | 6 | 7 | 8 | 9 | 10 | Final |
|---|---|---|---|---|---|---|---|---|---|---|---|
| Nova Scotia (Manuel) | 0 | 3 | 1 | 0 | 0 | 2 | 0 | 6 | X | X | 12 |
| Yukon (Klassen) | 3 | 0 | 0 | 0 | 2 | 0 | 1 | 0 | X | X | 6 |

===== Draw 3 =====
Thursday, January 28, 13:30

| Sheet A | 1 | 2 | 3 | 4 | 5 | 6 | 7 | 8 | 9 | 10 | Final |
|---|---|---|---|---|---|---|---|---|---|---|---|
| Newfoundland and Labrador (Smith) | 3 | 0 | 1 | 0 | 0 | 1 | 0 | 1 | 2 | 1 | 9 |
| Prince Edward Island (MacLean) | 0 | 2 | 0 | 3 | 2 | 0 | 1 | 0 | 0 | 0 | 8 |

| Sheet D | 1 | 2 | 3 | 4 | 5 | 6 | 7 | 8 | 9 | 10 | Final |
|---|---|---|---|---|---|---|---|---|---|---|---|
| Nova Scotia (Manuel) | 2 | 0 | 3 | 1 | 0 | 0 | 4 | 0 | X | X | 10 |
| Northwest Territories (Miller) | 0 | 1 | 0 | 0 | 0 | 1 | 0 | 1 | X | X | 3 |

| Sheet G | 1 | 2 | 3 | 4 | 5 | 6 | 7 | 8 | 9 | 10 | Final |
|---|---|---|---|---|---|---|---|---|---|---|---|
| Nunavut (Siksik) | 0 | 0 | 0 | 0 | 0 | 1 | 0 | 0 | X | X | 1 |
| Yukon (Klassen) | 1 | 2 | 1 | 1 | 2 | 0 | 2 | 2 | X | X | 11 |

===== Draw 4 =====
Thursday, January 28, 18:30

| Sheet E | 1 | 2 | 3 | 4 | 5 | 6 | 7 | 8 | 9 | 10 | Final |
|---|---|---|---|---|---|---|---|---|---|---|---|
| Newfoundland and Labrador (Smith) | 0 | 6 | 0 | 1 | 0 | 5 | 0 | 5 | X | X | 17 |
| Northwest Territories (Miller) | 1 | 0 | 0 | 0 | 1 | 0 | 2 | 0 | X | X | 4 |

===== Draw 5 =====
Friday, January 29, 9:00

| Sheet H | 1 | 2 | 3 | 4 | 5 | 6 | 7 | 8 | 9 | 10 | Final |
|---|---|---|---|---|---|---|---|---|---|---|---|
| Nova Scotia (Manuel) | 3 | 2 | 1 | 0 | 2 | 0 | 0 | 1 | X | X | 9 |
| Prince Edward Island (MacLean) | 0 | 0 | 0 | 1 | 0 | 0 | 1 | 0 | X | X | 2 |

=== Championship Pool ===
==== Championship Pool Standings ====
After Round-robin standings

Key
| Teams to Playoffs |

| Province | Skip | W | L |
|---|---|---|---|
| Northern Ontario | Tanner Horgan | 9 | 1 |
| Manitoba | Matt Dunstone | 9 | 1 |
| British Columbia | Tyler Tardi | 7 | 3 |
| Quebec | Félix Asselin | 6 | 4 |
| Alberta | Karsten Sturmay | 6 | 4 |
| Saskatchewan | Jacob Hersikorn | 5 | 5 |
| Ontario | Doug Kee | 5 | 5 |
| New Brunswick | Alex Robichaud | 4 | 6 |

===== Draw 1 =====
Wednesday, January 27, 13:30

| Sheet D | 1 | 2 | 3 | 4 | 5 | 6 | 7 | 8 | 9 | 10 | Final |
|---|---|---|---|---|---|---|---|---|---|---|---|
| British Columbia (Tardi) | 2 | 0 | 2 | 0 | 1 | 0 | 0 | 3 | 2 | X | 10 |
| Ontario (Kee) | 0 | 1 | 0 | 2 | 0 | 1 | 0 | 0 | 0 | X | 4 |

| Sheet F | 1 | 2 | 3 | 4 | 5 | 6 | 7 | 8 | 9 | 10 | Final |
|---|---|---|---|---|---|---|---|---|---|---|---|
| New Brunswick (Robichaud) | 0 | 0 | 1 | 1 | 0 | 1 | 0 | 0 | 0 | X | 3 |
| Manitoba (Dunstone) | 1 | 1 | 0 | 0 | 3 | 0 | 0 | 2 | 0 | X | 7 |

| Sheet G | 1 | 2 | 3 | 4 | 5 | 6 | 7 | 8 | 9 | 10 | Final |
|---|---|---|---|---|---|---|---|---|---|---|---|
| Northern Ontario (Horgan) | 3 | 0 | 0 | 2 | 0 | 2 | 0 | 0 | 1 | X | 8 |
| Alberta (Sturmay) | 0 | 1 | 1 | 0 | 2 | 0 | 2 | 0 | 0 | X | 6 |

===== Draw 2 =====
Wednesday, January 27, 18:30

| Sheet A | 1 | 2 | 3 | 4 | 5 | 6 | 7 | 8 | 9 | 10 | Final |
|---|---|---|---|---|---|---|---|---|---|---|---|
| Saskatchewan (Hersikorn) | 0 | 0 | 0 | 1 | 0 | 2 | 0 | 1 | 0 | 4 | 8 |
| Quebec (Asselin) | 0 | 0 | 0 | 0 | 1 | 0 | 2 | 0 | 2 | 0 | 5 |

| Sheet B | 1 | 2 | 3 | 4 | 5 | 6 | 7 | 8 | 9 | 10 | Final |
|---|---|---|---|---|---|---|---|---|---|---|---|
| Northern Ontario (Horgan) | 1 | 2 | 0 | 0 | 0 | 2 | 0 | 0 | 0 | 1 | 6 |
| Ontario (Kee) | 0 | 0 | 0 | 1 | 1 | 0 | 0 | 0 | 2 | 0 | 4 |

| Sheet H | 1 | 2 | 3 | 4 | 5 | 6 | 7 | 8 | 9 | 10 | Final |
|---|---|---|---|---|---|---|---|---|---|---|---|
| British Columbia (Tardi) | 0 | 0 | 1 | 0 | 1 | 1 | 0 | 0 | X | X | 3 |
| Alberta (Sturmay) | 0 | 3 | 0 | 4 | 0 | 0 | 0 | 4 | X | X | 11 |

===== Draw 3 =====
Thursday, January 28, 13:30

| Sheet E | 1 | 2 | 3 | 4 | 5 | 6 | 7 | 8 | 9 | 10 | Final |
|---|---|---|---|---|---|---|---|---|---|---|---|
| Saskatchewan (Hersikorn) | 0 | 0 | 2 | 0 | 0 | 0 | 1 | 0 | 0 | X | 3 |
| Manitoba (Dunstone) | 0 | 0 | 0 | 2 | 1 | 0 | 0 | 0 | 3 | X | 6 |

| Sheet I | 1 | 2 | 3 | 4 | 5 | 6 | 7 | 8 | 9 | 10 | Final |
|---|---|---|---|---|---|---|---|---|---|---|---|
| New Brunswick (Robichaud) | 1 | 0 | 5 | 0 | 0 | 1 | 0 | 1 | 1 | 0 | 9 |
| Quebec (Asselin) | 0 | 1 | 0 | 1 | 3 | 0 | 2 | 0 | 0 | 3 | 10 |

===== Draw 4 =====
Thursday, January 28, 18:30

| Sheet A | 1 | 2 | 3 | 4 | 5 | 6 | 7 | 8 | 9 | 10 | Final |
|---|---|---|---|---|---|---|---|---|---|---|---|
| Alberta (Sturmay) | 0 | 2 | 0 | 0 | 1 | 0 | 0 | 2 | 0 | 1 | 6 |
| New Brunswick (Robichaud) | 0 | 0 | 0 | 1 | 0 | 0 | 1 | 0 | 2 | 0 | 4 |

| Sheet C | 1 | 2 | 3 | 4 | 5 | 6 | 7 | 8 | 9 | 10 | Final |
|---|---|---|---|---|---|---|---|---|---|---|---|
| Ontario (Kee) | 0 | 0 | 0 | 1 | 0 | 0 | 0 | 0 | 0 | X | 1 |
| Saskatchewan (Hersikorn) | 0 | 0 | 0 | 0 | 0 | 0 | 0 | 2 | 3 | X | 5 |

| Sheet F | 1 | 2 | 3 | 4 | 5 | 6 | 7 | 8 | 9 | 10 | Final |
|---|---|---|---|---|---|---|---|---|---|---|---|
| Quebec (Asselin) | 1 | 3 | 0 | 0 | 3 | 0 | 0 | 1 | 1 | X | 9 |
| British Columbia (Tardi) | 0 | 0 | 3 | 1 | 0 | 1 | 0 | 0 | 0 | X | 5 |

| Sheet I | 1 | 2 | 3 | 4 | 5 | 6 | 7 | 8 | 9 | 10 | 11 | Final |
|---|---|---|---|---|---|---|---|---|---|---|---|---|
| Manitoba (Dunstone) | 1 | 0 | 0 | 0 | 2 | 0 | 0 | 1 | 0 | 1 | 0 | 5 |
| Northern Ontario (Horgan) | 0 | 1 | 1 | 1 | 0 | 1 | 0 | 0 | 1 | 0 | 2 | 7 |

===== Draw 5 =====
Friday, January 29, 9:00

| Sheet C | 1 | 2 | 3 | 4 | 5 | 6 | 7 | 8 | 9 | 10 | 11 | Final |
|---|---|---|---|---|---|---|---|---|---|---|---|---|
| Manitoba (Dunstone) | 1 | 1 | 0 | 1 | 0 | 0 | 1 | 0 | 0 | 0 | 1 | 5 |
| British Columbia (Tardi) | 0 | 0 | 1 | 0 | 1 | 0 | 0 | 0 | 0 | 2 | 0 | 4 |

| Sheet E | 1 | 2 | 3 | 4 | 5 | 6 | 7 | 8 | 9 | 10 | Final |
|---|---|---|---|---|---|---|---|---|---|---|---|
| Quebec (Asselin) | 0 | 0 | 1 | 0 | 1 | 0 | 0 | 0 | 1 | 1 | 4 |
| Northern Ontario (Horgan) | 0 | 1 | 0 | 1 | 0 | 1 | 1 | 1 | 0 | 0 | 5 |

| Sheet G | 1 | 2 | 3 | 4 | 5 | 6 | 7 | 8 | 9 | 10 | Final |
|---|---|---|---|---|---|---|---|---|---|---|---|
| Ontario (Kee) | 0 | 4 | 0 | 3 | 1 | 0 | 2 | 0 | 0 | X | 10 |
| New Brunswick (Robichaud) | 1 | 0 | 2 | 0 | 0 | 2 | 0 | 1 | 1 | X | 7 |

| Sheet J | 1 | 2 | 3 | 4 | 5 | 6 | 7 | 8 | 9 | 10 | Final |
|---|---|---|---|---|---|---|---|---|---|---|---|
| Alberta (Sturmay) | 0 | 3 | 0 | 0 | 2 | 0 | 1 | 0 | 1 | 0 | 7 |
| Saskatchewan (Hersikorn) | 0 | 0 | 0 | 1 | 0 | 1 | 0 | 3 | 0 | 1 | 6 |

== Playoffs ==
| Semifinal | | | Final |
| | | | 1 | Northern Ontario | 4 |
| 2 | Manitoba | 8 | 2 | Manitoba | 11 |
| 3 | British Columbia | 3 |

=== Semifinal ===
Saturday, January 30, 19:00

| Team | 1 | 2 | 3 | 4 | 5 | 6 | 7 | 8 | 9 | 10 | Final |
|---|---|---|---|---|---|---|---|---|---|---|---|
| Manitoba (Dunstone) | 0 | 1 | 0 | 2 | 1 | 1 | 0 | 1 | 2 | X | 8 |
| British Columbia (Tardi) | 1 | 0 | 1 | 0 | 0 | 0 | 1 | 0 | 0 | X | 3 |

Player percentages
| Manitoba | | British Columbia | |
|---|---|---|---|
| Rob Gordon | 83% | Nick Meister | 86% |
| Kyle Doering | 94% | Jordan Tardi | 81% |
| Colton Lott | 94% | Daniel Wenzek | 78% |
| Matt Dunstone | 92% | Tyler Tardi | 65% |
| Total | 91% | Total | 77% |

=== Final ===
Sunday, January 31, 15:00

| Team | 1 | 2 | 3 | 4 | 5 | 6 | 7 | 8 | 9 | 10 | Final |
|---|---|---|---|---|---|---|---|---|---|---|---|
| Northern Ontario (Horgan) | 2 | 0 | 0 | 0 | 1 | 0 | 1 | 0 | X | X | 4 |
| Manitoba (Dunstone) | 0 | 3 | 3 | 1 | 0 | 3 | 0 | 1 | X | X | 11 |

Player percentages
| Northern Ontario | | Manitoba | |
|---|---|---|---|
| Maxime Blais | 98% | Rob Gordon | 97% |
| Nicholas Bissonnette | 81% | Kyle Doering | 100% |
| Jacob Horgan | 64% | Colton Lott | 91% |
| Tanner Horgan | 70% | Matt Dunstone | 97% |
| Total | 79% | Total | 96% |

2016 Canadian Junior Men's Curling Champions
(Manitoba)
Manitoba
8th Junior Men's National Championship title
