= Rene Comeau =

Canadian curler (born 1994)

- Curler
- Born: December 14, 1994 (age 31); Fredericton, New Brunswick

Team
- Curling club: Capital Winter Club, Fredericton, NB
- Skip: Colten Steele
- Third: Rene Comeau
- Second: Alex Robichaud
- Lead: Cameron Sallaj

Curling career
- Member Association: New Brunswick
- Top CTRS ranking: 70th (2024–25)

Rene Comeau (born December 14, 1994) is a Canadian curler from Fredericton, New Brunswick. He currently plays third for team Colten Steele.

== Career ==
=== Juniors ===
Comeau won the 2014 New Brunswick Junior Curling Championship. He skipped the team of Daniel Wenzek, Jordon Craft and Ryan Freeze at the 2014 Canadian Junior Curling Championships. They finished the round robin with a 5–1 record and the championship pool with a 7–3 record, qualifying them for the semifinal. They breezed past Alberta to face Manitoba in the gold medal game. The teams were even in percentages however Manitoba had a key steal of four which was ultimately the difference in the game. New Brunswick earned the silver medal.

Comeau would win the provincial championship again in 2015 this time with a new team of Andrew Burgess, Alex MacNeil and Ryan Freeze. The team had an identical start as Comeau did in 2014, going 5–1 in the round robin but improving in the championship pool, finishing 8–2. The team would unfortunately not reach the final this year, losing to Saskatchewan 8–6 in the semifinal. The following season, Team Comeau played in the 2015 GSOC Tour Challenge Tier 2 event, where they finished 1–3.

=== Mens ===
After aging out of Juniors, Comeau would start to find success in men's play provincially in the 2021–22 season as third on team Alex Robichaud, with teammates Chris Wagner and Alex Kyle. At the 2022 New Brunswick Tankard, the team finished 2–3 in the triple knockout bracket. The following season, they slightly bettered their record with a 3–4 performance at the 2023 New Brunswick Tankard, finishing fifth. For the 2023–24 season, Comeau took over as skip with Robichaud moving to third. Trevor Crouse was also added to the team with Chris Wagner moving to alternate. This move paid off for the team as they found early success on tour, reaching the final of the PEI Brewing Company Cashspiel, the semifinals of the New Scotland Brewing Co. Cashspiel and the quarterfinals of the Jim Sullivan Curling Classic. They carried this momentum into the 2024 New Brunswick Tankard where they managed to defeat every team in the field besides eventual champion James Grattan who beat them in all three qualifying events. During the 2025 New Brunswick Tankard, the team would not be able to match their previous season's success, going 2–3.

Comeau and Robichaud would then announce that they would be joining team Colten Steele for the 2025–26 season, with Comeau playing third, Robichaud as second, and Cameron Sallaj as lead. They would have a strong start to the season, finishing second at the 2025 Steele Cup Cash event, losing to James Grattan in the final.

=== Mixed ===
Comeau would represent New Brunswick as the skip at the 2025 Canadian Mixed Curling Championship alongside Jennifer Fenwick, Alex Robichaud, and Katie Vandenborre. There, Comeau would win his first national championship, beating Ontario's Sam Mooibroek 6–5 in the final, qualifying to represent Canada at the 2026 World Mixed Curling Championship.

== Personal life ==
Comeau works as a Marketing Communications Specialist at NB Dental Society. He graduated from St. Thomas University. He attended high school at Leo Hayes in Fredericton, NB graduating in 2012

== Teams ==
Season	Skip	Third	Second	Lead
2012–13	Josh Barry	Rene Comeau	Spencer Watts	Andrew O'Dell
2013–14	Rene Comeau	Daniel Wenzek	Jordon Craft	Ryan Freeze
2014–15	Rene Comeau	Andrew Burgess	Alex MacNeil	Ryan Freeze
2015–16	Rene Comeau	Andrew Burgess	Carter Small	Ryan Freeze
2016–17	Rene Comeau	Josh Barry	Andrew Burgess	Robert Daley
2017–18	Rene Comeau (Fourth)	Ed Cyr	Chris Wagner	Wayne Tallon (Skip)
2018–19	Rene Comeau	Ryan Freeze	Jordon Craft	Zac Blanchard
2019–20	Rene Comeau	Ryan Freeze	Jordon Craft	Zac Blanchard
2020–21	Rene Comeau	Adam Freilich	Colton Daly	Ed Moore
2021–22	Rene Comeau	Adam Freilich	Colton Daly	Ed Moore
2022–23	Alex Robichaud	Rene Comeau	Chris Wagner	Alex Kyle
2023–24	Rene Comeau	Alex Robichaud	Trevor Crouse	Alex Kyle
2024–25	Rene Comeau	Alex Robichaud	Trevor Crouse	Alex Kyle
2025–26	Colten Steele	Rene Comeau	Alex Robichaud	Cameron Sallaj
