= 2023 New Brunswick Tankard =

- Host city: Moncton, New Brunswick
- Arena: Curl Moncton
- Dates: February 8–12
- Winner: Team Jones
- Curling club: Curl Moncton, Moncton
- Skip: Scott Jones
- Fourth: Jeremy Mallais
- Second: Brian King
- Lead: Jared Bezanson
- Coach: Mark Ward
- Finalist: Jason Roach

The 2023 New Brunswick Tankard, the provincial men's curling championship for New Brunswick, was held from February 8 to 12 at Curl Moncton in Moncton, New Brunswick. The winning Scott Jones rink represented New Brunswick at the 2023 Tim Hortons Brier in London, Ontario where they finished last in Pool B with a 1–7 record.

The event reverted to the previous format after the previous years event.

== Qualification process ==
Qualification method	Berths	Qualifying teams
2022-23 CTRS Points	2	James Grattan; Scott Jones
Tankard Prelims	6	Zach Eldridge; Trevor Hanson; Mike Kennedy; Jason Roach; Alex Robichaud; Jack Smeltzer

== Teams ==
The teams are listed as follows:

Skip	Third	Second	Lead	Alternate	Club
Zach Eldridge	Chris Jeffrey	Ronnie Burgess	Brody Hanson		Capital WC, Fredericton
James Grattan	Scott McDonald	Paul Dobson	Andy McCann		Gage G&CC, Oromocto
Trevor Hanson	Adam MacDonald	Scott Archibald	Matt Murno		Gage G&CC, Oromocto
Jeremy Mallais (Fourth)	Scott Jones (Skip)	Brian King	Jared Bezanson		Curl Moncton, Moncton
Mike Kennedy	Grant Odishaw	Marc LeCocq	Vance LeCocq	Robert Daley	Capital WC, Fredericton
Jason Roach	Darren Roach	Spencer Mawhinney	Josh Vaughan		Capital WC, Fredericton
Alex Robichaud	Rene Comeau	Chris Wagner	Alex Kyle		Capital WC, Fredericton
Jack Smeltzer	Michael Donovan	Trevor Crouse	Mitchell Small		Capital WC, Fredericton

== Round robin standings ==
Final Round Robin standings

Key
Teams to Playoffs

Skip	W	L	PF	PA	EW	EL	BE	SE
Jason Roach	6	1	54	39	31	26	1	12
Scott Jones	5	2	45	44	29	27	5	8
James Grattan	5	2	57	44	33	28	2	11
Jack Smeltzer	4	3	41	44	23	31	1	6
Alex Robichaud	3	4	47	44	27	27	5	11
Mike Kennedy	3	4	58	47	32	26	4	10
Zach Eldridge	2	5	38	51	23	25	4	6
Trevor Hanson	0	7	35	62	25	33	2	4

== Round Robin results ==
All draw times listed in Atlantic Time (UTC−04:00).

=== Draw 1 ===
Wednesday, February 8, 1:30 pm

Sheet 1	1	2	3	4	5	6	7	8	9	10	Final
Alex Robichaud	1	1	2	1	1	0	0	0	4	X	10
James Grattan 🔨	0	0	0	0	0	1	3	2	0	X	6

Sheet 2	1	2	3	4	5	6	7	8	9	10	Final
Trevor Hanson 🔨	0	2	0	1	0	1	0	1	0	0	5
Scott Jones	0	0	2	0	3	0	1	0	1	1	8

Sheet 3	1	2	3	4	5	6	7	8	9	10	Final
Mike Kennedy 🔨	1	0	1	0	0	0	4	0	4	X	10
Zach Eldridge	0	1	0	1	1	0	0	1	0	X	4

Sheet 4	1	2	3	4	5	6	7	8	9	10	Final
Jason Roach 🔨	1	0	1	2	0	2	1	2	X	X	9
Jack Smeltzer	0	0	0	0	2	0	0	0	X	X	2

=== Draw 2 ===
Wednesday, February 8, 7:30 pm

Sheet 1	1	2	3	4	5	6	7	8	9	10	Final
Zach Eldridge 🔨	0	0	0	1	0	0	X	X	X	X	1
Jack Smeltzer	0	0	1	0	5	1	X	X	X	X	7

Sheet 2	1	2	3	4	5	6	7	8	9	10	Final
Mike Kennedy 🔨	0	0	0	2	0	2	0	3	0	0	7
Jason Roach	0	1	0	0	1	0	4	0	1	1	8

Sheet 3	1	2	3	4	5	6	7	8	9	10	11	Final
Scott Jones 🔨	0	1	0	0	1	0	0	2	0	0	1	5
Alex Robichaud	0	0	2	0	0	1	0	0	0	1	0	4

Sheet 4	1	2	3	4	5	6	7	8	9	10	Final
Trevor Hanson	0	0	2	0	1	0	1	1	0	X	5
James Grattan 🔨	0	2	0	1	0	3	0	0	5	X	11

=== Draw 3 ===
Thursday, February 9, 1:00 pm

Sheet 1	1	2	3	4	5	6	7	8	9	10	Final
Scott Jones	0	0	0	1	0	0	X	X	X	X	1
Mike Kennedy 🔨	2	1	2	0	3	5	X	X	X	X	13

Sheet 2	1	2	3	4	5	6	7	8	9	10	Final
Trevor Hanson	0	0	1	0	0	0	X	X	X	X	1
Zach Eldridge 🔨	0	4	0	4	1	1	X	X	X	X	10

Sheet 3	1	2	3	4	5	6	7	8	9	10	Final
James Grattan 🔨	1	1	0	2	1	1	0	2	X	X	8
Jason Roach	0	0	2	0	0	0	1	0	X	X	3

Sheet 4	1	2	3	4	5	6	7	8	9	10	Final
Alex Robichaud	0	2	1	0	0	1	1	0	0	0	5
Jack Smeltzer 🔨	3	0	0	1	0	0	0	1	1	2	8

=== Draw 4 ===
Thursday, February 9, 7:00 pm

Sheet 1	1	2	3	4	5	6	7	8	9	10	Final
Alex Robichaud 🔨	0	0	0	3	0	1	0	0	X	X	4
Jason Roach	0	1	2	0	1	0	3	2	X	X	9

Sheet 2	1	2	3	4	5	6	7	8	9	10	Final
James Grattan 🔨	0	1	2	1	0	2	0	2	0	X	8
Jack Smeltzer	2	0	0	0	1	0	1	0	2	X	6

Sheet 3	1	2	3	4	5	6	7	8	9	10	Final
Trevor Hanson 🔨	2	0	3	0	2	0	2	0	0	0	9
Mike Kennedy	0	2	0	2	0	1	0	3	1	1	10

Sheet 4	1	2	3	4	5	6	7	8	9	10	Final
Scott Jones 🔨	3	0	0	0	1	0	3	1	0	X	8
Zach Eldridge	0	0	1	1	0	1	0	0	1	X	4

=== Draw 5 ===
Friday, February 10, 2:00 pm

Sheet 1	1	2	3	4	5	6	7	8	9	10	Final
Jack Smeltzer	4	0	0	0	1	0	0	1	0	2	8
Trevor Hanson 🔨	0	1	2	2	0	0	1	0	1	0	7

Sheet 2	1	2	3	4	5	6	7	8	9	10	Final
Jason Roach 🔨	0	0	2	0	3	1	0	3	0	0	9
Scott Jones	1	3	0	1	0	0	1	0	1	1	8

Sheet 3	1	2	3	4	5	6	7	8	9	10	Final
Zach Eldridge	0	4	0	0	0	1	1	0	0	X	6
James Grattan 🔨	1	0	0	4	1	0	0	3	1	X	10

Sheet 4	1	2	3	4	5	6	7	8	9	10	Final
Mike Kennedy	0	1	0	1	1	0	0	2	0	X	5
Alex Robichaud 🔨	0	0	3	0	0	0	2	0	5	X	10

=== Draw 6 ===
Friday, February 10, 7:00 pm

Sheet 1	1	2	3	4	5	6	7	8	9	10	Final
Mike Kennedy 🔨	0	1	0	0	1	0	2	0	2	0	6
James Grattan	0	0	1	1	0	2	0	1	0	2	7

Sheet 2	1	2	3	4	5	6	7	8	9	10	Final
Zach Eldridge 🔨	2	0	1	0	3	0	0	3	1	X	10
Alex Robichaud	0	1	0	3	0	2	1	0	0	X	7

Sheet 3	1	2	3	4	5	6	7	8	9	10	Final
Jack Smeltzer 🔨	0	1	0	0	0	0	1	0	X	X	2
Scott Jones	1	0	0	0	1	3	0	2	X	X	7

Sheet 4	1	2	3	4	5	6	7	8	9	10	11	Final
Jason Roach	0	1	0	2	0	2	0	2	0	0	1	8
Trevor Hanson 🔨	1	0	1	0	1	0	1	0	2	1	0	7

=== Draw 7 ===
Saturday, February 11, 9:00 am

Sheet 1	1	2	3	4	5	6	7	8	9	10	Final
Jason Roach	2	0	3	1	0	0	2	X	X	X	8
Zach Eldridge 🔨	0	2	0	0	1	0	0	X	X	X	3

Sheet 2	1	2	3	4	5	6	7	8	9	10	Final
Jack Smeltzer 🔨	0	3	0	0	0	1	0	2	0	2	8
Mike Kennedy	2	0	1	1	1	0	1	0	1	0	7

Sheet 3	1	2	3	4	5	6	7	8	9	10	Final
Alex Robichaud 🔨	2	1	0	1	2	1	X	X	X	X	7
Trevor Hanson	0	0	1	0	0	0	X	X	X	X	1

Sheet 4	1	2	3	4	5	6	7	8	9	10	Final
James Grattan 🔨	1	0	2	0	2	0	0	1	1	0	7
Scott Jones	0	1	0	2	0	3	1	0	0	1	8

== Playoffs ==
Semifinal			Final
			1	Jason Roach	7
2	Scott Jones	7	2	Scott Jones	8
3	James Grattan	6

=== Semifinal ===
Saturday, February 11, 7:00 pm

Sheet 3	1	2	3	4	5	6	7	8	9	10	11	Final
Scott Jones 🔨	0	2	0	0	1	0	1	1	1	0	1	7
James Grattan	0	0	0	2	0	3	0	0	0	1	0	6

=== Final ===
Sunday, February 12, 2:00 PM

Sheet 4	1	2	3	4	5	6	7	8	9	10	Final
Jason Roach 🔨	1	0	0	0	0	1	2	0	1	2	7
Scott Jones	0	0	3	1	3	0	0	1	0	0	8

2023 New Brunswick Tankard

Scott Jones
5th New Brunswick Provincial Championship title
