= 2025 New Brunswick Tankard =

Canadian provincial men's curling championship

- Host city: Fredericton, New Brunswick
- Arena: Capital Winter Club
- Dates: January 29 – February 2
- Winner: Team Grattan
- Curling club: Gage G&CC, Oromocto
- Skip: James Grattan
- Third: Joel Krats
- Second: Paul Dobson
- Lead: Andy McCann
- Coach: Dean Grattan
- Finalist: Jamie Stewart

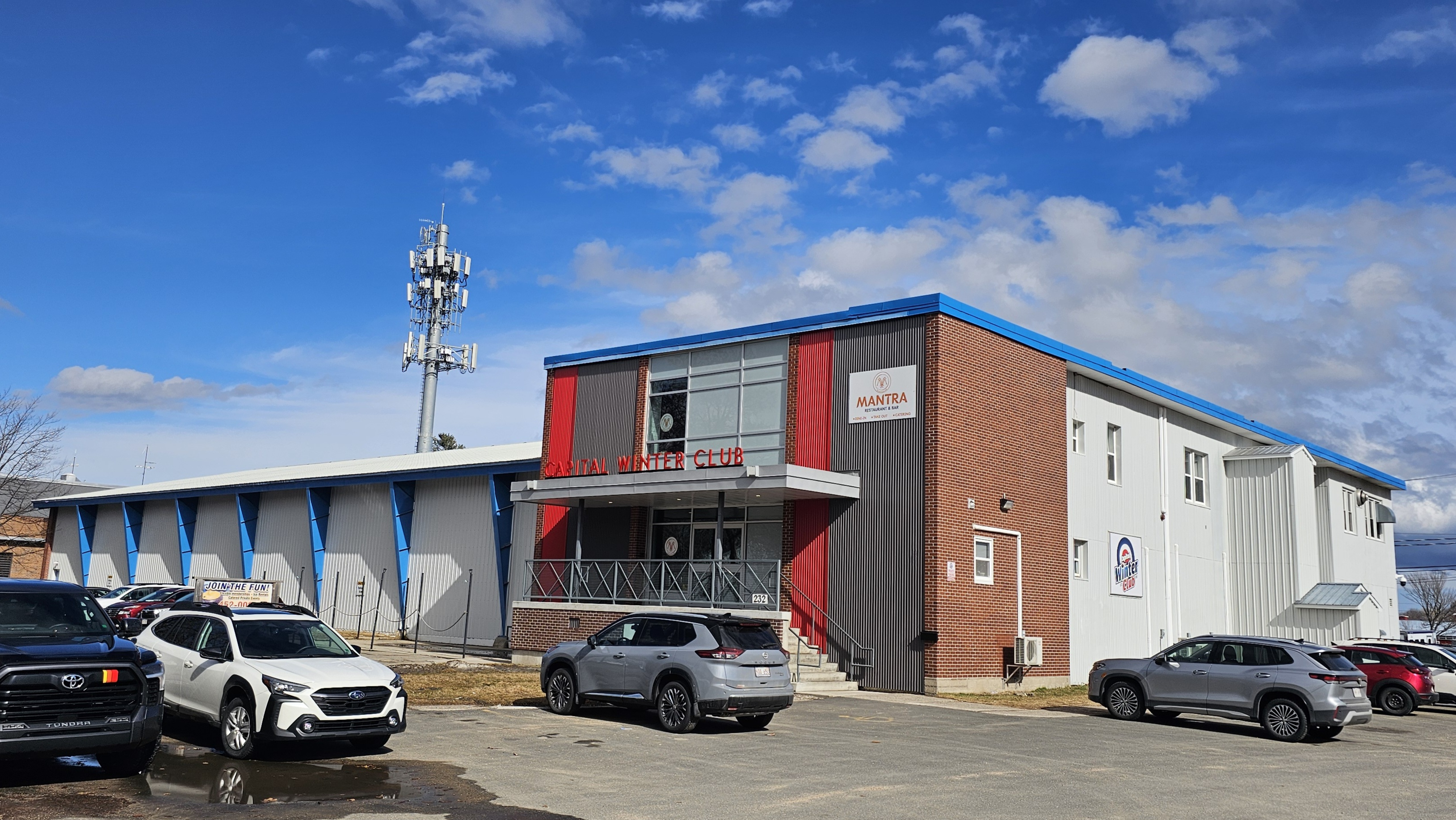
The Capital Winter Club in 2026

The 2025 New Brunswick Tankard, the provincial men's curling championship for New Brunswick, was held from January 29 to February 2 at the Capital Winter Club in Fredericton, New Brunswick. The winning James Grattan rink represented New Brunswick at the 2025 Montana's Brier in Kelowna, British Columbia.

== Teams ==
The teams are listed as follows:

| Skip | Third | Second | Lead | Alternate | Coach | Club |
|---|---|---|---|---|---|---|
| Ryan Cain | Chris McCann | Dean Grattan | Mike Flannery | | | Capital WC, Fredericton |
| Rene Comeau | Alex Robichaud | Trevor Crouse | Alex Kyle | | | Capital WC, Fredericton |
| Dan Crouse | Kevin Keefe | Dave DeAdder | Mike Allain | | | Curl Moncton, Moncton |
| Rajan Dalrymple | Noah Riggs | Drew Grattan | Cameron Sallaj | | | Gage G&CC, Oromocto |
| Zach Eldridge | Jack Smeltzer | Alex Gallant | Michael Donovan | Mitchell Small | | Capital WC, Fredericton |
| Shannon Fenelon | Dmitri Makrides | Kelly Harris | Joel Graham | | | Capital WC, Fredericton |
| James Grattan | Joel Krats | Paul Dobson | Andy McCann | | Dean Grattan | Gage G&CC, Oromocto |
| Brody Hanson | Matt Stanley | Sam Forestell | Daniel Lister | | | Capital WC, Fredericton |
| Trevor Hanson | James Watson | Evan Hanson | Steve Christie | | | Gage G&CC, Oromocto |
| Scott Jones | Jeremy Mallais | Brian King | Jared Bezanson | | | Curl Moncton, Moncton |
| Mike Kennedy | Marc LeCocq | Vance LeCocq | Grant Odishaw | | | Curl Moncton, Moncton |
| Adam MacDonald | Scott Archibald | Matt Munro | Chris Cogswell | | | Woodstock G&CC, Woodstock |
| Luke Robichaud | James Carr | Austen Matheson | Aiden Matheson | | | Capital WC, Fredericton |
| Jamie Stewart | Sean Beland | Aden Kavanaugh | Loris Elliott | | Gary Wilson | Capital WC, Fredericton (UNB Reds) |

== Knockout Brackets ==
=== A Event ===
First Knockout | Qualifier 1
Rene Comeau | 7
Brody Hanson | 5
Brody Hanson | 11
Adam MacDonald | 3
Rene Comeau | 8
Jamie Stewart | 9
Jamie Stewart | 8
Trevor Hanson | 3
Jamie Stewart | 10
Ryan Cain | 2
Luke Robichaud | 4
Ryan Cain | 7
Jamie Stewart | 4
James Grattan | 10
James Grattan | 8
Mike Kennedy | 7
Mike Kennedy | 10
Dan Crouse | 5
James Grattan | 10
Scott Jones | 8
Scott Jones | 10
Shannon Fenelon | 4
Scott Jones | 7
Rajan Dalrymple | 4
Zach Eldridge | 4
Rajan Dalrymple | 9

=== B Event ===
Second Knockout | Qualifier 2
Dan Crouse | 6
Brody Hanson | 16 | Brody Hanson | 7
Scott Jones | 9 | Scott Jones | 4
Jamie Stewart | 7
Adam MacDonald | 7 | Jamie Stewart | 1
Mike Kennedy | 8 | James Grattan | 9
Mike Kennedy | 11
Trevor Hanson | 6 | Rene Comeau | 5 | James Grattan | 7
Luke Robichaud | 5 | Trevor Hanson | 3 | Mike Kennedy | 10 | Mike Kennedy | 4
Rajan Dalrymple | 6 | Rajan Dalrymple | 9
Rajan Dalrymple | 9
Shannon Fenelon | 3 | Zach Eldridge | 5
Zach Eldridge | 11 | Zach Eldridge | 7
Ryan Cain | 4

=== C Event ===
Third Knockout | Qualifier 3
Zach Eldridge | 10 | Jamie Stewart | 9
Luke Robichaud | 7 | Dan Crouse | 3 | Mike Kennedy | 9 | Mike Kennedy | 7
Dan Crouse | 8 | Zach Eldridge | 7 | Zach Eldridge | 3
Rene Comeau | 4 | Jamie Stewart | 9
Rene Comeau | 6 | James Grattan | 6
Trevor Hanson | 4 | Ryan Cain | 5
Ryan Cain | 13 | James Grattan | 8
Scott Jones | 6 | Scott Jones | 6
Rajan Dalrymple | 11 | Brody Hanson | 5
Brody Hanson | 9 | Brody Hanson | 12
Shannon Fenelon | 8 | Shannon Fenelon | 4
Adam MacDonald | 6

== Knockout Results ==
All draw times listed in Atlantic Time (UTC−04:00).

=== Draw 1 ===
Wednesday, January 29, 11:30 am

| Sheet 1 | 1 | 2 | 3 | 4 | 5 | 6 | 7 | 8 | 9 | 10 | Final |
|---|---|---|---|---|---|---|---|---|---|---|---|
| Brody Hanson 🔨 | 2 | 3 | 1 | 0 | 0 | 1 | 0 | 4 | X | X | 11 |
| Adam MacDonald | 0 | 0 | 0 | 1 | 1 | 0 | 1 | 0 | X | X | 3 |

| Sheet 2 | 1 | 2 | 3 | 4 | 5 | 6 | 7 | 8 | 9 | 10 | Final |
|---|---|---|---|---|---|---|---|---|---|---|---|
| Jamie Stewart 🔨 | 2 | 0 | 0 | 1 | 0 | 0 | 2 | 0 | 3 | X | 8 |
| Trevor Hanson | 0 | 0 | 0 | 0 | 0 | 1 | 0 | 2 | 0 | X | 3 |

| Sheet 3 | 1 | 2 | 3 | 4 | 5 | 6 | 7 | 8 | 9 | 10 | Final |
|---|---|---|---|---|---|---|---|---|---|---|---|
| Mike Kennedy 🔨 | 0 | 0 | 5 | 0 | 0 | 2 | 1 | 2 | X | X | 10 |
| Dan Crouse | 1 | 1 | 0 | 2 | 1 | 0 | 0 | 0 | X | X | 5 |

| Sheet 4 | 1 | 2 | 3 | 4 | 5 | 6 | 7 | 8 | 9 | 10 | Final |
|---|---|---|---|---|---|---|---|---|---|---|---|
| Scott Jones 🔨 | 0 | 0 | 0 | 4 | 0 | 4 | 0 | 2 | X | X | 10 |
| Shannon Fenelon | 1 | 1 | 0 | 0 | 1 | 0 | 1 | 0 | X | X | 4 |

=== Draw 2 ===
Wednesday, January 29, 4:30 pm

| Sheet 1 | 1 | 2 | 3 | 4 | 5 | 6 | 7 | 8 | 9 | 10 | Final |
|---|---|---|---|---|---|---|---|---|---|---|---|
| James Grattan | 0 | 1 | 0 | 1 | 0 | 2 | 1 | 0 | 2 | 1 | 8 |
| Mike Kennedy 🔨 | 2 | 0 | 2 | 0 | 1 | 0 | 0 | 2 | 0 | 0 | 7 |

| Sheet 2 | 1 | 2 | 3 | 4 | 5 | 6 | 7 | 8 | 9 | 10 | Final |
|---|---|---|---|---|---|---|---|---|---|---|---|
| Luke Robichaud 🔨 | 0 | 0 | 2 | 0 | 1 | 0 | 0 | 1 | 0 | 0 | 4 |
| Ryan Cain | 0 | 0 | 0 | 1 | 0 | 1 | 3 | 0 | 1 | 1 | 7 |

| Sheet 3 | 1 | 2 | 3 | 4 | 5 | 6 | 7 | 8 | 9 | 10 | Final |
|---|---|---|---|---|---|---|---|---|---|---|---|
| Rene Comeau 🔨 | 2 | 0 | 1 | 0 | 1 | 1 | 0 | 0 | 2 | 0 | 7 |
| Brody Hanson | 0 | 1 | 0 | 2 | 0 | 0 | 1 | 0 | 0 | 1 | 5 |

| Sheet 4 | 1 | 2 | 3 | 4 | 5 | 6 | 7 | 8 | 9 | 10 | Final |
|---|---|---|---|---|---|---|---|---|---|---|---|
| Zach Eldridge | 0 | 1 | 0 | 1 | 0 | 1 | 0 | 1 | 0 | X | 4 |
| Rajan Dalrymple 🔨 | 1 | 0 | 2 | 0 | 1 | 0 | 3 | 0 | 2 | X | 9 |

=== Draw 3 ===
Wednesday, January 29, 9:30 pm

| Sheet 1 | 1 | 2 | 3 | 4 | 5 | 6 | 7 | 8 | 9 | 10 | Final |
|---|---|---|---|---|---|---|---|---|---|---|---|
| Scott Jones 🔨 | 0 | 1 | 0 | 0 | 2 | 0 | 0 | 2 | 1 | 1 | 7 |
| Rajan Dalrymple | 0 | 0 | 0 | 2 | 0 | 1 | 1 | 0 | 0 | 0 | 4 |

| Sheet 2 | 1 | 2 | 3 | 4 | 5 | 6 | 7 | 8 | 9 | 10 | Final |
|---|---|---|---|---|---|---|---|---|---|---|---|
| Shannon Fenelon | 0 | 0 | 0 | 2 | 1 | 0 | 0 | 0 | X | X | 3 |
| Zach Eldridge 🔨 | 2 | 3 | 1 | 0 | 0 | 2 | 2 | 1 | X | X | 11 |

| Sheet 3 | 1 | 2 | 3 | 4 | 5 | 6 | 7 | 8 | 9 | 10 | Final |
|---|---|---|---|---|---|---|---|---|---|---|---|
| Jamie Stewart 🔨 | 1 | 0 | 3 | 3 | 2 | 1 | X | X | X | X | 10 |
| Ryan Cain | 0 | 2 | 0 | 0 | 0 | 0 | X | X | X | X | 2 |

| Sheet 4 | 1 | 2 | 3 | 4 | 5 | 6 | 7 | 8 | 9 | 10 | Final |
|---|---|---|---|---|---|---|---|---|---|---|---|
| Trevor Hanson | 0 | 1 | 0 | 0 | 3 | 1 | 0 | 1 | 0 | 0 | 6 |
| Luke Robichaud 🔨 | 0 | 0 | 0 | 3 | 0 | 0 | 1 | 0 | 0 | 1 | 5 |

=== Draw 4 ===
Thursday, January 30, 9:30 am

| Sheet 1 | 1 | 2 | 3 | 4 | 5 | 6 | 7 | 8 | 9 | 10 | Final |
|---|---|---|---|---|---|---|---|---|---|---|---|
| Zach Eldridge 🔨 | 0 | 2 | 1 | 0 | 1 | 0 | 1 | 1 | 0 | 1 | 7 |
| Ryan Cain | 2 | 0 | 0 | 0 | 0 | 1 | 0 | 0 | 1 | 0 | 4 |

| Sheet 2 | 1 | 2 | 3 | 4 | 5 | 6 | 7 | 8 | 9 | 10 | Final |
|---|---|---|---|---|---|---|---|---|---|---|---|
| Dan Crouse | 0 | 2 | 0 | 1 | 0 | 3 | 0 | 0 | X | X | 6 |
| Brody Hanson 🔨 | 4 | 0 | 2 | 0 | 3 | 0 | 6 | 1 | X | X | 16 |

| Sheet 3 | 1 | 2 | 3 | 4 | 5 | 6 | 7 | 8 | 9 | 10 | Final |
|---|---|---|---|---|---|---|---|---|---|---|---|
| Trevor Hanson 🔨 | 1 | 0 | 1 | 0 | 0 | 0 | 0 | 1 | 0 | 0 | 3 |
| Rajan Dalrymple | 0 | 1 | 0 | 0 | 2 | 0 | 1 | 0 | 1 | 1 | 6 |

| Sheet 4 | 1 | 2 | 3 | 4 | 5 | 6 | 7 | 8 | 9 | 10 | Final |
|---|---|---|---|---|---|---|---|---|---|---|---|
| Adam MacDonald | 0 | 0 | 1 | 0 | 0 | 3 | 1 | 0 | 1 | 1 | 7 |
| Mike Kennedy 🔨 | 1 | 2 | 0 | 2 | 0 | 0 | 0 | 3 | 0 | 0 | 8 |

=== Draw 5 ===
Thursday, January 30, 3:00 pm

| Sheet 1 | 1 | 2 | 3 | 4 | 5 | 6 | 7 | 8 | 9 | 10 | 11 | Final |
|---|---|---|---|---|---|---|---|---|---|---|---|---|
| Luke Robichaud | 0 | 1 | 0 | 2 | 0 | 1 | 1 | 1 | 1 | 0 | 0 | 7 |
| Dan Crouse 🔨 | 1 | 0 | 3 | 0 | 2 | 0 | 0 | 0 | 0 | 1 | 1 | 8 |

| Sheet 2 | 1 | 2 | 3 | 4 | 5 | 6 | 7 | 8 | 9 | 10 | Final |
|---|---|---|---|---|---|---|---|---|---|---|---|
| James Grattan | 0 | 0 | 5 | 0 | 3 | 0 | 0 | 1 | 0 | 1 | 10 |
| Scott Jones 🔨 | 1 | 0 | 0 | 2 | 0 | 1 | 2 | 0 | 2 | 0 | 8 |

| Sheet 3 | 1 | 2 | 3 | 4 | 5 | 6 | 7 | 8 | 9 | 10 | Final |
|---|---|---|---|---|---|---|---|---|---|---|---|
| Shannon Fenelon | 0 | 3 | 0 | 1 | 1 | 0 | 1 | 0 | 0 | 2 | 8 |
| Adam MacDonald 🔨 | 1 | 0 | 1 | 0 | 0 | 1 | 0 | 1 | 2 | 0 | 6 |

| Sheet 4 | 1 | 2 | 3 | 4 | 5 | 6 | 7 | 8 | 9 | 10 | Final |
|---|---|---|---|---|---|---|---|---|---|---|---|
| Rene Comeau | 1 | 2 | 0 | 2 | 0 | 0 | 2 | 1 | 0 | 0 | 8 |
| Jamie Stewart 🔨 | 0 | 0 | 2 | 0 | 3 | 1 | 0 | 0 | 1 | 2 | 9 |

=== Draw 6 ===
Thursday, January 30, 8:30 pm

| Sheet 1 | 1 | 2 | 3 | 4 | 5 | 6 | 7 | 8 | 9 | 10 | Final |
|---|---|---|---|---|---|---|---|---|---|---|---|
| Brody Hanson 🔨 | 2 | 0 | 2 | 0 | 1 | 0 | 0 | 1 | 0 | 1 | 7 |
| Scott Jones | 0 | 3 | 0 | 3 | 0 | 1 | 0 | 0 | 2 | 0 | 9 |

| Sheet 2 | 1 | 2 | 3 | 4 | 5 | 6 | 7 | 8 | 9 | 10 | Final |
|---|---|---|---|---|---|---|---|---|---|---|---|
| Rajan Dalrymple 🔨 | 0 | 3 | 0 | 1 | 0 | 2 | 2 | 0 | 1 | X | 9 |
| Zach Eldridge | 1 | 0 | 1 | 0 | 1 | 0 | 0 | 2 | 0 | X | 5 |

| Sheet 3 | 1 | 2 | 3 | 4 | 5 | 6 | 7 | 8 | 9 | 10 | Final |
|---|---|---|---|---|---|---|---|---|---|---|---|
| Mike Kennedy 🔨 | 1 | 0 | 2 | 0 | 3 | 1 | 0 | 2 | 2 | X | 11 |
| Rene Comeau | 0 | 1 | 0 | 2 | 0 | 0 | 2 | 0 | 0 | X | 5 |

| Sheet 4 | 1 | 2 | 3 | 4 | 5 | 6 | 7 | 8 | 9 | 10 | Final |
|---|---|---|---|---|---|---|---|---|---|---|---|
| Trevor Hanson | 0 | 1 | 0 | 0 | 1 | 2 | 0 | X | X | X | 4 |
| Ryan Cain 🔨 | 2 | 0 | 3 | 2 | 0 | 0 | 6 | X | X | X | 13 |

=== Draw 7 ===
Friday, January 31, 9:30 am

| Sheet 3 | 1 | 2 | 3 | 4 | 5 | 6 | 7 | 8 | 9 | 10 | Final |
|---|---|---|---|---|---|---|---|---|---|---|---|
| Jamie Stewart | 1 | 0 | 0 | 0 | 2 | 0 | 1 | 0 | X | X | 4 |
| James Grattan 🔨 | 0 | 1 | 1 | 2 | 0 | 3 | 0 | 3 | X | X | 10 |

=== Draw 8 ===
Friday, January 31, 3:00 pm

| Sheet 1 | 1 | 2 | 3 | 4 | 5 | 6 | 7 | 8 | 9 | 10 | Final |
|---|---|---|---|---|---|---|---|---|---|---|---|
| Mike Kennedy 🔨 | 1 | 0 | 1 | 0 | 2 | 0 | 4 | 1 | 0 | 1 | 10 |
| Rajan Dalrymple | 0 | 1 | 0 | 3 | 0 | 2 | 0 | 0 | 3 | 0 | 9 |

| Sheet 2 | 1 | 2 | 3 | 4 | 5 | 6 | 7 | 8 | 9 | 10 | 11 | Final |
|---|---|---|---|---|---|---|---|---|---|---|---|---|
| Rene Comeau 🔨 | 0 | 2 | 0 | 0 | 0 | 0 | 1 | 1 | 1 | 0 | 1 | 6 |
| Ryan Cain | 0 | 0 | 0 | 0 | 2 | 1 | 0 | 0 | 0 | 2 | 0 | 5 |

| Sheet 3 | 1 | 2 | 3 | 4 | 5 | 6 | 7 | 8 | 9 | 10 | Final |
|---|---|---|---|---|---|---|---|---|---|---|---|
| Zach Eldridge 🔨 | 4 | 1 | 0 | 0 | 3 | 0 | 2 | 0 | X | X | 10 |
| Dan Crouse | 0 | 0 | 1 | 1 | 0 | 0 | 0 | 1 | X | X | 3 |

| Sheet 4 | 1 | 2 | 3 | 4 | 5 | 6 | 7 | 8 | 9 | 10 | Final |
|---|---|---|---|---|---|---|---|---|---|---|---|
| Brody Hanson | 1 | 0 | 2 | 0 | 0 | 6 | 0 | 0 | X | X | 9 |
| Shannon Fenelon 🔨 | 0 | 0 | 0 | 1 | 2 | 0 | 0 | 1 | X | X | 4 |

=== Draw 9 ===
Friday, January 31, 8:30 pm

| Sheet 1 | 1 | 2 | 3 | 4 | 5 | 6 | 7 | 8 | 9 | 10 | Final |
|---|---|---|---|---|---|---|---|---|---|---|---|
| Zach Eldridge | 0 | 2 | 0 | 0 | 3 | 0 | 2 | 0 | 0 | X | 7 |
| Rene Comeau 🔨 | 0 | 0 | 1 | 0 | 0 | 1 | 0 | 1 | 1 | X | 4 |

| Sheet 2 | 1 | 2 | 3 | 4 | 5 | 6 | 7 | 8 | 9 | 10 | Final |
|---|---|---|---|---|---|---|---|---|---|---|---|
| Scott Jones 🔨 | 0 | 1 | 0 | 1 | 0 | 2 | 0 | 0 | 0 | 0 | 4 |
| Jamie Stewart | 0 | 0 | 2 | 0 | 1 | 0 | 1 | 1 | 1 | 1 | 7 |

| Sheet 3 | 1 | 2 | 3 | 4 | 5 | 6 | 7 | 8 | 9 | 10 | 11 | Final |
|---|---|---|---|---|---|---|---|---|---|---|---|---|
| Rajan Dalrymple | 0 | 4 | 0 | 3 | 1 | 1 | 0 | 1 | 0 | 1 | 0 | 11 |
| Brody Hanson 🔨 | 3 | 0 | 5 | 0 | 0 | 0 | 2 | 0 | 1 | 0 | 1 | 12 |

| Sheet 4 | 1 | 2 | 3 | 4 | 5 | 6 | 7 | 8 | 9 | 10 | Final |
|---|---|---|---|---|---|---|---|---|---|---|---|
| James Grattan | 0 | 2 | 0 | 1 | 0 | 1 | 0 | 0 | 3 | X | 7 |
| Mike Kennedy 🔨 | 1 | 0 | 0 | 0 | 2 | 0 | 1 | 0 | 0 | X | 4 |

=== Draw 10 ===
Saturday, February 1, 9:30 am

| Sheet 2 | 1 | 2 | 3 | 4 | 5 | 6 | 7 | 8 | 9 | 10 | Final |
|---|---|---|---|---|---|---|---|---|---|---|---|
| Mike Kennedy | 1 | 0 | 1 | 2 | 0 | 1 | 0 | 4 | X | X | 9 |
| Zach Eldridge 🔨 | 0 | 1 | 0 | 0 | 1 | 0 | 1 | 0 | X | X | 3 |

| Sheet 3 | 1 | 2 | 3 | 4 | 5 | 6 | 7 | 8 | 9 | 10 | Final |
|---|---|---|---|---|---|---|---|---|---|---|---|
| Jamie Stewart | 0 | 0 | 1 | 0 | 0 | 0 | X | X | X | X | 1 |
| James Grattan 🔨 | 3 | 2 | 0 | 2 | 2 | 0 | X | X | X | X | 9 |

| Sheet 4 | 1 | 2 | 3 | 4 | 5 | 6 | 7 | 8 | 9 | 10 | 11 | Final |
|---|---|---|---|---|---|---|---|---|---|---|---|---|
| Scott Jones | 0 | 0 | 2 | 0 | 2 | 0 | 1 | 0 | 0 | 0 | 1 | 6 |
| Brody Hanson 🔨 | 0 | 0 | 0 | 2 | 0 | 0 | 0 | 1 | 1 | 1 | 0 | 5 |

=== Draw 11 ===
Saturday, February 1, 3:00 pm

| Sheet 2 | 1 | 2 | 3 | 4 | 5 | 6 | 7 | 8 | 9 | 10 | Final |
|---|---|---|---|---|---|---|---|---|---|---|---|
| James Grattan | 3 | 0 | 2 | 0 | 0 | 2 | 0 | 1 | 0 | X | 8 |
| Scott Jones 🔨 | 0 | 1 | 0 | 2 | 1 | 0 | 1 | 0 | 1 | X | 6 |

| Sheet 4 | 1 | 2 | 3 | 4 | 5 | 6 | 7 | 8 | 9 | 10 | Final |
|---|---|---|---|---|---|---|---|---|---|---|---|
| Jamie Stewart | 0 | 1 | 0 | 3 | 0 | 2 | 2 | 1 | 0 | X | 9 |
| Mike Kennedy 🔨 | 1 | 0 | 2 | 0 | 2 | 0 | 0 | 0 | 2 | X | 7 |

=== Draw 12 ===
Sunday, February 2, 9:30 am

| Sheet 3 | 1 | 2 | 3 | 4 | 5 | 6 | 7 | 8 | 9 | 10 | Final |
|---|---|---|---|---|---|---|---|---|---|---|---|
| Jamie Stewart | 0 | 0 | 1 | 0 | 1 | 0 | 2 | 0 | 0 | 5 | 9 |
| James Grattan 🔨 | 0 | 3 | 0 | 1 | 0 | 0 | 0 | 0 | 2 | 0 | 6 |

== Playoffs ==
As Team Grattan won both the A and B events, they had to be beaten twice in the playoffs.

| Semifinal | | | Final |
| | | | A | James Grattan |
| B | James Grattan | 8 | B | James Grattan |
| C | Jamie Stewart | 2 |

=== Semifinal ===
Sunday, February 2, 2:30 pm

| Sheet 3 | 1 | 2 | 3 | 4 | 5 | 6 | 7 | 8 | 9 | 10 | Final |
|---|---|---|---|---|---|---|---|---|---|---|---|
| James Grattan 🔨 | 0 | 2 | 2 | 1 | 0 | 0 | 0 | 3 | X | X | 8 |
| Jamie Stewart | 0 | 0 | 0 | 0 | 0 | 1 | 1 | 0 | X | X | 2 |

2025 New Brunswick Tankard

James Grattan
16th New Brunswick Provincial Championship title
