= 2025 Canadian Mixed Curling Championship =

- Host city: Assiniboia, Saskatchewan
- Arena: Assiniboia Curling Club
- Dates: November 2–8
- Winner: New Brunswick
- Curling club: Capital Winter Club, Fredericton
- Skip: Rene Comeau
- Third: Jennifer Fenwick
- Second: Alex Robichaud
- Lead: Katie Vandenborre
- Finalist: Ontario (Mooibroek)

The 2025 Canadian Mixed Curling Championship was held from November 2 to 8 at the Assiniboia Curling Club in Assiniboia, Saskatchewan, and marked the first time Assiniboia has hosted a Curling Canada national championship event. The winning team of New Brunswick's Rene Comeau will represent Canada at the 2026 World Mixed Curling Championship.

== Teams ==
The teams are listed as follows:

Team	Skip	Third	Second	Lead	Locale
Alberta	Jessie Hunkin	Nathan Connelly	Anna Munroe	Evan Asmussen	Crestwood CC, Crestwood & Manning CC, Manning
British Columbia	Miles Craig	Steph Jackson-Baier	Chris Baier	Sarah Loken	Victoria CC, Victoria
Manitoba	Sean Grassie	Roxie Trembath	Jordan Johnson	Hilary Johnson	Deer Lodge CC, Winnipeg
New Brunswick	Rene Comeau	Jennifer Fenwick	Alex Robichaud	Katie Vandenborre	Capital Winter Club, Fredericton
Newfoundland and Labrador	Rod Feltham	Brooke Godsland	Aaron Feltham	Sarah McNeil Lamswood	Gander CC, Gander
Northern Ontario	Charlie Robert	Alissa Begin	Chris Glibota	Megan St. Amand	YNCU CC, Sault Ste. Marie
Northwest Territories	Betti Delorey	D’arcy Delorey	Halli-Rai Delorey	Glenn Smit	Hay River CC, Hay River
Nova Scotia	Brent MacDougall	Erin Carmody	Chris Jeffrey	Jenn Mitchell	Halifax CC, Halifax
Nunavut	Peter Van Strien	Sadie Pinksen	Justin McDonell	Alison Taylor	Iqaluit CC, Iqaluit
Ontario	Sam Mooibroek	Emma Artichuk	Wyatt Small	Jamie Smith	KW Granite Club, Waterloo
Prince Edward Island	Eddie MacKenzie	Michelle Shea	Ryan Giddens	Meaghan Hughes	Cornwall CC, Cornwall
Quebec	Yannick Martel	Kelly Tremblay	Jean-François Charest	Émilie Padbury	CC Chicoutimi, Chicoutimi, CC Nairn, Clermont, CC Jacques-Cartier, Quebec City
Saskatchewan	Jason Ackerman	Robyn Silvernagle	Sam Wills	Colleen Ackerman	Highland CC, Regina
Yukon	Scott Williamson	Ruth Siciliano	Bob Walker	Laura Williamson	Whitehorse CC, Whitehorse

== Round robin standings ==
Final Round Robin Standings

Key
Teams to Championship Pool

Pool A	Skip	W	L	W-L	LSD
Ontario	Sam Mooibroek	6	0	–	670.0
Saskatchewan	Jason Ackerman	5	1	–	911.0
Newfoundland and Labrador	Rod Feltham	4	2	–	773.5
Quebec	Yannick Martel	3	3	–	435.4
Northwest Territories	Betti Delorey	1	5	1–1	905.6
Northern Ontario	Charlie Robert	1	5	1–1	983.7
Nunavut	Peter Van Strien	1	5	1–1	1020.7

Pool B	Skip	W	L	W-L	LSD
New Brunswick	Rene Comeau	5	1	–	413.5
Manitoba	Sean Grassie	4	2	1–1	845.4
Nova Scotia	Brent MacDougall	4	2	1–1	1004.2
British Columbia	Miles Craig	4	2	1–1	1076.7
Alberta	Jessie Hunkin	3	3	–	538.2
Prince Edward Island	Eddie MacKenzie	1	5	–	667.1
Yukon	Scott Williamson	0	6	–	1276.1

== Round robin results ==
All draws are listed in Central Standard Time (UTC−06:00).

=== Draw 1 ===
Sunday, November 2, 12:30 pm

Sheet A	1	2	3	4	5	6	7	8	Final
Saskatchewan (Ackerman)	1	3	1	0	0	0	1	2	8
Northwest Territories (Delorey) 🔨	0	0	0	1	1	1	0	0	3

Sheet B	1	2	3	4	5	6	7	8	Final
Quebec (Martel)	0	3	0	2	0	2	0	X	7
Northern Ontario (Robert) 🔨	1	0	1	0	1	0	1	X	4

Sheet C	1	2	3	4	5	6	7	8	Final
British Columbia (Craig)	1	0	1	0	2	1	0	X	5
Alberta (Hunkin) 🔨	0	1	0	1	0	0	1	X	3

Sheet D	1	2	3	4	5	6	7	8	Final
Nova Scotia (MacDougall)	0	0	2	0	1	0	0	2	5
Manitoba (Grassie) 🔨	0	1	0	2	0	1	0	0	4

=== Draw 2 ===
Sunday, November 2, 5:30 pm

Sheet A	1	2	3	4	5	6	7	8	Final
Ontario (Mooibroek) 🔨	4	0	1	0	1	2	X	X	8
Northern Ontario (Robert)	0	1	0	1	0	0	X	X	2

Sheet B	1	2	3	4	5	6	7	8	Final
Newfoundland and Labrador (Feltham) 🔨	2	0	1	0	0	0	3	X	6
Nunavut (Van Strien)	0	1	0	1	1	0	0	X	3

Sheet C	1	2	3	4	5	6	7	8	9	Final
New Brunswick (Comeau)	0	0	3	1	0	0	0	0	2	6
Prince Edward Island (MacKenzie) 🔨	0	1	0	0	1	0	1	1	0	4

Sheet D	1	2	3	4	5	6	7	8	Final
British Columbia (Craig)	0	0	2	0	2	1	0	1	6
Nova Scotia (MacDougall) 🔨	2	1	0	1	0	0	1	0	5

=== Draw 3 ===
Monday, November 3, 10:00 am

Sheet C	1	2	3	4	5	6	7	8	Final
Manitoba (Grassie)	0	1	0	1	0	4	0	X	6
Yukon (Williamson) 🔨	1	0	0	0	1	0	2	X	4

Sheet D	1	2	3	4	5	6	7	8	Final
Saskatchewan (Ackerman)	0	3	1	1	0	2	0	X	7
Quebec (Martel) 🔨	2	0	0	0	1	0	1	X	4

=== Draw 4 ===
Monday, November 3, 2:00 pm

Sheet A	1	2	3	4	5	6	7	8	Final
Nova Scotia (MacDougall)	0	0	2	0	0	1	0	X	3
New Brunswick (Comeau) 🔨	1	1	0	2	1	0	4	X	9

Sheet B	1	2	3	4	5	6	7	8	Final
Alberta (Hunkin) 🔨	2	4	1	1	0	4	X	X	12
Prince Edward Island (MacKenzie)	0	0	0	0	1	0	X	X	1

Sheet C	1	2	3	4	5	6	7	8	Final
Northwest Territories (Delorey)	2	1	0	0	0	1	0	0	4
Nunavut (Van Strien) 🔨	0	0	2	1	1	0	2	1	7

Sheet D	1	2	3	4	5	6	7	8	Final
Newfoundland and Labrador (Feltham) 🔨	1	0	1	0	2	2	1	X	7
Northern Ontario (Robert)	0	1	0	1	0	0	0	X	2

=== Draw 5 ===
Monday, November 3, 6:00 pm

Sheet A	1	2	3	4	5	6	7	8	Final
Nunavut (Van Strien)	0	0	2	0	1	0	X	X	3
Saskatchewan (Ackerman) 🔨	6	2	0	3	0	3	X	X	14

Sheet B	1	2	3	4	5	6	7	8	Final
Ontario (Mooibroek) 🔨	0	2	2	0	1	4	X	X	9
Newfoundland and Labrador (Feltham)	1	0	0	1	0	0	X	X	2

Sheet C	1	2	3	4	5	6	7	8	9	Final
Alberta (Hunkin) 🔨	1	0	1	0	1	1	0	2	0	6
Manitoba (Grassie)	0	2	0	2	0	0	2	0	1	7

Sheet D	1	2	3	4	5	6	7	8	Final
Yukon (Williamson)	1	0	0	0	2	0	X	X	3
British Columbia (Craig) 🔨	0	1	2	2	0	5	X	X	10

=== Draw 6 ===
Tuesday, November 4, 10:00 am

Sheet A	1	2	3	4	5	6	7	8	Final
Prince Edward Island (MacKenzie)	0	1	0	0	1	0	2	2	6
British Columbia (Craig) 🔨	2	0	0	3	0	2	0	0	7

Sheet B	1	2	3	4	5	6	7	8	Final
Yukon (Williamson)	0	2	0	0	0	0	X	X	2
New Brunswick (Comeau) 🔨	4	0	4	2	1	3	X	X	14

Sheet C	1	2	3	4	5	6	7	8	Final
Ontario (Mooibroek)	2	2	1	1	0	0	1	X	7
Saskatchewan (Ackerman) 🔨	0	0	0	0	1	1	0	X	2

Sheet D	1	2	3	4	5	6	7	8	Final
Quebec (Martel) 🔨	4	1	1	0	0	2	0	X	8
Northwest Territories (Delorey)	0	0	0	2	1	0	1	X	4

=== Draw 7 ===
Tuesday, November 4, 2:00 pm

Sheet A	1	2	3	4	5	6	7	8	Final
Alberta (Hunkin)	0	1	0	2	0	1	0	0	4
Nova Scotia (MacDougall) 🔨	2	0	1	0	1	0	3	1	8

Sheet B	1	2	3	4	5	6	7	8	Final
Northern Ontario (Robert)	0	0	1	0	0	1	0	X	2
Saskatchewan (Ackerman) 🔨	1	1	0	0	2	0	3	X	7

Sheet C	1	2	3	4	5	6	7	8	Final
Newfoundland and Labrador (Feltham) 🔨	0	0	2	0	0	3	2	1	8
Quebec (Martel)	0	1	0	3	1	0	0	0	5

Sheet D	1	2	3	4	5	6	7	8	Final
New Brunswick (Comeau) 🔨	0	1	0	0	1	0	0	2	4
Manitoba (Grassie)	0	0	0	2	0	1	0	0	3

=== Draw 8 ===
Tuesday, November 4, 6:00 pm

Sheet A	1	2	3	4	5	6	7	8	Final
Nunavut (Van Strien)	0	2	0	0	0	0	X	X	2
Ontario (Mooibroek) 🔨	1	0	1	3	3	1	X	X	9

Sheet B	1	2	3	4	5	6	7	8	Final
Manitoba (Grassie) 🔨	1	1	0	0	2	0	3	1	8
British Columbia (Craig)	0	0	2	1	0	1	0	0	4

Sheet C	1	2	3	4	5	6	7	8	Final
Northern Ontario (Robert) 🔨	0	2	0	2	0	0	1	1	6
Northwest Territories (Delorey)	1	0	1	0	2	3	0	0	7

Sheet D	1	2	3	4	5	6	7	8	Final
Prince Edward Island (MacKenzie) 🔨	3	2	0	2	0	0	1	X	8
Yukon (Williamson)	0	0	2	0	1	2	0	X	5

=== Draw 9 ===
Wednesday, November 5, 10:00 am

Sheet A	1	2	3	4	5	6	7	8	Final
Yukon (Williamson)	0	0	1	0	0	1	0	X	2
Alberta (Hunkin) 🔨	0	1	0	1	2	0	5	X	9

Sheet B	1	2	3	4	5	6	7	8	Final
Nunavut (Van Strien)	0	1	0	1	0	0	X	X	2
Quebec (Martel) 🔨	2	0	2	0	5	2	X	X	11

Sheet C	1	2	3	4	5	6	7	8	Final
Prince Edward Island (MacKenzie) 🔨	0	0	1	3	0	0	0	1	5
Nova Scotia (MacDougall)	0	0	0	0	3	1	2	0	6

Sheet D	1	2	3	4	5	6	7	8	Final
Northwest Territories (Delorey)	0	2	0	0	0	0	X	X	2
Ontario (Mooibroek) 🔨	3	0	3	1	1	3	X	X	11

=== Draw 10 ===
Wednesday, November 5, 2:00 pm

Sheet A	1	2	3	4	5	6	7	8	Final
Manitoba (Grassie)	3	3	0	1	0	1	0	X	8
Prince Edward Island (MacKenzie) 🔨	0	0	1	0	1	0	2	X	4

Sheet B	1	2	3	4	5	6	7	8	Final
British Columbia (Craig)	0	0	2	0	0	0	0	X	2
New Brunswick (Comeau) 🔨	0	2	0	1	1	1	5	X	10

Sheet C	1	2	3	4	5	6	7	8	Final
Saskatchewan (Ackerman)	0	1	0	1	0	2	2	X	6
Newfoundland and Labrador (Feltham) 🔨	0	0	2	0	1	0	0	X	3

Sheet D	1	2	3	4	5	6	7	8	Final
Northern Ontario (Robert)	1	0	2	1	0	0	4	X	8
Nunavut (Van Strien) 🔨	0	1	0	0	1	0	0	X	2

=== Draw 11 ===
Wednesday, November 5, 6:00 pm

Sheet A	1	2	3	4	5	6	7	8	Final
Northwest Territories (Delorey) 🔨	2	0	0	0	0	0	0	X	2
Newfoundland and Labrador (Feltham)	0	2	2	1	2	1	1	X	9

Sheet B	1	2	3	4	5	6	7	8	Final
Nova Scotia (MacDougall) 🔨	3	0	1	2	0	3	X	X	9
Yukon (Williamson)	0	1	0	0	1	0	X	X	2

Sheet C	1	2	3	4	5	6	7	8	Final
Quebec (Martel) 🔨	0	0	1	1	0	0	X	X	2
Ontario (Mooibroek)	2	2	0	0	2	3	X	X	9

Sheet D	1	2	3	4	5	6	7	8	Final
New Brunswick (Comeau) 🔨	0	0	0	0	1	0	2	0	3
Alberta (Hunkin)	0	0	0	1	0	1	0	2	4

== Seeding pool ==
=== Standings ===
Final Seeding Pool Standings

Team	Skip	W	L	W-L	LSD
Alberta	Jessie Hunkin	6	3	–	731.3
Nunavut	Peter Van Strien	3	6	1–0	1374.6
Prince Edward Island	Eddie MacKenzie	3	6	0–1	938.0
Northwest Territories	Betti Delorey	2	7	1–0	1508.6
Northern Ontario	Charlie Robert	2	7	0–1	1396.9
Yukon	Scott Williamson	0	9	–	1890.4

=== Results ===
==== Draw 12 ====
Thursday, November 6, 9:00 am

Sheet A	1	2	3	4	5	6	7	8	Final
Nunavut (Van Strien)	0	0	0	0	0	0	X	X	0
Alberta (Hunkin) 🔨	2	1	4	1	3	2	X	X	13

Sheet B	1	2	3	4	5	6	7	8	Final
Northern Ontario (Robert)	0	1	0	1	0	0	1	0	3
Prince Edward Island (MacKenzie) 🔨	2	0	1	0	0	2	0	1	6

Sheet C	1	2	3	4	5	6	7	8	Final
Northwest Territories (Delorey) 🔨	2	2	0	0	1	0	2	X	7
Yukon (Williamson)	0	0	1	1	0	1	0	X	3

==== Draw 14 ====
Thursday, November 6, 4:00 pm

Sheet B	1	2	3	4	5	6	7	8	Final
Northwest Territories (Delorey)	0	1	0	1	0	0	0	X	2
Alberta (Hunkin) 🔨	2	0	2	0	2	1	4	X	11

Sheet C	1	2	3	4	5	6	7	8	Final
Nunavut (Van Strien)	0	1	1	0	2	0	0	2	6
Prince Edward Island (MacKenzie) 🔨	0	0	0	1	0	3	1	0	5

Sheet D	1	2	3	4	5	6	7	8	Final
Yukon (Williamson)	1	1	1	0	0	1	1	X	5
Northern Ontario (Robert) 🔨	0	0	0	3	4	0	0	X	7

==== Draw 17 ====
Friday, November 7, 2:00 pm

Sheet A	1	2	3	4	5	6	7	8	Final
Prince Edward Island (MacKenzie) 🔨	2	1	2	0	2	2	0	X	9
Northwest Territories (Delorey)	0	0	0	2	0	0	0	X	2

Sheet B	1	2	3	4	5	6	7	8	Final
Nunavut (Van Strien) 🔨	1	2	1	3	0	0	0	2	9
Yukon (Williamson)	0	0	0	0	4	1	1	0	6

Sheet C	1	2	3	4	5	6	7	8	Final
Alberta (Hunkin) 🔨	3	2	2	2	0	2	X	X	11
Northern Ontario (Robert)	0	0	0	0	1	0	X	X	1

== Championship pool ==
=== Standings ===
Final Championship Pool Standings

Key
Teams to Playoffs

Team	Skip	W	L	W-L	LSD
New Brunswick	Rene Comeau	9	1	1–0	768.0
Ontario	Sam Mooibroek	9	1	0–1	1065.5
Saskatchewan	Jason Ackerman	7	3	–	1170.1
Manitoba	Sean Grassie	6	4	1–0	1114.9
British Columbia	Miles Craig	6	4	0–1	1512.2
Newfoundland and Labrador	Rod Feltham	5	5	1–0	1522.4
Quebec	Yannick Martel	5	5	0–1	1040.7
Nova Scotia	Brent MacDougall	4	6	–	1416.8

=== Results ===
==== Draw 13 ====
Thursday, November 6, 12:30 pm

Sheet A	1	2	3	4	5	6	7	8	Final
Nova Scotia (MacDougall)	0	0	2	3	0	0	1	X	6
Ontario (Mooibroek) 🔨	3	4	0	0	2	2	0	X	11

Sheet B	1	2	3	4	5	6	7	8	Final
Saskatchewan (Ackerman)	1	0	2	0	0	2	0	0	5
British Columbia (Craig) 🔨	0	2	0	2	1	0	3	3	11

Sheet C	1	2	3	4	5	6	7	8	Final
New Brunswick (Comeau) 🔨	3	0	1	1	0	0	0	2	7
Quebec (Martel)	0	1	0	0	1	1	1	0	4

Sheet D	1	2	3	4	5	6	7	8	Final
Newfoundland and Labrador (Feltham) 🔨	0	0	0	1	0	1	0	X	2
Manitoba (Grassie)	1	2	1	0	4	0	1	X	9

==== Draw 15 ====
Thursday, November 6, 7:30 pm

Sheet A	1	2	3	4	5	6	7	8	Final
Quebec (Martel)	2	1	0	1	0	1	0	0	5
Manitoba (Grassie) 🔨	0	0	1	0	3	0	1	1	6

Sheet B	1	2	3	4	5	6	7	8	Final
New Brunswick (Comeau) 🔨	2	0	1	0	5	3	X	X	11
Newfoundland and Labrador (Feltham)	0	1	0	1	0	0	X	X	2

Sheet C	1	2	3	4	5	6	7	8	Final
Ontario (Mooibroek) 🔨	0	3	1	0	1	0	5	X	10
British Columbia (Craig)	2	0	0	2	0	1	0	X	5

Sheet D	1	2	3	4	5	6	7	8	Final
Nova Scotia (MacDougall)	0	0	0	1	0	1	0	X	2
Saskatchewan (Ackerman) 🔨	2	1	0	0	3	0	0	X	6

==== Draw 16 ====
Friday, November 7, 10:00 am

Sheet A	1	2	3	4	5	6	7	8	Final
Saskatchewan (Ackerman) 🔨	1	0	0	0	1	0	0	1	3
New Brunswick (Comeau)	0	1	0	1	0	1	2	0	5

Sheet B	1	2	3	4	5	6	7	8	Final
Manitoba (Grassie)	0	0	2	0	0	1	0	X	3
Ontario (Mooibroek) 🔨	3	2	0	0	2	0	2	X	9

Sheet C	1	2	3	4	5	6	7	8	Final
Newfoundland and Labrador (Feltham)	0	3	0	1	0	2	2	1	9
Nova Scotia (MacDougall) 🔨	2	0	2	0	1	0	0	0	5

Sheet D	1	2	3	4	5	6	7	8	Final
British Columbia (Craig)	1	0	0	1	0	1	1	0	4
Quebec (Martel) 🔨	0	1	1	0	1	0	0	2	5

==== Draw 18 ====
Friday, November 7, 6:00 pm

Sheet A	1	2	3	4	5	6	7	8	Final
British Columbia (Craig)	1	0	2	0	3	0	1	X	7
Newfoundland and Labrador (Feltham) 🔨	0	2	0	1	0	1	0	X	4

Sheet B	1	2	3	4	5	6	7	8	Final
Quebec (Martel)	1	1	1	0	1	0	0	2	6
Nova Scotia (MacDougall) 🔨	0	0	0	1	0	1	1	0	3

Sheet C	1	2	3	4	5	6	7	8	9	Final
Manitoba (Grassie)	2	0	1	0	0	0	0	3	0	6
Saskatchewan (Ackerman) 🔨	0	1	0	2	1	1	1	0	1	7

Sheet D	1	2	3	4	5	6	7	8	Final
Ontario (Mooibroek)	0	2	0	0	3	0	1	X	6
New Brunswick (Comeau) 🔨	1	0	5	1	0	4	0	X	11

== Playoffs ==
Semifinals
1	New Brunswick	5
4	Manitoba	3
2	Ontario	8
3	Saskatchewan	3

Final
1	New Brunswick	6
2	Ontario	5
Bronze Medal Game
4	Manitoba	3
3	Saskatchewan	8

=== Semifinals ===
Saturday, November 8, 10:00 am

Sheet B	1	2	3	4	5	6	7	8	Final
New Brunswick (Comeau) 🔨	0	3	0	0	1	0	1	0	5
Manitoba (Grassie)	0	0	0	1	0	1	0	1	3

Sheet C	1	2	3	4	5	6	7	8	Final
Ontario (Mooibroek) 🔨	2	0	3	2	0	0	1	X	8
Saskatchewan (Ackerman)	0	1	0	0	1	1	0	X	3

=== Bronze medal game ===
Saturday, November 8, 2:30 pm

Sheet C	1	2	3	4	5	6	7	8	Final
Manitoba (Grassie)	0	0	0	0	3	0	0	X	3
Saskatchewan (Ackerman) 🔨	3	1	1	1	0	1	1	X	8

=== Final ===
Saturday, November 8, 2:30 pm

Sheet B	1	2	3	4	5	6	7	8	Final
New Brunswick (Comeau) 🔨	2	0	1	0	0	2	0	1	6
Ontario (Mooibroek)	0	2	0	1	0	0	2	0	5

== Final standings ==
Place	Team
1st place, gold medalist(s)	New Brunswick
2nd place, silver medalist(s)	Ontario
3rd place, bronze medalist(s)	Saskatchewan
4	Manitoba
5	British Columbia
6	Newfoundland and Labrador
7	Quebec
8	Nova Scotia

Place	Team
9	Alberta
10	Nunavut
11	Prince Edward Island
12	Northwest Territories
13	Northern Ontario
14	Yukon
