= Alex Robichaud =

Canadian curler (born 1995)

- Curler
- Born: April 7, 1995 (age 31); Fredericton, New Brunswick

Team
- Curling club: Capital WC, Fredericton, NB
- Skip: Colten Steele
- Third: Rene Comeau
- Second: Alex Robichaud
- Lead: Cameron Sallaj
- Mixed doubles partner: Melissa Adams

Curling career
- Member Association: New Brunswick
- Top CTRS ranking: 77th (2019–20)
Medal record
Curling
Representing New Brunswick
Canadian Mixed Doubles Championship
| Bronze medal – third place | 2025 Summerside |

Alex Robichaud (born April 7, 1995) is a Canadian curler from Fredericton, New Brunswick. He currently plays second on Team Colten Steele. He also plays mixed doubles with Melissa Adams. He also coaches the Melissa Adams women's rink.

== Career ==
=== Juniors ===
Robichaud qualified for one Canadian Junior Curling Championship in 2016, skipping his own team of Ian McKinley, Donovan Lanteigne and Peter Robichaud. At the provincial championship, the team qualified through the B event before winning both the semifinal and championship games, defeating Layton MacCabe 6–5 in the final. Representing New Brunswick in Stratford, Ontario, the team went through the round robin and championship pools with an 4–6 record, finishing eighth. Also during juniors, Robichaud played second on the UNB Varsity Reds curling team that qualified for the 2015 CIS/CCA Curling Championships. There, the team, led by Josh Barry, finished in seventh with a 1–6 record.

=== Men's ===
Out of juniors, Robichaud continued skipping his own team. In both 2017 and 2018, his teams were unable to qualify for the New Brunswick Tankard, losing out in the preliminary rounds. For the 2018–19 season, he joined the Ed Cyr rink which also included front end players Chris Wagner and Alex Kyle. This team was successful in qualifying for the 2019 NB Tankard. There, they finished 4–3 in the round robin before losing to Scott Jones in a tiebreaker, eliminating them from contention. The 2019–20 season saw Robichaud reach his first World Curling Tour final, losing to Team Jones in the final of the Superstore Monctonian Challenge. Team Cyr also qualified for the playoffs at the Dave Jones Mayflower Cashspiel, losing out to Stuart Thompson. After again advancing through the prelims of the 2020 New Brunswick Tankard, the team were unable to replicate their success from the previous year, finishing seventh with a 2–5 record.

After the COVID-19 pandemic cancelled the majority of the 2020–21 season, Robichaud returned to skipping for the 2021–22 season with teammates Rene Comeau, Chris Wagner and Alex Kyle. At the 2022 New Brunswick Tankard, the team finished 2–3 in the triple knockout bracket. The following season, they slightly bettered their record with a 3–4 performance at the 2023 New Brunswick Tankard, finishing fifth. For the 2023–24 season, Comeau took over as skip with Robichaud moving to third. Trevor Crouse was also added to the team with Chris Wagner moving to alternate. This move paid off for the team as they found early success on tour, reaching the final of the PEI Brewing Company Cashspiel, the semifinals of the New Scotland Brewing Co. Cashspiel and the quarterfinals of the Jim Sullivan Curling Classic. They carried this momentum into the 2024 New Brunswick Tankard where they managed to defeat every team in the field besides eventual champion James Grattan who beat them in all three qualifying events. During the 2025 New Brunswick Tankard, the team would not be able to match their previous season's success, going 2–3.

Comeau and Robichaud would then announce that they would be joining team Colten Steele for the 2025–26 season, with Comeau playing third, Robichaud as second, and Cameron Sallaj as lead. They would have a strong start to the season, finishing second at the 2025 Steele Cup Cash event, losing to James Grattan in the final.

=== Mixed doubles ===
Robichaud began playing mixed doubles with partner Julia Hunter. This pair found early success together with trips to the Canadian Mixed Doubles Curling Championship in both 2016 and 2018. After a 1–6 finish in 2016, the team went 3–4 in 2018. Robichaud then began playing with Melissa Adams in 2018. This duo won their first World Curling Tour event in 2019 by winning the Goldline Clermont Mixed Doubles. In 2021, Adams and Robichaud finished second at the New Brunswick Mixed Doubles Curling Championship, however, would go on to represent New Brunswick at the Canadian championship after the winners Leah Thompson and Charlie Sullivan forfeited their spot due to travel requirements. At the 2021 Canadian Mixed Doubles Curling Championship, the pair finished with a 1–5 record, defeating Nunavut in their sole victory. Adams and Robichaud again won the New Brunswick championship the following year, however, did not get to go to the national championship as it was cancelled. They also won a second tour event at the Fredericton Mixed Doubles.

Despite not repeating as provincial champions in 2023, Adams and Robichaud still qualified for the 2023 Canadian Mixed Doubles Curling Championship based on their points accumulated throughout the year. At the championship, the team placed fifth in their pool with a 3–4 record. They also defended their title at the Fredericton Mixed Doubles that season and won the Goldline Mixed Doubles Rivière-du-Loup, picking up two more tour titles. The following season, the pair won back their provincial title and represented New Brunswick on home ice at the 2024 Canadian Mixed Doubles Curling Championship where they finished with a 2–5 record.

To begin the 2024–25 season, Adams and Robichaud reached the final of the Goldline Omnium Services Financiers Richard April, losing to Marlee Powers and Luke Saunders. In December, the team competed in the Rocky Mountain Mixed Doubles Classic which doubled as the final Olympic Trials direct-entry qualifier. There, the team had a strong run, qualifying for the playoffs through the B side before losing to Jennifer Jones and Brent Laing in the quarterfinals. Despite this, their finish gave them enough points to qualify for the 2025 Canadian Mixed Doubles Curling Olympic Trials, becoming the first mixed doubles team with both players from New Brunswick to do so. There, they finished seventh in their pool with a 2–5 record. Adams and Robichaud also qualified for the 2025 Canadian Mixed Doubles Curling Championship, where they had success, finishing tied for 3rd after losing to Powers and Saunders 5–4 in the semifinals.

=== Mixed Team ===
Robichaud would also represent New Brunswick at the 2025 Canadian Mixed Curling Championship as the second on a team skipped by Rene Comeau, alongside Jennifer Fenwick, and Katie Vandenborre. At the 2025 Canadian Mixed, they would win their first national championship, beating Ontario's Sam Mooibroek 6–5 in the final, qualifying to represent Canada at the 2026 World Mixed Curling Championship.

== Personal life ==
Robichaud is Acadian, and employed as a communications director at the Office of the Lieutenant Governor of New Brunswick. He previously attended the University of New Brunswick.

== Teams ==
| Season | Skip | Third | Second | Lead |
|---|---|---|---|---|
| 2013–14 | Daniel Prest | Will Lautenschlager | Alex Robichaud | Ian McKinley |
| 2014–15 | Andrew Smith | Scott Archibald | Alex Robichaud | Stephen Muzzerall |
| 2015–16 | Alex Robichaud | Ian McKinley | Donovan Lanteigne | Peter Robichaud |
| 2016–17 | Alex Robichaud | Jesse Arseneau | David Hunter | Alex Sutherland |
| 2017–18 | Alex Robichaud | Ian McKinley | David Hunter | Chris Jenkins |
| 2018–19 | Ed Cyr | Alex Robichaud | Chris Wagner | Alex Kyle |
| 2019–20 | Ed Cyr | Alex Robichaud | Chris Wagner | Alex Kyle |
| 2021–22 | Alex Robichaud | Rene Comeau | Chris Wagner | Alex Kyle |
| 2022–23 | Alex Robichaud | Rene Comeau | Chris Wagner | Alex Kyle |
| 2023–24 | Rene Comeau | Alex Robichaud | Trevor Crouse | Alex Kyle |
| 2024–25 | Rene Comeau | Alex Robichaud | Trevor Crouse | Alex Kyle |
| 2025–26 | Colten Steele | Rene Comeau | Alex Robichaud | Cameron Sallaj |
