= 2022 New Brunswick Tankard =

- Host city: Miramichi, New Brunswick
- Arena: Miramichi Curling Club
- Dates: February 9–13
- Winner: Team Grattan
- Curling club: Gage Golf & CC, Oromocto
- Skip: James Grattan
- Third: Darren Moulding
- Second: Paul Dobson
- Lead: Andy McCann
- Alternate: Jamie Brannen
- Finalist: Zach Eldridge

The 2022 New Brunswick Tankard, the provincial men's curling championship for New Brunswick, was held from February 9 to 13 at the Miramichi Curling Club in Miramichi, New Brunswick. The winning James Grattan team represented New Brunswick at the 2022 Tim Hortons Brier, Canada's national men's curling championship in Lethbridge, Alberta.

Unlike previous seasons, there was no preliminary round to qualify eight teams for the provincial championship. Any team was able to register to compete in the championship.

== Teams ==
The teams are listed as follows:

| Skip | Third | Second | Lead | Alternate | Club |
|---|---|---|---|---|---|
| Dan Crouse | Sam Forestell | David DeAdder | Mike Allain | | Curl Moncton, Moncton |
| Zach Eldridge | Chris Jeffrey | Ronnie Burgess | Brody Hanson | | Capital Winter Club, Fredericton |
| James Grattan | Darren Moulding | Paul Dobson | Andy McCann | Jamie Brannen | Gage Golf & Curling Club, Oromocto |
| Jeremy Mallais (Fourth) | Scott Jones (Skip) | Brian King | Jared Bezanson | Chris Medford | Curl Moncton, Moncton |
| Mike Kennedy | Jordan Pinder | Grant Odishaw | Vance LeCocq | | Grand Falls Curling Club, Grand Falls |
| Adam MacDonald | Trevor Hanson | Daniel Lister | Chris Cogswell | | Gage Golf & Curling Club, Oromocto |
| Josh Nowlan | Alex Peasley | Wil Robertson | Jacob Nowlan | | Curl Moncton, Moncton |
| Alex Robichaud | Rene Comeau | Chris Wagner | Alex Kyle | Charlie Sullivan | Capital Winter Club, Fredericton |
| Jack Smeltzer | Michael Donovan | Trevor Crouse | Mitchell Small | | Capital Winter Club, Fredericton |
| Wayne Tallon | Chris Schnare | Stephen Muzzerall | Steven Burns | | Capital Winter Club, Fredericton |

== Knockout brackets ==
=== A event ===
First Knockout | Qualifier 1
Josh Nowlan | 3
Alex Robichaud | 6
Alex Robichaud | 5
James Grattan | 8
James Grattan | 8
Zach Eldridge | 9 | Zach Eldridge | 7
Adam MacDonald | 5 | James Grattan | 9
Jack Smeltzer | 5
Scott Jones | 11
Dan Crouse | 6
Scott Jones | 4
Jack Smeltzer | 7
Jack Smeltzer | 9
Mike Kennedy | 10 | Mike Kennedy | 3
Wayne Tallon | 4

=== B event ===
Second Knockout | Qualifier 2
Jack Smeltzer | 8
Alex Robichaud | 6
Alex Robichaud | 9
Mike Kennedy | 4
Mike Kennedy | 11
Adam MacDonald | 7 | Dan Crouse | 4
Dan Crouse | 9 | Jack Smeltzer | 1
Zach Eldridge | 11
James Grattan | 8
Zach Eldridge | 9
Scott Jones | 7
Zach Eldridge | 8
Zach Eldridge | 5
Wayne Tallon | 7 | Wayne Tallon | 4
Josh Nowlan | 5

=== C event ===
Third Knockout | Qualifier 3
Jack Smeltzer | 1
James Grattan | 9
James Grattan | 8
Adam MacDonald | 3
Mike Kennedy | 8
Adam MacDonald | 7 | Adam MacDonald | 9
Wayne Tallon | 4 | James Grattan | 8
Scott Jones | 2
Zach Eldridge | 5
Scott Jones | 6
Alex Robichaud | 3
Scott Jones | 9
Scott Jones | 9
Josh Nowlan | 7 | Josh Nowlan | 1
Dan Crouse | 3

== Knockout results ==
All draw times listed in Atlantic Time (UTC−04:00).

=== Draw 1 ===
Wednesday, February 9, 2:30 pm

| Sheet 2 | 1 | 2 | 3 | 4 | 5 | 6 | 7 | 8 | 9 | 10 | Final |
|---|---|---|---|---|---|---|---|---|---|---|---|
| Zach Eldridge | 1 | 0 | 0 | 1 | 1 | 3 | 0 | 0 | 3 | X | 9 |
| Adam MacDonald 🔨 | 0 | 2 | 0 | 0 | 0 | 0 | 2 | 1 | 0 | X | 5 |

| Sheet 3 | 1 | 2 | 3 | 4 | 5 | 6 | 7 | 8 | 9 | 10 | Final |
|---|---|---|---|---|---|---|---|---|---|---|---|
| Mike Kennedy 🔨 | 0 | 1 | 0 | 3 | 3 | 2 | 0 | 1 | X | X | 10 |
| Wayne Tallon | 0 | 0 | 2 | 0 | 0 | 0 | 2 | 0 | X | X | 4 |

| Sheet 4 | 1 | 2 | 3 | 4 | 5 | 6 | 7 | 8 | 9 | 10 | Final |
|---|---|---|---|---|---|---|---|---|---|---|---|
| Josh Nowlan 🔨 | 0 | 1 | 0 | 0 | 1 | 0 | 0 | 0 | 1 | X | 3 |
| Alex Robichaud | 0 | 0 | 1 | 0 | 0 | 1 | 1 | 3 | 0 | X | 6 |

| Sheet 5 | 1 | 2 | 3 | 4 | 5 | 6 | 7 | 8 | 9 | 10 | Final |
|---|---|---|---|---|---|---|---|---|---|---|---|
| Scott Jones 🔨 | 0 | 2 | 0 | 3 | 2 | 0 | 1 | 0 | 3 | X | 11 |
| Dan Crouse | 1 | 0 | 2 | 0 | 0 | 2 | 0 | 1 | 0 | X | 6 |

=== Draw 2 ===
Wednesday, February 9, 7:30 pm

| Sheet 2 | 1 | 2 | 3 | 4 | 5 | 6 | 7 | 8 | 9 | 10 | Final |
|---|---|---|---|---|---|---|---|---|---|---|---|
| Wayne Tallon 🔨 | 2 | 0 | 2 | 0 | 0 | 0 | 0 | 1 | 0 | 2 | 7 |
| Josh Nowlan | 0 | 2 | 0 | 0 | 2 | 0 | 1 | 0 | 0 | 0 | 5 |

| Sheet 3 | 1 | 2 | 3 | 4 | 5 | 6 | 7 | 8 | 9 | 10 | Final |
|---|---|---|---|---|---|---|---|---|---|---|---|
| Adam MacDonald 🔨 | 0 | 1 | 0 | 2 | 0 | 0 | 2 | 2 | 0 | X | 7 |
| Dan Crouse | 2 | 0 | 2 | 0 | 1 | 1 | 0 | 0 | 3 | X | 9 |

| Sheet 4 | 1 | 2 | 3 | 4 | 5 | 6 | 7 | 8 | 9 | 10 | Final |
|---|---|---|---|---|---|---|---|---|---|---|---|
| James Grattan | 0 | 2 | 0 | 0 | 1 | 0 | 2 | 0 | 2 | 1 | 8 |
| Zach Eldridge 🔨 | 2 | 0 | 2 | 2 | 0 | 0 | 0 | 1 | 0 | 0 | 7 |

| Sheet 5 | 1 | 2 | 3 | 4 | 5 | 6 | 7 | 8 | 9 | 10 | Final |
|---|---|---|---|---|---|---|---|---|---|---|---|
| Jack Smeltzer 🔨 | 1 | 0 | 0 | 3 | 1 | 0 | 4 | X | X | X | 9 |
| Mike Kennedy | 0 | 1 | 1 | 0 | 0 | 1 | 0 | X | X | X | 3 |

=== Draw 3 ===
Thursday, February 10, 9:30 am

| Sheet 2 | 1 | 2 | 3 | 4 | 5 | 6 | 7 | 8 | 9 | 10 | Final |
|---|---|---|---|---|---|---|---|---|---|---|---|
| Mike Kennedy | 0 | 3 | 0 | 2 | 0 | 3 | 0 | 3 | X | X | 11 |
| Dan Crouse 🔨 | 1 | 0 | 1 | 0 | 1 | 0 | 1 | 0 | X | X | 4 |

| Sheet 3 | 1 | 2 | 3 | 4 | 5 | 6 | 7 | 8 | 9 | 10 | Final |
|---|---|---|---|---|---|---|---|---|---|---|---|
| Zach Eldridge | 0 | 1 | 1 | 0 | 0 | 0 | 0 | 2 | 0 | 1 | 5 |
| Wayne Tallon 🔨 | 1 | 0 | 0 | 1 | 0 | 1 | 0 | 0 | 1 | 0 | 4 |

| Sheet 4 | 1 | 2 | 3 | 4 | 5 | 6 | 7 | 8 | 9 | 10 | Final |
|---|---|---|---|---|---|---|---|---|---|---|---|
| Scott Jones | 1 | 2 | 0 | 0 | 0 | 0 | 0 | 1 | 0 | X | 4 |
| Jack Smeltzer 🔨 | 0 | 0 | 1 | 0 | 2 | 1 | 1 | 0 | 2 | X | 7 |

| Sheet 5 | 1 | 2 | 3 | 4 | 5 | 6 | 7 | 8 | 9 | 10 | Final |
|---|---|---|---|---|---|---|---|---|---|---|---|
| Alex Robichaud | 0 | 1 | 1 | 0 | 0 | 0 | 3 | 0 | 0 | 0 | 5 |
| James Grattan 🔨 | 1 | 0 | 0 | 1 | 1 | 1 | 0 | 1 | 1 | 2 | 8 |

=== Draw 4 ===
Thursday, February 10, 2:30 pm

| Sheet 3 | 1 | 2 | 3 | 4 | 5 | 6 | 7 | 8 | 9 | 10 | Final |
|---|---|---|---|---|---|---|---|---|---|---|---|
| James Grattan 🔨 | 4 | 0 | 0 | 1 | 0 | 3 | 0 | 1 | X | X | 9 |
| Jack Smeltzer | 0 | 2 | 0 | 0 | 1 | 0 | 2 | 0 | X | X | 5 |

| Sheet 4 | 1 | 2 | 3 | 4 | 5 | 6 | 7 | 8 | 9 | 10 | Final |
|---|---|---|---|---|---|---|---|---|---|---|---|
| Alex Robichaud | 0 | 3 | 0 | 0 | 6 | 0 | X | X | X | X | 9 |
| Mike Kennedy 🔨 | 1 | 0 | 2 | 0 | 0 | 1 | X | X | X | X | 4 |

| Sheet 5 | 1 | 2 | 3 | 4 | 5 | 6 | 7 | 8 | 9 | 10 | Final |
|---|---|---|---|---|---|---|---|---|---|---|---|
| Scott Jones 🔨 | 4 | 0 | 1 | 0 | 1 | 0 | 0 | 0 | 1 | 0 | 7 |
| Zach Eldridge | 0 | 4 | 0 | 1 | 0 | 0 | 1 | 1 | 0 | 1 | 8 |

=== Draw 5 ===
Thursday, February 10, 7:30 pm

| Sheet 2 | 1 | 2 | 3 | 4 | 5 | 6 | 7 | 8 | 9 | 10 | Final |
|---|---|---|---|---|---|---|---|---|---|---|---|
| Adam MacDonald 🔨 | 1 | 0 | 2 | 1 | 1 | 0 | 0 | 1 | 1 | X | 7 |
| Wayne Tallon | 0 | 1 | 0 | 0 | 0 | 1 | 2 | 0 | 0 | X | 4 |

| Sheet 3 | 1 | 2 | 3 | 4 | 5 | 6 | 7 | 8 | 9 | 10 | Final |
|---|---|---|---|---|---|---|---|---|---|---|---|
| Josh Nowlan | 0 | 0 | 2 | 0 | 0 | 1 | 0 | 1 | 2 | 1 | 7 |
| Dan Crouse 🔨 | 1 | 0 | 0 | 1 | 1 | 0 | 0 | 0 | 0 | 0 | 3 |

=== Draw 6 ===
Friday, February 11, 1:30 pm

| Sheet 2 | 1 | 2 | 3 | 4 | 5 | 6 | 7 | 8 | 9 | 10 | 11 | Final |
|---|---|---|---|---|---|---|---|---|---|---|---|---|
| James Grattan 🔨 | 2 | 0 | 0 | 3 | 0 | 1 | 0 | 1 | 0 | 1 | 0 | 8 |
| Zach Eldridge | 0 | 2 | 1 | 0 | 2 | 0 | 1 | 0 | 2 | 0 | 1 | 9 |

| Sheet 3 | 1 | 2 | 3 | 4 | 5 | 6 | 7 | 8 | 9 | 10 | Final |
|---|---|---|---|---|---|---|---|---|---|---|---|
| Mike Kennedy | 0 | 4 | 1 | 0 | 1 | 0 | 2 | 0 | 0 | 0 | 8 |
| Adam MacDonald 🔨 | 4 | 0 | 0 | 1 | 0 | 1 | 0 | 1 | 1 | 1 | 9 |

| Sheet 4 | 1 | 2 | 3 | 4 | 5 | 6 | 7 | 8 | 9 | 10 | Final |
|---|---|---|---|---|---|---|---|---|---|---|---|
| Scott Jones | 0 | 1 | 1 | 0 | 2 | 3 | 2 | X | X | X | 9 |
| Josh Nowlan 🔨 | 0 | 0 | 0 | 1 | 0 | 0 | 0 | X | X | X | 1 |

| Sheet 5 | 1 | 2 | 3 | 4 | 5 | 6 | 7 | 8 | 9 | 10 | Final |
|---|---|---|---|---|---|---|---|---|---|---|---|
| Jack Smeltzer 🔨 | 1 | 1 | 0 | 1 | 0 | 1 | 0 | 3 | 0 | 1 | 8 |
| Alex Robichaud | 0 | 0 | 2 | 0 | 1 | 0 | 1 | 0 | 2 | 0 | 6 |

=== Draw 7 ===
Friday, February 11, 6:30 pm

| Sheet 2 | 1 | 2 | 3 | 4 | 5 | 6 | 7 | 8 | 9 | 10 | Final |
|---|---|---|---|---|---|---|---|---|---|---|---|
| Alex Robichaud | 1 | 0 | 1 | 0 | 0 | 1 | 0 | X | X | X | 3 |
| Scott Jones 🔨 | 0 | 2 | 0 | 2 | 2 | 0 | 3 | X | X | X | 9 |

| Sheet 3 | 1 | 2 | 3 | 4 | 5 | 6 | 7 | 8 | 9 | 10 | Final |
|---|---|---|---|---|---|---|---|---|---|---|---|
| Jack Smeltzer | 0 | 0 | 1 | 0 | 0 | 0 | X | X | X | X | 1 |
| Zach Eldridge 🔨 | 0 | 2 | 0 | 3 | 1 | 5 | X | X | X | X | 11 |

| Sheet 4 | 1 | 2 | 3 | 4 | 5 | 6 | 7 | 8 | 9 | 10 | Final |
|---|---|---|---|---|---|---|---|---|---|---|---|
| James Grattan 🔨 | 3 | 0 | 2 | 0 | 0 | 0 | 1 | 0 | 2 | X | 8 |
| Adam MacDonald | 0 | 2 | 0 | 1 | 0 | 0 | 0 | 0 | 0 | X | 3 |

=== Draw 8 ===
Saturday, February 12, 1:30 pm

| Sheet 2 | 1 | 2 | 3 | 4 | 5 | 6 | 7 | 8 | 9 | 10 | Final |
|---|---|---|---|---|---|---|---|---|---|---|---|
| Jack Smeltzer | 0 | 0 | 0 | 0 | 1 | 0 | X | X | X | X | 1 |
| James Grattan 🔨 | 0 | 3 | 3 | 2 | 0 | 1 | X | X | X | X | 9 |

| Sheet 4 | 1 | 2 | 3 | 4 | 5 | 6 | 7 | 8 | 9 | 10 | 11 | Final |
|---|---|---|---|---|---|---|---|---|---|---|---|---|
| Zach Eldridge | 0 | 0 | 0 | 1 | 0 | 1 | 0 | 1 | 0 | 2 | 0 | 5 |
| Scott Jones 🔨 | 0 | 0 | 2 | 0 | 1 | 0 | 1 | 0 | 1 | 0 | 1 | 6 |

=== Draw 9 ===
Saturday, February 12, 6:30 pm

| Sheet 3 | 1 | 2 | 3 | 4 | 5 | 6 | 7 | 8 | 9 | 10 | Final |
|---|---|---|---|---|---|---|---|---|---|---|---|
| James Grattan 🔨 | 0 | 3 | 0 | 2 | 1 | 1 | 0 | 1 | X | X | 8 |
| Scott Jones | 0 | 0 | 1 | 0 | 0 | 0 | 1 | 0 | X | X | 2 |

== Playoffs ==
- Team Grattan had to be beaten twice.

| Semifinal | | | Final |
| | | | A | James Grattan |
| B | Zach Eldridge | 5 | C | James Grattan |
| C | James Grattan | 8 |

=== Semifinal ===
Sunday, February 13, 9:30 am

| Sheet 4 | 1 | 2 | 3 | 4 | 5 | 6 | 7 | 8 | 9 | 10 | Final |
|---|---|---|---|---|---|---|---|---|---|---|---|
| Zach Eldridge | 0 | 0 | 1 | 0 | 0 | 2 | 0 | 1 | 1 | X | 5 |
| James Grattan 🔨 | 2 | 0 | 0 | 2 | 2 | 0 | 2 | 0 | 0 | X | 8 |

=== Final ===
Not necessary

2022 New Brunswick Tankard

James Grattan
14th New Brunswick Provincial Championship title
