= Ryan Sherrard =

Canadian-German curler (born 1986)

- Curler
- Born: September 21, 1986 (age 40); Rothesay, New Brunswick, Canada

Team
- Curling club: EC Oberstdorf, Oberstdorf, GER

Curling career
- World Championship: 3 (2017, 2018, 2019)
- European Championship: 3 (2016, 2017, 2018)
Medal record
Men's curling
Representing New Brunswick
Canada Winter Games
Silver medal – second place	2003 Bathurst

Ryan Sherrard (born September 21, 1986, in Rothesay, New Brunswick or Saint John, New Brunswick) is a Canadian-German curler living in Munich. He is originally from Quispamsis, New Brunswick.

He currently coaches the Marc Muskatewitz team.

== Career ==
=== Juniors ===
As a junior curler, Sherrard won three provincial junior titles in his native New Brunswick. His first was in 2003, throwing fourth stones for a team skipped by Daniel Sherrard (no relation). The team represented New Brunswick at the 2003 Canadian Junior Curling Championships, where they finished with a 6–6 round-robin record, missing the playoffs.

The next season, Sherrard won another provincial junior title, this time skipping a team which also consisted of Jason Roach, Darren Roach and Jared Bezanson. The team played in the 2004 Canadian Junior Curling Championships, where they made the playoffs after posting a 9–3 round-robin record, tied with two other teams for first place. In the playoffs, they beat Manitoba's Daley Peters rink in the semifinal and then Newfoundland and Labrador's Matthew Blandford team to claim the championship. The team then went on to represent Canada at the 2004 World Junior Curling Championships. There, the team finished with a 5–4 round-robin record, tied with South Korea's Kim Soo-hyuk for fourth place. They lost to the Korean team in a tiebreaker.

Sherrard along with Jason and Darren Roach and Bezanson won the New Brunswick junior title again in 2005, qualifying them to represent their province at the 2005 Canadian Junior Curling Championships. The team could not defend their title however, finishing the round-robin out of the playoffs with a 5–7 record.

Sherrard also represented New Brunswick at the 2003 Canada Winter Games in Bathurst, New Brunswick, where the team (skipped by Daniel Sherrard) captured the silver medal.

=== Men's ===
After juniors, Sherrard played a few more seasons in New Brunswick, skipping rinks at the New Brunswick provincial men's championship in 2008 (4–3) and 2010 (5–2; lost tiebreaker).

Sherrard later moved to Germany to study, taking a few years off from curling. In 2016 he went with a friend to the world championships in Basel and was introduced to the German team there, he was later asked to join the German national team as an alternate to replace an injured player. He played for the team (skipped by Andy Kapp) at the 2016 European Curling Championships, playing in five games in total. The team finished 4–5, good enough for fifth place overall. Kapp left the team that season, and Sherrard was promoted to play lead on the team, now skipped by Alexander Baumann who had been throwing fourth stones. The team represented Germany at the 2017 Ford World Men's Curling Championship, finishing with a 3–8 record, in 10th place, and again at the 2018 Worlds.

== Personal life ==
Sherrard studied biochemistry at Mount Allison University, then completed his Ph.D. in Biology at LMU Munich, and currently works as an e-commerce consultant.
