= 2010 Alexander Keith's Tankard =

- Host city: Moncton, New Brunswick
- Arena: Curling Beauséjour
- Dates: February 3–7
- Winner: Team Grattan
- Curling club: Gage G&CC, Oromocto
- Skip: James Grattan
- Third: Steven Howard
- Second: Jason Vaughan
- Lead: Peter Case
- Alternate: Bobby Vaughan
- Finalist: Terry Odishaw

The 2010 Alexander Keith's Tankard, the provincial men's curling championship for New Brunswick was held from February 3 to 7 at Curling Beauséjour in Moncton, New Brunswick. The winning James Grattan represented New Brunswick at the 2010 Tim Hortons Brier in Halifax, Nova Scotia.

== Teams ==
The teams are listed as follows:

Skip	Third	Second	Lead	Alternate	Club
Paul Dobson	Geoff Porter	Ryan Porter	Mark Dobson		Carleton CC, Saint John
James Grattan	Steven Howard	Jason Vaughan	Peter Case	Bobby Vaughan	Gage G&CC, Oromocto
Trevor Hanson	Robert Daley	Zack Eldridge	Sean Gibson		Capital WC, Fredericton
Andy McCann	Scott Jones (skip)	Brian King	Pierre Fraser		Beaver CC, Moncton
Terry Odishaw	Mike Flemming	Paul Nason	Jeremy Mallais	Roger Nason	Curling Beauséjour, Moncton
Rick Perron	Grant Odishaw	Marc LeCocq	Jeff Lacey		Beaver CC, Moncton
Ryan Sherrard	Jason Roach	Darren Roach	Jared Bezanson		Riverside G&CC, Rothesay
Jim Sullivan	Charlie Sullivan, Jr.	Kevin Boyle	Spencer Mawhinney		Riverside G&CC, Rothesay

== Round Robin standings ==
Final Round Robin standings

Key
Teams to Playoffs
Teams to Tiebreaker

Skip	W	L	W–L	PF	PA
Terry Odishaw	6	1	–	48	35
Rick Perron	5	2	2–0	44	32
James Grattan	5	2	1–1	52	43
Ryan Sherrard	5	2	0–2	39	34
Scott Jones	4	3	–	48	44
Paul Dobson	1	6	1–1	35	43
Trevor Hanson	1	6	1–1	34	46
Jim Sullivan	1	6	1–1	33	52

== Round Robin results ==
All draw times listed in Atlantic Time (UTC−04:00).

=== Draw 1 ===
Wednesday, February 3, 7:00 pm

Team	Final
Ryan Sherrard	7
Scott Jones	5

Team	Final
Rick Perron	9
Paul Dobson	3

Team	Final
Jim Sullivan	9
Trevor Hanson	4

Team	Final
James Grattan	4
Terry Odishaw	8

=== Draw 2 ===
Thursday, February 4, 9:00 am

Team	Final
Paul Dobson	8
James Grattan	10

Team	Final
Scott Jones	9
Jim Sullivan	8

Team	Final
Terry Odishaw	7
Rick Perron	5

Team	Final
Trevor Hanson	5
Ryan Sherrard	6

=== Draw 3 ===
Thursday, February 4, 2:00 pm

Team	Final
Rick Perron	7
Trevor Hanson	5

Team	Final
Ryan Sherrard	7
Terry Odishaw	5

Team	Final
James Grattan	8
Scott Jones	7

Team	Final
Jim Sullivan	4
Paul Dobson	7

=== Draw 4 ===
Thursday, February 4, 8:00 pm

Team	Final
Jim Sullivan	5
Terry Odishaw	9

Team	Final
Trevor Hanson	6
James Grattan	9

Team	Final
Ryan Sherrard	5
Paul Dobson	4

Team	Final
Scott Jones	9
Rick Perron	5

=== Draw 5 ===
Friday, February 5, 2:00 pm

Team	Final
Paul Dobson	5
Scott Jones	6

Team	Final
Rick Perron	6
Ryan Sherrard	4

Team	Final
James Grattan	11
Jim Sullivan	4

Team	Final
Terry Odishaw	5
Trevor Hanson	4

=== Draw 6 ===
Friday, February 5, 7:00 pm

Team	Final
Rick Perron	4
Jim Sullivan	1

Team	Final
Paul Dobson	2
Trevor Hanson	6

Team	Final
Scott Jones	4
Terry Odishaw	7

Team	Final
Ryan Sherrard	2
James Grattan	7

=== Draw 7 ===
Saturday, February 6, 9:00 am

Team	Final
Terry Odishaw	7
Paul Dobson	6

Team	Final
James Grattan	3
Rick Perron	8

Team	Final
Jim Sullivan	2
Ryan Sherrard	8

Team	Final
Trevor Hanson	4
Scott Jones	8

== Tiebreaker ==
Saturday, February 6, 2:00 pm

Team	Final
James Grattan	6
Ryan Sherrard	3

== Playoffs ==
Semifinal			Final
			1	Terry Odishaw	3
2	Rick Perron	5	3	James Grattan	6
3	James Grattan	6

=== Semifinal ===
Saturday, February 6, 8:00 pm

Team	1	2	3	4	5	6	7	8	9	10	Final
Rick Perron 🔨	1	0	0	1	0	1	1	1	0	0	5
James Grattan	0	1	0	0	3	0	0	0	1	1	6

=== Final ===
Sunday, February 7, 2:00 pm

Team	1	2	3	4	5	6	7	8	9	10	Final
Terry Odishaw 🔨	1	0	0	1	0	1	0	0	0	X	3
James Grattan	0	2	1	0	1	0	0	2	0	X	6

2010 Alexander Keith's Tankard

James Grattan
8th New Brunswick Provincial Championship title
