= 2003 Canadian Junior Curling Championships =

- Host city: Ottawa, Ontario
- Arena: Rideau Curling Club and Ottawa Curling Club
- Dates: February 1–9
- Men's winner: Saskatchewan
- Curling club: Sutherland CC, Saskatoon
- Skip: Steve Laycock
- Third: Christopher Haichert
- Second: Michael Jantzen
- Lead: Kyler Broad
- Coach: Barry Fiendell
- Finalist: Alberta
- Women's winner: Saskatchewan
- Curling club: Nutana CC, Saskatoon
- Skip: Marliese Miller
- Third: Teejay Surik
- Second: Janelle Lemon
- Lead: Chelsey Bell
- Coach: Bob Miller
- Finalist: Nova Scotia

The 2003 Kärcher Canadian Junior Curling Championships were held February 1–9 at the Rideau and Ottawa Curling Clubs in Ottawa. Teams from Saskatoon, Saskatchewan won both the men's and women's event. Both teams would go on to win gold medals for Canada at the 2003 World Junior Curling Championships. The men's event was won by the Steve Laycock rink from the Sutherland Curling Club, while the women's event was won by the Marliese Miller (now Kasner) rink from the Nutana Curling Club.

== Men's ==
=== Teams ===
Province / Territory	Skip	Third	Second	Lead	Club
Alberta	Darren Moulding	Brock Virtue	Matt Taylor	Nicolas Virtue	North Hill Community Curling Club, Calgary
British Columbia	Jason Montgomery	Cliff Carr-Hilton	Miles Craig	Will Duggan	Kerry Park Curling Club, Mill Bay
Manitoba	Reid Carruthers	Adam Walker	Tyler Forrest	Daniel Fillion	Pembina Curling Club, Winnipeg
New Brunswick	Ryan Sherrard	Daniel Sherrard (skip)	Christopher Bessey	Jared Bezanson	Riverside Country Club, Saint John
Newfoundland and Labrador	Matthew Blandford	Alan Hamilton	Andrew Mercer	Tim Norman	St. John's Curling Club, St. John's
Northern Ontario	Colin Koivula	Justin McCarville	Chris Briand	David Carr	Port Arthur Curling Club, Thunder Bay
Northwest Territories	Trevor Moss	Chris Kelln	Matthew Green	Rob Borden	Yellowknife Curling Club, Yellowknife
Nova Scotia	Kevin Saccary	Scott Saccary	Jared Bent	Luke Johnson	Mayflower Curling Club, Halifax
Ontario	Mark Bice	Mike Callan	Rob Pruliere	Jeff Wilson	Sarnia Golf & Curling Club, Sarnia
Prince Edward Island	Tyler MacKenzie	Steven vanOuwerkerk	Matthew Piercey	Ryan Piercey	Cornwall Curling Club, Cornwall
Quebec	Martin Crete	Jonathan Tremblay	Kevin White	Olivier Leclerc	Club de curling Jacques-Cartier, Sillery & Club de curling Victoria, Sainte-Foy
Saskatchewan	Steve Laycock	Christopher Haichert	Michael Jantzen	Kyler Broad	Sutherland Curling Club, Saskatoon
Yukon	Kyle Gee	James Babcock	Dustin Mikkelsen	Wes Klippert	Whitehorse Curling Club, Whitehorse

=== Standings ===
Province / Territory	W	L
Saskatchewan	11	1
Quebec	9	3
Alberta	8	4
British Columbia	8	4
Ontario	7	5
Prince Edward Island	7	5
Northern Ontario	6	6
New Brunswick	6	6
Nova Scotia	5	7
Newfoundland and Labrador	4	8
Manitoba	4	8
Northwest Territories	2	10
Yukon	1	11

=== Results ===
Draw 1

Sheet A	1	2	3	4	5	6	7	8	9	10	Final
Nova Scotia (Saccary) 🔨	0	0	2	0	2	0	2	0	0	1	7
Newfoundland and Labrador (Blandford)	0	1	0	2	0	1	0	1	1	0	6

Sheet C	1	2	3	4	5	6	7	8	9	10	11	Final
Prince Edward Island (MacKenzie) 🔨	0	0	0	2	0	0	1	0	2	0	1	6
Quebec (Crete)	0	0	1	0	2	0	0	0	0	2	0	5

Sheet E	1	2	3	4	5	6	7	8	9	10	Final
New Brunswick (Sherrard) 🔨	0	0	2	0	1	0	1	0	0	X	4
Ontario (Bice)	1	0	0	2	0	2	0	2	3	X	10

Sheet H	1	2	3	4	5	6	7	8	9	10	Final
Northwest Territories (Moss) 🔨	0	0	1	0	0	1	0	1	0	X	3
Saskatchewan (Laycock)	1	1	0	0	3	0	1	0	1	X	7

Sheet J	1	2	3	4	5	6	7	8	9	10	Final
Yukon (Gee) 🔨	3	0	0	1	1	0	0	1	0	0	6
Manitoba (Carruthers)	0	0	3	0	0	0	3	0	1	2	9

Draw 2

Sheet D	1	2	3	4	5	6	7	8	9	10	Final
Northern Ontario (Koivula) 🔨	0	3	0	0	2	0	3	0	1	X	9
British Columbia (Montgomery)	0	0	1	0	0	1	0	1	0	X	3

Sheet G	1	2	3	4	5	6	7	8	9	10	Final
Saskatchewan (Laycock) 🔨	0	0	0	1	0	0	3	3	0	X	7
Nova Scotia (Saccary)	1	1	0	0	1	0	0	0	1	X	4

Sheet I	1	2	3	4	5	6	7	8	9	10	Final
Quebec (Crete) 🔨	1	0	1	0	1	0	0	2	0	1	6
Alberta (Moulding)	0	1	0	0	0	1	1	0	1	0	4

Draw 3

Sheet B	1	2	3	4	5	6	7	8	9	10	Final
Alberta (Moulding) 🔨	4	0	2	0	1	0	3	0	X	X	10
Northwest Territories (Moss)	0	1	0	2	0	1	0	1	X	X	5

Sheet C	1	2	3	4	5	6	7	8	9	10	Final
Newfoundland and Labrador (Blandford) 🔨	1	0	2	0	4	0	1	0	X	X	8
Yukon (Gee)	0	1	0	1	0	1	0	0	X	X	3

Sheet F	1	2	3	4	5	6	7	8	9	10	Final
British Columbia (Montgomery) 🔨	2	0	2	1	2	0	0	1	X	X	8
Prince Edward Island (MacKenzie)	0	2	0	0	0	1	0	0	X	X	3

Sheet H	1	2	3	4	5	6	7	8	9	10	Final
Manitoba (Carruthers) 🔨	0	1	0	1	0	0	X	X	X	X	2
New Brunswick (Sherrard)	0	0	1	0	5	2	X	X	X	X	8

Sheet I	1	2	3	4	5	6	7	8	9	10	Final
Ontario (Bice) 🔨	1	0	1	1	0	1	2	0	2	X	8
Northern Ontario (Koivula)	0	0	0	0	1	0	0	1	0	X	2

Draw 4

Sheet A	1	2	3	4	5	6	7	8	9	10	Final
Alberta (Moulding) 🔨	2	0	0	2	0	3	0	0	2	X	9
New Brunswick (Sherrard)	0	0	1	0	2	0	1	0	0	X	4

Sheet D	1	2	3	4	5	6	7	8	9	10	Final
Newfoundland and Labrador (Blandford) 🔨	1	0	1	0	2	0	0	2	2	X	8
Prince Edward Island (MacKenzie)	0	1	0	0	0	0	1	0	0	X	2

Sheet G	1	2	3	4	5	6	7	8	9	10	Final
Ontario (Bice) 🔨	0	3	0	0	0	1	1	0	0	X	5
Saskatchewan (Laycock)	1	0	1	1	2	0	0	2	2	X	9

Sheet I	1	2	3	4	5	6	7	8	9	10	Final
Nova Scotia (Saccary) 🔨	2	0	1	0	0	0	1	0	0	X	4
British Columbia (Montgomery)	0	0	0	1	2	1	0	0	2	X	6

Draw 5

Sheet A	1	2	3	4	5	6	7	8	9	10	Final
Yukon (Gee) 🔨	1	0	0	0	0	0	0	0	X	X	1
Quebec (Crete)	0	0	1	1	2	0	1	2	X	X	7

Sheet C	1	2	3	4	5	6	7	8	9	10	Final
Manitoba (Carruthers) 🔨	0	0	2	0	0	0	0	X	X	X	2
Alberta (Moulding)	0	1	0	2	2	1	1	X	X	X	7

Sheet H	1	2	3	4	5	6	7	8	9	10	Final
Northern Ontario (Koivula) 🔨	0	1	0	2	1	1	0	2	1	X	8
Nova Scotia (Saccary)	0	0	1	0	0	0	2	0	0	X	3

Sheet I	1	2	3	4	5	6	7	8	9	10	Final
Northwest Territories (Moss) 🔨	0	0	0	2	0	0	0	0	X	X	2
Ontario (Bice)	1	2	0	0	2	2	0	3	X	X	10

Draw 6

Sheet B	1	2	3	4	5	6	7	8	9	10	Final
British Columbia (Montgomery) 🔨	3	0	3	3	0	1	0	2	X	X	12
Newfoundland and Labrador (Blandford)	0	1	0	0	2	0	2	0	X	X	5

Sheet D	1	2	3	4	5	6	7	8	9	10	Final
New Brunswick (Sherrard) 🔨	4	1	0	5	0	0	0	1	X	X	11
Northwest Territories (Moss)	0	0	1	0	0	2	1	0	X	X	4

Sheet F	1	2	3	4	5	6	7	8	9	10	Final
Quebec (Crete) 🔨	2	0	4	1	0	1	X	X	X	X	8
Manitoba (Carruthers)	0	1	0	0	1	0	X	X	X	X	2

Sheet H	1	2	3	4	5	6	7	8	9	10	Final
Prince Edward Island (MacKenzie) 🔨	3	0	0	1	1	3	0	0	0	X	8
Yukon (Gee)	0	1	3	0	0	0	1	0	0	X	5

Sheet J	1	2	3	4	5	6	7	8	9	10	Final
Saskatchewan (Laycock) 🔨	0	3	1	0	4	0	X	X	X	X	8
Northern Ontario (Koivula)	0	0	0	1	0	1	X	X	X	X	2

Draw 7

Sheet B	1	2	3	4	5	6	7	8	9	10	Final
Ontario (Bice) 🔨	0	1	0	1	0	1	0	0	1	X	4
Nova Scotia (Saccary)	0	0	2	0	2	0	2	2	0	X	8

Sheet D	1	2	3	4	5	6	7	8	9	10	Final
Yukon (Gee) 🔨	2	0	1	0	3	1	4	X	X	X	11
Alberta (Moulding)	0	3	0	1	0	0	0	X	X	X	4

Sheet E	1	2	3	4	5	6	7	8	9	10	Final
Manitoba (Carruthers) 🔨	0	0	0	0	0	0	0	0	0	1	1
Northwest Territories (Moss)	0	0	0	0	0	0	0	0	0	0	0

Sheet G	1	2	3	4	5	6	7	8	9	10	11	Final
Northern Ontario (Koivula) 🔨	1	0	0	0	1	0	0	1	1	1	1	6
Newfoundland and Labrador (Blandford)	0	2	1	1	0	0	1	0	0	0	0	5

Draw 8

Sheet A	1	2	3	4	5	6	7	8	9	10	Final
British Columbia (Montgomery) 🔨	0	1	0	2	1	0	2	0	1	X	7
Yukon (Gee)	1	0	1	0	0	0	0	1	0	X	3

Sheet C	1	2	3	4	5	6	7	8	9	10	Final
New Brunswick (Sherrard) 🔨	1	0	1	0	0	0	0	1	0	X	3
Saskatchewan (Laycock)	0	2	0	0	1	1	1	0	1	X	6

Sheet H	1	2	3	4	5	6	7	8	9	10	Final
Nova Scotia (Saccary) 🔨	1	2	0	0	2	0	0	1	0	0	6
Prince Edward Island (MacKenzie)	0	0	0	2	0	0	3	0	1	1	7

Sheet J	1	2	3	4	5	6	7	8	9	10	Final
Newfoundland and Labrador (Blandford) 🔨	0	0	3	1	0	0	0	1	X	X	5
Quebec (Crete)	0	1	0	0	2	2	4	0	X	X	9

Draw 9

Sheet A	1	2	3	4	5	6	7	8	9	10	Final
Prince Edward Island (MacKenzie) 🔨	0	0	3	0	1	0	0	1	0	1	6
Manitoba (Carruthers)	0	0	0	0	0	2	1	0	1	0	4

Sheet C	1	2	3	4	5	6	7	8	9	10	Final
Northwest Territories (Moss) 🔨	1	0	0	0	2	2	0	1	0	1	7
Northern Ontario (Koivula)	0	0	0	2	0	0	1	0	1	0	4

Sheet F	1	2	3	4	5	6	7	8	9	10	Final
Alberta (Moulding) 🔨	0	3	0	1	2	1	0	0	0	1	8
Ontario (Bice)	0	0	3	0	0	0	2	1	0	0	6

Sheet G	1	2	3	4	5	6	7	8	9	10	Final
Quebec (Crete) 🔨	0	1	1	0	3	0	0	0	0	0	5
New Brunswick (Sherrard)	1	0	0	2	0	2	0	0	1	2	8

Sheet I	1	2	3	4	5	6	7	8	9	10	Final
Saskatchewan (Laycock) 🔨	1	0	2	0	1	0	2	2	0	1	9
British Columbia (Montgomery)	0	2	0	1	0	1	0	0	2	0	6

Draw 10

Sheet A	1	2	3	4	5	6	7	8	9	10	Final
Alberta (Moulding) 🔨	0	0	0	0	1	0	0	2	1	X	4
Saskatchewan (Laycock)	1	0	1	1	0	2	1	0	0	X	6

Sheet D	1	2	3	4	5	6	7	8	9	10	Final
Newfoundland and Labrador (Blandford) 🔨	2	0	3	1	0	0	3	1	X	X	10
Manitoba (Carruthers)	0	2	0	0	1	1	0	0	X	X	4

Sheet H	1	2	3	4	5	6	7	8	9	10	Final
British Columbia (Montgomery) 🔨	0	0	1	0	0	0	2	1	1	0	5
Quebec (Crete)	0	2	0	2	1	1	0	0	0	1	7

Draw 11

Sheet A	1	2	3	4	5	6	7	8	9	10	Final
Quebec (Crete) 🔨	1	1	0	3	0	5	2	X	X	X	12
Northwest Territories (Moss)	0	0	1	0	2	0	0	X	X	X	3

Sheet D	1	2	3	4	5	6	7	8	9	10	Final
New Brunswick (Sherrard) 🔨	0	1	0	1	0	1	0	0	0	X	3
Northern Ontario (Koivula)	0	0	1	0	2	0	0	2	0	X	5

Sheet F	1	2	3	4	5	6	7	8	9	10	Final
Nova Scotia (Saccary) 🔨	2	0	2	0	3	0	3	X	X	X	10
Yukon (Gee)	0	0	0	0	0	2	0	X	X	X	2

Sheet G	1	2	3	4	5	6	7	8	9	10	Final
Prince Edward Island (MacKenzie) 🔨	0	0	0	0	3	0	2	1	3	X	9
Alberta (Moulding)	0	0	0	1	0	1	0	0	0	X	2

Sheet J	1	2	3	4	5	6	7	8	9	10	Final
Manitoba (Carruthers) 🔨	2	0	0	0	0	2	0	0	1	X	5
Ontario (Bice)	0	1	0	1	0	0	4	3	0	X	9

Draw 12

Sheet B	1	2	3	4	5	6	7	8	9	10	Final
Northern Ontario (Koivula) 🔨	2	0	0	3	2	2	1	X	X	X	10
Prince Edward Island (MacKenzie)	0	2	0	0	0	0	0	X	X	X	2

Sheet D	1	2	3	4	5	6	7	8	9	10	Final
Northwest Territories (Moss) 🔨	0	0	1	0	0	0	0	0	0	X	1
Nova Scotia (Saccary)	0	1	0	0	2	0	0	1	1	X	5

Sheet E	1	2	3	4	5	6	7	8	9	10	11	Final
Ontario (Bice) 🔨	0	1	0	1	1	0	0	0	0	1	0	4
British Columbia (Montgomery)	0	0	1	0	0	1	1	1	0	0	1	5

Sheet H	1	2	3	4	5	6	7	8	9	10	Final
Saskatchewan (Laycock) 🔨	2	0	3	1	1	0	X	X	X	X	7
Newfoundland and Labrador (Blandford)	0	0	0	0	0	1	X	X	X	X	1

Sheet I	1	2	3	4	5	6	7	8	9	10	Final
Yukon (Gee) 🔨	0	0	2	1	0	2	0	0	1	X	6
New Brunswick (Sherrard)	2	1	0	0	2	0	2	1	0	X	8

Draw 13

Sheet B	1	2	3	4	5	6	7	8	9	10	Final
Nova Scotia (Saccary) 🔨	1	0	0	1	0	0	0	2	1	1	6
Quebec (Crete)	0	0	1	0	0	2	1	0	0	0	4

Sheet C	1	2	3	4	5	6	7	8	9	10	11	Final
British Columbia (Montgomery) 🔨	0	0	0	1	1	0	3	0	1	0	1	7
Manitoba (Carruthers)	0	1	0	0	0	2	0	1	0	2	0	6

Sheet H	1	2	3	4	5	6	7	8	9	10	Final
Prince Edward Island (MacKenzie) 🔨	2	0	0	2	0	3	0	3	0	0	10
New Brunswick (Sherrard)	0	2	2	0	1	0	1	0	2	1	9

Sheet J	1	2	3	4	5	6	7	8	9	10	Final
Northern Ontario (Koivula) 🔨	0	1	0	1	0	4	0	4	X	X	10
Yukon (Gee)	0	0	1	0	1	0	2	0	X	X	4

Draw 14

Sheet A	1	2	3	4	5	6	7	8	9	10	Final
Ontario (Bice) 🔨	2	1	1	0	0	1	0	0	2	1	8
Newfoundland and Labrador (Blandford)	0	0	0	1	1	0	3	2	0	0	7

Sheet E	1	2	3	4	5	6	7	8	9	10	Final
Alberta (Moulding) 🔨	0	2	0	1	0	1	0	4	X	X	8
Northern Ontario (Koivula)	0	0	0	0	1	0	1	0	X	X	2

Sheet G	1	2	3	4	5	6	7	8	9	10	Final
Northwest Territories (Moss) 🔨	1	0	0	0	0	0	0	2	1	X	4
British Columbia (Montgomery)	0	0	3	1	1	0	4	0	0	X	9

Sheet J	1	2	3	4	5	6	7	8	9	10	Final
Saskatchewan (Laycock) 🔨	1	0	0	3	1	2	3	X	X	X	10
Prince Edward Island (MacKenzie)	0	1	1	0	0	0	0	X	X	X	2

Draw 15

Sheet B	1	2	3	4	5	6	7	8	9	10	Final
Yukon (Gee) 🔨	0	0	0	1	0	0	0	0	2	0	3
Northwest Territories (Moss)	0	0	0	0	1	0	1	1	0	2	5

Sheet D	1	2	3	4	5	6	7	8	9	10	Final
Quebec (Crete) 🔨	0	1	1	0	1	0	3	0	1	X	7
Ontario (Bice)	0	0	0	1	0	1	0	1	0	X	3

Sheet F	1	2	3	4	5	6	7	8	9	10	Final
Manitoba (Carruthers) 🔨	1	0	0	0	0	0	2	0	X	X	3
Saskatchewan (Laycock)	0	0	1	0	2	2	0	3	X	X	8

Sheet G	1	2	3	4	5	6	7	8	9	10	Final
Newfoundland and Labrador (Blandford) 🔨	2	0	0	1	0	1	0	0	X	X	4
Alberta (Moulding)	0	2	2	0	4	0	0	0	X	X	8

Sheet J	1	2	3	4	5	6	7	8	9	10	Final
New Brunswick (Sherrard) 🔨	1	0	1	0	1	0	2	0	2	X	7
Nova Scotia (Saccary)	0	2	0	2	0	1	0	0	0	X	5

Draw 16

Sheet D	1	2	3	4	5	6	7	8	9	10	Final
Saskatchewan (Laycock) 🔨	4	3	2	0	4	0	X	X	X	X	13
Yukon (Gee)	0	0	0	3	0	1	X	X	X	X	4

Sheet F	1	2	3	4	5	6	7	8	9	10	Final
Prince Edward Island (MacKenzie) 🔨	2	0	1	0	0	2	1	0	2	X	8
Northwest Territories (Moss)	0	1	0	0	1	0	0	2	0	X	4

Sheet H	1	2	3	4	5	6	7	8	9	10	Final
Northern Ontario (Koivula) 🔨	0	2	0	0	0	2	0	1	0	0	5
Quebec (Crete)	0	0	3	0	1	0	1	0	2	2	9

Sheet J	1	2	3	4	5	6	7	8	9	10	Final
British Columbia (Montgomery) 🔨	0	1	0	2	0	2	0	0	0	1	6
Alberta (Moulding)	1	0	1	0	3	0	2	1	0	0	8

Draw 17

Sheet A	1	2	3	4	5	6	7	8	9	10	Final
Manitoba (Carruthers) 🔨	0	0	1	0	1	2	0	1	0	X	5
Northern Ontario (Koivula)	1	0	0	0	0	0	0	0	2	X	3

Sheet C	1	2	3	4	5	6	7	8	9	10	Final
Alberta (Moulding) 🔨	0	0	0	0	0	3	0	0	0	1	4
Nova Scotia (Saccary)	0	0	0	0	0	0	1	0	0	0	1

Sheet F	1	2	3	4	5	6	7	8	9	10	Final
Newfoundland and Labrador (Blandford) 🔨	0	1	0	0	1	0	0	X	X	X	2
New Brunswick (Sherrard)	1	0	3	2	0	0	4	X	X	X	10

Sheet G	1	2	3	4	5	6	7	8	9	10	Final
Yukon (Gee) 🔨	1	0	1	0	1	1	0	1	0	X	5
Ontario (Bice)	0	1	0	3	0	0	2	0	4	X	10

Draw 18

Sheet A	1	2	3	4	5	6	7	8	9	10	Final
New Brunswick (Sherrard) 🔨	1	0	0	2	0	0	0	X	X	X	3
British Columbia (Montgomery)	0	3	2	0	0	3	2	X	X	X	10

Sheet C	1	2	3	4	5	6	7	8	9	10	Final
Ontario (Bice) 🔨	1	1	0	2	2	1	0	4	X	X	11
Prince Edward Island (MacKenzie)	0	0	1	0	0	0	2	0	X	X	3

Sheet E	1	2	3	4	5	6	7	8	9	10	Final
Quebec (Crete) 🔨	0	2	0	0	1	0	0	4	0	0	7
Saskatchewan (Laycock)	0	0	1	1	0	1	1	0	1	1	6

Sheet G	1	2	3	4	5	6	7	8	9	10	Final
Nova Scotia (Saccary) 🔨	0	0	0	3	0	2	0	0	2	0	7
Manitoba (Carruthers)	2	0	1	0	3	0	0	1	0	2	9

Sheet I	1	2	3	4	5	6	7	8	9	10	Final
Northwest Territories (Moss) 🔨	0	0	1	0	2	0	0	0	X	X	3
Newfoundland and Labrador (Blandford)	3	1	0	1	0	1	1	1	X	X	8

=== Playoffs ===
Tiebreaker		Semifinal		Final
Alberta	9
British Columbia	4	Quebec	6
		Alberta	8
				Saskatchewan	9
				Alberta	5

==== Tiebreaker ====
Sheet I	1	2	3	4	5	6	7	8	9	10	Final
Alberta (Moulding) 🔨	2	0	0	0	2	0	1	0	4	X	9
British Columbia (Montgomery)	0	1	0	0	0	2	0	1	0	X	4

Player percentages
Alberta		British Columbia	
Nicolas Virtue	85%	Will Duggan	82%
Matt Taylor	92%	Miles Craig	78%
Brock Virtue	75%	Cliff Carr-Hilton	82%
Darren Moulding	84%	Jason Montgomery	61%
Total	84%	Total	76%

==== Semifinal ====
Sheet G	1	2	3	4	5	6	7	8	9	10	Final
Quebec (Crete) 🔨	0	3	0	0	0	1	0	0	2	X	6
Alberta (Moulding)	0	0	1	1	1	0	2	3	0	X	8

Player percentages
Quebec		Alberta	
Olivier Leclerc	90%	Nicolas Virtue	75%
Kevin White	83%	Matt Taylor	75%
Jonathan Tremblay	83%	Brock Virtue	75%
Martin Crete	71%	Darren Moulding	88%
Total	82%	Total	78%

==== Final ====
Sheet C	1	2	3	4	5	6	7	8	9	10	Final
Alberta (Moulding)	1	0	0	1	0	2	0	1	0	X	5
Saskatchewan (Laycock) 🔨	0	1	1	0	2	0	2	0	3	X	9

Player percentages
Alberta		Saskatchewan	
Nicolas Virtue	81%	Kyler Broad	76%
Matt Taylor	84%	Michael Jantzen	86%
Brock Virtue	50%	Christopher Haichert	80%
Darren Moulding	71%	Steve Laycock	84%
Total	71%	Total	82%

== Women's ==
=== Teams ===
Province / Territory	Skip	Third	Second	Lead	Club
Alberta	Desiree Robertson	Cary-Anne Sallows	Jennifer Perry	Stephanie Jordan	Grande Prairie Curling Club, Grande Prairie
British Columbia	Desiree Schmidt	Leanne Palmer	Carly Frew	Brittany Palmer	Trail Curling Club, Trail
Manitoba	Jackie Komyshyn	Ashley Gill	Vanessa Hogg	Amanda Tycholis	Fort Garry Curling Club, Winnipeg
New Brunswick	Becky Atkinson	Cindy Samaan	Jeanette Murphy	Laurel Green	Riverside Country Club, Saint John
Newfoundland and Labrador	Jennifer Guzzwell	Shelley Nichols	Carol Webb	Stephanie LeDrew	St. John's Curling Club, St. John's
Northern Ontario	Shana Ketonen	Liane Fossum	Larissa Stevens	Michelle Desando	Port Arthur Curling Club, Thunder Bay
Northwest Territories	Heather Walker	Kristan Thompson	Leslie Merrithew	Francesca Marrai	Yellowknife Curling Club, Yellowknife
Nova Scotia	Robyn Mattie	Paige Mattie	Blisse Comstock	Gilda Chisholm	Chedabucto Curling Club, Boylston
Ontario	Stephanie Gray	Lyndsey Wilson	Michelle Laidlaw	Amber Gebhardt	Palmerston Curling Club, Palmerston
Prince Edward Island	Meaghan Hughes	Michelle Mackie	Sinead Dolan	Michala Robinson	Charlottetown Curling Club, Charlottetown
Quebec	Kimberly Mastine	Meg Leclerc	Andrea Morin	Marie-Eve Boislard	Club de curling Windsor, Windsor
Saskatchewan	Marliese Miller	Teejay Surik	Janelle Lemon	Chelsey Bell	Nutana Curling Club, Saskatoon
Yukon	Ladene Shaw	Stacey Sellars	Jessie Leschart	Mandi Shaw	Whitehorse Curling Club, Whitehorse

=== Standings ===
Province / Territory	W	L
Nova Scotia	10	2
Saskatchewan	10	2
Newfoundland and Labrador	9	3
Alberta	9	3
Ontario	9	3
Northern Ontario	7	5
Quebec	6	6
New Brunswick	6	6
Manitoba	6	6
British Columbia	3	9
Prince Edward Island	2	10
Northwest Territories	1	11
Yukon	0	12

=== Results ===
Draw 1

Sheet B	1	2	3	4	5	6	7	8	9	10	Final
Nova Scotia (Mattie) 🔨	0	0	2	1	1	0	0	2	0	1	7
Newfoundland and Labrador (Guzzwell)	2	0	0	0	0	0	1	0	1	0	4

Sheet D	1	2	3	4	5	6	7	8	9	10	Final
Prince Edward Island (Hughes) 🔨	0	1	0	0	0	1	0	2	0	X	4
Quebec (Mastine)	1	0	2	1	3	0	1	0	2	X	10

Sheet F	1	2	3	4	5	6	7	8	9	10	11	Final
New Brunswick (Atkinson) 🔨	1	0	2	0	1	0	2	0	0	1	0	7
Ontario (Gray)	0	1	0	1	0	1	0	3	1	0	1	8

Sheet G	1	2	3	4	5	6	7	8	9	10	Final
Northwest Territories (Walker) 🔨	0	1	1	0	1	0	0	0	0	X	3
Saskatchewan (Miller)	1	0	0	1	0	2	1	1	5	X	11

Sheet I	1	2	3	4	5	6	7	8	9	10	Final
Yukon (Shaw) 🔨	0	1	0	0	0	2	0	0	0	X	3
Manitoba (Komyshyn)	1	0	1	1	1	0	2	2	3	X	11

Draw 2

Sheet C	1	2	3	4	5	6	7	8	9	10	Final
Northern Ontario (Ketonen) 🔨	1	0	2	0	2	0	1	0	4	X	10
British Columbia (Schmidt)	0	0	0	1	0	1	0	1	0	X	3

Sheet H	1	2	3	4	5	6	7	8	9	10	11	Final
Saskatchewan (Miller) 🔨	0	0	0	1	0	1	0	2	1	1	0	6
Nova Scotia (Mattie)	1	1	0	0	2	0	2	0	0	0	1	7

Sheet J	1	2	3	4	5	6	7	8	9	10	Final
Quebec (Mastine) 🔨	0	1	0	2	2	0	0	0	0	X	5
Alberta (Robertson)	0	0	2	0	0	2	1	1	2	X	8

Draw 3

Sheet A	1	2	3	4	5	6	7	8	9	10	Final
Alberta (Robertson) 🔨	2	3	0	4	0	3	X	X	X	X	12
Northwest Territories (Walker)	0	0	1	0	1	0	X	X	X	X	2

Sheet D	1	2	3	4	5	6	7	8	9	10	Final
Newfoundland and Labrador (Guzzwell) 🔨	1	0	3	1	4	0	7	X	X	X	16
Yukon (Shaw)	0	2	0	0	0	1	0	X	X	X	3

Sheet E	1	2	3	4	5	6	7	8	9	10	Final
British Columbia (Schmidt) 🔨	0	0	1	1	2	0	1	2	1	X	8
Prince Edward Island (Hughes)	1	3	0	0	0	1	0	0	0	X	5

Sheet G	1	2	3	4	5	6	7	8	9	10	Final
Manitoba (Komyshyn) 🔨	1	0	2	3	1	0	0	2	1	X	10
New Brunswick (Atkinson)	0	2	0	0	0	2	2	0	0	X	6

Sheet J	1	2	3	4	5	6	7	8	9	10	Final
Ontario (Gray) 🔨	2	0	3	0	1	0	0	3	1	X	10
Northern Ontario (Ketonen)	0	1	0	1	0	1	2	0	0	X	5

Draw 4

Sheet B	1	2	3	4	5	6	7	8	9	10	Final
Alberta (Robertson) 🔨	2	3	0	2	2	0	1	X	X	X	10
New Brunswick (Atkinson)	0	0	3	0	0	1	0	X	X	X	4

Sheet C	1	2	3	4	5	6	7	8	9	10	Final
Newfoundland and Labrador (Guzzwell) 🔨	1	0	1	0	1	3	0	2	0	X	8
Prince Edward Island (Hughes)	0	1	0	1	0	0	1	0	3	X	6

Sheet H	1	2	3	4	5	6	7	8	9	10	Final
Ontario (Gray) 🔨	1	0	2	3	0	1	0	4	X	X	11
Saskatchewan (Miller)	0	1	0	0	2	0	2	0	X	X	5

Sheet J	1	2	3	4	5	6	7	8	9	10	Final
Nova Scotia (Mattie) 🔨	3	2	2	2	0	0	2	X	X	X	11
British Columbia (Schmidt)	0	0	0	0	1	1	0	X	X	X	2

Draw 5

Sheet B	1	2	3	4	5	6	7	8	9	10	Final
Yukon (Shaw) 🔨	0	0	1	0	0	1	0	1	X	X	3
Quebec (Mastine)	0	2	0	3	1	0	2	0	X	X	8

Sheet D	1	2	3	4	5	6	7	8	9	10	Final
Manitoba (Komyshyn) 🔨	1	0	0	1	0	0	1	0	0	X	3
Alberta (Robertson)	0	0	5	0	1	0	0	1	1	X	8

Sheet G	1	2	3	4	5	6	7	8	9	10	Final
Northern Ontario (Ketonen) 🔨	1	0	0	0	4	0	1	0	X	X	6
Nova Scotia (Mattie)	0	1	3	2	0	3	0	2	X	X	11

Sheet J	1	2	3	4	5	6	7	8	9	10	Final
Northwest Territories (Walker) 🔨	0	1	0	1	1	0	0	3	0	X	6
Ontario (Gray)	1	0	3	0	0	2	1	0	3	X	10

Draw 6

Sheet A	1	2	3	4	5	6	7	8	9	10	Final
British Columbia (Schmidt) 🔨	0	0	0	0	0	1	0	X	X	X	1
Newfoundland and Labrador (Guzzwell)	1	2	2	1	1	0	1	X	X	X	8

Sheet C	1	2	3	4	5	6	7	8	9	10	Final
New Brunswick (Atkinson) 🔨	0	1	0	3	0	1	0	4	1	X	10
Northwest Territories (Walker)	0	0	1	0	1	0	2	0	0	X	4

Sheet E	1	2	3	4	5	6	7	8	9	10	Final
Quebec (Mastine) 🔨	0	2	0	3	0	0	1	1	0	X	7
Manitoba (Komyshyn)	0	0	1	0	2	1	0	0	1	X	5

Sheet G	1	2	3	4	5	6	7	8	9	10	Final
Prince Edward Island (Hughes) 🔨	4	0	4	0	2	1	0	X	X	X	11
Yukon (Shaw)	0	2	0	1	0	0	1	X	X	X	4

Sheet I	1	2	3	4	5	6	7	8	9	10	Final
Saskatchewan (Miller) 🔨	0	3	1	0	1	1	1	X	X	X	7
Northern Ontario (Ketonen)	0	0	0	1	0	0	0	X	X	X	1

Draw 7

Sheet A	1	2	3	4	5	6	7	8	9	10	Final
Ontario (Gray) 🔨	3	0	0	0	0	1	0	1	1	0	6
Nova Scotia (Mattie)	0	1	3	1	1	0	1	0	0	1	8

Sheet C	1	2	3	4	5	6	7	8	9	10	Final
Yukon (Shaw) 🔨	0	1	0	2	0	1	0	1	0	X	5
Alberta (Robertson)	1	0	3	0	2	0	2	0	2	X	10

Sheet F	1	2	3	4	5	6	7	8	9	10	Final
Manitoba (Komyshyn) 🔨	0	0	1	0	1	2	1	1	1	X	7
Northwest Territories (Walker)	1	0	0	1	0	0	0	0	0	X	2

Sheet H	1	2	3	4	5	6	7	8	9	10	Final
Northern Ontario (Ketonen) 🔨	0	0	1	1	1	0	4	1	X	X	8
Newfoundland and Labrador (Guzzwell)	0	0	0	0	0	1	0	0	X	X	1

Draw 8

Sheet B	1	2	3	4	5	6	7	8	9	10	Final
British Columbia (Schmidt) 🔨	4	0	1	4	0	0	2	X	X	X	11
Yukon (Shaw)	0	1	0	0	0	2	0	X	X	X	3

Sheet D	1	2	3	4	5	6	7	8	9	10	Final
New Brunswick (Atkinson) 🔨	0	1	0	0	3	0	0	0	1	0	5
Saskatchewan (Miller)	1	0	0	3	0	0	2	0	0	3	9

Sheet G	1	2	3	4	5	6	7	8	9	10	Final
Nova Scotia (Mattie) 🔨	0	1	0	3	0	0	0	2	2	X	8
Prince Edward Island (Hughes)	0	0	1	0	2	1	2	0	0	X	6

Sheet I	1	2	3	4	5	6	7	8	9	10	Final
Newfoundland and Labrador (Guzzwell) 🔨	1	2	1	0	2	0	1	0	1	X	8
Quebec (Mastine)	0	0	0	2	0	2	0	1	0	X	5

Draw 9

Sheet B	1	2	3	4	5	6	7	8	9	10	Final
Prince Edward Island (Hughes) 🔨	2	0	0	1	0	0	2	0	1	1	7
Manitoba (Komyshyn)	0	2	1	0	0	3	0	2	0	0	8

Sheet D	1	2	3	4	5	6	7	8	9	10	Final
Northwest Territories (Walker) 🔨	0	0	1	0	0	2	2	0	1	0	6
Northern Ontario (Ketonen)	0	2	0	3	1	0	0	1	0	1	8

Sheet E	1	2	3	4	5	6	7	8	9	10	Final
Alberta (Robertson) 🔨	0	1	0	1	2	0	0	1	0	1	6
Ontario (Gray)	2	0	1	0	0	0	1	0	1	0	5

Sheet H	1	2	3	4	5	6	7	8	9	10	Final
Quebec (Mastine) 🔨	0	1	0	0	1	0	1	0	2	X	5
New Brunswick (Atkinson)	0	0	3	1	0	1	0	1	0	X	6

Sheet J	1	2	3	4	5	6	7	8	9	10	Final
Saskatchewan (Miller) 🔨	1	0	0	0	0	0	2	0	2	X	5
British Columbia (Schmidt)	0	0	0	1	0	0	0	1	0	X	2

Draw 10

Sheet B	1	2	3	4	5	6	7	8	9	10	Final
Alberta (Robertson) 🔨	1	0	2	0	0	0	0	0	2	0	5
Saskatchewan (Miller)	0	1	0	2	0	1	1	1	0	1	7

Sheet C	1	2	3	4	5	6	7	8	9	10	Final
Newfoundland and Labrador (Guzzwell) 🔨	1	0	2	1	1	0	5	X	X	X	10
Manitoba (Komyshyn)	0	1	0	0	0	2	0	X	X	X	3

Sheet G	1	2	3	4	5	6	7	8	9	10	Final
British Columbia (Schmidt) 🔨	1	0	0	2	0	0	0	0	X	X	3
Quebec (Mastine)	0	0	3	0	1	2	1	2	X	X	9

Draw 11

Sheet B	1	2	3	4	5	6	7	8	9	10	Final
Quebec (Mastine) 🔨	2	1	1	3	0	1	0	3	X	X	11
Northwest Territories (Walker)	0	0	0	0	1	0	1	0	X	X	2

Sheet C	1	2	3	4	5	6	7	8	9	10	Final
New Brunswick (Atkinson) 🔨	0	1	1	0	2	0	1	0	1	X	6
Northern Ontario (Ketonen)	0	0	0	1	0	0	0	1	0	X	2

Sheet E	1	2	3	4	5	6	7	8	9	10	Final
Nova Scotia (Mattie) 🔨	2	2	0	3	0	7	X	X	X	X	14
Yukon (Shaw)	0	0	1	0	1	0	X	X	X	X	2

Sheet H	1	2	3	4	5	6	7	8	9	10	Final
Prince Edward Island (Hughes) 🔨	0	0	1	1	0	2	0	0	1	X	5
Alberta (Robertson)	1	1	0	0	4	0	1	1	0	X	8

Sheet I	1	2	3	4	5	6	7	8	9	10	Final
Manitoba (Komyshyn) 🔨	0	0	0	1	0	2	1	0	X	X	4
Ontario (Gray)	1	2	2	0	3	0	0	5	X	X	13

Draw 12

Sheet A	1	2	3	4	5	6	7	8	9	10	Final
Northern Ontario (Ketonen) 🔨	0	5	0	0	4	0	4	X	X	X	13
Prince Edward Island (Hughes)	1	0	4	0	0	1	0	X	X	X	6

Sheet C	1	2	3	4	5	6	7	8	9	10	11	Final
Northwest Territories (Walker) 🔨	1	0	2	0	0	1	1	1	0	2	0	8
Nova Scotia (Mattie)	0	1	0	4	2	0	0	0	1	0	1	9

Sheet F	1	2	3	4	5	6	7	8	9	10	Final
Ontario (Gray) 🔨	0	1	1	3	0	2	0	2	0	X	9
British Columbia (Schmidt)	2	0	0	0	2	0	1	0	2	X	7

Sheet G	1	2	3	4	5	6	7	8	9	10	Final
Saskatchewan (Miller) 🔨	1	0	2	0	0	3	0	2	0	1	9
Newfoundland and Labrador (Guzzwell)	0	1	0	1	2	0	2	0	1	0	7

Sheet J	1	2	3	4	5	6	7	8	9	10	Final
Yukon (Shaw) 🔨	0	1	0	0	2	0	1	0	1	X	5
New Brunswick (Atkinson)	2	0	1	1	0	3	0	3	0	X	10

Draw 13

Sheet A	1	2	3	4	5	6	7	8	9	10	Final
Nova Scotia (Mattie) 🔨	1	2	2	0	3	1	1	1	X	X	11
Quebec (Mastine)	0	0	0	3	0	0	0	0	X	X	3

Sheet D	1	2	3	4	5	6	7	8	9	10	11	Final
British Columbia (Schmidt) 🔨	0	0	1	0	0	2	0	0	1	0	0	4
Manitoba (Komyshyn)	0	0	0	2	0	0	0	1	0	1	1	5

Sheet G	1	2	3	4	5	6	7	8	9	10	Final
Prince Edward Island (Hughes) 🔨	1	0	0	1	0	0	0	X	X	X	2
New Brunswick (Atkinson)	0	0	2	0	3	1	3	X	X	X	9

Sheet I	1	2	3	4	5	6	7	8	9	10	Final
Northern Ontario (Ketonen) 🔨	3	3	1	1	1	0	X	X	X	X	9
Yukon (Shaw)	0	0	0	0	0	1	X	X	X	X	1

Draw 14

Sheet B	1	2	3	4	5	6	7	8	9	10	Final
Ontario (Gray) 🔨	2	0	0	2	0	0	1	0	X	X	5
Newfoundland and Labrador (Guzzwell)	0	2	1	0	3	3	0	0	X	X	9

Sheet F	1	2	3	4	5	6	7	8	9	10	Final
Alberta (Robertson) 🔨	2	0	1	1	0	0	0	0	0	X	4
Northern Ontario (Ketonen)	0	1	0	0	2	0	1	2	1	X	7

Sheet H	1	2	3	4	5	6	7	8	9	10	Final
Northwest Territories (Walker) 🔨	0	2	0	3	0	1	0	3	1	X	10
British Columbia (Schmidt)	2	0	2	0	3	0	5	0	0	X	12

Sheet I	1	2	3	4	5	6	7	8	9	10	Final
Saskatchewan (Miller) 🔨	1	0	3	0	0	0	1	1	0	0	6
Prince Edward Island (Hughes)	0	1	0	1	0	1	0	0	1	1	5

Draw 15

Sheet A	1	2	3	4	5	6	7	8	9	10	Final
Yukon (Shaw) 🔨	0	1	0	0	0	2	0	2	0	X	5
Northwest Territories (Walker)	3	0	2	1	1	0	3	0	2	X	12

Sheet C	1	2	3	4	5	6	7	8	9	10	Final
Quebec (Mastine) 🔨	0	1	0	0	2	0	0	1	0	X	4
Ontario (Gray)	1	0	1	1	0	2	0	0	4	X	9

Sheet E	1	2	3	4	5	6	7	8	9	10	Final
Manitoba (Komyshyn) 🔨	0	0	2	0	1	0	2	0	1	X	6
Saskatchewan (Miller)	0	1	0	2	0	3	0	3	0	X	9

Sheet H	1	2	3	4	5	6	7	8	9	10	Final
Newfoundland and Labrador (Guzzwell) 🔨	3	0	3	0	1	1	0	2	X	X	10
Alberta (Robertson)	0	2	0	1	0	0	1	0	X	X	4

Sheet I	1	2	3	4	5	6	7	8	9	10	Final
New Brunswick (Atkinson) 🔨	0	1	0	0	0	1	0	2	1	0	5
Nova Scotia (Mattie)	1	0	0	1	1	0	1	0	0	2	6

Draw 16

Sheet C	1	2	3	4	5	6	7	8	9	10	Final
Saskatchewan (Miller) 🔨	1	0	3	2	0	5	X	X	X	X	11
Yukon (Shaw)	0	1	0	0	1	0	X	X	X	X	2

Sheet E	1	2	3	4	5	6	7	8	9	10	Final
Prince Edward Island (Hughes) 🔨	1	0	0	0	1	1	0	4	1	X	8
Northwest Territories (Walker)	0	3	0	2	0	0	1	0	0	X	6

Sheet G	1	2	3	4	5	6	7	8	9	10	Final
Northern Ontario (Ketonen) 🔨	1	0	0	2	0	0	2	0	1	0	6
Quebec (Mastine)	0	1	1	0	2	1	0	1	0	1	7

Sheet I	1	2	3	4	5	6	7	8	9	10	Final
British Columbia (Schmidt) 🔨	0	0	0	1	1	1	0	0	1	0	4
Alberta (Robertson)	0	1	2	0	0	0	1	1	0	3	8

Draw 17

Sheet B	1	2	3	4	5	6	7	8	9	10	Final
Manitoba (Komyshyn) 🔨	2	0	0	4	0	0	1	1	0	0	8
Northern Ontario (Ketonen)	0	1	2	0	1	2	0	0	2	1	9

Sheet D	1	2	3	4	5	6	7	8	9	10	Final
Alberta (Robertson) 🔨	1	0	0	0	0	1	2	1	0	X	5
Nova Scotia (Mattie)	0	0	0	1	0	0	0	0	1	X	2

Sheet E	1	2	3	4	5	6	7	8	9	10	Final
Newfoundland and Labrador (Guzzwell) 🔨	1	0	0	2	0	2	0	0	1	2	8
New Brunswick (Atkinson)	0	1	1	0	1	0	1	0	0	0	4

Sheet H	1	2	3	4	5	6	7	8	9	10	Final
Yukon (Shaw) 🔨	0	1	0	0	1	0	X	X	X	X	2
Ontario (Gray)	3	0	4	3	0	1	X	X	X	X	11

Draw 18

Sheet B	1	2	3	4	5	6	7	8	9	10	Final
New Brunswick (Atkinson) 🔨	0	0	2	0	0	0	1	1	1	X	5
British Columbia (Schmidt)	1	0	0	1	1	0	0	0	0	X	3

Sheet D	1	2	3	4	5	6	7	8	9	10	Final
Ontario (Gray) 🔨	1	0	2	0	1	0	2	2	0	X	8
Prince Edward Island (Hughes)	0	1	0	1	0	1	0	0	2	X	5

Sheet F	1	2	3	4	5	6	7	8	9	10	Final
Quebec (Mastine) 🔨	0	0	0	2	0	2	0	0	1	X	5
Saskatchewan (Miller)	0	1	0	0	2	0	2	1	0	X	6

Sheet H	1	2	3	4	5	6	7	8	9	10	Final
Nova Scotia (Mattie) 🔨	1	0	0	1	0	0	0	X	X	X	2
Manitoba (Komyshyn)	0	2	3	0	1	0	3	X	X	X	9

Sheet J	1	2	3	4	5	6	7	8	9	10	Final
Northwest Territories (Walker) 🔨	0	3	0	0	0	1	0	X	X	X	4
Newfoundland and Labrador (Guzzwell)	1	0	3	3	2	0	1	X	X	X	10

=== Playoffs ===
Tiebreaker #1
Alberta	11
Ontario	6

Tiebreaker #2
Newfoundland and Labrador	5
Alberta	9

Semifinal
Saskatchewan	7
Alberta	5

Final
Nova Scotia	4
Saskatchewan	6

==== Tiebreaker #1 ====
Sheet I	1	2	3	4	5	6	7	8	9	10	Final
Ontario (Gray)	0	2	1	0	1	0	2	0	0	X	6
Alberta (Robertson) 🔨	3	0	0	2	0	2	0	1	3	X	11

Player percentages
Ontario		Alberta	
Amber Gebhardt	93%	Stephanie Jordan	85%
Michelle Laidlaw	89%	Jennifer Perry	81%
Lyndsey Wilson	78%	Cary-Anne Sallows	86%
Stephanie Gray	67%	Desiree Robertson	69%
Total	82%	Total	80%

==== Tiebreaker #2 ====
Sheet G	1	2	3	4	5	6	7	8	9	10	Final
Newfoundland and Labrador (Guzzwell) 🔨	1	1	0	2	0	0	1	0	0	0	5
Alberta (Robertson)	0	0	2	0	1	1	0	1	1	3	9

Player percentages
Newfoundland and Labrador		Alberta	
Stephanie LeDrew	78%	Stephanie Jordan	78%
Carol Webb	75%	Jennifer Perry	75%
Shelley Nichols	59%	Cary-Anne Sallows	63%
Jennifer Cuzzwell	61%	Desiree Robertson	61%
Total	68%	Total	69%

==== Semifinal ====
Sheet I	1	2	3	4	5	6	7	8	9	10	Final
Saskatchewan (Miller) 🔨	1	0	0	1	0	1	0	0	2	2	7
Alberta (Robertson)	0	1	0	0	2	0	0	2	0	0	5

Player percentages
Saskatchewan		Alberta	
Chelsey Bell	81%	Stephanie Jordan	83%
Janelle Lemon	78%	Jennifer Perry	89%
Teejay Surik	84%	Cary-Anne Sallows	89%
Marliese Miller	81%	Desiree Robertson	86%
Total	81%	Total	87%

==== Final ====
Sheet C	1	2	3	4	5	6	7	8	9	10	Final
Nova Scotia (Mattie) 🔨	1	0	0	1	0	0	2	0	0	0	4
Saskatchewan (Miller)	0	2	0	0	2	1	0	0	0	1	6

Player percentages
Nova Scotia		Saskatchewan	
Gilda Chisholm	73%	Chelsey Bell	78%
Blisse Comstock	63%	Janelle Lemon	89%
Paige Mattie	81%	Teejay Surik	85%
Robyn Mattie	70%	Marliese Miller	92%
Total	72%	Total	86%

== Qualification ==
=== Ontario ===
The Teranet Ontario Junior Curling Championships were held January 7-12 at the Brant Curling Club in Brantford.

Stephanie Gray defeated Lee Merklinger from the Granite Curling Club of West Ottawa in the women's final.

In the men's final, Mark Bice of the Sarnia Curling Club defeated Chris Ciasnocha of the Rideau Curling Club 7-5.
