= 2004 Canadian Junior Curling Championships =

The 2004 Kärcher Canadian Junior Curling Championships were held February 7–15 at the Juan de Fuca Recreation Centre in Victoria, British Columbia. The winning teams represented Canada at the 2004 World Junior Curling Championships.

== Men's ==
=== Teams ===
| Province / Territory | Skip | Third | Second | Lead |
|---|---|---|---|---|
| Alberta | Chris Schille | Chad Watt | Thomas Usselman | Cory Bachmeier |
| British Columbia | Chris Baier | William Sutton | Ryan Campbell | Andrew McMullen |
| Manitoba | Daley Peters | Matthew Lacroix | Brendan Neufeld | Marc Lacroix |
| New Brunswick | Ryan Sherrard | Jason Roach | Darren Roach | Jared Bezanson |
| Newfoundland and Labrador | Matthew Blandford | Trent Skanes | Paul Steeves | Andrew Mercer |
| Northern Ontario | Jamie Morphet | Matt Dumontelle | Paul Arkilander | Ryan Lafraniere |
| Northwest Territories | Allan Borden | Drew Burgess | Thomas Borschneck | Robert Borden |
| Nova Scotia | James Christianson | Brad MacInnis | Todd Moors | Joshua MacInnis |
| Ontario | John Epping | Wes Johnson | John Grant | Bill Francis |
| Prince Edward Island | Brett Gallant | Mitch O'Shea | Matt Smith | Pat Callbeck |
| Quebec | Martin Crete | Jonathan Tremblay | Kevin White | Olivier Leclerc |
| Saskatchewan | Ben Wilson | Stephen Perras | Jason Barnhart | Peter Wilson |
| Yukon | Trevor Prosko | Alexx Peech | Steven Boyd | Cole Hume |

=== Standings ===
| Locale | Skip | W | L |
|---|---|---|---|
| Newfoundland and Labrador | Matthew Blandford | 9 | 3 |
| Manitoba | Daley Peters | 9 | 3 |
| New Brunswick | Ryan Sherrard | 9 | 3 |
| Ontario | John Epping | 8 | 4 |
| Northern Ontario | Jamie Morphet | 8 | 4 |
| Alberta | Chris Schille | 7 | 5 |
| Quebec | Martin Crete | 7 | 5 |
| British Columbia | Chris Baier | 6 | 6 |
| Saskatchewan | Ben Wilson | 5 | 7 |
| Yukon | Trevor Prosko | 4 | 8 |
| Prince Edward Island | Brett Gallant | 3 | 9 |
| Nova Scotia | James Christianson | 2 | 10 |
| Northwest Territories | Allan Borden | 1 | 11 |

=== Results ===
==== Draw 1 ====
| Sheet B | 1 | 2 | 3 | 4 | 5 | 6 | 7 | 8 | 9 | 10 | Final |
|---|---|---|---|---|---|---|---|---|---|---|---|
| Nova Scotia (Christianson) | 1 | 0 | 0 | 0 | 2 | 0 | 0 | 0 | 2 | X | 5 |
| Manitoba (Peters) | 0 | 2 | 2 | 3 | 0 | 0 | 1 | 0 | 0 | X | 8 |

| Sheet D | 1 | 2 | 3 | 4 | 5 | 6 | 7 | 8 | 9 | 10 | Final |
|---|---|---|---|---|---|---|---|---|---|---|---|
| Northern Ontario (Morphet) | 0 | 0 | 0 | 2 | 0 | 0 | 1 | 0 | 1 | 0 | 4 |
| British Columbia (Baier) | 1 | 0 | 0 | 0 | 1 | 1 | 0 | 0 | 0 | 4 | 7 |

| Sheet F | 1 | 2 | 3 | 4 | 5 | 6 | 7 | 8 | 9 | 10 | 11 | Final |
|---|---|---|---|---|---|---|---|---|---|---|---|---|
| Quebec (Crete) | 0 | 2 | 0 | 1 | 0 | 2 | 0 | 0 | 1 | 0 | 1 | 7 |
| New Brunswick (Sherrard) | 1 | 0 | 1 | 0 | 2 | 0 | 0 | 1 | 0 | 1 | 0 | 6 |

| Sheet H | 1 | 2 | 3 | 4 | 5 | 6 | 7 | 8 | 9 | 10 | Final |
|---|---|---|---|---|---|---|---|---|---|---|---|
| Northwest Territories (Borden) | 1 | 0 | 1 | 0 | 1 | 0 | 0 | 1 | 0 | X | 4 |
| Prince Edward Island (Gallant) | 0 | 2 | 0 | 2 | 0 | 2 | 2 | 0 | 2 | X | 10 |

| Sheet J | 1 | 2 | 3 | 4 | 5 | 6 | 7 | 8 | 9 | 10 | Final |
|---|---|---|---|---|---|---|---|---|---|---|---|
| Newfoundland and Labrador (Blandford) | 3 | 0 | 0 | 3 | 0 | 1 | 0 | 1 | 1 | X | 9 |
| Saskatchewan (Wilson) | 0 | 2 | 0 | 0 | 1 | 0 | 3 | 0 | 0 | X | 6 |

| Sheet L | 1 | 2 | 3 | 4 | 5 | 6 | 7 | 8 | 9 | 10 | Final |
|---|---|---|---|---|---|---|---|---|---|---|---|
| Ontario (Epping) | 0 | 1 | 0 | 3 | 0 | 2 | 0 | 2 | 1 | 0 | 9 |
| Yukon (Prosko) | 1 | 0 | 2 | 0 | 3 | 0 | 1 | 0 | 0 | 1 | 8 |

==== Draw 2 ====
| Sheet A | 1 | 2 | 3 | 4 | 5 | 6 | 7 | 8 | 9 | 10 | Final |
|---|---|---|---|---|---|---|---|---|---|---|---|
| Yukon (Prosko) | 1 | 0 | 1 | 0 | 3 | 0 | 0 | 3 | 0 | 0 | 8 |
| Saskatchewan (Wilson) | 0 | 2 | 0 | 1 | 0 | 2 | 0 | 0 | 1 | 1 | 7 |

| Sheet C | 1 | 2 | 3 | 4 | 5 | 6 | 7 | 8 | 9 | 10 | Final |
|---|---|---|---|---|---|---|---|---|---|---|---|
| Nova Scotia (Christianson) | 1 | 0 | 0 | 0 | 0 | 0 | X | X | X | X | 1 |
| Newfoundland and Labrador (Blandford) | 0 | 0 | 4 | 2 | 3 | 1 | X | X | X | X | 10 |

| Sheet E | 1 | 2 | 3 | 4 | 5 | 6 | 7 | 8 | 9 | 10 | Final |
|---|---|---|---|---|---|---|---|---|---|---|---|
| Alberta (Schille) | 0 | 2 | 0 | 0 | 2 | 0 | 0 | 0 | 2 | X | 6 |
| Northwest Territories (Borden) | 0 | 0 | 0 | 0 | 0 | 0 | 1 | 0 | 0 | X | 1 |

| Sheet G | 1 | 2 | 3 | 4 | 5 | 6 | 7 | 8 | 9 | 10 | Final |
|---|---|---|---|---|---|---|---|---|---|---|---|
| Northern Ontario (Morphet) | 2 | 2 | 0 | 4 | 1 | 0 | X | X | X | X | 9 |
| Manitoba (Peters) | 0 | 0 | 1 | 0 | 0 | 1 | X | X | X | X | 2 |

| Sheet I | 1 | 2 | 3 | 4 | 5 | 6 | 7 | 8 | 9 | 10 | Final |
|---|---|---|---|---|---|---|---|---|---|---|---|
| Ontario (Epping) | 1 | 0 | 0 | 0 | 2 | 0 | 3 | 0 | 0 | 0 | 6 |
| Quebec (Crete) | 0 | 0 | 0 | 2 | 0 | 1 | 0 | 2 | 1 | 1 | 7 |

| Sheet K | 1 | 2 | 3 | 4 | 5 | 6 | 7 | 8 | 9 | 10 | Final |
|---|---|---|---|---|---|---|---|---|---|---|---|
| New Brunswick (Sherrard) | 1 | 1 | 0 | 0 | 2 | 0 | 0 | 1 | 0 | 1 | 6 |
| Prince Edward Island (Gallant) | 0 | 0 | 0 | 2 | 0 | 1 | 1 | 0 | 1 | 0 | 5 |

==== Draw 3 ====
| Sheet A | 1 | 2 | 3 | 4 | 5 | 6 | 7 | 8 | 9 | 10 | Final |
|---|---|---|---|---|---|---|---|---|---|---|---|
| Prince Edward Island (Gallant) | 0 | 0 | 1 | 0 | 0 | 0 | 1 | 1 | 0 | X | 3 |
| British Columbia (Baier) | 0 | 3 | 0 | 1 | 0 | 1 | 0 | 0 | 3 | X | 8 |

| Sheet C | 1 | 2 | 3 | 4 | 5 | 6 | 7 | 8 | 9 | 10 | Final |
|---|---|---|---|---|---|---|---|---|---|---|---|
| Manitoba (Peters) | 2 | 0 | 1 | 0 | 0 | 0 | 0 | 1 | 0 | 1 | 5 |
| Alberta (Schille) | 0 | 0 | 0 | 0 | 0 | 0 | 1 | 0 | 3 | 0 | 4 |

| Sheet E | 1 | 2 | 3 | 4 | 5 | 6 | 7 | 8 | 9 | 10 | Final |
|---|---|---|---|---|---|---|---|---|---|---|---|
| Nova Scotia (Christianson) | 0 | 3 | 0 | 1 | 0 | 1 | 0 | 0 | 0 | X | 5 |
| Ontario (Epping) | 1 | 0 | 1 | 0 | 2 | 0 | 2 | 3 | 2 | X | 11 |

| Sheet G | 1 | 2 | 3 | 4 | 5 | 6 | 7 | 8 | 9 | 10 | Final |
|---|---|---|---|---|---|---|---|---|---|---|---|
| Saskatchewan (Wilson) | 0 | 2 | 0 | 1 | 0 | 1 | 0 | 1 | 0 | X | 5 |
| Quebec (Crete) | 1 | 0 | 4 | 0 | 0 | 0 | 0 | 0 | 3 | X | 8 |

| Sheet I | 1 | 2 | 3 | 4 | 5 | 6 | 7 | 8 | 9 | 10 | Final |
|---|---|---|---|---|---|---|---|---|---|---|---|
| Yukon (Prosko) | 1 | 0 | 2 | 0 | 0 | 1 | 1 | 0 | 0 | 2 | 7 |
| Northwest Territories (Borden) | 0 | 1 | 0 | 1 | 0 | 0 | 0 | 2 | 0 | 0 | 4 |

| Sheet K | 1 | 2 | 3 | 4 | 5 | 6 | 7 | 8 | 9 | 10 | Final |
|---|---|---|---|---|---|---|---|---|---|---|---|
| Newfoundland and Labrador (Blandford) | 2 | 0 | 2 | 0 | 0 | 0 | 1 | 0 | 0 | 0 | 5 |
| Northern Ontario (Morphet) | 0 | 2 | 0 | 0 | 0 | 1 | 0 | 1 | 0 | 2 | 6 |

==== Draw 4 ====
| Sheet B | 1 | 2 | 3 | 4 | 5 | 6 | 7 | 8 | 9 | 10 | Final |
|---|---|---|---|---|---|---|---|---|---|---|---|
| Quebec (Crete) | 0 | 0 | 3 | 0 | 1 | 1 | 0 | 1 | 3 | X | 9 |
| Northwest Territories (Borden) | 0 | 0 | 0 | 1 | 0 | 0 | 1 | 0 | 0 | X | 2 |

| Sheet C | 1 | 2 | 3 | 4 | 5 | 6 | 7 | 8 | 9 | 10 | Final |
|---|---|---|---|---|---|---|---|---|---|---|---|
| New Brunswick (Sherrard) | 0 | 1 | 0 | 1 | 0 | 1 | 0 | 1 | 0 | 1 | 5 |
| Saskatchewan (Wilson) | 0 | 0 | 1 | 0 | 0 | 0 | 2 | 0 | 1 | 0 | 4 |

| Sheet E | 1 | 2 | 3 | 4 | 5 | 6 | 7 | 8 | 9 | 10 | Final |
|---|---|---|---|---|---|---|---|---|---|---|---|
| Manitoba (Peters) | 4 | 0 | 2 | 0 | 2 | 0 | X | X | X | X | 8 |
| Yukon (Prosko) | 0 | 0 | 0 | 1 | 0 | 1 | X | X | X | X | 2 |

| Sheet H | 1 | 2 | 3 | 4 | 5 | 6 | 7 | 8 | 9 | 10 | Final |
|---|---|---|---|---|---|---|---|---|---|---|---|
| Northern Ontario (Morphet) | 2 | 0 | 0 | 1 | 2 | 1 | 1 | 1 | X | X | 8 |
| Nova Scotia (Christianson) | 0 | 0 | 1 | 0 | 0 | 0 | 0 | 0 | X | X | 1 |

| Sheet J | 1 | 2 | 3 | 4 | 5 | 6 | 7 | 8 | 9 | 10 | Final |
|---|---|---|---|---|---|---|---|---|---|---|---|
| Alberta (Schille) | 0 | 0 | 3 | 0 | 0 | 1 | 0 | 3 | 0 | X | 7 |
| Prince Edward Island (Gallant) | 0 | 0 | 0 | 0 | 1 | 0 | 1 | 0 | 1 | X | 3 |

| Sheet K | 1 | 2 | 3 | 4 | 5 | 6 | 7 | 8 | 9 | 10 | Final |
|---|---|---|---|---|---|---|---|---|---|---|---|
| British Columbia (Baier) | 0 | 0 | 1 | 0 | 0 | 1 | 0 | X | X | X | 2 |
| Ontario (Epping) | 1 | 1 | 0 | 2 | 1 | 0 | 3 | X | X | X | 8 |

==== Draw 5 ====
| Sheet A | 1 | 2 | 3 | 4 | 5 | 6 | 7 | 8 | 9 | 10 | Final |
|---|---|---|---|---|---|---|---|---|---|---|---|
| Alberta (Schille) | 2 | 0 | 1 | 0 | 0 | 0 | 0 | 3 | 0 | X | 6 |
| Northern Ontario (Morphet) | 0 | 1 | 0 | 0 | 1 | 0 | 0 | 0 | 1 | X | 3 |

| Sheet C | 1 | 2 | 3 | 4 | 5 | 6 | 7 | 8 | 9 | 10 | Final |
|---|---|---|---|---|---|---|---|---|---|---|---|
| Ontario (Epping) | 0 | 3 | 0 | 3 | 0 | 0 | 2 | 0 | 3 | X | 11 |
| Northwest Territories (Borden) | 0 | 0 | 1 | 0 | 0 | 3 | 0 | 1 | 0 | X | 5 |

| Sheet E | 1 | 2 | 3 | 4 | 5 | 6 | 7 | 8 | 9 | 10 | Final |
|---|---|---|---|---|---|---|---|---|---|---|---|
| Saskatchewan (Wilson) | 1 | 2 | 0 | 5 | 0 | 1 | 2 | X | X | X | 11 |
| British Columbia (Baier) | 0 | 0 | 1 | 0 | 2 | 0 | 0 | X | X | X | 3 |

| Sheet G | 1 | 2 | 3 | 4 | 5 | 6 | 7 | 8 | 9 | 10 | Final |
|---|---|---|---|---|---|---|---|---|---|---|---|
| Prince Edward Island (Gallant) | 1 | 0 | 2 | 0 | 1 | 0 | 1 | 0 | 0 | X | 5 |
| Yukon (Prosko) | 0 | 2 | 0 | 2 | 0 | 2 | 0 | 1 | 0 | X | 7 |

| Sheet I | 1 | 2 | 3 | 4 | 5 | 6 | 7 | 8 | 9 | 10 | Final |
|---|---|---|---|---|---|---|---|---|---|---|---|
| Newfoundland and Labrador (Blandford) | 0 | 0 | 2 | 1 | 0 | 1 | 3 | 2 | X | X | 9 |
| Manitoba (Peters) | 0 | 0 | 0 | 0 | 2 | 0 | 0 | 0 | X | X | 2 |

| Sheet L | 1 | 2 | 3 | 4 | 5 | 6 | 7 | 8 | 9 | 10 | Final |
|---|---|---|---|---|---|---|---|---|---|---|---|
| New Brunswick (Sherrard) | 2 | 0 | 4 | 3 | 1 | 2 | X | X | X | X | 12 |
| Nova Scotia (Christianson) | 0 | 2 | 0 | 0 | 0 | 0 | X | X | X | X | 2 |

==== Draw 6 ====
| Sheet B | 1 | 2 | 3 | 4 | 5 | 6 | 7 | 8 | 9 | 10 | Final |
|---|---|---|---|---|---|---|---|---|---|---|---|
| Ontario (Epping) | 2 | 3 | 0 | 0 | 0 | 0 | 1 | 0 | 2 | X | 8 |
| Prince Edward Island (Gallant) | 0 | 0 | 2 | 0 | 0 | 0 | 0 | 1 | 0 | X | 3 |

| Sheet D | 1 | 2 | 3 | 4 | 5 | 6 | 7 | 8 | 9 | 10 | Final |
|---|---|---|---|---|---|---|---|---|---|---|---|
| Yukon (Prosko) | 0 | 1 | 0 | 1 | 0 | 1 | 0 | 0 | X | X | 3 |
| Newfoundland and Labrador (Blandford) | 2 | 0 | 4 | 0 | 1 | 0 | 0 | 2 | X | X | 9 |

| Sheet E | 1 | 2 | 3 | 4 | 5 | 6 | 7 | 8 | 9 | 10 | Final |
|---|---|---|---|---|---|---|---|---|---|---|---|
| Northwest Territories (Borden) | 0 | 1 | 0 | 1 | 0 | 2 | 0 | 1 | X | X | 5 |
| New Brunswick (Sherrard) | 3 | 0 | 2 | 0 | 2 | 0 | 2 | 0 | X | X | 9 |

| Sheet H | 1 | 2 | 3 | 4 | 5 | 6 | 7 | 8 | 9 | 10 | Final |
|---|---|---|---|---|---|---|---|---|---|---|---|
| British Columbia (Baier) | 1 | 0 | 2 | 0 | 1 | 1 | 0 | 1 | 1 | 1 | 8 |
| Quebec (Crete) | 0 | 1 | 0 | 1 | 0 | 0 | 2 | 0 | 0 | 0 | 4 |

| Sheet I | 1 | 2 | 3 | 4 | 5 | 6 | 7 | 8 | 9 | 10 | Final |
|---|---|---|---|---|---|---|---|---|---|---|---|
| Nova Scotia (Christianson) | 1 | 0 | 0 | 2 | 1 | 0 | 0 | 0 | 2 | X | 6 |
| Alberta (Schille) | 0 | 0 | 2 | 0 | 0 | 0 | 2 | 0 | 0 | X | 4 |

| Sheet L | 1 | 2 | 3 | 4 | 5 | 6 | 7 | 8 | 9 | 10 | 11 | Final |
|---|---|---|---|---|---|---|---|---|---|---|---|---|
| Northern Ontario (Morphet) | 2 | 0 | 0 | 1 | 0 | 1 | 0 | 2 | 0 | 0 | 1 | 7 |
| Saskatchewan (Wilson) | 0 | 2 | 1 | 0 | 1 | 0 | 1 | 0 | 0 | 1 | 0 | 6 |

==== Draw 7 ====
| Sheet A | 1 | 2 | 3 | 4 | 5 | 6 | 7 | 8 | 9 | 10 | 11 | Final |
|---|---|---|---|---|---|---|---|---|---|---|---|---|
| Yukon (Prosko) | 1 | 1 | 2 | 0 | 0 | 0 | 1 | 0 | 0 | 0 | 1 | 6 |
| Nova Scotia (Christianson) | 0 | 0 | 0 | 1 | 0 | 0 | 0 | 1 | 1 | 2 | 0 | 5 |

| Sheet D | 1 | 2 | 3 | 4 | 5 | 6 | 7 | 8 | 9 | 10 | Final |
|---|---|---|---|---|---|---|---|---|---|---|---|
| Saskatchewan (Wilson) | 2 | 0 | 1 | 2 | 3 | 0 | X | X | X | X | 8 |
| Alberta (Schille) | 0 | 1 | 0 | 0 | 0 | 1 | X | X | X | X | 2 |

| Sheet E | 1 | 2 | 3 | 4 | 5 | 6 | 7 | 8 | 9 | 10 | Final |
|---|---|---|---|---|---|---|---|---|---|---|---|
| Quebec (Crete) | 0 | 0 | 2 | 0 | 1 | 0 | 0 | 0 | 0 | 0 | 3 |
| Northern Ontario (Morphet) | 0 | 0 | 0 | 1 | 0 | 1 | 1 | 0 | 1 | 2 | 6 |

| Sheet G | 1 | 2 | 3 | 4 | 5 | 6 | 7 | 8 | 9 | 10 | Final |
|---|---|---|---|---|---|---|---|---|---|---|---|
| Newfoundland and Labrador (Blandford) | 2 | 1 | 2 | 2 | 0 | 0 | 1 | 1 | X | X | 9 |
| Northwest Territories (Borden) | 0 | 0 | 0 | 0 | 1 | 0 | 0 | 0 | X | X | 1 |

| Sheet I | 1 | 2 | 3 | 4 | 5 | 6 | 7 | 8 | 9 | 10 | Final |
|---|---|---|---|---|---|---|---|---|---|---|---|
| British Columbia (Baier) | 1 | 0 | 0 | 0 | 0 | 0 | 3 | 0 | X | X | 4 |
| New Brunswick (Sherrard) | 0 | 2 | 1 | 1 | 0 | 4 | 0 | 2 | X | X | 10 |

| Sheet L | 1 | 2 | 3 | 4 | 5 | 6 | 7 | 8 | 9 | 10 | Final |
|---|---|---|---|---|---|---|---|---|---|---|---|
| Prince Edward Island (Gallant) | 0 | 0 | 2 | 0 | 1 | 0 | 0 | 3 | 0 | 2 | 8 |
| Manitoba (Peters) | 1 | 1 | 0 | 1 | 0 | 2 | 1 | 0 | 1 | 0 | 7 |

==== Draw 8 ====
| Sheet B | 1 | 2 | 3 | 4 | 5 | 6 | 7 | 8 | 9 | 10 | Final |
|---|---|---|---|---|---|---|---|---|---|---|---|
| Northwest Territories (Borden) | 0 | 2 | 0 | 0 | 0 | 3 | 0 | 0 | 1 | X | 6 |
| British Columbia (Baier) | 1 | 0 | 3 | 2 | 0 | 0 | 2 | 0 | 0 | X | 8 |

| Sheet C | 1 | 2 | 3 | 4 | 5 | 6 | 7 | 8 | 9 | 10 | Final |
|---|---|---|---|---|---|---|---|---|---|---|---|
| Prince Edward Island (Gallant) | 1 | 0 | 1 | 0 | 0 | 1 | 1 | 0 | 3 | 0 | 7 |
| Northern Ontario (Morphet) | 0 | 1 | 0 | 0 | 1 | 0 | 0 | 3 | 0 | 3 | 8 |

| Sheet F | 1 | 2 | 3 | 4 | 5 | 6 | 7 | 8 | 9 | 10 | Final |
|---|---|---|---|---|---|---|---|---|---|---|---|
| Saskatchewan (Wilson) | 1 | 0 | 1 | 0 | 0 | 3 | 1 | 0 | 3 | X | 9 |
| Nova Scotia (Christianson) | 0 | 2 | 0 | 2 | 1 | 0 | 0 | 1 | 0 | X | 6 |

| Sheet H | 1 | 2 | 3 | 4 | 5 | 6 | 7 | 8 | 9 | 10 | 11 | Final |
|---|---|---|---|---|---|---|---|---|---|---|---|---|
| New Brunswick (Sherrard) | 0 | 2 | 0 | 3 | 0 | 1 | 0 | 0 | 0 | 0 | 1 | 7 |
| Ontario (Epping) | 1 | 0 | 1 | 0 | 1 | 0 | 0 | 2 | 0 | 1 | 0 | 6 |

| Sheet J | 1 | 2 | 3 | 4 | 5 | 6 | 7 | 8 | 9 | 10 | Final |
|---|---|---|---|---|---|---|---|---|---|---|---|
| Manitoba (Peters) | 2 | 0 | 0 | 3 | 0 | 4 | 0 | 1 | X | X | 10 |
| Quebec (Crete) | 0 | 1 | 2 | 0 | 1 | 0 | 0 | 0 | X | X | 4 |

| Sheet L | 1 | 2 | 3 | 4 | 5 | 6 | 7 | 8 | 9 | 10 | Final |
|---|---|---|---|---|---|---|---|---|---|---|---|
| Alberta (Schille) | 0 | 3 | 0 | 2 | 0 | 1 | 0 | 1 | 2 | X | 9 |
| Newfoundland and Labrador (Blandford) | 1 | 0 | 2 | 0 | 1 | 0 | 3 | 0 | 0 | X | 7 |

==== Draw 9 ====
| Sheet A | 1 | 2 | 3 | 4 | 5 | 6 | 7 | 8 | 9 | 10 | Final |
|---|---|---|---|---|---|---|---|---|---|---|---|
| Quebec (Crete) | 3 | 0 | 1 | 0 | 0 | 0 | 0 | 0 | X | X | 4 |
| Newfoundland and Labrador (Blandford) | 0 | 1 | 0 | 2 | 3 | 0 | 3 | 0 | X | X | 9 |

| Sheet D | 1 | 2 | 3 | 4 | 5 | 6 | 7 | 8 | 9 | 10 | Final |
|---|---|---|---|---|---|---|---|---|---|---|---|
| Northwest Territories (Borden) | 1 | 0 | 1 | 0 | 2 | 1 | 2 | 0 | 2 | X | 9 |
| Nova Scotia (Christianson) | 0 | 1 | 0 | 2 | 0 | 0 | 0 | 1 | 0 | X | 4 |

| Sheet F | 1 | 2 | 3 | 4 | 5 | 6 | 7 | 8 | 9 | 10 | Final |
|---|---|---|---|---|---|---|---|---|---|---|---|
| British Columbia (Baier) | 1 | 0 | 0 | 1 | 0 | 3 | 0 | 0 | 2 | X | 7 |
| Alberta (Schille) | 0 | 1 | 1 | 0 | 0 | 0 | 2 | 0 | 0 | X | 4 |

| Sheet H | 1 | 2 | 3 | 4 | 5 | 6 | 7 | 8 | 9 | 10 | Final |
|---|---|---|---|---|---|---|---|---|---|---|---|
| Manitoba (Peters) | 0 | 1 | 1 | 0 | 1 | 0 | 4 | 2 | X | X | 9 |
| Saskatchewan (Wilson) | 1 | 0 | 0 | 1 | 0 | 3 | 0 | 0 | X | X | 5 |

| Sheet J | 1 | 2 | 3 | 4 | 5 | 6 | 7 | 8 | 9 | 10 | Final |
|---|---|---|---|---|---|---|---|---|---|---|---|
| Northern Ontario (Morphet) | 1 | 0 | 1 | 0 | 0 | 1 | 0 | 0 | X | X | 3 |
| Ontario (Epping) | 0 | 2 | 0 | 3 | 0 | 0 | 2 | 2 | X | X | 9 |

| Sheet K | 1 | 2 | 3 | 4 | 5 | 6 | 7 | 8 | 9 | 10 | Final |
|---|---|---|---|---|---|---|---|---|---|---|---|
| New Brunswick (Sherrard) | 0 | 2 | 0 | 0 | 3 | 1 | 0 | 4 | X | X | 10 |
| Yukon (Prosko) | 0 | 0 | 0 | 1 | 0 | 0 | 1 | 0 | X | X | 2 |

==== Draw 10 ====
| Sheet A | 1 | 2 | 3 | 4 | 5 | 6 | 7 | 8 | 9 | 10 | Final |
|---|---|---|---|---|---|---|---|---|---|---|---|
| Ontario (Epping) | 0 | 0 | 0 | 1 | 0 | 1 | 0 | 2 | 0 | X | 4 |
| Alberta (Schille) | 0 | 0 | 1 | 0 | 1 | 0 | 4 | 0 | 2 | X | 8 |

| Sheet D | 1 | 2 | 3 | 4 | 5 | 6 | 7 | 8 | 9 | 10 | Final |
|---|---|---|---|---|---|---|---|---|---|---|---|
| British Columbia (Baier) | 0 | 1 | 0 | 0 | 0 | 0 | 1 | 0 | 0 | X | 2 |
| Manitoba (Peters) | 0 | 0 | 0 | 0 | 1 | 1 | 0 | 3 | 4 | X | 9 |

| Sheet F | 1 | 2 | 3 | 4 | 5 | 6 | 7 | 8 | 9 | 10 | Final |
|---|---|---|---|---|---|---|---|---|---|---|---|
| Newfoundland and Labrador (Blandford) | 0 | 2 | 0 | 1 | 0 | 0 | 3 | 0 | 1 | 0 | 7 |
| New Brunswick (Sherrard) | 1 | 0 | 0 | 0 | 2 | 0 | 0 | 1 | 0 | 0 | 4 |

| Sheet G | 1 | 2 | 3 | 4 | 5 | 6 | 7 | 8 | 9 | 10 | Final |
|---|---|---|---|---|---|---|---|---|---|---|---|
| Yukon (Prosko) | 1 | 0 | 1 | 0 | 0 | 0 | X | X | X | X | 2 |
| Quebec (Crete) | 0 | 3 | 0 | 2 | 1 | 2 | X | X | X | X | 8 |

| Sheet J | 1 | 2 | 3 | 4 | 5 | 6 | 7 | 8 | 9 | 10 | Final |
|---|---|---|---|---|---|---|---|---|---|---|---|
| Saskatchewan (Wilson) | 2 | 2 | 0 | 1 | 0 | 3 | X | X | X | X | 8 |
| Northwest Territories (Borden) | 0 | 0 | 0 | 0 | 0 | 0 | X | X | X | X | 0 |

| Sheet K | 1 | 2 | 3 | 4 | 5 | 6 | 7 | 8 | 9 | 10 | Final |
|---|---|---|---|---|---|---|---|---|---|---|---|
| Nova Scotia (Christianson) | 0 | 1 | 0 | 1 | 0 | 1 | 1 | 0 | 2 | 0 | 6 |
| Prince Edward Island (Gallant) | 0 | 0 | 2 | 0 | 2 | 0 | 0 | 2 | 0 | 1 | 7 |

==== Draw 11 ====
| Sheet A | 1 | 2 | 3 | 4 | 5 | 6 | 7 | 8 | 9 | 10 | Final |
|---|---|---|---|---|---|---|---|---|---|---|---|
| Northwest Territories (Borden) | 0 | 1 | 0 | 0 | 0 | 0 | 0 | X | X | X | 1 |
| Manitoba (Peters) | 0 | 0 | 4 | 0 | 0 | 1 | 2 | X | X | X | 7 |

| Sheet C | 1 | 2 | 3 | 4 | 5 | 6 | 7 | 8 | 9 | 10 | Final |
|---|---|---|---|---|---|---|---|---|---|---|---|
| Alberta (Schille) | 5 | 1 | 1 | 0 | 0 | 2 | X | X | X | X | 9 |
| Yukon (Prosko) | 0 | 0 | 0 | 0 | 1 | 0 | X | X | X | X | 1 |

| Sheet F | 1 | 2 | 3 | 4 | 5 | 6 | 7 | 8 | 9 | 10 | Final |
|---|---|---|---|---|---|---|---|---|---|---|---|
| Prince Edward Island (Gallant) | 0 | 0 | 3 | 0 | 0 | 1 | 0 | 0 | 0 | X | 4 |
| Quebec (Crete) | 0 | 0 | 0 | 3 | 2 | 0 | 2 | 0 | 0 | X | 7 |

| Sheet G | 1 | 2 | 3 | 4 | 5 | 6 | 7 | 8 | 9 | 10 | Final |
|---|---|---|---|---|---|---|---|---|---|---|---|
| New Brunswick (Sherrard) | 2 | 0 | 1 | 0 | 1 | 0 | 0 | 2 | 0 | 1 | 7 |
| Northern Ontario (Morphet) | 0 | 1 | 0 | 1 | 0 | 1 | 0 | 0 | 2 | 0 | 5 |

| Sheet J | 1 | 2 | 3 | 4 | 5 | 6 | 7 | 8 | 9 | 10 | Final |
|---|---|---|---|---|---|---|---|---|---|---|---|
| Nova Scotia (Christianson) | 0 | 0 | 0 | 2 | 0 | 1 | 0 | 2 | 0 | 1 | 6 |
| British Columbia (Baier) | 1 | 0 | 1 | 0 | 1 | 0 | 1 | 0 | 1 | 0 | 5 |

| Sheet K | 1 | 2 | 3 | 4 | 5 | 6 | 7 | 8 | 9 | 10 | Final |
|---|---|---|---|---|---|---|---|---|---|---|---|
| Ontario (Epping) | 2 | 0 | 0 | 0 | 2 | 1 | 1 | 0 | 1 | X | 7 |
| Newfoundland and Labrador (Blandford) | 0 | 2 | 1 | 1 | 0 | 0 | 0 | 1 | 0 | X | 5 |

==== Draw 12 ====
| Sheet B | 1 | 2 | 3 | 4 | 5 | 6 | 7 | 8 | 9 | 10 | Final |
|---|---|---|---|---|---|---|---|---|---|---|---|
| Yukon (Prosko) | 0 | 2 | 0 | 0 | 0 | 1 | 0 | 0 | 0 | X | 3 |
| British Columbia (Baier) | 1 | 0 | 0 | 0 | 1 | 0 | 2 | 1 | 1 | X | 6 |

| Sheet C | 1 | 2 | 3 | 4 | 5 | 6 | 7 | 8 | 9 | 10 | Final |
|---|---|---|---|---|---|---|---|---|---|---|---|
| Newfoundland and Labrador (Blandford) | 2 | 0 | 0 | 1 | 0 | 0 | 2 | 1 | 0 | X | 6 |
| Prince Edward Island (Gallant) | 0 | 1 | 1 | 0 | 0 | 1 | 0 | 0 | 1 | X | 4 |

| Sheet F | 1 | 2 | 3 | 4 | 5 | 6 | 7 | 8 | 9 | 10 | Final |
|---|---|---|---|---|---|---|---|---|---|---|---|
| Northwest Territories (Borden) | 0 | 1 | 0 | 1 | 0 | 0 | 1 | 0 | 1 | X | 4 |
| Northern Ontario (Morphet) | 0 | 0 | 2 | 0 | 2 | 0 | 0 | 2 | 0 | X | 6 |

| Sheet G | 1 | 2 | 3 | 4 | 5 | 6 | 7 | 8 | 9 | 10 | Final |
|---|---|---|---|---|---|---|---|---|---|---|---|
| Saskatchewan (Wilson) | 2 | 0 | 1 | 0 | 0 | 2 | 1 | 0 | 0 | 0 | 6 |
| Ontario (Epping) | 0 | 1 | 0 | 2 | 1 | 0 | 0 | 1 | 0 | 3 | 8 |

| Sheet I | 1 | 2 | 3 | 4 | 5 | 6 | 7 | 8 | 9 | 10 | Final |
|---|---|---|---|---|---|---|---|---|---|---|---|
| Manitoba (Peters) | 1 | 0 | 3 | 0 | 2 | 0 | 0 | 2 | 0 | 0 | 8 |
| New Brunswick (Sherrard) | 0 | 2 | 0 | 1 | 0 | 0 | 1 | 0 | 2 | 1 | 7 |

| Sheet K | 1 | 2 | 3 | 4 | 5 | 6 | 7 | 8 | 9 | 10 | Final |
|---|---|---|---|---|---|---|---|---|---|---|---|
| Quebec (Crete) | 1 | 0 | 1 | 0 | 0 | 0 | 0 | X | X | X | 2 |
| Alberta (Schille) | 0 | 2 | 0 | 2 | 4 | 0 | 0 | X | X | X | 8 |

==== Draw 13 ====
| Sheet B | 1 | 2 | 3 | 4 | 5 | 6 | 7 | 8 | 9 | 10 | Final |
|---|---|---|---|---|---|---|---|---|---|---|---|
| Alberta (Schille) | 0 | 0 | 1 | 0 | 0 | 0 | 0 | 0 | 0 | X | 1 |
| New Brunswick (Sherrard) | 0 | 0 | 0 | 1 | 0 | 1 | 1 | 1 | 0 | X | 4 |

| Sheet C | 1 | 2 | 3 | 4 | 5 | 6 | 7 | 8 | 9 | 10 | Final |
|---|---|---|---|---|---|---|---|---|---|---|---|
| Quebec (Crete) | 0 | 0 | 3 | 0 | 1 | 0 | 2 | 0 | 2 | X | 8 |
| Nova Scotia (Christianson) | 0 | 0 | 0 | 1 | 0 | 1 | 0 | 1 | 0 | X | 3 |

| Sheet F | 1 | 2 | 3 | 4 | 5 | 6 | 7 | 8 | 9 | 10 | 11 | Final |
|---|---|---|---|---|---|---|---|---|---|---|---|---|
| Manitoba (Peters) | 0 | 0 | 2 | 0 | 1 | 0 | 1 | 0 | 0 | 1 | 1 | 6 |
| Ontario (Epping) | 1 | 1 | 0 | 1 | 0 | 1 | 0 | 1 | 0 | 0 | 0 | 5 |

| Sheet H | 1 | 2 | 3 | 4 | 5 | 6 | 7 | 8 | 9 | 10 | Final |
|---|---|---|---|---|---|---|---|---|---|---|---|
| British Columbia (Baier) | 0 | 0 | 0 | 1 | 1 | 0 | 1 | 0 | 0 | 0 | 3 |
| Newfoundland and Labrador (Blandford) | 0 | 0 | 2 | 0 | 0 | 0 | 0 | 2 | 0 | 2 | 6 |

| Sheet I | 1 | 2 | 3 | 4 | 5 | 6 | 7 | 8 | 9 | 10 | Final |
|---|---|---|---|---|---|---|---|---|---|---|---|
| Prince Edward Island (Gallant) | 1 | 0 | 3 | 0 | 1 | 0 | 2 | 0 | 2 | 0 | 9 |
| Saskatchewan (Wilson) | 0 | 2 | 0 | 2 | 0 | 1 | 0 | 2 | 0 | 3 | 10 |

| Sheet L | 1 | 2 | 3 | 4 | 5 | 6 | 7 | 8 | 9 | 10 | Final |
|---|---|---|---|---|---|---|---|---|---|---|---|
| Northern Ontario (Morphet) | 3 | 0 | 4 | 4 | 0 | 1 | X | X | X | X | 12 |
| Yukon (Prosko) | 0 | 1 | 0 | 0 | 1 | 0 | X | X | X | X | 2 |

=== Playoffs ===
| Semifinal | | Final |
| Manitoba | 7 |
| New Brunswick | 8 | Newfoundland and Labrador | 5 |
| | | New Brunswick | 6 |

==== Semifinal ====
| Sheet K | 1 | 2 | 3 | 4 | 5 | 6 | 7 | 8 | 9 | 10 | Final |
|---|---|---|---|---|---|---|---|---|---|---|---|
| New Brunswick (Sherrard) | 0 | 1 | 1 | 0 | 2 | 0 | 1 | 0 | 2 | 1 | 8 |
| Manitoba (Peters) | 1 | 0 | 0 | 2 | 0 | 3 | 0 | 1 | 0 | 0 | 7 |

Player percentages
| New Brunswick | | Manitoba | |
|---|---|---|---|
| Jared Bezanson | 81% | Marc Lacroix | 86% |
| Darren Roach | 57% | Brendan Neufeld | 80% |
| Jason Roach | 65% | Matthew Lacroix | 70% |
| Ryan Sherrard | 69% | Daley Peters | 65% |
| Total | 68% | Total | 75% |

==== Final ====
| Sheet D | 1 | 2 | 3 | 4 | 5 | 6 | 7 | 8 | 9 | 10 | Final |
|---|---|---|---|---|---|---|---|---|---|---|---|
| Newfoundland and Labrador (Blandford) | 0 | 1 | 0 | 1 | 0 | 0 | 3 | 0 | 0 | 0 | 5 |
| New Brunswick (Sherrard) | 0 | 0 | 2 | 0 | 3 | 0 | 0 | 0 | 0 | 1 | 6 |

Player percentages
| Newfoundland and Labrador | | New Brunswick | |
|---|---|---|---|
| Andrew Mercer | 73% | Jared Bezanson | 80% |
| Paul Steeves | 71% | Darren Roach | 79% |
| Trent Skanes | 65% | Jason Roach | 79% |
| Matthew Blandford | 78% | Ryan Sherrard | 80% |
| Total | 72% | Total | 79% |

== Women's ==
=== Teams ===
| Province / Territory | Skip | Third | Second | Lead |
|---|---|---|---|---|
| Alberta | Megan Kirk | Teryn Hamilton | Jackie Peat | Lace Dupont |
| British Columbia | Kristen Recksiedler | Mila Hockley | Christine Miller | Kelsey Steiger |
| Manitoba | Tasha Hunter | Joce Foreman | Karen Hodgson | Roxie Trembath |
| New Brunswick | Andrea Kelly | Kristen MacDiarmid | Jodie deSolla | Lianne Sobey |
| Newfoundland and Labrador | Stacie Devereaux | Stephanie Guzzwell | Stephanie LeDrew | Sarah Paul |
| Northern Ontario | Shana Ketonen | Liane Fossum | Larissa Stevens | Michelle Desando |
| Northwest Territories | Kristan Thompson | Kate Jefferson | Leslie Merrithew | Francesca Marrai |
| Nova Scotia | Jill Mouzar | Paige Mattie | Blisse Comstock | Chloe Comstock |
| Ontario | Kelly Cochrane | Anna Piekarski | Jackie Craig | Ainsley Galbraith |
| Prince Edward Island | Meaghan Hughes | Sinead Dolan | Michala Robison | Erika Nabuurs |
| Quebec | Marie Cantin | Anne-Marie Filteau | Amélie Blais | Julie Cantin |
| Saskatchewan | Teejay Surik | Hailey Surik | Janelle Lemon | Allison Gerhardt |
| Yukon | Ladene Shaw | Stacey Sellars | Jessie Leschart | Mandi Shaw |

=== Standings ===
| Locale | Skip | W | L |
|---|---|---|---|
| Nova Scotia | Jill Mouzar | 9 | 3 |
| Quebec | Marie Cantin | 9 | 3 |
| New Brunswick | Andrea Kelly | 9 | 3 |
| Saskatchewan | Teejay Surik | 8 | 4 |
| Newfoundland and Labrador | Stacie Devereaux | 8 | 4 |
| British Columbia | Kristen Recksiedler | 7 | 5 |
| Manitoba | Tasha Hunter | 5 | 7 |
| Prince Edward Island | Meaghan Hughes | 5 | 7 |
| Ontario | Kelly Cochrane | 5 | 7 |
| Northern Ontario | Shana Ketonen | 4 | 8 |
| Alberta | Megan Kirk | 4 | 8 |
| Yukon | Ladene Shaw | 3 | 9 |
| Northwest Territories | Kristan Thompson | 2 | 10 |

=== Results ===
==== Draw 1 ====
| Sheet A | 1 | 2 | 3 | 4 | 5 | 6 | 7 | 8 | 9 | 10 | Final |
|---|---|---|---|---|---|---|---|---|---|---|---|
| Nova Scotia (Mouzar) | 0 | 0 | 1 | 0 | 1 | 1 | 1 | 1 | 0 | 0 | 5 |
| Manitoba (Hunter) | 0 | 0 | 0 | 1 | 0 | 0 | 0 | 0 | 2 | 1 | 4 |

| Sheet C | 1 | 2 | 3 | 4 | 5 | 6 | 7 | 8 | 9 | 10 | Final |
|---|---|---|---|---|---|---|---|---|---|---|---|
| Northern Ontario (Ketonen) | 0 | 0 | 0 | 2 | 0 | 1 | 0 | 1 | 0 | X | 4 |
| British Columbia (Recksiedler) | 0 | 0 | 2 | 0 | 1 | 0 | 1 | 0 | 2 | X | 6 |

| Sheet E | 1 | 2 | 3 | 4 | 5 | 6 | 7 | 8 | 9 | 10 | Final |
|---|---|---|---|---|---|---|---|---|---|---|---|
| Quebec (Cantin) | 1 | 0 | 2 | 0 | 2 | 1 | 1 | 0 | 2 | X | 9 |
| New Brunswick (Kelly) | 0 | 2 | 0 | 2 | 0 | 0 | 0 | 1 | 0 | X | 5 |

| Sheet G | 1 | 2 | 3 | 4 | 5 | 6 | 7 | 8 | 9 | 10 | Final |
|---|---|---|---|---|---|---|---|---|---|---|---|
| Northwest Territories (Thompson) | 3 | 0 | 2 | 0 | 2 | 0 | 0 | 1 | 0 | X | 8 |
| Prince Edward Island (Hughes) | 0 | 3 | 0 | 2 | 0 | 2 | 1 | 0 | 2 | X | 10 |

| Sheet I | 1 | 2 | 3 | 4 | 5 | 6 | 7 | 8 | 9 | 10 | Final |
|---|---|---|---|---|---|---|---|---|---|---|---|
| Newfoundland and Labrador (Devereaux) | 0 | 0 | 0 | 3 | 1 | 1 | 0 | 0 | 0 | 0 | 5 |
| Saskatchewan (Surik) | 0 | 0 | 1 | 0 | 0 | 0 | 2 | 1 | 1 | 1 | 6 |

| Sheet K | 1 | 2 | 3 | 4 | 5 | 6 | 7 | 8 | 9 | 10 | Final |
|---|---|---|---|---|---|---|---|---|---|---|---|
| Ontario (Cochrane) | 2 | 0 | 1 | 1 | 0 | 3 | 0 | 2 | 0 | X | 9 |
| Yukon (Shaw) | 0 | 0 | 0 | 0 | 1 | 0 | 1 | 0 | 1 | X | 3 |

==== Draw 2 ====
| Sheet B | 1 | 2 | 3 | 4 | 5 | 6 | 7 | 8 | 9 | 10 | Final |
|---|---|---|---|---|---|---|---|---|---|---|---|
| Yukon (Shaw) | 1 | 0 | 0 | 1 | 0 | 0 | 0 | 0 | X | X | 2 |
| Saskatchewan (Surik) | 0 | 2 | 2 | 0 | 1 | 2 | 1 | 1 | X | X | 9 |

| Sheet D | 1 | 2 | 3 | 4 | 5 | 6 | 7 | 8 | 9 | 10 | Final |
|---|---|---|---|---|---|---|---|---|---|---|---|
| Nova Scotia (Mouzar) | 0 | 1 | 0 | 0 | 1 | 0 | 1 | 0 | X | X | 3 |
| Newfoundland and Labrador (Devereaux) | 1 | 0 | 3 | 3 | 0 | 1 | 0 | 1 | X | X | 9 |

| Sheet F | 1 | 2 | 3 | 4 | 5 | 6 | 7 | 8 | 9 | 10 | 11 | Final |
|---|---|---|---|---|---|---|---|---|---|---|---|---|
| Alberta (Kirk) | 1 | 0 | 0 | 1 | 0 | 0 | 0 | 1 | 1 | 2 | 1 | 7 |
| Northwest Territories (Thompson) | 0 | 1 | 1 | 0 | 1 | 2 | 1 | 0 | 0 | 0 | 0 | 6 |

| Sheet H | 1 | 2 | 3 | 4 | 5 | 6 | 7 | 8 | 9 | 10 | Final |
|---|---|---|---|---|---|---|---|---|---|---|---|
| Northern Ontario (Ketonen) | 0 | 0 | 1 | 0 | 1 | 0 | 4 | 2 | 1 | X | 9 |
| Manitoba (Hunter) | 0 | 0 | 0 | 1 | 0 | 1 | 0 | 0 | 0 | X | 2 |

| Sheet J | 1 | 2 | 3 | 4 | 5 | 6 | 7 | 8 | 9 | 10 | Final |
|---|---|---|---|---|---|---|---|---|---|---|---|
| Ontario (Cochrane) | 0 | 0 | 0 | 1 | 0 | 0 | 2 | 1 | 0 | X | 4 |
| Quebec (Cantin) | 0 | 1 | 2 | 0 | 0 | 1 | 0 | 0 | 3 | X | 7 |

| Sheet L | 1 | 2 | 3 | 4 | 5 | 6 | 7 | 8 | 9 | 10 | Final |
|---|---|---|---|---|---|---|---|---|---|---|---|
| New Brunswick (Kelly) | 0 | 3 | 2 | 0 | 0 | 0 | 0 | 1 | 2 | 2 | 10 |
| Prince Edward Island (Hughes) | 1 | 0 | 0 | 3 | 2 | 2 | 1 | 0 | 0 | 0 | 9 |

==== Draw 3 ====
| Sheet B | 1 | 2 | 3 | 4 | 5 | 6 | 7 | 8 | 9 | 10 | Final |
|---|---|---|---|---|---|---|---|---|---|---|---|
| Prince Edward Island (Hughes) | 0 | 0 | 0 | 1 | 0 | 1 | 0 | 0 | 0 | X | 2 |
| British Columbia (Recksiedler) | 0 | 0 | 0 | 0 | 1 | 0 | 1 | 1 | 1 | X | 4 |

| Sheet D | 1 | 2 | 3 | 4 | 5 | 6 | 7 | 8 | 9 | 10 | 11 | Final |
|---|---|---|---|---|---|---|---|---|---|---|---|---|
| Manitoba (Hunter) | 1 | 0 | 0 | 3 | 0 | 0 | 1 | 0 | 2 | 0 | 1 | 8 |
| Alberta (Kirk) | 0 | 0 | 1 | 0 | 1 | 0 | 0 | 4 | 0 | 1 | 0 | 7 |

| Sheet F | 1 | 2 | 3 | 4 | 5 | 6 | 7 | 8 | 9 | 10 | Final |
|---|---|---|---|---|---|---|---|---|---|---|---|
| Nova Scotia (Mouzar) | 1 | 1 | 1 | 0 | 0 | 1 | 0 | 2 | 1 | X | 7 |
| Ontario (Cochrane) | 0 | 0 | 0 | 0 | 1 | 0 | 3 | 0 | 0 | X | 4 |

| Sheet H | 1 | 2 | 3 | 4 | 5 | 6 | 7 | 8 | 9 | 10 | Final |
|---|---|---|---|---|---|---|---|---|---|---|---|
| Saskatchewan (Surik) | 0 | 2 | 2 | 0 | 0 | 0 | 0 | 1 | 0 | X | 5 |
| Quebec (Cantin) | 0 | 0 | 0 | 3 | 1 | 1 | 2 | 0 | 1 | X | 8 |

| Sheet J | 1 | 2 | 3 | 4 | 5 | 6 | 7 | 8 | 9 | 10 | Final |
|---|---|---|---|---|---|---|---|---|---|---|---|
| Yukon (Shaw) | 1 | 0 | 1 | 0 | 2 | 0 | 0 | 2 | 0 | 4 | 10 |
| Northwest Territories (Thompson) | 0 | 0 | 0 | 2 | 0 | 2 | 4 | 0 | 1 | 0 | 9 |

| Sheet L | 1 | 2 | 3 | 4 | 5 | 6 | 7 | 8 | 9 | 10 | Final |
|---|---|---|---|---|---|---|---|---|---|---|---|
| Newfoundland and Labrador (Devereaux) | 2 | 2 | 0 | 0 | 0 | 1 | 1 | 0 | 1 | 0 | 7 |
| Northern Ontario (Ketonen) | 0 | 0 | 1 | 1 | 0 | 0 | 0 | 2 | 0 | 2 | 6 |

==== Draw 4 ====
| Sheet A | 1 | 2 | 3 | 4 | 5 | 6 | 7 | 8 | 9 | 10 | Final |
|---|---|---|---|---|---|---|---|---|---|---|---|
| Quebec (Cantin) | 2 | 2 | 0 | 1 | 0 | 4 | 0 | 2 | X | X | 11 |
| Northwest Territories (Thompson) | 0 | 0 | 1 | 0 | 2 | 0 | 1 | 0 | X | X | 4 |

| Sheet D | 1 | 2 | 3 | 4 | 5 | 6 | 7 | 8 | 9 | 10 | Final |
|---|---|---|---|---|---|---|---|---|---|---|---|
| New Brunswick (Kelly) | 0 | 1 | 0 | 0 | 0 | 2 | 0 | 3 | 3 | X | 9 |
| Saskatchewan (Surik) | 0 | 0 | 0 | 1 | 2 | 0 | 1 | 0 | 0 | X | 4 |

| Sheet F | 1 | 2 | 3 | 4 | 5 | 6 | 7 | 8 | 9 | 10 | Final |
|---|---|---|---|---|---|---|---|---|---|---|---|
| Manitoba (Hunter) | 1 | 0 | 0 | 1 | 0 | 1 | 0 | 2 | 0 | 2 | 7 |
| Yukon (Shaw) | 0 | 1 | 1 | 0 | 1 | 0 | 1 | 0 | 1 | 0 | 5 |

| Sheet G | 1 | 2 | 3 | 4 | 5 | 6 | 7 | 8 | 9 | 10 | Final |
|---|---|---|---|---|---|---|---|---|---|---|---|
| Northern Ontario (Ketonen) | 0 | 1 | 0 | 0 | 1 | 0 | 0 | 1 | 0 | X | 3 |
| Nova Scotia (Mouzar) | 0 | 0 | 2 | 0 | 0 | 2 | 1 | 0 | 1 | X | 6 |

| Sheet I | 1 | 2 | 3 | 4 | 5 | 6 | 7 | 8 | 9 | 10 | Final |
|---|---|---|---|---|---|---|---|---|---|---|---|
| Alberta (Kirk) | 3 | 0 | 1 | 0 | 0 | 0 | 2 | 0 | 2 | X | 8 |
| Prince Edward Island (Hughes) | 0 | 0 | 0 | 1 | 1 | 1 | 0 | 0 | 0 | X | 3 |

| Sheet L | 1 | 2 | 3 | 4 | 5 | 6 | 7 | 8 | 9 | 10 | Final |
|---|---|---|---|---|---|---|---|---|---|---|---|
| British Columbia (Recksiedler) | 0 | 1 | 0 | 0 | 2 | 0 | 2 | 0 | 0 | X | 5 |
| Ontario (Cochrane) | 2 | 0 | 3 | 0 | 0 | 1 | 0 | 2 | 1 | X | 9 |

==== Draw 5 ====
| Sheet B | 1 | 2 | 3 | 4 | 5 | 6 | 7 | 8 | 9 | 10 | Final |
|---|---|---|---|---|---|---|---|---|---|---|---|
| Alberta (Kirk) | 1 | 0 | 1 | 0 | 0 | 0 | 0 | 1 | 0 | 1 | 4 |
| Northern Ontario (Ketonen) | 0 | 0 | 0 | 0 | 1 | 1 | 2 | 0 | 1 | 0 | 5 |

| Sheet D | 1 | 2 | 3 | 4 | 5 | 6 | 7 | 8 | 9 | 10 | Final |
|---|---|---|---|---|---|---|---|---|---|---|---|
| Ontario (Cochrane) | 0 | 3 | 4 | 0 | 0 | 1 | 1 | X | X | X | 9 |
| Northwest Territories (Thompson) | 1 | 0 | 0 | 1 | 1 | 0 | 0 | X | X | X | 3 |

| Sheet F | 1 | 2 | 3 | 4 | 5 | 6 | 7 | 8 | 9 | 10 | Final |
|---|---|---|---|---|---|---|---|---|---|---|---|
| Saskatchewan (Surik) | 0 | 2 | 1 | 0 | 0 | 2 | 1 | 0 | 1 | X | 7 |
| British Columbia (Recksiedler) | 1 | 0 | 0 | 1 | 0 | 0 | 0 | 2 | 0 | X | 4 |

| Sheet H | 1 | 2 | 3 | 4 | 5 | 6 | 7 | 8 | 9 | 10 | Final |
|---|---|---|---|---|---|---|---|---|---|---|---|
| Prince Edward Island (Hughes) | 4 | 1 | 0 | 0 | 1 | 0 | 1 | 1 | 1 | X | 9 |
| Yukon (Shaw) | 0 | 0 | 2 | 1 | 0 | 2 | 0 | 0 | 0 | X | 5 |

| Sheet J | 1 | 2 | 3 | 4 | 5 | 6 | 7 | 8 | 9 | 10 | Final |
|---|---|---|---|---|---|---|---|---|---|---|---|
| Newfoundland and Labrador (Devereaux) | 3 | 2 | 0 | 2 | 1 | 1 | X | X | X | X | 9 |
| Manitoba (Hunter) | 0 | 0 | 1 | 0 | 0 | 0 | X | X | X | X | 1 |

| Sheet K | 1 | 2 | 3 | 4 | 5 | 6 | 7 | 8 | 9 | 10 | Final |
|---|---|---|---|---|---|---|---|---|---|---|---|
| New Brunswick (Kelly) | 1 | 0 | 0 | 1 | 0 | 1 | 0 | 1 | 1 | 0 | 5 |
| Nova Scotia (Mouzar) | 0 | 2 | 0 | 0 | 1 | 0 | 1 | 0 | 0 | 3 | 7 |

==== Draw 6 ====
| Sheet A | 1 | 2 | 3 | 4 | 5 | 6 | 7 | 8 | 9 | 10 | 11 | 12 | Final |
| Ontario (Cochrane) | 0 | 0 | 3 | 0 | 2 | 0 | 0 | 0 | 0 | 1 | 0 | 0 | 6 |
| Prince Edward Island (Hughes) | 0 | 1 | 0 | 3 | 0 | 1 | 1 | 0 | 0 | 0 | 0 | 1 | 7 |

| Sheet C | 1 | 2 | 3 | 4 | 5 | 6 | 7 | 8 | 9 | 10 | Final |
|---|---|---|---|---|---|---|---|---|---|---|---|
| Yukon (Shaw) | 0 | 0 | 1 | 0 | 1 | 0 | 2 | 4 | 0 | 0 | 8 |
| Newfoundland and Labrador (Devereaux) | 0 | 0 | 0 | 3 | 0 | 1 | 0 | 0 | 1 | 2 | 7 |

| Sheet F | 1 | 2 | 3 | 4 | 5 | 6 | 7 | 8 | 9 | 10 | Final |
|---|---|---|---|---|---|---|---|---|---|---|---|
| Northwest Territories (Thompson) | 0 | 1 | 0 | 1 | 1 | 0 | 1 | 1 | 0 | X | 5 |
| New Brunswick (Kelly) | 1 | 0 | 3 | 0 | 0 | 1 | 0 | 0 | 3 | X | 8 |

| Sheet G | 1 | 2 | 3 | 4 | 5 | 6 | 7 | 8 | 9 | 10 | Final |
|---|---|---|---|---|---|---|---|---|---|---|---|
| British Columbia (Recksiedler) | 1 | 0 | 2 | 0 | 1 | 0 | 1 | 1 | 0 | 0 | 6 |
| Quebec (Cantin) | 0 | 1 | 0 | 0 | 0 | 1 | 0 | 0 | 2 | 1 | 5 |

| Sheet J | 1 | 2 | 3 | 4 | 5 | 6 | 7 | 8 | 9 | 10 | Final |
|---|---|---|---|---|---|---|---|---|---|---|---|
| Nova Scotia (Mouzar) | 0 | 1 | 0 | 4 | 0 | 2 | 2 | X | X | X | 9 |
| Alberta (Kirk) | 0 | 0 | 1 | 0 | 1 | 0 | 0 | X | X | X | 2 |

| Sheet K | 1 | 2 | 3 | 4 | 5 | 6 | 7 | 8 | 9 | 10 | Final |
|---|---|---|---|---|---|---|---|---|---|---|---|
| Northern Ontario (Ketonen) | 0 | 1 | 0 | 1 | 1 | 1 | 0 | 1 | 0 | 2 | 7 |
| Saskatchewan (Surik) | 2 | 0 | 3 | 0 | 0 | 0 | 0 | 0 | 1 | 0 | 6 |

==== Draw 7 ====
| Sheet B | 1 | 2 | 3 | 4 | 5 | 6 | 7 | 8 | 9 | 10 | Final |
|---|---|---|---|---|---|---|---|---|---|---|---|
| Yukon (Shaw) | 1 | 0 | 0 | 1 | 0 | 0 | 0 | X | X | X | 2 |
| Nova Scotia (Mouzar) | 0 | 1 | 3 | 0 | 4 | 0 | 1 | X | X | X | 9 |

| Sheet C | 1 | 2 | 3 | 4 | 5 | 6 | 7 | 8 | 9 | 10 | Final |
|---|---|---|---|---|---|---|---|---|---|---|---|
| Saskatchewan (Surik) | 0 | 1 | 0 | 0 | 0 | 3 | 0 | 0 | 0 | X | 4 |
| Alberta (Kirk) | 0 | 0 | 1 | 0 | 0 | 0 | 0 | 1 | 0 | X | 2 |

| Sheet F | 1 | 2 | 3 | 4 | 5 | 6 | 7 | 8 | 9 | 10 | Final |
|---|---|---|---|---|---|---|---|---|---|---|---|
| Quebec (Cantin) | 2 | 0 | 0 | 2 | 0 | 2 | 1 | 1 | 0 | X | 8 |
| Northern Ontario (Ketonen) | 0 | 0 | 3 | 0 | 2 | 0 | 0 | 0 | 1 | X | 6 |

| Sheet H | 1 | 2 | 3 | 4 | 5 | 6 | 7 | 8 | 9 | 10 | Final |
|---|---|---|---|---|---|---|---|---|---|---|---|
| Newfoundland and Labrador (Devereaux) | 4 | 0 | 0 | 2 | 0 | 2 | 0 | 1 | X | X | 9 |
| Northwest Territories (Thompson) | 0 | 1 | 1 | 0 | 1 | 0 | 1 | 0 | X | X | 4 |

| Sheet J | 1 | 2 | 3 | 4 | 5 | 6 | 7 | 8 | 9 | 10 | Final |
|---|---|---|---|---|---|---|---|---|---|---|---|
| British Columbia (Recksiedler) | 0 | 0 | 0 | 1 | 0 | 2 | 0 | 2 | 0 | 0 | 5 |
| New Brunswick (Kelly) | 0 | 0 | 1 | 0 | 2 | 0 | 1 | 0 | 1 | 2 | 7 |

| Sheet K | 1 | 2 | 3 | 4 | 5 | 6 | 7 | 8 | 9 | 10 | Final |
|---|---|---|---|---|---|---|---|---|---|---|---|
| Prince Edward Island (Hughes) | 0 | 0 | 0 | 1 | 1 | 0 | 1 | 0 | 0 | 0 | 3 |
| Manitoba (Hunter) | 0 | 0 | 0 | 0 | 0 | 2 | 0 | 0 | 1 | 2 | 5 |

==== Draw 8 ====
| Sheet A | 1 | 2 | 3 | 4 | 5 | 6 | 7 | 8 | 9 | 10 | Final |
|---|---|---|---|---|---|---|---|---|---|---|---|
| Northwest Territories (Thompson) | 1 | 1 | 0 | 1 | 0 | 3 | 0 | 0 | 0 | X | 6 |
| British Columbia (Recksiedler) | 0 | 0 | 0 | 0 | 2 | 0 | 1 | 1 | 1 | X | 5 |

| Sheet D | 1 | 2 | 3 | 4 | 5 | 6 | 7 | 8 | 9 | 10 | Final |
|---|---|---|---|---|---|---|---|---|---|---|---|
| Prince Edward Island (Hughes) | 4 | 1 | 0 | 2 | 0 | 0 | 4 | 0 | 3 | X | 14 |
| Northern Ontario (Ketonen) | 0 | 0 | 1 | 0 | 3 | 1 | 0 | 2 | 0 | X | 7 |

| Sheet E | 1 | 2 | 3 | 4 | 5 | 6 | 7 | 8 | 9 | 10 | Final |
|---|---|---|---|---|---|---|---|---|---|---|---|
| Saskatchewan (Surik) | 0 | 0 | 0 | 1 | 0 | 0 | 0 | 0 | 0 | X | 1 |
| Nova Scotia (Mouzar) | 0 | 0 | 0 | 0 | 0 | 2 | 0 | 0 | 1 | X | 3 |

| Sheet G | 1 | 2 | 3 | 4 | 5 | 6 | 7 | 8 | 9 | 10 | Final |
|---|---|---|---|---|---|---|---|---|---|---|---|
| New Brunswick (Kelly) | 2 | 1 | 0 | 0 | 0 | 1 | 0 | 0 | 0 | 1 | 5 |
| Ontario (Cochrane) | 0 | 0 | 1 | 0 | 1 | 0 | 0 | 2 | 0 | 0 | 4 |

| Sheet I | 1 | 2 | 3 | 4 | 5 | 6 | 7 | 8 | 9 | 10 | 11 | Final |
|---|---|---|---|---|---|---|---|---|---|---|---|---|
| Manitoba (Hunter) | 0 | 2 | 0 | 0 | 1 | 0 | 0 | 1 | 0 | 3 | 0 | 7 |
| Quebec (Cantin) | 2 | 0 | 1 | 0 | 0 | 2 | 1 | 0 | 1 | 0 | 1 | 8 |

| Sheet K | 1 | 2 | 3 | 4 | 5 | 6 | 7 | 8 | 9 | 10 | Final |
|---|---|---|---|---|---|---|---|---|---|---|---|
| Alberta (Kirk) | 1 | 2 | 0 | 0 | 1 | 0 | 0 | 2 | 0 | X | 6 |
| Newfoundland and Labrador (Devereaux) | 0 | 0 | 2 | 2 | 0 | 1 | 3 | 0 | 2 | X | 10 |

==== Draw 9 ====
| Sheet B | 1 | 2 | 3 | 4 | 5 | 6 | 7 | 8 | 9 | 10 | Final |
|---|---|---|---|---|---|---|---|---|---|---|---|
| Quebec (Cantin) | 1 | 1 | 1 | 0 | 1 | 0 | 0 | 2 | X | X | 6 |
| Newfoundland and Labrador (Devereaux) | 0 | 0 | 0 | 0 | 0 | 0 | 1 | 0 | X | X | 1 |

| Sheet C | 1 | 2 | 3 | 4 | 5 | 6 | 7 | 8 | 9 | 10 | Final |
|---|---|---|---|---|---|---|---|---|---|---|---|
| Northwest Territories (Thomas) | 0 | 0 | 1 | 0 | 0 | 1 | 0 | 0 | X | X | 2 |
| Nova Scotia (Mouzar) | 2 | 1 | 0 | 1 | 0 | 0 | 1 | 2 | X | X | 7 |

| Sheet E | 1 | 2 | 3 | 4 | 5 | 6 | 7 | 8 | 9 | 10 | Final |
|---|---|---|---|---|---|---|---|---|---|---|---|
| British Columbia (Recksiedler) | 3 | 0 | 0 | 0 | 2 | 0 | 1 | 0 | 0 | 2 | 8 |
| Alberta (Kirk) | 0 | 0 | 1 | 3 | 0 | 0 | 0 | 3 | 0 | 0 | 7 |

| Sheet G | 1 | 2 | 3 | 4 | 5 | 6 | 7 | 8 | 9 | 10 | Final |
|---|---|---|---|---|---|---|---|---|---|---|---|
| Manitoba (Hunter) | 1 | 0 | 0 | 1 | 0 | 0 | 0 | 1 | 1 | 0 | 4 |
| Saskatchewan (Surik) | 0 | 1 | 1 | 0 | 0 | 2 | 0 | 0 | 0 | 1 | 5 |

| Sheet I | 1 | 2 | 3 | 4 | 5 | 6 | 7 | 8 | 9 | 10 | Final |
|---|---|---|---|---|---|---|---|---|---|---|---|
| Northern Ontario (Ketonen) | 3 | 1 | 0 | 1 | 0 | 0 | 0 | 1 | 1 | 1 | 8 |
| Ontario (Cochrane) | 0 | 0 | 2 | 0 | 2 | 1 | 1 | 0 | 0 | 0 | 6 |

| Sheet L | 1 | 2 | 3 | 4 | 5 | 6 | 7 | 8 | 9 | 10 | Final |
|---|---|---|---|---|---|---|---|---|---|---|---|
| New Brunswick (Kelly) | 0 | 0 | 0 | 2 | 0 | 2 | 0 | 0 | 3 | X | 7 |
| Yukon (Shaw) | 0 | 1 | 1 | 0 | 1 | 0 | 1 | 0 | 0 | X | 4 |

==== Draw 10 ====
| Sheet B | 1 | 2 | 3 | 4 | 5 | 6 | 7 | 8 | 9 | 10 | Final |
|---|---|---|---|---|---|---|---|---|---|---|---|
| Ontario (Cochrane) | 2 | 0 | 2 | 0 | 0 | 0 | 2 | 1 | 0 | X | 7 |
| Alberta (Kirk) | 0 | 2 | 0 | 0 | 1 | 0 | 0 | 0 | 1 | X | 4 |

| Sheet C | 1 | 2 | 3 | 4 | 5 | 6 | 7 | 8 | 9 | 10 | Final |
|---|---|---|---|---|---|---|---|---|---|---|---|
| British Columbia (Recksiedler) | 1 | 0 | 0 | 2 | 0 | 2 | 1 | 0 | 1 | X | 7 |
| Manitoba (Hunter) | 0 | 1 | 0 | 0 | 1 | 0 | 0 | 1 | 0 | X | 3 |

| Sheet E | 1 | 2 | 3 | 4 | 5 | 6 | 7 | 8 | 9 | 10 | Final |
|---|---|---|---|---|---|---|---|---|---|---|---|
| Newfoundland and Labrador (Devereaux) | 1 | 0 | 0 | 2 | 1 | 0 | 1 | 0 | 1 | X | 6 |
| New Brunswick (Kelly) | 0 | 0 | 1 | 0 | 0 | 0 | 0 | 1 | 0 | X | 2 |

| Sheet H | 1 | 2 | 3 | 4 | 5 | 6 | 7 | 8 | 9 | 10 | Final |
|---|---|---|---|---|---|---|---|---|---|---|---|
| Yukon (Shaw) | 0 | 0 | 0 | 0 | 1 | 0 | 1 | 0 | 1 | X | 3 |
| Quebec (Cantin) | 0 | 2 | 0 | 0 | 0 | 2 | 0 | 1 | 0 | X | 5 |

| Sheet I | 1 | 2 | 3 | 4 | 5 | 6 | 7 | 8 | 9 | 10 | Final |
|---|---|---|---|---|---|---|---|---|---|---|---|
| Saskatchewan (Surik) | 2 | 1 | 1 | 1 | 1 | 3 | X | X | X | X | 9 |
| Northwest Territories (Thompson) | 0 | 0 | 0 | 0 | 0 | 0 | X | X | X | X | 0 |

| Sheet L | 1 | 2 | 3 | 4 | 5 | 6 | 7 | 8 | 9 | 10 | Final |
|---|---|---|---|---|---|---|---|---|---|---|---|
| Nova Scotia (Mouzar) | 0 | 1 | 1 | 0 | 1 | 0 | 0 | 3 | 0 | 0 | 6 |
| Prince Edward Island (Hughes) | 1 | 0 | 0 | 1 | 0 | 1 | 2 | 0 | 1 | 1 | 7 |

==== Draw 11 ====
| Sheet B | 1 | 2 | 3 | 4 | 5 | 6 | 7 | 8 | 9 | 10 | Final |
|---|---|---|---|---|---|---|---|---|---|---|---|
| Northwest Territories (Thompson) | 1 | 0 | 0 | 0 | 1 | 0 | X | X | X | X | 2 |
| Manitoba (Hunter) | 0 | 0 | 4 | 0 | 0 | 5 | X | X | X | X | 9 |

| Sheet D | 1 | 2 | 3 | 4 | 5 | 6 | 7 | 8 | 9 | 10 | Final |
|---|---|---|---|---|---|---|---|---|---|---|---|
| Alberta (Kirk) | 0 | 0 | 2 | 1 | 0 | 0 | 0 | 1 | 2 | X | 6 |
| Yukon (Shaw) | 0 | 0 | 0 | 0 | 1 | 0 | 1 | 0 | 0 | X | 2 |

| Sheet E | 1 | 2 | 3 | 4 | 5 | 6 | 7 | 8 | 9 | 10 | Final |
|---|---|---|---|---|---|---|---|---|---|---|---|
| Prince Edward Island (Hughes) | 1 | 0 | 1 | 0 | 0 | 1 | 0 | X | X | X | 3 |
| Quebec (Cantin) | 0 | 2 | 0 | 4 | 1 | 0 | 4 | X | X | X | 11 |

| Sheet H | 1 | 2 | 3 | 4 | 5 | 6 | 7 | 8 | 9 | 10 | 11 | Final |
|---|---|---|---|---|---|---|---|---|---|---|---|---|
| New Brunswick (Kelly) | 0 | 0 | 2 | 1 | 2 | 0 | 0 | 0 | 2 | 0 | 1 | 8 |
| Northern Ontario (Ketonen) | 0 | 0 | 0 | 0 | 0 | 2 | 2 | 2 | 0 | 1 | 0 | 7 |

| Sheet I | 1 | 2 | 3 | 4 | 5 | 6 | 7 | 8 | 9 | 10 | Final |
|---|---|---|---|---|---|---|---|---|---|---|---|
| Nova Scotia (Mouzar) | 1 | 0 | 1 | 0 | 0 | 2 | 0 | 0 | 1 | X | 5 |
| British Columbia (Recksiedler) | 0 | 1 | 0 | 1 | 2 | 0 | 2 | 2 | 0 | X | 8 |

| Sheet L | 1 | 2 | 3 | 4 | 5 | 6 | 7 | 8 | 9 | 10 | 11 | Final |
|---|---|---|---|---|---|---|---|---|---|---|---|---|
| Ontario (Cochrane) | 1 | 0 | 1 | 0 | 2 | 0 | 1 | 0 | 1 | 0 | 2 | 8 |
| Newfoundland and Labrador (Devereaux) | 0 | 1 | 0 | 1 | 0 | 1 | 0 | 1 | 0 | 2 | 0 | 6 |

==== Draw 12 ====
| Sheet A | 1 | 2 | 3 | 4 | 5 | 6 | 7 | 8 | 9 | 10 | Final |
|---|---|---|---|---|---|---|---|---|---|---|---|
| Yukon (Shaw) | 0 | 0 | 0 | 1 | 0 | 1 | 0 | 1 | 0 | X | 3 |
| British Columbia (Recksiedler) | 0 | 0 | 1 | 0 | 3 | 0 | 3 | 0 | 4 | X | 11 |

| Sheet D | 1 | 2 | 3 | 4 | 5 | 6 | 7 | 8 | 9 | 10 | Final |
|---|---|---|---|---|---|---|---|---|---|---|---|
| Newfoundland and Labrador (Devereaux) | 2 | 1 | 1 | 1 | 3 | 2 | X | X | X | X | 10 |
| Prince Edward Island (Hughes) | 0 | 0 | 0 | 0 | 0 | 0 | X | X | X | X | 0 |

| Sheet E | 1 | 2 | 3 | 4 | 5 | 6 | 7 | 8 | 9 | 10 | Final |
|---|---|---|---|---|---|---|---|---|---|---|---|
| Northwest Territories (Thompson) | 1 | 0 | 2 | 0 | 1 | 1 | 0 | 1 | 0 | X | 6 |
| Northern Ontario (Ketonen) | 0 | 0 | 0 | 0 | 0 | 0 | 2 | 0 | 1 | X | 3 |

| Sheet H | 1 | 2 | 3 | 4 | 5 | 6 | 7 | 8 | 9 | 10 | Final |
|---|---|---|---|---|---|---|---|---|---|---|---|
| Saskatchewan (Surik) | 0 | 1 | 0 | 1 | 0 | 2 | 0 | 1 | 0 | 1 | 6 |
| Ontario (Cochrane) | 0 | 0 | 1 | 0 | 1 | 0 | 2 | 0 | 1 | 0 | 5 |

| Sheet J | 1 | 2 | 3 | 4 | 5 | 6 | 7 | 8 | 9 | 10 | Final |
|---|---|---|---|---|---|---|---|---|---|---|---|
| Manitoba (Hunter) | 1 | 1 | 0 | 1 | 0 | 1 | 0 | 0 | 2 | 0 | 6 |
| New Brunswick (Kelly) | 0 | 0 | 2 | 0 | 1 | 0 | 2 | 2 | 0 | 0 | 7 |

| Sheet L | 1 | 2 | 3 | 4 | 5 | 6 | 7 | 8 | 9 | 10 | 11 | Final |
|---|---|---|---|---|---|---|---|---|---|---|---|---|
| Quebec (Cantin) | 1 | 0 | 2 | 0 | 0 | 0 | 1 | 0 | 0 | 2 | 0 | 6 |
| Alberta (Kirk) | 0 | 1 | 0 | 0 | 3 | 1 | 0 | 1 | 0 | 0 | 1 | 7 |

==== Draw 13 ====
| Sheet A | 1 | 2 | 3 | 4 | 5 | 6 | 7 | 8 | 9 | 10 | Final |
|---|---|---|---|---|---|---|---|---|---|---|---|
| Alberta (Kirk) | 1 | 0 | 1 | 0 | 1 | 0 | 0 | 0 | 1 | 0 | 4 |
| New Brunswick (Kelly) | 0 | 1 | 0 | 0 | 0 | 0 | 1 | 1 | 0 | 2 | 5 |

| Sheet D | 1 | 2 | 3 | 4 | 5 | 6 | 7 | 8 | 9 | 10 | Final |
|---|---|---|---|---|---|---|---|---|---|---|---|
| Quebec (Cantin) | 1 | 0 | 1 | 0 | 1 | 0 | 1 | 0 | 1 | X | 5 |
| Nova Scotia (Mouzar) | 0 | 1 | 0 | 3 | 0 | 1 | 0 | 3 | 0 | X | 8 |

| Sheet E | 1 | 2 | 3 | 4 | 5 | 6 | 7 | 8 | 9 | 10 | 11 | Final |
|---|---|---|---|---|---|---|---|---|---|---|---|---|
| Manitoba (Hunter) | 0 | 5 | 0 | 2 | 0 | 0 | 0 | 1 | 0 | 1 | 1 | 10 |
| Ontario (Cochrane) | 0 | 0 | 2 | 0 | 2 | 3 | 1 | 0 | 1 | 0 | 0 | 9 |

| Sheet G | 1 | 2 | 3 | 4 | 5 | 6 | 7 | 8 | 9 | 10 | Final |
|---|---|---|---|---|---|---|---|---|---|---|---|
| British Columbia (Recksiedler) | 1 | 0 | 0 | 0 | 2 | 1 | 0 | 1 | 0 | X | 5 |
| Newfoundland and Labrador (Devereaux) | 0 | 1 | 1 | 2 | 0 | 0 | 1 | 0 | 2 | X | 7 |

| Sheet J | 1 | 2 | 3 | 4 | 5 | 6 | 7 | 8 | 9 | 10 | Final |
|---|---|---|---|---|---|---|---|---|---|---|---|
| Prince Edward Island (Hughes) | 0 | 0 | 2 | 0 | 1 | 0 | 1 | 0 | 1 | X | 5 |
| Saskatchewan (Surik) | 1 | 1 | 0 | 2 | 0 | 2 | 0 | 1 | 0 | X | 7 |

| Sheet K | 1 | 2 | 3 | 4 | 5 | 6 | 7 | 8 | 9 | 10 | Final |
|---|---|---|---|---|---|---|---|---|---|---|---|
| Northern Ontario (Ketonen) | 0 | 1 | 0 | 0 | 0 | 1 | 0 | 1 | 1 | X | 4 |
| Yukon (Shaw) | 2 | 0 | 0 | 1 | 2 | 0 | 2 | 0 | 0 | X | 7 |

=== Playoffs ===
| Semifinal | | Final |
| Quebec | 6 |
| New Brunswick | 5 | Nova Scotia | 6 |
| | | Quebec | 3 |

==== Semifinal ====
| Sheet I | 1 | 2 | 3 | 4 | 5 | 6 | 7 | 8 | 9 | 10 | Final |
|---|---|---|---|---|---|---|---|---|---|---|---|
| New Brunswick (Kelly) | 0 | 0 | 1 | 1 | 1 | 0 | 1 | 0 | 1 | 0 | 5 |
| Quebec (Cantin) | 0 | 1 | 0 | 0 | 0 | 1 | 0 | 2 | 0 | 2 | 6 |

Player percentages
| New Brunswick | | Quebec | |
|---|---|---|---|
| Lianne Sobey | 88% | Julie Cantin | 85% |
| Jodie deSolla | 66% | Amelie Blais | 57% |
| Kristen Mac Diarmid | 78% | Anne-Marie Filteau | 86% |
| Andrea Kelly | 76% | Marie Cantin | 65% |
| Total | 77% | Total | 73% |

==== Final ====
| Sheet D | 1 | 2 | 3 | 4 | 5 | 6 | 7 | 8 | 9 | 10 | Final |
|---|---|---|---|---|---|---|---|---|---|---|---|
| Quebec (Cantin) | 0 | 0 | 1 | 1 | 1 | 0 | 0 | 0 | 0 | X | 3 |
| Nova Scotia (Mouzar) | 1 | 0 | 0 | 0 | 0 | 1 | 1 | 1 | 2 | X | 6 |

Player percentages
| Quebec | | Nova Scotia | |
|---|---|---|---|
| Julie Cantin | 79% | Chloe Comstock | 66% |
| Amelie Blais | 71% | Blisse Comstock | 69% |
| Anne-Marie Filteau | 76% | Paige Mattie | 68% |
| Marie Cantin | 69% | Jill Mouzar | 69% |
| Total | 74% | Total | 68% |

== Qualification ==
=== Ontario ===
The Teranet Ontario Junior Curling Championships were held January 7–11 at the Oakville Curling Club in Oakville.

Kelly Cochrane defeated Lee Merklinger from the Granite Curling Club of West Ottawa in the women's final. Merklinger had beaten the Julie Reddick rink from Oakville 3-1 in the semifinal.

In the men's final, John Epping of Peterborough defeated Mark Bice of Sarnia 8-5. Epping had beaten the Ottawa Curling Club's Mike McLean rink 7-5 in the semifinal
