= PEI Women's Curling Championship =

- Established: 1951
- 2026 host city: Montague, Prince Edward Island
- 2026 arena: Montague Curling Club
- 2026 champion: Amanda Power

Current edition
- 2026 PEI Women's Curling Championship

The PEI Women's Curling Championship, formerly the Prince Edward Island Scotties Tournament of Hearts is the provincial women's curling championship in the Canadian province of Prince Edward Island. The tournament is run by Curl PEI, the provincial curling association. The winning team represents Prince Edward Island at the Scotties Tournament of Hearts.

== Past winners ==
Year	Skip	Curling club
2026	Amanda Power, Veronica Mayne, Emily Best, Sabrina Smith	Summerside CC
2025	Veronica Mayne (Fourth), Jane DiCarlo (Skip), Sabrina Smith, Whitney Jenkins	Crapaud Community CC
2024	Veronica Mayne (Fourth), Jane DiCarlo (Skip), Sabrina Smith, Whitney Jenkins	Crapaud Community CC
2023	Suzanne Birt (Fourth), Marie Christianson (Skip), Michelle Shea, Meaghan Hughes	Cornwall Curling Club
2022	Cancelled due to the COVID-19 pandemic in Prince Edward Island. Team Birt (Suzanne Birt, Marie Christianson, Meaghan Hughes, Michelle McQuaid) to represent province at Scotties.	
2021	Suzanne Birt, Kathy O'Rourke, Meaghan Hughes, Michelle McQuaid	Montague Curling Club
2020	Suzanne Birt, Marie Christianson, Meaghan Hughes, Michelle McQuaid	Montague Curling Club
2019	Suzanne Birt, Marie Christianson, Meaghan Hughes, Michelle McQuaid	Charlottetown Curling Complex (Charlottetown)
2018	Robyn MacPhee, Sarah Fullerton, Meaghan Hughes, Michelle McQuaid	Charlottetown Curling Complex
2017	Robyn MacPhee, Sarah Fullerton, Meaghan Hughes, Michelle McQuaid	Charlottetown Curling Complex
2016	Suzanne Birt, Robyn Green, Meaghan Hughes, Marie Christianson	Charlottetown Curling Complex
2015	Suzanne Birt, Shelly Bradley, Michelle McQuaid, Susan McInnis	Charlottetown Curling Complex
2014	Kim Dolan, Rebecca Jean MacDonald, Sinead Dolan, Michala Robison	Charlottetown Curling Complex
2013	Suzanne Birt, Shelly Bradley, Sarah Fullerton, Leslie MacDougall	Charlottetown Curling Complex
2012	Kim Dolan, Rebecca Jean MacDonald, Sinead Dolan, Nancy Cameron, Michala Robison	Charlottetown Curling Club
2011	Suzanne Birt, Shelly Bradley, Robyn MacPhee, Leslie MacDougall	Charlottetown Curling Club
2010	Erin Carmody, Geri-Lynn Ramsay, Kathy O'Rourke (skip), Tricia Affleck	Charlottetown Curling Club
2009	Robyn MacPhee, Rebecca Jean MacPhee, Shelley Muzika, Tammi Lowther	Charlottetown Curling Club
2008	Suzanne Gaudet, Robyn MacPhee, Carol Webb, Stefanie Clark	Charlottetown Curling Club
2007	Suzanne Gaudet, Robyn MacPhee, Carol Webb, Stefanie Clark	Charlottetown Curling Club
2006	Suzanne Gaudet, Susan McInnis, Nancy Cameron, Tricia Affleck	Charlottetown Curling Club
2005	Rebecca Jean MacPhee, Shelly Bradley, Robyn MacPhee, Stefanie Richard	Charlottetown Curling Club
2004	Suzanne Gaudet, Susan McInnis, Janice MacCallum, Tricia Affleck	Charlottetown Curling Club
2003	Suzanne Gaudet, Rebecca Jean MacPhee, Robyn MacPhee, Susan McInnis	Charlottetown Curling Club
2002	Kathy O'Rourke, Julie Scales, Lori Robinson, Bea Graham	Charlottetown Curling Club
2001	Shelly Bradley, Janice MacCallum, Leslie Allan, Tricia MacGregor	Charlottetown Curling Club
2000	Shelly Bradley, Janice MacCallum, Leslie Allan, Tricia MacGregor	Charlottetown Curling Club
1999	Rebecca Jean MacPhee, Kim Dolan, Kathy O'Rourke, Lou Ann Henry	Charlottetown Curling Club
1998	Tammi Lowther, Susan McInnis, Shelley Muzika, Julie Scales	Charlottetown Curling Club
1997	Rebecca Jean MacPhee, Kim Dolan, Marion MacAulay, Lou Ann Henry	Charlottetown Curling Club
1996	Susan McInnis, Kathy O'Rourke, Tricia MacGregor, Leslie Allan	Charlottetown Curling Club
1995	Rebecca Jean MacPhee, Kim Dolan, Marion MacAulay, Lou Ann Henry	Charlottetown Curling Club
1994	Shelly Danks, Nancy Reid, Janice MacCallum, Shelley Muzika	Charlottetown Curling Club
1993	Angela Roberts, Sara Gatchell, Janice MacCallum, Nancy Reid	Silver Fox Curling Club (Summerside)
1992	Kim Dolan, Susan McInnis, Julie Scales, Marion MacAulay	Charlottetown Curling Club
1991	Angela Roberts, Kathy O'Rourke, Susan McCurdy, Beatrice Graham-MacDonald	Charlottetown Curling Club
1990	Kim Dolan, Karen Jones, Shelley Muzika, Janice MacCallum	Charlottetown Curling Club
1989	Kathie Gallant, Susan McInnis, Beatrice Graham-MacDonald, Kathy O'Rourke	Charlottetown Curling Club
1988	Jennifer Ramsay, Terry Nicholson, June Moyaert, Frances McGowan	Montague R.A. Complex (Montague)
1987	Kim Dolan, Karen Jones, Shelley Muzika, Nancy Reid	Charlottetown Curling Club
1986	Barbara Currie, Beverley Millar, Ann Currie, Marlene Noye	Silver Fox Curling Club
1985	Kim Dolan, Cathy Dillon, Kathie Gallant, Karen MacDonald	Charlottetown Curling Club
1984	Barbara Currie, Beverley Millar, Ann Currie, Marlene Noye	Silver Fox Curling Club
1983	Kim McLeod, Cathy Dillon, Karen MacDonald, Kathie Burke	Charlottetown Curling Club
1982	Gloria Large, Wanda Aulenback, Diane Bradley, Irene MacDonald	Charlottetown Curling Club
1981	Beverly Millar, Elizabeth Miles, Norma Worth, Wanda MacLean	Silver Fox Curling Club
1980	Elayne Thomson, Ruth Cutcliffe, Louise Thompson, Julia Robinson	Crapaud Community Curling Club (Crapaud)
1979	Elayne Thomson, Ruth Cutcliffe, Louise Thompson, Julia Robinson	Crapaud Community Curling Club
1978	Gloria Basha, Marilyn Sutherland, Wilma McLure, Marion Basha	Charlottetown Curling Club
1977	Phyllis Drysdale, Esther Cox, Shirley Veinot, Ethel Hovey	Belvedere Golf & Winter Club (Charlottetown)
1976	Diane Blanchard, Barbara McCurdy, Deborah Richard, Sharon MacEwen	Charlottetown Curling Club
1975	Diane Blanchard, Barbara McCurdy, Jean Court, Sharon MacEwen	Charlottetown Curling Club
1974	Marie Toole, Cathy Dillon, Jennie Boomhower, Pauline Johnston	Charlottetown Curling Club
1973	Elayne Thomson, Ruth Cutcliffe, Louise Thompson, Frances Roberts	Charlottetown Curling Club
1972	Marie Toole, Jennie Boomhower, Cathy Dillon, Pauline Johnston	Charlottetown Curling Club
1971	Marie Toole, Jennie Boomhower, Cathy Dillon, Pauline Johnston	Charlottetown Curling Club
1970	Marie Toole, Jennie Boomhower, Cathy Dillon, Pauline Johnston	Charlottetown Curling Club
1969	Marie Toole, Jennie Boomhower, Mary Acorn, Pauline Johnston	Charlottetown Curling Club
1968	Gladys Carruthers, Anita Cudmore, Wanda Robinson, Audrey MacKinnon	Charlottetown Curling Club
1967	Elizabeth MacDonald, Marie Toole, Barbara Squarebriggs, Peggy Dalziel	Charlottetown Curling Club
1966	Kay Hoare, Lila Tucker, Diane Stark, Muriel Thomas	RCAF Summerside Curling Club
1965	Sybil MacMillan, Marjorie Stewart, Jennie Boomhower, Janet Douglas	Charlottetown Curling Club
1964	Mary Nicholson, Edith Clay, Connie Ings, Evelyn Cudmore	Montague Curling Club
1963	Fern Seel, Bernice Cook, Kay Hoare, Elsie Farquhar	RCAF Summerside Curling Club
1962	Elizabeth MacDonald, Sally Rodd, Evelyn Goss, Nora McDonald	Charlottetown Curling Club
1961	Elizabeth MacDonald, Sally Rodd, Evelyn Goss, Nora McDonald	Charlottetown Curling Club
1960	Pauline Burden, Gladys Carruthers, Frances Whitlock, Shirley Carr	
1959	Mary MacLennan, Louise Bell, Marion MacDonald, Bea Humphrey	
1958	Sybil MacMillan, Marion Dockendorff, Jennie Boomhower, Iris MacLennan	
1957	Mary Nicholson, Hal Inman, Edith Clay, Anna Pettitt	
1956	Sybil MacMillan, Marion Dockendorff, Iris MacLellan, Mary Tait	
1955	Kay Johnson, Pauline Burden, Rosemary Hill, Nora MacDonald	
1954	Betty Linkletter, Irene Silliphant, Sally Basler, Frances Henthorn	
1953	Betty Linkletter, Irene Silliphant, Sally Basler, Frances Henthorn	
1952	Betty Linkletter, Irene Silliphant, Sally Basler, Frances Henthorn	
1951	Anna Hayes, Marion Smallman, Verda Holman, Shirley Simpson	
