= 2002 Prince Edward Island Scott Tournament of Hearts =

The 2002 Prince Edward Island Scott Tournament of Hearts was held February 1–5 at the Silver Fox Curling Club in Summerside, Prince Edward Island. The winning team was Team Kathy O'Rourke who represented Prince Edward Island, finished with a 3-8 round-robin record at the 2002 Scott Tournament of Hearts in Brandon, Manitoba.

== Teams ==
Skip	Third	Second	Lead	Club
Shelly Bradley	Janice MacCallum	Leslie MacDougall	Tricia MacGregor	Charlottetown Curling Club, Charlottetown
Tammy Dewar	Rosemary Crane	Gail Greene	Susan Watts	Montague Curling Club, Montague, Prince Edward Island
Jennifer Dixon	Terri Thompson	June Moyaert	Linda Scott	Montague Curling Club, Montague, Prince Edward Island
Kathie Gallant	Stefanie Richard	Marion MacAulay	Shelley Muzika	Charlottetown Curling Club, Charlottetown
Angela Hodgson	Krista Helmka	Jacelyn Reid	April Ennis	Charlottetown Curling Club, Charlottetown
Donna Lank	Marie Molyneaux	Nancy Yeo	Carolyne Coulson	Cornwall Curling Club, Cornwall
Faith LeClair	Flo Birch	Kathy Reeves	Kim Glydon	Silver Fox Curling Club, Summerside, Prince Edward Island
Tammi Lowther	Anne Dillon	Lisa MacRae	Kate Robertson	Charlottetown Curling Club, Charlottetown
Karen A. Macdonald	Kim Aylward	Brenda MacLean	Karen E. Macdonald	Silver Fox Curling Club, Summerside
Rebecca Jean MacPhee	Susan McInnis	Kim Dolan	Nancy Cameron	Charlottetown Curling Club, Charlottetown
Kathy O'Rourke	Julie Scales	Lori Robinson	Bea Graham	Charlottetown Curling Club, Charlottetown
Lana Simmons	Jeannette Rivard	Kathy Simmons	Wendy Mitchell	Silver Fox Curling Club, Summerside

=== Draw 1 ===
February 1, 10:00 AM AT

Sheet A	1	2	3	4	5	6	7	8	9	10	Final
Gallant	3	0	2	1	0	0	0	0	1	X	7
Dewar	0	1	0	0	0	1	1	2	0	X	5

Sheet B	1	2	3	4	5	6	7	8	9	10	Final
Dixon	0	1	0	2	0	1	0	1	0	X	5
Lowther	2	0	0	0	4	0	1	0	2	X	9

Sheet C	1	2	3	4	5	6	7	8	9	10	Final
MacDonald	0	1	1	0	0	3	0	1	0	1	7
Bradley	1	0	0	2	0	0	2	0	0	0	5

Sheet D	1	2	3	4	5	6	7	8	9	10	Final
MacPhee	1	1	0	2	0	1	0	0	2	X	7
Simmons	0	0	1	0	1	0	1	0	0	X	3

=== Draw 2 ===
February 1, 3:00 PM AT

Sheet A	1	2	3	4	5	6	7	8	9	10	Final
Hodgson	0	2	0	1	0	1	0	0	1	X	5
Lank	3	0	1	0	1	0	1	1	0	X	7

Sheet B	1	2	3	4	5	6	7	8	9	10	Final
LeClair	0	0	0	0	2	0	0	X	X	X	2
O'Rourke	3	2	2	0	0	2	1	X	X	X	10

Sheet C	1	2	3	4	5	6	7	8	9	10	Final
Gallant	0	1	1	0	2	1	2	3	X	X	10
Lowther	2	0	0	1	0	0	0	0	X	X	3

Sheet D	1	2	3	4	5	6	7	8	9	10	Final
MacDonald	0	0	2	0	0	1	0	1	0	X	4
MacPhee	0	3	0	2	2	0	1	0	1	X	9

Sheet E	1	2	3	4	5	6	7	8	9	10	Final
Dixon	0	3	2	2	2	3	X	X	X	X	12
Dewar	1	0	0	0	0	0	X	X	X	X	1

Sheet F	1	2	3	4	5	6	7	8	9	10	Final
Bradley	1	1	1	1	0	4	2	1	X	X	11
Simmons	0	0	0	0	1	0	0	0	X	X	1

=== Draw 3 ===
February 2, 9:00 AM AT

Sheet A	1	2	3	4	5	6	7	8	9	10	Final
LeClair	1	0	1	0	1	1	0	X	X	X	4
MacDonald	0	4	0	4	0	0	2	X	X	X	10

Sheet B	1	2	3	4	5	6	7	8	9	10	Final
Hodgson	0	0	0	0	X	X	X	X	X	X	0
Lowther	5	4	3	2	X	X	X	X	X	X	14

=== Draw 4 ===
February 2, 2:00 PM AT

Sheet A	1	2	3	4	5	6	7	8	9	10	Final
Gallant	0	1	0	2	0	3	3	0	1	X	10
Lank	1	0	2	0	1	0	0	1	0	X	5

Sheet B	1	2	3	4	5	6	7	8	9	10	Final
O'Rourke	2	0	0	1	0	0	3	0	3	X	9
MacPhee	0	1	2	0	0	1	0	1	0	X	5

Sheet C	1	2	3	4	5	6	7	8	9	10	11	Final
MacDonald	0	1	0	0	0	0	2	0	0	1	0	4
Dixon	1	0	0	0	0	2	0	0	1	0	1	5

Sheet D	1	2	3	4	5	6	7	8	9	10	Final
Lowther	0	1	2	0	0	1	0	1	0	0	5
Bradley	0	0	0	3	1	0	1	0	0	3	8

Sheet E	1	2	3	4	5	6	7	8	9	10	Final
LeClair	0	0	0	1	2	0	0	3	0	0	6
Dewar	2	1	1	0	0	2	1	0	1	1	9

Sheet F	1	2	3	4	5	6	7	8	9	10	Final
Hodgson	0	0	0	0	2	0	2	0	0	X	4
Simmons	2	0	1	0	0	1	0	3	0	X	7

=== A Side Final ===
February 2, 7:00 PM AT

Sheet A	1	2	3	4	5	6	7	8	9	10	11	Final
O'Rourke	0	4	0	0	0	1	0	1	0	0	0	6
Gallant	1	0	0	1	1	0	1	0	2	0	2	8

=== Draw 5 ===
February, AT

Sheet E	1	2	3	4	5	6	7	8	9	10	Final
Dixon	1	0	0	2	2	0	3	1	0	1	10
Lank	0	1	1	0	0	3	0	0	2	0	7

Sheet B	1	2	3	4	5	6	7	8	9	10	Final
Bradley	0	0	1	0	0	0	1	0	0	X	2
MacPhee	1	1	0	0	0	0	0	2	2	X	6

Sheet C	1	2	3	4	5	6	7	8	9	10	Final
Lowther	1	0	5	0	1	0	1	0	X	X	8
Dewar	0	0	0	1	0	1	0	1	X	X	3

Sheet D	1	2	3	4	5	6	7	8	9	10	11	Final
Simmons	0	0	0	0	1	1	0	3	0	0	0	5
MacDonald	0	0	1	1	0	0	2	0	0	1	1	6

=== Draw 6 ===
February 3, 2:00 PM AT

Sheet A	1	2	3	4	5	6	7	8	9	10	11	Final
Dixon	1	1	2	0	0	1	0	1	1	0	1	8
O'Rourke	0	0	0	3	1	0	2	0	0	1	0	7

Sheet B	1	2	3	4	5	6	7	8	9	10	11	Final
MacPhee	0	0	1	0	1	0	1	1	0	1	0	5
Gallant	1	0	0	1	0	1	0	0	2	0	1	6

Sheet C	1	2	3	4	5	6	7	8	9	10	Final
Lowther	1	0	1	0	0	3	0	0	0	X	5
Lank	0	2	0	1	2	0	0	3	3	X	11

Sheet D	1	2	3	4	5	6	7	8	9	10	Final
MacDonald	0	0	0	0	X	X	X	X	X	X	0
Bradley	1	2	3	4	X	X	X	X	X	X	10

=== B Side Final ===
February 3, 7:00 PM AT

Sheet C	1	2	3	4	5	6	7	8	9	10	Final
Gallant	2	0	2	1	0	4	X	X	X	X	9
Dixon	0	1	0	0	1	0	X	X	X	X	2

=== Draw 7 ===
February 3, 7:00 PM AT

Sheet A	1	2	3	4	5	6	7	8	9	10	Final
MacPhee	0	0	2	0	1	0	0	3	0	1	7
Lank	1	0	0	1	0	2	0	0	2	0	6

Sheet B	1	2	3	4	5	6	7	8	9	10	Final
O'Rourke	1	0	0	3	0	1	1	0	1	2	9
Bradley	0	0	2	0	2	0	0	2	0	0	6

=== Draw 8 ===
February 4, 2:00 PM AT

Sheet A	1	2	3	4	5	6	7	8	9	10	Final
Dixon	0	1	0	0	1	0	0	0	X	X	2
MacPhee	1	0	2	2	0	2	1	1	X	X	9

Sheet B	1	2	3	4	5	6	7	8	9	10	Final
O'Rourke	2	1	0	0	0	2	0	1	0	X	6
Gallant	0	0	1	1	1	0	1	0	1	X	5

=== C Side Final ===
February 4, 7:00 PM AT

Sheet A	1	2	3	4	5	6	7	8	9	10	Final
O'Rourke	0	3	0	1	0	2	0	2	0	X	8
MacPhee	0	0	1	0	1	0	1	0	2	X	5

== Playoffs ==
Semifinal		Final
		Kathie Gallant	6
Kathie Gallant	4	Kathy O'Rourke	7
Kathy O'Rourke	8

=== Semi-final ===
February 5, 11:00 AM AT

Sheet A	1	2	3	4	5	6	7	8	9	10	Final
Gallant	0	0	0	1	1	1	0	0	1	0	4
O'Rourke	0	1	0	0	0	2	2	2	0	1	8

=== Final ===
February 5, 4:00 PM AT

Sheet A	1	2	3	4	5	6	7	8	9	10	Final
Gallant	0	0	2	0	0	0	2	0	2	0	6
O'Rourke	0	1	0	0	1	2	0	1	0	2	7
