= 2007 Prince Edward Island Scotties Tournament of Hearts =

The 2007 Prince Edward Island Scotties Tournament of Hearts was held Jan. 18–22 in at the Western Community Curling Club in Alberton, Prince Edward Island. The winning team was Team Suzanne Gaudet who represented Prince Edward Island, finished with a 6-5 round-robin record and a 4th-place finish in the page playoff at the 2007 Scotties Tournament of Hearts in Lethbridge, Alberta.

== Teams ==
Skip	Third	Second	Lead	Club
Bev Beaton	Jean Sinclair	Kiri Campbell	Julia Kilbride	Cornwall Curling Club, Charlottetown Curling Club, Charlottetown
Shelly Bradley	Janice MacCallum	Tammi Lowther	Tricia Affleck	Charlottetown Curling Club, Charlottetown
Donna Butler	Marie Molyneaux	Melissa Andrews	Leita Chisholm	Cornwall Curling Club, Cornwall
Krista Cameron	Angela Hynes	Nancy Sinclair	Bethany Smith	Silver Fox Curling Club, Summerside, Prince Edward Island
Karen Currie	Valerie Acorn	Terri Wood	Cyndie Cunneyworth	Cornwall Curling Club, Cornwall
Suzanne Gaudet	Robyn MacPhee	Carol Webb	Stefanie Clark	Charlottetown Curling Club, Charlottetown
Meaghan Hughes	Sinead Dolan	Michala Robison	Kim Dolan	Charlottetown Curling Club, Charlottetown
Rebecca Jean MacPhee	Kathy O'Rourke	Leslie MacDougall	Connie Simmons Shaw	Charlottetown Curling Club, Charlottetown
Lori Robinson	Lisa Jackson	Jackie Reid	Carolyn Coulson	Charlottetown Curling Club, Charlottetown

=== Draw 1 ===
January 18, 2:00 PM AT

Sheet A	1	2	3	4	5	6	7	8	9	10	Final
Robinson	0	1	0	1	1	0	2	0	2	X	7
Butler	1	0	1	0	0	1	0	1	0	X	4

Sheet B	1	2	3	4	5	6	7	8	9	10	Final
Beaton	0	1	0	0	0	0	X	X	X	X	1
MacPhee	0	0	2	1	2	4	X	X	X	X	9

Sheet C	1	2	3	4	5	6	7	8	9	10	Final
Bradley	2	1	0	1	0	0	1	2	0	X	7
Currie	0	0	2	0	1	1	0	0	0	X	4

Sheet D	1	2	3	4	5	6	7	8	9	10	Final
Cameron	1	0	0	0	0	1	0	1	X	X	3
Hughes	0	2	0	2	1	0	3	0	X	X	8

=== Draw 2 ===
January 18, 8:00 PM AT

Sheet A	1	2	3	4	5	6	7	8	9	10	Final
Currie	2	1	0	1	0	1	0	0	1	1	7
Cameron	0	0	2	0	3	0	1	2	0	0	8

Sheet B	1	2	3	4	5	6	7	8	9	10	Final
Bradley	0	0	1	3	0	2	1	0	1	0	8
Hughes	2	3	0	0	1	0	0	1	0	2	9

Sheet C	1	2	3	4	5	6	7	8	9	10	Final
Robinson	0	2	0	0	0	0	2	0	2	0	6
Gaudet	2	0	0	0	1	1	0	1	0	2	7

Sheet D	1	2	3	4	5	6	7	8	9	10	Final
Beaton	0	0	0	0	1	X	X	X	X	X	1
Butler	2	1	4	3	0	X	X	X	X	X	10

=== Draw 3 ===
January 19, 2:00 PM AT

Sheet A	1	2	3	4	5	6	7	8	9	10	Final
Bradley	0	0	2	0	2	1	0	3	X	X	8
Butler	0	0	0	1	0	0	1	0	X	X	2

Sheet B	1	2	3	4	5	6	7	8	9	10	Final
Gaudet	0	3	0	1	1	1	2	X	X	X	8
MacPhee	1	0	1	0	0	0	0	X	X	X	2

Sheet C	1	2	3	4	5	6	7	8	9	10	11	Final
Currie	0	0	3	1	0	1	1	1	0	0	1	8
Beaton	0	3	0	0	1	0	0	0	2	1	0	7

Sheet D	1	2	3	4	5	6	7	8	9	10	11	Final
Cameron	1	0	1	0	0	2	1	0	0	1	0	6
Robinson	0	0	0	2	1	0	0	1	2	0	1	7

=== A Side Final ===
January 19, 7:00 PM AT

Sheet A	1	2	3	4	5	6	7	8	9	10	Final
Hughes	0	0	2	0	1	0	0	0	X	X	3
Gaudet	1	0	0	2	0	2	1	2	X	X	8

=== Draw 4 ===
January 19, 7:00 PM AT

Sheet B	1	2	3	4	5	6	7	8	9	10	Final
Currie	0	2	2	0	2	2	X	X	X	X	8
Cameron	1	0	0	1	0	0	X	X	X	X	2

Sheet C	1	2	3	4	5	6	7	8	9	10	Final
Robinson	0	1	0	1	0	1	0	2	0	X	5
MacPhee	1	0	2	0	2	0	2	0	5	X	12

=== Draw 5 ===
January 20, 2:00 PM AT

Sheet A	1	2	3	4	5	6	7	8	9	10	Final
MacPhee	0	1	0	1	0	2	0	0	0	X	4
Hughes	1	0	2	0	1	0	1	1	1	X	7

Sheet B	1	2	3	4	5	6	7	8	9	10	Final
Bradley	0	2	0	0	1	0	2	0	1	0	6
Gaudet	1	0	1	0	0	2	0	3	0	1	8

Sheet C	1	2	3	4	5	6	7	8	9	10	Final
Butler	2	0	1	0	0	0	0	2	0	X	5
Robinson	0	2	0	2	0	2	3	0	2	X	11

=== B Side Final ===
January 20, 7:00 PM AT

Sheet C	1	2	3	4	5	6	7	8	9	10	Final
Hughes	0	0	1	0	0	0	1	0	0	X	2
Gaudet	0	3	0	2	0	2	0	0	1	X	8

=== Draw 6 ===
January 20, 7:00 PM AT

Sheet A	1	2	3	4	5	6	7	8	9	10	Final
Currie	0	1	0	1	0	3	0	0	X	X	5
Bradley	3	0	3	0	1	0	2	2	X	X	11

Sheet B	1	2	3	4	5	6	7	8	9	10	Final
Robinson	0	3	0	2	1	1	0	2	X	X	9
MacPhee	0	0	1	0	0	0	1	0	X	X	2

=== Draw 7 ===
January 21, 2:00 PM AT

Sheet A	1	2	3	4	5	6	7	8	9	10	Final
Gaudet	0	1	1	0	0	2	2	0	1	X	7
Robinson	1	0	0	1	0	0	0	1	0	X	3

Sheet B	1	2	3	4	5	6	7	8	9	10	Final
Hughes	0	2	0	0	2	0	0	1	0	1	6
Bradley	1	0	1	0	0	1	1	0	1	0	5

=== C Side Final ===
January 21, 7:00 PM AT

Sheet B	1	2	3	4	5	6	7	8	9	10	Final
Gaudet	0	1	0	1	0	0	1	0	0	1	4
Hughes	0	0	1	0	1	0	0	1	0	0	3

=== Final ===
January 22, 2:00 PM AT Not Needed

Sheet A	1	2	3	4	5	6	7	8	9	10	Final
Gaudet	0	0	0	0	0	0	0	0	0	0	0
Gaudet	0	0	0	0	0	0	0	0	0	0	0

- Team Gaudet won A, B and C finals therefore a championship final was not needed.
