= 2001 Prince Edward Island Scott Tournament of Hearts =

The 2001 Prince Edward Island Scott Tournament of Hearts was held January 19–23 at the Charlottetown Curling Club in Charlottetown, Prince Edward Island. The winning team was Team Shelly Bradley who represented Prince Edward Island, finished with a 7-4 round-robin record, losing the tiebreaker for a place in the semi-finals at the 2001 Scott Tournament of Hearts in Sudbury, Ontario.

== Teams ==
Skip	Third	Second	Lead	Club
Shelly Bradley	Janice MacCallum	Leslie MacDougall	Tricia MacGregor	Charlottetown Curling Club, Charlottetown
Tammy Dewar	Darlene Clow	Gail Greene	Susan Watts	Montague Curling Club, Montague, Prince Edward Island
Jennifer Dixon	Terri Nicholson	June Moyaert	Linda Scott	Montague Curling Club, Montague, Prince Edward Island
Kathie Gallant	Krista Cameron	Shelley Muzika	Marion MacAulay	Charlottetown Curling Club, Charlottetown
Donna Lank	Josie Herring	Nancy Yeo	Judy Connell	Cornwall Curling Club, Cornwall
Tammi Lowther	Anne Dillon	Lisa MacRae	Kate Robertson	Charlottetown Curling Club, Charlottetown
Karen A. Macdonald	Karen E. Macdonald	Brenda MacLean	Kim Aylward	Silver Fox Curling Club, Summerside
Rebecca Jean MacPhee	Kim Dolan	Susan McInnis	Nancy Cameron	Charlottetown Curling Club, Charlottetown
Marie Molyneaux	Shirley Berry	Kim Glydon	Sherren Morrison	Cornwall Curling Club, Cornwall, Prince Edward Island
Kathy O'Rourke	Julie Scales	Gail MacNeil	Bea Graham	Charlottetown Curling Club, Charlottetown

=== Draw 1 ===
January 19, 3:00 PM AT

Sheet A	1	2	3	4	5	6	7	8	9	10	Final
Molyneaux	0	0	1	0	1	1	0	1	X	X	4
Bradley	2	0	0	3	0	0	5	0	X	X	10

Sheet B	1	2	3	4	5	6	7	8	9	10	Final
Lowther	0	2	0	0	0	0	0	3	0	X	5
Dixon	0	0	2	0	1	1	3	0	2	X	9

Sheet C	1	2	3	4	5	6	7	8	9	10	Final
O'Rourke	0	0	0	1	0	1	1	1	1	0	5
MacPhee	1	1	0	0	2	0	0	0	0	2	6

Sheet D	1	2	3	4	5	6	7	8	9	10	Final
Gallant	0	0	1	0	4	2	3	0	1	X	11
Lank	0	2	0	1	0	0	0	2	0	X	5

=== Draw 2 ===
January 19, 8:00 PM AT

Sheet A	1	2	3	4	5	6	7	8	9	10	Final
Dewar	0	0	0	1	1	0	2	0	X	X	4
MacDonald	3	2	2	0	0	1	0	3	X	X	11

Sheet B	1	2	3	4	5	6	7	8	9	10	Final
O'Rourke	1	0	2	1	1	1	0	3	0	X	9
Lank	0	2	0	0	0	0	1	0	2	X	5

Sheet C	1	2	3	4	5	6	7	8	9	10	Final
Dixon	0	1	1	2	0	1	0	0	1	0	6
Bradley	0	0	0	0	3	0	2	1	0	1	7

Sheet D	1	2	3	4	5	6	7	8	9	10	Final
Molyneaux	0	1	0	0	1	0	1	0	X	X	3
Lowther	0	0	2	3	0	1	0	4	X	X	10

=== Draw 3 ===
January 20, 2:00 PM AT

Sheet A	1	2	3	4	5	6	7	8	9	10	Final
Gallant	0	0	0	1	0	0	0	1	0	X	2
MacPhee	1	0	0	0	2	1	1	0	1	X	6

Sheet B	1	2	3	4	5	6	7	8	9	10	Final
O'Rourke	1	1	0	1	0	0	2	1	0	1	7
Lowther	0	0	2	0	1	1	0	0	2	0	6

Sheet C	1	2	3	4	5	6	7	8	9	10	Final
MacDonald	1	0	0	2	0	1	0	0	1	X	5
Bradley	0	2	0	0	2	0	2	1	0	X	6

Sheet D	1	2	3	4	5	6	7	8	9	10	Final
Dewar	0	1	0	1	0	0	0	3	0	X	5
Dixon	2	0	1	0	1	1	2	0	1	X	8

=== A Side Final ===
January 20, 7:00 PM AT

Sheet E	1	2	3	4	5	6	7	8	9	10	Final
Bradley	0	2	0	0	2	0	1	1	0	1	7
MacPhee	0	0	2	1	0	1	0	0	1	0	5

=== Draw 4 ===
January 20, 7:00 PM AT

Sheet A	1	2	3	4	5	6	7	8	9	10	Final
Lank	0	1	0	0	2	0	1	0	1	X	5
Molyneaux	1	0	0	2	0	2	0	2	0	X	7

Sheet B	1	2	3	4	5	6	7	8	9	10	11	Final
MacDonald	1	0	0	3	0	0	1	0	0	1	0	6
Dixon	0	0	1	0	0	2	0	2	1	0	1	7

Sheet C	1	2	3	4	5	6	7	8	9	10	Final
Dewar	0	0	1	0	0	X	X	X	X	X	1
Lowther	3	2	0	2	4	X	X	X	X	X	11

Sheet D	1	2	3	4	5	6	7	8	9	10	Final
O'Rourke	0	2	0	0	0	1	0	0	0	X	3
Gallant	1	0	0	1	1	0	2	1	1	X	7

=== Draw 5 ===
January 21, 2:00 PM AT

Sheet A	1	2	3	4	5	6	7	8	9	10	Final
Gallant	0	0	0	1	2	1	0	0	1	X	6
Bradley	0	0	1	0	0	0	1	0	0	X	2

Sheet B	1	2	3	4	5	6	7	8	9	10	11	Final
O'Rourke	0	0	0	0	2	0	2	0	1	1	1	7
Lowther	0	0	0	3	0	2	0	1	0	0	0	6

Sheet C	1	2	3	4	5	6	7	8	9	10	Final
Dixon	1	1	0	0	1	0	2	0	X	X	5
MacPhee	0	0	2	1	0	5	0	2	X	X	10

Sheet D	1	2	3	4	5	6	7	8	9	10	Final
MacDonald	0	1	0	1	0	2	1	0	1	4	10
Molyneaux	0	0	1	0	2	0	0	3	0	0	6

=== B Side Final ===
January 21, 7:00 PM AT

Sheet A	1	2	3	4	5	6	7	8	9	10	Final
Gallant	1	0	2	3	0	0	1	1	2	X	10
MacPhee	0	1	0	0	2	1	0	0	0	X	4

=== Draw 6 ===
January 21, 7:00 PM AT

Sheet B	1	2	3	4	5	6	7	8	9	10	Final
O'Rourke	0	1	0	0	1	0	3	0	1	1	7
Dixon	1	0	1	1	0	1	0	0	0	0	4

Sheet C	1	2	3	4	5	6	7	8	9	10	Final
Bradley	2	0	3	0	0	4	X	X	X	X	9
MacDonald	0	0	0	1	1	0	X	X	X	X	2

=== Draw 7 ===
January 22, 2:00 PM AT

Sheet A	1	2	3	4	5	6	7	8	9	10	Final
MacPhee	0	0	0	2	0	0	2	0	0	0	4
Bradley	1	0	0	0	1	2	0	3	0	1	8

Sheet B	1	2	3	4	5	6	7	8	9	10	11	Final
Gallant	0	0	2	0	1	0	0	1	1	0	1	6
O'Rourke	1	0	0	2	0	1	0	0	0	1	0	5

=== C Side Final ===
January 22, 7:00 PM AT

Sheet A	1	2	3	4	5	6	7	8	9	10	Final
Gallant	0	0	1	0	2	0	1	0	2	0	6
Bradley	0	3	0	1	0	1	0	1	0	1	7

=== Final ===
January 23, 2:00 PM AT

Sheet A	1	2	3	4	5	6	7	8	9	10	Final
Gallant	0	1	0	0	1	1	2	0	0	X	5
Bradley	0	0	2	5	0	0	0	3	1	X	11
