= Superstore Monctonian Challenge =

Annual curling tournament

Superstore Monctonian Challenge Superstore Lady Monctonian
- Established: 1968
- Host city: Moncton, New Brunswick
- Arena: Curl Moncton
- Men's purse: $12,400
- Women's purse: $6,000

Current champions (2024)
- Men: (New Brunswick) Scott Jones
- Women: (New Brunswick) Sylvie Quillian

The Superstore Monctonian Challenge (men's event) or the Superstore Lady Monctonian (women's event) is an annual bonspiel, or curling tournament, held at Curl Moncton in Moncton, New Brunswick.

The Lady Monctonian Invitational Spiel ran from 1968 to 1987 and, was re-created in 2005 after a hiatus due to a lack of sponsors. It later became a World Curling Tour event until 2019. A men's event was added in 2019.

The tournament is held in a round robin format. The event was previously known as the Lady Monctonian Invitational Spiel, the Lady Monctonian Invitational and the Atlantic Superstore Monctonian Challenge.

== Past Champions ==
=== Women ===
==== 1968–1987 ====
Year	Winning team	Runner-up team
1968	(New Brunswick) Sabina Cadman, Gert Fraser, Fay Jones, Beulah Randall	(Nova Scotia) Terry Ferguson
1969	(New Brunswick) Shirley Pilson, Anne Orser, Pat Maher, Gerry Lenihan	(New Brunswick) Evelyn Affleck, Cully Sinclair, Midge Langley, Marg Rothwell
1970	(New Brunswick) Sabina Cadman, Marie Shearer, Betty Isner, Jean Manning	(New Brunswick) Kay Clarke
1972	(New Brunswick) Polly Thomas, Marge Ellsworth, Willah Wasson, Ann Amero	(New Brunswick) Jo-Anne Thurrott, Janet Strugnell, Sonja Duke, Karen McDermott
1973	(New Brunswick) Peggy Piers, Ruby Steeves, Betty Beaton, Billie Smith	(New Brunswick) Lil MacDonald, Harriet Straton, Terry Mills, Verna Shutt
1974	(Nova Scotia) Gwen Osborne, Liz Young, Barb MacKenzie, Kathy Ingram	(New Brunswick) Joan Freeman
1975	(Nova Scotia) Gwen Osborne, Liz Young, Barb MacKenzie, Kathy Ingram	(New Brunswick) Muriel Harding, Roberta Mott, Mary Cox, Audrey D'Arcy
1976	(Nova Scotia) Ella Ripley, Ginny Chapman, Bev Rayworth, Jackie LeBlanc	(New Brunswick) Barb Boudreau, Hilda Steeves, Kathy Peters, Sally Forster
1977	(Nova Scotia) Gwen Osborne, Liz Young, Louise MacPhee, Eleanor Robinson	(Nova Scotia) Doris Smith
1978	(Nova Scotia) Jean Woolaver, Anne Pink, Joyce Robertson, Carol Cross	(New Brunswick) Jean Roberts, Mary Rouse, Barb Filmore, Lynette Ellseley
1979	(Nova Scotia) Joan Woolaver, Ann Pink, Joyce Robertson, Betty Ann Nicholson	(New Brunswick) Marlene Vaughan, Anne Mosher, Jane Arsenault, Francis Goldsmith
1980	(New Brunswick) Mildred Leger, Jeannine McClenaghan, Marg White, Hubie Pierce	(New Brunswick) Pat Fownes, Marg Evans, Ruth Blacklock, Betty Pepard
1981	(Nova Scotia) Jackie LeBlanc, Cheryl Lusby, Chris Manuge, Annette Bellieveau	(New Brunswick) Mildred Leger, Jeannine McClenaghan, Hubie Pierce, Marg White
1982	(New Brunswick) Mildred Leger, Jeannine MacClenaghan, Hubie Pierce, Marg White	(Nova Scotia) Barbara Mattatall
1983	(New Brunswick) Mildred Leger, Jeannine McClegaghan, Marg White, Francine Pinet	(New Brunswick) Fran Henderson, Gail Nickerson, Lynn Tower, Marg Kennedy
1984	(New Brunswick) Marg Evans, Diane Jameson, Jean Mollins, Marion Ford	(New Brunswick) Janet Strugnell, Barb Baxter, Marion Worth, Pat Dickie
1985	(New Brunswick) Carol Spidell, Rosemary Besse, Linda Sanford, Jenny Purcell	(New Brunswick) Ruth Blacklock, Maureen McMaster, Bernice Duff, Judy Menard
1986	(New Brunswick) Pat Fownes, Glenna Webster, Holly Dobson, Fran Irvine	(New Brunswick) Janet Strugnell, Diane Jamieson, Trudy Roberston, Shirley Crawford
1987	(New Brunswick) Muriel Raymond, Nikki Heffernan, Nora Majeau, Doris Roach	(New Brunswick) Lynda Petrie, Judy Doughan, Mary Hatcher, Sue Valle

==== 2005–present ====
Year	Winning team	Runner-up team	Purse (CAD)
2005	(Nova Scotia) Jocelyn Palmer, Colleen Pinkney, Shelley MacNutt, Susan Lohnes	(Nova Scotia) Brandi Mahaney, Andrea Rushton, Edie Lloyd, Sue McEachern	
2006	(Nova Scotia) Kay Zinck, Colleen Jones, Mary Mattatall, Monica Moriarty	(Nova Scotia) Meaghan Smart, Morgan Muise, Mary Gibson, Jennifer Guzzwell	
2008	(Prince Edward Island) Suzanne Birt, Shelly Bradley, Leslie MacDougall, Stefanie Clark	(New Brunswick) Mary Jane McGuire, Megan McGuire, Sarah Berthelot, Jocelyn Adams	
2009	(Nova Scotia) Colleen Pinkney, Wendy Currie, Karen Hennigar, Susan Creelman	(New Brunswick) Melissa Adams, Sandy Comeau, Stacey Leger, Pamela Nicol	
2010	(New Brunswick) Ashley Howard, Jaclyn Crandall, Shannon Williams, Kristen MacDiarmid	(Prince Edward Island) Erin Carmody, Geri-Lynn Ramsay, Kathy O'Rourke, Tricia Affleck	$12,000
2011	(New Brunswick) Sylvie Robichaud, Danielle Nicholson, Marie Richard, Kendra Dickison	(Prince Edward Island) Suzanne Birt, Shelly Bradley, Robyn MacPhee, Leslie MacDougall	
2012	(New Brunswick) Andrea Crawford, Rebecca Atkinson, Danielle Parsons, Jodie deSolla	(Nova Scotia) Theresa Breen, Amanda Simpson, Jocelyn Adams, Kelly Anderson	$8,000
2013	(Prince Edward Island) Suzanne Birt, Shelly Bradley, Michelle McQuaid, Susan McInnis	(Prince Edward Island) Kathy O'Rourke, Meaghan Hughes, Robyn Green, Tricia Affleck	
2014	(Nova Scotia) Kelly Backman, Kristen MacDiarmid, Jennifer Crouse, Karlee Jones	(Prince Edward Island) Kathy O'Rourke, Robyn Green, Meaghan Hughes, Tricia Affleck	$8,500
2015	(Nova Scotia) Mary Mattatall, Marg Cutcliffe, Jill Alcoe-Holland, Andrea Saulnier	(Nova Scotia) Theresa Breen, Tanya Hilliard, Jocelyn Adams, Amanda Simpson	$8,000
2016	(Nova Scotia) Jill Brothers, Erin Carmody, Blisse Joyce, Jenn Brine	(Prince Edward Island) Robyn MacPhee, Sarah Fullerton, Meaghan Hughes, Michelle McQuaid	$8,800
2017	(Nova Scotia) Theresa Breen, Marlee Powers, Jocelyn Adams, Amanda Simpson	(Prince Edward Island) Veronica Smith, Jane DiCarlo, Sabrina Smith, Whitney Young	$7,500
2018	(New Brunswick) Andrea Crawford, Jillian Babin, Jennifer Armstrong, Katie Forward	(Nova Scotia) Mary-Anne Arsenault, Christina Black, Jenn Baxter, Kristin Clarke	$7,500
2019	(New Brunswick) Andrea Crawford, Jennifer Armstrong, Jillian Babin, Katie Forward	(Prince Edward Island) Suzanne Birt, Marie Christianson, Meaghan Hughes, Michelle McQuaid	$10,000
2020	Cancelled		
2021	(New Brunswick) Andrea Crawford, Sylvie Quillian, Jillian Babin, Jaclyn Tingley	(Nova Scotia) Christina Black, Jenn Baxter, Karlee Jones, Shelley Barker	$6,000
2022	(Prince Edward Island) Suzanne Birt, Colleen Jones, Meaghan Hughes, Sinead Dolan	(Nova Scotia) Sarah Murphy, Erin Carmody, Kate Callaghan, Jenn Mitchell	$6,000
2023	(New Brunswick) Abby Burgess, Brooke Tracy, Sarah Gaines, Sierra Tracy	(New Brunswick) Sylvie Quillian, Sarah Mallais, Carol Webb, Jane Boyle	$6,000
2024	(New Brunswick) Sylvie Quillian, Jennifer Armstrong, Erin Carmody, Katie Vandenborre	(Nova Scotia) Kristen MacDiarmid, Kristen Lind, Liz Woodworth, Julia Colter	$6,000

=== Men ===
Year	Winning team	Runner-up team	Purse (CAD)
2019	(New Brunswick) Scott Jones, Jeremy Mallais, Brian King, Robert Daley	(New Brunswick) Ed Cyr, Alex Robichaud, Chris Wagner, Alex Kyle	$11,200
2020	Cancelled		
2021	(New Brunswick) James Grattan, Paul Dobson, Andy McCann, Jamie Brannen	(Nova Scotia) Matthew Manuel, Luke Saunders, Jeffrey Meagher, Nick Zachernuk	$12,750
2022	(Prince Edward Island) Tyler Smith, Adam Cocks, Edward White, Ryan Lowery	(Nova Scotia) Stuart Thompson, Kendal Thompson, Colten Steele, Michael Brophy	$12,400
2023	(Quebec) Julien Tremblay (Fourth), Jean-Michel Arsenault (Skip), Jesse Mullen, Philippe Brassard	(Nova Scotia) Stuart Thompson, Cameron MacKenzie, Travis Colter, Phil Crowell	$12,400
2024	(New Brunswick) Jeremy Mallais (Fourth), Scott Jones (Skip), Brian King, Jared Bezanson	(Nova Scotia) Kendal Thompson, Stuart Thompson, Bryce Everist, Michael Brophy	$12,400
