= 2013 Prince Edward Island Scotties Tournament of Hearts =

- Host city: Charlottetown, Prince Edward Island
- Arena: Charlottetown Curling Club
- Dates: January 24–27
- Winner: Suzanne Birt
- Curling club: Charlottetown Curling Club
- Skip: Suzanne Birt
- Third: Shelly Bradley
- Second: Sarah Fullerton
- Lead: Leslie MacDougall
- Finalist: Kim Dolan

The 2013 Prince Edward Island Scotties Tournament of Hearts, Prince Edward Island's women's provincial curling championship, was held from January 24 to 27 at the Charlottetown Curling Club in Charlottetown, Prince Edward Island. The winning team will represent Prince Edward Island at the 2013 Scotties Tournament of Hearts in Kingston, Ontario.

== Teams ==
The teams are listed as follows:

Skip	Third	Second	Lead	Alternate	Locale
Suzanne Birt	Shelly Bradley	Sarah Fullerton	Leslie MacDougall		Charlottetown Curling Club, Charlottetown
Tammy Dewar	Darlene London	Tracy Yorston-Campbell	Gail Greene		Montague Curling Club, Montague
Kim Dolan	Rebecca Jean MacDonald	Sinead Dolan	Michala Robinson		Charlottetown Curling Club, Charlottetown
Lisa Jackson	Carolyn Coulson	Melissa Morrow	Hillary Thompson		Charlottetown Curling Club, Charlottetown
Meaghan Hughes (fourth)	Kathy O'Rourke (skip)	Jackie Reid	Tricia Affleck	Stefanie Clark	Charlottetown Curling Club, Charlottetown

== Round robin standings ==
Final Round Robin Standings

Key
Teams to Playoffs
Teams to Tiebreaker

Skip (Club)	W	L	PF	PA
Suzanne Birt (Charlottetown)	4	0	30	13
Kathy O'Rourke (Charlottetown)	2	2	27	22
Kim Dolan (Charlottetown)	2	2	22	17
Lisa Jackson (Charlottetown)	2	2	19	27
Tammy Dewar (Montague)	0	4	12	31

== Round robin results ==
=== Draw 1 ===
Thursday, January 24, 2:00 pm

Sheet 3	1	2	3	4	5	6	7	8	9	10	Final
Kathy O'Rourke	0	2	0	0	0	2	1	0	1	1	7
Kim Dolan	0	0	0	1	1	0	0	2	0	0	4

Sheet 4	1	2	3	4	5	6	7	8	9	10	11	Final
Lisa Jackson	0	0	0	0	1	0	1	1	2	1	1	7
Tammy Dewar	1	0	2	2	0	1	0	0	0	0	0	6

=== Draw 2 ===
Thursday, January 24, 7:00 pm

Sheet 2	1	2	3	4	5	6	7	8	9	10	Final
Tammy Dewar	0	0	0	0	0	1	1	0	X	X	2
Kim Dolan	2	0	2	1	1	0	0	3	X	X	9

Sheet 3	1	2	3	4	5	6	7	8	9	10	Final
Lisa Jackson	0	0	0	0	0	2	0	X	X	X	2
Suzanne Birt	1	1	1	2	1	0	2	X	X	X	8

=== Draw 3 ===
Friday, January 25, 9:00 am

Sheet 2	1	2	3	4	5	6	7	8	9	10	Final
Kathy O'Rourke	1	0	0	0	2	2	0	0	1	0	6
Lisa Jackson	0	0	0	3	0	0	3	1	0	1	8

Sheet 4	1	2	3	4	5	6	7	8	9	10	Final
Tammy Dewar	0	0	1	1	0	0	0	1	X	X	3
Suzanne Birt	1	2	0	0	1	2	1	0	X	X	7

=== Draw 4 ===
Friday, January 25, 2:00 pm

Sheet 2	1	2	3	4	5	6	7	8	9	10	Final
Suzanne Birt	0	0	1	1	0	0	0	2	2	X	6
Kim Dolan	0	0	0	0	0	2	0	0	0	X	2

Sheet 3	1	2	3	4	5	6	7	8	9	10	Final
Kathy O'Rourke	0	2	1	2	3	X	X	X	X	X	8
Tammy Dewar	1	0	0	0	0	X	X	X	X	X	1

=== Draw 5 ===
Saturday, January 26, 2:00 pm

Sheet 3	1	2	3	4	5	6	7	8	9	10	Final
Lisa Jackson	0	0	0	1	0	0	0	1	0	X	2
Kim Dolan	1	0	1	0	1	1	1	0	2	X	7

Sheet 4	1	2	3	4	5	6	7	8	9	10	Final
Kathy O'Rourke	0	2	0	1	0	0	1	0	2	0	6
Suzanne Birt	1	0	2	0	2	1	0	1	0	2	9

== Tiebreaker ==
Saturday, January 26, 7:15 pm

Sheet 2	1	2	3	4	5	6	7	8	9	10	Final
Kim Dolan	0	1	0	1	0	0	2	0	2	X	6
Lisa Jackson	0	0	1	0	1	1	0	1	0	X	4

== Playoffs ==
Semifinal			Final
			1	Suzanne Birt	6
2	Kathy O'Rourke	3	3	Kim Dolan	3
3	Kim Dolan	7

=== Semifinal ===
Sunday, January 27, 2:00 pm

Sheet 2	1	2	3	4	5	6	7	8	9	10	Final
Kathy O'Rourke	0	0	2	0	1	0	0	0	0	X	3
Kim Dolan	0	2	0	1	0	0	1	2	1	X	7

=== Final ===
Sunday, January 27, 7:00 pm

Sheet 3	1	2	3	4	5	6	7	8	9	10	Final
Suzanne Birt	0	2	0	0	0	2	0	2	0	X	6
Kim Dolan	0	0	1	0	1	0	1	0	0	X	3
