= 2009 Prince Edward Island Scotties Tournament of Hearts =

The 2009 Prince Edward Island Scotties Tournament of Hearts, Prince Edward Island's women's provincial curling championship, was held January 22–26 at the Silver Fox Curling and Yacht Club in Summerside. The winner represented team Prince Edward Island at the 2009 Scotties Tournament of Hearts in Victoria, British Columbia.

== Teams ==
Skip	Third	Second	Lead	Club
Suzanne Birt	Shelly Bradley	Leslie MacDougall	Stefanie Clark	Charlottetown Curling Club, Charlottetown
Donna Butler	Marie Molyneaux	Melissa Andrews	Carolyn Coulson	Cornwall Curling Club, Cornwall
Karen Currie	Valerie Acorn	Tracy MacDonald	Cyndie Cunneyworth	Cornwall Curling Club, Cornwall
Kim Dolan	Kathy O'Rourke	Nancy Cameron	Tricia Affleck	Charlottetown Curling Club, Charlottetown
Robyn MacPhee	Rebecca Jean MacPhee	Shelley Muzika	Tammi Lowther	Charlottetown Curling Club, Charlottetown

== Standings ==
Team	W	L
Birt	3	1
Dolan	3	1
MacPhee	3	1
Butler	1	3
Currie	0	4

== Results ==
=== January 22 ===
- Dolan 12-3 Currie
- Birt 7-4 Butler

=== January 23 ===
- Dolan 9-3 MacPhee
- Butler 10-3 Currie
- MacPhee 13-6 Currie
- Birt 9-8 Dolan

=== January 24 ===
- Birt 12-2 Currie
- MacPhee 8-4 Butler
- MacPhee 7-6 Birt
- Dolan 8-2 Butler

== Page playoffs ==
1 vs. 2, 3 vs. 4, on January 25. Semi-Final and Final on January 26.

Page playoff system
1	Suzanne Birt	7
2	Kim Dolan	10
3	Robyn MacPhee	9
4	Donna Butler	2

Semifinal
1	Suzanne Birt	4
3	Robyn MacPhee	10

Final
2	Kim Dolan	7
3	Robyn MacPhee	9

=== 1 vs. 2 ===
Sheet 2	1	2	3	4	5	6	7	8	9	10	Final
Kim Dolan	0	0	2	0	1	2	3	0	0	2	10
Suzanne Birt	0	3	0	1	0	0	0	0	3	0	7

=== 3 vs. 4 ===
Sheet 4	1	2	3	4	5	6	7	8	9	10	Final
Robyn MacPhee	0	2	0	1	2	0	3	1	X	X	9
Donna Butler	0	0	1	0	0	1	0	0	X	X	2

=== Semi-final ===
Sheet 3	1	2	3	4	5	6	7	8	9	10	Final
Suzanne Birt	1	0	0	2	0	1	0	0	X	X	4
Robyn MacPhee	0	1	4	0	2	0	2	1	X	X	10

=== Final ===
Sheet 4	1	2	3	4	5	6	7	8	9	10	Final
Robyn MacPhee	0	1	2	0	2	0	3	0	0	1	9
Kim Dolan	1	0	0	2	0	2	0	2	0	0	7
