= 2004 Prince Edward Island Scott Tournament of Hearts =

Scottish women's curling tournament in 2004

The 2004 Prince Edward Island Scott Tournament of Hearts was held on Jan. 22–27 at the Cornwall Curling Club in Cornwall, Prince Edward Island. The winning team was Team Suzanne Gaudet, who represented Prince Edward Island, and they finished with a 2-9 round-robin record at the 2004 Scott Tournament of Hearts in Red Deer, Alberta.

== Teams ==
Skip	Third	Second	Lead	Club
Bev Beaton	Connie Simmons	Jean Sinclair	Carol Kennedy	Charlottetown Curling Club, Charlottetown
Shelly Bradley	Stefanie Richard	Lori Robinson	Lisa Jackson	Charlottetown Curling Club, Charlottetown
Donna Butler	Susan MacGregor	Marie Molyneaux	Carolyne Coulson	Cornwall Curling Club, Cornwall
Karen Currie	Valerie Acorn	Brenda Campbell	Cyndie Cunneyworth	Cornwall Curling Club, Cornwall
Suzanne Gaudet	Susan McInnis	Janice MacCallum	Tricia Affleck	Charlottetown Curling Club, Charlottetown
Karen A. Macdonald	Karen E. Macdonald	Brenda MacLean	Kim Aylward	Silver Fox Curling Club, Summerside
Rebecca Jean MacPhee	Robyn MacPhee	Shelley Muzika	Karen Hardy	Charlottetown Curling Club, Charlottetown
Kathy O'Rourke	Julie Scales	Kim Dolan	Marion MacAulay	Charlottetown Curling Club, Charlottetown
Lana Simmons	Jeannette Rivard	Debbie MacMurdo	Patsy Richard	Silver Fox Curling Club, Summerside

=== Draw 1 ===
January 22, Time TBA AT

Sheet A	1	2	3	4	5	6	7	8	9	10	Final
O'Rourke	2	0	3	0	0	0	1	0	2	X	8
Butler	0	1	0	1	1	0	0	1	0	X	4

Sheet B	1	2	3	4	5	6	7	8	9	10	Final
Simmons	0	0	2	1	0	3	0	0	0	1	7
MacDonald	0	1	0	0	2	0	1	1	0	0	5

Sheet C	1	2	3	4	5	6	7	8	9	10	Final
Beaton	0	0	0	2	0	1	2	0	1	X	6
Currie	1	1	0	0	0	0	0	1	0	X	3

Sheet D	1	2	3	4	5	6	7	8	9	10	Final
Bradley	0	1	0	2	0	0	3	2	1	X	9
MacPhee	1	0	1	0	0	2	0	0	0	X	4

=== Draw 2 ===
January 23, 7:00 PM AT

Sheet A	1	2	3	4	5	6	7	8	9	10	Final
MacDonald	1	0	4	3	2	0	2	X	X	X	12
Currie	0	2	0	0	0	1	0	X	X	X	2

Sheet B	1	2	3	4	5	6	7	8	9	10	Final
O'Rourke	1	4	0	4	0	X	X	X	X	X	9
Gaudet	0	0	0	0	0	X	X	X	X	X	0

Sheet C	1	2	3	4	5	6	7	8	9	10	Final
MacPhee	0	2	0	3	0	3	0	4	X	X	12
Butler	0	0	1	0	2	0	1	0	X	X	4

=== Draw 3 ===
January 24, 2:00 PM AT

Sheet A	1	2	3	4	5	6	7	8	9	10	Final
Bradley	0	0	1	0	1	0	1	1	0	X	4
O'Rourke	1	0	0	2	0	4	0	0	1	X	8

Sheet B	1	2	3	4	5	6	7	8	9	10	Final
Currie	1	0	0	2	0	1	0	2	1	X	7
Butler	0	3	1	0	4	0	2	0	0	X	10

Sheet C	1	2	3	4	5	6	7	8	9	10	Final
MacDonald	0	2	0	1	0	0	2	0	0	X	5
Gaudet	2	0	1	0	2	1	0	1	1	X	8

Sheet D	1	2	3	4	5	6	7	8	9	10	Final
Beaton	0	0	3	0	2	3	0	2	X	X	10
Simmons	0	1	0	2	0	0	1	0	X	X	4

=== A Side Final ===
January 24, 7:00 PM AT

Sheet A	1	2	3	4	5	6	7	8	9	10	Final
O'Rourke	0	2	0	0	2	1	0	4	X	X	9
Beaton	1	0	0	1	0	0	1	0	X	X	3

=== Draw 4 ===
January 24, 7:00 PM AT

Sheet B	1	2	3	4	5	6	7	8	9	10	Final
Simmons	0	0	1	0	0	1	0	X	X	X	2
MacPhee	1	1	0	2	1	0	3	X	X	X	8

Sheet C	1	2	3	4	5	6	7	8	9	10	Final
Gaudet	1	0	0	1	0	1	0	2	0	1	6
Bradley	0	1	0	0	1	0	2	0	1	0	5

=== Draw 5 ===
January 25, 2:00 PM AT

Sheet A	1	2	3	4	5	6	7	8	9	10	Final
Bradley	0	1	1	0	1	1	0	1	0	3	8
Butler	1	0	0	1	0	0	2	0	2	0	6

Sheet B	1	2	3	4	5	6	7	8	9	10	Final
MacPhee	0	1	0	1	2	1	0	3	1	X	9
O'Rourke	1	0	2	0	0	0	1	0	0	X	4

Sheet C	1	2	3	4	5	6	7	8	9	10	Final
Gaudet	0	0	2	0	0	1	3	1	1	X	8
Beaton	1	1	0	1	1	0	0	0	0	X	4

Sheet D	1	2	3	4	5	6	7	8	9	10	Final
Macdonald	0	0	0	4	0	1	2	0	X	X	7
Simmons	0	0	1	0	0	0	0	2	X	X	3

=== B Side Final ===
January 25, 7:00 PM AT

Sheet A	1	2	3	4	5	6	7	8	9	10	Final
Gaudet	0	1	1	1	0	2	0	3	X	X	8
MacPhee	0	0	0	0	1	0	1	0	X	X	2

=== Draw 6 ===
January 25, 7:00 PM AT

Sheet B	1	2	3	4	5	6	7	8	9	10	Final
Beaton	0	2	3	0	3	1	0	X	X	X	9
MacDonald	1	0	0	2	0	0	1	X	X	X	4

Sheet C	1	2	3	4	5	6	7	8	9	10	Final
Bradley	0	0	4	0	1	0	1	0	1	X	7
O'Rourke	0	1	0	1	0	1	0	1	0	X	4

=== Draw 7 ===
January 26, 2:00 PM AT

Sheet A	1	2	3	4	5	6	7	8	9	10	Final
Gaudet	0	0	0	0	1	0	0	X	X	X	1
Bradley	1	2	0	3	0	1	5	X	X	X	12

Sheet B	1	2	3	4	5	6	7	8	9	10	Final
Beaton	0	0	0	0	0	1	0	1	X	X	2
MacPhee	0	2	1	1	2	0	1	0	X	X	7

=== C Side Final ===
January 26, 7:00 PM AT

Sheet C	1	2	3	4	5	6	7	8	9	10	11	Final
Bradley	1	0	0	0	1	1	0	3	0	2	0	8
MacPhee	0	0	0	3	0	0	2	0	3	0	1	9

== Playoffs ==
Semifinal		Final
		Kathy O'Rourke	4
Suzanne Gaudet	10	Suzanne Gaudet	8
Rebecca Jean MacPhee	4

=== Semi-final ===
January 27, 2:00 PM AT

Sheet A	1	2	3	4	5	6	7	8	9	10	Final
Gaudet	2	0	1	0	2	0	1	0	4	X	10
MacPhee	0	0	0	1	0	2	0	1	0	X	4

=== Final ===
January 26, 7:00 PM AT

Sheet A	1	2	3	4	5	6	7	8	9	10	Final
O'Rourke	0	1	0	0	1	0	1	1	0	X	4
Gaudet	1	0	3	1	0	1	0	0	2	X	8
