= 2003 Prince Edward Island Scott Tournament of Hearts =

The 2003 Prince Edward Island Scott Tournament of Hearts, a women's curling event, was held January 17–20, at the Montague Curling Club in Montague, Prince Edward Island. The winning team was Team Suzanne Gaudet who represented Prince Edward Island, finished with a 10-1 round-robin record and finished 3rd overall in the page playoff at the 2003 Scott Tournament of Hearts in Kitchener, Ontario.

== Teams ==
Skip	Third	Second	Lead	Club
Shirley Berry	Arleen Harris	Linda Fairhurst	Karen McIntee	Cornwall Curling Club, Cornwall
Shelly Bradley	Janice MacCallum	Leslie MacDougall	Tricia MacGregor	Charlottetown Curling Club, Charlottetown
Donna Butler	Krista Cameron	Marie Molyneaux	Carolyne Coulson	Cornwall Curling Club, Cornwall
Tammy Dewar	Gail Greene	April Ennis	Susan Watts	Montague Curling Club, Montague, Prince Edward Island
Jennifer Dixon	June Moyaert	Ashleigh Ramsay	Linda Scott	Montague Curling Club, Montague, Prince Edward Island
Kathie Gallant	Tammy Lowther	Marion MacAulay	Shelley Muzika	Charlottetown Curling Club, Charlottetown
Suzanne Gaudet	Rebecca Jean MacPhee	Robyn MacPhee	Susan McInnis	Charlottetown Curling Club, Charlottetown
Kathy O'Rourke	Julie Scales	Kim Dolan	Marion MacAulay	Charlottetown Curling Club, Charlottetown

=== A Event ===
Round of 16

Quarterfinals
Dixon	5
O'Rourke	8
Bradley	4
Gallant	5
Butler	4
Dewar	5
Berry	2
Gaudet	10

Semifinals
O'Rourke	8
Gallant	5
Dewar	3
Gaudet	11

A Qualifier
O'Rourke	9
Gaudet	8

=== B event ===
Round of 16
Dixon	5
Bradley	7
Butler	9
Berry	3

Quarterfinals
Dewar	6
Bradley	10
Gallant	6
Butler	7

Semifinals
Bradley	10
O'Rourke	4
Butler	5
Guadet	8

Finals
O'Rourke	8
Gaudet	4

=== C event ===
Round of 16
Dixon	4
Gallant	7
Berry	6
Dewar	8

Quarterfinals
Gallant	7
Bradley	6
Dewar	2
Butler	10

Semifinals
Gaudet	6
Gallant	5
O'Rourke	6
Butler	7

Finals
Gaudet	7
Butler	4

== Playoffs ==
Semifinal		Final
		Suzanne Gaudet	5
Kathy O'Rourke	4	Kathy O'Rourke	3
Suzanne Gaudet	8

=== Semi-final ===
January 22, 2:00 PM AT

Sheet A	1	2	3	4	5	6	7	8	9	10	Final
O'Rourke	1	0	0	0	1	0	0	1	1	X	4
Gaudet	0	2	3	1	0	0	2	0	0	X	8

=== Final ===
January 22, 7:00 PM AT

Sheet A	1	2	3	4	5	6	7	8	9	10	Final
O'Rourke	0	0	1	0	0	1	0	1	0	X	3
Gaudet	0	0	0	1	1	0	1	0	2	X	5
