= 2005 Prince Edward Island Scott Tournament of Hearts =

The 2005 Prince Edward Island Scott Tournament of Hearts was held Jan. 21–26 in at the Crapaud Community Curling Club in Crapaud, Prince Edward Island. The winning team was Team Rebecca Jean MacPhee who represented Prince Edward Island, finished with a 4-7 round-robin record at the 2005 Scott Tournament of Hearts in St. John's, Newfoundland and Labrador.

== Teams ==
Skip	Third	Second	Lead	Club
Melissa Andrews	Terri Wood	Diana MacKay	Rosie MacFarlane	Crapaud Community Curling Club, Crapaud, Prince Edward Island
Bev Beaton	Connie Simmons	Jean Sinclair	Carol Kennedy	Charlottetown Curling Club, Charlottetown
Shirley Berry	Arleen Harris	Brenda MacMillan	Cathy MacDougall	Cornwall Curling Club, Cornwall
Donna Butler	Marie Molyneaux	Jackie Reid	Carolyne Coulson	Cornwall Curling Club, Cornwall
Karen Currie	Valerie Acorn	Brenda Campbell	Cyndie Cunneyworth	Cornwall Curling Club, Cornwall
Tammy Dewar	June Moyaert	Gail Greene	Cheryl Dickie	Montague Curling Club, Montague
Suzanne Gaudet	Susan McInnis	Janice MacCallum	Nancy Cameron	Charlottetown Curling Club, Charlottetown
Leslie MacDougall	Heather Mader	Lori Robinson	Shelley Muzika	Charlottetown Curling Club, Charlottetown
Rebecca Jean MacPhee	Shelly Bradley	Robyn MacPhee	Stefanie Richard	Charlottetown Curling Club, Charlottetown
Nola Murphy	Jeanne Duffenais	Lori Palmer	Paula Baglole	Silver Fox Curling Club, Summerside
Kathy O'Rourke	Kim Dolan	Tammy Lowther	Julie Scales	Charlottetown Curling Club, Charlottetown

=== Draw 1 ===
January 21, 9:00 AM AT

Sheet A	1	2	3	4	5	6	7	8	9	10	Final
Murphy	0	2	0	1	1	1	0	0	1	X	6
MacDougall	1	0	3	0	0	0	2	2	0	X	8

Sheet B	1	2	3	4	5	6	7	8	9	10	Final
Butler	4	0	0	1	0	1	1	0	4	X	11
Andrews	0	1	1	0	1	0	0	1	0	X	4

Sheet C	1	2	3	4	5	6	7	8	9	10	Final
Dewar	1	0	1	0	0	3	0	1	0	X	6
Currie	0	1	0	1	0	0	0	0	1	X	3

Sheet D	1	2	3	4	5	6	7	8	9	10	Final
Berry	0	0	1	0	0	0	1	0	3	X	5
Beaton	1	0	0	0	0	0	0	1	0	X	2

=== Draw 2 ===
January 21, 2:00 PM AT

Sheet A	1	2	3	4	5	6	7	8	9	10	Final
Berry	0	1	0	1	1	0	0	X	X	X	3
O'Rourke	1	0	2	0	0	5	1	X	X	X	9

Sheet B	1	2	3	4	5	6	7	8	9	10	Final
MacDougall	0	0	0	0	1	X	X	X	X	X	1
MacPhee	0	1	3	3	0	X	X	X	X	X	7

Sheet C	1	2	3	4	5	6	7	8	9	10	Final
Dewar	0	0	1	0	2	0	1	0	1	0	5
Gaudet	1	1	0	1	0	1	0	1	0	1	6

=== Draw 3 ===
January 21, 7:00 PM AT

Sheet A	1	2	3	4	5	6	7	8	9	10	Final
Currie	0	1	1	0	2	0	2	0	1	X	7
Beaton	2	0	0	3	0	5	0	1	0	X	11

Sheet B	1	2	3	4	5	6	7	8	9	10	Final
Murphy	1	0	0	4	3	0	2	1	X	X	11
Berry	0	2	1	0	0	1	0	0	X	X	4

Sheet C	1	2	3	4	5	6	7	8	9	10	Final
Dewar	1	1	0	4	0	2	0	0	3	X	11
Andrews	0	0	1	0	2	0	1	2	0	X	6

=== Draw 4 ===
January 22, 9:00 AM AT

Sheet A	1	2	3	4	5	6	7	8	9	10	Final
Gaudet	1	0	2	0	1	0	0	0	1	1	6
O'Rourke	0	1	0	2	0	1	2	2	0	0	8

Sheet B	1	2	3	4	5	6	7	8	9	10	Final
Butler	0	0	1	1	0	0	1	0	0	1	4
MacPhee	1	0	0	0	2	2	0	0	0	0	5

=== Draw 5 ===
January 22, 2:00 PM AT

Sheet A	1	2	3	4	5	6	7	8	9	10	Final
Andrews	2	3	0	0	0	2	0	2	0	1	10
Currie	0	0	4	1	1	0	1	0	2	0	9

Sheet B	1	2	3	4	5	6	7	8	9	10	11	Final
Beaton	1	0	0	1	1	0	2	0	0	3	0	8
MacDougall	0	1	1	0	0	2	0	3	1	0	1	9

Sheet C	1	2	3	4	5	6	7	8	9	10	Final
Murphy	0	0	1	1	0	2	2	2	0	X	0
Dewar	1	1	0	0	2	0	0	0	2	X	0

=== A Side Final ===
January 22, 7:00 PM AT

Sheet C	1	2	3	4	5	6	7	8	9	10	Final
MacPhee	1	2	3	0	2	0	2	X	X	X	10
O'Rourke	0	0	0	0	1	0	2	X	X	X	3

=== Draw 6 ===
January 22, 7:00 PM AT

Sheet A	1	2	3	4	5	6	7	8	9	10	Final
Murphy	0	0	1	1	0	1	0	0	0	X	3
Gaudet	0	3	0	0	1	0	2	3	1	X	10

Sheet B	1	2	3	4	5	6	7	8	9	10	Final
Butler	0	1	1	1	0	0	2	1	2	X	8
MacDougall	2	0	0	0	3	0	0	0	0	X	5

=== Draw 7 ===
January 25, 11:00 AM AT

Sheet A	1	2	3	4	5	6	7	8	9	10	Final
Andrews	0	0	0	2	X	X	X	X	X	X	2
Dewar	3	3	2	0	X	X	X	X	X	X	8

Sheet B	1	2	3	4	5	6	7	8	9	10	Final
Berry	1	0	1	2	0	1	2	0	2	X	9
Beaton	0	2	0	0	2	0	0	1	0	X	5

=== Draw 8 ===
January 25, 3:00 PM AT

Sheet A	1	2	3	4	5	6	7	8	9	10	Final
Dewar	0	1	0	2	1	0	1	0	0	X	5
MacDougall	1	0	4	0	0	1	0	3	1	X	10

Sheet B	1	2	3	4	5	6	7	8	9	10	Final
Gaudet	1	0	1	1	0	0	0	2	0	0	5
MacPhee	0	1	0	0	0	2	2	0	1	2	8

Sheet C	1	2	3	4	5	6	7	8	9	10	Final
Berry	1	1	0	3	0	0	1	0	1	X	7
Murphy	0	0	1	0	1	1	0	1	0	X	4

Sheet D	1	2	3	4	5	6	7	8	9	10	Final
O'Rourke	0	2	0	2	2	0	1	0	2	X	9
Butler	1	0	1	0	0	3	0	1	0	X	6

=== B Side Final ===
January 25, 7:00 PM AT

Sheet B	1	2	3	4	5	6	7	8	9	10	Final
O'Rourke	0	0	1	0	2	0	1	0	2	0	6
MacPhee	0	1	0	1	0	3	0	1	0	1	7

=== Draw 9 ===
January 25, 7:00 PM AT

Sheet A	1	2	3	4	5	6	7	8	9	10	Final
Butler	0	0	2	1	1	0	1	0	0	X	5
Berry	2	4	0	0	0	1	0	2	3	X	12

Sheet C	1	2	3	4	5	6	7	8	9	10	Final
MacDougall	0	1	0	0	1	1	0	0	X	X	3
Gaudet	3	0	2	1	0	0	3	1	X	X	10

=== Draw 10 ===
January 26, 2:00 PM AT

Sheet A	1	2	3	4	5	6	7	8	9	10	Final
Gaudet	3	1	0	0	2	0	1	2	3	X	12
O'Rourke	0	0	1	3	0	3	0	0	0	X	7

Sheet B	1	2	3	4	5	6	7	8	9	10	Final
MacPhee	0	2	3	0	1	2	1	X	X	X	9
Berry	1	0	0	1	0	0	0	X	X	X	2

=== C Side Final ===
January 26, 7:00 PM AT

Sheet A	1	2	3	4	5	6	7	8	9	10	Final
Gaudet	1	2	0	2	0	0	0	0	0	0	5
MacPhee	0	0	1	0	1	1	2	1	0	1	7

=== Final ===
January 27, 10:00 AM AT Not Needed

Sheet A	1	2	3	4	5	6	7	8	9	10	Final
MacPhee	0	0	0	0	0	0	0	0	0	0	0
MacPhee	0	0	0	0	0	0	0	0	0	0	0

- Team MacPhee won A, B and C finals therefore a championship final was not needed.
