= 2006 Prince Edward Island Scott Tournament of Hearts =

The 2006 Prince Edward Island Scott Tournament of Hearts was held Jan. 19–22 in at the Maple Leaf Curling Club in O'Leary, Prince Edward Island. The winning team was Team Suzanne Gaudet who represented Prince Edward Island, finished with a 4-7 round-robin record at the 2006 Scott Tournament of Hearts in London, Ontario.

== Teams ==
Skip	Third	Second	Lead	Club
Bev Beaton	Connie Simmons	Jean Sinclair	Carol Kennedy	Charlottetown Curling Club, Charlottetown
Shelly Bradley	Janice MacCallum	Krista Cameron	Leslie MacDougall	Charlottetown Curling Club, Charlottetown
Shirley Berry	Arleen Harris	Sherren Morrison	Ruth Stavert	Cornwall Curling Club, Cornwall
Karen Currie	Valerie Acorn	Terri Wood	Cyndie Cunneyworth	Cornwall Curling Club, Cornwall
Suzanne Gaudet	Susan McInnis	Nancy Cameron	Tricia Affleck	Charlottetown Curling Club, Charlottetown
Kathy O'Rourke	Rebecca Jean MacPhee	Kim Dolan	Tammy Lowther	Charlottetown Curling Club, Charlottetown

=== Draw 1 ===
January 19, 7:00 PM AT

Sheet A	1	2	3	4	5	6	7	8	9	10	Final
O'Rourke	1	0	0	1	0	0	4	0	0	0	6
Bradley	0	1	0	0	1	0	0	2	2	1	7

Sheet B	1	2	3	4	5	6	7	8	9	10	Final
Currie	0	0	1	0	2	0	1	0	0	X	4
Gaudet	0	1	0	4	0	4	0	0	1	X	10

Sheet C	1	2	3	4	5	6	7	8	9	10	Final
Beaton	0	1	0	0	3	0	0	1	2	X	7
Berry	1	0	2	0	0	1	1	0	0	X	5

=== Draw 2 ===
January 20, 10:00 AM AT

Sheet A	1	2	3	4	5	6	7	8	9	10	11	Final
Gaudet	0	2	0	1	0	1	0	0	4	0	1	9
Berry	2	0	2	0	1	0	1	1	0	1	0	8

Sheet B	1	2	3	4	5	6	7	8	9	10	Final
Beaton	0	1	0	0	1	0	0	0	2	X	4
O'Rourke	1	0	0	0	0	1	3	0	0	X	5

Sheet C	1	2	3	4	5	6	7	8	9	10	Final
Currie	1	0	0	0	0	1	0	0	X	X	2
Bradley	0	2	1	3	3	0	2	1	X	X	12

=== Draw 3 ===
January 20, 3:00 PM AT

Sheet A	1	2	3	4	5	6	7	8	9	10	Final
Bradley	0	2	0	0	2	1	0	3	0	X	8
Berry	1	0	1	1	0	0	1	0	2	X	6

Sheet B	1	2	3	4	5	6	7	8	9	10	Final
Beaton	0	2	2	0	1	0	1	0	0	0	6
Gaudet	1	0	0	1	0	2	0	3	1	1	9

Sheet C	1	2	3	4	5	6	7	8	9	10	Final
Carrie	2	1	0	2	2	0	0	0	0	X	7
O'Rourke	0	0	3	0	0	3	1	2	4	X	13

=== Draw 4 ===
January 21, 10:00 AM AT

Sheet A	1	2	3	4	5	6	7	8	9	10	Final
Beaton	1	0	2	0	2	0	1	0	6	X	12
Currie	0	0	0	1	0	1	0	1	0	X	3

Sheet B	1	2	3	4	5	6	7	8	9	10	Final
O'Rourke	1	0	3	0	3	0	5	X	X	X	12
Berry	0	1	0	1	0	1	0	X	X	X	3

Sheet C	1	2	3	4	5	6	7	8	9	10	Final
Gaudet	0	1	0	1	0	1	2	0	0	2	7
Bradley	1	0	1	0	1	0	0	2	1	0	6

=== Draw 5 ===
January 21, 3:00 PM AT

Sheet A	1	2	3	4	5	6	7	8	9	10	Final
Berry	4	3	1	0	2	0	1	X	X	X	11
Currie	0	0	0	2	0	0	0	X	X	X	2

Sheet B	1	2	3	4	5	6	7	8	9	10	Final
Gaudet	0	1	0	0	2	0	2	3	X	X	8
O'Rourke	0	0	0	1	0	1	0	0	X	X	2

Sheet C	1	2	3	4	5	6	7	8	9	10	Final
Bradley	2	1	0	0	1	4	X	X	X	X	8
Beaton	0	0	0	1	0	0	X	X	X	X	1

== Playoffs ==
Semifinal		Final
		Shelly Bradley	3
Shelly Bradley	7	Suzanne Gaudet	11
Kathy O'Rourke	6

=== Semi-final ===
January 22, 1:00 PM AT

Sheet A	1	2	3	4	5	6	7	8	9	10	Final
Bradley	0	1	0	1	1	0	2	0	0	2	7
O'Rourke	0	0	2	0	0	2	0	1	1	0	6

=== Final ===
January 22, 6:00 PM AT

Sheet A	1	2	3	4	5	6	7	8	9	10	Final
Bradley	0	1	0	0	0	1	1	0	X	X	3
Gaudet	1	0	2	2	2	0	0	4	X	X	11
