= 2010 Prince Edward Island Scotties Tournament of Hearts =

The 2010 Prince Edward Island Scotties Tournament of Hearts was held Jan. 2–5 in at the Montague Curling Club in Montague, Prince Edward Island. The winning Erin Carmody team represented Prince Edward Island at the 2010 Scotties Tournament of Hearts in Sault Ste. Marie, Ontario.

== Teams ==
Skip	Third	Second	Lead	Club
Shirley Berry	Sandy Hope	Shelley Ebbett	Arleen Harris	Cornwall Curling Club, Cornwall
Suzanne Birt	Shelly Bradley	Leslie MacDougall	Stefanie Clark	Charlottetown Curling Club, Charlottetown
Donna Butler	Carolyn Coulson	Melissa Andrews	Lori Brine	Cornwall Curling Club, Cornwall
Tammy Dewar	Julie Moyaert	Darlene London	Gail Greene	Montague Curling Club, Montague
Lisa Jackson	Jackie Reid	Jodi Murphy	Heather Mader	Charlottetown Curling Club, Charlottetown
Rebecca Jean MacPhee	Robyn MacPhee	Kim Dolan	Nancy Cameron	Charlottetown Curling Club, Charlottetown
Erin Carmody	Geri-Lynn Ramsay	Kathy O'Rourke (skip)	Tricia Affleck	Charlottetown Curling Club, Charlottetown

== Draws ==
A Side		Semifinals		Finals
		MacPhee	4
Butler	5	O'Rourke	10
O'Rourke	8			O'Rourke	9
Jackson	8			Jackson	5
Dewar	4	Jackson	6
Berry	6	Berry	4
Birt	5

B Side
Dewar	8
Birt	7

Quarterfinals
Dewar	7
MacPhee	6
Butler	7
Berry	4

Semifinals
Jackson	8
Dewar	9
O'Rourke	9
Butler	3

Finals
Dewar	6
O'Rourke	3

C Side
Birt	9
Berry	2

Quarterfinals
Birt	8
Jackson	2
MacPhee	1
Butler	8

Semifinals
O'Rourke	8
Birt	7
Dewar	4
Butler	7

Finals
O'Rourke	7
Butler	5

Final
Dewar	6
O'Rourke	8

Sheet 3	1	2	3	4	5	6	7	8	9	10	Final
Kathy O'Rourke	0	0	3	0	1	0	1	0	1	2	8
Tammy Dewar	1	0	0	1	0	3	0	1	0	0	6
