= 2008 Prince Edward Island Scotties Tournament of Hearts =

The 2008 Prince Edward Island Scotties Tournament of Hearts was held Jan. 18–22 in at the Charlottetown Curling Club in Charlottetown, Prince Edward Island. The winning team was Team Suzanne Gaudet, who went on to represent Prince Edward Island at the 2008 Scotties Tournament of Hearts in Regina, Saskatchewan, finishing with a 3–8 record.

== Teams ==
Skip	Third	Second	Lead	Club
Shirley Berry	Danielle Girard	Arleen Harris	Carole Sweetapple	Cornwall Curling Club, Cornwall
Shelly Bradley	Tammi Lowther	Janice MacCallum	Tricia Affleck	Charlottetown Curling Club, Charlottetown
Donna Butler	Marie Molyneaux	Melissa Andrews	Carolyn Coulson	Cornwall Curling Club, Cornwall
Krista Cameron	Angela Hynes	Nancy Sinclair	Kristeen Heer	Silver Fox Curling Club, Summerside, Prince Edward Island
Karen Currie	Valerie Acorn	Terri Wood	Cyndie Cunneyworth	Cornwall Curling Club, Cornwall
Suzanne Gaudet	Robyn MacPhee	Carol Webb	Stefanie Clark	Charlottetown Curling Club, Charlottetown
Faith LeClair	Jennifer Compton	Cindy Howard	Flo Birch	Silver Fox Curling Club, Summerside, Prince Edward Island
Rebecca Jean MacPhee	Leslie MacDougall	Shelley Muzika	Julia MacDougall	Charlottetown Curling Club, Charlottetown
Lori Robinson	Lisa Jackson	Jackie Reid	Jody Murphy	Charlottetown Curling Club, Charlottetown

=== Draw 1 ===
January 18, 3:00 PM AT

Sheet A	1	2	3	4	5	6	7	8	9	10	Final
Currie	0	1	0	0	2	0	1	1	0	X	5
Robinson	3	0	2	1	0	1	0	0	1	X	8

Sheet B	1	2	3	4	5	6	7	8	9	10	Final
Cameron	0	1	0	1	0	0	1	0	1	0	4
Gaudet	2	0	1	0	1	0	0	2	0	1	7

Sheet C	1	2	3	4	5	6	7	8	9	10	Final
Bradley	1	2	0	0	1	0	0	1	4	X	9
LeClair	0	0	0	1	0	1	0	0	0	X	2

Sheet D	1	2	3	4	5	6	7	8	9	10	Final
Butler	3	0	0	1	0	2	0	0	0	X	6
Berry	0	2	0	0	1	0	1	0	0	X	4

=== Draw 2 ===
February 18, 8:10 PM AT

Sheet A	1	2	3	4	5	6	7	8	9	10	Final
Cameron	1	1	0	3	1	3	0	1	X	X	10
Currie	0	0	1	0	0	0	1	0	X	X	2

Sheet B	1	2	3	4	5	6	7	8	9	10	Final
Butler	0	0	0	1	0	2	0	0	X	X	3
Bradley	2	1	2	0	3	0	1	1	X	X	10

Sheet C	1	2	3	4	5	6	7	8	9	10	Final
LeClair	1	0	1	1	1	1	0	0	0	X	5
Berry	0	4	0	0	0	0	1	1	2	X	8

Sheet D	1	2	3	4	5	6	7	8	9	10	11	Final
Robinson	0	0	0	2	1	0	0	1	0	1	0	5
MacPhee	0	1	0	0	0	1	2	0	1	0	1	6

=== Draw 3 ===
January 19, 2:00 PM AT

Sheet A	1	2	3	4	5	6	7	8	9	10	Final
Gaudet	1	0	2	1	1	2	1	X	X	X	8
MacPhee	0	1	0	0	0	0	0	X	X	X	1

Sheet B	1	2	3	4	5	6	7	8	9	10	Final
LeClair	2	0	0	0	3	0	0	X	X	X	5
Currie	0	1	4	2	0	2	1	X	X	X	10

Sheet C	1	2	3	4	5	6	7	8	9	10	Final
Butler	2	0	0	2	0	2	2	1	X	X	9
Cameron	0	2	0	0	1	0	0	0	X	X	3

Sheet D	1	2	3	4	5	6	7	8	9	10	11	Final
Berry	2	0	1	0	1	1	1	0	0	1	0	7
Robinson	0	2	0	3	0	0	0	1	1	0	1	8

=== A Side Final ===
January 19, 7:00 PM AT

Sheet B	1	2	3	4	5	6	7	8	9	10	Final
Bradley	1	3	0	0	0	0	3	0	1	X	8
Gaudet	0	0	1	1	2	0	0	1	0	X	5

=== Draw 4 ===
January 19, 7:00 PM AT

Sheet A	1	2	3	4	5	6	7	8	9	10	Final
Berry	1	2	1	0	0	0	0	0	2	1	7
Currie	0	0	0	1	1	1	1	1	0	0	5

Sheet C	1	2	3	4	5	6	7	8	9	10	Final
Robinson	0	0	1	0	1	0	1	0	X	X	3
MacPhee	2	1	0	3	0	2	0	1	X	X	9

=== Draw 5 ===
January 20, 2:00 PM AT

Sheet A	1	2	3	4	5	6	7	8	9	10	Final
Gaudet	0	1	0	1	0	3	0	0	0	1	6
Butler	0	0	1	0	0	0	1	1	2	0	5

Sheet B	1	2	3	4	5	6	7	8	9	10	Final
Cameron	1	0	1	1	0	2	0	2	0	1	8
Robinson	0	0	0	0	2	0	2	0	1	0	5

Sheet C	1	2	3	4	5	6	7	8	9	10	Final
MacPhee	0	2	0	0	0	2	0	2	0	1	7
Bradley	0	0	1	2	0	0	1	0	1	0	5

=== B Side Final ===
January 20, 7:00 PM AT

Sheet A	1	2	3	4	5	6	7	8	9	10	Final
MacPhee	0	1	0	2	0	1	0	0	1	2	7
Gaudet	2	0	2	0	2	0	1	1	0	0	8

=== Draw 6 ===
January 20, 7:00 PM AT

Sheet B	1	2	3	4	5	6	7	8	9	10	Final
Cameron	1	0	1	1	0	0	1	0	1	0	5
Bradley	0	1	0	0	2	1	0	0	0	2	6

Sheet C	1	2	3	4	5	6	7	8	9	10	11	Final
Butler	1	0	1	0	1	0	0	2	0	1	1	7
Berry	0	2	0	1	0	1	0	0	1	0	0	6

=== Draw 7 ===
January 21, 3:00 PM AT

Sheet A	1	2	3	4	5	6	7	8	9	10	Final
Bulter	1	0	0	0	0	2	2	0	0	2	7
MacPhee	0	0	0	1	1	0	0	1	1	0	4

Sheet B	1	2	3	4	5	6	7	8	9	10	Final
Gaudet	0	2	1	2	0	3	0	1	0	X	9
Bradley	1	0	0	0	2	0	2	0	0	X	5

=== C Side Final ===
January 21, 8:00 PM AT

Sheet B	1	2	3	4	5	6	7	8	9	10	Final
Butler	0	2	0	4	1	0	0	0	0	X	7
Gaudet	0	0	1	0	0	3	2	3	1	X	10

=== Final ===
February 18, Time TBA MT

Sheet A	1	2	3	4	5	6	7	8	9	10	Final
Bradley	2	0	0	0	0	0	1	0	X	X	3
Gaudet	0	1	2	0	1	3	0	1	X	X	8
