= Michelle Shea =

Canadian curler (born 1991)

- Curler
- Born: July 30, 1991 (age 35); Charlottetown, Prince Edward Island

Team
- Curling club: Montague CC; Montague, PEI
- Skip: Suzanne Birt
- Third: Michelle Shea
- Second: Meaghan Hughes
- Lead: Sinead Dolan

Curling career
- Member Association: Prince Edward Island
- Hearts: 8 (2015, 2017, 2018, 2019, 2020, 2021, 2022, 2023)
- Top CTRS ranking: 9th (2019–20)

Michelle Dianne Shea (born July 30, 1991, as Michelle McQuaid) is a Canadian curler from Charlottetown, Prince Edward Island. She currently plays third on Team Suzanne Birt. She is a three-time PEI junior champion and eight-time PEI Scotties champion.

== Career ==
Shea competed at the 2007 Canada Winter Games as third for the Sarah Fullerton rink. They finished with a 1–5 record. She represented PEI at three Canadian Junior Curling Championships also as third for Fullerton from 2010 to 2012. In 2010, they finished seventh with a 6–6 record. In 2011, they improved from their previous season finishing in eighth with a 7–5 record. At her final trip to the juniors in 2012, they finished eighth, once again with a 6–6 record. While still in juniors, Team Fullerton entered the 2012 Prince Edward Island Scotties Tournament of Hearts. They finished round robin play with a 4–1 record and clinch second place. In the semifinal they played Kim Dolan. Starting off quite comfortably, Team Fullerton was up 6–1 after the fourth end, however after giving up four stolen points in ends eight and nine, they tied the game in the tenth. After some troubles in the extra end, without hammer, Team Fullerton ultimately lost the game 10–9.

Out of juniors, Shea joined the Suzanne Birt rink for the 2013–14 season with Shelly Bradley and Susan McInnis at third and lead. They won the Royal LePage OVCA Women's Fall Classic World Curling Tour event and finished second at the Curl Atlantic Championship. At the 2014 Prince Edward Island Scotties Tournament of Hearts, they missed the playoffs with a 1–3 record. The next season they were able to win the 2015 Prince Edward Island Scotties Tournament of Hearts by defeating Kathy O'Rourke in the semifinal. They finished in ninth place with a 4–7 record at the 2015 Scotties Tournament of Hearts in Moose Jaw, Saskatchewan. The team disbanded after the season.

After taking a season off, Shea joined the Robyn MacPhee rink as lead for the 2016–17 season. They won the Royal LePage OVCA Women's Fall Classic and finished runner-up at the Lady Monctonian Invitational Spiel. The team was successful at the provincial championship, defeating Veronica Smith in the semifinal of the 2017 Prince Edward Island Scotties Tournament of Hearts. They finished 3–8 at the 2017 Scotties Tournament of Hearts. Team MacPhee also won the provincial championship the following season, and finished 2–6 at the 2018 Scotties Tournament of Hearts. Birt returned to competitive curling after the season and took over as skip for the team.

Team Birt had a very strong 2018–19 season, not missing the playoffs in any of their tour events. They won the WFG Jim Sullivan Curling Classic, finished runner-up at the Tim Hortons Spitfire Arms Cash Spiel and had semifinal finishes at both the Stu Sells Oakville Tankard and the New Scotland Clothing Ladies Cashspiel. The team won five straight sudden-death elimination games at the 2019 Prince Edward Island Scotties Tournament of Hearts to claim the provincial title. The team did improve their record at the 2019 Scotties Tournament of Hearts, finishing in sixth place with a 6–5 record.

Team Birt played in nine tour events the following season and qualified in eight of them, only missing the playoffs at the 2019 AMJ Campbell Shorty Jenkins Classic. This year, they won the Tim Hortons Spitfire Arms Cash Spiel and were finalists at the Atlantic Superstore Monctonian Challenge and the Jim Sullivan Curling Classic. They had semifinal finishes at The Curling Store Cashspiel, the New Scotland Clothing Ladies Cashspiel and the Dave Jones Stanhope Simpson Insurance Mayflower Cashspiel and a quarterfinal appearance at both the Stu Sells Oakville Tankard and the Tour Challenge Tier 2. They defended their title at the 2020 Prince Edward Island Scotties Tournament of Hearts. The team had an eighth-place finish at the 2020 Scotties Tournament of Hearts, finishing with a 5–6 record.

Team Birt began the 2020–21 season with two runner-up finishes at the 2020 The Curling Store Cashspiel and the 2020 Dave Jones Stanhope Simpson Insurance Mayflower Cashspiel. Due to the COVID-19 pandemic in Prince Edward Island, many teams had to opt out of the 2021 Prince Edward Island Scotties Tournament of Hearts as they could not commit to the quarantine process in order to compete in the 2021 Scotties Tournament of Hearts. This meant that only Team Birt and their clubmates Darlene London's rink entered the event. In the best-of-five series, Team Birt defeated Team London three games to zero to earn the right to represent Prince Edward Island at the 2021 Scotties in Calgary, Alberta. At the Tournament of Hearts, they finished a 4–4 round robin record, failing to qualify for the championship round.

The Birt rink had two appearances in finals to begin the 2021–22 season. The team lost in the final of the 2021 Oakville Fall Classic to Team Jamie Sinclair and the final of the 2021 Oakville Labour Day Classic to Team Tracy Fleury. Due to the COVID-19 pandemic in Canada, the qualification process for the 2021 Canadian Olympic Curling Trials had to be modified to qualify enough teams for the championship. In these modifications, Curling Canada created the 2021 Canadian Curling Trials Direct-Entry Event, an event where five teams would compete to try to earn one of three spots into the 2021 Canadian Olympic Curling Trials. Team Birt qualified for the Trials Direct-Entry Event due to their CTRS ranking from the 2019–20 season. The team went 1–3 through the round robin, finishing in last place and not advancing directly to the Trials. Team Birt had one final chance to advance to the Olympic Trials through the 2021 Canadian Olympic Curling Pre-Trials where they finished the round robin with a 4–2 record. This qualified them for the double knockout round, where they lost both of their games and were eliminated. The team had two more tour stops during the season, which included winning the Stu Sells 1824 Halifax Classic and reaching the semifinal of the Tim Hortons Spitfire Arms Cash Spiel. The 2022 Prince Edward Island Scotties Tournament of Hearts was cancelled due to the pandemic and Team Birt were selected to represent their province at the national women's championship. The team finished the 2022 Scotties Tournament of Hearts with a 4–4 record, fifth place in their pool.

In advance of the 2022–23 season, Team Birt won a fan vote which qualified them for the 2022 PointsBet Invitational. They lost their opening round game to the Rachel Homan rink. On tour, the team won two events. In October, they won the Superstore Monctonian Challenge with spares Colleen Jones and Sinead Dolan filling in for Shea and Marie Christianson. They then won the Jim Sullivan Curling Classic in November, going undefeated in the event. They also had a semifinal appearance at the New Scotland Clothing Women's Cashspiel. During the season, Christianson took over skipping duties on the team with Birt continuing to throw fourth stones. In the new year, they easily won the 2023 Prince Edward Island Scotties Tournament of Hearts, winning all three qualifying events. At the 2023 Scotties Tournament of Hearts in Kamloops, the team struggled, finishing seventh in their pool with a 2–6 record. After the season, the team announced they would be disbanding.

== Personal life ==
Shea works as a team lead for Veterans Affairs Canada. She began curling when she was five years old. She is married. Her brother is NHL player Adam McQuaid.

== Teams ==
Season	Skip	Third	Second	Lead
2009–10	Sarah Fullerton	Michelle McQuaid	Sara MacRae	Whitney Young
2010–11	Sarah Fullerton	Michelle McQuaid	Sara MacRae	Whitney Young
2011–12	Sarah Fullerton	Michelle McQuaid	Sara MacRae	Hillary Thompson
2013–14	Suzanne Birt	Shelly Bradley	Michelle McQuaid	Susan McInnis
2014–15	Suzanne Birt	Shelly Bradley	Michelle McQuaid	Susan McInnis
2016–17	Robyn MacPhee	Sarah Fullerton	Meaghan Hughes	Michelle McQuaid
2017–18	Robyn MacPhee	Sarah Fullerton	Meaghan Hughes	Michelle McQuaid
2018–19	Suzanne Birt	Marie Christianson	Meaghan Hughes	Michelle McQuaid
2019–20	Suzanne Birt	Marie Christianson	Meaghan Hughes	Michelle McQuaid
2020–21	Suzanne Birt	Marie Christianson	Meaghan Hughes	Michelle McQuaid
2021–22	Suzanne Birt	Marie Christianson	Meaghan Hughes	Michelle McQuaid
2022–23	Suzanne Birt (Fourth)	Marie Christianson (Skip)	Michelle Shea	Meaghan Hughes
2026–27	Suzanne Birt	Michelle Shea	Meaghan Hughes	Sinead Dolan
