= Marie Christianson =

Canadian curler (born 1988)

- Curler
- Born: August 12, 1988 (age 38); Halifax, Nova Scotia, Canada

Team
- Curling club: Halifax CC; Halifax, NS

Curling career
- Member Association: Nova Scotia (2007–2013; 2017–18; 2023–present); Newfoundland and Labrador (2013–15); Prince Edward Island (2015–16; 2018–2023)
- Hearts: 7 (2016, 2019, 2020, 2021, 2022, 2023, 2024)
- Top CTRS ranking: 9th (2019–20)

Marie Christianson (born August 12, 1988) is a Canadian curler from Halifax, Nova Scotia.

== Career ==
=== Juniors ===
Christianson skipped Team Nova Scotia at two Canadian Junior Curling Championships, in 2007 and 2009. At the 2007 Canadian Junior Curling Championships she skipped the team to a tenth-place finish with a 6–6 record. The team placed ninth at the 2009 Canadian Junior Curling Championships with a 5–7 record. As a Junior, she played in her first Grand Slam of Curling event at the 2007 Sobeys Slam where her team failed to make the playoffs. She also played in the 2010 event, again missing the playoffs.

=== Womens ===
==== 2013–2015 ====
Christianson moved to Newfoundland and Labrador to join the Stacie Devereaux rink in 2013 as the team's second. The team went 1–3 at the 2014 Newfoundland and Labrador Scotties Tournament of Hearts, not making the playoffs. Christianson left the rink the following season to form her own team to try to get to the Hearts. At the 2015 Newfoundland and Labrador Scotties Tournament of Hearts, Christianson led the team to a 2–2 record, just missing the playoffs once again. Following the season, Christianson moved to Prince Edward Island to join the Suzanne Birt rink at lead.

==== 2015–2017 ====
Team Birt played in the 2015 Tour Challenge Tier 2 where they made the quarterfinals. The team also won the Sobeys Classic on the World Curling Tour. Christian would win her first provincial championship in 2016 when the team won the final of the 2016 Prince Edward Island Scotties Tournament of Hearts 5–4 against Kim Dolan. They represented PEI at the 2016 Scotties Tournament of Hearts where they went 4–7.

==== 2017–2018 ====
Christianson moved back to her home province of Nova Scotia for the 2017–18 season to join the Kristen MacDiarmid rink. The team won the Royal LePage OVCA Women's Fall Classic and had semifinal finishes at the Lady Monctonian Invitational Spiel and the Spitfire Arms Cash Spiel. At the 2018 Nova Scotia Scotties Tournament of Hearts, the team made it all the way to the final where they lost to Mary-Anne Arsenault. With their win at the OVCA Women's Fall Classic, the team was invited to play in the 2018 Humpty's Champions Cup Grand Slam event. There, the team went winless. Following the event, Christianson left the team and rejoined the Suzanne Birt rink.

==== 2018–2023 ====
Team Birt had a very strong 2018–19 season, not missing the playoffs in any of their tour events. They won the WFG Jim Sullivan Curling Classic, finished runner-up at the Tim Hortons Spitfire Arms Cash Spiel and had semifinal finishes at both the Stu Sells Oakville Tankard and the New Scotland Clothing Ladies Cashspiel. The team won five straight sudden-death elimination games at the 2019 Prince Edward Island Scotties Tournament of Hearts to claim the provincial title. The team did improve their record at the 2019 Scotties Tournament of Hearts, finishing in sixth place with a 6–5 record.

Team Birt played in nine tour events the following season and qualified in eight of them, only missing the playoffs at the 2019 AMJ Campbell Shorty Jenkins Classic. This year, they won the Tim Hortons Spitfire Arms Cash Spiel and were finalists at the Atlantic Superstore Monctonian Challenge and the Jim Sullivan Curling Classic. They had semifinal finishes at The Curling Store Cashspiel, the New Scotland Clothing Ladies Cashspiel and the Dave Jones Stanhope Simpson Insurance Mayflower Cashspiel and a quarterfinal appearance at both the Stu Sells Oakville Tankard and the Tour Challenge Tier 2. They defended their title at the 2020 Prince Edward Island Scotties Tournament of Hearts, winning a second championship in a row. the team had an eighth-place finish at the 2020 Scotties Tournament of Hearts, finishing with a 5–6 record.

Team Birt began the 2020–21 season with two runner-up finishes at the 2020 The Curling Store Cashspiel and the 2020 Dave Jones Stanhope Simpson Insurance Mayflower Cashspiel. Due to the COVID-19 pandemic in Prince Edward Island, many teams had to opt out of the 2021 Prince Edward Island Scotties Tournament of Hearts as they could not commit to the quarantine process in order to compete in the 2021 Scotties Tournament of Hearts. This meant that only Team Birt and their clubmates Darlene London's rink entered the event. Christianson could not compete at the provincial championship as she was living in Halifax, Nova Scotia, meaning alternate Kathy O'Rourke took her position at third. In the best-of-five series, Team Birt defeated Team London three games to zero to earn the right to represent Prince Edward Island at the 2021 Scotties in Calgary, Alberta. At the Tournament of Hearts, they finished a 4–4 round robin record, failing to qualify for the championship round.

The Birt rink had two appearances in finals to begin the 2021–22 season. The team lost in the final of the 2021 Oakville Fall Classic to Team Jamie Sinclair and the final of the 2021 Oakville Labour Day Classic to Team Tracy Fleury. Due to the COVID-19 pandemic in Canada, the qualification process for the 2021 Canadian Olympic Curling Trials had to be modified to qualify enough teams for the championship. In these modifications, Curling Canada created the 2021 Canadian Curling Trials Direct-Entry Event, an event where five teams would compete to try to earn one of three spots into the 2021 Canadian Olympic Curling Trials. Team Birt qualified for the Trials Direct-Entry Event due to their CTRS ranking from the 2019–20 season. The team went 1–3 through the round robin, finishing in last place and not advancing directly to the Trials. Team Birt had one final chance to advance to the Olympic Trials through the 2021 Canadian Olympic Curling Pre-Trials where they finished the round robin with a 4–2 record. This qualified them for the double knockout round, where they lost both of their games and were eliminated. The team had two more tour stops during the season, which included winning the Stu Sells 1824 Halifax Classic and reaching the semifinal of the Tim Hortons Spitfire Arms Cash Spiel. The 2022 Prince Edward Island Scotties Tournament of Hearts was cancelled due to the pandemic and Team Birt were selected to represent their province at the national women's championship. The team finished the 2022 Scotties Tournament of Hearts with a 4–4 record, fifth place in their pool.

In advance of the 2022–23 season, Team Birt won a fan vote which qualified them for the 2022 PointsBet Invitational. They lost their opening round game to the Rachel Homan rink. On tour, the team won two events. In October, they won the Superstore Monctonian Challenge with spares Colleen Jones and Sinead Dolan filling in for Christianson and Michelle Shea. They then won the Jim Sullivan Curling Classic in November, going undefeated in the event. They also had a semifinal appearance at the New Scotland Clothing Women's Cashspiel. During the season, Christianson took over skipping duties on the team with Birt continuing to throw fourth stones. In the new year, they easily won the 2023 Prince Edward Island Scotties Tournament of Hearts, winning all three qualifying events. At the 2023 Scotties Tournament of Hearts in Kamloops, the team struggled, finishing seventh in their pool with a 2–6 record. After the season, the team announced they would be disbanding.

==== 2023–present ====
Following her team disbanding in PEI, Christianson moved back to Nova Scotia, forming her own team with Jill Brothers, Heather Smith and Erin Carmody for the 2023–24 season. They had a strong season together, winning the 2024 Nova Scotia Scotties Tournament of Hearts and representing Nova Scotia at the 2024 Scotties Tournament of Hearts. There, Team Smith would finish the round robin with a 3–5 record, missing the championship round. The team would disband after one season together at the end of the season.

=== Mixed ===
Christianson would compete at the 2026 Canadian Mixed Curling Championship as lead on Team Nova Scotia alongside Brent MacDougall as skip, Erin Carmody as third, and Scott Weagle as second. At the national championship, they would finish the round robin with a 7–3 record and would go on to defeat Quebec's Félix Asselin in the semifinal and New Brunswick's Sylvie Quillian 9–5 in the final to win and represent Canada at the World Mixed Curling Championship.

== Personal life ==
Christianson is a registered massage therapist for Brickyard Health. She lives in Eastern Passage.

== Teams ==
Season	Skip	Third	Second	Lead
2006–07	Marie Christianson	Katie Thomas	Liz Woodworth	Jenn Baxter
2008–09	Marie Christianson	Tanya Hilliard	Jane Snyder	Kaitlin Fralic
2009–10	Mary-Anne Arsenault	Marie Christianson	Morgan Muise	Kelly Backman
2010–11	Marie Christianson	Christie Gamble	Jane Snyder	Anna Sampson
2011–12	Marie Christianson	Kristen MacDiarmid	Christina Black	Jane Snyder
2012–13	Marie Christianson	Kristen MacDiarmid	Christina Black	Jane Snyder
2013–14	Stacie Devereaux	Erin Porter	Marie Christianson	Noelle Thomas-Kennell
2014–15	Marie Christianson	Erin Porter	Lauren Wasylkiw	Erica Trickett
2015–16	Suzanne Birt	Robyn Green	Meaghan Hughes	Marie Christianson
2017–18	Kristen MacDiarmid	Marie Christianson	Liz Woodworth	Julia Colter
2018–19	Suzanne Birt	Marie Christianson	Meaghan Hughes	Michelle McQuaid
2019–20	Suzanne Birt	Marie Christianson	Meaghan Hughes	Michelle McQuaid
2020–21	Suzanne Birt	Marie Christianson	Meaghan Hughes	Michelle McQuaid
2021–22	Suzanne Birt	Marie Christianson	Meaghan Hughes	Michelle McQuaid
2022–23	Suzanne Birt (Fourth)	Marie Christianson (Skip)	Michelle Shea	Meaghan Hughes
2023–24	Jill Brothers (Fourth)	Heather Smith (Skip)	Marie Christianson	Erin Carmody
