= 2017 Prince Edward Island Scotties Tournament of Hearts =

Provincial women's curling tournament

- Host city: Summerside, Prince Edward Island
- Arena: Silver Fox Curling and Yacht Community Complex
- Dates: January 18–22
- Winner: Robyn MacPhee
- Curling club: Charlottetown Curling Complex, Charlottetown
- Skip: Robyn MacPhee
- Third: Sarah Fullerton
- Second: Meaghan Hughes
- Lead: Michelle McQuaid
- Finalist: Veronica Smith

The 2017 Prince Edward Island Scotties Tournament of Hearts, the provincial women's curling championship of Prince Edward Island, was held from January 18 to 22 at the Silver Fox Curling and Yacht Community Complex in Summerside, Prince Edward Island. The winning Robyn MacPhee rink represented Prince Edward Island at the 2017 Scotties Tournament of Hearts in St. Catharines, Ontario.

The MacPhee team came from behind to win in the championship final over Veronica Smith by a score of 7–5. The event was held in conjunction with the 2017 PEI Tankard (the men's provincial championship) as part of a "pilot project" by Curl P.E.I., the island's provincial curling association. The Silver Fox club was specifically chosen as the venue because has the most sheets (six) in the province.

== Teams ==
Skip	Third	Second	Lead	Alternate	Club(s)
Tammy Dewar	Darlene MacLeod London	Robyn MacDonald	Gail Greene		Montague Curling Club, Montague
Lisa Jackson	Jaclyn Reid	Melissa Morrow	Jodi Murphy	Julie Scales	Charlottetown Curling Complex, Charlottetown
Robyn MacPhee	Sarah Fullerton	Meaghan Hughes	Michelle McQuaid		Charlottetown Curling Complex, Charlottetown
Veronica Smith	Jane DiCarlo	Whitney Young	Aleya Quilty		Charlottetown Curling Complex, Charlottetown

== Knockout Draw Brackets ==
Brackets:

=== A Event ===
Semifinals		Final
Robyn MacPhee	12
Tammy Dewar	0	Robyn MacPhee	8
Veronica Smith	4	Lisa Jackson	4
Lisa Jackson	7

=== B Event ===
Quarterfinals		Semifinals		Final
Tammy Dewar	3
Veronica Smith	8	Lisa Jackson	2
		Veronica Smith	9
				Veronica Smith	6
				Robyn MacPhee	7

=== C Event ===
Quarterfinals		Semifinals		Final
Tammy Dewar	4
Lisa Jackson	7	Lisa Jackson	4
		Veronica Smith	6
				Veronica Smith	8
				Robyn MacPhee	4

== Playoffs ==
MacPhee Needs To Be Beaten Twice

Semifinal			Final
			A	Robyn MacPhee
B	Robyn MacPhee	7	B	Robyn MacPhee
C	Veronica Smith	5

=== Semifinal ===
Sunday, January 22, 2:30 pm

Sheet 3	1	2	3	4	5	6	7	8	9	10	Final
Veronica Smith	0	1	3	0	0	1	0	0	0	0	5
Robyn MacPhee 🔨	0	0	0	2	1	0	0	2	1	1	7

=== Final ===
Not needed

2017 Prince Edward Island Scotties Tournament of Hearts

Robyn MacPhee
8th Prince Edward Island Provincial Championship title
