= Meaghan Hughes =

Canadian curler (born 1986)

- Curler
- Born: January 3, 1986 (age 40); Charlottetown, Prince Edward Island, Canada

Team
- Curling club: Montague CC; Montague, PEI
- Skip: Suzanne Birt
- Third: Michelle Shea
- Second: Meaghan Hughes
- Lead: Sinead Dolan

Curling career
- Member Association: Prince Edward Island
- Hearts: 8 (2016, 2017, 2018, 2019, 2020, 2021, 2022, 2023)
- Top CTRS ranking: 9th (2019–20)

Meaghan Hughes (born January 3, 1986) is a Canadian curler from Charlottetown, Prince Edward Island. She currently plays second on Team Suzanne Birt. She is a four-time PEI junior champion skip and eight-time PEI Scotties champion.

== Career ==
Hughes played as skip for her junior career, skipping the PEI team at the Canadian Junior Curling Championships from 2003 to 2006. In 2003, her team finished eleventh with a 2–10 record. In 2004, she improved from the previous season finishing in eighth with a 5–7 record. Her best finish was in 2005 where she once again finished eighth but this time with a 6–6 record. At her final trip to the juniors in 2006, she finished in last place with a 3–8 record. Also during her junior career, she won the 17 & Under provincial championship in 2002 and skipped Prince Edward Island to a sixth-place finish at the 2003 Canada Winter Games.

Hughes skipped her team of Stefanie Clark, Jackie Reid and Tricia Affleck at the 2012 Prince Edward Island Scotties Tournament of Hearts where they finished the round robin in first place with a 4–1 record, earning them the bye to the final where they would play Kim Dolan. Despite starting the final with the hammer, she gave up a three ender in the seventh end and a steal of one in the eighth, ultimately losing the match 6–4.

Hughes teamed up with Kathy O'Rourke for the 2012–13 season with Reid and Affleck at second and lead. The team competed at the 2013 Prince Edward Island Scotties Tournament of Hearts where they lost in the semifinal to Kim Dolan. Hughes moved down to third the following season and Robyn MacPhee stepped in to throw fourth rocks for the team. They finished undefeated throughout the round robin of the 2014 Prince Edward Island Scotties Tournament of Hearts but were defeated in the final by Dolan. They had a strong start to the 2014–15 season, winning the Curl Atlantic Championship and finishing second at the Dave Jones Molson Mayflower Cashspiel and the Lady Monctonian Invitational Spiel. Despite their strong season, they once again lost in the semifinal of the 2015 Prince Edward Island Scotties Tournament of Hearts, this time to Suzanne Birt.

Team O'Rourke disbanded after the season and Hughes and Green joined Birt's rink that had also disbanded. They played in the 2015 Tour Challenge Tier 2 where they made the quarterfinals. The team also won the Sobeys Classic on the World Curling Tour. Hughes would win her first provincial championship in 2016 when the team defeated Kim Dolan 5–4 in the final of the 2016 Prince Edward Island Scotties Tournament of Hearts They represented PEI at the 2016 Scotties Tournament of Hearts where they went 4–7. Birt stepped away from competitive curling after the season and Green (now MacPhee) moved back to the skip position. They won the Royal LePage OVCA Women's Fall Classic and finished runner-up at the Lady Monctonian Invitational Spiel once again. Hughes was able to defend her title as the provincial champion as well, defeating Veronica Smith in the semifinal of the 2017 Prince Edward Island Scotties Tournament of Hearts. They finished 3–8 at the 2017 Scotties Tournament of Hearts. Team MacPhee also won the provincial championship the following season, and finished 2–6 at the 2018 Scotties Tournament of Hearts. Birt returned to competitive curling after the season and took over the team as skip once again.

Team Birt had a very strong 2018–19 season, not missing the playoffs in any of their tour events. They won the WFG Jim Sullivan Curling Classic, finished runner-up at the Tim Hortons Spitfire Arms Cash Spiel and had semifinal finishes at both the Stu Sells Oakville Tankard and the New Scotland Clothing Ladies Cashspiel. The team won five straight sudden-death elimination games at the 2019 Prince Edward Island Scotties Tournament of Hearts to claim the provincial title. The team did improve their record at the 2019 Scotties Tournament of Hearts, finishing in sixth place with a 6–5 record.

Team Birt played in nine tour events the following season and qualified in eight of them, only missing the playoffs at the 2019 AMJ Campbell Shorty Jenkins Classic. This year, they won the Tim Hortons Spitfire Arms Cash Spiel and were finalists at the Atlantic Superstore Monctonian Challenge and the Jim Sullivan Curling Classic. They had semifinal finishes at The Curling Store Cashspiel, the New Scotland Clothing Ladies Cashspiel and the Dave Jones Stanhope Simpson Insurance Mayflower Cashspiel and a quarterfinal appearance at both the Stu Sells Oakville Tankard and the Tour Challenge Tier 2. They defended their title at the 2020 Prince Edward Island Scotties Tournament of Hearts. The team had an eighth-place finish at the 2020 Scotties Tournament of Hearts, finishing with a 5–6 record.

Team Birt began the 2020–21 season with two runner-up finishes at the 2020 The Curling Store Cashspiel and the 2020 Dave Jones Stanhope Simpson Insurance Mayflower Cashspiel. Due to the COVID-19 pandemic in Prince Edward Island, many teams had to opt out of the 2021 Prince Edward Island Scotties Tournament of Hearts as they could not commit to the quarantine process in order to compete in the 2021 Scotties Tournament of Hearts. This meant that only Team Birt and their clubmates Darlene London's rink entered the event. In the best-of-five series, Team Birt defeated Team London three games to zero to earn the right to represent Prince Edward Island at the 2021 Scotties in Calgary, Alberta. At the Tournament of Hearts, they finished a 4–4 round robin record, failing to qualify for the championship round.

The Birt rink had two appearances in finals to begin the 2021–22 season. The team lost in the final of the 2021 Oakville Fall Classic to Team Jamie Sinclair and the final of the 2021 Oakville Labour Day Classic to Team Tracy Fleury. Due to the COVID-19 pandemic in Canada, the qualification process for the 2021 Canadian Olympic Curling Trials had to be modified to qualify enough teams for the championship. In these modifications, Curling Canada created the 2021 Canadian Curling Trials Direct-Entry Event, an event where five teams would compete to try to earn one of three spots into the 2021 Canadian Olympic Curling Trials. Team Birt qualified for the Trials Direct-Entry Event due to their CTRS ranking from the 2019–20 season. The team went 1–3 through the round robin, finishing in last place and not advancing directly to the Trials. Team Birt had one final chance to advance to the Olympic Trials through the 2021 Canadian Olympic Curling Pre-Trials where they finished the round robin with a 4–2 record. This qualified them for the double knockout round, where they lost both of their games and were eliminated. The team had two more tour stops during the season, which included winning the Stu Sells 1824 Halifax Classic and reaching the semifinal of the Tim Hortons Spitfire Arms Cash Spiel. The 2022 Prince Edward Island Scotties Tournament of Hearts was cancelled due to the pandemic and Team Birt were selected to represent their province at the national women's championship. The team finished the 2022 Scotties Tournament of Hearts with a 4–4 record, fifth place in their pool.

In advance of the 2022–23 season, Team Birt won a fan vote which qualified them for the 2022 PointsBet Invitational. They lost their opening round game to the Rachel Homan rink. On tour, the team won two events. In October, they won the Superstore Monctonian Challenge with spares Colleen Jones and Sinead Dolan filling in for Marie Christianson and Michelle Shea. They then won the Jim Sullivan Curling Classic in November, going undefeated in the event. They also had a semifinal appearance at the New Scotland Clothing Women's Cashspiel. During the season, Christianson took over skipping duties on the team with Birt continuing to throw fourth stones. In the new year, they easily won the 2023 Prince Edward Island Scotties Tournament of Hearts, winning all three qualifying events. At the 2023 Scotties Tournament of Hearts in Kamloops, the team struggled, finishing seventh in their pool with a 2–6 record. After the season, the team announced they would be disbanding with Hughes stating she was retiring.

== Personal life ==
Hughes is a partner at the Charlottetown law firm, Cox & Palmer. She is married to Ryan Giddens and has two children, Carmen and Ross.

== Teams ==
Season	Skip	Third	Second	Lead
2002–03	Meaghan Hughes	Michelle Mackie	Sinead Dolan	Michala Robinson
2003–04	Meaghan Hughes	Sinead Dolan	Michala Robison	Erika Nabuurs
2004–05	Meaghan Hughes	Kendra Cameron	Sinead Dolan	Michala Robison
2005–06	Meaghan Hughes	Sinead Dolan	Michala Robison	Erika Nabuurs
2006–07	Meaghan Hughes	Sinead Dolan	Michala Robison	Erika Nabuurs
2011–12	Meaghan Hughes	Stefanie Clark	Jackie Reid	Tricia Affleck
2012–13	Meaghan Hughes (Fourth)	Kathy O'Rourke (Skip)	Jackie Reid	Tricia Affleck
2013–14	Robyn Green (Fourth)	Meaghan Hughes	Kathy O'Rourke (Skip)	Tricia Affleck
2014–15	Robyn Green (Fourth)	Meaghan Hughes	Kathy O'Rourke (Skip)	Tricia Affleck
2015–16	Suzanne Birt	Robyn MacPhee	Meaghan Hughes	Marie Christianson
2016–17	Robyn MacPhee	Sarah Fullerton	Meaghan Hughes	Michelle McQuaid
2017–18	Robyn MacPhee	Sarah Fullerton	Meaghan Hughes	Michelle McQuaid
2018–19	Suzanne Birt	Marie Christianson	Meaghan Hughes	Michelle McQuaid
2019–20	Suzanne Birt	Marie Christianson	Meaghan Hughes	Michelle McQuaid
2020–21	Suzanne Birt	Marie Christianson	Meaghan Hughes	Michelle McQuaid
2021–22	Suzanne Birt	Marie Christianson	Meaghan Hughes	Michelle McQuaid
2022–23	Suzanne Birt (Fourth)	Marie Christianson (Skip)	Michelle Shea	Meaghan Hughes
2026–27	Suzanne Birt	Michelle Shea	Meaghan Hughes	Sinead Dolan
