= 2026 PEI Women's Curling Championship =

Canadian provincial women's curling championship

- Host city: Montague, Prince Edward Island
- Arena: Montague Curling Club
- Dates: January 2–5
- Winner: Team Power
- Curling club: Summerside CC, Summerside
- Skip: Amanda Power
- Third: Veronica Mayne
- Second: Emily Best
- Lead: Sabrina Smith
- Coach: Peter Gallant
- Finalist: Hillary Selkirk

The 2026 PEI Women's Curling Championship, the women's provincial curling championship for Prince Edward Island, was held from January 2 to 5 at the Montague Curling Club in Montague, Prince Edward Island. The winning Amanda Power rink will represent Prince Edward Island at the 2026 Scotties Tournament of Hearts in Mississauga, Ontario. The event was held in conjunction with the 2026 PEI Men's Curling Championship, the provincial men's championship.

== Teams ==
The teams are listed as follows:

Skip	Third	Second	Lead	Alternate	Coach	Club
Shaelyn Forestell	Lauren Ferguson	Breanne Burgoyne	Alison Griffin-Waddell			Cornwall CC, Cornwall
Melissa Morrow	Darcee Birch	Kacey Gauthier	Michelle MacIntyre		Pat Quilty	Cornwall CC, Cornwall; Crapaud Community CC, Crapaud
Amanda Power	Veronica Mayne	Emily Best	Sabrina Smith		Peter Gallant	Summerside CC, Summerside
Hillary Selkirk	Joelle Trawick	Chloe McGuirk	Stef Clark	Michelle Shea		Montague CC, Montague
Jenny White	Lauren MacFadyen	Sam Crook	Emily VanIderstine			Summerside CC, Summerside

== Knockout Brackets ==
=== A Event ===
First Knockout	A Qualifier
Amanda Power	9
Jenny White	3
Jenny White	10
Melissa Morrow	9
Amanda Power	7
Hillary Selkirk	9
Shaelyn Forestell	3
Hillary Selkirk	9

=== B Event ===
Second Knockout	B Qualifier
Hillary Selkirk	6
Amanda Power	8	Amanda Power	7
Jenny White	2	Shaelyn Forestell	6
Melissa Morrow	2	Shaelyn Forestell	9
Shaelyn Forestell	9

=== C Event ===
Third Knockout	C Qualifier
Amanda Power	8
Hillary Selkirk	9	Hillary Selkirk	5
Shaelyn Forestell	8	Shaelynn Forestell	4
Melissa Morrow	11	Melissa Morrow	6
Jenny White	4

== Knockout Results ==
All draw times are listed in Atlantic Time (UTC−04:00).

=== Draw 2 ===
Friday, January 2, 2:00 pm

Sheet A	1	2	3	4	5	6	7	8	9	10	Final
Jenny White	0	0	1	0	3	0	1	3	0	2	10
Melissa Morrow	1	3	0	1	0	2	0	0	2	0	9

Sheet B	1	2	3	4	5	6	7	8	9	10	Final
Shaelyn Forestell	0	0	1	1	0	1	0	X	X	X	3
Hillary Selkirk	1	2	0	0	3	0	3	X	X	X	9

=== Draw 3 ===
Friday, January 2, 7:00 pm

Sheet B	1	2	3	4	5	6	7	8	9	10	Final
Amanda Power	0	1	0	1	3	0	1	3	X	X	9
Jenny White	1	0	1	0	0	1	0	0	X	X	3

Sheet D	1	2	3	4	5	6	7	8	9	10	Final
Melissa Morrow	0	1	0	0	1	0	0	X	X	X	2
Shaelyn Forestell	1	0	1	3	0	2	2	X	X	X	9

=== Draw 4 ===
Saturday, January 3, 9:00 am

Sheet A	1	2	3	4	5	6	7	8	9	10	Final
Jenny White	0	0	1	0	1	0	0	X	X	X	2
Shaelyn Forestell	3	1	0	3	0	1	1	X	X	X	9

=== Draw 5 ===
Saturday, January 3, 2:00 pm

Sheet C	1	2	3	4	5	6	7	8	9	10	11	Final
Amanda Power	2	0	0	0	2	0	0	0	3	0	0	7
Hillary Selkirk	0	3	0	0	0	0	1	1	0	2	2	9

=== Draw 6 ===
Saturday, January 3, 7:00 pm

Sheet B	1	2	3	4	5	6	7	8	9	10	Final
Amanda Power	0	0	1	0	2	0	4	0	0	1	8
Shaelyn Forestell	0	1	0	2	0	1	0	1	1	0	6

Sheet C	1	2	3	4	5	6	7	8	9	10	Final
Melissa Morrow	1	0	1	2	0	2	2	0	3	X	11
Jenny White	0	1	0	0	2	0	0	1	0	X	4

=== Draw 8 ===
Sunday, January 4, 2:00 pm

Sheet B	1	2	3	4	5	6	7	8	9	10	Final
Hillary Selkirk	0	0	2	0	1	0	2	1	0	0	6
Amanda Power	0	0	0	3	0	2	0	0	0	2	7

Sheet D	1	2	3	4	5	6	7	8	9	10	Final
Shaelyn Forestell	1	0	0	2	0	1	0	2	0	2	8
Melissa Morrow	0	2	1	0	1	0	1	0	1	0	6

=== Draw 9 ===
Sunday, January 4, 7:00 pm

Sheet D	1	2	3	4	5	6	7	8	9	10	Final
Hillary Selkirk	3	1	0	2	2	0	0	0	1	X	9
Shaelyn Forestell	0	0	1	0	0	1	1	1	0	X	4

=== Draw 11 ===
Monday, January 5, 2:00 pm

Sheet C	1	2	3	4	5	6	7	8	9	10	Final
Amanda Power	1	1	0	2	0	1	1	0	1	1	8
Hillary Selkirk	0	0	2	0	2	0	0	1	0	0	5

== Playoffs ==
- Team Amanda Power needed to be beaten twice as they won both the B and C events.

Semifinal			Final
			B	Amanda Power
A	Hillary Selkirk	5	C	Amanda Power
C	Amanda Power	7

=== Semifinal ===
Monday, January 5, 7:00 pm

Sheet B	1	2	3	4	5	6	7	8	9	10	Final
Hillary Selkirk	0	2	0	1	0	0	0	1	0	1	5
Amanda Power	1	0	1	0	1	2	1	0	1	0	7

2026 PEI Women's Curling Championship

Amanda Power
1st Prince Edward Island Provincial Championship title
