= Kate Robertson =

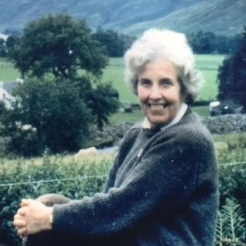
- Born: Kate Cameron; 21 October 1921; Glasgow
- Died: 11 August 2016 (aged 94); Oban
- Other name: "Kwacha Kate"
- Occupation: Physician
- Known for: serving for 30 years in Malawi
- Political party: Malawi Congress Party
- Spouse: Lindesay Robertson

Kate Robertson OBE or Kwacha Kate (21 October 1921 – 11 August 2016) was a Scottish missionary doctor turned Malawian politician.

== Life ==
Robertson was born in 1921 in Glasgow. Her father Angus Cameron was a doctor to a poor area in the city.

In 1952 she began to treat the ankle of a New Zealand-born soldier in the Royal Engineers. The treatment took two years but their marriage lasted longer. They married in 1954 and in 1959 they left together to work in Malawi with their two children. They were employed at the Mulanje Mission.

She made her reputation and the nickname of Kwacha Kate when she joined the Malawi Congress Party and stood for election with independence as part of her manifesto in 1961. Kwacha is the word for "Dawn" and it was the symbol used on the national flag and the name of the new currency. Her support for the country's independence was not appreciated by many in the British ex-pat community. In 1971 her husband became an MBE.

They were credited with leading the local community to organise the construction of a system of water collection and delivery that affected of the lives of two million people. One American report considered the level of co-operation to be unprecedented.

In 1986 she was back in the UK when she was awarded an OBE. She became devoted to Bragleenmore on Loch Scammadale which was a Clan Campbell home inherited by her husband's family.

Her husband died in 2009 after years of dementia. Robertson died in 2016 in Oban.
