= Veronica Smith =

American fencer

Personal information
- Born: 9 July 1942 (age 84) Budapest, Hungary

Sport
- Sport: Fencing

Veronica Smith (born 9 July 1942) is an American former fencer. She competed in the women's individual and team foil events at the 1968 Summer Olympics.
