= Susan McInnis =

Canadian curler

- Curler
- Born: June 18, 1963 (age 63); Charlottetown, Prince Edward Island

Curling career
- Hearts: 9 (1989, 1992, 1995, 1996, 1998, 2003, 2004, 2006, 2015)
Medal record
Women's curling
Scott Tournament of Hearts
Bronze medal – third place	2003 Kitchener

Susan McInnis (born June 18, 1963, in Charlottetown, Prince Edward Island) is a Canadian curler. She is currently the alternate for the Shelly Bradley rink.

== Curling career ==
McInnis has competed in nine Scotties Tournament of Hearts. Her first Scotties was in 1989, throwing third stones for the Kathie Gallant rink. There, the team finished with a 4–7 record. McInnis then played in the 1992 Scott Tournament of Hearts playing third for Kim Dolan, also finishing with a 4–7 record. McInnis returned to the Hearts in 1995 as part of the Rebecca Jean MacPhee (MacDonald) team. Originally supposed to be the alternate for the team, she ended up playing in nine games as the team's lead. The team made the playoffs after finishing fourth in the round robin with an 8–3 record. They lost in their first playoff match against Alberta's Cathy Borst's team. McInnis played lead in the game and curled 80%.

McInnis was back in 1996 as a skip and led her PEI rink, which included Kathy O'Rourke, Tricia MacGregor (Affleck) and Leslie Allan (MacDougall), to a 6–5 record. McInnis then joined the Tammi Lowther rink at third, and played in the 1998 Scott Tournament of Hearts, finishing with a 4–7 record.

McInnis did not return to the Hearts until 2003, throwing lead stones for Suzanne Gaudet (now Birt), who was fresh from winning two Canadian Junior championships. This team finished the round robin in first place, with a 10–1 record. However, they buckled under pressure in the playoffs, losing to the defending champion Colleen Jones rink in the 1 vs. 2 game, and then to Newfoundland and Labrador's Cathy Cunningham in the semi-final. In both games, McInnis led all curlers with a 94% shooting percentage. McInnis was promoted to third the next season, and returned to the Scotties in 2004. The team had a disappointing record, winning only two games. The team returned in 2006, improving to a 4–7 record.

After a break from competitive curling, McInnis re-joined the Suzanne Birt rink in 2013. They won the Prince Edward Island Scotties Tournament of Hearts in 2015, and McInnis played lead for PEI at the 2015 Scotties Tournament of Hearts.

McInnis has won several provincial mixed titles, in 1991, 1992, 1993, 1996, 1999 and 2001, all playing third for John Likely.
