= Sarah Fullerton =

Canadian curler

- Curler
- Born: March 8, 1991 (age 35); Charlottetown, Prince Edward Island

Team
- Curling club: Charlottetown CC, Charlottetown, PEI
- Skip: Sarah Fullerton
- Third: Amanda Colter
- Second: Anita Casey
- Lead: Aleya Quilty

Curling career
- Member Association: Prince Edward Island
- Hearts: 3 (2013, 2017, 2018)

Sarah Fullerton (born March 8, 1991) is a Canadian curler from Cornwall, Prince Edward Island.

== Career ==
=== Junior career ===
Sarah Fullerton has been a rising star on the curling scene in Prince Edward Island. In 2003, she captured the P.E.I 11 and under title. She would also win the 15 and under title in 2006, and between 2006 and 2009 she would capture the 17 and under title three times.

In 2010, Fullerton represented Prince Edward Island at the 2010 Canadian Junior Curling Championships, where her team would finish with a 6–6 record. She would return in 2011 and finish with a 7–5 record. In her final year of junior play Fullerton and her team would once again, qualify to represent Prince Edward Island at the 2012 Canadian Junior Curling Championships.

=== 2012-current ===
Fullerton and her team entered their first year of women's play at the 2012 Prince Edward Island Scotties Tournament of Hearts. She finished round robin play with a 4–1 record and clinch second place. In the semi-final she played Kim Dolan. Starting off quite comfortably, Fullerton was up 6-1 after end 4, however after giving up four stolen points in ends 8 and 9, she tied the game in 10. After some troubles in the extra end, without hammer, Fullerton lost the semi-final to Kim Dolan 9-10.

For the 2012/2013 season, Fullerton joined Suzanne Birt and her team out of the Charlottetown Curling Club. A place on the team became available, when Birt's second Robyn MacPhee, decided to take time off to focus on other activities and to plan her upcoming wedding.

== Personal life ==
Fullerton's father, Glen (Barney) is the mayor of Cornwall, Prince Edward Island. She works as an occupational therapist for Health PEI.
