= Stefanie Clark =

Canadian curler

- Curler
- Born: November 10, 1980 (age 46); Charlottetown, Prince Edward Island

Team
- Curling club: Charlottetown CC, Charlottetown, PEI

Curling career
- Hearts: 4 (2005, 2007, 2008, 2013)
- Top CTRS ranking: N/A
- Grand Slam victories: 0
Medal record
Curling
World Junior Championships
Gold medal – first place	2001
Canada Games
Silver medal – second place	1995 Grande Prairie

Stefanie Clark (born November 10, 1980, as Stefanie Richard) is a Canadian curler.

Clark was a member of Gaudet's junior team which represented Prince Edward Island from 1998 to 2001 (1998, 1999, 2000, 2001) inclusively at the Canadian Junior Curling Championships. Clark played third for the team. In 2001, the team won the Junior Championships and went on to win the gold medal at the World Junior Curling Championships as well.

After juniors, Clark played lead for Rebecca Jean MacPhee. In 2006, she was reunited with Gaudet and the rest of their junior team, and they went on to win the provincial championships in 2007. In 2008, she won the Marj Mitchell Sportsmanship Award.

For the 2011/2012 season Clark joined up with four time PEI junior champion Meaghan Hughes. Tricia Affleck and Jackie Reid round up the team respectively at lead and second.
