= Leslie MacDougall =

Canadian curler

- Curler
- Born: April 29, 1970 (age 56); Lachine, Quebec

Team
- Curling club: Charlottetown CC, Charlottetown, PEI

Curling career
- Hearts: 6 (1993, 1996, 2000, 2001, 2011, 2013)
- Grand Slam victories: 0

Leslie MacDougall (born Leslie Allan, April 29, 1970 in Lachine, Quebec) is a Canadian curler from Cornwall, Prince Edward Island.

== Curling career ==
=== 1993–2001 ===
MacDougall made her first appearance on the National scene in 1993, as an alternate for Angela Roberts. The team would finish round robin play with a 5–6 record. She would return to the Scott again in 1996, this time playing lead for Susan McInnis. Along with Kathy O'Rourke at third and Tricia MacGregor at second, the team would finish round robin 6–5. MacDougal would not return to the Scott until 2000 this time playing second for Shelly Bradley. With Janice MacCallum at third and Tricia MacGregor at lead, the team would finish round robin with a 3–8 record. Winning a second straight provincial title with Bradley, the team would once again represent PEI at the 2001 Scott Tournament of Hearts finishing round robin with a 7–4 record. This was enough to take the team into a tiebreaker, however they would lose 2–9 to Ontario's Sherry Middaugh.

=== 2008–current ===
At the beginning of the 2008/2009 curling season, MacDougall along with former teammate Shelly Bradley, would join forces with Suzanne Birt. They would not find success as a team until 2011, when they won the 2011 Prince Edward Island Scotties Tournament of Hearts. This would be the first trip back to the Scotties for MacDougall in ten years, and there was a lot riding on this win for the team. They would represent PEI at home, in Charlottetown, at the 2011 Scotties Tournament of Hearts. They would also be following a stellar performance from Kathy O'Rourke’s team who went to the final of the 2010 Scotties Tournament of Hearts. Unfortunately the team would finish round robin with a 6–5 record.

== Personal life ==
MacDougall is married to Mark MacDougall and has two children, Molly and Christopher.
