= Rebecca Jean MacDonald =

Canadian curler

- Curler
- Born: Rebecca Jean MacPhee; March 25, 1974 (age 52); Charlottetown, Prince Edward Island, Canada

Team
- Curling club: Charlottetown CC, Charlottetown, PEI

Curling career
- Hearts: 9 (1995, 1997, 1999, 2003, 2005, 2009, 2012, 2014, 2017)
- World Mixed Doubles Championship: 1 (2011)
- Grand Slam victories: 0
Medal record
Curling
Representing Prince Edward Island
Scotties Tournament of Hearts
Bronze medal – third place	2003 Kitchener

Rebecca Jean MacDonald (born Rebecca Jean MacPhee on March 25, 1974, in Charlottetown, Prince Edward Island) is a Canadian curler from Stratford, Prince Edward Island.

== Career ==
=== Juniors ===
MacDonald made her first appearance on the curling scene as a skip at the 1991 Canadian Junior Curling Championships, when she would win the Prince Edward Island Junior Curling Championship. She would not find success at the National level, only finishing round robin with a 4–7 record. She would win the provincial championship again in 1992. This time her team would finish round robin with a 7–4 record at the 1992 Canadian Juniors, which was enough to secure a tiebreaker. Her team would lose the tiebreaker to Ontario.

=== 1995–1999 ===
MacDonald would find herself on the national scene again in 1995. She would represent Prince Edward Island at the 1995 Scott Tournament of Hearts. Along with veteran skip Kim Dolan at third, the team would find success finishing fourth in round robin with an 8–3 record. They would eventually lose the 3-4 page playoff game to Alberta's Cathy Borst. MacDonald would return to the Scott two more times in the 1990s once in 1997 where the team finished with a 5–6 record, and again in 1999, where they would finish with a 6–5 record.

=== 2003–2009 ===
MacDonald would join up with world junior champion Suzanne Gaudet, as her third, as well as with her sister Robyn MacPhee, who was playing second. The team would defeat Kathy O'Rourke in the Provincials playdowns and would represent Prince Edward Island at the 2003 Scott Tournament of Hearts. They would find great success, finishing 10–1 in round robin play, enough to secure first place. They would lose the 1-2 page playoff game to team Canada's Colleen Jones, and would have a chance to move forward in the semi-final. The team however would lose 5–6 to Newfoundland's Cathy Cunningham, finishing in third place.

In 2004 after a falling out with Gaudet, MacDonald and her sister would leave to form their own team. They would advance to the semi-final of the provincial playdowns, but would lose to Gaudet. In 2005 modifying their line up, adding Shelly Bradley to third, MacDonald would go undefeated in the provincials to win and advance to the 2005 Scott Tournament of Hearts. They would only finish with a 4–7 record.

MacDonald's team would once again change in 2006, her sister, Robyn MacPhee, would take a year off from curling, while Shelly Bradley would form her own team. MacDonald would join Kathy O'Rourke, as her third, but would be unsuccessful winning provincials in 2006, 2007 and 2008. In 2009, after playing with Gaudet for the 2007 and 2008 seasons, Robyn MacPhee, would rejoin MacDonald, this time throwing fourth stones, while MacDonald threw third, and called the game. They would win the provincial title, and advance to the 2009 Scotties Tournament of Hearts. They would finish in a tie for fourth place and face team Canada's Jennifer Jones, where they would lose the tiebreaker giving up a steal of 1 in the extra end.

=== 2010–current ===
MacDonald would add Kim Dolan to her team in 2010, but would fail to qualify in the provincials. In 2011 MacDonald's sister would once again leave the team to play with Suzanne Birt. Dolan would take over as skip, while MacDonald would move to third. Once again the team would fail to qualify in the provincials.

In 2010, MacDonald playing third for Robert Campbell (skip), Robbie Doherty (second) and Jackie Reid (lead), would win the Prince Edward Island provincial mixed championship. The team advance to the 2011 Canadian Mixed Curling Championship, where they would finish with a 10–1 record, and advance to the final. They would play Manitoba in the final, where they would win the Canadian Mixed Championship. MacDonald and Campbell would advance to the 2011 World Mixed Doubles Curling Championship where they would finish with a 4–3 record, failing to qualify for the playoffs.

At the 2012 Prince Edward Island Scotties Tournament of Hearts, MacDonald, along with Dolan, would win the provincial championship. She would defeat defending campion Suzanne Birt in round robin, three time junior champion Sarah Fullerton in the semi-final and four time junior champion Meaghan Hughes in the final. MacDonald and team would finish round robin with a 3–8 record at the 2012 Scotties Tournament of Hearts. Dolan and lead Nancy Cameron, both announced their retirement from the game, leaving MacDonald looking for a new team. Although her sister Robyn as decided to take a year off from curling, MacDonald noted she really enjoys playing with her and would like to do so again in the future.

MacDonald would win her second Prince Edward Island provincial mixed championship in March 2012. Playing third for Robert Campbell (skip), along with Robbie Doherty (second) and Jackie Reid (lead), the team would win their second provincial in two years and will compete at the 2013 Canadian Mixed Curling Championship.

== Personal life ==
MacDonald was married in the summer of 2010. She has one child. She works as a pediatric nurse at Queen Elizabeth Hospital.
