= Kim Dolan =

Canadian curler

- Curler
- Born: April 12, 1958 (age 68); Charlottetown, Prince Edward Island

Team
- Curling club: Charlottetown CC, Charlottetown, PEI

Curling career
- Hearts: 13 (1983, 1985, 1987, 1990, 1992, 1995, 1997, 1999, 2002, 2005, 2008, 2012, 2014)
- Grand Slam victories: 0

Kim Dolan (born Kim McLeod, April 12, 1958, in Charlottetown, Prince Edward Island) is a Canadian curler.

== Career ==
=== 1983–1999 ===
Kim Dolan first made a national appearance on the curling scene in 1983. She won her first provincial championship and represented Prince Edward Island at the 1983 Scott Tournament of Hearts. Her team won four games and finished with a 4–6 round robin record. She returned in 1985 where she finished with the same 4–6 record. In 1987 Dolan made her third appearance at the Scott; however, this time she finished with a 1–10 record. A fourth Scott appearance for Dolan came in 1990. Her team performed better this time around, finishing with a 4–7 record. Returning to the Scott again in 1992, Dolan and team finished round robin with a 4–7 record.

Dolan once again returned to the Scott in 1995; this time she played third for Rebecca Jean MacPhee. This new team found success, and for the first time, Dolan made it to the playoffs at the Scott. The team finished fourth in round robin with an 8–3 record. The team lost the 3-4 game to Alberta’s Cathy Borst. At the 1997 Scott Tournament of Hearts, playing third for MacPhee, the team finished round robin with a 5-6 record, failing to regain a playoff spot. Dolan’s next appearance at the Scott came in 1999, playing third for MacPhee. The team finished with a 6–5 record and failed to reach the playoffs.

=== 2000–current ===
In 2002, Dolan was asked to play fifth for Kathy O'Rourke, who would represent Prince Edward Island at the Scott. This was the first time Dolan made a trip to the Scott without qualifying. O'Rourke’s squad would finish 3-8 in round robin play.

In 2004, Dolan won the Provincial Mixed Curling Championships. She finished round robin of the 2005 Canadian Mixed Curling Championships with a 3-8 record.

In 2005, Dolan, now playing third for O'Rourke, failed to qualify at the provincial level. She was asked by Rebecca Jean MacPhee, who won the 2005 Prince Edward Island Scott Tournament of Hearts, to accompany the team as their fifth. MacPhee’s team finished round robin with a 4-7 record.

In 2008, Dolan would make a different appearance at the Scotties. She was asked by Suzanne Gaudet to not only be the fifth, but also accompany the team to the Nationals as their coach. The team would finish round robin with a 3-8 record.

At the 2012 Prince Edward Island Scotties Tournament of Hearts, Dolan would win her first provincial championship in 13 years, bringing the total number of provincial championships nine. She would defeat defending campion Suzanne Birt in round robin, three time junior champion Sarah Fullerton in the semi-final and four time junior champion Meaghan Hughes in the final. This was also a historic win for Dolan, as for the first time in Prince Edward Island women’s play, a mother and daughter, (Sinead Dolan), would win a championship together. Dolan would play in her final Scotties, at the 2012 Scotties Tournament of Hearts, where she would finish round robin with a 3-8 record. Her final game in Draw 16, would mark Dolan's 100th game at the Scotties. She would defeat New Brunswick's Rebecca Atkinson 11-4.
