= Tricia MacGregor =

Canadian curler

- Curler
- Born: September 25, 1970 (age 56); Charlottetown, Prince Edward Island

Team
- Curling club: Charlottetown CC, Charlottetown, PEI
- Skip: Shelly Bradley
- Third: Veronica Smith
- Second: Jane DiCarlo
- Lead: Tricia MacGregor
- Alternate: Susan McInnis

Curling career
- Hearts: 7 (1996, 2000, 2001, 2004, 2006, 2010, 2011)
- Top CTRS ranking: N/A
- Grand Slam victories: 0
Medal record
Curling
Scotties Tournament of Hearts
Silver medal – second place	2010 Sault Ste. Marie

Tricia MacGregor, known as Tricia Affleck from 2003 to 2015, (born September 25, 1970, in Charlottetown, Prince Edward Island) is a Canadian curler. She currently plays lead for the Shelly Bradley rink out of the Charlottetown Curling Complex in Charlottetown. MacGregor has represented P.E.I. as a provincial junior champion in 1989 and 1990, at the Scotties Tournament of Hearts and as a provincial mixed champion in 2008 and 2010. MacGregor's first Scotties appearance was in 1996 playing second for Susan McInnis. The team finished just short of the playoffs at 6–5 losing a tiebreaker to team Canada's Connie Laliberte. MacGregor's best run was at the 2010 Scotties Tournament of Hearts finishing first place in the round robin to go on to the final winning silver. She returned to the Scotties in 2011 as an alternate for Suzanne Birt.

For the 2011–12 season, MacGregor threw lead stones for four time PEI junior champion Meaghan Hughes rink. The next season, the team added Kathy O'Rourke as skip (Hughes throwing last stones). The team stuck together under various lineups until 2015, when MacGregor joined the Shelly Bradley rink.

MacGregor has two children.
