= Robyn MacPhee =

Canadian curler

- Curler ♀
- Born: August 11, 1983 (age 43); Charlottetown, Prince Edward Island

Curling career
- Hearts: 9 (2003, 2005, 2007, 2008, 2009, 2011, 2016, 2017, 2018)
- Top CTRS ranking: 14th (2006-07)
- Grand Slam victories: 0
Medal record
Curling
Representing Canada
World Junior Championships
Gold medal – first place	2001 Ogden
Bronze medal – third place	2002 Kelowna
Representing Prince Edward Island
Scotties Tournament of Hearts
Bronze medal – third place	2003 Kitchener

Robyn MacPhee (born August 11, 1983, in Charlottetown, Prince Edward Island, also known as Robyn Green) is a Canadian curler.

== Curling career ==
MacPhee played for Prince Edward Island at the 1999 Canada Games, finishing 12th.

MacPhee played both second and third for Suzanne Birt (née Gaudet) during their junior careers. Playing second for the team, she won the 2001 Canadian Junior Curling Championships and a gold at the 2001 World Junior Curling Championships. At the 2002 Canadian Juniors, MacPhee played third for the team, and they won another Canadian Junior championship and a bronze at the World Junior Championships.

After juniors, MacPhee remained on Birt's team, and would play second once again. The team won the provincial women's title in 2003 and would lose in the semi-final at the 2003 Scott Tournament of Hearts.

MacPhee left Birt's team afterwards and joined up with her sister, Rebecca Jean MacDonald (née MacPhee) as her second. With her sister, she would win another provincial title in 2005 but finished out of the playoffs at the 2005 Scott Tournament of Hearts. In 2006, she was reunited with Birt and the successful junior team they had. MacPhee won her third provincial championship in 2007, this time as Birt's third.

In 2008, she left Birt's team to once again play with her sister, except now in the position of skip. The new lineup was successful and MacPhee along with her sister, Shelley Muzika and Tammi Lowther, would win the PEI provincials, representing the province at the 2009 Scotties Tournament of Hearts. During the National competition would finish in a tie-breaker, with a 7–4 record. They would face Team Canada Jennifer Jones, taking an early lead up 4-2 during the 5th end break. They would maintain the lead forcing Canada to take 1 in the 9th. With hammer coming home, MacPhee would miss her final shot giving up a steal of one, taking them to an extra end. With the hammer once again in 11, facing an identical final shot as in the 10th end, MacPhee would once again miss her final shot, giving Canada a second stolen point and the win.

In 2010, MacPhee would leave her sister's team, and once again join up with Suzanne Birt.

On February 3, 2012, it was announced that MacPhee would leave the Birt team at the end of the season, taking a year off to pursue other activities.

== Personal life ==
MacPhee is employed as a virology technologist at the Atlantic Veterinary College at the University of Prince Edward Island.
