= Kathy O'Rourke =

Canadian curler

Kathleen O'Rourke
- Curler
- Born: April 30, 1964 (age 62); Summerside, Prince Edward Island, Canada

Team
- Curling club: Charlottetown CC, Charlottetown, PEI
- Skip: Suzanne Birt
- Third: Marie Christianson
- Second: Meaghan Hughes
- Lead: Michelle McQuaid
- Alternate: Kathy O'Rourke

Curling career
- Member Association: Prince Edward Island
- Hearts: 8 (1989, 1991, 1996, 1999, 2002, 2010, 2021, 2022)
- Other appearances: Canadian Mixed (1989, 1999)
Medal record
Women's curling
Scotties Tournament of Hearts
Silver medal – second place	2010 Sault Ste. Marie

Kathleen O'Rourke (born April 30, 1964) is a Canadian curler from Cumberland, Prince Edward Island. She is a six-time provincial champion and is a former Canadian Mixed Champion.

== Career ==
O'Rourke played in her first national women's championship in 1989, playing second for Kathie Gallant. The team finished 4–7. In 1991, she made it again, playing second for Angela Roberts, finishing 2–9. She made her third trip in 1996, playing third for Susan McInnes, finishing 6–5. This qualified the team for a tie-breaker match, which they lost to the defending champion Connie Laliberte (Team Canada) rink. In 1999, she returned once again, playing third for Rebecca Jean MacPhee, finishing with a 6–5 record once again, but missing the playoffs. In 2002, she made her fifth national championship, her first as skip. She finished the round robin with a 3–8 record. She won her sixth provincial championship in 2010, throwing second stones and skipping for Erin Carmody, and later won a silver medal at the 2010 Scotties Tournament of Hearts.

In mixed curling, O'Rourke won the Canadian Mixed Curling Championship in 1989, playing lead for Robert Campbell. She played third at the 1999 Canadian Mixed, for Peter MacDonald, but did not win. She is married to Mark O'Rourke, her teammate in her 1989 Mixed Championship win.

At the end of the 2010–2011 season O'Rourke retired from competitive curling. Her decision was made when teammates Erin Carmody and Geri-Lynn Ramsay decided to move to Calgary, Carmody to further her University studies at U of Calgary and Ramsay to relocate alongside her boyfriend.

O'Rourke returned to curling in the 2012-2013 curling season, taking over the skip position of Meaghan Hughes' team. Hughes throws last rock, with O'Rourke skipping and throwing third stones. Jackie Reid and Tricia Affleck round off the team at second and lead.

== Personal life ==
O'Rourke is a retired managing partner at Grant Thornton PEI.

== Grand Slam record ==
Key
C	Champion
F	Lost in Final
SF	Lost in Semifinal
QF	Lost in Quarterfinals
R16	Lost in the round of 16
Q	Did not advance to playoffs
T2	Played in Tier 2 event
DNP	Did not participate in event
N/A	Not a Grand Slam event that season

=== Former events ===
Event	2010–11
Sobeys Slam	QF
