= Shelly Bradley =

Canadian curler (born 1970)

- Curler
- Born: November 17, 1970 (age 55); Dalhousie, New Brunswick

Curling career
- Member Association: Prince Edward Island
- Hearts: 10 (1994, 1999, 2000, 2001, 2005, 2006, 2010, 2011, 2013, 2015)
Medal record
Women's curling
Representing Prince Edward Island
Scotties Tournament of Hearts
| Silver medal – second place | 2010 Sault Ste. Marie |

Shelly Bradley (born Shelly Danks on November 17, 1970, in Dalhousie, New Brunswick) is a Canadian curler from Stratford, Prince Edward Island.

Bradley has represented Prince Edward Island at the Scotties Tournament of Hearts, Canada's national women's curling championships, 10 times to date. Her first appearance was at the 1994 Scott Tournament of Hearts, where she skipped her team to a 7-4 round robin finish, which was enough to qualify for a tiebreaker. She would lose the tiebreaker to Newfoundland's Laura Phillips. Bradley was an Alternate for Kathy O'Rourke at the 2010 Scotties Tournament of Hearts, where the team lost the final to Jennifer Jones. At the 2011 Scotties Tournament of Hearts in Charlottetown her team failed to reach the playoffs finishing 6–5 in round robin play.

Bradley is married and has two children.
