= 2007 PEI Labatt Tankard =

2007 Prince Edward Island Labatt Tankard
- Host city: Cornwall, Prince Edward Island
- Arena: Cornwall Curling Club
- Dates: February 6–11
- Men's winner: Peter Gallant
- Curling club: Charlottetown CC; Charlottetown
- Skip: Peter Gallant
- Third: Kevin Champion
- Second: Mark O'Rourke
- Lead: Robert Campbell
- Finalist: Rod MacDonald

The 2007 PEI Labatt Tankard, the men's curling provincial championships for Prince Edward Island, was held during late January and early February. The open playdowns were held at the Crapaud Community Curling Club from January 26–29, while the final eight playdowns were held at the Cornwall Curling Club from February 6–11. The winner of the Tankard was Peter Gallant, who won his first Tankard as a skip. He and his rink represented PEI at the 2007 Tim Hortons Brier in Hamilton, Ontario, where they finished tied for eighth place at 4–7.

== Open Playdowns ==
The open playdowns consisted of 21 teams playing in a triple-knockout format. The top eight teams advanced to the final round.

== Final round ==
=== Teams ===
Skip	Third	Second	Lead	Locale
Mel Bernard	Blair Jay	Bill Hope	Earle Proude	Silver Fox Curling and Yacht Club, Summerside
Kevin Ellsworth	Kevin Smith	Pat Aylward	Merle Chappell	Silver Fox Curling and Yacht Club, Summerside
Peter Gallant	Kevin Champion	Mark O'Rourke	Robert Campbell	Charlottetown Curling Club, Charlottetown
John Likely	Phillip Gorveatt	Mark Butler	Mike Dillon	Charlottetown Curling Club, Charlottetown
Rod MacDonald	Jamie Newsom	Mike Gaudet	Peter MacDonald	Silver Fox Curling and Yacht Club, Summerside
Andrew Robinson	Tyler MacKenzie	Tyler Harris	Mark Waugh	Charlottetown Curling Club, Charlottetown
Robert Shaw	Sandy MacPhee	Robbie Younker	Derryl McCarville	Charlottetown Curling Club, Charlottetown
Kyle Stevenson	Pat Lynch	Kyle MacDonald	Phillip McInnis	Charlottetown Curling Club, Charlottetown

=== Standings ===
Skip	W	L
Peter Gallant	7	0
John Likely	5	2
Rod MacDonald	5	2
Kyle Stevenson	4	3
Andrew Robinson	3	4
Mel Bernard	2	5
Robert Shaw	1	6
Kevin Ellsworth	1	6

=== Round-robin results ===
==== Draw 1 ====
Tuesday, February 6, 3:00 pm

Sheet 1	1	2	3	4	5	6	7	8	9	10	Final
Peter Gallant 🔨	1	0	0	2	0	0	2	3	X	X	8
Kyle Stevenson	0	0	2	0	1	0	0	0	X	X	3

Sheet 2	1	2	3	4	5	6	7	8	9	10	Final
John Likely 🔨	1	0	1	2	3	2	X	X	X	X	9
Robert Shaw	0	2	0	0	0	0	X	X	X	X	2

Sheet 3	1	2	3	4	5	6	7	8	9	10	Final
Rod MacDonald 🔨	1	2	0	1	0	1	1	0	3	X	9
Mel Bernard	0	0	1	0	2	0	0	1	0	X	4

Sheet 4	1	2	3	4	5	6	7	8	9	10	Final
Andrew Robinson 🔨	2	0	0	0	2	0	0	2	1	X	7
Kevin Ellsworth	0	0	0	1	0	1	1	0	0	X	3

==== Draw 2 ====
Wednesday, February 7, 2:00 pm

Sheet 1	1	2	3	4	5	6	7	8	9	10	Final
Mel Bernard 🔨	0	0	1	1	0	0	0	0	1	0	3
Kevin Ellsworth	0	0	0	0	1	0	1	0	0	3	5

Sheet 2	1	2	3	4	5	6	7	8	9	10	Final
Rod MacDonald 🔨	3	0	0	2	1	0	1	0	0	1	8
Andrew Robinson	0	1	0	0	0	1	0	2	1	0	5

Sheet 3	1	2	3	4	5	6	7	8	9	10	Final
Kyle Stevenson 🔨	1	3	0	2	0	3	X	X	X	X	9
Robert Shaw	0	0	1	0	1	0	X	X	X	X	2

Sheet 4	1	2	3	4	5	6	7	8	9	10	11	Final
John Likely 🔨	0	0	0	1	0	2	0	0	0	1	0	4
Peter Gallant	0	0	1	0	1	0	0	1	1	0	1	5

==== Draw 3 ====
Wednesday, February 7, 7:30 pm

Sheet 1	1	2	3	4	5	6	7	8	9	10	Final
Robert Shaw 🔨	0	1	0	1	0	1	2	0	X	X	5
Rod MacDonald	1	0	2	0	2	0	0	4	X	X	9

Sheet 2	1	2	3	4	5	6	7	8	9	10	Final
Kevin Ellsworth 🔨	1	0	0	1	0	0	0	1	0	X	3
Peter Gallant	0	1	1	0	1	0	0	0	4	X	7

Sheet 3	1	2	3	4	5	6	7	8	9	10	Final
Andrew Robinson 🔨	0	0	1	0	2	0	0	2	1	0	6
John Likely	0	0	0	2	0	4	1	0	0	1	8

Sheet 4	1	2	3	4	5	6	7	8	9	10	Final
Kyle Stevenson 🔨	1	0	2	0	2	1	0	1	0	X	7
Mel Bernard	0	2	0	1	0	0	0	0	1	X	4

==== Draw 4 ====
Thursday, February 8, 2:00 pm

Sheet 1	1	2	3	4	5	6	7	8	9	10	Final
John Likely 🔨	0	0	0	1	0	0	2	0	0	X	3
Mel Bernard	1	2	1	0	1	1	0	1	1	X	8

Sheet 2	1	2	3	4	5	6	7	8	9	10	Final
Andrew Robinson 🔨	1	0	0	1	0	0	2	0	1	X	5
Kyle Stevenson	0	0	3	0	2	1	0	1	0	X	7

Sheet 3	1	2	3	4	5	6	7	8	9	10	Final
Peter Gallant 🔨	0	1	0	2	0	1	0	4	X	X	8
Rod MacDonald	0	0	1	0	1	0	1	0	X	X	3

Sheet 4	1	2	3	4	5	6	7	8	9	10	Final
Robert Shaw 🔨	1	0	0	0	1	0	1	0	0	1	4
Kevin Ellsworth	0	1	0	0	0	1	0	0	0	0	2

==== Draw 5 ====
Thursday, February 8, 7:00 pm

Sheet 1	1	2	3	4	5	6	7	8	9	10	Final
Peter Gallant 🔨	0	2	0	2	0	0	4	0	1	X	9
Andrew Robinson	0	0	2	0	1	1	0	2	0	X	6

Sheet 2	1	2	3	4	5	6	7	8	9	10	Final
Mel Bernard 🔨	2	0	2	0	1	0	1	0	0	2	8
Robert Shaw	0	1	0	1	0	2	0	1	1	0	6

Sheet 3	1	2	3	4	5	6	7	8	9	10	Final
Kevin Ellsworth 🔨	1	0	0	1	0	0	2	0	0	0	4
John Likely	0	2	0	0	2	0	0	0	0	3	7

Sheet 4	1	2	3	4	5	6	7	8	9	10	Final
Rod MacDonald 🔨	2	0	0	2	0	2	1	0	0	1	8
Kyle Stevenson	0	0	2	0	2	0	0	2	0	0	6

==== Draw 6 ====
Friday, February 9, 2:00 pm

Sheet 1	1	2	3	4	5	6	7	8	9	10	Final
Kyle Stevenson 🔨	1	0	2	0	0	0	X	X	X	X	3
John Likely	0	3	0	1	2	3	X	X	X	X	9

Sheet 2	1	2	3	4	5	6	7	8	9	10	Final
Rod MacDonald 🔨	3	0	3	0	1	1	0	0	0	X	8
Kevin Ellsworth	0	2	0	1	0	0	1	1	1	X	6

Sheet 3	1	2	3	4	5	6	7	8	9	10	Final
Robert Shaw 🔨	1	0	2	0	0	1	0	1	0	X	5
Peter Gallant	0	3	0	0	2	0	1	0	1	X	7

Sheet 4	1	2	3	4	5	6	7	8	9	10	Final
Mel Bernard 🔨	0	2	0	0	0	0	1	0	1	0	4
Andrew Robinson	0	0	1	1	1	1	0	0	0	1	5

==== Draw 7 ====
Friday, February 9, 7:00 pm

Sheet 1	1	2	3	4	5	6	7	8	9	10	Final
Andrew Robinson 🔨	1	1	0	2	2	0	2	0	0	X	8
Robert Shaw	0	0	2	0	0	1	0	2	0	X	5

Sheet 2	1	2	3	4	5	6	7	8	9	10	Final
Peter Gallant 🔨	1	3	2	0	X	X	X	X	X	X	6
Mel Bernard	0	0	0	1	X	X	X	X	X	X	1

Sheet 3	1	2	3	4	5	6	7	8	9	10	Final
Kevin Ellsworth 🔨	0	0	0	0	2	1	0	2	0	X	5
Kyle Stevenson	0	0	1	2	0	0	2	0	3	X	8

Sheet 4	1	2	3	4	5	6	7	8	9	10	11	Final
John Likely 🔨	0	2	0	1	0	0	0	1	0	0	1	5
Rod MacDonald	0	0	0	0	0	0	1	0	2	1	0	4

=== Playoffs ===
Page playoff system
1	Peter Gallant	6
2	John Likely	3
3	Rod MacDonald	6
4	Kyle Stevenson	4

Semifinal
2	John Likely	8
3	Rod MacDonald	9

Gold Medal Game
1	Peter Gallant	8
3	Rod MacDonald	6

==== 1 vs. 2 ====
Saturday, February 10, 2:00 pm

Team	1	2	3	4	5	6	7	8	9	10	Final
Peter Gallant 🔨	0	0	0	0	2	0	0	4	0	X	6
John Likely	0	0	0	0	0	1	0	0	2	X	3

==== 3 vs. 4 ====
Saturday, February 10, 2:00 pm

Team	1	2	3	4	5	6	7	8	9	10	Final
Rod MacDonald 🔨	0	0	1	0	1	1	1	1	0	1	6
Kyle Stevenson	1	0	0	2	0	0	0	0	1	0	4

==== Semifinal ====
Saturday, February 10, 7:00 pm

Team	1	2	3	4	5	6	7	8	9	10	Final
Rod MacDonald	0	0	2	0	3	0	1	0	2	1	9
John Likely 🔨	0	1	0	1	0	3	0	3	0	0	8

==== Final ====
Sunday, February 11, 3:00 pm

Team	1	2	3	4	5	6	7	8	9	10	Final
Peter Gallant 🔨	1	0	0	2	0	2	0	2	0	1	8
Rod MacDonald	0	1	1	0	0	0	2	0	2	0	6
