= 2014 PEI Tankard =

- Host city: Montague, Prince Edward Island
- Arena: Montague Curling Rink
- Dates: February 5–9
- Winner: Eddie MacKenzie
- Curling club: Charlottetown Curling Complex, Charlottetown
- Skip: Eddie MacKenzie
- Third: Anson Carmody
- Second: Tyler MacKenzie
- Lead: Sean Ledgerwood
- Alternate: Phil Gorveatt
- Finalist: Jamie Newson

The 2014 PEI Tankard, the provincial men's curling championship for Prince Edward Island, was held from February 5 to 9 at the Montague Curling Rink in Montague, Prince Edward Island. The winning Eddie MacKenzie rink from Charlottetown represented Prince Edward Island at the 2014 Tim Hortons Brier in Kamloops.

== Teams ==
Skip	Third	Second	Lead	Alternate	Locale(s)
Robert Campbell	Erik Brodersen	Dennis Watts	Mike Dillion		Charlottetown Curling Complex, Charlottetown
Donald Clarey	Larry Richards	Rob Young	Mike Clarey		Montague Curling Rink, Montague
Tyler Harris	Sam Ramsay	Cody Dixon	John Mullin		Charlottetown Curling Complex, Charlottetown
Bill Hope	Craig Mackie	David Murphy	Doug MacGregor		Cornwall Curling Club, Cornwall
Blair Jay	Mark Butler	Robbie Doherty	Robbie Younker		Charlottetown Curling Complex, Charlottetown
Rod MacDonald	Kevin Champion	Mark O'Rourke	Mark Victor		Charlottetown Curling Complex, Charlottetown
Eddie MacKenzie	Anson Carmody	Tyler MacKenzie	Sean Ledgerwood	Phil Gorveatt	Charlottetown Curling Complex, Charlottetown
Jamie Newson	Andrew Robinson	Sean Clarey	John Desrosiers	Phillip McInnis	Charlottetown Curling Complex, Charlottetown
Kyle Stevenson	Pat Lynch	Kyle MacDonald	Jeff Gallant		Charlottetown Curling Complex, Charlottetown
Blair Weeks	Robert Shaw	Matthew Nabuurs	Connor MacPhee		Charlottetown Curling Complex, Charlottetown

== Knockout Draw Brackets ==
=== A Event ===
First Knockout
Bill Hope	3
Tyler Harris	7
Eddie MacKenzie	8
Kyle Stevenson	3

Quarterfinals
Donald Clarey	4
Jamie Newson	8
Blair Weeks	6
Tyler Harris	8
Rod MacDonald	8
Eddie MacKenzie	9
Blair Jay	5
Robert Campbell	3

Semifinals
Jamie Newson	9
Tyler Harris	6
Eddie MacKenzie	3
Blair Jay	2

Qualifier 1
Jamie Newson	8
Eddie MacKenzie	4

=== B Event ===
Second Knockout
Bill Hope	7
Donald Clarey	4
Kyle Stevenson	4
Robert Campbell	8

Quarterfinals
Bill Hope	3
Rod MacDonald	10
Robert Campbell	5
Blair Weeks	4

Semifinals
Tyler Harris	5
Rod MacDonald	6
Blair Jay	2
Robert Campbell	7

To Qualifier 2
Rod MacDonald	7
Robert Campbell	9
Qualifier 2
Robert Campbell	2
Eddie MacKenzie	6

=== C Event ===
Third Knockout		Qualifier 3
Tyler Harris	5
Blair Jay	10	Blair Jay	10
		Robert Campbell	8

Third Knockout		Semifinals		Qualifier 4
Donald Clarey	3
Blair Weeks	8	Blair Weeks	7
Kyle Stevenson	1	Bill Hope	6
Bill Hope	8			Blair Weeks	11
				Rod MacDonald	2

== Playoffs ==
Page playoff system
1	Jamie Newson	6
2	Eddie MacKenzie	7
3	Blair Jay	6
4	Blair Weeks	5

Semifinal
1	Jamie Newson	6
3	Blair Jay	4

Final
2	Eddie MacKenzie	6
1	Jamie Newson	4

=== 1 vs. 2 ===
Saturday, February 8, 7:00 pm

Sheet 2	1	2	3	4	5	6	7	8	9	10	11	Final
Jamie Newson 🔨	0	2	0	0	2	0	0	0	0	2	0	6
Eddie MacKenzie	0	0	0	0	0	2	2	2	0	0	1	7

=== 3 vs. 4 ===
Saturday, February 8, 7:00 pm

Sheet 3	1	2	3	4	5	6	7	8	9	10	Final
Blair Jay	0	0	2	0	0	1	0	2	0	1	6
Blair Weeks 🔨	0	2	0	1	0	0	1	0	1	0	5

=== Semifinal ===
Sunday, February 9, 2:00 pm

Sheet 2	1	2	3	4	5	6	7	8	9	10	Final
Jamie Newson 🔨	0	0	1	0	1	0	2	0	0	2	6
Blair Jay	0	0	0	1	0	1	0	0	2	0	4

=== Final ===
Sunday, February 9, 7:00 pm

Sheet 3	1	2	3	4	5	6	7	8	9	10	Final
Eddie MacKenzie 🔨	0	0	0	1	2	0	0	1	2	X	6
Jamie Newson	1	0	1	0	0	1	1	0	0	X	4

2014 PEI Tankard
(Prince Edward Island)
Eddie MacKenzie
3rd PEI Provincial Championship title
