= 2012 PEI Tankard =

- Host city: Cornwall, Prince Edward Island
- Arena: Cornwall Curling Club
- Dates: January 26–31
- Winner: Team Gaudet
- Curling club: Charlottetown CC, Charlottetown, PEI
- Skip: Mike Gaudet
- Third: Tyler MacKenzie
- Second: Tyler Harris
- Lead: Sean Clarey
- Finalist: Brett Gallant

The 2012 PEI Tankard was held from January 26 to 31 at the Cornwall Curling Club in Cornwall, Prince Edward Island. The winning team of Mike Gaudet, represented Prince Edward Island at the 2012 Tim Hortons Brier in Saskatoon, Saskatchewan.

== Teams ==
Skip	Vice	Second	Lead	Club
Robert Campbell	Philip Gorveatt	Eric Brodersen	Mike Dillon	Charlottetown Curling Club, Charlottetown
Donald Clarey	Larry Richards	David Rice	Steven MacLeod	Montague Curling Club, Montague
Brett Gallant	Eddie MacKenzie	Anson Carmody	Alex MacFadyen	Charlottetown Curling Club, Charlottetown
Mike Gaudet	Tyler MacKenzie	Tyler Harris	Sean Clarey	Charlottetown Curling Club, Charlottetown
Bill Hope	Craig Mackie	Matt Smith	David Murphy	Charlottetown Curling Club, Charlottetown / Cornwall Curling Club, Cornwall
Blair Jay	Kevin Ellsworth	Doug Simmons	Roland Richard	Silver Fox Curling & Yacht Club, Summerside
John Likely	Kyle Stevenson	Mark Butler	Doug MacGregor	Charlottetown Curling Club, Charlottetown
Robert Shaw (fourth)	Dennis Watts	Robbie Younker	Peter MacDonald (skip)	Charlottetown Curling Club, Charlottetown
Rod MacDonald	Kevin Champion	Mark O'Rourke	Andrew Robinson	Charlottetown Curling Club, Charlottetown
Jamie Newson	Pat Lynch	Jeff Gallant	John Desrosiers	Charlottetown Curling Club, Charlottetown
Charlie Wilkinson	Nick Fraser	Paul Gaudet	Jeff Brine	Charlottetown Curling Club, Charlottetown
Rob Young	Mark MacDonald	Brad Gardiner	Steve DeWolfe	Cornwall Curling Club, Cornwall

== Results ==
=== A Event ===
Round of 16
Bill Hope	4
John Likely	7
Peter MacDonald	7
Charlie Wilkinson	2
Jamie Newson	5
Blair Jay	4
Donald Clarey	8
Rob Young	6

Quarterfinals
Brett Gallant	7
John Likely	6
Robert Campbell	7
Peter MacDonald	6
Rod MacDonald	8
Jamie Newson	7
Mike Gaudet	3
Donald Clarey	9

Semifinals
Brett Gallant	3
Robert Campbell	5
Rod MacDonald	7
Donald Clarey	4

A Qualifier
Robert Campbell	4
Rod MacDonald	7

=== B Event ===
Round of 16
Peter MacDonald	3
Bill Hope	9
Jamie Newson	8
Charlie Wilkinson	7
Mike Gaudet	7
Blair Jay	2
John Likely	9
Rob Young	7

Quarterfinals
Donald Clarey	6
Bill Hope	9
Brett Gallant	6
Jamie Newson	4
Mike Gaudet	6
John Likely	5

Semifinals
Bill Hope	4
Brett Gallant	5
Robert Campbell	5
Mike Gaudet	6

B Qualifier
Brett Gallant	4
Mike Gaudet	6

=== C Event ===
Quarterfinals		Semifinals		C Qualifier 1
		Robert Campbell	7
Peter MacDonald	8	Peter MacDonald	3
Charlie Wilkinson	4			Robert Campbell	10
				John Likely	7
		John Likely	6
		Bill Hope	5

Quarterfinals		Semifinals		C Qualifier 2
Blair Jay	8
Donald Clarey	4	Blair Jay	2
Rob Young	2	Jamie Newson	5
Jamie Newson	8			Jamie Newson	6
				Brett Gallant	8

== Playoffs ==
Page playoff system
A	Rod MacDonald	4
B	Mike Gaudet	9
C1	Robert Campbell	5
C2	Brett Gallant	6

Semifinal
A	Rod MacDonald	6
C2	Brett Gallant	7

Final
B	Mike Gaudet	7
C2	Brett Gallant	5

=== 1 vs. 2 ===
January 29, 6:30 PM

Sheet 1	1	2	3	4	5	6	7	8	9	10	Final
Rod MacDonald 🔨	1	0	1	0	2	0	0	0	X	X	4
Mike Gaudet	0	3	0	2	0	2	1	1	X	X	9

=== 3 vs. 4 ===
January 29, 6:30 PM

Sheet 3	1	2	3	4	5	6	7	8	9	10	11	Final
Robert Campbell	0	0	1	1	0	0	0	2	0	1	0	5
Brett Gallant 🔨	0	2	0	0	0	2	0	0	1	0	1	6

=== Semifinal ===
January 30, 1:30 PM

Sheet 2	1	2	3	4	5	6	7	8	9	10	Final
Rod MacDonald	0	1	0	0	2	1	0	2	0	0	6
Brett Gallant 🔨	1	0	0	2	0	0	0	0	2	2	7

=== Final ===
January 30, 6:30 PM

Sheet 3	1	2	3	4	5	6	7	8	9	10	Final
Mike Gaudet	0	0	0	3	0	0	0	2	0	2	7
Brett Gallant 🔨	0	0	2	0	1	0	1	0	1	0	5

2012 Prince Edward Island Tankard

Mike Gaudet
Prince Edward Island Provincial Championship title
