= 2016 PEI Tankard =

- Host city: Charlottetown, Prince Edward Island
- Arena: Charlottetown Curling Complex
- Dates: January 29–February 2
- Winner: Adam Casey
- Curling club: Silver Fox Curling and Yacht Club, Summerside & Charlottetown Curling Complex, Charlottetown
- Skip: Adam Casey
- Third: David Mathers
- Second: Anson Carmody
- Lead: Robbie Doherty
- Finalist: Jamie Newson

The 2016 PEI Tankard, the provincial men's curling championship of Prince Edward Island, was held from January 29 to February 2 at the Charlottetown Curling Complex in Charlottetown, Prince Edward Island. The winning Adam Casey team represented Prince Edward Island at the 2016 Tim Hortons Brier in Ottawa.

As the Casey rink won all three events (A, B & C), no playoff was required.

== Teams ==
The teams are listed as follows:

Skip	Third	Second	Lead	Alternate	Club(s)
Tyler MacKenzie	Robert Campbell (skip)	Matthew Nabuurs	Sean Ledgerwood		Charlottetown Curling Complex, Charlottetown
Adam Casey	David Mathers	Anson Carmody	Robbie Doherty		Silver Fox Curling and Yacht Club, Summerside; Charlottetown Curling Complex, Charlottetown
Tyler Harris	Sam Ramsay	Cody Dixon	Sean Clarey		Charlottetown Curling Complex, Charlottetown; Montague Curling Club, Montague
Eddie MacKenzie	Blair Weeks	Philip Gorveatt	Mike Dillon	Mark Victor	Charlottetown Curling Complex, Charlottetown
Jamie Newson	John Likely	Mark O'Rourke	Mark Butler	Andrew Robinson	Charlottetown Curling Complex, Charlottetown
Tyler Smith	Brooks Roche	Dylan Lowery	Ryan Lowery		Crapaud Curling Club, Crapaud; Montague Curling Club, Montague

== Knockout Draw Brackets ==
=== A Event ===
First Knockout
Tyler Smith	6
Robert Campbell	7
Eddie MacKenzie	4
Tyler Harris	10

Semifinals
Adam Casey	6
Robert Campbell	3
Tyler Harris	3
Jamie Newson	7

A Qualifier
Adam Casey	11
Jamie Newson	3

=== B Event ===
Second Knockout
Tyler Smith	2
Tyler Harris	10
Eddie MacKenzie	3
Robert Campbell	9

Semifinals
Adam Casey	7
Tyler Harris	1
Jamie Newson	8
Robert Campbell	7

B Qualifier
Adam Casey	7
Jamie Newson	6

=== C Event ===
Third Knockout
Tyler Smith	7
Robert Campbell	6
Eddie MacKenzie	7
Tyler Harris	8

Semifinals
Adam Casey	8
Tyler Smith	2
Jamie Newson	7
Tyler Harris	1

C Qualifier
Adam Casey	8
Jamie Newson	1

2016 PEI Tankard
(Prince Edward Island)
Adam Casey
2nd PEI Provincial Championship title
