= PEI Men's Curling Championship =

- Established: 1936
- 2026 host city: Montague, Prince Edward Island
- 2026 arena: Montague Curling Club
- 2026 champion: Tyler Smith

Current edition
- 2026 PEI Men's Curling Championship

The PEI Men's Curling Championship, formerly the PEI Tankard, is the provincial championship for men's curling in the Canadian province of Prince Edward Island . The tournament is run by Curl PEI, the provincial curling association. The winner represents Team Prince Edward Island at The Brier.

Prince Edward Island has had a team in the Brier since 1936.

== Past champions ==
Year	Team	Winning club
2026	Tyler Smith, Adam Cocks, Edward White (3 players)	Crapaud Community Curling Club
2025	Tyler Smith, Adam Cocks, Christopher Gallant, Edward White	Crapaud Community Curling Club
2024	Tyler Smith, Adam Cocks, Christopher Gallant, Edward White	Crapaud Community Curling Club
2023	Tyler Smith, Adam Cocks, Alex MacFadyen, Edward White	Crapaud Community Curling Club
2022	Cancelled due to the COVID-19 pandemic in Prince Edward Island; Tyler Smith, Adam Cocks, Edward White and Ryan Lowery represented PEI at 2022 Brier	
2021	Eddie MacKenzie, Tyler Smith, Sean Ledgerwood, Ryan Lowery	Crapaud Community Curling Club, Montague Curling Club
2020	Bryan Cochrane, Ian MacAulay, Morgan Currie, Mark O'Rourke	Cornwall Curling Club
2019	John Likely, Anson Carmody, Steve Burgess, Robbie Doherty	Charlottetown Curling Complex, Western Community Curling Club
2018	Eddie MacKenzie, Josh Barry, Christopher Gallant, Sean Ledgerwood	Charlottetown Curling Complex
2017	Eddie MacKenzie, Sean Ledgerwood, Matt Nabuurs, Robbie Doherty	Charlottetown Curling Complex
2016	Adam Casey, David Mathers, Anson Carmody, Robbie Doherty	Silver Fox Curling and Yacht Club; Charlottetown Curling Complex
2015	Adam Casey, Josh Barry, Anson Carmody, Robbie Doherty	Silver Fox Curling and Yacht Club; Charlottetown Curling Complex
2014	Eddie MacKenzie, Anson Carmody, Tyler MacKenzie, Sean Ledgerwood	Charlottetown Curling Complex
2013	Eddie MacKenzie, Anson Carmody, Alex MacFadyen, Sean Ledgerwood	Charlottetown Curling Complex
2012	Mike Gaudet, Tyler MacKenzie, Tyler Harris, Sean Clarey	Charlottetown Curling Club
2011	Eddie MacKenzie, Mike Gaudet, Mike Dillon, Alex MacFadyen	Charlottetown Curling Club
2010	Rod MacDonald, Kevin Champion, Andrew Robinson, Mark O'Rourke	Charlottetown Curling Club
2009	Rod MacDonald, Kevin Champion, Andrew Robinson, Mark O'Rourke	Charlottetown Curling Club
2008	Peter Gallant, Kevin Champion, Mark O'Rourke, John Desrosiers	Charlottetown Curling Club
2007	Peter Gallant, Kevin Champion, Mark O'Rourke, Robert Campbell	Charlottetown Curling Club
2006	Rod MacDonald, Kevin Champion, Phillip Gorveatt, Mike Dillon	Charlottetown Curling Club
2005	Rod MacDonald, Kevin Champion, Phillip Gorveatt, Mike Dillon	Charlottetown Curling Club
2004	Mike Gaudet, Evan Sullivan, Craig Arsenault, Sean Ledgerwood	Silver Fox Curling and Yacht Club
2003	Robert Campbell, Kevin Champion, Phillip Gorveatt, Mike Dillon	Charlottetown Curling Club
2002	John Likely, Robert Campbell, Eric Brodersen, Jeff Smith	Charlottetown Curling Club
2001	Peter MacDonald, Peter Gallant, Mark O'Rourke, Mark Butler	Silver Fox Curling and Yacht Club
2000	Andrew Robinson, Evan Sullivan, Brian Scales, Bob Pritchett	Charlottetown Curling Club
1999	Robert Campbell, Peter Gallant, Mark O'Rourke, Mark Butler	Charlottetown Curling Club
1998	Garth Mitchell, Ken McGregor, Phillip McInnis, Brad Chugg	Charlottetown Curling Club
1997	Robert Campbell, Peter Gallant, Mark O'Rourke, Mark Butler	Charlottetown Curling Club
1996	Peter MacDonald, Grant Somers, John Postma, Rod MacDonald	Silver Fox Curling and Yacht Club
1995	Robert Campbell, Peter Gallant, Mark O'Rourke, Mark Butler	Charlottetown Curling Club
1994	Mike Gaudet, Eddie MacKenzie, Tyler Harris, Craig Arsenault	Charlottetown Curling Club
1993	Robert Campbell, Peter Gallant, Mark O'Rourke, Mark Butler	Charlottetown Curling Club
1992	Ted MacFadyen, Bill MacFadyen, Mike Coady, Sandy Foy	Crapaud Community Curling Club
1991	Robert Campbell, Peter Gallant, Mark O'Rourke, Mark Butler	Charlottetown Curling Club
1990	Ted MacFadyen, Bill MacFadyen, Mike Coady, Sandy Foy	Crapaud Community Curling Club
1989	Doug Weeks, Blair Weeks, Roy Rodd, David Weeks	Charlottetown Curling Club
1988	David MacFadyen, Frank MacDonald, Neil MacFadyen, Aidan Sheridan	Crapaud Community Curling Club
1987	Ted MacFadyen, Bill MacFadyen, Mike Coady, Sandy Foy	Crapaud Community Curling Club
1986	Grant Somers, Mel Bernard, John MacWilliams, Don Bourque	Silver Fox Curling and Yacht Club
1985	Wayne Matheson, Doug Weeks, John Likely, Billy Dillon	Charlottetown Curling Club
1984	Wayne Matheson, Ken MacDonald, Al Ledgerwood, Mark Victor	Charlottetown Curling Club
1983	Ted MacFadyen, Bill MacFadyen, Mike Coady, Sandy Foy	Crapaud Community Curling Club
1982	Peter Jenkins, Doug Weeks, Peter Gallant, Roy Rodd	Charlottetown Curling Club
1981	Peter MacDonald, Robert Carruthers, Alexander Stewart, Roddie MacDonald	Charlottetown Curling Club
1980	Ted MacFadyen, Bill MacFadyen, Mike Coady, Gordie Hermann	Crapaud Community Curling Club
1979	Wayne Matheson, Ken MacDonald, Al Legerwood, John Scales	Charlottetown Curling Club
1978	Peter MacDonald, Rod MacDonald, Ron Casey, Keith Wedge	Summerside Curling Club
1977	Ken MacDonald, George Dillon, Al Ledgerwood, Keith MacEachern	Belvedere Golf & Winter Club
1976	Ken MacDonald, Keith MacEachern, Peter MacDonald, Al Ledgerwood	Charlottetown Curling Club
1975	John Fortier, Don MacRae, David Kassner, Don Callbeck	Charlottetown Curling Club
1974	Bob Dillon, John Fortier, Jerry Muzika, Merrill Wigginton	Charlottetown Curling Club
1973	Bob Dillon, Doug Cameron, John Fortier, Merrill Wigginton	Charlottetown Curling Club
1972	Kip Ready, Bill MacGregor, David Kassner, Norm MacNeill	Charlottetown Curling Club
1971	Kip Ready, Bill MacGregor, David Kassner, Norm MacNeill	Charlottetown Curling Club
1970	Art Burke, George Dillon, Allison (Joe) Saunders, Lorne Burke	Charlottetown Curling Club
1969	Alan Smith, Doug Bell, Bob Dillon, Merrill Wigginton	Charlottetown Curling Club
1968	Alan Smith, Doug Bell, Bob Dillon, Merrill Wigginton	Charlottetown Curling Club
1967	Ken MacDonald, Ken MacKenzie, Paul DesRoches, John Murphy	Montague Curling Club
1966	Art Burke, Arnold Llewellyn, Ralph Manning, W. Temple Hooper	Charlottetown Curling Club
1965	Doug Cameron, Alan Smith, George Dillon, Bob Dillon	Charlottetown Curling Club
1964	Art Burke, Alan Smith, Bob Dillon, Stu Lavers	Charlottetown Curling Club
1963	Doug Cameron, George Dillon, Allison (Joe) Saunders, Arnold Llewellyn	Charlottetown Curling Club
1962	Art Burke, Alan Smith, Bob Dillon, Wayne Rhodenizer	Charlottetown Curling Club
1961	Doug Cameron, George Dillon, Allison (Joe) Saunders, Arnold Llewellyn	Charlottetown Curling Club
1960	Doug Cameron, George Dillon, Allison (Joe) Saunders, Arnold Llewellyn	Charlottetown Curling Club
1959	Cliff MacDonald, Doug Cameron, George Dillon, Art Burke	Charlottetown Curling Club
1958	Doug Cameron, George Dillon, Jim Cameron, Arnold Llewellyn	Charlottetown Curling Club
1957	Cliff MacDonald, Jim Cameron, Bill Mooreside, Gordon Stewart	Summerside Curling Club
1956	Wendell MacDonald, John Squarebriggs, Andy Likely, Elmer MacDonald	Charlottetown Curling Club
1955	Wendell MacDonald, John Squarebriggs, Andy Likely, Elmer MacDonald	Charlottetown Curling Club
1954	Wendell MacDonald, John Squarebriggs, Elmer MacDonald, Barry MacDonald	Charlottetown Curling Club
1953	Frank Acorn, Stewart Moore, Charles Kidd, Jim Campbell	Charlottetown Curling Club
1952	Frank Jens Hansen, Chris Gallant, Charles Kidd, Harold McInnis	Charlottetown Curling Club
1951	Frank Acorn, John Squarebriggs, Bill MacNeill, Mel Jenkins	Charlottetown Curling Club
1950	Heath Saunders, Doug Saunders, Dan O'Rourke, David MacLeod	Charlottetown Curling Club
1949	Russ Cruikshank, Heath McIntyre, James Howatt, Hiram Atkinson	Charlottetown Curling Club
1948	Gerald Hayes, Theron Morrison, Neil MacLennan, Fred McRae	Summerside Curling Club
1947	Frank Acorn, Andy Likely, John Squarebriggs, Arn Howatt	Charlottetown Curling Club
1946	Frank Jens Hansen, Walter Picard, Frank Cox, Wes Whitlock	Charlottetown Curling Club
	1943-1945 Brier cancelled	
1942	Russ Cruikshank, Harry Sear, Reginald Bell, Don Gass	Charlottetown Curling Club
1941	Russ Cruikshank, Dick Hughes, Ty Cobb, Harry Sear	Charlottetown Curling Club
1940	Mac McLaine, Dick Hughes, Reginald Bell, Jack Fraser	Charlottetown Curling Club
1939	Mac McLaine, Dick Hughes, Heath McIntyre, Charley Williams	Charlottetown Curling Club
1938	Mac McLaine, Dick Hughes, Jack Fraser, Charley Williams	Charlottetown Curling Club
1937	Art Belcher, Ty Cobb, Ed Miles, Bill Lord	Charlottetown Curling Club
1936	Jim McIntyre, C.K. Wightman, R.W. Beck, I.A. Younker	Montague Curling Club
