= 2018 PEI Tankard =

Men's curling championship held in 2018

- Host city: Cornwall, Prince Edward Island
- Arena: Cornwall Curling Club
- Dates: January 3-8
- Winner: Eddie MacKenzie
- Curling club: Charlottetown CC, Charlottetown
- Skip: Eddie MacKenzie
- Third: Josh Barry
- Second: Christopher Gallant
- Lead: Sean Ledgerwood
- Finalist: John Likely

The 2018 PEI Tankard, the provincial men's curling championship of Prince Edward Island, was held from January 13 to 9 at the Cornwall Curling Club in Cornwall, Prince Edward Island. The winning Eddie MacKenzie team represented Prince Edward Island at the 2018 Tim Hortons Brier.

== Teams ==
The teams are listed as follows:

Skip	Third	Second	Lead	Alternate	Club(s)
John Likely	Robert Campbell	Matt Nabuurs	Robbie Doherty		Charlottetown Curling Complex, Charlottetown; Silver Fox Curling and Yacht Community Complex, Summerside
Phil Gorveatt	Kevin Champion	Mike Dillon	Mark Victor		Charlottetown Curling Complex, Charlottetown
Tyler Harris	Tyler MacKenzie	Sam Ramsay	Sean Clarey		Charlottetown Curling Complex, Charlottetown; Western Community Curling Club, Alberton
Alan Inman	Calvin Smith	Nathan Hardy	Nick Blanchard		Crapaud Curling Club Crapud, Prince Edward Island
Eddie MacKenzie	Josh Barry	Christopher Gallant	Sean Ledgerwood		Charlottetown Curling Complex, Charlottetown

== Knockout draw brackets ==
=== A Event ===
Quarterfinals		Semifinals		Final
		Eddie MacKenzie	9
John Likely	9	Tyler Harris	3
Eddie MacKenzie	10			Eddie MacKenzie	10
				Phil Gorveatt	7
		Phil Gorveatt	6
		Alan Inman	4

=== B Event ===
B Event		Quarterfinals		Semifinals		B Final
				John Likely	10
John Likely	6			Phil Gorveatt	3
Alan Inman	3	John Likely	8
		Tyler Harris	4
						John Likely	10
						Eddie Mackenzie	8

=== C Event ===
C Event		Quarterfinals		Semifinals		C Final
				Tyler Harris	4
Alan Inman	3			Eddie MacKenzie	7
Tyler Harris	8	Tyler Harris	7
		Phil Gorveatt	2
						Eddie MacKenzie	7
						John Likely	2

== Playoffs ==
Semifinal			Final
			A	Eddie MacKenzie
B	John Likely	4	C	Eddie MacKenzie
C	Eddie MacKenzie	12

=== Final ===
Sunday, January 7, 1:00 pm

MacKenzie needed to be beaten twice

Team	1	2	3	4	5	6	7	8	9	10	Final
John Likely	0	0	1	0	2	0	1	0	X	X	4
Eddie MacKenzie 🔨	2	1	0	3	0	1	0	5	X	X	12

2018 PEI Tankard
(Prince Edward Island)
Eddie MacKenzie
6th PEI Provincial Championship title
