= 2026 PEI Men's Curling Championship =

Canadian provincial men's curling championship

- Host city: Montague, Prince Edward Island
- Arena: Montague Curling Club
- Dates: January 2–5
- Winner: Team Smith
- Curling club: Crapaud Community CC, Crapaud
- Skip: Tyler Smith
- Third: Adam Cocks
- Second: –
- Lead: Ed White
- Coach: Paul Flemming
- Finalist: Jamie Newson

The 2026 PEI Men's Curling Championship, the men's provincial curling championship for Prince Edward Island, was held from January 2 to 5 at the Montague Curling Club in Montague, Prince Edward Island. The winning Tyler Smith rink will represent Prince Edward Island at the 2026 Montana's Brier in St. John's, Newfoundland and Labrador. The event was held in conjunction with the 2026 PEI Women's Curling Championship.

Team Tyler Smith won the event with just three players as regular second Christopher Gallant was unavailable due to work commitments.

== Teams ==
The teams are listed as follows:

Skip	Third	Second	Lead	Alternate	Coach	Club
Tyler Harris	Tyler MacKenzie	Daniel MacFadyen	Nathan Hardy			Crapaud Community CC, Crapaud
Tim Hockin (Fourth)	Darren Higgins (Skip)	Mike Spencer	Jonathan Greenan			Summerside CC, Summerside
Ian MacAulay	Blair Weeks	Mark O'Rourke	Mike Dillon	Danny Kneabone		Cornwall CC, Cornwall
Jack MacFadyen	Chase MacMillan	Luke Butler	Davis Nicholson		David MacFadyen	Cornwall CC, Cornwall
Jamie Newson	Andrew Robinson	Chris Ellis	Greg Ellis			Crapaud Community CC, Crapaud
Calvin Smith	Connor Bruce	Connor MacEwen	Nate MacRae			Cornwall CC, Cornwall
Tyler Smith	Adam Cocks	– (Note: Team Smith played with three players.)	Ed White		Paul Flemming	Crapaud Community CC, Crapaud
Nick vanOuwerkerk	Steve vanOuwerkerk	Cruz Pineau	Alex MacFadyen			Crapaud Community CC, Crapaud
Dennis Watts	Erik Brodersen	Shane MacDonald	Andrew MacDougall			Cornwall CC, Cornwall

== Knockout Brackets ==
=== A Event ===
First Knockout	A Qualifier
Nick vanOuwerkerk	5
Dennis Watts	6
Dennis Watts	10
Ian MacAulay	1
Jamie Newson	2
Ian MacAulay	10
Dennis Watts	3
Tyler Smith	10
Tyler Smith	9
Tyler Harris	10	Tyler Harris	2
Calvin Smith	3	Tyler Smith	10
Jack MacFadyen	1
Darren Higgins	7
Jack MacFadyen	10

=== B Event ===
Second Knockout	B Qualifier
Dennis Watts	7
Jack MacFadyen	6	Jamie Newson	10
Jamie Newson	7	Jamie Newson	10	Jamie Newson	3
Calvin Smith	7	Nick vanOuwerkerk	0	Tyler Smith	6
Nick vanOuwerkerk	9	Tyler Smith	5
Ian MacAulay	10	Darren Higgins	4
Tyler Harris	7	Darren Higgins	13
Darren Higgins	8

=== C Event ===
Third Knockout	C Qualifier
Tyler Smith	8
Dennis Watts	7	Dennis Watts	1
Nick vanOuwerkerk	2	Ian MacAulay	4	Tyler Smith	10
Ian MacAulay	9	Jamie Newson	3
Jamie Newson	10
Darren Higgins	7	Darren Higgins	5
Jack MacFadyen	0	Calvin Smith	6
Calvin Smith	7	Calvin Smith	10
Tyler Harris	6

== Knockout Results ==
All draw times are listed in Atlantic Time (UTC−04:00).

=== Draw 1 ===
Friday, January 2, 9:00 am

Sheet A	1	2	3	4	5	6	7	8	9	10	Final
Tyler Harris 🔨	0	2	0	4	0	4	0	0	X	X	10
Calvin Smith	0	0	2	0	1	0	0	0	X	X	3

Sheet B	1	2	3	4	5	6	7	8	9	10	11	Final
Nick vanOuwerkerk	0	1	0	0	1	0	1	1	0	1	0	5
Dennis Watts 🔨	1	0	1	1	0	1	0	0	1	0	1	6

Sheet C	1	2	3	4	5	6	7	8	9	10	Final
Jamie Newson 🔨	1	0	0	1	0	0	0	X	X	X	2
Ian MacAulay	0	2	3	0	2	1	2	X	X	X	10

Sheet D	1	2	3	4	5	6	7	8	9	10	11	Final
Darren Higgins	1	0	3	1	0	0	0	2	0	0	0	7
Jack MacFadyen 🔨	0	1	0	0	1	1	1	0	2	1	3	10

=== Draw 2 ===
Friday, January 2, 2:00 pm

Sheet C	1	2	3	4	5	6	7	8	9	10	11	Final
Calvin Smith	0	1	0	0	1	1	3	1	0	0	0	7
Nick vanOuwerkerk 🔨	1	0	1	1	0	0	0	0	2	2	2	9

Sheet D	1	2	3	4	5	6	7	8	9	10	Final
Tyler Smith	0	0	1	0	3	3	2	X	X	X	9
Tyler Harris 🔨	0	1	0	1	0	0	0	X	X	X	2

=== Draw 3 ===
Friday, January 2, 7:00 pm

Sheet A	1	2	3	4	5	6	7	8	9	10	Final
Dennis Watts 🔨	1	1	3	0	5	X	X	X	X	X	10
Ian MacAulay	0	0	0	1	0	X	X	X	X	X	1

Sheet C	1	2	3	4	5	6	7	8	9	10	Final
Tyler Smith 🔨	4	3	0	2	1	X	X	X	X	X	10
Jack MacFadyen	0	0	1	0	0	X	X	X	X	X	1

=== Draw 4 ===
Saturday, January 3, 9:00 am

Sheet B	1	2	3	4	5	6	7	8	9	10	Final
Tyler Harris	1	0	0	1	1	0	2	0	2	0	7
Darren Higgins 🔨	0	2	1	0	0	1	0	1	0	3	8

Sheet D	1	2	3	4	5	6	7	8	9	10	Final
Jamie Newson 🔨	2	2	1	1	1	X	X	X	X	X	7
Nick vanOuwerkerk	0	0	0	0	0	X	X	X	X	X	0

=== Draw 5 ===
Saturday, January 3, 2:00 pm

Sheet B	1	2	3	4	5	6	7	8	9	10	Final
Dennis Watts 🔨	2	0	0	1	0	0	0	0	X	X	3
Tyler Smith	0	2	2	0	2	0	3	1	X	X	10

Sheet D	1	2	3	4	5	6	7	8	9	10	11	Final
Calvin Smith 🔨	0	1	0	0	3	1	0	0	1	0	1	7
Tyler Harris	0	0	2	0	0	0	0	1	0	3	0	6

=== Draw 6 ===
Saturday, January 3, 7:00 pm

Sheet A	1	2	3	4	5	6	7	8	9	10	Final
Jack MacFadyen	1	0	3	1	0	0	1	0	0	0	6
Jamie Newson 🔨	0	2	0	0	2	2	0	1	2	1	10

Sheet D	1	2	3	4	5	6	7	8	9	10	Final
Ian MacAulay 🔨	2	0	0	4	0	4	0	0	0	0	10
Darren Higgins	0	4	1	0	3	0	2	1	1	1	13

=== Draw 7 ===
Sunday, January 4, 9:00 am

Sheet A	1	2	3	4	5	6	7	8	9	10	Final
Tyler Smith 🔨	1	0	3	0	0	0	0	0	0	1	5
Darren Higgins	0	1	0	1	0	1	0	1	0	0	4

Sheet B	1	2	3	4	5	6	7	8	9	10	Final
Nick vanOuwerkerk	0	0	2	0	0	0	X	X	X	X	2
Ian MacAulay 🔨	0	1	0	0	4	4	X	X	X	X	9

Sheet C	1	2	3	4	5	6	7	8	9	10	Final
Jack MacFadyen	0	0	0	0	0	X	X	X	X	X	0
Calvin Smith 🔨	0	2	1	6	1	X	X	X	X	X	10

Sheet D	1	2	3	4	5	6	7	8	9	10	Final
Dennis Watts	1	1	0	2	1	0	0	1	1	0	7
Jamie Newson 🔨	0	0	2	0	0	5	2	0	0	1	10

=== Draw 8 ===
Sunday, January 4, 2:00 pm

Sheet C	1	2	3	4	5	6	7	8	9	10	Final
Jamie Newson	0	1	0	0	0	0	1	1	0	X	3
Tyler Smith 🔨	2	0	0	0	2	0	0	0	2	X	6

=== Draw 9 ===
Sunday, January 4, 7:00 pm

Sheet A	1	2	3	4	5	6	7	8	9	10	Final
Dennis Watts	0	2	1	0	0	0	1	1	2	X	7
Ian MacAulay 🔨	1	0	0	1	1	1	0	0	0	X	4

Sheet B	1	2	3	4	5	6	7	8	9	10	Final
Darren Higgins	2	1	1	0	0	1	1	0	0	1	7
Calvin Smith 🔨	0	0	0	1	1	0	0	2	2	0	6

=== Draw 10 ===
Monday, January 5, 9:00 am

Sheet A	1	2	3	4	5	6	7	8	9	10	Final
Jamie Newson 🔨	3	0	2	0	1	0	2	2	X	X	10
Darren Higgins	0	2	0	2	0	1	0	0	X	X	5

Sheet C	1	2	3	4	5	6	7	8	9	10	Final
Tyler Smith 🔨	2	0	1	0	3	2	X	X	X	X	8
Dennis Watts	0	1	0	0	0	0	X	X	X	X	1

=== Draw 11 ===
Monday, January 5, 2:00 pm

Sheet B	1	2	3	4	5	6	7	8	9	10	Final
Tyler Smith	2	0	3	1	1	0	3	X	X	X	10
Jamie Newson 🔨	0	2	0	0	0	1	0	X	X	X	3

== Playoffs ==
No playoff was needed as Team Tyler Smith won all three events.

2026 PEI Men's Curling Championship

Tyler Smith
4th Prince Edward Island Provincial Championship title
