= 2017 PEI Tankard =

- Host city: Summerside Prince Edward Island
- Arena: Silver Fox Curling and Yacht Club, Summerside
- Dates: January 18-22
- Winner: Eddie MacKenzie
- Curling club: Charlottetown CC, Charlottetown
- Skip: Eddie MacKenzie
- Third: Sean Ledgerwood
- Second: Matt Nabuurs
- Lead: Robbie Doherty
- Coach: Al Ledgerwood
- Finalist: Phil Gorveatt

The 2017 PEI Tankard, the provincial men's curling championship of Prince Edward Island, was held from January 18 to 22 at the Silver Fox Curling and Yacht Community Complex in Summerside, Prince Edward Island. The winning Eddie MacKenzie team represented Prince Edward Island at the 2017 Tim Hortons Brier in St. John's, Newfoundland and Labrador.

== Teams ==
The teams are listed as follows:

Skip	Third	Second	Lead	Alternate	Club(s)
Robert Campbell	John Likely	Mark O'Rourke	Rod MacDonald		Charlottetown Curling Complex, Charlottetown; Silver Fox Curling and Yacht Community Complex, Summerside
Phil Gorveatt	Kevin Champion	Mike Dillon	Mark Butler		Charlottetown Curling Complex, Charlottetown
Tyler Harris	Tyler MacKenzie	Sam Ramsay	Mike Trudeau		Charlottetown Curling Complex, Charlottetown; Western Community Curling Club, Alberton
Blair Jay	Barry Cameron	Darrell Thibeau	Alan Montgomery		Silver Fox Curling and Yacht Community Complex, Summerside
Eddie MacKenzie	Sean Ledgerwood	Matt Nabuurs	Robbie Doherty		Charlottetown Curling Complex, Charlottetown
Jamie Newson	Matt MacLean	Dan Richard	Connor MacPhee	Leslie Noye	Charlottetown Curling Complex, Charlottetown
Calvin Smith	Corey Miller	Pat Ramsay	Nick Blanchard		Silver Fox Curling and Yacht Community Complex, Summerside
Dennis Watts	Erik Brodersen	Andrew MacDougall	Doug MacGregor		Charlottetown Curling Complex, Charlottetown

== Knockout Draw Brackets ==
=== A Event ===
First Knockout		Semifinals		A Qualifier
Jamie Newson	7
Calvin Smith	3	Jamie Newson	3
Dennis Watts	5	Eddie MacKenzie	7
Eddie MacKenzie	8			Eddie MacKenzie	8
Tyler Harris	6			Blair Jay	4
Blair Jay	7	Blair Jay	6
Robert Campbell	7	Phil Gorveatt	4
Phil Gorveatt	8

=== B Event ===
Second Knockout
Dennis Watts	7
Calvin Smith	8
Tyler Harris	4
Robert Campbell	8

Quarterfinals
Calvin Smith	2
Phil Gorveatt	11
Robert Campbell	3
Jamie Newson	9

Semifinals
Eddie MacKenzie	3
Phil Gorveatt	8
Blair Jay	8
Jamie Newson	7

B Qualifier
Phil Gorveatt	8
Blair Jay	2

=== C Event ===
Third Knockout
Robert Campbell	7
Dennis Watts	5
Calvin Smith	5
Tyler Harris	8

Quarterfinals
Eddie MacKenzie	8
Robert Campbell	10
Jamie Newson	2
Tyler Harris	8

Semifinals
Blair Jay	6
Robert Campbell	8
Phil Gorveatt	7
Tyler Harris	2

C Qualifier
Robert Campbell	8
Phil Gorveatt	9

== Playoffs ==
Semifinal		Final
		Phil Gorveatt	2
Eddie MacKenzie	9	Eddie MacKenzie	8
Phil Gorveatt	7

=== Semifinal ===
Sunday, January 22, 9:00 am

Sheet 5	1	2	3	4	5	6	7	8	9	10	Final
Eddie MacKenzie	0	2	1	0	2	1	1	0	1	1	9
Phil Gorveatt 🔨	4	0	0	2	0	0	0	1	0	0	7

=== Final ===
Sunday, January 22, 2:30 pm

Sheet 3	1	2	3	4	5	6	7	8	9	10	Final
Eddie MacKenzie	1	2	1	1	0	0	0	3	X	X	8
Phil Gorveatt 🔨	0	0	0	0	0	1	1	0	X	X	2

2017 PEI Tankard
(Prince Edward Island)
Eddie MacKenzie
5th PEI Provincial Championship title
