= 2007 Labatt Tankard – Playdowns =

The 2007 Labatt Tankard Open Playdowns were held at the Crapaud Community Curling Club in Crapaud, Prince Edward Island from January 26–29. The top eight teams from the playdowns qualified for the final tournament.

== Teams ==
Skip	Third	Second	Lead	Locale
John Desrosiers	Matt McCarville	Jeff Gallant	Daniel Richard	Charlottetown Curling Club, Charlottetown
Peter Gallant	Kevin Champion	Mark O'Rourke	Robert Campbell	Charlottetown Curling Club, Charlottetown
John Likely	Phillip Gorveatt	Mark Butler	Mike Dillon	Charlottetown Curling Club, Charlottetown
Jody Jackson	Blair Weeks	Jamie Jackson	Andrew MacDougall	Charlottetown Curling Club, Charlottetown
Ted MacFadyen	Craig Mackie	Sandy Foy	Mike Coady	Charlottetown Curling Club, Charlottetown
Andrew Robinson	Tyler MacKenzie	Tyler Harris	Mark Waugh	Charlottetown Curling Club, Charlottetown
Robert Shaw	Sandy MacPhee	Robbie Younker	Derryl McCarville	Charlottetown Curling Club, Charlottetown
Kyle Stevenson	Pat Lynch	Kyle MacDonald	Phillip McInnis	Charlottetown Curling Club, Charlottetown
Dennis Watts	Eric McQuiggan	Rob Warren	Sean Clarey	Charlottetown Curling Club, Charlottetown
Charlie Wilkinson	John Mullin	Doug MacGregor	Roger Beazley	Charlottetown Curling Club, Charlottetown
Gordon Fall	Tony Quigley	John Holm	Don Williams	Crapaud Community Curling Club, Crapaud
Calvin Smith	Alan Inman	Jeff Mill	Dario Zannier	Crapaud Community Curling Club, Crapaud
Daryl MacDonald	Kyle Hardy	Kent Noye	Leslie Hardy	Maple Leaf Curling Club, O'Leary
Grant Somers	Clair Sweet	Bob Matheson	Wayne Arsenault	Maple Leaf Curling Club, O'Leary
Jeff Nelson	Pat Birtwhistle	Larry Richards	Steve MacLeod	Montague Curling Club, Montague
Mel Bernard	Blair Jay	Bill Hope	Earle Proude	Silver Fox Curling and Yacht Club, Summerside
Kevin Ellsworth	Kevin Smith	Pat Aylward	Merle Chappell	Silver Fox Curling and Yacht Club, Summerside
Jeff MacCallum	Gerry Burt	Jeff Hemphill	Troy Pridham	Silver Fox Curling and Yacht Club, Summerside
Rod MacDonald	Jamie Newsom	Mike Gaudet	Peter MacDonald	Silver Fox Curling and Yacht Club, Summerside
Leo Stewart	Barry Cameron	Corey Montgomery	Troy Pridham	Silver Fox Curling and Yacht Club, Summerside
Louis Walsh	Paul Matheson	Eidon Kilbride	Doug Waugh	Silver Fox Curling and Yacht Club, Summerside

== Playdowns ==
=== A Event ===
First Knockout		Semifinals		Qualifier 1
		Peter Gallant	11
Calvin Smith	9	Calvin Smith	7
Dennis Watts	4			Peter Gallant	9
Grant Somers	9			John Desrosiers	3
Daryl MacDonald	10	Daryl MacDonald	3
John Desrosiers	8	John Desrosiers	9
Ted MacFadyen	7

First Knockout		Semifinals		Qualifier 2
		John Likely	10
Jeff Nelson	6	Robert Shaw	1
Robert Shaw	10			John Likely	6
Jody Jackson	9			Kyle Stevenson	5
Louis Walsh	4	Jody Jackson	6
Kyle Stevenson	7	Kyle Stevenson	8
Jeff MacCallum	4

First Knockout		Semifinals		Qualifier 1
		Rod MacDonald	7
Charlie Wilkinson	8	Charlie Wilkinson	2
Leo Stewart	5			Rod MacDonald	8
Kevin Ellsworth	9			Kevin Ellsworth	4
Mel Bernard	8	Kevin Ellsworth	10
Andrew Robinson	8	Andrew Robinson	3
Gordon Fall	2

=== B Event ===
Second Knockout
Grant Somers	8
Ted MacFadyen	9

Quarterfinals
Dennis Watts	4
Charlie Wilkinson	9
Ted MacFadyen	6
Andrew Robinson	7

Semifinals
Charlie Wilkinson	4
Andrew Robinson	10

Qualifier 4
Kyle Stevenson	6
Andrew Robinson	7

Second Knockout
Louis Walsh	3
Jeff MacCallum	12

Quarterfinals
Jeff Nelson	12
Calvin Smith	8
Jeff MacCallum	6
Daryl MacDonald	5

Semifinals
Jeff Nelson	7
Jeff MacCallum	10

Qualifier 5
Kevin Ellsworth	7
Jeff MacCallum	6

Second Knockout
Mel Bernard	12
Gordon Fall	7

Quarterfinals
Leo Stewart	4
Robert Shaw	6
Mel Bernard	8
Jody Jackson	5

Semifinals
Robert Shaw	8
Mel Bernard	9

Qualifier 6
John Desrosiers	7
Mel Bernard	8

=== C Event ===
Third Knockout
Grant Somers	7
Louis Walsh	3
Gordon Fall	7
Dennis Watts	8

Quarterfinals
Charlie Wilkinson	7
Ted MacFadyen	8
Grant Somers	4
Robert Shaw	11
Jody Jackson	7
Dennis Watts	5

Semifinals
Ted MacFayen	6
Robert Shaw	7
John Desrosiers	4
Jody Jackson	7

Qualifier 7
Robert Shaw	6
Jody Jackson	5

Third Knockout
Calvin Smith	3
Daryl MacDonald	6
Jeff Nelson	8
Leo Stewart	6

Semifinals
Kyle Stevenson	8
Daryl MacDonald	2
Jeff MacCullum	8
Jeff Nelson	3

Qualifier 8
Kyle Stevenson	7
Jeff MacCallum	1
