= 2009 PEI Labatt Tankard =

- Host city: Montague, Prince Edward Island
- Arena: Montague Curling Club
- Dates: February 10–15
- Winner: Team MacDonald
- Curling club: Charlottetown CC, Charlottetown, PEI
- Skip: Rod MacDonald
- Third: Kevin Champion
- Second: Andrew Robinson
- Lead: Mark O'Rourke
- Alternate: Peter MacDonald
- Finalist: John Likely

The 2009 PEI Labatt Tankard (Prince Edward Island's men's provincial curling championship) was held February 10-15 at the Montague Curling Club in Montague, Prince Edward Island. The winning Rod MacDonald team represented Prince Edward Island at the 2009 Tim Hortons Brier in Calgary.

== Teams ==
Skip	Vice	Second	Lead	Alternate	Club
Mel Bernard	Blair Jay	Doug Simmons	Earle Proud		Silver Fox Curling Club, Summerside
Mike Gaudet	Eddie MacKenzie	Tyler Harris	Sean Clarey		Charlottetown Curling Club, Charlottetown
Bill Hope	Dennis Watts	Jeff Gallant	Phillip MacInnis		Charlottetown Curling Club, Charlottetown
John Likely	Phil Gorveatt	Mark Butler	Mike Dillon	Robert Campbell	Charlottetown Curling Club, Charlottetown
Rod MacDonald	Kevin Champion	Andrew Robinson	Mark O'Rourke	Peter MacDonald	Charlottetown Curling Club, Charlottetown
Ted MacFayden	Craig Mackie	David Murphy	Mike Coady		Charlottetown Curling Club, Charlottetown
Jamie Newson	Tim Hockin	Darren Higgins	Matthew MacCarville		Charlottetown Curling Club, Charlottetown
Clair Sweet	Bob Matheson	Muncey Harris	Wayne Arsenault		Maple Leaf Curling Club, O'Leary

== Standings ==
Skip (Club)	W	L
John Likely (Charlottetown)	6	1
Ted MacFayden (Charlottetown)	5	2
Rod MacDonald (Charlottetown)	5	2
Bill Hope (Charlottetown)	3	4
Mel Bernard (Silver Fox)	3	4
Jamie Newson (Charlottetown)	3	4
Mike Gaudet (Charlottetown)	2	5
Clair Sweet (Maple Leaf)	1	6

== Results ==
=== Draw 1 ===
February 10, 1900

Sheet 1	1	2	3	4	5	6	7	8	9	10	Final
Rod MacDonald 🔨	1	0	2	0	3	0	2	0	X	X	8
Clair Sweet	0	1	0	1	0	1	0	1	X	X	4

Sheet 2	1	2	3	4	5	6	7	8	9	10	Final
John Likely 🔨	0	1	0	1	0	0	2	0	0	1	5
Bill Hope	0	0	1	0	1	0	0	2	0	0	4

Sheet 3	1	2	3	4	5	6	7	8	9	10	Final
Jamie Newson 🔨	4	0	0	4	0	1	0	0	2	X	11
Mike Gaudet	0	1	0	0	2	0	2	2	0	X	7

Sheet 4	1	2	3	4	5	6	7	8	9	10	Final
Mel Bernard	0	0	1	0	1	0	1	0	X	X	3
Ted MacFayden 🔨	1	2	0	3	0	1	0	1	X	X	8

=== Draw 2 ===
February 11, 1400

Sheet 1	1	2	3	4	5	6	7	8	9	10	Final
Mike Gaudet 🔨	2	0	1	0	1	0	1	0	3	X	8
Ted MacFayden	0	2	0	1	0	1	0	1	0	X	5

Sheet 2	1	2	3	4	5	6	7	8	9	10	Final
Jamie Newson 🔨	1	0	0	0	0	3	0	0	X	X	4
Mel Bernard	0	0	3	1	2	0	2	1	X	X	9

Sheet 3	1	2	3	4	5	6	7	8	9	10	11	Final
Clair Sweet 🔨	1	0	2	0	1	0	2	0	2	0	1	9
Bill Hope	0	2	0	2	0	1	0	2	0	1	0	8

Sheet 4	1	2	3	4	5	6	7	8	9	10	Final
John Likely 🔨	2	1	0	0	1	0	3	0	2	X	9
Rod MacDonald	0	0	0	2	0	1	0	1	0	X	4

=== Draw 3 ===
February 11, 2000

Sheet 1	1	2	3	4	5	6	7	8	9	10	Final
Bill Hope 🔨	0	1	0	2	0	0	2	2	0	X	7
Jamie Newson	0	0	1	0	1	1	0	0	1	X	4

Sheet 2	1	2	3	4	5	6	7	8	9	10	Final
Ted MacFayden 🔨	0	0	4	0	1	2	0	0	1	0	8
Rod MacDonald	0	0	0	3	0	0	2	1	0	1	7

Sheet 3	1	2	3	4	5	6	7	8	9	10	Final
Mel Bernard	0	1	0	0	1	1	0	1	0	0	4
John Likely 🔨	0	0	1	1	0	0	2	0	0	1	5

Sheet 4	1	2	3	4	5	6	7	8	9	10	Final
Clair Sweet 🔨	0	0	0	0	1	0	X	X	X	X	1
Mike Gaudet	1	1	2	1	0	3	X	X	X	X	8

=== Draw 4 ===
February 12, 1400

Sheet 1	1	2	3	4	5	6	7	8	9	10	Final
John Likely 🔨	0	0	0	1	1	1	0	2	0	2	7
Mike Gaudet	0	0	0	0	0	0	3	0	1	0	4

Sheet 2	1	2	3	4	5	6	7	8	9	10	Final
Mel Bernard 🔨	0	0	2	0	2	1	1	0	0	1	7
Clair Sweet	0	1	0	3	0	0	0	1	1	0	6

Sheet 3	1	2	3	4	5	6	7	8	9	10	Final
Rod MacDonald 🔨	0	0	2	3	1	0	2	0	2	X	10
Jamie Newson	2	1	0	0	0	1	0	1	0	X	5

Sheet 4	1	2	3	4	5	6	7	8	9	10	Final
Bill Hope 🔨	0	1	0	2	0	1	0	1	0	X	5
Ted MacFayden	0	0	2	0	3	0	2	0	1	X	8

=== Draw 5 ===
February 12, 1900

Sheet 1	1	2	3	4	5	6	7	8	9	10	11	Final
Rod MacDonald 🔨	2	1	0	1	0	0	0	1	1	0	1	7
Mel Bernard	0	0	2	0	0	1	1	0	0	2	0	6

Sheet 2	1	2	3	4	5	6	7	8	9	10	Final
Mike Gaudet 🔨	0	1	0	1	1	0	2	0	0	X	5
Bill Hope	1	0	2	0	0	1	0	2	1	X	7

Sheet 3	1	2	3	4	5	6	7	8	9	10	Final
Ted MacFayden 🔨	0	2	0	1	1	0	0	2	0	X	6
John Likely	0	0	0	0	0	1	1	0	1	X	3

Sheet 4	1	2	3	4	5	6	7	8	9	10	Final
Jamie Newson 🔨	0	5	0	3	0	0	2	X	X	X	10
Clair Sweet	1	0	1	0	2	0	0	X	X	X	4

=== Draw 6 ===
February 13, 1400

Sheet 1	1	2	3	4	5	6	7	8	9	10	Final
Clair Sweet 🔨	0	1	0	0	0	0	0	1	X	X	2
John Likely	0	0	2	0	1	1	2	0	X	X	6

Sheet 2	1	2	3	4	5	6	7	8	9	10	Final
Jamie Newson 🔨	0	2	0	0	2	1	0	1	X	X	6
Ted MacFayden	1	0	0	1	0	0	1	0	X	X	3

Sheet 3	1	2	3	4	5	6	7	8	9	10	Final
Bill Hope 🔨	0	0	3	0	1	0	2	0	1	0	7
Rod MacDonald	0	2	0	2	0	2	0	1	0	1	8

Sheet 4	1	2	3	4	5	6	7	8	9	10	Final
Mike Gaudet 🔨	2	0	1	0	0	2	0	0	1	0	6
Mel Bernard	0	1	0	1	2	0	1	1	0	1	7

=== Draw 7 ===
February 13, 1900

Sheet 1	1	2	3	4	5	6	7	8	9	10	Final
Mel Bernard 🔨	0	1	0	0	0	1	0	2	0	X	4
Bill Hope	0	0	2	1	1	0	3	0	1	X	8

Sheet 2	1	2	3	4	5	6	7	8	9	10	Final
Rod MacDonald 🔨	0	2	1	3	0	0	0	X	X	X	6
Mike Gaudet	0	0	0	0	1	1	1	X	X	X	3

Sheet 3	1	2	3	4	5	6	7	8	9	10	Final
Ted MacFayden🔨	0	3	2	2	0	X	X	X	X	X	7
Clair Sweet	1	0	0	0	1	X	X	X	X	X	2

Sheet 4	1	2	3	4	5	6	7	8	9	10	Final
John Likely 🔨	1	3	1	0	X	X	X	X	X	X	5
Jamie Newson	0	0	0	1	X	X	X	X	X	X	1

=== Tiebreakers ===
February 14, 0900

Sheet 2	1	2	3	4	5	6	7	8	9	10	Final
Jamie Newson	0	0	0	2	0	0	X	X	X	X	2
Mel Bernard 🔨	1	3	1	0	2	2	X	X	X	X	9

February 14, 1400

Sheet 3	1	2	3	4	5	6	7	8	9	10	Final
Bill Hope 🔨	2	0	1	0	3	0	3	1	X	X	10
Mel Bernard	0	1	0	1	0	3	0	0	X	X	5

== Playoffs ==
Page playoff system
1	John Likely	5
2	Ted MacFayden	4
3	Rod MacDonald	7
4	Bill Hope	0

Semifinal
2	Ted MacFayden	4
3	Rod MacDonald	6

Final
1	John Likely	6
3	Rod MacDonald	7

=== 1 vs. 2 ===
February 14, 1900

Sheet 2	1	2	3	4	5	6	7	8	9	10	Final
John Likely 🔨	0	0	1	1	0	1	0	1	0	1	5
Ted MacFayden	1	0	0	0	1	0	1	0	1	0	4

=== 3 vs. 4 ===
February 14, 1900

Sheet 1	1	2	3	4	5	6	7	8	9	10	Final
Rod MacDonald 🔨	1	0	0	1	2	3	X	X	X	X	7
Bill Hope	0	0	0	0	0	0	X	X	X	X	0

=== Semi-final ===
February 15, 1000

Sheet 4	1	2	3	4	5	6	7	8	9	10	Final
Rod MacDonald	0	1	0	1	0	1	1	1	0	1	6
Ted MacFayden 🔨	1	0	1	0	1	0	0	0	1	0	4

=== Final ===
February 15, 1500

Sheet 3	1	2	3	4	5	6	7	8	9	10	11	Final
Rod MacDonald	0	0	0	2	1	0	2	0	1	0	1	7
John Likely 🔨	0	0	2	0	0	1	0	2	0	1	0	6
