= 2015 PEI Tankard =

- Host city: Alberton, Prince Edward Island
- Arena: Western Community Curling Club
- Dates: February 6–10
- Winner: Adam Casey
- Curling club: Silver Fox C&YC, Summerside; Charlottetown CC, Charlottetown
- Skip: Adam Casey
- Third: Josh Barry
- Second: Anson Carmody
- Lead: Robbie Doherty
- Finalist: Jamie Newson

The 2015 PEI Tankard, the provincial men's curling championship of Prince Edward Island, was held from February 6 to 10 at the Western Community Curling Club in Alberton, Prince Edward Island. The winning Adam Casey team represented Prince Edward Island at the 2015 Tim Hortons Brier in Calgary.

== Teams ==
The teams are listed as follows:

Skip	Third	Second	Lead	Alternate	Club(s)
Robert Campbell	Kyle Holland	Mike Dillon	Taylor McInnis		Charlottetown Curling Complex, Charlottetown
Adam Casey	Josh Barry	Anson Carmody	Robbie Doherty		Silver Fox Curling and Yacht Club, Summerside; Charlottetown Curling Complex, Charlottetown
Tyler Harris	Sam Ramsay	Cody Dixon	Mike Trudeau		Charlottetown Curling Complex, Charlottetown
Blair Jay	Marc Leclair	Aidan Downey	Roland Richard		Silver Fox Curling and Yacht Club, Summerside
Tyler MacKenzie	Kevin Champion	Matthew Nabuurs	Sean Ledgerwood	Philip Gorveatt	Charlottetown Curling Complex, Charlottetown
Jamie Newson	Andrew Robinson	Sean Clarey	Shawn Pitre		Charlottetown Curling Complex, Charlottetown

== Knockout Draw Brackets ==
=== A event ===
First Knockout
Tyler MacKenzie	0
Robert Campbell	8
Blair Jay	5
Jamie Newson	9

Semifinals
Adam Casey	8
Robert Campbell	0
Tyler Harris	6
Jamie Newson	8

A Qualifier
Adam Casey	5
Jamie Newson	6

=== B event ===
Second Knockout		Quarterfinals		Semifinals		B Qualifier
				Adam Casey	11
Tyler MacKenzie	8			Tyler MacKenzie	3
Tyler Harris	2	Tyler MacKenzie	5
Blair Jay	4	Robert Campbell	4
Robert Campbell	8					Adam Casey	9
						Jamie Newson	8

=== C event ===
Third Knockout
Tyler Harris	8
Blair Jay	5

Quarterfinals
Robert Campbell	7
Tyler Harris	2

Semifinals
Tyler MacKenzie	9
Robert Campbell	5

To C Qualifier
Tyler MacKenzie	8
Jamie Newson	7
C Qualifier
Adam Casey	7
Tyler MacKenzie	5

== Knockout results ==
=== Draw 1 ===
Friday, February 6, 2:00 pm

Sheet 1	1	2	3	4	5	6	7	8	9	10	Final
Tyler MacKenzie	0	0	0	0	0	0	0	X	X	X	0
Robert Campbell 🔨	1	0	2	0	1	1	3	X	X	X	8

Sheet 3	1	2	3	4	5	6	7	8	9	10	Final
Blair Jay	0	1	0	0	3	0	1	0	0	X	5
Jamie Newson 🔨	1	0	1	2	0	1	0	2	2	X	9

=== Draw 2 ===
Friday, February 6, 6:30 pm

Sheet 1	1	2	3	4	5	6	7	8	9	10	Final
Tyler Harris	2	0	1	0	0	0	2	0	1	X	6
Jamie Newson 🔨	0	3	0	0	1	3	0	1	0	X	8

Sheet 3	1	2	3	4	5	6	7	8	9	10	Final
Adam Casey	1	1	0	1	1	2	2	X	X	X	8
Robert Campbell 🔨	0	0	0	0	0	0	0	X	X	X	0

=== Draw 2 ===
Saturday, February 7, 10:00 am

Sheet 1	1	2	3	4	5	6	7	8	9	10	Final
Blair Jay	0	2	0	0	0	0	0	2	0	X	4
Robert Campbell 🔨	2	0	0	1	0	3	0	0	2	X	8

Sheet 2	1	2	3	4	5	6	7	8	9	10	Final
Adam Casey	0	0	0	0	2	0	2	0	1	X	5
Jamie Newson 🔨	0	1	1	0	0	2	0	2	0	X	6

Sheet 3	1	2	3	4	5	6	7	8	9	10	Final
Tyler MacKenzie 🔨	3	2	0	2	0	1	X	X	X	X	8
Tyler Harris	0	0	2	0	0	0	X	X	X	X	2

=== Draw 4 ===
Saturday, February 7, 3:30 pm

Sheet 2	1	2	3	4	5	6	7	8	9	10	11	Final
Tyler MacKenzie 🔨	0	0	0	2	0	1	0	0	1	0	1	5
Robert Campbell	0	0	0	0	2	0	1	0	0	1	0	4

Sheet 3	1	2	3	4	5	6	7	8	9	10	Final
Tyler Harris	2	0	0	0	4	0	1	1	0	X	8
Blair Jay 🔨	0	0	2	0	0	2	0	0	1	X	5

=== Draw 5 ===
Sunday, February 8, 11:00 am

Sheet 1	1	2	3	4	5	6	7	8	9	10	Final
Adam Casey	3	1	0	4	0	3	x	x	x	x	11
Tyler MacKenzie 🔨	0	0	2	0	1	0	x	x	x	x	3

Sheet 2	1	2	3	4	5	6	7	8	9	10	Final
Robert Campbell	0	0	0	1	1	0	5	x	x	x	7
Tyler Harris 🔨	0	0	1	0	0	1	0	x	x	x	2

=== Draw 6 ===
Sunday, February 8, 3:30 pm

Sheet 2	1	2	3	4	5	6	7	8	9	10	Final
Adam Casey	0	1	2	0	1	0	1	0	2	2	9
Jamie Newson 🔨	1	0	0	3	0	3	0	1	0	0	8

Sheet 3	1	2	3	4	5	6	7	8	9	10	Final
Robert Campbell 🔨	2	0	0	0	1	0	2	0	0	x	5
Tyler MacKenzie	0	1	1	1	0	2	0	2	2	x	9

=== Draw 7 ===
Monday, February 9, 11:00 am

Sheet 1	1	2	3	4	5	6	7	8	9	10	Final
Tyler MacKenzie 🔨	2	0	3	0	1	0	0	0	0	2	8
Jamie Newson	0	1	0	1	0	3	2	0	0	0	7

=== Draw 8 ===
Monday, February 9, 3:30 pm

Sheet 2	1	2	3	4	5	6	7	8	9	10	Final
Adam Casey	0	0	2	0	3	0	0	1	0	1	7
Tyler MacKenzie 🔨	1	0	0	0	0	2	1	0	1	0	5

== Playoffs ==
The playoffs round involves the teams that won the three qualifying matches. Since Casey won two of the three matches and was in all three matches, Casey received berths in both the semifinal and the final. Newson will need to defeat Casey twice in order to claim the championship, while if Casey wins either playoff game, he will claim the championship.

Semifinal			Final
			A	Adam Casey
B	Jamie Newson	6	C	Adam Casey
C	Adam Casey	7

=== Semifinal ===
Tuesday, February 10, 11:00 am

Sheet 1	1	2	3	4	5	6	7	8	9	10	11	Final
Jamie Newson	0	1	0	1	0	1	1	0	0	2	0	6
Adam Casey 🔨	2	0	1	0	2	0	0	1	0	0	1	7

=== Final ===
Not required.

2015 PEI Tankard
(Prince Edward Island)
Adam Casey
1st PEI Provincial Championship title
