= 2010 PEI Labatt Tankard =

- Host city: Alberton, Prince Edward Island
- Arena: Western Community Curling Club
- Dates: February 4–7
- Winner: Team MacDonald
- Curling club: Charlottetown CC, Charlottetown, PEI
- Skip: Rod MacDonald
- Third: Kevin Champion
- Second: Andrew Robinson
- Lead: Mark O'Rourke
- Finalist: Robert Campbell

The 2010 PEI Labatt Tankard was held February 4-7 at the Western Community Curling Club in Alberton, Prince Edward Island. The winning Rod MacDonald team represented Prince Edward Island at the 2010 Tim Hortons Brier in Halifax, Nova Scotia.

== Participating teams ==
Skip	Third	Second	Lead	Curling club
Bill Hope	Craig Mackie	Ted MacFadyen	Mike Coady	Charlottetown Curling Club, Charlottetown
Robert Campbell	Steve Burgess	Jamie Newson	Robbie Doherty	Charlotteotwn Curling Club, Charlottetown
Tom Fetterly	Terry Arsenault	Tim Hockin	Pat Aylward	Silver Fox Curling and Yacht Club, Summerside
John Likely	Mark Butler	Phillip Gorveatt	Mike Dillon	Charlottetown Curling Club, Charlottetown
Rod MacDonald	Kevin Champion	Andrew Robinson	Mark O'Rourke	Charlottetown Curling Club, Charlottetown
Eddie MacKenzie	Mike Gaudet	Tyler Harris	Sean Clarey	Charlottetown Curling Club, Charlottetown

== Standings ==
Skip	W	L
MacDonald	5	0
MacKenzie	3	2
Campbell	3	2
Likely	3	2
Hope	1	4
Fetterly	0	5

== Results ==
=== February 4 ===
- MacKenzie 10-7 Hope
- Likely 8-4 Fetterly
- MacDonald 8-3 Campbell
- Likely 8-7 Campbell
- MacDonald 7-4 Hope
- MacKenzie 9-4 Fetterly

=== February 5 ===
- Campbell 7-5 MacKenzie
- Hope 8-5 Fetterly
- MacDonald 7-2 Likely
- MacDonald 11-10 Fetterly (11)
- MacKenzie 6-5 Likely
- Campbell 6-4 Hope

== Tie-breaker ==
February 6

- Campbell 8-3 Likely

== Playoffs ==
Semifinal			Final
			1	Rod MacDonald	5
2	Eddie MacKenzie	6	3	Robert Campbell	4
3	Robert Campbell	9

=== Semi-final ===
February 7

Sheet 1	1	2	3	4	5	6	7	8	9	10	Final
Robert Campbell	0	4	0	3	0	0	2	0	0	X	9
Eddie MacKenzie	2	0	1	0	0	1	0	0	2	X	6

=== Final ===
February 7

Sheet 2	1	2	3	4	5	6	7	8	9	10	Final
Rod MacDonald	1	0	0	0	1	0	2	0	0	1	5
Robert Campbell	0	2	0	0	0	1	0	1	0	0	4
