= 2008 PEI Labatt Tankard =

2018 PEI Labatt Tankard
- Host city: Crapaud
- Arena: Crapaud Community Curling Club
- Dates: February 5–10, 2008
- Winner: Team Gallant
- Skip: Peter Gallant
- Third: Kevin Champion
- Second: Mark O'Rourke
- Lead: John Desrosiers
- Finalist: Team Likely
- Skip: John Likely
- Third: Phil Gorveatt
- Second: Mark Butler
- Lead: Mike Dillon

The 2008 PEI Labatt Tankard was held at the Crapaud Community Curling Club in Crapaud, Prince Edward Island, February 5–10, 2008. The winning team represented Prince Edward Island at the 2008 Tim Hortons Brier. An open qualifier was held for the event in Montague, Prince Edward Island with the top 8 teams winning a berth to play in the main event.

== Teams ==
The teams are as follows

Skip	Third	Second	Lead	Club
Tim Cullen	Mitch O'Shea	Robbie Doherty	Patrick Callback	Charlottetown Curling Club
Rod MacDonald	Jamie Newson	Mike Gaudet	Peter MacDonald	Silver Fox Curling Club
Peter Gallant	Kevin Champion	Mark O'Rourke	John Desrosiers	Charlottetown Curling Club
Ted MacFadyen	Craig Mackie	Sandy Foy	Mike Coady	Charlottetown Curling Club
Kyle Stevenson	Pat Lynch	Kyle MacDonald	Andrew MacDougall	Charlottetown Curling Club
John Likely	Phil Gorveatt	Mark Butler	Mike Dillon	Charlottetown Curling Club
Robert Shaw	Sandy MacPhee	Robbie Younker	Tom Fetterly	Charlottetown Curling Club
Eddie MacKenzie	Dennis Watts	Doug MacGregor	Sean Clarey	Charlottetown Curling Club

== Round robin standings ==
Skip (Club)	W	L
John Likely (Charlottetown)	5	2
Peter Gallant (Charlottetown)	5	2
Rod MacDonald (Silver Fox)	5	2
Kyle Stevenson (Charlottetown)	4	3
Robert Shaw (Charlottetown)	4	3
Tim Cullen (Charlottetown)	3	4
Ted MacFadyen (Charlottetown)	2	5
Eddie MacKenzie (Charlottetown)	0	7

== Round robin results ==
All times listed in Atlantic Standard Time (UTC−04:00)

=== Draw 1 ===
Tuesday February 5th at 7pm

Sheet 1	1	2	3	4	5	6	7	8	9	10	11	Final
Eddie MacKenzie	0	3	0	2	0	0	0	1	0	2	0	8
Tim Cullen 🔨	2	0	2	0	1	0	0	0	3	0	1	9

Sheet 2	1	2	3	4	5	6	7	8	9	10	11	Final
Robert Shaw	0	1	1	0	1	0	0	2	0	2	0	7
Rod MacDonald 🔨	0	0	0	3	0	0	2	0	2	0	2	9

Sheet 3	1	2	3	4	5	6	7	8	9	10	Final
John Likely	1	0	0	0	2	0	0	2	0	X	5
Peter Gallant 🔨	0	0	2	0	0	1	3	0	1	X	7

Sheet 4	1	2	3	4	5	6	7	8	9	10	Final
Kyle Stevenson	0	1	0	4	0	2	0	3	0	1	11
Ted MacFadyen 🔨	1	0	2	0	4	0	2	0	1	0	10

=== Draw 2 ===
Wednesday, February 6th at 2 pm

Sheet 1	1	2	3	4	5	6	7	8	9	10	Final
John Likely 🔨	1	2	0	0	0	3	1	2	X	X	9
Kyle Stevenson	0	0	1	1	1	0	0	0	X	X	3

Sheet 2	1	2	3	4	5	6	7	8	9	10	Final
Peter Gallant 🔨	2	0	2	0	5	X	X	X	X	X	9
Ted MacFadyen	0	1	0	1	0	X	X	X	X	X	2

Sheet 3	1	2	3	4	5	6	7	8	9	10	Final
Eddie MacKenzie 🔨	1	2	0	1	0	0	1	0	0	X	5
Robert Shaw	0	0	2	0	3	1	0	1	2	X	9

Sheet 4	1	2	3	4	5	6	7	8	9	10	Final
Rod MacDonald 🔨	2	0	2	1	1	1	X	X	X	X	7
Tim Cullen	0	1	0	0	0	0	X	X	X	X	1

=== Draw 3 ===
Wednesday February 6th at 8pm

Sheet 1	1	2	3	4	5	6	7	8	9	10	Final
Robert Shaw 🔨	0	1	0	1	0	2	0	0	0	X	4
Peter Gallant	0	0	1	0	3	0	2	1	3	X	10

Sheet 2	1	2	3	4	5	6	7	8	9	10	Final
Kyle Stevenson 🔨	1	1	0	2	1	0	3	X	X	X	8
Tim Cullen	0	0	1	0	0	1	0	X	X	X	2

Sheet 3	1	2	3	4	5	6	7	8	9	10	Final
Ted MacFadyen 🔨	2	1	1	1	0	1	0	4	X	X	10
Rod MacDonald	0	0	0	0	4	0	1	0	X	X	5

Sheet 4	1	2	3	4	5	6	7	8	9	10	Final
Eddie MacKenzie 🔨	0	0	2	0	2	0	1	0	0	X	5
John Likely	0	1	0	3	0	0	0	2	2	X	8

=== Draw 4 ===
Thursday February 7th at 2pm

Sheet 1	1	2	3	4	5	6	7	8	9	10	Final
Rod Macdonald 🔨	2	0	0	0	2	0	2	0	0	X	6
John Likely	0	2	0	0	0	2	0	3	2	X	9

Sheet 2	1	2	3	4	5	6	7	8	9	10	Final
Ted MacFadyen 🔨	0	3	0	0	2	0	0	0	2	X	7
Eddie MacKenzie	1	0	1	1	0	1	0	1	0	X	5

Sheet 3	1	2	3	4	5	6	7	8	9	10	Final
Tim Cullen 🔨	0	0	0	2	1	0	0	1	0	X	4
Peter Gallant	1	1	2	0	0	2	1	0	2	X	9

Sheet 4	1	2	3	4	5	6	7	8	9	10	Final
Robert Shaw 🔨	1	0	1	3	0	2	2	X	X	X	9
Kyle Stevenson	0	1	0	0	2	0	0	X	X	X	

=== Draw 5 ===
Thursday, February 7th at 7pm

Sheet 1	1	2	3	4	5	6	7	8	9	10	Final
Tim Cullen 🔨	0	0	2	1	0	0	2	0	1	1	7
Ted MacFadyen	1	0	0	0	1	1	0	1	0	0	4

Sheet 2	1	2	3	4	5	6	7	8	9	10	Final
John Likely 🔨	1	0	1	0	3	0	0	2	0	2	9
Robert Shaw	0	1	0	1	0	1	2	0	1	0	6

Sheet 3	1	2	3	4	5	6	7	8	9	10	Final
Kyle Stevenson 🔨	0	0	2	1	0	0	0	X	X	X	3
Rod MacDonald	2	1	0	0	2	2	2	X	X	X	9

Sheet 4	1	2	3	4	5	6	7	8	9	10	Final
Peter Gallant 🔨	0	0	2	2	0	0	1	0	0	2	7
Eddie MacKenzie	1	1	0	0	2	0	0	2	0	0	6

=== Draw 6 ===
Friday, February 8th at 2 pm

Sheet 1	1	2	3	4	5	6	7	8	9	10	Final
Eddie MacKenzie 🔨	2	0	0	0	1	X	X	X	X	X	3
Rod MacDonald	0	2	3	0	0	X	X	X	X	X	5

Sheet 2	1	2	3	4	5	6	7	8	9	10	Final
Peter Gallant 🔨	0	1	0	0	0	3	1	0	1	0	6
Kyle Stevenson	0	0	1	1	3	0	0	1	0	1	7

Sheet 3	1	2	3	4	5	6	7	8	9	10	Final
Robert Shaw 🔨	2	0	0	0	1	0	1	0	1	1	6
Tim Cullen	0	1	1	0	0	0	0	1	0	0	3

Sheet 4	1	2	3	4	5	6	7	8	9	10	Final
John Likely 🔨	2	0	0	0	1	0	1	0	0	2	6
Ted MacFadyen	0	1	0	0	0	0	0	1	1	0	3

=== Draw 7 ===
Friday, February 8th at 7 pm

Sheet 1	1	2	3	4	5	6	7	8	9	10	Final
Ted MacFadyen 🔨	2	0	0	2	3	0	0	0	1	0	8
Robert Shaw	0	1	1	0	0	2	1	3	0	1	9

Sheet 2	1	2	3	4	5	6	7	8	9	10	Final
Tim Cullen 🔨	0	2	0	0	1	1	0	3	0	1	8
Eddie MacKenzie	1	0	2	1	0	0	1	0	2	0	7

Sheet 3	1	2	3	4	5	6	7	8	9	10	Final
Kyle Stevenson 🔨	0	4	0	1	0	X	X	X	X	X	5
Eddie MacKenzie	1	0	1	0	1	X	X	X	X	X	3

Sheet 4	1	2	3	4	5	6	7	8	9	10	Final
Rod MacDonald 🔨	2	0	2	1	3	X	X	X	X	X	
Peter Gallant	0	0	0	0	0	X	X	X	X	X	

== Playoffs round ==
Page playoff system
1	John Likely	5
2	Peter Gallant	6
3	Rod MacDonald	3
4	Kyle Stevenson	10

Semifinal
2	John Likely	10
4	Kyle Stevenson	5

Final
2	Peter Gallant	8
1	John Likely	7

=== Tiebreaker ===
Saturday, February 9th at 2 pm

Sheet 3	1	2	3	4	5	6	7	8	9	10	Final
Kyle Stevenson	0	2	0	0	3	1	3	0	0	X	9
Robert Shaw 🔨	2	0	2	1	0	0	0	1	0	X	6

=== Round robin playoff ===
Saturday, February 9th at 7 pm

Sheet 2: Page 3 vs 4	1	2	3	4	5	6	7	8	9	10	Final
Kyle Stevenson	0	3	0	0	2	2	1	2	X	X	10
Rod MacDonald	2	0	1	0	0	0	0	0	X	X	3

Sheet 3: Page 1 vs 2	1	2	3	4	5	6	7	8	9	10	Final
John Likely 🔨	1	0	0	1	0	2	0	0	1	0	5
Peter Gallant	0	1	0	0	2	0	0	2	0	1	6

=== Semi final ===
Sunday, February 10th at 10 am

Sheet 2	1	2	3	4	5	6	7	8	9	10	Final
John Likely🔨	0	2	0	2	0	3	1	2	X	X	10
Kyle Stevenson	2	0	2	0	1	0	0	0	X	X	5

=== Final ===
Sunday, February 10th at 3 pm

Sheet 3	1	2	3	4	5	6	7	8	9	10	11	Final
John Likely 🔨	2	0	0	1	1	1	0	0	0	2	0	7
Peter Gallant	0	0	2	0	0	0	2	1	2	0	1	8
