= 2011 PEI Labatt Tankard =

- Host city: Summerside, Prince Edward Island
- Arena: Silver Fox Curling Club
- Dates: February 3–8
- Winner: Team MacKenzie
- Curling club: Charlottetown CC, Charlottetown, PEI
- Skip: Eddie MacKenzie
- Third: Mike Gaudet
- Second: Mike Dillon
- Lead: Alex MacFadyen
- Finalist: John Likely

The 2011 PEI Labatt Tankard was held February 3–8 at the Silver Fox Curling Club in Summerside, Prince Edward Island. The winning team of Eddie MacKenzie will represent Prince Edward Island at the 2011 Tim Hortons Brier in London, Ontario.

== Teams ==
Skip	Third	Second	Lead	Club(s)
Mel Bernard	Ted MacFadyen	Douglas Simmons	Earle Proude	Silver Fox Curling and Yacht Club, Summerside
Barry Cameron	Leo Stewart	Duane MacNeill	Paul Matheson	Charlottetown Curling Club, Charlottetown
Robert Campbell	Jamie Newson	Tyler MacKenzie	Robbie Doherty	Charlottetown Curling Club, Charlottetown
Kevin Champion	Philip Gorveatt	Stephen Champion	Robert Shaw	Charlottetown Curling Club, Charlottetown
John Desrosiers	Dennis Watts	Jeff Gallant	Matthew Praught	Charlottetown Curling Club, Charlottetown
Tom Fetterly	Sandy MacPhee	Tim Hockin	Terry Arsenault	Silver Fox Curling and Yacht Club, Summerside
Brett Gallant	Peter Gallant (Skip)	Anson Carmody	Jeff Wilson	Charlottetown Curling Club, Charlottetown, Prince Edward Island
Bill Hope	Craig Mackie	John Mullin	David Murphy	Charlottetown Curling Club, Charlottetown
John Likely	Kyle Stevenson	Mark Butler	Doug MacGregor	Charlottetown Curling Club, Charlottetown
Rod MacDonald	Andrew Robinson	Mark O'Rourke	Sean Clarey	Charlottetown Curling Club, Charlottetown, Prince Edward Island
Eddie MacKenzie	Mike Gaudet	Mike Dillon	Alex MacFadyen	Charlottetown Curling Club, Charlottetown
Calvin Smith	Todd Gilbert	Richie Hughes	Adam Arsenault	Charlottetown Curling Club, Charlottetown
Grant Somers	Blair Jay	Gordon MacFadyen	Chuck Jay	Silver Fox Curling and Yacht Club, Summerside
David Ross	Nick Fraser	Paul Gaudet	Jeff Brine	Charlottetown Curling Club, Charlottetown
Rob Warren	Tyler Harris	Eric Brodersen	Chris Hodgson	Charlottetown Curling Club, Charlottetown

== Standings ==
Skip (Club)	W	L
Eddie MacKenzie (Charlottetown Curling Club)	8	1
John Likely (Charlottetown Curling Club)	7	3
Rod MacDonald (Charlottetown Curling Club)	3	3
Rob Warren (Charlottetown Curling Club)	5	3
Peter Gallant (Charlottetown Curling Club)	4	3
Kevin Champion (Charlottetown Curling Club)	3	3
Bill Hope (Charlottetown Curling Club)	3	3
Mel Bernard (Silver Fox Curling Club)	2	3
Robert Campbell (Charlottetown Curling Club)	2	3
Grant Somers (Silver Fox Curling Club)	2	3
Tom Fetterly (Silver Fox Curling Club)	1	3
David Ross (Charlottetown Curling Club)	1	3
Calvin Smith (Charlottetown Curling Club)	1	3
Barry Cameron (Charlottetown Curling Club)	0	3
John Desrosiers (Charlottetown Curling Club)	0	3

== A Event ==
Round of 16
Peter Gallant	11
Tom Fetterly	10
John Desrosiers	4
Calvin Smith	8
Rod MacDonald	7
Barry Cameron	3
John Likely	5
Mel Bernard	8
A5	Eddie MacKenzie	7
A5	Bill Hope	6
A6	Kevin Champion	7
A6	Grant Somers	6
A7	Rob Warren	7
A7	David Ross	3

Quarterfinals
A1	Peter Gallant	9
A2	Calvin Smith	3
A3	Rod MacDonald	7
A4	Mel Bernard	2
A5	Eddie MacKenzie	8
A6	Kevin Champion	4
A8	Robert Campbell	7
A7	Rob Warren	3

Semifinals
A11	Peter Gallant	10
A10	Rod MacDonald	2
A9	Eddie MacKenzie	9
A8	Robert Campbell	6

A Qualifier
A12	Peter Gallant	2
A13	Eddie MacKenzie	8

== B Event ==
B Side (Top half)
A1	Tom Fetterly	8
A2	John Desrosiers	6
A3	Barry Cameron	3
A4	John Likely	11

Semifinals
A11	Mel Bernard	7
B1	Tom Fetterly	6
A10	Calvin Smith	3
B2	John Likely	12

Finals
B4	Mel Bernard	4
B5	John Likely	5

Quarterfinals			Semifinals			B Side (Bottom Half)
			A8	Rob Warren	3
A5	Bill Hope	9	B3	Bill Hope	7
A6	Grant Somers	3				B6	Bill Hope	5
						B7	Kevin Champion	7
			A9	Kevin Champion	7
			A7	David Ross	3

B Side
B8	John Likely	10
A13	Robert Campbell	3
B9	Kevin Champion	8
A12	Rod MacDonald	9

Semifinal
A12	Peter Gallant	6
B10	John Likely	7
A13	Eddie MacKenzie	7
B11	Rod MacDonald	3

Final
B12	John Likely	7
B13	Eddie MacKenzie	8

== C Event ==
Round of 16
John Desrosiers	1
Rob Warren	8
Barry Cameron	7
David Ross	8

Quarterfinals
C1	Rob Warren	8
C2	David Ross	2

Semifinals
B8	Mel Bernard	5
C4	Rob Warren	6

C Side (Top Half)
C6	Rob Warren	7
B11	Kevin Champion	6

Round of 16
Grant Somers	8
Tom Fetterly	6

Quarterfinals
C3	Grant Somers	10
B5	Calvin Smith	5

Semifinals
B9	Bill Hope	7
C5	Grant Somers	5

C Side (Bottom Half)
C7	Bill Hope	7
B10	Robert Campbell	10

C Side
B13	Rod MacDonald	9
C9	Robert Campbell	3
B12	Peter Gallant	9
C8	Rob Warren	3

Semifinal
B12	John Likely	10
C10	Rod MacDonald	9
B13	Eddie MacKenzie	9
C11	Peter Gallant	7

Final
C12	John Likely	9
C13	Eddie MacKenzie	1

== Playoffs ==
Championship 1			Championship 2
			1	Eddie MacKenzie
1	Eddie MacKenzie	8	1	Eddie MacKenzie
2	John Likely	6

=== Championship Round 1 ===
February 8, 2:00 PM

Sheet 4	1	2	3	4	5	6	7	8	9	10	Final
Eddie MacKenzie 🔨	1	0	0	1	0	2	2	1	0	1	8
John Likely	0	0	2	0	3	0	0	0	1	0	6

=== Championship Round 2 ===
February 8, 7:00 PM

Sheet 3	1	2	3	4	5	6	7	8	9	10	Final
Eddie MacKenzie	0	0	0	0	0	0	0	0	0	0	0
Eddie MacKenzie	0	0	0	0	0	0	0	0	0	0	0
