= 2007 Tim Hortons Brier =

- Host city: Hamilton, Ontario
- Arena: Copps Coliseum
- Dates: March 3–11
- Attendance: 107,199
- Winner: Ontario
- Curling club: Coldwater & District Curling Club, Coldwater
- Skip: Glenn Howard
- Third: Richard Hart
- Second: Brent Laing
- Lead: Craig Savill
- Alternate: Steve Bice
- Coach: Scott Taylor
- Finalist: Newfoundland and Labrador (Brad Gushue)

The 2007 Tim Hortons Brier, Canada's men's curling championship, was held from March 3 to 11 at Copps Coliseum in Hamilton, Ontario. After losing in the final the previous season, Team Ontario skipped by Glenn Howard defeated 2006 Olympic gold medalist Brad Gushue and his Newfoundland and Labrador team in the final.

== Teams ==
Alberta	British Columbia	Manitoba
Saville SC, Edmonton Skip: Kevin Martin; Third: John Morris; Second: Marc Kennedy; Lead: Ben Hebert; Alternate: Blayne Iskiw	Victoria CC, Victoria Skip: Dean Joanisse; Third: Mike Wood; Second: Dave Nantes; Lead: Chris Atchison; Alternate: Jay Tuson	Charleswood CC, Winnipeg Skip: Jeff Stoughton; Third: Ryan Fry; Second: Rob Fowler; Lead: Steve Gould; Alternate: Randy Dutiaume
New Brunswick	Newfoundland and Labrador	Northern Ontario
Thistle St. Andrews CC, Saint John Skip: Paul Dobson; Third: Scott Jones; Second: Ryan Porter; Lead: Pierre Fraser; Alternate: Mark Dobson	Corner Brook CA, Corner Brook Skip: Brad Gushue; Third: Mark Nichols; Second: Chris Schille; Lead: Jamie Korab; Alternate: Jeff Thomas	Soo Curlers CC, Sault Ste. Marie Fourth: Brad Jacobs; Skip: Al Harnden; Second: Dusty Jakomait; Lead: Lee Toner; Alternate: Rob Thomas
Nova Scotia	Ontario	Prince Edward Island
Windsor CC, Windsor Skip: Mark Kehoe; Third: Curt Palmer; Second: Doug Bryant; Lead: Richard Barker; Alternate: Donnie Smith	Coldwater & District CC, Coldwater Skip: Glenn Howard; Third: Richard Hart; Second: Brent Laing; Lead: Craig Savill; Alternate: Steve Bice	Charlottetown CC, Charlottetown Skip: Peter Gallant; Third: Kevin Champion; Second: Mark O'Rourke; Lead: Robert Campbell; Alternate: Rod MacDonald
Quebec	Saskatchewan	Yukon/Northwest Territories
CC du Cap, Cap-de-la-Madeleine Fourth: Martin Ferland; Skip: Pierre Charette; Second: Philippe Lemay; Lead: Marco Berthelot; Alternate: Michel Ferland	Davidson CC, Davidson Skip: Pat Simmons; Third: Jeff Sharp; Second: Gerry Adam; Lead: Steve Laycock; Alternate: Brian McCusker	Yellowknife CC, Yellowknife Skip: Jamie Koe; Third: Kevin Whitehead; Second: Mark Whitehead; Lead: Brad Chorostkowski; Alternate: Randy Turpin

== Map of teams ==
Provincial Winners

== Round-robin standings ==
Final round-robin standings

Key
Teams to Playoffs

Locale	Skip	W	L	PF	PA	EW	EL	BE	SE	S%
Ontario	Glenn Howard	10	1	90	52	53	39	6	20	85%
Newfoundland and Labrador	Brad Gushue	8	3	82	66	52	41	14	16	81%
Manitoba	Jeff Stoughton	8	3	76	61	45	45	12	11	85%
Alberta	Kevin Martin	8	3	81	65	46	45	13	9	87%
Saskatchewan	Pat Simmons	7	4	84	67	47	46	8	10	83%
Northern Ontario	Al Harnden	5	6	74	77	47	49	9	11	77%
Northwest Territories/Yukon	Jamie Koe	5	6	55	70	36	40	12	8	80%
British Columbia	Dean Joanisse	4	7	71	75	48	43	10	14	78%
Quebec	Pierre Charette	4	7	64	82	40	49	11	8	81%
Prince Edward Island	Peter Gallant	4	7	63	74	45	49	8	9	81%
Nova Scotia	Mark Kehoe	2	9	67	82	45	47	13	7	78
New Brunswick	Paul Dobson	1	10	52	88	36	47	12	5	76

== Round-robin results ==
=== Draw 1 ===
Saturday, March 3, 14:30

Sheet A	1	2	3	4	5	6	7	8	9	10	Final
Quebec (Charette) 🔨	1	2	1	0	1	1	0	2	0	X	8
Saskatchewan (Simmons)	0	0	0	1	0	0	4	0	1	X	6

Sheet B	1	2	3	4	5	6	7	8	9	10	Final
Nova Scotia (Kehoe) 🔨	1	0	2	0	0	1	0	2	0	X	6
Ontario (Howard)	0	2	0	1	1	0	4	0	3	X	11

Sheet C	1	2	3	4	5	6	7	8	9	10	Final
British Columbia (Joanisse) 🔨	0	0	1	1	0	0	1	0	2	0	5
Alberta (Martin)	2	0	0	0	3	0	0	0	0	1	6

Sheet D	1	2	3	4	5	6	7	8	9	10	Final
New Brunswick (Dobson)	0	0	1	0	0	0	0	0	2	X	3
Northwest Territories/Yukon (Koe) 🔨	2	1	0	0	1	0	0	2	0	X	6

=== Draw 2 ===
Saturday, March 3, 19:00

Sheet A	1	2	3	4	5	6	7	8	9	10	Final
Alberta (Martin) 🔨	3	2	0	3	0	2	X	X	X	X	10
New Brunswick (Dobson)	0	0	2	0	1	0	X	X	X	X	3

Sheet B	1	2	3	4	5	6	7	8	9	10	Final
Newfoundland and Labrador (Gushue) 🔨	1	0	1	0	0	1	0	1	0	X	4
Manitoba (Stoughton)	0	1	0	0	1	0	3	0	1	X	6

Sheet C	1	2	3	4	5	6	7	8	9	10	11	Final
Prince Edward Island (Gallant) 🔨	2	0	1	0	0	2	0	0	2	0	1	8
Northern Ontario (Harnden)	0	2	0	2	1	0	1	0	0	1	0	7

Sheet D	1	2	3	4	5	6	7	8	9	10	Final
Quebec (Charette) 🔨	1	0	0	2	0	1	0	0	1	0	5
Ontario (Howard)	0	0	1	0	2	0	1	3	0	1	8

=== Draw 3 ===
Sunday, March 4, 9:00

Sheet B	1	2	3	4	5	6	7	8	9	10	Final
Prince Edward Island (Gallant) 🔨	1	0	1	0	1	0	0	1	0	0	4
British Columbia (Joanisse)	0	1	0	1	0	0	1	0	2	1	6

Sheet C	1	2	3	4	5	6	7	8	9	10	Final
Northwest Territories/Yukon (Koe) 🔨	2	1	1	0	2	0	0	4	X	X	10
Quebec (Charette)	0	0	0	2	0	1	1	0	X	X	4

=== Draw 4 ===
Sunday, March 4, 14:30

Sheet A	1	2	3	4	5	6	7	8	9	10	Final
Newfoundland and Labrador (Gushue) 🔨	0	2	2	0	0	2	0	2	X	X	8
Prince Edward Island (Gallant)	1	0	0	0	1	0	0	0	X	X	2

Sheet B	1	2	3	4	5	6	7	8	9	10	Final
Northern Ontario (Harnden) 🔨	1	0	1	0	0	3	1	0	2	X	8
Alberta (Martin)	0	1	0	0	1	0	0	2	0	X	4

Sheet C	1	2	3	4	5	6	7	8	9	10	11	Final
Ontario (Howard) 🔨	1	0	3	1	0	0	0	1	0	1	2	9
Manitoba (Stoughton)	0	1	0	0	3	1	0	0	2	0	0	7

Sheet D	1	2	3	4	5	6	7	8	9	10	Final
Saskatchewan (Simmons) 🔨	1	0	1	0	3	0	2	0	0	X	7
Nova Scotia (Kehoe)	0	1	0	2	0	2	0	0	0	X	5

=== Draw 5 ===
Sunday, March 4, 19:00

Sheet A	1	2	3	4	5	6	7	8	9	10	Final
British Columbia (Joanisse) 🔨	1	0	1	0	0	2	0	0	1	X	5
Northwest Territories/Yukon (Koe)	0	2	0	1	2	0	3	0	0	X	8

Sheet B	1	2	3	4	5	6	7	8	9	10	Final
New Brunswick (Dobson) 🔨	0	0	1	0	2	0	0	0	1	1	5
Saskatchewan (Simmons)	1	1	0	3	0	0	1	0	0	0	6

Sheet C	1	2	3	4	5	6	7	8	9	10	Final
Nova Scotia (Kehoe) 🔨	0	0	2	0	2	0	2	2	0	X	8
Newfoundland and Labrador (Gushue)	0	0	0	1	0	2	0	0	2	X	5

Sheet D	1	2	3	4	5	6	7	8	9	10	Final
Manitoba (Stoughton) 🔨	2	0	1	0	0	3	0	0	0	X	6
Northern Ontario (Harnden)	0	1	0	1	2	0	1	0	0	X	5

=== Draw 6 ===
Monday, March 5, 9:00

Sheet A	1	2	3	4	5	6	7	8	9	10	Final
Saskatchewan (Simmons) 🔨	1	0	1	0	2	0	0	2	0	3	9
Alberta (Martin)	0	3	0	1	0	2	0	0	1	0	7

Sheet B	1	2	3	4	5	6	7	8	9	10	11	Final
Ontario (Howard)	0	3	0	2	0	0	0	1	0	0	4	10
Newfoundland and Labrador (Gushue)	0	0	1	0	0	1	1	0	2	1	0	6

Sheet C	1	2	3	4	5	6	7	8	9	10	Final
Northern Ontario (Harnden) 🔨	0	1	2	0	0	2	0	0	0	X	5
British Columbia (Joanisse)	1	0	0	2	2	0	3	1	1	X	10

Sheet D	1	2	3	4	5	6	7	8	9	10	Final
Northwest Territories/Yukon (Koe) 🔨	0	1	0	2	0	2	1	0	1	X	7
Prince Edward Island (Gallant)	0	0	1	0	1	0	0	1	0	X	3

=== Draw 7 ===
Monday, March 5, 14:30

Sheet A	1	2	3	4	5	6	7	8	9	10	Final
Prince Edward Island (Gallant) 🔨	2	0	0	1	0	2	1	0	1	X	7
Quebec (Charette)	0	3	1	0	2	0	0	2	0	X	8

Sheet B	1	2	3	4	5	6	7	8	9	10	Final
Manitoba (Stoughton) 🔨	1	0	1	0	5	0	X	X	X	X	7
Northwest Territories/Yukon (Koe)	0	0	0	0	0	1	X	X	X	X	1

Sheet C	1	2	3	4	5	6	7	8	9	10	Final
Alberta (Martin) 🔨	0	0	1	1	1	0	2	1	0	1	7
Ontario (Howard)	2	1	0	0	0	1	0	0	1	0	5

Sheet D	1	2	3	4	5	6	7	8	9	10	Final
Nova Scotia (Kehoe) 🔨	0	1	2	0	2	0	2	0	2	X	9
New Brunswick (Dobson)	0	0	0	3	0	1	0	2	0	X	6

=== Draw 8 ===
Monday, March 5, 19:30

Sheet A	1	2	3	4	5	6	7	8	9	10	Final
New Brunswick (Dobson) 🔨	1	0	0	1	0	1	1	0	2	0	6
Northern Ontario (Harnden)	0	1	2	0	1	0	0	1	0	2	7

Sheet B	1	2	3	4	5	6	7	8	9	10	Final
British Columbia (Joanisse) 🔨	1	0	1	0	0	3	0	1	0	X	6
Nova Scotia (Kehoe)	0	1	0	1	0	0	0	0	2	X	4

Sheet C	1	2	3	4	5	6	7	8	9	10	Final
Quebec (Charette) 🔨	0	0	1	0	0	0	1	0	2	X	4
Manitoba (Stoughton)	2	1	0	2	0	0	0	1	0	X	6

Sheet D	1	2	3	4	5	6	7	8	9	10	11	Final
Newfoundland and Labrador (Gushue) 🔨	2	0	0	1	1	0	0	4	0	0	2	10
Saskatchewan (Simmons)	0	2	1	0	0	2	1	0	0	2	0	8

=== Draw 9 ===
Tuesday, March 6, 9:00

Sheet A	1	2	3	4	5	6	7	8	9	10	Final
Quebec (Charette) 🔨	3	0	2	0	0	2	0	0	0	0	7
Nova Scotia (Kehoe)	0	1	0	0	1	0	0	1	2	1	6

Sheet B	1	2	3	4	5	6	7	8	9	10	Final
Northwest Territories/Yukon (Koe) 🔨	2	0	0	3	0	1	0	0	0	1	7
Northern Ontario (Harnden)	0	2	0	0	2	0	3	0	1	0	8

Sheet C	1	2	3	4	5	6	7	8	9	10	Final
Ontario (Howard)	1	1	0	2	0	1	2	0	1	X	8
Saskatchewan (Simmons)	0	0	2	0	2	0	0	2	0	X	6

Sheet D	1	2	3	4	5	6	7	8	9	10	Final
New Brunswick (Dobson) 🔨	2	0	0	1	0	1	0	1	0	X	5
Manitoba (Stoughton)	0	0	3	0	2	0	3	0	2	X	10

=== Draw 10 ===
Tuesday, March 6, 14:30

Sheet A	1	2	3	4	5	6	7	8	9	10	11	Final
Northern Ontario (Harnden) 🔨	2	0	1	0	2	1	0	1	0	1	0	8
Newfoundland and Labrador (Gushue)	0	4	0	2	0	0	1	0	1	0	2	10

Sheet B	1	2	3	4	5	6	7	8	9	10	11	Final
Nova Scotia (Kehoe) 🔨	2	0	1	0	1	0	0	2	0	2	0	8
Alberta (Martin)	0	2	0	2	0	2	0	0	2	0	1	9

Sheet C	1	2	3	4	5	6	7	8	9	10	Final
Manitoba (Stoughton) 🔨	0	1	2	1	1	0	0	1	0	1	7
Prince Edward Island (Gallant)	1	0	0	0	0	2	1	0	1	0	5

Sheet D	1	2	3	4	5	6	7	8	9	10	Final
Saskatchewan (Simmons) 🔨	1	0	0	2	0	2	0	1	3	X	9
British Columbia (Joanisse)	0	0	1	0	1	0	1	0	0	X	3

=== Draw 11 ===
Tuesday, March 6, 19:30

Sheet A	1	2	3	4	5	6	7	8	9	10	Final
Alberta (Martin) 🔨	1	1	0	2	0	3	3	X	X	X	10
Northwest Territories/Yukon (Koe)	0	0	1	0	1	0	0	X	X	X	2

Sheet B	1	2	3	4	5	6	7	8	9	10	Final
Newfoundland and Labrador (Gushue) 🔨	1	1	0	2	1	1	0	2	X	X	8
Quebec (Charette)	0	0	2	0	0	0	0	0	X	X	2

Sheet C	1	2	3	4	5	6	7	8	9	10	Final
British Columbia (Joanisse) 🔨	1	0	1	0	0	2	0	0	X	X	4
New Brunswick (Dobson)	0	3	0	1	0	0	3	2	X	X	9

Sheet D	1	2	3	4	5	6	7	8	9	10	Final
Prince Edward Island (Gallant) 🔨	1	0	0	2	0	0	1	0	X	X	4
Ontario (Howard)	0	2	1	0	1	1	0	4	X	X	9

=== Draw 12 ===
Wednesday, March 7, 9:00

Sheet A	1	2	3	4	5	6	7	8	9	10	Final
Ontario (Howard) 🔨	2	2	2	4	1	0	X	X	X	X	11
New Brunswick (Dobson)	0	0	0	0	0	1	X	X	X	X	1

Sheet B	1	2	3	4	5	6	7	8	9	10	Final
Saskatchewan (Simmons)	1	0	4	0	2	0	1	0	2	X	10
Manitoba (Stoughton)	0	2	0	1	0	1	0	3	0	X	7

Sheet C	1	2	3	4	5	6	7	8	9	10	Final
Nova Scotia (Kehoe) 🔨	1	0	1	0	3	0	0	0	1	X	6
Northern Ontario (Harnden)	0	4	0	1	0	1	1	3	0	X	10

Sheet D	1	2	3	4	5	6	7	8	9	10	11	Final
Alberta (Martin) 🔨	1	0	0	2	0	2	0	0	0	1	0	6
Newfoundland and Labrador (Gushue)	0	1	1	0	2	0	0	2	0	0	2	8

=== Draw 13 ===
Wednesday, March 7, 14:30

Sheet A	1	2	3	4	5	6	7	8	9	10	Final
Manitoba (Stoughton) 🔨	1	0	0	2	0	2	3	0	0	X	8
British Columbia (Joanisse)	0	1	2	0	1	0	0	2	1	X	7

Sheet B	1	2	3	4	5	6	7	8	9	10	Final
New Brunswick (Dobson) 🔨	2	0	1	0	0	0	1	0	X	X	4
Prince Edward Island (Gallant)	0	2	0	1	4	0	0	4	X	X	11

Sheet C	1	2	3	4	5	6	7	8	9	10	Final
Newfoundland and Labrador (Gushue) 🔨	3	1	1	0	1	0	0	1	X	X	7
Northwest Territories/Yukon (Koe)	0	0	0	0	0	1	1	0	X	X	2

Sheet D	1	2	3	4	5	6	7	8	9	10	Final
Northern Ontario (Harnden) 🔨	3	0	1	0	0	2	0	2	0	X	8
Quebec (Charette)	0	0	0	2	3	0	1	0	0	X	6

=== Draw 14 ===
Wednesday, March 7, 19:00

Sheet A	1	2	3	4	5	6	7	8	9	10	Final
Prince Edward Island (Gallant) 🔨	0	1	0	1	0	2	0	1	1	1	7
Saskatchewan (Simmons)	0	0	1	0	1	0	2	0	0	0	4

Sheet B	1	2	3	4	5	6	7	8	9	10	Final
British Columbia (Joanisse) 🔨	0	1	0	0	0	2	0	1	1	X	5
Ontario (Howard)	1	0	2	0	2	0	1	0	0	X	6

Sheet C	1	2	3	4	5	6	7	8	9	10	Final
Quebec (Charette) 🔨	0	0	1	0	1	0	1	0	2	1	6
Alberta (Martin)	0	0	0	2	0	2	0	3	0	0	7

Sheet D	1	2	3	4	5	6	7	8	9	10	Final
Northwest Territories/Yukon (Koe) 🔨	0	1	1	0	1	0	0	3	0	2	8
Nova Scotia (Kehoe)	0	0	0	1	0	2	0	0	2	0	5

=== Draw 15 ===
Thursday, March 8, 9:00

Sheet A	1	2	3	4	5	6	7	8	9	10	Final
Nova Scotia (Kehoe) 🔨	1	0	0	1	1	0	0	1	0	0	4
Manitoba (Stoughton)	0	2	1	0	0	1	0	0	1	1	6

Sheet B	1	2	3	4	5	6	7	8	9	10	Final
Alberta (Martin) 🔨	2	1	0	0	0	1	0	4	0	X	8
Prince Edward Island (Gallant)	0	0	1	1	0	0	2	0	1	X	5

Sheet C	1	2	3	4	5	6	7	8	9	10	Final
New Brunswick (Dobson) 🔨	1	0	1	0	1	0	0	0	1	0	4
Newfoundland and Labrador (Gushue)	0	1	0	0	0	1	2	0	0	1	5

Sheet D	1	2	3	4	5	6	7	8	9	10	Final
British Columbia (Joanisse) 🔨	4	0	2	0	1	2	0	1	X	X	10
Quebec (Charette)	0	1	0	2	0	0	2	0	X	X	5

=== Draw 16 ===
Thursday, March 8, 14:30

Sheet A	1	2	3	4	5	6	7	8	9	10	11	Final
Newfoundland and Labrador (Gushue) 🔨	0	2	1	0	0	2	0	3	0	2	1	11
British Columbia (Joanisse)	1	0	0	1	1	0	4	0	3	0	0	10

Sheet B	1	2	3	4	5	6	7	8	9	10	Final
Quebec (Charette) 🔨	3	0	0	1	1	0	3	0	0	1	9
New Brunswick (Dobson)	0	0	1	0	0	1	0	3	1	0	6

Sheet C	1	2	3	4	5	6	7	8	9	10	Final
Saskatchewan (Simmons) 🔨	3	0	4	2	0	2	X	X	X	X	11
Northwest Territories/Yukon (Koe)	0	1	0	0	1	0	X	X	X	X	2

Sheet D	1	2	3	4	5	6	7	8	9	10	Final
Ontario (Howard) 🔨	0	2	1	0	1	0	0	1	1	X	6
Northern Ontario (Harnden)	1	0	0	1	0	0	1	0	0	X	3

=== Draw 17 ===
Thursday, March 8, 19:30

Sheet A	1	2	3	4	5	6	7	8	9	10	Final
Northwest Territories/Yukon (Koe) 🔨	0	1	0	0	1	0	X	X	X	X	2
Ontario (Howard)	1	0	1	1	0	4	X	X	X	X	7

Sheet B	1	2	3	4	5	6	7	8	9	10	Final
Northern Ontario (Harnden) 🔨	0	0	0	0	2	0	2	0	1	X	5
Saskatchewan (Simmons)	2	1	1	1	0	1	0	2	0	X	8

Sheet C	1	2	3	4	5	6	7	8	9	10	Final
Prince Edward Island (Gallant) 🔨	1	0	0	0	2	2	0	1	0	1	7
Nova Scotia (Kehoe)	0	1	1	1	0	0	1	0	2	0	6

Sheet D	1	2	3	4	5	6	7	8	9	10	11	Final
Manitoba (Stoughton) 🔨	2	0	2	0	1	0	0	0	0	1	0	6
Alberta (Martin)	0	1	0	2	0	1	0	0	2	0	1	7

== Playoffs ==
The Page playoff system is used at the Brier. The top four teams with the best records at the end of round-robin play meet in the playoff rounds. The first and second place teams play each other, with the winner advancing directly to the final. The winner of the other page playoff game between the third and fourth place teams plays the loser of the first/second playoff game in the semi-final. The winner of the semi-final moves on to the final.

Page playoffs
1	Ontario	6
2	Newfoundland and Labrador	7
3	Manitoba	6
4	Alberta	3

Semifinal
1	Ontario	8
3	Manitoba	4

Final
2	Newfoundland and Labrador	6
1	Ontario	10

=== 3 vs. 4 ===
Friday, March 9, 14:30

Sheet C	1	2	3	4	5	6	7	8	9	10	Final
Manitoba (Stoughton) 🔨	1	0	0	1	0	0	1	0	3	X	6
Alberta (Martin)	0	1	0	0	1	0	0	1	0	X	3

Player percentages
Manitoba		Alberta	
Steve Gould	94%	Ben Hebert	88%
Rob Fowler	96%	Marc Kennedy	84%
Ryan Fry	81%	John Morris	88%
Jeff Stoughton	86%	Kevin Martin	64%
Total	89%	Total	81%

=== 1 vs. 2 ===
Friday, March 9, 19:30

Sheet C	1	2	3	4	5	6	7	8	9	10	Final
Ontario (Howard) 🔨	0	0	1	0	1	1	0	0	2	1	6
Newfoundland and Labrador (Gushue)	1	3	0	1	0	0	2	0	0	0	7

Player percentages
Ontario		Newfoundland and Labrador	
Craig Savill	93%	Jamie Korab	85%
Brent Laing	79%	Chris Schille	94%
Richard Hart	88%	Mark Nichols	88%
Glenn Howard	75%	Brad Gushue	83%
Total	83%	Total	87%

=== Semifinal ===
Saturday, March 10, 14:30

Sheet C	1	2	3	4	5	6	7	8	9	10	Final
Ontario (Howard) 🔨	2	0	2	1	1	0	1	0	1	X	8
Manitoba (Stoughton)	0	2	0	0	0	1	0	1	0	X	4

Player percentages
Ontario		Manitoba	
Craig Savill	88%	Steve Gould	90%
Brent Laing	96%	Rob Fowler	81%
Richard Hart	90%	Ryan Fry	79%
Glenn Howard	83%	Jeff Stoughton	74%
Total	89%	Total	81%

=== Final ===
Sunday, March 11, 16:30

Sheet C	1	2	3	4	5	6	7	8	9	10	Final
Newfoundland and Labrador (Gushue)	0	2	0	2	1	0	0	1	0	X	6
Ontario (Howard) 🔨	1	0	2	0	0	2	2	0	3	X	10

Player percentages
Newfoundland and Labrador		Ontario	
Jamie Korab	90%	Craig Savill	93%
Chris Schille	75%	Brent Laing	89%
Mark Nichols	88%	Richard Hart	93%
Brad Gushue	86%	Glenn Howard	83%
Total	85%	Total	89%

== Statistics ==
=== Top 5 player percentages ===
Round Robin only

Leads	%
(Ontario) Craig Savill	92
(Alberta) Ben Hebert	91
(Quebec) Marco Berthelot	90
(Saskatchewan) Steve Laycock	90
(British Columbia) Chris Atchison	88

Seconds	%
(Alberta) Marc Kennedy	85
(Saskatchewan) Gerry Adam	85
(Manitoba) Rob Fowler	84
(Ontario) Brent Laing	83
(Quebec) Philippe Lemay	82

Thirds	%
(Alberta) John Morris	87
(Manitoba) Ryan Fry	84
(Ontario) Richard Hart	82
(Northwest Territories) Kevin Whitehead	81
(Prince Edward Island) Kevin Champion	81

Skips	%
(Alberta) Kevin Martin	85
(Ontario) Glenn Howard	84
(Manitoba) Jeff Stoughton	84
(Newfoundland and Labrador) Brad Gushue	80
(Saskatchewan) Pat Simmons	79

== Awards and honours ==
All-Star Teams

First Team

- Skip: Glenn Howard (Ontario)
- Third: John Morris (Alberta)
- Second: Marc Kennedy (Alberta)
- Lead: Craig Savill (Ontario)

Second Team

- Skip: Kevin Martin (Alberta)
- Third: Ryan Fry (Manitoba)
- Second: Gerry Adam (Saskatchewan)
- Lead: Ben Hebert (Alberta)

Hec Gervais Most Valuable Player Award

- Glenn Howard (Ontario)

Ross Harstone Award

- Mark Whitehead (Yukon/Northwest Territories)

Scotty Harper Award – Media Award

- Jim Henderson, SWEEP Magazine (first win) – $500 award

Paul McLean Award

- Richard Wells, TSN Director

== Playdowns ==
=== Alberta ===
The 2007 Alberta Kia Cup was held February 5–11 at the Drayton Valley Arena in Drayton Valley.

Group A
Skip	Wins	Losses
Jeff Ginter	3	2
Randy Ferbey	3	2
Don Walchuk	3	2
Leon Moch	2	3
Rob Armitage	2	3
Mark Johnson	2	3

Group B
Skip	Wins	Losses
Kevin Martin	5	0
Kevin Koe	3	2
Adrian Bakker	3	2
Lloyd Hill	2	3
Wade White	2	3
Rob Maksymetz	0	5

Quarter-finals: Ferbey 7-4 Bakker; Koe 9-7 Walchuk
A1 vs B1: Martin 14-2 Ginter
A2 vs B2: Koe 6-3 Ferbey
Semi-final: Koe 6-3 Ginter
Final: Martin 9-7 Koe

=== British Columbia ===
The 2007 BC Men's Provincial Curling Championship was held February 6–11 at the George Preston Recreation Centre in Langley.

Skip	Wins	Losses
Dean Joanisse	6	1
Greg McAulay	5	2
Rick Folk	4	3
Brian Windsor	4	3
Bert Gretzinger	3	4
Tom Buchy	3	4
Wes Craig	2	5
Barry Swain	1	6

Final: Joanisse 8-6 McAulay

=== Manitoba ===
The 2007 Safeway Championship was held February 7–11 at Credit Union Place in Dauphin. The tournament was a double-knock out with a page playoff.

Skip	Wins	Losses
Jeff Stoughton	7	0
Peter Nicholls	7	3
Terry McNamee	6	3
Kerry Burtnyk	5	2
Reid Carruthers	4	2
Don Spriggs	4	2
Randy Dutiaume	3	3
David Bohn	3	3
Brent Scales	3	2
Trevor Loreth	3	2
Mark Franklin	3	2
Graham Freeman	2	2
Kelly Skinner	2	2
Mark Lukowich	2	2
Dave Boehmer	2	2
Randy Neufeld	2	2
Ron Westcott	1	2
Bob Sigurdson	1	2
Ryan Hyde	1	2
Dave Smith	1	2
Rae Hainstock	1	2
Brent Braemer	1	2
Kelly Robertson	1	2
Brian Fowler	1	2
Rob Ramage	0	2
Blair Goethals	0	2
Don Holmes	0	2
Wes Jonasson	0	2
Peter Prokopowich	0	2
Kyle Foster	0	2
Russel Kihn	0	2
Steve Pauls	0	2

=== New Brunswick ===
The 2007 New Brunswick Labatt Tankard was held February 7–11 at Curling Beauséjour Inc. in Moncton.

Skip	Wins	Losses
Paul Dobson	6	1
Russ Howard	6	1
Mike Kennedy	4	3
Rick Perron	4	3
Terry Odishaw	3	4
Robert MacDiarmid	2	5
Tim Comeau	2	5
James Grattan	1	6

3 vs. 4: Kennedy 4-3 Perron
Semi-final: Howard 4-2 Kennedy
Final: Dobson 9-6 Howard

=== Newfoundland and Labrador ===
The 2007 Newfoundland and Labrador Provincial Men's Championship was held February 6–11 at the Gander Curling Club in Gander.

Skip	Wins	Losses
Brad Gushue	8	0
Rick Rowsell	5	3
Trent Skanes	4	4
Ken Peddigrew	4	4
Geoff Cunningham	4	4
Gary Oke	3	5
Alex Smith	3	5
Keith Ryan	3	5
Dean Branton	2	6

Tiebreaker: Peddigrew 8-7 Cunningham; Skanes 9-3 Peddigrew
Semi-final: Skanes 9-4 Rowsell
Final: Gushue 8-4 Skanes

=== Northern Ontario ===
The 2007 Dominion of Canada Northern Ontario Men's Curling Championship was held February 5–11 at the Idylwylde Golf and Country Club in Sudbury.

Skip	Wins	Losses
Tim Phillips	6	2
Al Harnden	6	2
Jeff Zechner	5	3
Brian Fawcett	5	3
Brian Adams, Jr.	4	4
Rob Gordon	3	5
Jamie Mophet	3	5
Tom Armstrong	2	6
Lorne Jackson	2	6

1 vs. 2: Phillips 8-7 Harnden
3 vs. 4: Zechner 7-5 Fawcett
Semi-final: Harnden 8-1 Zechner
Final: Harnden 14-6 Phillips

=== Nova Scotia ===
The 2007 Alexander Keith's Tankard was played February 7–11 at the Halifax Curling Club in Halifax. The tournament format was triple knock-out with a page playoff.

Skip	Wins	Losses
Mark Kehoe	6	0
Shawn Adams	6	3
Mark Dacey	5	3
Chris Sutherland	5	3
Ian Fitzner-LeBlanc	4	3
Brian Rafuse	4	3
Mike Robinson	3	3
Glen MacLeod	3	3
Jamie Murphy	2	3
Brent MacDougall	2	3
Don MacIntosh	2	3
Kevin White	1	3
Kevin Saccary	1	3
Doug MacKenzie	1	3
Steve Ogden	0	3
Aaron Sweeney	0	3

=== Ontario ===
The 2007 TSC Stores Tankard was held February 12–18 at the Sarnia Sports and Entertainment Centre in Sarnia.

Skip	Wins	Losses
Glenn Howard	9	0
Wayne Middaugh	7	2
Greg Balsdon	6	3
John Epping	6	3
Heath McCormick	5	4
Damien Villard	4	5
Jim Lyle	4	5
Bryan Cochrane	2	7
Robert Stafford	1	8
Wayne Warren	1	8

1 vs. 2: Howard 9-2 Middaugh
3 vs. 4: Epping 12-8 Balsdon
Semi-final: Middaugh 9-5 Epping
Final: Howard 9 - 5 Middaugh

=== Prince Edward Island ===
The 2007 PEI Labatt Tankard was held February 6–11 at the Cornwall Curling Club in Cornwall.

Skip	Wins	Losses
Peter Gallant	7	0
John Likely	5	2
Rod MacDonald	5	2
Kyle Stevenson	4	3
Andrew Robinson	3	4
Mel Bernard	2	5
Robert Shaw	1	6
Kevin Ellsworth	1	6

1 vs. 2: Gallant 6-3 Likely
3 vs. 4: MacDonald 6-4 Stevenson
Semi-final: MacDonald 9-8 Likely
Final: Gallant 8-6 MacDonald

=== Quebec ===
The 2007 Quebec Men's Provincial Championship was held February 7–13 at the Colisée Cardin in Sorel-Tracy.

Group A
Skip	Wins	Losses
Jean-Michel Ménard	8	1
Dwayne Fowler	8	1
Simon Dupuis	7	2
Serge Reid	5	4
Pierre Gervais	4	5
Claude Brazeau, Jr.	4	5
Mario Tremblay	3	6
Shawn Fowler	3	6
Maxime Dufresne	2	7
Georges Tardif	1	8

Group B
Skip	Wins	Losses
Pierre Charette	8	1
Robert Desjardins	7	2
François Gagné	6	3
Steeve Gagnon	6	3
Blake Stoughton	4	5
Daniel Bédard	4	5
Mike Kennedy	4	5
Denis Laflamme	3	6
Stéphane Morand	2	7
Roland Bélanger	1	8

A2 vs. B3: Gagné 9-7 D. Fowler
B2 vs. A3: Desjardins 5-3 Dupuis
A1 vs. B1: Charette 8-5 Ménard
Quarter-final: Desjardins 6-5 Gagné
Semi-final: Ménard 9-8 Desjardins
Final: Charette 12-8 Ménard

=== Saskatchewan ===
The 2007 SaskTel Provincial Men's Tankard was held February 7–11 at the Humboldt Arena in Humboldt. The event was a triple knock out with a page playoff.

Skip	Wins	Losses
Pat Simmons	6	0
Eugene Hritzuk	6	3
Brad Heidt	6	3
Randy Bryden	5	3
Joel Jordison	4	3
Bruce Korte	3	3
Al Schick	3	3
Dean Moulding	3	3
Rod Montgomery	2	3
Scott Coghlan	2	3
Bryan Derbowka	2	3
Brian Humble	1	3
Shawn Joyce	1	3
Gerald Shymko	1	3
Darren Camm	0	3
Brent Gedak	0	3

=== Yukon / Northwest Territories ===
The Yukon / Northwest Territories Men's Championship was held February 8–11 at the Yellowknife Curling Club in Yellowknife.

Skip	Wins	Losses
Jamie Koe	5	1
Darcy Moshenko	4	2
Wade Scoffin	3	6
Steve Fraser	0	6

== See also ==
- Final on YouTube
