= Paul Matheson (disambiguation) =

Paul Matheson (born 1947) is a former mayor of Nelson, New Zealand.

Paul Matheson may also refer to:

- Paul Matheson (figure skater), see 1996 Canadian Figure Skating Championships
- Paul Matheson (curler), see 2011 Labatt Tankard

== See also ==
- Paul Mathiesen (disambiguation)
