= Anson Carmody =

Canadian curler (born 1989)

- Curler
- Born: November 29, 1989 (age 36); Summerside, Prince Edward Island

Team
- Curling club: Cornwall CC, Cornwall, PEI
- Skip: John Likely
- Third: Anson Carmody
- Second: Steve Burgess
- Lead: Robbie Doherty
- Alternate: Matthew Nabuurs

Curling career
- Brier: 4 (2013, 2015, 2016, 2019)
- Grand Slam victories: 0
Medal record
Men's curling
Representing Canada
World Junior Curling Championships
Silver medal – second place	2009 Vancouver
Representing Prince Edward Island
Canada Games
Bronze medal – third place	2007 Whitehorse

Anson James Carmody (born November 29, 1989) is a Canadian curler, from Summerside, Prince Edward Island. Until the 2016–2017 season, he threw third stones for the Eddie MacKenzie rink.

== Career ==
As a junior, Carmody played second on the Brett Gallant rink that won five straight provincial junior titles from 2006 to 2010. The team would win the 2009 Canadian Junior Curling Championships and would represent Canada at the 2009 World Junior Curling Championships. At the 2009 World Juniors, the team won a silver medal, losing to Denmark's Rasmus Stjerne in the final. The team also won a bronze medal at the 2007 Canada Winter Games.

After juniors, Carmody, Gallant, and Brett's father Peter Gallant formed a team, with Carmody still throwing second stones, and Peter skipping, and Jeff Wilson at lead. The team played in the 2011 Labatt Tankard (the provincial championship), but failed to make the playoffs. After the season, Peter and Wilson left the team, and were replaced by MacKenzie at third and Alex MacFadyen at lead. The new squad made it all the way to the final of the 2012 PEI Tankard where they lost to Mike Gaudet. Gallant left the team in 2012 to play in Newfoundland with Brad Gushue. MacKenzie took over the team as skip, and Carmody was promoted to third, and MacFadyen at second. Sean Ledgerwood joined the team at lead. The team won the 2013 PEI Tankard, Carmody's first men's provincial title. The team represented Prince Edward Island at the 2013 Tim Hortons Brier, Carmody's first Brier appearance.

In 2011, Carmody, Gallant, sister Erin and Michelle Mackie won the provincial mixed title. The team which was skipped by Gallant (Anson played second) represented Prince Edward Island at the 2012 Canadian Mixed Curling Championship. The team finished the event with an 8–5 record, missing the playoffs.

Carmody has played on the World Curling Tour since 2011 with Gallant (2011-2012) and Eddie MacKenzie (2012–2014). He won the 2011 Challenge Casino de Charlevoix as a member of the Gallant rink.

== Personal life ==
Carmody currently works as a programmer/analyst for Deltaware and is married.
