= Paul Mathiesen =

Paul Mathiesen may refer to:

- Pål Mathiesen (born 1977, also known as Athera), Norwegian musician
- Paul Maitla (1913–1945, birth name Paul Mathiesen), Estonian military commander

== See also ==
- Paul Matheson (disambiguation)
