= Curl PEI =

- Sport: Curling
- Jurisdiction: Provincial
- Membership: 7 curling clubs
- Founded: 1934
- Affiliation: Curling Canada
- Headquarters: Charlottetown

Official website
- www.peicurling.com
- (Canada)

Curl PEI, formerly known as Prince Edward Island Curling Association, is the regional governing body for the sport of curling in Prince Edward Island. As one of 14 regional associations within Curling Canada, the organization runs the provincial championships that determine who represents the province in the national championships.

== Member clubs ==
There are currently six active curling clubs in Curl PEI:

- Western Community Curling Club
- Maple Leaf Curling Club
- Crapaud Community Curling Club
- Cornwall Curling Club
- Montague Curling Club
- Summerside Curling Club

== Provincial championships ==
Each year Curl PEI hosts 13 provincial championship events:

- PEI tankard (men's)
- Prince Edward Island Scotties Tournament of Hearts (women's)
- Seniors
- Masters
- Club
- Mixed
- Stick
- Junior Mixed
- Juniors (U21)
- U18
- U16
- U13
- Mixed Doubles
