= Robbie Doherty =

Canadian curler (born 1988)

- Curler
- Other names: Rob Doherty
- Born: Robert William Doherty; August 6, 1988 (age 38); Charlottetown, Prince Edward Island

Team
- Curling club: Charlottetown CC; Charlottetown, PEI
- Skip: Adam Casey
- Third: Craig Savill
- Second: Steve Burgess
- Lead: Robbie Doherty

Curling career
- Member Association: Prince Edward Island
- Brier: 4 (2015, 2016, 2017, 2019)

Robert William Doherty (born August 6, 1988) is a Canadian curler from Charlottetown, Prince Edward Island. He currently plays lead on Team Adam Casey.

== Curling career ==
Originally from New Brunswick, Doherty won the New Brunswick junior championships in 2009, playing second for the Jon Rennie rink. The team represented New Brunswick at the 2009 Canadian Junior Curling Championships, finishing with a 7–5 record.

After juniors, Doherty moved to Prince Edward Island. He won the P.E.I. mixed title in 2010, playing second on a team skipped by Robert Campbell. The team represented the island province at the 2011 Canadian Mixed Curling Championship, which the team won. They won the P.E.I. mixed title again in 2012. They team had less success at the 2013 Canadian Mixed Curling Championship, finishing with a 5–6 record.

In men's curling, Doherty joined the Robert Campbell after moving to P.E.I, throwing lead stones on the team. Doherty played in his first provincial championship at the 2010 PEI Labatt Tankard. The team went all the way to the final before losing to Rod MacDonald. The team played in the 2011 PEI Labatt Tankard as well, but missed the playoffs.

For the 2011–12 season, Doherty played for the Halifax, Nova Scotia-based Ian Fitzner-Leblanc rink, playing second. The team played in the 2012 Nova Scotia Men's Molson Provincial Championship, finishing 4th place.

Doherty later returned to P.E.I., teaming up with Blair Jay, throwing second stones. The team played in the 2014 PEI Tankard, where they lost in the semi-final. In 2014, Doherty joined the Casey rink, throwing lead stones. The team entered several events on the World Curling Tour, including two Grand Slam events, the 2014 National and the 2014 Canadian Open, missing the playoffs in both events. The team won the 2015 PEI Tankard, and would go on to represent the island at the 2015 Tim Hortons Brier, Doherty's first.

== Personal life ==
Doherty works as an operations manager for the Grand Slam of Curling. He coached team PEI at the 2019 Canadian Junior Curling Championships. He is married.
