= Peter Gallant =

Canadian curler

- Curler
- Born: December 20, 1958 (age 67); Charlottetown, Prince Edward Island, Canada

Team
- Curling club: Charlottetown CC, Charlottetown, PEI

Curling career
- Brier: 9 (1982, 1991, 1993, 1995, 1997, 1999, 2001, 2007, 2008)

Peter J. Gallant (born December 20, 1958) is a Canadian curler from Charlottetown, Prince Edward Island. He is the father of the 2017 Brier and World Champion Brett Gallant, and Christopher Gallant, a former PEI junior champion and 2014 Canadian University Champion.

== Curling career ==
Gallant has played in nine Briers. In 1982, he played second for Peter Jenkins. Gallant would not make it to the Brier again until 1991 when he played third for Robert Campbell. He played third for Campbell again in 1993, 1995, 1997 and 1999. He played third for Peter MacDonald at the 2001 Nokia Brier. Gallant did not return to the Brier until 2007, where he skipped team Prince Edward Island for the first time at a Brier. He also skipped PEI again the following year at the 2008 Brier in Winnipeg.

Gallant has had some success at the Brier, his best performance coming in 1995 where his team lost in the tie-breaker against Ed Werenich. Gallant was the top shooting third at that Brier and received an all-star award. He has had more success at the Canadian Mixed Curling Championships, appearing in 1982, finishing 3rd; 1986; 1987 which he won as a skip with an 11–1 record and was all star skip. He also skipped PEI in 1991 in Thunder Bay. Gallant has also played in the Canadian Senior Curling Championship in 2010 in Ottawa. He played third for Rod MacDonald where the team finished at 5–6. Gallant won an award for all star third.

Gallant has coached in three Canadian Juniors: 2009 where he won Gold and World Silver with PEI skip Brett Gallant, 2010 with Brett Gallant, and 2012 with PEI skip Christopher Gallant. He has coached at the Brier on three occasions: 2012 with PEI (Mike Gaudet); 2013 & 2014 with Newfoundland (Brad Gushue). He has also coached at the Scottie's on three occasions: 2013 with PEI (Suzanne Birt); 2014 with Nova Scotia (Heather Smith); 2026 with PEI (Amanda Power).

In January, 2016 Gallant began coaching a South Korean women's curling team skipped by Kim Eun-jung. He became the national team coach after Kim's team won the Korean National Championships in April, 2016 in Uiseong, South Korea.

In 2020, he was inducted into the PEI Sports Hall of Fame.

== Personal life ==
Gallant is married and has two children, curlers Brett and Chris Gallant. He is employed as a performance director for Curl PEI and as a coach by the Korean Curling Federation.

He is a retired Operations Manager for Irving Oil.
