= Cornwall Curling Club =

Coordinates: 46°13′51″N 63°13′2″W

- Location: 29 Cornwall Rd. Cornwall, Prince Edward Island, Canada

Information
- Established: 1982
- Club type: Dedicated Ice
- Curling Canada region: Curl PEI
- Sheets of ice: Four
- Rock colours: Blue and Red
- Website: http://cornwallcurling.com/

The Cornwall Curling Club is a curling club in Cornwall, Prince Edward Island, Canada.

== History ==
The Cornwall Village Council decided in 1979 to build a curling rink in the community, and construction began in 1981. The club officially opened in January 1982. Despite a number of hiccups in its first season, it did not take long for the club to produce a provincial champion. Nancy Coffin, Sharon Cole, Pam Sherren, and Heather Worth won the 1983 Prince Edward Island Junior Women's curling championship.

== Champions ==
In addition to winning the 1983 provincial women's junior championships, the club has won several other provincial titles. The club won its first national championship when Lisa Jackson, Carolyn Coulson, Melissa Morrow and Jodi Murphy won the 2015 Travelers Curling Club Championship.

The club won its first PEI Tankard in 2020 when Bryan Cochrane won the title.
