= Cornwall, Prince Edward Island =

Cornwall
- Town
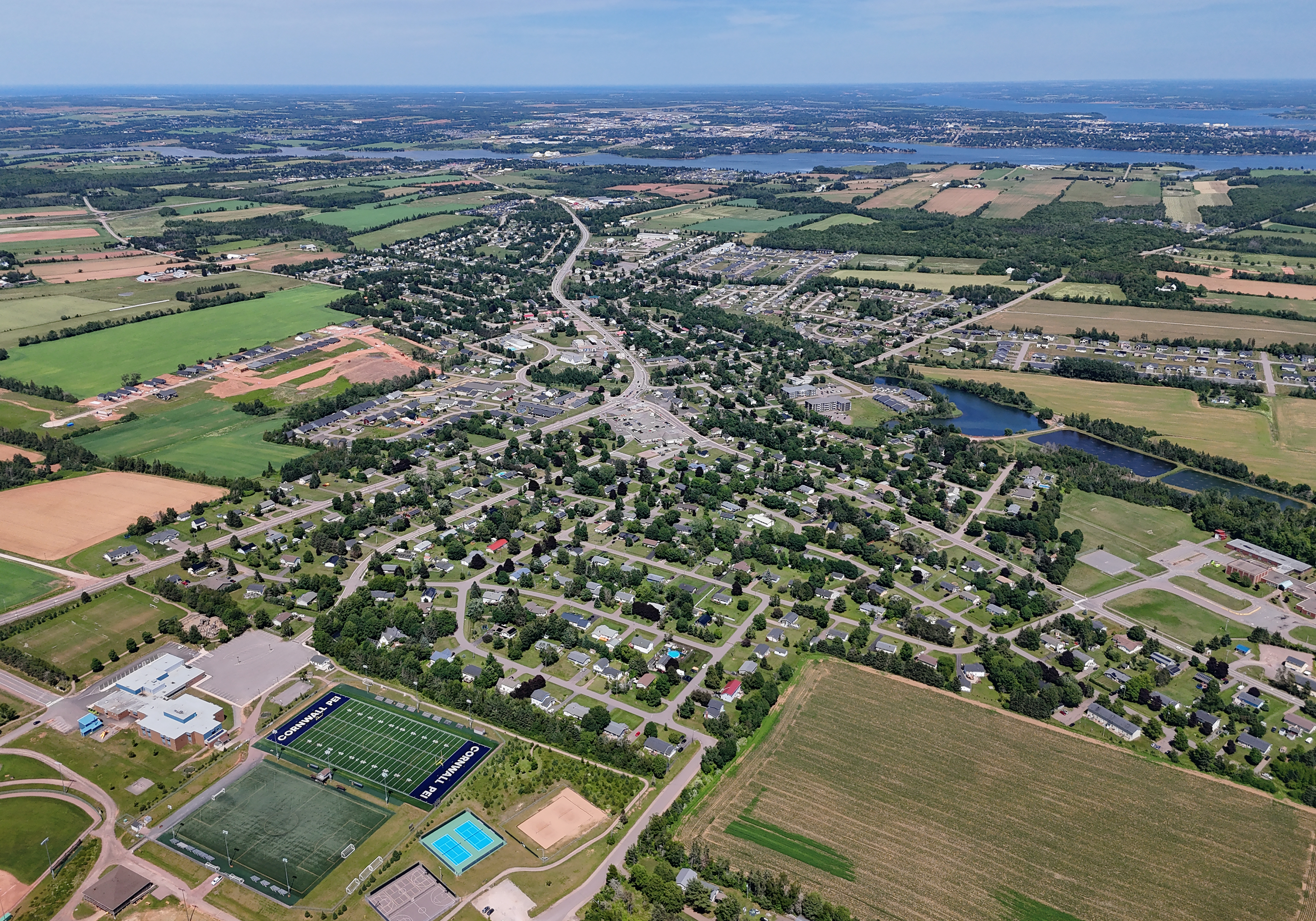
- Aerial view

- Seal

- Cornwall in Prince Edward Island
- Coordinates: 46.23068°N 63.21735°W
- Country: Canada
- Province: Prince Edward Island
- County: Queens County
- Founded: mid-18th century
- Incorporated Village: 1966
- Incorporated Town: April 1, 1995

Government
  - Type: Town Council
  - Mayor: Minerva McCourt
  - Deputy Mayor: Cory Stevenson
  - Councillors: Elaine Barnes, Corey Frizzell, Jill MacIsaac, Shane McGuigan, Judy Herlihy
  - CAO: Kevin McCarville

Area
  - Land: 28.21 km^{2} (10.89 sq mi)
- Elevation: 27 m (89 ft)

Population (2021)
  - Total: 6,574
  - Density: 233/km^{2} (600/sq mi)
  - Change (2016-21): ▲22.9%
  - Dwellings: 2,770
- Time zone: UTC-4 (Atlantic (AST))
  - Summer (DST): UTC-3 (ADT)
- Canadian Postal code: C0A 1H0 & C0A 3H0
- Area code: 902
- Telephone Exchange: 566
- NTS Map: 11L3 Charlottetown
- GNBC Code: BADWZ
- Website: https://cornwallpe.ca/

Cornwall is a Canadian town located in Queens County, Prince Edward Island. The town is located immediately west of the provincial capital Charlottetown.

== History ==
The community of Cornwall traces its history to European settlement in the 18th century and was a predominantly farming community until the construction of Route 1, the Trans-Canada Highway, during the early 1910s. Several subdivisions were created near the intersection of the new highway with the Meadowbank Road, along with a small commercial strip.

On April 1, 1995, the incorporated communities of Cornwall, Eliot River, and North River amalgamated to form the Town of Cornwall.

The amalgamation did not see many controversies. Although the legislation designated the new town as Charlottetown West, amid the call of some residents for a new community name, as was occurring in the case of Stratford (also amalgamated at the same time as Charlottetown South), the community decided to rename the town Cornwall once again.

== Demographics ==
Federal census population history of Cornwall
Year	Pop.	±%
1971	657	—
1976	1,256	+91.2%
1981	1,838	+46.3%
1986	1,894	+3.0%
1991	2,038	+7.6%
1996	4,291	+110.5%
2001	4,412	+2.8%
2006	4,677	+6.0%
2011	5,162	+10.4%
2016	5,348	+3.6%
2021	6,574	+22.9%
Source: Statistics Canada

In the 2021 Census of Population conducted by Statistics Canada, Cornwall had a population of 6,574 living in 2,642 of its 2,770 total private dwellings, a change of 22.9% from its 2016 population of 5,348. With a land area of 28.21 km^{2} (10.89 sq mi), it had a population density of 233.0/km^{2} (603.6/sq mi) in 2021.

== Education ==
The town of Cornwall is home to three English Language School Board schools:

- Westwood Primary School
- Eliot River Elementary School
- East Wiltshire Junior High

Students graduate East Wiltshire and go on to attend Bluefield High School in Hampshire for grades 10 to 12.

== Economy ==
The town established the Cornwall Business Park in 1997.

== Notable people ==
- Jared Connaughton, sprinter, Olympian, 2005 Canada Games gold medalist 100m & 200m
- Adam McQuaid, NHL hockey player, Stanley Cup Champion 2011
