= Mark O'Rourke =

Canadian curler

- Curler
- Born: July 7, 1962 (age 64); Charlottetown, Prince Edward Island, Canada

Team
- Curling club: Cornwall CC; Cornwall, PEI
- Skip: Bryan Cochrane
- Third: Ian MacAulay
- Second: Morgan Currie
- Lead: Mark O'Rourke

Curling career
- Brier: 13 (1991, 1993, 1995, 1996, 1997, 1999, 2001, 2006, 2007, 2008, 2009, 2010, 2020)

Mark William O'Rourke (born July 7, 1962, in Charlottetown, Prince Edward Island) is a Canadian curler.

In 1989, playing second for Robert Campbell, O'Rourke won the Canadian Mixed Curling Championship. O'Rourke has been to the Brier on 13 occasions (1991, 1993, 1995, 1996, 1997, 1999, 2001, 2006, 2007, 2008, 2009, 2010, 2020). He played second for Campbell in all of the Briers until 2006 except 1996 (alternate for Peter MacDonald) and 2001 (second for MacDonald). In 2007 and 2008 he was second for Peter Gallant, in 2009 he played lead for Rod MacDonald and in 2010 was his second.

In 2020, O'Rourke joined the Bryan Cochrane rink as lead, as the only resident Islander. The team, which also included PEI-natives (but Ontario residents) Ian MacAulay and Morgan Currie won the 2020 PEI Tankard and represented Prince Edward Island at the 2020 Tim Hortons Brier.

== Personal life ==
O'Rourke is married to Kathy O'Rourke and co-owns Beaton's Wholesale Dry Goods Limited.
