= Robert Campbell (curler) =

Canadian curler

Robert J. Campbell
- Curler
- Born: June 24, 1966 (age 60); Charlottetown, Prince Edward Island, Canada

Team
- Curling club: Charlottetown CC, Charlottetown, PEI
- Skip: Robert Campbell
- Fourth: John Likely
- Second: Mark O'Rourke
- Lead: Rod MacDonald

Curling career
- Brier: 9 (1991, 1993, 1995, 1997, 1999, 2001, 2002, 2003, 2007)
- World Mixed Doubles Championship: 1 (2011)

Robert J. Campbell (born June 24, 1966, in Charlottetown, Prince Edward Island) is a Canadian curler.

Campbell has skipped teams in six Briers (1991, 1993, 1995, 1997, 1999 and 2003); played third at the 2002 Brier for John Likely and played lead in 2007 for Peter Gallant, and was an alternate in the 2001 Brier.

Campbell has never won a Brier, but has skipped Prince Edward Island to two Canadian Mixed Curling Championships, in 1989 and the 2011 championship.

Campbell is a custom photo framer at PEI Photo Lab.
