= List of curling clubs in Scotland =

This is a list of curling clubs in Scotland. They are organized by the Royal Caledonian Curling Club which oversees curling in Scotland.

The RCCC has divided Scotland up into 13 areas.

Unlike curling clubs in other parts of the world, curling clubs in Scotland are not synonymous with the rink the play out of. Most rinks have several clubs playing out of them.

== Curling rinks ==
- Auchenharvie Leisure Centre, Stevenston
- Ayr Ice Rink, Ayr
- Border Ice Rink, Kelso
- Braehead Curling, Glasgow (closed 2020)
- Curl Aberdeen, Aberdeen
- Curl Edinburgh, Edinburgh
- Dumfries Ice Bowl, Dumfries
- Dundee Ice Arena, Dundee
- East Kilbride Ice Rink, East Kilbride
- Fife Ice Arena, Kirkcaldy
- Forfar Indoor Sports, Forfar
- Galleon Centre, Kilmarnock
- Greenacres Curling Rink, Howwood
- Inverness Ice Centre, Inverness
- Kinross Curling, Kinross
- Lanarkshire Ice Rink, Hamilton
- Live Active Dewars Centre, Perth
- Lockerbie Ice Rink, Lockerbie
- Moray Leisure Centre, Elgin
- Stranraer Ice Rink, Stranraer
- The Peak, Stirling
- Waterfront Leisure Complex, Greenock

== Area 1 (Ayrshire) ==
- Ayr Curling Club
- Ayr & Alloway Curling Club
- Ayr Country
- Ayr Junior Curling Club
- Ayr St. Columba
- Beresford Ladies
- Carnell
- Construction South
- Crosshill
- Cumnock & District
- Dalmellington Craigengillan Curling Club
- Darvel Curling Club
- Disnae Virtual Club
- Dundonald
- Fairywell
- Fullarton Curling Club
- Galston Haymouth Curling Club
- Gangrels Curling Club
- Garnock Academy
- Harvies Young Curlers
- Irvine Curling Club
- Kilwinning Eglinton
- Kirkoswald
- Land O Burns
- Mardi Ladies
- NHS Ayrshire & Arran
- Sorn Curling Club
- St Leonards
- Stewarton Academy
- Stewarton Heather Curling Club
- Symington
- Tarbolton Curling Club
- Troon Portland Curling Club

== Area 2 (Galloway & Rhins of Galloway) ==
- Castle Kennedy
- Glasserton
- Kirkcowan
- Kirkinner
- Kirkmabreck
- Leswalt
- Limekiln Loch
- Loch Connel
- Logan
- Minnigaff
- Penninghame
- Portpatrick
- Stoneykirk
- Stranraer Academy
- Stranraer Ice Rink
- Stranraer Wheelchair
- Virtually Curlers
- Wigtown

== Area 3 (Dumfriesshire & Stewartry) ==
- Annan
- Applegarth & Sibbaldbie
- Borgue
- Caerlaverock
- Cairn
- Corrie
- Craigielands
- Crocketford
- Dalbeattie
- Dalbeattie High School
- Dryfesdale
- Dumfries Curling Club
- Dumfries Academy
- Dumfries High School
- Dumfries Ice Bowl Curling Ass.
- Dumfries Ice Bowl Virtual Club
- Dumfries Young Curlers
- Durisdeer
- Eskdale
- Gretna & Border
- Holywood
- Hutton
- Johnstone & District
- Kirkcudbright Country
- Kirkmahoe
- Kirkpatrick-Durham
- Lochmaben Castle Curling Club
- Lochrutton
- Lockerbie Academy
- Lockerbie Virtual
- Lockerbie Wheelchair
- Morton
- New Abbey
- Nithsdale Ladies
- Parton
- Ruthwell
- Sanquhar Upper Nithsdale
- St. Joseph's College
- Threave Ladies
- Tongland
- Twynholm
- Waterbeck

== Area 4 (Border) ==
- Ayton Castle
- Border Curling Dev. Group
- Borders Virtual
- Borders Wheelchair
- Borders Young Curlers
- Chirnside
- Coldstream & Hirsel
- Duns
- Earlston
- Earlston High School
- Eildon
- Foulden
- Gala Water
- Greenlaw
- Jedburgh
- Kelso
- Kelso High School
- Lammermuir
- Lauderdale
- Lees
- Roxburghe
- Selkirk
- St Boswells
- Swinton
- Teviotdale

== Area 5 (Argyll & Renfrewshire) ==
- Alternative Curling Club
- Ardgowan
- Ardgowan Castle
- Auchenames
- Beith Morishill
- Between the Sheets
- Benmore & Kilmun Curling Club
- Blythswood Curling Club
- Breadalbane Glenorchy
- Bridge of Weir
- Bute Curling Club
- Brookfield
- Canadian
- Clydeview Academy
- Dalry Union Curling Club
- Dunoon Argyll Curling Club
- Dunoon Ladies Curling Club
- Druids
- Erskine Curling Club
- Gleniffer Curling Club
- Gourock Club
- Gourock Ladies
- Greenacres Ladies
- Greenacres Young Curlers
- Greenock Ladies
- Gryffe High School
- Howwood
- Kilmalcolm
- Largs Thistle
- Loch Goil Curling Club
- Lockwinnoch
- Millport Curling Club
- Muirdykes
- Neilston
- Newark Curling Club
- Oban Curling Club
- Old Grammarians
- Paisley St Mirren Curling Club
- Port Glasgow Curling Club
- Reform Curling Club
- Skelmorlie
- Tignabruich Curling Club
- Uplawmoor
- Upper Cowal Curling Club
- Waterfront Junior
- Whitecraigs Curling & Sporting Soc.

== Area 6 (Bigar District & Upper Clydesdale, Lanarkshire) ==
- Avondale Heather
- Bellshill
- Biggar
- Bothwell Ladies
- Cadzow
- Calder
- Cambusnethan
- Coulter
- Dippool
- Douglas
- East Kilbride
- East Kilbride & Haremyres
- East Kilbride Junior
- East Kilbride Virtual
- Hamilton & Thornyhill
- Hamilton Ice Sports Club
- Hamilton Ladies
- Hamilton Virtual
- Hamilton Young Curlers
- Lanark
- Lanark Ladies
- Lesmahagow
- Lesmahagow Ladies Section
- New Bothwell
- New Monklands
- South Lanarkshire Wheelchair
- Strathaven Golf
- Strathkelvin
- Stra'ven Ladies
- Upperward Ladies
- Wirsels Ladies
- Wishaw

== Area 7 (Dunbartonshire & Glasgow) ==
- 69
- Alma
- Bank of Scotland (Glasgow)
- Bearsden
- Bearsden Ski Club
- Beechnuts
- Braehead Rockers
- Braehead Virtual
- Braehead Wheelchair
- Braehead Young Curlers
- Cadder
- Cambuslang
- Cardross
- Carmunnock & Rutherglen
- Cathcart Castle
- Cawder House
- Clydesdale Bank (Glasgow)
- Crossmyloof
- Curlews
- Drystanes
- Dumbarton
- Dumbreck Ladies
- Duntocher
- Duntocher Ladies
- Eaglesham
- Giffnock
- Glasgow Academicals
- Glasgow & District Rotary
- Glasgow Ladies
- Glasgow Ptarmigan
- Glasgow XX
- Harlequins
- Helensburgh
- Kelvinside Academical
- Kelvinside Academy
- Maxwell Ladies
- Nondescripts
- Old Grenalmond
- Patrick
- Pollock
- Rolling Stones
- The Stones
- Whitecraigs LTSC

== Area 8 (East Lothian, Midlothian, Peeblesshire) ==
- 37 Club
- Abbotsford Curling Soc.
- Aberlady Curling Club
- Athelstaneford Curling Club
- Bank of Scotland (Edinburgh) Curling Club
- Barbarians Curling Club
- Boswall Curling Club
- Broughton United
- Bruntsfield Curling Soc.
- Carrington Curling Club
- Chartered Surveyors (Edinburgh)
- Clydesdale Bank (Edinburgh)
- Coates
- Colinton Ladies
- Corstorphine Curling Club
- Corstorphine Ladies Curling Club
- Crerar Seniors
- Currie & Balerno Curling Club
- D.A.F.S. Curling Club
- Dalkeith
- Dirleton
- Dominies
- Duddingston Curling Club
- East Linton Curling Club
- Eddleston
- Edinburgh Curling Club
- Edinburgh Academicals
- Edinburgh B.M.A. Ladies
- Edinburgh Ladies
- Edinburgh Medical
- Edinburgh New Stones Virtual
- Edinburgh Rotary
- ESMS (Mary Erskine)
- ESMS (Stewart's Melville)
- Ford Ladies
- George Heriot's FP
- George Heriot's School
- George Watson's College
- Gogar Park Curling Club
- Gogar Park Young Curlers
- Haddington Curling Club
- Haymarket
- Holyrood Curling Club
- Lothian Ladies
- Lothian Wheelchair
- Markle Outdoor Curling Soc.
- Merchiston Curling Club
- Mid Calder Curling Club
- Musketeers
- Musselburgh
- Newlands & Tarthwater
- Newmills
- North Berwick Doocot
- Oxenoord
- Peebles Curling Club
- Penicuik Curling Club
- Pentland Ladies Curling Club
- Police Scotland (East)
- Royal Bank of Scotland Curling Club (Edinburgh)
- SIAE Curling Club
- St. George's School for Girls
- Stewart's Melville F.P.
- Stray Dogs
- St Ronans Curling Club
- Sweepers
- Watsonian Curling Club
- West Linton
- Yester

== Area 9 (Central, Forth & Endrick, Stirlingshire, West Lothian) ==
- Abercorn Curling Club
- Airthrey Castle Curling Club
- Balfron
- Bathgate
- Blairdrummond
- Bonnybridge
- Borestone & Stirling
- Bridge of Allan
- Buccaneers
- Buchan
- Buchylvie
- Callander & Trossachs
- Campsie Glen
- Castle
- Denny Curling Club
- Dollar Ladies
- Doune
- Drymen
- Dunblane
- Dunblane High School
- Falkirk Curling Club
- Falkirk Ice Rink Curling Club
- Falkirk Ladies Curling Club
- Falkirk Ladies (1960)
- Fintry Curling Club
- Forest Hills Trossachs Curling Club
- Forth Valley Ladies
- Grangemouth
- Keir
- Kilsyth Curling Club
- Kilsyth Ladies
- Kippen
- Larbert Curling Club
- Laurieston and Zetland Curling Club
- Lenzie Ladies
- Linlithgow Curling Club
- Livingston Curling Club
- Loch Ard
- Oatridge Curling Club
- Old Fellows
- On the Button
- Port of Menteith
- Sauchie & Bannockburn Curling Club
- Stirling High School
- Stirling Ice Rink Senior Ladies
- Stirling Virtual
- Stirling Wheelchair
- Stirling Young Curlers
- Strathendrick Curling Club
- Torbrex
- Uphall Curling Club
- West Stirlingshire Ladies

== Area 10 (Cupar, East of Fife, West of Fife, Loch Leven) ==
- Abdie Curling Club
- Abdie Ladies Curlign Club
- Aberdour Curling Club
- Balcaskie Curling Club
- Bank of Scotland (Fife) Curling Club
- Beath High School
- Bishopshire
- Boreland Curling Club
- Broomhall
- Cambo
- Ceres Curling Club
- Crawford Priory
- Cupar Curling Club
- Dalgety Bay Curling Club
- Disabled Curlers Scotland (DICE)
- Dollar Academy
- Dollar & Devon Vale
- Dunfermline Curling Club
- Dunfermline Ladies Curling Club
- Falkland Curling Club
- Fife Ice Arena Virtual
- Fossoway Curling Club
- Fossway Ladies
- Forret Curling Club
- Glenfarg Curling Club
- Glenfarg Ladies Curling Club
- Glenrothes Curling Club
- Hercules Curling Club
- Hercules Ladies
- Inverkeithing Curling Club
- K2
- Kennoway Curling Club
- KCS - After School Club
- Kinross Curling Club
- Kinross High School
- Kinross Junior
- Kinross Ladies
- Kinross Virtual
- Kinross Wheelchair
- Kirkcaldy Junior
- Largo
- Leuchars
- Levins
- Loch Leven
- Lundin & Montrave
- Markinch Curling Club
- Newport Curling Club
- Orwell
- Orwell Ladies
- Pitlessie Curling Club
- Raith and Abbotshall Curling Club
- Raith & Abbotshall (Lds)
- Rothes
- St Andrews
- Stratheden Curling Club
- Strathkinness
- Thornton
- Tulliallan
- VICKs (Scotland)

== Area 11 (Atholl, Breadalbane, Perth & District, Strathmore, Upper Strathearn) ==
- Abercairney
- Airleywright
- Airleywright Ladies
- Ardblair
- Auchterarder
- Bank of Scotland (Perth & Dist.)
- Blackford & Carsebreck
- Blair Atholl
- Blairgowrie
- Breadalbane Aberfeldy
- Breadalbane Glendochart
- Breadalbane Kenmore
- Breadalbane Killin
- Clunie
- Comrie
- Coupar Angus & Kettins
- Craigie Hill Curling Club
- Crieff & Ochtertyre
- Delvine
- Drummond Castle
- Dunkeld
- Dunning
- Dunsinane Curling Club
- Errol
- Findo Gask
- Fingask
- Forteviot
- General Accident
- Glendoick
- Heath of the Highlands
- Kilgraston & Moncreiffe
- Kinfauns
- Lynedoch Ladies
- Methven
- Muthill Curling Club
- Murthly/Murthly Castle
- Perth
- Perth Academy
- Perth & Kinross Teachers
- Perth High School
- Perth Junior
- Perth Ladies
- Perth Virtual
- Pitlochry
- Pitlochry Ladies
- Rattray Curling Club
- Rossie
- Schiehallion Ladies
- Scone & Perth
- St Martins
- Strathallan Meath Moss
- Strathmore
- Toberargan
- Tullymet

== Area 12 (Angus, Dundee & District, North and South Esk, North-Eastern) ==
- Aberdeen Curling Club
- Aberdeen & District
- Aberdeen Civil Service Curling Club
- Aberdeen Grammar School FP
- Aberdeen Ladies
- Aberdeen Petroleum
- Aberdeen Wheelchair
- Aberlemno
- Angus Glens Curling Club
- AWW Curling Club
- Bank of Schotland (Aberdeen)
- Balruddery Curling Club
- Banchory Curling Club
- Bon Accord Pecten (Amalgamated)
- Braeknowe
- Brechin Castle
- Broughty Ferry
- Caterthun
- Claverhouse
- Clydesdale Bank (Aberdeen)
- Cocktail
- Curl Aberdeen Juniors
- Dalhousie Ladies Curling Club
- Donald's
- Dundee Curling Club
- Dundee Dragons
- Dundee Junior
- Dundee Ladies Curling Club
- Dun
- Dundee Virtual Club
- Edzell Curling Club
- Evenie Water Curling Club
- Fettercairn
- Fordoun
- Forfar Curling Club
- Forgar Academy
- Forfar Ladies Curling Club
- Forfar Virtual
- Forfar Young Curlers
- Fothringham Curling Club
- Glamis Curling Club
- Granite City Ladies
- Haddo House Curling Club
- High School of Dundee
- Huntly
- Kirriemuir Curling Club
- Kirriemuir & District Ladies Curling Club
- Laurencekirk
- Letham Grange Curling Club
- Lundie & Auchterhouse
- Meldrum & Daviot Curling Club
- Monifieth
- Northern Lights
- Panmure
- Pitkerro Curling Club
- Rubislaw Curling Club
- Suttieside Curling Club
- Tarland
- Turriff
- Ugie
- University of Dundee Curling Club

== Area 13 (Grampian, Inverness, Moray, Ross & Cromarty, Sutherland) ==
- Aberlour Curling Club
- Alness
- Ardclach Curling Club
- Aviemore
- Ballindaloch Curling Club
- Bank of Scotland (Highland) Curling Club
- Beauly
- Belmaduthy
- Brora
- Buckie
- Bught Ladies
- Caberfeidh
- Cairngorm Ladies Curling Club
- Carr-bridge Curling Club
- Cawdor Curling Club
- Citadel
- Culloden Academy
- Dalcross Curling Club
- Darnaway Curling Club
- Dornoch
- Elgin Curling Club
- Elgin Academy
- Elgin Rotary
- Elgin Tennis & Curling Club
- Fairburn
- Fifteen Club
- Fochabers Curling Club
- Forres Curling Club
- Highland
- Highland Junior Curlers
- Highland Ladies
- Highland Virtual
- Highland Wheelchair
- Highland & Islands DB
- Invergordon Academy Curling Club
- Inverness
- Inverness Hospitals
- Inverness Ice Rink Ladies
- Killearnan
- Kingsmills
- Kingussie
- Lochaber
- Locheye & St. Duthus Curling Club
- Loch Fleet
- Loch Ness
- Moray Firth Ladies
- Moray Junior Curling Club
- Moray Virtual
- Moray Wheelchair
- Muir of Ord
- Nairn Curling Club
- Nairn Academy
- Nairn Ladies Curling Club
- Northern Constabulary (Inverness)
- North Highland Curling Trust
- Rogart
- Ross-Shire Ladies
- Ross Sutherland Farmers
- Strathpeffer Spa
- Strathspey
- Sunninghill
- Torness
