= Dalgety Bay Curling Club =

The Dalgety Bay Curling Club is a social curling club based in Dalgety Bay, Fife, Scotland. The club plays its games at the Kinross Curling Rink in Kinross and the Edinburgh Curling Club, part of the Murrayfield Ice Rink next to Murrayfield Stadium.

The Club plays within the West of Fife province of Area 7, as allocated by the Royal Caledonian Curling Club. However, membership is open to men and women from anywhere in Scotland.

== History ==
The Dalgety Bay Curling Club was formed in 1980.

== Competitions ==
Internally, the Club members compete for the Stoddart and Suttie Cups, in the autumn and winter respectively, as well as thirds, knock-out, pairs, and points competitions. Within the curling area and province, the Club fields teams for the Green Hotel League, the West of Fife Province League, and a number of local bonspiels and friendlies.

== See also ==
- List of curling clubs in Scotland
