= Carsbreck railway station =

Railway station in Blackford, Scotland

Carsbreck
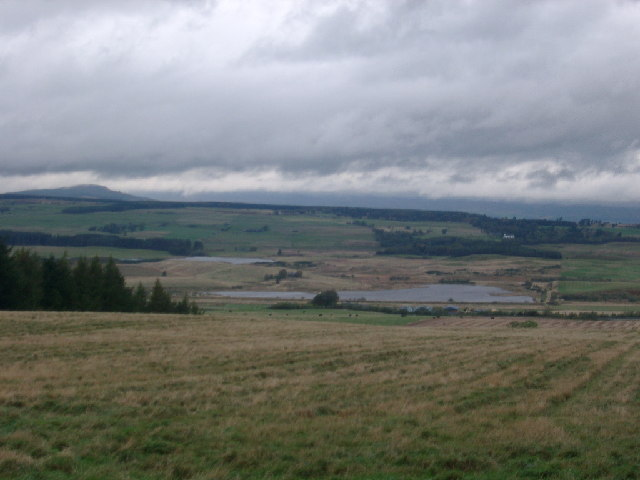
- Carsbreck Loch with the railway line embankment

General information
- Location: Blackford, Perth and Kinross; Scotland
- Coordinates: 56.260°N 3.827°W
- Grid reference: NN 86942 09004
- Platforms: 2

Other information
- Status: Disused

History
- Original company: Scottish Central Railway
- Pre-grouping: Caledonian Railway
- Post-grouping: London, Midland and Scottish Railway

Key dates
- Circa 1853: Station opened
- 1935.: Station closed
Location

Carsbreck railway station was a private station opened on the Scottish Central Railway near Carsebreck Loch, the Royal Caledonian Curling pond, between Stirling and Perth for the use of the curlers belonging to the Royal Caledonian Curling Club. It was first named by the Scottish Central Railway as 'Royal Curling Club Station, a host of later names being Caledonian Curling Society's Platform, Curling Pond Halt, Royal Curling Club Platform, Royal Curling Club Station, Netherton Halt and finally as Carsbreck Station. It is unclear how many of these were official names. The site lay in the parish of Ardoch, Perth and Kinross with the villages of Braco, Greenloaning and Blackford nearby. The Scottish Central Railway line had been opened in 1848.

== History ==
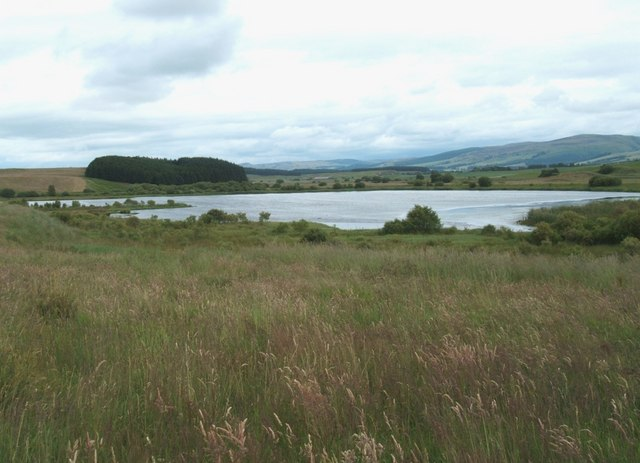
Carsebreck Loch

The existence of the railway at the site had been a major consideration in the selection of this site for the construction of a curling pond together with the geography of the site and its retentive clay bottom, peat having been extracted. The station had been opened by February 1853 and in addition to those named above 'Nethertown' and 'Carsebreck' are on record. Between 1853 and 1935 twenty-five bonspiels or 'Grand Matches' were held at Carsebreck Loch.

Changes in the climate created uncertainty of suitable ice being present and the curling pond ceased to be used with 1935 given as the closure date by one author and 1951 by another authority however the last Grand Match to be played at Carsebreck was in 1935.

== Infrastructure ==
An 1853 map of the site shows the double track line with two 'platform' areas demarcated and a building on the southern side. The word 'siding' is annotated however no siding as such is shown. The 'Brick House' is not marked. A roughcast two storey building, 'Brick House', thought to have been a surfaceman and crossing keeper's dwellings dating from Scottish Central Railway days, unoccupied but still standing, lies to the south next to a level crossing and a single fairly substantial building, possibly the curling house was at that time located on the southbound 'platform' area together with small shelters on each platform.

The Royal Caledonian Curling Club as stated had a club house and possibly a curling house and the existence of a siding is recorded in 1853. A path ran from the station across a drainage ditch and the Allan Water to the curling loch and to Carsebreck Farm. No access to the station from the nearby road or from Netherton Farm originally existed. The 'platform' area was originally quite short and it is said that for many years, up until 1906, curlers disembarked directly onto the ballast. No name board appears to have been present.

A major upgrade took place and in 1935 a track layout diagram and film seems to shows only a single very long platform on the northern side of a wooden construction with three sets of steps. A signal box, opened on 23 May 1905, stood on the southern side and several signals were present. Two tracks lay either side of the double track line with several sets of points creating two passing loops and four head shunts. Level crossings were located either side of the platform. The layout was designed for the frequent arrival, temporary storage and rapid departure of trains.

The sidings were lifted during WWII as part of the war effort and the curling pond received no maintenance.

== Services ==
Apart from advertised events such as bonspiels the stations use would not have been listed and it did not appear on the public timetables, the station being private and the sport had a very seasonal and unpredictable requirement for train services. The Royal Caledonian Curling Club negotiated a special ticket at half the normal price for the thousands of curlers who used the station. In 1935 it is recorded that 2576 curlers and 5000 people in total attended the bonspiel that had started at 11.25 and finished at 2.30pm and the queuing of passengers had to be carefully organised with only four carriages able to use the station platform at one time.

In 1853 trains with more than twenty carriages were provided, the locomotives being unequal to the task and the bulk of curlers arrived around an hour late. No matches were held from 1856 to 1859 with reduced attendance in 1860 however 1861 was a year of perfect conditions.

== The site today ==
The line remains open and the loch is still present, however nothing substantial remains of the platforms or the building other than the raised area at the southern platform.

== See also ==
- Aboyne Curling Pond railway station
- Drummuir Curlers' Platform railway station

== Sources ==
- Butt, R. V. J. (October 1995). The Directory of Railway Stations: details every public and private passenger station, halt, platform and stopping place, past and present (1st ed.). Sparkford: Patrick Stephens Ltd. ISBN 978-1-85260-508-7. OCLC 60251199. OL 11956311M.
- Murray. W. H. (1981). The Curling Companion. Glasgow : Richard Drew.
- Smith, David B. (1981). Curling : an Illustrated History. Edinburgh : John Donald. ISBN 0-85976-074-X.

Preceding station	Historical railways	Following station
Blackford; Line open, station closed	Scottish Central Railway	Greenloaning; Line open, station closed
