= Dunsinane =

Dunsinane may refer to:

- Dunsinane (play), a 2010 play by David Greig
- Dunsinane Curling Club, a curling club in Perthshire, Scotland
- Dunsinane Hill, remains of two forts, mentioned in Shakespeare's Macbeth, near Collace, Perthshire, Scotland
- Dunsinane Mountain, officially known as "Dunsinane", a summit in Colorado, U.S.
- William Nairne, Lord Dunsinane, Scottish advocate and judge
