= Curl Atlantic Championship =

Curling tournament in Sackville, New Brunswick, Canada

The Curl Atlantic Championship is an annual bonspiel, or curling tournament, held in Sackville, New Brunswick, that began in 2011. The purpose of the event is to better prepare High Performance Atlantic Curling Teams for the national and international stage. It will give Atlantic Teams exposure to arena ice, and allow the two winning teams to play in international events.

The championship will consist of twelve men's teams and twelve women's teams. Three teams will represent each province. In a situation where two or less teams represent a province, the vacant space will be filled by teams from remaining provinces.

== Men's Champions ==
Year	Winning Team	Finalist Locale	Runner-up Team	Finalist Locale
2011	James Grattan, Charlie Sullivan, Jr., Steven Howard, Peter Case	New Brunswick	Brett Gallant, Eddie MacKenzie, Anson Carmody, Alex MacFadyen	Prince Edward Island
2012	Eddie MacKenzie, Anson Carmody, Christian Tolusso, Alex MacFadyen	Prince Edward Island	Jamie Murphy, Jordan Pinder, Mike Bardsley, Don McDermaid	Nova Scotia

== Women's Champions ==
Year	Winning Team	Finalist Locale	Runner-up Team	Finalist Locale
2011	Suzanne Birt, Shelly Bradley, Robyn MacPhee, Leslie MacDougall	Prince Edward Island	Colleen Jones, Kirsten MacDiarmid, Helen Radford, Mary Sue Radford	Nova Scotia
2012	Stacie Devereaux, Erin Porter, Lauren Wasylkiw, Heather Martin	Newfoundland and Labrador	Suzanne Birt, Shelly Bradley, Sarah Fullerton, Leslie MacDougall	Prince Edward Island
