= PGCC =

PGCC may mean:

- Cooperation Council for the Arab States of the Gulf, the Persian Gulf Cooperation Council
- Pentium GCC
- Prince George's Community College
- Penang Global City Centre
- Port Glasgow Curling Club
