= Grand Match =

Scottish curling tournament

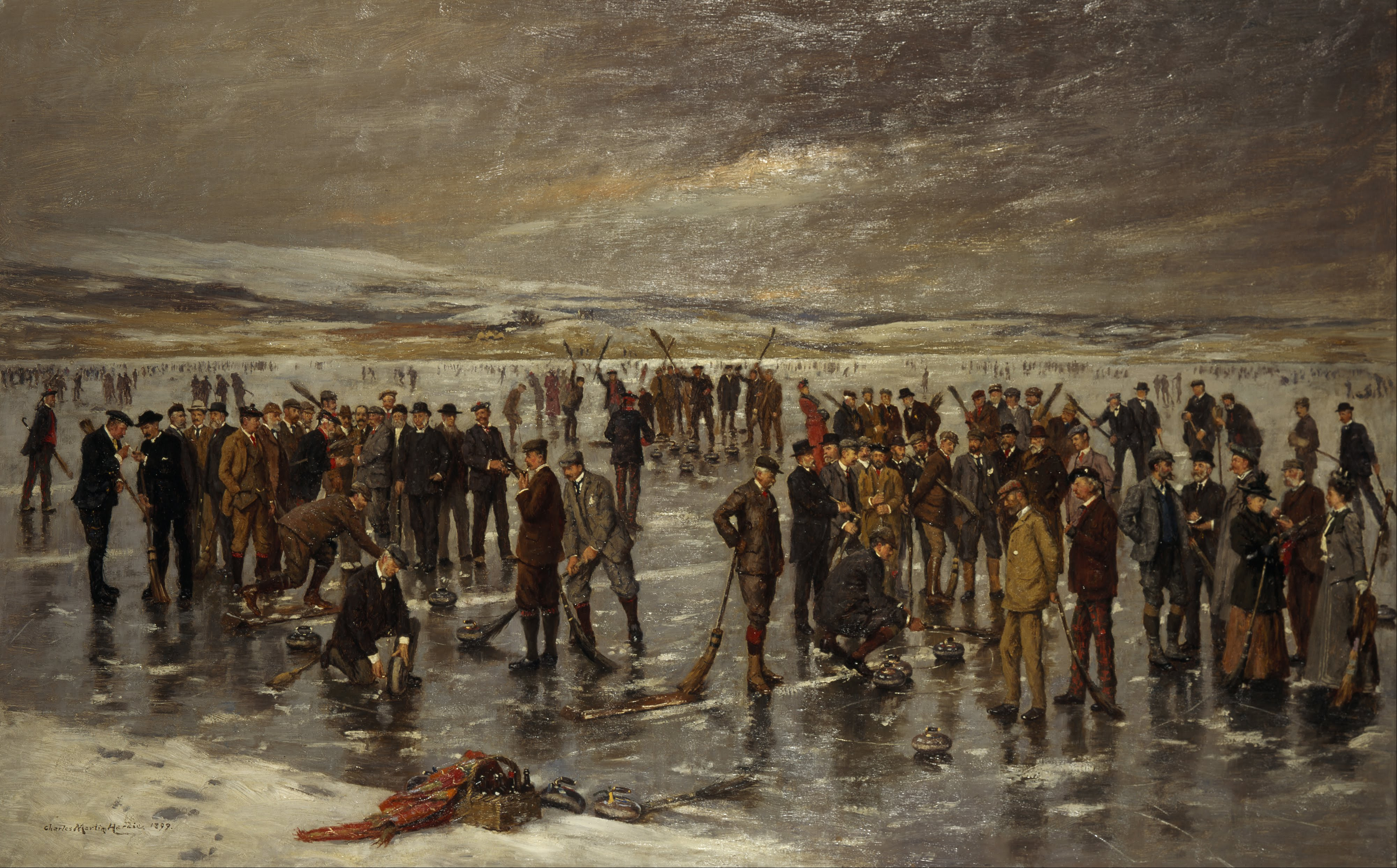
Charles Martin Hardie - Curling at Carsebreck (1899)

The Grand Match, also called The Bonspiel, is an outdoor curling tournament, or bonspiel, held most recently on the Lake of Menteith in Stirling, Scotland, when the weather is cold enough. Traditionally it is a match between the north and south of Scotland.

== History ==
The last tournament was held in 1979. From then until 2010, a loch never froze to the required depth of seven inches of ice to allow the tournament to take place. It can attract thousands of curlers when it is held. The Royal Caledonian Curling Club (RCCC) stated in December 2010 that the Lake of Menteith is no longer suitable for holding a Grand Match due to the logistics involved, with Loch Leven and the Piper Dam in Dundee now the preferred sites.

In total, the Grand Match has taken place on 38 occasions, of which 33 were on outside ice: one in November, nine in December, 16 in January, and seven in February. The five indoor matches were held at the Edinburgh and Glasgow ice rinks.

On 5 January 2010, following weeks of freezing weather conditions throughout the UK, the RCCC met to discuss holding the event for the first time in 30 years. However, just days later, the plans had to be scrapped as Health & Safety issues could not be resolved in the short time available. Nevertheless, upwards of 20,000 people turned up over the weekend in defiance of the police, and numerous matches were held on the ice. An unofficial tournament was planned for a few days later, not sanctioned by the RCCC. This had to be abandoned due to warmer weather making the ice dangerous.

To celebrate the millennium, an Indoor Grand Match was inaugurated in 2000, and this proved so popular that it became a regular event, being held every five years since. It is spread across several indoor ice rinks across the nation, with the last Indoor Grand Match in October 2015 being won by the south.

== List of national bonspiels ==
- Penicuik, 15 January 1847 - 96 competitors
- Linlithgow Loch, 1848 - 680 competitors, 6000 spectators
- Barr Meadow, 1850 - near Castle Semple Loch
- Carsebreck, near Blackford - 25 matches between 1853 and 1935, on leased land which was specially flooded to provide good, safe ice - the final match, on 24 December 1935, attracted 2576 competitors
- Loch of Aboyne was used for a bonspiel on 10 February 1891 between curlers from the south and north of the River Don.
- Loch Leven, 1959
- Lake of Menteith, 1963, 1979
