= Blackford railway station =

Disused railway station in Blackford, Perth and Kinross

Blackford
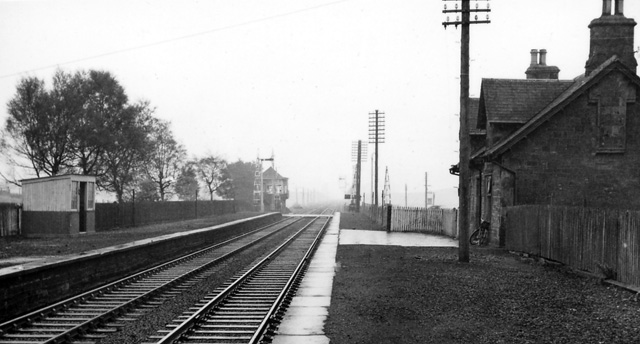
- The station in 1961

General information
- Location: Blackford, Perth and Kinross; Scotland
- Coordinates: 56.2628°N 3.7771°W
- Grid reference: NN900092
- Platforms: 2

Other information
- Status: Disused

History
- Original company: Scottish Central Railway
- Pre-grouping: Caledonian Railway
- Post-grouping: London, Midland and Scottish Railway

Key dates
- 22 May 1848: Opened
- 11 June 1956: Closed
Location

Blackford railway station served the village of Blackford, Perth and Kinross, Scotland from 1848 to 1956 on the Scottish Central Railway.

== History ==
The station opened on 22 May 1848 by the Scottish Central Railway. The station closed to both passengers and goods traffic on 11 June 1956.

Preceding station	Historical railways	Following station
Gleneagles; Line and station open	Scottish Central Railway	Carsbreck; Line open; Station closed
