= Port Glasgow Curling Club =

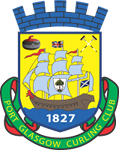
The Port Glasgow Curling Club crest.

Port Glasgow Curling Club is a curling club originating in Port Glasgow, Inverclyde, Scotland. Part of the Renfrewshire (12th) province of Area 5, the club plays at the Waterfront Leisure Complex curling rink in Greenock.

== History ==
Port Glasgow Curling Club was formed in 1827 and admitted to the Royal Caledonian Curling Club in 1840.

== Competitions ==
Members of the club's 12 rinks play annually for a number of club trophies, as well as against other local clubs in external competitions.

== See also ==
- List of curling clubs in Scotland
