= 2012 Curl Atlantic Championship =

- Host city: Sackville, New Brunswick
- Arena: Tantramar Civic Centre
- Dates: September 14–17
- Men's winner: (Prince Edward Island) Eddie MacKenzie
- Curling club: Charlottetown Curling Club
- Skip: Eddie MacKenzie
- Third: Anson Carmody
- Second: Christian Tolusso
- Lead: Alex MacFayden
- Finalist: (Nova Scotia) Jamie Murphy
- Women's winner: (Newfoundland and Labrador) Stacie Devereaux
- Curling club: Bally Haly Golf & Curling Club
- Skip: Stacie Devereaux
- Third: Erin Porter
- Second: Lauren Wasylkiw
- Lead: Heather Martin
- Finalist: (Prince Edward Island) Suzanne Birt

The 2012 Curl Atlantic Championship was held from September 14 to 17 at the Tantramar Civic Centre in Sackville, New Brunswick. This was the second time the event was held, and is designed to give top Atlantic curling teams the opportunity to play on arena ice. The winning teams of Eddie MacKenzie and Stacie Devereaux each took home CAD$3,000.

== Men ==
=== Teams ===
Entered Teams

==== Group A ====
| Skip | Vice | Second | Lead | Locale |
|---|---|---|---|---|
| Mark Dacey | Tom Sullivan | Steve Burgess | Andrew Gibson | Halifax, Nova Scotia |
| Eddie MacKenzie | Anson Carmody | Christian Tolusso | Alex MacFayden | Charlottetown, Prince Edward Island |
| Jamie Murphy | Jordan Pinder | Mike Bardsley | Don McDermaid | Halifax, Nova Scotia |
| Terry Odishaw | Andy McCann | Scott Jones | Grant Odishaw | Moncton, New Brunswick |
| Ken Peddigrew | Dave Noftall | Jeff Rose | Keith Jewer | St. Johns, Newfoundland and Labrador |
| Chad Stevens | Doug MacKenzie | Scott Saccary | Philip Crowell | Chester, Nova Scotia |

==== Group B ====
| Skip | Vice | Second | Lead | Locale |
|---|---|---|---|---|
| Peter Burgess | Craig Burgess | Jared Bent | Todd Burgess | Truro, Nova Scotia |
| Ian Fitzner-Leblanc (fourth) | Paul Flemming (skip) | Graham Breckon | Kelly Middelstadt | Halifax, Nova Scotia |
| James Grattan | Jason Roach | Darren Roach | Peter Case | Oromocto, New Brunswick |
| Ian Juurlink | Stuart MacLean | Chris MacRae | Kerry MacLean | Windsor, Nova Scotia |
| Marc LeCocq | Mike Kennedy | Jamie Brannen | David Konefal | Nackawic, New Brunswick |
| John Luckhurst | Pete Ross | Bryce Everist | Paul Dexter | Halifax, Nova Scotia |

=== Standings ===
==== Group A ====
| Skip | W | L | PF | PA | Ends Won | Ends Lost | Blank Ends | Stolen Ends |
|---|---|---|---|---|---|---|---|---|
| (Prince Edward Island) Eddie MacKenzie | 4 | 1 | 34 | 24 | 19 | 16 | 4 | 2 |
| (Nova Scotia) Jamie Murphy | 4 | 1 | 23 | 17 | 16 | 12 | 4 | 4 |
| (Nova Scotia) Mark Dacey | 3 | 2 | 30 | 22 | 17 | 15 | 3 | 5 |
| (New Brunswick) Terry Odishaw | 3 | 2 | 26 | 24 | 16 | 13 | 5 | 8 |
| (Newfoundland and Labrador) Ken Peddigrew | 1 | 4 | 22 | 32 | 15 | 19 | 4 | 4 |
| (Nova Scotia) Chad Stevens | 0 | 5 | 16 | 32 | 14 | 21 | 2 | 2 |

==== Group B ====
| Skip | W | L | PF | PA | Ends Won | Ends Lost | Blank Ends | Stolen Ends |
|---|---|---|---|---|---|---|---|---|
| (Nova Scotia) Paul Flemming | 4 | 1 | 30 | 24 | 14 | 18 | 6 | 2 |
| (New Brunswick) Marc le Cocq | 4 | 1 | 30 | 23 | 19 | 17 | 3 | 5 |
| (Nova Scotia) Peter Burgess | 3 | 2 | 31 | 25 | 14 | 14 | 8 | 2 |
| (New Brunswick) James Grattan | 2 | 3 | 23 | 27 | 13 | 15 | 4 | 5 |
| (Nova Scotia) Ian Juurlink | 1 | 4 | 21 | 27 | 14 | 15 | 6 | 5 |
| (Nova Scotia) John Luckhurst | 1 | 4 | 23 | 32 | 17 | 16 | 3 | 6 |

=== Results ===
==== Draw 1 ====
September 14, 8:00 AM AT

| Sheet 1 | 1 | 2 | 3 | 4 | 5 | 6 | 7 | 8 | Final |
| (Newfoundland and Labrador) Ken Peddigrew | 0 | 1 | 0 | 0 | 1 | 0 | 0 | X | 2 |
| (Nova Scotia) Mark Dacey 🔨 | 2 | 0 | 0 | 2 | 0 | 1 | 3 | X | 8 |

| Sheet 2 | 1 | 2 | 3 | 4 | 5 | 6 | 7 | 8 | Final |
| (New Brunswick) Terry Odishaw | 1 | 2 | 0 | 2 | 0 | 1 | 0 | 0 | 6 |
| (Nova Scotia) Chad Stevens 🔨 | 0 | 0 | 1 | 0 | 0 | 0 | 1 | 1 | 3 |

| Sheet 3 | 1 | 2 | 3 | 4 | 5 | 6 | 7 | 8 | 9 | Final |
| (Prince Edward Island) Eddie MacKenzie 🔨 | 2 | 0 | 1 | 0 | 0 | 2 | 0 | 1 | 0 | 6 |
| (Nova Scotia) Jamie Murphy | 0 | 2 | 0 | 1 | 1 | 0 | 2 | 0 | 1 | 7 |

==== Draw 2 ====
September 14, 12:00 PM AT

| Sheet 2 | 1 | 2 | 3 | 4 | 5 | 6 | 7 | 8 | Final |
| (Nova Scotia) Paul Flemming 🔨 | 2 | 1 | 0 | 0 | 2 | 0 | 0 | 0 | 5 |
| (Nova Scotia) Ian Juurlink | 0 | 0 | 0 | 1 | 0 | 1 | 1 | 1 | 4 |

| Sheet 3 | 1 | 2 | 3 | 4 | 5 | 6 | 7 | 8 | Final |
| (Nova Scotia) John Luckhurst | 2 | 0 | 2 | 0 | 1 | 2 | 1 | X | 8 |
| (New Brunswick) James Grattan 🔨 | 0 | 2 | 0 | 1 | 0 | 0 | 0 | X | 3 |

| Sheet 4 | 1 | 2 | 3 | 4 | 5 | 6 | 7 | 8 | Final |
| (Nova Scotia) Peter Burgess 🔨 | 1 | 0 | 2 | 0 | 1 | 0 | 2 | 0 | 6 |
| (New Brunswick) Marc le Cocq | 0 | 1 | 0 | 2 | 0 | 2 | 0 | 2 | 7 |

==== Draw 3 ====
September 14, 4:00 PM AT

| Sheet 3 | 1 | 2 | 3 | 4 | 5 | 6 | 7 | 8 | Final |
| (Nova Scotia) Mark Dacey | 1 | 2 | 0 | 1 | 0 | 2 | 0 | 1 | 7 |
| (Nova Scotia) Chad Stevens 🔨 | 0 | 0 | 1 | 0 | 2 | 0 | 1 | 0 | 4 |

| Sheet 4 | 1 | 2 | 3 | 4 | 5 | 6 | 7 | 8 | Final |
| (Prince Edward Island) Eddie MacKenzie 🔨 | 0 | 2 | 0 | 1 | 0 | 0 | 4 | X | 7 |
| (New Brunswick) Terry Odishaw | 0 | 0 | 0 | 0 | 2 | 0 | 0 | X | 2 |

| Sheet 5 | 1 | 2 | 3 | 4 | 5 | 6 | 7 | 8 | Final |
| (Nova Scotia) Jamie Murphy 🔨 | 0 | 1 | 0 | 0 | 2 | 0 | 0 | 1 | 4 |
| (Newfoundland and Labrador) Ken Peddigrew | 0 | 0 | 0 | 1 | 0 | 0 | 2 | 0 | 3 |

==== Draw 4 ====
September 14, 8:00 PM AT

| Sheet 4 | 1 | 2 | 3 | 4 | 5 | 6 | 7 | 8 | Final |
| (New Brunswick) James Grattan | 1 | 2 | 0 | 2 | 3 | X | X | X | 8 |
| (Nova Scotia) Ian Juurlink 🔨 | 0 | 0 | 1 | 0 | 0 | X | X | X | 1 |

| Sheet 5 | 1 | 2 | 3 | 4 | 5 | 6 | 7 | 8 | Final |
| (Nova Scotia) Paul Flemming 🔨 | 0 | 0 | 3 | 0 | 2 | 2 | 0 | X | 7 |
| (Nova Scotia) Peter Burgess | 0 | 0 | 0 | 3 | 0 | 0 | 1 | X | 4 |

==== Draw 5 ====
September 15, 8:00 AM AT

| Sheet 1 | 1 | 2 | 3 | 4 | 5 | 6 | 7 | 8 | Final |
| (Nova Scotia) Jamie Murphy 🔨 | 0 | 1 | 1 | 3 | 0 | 0 | 1 | X | 6 |
| (Nova Scotia) Chad Stevens | 1 | 0 | 0 | 0 | 0 | 1 | 0 | X | 2 |

| Sheet 5 | 1 | 2 | 3 | 4 | 5 | 6 | 7 | 8 | Final |
| (New Brunswick) Marc le Cocq | 0 | 0 | 0 | 1 | 0 | 3 | 1 | 0 | 5 |
| (Nova Scotia) John Luckhurst 🔨 | 1 | 1 | 0 | 0 | 1 | 0 | 0 | 1 | 4 |

==== Draw 6 ====
September 15, 12:00 PM AT

| Sheet 2 | 1 | 2 | 3 | 4 | 5 | 6 | 7 | 8 | Final |
| (Newfoundland and Labrador) Ken Peddigrew | 0 | 2 | 0 | 1 | 1 | 0 | 2 | 0 | 6 |
| (Prince Edward Island) Eddie MacKenzie 🔨 | 2 | 0 | 4 | 0 | 0 | 2 | 0 | 1 | 9 |

| Sheet 3 | 1 | 2 | 3 | 4 | 5 | 6 | 7 | 8 | Final |
| (Nova Scotia) Ian Juurlink | 0 | 0 | 0 | 2 | 0 | 2 | 1 | 0 | 5 |
| (Nova Scotia) Peter Burgess 🔨 | 0 | 2 | 0 | 0 | 4 | 0 | 0 | 0 | 6 |

| Sheet 5 | 1 | 2 | 3 | 4 | 5 | 6 | 7 | 8 | Final |
| (New Brunswick) Terry Odishaw 🔨 | 0 | 1 | 0 | 2 | 2 | 0 | 0 | 0 | 5 |
| (Nova Scotia) Mark Dacey | 0 | 0 | 4 | 0 | 0 | 1 | 1 | 3 | 9 |

==== Draw 7 ====
September 15, 4:00 PM AT

| Sheet 1 | 1 | 2 | 3 | 4 | 5 | 6 | 7 | 8 | Final |
| (Nova Scotia) John Luckhurst 🔨 | 1 | 0 | 0 | 1 | 0 | 1 | 1 | 0 | 4 |
| (Nova Scotia) Paul Flemming | 0 | 0 | 4 | 0 | 2 | 0 | 0 | 2 | 8 |

| Sheet 2 | 1 | 2 | 3 | 4 | 5 | 6 | 7 | 8 | Final |
| (New Brunswick) James Grattan 🔨 | 1 | 1 | 0 | 2 | 0 | 2 | 0 | X | 6 |
| (New Brunswick) Marc le Cocq | 0 | 0 | 1 | 0 | 2 | 0 | 2 | X | 5 |

==== Draw 8 ====
September 15, 8:00 PM AT

| Sheet 1 | 1 | 2 | 3 | 4 | 5 | 6 | 7 | 8 | Final |
| (Nova Scotia) Mark Dacey | 0 | 0 | 1 | 0 | 3 | 0 | 1 | 0 | 5 |
| (Prince Edward Island) Eddie MacKenzie 🔨 | 0 | 2 | 0 | 1 | 0 | 2 | 0 | 1 | 6 |

| Sheet 2 | 1 | 2 | 3 | 4 | 5 | 6 | 7 | 8 | Final |
| (Nova Scotia) Chad Stevens 🔨 | 0 | 0 | 1 | 0 | 1 | 1 | 0 | 0 | 3 |
| (Newfoundland and Labrador) Ken Peddigrew | 1 | 1 | 0 | 2 | 0 | 0 | 1 | 2 | 7 |

| Sheet 4 | 1 | 2 | 3 | 4 | 5 | 6 | 7 | 8 | Final |
| (New Brunswick) Terry Odishaw 🔨 | 2 | 2 | 1 | 0 | X | X | X | X | 5 |
| (Nova Scotia) Jamie Murphy | 0 | 0 | 0 | 1 | X | X | X | X | 1 |

==== Draw 9 ====
September 16, 8:00 AM AT

| Sheet 3 | 1 | 2 | 3 | 4 | 5 | 6 | 7 | 8 | Final |
| (New Brunswick) Marc le Cocq 🔨 | 1 | 0 | 1 | 2 | 0 | 1 | 2 | X | 7 |
| (Nova Scotia) Paul Flemming | 0 | 1 | 0 | 0 | 3 | 0 | 0 | X | 4 |

| Sheet 4 | 1 | 2 | 3 | 4 | 5 | 6 | 7 | 8 | Final |
| (Nova Scotia) Ian Juurlink 🔨 | 1 | 0 | 2 | 4 | 1 | X | X | X | 8 |
| (Nova Scotia) John Luckhurst | 0 | 2 | 0 | 0 | 0 | X | X | X | 2 |

| Sheet 5 | 1 | 2 | 3 | 4 | 5 | 6 | 7 | 8 | Final |
| (Nova Scotia) Peter Burgess 🔨 | 0 | 0 | 4 | 0 | 3 | X | X | X | 7 |
| (New Brunswick) James Grattan | 0 | 1 | 0 | 0 | 0 | X | X | X | 1 |

==== Draw 10 ====
September 16, 12:00 PM AT

| Sheet 3 | 1 | 2 | 3 | 4 | 5 | 6 | 7 | 8 | Final |
| (Newfoundland and Labrador) Ken Peddigrew | 0 | 2 | 0 | 0 | 0 | 2 | 0 | X | 4 |
| (New Brunswick) Terry Odishaw 🔨 | 1 | 0 | 4 | 1 | 1 | 0 | 1 | X | 8 |

| Sheet 5 | 1 | 2 | 3 | 4 | 5 | 6 | 7 | 8 | Final |
| (Nova Scotia) Chad Stevens | 1 | 0 | 1 | 0 | 0 | 2 | 0 | X | 4 |
| (Prince Edward Island) Eddie MacKenzie | 0 | 1 | 0 | 2 | 2 | 0 | 1 | X | 6 |

==== Draw 11 ====
September 16, 4:00 PM AT

| Sheet 1 | 1 | 2 | 3 | 4 | 5 | 6 | 7 | 8 | Final |
| (Nova Scotia) Paul Flemming | 0 | 3 | 0 | 0 | 0 | 1 | 0 | 2 | 6 |
| (New Brunswick) James Grattan 🔨 | 1 | 0 | 0 | 1 | 0 | 0 | 3 | 0 | 5 |

| Sheet 4 | 1 | 2 | 3 | 4 | 5 | 6 | 7 | 8 | Final |
| (Nova Scotia) Jamie Murphy 🔨 | 1 | 2 | 0 | 2 | X | X | X | X | 5 |
| (Nova Scotia) Mark Dacey | 0 | 0 | 1 | 0 | X | X | X | X | 1 |

==== Draw 12 ====
September 16, 8:00 PM AT

| Sheet 1 | 1 | 2 | 3 | 4 | 5 | 6 | 7 | 8 | Final |
| (New Brunswick) Marc le Cocq | 0 | 0 | 2 | 0 | 0 | 2 | 1 | 1 | 6 |
| (Nova Scotia) Ian Juurlink 🔨 | 0 | 1 | 0 | 0 | 2 | 0 | 0 | 0 | 3 |

| Sheet 2 | 1 | 2 | 3 | 4 | 5 | 6 | 7 | 8 | Final |
| (Nova Scotia) Peter Burgess | 0 | 4 | 0 | 0 | 2 | 1 | 0 | 1 | 8 |
| (Nova Scotia) John Luckhurst 🔨 | 2 | 0 | 1 | 2 | 0 | 0 | 0 | 0 | 5 |

=== Playoffs ===
Semifinals
A2 | (Nova Scotia) Jamie Murphy | 7
B1 | (Nova Scotia) Paul Flemming | 3
A1 | (Prince Edward Island) Eddie MacKenzie | 11
B2 | (New Brunswick) Marc le Cocq | 9

Final
A2 | (Nova Scotia) Jamie Murphy | 3
A1 | (Prince Edward Island) Eddie MacKenzie | 6

==== Semifinals ====
===== A2 vs. B1 =====
September 17, 9:00 AM AT

| Team | 1 | 2 | 3 | 4 | 5 | 6 | 7 | 8 | 9 | 10 | Final |
|---|---|---|---|---|---|---|---|---|---|---|---|
| (Nova Scotia) Jamie Murphy 🔨 | 1 | 0 | 0 | 1 | 0 | 3 | 0 | 1 | 1 | X | 7 |
| (Nova Scotia) Paul Flemming | 0 | 0 | 1 | 0 | 1 | 0 | 1 | 0 | 0 | X | 3 |

===== A1 vs. B2 =====
September 17, 9:00 AM AT

| Sheet A | 1 | 2 | 3 | 4 | 5 | 6 | 7 | 8 | 9 | 10 | Final |
|---|---|---|---|---|---|---|---|---|---|---|---|
| (Prince Edward Island) Eddie MacKenzie | 0 | 2 | 0 | 3 | 0 | 3 | 2 | 0 | 0 | 1 | 11 |
| (New Brunswick) Marc le Cocq 🔨 | 1 | 0 | 1 | 0 | 3 | 0 | 0 | 3 | 1 | 0 | 9 |

==== Final ====
September 17, 1:30 PM AT

| Team | 1 | 2 | 3 | 4 | 5 | 6 | 7 | 8 | 9 | 10 | Final |
|---|---|---|---|---|---|---|---|---|---|---|---|
| (Nova Scotia) Jamie Murphy 🔨 | 1 | 0 | 0 | 0 | 2 | 0 | 0 | 0 | 0 | 0 | 3 |
| (Prince Edward Island) Eddie MacKenzie | 0 | 1 | 1 | 0 | 0 | 0 | 0 | 1 | 2 | 1 | 6 |

== Women ==
=== Teams ===
Entered Teams

==== Group A ====
| Skip | Vice | Second | Lead | Locale |
|---|---|---|---|---|
| Andrea Crawford | Rebecca Atkinson | Danielle Parsons | Jodie DeSolla | Oromocto, New Brunswick |
| Marie Christianson | Kristen MacDiarmid | Christina Black | Jane Snyder | Halifax, Nova Scotia |
| Stacie Devereaux | Erin Porter | Lauren Wasylkiw | Heather Martin | St. John's, Newfoundland and Labrador |
| Mary Jane McGuire | Megan McGuire | Abby Burgess | Alice MacKay | Fredericton, New Brunswick |
| Sylvie Robichaud | Danielle Nicholson | Marie Richard | Kendra Lister | Moncton, New Brunswick |
| Heather Smith-Dacey | Stephanie McVicar | Blisse Comstock | Teri Lake | Halifax, Nova Scotia |

==== Group B ====
| Skip | Vice | Second | Lead | Locale |
|---|---|---|---|---|
| Mary-Anne Arsenault | Colleen Jones | Kim Kelly | Jennifer Baxter | Halifax, Nova Scotia |
| Suzanne Birt | Shelly Bradley | Sarah Fullerton | Leslie MacDougall | Charlottetown, Prince Edward Island |
| Kelly MacIntosh | Jen Crouse | Julie McEvoy | Sheena Gilman | Halifax, Nova Scotia |
| Megan Hughes (fourth) | Kathy O'Rourke (skip) | Jackie Reid | Tricia Affleck | Charlottetown, Prince Edward Island |
| Colleen Pinkney | Wendy Currie | Shelley MacNutt | Susan Creelman | Truro, Nova Scotia |
| Jessica Ronalds | Shannon Tatlock | Sarah Ronalds | Stephanie Taylor | Moncton, New Brunswick |

=== Standings ===
==== Group A ====
| Skip | W | L | PF | PA | Ends Won | Ends Lost | Blank Ends | Stolen Ends |
|---|---|---|---|---|---|---|---|---|
| (New Brunswick) Sylvie Robichaud | 5 | 0 | 29 | 19 | 22 | 15 | 3 | 6 |
| (Newfoundland and Labrador) Stacie Devereaux | 4 | 1 | 23 | 18 | 16 | 13 | 9 | 4 |
| (New Brunswick) Mary Jane McGuire | 2 | 3 | 22 | 24 | 18 | 17 | 7 | 5 |
| (Nova Scotia) Marie Christianson | 2 | 3 | 21 | 24 | 15 | 20 | 5 | 1 |
| (New Brunswick) Andrea Crawford | 1 | 4 | 22 | 28 | 18 | 17 | 7 | 3 |
| (Nova Scotia) Heather Smith-Dacey | 1 | 4 | 17 | 21 | 15 | 16 | 11 | 2 |

==== Group B ====
| Skip | W | L | PF | PA | Ends Won | Ends Lost | Blank Ends | Stolen Ends |
|---|---|---|---|---|---|---|---|---|
| (Nova Scotia) Kelly MacIntosh | 4 | 1 | 32 | 21 | 18 | 14 | 6 | 3 |
| (Prince Edward Island) Suzanne Birt | 4 | 1 | 30 | 22 | 20 | 19 | 1 | 6 |
| (Nova Scotia) Mary-Anne Arsenault | 3 | 2 | 25 | 19 | 16 | 13 | 5 | 5 |
| (Nova Scotia) Colleen Pinkney | 2 | 3 | 29 | 30 | 16 | 17 | 0 | 5 |
| (Prince Edward Island) Kathy O'Rourke | 1 | 4 | 24 | 31 | 17 | 18 | 4 | 4 |
| (New Brunswick) Jessica Ronalds | 1 | 4 | 21 | 36 | 13 | 18 | 3 | 2 |

=== Results ===
==== Draw 1 ====
September 14, 8:00 AM AT

| Sheet 4 | 1 | 2 | 3 | 4 | 5 | 6 | 7 | 8 | Final |
| (New Brunswick) Sylvie Robichaud 🔨 | 2 | 0 | 0 | 2 | 0 | 1 | 0 | X | 5 |
| (Newfoundland and Labrador) Stacie Devereaux | 0 | 0 | 1 | 0 | 1 | 0 | 0 | X | 2 |

| Sheet 5 | 1 | 2 | 3 | 4 | 5 | 6 | 7 | 8 | 9 | Final |
| (Nova Scotia) Marie Christianson | 0 | 0 | 0 | 1 | 0 | 2 | 0 | 1 | 0 | 4 |
| (Nova Scotia) Heather Smith-Dacey 🔨 | 0 | 0 | 2 | 0 | 1 | 0 | 1 | 0 | 1 | 5 |

==== Draw 2 ====
September 14, 12:00 PM AT

| Sheet 1 | 1 | 2 | 3 | 4 | 5 | 6 | 7 | 8 | Final |
| (New Brunswick) Jessica Ronalds 🔨 | 1 | 0 | 0 | 1 | 0 | 0 | 1 | X | 3 |
| (Prince Edward Island) Suzanne Birt | 0 | 1 | 3 | 0 | 2 | 1 | 0 | X | 7 |

| Sheet 5 | 1 | 2 | 3 | 4 | 5 | 6 | 7 | 8 | Final |
| (New Brunswick) Mary Jane McGuire | 2 | 0 | 0 | 1 | 3 | 0 | 0 | 2 | 8 |
| (New Brunswick) Andrea Crawford | 0 | 1 | 0 | 0 | 0 | 3 | 1 | 0 | 5 |

==== Draw 3 ====
September 14, 4:00 PM AT

| Sheet 1 | 1 | 2 | 3 | 4 | 5 | 6 | 7 | 8 | Final |
| (Nova Scotia) Mary-Anne Arsenault | 0 | 0 | 0 | 1 | 1 | 2 | 0 | X | 4 |
| (Prince Edward Island) Kathy O'Rourke 🔨 | 0 | 0 | 1 | 0 | 0 | 0 | 1 | X | 2 |

| Sheet 2 | 1 | 2 | 3 | 4 | 5 | 6 | 7 | 8 | Final |
| (Nova Scotia) Colleen Pinkney | 0 | 3 | 0 | 1 | 0 | 0 | 2 | 0 | 6 |
| (Nova Scotia) Kelly MacIntosh 🔨 | 4 | 0 | 2 | 0 | 1 | 1 | 0 | 1 | 9 |

==== Draw 4 ====
September 14, 8:00 PM AT

| Sheet 1 | 1 | 2 | 3 | 4 | 5 | 6 | 7 | 8 | Final |
| (Nova Scotia) Heather Smith-Dacey 🔨 | 1 | 0 | 0 | 0 | 2 | 0 | 0 | 0 | 3 |
| (New Brunswick) Mary Jane McGuire | 0 | 0 | 0 | 1 | 0 | 2 | 1 | 1 | 5 |

| Sheet 2 | 1 | 2 | 3 | 4 | 5 | 6 | 7 | 8 | Final |
| (Newfoundland and Labrador) Stacie Devereaux | 0 | 0 | 0 | 2 | 0 | 3 | 0 | 1 | 6 |
| (New Brunswick) Andrea Crawford 🔨 | 0 | 0 | 1 | 0 | 2 | 0 | 1 | 0 | 4 |

| Sheet 3 | 1 | 2 | 3 | 4 | 5 | 6 | 7 | 8 | Final |
| (Nova Scotia) Marie Christianson | 0 | 2 | 0 | 0 | 0 | 1 | 1 | 0 | 4 |
| (New Brunswick) Sylvie Robichaud 🔨 | 1 | 0 | 1 | 1 | 1 | 0 | 0 | 1 | 5 |

==== Draw 5 ====
September 15, 8:00 AM AT

| Sheet 2 | 1 | 2 | 3 | 4 | 5 | 6 | 7 | 8 | Final |
| (Prince Edward Island) Suzanne Birt 🔨 | 0 | 2 | 1 | 0 | 2 | 0 | 1 | 0 | 6 |
| (Prince Edward Island) Kathy O'Rourke | 1 | 0 | 0 | 1 | 0 | 2 | 0 | 1 | 5 |

| Sheet 3 | 1 | 2 | 3 | 4 | 5 | 6 | 7 | 8 | Final |
| (Nova Scotia) Kelly MacIntosh | 0 | 1 | 0 | 1 | 0 | 0 | 2 | 0 | 4 |
| (Nova Scotia) Mary-Anne Arsenault 🔨 | 1 | 0 | 2 | 0 | 0 | 1 | 0 | 1 | 5 |

| Sheet 4 | 1 | 2 | 3 | 4 | 5 | 6 | 7 | 8 | Final |
| (Nova Scotia) Colleen Pinkney 🔨 | 2 | 0 | 2 | 5 | 1 | X | X | X | 10 |
| (New Brunswick) Jessica Ronalds | 0 | 2 | 0 | 0 | 0 | X | X | X | 2 |

==== Draw 6 ====
September 15, 12:00 PM AT

| Sheet 1 | 1 | 2 | 3 | 4 | 5 | 6 | 7 | 8 | 9 | Final |
| (New Brunswick) Andrea Crawford 🔨 | 1 | 0 | 2 | 0 | 0 | 2 | 0 | 1 | 0 | 6 |
| (New Brunswick) Sylvie Robichaud | 0 | 3 | 0 | 1 | 1 | 0 | 1 | 0 | 1 | 7 |

| Sheet 4 | 1 | 2 | 3 | 4 | 5 | 6 | 7 | 8 | Final |
| (Newfoundland and Labrador) Stacie Devereaux 🔨 | 0 | 0 | 0 | 1 | 0 | 0 | 0 | 2 | 3 |
| (Nova Scotia) Heather Smith-Dacey | 0 | 0 | 1 | 0 | 1 | 0 | 0 | 0 | 2 |

==== Draw 7 ====
September 15, 4:00 PM AT

| Sheet 3 | 1 | 2 | 3 | 4 | 5 | 6 | 7 | 8 | Final |
| (Nova Scotia) Mary-Anne Arsenault 🔨 | 1 | 2 | 4 | 0 | X | X | X | X | 7 |
| (Nova Scotia) Colleen Pinkney | 0 | 0 | 0 | 1 | X | X | X | X | 1 |

| Sheet 4 | 1 | 2 | 3 | 4 | 5 | 6 | 7 | 8 | Final |
| (New Brunswick) Mary Jane McGuire | 0 | 0 | 1 | 0 | 0 | 0 | 1 | 0 | 2 |
| (Nova Scotia) Marie Christianson 🔨 | 1 | 0 | 0 | 0 | 1 | 1 | 0 | 3 | 6 |

| Sheet 5 | 1 | 2 | 3 | 4 | 5 | 6 | 7 | 8 | Final |
| (Nova Scotia) Kelly MacIntosh | 0 | 0 | 2 | 0 | 1 | 1 | 0 | 1 | 5 |
| (Prince Edward Island) Suzanne Birt 🔨 | 0 | 1 | 0 | 1 | 0 | 0 | 2 | 0 | 4 |

==== Draw 8 ====
September 15, 8:00 PM AT

| Sheet 3 | 1 | 2 | 3 | 4 | 5 | 6 | 7 | 8 | 9 | Final |
| (Nova Scotia) Heather Smith-Dacey | 0 | 0 | 1 | 0 | 0 | 0 | 2 | 0 | 0 | 3 |
| (New Brunswick) Andrea Crawford 🔨 | 1 | 0 | 0 | 0 | 0 | 1 | 0 | 1 | 1 | 4 |

| Sheet 5 | 1 | 2 | 3 | 4 | 5 | 6 | 7 | 8 | 9 | Final |
| (Prince Edward Island) Kathy O'Rourke | 1 | 0 | 1 | 1 | 0 | 4 | 0 | 0 | 1 | 8 |
| (New Brunswick) Jessica Ronalds 🔨 | 0 | 4 | 0 | 0 | 1 | 0 | 1 | 1 | 0 | 7 |

==== Draw 9 ====
September 16, 8:00 AM AT

| Sheet 1 | 1 | 2 | 3 | 4 | 5 | 6 | 7 | 8 | Final |
| (Nova Scotia) Marie Christianson 🔨 | 1 | 0 | 0 | 1 | 0 | 0 | 0 | X | 2 |
| (Newfoundland and Labrador) Stacie Devereaux | 0 | 1 | 1 | 0 | 1 | 1 | 4 | X | 8 |

| Sheet 2 | 1 | 2 | 3 | 4 | 5 | 6 | 7 | 8 | Final |
| (New Brunswick) Mary Jane McGuire | 0 | 1 | 0 | 2 | 0 | 0 | 1 | 0 | 4 |
| (New Brunswick) Sylvie Robichaud 🔨 | 1 | 0 | 0 | 0 | 1 | 1 | 0 | 3 | 6 |

==== Draw 10 ====
September 16, 12:00 PM AT

| Sheet 1 | 1 | 2 | 3 | 4 | 5 | 6 | 7 | 8 | Final |
| (Prince Edward Island) Suzanne Birt | 1 | 1 | 0 | 0 | 0 | 2 | 0 | 2 | 6 |
| (Nova Scotia) Colleen Pinkney 🔨 | 0 | 0 | 1 | 1 | 1 | 0 | 1 | 0 | 4 |

| Sheet 2 | 1 | 2 | 3 | 4 | 5 | 6 | 7 | 8 | Final |
| (New Brunswick) Jessica Ronalds | 0 | 1 | 0 | 2 | 0 | 3 | X | X | 6 |
| (Nova Scotia) Mary-Anne Arsenault 🔨 | 0 | 0 | 1 | 0 | 2 | 0 | X | X | 3 |

| Sheet 4 | 1 | 2 | 3 | 4 | 5 | 6 | 7 | 8 | Final |
| (Prince Edward Island) Kathy O'Rourke | 0 | 1 | 0 | 0 | 0 | 0 | 2 | X | 3 |
| (Nova Scotia) Kelly MacIntosh | 0 | 0 | 2 | 0 | 2 | 2 | 0 | X | 6 |

==== Draw 11 ====
September 16, 4:00 PM AT

| Sheet 2 | 1 | 2 | 3 | 4 | 5 | 6 | 7 | 8 | Final |
| (New Brunswick) Andrea Crawford 🔨 | 0 | 1 | 0 | 1 | 0 | 1 | 1 | 0 | 4 |
| (Nova Scotia) Marie Christianson | 0 | 0 | 3 | 0 | 1 | 0 | 0 | 1 | 5 |

| Sheet 3 | 1 | 2 | 3 | 4 | 5 | 6 | 7 | 8 | Final |
| (New Brunswick) Sylvie Robichaud 🔨 | 1 | 0 | 2 | 0 | 0 | 1 | 1 | 1 | 6 |
| (Nova Scotia) Heather Smith-Dacey | 0 | 1 | 0 | 1 | 1 | 0 | 0 | 0 | 3 |

| Sheet 5 | 1 | 2 | 3 | 4 | 5 | 6 | 7 | 8 | Final |
| (Newfoundland and Labrador) Stacie Devereaux 🔨 | 0 | 1 | 1 | 0 | 0 | 1 | 0 | 1 | 4 |
| (New Brunswick) Mary Jane McGuire | 0 | 0 | 0 | 1 | 1 | 0 | 1 | 0 | 3 |

==== Draw 12 ====
September 16, 8:00 PM AT

| Sheet 3 | 1 | 2 | 3 | 4 | 5 | 6 | 7 | 8 | Final |
| (Nova Scotia) Colleen Pinkney | 0 | 3 | 0 | 0 | 1 | 1 | 0 | 3 | 8 |
| (Prince Edward Island) Kathy O'Rourke 🔨 | 2 | 0 | 1 | 2 | 0 | 0 | 1 | 0 | 6 |

| Sheet 4 | 1 | 2 | 3 | 4 | 5 | 6 | 7 | 8 | 9 | Final |
| (Nova Scotia) Mary-Anne Arsenault | 0 | 2 | 1 | 0 | 1 | 0 | 0 | 1 | 0 | 5 |
| (Prince Edward Island) Suzanne Birt 🔨 | 1 | 0 | 0 | 2 | 0 | 1 | 1 | 0 | 1 | 6 |

| Sheet 5 | 1 | 2 | 3 | 4 | 5 | 6 | 7 | 8 | Final |
| (New Brunswick) Jessica Ronalds | 0 | 0 | 0 | 2 | 0 | 1 | 0 | X | 3 |
| (Nova Scotia) Kelly MacIntosh 🔨 | 0 | 0 | 1 | 0 | 2 | 0 | 5 | X | 8 |

=== Playoffs ===
Semifinals
A2 | (Newfoundland and Labrador) Stacie Devereaux | 8
B1 | (Nova Scotia) Kelly MacIntosh | 7
A1 | (New Brunswick) Sylvie Robichaud | 6
B2 | (Prince Edward Island) Suzanne Birt | 7

Final
A2 | (Newfoundland and Labrador) Stacie Devereaux | 9
B2 | (Prince Edward Island) Suzanne Birt | 6

==== Semifinals ====
===== A2 vs. B1 =====
September 17, 9:00 AM AT

| Team | 1 | 2 | 3 | 4 | 5 | 6 | 7 | 8 | 9 | 10 | Final |
|---|---|---|---|---|---|---|---|---|---|---|---|
| (Newfoundland and Labrador) Stacie Devereaux | 2 | 0 | 1 | 0 | 2 | 1 | 1 | 0 | 0 | 1 | 8 |
| (Nova Scotia) Kelly MacIntosh 🔨 | 0 | 1 | 0 | 4 | 0 | 0 | 0 | 0 | 2 | 0 | 7 |

===== A1 vs. B2 =====
September 17, 9:00 AM AT

| Team | 1 | 2 | 3 | 4 | 5 | 6 | 7 | 8 | 9 | 10 | Final |
|---|---|---|---|---|---|---|---|---|---|---|---|
| (New Brunswick) Sylvie Robichaud 🔨 | 1 | 0 | 2 | 0 | 0 | 2 | 1 | 0 | 0 | 0 | 6 |
| (Prince Edward Island) Suzanne Birt | 0 | 1 | 0 | 0 | 2 | 0 | 0 | 1 | 1 | 2 | 7 |

==== Final ====
September 17, 1:30 PM AT

| Team | 1 | 2 | 3 | 4 | 5 | 6 | 7 | 8 | 9 | 10 | Final |
|---|---|---|---|---|---|---|---|---|---|---|---|
| (Newfoundland and Labrador) Stacie Devereaux | 1 | 0 | 0 | 3 | 0 | 3 | 0 | 1 | 0 | 1 | 9 |
| (Prince Edward Island) Suzanne Birt 🔨 | 0 | 2 | 1 | 0 | 1 | 0 | 1 | 0 | 1 | 0 | 6 |
