= Evenie Water Curling Club =

Curling club in Scotland

Evenie Water Curling Club was formed in 1872 and has been active in Angus curling circles ever since. The original curling pond is on the estate of Middleton of Gardyne close to the village of Friockheim, Scotland. The club currently curls at Forfar ice rink and the club is a member of the Royal Caledonian Curling Club and actively compete in RCCC competitions.

The origin of the name of the curling club comes from an old name of a small river running through the area. The book “Angus or Forfarshire The Land and People” volume 2 by A. J. Warden. in 1881 contains an older description of Forfarshire and is headed “ Ochterlony’s Account of the shire of Forfar, 1684-5” which has the following section on Evenie -

"Dunichine, baronie of Ouchterlony, which formerly belonged to the Lairds of Ouchterlony of that Ilk, but hath no house on it, is a considerable thing, and a pleasant place, belonging to the Earl of Southesk. Barronie of TuIcorse, belonging to John Ouchterlony of Guynd, only representative of the forsaid familie of Ouchterlony of that Ilk. Dumbarrow, Arrot. The parish lies on both sides of the Water of Lounane, which at that place is called Evenie: the minister called Mr Lindsay. In the Diocese of Brechine; Earl of Panmure, patrone thereof."

Members of the Evenie Water Curling Club appear to have been influential in the spreading of the game to Norway as well, as by 1881, several members of the only acknowledged Curling club in Norway at the time (the Elverhae Club) were Honorary Members of Evenie Water, and vice versa.

The club also maintains facilities to support outdoor curling when weather conditions make it possible, such as the winter of 2010, when a colder than normal spell allowed the members to curl on a pair of outdoor rinks, both in Hatton Mill and Cononsyth.
