= Penicuik Curling Club =

Scottish curling club

The Penicuik Curling Club is a curling club located in Scotland.

== History ==
As one of the oldest curling clubs in Scotland, the Penicuik Curling Club celebrated its bi-centenary in 2015. It is an active club within the Midlothian Province of the Royal Caledonian Curling Club, Scotland's governing body of curling, and its home ice rink is the Murrayfield Ice Rink in Edinburgh. When weather permits, the club play outdoors on the Low Pond in the Penicuik Estate.
