= 2011 Curl Atlantic Championship =

- Host city: Sackville, New Brunswick
- Arena: Tantramar Civic Centre
- Dates: September 23–26
- Men's winner: (New Brunswick) James Grattan
- Curling club: Oromocto, New Brunswick
- Skip: James Grattan
- Third: Charlie Sullivan, Jr.
- Second: Steven Howard
- Lead: Peter Case
- Alternate: Paul Nason
- Finalist: (Prince Edward Island) Brett Gallant
- Women's winner: (Prince Edward Island) Suzanne Birt
- Curling club: Charlottetown, Prince Edward Island
- Skip: Suzanne Birt
- Third: Shelly Bradley
- Second: Robyn MacPhee
- Lead: Leslie MacDougall
- Finalist: (Nova Scotia) Colleen Jones

The 2011 Curl Atlantic Championship was held from September 23 to 26 at the Tantramar Civic Centre in Sackville, New Brunswick. This was the first edition of the Curl Atlantic Championship. The goal of this event was to better prepare high performance Atlantic curling teams for the national and international stage. The winning men's team, skipped by James Grattan, will participate in the Perth Masters in Perth, Scotland, while the winning women's team, skipped by Suzanne Birt, will participate in the International Bernese Ladies Cup in Bern, Switzerland.

== Men ==
=== Teams ===
==== Group A ====
Skip	Vice	Second	Lead	Alternate	Locale
Mark Dacey	Tom Sullivan	Andrew Gibson	Adam Casey		Halifax, Nova Scotia
James Grattan	Charlie Sullivan, Jr.	Steven Howard	Peter Case	Paul Nason	Oromocto, New Brunswick
Ian Juurlink	Paul Dexter	Kendal Thompson	Tyler Gamble		Windsor, Nova Scotia
John Luckhurst	Bryce Everist	Peter Ross	Tuan Bui		Halifax, Nova Scotia
Terry Odishaw	Andy McCann	Scott Jones	Grant Odishaw		Moncton, New Brunswick
Kent Smith	Stuart MacLean	Mark Robar	Paul Crowel		Halifax, Nova Scotia

==== Group B ====
Skip	Vice	Second	Lead	Alternate	Locale
Peter Burgess	Craig Burgess	Jared Bent	Todd Burgess		Truro, Nova Scotia
Paul Dobson	Kevin Boyle	Mark Dobson	Spencer Mawhinney		Saint John, New Brunswick
Ian Fitzner-Leblanc	Paul Flemming	Robbie Doherty	Kelly Mittelstadt		Halifax, Nova Scotia
Brett Gallant	Eddie MacKenzie	Anson Carmody	Alex MacFadyen		Charlottetown, Prince Edward Island
Jamie Murphy	Jordan Pinder	Mike Bardsley	Donald McDermaid		Halifax, Nova Scotia
Colin Thomas	Cory Schuh	Chris Ford	Spencer Wicks	Stephen Ryan	St. Johns, Newfoundland and Labrador

=== Standings ===
==== Group A ====
Skip	W	L	PF	PA	Ends Won	Ends Lost	Blank Ends	Stolen Ends
(New Brunswick) James Grattan	5	0	33	16	19	14	3	7
(Nova Scotia) Ian Juurlink	4	1	31	26	20	17	1	7
(Nova Scotia) Mark Dacey	2	3	24	27	15	17	3	4
(New Brunswick) Terry Odishaw	2	3	22	23	11	17	1	4
(Nova Scotia) John Luckhurst	1	4	21	30	16	14	3	7
(Nova Scotia) Kent Smith	1	4	20	30	14	18	3	1

==== Group B ====
Skip	W	L	PF	PA	Ends Won	Ends Lost	Blank Ends	Stolen Ends
(Prince Edward Island) Brett Gallant	4	1	27	19	19	12	6	7
(Nova Scotia) Jamie Murphy	4	1	30	23	17	15	8	4
(Nova Scotia) Peter Burgess	3	2	25	19	14	11	5	8
(New Brunswick) Paul Dobson	2	3	28	27	14	19	3	1
(Nova Scotia) Ian Fitzner-Leblanc	2	3	21	28	15	17	4	4
(Newfoundland and Labrador) Colin Thomas	0	5	18	32	12	18	6	4

=== Results ===
==== Draw 1 ====
September 23, 8:00 AM AT

Sheet 4	1	2	3	4	5	6	7	8	Final
(Nova Scotia) Ian Juurlink	0	1	1	1	2	0	0	1	6
(New Brunswick) Terry Odishaw 🔨	2	0	0	0	0	1	1	0	4

Sheet 5	1	2	3	4	5	6	7	8	9	Final
(New Brunswick) James Grattan	0	0	2	0	1	0	0	1	1	5
(Nova Scotia) Mark Dacey 🔨	0	1	0	2	0	0	1	0	0	4

==== Draw 2 ====
September 23, 12:00 PM AT

Sheet 1	1	2	3	4	5	6	7	8	Final
(Prince Edward Island) Brett Gallant	1	1	0	0	1	0	0	1	4
(Nova Scotia) Ian Fitzner-Leblanc 🔨	0	0	1	1	0	0	0	0	2

Sheet 5	1	2	3	4	5	6	7	8	Final
(Nova Scotia) Kent Smith 🔨	0	2	0	0	2	1	0	1	6
(Nova Scotia) John Luckhurst	1	0	1	0	0	0	2	0	4

==== Draw 3 ====
September 23, 4:00 PM AT

Sheet 1	1	2	3	4	5	6	7	8	Final
(Nova Scotia) Peter Burgess 🔨	0	0	0	3	0	0	1	0	4
(Nova Scotia) Jamie Murphy	0	0	1	0	1	3	0	1	6

Sheet 5	1	2	3	4	5	6	7	8	Final
(New Brunswick) Paul Dobson	0	3	0	2	1	0	2	X	8
(Newfoundland and Labrador) Colin Thomas 🔨	2	0	1	0	0	1	0	X	4

==== Draw 4 ====
September 23, 8:00 PM AT

Sheet 1	1	2	3	4	5	6	7	8	Final
(Nova Scotia) John Luckhurst	1	1	0	1	0	0	2	X	5
(Nova Scotia) Mark Dacey 🔨	0	0	3	0	3	0	0	X	6

Sheet 2	1	2	3	4	5	6	7	8	Final
(New Brunswick) James Grattan 🔨	0	3	1	1	1	0	X	X	6
(New Brunswick) Terry Odishaw	1	0	0	0	0	1	X	X	2

Sheet 3	1	2	3	4	5	6	7	8	Final
(Nova Scotia) Ian Juurlink	0	0	1	0	3	2	0	1	7
(Nova Scotia) Kent Smith 🔨	0	1	0	2	0	0	2	0	5

==== Draw 5 ====
September 24, 8:00 AM AT

Sheet 2	1	2	3	4	5	6	7	8	Final
(Nova Scotia) Ian Fitzner-Leblanc 🔨	0	0	2	1	0	2	0	1	6
(Newfoundland and Labrador) Colin Thomas	1	2	0	0	1	0	1	0	5

Sheet 3	1	2	3	4	5	6	7	8	9	Final
(Nova Scotia) Jamie Murphy 🔨	2	0	2	0	0	1	1	0	0	6
(Prince Edward Island) Brett Gallant	0	2	0	3	0	0	0	1	1	7

Sheet 4	1	2	3	4	5	6	7	8	Final
(New Brunswick) Paul Dobson 🔨	0	0	0	3	0	1	0	X	4
(Nova Scotia) Peter Burgess	1	2	1	0	2	0	1	X	7

==== Draw 6 ====
September 24, 12:00 PM AT

Sheet 1	1	2	3	4	5	6	7	8	Final
(Nova Scotia) Ian Juurlink 🔨	0	2	0	1	1	0	0	X	4
(New Brunswick) James Grattan	1	0	2	0	0	2	1	X	6

Sheet 4	1	2	3	4	5	6	7	8	Final
(New Brunswick) Terry Odishaw	0	0	0	0	0	X	X	X	0
(Nova Scotia) John Luckhurst 🔨	0	1	1	2	1	X	X	X	5

==== Draw 7 ====
September 24, 4:00 PM AT

Sheet 3	1	2	3	4	5	6	7	8	Final
(Nova Scotia) Ian Fitzner-Leblanc 🔨	1	1	0	3	0	2	0	1	8
(New Brunswick) Paul Dobson	0	0	2	0	3	0	2	0	7

Sheet 4	1	2	3	4	5	6	7	8	Final
(Nova Scotia) Mark Dacey 🔨	1	1	0	2	1	0	X	X	5
(Nova Scotia) Kent Smith	0	0	1	0	0	1	X	X	2

Sheet 5	1	2	3	4	5	6	7	8	Final
(Newfoundland and Labrador) Colin Thomas	0	1	0	0	2	2	0	0	5
(Nova Scotia) Jamie Murphy 🔨	1	0	0	4	0	0	0	1	6

==== Draw 8 ====
September 24, 8:00 PM AT

Sheet 3	1	2	3	4	5	6	7	8	Final
(Nova Scotia) John Luckhurst	0	1	3	0	0	1	0	X	5
(Nova Scotia) Ian Juurlink 🔨	1	0	0	2	1	0	3	X	7

Sheet 5	1	2	3	4	5	6	7	8	Final
(Prince Edward Island) Brett Gallant 🔨	1	0	3	2	2	X	X	X	8
(Nova Scotia) Peter Burgess	0	1	0	0	0	X	X	X	1

==== Draw 9 ====
September 25, 8:00 AM AT

Sheet 1	1	2	3	4	5	6	7	8	Final
(Nova Scotia) Mark Dacey 🔨	1	0	2	0	0	X	X	X	3
(New Brunswick) Terry Odishaw	0	3	0	4	1	X	X	X	8

Sheet 2	1	2	3	4	5	6	7	8	Final
(Nova Scotia) Kent Smith	0	1	0	1	0	0	2	0	4
(New Brunswick) James Grattan 🔨	1	0	1	0	1	0	0	2	5

==== Draw 10 ====
September 25, 12:00 PM AT

Sheet 1	1	2	3	4	5	6	7	8	Final
(Newfoundland and Labrador) Colin Thomas	0	0	1	0	0	0	3	0	4
(Prince Edward Island) Brett Gallant 🔨	0	1	0	2	1	0	0	1	5

Sheet 2	1	2	3	4	5	6	7	8	Final
(Nova Scotia) Jamie Murphy	0	1	0	2	0	2	0	X	5
(New Brunswick) Paul Dobson 🔨	2	0	0	0	1	0	0	X	3

Sheet 4	1	2	3	4	5	6	7	8	Final
(Nova Scotia) Peter Burgess	0	1	0	3	2	X	X	X	6
(Nova Scotia) Ian Fitzner-Leblanc 🔨	0	0	1	0	0	X	X	X	1

==== Draw 11 ====
September 25, 4:00 PM AT

Sheet 2	1	2	3	4	5	6	7	8	Final
(Nova Scotia) Mark Dacey	0	2	1	0	2	1	0	0	6
(Nova Scotia) Ian Juurlink 🔨	3	0	0	1	0	0	1	2	7

Sheet 3	1	2	3	4	5	6	7	8	Final
(New Brunswick) James Grattan	2	0	3	0	1	5	X	X	11
(Nova Scotia) John Luckhurst 🔨	0	1	0	1	0	0	X	X	2

Sheet 5	1	2	3	4	5	6	7	8	Final
(New Brunswick) Terry Odishaw	3	0	2	0	4	X	X	X	9
(Nova Scotia) Kent Smith 🔨	0	1	0	2	0	X	X	X	3

==== Draw 12 ====
September 25, 8:00 PM AT

Sheet 3	1	2	3	4	5	6	7	8	Final
(Newfoundland and Labrador) Colin Thomas 🔨	0	0	0	0	0	X	X	X	0
(Nova Scotia) Peter Burgess	0	2	3	0	2	X	X	X	7

Sheet 4	1	2	3	4	5	6	7	8	Final
(Prince Edward Island) Brett Gallant	0	1	0	1	0	1	0	X	3
(New Brunswick) Paul Dobson 🔨	1	0	1	0	0	0	4	X	6

Sheet 5	1	2	3	4	5	6	7	8	Final
(Nova Scotia) Jamie Murphy 🔨	2	0	0	3	0	0	2	X	7
(Nova Scotia) Ian Fitzner-Leblanc	0	1	0	0	2	1	0	X	4

=== Playoffs ===
Semifinals
A2	(Nova Scotia) Ian Juurlink	4
B1	(Prince Edward Island) Brett Gallant	6
A1	(New Brunswick) James Grattan	10
B2	(Nova Scotia) Jamie Murphy	7

Final
B1	(Prince Edward Island) Brett Gallant	5
A1	(New Brunswick) James Grattan	8

==== Semifinals ====
===== A2 vs. B1 =====
September 26, 9:00 AM AT

Sheet 1	1	2	3	4	5	6	7	8	9	10	Final
(Nova Scotia) Ian Juurlink	0	0	3	0	0	1	0	0	0	X	4
(Prince Edward Island) Brett Gallant 🔨	1	1	0	2	0	0	0	2	0	X	6

===== A1 vs. B2 =====
September 26, 9:00 AM AT

Sheet 2	1	2	3	4	5	6	7	8	9	10	Final
(New Brunswick) James Grattan 🔨	3	0	0	4	0	0	0	2	0	1	10
(Nova Scotia) Jamie Murphy	0	1	1	0	1	1	1	0	2	0	7

==== Final ====
September 26, 1:00 PM AT

Sheet 4	1	2	3	4	5	6	7	8	9	10	Final
(Prince Edward Island) Brett Gallant	0	1	0	0	1	0	0	2	1	0	5
(New Brunswick) James Grattan 🔨	1	0	2	1	0	1	2	0	0	1	8

== Women ==
=== Teams ===
==== Group A ====
Skip	Vice	Second	Lead	Alternate	Locale
Suzanne Birt	Shelly Bradley	Robyn MacPhee	Leslie MacDougall		Charlottetown, Prince Edward Island
Sandy Comeau	Stacey Leger	Carol Whitaker	Jane Boyle		Fredericton, New Brunswick
Colleen Jones	Kirsten MacDiarmid	Helen Radford	Mary Sue Radford	Katarina Hakansson	Halifax, Nova Scotia
Kelly MacIntosh	Jen Crouse	Julie McEvoy	Sheena Gilman		Halifax, Nova Scotia
Mary Mattatall	Angie Bryant	Lisa MacLeod	Haley Clarke		Halifax, Nova Scotia
Sylvie Robichaud	Danielle Nicholson	Denise Nowlan	Kendra Lister	Marie Richard	Moncton, New Brunswick

==== Group B ====
Skip	Vice	Second	Lead	Alternate	Locale
Melissa Adams	Shannon Tatlock	Jaclyn Crandall	Emily MacRae		Fredericton, New Brunswick
Mary-Anne Arsenault	Stephanie McVicar	Kim Kelly	Jennifer Baxter		Halifax, Nova Scotia
Marie Christianson	Christina Black	Anita Casey	Jane Snyder		Halifax, Nova Scotia
Kim Dolan	Rebecca Jean MacDonald	Sinead Dolan	Nancy Cameron	Michala Robison	Charlottetown, Prince Edward Island
Andrea Kelly	Rebecca Atkinson	Jillian Babin	Jodie DeSolla	Jeanette Murphy	Oromocto, New Brunswick
Heather Smith-Dacey	Danielle Parsons	Blisse Comstock	Teri Lake		Halifax, Nova Scotia

=== Standings ===
==== Group A ====
Skip	W	L	PF	PA	Ends Won	Ends Lost	Blank Ends	Stolen Ends
(Prince Edward Island) Suzanne Birt	5	0	31	18	18	15	3	5
(Nova Scotia) Colleen Jones	4	1	27	20	19	13	6	3
(New Brunswick) Sylvie Robichaud	3	2	22	19	15	13	9	4
(Nova Scotia) Kelly MacIntosh	2	3	23	28	14	20	4	0
(New Brunswick) Sandy Comeau	1	4	19	23	15	18	4	2
(Nova Scotia) Mary Mattatall	0	5	22	36	16	18	2	4

==== Group B ====
Skip	W	L	PF	PA	Ends Won	Ends Lost	Blank Ends	Stolen Ends
(Nova Scotia) Mary-Anne Arsenault	5	0	36	24	22	16	2	5
(New Brunswick) Andrea Kelly	3	2	29	26	21	18	2	8
(New Brunswick) Melissa Adams	2	3	30	26	20	18	2	6
(Prince Edward Island) Kim Dolan	2	3	21	30	17	20	1	3
(Nova Scotia) Heather Smith-Dacey	2	3	29	26	17	22	0	4
(Nova Scotia) Marie Christianson	1	4	26	28	16	19	3	7

=== Results ===
==== Draw 1 ====
September 23, 8:00 AM AT

Sheet 1	1	2	3	4	5	6	7	8	Final
(Prince Edward Island) Suzanne Birt 🔨	0	0	0	0	2	1	0	2	5
(New Brunswick) Sylvie Robichaud	0	1	0	1	0	0	2	0	4

Sheet 2	1	2	3	4	5	6	7	8	Final
(New Brunswick) Sandy Comeau	0	0	1	0	0	0	1	0	2
(Nova Scotia) Colleen Jones 🔨	0	1	0	0	1	0	0	2	4

Sheet 3	1	2	3	4	5	6	7	8	Final
(Nova Scotia) Kelly MacIntosh	0	3	0	4	0	0	0	1	8
(Nova Scotia) Mary Mattatall 🔨	1	0	1	0	2	3	0	0	7

==== Draw 2 ====
September 23, 12:00 PM AT

Sheet 2	1	2	3	4	5	6	7	8	Final
(New Brunswick) Melissa Adams 🔨	1	0	3	0	1	0	0	2	7
(Nova Scotia) Marie Christianson	0	0	0	1	0	3	1	0	5

Sheet 3	1	2	3	4	5	6	7	8	Final
(Prince Edward Island) Kim Dolan	0	0	2	0	1	0	X	X	3
(Nova Scotia) Mary-Anne Arsenault 🔨	1	1	0	4	0	2	X	X	8

Sheet 4	1	2	3	4	5	6	7	8	Final
(Nova Scotia) Heather Smith-Dacey 🔨	0	1	0	0	2	0	2	0	5
(New Brunswick) Andrea Kelly	1	0	2	1	0	1	0	1	6

==== Draw 3 ====
September 23, 4:00 PM AT

Sheet 2	1	2	3	4	5	6	7	8	Final
(Nova Scotia) Mary Mattatall	1	0	1	0	0	1	0	X	3
(New Brunswick) Sylvie Robichaud 🔨	0	1	0	0	3	0	3	X	7

Sheet 3	1	2	3	4	5	6	7	8	Final
(Prince Edward Island) Suzanne Birt	0	1	2	1	1	0	X	X	5
(New Brunswick) Sandy Comeau 🔨	1	0	0	0	0	1	X	X	2

Sheet 4	1	2	3	4	5	6	7	8	Final
(Nova Scotia) Colleen Jones 🔨	1	1	1	0	1	0	2	X	6
(Nova Scotia) Kelly MacIntosh	0	0	0	1	0	2	0	X	3

==== Draw 4 ====
September 23, 8:00 PM AT

Sheet 4	1	2	3	4	5	6	7	8	9	Final
(Nova Scotia) Mary-Anne Arsenault 🔨	2	1	0	0	1	0	2	0	1	7
(New Brunswick) Melissa Adams	0	0	1	1	0	3	0	1	0	6

Sheet 5	1	2	3	4	5	6	7	8	Final
(Nova Scotia) Marie Christianson	1	1	0	0	0	0	2	X	4
(New Brunswick) Andrea Kelly 🔨	0	0	2	1	2	1	0	X	6

==== Draw 5 ====
September 24, 8:00 AM AT

Sheet 1	1	2	3	4	5	6	7	8	Final
(New Brunswick) Sandy Comeau	0	2	2	0	1	0	2	X	7
(Nova Scotia) Mary Mattatall 🔨	1	0	0	1	0	1	0	X	3

Sheet 5	1	2	3	4	5	6	7	8	Final
(Nova Scotia) Heather Smith-Dacey 🔨	0	1	0	1	0	0	2	0	4
(Prince Edward Island) Kim Dolan	1	0	1	0	1	2	0	1	6

==== Draw 6 ====
September 24, 12:00 PM AT

Sheet 2	1	2	3	4	5	6	7	8	Final
(New Brunswick) Sylvie Robichaud 🔨	0	1	1	0	0	1	0	X	3
(Nova Scotia) Kelly MacIntosh	0	0	0	1	0	0	1	X	2

Sheet 3	1	2	3	4	5	6	7	8	9	Final
(New Brunswick) Andrea Kelly	0	2	0	0	2	0	0	1	1	6
(New Brunswick) Melissa Adams 🔨	1	0	1	1	0	2	0	0	0	5

Sheet 5	1	2	3	4	5	6	7	8	Final
(Prince Edward Island) Suzanne Birt	0	2	0	2	0	1	0	1	6
(Nova Scotia) Colleen Jones 🔨	2	0	1	0	1	0	1	0	5

==== Draw 7 ====
September 24, 4:00 PM AT

Sheet 1	1	2	3	4	5	6	7	8	9	Final
(Prince Edward Island) Kim Dolan 🔨	2	0	0	1	0	1	0	1	0	5
(Nova Scotia) Marie Christianson	0	2	1	0	2	0	0	0	1	6

Sheet 2	1	2	3	4	5	6	7	8	9	Final
(Nova Scotia) Heather Smith-Dacey	0	1	0	0	4	0	0	1	0	6
(Nova Scotia) Mary-Anne Arsenault 🔨	1	0	1	1	0	2	1	0	1	7

==== Draw 8 ====
September 24, 8:00 PM AT

Sheet 1	1	2	3	4	5	6	7	8	Final
(Nova Scotia) Kelly MacIntosh	0	2	0	0	1	0	1	0	4
(Prince Edward Island) Suzanne Birt 🔨	1	0	0	2	0	1	0	4	8

Sheet 2	1	2	3	4	5	6	7	8	Final
(Nova Scotia) Colleen Jones 🔨	1	2	0	1	0	1	0	2	7
(Nova Scotia) Mary Mattatall	0	0	1	0	3	0	2	0	6

Sheet 4	1	2	3	4	5	6	7	8	Final
(New Brunswick) Sylvie Robichaud	1	0	0	1	0	0	2	1	5
(New Brunswick) Sandy Comeau 🔨	0	2	0	0	1	1	0	0	4

==== Draw 9 ====
September 25, 8:00 AM AT

Sheet 3	1	2	3	4	5	6	7	8	Final
(Nova Scotia) Mary-Anne Arsenault	0	2	0	2	0	0	3	X	7
(Nova Scotia) Marie Christianson 🔨	0	0	1	0	1	1	0	X	3

Sheet 4	1	2	3	4	5	6	7	8	Final
(New Brunswick) Andrea Kelly	0	1	0	0	1	0	1	1	4
(Prince Edward Island) Kim Dolan 🔨	2	0	1	1	0	1	0	0	5

Sheet 5	1	2	3	4	5	6	7	8	Final
(New Brunswick) Melissa Adams 🔨	1	0	2	0	0	0	1	X	4
(Nova Scotia) Heather Smith-Dacey	0	1	0	3	1	1	0	X	6

==== Draw 10 ====
September 25, 12:00 PM AT

Sheet 3	1	2	3	4	5	6	7	8	Final
(New Brunswick) Sylvie Robichaud	0	0	0	2	0	0	1	X	3
(Nova Scotia) Colleen Jones 🔨	0	0	4	0	0	1	0	X	5

Sheet 5	1	2	3	4	5	6	7	8	Final
(New Brunswick) Sandy Comeau 🔨	1	0	1	0	1	0	1	0	4
(Nova Scotia) Kelly MacIntosh	0	1	0	3	0	1	0	1	6

==== Draw 11 ====
September 25, 4:00 PM AT

Sheet 1	1	2	3	4	5	6	7	8	9	Final
(New Brunswick) Andrea Kelly 🔨	0	0	2	0	2	1	0	1	0	6
(Nova Scotia) Mary-Anne Arsenault	3	0	0	1	0	0	2	0	1	7

Sheet 4	1	2	3	4	5	6	7	8	Final
(Nova Scotia) Mary Mattatall	1	0	1	1	0	0	X	X	3
(Prince Edward Island) Suzanne Birt 🔨	0	3	0	0	3	1	X	X	7

==== Draw 12 ====
September 25, 8:00 PM AT

Sheet 1	1	2	3	4	5	6	7	8	Final
(Nova Scotia) Marie Christianson	1	0	1	1	0	0	0	X	3
(Nova Scotia) Heather Smith-Dacey 🔨	0	2	0	0	1	2	3	X	8

Sheet 2	1	2	3	4	5	6	7	8	Final
(Prince Edward Island) Kim Dolan	0	1	0	0	0	1	0	X	2
(New Brunswick) Melissa Adams 🔨	3	0	1	1	1	0	2	X	8

=== Playoffs ===
SemiFinal
A2	(Nova Scotia) Colleen Jones	7
B1	(Nova Scotia) Mary-Anne Arsenault	4
A1	(Prince Edward Island) Suzanne Birt	6
B2	(New Brunswick) Andrea Kelly	2

Final
A1	(Prince Edward Island) Suzanne Birt	5
A2	(Nova Scotia) Colleen Jones	4

==== Semifinals ====
===== A2 vs. B1 =====
September 26, 9:00 AM AT

Sheet 3	1	2	3	4	5	6	7	8	9	10	Final
(Nova Scotia) Colleen Jones	0	1	0	1	0	3	0	1	1	X	7
(Nova Scotia) Mary-Anne Arsenault 🔨	1	0	1	0	1	0	1	0	0	X	4

===== A1 vs. B2 =====
September 26, 9:00 AM AT

Sheet 4	1	2	3	4	5	6	7	8	9	10	Final
(Prince Edward Island) Suzanne Birt 🔨	0	1	0	1	2	0	2	X	X	X	6
(New Brunswick) Andrea Kelly	0	0	1	0	0	1	0	X	X	X	2

==== Final ====
September 26, 1:00 PM AT

Sheet 2	1	2	3	4	5	6	7	8	9	10	Final
(Prince Edward Island) Suzanne Birt 🔨	1	0	0	0	0	1	0	2	0	1	5
(Nova Scotia) Colleen Jones	0	0	0	1	1	0	0	0	2	0	4
