= Bruce Fummey =

Scottish comedian

Bruce Fummey is a Scottish stand-up comedian known for his irreverent perspective on traditional Scottish culture, with shows themed around topics such as the Jacobite Rising or Burns' "Tam o' Shanter". Previously a physics teacher, and the son of a Ghanaian father and a Scottish mother, Fummey describes himself ironically as "the finest comedian on the Afro-Celtic comedy circuit". He also works as a tour guide and runs and presents on the YouTube Channel "Scotland History Tours". He lives in Blackford.

In January 2023, he appeared on BBC2's Take a Hike.
