= Campmuir =

Village in Scotland

Coordinates: 56.525°N 03.273°W

- Location within Perth and Kinross
- OS grid reference: NO217377
  - Edinburgh: 40 mi (64 km)
- Civil parish: Kettins
- Council area: Perth and Kinross
- Lieutenancy area: Perth and Kinross
- Country: Scotland
- Sovereign state: United Kingdom
- Post town: BLAIRGOWRIE
- Postcode district: PH13
- Dialling code: 01828
- Police: Scotland
- Fire: Scottish
- Ambulance: Scottish
- UK Parliament: Angus and Perthshire Glens
- Scottish Parliament: Perth Mid Scotland and Fife

Campmuir (/kæmpˈmjʊər/) is a small village in the Perth and Kinross area of Scotland.

Campmuir is located less than 1 mile (2 kilometres) south of the main A94 road between Perth and Coupar Angus, lying less than five miles from Coupar Angus. The village is the site of a Roman field camp, discovered in 1754.
