= Dunsinane Curling Club =

Dunsinane Curling Club was founded in 1886 and is in Strathmore Province, Scotland, playing its games in Perth Ice Rink. Outdoor games are played on Dunsinnan Pond, within the grounds of Dunsinnan House, near Kinrossie. Most of the club's members live in around Kinrossie, Campmuir and Burrelton. The current President is Stuart Morris, and Secretary is Jim Ewing.
