= Bonspiel =

Curling tournament

A bonspiel (pronounced /ˈbɒnspiːl/ or /ˈbɒnspil/ or /ˈbɑnspil/) is a curling tournament, consisting of several games, often held on a weekend. Until the 20th century most bonspiels were held outdoors, on a frozen freshwater loch. Today almost all bonspiels are held indoors on specially prepared artificial ice.

As curling became more popular and curling clubs were established, clubs began to play against each other, for example in the first Grand Match in January 1847. As curling spread to North America with Scottish immigrants in the 18th and 19th centuries, bonspiel culture continued to evolve from informal matches to structured tournaments hosted by curling clubs, celebrated with social gatherings and banquets.

== Bonspiels in North America ==
=== Canada ===
Curling Canada, formerly known as the Canadian Curling Association, is the national governing body of the sport in Canada. While bonspiels originated in Scotland, the most notable competitive curling tournament in the world nowadays is the Canadian Men's Curling Championship, The Brier. For many Canadians, this tournament equals or nearly equals the importance of the Olympics and the World Curling Championship. The Canadian Women's Curling Championship is called the Scotties Tournament of Hearts. Several Cashspiels are played in Canada every year, with the most important cashspiels being part of the World Curling Tour (WCT). Many local curling clubs and other organizations in Canada also host casual, social bonspiels indoors, and a few are also held outdoors like the Ironman Outdoor Curling Bonspiel in downtown Winnipeg, Manitoba.

=== United States ===
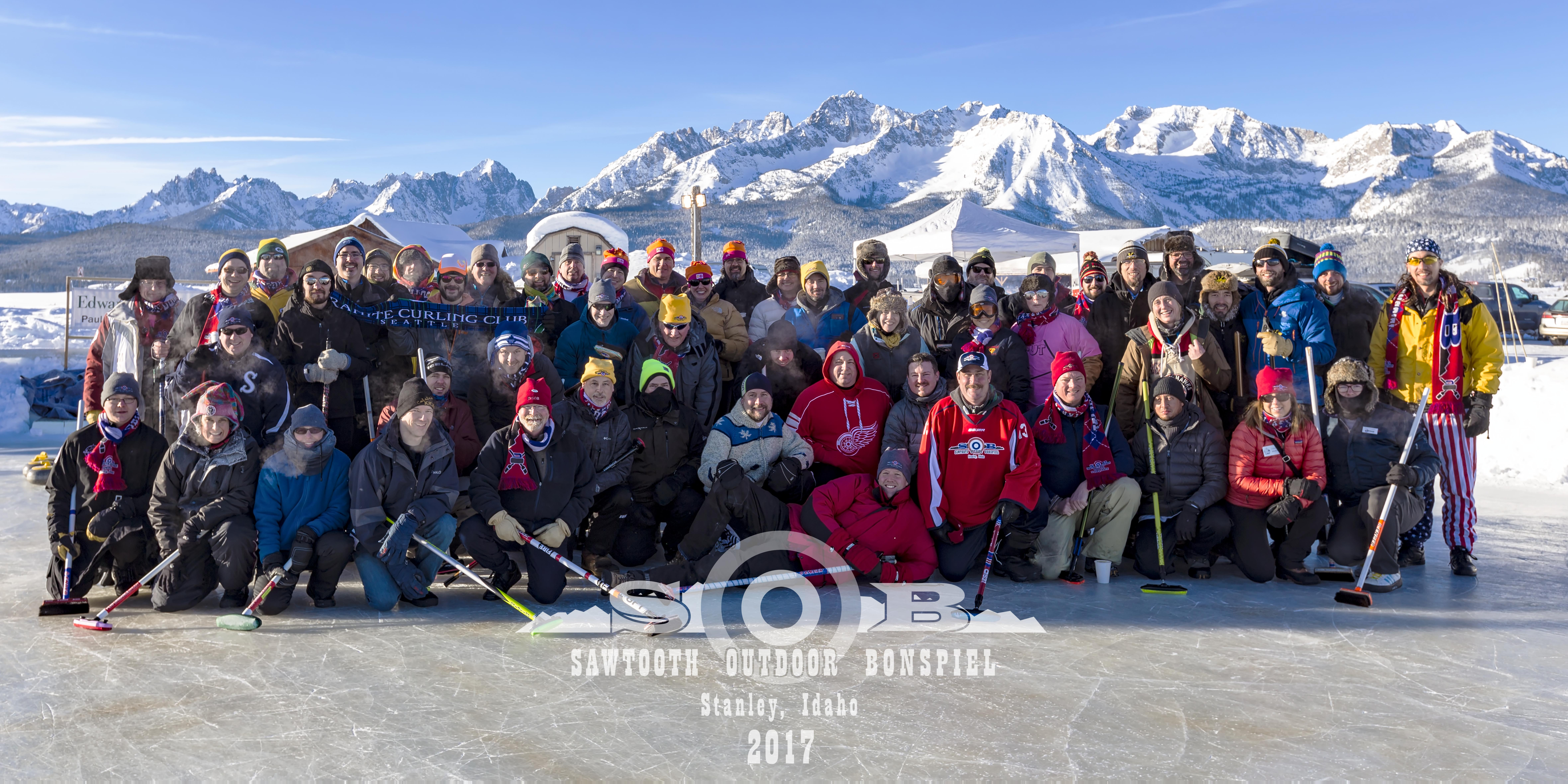

The United States Curling Association (USA Curling) is the national governing body of the sport in the United States. Most bonspiels in the United States are held indoors in dedicated curling facilities, but a few bonspiels are held outdoors if the weather allows it. One example of an outdoor bonspiel is the Sawtooth Outdoor Bonspiel held each January in the Sawtooth Mountain Range of Idaho. Bonspiels are popular throughout the United States during curling season, typically October through April. Some special bonspiels are held in the summer as well as some that are hosted by clubs that play on arena ice as there are usually fewer scheduling conflicts with other sports at the area such as hockey and figure skating.

== Bonspiels in Europe ==
=== Scotland ===
In Scotland, outdoor bonspiels are now very rare; most lochs that formerly hosted bonspiels, such as Loch Earn, rarely freeze over anymore. The Loch of Aboyne was the site of a bonspiel in 1891 and the private railway station, Aboyne Curling Pond was used for the event. The word spiel is sometimes used to refer to an informal curling game, as in parish spiel. The most important Cashspiels in Scotland are part of the Curling Champions Tour (CCT) The Grand Match was last held outdoors in 1979, although it was revived as an indoor tournament in 2000 and has been held every five years since. Between 1853 and 1935 twenty-five 'Grand Matches' or bonspiels were held at the Royal Caledonian Curling Club's own pond at Carsebreck Loch in Perth and Kinross served by the society's own private Carsbreck railway station.

=== Other European countries ===
Dozens of bonspiels are held in European countries every year. Switzerland hosts multiple Curling Champions Tour events.

== Bonspiels elsewhere ==
=== New Zealand ===
Curling bonspiels are held when ice conditions permit in the Maniototo, part of Central Otago in the South Island. The region is one of the few in New Zealand to have conditions suitable for outdoor curling, and is also a fitting site for the sport given that Otago's original European settlers were mainly from Scotland. Several artificial and natural lakes around the towns of Oturehua, Naseby and Patearoa provide good conditions, on average every second or third year.

The national bonspiel has been held when conditions permit since 1879, with Oturehua's Idaburn Dam the venue since 1932. The most recent national bonspiel, the 66th, was held on 13-14 July 2015. Most New Zealand curling clubs are located in Otago, Canterbury, and Southland, and owing to the difficulty of getting teams to the relatively inaccessible venue, it is rare for teams to travel from outside the southern South Island to the bonspiel.

Indoor curling rinks exist in Otago's main centre, Dunedin (at the Dunedin Ice Stadium), and in the towns of Naseby, Otago and Gore, Southland, and also further north in the country's largest city, Auckland. Open air ice rinks exist in Naseby and Alexandra.

== List of notable bonspiels ==
- The largest and oldest indoor bonspiel in the world is the MCA Bonspiel, which is held in and around Winnipeg, Manitoba, Canada every January since 1888.
- The largest outdoor bonspiel in the world, the "Ironman Outdoor Curling Bonspiel" put on by Ironman Outdoor Curling, has been held at or near The Forks in downtown Winnipeg, Manitoba, Canada, every February since 2002. In 2015 there were 72 teams competing on 6 sheets of ice on the Assiniboine River in The Forks port, and in 2016 as the bonspiel continued to grow the event was moved over to the larger Red River to make room for 10 sheets of curling ice. In 2020 the event was played outdoors across the street from the Manitoba Legislative Building in Memorial Provincial Park to honor Manitoba's 150th birthday. The annual event then returned to the Red River but at a new location, the Redboine Boat Club, to allow for even more space and teams and continues to hold the event there each year on the first full weekend of February.
- One of the longest-running outdoor bonspiels in the world, the Bonspiel on the Lake in Invermere, British Columbia, Canada, has been held on Lake Windermere every January since 1983. Each year 64 teams compete.
- The Sawtooth Outdoor Bonspiel (S.O.B.) is held in the Sawtooth Range in Stanley, Idaho every January and held its 13th annual bonspiel in 2026.
- The P-Burg Outdoor Bonspiel is held in Philipsburg, Montana in late January each year since 2023. It is co-hosted by Missoula Curling Club, Last Chance Curling Club of Helena, and Copper City Curling Club of Butte.
- The Bonspiel or the Grand Match, between the north and the south of Scotland, is held on a frozen loch (most recently the Lake of Menteith, Stirling) when the winter is cold enough. It was last held outdoors in 1979.
- The Crush Bonspiel in Placer Valley, California, is notorious for its unique combination of curling tournament play and wine festival. This tournament originated in Vacaville in 2006 but was moved to Roseville in 2012 because of its rising popularity in surrounding areas.
- The Brier (Men's Senior Championship of the Canadian Curling Association) is regarded by most curlers as the world's premier curling championship
- The Tournament of Hearts (Canadian Ladies Curling Association Championship)
- The Men's World Curling Championship (Scotch Cup/Silver Broom) WCF WCC
- The Women's World Curling Championship WCC
- The World Junior Curling Championship (WJCC) WCF
- The Winter Olympics

== Cashspiels and carspiels ==
A cashspiel is a bonspiel played for money, and a carspiel is one played for the prize of an automobile. There are different types of cashspiels, some are small, with prizes in the hundreds of dollars, and others are quite sizeable, with the rewards running into the tens of thousands of dollars.

== Etymology ==
Possibly from Dutch bond "league, association" + spel "game".

== See also ==
- List of English words of Scots origin
- Castle Semple Loch
