= Blackford, Perth and Kinross =

Village in Perth and Kinross, Scotland

Coordinates: 56.259724°N 3.783762°W

Blackford: Scottish Gaelic: Srath Gaoithe
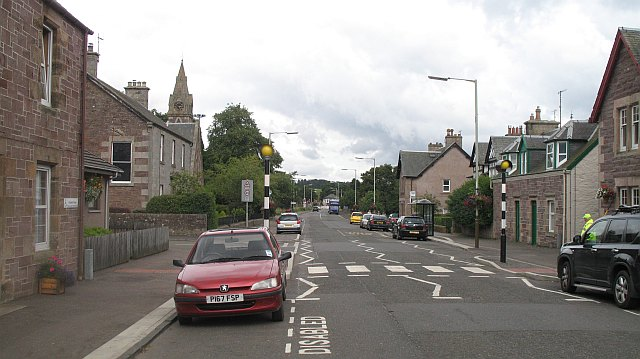
- Blackford

- Location within Perth and Kinross
- Population: 910 (2020)
- OS grid reference: NN896089
- Community council: Blackford
- Council area: Perth and Kinross
- Lieutenancy area: Perth and Kinross
- Country: Scotland
- Sovereign state: United Kingdom
- Post town: Auchterarder
- Postcode district: PH4
- Police: Scotland
- Fire: Scottish
- Ambulance: Scottish
- UK Parliament: Stirling and Strathallan
- Scottish Parliament: Perthshire South and Kinross-shire

Blackford (Scottish Gaelic: Srath Gaoithe) is located in Perth and Kinross, Scotland, approximately 5 miles (8 kilometres) from the town of Auchterarder. The village is located just off the A9 between Perth and Stirling which has been bypassed since 1978. It is home to Highland Spring water and the Tullibardine whisky distillery.

== Prehistory ==
Archaeological work between 2006-08 ahead of the development of a golf course found extensive remains of prehistoric settlements. The settlements were dated to the Middle and Late Bronze Age, with some continued habitation into the Early Iron Age. Most of the structures were probably roundhouses, some were enclosed by palisades, possibly for defense. These communities made their living from a mixed farming economy, with some craft production.

== History ==
Blackford was first known as a ford over the Allan Water. There is a legend that a King Magnus lost his wife Queen Helen in a storm and she is buried on a nearby hill.

Blackford became a popular stopping place especially when Scotland's first public brewery was started. In 1488 King James IV asked the brewery to supply the beer for his coronation.

It was burnt to the ground by Jacobite forces in 1716. The village was becoming more prosperous by the nineteenth century with manufacturing including two breweries and with a healthy agricultural sector based on wool and flax. The Scottish Central Railway built a line between Perth and Stirling with a station at Blackford in 1848.

Local manufacturing declined at the beginning of the 20th century with many people leaving the village. However, many people in the village were employed when the Gleneagles Hotel was opened nearby in 1924. The Tullibardine distillery was built on the site of the former Sharp's Brewery.

== Sport ==
The Blackford Highland Games began in 1870, when its prize money was ten shillings. In 2020, on what was due to be the 150th anniversary of the competition, only one competitor took part due to the COVID-19 pandemic. 20-year-old Alisa Sloan won the Highland dancing competition by default.

The village briefly hosted a senior association football club - Allanvale F.C. - which joined the Scottish Football Association in 1911, and entered the Scottish Qualifying Cup in the next two seasons.

== Geology ==
In 2020 there were 25 earthquakes ranging from 0.4 to 2.5 in magnitude.

== Notable people ==
- Bruce Fummey, comedian, lives in Blackford.
