= Royal Caledonian Curling Club =

Curling club in Edinburgh, Scotland

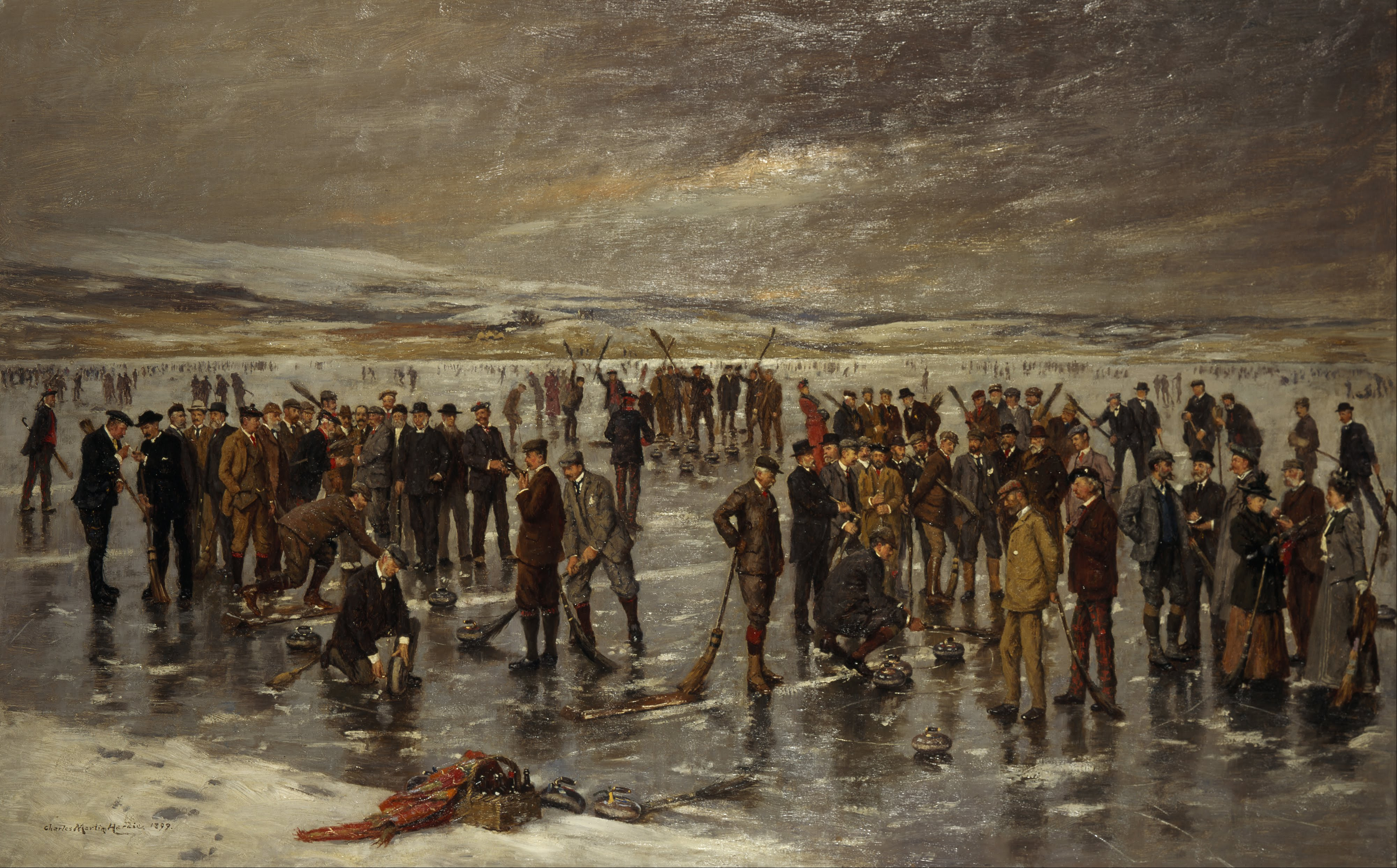
Curling at Carsebreck by Charles Martin Hardie. Commissioned by the club in 1899 to celebrate its Diamond Jubilee. Now in the collections of the National Gallery of Scotland.

The Royal Caledonian Curling Club (RCCC), branded as Scottish Curling is a curling club in Edinburgh, Scotland. It developed the first official rules for the sport, and is the governing body of curling in Scotland. The RCCC was founded on 25 July 1838 in Edinburgh, and granted its royal charter by Queen Victoria in 1843, after she had witnessed a demonstration of the sport played on the polished ballroom floor of Scone Palace the previous year.

The club's objective is "To unite curlers throughout the world into one Brotherhood of the Rink", and it has branches and affiliated associations and clubs in Austria, Belgium, Canada, Denmark, England, Finland, France, Germany, the Netherlands, Ireland, Italy, Japan, Luxembourg, New Zealand, Norway, South Africa, Spain, Switzerland, the United States and Wales.

In 1853 the club established a curling pond for Grand Matches at Carsebreck Loch in Perth and Kinross. This site saw 25 such matches that were served by trains to the club's own private Carsbreck railway station until the last was held at this site in 1935.

== World Curling Federation ==
The World Curling Federation (WCF), the governing body for international curling, originated as a committee (formed in Perth, Scotland in March 1965) of the Royal Caledonian Curling Club, and became an independent organisation in 1982. The WCF officially recognises the Royal Caledonian Curling Club, as the Mother Club of Curling. The WCF is still based in Perth, although between 1994 and 2000 it too was based in Edinburgh with the mother club.

== Championship events ==
Scottish Curling, as the national governing body for curling, holds a number of championship events throughout the year.

- Scottish Curling Men's Championship
- Scottish Curling Women's Championship
- Scottish Curling Mixed Doubles Championship
- Scottish Curling Mixed Championship
- Scottish Curling Senior Championships
- Scottish Curling Senior Mixed Championship
- Scottish Curling Junior Championships
- Scottish Curling Schools Championship
- Scottish Curling Masters Championship
- Scottish Curling Pairs Championship
- Scottish Curling Wheelchair Championship

== See also ==
- List of curling clubs in Scotland
- Curling at the 1924 Winter Olympics
- Grand Match
- Bonspiel
- Sport in Scotland
