= 2012 Prince Edward Island Scotties Tournament of Hearts =

The 2012 Prince Edward Island Scotties Tournament of Hearts, Prince Edward Island's women's provincial curling championship, was held from January 20 to 23 at the Charlottetown Curling Club in Charlottetown, Prince Edward Island, Canada. The winning team of Kim Dolan represented Prince Edward Island at the 2012 Scotties Tournament of Hearts in Red Deer, Alberta, where her team finished with a 3-8 record.

== Teams ==
Skip	Third	Second	Lead	Club(s)
Suzanne Birt	Shelly Bradley	Robyn MacPhee	Leslie MacDougall	Charlottetown Curling Club, Charlottetown
Donna Butler	Carolyn Coulson	Melissa Morrow	Lisa Moerike	Charlottetown Curling Club, Charlottetown
Tammy Dewar	Darlene London	Tracy Yorston-Campell	Gail Greene	Montague Curling Club, Montague
Kim Dolan	Rebecca Jean MacDonald	Sinead Dolan	Nancy Cameron	Charlottetown Curling Club, Charlottetown
Sarah Fullerton	Michelle McQuaid	Sara MacRae	Hillary Thompson	Charlottetown Curling Club, Charlottetown; Cornwall Curling Club, Cornwall
Meaghan Hughes	Stefanie Clark	Jackie Reid	Tricia Affleck	Charlottetown Curling Club, Charlottetown

== Standings ==
Skip (Club)	W	L	PF	PA	Ends Won	Ends Lost	Blank Ends	Stolen Ends
Meaghan Hughes (Charlottetown)	4	1	42	27	26	17	5	9
Sarah Fullerton (Charlottetown/Cornwall)	4	1	37	33	23	23	4	7
Kim Dolan (Charlottetown)	3	2	30	27	22	21	7	5
Suzanne Birt (Charlottetown)	2	3	31	34	20	24	3	8
Tammy Dewar (Montague)	1	4	24	39	21	23	2	6
Donna Butler (Charlottetown)	1	4	32	35	22	25	5	10

* Hughes was awarded first place by virtue of a round robin win over Fullerton.

== Results ==
=== Draw 1 ===
January 20, 11:00 AM

Sheet 2	1	2	3	4	5	6	7	8	9	10	11	Final
Fullerton	0	0	1	0	0	2	0	2	0	1	2	8
Dolan 🔨	1	0	0	0	2	0	1	0	2	0	0	6

Sheet 3	1	2	3	4	5	6	7	8	9	10	Final
Hughes 🔨	2	0	2	2	2	0	0	3	X	X	11
Dewar	0	1	0	0	0	1	1	0	X	X	3

Sheet 4	1	2	3	4	5	6	7	8	9	10	Final
Butler	0	0	0	1	1	1	0	2	1	X	6
Birt 🔨	2	1	2	0	0	0	2	0	0	X	7

=== Draw 2 ===
January 20, 4:00 PM

Sheet 2	1	2	3	4	5	6	7	8	9	10	Final
Birt 🔨	2	0	1	0	2	0	2	2	0	X	9
Dewar	0	2	0	2	0	1	0	0	1	X	6

Sheet 3	1	2	3	4	5	6	7	8	9	10	11	Final
Butler 🔨	0	1	0	2	1	0	0	0	0	1	0	5
Fullerton	0	0	0	0	0	1	1	1	2	0	1	6

Sheet 4	1	2	3	4	5	6	7	8	9	10	Final
Dolan 🔨	0	1	0	0	0	2	0	1	0	2	6
Hughes	1	0	0	0	1	0	1	0	2	0	5

=== Draw 3 ===
January 21, 1:30 PM

Sheet 2	1	2	3	4	5	6	7	8	9	10	Final
Dolan 🔨	2	0	1	1	0	1	0	0	0	1	6
Birt	0	0	0	0	2	0	1	1	1	0	5

Sheet 3	1	2	3	4	5	6	7	8	9	10	Final
Hughes 🔨	1	0	3	0	3	0	1	0	2	X	10
Fullerton	0	2	0	1	0	1	0	2	0	X	6

Sheet 4	1	2	3	4	5	6	7	8	9	10	11	Final
Butler	0	0	0	2	1	1	3	0	0	0	0	7
Dewar 🔨	0	1	3	0	0	0	0	1	1	1	1	8

=== Draw 4 ===
January 21, 6:30 PM

Sheet 2	1	2	3	4	5	6	7	8	9	10	11	Final
Hughes	0	0	1	0	1	0	0	2	1	3	1	9
Butler 🔨	2	2	0	1	0	0	3	0	0	0	0	8

Sheet 3	1	2	3	4	5	6	7	8	9	10	Final
Dolan 🔨	1	0	1	2	0	1	0	2	0	X	7
Dewar	0	0	0	0	1	0	1	0	1	X	3

Sheet 4	1	2	3	4	5	6	7	8	9	10	Final
Birt 🔨	1	0	0	0	2	1	0	1	1	0	6
Fullerton	0	1	3	2	0	0	2	0	0	1	9

=== Draw 5 ===
January 22, 10:00 AM

Sheet 2	1	2	3	4	5	6	7	8	9	10	Final
Fullerton 🔨	0	1	1	0	0	2	0	4	0	X	8
Dewar	1	0	0	1	1	0	1	0	2	X	6

Sheet 3	1	2	3	4	5	6	7	8	9	10	Final
Hughes 🔨	0	0	1	1	0	1	0	3	1	X	7
Birt	0	3	0	0	0	0	1	0	0	X	4

Sheet 4	1	2	3	4	5	6	7	8	9	10	Final
Dolan	0	1	0	1	0	0	2	1	0	0	5
Butler 🔨	1	0	1	0	0	1	0	0	2	1	6

== Playoffs ==
Semifinal			Final
			1	Meaghan Hughes	4
2	Sarah Fullerton	9	3	Kim Dolan	6
3	Kim Dolan	10

=== Semifinal ===
January 22, 3:00 PM

Sheet 4	1	2	3	4	5	6	7	8	9	10	11	Final
Fullerton 🔨	1	0	0	5	0	2	0	0	0	1	0	9
Dolan	0	0	1	0	3	0	1	1	3	0	1	10

=== Final ===
January 23, 6:30 PM

Sheet 3	1	2	3	4	5	6	7	8	9	10	Final
Hughes 🔨	0	1	0	0	0	1	0	0	2	X	4
Dolan	0	0	1	1	0	0	3	1	0	X	6

2012 Prince Edward Island Scotties Tournament of Hearts

Kim Dolan
Prince Edward Island Provincial Championship title
