= 2019 Prince Edward Island Scotties Tournament of Hearts =

2019 Prince Edward Island Scotties
- Host city: Alberton, Prince Edward Island
- Arena: Western Community Curling Club
- Dates: January 9-13
- Winner: Suzanne Birt
- Curling club: Charlottetown CC, Charlottetown, PEI
- Skip: Suzanne Birt
- Third: Marie Christianson
- Second: Meaghan Hughes
- Lead: Michelle McQuaid
- Coach: Mitchell O'Shea
- Finalist: Veronica Smith

The 2019 Prince Edward Island Scotties Tournament of Hearts, the provincial women's curling championship for Prince Edward Island, was held from January 9–13 at the Western Community Curling Club in Alberton, Prince Edward Island. The winning Suzanne Birt team represented Prince Edward Island at the 2019 Scotties Tournament of Hearts, Canada's national women's curling championship. The event was held in conjunction with the 2019 PEI Tankard, the provincial men's championship.

== Teams Entered ==
Skip	Third	Second	Lead	Club(s)
Suzanne Birt	Marie Christianson	Meaghan Hughes	Michelle McQuaid	Charlottetown Curling Complex, Charlottetown
Tammy Dewar	Darlene MacLeod-London	Robyn MacDonald	Gail Greene	Montague Curling Rink, Montague
Sarah Fullerton	Amanda Colter	Anita Casey	Aleya Quilty	Charlottetown Curling Complex, Charlottetown; Silver Fox Curling Club, Summerside
Lisa Jackson	Carolyn Coulson	Jaclyn Reid	Jodi Murphy	Charlottetown Curling Complex, Charlottetown
Chloé McCloskey	Kristie Rogers	Cynthia Pearson	Meghan Ching	Charlottetown Curling Complex, Charlottetown
Melissa Morrow	Darcee Birch	Lindsey Spencer	Miranda Ellis	Silver Fox Curling Club, Summerside
Veronica Smith	Jane DiCarlo	Sabrina Smith	Whitney Jenkins	Cornwall Curling Club, Cornwall

== Knockout draw brackets ==
=== A Event ===
Quarterfinals
Veronica Smith	8
Lisa Jackson	5
Sarah Fullerton	6
Chloé McCloskey	4
Melissa Morrow	10
Tammy Dewar	4

Semifinals
Veronica Smith	7
Sarah Fullerton	5
Suzanne Birt	3
Melissa Morrow	13

Final
Veronica Smith	8
Melissa Morrow	2

=== B Event ===
B Event
Lisa Jackson	7
Chloé McCloskey	2

Quarterfinals
Tammy Dewar	5
Sarah Fullerton	9
Suzanne Birt	9
Lisa Jackson	5

Semifinals
Sarah Fullerton	7
Melissa Morrow	3
Suzanne Birt	6
Veronica Smith	7

B Final
Sarah Fullerton	4
Veronica Smith	3

=== C Event ===
C Event
Chloé McCloskey	7
Tammy Dewar	5

Quarterfinals
Lisa Jackson	1
Suzanne Birt	11
Melissa Morrow	8
Chloé McCloskey	1

Semifinals
Suzanne Birt	8
Sarah Fullerton	2
Melissa Morrow	3
Veronica Smith	10

C Final
Suzanne Birt	9
Veronica Smith	7

== Playoffs ==
Semifinal			Final
			A	Veronica Smith	4
B	Sarah Fullerton	6	C	Suzanne Birt	10
C	Suzanne Birt	7

=== Playoff #1 ===
Sunday, January 13, 8:00am

Sheet 2	1	2	3	4	5	6	7	8	9	10	Final
Sarah Fullerton 🔨	0	1	0	0	0	2	0	1	0	2	6
Suzanne Birt	1	0	0	0	3	0	1	0	2	0	7

=== Playoff #2 ===
Sunday, January 13, 1:00pm

Sheet 1	1	2	3	4	5	6	7	8	9	10	Final
Veronica Smith 🔨	0	1	0	0	1	0	0	2	X	X	4
Suzanne Birt	1	0	2	2	0	3	2	0	X	X	10

2019 Prince Edward Island Scotties Tournament of Hearts

Suzanne Birt
10th Prince Edward Island Provincial Championship title
