= 2014 Prince Edward Island Scotties Tournament of Hearts =

- Host city: Charlottetown, Prince Edward Island
- Arena: Charlottetown Curling Complex
- Dates: January 9–12
- Winner: Kim Dolan
- Curling club: Charlottetown CC, Charlottetown
- Skip: Kim Dolan
- Third: Rebecca Jean MacDonald
- Second: Sinead Dolan
- Lead: Michala Robison
- Alternate: Jackie Reid
- Finalist: Kathy O'Rourke

The 2014 Prince Edward Island Scotties Tournament of Hearts, the provincial women's curling championship for Prince Edward Island, was held from January 9 to 12 at the Charlottetown Curling Complex in Charlottetown. The winning team, skipped by Kim Dolan, represented Prince Edward Island at the 2014 Scotties Tournament of Hearts in Montreal.

== Teams ==
Skip	Third	Second	Lead	Alternate	Club(s)
Shirley Berry	Sandy Hope	Shelley Ebbett	Arleen Harris		Cornwall Curling Club, Cornwall; Silver Fox Curling & Yacht Club, Summerside
Suzanne Birt	Shelly Bradley	Michelle McQuaid	Susan McInnis		Charlottetown Curling Complex, Charlottetown
Kim Dolan	Rebecca Jean MacDonald	Sinead Dolan	Michala Robison	Jackie Reid	Charlottetown Curling Complex, Charlottetown
Lisa Jackson	Carolyn Coulson	Melissa Morrow	Michelle MacIntyre		Charlottetown Curling Complex, Charlottetown
Robyn Green (fourth)	Meaghan Hughes	Kathy O'Rourke (skip)	Tricia Affleck	Stefanie Clark	Charlottetown Curling Complex, Charlottetown

== Round-robin standings ==
Final round-robin standings

Key
Teams to Playoffs

Skip (Club)	W	L
Kathy O'Rourke (Charlottetown)	4	0
Shirley Berry (Cornwall/Silver Fox)	2	2
Kim Dolan (Charlottetown)	2	2
Lisa Jackson (Charlottetown)	1	3
Suzanne Birt (Charlottetown)	1	3

== Round-robin results ==
=== Draw 1 ===
Thursday, January 9, 2:00 pm

Sheet 2	1	2	3	4	5	6	7	8	9	10	11	Final
Shirley Berry 🔨	1	1	0	1	0	1	0	1	1	0	1	7
Kim Dolan	0	0	1	0	1	0	3	0	0	1	0	6

Sheet 3	1	2	3	4	5	6	7	8	9	10	11	Final
Kathy O'Rourke 🔨	1	0	0	0	0	3	1	0	1	0	2	8
Suzanne Birt	0	1	0	1	0	0	0	2	0	2	0	6

=== Draw 2 ===
Thursday, January 9, 7:00 pm

Sheet 3	1	2	3	4	5	6	7	8	9	10	Final
Shirley Berry 🔨	0	0	1	1	0	3	2	1	0	X	8
Lisa Jackson	1	1	0	0	2	0	0	0	1	X	5

Sheet 4	1	2	3	4	5	6	7	8	9	10	Final
Kim Dolan	0	0	0	2	0	1	0	1	0	X	4
Kathy O'Rourke 🔨	1	1	0	0	2	0	1	0	3	X	8

=== Draw 3 ===
Friday, January 10, 2:00 pm

Sheet 2	1	2	3	4	5	6	7	8	9	10	Final
Kathy O'Rourke 🔨	0	1	2	0	1	0	3	0	X	X	7
Lisa Jackson	0	0	0	0	0	1	0	0	X	X	1

Sheet 3	1	2	3	4	5	6	7	8	9	10	Final
Kim Dolan 🔨	1	0	1	0	0	2	1	3	0	X	8
Suzanne Birt	0	2	0	0	2	0	0	0	2	X	6

=== Draw 4 ===
Friday, January 10, 7:00 pm

Sheet 3	1	2	3	4	5	6	7	8	9	10	Final
Shirley Berry 🔨	1	0	0	1	0	0	1	0	X	X	3
Kathy O'Rourke	0	0	2	0	2	2	0	2	X	X	8

Sheet 4	1	2	3	4	5	6	7	8	9	10	Final
Suzanne Birt 🔨	0	0	1	0	2	0	2	0	2	0	7
Lisa Jackson	1	0	0	3	0	2	0	1	0	2	9

=== Draw 5 ===
Saturday, January 11, 2:00 pm

Sheet 2	1	2	3	4	5	6	7	8	9	10	Final
Shirley Berry	0	0	0	1	0	1	X	X	X	X	2
Suzanne Birt 🔨	2	0	1	0	5	0	X	X	X	X	8

Sheet 4	1	2	3	4	5	6	7	8	9	10	Final
Kim Dolan	0	0	1	1	2	1	0	2	X	X	7
Lisa Jackson 🔨	0	2	0	0	0	0	0	0	X	X	2

== Playoffs ==
Semifinal			Final
			1	Kathy O'Rourke	4
2	Shirley Berry	4	3	Kim Dolan	6
3	Kim Dolan	8

=== Semifinal ===
Saturday, January 11, 7:00 pm

Sheet 4	1	2	3	4	5	6	7	8	9	10	Final
Shirley Berry 🔨	0	0	1	0	2	0	0	1	0	X	4
Kim Dolan	0	2	0	2	0	0	3	0	1	X	8

=== Final ===
Sunday, January 12, 2:00 pm

Sheet 2	1	2	3	4	5	6	7	8	9	10	11	Final
Kathy O'Rourke 🔨	0	0	0	0	0	1	0	1	0	2	0	4
Kim Dolan	0	0	0	0	0	0	2	0	2	0	2	6

2014 Prince Edward Island Scotties Tournament of Hearts

Kim Dolan
11th Prince Edward Island Provincial Championship title
