= 2016 Prince Edward Island Scotties Tournament of Hearts =

- Host city: Montague, Prince Edward Island
- Arena: Montague Curling Club
- Dates: January 15–18
- Winner: Suzanne Birt
- Curling club: Charlottetown CC, Charlottetown
- Skip: Suzanne Birt
- Third: Robyn Green
- Second: Meaghan Hughes
- Lead: Marie Christianson
- Finalist: Kim Dolan

The 2016 Prince Edward Island Scotties Tournament of Hearts, the provincial women's curling championship of Prince Edward Island, was held from January 15 to 18 at the Montague Curling Club in Montague, Prince Edward Island. The winning Suzanne Birt rink represented Prince Edward Island at the 2016 Scotties Tournament of Hearts in Grande Prairie, Alberta.

== Teams ==
Skip	Third	Second	Lead	Alternate	Club(s)
Suzanne Birt	Robyn Green	Meaghan Hughes	Marie Christianson		Charlottetown Curling Complex, Charlottetown
Shelly Bradley	Veronica Smith	Jane DiCarlo	Tricia MacGregor	Susan McInnis	Charlottetown Curling Complex, Charlottetown
Tammy Dewar	Darlene MacLeod London	Robyn MacDonald	Gail Greene		Montague Curling Club, Montague
Kim Dolan	Rebecca Jean MacDonald	Sinead Dolan	Michala Robison	Jackie Reid	Charlottetown Curling Complex, Charlottetown
Sarah Fullerton	Robyn Wile	Emily Gray	Whitney Young	Megan Wile	Charlottetown Curling Complex, Charlottetown
Lisa Jackson	Carolyn Coulson	Melissa Morrow	Jodi Murphy		Charlottetown Curling Complex, Charlottetown

== Knockout Draw Brackets ==
=== A Event ===
Quarterfinals
Lisa Jackson	10
Sarah Fullerton	5
Tammy Dewar	7
Shelly Bradley	6

Semifinals
Suzanne Birt	9
Lisa Jackson	6
Kim Dolan	7
Tammy Dewar	4

Final
Suzanne Birt	8
Kim Dolan	5

=== B Event ===
Quarterfinals
Sarah Fullerton	8
Tammy Dewar	5
Shelly Bradley	5
Lisa Jackson	6

Semifinals
Suzanne Birt	9
Sarah Fullerton	3
Kim Dolan	8
Lisa Jackson	3

Final
Suzanne Birt	10
Kim Dolan	4

=== C Event ===
Quarterfinals
Shelly Bradley	8
Sarah Fullerton	6
Tammy Dewar	4
Lisa Jackson	9

Semifinals
Kim Dolan	8
Shelly Bradley	4
Suzanne Birt	5
Lisa Jackson	8

Final
Kim Dolan	7
Lisa Jackson	5

== Playoffs ==
Birt must be defeated twice.

Semifinal		Final
		Suzanne Birt	5
Suzanne Birt	6	Kim Dolan	4
Kim Dolan	8

=== Semifinal ===
Monday, January 18, 9:00 am

Sheet 2	1	2	3	4	5	6	7	8	9	10	Final
Suzanne Birt 🔨	2	0	0	1	0	1	1	1	0	0	6
Kim Dolan	0	2	0	0	3	0	0	0	2	1	8

=== Final ===
Monday, January 18, 2:00 pm

Sheet 3	1	2	3	4	5	6	7	8	9	10	Final
Suzanne Birt 🔨	0	1	0	1	1	0	0	2	0	0	5
Kim Dolan	0	0	1	0	0	1	0	0	1	1	4

2016 Prince Edward Island Scotties Tournament of Hearts

Suzanne Birt
9th Prince Edward Island Provincial Championship title
