= 2012 The Masters Grand Slam of Curling – Women's event =

2012 The Masters Grand Slam of Curling Women's event
- Host city: Brantford, Ontario; Paris, Ontario
- Arena: Wayne Gretzky Sports Centre; Brantford Golf & Curling Club; Paris Curling Club
- Dates: November 14–18
- Winner: (Ontario) Rachel Homan
- Curling club: Ottawa CC, Ottawa
- Skip: Rachel Homan
- Third: Emma Miskew
- Second: Alison Kreviazuk
- Lead: Lisa Weagle
- Finalist: (Manitoba) Chelsea Carey

The women's event of the 2012 Masters Grand Slam of Curling was held from November 14 to 18 at the Wayne Gretzky Sports Centre, the Brantford Golf & Curling Club, and the Paris Curling Club in Brantford and Paris, Ontario as part of the 2012–13 World Curling Tour. The majority of the women's Tier I round robin games was held at the Brantford Golf & Curling Club, while the remainder of the Tier I games and the playoffs round games were held at the Wayne Gretzky Sports Centre. The women's Tier II games were held at the Paris Curling Club, and the women's Tier II playoffs qualifiers were held at the Brantford Golf & Curling Club. It was held as the fourth Grand Slam on the women's tour.

In the final, Rachel Homan of Ontario defeated Chelsea Carey of Manitoba with a score of 8–3.

The event is split up into two tiers, with 18 teams in Tier I and 16 teams in Tier II. The Tier I teams were divided into 3 pools of 6 teams which played in a round robin, while the Tier II teams played off in a triple knockout event. 8 Tier II teams qualified for a playoff to determine which two teams would enter the playoffs along with six Tier I teams.

== Tier I ==
=== Teams ===
The teams are listed as follows:

Skip	Third	Second	Lead	Locale
Erika Brown	Debbie McCormick	Jessica Schultz	Ann Swisshelm	(United States) Madison, Wisconsin
Chelsea Carey	Kristy McDonald	Kristen Foster	Lindsay Titheridge	Winnipeg, Manitoba
Laura Crocker	Sarah Wilkes	Rebecca Pattison	Jen Gates	Edmonton, Alberta
Rachel Homan	Emma Miskew	Alison Kreviazuk	Lisa Weagle	Ottawa, Ontario
Michèle Jäggi	Marisa Winkelhausen	Stéphanie Jäggi	Malanie Barbezät	Bern, Switzerland
Shannon Kleibrink	Bronwen Webster	Kalynn Park	Chelsey Matson	Calgary, Alberta
Kaitlyn Lawes	Kirsten Wall	Jill Officer	Dawn Askin	Winnipeg, Manitoba
Stefanie Lawton	Sherry Anderson	Sherri Singler	Marliese Kasner	Saskatoon, Saskatchewan
Sherry Middaugh	Jo-Ann Rizzo	Lee Merklinger	Leigh Armstrong	Coldwater, Ontario
Eve Muirhead	Anna Sloan	Vicki Adams	Claire Hamilton	Stirling, Scotland
Heather Nedohin	Beth Iskiw	Jessica Mair	Laine Peters	Edmonton, Alberta
Mirjam Ott	Carmen Schäfer	Carmen Küng	Janine Greiner	Davos, Switzerland
Cathy Overton-Clapham	Jenna Loder	Ashley Howard	Breanne Meakin	Winnipeg, Manitoba
Kelly Scott	Jeanna Schraeder	Sasha Carter	Sarah Wazney	Kelowna, British Columbia
Anna Sidorova	Liudmila Privivkova	Margarita Fomina	Ekaterina Galkina	Moscow, Russia
Valerie Sweeting	Dana Ferguson	Joanne Taylor	Rachelle Pidherny	Edmonton, Alberta
Silvana Tirinzoni	Marlene Albrecht	Esther Neuenschwander	Sandra Gantenbein	Switzerland
Crystal Webster	Erin Carmody	Geri-Lynn Ramsay	Samantha Preston	Calgary, Alberta

=== Round Robin Standings ===
Final Round Robin Standings

Key
Teams to Playoffs
Teams to Tiebreakers

Pool A	W	L
(Switzerland) Silvana Tirinzoni	4	1
(Manitoba) Kaitlyn Lawes	3	2
(United States) Erika Brown	2	3
(Switzerland) Mirjam Ott	2	3
(Alberta) Valerie Sweeting	2	3
(Alberta) Crystal Webster	2	3

Pool B	W	L
(Ontario) Rachel Homan	5	0
(Alberta) Shannon Kleibrink	3	2
(Ontario) Sherry Middaugh	3	2
(Scotland) Eve Muirhead	3	2
(Manitoba) Cathy Overton-Clapham	1	4
(Alberta) Laura Crocker	0	5

Pool C	W	L
(Manitoba) Chelsea Carey	4	1
(Russia) Anna Sidorova	3	2
(Switzerland) Michèle Jäggi	2	3
(Saskatchewan) Stefanie Lawton	2	3
(Alberta) Heather Nedohin	2	3
(British Columbia) Kelly Scott	2	3

=== Round robin results ===
All draw times are listed in Eastern Standard Time.

==== Draw 1 ====
Thursday, November 15, 9:00

Sheet A	1	2	3	4	5	6	7	8	Final
(Ontario) Sherry Middaugh 🔨	0	1	0	1	3	0	2	1	8
(Alberta) Laura Crocker	0	0	3	0	0	2	0	0	5

Sheet B	1	2	3	4	5	6	7	8	Final
(Manitoba) Cathy Overton-Clapham 🔨	1	0	0	1	0	1	0	X	3
(Ontario) Rachel Homan	0	1	3	0	2	0	2	X	8

Sheet C	1	2	3	4	5	6	7	8	9	Final
(Scotland) Eve Muirhead 🔨	1	1	0	1	0	1	0	1	2	7
(Alberta) Shannon Kleibrink	0	0	1	0	2	0	2	0	0	5

Sheet D	1	2	3	4	5	6	7	8	Final
(Manitoba) Kaitlyn Lawes 🔨	0	2	0	0	1	0	2	1	6
(United States) Erika Brown	1	0	1	1	0	2	0	0	5

Sheet E	1	2	3	4	5	6	7	8	Final
(Switzerland) Mirjam Ott	0	0	2	0	1	0	2	0	5
(Alberta) Valerie Sweeting 🔨	1	1	0	3	0	2	0	0	7

Sheet F	1	2	3	4	5	6	7	8	9	Final
(Alberta) Crystal Webster 🔨	2	1	0	0	0	1	0	1	0	5
(Switzerland) Silvana Tirinzoni	0	0	0	1	1	0	3	0	1	6

==== Draw 2 ====
Thursday, November 15, 12:30

Sheet A	1	2	3	4	5	6	7	8	Final
(Alberta) Heather Nedohin 🔨	0	0	0	2	0	1	0	0	3
(British Columbia) Kelly Scott	0	1	0	0	2	0	0	1	4

Sheet B	1	2	3	4	5	6	7	8	Final
(Saskatchewan) Stefanie Lawton	0	1	1	0	2	0	1	1	6
(Switzerland) Michèle Jäggi 🔨	1	0	0	2	0	1	0	0	4

Sheet C	1	2	3	4	5	6	7	8	Final
(Manitoba) Chelsea Carey 🔨	2	0	1	0	0	1	0	1	5
(Russia) Anna Sidorova	0	1	0	1	0	0	1	0	3

Sheet D	1	2	3	4	5	6	7	8	Final
(Ontario) Sherry Middaugh 🔨	1	0	2	0	3	0	0	X	6
(Alberta) Shannon Kleibrink	0	1	0	2	0	2	3	X	8

Sheet E	1	2	3	4	5	6	7	8	Final
(Ontario) Rachel Homan	0	2	0	1	2	2	0	X	7
(Alberta) Laura Crocker 🔨	2	0	1	0	0	0	1	X	4

Sheet F	1	2	3	4	5	6	7	8	Final
(Manitoba) Cathy Overton-Clapham	0	1	0	2	0	X	X	X	3
(Scotland) Eve Muirhead 🔨	5	0	1	0	3	X	X	X	9

==== Draw 3 ====
Thursday, November 15, 16:00

Sheet A	1	2	3	4	5	6	7	8	Final
(Manitoba) Kaitlyn Lawes	0	2	2	2	1	X	X	X	7
(Alberta) Valerie Sweeting 🔨	1	0	0	0	0	X	X	X	1

Sheet B	1	2	3	4	5	6	7	8	Final
(Switzerland) Mirjam Ott	0	0	0	0	2	0	2	0	4
(Switzerland) Silvana Tirinzoni 🔨	0	0	0	3	0	1	0	1	5

Sheet C	1	2	3	4	5	6	7	8	Final
(Alberta) Crystal Webster 🔨	0	1	0	2	0	2	0	X	5
(United States) Erika Brown	1	0	3	0	1	0	2	X	7

Sheet D	1	2	3	4	5	6	7	8	Final
(Alberta) Heather Nedohin 🔨	1	0	1	0	2	0	3	X	7
(Manitoba) Chelsea Carey	0	2	0	1	0	1	0	X	4

Sheet E	1	2	3	4	5	6	7	8	Final
(British Columbia) Kelly Scott	0	1	1	2	0	0	0	2	6
(Switzerland) Michèle Jäggi 🔨	2	0	0	0	1	2	0	0	5

Sheet F	1	2	3	4	5	6	7	8	Final
(Saskatchewan) Stefanie Lawton 🔨	1	0	3	0	0	0	2	0	6
(Russia) Anna Sidorova	0	3	0	1	3	1	0	1	9

==== Draw 4 ====
Thursday, November 15, 19:30

Sheet A	1	2	3	4	5	6	7	8	Final
(Scotland) Eve Muirhead	0	1	0	1	0	X	X	X	2
(Ontario) Rachel Homan 🔨	1	0	2	0	5	X	X	X	8

Sheet B	1	2	3	4	5	6	7	8	Final
(Alberta) Laura Crocker	0	0	2	0	0	X	X	X	2
(Alberta) Shannon Kleibrink 🔨	2	2	0	2	2	X	X	X	8

Sheet C	1	2	3	4	5	6	7	8	Final
(Ontario) Sherry Middaugh	0	3	0	0	2	2	0	X	7
(Manitoba) Cathy Overton-Clapham 🔨	1	0	1	1	0	0	2	X	5

Sheet D	1	2	3	4	5	6	7	8	Final
(Alberta) Crystal Webster 🔨	2	2	0	3	X	X	X	X	7
(Alberta) Valerie Sweeting	0	0	1	0	X	X	X	X	1

Sheet E	1	2	3	4	5	6	7	8	Final
(United States) Erika Brown	1	0	1	0	3	1	1	X	7
(Switzerland) Silvana Tirinzoni	0	3	0	1	0	0	0	X	4

Sheet F	1	2	3	4	5	6	7	8	Final
(Switzerland) Mirjam Ott	0	1	0	0	2	0	1	0	4
(Manitoba) Kaitlyn Lawes 🔨	1	0	2	1	0	2	0	2	8

==== Draw 5 ====
Friday, November 16, 8:30

Sheet A	1	2	3	4	5	6	7	8	Final
(Manitoba) Chelsea Carey 🔨	2	0	3	0	0	2	1	X	8
(Switzerland) Michèle Jäggi	0	3	0	0	1	0	0	X	4

Sheet B	1	2	3	4	5	6	7	8	Final
(Russia) Anna Sidorova 🔨	0	2	0	0	0	0	0	4	6
(Alberta) Heather Nedohin	0	0	1	1	1	0	0	0	3

Sheet C	1	2	3	4	5	6	7	8	Final
(British Columbia) Kelly Scott	0	1	0	1	0	0	X	X	2
(Saskatchewan) Stefanie Lawton 🔨	1	0	3	0	3	1	X	X	8

Sheet D	1	2	3	4	5	6	7	8	Final
(Scotland) Eve Muirhead	0	0	2	0	0	0	1	2	5
(Alberta) Laura Crocker 🔨	0	2	0	0	1	1	0	0	4

Sheet E	1	2	3	4	5	6	7	8	Final
(Manitoba) Cathy Overton-Clapham 🔨	3	0	2	0	0	2	0	0	7
(Alberta) Shannon Kleibrink	0	2	0	2	4	0	2	2	12

Sheet F	1	2	3	4	5	6	7	8	Final
(Ontario) Rachel Homan 🔨	0	1	0	0	3	0	2	X	6
(Ontario) Sherry Middaugh	0	0	0	1	0	1	0	X	2

==== Draw 6 ====
Friday, November 16, 12:00

Sheet A	1	2	3	4	5	6	7	8	9	Final
(Switzerland) Mirjam Ott 🔨	2	0	1	0	0	2	1	1	2	9
(United States) Erika Brown	0	2	0	3	2	0	0	0	0	7

Sheet B	1	2	3	4	5	6	7	8	Final
(Manitoba) Kaitlyn Lawes 🔨	1	0	0	0	0	2	0	X	3
(Alberta) Crystal Webster	0	1	2	1	1	0	2	X	7

Sheet C	1	2	3	4	5	6	7	8	Final
(Switzerland) Silvana Tirinzoni	0	0	1	0	1	1	3	0	6
(Alberta) Valerie Sweeting 🔨	1	2	0	1	0	0	0	1	5

Sheet D	1	2	3	4	5	6	7	8	Final
(Russia) Anna Sidorova 🔨	0	1	1	0	2	0	1	X	5
(British Columbia) Kelly Scott	0	0	0	1	0	1	0	X	3

Sheet E	1	2	3	4	5	6	7	8	Final
(Saskatchewan) Stefanie Lawton	0	0	1	0	0	0	X	X	1
(Manitoba) Chelsea Carey 🔨	0	2	0	3	0	1	X	X	6

Sheet F	1	2	3	4	5	6	7	8	Final
(Alberta) Heather Nedohin 🔨	0	1	0	1	1	0	2	0	5
(Switzerland) Michèle Jäggi	1	0	1	0	0	4	0	1	7

==== Draw 7 ====
Friday, November 16, 15:30

Sheet A	1	2	3	4	5	6	7	8	Final
(Manitoba) Cathy Overton-Clapham 🔨	1	0	0	2	1	2	X	X	6
(Alberta) Laura Crocker	0	3	0	0	0	0	X	X	3

Sheet B	1	2	3	4	5	6	7	8	Final
(Ontario) Rachel Homan 🔨	0	2	0	3	0	2	X	X	7
(Alberta) Shannon Kleibrink	0	0	1	0	1	0	X	X	2

Sheet C	1	2	3	4	5	6	7	8	Final
(Ontario) Sherry Middaugh 🔨	0	2	0	3	0	0	3	X	8
(Scotland) Eve Muirhead	0	0	1	0	1	2	0	X	4

Sheet D	1	2	3	4	5	6	7	8	Final
(Switzerland) Silvana Tirinzoni	0	2	0	3	0	0	2	X	7
(Manitoba) Kaitlyn Lawes 🔨	1	0	1	0	1	1	0	X	4

Sheet E	1	2	3	4	5	6	7	8	Final
(Alberta) Valerie Sweeting 🔨	0	1	0	3	1	1	0	X	6
(United States) Erika Brown	0	0	1	0	0	0	2	X	3

==== Draw 8 ====
Friday, November 16, 19:00

Sheet A	1	2	3	4	5	6	7	8	Final
(Manitoba) Chelsea Carey 🔨	0	3	4	0	0	1	X	X	8
(British Columbia) Kelly Scott	0	0	0	1	1	0	X	X	2

Sheet B	1	2	3	4	5	6	7	8	Final
(Alberta) Heather Nedohin 🔨	0	2	0	1	3	0	2	X	8
(Saskatchewan) Stefanie Lawton	0	0	1	0	0	1	0	X	2

Sheet D	1	2	3	4	5	6	7	8	9	Final
(Switzerland) Mirjam Ott 🔨	1	3	0	0	1	0	1	0	1	7
(Alberta) Crystal Webster	0	0	2	1	0	1	0	2	0	6

Sheet E	1	2	3	4	5	6	7	8	Final
(Russia) Anna Sidorova	0	1	0	2	0	1	0	0	4
(Switzerland) Michèle Jäggi 🔨	1	0	1	0	1	0	2	1	6

=== Tiebreakers ===
Saturday, November 17, 8:30

Team	1	2	3	4	5	6	7	8	Final
(Russia) Anna Sidorova	0	0	0	0	0	0	X	X	0
(Ontario) Sherry Middaugh 🔨	0	1	0	1	2	1	X	X	5

Team	1	2	3	4	5	6	7	8	Final
(Scotland) Eve Muirhead 🔨	1	0	0	2	0	2	1	1	7
(Manitoba) Kaitlyn Lawes	0	2	2	0	1	0	0	0	5

== Tier II ==
=== Teams ===
The teams are listed as follows:

Skip	Third	Second	Lead	Locale
Mary-Anne Arsenault	Colleen Jones	Kim Kelly	Jennifer Baxter	Halifax, Nova Scotia
Cathy Auld	Janet Murphy	Stephanie Gray	Melissa Foster	Mississauga, Ontario
Suzanne Birt	Shelly Bradley	Sarah Fullerton	Leslie MacDougall	Charlottetown, Prince Edward Island
Jacqueline Harrison	Kimberly Tuck	Susan Froud	Heather Nicol	Waterdown, Ontario
Julie Hastings	Christy Trombley	Stacey Smith	Katrina Collins	Thornhill, Ontario
Amber Holland	Jolene Campbell	Brooklyn Lemon	Dailene Sivertson	Regina, Saskatchewan
Tracy Horgan	Jenn Seabrook	Jenna Enge	Amanda Gates	Sudbury, Ontario
Jessie Kaufman	Nicky Kaufman	Kelly Erickson	Stephanie Enright	Edmonton, Alberta
Marie-France Larouche	Brenda Nicholls	Véronique Grégoire	Amélie Blais	Lévis, Quebec
Krista McCarville	Ashley Miharija	Kari Lavoie	Sarah Lang	Thunder Bay, Ontario
Allison Nimik	Katie Pringle	Lynn Kreviazuk	Morgan Court	Toronto, Ontario
Allison Pottinger	Nicole Joraanstad	Natalie Nicholson	Tabitha Peterson	(United States) St. Paul, St. Paul, Minnesota
Manuela Siegrist	Alina Pätz	Nadine Lehmann	Nicole Dünki	Basel, Switzerland
Heather Smith-Dacey	Stephanie McVicar	Blisse Comstock	Teri Lake	Halifax, Nova Scotia
Heather Strong	Laura Strong	Erica Trickett	Stephanie Korab	St. John's, Newfoundland and Labrador
Jill Thurston	Kristen Phillips	Brette Richards	Kendra Georges	Winnipeg, Manitoba

=== Knockout Draw Brackets ===
The draw is listed as follows:

==== A event ====
First Knockout		Semifinals		Qualifier 1
(Ontario) Cathy Auld	6
(Ontario) Jacqueline Harrison	5	(Ontario) Cathy Auld	6
(United States) Allison Pottinger	6	(Nova Scotia) Heather Smith-Dacey	5
(Nova Scotia) Heather Smith-Dacey	7			(Ontario) Cathy Auld	5
(Alberta) Jessie Kaufman	6			(Switzerland) Manuela Siegrist	3
(Switzerland) Manuela Siegrist	7	(Switzerland) Manuela Siegrist	6
(Ontario) Allison Nimik	5	(Ontario) Allison Nimik	4
(Ontario) Krista McCarville	4

First Knockout		Semifinals		Qualifier 2
(Saskatchewan) Amber Holland	5
(Newfoundland and Labrador) Heather Strong	9	(Newfoundland and Labrador) Heather Strong	3
(Quebec) Marie-France Larouche	9	(Quebec) Marie-France Larouche	6
(Ontario) Jill Thurston	4			(Quebec) Marie-France Larouche	5
(Prince Edward Island) Suzanne Birt	5			(Ontario) Tracy Horgan	8
(Ontario) Julie Hastings	8	(Ontario) Julie Hastings	5
(Ontario) Tracy Horgan	7	(Ontario) Tracy Horgan	7
(Nova Scotia) Mary-Anne Arsenault	5

==== B event ====
Second Knockout		Semifinals		Qualifier 3
(Ontario) Jacqueline Harrison	10
(United States) Allison Pottinger	0	(Ontario) Jacqueline Harrison	8
(Alberta) Jessie Kaufman	6	(Alberta) Jessie Kaufman	3
(Ontario) Krista McCarville	2			(Ontario) Jacqueline Harrison	7
				(Quebec) Marie-France Larouche	3

Second Knockout		Semifinals		Qualifier 4
(Saskatchewan) Amber Holland	2
(Ontario) Jill Thurston	8	(Ontario) Jill Thurston	4
(Prince Edward Island) Suzanne Birt	7	(Prince Edward Island) Suzanne Birt	5
(Nova Scotia) Mary-Anne Arsenault	2			(Prince Edward Island) Suzanne Birt	8
				(Switzerland) Manuela Siegrist	1

Second Knockout		Qualifier 5
(Nova Scotia) Heather Smith-Dacey	3
(Ontario) Allison Nimik	4	(Ontario) Allison Nimik	1
(Newfoundland and Labrador) Heather Strong	7	(Newfoundland and Labrador) Heather Strong	6
(Ontario) Julie Hastings	1

==== C event ====
Third Knockout		Semifinals		Qualifier 6
(United States) Allison Pottinger	2
(Ontario) Krista McCarville	4	(Ontario) Krista McCarville	7
		(Ontario) Julie Hastings	5
				(Ontario) Krista McCarville	5
				(Switzerland) Manuela Siegrist	3

Third Knockout		Semifinals		Qualifier 7
(Saskatchewan) Amber Holland	5
(Nova Scotia) Mary-Anne Arsenault	6	(Nova Scotia) Mary-Anne Arsenault	6
		(Nova Scotia) Heather Smith-Dacey	4
				(Nova Scotia) Mary-Anne Arsenault	2
				(Quebec) Marie-France Larouche	5

Third Knockout		Qualifier 8
(Alberta) Jessie Kaufman	5
(Ontario) Jill Thurston	6	(Ontario) Jill Thurston	4
		(Ontario) Allison Nimik	6

=== Knockout results ===
All draw times are listed in Eastern Standard Time.

==== Draw 1 ====
Thursday, November 14, 8:30

Sheet 1	1	2	3	4	5	6	7	8	Final
(Ontario) Cathy Auld 🔨	3	0	1	0	0	1	0	1	6
(Ontario) Jacqueline Harrison	0	2	0	1	0	0	2	0	5

Sheet 2	1	2	3	4	5	6	7	8	Final
(United States) Allison Pottinger	3	1	0	1	0	0	1	0	6
(Nova Scotia) Heather Smith-Dacey 🔨	0	0	2	0	2	1	0	2	7

Sheet 3	1	2	3	4	5	6	7	8	9	Final
(Alberta) Jessie Kaufman	0	0	0	0	0	1	0	1	0	2
(Switzerland) Manuela Siegrist 🔨	1	0	0	0	0	0	1	0	1	3

Sheet 4	1	2	3	4	5	6	7	8	Final
(Ontario) Allison Nimik	0	0	1	0	2	0	1	1	5
(Ontario) Krista McCarville 🔨	1	0	0	1	0	2	0	0	4

==== Draw 2 ====
Thursday, November 14, 11:30

Sheet 1	1	2	3	4	5	6	7	8	Final
(Saskatchewan) Amber Holland	0	1	0	0	2	2	0	0	5
(Newfoundland and Labrador) Heather Strong 🔨	2	0	1	0	0	3	1	2	9

Sheet 2	1	2	3	4	5	6	7	8	Final
(Quebec) Marie-France Larouche 🔨	2	0	1	0	3	0	3	X	9
(Ontario) Jill Thurston	0	1	0	1	0	2	0	X	4

Sheet 3	1	2	3	4	5	6	7	8	Final
(Prince Edward Island) Suzanne Birt	0	2	0	0	2	1	0	0	5
(Ontario) Julie Hastings 🔨	2	0	1	1	0	0	3	1	8

Sheet 4	1	2	3	4	5	6	7	8	Final
(Ontario) Tracy Horgan 🔨	0	2	0	3	0	1	0	1	7
(Nova Scotia) Mary-Anne Arsenault	0	0	2	0	1	0	2	0	5

==== Draw 3 ====
Thursday, November 14, 14:30

Sheet 1	1	2	3	4	5	6	7	8	Final
(Ontario) Cathy Auld	0	1	0	2	0	2	0	1	6
(Nova Scotia) Heather Smith-Dacey 🔨	1	0	1	0	2	0	1	0	5

Sheet 2	1	2	3	4	5	6	7	8	Final
(Switzerland) Manuela Siegrist 🔨	0	2	2	0	0	0	2	X	6
(Ontario) Allison Nimik	0	0	0	1	1	2	0	X	4

Sheet 3	1	2	3	4	5	6	7	8	Final
(Ontario) Jacqueline Harrison 🔨	1	3	3	3	X	X	X	X	10
(United States) Allison Pottinger	0	0	0	0	X	X	X	X	0

Sheet 4	1	2	3	4	5	6	7	8	Final
(Alberta) Jessie Kaufman 🔨	0	2	0	1	0	2	1	X	6
(Ontario) Krista McCarville	0	0	0	0	2	0	0	X	2

==== Draw 4 ====
Thursday, November 14, 17:30

Sheet 1	1	2	3	4	5	6	7	8	Final
(Newfoundland and Labrador) Heather Strong 🔨	1	0	0	1	0	1	0	X	3
(Quebec) Marie-France Larouche	0	1	1	0	2	0	2	X	6

Sheet 2	1	2	3	4	5	6	7	8	Final
(Ontario) Julie Hastings 🔨	1	0	0	2	2	0	0	0	5
(Ontario) Tracy Horgan	0	0	1	0	0	2	2	2	7

Sheet 3	1	2	3	4	5	6	7	8	Final
(Saskatchewan) Amber Holland	1	0	1	0	0	X	X	X	2
(Ontario) Jill Thurston	0	4	0	1	3	X	X	X	8

Sheet 4	1	2	3	4	5	6	7	8	Final
(Prince Edward Island) Suzanne Birt 🔨	1	0	2	0	2	2	X	X	7
(Nova Scotia) Mary-Anne Arsenault	0	1	0	1	0	0	X	X	2

==== Draw 5 ====
Thursday, November 14, 20:30

Sheet 1	1	2	3	4	5	6	7	8	Final
(Ontario) Cathy Auld	0	1	0	0	2	1	1	X	5
(Switzerland) Manuela Siegrist 🔨	2	0	1	0	0	0	0	X	3

Sheet 2	1	2	3	4	5	6	7	8	Final
(Ontario) Jacqueline Harrison 🔨	0	5	0	2	0	0	1	X	8
(Alberta) Jessie Kaufman	0	0	1	0	1	1	0	X	3

Sheet 3	1	2	3	4	5	6	7	8	Final
(Nova Scotia) Heather Smith-Dacey	0	0	0	1	0	0	2	X	3
(Ontario) Allison Nimik 🔨	0	1	1	0	0	2	0	X	4

==== Draw 6 ====
Friday, November 15, 8:30

Sheet 1	1	2	3	4	5	6	7	8	Final
(Quebec) Marie-France Larouche 🔨	1	0	1	0	2	0	1	X	5
(Ontario) Tracy Horgan	0	2	0	5	0	1	0	X	8

Sheet 2	1	2	3	4	5	6	7	8	Final
(Ontario) Jill Thurston	0	1	0	2	0	0	1	X	4
(Prince Edward Island) Suzanne Birt 🔨	1	0	1	0	2	1	0	X	5

Sheet 3	1	2	3	4	5	6	7	8	Final
(Newfoundland and Labrador) Heather Strong 🔨	1	1	2	0	2	1	X	X	7
(Ontario) Julie Hastings	0	0	0	1	0	0	X	X	1

Sheet 4	1	2	3	4	5	6	7	8	Final
(United States) Allison Pottinger 🔨	0	0	1	0	0	1	0	0	2
(Ontario) Krista McCarville	0	0	0	2	0	0	1	1	4

==== Draw 7 ====
Friday, November 15, 12:30

Sheet 1	1	2	3	4	5	6	7	8	Final
(Ontario) Jacqueline Harrison 🔨	2	2	0	0	2	0	1	X	7
(Quebec) Marie-France Larouche	0	0	1	1	0	1	0	X	3

Sheet 2	1	2	3	4	5	6	7	8	Final
(Prince Edward Island) Suzanne Birt 🔨	3	2	0	3	X	X	X	X	8
(Switzerland) Manuela Siegrist	0	0	1	0	X	X	X	X	1

Sheet 3	1	2	3	4	5	6	7	8	Final
(Ontario) Allison Nimik	0	0	1	0	X	X	X	X	1
(Newfoundland and Labrador) Heather Strong 🔨	2	2	0	2	X	X	X	X	6

Sheet 4	1	2	3	4	5	6	7	8	Final
(Saskatchewan) Amber Holland	0	1	1	1	0	0	2	0	5
(Nova Scotia) Mary-Anne Arsenault 🔨	2	0	0	0	1	2	0	1	6

==== Draw 8 ====
Friday, November 15, 16:30

Sheet 1	1	2	3	4	5	6	7	8	Final
(Ontario) Krista McCarville 🔨	2	0	0	1	0	2	0	2	7
(Ontario) Julie Hastings	0	2	0	0	1	0	2	0	5

Sheet 2	1	2	3	4	5	6	7	8	Final
(Nova Scotia) Mary-Anne Arsenault	0	2	0	1	0	2	1	X	6
(Nova Scotia) Heather Smith-Dacey 🔨	1	0	2	0	1	0	0	X	4

Sheet 3	1	2	3	4	5	6	7	8	Final
(Alberta) Jessie Kaufman 🔨	1	0	0	3	0	1	0	0	5
(Ontario) Jill Thurston	0	1	1	0	1	0	2	1	6

==== Draw 9 ====
Friday, November 15, 20:30

Sheet 2	1	2	3	4	5	6	7	8	Final
(Ontario) Jill Thurston	0	0	0	0	1	0	3	0	4
(Ontario) Allison Nimik 🔨	0	0	2	1	0	2	0	1	6

Sheet 3	1	2	3	4	5	6	7	8	Final
(Nova Scotia) Mary-Anne Arsenault	0	0	1	0	0	0	1	X	2
(Quebec) Marie-France Larouche 🔨	1	3	0	0	1	0	0	X	5

Sheet 4	1	2	3	4	5	6	7	8	Final
(Ontario) Krista McCarville	0	1	0	2	1	1	0	X	5
(Switzerland) Manuela Siegrist 🔨	1	0	1	0	0	0	1	X	3

=== Playoffs qualifiers ===
Semifinals		To Playoffs
(Ontario) Cathy Auld	5
(Ontario) Allison Nimik	7	(Ontario) Allison Nimik	3
(Prince Edward Island) Suzanne Birt	4	(Newfoundland and Labrador) Heather Strong	7
(Newfoundland and Labrador) Heather Strong	6

Semifinals		To Playoffs
(Ontario) Tracy Horgan	7
(Quebec) Marie-France Larouche	6	(Ontario) Tracy Horgan	6
(Ontario) Jacqueline Harrison	2	(Ontario) Krista McCarville	5
(Ontario) Krista McCarville	4

==== Results ====
Saturday, November 16, 8:30

Sheet 2	1	2	3	4	5	6	7	8	Final
(Ontario) Cathy Auld 🔨	2	0	0	1	0	0	2	0	5
(Ontario) Allison Nimik	0	0	2	0	1	3	0	1	7

Sheet 3	1	2	3	4	5	6	7	8	Final
(Prince Edward Island) Suzanne Birt	0	2	0	0	1	0	0	1	4
(Newfoundland and Labrador) Heather Strong 🔨	1	0	0	1	0	2	2	0	6

Sheet 4	1	2	3	4	5	6	7	8	9	Final
(Ontario) Tracy Horgan 🔨	2	0	1	0	1	0	2	0	1	7
(Quebec) Marie-France Larouche	0	1	0	2	0	1	0	2	0	6

Sheet 5	1	2	3	4	5	6	7	8	Final
(Ontario) Jacqueline Harrison 🔨	0	0	0	1	1	0	0	0	2
(Ontario) Krista McCarville	0	0	0	0	0	3	0	1	4

Saturday, November 16, 12:00

Team	1	2	3	4	5	6	7	8	Final
(Ontario) Allison Nimik	0	0	2	0	0	1	0	X	3
(Newfoundland and Labrador) Heather Strong 🔨	1	3	0	1	1	0	1	X	7

Team	1	2	3	4	5	6	7	8	Final
(Ontario) Tracy Horgan 🔨	1	0	0	1	0	1	0	3	6
(Ontario) Krista McCarville	0	0	2	0	1	0	2	0	5

== Playoffs ==
Quarterfinals
(Ontario) Rachel Homan	6
(Ontario) Tracy Horgan	2
(Alberta) Shannon Kleibrink	2
(Scotland) Eve Muirhead	7
(Manitoba) Chelsea Carey	4
(Newfoundland and Labrador) Heather Strong	0
(Switzerland) Silvana Tirinzoni	6
(Ontario) Sherry Middaugh	5

Semifinals
(Ontario) Rachel Homan	5
(Scotland) Eve Muirhead	4
(Manitoba) Chelsea Carey	7
(Switzerland) Silvana Tirinzoni	3

Final
(Ontario) Rachel Homan	8
(Manitoba) Chelsea Carey	3

=== Quarterfinals ===
Saturday, November 17, 15:30

Team	1	2	3	4	5	6	7	8	Final
(Alberta) Shannon Kleibrink	0	1	0	0	1	0	X	X	2
(Scotland) Eve Muirhead 🔨	1	0	2	0	0	4	X	X	7

Player percentages
(Alberta) Shannon Kleibrink		(Scotland) Eve Muirhead	
Chelsey Matson	89%	Claire Hamilton	91%
Kalynn Park	74%	Vicki Adams	80%
Bronwen Webster	70%	Anna Sloan	90%
Shannon Kleibrink	87%	Eve Muirhead	95%
Total	80%	Total	89%

Team	1	2	3	4	5	6	7	8	Final
(Switzerland) Silvana Tirinzoni	1	2	0	0	1	0	2	0	6
(Ontario) Sherry Middaugh	0	0	1	1	0	2	0	1	5

Player percentages
(Switzerland) Silvana Tirinzoni		(Ontario) Sherry Middaugh	
Sandra Gantenbein	73%	Leigh Armstrong	85%
Esther Neuenschwander	87%	Lee Merklinger	86%
Marlene Albrecht	77%	Jo-Ann Rizzo	79%
Silvana Tirinzoni	79%	Sherry Middaugh	86%
Total	79%	Total	84%

Saturday, November 17, 19:30

Team	1	2	3	4	5	6	7	8	Final
(Ontario) Rachel Homan	1	0	1	0	2	1	1	X	6
(Ontario) Tracy Horgan 🔨	0	1	0	1	0	0	0	X	2

Player percentages
(Ontario) Rachel Homan		(Ontario) Tracy Horgan	
Lisa Weagle	88%	Amanda Gates	84%
Alison Kreviazuk	79%	Jenna Enge	84%
Emma Miskew	96%	Jenn Seabrook	88%
Rachel Homan	97%	Tracy Horgan	78%
Total	90%	Total	83%

Team	1	2	3	4	5	6	7	8	Final
(Manitoba) Chelsea Carey 🔨	0	1	0	1	0	0	1	1	4
(Newfoundland and Labrador) Heather Strong	0	0	0	0	0	0	0	0	0

Player percentages
(Manitoba) Chelsea Carey		(Newfoundland and Labrador) Heather Strong	
Lindsay Titheridge	85%	Stephanie Korab	81%
Kristen Foster	83%	Erica Trickett	76%
Kristy McDonald	79%	Laura Strong	78%
Chelsea Carey	90%	Heather Strong	64%
Total	84%	Total	75%

=== Semifinals ===
Sunday, November 18, 8:00

Team	1	2	3	4	5	6	7	8	Final
(Ontario) Rachel Homan	0	0	0	1	0	1	0	3	5
(Scotland) Eve Muirhead	0	0	0	0	3	0	1	0	4

Player percentages
(Ontario) Rachel Homan		(Scotland) Eve Muirhead	
Lisa Weagle	97%	Claire Hamilton	88%
Alison Kreviazuk	90%	Vicki Adams	98%
Emma Miskew	89%	Anna Sloan	95%
Rachel Homan	77%	Eve Muirhead	77%
Total	88%	Total	90%

Team	1	2	3	4	5	6	7	8	Final
(Manitoba) Chelsea Carey	0	0	1	2	2	2	0	X	7
(Switzerland) Silvana Tirinzoni	1	1	0	0	0	0	1	X	3

Player percentages
(Manitoba) Chelsea Carey		(Switzerland) Silvana Tirinzoni	
Lindsay Titheridge	84%	Sandra Gantenbein	75%
Kristen Foster	78%	Esther Neuenschwander	82%
Kristy McDonald	76%	Marlene Albrecht	81%
Chelsea Carey	72%	Silvana Tirinzoni	59%
Total	77%	Total	74%

=== Final ===
Sunday, November 18, 13:00

Team	1	2	3	4	5	6	7	8	Final
(Ontario) Rachel Homan 🔨	0	1	2	0	2	0	3	X	8
(Manitoba) Chelsea Carey	0	0	0	2	0	1	0	X	3

Player percentages
(Ontario) Rachel Homan		(Manitoba) Chelsea Carey	
Lisa Weagle	88%	Lindsay Titheridge	79%
Alison Kreviazuk	84%	Kristen Foster	59%
Emma Miskew	73%	Kristy McDonald	76%
Rachel Homan	79%	Chelsea Carey	76%
Total	81%	Total	72%
