= 2021 Prince Edward Island Scotties Tournament of Hearts =

2021 PEI Scotties Tournament of Hearts Women's Championship
- Host city: O'Leary, Prince Edward Island
- Arena: Maple Leaf Curling Club
- Dates: January 29–30
- Winner: Team Birt
- Curling club: Montague CC, Montague
- Skip: Suzanne Birt
- Third: Kathy O'Rourke
- Second: Meaghan Hughes
- Lead: Michelle McQuaid
- Alternate: Marie Christianson
- Coach: Mitchell O'Shea
- Finalist: Darlene London

The 2021 PEI Scotties Tournament of Hearts Women's Championship, the women's provincial curling championship for Prince Edward Island, was held from January 29 to 30 at the Maple Leaf Curling Club in O'Leary, Prince Edward Island. The winning Suzanne Birt rink represented Prince Edward Island at the 2021 Scotties Tournament of Hearts in Calgary, Alberta, and finished with a 4–4, just missing the championship round. The event was held in conjunction with the 2021 PEI Tankard, the provincial men's championship.

Due to the COVID-19 pandemic in Canada, many teams could not commit to the quarantine process in order to compete at the national championship. Clubmates Suzanne Birt and Darlene London were the only two teams to enter the event. Team Birt won the best of five series in just three games.

== Teams ==
The teams are listed as follows:

Skip	Third	Second	Lead	Alternate	Club
Suzanne Birt	Kathy O'Rourke (Note: Marie Christianson, who usually throws third stones for Team Birt, was unable to compete at the event due to travel restrictions. The team's alternate, Kathy O'Rourke, threw third stones.)	Meaghan Hughes	Michelle McQuaid	Marie Christianson	Montague Curling Club, Montague
Darlene London	Robyn MacDonald	Shelly Rice	Gail Greene		Montague Curling Club, Montague

== Results ==
All draw times are listed in Atlantic Time (UTC−04:00).

=== Standings ===
Final Standings

Skip	W	L	PF	PA	EW	EL	BE	SE
Suzanne Birt	3	0	34	3	14	3	0	9
Darlene London	0	3	3	34	3	14	2	0

=== Draw 1 ===
Friday, January 29, 4:00 pm

Sheet 3	1	2	3	4	5	6	7	8	9	10	Final
Suzanne Birt	1	1	0	5	3	2	X	X	X	X	12
Darlene London	0	0	0	0	0	0	X	X	X	X	0

=== Draw 2 ===
Saturday, January 30, 11:00 am

Sheet 4	1	2	3	4	5	6	7	8	9	10	Final
Darlene London	0	0	0	1	0	1	0	X	X	X	2
Suzanne Birt	2	2	2	0	3	0	3	X	X	X	12

=== Draw 3 ===
Saturday, January 30, 4:00 pm

Sheet 3	1	2	3	4	5	6	7	8	9	10	Final
Suzanne Birt	1	4	0	3	0	2	X	X	X	X	10
Darlene London	0	0	0	0	1	0	X	X	X	X	1

2021 PEI Scotties Tournament of Hearts
(Prince Edward Island)
Suzanne Birt
12th PEI Provincial Championship title
