= 2015 Prince Edward Island Scotties Tournament of Hearts =

- Host city: Summerside, Prince Edward Island
- Arena: Silver Fox Curling & Yacht Club
- Dates: January 23–26
- Winner: Suzanne Birt
- Curling club: Charlottetown Curling Complex, Charlottetown
- Skip: Suzanne Birt
- Third: Shelly Bradley
- Second: Michelle McQuaid
- Lead: Susan McInnis
- Finalist: Kathy O'Rourke

The 2015 Prince Edward Island Scotties Tournament of Hearts, the provincial women's curling championship of Prince Edward Island, were held from January 23 to 26 at the Silver Fox Curling & Yacht Club in Summerside, Prince Edward Island. The winning team was the Suzanne Birt rink from Charlottetown who represented Prince Edward Island at the 2015 Scotties Tournament of Hearts in Moose Jaw, Saskatchewan.

== Teams ==
Skip	Third	Second	Lead	Alternate	Club(s)
Suzanne Birt	Shelly Bradley	Michelle McQuaid	Susan McInnis		Charlottetown Curling Complex, Charlottetown
Kim Dolan	Sinead Dolan	Jackie Reid	Michala Robison		Charlottetown Curling Complex, Charlottetown
Lisa Jackson	Carolyn Coulson	Melissa Morrow	Jodi Murphy		Cornwall Curling Club, Cornwall
Robyn Green (fourth)	Meaghan Hughes	Kathy O'Rourke (skip)	Tricia Affleck	Stefanie Clark	Charlottetown Curling Complex, Charlottetown

== Knockout Draw Brackets ==
=== A event ===
First Knockout		Qualifier 1
Kathy O'Rourke	6
Lisa Jackson	2	Kathy O'Rourke	11
Suzanne Birt	9	Suzanne Birt	9
Kim Dolan	5

=== B event ===
Second Knockout		Semifinals		Finals
				Kathy O'Rourke	4
Lisa Jackson	8			Suzanne Birt	8
Kim Dolan	9	Kim Dolan	7
		Suzanne Birt	8

=== C event ===
Third Knockout		Semifinals		Finals
				Suzanne Birt	7
Kim Dolan	8			Kim Dolan	6
Lisa Jackson	7	Kim Dolan	9
		Kathy O'Rourke	6

== Knockout results ==
=== Draw 1 ===
Friday, January 23, 2:00 pm

Sheet 2	1	2	3	4	5	6	7	8	9	10	Final
Kathy O'Rourke	0	1	0	1	0	2	0	2	0	X	6
Lisa Jackson 🔨	0	0	0	0	0	0	1	0	1	X	2

Sheet 3	1	2	3	4	5	6	7	8	9	10	Final
Suzanne Birt	0	4	1	0	2	0	1	1	0	X	9
Kim Dolan 🔨	1	0	0	1	0	2	0	0	1	X	5

=== Draw 2 ===
Friday, January 23, 7:00 pm

Sheet 4	1	2	3	4	5	6	7	8	9	10	Final
Kathy O'Rourke	0	3	2	0	0	1	0	2	0	3	11
Suzanne Birt	1	0	0	2	3	0	1	0	2	0	9

Sheet 5	1	2	3	4	5	6	7	8	9	10	Final
Lisa Jackson 🔨	2	0	2	0	1	0	0	1	0	2	8
Kim Dolan	0	2	0	3	0	2	1	0	1	0	9

=== Draw 3 ===
Saturday, January 24, 10:00 am

Sheet 2	1	2	3	4	5	6	7	8	9	10	11	Final
Kim Dolan 🔨	1	0	2	0	2	0	0	2	0	0	0	7
Suzanne Birt	0	1	0	2	0	1	0	0	2	1	1	8

=== Draw 4 ===
Saturday, January 24, 3:00 pm

Sheet 3	1	2	3	4	5	6	7	8	9	10	Final
Kathy O'Rourke 🔨	0	2	0	1	1	0	0	0	0	X	4
Suzanne Birt	2	0	1	0	0	1	1	1	2	X	8

Sheet 4	1	2	3	4	5	6	7	8	9	10	Final
Kim Dolan 🔨	1	0	4	0	1	0	1	0	1	0	8
Lisa Jackson	0	1	0	3	0	0	0	2	0	1	7

=== Draw 5 ===
Sunday, January 25, 10:00 am

Team	1	2	3	4	5	6	7	8	9	10	Final
Kim Dolan	0	0	2	0	0	3	1	0	3		9
Kathy O'Rourke	1	0	0	1	3	0	0	1	0		6

=== Draw 6 ===
Sunday, January 25, 3:00 pm

Team	1	2	3	4	5	6	7	8	9	10	Final
Suzanne Birt	1	0	0	1	1	0	0	1	1	2	7
Kim Dolan	0	0	4	0	0	1	1	0	0	0	6

== Playoffs ==
Birt must be beaten twice.

Semifinal			Final
			A	Suzanne Birt
B	Suzanne Birt	10	B	Suzanne Birt
C	Kathy O'Rourke	4

=== Semifinal ===
Monday, January 26, 1:00 pm

Team	1	2	3	4	5	6	7	8	9	10	Final
Kathy O'Rourke	0	2	0	1	0	0	1	0	X	X	4
Suzanne Birt 🔨	2	0	3	0	3	1	0	1	X	X	10

=== Final ===
Monday, January 26, 6:00 pm

Unnecessary

2015 Prince Edward Island Scotties Tournament of Hearts

Suzanne Birt
8th Prince Edward Island Provincial Championship title
