= 2001 Canadian Junior Curling Championships =

The 2001 Kärcher Canadian Junior Curling Championships were held February 3–11 at the St. Catharines Golf & Country Club in St. Catharines, Ontario. The winning teams represented Canada at the 2001 World Junior Curling Championships.

== Men's ==
=== Teams ===
Province / Territory	Skip	Third	Second	Lead
Alberta	Jeff Erickson	Marc Kennedy	Kevin Skarban	Aaron Sarafinchan
British Columbia	Andrew Bilesky	Daniel McCaughan	Irwin Lee	Corey Baxter
Manitoba	Mike McEwen	Denni Neufeld	Geordie Hargreaves	Nolan Thiessen
New Brunswick	Jamie Murphy	Blake Kelly	Brian King	Luke Johnson
Newfoundland	Brad Gushue	Mark Nichols	Brent Hamilton	Mike Adam
Northern Ontario	Brian Adams	Ben Mikkelsen	Colin Koivula	Justin McCarville
Northwest Territories	Sheldon Wettig	Tyler Janz	Jared Cowan	Matthew Green
Nova Scotia	Denis Belliveau	Jonathan MacDonald	Jason Van Vonderen	Nicholas Deagle
Ontario	Bobby Reid	Brad Russell	Phil Sager	Mark Stanfield
Prince Edward Island	Mark Waugh	Tyler MacKenzie	Daniel Richard	Jeremy Cameron
Quebec	Eric Halle	Leo-Pierre D'Amours	Carol Gagnon	Remi Halle
Saskatchewan	William Coutts	Nathan Grudnizki	Stuart Coutts	Ryan Faller
Yukon	Wes Klippert	Kyle Gee	Dustin Mikkelsen	Alex Cameron

=== Standings ===
Locale	Skip	W	L
Newfoundland	Brad Gushue	9	3
Northern Ontario	Brian Adams	9	3
Manitoba	Mike McEwen	9	3
Nova Scotia	Denis Belliveau	8	4
Saskatchewan	William Coutts	8	4
Alberta	Jeff Erickson	7	5
Ontario	Bobby Reid	6	6
British Columbia	Andrew Bilesky	5	7
Prince Edward Island	Mark Waugh	5	7
New Brunswick	Jamie Murphy	4	8
Quebec	Eric Halle	4	8
Northwest Territories	Sheldon Wettig	3	9
Yukon	Wes Klippert	1	11

=== Results ===
==== Draw 1 ====
Sheet A	1	2	3	4	5	6	7	8	9	10	Final
Alberta (Erickson) 🔨	0	1	1	0	0	0	3	0	3	X	8
New Brunswick (Murphy)	1	0	0	0	0	0	0	1	0	X	2

Sheet E	1	2	3	4	5	6	7	8	9	10	Final
Newfoundland (Gushue) 🔨	0	0	2	0	0	2	1	3	1	X	9
Prince Edward Island (Waugh)	0	1	0	1	1	0	0	0	0	X	3

Sheet G	1	2	3	4	5	6	7	8	9	10	Final
Ontario (Reid) 🔨	0	0	1	0	1	0	0	0	0	0	2
Saskatchewan (Coutts)	1	0	0	1	0	0	1	0	3	0	6

Sheet I	1	2	3	4	5	6	7	8	9	10	11	12	Final
Nova Scotia (Belliveau) 🔨	0	0	1	0	0	1	0	1	0	1	0	2	6
British Columbia (Bilesky)	0	0	0	1	1	0	1	0	1	0	0	0	4

==== Draw 2 ====
Sheet A	1	2	3	4	5	6	7	8	9	10	Final
Yukon (Klippert) 🔨	0	0	1	0	2	1	0	0	2	X	6
Quebec (Halle)	1	0	0	3	0	0	2	3	0	X	9

Sheet C	1	2	3	4	5	6	7	8	9	10	Final
Manitoba (McEwen) 🔨	0	1	0	1	0	2	1	1	0	1	7
Alberta (Erickson)	0	0	1	0	1	0	0	0	2	0	4

Sheet E	1	2	3	4	5	6	7	8	9	10	Final
Northern Ontario (Adams) 🔨	0	2	1	0	2	0	1	0	3	X	9
Nova Scotia (Belliveau)	0	0	0	2	0	1	0	1	0	X	4

Sheet I	1	2	3	4	5	6	7	8	9	10	Final
Northwest Territories (Wettig) 🔨	0	2	0	0	1	0	2	1	0	X	6
Ontario (Reid)	4	0	1	2	0	3	0	0	0	X	10

==== Draw 3 ====
Sheet B	1	2	3	4	5	6	7	8	9	10	Final
British Columbia (Bilesky) 🔨	0	1	1	3	1	0	3	X	X	X	9
Newfoundland (Gushue)	3	0	0	0	0	1	0	X	X	X	4

Sheet D	1	2	3	4	5	6	7	8	9	10	Final
New Brunswick (Murphy) 🔨	1	0	1	0	3	2	0	0	3	X	10
Northwest Territories (Wettig)	0	2	0	1	0	0	2	1	0	X	6

Sheet F	1	2	3	4	5	6	7	8	9	10	Final
Quebec (Halle) 🔨	1	0	0	0	0	1	0	0	X	X	2
Manitoba (McEwen)	0	2	1	2	3	0	3	2	X	X	13

Sheet H	1	2	3	4	5	6	7	8	9	10	Final
Prince Edward Island (Waugh) 🔨	4	0	2	2	2	5	X	X	X	X	15
Yukon (Klippert)	0	0	0	0	0	0	X	X	X	X	0

Sheet J	1	2	3	4	5	6	7	8	9	10	Final
Saskatchewan (Coutts) 🔨	0	0	2	0	0	0	0	2	0	1	5
Northern Ontario (Adams)	0	0	0	2	0	0	1	0	1	0	4

==== Draw 4 ====
Sheet A	1	2	3	4	5	6	7	8	9	10	11	Final
Nova Scotia (Belliveau) 🔨	2	0	0	1	0	0	1	1	0	1	0	6
Newfoundland (Gushue)	0	1	2	0	1	1	0	0	1	0	1	7

Sheet C	1	2	3	4	5	6	7	8	9	10	11	Final
Prince Edward Island (Waugh) 🔨	0	2	1	0	0	0	1	0	2	0	0	6
Quebec (Halle)	1	0	0	1	1	1	0	1	0	1	1	7

Sheet E	1	2	3	4	5	6	7	8	9	10	Final
New Brunswick (Murphy) 🔨	0	0	3	0	1	1	0	2	1	X	8
Ontario (Reid)	1	1	0	1	0	0	1	0	0	X	4

Sheet H	1	2	3	4	5	6	7	8	9	10	11	Final
Northwest Territories (Wettig) 🔨	2	0	0	1	0	2	0	0	2	0	2	9
Saskatchewan (Coutts)	0	2	1	0	2	0	0	0	0	2	0	7

Sheet J	1	2	3	4	5	6	7	8	9	10	Final
Yukon (Klippert) 🔨	0	0	1	0	0	3	0	0	2	X	6
Manitoba (McEwen)	2	2	0	1	2	0	0	2	0	X	9

==== Draw 5 ====
Sheet D	1	2	3	4	5	6	7	8	9	10	Final
Northern Ontario (Adams) 🔨	1	2	0	0	2	0	3	X	X	X	8
British Columbia (Bilesky)	0	0	0	2	0	1	0	X	X	X	3

Sheet G	1	2	3	4	5	6	7	8	9	10	Final
Saskatchewan (Coutts) 🔨	1	0	0	0	0	2	0	1	0	X	4
Nova Scotia (Belliveau)	0	1	2	3	1	0	1	0	1	X	9

Sheet I	1	2	3	4	5	6	7	8	9	10	Final
Quebec (Halle) 🔨	0	1	0	1	0	1	0	0	1	0	4
Alberta (Erickson)	0	0	0	0	1	0	0	1	0	1	3

==== Draw 6 ====
Sheet B	1	2	3	4	5	6	7	8	9	10	Final
Alberta (Erickson) 🔨	0	0	0	0	1	0	0	0	X	X	1
Northwest Territories (Wettig)	0	1	1	1	0	1	1	1	X	X	6

Sheet C	1	2	3	4	5	6	7	8	9	10	Final
Newfoundland (Gushue) 🔨	2	2	0	3	2	1	X	X	X	X	10
Yukon (Klippert)	0	0	2	0	0	0	X	X	X	X	2

Sheet F	1	2	3	4	5	6	7	8	9	10	Final
British Columbia (Bilesky) 🔨	0	0	3	2	0	0	3	X	X	X	8
Prince Edward Island (Waugh)	0	0	0	0	0	1	0	X	X	X	1

Sheet H	1	2	3	4	5	6	7	8	9	10	11	Final
Manitoba (McEwen) 🔨	2	0	0	0	0	3	0	0	1	0	1	7
New Brunswick (Murphy)	0	0	1	0	2	0	1	1	0	1	0	6

Sheet I	1	2	3	4	5	6	7	8	9	10	Final
Ontario (Reid) 🔨	1	0	3	0	1	0	0	1	0	X	6
Northern Ontario (Adams)	0	2	0	1	0	1	3	0	1	X	8

==== Draw 7 ====
Sheet B	1	2	3	4	5	6	7	8	9	10	Final
Ontario (Reid) 🔨	0	2	0	0	2	0	1	0	2	0	7
Nova Scotia (Belliveau)	0	0	1	1	0	3	0	2	0	2	9

Sheet D	1	2	3	4	5	6	7	8	9	10	Final
Yukon (Klippert) 🔨	1	0	0	0	0	1	0	3	1	X	6
Alberta (Erickson)	0	1	2	1	2	0	3	0	0	X	9

Sheet E	1	2	3	4	5	6	7	8	9	10	Final
Manitoba (McEwen) 🔨	1	0	0	1	0	0	1	1	0	X	4
Northwest Territories (Wettig)	0	0	0	0	1	0	0	0	1	X	2

Sheet G	1	2	3	4	5	6	7	8	9	10	Final
Northern Ontario (Adams) 🔨	1	0	0	4	0	1	0	1	0	0	7
Newfoundland (Gushue)	0	1	1	0	2	0	3	0	2	1	10

==== Draw 8 ====
Sheet C	1	2	3	4	5	6	7	8	9	10	Final
New Brunswick (Murphy) 🔨	0	0	2	0	2	1	0	0	2	1	8
Saskatchewan (Coutts)	2	0	0	1	0	0	3	3	0	0	9

Sheet E	1	2	3	4	5	6	7	8	9	10	Final
British Columbia (Bilesky) 🔨	0	0	3	1	1	1	0	2	1	X	9
Yukon (Klippert)	1	1	0	0	0	0	2	0	0	X	4

Sheet H	1	2	3	4	5	6	7	8	9	10	Final
Nova Scotia (Belliveau) 🔨	0	0	2	0	1	0	0	1	1	0	5
Prince Edward Island (Waugh)	0	0	0	1	0	3	1	0	0	1	6

Sheet J	1	2	3	4	5	6	7	8	9	10	Final
Newfoundland (Gushue) 🔨	0	0	3	0	2	0	2	1	0	X	8
Quebec (Halle)	0	1	0	1	0	1	0	0	1	X	4

==== Draw 9 ====
Sheet A	1	2	3	4	5	6	7	8	9	10	Final
Prince Edward Island (Waugh) 🔨	0	0	0	0	0	1	0	X	X	X	1
Manitoba (McEwen)	0	2	1	2	1	0	2	X	X	X	8

Sheet C	1	2	3	4	5	6	7	8	9	10	Final
Northwest Territories (Wettig) 🔨	0	0	2	0	3	0	1	0	0	0	6
Northern Ontario (Adams)	2	0	0	2	0	2	0	0	0	1	7

Sheet F	1	2	3	4	5	6	7	8	9	10	Final
Alberta (Erickson) 🔨	0	2	0	1	0	0	0	0	2	0	5
Ontario (Reid)	0	0	1	0	1	1	1	1	0	1	6

Sheet G	1	2	3	4	5	6	7	8	9	10	Final
Quebec (Halle) 🔨	1	0	0	1	0	3	0	0	1	0	6
New Brunswick (Murphy)	0	1	1	0	1	0	1	1	0	4	9

Sheet I	1	2	3	4	5	6	7	8	9	10	Final
Saskatchewan (Coutts) 🔨	0	0	1	1	1	2	2	X	X	X	7
British Columbia (Bilesky)	0	0	0	0	0	0	0	X	X	X	0

==== Draw 10 ====
Sheet A	1	2	3	4	5	6	7	8	9	10	Final
Alberta (Erickson) 🔨	1	0	1	0	1	1	3	X	X	X	7
Saskatchewan (Coutts)	0	0	0	1	0	0	0	X	X	X	1

Sheet D	1	2	3	4	5	6	7	8	9	10	Final
Newfoundland (Gushue) 🔨	1	0	2	0	4	1	X	X	X	X	8
Manitoba (McEwen)	0	2	0	0	0	0	X	X	X	X	2

Sheet H	1	2	3	4	5	6	7	8	9	10	Final
British Columbia (Bilesky) 🔨	2	2	0	3	1	0	4	X	X	X	12
Quebec (Halle)	0	0	2	0	0	1	0	X	X	X	3

==== Draw 11 ====
Sheet A	1	2	3	4	5	6	7	8	9	10	Final
Quebec (Halle) 🔨	0	3	0	3	1	1	0	1	X	X	9
Northwest Territories (Wettig)	1	0	1	0	0	0	2	0	X	X	4

Sheet D	1	2	3	4	5	6	7	8	9	10	Final
New Brunswick (Murphy) 🔨	0	0	0	0	0	2	0	0	1	1	4
Northern Ontario (Adams)	0	0	1	1	1	0	2	0	0	0	5

Sheet F	1	2	3	4	5	6	7	8	9	10	Final
Nova Scotia (Belliveau) 🔨	2	3	2	2	0	4	X	X	X	X	13
Yukon (Klippert)	0	0	0	0	1	0	X	X	X	X	1

Sheet G	1	2	3	4	5	6	7	8	9	10	Final
Prince Edward Island (Waugh) 🔨	1	0	0	1	0	0	1	0	0	0	3
Alberta (Erickson)	0	0	1	0	1	2	0	0	0	1	5

Sheet J	1	2	3	4	5	6	7	8	9	10	Final
Manitoba (McEwen) 🔨	1	0	1	0	2	1	0	1	2	X	8
Ontario (Reid)	0	1	0	2	0	0	1	0	0	X	4

==== Draw 12 ====
Sheet B	1	2	3	4	5	6	7	8	9	10	Final
Northern Ontario (Adams) 🔨	0	2	0	1	1	1	1	1	X	X	7
Prince Edward Island (Waugh)	0	0	0	0	0	0	0	0	X	X	0

Sheet D	1	2	3	4	5	6	7	8	9	10	Final
Northwest Territories (Wettig) 🔨	0	1	1	0	0	1	0	0	X	X	3
Nova Scotia (Belliveau)	2	0	0	4	0	0	1	2	X	X	9

Sheet E	1	2	3	4	5	6	7	8	9	10	Final
Ontario (Reid) 🔨	1	0	0	2	1	0	0	1	0	1	6
British Columbia (Bilesky)	0	1	1	0	0	1	0	0	1	0	4

Sheet H	1	2	3	4	5	6	7	8	9	10	Final
Saskatchewan (Coutts) 🔨	1	0	2	0	0	0	0	0	1	1	5
Newfoundland (Gushue)	0	1	0	1	0	1	0	0	0	0	3

Sheet I	1	2	3	4	5	6	7	8	9	10	Final
Yukon (Klippert) 🔨	0	1	0	1	0	0	X	X	X	X	2
New Brunswick (Murphy)	2	0	4	0	4	4	X	X	X	X	14

==== Draw 13 ====
Sheet B	1	2	3	4	5	6	7	8	9	10	Final
Nova Scotia (Belliveau) 🔨	1	0	0	0	3	0	2	0	0	1	7
Quebec (Halle)	0	0	3	0	0	2	0	1	0	0	6

Sheet C	1	2	3	4	5	6	7	8	9	10	Final
British Columbia (Bilesky) 🔨	0	0	0	1	0	2	0	1	0	X	4
Manitoba (McEwen)	0	1	1	0	1	0	2	0	1	X	6

Sheet H	1	2	3	4	5	6	7	8	9	10	Final
Prince Edward Island (Waugh) 🔨	1	0	2	0	3	0	2	0	1	1	10
New Brunswick (Murphy)	0	2	0	3	0	2	0	2	0	0	9

Sheet J	1	2	3	4	5	6	7	8	9	10	Final
Northern Ontario (Adams) 🔨	3	2	0	4	1	0	X	X	X	X	10
Yukon (Klippert)	0	0	1	0	0	1	X	X	X	X	2

==== Draw 14 ====
Sheet A	1	2	3	4	5	6	7	8	9	10	Final
Ontario (Reid) 🔨	1	1	1	0	3	1	0	0	X	X	7
Newfoundland (Gushue)	0	0	0	1	0	0	2	1	X	X	4

Sheet E	1	2	3	4	5	6	7	8	9	10	Final
Alberta (Erickson) 🔨	1	0	1	0	1	0	2	0	2	1	8
Northern Ontario (Adams)	0	2	0	1	0	1	0	1	0	0	5

Sheet G	1	2	3	4	5	6	7	8	9	10	Final
Northwest Territories (Wettig) 🔨	0	1	2	0	0	0	2	0	2	0	7
British Columbia (Bilesky)	1	0	0	1	1	1	0	1	0	0	5

Sheet J	1	2	3	4	5	6	7	8	9	10	Final
Saskatchewan (Coutts) 🔨	1	2	3	0	2	0	X	X	X	X	8
Prince Edward Island (Waugh)	0	0	0	1	0	1	X	X	X	X	2

==== Draw 15 ====
Sheet B	1	2	3	4	5	6	7	8	9	10	Final
Yukon (Klippert) 🔨	1	0	2	1	1	0	3	X	X	X	8
Northwest Territories (Wettig)	0	0	0	0	0	1	0	X	X	X	1

Sheet D	1	2	3	4	5	6	7	8	9	10	Final
Quebec (Halle) 🔨	0	2	1	0	0	1	1	0	3	0	8
Ontario (Reid)	0	0	0	4	3	0	0	1	0	1	9

Sheet F	1	2	3	4	5	6	7	8	9	10	Final
Manitoba (McEwen) 🔨	2	0	2	1	1	0	2	X	X	X	8
Saskatchewan (Coutts)	0	0	0	0	0	1	0	X	X	X	1

Sheet G	1	2	3	4	5	6	7	8	9	10	11	Final
Newfoundland (Gushue) 🔨	3	0	0	1	0	1	0	1	1	0	2	9
Alberta (Erickson)	0	0	1	0	2	0	3	0	0	1	0	7

Sheet J	1	2	3	4	5	6	7	8	9	10	Final
New Brunswick (Murphy) 🔨	0	0	1	0	1	0	1	0	X	X	3
Nova Scotia (Belliveau)	2	2	0	2	0	1	0	3	X	X	10

==== Draw 16 ====
Sheet D	1	2	3	4	5	6	7	8	9	10	Final
Saskatchewan (Coutts) 🔨	3	0	0	2	0	4	0	2	X	X	11
Yukon (Klippert)	0	2	0	0	1	0	1	0	X	X	4

Sheet F	1	2	3	4	5	6	7	8	9	10	Final
Prince Edward Island (Waugh) 🔨	0	0	2	0	2	0	3	2	X	X	9
Northwest Territories (Wettig)	1	2	0	0	0	1	0	0	X	X	4

Sheet H	1	2	3	4	5	6	7	8	9	10	Final
Northern Ontario (Adams) 🔨	1	0	0	1	1	3	1	3	0	X	10
Quebec (Halle)	0	3	1	0	0	0	0	0	1	X	5

Sheet J	1	2	3	4	5	6	7	8	9	10	Final
British Columbia (Bilesky) 🔨	1	0	0	1	0	0	0	1	0	X	3
Alberta (Erickson)	0	2	0	0	1	0	1	0	1	X	5

==== Draw 17 ====
Sheet A	1	2	3	4	5	6	7	8	9	10	Final
Manitoba (McEwen) 🔨	2	0	0	0	0	0	1	X	X	X	3
Northern Ontario (Adams)	0	0	2	2	1	2	0	X	X	X	7

Sheet C	1	2	3	4	5	6	7	8	9	10	11	Final
Alberta (Erickson) 🔨	0	0	2	0	1	0	2	0	2	0	1	8
Nova Scotia (Belliveau)	0	0	0	2	0	3	0	1	0	1	0	7

Sheet F	1	2	3	4	5	6	7	8	9	10	Final
Newfoundland (Gushue) 🔨	3	0	2	1	1	0	0	1	X	X	8
New Brunswick (Murphy)	0	2	0	0	0	1	0	0	X	X	3

Sheet G	1	2	3	4	5	6	7	8	9	10	Final
Yukon (Klippert) 🔨	1	0	1	0	1	0	1	0	X	X	4
Ontario (Reid)	0	2	0	3	0	2	0	2	X	X	9

==== Draw 18 ====
Sheet A	1	2	3	4	5	6	7	8	9	10	Final
New Brunswick (Murphy) 🔨	0	0	0	0	4	0	2	0	0	X	6
British Columbia (Bilesky)	1	1	1	2	0	2	0	3	1	X	11

Sheet C	1	2	3	4	5	6	7	8	9	10	11	Final
Ontario (Reid) 🔨	0	0	2	1	1	1	0	0	0	1	0	6
Prince Edward Island (Waugh)	1	1	0	0	0	0	1	2	1	0	1	7

Sheet E	1	2	3	4	5	6	7	8	9	10	Final
Quebec (Halle) 🔨	1	0	0	0	0	0	1	X	X	X	2
Saskatchewan (Coutts)	0	3	0	1	1	3	0	X	X	X	8

Sheet G	1	2	3	4	5	6	7	8	9	10	Final
Nova Scotia (Belliveau) 🔨	1	0	1	0	0	0	2	0	2	X	6
Manitoba (McEwen)	0	1	0	1	1	0	0	1	0	X	4

Sheet I	1	2	3	4	5	6	7	8	9	10	Final
Northwest Territories (Wettig) 🔨	0	0	1	0	0	1	0	X	X	X	2
Newfoundland (Gushue)	0	2	0	4	1	0	2	X	X	X	9

=== Playoffs ===
Semifinal		Final
Manitoba	8
Northern Ontario	3	Manitoba	3
		Newfoundland	8

==== Semifinal ====
Sheet I	1	2	3	4	5	6	7	8	9	10	Final
Manitoba (McEwen)	1	0	2	1	0	4	0	X	X	X	8
Northern Ontario (Adams) 🔨	0	1	0	0	1	0	1	X	X	X	3

Player percentages
Manitoba		Northern Ontario	
Nolan Thiessen	88%	Justin McCarville	88%
Geordie Hargreaves	73%	Colin Koivula	75%
Denni Neufeld	84%	Ben Mikkelsen	54%
Mike McEwen	95%	Brian Adams	64%
Total	85%	Total	70%

==== Final ====
Sheet B	1	2	3	4	5	6	7	8	9	10	Final
Manitoba (McEwen)	0	1	0	0	0	1	0	1	0	X	3
Newfoundland (Gushue) 🔨	2	0	0	2	0	0	3	0	1	X	8

Player percentages
Manitoba		Newfoundland	
Nolan Thiessen	94%	Mike Adam	81%
Geordie Hargreaves	85%	Brent Hamilton	100%
Denni Neufeld	79%	Mark Nichols	95%
Mike McEwen	71%	Brad Gushue	94%
Total	82%	Total	93%

== Women's ==
=== Teams ===
Province / Territory	Skip	Third	Second	Lead
Alberta	Leslie Rogers	Pamela Henderson	Jenilee Goertzen	Jamie Bass
British Columbia	Allison Shivas	Diana Shivas	Steph Jackson	Heather Shivas
Manitoba	Allison Nimik	Kristin Loder	Lindsay Titheridge	Elisabeth Peters
New Brunswick	Sylvie Robichaud	Carol Webb	Erin McCormack	Marie Richard
Newfoundland	Jennifer Guzzwell	Shelley Nichols	Stephanie LeDrew	Noelle Thomas
Northern Ontario	Krista Scharf	Angie Del Pino	Laura Armitage	Maggie Carr
Northwest Territories	Brie-Anne Jefferson	Danielle Ellis	Tristan Koswan	Jenna Alexander
Nova Scotia	Jill Mouzar	Meaghan Smart	Meghan MacAdams	Carolyn Marshall
Ontario	Carrie Lindner	Megan Balsdon	Lindsay Osborne	Trisha Bourgeois
Prince Edward Island	Suzanne Gaudet	Stefanie Richard	Robyn MacPhee	Kelly Higgins
Quebec	Veronique Gregoire	Audree Dufresne	Caroline Normand	Julie Cantin
Saskatchewan	Stefanie Miller	Marliese Miller	Chantelle Seiferling	Chelsey Bell
Yukon	Nicole Baldwin	Lindsay Moffatt	Hailey Birnie	Naomi Hales

=== Standings ===
Locale	Skip	W	L
Saskatchewan	Stefanie Miller	12	0
Prince Edward Island	Suzanne Gaudet	10	2
Ontario	Carrie Lindner	8	4
New Brunswick	Sylvie Robichaud	7	5
Northern Ontario	Krista Scharf	7	5
Quebec	Veronique Gregoire	7	5
Alberta	Leslie Rogers	6	6
British Columbia	Allison Shivas	5	7
Yukon	Nicole Baldwin	5	7
Manitoba	Allison Nimik	4	8
Newfoundland	Jennifer Guzzwell	4	8
Northwest Territories	Brie-Anne Jefferson	2	10
Nova Scotia	Jill Mouzar	1	11

=== Results ===
==== Draw 1 ====
Sheet B	1	2	3	4	5	6	7	8	9	10	Final
Alberta (Rogers) 🔨	0	1	0	1	0	0	2	0	2	0	6
New Brunswick (Robichaud)	0	0	2	0	0	2	0	1	0	2	7

Sheet F	1	2	3	4	5	6	7	8	9	10	Final
Newfoundland (Guzzwell) 🔨	1	0	1	0	2	0	0	1	0	0	5
Prince Edward Island (Gaudet)	0	1	0	4	0	0	2	0	2	0	9

Sheet H	1	2	3	4	5	6	7	8	9	10	Final
Ontario (Lindner) 🔨	0	0	1	0	0	0	1	0	1	X	3
Saskatchewan (Miller)	1	1	0	0	2	0	0	3	0	X	7

Sheet J	1	2	3	4	5	6	7	8	9	10	Final
Nova Scotia (Mouzar) 🔨	1	0	2	0	0	1	0	2	1	0	7
British Columbia (Shivas)	0	1	0	2	1	0	2	0	0	3	9

==== Draw 2 ====
Sheet B	1	2	3	4	5	6	7	8	9	10	Final
Yukon (Baldwin) 🔨	1	0	2	0	0	2	0	0	1	0	6
Quebec (Gregoire)	0	1	0	3	1	0	1	1	0	1	8

Sheet D	1	2	3	4	5	6	7	8	9	10	Final
Manitoba (Nimik) 🔨	1	0	0	0	0	1	0	2	0	X	4
Alberta (Rogers)	0	0	0	3	1	0	2	0	1	X	7

Sheet F	1	2	3	4	5	6	7	8	9	10	Final
Northern Ontario (Scharf) 🔨	0	0	1	0	1	1	0	2	0	1	6
Nova Scotia (Mouzar)	0	0	0	1	0	0	1	0	2	0	4

Sheet J	1	2	3	4	5	6	7	8	9	10	Final
Northwest Territories (Jefferson) 🔨	0	0	0	0	1	0	3	0	1	0	5
Ontario (Lindner)	1	3	3	1	0	2	0	2	0	0	12

==== Draw 3 ====
Sheet A	1	2	3	4	5	6	7	8	9	10	Final
British Columbia (Shivas) 🔨	0	0	1	2	0	0	0	0	X	X	3
Newfoundland (Guzzwell)	0	1	0	0	2	4	1	2	X	X	10

Sheet C	1	2	3	4	5	6	7	8	9	10	Final
New Brunswick (Robichaud) 🔨	2	0	2	1	0	0	2	0	3	X	10
Northwest Territories (Jefferson)	0	1	0	0	1	1	0	1	0	X	4

Sheet E	1	2	3	4	5	6	7	8	9	10	Final
Quebec (Gregoire) 🔨	2	0	0	1	0	1	0	0	1	X	5
Manitoba (Nimik)	0	2	2	0	1	0	1	2	0	X	8

Sheet G	1	2	3	4	5	6	7	8	9	10	Final
Prince Edward Island (Gaudet) 🔨	0	0	3	0	3	1	1	0	X	X	8
Yukon (Baldwin)	0	0	0	2	0	0	0	1	X	X	3

Sheet I	1	2	3	4	5	6	7	8	9	10	Final
Saskatchewan (Miller) 🔨	0	1	1	0	0	1	0	0	1	0	4
Northern Ontario (Scharf)	0	0	0	0	1	0	0	0	0	0	1

==== Draw 4 ====
Sheet B	1	2	3	4	5	6	7	8	9	10	Final
Nova Scotia (Mouzar) 🔨	2	0	0	1	0	1	0	1	0	3	8
Newfoundland (Guzzwell)	0	0	1	0	2	0	1	0	1	0	5

Sheet D	1	2	3	4	5	6	7	8	9	10	Final
Prince Edward Island (Gaudet) 🔨	0	0	0	0	1	0	0	X	X	X	1
Quebec (Gregoire)	0	1	1	1	0	4	2	X	X	X	9

Sheet F	1	2	3	4	5	6	7	8	9	10	Final
New Brunswick (Robichaud) 🔨	0	3	0	4	0	3	X	X	X	X	10
Ontario (Lindner)	0	0	2	0	1	0	X	X	X	X	3

Sheet G	1	2	3	4	5	6	7	8	9	10	Final
Northwest Territories (Jefferson) 🔨	1	0	0	1	0	1	1	0	0	X	4
Saskatchewan (Miller)	0	2	1	0	1	0	0	2	1	X	7

Sheet I	1	2	3	4	5	6	7	8	9	10	Final
Yukon (Baldwin) 🔨	2	0	1	0	2	0	0	0	2	X	7
Manitoba (Nimik)	0	1	0	1	0	1	1	0	0	X	4

==== Draw 5 ====
Sheet C	1	2	3	4	5	6	7	8	9	10	Final
Northern Ontario (Scharf) 🔨	1	1	0	0	2	0	1	0	3	X	8
British Columbia (Shivas)	0	0	2	0	0	1	0	1	0	X	4

Sheet H	1	2	3	4	5	6	7	8	9	10	Final
Saskatchewan (Miller) 🔨	2	0	0	0	0	0	1	0	0	3	6
Nova Scotia (Mouzar)	0	1	1	0	1	0	0	1	1	0	5

Sheet J	1	2	3	4	5	6	7	8	9	10	Final
Quebec (Gregoire) 🔨	0	0	0	1	0	1	1	0	0	X	3
Alberta (Rogers)	0	0	2	0	2	0	0	0	3	X	7

==== Draw 6 ====
Sheet A	1	2	3	4	5	6	7	8	9	10	Final
Alberta (Rogers) 🔨	2	0	3	1	0	3	2	0	X	X	11
Northwest Territories (Jefferson)	0	1	0	0	1	0	0	1	X	X	3

Sheet D	1	2	3	4	5	6	7	8	9	10	11	Final
Newfoundland (Guzzwell) 🔨	0	1	0	0	1	0	1	0	2	1	0	6
Yukon (Baldwin)	0	0	1	1	0	2	0	2	0	0	1	7

Sheet E	1	2	3	4	5	6	7	8	9	10	Final
British Columbia (Shivas) 🔨	1	0	1	0	0	1	0	0	0	X	3
Prince Edward Island (Gaudet)	0	1	0	2	2	0	0	1	3	X	9

Sheet G	1	2	3	4	5	6	7	8	9	10	Final
Manitoba (Nimik) 🔨	2	0	0	0	1	0	0	1	1	0	5
New Brunswick (Robichaud)	0	0	2	1	0	1	2	0	0	1	7

Sheet J	1	2	3	4	5	6	7	8	9	10	Final
Ontario (Lindner) 🔨	0	0	0	2	0	2	0	1	0	2	7
Northern Ontario (Scharf)	1	0	1	0	2	0	1	0	0	0	5

==== Draw 7 ====
Sheet A	1	2	3	4	5	6	7	8	9	10	11	Final
Ontario (Lindner) 🔨	0	0	1	0	3	1	1	0	0	0	1	7
Nova Scotia (Mouzar)	0	0	0	1	0	0	0	4	0	1	0	6

Sheet C	1	2	3	4	5	6	7	8	9	10	Final
Yukon (Baldwin) 🔨	1	0	4	1	1	1	X	X	X	X	8
Alberta (Rogers)	0	2	0	0	0	0	X	X	X	X	2

Sheet F	1	2	3	4	5	6	7	8	9	10	Final
Manitoba (Nimik) 🔨	2	0	0	0	2	0	0	1	1	1	7
Northwest Territories (Jefferson)	0	2	1	1	0	1	1	0	0	0	6

Sheet H	1	2	3	4	5	6	7	8	9	10	Final
Northern Ontario (Scharf) 🔨	2	1	2	2	0	2	2	X	X	X	11
Newfoundland (Guzzwell)	0	0	0	0	3	0	0	X	X	X	3

==== Draw 8 ====
Sheet D	1	2	3	4	5	6	7	8	9	10	Final
New Brunswick (Robichaud) 🔨	0	2	0	2	0	1	0	2	0	0	7
Saskatchewan (Miller)	0	0	2	0	2	0	2	0	1	1	8

Sheet F	1	2	3	4	5	6	7	8	9	10	Final
British Columbia (Shivas) 🔨	1	0	0	2	0	2	0	2	1	0	8
Yukon (Baldwin)	0	0	1	0	1	0	2	0	0	3	7

Sheet G	1	2	3	4	5	6	7	8	9	10	11	Final
Nova Scotia (Mouzar) 🔨	0	1	0	2	2	0	1	0	0	2	0	8
Prince Edward Island (Gaudet)	1	0	1	0	0	3	0	1	2	0	2	10

Sheet I	1	2	3	4	5	6	7	8	9	10	Final
Newfoundland (Guzzwell) 🔨	0	1	0	1	0	2	1	1	0	2	8
Quebec (Gregoire)	1	0	2	0	2	0	0	0	1	0	6

==== Draw 9 ====
Sheet B	1	2	3	4	5	6	7	8	9	10	Final
Prince Edward Island (Gaudet) 🔨	1	0	0	2	0	0	1	1	0	1	6
Manitoba (Nimik)	0	1	0	0	1	2	0	0	1	0	5

Sheet D	1	2	3	4	5	6	7	8	9	10	Final
Northwest Territories (Jefferson) 🔨	2	0	1	0	1	0	2	0	X	X	6
Northern Ontario (Scharf)	0	3	0	3	0	3	0	3	X	X	12

Sheet E	1	2	3	4	5	6	7	8	9	10	Final
Alberta (Rogers) 🔨	0	0	0	0	0	1	0	0	2	0	3
Ontario (Lindner)	0	0	0	1	2	0	1	1	0	0	5

Sheet H	1	2	3	4	5	6	7	8	9	10	Final
Quebec (Gregoire) 🔨	2	1	0	0	2	4	X	X	X	X	9
New Brunswick (Robichaud)	0	0	1	1	0	0	X	X	X	X	2

Sheet J	1	2	3	4	5	6	7	8	9	10	Final
Saskatchewan (Miller) 🔨	0	1	4	0	6	X	X	X	X	X	11
British Columbia (Shivas)	0	0	0	1	0	X	X	X	X	X	1

==== Draw 10 ====
Sheet B	1	2	3	4	5	6	7	8	9	10	Final
Alberta (Rogers) 🔨	1	0	2	0	0	0	1	0	1	0	5
Saskatchewan (Miller)	0	2	0	0	2	1	0	1	0	1	7

Sheet C	1	2	3	4	5	6	7	8	9	10	Final
Newfoundland (Guzzwell) 🔨	2	0	0	2	0	3	0	0	1	X	8
Manitoba (Nimik)	0	2	3	0	2	0	0	2	0	X	9

Sheet G	1	2	3	4	5	6	7	8	9	10	Final
British Columbia (Shivas) 🔨	0	0	3	0	2	0	1	0	0	X	6
Quebec (Gregoire)	2	1	0	2	0	1	0	1	1	X	8

==== Draw 11 ====
Sheet B	1	2	3	4	5	6	7	8	9	10	Final
Quebec (Gregoire) 🔨	0	2	2	2	0	4	X	X	X	X	10
Northwest Territories (Jefferson)	1	0	0	0	1	0	X	X	X	X	2

Sheet C	1	2	3	4	5	6	7	8	9	10	Final
New Brunswick (Robichaud) 🔨	1	0	0	0	0	1	0	0	2	0	4
Northern Ontario (Scharf)	0	1	0	0	3	0	1	1	0	1	7

Sheet E	1	2	3	4	5	6	7	8	9	10	Final
Nova Scotia (Mouzar) 🔨	2	1	0	0	1	1	0	0	1	0	6
Yukon (Baldwin)	0	0	2	0	0	0	3	2	0	2	9

Sheet H	1	2	3	4	5	6	7	8	9	10	Final
Prince Edward Island (Gaudet) 🔨	3	0	0	2	0	0	2	3	X	X	10
Alberta (Rogers)	0	0	2	0	1	1	0	0	X	X	4

Sheet I	1	2	3	4	5	6	7	8	9	10	11	Final
Manitoba (Nimik) 🔨	1	0	0	1	0	1	0	1	0	2	0	6
Ontario (Lindner)	0	0	3	0	1	0	0	0	2	0	1	7

==== Draw 12 ====
Sheet A	1	2	3	4	5	6	7	8	9	10	Final
Northern Ontario (Scharf) 🔨	1	0	2	0	1	0	0	1	X	X	5
Prince Edward Island (Gaudet)	0	2	0	1	0	3	3	0	X	X	9

Sheet C	1	2	3	4	5	6	7	8	9	10	Final
Northwest Territories (Jefferson) 🔨	1	0	1	0	0	2	0	0	2	X	6
Nova Scotia (Mouzar)	0	1	0	1	0	0	0	1	0	X	3

Sheet F	1	2	3	4	5	6	7	8	9	10	Final
Ontario (Lindner) 🔨	1	2	0	0	0	2	0	1	0	X	6
British Columbia (Shivas)	0	0	1	0	1	0	0	0	1	X	3

Sheet G	1	2	3	4	5	6	7	8	9	10	Final
Saskatchewan (Miller) 🔨	3	2	0	4	0	0	2	X	X	X	11
Newfoundland (Guzzwell)	0	0	1	0	2	1	0	X	X	X	4

Sheet J	1	2	3	4	5	6	7	8	9	10	Final
Yukon (Baldwin) 🔨	0	0	0	1	0	1	1	0	0	X	3
New Brunswick (Robichaud)	0	1	2	0	1	0	0	2	1	X	7

==== Draw 13 ====
Sheet A	1	2	3	4	5	6	7	8	9	10	Final
Nova Scotia (Mouzar) 🔨	2	0	0	1	0	0	0	2	1	0	6
Quebec (Gregoire)	0	1	0	0	2	1	1	0	0	2	7

Sheet D	1	2	3	4	5	6	7	8	9	10	Final
British Columbia (Shivas) 🔨	2	1	1	0	0	0	2	1	0	2	9
Manitoba (Nimik)	0	0	0	1	2	1	0	0	4	0	8

Sheet G	1	2	3	4	5	6	7	8	9	10	Final
Prince Edward Island (Gaudet) 🔨	0	0	0	2	1	0	3	0	1	X	7
New Brunswick (Robichaud)	0	0	2	0	0	1	0	1	0	X	4

Sheet I	1	2	3	4	5	6	7	8	9	10	Final
Northern Ontario (Scharf) 🔨	0	1	0	2	1	0	1	5	0	X	10
Yukon (Baldwin)	1	0	1	0	0	2	0	0	1	X	5

==== Draw 14 ====
Sheet B	1	2	3	4	5	6	7	8	9	10	Final
Ontario (Lindner) 🔨	0	1	0	0	2	0	1	0	2	0	6
Newfoundland (Guzzwell)	0	0	0	2	0	2	0	2	0	1	7

Sheet F	1	2	3	4	5	6	7	8	9	10	Final
Alberta (Rogers) 🔨	2	0	0	2	1	1	0	1	0	1	8
Northern Ontario (Scharf)	0	2	1	0	0	0	2	0	2	0	7

Sheet H	1	2	3	4	5	6	7	8	9	10	Final
Northwest Territories (Jefferson) 🔨	1	1	3	1	0	0	0	2	0	0	8
British Columbia (Shivas)	0	0	0	0	3	1	3	0	1	1	9

Sheet I	1	2	3	4	5	6	7	8	9	10	Final
Saskatchewan (Miller) 🔨	4	0	0	0	0	1	1	2	0	X	8
Prince Edward Island (Gaudet)	0	0	1	1	1	0	0	0	1	X	4

==== Draw 15 ====
Sheet A	1	2	3	4	5	6	7	8	9	10	Final
Yukon (Baldwin) 🔨	1	1	1	2	1	2	1	X	X	X	9
Northwest Territories (Jefferson)	0	0	0	0	0	0	0	X	X	X	0

Sheet C	1	2	3	4	5	6	7	8	9	10	Final
Quebec (Gregoire) 🔨	0	1	0	0	0	3	1	0	0	0	5
Ontario (Lindner)	1	0	2	1	1	0	0	1	2	1	9

Sheet E	1	2	3	4	5	6	7	8	9	10	Final
Manitoba (Nimik) 🔨	0	1	0	1	0	0	1	0	0	X	3
Saskatchewan (Miller)	1	0	1	0	0	2	0	2	1	X	7

Sheet H	1	2	3	4	5	6	7	8	9	10	Final
Newfoundland (Guzzwell) 🔨	1	0	2	0	1	0	2	0	4	X	10
Alberta (Rogers)	0	1	0	1	0	0	0	2	0	X	4

Sheet I	1	2	3	4	5	6	7	8	9	10	Final
New Brunswick (Robichaud) 🔨	1	0	0	1	3	0	0	0	0	2	7
Nova Scotia (Mouzar)	0	1	0	0	0	2	2	0	0	0	5

==== Draw 16 ====
Sheet C	1	2	3	4	5	6	7	8	9	10	Final
Saskatchewan (Miller) 🔨	1	4	0	1	0	1	0	1	0	X	8
Yukon (Baldwin)	0	0	1	0	1	0	1	0	1	X	4

Sheet E	1	2	3	4	5	6	7	8	9	10	11	Final
Prince Edward Island (Gaudet) 🔨	2	0	0	0	0	1	0	2	0	2	1	8
Northwest Territories (Jefferson)	0	1	1	1	1	0	1	0	2	0	0	7

Sheet G	1	2	3	4	5	6	7	8	9	10	Final
Northern Ontario (Scharf) 🔨	1	0	1	0	1	1	0	0	2	0	6
Quebec (Gregoire)	0	1	0	1	0	0	3	1	0	1	7

Sheet I	1	2	3	4	5	6	7	8	9	10	Final
British Columbia (Shivas) 🔨	0	1	0	0	1	0	3	0	1	X	6
Alberta (Rogers)	1	0	3	0	0	3	0	1	0	X	8

==== Draw 17 ====
Sheet B	1	2	3	4	5	6	7	8	9	10	Final
Manitoba (Nimik) 🔨	1	0	1	0	0	0	1	0	0	X	3
Northern Ontario (Scharf)	0	1	0	1	0	1	0	0	3	X	6

Sheet D	1	2	3	4	5	6	7	8	9	10	Final
Alberta (Rogers) 🔨	1	0	1	0	0	1	1	0	0	1	5
Nova Scotia (Mouzar)	0	1	0	0	0	0	0	1	0	0	2

Sheet E	1	2	3	4	5	6	7	8	9	10	Final
Newfoundland (Guzzwell) 🔨	0	0	0	0	0	0	X	X	X	X	0
New Brunswick (Robichaud)	0	2	1	0	2	2	X	X	X	X	7

Sheet H	1	2	3	4	5	6	7	8	9	10	11	Final
Yukon (Baldwin) 🔨	0	2	0	1	0	1	0	0	0	1	0	5
Ontario (Lindner)	0	0	1	0	1	0	1	1	1	0	1	6

==== Draw 18 ====
Sheet B	1	2	3	4	5	6	7	8	9	10	Final
New Brunswick (Robichaud) 🔨	1	0	0	0	1	0	1	0	2	0	5
British Columbia (Shivas)	0	0	0	2	0	1	0	2	0	1	6

Sheet D	1	2	3	4	5	6	7	8	9	10	11	Final
Ontario (Lindner) 🔨	0	2	0	0	3	0	0	0	0	1	0	6
Prince Edward Island (Gaudet)	0	0	1	1	0	3	0	0	1	0	1	7

Sheet F	1	2	3	4	5	6	7	8	9	10	Final
Quebec (Gregoire) 🔨	2	0	2	0	1	0	1	0	0	X	6
Saskatchewan (Miller)	0	3	0	1	0	3	0	1	3	X	11

Sheet H	1	2	3	4	5	6	7	8	9	10	Final
Nova Scotia (Mouzar) 🔨	0	1	0	1	0	0	1	0	0	X	3
Manitoba (Nimik)	0	0	2	0	1	1	0	2	1	X	7

Sheet J	1	2	3	4	5	6	7	8	9	10	Final
Northwest Territories (Jefferson) 🔨	0	3	1	0	3	0	4	X	X	X	11
Newfoundland (Guzzwell)	1	0	0	1	0	2	0	X	X	X	4

=== Playoffs ===
Semifinal		Final
Prince Edward Island	5
Ontario	2	Prince Edward Island	5
		Saskatchewan	3

==== Semifinal ====
Sheet G	1	2	3	4	5	6	7	8	9	10	Final
Prince Edward Island (Gaudet) 🔨	1	0	0	0	1	0	1	0	2	X	5
Ontario (Lindner)	0	1	0	0	0	0	0	1	0	X	2

Player percentages
Prince Edward Island		Ontario	
Kelly Higgins	83%	Trisha Bourgeois	84%
Robyn MacPhee	86%	Lindsay Osborne	80%
Stefanie Richard	84%	Megan Balsdon	76%
Suzanne Gaudet	88%	Carrie Lindner	75%
Total	85%	Total	79%

==== Final ====
Sheet B	1	2	3	4	5	6	7	8	9	10	Final
Prince Edward Island (Gaudet)	0	0	2	0	1	0	1	0	0	1	5
Saskatchewan (Miller) 🔨	0	1	0	0	0	1	0	0	1	0	3

Player percentages
Prince Edward Island		Saskatchewan	
Kelly Higgins	87%	Chelsey Bell	66%
Robyn MacPhee	84%	Chantelle Seiferling	79%
Stefanie Richard	75%	Marliese Miller	65%
Suzanne Gaudet	79%	Stefanie Miller	75%
Total	81%	Total	71%

== Qualification ==
=== Ontario ===
The Teranet Ontario Junior Curling Championships were held at the Forest Curling Club in Forest. The finals were on January 7.

Carrie Lindner of Bradford defeated Julie Reddick of Oakville 7-6 in the women's final. Lindner defeated Lee Merklinger of the Granite Club of Ottawa West in the semifinal, 7-1.

In the men's final, Bobby Reid of the High Park Club defeated Chris Ciasnocha of the Ottawa Curling Club 5-3. Ciasnocha had defeated Tyler Morgan of Burlington 10-8 in the semifinal.
