= Suzanne Birt =

Canadian curler (born 1981)

- Curler
- Born: Suzanne Gaudet; October 2, 1981 (age 45); Summerside, Prince Edward Island, Canada

Team
- Curling club: Montague CC, Montague, PEI
- Skip: Suzanne Birt
- Third: Michelle Shea
- Second: Meaghan Hughes
- Lead: Sinead Dolan

Curling career
- Member Association: Prince Edward Island
- Hearts: 14 (2003, 2004, 2006, 2007, 2008, 2011, 2013, 2015, 2016, 2019, 2020, 2021, 2022, 2023)
- Top CTRS ranking: 9th (2019–20)
Medal record
Women's curling
Representing Canada
World Junior Championships
Gold medal – first place	2001 Ogden
Bronze medal – third place	2002 Kelowna
Representing Prince Edward Island
Scotties Tournament of Hearts
Bronze medal – third place	2003 Kitchener
Canadian Junior Curling Championships
Gold medal – first place	2001 St. Catharines
Gold medal – first place	2002 Summerside
Silver medal – second place	2000 Moncton
Bronze medal – third place	1998 Calgary
Canada Games
Silver medal – second place	1995 Grande Prairie

Suzanne Birt (born Suzanne Gaudet on October 2, 1981, in Summerside, Prince Edward Island) is a Canadian curler from Charlottetown, Prince Edward Island. She currently skips her own team.

== Career ==
=== Juniors ===
Birt, a skip, is a two-time Canadian Junior Champion (2001, 2002) and a former World Junior Curling Champion (2001). She also won a silver medal at the 1995 Canada Games.

Birt had attended the 1998, 1999, and 2000 Canadian Junior Championships before finally winning it.

At the 2001 World Junior Championships, she defeated Matilda Mattsson's Swedish rink for the gold. The following year she would win the bronze.

=== 2003–2011 ===
In 2003, Birt qualified for the Scotties Tournament of Hearts for the first time. Her team had an impressive tournament, going 10–1 in the round-robin, only to lose both their playoff games. The next year, she fell short of expectations, and her team finished 2–9 at the 2004 Scott Tournament of Hearts. In 2005, she lost in her provincial playdowns, but returned to the Scotts in 2006. At the 2006 Scott Tournament of Hearts, Birt's rink finished 4–7, and at the 2007 tournament, they finished 6–5. They did make the playoffs, but lost to Manitoba, skipped by Jennifer Jones in the 3 vs. 4-page playoff game. Birt played in her fifth Hearts in 2008, finishing with a 3–8 record. Upon her return to the 2011 Scotties Tournament of Hearts, this time in her hometown of Charlottetown, Birt and her team were hoping to build on the momentum left by the defending PEI Champions, headed by Kathy O'Rourke, who made it to the final of the 2010 Scotties Tournament of Hearts. Unfortunately, Birt would have a tough time, finishing with a 6–5 record.

=== 2012–2016 ===
At the very first Curl Atlantic Championship, Birt and her team went undefeated in round-robin play. She advanced to the semifinal, where she defeated New Brunswick's Andrea Kelly. In the final Birt would meet with six time Scotties champion, and two time world champion Colleen Jones, where she would end up winning the championship, earning at trip to Switzerland to compete in the Bernese Ladies Cup. Birt and her team would have a very successful time at the event, qualifying for the playoffs. She would defeat Canada's Jan Betker in the quarterfinal, before losing to Canada's Jennifer Jones in the semifinal. Birt and team would play in the bronze medal game, where they defeated Switzerland's Silvana Tirinzoni, to place third overall in the competition.

With the departure of Birt's second Robyn MacPhee, PEI Junior Champion Sarah Fullerton, was added to the team for the 2012–2013 season. The team qualified for the 2013 Scotties Tournament of Hearts where they finished with a 5–6 record.

For the 2013–14 season, Birt brought in a new front end of Michelle McQuaid and Susan McInnes. On the tour, they won the 2013 Royal LePage Women's Fall Classic. In the 2014 Prince Edward Island Scotties Tournament of Hearts, the team had a very poor showing, finishing in last place with a 1–3 record. The team had much more success at the 2015 PEI Scotties, winning the event, and qualifying for the 2015 Scotties Tournament of Hearts. There, Birt led her team to a 4–7 round-robin record, missing the playoffs.

Birt formed a brand-new team for the 2015–16 season, which consisted of Robyn MacPhee, Meaghan Hughes and Marie Christianson. On the tour that season, the team won the 2015 Sobeys Classic. The team won the 2016 Prince Edward Island Scotties Tournament of Hearts, and represented the province at the 2016 Scotties Tournament of Hearts. There, Birt fared no better than the previous season, finishing with a 4–7 record.

=== 2018–present ===
Birt took two seasons off from curling (which included winning $500,000 on an Atlantic Lottery scratch ticket in 2017), to take a "mental break". She returned to the sport for the 2018–19 season with teammates Christianson, Hughes and McQuaid. In her first season back, she won the 2018 WFG Jim Sullivan Curling Classic on the tour, and won her tenth provincial championship at the 2019 Prince Edward Island Scotties Tournament of Hearts. Birt skipped team PEI at the 2019 Scotties Tournament of Hearts to a 6–5 finish, good enough for sixth place, but out of the playoffs. The following season, they won the 2019 Tim Hortons Spitfire Arms Cash Spiel on the tour, and they would defend their provincial title, winning the 2020 Prince Edward Island Scotties Tournament of Hearts in early January 2020. At the 2020 Scotties Tournament of Hearts, Birt led PEI to a 5–6 record, finishing in eighth place.

Team Birt began the 2020–21 season with two runner-up finishes at the 2020 The Curling Store Cashspiel and the 2020 Dave Jones Stanhope Simpson Insurance Mayflower Cashspiel. Due to the COVID-19 pandemic in Prince Edward Island, many teams had to opt out of the 2021 Prince Edward Island Scotties Tournament of Hearts as they could not commit to the quarantine process in order to compete in the 2021 Scotties Tournament of Hearts. This meant that only Birt's rink and her clubmate Darlene London's rink entered the event. In the best-of-five series, Team Birt defeated Team London three games to zero to earn the right to represent Prince Edward Island at the 2021 Scotties in Calgary, Alberta. At the Tournament of Hearts, Birt led her team to a 4–4 round-robin record, failing to qualify for the championship round.

The Birt rink had two appearances in the finals to begin the 2021–22 season. The team lost in the final of the 2021 Oakville Fall Classic to Team Jamie Sinclair and the final of the 2021 Oakville Labour Day Classic to Team Tracy Fleury. Due to the COVID-19 pandemic in Canada, the qualification process for the 2021 Canadian Olympic Curling Trials had to be modified to qualify enough teams for the championship. In these modifications, Curling Canada created the 2021 Canadian Curling Trials Direct-Entry Event, an event where five teams would compete to try to earn one of three spots into the 2021 Canadian Olympic Curling Trials. Team Birt qualified for the Trials Direct-Entry Event due to their CTRS ranking from the 2019–20 season. The team went 1–3 through the round-robin, finishing in last place and not advancing directly to the Trials. Team Birt had one final chance to advance to the Olympic Trials through the 2021 Canadian Olympic Curling Pre-Trials where they finished the round-robin with a 4–2 record. This qualified them for the double knockout round, where they lost both of their games and were eliminated. The team had two more tour stops during the season, which included winning the Stu Sells 1824 Halifax Classic and reaching the semifinal of the Tim Hortons Spitfire Arms Cash Spiel. The 2022 Prince Edward Island Scotties Tournament of Hearts was cancelled due to the pandemic and Team Birt were selected to represent their province at the national women's championship. The team finished the 2022 Scotties Tournament of Hearts with a 4–4 record, fifth place in their pool.

In advance of the 2022–23 season, Team Birt won a fan vote which qualified them for the 2022 PointsBet Invitational. They lost their opening round game to the Rachel Homan rink. On tour, the team won two events. In October, they won the Superstore Monctonian Challenge with spares Colleen Jones and Sinead Dolan filling in for Marie Christianson and Michelle Shea. They then won the Jim Sullivan Curling Classic in November, going undefeated in the event. They also had a semifinal appearance at the New Scotland Clothing Women's Cashspiel. During the season, Christianson took over skipping duties on the team with Birt continuing to throw fourth stones. In the new year, they easily won the 2023 Prince Edward Island Scotties Tournament of Hearts, winning all three qualifying events. At the 2023 Scotties Tournament of Hearts in Kamloops, the team struggled, finishing seventh in their pool with a 2–6 record. After the season, the team announced they would be disbanding, with Birt stating she was taking some time away from curling.

== Personal life ==
Suzanne married Trevor Birt in June 2008, becoming Suzanne Birt. They have two children. She works as a civil servant for the Government of Prince Edward Island.

== Grand Slam record ==
Key
C	Champion
F	Lost in Final
SF	Lost in Semifinal
QF	Lost in Quarterfinals
R16	Lost in the round of 16
Q	Did not advance to playoffs
T2	Played in Tier 2 event
DNP	Did not participate in event
N/A	Not a Grand Slam event that season

Event	2012–13	2013–14	2014–15	2015–16	2016–17	2017–18	2018–19	2019–20
Masters	T2	DNP	DNP	DNP	DNP	DNP	DNP	DNP
Tour Challenge	N/A	N/A	N/A	T2	DNP	DNP	DNP	T2

=== Former events ===
Event	2007–08	2008–09	2009–10	2010–11
Sobeys Slam	QF	Q	N/A	Q
Manitoba Lotteries	Q	DNP	DNP	DNP
